= Spikers' Turf Most Valuable Player award =

Spikers' Turf award

The Spikers' Turf Most Valuable Player award is a Spikers' Turf award given to the best performing player of the conference. The award has been given since the league's first conference in 2015. Since 2025, the Premier Volleyball League (PVL) Press Corps have given out an annual version of the award.

Unlike most other MVP awards, the league award is based on performance in a single conference rather than a full season, similar to the Philippine Basketball Association's Best Player of the Conference award. The PVL Press Corps award given during its PVL Press Corps Awards Night is based on performance throughout multiple conferences in a year, though not necessarily within a single season.

Marck Espejo and Jude Garcia are tied for the most MVP awards with five combined each across Spikers' Turf and the former PVL men's division. The only other player with multiple MVPs is Ranran Abdilla with 2.

== Key ==
^	Denotes player who is still active in Spikers' Turf
†	Denotes player whose team won the conference championship
Player (#)	Denotes the number of times the player has been named MVP
Team (#)	Denotes the number of times a player from this team has won

== PVL Press Corps ==
=== Winners ===
Year	Player	Nat.	Team	Ref.
2025	Jude Garcia^	(Philippines)	Criss Cross King Crunchers	

== Conference Most Valuable Player ==
=== Winners ===
Season	Conference	Player	Nat.	Team	Ref.
2015	Open	Marck Espejo	(Philippines)	Cagayan Valley Rising Suns	
2015	Collegiate †	Marck Espejo (2)	(Philippines)	Ateneo Blue Eagles	
2015	Reinforced	Mark Gil Alfafara	(Philippines)	PLDT Home Fibr Hitters	
2016	Open	Gregorio Dolor^	(Philippines)	IEM Phoenix Volley Masters	
2016	Collegiate †	Marck Espejo (3)	(Philippines)	Ateneo Blue Eagles (2)	
2016	Reinforced †	Howard Mojica	(Philippines)	Philippine Air Force Air Spikers	
2017	Reinforced	Ranran Abdilla	(Philippines)	Philippine Air Force Air Spikers (2)	
2017	Open †	Lorenzo Capate Jr.	(Philippines)	Cignal HD Spikers	
2017	Collegiate †	Marck Espejo (4)	(Philippines)	Ateneo Blue Eagles (3)	
2018	Reinforced	Marck Espejo (5)	(Philippines)	Cignal HD Spikers (2)	
2018	Collegiate	Paolo Pablico	(Philippines)	Adamson Soaring Falcons	
2018	Open †	Bryan Bagunas	(Philippines)	Philippine Air Force Air Spikers (3)	
2019	Reinforced	Ranran Abdilla (2)	(Philippines)	Philippine Air Force Air Spikers (4)	
2019	Open †	Ysay Marasigan^	(Philippines)	Cignal HD Spikers (3)	
2022	Open †	Nico Almendras^	(Philippines)	NU–Sta. Elena Nationals	
2023	Open	Joshua Umandal^	(Philippines)	AMC Cotabato Spikers	
2023	Invitational	Vince Himzon^	(Philippines)	Saints and Lattes–Letran Saints Spikers	
2024–25	2024 Open	Jude Garcia^	(Philippines)	Criss Cross King Crunchers	
2024–25	Invitational	Jude Garcia^ (2)	(Philippines)	Criss Cross King Crunchers (2)	
2024–25	2025 Open	Jude Garcia^ (3)	(Philippines)	Criss Cross King Crunchers (3)	
2025–26	Invitational †	Jude Garcia^ (4)	(Philippines)	Criss Cross King Crunchers (4)	
2025–26	Open †	Jude Garcia^ (5)	(Philippines)	Criss Cross King Crunchers (5)	

=== Multi-time winners ===
Awards	Player	Team(s)	Conferences
5	(Philippines) Marck Espejo	Cagayan Valley Rising Suns, Ateneo Blue Eagles, Cignal HD Spikers	2015 Open, 2015 Collegiate, 2016 Collegiate, 2017 Collegiate, 2018 Reinforced
5	(Philippines) Jude Garcia	Criss Cross King Crunchers	2024 Open, 2024 Invitational, 2025 Open, 2025 Invitational, 2026 Open
2	(Philippines) Ranran Abdilla	Philippine Air Force Air Spikers	2017 Reinforced, 2019 Reinforced

=== Teams ===
Awards	Team	Conferences
5	Criss Cross King Crunchers	2024 Open, 2024 Invitational, 2025 Open, 2025 Invitational, 2026 Open
4	Philippine Air Force Air Spikers	2016 Reinforced, 2017 Reinforced, 2018 Open, 2019 Reinforced
3	Cignal HD Spikers	2017 Open, 2018 Reinforced, 2019 Open
2	Ateneo Blue Eagles	2015 Collegiate, 2016 Collegiate, 2017 Collegiate
