= 2017 Premier Volleyball League All-Star Game =

Tournament information
- Sport: Volleyball
- Location: San Juan
- Date: October 29, 2017
- Administrator: Sports Vision
- Tournament format: All-star game
- Venue: Filoil Flying V Centre
- Participants: Premier Volleyball League players (women's and men's divisions)

The 2017 Premier Volleyball League All-Star Game was the second edition of the all-star exhibition event organized by Sports Vision. The event was held on October 29, 2017, at Filoil Flying V Centre in San Juan. The matches featured select players of the women's and men's divisions of the Premier Volleyball League.

The Women's Division is split into two teams, with BaliPure Water Defenders head coach Roger Gorayeb taking the coaching duties for Red Team while Rico De Guzman of Pocari Sweat Lady Warriors will serve as White Team's coach. On the men's side, the players are split between Coach Oliver Almadro's Blue Team and Vhyl Verayo's Yellow Team. Post-season special event set to raise funds for the benefit of Help Educate and Rear Orphans (HERO) Foundation.

Grethcel Soltones was part of the All-Star Game despite playing for the Foton Tornadoes and Iriga City Oragons, both part of the rival Philippine Super Liga, that year. Since she violated the PSL's one-league rule, she was handed a one-year suspension from the PSL and a ₱50,000 fine.

== Rosters ==
=== Women's division ===
Red Team
Player	Team	Pos.
Amy Ahomiro	BanKo Perlas Spikers	MB
Kathy Bersola	BanKo Perlas Spikers	MB
Tots Carlos	UP Lady Maroons	OP
Alyssa Eroa	BaliPure Purest Water Defenders	L
Jem Ferrer	BanKo Perlas Spikers	S
Jerrili Malabanan	BaliPure Purest Water Defenders	
Jasmine Nabor	BaliPure Purest Water Defenders; NU Lady Bulldogs	S
Cesca Racraquin	Creamline Cool Smashers; San Beda Lady Red Spikers	OH
Risa Sato	BaliPure Purest Water Defenders; NU Lady Bulldogs	MB
Grethcel Soltones	BaliPure Purest Water Defenders; FEU Lady Tamaraws	OH/L
Aiko Urdas	BaliPure Purest Water Defenders; NU Lady Bulldogs	

White Team
Player	Team	Pos.
Bea de Leon	Ateneo Lady Eagles	MB
Melissa Gohing	Pocari Sweat Lady Warriors	L
Isa Molde	UP Lady Maroons	OH
Jia Morado	Creamline Cool Smashers	S
Myla Pablo	Pocari Sweat Lady Warriors	OH
Dell Palomata	Philippine Air Force Jet Spikers	MB
Jeanette Panaga	Pocari Sweat Lady Warriors	MB
Sue Roces	BanKo Perlas Spikers	OH
Pau Soriano	Creamline Cool Smashers	MB
Gyzelle Sy	Pocari Sweat Lady Warriors	S
Nicole Tiamzon	BanKo Perlas Spikers	OH

=== Men's division ===
Yellow Team
Player	Team	Pos.
Edwin Tolentino	Philippine Air Force Air Spikers	OH
Fauzi Ismail	Megabuilders Volley Bolts; NU Bulldogs	OH/OP
Ranran Abdilla	Philippine Air Force Air Spikers	OH
Benjaylo Labide	Philippine Army Troopers	
Kim Malabunga	Megabuilders Volley Bolts; NU Bulldogs	MB
Francis Saura	Megabuilders Volley Bolts; NU Bulldogs	MB/OP
Vince Mangulabnan	Cignal HD Spikers	S
Nico Ramirez	Sta. Elena Wrecking Balls	
Jan Berlin Paglinawan	Sta. Elena Wrecking Balls	OH/OP
Rudolfo Labrador	Philippine Air Force Air Spikers	
Sandy Montero	Cignal HD Spikers	

Blue Team
Player	Team	Pos.
Mark Alfafara	Cignal HD Spikers	OH/OP
Lorenzo Capate Jr.	Cignal HD Spikers	
Marck Espejo	Ateneo Blue Eagles	OH
Rex Intal	Cignal HD Spikers	MB
Ysay Marasigan	Cignal HD Spikers	OP
Rence Melgar	IEM Volley Masters	
James Natividad	NU Bulldogs	
Ish Polvorosa	Ateneo Blue Eagles	S
Jayvee Sumagaysay	Philippine Army Troopers; UST Golden Spikers	MB
Timothy Tajanlangit	Philippine Army Troopers; UST Golden Spikers	
Peter Torres	Cignal HD Spikers	MB

== Match results ==
- All times are in Philippines Standard Time (UTC+08:00)

Date	Time	Teams	Set	1	2	3	4	5	Total	Report
Oct 29	17:00	Blue Team	2	16	25	22	25	9	97	P–2
Oct 29	17:00	Yellow Team	3	25	20	25	23	15	108	P–2
Oct 29	20:00	Red Team	3	25	25	13	25	–	88	P–2
Oct 29	20:00	White Team	1	21	22	25	21	–	89	P–2
