= Spikers' Turf Finals Most Valuable Player award =

Spikers' Turf award

The Spikers' Turf Finals Most Valuable Player award is a Spikers' Turf award given to the best performing player of each conference's finals series. The award has been given since the league's first conference in 2015.

Marck Espejo won the most Finals MVPs with five followed closely by Bryan Bagunas with 4. Lorenzo Capate Jr. is the only other player with multiple awards with two.

== Winners ==
^	Denotes player who is still active in Spikers' Turf
Player (#)	Denotes the number of times the player has been named Finals MVP
Team (#)	Denotes the number of times a player from this team has won

Season	Conference	Player	Nat.	Team	Ref.
2015	Open	Mark Gil Alfafara	(Philippines)	PLDT Home Fibr Hitters	
2015	Collegiate	Marck Espejo	(Philippines)	Ateneo Blue Eagles	
2015	Reinforced	Edward Ybañez	(Philippines)	Cignal HD Spikers	
2016	Open	Fauzi Ismail	(Philippines)	Philippine Air Force Air Spikers	
2016	Collegiate	Antony Paul Koyfman	(United States)	Ateneo Blue Eagles (2)	
2016	Reinforced	Bryan Bagunas	(Philippines)	Philippine Air Force Air Spikers (2)	
2017	Reinforced	Lorenzo Capate Jr.	(Philippines)	Cignal HD Spikers (2)	
2017	Open	Lorenzo Capate Jr. (2)	(Philippines)	Cignal HD Spikers (3)	
2017	Collegiate	Marck Espejo (2)	(Philippines)	Ateneo Blue Eagles (3)	
2018	Reinforced	Bryan Bagunas (2)	(Philippines)	Philippine Air Force Air Spikers (3)	
2018	Collegiate	Bryan Bagunas (3)	(Philippines)	NU Bulldogs	
2018	Open	Ranran Abdilla	(Philippines)	Philippine Air Force Air Spikers (4)	
2019	Reinforced	Marck Espejo (3)	(Philippines)	Cignal HD Spikers (4)	
2019	Open	Marck Espejo (4)	(Philippines)	Cignal HD Spikers (5)	
2022	Open	Michaelo Buddin	(Philippines)	NU–Sta. Elena Nationals (2)	
2023	Open	Marck Espejo (5)	(Philippines)	Cignal HD Spikers (6)	
2023	Invitational	Jade Alex Disquitado	(Philippines)	Sta. Elena–NU Nationals (3)	
2024–25	2024 Open	Bryan Bagunas (4)	(Philippines)	Cignal HD Spikers (7)	
2024–25	Invitational	Louie Ramirez^	(Philippines)	Cignal HD Spikers (8)	
2024–25	2025 Open	Steve Rotter	(United States) (Philippines)	Cignal HD Spikers (9)	
2025–26	Invitational	Adrian Villados^	(Philippines)	Criss Cross King Crunchers	
2025–26	Open	Jude Garcia^	(Philippines)	Criss Cross King Crunchers (2)	

== Multi-time winners ==
Awards	Player	Team(s)	Conferences
5	(Philippines) Marck Espejo	Ateneo Blue Eagles, Cignal HD Spikers	2015 Collegiate, 2017 Collegiate, 2019 Reinforced, 2019 Open, 2023 Open
4	(Philippines) Bryan Bagunas	Philippine Air Force Air Spikers, Cignal HD Spikers	2016 Reinforced, 2018 Reinforced, 2018 Collegiate, 2024 Open
2	(Philippines) Lorenzo Capate Jr.	Cignal HD Spikers	2017 Reinforced, 2017 Open

== Teams ==
Awards	Team	Conferences
9	Cignal HD Spikers	2015 Reinforced, 2017 Reinforced, 2017 Open, 2019 Reinforced, 2019 Open, 2023 Open, 2024 Open, 2024 Invitational, 2025 Open
4	Philippine Air Force Air Spikers	2016 Open, 2016 Reinforced, 2018 Reinforced, 2018 Open
3	Ateneo Blue Eagles	2015 Collegiate, 2016 Collegiate, 2017 Collegiate
3	NU Bulldogs	2018 Collegiate, 2022 Open, 2023 Invitational
2	Criss Cross King Crunchers	2025 Invitational, 2026 Open
