= Rodolfo Labrador =

Filipino volleyball player (born 1992)

Rodolfo Labrador Jr.

Personal information
- Nationality: Filipino
- Height: 1.92 m (6 ft 4 in)
- Weight: March 17, 1992 (age 34)
- Education: Far Eastern University

Volleyball information
- Position: Middle Blocker
- Current club: Philippine Air Force Air Spikers
- Number: 7

Career
Years	Teams
2014–2023	Philippine Air Force Air Spikers

Rodolfo Labrador Jr. (born March 17, 1992) is a Filipino volleyball player. He last played for the Philippine Air Force Air Spikers in the Spikers' Turf.

== Career ==
=== Collegiate ===
Labrador made his first game appearance with the FEU Tamaraws in the UAAP Season 70. They got a 13–2 win-loss record in the preliminary round tied UST Tiger Spikers. They succeeded to advance in the finals after defeating the UP Fighting Maroons in the Semis but they failed to get the championship title after being defeated by UST Golden Spikers in the finals.

In UAAP Season 71, they failed to advanced in the Semis after being placed in 6th.

In UAAP Season 72, they got a 11–3 win-loss record in the preliminary round. They succeeded to advanced in the finals after defeating the Ateneo Blue Eagles in the Semis but they failed to get the championship title after being defeated by UST Golden Spikers in the finals.

In UAAP Season 73, they got a 13–1 win-loss record in the preliminary round tied with UST Golden Spikers. They succeeded to advanced in the finals after defeating the UP Fighting Maroons in the Semis but they failed to get the championship title after being defeated by UST Golden Spikers in the Game 2 of best-of-three finals series.

In UAAP Season 74, it was the last playing year of Labrador in the UAAP. They got 12–2 win-loss record in the preliminary round. They won against De La Salle Green Archers in the Semis. They hailed as UAAP Season 74 champions after they won against UST Golden Spikers in the Game 2 of best-of-three finals series.

== Clubs ==
- (Philippines) Philippine Air Force Air Spikers (2014–2023)

== Awards ==
=== Collegiate ===
Year	League	Season	Title	Ref
2008	UAAP	70	Runner-up	
2010	UAAP	72	Runner-up	
2011	UAAP	73	Runner-up	
2012	UAAP	74	Champions	

=== Clubs ===
Year	League	Season/Conference	Club	Title	Ref
2014	PSL	All-Filipino	PLDT Home TVolution Power Attackers	Champion	
2014	PSL	Grand Prix	PLDT Home TVolution Power Attackers	Runner-up	
2015	Spikers' Turf	Reinforced	Philippine Air Force Air Spikers	Runner-up	
2016	Spikers' Turf	Open	Philippine Air Force Air Spikers	Champions	
2016	Spikers' Turf	Reinforced	Philippine Air Force Air Spikers	Champions	
2017	PVL	Reinforced	Philippine Air Force Air Spikers	Runner-up	
2017	PVL	Open	Philippine Air Force Air Spikers	3rd place	
2018	PVL	Reinforced	Philippine Air Force Air Spikers	Champions	
2018	Spikers' Turf	Open	Philippine Air Force Air Spikers	Champions	
2019	Spikers' Turf	Reinforced	Philippine Air Force Air Spikers	Runner-up	
2019	Spikers' Turf	Open	Philippine Air Force Air Spikers	Runner-up	
2021	PNVF	Champions League	Philippine Air Force Air Spikers	Runner-up	
