= Peter Torres =

Filipino volleyball player (born 1993)

Personal information
- Full name: Peter Den Mar Torres
- Nationality: Filipino
- Born: December 7, 1993 (age 32)
- Height: 1.91 m (6 ft 3 in)
- Education: National University

Volleyball information
- Position: Middle Blocker
- Current club: Cignal HD Spikers
- Number: 4

Career
Years	Teams
2015	Cagayan Valley Rising Suns
2016–2024	Cignal HD Spikers

Peter Den Mar Torres (born December 7, 1993) is a Filipino volleyball player. He played with NU Bulldogs collegiate men's University team. He played for the Cignal HD Spikers in the Spikers' Turf.

== Career ==
=== Collegiate ===
Torres made his first game appearance with the NU Bulldogs in the UAAP Season 73 where they placed in 7th.

In UAAP Season 75, they won the first championship of NU Bulldogs in the UAAP volleyball after defeating FEU Tamaraws in the finals.

In UAAP Season 76, they won the second and back-to-back championship of NU Bulldogs in the UAAP volleyball after defeating Ateneo Blue Eagles in the finals.

In UAAP Season 77, it was the last playing year of Torres. They failed to defend their third championship title after being defeated by Ateneo Blue Eagles in the Finals.

== Clubs ==
- (Philippines) Cagayan Valley Rising Suns (2015)
- (Philippines) Cignal HD Spikers (2016–2024)

== Awards ==
=== Individual ===
Year	League	Season/Conference	Award	Ref
2011	UAAP	73	Rookie of the Year	
2012	UAAP	74	Best Attacker	
2013	UAAP	75	MVP (Finals)	
2013	UAAP	75	Best Attacker	
2014	UAAP	77	Best Blocker	
2015 Spikers' Turf	Spikers' Turf	Open	2nd Best Middle Blocker	
2015 Spikers' Turf	Spikers' Turf	Reinforced	1st Best Middle Blocker	
2016	Spikers' Turf	Reinforced	2nd Best Middle Blocker	
2018	Spikers' Turf	Open	1st Best Middle Blocker	

=== Collegiate ===
==== NU Bulldogs ====
Year	League	Season/Conference	Title	Ref
2013	UAAP	75	Champions	
2014	UAAP	76	Champions	

=== Clubs ===
Year	League	Season/Conference	Club	Title	Ref
2015	Spikers' Turf	Reinforced	PLDT Home Ultera Ultra Fast Hitters	3rd place	
2016	Spikers' Turf	Open	Cignal HD Spikers	Runner-up	
2016	Spikers' Turf	Reinforced	Cignal HD Spikers	Runner-up	
2017	PVL	Reinforced	Cignal HD Spikers	Champions	
2017	PVL	Open	Cignal HD Spikers	Champions	
2018	PVL	Reinforced	Cignal HD Spikers	Runner-up	
2018	Spikers' Turf	Open	Cignal HD Spikers	3rd place	
2019	Spikers' Turf	Reinforced	Cignal HD Spikers	Champions	
2019	Spikers' Turf	Open	Cignal HD Spikers	Champions	
2022	Spikers' Turf	Open	Cignal HD Spikers	Runner-up	
2022	PNVF	Champions League	Cignal HD Spikers	Champions	
2023	Spikers' Turf	Open	Cignal HD Spikers	Champions	
2023	Spikers' Turf	Invitational	Cignal HD Spikers	Runner-up	
2023	PNVF	Challenge Cup	Cignal HD Spikers	Runner-up	
