= Edwin Tolentino =

Filipino volleyball player (born 1993)

Personal information
- Nationality: Filipino
- Born: January 29, 1993 (age 33)
- Height: 1.80 m (5 ft 11 in)
- Education: National University

Volleyball information
- Position: Outside Hitter
- Current club: Philippine Air Force Air Spikers
- Number: 18

Edwin Tolentino (born January 29, 1993) is a Filipino beach and indoor volleyball player. He played with NU Bulldogs collegiate men's University team. He last played for the Philippine Air Force Air Spikers in the Spikers' Turf.

== Career ==
=== Collegiate ===
Tolentino made his first game appearance with the NU Bulldogs in the UAAP Season 73 where he placed 7th.

In UAAP Season 74, he failed to advanced in the Semis after being placed in 5th.

In UAAP Season 75, he won the first championship of NU Bulldogs in the UAAP volleyball after defeating FEU Tamaraws in the finals.

In UAAP Season 76, he won the second and back-to-back championship of NU Bulldogs in the UAAP volleyball after defeating Ateneo Blue Eagles in the finals.

The UAAP Season 77 was the last playing year for Tolentino. He failed to defend their third championship title after being defeated by Ateneo Blue Eagles in the Finals.

== Clubs ==
- (Philippines) Philippine Air Force Air Spikers (2016–2024)

== Awards ==
=== Collegiate ===
Year	League	Season/Conference	Title	Ref
2013	UAAP	75	Champions	
2014	UAAP	76	Champions	
2015	UAAP	77	Runner-up	

=== Clubs ===
Year	League	Season/Conference	Club	Title	Ref
2015	Spikers' Turf	Reinforced	Philippine Air Force Air Spikers	Runner-up	
2016	Spikers' Turf	Open	Philippine Air Force Air Spikers	Champions	
2016	Spikers' Turf	Reinforced	Philippine Air Force Air Spikers	Champions	
2017	PVL	Reinforced	Philippine Air Force Air Spikers	Runner-up	
2017	PVL	Open	Philippine Air Force Air Spikers	3rd place	
2018	PVL	Reinforced	Philippine Air Force Air Spikers	Champions	
2018	Spikers' Turf	Open	Philippine Air Force Air Spikers	Champions	
2019	Spikers' Turf	Reinforced	Philippine Air Force Air Spikers	Runner-up	
2019	Spikers' Turf	Open	Philippine Air Force Air Spikers	Runner-up	
2021	PNVF	Champions League	Philippine Air Force Air Spikers	Runner-up	
