= Mark Gil Alfafara =

Filipino volleyball player (born 1994)

Personal information
- Nationality: Filipino
- Born: January 28, 1994 (age 32)
- Height: 1.83 m (6 ft 0 in)
- Education: University of Santo Tomas

Volleyball information
- Position: Outside Hitter; Opposite Hitter

Career
Years	Teams
2015	PLDT
2016	Philippine Air Force Air Spikers
2017	Cignal HD Spikers
2018–2019	Rebisco
2021	PLDT

National team
2019	Philippines
Honours
Men's indoor volleyball
Representing Philippines
Southeast Asian Games
Silver medal – second place	2019 Manila	Indoor

Mark Gil Alfafara (born January 28, 1994) is a Filipino former volleyball player. He played with UST Growling Tigers collegiate men's University team.

== Career ==
=== Collegiate ===
In UAAP Season 73, they got a 13–1 win-loss record in the preliminary round tied with FEU Tamaraws. They succeeded to advanced in the finals after defeating the La Salle Green Archers in the Semis. They won the championship title after beating the FEU Tamaraws in Game 2 of the best-of-three finals series.

In UAAP Season 74, they got 11–3 win-loss record in the preliminary round. They won against Adamson Soaring Falcons in the Semis but failed to get the championship title after being defeated by FEU Tamaraws in Game 2 of the best-of-three finals series.

In UAAP Season 75, they failed to advance to the Semis after being placed 5th. Alfafara and Red Christensen of De La Salle Green Archers shared the Season's MVP on that year.

In UAAP Season 76, they were placed 6th.

In UAAP Season 77, it was the last playing year of Mark Gil Alfafara in the UAAP. They got an 11–3 win-loss record in the preliminary round, tied with Ateneo Blue Eagles. They failed to advance in the finals after being defeated by NU Bulldogs in Game 2 of the semis.

=== Club ===
Alfafara has played in the Premier Volleyball League. He joined the Cignal Cignal HD Spikers in the 2017 Reinforced Conference.

== Clubs ==
- (Philippines) PLDT (2015, 2018–2019)
- (Philippines) Philippine Air Force Air Spikers (2016)
- (Philippines) Cignal HD Spikers (2017)
- (Philippines) Rebisco (2021)

== Awards ==
=== Individual ===
Year	League	Season/conference	Award	Ref
2013	UAAP	75	MVP (Season)	
2013	UAAP	75	Best Blocker	
2014	UAAP	76	Best Scorer	
2014	UAAP	76	Best Attacker	
2015	UAAP	77	Best Scorer	
2015	Spikers' Turf	Open	MVP (Finals)	
2015	Spikers' Turf	Open	Best Opposite Spiker	
2015	Spikers' Turf	Reinforced	MVP (Season)	
2015	Spikers' Turf	Reinforced	1st Best Outside Spiker	
2017	PVL	Reinforced	1st Best Outside Spiker	

=== Collegiate ===
Year	League	Season/conference	Title	Ref
2011	UAAP	73	Champions	
2012	UAAP	74	Runner-up	
2015	UAAP	77	3rd place	

=== Clubs ===
Year	League	Season/conference	Club	Title	Ref
2015	Spikers' Turf	Open	PLDT Home Ultra Fast Hitters	Champion	
2015	Spikers' Turf	Reinforced	PLDT Home Ultra Fast Hitters	3rd place	
2016	Spikers' Turf	Open	Philippine Air Force Air Spikers	Champions	
2016	Spikers' Turf	Reinforced	Philippine Air Force Air Spikers	Champions	
2017	PVL	Reinforced	Cignal HD Spikers	Champions	
2017	PVL	Open	Cignal HD Spikers	Champions	
2018	Spikers' Turf	Open	PLDT Home Ultra Fast Hitters	Runner-up	
2019	Spikers' Turf	Reinforced	PLDT Home Ultra Fast Hitters	3rd place	
