= Ysay Marasigan =

Filipino volleyball player (born 1994)

Ysrael Marasigan
Personal information
- Full name: Ysrael Wilson Marasigan
- Nickname: Ysay
- Nationality: Filipino
- Born: September 24, 1994 (age 32)
- Education: Ateneo De Manila University
- Height: 6 ft 0 in (1.83 m)

Volleyball information
- Position: Opposite hitter
- Current club: Criss Cross King Crunchers
- Number: 8

Ysrael Wilson Marasigan (born September 24, 1994) is a Filipino indoor and beach volleyball player. He played with Ateneo Blue Eagles collegiate men's volleyball team. He is currently playing for the Criss Cross King Crunchers in the Spikers' Turf.

== Career ==
=== Collegiate ===
==== Indoor ====
Marasigan made his first game appearance with the Ateneo Blue Eagles in the UAAP in UAAP Season 74, where they finished in 7th. In the following year, the Ateneo Blue Eagles were placed in 6th.

In UAAP Season 76, his team got an 11–3 win–loss record in the elimination round of UAAP Season 76 men's volleyball tournament. Ateneo Blue Eagles won over FEU Tamaraws in semi-finals and loss to NU Bulldogs in Finals.

In UAAP Season 77, his team repeated its 11–3 win-loss record last year in the elimination round of the UAAP Season 77 men's volleyball tournament. The Ateneo Blue Eagles won over the Adamson Soaring Falcons in the semi-finals, and the Ateneo Blue Eagles won their first championship title in the UAAP after beating the NU Bulldogs in the game 2 of best of three finals series.

In UAAP Season 78, it was his last playing year in the UAAP. His team got a 13–1 win-loss record in the elimination round of the UAAP Season 78 men's volleyball tournament. The Ateneo Blue Eagles won over the UP Fighting Maroons in the semi-finals, and the Ateneo Blue Eagles won their first back-to-back championship title in the UAAP after beating the NU Bulldogs in the Game 2 of best of three series finals.

== Clubs ==
- (Philippines) Cignal HD Spikers – (2016 - 2023)
- (Philippines) Criss Cross King Crunchers – (2024–present)

== Awards ==
=== Individual ===
Year	League	Season/Conference	Award	Ref
2012	UAAP	74 (Beach)	Rookie of the Year	
2015	Spikers' Turf	Collegiate	Best Opposite Spiker	
2016	UAAP	78 (Indoor)	MVP (Finals)	
2016	UAAP	78 (Beach)	MVP	
2018	Spikers' Turf	Open	Best Opposite Spiker	
2019	Spikers' Turf	Open	Best Opposite Spiker	
2019	Spikers' Turf	Open	Conference MVP	
2022	Spikers' Turf	Open	Best Opposite Spiker	
2023	Spikers' Turf	Open	Best Opposite Spiker	

=== Collegiate ===
Year	League	Season/Conference	Title	Ref
2015	Spikers' Turf	Collegiate	Champions	
2016	UAAP	77	Champions	
2017	UAAP	78	Champions	

=== Clubs ===
Year	League	Season/Conference	Club	Title	Ref
2016	Spikers' Turf	Open	Cignal HD Spikers	Runner-up	
2016	Spikers' Turf	Reinforced	Cignal HD Spikers	Runner-up	
2017	PVL	Reinforced	Cignal HD Spikers	Champions	
2017	PVL	Open	Cignal HD Spikers	Champions	
2018	PVL	Reinforced	Cignal HD Spikers	Runner-up	
2018	Spikers' Turf	Open	Cignal HD Spikers	3rd place	
2019	Spikers' Turf	Reinforced	Cignal HD Spikers	Champions	
2019	Spikers' Turf	Open	Cignal HD Spikers	Champions	
2022	Spikers' Turf	Open	Cignal HD Spikers	Runner-up	
2022	PNVF	Champions League	Cignal HD Spikers	Champions	
2023	Spikers' Turf	Open	Cignal HD Spikers	Champions	
2023	Spikers' Turf	Invitational	Cignal HD Spikers	Runner-up	
2023	PNVF	Challenge Cup	Cignal HD Spikers	Runner-up	
2024	Spikers' Turf	Open	Criss Cross King Crunchers	Runner-up	
2024	Spikers' Turf	Invitational	Criss Cross King Crunchers	Runner-up	
2025	Spikers' Turf	Open	Criss Cross King Crunchers	Runner-up	
