= Philippine Navy Sea Lions =

Men's volleyball club team

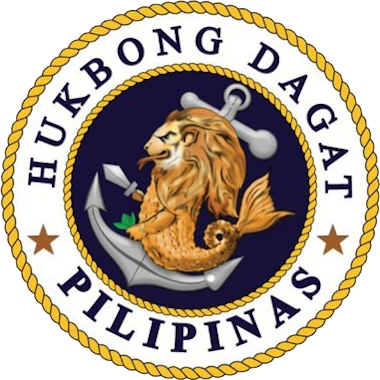
- Short name: Philippine Navy
- Nickname: Sea Lions
- Founded: 2015
- Head coach: George Pascua
- Captain: Gregorio Dolor
- League: Spikers' Turf
- 2025 Invitational: 10th place

Uniforms
Home	Away

The Philippine Navy Sea Lions represents the Philippine Navy in men's volleyball competitions. The team currently competes in Spikers' Turf and is composed of enlisted personnel and reinforced with civilian players.

== Current roster ==
PGJC-Navy Sealions
Number	Player	Position	School
1	Mark Kenneth Paulino	Opposite Spiker	
3	Reynald David Honra	Outside Hitter	
4	John Ashley Jacob	Outside Hitter	
5	Bonjomar Castel	Middle Blocker	
6	Melver Lapurga	Outside Hitter	
7	Anfernee Curamen	Middle Blocker	
8	Abdul Hafiz Bangcola	Setter	
9	Louie Pudadera	Setter	
10	Jeremy Santos	Libero	
11	Omar Lioc	Outside Hitter	
12	Dearborn Saria	Setter	
13	Jack Kalingking	Libero	UPHSD
14	Marvin Hairami	Setter	
15	Peter Quiel	Middle Blocker	FEU
16	Gregorio Dolor (C)	Outside Hitter	FEU
17	Jhon Robert Raquiza	Outside Hitter	
18	Joeven Dela Vega	Opposite Hitter	
19	Jeric Caranguian	Outside Hitter	
22	Jaivee Malabanan	Outside Hitter	
25	Adiel Rosete	Outside Hitter	

- Head coach: George Pascua
- Assistant coach: Cecille Cruzada

== Honors ==
=== Team ===
Spikers' Turf/Premier Volleyball League:

Season	Conference	Title	Ref.
2015	Open	did not compete	
2015	Reinforced	4th place	
2016	Open	6th place	
2016	Reinforced	did not compete	
2017	Reinforced	did not compete	
2017	Open	did not compete	
2018	Reinforced	did not compete	
2018	Open	6th place	
2019	Reinforced	6th place	
2019	Open	5th place	
2022	Open	3rd place	
2023	Open	6th place	
2023	Invitational	8th place	
2024	Open	3rd place	
2024	Invitational	7th place	
2025	Open	6th place	
2025	Invitational	10th place	

PNVF:

Year	Tournament	Title	Source
2021	PNVF Champions League	4th place	
2022	PNVF Champions League	4th place	
2023	PNVF Challenge Cup	5th place	
2024	PNVF Champions League	7th place	

=== Individual ===
Spikers' Turf/Premier Volleyball League:

Season	Conference	Award	Player	Ref.
2015	Reinforced	2nd Best Outside Spiker	Nur Amid Madsairi	
2024	Open	2nd Best Outside Spiker	Greg Dolor	
2024	Open	1st Best Middle Blocker	Peter Quiel	
2024	Open	Best Libero	Jack Kalingking	

PNVF:

Season	Award	Name	Source
2022	Best Opposite Spiker	Joeven Dela Vega	

== Team captains ==
- John Paul Junio (2015)
- Alvin Cacayuran (2016)
- Milover Parcon (2018)
- Relan Taneo (2019)
- Gregorio Dolor (2022, 2023, 2024–present)
- Marvin Hairami (2023)

== Coaches ==
- Rene Gaspillo (2015)
- Edgardo Rusit (2016, 2019)
- Bob Malenab (2018)
- Cecil Cruzad (2022)
- George Pascua (2024–present)

== See also ==
- Philippine Navy – Iriga City Oragons
