= Cagayan Valley Rising Suns (disambiguation) =

Cagayan Valley Rising Suns may refer to one of several teams owned by the family of Alvaro Antonio, governor of the Province of Cagayan:

- Cagayan Valley Rising Suns, men's volleyball team
- Cagayan Valley Lady Rising Suns, women's volleyball team
- Cagayan Rising Suns, men's basketball team
