= Philippine Army Troopers =

- Short name: Army
- Nickname: Troopers
- Head coach: Sgt. Rico de Guzman
- Captain: Benjaylo Labide (FEU)
- League: Spikers' Turf
- 2023 Invitational: 11th place

Uniforms
Home	Away

The Philippine Army Troopers represents the Philippine Army in men's volleyball competitions. The team is composed of enlisted personnel and reinforced with civilian players from time to time.

== Team colors ==
Philippine Army Troopers

== Current roster ==
Philippine Army Troopers
Number	Player	Position
1	Karlle Nico Ramirez	Setter
2	Ferdinand Ulibas Jr.	Outside Hitter
3	Joshua Barrica	Outside Hitter
5	Benjaylo Labide (c)	Outside Hitter
6	Jayson Uy	Libero
8	Ariel Kenneth Baloaloa	Middle Blocker
9	Kevin Liberato	Middle Blocker
10	John Kenneth Bayking	Libero
11	Edward Oxciano	Outside Hitter
14	Manuel Andrie Medina	Outside Hitter
14	Jaidal Abdulmajid	Opposite Spiker
15	Nikki Depamaylo	Setter
16	Joel Villonson	Middle Blocker
18	Mark Christian Enciso	Outside Hitter

- Head coach: Melvin Carolino
- Assistant coach: Randy Fallorina

== Honors ==
=== Team ===
Spikers' Turf/Premier Volleyball League:

Season	Conference	Title	Source
2015	Open	5th place	
2015	Reinforced	did not compete -	
2016	Open	did not compete -	
2016	Reinforced	5th place	
2017 (Note: with the Premier Volleyball League)	Reinforced	3rd place	
2017	Open	5th place	
2018	Reinforced	5th place	
2018	Open	8th place	
2019	Reinforced	5th place	
2019	Open	17th place	
2022	Open	7th place	
2023	Open	8th place	
2023	Invitational	11th place	

Philippine Superliga:

Season	Conference	Title	Source
2019	Beach Challenge Cup	3rd place	

=== Individual ===
Season	Conference	Award	Name	Source
2017	Reinforced	1st Best Middle Blocker	Jayvee Sumagaysay	

== Team captains ==
- John Ian Depamaylo (2015)
- Benjaylo Labide (2016 - 2018)
- Patrick John Rojas (2019)
- Randy Fallorina (2019)
- Benjaylo Labide (2022 - present)

== See also ==
- Philippine Army Lady Troopers
