= Fauzi Ismail =

Filipino volleyball player (born 1995)

Personal information
- Full name: Fauzi Kasim Ismail
- Nationality: Filipino
- Born: September 3, 1995 (age 31); Tandubas, Tawi-Tawi
- Height: 1.80 m (5 ft 11 in)
- Education: National University

Volleyball information
- Position: Outside Hitter; Opposite Hitter

Fauzi Kasim Ismail (born September 3, 1995) is a Filipino volleyball player. He played with NU Bulldogs collegiate men's University team. He last played for the AMC Cotabato Spikers in the Spikers' Turf.

== Career ==
=== Collegiate ===
Ismail play for the Bulldogs of the National University in the University Athletic Association of the Philippines (UAAP).

He ended his stint with NU last playing for them in Season 80, where they won the championship title.

== Clubs ==
- (Philippines) Philippine Air Force Air Spikers (2016, 2018 Reinforced)
- (Philippines) Megabuilders Volley Bolts (2017)
- (Philippines) Cignal HD Spikers (2018 Open)
- (Philippines) AMC Cotabato Spikers (2022–2023)

== Awards ==
=== Individual ===
Year	League	Season/Conference	Award	Ref
2016	Spikers' Turf	Open	MVP (Finals)	
2016	Spikers' Turf	Open	2nd Best Outside Hitter	
2017	PVL	Reinforced	2nd Best Outside Hitter	
2017	PVL	Collegiate	2nd Best Outside Hitter	
2018	PVL	Reinforced	2nd Best Outside Hitter	

=== Collegiate ===
Year	Tournament	Title	Ref
2013	75	Champions	
2014	76	Champions	
2015	77	Runner-up	
2015 Spikers' Turf	Collegiate	Runner-up	
2016 Spikers' Turf	Collegiate	Runner-up	
2016	78	Runner-up	
2017	79	Runner-up	
2018	80	Champions	

=== Clubs ===
Year	League	Season/Conference	Club	Title	Ref
2017	PVL	Open	Megabuilders Volley Bolts	Runner-up	
2018	PVL	Reinforced	Philippine Air Force Air Spikers	Champions	
2018	PVL	Open	Cignal HD Spikers	3rd place	
2022	PNVF	Champions League	AMC Cotabato Spikers	Runner-up	
2023	Spikers' Turf	Open	AMC Cotabato Spikers	Runner-up	
