= 2022 Spikers' Turf Open Conference =

Only Conference of the 2022 SPT season

- Duration: August 30 – October 6, 2022
- Teams: 7
- Attendance: 6,480

Results
- Champions: NU–Sta. Elena Nationals
- Runners-up: Cignal HD Spikers
- Third place: PGJC–Navy Sea Lions
- Fourth place: VNS–One Alicia Griffins

Awards
- Conference MVP: Nico Almendras
- Finals MVP: Buds Buddin
- Best OH: Marck Espejo; John Benedict San Andres
- Best MB: Obed Mukaba; John Paul Bugaoan
- Best OPP: Ysay Marasigan
- Best Setter: Owa Retamar
- Best Libero: Manuel Sumanguid III

Spikers' Turf Open Conference chronology
- < 2019 2023 >

Spikers' Turf conference chronology
- < 2019 Open 2023 Open >

The 2022 Spikers' Turf Open Conference was the only conference of the 2022 season of Spikers' Turf. The tournament was held at Paco Arena in Manila from August 30 to October 6, 2022 with a total of seven teams.

The Spikers' Turf returned after a three-year absence, with its last tournament played being the 2019 Open Conference.

NU-Sta. Elena Nationals defeated the reigning champions Cignal HD Spikers in the championship match best-of-three series to clinched their first ever gold of the tournament. Cignal HD Spikers gets their fourth silver. PGJC-Navy Sea Lions defeated VNS-One Alicia Griffins in the third place match best-of-three series and claimed their first bronze.

== Participating teams ==
2022 Spikers' Turf Open Conference
Abbr.	Team	Affiliation	Head coach	Team captain
PAR	Philippine Army-Katinko Troopers	Greenstone Pharmaceutical HK, Inc. / Philippine Army	(Philippines) Melvin Carolino	(Philippines) Benjaylo Labide
ADMU	Ateneo-Fudgee Barr Blue Eagles	Ateneo De Manila University / Republic Biscuit Corporation	(Philippines) Timothy Sto. Tomas	(Philippines) Lance Andrei De Castro
CHD	Cignal HD Spikers	Cignal TV, Inc.	(Philippines) Dexter Clamor	(Philippines) Ysrael Wilson Marasigan
NU	NU-Sta. Elena Bulldogs	National University / Sta. Elena Construction and Development Corporation	(Philippines) Dante Alinsunurin	(Philippines) Ave Joshua Retamar
PJN	PGJC-Navy Sea Lions	Philippine Navy	(Philippines) Cecil Cruzada	(Philippines) Gregorio Dolor
SRC	Santa Rosa City Lions	Department of Education City Division of Sta. Rosa	(Philippines) Edward Jan Lirio	(Philippines) Chris Emmanuel Hernandez
VNS	VNS-One Alicia Griffins	VNS Management Group	(Philippines) Ralph Raymund Ocampo	(Philippines) John Benedict San Andres

== Venue ==
All matches
Manila
Paco Arena
Capacity: 1,000

== Squads ==
The following are the club team members.

Army-Katinko Troopers

2 Awie Abdulla MB
3 Joshua Barrica OH
4 Madzlan Gampong OP
5 Benjaylo Labide (c) OH
6 Jason Uy L
8 Randy Fallorina OP
9 Antonio Torres MB

10 John Kenneth Bayking L
12 Patrick John Rojas OH
13 Kris Cian Silang S
14 Jaidal Abdulmajid OP
15 Nikki Depamaylo S
17 John Daniel Diwa MB
21 Rey Taneo S

Ateneo-Fudgee Barr Blue Eagles

1 Vincent Raphael Mangulabnan S
2 Leinuel Crisostomo OH
3 John Kenneth San Diego OP
4 Jetlee Gopio MB
5 Kennedy Batas OP
6 Lutrelle Andre Taneo OH
7 James Daniel Licauco S
8 Amil Pacinio OH

10 Paulo Lorenzo Trinidad L
11 Canciano Llenos OH
13 Lance Andrei De Castro (c) L
14 Emmanuel Go S
16 Andrei John Almandro OH
17 Jeric Sendon MB
18 Jian Matthew Salarzon OH
22 Charles David Absin MB

Cignal HD Spikers

1 Sandy Domenick Montero L
2 John Paul Bugaoan MB
3 Owen Suarez S
4 Peter Den Mar Torres MB
5 Edmar Bonono OH
6 Alfred Val Buena OP
7 Rex Emmanuel Intal MB
8 Ysrael Wilson Marasigan (c) OP

10 Wendel Miguel OH
11 Edward Camposano OH
12 Chumason Celestine Njigha MB
13 Manuel Sumanguid III L
14 Louie Ramirez OH
15 Marck Espejo OH
17 Geuel Asia S

NU-Sta. Elena Nationals

1 Nico Almendras OH
2 Clarenz Belostrino S
3 Ahmad Fajani Abdul OP
4 Mac Alvin Bandola OH
5 Kyle Adrien Ramones MB
6 Buds Buddin OH
8 Jan Mariano Sumagui L
9 Louis Emmanuel Lumanlan MB

10 Obed Mukaba MB
11 Kennry Malinis OP
13 Ave Joshua Retamar (c) S
15 Marco Ely Maclang L
16 Joseph Phillip Bello S
18 Leo Aringo OH
22 Michael John Fortuna OP
23 Jenngerard Anfranz Diao MB

PGJC-Navy Sea Lions

1 Joshua Umandal OH
2 Alsali Pajiji OH
3 Jack Kalingking L
5 Ej Casaña S
9 Vince Lorenzo L
11 Omar Lioc OP
12 Jemmy Entig MB

13 Ronniel Rosales MB
14 Marvin Hairami S
15 Peter Quiel MB
16 Gregorio Dolor (c) OH
17 Wilbert Sapida MB
18 Joeven Dela Vega OP
20 Christian Marcelino OH

Santa Rosa City Lions

1 Curt Jan Guillermo MB
2 David Quer Talento OH
3 Kris Gabriel Hernandez OP
4 Ike Andrew Barilea MB
5 Jade Disquitado OH
6 Sean Andrei Labrador MB

7 Chris Emmanuel Hernandez (c) OH
8 Mark Jason Baldos S
9 Jhon Mark Espanso L
10 Dave Thomas Lardizabal MB
11 Rhaine Christian Mariano S
17 Jeremi Pierre Cuenca L

VNS-One Alicia Griffins

0 Mike Jhoncell Gonzalvo OP
1 Adrian Imperial S
2 Roniey Adviento MB
3 Jan Frederick Mangulabnan S
4 John Joshua Cruz L
6 Kim Malabunga MB
7 Michael Christian Doria MB
8 Jerremy Pedrosa OH

9 Sean Axel Oliver MB
10 Uriel Mendoza OH
11 Alfredo Pagulong L
12 R-vin Morris Gavan OP
13 John Benedict San Andres (c) OH
14 Esmilzo Polvorosa S
15 Jeremy Merat OP
16 Kevin Montemayor OP

== Format ==
Preliminary round

- The preliminary round was a single round-robin tournament, with each team playing one match against all other teams for a total of six matches.
- The top four teams advanced to the semifinals while the bottom three were eliminated.

Semifinals

- The semifinals was also a single round-robin, with each team playing a total of three matches during this round.
- The top two teams advanced to the championship while the bottom two would play in the third-place series.

Finals

- The championship and third-place series were best-of-three series.
- The match-ups were as follows:
  - Championship: SF#1 vs. SF#2
  - Third-place series: SF#3 vs. SF#4

== Pool standing procedure ==
- First, teams are ranked by the number of matches won.
- If the number of matches won is tied, the tied teams are then ranked by match points, wherein:
  - Match won 3–0 or 3–1: 3 match points for the winner, 0 match points for the loser.
  - Match won 3–2: 2 match points for the winner, 1 match point for the loser.
- In case of any further ties, the following criteria shall be used:
  - Set ratio: the number of sets won divided by number of sets lost.
  - Point ratio: number of points scored divided by number of points allowed.
  - Head-to-head standings: any remaining tied teams are ranked based on the results of head-to-head matches involving the teams in question.

== Preliminary round ==
- All times are Philippine Standard Time (UTC+8:00).

=== Ranking ===
Pos	Team	Pld	W	L	Pts	SW	SL	SR	SPW	SPL	SPR	Qualification
1	PGJC-Navy Sea Lions	6	5	1	16	17	6	2.833	544	468	1.162	Semifinals
2	Cignal HD Spikers	6	5	1	15	16	3	5.333	465	388	1.198	Semifinals
3	NU-Sta. Elena Nationals	6	5	1	14	15	6	2.500	504	427	1.180	Semifinals
4	VNS-One Alicia Griffins	6	3	3	7	10	14	0.714	537	552	0.973	Semifinals
5	Santa Rosa City Lions	6	1	5	5	7	16	0.438	457	527	0.867	
6	Ateneo-Fudgee Barr Blue Eagles	6	1	5	4	6	16	0.375	451	512	0.881	
7	Army-Katinko Troopers	6	1	5	2	7	17	0.412	478	562	0.851	

=== Match results ===
Date	Time		Score		Set 1	Set 2	Set 3	Set 4	Set 5	Total	Report
30 Aug	14:30	Santa Rosa City Lions	0–3	Cignal HD Spikers	17–25	15–25	22–25			54–75	P2
30 Aug	17:30	VNS-One Alicia Griffins	3–2	Ateneo-Fudgee Barr Blue Eagles	25–21	22–25	25–20	23–25	15–9	110–100	P2
1 Sep	14:30	NU-Sta. Elena Nationals	3–1	Army-Katinko Troopers	20–25	25–20	25–16	25–12		95–73	P2
1 Sep	17:30	Ateneo-Fudgee Barr Blue Eagles	0–3	PGJC-Navy Sea Lions	22–25	19–25	19–25			60–75	P2
3 Sep	14:30	Cignal HD Spikers	3–0	Army-Katinko Troopers	25–15	25–14	25–19			75–48	P2
3 Sep	17:30	Santa Rosa City Lions	2–3	VNS-One Alicia Griffins	23–25	25–21	25–22	28–30	13–15	114–113	P2
6 Sep	14:30	PGJC-Navy Sea Lions	2–3	NU-Sta. Elena Nationals	25–17	26–24	19–25	24–26	16–18	110–110	P2
6 Sep	17:30	Ateneo-Fudgee Barr Blue Eagles	1–3	Santa Rosa City Lions	20–25	25–17	17–25	23–25		85–92	P2
8 Sep	14:30	VNS-One Alicia Griffins	0–3	Cignal HD Spikers	22–25	20–25	24–26			66–76	P2
8 Sep	17:30	PGJC-Navy Sea Lions	3–1	Army-Katinko Troopers	20–25	25–19	25–21	25–18		95–83	P2
10 Sep	14:30	Santa Rosa City Lions	0–3	NU-Sta. Elena Nationals	16–25	16–25	22–25			54–75	P2
10 Sep	17:30	Army-Katinko Troopers	1–3	Ateneo-Fudgee Barr Blue Eagles	30–32	15–25	25–16	15–25		85–98	P2
13 Sep	14:30	NU-Sta. Elena Nationals	3–0	VNS-One Alicia Griffins	33–31	25–17	25–18			83–66	P2
13 Sep	17:30	Cignal HD Spikers	1–3	PGJC-Navy Sea Lions	25–20	19–25	22–25	23–25		89–95	P2
15 Sep	14:30	Army-Katinko Troopers	3–2	Santa Rosa City Lions	25–21	22–25	25–21	17–25	15–6	104–98	P2
15 Sep	17:30	Cignal HD Spikers	3–0	Ateneo-Fudgee Barr Blue Eagles	25–14	25–23	25–22			75–59	P2
17 Sep	14:30	VNS-One Alicia	1–3	PGJC-Navy Sea Lions	25–19	18–25	17–25	21–25		81–94	P2
17 Sep	17:30	Ateneo-Fudgee Barr Blue Eagles	0–3	NU-Sta. Elena Nationals	14–25	16–25	19–25			49–75	P2
20 Sep	11:00	PGJC-Navy Sea Lions	3–0	Santa Rosa City Lions	25–12	25–11	25–22			75–45	P2
20 Sep	14:30	Army-Katinko Troopers	1–3	VNS-One Alicia Griffins	20–25	16–25	28–26	21–25		85–101	P2
20 Sep	17:30	NU-Sta. Elena Nationals	0–3	Cignal HD Spikers	22–25	22–25	22–25			66–75	P2

== Final round ==
- All times are Philippine Standard Time (UTC+8:00).

=== Semifinals ===
==== Ranking ====
Pos	Team	Pld	W	L	Pts	SW	SL	SR	SPW	SPL	SPR	Qualification
1	NU-Sta. Elena Nationals	3	3	0	8	9	3	3.000	279	253	1.103	Championship series
2	Cignal HD Spikers	3	2	1	7	8	3	2.667	255	232	1.099	Championship series
3	PGJC-Navy Sea Lions	3	1	2	3	3	6	0.500	200	218	0.917	3rd place series
4	VNS-One Alicia Griffins	3	0	3	0	1	9	0.111	216	247	0.874	3rd place series

==== Match results ====
Date	Time		Score		Set 1	Set 2	Set 3	Set 4	Set 5	Total	Report
22 Sep	14:30	PGJC-Navy Sea Lions	3–0	VNS-One Alicia Griffins	25–23	25–22	25–22			75–67	P2
22 Sep	17:30	Cignal HD Spikers	2–3	NU-Sta. Elena Nationals	25–20	25–22	23–25	21–25	10–15	104–107	P2
24 Sep	14:30	NU-Sta. Elena Nationals	3–0	PGJC-Navy Sea Lions	25–21	25–17	26–24			76–62	P2
24 Sep	17:30	VNS-One Alicia Griffins	0–3	Cignal HD Spikers	20–25	24–26	18–25			62–76	P2
27 Sep	14:30	VNS-One Alicia Griffins	1–3	NU-Sta. Elena Nationals	17–25	25–20	21–25	24–26		87–96	P2
27 Sep	17:30	PGJC-Navy Sea Lions	0–3	Cignal HD Spikers	22–25	21–25	20–25			63–75	P2

=== Finals ===
- All are best-of-three series.

==== 3rd place ====
- PGJC-Navy wins series, 2–0.

Date	Time		Score		Set 1	Set 2	Set 3	Set 4	Set 5	Total	Report
29 Sep	14:30	VNS-One Alicia Griffins	0–3	PGJC-Navy Sea Lions	20–25	19–25	21–25			60–75	P2
1 Oct	14:30	PGJC-Navy Sea Lions	3–1	VNS-One Alicia Griffins	26–28	25–18	25–16	25–23		101–85	P2

==== Championship ====
- NU-Sta. Elena wins series, 2–0.

Date	Time		Score		Set 1	Set 2	Set 3	Set 4	Set 5	Total	Report
29 Sep	17:30	Cignal HD Spikers	1–3	NU-Sta. Elena Nationals	21–25	25–20	23–25	18–25		87–95	P2
1 Oct	17:30	NU-Sta. Elena Nationals	3–1	Cignal HD Spikers	25–18	23–25	25–23	25–23		98–89	P2

== Awards ==
Award	Player	Team	Ref.
Conference Most Valuable Player	Nico Almendras	NU-Sta. Elena Nationals	
Finals Most Valuable Player	Buds Buddin	NU-Sta. Elena Nationals	
1st Best Outside Spiker	Marck Espejo	Cignal HD Spikers	
2nd Best Outside Spiker	John Benedict San Andres	VNS-One Alicia Griffins	
1st Best Middle Blocker	Obed Mukaba	NU-Sta. Elena Nationals	
2nd Best Middle Blocker	John Paul Bugaoan	Cignal HD Spikers	
Best Opposite Spiker	Ysrael Wilson Marasigan	Cignal HD Spikers	
Best Setter	Ave Joshua Retamar	NU-Sta. Elena Nationals	
Best Libero	Manuel Sumanguid III	Cignal HD Spikers	

== Final standings ==
Rank	Team
1st place, gold medalist(s)	NU-Sta. Elena Nationals
2nd place, silver medalist(s)	Cignal HD Spikers
3rd place, bronze medalist(s)	PGJC-Navy Sea Lions
4	VNS-One Alicia Griffins
5	Santa Rosa City Lions
6	Ateneo-Fudgee Barr Blue Eagles
7	Army-Katinko Troopers

2022 Spikers' Turf Open champions
NU-Sta. Elena Nationals
First title

Team roster:
Nico Almendras, Clarenz Belostrino, Ahmad Fajani Abdul, Mac Alvin Bandola, Kyle Adrien Ramones, Buds Buddin, Jan Mariano Sumagui, Louis Emmanuel Lumanlan, Obed Mukaba, Kennry Malinis, Ave Joshua Retamar (c), Marco Ely Maclang, Joseph Phillip Bello, Leo Aringo, Michael John Fortuna, Jenngerard Anfranz Diao
Head coach:
Dante Alinsunurin

== Statistics leaders ==
Statistics leaders correct at the end of the preliminary round.

Best scorers
Rank	Name	Points
1	Joshua Umandal	110
2	Jade Disquitado	97
3	John Benedict San Andres	93
4	Nico Almendras	78
5	Kennedy Batas	75

Best spikers
Rank	Name	%Succ
1	Joshua Umandal	47.85
2	Angelo Nicolas Almendras	46.48
3	Marck Espejo	45.04
4	Kevin Montemayor	43.67
5	Ysrael Wilson Marasigan	42.57

Best blockers
Rank	Name	Avg
1	Obed Mukaba	1.14
2	John Paul Bugaoan	0.89
3	Ave Joshua Retamar	0.67
4	Peter Quiel	0.52
5	Jenngerard Anfranz Diao	0.52

Best servers
Rank	Name	Avg
1	John Benedict San Andres	0.42
2	Jetlee Gopio	0.36
3	Obed Mukaba	0.33
4	Marck Espejo	0.32
5	Buds Buddin	0.29

Best diggers
Rank	Name	Avg
1	Jan Mariano Sumagui	2.29
2	Jhon Mark Espanso	2.26
3	Lance Andrei de Castro	2.05
4	{John Kenneth Bayking	2.00
5	Jack Kalingking	1.87

Best setters
Rank	Name	Avg
1	Ej Casaña	5.87
2	Ave Joshua Retamar	4.95
3	Owen Suarez	4.58
4	Esmilzo Joner Polvorosa	4.46
5	Mark Jason Baldos	4.43

Best receivers
Rank	Name	%Eff
1	Vince Lorenzo	65.37
2	Angelo Nicolas Almendras	57.50
3	Marck Espejo	56.67
4	Manuel Sumanguid III	52.00
5	John Benedict San Andres	67.43

== See also ==
- 2022 Premier Volleyball League Open Conference
