= Instituto Estetico Manila Phoenix Volley Masters =

- Full name: Instituto Estetico Manila Phoenix Volley Masters
- Short name: IEM
- Nickname: Volley Masters
- Founded: 2011
- Dissolved: 2019
- Manager: Reyvic Cerilles
- Captain: Jeffrey Jimenez (PATTS)
- League: Spikers' Turf
- 2019 Open: 7th place
- Championships: Shakey's V-League: 1

Uniforms
Home	Away

The Instituto Estetico Manila Phoenix Volley Masters (shortened as IEM Phoenix Volley Masters) were a men's volleyball team in the Philippines owned by Instituto Estetico Manila, a dental and dermatological clinic.

The team was established in 2011 and initially competed in tournaments overseas before taking their talents domestically in 2014 when they joined the Philippine Super Liga (PSL), though they only took part in one conference: the 2014 All-Filipino Conference.

Later that year, the team moved to the Shakey's V-League (SVL) following the establishment of its men's division, and won a championship in the 2014 Reinforced Open Conference. Since then, IEM stayed within the Sports Vision umbrella, competing in Spikers' Turf and the Premier Volleyball League (PVL) men's division until 2019.

== History ==
Cosmetic surgeon Reyvic Cerilles established a women's volleyball team in 2001 which took part in the two-woman tournament Club 650. Cerilles named it after Instituto Estetico Manila, his own clinic. The team became inactive in 2005. In 2011, the IEM volleyball team was revived as a men's side which went on to participate in club tournaments abroad such as in Thailand and Malaysia. In 2014, the team was invited to join the Philippine Super Liga. IEM also joined the Spikers' Turf.

== Final roster ==
IEM Phoenix Volley Masters
Number	Player	Position	Height
1	Michael Ian Conde (c)	Outside Hitter	
2	Carlo Almario	Libero	
4	Angelo Michael Torres		
5	Salvador Timbal		
6	Lorenze Santos		
8	Razzel Palisoc		
9	Juvie Mangarin	Libero	
10	Jerome Medallion		
11	Joeward Presnede		
12	Edward Arroyo		
13	Joven Camaganakan		
14	Mark Enciso	Opposite Hitter	
15	Jason Canlas	Outside Hitter	
16	John Carlo Desuyo	Setter	

Coaching staff

- Head Coach:
  Pathie Jamiri
- Assistant Coach:
  Romnick Samson

Team Staff

- Team Manager:
  Reyvic Cerilles
- Team Utility:

Medical Staff

- Team Physician:
  Gian Gonzales
- Physical Therapist:

== Honors ==
=== Team ===
Spikers’ Turf / Premier Volleyball League:

Season	Conference	Title	Source
2014	Reinforced	Champion	
2015	Open	8th place	
2015	Reinforced	5th place	
2016	Open	4th place	
2016	Reinforced	4th place	
2017 (Note: with the Premier Volleyball League)	Reinforced	5th place	
2017	Open	6th place	
2018	Reinforced	6th place	
2018	Open	7th place	
2019	Reinforced	8th place	
2019	Open	7th place	

Philippine Superliga:

Season	Conference	Title	Source
2014	All-Filipino	4th Place	
2014	Grand Prix	(did not compete)	
2015	All-Filipino	(no tournament)	
2015	Beach Challenge Cup	8th place	
2015	Grand Prix	(no tournament)	
2016	Invitational	(no tournament)	
2016	Beach Challenge Cup	(?)	
2016	All-Filipino	(no tournament)	
2016	Grand Prix	(no tournament)	
2017	Invitational	(no tournament)	
2017	Beach Challenge Cup	(?)	
2017	Beach Challenge Cup	(?)	
2017	All-Filipino	(no tournament)	
2017	Grand Prix	(no tournament)	

=== Individual ===
Spikers’ Turf / Premier Volleyball League:

Season	Conference	Award	Name	Source
2014	Reinforced	Best Setter	(Philippines) Rence Ordoñez	
2014	Reinforced	Best Spiker	(Philippines) Jeffrey Jimenez	
2014	Reinforced	Conference MVP	(Philippines) Jeffrey Jimenez	
2014	Reinforced	Finals' MVP	(Philippines) Jeffrey Jimenez	
2016	Open	Conference MVP	(Philippines) Greg Dolor	
2016	Open	Best Middle Blocker	(Philippines) Greg Dolor	
2016	Reinforced	Best Middle Blocker	(Philippines) Kheeno Franco	
2017	Reinforced	2nd Best Middle Blocker	(Philippines) Greg Dolor	
2017	Reinforced	Best Libero	(Philippines) Rence Melgar	

Philippine Superliga:

Season	Conference	Award	Name	Source
2014	All-Filipino	Best Middle Blocker	(Philippines) Alexis Faytaren	

== Team captains ==
Spikers’ Turf / Premier Volleyball League:

Season	Conference	Number	Name
2014	Reinforced	7	(Philippines) Rence Ordoñez
2015	Open	11	(Philippines) Rence Ordoñez
2015	Reinforced	11	(Philippines) Rence Ordoñez
2016	Open	7	(Philippines) Edan Canlas
2016	Reinforced	7	(Philippines) Edan Canlas
2017	Reinforced	9	(Philippines) Rence Ordoñez
2017	Open	7	(Philippines) Edan Canlas
2018	Reinforced	16	(Philippines) Gregorio Dolor
2018	Open	1	(Philippines) Jeffrey Jimenez
2019	Reinforced	1	(Philippines) Michael Conde
2019	Open	1	(Philippines) Michael Conde

Philippine Superliga:

Season	Conference	Number	Name
2014	All-Filipino	4	(Philippines) John Angelo Macalma
