= 2022 Spikers' Turf season =

Fifth season of the Spikers' Turf

- League: Spikers' Turf
- Sport: Volleyball
- Duration: August 30 – October 6, 2022
- Teams: 7
- Total attendance: 6,480
- TV partner: One Sports

Conference
- Open champions: NU-Sta. Elena Nationals
- Open runners-up: Cignal HD Spikers

Spiker's Turf seasons
- ← 2019 2023 →

The 2022 Spikers' Turf season was the sixth season of Spikers' Turf and the first season in three years due to the COVID-19 pandemic. Similar to the 2021 Premier Volleyball League season, this season only had the lone Open Conference, running from August 30 to October 6, 2022.

== Open Conference ==
The 2022 Spikers' Turf Open Conference was the fifteenth conference of the Spikers' Turf. The tournament were held at Paco Arena, Manila from 30 August to 6 October 2022 with a total of seven teams.

The Spikers' Turf returned after a three-year absence, with its last tournament played being the 2019 Open Conference.

NU-Sta. Elena Nationals defeated the reigning champions Cignal HD Spikers in the championship match best-of-three series to clinched their first ever gold of the tournament. Cignal HD Spikers gets their fourth silver. PGJC-Navy Sea Lions defeated VNS-One Alicia Griffins in the third place match best-of-three series and claimed their first bronze.

=== Participating teams ===
2022 Spikers' Turf Open Conference
Abbr.	Team	Affiliation	Head coach	Team captain
PAR	Philippine Army-Katinko Troopers	Greenstone Pharmaceutical HK, Inc. / Philippine Army	(Philippines) Melvin Carolino	(Philippines) Benjaylo Labide
ADMU	Ateneo-Fudgee Barr Blue Eagles	Ateneo De Manila University / Republic Biscuit Corporation	(Philippines) Timothy Sto. Tomas	(Philippines) Lance Andrei De Castro
CHD	Cignal HD Spikers	Cignal TV, Inc.	(Philippines) Dexter Clamor	(Philippines) Ysrael Wilson Marasigan
NU	NU-Sta. Elena Bulldogs	National University / Sta. Elena Construction and Development Corporation	(Philippines) Dante Alinsunurin	(Philippines) Ave Joshua Retamar
PJN	PGJC-Navy Sea Lions	Philippine Navy	(Philippines) Cecil Cruzada	(Philippines) Gregorio Dolor
SRC	Santa Rosa City Lions	Department of Education City Division of Sta. Rosa	(Philippines) Edward Jan Lirio	(Philippines) Chris Emmanuel Hernandez
VNS	VNS-One Alicia Griffins	VNS Management Group	(Philippines) Ralph Raymund Ocampo	(Philippines) John Benedict San Andres

=== Preliminary round ===
Pos	Team	Pld	W	L	Pts	SW	SL	SR	SPW	SPL	SPR	Qualification
1	PGJC-Navy Sea Lions	6	5	1	16	17	6	2.833	544	468	1.162	Semifinals
2	Cignal HD Spikers	6	5	1	15	16	3	5.333	465	388	1.198	Semifinals
3	NU-Sta. Elena Nationals	6	5	1	14	15	6	2.500	504	427	1.180	Semifinals
4	VNS-One Alicia Griffins	6	3	3	7	10	14	0.714	537	552	0.973	Semifinals
5	Santa Rosa City Lions	6	1	5	5	7	16	0.438	457	527	0.867	
6	Ateneo-Fudgee Barr Blue Eagles	6	1	5	4	6	16	0.375	451	512	0.881	
7	Army-Katinko Troopers	6	1	5	2	7	17	0.412	478	562	0.851	

=== Final round ===
==== Semifinals ====
Pos	Team	Pld	W	L	Pts	SW	SL	SR	SPW	SPL	SPR	Qualification
1	NU-Sta. Elena Nationals	3	3	0	8	9	3	3.000	279	253	1.103	Championship series
2	Cignal HD Spikers	3	2	1	7	8	3	2.667	255	232	1.099	Championship series
3	PGJC-Navy Sea Lions	3	1	2	3	3	6	0.500	200	218	0.917	3rd place series
4	VNS-One Alicia Griffins	3	0	3	0	1	9	0.111	216	247	0.874	3rd place series

==== 3rd place ====
- PGJC-Navy wins series, 2–0.

Date	Time		Score		Set 1	Set 2	Set 3	Set 4	Set 5	Total	Report
29 Sep	14:30	VNS-One Alicia Griffins	0–3	PGJC-Navy Sea Lions	20–25	19–25	21–25			60–75	P2
1 Oct	14:30	PGJC-Navy Sea Lions	3–1	VNS-One Alicia Griffins	26–28	25–18	25–16	25–23		101–85	P2

==== Championship ====
- NU-Sta. Elena wins series, 2–0.

Date	Time		Score		Set 1	Set 2	Set 3	Set 4	Set 5	Total	Report
29 Sep	17:30	Cignal HD Spikers	1–3	NU-Sta. Elena Nationals	21–25	25–20	23–25	18–25		87–95	P2
1 Oct	17:30	NU-Sta. Elena Nationals	3–1	Cignal HD Spikers	25–18	23–25	25–23	25–23		98–89	P2

=== Awards ===
Award	Player	Team	Ref.
Conference Most Valuable Player	Nico Almendras	NU-Sta. Elena Nationals	
Finals Most Valuable Player	Buds Buddin	NU-Sta. Elena Nationals	
1st Best Outside Spiker	Marck Espejo	Cignal HD Spikers	
2nd Best Outside Spiker	John Benedict San Andres	VNS-One Alicia Griffins	
1st Best Middle Blocker	Obed Mukaba	NU-Sta. Elena Nationals	
2nd Best Middle Blocker	John Paul Bugaoan	Cignal HD Spikers	
Best Opposite Spiker	Ysrael Wilson Marasigan	Cignal HD Spikers	
Best Setter	Ave Joshua Retamar	NU-Sta. Elena Nationals	
Best Libero	Manuel Sumanguid III	Cignal HD Spikers	

=== Final standings ===
Rank	Team
1st place, gold medalist(s)	NU-Sta. Elena Nationals
2nd place, silver medalist(s)	Cignal HD Spikers
3rd place, bronze medalist(s)	PGJC-Navy Sea Lions
4	VNS-One Alicia Griffins
5	Santa Rosa City Lions
6	Ateneo-Fudgee Barr Blue Eagles
7	Army-Katinko Troopers

== Conference results ==
Conference	Champion	Runners-up	3rd	4th	5th	6th	7th
Open	NU-Sta. Elena	Cignal HD	PGJC-Navy	VNS-One Alicia	Santa Rosa City	Ateneo-Fudgee Barr	Army-Katinko

== See also ==
- 2022 Premier Volleyball League season
