= Cagayan Valley Rising Suns =

Men's volleyball team in the Philippines

- Short name: Cagayan
- Nickname: Rising Suns
- Founded: 2015
- Dissolved: 2015
- Manager: Criselda Antonio
- League: Spikers' Turf
- 2015 Spikers' Turf First Conference: Runner-up

Uniforms
| Home | Away |

The Cagayan Valley Rising Suns were a men's volleyball team owned by the family of Alvaro Antonio and represented the Cagayan Valley region. The team competed in Spikers' Turf, but only lasted for one conference.

== Roster ==
Cagayan Valley Rising Suns
| No. | Last Name | First Name | Position | Ht. | Wt. | College | Birth Date |
| 1 | Gatdula | Rudy | Opposite Hitter | | kg | | |
| 2 | Pirante (c) | Warren | Opposite Hitter | | kg | | |
| 3 | Torres | Angelo | Middle Blocker | | kg | UE | |
| 4 | Torres | Peter Den Mar | Middle Blocker | 6'3 | kg | NU | |
| 6 | Ordoñez | Rhenz | Setter | | kg | | |
| 7 | Ramos | Erickson Joseph | Libero | | kg | | |
| 9 | Calderon | Aaron | Middle Blocker | 6'2 | kg | DLSU | |
| 10 | Zamora | Michael | Middle Blocker | | kg | | |
| 11 | Dizon | Lorenzo | Libero | | _ kg | | |
| 12 | Canlas | Eden | Outside Hitter | | kg | | |
| 14 | Paglinawan | Jan Berlin | Outside Hitter | 5'11 | kg | NU | |
| 15 | Espejo | Marck Jesus | Outside Hitter | 6'3 | _ kg | ADMU | March 1, 1997 (age 28) |
| 16 | Intal | Rex Emmanuel | Middle Blocker | 6'4 | kg | ADMU | September 7, 1994 (age 31) |
| 18 | Santos | Brendon | Setter | 5'10 | _ kg | DLSU | |

Coaching staff

- Head Coach:
  (Philippines) Ernesto Pamilar
- Assistant Coach(s):
  (Philippines) Norman Miguel

Team Staff

- Team Manager:
  (Philippines) Criselda Antonio
- Team Utility:

Trainers

- Trainers:
  (Philippines) Ariel Dela Cruz
  (Philippines) Jose Roque
- Strength and Conditioning Coach:
  (Philippines) Audrey Alano
  (Philippines) Kim Bejo

== Honors ==
=== Team ===
==== Spikers' Turf ====
| Season | Conference | Title | Remarks | Source |
|---|---|---|---|---|
| 2015 | First Conference | Runner-up | Defeated by PLDT, 3–1, 3-1 | |

==== Others ====
| Season | Tournament | Title | Remarks | Source |
|---|---|---|---|---|
| 2015 | Cagayan Friendship Games | 3rd Place | | |

=== Individual ===
| Season | Conference | Award | Name |
|---|---|---|---|
| 2015 | First Conference | 1st Best Spiker | Marck Espejo |
| 2015 | First Conference | 2nd Best Middle Blocker | Peter Den Mar Torres |
| 2015 | First Conference | Best libero | Erickson Joseph Ramos |
| 2015 | First Conference | Conference MVP | Marck Espejo |

== See also ==
- Cagayan Rising Suns (men's basketball team)
- Cagayan Valley Lady Rising Suns (women's volleyball team)
