= 2015 Spikers' Turf Reinforced Conference =

- Duration: October 10 – December 6, 2015
- Teams: 6

Results
- Champions: Cignal HD Spikers
- Runners-up: Philippine Air Force Air Spikers
- Third place: PLDT Home Ultera Ultra Fast Hitters
- Fourth place: Philippine Navy Sailors

Awards
- Conference MVP: Mark Gil Alfafara
- Finals MVP: Edward Ybañez
- Best OH: Mark Gil Alfafara; Nur Amid Madsairi
- Best MB: Peter Torres; Reyson Fuentes
- Best OPP: Reuben Inaudito
- Best Setter: Glacy Ralph Diezmo
- Best Libero: Sandy Montero

Spikers' Turf Reinforced Conference chronology
- 2016 >

Spikers' Turf conference chronology
- < 2015 Collegiate 2016 Open >

The 2015 Spikers' Turf Reinforced Conference was the third conference of Spikers' Turf and the 2015 season. The tournament started on October 10, 2015 at the Filoil Flying V Arena in San Juan.

== Teams ==
Abbr.	Team
CIG	Cignal HD Spikers
IEM	IEM Volley Masters
PAF	Philippine Air Force Air Men
PNV	Philippine Navy Sailors
PLD	PLDT Home Ultera Ultra Fast Hitters
STE (ACT)	Sta. Elena Construction Wrecking Balls

== Format ==
Preliminary round

- The preliminary round was a single round-robin tournament, with each team playing one match against all other teams for a total of five matches.
- The top four teams advanced to the semifinals while the bottom two were eliminated.

Semifinals

- The semifinals featured the twice-to-beat advantage. The higher-seeded team in a match-up only needed to win one out of two matches to advance while the lower-seeded team needed to win two matches back-to-back to do so.
- The match-ups were as follows:
  - SF1: #1 vs. #4
  - SF2: #2 vs. #3
- The winners advanced to the championship while the losers would play in the third-place series.

Finals

- The championship and third-place series were best-of-three series.
- The match-ups were as follows:
  - Championship: Semifinal round winners
  - Third-place series: Semifinal round losers
- If the championship ends after two matches, which can only occur if either team wins 2–0, the third-place series will immediately end even if it is tied. Tiebreakers would be used to determine the winner of the third-place series in this scenario.

== Pool standing procedure ==
- First, teams are ranked by the number of matches won.
- If the number of matches won is tied, the tied teams are then ranked by match points, wherein:
  - Match won 3–0 or 3–1: 3 match points for the winner, 0 match points for the loser.
  - Match won 3–2: 2 match points for the winner, 1 match point for the loser.
- In case of any further ties, the following criteria shall be used:
  - Set ratio: the number of sets won divided by number of sets lost.
  - Point ratio: number of points scored divided by number of points allowed.
  - Head-to-head standings: any remaining tied teams are ranked based on the results of head-to-head matches involving the teams in question.

== Preliminary round ==
Pos	Team	Pld	W	L	Pts	SW	SL	SR	SPW	SPL	SPR	Qualification
1	Philippine Air Force Air Men	5	4	1	12	13	5	2.600	427	398	1.073	Semifinals
2	Cignal HD Spikers	5	4	1	11	13	7	1.857	465	411	1.131	Semifinals
3	PLDT Home Ultera	5	3	2	9	10	8	1.250	428	388	1.103	Semifinals
4	Philippine Navy Sailors	5	2	3	5	7	12	0.583	410	446	0.919	Semifinals
5	IEM Volley Masters	5	1	4	4	8	12	0.667	431	468	0.921	
6	Sta. Elena Construction	5	1	4	4	6	13	0.462	403	453	0.890	

=== Match results ===
Date	Time		Score		Set 1	Set 2	Set 3	Set 4	Set 5	Total	Report
10/10	15:00	Philippine Air Force Air Men	3–1	IEM Volley Masters	25–19	25–27	25–22	25–20	–	100–88	P2
10/10	17:00	Philippine Navy Sailors	3–1	Sta. Elena Construction	25–21	21–25	25–19	25–18	–	96–83	P2
10/11	17:00	PLDT Home Ultera	0–3	Cignal HD Spikers	21–25	21–25	19–25	–	–	61–75	P2
10/17	15:00	Sta. Elena Construction	3–1	PLDT Home Ultera	25–22	25–21	14–25	29–27	–	93–95	P2
10/17	17:00	Cignal HD Spikers	1–3	Philippine Air Force Air Men	22–25	18–25	25–20	21–25	–	86–95	P2
10/24	15:00	Sta. Elena Construction	2–3	Cignal HD Spikers	25–23	25–22	16–25	20–25	9–15	95–110	P2
10/24	17:00	PLDT Home Ultera	3–1	IEM Volley Masters	25–18	20–25	25–15	25–18	–	95–76	P2
10/25	17:00	Philippine Navy Sailors	0–3	Philippine Air Force Air Men	21–25	21–25	18–25	–	–	60–75	
11/04	13:00	Philippine Air Force Air Men	3–0	Sta. Elena Construction	26–24	25–22	25–20	–	–	76–66	P2
11/04	15:00	Philippine Navy Sailors	0–3	PLDT Home Ultera	22–25	27–29	14–25	–	–	63–79	P2
11/04	17:00	Cignal HD Spikers	3–1	IEM Volley Masters	22–25	25–23	25–14	25–17	–	97–79	P2
11/07	15:00	IEM Volley Masters	3–0	Sta. Elena Construction	25–19	25–26	26–24	–	–	76–69	P2
11/07	17:00	Cignal HD Spikers	3–1	Philippine Navy Sailors	25–20	22–25	25–19	25–17	–	97–81	P2
11/08	17:00	PLDT Home Ultera	3–1	Philippine Air Force Air Men	23–25	25–21	25–21	25–14	–	98–81	P2
11/14	17:00	IEM Volley Masters	2–3	Philippine Navy Sailors	30–28	19–25	26–28	25–14	12–15	112–110	P2

== Bracket ==
Semifinals * – twice to beat advantage
1	Air Force*	3	–	–
4	Navy	2	–	–
2	Cignal HD Spikers*	3	–	–
3	PLDT	2	–	–

Finals best of three
Air Force	3	0	0
Cignal HD Spikers	1	3	3
3rd place
PLDT	3	3	–
Sta. Elena Ball Hammers	1	1	–

== Semifinals ==
=== Rank 1 vs Rank 4 ===
* Air Force Air Men (Rank #1) had the twice-to-beat advantage

Date	Time		Score		Set 1	Set 2	Set 3	Set 4	Set 5	Total	Report
11/15	15:00	Philippine Air Force Air Men	3–2	Philippine Navy Sailors	25–15	20–25	29–27	24–26	15–12	113–105	P2

=== Rank 2 vs Rank 3 ===
* Cignal HD Spikers (Rank #2) had the twice-to-beat advantage

Date	Time		Score		Set 1	Set 2	Set 3	Set 4	Set 5	Total	Report
11/15	12:45	Cignal HD Spikers	3–2	PLDT Home Ultera	25–22	21–25	25–23	11–25	15–8	97–103	P2

== Third place series ==
November 21, 2015; 13:00	PLDT Home Ultera	3–1	Philippine Navy	Filoil Flying V Arena; Attendance: 410; Referees: P. Sison, E. Gaa
November 21, 2015; 13:00	(25–14, 25–22, 23–25, 25–19); Match Result P2; POG: No. 16 Kheeno Franco with 12 attacks, 2 blocks & 2 service aces			Filoil Flying V Arena; Attendance: 410; Referees: P. Sison, E. Gaa

November 25, 2015; 13:00	Philippine Navy	1–3	PLDT Home Ultera	Filoil Flying V Arena; Attendance: 561; Referees: J. Villareal, G. Vargas
November 25, 2015; 13:00	(29–31, 25–20, 21–25, 15–25); Match Result P2; POG: No. 8 Mark Gil Alfafara with 19 attacks, 1 block & 1 service ace			Filoil Flying V Arena; Attendance: 561; Referees: J. Villareal, G. Vargas

PLDT Home Ultera won the series in two games

== Finals ==
November 21, 2015; 15:00	Philippine Air Force	3–1	Cignal HD Spikers	Filoil Flying V Arena; Attendance: 420; Referees: L. Benito Jr., R. Roxas
November 21, 2015; 15:00	(25–15, 19–25, 25–21, 25–21); Match Result P2; POG: No. 5 Jeffrey Malabanan with 15 attacks, 1 block & 1 service ace			Filoil Flying V Arena; Attendance: 420; Referees: L. Benito Jr., R. Roxas

November 25, 2015; 15:00	Cignal HD Spikers	3–0	Philippine Air Force	Filoil Flying V Arena; Attendance: 825; Referees: A. Tabañag, L. Pajarillo
November 25, 2015; 15:00	(25–16, 25–17, 25–18); Match Result P2; POG: No. 18 Edmar Bonono with 15 attacks, 2 blocks & 2 service aces			Filoil Flying V Arena; Attendance: 825; Referees: A. Tabañag, L. Pajarillo

December 6, 2015; 17:00	Philippine Air Force	0–3	Cignal HD Spikers	Filoil Flying V Arena; Attendance: 1,045; Referees: L. Pajarillo, A. Tabañag
December 6, 2015; 17:00	(17–25, 30–32, 23–25); Match Result P2; POG: No. 18 Edmar Bonono with 6 attacks, 3 blocks & 1 service ace			Filoil Flying V Arena; Attendance: 1,045; Referees: L. Pajarillo, A. Tabañag

Cignal HD Spikers won the series in three games

== Awards ==
- Most valuable player (Finals)
  - Edward Ybañez (Cignal)
- Most valuable player (Conference)
  - Mark Gil Alfafara (PLDT)
- Best setter
  - Glacy Ralph Diezmo (Cignal)
- Best Outside Spikers
  - Mark Gil Alfafara (PLDT)
  - Nur Amid Madsairi (Navy)
- Best middle blockers
  - Peter Den Mar Torres (PLDT)
  - Reyson Fuentes (Air Force)
- Best opposite spiker
  - Reuben Inaudito (Air Force)
- Best libero
  - Sandy Montero (Cignal)

== Final standings ==
Rank	Team
1st place, gold medalist(s)	Cignal HD Spikers
2nd place, silver medalist(s)	Philippine Air Force
3rd place, bronze medalist(s)	PLDT Home Ultera Ultra Fast Hitters
4	Philippine Navy
5	IEM Volley Masters
6	Sta. Elena Construction

Spikers' Turf 1st Season Reinforced Open Conference Champions
Cignal HD Spikers
1st title
Team roster

Sandy Montero (L), Jay Dela Cruz (c), Ralph Diezmo, Red Christensen, Lorenzo Capate Jr., Gilbert Ablan, Redentor Relata, Aaron Calderon, Edward Ybañez, Jeffrey Lansangan, Alexis Faytaren, Herschel Ramos, Mark Lee, Edmar Bonono
Michael Cariño (Head Coach), Sammy Acaylar (Asst. Coach), Dexter Clamor (Asst. Coach)

Note
(c) – Team Captain
(L) – Libero

== Venue ==
- Filoil Flying V Arena, San Juan

== See also ==
- Shakey's V-League 12th Season Reinforced Open Conference
