= PLDT men's volleyball team =

Philippine professional volleyball team

PLDT
- Founded: 2013
- Dissolved: 2019
- League: Philippine Super Liga (2013–2014); Spikers' Turf (2015–2017); Premier Volleyball League (2017–2018)
- Championships: Spikers' Turf: 1, MVP Olympics: 1, PSL: 2

The PLDT myDSL Speed Boosters, later known as PLDT Home Fibr Power Hitters, was a men's volleyball team owned and operated by PLDT. The team competed from 2013 to 2015, and again from 2018 to 2019, under various names reflecting PLDT's internet service brands.

PLDT had a women's counterpart, initially the 2013–2018 PLDT team and later the team now known as the PLDT High Speed Hitters.

== History ==
The club debuted in 2013 with the women's team debuting first as the PLDT myDSL Speed Boosters women's team in the Philippine Superliga (PSL) during the 2013 Invitational Conference. The men's team would follow debuting in the following conference.

In 2014, while participating in the PSL, the club joined in the Shakey's V-League with its women's team as the PLDT Home Telpad Turbo Boosters during the 2014 Open Conference.

The club ended its participation in the PSL after the 2014 season. In 2015, the club competed under the name PLDT Home Ultera Ultra Fast Hitters and the men's team joined the 2015 Open Conference of the Spikers' Turf, becoming its first champion.

The club became dormant in 2016 and 2017. It returned to active competition in 2018 in the Premier Volleyball League (formerly, Shakey's V-League and Spikers’ Turf) as the PayMaya High Flyers (women's) and the PLDT Home Fibr Ultra Fast Hitters (men's).

In September 2018, the women's team was merged with the Smart Prepaid Giga Hitters, its affiliate team in the PSL. The Smart team was renamed the PLDT Home Fibr Power Hitters in February 2019.

== Name changes ==
Season	Name
2013	PLDT myDSL Speed Boosters (PSL)
2014	PLDT Home TVolution-Air Force Power Attackers (PSL); PLDT Home Telpad-Air Force Turbo Boosters (PSL)
2015	PLDT Home Ultera Ultra Fast Hitters (Spikers' Turf)
2016–17	inactive
2018	PLDT Home Fibr Ultra Fast Hitters (PVL)
2019	PLDT Home Fibr Power Hitters (PVL/Spikers' Turf)

== Final roster ==
PLDT Home Fibr Power Hitters
Number	Player	Position	Height
2	(Philippines) Richard Solis	Outside hitter	
3	(Philippines) Patrick Vecina	Outside hitter	1.78 m (5 ft 10 in)
4	(Philippines) Ronjay Galang	Outside hitter	1.89 m (6 ft 2 in)
6	(Philippines) Ronchelle Lee Villegas	Setter	
7	(Philippines) Jayvee Sumagaysay	Middle blocker	1.85 m (6 ft 1 in)
8	(Philippines) Mark Gil Alfafara	Opposite hitter	1.88 m (6 ft 2 in)
9	(Philippines) Paolo Pablico	Outside hitter	1.85 m (6 ft 1 in)
10	(Philippines) John Vic de Guzman (c)	Outside hitter	1.85 m (6 ft 1 in)
11	(Philippines) Joshua Umandal	Opposite hitter	
12	(Philippines) Kris Cian Silang	Setter	
15	(Philippines) Peter Quiel	Middle blocker	
16	(Philippines) Kheeno Franco	Middle blocker	1.85 m (6 ft 1 in)
18	(Philippines) Gilbert Longevela	Libero	1.73 m (5 ft 8 in)
20	(Philippines) Henry James Pecaña	Libero	1.85 m (6 ft 1 in)

Coaching staff

- Head coach:
  (Philippines) Arthur Alan "Odjie" Mámon
- Assistant coach:
  (Philippines) Rolando Casillan

== Honors ==
=== Team ===
Spikers' Turf/Premier Volleyball League:

Season	Conference	Title	Source
2015	Open	Champion	
2015	Reinforced	3rd place	
2016	Open	(did not compete)	
2016	Reinforced	(did not compete)	
2017 (Note: with the Premier Volleyball League.)	Reinforced	(did not compete)	
2017	Open	(did not compete)	
2018	Reinforced	4th place	
2018	Open	Runner-up	
2019	Reinforced	3rd place	
2019	Open	6th place	

Philippine SuperLiga:

Season	Conference	Title	Source
2013	Grand Prix	Champion	
2014	All-Filipino	Champion	
2014	Grand Prix	Runner-up	

Others:

Season	Tournament	Title	Source
2016	MVP Olympics	Champion	

=== Individual ===
Spikers' Turf/Premier Volleyball League:

Season	Conference	Award	Name	Source
2015	Open	2nd Best Outside Spiker	(Philippines) John Paul Torres	
2015	Open	Best Opposite Spiker	(Philippines) Mark Gil Alfafara	
2015	Open	Finals MVP	(Philippines) Mark Gil Alfafara	
2015	Reinforced	1st Best Middle Blocker	(Philippines) Peter Den Mar Torres	
2015	Reinforced	1st Best Outside Spiker	(Philippines) Mark Gil Alfafara	
2015	Reinforced	Conference MVP	(Philippines) Mark Gil Alfafara	
2018	Reinforced	Best Opposite Spiker	(Philippines) John Vic De Guzman	
2018	Reinforced	Best Setter	(Philippines) Ronchette Lee Villegas	
2018	Reinforced	Best Libero	(Philippines) Rence Melgar	
2018	Open	Best Setter	(Philippines) Ronchette Lee Villegas	
2018	Open	2nd Best Middle Blocker	(Philippines) Jayvee Sumagaysay	
2019	Reinforced	Best Opposite Spiker	(Philippines) John Vic De Guzman	

Philippine Superliga:

Season	Conference	Award	Name	Source
2013	Grand Prix	Best Libero	(Philippines) Gilbert Longavilla	
2013	Grand Prix	Best Opposite	(Philippines) Henry Pecaña	
2013	Grand Prix	Best Setter	(Philippines) Rolando Casillan	
2013	Grand Prix	MVP	(Philippines) Kheeno Franco	
2014	All-Filipino	Best Libero	(Philippines) Raffy Mosuela	
2014	All-Filipino	Best Setter	(Philippines) Jessie Lopez	
2014	All-Filipino	1st Best Outside Spiker	(Philippines) Alnakran Abdilla	
2014	All-Filipino	MVP	(Philippines) Alnakran Abdilla	
2014	Grand Prix	1st Best Outside Spiker	(Philippines) Alnakran Abdilla	

== Team captains ==
- (Philippines) Richard Gomez (2013)
- (Philippines) Dante Alinsunirin (2014)
- (Philippines) Ronaldo Casillan (2015)
- (Philippines) John Vic de Guzman (2018 Reinforced)
- (Philippines) Henry James Pecaña (2018 Open)

== Head coach ==
- Odjie Mamon (2015–2019)

== See also ==
- PLDT women's volleyball team (2013–2018)
- PLDT High Speed Hitters
- PLDT Home TVolution (2014 Asian Men's Club Volleyball Championship team)
- Cignal HD Spikers (women)
- Cignal HD Spikers (men)
