= 2018 Spikers' Turf Open Conference =

Third conference of the 2018 PVL men's division/Spikers' Turf season

- Duration: October 6 – December 14, 2018
- Teams: 10
- TV partner(s): Hyper TV

Results
- Champions: Philippine Air Force Agilas
- Runners-up: PLDT Home Fibr Power Hitters
- Third place: Cignal HD Spikers
- Fourth place: Sta. Elena–NU Ball Hammers

Awards
- Conference MVP: Bryan Bagunas
- Finals MVP: Alnakran Abdilla
- Best OH: Alnakran Abdilla; Bryan Bagunas
- Best MB: Peter Torres; Jayvee Sumagaysay
- Best OPP: Ysay Marasigan
- Best Setter: Ronchette Lee Villegas
- Best Libero: Ricky Marcos

Spikers' Turf Open Conference chronology
- < 2017 (PVL) 2019 >

Spikers' Turf conference chronology
- < 2018 Collegiate (PVL) 2019 Reinforced >

The 2018 Spikers’ Turf Open Conference was the third and final conference of the 2018 Premier Volleyball League men's division/Spikers' Turf season. The tournament began on October 6, 2018 at the Blue Eagle Gym, Ateneo de Manila University campus, Quezon City, Philippines.

== Teams ==
2018 Spikers’ Turf Open Conference
Abbr.	Team	Company	Colors	Head coach	Team captain
ADMU	Ateneo Blue Eagles-Fudgee Barr	Ateneo de Manila University and Republic Biscuit Corporation		Timothy James Sto. Tomas	Jasper Rodney Tan
ARM	Philippine Army Troopers	Philippine Army		Rico de Guzman	Benjaylo Labide
CIG	Cignal HD Spikers	Cignal TV, Inc.		Oliver Allan Almadro	Ysrael Wilson Marasigan
FUR	Fury Blazing Hitters	Cafe Lupe Hostel & Restaurant		Ralph Ocampo	Phillip Michael Bagalay
IEM	IEM Volley Masters	Instituto Estetico Manila		Rafael Presnede	Jeffrey Jimenez
PLDT	PLDT Home Fibr Power Hitters	PLDT		Arthur Mamon	Henry James Pecaña
PAF	Philippine Air Force Agilas	Philippine Air Force		Rhovyl Verayo	Jessie Lopez
PNV	Philippine Navy Fighting Stingrays	Philippine Navy		Bob Malenab	Milover Parcon
FEU	Prima–FEU Tamaraws	Far Eastern University		Reynaldo Diaz Jr.	Owen Suarez
NUI	Sta. Elena–NU Bulldogs	Sta. Elena Construction and Development Corporation		Dante Alinsunurin	Francis Philip Saura

== Format ==
Preliminary round

The ten teams compete in a single round-robin tournament, with each team playing one match against all other teams for a total of nine matches. The top four teams will advance to the semifinals while the bottom six will be eliminated and ranked 5th through 10th in the final standings.

Semifinals

The top four teams from the preliminary round compete in the semifinals. Teams compete in best-of-three series with the winners advancing to the finals while the losers will compete in the third place series. The match-ups for the semifinals are as follows:

- SF1: PR #1 vs. PR #4
- SF2: PR #2 vs. PR #3

Third place series

The losing teams from the semifinals compete in a best-of-three series to determine which team will finish third in this conference. If the series is tied at 1–1 when the championship is decided, the pool standing procedure will be used (starting from set ratio).

Finals

The winning teams from the semifinals compete in a best-of-three series to determine the conference champions. The losing team in this round will be declared conference runners-up.

== Pool standing procedure ==
Teams are initially ranked by wins followed by match points. A win awards three points if the match lasted for three or four sets (3–0 or 3–1), or two points if the match lasted for five sets (3–2). A loss only awards one point if the match lasted for five sets (2–3).

If multiple teams tie for wins and match points, the next criteria are set ratio (the number of sets won divided by number of sets lost across all matches) and point ratio (the number of points won divided by number of points lost across all matches). If any teams are still tied, the procedure will be applied again, but only considering matches between the remaining tied teams.

== Preliminary round ==
=== Team standings ===
Pos	Team	Pld	W	L	Pts	SW	SL	SR	SPW	SPL	SPR	Qualification
1	Sta. Elena–NU Ball Hammers	9	7	2	20	24	11	2.182	808	738	1.095	Final round
2	PLDT Power Hitters	9	7	2	20	24	13	1.846	837	766	1.093	Final round
3	Philippine Air Force Agilas	9	7	2	18	22	14	1.571	794	755	1.052	Final round
4	Cignal HD Spikers	9	6	3	20	23	11	2.091	789	706	1.118	Final round
5	Prima–FEU	9	5	4	17	22	15	1.467	838	803	1.044	
6	Ateneo–Fudgee Bar	9	5	4	16	19	16	1.188	779	744	1.047	
7	Philippine Navy Fighting Stingrays	9	4	5	12	15	18	0.833	728	747	0.975	
8	IEM Volley Masters	9	2	7	7	11	22	0.500	715	792	0.903	
9	Philippine Army Troopers	9	2	7	4	8	25	0.320	719	775	0.928	
10	Fury Blazing Hitters	9	0	9	1	4	27	0.148	602	769	0.783	

=== Match results ===
- All times are in Philippines Standard Time (UTC+08:00)

Date	Time		Score		Set 1	Set 2	Set 3	Set 4	Set 5	Total	Report
Oct 06	11:00	CIG	3–1	PRI	25–17	25–20	21–25	25–21		96–83	P–2
Oct 06	13:00	FUR	0–3	ADM	15–25	17–25	15–25			47–75	P–2
Oct 06	15:00	IEM	1–3	PLD	20–25	18–25	25–23	19–25		82–98	P–2
Oct 09	11:00	ARM	0–3	PNV	23–25	20–25	15–25			58–75	P–2
Oct 09	13:00	PAF	3–2	STE	25–22	21–25	25–23	14–25	15–10	100–105	P–2
Oct 09	15:00	ADM	3–1	IEM	25–22	25–22	22–25	25–23		97–92	P–2
Oct 11	11:00	PLD	3–0	PAF	25–19	25–12	25–21			75–52	P–2
Oct 11	13:00	STE	3–1	ARM	25–18	20–25	30–28	26–24		101–95	P–2
Oct 11	15:00	PNV	3–1	CIG	25–21	22–25	25–23	25–18		97–87	P–2
Oct 12	13:00	PRI	3–0	FUR	25–15	25–22	25–19			75–56	P–2
Oct 12	15:00	ADM	2–3	PLD	17–25	25–17	18–25	25–20	12–15	97–102	P–2 a
Oct 16	11:00	ARM	0–3	ADM	21–25	22–25	18–25			61–75	P–2
Oct 16	13:00	FUR	0–3	CIG	21–25	19–25	19–26			59–76	P–2
Oct 16	15:00	STE	3–0	IEM	25–18	27–25	25–17			77–60	
Oct 18	11:00	IEM	1–3	PAF	25–22	17–25	22–25	13–25		77–97	P–2
Oct 18	13:00	PLD	3–1	ARM	25–22	20–25	25–21	25–22		95–90	P–2
Oct 18	15:00	PNV	3–0	FUR	25–22	25–22	25–22			75–66	P–2
Oct 19	13:00	CIG	3–1	STE	22–25	25–11	25–19	25–22		97–77	P–2
Oct 19	15:00	PRI	3–2	ADM	25–20	19–25	29–27	21–25	16–14	110–111	P–2
Oct 25	13:00	ARM	3–2	PRI	27–25	22–25	25–23	19–25	15–12	108–110	
Oct 25	15:00	STE	3–0	PNV	25–22	25–20	25–18			75–60	
Oct 27	10:00	CIG	2–3	PAF	18–25	25–20	29–31	25–18	9–15	106–109	
Oct 27	12:00	PRI	3–0	PNV	25–20	25–23	25–23			75–66	
Oct 30	11:00	PNV	3–2	IEM	25–23	21–25	18–25	27–25	15–8	106–106	P–2
Oct 30	13:00	PLD	2–3	STE	26–24	18–25	25–20	17–25	11–15	97–109	P–2
Oct 30	15:00	ARM	3–2	FUR	25–27	25–27	30–28	25–13	15–9	120–104	P–2
Nov 14	11:00	FUR	1–3	PLD	19–25	13–25	25–22	18–25		75–97	
Nov 14	13:00	CIG	3–0	IEM	25–22	25–19	27–25			77–66	
Nov 14	15:00	ARM	0–3	PAF	25–27	24–26	22–25			71–78	
Nov 16	13:00	STE	3–2	PRI	27–25	25–18	21–25	21–25	16–14	110–107	
Nov 16	15:00	PNV	2–3	ADM	20–25	21–25	25–22	25–22	12–15	103–109	
Nov 20	11:00	PLD	3–0	PNV	25–23	25–19	25–20			75–62	P–2
Nov 20	13:00	PRI	3–0	IEM	25–21	26–24	25–12			76–57	P–2
Nov 20	15:00	ADM	0–3	CIG	22–25	18–25	20–25			60–75	P–2
Nov 22	11:00	PAF	3–2	PRI	23–25	20–25	25–20	25–23	15–11	108–104	P–2
Nov 22	13:00	FUR	0–3	STE	26–28	21–25	13–25			60–78	P–2
Nov 22	15:00	IEM	3–0	ARM	26–24	25–23	25–22			76–69	P–2
Nov 23	13:00	PLD	3–2	CIG	21–25	20–25	25–20	25–16	17–25	108–111	P–2
Nov 23	15:00	ADM	3–1	PAF	25–18	18–25	25–21	25–15		93–79	P–2
Nov 27	11:00	PAF	3–1	PNV	21–25	25–20	25–19	25–20		96–84	
Nov 27	13:00	FUR	1–3	IEM	25–23	30–32	17–25	17–25		89–105	
Nov 27	15:00	PRI	3–1	PLD	23–25	25–21	25–22	25–22		98–90	
Nov 29	11:00	CIG	3–0	ARM	25–12	25–17	25–18			75–47	
Nov 29	13:00	PAF	3–0	FUR	25–11	25–13	25–16			75–40	
Nov 29	15:00	STE	3–0	ADM	25–22	25–19	25–21			75–62	

== Bracket ==
Semifinals; Best-of-three series
1	~~Sta. Elena~~	2
4	Cignal	1
2	PLDT	2
3	Air Force	1

Finals play-off One game play-off
3	Air Force	1
4	Cignal	0

Finals; PLDT has twice-to-beat advantage
2	PLDT	0
3	Air Force	2

== Semifinals ==
=== (1) Sta. Elena vs. (4) Cignal ===
Date	Time		Score		Set 1	Set 2	Set 3	Set 4	Set 5	Total	Report
Dec 03	13:00	STE	0–3	CIG	19–25	22–25	24–26			65–76	[P–2]
Dec 05	15:00	CIG	2–3	STE	25–23	25–22	18–25	16–25	16–18	100–113	[P–2]
Dec 07	13:00	STE	3–0	CIG	27–25	28–26	25–22			80–73	[P–2]

=== (2) PLDT vs. (3) Air Force ===
Date	Time		Score		Set 1	Set 2	Set 3	Set 4	Set 5	Total	Report
Dec 03	15:00	PLD	0–3	PAF	23–25	23–25	21–25			67–75	[P–2]
Dec 05	13:00	PAF	2–3	PLD	25–23	21–25	18–25	25–15	12–15	101–103	[P–2]
Dec 07	15:00	PLD	3–1	PAF	25–23	18–25	25–23	25–17		93–88	[P–2]

== Finals playoff ==
Sta. Elena, who won the semifinal match against Cignal, withdrew from the tournament to represent the Philippines at the 2018 ASEAN University Games in Myanmar. Since PLDT already clinched a berth to the finals, the two semifinal losers competed in a one-match playoff to determine the second finalist. The match would also determine the third place team in this tournament.

Date	Time		Score		Set 1	Set 2	Set 3	Set 4	Set 5	Total	Report
Dec 09	14:00	PAF	3–1	CIG	18–25	25–18	25–17	25–16		93–76	

== Finals ==
Date	Time		Score		Set 1	Set 2	Set 3	Set 4	Set 5	Total	Report
Dec 11	15:00	PAF	3–1	PLD	25–23	22–25	26–24	28–26		101–98	
Dec 14	15:00	PLD	2–3	PAF	19–25	25–18	23–25	25–22	10–15	102–105	

2018 Open Conference Champions
Philippine Air Force Agilas
Alnakran Abdilla, Jeffrey Malabanan (c), Sandy Montero, Patrick Balse, Raffy Mosuela, Niño Jeruz, Rodolfo Labrador Jr.,
Reuben Inaudito, Howard Mojica, Jessie Lopez, Edwin Tolentino, Pitrus De Ocampo, Head Coach: Rhovyl Verayo

== Awards ==
Award		Player	Ref.
Most Valuable Player	Finals	Alnakran Abdilla (Air Force)	
Most Valuable Player	Conference	Bryan Bagunas (Sta. Elena–NU)	
Best Outside Spikers	1st: 2nd:	Alnakran Abdilla (Air Force); Bryan Bagunas (Sta. Elena–NU)	
Best Middle Blockers	1st: 2nd:	Peter Den Mar Torres (Cignal); Jayvee Sumagaysay (PLDT)	
Best Opposite Spiker		Ysrael Wilson Marasigan (Cignal)	
Best Setter		Ronchette Lee Villegas (PLDT)	
Best Libero		Ricky Marcos (Sta. Elena–NU)	

== Final standings ==
Rank	Team
1st place, gold medalist(s)	Philippine Air Force Agilas
2nd place, silver medalist(s)	PLDT Home Fibr Power Hitters
3rd place, bronze medalist(s)	Cignal HD Spikers
4	Sta. Elena–NU Ball Hammers
5	Prima–FEU Tamaraws
6	Ateneo Blue Eagles–Fudgee Bar
7	Philippine Navy Fighting Stingrays
8	IEM Volley Masters
9	Philippine Army Troopers
10	Fury Blazing Hitters

== Venue ==
- Blue Eagle Gym

== Broadcast partner ==
- Hyper TV

== See also ==
- 2018 Premier Volleyball League Open Conference
