= 2019 Spikers' Turf Reinforced Conference =

- Duration: May 19 – July 21, 2019
- Teams: 12
- TV partner(s): One Sports

Results
- Champions: Cignal HD Spikers
- Runners-up: Philippine Air Force Jet Spikers
- Third place: PLDT Home Fibr Power Hitters
- Fourth place: Sta. Elena Ball Hammers

Awards
- Conference MVP: Ranran Abdilla
- Finals MVP: Marck Espejo
- Best OH: Ranran Abdilla; Marck Espejo
- Best MB: Berhashidin Daymil; Kim Malabunga
- Best OPP: John Vic De Guzman
- Best Setter: Vince Mangulabnan
- Best Libero: Manuel Sumanguid III

Spikers' Turf Reinforced Conference chronology
- < 2018

Spikers' Turf conference chronology
- < 2018 Reinforced 2019 Open >

The 2019 Spikers' Turf Reinforced Conference was the first conference of the 2019 season of Spikers' Turf and the fifth running of the Reinforced Conference. The tournament began on May 19, 2019 at the Paco Arena and ended on July 21, 2019.

== Participating teams ==
2019 Spikers’ Turf Reinforced Conference
Abbr.	Team	Affiliation	Colors	Head coach	Team Captain
ANM	Animo Green Blazing Spikers	De La Salle University / De La Salle–College of Saint Benilde		Aaron Velez	Kevin Magsino
CIG	Cignal HD Spikers	Cignal TV, Inc.		Dexter Clamor	Ysrael Wilson Marasigan
ESY	Easy Trip–Raimol	Easytrip Services Corporation Philippines and Rainchem International, Inc.		Jose Roque	Red Christensen
IEM	IEM Phoenix Volley Masters	Instituto Estetico Manila		Pathie Jamiri	Michael Conde
PAF	Philippine Air Force Jet Spikers	Philippine Air Force		Rhovyl Verayo	Pitrus De Ocampo
PAR	Philippine Army Troopers	Philippine Army		Rico de Guzman	Patrick John Rojas
PCG	Philippine Coast Guard Dolphins	Philippine Coast Guard		Jeffrey Dela Cruz	Al-frazin Abdulwahab
PHI	Rebisco-Philippines	Philippines men's national volleyball team / Republic Biscuit Corporation		Dante Alinsunurin	John Vic De Guzman
PLD	PLDT Home Fibr Power Hitters	Philippine Long Distance Telephone Company		Arthur Mamon	Henry James Pecaña
PNV	Philippine Navy Sea Lions	Philippine Navy		Edgardo Rusit	Relan Taneo
STE	Sta. Elena Ball Hammers	Sta. Elena Construction and Development Corporation		Dante Alinsunurin	Edward Camposano
VNS	VNS Griffins	Cafe Lupe Hostel & Restaurant		Ralph Ocampo	Guel Asia

== Format ==
Preliminary round

- The preliminary round was a single round-robin tournament, with each team playing one match against all other teams for a total of 11 matches.
- The top four teams advanced to the semifinals while the bottom eight were eliminated.

Semifinals

- The semifinals featured best-of-three series.
- The match-ups were as follows:
  - SF1: #1 vs. #4
  - SF2: #2 vs. #3
- The winners advanced to the championship while the losers would play in the third-place series.

Finals

- The championship and third-place series were best-of-three series.
- The match-ups were as follows:
  - Championship: Semifinal round winners
  - Third-place series: Semifinal round losers

== Pool standing procedure ==
- First, teams are ranked by the number of matches won.
- If the number of matches won is tied, the tied teams are then ranked by match points, wherein:
  - Match won 3–0 or 3–1: 3 match points for the winner, 0 match points for the loser.
  - Match won 3–2: 2 match points for the winner, 1 match point for the loser.
- In case of any further ties, the following criteria shall be used:
  - Set ratio: the number of sets won divided by number of sets lost.
  - Point ratio: number of points scored divided by number of points allowed.
  - Head-to-head standings: any remaining tied teams are ranked based on the results of head-to-head matches involving the teams in question.

== Preliminary round ==
=== Team standings ===
Pos	Team	Pld	W	L	Pts	SW	SL	SR	SPW	SPL	SPR	Qualification
1	Cignal HD Spikers	11	10	1	30	31	4	7.750	859	660	1.302	Final round
2	Philippine Air Force Jet Spikers	11	10	1	26	30	14	2.143	1011	924	1.094	Final round
3	PLDT Power Hitters	11	8	3	25	27	12	2.250	893	811	1.101	Final round
4	Philippine National Team	11	8	3	24	28	14	2.000	997	859	1.161	
5	Sta. Elena Ball Hammers	11	7	4	20	24	17	1.412	971	948	1.024	Final round
6	Philippine Army Troopers	11	6	5	14	19	25	0.760	897	984	0.912	
7	Philippine Navy Sea Lions	11	5	6	18	21	23	0.913	966	968	0.998	
8	Animo Green Spikers	11	5	6	13	20	26	0.769	980	1037	0.945	
9	IEM Volley Masters	11	4	7	13	19	25	0.760	979	1016	0.964	
10	VNS Griffins	11	2	9	9	14	28	0.500	951	1004	0.947	
11	Easy Trip–Raimol	11	1	10	4	11	32	0.344	865	1007	0.859	
12	Philippine Coast Guard Dolphins	11	0	11	2	9	33	0.273	846	997	0.849	

=== Match results ===
- All times are in Philippines Standard Time (UTC+08:00)

Date	Time		Score		Set 1	Set 2	Set 3	Set 4	Set 5	Total	Report
May 19	13:00	VNS	0–3	STE	33–35	20–25	22–25			75–85	
May 19	15:00	PCG	0–3	CIG	16–25	13–25	21–25			50–75	
May 19	17:00	IEM	0–3	PLD	21–25	24–26	17–25			62–76	
May 21	13:00	ESY	1–3	PNV	22–25	17–25	25–20	18–25		82–95	
May 21	15:00	PAF	3–0	PAR	25–23	25–13	25–18			75–54	
May 21	17:00	PHI	3–1	VNS	30–32	25–19	25–15	25–22		105–88	
May 23	13:00	IEM	1–3	PNV	20–25	25–20	24–26	18–25		87–96	
May 23	15:00	PLD	3–0	ANM	25–16	25–23	25–19			75–58	
May 23	17:00	PCG	0–3	PHI	20–25	18–25	13–25			51–75	
May 26	13:00	STE	3–0	PCG	25–23	25–8	25–21			75–52	
May 26	15:00	ESY	0–3	PLD	12–25	17–25	18–25			47–75	
May 26	17:00	ANM	3–2	PNV	25–19	28–26	21–25	19–25	15–11	108–106	
May 28	13:00	IEM	2–3	PAR	25–15	24–26	25–20	25–27	13–15	112–103	
May 28	15:00	PHI	3–2	PNV	23–25	26–24	25–15	21–25	15–13	110–102	
May 28	17:00	ESY	0–3	PAF	17–25	23–25	19–25			59–75	
May 30	13:00	PAR	3–1	PCG	25–17	22–25	25–21	25–23		97–86	
May 30	15:00	STE	1–3	PLD	15–25	25–22	22–25	19–25		81–97	
May 30	17:00	CIG	3–1	PHI	25–18	25–20	20–25	25–18		95–81	
Jun 02	13:00	ESY	2–3	PAR	23–25	25–17	25–22	16–25	10–15	99–104	
Jun 02	15:00	PAF	0–3	CIG	18–25	20–25	14–25			52–75	
Jun 02	17:00	STE	0–3	ANM	23–25	18–25	22–25			63–75	
Jun 05	13:00	CIG	3–0	IEM	25–22	25–15	25–18			75–55	
Jun 05	15:00	ESY	2–3	ANM	21–25	25–27	25–22	25–20	13–15	109–109	
Jun 05	17:00	PAF	3–2	VNS	25–22	22–25	25–21	23–25	18–16	113–109	
Jun 06	13:00	IEM	3–2	ANM	17–25	22–25	25–20	25–18	15–10	104–98	
Jun 06	15:00	PAF	3–1	PCG	25–15	24–26	25–18	25–19		99–78	
Jun 06	15:00	PHI	3–0	PAR	25–12	25–20	25–8			75–40	P–4
Jun 09	13:00	VNS	3–1	ESY	25–18	20–25	25–10	29–27		99–80	P–2
Jun 09	15:00	PLD	0–3	CIG	21–25	19–25	19–25			59–75	P–2
Jun 09	17:00	STE	1–3	PNV	22–25	11–25	25–20	25–23		83–93	P–2
Jun 11	13:00	PCG	2–3	ANM	29–27	21–25	22–25	25–18	8–15	105–110	P–2
Jun 11	15:00	ESY	1–3	STE	26–28	21–25	25–21	21–25		93–99	P–2
Jun 11	17:00	IEM	1–3	PHI	27–25	22–25	22–25	24–26		95–101	P–2
Jun 13	13:00	STE	3–2	IEM	25–16	25–22	21–25	22–25	22–20	115–108	P–2
Jun 13	15:00	VNS	3–0	PCG	25–22	25–15	25–23			75–60	P–2
Jun 13	17:00	PHI	3–0	ANM	25–23	25–14	25–16			75–53	P–2
Jun 16	13:00	ANM	1–3	PAR	25–20	25–27	21–25	19–25		90–97	P–2
Jun 16	15:00	PNV	3–1	VNS	18–25	27–25	25–21	25–14		95–85	P–2
Jun 16	17:00	PCG	1–3	PLD	20–25	26–28	25–22	19–25		90–100	P–2
Jun 18	13:00	PAR	3–2	PNV	25–19	19–25	25–21	20–25	15–12	104–102	
Jun 18	15:00	PLD	2–3	PAF	26–24	23–25	25–23	21–25	6–15	101–112	
Jun 18	17:00	VNS	0–3	CIG	21–25	17–25	17–25			55–75	P–4
Jun 20	13:00	PAF	3–1	IEM	25–21	25–16	22–25	25–19		97–81	
Jun 20	15:00	CIG	3–0	ESY	25–17	25–12	25–17			75–46	
Jun 20	17:00	STE	3–1	PHI	25–23	27–25	21–25	25–18		98–91	
Jun 23	13:00	PAR	0–3	CIG	16–25	15–25	21–25			52–75	
Jun 23	15:00	PNV	0–3	PAF	15–25	15–25	23–25			53–75	
Jun 23	17:00	VNS	0–3	PLD	22–25	18–25	20–25			60–75	
Jun 25	13:00	PAF	3–1	STE	25–22	25–22	26–28	29–27		105–99	
Jun 25	15:00	PLD	3–0	PNV	25–22	25–18	29–27			79–67	
Jun 25	17:00	PHI	3–0	ESY	25–20	25–15	25–23			75–58	
Jun 27	13:00	ANM	3–2	VNS	21–25	25–22	34–36	25–23	15–12	120–118	
Jun 27	15:00	PNV	0–3	CIG	18–25	20–25	24–26			62–76	
Jun 27	17:00	PLD	1–3	PHI	26–24	20–25	17–25	18–25		81–99	
Jun 30	13:00	PAF	3–2	ANM	25–20	25–21	23–25	21–25	16–14	110–105	
Jun 30	15:00	PAR	0–3	PLD	19–25	18–25	23–25			60–75	
Jun 30	17:00	CIG	1–3	STE	20–25	22–25	25–19	21–25		88–94	
Jul 02	13:00	ANM	0–3	CIG	21–25	16–25	17–25			54–75	
Jul 02	15:00	PCG	1–3	IEM	25–27	21–25	25–20	20–25		91–97	
Jul 02	17:00	PAF	3–2	PHI	25–23	9–25	23–25	25–23	16–14	98–110	
Jul 04	13:00	VNS	0–3	IEM	23–25	25–27	25–27			73–79	
Jul 04	15:00	PAR	0–3	STE	29–31	17–25	23–25			69–81	
Jul 04	17:00	ESY	3–2	PCG	25–23	22–25	14–25	25–18	15–11	101–102	
Jul 07	13:00	PCG	1–3	PNV	16–25	19–25	25–18	21–25		81–93	P–2
Jul 07	15:00	IEM	3–1	ESY	25–20	21–25	25–20	28–26		99–91	P–2
Jul 07	17:00	VNS	2–3	PAR	21–25	25–22	26–24	23–25	19–21	114–117	P–2

== Final round ==
- All series are best-of-three.

Semifinals
1	Cignal HD Spikers	3	2	3
5	Sta. Elena Ball Hammers	0	3	2
2	Philippine Air Force Jet Spikers	3	2	3
3	PLDT Power Hitters	2	3	0

Finals
Cignal HD Spikers	3	3	–
Philippine Air Force Jet Spikers	1	2	–
3rd place
PLDT Power Hitters	3	2	–
Sta. Elena Ball Hammers	1	3	–

=== Semifinals ===
Rank #1 vs rank #4

Date	Time		Score		Set 1	Set 2	Set 3	Set 4	Set 5	Total	Report
Jul 11	14:00	CIG	3–0	STE	31–29	25–23	25–18			81–70	P–2
Jul 14	16:00	STE	3–2	CIG	19–25	25–22	21–25	25–17	16–14	106–103	
Jul 16	14:00	CIG	3–2	STE	25–16	28–30	20–25	25–21	18–16	116–108	

Rank #2 vs rank #3

Date	Time		Score		Set 1	Set 2	Set 3	Set 4	Set 5	Total	Report
Jul 11	16:00	PAF	3–2	PLD	22–25	25–19	25–19	21–25	15–12	108–100	P–2
Jul 14	14:00	PLD	3–2	PAF	26–24	20–25	25–21	20–25	15–13	106–108	
Jul 16	16:00	PAF	3–0	PLD	25–20	25–23	25–20			75–63	

=== Finals ===
Third place

Date	Time		Score		Set 1	Set 2	Set 3	Set 4	Set 5	Total	Report
Jul 18	14:00	PLD	3–1	STE	25–22	25–22	30–32	25–18		105–94	
Jul 21	14:00	STE	3–2	PLD	25–22	25–20	20–25	18–25	15–10	103–102	P–2

Championships

} }

Date	Time		Score		Set 1	Set 2	Set 3	Set 4	Set 5	Total	Report
Jul 18	16:00	CIG	3–1	PAF	19–25	25–13	25–22	25–21		94–81	
Jul 21	16:00	PAF	2–3	CIG	24–26	25–21	25–21	23–25	7–15	104–108	P–2

2019 Reinforced Conference champions
Cignal HD Spikers
Ysrael Marasigan (c), Rex Intal, Karl Baysa, Owen Suarez, Peter Torres, Edmar Bonono, Lorenzo Capate Jr., Jude Garcia, Vince Mangulabnan, Wendel Miguel, Angelino Pertierra, Manuel Sumanguid III, John Paul Bugaoan, Marck Espejo – Head coach: Dexter Clamor

== Awards ==
Award		Player	Ref.
Most Valuable Player	Finals	Marck Espejo (Cignal)	
Most Valuable Player	Conference	Alnakran Abdilla (Air Force)	
Best Outside Spikers	1st: 2nd:	Alnakran Abdilla (Air Force); Marck Espejo (Cignal)	
Best Middle Blockers	1st: 2nd:	Berhashidin Daymil (Sta. Elena); Kim Malabunga (Air Force)	
Best Opposite Spiker		John Vic De Guzman (PLDT)	
Best Setter		Vince Mangulabnan (Cignal)	
Best Libero		Manuel Sumanguid III (Cignal)	

== Final standings ==
Rank	Team
1st place, gold medalist(s)	Cignal HD Spikers
2nd place, silver medalist(s)	Philippine Air Force Jet Spikers
3rd place, bronze medalist(s)	PLDT Power Hitters
4	Sta. Elena Ball Hammers
5	Philippine Army Troopers
6	Philippine Navy Sea Lions
7	Animo Green Blazing Spikers
8	IEM Phoenix Volley Masters
9	VNS Griffins
10	Easy Trip–Raimol
11	Philippine Coast Guard Dolphins

== Venue ==
- Paco Arena, Paco, Manila

== Broadcast partner ==
- One Sports

== See also ==
- 2019 Premier Volleyball League Reinforced Conference
