= 2016 Spikers' Turf Open Conference =

- Duration: May 28 – July 13, 2016
- Teams: 6

Results
- Champions: Philippine Air Force Air Spikers
- Runners-up: Cignal HD Spikers
- Third place: IEM Phoenix Volley Masters
- Fourth place: Sta. Elena Construction Wrecking Balls

Awards
- Conference MVP: Greg Dolor
- Finals MVP: Fauzi Ismail
- Best OH: Raymark Woo; Raymark Woo
- Best MB: Greg Dolor; Herschel Ramos
- Best OPP: Rodolfo Labrador
- Best Setter: Jessie Lopez
- Best Libero: Juvie Mangaring

Spikers' Turf Open Conference chronology
- < 2015 2017 (PVL) >

Spikers' Turf conference chronology
- < 2015 Reinforced 2016 Collegiate >

The 2016 Spikers' Turf Open Conference was the first conference of the 2016 season of Spikers' Turf and the second running of the Open Conference. The tournament began on May 28, 2016 at the Filoil Flying V Centre in San Juan with six teams competing.

== Teams ==
Abbr	Team
BFV	Bounty Fresh Soaring Griffins
CIG	Cignal HD Spikers
IEM	IEM Volley Masters
PAF	Philippine Air Force Air Spikers
PNV	Philippine Navy Sailors
STE	Sta. Elena Construction Wrecking Balls

=== Rosters ===
Bounty Fresh
No.	Name	Position
1	FLORES, Neil	
2	DAVID, JC	
3	BAGALAY, Philip Michael	
6	SARAZA, Bryan	
7	MALLAPRE, Jed	
8	ORIAN, Jethro	
10	OCAMPO, Ralph	C
11	CHUA, Jay	
12	APOSTOL, Pocholo	
13	DALIT, Mark	
16	ORTEGA, Eduardo	
17	ASIA, Geuel	
18	SARABIA, Jason	
19	FREY, Mike	
	SANTOS, Fritz Michael	HC

Cignal
No.	Name	Position
1	MONTERO, Sandy Domenick	
2	DE LA CRUZ, Jay	C
3	DIEZMO, Glacy Ralph	
4	CASTEL, Bonkomar	
6	CAPATE, Lorenzo Jr.	
7	CALASIN, Ralph	
8	MARASIGAN, Ysrael Wilson	
9	MANGULABNAN, Vincent	
10	BAROY, Andy Loyd	
11	LANSANGAN, Jeffrey	
12	WOO, Raymark	
14	RAMOS, Herschel	
16	FAYTAREN, Alexis	
18	BONONO, Edmar	
	CARINO, Michael	HC

Instituto Estetico Manila
No.	Name	Position
1	CONDE, Michael Ian	
2	PIRANTE, Peter Warren	
3	CERILLES, Reyvic	
4	RAMOS, Erickson Joseph	
5	TIMBAL, Salvador	
6	DELA CALZADA, Karl Ian	
7	CANLAS, Edan	
8	LOZADA, John Carlo	
9	JIMENEZ, Jeffrey	
10	REFUGIA, Manolo	
11	CAMPOSANO, Edward	
12	MELGAR, Rence	
14	DOLOR, Greg	
18	GATDULA, Rudy	
	BALUNAR, Ernesto	HC

Philippine Air Force
No.	Name	Position
3	PANGAN, Mark Carlo	C
4	MOJICA, Howard	
5	MALABANAN, Jeffrey	
6	JERUS, Nino	
7	LABRADOR, Rodolfo	
8	AVILA, Arvin	
9	INAUDITO, Ruben	
10	ISMAIL, Fauzi	
11	FUENTES, Reyson	
13	ABRIA, Mike	
14	DE OCAMPO, Pitrus	
15	DIMACULANGAN, Rey Carl	
17	LOPEZ, Jessie	
18	TOLENTINO, Edwin	
	VERAYO, Rhovyl	HC

Philippine Navy
No.	Name	Position
1	CACAYURAN, Alvin	C
2	PALISOC, Ruzzel	
	MACALMA, John Angelo	
	ENCISA, Renen	
	MADSAIRI, Nur Amin	
	ZAMORA, Michael	
	ROSETE, Kurl	
	SAPIDA, Wilbert Jayson	
	MEDINO, Roldan	
	PREMAYLON, Keylin Diana	
	CHUA, Jay Joseph	
	ALMARIO, Carlo	
	PLETADO, Dave John	
	SUDARIA, Michael	
	RUSIT, Edgardo	HC

Sta. Elena Construction
No.	Name	Position
1	MANDANI, Ace	
2	CAMAGANAKAN, Joven	
3	TORRES, Peter	
7	HU, Rhenze	
8	RELATA, Den	
9	HONRADE, Rocky	C
10	ABDULWAHAB, Al-Franzin	
11	MANGARING, Juvie	
12	DELA VEGA, Kevin	
13	ARBASTRO, Christian Anthony	
14	PANGLINAWAN, Berlin	
18	ONIA, Arjay	
19	FREY, Mike	
20	SARMIENTO, Jerome	
	LANIOG, Arnold	HC

== Format ==
Preliminary round

- The preliminary round was a single round-robin tournament, with each team playing one match against all other teams for a total of five matches.
- The top four teams advanced to the semifinals while the bottom two were eliminated.

Semifinals

- The semifinals featured best-of-three series.
- The match-ups were as follows:
  - SF1: #1 vs. #4
  - SF2: #2 vs. #3
- The winners advanced to the championship while the losers would play in the third-place series.

Finals

- The championship and third-place series were best-of-three series.
- The match-ups were as follows:
  - Championship: Semifinal round winners
  - Third-place series: Semifinal round losers

== Pool standing procedure ==
- First, teams are ranked by the number of matches won.
- If the number of matches won is tied, the tied teams are then ranked by match points, wherein:
  - Match won 3–0 or 3–1: 3 match points for the winner, 0 match points for the loser.
  - Match won 3–2: 2 match points for the winner, 1 match point for the loser.
- In case of any further ties, the following criteria shall be used:
  - Set ratio: the number of sets won divided by number of sets lost.
  - Point ratio: number of points scored divided by number of points allowed.
  - Head-to-head standings: any remaining tied teams are ranked based on the results of head-to-head matches involving the teams in question.

== Preliminary round ==
All preliminary round games of the conference will be held at the Filoil Flying V Centre, San Juan except matches on June 18 which will be held at the Blue Eagle Gym, Quezon City and on June 25 at the Philsports Arena, Pasig.

Pos	Team	Pld	W	L	Pts	SW	SL	SR	SPW	SPL	SPR	Qualification
1	Cignal HD Spikers	5	5	0	13	15	5	3.000	475	393	1.209	Final round
2	Philippine Air Force Air Spikers	5	4	1	12	13	4	3.250	399	353	1.130	Final round
3	IEM Volley Masters	5	3	2	9	11	9	1.222	454	462	0.983	Final round
4	Sta. Elena Wrecking Balls	5	2	3	5	7	12	0.583	427	439	0.973	Final round
5	Bounty Fresh Soaring Griffins	5	1	4	5	9	14	0.643	458	503	0.911	
6	Philippine Navy Sailors	5	0	5	1	4	15	0.267	398	461	0.863	

== Bracket ==
Semifinals
1	Cignal HD Spikers	3	3
4	Sta. Elena Construction Wrecking Balls	1	0
2	Philippine Air Force	3	3
3	Instituto Estetico Manila	1	0

Finals
1	Cignal HD Spikers	0	0
2	Philippine Air Force	3	3
3rd place
3	Instituto Estetico Manila	1	3
4	Sta. Elena Construction Wrecking Balls	3	2

== Semifinals ==
=== Rank 1 vs Rank 4 ===
Date	Time		Score		Set 1	Set 2	Set 3	Set 4	Set 5	Total	Report
29 Jun	10:00	STE	1–3	CIG	22–25	25–19	22–25	24–26		93–95	P2
2 Jul	13:00	CIG	3–0	STE	25–23	25–16	25–17			75–56	P2

=== Rank 2 vs Rank 3 ===
Date	Time		Score		Set 1	Set 2	Set 3	Set 4	Set 5	Total	Report
29 Jun	13:00	IEM	1–3	PAF	25–22	18–25	22–25	23–25		88–97	P2
2 Jul	10:00	PAF	3–0	IEM	25–15	25–21	34–32			84–68	P2

== Third place series ==
- Sta. Elena Construction won the bronze medal.

Date	Time		Score		Set 1	Set 2	Set 3	Set 4	Set 5	Total	Report
4 Jul	13:00	STE	3–1	IEM	25–17	22–25	25–22	25–19		97–83	P2
13 Jul	11:00	IEM	3–2	STE	22–25	25–22	23–25	25–20	15–13	110–105	P2

== Finals ==
Date	Time		Score		Set 1	Set 2	Set 3	Set 4	Set 5	Total	Report
4 Jul	16:00	CIG	0–3	PAF	19–25	16–25	19–25			54–75	P2
13 Jul	14:00	PAF	3–0	CIG	25–19	25–17	28–26			78–62	P2

== Awards ==
- Most valuable player (Finals)
  - Fauzi Ismail (Air Force)
- Most valuable player (Conference)
  - Greg Dolor (IEM)
- Best setter
  - Jessie Lopez (Air Force)
- Best Outside Spikers
  - Raymark Woo (Cignal)
  - Fauzi Ismail (Air Force)
- Best middle blockers
  - Greg Dolor (IEM)
  - Herschel Ramos (Cignal)
- Best opposite spiker
  - Rodolfo Labrador (Air Force)
- Best libero
  - Juvie Mangaring (Sta. Elena)
