= 2015 Spikers' Turf season =

- League: Spikers' Turf
- Sport: Volleyball
- TV partner: PTV-4

Conferences
- Open champions: PLDT Home Ultera Ultra Fast Hitters
- Open runners-up: Cagayan Valley Rising Suns
- Collegiate champions: Ateneo de Manila University
- Collegiate runners-up: National University
- Reinforced champions: Cignal HD Spikers
- Reinforced runners-up: Philippine Air Force Air Spikers

Spiker's Turf seasons
- ← 2014 (SVL) 2016 →

The 2015 Spikers' Turf season was the inaugural season of Spikers' Turf. The season ran currently with the 2015 Shakey's V-League season with it running from April 5 to December 6, 2015. The first conference of the season was the Open Conference, followed by the Collegiate Conference, and culminating with the Reinforced Conference.

In 2014, the Shakey's V-League organized a men's tournament for the 2014 Reinforced Open Conference, which paved the way for the foundation of Spikers' Turf as its own league.

== Open conference ==
The Open Conference, which started on April 5, 2015 was the inaugural conference of the Spikers' Turf.

Participating Teams

Abbr.	Team
CAG	Cagayan Valley Rising Suns
CHA	Champion Infinity Active Smashers
CIG	Cignal HD Spikers
FRB	Fourbees Cavite Patriots Total Attackers
IEM	Instituto Estetico Manila Phoenix Volley Masters
PAF	Philippine Air Force Air Men
PAR	Philippine Army Troopers
PLD	PLDT Home Ultera Ultra Fast Hitters

Preliminary

- All times are in Philippines Standard Time (UTC+08:00)

Pos	Team	Pld	W	L	Pts	SW	SL	SR	SPW	SPL	SPR	Qualification
1	Cagayan Valley Rising Suns	7	6	1	16	20	10	2.000	678	631	1.074	Semifinals
2	PLDT Home Ultera Ultra Fast Hitters	7	5	2	17	19	10	1.900	697	617	1.130	Semifinals
3	Cignal HD Spikers	7	4	3	13	16	9	1.778	613	547	1.121	Semifinals
4	Philippine Air Force Air Men	7	4	3	12	15	12	1.250	625	616	1.015	Semifinals
5	Philippine Army Troopers	7	4	3	12	15	13	1.154	623	606	1.028	
6	Champion Infinity Active Smashers	7	4	3	11	15	14	1.071	657	656	1.002	
7	Fourbees-Cavite Patriots	7	1	6	3	4	19	0.211	435	573	0.759	
8	IEM Volley Masters	7	0	7	0	4	21	0.190	544	616	0.883	

Semifinals

Pos	Team	Pld	W	L	Pts	SW	SL	SR	SPW	SPL	SPR
1	PLDT Home Ultera Ultra Fast Hitters	3	3	0	8	9	4	2.250	303	281	1.078
2	Cagayan Valley Rising Suns	3	2	1	5	7	6	1.167	307	300	1.023
3	Cignal HD Spikers	3	1	2	4	6	6	1.000	269	274	0.982
4	Philippine Air Force Air Men	3	0	3	1	3	9	0.333	279	303	0.921

Finals

- Battle for Bronze

Date	Time		Score		Set 1	Set 2	Set 3	Set 4	Set 5	Total	Report
05/31	09:00	Cignal HD Spikers	2–3	Philippine Air Force Air Men	20–25	25–21	25–16	23–25	12–15	105–102	
06/02	14:00	Philippine Air Force Air Men	3–0	Cignal HD Spikers	25–21	25–21	25–20			75–62	

- Battle for Gold

Date	Time		Score		Set 1	Set 2	Set 3	Set 4	Set 5	Total	Report
05/31	15:00	Cagayan Valley Rising Suns	1–3	PLDT Home Ultera Ultra Fast Hitters	22–25	25–21	23–25	12–25		82–96	
06/02	16:00	PLDT Home Ultera Ultra Fast Hitters	3–1	Cagayan Valley Rising Suns	25–15	25–11	23–25	30–28		103–79	

Final standings

Rank	Team
1st place, gold medalist(s)	PLDT Home Ultera Ultra Fast Hitters
2nd place, silver medalist(s)	Cagayan Valley Rising Suns
3rd place, bronze medalist(s)	Philippine Air Force Air Men
4	Cignal HD Spikers
5	Philippine Army Troopers
6	Champion Infinity Active Smashers
7	Fourbees-Cavite Patriots
8	Instituto Estetico Manila Phoenix Volley Masters

Individual awards

Award		Name
Most Valuable Player	Finals: Conference:	Mark Gil Alfafara (PLDT); Marck Espejo (CAG)
Best Outside Spikers	1st: 2nd:	Marck Espejo (CAG); John Paul Torres (PLDT)
Best Middle Blockers	1st: 2nd:	Reyson Fuentes (CIG); Peter Den Mar Torres (CAG)
Best Opposite Spiker		Mark Gil Alfafara (PLDT)
Best Setter		Jessie Lopez (PAF)
Best Libero		Erickson Joseph Ramos (CAG)

== Collegiate conference ==
The Spikers’ Turf Collegiate Conference was the 2nd conference of the Spikers' Turf which started on July 13, 2015 and ended on September 27, 2015 at the Filoil Flying V Arena in San Juan.

Participating Teams

Participating Teams
Abbr.	Group A	Abbr.	Group B
EAC	Emilio Aguinaldo College	AUN	Arellano University
FEU	Far Eastern University	ADM	Ateneo de Manila University
NCB	National College of Business and Arts	CSB	College of Saint Benilde
NUI	National University	DLD	De La Salle University – Dasmariñas
MIT	Mapúa Institute of Technology	DLS	De La Salle University – Manila
UEA	University of the East	UPM	University of the Philippines – Diliman

Preliminary
Group A

Pos	Team	Pld	W	L	Pts	SW	SL	SR	SPW	SPL	SPR	Qualification
1	NU Bulldogs	5	5	0	14	15	2	7.500	391	352	1.111	Quarterfinals
2	EAC Generals	5	4	1	12	12	4	3.000	408	338	1.207	Quarterfinals
3	NCBA Wildcats	5	3	2	8	9	10	0.900	393	430	0.914	Quarterfinals
4	FEU Tamaraws	5	2	3	6	10	12	0.833	479	471	1.017	Quarterfinals
5	Mapúa Cardinals	5	1	4	4	6	12	0.500	389	422	0.922	
6	UE Red Warriors	5	0	5	1	3	15	0.200	357	424	0.842	

Group B

Pos	Team	Pld	W	L	Pts	SW	SL	SR	SPW	SPL	SPR	Qualification
1	Ateneo Blue Eagles	5	5	0	15	15	1	15.000	399	289	1.381	Quarterfinals
2	De La Salle Green Archers	5	4	1	11	12	6	2.000	428	389	1.100	Quarterfinals
3	UP Fighting Maroons	5	3	2	10	11	9	1.222	437	413	1.058	Quarterfinals
4	Benilde Blazers	5	1	4	3	6	12	0.500	362	406	0.892	Quarterfinals
5	Arellano Chiefs	5	1	4	3	5	13	0.385	385	425	0.906	
6	De La Salle Patriots	5	1	4	3	4	13	0.308	332	419	0.792	

Quarterfinals

Pos	Team	Pld	W	L	Pts	SW	SL	SR	SPW	SPL	SPR	Qualification
1	Ateneo Blue Eagles	7	7	0	21	21	4	5.250	621	499	1.244	Semifinals
2	NU Bulldogs	7	6	1	17	18	7	2.571	680	577	1.179	Semifinals
3	EAC Generals	7	4	3	13	15	11	1.364	630	562	1.121	Semifinals
4	NCBA Wildcats	8	4	4	10	18	17	1.059	677	706	0.959	Semifinals
5	De La Salle Green Archers	8	3	5	9	13	16	0.813	721	723	0.997	
6	UP Fighting Maroons	7	2	5	6	9	18	0.500	571	613	0.931	
7	Benilde Blazers	7	2	5	5	11	19	0.579	614	687	0.894	
8	FEU Tamaraws	7	1	6	5	10	19	0.526	617	662	0.932	

Final round

- All series are best-of-3

Semifinals
1	Ateneo Blue Eagles	3	3
4	NCBA Wildcats	0	0
2	NU Bulldogs	3	3
3	EAC Generals	2	1

Finals
1	Ateneo Blue Eagles	3	3
2	NU Bulldogs	0	1
3rd place
3	EAC Generals	3	3
4	NCBA Wildcats	0	0

Final standings

Rank	Team
1st place, gold medalist(s)	Ateneo de Manila University
2nd place, silver medalist(s)	National University
3rd place, bronze medalist(s)	Emilio Aguinaldo College
4	National College of Business and Arts
5	De La Salle University – Manila
6	University of the Philippines – Diliman
7	College of Saint Benilde
8	Far Eastern University
9	Mapúa Institute of Technology
10	Arellano University
11	De La Salle University – Dasmariñas
12	University of the East

Individual awards

Award		Name
Most Valuable Player	Finals: Conference:	Marck Espejo
Best Outside Spikers	1st: 2nd:	Howard Mojica; Marck Espejo
Best Middle Blockers	1st: 2nd:	Kim Malabunga; Reyson Fuentes
Best Opposite Spiker		Ysay Marasigan
Best Setter		April Jhon Pagtalunan
Best Libero		Ricky Marcos

Notable records

- Howard Mojica of the EAC Generals holds the record of highest number of scored points in a single game, 41 points (38 spikes, 1 block & 2 service aces) in a match against the Ateneo Blue Eagles during the quarter finals round of the 2015 collegiate conference - ref. Match 34 P2
- The Ateneo Blue Eagles made history in the league by being the first team to sweep a conference (13 wins & 0 loss).

== Reinforced conference ==
The Spikers’ Turf Reinforced Open Conference was the 3rd conference of the Spikers' Turf that started on October 10, 2015 at the Filoil Flying V Arena in San Juan.

Participating Teams

Abbr.	Team
CIG	Cignal HD Spikers
IEM	IEM Volley Masters
PAF	Philippine Air Force Air Men
PNV	Philippine Navy Sailors
PLD	PLDT Home Ultera Ultra Fast Hitters
STE (ACT)	Sta. Elena Construction Wrecking Balls

Preliminary

Pos	Team	Pld	W	L	Pts	SW	SL	SR	SPW	SPL	SPR	Qualification
1	Philippine Air Force Air Men	5	4	1	12	13	5	2.600	427	398	1.073	Semifinals
2	Cignal HD Spikers	5	4	1	11	13	7	1.857	465	411	1.131	Semifinals
3	PLDT Home Ultera Ultra Fast Hitters	5	3	2	9	10	8	1.250	428	388	1.103	Semifinals
4	Philippine Navy Sailors	5	2	3	5	7	12	0.583	410	446	0.919	Semifinals
5	IEM Volley Masters	5	1	4	4	8	12	0.667	431	468	0.921	
6	Sta. Elena Construction Wrecking Balls	5	1	4	4	6	13	0.462	403	453	0.890	

Final round

Semifinals #1 & #2 have twice-to-beat advantage
1	Philippine Air Force Air Men	3	–	–
4	Philippine Navy Sailors	2	–	–
2	Cignal HD Spikers	3	–	–
3	PLDT Home Ultera Ultra Fast Hitters	2	–	–

Finals; Best-of-three series
1	Philippine Air Force Air Men	3	0	0
2	Cignal HD Spikers	1	3	3
3rd place
3	PLDT Home Ultera Ultra Fast Hitters	3	3	–
4	Philippine Navy Sailors	1	0	–

Final standings

Rank	Team
1st place, gold medalist(s)	Cignal HD Spikers
2nd place, silver medalist(s)	Philippine Air Force Air Men
3rd place, bronze medalist(s)	PLDT Home Ultera Ultra Fast Hitters
4	Philippine Navy Sailors
5	IEM Volley Masters
6	Sta. Elena Construction Wrecking Balls

Individual awards

Award		Name
Most Valuable Player	Finals: Conference:	Edward Ybañez (Cignal); Mark Gil Alfafara (PLDT)
Best Outside Spikers	1st: 2nd:	Mark Gil Alfafara (PLDT); Nur Amid Madsairi (Navy)
Best Middle Blockers	1st: 2nd:	Peter Den Mar Torres (PLDT); Reyson Fuentes (Air Force)
Best Opposite Spiker		Reuben Inaudito (Air Force)
Best Setter		Glacy Ralph Diezmo (Cignal)
Best Libero		Sandy Montero (Cignal)

== Venue ==
- Filoil Flying V Centre, San Juan City

== Broadcast partner ==
- PTV-4

== See also ==
- 2015 SVL season
