= 2016 Spikers' Turf season =

- League: Spikers' Turf
- Sport: Volleyball
- Duration: May 26 – November 12, 2016

Conferences
- Open champions: Philippine Air Force
- Open runners-up: Cignal
- Collegiate champions: Ateneo de Manila University
- Collegiate runners-up: National University
- Reinforced champions: Philippine Air Force Air Spikers
- Reinforced runners-up: Cignal

Spiker's Turf seasons
- ← 2015 2017 (PVL) →

The 2016 Spikers' Turf season was the second season of Spikers' Turf. The season ran concurrently with the 2016 Shakey's V-League season, from May 26 to November 12, 2016. The conference order was the same as in the previous season, with first conference of the season being the Open Conference, followed by the Collegiate Conference, and culminating with the Reinforced Conference.

After this season, the Shakey's V-League rebranded to the Premier Volleyball League, and Spikers' Turf was integrated into the PVL as its men's division.

== Open conference ==
The Spikers’ Turf Collegiate Conference was the 5th conference of the Spikers' Turf, and commenced on May 28, 2016 at the Filoil Flying V Centre, San Juan. Six volleyball clubs competed in this year's Open Conference.

=== Participating teams ===
Abbr.	Team
BFV	Bounty Fresh
CIG	Cignal HD Spikers
IEM	Instituto Estetico Manila Phoenix Volley Masters
PAF	Philippine Air Force Air Spikers
PNV	Philippine Navy Sailors
STE	Sta. Elena Construction Wrecking Balls

=== Preliminary round ===
- All times are in Philippines Standard Time (UTC+08:00)

Pos	Team	Pld	W	L	Pts	SW	SL	SR	SPW	SPL	SPR	Qualification
1	Cignal HD Spikers	5	5	0	13	15	5	3.000	475	393	1.209	Semifinals
2	Philippine Air Force Air Spikers	5	4	1	12	13	4	3.250	399	353	1.130	Semifinals
3	IEM Volley Masters	5	3	2	9	11	9	1.222	454	462	0.983	Semifinals
4	Sta. Elena Construction Wrecking Balls	5	2	3	5	7	12	0.583	427	439	0.973	Semifinals
5	Bounty Fresh	5	1	4	5	9	14	0.643	458	503	0.911	
6	Philippine Navy Sailors	5	0	5	1	4	15	0.267	398	461	0.863	

=== Final round ===
Semifinals
1	Cignal HD Spikers	3	3
4	Sta. Elena Construction	1	0
2	Philippine Air Force Air Spikers	3	3
3	Instituto Estetico Manila	1	0

Finals
1	Cignal HD Spikers	0	0
2	Philippine Air Force Air Spikers	3	3
3rd place
3	Instituto Estetico Manila	1	3
4	Sta. Elena Construction	3	2

Final standings

Rank	Team
1st place, gold medalist(s)	Philippine Air Force Air Spikers
2nd place, silver medalist(s)	Cignal HD Spikers
3rd place, bronze medalist(s)	Sta. Elena Construction Wrecking Balls
4	Instituto Estetico Manila Phoenix Volley Masters
5	Bounty Fresh
6	Philippine Navy Sailors

Individual awards

Award		Name
Most Valuable Player	Finals: Conference:	Fauzi Ismail (Air Force); Greg Dolor (IEM)
Best Outside Spikers	1st: 2nd:	Raymark Woo (Cignal); Fauzi Ismail (Air Force)
Best Middle Blockers	1st: 2nd:	Greg Dolor (IEM); Herschel Ramos (Cignal)
Best Opposite Spiker		Rodolfo Labrador (Air Force)
Best Setter		Jessie Lopez (Air Force)
Best Libero		Juvie Mangaring (Sta. Elena)

== Collegiate conference ==
The Spikers’ Turf Collegiate Conference was the 5th conference of the league. It started on July 30, 2016 and ended on September 10, 2016. Games were held at the Ynares Sports Arena and PhilSports Arena. There were twelve competing teams in this conference.

=== Participating teams ===
Participating teams
Abbr.	Group A	Abbr.	Group B
CSB	College of Saint Benilde	ADM	Ateneo de Manila University
DLS	De La Salle University – Manila	EAC	Emilio Aguinaldo College
FEU	Far Eastern University	NCB	National College of Business and Arts
NUI	National University	SBC	San Beda College
UPH	University of Perpetual Help System DALTA	UPD	University of the Philippines – Diliman
PMM	Philippine Merchant Marine School	UST	University of Santo Tomas

=== Preliminary round ===
Group A

Pos	Team	Pld	W	L	Pts	SW	SL	SR	SPW	SPL	SPR	Qualification
1	NU Bulldogs	5	4	1	12	13	4	3.250	414	354	1.169	Semifinals
2	De La Salle Green Archers	5	4	1	12	14	7	2.000	470	449	1.047	Semifinals
3	FEU Tamaraws	5	3	2	10	11	8	1.375	444	404	1.099	
4	Perpetual Altas	5	3	2	7	10	10	1.000	419	428	0.979	
5	Benilde Blazers	5	1	4	4	8	12	0.667	438	469	0.934	
6	Philippine Merchant Marine School	5	0	5	0	0	15	0.000	305	386	0.790	

Qualified to the semifinals

Group B

Pos	Team	Pld	W	L	Pts	SW	SL	SR	SPW	SPL	SPR	Qualification
1	Ateneo Blue Eagles	5	5	0	15	15	1	15.000	404	311	1.299	Semifinals
2	UST Growling Tigers	5	4	1	10	12	7	1.714	426	389	1.095	Semifinals
3	UP Fighting Maroons	5	3	2	9	11	9	1.222	447	432	1.035	
4	NCBA Wildcats	5	2	3	7	8	11	0.727	427	463	0.922	
5	San Beda Red Lions	5	1	4	3	6	14	0.429	425	483	0.880	
6	EAC Generals	5	0	5	1	5	15	0.333	431	482	0.894	

=== Final round ===
- All series are best-of-3

Semifinals
A1	NU Bulldogs	3	3
B2	UST Growling Tigers	0	0
B1	Ateneo Blue Eagles	3	3
A2	De La Salle Green Archers	2	0

Finals
Ateneo Blue Eagles	3	3
NU Bulldogs	2	1
3rd place
UST Growling Tigers	3	1
De La Salle Green Archers	0	3

Final standings

Rank	Team
1st place, gold medalist(s)	Ateneo Blue Eagles
2nd place, silver medalist(s)	NU Bulldogs
3rd place, bronze medalist(s)	UST Growling Tigers
4	De La Salle Green Archers
5	FEU Tamaraws
6	UP Fighting Maroons
7	Perpetual Altas
8	NCBA Wildcats
9	Benilde Blazers
10	San Beda Red Lions
11	EAC Generals
12	Philippine Merchant Marine School

Individual awards

Award		Name
Most Valuable Player	Finals: Conference:	Antony Paul Koyfman; Marck Espejo
Best Outside Spikers	1st: 2nd:	Marck Espejo; Raymark Woo
Best Middle Blockers	1st: 2nd:	Rafael del Pilar; Kim Malabunga
Best Opposite Spiker		Madzlan Gampong
Best Setter		Esmilzo Joner Polvoroza
Best Libero		Lester Kim Sawal

== Reinforced conference ==
The Spikers’ Turf Reinforced Conference was the 6th conference of the Spikers' Turf. It started on October 1, 2016 and ended on November 12, 2016. Games were held at the PhilSports Arena in Pasig. There were six competing teams in this conference.

=== Participating teams ===
Abbr.	Team
100	100 Plus Active Spikers
CHM	Champion Supra
CIG	Cignal HD Spikers
IEM	IEM Volley Masters
PAF	Philippine Air Force Air Spikers
PAR	Philippine Army Troopers

=== Preliminary round ===
Pos	Team	Pld	W	L	Pts	SW	SL	SR	SPW	SPL	SPR	Qualification
1	Philippine Air Force Air Spikers	5	4	1	12	13	5	2.600	436	392	1.112	Semifinals
2	Cignal HD Spikers	5	4	1	10	13	7	1.857	468	416	1.125	Semifinals
3	Champion Supra	5	3	2	11	13	8	1.625	495	455	1.088	Semifinals
4	Instituto Estetico Manila	5	3	2	7	10	10	1.000	426	443	0.962	Semifinals
5	Philippine Army Troopers	5	3	2	7	9	11	0.818	422	459	0.919	
6	100 Plus Active Spikers	5	0	5	0	2	15	0.133	337	419	0.804	

=== Final round ===
- All series are best-of-3

Semifinals
1	Philippine Air Force Air Spikers	3	3
4	Instituto Estetico Manila	1	1
2	Cignal HD Spikers	3	3
3	Champion Supra	2	0

Finals
Philippine Air Force Air Spikers	3	3
Cignal HD Spikers	2	1
3rd place
Champion Supra	3	3
Instituto Estetico Manila	1	2

Final standings

Rank	Team
1st place, gold medalist(s)	Philippine Air Force Air Spikers
2nd place, silver medalist(s)	Cignal HD Spikers
3rd place, bronze medalist(s)	Champion Supra
4	Instituto Estetico Manila
5	Philippine Army Troopers
6	100 Plus Active Spikers

Individual awards

Award		Name
Most Valuable Player	Finals: Conference:	Bryan Bagunas (Air Force); Howard Mojica (Air Force)
Best Outside Spikers	1st: 2nd:	Howard Mojica (Air Force); Lorenzo Capate Jr. (Cignal)
Best Middle Blockers	1st: 2nd:	Kheeno Franco (IEM); Peter Torres (Cignal)
Best Opposite Spiker		Berlin Paglinawan (Champion)
Best Setter		Jessie Lopez (Air Force)
Best Libero		Sandy Montero (Cignal)

== All-star game ==
On November 20, 2016, Sports Vision launched an all-star game for both Spikers' Turf and Shakey's V-League. For the men's league, it featured two teams (Team Hataw and Team Galaw), composed of notable players from various club or collegiate teams.

=== Teams ===
Team	Outside hitters	Middle blockers	Opposite spikers	Setters	Liberos
Team Galaw	Reymark Woo (La Salle); Howard Mojica (Air Force); Marck Espejo (Cignal)	Rex Intal (Cignal); Greg Dolor (IEM); Peter Torres (Cignal)	Rodolfo Labrador (Air Force); Ysay Marasigan (c) (Cignal); Tony Koyfman (Ateneo)	Ish Polvorosa (Cignal); Geuel Asia (La Salle)	Jason Uy (Army)
Team Hataw	Mark Alfafara (Air Force); Fauzi Esmail (NU); Bryan Bagunas (NU); Berlin Paglinawan (Champion)	Jeffrey Malabanan (AIr Force); Reyson Fuentes (Air Force); Kheeno Franco (IEM)	Patrick Rojas (Air Force); Edward Ybañez (Cignal)	Vince Mangulabnan (Cignal); Jessie Lopez (c) (Air Force)	Louie Chavez (Air Force)

=== Match results ===
Date	Time		Score		Set 1	Set 2	Set 3	Set 4	Set 5	Total	Report
20 Nov	15:30	Team Galaw	3–1	Team Galaw	25–21	25–23	18–25	25–20		93–89	P-2

== Venues ==
- Filoil Flying V Centre, San Juan
- Ynares Sports Arena, Pasig
- PhilSports Arena, Pasig

== See also ==
- 2016 SVL season
