= Ricky Marcos =

Filipino volleyball player (born 1996)

Personal information
- Nationality: Filipino
- Born: August 1, 1996 (age 30)
- Height: 1.67 m (5 ft 6 in)
- Education: National University

Volleyball information
- Position: Libero
- Current club: Imus City–AJAA Spikers
- Number: 2

Career
| Years | Teams |
|---|---|
| 2017 | Megabuilders Volley Bolts |
| 2018 | Philippine Air Force |
| 2018–2019 | Sta. Elena–NU |
| 2021 | Philippine Air Force |
| 2022–present | Imus City–AJAA Spikers |

National team
| 2019–present | Philippines |
Honours
Men's volleyball
Representing Philippines
Southeast Asian Games
| Silver medal – second place | 2019 Manila | Team |
ASEAN University Games
| Gold medal – first place | 2018 Naypyidaw | Team |

Ricky Marcos (born August 1, 1996) is a Filipino volleyball athlete. He played with NU Bulldogs collegiate men's University team. He is currently playing for the Imus City–AJAA Spikers in the Spikers' Turf.

== Clubs ==
- (Philippines) Megabuilders Volley Bolts (2017)
- (Philippines) Philippine Air Force Air Spikers (2018, 2021)
- (Philippines) Sta. Elena NU-Ball Hammers (2018 - 2019)
- (Philippines) Imus City–AJAA Spikers (2022 - present)

== Awards ==
=== Individual ===
| Year | League | Season/Conference | Award | Ref |
|---|---|---|---|---|
| 2015 | NCAA (Junior's) | 90 | MVP (Finals) | |
| 2015 | Spikers' Turf | Collegiate | Best Libero | |
| 2016 | UAAP | 78 | Best Digger | |
| 2017 | UAAP | 79 | Best Digger | |
| 2018 | PVL | Collegiate | Best Libero | |
| 2018 | PVL | Open | Best Libero | |
| 2021 | PNVF | Champions League | Best Libero | |
| 2022 | Spikers' Turf | Open | Best Libero | |

=== Collegiate ===
==== NU Bulldogs ====
| Year | League | Season/Conference | Title | Ref |
|---|---|---|---|---|
| 2015 | Spikers' Turf | Collegiate | Runner-up | |
| 2016 | UAAP | 78 | Runner-up | |
| 2016 | Spikers' Turf | Collegiate | Runner-up | |
| 2017 | UAAP | 79 | Runner-up | |
| 2018 | UAAP | 80 | Champions | |
| 2018 | PVL | Collegiate | Champions | |
| 2019 | UAAP | 81 | Champions | |

=== Clubs ===
| Year | League | Season/Conference | Club | Title | Ref |
|---|---|---|---|---|---|
| 2019 | Spikers' Turf | Open | Sta. Elena-NU Ball Hammers | 3rd place | |
| 2021 | PNVF | Champions League | Go for Gold-Air Force Aguilas | Runner-up | |
| 2022 | PNVF | Champions League | Imus City-AJAA Spikers | 3rd place | |
| 2023 | Spikers' Turf | Open | Imus City-AJAA Spikers | 3rd place | |
