= Pitrus de Ocampo =

Filipino volleyball player (born 1991)

Pitrus De Ocampo

Personal information
- Full name: Pitrus Paolo De Ocampo
- Nationality: Filipino
- Born: June 29, 1991 (age 35)
- Height: 1.78 m (5 ft 10 in)
- Education: Far Eastern University

Volleyball information
- Position: Setter
- Current club: Philippine Air Force Air Spikers
- Number: 19

Pitrus Paolo De Ocampo (born June 29, 1991) is a Filipino volleyball player. He played with FEU Tamaraws men's collegiate volleyball team. He last played for the Philippine Air Force Air Spikers in the Spikers' Turf.

== Career ==
=== Collegiate ===
De Ocampo played for FEU Tamaraws in the UAAP as a setter.

In UAAP Season 71, they failed to advanced in the Semis after being placed in 6th.

In UAAP Season 72, they got a 11–3 win-loss record in the preliminary round. They succeeded to advanced in the finals after defeating the Ateneo Blue Eagles in the Semis but they failed to get the championship title after being defeated by UST Golden Spikers in the finals.

In UAAP Season 73, they got a 13–1 win-loss record in the preliminary round tied with UST Golden Spikers. They succeeded to advanced in the finals after defeating the UP Fighting Maroons in the Semis but they failed to get the championship title after being defeated by UST Golden Spikers in Game 2 of the best-of-three finals series.

In UAAP Season 74, they got 12–2 win-loss record in the preliminary round. They won against De La Salle Green Archers in the Semis. They hailed as UAAP Season 74 champions after they won against UST Golden Spikers in Game 2 of the best-of-three finals series.

In UAAP Season 75, De Ocampo played his last playing year in UAAP. He didn't finish the season because of the injury.

== Clubs ==
- (Philippines) Gilingan's Sisig Kings (2013)
- (Philippines) Philippine Air Force Air Spikers (2015–2024)

== Awards ==
=== Clubs ===
Year	League	Season/Conference	Club	Title	Ref					
Year	League	Season/Conference	Club	Title	Ref	2015	Spikers' Turf	Reinforced	Philippine Air Force Air Spikers	Runner-up
2016	Open	Champions					Spikers' Turf		Philippine Air Force Air Spikers	
2016	Reinforced	Champions					Spikers' Turf		Philippine Air Force Air Spikers	
2017	PVL	Reinforced	Runner-up						Philippine Air Force Air Spikers	
2017	PVL	Open	3rd place						Philippine Air Force Air Spikers	
2018	PVL	Reinforced	Champions						Philippine Air Force Air Spikers	
2018	Spikers' Turf	Open	Champions						Philippine Air Force Air Spikers	
2019	Spikers' Turf	Reinforced	Runner-up						Philippine Air Force Air Spikers	
2019	Spikers' Turf	Open	Runner-up						Philippine Air Force Air Spikers	
2021	PNVF	Champions League	Runner-up						Philippine Air Force Air Spikers	
