= Ranran Abdilla =

Filipino volleyball player (born 1992)

Alnakran Abdilla

Personal information
- Nickname: Ranran
- Nationality: Filipino
- Born: April 22, 1992 (age 34)
- Hometown: Bongao, Tawi-Tawi, Philippines
- Height: 1.92 m (6 ft 4 in)
- Education: De La Salle University-Dasmariñas

Volleyball information
- Position: Outside Hitter
- Current club: Philippine Air Force Air Spikers
- Number: 11

Career
Years	Teams
2014	PLDT Home TVolution Power Attackers
2015–present	Philippine Air Force Air Spikers

National team
2014–present	Philippines
Honours
Men's indoor and beach volleyball
Representing Philippines
Southeast Asian Games
Silver medal – second place	2019 Manila	Indoor
Bronze medal – third place	2021 Quang Ninh	Beach
Bronze medal – third place	2023 Sihanoukville	Beach

Alnakran Abdilla (born April 22, 1992) is a Filipino indoor and beach volleyball player who last played as an outside hitter for the Philippine Air Force Air Spikers in Spikers' Turf. During his collegiate years, he played for the De La Salle University – Dasmariñas men's volleyball team.

== Personal life ==
Abdilla graduated with a degree in Criminology at De La Salle University – Dasmariñas.

== Career ==
Abdilla played for DLSU-Damariñas and helped the team win different collegiate leagues.

In 2014, he played for the PLDT Home TVolution Power Attackers where they placed in third.

In 2015, he transferred Philippine Air Force Air Spikers and helped the team win titles in the Spikers' Turf.

In 2019, Abdilla became part of the Philippines men's national volleyball team and represented the Philippines at the 2019 Southeast Asian Games, winning silver.

== Clubs ==
- (Philippines) PLDT Home TVolution Power Attackers (2014)
- (Philippines) Philippine Air Force Air Spikers (2015–present)

== Awards ==
=== Individual ===
Year	League	Season/Conference	Award	Ref
2014	PSL	All Filipino	MVP (Conference)	
2014	PSL	All Filipino	1st Best Outside Spiker	
2014	PSL	Grand Prix	1st Best Outside Spiker	
2017	PVL	Reinforced	MVP (Conference)	
2018	PVL	Reinforced	1st Best Outside Spiker	
2018	PVL	Reinforced	MVP (Finals)	
2019	Spikers' Turf	Reinforced	1st Best Outside Spiker	
2019	Spikers' Turf	Reinforced	MVP (Conference)	
2019	Spikers' Turf	Open	1st Best Outside Spiker	

=== Clubs ===
Year	League	Season/Conference	Club	Title	Ref
2014	PSL	All-Filipino	PLDT Home TVolution Power Attackers	Champion	
2014	PSL	Grand Prix	PLDT Home TVolution Power Attackers	Runner-up	
2015	Spikers' Turf	Reinforced	Philippine Air Force Air Spikers	Runner-up	
2016	Spikers' Turf	Open	Philippine Air Force Air Spikers	Champions	
2016	Spikers' Turf	Reinforced	Philippine Air Force Air Spikers	Champions	
2017	PVL	Reinforced	Philippine Air Force Air Spikers	Runner-up	
2017	PVL	Open	Philippine Air Force Air Spikers	3rd place	
2018	PVL	Reinforced	Philippine Air Force Air Spikers	Champions	
2018	Spikers' Turf	Open	Philippine Air Force Air Spikers	Champions	
2019	Spikers' Turf	Reinforced	Philippine Air Force Air Spikers	Runner-up	
2019	Spikers' Turf	Open	Philippine Air Force Air Spikers	Runner-up	
2021	PNVF	Champions League	Philippine Air Force Air Spikers	Runner-up	

=== International recognitions ===
Year	Tournament	Volleyball type	Title	Ref
2019	SEA Games	Indoor	Runner-up	
2021	SEA Games	Beach	3rd place	
2023	SEA Games	Beach	3rd place	
