= 2018 Premier Volleyball League Collegiate Conference – Men's division =

Second men's tournament of the 2018 PVL season

2018 Premier Volleyball League Collegiate Conference
- Duration: July 21 – September 12, 2018
- Teams: 10
- TV partner(s): S+A; Liga

Results
- Champions: NU Bulldogs
- Runners-up: UST Growling Tigers
- Third place: FEU Tamaraws
- Fourth place: Adamson Soaring Falcons

Awards
- Conference MVP: Paolo Pablico
- Finals MVP: Bryan Bagunas
- Best OH: Bryan Bagunas; Paolo Pablico
- Best MB: John Paul Bugaoan; Jayvee Sumagaysay
- Best OPP: Joshua Umandal
- Best Setter: Timothy Tajanlangit
- Best Libero: Ricky Marcos

PVL Collegiate Conference chronology
- < 2017

PVL conference chronology
- < 2018 Reinforced 2018 Open (ST) >

The men's division of the 2018 Premier Volleyball League Collegiate Conference was the second conference of the 2018 Premier Volleyball League men's division season. The conference started on July 21, 2018 and ended on September 12, 2018 at the Filoil Flying V Centre, San Juan, Metro Manila.

This was the last conference in which the PVL held a men's division, as beginning with the 2018 Open Conference, all men's teams competed in the returning Spikers' Turf with a separate running of the Open Conference.

== Teams ==
2018 Premier Volleyball League Collegiate Conference (Men's Division)
Abbr.	Team	Head coach	Team captain
ADU	Adamson Soaring Falcons	Domingo Custodio	Paolo Pablico
AUN	Arellano Chiefs	Sherwin Meneses	Christian Joshua Segovia
CSB	Benilde Blazers	Arnold Laniog	Francis Basilan
DLS	De La Salle Green Archers	Norman Miguel	Chris Bernard Dumago
FEU	FEU Tamaraws	Reynaldo Diaz Jr.	Redijohn Paler
NUI	NU Bulldogs	Dante Alinsunurin	Francis Saura
SBU	San Beda Red Lions	Ernesto Pamilar	Angelo Michael Torres
UPH	Perpetual Help Altas	Sinfronio Acaylar	John Patrick Ramos
UPD	UP Fighting Maroons	Hans Chuacuco	Jerry San Pedro Jr.
UST	UST Growling Tigers	Arthur Alan Mamon	Timothy James Tajanlangit

Legend
G	Guest Player
S	Setter
MH	Middle Hitter
OH	Outside Hitter
OP	Opposite Hitter
L	Libero
(c)	Team captain
HC	Head coach

Line-up

Adamson Soaring Falcons
No.	Name	Position
1	AMBURGO, Lenard Franz	S
3	MIRANDA, Leo	OH
4	BELLO, Royce	MB
5	LACERNA, Denzel John	
6	JIMENEZ, Carlo	S
7	GUDOY, Jadewin	OH
8	PABLICO, Paolo (c)	MB
9	VALDEZ, Jesus	
10	ALVAREZ, Mark	MB
11	NUGUID, John Phillip	L
12	PINAR, Kapen	
13	LABANG, George	
14	ALICANDO, Geoffrey	
15	FLORENDO, Kevin	L
	CUSTODIO, Domingo	HC

Arellano Chiefs
No.	Name	Position
3	LAPUZ, Demy Freedom M.	
4	DOMINGO, Roi C.	
5	MENESES, Edmark F.	S
6	VILLADOS, Adrian	MB
7	ARELLANO, Tonnel L.	
8	CABILLAN, John Joseph R.	
9	SEGOVIA, Christian Joshua A. (c)	MB
10	ESGUERRA, Joshua C.	L
13	TAN, Kim	
14	CACCAM, Junnel P.	
15	DELA PAZ, Christian B.	OP
16	DABLO, Zachaery	L
17	LIBERATO, Jesrael C.	
18	RINON, Evo	
	MENESES, Sherwin	HC

Benilde Blazers
No.	Name	Position
1	MAGSINO, Kevin	S
2	ADVIENTO, Roniey	OH
3	ALMONTE, Franz Emile	OH
4	UGALDE, Renald Ian	
5	MONTANO, Josh Renen	OH
6	BAUTISTA, Anthony	
7	BACANI, Owen	
9	DY, Aljian Paul	L
10	ROJAS, Rod Tyron	
11	ABBOT, Ruvince	
13	DUMARAN, Bryan	L
14	BASILAN, Francis (c)	MB
15	SAN MIGUEL, Jerico	
19	DE SEQUERA, Jerico	
	LANIOG, Arnold	HC

De La Salle Green Archers
No.	Name	Position
1	REYES, Keiffer	MB
2	MACASPAC, Rafael	L
3	SUMALINOG, Raphael	L
4	BACON, Geriant Bell	
5	DE LOS REYES, John David	MB
6	INOCENTES, John David	OH
7	DUMAGO, Cris Bernard (c)	OP
8	AQUINO, Ashberry John	OH
9	MARCO, Wayne Ferdi	S
11	SERRANO, Angel Paul	MB
12	LLIGE, Rhian Ozzie	
14	BALANOG, Gibson	
15	MARAVILLA, Zosimo	OH
16	DE JESUS, Gian	
	MIGUEL, Norman	HC

FEU Tamaraws
No.	Name	Position
1	BARRICA, Jeremiah	L
3	SILANG, Kris Cian	S
4	SUAREZ, Owen Jaime	S
5	DE ASIS, Reco	
6	CALADO, Mark	OH
8	BUGAOAN, John Paul	MB
9	LORENZO, Vince Patrick	
10	PALER, Redijohn (c)	OH
12	SALBSAB, John Paul	OH
14	BAUTISTA, Raymond	
15	QUIEL, Peter John	OH
16	JUNGCO, San Lerry	
18	LAGANINA, Eugene	
19	FERNANDEZ, Clark	
	DIAZ, Reynaldo Jr.	HC

NU Bulldogs
No.	Name	Position
1	BAGUNAS, Bryan	OH
2	ANCHETA, Jann Paulo	OH
3	DAYANDANTE, Kim Harold	S
5	PONTI, Krisvan	OH
6	MONDERO, Banjo	OH
7	ALMENDREZ, Anjo Nicolas	OH
8	SUMAGUI, Jann Mariano	L
9	NATIVIDAD, James Martin	OH
12	SAURA, Francis Philip (c)	MB
14	DAYMIL, Berhashidin	MB
15	MARCOS, Ricky	L
16	RETAMAR, Ave Joshua	OP
17	MALABUNGA, Kim Niño	MB
18	GAMPONG, Madzlan	OP
	ALINSUNURIN, Dante	HC

San Beda Red Lions
No.	Name	Position
2	MUALLIL, Edzilin	
3	TORRES, Angelo Michael (c)	MB
5	DAQUIL, Johnrey	
6	LAPURGA, Melver	
7	AMAGAN, Jomaru	OH
9	ULIBAS, Ferdinand	
10	ESTAVILLO, Lester	
11	TIBAY, Jeremiah	L
12	PALATTAO, Patrick	
13	LOSA, Jeffrey	
14	NURSIDDIK, Adburasad	MB
15	NUGUID, Marvin Lee	S
16	ROJAS, Bruce	
18	DECANO, Mark Joel	
	PAMILAR, Ernesto "Nes"	HC

Perpetual Help Altas
No.	Name	Position
1	ISIDRO, Carlo	L
2	MUHALI, Ridzuan J.	
3	KASIM, Ismail	OH
4	ATENTAR, Jeric J.	
5	CASANA, Gabriel EJ	S
6	ROSOS, Khyl Raven	
7	RAMIREZ, Louie	
8	BAGAYAN, John-Rick	
9	ENARCISO, John Christian	
10	GO, Ryan	L
11	BATION, James Mark M.	
12	RAMOS, John Patrick (c)	
13	ROSALES, Ronnel C.	
16	ALMODIEL, Joe Bert S.	OH
	ACAYLAR, Sinfronio "Sammy"	HC

UP Fighting Maroons
No.	Name	Position
1	BALDELOVAR, Jarahmeel	S
2	ENTERIA, Bryan	
3	CONSUELO, Nicolo	
4	CASTILLO, John Mark Joshua	MB
6	SAN PEDRO, Jerry Earl Jr. (c)	OH
7	NASOL, John Miguel	L
8	FORTES, Joshua Emmanuel	OH
11	MEMBREVE, Vincent	
12	MILLETE, John Mark	OP
13	IJIRAN, Ruskin Joss	
14	YAN, Martin David	
15	CUEVAS, JC	
17	GOHOC, Matthew	MB
18	SAN PASCUAL, Gian Kyle	MB
	CHUACUCO, Hans	HC

UST Growling Tigers
No.	Name	Position
1	SAWAL, Lester Kim Sawal	L
2	VALENZUELA, Vyxen Vaughn	OH
3	TAJANLANGIT, Jerald David	OH
4	ESCOBAR, Ithan	
6	CASILAN, Aldous Darcy	S
7	SUMAGAYSAY, Jayvee	MB
8	REDIDO, Genesis	
9	TAJANLANGIT, Timothy James (c)	S
10	MEDINA, Manuel Andrei	OH
11	UMANDAL, Joshua	OP
12	CORDA, Hermel Gem	
13	MENDIOLA, Jelex Jay	L
14	BURO, Juren Jireh	OH
16	CARODAN, Tyrone Jan	OP
	MAMON, Arthur Alan "Odjie"	HC

== Format ==
Preliminary round

The ten teams compete in a single round-robin tournament, with each team playing one match against all other teams for a total of nine matches. The top four teams will advance to the semifinals while the bottom six will be eliminated and ranked 5th through 10th in the final standings.

Semifinals

The top four teams from the preliminary round compete in the semifinals. Teams compete in best-of-three series with the winners advancing to the finals while the losers will compete in the third place series. The match-ups for the semifinals are as follows:

- SF1: PR #1 vs. PR #4
- SF2: PR #2 vs. PR #3

Third place series

The losing teams from the semifinals compete in a best-of-three series to determine which team will finish third in this conference. If the series is tied at 1–1 when the championship is decided, the pool standing procedure will be used (starting from set ratio).

Finals

The winning teams from the semifinals compete in a best-of-three series to determine the conference champions. The losing team in this round will be declared conference runners-up.

== Pool standing procedure ==
Teams are initially ranked by wins followed by match points. A win awards three points if the match lasted for three or four sets (3–0 or 3–1), or two points if the match lasted for five sets (3–2). A loss only awards one point if the match lasted for five sets (2–3).

If multiple teams tie for wins and match points, the next criteria are set ratio (the number of sets won divided by number of sets lost across all matches) and point ratio (the number of points won divided by number of points lost across all matches). If any teams are still tied, the procedure will be applied again, but only considering matches between the remaining tied teams.

== Preliminary round ==
Pos	Team	Pld	W	L	Pts	SW	SL	SR	SPW	SPL	SPR	Qualification
1	NU Bulldogs	9	8	1	24	25	8	3.125	820	692	1.185	Semifinals
2	UST Growling Tigers	9	8	1	23	26	8	3.250	768	681	1.128	Semifinals
3	Adamson Soaring Falcons	9	6	3	19	21	13	1.615	812	761	1.067	Semifinals
4	FEU Tamaraws	9	5	4	15	19	18	1.056	791	779	1.015	Semifinals
5	Benilde Blazers	9	5	4	14	16	17	0.941	747	759	0.984	Fourth-seed playoff
6	UP Fighting Maroons	9	4	5	13	19	18	1.056	824	827	0.996	
7	Perpetual Help Altas	9	4	5	11	14	20	0.700	737	796	0.926	
8	De La Salle Green Archers	9	2	7	8	14	22	0.636	758	836	0.907	
9	San Beda Red Lions	9	2	7	5	10	24	0.417	743	819	0.907	
10	Arellano Chiefs	9	1	8	4	10	25	0.400	746	826	0.903	

Rules for classification: Point system: 3 points = win match in 3 or 4 sets; 2 points = win match in 5 sets; 1 point = lose match in 5 sets; 0 point = lose match in 3 or 4 sets

Match results

- All times are in Philippines Standard Time (UTC+08:00)

Date	Time		Score		Set 1	Set 2	Set 3	Set 4	Set 5	Total	Report
Jul 21	10:00	Arellano Chiefs	1–3	Adamson Soaring Falcons	22–25	24–26	25–22	24–26		95–99	P–2
Jul 21	12:00	De La Salle Green Archers	2–3	UP Fighting Maroons	25–23	19–25	27–25	22–25	12–15	105–113	P–2
Jul 21	18:00	FEU Tamaraws	0–3	UST Growling Tigers	19–25	13–25	20–25			52–75	P–2
Jul 22	10:00	NU Bulldogs	3–1	Perpetual Help Altas	25–18	27–25	23–25	25–16		100–84	P–2
Jul 22	12:00	San Beda Red Lions	1–3	Benilde Blazers	21–25	25–15	26–28	25–27		97–95	P–2
Jul 25	10:00	De La Salle Green Archers	1–3	Adamson Soaring Falcons	21–25	16–25	25–22	20–25		82–97	P–2
Jul 25	12:00	Benilde Blazers	0–3	NU Bulldogs	16–25	22–25	22–25			60–75	P–2
Jul 25	18:00	Perpetual Help Altas	0–3	UST Growling Tigers	17–25	21–25	11–25			49–75	P–2
Jul 28	10:00	Perpetual Help Altas	3–2	FEU Tamaraws	19–25	25–22	21–25	25–18	15–13	105–103	
Jul 28	12:00	Adamson Soaring Falcons	3–0	San Beda Red Lions	25–23	25–21	29–27			79–71	
Jul 29	10:00	UST Growling Tigers	3–2	De La Salle Green Archers	25–19	23–25	17–25	25–19	15–10	105–98	P–2
Jul 29	12:00	Arellano Chiefs	1–3	UP Fighting Maroons	22–25	21–25	25–22	19–25		87–97	P–2
Aug 02	09:00	San Beda Red Lions	3–2	UP Fighting Maroons	25–21	22–25	27–25	23–25	15–13	112–109	
Aug 02	11:00	NU Bulldogs	3–0	Arellano Chiefs	25–12	25–13	25–20			75–45	
Aug 02	18:00	De La Salle Green Archers	0–3	FEU Tamaraws	16–25	20–25	23–25			59–75	
Aug 05	10:00	Adamson Soaring Falcons	3–0	Perpetual Help Altas	25–15	25–21	25–12			75–48	P–2
Aug 05	12:00	UST Growling Tigers	3–0	Benilde Blazers	25–23	26–24	25–23			76–70	P–2
Aug 08	09:00	FEU Tamaraws	3–2	Adamson Soaring Falcons	15–25	25–19	21–25	25–23	17–15	103–107	P–2
Aug 08	11:00	San Beda Red Lions	3–1	Arellano Chiefs	25–23	22–25	25–23	25–16		97–87	P–2
Aug 08	13:00	NU Bulldogs	3–1	UP Fighting Maroons	25–13	25–20	23–25	26–24		99–82	P–2
Aug 08	18:00	Perpetual Help Altas	1–3	Benilde Blazers	20–25	25–23	23–25	21–25		89–98	P–2
Aug 11	09:00	Arellano Chiefs	0–3	Benilde Blazers	22–25	22–25	22–25			66–75	
Aug 11	13:00	UP Fighting Maroons	3–0	Perpetual Help Altas	25–23	25–17	27–25			77–65	
Aug 11	18:00	UST Growling Tigers	3–0	Adamson Soaring Falcons	25–22	26–24	25–22			76–68	
Aug 12	10:00	De La Salle Green Archers	3–0	San Beda Red Lions	25–23	25–18	25–21			75–62	
Aug 12	12:00	FEU Tamaraws	0–3	NU Bulldogs	18–25	19–25	22–25			59–75	
Aug 15	09:00	NU Bulldogs	1–3	De La Salle Green Archers	25–27	25–27	25–17	17–25		92–96	P–2
Aug 15	11:00	FEU Tamaraws	3–1	Arellano Chiefs	22–25	25–20	25–16	25–20		97–81	P–2
Aug 15	13:00	Benilde Blazers	0–3	UP Fighting Maroons	21–25	20–25	23–25			64–75	P–2
Aug 15	18:00	San Beda Red Lions	0–3	UST Growling Tigers	24–26	20–25	22–25			66–76	
Aug 18	10:00	NU Bulldogs	3–2	Adamson Soaring Falcons	25–21	23–25	25–10	21–25	17–15	111–96	P–2
Aug 18	12:00	FEU Tamaraws	3–1	San Beda Red Lions	25–18	25–18	23–25	25–18		98–79	P–2
Aug 18	18:00	Benilde Blazers	3–1	De La Salle Green Archers	25–21	21–25	25–19	25–22		96–87	
Aug 19	09:00	Perpetual Help Altas	3–1	Arellano Chiefs	25–16	27–25	24–26	25–20		101–87	
Aug 19	11:00	UST Growling Tigers	3–1	UP Fighting Maroons	25–22	19–25	25–22	25–18		94–87	
Aug 22	08:00	Arellano Chiefs	2–3	UST Growling Tigers	19–25	21–25	25–23	25–14	8–15	98–102	
Aug 22	10:00	De La Salle Green Archers	1–3	Perpetual Help Altas	10–25	25–21	19–25	19–25		73–96	
Aug 22	12:00	FEU Tamaraws	2–3	Benilde Blazers	25–23	25–11	17–25	17–25	11–15	95–99	
Aug 22	14:00	NU Bulldogs	3–1	San Beda Red Lions	20–25	25–12	30–28	25–16		100–81	
Aug 22	18:00	Adamson Soaring Falcons	3–1	UP Fighting Maroons	17–25	25–21	25–22	25–17		92–85	
Aug 25	10:00	Arellano Chiefs	3–1	De La Salle Green Archers	24–26	25–11	26–24	25–22		100–83	
Aug 25	12:00	Adamson Soaring Falcons	3–1	Benilde Blazers	25–16	18–25	25–20	31–29		99–90	
Aug 25	14:00	Perpetual Help Altas	3–1	San Beda Red Lions	25–14	28–26	22–25	25–13		100–78	
Aug 26	10:00	UST Growling Tigers	1–3	NU Bulldogs	22–25	25–18	22–25	20–25		89–93	
Aug 26	12:00	UP Fighting Maroons	2–3	FEU Tamaraws	21–25	25–22	25–22	17–25	11–15	99–109	

=== Fourth seed playoff ===
As FEU and Benilde are tied for fourth place in terms of win-loss record, a fourth seed playoff was held to determine the final semifinal berth.

Date	Time		Score		Set 1	Set 2	Set 3	Set 4	Set 5	Total	Report
Aug 29	10:00	FEU Tamaraws	3–0	Benilde Blazers	25–19	25–20	25–18			75–57	P–2

== Bracket ==
- All series are best-of-three.

Semifinals
1	NU Bulldogs	1	3	3
4	FEU Tamaraws	3	1	0
2	UST Growling Tigers	3	3	–
3	Adamson Soaring Falcons	1	2	–

Finals
NU Bulldogs	3	3	–
UST Growling Tigers	1	0	–
3rd place
FEU Tamaraws	3	3	–
Adamson Soaring Falcons	2	1	–

== Semifinals ==
=== (1) NU vs. (4) FEU ===
Date	Time		Score		Set 1	Set 2	Set 3	Set 4	Set 5	Total	Report
Sep 01	09:00	NU Bulldogs	1–3	FEU Tamaraws	25–21	22–25	17–25	23–25		87–96	
Sep 02	11:00	FEU Tamaraws	1–3	NU Bulldogs	21–25	20–25	25–21	21–25		87–96	P–2
Sep 05	10:00	NU Bulldogs	3–0	FEU Tamaraws	25–18	33–31	25–14			83–63	P–2

=== (2) UST vs. (3) Adamson ===
Date	Time		Score		Set 1	Set 2	Set 3	Set 4	Set 5	Total	Report
Sep 01	11:00	UST Growling Tigers	3–1	Adamson Soaring Falcons	25–18	25–22	16–25	32–30		98–95	
Sep 02	09:00	Adamson Soaring Falcons	2–3	UST Growling Tigers	15–25	25–16	22–25	25–22	8–15	95–103	P–2

== Third place series ==
Date	Time		Score		Set 1	Set 2	Set 3	Set 4	Set 5	Total	Report
Sep 09	09:00	FEU Tamaraws	3–2	Adamson Soaring Falcons	20–25	23–25	29–27	25–16	15–10	112–103	P–2
Sep 12	09:00	Adamson Soaring Falcons	1–3	FEU Tamaraws	21–25	25–17	28–30	23–25		97–97	P–2

== Finals ==
Date	Time		Score		Set 1	Set 2	Set 3	Set 4	Set 5	Total	Report
Sep 09	11:00	NU Bulldogs	3–1	UST Growling Tigers	21–25	25–23	25–18	25–17		96–83	P–2
Sep 12	11:00	UST Growling Tigers	0–3	NU Bulldogs	21–25	18–25	14–25			53–75	P–2

2018 Premier Volleyball League Men's Collegiate champions

1st title

Team Roster
Francis Philip Saura (c), Bryan Bagunas, Jann Paulo Ancheta, Kim Harold Dayandante, Krisvan Ponti, Banjo Mondero, Anjo Nicolas Almendrez, Jann Mariano Sumagui, James Martin Natividad, Berhashidin Daymil, Ricky Marcos, Ave Joshua Retamar, Kim Niño Malabunga, Madzlan Gampong
Head coach
Dante Alinsunurin

== Awards ==
Award		Player
Most Valuable Player	Finals: Conference:	Bryan Bagunas (NU); Paolo Pablico (Adamson)
Best Outside Spikers	1st: 2nd:	Bryan Bagunas (NU); Paolo Pablico (Adamson)
Best Middle Blockers	1st: 2nd:	John Paul Bugaoan (FEU); Jayvee Sumagaysay (UST)
Best Opposite Spiker		Joshua Umandal (UST)
Best Setter		Timothy James Tajanlangit (UST)
Best Libero		Ricky Marcos (NU)

== Final standings ==
Rank	Team
1st place, gold medalist(s)	NU Bulldogs
2nd place, silver medalist(s)	UST Growling Tigers
3rd place, bronze medalist(s)	FEU Tamaraws
4	Adamson Soaring Falcons
5	Benilde Blazers
6	UP Fighting Maroons
7	Perpetual Help Altas
8	De La Salle Green Archers
9	San Beda Red Lions
10	Arellano Chiefs
