= Team Dasma Monarchs =

The Dasmariñas City Monarchs are a Philippine volleyball team organization based in Dasmariñas, Cavite. The team competes in the Maharlika Pilipinas Volleyball Association (MPVA), fieldind a team in both the men's and women's divisions.

The team's roots date back to 2021 with the Team Dasma Monarchs, a men's team that competed in and won the 2021 PNVF Champions League. In 2025, an women's team joined the MPVA as an expansion side for its 2025 season. The following year, the Monarchs returned to the men's side when the MPVA launched its men's division.

== Men's team ==
Dasmariñas City Monarchs
- Full name: Dasmariñas City Monarchs
- Founded: 2021; 5 years ago
- History: Team Dasma Monarchs; 2021; Dasmariñas City Monarchs; 2026–present
- Head coach: Norman Miguel
- Captain: Jayvee Sumagaysay
- League: MPVA (men's division)

Representing Dasmariñas, Cavite, Team Dasma Monarchs entered the inaugural 2021 PNVF Champions League. The team roster of the side coached by Norman Miguel was formed in early October 2021 and consisted mostly of collegiate players who had not won a UAAP or NCAA title. The Monarchs clinched the tournament title by overcoming the Go for Gold–Air Force Aguilas in the final. The finishing was considered an upset due to the Aguilas having national players in its lineup. Consequentially they clinch a berth at the 2022 Asian Men's Club Volleyball Championship.

=== Roster ===
Team Dasma Monarchs
Number	Player	Position	Height
1	Joshua Jose		
2	Manuel Andrei Medina	Outside Hitter	
3	Arnold Baustista	Outside Hitter	
6	Mark Frederick Calado	Outside Hitter	
7	Jayvee Sumagaysay (c)	Middle Blocker	
8	Rence Melgar	Libero	
9	Timothy James Tajanlangit	Setter	
10	Jerome Medallion		
11	Earl Joshua Magadan	Libero	
12	George Labang	Opposite Hitter	
13	Ronniel Rosales	Middle Blocker	
15	Jason Canlas		
16	Kris Cian Silang	Setter	
18	Madzlan Gampong	Opposite Hitter	

Coaching staff
- Head coach:
  Norman Miguel
- Assistant coach:
  Jopet Adriam Movido

=== Records ===
2021 PNVF Champions League

Season	Placement
2021	Champion

== Women's team ==
Dasmariñas City Monarchs
- Full name: Dasmariñas City Monarchs
- Founded: 2025; 1 year ago
- History: Dasmariñas City Monarchs; 2025–present
- League: MPVA (women's division)

In 2025, the Dasmariñas City Monarchs joined as one of two expansion teams for the Maharlika Pilipinas Volleyball Association's 2025 season. The team is backed by National University, hence its roster is entirely composed of players from the Lady Bulldogs volleyball program.
