= 2018 Premier Volleyball League Reinforced Conference – Men's division =

First men's tournament of the 2018 PVL season

2018 Premier Volleyball League Reinforced Conference
- Duration: May 6 – July 11, 2018
- Teams: 6
- TV partner(s): S+A; Liga

Results
- Champions: Philippine Air Force Air Spikers
- Runners-up: Cignal HD Spikers
- Third place: Vice Co. Blockbusters
- Fourth place: PLDT Home Fibr Power Hitters

Awards
- Conference MVP: Marck Espejo
- Finals MVP: Bryan Bagunas
- Best OH: Marck Espejo; Fauzi Ismail
- Best MB: Rex Intal; John Paul Bugaoan
- Best OPP: John Vic De Guzman
- Best Setter: Ronchette Lee Villegas
- Best Libero: Rence Melgar

PVL Reinforced Conference chronology
- < 2017 2019 (ST) >

PVL conference chronology
- < 2017 Collegiate 2018 Collegiate >

The men's division of the 2018 Premier Volleyball League Reinforced Conference was the first conference of the 2018 Premier Volleyball League men's division season. The conference started on with the opening ceremonies and games on May 6, 2018 at the Filoil Flying V Centre, San Juan City, Philippines.

Teams will play a single round robin in the preliminary round. The top two teams (ranks 1 and 2) after the preliminary round will automatically enter the semifinals round. The bottom teams after the preliminary round will play a single round robin to determine the two teams (as ranks 3 and 4) that will advance to the semifinals round.

== Teams ==
2018 Premier Volleyball League Reinforced Conference (Men's Division)
| Abbr. | Team | Company | Head coach | Team captain |
|---|---|---|---|---|
| CIG | Cignal HD Spikers | Cignal TV, Inc. | (Philippines) Oliver Almadro | (Philippines) Ysay Marasigan |
| IEM | IEM Phoenix Volley Masters | Instituto Estetico Manila | (Philippines) Rafael Presnede | (Philippines) Gregorio Dolor |
| PLD | PLDT Home Fibr Power Hitters | PLDT, Inc. | (Philippines) Arthur Mamon | (Philippines) John Vic De Guzman |
| PAF | Philippine Air Force Air Spikers | Philippine Air Force | (Philippines) Rhovyl Verayo | (Philippines) Jessie Lopez |
| PAR | Philippine Army Troopers | Philippine Army | (Philippines) Rico de Guzman | (Philippines) Benjaylo Labide |
| VIC | Vice Co. Blockbusters | Vice Cosmetics | (Philippines) Reynaldo Diaz, Jr. | (Philippines) Jan Berlin Paglinawan |

== Format ==
Preliminary round

The six teams compete in a single round-robin tournament, with each team playing one match against all other teams for a total of five matches. The top two teams will advance to the semifinals while the bottom four will continue competing in the quarterfinals.

Quarterfinals

The botton four teams from the preliminary round compete in another single round-robin tournament, with each team playing a total of three matches. The top two teams will advance to the semifinals while the bottom two will be eliminated and be ranked 5th though 6th in the final standings.

Semifinals

The top two teams from the preliminary round and the top two from the quarterfinals compete in the semifinals. Teams compete in best-of-three series with the winners advancing to the finals while the losers will compete in the third place series. The match-ups for the semifinals are as follows:

- SF1: PR #1 vs. QF #2
- SF2: PR #2 vs. QF #1

Third place series

The losing teams from the semifinals compete in a best-of-three series to determine which team will finish third in this conference. If the series is tied at 1–1 when the championship is decided, the pool standing procedure will be used (starting from set ratio).

Finals

The winning teams from the semifinals compete in a best-of-three series to determine the conference champions. The losing team in this round will be declared conference runners-up.

== Pool standing procedure ==
Teams are initially ranked by wins followed by match points. A win awards three points if the match lasted for three or four sets (3–0 or 3–1), or two points if the match lasted for five sets (3–2). A loss only awards one point if the match lasted for five sets (2–3).

If multiple teams tie for wins and match points, the next criteria are set ratio (the number of sets won divided by number of sets lost across all matches) and point ratio (the number of points won divided by number of points lost across all matches). If any teams are still tied, the procedure will be applied again, but only considering matches between the remaining tied teams.

== Preliminary round ==
Team standings

| Pos | Team | Pld | W | L | Pts | SW | SL | SR | SPW | SPL | SPR | Qualification |
|---|---|---|---|---|---|---|---|---|---|---|---|---|
| 1 | Cignal HD Spikers | 5 | 4 | 1 | 11 | 13 | 6 | 2.167 | 451 | 390 | 1.156 | Semifinals |
| 2 | Vice Co. Blockbusters | 5 | 4 | 1 | 11 | 13 | 8 | 1.625 | 517 | 472 | 1.095 | Semifinals |
| 3 | PLDT Home Fibr Power Hitters | 5 | 2 | 3 | 8 | 11 | 10 | 1.100 | 464 | 453 | 1.024 | Quarterfinals |
| 4 | Philippine Air Force Air Spikers | 5 | 2 | 3 | 6 | 9 | 12 | 0.750 | 484 | 485 | 0.998 | Quarterfinals |
| 5 | IEM Volley Masters | 5 | 2 | 3 | 5 | 8 | 12 | 0.667 | 427 | 463 | 0.922 | Quarterfinals |
| 6 | Philippine Army Troopers | 5 | 1 | 4 | 3 | 8 | 14 | 0.571 | 416 | 496 | 0.839 | Quarterfinals |

Match results

- All times are in Philippines Standard Time (UTC+08:00)

| Date | Time | | Score | | Set 1 | Set 2 | Set 3 | Set 4 | Set 5 | Total | Report |
|---|---|---|---|---|---|---|---|---|---|---|---|
| May 06 | 10:00 | Philippine Army Troopers | 1–3 | Vice Co. Blockbusters | 13–25 | 16–25 | 29–27 | 21–25 | | 79–102 | P2 |
| May 09 | 10:00 | Philippine Air Force Air Spikers | 3–2 | PLDT Home Fibr Power Hitters | 25–15 | 22–25 | 24–26 | 25–16 | 15–12 | 111–94 | P2 |
| May 09 | 12:00 | IEM Phoenix Volley Masters | 3–1 | Philippine Army Troopers | 25–22 | 23–25 | 25–22 | 25–14 | | 98–83 | P2 |
| May 16 | 10:00 | Vice Co. Blockbusters | 1–3 | Cignal HD Spikers | 23–25 | 25–20 | 23–25 | 21–25 | | 92–95 | P2 |
| May 16 | 12:00 | PLDT Home Fibr Power Hitters | 2–3 | IEM Phoenix Volley Masters | 25–14 | 21–25 | 25–22 | 22–25 | 12–15 | 105–101 | P2 |
| May 19 | 10:00 | Philippine Army Troopers | 3–2 | Philippine Air Force Air Spikers | 25–23 | 21–25 | 25–23 | 25–27 | 15–12 | 111–110 | P2 |
| May 20 | 10:00 | Cignal HD Spikers | 1–3 | PLDT Home Fibr Power Hitters | 20–25 | 24–26 | 28–26 | 23–25 | | 95–102 | P2 |
| May 23 | 13:00 | IEM Phoenix Volley Masters | 1–3 | Vice Co. Blockbusters | 30–28 | 21–25 | 23–25 | 16–25 | | 90–103 | P2 |
| May 26 | 10:00 | PLDT Home Fibr Power Hitters | 3–0 | Philippine Army Troopers | 25–15 | 25–10 | 25–23 | | | 75–48 | P2 |
| May 27 | 10:00 | Philippine Air Force Air Spikers | 0–3 | Cignal HD Spikers | 20–25 | 16–25 | 10–25 | | | 46–75 | |
| May 30 | 13:00 | Cignal HD Spikers | 3–0 | IEM Phoenix Volley Masters | 25–20 | 25–19 | 25–16 | | | 75–55 | P2 |
| Jun 02 | 13:00 | Vice Co. Blockbusters | 3–1 | PLDT Home Fibr Power Hitters | 25–20 | 25–23 | 23–25 | 25–20 | | 98–88 | P2 |
| Jun 03 | 13:00 | IEM Phoenix Volley Masters | 1–3 | Philippine Air Force Air Spikers | 17–25 | 19–25 | 25–22 | 22–25 | | 83–97 | P2 |
| Jun 06 | 10:00 | Philippine Army Troopers | 2–3 | Cignal HD Spikers | 16–25 | 25–22 | 18–25 | 26–24 | 10–15 | 95–111 | P2 |
| Jun 06 | 13:00 | Philippine Air Force Air Spikers | 2–3 | Vice Co. Blockbusters | 19–25 | 34–32 | 25–19 | 28–30 | 14–16 | 120–122 | P2 |

== Quarterfinals ==
Team standings

| Pos | Team | Pld | W | L | Pts | SW | SL | SR | SPW | SPL | SPR | Qualification |
|---|---|---|---|---|---|---|---|---|---|---|---|---|
| 1 | Philippine Air Force Air Spikers | 3 | 3 | 0 | 9 | 9 | 3 | 3.000 | 293 | 263 | 1.114 | Semifinals |
| 2 | PLDT Home Fibr Power Hitters | 3 | 2 | 1 | 6 | 7 | 4 | 1.750 | 265 | 247 | 1.073 | Semifinals |
| 3 | Philippine Army Troopers | 3 | 1 | 2 | 2 | 4 | 8 | 0.500 | 260 | 285 | 0.912 | |
| 4 | IEM Volley Masters | 3 | 0 | 3 | 1 | 4 | 9 | 0.444 | 282 | 305 | 0.925 | |

Qualified to the semifinals

Match results

| Date | Time | | Score | | Set 1 | Set 2 | Set 3 | Set 4 | Set 5 | Total | Report |
|---|---|---|---|---|---|---|---|---|---|---|---|
| Jun 09 | 10:00 | PLDT Home Fibr Power Hitters | 3–1 | IEM Phoenix Volley Masters | 25–20 | 27–25 | 23–25 | 25–20 | | 100–90 | P2 |
| Jun 13 | 13:00 | Philippine Air Force Air Spikers | 3–1 | Philippine Army Troopers | 25–23 | 25–17 | 27–29 | 25–20 | | 102–89 | |
| Jun 16 | 10:00 | Philippine Army Troopers | 0–3 | PLDT Home Fibr Power Hitters | 14–25 | 24–26 | 20–25 | | | 58–76 | |
| Jun 20 | 13:00 | Philippine Air Force Air Spikers | 3–1 | IEM Phoenix Volley Masters | 25–19 | 25–19 | 17–25 | 25–22 | | 92–85 | P2 |
| Jun 23 | 10:00 | PLDT Home Fibr Power Hitters | 1–3 | Philippine Air Force Air Spikers | 21–25 | 26–24 | 19–25 | 23–25 | | 89–99 | P2 |
| Jun 27 | 13:00 | IEM Phoenix Volley Masters | 2–3 | Philippine Army Troopers | 18–25 | 23–25 | 25–22 | 27–25 | 14–16 | 107–113 | |

== Bracket ==
- All series are best-of-three.

Semifinals
1 | Cignal HD Spikers | 3 | 2 | 3
4 | PLDT Home Fibr Power Hitters | 0 | 3 | 0
2 | Vice Co. Blockbusters | 1 | 3 | 0
3 | Philippine Air Force Air Spikers | 3 | 2 | 3

Finals
Cignal HD Spikers | 2 | 2 | –
Philippine Air Force Air Spikers | 3 | 3 | –
3rd place
Vice Co. Blockbusters | 3 | 3 | –
PLDT Home Fibr Power Hitters | 1 | 0 | –

== Semifinals ==
=== (1) Cignal vs. (4) PLDT ===
| Date | Time | | Score | | Set 1 | Set 2 | Set 3 | Set 4 | Set 5 | Total | Report |
|---|---|---|---|---|---|---|---|---|---|---|---|
| Jul 01 | 10:00 | Cignal HD Spikers | 3–0 | PLDT Home Fibr Power Hitters | 25–22 | 25–20 | 26–24 | | | 76–66 | P2 |
| Jul 04 | 18:00 | PLDT Home Fibr Power Hitters | 3–2 | Cignal HD Spikers | 22–25 | 27–25 | 20–25 | 25–22 | 15–11 | 109–108 | P2 |
| Jul 06 | 10:00 | Cignal HD Spikers | 3–0 | PLDT Home Fibr Power Hitters | 25–23 | 25–19 | 33–31 | | | 83–73 | P2 |

=== (2) Vice vs. (3) Air Force ===
| Date | Time | | Score | | Set 1 | Set 2 | Set 3 | Set 4 | Set 5 | Total | Report |
|---|---|---|---|---|---|---|---|---|---|---|---|
| Jul 01 | 18:00 | Vice Co. Blockbusters | 1–3 | Philippine Air Force Air Spikers | 25–27 | 25–17 | 19–25 | 21–25 | | 90–94 | P2 |
| Jul 04 | 10:00 | Philippine Air Force Air Spikers | 2–3 | Vice Co. Blockbusters | 22–25 | 25–16 | 23–25 | 31–29 | 15–17 | 116–112 | |
| Jul 06 | 18:00 | Vice Co. Blockbusters | 0–3 | Philippine Air Force Air Spikers | 14–25 | 23–25 | 25–27 | | | 62–77 | P2 |

== Third place series ==
| Date | Time | | Score | | Set 1 | Set 2 | Set 3 | Set 4 | Set 5 | Total | Report |
|---|---|---|---|---|---|---|---|---|---|---|---|
| Jul 08 | 10:00 | Vice Co. Blockbusters | 3–1 | PLDT Home Fibr Power Hitters | 17–25 | 25–17 | 25–20 | 25–23 | | 92–85 | P2 |
| Jul 11 | 10:00 | PLDT Home Fibr Power Hitters | 0–3 | Vice Co. Blockbusters | 23–25 | 22–25 | 21–25 | | | 66–75 | P2 |

== Finals ==
| Date | Time | | Score | | Set 1 | Set 2 | Set 3 | Set 4 | Set 5 | Total | Report |
|---|---|---|---|---|---|---|---|---|---|---|---|
| Jul 08 | 18:00 | Cignal HD Spikers | 2–3 | Philippine Air Force Air Spikers | 25–22 | 23–25 | 25–19 | 28–30 | 8–15 | 109–111 | P2 |
| Jul 11 | 18:00 | Philippine Air Force Air Spikers | 3–2 | Cignal HD Spikers | 23–25 | 25–22 | 25–21 | 15–25 | 15–13 | 103–106 | P2 |

2nd Reinforced Conference Men's Division Champions
Philippine Air Force Air Spikers
Jeffrey Malabanan (c), Bryan Bagunas, Jessie Lopez, Juvie Mangaring, Niño Jeruz, Rodolfo Labrador Jr., Reuben Inaudito, Fauzi Ismail, Alnakhran Abdilla, Howard Mojica, Ricky Marcos, Reyson Fuentes, Edwin Tolentino, Pitrus De Ocampo
Head coach: Rhovyl Verayo

== Awards ==
| Award | | Player | Ref. |
|---|---|---|---|
| Most Valuable Player | Finals | (Philippines) Bryan Bagunas (Philippine Air Force) | |
| Most Valuable Player | Conference | (Philippines) Marck Espejo (Cignal) | |
| Best Outside Spikers | 1st: 2nd: | (Philippines) Marck Espejo (Cignal) (Philippines) Fauzi Ismail (Philippine Air Force) | |
| Best Middle Blockers | 1st: 2nd: | (Philippines) Rex Intal (Cignal) (Philippines) John Paul Bugaoan (Vice Co.) | |
| Best Opposite Spiker | | (Philippines) John Vic De Guzman (PLDT Home) | |
| Best Setter | | (Philippines) Ronchette Lee Villegas (PLDT Home) | |
| Best Libero | | (Philippines) Rence Melgar (PLDT Home) | |

== Final standings ==
| Rank | Team |
|---|---|
| 1st place, gold medalist(s) | Philippine Air Force Air Spikers |
| 2nd place, silver medalist(s) | Cignal HD Spikers |
| 3rd place, bronze medalist(s) | Vice Co. Blockbusters |
| 4 | PLDT Home Fibr Power Hitters |
| 5 | Philippine Army Troopers |
| 6 | IEM Phoenix Volley Masters |

== Medal team rosters ==
| Champions | Runners-up | Third place |
| Philippine Air Force Air Spikers | Cignal HD Spikers | Vice Co. Blockbusters |
| Juvie Mangaring; Jeffrey Malabanan (c); Niño Jeruz; Rodolfo Labrador Jr. Bryan Bagunas; Reuben Inaudito; Fauzi Ismail; Alnakhran Abdilla; Howard Mojica; Ricky Marcos; Reyson Fuentes; Jessie Lopez; Edwin Tolentino; Pitrus De Ocampo Head coach: (Philippines) Rhovyl Verayo | Sandy Domenick Montero; Joshua Alexis Miguel Villanueva; Peter Den Mar Torres; Edmar Bonono; Lorenzo Capate Jr. Rex Intal; Ysay Marasigan (c); Vince Mangulabnan; Wendel Miguel; Angelino Jose Petierra; Ish Polvorosa; Marck Jesus Espejo; Alexis Faytare; Timothy Sto. Tomas Head coach: (Philippines) Oliver Almadro | Richard Solis; Kris Cian Silang; Owen Jaime Suarez; Rikko Marius Marmeto; Jude Garcia; John Paul Bugaoan; Redjohn Paler; Paolo Pablico; Jayson Ramos; Jack Kalingking; Jan Berlin Paglinawan (c); Peter John Quiel; Kim Malabunga Head coach: (Philippines) Reynaldo Diaz Jr. |
