= 2018 Premier Volleyball League men's division/Spikers' Turf season =

Third season of the Spikers' Turf

2018 PVL men's division/Spikers' Turf season
- League: Spikers' Turf
- Sport: Volleyball
- Duration: May 6 – December 14, 2018
- Teams: 10
- TV partner: Hyper TV

Conference
- Reinforced champions: Philippine Air Force
- Reinforced runners-up: Cignal
- Collegiate champions: NU
- Collegiate runners-up: UST
- Open champions: Philippine Air Force Agilas
- Open runners-up: PLDT Home Fibr Power Hitters

PVL men's division/Spikers' Turf seasons
- ← 2017 2019 →

The 2018 Premier Volleyball League men's division/Spikers' Turf season was the fourth season of the men's league operated by Sports Vision and the second season of the Spikers' Turf integration into the Premier Volleyball League (PVL). The season ran from May 6 to December 14, 2018. The conference order from 2017 was retained with the Reinforced Conference coming first, followed by the Collegiate Conference.

Starting from the season-ending Open Conference, Spikers' Turf was re-established and spun-off as a separate entity from its women's counterpart.

== Reinforced Conference ==
=== Participating teams ===
2018 Premier Volleyball League Reinforced Conference (Men's Division)
Abbr.	Team	Company	Head coach	Team captain
CIG	Cignal HD Spikers	Cignal TV, Inc.	(Philippines) Oliver Almadro	(Philippines) Ysay Marasigan
IEM	IEM Phoenix Volley Masters	Instituto Estetico Manila	(Philippines) Rafael Presnede	(Philippines) Gregorio Dolor
PLD	PLDT Home Fibr Power Hitters	PLDT, Inc.	(Philippines) Arthur Mamon	(Philippines) John Vic De Guzman
PAF	Philippine Air Force Air Spikers	Philippine Air Force	(Philippines) Rhovyl Verayo	(Philippines) Jessie Lopez
PAR	Philippine Army Troopers	Philippine Army	(Philippines) Rico de Guzman	(Philippines) Benjaylo Labide
VIC	Vice Co. Blockbusters	Vice Cosmetics	(Philippines) Reynaldo Diaz, Jr.	(Philippines) Jan Berlin Paglinawan

=== Preliminary round ===
Team standings

Pos	Team	Pld	W	L	Pts	SW	SL	SR	SPW	SPL	SPR	Qualification
1	Cignal HD Spikers	5	4	1	11	13	6	2.167	451	390	1.156	Semifinals
2	Vice Co. Blockbusters	5	4	1	11	13	8	1.625	517	472	1.095	Semifinals
3	PLDT Home Fibr Power Hitters	5	2	3	8	11	10	1.100	464	453	1.024	Quarterfinals
4	Philippine Air Force Air Spikers	5	2	3	6	9	12	0.750	484	485	0.998	Quarterfinals
5	IEM Volley Masters	5	2	3	5	8	12	0.667	427	463	0.922	Quarterfinals
6	Philippine Army Troopers	5	1	4	3	8	14	0.571	416	496	0.839	Quarterfinals

=== Quarterfinals round ===
Team standings

Pos	Team	Pld	W	L	Pts	SW	SL	SR	SPW	SPL	SPR	Qualification
1	Philippine Air Force Air Spikers	3	3	0	9	9	3	3.000	293	263	1.114	Semifinals
2	PLDT Home Fibr Power Hitters	3	2	1	6	7	4	1.750	265	247	1.073	Semifinals
3	Philippine Army Troopers	3	1	2	2	4	8	0.500	260	285	0.912	
4	IEM Volley Masters	3	0	3	1	4	9	0.444	282	305	0.925	

Qualified to the semifinals

=== Final round ===
- All series are best-of-three.

Semifinals
1	Cignal HD Spikers	3	2	3
4	PLDT Home Fibr Power Hitters	0	3	0
2	Vice Co. Blockbusters	1	3	0
3	Philippine Air Force Air Spikers	3	2	3

Finals
Cignal HD Spikers	2	2	–
Philippine Air Force Air Spikers	3	3	–
3rd place
Vice Co. Blockbusters	3	3	–
PLDT Home Fibr Power Hitters	1	0	–

=== Awards ===
Award		Player	Ref.
Most Valuable Player	Finals	(Philippines) Bryan Bagunas (Philippine Air Force)	
Most Valuable Player	Conference	(Philippines) Marck Espejo (Cignal)	
Best Outside Spikers	1st: 2nd:	(Philippines) Marck Espejo (Cignal) (Philippines) Fauzi Ismail (Philippine Air Force)	
Best Middle Blockers	1st: 2nd:	(Philippines) Rex Intal (Cignal) (Philippines) John Paul Bugaoan (Vice Co.)	
Best Opposite Spiker		(Philippines) John Vic De Guzman (PLDT Home)	
Best Setter		(Philippines) Ronchette Lee Villegas (PLDT Home)	
Best Libero		(Philippines) Rence Melgar (PLDT Home)	

=== Final standings ===
Rank	Team
1st place, gold medalist(s)	Philippine Air Force Air Spikers
2nd place, silver medalist(s)	Cignal HD Spikers
3rd place, bronze medalist(s)	Vice Co. Blockbusters
4	PLDT Home Fibr Power Hitters
5	Philippine Army Troopers
6	IEM Phoenix Volley Masters

== Collegiate Conference ==
=== Participating teams ===
2018 Premier Volleyball League Collegiate Conference (Men's Division)
Abbr.	Team	Head coach	Team captain
ADU	Adamson Soaring Falcons	Domingo Custodio	Paolo Pablico
AUN	Arellano Chiefs	Sherwin Meneses	Christian Joshua Segovia
CSB	Benilde Blazers	Arnold Laniog	Francis Basilan
DLS	De La Salle Green Archers	Norman Miguel	Chris Bernard Dumago
FEU	FEU Tamaraws	Reynaldo Diaz Jr.	Redijohn Paler
NUI	NU Bulldogs	Dante Alinsunurin	Francis Saura
SBU	San Beda Red Lions	Ernesto Pamilar	Angelo Michael Torres
UPH	Perpetual Help Altas	Sinfronio Acaylar	John Patrick Ramos
UPD	UP Fighting Maroons	Hans Chuacuco	Jerry San Pedro Jr.
UST	UST Growling Tigers	Arthur Alan Mamon	Timothy James Tajanlangit

=== Preliminary round ===
Team standings

Pos	Team	Pld	W	L	Pts	SW	SL	SR	SPW	SPL	SPR	Qualification
1	NU Bulldogs	9	8	1	24	25	8	3.125	820	692	1.185	Semifinals
2	UST Growling Tigers	9	8	1	23	26	8	3.250	768	681	1.128	Semifinals
3	Adamson Soaring Falcons	9	6	3	19	21	13	1.615	812	761	1.067	Semifinals
4	FEU Tamaraws	9	5	4	15	19	18	1.056	791	779	1.015	Semifinals
5	Benilde Blazers	9	5	4	14	16	17	0.941	747	759	0.984	Fourth-seed playoff
6	UP Fighting Maroons	9	4	5	13	19	18	1.056	824	827	0.996	
7	Perpetual Help Altas	9	4	5	11	14	20	0.700	737	796	0.926	
8	De La Salle Green Archers	9	2	7	8	14	22	0.636	758	836	0.907	
9	San Beda Red Lions	9	2	7	5	10	24	0.417	743	819	0.907	
10	Arellano Chiefs	9	1	8	4	10	25	0.400	746	826	0.903	

Rules for classification: Point system: 3 points = win match in 3 or 4 sets; 2 points = win match in 5 sets; 1 point = lose match in 5 sets; 0 point = lose match in 3 or 4 sets

=== Final round ===
- All series are best-of-three.

Semifinals
1	NU Bulldogs	1	3	3
4	FEU Tamaraws	3	1	0
2	UST Growling Tigers	3	3	–
3	Adamson Soaring Falcons	1	2	–

Finals
NU Bulldogs	3	3	–
UST Growling Tigers	1	0	–
3rd place
FEU Tamaraws	3	3	–
Adamson Soaring Falcons	2	1	–

=== Awards ===
Award		Player
Most Valuable Player	Finals: Conference:	Bryan Bagunas (NU); Paolo Pablico (Adamson)
Best Outside Spikers	1st: 2nd:	Bryan Bagunas (NU); Paolo Pablico (Adamson)
Best Middle Blockers	1st: 2nd:	John Paul Bugaoan (FEU); Jayvee Sumagaysay (UST)
Best Opposite Spiker		Joshua Umandal (UST)
Best Setter		Timothy James Tajanlangit (UST)
Best Libero		Ricky Marcos (NU)

=== Final standings ===
Rank	Team
1st place, gold medalist(s)	NU Bulldogs
2nd place, silver medalist(s)	UST Growling Tigers
3rd place, bronze medalist(s)	FEU Tamaraws
4	Adamson Soaring Falcons
5	Benilde Blazers
6	UP Fighting Maroons
7	Perpetual Help Altas
8	De La Salle Green Archers
9	San Beda Red Lions
10	Arellano Chiefs

== Open Conference ==
The 2018 Spikers’ Turf Open Conference was the third and final conference of the 2018 Premier Volleyball League men's division/Spikers' Turf season. The tournament began on October 6, 2018 at the Blue Eagle Gym, Ateneo de Manila University campus, Quezon City, Philippines.

=== Participating teams ===
2018 Spikers’ Turf Open Conference
Abbr.	Team	Company	Colors	Head coach	Team captain
ADMU	Ateneo Blue Eagles-Fudgee Barr	Ateneo de Manila University and Republic Biscuit Corporation		Timothy James Sto. Tomas	Jasper Rodney Tan
ARM	Philippine Army Troopers	Philippine Army		Rico de Guzman	Benjaylo Labide
CIG	Cignal HD Spikers	Cignal TV, Inc.		Oliver Allan Almadro	Ysrael Wilson Marasigan
FUR	Fury Blazing Hitters	Cafe Lupe Hostel & Restaurant		Ralph Ocampo	Phillip Michael Bagalay
IEM	IEM Volley Masters	Instituto Estetico Manila		Rafael Presnede	Jeffrey Jimenez
PLDT	PLDT Home Fibr Power Hitters	PLDT		Arthur Mamon	Henry James Pecaña
PAF	Philippine Air Force Agilas	Philippine Air Force		Rhovyl Verayo	Jessie Lopez
PNV	Philippine Navy Fighting Stingrays	Philippine Navy		Bob Malenab	Milover Parcon
FEU	Prima–FEU Tamaraws	Far Eastern University		Reynaldo Diaz Jr.	Owen Suarez
NUI	Sta. Elena–NU Bulldogs	Sta. Elena Construction and Development Corporation		Dante Alinsunurin	Francis Philip Saura

=== Preliminary round ===
Pos	Team	Pld	W	L	Pts	SW	SL	SR	SPW	SPL	SPR	Qualification
1	Sta. Elena–NU Ball Hammers	9	7	2	20	24	11	2.182	808	738	1.095	Final round
2	PLDT Power Hitters	9	7	2	20	24	13	1.846	837	766	1.093	Final round
3	Philippine Air Force Agilas	9	7	2	18	22	14	1.571	794	755	1.052	Final round
4	Cignal HD Spikers	9	6	3	20	23	11	2.091	789	706	1.118	Final round
5	Prima–FEU	9	5	4	17	22	15	1.467	838	803	1.044	
6	Ateneo–Fudgee Bar	9	5	4	16	19	16	1.188	779	744	1.047	
7	Philippine Navy Fighting Stingrays	9	4	5	12	15	18	0.833	728	747	0.975	
8	IEM Volley Masters	9	2	7	7	11	22	0.500	715	792	0.903	
9	Philippine Army Troopers	9	2	7	4	8	25	0.320	719	775	0.928	
10	Fury Blazing Hitters	9	0	9	1	4	27	0.148	602	769	0.783	

=== Final round ===
Semifinals; Best-of-three series
1	~~Sta. Elena~~	2
4	Cignal	1
2	PLDT	2
3	Air Force	1

Finals play-off One game play-off
3	Air Force	1
4	Cignal	0

Finals; PLDT has twice-to-beat advantage
2	PLDT	0
3	Air Force	2

=== Awards ===
Award		Player	Ref.
Most Valuable Player	Finals	Alnakran Abdilla (Air Force)	
Most Valuable Player	Conference	Bryan Bagunas (Sta. Elena–NU)	
Best Outside Spikers	1st: 2nd:	Alnakran Abdilla (Air Force); Bryan Bagunas (Sta. Elena–NU)	
Best Middle Blockers	1st: 2nd:	Peter Den Mar Torres (Cignal); Jayvee Sumagaysay (PLDT)	
Best Opposite Spiker		Ysrael Wilson Marasigan (Cignal)	
Best Setter		Ronchette Lee Villegas (PLDT)	
Best Libero		Ricky Marcos (Sta. Elena–NU)	

=== Final standings ===
Rank	Team
1st place, gold medalist(s)	Philippine Air Force Agilas
2nd place, silver medalist(s)	PLDT Home Fibr Power Hitters
3rd place, bronze medalist(s)	Cignal HD Spikers
4	Sta. Elena–NU Ball Hammers
5	Prima–FEU Tamaraws
6	Ateneo Blue Eagles–Fudgee Bar
7	Philippine Navy Fighting Stingrays
8	IEM Volley Masters
9	Philippine Army Troopers
10	Fury Blazing Hitters

== Conference results ==
Conference	Champion	Runner-up	3rd	4th	5th	6th	7th	8th	9th	10th
Reinforced	Air Force	Cignal	Vice Co.	PLDT	Army	IEM	—N/a			
Collegiate	NU	UST	FEU	Adamson	Benilde	UP	Perpetual	De La Salle	San Beda	Arellano
Open	Air Force	PLDT	Cignal	Sta. Elena-NU	Prima–FEU	Ateneo–Fudgee Bar	Navy	IEM	Army	Fury
