= 2019 Spikers' Turf Open Conference =

- Duration: August 20 – October 22, 2019
- Teams: 24

Results
- Champions: Cignal HD Spikers
- Runners-up: Go for Gold–Air Force
- Third place: Sta. Elena–NU Ball Hammers
- Fourth place: Perpetual Altas

Awards
- Conference MVP: Ysay Marasigan
- Finals MVP: Marck Espejo
- Best OH: Ranran Abdilla; Marck Espejo
- Best MB: Francis Saura; Anjo Pertierra
- Best OPP: Ysay Marasigan
- Best Setter: Owa Retamar
- Best Libero: Ricky Marcos

Spikers' Turf Open Conference chronology
- < 2018 2022 >

Spikers' Turf conference chronology
- < 2019 Reinforced 2022 Open >

The 2019 Spikers’ Turf Open Conference was the second and final conference of the 2019 season of Spikers' Turf and the fifth running of the Open Conference. The tournament began on August 20, 2019 with a total of 24 teams. San Beda replaced PNP, which was forced to withdraw from the competition after failing to secure permission from their superior officers.

A total of four pools with six squads each pool that will compete in a single-round robin elimination round.

== Participating teams ==
2019 Spikers’ Turf Open Conference – Pool A
Abbr.	Team	Company/sponsor	Colors	Head coach	Team Captain
ADU	Adamson Soaring Falcons	Adamson University		Domingo Custodio	Leo Miranda
CIG	Cignal HD Spikers	Cignal TV, Inc.		Dexter Clamor	Ysrael Wilson Marasigan
EAC	EAC Generals	Emilio Aguinaldo College		Rodrigo Palmero	Ralph Joshua Pitogo
IEM	IEM Phoenix Volley Masters	Instituto Estetico Manila		Pathie Jamiri	Leonel Evan Laraya
NCBA	NCBA Wildcats	National College of Business and Arts		Ernesto Balubar Jr.	Cj Oclima
VNS	VNS Griffins	VNS Management Group		Ralph Ocampo	Guel Asia

2019 Spikers’ Turf Open Conference – Pool B
Abbr.	Team	Company/sponsor	Colors	Head coach	Team Captain
ADMU	Ateneo Blue Eagles	Ateneo de Manila University		Timothy James Sto. Tomas	Jasper Rodney Tan
CEU	CEU Scorpions	Centro Escolar University		Mark Anthony Santos	Niño Nazareno
DLSU	ECO Oil–La Salle Green Archers	ECO Oil Ltd.–De La Salle University		Arnold Laniog	Wayne Ferdi Marco
ESY	Easy Trip–Raimol	Easytrip Services Corporation Philippines and Rainchem International, Inc.		Jose Roque	Red Christensen
LPU	Lyceum Pirates	Lyceum of the Philippines University		Emil Lontoc	Miko Binas
PAF	Go for Gold–Air Force	Philippine Air Force / Go For Gold		Dante Alinsunurin	Jessie Lopez

2019 Spikers’ Turf Open Conference – Pool C
Abbr.	Team	Company/sponsor	Colors	Head coach	Team Captain
FEU	Hachiran–FEU Tamaraws	Far Eastern University		Reynaldo Diaz Jr.	Owen Suarez
PAR	Philippine Army Troopers	Philippine Army		Rico de Guzman	Randy Fallorina
PCG	Philippine Coast Guard Dolphins	Philippine Coast Guard		Jeffrey Dela Cruz	Al-frazin Abdulwahab
PLDT	PLDT Home Fibr Power Hitters	Philippine Long Distance Telephone Company		Arthur Mamon	John Vic De Guzman
SSC-R	San Sebastian Stags	San Sebastian College – Recoletos		Clint Malazo	John Timothy Eusebio
UPHSD	Perpetual Altas	University of Perpetual Help System DALTA		Sinfronio Acaylar	Ridzuan Muhali

2019 Spikers’ Turf Open Conference – Pool D
Abbr.	Team	Company/sponsor	Colors	Head coach	Team Captain
AU	Arellano Chiefs	Arellano University		Sherwin Meneses	Christian Joshua Segovia
MU	Mapúa Cardinals	Mapúa University		Paul Jan Dolorias	Reje Emmanuel Hizon
SBU	San Beda Red Lions	San Beda University		Alegro Carpio	Mark Lorenze Santos
PNV	Philippine Navy Sea Lions	Philippine Navy		Edgardo Rusit	Relan Taneo
NU	Sta. Elena-NU Bulldogs	Sta. Elena Construction and Development Corporation		Ariel Dela Cruz	James Martin Nativdad
UST	UST Growling Tigers	University of Santo Tomas		Arthur Alan Mamon	Manuel Andrei Medina

== Format ==
Preliminary round

- In the preliminary round, teams were split into four groups of six.
- The preliminary round was a single round-robin tournament, with each team playing one match against all other teams in their pool for a total of five matches.
- The top two teams from each group advanced to the quarterfinals while the bottom four were eliminated.

Quarterfinals

- The quarterfinals featured the twice-to-beat advantage. The higher-seeded team in a match-up only needed to win one out of two matches to advance while the lower-seeded team needed to win two matches back-to-back to do so.
- The match-ups were as follows:
  - QF1: A1 vs. B2
  - QF2: B1 vs. C2
  - QF3: C1 vs. D2
  - QF4: D1 vs. A2
- The winners advanced to the semifinals while the losers were eliminated.

Semifinals

- The semifinals featured best-of-three series.
- The match-ups were as follows:
  - SF1: QF1 winner vs. QF3 winner
  - SF2: QF2 winner vs. QF4 winner
- The winners advanced to the championship while the losers would play in the third-place series.

Finals

- The championship and third-place series were best-of-three series.
- The match-ups were as follows:
  - Championship: Semifinal round winners
  - Third-place series: Semifinal round losers

== Pool standing procedure ==
- First, teams are ranked by the number of matches won.
- If the number of matches won is tied, the tied teams are then ranked by match points, wherein:
  - Match won 3–0 or 3–1: 3 match points for the winner, 0 match points for the loser.
  - Match won 3–2: 2 match points for the winner, 1 match point for the loser.
- In case of any further ties, the following criteria shall be used:
  - Set ratio: the number of sets won divided by number of sets lost.
  - Point ratio: number of points scored divided by number of points allowed.
  - Head-to-head standings: any remaining tied teams are ranked based on the results of head-to-head matches involving the teams in question.

== Preliminary round ==
=== Ranking ===
Pool A

Pos	Team	Pld	W	L	Pts	SW	SL	SR	SPW	SPL	SPR	Qualification
1	Cignal HD Spikers	5	5	0	15	15	2	7.500	439	316	1.389	Quarterfinals
2	IEM Phoenix Volley Masters	5	4	1	11	13	7	1.857	460	436	1.055	Quarterfinals
3	VNS Griffins	5	3	2	8	10	10	1.000	430	456	0.943	
4	Adamson Soaring Falcons	5	2	3	7	11	11	1.000	456	475	0.960	
5	EAC Generals	5	1	4	4	7	12	0.583	421	424	0.993	
6	NCBA Wildcats	5	0	5	0	1	15	0.067	305	404	0.755	

Pool B

Pos	Team	Pld	W	L	Pts	SW	SL	SR	SPW	SPL	SPR	Qualification
1	Go for Gold-Air Force	5	5	0	13	15	5	3.000	469	369	1.271	Quarterfinals
2	Ateneo Blue Eagles	5	4	1	11	14	8	1.750	481	444	1.083	Quarterfinals
3	ECO Oil-La Salle Green Archers	5	3	2	11	13	8	1.625	470	418	1.124	
4	Easy Trip-Raimol	5	2	3	7	10	10	1.000	470	418	1.124	
5	Lyceum Pirates	5	1	4	3	6	13	0.462	376	443	0.849	
6	CEU Scorpions	5	0	5	0	1	15	0.067	292	393	0.743	

Pool C

Pos	Team	Pld	W	L	Pts	SW	SL	SR	SPW	SPL	SPR	Qualification
1	Perpetual Altas	5	5	0	15	15	3	5.000	445	376	1.184	Quarterfinals
2	PLDT Power Hitters	5	4	1	11	13	5	2.600	427	361	1.183	Quarterfinals
3	Hachiran-FEU Tamaraws	5	3	2	10	12	6	2.000	425	372	1.142	
4	Philippine Army Troopers	5	1	4	4	5	12	0.417	352	396	0.889	
5	San Sebastian Stags	5	1	4	3	3	13	0.231	333	395	0.843	
6	Coast Guard Dolphins	5	1	4	2	5	14	0.357	356	438	0.813	

Pool D

Pos	Team	Pld	W	L	Pts	SW	SL	SR	SPW	SPL	SPR	Qualification
1	Sta. Elena Ball Hammers	5	5	0	14	15	3	5.000	428	338	1.266	Quarterfinals
2	Philippine Navy Sea Lions	5	4	1	13	14	3	4.667	410	345	1.188	Quarterfinals
3	UST Growling Tigers	5	2	3	6	9	12	0.750	460	473	0.973	
4	Arellano Chiefs	5	2	3	5	7	11	0.636	365	418	0.873	
5	Mapúa Cardinals	5	2	3	5	7	12	0.583	395	426	0.927	
6	San Beda Red Lions	5	0	5	2	4	15	0.267	378	436	0.867	

=== Match results ===
- All times are in Philippines Standard Time (UTC+08:00)

Date	Time		Score		Set 1	Set 2	Set 3	Set 4	Set 5	Total	Report
Aug 20	13:00	EAC	2–3	ADU	25–20	18–25	25–21	19–25	12–15	99–106	P–2
Aug 20	15:00	PAF	3–0	LPU	25–11	25–15	25–18			75–44	P–2
Aug 20	17:00	PCG	1–3	UPH	25–22	16–25	15–25	21–25		77–97	P–2
Aug 22	13:00	STE	3–0	MUN	25–8	25–19	25–21			75–48	P–2
Aug 22	15:00	ADU	3–0	NCB	25–23	25–15	25–15			75–53	P–2
Aug 22	17:00	CEU	0–3	EGS	18–25	17–25	19–25			54–75	P–2
Aug 25	13:00	PLD	3–0	SSC	25–15	25–21	25–21			75–57	P–2
Aug 25	15:00	UST	2–3	AUN	25–20	26–28	25–23	22–25	14–16	112–112	P–2
Aug 25	17:00	NCB	0–3	EAC	15–25	18–25	17–25			50–75	P–2
Aug 27	13:00	ESY	3–0	CEU	25–22	25–18	25–18			75–58	P–2
Aug 27	15:00	UPH	3–1	FEU	26–24	23–25	25–21	25–23		99–93	P–2
Aug 27	17:00	MUN	1–3	UST	22–25	25–22	14–25	23–25		84–97	P–2
Aug 29	13:00	IEM	3–2	ADU	20–25	25–14	25–27	25–20	16–14	111–100	P–2
Aug 29	15:00	CEU	0–3	PAF	16–25	16–25	13–25			45–75	P–2
Aug 29	17:00	PAR	0–3	PLD	15–25	25–27	20–25			60–77	P–2
Sep 01	13:00	AUN	0–3	PNV	23–25	21–25	18–25			62–75	P–2
Sep 01	15:00	CIG	3–0	NCB	25–12	25–14	25–18			75–44	P–2
Sep 01	17:00	UPH	3–0	PAR	25–21	25–22	25–10			75–53	P–2
Sep 03	13:00	SSC	0–3	UPH	21–25	20–25	27–29			68–79	P–2
Sep 03	15:00	AUN	0–3	STE	12–25	19–25	13–25			44–75	P–2
Sep 03	17:00	EAC	1–3	VNS	23–25	25–15	24–26	21–25		93–91	P–2
Sep 05	13:00	EGS	3–1	LPU	25–23	23–25	25–14	25–20		98–82	P–2
Sep 05	15:00	PCG	3–2	PAR	15–25	16–25	25–21	25–17	15–12	96–100	P–2
Sep 05	17:00	SBU	2–3	MUN	17–25	25–17	25–22	24–26	13–15	104–105	P–2
Sep 08	13:00	IEM	1–3	CIG	10–25	21–25	36–34	14–25		81–109	P–2
Sep 08	15:00	LPU	1–3	ADM	23–25	20–25	25–18	16–25		84–93	P–2
Sep 08	17:00	PAR	0–3	FEU	25–27	16–25	19–25			60–77	P–2
Sep 10	13:00	SBU	2–3	UST	25–23	25–17	15–25	23–25	10–15	98–105	P–2
Sep 10	15:00	VNS	3–2	ADU	13–25	26–24	20–25	25–15	15–11	99–100	P–2
Sep 10	17:00	ESY	1–3	PAF	21–25	25–23	17–25	13–25		76–98	P–2
Sep 12	13:00	UPH	3–1	PLD	20–25	25–22	25–21	25–17		95–85	
Sep 12	15:00	UST	0–3	PNV	20–25	21–25	18–25			59–75	
Sep 12	17:00	CIG	3–0	EAC	25–22	25–21	25–18			75–61	
Sep 15	13:00	ADM	3–2	EGS	20–25	25–23	23–25	25–21	15–10	108–104	P–2
Sep 15	15:00	FEU	3–0	PCG	25–14	25–21	25–17			75–52	P–2
Sep 15	17:00	AUN	3–0	SBU	25–19	25–17	25–23			75–59	P–2
Sep 17	13:00	IEM	3–0	NCB	25–20	25–19	25–14			75–53	P–2
Sep 17	15:00	ESY	3–1	LPU	17–25	25–15	25–17	25–23		92–80	P–2
Sep 17	17:00	SSC	0–3	PAR	22–25	27–29	22–25			71–79	P–2P–4
Sep 19	13:00	PNV	3–0	MUN	25–19	25–16	28–26			78–61	P–2
Sep 19	15:00	EAC	1–3	IEM	28–26	24–26	21–25	20–25		93–102	P–2
Sep 19	17:00	CEU	0–3	ADM	17–25	19–25	14–25			50–75	P–2P–4
Sep 22	13:00	ADM	3–2	ESY	19–25	25–21	25–18	21–25	15–8	105–97	
Sep 22	15:00	UST	1–3	STE	12–25	25–23	21–25	29–21		87–94	
Sep 22	17:00	CIG	3–0	VNS	25–20	25–19	25–16			75–55	
Sep 24	13:00	EGS	2–3	PAF	21–25	20–25	25–17	25–23	13–15	104–105	P–2
Sep 24	15:00	PLD	3–2	FEU	22–25	28–30	25–15	25–22	15–10	115–102	P–2
Sep 24	17:00	STE	3–0	SBU	25–15	25–19	25–19			75–53	P–2P–4
Sep 26	13:00	IEM	3–1	VNS	25–23	16–25	25–14	25–19		91–81	P–2
Sep 26	15:00	LPU	3–1	CEU	25–16	25–23	18–25	25–21		93–85	P–2
Sep 26	17:00	FEU	3–0	SSC	25–8	25–12	28–26			78–46	P–2
Sep 29	14:00	SBU	0–3	PNV	19–25	24–26	21–25			64–76	
Sep 29	16:00	CIG	3–1	ADU	25–10	25–18	30–32	25–15		105–75	
Sep 29	18:00	PAF	3–2	ADM	25–14	20–25	28–26	21–25	15–10	109–100	
Oct 01	13:00	PLD	3–0	PCG	25–4	25–22	25–21			75–47	P–2
Oct 01	15:00	PNV	2–3	STE	23–25	25–14	25–20	21–25	12–15	106–99	P–2
Oct 01	17:00	VNS	3–1	NCB	27–25	25–22	27–29	25–21		104–97	P–2
Oct 03	13:00	EGS	3–1	ESY	14–25	25–13	25–21	25–17		89–76	P–2
Oct 03	15:00	PCG	1–3	SSC	19–25	18–25	25–16	22–25		84–91	P–2
Oct 03	17:00	AUN	1–3	MUN	13–25	19–25	25–22	15–25		72–97	P–2

== Final round ==
Quarterfinals * – twice to beat advantage
Cignal HD Spikers*	3	–	–
Ateneo Blue Eagles	0	–	–
Perpetual Altas*	3	–	–
Philippine Navy Sea Lions	2	–	–
Go for Gold-Air Force*	3	–	–
PLDT Power Hitters	1	–	–
Sta. Elena-NU Ball Hammers*	0	3	–
IEM Phoenix Volley Masters	3	2	–

Semifinals best of three
Cignal HD Spikers	3	3	–
Perpetual Altas	0	0	–
Go for Gold-Air Force	2	3	3
Sta. Elena-NU Ball Hammers	3	1	1

Championship best of three
Cignal HD Spikers	3	3	–
Go for Gold-Air Force	2	2	–
Third place
Perpetual Altas	1	0	–
Sta. Elena-NU Ball Hammers	3	3	–

=== Quarterfinals ===
- All times are in Philippines Standard Time (UTC+08:00)

Date	Time		Score		Set 1	Set 2	Set 3	Set 4	Set 5	Total	Report
Oct 08	10:00	CIG	3–0	ADM	25–17	25–22	25–12			75–51	
Oct 08	12:00	PAF	3–1	PLD	28–26	21–25	25–21	25–22		99–94	
Oct 08	15:00	UPH	3–2	PNV	25–23	16–25	25–20	22–25	15–11	103–104	
Oct 08	17:00	STE	0–3	IEM	23–25	22–25	22–25			67–75	
Oct 10	10:00	IEM	2–3	STE	25–22	25–21	26–28	21–25	4–15	101–111	

=== Semifinals ===
Date	Time		Score		Set 1	Set 2	Set 3	Set 4	Set 5	Total	Report
Oct 13	15:00	CIG	3–0	UPH	25–17	25–23	25–15			75–55	P–2
Oct 15	17:00	UPH	0–3	CIG	15–25	18–25	17–25			50–75	P–2
Oct 13	17:00	PAF	2–3	STE	20–25	25–23	22–25	25–20	8–15	100–108	P–2
Oct 15	15:00	STE	1–3	PAF	24–26	23–25	25–19	18–25		90–95	P–2
Oct 17	15:00	PAF	3–1	STE	18–25	25–18	25–15	25–21		93–79	

=== Finals ===
Third place

Date	Time		Score		Set 1	Set 2	Set 3	Set 4	Set 5	Total	Report
Oct 20	15:00	STE	3–1	UPH	25–13	22–25	25–20	25–22		97–80	P–2
Oct 22	15:00	UPH	0–3	STE	21–25	21–25	19–25			61–75	P–2

Championships

Date	Time		Score		Set 1	Set 2	Set 3	Set 4	Set 5	Total	Report
Oct 20	17:00	PAF	2–3	CIG	18–25	25–22	25–21	20–25	11–15	99–108	P–2
Oct 22	17:00	CIG	3–2	PAF	21–25	25–22	24–26	25–16	15–6	110–95	P–2

== Awards ==
Award		Player	Ref.
Most Valuable Player	Finals	Marck Espejo (Cignal)	
Most Valuable Player	Conference	Ysay Marasigan (Cignal)	
Best Outside Spikers	1st: 2nd:	Ran Abdilla (Air Force); Marck Espejo (Cignal)	
Best Middle Blockers	1st: 2nd:	Francis Saura (Air Force); Anjo Pertierra (Cignal)	
Best Opposite Spiker		Ysay Marasigan (Cignal)	
Best Setter		Joshua Retamar (Sta. Elena-NU)	
Best Libero		Ricky Marcos (Sta. Elena-NU)	

== Final standings ==
Rank	Team
1st place, gold medalist(s)	Cignal HD Spikers
2nd place, silver medalist(s)	Go for Gold-Air Force
3rd place, bronze medalist(s)	Sta. Elena-NU Ball Hammers
4	Perpetual Altas
5	Philippine Navy Sea Lions
6	PLDT Home Fibr Power Hitters
7	IEM Phoenix Volley Masters
8	Ateneo Blue Eagles
9	ECO Oil-La Salle Green Archers
10	Hachiran-FEU Tamaraws
11	VNS Griffins
12	Easy Trip-Raimol
13	Adamson Soaring Falcons
14	UST Growling Tigers
15	Arellano Chiefs
16	Mapúa Cardinals
17	Philippine Army Troopers
18	EAC Generals
19	Lyceum Pirates
20	San Sebastian Stags
21	Coast Guard Dolphins
22	San Beda Red Lions
23	NCBA Wildcats
24	CEU Scorpions

== See also ==
- 2019 Premier Volleyball League Open Conference
