= 2015 Spikers' Turf Open Conference =

First conference of the 2015 SPT season

- Duration: April 5 – June 2, 2015
- Teams: 8
- TV partner(s): PTV-4

Results
- Champions: PLDT Home Ultera Ultra Fast Hitters
- Runners-up: Cagayan Valley Rising Suns
- Third place: Philippine Air Force Air Men
- Fourth place: Cignal HD Spikers

Awards
- Conference MVP: Marck Espejo
- Finals MVP: Mark Gil Alfafara
- Best OH: Marck Espejo; John Paul Torres
- Best MB: Reyson Fuentes; Peter Torres
- Best OPP: Mark Gil Alfafara
- Best Setter: Jessie Lopez
- Best Libero: Erickson Joseph Ramos

Spikers' Turf Open Conference chronology
- 2016 >

Spikers' Turf conference chronology
- < 2014 Reinforced Open (SVL) 2015 Collegiate >

The 2015 Spikers' Turf Open Conference was the inaugural conference of Spikers' Turf and the 2015 season. The opening ceremony was held on April 5, 2015 with the first match of volleyball game at the Filoil Flying V Arena in San Juan, Metro Manila. There were eight competing teams in this conference.

== Teams ==
Abbr.	Name
CAG	Cagayan Valley Rising Suns
CHM	Champion Infinity Active Smashers
CIG	Cignal HD Spikers
FRB	Fourbees Cavite Patriots Total Attackers
IEM	Instituto Estetico Manila Phoenix Volley Masters
PAF	Philippine Air Force Air Men
PAR	Philippine Army Troopers
PLD	PLDT Home Ultera Ultra Fast Hitters

== Format ==
Preliminary round

- The preliminary round was a single round-robin tournament, with each team playing one match against all other teams for a total of seven matches.
- The top four teams advanced to the semifinals while the bottom four were eliminated.

Semifinals

- The semifinals was also a single round-robin, with each team playing three matches in this round.
- The top two teams advanced to the championship match while the bottom two would play in the third-place match.

Finals

- The championship and third-place series were best-of-three series.
- The match-ups were as follows:
  - Championship: Semifinal round winners
  - Third-place series: Semifinal round losers
- If the championship ends after two matches, which can only occur if either team wins 2–0, the third-place series will immediately end even if it is tied. Tiebreakers would be used to determine the winner of the third-place series in this scenario.

== Pool standing procedure ==
- First, teams are ranked by the number of matches won.
- If the number of matches won is tied, the tied teams are then ranked by match points, wherein:
  - Match won 3–0 or 3–1: 3 match points for the winner, 0 match points for the loser.
  - Match won 3–2: 2 match points for the winner, 1 match point for the loser.
- In case of any further ties, the following criteria shall be used:
  - Set ratio: the number of sets won divided by number of sets lost.
  - Point ratio: number of points scored divided by number of points allowed.
  - Head-to-head standings: any remaining tied teams are ranked based on the results of head-to-head matches involving the teams in question.

== Preliminary round ==
Pos	Team	Pld	W	L	Pts	SW	SL	SR	SPW	SPL	SPR	Qualification
1	Cagayan Valley Rising Suns	7	6	1	16	20	10	2.000	678	631	1.074	Final round
2	PLDT Home Ultera Ultra Fast Hitters	7	5	2	17	19	10	1.900	697	617	1.130	Final round
3	Cignal HD Spikers	7	4	3	13	16	9	1.778	613	547	1.121	Final round
4	Philippine Air Force Air Men	7	4	3	12	15	12	1.250	625	616	1.015	Final round
5	Philippine Army Troopers	7	4	3	12	15	13	1.154	623	606	1.028	
6	Champion Infinity Active Smashers	7	4	3	11	15	14	1.071	657	656	1.002	
7	Fourbees Cavite Patriots Total Attackers	7	1	6	3	4	19	0.211	435	573	0.759	
8	IEM Phoenix Volley Masters	7	0	7	0	4	21	0.190	544	616	0.883	

Date	Time		Score		Set 1	Set 2	Set 3	Set 4	Set 5	Total	Report
04/05	09:00	Cagayan Valley Rising Suns	3–2	Champion Infinity Active Smashers	23–25	24–26	25–21	25–22	16–14	113–108	
04/07	09:00	Fourbees Cavite Patriots Total Attackers	0–3	PLDT Home Ultera Ultra Fast Hitters	19–25	17–25	10–25			46–75	
04/07	11:00	Instituto Estetico Manila Phoenix Volley Masters	1–3	Philippine Army Troopers	16–25	25–22	24–26	19–25		84–98	
04/09	09:00	Philippine Air Force Air Men	3–1	Cignal HD Spikers	25–22	25–22	15–25	25–22		90–91	
04/09	11:00	Cagayan Valley Rising Suns	3–0	Fourbees Cavite Patriots Total Attackers	25–16	25–18	25–15			75–49	
04/12	09:00	Cignal HD Spikers	1–3	PLDT Home Ultera Ultra Fast Hitters	20–25	29–27	22–25	21–25		92–102	
04/12	17:00	Philippine Army Troopers	2–3	Champion Infinity Active Smashers	25–20	25–23	19–25	26–28	13–15	108–111	
04/14	09:00	Fourbees Cavite Patriots Total Attackers	0–3	Philippine Army Troopers	18–25	17–25	21–25			56–75	
04/14	11:00	PLDT Home Ultera Ultra Fast Hitters	2–3	Cagayan Valley Rising Suns	20–25	24–26	25–12	25–22	10–15	104–100	
04/16	09:00	Cagayan Valley Rising Suns	3–1	Philippine Air Force Air Men	25–16	25–22	21–25	26–24		97–87	
04/16	11:00	Cignal HD Spikers	3–0	Instituto Estetico Manila Phoenix Volley Masters	25–22	26–24	25–22			76–68	
04/19	09:00	Philippine Army Troopers	0–3	Cignal HD Spikers	21–25	25–27	21–25			67–77	
04/19	17:00	Philippine Air Force Air Men	3–1	Champion Infinity Active Smashers	25–20	25–21	29–31	25–22		104–94	
04/21	09:00	PLDT Home Ultera Ultra Fast Hitters	3–1	Philippine Army Troopers	25–19	25–23	17–25	25–22		92–89	
04/21	11:00	Champion Infinity Active Smashers	3–0	Instituto Estetico Manila Phoenix Volley Masters	25–19	25–23	25–20			75–62	
04/23	09:00	Instituto Estetico Manila Phoenix Volley Masters	1–3	Philippine Air Force Air Men	20–25	19–25	25–16	16–25		80–91	
04/23	11:00	Cignal HD Spikers	3–0	Fourbees Cavite Patriots Total Attackers	25–13	28–26	25–11			78–50	
04/26	09:00	Cagayan Valley Rising Suns	3–2	Cignal HD Spikers	25–23	18–25	22–25	31–29	15–12	111–114	
04/26	11:00	PLDT Home Ultera Ultra Fast Hitters	2–3	Champion Infinity Active Smashers	26–28	25–20	25–17	20–25	20–22	116–112	
04/28	09:00	Philippine Army Troopers	3–1	Philippine Air Force Air Men	25–22	16–25	25–14	25–18		91–79	
04/28	11:00	Instituto Estetico Manila Phoenix Volley Masters	0–3	Cagayan Valley Rising Suns	18–25	23–25	23–25			64–75	
04/30	09:00	Fourbees Cavite Patriots Total Attackers	3–1	Instituto Estetico Manila Phoenix Volley Masters	25–23	20–25	30–28	25–21		100–97	
04/30	11:00	Cagayan Valley Rising Suns	2–3	Philippine Army Troopers	23–25	25–19	25–21	21–25	13–15	107–105	
05/10	09:00	Philippine Air Force Air Men	1–3	PLDT Home Ultera Ultra Fast Hitters	23–25	27–25	19–25	30–32		99–107	
05/10	17:00	Champion Infinity Active Smashers	3–1	Fourbees Cavite Patriots Total Attackers	25–21	25–13	23–25	25–19		98–78	
05/12	09:00	Fourbees Cavite Patriots Total Attackers	0–3	Philippine Air Force Air Men	18–25	18–25	20–25			56–75	
05/12	14:00	PLDT Home Ultera Ultra Fast Hitters	3–1	Instituto Estetico Manila Phoenix Volley Masters	25–23	26–28	25–18	25–20		101–89	
05/12	18:00	Cignal HD Spikers	3–0	Champion Infinity Active Smashers	25–22	25–16	25–21			75–59	

== Semifinals ==
Pos	Team	Pld	W	L	Pts	SW	SL	SR	SPW	SPL	SPR	Qualification
1	PLDT Home Ultera Ultra Fast Hitters	3	3	0	8	9	4	2.250	303	281	1.078	Championship series
2	Cagayan Valley Rising Suns	3	2	1	5	7	6	1.167	307	300	1.023	Championship series
3	Cignal HD Spikers	3	1	2	4	6	6	1.000	269	274	0.982	3rd place series
4	Philippine Air Force Air Men	3	0	3	1	3	9	0.333	279	303	0.921	3rd place series

Date	Time		Score		Set 1	Set 2	Set 3	Set 4	Set 5	Total	Report
05/23	03:00	PLDT Home Ultera Ultra Fast Hitters	3–2	Philippine Air Force Air Men	28–26	27–29	25–22	21–25	18–16	119–118	
05/23	05:00	Cagayan Valley Rising Suns	3–2	Cignal HD Spikers	33–35	25–23	16–25	25–21	15–11	114–115	
05/26	02:00	Philippine Air Force Air Men	1–3	Cagayan Valley Rising Suns	29–27	22–25	22–25	21–25		94–102	
05/26	04:00	Cignal HD Spikers	1–3	PLDT Home Ultera Ultra Fast Hitters	25–18	17–25	19–25	11–25		72–93	
05/28	02:00	Philippine Air Force Air Men	0–3	Cignal HD Spikers	27–29	14–25	26–28			67–82	
05/28	04:00	PLDT Home Ultera Ultra Fast Hitters	3–1	Cagayan Valley Rising Suns	16–25	25–23	25–20	25–23		91–91	

== Third place series ==
Date	Time		Score		Set 1	Set 2	Set 3	Set 4	Set 5	Total	Report
24 Sep	12:00	Cignal HD Spikers	2–3	Philippine Air Force Air Men	20–25	25–21	25–16	23–25	12–15	105–102	
24 Sep	12:00	Philippine Air Force Air Men	3–0	Cignal HD Spikers	25–21	25–21	25–20	–	–	75–62	

== Finals ==
Date	Time		Score		Set 1	Set 2	Set 3	Set 4	Set 5	Total	Report
24 Sep	12:00	Cagayan Valley Rising Suns	1–3	PLDT Home Ultera Ultra Fast Hitters	22–25	25–21	23–25	12–25	–	82–96	
24 Sep	12:00	PLDT Home Ultera Ultra Fast Hitters	3–1	Cagayan Valley Rising Suns	25–15	25–11	23–25	30–28	–	103–79	

== Final standings ==
Rank	Team
1st place, gold medalist(s)	PLDT Home Ultera Ultra Fast Hitters
2nd place, silver medalist(s)	Cagayan Valley Rising Suns
3rd place, bronze medalist(s)	Philippine Air Force
4	Cignal HD Spikers
5	Philippine Army Troopers
6	Champion Infinity Active Smashers
7	Fourbees-Cavite Patriots
8	IEM Volley Masters

Spikers' Turf 1st Season Open Conference
PLDT Home Ultera Ultra Fast Hitters

Team roster
Vincent Mangulabnan, Harby Ilano, Juvie Mangaring, Ron Jay Galang, John Paul Torres, Ronaldo Casillan (c), Mark Gil Alfafara, Henry Pecaña, Gilbert Longavela, Armando Malleon, Howard Mojica, Jason Ramos, John Vic de Guzman, Kheeno Franco
Arthur "Odjie" Mamon (Head Coach)
Ariel dela Cruz (Asst Coach)

== Awards ==
Award	Name	Ref.
Conference MVP	Marck Jesus Espejo (CAG)	
Final's MVP	Mark Gil Alfafara (PLDT)	
1st Best Outside Spiker	Marck Jesus Espejo (CAG)	
2nd Best Outside Spiker	John Paul Torres (PLDT)	
1st Best Middle Blocker	Reyson Fuentes (CIG)	
2nd Best Middle Blocker	Peter Den Mar Torres (CAG)	
Best opposite spiker	Mark Gil Alfafara (PLDT)	
Best setter	Jessie Lopez (PAF)	
Best libero	Erickson Joseph Ramos (CAG)	

== See also ==
- 2015 Shakey's V-League Open Conference
