= 2022 PNVF Champions League for Men =

2022 volleyball competition

Tournament details
- Dates: November 5–13, 2022
- Teams: 15
- Venue: PhilSports Arena

Final positions
- Champions: Cignal HD Spikers (1st title)
- Runners-up: Pikit-North Cotabato AMC G-Spikers
- Third place: Imus City–AJAA Spikers
- Fourth place: PGJC Navy Sea Lions

Tournament awards
- MVP: Marck Jesus Espejo (Cignal HD)
- Best Setter: Esmilzo Polvorosa (Imus City-AJAA)
- Best OH: Joshua Umandal (Pikit-North Cotabato AMC); Marck Jesus Espejo (Cignal HD)
- Best MB: John Paul Bugaoan (Cignal HD); Kim Niño Malabunga (Pikit-North Cotabato AMC)
- Best OPP: Joeven Dela Vega (PGJC Navy)
- Best Libero: Manuel Sumanguid III (Cignal HD)

Tournament statistics
- Matches played: 38

The men's division of the 2022 PNVF Champions League began on November 5 to 13, 2022 at PhilSports Arena, Pasig, Philippines. This is the second edition of the PNVF Champions League.

Cignal HD Spikers claimed the championship title after a hard-fought 5 sets against Pikit-North Cotabato AMC G-Spikers. Imus City-AJAA Spikers secured the bronze after a 3 sets win over PGJC Navy Sea Lions.

== Participating teams ==
15 teams entered the 2022 PNVF Champions League.

Club/Team	Sponsor	Locality	Coach	Captain
AIP-University of Baguio-Benguet Province Cardinals	University of Baguio	Benguet	Rey Munar	
Aklan Ati-Atihans	—N/a	Aklan	Reuben Inaudito	Maruel Iverson Tan
Army-Taguig City Troopers	Philippine Army	Taguig	Melvin Carolino	Benjaylo Labide
Bacolod City Tarags	—N/a	Bacolod	Ralph Savellano	
Baguio City Highlanders	—N/a	Baguio	Sherry Ann Floresca	
Basilan-Tennun Spikers	Anak Mindanao	Basilan	Hji Mai Hajan	
Cignal HD Spikers	Cignal TV, Inc.	—N/a	Dexter Clamor	Ysrael Wilson Marasigan
Imus City–AJAA Spikers	—N/a	Imus	Sinfronio Acaylar	Ish Polvorosa
NU-Pasay City Bulldogs	National University	Pasay	Dante Alinsunurin	Angelo Nicolas Almendras
One Bulacan Republicans	—N/a	Bulacan	Gian Gonzales	
PGJC Navy Sea Lions	Philippine Navy	—N/a	Cecille Cruzada	Gregorio Dolor
Pikit-North Cotabato AMC G-Spikers	—N/a	Pikit, Cotabato	Arthur Mamon	Jayvee Sumagaysay
Santa Rosa City Lions	—N/a	Santa Rosa, Laguna	Edward Lirio	Chris Emmanuel Hernandez
UE-Cherrylume Red Warriors	University of the East; Mileage Asia Corporation	—N/a	Jerome Guhit	
VNS-Quezon City Griffins	VNS Management Group	Quezon City	Ralph Ocampo	John Benedict San Andres

== Format ==
The following format will be conducted for the entirety of the conference:

Preliminary Round

1. Single-round robin preliminaries; 15 teams; 3 pools; Teams are ranked using the FIVB Ranking System.
2. The top two teams in each pool and the top two of the third placed teams qualified for the final round

Quarterfinal round

1. QF1: #A1 vs. 2nd best #3
2. QF2: #C2 vs. #B2
3. QF3: #B1 vs. 1st best #3
4. QF4: #C1 vs. #A2

Semifinal round

1. QF1 winner vs. QF2 winner
2. QF3 winner vs. QF4 winner

Finals

1. Bronze medal: SF1 Loser vs SF2 Loser
2. Gold medal: SF1 Winner vs SF2 Winner

== Venue ==
All matches
Pasig
PhilSports Arena
Capacity: 10,000
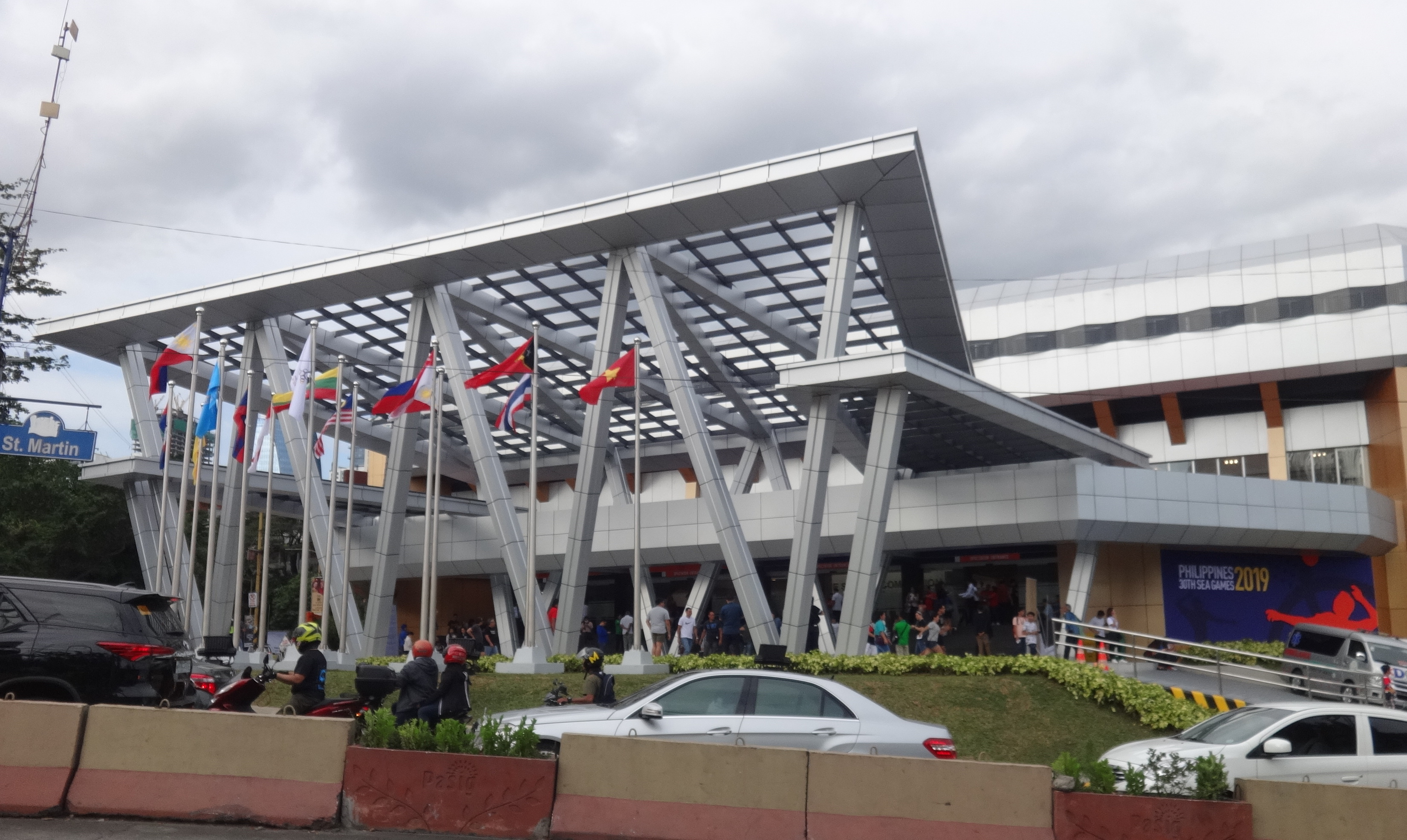

== Pools composition ==
The 15 teams were divided into 5 teams in each pool.

Pool A	Pool B	Pool C
PGJC Navy Sea Lions	Aklan Ati-Atihans	UE-Cherrylume Red Warriors
Basilan-Tennun Spikers	Imus City-AJAA Spikers	Baguio City Highlanders
Cignal HD Spikers	NU-Pasay City Bulldogs	Bacolod City Tarags
VNS-Quezon City Griffins	One Bulacan Republicans	Santa Rosa City Lions
AIP-University of Baguio-Benguet Province Cardinals	Pikit-North Cotabato AMC G Spikers	Army-Taguig City Troopers

== Preliminary round ==
- All times are Philippine Standard Time (UTC+8:00).

=== Pool A ===
Pos	Team	Pld	W	L	Pts	SW	SL	SR	SPW	SPL	SPR	Qualification
1	PGJC Navy Sea Lions	4	4	0	12	12	2	6.000	339	277	1.224	Quarterfinals
2	Cignal HD Spikers	4	3	1	9	10	6	1.667	379	312	1.215	Quarterfinals
3	VNS-Quezon City Griffins	4	2	2	5	7	8	0.875	297	310	0.958	
4	Basilan-Tennun Spikers	4	1	3	4	6	9	0.667	292	334	0.874	
5	AIP-University of Baguio-Benguet Province Cardinals	4	0	4	0	2	12	0.167	264	338	0.781	

Date	Time		Score		Set 1	Set 2	Set 3	Set 4	Set 5	Total	Report
5 Nov	08:00	Basilan-Tennun Spikers	3–0	AIP-Benguet Province Cardinals	25–17	25–23	25–19			75–59	
5 Nov	10:00	Cignal HD Spikers	3–1	VNS-Quezon City Griffins	22–25	25–12	25–15	25–17		97–69	
5 Nov	20:00	AIP-Benguet Province Cardinals	1–3	PGJC Navy Sea Lions	13–25	16–25	25–20	22–25		76–95	
7 Nov	10:00	Basilan-Tennun Spikers	1–3	Cignal HD Spikers	18–25	25–21	11–25	12–25		66–96	
7 Nov	12:00	VNS-Quezon City Griffins	0–3	PGJC Navy Sea Lions	15–25	14–25	20–25			49–75	
8 Nov	16:00	Cignal HD Spikers	3–1	AIP-Benguet Province Cardinals	25–21	18–25	25–20	25–17		93–83	
8 Nov	18:00	VNS-Quezon City Griffins	3–2	Basilan-Tennun Spikers	25–16	19–25	25–13	20–25	15–13	104–92	
9 Nov	17:00	PGJC Navy Sea Lions	3–1	Cignal HD Spikers	18–25	26–24	25–23	25–21		94–93	
10 Nov	14:00	AIP-Benguet Province Cardinals	0–3	VNS-Quezon City Griffins	15–25	17–25	14–25			46–75	
10 Nov	16:00	PGJC Navy Sea Lions	3–0	Basilan-Tennun Spikers	25–22	25–14	25–23			75–59	

=== Pool B ===
Pos	Team	Pld	W	L	Pts	SW	SL	SR	SPW	SPL	SPR	Qualification
1	NU-Pasay City Bulldogs	4	4	0	12	12	1	12.000	327	252	1.298	Quarterfinals
2	Pikit-North Cotabato AMC G-Spikers	4	3	1	9	9	4	2.250	303	254	1.193	Quarterfinals
3	Imus City-AJAA Spikers	4	2	2	6	8	6	1.333	324	297	1.091	Quarterfinals
4	One Bulacan Republicans	4	1	3	3	3	9	0.333	245	259	0.946	
5	Aklan Ati-Atihans	4	0	4	0	0	12	0.000	184	300	0.613	

Date	Time		Score		Set 1	Set 2	Set 3	Set 4	Set 5	Total	Report
5 Nov	12:00	Imus City-AJAA Spikers	1–3	Pikit-North Cotabato AMC G-Spikers	22–25	25–20	20–25	18–25		85–95	
5 Nov	14:00	NU-Pasay City Bulldogs	3–0	One Bulacan Republicans	25–19	25–20	25–22			75–61	
6 Nov	16:30	Pikit-North Cotabato AMC G-Spikers	3–0	Aklan Ati-Atihans	25–10	25–13	25–17			75–40	
6 Nov	18:30	One Bulacan Republicans	0–3	Imus City-AJAA Spikers	14–25	22–25	19–25			55–75	
8 Nov	08:00	One Bulacan Republicans	3–0	Aklan Ati-Atihans	25–15	25–22	25–18			75–55	
8 Nov	10:00	Pikit-North Cotabato AMC G-Spikers	0–3	NU-Pasay City Bulldogs	16–25	22–25	20–25			58–75	
8 Nov	20:00	NU-Pasay City Bulldogs	3–1	Imus City-AJAA Spikers	25–23	25–27	25–14	27–25		102–89	
9 Nov	19:00	Aklan Ati-Atihans	0–3	NU-Pasay City Bulldogs	13–25	16–25	15–25			44–75	
10 Nov	10:00	One Bulacan Republicans	0–3	Pikit-North Cotabato AMC G-Spikers	21–25	18–25	15–25			54–75	
10 Nov	12:00	Imus City-AJAA Spikers	3–0	Aklan Ati-Atihans	25–20	25–10	25–15			75–45	

=== Pool C ===
Pos	Team	Pld	W	L	Pts	SW	SL	SR	SPW	SPL	SPR	Qualification
1	Bacolod City Tarags	4	4	0	11	12	3	4.000	357	290	1.231	Quarterfinals
2	Army-Taguig City Troopers	4	3	1	9	11	5	2.200	353	333	1.060	Quarterfinals
3	Santa Rosa City Lions	4	2	2	5	6	8	0.750	314	318	0.987	Quarterfinals
4	UE-Cherrylume Red Warriors	4	1	3	4	8	11	0.727	392	405	0.968	
5	Baguio City Highlanders	4	0	4	1	2	12	0.167	276	346	0.798	

Date	Time		Score		Set 1	Set 2	Set 3	Set 4	Set 5	Total	Report
5 Nov	16:00	Baguio City Highlanders	0–3	Army-Taguig City Troopers	23–25	26–28	19–25			68–78	
5 Nov	18:00	Bacolod City Tarags	3–0	Santa Rosa City Lions	30–28	25–22	25–23			80–73	
6 Nov	20:30	Army-Taguig City Troopers	3–2	UE-Cherrylume Red Warriors	22–25	25–18	19–25	25–20	15–13	106–101	
7 Nov	08:00	Baguio City Highlanders	0–3	Bacolod City Tarags	14–25	12–25	21–25			47–75	
8 Nov	12:00	UE-Cherrylume Red Warriors	2–3	Santa Rosa City Lions	25–22	22–25	25–22	22–25	6–15	100–109	
8 Nov	14:00	Bacolod City Tarags	3–2	Army-Taguig City Troopers	25–23	21–25	25–17	25–18	15–10	111–93	
9 Nov	13:00	Bacolod City Tarags	3–1	UE-Cherrylume Red Warriors	25–17	25–17	16–25	25–18		91–77	
9 Nov	15:00	Santa Rosa City Lions	3–0	Baguio City Highlanders	29–27	25–23	25–12			79–62	
9 Nov	21:00	Army-Taguig City Troopers	3–0	Santa Rosa City Lions	25–12	26–24	25–17			76–53	
10 Nov	08:00	UE-Cherrylume Red Warriors	3–2	Baguio City Highlanders	25–20	25–14	25–27	24–26	15–12	114–99	

=== Ranking of the third placed teams ===
Pos	Grp	Team	Pld	W	L	Pts	SW	SL	SR	SPW	SPL	SPR	Qualification
1	B	Imus City-AJAA Spikers	4	2	2	6	8	6	1.333	324	297	1.091	Quarterfinals
2	A	VNS-Quezon City Griffins	4	2	2	5	7	8	0.875	297	310	0.958	Quarterfinals
3	C	Santa Rosa City Lions	4	2	2	5	6	8	0.750	314	318	0.987	

== Final round ==
- All times are Philippines Standard Time (UTC+08:00)

Quarterfinals
November 11
PGJC Navy Sea Lions	3
Santa Rosa City Lions	0
November 11
Army-Taguig City Troopers	0
Pikit-North Cotabato AMC G-Spikers	3
November 11
NU-Pasay City Bulldogs	1
Imus City-AJAA Spikers	3
November 11
Bacolod City Tarags	2
Cignal HD Spikers	3

Semifinals
November 12
PGJC Navy Sea Lions	2
Pikit-North Cotabato AMC G-Spikers	3
November 12
Imus City-AJAA Spikers	0
Cignal HD Spikers	3

Championship
November 13
Pikit-North Cotabato AMC G-Spikers	2
Cignal HD Spikers	3
3rd place match
November 13
PGJC Navy Sea Lions	0
Imus-AJAA Spikers	3

=== Quarterfinals ===
Date	Time		Score		Set 1	Set 2	Set 3	Set 4	Set 5	Total	Report
11 Nov	13:00	PGJC Navy Sea Lions	3–0	Santa Rosa City Lions	25–13	25–16	25–21			75–50	
11 Nov	15:00	Army-Taguig City Troopers	0–3	Pikit-North Cotabato AMC G-Spikers	23–25	21–25	21–25			65–75	
11 Nov	17:00	NU-Pasay City Bulldogs	1–3	Imus City-AJAA Spikers	25–20	22–25	23–25	17–25		87–95	
11 Nov	19:00	Bacolod City Tarags	2–3	Cignal HD Spikers	23–25	25–21	25–16	16–25	11–15	100–102	

=== Semifinals ===
Date	Time		Score		Set 1	Set 2	Set 3	Set 4	Set 5	Total	Report
12 Nov	17:30	PGJC Navy Sea Lions	2–3	Pikit-North Cotabato AMC G-Spikers	15–25	25–20	25–22	26–28	11–15	102–110	
12 Nov	19:30	Imus City-AJAA Spikers	0–3	Cignal HD Spikers	23–25	21–25	19–25			63–75	

=== 3rd place match ===
Date	Time		Score		Set 1	Set 2	Set 3	Set 4	Set 5	Total	Report
13 Nov	10:00	PGJC Navy Sea Lions	0–3	Imus City-AJAA Spikers	16–25	22–25	32–34			70–84	

=== Championship ===
Date	Time		Score		Set 1	Set 2	Set 3	Set 4	Set 5	Total	Report
13 Nov	17:30	Pikit-North Cotabato AMC G-Spikers	2–3	Cignal HD Spikers	23–25	25–21	19–25	25–21	12–15	104–107	

== Final standing ==
Rank	Team
1st place, gold medalist(s)	Cignal HD Spikers
2nd place, silver medalist(s)	Pikit-North Cotabato AMC G-Spikers
3rd place, bronze medalist(s)	Imus City-AJAA Spikers
4	PGJC Navy Sea Lions
5	NU-Pasay City Bulldogs
6	Bacolod City Tarags
7	Army-Taguig City Troopers
8	Santa Rosa City Lions
9	VNS-Quezon City Griffins
10	UE-Cherrylume Red Warriors
11	Basilan-Tennun Spikers
12	One Bulacan Republicans
13	Baguio City Highlanders
14	AIP-University of Baguio-Benguet Province Cardinals
15	Aklan Ati-Atihans

2022 PNVF Champions League for Men Champions

1st title

== Awards ==
=== Individual awards ===
Award	Player	Team	Ref.
Most Valuable Player	Marck Jesus Espejo	Cignal	
1st Best Outside Spiker	Joshua Umandal	Pikit-North Cotabato	
2nd Best Outside Spiker	Marck Jesus Espejo	Cignal	
1st Best Middle Blocker	John Paul Bugaoan	Cignal	
2nd Best Middle Blocker	Kim Niño Malabunga	Pikit-North Cotabato	
Best Opposite Spiker	Joeven Dela Vega	PGJC Navy	
Best Setter	Esmilzo Polvorosa	Imus City-AJAA	
Best Libero	Manuel Sumanguid III	Cignal	

== See also ==
- 2022 PNVF Champions League for Women
