= 2019 Spikers' Turf season =

- League: Spikers' Turf
- Sport: Volleyball
- Duration: May 19 – October 22, 2019
- TV partner: One Sports

Conferences
- Reinforced champions: Cignal HD Spikers
- Reinforced runners-up: Philippine Air Force Jet Spikers
- Open champions: Cignal HD Spikers
- Open runners-up: Go for Gold-Air Force

Spiker's Turf seasons
- ← 2018 2022 →

The 2019 Spikers' Turf season was the fifth season of Spikers' Turf and first following its spin-off from the Premier Volleyball League. The season ran from May 19 to October 22, 2019. This season only had two conferences with the Collegiate Conference not held.

The Reinforced Conference was the season-opening conference while the Open Conference was the season-ending conference.

== Reinforced conference ==
The 2019 Spikers’ Turf Reinforced Conference was the thirteenth conference of the Spikers' Turf. The tournament began on May 19, 2019 at the Paco Arena.

=== Participating teams ===
2019 Spikers’ Turf Reinforced Conference
Abbr.	Team	Affiliation	Colors	Head coach	Team Captain
ANM	Animo Green Blazing Spikers	De La Salle University / De La Salle–College of Saint Benilde		Aaron Velez	Kevin Magsino
CIG	Cignal HD Spikers	Cignal TV, Inc.		Dexter Clamor	Ysrael Wilson Marasigan
ESY	Easy Trip–Raimol	Easytrip Services Corporation Philippines and Rainchem International, Inc.		Jose Roque	Red Christensen
IEM	IEM Phoenix Volley Masters	Instituto Estetico Manila		Pathie Jamiri	Michael Conde
PAF	Philippine Air Force Jet Spikers	Philippine Air Force		Rhovyl Verayo	Pitrus De Ocampo
PAR	Philippine Army Troopers	Philippine Army		Rico de Guzman	Patrick John Rojas
PCG	Philippine Coast Guard Dolphins	Philippine Coast Guard		Jeffrey Dela Cruz	Al-frazin Abdulwahab
PHI	Rebisco-Philippines	Philippines men's national volleyball team / Republic Biscuit Corporation		Dante Alinsunurin	John Vic De Guzman
PLD	PLDT Home Fibr Power Hitters	Philippine Long Distance Telephone Company		Arthur Mamon	Henry James Pecaña
PNV	Philippine Navy Sea Lions	Philippine Navy		Edgardo Rusit	Relan Taneo
STE	Sta. Elena Ball Hammers	Sta. Elena Construction and Development Corporation		Dante Alinsunurin	Edward Camposano
VNS	VNS Griffins	Cafe Lupe Hostel & Restaurant		Ralph Ocampo	Guel Asia

=== Preliminary round ===
Pos	Team	Pld	W	L	Pts	SW	SL	SR	SPW	SPL	SPR	Qualification
1	Cignal HD Spikers	11	10	1	30	31	4	7.750	859	660	1.302	Final round
2	Philippine Air Force Jet Spikers	11	10	1	26	30	14	2.143	1011	924	1.094	Final round
3	PLDT Power Hitters	11	8	3	25	27	12	2.250	893	811	1.101	Final round
4	Philippine National Team	11	8	3	24	28	14	2.000	997	859	1.161	
5	Sta. Elena Ball Hammers	11	7	4	20	24	17	1.412	971	948	1.024	Final round
6	Philippine Army Troopers	11	6	5	14	19	25	0.760	897	984	0.912	
7	Philippine Navy Sea Lions	11	5	6	18	21	23	0.913	966	968	0.998	
8	Animo Green Spikers	11	5	6	13	20	26	0.769	980	1037	0.945	
9	IEM Volley Masters	11	4	7	13	19	25	0.760	979	1016	0.964	
10	VNS Griffins	11	2	9	9	14	28	0.500	951	1004	0.947	
11	Easy Trip–Raimol	11	1	10	4	11	32	0.344	865	1007	0.859	
12	Philippine Coast Guard Dolphins	11	0	11	2	9	33	0.273	846	997	0.849	

=== Final round ===
- All series are best-of-three.

Semifinals
1	Cignal HD Spikers	3	2	3
5	Sta. Elena Ball Hammers	0	3	2
2	Philippine Air Force Jet Spikers	3	2	3
3	PLDT Power Hitters	2	3	0

Finals
Cignal HD Spikers	3	3	–
Philippine Air Force Jet Spikers	1	2	–
3rd place
PLDT Power Hitters	3	2	–
Sta. Elena Ball Hammers	1	3	–

=== Awards ===
Award		Player	Ref.
Most Valuable Player	Finals	Marck Espejo (Cignal)	
Most Valuable Player	Conference	Alnakran Abdilla (Air Force)	
Best Outside Spikers	1st: 2nd:	Alnakran Abdilla (Air Force); Marck Espejo (Cignal)	
Best Middle Blockers	1st: 2nd:	Berhashidin Daymil (Sta. Elena); Kim Malabunga (Air Force)	
Best Opposite Spiker		John Vic De Guzman (PLDT)	
Best Setter		Vince Mangulabnan (Cignal)	
Best Libero		Manuel Sumanguid III (Cignal)	

=== Final standings ===
Rank	Team
1st place, gold medalist(s)	Cignal HD Spikers
2nd place, silver medalist(s)	Philippine Air Force Jet Spikers
3rd place, bronze medalist(s)	PLDT Power Hitters
4	Sta. Elena Ball Hammers
5	Philippine Army Troopers
6	Philippine Navy Sea Lions
7	Animo Green Blazing Spikers
8	IEM Phoenix Volley Masters
9	VNS Griffins
10	Easy Trip–Raimol
11	Philippine Coast Guard Dolphins

== Open conference ==
The 2019 Spikers’ Turf Open Conference was the fourteenth conference of the Spikers' Turf. The tournament began on August 20, 2019 with a total of 24 teams. San Beda replaced PNP, which was forced to withdraw from the competition after failing to secure permission from their superior officers.

A total of four pools with six squads each pool that will compete in a single-round robin elimination round.

=== Participating teams ===
2019 Spikers’ Turf Open Conference – Pool A
Abbr.	Team	Company/sponsor	Colors	Head coach	Team Captain
ADU	Adamson Soaring Falcons	Adamson University		Domingo Custodio	Leo Miranda
CIG	Cignal HD Spikers	Cignal TV, Inc.		Dexter Clamor	Ysrael Wilson Marasigan
EAC	EAC Generals	Emilio Aguinaldo College		Rodrigo Palmero	Ralph Joshua Pitogo
IEM	IEM Phoenix Volley Masters	Instituto Estetico Manila		Pathie Jamiri	Leonel Evan Laraya
NCBA	NCBA Wildcats	National College of Business and Arts		Ernesto Balubar Jr.	Cj Oclima
VNS	VNS Griffins	VNS Management Group		Ralph Ocampo	Guel Asia

2019 Spikers’ Turf Open Conference – Pool B
Abbr.	Team	Company/sponsor	Colors	Head coach	Team Captain
ADMU	Ateneo Blue Eagles	Ateneo de Manila University		Timothy James Sto. Tomas	Jasper Rodney Tan
CEU	CEU Scorpions	Centro Escolar University		Mark Anthony Santos	Niño Nazareno
DLSU	ECO Oil–La Salle Green Archers	ECO Oil Ltd.–De La Salle University		Arnold Laniog	Wayne Ferdi Marco
ESY	Easy Trip–Raimol	Easytrip Services Corporation Philippines and Rainchem International, Inc.		Jose Roque	Red Christensen
LPU	Lyceum Pirates	Lyceum of the Philippines University		Emil Lontoc	Miko Binas
PAF	Go for Gold–Air Force	Philippine Air Force / Go For Gold		Dante Alinsunurin	Jessie Lopez

2019 Spikers’ Turf Open Conference – Pool C
Abbr.	Team	Company/sponsor	Colors	Head coach	Team Captain
FEU	Hachiran–FEU Tamaraws	Far Eastern University		Reynaldo Diaz Jr.	Owen Suarez
PAR	Philippine Army Troopers	Philippine Army		Rico de Guzman	Randy Fallorina
PCG	Philippine Coast Guard Dolphins	Philippine Coast Guard		Jeffrey Dela Cruz	Al-frazin Abdulwahab
PLDT	PLDT Home Fibr Power Hitters	Philippine Long Distance Telephone Company		Arthur Mamon	John Vic De Guzman
SSC-R	San Sebastian Stags	San Sebastian College – Recoletos		Clint Malazo	John Timothy Eusebio
UPHSD	Perpetual Altas	University of Perpetual Help System DALTA		Sinfronio Acaylar	Ridzuan Muhali

2019 Spikers’ Turf Open Conference – Pool D
Abbr.	Team	Company/sponsor	Colors	Head coach	Team Captain
AU	Arellano Chiefs	Arellano University		Sherwin Meneses	Christian Joshua Segovia
MU	Mapúa Cardinals	Mapúa University		Paul Jan Dolorias	Reje Emmanuel Hizon
SBU	San Beda Red Lions	San Beda University		Alegro Carpio	Mark Lorenze Santos
PNV	Philippine Navy Sea Lions	Philippine Navy		Edgardo Rusit	Relan Taneo
NU	Sta. Elena-NU Bulldogs	Sta. Elena Construction and Development Corporation		Ariel Dela Cruz	James Martin Nativdad
UST	UST Growling Tigers	University of Santo Tomas		Arthur Alan Mamon	Manuel Andrei Medina

=== Preliminary round ===
Pool A

Pos	Team	Pld	W	L	Pts	SW	SL	SR	SPW	SPL	SPR	Qualification
1	Cignal HD Spikers	5	5	0	15	15	2	7.500	439	316	1.389	Quarterfinals
2	IEM Phoenix Volley Masters	5	4	1	11	13	7	1.857	460	436	1.055	Quarterfinals
3	VNS Griffins	5	3	2	8	10	10	1.000	430	456	0.943	
4	Adamson Soaring Falcons	5	2	3	7	11	11	1.000	456	475	0.960	
5	EAC Generals	5	1	4	4	7	12	0.583	421	424	0.993	
6	NCBA Wildcats	5	0	5	0	1	15	0.067	305	404	0.755	

Pool B

Pos	Team	Pld	W	L	Pts	SW	SL	SR	SPW	SPL	SPR	Qualification
1	Go for Gold-Air Force	5	5	0	13	15	5	3.000	469	369	1.271	Quarterfinals
2	Ateneo Blue Eagles	5	4	1	11	14	8	1.750	481	444	1.083	Quarterfinals
3	ECO Oil-La Salle Green Archers	5	3	2	11	13	8	1.625	470	418	1.124	
4	Easy Trip-Raimol	5	2	3	7	10	10	1.000	470	418	1.124	
5	Lyceum Pirates	5	1	4	3	6	13	0.462	376	443	0.849	
6	CEU Scorpions	5	0	5	0	1	15	0.067	292	393	0.743	

Pool C

Pos	Team	Pld	W	L	Pts	SW	SL	SR	SPW	SPL	SPR	Qualification
1	Perpetual Altas	5	5	0	15	15	3	5.000	445	376	1.184	Quarterfinals
2	PLDT Power Hitters	5	4	1	11	13	5	2.600	427	361	1.183	Quarterfinals
3	Hachiran-FEU Tamaraws	5	3	2	10	12	6	2.000	425	372	1.142	
4	Philippine Army Troopers	5	1	4	4	5	12	0.417	352	396	0.889	
5	San Sebastian Stags	5	1	4	3	3	13	0.231	333	395	0.843	
6	Coast Guard Dolphins	5	1	4	2	5	14	0.357	356	438	0.813	

Pool D

Pos	Team	Pld	W	L	Pts	SW	SL	SR	SPW	SPL	SPR	Qualification
1	Sta. Elena Ball Hammers	5	5	0	14	15	3	5.000	428	338	1.266	Quarterfinals
2	Philippine Navy Sea Lions	5	4	1	13	14	3	4.667	410	345	1.188	Quarterfinals
3	UST Growling Tigers	5	2	3	6	9	12	0.750	460	473	0.973	
4	Arellano Chiefs	5	2	3	5	7	11	0.636	365	418	0.873	
5	Mapúa Cardinals	5	2	3	5	7	12	0.583	395	426	0.927	
6	San Beda Red Lions	5	0	5	2	4	15	0.267	378	436	0.867	

=== Final round ===
Quarterfinals * – twice to beat advantage
Cignal HD Spikers*	3	–	–
Ateneo Blue Eagles	0	–	–
Perpetual Altas*	3	–	–
Philippine Navy Sea Lions	2	–	–
Go for Gold-Air Force*	3	–	–
PLDT Power Hitters	1	–	–
Sta. Elena-NU Ball Hammers*	0	3	–
IEM Phoenix Volley Masters	3	2	–

Semifinals best of three
Cignal HD Spikers	3	3	–
Perpetual Altas	0	0	–
Go for Gold-Air Force	2	3	3
Sta. Elena-NU Ball Hammers	3	1	1

Championship best of three
Cignal HD Spikers	3	3	–
Go for Gold-Air Force	2	2	–
Third place
Perpetual Altas	1	0	–
Sta. Elena-NU Ball Hammers	3	3	–

=== Awards ===
Award		Player	Ref.
Most Valuable Player	Finals	Marck Espejo (Cignal)	
Most Valuable Player	Conference	Ysay Marasigan (Cignal)	
Best Outside Spikers	1st: 2nd:	Ran Abdilla (Air Force); Marck Espejo (Cignal)	
Best Middle Blockers	1st: 2nd:	Francis Saura (Air Force); Anjo Pertierra (Cignal)	
Best Opposite Spiker		Ysay Marasigan (Cignal)	
Best Setter		Joshua Retamar (Sta. Elena-NU)	
Best Libero		Ricky Marcos (Sta. Elena-NU)	

=== Final standings ===
Rank	Team
1st place, gold medalist(s)	Cignal HD Spikers
2nd place, silver medalist(s)	Go for Gold-Air Force
3rd place, bronze medalist(s)	Sta. Elena-NU Ball Hammers
4	Perpetual Altas
5	Philippine Navy Sea Lions
6	PLDT Home Fibr Power Hitters
7	IEM Phoenix Volley Masters
8	Ateneo Blue Eagles
9	ECO Oil-La Salle Green Archers
10	Hachiran-FEU Tamaraws
11	VNS Griffins
12	Easy Trip-Raimol
13	Adamson Soaring Falcons
14	UST Growling Tigers
15	Arellano Chiefs
16	Mapúa Cardinals
17	Philippine Army Troopers
18	EAC Generals
19	Lyceum Pirates
20	San Sebastian Stags
21	Coast Guard Dolphins
22	San Beda Red Lions
23	NCBA Wildcats
24	CEU Scorpions

== See also ==
- 2019 Premier Volleyball League season
