= Basilan Steel Spikers =

Men's volleyball team from Basilan, Philippines

- Full name: Basilan Steel Spikers Amin–Anak Mindanao
- Nickname: Steel Spikers
- Founded: 2021

The Basilan Steel Spikers, also known as the Basilan Steel Spikers Amin–Anak Mindanao due to sponsorship of Anak Mindanao, are a men's volleyball team based in Basilan which have competed in the PNVF Champions League.

== History ==
The Basilan Steel Spikers are an offshoot of the Basilan Peace Riders, a basketball team which competed in the Maharlika Pilipinas Basketball League. The Spikers were formed in 2021 with the backing of Basilan politician Mujiv S. Hataman and the Anak Mindanao partylist. The team was formed to promote the province of Basilan. It entered its first tournament, the 2021 PNVF Champions League. Failing to win a game, they finished last in the tournament.

== Records ==
2021 PNVF Champions League

Season	Placement
2021	7th place
