= Madz Gampong =

Filipino volleyball player (born 1995)

Madzlan Gampong

Personal information
- Nickname: Madz
- Nationality: Filipino
- Born: March 18, 1995 (age 31)
- Hometown: Simunul, Tawi-Tawi
- Height: 1.80 m (5 ft 11 in)
- Education: National University

Volleyball information
- Position: Outside hitter
- Current club: Savouge Spin Doctors
- Number: 9

Career
Years	Teams
2021	Team Dasma Monarchs
2022	Sarawak Hornbill
2023	AMC Cotabato Spikers
2024	Cignal HD Spikers
2025–present	Savouge Spin Doctors

Madzlan Gampong born (March 18, 1995) is a Filipino volleyball player who plays for Savouge Spin Doctors of the Spikers' Turf.

== Career ==
=== College ===
A native of Simunul, Tawi-Tawi, Gampong played for the National University (NU) NU Bulldogs volleyball team at the University Athletic Association of the Philippines (UAAP). He was the topscorer for the Bulldogs in UAAP Season 77. At the start of UAAP Season 80, Gampong was a frequently part of the bench until he was fielded as a starter in the game against the Ateneo Blue Eagles which also marked as the end of NU's losing streak against Ateneo since Season 76.

=== Club ===
==== Team Dasma Monarchs ====
Gampong played for Team Dasma Monarchs in the 2021 PNVF Champions League. He helped the Monarchs clinch the inaugural men's title.

==== Sarawak Hornbill ====
Madzlan Gampong was signed in to play for the Sarawak Hornbill at 2022 Malaysia Volleyball League (MVL) Championships as one of the club's foreign players. He got recommended by fellow Filipino and signee Jayvee Sumagaysay since the club needed an outside hitter.

== Clubs ==
- (Philippines) Team Dasma Monarchs (2021–2022)
- (Malaysia) Sarawak Hornbill (2022–2023)
- (Philippines) AMC Cotabato Spikers (2023–2024)
- (Philippines) Cignal HD Spikers (2024–2025)
- (Philippines) Savouge Spin Doctors (2025–present)
