= Philippine Air Force Air Spikers =

Men's volleyball team of the Philippine Air Force

- Full name: Go for Gold - Philippine Air Force Air Spikers
- Short name: PAF
- Nickname: Aguilas/ Jet/Air Spikers/Airmen
- Head coach: Jeffrey Malabanan
- Captain: Rodolfo Labrador (FEU)
- League: Spikers' Turf
- 2024 Open: 8th place
- Championships: 3 - Spikers' Turf, 1 - PVL

Uniforms
Home	Away

The Philippine Air Force Air Spikers (also known as the Philippine Air Force Aguilas) represents the Philippine Air Force in men's volleyball competitions.

== Current roster ==
Philippine Air Force Airmen
Number	Player	Position
1	Ralph Christian Calasin	Middle Blocker
2	Jann Paulo Ancheta	Universal
3	Darwin Dizon	Outside Hitter
4	John Philip Nuñez	Libero
5	Pol Gringo Salvador	Outside Hitter
6	Ronchette Lee Villegas	Setter
7	Rodolfo Labrador Jr. (C)	Outside Hitter
8	Louis Emmanuel Lumanlan	Middle Blocker
9	Herald Domingo	Middle Blocker
10	Mabel Jesus Banac	Libero
11	Alnakran Abdilla	Outside Hitter
12	Bryan James Jaleco	Outside Hitter
15	Primo Enrique Rueca	Outside Hitter
16	Marco Ely Maclang	Libero
17	Ahmad Fajani Abdul	Opposite Hitter
18	Edwin Tolentino	Outside Hitter
19	Pitrus Paolo De Ocampo	Setter
20	Joshua Serrano	Middle Blocker
24	James Buytrago	Middle Blocker
25	Derick Lerry Delizo	Middle Blocker

- Head coach: Jeffrey Malabanan
- Assistant coach: Jessie Lopez

== Honors ==
=== Team ===
Spikers' Turf / Premier Volleyball League:

Season	Conference	Title	Source
2015	Open	3rd place	
2015	Reinforced	Runner-up	
2016	Open	Champions	
2016	Reinforced	Champions	
2017 (Note: – with the Premier Volleyball League)	Reinforced	Runner-up	
2017	Open	3rd place	
2018	Reinforced	Champions	
2018	Open	Champions	
2019	Reinforced	Runner-up	
2019	Open	Runner-up	
2022	Open	did not compete	
2023	Open	9th place	
2023	Invitational	18th place	
2024	Open	8th place	

PNVF:

Season	Placement	Source
2021	Runner-up	
2024	8th place	

=== Individual ===
Spikers' Turf / Premier Volleyball League:

Season	Conference	Award	Name	Ref.
2015	Open	Best Setter	Jessie Lopez	
2015	Reinforced	Best Opposite Spiker	Reuben Inaudito	
2015	Reinforced	2nd Best Middle Blocker	Reyson Fuentes	
2016	Open	Most Valuable Player (Finals)	Fauzi Ismail	
2016	Open	2nd Best Outside Spiker	Fauzi Ismail	
2016	Open	Best Setter	Jessie Lopez	
2016	Open	Best Opposite Spiker	Rudolfo Labrador	
2016	Reinforced	Most Valuable Player (Conference)	Howard Mojica	
2016	Reinforced	1st Best Outside Spiker	Howard Mojica	
2016	Reinforced	Most Valuable Player (Finals)	Bryan Bagunas	
2016	Reinforced	Best Setter	Jessie Lopez	
2017	Reinforced	Most Valuable Player (Conference)	Alnakran Abdilla	
2017	Reinforced	2nd Best Outside Spiker	Fauzi Ismail	
2017	Open	1st Best Outside Spiker	Edwin Tolentino	
2018	Reinforced	2nd Best Outside Spiker	Fauzi Ismail	
2018	Reinforced	Most Valuable Player (Finals)	Bryan Bagunas	
2018	Open	1st Best Outside Spiker	Alnakran Abdilla	
2018	Open	Most Valuable Player (Finals)	Alnakran Abdilla	
2019	Reinforced	1st Best Outside Spiker	Alnakran Abdilla	
2019	Reinforced	Most Valuable Player (Conference)	Alnakran Abdilla	
2019	Reinforced	2nd Best Middle Blocker	Kim Malabunga	
2019	Open	1st Best Outside Spiker	Alnakran Abdilla	
2019	Open	1st Best Middle Blocker	Francis Saura	

PNVF:

Season	Award	Name	Source
2021	2nd Best Outside Spiker	Mark Alfafara	
2021	Best Opposite Spiker	John Vic De Guzman	
2021	Best Libero	Ricky Marcos	

== Team captains ==
- (Philippines) Jessie Lopez (2015, 2017, 2018, 2019, 2023)
- (Philippines) Mark Carlo Pangan (2016)
- (Philippines) Jeffrey Malabanan (2016)
- (Philippines) Pitrus de Ocampo (2019)
- (Philippines) Rodolfo Labrador (2023, 2024)

== Coaches ==
- (Philippines) Rhovyl Verayo (2015 – 2022)
- (Philippines) Raffy Mosuela (2023)
- (Philippines) Jhimson Merza (2023)
- (Philippines) Jeffrey Malabanan (2024)

== See also ==
- Philippine Air Force Lady Jet Spikers
