= 2021 PNVF Champions League for Men =

Volleyball tournament

Tournament details
- Dates: November 29 – December 4, 2021
- Teams: 7
- Venue: Aquamarine Gym

Final positions
- Champions: Team Dasma Monarchs (1st title)
- Runners-up: Go for Gold-Air Force Aguilas
- Third place: Manileño Spikers
- Fourth place: Global Remit

Tournament awards
- MVP: Mark Calado (Team Dasma Monarchs)
- Best Setter: Kris Silang (Team Dasma Monarchs)
- Best OH: Mark Calado (Team Dasma Monarchs); Mark Alfafara (Go for Gold-Air Force Aguilas)
- Best MB: Jayvee Sumagaysay (Team Dasma Monarchs); Rwenzmel Taguibolos (Manileño Spikers)
- Best OPP: Johnvic De Guzman (Go for Gold-Air Force Aguilas)
- Best Libero: Ricky Marcos (Go for Gold-Air Force Aguilas)

Tournament statistics
- Matches played: 15

The men's division of the 2021 PNVF Champions League was held from November 29 to December 4, 2021. This is the inaugural edition of the PNVF Champions League. The winner of this tournament will be the country's representative to the Asian Men's Club Volleyball Championships in May next year.

== Participating teams ==
Seven teams entered the 2021 PNVF Champions League. Four teams (Basilan, MRT-Negros, Sabong International, and Team Dasma) are provincial teams.

Club	Sponsor	Locality	Coach	Captain
Basilan Steel Spikers	Anak Mindanao	Basilan	Sabtal Abdul	Al-Frazin Abdulwahab
Global Remit	Philippine Navy; Global Remittances Co. Ltd.	—N/a	Edgardo Rusit	Joeven Dela Vega
Go for Gold–Air Force Aguilas	Powerball Marketing and Logistics Corp. (Go For Gold); Philippine Air Force	—N/a	Dante Alinsunurin	Jessie Lopez
Manileño Spikers	—N/a	Manila	Ralph Ocampo	Geuel Asia
MRT–Negros	Raymund Tongson	Himamaylan	Ralph Savellano	Christian Marcelino
Sabong International Spikers	Sabong International PH	Negros Oriental	Helmer Suarez	Mark Joseph Rocamora
Team Dasma Monarchs	—N/a	Dasmariñas	Norman Miguel	Jayvee Sumagaysay

== Format ==
The participating teams were drawn into two groups for the preliminary round which uses a single round robin format. The top two teams will advance to the semifinals.

== Preliminary round ==
- All times are Philippine Standard Time (UTC+08:00).

=== Pool A ===
Pos	Team	Pld	W	L	Pts	SW	SL	SR	SPW	SPL	SPR	Qualification
1	Go for Gold–Air Force Aguilas	2	2	0	5	6	2	3.000	185	168	1.101	Semifinals
2	Manileño Spikers	2	1	1	4	5	3	1.667	182	169	1.077	Semifinals
3	Basilan Steel Spikers	2	0	2	0	0	6	0.000	123	153	0.804	5th–7th semifinals

Date	Time		Score		Set 1	Set 2	Set 3	Set 4	Set 5	Total	Report
Nov 29	10:00	Go for Gold-Air Force Aguilas	3–2	Manileño Spikers	23–25	25–23	19–25	25–23	15–11	107–107	
Nov 30	13:30	Basilan Steel Spikers	0–3	Go for Gold-Air Force Aguilas	15–25	26–28	20–25			61–78	
Dec 01	13:30	Manileño Spikers	3–0	Basilan Steel Spikers	25–17	25–22	25–23			75–62	

=== Pool B ===
Pos	Team	Pld	W	L	Pts	SW	SL	SR	SPW	SPL	SPR	Qualification
1	Team Dasma Monarchs	3	3	0	8	9	3	3.000	287	250	1.148	Semifinals
2	Global Remit	3	1	2	4	6	6	1.000	265	270	0.981	Semifinals
3	Sabong International Spikers	3	1	2	4	5	7	0.714	256	270	0.948	5th–7th semifinals
4	MRT-Negros	3	1	2	2	4	8	0.500	254	262	0.969	5th–7th semifinals

Date	Time		Score		Set 1	Set 2	Set 3	Set 4	Set 5	Total	Report
Nov 29	13:30	Sabong International Spiker	2–3	MRT-Negros	22–25	16–25	25–21	25–21	12–15	100–107	
Nov 29	16:16	Global Remit	2–3	Team Dasma Monarchs	25–23	18–25	29–27	18–25	12–15	102–115	
Nov 30	10:00	Team Dasma Monarchs	3–1	MRT-Negros	25–16	22–25	25–20	25–23		97–84	
Nov 30	16:00	Global Remit	1–3	Sabong International Spikers	21–25	21–25	25–17	21–25		88–92	
Dec 01	10:00	Sabong International Spikers	0–3	Taeam Dasma Monarchs	20–25	21–25	23–25			64–75	
Dec 01	16:00	MRT-Negros	0–3	Global Remit	21–25	19–25	23–25			63–75	

== Final round ==
- All times are Philippine Standard Time (UTC+08:00).

=== 5th–7th places ===
5th–7th semifinals
14 October
Basilan Steel Spikers	0
MRT-Negros	3
14 October
Sabong International Spikers	W
bye

5th place match
15 October
MRT-Negros	3
Sabong International Spikers	0
7th place match
15 October
Basilan Steel Spikers	W
bye

==== 5th place match ====
Date	Time		Score		Set 1	Set 2	Set 3	Set 4	Set 5	Total	Report
Dec 3	10:00	MRT-Negros	3–2	Sabong International Spikers	20–25	25–14	20–25	25–21	15–5	105–90	

=== Final four ===
Semifinals
December 3
Go for Gold-Air Force Aguilas	3
Global Remit	1
December 3
Team Dasma Monarchs	3
Manileño Spikers	2

Final
December 4
Go for Gold-Air Force Aguilas	1
Team Dasma Monarchs	3
3rd place match
December 4
Global Remit	0
Manileño Spikers	3

==== Semifinals ====
Date	Time		Score		Set 1	Set 2	Set 3	Set 4	Set 5	Total	Report
Dec 3	13:30	Go for Gold-Air Force Aguilas	3–1	Global Remit	26–28	25–22	25–18	25–19		101–87	
Dec 3	16:00	Team Dasma Monarchs	3–2	Manileño Spikers	25–20	30–28	20–25	21–25	18–16	114–114	

==== 3rd place match ====
Date	Time		Score		Set 1	Set 2	Set 3	Set 4	Set 5	Total	Report
Dec 4	13:30	Global Remit	0–3	Manileño Spikers	21–25	22–25	20–25			63–75	

==== Final ====
Date	Time		Score		Set 1	Set 2	Set 3	Set 4	Set 5	Total	Report
Dec 4	16:00	Go for Gold-Air Force Aguilas	1–3	Team Dasma Monarchs	25–19	24–26	18–25	17–25		84–95	

== Final standing ==
Rank	Team
1st place, gold medalist(s)	Team Dasma Monarchs
2nd place, silver medalist(s)	Go for Gold-Air Force Aguilas
3rd place, bronze medalist(s)	Manileño Spikers
4	Global Remit
5	MRT-Negros
6	Sabong International Spikers
7	Basilan Steel Spikers

Qualified for the 2022 Asian Men's Club Volleyball Championship

2021 PNVF Champions League for Men Champions

1st title

14-Men roster
Joshua Jose, Manuel Andrei Medina, Arnold Baustista, Mark Frederick Calado, Jayvee Sumagaysay (c), Rence Melgar, Timothy James Tajanlangit, Jerome Medallion, Earl Joshua Magadan, George Labang, Ronniel Rosales, Jason Canlas, Kris Cian Silang, Madz Gampong
Head coach
Norman Miguel

== Awards ==
=== Individual awards ===
Award	Player	Team	Ref.
Most Valuable Player	Mark Calado	Team Dasma	
1st Best Outside Spiker	Mark Calado	Team Dasma	
2nd Best Outside Spiker	Mark Alfafara	Go for Gold-Air Force	
1st Best Middle Blocker	Jayvee Sumagaysay	Team Dasma	
2nd Best Middle Blocker	Rwenzmel Taguibolos	Manileño	
Best Opposite Spiker	John Vic De Guzman	Go for Gold-Air Force	
Best Setter	Kris Silang	Team Dasma	
Best Libero	Ricky Marcos	Go for Gold-Air Force	

== See also ==
- 2021 PNVF Champions League for Women
