= John Vic De Guzman =

Filipino athlete and actor (born 1993)

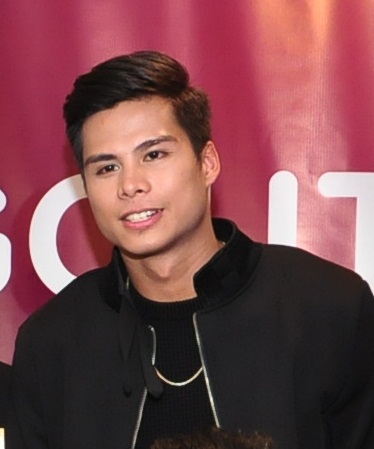
- De Guzman in 2016

Personal information
- Full name: John Vic Ortiz De Guzman
- Nationality: Filipino
- Born: September 23, 1993 (age 33)
- Education: College of Saint Benilde
- Height: 188 cm (6 ft 2 in)

Volleyball information
- Position: Opposite Spiker

Career
- Years: Team
- –: PLDT
- 2021: Rebisco PH
- 2021: Philippine Air Force Aguilas

National team
- Years: Team
- 2015: Philippines
Honours
Men's volleyball
Representing Philippines
Southeast Asian Games
Silver medal – second place	2019 Philippines	Team

John Vic Ortiz De Guzman (born September 23, 1993) is a Filipino volleyball player, actor, and singer.

== Early life and education ==
De Guzman lived in East Laguna in his early years and became involved in various extracurricular activities. In his first year of high school, he was part of a band. In the next year, he became a dancer and, in his third year of high school studies, he started to play badminton. He attended the De La Salle–College of Saint Benilde under a scholarship program. He graduated with a degree in Human Resource Management.

== Volleyball career ==
De Guzman only took up volleyball at age 18 after his high school studies. His involvement with the sport enabled him to study at no cost at the De La Salle–College of Saint Benilde (CSB) as an athletic scholar. Playing for the men's volleyball team of CSB, he led his school to back-to-back Final Four appearances. In his final school year as a college student he led his team in winning the men's volleyball title of NCAA Season 92. He was also named as the MVP and first best opposite spiker in his final NCAA season.

De Guzman also played for the Philippines men's national volleyball team in 2015. He was included in the squad played at the 2017 and 2019 Southeast Asian Games. He was also part of the national team, when it competed as Rebisco PH at the 2021 Asian Men's Club Volleyball Championship.

In the club level, De Guzman has played for PLDT and the Philippine Air Force Aguilas. He played for the latter at the 2021 PNVF Champions League.

== Acting career ==
As a child, De Guzman had aspired to become an actor.

He then starred in Seklusyon, the sole horror film entry at the 2016 Metro Manila Film Festival. He played the role of Marco, one of the four deacons in the film. Marco is characterized as someone who has many secrets and De Guzman was told to express emotions through his eyes as part of playing the role. He secured the role of Marco after director Erik Matti encouraged him to audition for the role. De Guzman also underwent an acting workshop having no prior acting experience.

In 2017, he was cast in radio series Ang Lahat Ng Ito'y Para Sa'Yo on FBS-14.

In 2018, he was cast as one of the 24 students in the suspense-thriller film Class of 2018 directed by Charliebebs Gohetia and under T-Rex Entertainment.

De Guzman signed a contract with GMA Network in September 2020, becoming a part of their talent agency GMA Artist Center (now Sparkle). Prior to that, he tried to audition in 2018 but he was rejected.

In 2022, he played the role of Dr. Kenneth 'Ken' Prado, a snobbish, judgemental, and arrogant doctor in the APEX Medical Hospital in GMA's hit drama series, Abot-Kamay na Pangarap.

== Personal life ==
De Guzman has a sister, who he viewed as an inspiration when he took up volleyball. He is also the maternal nephew of Lino Brocka.

== Filmography ==
=== Film ===
Year	Title	Role	Notes
2016	Seklusyon	Marco	Film debut
2018	Class of 2018	Jamir	Supporting cast
2018	Wild and Free	Gino	Supporting cast
2019	Pansamantagal	Singer	Special participacion

=== Television ===
Year	Title	Role	Notes
2015	The Ryzza Mae Show	Himself	Guest (with Team Bagwis)
2017–22	Ang Lahat Ng Ito'y Para Sa'Yo	Janus Miranda "Jamir" Mendoza / Gennaro "Gino" Mendoza	Supporting / Main role
2020; 2021; 2022	MARS Pa More	Himself	Guest
2020	Wish Ko Lang: Kapre	Kapre	Episode role
2020	Taste Buddies	Himself	Guest (with Thia Thomalla)
2020; 2021; 2022–present	The Boobay and Tekla Show	Himself	Guest (2020–22); Mema Squad member (since 2022)
2021	Owe My Love	Roderick Ramsay	Supporting role
2022	Family Feud	Himself	Contestant / Team Volleyball Philippines
2022	NCAA Season 97 volleyball tournaments	Himself	Analyst
2022–24	Abot-Kamay na Pangarap	Dr. Kenneth "Ken" Prado	Supporting / Recurring role
2022	TiktoClock	Himself	Guest
2023	Regal Studio Presents: Time Out	Gelo	Episode role
2023	Open 24/7	Rico	Guest
2024	Asawa ng Asawa Ko	Officer Estimos	Guest
2025	Sanggang-Dikit FR	Police Lt. Regan Robles	Supporting role/Anti-Villain

== Discography ==
Single
Year	Title	Label	Ref.
2022	Mahal Kita Pero Teka Muna	Ivory Music & Video	
