= UAAP Season 88 volleyball tournaments =

Volleyball tournaments

UAAP Season 88
- "Strength in Motion, Hope in Action"
- Host school: University of Santo Tomas (Collegiate); Far Eastern University (High School)
Men's Finals	G1	G2	Wins
FEU Tamaraws	2	0	0
NU Bulldogs	3	3	2
- Duration: May 6–9, 2026
- Arena(s): SM Mall of Asia Arena
- Finals MVP: Leo Ordiales
- Winning coach: Dante Alinsunurin
- Semifinalists: UST Golden Spikers; Ateneo Blue Eagles
- TV network(s): UAAP Varsity Channel; One Sports
Women's Finals	G1	G2	Wins
De La Salle Lady Spikers	3	3	2
NU Lady Bulldogs	0	0	0
- Duration: May 6–9, 2026
- Arena(s): SM Mall of Asia Arena
- Finals MVP: Shevana Laput
- Winning coach: Ramil de Jesus
- Semifinalists: Adamson Lady Falcons; UST Golden Tigersses
- TV network(s): UAAP Varsity Channel; One Sports
Boys' Finals	G1	G2	Wins
NUNS Bullpups	2	0	0
UE Junior Red Warriors	3	3	2
- Duration: December 11–14, 2025
- Arena(s): Blue Eagle Gym; Adamson Gym; Paco Arena
- Finals MVP: Paul Roque
- Winning coach: Herbert Dizon
- Semifinalists: FEU–D Baby Tamaraws; UST Tiger Cubs
Girls' Finals	G1	G2	Wins
NUNS Lady Bullpups	3	3	2
FEU–D Lady Baby Tamaraws	2	0	0
- Duration: December 11–14, 2025
- Arena(s): Blue Eagle Gym; Adamson Gym; Paco Arena
- Finals MVP: Rain Navarro
- Winning coach: Ray Karl Dimaculangan
- Semifinalists: Adamson Lady Baby Falcons; UST Junior Tigresses

The UAAP Season 88 volleyball tournaments is the University Athletic Association of the Philippines (UAAP) volleyball tournaments for the 2025–26 school year.

The collegiate men's and women's tournaments began on February 14, 2026.

The high school boys' and girls' tournaments began on September 21, 2025.

== Teams ==
All eight member universities of the UAAP fielded teams in the collegiate division while 8 universities fielded teams in the boys' and girls' division, respectively.

Collegiate division
University	Men		Women	
University	Team	Coach	Team	Coach
Adamson University (AdU)	Soaring Falcons	Raffy Mosuela	Lady Falcons	JP Yude
Ateneo de Manila University (ADMU)	Blue Eagles	Vince Mangulabnan	Blue Eagles	Sergio Veloso
De La Salle University (DLSU)	Green Spikers	Jose Roque	Lady Spikers	Ramil De Jesus and Noel Orcullo
Far Eastern University (FEU)	Tamaraws	Eddieson Orcullo	Lady Tamaraws	Tina Salak
National University (NU)	Bulldogs	Dante Alinsunurin	Lady Bulldogs	Regine Diego
University of the East (UE)	Red Warriors	Jerome Guhit	Lady Red Warriors	Ronwald Kris Dimaculangan
University of the Philippines Diliman (UP)	Fighting Maroons	Carlo Cabatingan	Fighting Maroons	Fabio Menta
University of Santo Tomas (UST)	Golden Spikers	Arthur Alan Mamon	Golden Tigresses	Shaq Delos Santos

High School division
High school	Boys' team	Girls' team
Adamson University (AdU)	Baby Falcons	Lady Baby Falcons
Ateneo de Manila University (AdMU)	Blue Eagles	Blue Eagles
De La Salle Santiago Zobel School (DLSZ)	Junior Green Spikers	Junior Lady Spikers
Far Eastern University Diliman (FEU–D)	Baby Tamaraws	Lady Baby Tamaraws
Nazareth School of National University (NSNU)	Bullpups	Lady Bullpups
University of the East (UE)	Junior Warriors	Junior Lady Warriors
University of the Philippines Integrated School (UPIS)	Junior Fighting Maroons	Junior Fighting Maroons
University of Santo Tomas Senior High School (UST)	Junior Golden Spikers	Junior Golden Tigresses

=== Coaching changes ===
Team	Outgoing coach	Manner of departure	Date	Replaced by	Date
UST Golden Tigresses	Kungfu Reyes	Reassigned	June 3, 2025	Shaq Delos Santos	June 3, 2025
UE Lady Red Warriors	Allan Mendoza	Fired	June 12, 2025	Ronwald Kris Dimaculangan	June 16, 2025
NU Lady Bulldogs	Sherwin Meneses	Fired	September 3, 2025	Regine Diego	September 3, 2025
UP Fighting Maroons	Benson Bocboc	Fired	September 4, 2025	Fabio Menta	January 22, 2026

== Men's tournament ==
=== Team line-up ===
Adamson Soaring Falcons
No.	Name	Position
1	Menor, Joel	OH
2	Flestado, Lance Gian	OP
3	Gutierrez, Dan Russel	OH
6	Costelo, Ray Vhan	L
7	Gay, John Eugenio	S
8	Coguimbal, Mark Leo (c)	MB
11	Domingo, Ronn Lourenz	S
12	Pon-an, Arvin	MB
14	Garces, Josefino Louise	MB
16	Ornos, Zyro	MB
17	Ducusin, Jims Raven	OP
18	Obeda, Ricardo	MB
20	Tan, Maruel Iverson	OP
21	Besorio, Richard	OH
23	Tahiluddin, Ahmed Vezie	OH
24	Cuadra, Arnhil	L
	MOSUELA, Raffy	HC

Ateneo Blue Eagles
No.	Name	Position
1	Okeke, Chidiebere Emmanuel	OH
2	Crisostomo, Leinuel	L
3	Gutierrez, Lorenzo Samuel	S
4	Salarzon, Jian Matthew (c)	OH
5	Batas, Kennedy	OP
7	Alejos, Kristofer Rodge	MB
8	Pacinio, Amil Jr.	OP
9	Reyes, Karl Emerzone	OP
11	Taluban, Eijra Kayelle	S
12	Atendido, Le Preece	OP
13	De Castro, Lance Andrei	L
14	Yu, Julio Miguel	OH
16	Almadro, Andrie John	OP
17	Sendon, Jeric	MB
18	Medino, Jon Paolo	OH
23	Castro, Brian	MB
	MANGULABNAN, Vince	HC

De La Salle Green Spikers
No.	Name	Position
1	Mendoza, Uriel	OH
3	Flores, Robert	L
4	Regidor, Ezer Jake	S
5	Retiro, Sherwin	L
7	Layug, Eric Paolo	MB
9	Magallanes, Arjay	OH
11	Gloria, Eugene	OH
12	Fortuna, Michael John	OP
13	Ousseini, Issa	MB
14	Flores, Neil Laurence	L
15	Abut, Matthew Thomas	OH
17	Hernandez, Chris Emmanuel	OH
20	Ventura, Glen Rui	OP
21	Bangit, Nathaniel Jamieson	S
22	Magalaman, Joshua	MB
24	Rodriguez, Joshua Jamiel (c) |	MB
	ROQUE, Jose	HC

FEU Tamaraws
No.	Name	Position
1	Ceballos, Vennie Paul	L
2	Briones, Jake Jayson	L
3	Cacao, Ariel (c)	S
5	Espartero, Mikko	OH
6	Salboro, Christian Paul	OH
8	Tandoc, Kyle Clarence	OH
9	Saavedra, Zhydryx	OP
11	Mendoza, Lirick John	MB
12	Miguel, Luis Michael	OP
14	Du-ot, Rhodson	S
15	Ndongala, Doula	MB
17	Martinez, Benny	S
18	Postorioso, Reynan	OP
19	Bituin, Amet Samuel	OP
22	Absin, Charles David	MB
24	Garriedo, Judi Laurence	MB
	ORCULLO, Eddieson	HC

NU Bulldogs
No.	Name	Position
2	Ancheta, Greg Augustus Luis	S
3	Gallego, Jeffe Jr.	S
5	Abanilla, Jan Llanfred	OP
6	Buddin, Michaelo	OH
7	Egger, Herbert Miguel	MB
9	Mendoza, Yuan	OH
10	Mukaba, Obed	MB
11	Disquitado, Jade Alex	OH
12	Taguibolos, Rwenzmel (c)	MB
14	Ordiales, Leo	OP
15	Hernandez, Michael Jonas	L
17	Gapultos, Jimwell	L
18	Bolabola, Andrei	S
19	Parreno, John Kade	L
22	Macatangay, Luke Anton Carl	MB
23	Diao, Jenngerard Arnfranz	MB
	ALINSUNURIN, Dante	HC

UE Red Warriors
No.	Name	Position
2	Aceron, Raquim Joefe	OH
3	Malit, Gene Andrei	MB
4	Camaymayan, Xjhann Viandre	MB
5	Maglay, Jhon Stewart	OH
6	Rada, Jio Jero	S
7	Ancheta, Aaron Joseph	MB
8	Yturralde, Reiner Dylan	S
10	Perit, Gerald Lance	MB
11	Villanueva, Joshua Rey	L
12	Bicar, Joseph Andre	S
13	Nabora, Carl John	L
14	Gabotero, Peter John ll	OH
15	Piojo, Roy Gabriel	OH
18	Libot, Jan Dever	OH
19	Budias, Marl Lee	OP
20	Roca, Isaiah Jhon (c)	OP
	GUHIT, Jerome	HC

UP Fighting Maroons
No.	Name	Position
1	Baylon, Grayhood	OP
2	Santiago, Clarence	S
3	Bersano, Niño Nikko	L
5	Perjes, Erick John	MB
8	Castrodes, Tommy	OH
9	Aballe, Louise Angelo	S
10	Chevis, Kenneth Wayne	MB
11	Sotto, Justine John	L
12	Calipes, Ricardo Sebastian	S
13	Pacure, Zairus Dale	OH
14	Robles, Abram Joshrel	MB
15	Francisco, Milven Jr.	MB
17	Raheem, Olayemi (c)	OH
18	Aca-ac, Kobe Klien	OP
19	Vicente, Michael Raymund	MB
21	Lipata, Angelo	OP
	CABATINGAN, Carlo	HC

UST Golden Spikers
No.	Name	Position
1	De Vega, Rey Miguel	OH
3	Yamanaka, Ryuichi Isaiah	MB
4	Tavera, Kevin Luis	S
5	Macam, Jan Julian	OH
6	Sali, Al-Bukharie	OP
7	Yambao, Dux Euan (c)	S
9	Avila, Joshua	S
10	Legaspi, Gionne Kalel	L
12	Alabar, Edriel	L
13	Ybañez, Josh	OH
14	Valera, Trevor	MB
15	Umandal, Sherwin John	OP
16	Hernandez, Kris Gabriel	OH
18	Catinsag, Josh Vryvin	MB
21	Malabunga, Karbe	MB
25	Ayco, Joncriz	OP
	MAMON, Arthur Alan	HC

Legend
S	Setter
MB	Middle Blocker
OH	Outside Hitter
OP	Opposite Hitter
L	Libero
(c)	Team Captain
HC	Head coach

=== Elimination round ===
==== Team standings ====
Pos	Team	Pld	W	L	Pts	SW	SL	SR	SPW	SPL	SPR	Qualification
1	FEU Tamaraws	14	13	1	39	41	12	3.417	1167	1017	1.147	Twice-to-beat in the semifinals
2	NU Bulldogs	14	10 (Note: Second-seed playoff: NU 3–1 UST)	4	30	36	16	2.250	1220	1081	1.129	Twice-to-beat in the semifinals
3	UST Golden Spikers (H)	14	10	4	30	34	18	1.889	1223	1151	1.063	Twice-to-win in the semifinals
4	Ateneo Blue Eagles	14	7	7	20	28	29	0.966	1204	1167	1.032	Twice-to-win in the semifinals
5	De La Salle Green Spikers	14	6	8	17	23	32	0.719	1335	1375	0.971	
6	UE Red Warriors	14	4	10	12	18	34	0.529	1020	1149	0.888	
7	Adamson Soaring Falcons	14	3	11	10	20	38	0.526	1162	1271	0.914	
8	UP Fighting Maroons	14	3	11	10	17	37	0.459	1227	1347	0.911	

Source: UAAP Volleyball on Livestats
Rules for classification: 1) number of wins; 2) if tied for No. 2 or 4, one-game playoff; 3) match points; 4) sets ratio; 5) points ratio; 6) head-to-head record
(H) Host

==== Match-up results ====
	Round 1							Round 2						
Team ╲ Game	1	2	3	4	5	6	7	8	9	10	11	12	13	14
Adamson	Ateneo school colors	NU school colors	UE school colors	FEU school colors	UST school colors	La Salle school colors	UP school colors	La Salle school colors	Ateneo school colors	UE school colors	NU school colors	UST school colors	UP school colors	FEU school colors
Ateneo	Adamson school colors	UP school colors	UST school colors	La Salle school colors	FEU school colors	NU school colors	UE school colors	UST school colors	Adamson school colors	NU school colors	UP school colors	La Salle school colors	UE school colors	FEU school colors
La Salle	FEU school colors	UST school colors	UP school colors	Ateneo school colors	UE school colors	Adamson school colors	NU school colors	Adamson school colors	UST school colors	UP school colors	FEU school colors	Ateneo school colors	UE school colors	NU school colors
FEU	La Salle school colors	UE school colors	NU school colors	Adamson school colors	Ateneo school colors	UP school colors	UST school colors	UE school colors	NU school colors	UST school colors	La Salle school colors	UP school colors	Adamson school colors	Ateneo school colors
NU	UST school colors	Adamson school colors	FEU school colors	UP school colors	UE school colors	Ateneo school colors	La Salle school colors	UP school colors	FEU school colors	Ateneo school colors	Adamson school colors	UE school colors	La Salle school colors	UST school colors
UE	UP school colors	FEU school colors	Adamson school colors	UST school colors	NU school colors	La Salle school colors	Ateneo school colors	FEU school colors	UP school colors	Adamson school colors	UST school colors	NU school colors	La Salle school colors	Ateneo school colors
UP	UE school colors	Ateneo school colors	La Salle school colors	NU school colors	FEU school colors	UST school colors	Adamson school colors	NU school colors	UE school colors	La Salle school colors	Ateneo school colors	FEU school colors	Adamson school colors	UST school colors
UST	NU school colors	La Salle school colors	Ateneo school colors	UE school colors	Adamson school colors	UP school colors	FEU school colors	Ateneo school colors	La Salle school colors	FEU school colors	UE school colors	Adamson school colors	UP school colors	NU school colors

Source: UAAP Volleyball on Livestats
= Win; = Loss

==== Game results ====
Results on top and to the right of the solid cells are for first-round games; those to the bottom and left are for second-round games.

Teams	AdU	ADMU	DLSU	FEU	NU	UE	UP	UST
Adamson Soaring Falcons		3–2	1–3	0–3	0–3	2–3	3–2	0–3
Ateneo Blue Eagles	3–1		3–2	1–3	0–3	3–0	3–1	2–3
De La Salle Green Spikers	3–1	0–3		0–3	3–2	3–1	1–3	1–3
FEU Tamaraws	3–2	3–1	3–1		3–1	3–0	3–0	3–1
NU Bulldogs	3–2	3–0	2–3	3–2		3–0	3–0	3–0
UE Red Warriors	3–1	3–1	3–0	1–3	0–3		2–3	0–3
UP Fighting Maroons	1–3	2–3	1–3	0–3	0–3	3–1		0–3
UST Golden Spikers	3–1	2–3	3–0	1–3	3–1	3–1	3–0	

Source: UAAP Volleyball on Livestats
Legend: Blue = left column team win; Red = top row team win.

=== Second-seed playoff ===
NU and UST, which are tied at second place, played for the #2 seed and the twice–to–beat advantage.

April 25, 2026; 1:00 PM (UTC+8:00)	NU Bulldogs	3–1	UST Golden Spikers	Smart Araneta Coliseum, Quezon City; Attendance: 3,895; Referees: Jason Magat (PHI), Ely De Jesus (PHI)
April 25, 2026; 1:00 PM (UTC+8:00)	(25–22, 20–25, 25–23, 28–26); Report P2			Smart Araneta Coliseum, Quezon City; Attendance: 3,895; Referees: Jason Magat (PHI), Ely De Jesus (PHI)
April 25, 2026; 1:00 PM (UTC+8:00)	NU wins the twice–to–beat advantage			Smart Araneta Coliseum, Quezon City; Attendance: 3,895; Referees: Jason Magat (PHI), Ely De Jesus (PHI)

=== Bracket ===
Semifinals (Top 2 twice-to-beat)
1	FEU	3
4	Ateneo	2
2	NU	3
3	UST	0

Finals (Best-of-three playoff)
1	FEU	2	0
2	NU	3	3

=== Semifinals ===
FEU and NU have the twice-to-beat advantage. They only need to win once while their opponents twice in order to qualify in the Finals.

==== (1) FEU vs. (4) Ateneo ====
April 29, 2026; 11:00 AM (UTC+8:00)	FEU Tamaraws	3–2	Ateneo Blue Eagles	Smart Araneta Coliseum, Quezon City; Attendance: 3,119; Referees: Jay Deriquito (PHI), Philip Nuñez (PHI)
April 29, 2026; 11:00 AM (UTC+8:00)	(25–23, 20–25, 16–25, 25–17, 15–12); Report P2			Smart Araneta Coliseum, Quezon City; Attendance: 3,119; Referees: Jay Deriquito (PHI), Philip Nuñez (PHI)
April 29, 2026; 11:00 AM (UTC+8:00)	FEU wins series in one game			Smart Araneta Coliseum, Quezon City; Attendance: 3,119; Referees: Jay Deriquito (PHI), Philip Nuñez (PHI)

==== (2) NU vs. (3) UST ====
April 29, 2026; 1:00 PM (UTC+8:00)	NU Bulldogs	3–0	UST Golden Spikers	Smart Araneta Coliseum, Quezon City; Attendance: 1,900; Referees: Ely De Jesus (PHI), Jason Magat (PHI)
April 29, 2026; 1:00 PM (UTC+8:00)	(25–21, 30–28, 25–19); Report P2			Smart Araneta Coliseum, Quezon City; Attendance: 1,900; Referees: Ely De Jesus (PHI), Jason Magat (PHI)
April 29, 2026; 1:00 PM (UTC+8:00)	NU wins series in one game			Smart Araneta Coliseum, Quezon City; Attendance: 1,900; Referees: Ely De Jesus (PHI), Jason Magat (PHI)

=== Finals ===
The finals is a best-of-three series.

May 6, 2026; 12:00 PM (UTC+8:00)	FEU Tamaraws	2–3	NU Bulldogs	SM Mall of Asia Arena, Pasay City; Attendance: 7,498; Referees: Ely De Jesus (PHI), Rolando Casillan (PHI)
May 6, 2026; 12:00 PM (UTC+8:00)	(25–21, 19–25, 25–21, 20–25, 8–15); Report P2			SM Mall of Asia Arena, Pasay City; Attendance: 7,498; Referees: Ely De Jesus (PHI), Rolando Casillan (PHI)

May 9, 2026; 12:00 (UTC+8:00)	FEU Tamaraws	0–3	NU Bulldogs	SM Mall of Asia Arena, Pasay City; Attendance: 9,790; Referees: Jay Deriquito (PHI), Philip Nuñez (PHI)
May 9, 2026; 12:00 (UTC+8:00)	(24–26, 22–25, 22–25); Report P2			SM Mall of Asia Arena, Pasay City; Attendance: 9,790; Referees: Jay Deriquito (PHI), Philip Nuñez (PHI)
May 9, 2026; 12:00 (UTC+8:00)	NU wins series, 2–0			SM Mall of Asia Arena, Pasay City; Attendance: 9,790; Referees: Jay Deriquito (PHI), Philip Nuñez (PHI)

- Finals Most Valuable Player: Leo Ordiales (NU Bulldogs)

=== Awards ===
UAAP Season 88 men's volleyball champions
NU Bulldogs
Eighth title, sixth consecutive title

The awards were handed out prior to Game 2 of the Finals at the SM Mall of Asia Arena.

- Most Valuable Player: Josh Ybañez (UST Golden Spikers)
- Finals Most Valuable Player: Leo Ordiales (NU Bulldogs)
- Rookie of the Year: Richard Besorio (Adamson Soaring Falcons)
- 1st Best Outside Spiker: Josh Ybañez (UST Golden Spikers)
- 2nd Best Outside Spiker: Michaelo Buddin (NU Bulldogs)
- 1st Best Middle Blocker: Issa Ousseini (De La Salle Green Spikers)
- 2nd Best Middle Blocker: Lirick Mendoza (FEU Tamaraws)
- Best Opposite Spiker: Leo Ordiales (NU Bulldogs)
- Best Setter: Ariel Cacao (FEU Tamaraws)
- Best Libero: Vennie Ceballos (FEU Tamaraws)

==== Players of the Week ====
The Collegiate Press Corps awards a "player of the week" for performances on the preceding week.

Week	Player	Team	Ref.
Week 1	Zhydryx Saavedra	FEU Tamaraws	
Week 2	Josh Ybañez	UST Golden Spikers	
Week 3	Jade Disquitado	NU Bulldogs	
Week 4	Eugene Gloria	De La Salle Green Spikers	
Week 5	Michaelo Buddin	NU Bulldogs	
Week 6	Michaelo Buddin	NU Bulldogs	
Week 7	Jian Salarzon	Ateneo Blue Eagles	
Week 8	Raquim Aceron	UE Red Warriors	

== Women's tournament ==
=== Team line-up ===
Adamson Lady Falcons
No.	Name	Position
1	Nitura, Shaina Marie (c)	OH
2	Jamili, Jimy Jean	OH
3	Tuddao, Lhouiz	MB
4	Dote, Princess Eloisa	MB
8	Rocha, Kim Yra	OP
9	Sapienza, Maria Ysabella Francesca	S
10	Dionisio, Kamille	MB
13	Mordi, Frances Ifeoma	OH
14	Sagaysay, Felicity Marie	S
16	Bascon, Red	OH
17	Aseo, Marie Joy	OH
18	Segui, Abegail	OP
19	Aposaga, Athea Jamine	L
20	Divinagracia, Frisha Angeline	MB
21	Barrera, Lana Isabella	OH
23	Gam, Claire Jesselou	L
	YUDE, JP	HC

Ateneo Blue Eagles
No.	Name	Position
1	Hora, Gena May	OP
3	Njigha, Chucel	OP
5	Cortez, Katherine Shaine	S
6	Pacia, Zey Mitzi	OP
8	Montoro, Alexia Marie	OH
9	Fujimoto, Takako (c)	S
10	Delos Santos, Jennifer Louise	OH
11	Tsunashima, Geezel May	OP
12	Chuatico, Jihan Isabelle	MB
13	Silla, Ma. Robielle Angela	MB
14	Hermosura, Ana Francessca	OH
16	De Leon, Donna Mae	MB
18	Lomocso, Beautiliza	S
19	Arroyo, Fiona Marie	L
22	De Chavez, Stephanie	L
24	Nisperos, Faye Sophia Ysabelle	OH
	VELOSO, Sergio	HC

De La Salle Lady Spikers
No.	Name	Position
1	Santos, Maria Michaela	OP
3	Buenaventura, Ashlee	MB
4	Rodriguez, Francesca Sofia	L
5	De Leon, Lyka May	L
7	Laput, Shevana Maria Nicola (c)	OP
8	Cabradilla, Althea Brean Marie	OH
9	Nunag, Eshana Rose	S
10	Reyes, Mikole	S
11	Reterta, Mary Shane	OH
12	Canino, Angel Anne	OH
15	Provido, Amie	MB
16	De Guzman, Ella Kathrina	OH
17	Caringal, Vida Dominique	MB
21	De Jesus, Jhianna May	L
22	Del Castillo, Katrina	MB
23	Ewis, Angel Lou	MB
	DE JESUS, Ramil	HC

FEU Lady Tamaraws
No.	Name	Position
1	Bakanke, Faida	OP
2	Pons, Melody	OH
4	Pendon, Kyle	OP
5	Ubaldo, Christine	S
6	Lopez, Lovely Rose	OH
7	Asis, Ann Roselle	MB
8	Panangin, Mitzi	MB
10	Loresco, Clarisse	MB
11	Miranda, Karyll	S
13	Devosora, Alyzza Gaile	OH
14	Suplico, Mary Karylle	L
15	Petallo, Gerzel Mary (c)	OH
17	Encarnacion, Margarett Louise	L
21	Ellarina, Jazlyn Ann	MB
24	David, Ia Madane	OH
23	Ramos, Christine Dominique	S
	SALAK, Cristina	HC

NU Lady Bulldogs
No.	Name	Position
1	Bombita, Nathasza Kaye	OP
3	Pono, Abegail	S
5	Jardio, Shaira Mae	L
6	Alinsug, Evangeline (c)	OH
7	Jacob, Jenelyn	MB
8	Salazar, Josline Patriz	MB
10	Mata, Alexa Nichole	MB
12	Cantada, Samantha Chloey	OH
13	Lamina, Camilla Victoria	S
14	Serneche, Harlyn	OP
15	Daylisan, Denesse	OH
17	Maaya, Minierva	MB
18	Panique, Arah Ella	OP
19	Marsh, Celine Elizabeth	OH
20	Cepada, Ic	L
21	Escanlar, Myrtle	OH
	DIEGO, Regine	HC

UE Lady Red Warriors
No.	Name	Position
1	Cepada, Kc	OH
2	Torres, Mykeesha	L
3	Olmoguez, Shainna	MB
4	Taylan, Samantha Nicole	OH
5	Arasan, Jennel Sofia	S
6	Nogueras, Princess Eljane	MB
7	Pepino, Angel Lynn	MB
9	Panisales, Marianne Angela Gabriel	OH
10	Fulo, Aliya Lois Anne	OP
11	Famulagan, Kesha Marie	MB
12	Bangayan, Vanessa Karzai (c)	OP
14	Cañete, Ashley	OP
16	Zamudio, Beatrice Anne	OH
18	Iquio, Kristine Marie Smile	OH
20	Reyes, Angelica	L
21	Relox, Denniz Psychi	L
	DIMACULANGAN, Ronwald Kris	HC

UP Fighting Maroons
No.	Name	Position
1	Manguilimotan, Jaz	S
2	Capistrano, Geisha Niccaleigh	L
4	Noceja, Yesha	OH
5	Umayam, Jenalyn	MB
6	Olango, Kianne Louise	OP
7	De Leon, Julia Annikha	S
8	Monares, Joan Marie (c)	OH
9	Ytang, Niña	MB
10	Jaboneta, Irah Anika	OH/L
11	Baclay, Jan Halley	MB
12	Madriaga, Kizzie	S
13	Ali, Sarah	MB
14	Bansil, Bienne Louis	MB
15	Gajero, Jelaica Faye	OP
20	Fernandez, Gracel Shamel	L
24	Dongallo, Casiey Monique	OH
	MENTA, Fabio	HC

UST Golden Tigresses
No.	Name	Position
2	Arasan, Stephanie Bien	OH
4	Pepito, Ma. Bernadett (c)	L
5	Bron, Avril Denise	MB
8	Altea, Margaret	MB
10	Gula, Xyza Rufel	OH
11	Balingit, Julia	OP
12	Penuliar, Lianne	MB
13	Perdido, Jonna Chris	OH
14	Escober, Sandrine Victoria	L
15	Waje, Arlene	S
16	Carballo, Ma. Cassandra Rae	S
17	Poyos, Angeline	OH
18	Jurado, Regina Grace	OP
19	Coronado, Mary Joe	MB
24	Acojedo, Anya	S
25	Unekwe, Blessing Ezinne	MB
	DELOS SANTOS, Shaq	HC

Legend
S	Setter
MB	Middle Blocker
OH	Outside Hitter
OP	Opposite Hitter
L	Libero
(c)	Team Captain
HC	Head coach

=== Elimination round ===
==== Team standings ====
Pos	Team	Pld	W	L	Pts	SW	SL	SR	SPW	SPL	SPR	Qualification
1	De La Salle Lady Spikers	14	14	0	39	42	10	4.200	1212	983	1.233	Advance to the finals (Note: As La Salle won all of their elimination round games, the stepladder format will be used instead of the regular Final Four format.)
2	NU Lady Bulldogs	14	10	4	30	37	19	1.947	1218	1068	1.140	Proceed to stepladder round 2
3	Adamson Lady Falcons	14	9	5	28	31	16	1.938	898	785	1.144	Proceed to stepladder round 1
4	UST Golden Tigresses (H)	14	8 (Note: Fourth seed playoff: UST 3–1 FEU)	6	25	28	22	1.273	1124	1062	1.058	Proceed to stepladder round 1
5	FEU Lady Tamaraws	14	8	6	24	29	24	1.208	1113	1040	1.070	
6	UP Fighting Maroons	14	5	9	14	20	32	0.625	1053	1164	0.905	
7	Ateneo Blue Eagles	14	2	12	8	12	36	0.333	861	1058	0.814	
8	UE Lady Red Warriors	14	0	14	0	2	42	0.048	779	1110	0.702	

Source: UAAP Volleyball on Livestats
Rules for classification: 1) number of wins; 2) if tied for No. 2 or 4, one-game playoff; 3) match points; 4) sets ratio; 5) points ratio; 6) head-to-head record
(H) Host

==== Match-up results ====
	Round 1							Round 2						
Team ╲ Game	1	2	3	4	5	6	7	8	9	10	11	12	13	14
Adamson	Ateneo school colors	NU school colors	UE school colors	FEU school colors	UST school colors	La Salle school colors	UP school colors	La Salle school colors	Ateneo school colors	UE school colors	NU school colors	UST school colors	UP school colors	FEU school colors
Ateneo	Adamson school colors	UP school colors	UST school colors	La Salle school colors	FEU school colors	NU school colors	UE school colors	UST school colors	Adamson school colors	NU school colors	UP school colors	La Salle school colors	UE school colors	FEU school colors
La Salle	FEU school colors	UST school colors	UP school colors	Ateneo school colors	UE school colors	Adamson school colors	NU school colors	Adamson school colors	UST school colors	UP school colors	FEU school colors	Ateneo school colors	UE school colors	NU school colors
FEU	La Salle school colors	UE school colors	NU school colors	Adamson school colors	Ateneo school colors	UP school colors	UST school colors	UE school colors	NU school colors	UST school colors	La Salle school colors	UP school colors	Adamson school colors	Ateneo school colors
NU	UST school colors	Adamson school colors	FEU school colors	UP school colors	UE school colors	Ateneo school colors	La Salle school colors	UP school colors	FEU school colors	Ateneo school colors	Adamson school colors	UE school colors	La Salle school colors	UST school colors
UE	UP school colors	FEU school colors	Adamson school colors	UST school colors	NU school colors	La Salle school colors	Ateneo school colors	FEU school colors	UP school colors	Adamson school colors	UST school colors	NU school colors	La Salle school colors	Ateneo school colors
UP	UE school colors	Ateneo school colors	La Salle school colors	NU school colors	FEU school colors	UST school colors	Adamson school colors	NU school colors	UE school colors	La Salle school colors	Ateneo school colors	FEU school colors	Adamson school colors	UST school colors
UST	NU school colors	La Salle school colors	Ateneo school colors	UE school colors	Adamson school colors	UP school colors	FEU school colors	Ateneo school colors	La Salle school colors	FEU school colors	UE school colors	Adamson school colors	UP school colors	NU school colors

Source: UAAP Volleyball on Livestats
= Win; = Loss

==== Game results ====
Results on top and to the right of the solid cells are for first-round games; those to the bottom and left are for second-round games.

Teams	AdU	ADMU	DLSU	FEU	NU	UE	UP	UST
Adamson Lady Falcons		3–0	2–3	1–3	0–3	3–1	3–0	3–0
Ateneo Blue Eagles	0–3		1–3	0–3	0–3	3–0	2–3	0–3
De La Salle Lady Spikers	3–1	3–0		3–0	3–1	3–0	3–0	3–0
FEU Lady Tamaraws	0–3	3–2	2–3		2–3	3–0	3–0	0–3
NU Lady Bulldogs	3–0	3–0	2–3	2–3		3–0	2–3	3–1
UE Lady Red Warriors	0–3	0–3	0–3	0–3	0–3		1–3	0–3
UP Fighting Maroons	0–3	3–0	0–3	1–3	2–3	3–0		1–3
UST Golden Tigresses	0–3	3–1	1–3	3–1	2–3	3–0	3–1	

Source: UAAP Volleyball on Livestats
Legend: Blue = left column team win; Red = top row team win.

=== Fourth seed playoff ===
UST and FEU, which are tied at fourth place, played for the #4 seed, the last berth of the stepladder playoffs.

April 25, 2026; 3:00 PM (UTC+8:00)	UST Golden Tigresses	3–1	FEU Lady Tamaraws	Smart Araneta Coliseum, Quezon City; Attendance: 3,217; Referees: Jay Deriquito (PHI), Kim Yadao (PHI)
April 25, 2026; 3:00 PM (UTC+8:00)	(16–25, 25–20, 25–18, 25–16); Report P2			Smart Araneta Coliseum, Quezon City; Attendance: 3,217; Referees: Jay Deriquito (PHI), Kim Yadao (PHI)

=== Bracket ===
Stepladder round 1 (Single-elimination)
3	Adamson	0
4	UST	3

Stepladder round 2 (Single-elimination)
2	NU	3
4	UST	1

Finals (Best-of-three series)
1	La Salle	3	3
2	NU	0	0

=== Stepladder semifinals ===
Both rounds are single-elimination.

==== (3) Adamson vs. (4) UST ====
April 29, 2026; 3:00 PM (UTC+8:00)	Adamson Lady Falcons	0–3	UST Golden Tigresses	Smart Araneta Coliseum, Quezon City; Attendance: 14,419; Referees: Camille Abanto (PHI), Kim Yadao (PHI)
April 29, 2026; 3:00 PM (UTC+8:00)	(16–25, 18–25, 19–25); Report P2			Smart Araneta Coliseum, Quezon City; Attendance: 14,419; Referees: Camille Abanto (PHI), Kim Yadao (PHI)
April 29, 2026; 3:00 PM (UTC+8:00)	UST advances to the second round			Smart Araneta Coliseum, Quezon City; Attendance: 14,419; Referees: Camille Abanto (PHI), Kim Yadao (PHI)

==== (2) NU vs. (4) UST ====
May 2, 2026; 3:00 PM (UTC+8:00)	NU Lady Bulldogs	3–1	UST Golden Tigresses	Smart Araneta Coliseum, Quezon City; Attendance: 15,000; Referees: Jason Magat (PHI), Antonio Espartero (PHI)
May 2, 2026; 3:00 PM (UTC+8:00)	(20–25, 26–24, 26–24, 25–21); Report P2			Smart Araneta Coliseum, Quezon City; Attendance: 15,000; Referees: Jason Magat (PHI), Antonio Espartero (PHI)
May 2, 2026; 3:00 PM (UTC+8:00)	NU advances to the Finals			Smart Araneta Coliseum, Quezon City; Attendance: 15,000; Referees: Jason Magat (PHI), Antonio Espartero (PHI)

=== Finals ===
The finals is a best-of-three series.

May 6, 2026; 5:00 PM (UTC+8:00)	De La Salle Lady Spikers	3–0	NU Lady Bulldogs	SM Mall of Asia Arena, Pasay City; Attendance: 12,257; Referees: Camille Abanto (PHI), Aikle Tero (PHI)
May 6, 2026; 5:00 PM (UTC+8:00)	(25–23, 25–18, 25–18); Report P2			SM Mall of Asia Arena, Pasay City; Attendance: 12,257; Referees: Camille Abanto (PHI), Aikle Tero (PHI)

May 9, 2026; 5:00 PM (UTC+8:00)	De La Salle Lady Spikers	3–0	NU Lady Bulldogs	SM Mall of Asia Arena, Pasay City; Attendance: 17,596; Referees: Ely De Jesus (PHI), Rolando Casillan (PHI)
May 9, 2026; 5:00 PM (UTC+8:00)	(25–22, 25–16, 25–16); Report P2			SM Mall of Asia Arena, Pasay City; Attendance: 17,596; Referees: Ely De Jesus (PHI), Rolando Casillan (PHI)
May 9, 2026; 5:00 PM (UTC+8:00)	La Salle wins series, 2–0			SM Mall of Asia Arena, Pasay City; Attendance: 17,596; Referees: Ely De Jesus (PHI), Rolando Casillan (PHI)

- Finals Most Valuable Player: Shevana Laput (De La Salle Lady Spikers)

=== Awards ===
UAAP Season 88 women's volleyball champions
De La Salle Lady Archers
13th title

The awards were handed out prior to Game 2 of the Finals at the SM Mall of Asia Arena.

- Most Valuable Player: Shaina Nitura (Adamson Lady Falcons)
- Finals Most Valuable Player: Shevana Laput (De La Salle Lady Spikers)
- Rookie of the Year: Samantha Cantada (NU Lady Bulldogs)
- 1st Best Outside Spiker: Shaina Nitura (Adamson Lady Falcons)
- 2nd Best Outside Spiker: Angel Anne Canino (De La Salle Lady Spikers)
- 1st Best Middle Blocker: Amie Provido (De La Salle Lady Spikers)
- 2nd Best Middle Blocker: Niña Ytang (UP Fighting Maroons)
- Best Opposite Spiker: Shevana Laput (De La Salle Lady Spikers)
- Best Setter: Felicity Sagaysay (Adamson Lady Falcons)
- Best Libero: Shaira Jardio (NU Lady Bulldogs)

==== Players of the Week ====
The Collegiate Press Corps awards a "player of the week" for performances on the preceding week.

Week	Player	Team	Ref.
Week 1	Shevana Laput	De La Salle Lady Spikers	
Week 2	Angel Canino	De La Salle Lady Spikers	
Week 3	Shaina Nitura	Adamson Lady Falcons	
Week 4	Shevana Laput	De La Salle Lady Spikers	
Week 5	Lovely Lopez	FEU Lady Tamaraws	
Week 6	Camilla Lamina	NU Lady Bulldogs	
Week 7	Eshana Nunag	De La Salle Lady Spikers	
Week 8	Shaira Jardio	NU Lady Bulldogs	

== Boys' tournament ==
=== Team line-up ===
Adamson Baby Falcons
No.	Name	Position
1		
2		
3		
4		
5		
6		
7		
8		
9		
10		
11		
12		
13		
14		
		HC

Ateneo Blue Eagles
No.	Name	Position
1		
2		
3		
4		
5		
6		
7		
8		
9		
10		
11		
12		
13		
14		
		HC

DLSZ Junior Green Spikers
No.	Name	Position
1		
2		
3		
4		
5		
6		
7		
8		
9		
10		
11		
12		
13		
14		
		HC

FEU–D Baby Tamaraws
No.	Name	Position
1		
2		
3		
4		
5		
6		
7		
8		
9		
10		
11		
12		
13		
14		
		HC

NUNS Bullpups
No.	Name	Position
1		
2		
3		
4		
5		
6		
7		
8		
9		
10		
11		
12		
13		
14		
		HC

UE Junior Red Warriors
No.	Name	Position
1		
2		
3		
4		
5		
6		
7		
8		
9		
10		
11		
12		
13		
14		
		HC

UST Junior Golden Spikers
No.	Name	Position
1		
2		
3		
4		
5		
6		
7		
8		
9		
10		
11		
12		
13		
14		
		HC

UP Junior Fighting Maroons
No.	Name	Position
1		
2		
3		
4		
5		
6		
7		
8		
9		
10		
11		
12		
13		
14		
		HC

Legend
S	Setter
MB	Middle Blocker
OH	Outside Hitter
OP	Opposite Hitter
L	Libero
(c)	Team Captain
HC	Head coach

=== Elimination round ===
==== Team standings ====
Pos	Team	Pld	W	L	Pts	SW	SL	SR	SPW	SPL	SPR	Qualification
1	NUNS Bullpups	14	13	1	37	39	10	3.900	97	89	1.090	Twice-to-beat in the semifinals
2	UE Junior Red Warriors	14	11	3	32	38	16	2.375	112	110	1.018	Twice-to-beat in the semifinals
3	FEU–D Baby Tamaraws (H)	14	10	4	30	35	16	2.188	75	48	1.563	Twice-to-win in the semifinals
4	UST Junior Golden Spikers	14	9	5	29	31	17	1.824	110	112	0.982	Twice-to-win in the semifinals
5	Adamson Baby Falcons	14	7	7	22	26	23	1.130	89	97	0.918	
6	DLSZ Junior Green Spikers	14	4	10	12	15	32	0.469	97	79	1.228	
7	UP Junior Fighting Maroons	14	2	12	6	8	38	0.211	79	97	0.814	
8	Ateneo Blue Eagles	14	0	14	0	2	42	0.048	48	75	0.640	

Source: UAAP Volleyball on Livestats
Rules for classification: 1) number of wins; 2) if tied for No. 2 or 4, one-game playoff; 3) match points; 4) sets ratio; 5) points ratio; 6) head-to-head record
(H) Host

==== Match-up results ====
	Round 1							Round 2						
Team ╲ Game	1	2	3	4	5	6	7	8	9	10	11	12	13	14
Adamson	NU school colors	UP school colors	UST school colors	FEU school colors	La Salle school colors	Ateneo school colors	UE school colors	UP school colors	NU school colors	Ateneo school colors	UST school colors	UE school colors	FEU school colors	La Salle school colors
Ateneo	FEU school colors	UE school colors	La Salle school colors	NU school colors	UST school colors	Adamson school colors	UP school colors	La Salle school colors	UST school colors	Adamson school colors	UE school colors	FEU school colors	NU school colors	UP school colors
DLSZ	UP school colors	NU school colors	Ateneo school colors	UST school colors	Adamson school colors	UE school colors	FEU school colors	Ateneo school colors	FEU school colors	UP school colors	NU school colors	UST school colors	UE school colors	Adamson school colors
FEU–D	Ateneo school colors	UST school colors	UP school colors	Adamson school colors	UE school colors	NU school colors	La Salle school colors	UST school colors	La Salle school colors	UE school colors	UP school colors	Ateneo school colors	Adamson school colors	NU school colors
NSNU	Adamson school colors	La Salle school colors	UE school colors	Ateneo school colors	UP school colors	FEU school colors	UST school colors	UE school colors	Adamson school colors	UST school colors	La Salle school colors	UP school colors	Ateneo school colors	FEU school colors
UE	UST school colors	Ateneo school colors	NU school colors	UP school colors	FEU school colors	La Salle school colors	Adamson school colors	NU school colors	UP school colors	FEU school colors	Ateneo school colors	Adamson school colors	La Salle school colors	UST school colors
UPIS	La Salle school colors	Adamson school colors	FEU school colors	UE school colors	NU school colors	UST school colors	Ateneo school colors	Adamson school colors	UE school colors	La Salle school colors	FEU school colors	NU school colors	UST school colors	Ateneo school colors
UST	UE school colors	FEU school colors	Adamson school colors	La Salle school colors	UP school colors	Ateneo school colors	NU school colors	FEU school colors	Ateneo school colors	NU school colors	Adamson school colors	La Salle school colors	UP school colors	UE school colors

Source: UAAP Volleyball on Livestats
= Win; = Loss

==== Game results ====
Results on top and to the right of the solid cells are for first-round games; those to the bottom and to the left of it are second-round games.

Teams	AdU	ADMU	DLSZ	FEU–D	NSNU	UE	UPIS	UST
Adamson Baby Falcons		3–0	3–0	1–3	1–3	0–3	3–0	0–3
Ateneo Blue Eagles	0–3		0–3	0–3	0–3	0–3	1–3	0–3
DLSZ Junior Green Spikers	1–3	3–0		0–3	0–3	0–3	3–1	0–3
FEU–D Baby Tamaraws	1–3	3–0	3–0		2–3	3–1	3–0	3–0
NUNS Bullpups	3–0	3–0	3–1	3–1		3–2	3–0	3–0
UE Junior Red Warriors	3–2	3–0	3–1	2–3	3–0		3–0	3–2
UP Junior Fighting Maroons	0–3	3–1	1–3	0–3	0–3	0–3		0–3
UST Junior Golden Spikers	3–1	3–0	3–0	3–1	0–3	2–3	3–0	

Source: UAAP Volleyball on Livestats
Legend: Blue = left column team win; Red = top row team win.

=== Bracket ===
Semifinals (Top 2 twice-to-beat)
1	NU	0	3
4	UST	3	1
2	UE	2	3
3	FEU	3	2

Final (Best-of-three series)
1	NUNS	2	0
2	UE	3	3

=== Semifinals ===
NUNS and UE have the twice-to-beat advantage. They only need to win once while their opponents twice in order to qualify in the Finals.

==== (1) NU vs. (4) UST ====
December 6, 2025; 9:00 AM	NUNS Bullpups	0–3	UST Tiger Cubs	Blue Eagle Gym; Attendance: 1,000+
December 6, 2025; 9:00 AM	(18–25, 21–25, 17–25)			Blue Eagle Gym; Attendance: 1,000+

December 8, 2025; 9:00 AM	NUNS Bullpups	3–1	UST Tiger Cubs	Blue Eagle Gym; Attendance: 1,000+
December 8, 2025; 9:00 AM	(25–22, 25–19, 23–25, 26–24)			Blue Eagle Gym; Attendance: 1,000+
December 8, 2025; 9:00 AM	NU wins series in two games			Blue Eagle Gym; Attendance: 1,000+

==== (2) UE vs. (3) FEU ====
December 6, 2025; 11:00 AM	UE Junior Red Warriors	2–3	FEU–D Baby Tamaraws	Blue Eagle Gym; Attendance: 1,000+
December 6, 2025; 11:00 AM	(25–20, 22–25, 23–25, 25–20, 9–15)			Blue Eagle Gym; Attendance: 1,000+

December 8, 2025; 11:00 AM	FEU–D Baby Tamaraws	2–3	UE Junior Red Warriors	Blue Eagle Gym; Attendance: 1,000+
December 8, 2025; 11:00 AM	(25–21, 22–25, 25–23, 19–25, 9–15)			Blue Eagle Gym; Attendance: 1,000+
December 8, 2025; 11:00 AM	UE wins series in two games			Blue Eagle Gym; Attendance: 1,000+

=== Finals ===
The finals is a best-of-three series.

December 11, 2025; 2:00 PM	NUNS Bullpups	2-3	UE Red Warriors	Blue Eagle Gym; Attendance: 2,000+
December 11, 2025; 2:00 PM	(22–25, 25–21, 18–25, 25–23, 13–15)			Blue Eagle Gym; Attendance: 2,000+

December 14, 2025; 2:00 PM	NUNS Bullpups	0–3	UE Junior Red Warriors	Blue Eagle Gym; Attendance: 2,000+
December 14, 2025; 2:00 PM	(26–28, 23–25, 19–25)			Blue Eagle Gym; Attendance: 2,000+
December 14, 2025; 2:00 PM	UE wins series, 2‐0			Blue Eagle Gym; Attendance: 2,000+

- Finals Most Valuable: Paul Roque (UE Junior Red Warriors)

=== Awards ===
UAAP Season 88 boys' volleyball champions
UE Junior Red Warriors
15th title

The awarding ceremony was held after Game 2 of the Finals series at Ateneo De Manila University Blue Eagle Gym on December 14, 2025.

- Most Valuable Player: Rainier Lorayes (UST Tiger Cubs)
- Finals Most Valuable Player: Paul Roque (UE Junior Red Warriors)
- Rookie of the Year: Justine Ray John Jusayan (UPIS Junior Fighting Maroons)
- 1st Best Outside Spiker: Rainier Lorayes (UST Tiger Cubs)
- 2nd Best Outside Spiker: Karl Melvin Escobar (UST Tiger Cubs)
- 1st Best Middle Blocker: Ronnie Millan (NUNS Bullpups)
- 2nd Best Middle Blocker: Ron Andrei De Vera (FEU–D Baby Tamaraws)
- Best Opposite Spiker: Xandrex Ragusta (UE Junior Red Warriors)
- Best Setter: Brix Landicho (FEU–D Baby Tamaraws)
- Best Libero: Jhon Guevarra (Adamson Baby Falcons)

== Girls' tournament ==
=== Team line-up ===
Adamson Lady Baby Falcons
No.	Name	Position
1		
2		
3		
4		
5		
6		
7		
8		
9		
10		
11		
12		
13		
14		
		HC

Ateneo Blue Eagles
No.	Name	Position
1	Gian Damian	
2	Avary Harris Lister	
3		
4		
5		
6		
7		
8		
9		
10		
11		
12		
13		
14		
	CASTILLO, Babes	HC

DLSZ Junior Lady Spikers
No.	Name	Position
1		
2		
3		
4		
5		
6		
7		
8		
9		
10		
11		
12		
13		
14		
		HC

FEU–D Lady Baby Tamaraws
No.	Name	Position
1		
2		
3		
4		
5		
6		
7		
8		
9		
10		
11		
12		
13		
14		
		HC

NUNS Lady Bullpups
No.	Name	Position
1		
2		
3		
4		
5		
6		
7		
8		
9		
10		
11		
12		
13		
14		
		HC

UE Junior Lady Warriors
No.	Name	Position
1	Leighnielle Ann Suy	
2	Hana Ashtine Lie	
3	Bea Triszhe Ava	
4	Francesca Kate Marin	
5		
6		
7		
8		
9		
10		
11		
12		
13		
14		
		HC

UP Junior Fighting Maroons
No.	Name	Position
1		
2		
3		
4		
5		
6		
7		
8		
9		
10		
11		
12		
13		
14		
	GUHIT, Jerome	HC

UST Junior Golden Tigresses
No.	Name	Position
1		
2		
3		
4		
5		
6		
7		
8		
9		
10		
11		
12		
13		
14		
	REYES, Emilio Jr.	HC

Legend
S	Setter
MB	Middle Blocker
OH	Outside Hitter
OP	Opposite Hitter
L	Libero
(c)	Team Captain
HC	Head coach

=== Elimination round ===
==== Team standings ====
Pos	Team	Pld	W	L	Pts	SW	SL	SR	SPW	SPL	SPR	Qualification
1	NUNS Lady Bullpups	14	13	1	39	41	7	5.857	104	99	1.051	Twice-to-beat in the semifinals
2	Adamson Lady Baby Falcons	14	13	1	37	39	9	4.333	75	54	1.389	Twice-to-beat in the semifinals
3	FEU–D Lady Baby Tamaraws (H)	14	9	5	27	30	17	1.765	54	75	0.720	Twice-to-win in the semifinals
4	UST Junior Golden Tigresses	14	8	6	26	32	20	1.600	99	104	0.952	Twice-to-win in the semifinals
5	DLSZ Junior Lady Spikers	14	7	7	21	24	23	1.043	75	50	1.500	
6	UP Junior Fighting Maroons	14	4	10	11	13	33	0.394	75	50	1.500	
7	Ateneo Blue Eagles	14	1	13	4	7	39	0.179	50	75	0.667	
8	UE Junior Lady Warriors	14	1	13	3	3	40	0.075	50	75	0.667	

Source: UAAP Volleyball on Livestats
Rules for classification: 1) number of wins; 2) if tied for No. 2 or 4, one-game playoff; 3) match points; 4) sets ratio; 5) points ratio; 6) head-to-head record
(H) Host

==== Match-up results ====
	Round 1							Round 2						
Team ╲ Game	1	2	3	4	5	6	7	8	9	10	11	12	13	14
Adamson	FEU school colors	UP school colors	UST school colors	Ateneo school colors	UE school colors	La Salle school colors	NU school colors	UST school colors	La Salle school colors	FEU school colors	UP school colors	Ateneo school colors	UE school colors	NU school colors
Ateneo	La Salle school colors	UST school colors	UP school colors	Adamson school colors	NU school colors	FEU school colors	UE school colors	La Salle school colors	UST school colors	UP school colors	NU school colors	Adamson school colors	FEU school colors	UE school colors
DLSZ	Ateneo school colors	NU school colors	UE school colors	FEU school colors	UST school colors	Adamson school colors	UP school colors	Ateneo school colors	Adamson school colors	UE school colors	FEU school colors	UST school colors	NU school colors	UP school colors
FEU–D	Adamson school colors	UE school colors	NU school colors	La Salle school colors	UP school colors	Ateneo school colors	UST school colors	NU school colors	UE school colors	Adamson school colors	La Salle school colors	UP school colors	Ateneo school colors	UST school colors
NSNU	UST school colors	La Salle school colors	FEU school colors	UP school colors	Ateneo school colors	UE school colors	Adamson school colors	FEU school colors	UP school colors	UST school colors	Ateneo school colors	UE school colors	La Salle school colors	Adamson school colors
UE	UP school colors	FEU school colors	La Salle school colors	UST school colors	Adamson school colors	NU school colors	Ateneo school colors	UP school colors	FEU school colors	La Salle school colors	UST school colors	NU school colors	Adamson school colors	Ateneo school colors
UPIS	UE school colors	Adamson school colors	Ateneo school colors	NU school colors	FEU school colors	UST school colors	La Salle school colors	UE school colors	Ateneo school colors	NU school colors	Adamson school colors	FEU school colors	UST school colors	La Salle school colors
UST	NU school colors	Ateneo school colors	Adamson school colors	UE school colors	UP school colors	La Salle school colors	FEU school colors	Adamson school colors	Ateneo school colors	NU school colors	UE school colors	La Salle school colors	UP school colors	FEU school colors

Source: UAAP Volleyball on Livestats
= Win; = Loss

==== Game results ====
Results on top and to the right of the solid cells are for first-round games; those to the bottom and to the left of it are second-round games.

Teams	AdU	ADMU	DLSZ	FEU–D	NSNU	UE	UPIS	UST
Adamson Lady Baby Falcons		3–0	3–0	3–0	3–2	3–0	3–0	3–2
Ateneo Blue Eagles	0–3		0–3	0–3	0–3	3–0	2–3	0–3
DLSZ Junior Lady Spikers	0–3	3–0		3–1	0–3	3–0	3–1	1–3
FEU–D Lady Baby Tamaraws	1–3	3–0	3–0		1–3	3–0	3–0	3–1
NUNS Lady Bullpups	3–0	3–0	3–1	3–0		3–0	3–0	3–1
UE Junior Lady Warriors	0–3	3–1	0–3	0–3	0–3		0–3	0–3
UPIS Junior Fighting Maroons	0–3	3–1	0–3	0–3	0–3	3–0		0–3
UST Junior Golden Tigresses	1–3	3–0	3–1	1–3	2–3	3–0	3–0	

Source: UAAP Volleyball on Livestats
Legend: Blue = left column team win; Red = top row team win.

=== Bracket ===
Semifinals (Top 2 twice-to-beat)
1	NUNS	3
4	UST	1
2	Adamson	2	2
3	FEU	3	3

Final (Best-of-three series)
1	NUNS	3	3
3	FEU	2	0

=== Semifinals ===
NUNS and Adamson have the twice-to-beat advantage. They only need to win once while their opponents twice in order to qualify in the Finals.

==== (1) NUNS vs. (4) UST ====
December 6, 2025; 1:00 PM	NUNS Lady Bullpups	3–1	UST Junior Tigresses	Blue Eagle Gym; Attendance: 1,500+
December 6, 2025; 1:00 PM	(33–31, 25–22, 20–25, 25–18)			Blue Eagle Gym; Attendance: 1,500+
December 6, 2025; 1:00 PM	NUNS wins series in one game			Blue Eagle Gym; Attendance: 1,500+

==== (2) Adamson vs. (3) FEU ====
December 6, 2025; 3:00 PM	Adamson Lady Baby Falcons	2–3	FEU–D Lady Baby Tamaraws	Blue Eagle Gym; Attendance: 1,500+
December 6, 2025; 3:00 PM	(22–25, 25–18, 25–23, 25–27, 7–15)			Blue Eagle Gym; Attendance: 1,500+

December 8, 2025; 1:00 PM	Adamson Lady Baby Falcons	2–3	FEU–D Lady Baby Tamaraws	Blue Eagle Gym; Attendance: 1,500+
December 8, 2025; 1:00 PM	(25–14, 25–22, 18–25, 25–27, 6–15)			Blue Eagle Gym; Attendance: 1,500+
December 8, 2025; 1:00 PM	FEU-D wins series in two games			Blue Eagle Gym; Attendance: 1,500+

=== Finals ===
The finals is a best-of-three series.

December 11, 2024; 4:30 PM	NUNS Lady Bullpups	3-2	FEU–D Lady Baby Tamaraws	Blue Eagle Gym; Attendance: 2,000+
December 11, 2024; 4:30 PM	(26–24, 21–25, 25–18, 23–25, 18–16			Blue Eagle Gym; Attendance: 2,000+

December 14, 2025; 9:00 AM	NUNS Lady Bullpups	3–0	FEU–D Lady Baby Tamaraws	Blue Eagle Gym; Attendance: 2,000+
December 14, 2025; 9:00 AM	(25–19, 25–17, 25–15)			Blue Eagle Gym; Attendance: 2,000+
December 14, 2025; 9:00 AM	NUNS wins series 2‐0			Blue Eagle Gym; Attendance: 2,000+

- Finals Most Valuable: Rain Navarro (NUNS Lady Bullpups)

=== Awards ===
UAAP Season 88 girls' volleyball champions
NUNS Lady Bullpups
Eighth title

The awarding ceremony was held after Game 2 of the Finals series at Ateneo De Manila University Blue Eagle Gym on December 14, 2025.

- Most Valuable Player: Diza Marie Berayo (NUNS Lady Bullpups)
- Finals Most Valuable Player: Rain Navarro (NUNS Lady Bullpups)
- Rookie of the Year: Jhaynna Love Bulandres (NUNS Lady Bullpups)
- 1st Best Outside Spiker: Diza Marie Berayo (NUNS Lady Bullpups)
- 2nd Best Outside Spiker: Kimberly Rubin (UST Junior Tigresses)
- 1st Best Middle Blocker: Cathlyn Umal (FEU–D Lady Baby Tamaraws)
- 2nd Best Middle Blocker: Anya Callo (UPIS Junior Lady Maroons)
- Best Opposite Spiker: Ifnanya Udeagbala (FEU–D Lady Baby Tamaraws)
- Best Setter: Sabina Mikaela Valdez (Zobel Junior Lady Archers)
- Best Libero: Mariana Pineda (Adamson Lady Baby Falcons)

== Overall championship points ==
=== Seniors' division ===
Team	Men	Women	Total
Adamson Soaring Falcons	2	8	10
Ateneo Blue Eagles	8	2	10
De La Salle Green Archers	6	15	21
FEU Tamaraws	12	6	18
NU Bulldogs	15	12	27
UE Red Warriors	4	1	5
UP Fighting Maroons	1	4	5
UST Growling Tigers	10	10	20

=== Juniors' division ===
Team	Boys'	Girls'	Points
Adamson Baby Falcons	6	10	16
Ateneo Blue Eagles	1	2	3
Zobel Junior Archers	4	6	10
FEU–D Baby Tamaraws	10	12	22
NUNS Bullpups	12	15	27
UE Junior Red Warriors	15	1	16
UPIS Junior Fighting Maroons	2	4	6
UST Tiger Cubs	8	8	16

Pts.	Ranking
15	Champion
12	2nd
10	3rd
8	4th
6	5th
4	6th
2	7th
1	8th
—	Did not join

In case of a tie, the team with the higher position in any tournament is ranked higher. If both are still tied, they are listed by alphabetical order.

How rankings are determined:

- Ranks 5th to 8th determined by elimination round rankings.
- Semifinals losers ranked by elimination round rankings
- Loser of the finals is ranked 2nd
- Champion is ranked 1st

== See also ==
- NCAA Season 101 volleyball tournaments

Preceded by Season 87 (2025)	UAAP volleyball tournaments Season 88 (2026)	Succeeded by Season 89 (2027)
