= Leo Aringo =

Filipino volleyball player (born 2001)

Personal information
- Nationality: Filipino
- Born: Leo O. Aringo Jr. January 25, 2001 (age 25); Davao City, Philippines
- Height: 1.90 m (6 ft 3 in)
- Weight: 78 kg (172 lb)
- Education: National University

Volleyball information
- Position: Outside hitter
- Current club: AEP Cabstars

Career
Years	Teams
2025–2026	Saitama Azalea
2026–	AEP Cabstars

Leo O. Aringo Jr. is a Filipino volleyball player who plays for the AEP Cabstars of the Spikers' Turf.

== Early life and education ==
Leo O. Aringo Jr. was born on January 25, 2001, in Davao City, Philippines. He attended the Davao City National High School before moving to Manila to study at the National University in Manila.

== Career ==
=== Early years ===
Aringo played for the varsity team of Davao City National High School. At the 2019 Palarong Pambansa he helped his hometown's team win the men's volleyball bronze.

=== College ===
An outside hitter, Aringo played for the NU Bulldogs in the University Athletic Association of the Philippines. He started at the bench in Season 82 in 2019, however the COVID-19 pandemic disrupted the whole league for the next few years.

Play resumed in Season 85, with Aringo returning to the NU Bulldogs bench competing the starting position with Buds Buddin and Nico Almendras. He faced fitness issues in his bid to become a consistent starter.

In the lead up to the UAAP Season 86, Aringo was fielded as an opposite hitter in the off-season tournaments like the 2023 Spikers' Turf Invitational Conference and the 2023 V-League Collegiate Challenge.

In the UAAP Season 87 in 2025, Aringo was named team captain. He helped his team earn its five consecutive UAAP championships, three of which where he was personally part of the squad. He was also named Finals MVP. He was eligible for UAAP Season 88 but waived his final playing year.

The core of the NU Bulldogs, including Aringo, formed part of the Philippine national team which took part at the 2025 Summer World University Games.

=== Club ===
After college, Aringo signed with Saitama Azalea of the Japanese V.League for the 2025–26 season.

Aringo returned to the Philippines to play for the AEP Cabstars of the Spikers' Turf in the 2026 Invitational Conference.

== Awards ==
=== Individual ===
Year	League	Season	Award	Ref
2025	UAAP	87	Finals MVP	

=== Collegiate ===
Year	League	Season / Conference	Title	Ref
2023	UAAP	85	Champions	
2024	V-League	Collegiate Challenge	3rd Place	
2024	UAAP	86	Champions	
2025	UAAP	87	Champions	

=== Clubs ===
Year	League	Conference	Club	Title	Ref
2023	Spikers' Turf	Invitational	Sta Elena–NU	Champions	
