= Peng Taguibolos =

Filipino volleyball player

Personal information
- Full name: Rwenzmel M. Taguibolos
- Nickname: Peng
- Nationality: Filipino
- Born: October 16, 2001 (age 25) Concepcion, Tarlac, Philippines
- Home town: Capas, Tarlac
- Education: National University
- Height: 195 cm (6 ft 5 in)
- Weight: 84 kg (185 lb)

Volleyball information
- Position: Middle blocker

Career
- Years: Team
- 2021: VNS Manileño Spikers

National team
- Years: Team
- 2023–: Philippines
Honours
Men's volleyball
Representing Philippines
SEA Games
Bronze medal – third place	2025 Thailand	Team
SEA V.League
Bronze medal – third place	2024 Manila	Team
Bronze medal – third place	2024 Yogyakarta	Team

Rwenzmel "Peng" M. Taguibolos (born October 16, 2001) is a Filipino volleyball player who plays for the NU Bulldogs of the University Athletic Association of the Philippines (UAAP).

== Early life ==
Rwenzmel "Peng" M. Taguibolos was born in Concepcion, Tarlac on October 16, 2001. Hailing from Capas, Taguibolos moved to Manila upon the convincing of his maternal grandfather Ambo.

== Career ==
=== High school ===
Taguibolos played for the Arellano Braves at the junior division of the National Collegiate Athletic Association (NCAA). He initially joined the basketball team as a center before also becoming part of the volleyball team in his senior year.

=== College ===
The COVID-19 pandemic caused a disruption leading him to focus on volleyball after he was convinced by NU Bulldogs coach Dante Alinsunurin. He first joined the Bulldogs at the 2023 Spikers' Turf Open Conference. He made his University Athletic Association of the Philippines (UAAP) debut in Season 86 in 2024. He has helped the team win two UAAP titles.

=== Club ===
Taguibolos played for the VNS Griffins in the 2021 PNVF Champions League where he was named Second Best Middle Blocker.

=== National team ===
Taguibolos has played for the Philippines national team. He debuted for the team at the 2023 SEA Games. He won two bronze medals at the 2024 SEA Men's V.League, He was part of the final squad of the Philippines for the 2025 FIVB Men's Volleyball World Championship which the country hosted. He helped his team won a bronze at the 2025 SEA Games in Thailand.
