= Niña Ytang =

Filipino volleyball player

Personal information
- Nationality: Filipino
- Born: January 24, 2002 (age 24); Cebu, Philippines
- Hometown: Liloan, Cebu
- Height: 5 ft 9 in (1.75 m)
- Spike: 305 cm (120 in)
- Education: University of the Philippines (2022–2026)

Volleyball information
- Position: Middle Blocker

National team
2023–present	Philippines

Niña Ytang (born January 24, 2002) is a Filipina volleyball player. She last played for the UP Fighting Maroons in the UAAP.

== Early life and education ==
Niña Ytang was born on January 24, 2002 in Cebu. Ytang was initially known in her basic education years as a singer rather than as a volleyball player. She hails from the town of Liloan, although she is also associated with Bantayan.

She studied at the Arcelo Memorial National High School in Liloan, and in her third year of high school was recruited to the girls volleyball team due to her height. She accepted the offer to be able to study for free under a scholarship. She later went to Metro Manila to study at the University of the Philippines Diliman.

== Career ==
=== Collegiate ===
Ytang was scouted to play for the UP Fighting Maroons in the University Athletic Association of the Philippines (UAAP). She was noticed during her participation in her eleventh grade at the Central Visayas Regional Athletics Association (CVRAA) championship in Cebu by coach Godfrey Okumu who was originally intended just to recruit Steph Bustrillo.

Ytang plays as the Middle Blocker of the team.

She won the 2nd Best Middle Blocker Award four times in the UAAP in Season 85, Season 86, Season 87, and Season 88.

In 2025, she scored a career-high of 30 points against the unbeaten and defending champions, National University Lady Bulldogs. This is the first 30-point scored ever by a Middle Blocker since Jaja Santiago in 2017 - Season 80 and 30-point score by a Fighting Maroon since Tots Carlos' 32 points in 2017 - Season 80.

=== Club ===
Ytang entered the 2026 draft of the Premier Volleyball League. However she withdrew from the draft to focus on her role as a national team player.

== National team ==
Ytang has played for the Philippine national team. She was part of the squad which took part in the 2023 Asian Women's Volleyball Championship, 2023 SEA Women's V.League.

She later played at the 2026 AVC Women's Volleyball Cup in Candon.

== Awards ==
=== Individual ===
Year	League	Season/Conference	Award	Ref
2023	UAAP	Season 85	2nd Best Middle Blocker	
2024	UAAP	Season 86	2nd Best Middle Blocker	
2025	UAAP	Season 87	2nd Best Middle Blocker	
2026	UAAP	Season 88	2nd Best Middle Blocker	
