= Angge Poyos =

Filipino volleyball player

Angeline Poyos

Personal information
- Full name: Angeline Inson Poyos
- Nationality: Filipino
- Born: January 17, 2004 (age 22)
- Hometown: Balilihan, Bohol, Philippines
- Height: 1.68 m (5 ft 6 in)
- Education: University of Santo Tomas

Volleyball information
- Position: Outside Hitter
- Current team: UST Golden Tigresses
- Number: 17

Angeline Inson Poyos (born January 17, 2004) is a Filipino volleyball player. She currently plays for the UST Golden Tigresses collegiate women's varsity team in UAAP.

== Personal life ==
Poyos is a native of Balilihan, Bohol. She is currently taking a bachelor's degree in Sports Studies at the University of Santo Tomas.

== Career ==
Poyos first appeared with the UST Golden Tigresses in the 2023 Shakey's Super League National Invitationals, where they earned a bronze medal. This was followed by the 2023 Shakey's Super League Collegiate Pre-Season Championship, with the team finishing as the first runner-up.

Poyos made her UAAP debut with the UST Golden Tigresses in Season 86, immediately making impressions as she scored 31 points in one match, setting a new scoring record for a first-year player in the history of UAAP Women's Volleyball.

On May 12, 2024, the UST Golden Tigresses reached the finals and faced the NU Lady Bulldogs, where Poyos sustained a sprained ankle during the second set and was absent for the rest of Game 1. On May 15, she was cleared to return for Game 2 but was pulled out halfway through the first set due to her injury affecting her performance. The UST Golden Tigresses earned the silver medal, while Poyos received the Rookie of the Year award and was recognized as the second-best Outside Hitter, as well as being the second highest scorer in the entire tournament.

== Awards ==
=== Individuals ===
Year	League	Season/Conference	Awards	Ref
2023	SSL	Invitationals	1st Best Outside Spiker	
2023	SSL	Pre-Season	2nd Best Outside Spiker	
2024	UAAP	86	Rookie of the Year	
2024	UAAP	86	2nd Best Outside Spiker	
2024	SSL	Pre-Season	2nd Best Outside Spiker	
2024	V-League	Collegiate	Conference Most Valuable Player	
2025	Marinera Cup	Collegiate	Finals Most Valuable Player	

=== Collegiate ===
==== UST Golden Tigresses ====
Year	League	Season/Conference	Title	Ref
2023	SSL	Invitationals	3rd place	
2023	SSL	Pre-Season	Runner-up	
2024	UAAP	86	Runner-up	
2024	V-League	Collegiate	Champion	
2025	UAAP	87	3rd place	
2025	SSL	Pre-Season	Runner-up	
2025	Marinera Cup	Collegiate	Champion	
2026	UAAP	88	3rd place	
