= Mike Alinsunurin =

Filipino volleyball player

Personal information
- Nationality: Filipino
- Education: Adamson University

Mike Ronilo Alinsunurin was a Filipino volleyball player.

== Career ==
=== Adamson Falcons ===
Alinsunurin paired with Sherwin Meneses and the Adamson duo won the 10th Nestea Beach Volleyball crown in Boracay.

Nestea awarded Alinsunurin the men's division most valuable player (MVP).

== Death ==
Mike died on May 6, 2025, according to his brother Dante Alinsunurin.
