= NU Bulldogs volleyball =

Team of National University, Philippines

NU Bulldogs
- University: National University
- Nickname: Bulldogs
- Location: 551 M. F. Jhocson St., Sampaloc, Manila, Philippines
- Head coach: Dante Alinsunurin
- Captain: Peng Taguibolos

Main league
- League: UAAP
- Season 88 (2026): 3rd place

Other league/s
- League: Spikers' Turf
- Competes as: FEU-DN Steel Tamaraws
- 2025 Invitational: 8th place

Championships
- UAAP: 8

The NU Bulldogs volleyball program is the men's collegiate varsity volleyball team of the National University. The team competes in the University Athletic Association of the Philippines (UAAP).

== History ==
The National University Bulldogs won their first UAAP volleyball title in UAAP Season 75 (2012–2013). As of UAAP Season 88 NU Bulldogs have won 8 titles UAAP Season 75 (2013), UAAP Season 76 (2014), UAAP Season 80 (2018), UAAP Season 81 (2019), UAAP Season 85 (2023), UAAP Season 86 (2024), UAAP Season 87 (2025), UAAP Season 88 (2026).

The Bulldogs took part in the 2017 Open Conference of the league now known as Spikers' Turf. Their participation was sponsored by Sta. Elena Construction with the team playing as the Megabuilders Volley Bolts. The team would continue competing in Spikers' Turf under the Sta. Elena sponsorship as the Sta. Elena Ball Hammers, with their most recent participation coming in 2023.

The NU Bulldogs also represented the Philippines at the World University Games. They finished fourteenth out of fifteen nations at the 2025 Summer World University Games in Germany.

== Current roster ==
=== NU Bulldogs men's volleyball team ===
UAAP Season 85 roster
Number	Player	Position	Height	Birth date	High School
1	Nico Almendras	Outside Hitter	1.90 m (6 ft 3 in)	July 27, 1999 (age 27)	
2	Clarenz Belostrino	Setter	5 ft 10 in (1.78 m)	November 10, 2001 (age 24)	NU Nazareth School
5	Kyle Ramones	Middle Blocker			
6	Buds Buddin	Outside Hitter	6 ft 1 in (1.85 m)	June 27, 2001 (age 25)	NU Nazareth School
8	Mano Sumagui	Libero			
9	Luis Lumanlan	Middle Blocker			
10	Obed Mukaba	Middle Blocker	2.00 m (6 ft 7 in)	November 28, 2002 (age 23)	
11	Kennry Malinis	Opposite Hitter			
13	Owa Retamar (c)	Setter	1.86 m (6 ft 1 in)	March 7, 2000 (age 26)	
16	Bryan James Jaleco	Libero			NU Nazareth School
18	Leo Aringo	Outside Hitter	6 ft 3 in (1.91 m)	January 25, 2001 (age 25)	Davao City National
20	Joseph Bello	Setter			UE
22	Michael Fortuna	Opposite Hitter	6 ft 0 in (1.83 m)	July 10, 2001 (age 25)	NU Nazareth School
23	Choi Diao	Middle Blocker			

== Previous roster ==
=== UAAP Champions ===
UAAP Season 75 roster
OH - • 5 Leonardo Medrano • 9 Rueben Inaudito (c) • 10 Fauzi Ismail • 14 Jan Berlin Paglinawan
OPP - • 7 John Paul Padua • 18 Edwin Tolentino
MB - • 4 Peter Torres • 8 Axel Leonard Santiago • 11 Reyson Fuentes • 16 Ruben Baysac
S - • 1 Joshua Noel Cagas • 3 Sonny Marc Tekiko • 12 Vince Mangulabnan
L - • 6 Josephenry Tipay • 15 Mark Benzon Dizon

UAAP Season 76 roster
OH - • 5 Leonardo Medrano • 9 Rueben Inaudito (c) • 10 Fauzi Ismail • 14 Jan Berlin Paglinawan
OPP - • 13 Madzlan Gampong • 18 Edwin Tolentino
MB - • 4 Peter Torres • 8 Rashdi Talipan • 11 Reyson Fuentes • 16 Ruben Baysac
S - • 1 Vince Mangulabnan • 3 Sonny Marc Tekiko
L - • 6 Josephenry Tipay • 15 Mark Benzon Dizon

UAAP Season 80 roster
OH - • 1 Bryan Bagunas • 5 Krisvan Ponti • 6 Banjo Mondero • 9 James Natividad • 10 Fauzi Ismail
OPP - • 18 Madzlan Gampong
MB - • 12 Francis Philip Saura (c) • 14 Berhashidin Daymil • 17 Kim Malabunga •
S - • 2 John Paulo Ancheta • 3 Kim Harold Dayandante
L - 8 Mano Sumagui • 15 Ricky Marcos

UAAP Season 81 roster
OH - • 1 Bryan Bagunas • 5 Krisvan Ponti • 6 Banjo Mondero • 9 James Natividad
OPP - • 7 Nico Almendras • 18 Madzlan Gampong
MB - • 12 Francis Saura (c) • 14 Berhashidin Daymil • 17 Kim Malabunga •
S - • 2 John Paulo Ancheta
L - • 15 Ricky Marcos • Marco Ely Maclang

UAAP Season 85 roster
OH - • 1 Nico Almendras (c) • 6 Buds Buddin • 18 Leo Aringo
OPP - • 11 Kennry Malinis • 22 Michael Fortuna
MB - • 5 Kyle Ramones • 9 Luis Lumanlan • 10 Obed Mukaba • 23 Choi Diao
S - • 2 Clarenz Belostrino • 13 Owa Retamar • 20 Joseph Bello
L - • 8 Mano Sumagui • 16 Bryan James Jaleco

=== Spikers' Turf/PVL ===
2018 PVL Collegiate Conference roster
OH - • 1 Bryan Bagunas • 5 Krisvan Ponti • 6 Banjo Mondero • 9 James Natividad • 10 Fauzi Ismail
OPP - • 18 Madzlan Gampong
MB - • 12 Francis Philip Saura (c) • 14 Berhashidin Daymil • 17 Kim Malabunga •
S - • 2 John Paulo Ancheta • 3 Kim Harold Dayandante • 18 Owa Retamar
L - 8 Mano Sumagui • 15 Ricky Marcos

== Team honors ==
UAAP (5)

NU Bulldogs
Year	Season	Title	Ref
2012-2013	UAAP Season 75	Champions	
2013–2014	UAAP Season 76	Champions	
2018–2019	UAAP Season 80	Champions	
2019–2020	UAAP Season 81	Champions	
2022–2023	UAAP Season 85	Champions	
2023–2024	UAAP Season 86	Champions	
2025–2025	UAAP Season 87	Champions	
2025–2026	UAAP Season 88	Champions	

=== Other Collegiate | National | Invitational leagues ===
NU Bulldogs
Year	Tournament	Title	Ref
2015	Spikers' Turf 1st Season Collegiate Conference	Runner-up	
2016	Spikers' Turf 2nd Season Collegiate Conference	Runner-up	
2018	2018 PVL Collegiate Conference	Champions	
2018	2018 ASEAN University Games	Champions	
2022	2022 V League	Champions	
2022	2022 Spikers’ Turf Open Conference	Champions	
2023	2023 Spikers’ Turf Invitational Conference	Champions	

== Individual honors ==
=== UAAP ===
NU Bulldogs
Year	UAAP Season	Award	Player	Ref
2009–2010	72	Best Receiver	Richard Rosero	
2010–2011	73	Rookie of the Year	Peter Torres	
2011–2012	74	Rookie of the Year	Vince Mangulabnan	
2011–2012	74	Best Attacker	Peter Torres	
2011–2012	74	Best Blocker	Rueben Inaudito	
2012–2013	75	Most Valuable Player (Finals)	Peter Torres	
2012–2013	75	Best Attacker	Peter Torres	
2012–2013	75	Best Setter	Vince Mangulabnan	
2013–2014	76	Most Valuable Player (Finals)	Rueben Inaudito	
2014–2015	77	Best Blocker	Peter Torres	
2014–2015	77	Best Server	Vince Mangulabnan	
2015–2016	78	Rookie of the Year	James Natividad	
2015–2016	78	Best Digger	Ricky Marcos	
2016–2017	79	Best Server	Bryan Bagunas	
2016–2017	79	Best Digger	Ricky Marcos	
2017–2018	80	Most Valuable Player (Finals)	Bryan Bagunas	
2018–2019	81	Most Valuable Player (Season)	Bryan Bagunas	
2018–2019	81	1st Best Outside Hitter	Bryan Bagunas	
2018–2019	81	Best Server	Bryan Bagunas	
2018–2019	81	Rookie of the Year	Nico Almendras	
2018–2019	81	Best Opposite Hitter	James Natividad	
2022–2023	85	Most Valuable Player (Finals)	Owa Retamar	
2022–2023	85	Best Setter	Owa Retamar	
2022–2023	85	2nd Best Outside Hitter	Buds Buddin	
2022–2023	85	1st Best Middle Blocker	Obed Mukaba	
2023–2024	86	Most Valuable Player (Finals)	Owa Retamar	
2023–2024	86	Best Setter	Owa Retamar	
2023–2024	86	2nd Best Outside Spiker	Nico Almendras	
2023–2024	86	Rookie of the Year	Jade Alex Disquitado	

== Records by season ==
Records starting UAAP Season 56

NU Bulldogs records by season
Year	UAAP Season	Title	Team captain	Won or Lost to (finalist or higher rank)
1993–1994	56	7th place		UE Red Warriors
1994–1995	57	7th place		Ateneo Blue Eagles
1995–1996	58	6th place		UE Red Warriors
1996–1997	59	7th place		Adamson Soaring Falcons
1997–1998	60	6th place		UE Red Warriors
1998–1999	61	4th place		De La Salle Green Archers
1999–2000	62	7th place		UP Fighting Maroons
2000–2001	63	3rd Place		
2001–2002	64	5th place		
2002–2003	65	7th place		
2003–2004	66	7th place		
2004–2005	67	7th place		
2005–2006	68	7th place		
2006–2007	69	4th place		
2007–2008	70	8th place		
2008–2009	71	8th place		
2009–2010	72	7th place		
2010–2011	73	7th place	Ariel Kenneth Baloaloa	
2011–2012	74	5th place	Joshua Cagas	
2012–2013	75	Champions	Reuben Inaudito	FEU Tamaraws
2013–2014	76	Champions	Reuben Inaudito	Ateneo Blue Eagles
2014–2015	77	Runners-up	Reuben Inaudito	Ateneo Blue Eagles
2015–2016	78	Runners-up	Vince Mangulabnan	Ateneo Blue Eagles
2016–2017	79	Runners-up	Francis Saura	Ateneo Blue Eagles
2017–2018	80	Champions	Francis Saura	Ateneo Blue Eagles
2018–2019	81	Champions	Francis Saura	FEU Tamaraws
2019–2020	82	cancelled	James Natividad	
2020–2021	83	cancelled		
2021–2022	84	cancelled		
2022–2023	85	Champions	Owa Retamar	UST Growling Tigers
2023–2024	86	Champions	Owa Retamar	UST Growling Tigers
2024–2025	87	Champions	Leo Aringo	FEU Tamaraws
2025–2026	88	Champions	Peng Taguibolos	FEU Tamaraws

== Head coaches ==
- UAAP Season 73–present: (Philippines) Dante Alinsunurin

== Notable players ==
- (Philippines) Owa Retamar (S)
- (Philippines) Kim Dayandante (S)
- (Philippines) Vince Mangulabnan (S)
- (Philippines) Ricky Marcos (L)
- (Philippines) Dante Alinsunurin (MB)
- (Philippines) Francis Saura (MB)
- (Philippines) Kim Malabunga (MB)
- (Philippines) Peter Torres (MB)
- (Philippines) Bryan Bagunas (OH)
- (Philippines) Nico Almendras (OH)
- (Philippines) Edwin Tolentino (OH/OP)
- (Philippines) Fauzi Ismail (OH/OP)
- (Philippines) Berlin Paglinawan (OH/OP)
- (Philippines) Edward Camposano (OP)
- (Philippines) Madz Gampong (OP)

Legend
S	Setter
L	Libero
MB	Middle Blocker
OS	Outside Hitter
OP	Opposite Hitter

== See also ==
- National University
- NU Lady Bulldogs volleyball
- NU Bulldogs
