= UAAP Season 86 volleyball tournaments =

Volleyball tournaments

UAAP Season 86
- Fueling the Future
- Host school: University of the East (Season and collegiate); Adamson University (High school)
Men's Finals	G1	G2	Wins
NU Bulldogs	3	3	2
UST Golden Spikers	0	1	0
- Duration: May 11–15, 2024
- Arena(s): Araneta Coliseum (Game 1); SM Mall of Asia Arena (Game 2)
- Finals MVP: Ave Joshua Retamar
- Winning coach: Dante Alinsunurin
- Semifinalists: FEU Tamaraws; De La Salle Green Spikers
- TV network(s): One Sports; UAAP Varsity Channel
Women's Finals	G1	G2	Wins
NU Lady Bulldogs	3	3	2
UST Golden Tigresses	0	1	0
- Duration: May 11–15, 2024
- Arena(s): Araneta Coliseum (Game 1); SM Mall of Asia Arena (Game 2)
- Finals MVP: Alyssa Jae Solomon
- Winning coach: Norman Miguel
- Semifinalists: De La Salle Lady Spikers; FEU Lady Tamaraws
- TV network(s): One Sports; UAAP Varsity Channel
Boys' Finals	G1	G2	G3	Wins
NUNS Bullpups	3	2	3	2
UE Junior Red Warriors	1	3	1	1
- Duration: February 6–12, 2024
- Arena(s): Filoil EcoOil Centre
- Finals MVP: Jeff Gallego
- Winning coach: Edgar Barroga
- Semifinalists: FEU–D Baby Tamaraws; UST Tiger Cubs
Girls' Finals	G1	G2	Wins
Adamson Lady Baby Falcons	3	3	2
NUNS Lady Bullpups	0	0	0
- Duration: February 8–12, 2024
- Arena(s): Filoil EcoOil Centre
- Finals MVP: Shaina Nitura
- Winning coach: JP Yude
- Semifinalists: UST Junior Tigresses; FEU–D Lady Baby Tamaraws

The UAAP Season 86 volleyball tournaments were the University Athletic Association of the Philippines (UAAP) volleyball tournaments for the 2023–24 school year.

The collegiate men's and women's tournaments began on February 17, 2024.

The high school boys' and girls' tournaments began on November 4, 2023.

For the first time in the Final Four history of the UAAP collegiate volleyball tournaments, a fourth-seeded team has qualified to the championship series after the UST Golden Spikers overcame the twice-to-beat team, FEU Tamaraws, in the semifinal series. This season also marks the first double UAAP Finals matchup of the same schools in the collegiate volleyball tournaments in the 21st century, after both men's and women's teams of NU and UST qualified to the championship round.

== Teams ==
All eight member universities of the UAAP fielded teams in the collegiate division while 8 universities fielded teams in the boys' and girls' division, respectively.

Collegiate division
University	Men		Women	
University	Team	Coach	Team	Coach
Adamson University (AdU)	Soaring Falcons	George Pascua	Lady Falcons	JP Yude
Ateneo de Manila University (ADMU)	Blue Eagles	Timothy Sto. Tomas	Blue Eagles	Sergio Veloso
De La Salle University (DLSU)	Green Spikers	Jose Roque	Lady Spikers	Ramil De Jesus and Noel Orcullo
Far Eastern University (FEU)	Tamaraws	Eddieson Orcullo	Lady Tamaraws	Manolo Refugia
National University (NU)	Bulldogs	Dante Alinsunurin	Lady Bulldogs	Norman Miguel
University of the East (UE)	Red Warriors	Jerome Guhit	Lady Red Warriors	Jerry Yee (suspended from March 2024; replaced on interim by Obet Vital)
University of the Philippines Diliman (UP)	Fighting Maroons	Sergio Isada	Fighting Maroons	Oliver Almadro
University of Santo Tomas (UST)	Golden Spikers	Arthur Alan Mamon	Golden Tigresses	Kungfu Reyes

High School division
High school	Boys' team	Girls' team
Adamson University (AdU)	Baby Falcons	Lady Baby Falcons
Ateneo de Manila University (AdMU)	Blue Eagles	Blue Eagles
De La Salle Santiago Zobel School (DLSZ)	Junior Archers	Junior Lady Archers
Far Eastern University Diliman (FEU-D)	Baby Tamaraws	Lady Baby Tamaraws
Nazareth School of National University (NUNS)	Bullpups	Lady Bullpups
University of the East (UE)	Junior Warriors	—N/a
University of the Philippines Integrated School (UPIS)	Junior Fighting Maroons	Junior Fighting Maroons
University of Santo Tomas Senior High School (UST)	Tiger Cubs	Junior Tigresses

== Men's tournament ==
=== Team line-up ===
Adamson Soaring Falcons
No.	Name	Position
1	Aguilar, Jude Christian	MB
2	Canlas, Lorences	L
3	Gutierrez, Dan Russel	OH
4	Yboa, John Anthony	OP
5	Menor, Joel	OH
6	Bermudez, Francis Jhome	S
7	Gay, John Eugenio (c)	OP
8	Coguimbal, Mark Leo	MB
9	Ramirez, Jon Rodney	L
10	Casas, Francis	OH
11	Domingo, Ronn Lourenz	S
12	Paulino, Mark Kenneth	OH
14	Ballon, Jason Paolo	MB
23	Tahiluddin, Ahmed Vezie	OH
	Pascua, George	HC

Ateneo Blue Eagles
No.	Name	Position
1	Okeke, Childlebere Emmanuel	OH
2	Crisostomo, Leinuel	L
3	Gutierrez, Lorenzo Samuel	S
4	Gopio, Jettlee	MB
5	Batas, Kennedy	OP
7	Licauco, James Daniel	S
8	Pacinio, Amil Jr. (c)	OP
10	Daculan, Ryan	MB
12	Mangulabnan, Jan Frederick King	S
13	De Castro, Lance Andrei	L
14	De Guzman, Cyrus Justin	MB
16	Almadro, Andrei John	MB
17	Sendon, Jeric	OH
18	Salarzon, Jian Matthew	OH
	Sto. Tomas, Timothy	HC

De La Salle Green Spikers
No.	Name	Position
1	Ronquillo, John Mark (c)	OP
2	Guerrero, Menard	L
3	Anima, Billie Jean-Henri	MB
4	Mendoza, Uriel	OH
5	Adajar, Jerico	S
7	Layug, Eric Paolo	MB
8	Poquita, Diogenes III	S
9	Kampton, Noel Michael	OH
10	De Castro, Jonathan	L
11	Gloria, Eugene	OH
13	Del Pilar, Nathaniel	MB
17	Maglinao, Vince Gerard	OH
18	De Jesus, Jules Carlo	OH
20	Ventura, Glen Rui	OP
	Roque, Jose	HC

FEU Tamaraws
No.	Name	Position
2	Codilla, Jomel	OH
3	Cacao, Ariel	S
4	De Guzman, Raymond	L
5	Talisayan, Jelord	OH
7	Javelona, Jose Magdalino	OH
8	Sabanal, Reymond	M
9	Saavedra, Zhydryx	OH
10	Celajes, Jacob	L
11	Mendoza, Lirick	M
14	Bugaoan, Martin	M
15	Delicana, Andrei	OH
16	Abuniawan, Jefferson (c)	M
17	Martinez, Benny	S
18	Nadera, Vincent Jade	OH
	Orcullo, Eddieson	HC

NU Bulldogs
No.	Name	Position
1	Almendras, Angelo Nicolas	OH
2	Ancheta, Greg Augustus Luis	S
5	Abanilla, Jan Lanfred	OP
6	Buddin, Michaelo	OH
8	Sumagui, Jann Mariono	L
10	Mukaba, Obed	MB
11	Disquitado, Jade Alex	OH
12	Taguibolos, Rwenzmel	MB
13	Retamar, Ave Joshua (c)	S
16	Belostrino, Clarenz	S
17	Gapultos, Jimwell	L
18	Aringo, Leo Jr.	OP
23	Diao, Jenngerard Arnfranz	MB
24	Bandola, Mac Alvin	OP
	Alinsunurin, Dante	HC

UE Red Warriors
No.	Name	Position
1	Aligayon, John Steve	OP
2	Herbosa, King Eduard	L
3	Pozas, Joshua	OH
4	Camaymayan, Xjhann	MB
5	Quezon, Kurt William	L
7	Mangahis, John Paul (c)	OH
8	Yturralde, Reiner Dylan	S
9	Balean, Reyden	MB
11	Maralit, Brent Ydward	OH
12	Bicar, Joseph Andre	S
13	Defeo, Axel	MB
18	Reyes, Angelo	MB
19	Maglay, Jhon Stewart	OH
20	Roca, Isaiah Jhon	OP
	Guhit, Jerome	HC

UP Fighting Maroons
No.	Name	Position
1	Samaniego, Gian Carlo	OH
2	Gamban, Louis Gaspar	OH
3	Bersano, Nino Nikko	OH
5	Nicolas, Daniel (c)	OH/MB
7	Velasquez, Redhen Jade	OH
8	Laureta, Shem Lois	S
9	Lagando, Angelo	OP
11	Eusebio, Erl Klint	L
14	Juntilla, Johnlee	L
15	Malabanan, Jaivee	MB
16	Chavez, Brian	OP
17	Rubin, Jessie Roland	OH
19	Lipata, Angelo	MB
22	Santiago, Clarence	S
	Isada, Sergio	HC

UST Golden Spikers
No.	Name	Position
1	De Vega, Rey Miguel	OH
2	Salvador, Kenneth John	OH
6	Dedoroy, John Emmanuel	OH
7	Yambao, Dux Euan (c)	S
9	Avila, Joshua	S
10	Flor, Rainier	MB
11	Prudenciado, Nathaniel	L
13	Ybañez, Josh	OH
14	Valera, Trevor	MB
15	Umandal, Sherwin John	OP
16	Colinares, Edlyn Paul	MB
17	Colinares, Ennius Gwen	S
18	Prudenciado, Van Tracy	L
24	Dela Noche, Jay Rack	OP
	Mamon, Arthur Odjie	HC

Legend
S	Setter
MB	Middle Blocker
OH	Outside Hitter
OP	Opposite Hitter
L	Libero
(c)	Team Captain
HC	Head coach

=== Elimination round ===
==== Team standings ====
Pos	Team	Pld	W	L	Pts	SW	SL	SR	SPW	SPL	SPR	Qualification
1	FEU Tamaraws	14	12	2	34	38	15	2.533	1228	1113	1.103	Twice-to-beat in the semifinals
2	NU Bulldogs	14	11 (Note: Second-seed playoff: NU 3–2 La Salle)	3	33	36	13	2.769	1181	1024	1.153	Twice-to-beat in the semifinals
3	De La Salle Green Spikers	14	11	3	33	37	15	2.467	1244	1104	1.127	Twice-to-win in the semifinals
4	UST Golden Spikers	14	8	6	25	33	23	1.435	1291	1218	1.060	Twice-to-win in the semifinals
5	Ateneo Blue Eagles	14	7	7	20	26	29	0.897	1210	1202	1.007	
6	Adamson Soaring Falcons	14	4	10	13	17	30	0.567	1040	1119	0.929	
7	UP Fighting Maroons	14	2	12	7	10	39	0.256	979	1166	0.840	
8	UE Red Warriors (H)	14	1	13	3	8	41	0.195	962	1189	0.809	

Source: UAAP Volleyball on Livestats
Rules for classification: 1) win–loss record; 2) if tied for No. 2 or 4, one-game playoff; 3) match points; 4) sets ratio; 5) points ratio; 6) head-to-head record
(H) Host

==== Match-up results ====
	Round 1							Round 2						
Team ╲ Game	1	2	3	4	5	6	7	8	9	10	11	12	13	14
Adamson	La Salle school colors	UP school colors	NU school colors	UE school colors	FEU school colors	Ateneo school colors	UST school colors	UE school colors	UST school colors	FEU school colors	UP school colors	La Salle school colors	NU school colors	Ateneo school colors
Ateneo	UE school colors	NU school colors	UP school colors	La Salle school colors	UST school colors	Adamson school colors	FEU school colors	UST school colors	UP school colors	FEU school colors	NU school colors	UE school colors	La Salle school colors	Adamson school colors
La Salle	Adamson school colors	FEU school colors	UST school colors	Ateneo school colors	UE school colors	UP school colors	NU school colors	FEU school colors	UP school colors	UE school colors	NU school colors	Adamson school colors	Ateneo school colors	UST school colors
FEU	UP school colors	La Salle school colors	UE school colors	UST school colors	NU school colors	Adamson school colors	Ateneo school colors	La Salle school colors	Ateneo school colors	Adamson school colors	UST school colors	UE school colors	UP school colors	NU school colors
NU	UST school colors	Ateneo school colors	Adamson school colors	UP school colors	FEU school colors	UE school colors	La Salle school colors	UP school colors	UST school colors	UE school colors	Ateneo school colors	La Salle school colors	Adamson school colors	FEU school colors
UE	Ateneo school colors	UST school colors	FEU school colors	Adamson school colors	La Salle school colors	NU school colors	UP school colors	Adamson school colors	NU school colors	La Salle school colors	Ateneo school colors	FEU school colors	UST school colors	UP school colors
UP	FEU school colors	Adamson school colors	Ateneo school colors	NU school colors	La Salle school colors	UST school colors	UE school colors	NU school colors	Ateneo school colors	La Salle school colors	UST school colors	Adamson school colors	FEU school colors	UE school colors
UST	NU school colors	UE school colors	La Salle school colors	FEU school colors	Ateneo school colors	UP school colors	Adamson school colors	Ateneo school colors	NU school colors	Adamson school colors	UP school colors	FEU school colors	UE school colors	La Salle school colors

Source: UAAP Volleyball on Livestats
= Win; = Loss

==== Game results ====
Results on top and to the right of the solid cells are for first-round games; those to the bottom and left are for second-round games.

Teams	AdU	AdMU	DLSU	FEU	NU	UE	UP	UST
Adamson Soaring Falcons		3–0	0–3	0–3	1–3	3–0	3–0	2–3
Ateneo Blue Eagles	3–0		2–3	0–3	0–3	3–1	3–0	3–2
De La Salle Green Spikers	3–0	3–1		1–3	1–3	3–0	3–0	3–1
FEU Tamaraws	3–0	3–2	3–2		2–3	3–0	3–0	3–2
NU Bulldogs	3–0	3–0	1–3	3–0		3–0	3–0	0–3
UE Red Warriors	0–3	1–3	0–3	1–3	0–3		3–2	0–3
UP Fighting Maroons	3–1	2–3	0–3	0–3	0–3	3–2		0–3
UST Golden Spikers	3–1	2–3	1–3	1–3	3–2	3–0	3–0	

Source: UAAP Volleyball on Livestats
Legend: Blue = left column team win; Red = top row team win.

=== Second-seed playoff ===
NU and La Salle, which are tied at second place, played for the #2 seed and the twice–to–beat advantage.

May 4, 2024; 2:00 PM (UTC+8:00)	NU Bulldogs	3–2	De La Salle Green Spikers	Araneta Coliseum, Quezon City; Attendance: 4,635; Referees: Antonio Espartero & Ernesto Cabusa
May 4, 2024; 2:00 PM (UTC+8:00)	(19–25, 25–21, 25–13, 21–25, 16–14); P2 Report			Araneta Coliseum, Quezon City; Attendance: 4,635; Referees: Antonio Espartero & Ernesto Cabusa
May 4, 2024; 2:00 PM (UTC+8:00)	NU wins the twice–to–beat advantage			Araneta Coliseum, Quezon City; Attendance: 4,635; Referees: Antonio Espartero & Ernesto Cabusa

=== Bracket ===
Semifinals (Nos. 1 & 2 have twice-to-beat advantage)
1	FEU	0	1
4	UST	3	3
2	NU	3
3	La Salle	1

Finals (Best-of-three series)
4	UST	0	1
2	NU	3	3

=== Semifinals ===
The top two seeds in the semifinals have the twice-to-beat advantage.

==== FEU vs UST ====
FEU has the twice-to-beat advantage.

May 5, 2024; 2:00 PM (UTC+8:00)	FEU Tamaraws	0–3	UST Golden Spikers	SM Mall of Asia Arena, Pasay City; Attendance: 850; Referees: Ely De Jesus & Lester Lejano
May 5, 2024; 2:00 PM (UTC+8:00)	(23–25, 19–25, 26–28); P2 Report			SM Mall of Asia Arena, Pasay City; Attendance: 850; Referees: Ely De Jesus & Lester Lejano

May 8, 2024; 2:00 PM (UTC+8:00)	FEU Tamaraws	1–3	UST Golden Spikers	Araneta Coliseum, Quezon City; Attendance: 9,385; Referees: John Philip Nuñez & Anna Camille Abanto
May 8, 2024; 2:00 PM (UTC+8:00)	(18–25, 25–21, 24–26, 24–26); P2 Report			Araneta Coliseum, Quezon City; Attendance: 9,385; Referees: John Philip Nuñez & Anna Camille Abanto
May 8, 2024; 2:00 PM (UTC+8:00)	UST wins series in two games			Araneta Coliseum, Quezon City; Attendance: 9,385; Referees: John Philip Nuñez & Anna Camille Abanto

==== NU vs La Salle ====
NU has the twice-to-beat advantage.

May 8, 2024; 12:00 PM (UTC+8:00)	NU Bulldogs	3–1	De La Salle Green Spikers	Araneta Coliseum, Quezon City; Attendance: 2,498; Referees: Ely De Jesus & Christ Inaki Ramos
May 8, 2024; 12:00 PM (UTC+8:00)	(25–23, 22–25, 25–22, 25–21); P2 Report			Araneta Coliseum, Quezon City; Attendance: 2,498; Referees: Ely De Jesus & Christ Inaki Ramos
May 8, 2024; 12:00 PM (UTC+8:00)	NU wins series in one game			Araneta Coliseum, Quezon City; Attendance: 2,498; Referees: Ely De Jesus & Christ Inaki Ramos

=== Finals ===
The finals is a best-of-three series.

May 11, 2024; 2:00 PM (UTC+8:00)	NU Bulldogs	3–0	UST Golden Spikers	Araneta Coliseum, Quezon City; Attendance: 15,659; Referees: Antonio Espartero & Jason Magat
May 11, 2024; 2:00 PM (UTC+8:00)	(25–17, 26–24, 25–19); P2 Report			Araneta Coliseum, Quezon City; Attendance: 15,659; Referees: Antonio Espartero & Jason Magat

May 15, 2024; 2:00 PM (UTC+8:00)	NU Bulldogs	3–1	UST Golden Spikers	SM Mall of Asia Arena, Pasay City; Attendance: 18,736; Referees: Choi Buquid & Nestor Matematico
May 15, 2024; 2:00 PM (UTC+8:00)	(25–21, 22–25, 25–17, 25–15); P2 Report			SM Mall of Asia Arena, Pasay City; Attendance: 18,736; Referees: Choi Buquid & Nestor Matematico
May 15, 2024; 2:00 PM (UTC+8:00)	NU wins series, 2–0			SM Mall of Asia Arena, Pasay City; Attendance: 18,736; Referees: Choi Buquid & Nestor Matematico

- Finals Most Valuable Player: Ave Joshua Retamar (NU Bulldogs)

=== Awards ===
UAAP Season 86 men's volleyball champions
NU Bulldogs
Sixth title, fourth consecutive title

The awards were handed out prior to Game 2 of the Finals at the SM Mall of Asia Arena.

- Most Valuable Player: Joshua Ybañez (UST Golden Spikers)
- Rookie of the Year: Jade Alex Disquitado (NU Bulldogs)
- 1st Best Outside Spiker: Joshua Ybañez (UST Golden Spikers)
- 2nd Best Outside Spiker: Angelo Nicolas Almendras (NU Bulldogs)
- 1st Best Middle Blocker: Martin Bugaoan (FEU Tamaraws)
- 2nd Best Middle Blocker: Nathaniel Del Pilar (De La Salle Green Spikers)
- Best Opposite Spiker: Zhydryx Saavedra (FEU Tamaraws)
- Best Setter: Ave Joshua Retamar (NU Bulldogs)
- Best Libero: Menard Guerrero (De La Salle Green Spikers)

==== Players of the Week ====
The Collegiate Press Corps awards a "player of the week" for performances on the preceding week.

Week	Player	Team	Ref.
Week 1	Ariel Cacao	FEU Tamaraws	
Week 2	Ave Joshua Retamar	NU Bulldogs	
Week 3	Jade Alex Disquitado	NU Bulldogs	
Week 4	Joshua Ybañez	UST Golden Spikers	
Week 5	Joshua Ybañez	UST Golden Spikers	
Week 6	Joshua Ybañez	UST Golden Spikers	
Week 7	Noel Michael Kampton	De La Salle Green Spikers	
Week 8	Vince Gerard Maglinao	De La Salle Green Spikers	
Week 9	Michaelo Buddin	NU Bulldogs	

== Women's tournament ==
=== Team line-up ===
Adamson Lady Falcons
No.	Name	Position
1	Yandoc, Nikka Sophia Ruth	S
2	Jamili, Jimy Jean	OH
3	Villegas, Jen Kylene	MB
4	Alcantara, Angelica	S
5	Ancheta, Sharya Nicole	MB
6	Nuique, May Ann	MB
8	Adolfo, Antonette	OP
9	Lalongisip, Maria Rochelle	OH
10	Verdeflor, Maria Joahna Karen	L
12	Manuel, Juris Anne Clare	L
14	Aljibe, Princess Eloisa	MB
15	Juegos, Ayesha Tara	OP
16	Bascon, Red	OH
17	Almonte, Lucille May (c)	OH
	Yude, John Philip	HC

Ateneo Blue Eagles
No.	Name	Position
6	Pacia, Zey Mitzi	OP
7	Buena, Sophia Beatriz	OH
8	Sulit, Yvana Avik	MB
9	Fujimoto, Takako	S
10	Delos Santos, Jennifer Louise	OH
11	Tsunashima, Geezel May	OP
14	Miner, Alexis Ciarra	MB
16	De Guzman, Lyann Marie Louise	OH
17	Selga, Rosal Athena	MB
18	Lomocso, Beautiliza	S
19	Doromal, Roma Mae (c)	L
21	Cortez, Katherine Shaine	S
22	Hugo, Sarah Yzobelle	L
24	Nisperos, Faye Sophia Ysabelle	OH
	Veloso, Sergio	HC

De La Salle Lady Spikers
No.	Name	Position
1	Hernandez, Krystal Lyka	L
3	Gagate, Thea Allison	MB
5	De Leon, Lyka May	L
6	Malaluan, Alleiah Jan	OH
7	Laput, Shevana Maria Nicola	OP
9	Coronel, Julia Cyrille (c)	S
10	Larroza, Princess Maicah	OH
11	Torres, Gillianna Jenya Louise	DS/SS
12	Canino, Angel Anne	OH
13	Tolentino, Julyana	S
15	Provido, Amie	MB
16	Soreño, Baby Jyne	OP
17	Levina, Julieanne Rose	OH
22	Del Castillo, Katrina	MB
	De Jesus, Ramil	HC

FEU Lady Tamaraws
No.	Name	Position
1	Bakanke, Faida	OP
4	Truz, Karyme Isabelle	MB
5	Ubaldo, Christine	S
7	Asis, Ann Roselle	MB
8	Panangin, Mitzi	MB
9	Tagaod, Chenie	OH
10	Papa, Florize Anne	OH
13	Devosora, Alyzza Gaile	OH
15	Petallo, Gerzel Mary	OH
16	Alberto, Marilla Issabel	S
17	Encarnacion, Margarett Louise	L
18	Medina, Nikka Ann (c)	OH
19	Asis, Jean	MB
20	Monares, Julianne	L
	Refugia, Manolo Jr.	HC

NU Lady Bulldogs
No.	Name	Position
1	Bombita, Nathasza Kaye	OP
2	Denura, Pearl Ann	L
3	Pono, Abegail	S
4	Belen, Mhicaela	OH
5	Jardio, Shaira May	L
6	Alinsug, Evangeline	OH
8	Toring, Sheena Angela	MB
9	Bello, Aisha	MB
12	Solomon, Alyssa Jae	OP
13	Lamina, Camilla Victoria	S
14	Pangilinan, Erin May (c)	MB
17	Maaya, Minierva	MB
18	Panique, Ara Ella	OH
21	Escanlar, Myrtle	OH
	Miguel, Norman	HC

UE Lady Red Warriors
No.	Name	Position
1	Cepada, Kc	OH
2	Balingit, Kayce	OH
4	Villamor, Dea Pauline	L
5	Nieva, Ercae Darabella	OP
6	Castillo, Angelica Claire	OH
8	Rojo, Yesha Keith	MB
9	Dongallo, Casiey Monique	OH
10	Fernandez, Gracen Shamel	OP/S
11	Zeta, Jenina Marie	L
12	Madriaga, Kizzie (c)	S
14	Canete, Ashley	OP/MB
19	Nogales, Riza	MB
20	Reyes, Angelica	L
	Yee, Jerry	HC

UP Fighting Maroons
No.	Name	Position
2	Capistrano, Giesha Niccaleigh	L
3	Ytang, Niña	MB
4	Magsombol, Mikaela Alexa	S
7	Celis, Maria Danica	MB
8	Monares, Joan Marie	OH
10	Jaboneta, Irah Anika	OH/SS
11	Cabasac, Kyrzten Annika	OP
12	Encarnacion, Jewel Hannah Ysabel	OH
13	Baclay, Jan Halley	MB
16	Bustrillo, Stephanie	OP
17	Gayo, Jum Marie Grace	L/S
18	Goc, Abilaine (c)	OH
19	De Guia, Frances Harriette	S
20	Gould, Jenn	OH
	Almadro, Oliver Allan	HC

UST Golden Tigresses
No.	Name	Position
1	Peñafiel, Renee Lou	OH
4	Pepito, Maria Bernadett (c)	L
7	Caasi, Karylle Ann	S
10	Gula, Xyza Rufel	OH
11	Abbu, Athena Sophia	MB
13	Perdido, Jonna Chris	OH
14	Abellana, Pierre Angeli	OP
16	Carballo, Maria Cassandra Rae	S
17	Poyos, Angeline	OH
18	Jurado, Regina Grace	OP
19	Coronado, Mary Joe	MB
20	Banagua, Mary Margaret	MB
22	Plaza, Bianca Mikaela Julia	MB
23	Hilongo, Maribeth	L
	Reyes, Kungfu	HC

Legend
S	Setter
MB	Middle Blocker
OH	Outside Hitter
OP	Opposite Hitter
L	Libero
(c)	Team Captain
HC	Head coach

=== Elimination round ===
==== Team standings ====
Pos	Team	Pld	W	L	Pts	SW	SL	SR	SPW	SPL	SPR	Qualification
1	NU Lady Bulldogs	14	12	2	36	38	12	3.167	1192	965	1.235	Twice-to-beat in the semifinals
2	UST Golden Tigresses	14	12	2	34	39	17	2.294	1293	1148	1.126	Twice-to-beat in the semifinals
3	De La Salle Lady Spikers	14	11	3	32	37	15	2.467	1193	1023	1.166	Twice-to-win in the semifinals
4	FEU Lady Tamaraws	14	9	5	26	30	23	1.304	1190	1131	1.052	Twice-to-win in the semifinals
5	Ateneo Blue Eagles	14	5	9	16	22	31	0.710	1109	1182	0.938	
6	UE Lady Red Warriors (H)	14	3	11	11	18	36	0.500	1091	1268	0.860	
7	Adamson Lady Falcons	14	3	11	8	14	36	0.389	1037	1202	0.863	
8	UP Fighting Maroons	14	1	13	5	12	40	0.300	1078	1264	0.853	

Source: UAAP Volleyball on Livestats
Rules for classification: 1) win–loss record; 2) if tied for No. 2 or 4, one-game playoff; 3) match points; 4) sets ratio; 5) points ratio; 6) head-to-head record
(H) Host

==== Match-up results ====
	Round 1							Round 2						
Team ╲ Game	1	2	3	4	5	6	7	8	9	10	11	12	13	14
Adamson	La Salle school colors	UP school colors	NU school colors	UE school colors	FEU school colors	Ateneo school colors	UST school colors	UE school colors	UST school colors	FEU school colors	UP school colors	La Salle school colors	NU school colors	Ateneo school colors
Ateneo	UE school colors	NU school colors	UP school colors	La Salle school colors	UST school colors	Adamson school colors	FEU school colors	UST school colors	UP school colors	FEU school colors	NU school colors	UE school colors	La Salle school colors	Adamson school colors
La Salle	Adamson school colors	FEU school colors	UST school colors	Ateneo school colors	UE school colors	UP school colors	NU school colors	FEU school colors	UP school colors	UE school colors	NU school colors	Adamson school colors	Ateneo school colors	UST school colors
FEU	UP school colors	La Salle school colors	UE school colors	UST school colors	NU school colors	Adamson school colors	Ateneo school colors	La Salle school colors	Ateneo school colors	Adamson school colors	UST school colors	UE school colors	UP school colors	NU school colors
NU	UST school colors	Ateneo school colors	Adamson school colors	UP school colors	FEU school colors	UE school colors	La Salle school colors	UP school colors	UST school colors	UE school colors	Ateneo school colors	La Salle school colors	Adamson school colors	FEU school colors
UE	Ateneo school colors	UST school colors	FEU school colors	Adamson school colors	La Salle school colors	NU school colors	UP school colors	Adamson school colors	NU school colors	La Salle school colors	Ateneo school colors	FEU school colors	UST school colors	UP school colors
UP	FEU school colors	Adamson school colors	Ateneo school colors	NU school colors	La Salle school colors	UST school colors	UE school colors	NU school colors	Ateneo school colors	La Salle school colors	UST school colors	Adamson school colors	FEU school colors	UE school colors
UST	NU school colors	UE school colors	La Salle school colors	FEU school colors	Ateneo school colors	UP school colors	Adamson school colors	Ateneo school colors	NU school colors	Adamson school colors	UP school colors	FEU school colors	UE school colors	La Salle school colors

Source: UAAP Volleyball on Livestats
= Win; = Loss

==== Game results ====
Results on top and to the right of the solid cells are for first-round games; those to the bottom and left are for second-round games.

Teams	AdU	AdMU	DLSU	FEU	NU	UE	UP	UST
Adamson Lady Falcons		1–3	0–3	0–3	0–3	3–1	3–0	1–3
Ateneo Blue Eagles	3–0		0–3	1–3	2–3	1–3	3–2	0–3
De La Salle Lady Spikers	3–1	3–0		3–0	3–2	3–0	3–0	2–3
FEU Lady Tamaraws	3–0	3–1	0–3		1–3	3–2	3–0	2–3
NU Lady Bulldogs	3–0	3–0	3–1	3–0		3–0	3–0	0–3
UE Lady Red Warriors	3–1	1–3	2–3	1–3	0–3		1–3	1–3
UP Fighting Maroons	2–3	0–3	1–3	1–3	1–3	1–3		0–3
UST Golden Tigresses	3–1	3–2	3–1	2–3	1–3	3–0	3–1	

Source: UAAP Volleyball on Livestats
Legend: Blue = left column team win; Red = top row team win.

=== Bracket ===
Semifinals (Nos. 1 & 2 have twice-to-beat advantage)
1	NU	0	3
4	FEU	3	0
2	UST	3
3	La Salle	2

Finals (Best-of-three series)
1	NU	3	3
2	UST	0	1

=== Semifinals ===
The top two seeds in the semifinals have the twice-to-beat advantage.

==== NU vs FEU ====
NU has the twice-to-beat advantage.

May 4, 2024; 4:00 PM (UTC+8:00)	NU Lady Bulldogs	0–3	FEU Lady Tamaraws	Araneta Coliseum, Quezon City; Attendance: 5,101; Referees: Choi Buquid & Nestor Matimatico
May 4, 2024; 4:00 PM (UTC+8:00)	(23–25, 17-25, 23–25); P2 Report			Araneta Coliseum, Quezon City; Attendance: 5,101; Referees: Choi Buquid & Nestor Matimatico

May 8, 2024; 4:00 PM (UTC+8:00)	NU Lady Bulldogs	3–0	FEU Lady Tamaraws	Araneta Coliseum, Quezon City; Attendance: 7,144; Referees: Antonio Espartero & Lester Lejano
May 8, 2024; 4:00 PM (UTC+8:00)	(25–13, 27–25, 25–15); P2 Report			Araneta Coliseum, Quezon City; Attendance: 7,144; Referees: Antonio Espartero & Lester Lejano
May 8, 2024; 4:00 PM (UTC+8:00)	NU wins series in two games			Araneta Coliseum, Quezon City; Attendance: 7,144; Referees: Antonio Espartero & Lester Lejano

==== UST vs La Salle ====
UST has the twice-to-beat advantage.

May 5, 2024; 6:00 PM (UTC+8:00)	UST Golden Tigresses	3–2	De La Salle Lady Spikers	SM Mall of Asia Arena, Pasay City; Attendance: 19,505; Referees: Choi Buquid & Romulo Reforsado
May 5, 2024; 6:00 PM (UTC+8:00)	(25–20, 16–25, 25–20, 19–25, 15–7); P2 Report			SM Mall of Asia Arena, Pasay City; Attendance: 19,505; Referees: Choi Buquid & Romulo Reforsado
May 5, 2024; 6:00 PM (UTC+8:00)	UST wins series in one game			SM Mall of Asia Arena, Pasay City; Attendance: 19,505; Referees: Choi Buquid & Romulo Reforsado

=== Finals ===
The finals is a best-of-three series.

May 11, 2024; 4:00 PM (UTC+8:00)	NU Lady Bulldogs	3–0	UST Golden Tigresses	Araneta Coliseum, Quezon City; Attendance: 20,955; Referees: Eulogio Buquid & Nestor Matematico
May 11, 2024; 4:00 PM (UTC+8:00)	(25–23, 25–20, 25–20); P2 Report			Araneta Coliseum, Quezon City; Attendance: 20,955; Referees: Eulogio Buquid & Nestor Matematico

May 15, 2024; 4:00 PM (UTC+8:00)	NU Lady Bulldogs	3–1	UST Golden Tigresses	SM Mall of Asia Arena, Pasay City; Attendance: 22,515; Referees: Romulo Reforsado & Camille Abanto
May 15, 2024; 4:00 PM (UTC+8:00)	(25–23, 23–25, 27–25, 25–16); P2 Report			SM Mall of Asia Arena, Pasay City; Attendance: 22,515; Referees: Romulo Reforsado & Camille Abanto
May 15, 2024; 4:00 PM (UTC+8:00)	NU wins series, 2–0			SM Mall of Asia Arena, Pasay City; Attendance: 22,515; Referees: Romulo Reforsado & Camille Abanto

- Finals Most Valuable Player: Alyssa Jae Solomon (NU Bulldogs)

=== Awards ===
UAAP Season 86 women's volleyball champions
NU Lady Bulldogs
Fourth title

The awards were handed out prior to Game 2 of the Finals at the SM Mall of Asia Arena.

- Most Valuable Player: Mhicaela Belen (NU Lady Bulldogs)
- Rookie of the Year: Angeline Poyos (UST Golden Tigresses)
- 1st Best Outside Spiker: Mhicaela Belen (NU Lady Bulldogs)
- 2nd Best Outside Spiker: Angeline Poyos (UST Golden Tigresses)
- 1st Best Middle Blocker: Thea Allison Gagate (De La Salle Lady Spikers)
- 2nd Best Middle Blocker: Niña Ytang (UP Fighting Maroons)
- Best Opposite Spiker: Alyssa Jae Solomon (NU Lady Bulldogs)
- Best Setter: Ma. Cassandra Rae Carballo (UST Golden Tigresses)
- Best Libero: Ma. Bernadett Pepito (UST Golden Tigresses)

==== Players of the Week ====
The Collegiate Press Corps awards a "player of the week" for performances on the preceding week.

Week	Player	Team	Ref.
Week 1	Angeline Poyos	UST Golden Tigresses	
Week 2	Ma. Cassandra Rae Carballo	UST Golden Tigresses	
Week 3	Mhicaela Belen	NU Lady Bulldogs	
Week 4	Angeline Poyos	UST Golden Tigresses	
Week 5	Mhicaela Belen	NU Lady Bulldogs	
Week 6	Angeline Poyos	UST Golden Tigresses	
Week 7	Faida Bakanke	FEU Lady Tamaraws	
Week 8	Shevana Maria Nicola Laput	De La Salle Lady Spikers	
Week 9	Jonna Chris Perdido	UST Golden Tigresses	

== Boys' tournament ==
=== Team line-up ===
Adamson Baby Falcons
No.	Name	Position
1	DINGLE, Clark Louise S.	S
2	GUEVARRA, John Ian Juris B.	L
3	DUCUSIN, Jims Reaven A.	OP
4	FLORITA, Alfred John	MB
5	OBILLO, John Mark A.	L / OH
6	CASTRODES, Tommy P.	OH
7	CLEMENTE, Brandy E.	OH
8	CUISON, Carl Andrey B.	OH / L
9	DE GUZMAN, Gabriel Jayve J.	MB
10	DOMINGUITO, Cj C.	OH
11	NACARIO, Privaldo III M.	MB
12	RAMOS, Jan Laurence G.	MB
13	SAMSON, Yuan Jon A.	OP
14	TABON, Robert Dwight A.	S / (c)
	RAMOSO, Marvin R.	HC

Ateneo Blue Eagles
No.	Name	Position
1	SINJIAN, Alfonso Santino	OH
2	GABIA, Kevin	OP
3	GARCIA, Lucas	S
6	LUNAR, Dominic Matthew	L
7	MANALASTAS, Jose Tadeo	OH
8	BAHIA, Gian Sebastian (c)	S
9	BERDOS, Mon Paquito	L
10	ABAD, Juancho	MB
11	ISRAEL, Kyan Dale	MB
14	NICOLAS, Ken Harvey	OH
15	TURQUEZA, Miguel Mariano	MB
16	AVILA, Santiago Andres	MB
17	NISPEROS, Jedric	OH
18	CASTRO, Ron Eirik	OP
	Babes Castillo	HC

Zobel Junior Archers
No.	Name	Position
1	Mario Roxas	
2	Antonio Papa	
3	Jayden Espares	
4	Ashton Dumana	
5	Floyd Marinduque	
6	Christopher Pallega	
7	Emmanuel Pegar	
8	John Talens	
9	Alessandro Baligod	
10	Mewin Capeña	
11	Kyle Aure	
12	John Dimatulac	
13	Joeniel Bergantin	
14		
	Ronilo Gacula	HC

FEU–D Baby Tamaraws
No.	Name	Position
1		
2		
3		
4		
5		
6		
7		
8		
9		
10		
11		
12		
13		
14		
		HC

NUNS Bullpups
No.	Name	Position
1		
2		
3		
4		
5		
6		
7		
8		
9		
10		
11		
12		
13		
14		
		HC

UE Junior Red Warriors
No.	Name	Position
1	MACAM, Jan Julian	
2	MANALO, Chilwu	
3	MONTEMAYOR, Xyrone	
4	BABON, Lance	
5	REYES, Karl	
6	FLESTADO, Lance	
7	ANCHETA, Aaron	
8	GIANAN, Clarence	
9	POLLENTES, Luis	
10	CUADA, Anrhil	
11	MOSUELA, Charles	
12	SUMAGAYSAY, John	
13	MOSUELA, Ralph	
14	CARO, Kenzie	
	MOSUELA, Raffy	HC

UST Tiger Cubs
No.	Name	Position
2	ESTRABON, Diego	
4	JUNIO, Alwyne	
5	ROQUE, Paul	
6	LUSTON, Gherick	
8	QUEMADA, Ace	
9	LEGASPI, Kalel (c)	
10	CRUZ, Sean	
11	ESTEBAN, Chester	
12	POJA, Ron	
13	TEHONES, Junlie	
17	PERJES, Erick	
18	MEDINO, Paolo	
21	AYCO, Joncriz	
28	MALIT, Michael	
	ESTEBAN, Clarence	HC

UP Fighting Maroons
No.	Name	Position
1	Lawrence Rabi	
2	JM Navarro	
3	Japhet Casabar	
4	Marco Bamba	
5	Joven Mendoza	
6	Areef Gamon	
7	Manfred Rosete	
8	Terren Villanueva	
9	Marcus Bamba	
10	Noah Parungao	
11	Zack Escalaw	
12	Raiven Pascual	
13		
14		
		HC

Legend
S	Setter
MB	Middle Blocker
OH	Outside Hitter
OP	Opposite Hitter
L	Libero
(c)	Team Captain
HC	Head coach

=== Elimination round ===
==== Team standings ====
Pos	Team	Pld	W	L	Pts	SW	SL	SR	SPW	SPL	SPR	Qualification
1	NUNS Bullpups	14	12	2	36	38	9	4.222	347	236	1.470	Twice-to-beat in the semifinals
2	UE Junior Red Warriors	14	12	2	35	36	10	3.600	332	221	1.502	Twice-to-beat in the semifinals
3	FEU–D Baby Tamaraws	14	11	3	33	35	11	3.182	294	221	1.330	Twice-to-win in the semifinals
4	UST Tiger Cubs	14	8	6	25	30	19	1.579	335	330	1.015	Twice-to-win in the semifinals
5	Adamson Baby Falcons (H)	14	7	7	21	25	23	1.087	318	243	1.309	
6	Zobel Junior Archers	14	4	10	11	12	33	0.364	145	275	0.527	
7	UPIS Junior Fighting Maroons	14	2	12	7	9	36	0.250	187	283	0.661	
8	Ateneo Blue Eagles	14	0	14	0	0	42	0.000	148	300	0.493	

Source: UAAP Volleyball on Twitter
Rules for classification: 1) number of wins; 2) if tied for No. 2 or 4, one-game playoff; 3) match points; 4) sets ratio; 5) points ratio; 6) head-to-head record
(H) Host

==== Match-up results ====
	Round 1							Round 2						
Team ╲ Game	1	2	3	4	5	6	7	8	9	10	11	12	13	14
Adamson	La Salle school colors	FEU school colors	UP school colors	UST school colors	UE school colors	NU school colors	Ateneo school colors	NU school colors	Ateneo school colors	UE school colors	UST school colors	La Salle school colors	UP school colors	FEU school colors
Ateneo	UP school colors	NU school colors	La Salle school colors	FEU school colors	UST school colors	UE school colors	Adamson school colors	La Salle school colors	Adamson school colors	UST school colors	FEU school colors	NU school colors	UE school colors	UP school colors
DLSZ	Adamson school colors	UE school colors	Ateneo school colors	NU school colors	FEU school colors	UST school colors	UP school colors	Ateneo school colors	NU school colors	UP school colors	UE school colors	Adamson school colors	FEU school colors	UST school colors
FEU–D	UE school colors	Adamson school colors	UST school colors	Ateneo school colors	La Salle school colors	UP school colors	NU school colors	UE school colors	UP school colors	NU school colors	Ateneo school colors	UST school colors	La Salle school colors	Adamson school colors
NUNS	UST school colors	Ateneo school colors	UE school colors	La Salle school colors	UP school colors	Adamson school colors	FEU school colors	Adamson school colors	La Salle school colors	FEU school colors	UP school colors	Ateneo school colors	UST school colors	UE school colors
UE	FEU school colors	La Salle school colors	NU school colors	UP school colors	Adamson school colors	Ateneo school colors	UST school colors	FEU school colors	UST school colors	Adamson school colors	La Salle school colors	UP school colors	Ateneo school colors	NU school colors
UPIS	Ateneo school colors	UST school colors	Adamson school colors	UE school colors	NU school colors	FEU school colors	La Salle school colors	UST school colors	FEU school colors	La Salle school colors	NU school colors	UE school colors	Adamson school colors	Ateneo school colors
UST	NU school colors	UP school colors	FEU school colors	Adamson school colors	Ateneo school colors	La Salle school colors	UE school colors	UP school colors	UE school colors	Ateneo school colors	Adamson school colors	FEU school colors	NU school colors	La Salle school colors

Source: UAAP Volleyball on Twitter
= Win; = Loss

==== Game results ====
Results on top and to the right of the solid cells are for first-round games; those to the bottom and to the left of it are second-round games.

Teams	AdU	ADMU	DLSZ	FEU-D	NUNS	UE	UPIS	UST
Adamson Baby Falcons		3–0	3–0	0–3	0–3	0–3	3–0	3–2
Ateneo Blue Eagles	0–3		0–3	0–3	0–3	0–3	0–3	0–3
Zobel Junior Archers	0–3	3–0		0–3	0–3	0–3	3–1	0–3
FEU–D Baby Tamaraws	3–2	3–0	3–0		2–3	0–3	3–0	3–0
NUNS Bullpups	3–0	3–0	3–0	0–3		2–3	3–0	3–1
UE Junior Red Warriors	3–1	3–0	3–0	3–0	0–3		3–0	3–1
UPIS Junior Fighting Maroons	0–3	3–0	2–3	0–3	0–3	0–3		0–3
UST Tiger Cubs	3–1	3–0	3–0	1–3	1–3	3–0	3–0	

Source: UAAP Volleyball on Twitter
Legend: Blue = left column team win; Red = top row team win.

=== Bracket ===
Semifinals (Nos. 1 & 2 have twice-to-beat advantage)
1	NUNS	3
4	UST	1
2	UE	3
3	FEU–D	1

Final (Best-of-three series)
1	NUNS	3	2	3
2	UE	1	3	1

=== Semifinals ===
NUNS and UE have the twice-to-beat advantage. They only need to win once while their opponents twice in order to qualify in the Finals.

==== NUNS vs. UST ====
February 2, 2024; 3:00 PM	NUNS Bullpups	3–1	UST Tiger Cubs	Filoil EcoOil Centre, San Juan
February 2, 2024; 3:00 PM	(25–14, 25–18, 21–25, 25–15)			Filoil EcoOil Centre, San Juan
February 2, 2024; 3:00 PM	NUNS wins series in one game			Filoil EcoOil Centre, San Juan

==== UE vs. FEU–D ====
February 2, 2024; 11:00 AM	UE Junior Red Warriors	3–1	FEU–D Baby Tamaraws	Filoil EcoOil Centre, San Juan
February 2, 2024; 11:00 AM	(8–25, 25–21, 25–22, 25–21)			Filoil EcoOil Centre, San Juan
February 2, 2024; 11:00 AM	UE wins series in one game			Filoil EcoOil Centre, San Juan

=== Finals ===
The finals is a best-of-three series.

February 6, 2024; 1:00 PM	NUNS Bullpups	3–1	UE Junior Red Warriors	Filoil EcoOil Centre, San Juan
February 6, 2024; 1:00 PM	(39–37, 24–26, 25–22, 25–21)			Filoil EcoOil Centre, San Juan

February 8, 2024; 1:00 PM	NUNS Bullpups	2–3	UE Junior Red Warriors	Filoil EcoOil Centre, San Juan
February 8, 2024; 1:00 PM	(25–18, 25–17, 25–27, 24–26, 11–15)			Filoil EcoOil Centre, San Juan

February 12, 2024; 1:00 PM	NUNS Bullpups	3–1	UE Junior Red Warriors	Filoil EcoOil Centre, San Juan
February 12, 2024; 1:00 PM	(20-25, 25-16, 27-25, 25-21)			Filoil EcoOil Centre, San Juan
February 12, 2024; 1:00 PM	NUNS wins series, 2–1			Filoil EcoOil Centre, San Juan

- Finals Most Valuable Player: Jeff Gallego (NUNS Bullpups)

=== Awards ===
UAAP Season 86 boys' volleyball champions
NUNS Bullpups
Fifth title

The awards were handed out prior to Game 3 of the Finals at the Filoil EcoOil Centre.

- Most Valuable Player: Joncriz Ayco (UST Tiger Cubs)
- 1st Best Outside Spiker: Jon Paolo Medino (UST Tiger Cubs)
- 2nd Best Outside Spiker: Kyle Clarence Tandoc (FEU–D Baby Tamaraws)
- 1st Best Middle Blocker: Crisean Cruz (UST Tiger Cubs)
- 2nd Best Middle Blocker: Miguel Egger (NUNS Bullpups)
- Best Opposite Spiker: Joncriz Ayco (UST Tiger Cubs)
- Best Setter: Rhodson Duot (FEU–D Baby Tamaraws)
- Best Libero: John Ian Guevarra (Adamson Baby Falcons)

== Girls' tournament ==
=== Team line-up ===
Adamson Lady Baby Falcons
No.	Name	Position
1	TUDDAO, Lhouriz	MB
2	CANTADA, Sam	OH
3	NITURA, Shaina (c)	OH
4	MARTIN, Kristal	OH
5	DIZON, Janna	MB
7	ARASAN, Jennel	S
8	SEGUI, Abby	OP
11	PINEDA, Maegan	L
12	DEL MORAL, MG	MB
13	GAM, Jesselou	L
14	SAGAYSAY, Fhei	S
16	ESTRADA, Mishka	OP
17	CARPIZO, Kirsten	OH
23	ORDONIO, Seanne	MB
	YUDE, JP	HC

Ateneo Blue Eagles
No.	Name	Position
1	CAJUCOM-UY, Megan	L
2	ARDIDON, Rian	OH
3	QUIMPO, Ten (c)	OH
4	TORRES, Satya	S
5	SANCHEZ, Reg	OH
6	LIM, Annika	OH
7	MALONZO, Reece	MB
8	RAMOS, Althea	MB
9	DAGALA, Angel	S
10	KAW, Jam	OP
11	MARTIJA, Abby	L
16	NADONG, Ces	MB
17	DY, Lian	MB
18	LADIGNON, Nicola	OP
	CASTILLO, Babes	HC

Zobel Junior Lady Archers
No.	Name	Position
1	DELOS SANTOS, Elina	L
3	JOSE, Malia	OH
5	CENIZAL, Angel	L
7	MINDANAO, Juliene	OP
8	VALDEZ, Sabine	S
9	ALEMAÑA, Aislinn	OH
11	ABELAT, Priya	OP
13	MARZAN, Sam	OH
14	BELEN, Mary Chloe	S
16	TRIA, Kat	OH
17	ANDRES, Julia	MB
18	CORTEZ, Riane (c)	OP
19	GAMBOA, Cassandra	MB
21	SOTTO, Erin	MB
	MONREAL, Jeremiah	HC

FEU–D Lady Baby Tamaraws
No.	Name	Position
1	LOPEZ, Love	OH
2	ALONZO, Raine	OP
5	ARCIAGA, Pat	OH
6	PENDON, Kyle	MB
7	ALIMEN, Jing	OH
8	TUMAYAO, Princess	S
9	PASCUAL, Sheila	OH
10	LORESCO, Clarisse	MB
12	ARROYO, Fiona	L
14	SUPLICO, Karylle	L
15	PREMAYLON, Chie	OP
16	CABALLERO, Kieralyn	MB
18	MALUTO, Bea (c)	MB
25	RAMOS, CD	S
	DEL ROSARIO, RJay	HC

NUNS Lady Bullpups
No.	Name	Position
1	DAYLISAN, Den	OP
2	TORRES, Mykee	L
3	BERAYO, Bambam	OH
4	NOCEJA, Yesha	OH
6	OLANGO, Kianne (c)	OP
8	SERNECHE, Harlyn	OP
9	CEPADA, IC	L
11	SILLA, Robielle	MB
13	MIRANDA, Karyll	S
14	BANSIL, Bienne	MB
15	PEÑOL, Cheska	S
16	SALAZAR, Pat	MB
19	MARSH, Celine	OH
23	TIZON, Carlyn Nathalie	OH
	MIGUEL, Norman	HC

UP Junior Fighting Maroons
No.	Name	Position
1	LAGRADILLA, Nica	OP
2	INANDAN, Sofia	MB
9	DIMAGIBA, Cian	MB
10	GUARINO, Janella (c)	OP
11	LEGUIAB, Trizia	L
12	LEAÑO, Mira	OH
13	CANONIZADO, Rizza	OH
14	HERNANDEZ, Keira	S
15	CALLO, Anya	MB
16	LONG, Khloe	S
17	CUERVO, Natalie	MB
20	ABAD, Nina	OH
	FIEL, Andy	HC

UST Junior Tigresses
No.	Name	Position
1	RUBIN, Kim	OH
2	MAURICIO, Chaitlin	S
3	ADRAO, Jai	MB
4	RODRIGUEZ, Pia	L
5	LIPAT, Qeria	OH
8	ALTEA, Marga (c)	OP
9	CHUA, Ysa	OP
10	ARASAN, Bien	OH
11	BRON, Avril	MB
12	PENULIAR, Iya	MB
13	ESCOBER, Pau	L
16	BAJAMONDE, Rashel	MB
18	SINSON, Abi	OH
21	SALANG, Maile	S
	REYES, Kungfu	HC

Legend
S	Setter
MB	Middle Blocker
OH	Outside Hitter
OP	Opposite Hitter
L	Libero
(c)	Team Captain
HC	Head coach

=== Elimination round ===
==== Team standings ====
Pos	Team	Pld	W	L	Pts	SW	SL	SR	SPW	SPL	SPR	Qualification
1	Adamson Lady Baby Falcons (H)	12	12	0	34	36	4	9.000	300	238	1.261	Advance to the finals
2	UST Junior Tigresses	12	8 (Note: Second–seed playoff: UST 3–2 NU)	4	24	27	14	1.929	205	168	1.220	Proceed to stepladder round 2
3	NUNS Lady Bullpups	12	8	4	26	30	14	2.143	310	234	1.325	Proceed to stepladder round 1
4	FEU–D Lady Baby Tamaraws	12	8	4	24	26	16	1.625	223	208	1.072	Proceed to stepladder round 1
5	Zobel Junior Lady Archers	12	4	8	12	13	26	0.500	165	195	0.846	
6	Ateneo Blue Eagles	12	2	10	6	7	31	0.226	262	314	0.834	
7	UPIS Junior Lady Maroons	12	0	12	0	2	36	0.056	142	250	0.568	

Source: UAAP Volleyball on Twitter
Rules for classification: 1) number of wins; 2) if tied for No. 2 or 4, one-game playoff; 3) match points; 4) sets ratio; 5) points ratio; 6) head-to-head record
(H) Host

==== Match-up results ====
	Round 1						Round 2					
Team ╲ Game	1	2	3	4	5	6	7	8	9	10	11	12
Adamson	UST school colors	La Salle school colors	FEU school colors	Ateneo school colors	UP school colors	NU school colors	UST school colors	La Salle school colors	NU school colors	Ateneo school colors	UP school colors	FEU school colors
Ateneo	UP school colors	FEU school colors	La Salle school colors	Adamson school colors	NU school colors	UST school colors	FEU school colors	UP school colors	Adamson school colors	NU school colors	UST school colors	La Salle school colors
DLSZ	Adamson school colors	Ateneo school colors	NU school colors	UST school colors	FEU school colors	UP school colors	UP school colors	Adamson school colors	NU school colors	UST school colors	FEU school colors	Ateneo school colors
FEU–D	NU school colors	Ateneo school colors	Adamson school colors	UP school colors	La Salle school colors	UST school colors	NU school colors	Ateneo school colors	UST school colors	UP school colors	La Salle school colors	Adamson school colors
NUNS	FEU school colors	UP school colors	UST school colors	La Salle school colors	Ateneo school colors	Adamson school colors	FEU school colors	Adamson school colors	La Salle school colors	Ateneo school colors	UP school colors	UST school colors
UPIS	Ateneo school colors	NU school colors	UST school colors	FEU school colors	Adamson school colors	La Salle school colors	La Salle school colors	UST school colors	Ateneo school colors	FEU school colors	Adamson school colors	NU school colors
UST	Adamson school colors	NU school colors	UP school colors	La Salle school colors	Ateneo school colors	FEU school colors	Adamson school colors	UP school colors	FEU school colors	La Salle school colors	Ateneo school colors	NU school colors

Source: UAAP Volleyball on Twitter
= Win; = Loss

==== Game results ====
Results on top and to the right of the solid cells are for first-round games; those to the bottom and to the left of it are second-round games.

Teams	AdU	ADMU	DLSZ	FEU-D	NUNS	UPIS	UST
Adamson Lady Baby Falcons		3–0	3–0	3–0	3–2	3–0	3–0
Ateneo Blue Eagles	0–3		0–3	0–3	0–3	3–1	0–3
Zobel Junior Lady Archers	0–3	3–1		1–3	0–3	3–0	0–3
FEU–D Lady Baby Tamaraws	0–3	3–0	3–0		3–2	3–0	3–1
NUNS Lady Bullpups	2–3	3–0	3–0	3–0		3–0	0–3
UPIS Junior Fighting Maroons	0–3	0–3	1–3	0–3	0–3		0–3
UST Junior Tigresses	0–3	3–0	3–0	3–2	2–3	3–0	

Source: UAAP Volleyball on Twitter
Legend: Blue = left column team win; Red = top row team win.

=== Second seed playoff ===
NUNS and UST, which are tied at second place, will play for the #2 seed, and advance to stepladder round 2 of the playoffs.

January 31, 2024; 12:00 NN (UTC+8:00)	NUNS Lady Bullpups	2–3	UST Junior Tigresses	Adamson University Gym
January 31, 2024; 12:00 NN (UTC+8:00)	(23–25, 25–19, 21–25, 25–17, 11–15)			Adamson University Gym
January 31, 2024; 12:00 NN (UTC+8:00)	UST advances to the stepladder round 2			Adamson University Gym

=== Bracket ===
Stepladder round 1 (Knockout)
3	NUNS	3
4	FEU–D	0

Stepladder round 2 (Knockout)
2	UST	1
3	NUNS	3

Finals (Best-of-three series)
1	Adamson	3	3
3	NUNS	0	0

=== Stepladder semifinals ===
==== Stepladder round 1 ====
February 2, 2024; 1:00 PM (UTC +8:00)	NUNS Lady Bullpups	3–0	FEU–D Lady Baby Tamaraws	Filoil EcoOil Centre, San Juan
February 2, 2024; 1:00 PM (UTC +8:00)	(25–17, 25–19, 25–23)			Filoil EcoOil Centre, San Juan
February 2, 2024; 1:00 PM (UTC +8:00)	NUNS advances to the stepladder round 2			Filoil EcoOil Centre, San Juan

==== Stepladder round 2 ====
February 6, 2024; 3:00 PM (UTC +8:00)	UST Junior Tigresses	1–3	NUNS Lady Bullpups	Filoil EcoOil Centre, San Juan
February 6, 2024; 3:00 PM (UTC +8:00)	(20–25, 24–26, 25–18, 23–25)			Filoil EcoOil Centre, San Juan
February 6, 2024; 3:00 PM (UTC +8:00)	NUNS advances to the Finals			Filoil EcoOil Centre, San Juan

=== Finals ===
The finals is a best-of-three playoff.

February 8, 2024; 3:00 PM (UTC +8:00)	Adamson Lady Baby Falcons	3–0	NUNS Lady Bullpups	Filoil EcoOil Centre, San Juan
February 8, 2024; 3:00 PM (UTC +8:00)	(25–23, 25–20, 28–26)			Filoil EcoOil Centre, San Juan

February 12, 2024; 3:30 PM (UTC +8:00)	Adamson Lady Baby Falcons	3–0	NUNS Lady Bullpups	Filoil EcoOil Centre, San Juan
February 12, 2024; 3:30 PM (UTC +8:00)	(25–18, 25–18, 28–26)			Filoil EcoOil Centre, San Juan
February 12, 2024; 3:30 PM (UTC +8:00)	Adamson wins series, 2–0			Filoil EcoOil Centre, San Juan

- Finals Most Valuable Player: Shaina Nitura (Adamson Lady Baby Falcons)

=== Awards ===
UAAP Season 86 girls' volleyball champions
Adamson Lady Baby Falcons
First title

The awards were handed out prior to Game 2 of the Finals at the Filoil EcoOil Centre.

- Most Valuable Player: Shaina Nitura (Adamson Lady Baby Falcons)
- 1st Best Outside Spiker: Shaina Nitura (Adamson Lady Baby Falcons)
- 2nd Best Outside Spiker: Celine Marsh (NUNS Lady Bullpups)
- 1st Best Middle Blocker: Bienne Bansil (NUNS Lady Bullpups)
- 2nd Best Middle Blocker: MG del Moral (Adamson Lady Baby Falcons)
- Best Opposite Spiker: Kianne Olango (NUNS Lady Bullpups)
- Best Setter: Fhei Sagaysay (Adamson Lady Baby Falcons)
- Best Libero: IC Cepada (NUNS Lady Bullpups)

== Overall championship points ==
=== Seniors' division ===
Team	Men	Women	Total
Adamson Soaring Falcons	4	2	6
Ateneo Blue Eagles	6	6	12
De La Salle Green Archers	8	10	18
FEU Tamaraws	10	8	18
NU Bulldogs	15	15	30
UE Red Warriors	1	4	5
UP Fighting Maroons	2	1	3
UST Growling Tigers	12	12	24

=== Juniors' division ===
Team	Boys'	Girls'	Points
Adamson Baby Falcons	6	15	21
Ateneo Blue Eagles	1	4	5
Zobel Junior Archers	4	6	10
FEU–D Baby Tamaraws	10	8	18
NUNS Bullpups	15	12	27
UE Junior Red Warriors	12	—	12
UPIS Junior Fighting Maroons	2	2	4
UST Tiger Cubs	8	10	18

Pts.	Ranking
15	Champion
12	2nd
10	3rd
8	4th
6	5th
4	6th
2	7th
1	8th
—	Did not join

In case of a tie, the team with the higher position in any tournament is ranked higher. If both are still tied, they are listed by alphabetical order.

How rankings are determined:

- Ranks 5th to 8th determined by elimination round rankings.
- Semifinals losers ranked by elimination round rankings
- Loser of the finals is ranked 2nd
- Champion is ranked 1st

== See also ==
- NCAA Season 99 volleyball tournaments

Preceded by Season 85 (2023)	UAAP volleyball tournaments Season 86 (2023–24)	Succeeded by Season 87 (2024–25)
