= JP Yude =

Filipino volleyball coach

Personal information
- Full name: JP Yude
- Nationality: Filipino
- Born: Hinigaran
- Hometown: Hinigaran, Negros Occidental
- Education: Adamson University

Coaching information
- Current team: Adamson Lady Falcons

John Philip "JP" Yude is a Filipino volleyball coach who is the head coach of both the Adamson Lady and Baby Falcons. He was a former team captain of the Soaring Falcons in the University Athletic Association of the Philippines (UAAP).

== Early life ==
An opposite hitter, Yude played high school volleyball at Hinigaran National High School before Adamson University recruited him to play for five years starting UAAP Season 76 and finish hospitality management studies.

Yude was named most valuable player when the Soaring Falcons won a pre-season crown.

== Coaching career ==
Team captain Yude was already a playing coach (assistant) in his last playing year which was in Season 80.

As a head coach of the Adamson High School girls' volleyball, he steered them to a runner-up finish in Season 85. He would later be asked to also coach the women's team with the departure of head coach Jerry Yee in Season 86.

Despite Yude's dual role, the Adamson girls dethroned NU-Nazareth in Game 2 of the best-of-three championship series via sweep on February 12, 2024, behind the greatness of eventual Season 86 MVP, Finals MVP, and 1st Best Outside Spiker Shaina Nitura.

=== Coaching record ===
Team	Competition	Year	Conference / Season	Placement
Adamson Lady Falcons	V-League	2025	Collegiate Challenge	Champion
Adamson Lady Baby Falcons	2024 Shakey's Girls Volleyball Invitational League	2024	GVIL	Champion
Adamson Lady Falcons	Akari Cup	2024	Season 1	Champion
Adamson Lady Baby Falcons	UAAP High School Girls'	2023	UAAP Season 86	Champion
Adamson Lady Falcons	UAAP Women's	2023	UAAP Season 86	7th place
Adamson Lady Falcons	UAAP High School Girls'	2022	UAAP Season 85	1st runner-up
