= Nico Almendras =

Filipino volleyball player (born 1999)

Personal information
- Full name: Angelo Nicolas Almendras
- Nationality: Filipino
- Born: July 27, 1999 (age 27) Mandaluyong, Philippines
- Education: National University
- Height: 186 cm (6 ft 1 in)

Volleyball information
- Position: Outside Hitter
- Current team: Criss Cross King Crunchers
- Number: 1

Career
- Years: Team
- 2019–2023: Sta. Elena Ball Hammers
- 2024–present: Criss Cross King Crunchers

National team
- Years: Team
- 2024–present: Philippines

Angelo Nicolas "Nico" Almendras (born July 27, 1999) is a Filipino volleyball player. He played as an outside hitter for the NU Bulldogs in the UAAP. He is currently playing for the Criss Cross King Crunchers in the Spikers' Turf.

== Career ==
=== Collegiate ===
Almendras play for the Bulldogs of the National University in the University Athletic Association of the Philippines.

He played his last playing year with Bulldogs in Season 86 of the UAAP, where the team bagged the first 4-peat championship of the school.

Almendras made his Spikers' Turf debut while playing for NU at the 2022 Open Conference and 2023 Invitational Conference. NU played under the Sta. Elena banner.

=== Club ===
He joined the Criss Cross King Crunchers in June 2024.

=== National team ===
In 2024, he became part of Alas Pilipinas, the national volleyball team of the Philippines, where the team competed in the 2024 Asian Men's Volleyball Challenge Cup and placed 10th in the tournament.

== Personal life ==
Almendras is married to Justine Pesigan since 2025.

== Clubs ==
- (Philippines) Sta. Elena Ball Hammers (2018–2023)
- (Philippines) Criss Cross King Crunchers (2024–present)

== Awards ==
=== Individual ===
Year	League	Season/Conference	Award	Ref
2022	Spikers' Turf	Open	Most Valuable Player (Conference)	
2022	V-League	Collegiate	Most Valuable Player (Conference)	
2022	V-League	Collegiate	Most Valuable Player (Finals)	
2022	V-League	Collegiate	1st Best Outside Spiker	
2024	UAAP	86	2nd Best Outside Spiker	
2024	Spikers' Turf	Invitational	1st Best Outside Spiker	

=== Collegiate ===
Year	League	Season/Conference	Title	Ref
2019	UAAP	81	Champions	
2023	UAAP	85	Champions	
2024	UAAP	86	Champions	

=== Clubs ===
Year	League	Conference	Club	Title	Ref
2019	Spikers' Turf	Open	Sta Elena–NU	3rd Place	
2022	Spikers' Turf	Open	NU-Sta. Elena	Champions	
2023	Spikers' Turf	Invitational	Sta Elena–NU	Champions	
2024	Spikers' Turf	Invitational	Criss Cross King Crunchers	Runner-up	
2025	Spikers' Turf	Open	Criss Cross King Crunchers	Runner-up	
