= Dante Alinsunurin =

Filipino volleyball coach

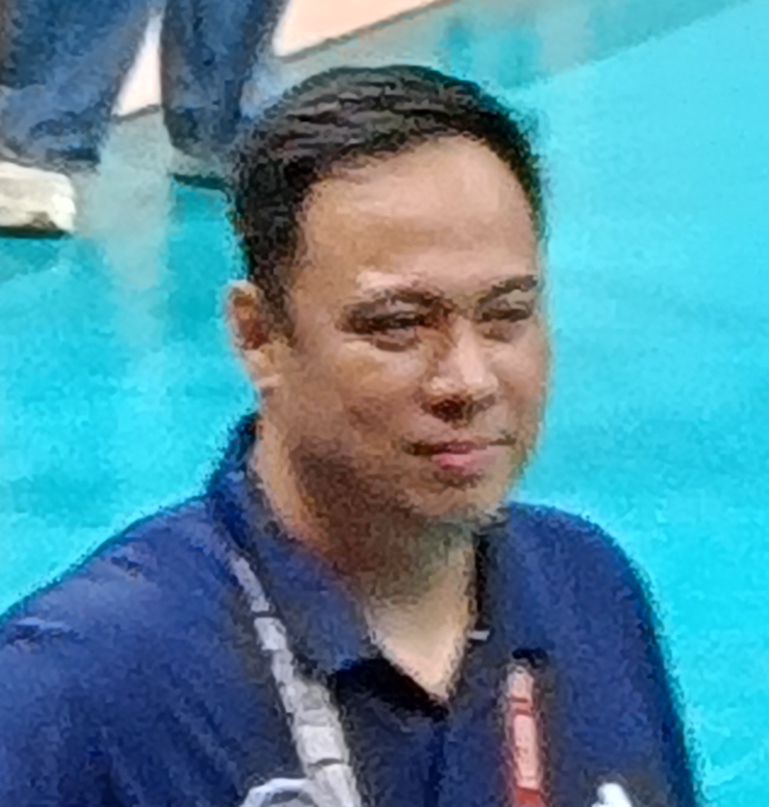

Personal information
- Nationality: Filipino

Coaching information
- Current team: Choco Mucho Flying Titans; NU Bulldogs; Philippines (men's)
Previous teams coached
Years	Teams
2009; 2010–present 2017; 2019–2022; 2021; 2023–present 2025; 2026–present	NU (women's); NU (men's); Megabuilders Volley Bolts; Philippines (men's); Go for Gold Air Force; Choco Mucho Flying Titans; Philippines WUG (men's); Philippines (men's)

National team
—	Philippines
Honours
2024 CPC Coach of the Year
Men's volleyball
Head coach for Philippines
Southeast Asian Games
Silver medal – second place	2019 Philippines	National Team

Dante Alinsunurin is a Filipino volleyball coach.

== Career ==
=== NU Bulldogs ===
The NU Bulldogs won five straight UAAP titles under Alinsunurin, their long-time head coach.

He has coached in the University Athletic Association of the Philippines, mentoring the National University (NU) Bulldogs men's volleyball team which won back-to-back titles over FEU in 2019 and Ateneo in 2018. The Bulldogs, under his watch, also took part at the 2018 ASEAN University Games in Myanmar and clinched a gold medal for the Philippines.

=== Club ===
Alinsunurin has participated at the Spikers' Turf as coach. He guided the Megabuilders Volley Bolts in 2017. He also coached Go for Gold Air Force team which finished as runners-up at the 2021 PNVF Champions League.

He joined the women's club Choco Mucho Flying Titans of the Premier Volleyball League with his first tournament set to be the 2023 All-Filipino Conference.

=== National team ===
==== First Philippines men's stint ====
Alinsunurin has coached the Philippine men's national team. A former national player himself, Alinsunurin was appointed head coach in February 2019, under the then national federation Larong Volleyball sa Pilipinas (LVP). He helped the team win a silver medal at the 2019 Southeast Asian Games. He was retained as a coach when the LVP was succeeded by the Philippine National Volleyball Federation in 2021.

He has also coached the national team at the 2021 Asian Men's Club Volleyball Championship which took part as a club side under the name Rebisco PH. In 2022, Alinsunurin led the team again for the 2021 Southeast Asian Games in Vietnam. However the team failed to maintain their success from the 2019 edition, finishing fifth.

In January 2023, Alinsunurin left the national team after he was named coach of Choco Mucho Flying Titans.

==== Philippines WUG ====
The NU Bulldogs competed as the World University Games men's volleyball team of the Philippines at the 2025 Summer World University Games in Germany. The team coached by Alinsunurin finished fourteenth out of fifteen nations at the World University Games.

==== Second Philippines men's stint ====
Alinsunurin returns as coach of the Philippines men's national team in October 2026.

== Personal life ==
The "6-peat" champion NU head coach said he dedicated this latest achievement to his older brother Mike Alinsunurin, who died on May 6, 2025.
