= Francis Saura =

Filipino volleyball player (born 1996)

Personal information
- Full name: Francis Phillip Saura
- Nationality: Filipino
- Born: May 2, 1996 (age 30)
- Height: 1.95 m (6 ft 5 in)
- Education: National University

Volleyball information
- Position: Middle Blocker; Opposite Hitter
- Current club: Criss Cross King Crunchers
- Number: 7

Francis Phillip Saura (born May 2, 1996) is a Filipino volleyball player. He played with NU Bulldogs collegiate men's University team. He is currently playing for the Criss Cross King Crunchers in the Spikers' Turf.

== Career ==
=== Collegiate ===
Saura made his first game with NU Bulldogs in UAAP Season 77, where they got an 10–4 win-loss record in the preliminary round tied with Adamson Soaring Falcons. They won against UST Golden Spikers in the Game 2 of semis. In the finals, they lost against Ateneo Blue Eagles in the Game 2 of best-of-three finals series.

In UAAP Season 78 and UAAP Season 79, they lost again against Ateneo in a best-of-three finals series.

In UAAP Season 80, they got a 12–2 win-lost in the preliminary round tied with FEU Tamaraws. They defeated the Ateneo in the playoffs and semis. NU Bulldogs gets back the championship title after 3 years of Championship drought.

In UAAP Season 81, it was the last playing year of Saura in the UAAP. They got a 13–1 win-loss in the preliminary round. They won against Adamson Soaring Falcons in the semis. They also get the championship title against FEU Tamaraws.

== Clubs ==
- (Philippines) Megabuilders Volley Bolts (2017)
- (Philippines) Sta. Elena Ball Hammers (2018)
- (Philippines) Philippine Air Force Air Spikers (2019)
- (Philippines) Imus City-AJAA Spikers (2023)
- (Philippines) D' Navigators Iloilo (2023–2024)
- (Philippines) Criss Cross King Crunchers (2024–present)

== Awards ==
=== Individual ===
Year	League	Season/Conference	Award	Ref
2017	PVL	Open	2nd Best Middle Blocker	
2019	Spikers' Turf	Open	1st Best Middle Blocker	
2024	Spikers' Turf	Open	Best Opposite Spiker	

=== Collegiate ===
Year	League	Season/Conference	Title	Ref
2015	UAAP	77	Runner-up	
2015	Spikers' Turf	Collegiate	Runner-up	
2016	UAAP	78	Runner-up	
2016	Spikers' Turf	Collegiate	Runner-up	
2017	UAAP	79	Runner-up	
2018	UAAP	80	Champions	
2018	PVL	Collegiate	Champions	
2019	UAAP	81	Champions	

=== Clubs ===
Year	League	Season/Conference	Club	Title	Ref
2017	PVL	Open	Megabuilders Volley Bolts	Runner-up	
2019	Spikers' Turf	Reinforced	Philippine Air Force Air Spikers	Runner-up	
2019	Spikers' Turf	Open	Philippine Air Force Air Spikers	Runner-up	
2023	Spikers' Turf	Open	Imus City–AJAA Spikers	3rd place	
2024	PNVF	Champions League	D' Navigators Iloilo	Runner-up	
2024	Spikers' Turf	Invitational	Criss Cross King Crunchers	Runner-up	
2025	Spikers' Turf	Open	Criss Cross King Crunchers	Runner-up	
