= 2023 Spikers' Turf season =

Sixth season of the Spikers' Turf

- League: Spikers' Turf
- Sport: Volleyball
- Duration: January 22 – December 15, 2023
- TV partner: One Sports

Conferences
- Open champions: Cignal HD Spikers
- Open runners-up: AMC Cotabato Spikers
- Invitational champions: Sta Elena–NU Nationals
- Invitational runners-up: Cignal HD Spikers

Spiker's Turf seasons
- ← 2022 2024–25 →

The 2023 Spikers' Turf season was the seventh season of Spikers' Turf. The season ran from January 22 to December 15, 2023 and began with the Open Conference. This season saw the inaugural Invitational Conference being held as the season-culminating conference.

== Open Conference ==
The 2023 Spikers' Turf Open Conference was the sixteenth conference and the start of the sixth season of the Spikers' Turf. The tournament began on January 22, 2023, with a total of eleven teams, including four new teams at the Paco Arena, Paco, Manila. This is the first conference of the league to use a Video Challenge.

=== Participating teams ===
2023 Spikers' Turf Open Conference
Abbr.	Team	Affiliation	Head coach	Team captain
AMC	AMC Cotabato Spikers	AMC Volleyball / Cotabato	Arthur Mamon	Jayvee Sumagaysay
CHD	Cignal HD Spikers	Cignal TV, Inc.	Dexter Clamor	Ysrael Wilson Marasigan
DNV	D' Navigators Iloilo	Iloilo City	Kenneth Panes	Jerome Cordez
IMU	Imus City–AJAA Spikers	Imus City / Ivy Tuason Photography	Sinfronio Acaylar	Esmilzo Polvorosa
NU	NU-Archipelago Bulldogs	National University / Archipelago Builders	Dante Alinsunurin	Joseph Bello
PJN	PGJC Navy Sea Lions	Philippine Navy	Cecille Cruzada	Gregorio Dolor
PAF	Philippine Air Force Air Spikers	Philippine Air Force	Jhimson Merza	Jessie Lopez
PAR	Philippine Army Troopers	Philippine Army	Melvin Carolino	Benjaylo Labide
SRC	Santa Rosa City Lions	Department of Education City Division of Sta. Rosa	Edward Jan Lirio	Harvey Quezada
VVH	Vanguard Volley Hitters	Vanguard Volleyball Team	Edjet Mabbayad	Ronchette Lee Villegas
VNS	VNS Griffins	VNS Management Group	Ralph Raymund Ocampo	Ron Medalla

=== Preliminary round ===
Pos	Team	Pld	W	L	Pts	SW	SL	SR	SPW	SPL	SPR	Qualification
1	Cignal HD Spikers	10	10	0	30	30	1	30.000	777	590	1.317	Final round
2	AMC Cotabato Spikers	10	9	1	27	27	7	3.857	819	704	1.163	Final round
3	D' Navigators Iloilo	10	7	3	20	24	16	1.500	888	884	1.005	Final round
4	Imus City–AJAA Spikers	10	7	3	20	23	17	1.353	919	808	1.137	Final round
5	VNS Griffins	10	6	4	16	21	19	1.105	865	891	0.971	
6	PGJC Navy Sea Lions	10	5	5	16	22	21	1.048	957	934	1.025	
7	Santa Rosa City Lions	10	4	6	11	16	22	0.727	836	887	0.943	
8	Philippine Army Troopers	10	3	7	9	17	26	0.654	889	983	0.904	
9	Philippine Air Force Air Spikers	10	2	8	6	10	26	0.385	770	850	0.906	
10	NU-Archipelago Builders	10	1	9	7	13	28	0.464	872	922	0.946	
11	Vanguard Volley Hitters	10	1	9	3	9	29	0.310	771	910	0.847	

Source: TeamPilipinas.info

=== Final round ===
==== Semifinals ====
Pos	Team	Pld	W	L	Pts	SW	SL	SR	SPW	SPL	SPR	Qualification
1	Cignal HD Spikers	3	3	0	9	9	1	9.000	248	195	1.272	Championship series
2	AMC Cotabato Spikers	3	1	2	3	4	6	0.667	228	229	0.996	Championship series
3	D' Navigators Iloilo	3	1	2	3	4	6	0.667	210	225	0.933	3rd place series
4	Imus City–AJAA Spikers	3	1	2	3	3	7	0.429	211	236	0.894	3rd place series

Source: TeamPilipinas.info

==== Finals ====
- All are best-of-three series.

==== 3rd place ====
- Imus wins the series, 1–1, via sets ratio of 1.33 vs. 0.750

Date	Time		Score		Set 1	Set 2	Set 3	Set 4	Set 5	Total	Report
29 Mar	15:00	Imus City–AJAA Spikers	1–3	D' Navigators Iloilo	25–21	23–25	21–25	22–25		91–96	P2
31 Mar	15:00	D' Navigators Iloilo	0–3	Imus City–AJAA Spikers	19–25	18–25	21–25			58–75	P2

==== Championship ====
- Cignal wins series, 2–0

Date	Time		Score		Set 1	Set 2	Set 3	Set 4	Set 5	Total	Report
29 Mar	17:30	AMC Cotabato Spikers	0–3	Cignal HD Spikers	22–25	22–25	26–28			70–78	P2
31 Mar	17:30	Cignal HD Spikers	3–2	AMC Cotabato Spikers	25–21	22–25	25–17	28–30	15–7	115–100	P2

=== Awards ===
Award	Player	Team	Ref
Conference Most Valuable Player	Joshua Umandal	AMC Cotabato Spikers	
Finals Most Valuable Player	Marck Jesus Espejo	Cignal HD Spikers	
1st Best Outside Spiker	Jade Alex Disquitado	D' Navigators Iloilo	
2nd Best Outside Spiker	Wendel Concepcion Miguel	Cignal HD Spikers	
1st Best Middle Blocker	John Paul Bugaoan	Cignal HD Spikers	
2nd Best Middle Blocker	Mfena Gwaza	D' Navigators Iloilo	
Best Opposite Spiker	Ysrael Wilson Marasigan	Cignal HD Spikers	
Best Setter	John Michael Apolinario	D' Navigators Iloilo	
Best Libero	Manuel Sumanguid III	Cignal HD Spikers	

=== Final standings ===
Rank	Team
1st place, gold medalist(s)	Cignal HD Spikers
2nd place, silver medalist(s)	AMC Cotabato Spikers
3rd place, bronze medalist(s)	Imus City–AJAA Spikers
4	D' Navigators Iloilo
5	VNS Griffins
6	PGJC Navy Sea Lions
7	Santa Rosa City Lions
8	Philippine Army Troopers
9	Philippine Air Force Air Spikers
10	NU-Archipelago Builders
11	Vanguard Volley Hitters

== Invitational Conference ==
The 2023 Spikers' Turf Invitational Conference was the seventeenth conference and the end of the sixth season of the Spikers' Turf. The tournament began from October 20 to December 15, 2023, at the Paco Arena, Paco, Manila.

This was the inaugural Invitational conference of the league, with a format similar to the Premier Volleyball League. This is the first conference where a foreign club, Maruichi Hyogo of Japan, participated in the league.

The Sta. Elena-NU Nationals beat the Cignal HD Spikers in a thrilling 5-setter knockout match in the finals, the first of its kind in the history of the league. The visiting Maruichi Hyogo then bagged the bronze medal after defeating Saints and Lattes-Letran in another five-set match. Vince Himzon of Letran clinched the MVP of the Conference, and Jade Disquitado was awarded the MVP of the Finals.

=== Participating teams ===
A total of twenty-five teams participated in this conference. Twenty-four of these teams are local, some of which had its core players from the UAAP and NCAA, and then sponsored by corporate/companies. For the first time in the league's history, they catered to a foreign guest team in Maruichi Hyogo of Japan, which had a bye to the semifinals and faced the top four local teams of the conference.

2023 Spikers' Turf Invitational Conference
Abbr.	Team	Affiliation	Head coach	Team captain
Local teams
APH	Alpha Omega Elite Spikers	Alpha Omega Elite	(Philippines) Edjet Mabbayad	(Philippines) Kim Tan
ADMU	Ateneo-Fudgee Barr Blue Eagles	Ateneo de Manila University / Republic Biscuit Corporation	(Philippines) Timmy Sto. Tomas	(Philippines) Lance Andrei De Castro
CAB	Cabstars–Cabuyao	Cabuyao City	(Philippines) Christian Antiporta	(Philippines) Aljune Centeno
CHD	Cignal HD Spikers	Cignal TV, Inc.	(Philippines) Dexter Clamor	(Philippines) Ysay Marasigan
FEU	Chef on a Diet-FEU Tamaraws	Chef on a Diet / Far Eastern University	(Philippines) Eddieson Orcullo	(Philippines) Jefferson Abuniawan
DNV	D' Navigators Iloilo	Iloilo City	(Philippines) Boyet Delmoro	(Philippines) John Michael Apolinario
ADU	Davies Paint-Adamson Soaring Falcons	Davies Paints Philippines / Adamson University	(Philippines) George Pascua	(Philippines) John Eugenio Gay
DLSD	Don Pacundo-DLSU Dasmariñas Patriots	Don Pacundo Sportswear / De La Salle University – Dasmariñas	(Philippines) Jerome Roland Mirano	(Philippines) Valeriano Sasis
EAC	EAC-Xentromall Generals	ARMC Holdings Company, Inc. / Emilio Aguinaldo College	(Philippines) Rodrigo Palmero	(Philippines) Bhim Lawrence Diones
DLSU	EcoOil-La Salle Green Oilers	Eco Oil Ltd. / De La Salle University	(Philippines) Jose Monsol Roque	(Philippines) John Mark Ronquillo
SBU	MKA-San Beda Red Spikers	MKA / San Beda University	(Philippines) Ariel Dela Cruz	(Philippines) Aidjien Josh Rus
PCU	PCU Dasmariñas-SASKIN Dolphins	Philippine Christian University Dasmariñas / SASKIN	(Philippines) Reygan Espera	(Philippines) Lan Carlo Agatep
UPHSD	Perpetual-Kinto Altas	University of Perpetual Help System DALTA / Kinto Tyres Philippines	(Philippines) Sammy Acaylar	(Philippines) John Christian Enarciso
PGJC	PGJC-Navy Sea Lions	Philippine Navy	(Philippines) Cecille Cruzada	(Philippines) Marvin Hairami
PAF	Philippine Air Force Airmen	Philippine Air Force	(Philippines) Jhimson Merza	(Philippines) Rodolfo Labrador
PAT	Philippine Army Troopers	Philippine Army	(Philippines) Melvin Carolino	(Philippines) Benjaylo Labide
PCG	Philippine Coast Guard Lifesavers	Philippine Coast Guard	(Philippines) John Sen Rivadenera	(Philippines) John Kevin Dela Vega
CSJL	Saints and Lattes-Letran Saints Spikers	Saints and Lattes Cafè / Colegio de San Juan de Letran	(Philippines) Brian Esquibel	(Philippines) Raxel Redd Catris
SRC	Santa Rosa City Lions	Sta. Rosa City	(Philippines) Edward Jan Lirio	(Philippines) Harvey Quezada
SAV	Savouge RTU-Basilan Golden Thunders	Savouge Aesthetics Philippines / RTU-Basilan	(Philippines) Sabtbl Abdul	(Philippines) Jhon Lorenz Señoron
CSB	St. Gerard Construction-Benilde Blazing Builders	St. Gerard Construction / De La Salle–College of Saint Benilde	(Philippines) Arnold Laniog	(Philippines) Bryle Gomez
NU	Sta. Elena-NU Bulldogs	Sta. Elena Construction / National University	(Philippines) Dante Alinsunurin	(Philippines) Ave Joshua Retamar
LPU	The Bayleaf Hotels-Lyceum Pirates	The Bayleaf Hotels / Lyceum of the Philippines University	(Philippines) Paul Jan Dolorias	(Philippines) Jun Edang
VNS	VNS Griffins	VNS Management Group	(Philippines) Ralph Ocampo	(Philippines) Philip Michael Bagalay
Foreign guest team
MAR	Maruichi Hyogo	Maruichi Co., Ltd. / Hyogo Prefectural U.V.F.	(Japan) Kota Kunichika	(Japan) Hinata Kuroda

=== Preliminary round ===
==== Pool A ====
Pos	Team	Pld	W	L	Pts	SW	SL	SR	SPW	SPL	SPR	Qualification
1	Sta. Elena-NU Nationals	5	4	1	12	13	3	4.333	397	318	1.248	Final round
2	Perpetual-Kinto Altas	5	4	1	10	12	7	1.714	422	381	1.108	Final round
3	Philippine Army Troopers	5	4	1	9	12	10	1.200	470	463	1.015	
4	D' Navigators Iloilo	5	2	3	8	10	9	1.111	419	405	1.035	
5	Ateneo-Fudgee Barr Blue Eagles	5	1	4	4	5	12	0.417	359	389	0.923	
6	Don Pacundo-DLSU D Patriots	5	0	5	2	4	15	0.267	333	438	0.760	

Source: TeamPilipinas.info

==== Pool B ====
Pos	Team	Pld	W	L	Pts	SW	SL	SR	SPW	SPL	SPR	Qualification
1	Cabstars–Cabuyao	5	4	1	13	14	6	2.333	468	427	1.096	Final round
2	EcoOil-La Salle Green Oilers	5	4	1	10	13	7	1.857	477	433	1.102	Final round
3	VNS Griffins	5	4	1	10	12	7	1.714	427	389	1.098	
4	MKA-San Beda Red Spikers	5	2	3	7	9	10	0.900	450	456	0.987	
5	Philippine Air Force Airmen	5	1	4	4	7	12	0.583	431	458	0.941	
6	PCU Dasmariñas-SASKIN Dolphins	5	0	5	1	2	15	0.133	320	410	0.780	

Source: TeamPilipinas.info

==== Pool C ====
Pos	Team	Pld	W	L	Pts	SW	SL	SR	SPW	SPL	SPR	Qualification
1	Cignal HD Spikers	5	5	0	14	15	3	5.000	428	352	1.216	Final round
2	Saints and Lattes-Letran Saints Spikers	5	4	1	11	12	5	2.400	390	340	1.147	Final round
3	Davies Paint-Adamson Soaring Falcons	5	3	2	11	13	8	1.625	479	447	1.072	
4	St. Gerrard Construction-Benilde Blazing Builders	5	2	3	6	8	10	0.800	430	420	1.024	
5	Santa Rosa City Lions	5	1	4	3	5	13	0.385	369	469	0.787	
6	Philippine Coast Guard Lifesavers	5	0	5	0	1	15	0.067	285	398	0.716	

Source: TeamPilipinas.info

==== Pool D ====
Pos	Team	Pld	W	L	Pts	SW	SL	SR	SPW	SPL	SPR	Qualification
1	Chef on a Diet-FEU Tamaraws	5	5	0	14	15	3	5.000	432	346	1.249	Final round
2	PGJC-Navy Sea Lions	5	4	1	12	14	6	2.333	461	380	1.213	Final round
3	Savouge RTU-Basilan Golden Thunders	5	3	2	8	10	10	1.000	450	459	0.980	
4	EAC-Xentromall Generals	5	2	3	7	10	9	1.111	426	416	1.024	
5	Alpha Omega Elite Spikers	5	1	4	4	5	13	0.385	341	418	0.816	
6	The Bayleaf Hotels-Lyceum Pirates	5	0	5	0	2	15	0.133	331	422	0.784	

Source: TeamPilipinas.info

=== Final round ===
==== Quarterfinals ====
Date	Time		Score		Set 1	Set 2	Set 3	Set 4	Set 5	Total	Report
Dec 3	11:00	Chef on a Diet-FEU Tamaraws	0–3	Perpetual-Kinto Altas	18–25	17–25	21–25			56–75	P2
Dec 3	13:00	Cignal HD Spikers	3–0	EcoOil-La Salle Green Oilers	26–24	25–18	25–19			76–61	P2
Dec 3	15:00	Cabstars–Cabuyao	0–3	Saints and Lattes-Letran Saints Spikers	24–26	19–25	21–25			64–76	P2
Dec 3	17:00	Sta. Elena-NU Nationals	3–1	PGJC-Navy Sea Lions	25–23	22–25	28–26	25–17		100–91	P2

==== Semifinals ====
Pos	Team	Pld	W	L	Pts	SW	SL	SR	SPW	SPL	SPR	Qualification
1	Cignal HD Spikers	4	4	0	12	12	0	MAX	300	220	1.364	Championship match
2	Sta. Elena-NU Nationals	4	3	1	9	9	4	2.250	307	269	1.141	Championship match
3	Saints and Lattes-Letran Saints Spikers	4	2	2	6	7	8	0.875	326	345	0.945	3rd place match
4	Maruichi Hyogo	4	1	3	3	4	9	0.444	273	317	0.861	3rd place match
5	Perpetual-Kinto Altas	4	0	4	0	1	12	0.083	274	329	0.833	

Source: TeamPilipinas.info

==== Finals ====
===== 3rd place match =====
Date	Time		Score		Set 1	Set 2	Set 3	Set 4	Set 5	Total	Report
Dec 15	15:30	Saints and Lattes-Letran Saints Spikers	2–3	Maruichi Hyogo	25–20	16–25	21–25	25–22	11–15	98–107	P2

===== Championship match =====
Date	Time		Score		Set 1	Set 2	Set 3	Set 4	Set 5	Total	Report
Dec 15	17:30	Cignal HD Spikers	2–3	Sta. Elena-NU Nationals	25–22	22–25	25–21	22–25	8–15	102–108	P2

=== Awards ===
Award	Player	Team	Ref.
Finals Most Valuable Player	Jade Disquitado	Sta. Elena-NU	
Conference Most Valuable Player	Vince Himzon	Saints and Lattes-Letran	
1st Best Outside Spiker	Joshua Umandal	Cignal	
2nd Best Outside Spiker	John Bautista	Saints and Lattes-Letran	
1st Best Middle Blocker	John Paul Bugaoan	Cignal	
2nd Best Middle Blocker	Vince Himzon	Saints and Lattes-Letran	
Best Opposite Spiker	Leo Ordiales	Sta. Elena-NU	
Best Setter	Joshua Retamar	Sta. Elena-NU	
Best Libero	Manuel Sumanguid III	Cignal	

=== Final standings ===
Rank	Team
1st place, gold medalist(s)	Sta. Elena-NU Nationals
2nd place, silver medalist(s)	Cignal HD Spikers
3rd place, bronze medalist(s)	Maruichi Hyogo
4	Saints and Lattes-Letran Saints Spikers
5	Perpetual-Kinto Altas
6	Chef on a Diet-FEU Tamaraws
7	Cabstars–Cabuyao
8	PGJC-Navy Sea Lions
9	EcoOil-La Salle Green Oilers
10	VNS Griffins
11	Philippine Army Troopers
12	Davies Paint-Adamson Soaring Falcons
13	Savouge RTU-Basilan Golden Thunders
14	D' Navigators Iloilo
15	EAC-Xentromall Generals
16	MKA-San Beda Red Spikers
17	St. Gerard Construction-Benilde Blazing Builders
18	Philippine Air Force Airmen
19	Ateneo-Fudgee Barr Blue Eagles
20	Alpha Omega Elite Spikers
21	Santa Rosa City Lions
22	Don Pacundo-DLSU Dasmariñas Patriots
23	PCU Dasmariñas-SASKIN Dolphins
24	The Bayleaf Hotels-Lyceum Pirates
25	Philippine Coast Guard Lifesavers

== Conference results ==
Conference	Champion	Runner-up	3rd	4th	5th	6th	7th	8th	9th	10th	11th	12th	13th
Open	Cignal	AMC Cotabato	Imus; AJAA	Iloilo	VNS	PGJC; Navy	Santa Rosa	Army	NU; Archipelago	Air Force	Vanguard	—N/a	
Invitational	Sta. Elena; NU	Cignal	Maruichi	Saints and Lattes-Letran	Perpetual; Kinto	Chef on a Diet; FEU	Cabuyao	PGJC; Navy	EcoOil; La Salle	VNS	Army	Davies Paint; Adamson	Savouge RTU; Basilan
Invitational	Iloilo (14th)	EAC; Xentromall (15th)	MKA; San Beda (16th)	St. Gérard Construction; Benilde (17th)	Air Force (18th)	Ateneo; Fudgee Barr (19th)	Alpha Omega (20th)	Santa Rosa (21st)	Don Pacundo; DLSU-D (22nd)	PCU D SASKIN (23rd)	Bayleaf Hotels; Lyceum (24th)	Coast Guard (25th)	—N/a

== See also ==
- 2023 Premier Volleyball League season

Preceded by 5th, 2022	Spikers' Turf; 2023	Succeeded by 7th, 2024
