= Edward Camposano =

Filipino volleyball player (born 1996)

Personal information
- Nationality: Filipino
- Born: May 11, 1996 (age 30)
- Height: 6 ft 1 in (1.85 m)
- Education: University of the East; National University

Volleyball information
- Position: Outside Hitter
- Current club: Alpha Insurance Protectors
- Number: 11

Career
Years	Teams
2017–2019	Sta. Elena Ball Hammers
2022	Cignal HD Spikers
2023	AMC Cotabato Spikers
2024	D'Navigators Iloilo
2025–present	Alpha Insurance Protectors

National team
2015	Philippines

Edward Camposano (born May 11, 1996) is a Filipino volleyball athlete. He is currently playing for the Alpha Insurance Protectors in the Spikers' Turf.

== Career ==
=== College ===
He played for UE Red Warriors collegiate men's varsity team but he transferred to NU Bulldogs after 2 years of playing in UE Red Warriors.

== Clubs ==
- (Philippines) Sta. Elena Ball Hammers (2017–2019)
- (Philippines) Cignal HD Spikers (2022)
- (Philippines) AMC Cotabato Spikers (2023)
- (Philippines) Philippine Navy Sea Lions (2023)
- (Philippines) D'Navigators Iloilo (2024)
- (Philippines) Alpha Insurance Protectors (2025–present)

== Awards ==
=== Individual ===
Year	League	Season/Conference	Award	Ref
2012	UAAP (Junior's)	UAAP Season 74	MVP (Season)	
2012	UAAP (Junior's)	UAAP Season 74	Best Attacker	
2012	UAAP (Junior's)	UAAP Season 74	Best Blocker	
2013 UAAP	UAAP (Junior's)	75 (boy's)	MVP (Season)	
2013 UAAP	UAAP (Junior's)	75 (boy's)	Best Attacker	
2013 UAAP	UAAP (Junior's)	75 (boy's)	Best Blocker	
2014	UAAP (Junior's)	76 (boy's)	MVP (Season)	
2014	UAAP (Junior's)	76 (boy's)	Best Attacker	
2015	UAAP (Men's)	77	Rookie of the Year	
2016	UAAP (Men's)	78	Best Blocker	
2017	PVL	Reinforced	Best Opposite Spiker	

=== Clubs ===
Year	League	Season/Conference	Club	Title	Ref
2019	Spikers' Turf	Open	Sta. Elena Ball Hammers	3rd place	
2022	Spikers' Turf	Open	Cignal HD Spikers	Runner-up	
2023	Spikers' Turf	Open	AMC Cotabato Spikers	Runner-up	
