= 2023 Spikers' Turf Invitational Conference =

Last Conference of the 2023 SPT season

- Duration: October 20 – December 15, 2023
- Teams: 25
- Matches: 72
- Attendance: 18,752 (260 per match)

Results
- Champions: Sta. Elena–NU Nationals
- Runners-up: Cignal HD Spikers
- Third place: Maruichi Hyogo
- Fourth place: Saints and Lattes–Letran Saints Spikers

Awards
- Conference MVP: Vince Himzon
- Finals MVP: Jade Disquitado
- Best OH: Joshua Umandal; John Bautista
- Best MB: John Paul Bugaoan; Vince Himzon
- Best OPP: Leo Ordiales
- Best Setter: Joshua Retamar
- Best Libero: Manuel Sumanguid III

Spikers' Turf Invitational Conference chronology
- 2024 >

Spikers' Turf conference chronology
- < 2023 Open 2024 Open >

The 2023 Spikers' Turf Invitational Conference was the second and final conference of the 2023 season of Spikers' Turf and the inaugural running of the Invitational Conference. The tournament began from October 20 to December 15, 2023, at the Paco Arena, Paco, Manila.

The Invitational Conference used a similar format to the 2019 Open Conference, with a larger pool of teams with a lineup of collegiate and regional-based squads competing alongside Spikers' Turf's member teams. This conference also introduces foreign guest teams, derived from its Premier Volleyball League counterpart, with Maruichi Hyogo of Japan being the league's first guest team.

The conference was won by the Sta. Elena–NU Nationals, who beat the Cignal HD Spikers in the first five-set final match in league history. Maruichi Hyogo completed the podium after beating Saints and Lattes–Letran in the third place match.

== Participating teams ==
A total of twenty-five teams participated in this conference. Twenty-four of these teams are local, some of which had its core players from the UAAP and NCAA, and then sponsored by corporate/companies. For the first time in the league's history, they catered to a foreign guest team in Maruichi Hyogo of Japan, which had a bye to the semifinals and faced the top four local teams of the conference.

2023 Spikers' Turf Invitational Conference
| Abbr. | Team | Affiliation | Head coach | Team captain |
Local teams
| APH | Alpha Omega Elite Spikers | Alpha Omega Elite | (Philippines) Edjet Mabbayad | (Philippines) Kim Tan |
| ADMU | Ateneo-Fudgee Barr Blue Eagles | Ateneo de Manila University / Republic Biscuit Corporation | (Philippines) Timmy Sto. Tomas | (Philippines) Lance Andrei De Castro |
| CAB | Cabstars–Cabuyao | Cabuyao City | (Philippines) Christian Antiporta | (Philippines) Aljune Centeno |
| CHD | Cignal HD Spikers | Cignal TV, Inc. | (Philippines) Dexter Clamor | (Philippines) Ysay Marasigan |
| FEU | Chef on a Diet-FEU Tamaraws | Chef on a Diet / Far Eastern University | (Philippines) Eddieson Orcullo | (Philippines) Jefferson Abuniawan |
| DNV | D' Navigators Iloilo | Iloilo City | (Philippines) Boyet Delmoro | (Philippines) John Michael Apolinario |
| ADU | Davies Paint-Adamson Soaring Falcons | Davies Paints Philippines / Adamson University | (Philippines) George Pascua | (Philippines) John Eugenio Gay |
| DLSD | Don Pacundo-DLSU Dasmariñas Patriots | Don Pacundo Sportswear / De La Salle University – Dasmariñas | (Philippines) Jerome Roland Mirano | (Philippines) Valeriano Sasis |
| EAC | EAC-Xentromall Generals | ARMC Holdings Company, Inc. / Emilio Aguinaldo College | (Philippines) Rodrigo Palmero | (Philippines) Bhim Lawrence Diones |
| DLSU | EcoOil-La Salle Green Oilers | Eco Oil Ltd. / De La Salle University | (Philippines) Jose Monsol Roque | (Philippines) John Mark Ronquillo |
| SBU | MKA-San Beda Red Spikers | MKA / San Beda University | (Philippines) Ariel Dela Cruz | (Philippines) Aidjien Josh Rus |
| PCU | PCU Dasmariñas-SASKIN Dolphins | Philippine Christian University Dasmariñas / SASKIN | (Philippines) Reygan Espera | (Philippines) Lan Carlo Agatep |
| UPHSD | Perpetual-Kinto Altas | University of Perpetual Help System DALTA / Kinto Tyres Philippines | (Philippines) Sammy Acaylar | (Philippines) John Christian Enarciso |
| PGJC | PGJC-Navy Sea Lions | Philippine Navy | (Philippines) Cecille Cruzada | (Philippines) Marvin Hairami |
| PAF | Philippine Air Force Airmen | Philippine Air Force | (Philippines) Jhimson Merza | (Philippines) Rodolfo Labrador |
| PAT | Philippine Army Troopers | Philippine Army | (Philippines) Melvin Carolino | (Philippines) Benjaylo Labide |
| PCG | Philippine Coast Guard Lifesavers | Philippine Coast Guard | (Philippines) John Sen Rivadenera | (Philippines) John Kevin Dela Vega |
| CSJL | Saints and Lattes-Letran Saints Spikers | Saints and Lattes Cafè / Colegio de San Juan de Letran | (Philippines) Brian Esquibel | (Philippines) Raxel Redd Catris |
| SRC | Santa Rosa City Lions | Sta. Rosa City | (Philippines) Edward Jan Lirio | (Philippines) Harvey Quezada |
| SAV | Savouge RTU-Basilan Golden Thunders | Savouge Aesthetics Philippines / RTU-Basilan | (Philippines) Sabtbl Abdul | (Philippines) Jhon Lorenz Señoron |
| CSB | St. Gerard Construction-Benilde Blazing Builders | St. Gerard Construction / De La Salle–College of Saint Benilde | (Philippines) Arnold Laniog | (Philippines) Bryle Gomez |
| NU | Sta. Elena-NU Bulldogs | Sta. Elena Construction / National University | (Philippines) Dante Alinsunurin | (Philippines) Ave Joshua Retamar |
| LPU | The Bayleaf Hotels-Lyceum Pirates | The Bayleaf Hotels / Lyceum of the Philippines University | (Philippines) Paul Jan Dolorias | (Philippines) Jun Edang |
| VNS | VNS Griffins | VNS Management Group | (Philippines) Ralph Ocampo | (Philippines) Philip Michael Bagalay |
Foreign guest team
| MAR | Maruichi Hyogo | Maruichi Co., Ltd. / Hyogo Prefectural U.V.F. | (Japan) Kota Kunichika | (Japan) Hinata Kuroda |

== Pools composition ==
| Pool A | Pool B | Pool C | Pool D |
|---|---|---|---|
| Ateneo-Fudgee Barr Blue Eagles | Cabstars–Cabuyao | Cignal HD Spikers | Alpha Omega Elite Spikers |
| D' Navigators Iloilo | EcoOil-La Salle Green Oilers | Davies Paint-Adamson Soaring Falcons | Chef on a Diet-FEU Tamaraws |
| Don Pacundo-DLSU Dasmariñas Patriots | MKA-San Beda Red Spikers | Philippine Coast Guard Lifesavers | EAC-Xentromall Generals |
| Perpetual-Kinto Altas | PCU Dasmariñas-SASKIN Dolphins | Saints and Lattes-Letran Saints Spikers | PGJC-Navy Sea Lions |
| Philippine Army Troopers | Philippine Air Force Airmen | Santa Rosa City Lions | Savouge RTU-Basilan Golden Thunders |
| Sta. Elena-NU Nationals | VNS Griffins | St. Gerard Construction-Benilde Blazing Builders | The Bayleaf Hotels-Lyceum Pirates |

== Venues ==
| Preliminary round | Final round | |
|---|---|---|
| Manila | San Juan | Pasig |
| Paco Arena | Filoil EcoOil Centre | PhilSports Arena |
| Capacity: 1,000 | Capacity: 6,000 | Capacity: 10,000 |

== Transactions ==
=== Team additions and transfers ===
The following are the players who transferred to another team for the upcoming conference.

| Player | Moving from | Moving to | Ref. |
|---|---|---|---|
| (Philippines) Anfernee Curamen | Arellano Chiefs | Alpha Omega Elite Spikers | |
| (Philippines) Arman Clarence Guinto | Arellano Chiefs | Alpha Omega Elite Spikers | |
| (Philippines) France Lander Racaza | FEU Tamaraws | Alpha Omega Elite Spikers | |
| (Philippines) Ivan Encila | Arellano Chiefs | Alpha Omega Elite Spikers | |
| (Philippines) Jan Laurence Teo | NCBA Wildcats | Alpha Omega Elite Spikers | |
| (Philippines) Jethro Cabillan | Arellano Chiefs | Alpha Omega Elite Spikers | |
| (Philippines) John Carlo Desuyo | Vanguard Volley Hitters | Alpha Omega Elite Spikers | |
| (Philippines) John Daniel Diwa | Vanguard Volley Hitters | Alpha Omega Elite Spikers | |
| (Philippines) Kim Vincent Tan | Arellano Chiefs | Alpha Omega Elite Spikers | |
| (Philippines) Michael Jhon Fortuna | NU-Sta. Elena Ball Hammers | Alpha Omega Elite Spikers | |
| (Philippines) Razzel Palisoc | Vanguard Volley Hitters | Alpha Omega Elite Spikers | |
| (Philippines) Ricardo Alfaro | Vanguard Volley Hitters | Alpha Omega Elite Spikers | |
| (Philippines) Stephen John Sundiang | Ateneo Blue Knights | Alpha Omega Elite Spikers | |
| (Philippines) Edward Camposano | AMC Cotabato Spikers | PGJC Navy Sea Lions | |

== Format ==
Preliminary round

- In the preliminary round, teams were split into four pools of six.
- The preliminary round was a single round-robin tournament involving all 24 local teams, with each team playing one match against all other teams in their pool for a total of five matches.
- The top two teams from each group advanced to the quarterfinals while the bottom four were eliminated.

Quarterfinals
Semifinals

- The semifinals was also a single round-robin, now including the international guest team. Each team played a total of four matches during this round.
- The top two teams advanced to the championship while teams ranked third and fourth would play in the third-place series. The fifth-place team was eliminated.

Finals

- The championship and third-place series were single-elimination matches.
- The match-ups were as follows:
  - Championship: SF#1 vs. SF#2
  - Third-place series: SF#3 vs. SF#4

== Pool standing procedure ==
- First, teams are ranked by the number of matches won.
- If the number of matches won is tied, the tied teams are then ranked by match points, wherein:
  - Match won 3–0 or 3–1: 3 match points for the winner, 0 match points for the loser.
  - Match won 3–2: 2 match points for the winner, 1 match point for the loser.
- In case of any further ties, the following criteria shall be used:
  - Set ratio: the number of sets won divided by number of sets lost.
  - Point ratio: number of points scored divided by number of points allowed.
  - Head-to-head standings: any remaining tied teams are ranked based on the results of head-to-head matches involving the teams in question.

== Preliminary round ==
- All times are Philippine Standard Time (UTC+08:00).

=== Pool A ===
| Pos | Team | Pld | W | L | Pts | SW | SL | SR | SPW | SPL | SPR | Qualification |
|---|---|---|---|---|---|---|---|---|---|---|---|---|
| 1 | Sta. Elena-NU Nationals | 5 | 4 | 1 | 12 | 13 | 3 | 4.333 | 397 | 318 | 1.248 | Final round |
| 2 | Perpetual-Kinto Altas | 5 | 4 | 1 | 10 | 12 | 7 | 1.714 | 422 | 381 | 1.108 | Final round |
| 3 | Philippine Army Troopers | 5 | 4 | 1 | 9 | 12 | 10 | 1.200 | 470 | 463 | 1.015 | |
| 4 | D' Navigators Iloilo | 5 | 2 | 3 | 8 | 10 | 9 | 1.111 | 419 | 405 | 1.035 | |
| 5 | Ateneo-Fudgee Barr Blue Eagles | 5 | 1 | 4 | 4 | 5 | 12 | 0.417 | 359 | 389 | 0.923 | |
| 6 | Don Pacundo-DLSU D Patriots | 5 | 0 | 5 | 2 | 4 | 15 | 0.267 | 333 | 438 | 0.760 | |

Source: TeamPilipinas.info

| Date | Time | | Score | | Set 1 | Set 2 | Set 3 | Set 4 | Set 5 | Total | Report |
|---|---|---|---|---|---|---|---|---|---|---|---|
| Oct 20 | 17:30 | Ateneo-Fudgee Barr Blue Eagles | 3–0 | Don Pacundo-DLSU D Patriots | 25–19 | 25–18 | 25–20 | | | 75–57 | P2 |
| Oct 22 | 13:00 | D' Navigators Iloilo | 2–3 | Philippine Army Troopers | 25–21 | 14–25 | 19–25 | 25–21 | 12–15 | 95–107 | P2 |
| Oct 25 | 13:00 | Sta. Elena–NU Nationals | 3–0 | Perpetual-Kinto Altas | 25–18 | 25–17 | 25–18 | | | 75–53 | P2 |
| Oct 27 | 15:30 | Don Pacundo-DLSU D Patriots | 0–3 | D' Navigators Iloilo | 16–25 | 17–25 | 16–25 | | | 49–75 | P2 |
| Oct 29 | 15:00 | Perpetual-Kinto Altas | 3–0 | Philippine Army Troopers | 25–18 | 25–14 | 25–16 | | | 75–48 | P2 |
| Nov 05 | 13:00 | Ateneo-Fudgee Barr Blue Eagles | 0–3 | Sta. Elena–NU Nationals | 20–25 | 23–25 | 23–25 | | | 66–75 | P2 |
| Nov 08 | 13:00 | D' Navigators Iloilo | 2–3 | Perpetual-Kinto Altas | 22–25 | 25–22 | 18–25 | 25–20 | 22–24 | 112–116 | P2 |
| Nov 10 | 13:00 | Sta. Elena–NU Nationals | 3–0 | Don Pacundo-DLSU D Patriots | 25–10 | 25–18 | 25–18 | | | 75–46 | P2 |
| Nov 12 | 15:00 | Philippine Army Troopers | 3–2 | Ateneo-Fudgee Barr Blue Eagles | 22–25 | 19–25 | 26–24 | 25–19 | 15–10 | 107–103 | P2 |
| Nov 15 | 13:00 | Sta. Elena–NU Nationals | 3–0 | D' Navigators Iloilo | 31–29 | 25–16 | 25–17 | | | 81–62 | P2 |
| Nov 19 | 17:00 | D' Navigators Iloilo | 3–0 | Ateneo-Fudgee Barr Blue Eagles | 25–17 | 25–15 | 25–19 | | | 75–51 | P2 |
| Nov 22 | 13:00 | Don Pacundo-DLSU D Patriots | 2–3 | Philippine Army Troopers | 21–25 | 28–26 | 25–19 | 14–25 | 11–15 | 99–110 | P2 |
| Nov 24 | 15:00 | Ateneo-Fudgee Barr Blue Eagles | 0–3 | Perpetual-Kinto Altas | 23–25 | 21–25 | 20–25 | | | 64–75 | P2 |
| Nov 26 | 13:00 | Philippine Army Troopers | 3–1 | Sta. Elena–NU Nationals | 25–22 | 22–25 | 25–22 | 25–22 | | 97–91 | P2 |
| Nov 29 | 15:00 | Perpetual-Kinto Altas | 3–2 | Don Pacundo-DLSU D Patriots | 25–10 | 19–25 | 25–16 | 19–25 | 15–6 | 103–82 | P2 |

=== Pool B ===
| Pos | Team | Pld | W | L | Pts | SW | SL | SR | SPW | SPL | SPR | Qualification |
|---|---|---|---|---|---|---|---|---|---|---|---|---|
| 1 | Cabstars–Cabuyao | 5 | 4 | 1 | 13 | 14 | 6 | 2.333 | 468 | 427 | 1.096 | Final round |
| 2 | EcoOil-La Salle Green Oilers | 5 | 4 | 1 | 10 | 13 | 7 | 1.857 | 477 | 433 | 1.102 | Final round |
| 3 | VNS Griffins | 5 | 4 | 1 | 10 | 12 | 7 | 1.714 | 427 | 389 | 1.098 | |
| 4 | MKA-San Beda Red Spikers | 5 | 2 | 3 | 7 | 9 | 10 | 0.900 | 450 | 456 | 0.987 | |
| 5 | Philippine Air Force Airmen | 5 | 1 | 4 | 4 | 7 | 12 | 0.583 | 431 | 458 | 0.941 | |
| 6 | PCU Dasmariñas-SASKIN Dolphins | 5 | 0 | 5 | 1 | 2 | 15 | 0.133 | 320 | 410 | 0.780 | |

Source: TeamPilipinas.info

| Date | Time | | Score | | Set 1 | Set 2 | Set 3 | Set 4 | Set 5 | Total | Report |
|---|---|---|---|---|---|---|---|---|---|---|---|
| Oct 20 | 15:30 | EcoOil-La Salle Green Oilers | 3–0 | VNS Griffins | 25–23 | 25–20 | 25–20 | | | 75–63 | P2 |
| Oct 22 | 15:00 | PCU Dasmariñas-SASKIN Dolphins | 0–3 | Philippine Air Force Airmen | 18–25 | 22–25 | 24–26 | | | 64–76 | P2 |
| Oct 25 | 15:00 | Cabstars–Cabuyao | 3–1 | MKA-San Beda Red Spikers | 24–26 | 27–25 | 25–22 | 26–24 | | 102–97 | P2 |
| Oct 29 | 11:00 | EcoOil-La Salle Green Oilers | 3–0 | PCU Dasmariñas-SASKIN Dolphins | 25–18 | 25–11 | 25–22 | | | 75–51 | P2 |
| Nov 05 | 11:00 | MKA-San Beda Red Spikers | 3–1 | Philippine Air Force Airmen | 25–22 | 28–30 | 25–23 | 25–19 | | 103–94 | P2 |
| Nov 08 | 15:00 | PCU Dasmariñas-SASKIN Dolphins | 2–3 | VNS Griffins | 13–25 | 17–25 | 25–23 | 25–21 | 10–15 | 90–109 | P2 |
| Nov 10 | 17:00 | Philippine Air Force Airmen | 1–3 | Cabstars–Cabuyao | 22–25 | 25–20 | 21–25 | 21–25 | | 89–95 | P2 |
| Nov 12 | 17:00 | MKA-San Beda Red Spikers | 2–3 | EcoOil-La Salle Green Oilers | 18–25 | 22–25 | 25–22 | 25–21 | 20–22 | 110–115 | P2 |
| Nov 15 | 11:00 | VNS Griffins | 3–2 | Cabstars–Cabuyao | 25–19 | 18–25 | 18–25 | 25–21 | 15–12 | 101–102 | P2 |
| Nov 17 | 13:00 | PCU Dasmariñas-SASKIN Dolphins | 0–3 | Cabstars–Cabuyao | 11–25 | 19–25 | 19–25 | | | 49–75 | P2 |
| Nov 19 | 15:00 | EcoOil-La Salle Green Oilers | 3–2 | Philippine Air Force Airmen | 37–35 | 23–25 | 25–18 | 21–25 | 15–12 | 121–115 | P2 |
| Nov 22 | 15:00 | VNS Griffins | 3–0 | MKA-San Beda Red Spikers | 29–27 | 25–19 | 25–19 | | | 79–65 | P2 |
| Nov 24 | 13:00 | Cabstars–Cabuyao | 3–1 | EcoOil-La Salle Green Oilers | 25–23 | 19–25 | 25–21 | 25–22 | | 94–91 | P2 |
| Nov 26 | 11:00 | MKA-San Beda Red Spikers | 3–0 | PCU Dasmariñas-SASKIN Dolphins | 25–22 | 25–21 | 25–23 | | | 75–66 | P2 |
| Dec 01 | 17:00 | Philippine Air Force Airmen | 0–3 | VNS Griffins | 16–25 | 18–25 | 23–25 | | | 57–75 | P2 |

=== Pool C ===
| Pos | Team | Pld | W | L | Pts | SW | SL | SR | SPW | SPL | SPR | Qualification |
|---|---|---|---|---|---|---|---|---|---|---|---|---|
| 1 | Cignal HD Spikers | 5 | 5 | 0 | 14 | 15 | 3 | 5.000 | 428 | 352 | 1.216 | Final round |
| 2 | Saints and Lattes-Letran Saints Spikers | 5 | 4 | 1 | 11 | 12 | 5 | 2.400 | 390 | 340 | 1.147 | Final round |
| 3 | Davies Paint-Adamson Soaring Falcons | 5 | 3 | 2 | 11 | 13 | 8 | 1.625 | 479 | 447 | 1.072 | |
| 4 | St. Gerrard Construction-Benilde Blazing Builders | 5 | 2 | 3 | 6 | 8 | 10 | 0.800 | 430 | 420 | 1.024 | |
| 5 | Santa Rosa City Lions | 5 | 1 | 4 | 3 | 5 | 13 | 0.385 | 369 | 469 | 0.787 | |
| 6 | Philippine Coast Guard Lifesavers | 5 | 0 | 5 | 0 | 1 | 15 | 0.067 | 285 | 398 | 0.716 | |

Source: TeamPilipinas.info

| Date | Time | | Score | | Set 1 | Set 2 | Set 3 | Set 4 | Set 5 | Total | Report |
|---|---|---|---|---|---|---|---|---|---|---|---|
| Oct 22 | 17:00 | Philippine Coast Guard Lifesavers | 0–3 | Davies Paint-Adamson Soaring Falcons | 19–25 | 22–25 | 14–25 | | | 55–75 | P2 |
| Oct 25 | 11:00 | Saints and Lattes-Letran Saints Spikers | 3–0 | Santa Rosa City Lions | 25–21 | 25–16 | 25–18 | | | 75–55 | P2 |
| Oct 29 | 17:00 | Santa Rosa City Lions | 0–3 | Cignal HD Spikers | 22–25 | 10–25 | 21–25 | | | 53–75 | P2 |
| Nov 03 | 13:00 | St. Gerrard Construction-Benilde Blazing Builders | 3–0 | Philippine Coast Guard Lifesavers | 25–15 | 25–16 | 25–20 | | | 75–51 | P2 |
| Nov 03 | 15:00 | Cignal HD Spikers | 3–0 | Saints and Lattes-Letran Saints Spikers | 25–17 | 25–14 | 25–23 | | | 75–54 | P2 |
| Nov 05 | 15:00 | Davies Paint-Adamson Soaring Falcons | 3–1 | Santa Rosa City Lions | 25–15 | 25–16 | 16–25 | 25–21 | | 91–77 | P2 |
| Nov 08 | 17:00 | Philippine Coast Guard Lifesavers | 0–3 | Cignal HD Spikers | 18–25 | 16–25 | 17–25 | | | 51–75 | P2 |
| Nov 12 | 11:00 | St. Gerrard Construction-Benilde Blazing Builders | 1–3 | Davies Paint-Adamson Soaring Falcons | 37–39 | 25–23 | 17–25 | 18–25 | | 97–112 | P2 |
| Nov 15 | 17:00 | Saints and Lattes-Letran Saints Spikers | 3–0 | St. Gerrard Construction-Benilde Blazing Builders | 25–21 | 25–23 | 25–23 | | | 75–67 | P2 |
| Nov 17 | 17:00 | Cignal HD Spikers | 3–1 | St. Gerrard Construction-Benilde Blazing Builders | 25–21 | 21–25 | 25–21 | 26–24 | | 97–91 | P2 |
| Nov 19 | 11:00 | Davies Paint-Adamson Soaring Falcons | 2–3 | Saints and Lattes-Letran Saints Spikers | 25–20 | 28–26 | 16–25 | 17–25 | 12–15 | 98–111 | P2 |
| Nov 22 | 17:00 | Santa Rosa City Lions | 3–1 | Philippine Coast Guard Lifesavers | 25–22 | 23–25 | 25–21 | 25–15 | | 98–83 | P2 |
| Nov 26 | 17:00 | Davies Paint-Adamson Soaring Falcons | 2–3 | Cignal HD Spikers | 25–18 | 22–25 | 21–25 | 25–23 | 10–15 | 103–106 | P2 |
| Nov 29 | 13:00 | St. Gerrard Construction-Benilde Blazing Builders | 3–1 | Santa Rosa City Lions | 25–17 | 25–27 | 25–20 | 25–21 | | 100–85 | P2 |
| Dec 01 | 13:00 | Philippine Coast Guard Lifesavers | 0–3 | Saints and Lattes-Letran Saints Spikers | 18–25 | 6–25 | 21–25 | | | 45–75 | P2 |

=== Pool D ===
| Pos | Team | Pld | W | L | Pts | SW | SL | SR | SPW | SPL | SPR | Qualification |
|---|---|---|---|---|---|---|---|---|---|---|---|---|
| 1 | Chef on a Diet-FEU Tamaraws | 5 | 5 | 0 | 14 | 15 | 3 | 5.000 | 432 | 346 | 1.249 | Final round |
| 2 | PGJC-Navy Sea Lions | 5 | 4 | 1 | 12 | 14 | 6 | 2.333 | 461 | 380 | 1.213 | Final round |
| 3 | Savouge RTU-Basilan Golden Thunders | 5 | 3 | 2 | 8 | 10 | 10 | 1.000 | 450 | 459 | 0.980 | |
| 4 | EAC-Xentromall Generals | 5 | 2 | 3 | 7 | 10 | 9 | 1.111 | 426 | 416 | 1.024 | |
| 5 | Alpha Omega Elite Spikers | 5 | 1 | 4 | 4 | 5 | 13 | 0.385 | 341 | 418 | 0.816 | |
| 6 | The Bayleaf Hotels-Lyceum Pirates | 5 | 0 | 5 | 0 | 2 | 15 | 0.133 | 331 | 422 | 0.784 | |

Source: TeamPilipinas.info

| Date | Time | | Score | | Set 1 | Set 2 | Set 3 | Set 4 | Set 5 | Total | Report |
|---|---|---|---|---|---|---|---|---|---|---|---|
| Oct 22 | 11:00 | Chef on a Diet-FEU Tamaraws | 3–2 | PGJC-Navy Sea Lions | 21–25 | 23–25 | 26–24 | 25–19 | 15–12 | 110–105 | P2 |
| Oct 25 | 17:00 | Savouge RTU-Basilan Golden Thunders | 3–1 | The Bayleaf Hotels-Lyceum Pirates | 25–16 | 25–23 | 24–26 | 27–25 | | 101–90 | P2 |
| Oct 27 | 17:30 | Alpha Omega Elite Spikers | 0–3 | EAC-Xentromall Generals | 17–25 | 17–25 | 23–25 | | | 57–75 | P2 |
| Oct 29 | 13:00 | The Bayleaf Hotels-Lyceum Pirates | 0–3 | Chef on a Diet-FEU Tamaraws | 12–25 | 15–25 | 22–25 | | | 49–75 | P2 |
| Nov 03 | 17:00 | Savouge RTU-Basilan Golden Thunders | 3–2 | Alpha Omega Elite Spikers | 25–16 | 25–23 | 19–25 | 23–25 | 15–10 | 107–99 | P2 |
| Nov 05 | 17:00 | EAC-Xentromall Generals | 2–3 | PGJC-Navy Sea Lions | 17–25 | 25–22 | 13–25 | 25–21 | 12–15 | 92–108 | P2 |
| Nov 10 | 15:00 | PGJC-Navy Sea Lions | 3–1 | Savouge RTU-Basilan Golden Thunders | 25–23 | 23–25 | 25–21 | 25–11 | | 98–80 | P2 |
| Nov 12 | 13:00 | Alpha Omega Elite Spikers | 3–1 | The Bayleaf Hotels-Lyceum Pirates | 25–22 | 25–21 | 19–25 | 25–18 | | 94–86 | P2 |
| Nov 15 | 15:00 | Chef on a Diet-FEU Tamaraws | 3–1 | EAC-Xentromall Generals | 25–20 | 25–19 | 22–25 | 25–21 | | 97–85 | P2 |
| Nov 17 | 15:00 | The Bayleaf Hotels-Lyceum Pirates | 0–3 | PGJC-Navy Sea Lions | 20–25 | 15–25 | 19–25 | | | 54–75 | P2 |
| Nov 19 | 13:00 | EAC-Xentromall Generals | 1–3 | Savouge RTU-Basilan Golden Thunders | 25–20 | 30–32 | 20–25 | 22–25 | | 97–102 | P2 |
| Nov 24 | 17:00 | Alpha Omega Elite Spikers | 0–3 | Chef on a Diet-FEU Tamaraws | 17–25 | 18–25 | 12–25 | | | 47–75 | P2 |
| Nov 26 | 15:00 | The Bayleaf Hotels-Lyceum Pirates | 0–3 | EAC-Xentromall Generals | 13–25 | 25–27 | 14–25 | | | 52–77 | P2 |
| Nov 29 | 17:00 | PGJC-Navy Sea Lions | 3–0 | Alpha Omega Elite Spikers | 25–14 | 25–17 | 25–13 | | | 75–44 | P2 |
| Dec 01 | 15:00 | Chef on a Diet-FEU Tamaraws | 3–0 | Savouge RTU-Basilan Golden Thunders | 25–19 | 25–20 | 25–21 | | | 75–60 | P2 |

== Final round ==
- All times are Philippine Standard Time (UTC+8:00).

=== Quarterfinals ===
| Date | Time | | Score | | Set 1 | Set 2 | Set 3 | Set 4 | Set 5 | Total | Report |
|---|---|---|---|---|---|---|---|---|---|---|---|
| Dec 3 | 11:00 | Chef on a Diet-FEU Tamaraws | 0–3 | Perpetual-Kinto Altas | 18–25 | 17–25 | 21–25 | | | 56–75 | P2 |
| Dec 3 | 13:00 | Cignal HD Spikers | 3–0 | EcoOil-La Salle Green Oilers | 26–24 | 25–18 | 25–19 | | | 76–61 | P2 |
| Dec 3 | 15:00 | Cabstars–Cabuyao | 0–3 | Saints and Lattes-Letran Saints Spikers | 24–26 | 19–25 | 21–25 | | | 64–76 | P2 |
| Dec 3 | 17:00 | Sta. Elena-NU Nationals | 3–1 | PGJC-Navy Sea Lions | 25–23 | 22–25 | 28–26 | 25–17 | | 100–91 | P2 |

=== Semifinals ===
| Pos | Team | Pld | W | L | Pts | SW | SL | SR | SPW | SPL | SPR | Qualification |
|---|---|---|---|---|---|---|---|---|---|---|---|---|
| 1 | Cignal HD Spikers | 4 | 4 | 0 | 12 | 12 | 0 | MAX | 300 | 220 | 1.364 | Championship match |
| 2 | Sta. Elena-NU Nationals | 4 | 3 | 1 | 9 | 9 | 4 | 2.250 | 307 | 269 | 1.141 | Championship match |
| 3 | Saints and Lattes-Letran Saints Spikers | 4 | 2 | 2 | 6 | 7 | 8 | 0.875 | 326 | 345 | 0.945 | 3rd place match |
| 4 | Maruichi Hyogo | 4 | 1 | 3 | 3 | 4 | 9 | 0.444 | 273 | 317 | 0.861 | 3rd place match |
| 5 | Perpetual-Kinto Altas | 4 | 0 | 4 | 0 | 1 | 12 | 0.083 | 274 | 329 | 0.833 | |

Source: TeamPilipinas.info

| Date | Time | | Score | | Set 1 | Set 2 | Set 3 | Set 4 | Set 5 | Total | Report |
|---|---|---|---|---|---|---|---|---|---|---|---|
| Dec 6 | 15:30 | Cignal HD Spikers | 3–0 | Sta. Elena-NU Nationals | 25–18 | 25–20 | 25–21 | | | 75–59 | P2 |
| Dec 6 | 17:30 | Saints and Lattes-Letran Saints Spikers | 3–1 | Perpetual-Kinto Altas | 26–24 | 25–22 | 24–26 | 25–19 | | 100–91 | P2 |
| Dec 8 | 15:30 | Sta. Elena-NU Nationals | 3–1 | Saints and Lattes-Letran Saints Spikers | 25–19 | 23–25 | 25–23 | 25–13 | | 98–80 | P2 |
| Dec 8 | 17:30 | Cignal HD Spikers | 3–0 | Maruichi Hyogo | 25–17 | 25–20 | 25–19 | | | 75–56 | P2 |
| Dec 9 | 09:00 | Perpetual-Kinto Altas | 0–3 | Sta. Elena-NU Nationals | 21–25 | 15–25 | 21–25 | | | 57–75 | P2 |
| Dec 9 | 11:00 | Maruichi Hyogo | 1–3 | Saints and Lattes-Letran Saints Spikers | 25–23 | 13–25 | 23–25 | 20–25 | | 81–98 | P2 |
| Dec 11 | 15:30 | Cignal HD Spikers | 3–0 | Perpetual-Kinto Altas | 25–15 | 25–23 | 25–19 | | | 75–57 | P2 |
| Dec 11 | 17:30 | Sta. Elena-NU Nationals | 3–0 | Maruichi Hyogo | 25–19 | 25–20 | 25–18 | | | 75–57 | P2 |
| Dec 12 | 09:00 | Saints and Lattes-Letran Saints Spikers | 0–3 | Cignal HD Spikers | 10–25 | 18–25 | 20–25 | | | 48–75 | P2 |
| Dec 12 | 11:00 | Maruichi Hyogo | 3–0 | Perpetual-Kinto Altas | 29–27 | 25–20 | 25–22 | | | 79–69 | P2 |

=== Finals ===
==== 3rd place match ====
| Date | Time | | Score | | Set 1 | Set 2 | Set 3 | Set 4 | Set 5 | Total | Report |
|---|---|---|---|---|---|---|---|---|---|---|---|
| Dec 15 | 15:30 | Saints and Lattes-Letran Saints Spikers | 2–3 | Maruichi Hyogo | 25–20 | 16–25 | 21–25 | 25–22 | 11–15 | 98–107 | P2 |

==== Championship match ====
| Date | Time | | Score | | Set 1 | Set 2 | Set 3 | Set 4 | Set 5 | Total | Report |
|---|---|---|---|---|---|---|---|---|---|---|---|
| Dec 15 | 17:30 | Cignal HD Spikers | 2–3 | Sta. Elena-NU Nationals | 25–22 | 22–25 | 25–21 | 22–25 | 8–15 | 102–108 | P2 |

== Awards ==
| Award | Player | Team | Ref. |
|---|---|---|---|
| Finals Most Valuable Player | Jade Disquitado | Sta. Elena-NU | |
| Conference Most Valuable Player | Vince Himzon | Saints and Lattes-Letran | |
| 1st Best Outside Spiker | Joshua Umandal | Cignal | |
| 2nd Best Outside Spiker | John Bautista | Saints and Lattes-Letran | |
| 1st Best Middle Blocker | John Paul Bugaoan | Cignal | |
| 2nd Best Middle Blocker | Vince Himzon | Saints and Lattes-Letran | |
| Best Opposite Spiker | Leo Ordiales | Sta. Elena-NU | |
| Best Setter | Joshua Retamar | Sta. Elena-NU | |
| Best Libero | Manuel Sumanguid III | Cignal | |

== Final standings ==
| Rank | Team |
|---|---|
| 1st place, gold medalist(s) | Sta. Elena-NU Nationals |
| 2nd place, silver medalist(s) | Cignal HD Spikers |
| 3rd place, bronze medalist(s) | Maruichi Hyogo |
| 4 | Saints and Lattes-Letran Saints Spikers |
| 5 | Perpetual-Kinto Altas |
| 6 | Chef on a Diet-FEU Tamaraws |
| 7 | Cabstars–Cabuyao |
| 8 | PGJC-Navy Sea Lions |
| 9 | EcoOil-La Salle Green Oilers |
| 10 | VNS Griffins |
| 11 | Philippine Army Troopers |
| 12 | Davies Paint-Adamson Soaring Falcons |
| 13 | Savouge RTU-Basilan Golden Thunders |
| 14 | D' Navigators Iloilo |
| 15 | EAC-Xentromall Generals |
| 16 | MKA-San Beda Red Spikers |
| 17 | St. Gerard Construction-Benilde Blazing Builders |
| 18 | Philippine Air Force Airmen |
| 19 | Ateneo-Fudgee Barr Blue Eagles |
| 20 | Alpha Omega Elite Spikers |
| 21 | Santa Rosa City Lions |
| 22 | Don Pacundo-DLSU Dasmariñas Patriots |
| 23 | PCU Dasmariñas-SASKIN Dolphins |
| 24 | The Bayleaf Hotels-Lyceum Pirates |
| 25 | Philippine Coast Guard Lifesavers |

2023 Spikers' Turf Invitational champions
Sta. Elena-NU Nationals
Second title

Team roster:
Nico Almendras, Greg Augustus Luis Ancheta, Michael Jonas Hernandez, Jan Llanfred Abanilla, Michaelo Buddin, Kharylle Rhoy Parce, John Mariano Sumagui, Louis Emmanuel Lumanlan, Obed Mukaba, Jade Disquitado, Rwenzmel Taguibolos, Joshua Retamar (c), John Vincent Estrada, Clarenz Belostrino, Leo Ordiales, Leo Aringo, Joelbert Doromal, Jenngerard Arnfranz Diao, Mac Arvin Bandola, Jimwell Gapultos
Head coach:
Dante Alinsunurin

== See also ==
- 2023 Premier Volleyball League Second All-Filipino Conference
