= Imus City–AJAA Spikers =

Filipino men's volleyball team

- Manager: Sammy Acaylar
- League: Spikers' Turf
- 2023 Open: 3rd place

The Imus City–AJAA Spikers (stylized as A✓AA) were a men's volleyball team in the Philippines representing Imus, Cavite. The team competed in Spikers' Turf in 2023.

== History ==
The Imus City Spikers debuted at the 2022 PNVF Champions League for Men where they finished third.

Sponsored by Ivy Tuason Photography, Imus would enter the Spikers' Turf and play in the 2023 Open Conference.

== Honors ==
Season	Conference	Title	Source
2023	Open	3rd place	
2023	Invitational	did not compete	
