= Jayvee Sumagaysay =

Filipino volleyball player

Personal information
- Nationality: Filipino
- Height: 6 ft 2 in (1.88 m)
- Education: University of Santo Tomas

Volleyball information
- Position: Middle Blocker
- Current club: VNS-Laticrete Griffins
- Number: 7

Jayvee Sumagaysay is a Filipino volleyball athlete. He played with UST Growling Tigers collegiate men's University team. He is currently playing for the VNS-Laticrete Griffins in the Spikers' Turf.

== Career ==
=== UAAP ===
Sumagaysay was a member of the UST Growling Tigers men's collegiate volleyball team.

=== Sarawak Hornbill ===
In 2022, he became an import of the Sawarak Hornbill in Malaysia.

== Clubs ==
- (Philippines) Philippine Army Troopers (2017)
- (Philippines) PLDT Home Fibr Power Hitters (2018 - 2019)
- (Philippines) Team Dasma Monarchs (2021)
- (Malaysia) Sarawak Hornbill (2022)
- (Philippines) AMC Cotabato Spikers (2022 - 2023)
- (Philippines) D'Navigators Iloilo (2024)
- (Philippines) VNS-Laticrete Griffins (2025–present)

== Awards ==
=== Individual ===
Year	League	Season/Conference	Award	Ref
2017	PVL	Reinforced	1st Best Middle Blocker	
2018	PVL	Collegiate	2nd Best Middle Blocker	
2018	PVL	Open	2nd Best Middle Blocker	
2021	PNVF	Champions League	1st Best Middle Blocker	
2024	PNVF	Champions League	1st Best Middle Blocker	

=== Collegiate ===
Year	League	Season/Conference	Title	Ref
2016	Spikers' Turf	Collegiate	3rd place	
2017	PVL	Collegiate	3rd place	
2018	PVL	Collegiate	Runner-up	

=== Clubs ===
Year	League	Season/Conference	Club	Title	Ref
2017	PVL	Reinforced	Philippine Army Troopers	3rd place	
2018	Spikers' Turf	Open	PLDT Home Fibr Power Hitters	Runner-up	
2019	Spikers' Turf	Reinforced	PLDT Home Fibr Power Hitters	3rd place	
2021	PNVF	Champions League	Team Dasma Monarchs	Champions	
2022	PNVF	Champions League	Pikit-North Cotabato G-Spikers	Runner-up	
2023	Spikers' Turf	Open	AMC Cotabato Spikers	Runner-up	
2024	PNVF	Champions League	D'Navigators Iloilo	Runner-up	
