= 2024 PNVF Champions League for Men =

Philippine men's volleyball tournament

Tournament details
- Dates: February 11–17, 2024
- Teams: 8
- Venue: Rizal Memorial Coliseum

Final positions
- Champions: Cignal HD Spikers (2nd title)
- Runners-up: D' Navigators Iloilo
- Third place: Benilde Blazers
- Fourth place: VNS Asereht Griffins

Tournament awards
- MVP: Joshua Umandal (Cignal)
- Best Setter: EJ Casaña (Cignal)
- Best OH: Joshua Umandal (Cignal); Barbie San Andres (D'Navigators)
- Best MB: Jayvee Sumagaysay (D'Navigators); John Paul Bugaoan (Cignal)
- Best OPP: Kevin Montemayor (VNS)
- Best Libero: Bryle Gomez (Benilde)

Tournament statistics
- Matches played: 20

The men's division of the 2024 PNVF Champions League began on February 11 to 17, 2024, at the Rizal Memorial Coliseum, Manila, Philippines. This is the fourth edition of the PNVF tournament and its third edition as the PNVF Champions League.

A total of eight teams competed for the championship title and divided into two pools.

Cignal HD Spikers won their second title of tournament.

== Participating teams ==
Club	Affiliation	Coach	Captain
Benilde Blazers	De La Salle–College of Saint Benilde	Arnold Laniog	Bryle Gomez
Cignal HD Spikers	Cignal TV	Dexter Clamor	John Paul Bugaoan
D'Navigators Iloilo	Iloilo City	Boyet Delmoro	John Michael Apolinario
PGJC Philippine Navy	Philippine Navy	Cecille Cruzada	Marvin Hairami
Philippine Air Force Air Spikers	Philippine Air Force	Jhimson Merza	Rodolfo Labrador Jr.
Philippine Army Troopers	Philippine Army	Melvin Carolino	Benjaylo Labide
Savouge Spin Doctors	Savouge Aesthetics Philippines	Sabtbl Abdul	Jhon Lorenz Señoron
VNS Asereht Griffins	VNS Management Group	Ralph Raymond Ocampo	Ron Medalla

== Pools composition ==
Pool A	Pool B
Benilde Blazers	D' Navigators Iloilo
Cignal HD Spikers	Philippine Air Force Air Spikers
PGJC Philippine Navy	Philippine Army Troopers
Savouge Spin Doctors	VNS Asereht Griffins

== Format ==
The following format will be conducted for the entirety of the conference:

Preliminary Round

1. Single-round robin preliminaries; 8 teams; 2 pools; Teams are ranked using the FIVB Ranking System.
2. The top two teams in each pool will qualified for the final round

Semifinal (knockout stage)

1. SF1: A1 winner vs. B2 winner
2. SF2: B1 winner vs. A2 winner

Finals (knockout stage)

1. Bronze medal: SF1 Loser vs SF2 Loser
2. Gold medal: SF1 Winner vs SF2 Winner

== Pool standing procedure ==
- First, teams are ranked by the number of matches won.
- If the number of matches won is tied, the tied teams are then ranked by match points, wherein:
  - Match won 3–0 or 3–1: 3 match points for the winner, 0 match points for the loser.
  - Match won 3–2: 2 match points for the winner, 1 match point for the loser.
- In case of any further ties, the following criteria shall be used:
1. Set ratio: number of sets won divided by number of sets lost.
2. Setpoint ratio: number of points scored divided by number of points allowed.
3. Head-to-head standings: any remaining tied teams are ranked based on the results of head-to-head matches involving the teams in question.

== Venue ==
All matches
Manila
Rizal Memorial Coliseum
Capacity: 10,000
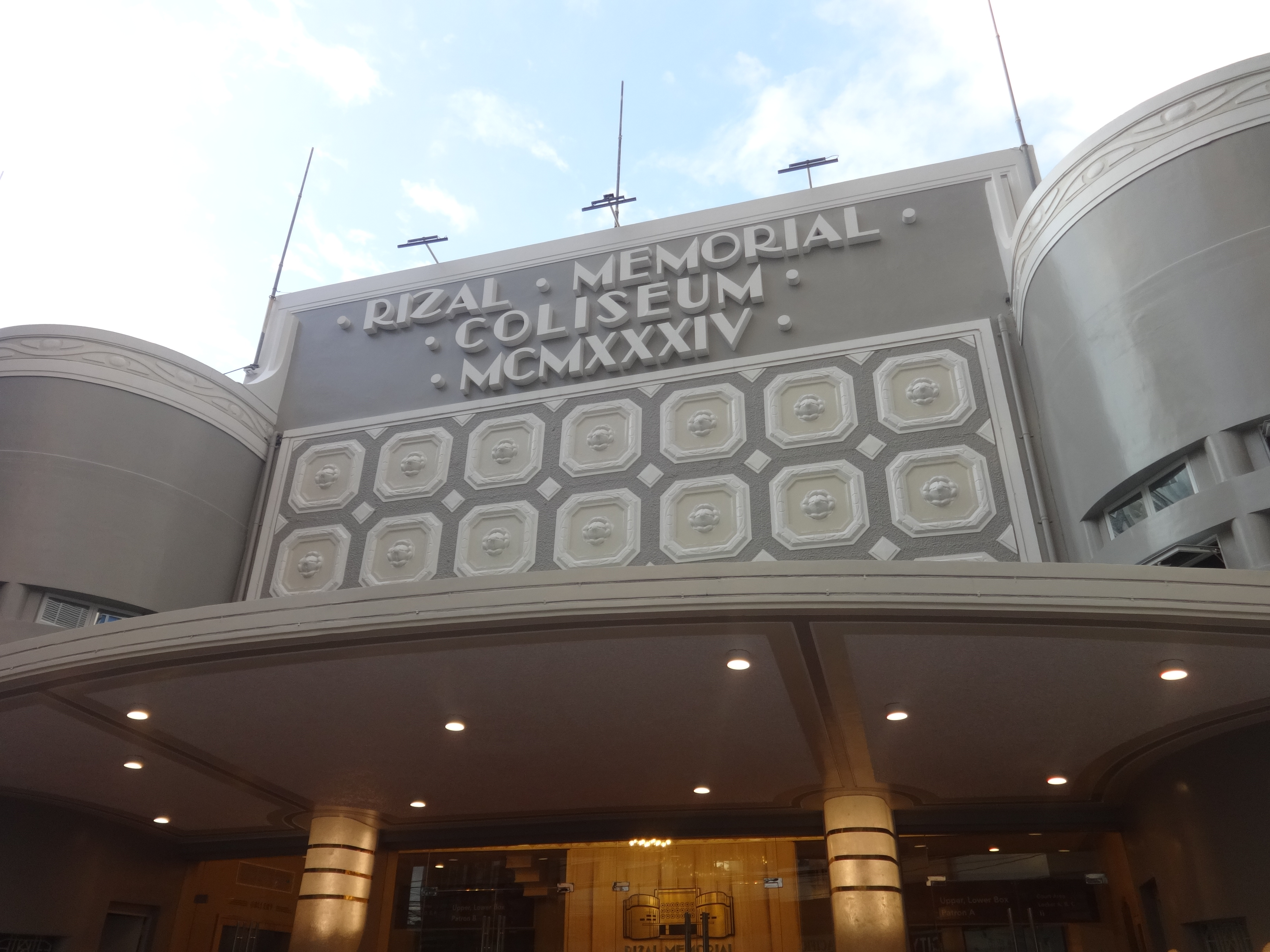

== Preliminary round ==
=== Pool A ===
Pos	Team	Pld	W	L	Pts	SW	SL	SR	SPW	SPL	SPR	Qualification
1	Cignal HD Spikers	3	3	0	9	9	0	MAX	227	174	1.305	Final round
2	Benilde Blazers	3	2	1	6	6	4	1.500	225	234	0.962	Final round
3	Savouge Spin Doctors	3	1	2	3	3	7	0.429	209	240	0.871	Classification round
4	PGJC Philippine Navy	3	0	3	0	2	9	0.222	244	257	0.949	Classification round

Date	Time		Score		Set 1	Set 2	Set 3	Set 4	Set 5	Total	Report
11 Feb	13:00	Cignal HD Spikers	3–0	Benilde Blazers	25–19	25–21	25–20			75–60	
11 Feb	15:30	Savouge Spin Doctors	3–1	PGJC Philippine Navy	25–21	15–25	25–22	25–22		90–90	
12 Feb	13:00	Benilde Blazers	3–0	Savouge Spin Doctors	25–20	25–23	25–23			75–66	
13 Feb	13:00	PGJC Philippine Navy	0–3	Cignal HD Spikers	15–25	21–25	25–27			61–77	
14 Feb	15:30	Cignal HD Spikers	3–0	Savouge Spin Doctors	25–15	25–16	25–22			75–53	
14 Feb	18:00	Benilde Blazers	3–1	PGJC Philippine Navy	26–24	25–22	14–25	25–22		90–93	

=== Pool B ===
Pos	Team	Pld	W	L	Pts	SW	SL	SR	SPW	SPL	SPR	Qualification
1	D' Navigators Iloilo	3	3	0	9	9	0	MAX	225	184	1.223	Final round
2	VNS Asereht Griffins	3	2	1	6	6	5	1.200	263	265	0.992	Final round
3	Philippine Army Troopers	3	1	2	3	4	7	0.571	246	238	1.034	Classification round
4	Philippine Air Force Air Spikers	3	0	3	0	2	9	0.222	231	278	0.831	Classification round

Date	Time		Score		Set 1	Set 2	Set 3	Set 4	Set 5	Total	Report
11 Feb	18:00	VNS Asereht Griffins	0–3	D' Navigators Iloilo	20–25	23–25	20–25			63–75	
12 Feb	15:30	D' Navigators Iloilo	3–0	Philippine Air Force Air Spikers	25–18	25–21	25–23			75–62	
12 Feb	18:00	Philippine Army Troopers	1–3	VNS Asereht Griffins	23–25	25–16	22–25	23–25		93–91	
13 Feb	15:30	Philippine Air Force Air Spikers	1–3	VNS Asereht Griffins	17–25	30–28	21–25	29–31		97–109	
13 Feb	18:00	D' Navigators Iloilo	3–0	Philippine Army Troopers	25–18	25–22	25–19			75–59	
14 Feb	13:00	Philippine Army Troopers	3–1	Philippine Air Force Air Spikers	25–19	25–14	19–25	25–14		94–72	

== Classification round ==
- All times are Philippine Standard Time (UTC+8:00).
- All are (knockout stage).

5th–8th semifinals
February 15
Savouge Spin Doctors	3
Philippine Air Force Air Spikers	0
February 15
Philippine Army Troopers	3
PGJC Philippine Navy	0

5th place match
February 16
Savouge Spin Doctors	3
Philippine Army Troopers	0
7th place match
February 16
Philippine Air Force Air Spikers	1
PGJC Philippine Navy	3

=== 5th–8th places ===
Date	Time		Score		Set 1	Set 2	Set 3	Set 4	Set 5	Total	Report
15 Feb	12:00	Savouge Spin Doctors	3–0	Philippine Air Force Air Spikers	25–18	25–18	25–18			75–54	
15 Feb	14:30	Philippine Army Troopers	3–0	PGJC Philippine Navy	25–23	25–17	25–17			75–57	

=== 7th place match ===
Date	Time		Score		Set 1	Set 2	Set 3	Set 4	Set 5	Total	Report
16 Feb	15:00	Philippine Air Force Air Spikers	1–3	PGJC Philippine Navy	18–25	19–25	25–23	19–25		81–98	

=== 5th place match ===
Date	Time		Score		Set 1	Set 2	Set 3	Set 4	Set 5	Total	Report
16 Feb	17:30	Savouge Spin Doctors	3–0	Philippine Army Troopers	25–16	25–23	25–21			75–60	

== Final round ==
- All times are Philippine Standard Time (UTC+8:00).
- All are knockout stage.

Semifinals
February 15
Cignal HD Spikers	3
VNS Asereht Griffins	0
February 15
D' Navigators Iloilo	3
Benilde Blazers	0

Championship match
February 17
Cignal HD Spikers	3
D' Navigators Iloilo	1
3rd place match
February 17
VNS Asereht Griffins	0
Benilde Blazers	3

=== Semifinals ===
Date	Time		Score		Set 1	Set 2	Set 3	Set 4	Set 5	Total	Report
15 Feb	17:00	Cignal HD Spikers	3–0	VNS Asereht Griffins	25–14	25–15	25–22			75–51	
15 Feb	19:30	D' Navigators Iloilo	3–0	Benilde Blazers	25–21	25–16	25–19			75–56	

=== Finals ===
==== 3rd place match ====
Date	Time		Score		Set 1	Set 2	Set 3	Set 4	Set 5	Total	Report
17 Feb	15:00	VNS Asereht Griffins	0–3	Benilde Blazers	18–25	22–25	24–26			64–76	

==== Championship match ====
Date	Time		Score		Set 1	Set 2	Set 3	Set 4	Set 5	Total	Report
17 Feb	17:30	Cignal HD Spikers	3–1	D' Navigators Iloilo	27–25	31–33	25–16	25–18		108–92	

== Final standing ==
Rank	Team
1st place, gold medalist(s)	Cignal HD Spikers
2nd place, silver medalist(s)	D' Navigators Iloilo
3rd place, bronze medalist(s)	Benilde Blazers
4	VNS Asereht Griffins
5	Savouge Spin Doctors
6	Philippine Army Troopers
7	PGJC Philippine Navy
8	Philippine Air Force Air Spikers

2024 PNVF Champions League for Men Champions

2nd title

== Awards and medalists ==
=== Individual awards ===
Award	Player	Team	Ref.
Most Valuable Player	Joshua Umandal	Cignal	
1st Best Outside Spiker	Joshua Umandal	Cignal	
2nd Best Outside Spiker	Barbie San Andres	D'Navigators	
1st Best Middle Blocker	Jayvee Sumagaysay	D'Navigators	
2nd Best Middle Blocker	John Paul Bugaoan	Cignal	
Best Opposite Spiker	Kevin Montemayor	VNS	
Best Setter	EJ Casaña	Cignal	
Best Libero	Bryle Gomez	Benilde	

== See also ==
- 2024 PNVF Champions League for Women
