= Jade Disquitado =

Filipino volleyball player

Personal information
- Full name: Jade Alex Disquitado
- Nationality: Filipino
- Born: May 18, 2004 (age 22); Malolos, Bulacan, Philippines
- Height: 181 cm (5 ft 11 in)
- Weight: 80 kg (176 lb)
- Education: National University

Career
Years	Teams
2022–2023	NU–Sta. Elena
2023	D'Navigators Iloilo

National team
2023–present	Philippines

Jade Alex Disquitado is a Filipino volleyball player who plays for the NU Bulldogs in the University Athletic Association of the Philippines (UAAP) and the Philippine national team.

== Early life ==
Jade Alex Disquitado was born on May 18, 2004, in Malolos, Bulacan.

== Career ==
=== Santa Rosa and Iloilo ===
Disquitado was part of the Santa Rosa City Lions which played in the 2022 Spikers' Turf Open Conference. The team lost to the National University(NU)-backed Sta. Elena in the final.

In the 2023 Open Conference, Disquitado was part of the D' Navigators Iloilo which finished as semifinalists. He was named Best Outside Spiker.

He returned to NU–Sta. Elena for the 2023 Invitational Conference also winning the tournament and was named Finals MVP.

=== NU Bulldogs ===
Disquitado was scouted by Dante Alinsunurin of the NU Bulldogs during his stint with Santa Rosa in 2022. He committed to join NU in 2023. He was a starter for NU in the University Athletic Association of the Philippines (UAAP) Season 86.

=== National team ===
Disquitado has played for the Philippine national volleyball team. He was part of the squad which played at the 2023 SEA Games in Cambodia. He was the youngest player in the roster at age 18. He also played at the 2025 FIVB Men's Volleyball World Championship.
