= 2023 PNVF Challenge Cup – Men's Division =

Filipino volleyball tournament

2023 PNVF Challenge Cup Men's Division
Tournament details
- Dates: November 7–25, 2023
- Teams: 20
- Venue: Rizal Memorial Coliseum

Final positions
- Champions: University of Santo Tomas (1st title)
- Runners-up: Cignal HD Spikers
- Third place: VNS Asereht
- Fourth place: National University

Tournament awards
- MVP: Joshua Ybañez (UST)
- Best Setter: Jerome Lopez (VNS)
- Best OH: Joshua Ybañez (UST); Rey Miguel De Vega (UST)
- Best MB: John Paul Bugaoan (Cignal); Edlyn Paul Colinares (UST)
- Best OPP: Sherwin Umandal (UST)
- Best Libero: Manuel Sumanguid III (Cignal)

Tournament statistics
- Matches played: 48

The men's division of the 2023 PNVF Challenge Cup began on November 7, 2023.

Starting from this season, the tournament formerly known as the PNVF Champions League would be known as the PNVF Challenge Cup. This marks as the third season of the league.

University of Santo Tomas were the champions.

== Participating teams ==
The tournament was originally meant to enable local government units (cities, municipalities, and provinces) to hold their own volleyball programs. The Challenge Cup would be opened for school and club teams. By the end of October 2023, the PNVF has secured commitment from 20 men's teams.

Club/Team	Sponsor	Locality
Arellano University	—N/a	Manila
Cignal HD Spikers	Cignal TV, Inc.	—N/a
Kuya JM Davao City	Kuya JM	Davao City
D'Navigators Iloilo	—N/a	Iloilo City
Emilio Aguinaldo College	—N/a	Manila
José Rizal University	—N/a	Mandaluyong
3B Marikina	—N/a	Marikina
National University	—N/a	Manila
Angatleta–Orion	Angatleta Sports	Orion, Bataan
Plaridel, Quezon	—N/a	Plaridel, Quezon
PGJC–Navy	Philippine Navy	—N/a
Rizal Technological University–Basilan	—N/a	Basilan
Santa Rosa City	—N/a	Santa Rosa, Laguna
Savouge RTU–Basilan	Savouge Medical Aesthetics Clinic	Basilan
Tacloban–Eastern Visayas Fighting Warays	—N/a	Tacloban
University of Batangas	—N/a	Batangas City
University of the East–Cherrylume	Mileage Asia Corporation	Manila
University of Santo Tomas	—N/a	Manila
VNS Asereht	—N/a	—N/a
Volida Volleyball Club	—N/a	Manila

== Format ==
The following format will be conducted for the entirety of the conference:

Preliminary Round

1. Single-round robin preliminaries; 20 teams; 4 pools; Teams are ranked using the FIVB Ranking System.
2. The top two teams in each pool will qualified for the final round

Quarterfinal (knockout stage)

1. QF1: #A1 vs. #D2
2. QF3: #C1 vs. #B2
3. QF2: #B1 vs. #C2
4. QF4: #D1 vs. #A2

Semifinal (knockout stage)

1. SF1: QF1 winner vs. QF3 winner
2. SF2: QF2 winner vs. QF4 winner

Finals (knockout stage)

1. Bronze medal: SF1 Loser vs SF2 Loser
2. Gold medal: SF1 Winner vs SF2 Winner

== Pools composition ==
The 20 teams were divided into four pools.

Pool A	Pool B	Pool C	Pool D
Cignal HD Spikers	National University	PGJC–Navy	University of Santo Tomas
Kuya JM–Davao City	Savouge RTU–Basilan	3B Marikina City	Tacloban Fighting Warays
Savouge Aesthetics	Arellano University	Angatleta–Orion	D'Navigators Iloilo
Volida Volleyball Club	VNS Asereht	Jose Rizal University	Santa Rosa City
University of Batangas	University of the East-Cherrylume	Plaridel, Quezon	Emilio Aguinaldo College

== Venue ==
All matches
Manila
Rizal Memorial Coliseum
Capacity: 10,000
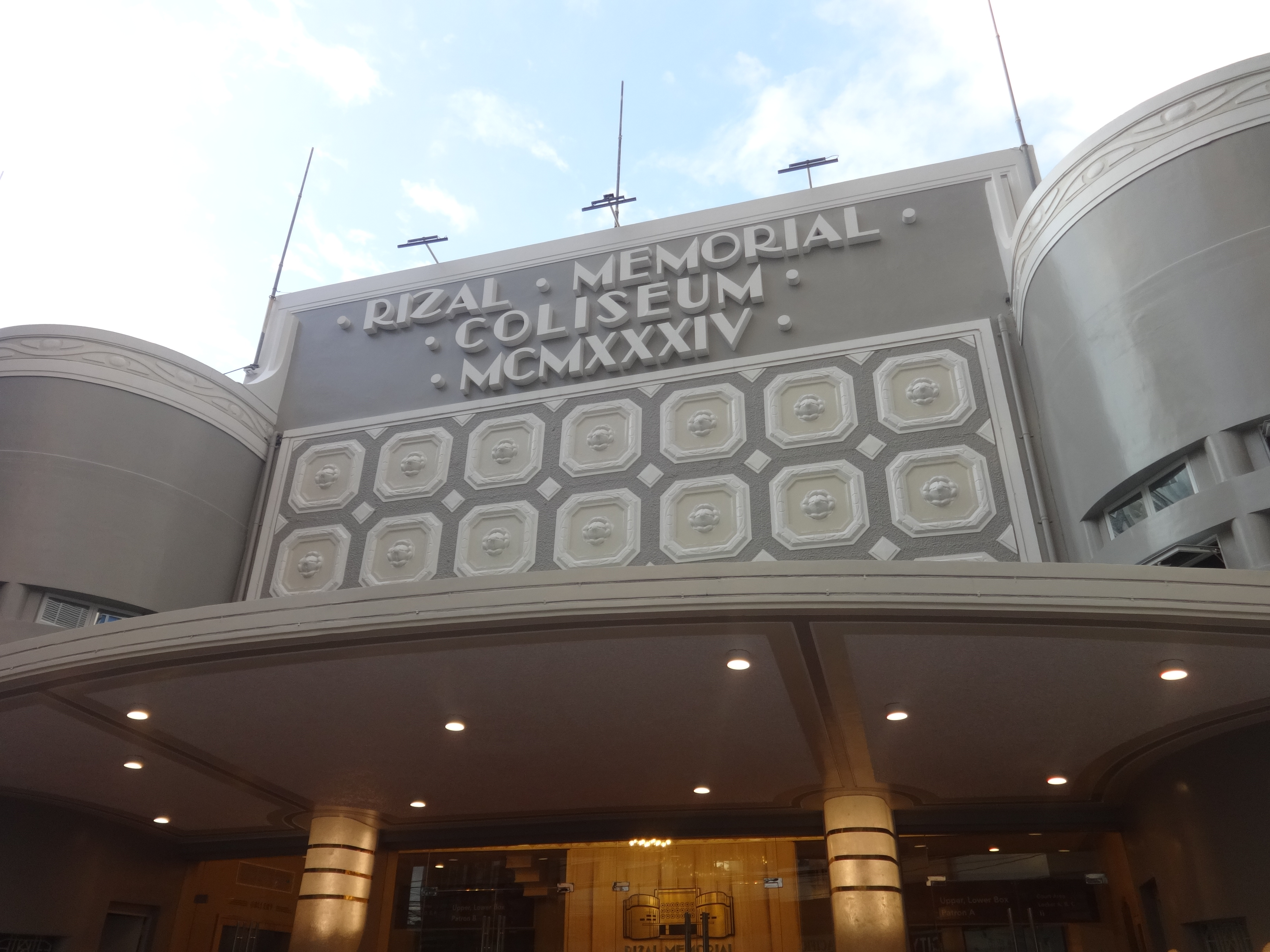

== Preliminary round ==
- All times are Philippine Standard Time (UTC+8:00).

=== Pool A ===
Pos	Team	Pld	W	L	Pts	SW	SL	SR	SPW	SPL	SPR	Qualification
1	Cignal HD Spikers	4	4	0	12	12	0	MAX	300	178	1.685	Quarterfinals
2	Savouge Aesthetics	4	2	2	6	7	6	1.167	232	213	1.089	Quarterfinals
3	Kuya JM–Davao City	4	2	2	6	6	6	1.000	197	180	1.094	
4	University of Batangas	4	2	2	6	6	7	0.857	275	285	0.965	
5	Volida Volleyball Club	4	0	4	0	0	12	0.000	152	300	0.507	

Date	Time	Venue		Score		Set 1	Set 2	Set 3	Set 4	Set 5	Total	Report
07 Nov	14:00	RMC	Cignal HD Spikers	3–0	Savouge Aesthetics	25–21	25–16	25–22			75–59	
09 Nov	12:00	RMC	Volida Volleyball Club	0–3	University of Batangas	14–25	12–25	11–25			37–75	
14 Nov	12:00	RMC	University of Batangas	0–3	Cignal HD Spikers	15–25	14–25	16–25			45–75	
14 Nov	14:00	RMC	Kuya JM–Davao City	3–0	Volida Volleyball Club	25–19	25–19	25–11			75–49	
15 Nov	08:00	RMC	Volida Volleyball Club	0–3	Savouge Aesthetics	11–25	11–25	17–25			39–75	
15 Nov	14:00	RMC	Cignal HD Spikers	3–0	Kuya JM–Davao City	25–19	25–17	25–11			75–47	
17 Nov	18:00	RMC	Savouge Aesthetics	3–0	Kuya JM–Davao City	25–17	25–19	25–20			75–56	
18 Nov	12:00	RMC	Volida Volleyball Club	0–3	Cignal HD Spikers	12–25	7–25	8–25			27–75	
19 Nov	18:00	RMC	Kuya JM–Davao City	3–0	University of Batangas	25–20	25–19	25–17			75–56	
20 Nov	15:00	RMC	University of Batangas	3–1	Savouge Aesthetics	25–22	30–28	19–25	25–23		99–98	

=== Pool B ===
Pos	Team	Pld	W	L	Pts	SW	SL	SR	SPW	SPL	SPR	Qualification
1	National University	4	4	0	11	12	2	6.000	337	263	1.281	Quarterfinals
2	VNS Asereht	4	3	1	10	11	4	2.750	271	257	1.054	Quarterfinals
3	University of the East–Cherrylume	4	2	2	6	7	7	1.000	321	310	1.035	
4	RTU-Basilan	4	1	3	2	3	11	0.273	271	325	0.834	
5	Arellano University	4	0	4	1	3	12	0.250	280	353	0.793	

Date	Time	Venue		Score		Set 1	Set 2	Set 3	Set 4	Set 5	Total	Report
07 Nov	16:00	RMC	National University	3–0	RTU-Basilan	25–15	25–17	25–19			75–51	
08 Nov	12:00	RMC	University of the East–Cherrylume	3–1	Arellano University	25–18	22–25	25–22	25–23		97–88	
09 Nov	14:00	RMC	VNS Asereht	3–1	University of the East–Cherrylume	25–18	19–25	25–21	25–20		94–84	
14 Nov	10:00	RMC	VNS Asereht	3–0	RTU-Basilan	25–23	25–15	25–23			75–61	
16 Nov	18:00	RMC	National University	3–2	VNS Asereht	25–23	22–25	25–21	25–27	15–6	112–102	
18 Nov	14:00	RMC	University of the East–Cherrylume	0–3	National University	22–25	23–25	20–25			65–75	
18 Nov	16:00	RMC	Arellano University	0–3	VNS Asereht	11–25	19–25	17–25			47–75	
20 Nov	09:00	RMC	RTU-Basilan	0–3	University of the East–Cherrylume	18–25	16–25	19–25			53–75	
20 Nov	11:00	RMC	National University	3–0	Arellano University	25–17	25–12	25–16			75–45	
21 Nov	13:00	RMC	Arellano University	2–3	RTU-Basilan	25–19	25–22	22–25	18–25	10–15	100–106	

=== Pool C ===
Pos	Team	Pld	W	L	Pts	SW	SL	SR	SPW	SPL	SPR	Qualification
1	PGJC–Navy	4	4	0	12	12	1	12.000	322	184	1.750	Quarterfinals
2	Jose Rizal University	4	3	1	9	10	3	3.333	300	236	1.271	Quarterfinals
3	3B Marikina City	4	2	2	6	6	6	1.000	248	252	0.984	
4	Plaridel, Quezon	4	1	3	3	3	9	0.333	242	268	0.903	
5	Angatleta–Orion	4	0	4	0	0	12	0.000	127	300	0.423	

Date	Time	Venue		Score		Set 1	Set 2	Set 3	Set 4	Set 5	Total	Report
08 Nov	08:00	RMC	Angatleta–Orion	0–3	Jose Rizal University	11–25	15–25	12–25			38–75	
08 Nov	10:00	RMC	PGJC–Navy	3–0	Plaridel, Quezon	25–18	25–23	25–20			75–61	
09 Nov	18:00	RMC	Plaridel, Quezon	3–0	Angatleta–Orion	25–18	25–10	25–14			75–42	
14 Nov	08:00	RMC	3B Marikina City	0–3	PGJC–Navy	20–25	11–25	18–25			49–75	
15 Nov	10:00	RMC	Jose Rizal University	3–0	3B Marikina City	25–13	25–17	25–19			75–49	
15 Nov	12:00	RMC	PGJC–Navy	3–0	Angatleta–Orion	25–0	25–0	25–0			75–0	
16 Nov	16:00	RMC	3B Marikina City	3–0	Plaridel, Quezon	25–20	25–14	25–21			75–55	
17 Nov	16:00	RMC	Angatleta–Orion	0–3	3B Marikina City	11–25	15–25	21–25			47–75	
19 Nov	14:00	RMC	Jose Rizal University	1–3	PGJC–Navy	24–26	16–25	25–22	9–25		74–98	
20 Nov	13:00	RMC	Plaridel, Quezon	0–3	Jose Rizal University	13–25	14–25	24–26			51–76	

=== Pool D ===
Pos	Team	Pld	W	L	Pts	SW	SL	SR	SPW	SPL	SPR	Qualification
1	University of Santo Tomas	4	4	0	12	12	1	12.000	320	247	1.296	Quarterfinals
2	D'Navigators Iloilo	4	3	1	9	9	3	3.000	293	246	1.191	Quarterfinals
3	Emilio Aguinaldo College	4	2	2	6	6	7	0.857	295	273	1.081	
4	Santa Rosa City	4	1	3	3	4	10	0.400	273	335	0.815	
5	Tacloban Fighting Warays	4	0	4	0	2	12	0.167	260	338	0.769	

Date	Time	Venue		Score		Set 1	Set 2	Set 3	Set 4	Set 5	Total	Report
07 Nov	18:00	RMC	University of Santo Tomas	3–0	Santa Rosa City	25–14	25–20	25–17			75–51	
08 Nov	14:00	RMC	Santa Rosa City	1–3	Emilio Aguinaldo College	16–25	20–25	25–23	15–25		76–98	
09 Nov	16:00	RMC	Emilio Aguinaldo College	0–3	University of Santo Tomas	20–25	17–25	18–25			55–75	
16 Nov	14:00	RMC	D'Navigators Iloilo	3–0	Emilio Aguinaldo College	27–25	25–22	25–20			77–67	
17 Nov	14:00	RMC	Tacloban Fighting Warays	0–3	D'Navigators Iloilo	18–25	17–25	16–25			51–75	
18 Nov	18:00	RMC	D'Navigators Iloilo	0–3	University of Santo Tomas	23–25	23–25	20–25			66–75	
19 Nov	16:00	RMC	Santa Rosa City	3–1	Tacloban Fighting Warays	25–23	18–25	25–20	25–21		93–89	
20 Nov	17:00	RMC	Tacloban Fighting Warays	0–3	Emilio Aguinaldo College	17–25	17–25	11–25			45–75	
21 Nov	15:00	RMC	D'Navigators Iloilo	3–0	Santa Rosa City	25–17	25–14	25–22			75–53	
21 Nov	17:00	RMC	University of Santo Tomas	3–1	Tacloban Fighting Warays	25–19	25–19	20–25	25–12		95–75	

== Final round ==
- All times are Philippine Standard Time (UTC+8:00).

Quarterfinals
November 23
A1	Cignal HD Spikers	3
D2	D'Navigators Iloilo	0
November 23
C1	PGJC–Navy	0
B2	VNS Asereht	3
November 23
B1	National University	3
C2	Jose Rizal University	0
November 23
D1	University of Santo Tomas	3
A2	Savouge Aesthetics	0

Semifinals
November 24
Cignal HD Spikers	3
VNS Asereht	2
November 24
National University	1
University of Santo Tomas	3

Championship
November 25
Cignal HD Spikers	2
University of Santo Tomas	3
Third place
November 25
VNS Asereht	3
National University	2

=== Quarterfinals ===
Date	Time		Score		Set 1	Set 2	Set 3	Set 4	Set 5	Total	Report
23 Nov	10:00	Cignal HD Spikers	3–0	D'Navigators Iloilo	25–18	25–23	25–17			75–58	
23 Nov	12:30	PGJC–Navy	0–3	VNS Asereht	24–26	24–26	24–26			72–78	
23 Nov	15:00	National University	3–0	Jose Rizal University	26–24	25–19	25–18			76–61	
23 Nov	17:30	University of Santo Tomas	3–0	Savouge Aesthetics	25–19	25–20	25–20			75–59	

=== Semifinals ===
Date	Time		Score		Set 1	Set 2	Set 3	Set 4	Set 5	Total	Report
24 Nov	15:00	Cignal HD Spikers	3–2	VNS Asereht	25–21	25–22	21–15	23–25	15–10	109–93	
24 Nov	17:30	National University	1–3	University of Santo Tomas	18–25	22–25	25–20	24–26		89–96	

=== Finals ===
==== Bronze Medal Match ====
Date	Time		Score		Set 1	Set 2	Set 3	Set 4	Set 5	Total	Report
25 Nov	10:00	VNS Asereht	3–2	National University	32–34	23–25	26–24	25–23	15–13	121–119	

==== Gold Medal Match ====
Date	Time		Score		Set 1	Set 2	Set 3	Set 4	Set 5	Total	Report
25 Nov	17:30	Cignal HD Spikers	2–3	University of Santo Tomas	25–20	22–25	22–25	25–19	13–15	107–104	

== Final standing ==
Rank	Team
1st place, gold medalist(s)	University of Santo Tomas
2nd place, silver medalist(s)	Cignal HD Spikers
3rd place, bronze medalist(s)	VNS Asereht
4	National University
5	PGJC–Navy
6	Jose Rizal University
7	D'Navigators Iloilo
8	Savouge Aesthetics
9	University of the East–Cherrylume
10	Kuya JM–Davao City
11	3B Marikina City
12	Emilio Aguinaldo College
13	University of Batangas
14	Santa Rosa City
15	Plaridel, Quezon
16	RTU–Basilan
17	Arellano University
18	Tacloban Fighting Warays
19	Volida Volleyball Club
20	Angatleta–Orion

2023 PNVF Challenge Cup Men's Champions
University of Santo Tomas
1st title

== Awards ==
=== Individual awards ===
Award	Player	Team	Ref.
Most Valuable Player	Joshua Ybañez	UST	
1st Best Outside Spiker	Joshua Ybañez	UST	
2nd Best Outside Spiker	Rey Miguel De Vega	UST	
1st Best Middle Blocker	John Paul Bugaoan	Cignal	
2nd Best Middle Blocker	Edlyn Paul Colinares	UST	
Best Opposite Spiker	Sherwin Umandal	UST	
Best Setter	Jerome Lopez	VNS	
Best Libero	Manuel Sumanguid III	Cignal	

== See also ==
- 2023 PNVF Challenge Cup – Women's Division
