= Sammy Acaylar =

Filipino volleyball coach (1958–2025)

Personal information
- Nationality: Filipino
- Born: February 4, 1958
- Died: January 30, 2025 (aged 66) Las Piñas, Metro Manila, Philippines
- Home town: Cagayan de Oro

Coaching information
- Previous teams coached
- Years: Teams
- 1985–2024; 2013–2016; 2017; 2018; 2023; 2023; 2024: Perpetual Altas; Cignal HD Spikers (women); Sta. Lucia Lady Realtors; UE Red Warriors; Imus City–AJAA Spikers; Quezon City Gerflor Defenders; Savouge Spin Doctors

Volleyball information

National team
- Years: Team
- 1991, 2009, 2017: Philippines
Honours
Men's volleyball
Head coach for Philippines
Southeast Asian Games
Bronze medal – third place	1991 Manila	National Team

Sinfronio "Sammy" Acaylar (February 4, 1958 – January 30, 2025) was a Filipino volleyball coach.

== Career ==
=== Club ===
Acaylar coached the Cignal HD Spikers women's team of the Philippine Super Liga, helping them finish as runners-up twice in their first season in 2013.

He joined the Sta. Lucia Lady Realtors, who were newcomers in the 2017 season. He guided the team in the All-Filipino Conference before resigning shortly prior to the start of the Grand Prix Conference due to commitments with other teams.

He briefly went to coach the Imus City–AJAA Spikers in their 2023 season Spikers' Turf run.

In August 2023, Acaylar returned to women's volleyball and joined the Premier Volleyball League side Quezon City Gerflor Defenders in the lead up to the 2023 PVL Second All-Filipino Conference He did not win any of the 11 matches of the team which faced salary issues.

After Gerflor's disbandment, Acaylar went on to coach men's side Savouge Aesthetics in the Spikers' Turf.

=== Collegiate ===
Acaylar was known for his role in the University of Perpetual Help System DALTA Altas of the National Collegiate Athletic Association (NCAA) which he has been working for since 1985. From 2010 to 2014, he accomplish a win streak for the Altas men's team – which was then the longest in Philippine sport in general. He return full time with Perpetual in 2018 after assuming multiple simultaneous coaching roles with other teams. He was also offered to become Perpetual's sports director in 2017. He won the 2018, 2019, 2023, and 2024 titles as well garnering 14 men's volleyball titles for Perpetual.

Acaylay also coached the Perpetual Lady Altas from Season 88 to 90.

He also coached in the University Athletic Association of the Philippines (UAAP). The De La Salle Green Spikers from Seasons 71 to 73; The University of the East (UE) Red Warriors for their Season 80 run in 2018.

=== National team ===
Acaylar coached the Philippines men's national team in multiple occasions. He coached the team which finished as bronze medalists at the 1991 Southeast Asian Games. He also led a team at the 2009 Asian Men's Volleyball Championship where they ended winless in six games.

Acaylar was again tasked to lead the team in the 2017 Southeast Asian Games where they finished sixth.

He was also part of the Stanislav Lugailo-led coaching staff of the Philippines women's national team which won gold at the 1993 Southeast Asian Games.

== Illness and death ==
After suffering a stroke, Acaylar was brought to the University of Perpetual Help Medical Center in Las Piñas, on January 7, 2025. He died from a cardiac arrest on January 30.
