= Cignal HD Spikers (men) =

Men's volleyball team in the Philippines

- Full name: Cignal HD Spikers (2014–2025); Cignal Super Spikers (2025–2026)
- Short name: Cignal
- Nickname: Spikers
- Founded: 2014
- Dissolved: 2026
- League: Philippine Super Liga (2014); Spikers' Turf (2015–2026)
- Championships: 10; PSL: 1; 2014 Grand Prix; Spikers' Turf / PVL men's: 9 List: 2015 Reinforced 2017 Reinforced 2017 Open 2019 Reinforced 2019 Open 2023 Open 2024 Open 2024 Invitational 2025 Open

Uniforms
Home	Away

The Cignal HD Spikers were a professional men's volleyball team in the Philippines. The club is owned by Cignal TV, Inc., a subsidiary of MediaQuest Holdings, Inc., a PLDT company.

It started in the Philippine Super Liga in 2014 before moving to the Spikers' Turf in 2015.

It was dissolved in January 2026, after playing as the Cignal Super Spikers at the 2025 Invitational Conference

== History ==
=== Philippine Super Liga ===
The Cignal Super Spikers started as the Cignal HD Spikers in the Philippine Super Liga (PSL). They debuted at the 2014 PSL All-Filipino Conference where they finished as runners-up.

They won their first PSL title in the succeeding tournament, the 2014 Grand Prix Conference. This qualified Cignal for the 2015 Asian Men's Club Volleyball Championship in Taiwan.

As of 2026, Cignal is currently under a leave of absence from the league.

=== Spikers' Turf ===
Cignal moved to the then newly-established Spikers' Turf in 2015. The league is the men's counterpart of the Shakey's V-League. Cignal went on to become a nine-time Spikers' Turf champion.

Formerly known as the Cignal HD Spikers, the team adopted its current name in October 2025. Cignal missed its first ever PVL finals since 2019 at the 2025 Invitational Conference where the team finished as third placers. In January 2026, Cignal filed a leave of absence from the league ahead of the 2026 Open Conference.

== Honors ==
=== Team ===
Spikers' Turf/Premier Volleyball League:

Year	Conference	Title	Source
2015	Open	4th place	
2015	Reinforced	Champions	
2016	Open	Runners-up	
2016	Reinforced	Runners-up	
2017	Reinforced (Note: Premier Volleyball League)	Champions	
2017	Open	Champions	
2018	Reinforced	Runners-up	
2018	Open	3rd place	
2019	Reinforced	Champions	
2019	Open	Champions	
2022	Open	Runners-up	
2023	Open	Champions	
2023	Invitational	Runners-up	
2024	Open	Champions	
2024	Invitational	Champions	
2025	Open	Champions	
2025	Invitational	3rd place	

Philippine Superliga:

Season	Conference	Title	Source
2014	All-Filipino	Runner-up	
2014	Grand Prix	Champion	

Others:

Year	Tournament	Title	Source
2015	AVC Club Volleyball Championship	12th place	
2022	PNVF Champions League	Champion	
2023	PNVF Challenge Cup	Runners-up	
2024	PNVF Champions League	Champion	

=== Individual ===
Spikers' Turf:

Season	Conference	Award	Name	Source
2015	Open	1st Best Middle Blocker	Rayson Fuentes	
2015	Reinforced	Best Setter	Glacy Ralph Diezmo	
2015	Reinforced	Best Libero	Sandy Montero	
2015	Reinforced	Most Valuable Player (Finals)	Edward Ybañez	
2016	Open	1st Best Outside Spiker	Raymark Woo	
2016	Open	2nd Best Middle Blocker	Herschel Ramos	
2016	Reinforced	2nd Best Outside Spiker	Lorenzo Capate Jr.	
2016	Reinforced	2nd Best Middle Blocker	Peter Den Mar Torres	
2016	Reinforced	Best Libero	Sandy Montero	
2018	Open	1st Best Middle Blocker	Peter Den Mar Torres	
2018	Open	Best Opposite Spiker	Ysay Marasigan	
2019	Reinforced	Most Valuable Player (Finals)	Marck Espejo	
2019	Reinforced	2nd Best Outside Spiker	Marck Espejo	
2019	Reinforced	Best Setter	Vince Mangulabnan	
2019	Reinforced	Best Libero	Manuel Sumanguid III	
2019	Open	Most Valuable Player (Finals)	Marck Espejo	
2019	Open	2nd Best Outside Spiker	Marck Espejo	
2019	Open	Most Valuable Player (Conference)	Ysay Marasigan	
2019	Open	2nd Best Middle Blocker	Anjo Pertierra	
2022	Open	1st Best Outside Spiker	Marck Espejo	
2022	Open	Best Opposite Spiker	Ysay Marasigan	
2022	Open	Best Libero	Manuel Sumanguid III	
2022	Open	2nd Best Middle Blocker	John Paul Bugaoan	
2023	Open	Most Valuable Player (Finals)	Marck Espejo	
2023	Open	2nd Best Outside Spiker	Wendel Miguel	
2023	Open	1st Best Middle Blocker	John Paul Bugaoan	
2023	Open	Best Opposite Spiker	Ysay Marasigan	
2023	Open	Best Libero	Manuel Sumanguid III	
2023	Invitational	1st Best Outside Spiker	Joshua Umandal	
2023	Invitational	1st Best Middle Blocker	John Paul Bugaoan	
2023	Invitational	Best Libero	Manuel Sumanguid III	
2024	Open	Most Valuable Player (Finals)	Bryan Bagunas	
2024	Open	1st Best Outside Spiker	Joshua Umandal	
2024	Open	Best Setter	Kris Cian Silang	
2024	Invitational	Most Valuable Player (Finals)	Louie Ramirez	
2024	Invitational	Best Libero	Vince Lorenzo	
2025	Open	Most Valuable Player (Finals)	Steven Rotter	
2025	Open	Best Opposite Spiker	Steven Rotter	
2025	Open	1st Best Middle Blocker	John Paul Bugaoan	
2025	Open	Best Libero	Vince Lorenzo	
2025	Invitational	2nd Best Outside Spiker	Joshua Umandal	

Premier Volleyball League:

Season	Conference	Award	Name	Source
2017	Reinforced	Most Valuable Player (Finals)	Lorenzo Capate Jr.	
2017	Reinforced	Best Setter	Vincent Raphael Mangulabnan	
2017	Reinforced	1st Best Outside Spiker	Mark Gil Alfafara	
2017	Open	Most Valuable Player (Conference & Finals)	Lorenzo Capate Jr.	
2017	Open	Best Setter	Vincent Raphael Mangulabnan	
2017	Open	Best Libero	Sandy Domenick Montero	
2018	Reinforced	Most Valuable Player (Conference)	Marck Espejo	
2018	Reinforced	1st Best Outside Spiker	Marck Espejo	
2018	Reinforced	1st Best Middle Blocker	Rex Emmanuel Intal	

Philippine SuperLiga:

Season	Conference	Award	Name	Source
2014	All-Filipino	2nd Best Outside Spiker	Howard Mojica	
2014	All-Filipino	Best Opposite Spiker	Gilbert Ablan	
2014	Grand Prix	Best Libero	Sandy Montero	
2014	Grand Prix	Best Opposite Spiker	Gilbert Ablan	
2014	Grand Prix	2nd Best Middle Blocker	Rayson Fuentes	
2014	Grand Prix	2nd Best Outside Spiker	Lorenzo Capate Jr.	
2014	Grand Prix	Most Valuable Player	Lorenzo Capate Jr.	

PNVF:

Season	Award	Name	Source
2022	Most Valuable Player	Marck Espejo	
2022	2nd Best Outside Spiker	Marck Espejo	
2022	1st Best Middle Blocker	John Paul Bugaoan	
2022	Best Libero	Manuel Sumanguid III	
2023	1st Best Middle Blocker	John Paul Bugaoan	
2023	Best Libero	Manuel Sumanguid III	
2024	Most Valuable Player	Joshua Umandal	
2024	1st Best Outside Spiker	Joshua Umandal	
2024	2nd Best Middle Blocker	John Paul Bugaoan	
2024	Best Setter	EJ Casaña	

== Team captains ==
- (Philippines) Dexter Clamor (2014)
- (Philippines) Jay dela Cruz (2014 – 2016)
- (Philippines) Herschel Ramos (2016)
- (Philippines) Ysay Marasigan (2017 – 2023)
- (Philippines) John Paul Bugaoan (2024 – 2025)

== Coaches ==
- (Philippines) Michael Cariño (2014–2016)
- (Philippines) Oliver Almadro (2017–2018)
- (Philippines) Dexter Clamor (2019–2025)

== See also ==
- Cignal Super Spikers (women)
