= Manuel Sumanguid III =

Filipino volleyball player (born 1998)

Manuel Sumanguid
Personal information
- Full name: Manuel Sumanguid III
- Nickname: Sumang
- Nationality: Filipino
- Born: January 25, 1998 (age 28)
- Education: Ateneo De Manila University
- Height: 1.70 m (5 ft 7 in)

Volleyball information
- Position: Libero
- Current club: Criss Cross King Crunchers
- Number: 22

Career
- Years: Team
- 2019–2023: Cignal HD Spikers
- 2024–present: Criss Cross King Crunchers

National team
- Years: Team
- 2021–present: Philippines

Manuel Sumanguid III (born January 25, 1998) is a Filipino volleyball athlete. He played with Ateneo Blue Eagles collegiate men's University team. He is currently playing for the Criss Cross King Crunchers in the Spikers' Turf.

== Personal life ==
Sumanguid attended the National University and the Ateneo De Manila University.

== Career ==
Sumanguid was a member of the Ateneo Blue Eagles men's volleyball team and he became a Libero.

In 2019, he was signed by the Cignal HD Spikers.

In 2022, he played for the national team in the 31st Southeast Asian Games in Vietnam.

== Clubs ==
- (Philippines) Cignal HD Spikers (2019–2023)
- (Philippines) Criss Cross King Crunchers (2024–present)

== Awards ==
=== Individual ===
Year	League	Season/Conference	Award	Ref
2017	PVL	Collegiate	Best Libero	
2019	UAAP	81	Best Libero	
2019	Spikers' Turf	Reinforced	Best Libero	
2022	Spikers' Turf	Open	Best Libero	
2022	PNVF	Champions League	Best Libero	
2023	Spikers' Turf	Open	Best Libero	
2023	PNVF	Challenge Cup	Best Libero	
2023	Spikers' Turf	Invitational	Best Libero	

=== Collegiate ===
==== Ateneo Blue Eagles ====
Year	League	Season/Conference	Title	Ref
2015	Spikers' Turf	Collegiate	Champions	
2016	UAAP	77	Champions	
2017	UAAP	78	Champions	
2017	PVL	Collegiate	Champions	
2017	UAAP	79	Champions	
2018	UAAP	80	Runner-up	
2019	UAAP	81	3rd place	

=== Club ===
Year	League	Season/Conference	Club	Title	Ref
2019	Spikers' Turf	Reinforced	Cignal HD Spikers	Champions	
2019	Spikers' Turf	Open	Cignal HD Spikers	Champions	
2022	Spikers' Turf	Open	Cignal HD Spikers	Runner-up	
2022	PNVF	Champions League	Cignal HD Spikers	Champions	
2023	Spikers' Turf	Open	Cignal HD Spikers	Champions	
2023	Spikers' Turf	Invitational	Cignal HD Spikers	Runner-up	
2023	PNVF	Challenge Cup	Cignal HD Spikers	Runner-up	
2024	Spikers' Turf	Open	Criss Cross King Crunchers	Runner-up	
2024	Spikers' Turf	Invitational	Criss Cross King Crunchers	Runner-up	
2025	Spikers' Turf	Open	Criss Cross King Crunchers	Runner-up	
