= VNS Griffins =

Professional men's volleyball team in the Philippines

- Full name: Volleyball Never Stops Volleyball Club Griffins
- Short name: VNS
- Nickname: Griffins
- Founded: 2013
- History: Bounty Fresh Soaring Griffins; 2016; 100 Plus Active Spikers; 2016; Café Lupe Sunrisers; 2017; Fury Blazing Hitters; 2018; VNS Griffins; 2019, 2022–present Manileño Spikers; 2021; VNS–One Alicia Griffins; 2022; VNS–Nasty Griffins; 2024; VNS–Laticrete Griffins; 2025, 2026–present VNS Always Bright Laticrete Griffins; 2026
- Head coach: Ralph Ocampo
- Captain: John Joshua Cruz
- League: Spikers' Turf
- 2026 Invitational: 10th place

Uniforms
Home	Away

The Volleyball Never Stops Griffins, commonly known as the VNS Griffins, are a Philippine professional men's volleyball team. The team competes in Spikers' Turf, where they have played since 2016.

The team was founded in 2013 as a way for collegiate players to be able to play competitive volleyball after graduating. For sponsorship reasons, the team is also known as the VNS–Laticrete Griffins.

== History ==
Volleyball Never Stops or VNS was established in 2013 by a group of team captains who played volleyball either at the University Athletic Association of the Philippines (UAAP) or the National Collegiate Athletic Association (NCAA) as a means to be still able to play competitive volleyball even after they graduated from college. At the time, there was no preeminent men's volleyball league in the country, and neither the Philippine Super Liga nor Shakey's V-League have set-up their respective men's divisions (both were established in 2014). VNS often took part in exhibition games and various minor tournaments and were joined in by other UAAP and NCAA graduates.

In 2016, they were invited to take part in the semi-professional men's volleyball league, Spikers' Turf. They played under the name of their sponsor Bounty Fresh in their debut at the 2016 Open Conference. For the season-ending 2016 Reinforced Conference, they under the banner of another sponsor as the 100 Plus Active Spikers. In 2017, they joined the Premier Volleyball League, and took part as the Café Lupe Sunrisers for the whole 2017 season.

They would return to the Spiker's Turf in 2018 as the Fury Blazing Hitters. In 2019, they played as the VNS Griffins.

In 2021, VNS would take part in the 2021 PNVF Champions League as the Manileño Spikers. The Spikes clinched the bronze medal in the tournament, defeating Global Remit in the third place play off.

As of 2025, VNS is still known for drawing its players mostly from newly graduated college players although they are reinforced by more experienced players.

== Current roster ==
VNS Laticrete
Number	Player	Position	School
1	Kimmy Liray	Outside Hitter	
2	Joshua Cruz	Libero	
3	Howard Guerra	Setter	
4	Klause Dais	Setter	
5	Andrei Bakil	Middle Blocker	
6	Axel Book	Outside Hitter	
7	Jayvee Sumagaysay	Middle Blocker	UST
8	Mike Ferrer	Middle Blocker	
9	Mohammad Sedique Patadon	Libero	
10	Jimwel Stephen Guerra	Setter	
11	Terrence Marticion	Outside Hitter	
12	Julius Jao Arcillo	Outside Hitter	
13	Kevin Montemayor	Opposite Hitter	
14	Titus Villacrusis	Middle Blocker	
15	Roderick Medino	Opposite Hitter	
16	Jerremy Pedrosa (C)	Opposite Hitter	
19	John Diwa	Middle Blocker	
20	John Derrick Bautista	Outside Hitter	
22	Al Cordero	Middle Blocker	
23	Aidjien Rus	Libero	

- Head coach: Ralph Raymond Ocampo
- Assistant coach: John Patrick De Guzman

== Honors ==
=== Team ===
Spikers' Turf/Premier Volleyball League:

Season	Conference	Title	Source
2016	Open	5th place	
2016	Reinforced	6th place	
2017	Reinforced (Note: with the Premier Volleyball League)	6th place	
2017	Open	8th place	
2018	Reinforced	did not compete	
2018	Open	9th place	
2019	Reinforced	9th place	
2019	Open	11th place	
2022	Open	4th place	
2023	Open	5th place	
2023	Invitational	10th place	
2024–25	Open	6th place	
2024–25	Invitational	8th place	
2024–25	Open	4th place	
2025–26	Invitational	9th place	
2025–26	Open	6th place	
2026–27	Invitational	10th place	

Notes

PNVF:

Season	Placement	Ref.
2021	3rd place	
2022	9th place	
2023	3rd place	
2024	4th place	

=== Individual ===
Spikers' Turf/Premier Volleyball League:

Season	Conference	Award	Name	Ref.
2022	Open	2nd Best Outside Spiker	John Benedict San Andres	

PNVF:

Season	Conference	Award	Name	Ref.
2021	Champions League	2nd Best Middle Blocker	Rwenzmel Taguibolos	
2023	Challenge Cup	Best Setter	Jerome Lopez	
2024	Champions League	Best Opposite Spiker	Kevin Montemayor	

== Team captains ==
- Ralph Raymund Ocampo (2016–2017)
- Phillip Michael Bagalay (2018, 2023)
- Geuel Asia (2019)
- John Benedict San Andres (2022)
- Ron Medalla (2023)
- Michael Doria (2024)
- Charles Jordan Segui (2024–2025)
- Jerremy Pedrosa (2025)
- John Joshua Cruz (2026–present)

== Coaches ==
- Fritz Michael Santos (2016)
- John Pat de Guzman (2016–2017)
- Rodrigo Palmero (2017)
- Ralph Raymund Ocampo (2018–present)
