= D'Navigators Iloilo =

Men's professional volleyball team based in Iloilo City

- Head coach: Boyet Delmoro
- Captain: John Michael Apolinario (UE)
- League: Spikers' Turf
- 2024 Invitational: 9th place

D'Navigators Iloilo were a men's volleyball team in the Philippines representing Iloilo City. The team competed in Spikers' Turf from 2023 to 2024.

== History ==
Iloilo City-based D' Navigators Iloilo entered the Spikers' Turf, debuting at the 2023 Open Conference. Prior to their participating they won the 2023 Dinagyang Volleyball League.

== Current roster ==
D'Navigators Iloilo
Number	Player	Position	School
1	Rick Adao	Libero	
2	Kyle Angelo Villamor	Outside Hitter	
3	Kim Harold Dayandante	Setter	NU
4	John Wayne Araño	Setter	
5	Kyle Adrian Ramones	Middle Blocker	
6	John Michael Apolinario (C)	Setter	UE
7	Jayvee Sumagaysay	Middle Blocker	UST
8	Van Tracy Prudenciado	Libero	
9	Jhonmark Espanso	Libero	
10	Steven Sta. Maria	Opposite Hitter	
11	Edward Camposano	Outside Hitter	NU
12	Jerome Lopez	Setter	
13	Barbie San Andres	Outside Hitter	
14	Abdurasad Nursiddik	Middle Blocker	
15	Bryan James Jaleco	Outside Hitter	
16	Geffrey Alicando	Middle Blocker	
18	Madzlan Gampong	Opposite Hitter	
20	Kent Sabando	Outside Hitter	
25	Vince Virrey Himzon	Middle Blocker	

- Head coach: Boyet Delmoro
- Assistant coach: Michael Sabitchana

== Honors ==
=== Team ===
Spikers' Turf:

Season	Conference	Title	Source
2023	Open	4th place	
2023	Invitational	14th place	
2024	Open	4th place	
2024	Invitational	9th place	

PNVF:

Year	Tournament	Title	Source
2023	PNVF Challenge Cup	7th place	
2024	PNVF Champions League	Runners-up	

=== Individual ===
Spikers' Turf:

Season	Conference	Award	Name	Source
2023	Open	1st Best Outside Spiker	Jade Alex Disquitado	
2023	Open	2nd Best Middle Blocker	Mfena Gwaza	
2023	Open	Best Setter	John Michael Apolinario	
2024	Open	Best Opposite Spiker	Francis Saura	
2024	Open	2nd Best Middle Blocker	Abdurasad Nursiddik	

PNVF:

Season	Award	Name	Source
2024	2nd Best Outside Spiker	Barbie San Andres	
2024	1st Best Middle Blocker	Jayvee Sumagaysay	

== Team captains ==
- (Philippines) Jerome Cordez (2023)
- (Philippines) John Michael Apolinario (2023–2024)

== Coaches ==
- (Philippines) Kenneth Panes (2023)
- (Philippines) Boyet Delmoro (2023–2024)
