= Joshua Umandal =

Filipino volleyball player (born 1998)

Personal information
- Full name: Joshua Autajay Umandal
- Nickname: Jau
- Nationality: Filipino
- Born: March 8, 1998 (age 28) Manila, Philippines
- Education: University of Santo Tomas (2018–20)
- Height: 1.88 m (6 ft 2 in)
- Weight: 88 kg (194 lb)

Volleyball information
- Current club: VNS Griffins

Career
- Years: Team
- –: PLDT
- 2021: Rebisco PH
- 2022: Bani Jamra
- 2022–2023: AMC Cotabato Spikers
- 2023–2025: Cignal HD Spikers
- 2026: Alpha Insurance Protectors
- 2026–present: VNS Griffins

National team
- Years: Team
- –: Philippines
Honours
Men's volleyball
Representing Philippines
Southeast Asian Games
Silver medal – second place	2019 Manila	Team

Joshua "Jau" Autajay Umandal (born March 8, 1998) is a Filipino volleyball player for the VNS Griffins and the Philippine national team.

== Career ==
=== Early career ===
Umandal attended the University of the East (UE) playing junior volleyball for the UE Warriors in the UAAP. He was scouted as an elementary student by UE when the institution held a training camp at his school, the Barrio Obrero Elementary School in Maypajo, Manila.

He moved to the University of Santo Tomas (UST), but he had to serve a year of residency in order to play for the Growling Tigers in the UAAP. He played with the Tigers for the meantime in the Collegiate Conference of the Premier Volleyball League (PVL) during the 2017 season. Umandal would make his senior UAAP debut with UST in 2018 in Season 80. His last appearance in the UAAP would be in Season 82 which was cancelled due to the COVID-19 pandemic.

=== Club ===
Umandal has played for the PLDT at the Spikers' Turf.

In 2021, Umandal was part of Rebisco PH, the Philippine men's national team competing as a club side. Rebisco PH participated at the 2021 Asian Men's Club Volleyball Championship where it placed ninth.

In January 2022, Umandal was signed in to play for Bani Jamra of the Isa bin Rashid Volleyball League, a first division league in Bahrain. Umandal won one out of six games he played for Bani Jamra. He ended his stint with the club in February 2022.

Umandal then joined the AMC Cotabato Spikers helping them finished as runners-up in the 2023 Spikers' Turf Open Conference, before joining the Cignal HD Spikers in the lead up to the 2023 Invitational Conference

In 2026, Umandal played for the Alpha Insurance Protectors in the 2026 Open Conference After a six month break, he joined the VNS Griffins for the 2026 Spikers' Turf Invitational Conference.

=== National team ===
Umandal has been part of the Philippine men's national team. He was part of the squad which won silver in the men's tournament of the 2019 Southeast Asian Games.

== Clubs ==
- (Philippines) PDLT (before 2022)
- (Bahrain) Bani Jamra (2022)
- (Philippines) AMC Cotabato Spikers (2022–2023)
- (Philippines) Cignal HD Spikers (2023–2025)
- (Philippines) Alpha Insurance Protectors (2026)
- (Philippines) VNS Griffins (2026)
