= 2023 Spikers' Turf Open Conference =

First Conference of the 2023 SPT season

- Duration: January 22 – March 31, 2023
- Teams: 11
- Matches: 65
- Attendance: 14,134 (217 per match)

Results
- Champions: Cignal HD Spikers
- Runners-up: AMC Cotabato Spikers
- Third place: Imus City–AJAA Spikers
- Fourth place: D'Navigators Iloilo

Awards
- Conference MVP: Joshua Umandal
- Finals MVP: Marck Espejo
- Best OH: Jade Disquitado; Wendel Miguel
- Best MB: John Paul Bugaoan; Mfena Gwaza
- Best OPP: Ysay Marasigan
- Best Setter: John Michael Apolinario
- Best Libero: Manuel Sumanguid III

Spikers' Turf Open Conference chronology
- < 2022 2024 >

Spikers' Turf conference chronology
- < 2022 Open 2023 Invitational >

The 2023 Spikers' Turf Open Conference was the first conference of the 2023 season of Spikers' Turf and the seventh running of the Open Conference. The tournament began on January 22, 2023, with a total of eleven teams, including four new teams at the Paco Arena, Paco, Manila. This was the first conference of the league to use a Video Challenge.

== Participating teams ==
2023 Spikers' Turf Open Conference
Abbr.	Team	Affiliation	Head coach	Team captain
AMC	AMC Cotabato Spikers	AMC Volleyball / Cotabato	Arthur Mamon	Jayvee Sumagaysay
CHD	Cignal HD Spikers	Cignal TV, Inc.	Dexter Clamor	Ysrael Wilson Marasigan
DNV	D' Navigators Iloilo	Iloilo City	Kenneth Panes	Jerome Cordez
IMU	Imus City–AJAA Spikers	Imus City / Ivy Tuason Photography	Sinfronio Acaylar	Esmilzo Polvorosa
NU	NU-Archipelago Bulldogs	National University / Archipelago Builders	Dante Alinsunurin	Joseph Bello
PJN	PGJC Navy Sea Lions	Philippine Navy	Cecille Cruzada	Gregorio Dolor
PAF	Philippine Air Force Air Spikers	Philippine Air Force	Jhimson Merza	Jessie Lopez
PAR	Philippine Army Troopers	Philippine Army	Melvin Carolino	Benjaylo Labide
SRC	Santa Rosa City Lions	Department of Education City Division of Sta. Rosa	Edward Jan Lirio	Harvey Quezada
VVH	Vanguard Volley Hitters	Vanguard Volleyball Team	Edjet Mabbayad	Ronchette Lee Villegas
VNS	VNS Griffins	VNS Management Group	Ralph Raymund Ocampo	Ron Medalla

== Transactions ==
=== Team additions and transfers ===
The following are the players who transferred to another team for this conference.

Player	Moving from	Moving to	Ref.
Edward Camposano	Cignal HD Spikers	AMC Cotabato Spikers	
Fauzi Kasim Ismail	Go for Gold-Air Force Aguilas	AMC Cotabato Spikers	
Jayvee Sumagaysay	Team Dasma Monarchs	AMC Cotabato Spikers	
John Vic De Guzman	Go for Gold-Air Force Aguilas	AMC Cotabato Spikers	
Joshua Umandal	PGJC Navy Sea Lions	AMC Cotabato Spikers	
Kim Harold Dayandante	Go for Gold-Air Force Aguilas	AMC Cotabato Spikers	
Kris Cian Silang	Team Dasma Monarchs	AMC Cotabato Spikers	
Lloyd Josafat	Go for Gold-Air Force Aguilas	AMC Cotabato Spikers	
Madzlan Gampong	Army-Katinko Troopers	AMC Cotabato Spikers	
Manuel Andrei Medina	Team Dasma Monarchs	AMC Cotabato Spikers	
Rex Emmanuel Intal	Cignal HD Spikers	AMC Cotabato Spikers	
Steven Rotter	Long Beach State Beach (United States)	AMC Cotabato Spikers	
Vince Patrick Lorenzo	PGJC Navy Sea Lions	AMC Cotabato Spikers	
EJ Casaña	PGJC Navy Sea Lions	Cignal HD Spikers	
Gadpray Aresgado	Bacolod City Tarags	Cignal HD Spikers	
Deanne Neil De Pedro	Bacolod City Tarags	D' Navigators Iloilo	
Jade Alex Disquitado	Sta. Rosa City Lions	D' Navigators Iloilo	
Rash Nursiddik	Bacolod City Tarags	D' Navigators Iloilo	
Angelino Pertierra	Cignal HD Spikers	Imus City–AJAA Spikers	
Bonjomar Castel	Philippine Navy Sea Lions	Imus City–AJAA Spikers	
Bryan Bagunas	Win Streak (Taiwan)	Imus City–AJAA Spikers	
Esmilzo Joner Polvorosa	VNS-One Alicia Griffins	Imus City–AJAA Spikers	
Francis Saura	Go for Gold-Air Force Aguilas	Imus City–AJAA Spikers	
Hero Austria	Perpetual Altas (NCAA)	Imus City–AJAA Spikers	
Ishmael John Rivera	Ateneo Blue Eagles (UAAP)	Imus City–AJAA Spikers	
James Martin Natividad	Sta. Elena-NU Ball Hammers	Imus City–AJAA Spikers	
Kim Malabunga	VNS-One Alicia Griffins	Imus City–AJAA Spikers	
Louie Ramirez	Cignal HD Spikers	Imus City–AJAA Spikers	
Rey Taneo	Army-Katinko Troopers	Imus City–AJAA Spikers	
Ricky Marcos	Sta. Elena-NU Ball Hammers	Imus City–AJAA Spikers	
Ridzuan Muhali	Perpetual Altas (NCAA)	Imus City–AJAA Spikers	
Rikko Marius Marmeto	Go for Gold-Air Force Aguilas	Imus City–AJAA Spikers	
Ronniel Rosales	PGJC Navy Sea Lions	Imus City–AJAA Spikers	
Alfredo Pagulong	VNS-One Alicia Griffins	PGJC Navy Sea Lions	
Berhashidin Daymil	Sta. Elena-NU Ball Hammers	PGJC Navy Sea Lions	
Christian Celis	Adamson Soaring Falcons (UAAP)	PGJC Navy Sea Lions	
Jeffrey Alicando	Adamson Soaring Falcons (UAAP)	PGJC Navy Sea Lions	
Owen Jaime Suarez	Cignal HD Spikers	PGJC Navy Sea Lions	
Sean Victor Padon	FEU Tamaraws (UAAP)	PGJC Navy Sea Lions	
Rence Melgar	Team Dasma Monarchs	Philippine Air Force Air Spikers	
Aljune Centeno	Letran Knights (NCAA)	Santa Rosa City Lions	
Mark Kevin Motemayor	VNS Griffins	Santa Rosa City Lions	
Uriel Mendoza	VNS Griffins	Santa Rosa City Lions	
Clark Fernandez	Bacolod City Tarags	Vanguard Volley Hitters	
John Carlo Desuyo	IEM Phoenix Volley Masters	Vanguard Volley Hitters	
John Daniel Diwa	Army-Katinko Troopers	Vanguard Volley Hitters	
Joven Camaganakan	Bacolod City Tarags	Vanguard Volley Hitters	
Razzel Palisoc	Basilan Steel Spikers	Vanguard Volley Hitters	
Ronchette Lee Villegas	Bacolod City Tarags	Vanguard Volley Hitters	
Ruvince Abrot	Bacolod City Tarags	Vanguard Volley Hitters	
Mark Deximo	Benilde Blazers (NCAA)	VNS Griffins	
Philip Michael Bagalay	Mapúa Cardinals (NCAA)	VNS Griffins	
Ron Medalla	Global Remit	VNS Griffins	

== Venue ==
Preliminary round	Final round
Manila
Paco Arena	Rizal Memorial Coliseum
Capacity: 1,000	Capacity: 6,100

== Format ==
Preliminary round

- The preliminary round was a single round-robin tournament, with each team playing one match against all other teams for a total of ten matches.
- The top four teams advanced to the semifinals while the bottom seven were eliminated.

Semifinals

- The semifinals was also a single round-robin, with each team playing a total of three matches during this round.
- The top two teams advanced to the championship while the bottom two would play in the third-place series.

Finals

- The championship and third-place series were best-of-three series.
- The match-ups were as follows:
  - Championship: SF#1 vs. SF#2
  - Third-place series: SF#3 vs. SF#4

== Pool standing procedure ==
- First, teams are ranked by the number of matches won.
- If the number of matches won is tied, the tied teams are then ranked by match points, wherein:
  - Match won 3–0 or 3–1: 3 match points for the winner, 0 match points for the loser.
  - Match won 3–2: 2 match points for the winner, 1 match point for the loser.
- In case of any further ties, the following criteria shall be used:
  - Set ratio: the number of sets won divided by number of sets lost.
  - Point ratio: number of points scored divided by number of points allowed.
  - Head-to-head standings: any remaining tied teams are ranked based on the results of head-to-head matches involving the teams in question.

== Preliminary round ==
- All times are Philippine Standard Time (UTC+08:00).

=== Ranking ===
Pos	Team	Pld	W	L	Pts	SW	SL	SR	SPW	SPL	SPR	Qualification
1	Cignal HD Spikers	10	10	0	30	30	1	30.000	777	590	1.317	Final round
2	AMC Cotabato Spikers	10	9	1	27	27	7	3.857	819	704	1.163	Final round
3	D' Navigators Iloilo	10	7	3	20	24	16	1.500	888	884	1.005	Final round
4	Imus City–AJAA Spikers	10	7	3	20	23	17	1.353	919	808	1.137	Final round
5	VNS Griffins	10	6	4	16	21	19	1.105	865	891	0.971	
6	PGJC Navy Sea Lions	10	5	5	16	22	21	1.048	957	934	1.025	
7	Santa Rosa City Lions	10	4	6	11	16	22	0.727	836	887	0.943	
8	Philippine Army Troopers	10	3	7	9	17	26	0.654	889	983	0.904	
9	Philippine Air Force Air Spikers	10	2	8	6	10	26	0.385	770	850	0.906	
10	NU-Archipelago Builders	10	1	9	7	13	28	0.464	872	922	0.946	
11	Vanguard Volley Hitters	10	1	9	3	9	29	0.310	771	910	0.847	

Source: TeamPilipinas.info

=== Match results ===
Date	Time		Score		Set 1	Set 2	Set 3	Set 4	Set 5	Total	Report
22 Jan	16:00	Imus City–AJAA Spikers	3–1	Santa Rosa City Lions	25–22	28–26	29–31	25–16		107–95	P2
22 Jan	18:00	PGJC Navy Sea Lions	2–3	Philippine Army Troopers	23–25	25–19	25–20	22–25	12–15	107–104	P2
25 Jan	16:00	Philippine Air Force Air Spikers	0–3	D' Navigators Iloilo	21–25	23–25	19–25			63–75	P2
25 Jan	18:00	Vanguard Volley Hitters	3–2	NU-Archipelago Builders	25–18	18–25	26–24	13–25	15–10	97–102	P2
27 Jan	16:00	Santa Rosa City Lions	0–3	Cignal HD Spikers	19–25	18–25	17–25			54–75	P2
27 Jan	18:00	AMC Cotabato Spikers	3–0	VNS Griffins	25–21	25–16	25–23			75–60	P2
29 Jan	15:00	Imus City–AJAA Spikers	3–0	Philippine Air Force Air Spikers	25–16	25–16	25–13			75–45	P2
29 Jan	17:30	NU-Archipelago Builders	0–3	D' Navigators Iloilo	23–25	20–25	21–25			64–75	P2
01 Feb	15:00	Philippine Army Troopers	1–3	AMC Cotabato Spikers	15–25	25–23	22–25	24–26		86–99	P2
01 Feb	17:30	VNS Griffins	3–0	Vanguard Volley Hitters	25–18	30–28	26–24			81–70	P2
03 Feb	15:00	PGJC Navy Sea Lions	3–0	Santa Rosa City Lions	25–19	25–14	25–23			75–56	P2
03 Feb	17:30	Cignal HD Spikers	3–0	Imus City–AJAA Spikers	25–16	25–22	25–22			75–60	P2
05 Feb	15:00	D' Navigators Iloilo	3–1	VNS Griffins	23–25	25–16	25–22	25–23		98–86	P2
05 Feb	17:30	NU-Archipelago Builders	2–3	Philippine Air Force Air Spikers	21–25	28–30	25–20	25–17	4–15	103–107	P2
08 Feb	15:00	Vanguard Volley Hitters	1–3	Philippine Army Troopers	19–25	22–25	25–22	18–25		84–97	P2
08 Feb	17:30	Santa Rosa City Lions	1–3	AMC Cotabato Spikers	22–25	25–22	20–25	17–25		84–97	P2
10 Feb	15:00	Imus City–AJAA Spikers	3–2	PGJC Navy Sea Lions	25–20	25–16	21–25	21–25	15–12	107–98	P2
10 Feb	17:30	Philippine Air Force Air Spikers	0–3	Cignal HD Spikers	22–25	16–25	25–27			63–77	P2
12 Feb	12:30	Philippine Army Troopers	1–3	D' Navigators Iloilo	25–17	20–25	24–26	18–25		87–93	P2
12 Feb	15:00	VNS Griffins	3–2	NU-Archipelago Builders	25–21	25–21	19–25	20–25	17–15	106–107	P2
12 Feb	17:30	Vanguard Volley Hitters	2–3	Santa Rosa City Lions	25–21	17–25	22–25	25–23	11–15	100–109	P2
15 Feb	15:00	Philippine Air Force Air Spikers	1–3	VNS Griffins	23–25	25–23	22–25	23–25		93–98	P2
15 Feb	17:30	PGJC Navy Sea Lions	0–3	Cignal HD Spikers	24–26	21–25	17–25			62–76	P2
17 Feb	15:00	Imus City–AJAA Spikers	3–1	Vanguard Volley Hitters	23–25	25–17	25–15	25–20		98–77	P2
17 Feb	17:30	Philippine Army Troopers	2–3	Santa Rosa City Lions	25–27	25–23	25–21	24–26	8–15	107–112	P2
19 Feb	15:00	PGJC Navy Sea Lions	3–1	Philippine Air Force Air Spikers	25–18	24–26	25–22	25–21		99–87	P2
19 Feb	17:30	Cignal HD Spikers	3–0	VNS Griffins	25–18	25–17	25–15			75–50	P2
22 Feb	15:00	Imus City–AJAA Spikers	3–1	Philippine Army Troopers	25–18	25–14	23–25	25–18		98–75	P2
22 Feb	17:30	PGJC Navy Sea Lions	3–1	Vanguard Volley Hitters	25–17	25–22	23–25	25–23		98–87	P2
24 Feb	15:00	Philippine Air Force Air Spikers	0–3	Santa Rosa City Lions	22–25	23–25	23–25			68–75	P2
24 Feb	17:30	Philippine Army Troopers	0–3	Cignal HD Spikers	18–25	20–25	14–25			52–75	P2
26 Feb	15:00	Vanguard Volley Hitters	0–3	Cignal HD Spikers	16–25	18–25	24–26			58–76	P2
26 Feb	17:30	VNS Griffins	3–2	Imus City–AJAA Spikers	12–25	25–20	25–21	11–25	15–13	88–104	P2
01 Mar	12:30	Philippine Army Troopers	3–2	Philippine Air Force Air Spikers	23–25	26–24	18–25	25–22	20–18	112–114	P2
01 Mar	15:00	NU-Archipelago Builders	0–3	AMC Cotabato Spikers	23–25	15–25	20–25			58–75	P2
01 Mar	17:30	D' Navigators Iloilo	3–2	PGJC Navy Sea Lions	28–26	25–21	20–25	15–25	15–11	103–108	P2
03 Mar	15:00	AMC Cotabato Spikers	3–0	Imus City–AJAA Spikers	25–23	25–20	25–18			75–61	P2
03 Mar	17:30	Santa Rosa City Lions	2–3	D' Navigators Iloilo	25–19	25–21	26–28	24–26	13–15	113–109	P2
05 Mar	12:30	NU-Archipelago Builders	3–1	Philippine Army Troopers	25–21	25–17	23–25	25–18		98–81	P2
05 Mar	15:00	Cignal HD Spikers	3–0	AMC Cotabato Spikers	25–15	25–21	25–17			75–53	P2
05 Mar	17:30	Vanguard Volley Hitters	0–3	Philippine Air Force Air Spikers	14–25	24–26	23–25			61–76	P2
08 Mar	15:00	NU-Archipelago Builders	0–3	Santa Rosa City Lions	24–26	24–26	22–25			70–77	P2
08 Mar	17:30	D' Navigators Iloilo	2–3	Imus City–AJAA Spikers	16–25	25–23	14–25	25–22	14–16	94–111	P2
10 Mar	15:00	AMC Cotabato Spikers	3–1	PGJC Navy Sea Lions	25–22	23–25	25–15	25–20		98–82	P2
10 Mar	17:30	Cignal HD Spikers	3–0	D' Navigators Iloilo	25–19	25–22	25–15			75–56	P2
12 Mar	12:30	Santa Rosa City Lions	0–3	VNS Griffins	17–25	17–25	27–29			61–79	P2
12 Mar	15:00	Imus City–AJAA Spikers	3–1	NU-Archipelago Builders	25–20	23–25	25–22	25–19		98–86	P2
12 Mar	17:30	Vanguard Volley Hitters	0–3	AMC Cotabato Spikers	20–25	14–25	23–25			57–75	P2
15 Mar	15:00	Philippine Army Troopers	2–3	VNS Griffins	14–25	25–20	25–18	11–25	13–15	88–103	P2
15 Mar	17:30	PGJC Navy Sea Lions	3–2	NU-Archipelago Builders	25–19	23–25	25–22	20–25	15–11	108–102	P2
17 Mar	15:00	D' Navigators Iloilo	3–1	Vanguard Volley Hitters	23–25	25–12	25–22	25–21		98–80	P2
17 Mar	17:30	Philippine Air Force Air Spikers	0–3	AMC Cotabato Spikers	16–25	21–25	17–25			54–75	P2
19 Mar	12:30	VNS Griffins	2–3	PGJC Navy Sea Lions	25–23	34–32	20–25	22–25	13–15	114–120	P2
19 Mar	15:00	NU-Archipelago Builders	1–3	Cignal HD Spikers	18–25	17–25	25–23	22–25		82–98	P2
19 Mar	17:30	AMC Cotabato Spikers	3–1	D' Navigators Iloilo	25–18	25–22	22–25	25–22		97–87	P2

== Final round ==
- All times are Philippine Standard Time (UTC+8:00).

=== Semifinals ===
==== Ranking ====
Pos	Team	Pld	W	L	Pts	SW	SL	SR	SPW	SPL	SPR	Qualification
1	Cignal HD Spikers	3	3	0	9	9	1	9.000	248	195	1.272	Championship series
2	AMC Cotabato Spikers	3	1	2	3	4	6	0.667	228	229	0.996	Championship series
3	D' Navigators Iloilo	3	1	2	3	4	6	0.667	210	225	0.933	3rd place series
4	Imus City–AJAA Spikers	3	1	2	3	3	7	0.429	211	236	0.894	3rd place series

Source: TeamPilipinas.info

==== Match results ====
Date	Time		Score		Set 1	Set 2	Set 3	Set 4	Set 5	Total	Report
22 Mar	15:00	Cignal HD Spikers	3–0	Imus City–AJAA Spikers	25–23	25–19	25–15			75–57	P2
22 Mar	17:30	AMC Cotabato Spikers	0–3	D' Navigators Iloilo	19–25	22–25	23–25			64–75	P2
24 Mar	15:00	D' Navigators Iloilo	0–3	Cignal HD Spikers	17–25	16–25	19–25			52–75	P2
24 Mar	17:30	Imus City–AJAA Spikers	0–3	AMC Cotabato Spikers	19–25	26–28	23–25			68–78	P2
27 Mar	15:00	D' Navigators Iloilo	1–3	Imus City–AJAA Spikers	23–25	25–11	20–25	15–25		83–86	P2
27 Mar	17:30	Cignal HD Spikers	3–1	AMC Cotabato Spikers	26–17	25–21	22–25	25–23		98–86	P2

=== Finals ===
- All are best-of-three series.

==== 3rd place ====
- Imus wins the series, 1–1, via sets ratio of 1.33 vs. 0.750

Date	Time		Score		Set 1	Set 2	Set 3	Set 4	Set 5	Total	Report
29 Mar	15:00	Imus City–AJAA Spikers	1–3	D' Navigators Iloilo	25–21	23–25	21–25	22–25		91–96	P2
31 Mar	15:00	D' Navigators Iloilo	0–3	Imus City–AJAA Spikers	19–25	18–25	21–25			58–75	P2

==== Championship ====
- Cignal wins series, 2–0

Date	Time		Score		Set 1	Set 2	Set 3	Set 4	Set 5	Total	Report
29 Mar	17:30	AMC Cotabato Spikers	0–3	Cignal HD Spikers	22–25	22–25	26–28			70–78	P2
31 Mar	17:30	Cignal HD Spikers	3–2	AMC Cotabato Spikers	25–21	22–25	25–17	28–30	15–7	115–100	P2

== Awards ==
Award	Player	Team	Ref
Conference Most Valuable Player	Joshua Umandal	AMC Cotabato Spikers	
Finals Most Valuable Player	Marck Jesus Espejo	Cignal HD Spikers	
1st Best Outside Spiker	Jade Alex Disquitado	D' Navigators Iloilo	
2nd Best Outside Spiker	Wendel Concepcion Miguel	Cignal HD Spikers	
1st Best Middle Blocker	John Paul Bugaoan	Cignal HD Spikers	
2nd Best Middle Blocker	Mfena Gwaza	D' Navigators Iloilo	
Best Opposite Spiker	Ysrael Wilson Marasigan	Cignal HD Spikers	
Best Setter	John Michael Apolinario	D' Navigators Iloilo	
Best Libero	Manuel Sumanguid III	Cignal HD Spikers	

== Final standings ==
Rank	Team
1st place, gold medalist(s)	Cignal HD Spikers
2nd place, silver medalist(s)	AMC Cotabato Spikers
3rd place, bronze medalist(s)	Imus City–AJAA Spikers
4	D' Navigators Iloilo
5	VNS Griffins
6	PGJC Navy Sea Lions
7	Santa Rosa City Lions
8	Philippine Army Troopers
9	Philippine Air Force Air Spikers
10	NU-Archipelago Builders
11	Vanguard Volley Hitters

2023 Spikers' Turf Open champions
Cignal HD Spikers
Fourth title

Team roster:
Sandy Domenick Montero, Peter Denmar Torres, Edmar Lutcha Bonono, Alexis Faytaren, John Paul Bugaoan, Ysrael Wilson Marasigan (c), Gadpray Aresgado, Wendel Miguel, Alfred Valbuena, Chumason Celestine Njigha, Manuel Sumanguid III, Marck Espejo, Geuel Asia, Gariel EJ Casaña
Head coach:
Dexter Clamor

== See also ==
- 2023 Premier Volleyball League First All-Filipino Conference
