= UST Golden Spikers volleyball =

Volleyball team of the University of Santo Tomas

UST Golden Spikers
- Nickname: Golden Spikers
- Founded: 1938 (NCAA founding member–1924)
- Head coach: Odjie Mamon
- Captain: Dux Euan Yambao
- League: UAAP; Spikers' Turf; V-League
- Championships: UAAP: 18

The UST Golden Spikers are the men's collegiate varsity volleyball team of the University of Santo Tomas. They compete in the University Athletic Association of the Philippines (UAAP).

== History ==
The UST Tiger Spikers have 18 UAAP men's volleyball championships. The Golden Spikers achieved a four-peat in Seasons 70, 71, 72, and 73.

The Tiger Spikers also participate in the Spikers' Turf, a preseason league where they finished second in the 2018 Collegiate Conference and third on two occasions in 2016 and 2017.

The Golden Spikers were back-to-back UNIGAMES champions in 2016 and 2017.

== Current roster ==
UAAP Season 86 roster
Number	Player	Position	Height	Birthday	High School
1	Rey Miguel De Vega	Outside Hitter			UST High School
2	Kenneth John Salvador	Outside Hitter			
6	John Emmanuel Dedoroy	Outside Hitter	1.80 m (5 ft 11 in)	September 10, 2002 (age 23)	UST High School
7	Dux Euan Yambao (c)	Setter	1.78 m (5 ft 10 in)	March 7, 2002 (age 24)	University of the Immaculate Conception
9	Joshua Avila	Setter			
10	Rainier Flor	Middle Blocker			
11	Nathaniel Prudenciado	Libero			UST High School
13	Josh Ybañez	Outside Hitter	1.70 m (5 ft 7 in)	March 25, 2003 (age 23)	Labangal National High School
14	Trevor Valera	Middle Blocker		October 14, 2004 (age 21)	
15	Sherwin John Umandal	Opposite Hitter			
16	Edlyn Paul Colinares	Middle Blocker			UST High School
17	Ennius Gwen Colinares	Setter			
18	Van Tracy Prudenciado	Libero			UST High School
24	Jay Rack Dela Noche	Opposite Hitter			UST High School

== Awards ==
=== Team ===
==== UAAP ====
UST Golden Spikers (partial)
Year	UAAP Season	Title	Ref
1958	21	Champions	
1959	22	Champions	
1963	26	Champions	
1967	30	Champions	
1973	36	Champions	
1976	39	Champions	
1985	48	Champions	
1986	49	Champions	
1989	52	Champions	
1992	55	Champions	
1994	57	Runner-up	
1995	58	Champions	
1996	59	Runner-up	
1997	60	Runner-up	
1998	61	Champions	
1999	62	Runner-up	
2000	63	Champions	
2001	64	Runner-up	
2002	65	Champions	
2005	68	Runner-up	
2007	69	3rd place	
2008	70	Champions	
2009	71	Champions	
2010	72	Champions	
2011	73	Champions	
2012	74	Runner up	
2015	77	3rd place	
2023	85	Runner-up	
2024	86	Runner-up	
2025	87	3rd place	
2026	88	3rd place	

==== Spikers' Turf/PVL ====
UST Golden Spikers
Year	Season	Title	Ref
2016	Collegiate	3rd place	
2017	Collegiate	3rd place	
2018	Collegiate	Runner-up	

==== V-League PH ====
UST Golden Spikers
Year	Season	Title	Ref
2022	Collegiate	Runner-up	
2023	Collegiate	Runner-up	
2025	Collegiate	3rd place	

==== UNIGAMES ====
UST Golden Spikers
Year	Season	Title	Ref
2017	UNIGAMES	Champions	

=== Players ===
==== UAAP ====
UAAP awardees (partial)

UST Golden Spikers individual awards
Year	UAAP Season	Award	Player	Ref
1998	61	MVP	Oliver John Manlapaz	
2002	65	MVP	Anthony Irvin Guiao	
2007	69	RoY	Marlon Macabulos	
2008	70	MVP	Nazareno Roque	
2008	70	RoY	Jayson Ramos	
2008	70	Best Server	Ray Karl Dimaculangan	
2008	70	Best Digger	Charles Glendon Reyes	
2009	71	* MVP * Best Server	Ray Karl Dimaculangan	
2009	71	Best Attacker	Jayson Ramos	
2009	71	Best Receiver	Henry James Pecaña	
2010	72	MVP (Finals)	Henry James Pecaña	
2010	72	Best Server	Ray Karl Dimaculangan	
2011	73	* MVP (Season) * Best Attacker * Best Scorer	John Paul Torres	
2011	73	MVP (Finals)	Jayson Ramos	
2011	73	Best Receiver	Paul John Dolorias	
2012	74	MVP (Season)	Jayson Ramos	
2012	74	Best Receiver	Paul John Dolorias	
2013	75	* MVP (Season) * Best Blocker	Mark Alfafara	
2014	76	* Best Scorer * Best Attacker * Best Server	Mark Alfafara	
2015	77	Best Scorer	Mark Gil Alfafara	
2018	80	Best Blocker	Jayvee Sumagaysay	
2023	85	* MVP (Season) * RoY * 1st Best OH	Joshua Ybañez	
2023	85	Best OPP	Jay Rack Dela Noche	

== Season-by-season records ==
Records starting UAAP Season 56

Champion	Runner-up	Third place

Year	Season	Field	Eliminations					Playoffs			Ref.
Year	Season	Field	Finish	GP	W	L	SPR	Round	Opponent	Result	Ref.
1993	56	8	4th					Final Four		L	
1994	57	8	2nd					Finals	FEU Tamaraws	L	
1995	58	8	1st					Finals	De La Salle Green Archers	W	
1996	59	7	2nd					Finals	FEU Tamaraws	L	
1997	60	8	2nd					Finals	FEU Tamaraws	L	
1998	61	8	1st					Finals	FEU Tamaraws	W	
1999	62	8	2nd					Finals	FEU Tamaraws	L	
2000	63	8	1st					Finals	FEU Tamaraws	W	
2001	64	8	2nd					Finals	De La Salle Green Archers	L	
2002	65	8	2nd					Finals	De La Salle Green Archers	L	
2003	66	8	5th					Did not qualify			
2004	67	8	4th					Final Four		L	
1999	68	8	2nd					Finals	FEU Tamaraws	L	
2005	69	7	3rd	12	8	4	1.588	Semifinals	UP Fighting Maroons	L 1–2	
2008	70	8	2nd	14	13	1	4.000	Finals	#1 FEU Tamaraws	W 2–1	
2009	71	8	1st	14	14	0	1.000	Finals	#3 UP Fighting Maroons	W 2–0	
2010	72	8	1st	14	13	1	0.929	Finals	#2 FEU Tamaraws	W 2–0	
2011	73	8	1st	14	13	1	5.857	Finals	#2 FEU Tamaraws	W 2–0	
2012	74	8	2nd	14	11	3	2.118	Finals	#1 FEU Tamaraws	L 0–2	
2013	75	8	5th	14	7	7	1.019	Did not qualify			
2014	76	8	6th	14	5	9	0.980	Did not qualify			
2005	77	8	2nd	14	11	3	1.106	Semifinals	#2 NU Bulldogs	L 1–2	
2016	78	8	7th	14	4	10	0.970	Did not qualify			
2017	79	8	4th	14	6	8	0.913	Stepladder playoffs	#3 FEU Tamaraws	L 0–1	
2018	80	8	4th	14	6	8	1.004	#4th Seed playoffs #Semifinals	#5 Adamson Soaring Falcons #1 NU Bulldogs	W 1–0; L 0–2	
2019	81	8	5th	14	5	9	0.978	Did not qualify			
2020	82	Tournament cancelled									
2021	83	Tournament cancelled									
2021	84	Tournament cancelled									
2023	85	8	2nd	14	11	3	1.088	Finals	#1 NU Bulldogs	L 0–2	
2023	86	8	4th	14	8	6	1.060	Finals	#2 NU Bulldogs	L 0–2	
2025	87	8	3rd	14	9	5	1.238	Semifinals	#2 NU Bulldogs	L 0–2	

== Coaches ==
UST Golden Spikers
Coach	UAAP Season		Ref
Coach	From	To	Ref
Emil Lontoc	?	74	
Odjie Mamon	75	present	

== Notable players ==
- Mark Gil Alfafara
- Reny John Balse
- Robertly Boto
- Edlyn Paul Colinares
- Lorence Cruz
- Jay Rack Dela Noche
- Salvador Juan Depante
- Ray Karl Dimaculangan
- Paul Jan Doloiras
- Anthony Irvin Guiao
- Harby Ilano
- Ian Laurel
- Marlon Macabulos
- Charlee Magpayo
- Oliver John Manlapaz
- Henry James Pecaña
- Jayson Ramos
- Charles Glendon Reyes
- Nazareno Roque
- Jayvee Sumagaysay
- Yos Sioson
- John Paul Torres
- Kerr Sherwyn Ucang
- Joshua Umandal
- Francis Vicente
- Joshua Ybañez

== See also ==
- UST Growling Tigers
- UAAP Volleyball Championship
- Spikers' Turf award recipients
- La Salle–UST rivalry
- UST Golden Tigresses volleyball
