= FEU Lady Tamaraws volleyball =

Team of Far Eastern University, Philippines

FEU Lady Tamaraws
- University: Far Eastern University
- Nickname: Lady Tamaraws
- Location: Manila, Philippines
- Head coach: Cristina Salak
- Captain: Christine Ubaldo

Main league
- League: UAAP
- Season 87 (2025): 4th

Championships
- UAAP: 29

The FEU Lady Tamaraws volleyball program is the women's collegiate varsity volleyball team of the Far Eastern University in Manila, Philippines. The team competes in the University Athletic Association of the Philippines (UAAP).

== History ==
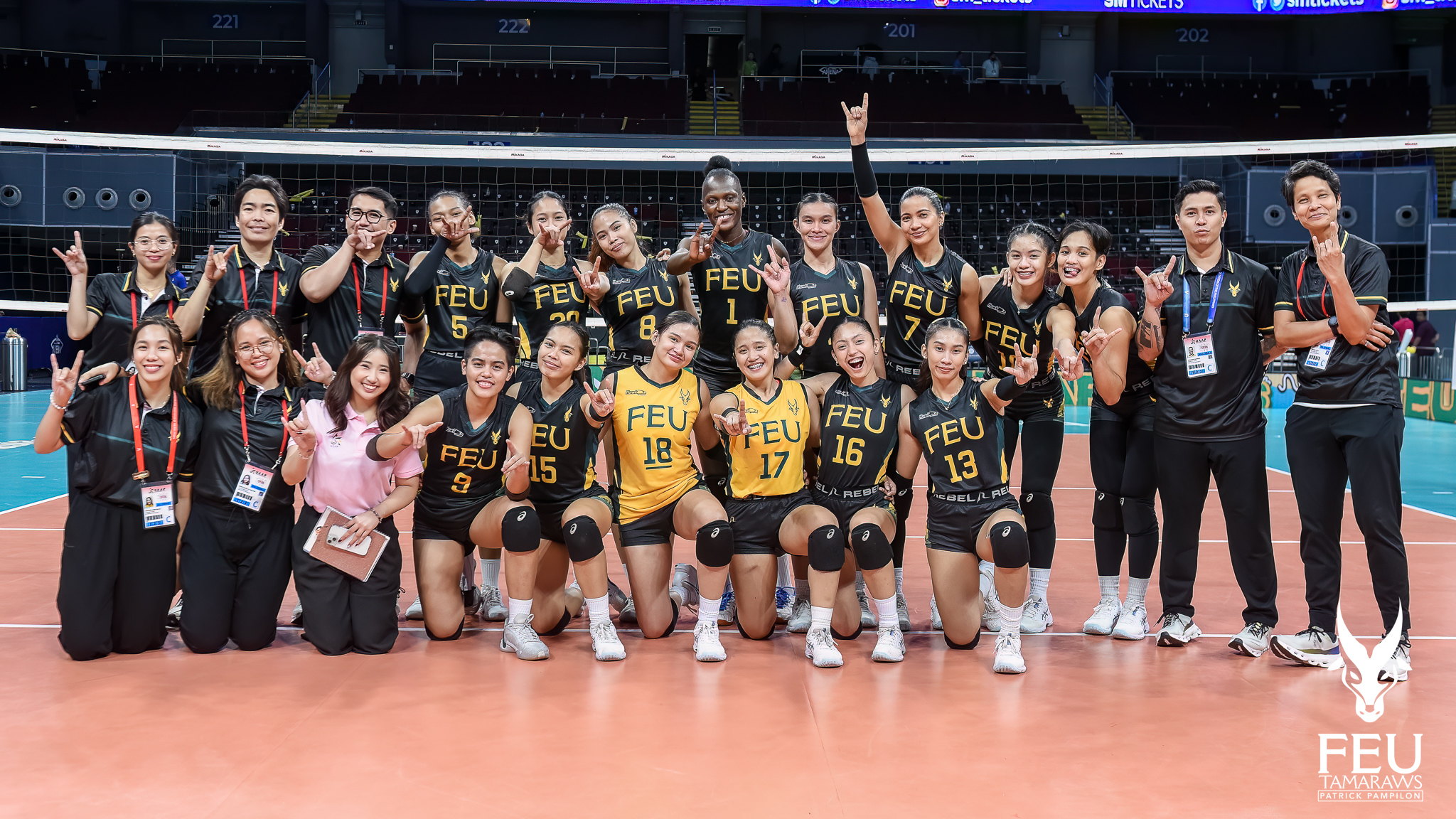
Season 86 team

The FEU Lady Tamaraws (FLT) won their first title in Season 11 (1948–49). As of UAAP Season 85, they have a total of 29 UAAP championships - the most in the league, followed by its rival UST Tigresses (16) and DLSU Lady Spikers (12).

=== Rivals with the other Green and Gold teams ===
- The rivalry between the UST Golden Tigresses and the FEU Lady Tamaraws is one of the most storied in the UAAP, with these teams battling in the championship for 15 seasons (1988–2003). Nine titles were won by the FEU Lady Tamaraws.
- The De La Salle Lady Spikers and FEU Lady Tamaraws face off for seven times (Seasons 61, 63, 64, 65, 66, 71, 80) in the UAAP finals most recently during Season 80. Adding special flavor to this rivalry is having FEU alumnus and multi-decorated coach Ramil De Jesus calling the shots for the Lady Spikers.

== Current roster ==
UAAP Season 87 roster
No.	Player	Position	Height	Birth date	Year	High School
1	Faida Bakanke	Opposite Hitter	1.85 m (6 ft 1 in)	March 27, 2002 (age 24)		
2	Melody Pons	Outside Hitter				Far Eastern University–Diliman
5	Christine Ubaldo (c)	Setter	1.73 m (5 ft 8 in)	October 17, 2002 (age 23)		Kings' Montessori School
6	Lovely Rose Lopez	Middle Blocker			1st	Far Eastern University–Diliman
8	Mitzi Panangin	Middle Blocker		April 19, 2002 (age 24)		University of Southern Philippines Foundation
9	Chenie Tagaod	Outside Hitter	1.72 m (5 ft 8 in)	January 22, 2002 (age 24)		University of San Jose-Recoletos
10	Clarisse Loresco	Middle Blocker			1st	Far Eastern University–Diliman
11	Karylle Miranda	Setter				
13	Alyzza Gaile Devosora	Opposite Hitter				
15	Gerzel Mary Petallo	Outside Hitter	1.65 m (5 ft 5 in)	September 24, 2003 (age 23)		De La Salle Santiago Zobel School
17	Margarett Louise Encarnacion	Libero				
19	Jean Asis	Middle Blocker	1.78 m (5 ft 10 in)	August 10, 2002 (age 24)		Far Eastern University–Diliman
20	Julianne Monares	Outside Hitter				Bacolod Tay Tung High School
21	Myrtle Escanlar	Outside Hitter	5 ft 6 in (1.68 m)	July 21, 2003 (age 23)		Calvary Baptist Academy of Pontevedra Inc.

== Offseason roster ==
=== SSL ===
2023 SSL Pre-Season roster
No.	Player	Position
1	Faida Bakanke	OP
4	Karyme Isabelle Truz	MB
5	Christine Ubaldo	S
6	Alexandra Maxine Juangco	L
7	Ann Roselle Asis	MB
8	Mitzi Panangin	MB
9	Chenie Tagaod	OH
10	Florize Anne Papa	OH
11	Gillianne Gallo	S
13	Alyzza Gaile Devosora	OH
14	Kiesha Dazzie Bedonia	
15	Gerzel Mary Petallo	OH
16	Marilla Issabel Alberto	S
17	Margarett Louise Encarnacion	L
18	Nikka Ann Medina (c)	OH
19	Jean Asis	MB
20	Julianne Monares	L
21	Jazlyn Anne Ellarina	OH
28	Zyra Danica Morales	OPP

=== V-League ===
2023 SSL Pre-Season roster
No.	Player	Position
1	Faida Bakanke	OP
2	Shiela Kiseo (c)	L
4	Karyme Isabelle Truz	MB
5	Christine Ubaldo	S
6	Alexandra Maxine Juangco	L
7	Ann Roselle Asis	MB
8	Mitzi Panangin	MB
9	Chenie Tagaod	OH
10	Florize Anne Papa	OH
11	Gillianne Gallo	S
12	Melody Pons	OP
13	Alyzza Gaile Devosora	OH
14	Kiesha Dazzie Bedonia	
15	Gerzel Mary Petallo	OH
16	Marilla Issabel Alberto	S
17	Margarett Louise Encarnacion	L
18	Nikka Ann Medina	OH
19	Jean Asis	MB
20	Julianne Monares	L
21	Jazlyn Anne Ellarina	OH
28	Zyra Danica Morales	OPP

=== Fixtures and results ===
==== 2023 Shakey's Super League Collegiate Tournament ====
Elimination round

M	Date	Time	Venue	Opponent	Result	Record	Set scores				
M	Date	Time	Venue	Opponent	Result	Record	1	2	3	4	5
1	Sep 18	5:00 pm PHT	Filoil EcoOil Centre	Mapúa Lady Cardinals	W 3–0	1–0	25–23	25–14	25–18	–	–
2	Sep 23	2:00 pm PHT	Filoil EcoOil Centre	EAC Lady Generals	W 3–0	2–0	25–6	25–15	25–12	–	–
3	Sep 30	2:00 pm PHT	Rizal Memorial Coliseum	Ateneo Blue Eagles	W 3–2	3–0	22–25	23–25	25–20	25–22	15–10

Quarterfinal round

M	Date	Time	Venue	Opponent	Result	Record	Set scores				
M	Date	Time	Venue	Opponent	Result	Record	1	2	3	4	5
4	Oct 14	11:00 am PHT	Rizal Memorial Coliseum	Adamson Lady Falcons	W 3–0	1–0 (4–0)	25–22	25–20	25–22	–	–
5	Oct 21	2:00 pm PHT	Rizal Memorial Coliseum	Benilde Lady Blazers	L 2–3	1–1 (4–1)	19–25	25–21	15–25	26–24	17–19
6	Oct 22	11:00 am PHT	Rizal Memorial Coliseum	UE Lady Warriors	W 3–0	2–1 (5–1)	25–23	25–17	27–25	–	–
7	Oct 28	5:00 pm PHT	Rizal Memorial Coliseum	Ateneo Blue Eagles	W 3–0	3–1 (6–1)	25–19	25–18	25–18	–	–

Semifinal round

M	Date	Time	Venue	Opponent	Result	Record	Set scores				
M	Date	Time	Venue	Opponent	Result	Record	1	2	3	4	5
8	Nov 5	2:00 pm PHT	Rizal Memorial Coliseum	NU Lady Bulldogs	L 0–3	0–1 (6–2)	13–25	24–26	20–25	–	–

Bronze medal match

M	Date	Time	Venue	Opponent	Result	Record	Set scores				
M	Date	Time	Venue	Opponent	Result	Record	1	2	3	4	5
9	Nov 10	2:00 pm PHT	Rizal Memorial Coliseum	Adamson Lady Falcons	W 3–2	1–0 (7–2)	25–20	25–19	12–25	14–25	15–12
10	Nov 11	5:00 pm PHT	Rizal Memorial Coliseum	Adamson Lady Falcons	W 3–2	2–0 (8–2)	25–18	16–25	25–15	21–21	15–7

Source: Plus Network

== Previous rosters ==
=== UAAP champions ===
UAAP Season 70 roster

FEU Lady Tamaraws
No.	Player	Position
1	April Jose	S
2	Rose Taganas	L
3	Rachel Daquis	OH
4	Shaira Gonzales	OH
5	Charmaine Sison	MB
6	Josephine Cafranca	MB
7	Wendy Semana (c)	S
8	Janine Peneranda	MB
9	Maica Morada	MB
10	Angelie Samera	L
11	Cherry Vivas	OH
12	Camille Abanto	OP
13	Marygail Tolentino	OP
14	Mary Rose Cabanag	OH

=== SVL champions ===
13th Season Collegiate roster

FEU Lady Tamaraws
No.	Player	Position
1	Christine Agno	L
2	Bernadeth Pons	OH
3	Charlemagne Simborio	OH
5	Glayssa Faith Torres	MB
6	Jonnabelle Dionela	OH
7	Geneveve Casugod	MB
8	Samantha Dawson	OP
9	Remy Palma	MB
10	Louise Papa (c)	S
11	Kyla Atienza	L
13	Mayjorie Roxas	OP
14	Rizallie Amaro	MB
18	Rachel Daquis (Guest player)	OH
20	Jovelyn Gonzaga (Guest player)	OP

== Retired jersey numbers ==
- #3 – Rachel Daquis (jersey retirement scheduled during the UAAP Season 79 women's volleyball tournament)

== Awards ==
=== Team ===
==== UAAP ====
FEU Lady Tamaraws (partial awards)
Year	Season	Title	Ref
1948	11	Champions	
1950	13	Champions	
1951	14	Champions	
1952	15	Champions	
1954	17	Champions	
1955	18	Champions	
1958	21	Champions	
1959	22	Champions	
1960	23	Champions	
1962	25	Champions	
1963	26	Champions	
1964	27	Champions	
1967	30	Champions	
1970	33	Champions	
1971	34	Champions	
1972	35	Champions	
1973	36	Champions	
1978	41	Champions	
1981	44	Champions	
1983	46	Champions	
1991	54	Champions	
1992	55	Champions	
1993	56	Runner-up	
1994	57	Champions	
1995	58	Champions	
1996	59	Runner-up	
1997	60	Runner-up	
1998	61	Champions	
2000	63	Champions	
2001	64	Champions	
2002	65	Champions	
2003	66	Runner-up	
2005	68	3rd place	
2007	69	Runner-up	
2008	70	Champions	
2009	71	Runner-up	
2016	78	3rd place	
2018	80	Runner-up	

==== SSL ====
FEU Lady Tamaraws
Year	Tournament	Placement	Ref
2023	Pre-Season	3rd Place	

==== SVL/PVL/V-LEAGUE ====
FEU Lady Tamaraws
Year	Conference	Placement	Ref
2009	2nd	3rd Place	
2014	1st	Champions	
2015	Collegiate	3rd Place	
2017	Collegiate	Runner-up	
2018	Collegiate	Runner-up	
2023	Collegiate	Runner-up	

=== Players ===
==== UAAP ====
UAAP awardees (partial lists)

FEU Lady Tamaraws (partial list)
Year	Award	Player	Ref
1998	MVP	Precilla Delos Angeles	
2000	MVP	Ailyn Ege	
2000	Rookie of the Year	Beverly Benin	
2001	MVP	Ailyn Ege	
2001	Rookie of the Year	Javier	
2002	MVP	Ailyn Ege	
2007	Rookie of the Year	Maica Morada	
2007	Best Attacker	Mary Ann Manalo	
2007	Best Server	Rachel Daquis	
2008	MVP	Wendy Semana	
2009	Best Setter	April Jose	
2009	Best Server	Maica Morada	
2010	MVP (Season); Best Scorer	Cherry Vivas	
2012	Best Scorer	Rosemarie Vargas	
2012	Best Setter	Gyzelle Sy	
2012	Best Digger	Cristine Agno	
2015	Best Digger	Cristine Agno	
2018	Best Blocker	Ced Domingo	
2023	Best Opposite Spiker	Jovelyn Fernandez	

=== SVL/PVL/V-League ===
SVL/PVL/V-League awardees

FEU Lady Tamaraws
Year	Conference	Award	Player	Ref
2009	1st	Best Server	Maica Morada	
2009	1st	Most Improved Player	Shaira Gonzalez	
2009	2nd	Best Server	Cherry Vivas	
2009	2nd	Best Setter	April Jose	
2010	2nd	Best Server	Rachel Daquis	
2014	1st	MVP (Finals)	Rachel Daquis	
2014	1st	Best Setter	Yna Louise Papa	
2014	1st	Best Receiver	Cristine Agno	
2015	Collegiate	Best Opposite Spiker	Jovelyn Gonzaga (G)	
2016	Collegiate	2nd Best Middle Blocker	Remy Palma	
2016	Collegiate	Best Opposite Spiker	Toni Basas	
2017	Collegiate	1st Best Middle Blocker	Jeanette Villareal	
2017	Collegiate	Best Opposite Spiker	Toni Basas	
2018	Collegiate	1st Best Middle Blocker	Ced Domingo	
2023	Collegiate	2nd Best Outside Spiker	Kiesha Bedonia	
2023	Collegiate	Best Setter	Tin Ubaldo	

== Season-by-season record ==
Records starting UAAP Season 56

Champion	Runner-up	Third place

FEU Lady Tamaraws season-by-season record
Year	UAAP Season	Field	Eliminations					Playoffs			Head coach	Ref.
Year	UAAP Season	Field	Finish	GP	W	L	SPR	Round	Opponent	Result	Head coach	Ref.
1993	56	8	2nd					Finals	UST Tigresses	L		
1994	57	7	1st					Finals	UST Tigresses	W		
1995	58	8	1st					Finals	UST Tigresses	W		
1996	59	8	2nd					Finals	UST Tigresses	L		
1997	60	7	2nd					Finals	UST Tigresses	L		
1998	61	8	1st					Finals	De La Salle Lady Spikers	W		
1999	62	8	3rd					Finals		L		
2000	63	8	1st					Finals	De La Salle Lady Spikers	W		
2001	64	8	1st					Finals	De La Salle Lady Spikers	W		
2002	65	8	1st					Finals	De La Salle Lady Spikers	W		
2003	66	8	2nd					Finals	De La Salle Lady Spikers	L		
2004	67	8	4th					Not held				
2005	68	8	2nd	14	8	6	3.091	1st seed playoffs Final Four	Adamson Lady Falcons #1 Adamson Lady Falcons	L 2–3; L 1–3		
2007	69	8	2nd					Finals	De La Salle Lady Spikers	L		
2008	70	8	1st					Finals		W	Nes Pamilar	
2009	71	8	2nd					Finals	UST Tigresses	L	Nes Pamilar	
2010	72	8	5th					Did not qualify			Nes Pamilar	
2011	73	8	6th	14	5	9	0.959	Did not qualify			Nes Pamilar	
2012	74	8	4th	14	8	6	1.864	Stepladder semifinals	UST Golden Tigresses	L 1–3	Nes Pamilar	
2013	75	8	6th	14	8	6	1.098	Did not qualify			Kid Santos	
2014	76	8	4th	14	12	2	1.190	Final Four		L	Shaq Delos Santos	
2015	77	8	3rd	14	8	6	1.036	Stepladder Semifinals		L	Shaq Delos Santos	
2016	78	8	5th	14	7	7	1.032	Finals		W	Shaq Delos Santos	
2017	79	8	6th	14	7	7	0.963	Final Four		L	Shaq Delos Santos	
2018	80	8	4th	14	7	7	0.955	Finals	De La Salle Lady Spikers	L	George Pascua	
2019	81	8	4th	14	9	5	1.000	Final Four	Ateneo Lady Eagles	L 1–2	George Pascua	
2020	82	Tournament cancelled										
2021	83	Tournament cancelled										
2022	84	8	8th	14	1	13	0.732	Did not qualify			George Pascua	
2023	85	8	5th	14	6	8	0.677	Did not qualify			Tina Salak	
2024	86	8	4th	14	9	5	1.052	Semifinals	NU Lady Bulldogs	L 1–2	Manolo Refugia	
2025	87	8	4th	14	9	5	1.051	Semifinals	NU Lady Bulldogs	L 0–2	Tina Salak	

== Notable alumnae ==
- Tina Salak (S)
- Gyzelle Sy (S)
- Kyle Negrito (S)
- Gel Cayuna (S)
- Wendy Semana (S)
- Kyla Atienza (L)
- Ced Domingo (MB)
- Cza Carandang (MB)
- Geneveve Casugod (MB)
- Maica Morada (MB)
- Remy Palma (MB)
- Bernadeth Pons (OH)
- Heather Guino-o (OH)
- Rachel Daquis (OH)
- Rosemarie Vargas (OH)

Legend
S	Setter
L	Libero
MB	Middle Blocker
OS	Outside Hitter
OP	Opposite Hitter

== See also ==
- FEU Baby Tamaraws
- FEU Tamaraws volleyball
- Shakey's Super League
