= Nes Pamilar =

Filipino volleyball coach (1966–2019)

Personal information
- Nationality: Filipino
- Born: Ernesto Pamilar; July 23, 1966
- Died: January 12, 2019 (aged 52); Quezon City, Philippines
- Education: FEU

Coaching information
Previous teams coached
Years	Teams
1989–?; 1990s–2000s; 2000s–2011; 2013; 2016; 2016–2017; 2017–2019; 2018	Ateneo Blue Eaglets; Letran Knights (men and women); FEU Tamaraws (men and women); Philippines (women); De La Salle Green Spikers; Power Smashers; San Beda Red Spikers; Tacloban Fighting Warays

Ernesto Pamilar (July 23, 1966 – January 12, 2019) was a Filipino volleyball player and coach.

== Early life and education ==
Ernesto Pamilar was born on July 23, 1966. He studied at the Far Eastern University from elementary to the college level.

== Playing career ==
Pamilar was a player for the FEU Tamaraws helping his college win two titles in the University Athletic Association of the Philippines (UAAP).

== Coaching career ==
Pamilar was mentored under coach Kid Santos. He started coaching with Ateneo High School in 1989.

He was part of the Colegio de San Juan de Letran volleyball program which played in the National Collegiate Athletic Association (NCAA). He ended the 12-year title drought of the Letran Lady Spikers by winning the 1997 championship. Overall, he won one title for the Letran Spikers men's team, and three for the Lady Spikers. His stint with Letran lasted around the 2000s.

Pamilar helped the FEU Lady Tamaraws won the women's volleyball title for UAAP Season 70 in 2009 Pamilar is credited for developing Rachel Anne Daquis who was part of the Season 70 winning squad. He left FEU around 2011 due to undisclosed unfavorable reasons.

He was also involved the formation and coaching of the Cagayan Valley volleyball teams in the 2010s. He led the Cagayan Valley Lady Rising Suns in the Shakey's V-League. He helped the Lady Rising Suns win the 2013 Open Conference title.

Pamilar was the head coach of the Philippines women's national team which took part at the 2013 Asian Women's Volleyball Championship.

Pamilar coached the De La Salle Green Spikers men's team in the 2016 Spikers' Turf Collegiate Conference.

The Laoag Power Smashers had Pamilar as their coach for the 2016 Shakey's V-League. He remained coach when they moved to the Premier Volleyball League (PVL) and became simply known as the Power Smashers.

In 2017, Pamilar was appointed as coach of the San Beda Red Spikers in the NCAA. He also became concurrent coach of the Tacloban Fighting Warays which joined the PVL in early 2018.

He was coach of San Beda at the time of his death.

== Illness and death ==
Pamilar was diagnosed with a clogged artery in 2017 and underwent a bypass surgery in November of the same year. He recovered and returned to coaching. He was rushed to the Philippine Heart Center in Quezon City on January 12, 2019 but was declared dead. He died due to sepsis or heart failure.

== Personal life ==
Pamilar was married to a woman named Bing, with whom he had four children.
