= UP–UST rivalry =

Rivalry between the two teams

UP–UST men's basketball rivalry
- UP Fighting Maroons UST Growling Tigers
- Other names: Battle of the Church and State (simply Church vs State)
- Sport: Men's basketball
- Latest meeting: October 21, 2026 (SM Mall of Asia Arena); UP, 103–101

Statistics
- All-time record: UAAP Final Four appearances: UP 5; UST 16; Titles: UP (7): NCAA 4, UAAP 3; UST (19): NCAA 1, UAAP 18
- Longest win streak: UST, 19 (2007–2016)
- Current win streak: UP, 12 (2022–present)

Locations of UST and UP

The UP–UST rivalry is a team rivalry between the athletic teams of the University of the Philippines (UP) and the University of Santo Tomas (UST) in the University Athletic Association of the Philippines (UAAP).

The matchup, in many occasions, is called "Church vs State" or "Battle of the Church and State", because UST is a pontifical university, is run by the Catholic Order of Preachers, and labels itself as "The Catholic University of the Philippines", while UP is run by the Philippine government, is seen as the Philippines' de facto national university, and is the only public university in the UAAP. The rivalry became popular in the UAAP Cheerdance Competition in the late 1990s to 2000s between the UP Pep Squad and the UST Salinggawi Dance Troupe. Both schools placed in the competition annually from 1999 to 2008 - the longest joint podium finishes by cheerdance teams in UAAP history. In 2012, 16 out of the 18 UAAP Cheerdance titles were won by either UP or UST. In UAAP Season 82 in 2019, it gained a renewed prominence when the UP Fighting Maroons and the UST Growling Tigers men's basketball teams played each other four times in the season. The basketball games with the highest attendance in 2019 had either UP or UST in it.

== Cheerdance ==
The UST Salinggawi Dance Troupe won the first three Cheering Competition titles from 1994 to 1996. The UP Filipiniana Dance Group was sent as UP's representative during the early years of the competition. In 2001, the UP Pep Squad matched UST's record of winning three consecutive titles. UST achieved a rare 5-peat championship from 2002 to 2006, while UP placed constantly placed as runners-up. From 2007 to 2012, UP became champions five out of six times.

=== Early years ===
UST won the first UAAP Cheering Competition on August 13, 1994, the same year that the UP Pep Squad was founded. The competition was held at the Cuneta Astrodome. UST's contingent was composed of Salinggawi, a cheerleading class, and head cheerers.

Salinggawi won the same competition the following year with a flawless performance and more difficult stunts.

In 1996, UST achieved its first 3-peat championship in the third Jollibee "Chi-cheer Kayo" Challenge. UST focused on the creative stunts more than the traditional elements. Salinggawi's routine included its signature Spider Pyramid to score 91.70%. UP finished second with 88.86. UP, together with DLSU, complained about the deductions. Three-point deductions were given to the top three teams, UST, UP, and DLSU, for not performing in the order of performance.

The UP Pep Squad, under coach Lalaine Pereña, earned its first title in 1999.

=== 2000s ===
Both UP and UST became trendsetters and claimed many firsts in the competition. UP claimed to be the first to adopt an overall theme in the routine. UST is also said to be the first to use canned music and to eliminate the classic pompoms.

In 2002, Salinggawi won and averted the UP Pep Squad from getting their fourth consecutive championship. Ryan Silva, UST's new choreographer, used a medley of movie soundtracks from Bring It On, Blade, and Joy Ride to execute the sky-diving and scorpion-like floor maneuvers. UP asserted their creativity and uniqueness by incorporating tap dance and jump ropes to their routine, which was still devoid of canned music. Salinggawi finished first with 87.38%, while UP Pep Squad obtained 84% for a third-place finish.

The following year, UST retained the title with their rhythmic and fast-paced modern and ballet dances. Salinggawi used local hits such as Mr. Suave and Legs, and soundtracks from Charlie's Angels and Tomb Raider. UST finished with 89.50%, while UP came in second place with 88.16%. UP Pep used canned music for the first time in their high difficulty sports aerobics and Filipiniana-influenced routine.

Salinggawi achieved a 3-peat in 2004. The group danced to the tunes of the late 1990s. Among the highlights of UST's routine were the inclusion of Capoiera and the Helicopter toss stunt. UST finished with 93.61%, while UP ranked second with 90.56%. UP Pep Squad showcased a "back-to-basics cheerleading" routine.

UST's fifth straight championship made them the winningest team in 2006. Salinggawi's routine included "Spiderman walk" and "Superman lift" to score 94.96% and defeat UP Pep Squad's capoeira-inspired routine. UP slipped to third place at 91.7%.

In 2007, a rock-themed UP Pep Squad dethroned Salinggawi, which sported a bumblebee-inspired routine. UP garnered an over-all score of 92.66%, beating UST by just 0.5 points. After the announcement of UP's win, the members of Salinggawi approached and warmly congratulated their rivals.

=== 2010s ===
In 2012, UP Pep Squad tied Salinggawi's eight titles with their "Freedom" routine. All of the members of the UP Pep Squad shaved their heads for their performance.

==== UP's protest in 2016 ====
In 2016, the UP Pep Squad decided to skip the UAAP Season 79 Cheerdance Competition. The UP Pep Squad contested the previous year's results, saying that the competition criteria during the UAAP Season 78 Cheerdance Competition were not followed. During that season, UP finished third in the contest and filed a protest with head coach Lala Pereña saying the judges displayed prejudice toward her team.

=== Results ===
Team ╲ Year	1994	1995	1996	1997	1998	1999	2000	2001	2002	2003	2004	2005	2006	2007	2008	2009	2010	2011	2012	2013	2014	2015	2016	2017	2018	2019	2020	2021	2022	2023	2024	2025
UP	?	3	2	C	3	1	1	1	3	2	2	2	3	1	1	3	1	1	1	2	2	3	X	6	6	6	C	6	6	5	6	6
UST	1	1	1	C	X	2	2	3	1	1	1	1	1	2	2	4	3	4	4	7	3	2	4	2	4	4	C	4	3	3	5	5

= Champion; = Runner-up; = Third place; C = Competition cancelled; X = Did not join

Team	Last championship	Last top 3 appearance	Rank among 8 competing schools								Podium finishes
Team	Last championship	Last top 3 appearance	1st place, gold medalist(s)	2nd place, silver medalist(s)	3rd place, bronze medalist(s)	4	5	6	7	8	Podium finishes
UP Pep Squad	2012	2015	8	6	6		1	6			20
UST Salinggawi Dance Troupe	2006	2023	8	6	5	6	2		1		19

=== UAAP halftime performances ===
Season	Date	UP	UST
Season 75	September 8, 2012		UST Yellow Jackets
Season 78	September 13, 2015	UP Pep Squad; Theme: Yoga	
Season 78	October 25, 2015		UST Salinggawi Troupe Dance Troupe; Theme: "Umaaraw, Umuulan" and parts of the 2015 UAAP Cheerdance routine.
Season 80	September 10, 2017	UP Pep Squad	UST ensemble: UST Salinggawi Troupe Dance Troupe (Dance), UST Sinag Ballroom Dance Company, UST Prime, UST Salinggawi Dance Troupe (Cheer), UST Yellow Jackets; Theme: "Eye of the Tiger"
Season 81	November 10, 2018	UP Pep Squad alumni	
Season 82	September 7, 2019	UP ensemble	UST Salinggawi Troupe Dance Troupe (Cheer). First performance of the team

== Men's basketball ==
=== 2016–2018 ===
In 2016, the UP Fighting Maroons defeated the UST Growling Tigers after 10 years or 19 games in a Maroon-packed Filoil Flying V Centre in San Juan. UP, with a new coach, Bo Perasol, dominated the match and held a game-high 15-point lead at the start of the fourth quarter. Paul Desiderio led the Maroons with 16 points. The Maroons won 5 games in 2016, their most wins since 2006.

In the first round of 2017, UST almost had the victory after Marvin Lee gave the Tigers a 2-point advantage. UP's Paul Desiderio, who previously struggled at the 3-point line, shouted during the final time-out, "Atin 'to, papasok 'to." He hit the game-winning triple with 1.1 seconds remaining and led the Maroons with 17 points. "Atin 'to!" became UP's battle cry for years to come.

After the game, UST's The Varsitarian posted on Twitter, "UP grabbed only its second win against the Tigers in 12 years. #UAAPSeason80". UP's The Philippine Collegian responded, "Remedies to sorrow, by St. Thomas Aquinas: the truth, sympathy of friends, crying, sleeping, a nice bath. #UAAPSeason80 #UPFight #taaskamao"

For the first time since 2006, UP swept the 2-game series against UST. Janjan Jaboneta made all his 4 3-pointers to lead the Maroons with 12 points in the second-round game. UP finished the season in fifth place, while UST took the last.

With a new coach, Aldin Ayo, UST ended the 3-game winning streak of UP in the 2018 season. Rookie CJ Cansino's high percentage shooting led the Tigers to win the first round. The Tigers put up more points in the first quarter (31 points) than the Maroons did in the entire first half (29 points). UST had a 30-point advantage in the third quarter, 71–41.

In the second-round game, CJ Cansino sustained a season-ending injury to his left knee. Bright Akhuetie, eventual Most Valuable Player of UAAP Season 81, posted a double-double of 25 points and 18 rebounds to beat UST, while UP team captain Paul Desiderio had 19 points. UP's win eliminated UST from the final four contention. The UP Fighting Maroons eventually made it to the final four for the first time in 21 years, and to the finals after 32 years.

=== 2019 ===
Season 82 Attendance
Game	Venue	Attendance
Round 1	Smart Araneta Coliseum	12,033
Round 2	Mall of Asia Arena	
Semifinals 1	Smart Araneta Coliseum	17,772
Semifinals 2	Mall of Asia Arena	18,548

In the round 1 match-up, 2018's sixth-place UST won against the playoffs favorite UP. The Tigers were bannered by rookies and eventual season's Most Valuable Player and Rookie of the Year, Soulémane Chabi Yo and Mark Nonoy respectively. UST capitalized on UP rookie Kobe Paras' absence, an eventual season Mythical 5 member, to win. In the round 2 match-up, UST made a team record of 16 3-pointers, the most by any team that year, to sweep UP in Season 82. Kobe Paras sustained a shoulder injury early in the game, but still led the Maroons in scoring. Stalwart rookie Rhenz Abando, who averaged 11.8 ppg, was benched by UST head coach Aldin Ayo.

For the first time in 23 years, the two teams met in the post-season. The excitement for the semifinals match reached the Supreme Court of the Philippines. Chief Justice Diosdado Peralta, a UST Faculty of Civil Law alumnus predicted in jest a UST victory, commenting in a press conference, "Wala namang laban yung UP, eh. (UP doesn't stand a chance.)" Associate Justice and former UP College of Law dean Marvic Leonen responded on Twitter saying, "I am confident that the true facts of this controversy will be proven without a shadow of the doubt within the next few days. #UPFight" Chief Public Information Officer Brian Hosaka, concluded the press conference saying, "That concludes our program. The Chief Justice expects a UST–Ateneo finals."

In the Game 1 of the semifinals, UST had an early double-digit lead and stayed in control throughout the game. Rhenz Abando and Soulémane Chabi Yo hit 17 points each. Maroon Juan Gomez de Liano scored 20 points in the second half, but Tigers Sherwin Concepcion and Mark Nonoy made key 3-pointers in the last minutes. In Game 2, the Tigers had a dismal shooting and just went 7-of-39 from the 3-point line. Kobe Paras pulled off a dunk at 1:53 minute to give UP a 4-point lead, 65–61. At 23.6 seconds to go, UST's Renzo Subido hit a 3-pointer to get the lead, 66–65. Soulémane Chabi Yo made the last 2 points from the free throw line, sealing the win for UST.

It is interesting to note that Renzo Subido is the son of former UP Fighting Maroon, Henry Subido. The elder Subido played alongside Kobe Paras' father, Benjie Paras, in the 1986 UP champion team.

Among the personalities who watched the games were senators Richard Gordon and Joel Villanueva, UP and UST alumni respectively, UST Medicine alumni Hayden Kho and Vicki Belo (also a UP alumna), media personalities and Thomasians Arnold Clavio and Doland Castro, actor and UP alumnus Richard Gomez and daughter UP freshman, Juliana Gomez, and politician and UP alumnus Gilbert Remulla. GMA News reporters and Thomasians Jun Veneracion, Sandra Aguinaldo, and Cesar Apolinario showed their support in social media. Four-year-old Scarlet Snow Belo, the daughter of Vicki Belo and Hayden Kho, celebrated the UST victory by chanting “Go USTe” on her Instagram.

UST's The Varsitarian reposted the 2-year-old tweet of UP's The Philippine Collegian, "Remedies to sorrow, by St. Thomas Aquinas: the truth, sympathy of friends, crying, sleeping, a nice bath. #UAAPSeason80 #UPFight #taaskamao", as a clapback.

Shortly after the game, the UST Conservatory of Music Brass Band, led by Dean Antonio Africa, held a small parade that set off from the Albertus Magnus Building to the UST Main Building.

=== 2020–2021 ===
On August 21, 2020, UP head coach Bo Perasol confirmed that the UAAP Season 82 UST Growling Tigers captain, CJ Cansino transferred to the UP Fighting Maroons. Cansino was the Juniors MVP in 2017 from UST Junior High School. He placed second in the Seniors Division's Rookie of the Year race behind Ateneo's Ivorian center Angelo Kouame in 2018.

On June 10, 2021, UP Integrated School (UPIS) Junior Maroons Jordi Gómez de Liaño announced his commitment to the UST Growling Tigers. He is the younger brother of Joe, who was a member of the Tigers training pool, and Juan and Javier, who are UP Fighting Maroons and national team standouts. He averaged 13 points, 4.1 rebounds, and 1.8 assists per game for the Junior Maroons in UAAP Season 82 and was part of the Gilas Pilipinas Youth pool for the canceled 2019 FIBA Under-16 Asian Championship.

=== Results ===
The two teams play annual and regularly scheduled tournaments since the establishment of National Collegiate Athletic Association in 1924. Their meetings were carried on to the UAAP, which was formed in 1938. The two teams faced each other at least once annually until 1951.

To date, both teams play each other twice in regular season.

==== Pre-Final Four era ====
UP victories	UST victories

No.	Date	Location	Winner	Score	Ref.
1	August 12, 1987	Rizal Memorial Coliseum	UP	97–92	
2	September 20, 1987	Rizal Memorial Coliseum	UP	92–83	
3	July 30, 1988	Rizal Memorial Coliseum	UP	89–74	
4	September 10, 1988	Rizal Memorial Coliseum	UP	99–77	
5	August 13, 1989	Rizal Memorial Coliseum	UP	123–81	
6	1989		UP	1–0	
7	August 26, 1990		UST	1–0	
8	September 8, 1990	Rizal Memorial Coliseum	UP	75–66	
9	August 17, 1991		UP	1–0	
10	September 21, 1991		UST	1–0	
11	July 18, 1992	Araneta Coliseum	UST	66–58	
12	September 17, 1992	Loyola Center	UST	83–73	
(*) = finals games; (^) = semifinals; (≠) = seeding playoffs

==== Final Four era ====
UP victories	UST victories

No.	Date	Location	Winner	Score	Ref.
1	August 10, 1993	Loyola Center	UST	87–76	
2	August 29, 1993	Loyola Center	UST	93–61	
3	July 23, 1994	Loyola Center	UST	82–72	
4	August 20, 1994	Loyola Center	UST	95–91	
5	July 30, 1995	Loyola Center	UST	69–59	
6	August 19, 1995	Loyola Center	UST	82–61	
7	July 28, 1996	Rizal Memorial Coliseum	UST	91–71	
8	September 15, 1996	Rizal Memorial Coliseum	UST	72–71	
9	September 28, 1996^	Araneta Coliseum	UST	63–56	
10	July 12, 1997	Araneta Coliseum	UP	63–56	
11	September 27, 1997	Araneta Coliseum	UST	78–74	
12	August 15, 1998	Loyola Center	UP	64–62	
13	September 5, 1998	Ninoy Aquino Stadium	UP	80–78	
14	September 28, 1998≠	Ninoy Aquino Stadium	#4 UST	80–72	
15	July 31, 1999	Cuneta Astrodome	UST	80–66	
16	August 18, 1999	Loyola Center	UST	77–62	
17	July 30, 2000	Ninoy Aquino Stadium	UST	49–45	
18	August 19, 2000	Rizal Memorial Coliseum	UST	75–72^{OT}	
19	August 9, 2001	Loyola Center	UST	71–65	
20	September 1, 2001	Loyola Center	UST	58–56	
21	July 25, 2002	Rizal Memorial Coliseum	UST	92–75	
22	September 8, 2002	Rizal Memorial Coliseum	UST	89–83	
23	August 7, 2003	Araneta Coliseum	UP	73–55	
24	September 18, 2003	Araneta Coliseum	UST	92–89^{OT}	
25	July 22, 2004	Araneta Coliseum	UST	81–77	
26	August 12, 2004	Araneta Coliseum	UP	79–74	
27	July 9, 2005	Araneta Coliseum	UP	69–66	
28	August 14, 2005	Araneta Coliseum	UST	92–85	
29	July 9, 2006	Ninoy Aquino Stadium	UP	94–92	
30	August 31, 2006	Ninoy Aquino Stadium	UP	70–67	
31	July 21, 2007	Ninoy Aquino Stadium	UST	76–68	
32	September 2, 2007	Araneta Coliseum	UST	77–61	
33	July 12, 2008	PhilSports Arena	UST	94–75	
34	September 6, 2008	Araneta Coliseum	UST	71–63	
35	August 8, 2009	Araneta Coliseum	UST	95–85	
36	August 20, 2009	Araneta Coliseum	UST	93–88	
37	July 22, 2010	Araneta Coliseum	UST	87–81^{OT}	

No.	Date	Location	Winner	Score	Ref.
38	August 28, 2010	Araneta Coliseum	UST	68–66	
39	August 7, 2011	Araneta Coliseum	UST	68–49	
40	August 14, 2011	Araneta Coliseum	UST	77–70	
41	August 15, 2012	Smart Araneta Coliseum	UST	68–58	
42	September 8, 2012	SM Mall of Asia Arena	UST	75–68	
43	July 24, 2013	Smart Araneta Coliseum	UST	79–69	
44	September 7, 2013	SM Mall of Asia Arena	UST	63–39	
45	August 2, 2014	Smart Araneta Coliseum	UST	73–57	
46	August 27, 2014	SM Mall of Asia Arena	UST	77–65	
47	September 13, 2015	SM Mall of Asia Arena	UST	67–59	
48	October 25, 2015	SM Mall of Asia Arena	UST	83–76	
49	September 17, 2016	Smart Araneta Coliseum	UST	83–77	
50	November 6, 2016	Filoil Flying V Centre	UP	74–69	
51	September 10, 2017	SM Mall of Asia Arena	UP	74–73	
52	October 11, 2017	Smart Araneta Coliseum	UP	71–69	
53	October 10, 2018	SM Mall of Asia Arena	UST	86–72	
54	November 10, 2018	Smart Araneta Coliseum	UP	83–69	
55	September 7, 2019	Smart Araneta Coliseum	UST	85–69	
56	October 16, 2019	SM Mall of Asia Arena	UST	84–78	
57	November 10, 2019^	Smart Araneta Coliseum	UST	89–69	
58	November 13, 2019^	SM Mall of Asia Arena	UST	68–65	
59	March 29, 2022	SM Mall of Asia Arena	UP	98–82	
60	April 28, 2022	Mall of Asia Arena	UP	96–67	
61	October 22, 2022	Ynares Center	UP	76–51	
62	November 23, 2022	SM Mall of Asia Arena	UP	78–60	
63	October 14, 2023	Mall of Asia Arena	UP	110–79	
64	November 15, 2023	SM Mall of Asia Arena	UP	86–61	
65	October 2, 2024	Smart Araneta Coliseum	UP	81–70	
66	October 13, 2024	Smart Araneta Coliseum	UP	83–73	
67	November 30, 2024^	Smart Araneta Coliseum	UP	78–69	
68	September 21, 2025	Quadricentennial Pavilion	UST	87–67	
69	November 5, 2025	SM Mall of Asia Arena	UP	89–88	
70	December 3, 2025^	Smart Araneta Coliseum	UP	82–81	
71	September 13, 2026	Smart Araneta Coliseum	UP	92–85	
72	October 21, 2026	SM Mall of Asia Arena	UP	103–101^{OT}	
Series: UST leads 47–25
(*) = finals games; (^) = semifinals; (≠) = seeding playoffs

=== Offseason meetings ===
UP victories	UST victories

No.	Date	Location	Winner	Score	Tournament
1	November 4, 2006	Philsports Arena	UST	66–48	2006 Filoil Flying V Homegrown Invitational Cup
2	May 5, 2007	FEU Gym	UP	78–70	2007 Nike Summer League
3	May 25, 2007	The Arena in San Juan	UP	71–69	2007 Filoil Flying V Preseason Invitational Cup
4	May 14, 2009	FEU Gym	UP	71–62	2009 Nike Summer League
5	June 2, 2012	Filoil Flying V Arena	UST	77–70	2012 Filoil Flying V Preseason Hanes Cup
6	May 20, 2015	Filoil Flying V Arena	UST	76–72	2015 Filoil Flying V Preseason Hanes Cup
7	March 19, 2017	Baliwag Star Arena, Bulacan	UP	78–68	2017 Republica Cup–College Division
8	April 9, 2017*	Malolos Sports & Convention Center	UP	100–91	2017 Republica Cup–College Division
9	February 23, 2019	Trinity University of Asia Gym	UP	92–66	2019 MILCU x Got Skills Hard to Guard tournament
10	June 7, 2019	Filoil Flying V Centre	UP	89–72	2019 Filoil Flying V Preseason Premier Cup
11	June 23, 2019	Moro Lorenzo Gym	UP	64–55	2019 Breakdown Basketball Invitational
(*) = finals games; (^) = semifinals

== Volleyball ==
=== Men's Volleyball ===
UP and UST competed at the UAAP Men's Volleyball finals in Season 71.

UP victories	UST victories

No.	Date	Location	Winner	Score	Ref.
1	2007		UP	1–0	
2	2007		UP	1–0	
3	February 11, 2007^	Ateneo Blue Eagle Gym	UST	3–1	
4	February 14, 2007^	Ateneo Blue Eagle Gym	UP	3–1	
5	2008		UST	1–0	
6	2008		UST	1–0	
7	2009		UST	1–0	
8	2009		UST	1–0	
9	March 1, 2009*	The Arena in San Juan	UST	3–0	
10	March 4, 2009*	The Arena in San Juan	UST	3–0	
11	2010		UST	1–0	
12	2010		UST	1–0	
13	2011		UST	3–0	
14	2011		UST	3–0	
15	2012		UST	3–2	
16	2012		UST	3–1	
17	2013		UP	3–1	
18	2013		UST	3–1	
19	2014		UP	3–1	
20	2014		UST	3–0	

No.	Date	Location	Winner	Score	Ref.
21	2015		UST	3–0	
22	2015		UST	3–0	
23	2016		UP	3–1	
24	2016		UP	3–0	
25	2017		UP	3–2	
26	2017		UST	3–2	
27	2018		UP	3–2	
28	2018		UP	3–0	
29	April 24, 2019	Filoil Flying V Arena	UST	3–1	
30	2019		UST	3–1	
31	2023		UST	3–0	
32	April 30, 2023	Filoil EcoOil Centre	UST	3–1	
33	March 13, 2024	Mall of Asia Arena	UST	3–0	
34	April 10, 2024	Mall of Asia Arena	UST	3–0	
35	March 5, 2025	Mall of Asia Arena	UST	3–0	
36	April 23, 2025	Mall of Asia Arena	UST	3–0	
37	March 11, 2026	Mall of Asia Arena	UST	3–0	
38	April 20, 2026	Mall of Asia Arena	UST	3–0	
Series: UST leads 28–10
(*) = finals games; (^) = semifinals; (≠) = seeding playoffs

=== Women's Volleyball ===
UP victories	UST victories

No.	Date	Location	Winner	Score	Ref.
1	July 29, 1993		UST	3–0	
2	September 4, 1993		UST	3–0	
3	August 13, 1994		UST	3–0	
4	September 3, 1994		UST	3–0	
5	1995		UST	1–0	
6	1995		UST	1–0	
7	August 3, 1996		UST	3–0	
8	August 4, 1996		UST	3–0	
9	1997		UST	1–0	
10	1997		UST	1–0	
11	1998		UST	1–0	
12	1998		UST	1–0	
13	1999		UST	1–0	
14	1999		UST	1–0	
15	2000		UST	1–0	
16	2000		UST	1–0	
17	2001		UST	1–0	
18	2001		UST	1–0	
19	2002		UST	1–0	
20	2002		UST	1–0	
21	2003		UST	1–0	
22	2003		UST	1–0	
23	2004		UST	1–0	
24	2004		UST	1–0	
25	July 25, 2005		UST	3–1	
26	September 5, 2005		UST	3–1	
27	2006		UP	3–2	
28	2006		UST	3–0	
29	2007		UST	1–0	
30	2007		UST	1–0	
31	2008		UST	1–0	
32	2008		UST	1–0	
33	2009		UP	1–0	

No.	Date	Location	Winner	Score	Ref.
34	2009		UST	1–0	
35	2010		UST	3–0	
36	2010		UST	3–1	
37	2011		UST	3–0	
38	2011		UP	3–2	
39	2012		UST	3–1	
40	2012		UST	3–0	
41	2013		UST	3–0	
42	2013		UST	3–1	
43	December 4, 2013	Filoil Flying V Arena	UST	3–1	
44	January 26, 2014	Filoil Flying V Arena	UST	3–0	
45	December 4, 2014	Filoil Flying V Arena	UP	3–1	
46	February 14, 2015	Filoil Flying V Arena	UP	3–2	
47	February 28, 2016	Filoil Flying V Arena	UP	3–1	
48	April 10, 2016	Mall of Asia Arena	UP	3–1	
49	February 19, 2017	Filoil Flying V Arena	UP	3–1	
50	April 2, 2017	Mall of Asia Arena	UST	3–0	
51	February 28, 2018	Filoil Flying V Arena	UP	3–1	
52	March 17, 2018	Filoil Flying V Arena	UST	3–1	
53	February 24, 2019	Filoil EcoOil Centre	UST	3–1	
54	April 10, 2019	Filoil EcoOil Centre	UST	3–0	
55	May 10, 2022	Mall of Asia Arena	UP	3–1	
56	June 9, 2022	Mall of Asia Arena	UST	3–1	
57	March 11, 2023	Mall of Asia Arena	UST	3–0	
58	April 2, 2023	Mall of Asia Arena	UST	3–2	
59	March 13, 2024	Mall of Asia Arena	UST	3–0	
60	April 10, 2024	Mall of Asia Arena	UST	3–1	
61	March 5, 2025	Mall of Asia Arena	UST	3–1	
62	April 23, 2025	Mall of Asia Arena	UST	3–0	
63	March 11, 2026	Mall of Asia Arena	UST	3–1	
64	April 20, 2026	Mall of Asia Arena	UST	3–1	
Series: UST leads 54–10
(*) = finals games; (^) = semifinals; (≠) = seeding playoffs

== Friendship ==
A UP–UST Friendship Facebook page went online after the 2010 UAAP Cheerdance Competition when the UST Salinggawi Dance Troupe rejoined the UP Pep Squad in the podium finish. The page gained almost 11,000 followers, who are mostly students and alumni of UP and UST, five days after the competition.

In 2011, UST paid tribute to UST High School alumnus and then UP System President Alfredo Pascual by hosting a testimonial dinner at the UST campus. The banquet, arranged at the UST Quadricentennial Park, was attended by a rare collaboration between UST Singers and UP Madrigal Singers. UST, which already owned metal sculptures that consisted of the letters U, S, and T in black and gold, gave UP complementing letter sculptures in maroon and green colors. After nine years, the UST sculpture is installed at the UST Plaza Mayor, while the UP sculpture can still be seen at the UP Sunken Garden.

== See also ==
- Ateneo–La Salle rivalry
- UP–La Salle rivalry
- La Salle–UST rivalry
- Battle of the East
- Battle of Katipunan
