= Jessie Lopez =

Filipino volleyball player

Personal information
- Nationality: Filipino
- Born: March 29, 1986 (age 40)
- Home town: Lipa City, Batangas, Philippines
- Education: Far Eastern University
- Height: 1.75 m (5 ft 9 in)

Volleyball information
- Position: Assistant coach
- Current club: Choco Mucho Flying Titans

National team
- Years: Team
- 2009–2021: Philippines
Honours
Men's volleyball
Representing Philippines
Southeast Asian Games
Silver medal – second place	2019 Manila	Team

Jessie Lopez (born March 29, 1986) is a Filipino volleyball player. He played with FEU Tamaraws collegiate men's collegiate volleyball team. He is currently serving as an assistant coach for the Choco Mucho Flying Titans in the Premier Volleyball League (PVL).

== Career ==
=== Collegiate ===
Lopez played for FEU Tamaraws in the UAAP as a setter.

In UAAP Season 69, he was awarded as Best Server. His team also won the championship after beating UP Fighting Maroons in Game 2 of best-of-three finals series.

In UAAP Season 70, they got 13–1 win-loss record in the preliminary round tied with UST Golden Tigers. They won against UP Fighting Maroons in the Semis but they lost against UST Golden Tigers in the finals.

=== PH men's national volleyball team ===
In 2019, he became part of the Philippines men's national volleyball team in the Southeast Asian Games where they finished silver medal.

== Clubs ==
As a player

Club	From	To	Ref
PLDT Home TVolution–Air Force Power Attackers; Philippine Air Force Air Spikers	2014	2023	

As a coach

Club	Position	From	To	Ref
Choco Mucho Flying Titans	Assistant coach	2023	–	

== Awards ==
=== Individual ===
Year	League	Season/Conference	Award	Ref
2007	UAAP	69	Best Server	
2008	UAAP	70	Best Setter	
2014	PSL	All-Filipino	Best Setter	
2015	Spikers' Turf	Open	Best Setter	
2016	Spikers' Turf	Open	Best Setter	
2016	Spikers' Turf	Reinforced	Best Setter	

=== Clubs ===
Year	League	Season/Conference	Club	Title	Ref
2014	PSL	All-Filipino	PLDT Home TVolution Power Attackers	Champion	
2014	PSL	Grand Prix	PLDT Home TVolution Power Attackers	Runner-up	
2015	Spikers' Turf	Reinforced	Philippine Air Force Air Spikers	Runner-up	
2016	Spikers' Turf	Open	Philippine Air Force Air Spikers	Champions	
2016	Spikers' Turf	Reinforced	Philippine Air Force Air Spikers	Champions	
2017	PVL	Reinforced	Philippine Air Force Air Spikers	Runner-up	
2017	PVL	Open	Philippine Air Force Air Spikers	3rd place	
2018	PVL	Reinforced	Philippine Air Force Air Spikers	Champions	
2018	Spikers' Turf	Open	Philippine Air Force Air Spikers	Champions	
2019	Spikers' Turf	Reinforced	Philippine Air Force Air Spikers	Runner-up	
2019	Spikers' Turf	Open	Philippine Air Force Air Spikers	Runner-up	
2021	PNVF	Champions League	Philippine Air Force Air Spikers	Runner-up	
