= Kid Santos =

Filipino volleyball coach

Personal information
- Full name: Florentino Santos
- Nationality: Filipino
- Born: 1949 or 1950
- Died: November 8, 2017 (aged 67)
- Education: Far Eastern University

Coaching information
Previous teams coached
Teams
FEU Tamaraws; FEU Lady Tamaraws

Florentino "Kid" Santos was a Filipino volleyball coach who was part of the FEU Tamaraws volleyball program.

== Playing career ==
Kid Santos was a player for the FEU Tamaraws. He also played for the Philippine national team.

== Coaching career ==
Santos is regarded as a "legendary" coach who has mentored both the men's and women's volleyball teams of the Far Eastern University (FEU). 54 championships is credited to Santos. The FEU Lady Tamaraws won 19 of its 29 titles in the University Athletic Association of the Philippines under Santos.

Among his apprentices in coaching include George Pascua, Ramil de Jesus, and Shaq Delos Santos.

Santos served as FEU's volleyball program head at the time of his death.

== Personal life ==
Santos had a wife with whom he had three children. His children grew up to be volleyball coaches.

He was also Roman Catholic and served as a lay minister at the Santisima Trinidad Parish in Manila for at least 20 years. He died on November 8, 2017 due to cardiac arrest.
