= UAAP Season 70 judo championships =

Judo

The Judo championships of UAAP Season 70 was contested from October 6 to October 7, 2007, at the Ateneo Blue Eagle Gym. There were three titles given, one for each division: Men's, women's, Boys' (Juniors).

The Juniors division awarded its first formal championship trophy after being a demonstration sport the previous year (UAAP Season 69, 2006–07). Ateneo de Manila High School (AHS) Blue Eaglets won the championship that year.

The UST Tiger Judokas and the UP Lady Judokas were the defending champions in Men's and Women's divisions. Both had record-setting nine UAAP titles under their belts.

After the tournament, the UP Maroon & Lady Judokas won the double crown and set a league-leading 14 total titles. The AHS Blue Eaglets took the first UAAP title by winning the Junior's division.

== Championships ==
=== Men's division ===
Coaches: Emmanuel R. Jingco and Marc San Valentin

== Roster of players Men's Division ==
-60 kg (Extra Light)

1. Vicente Nonoy L. Fernandez (Noy)

2. --------------------------

-66 kg (Half Light)

1. Marc Enriquez

2. Raphael Antonio Paguio (Anton)

-73 kg (Light)

1. John Mari M. Mangahas (Jeon)

2. Edgar J. Ordillas

-81 kg (Half Middle)

1. Gabriel A. Pangalangan (Gab)

2. Rafael Alejandro L. Solis (Robby)

-90 kg (Middle)

1. Viktor Carlo Dalisay (Poto)

2. Carl Aldwin M. Pajar

-100 kg (Half Heavy)

1. Martin Benjamin T. Lagmay (Marts)

2. ---------------------------

+100 kg (Heavy)

1. Dominic Arthur S. Bayon (Dom)

2. Patrick Jericho Santos

=== Women's division ===
Coach: Reylin K. San Juan

== Roster of players Women's Division ==
-48 kg (Extra Light)

1. Jonalyn Labon (Len)

2. Francesca Guevarra

-52 kg (Half Light)

1. Michelle de Ocampo (Bem)

2. Jaymee Gatapia

-57 kg (Light)

1. Jessamine Ponciano

2. Lyka Revillosa

-63 kg (Half Middle)

1. Thessalonica Clarin

2. Joselle Orfrecio

-70 kg (Middle)

1. Leslyn Gonzales

2. Mylene Gonzales

-78 kg (Half Heavy)

1. Trizha Oliveros

2. Adrienne Bernardez

+78 kg (Heavy)

1. Mellisa Buyco (Isay)

== Competition summary ==
UP Men's Judo - Champion

UP Women's Judo - Champion

MVP (Men) - Rafael Solis

MVP (Women) - Thessa Clarin

== See also ==
- UAAP Season 70
