= Wendy Semana =

Filipino volleyball player

Personal information
- Full name: Wendy Anne Semana
- Nationality: Filipino
- Born: February 15, 1986 (age 40)
- Education: Far Eastern University
- Height: 1.62 m (5 ft 4 in)

Volleyball information
- Position: Setter

Career
- Years: Team
- 2013–2014 2016–2020: Philippine Air Force
- 2021–2023: PLDT High Speed Hitters

Wendy Anne Semana (born February 15, 1986) is a former Filipino volleyball player last played for the PLDT High Speed Hitters of the Premier Volleyball League.

== Career ==
=== Collegiate ===
Semana play for the Lady Tamaraws of the Far Eastern University in the University Athletic Association of the Philippines (UAAP).

She ended her stint with FEU last playing for them in Season 70, where they won a championship title and she was awarded Most Valuable Player.

=== Retirement ===
December 2023, Semana officially announced her retirement from volleyball.

== Clubs ==
- (Philippines) Philippine Air Force Lady Jet Spikers (2013–2014, 2016–2020)
- (Philippines) PLDT High Speed Hitters (2021–2023)

== Awards ==
=== Individual ===
Year	League	Season/Conference	Award	Ref
2008	UAAP	70	Most Valuable Player	
2016	SVL	Open	Best Setter	

=== Clubs ===
Year	League	Season/Conference	Club	Title	Ref
2013	POC-PSC PNG		Philippine Air Force Lady Jet Spikers	Champions	
2014	POC-PSC PNG		Philippine Air Force Lady Jet Spikers	Champions	
2016	SVL	Open	Philippine Air Force Lady Jet Spikers	Runner-up	
