= FEU Tamaraws volleyball =

Team of Far Eastern University, Philippines

FEU Tamaraws
- University: Far Eastern University
- Nickname: Tamaraws
- Location: Sampaloc, Manila, Philippines
- Head coach: Eddieson Orcullo
- Captain: Jelord Talisayan

Main league
- League: UAAP
- Season 85 (2023): 3rd place

Other league/s
- League: Spikers' Turf
- Competes as: FEU-DN Steel Tamaraws
- 2025 Invitational: 8th place

Championships
- UAAP: 25

The FEU Tamaraws volleyball program is the men's collegiate varsity volleyball team of the Far Eastern University. The team competes in the University Athletic Association of the Philippines (UAAP).

== History ==
The FEU Tamaraw Spikers won their first UAAP volleyball title in season 9 (1946–47). As of UAAP Season 75, the Tamaraws have won 25 UAAP volleyball titles. The Tamaraw Spikers have the longest championship streak in the UAAP. They were champions for twelve consecutive seasons, from 1946 to 1957.

== Current roster ==
UAAP Season 86 roster
Number	Player	Position	Height	Birth date	High School
1	Herald Domingo	Middle Blocker	1.92 m (6 ft 4 in)	October 12, 2000 (age 26)	Arellano University
2	Jomel Codilla	Outside Hitter	1.78 m (5 ft 10 in)	October 3, 2000 (age 26)	Far Eastern University Diliman
3	Ariel Cacao	Setter	1.74 m (5 ft 9 in)	October 20, 2001 (age 25)	Far Eastern University Diliman
4	Raymond Bryce De Guzman	Libero	1.74 m (5 ft 9 in)	July 5, 2002 (age 24)	Far Eastern University Diliman
5	Jelord Talisayan	Outside Hitter	1.83 m (6 ft 0 in)	July 5, 2002 (age 24)	Far Eastern University Diliman
6	Mark Calado	Outside Hitter			
7	Jose Magdalino Javelona	Outside Hitter	1.84 m (6 ft 0 in)	September 14, 2000 (age 26)	Far Eastern University Diliman
8	Reymond Sabanal	Middle Blocker	1.86 m (6 ft 1 in)	April 8, 2001 (age 25)	Dipolog City Institute of Technology
9	Zhydryx Saavedra	Opposite Hitter			
12	Carl Jonnard Cabatac	Opposite Hitter	1.72 m (5 ft 8 in)	January 12, 2002 (age 24)	Far Eastern University Diliman
14	Martin Bugaoan	Middle Blocker	1.86 m (6 ft 1 in)	May 14, 2001 (age 25)	
15	Jacob Celajes	Libero			
16	Jefferson Abuniawan	Middle Blocker	1.84 m (6 ft 0 in)	March 3, 2001 (age 25)	Far Eastern University Diliman
17	Benny Martinez	Setter	1.86 m (6 ft 1 in)	February 14, 2001 (age 25)	Far Eastern University Diliman

== Team awards ==
=== UAAP ===
FEU Tamaraws
Year	Season	Title	Ref
1946–1947	UAAP Season 9	Champions	
1947–1948	UAAP Season 10	Champions	
1948–1949	UAAP Season 11	Champions	
1949–1950	UAAP Season 12	Champions	
1950–1951	UAAP Season 13	Champions	
1951–1952	UAAP Season 14	Champions	
1952–1953	UAAP Season 15	Champions	
1953–1954	UAAP Season 16	Champions	
1954–1955	UAAP Season 17	Champions	
1955–1956	UAAP Season 18	Champions	
1956–1957	UAAP Season 19	Champions	
1957–1958	UAAP Season 20	Champions	
1987–1988	UAAP Season 50	Champions	
1988–1989	UAAP Season 51	Champions	
1993–1994	UAAP Season 56	Champions	
1994–1995	UAAP Season 57	Champions	
1996–1997	UAAP Season 59	Champions	
1997–1998	UAAP Season 60	Champions	
1998–1999	UAAP Season 61	Runner-up	
1999–2000	UAAP Season 62	Champions	
2000–2001	UAAP Season 63	Runner-up	
2003–2004	UAAP Season 66	3rd place	
2004–2005	UAAP Season 67	Champions	
2005–2006	UAAP Season 68	Champions	
2006–2007	UAAP Season 69	Champions	
2007–2008	UAAP Season 70	Runner up	
2009–2010	UAAP Season 72	Runner up	
2010–2011	UAAP Season 73	Runner up	
2011–2012	UAAP Season 74	Champions	
2012–2013	UAAP Season 75	Runner up	
2013–2014	UAAP Season 76	3rd place	
2016–2017	UAAP Season 79	3rd place	
2017–2018	UAAP Season 80	3rd place	
2018–2019	UAAP Season 81	Runner up	
2022–2023	UAAP Season 85	3rd place	

=== Other Collegiate Leagues ===
FEU Tamaraws
Year	Season	Title	Ref
2017	2017 PVL Collegiate Conference	Runner-up	
2018	2018 PVL Collegiate Conference	3rd place	
2023	2023 V-League Collegiate Challenge	3rd place	
2024	2024 V-League Collegiate Challenge	Champions	
2025	2025 V-League Collegiate Challenge	Champions	

== Individual awards ==
=== UAAP ===
FEU Tamaraws
Year	Season	Award	Player	Ref
1996–1997	UAAP Season 59	Most Valuable Player	Herminio Gallo Jr.	
2004–2005	UAAP Season 67	Most Valuable Player	Rolan Macahia	
2005–2006	UAAP Season 68	Most Valuable Player	Jemari	
2006–2007	UAAP Season 69	Most Valuable Player	Edjet Mabbayad	
2006–2007	UAAP Season 69	Best Attacker	Jeremy Floyd Pedregosa	
2006–2007	UAAP Season 69	Best Server	Jessie Lopez	
2006–2007	UAAP Season 69	Best Receiver	Mark Sibug	
2007–2008	UAAP Season 70	Best Scorer	Edjet Mabbayad	
2007–2008	UAAP Season 70	Best Attacker	Edjet Mabbayad	
2007–2008	UAAP Season 70	Best Setter	Jessie Lopez	
2007–2008	UAAP Season 70	Best Receiver	Francisco Dela Cruz	
2010–2011	UAAP Season 73	Best Setter	Pitrus De Ocampo	
2010–2011	UAAP Season 73	Best Server	Pitrus De Ocampo	
2011–2012	UAAP Season 74	Most Valuable Player (Finals)	Rodolfo Labrador Jr.	
2011–2012	UAAP Season 74	Best Scorer	Rodolfo Labrador Jr.	
2011–2012	UAAP Season 74	Best Setter	Pitrus De Ocampo	
2012–2013	UAAP Season 75	Best Server	Arvin Avila	
2012–2013	UAAP Season 75	Best Receiver	Arvin Avila	
2015–2016	UAAP Season 75	Best Receiver	Rikko Marius Marmeto	
2016–2017	UAAP Season 79	Best Blocker	John Paul Bugaoan	
2016–2017	UAAP Season 79	Best Receiver	Rikko Marius Marmeto	
2017–2018	UAAP Season 80	Best Receiver	Rikko Marius Marmeto	
2018–2019	UAAP Season 81	1st Best Middle Blocker	John Paul Bugaoan	

=== Other Collegiate Leagues ===
FEU Tamaraws
Year	Tournament	Award	Player	Ref
2017	2017 PVL Collegiate Conference	1st Best Middle Blocker	John Paul Bugaoan	
2018	2018 PVL Collegiate Conference	1st Best Middle Blocker	John Paul Bugaoan	
2023	2023 V-League Collegiate Challenge	1st Best Middle Blocker	Lirick Mendoza	
2024	2024 V-League Collegiate Challenge	Most Valuable Player (Finals)	Zhydryx Saavedra	
2024	2024 V-League Collegiate Challenge	Best Opposite Spiker	Zhydryx Saavedra	
2024	2024 V-League Collegiate Challenge	1st Best Outside Spiker	Jelord Talisayan	
2025	2025 V-League Collegiate Challenge	Most Valuable Player (Finals)	Zhydryx Saavedra	
2025	2025 V-League Collegiate Challenge	2nd Best Middle Blocker	Lirick Mendoza	

=== Spikers' Turf ===
FEU Tamaraws–DN Steel
Year	Tournament	Award	Player	Ref
2024	2024 Spikers' Turf Invitational Conference	Best Opposite Spiker	Zhydryx Saavedra	

== Records by season ==
Records starting UAAP Season 56

FEU Tamaraws
Year	UAAP Season	Title	Team captain	Won or Lost to (finalist or higher rank)
1993–1994	56	Champions		UST Golden Spikers
1994–1995	57	Champions		UST Golden Spikers
1995–1996	58	4th place		
1996–1997	59	Champions		UST Golden Spikers
1997–1998	60	Champions		UST Golden Spikers
1998–1999	61	Runner-up		UST Golden Spikers
1999–2000	62	Champions		UST Golden Spikers
2000–2001	63	Runner-up		UST Golden Spikers
2001–2002	64	4th place		
2002–2003	65	4th place		
2003–2004	66	3rd place		
2004–2005	67	Champions		UST Golden Spikers
2005–2006	68	Champions		UST Golden Spikers
2006–2007	69	Champions		UST Golden Spikers
2007–2008	70	Runner up		UST Golden Spikers
2008–2009	71	6th place		
2009–2010	72	Runner up		UST Golden Spikers
2010–2011	73	Runner up		UST Golden Spikers
2011–2012	74	Champions		UST Golden Spikers
2012–2013	75	Runner up		NU Bulldogs
2013–2014	76	3rd place		
2014–2015	77	5th place		
2015–2016	78	5th place		
2016–2017	79	3rd place		
2017–2018	80	3rd place		
2018–2019	81	Runner up		NU Bulldogs
2019–2020	82	Cancelled		
2020–2021	83	Cancelled		
2021–2022	84	Cancelled		
2022–2023	85	3rd place		

== Coaches ==
- UAAP Season 78–85: (Philippines) Reynaldo Diaz Jr.
- UAAP Season 86–87: (Philippines) Eddieson Orcullo

== Former players ==
- (Philippines) Jessie Lopez (S)
- (Philippines) Kris Silang (S)
- (Philippines) Pitrus De Ocampo (S)
- (Philippines) Rikko Marmeto (L)
- (Philippines) Vince Lorenzo (L)
- (Philippines) JP Bugaoan (MB)
- (Philippines) Peter Quiel (MB)
- (Philippines) Rodolfo Labrador (MB)
- (Philippines) Jude Garcia (OH/OP)
- (Philippines) Ralph Venezuela (OH/OP)

Legend
S	Setter
L	Libero
MB	Middle Blocker
OS	Outside Hitter
OP	Opposite Hitter

== See also ==
- FEU Baby Tamaraws
- FEU Lady Tamaraws volleyball
- Shakey's Super League
