= UAAP Season 68 women's volleyball tournament =

Volleyball tournaments

UAAP Season 68 volleyball tournaments
- SOAR Higher!
- Host school: Adamson University
Women's Finals	G1	G2	Wins
Adamson Lady Falcons	0	1	0
De La Salle Green Archers	3	3	2
- Duration: September 14–17, 2005
- Finals MVP: Desiree Hernandez
- Winning coach: Ramil de Jesus
- Semifinalists: FEU Lady Tamaraws; UST Growling Tigresses
- TV network(s): Studio 23

The women's volleyball tournament of UAAP Season 68 ran from July 17, 2005, to September 17, 2005, at various locations within Metro Manila which include Adamson University Gym in San Marcelino St., Ermita, Manila.

== Elimination round ==
=== Team standings ===
Pos	Team	Pld	W	L	Pts	SW	SL	SR	Qualification
1	Adamson Lady Falcons	14	11	3	33	34	11	3.091	Twice-to-beat in the semifinals
2	FEU Lady Tamaraws	14	11	3	33	34	11	3.091	Twice-to-beat in the semifinals
3	De La Salle Lady Archers	14	11	3	33	39	15	2.600	Twice-to-win in the semifinals
4	UST Growling Tigresses	14	8	6	24	25	21	1.190	Twice-to-win in the semifinals
5	Ateneo Lady Eagles	14	6	8	18	27	27	1.000	
6	UE Amazons	14	6	8	18	22	29	0.759	
7	UP Lady Maroons	14	4	10	12	12	34	0.353	
8	NU Lady Bulldogs	14	0	14	0	1	42	0.024	

Source: ABS-CBN Sports

=== Match-up results ===
	Round 1							Round 2						
Team ╲ Game	1	2	3	4	5	6	7	8	9	10	11	12	13	14
AdU	Ateneo school colors	La Salle school colors	NU school colors	FEU school colors	UST school colors	UE school colors	UP school colors	La Salle school colors	Ateneo school colors	FEU school colors	UST school colors	UP school colors	NU school colors	UE school colors
ADMU	Adamson school colors	UE school colors	UP school colors	UST school colors	FEU school colors	La Salle school colors	NU school colors	UP school colors	Adamson school colors	NU school colors	FEU school colors	La Salle school colors	UE school colors	UST school colors
DLSU	UE school colors	Adamson school colors	FEU school colors	UP school colors	NU school colors	Ateneo school colors	UST school colors	Adamson school colors	UP school colors	UE school colors	NU school colors	Ateneo school colors	UST school colors	FEU school colors
FEU	UST school colors	NU school colors	La Salle school colors	Adamson school colors	Ateneo school colors	UP school colors	UE school colors	UE school colors	NU school colors	Adamson school colors	Ateneo school colors	UST school colors	UP school colors	La Salle school colors
NU	UP school colors	FEU school colors	Adamson school colors	UE school colors	La Salle school colors	UST school colors	Ateneo school colors	UST school colors	FEU school colors	Ateneo school colors	La Salle school colors	UE school colors	Adamson school colors	UP school colors
UE	La Salle school colors	Ateneo school colors	UST school colors	NU school colors	UP school colors	Adamson school colors	FEU school colors	FEU school colors	UST school colors	La Salle school colors	UP school colors	NU school colors	Ateneo school colors	Adamson school colors
UP	NU school colors	UST school colors	Ateneo school colors	La Salle school colors	UE school colors	FEU school colors	Adamson school colors	Ateneo school colors	La Salle school colors	UST school colors	UE school colors	Adamson school colors	FEU school colors	NU school colors
UST	FEU school colors	UP school colors	UE school colors	Ateneo school colors	Adamson school colors	NU school colors	La Salle school colors	NU school colors	UE school colors	UP school colors	Adamson school colors	FEU school colors	La Salle school colors	Ateneo school colors

Source: ABS-CBN Sports
= Win; = Loss

=== Game results ===
Results on top and to the right of the solid cells are for first-round games; those to the bottom and left are for second-round games.

Teams	AdU	AdMU	DLSU	FEU	NU	UE	UP	UST
Adamson Lady Falcons		3–1	3–2	3–0	3–0	3–0	3–0	3–0
Ateneo Blue Eagles	2–3		2–3	0–3	3–0	1–3	3–0	3–1
De La Salle Lady Spikers	3–0	3–2		3–0	3–0	2–3	3–0	3–0
FEU Lady Tamaraws	3–1	3–0	2–3		3–0	2–3	3–0	3–0
NU Lady Bulldogs	0–3	0–3	0–3	0–3		0–3	0–3	1–3
UE Lady Red Warriors	0–3	2–3	0–3	0–3	3–0		3–0	0–3
UP Fighting Maroons	3–0	0–3	0–3	0–3	3–0	3–2		3–2
UST Golden Tigresses	3–0	3–1	3–2	0–3	3–0	3–0	3–0	

Source: UAAP on Facebook
Legend: Blue = left column team win; Red = top row team win.

== Bracket ==
1st seed playoffs
Adamson	3
FEU	2

Semifinals
1	Adamson	3
2	FEU	1
3	La Salle	3
4	UST	0

Championship
1	Adamson	0	1
3	La Salle	3	3

== Final round ==
=== First seed playoffs ===
Date	Time		Score		Set 1	Set 2	Set 3	Set 4	Set 5	Total	Report
7 Sep	14:00	Adamson Lady Falcons	3–2	FEU Lady Tamaraws	25–23	22–25	14–25	25–20	16–14	102–107	

=== Semifinals ===
Date	Time		Score		Set 1	Set 2	Set 3	Set 4	Set 5	Total	Report
10 Sep	14:00	FEU Lady Tamaraws	1–3	Adamson Lady Falcons	15–25	21–25	25–20	22–25		83–95	
10 Sep	16:00	De La Salle Lady Archers	3–0	UST Growling Tigresses	25–18	25–15	25–23			75–56	

=== Championship ===
Date	Time		Score		Set 1	Set 2	Set 3	Set 4	Set 5	Total	Report
14 Sep	16:00	Adamson Lady Falcons	0–3	De La Salle Lady Archers	19–25	21–25	15–25			55–75	
17 Sep	16:00	De La Salle Lady Archers	3–1	Adamson Lady Falcons	25–18	22–25	25–18	25–15		97–76	

== Awards ==
UAAP Season 68 women's volleyball champions
De La Salle Lady Archers
Fourth title

- Most Valuable Player: Desiree Hernandez (De La Salle Lady Archers)
- Rookie of the Year: Lilet Mabbayad (UST Growling Tigresses)
- Best Server: Rachel Daquis (FEU Lady Tamaraws)
- Best Setter: Relea Ferina Saet (De La Salle Lady Archers)
- Best Libero: Sharmaine Peñano (De La Salle Lady Archers)

Preceded by Season 67 (2004)	UAAP volleyball tournaments Season 68 (2005)	Succeeded by Season 69 (2007)
