= 1996 UAAP Women's Volleyball =

== Elimination round ==
FIRST ROUND OF ELIMINATIONS
JULY 20							JULY 21						
Game	Team	1st	2nd	3rd	4th	5th	Game	Team	1st	2nd	3rd	4th	5th
1st	University of the East	11	13	15	13	-	1st	University of the Philippines	7	8	7	-	-
1st	University of the Philippines	15	15	12	15	-	1st	Adamson University	15	15	15	-	-
2nd	National University	1	5	3	-	-	2nd	Ateneo de Manila University	15	15	15	-	-
2nd	De La Salle University	15	15	15	-	-	2nd	National University	0	0	2	-	-
3rd	Adamson University	15	15	15	-	-	3rd	Far Eastern University	15	15	15	-	-
3rd	Far Eastern University	13	12	13	-	-	3rd	University of the East	12	12	12	-	-
4th	University of Santo Tomas	15	11	15	14	15	4th	De La Salle University	11	10	7	-	-
4th	Ateneo de Manila University	12	15	16	17	11	4th	University of Santo Tomas	15	15	15	-	-
JULY 27							JULY 28						
Game	Team	1st	2nd	3rd	4th	5th	Game	Team	1st	2nd	3rd	4th	5th
1st	De La Salle University	15	15	15	-	-	1st	University of Santo Tomas	15	15	15	-	-
1st	University of the Philippines	12	13	6	-	-	1st	University of the East	3	7	2	-	-
2nd	National University	11	11	13	-	-	2nd	Adamson University	17	15	17	-	-
2nd	University of the East	15	15	15	-	-	2nd	De La Salle University	14	9	16	-	-
3rd	University of Santo Tomas	15	15	15	-	-	3rd	University of the Philippines	3	4	3	-	-
3rd	Adamson University	13	7	12	-	-	3rd	Ateneo de Manila University	15	15	15	-	-
4th	Ateneo de Manila University	15	15	15	-	-	4th	Far Eastern University	15	15	15	-	-
4th	Far Eastern University	6	9	7	-	-	4th	National University	11	7	4	-	-
AUGUST 3							AUGUST 4						
Game	Team	1st	2nd	3rd	4th	5th	Game	Team	1st	2nd	3rd	4th	5th
1st	University of Santo Tomas	15	15	15	-	-	1st	Far Eastern University	15	15	15	-	-
1st	University of the Philippines	6	6	8	-	-	1st	University of the Philippines	5	9	5	-	-
2nd	National University	1	5	3	-	-	2nd	National University	0	0	0	-	-
2nd	Adamson University	15	15	15	-	-	2nd	University of Santo Tomas	15	15	15	-	-
3rd	University of the East	4	2	4	-	-	3rd	Adamson University	15	15	15	-	-
3rd	Ateneo de Manila University	15	15	15	-	-	3rd	University of the East	5	5	7	-	-
4th	De La Salle University	12	15	7	15	15	4th	Ateneo de Manila University	15	15	15	-	-
4th	Far Eastern University	15	10	15	8	12	4th	De La Salle University	8	3	10	-	-
AUGUST 10
Game	Team	1st	2nd	3rd	4th	5th							
1st	University of the Philippines	15	15	15	-	-							
1st	National University	8	8	8	-	-							
2nd	De La Salle University	15	15	15	-	-							
2nd	University of the East	13	10	12	-	-							
3rd	Adamson University	8	5	9	-	-							
3rd	Ateneo de Manila University	15	15	15	-	-							
4th	University of Santo Tomas	15	15	15	-	-							
4th	Far Eastern University	7	10	8	-	-							
SECOND ROUND OF ELIMINATIONS
AUGUST 11							AUGUST 17						
Game	Team	1st	2nd	3rd	4th	5th	Game	Team	1st	2nd	3rd	4th	5th
1st	National University	5	6	4	-	-	1st	De La Salle University	15	15	15	-	-
1st	University of the Philippines	15	15	15	-	-	1st	National University	5	1	3	-	-
2nd	University of the East	10	2	5	-	-	2nd	Adamson University	15	15	15	-	-
2nd	Far Eastern University	15	15	15	-	-	2nd	University of the East	4	4	4	-	-
3rd	Ateneo de Manila University	15	15	15	-	-	3rd	University of the Philippines	2	7	3	-	-
3rd	De La Salle University	12	9	10	-	-	3rd	Ateneo de Manila University	15	15	15	-	-
4th	University of Santo Tomas	15	15	14	13	15	4th	Far Eastern University	17	15	15	-	-
4th	Adamson University	12	12	17	15	13	4th	University of Santo Tomas	14	6	9	-	-
AUGUST 18							AUGUST 24						
Game	Team	1st	2nd	3rd	4th	5th	Game	Team	1st	2nd	3rd	4th	5th
1st	National University	0	0	0	-	-	1st	University of Santo Tomas	15	15	15	-	-
1st	Far Eastern University	15	15	15	-	-	1st	University of the Philippines	10	10	13	-	-
2nd	University of the East	10	9	9	-	-	2nd	University of the East	7	7	7	-	-
2nd	University of the Philippines	15	15	15	-	-	2nd	Ateneo de Manila University	15	15	15	-	-
3rd	University of Santo Tomas	15	15	15	-	-	3rd	Adamson University	15	15	15	-	-
3rd	De La Salle University	12	11	12	-	-	3rd	National University	8	5	8	-	-
4th	Ateneo de Manila University	15	13	12	15	16	4th	Far Eastern University	15	15	15	-	-
4th	Adamson University	12	15	15	8	17	4th	De La Salle University	13	13	5	-	-
AUGUST 25							AUGUST 31						
Game	Team	1st	2nd	3rd	4th	5th	Game	Team	1st	2nd	3rd	4th	5th
1st	National University	5	12	8	-	-	1st	National University	0	0	0	-	-
1st	University of Santo Tomas	15	15	15	-	-	1st	Ateneo de Manila University	15	15	15	-	-
2nd	University of the Philippines	15	15	15	17	-	2nd	University of Santo Tomas	15	15	15	-	-
2nd	Adamson University	17	12	13	14	-	2nd	University of the East	8	9	9	-	-
3rd	De La Salle University	15	15	15	-	-	3rd	Adamson University	12	12	12	-	-
3rd	University of the East	7	6	8	-	-	3rd	Far Eastern University	15	15	15	-	-
4th	Ateneo de Manila University	15	10	15	13	15	4th	University of the Philippines	9	9	9	-	-
4th	Far Eastern University	12	15	13	15	17	4th	De La Salle University	15	15	15	-	-
SEPTEMBER 1
Game	Team	1st	2nd	3rd	4th	5th							
1st	University of the East	12	15	13	15	15							
1st	National University	15	13	15	11	10							
2nd	Far Eastern University	15	12	15	15	-							
2nd	University of the Philippines	13	15	7	10	-							
3rd	De La Salle University	15	15	11	15	-							
3rd	Adamson University	4	11	15	8	-							
4th	Ateneo de Manila University	11	9	8	-	-							
4th	University of Santo Tomas	15	15	15	-	-							

== Postseason ==
POST-SEASON TOURNAMENT
PLAYOFFS - SEPTEMBER 4
Game	Team	1st	2nd	3rd	4th	5th
1st	Adamson University	15	7	11	15	17
1st	De La Salle University	13	15	15	6	16
FINAL FOUR GAME 1 - SEPTEMBER 6
Game	Team	1st	2nd	3rd	4th	5th
1st	University of Santo Tomas	12	13	15	7	-
1st	Adamson University	15	15	12	15	-
2nd	Ateneo de Manila University	15	11	11	13	-
2nd	Far Eastern University	13	15	15	15	-
FINAL FOUR GAME 2 - SEPTEMBER 8
Game	Team	1st	2nd	3rd	4th	5th
1st	Adamson University	15	13	15	14	10
1st	University of Santo Tomas	12	15	11	17	15
2nd	Far Eastern University	13	15	15	12	17
2nd	Ateneo de Manila University	15	11	11	15	16
FINALS GAME 1 - SEPTEMBER 11
Game	Team	1st	2nd	3rd	4th	5th
1st	University of Santo Tomas	15	15	15	-	-
1st	Far Eastern University	11	9	9	-	-
FINALS GAME 2 - SEPTEMBER 14
Game	Team	1st	2nd	3rd	4th	5th
1st	Far Eastern University	16	3	13	-	-
1st	University of Santo Tomas	17	15	15	-	-

Preceded by Season 58 (1995)	UAAP volleyball seasons Season 59 (1996) volleyball	Succeeded by Season 60 (1997)
