= UAAP Season 70 volleyball tournaments =

Volleyball tournaments

| Men's Finals | G1 | G2 | G3 | Wins |
|---|---|---|---|---|
| FEU Tamaraws | 1 | 3 | 2 | 1 |
| UST Growling Tigers | 3 | 1 | 3 | 2 |
- Duration: February 24–March 2, 2008
- Arena(s): The Arena in San Juan
- Finals MVP: Reno Roque
- Semifinalists: Adamson Soaring Falcons; UP Fighting Maroons
- TV network(s): Studio 23
| Women's Finals | G1 | G2 | G3 | Wins |
|---|---|---|---|---|
| Adamson Lady Falcons | 3 | 1 | 2 | 1 |
| FEU Lady Tamaraws | 2 | 3 | 3 | 2 |
- Duration: February 24–March 2, 2008
- Arena(s): The Arena in San Juan
- Finals MVP: Wendyanne Semana
- Semifinalists: UST Tigresses; Ateneo Lady Eagles
- TV network(s): Studio 23

The UAAP Season 70 volleyball tournaments opened December 1, 2007 and ended March 2, 2008. The tournament host is University of the Philippines. Tournament games were held at the Ateneo de Manila Blue Eagle Gym, Rizal Memorial Coliseum, Ninoy Aquino Stadium and University of the East Gymnasium.

== Men's tournament ==
=== Elimination round ===
==== Team standings ====
| Pos | Team | Pld | W | L | Pts | SW | SL | SR | Qualification |
|---|---|---|---|---|---|---|---|---|---|
| 1 | FEU Tamaraws | 14 | 13 | 1 | 39 (Note: First–seed playoff: FEU 3–0 UST) | 34 | 8 | 4.250 | Twice-to-beat in the semifinals |
| 2 | UST Growling Tigers (H) | 14 | 13 | 1 | 39 | 36 | 9 | 4.000 | Twice-to-beat in the semifinals |
| 3 | Adamson Soaring Falcons | 14 | 9 | 5 | 27 | 24 | 20 | 1.200 | Twice-to-win in the semifinal |
| 4 | UP Fighting Maroons | 14 | 8 | 6 | 24 | 22 | 27 | 0.815 | Twice-to-win in the semifinal |
| 5 | UE Red Warriors | 14 | 7 | 7 | 21 | 28 | 23 | 1.217 | |
| 6 | De La Salle Green Archers | 14 | 3 | 11 | 9 | 14 | 35 | 0.400 | |
| 7 | Ateneo Blue Eagles | 14 | 2 | 12 | 6 | 13 | 35 | 0.371 | |
| 8 | NU Bulldogs | 14 | 1 | 13 | 3 | 13 | 35 | 0.371 | |

Source: ABS-CBN Sports
Rules for classification: 1) number of wins; 2) if tied for top 4 seeds, or for #4 seed, one-game playoff; 3) match points; 4) sets ratio; 5) points ratio; 6) head-to-head record
(H) Host

==== Schedule ====
| | Round 1 | | | | | | | Round 2 | | | | | | |
| Team ╲ Game | 1 | 2 | 3 | 4 | 5 | 6 | 7 | 8 | 9 | 10 | 11 | 12 | 13 | 14 |
|---|---|---|---|---|---|---|---|---|---|---|---|---|---|---|
| Adamson | La Salle school colors | UP school colors | Ateneo school colors | FEU school colors | NU school colors | UST school colors | UE school colors | FEU school colors | NU school colors | UST school colors | UE school colors | Ateneo school colors | La Salle school colors | UP school colors |
| Ateneo | UE school colors | UST school colors | Adamson school colors | UP school colors | FEU school colors | NU school colors | La Salle school colors | NU school colors | FEU school colors | La Salle school colors | UST school colors | Adamson school colors | UP school colors | UE school colors |
| La Salle | Adamson school colors | NU school colors | UE school colors | UST school colors | UP school colors | FEU school colors | Ateneo school colors | UE school colors | UP school colors | Ateneo school colors | FEU school colors | UST school colors | Adamson school colors | NU school colors |
| FEU | UST school colors | UE school colors | NU school colors | Adamson school colors | Ateneo school colors | La Salle school colors | UP school colors | Adamson school colors | Ateneo school colors | UP school colors | La Salle school colors | NU school colors | UE school colors | UST school colors |
| NU | UP school colors | La Salle school colors | FEU school colors | UE school colors | Adamson school colors | Ateneo school colors | UST school colors | Ateneo school colors | Adamson school colors | UE school colors | UP school colors | FEU school colors | UST school colors | La Salle school colors |
| UE | Ateneo school colors | FEU school colors | La Salle school colors | NU school colors | UST school colors | UP school colors | Adamson school colors | La Salle school colors | UST school colors | NU school colors | Adamson school colors | UP school colors | FEU school colors | Ateneo school colors |
| UP | NU school colors | Adamson school colors | UST school colors | Ateneo school colors | La Salle school colors | UE school colors | FEU school colors | UST school colors | La Salle school colors | FEU school colors | NU school colors | UE school colors | Ateneo school colors | Adamson school colors |
| UST | FEU school colors | Ateneo school colors | UP school colors | La Salle school colors | UE school colors | Adamson school colors | NU school colors | UP school colors | UE school colors | Adamson school colors | Ateneo school colors | La Salle school colors | NU school colors | FEU school colors |

= Win; = Loss

=== Playoffs ===
1st–seed playoff
FEU | 3
UST | 0

Semifinals; Top seeds twice-to-beat
1 | FEU | 3
4 | UP | 0
2 | UST | 3
3 | Adamson | 2

Finals; Best-of-three series
1 | FEU | 1 | 3 | 2
2 | UST | 3 | 1 | 3

=== First-seed playoff ===
| Date | | Score | | Set 1 | Set 2 | Set 3 | Set 4 | Set 5 | Total |
|---|---|---|---|---|---|---|---|---|---|
| Feb 13 | UST Growling Tigers | 0–3 | FEU Tamaraws | 18–25 | 21–25 | 18–25 | – | – | 57–75 |

=== Semi-finals ===
==== UST vs. AdU ====
| Date | | Score | | Set 1 | Set 2 | Set 3 | Set 4 | Set 5 | Total |
|---|---|---|---|---|---|---|---|---|---|
| Feb 17 | UST Growling Tigers | 3–2 | Adamson Soaring Falcons | 19–25 | 25–17 | 20–25 | 25–16 | 16–14 | 105–97 |
UST advances to the Finals

==== FEU vs. UP ====
| Date | | Score | | Set 1 | Set 2 | Set 3 | Set 4 | Set 5 | Total |
|---|---|---|---|---|---|---|---|---|---|
| Feb 17 | FEU Tamaraws | 3–0 | UP Fighting Maroons | 25–11 | 25–14 | 25–23 | – | – | 75–48 |
FEU advances to the Finals

=== Finals ===
| Date | | Score | | Set 1 | Set 2 | Set 3 | Set 4 | Set 5 | Total |
|---|---|---|---|---|---|---|---|---|---|
| Feb 24 | FEU Tamaraws | 1–3 | UST Growling Tigers | 19–25 | 25–16 | 27–29 | 19–25 | – | 90–95 |
| Feb 27 | FEU Tamaraws | 3–1 | UST Growling Tigers | 28–26 | 17–25 | 25–22 | 25–21 | – | 95–94 |
| March 2 | FEU Tamaraws | 2–3 | UST Growling Tigers | 20–25 | 25–16 | 19–25 | 25–20 | 11–15 | 100–101 |
UST wins series 2–1

=== Awards ===
* Most valuable player: Nazareno Roque (UST Growling Tigers)

- Rookie of the Year: Jayson Ramos (UST Growling Tigers)
- Best scorer: Edjet Mabbayad (FEU Tamaraws)
- Best attacker: Edjet Mabbayad (FEU Tamaraws)
- Best blocker: Chris Macasaet (De La Salle Green Archers)
- Best setter: Jessie Lopez (FEU Tamaraws)
- Best server: Ray Karl Dimaculangan (UST Growling Tigers)
- Best receiver: Francisco Dela Cruz (FEU Tamaraws)
- Best digger: Charles Glendon Reyes (UST Growling Tigers)

== Women's tournament ==
=== Elimination round ===
==== Team standings ====
| Pos | Team | Pld | W | L | PCT | GB | Qualification |
|---|---|---|---|---|---|---|---|
| 1 | Adamson Lady Falcons | 14 | 12 | 2 | .857 (Note: Head-to-head sets ratio: Adamson +2, FEU –1, UST –1; second–seed playoff: FEU 3–1 UST; first–seed playoff: Adamson 3–2 FEU) | — | Twice-to-beat in the semifinals |
| 2 | FEU Lady Tamaraws | 14 | 12 | 2 | .857 | — | Twice-to-beat in the semifinals |
| 3 | UST Tigresses (H) | 14 | 12 | 2 | .857 | — | Twice-to-win in the semifinals |
| 4 | Ateneo Lady Eagles | 14 | 8 | 6 | .571 | 4 | Twice-to-win in the semifinals |
| 5 | UP Lady Maroons | 14 | 4 | 10 | .286 | 8 | |
| 6 | NU Lady Bulldogs | 14 | 3 | 11 | .214 | 9 | |
| 7 | De La Salle Lady Archers (Note: All games of De La Salle from January 15 onwards were forfeited when player Jacqueline Alarca continued playing despite her school's approval of her leave of absence. This led her to cease as a De La Salle student, breaking UAAP rules that a player must be enrolled to the school the person represents.) | 14 | 3 | 11 | .214 | 9 | |
| 8 | UE Lady Warriors | 14 | 2 | 12 | .143 | 10 | |

Source: ABS-CBN Sports
Rules for classification: 1) number of wins; 2) if tied for top 4 seeds, or for #4 seed, one-game playoff; 3) match points; 4) sets ratio; 5) points ratio; 6) head-to-head record
(H) Hosts

==== Schedule ====
| | Round 1 | | | | | | | Round 2 | | | | | | |
| Team ╲ Game | 1 | 2 | 3 | 4 | 5 | 6 | 7 | 8 | 9 | 10 | 11 | 12 | 13 | 14 |
|---|---|---|---|---|---|---|---|---|---|---|---|---|---|---|
| Adamson | UST school colors | NU school colors | FEU school colors | La Salle school colors | Ateneo school colors | UP school colors | UE school colors | FEU school colors | La Salle school colors | Ateneo school colors | NU school colors | UP school colors | UE school colors | UST school colors |
| Ateneo | NU school colors | UST school colors | La Salle school colors | UE school colors | Adamson school colors | FEU school colors | UP school colors | UST school colors | UE school colors | Adamson school colors | La Salle school colors | NU school colors | UP school colors | FEU school colors |
| La Salle | UP school colors | UE school colors | Ateneo school colors | Adamson school colors | FEU school colors | UST school colors | NU school colors | UP school colors | Adamson school colors | UE school colors | Ateneo school colors | FEU school colors | UST school colors | NU school colors |
| FEU | UE school colors | UP school colors | Adamson school colors | NU school colors | La Salle school colors | Ateneo school colors | UST school colors | Adamson school colors | UP school colors | UST school colors | UE school colors | La Salle school colors | NU school colors | Ateneo school colors |
| NU | Ateneo school colors | Adamson school colors | UP school colors | FEU school colors | UST school colors | UE school colors | La Salle school colors | UE school colors | UST school colors | UP school colors | Adamson school colors | Ateneo school colors | FEU school colors | La Salle school colors |
| UE | FEU school colors | La Salle school colors | UST school colors | Ateneo school colors | UP school colors | NU school colors | Adamson school colors | NU school colors | Ateneo school colors | La Salle school colors | FEU school colors | UST school colors | Adamson school colors | UP school colors |
| UP | La Salle school colors | FEU school colors | NU school colors | UST school colors | UE school colors | Adamson school colors | Ateneo school colors | La Salle school colors | FEU school colors | NU school colors | UST school colors | Adamson school colors | Ateneo school colors | UE school colors |
| UST | Adamson school colors | Ateneo school colors | UE school colors | UP school colors | NU school colors | La Salle school colors | FEU school colors | Ateneo school colors | NU school colors | FEU school colors | UP school colors | UE school colors | La Salle school colors | Adamson school colors |

= Win; = Win by forfeit; = Loss; = Loss by forfeit

=== Playoffs ===
2nd–seed playoff
FEU | 3
UST | 1

1st–seed playoff
Adamson | 3
FEU | 2

Semifinals; Higher seed twice-to-beat
1 | Adamson | 3
4 | Ateneo | 0
2 | FEU | 3
3 | UST | 2

Finals; Best-of-three series
1 | Adamson | 3 | 1 | 2
2 | FEU | 2 | 3 | 3

=== Second–seed playoff ===
| Date | | Score | | Set 1 | Set 2 | Set 3 | Set 4 | Set 5 | Total |
|---|---|---|---|---|---|---|---|---|---|
| Feb 13 | UST Tigresses | 1–3 | FEU Lady Tamaraws | 26–24 | 19–25 | 15–25 | 20–25 | – | 80–99 |

=== First–seed playoff ===
| Date | | Score | | Set 1 | Set 2 | Set 3 | Set 4 | Set 5 | Total |
|---|---|---|---|---|---|---|---|---|---|
| Feb 17 | FEU Lady Tamaraws | 2–3 | Adamson Lady Falcons | 25–23 | 25–20 | 21–25 | 20–25 | 12–15 | 103–108 |

=== Semifinals ===
==== FEU vs. UST ====
| Date | | Score | | Set 1 | Set 2 | Set 3 | Set 4 | Set 5 | Total |
|---|---|---|---|---|---|---|---|---|---|
| Feb 20 | FEU Lady Tamaraws | 3–2 | UST Tigresses | 25–19 | 25–19 | 15–25 | 21–25 | 15–9 | 101–97 |
FEU advances to the Finals

==== Adamson vs. Ateneo ====
| Date | | Score | | Set 1 | Set 2 | Set 3 | Set 4 | Set 5 | Total |
|---|---|---|---|---|---|---|---|---|---|
| Feb 20 | Adamson Lady Falcons | 3–0 | Ateneo Lady Eagles | 25–18 | 26–24 | 25–16 | – | – | 76–58 |
Adamson advances to the Finals

=== Finals ===
| Date | | Score | | Set 1 | Set 2 | Set 3 | Set 4 | Set 5 | Total |
|---|---|---|---|---|---|---|---|---|---|
| Feb 24 | Adamson Lady Falcons | 3–2 | FEU Lady Tamaraws | 23–25 | 25–20 | 26–24 | 24–26 | 15–7 | 113–102 |
| Feb 27 | Adamson Lady Falcons | 1-3 | FEU Lady Tamaraws | 18–25 | 25–16 | 10–25 | 21–25 | – | 74–91 |
| March 2 | Adamson Lady Falcons | 2–3 | FEU Lady Tamaraws | 25–14 | 19–25 | 25–23 | 21–25 | 9–15 | 99–102 |
FEU wins series 2–1

=== Awards ===
* Most valuable player: Wendy Anne Semana (FEU Lady Tamaraws)

- Rookie of the Year: Maria Carmina Denise Acevedo (Ateneo Lady Eagles)
- Best scorer: Maria Rosario Soriano (Ateneo Lady Eagles)
- Best attacker: Mary Jean Balse (UST Tigresses)
- Best blocker: Celine Anne Hernandez (De La Salle Lady Archers)
- Best setter: Janet Serafica (Adamson Lady Falcons)
- Best server: Rissa Jane Laguiles (Adamson Lady Falcons)
- Best receiver: Maria Rosario Soriano (Ateneo Lady Eagles)
- Best digger: Lizlee Ann Gata (Adamson Lady Falcons)
