= UAAP Season 70 =

University athletic year

- "Winners All, Recreating the Value of Honesty through Sports"
- Host school: University of Santo Tomas

Overall
- Seniors: University of Santo Tomas
- Juniors: University of Santo Tomas

Seniors' champions
| Sport | | Men | Women |
| Basketball | | La Salle | Ateneo |
| Volleyball | | UST | FEU |
| Chess | | FEU | UST |
| Table tennis | | UST | FEU |
| Taekwondo | | FEU | UST |
| Beach volleyball | | FEU | FEU |
| Judo | | UP | UP |
| Track and field | | FEU | FEU |
| Fencing | | UST | UE |
| Football | | FEU | FEU |
| Tennis | | UST | UST |
| Badminton | | La Salle | UST |
| Baseball | | Adamson | NT |
| Softball | | NT | UP |
| Swimming | | UP | UST |
- Cheerdance: UP (Ex - Coed)

Juniors' champions
| Sport | | Boys | Girls |
| Basketball | | DLSZ | NT |
| Volleyball | | UE | UST |
| Chess | | Adamson | |
| Table tennis | | UST | |
| Taekwondo | | UST | |
| Beach volleyball | | Ateneo | |
| Judo | | UST | |
| Track and field | | DLSZ | |
| Fencing | | Ateneo | UPIS |
- (NT) = No tournament; (DS) = Demonstration Sport; (Ex) = Exhibition;

UAAP Season 70 was the 2007-08 season of the University Athletic Association of the Philippines, which was hosted by the University of Santo Tomas. The theme of season 70 was "Winners All, Recreating the Value of Honesty through Sports" It opened on July 7, 2007 at the Araneta Coliseum. De La Salle University returned to active participation after being suspended in Season 69.

== Basketball ==
The UAAP Season 70 basketball tournament began on July 7, 2007 at the Araneta Coliseum in Cubao, Quezon City. The tournament host was University of Santo Tomas and tournament commissioner was Edgardo "Ed" Cordero.

Men's basketball games were held at the Ninoy Aquino Stadium, the Cuneta Astrodome and the Araneta Coliseum. The women's and juniors' games were held at the school gyms of Adamson University, Ateneo de Manila University and Far Eastern University.

=== Seniors division ===
==== Men's tournament ====
===== Elimination round =====
====== Team standings ======
| Pos | Team | W | L | PCT | GB | Qualification |
|---|---|---|---|---|---|---|
| 1 | UE Red Warriors | 14 | 0 | 1.000 | — | Advance to the Finals (Note: As UE won all of their elimination round games, the stepladder format will be used instead of the regular Final Four format.) |
| 2 | De La Salle Green Archers | 9 | 5 | .643 (Note: Second-seed playoff: La Salle 70–69 Ateneo) | 5 | Twice-to-beat in stepladder round 2 |
| 3 | Ateneo Blue Eagles | 9 | 5 | .643 | 5 | Proceed to stepladder round 1 |
| 4 | UST Growling Tigers (H) | 8 | 6 | .571 (Note: Fourth-seed playoff: UST 80–69 FEU) | 6 | Proceed to stepladder round 1 |
| 5 | FEU Tamaraws | 8 | 6 | .571 | 6 | |
| 6 | NU Bulldogs | 6 | 8 | .429 | 8 | |
| 7 | Adamson Soaring Falcons | 2 | 12 | .143 | 12 | |
| 8 | UP Fighting Maroons | 0 | 14 | .000 | 14 | |

Source: ABS-CBN Sports
Rules for classification: 1) winning percentage; 2) if tied for #2 or #4, one-game playoff; 3) head-to-head record; 4) head-to-head point differential; 5) overall point differential
(H) Hosts

===== Playoffs =====
Stepladder round 1 (Single-elimination)
3 | Ateneo | 69
4 | UST | 64

Stepladder round 2 (No. 2 twice-to-beat)
2 | La Salle | 64 | 65
3 | Ateneo | 65 | 60

Finals (Best-of-three playoff)
1 | UE | 63 | 64
2 | La Salle | 64 | 73

===== Awardees =====
- Most Valuable Player (Finals): JV Casio and Cholo Villanueva (La Salle; co-awardees)
- Most Valuable Player (Season): Jervy Cruz (UST)
- Rookie of the Year: JR Cawaling (FEU).

==== Women's tournament ====
===== Elimination round =====
| Pos | Team | W | L | PCT | GB | Qualification |
|---|---|---|---|---|---|---|
| 1 | Ateneo Lady Eagles | 12 | 2 | .857 | — | Twice-to-beat in the semifinals |
| 2 | UP Lady Maroons | 11 | 3 | .786 | 1 | Twice-to-beat in the semifinals |
| 3 | UST Growling Tigresses (H) | 10 | 4 | .714 | 2 | Twice-to-win in the semifinals |
| 4 | Adamson Lady Falcons | 8 | 6 | .571 | 4 | Twice-to-win in the semifinals |
| 5 | FEU Lady Tamaraws | 7 | 7 | .500 | 5 | |
| 6 | De La Salle Lady Archers | 5 | 9 | .357 | 7 | |
| 7 | UE Lady Warriors | 2 | 12 | .143 | 10 | |
| 8 | NU Lady Bulldogs | 1 | 13 | .071 | 11 | |

Rules for classification: 1) winning percentage; 2) if tied for #2 or #4, one-game playoff; 3) head-to-head record; 4) head-to-head point differential; 5) overall point differential
(H) Hosts

===== Playoffs =====
Semifinals (Top 2 twice-to-beat)
1 | Ateneo | 57
4 | Adamson | 46
2 | UP | 56
3 | UST | 54

Finals (Best-of-three playoff)
1 | Ateneo | 64 | 62
2 | UP | 60 | 58

===== Awardees =====
- Most Valuable Player (Finals):
- Most Valuable Player (Season):
- Rookie of the Year:

=== Juniors division ===
==== Boys' tournament ====
===== Elimination round =====
| Pos | Team | W | L | PCT | GB | Qualification |
|---|---|---|---|---|---|---|
| 1 | Ateneo Blue Eaglets | 13 | 1 | .929 | — | Twice-to-beat in the semifinals |
| 2 | Zobel Junior Archers | 11 | 3 | .786 | 2 | Twice-to-beat in the semifinals |
| 3 | FEU–D Baby Tamaraws | 9 | 5 | .643 | 4 | Twice-to-win in the semifinals |
| 4 | NUNS Bullpups | 6 | 8 | .429 (Note: Head-to-head record: NU 1–1 UE; fourth-seed playoff: NU 83–80) | 7 | Twice-to-win in the semifinals |
| 5 | UE Pages | 6 | 8 | .429 | 7 | |
| 6 | Adamson Baby Falcons | 5 | 9 | .357 | 8 | |
| 7 | UPIS Junior Fighting Maroons | 4 | 10 | .286 | 9 | |
| 8 | UST Tiger Cubs (H) | 2 | 12 | .143 | 11 | |

Source: ABS-CBN Sports
Rules for classification: 1) winning percentage; 2) if tied for #2 or #4, one-game playoff; 3) head-to-head record; 4) head-to-head point differential; 5) overall point differential
(H) Hosts

===== Playoffs =====
Semifinals (Top 2 twice-to-beat)
1 | Ateneo | 70 | 94
4 | NU | 73 | 75
2 | DLSZ | 67
3 | FEU–FERN | 61

Finals (Best-of-three playoff)
1 | Ateneo | 74 | 92
2 | DLSZ | 76 | 98*

*Overtime

===== Awardees =====
- Most Valuable Player (Season): Samuel Marata (UPIS)
- Rookie of the Year: Dave Kurt De Guzman (UE)

== Football ==
The UAAP Football tournament officially opened on January 12, 2008 at the Ateneo Erenchun Football Field of the Ateneo de Manila University in Katipunan Avenue, Loyola Heights Quezon City. Tournament host was Ateneo de Manila.

This year marked the introduction of high school football in the UAAP as a demonstration sport. The initial participating schools were Ateneo de Manila University, De La Salle-Santiago Zobel School, University of Santo Tomas High School and FEU - Diliman.

Three championship titles are disputed in UAAP football, one for each division, namely the men's, women's and juniors. The tournament is a double round robin elimination. A Team that sweeps both rounds automatically wins the championship. Otherwise, the number one and two ranked teams meet in the Finals round with the former having a twice-to-beat advantage over the number two team. Games in the Finals go into extra time if the score is a draw at the end of Regulation Time. The extra time consists of two 15-minute periods. If there is still no winner after the extra time, then the game will go to a penalty shootout (free kick) to decide the winner.

=== Seniors division ===
==== Men's tournament ====
Elimination round

| Team | W | D | L | Pts. |
|---|---|---|---|---|
| FEU Tamaraws | 6 | 1 | 2 | 19 |
| Ateneo Blue Eagles | 6 | 1 | 2 | 19 |
| UST Growling Tigers | 4 | 2 | 3 | 14 |
| UP Fighting Maroons | 3 | 4 | 2 | 13 |
| UE Red Warriors | 2 | 0 | 6 | 6 |
| De La Salle Green Archers | 1 | 1 | 7 | 4 |

Qualified for the Finals

==== Women's tournament ====
Elimination round

| Team | W | D | L | Pts. |
|---|---|---|---|---|
| FEU Lady Tamaraws | 5 | 1 | 2 | 16 |
| De La Salle Lady Archers | 4 | 3 | 1 | 15 |
| UST Growling Tigresses | 4 | 2 | 2 | 14 |
| Ateneo Lady Eagles | 3 | 2 | 3 | 11 |
| UP Lady Maroons | 0 | 0 | 8 | 0 |

Qualified for the Finals

=== Juniors division ===
==== Boys' tournament ====
Elimination round

| Team | W | D | L | Pts. |
|---|---|---|---|---|
| Ateneo Blue Eaglets | 5 | 0 | 1 | 15 |
| Zobel Junior Archers | 5 | 0 | 1 | 15 |
| FEU–D Baby Tamaraws | 2 | 0 | 4 | 6 |
| UST Tiger Cubs | 0 | 0 | 6 | 0 |

Qualified for the Finals

== Volleyball ==
The UAAP volleyball tournament opened on December 1, 2007 at the Blue Eagle Gym hosted by University of the Philippines. The Ateneo de Manila University Men's Volleyball Team took on University of the East Men's Volleyball as the opening game for the Season.

Men's volleyball games were mostly held at the Blue Eagle Gym and some at the Rizal Memorial Coliseum. Women's volleyball action meanwhile had its opening games at the Blue Eagle Gym and transferred to Ninoy Aquino Stadium in the succeeding games. The boys' and Girls' volleyball games were mostly held at the University of the East Gymnasium with some games held at the University of the Philippines College of Human Kinetics Gym.

=== Men's tournament ===
==== Elimination round ====
| Pos | Team | Pld | W | L | Pts | SW | SL | SR | Qualification |
|---|---|---|---|---|---|---|---|---|---|
| 1 | FEU Tamaraws | 14 | 13 | 1 | 39 (Note: First–seed playoff: FEU 3–0 UST) | 34 | 8 | 4.250 | Twice-to-beat in the semifinals |
| 2 | UST Growling Tigers (H) | 14 | 13 | 1 | 39 | 36 | 9 | 4.000 | Twice-to-beat in the semifinals |
| 3 | Adamson Soaring Falcons | 14 | 9 | 5 | 27 | 24 | 20 | 1.200 | Twice-to-win in the semifinal |
| 4 | UP Fighting Maroons | 14 | 8 | 6 | 24 | 22 | 27 | 0.815 | Twice-to-win in the semifinal |
| 5 | UE Red Warriors | 14 | 7 | 7 | 21 | 28 | 23 | 1.217 | |
| 6 | De La Salle Green Archers | 14 | 3 | 11 | 9 | 14 | 35 | 0.400 | |
| 7 | Ateneo Blue Eagles | 14 | 2 | 12 | 6 | 13 | 35 | 0.371 | |
| 8 | NU Bulldogs | 14 | 1 | 13 | 3 | 13 | 35 | 0.371 | |

Source: ABS-CBN Sports
Rules for classification: 1) number of wins; 2) if tied for top 4 seeds, or for #4 seed, one-game playoff; 3) match points; 4) sets ratio; 5) points ratio; 6) head-to-head record
(H) Host

==== Playoffs ====
1st–seed playoff
FEU | 3
UST | 0

Semifinals; Top seeds twice-to-beat
1 | FEU | 3
4 | UP | 0
2 | UST | 3
3 | Adamson | 2

Finals; Best-of-three series
1 | FEU | 1 | 3 | 2
2 | UST | 3 | 1 | 3

=== Women's tournament ===
All the won games of De La Salle from January 15, 2008 up to the time it was discovered that one of its players, Jacqueline Alarca, continued playing despite her being on leave of absence were forfeited. The UAAP rule requires a player to be enrolled while playing.

==== Elimination round ====
| Pos | Team | Pld | W | L | PCT | GB | Qualification |
|---|---|---|---|---|---|---|---|
| 1 | Adamson Lady Falcons | 14 | 12 | 2 | .857 (Note: Head-to-head sets ratio: Adamson +2, FEU –1, UST –1; second–seed playoff: FEU 3–1 UST; first–seed playoff: Adamson 3–2 FEU) | — | Twice-to-beat in the semifinals |
| 2 | FEU Lady Tamaraws | 14 | 12 | 2 | .857 | — | Twice-to-beat in the semifinals |
| 3 | UST Growling Tigresses (H) | 14 | 12 | 2 | .857 | — | Twice-to-win in the semifinals |
| 4 | Ateneo Lady Eagles | 14 | 8 | 6 | .571 | 4 | Twice-to-win in the semifinals |
| 5 | UP Lady Maroons | 14 | 4 | 10 | .286 | 8 | |
| 6 | NU Lady Bulldogs | 14 | 3 | 11 | .214 | 9 | |
| 7 | De La Salle Lady Archers (Note: All games of De La Salle from January 15 onwards were forfeited when player Jacqueline Alarca continued playing despite her school's approval of her leave of absence. This led her to cease as a De La Salle student, breaking UAAP rules that a player must be enrolled to the school the person represents.) | 14 | 3 | 11 | .214 | 9 | |
| 8 | UE Lady Warriors | 14 | 2 | 12 | .143 | 10 | |

Source: ABS-CBN Sports
Rules for classification: 1) number of wins; 2) if tied for top 4 seeds, or for #4 seed, one-game playoff; 3) match points; 4) sets ratio; 5) points ratio; 6) head-to-head record
(H) Hosts
Notes:

The three-way tie for #1 was broken as follows:

- Teams were seeded by the number of sets won ratio. Adamson held the advantage with a +2, while UST and FEU had each a –1.
- In the playoffs for the first seed, Adamson with a better win record drew a bye and waited for the winner of the UST versus FEU match.
- FEU defeated UST in 4 sets and gained the right to play Adamson for the number one seeding. UST was relegated to #3 seed.
- Adamson defeated FEU in 5 sets in their playoff for the first seed.

==== Playoffs ====
2nd–seed playoff
FEU | 3
UST | 1

1st–seed playoff
Adamson | 3
FEU | 2

Semifinals; Higher seed twice-to-beat
1 | Adamson | 3
4 | Ateneo | 0
2 | FEU | 3
3 | UST | 2

Finals; Best-of-three series
1 | Adamson | 3 | 1 | 2
2 | FEU | 2 | 3 | 3

=== Boys' tournament ===
==== Elimination round ====
| Rank | Team | W | L | GB |
|---|---|---|---|---|
| 1 | UE Red Pages | 8 | 0 | — |
| 2 | Zobel Junior Archers | 6 | 2 | 2 |
| 3 | Ateneo Blue Eaglets | 4 | 4 | 4 |
| 4 | UST Tiger Cubs | 2 | 6 | 6 |
| 5 | UPIS Junior Fighting Maroons | 0 | 8 | 8 |

UE's 8–0 sweep: awards them the title outright.

=== Girls' tournament ===
==== Elimination round ====
| Rank | Team | W | L | GB |
|---|---|---|---|---|
| 1 | UST Junior Tigresses | 6 | 0 | — |
| 2 | UE Junior Amazons | 4 | 2 | 2 |
| 3 | Zobel Junior Lady Archers | 2 | 4 | 4 |
| 4 | UPIS Junior Lady Maroons | 0 | 6 | 6 |

UST's 6–0 sweep: awards them the title outright.

== Beach Volleyball ==
The UAAP Beach Volleyball tournament started on September 8, 2007 at the University of the East Caloocan sand courts in Caloocan, Metro Manila.

=== Men's tournament ===
Team standings

| Rank | Team | W | L | GB |
|---|---|---|---|---|
| 1 | FEU Tamaraws* | 7 | 0 | -- |
| 2 | Adamson Soaring Falcons | 6 | 1 | 1 |
| 3 | UST Growling Tigers | 5 | 2 | 2 |
| 4 | UE Red Warriors | 4 | 3 | 3 |
| 5 | Ateneo Blue Eagles | 3 | 4 | 4 |
| 6 | NU Bulldogs | 2 | 5 | 5 |
| 7 | De La Salle Green Archers | 1 | 6 | 6 |
| 8 | UP Fighting Maroons | 0 | 7 | 7 |

*Clinched twice-to-beat advantage.

==== Awards ====
- Most Valuable Player:
- Rookie of the Year:

=== Women's tournament ===
Team standings

| Rank | Team | W | L | GB |
|---|---|---|---|---|
| 1 | FEU Lady Tamaraws* | 7 | 0 | -- |
| 2 | Ateneo Lady Eagles | 6 | 1 | 1 |
| 3 | UE Lady Warriors | 5 | 2 | 2 |
| 4 | Adamson Lady Falcons | 4 | 3 | 3 |
| 5 | De La Salle Lady Archers | 2 | 5 | 5 |
| 6 | UST Growling Tigresses | 2 | 5 | 5 |
| 7 | NU Lady Bulldogs | 1 | 6 | 6 |
| 8 | UP Lady Maroons | 1 | 6 | 6 |

*Clinched twice-to-beat advantage.

==== Awards ====
- Most Valuable Player: Wendy Ann Semana (FEU)
- Rookie of the Year: Shaira Gonzalez (FEU)

== Softball ==
The UAAP Softball tournament opened July 12, 2007. Games were played at the UST Open Field.

University of the Philippines Lady Maroons clinched the title automatically after sweeping the elimination round.

=== Elimination round ===
| Rank | Team | W | L | GB |
|---|---|---|---|---|
| 1 | UP Lady Maroons | 10 | 0 | -- |
| 2 | Adamson Lady Falcons | 8 | 2 | 2 |
| 3 | UST Growling Tigers | 6 | 4 | 4 |
| 4 | La Salle Lady Archers | 3 | 7 | 7 |
| 4 | UE Amazons | 3 | 7 | 7 |
| 6 | Ateneo Lady Eagles | 0 | 10 | 10 |

== Chess ==
Three championship titles were disputed in the UAAP Chess tournament.

=== Seniors division ===
==== Men's tournament ====
Team standings

| Rank | Team |
|---|---|
| 1st | FEU Tamaraws |
| 2nd | De La Salle Green Archers |
| 3rd | UP Fighting Maroons |
| 4th | UE Red Warriors |
| 5th | UST Growling Tigers |
| 6th | NU Bulldogs |
| 7th | Ateneo Blue Eagles |

==== Women's tournament ====
Team standings

| Rank | Team |
|---|---|
| 1st | UST Growling Tigresses |
| 2nd | De La Salle Lady Archers |
| 3rd | UP Lady Maroons |
| 4th | FEU Lady Tamaraws |
| 5th | UE Lady Warriors |
| 6th | NU Lady Bulldogs |
| 7th | Ateneo Lady Eagles |

=== Juniors division ===
==== Boys' tournament ====
Team standings

| Rank | Team |
|---|---|
| 1st | Adamson Baby Falcons |
| 2nd | Ateneo Blue Eaglets |
| 3rd | UE Red Pages |
| 4th | NUNS Bullpups |
| 5th | UST Tiger Cubs |
| 6th | FEU–D Baby Tamaraws |

== Taekwondo ==
The UAAP Taekwondo tournament started on September 15, 2007 at the University of Santo Tomas Gym in España Boulevard, Sampaloc, Manila.

=== Seniors division ===
==== Men's tournament ====
Team standings

| Rank | Team | W | L | GB |
|---|---|---|---|---|
| 1 | FEU Tamaraws | 5 | 0 | -- |
| 2 | UST Growling Tigers | 4 | 1 | 1 |
| 3 | Ateneo Blue Eagles | 3 | 2 | 2 |
| 4 | De La Salle Green Archers | 2 | 3 | 3 |
| 5 | UP Fighting Maroons | 1 | 4 | 4 |
| 6 | UE Red Warriors | 0 | 5 | 5 |

==== Women's tournament ====
Team standings

| Rank | Team | W | L | GB |
|---|---|---|---|---|
| 1 | UST Growling Tigresses | 5 | 0 | - |
| 2 | UP Lady Maroons | 4 | 1 | 1 |
| 3 | FEU Lady Tamaraws | 3 | 2 | 2 |
| 4 | Ateneo Lady Eagles | 2 | 3 | 3 |
| 5 | De La Salle Lady Archers | 1 | 4 | 4 |
| 6 | UE Lady Warriors | 0 | 5 | 5 |

=== Juniors division ===
==== Boys' tournament ====
Team standings

| Rank | Team | W | L | GB |
|---|---|---|---|---|
| 1 | UST Tiger Cubs | - | - | - |
| 2 | Ateneo Blue Eaglets | - | - | - |
| 3 | UPIS Junior Fighting Maroons | - | - | - |
| 4 | FEU–D Baby Tamaraws | - | - | - |
| 5 | UE Red Pages | - | - | - |
| 6 | Zobel Junior Archers | - | - | - |

== Table Tennis ==
The UAAP Table Tennis tournament started on September 18, 2007 at the Ateneo de Manila University Blue Eagle Gym in Katipunan Avenue, Loyola Heights, Quezon City.

=== Seniors division ===
==== Men's tournament ====
Team standings

| Rank | Team | GP | W | L | PCT |
|---|---|---|---|---|---|
| 1 | FEU Tamaraws | 6 | 5 | 1 | .833 |
| 2 | UST Growling Tigers | 6 | 5 | 1 | .833 |
| 3 | UP Fighting Maroons | 6 | 4 | 2 | .667 |
| 4 | UE Red Warriors | 6 | 4 | 2 | .667 |
| 5 | De La Salle Green Archers | 6 | 2 | 4 | .333 |
| 6 | NU Bulldogs | 6 | 1 | 5 | .167 |
| 7 | Ateneo Blue Eagles | 6 | 0 | 6 | .000 |

==== Women's tournament ====
Team standings

| Rank | Team | GP | W | L | PCT |
|---|---|---|---|---|---|
| 1 | FEU Lady Tamaraws | 5 | 5 | 0 | 1.000 |
| 2 | UST Growling Tigresses | 5 | 4 | 1 | .800 |
| 3 | UP Lady Maroons | 5 | 3 | 2 | .600 |
| 4 | Ateneo Lady Eagles | 5 | 2 | 3 | .400 |
| 5 | De La Salle Lady Archers | 5 | 2 | 3 | .400 |
| 6 | NU Bulldogs | 5 | 0 | 5 | .000 |

=== Juniors division ===
==== Boys' tournament ====
Team standings

| Rank | Team | GP | W | L | PCT |
|---|---|---|---|---|---|
| 1 | UST Tiger Cubs | 6 | 6 | 0 | 1.000 |
| 2 | UE Red Pages | 6 | 5 | 1 | .833 |
| 3 | Ateneo Blue Eaglets | 6 | 4 | 2 | .667 |
| 4 | NUNS Bullpups | 6 | 3 | 3 | .500 |
| 5 | Adamson Baby Falcons | 6 | 2 | 4 | .333 |
| 6 | UPIS Junior Fighting Maroons | 6 | 1 | 5 | .167 |
| 7 | Zobel Junior Archers | 6 | 0 | 6 | .000 |

== Swimming ==
The UAAP Season 70 Swimming Championships was held on September 20–23, 2007 at the Trace Aquatics Centre in Los Baños, Laguna.

Team ranking is determined by a point system, similar to that of the overall championship. The points given are based on the swimmer's/team's finish in the finals of an event, which include only the top eight finishers from the preliminaries. The gold medalist(s) receive 15 points, silver gets 12, bronze has 10. The following points: 8, 6, 4, 2 and 1 are given to the rest of the participating swimmers/teams according to their order of finish.

=== Seniors division ===
==== Men's tournament ====
| Rank | Team | Medals | | | | Points |
|---|---|---|---|---|---|---|
| Rank | Team | 1st place, gold medalist(s) | 2nd place, silver medalist(s) | 3rd place, bronze medalist(s) | Total | Points |
| 1 | UP | 0 | 3 | 1 | 4 | 56 |
| 2 | La Salle | 3 | 1 | 1 | 5 | 51 |
| 3 | Ateneo | 0 | 1 | 2 | 3 | 37 |
| 4 | UST | 2 | 0 | 1 | 3 | 33 |

==== Women's tournament ====
| Rank | Team | Medals | | | | Points |
|---|---|---|---|---|---|---|
| Rank | Team | 1st place, gold medalist(s) | 2nd place, silver medalist(s) | 3rd place, bronze medalist(s) | Total | Points |
| 1 | UST | 0 | 3 | 1 | 4 | 56 |
| 2 | UP | 2 | 1 | 2 | 5 | 55 |
| 3 | Ateneo | 2 | 1 | 1 | 4 | 48 |
| 4 | La Salle | 1 | 0 | 1 | 2 | 16 |
| 5 | UE | 0 | 0 | 0 | 0 | 4 |

=== Juniors division ===
==== Boys' tournament ====
| Rank | Team | Medals | | | | Points |
|---|---|---|---|---|---|---|
| Rank | Team | 1st place, gold medalist(s) | 2nd place, silver medalist(s) | 3rd place, bronze medalist(s) | Total | Points |
| 1 | Ateneo | 29 | 11 | 11 | 41 | 386 |
| 2 | UST | | | | | 170 |
| 3 | DLSZ | | | | | 100 |
| 4 | UPIS | 0 | 12 | 3 | 15 | - |
| 5 | UE | | | | | - |

==== Girls' tournament ====
| Rank | Team | Medals | | | | Points |
|---|---|---|---|---|---|---|
| Rank | Team | 1st place, gold medalist(s) | 2nd place, silver medalist(s) | 3rd place, bronze medalist(s) | Total | Points |
| 1 | UPIS | 11 | 14 | 15 | - | - |
| 2 | UST | - | - | - | - | - |
| 3 | UE | - | - | - | - | - |
| 4 | DLSZ | - | - | - | - | - |

== Judo ==
The UAAP Judo tournament started on October 6, 2007 and ended on October 7, 2007 at the Blue Eagle Gym of the Ateneo de Manila University in Katipunan Avenue, Loyola Heights, Quezon City.

=== Seniors division ===
==== Men's tournament ====
| Rank | Team | Medals | | | | Points |
|---|---|---|---|---|---|---|
| Rank | Team | 1st place, gold medalist(s) | 2nd place, silver medalist(s) | 3rd place, bronze medalist(s) | Total | Points |
| 1 | UP | 3 | 1 | 1 | 5 | 37 |
| 2 | UST | 0 | 2 | 3 | 5 | 16 |
| 3 | La Salle | 1 | 0 | 1 | 2 | 12 |
| 4 | Ateneo | 0 | 1 | 2 | 3 | 9 |

==== Women's tournament ====
| Rank | Team | Medals | | | | Points |
|---|---|---|---|---|---|---|
| Rank | Team | 1st place, gold medalist(s) | 2nd place, silver medalist(s) | 3rd place, bronze medalist(s) | Total | Points |
| 1 | UP | 4 | 3 | 0 | 7 | 55 |
| 2 | Ateneo | 0 | 1 | 2 | 3 | 9 |
| 3 | La Salle | 0 | 0 | 2 | 2 | 4 |
| 4 | UST | 0 | 0 | 2 | 2 | 4 |
| 5 | UE | 0 | 0 | 1 | 1 | 2 |

=== Juniors division ===
==== Boys' tournament ====
| Rank | Team | Medals | | | | Points |
|---|---|---|---|---|---|---|
| Rank | Team | 1st place, gold medalist(s) | 2nd place, silver medalist(s) | 3rd place, bronze medalist(s) | Total | Points |
| 1 | Ateneo | 7 | 4 | 5 | 16 | 121 |
| 2 | UST | 1 | 1 | 2 | 4 | 37 |
| 3 | UPIS | 0 | 2 | 0 | 2 | 28 |
| 4 | DLSZ | 0 | 0 | 0 | 0 | 6 |
| 5 | UE | 0 | 0 | 0 | 0 | 4 |

== Cheerdance ==
The 2007 Cheerdance Competition was held on September 16, 2007 at the Araneta Coliseum, Araneta Center, Cubao, Quezon City. Cheer dance competition is an exhibition event. Points for the general championship are not awarded to the participants.

The UP Pep Squad clinched their fourth UAAP cheerdance title after 5 years. UST settled for second place, and the third place went to FEU.

| Rank | Pep squad | Score |
|---|---|---|
| 1st | UP Pep Squad | 92.66 |
| 2nd | UST Salinggawi Dance Troupe | 92.16 |
| 3rd | FEU Cheering Squad | 91.66 |
| 4th | Ateneo Blue Babble Battalion | 91.63 |
| 5th | Adamson Pep Squad | 91.62 |
| 6th | UE Cheering Squad | 91.55 |
| 7th | DLSU Pep Squad | 89.54 |
| 8th | NU Pep Squad | 84.23 |

== General championship summary ==
The general champion is determined by a point system. The system gives 15 points to the champion team of a UAAP event, 12 to the runner-up, and 10 to the third placer. The following points: 8, 6, 4, 2 and 1 are given to the rest of the participating teams according to their order of finish.

=== Medals table ===
==== Seniors' division ====
| Rank | Team | Gold | Silver | Bronze | Total |
|---|---|---|---|---|---|
| 1 | Far Eastern University | 10 | 3 | 3 | 16 |
| 2 | University of Santo Tomas* | 9 | 7 | 7 | 23 |
| 3 | University of the Philippines Diliman | 4 | 2 | 8 | 14 |
| 4 | De La Salle University | 2 | 4 | 2 | 8 |
| 5 | Ateneo de Manila University | 1 | 6 | 4 | 11 |
| 6 | University of the East | 1 | 3 | 3 | 7 |
| 7 | Adamson University | 1 | 3 | 1 | 5 |
| 8 | National University | 0 | 0 | 0 | 0 |
| Totals (8 entries) | | 28 | 28 | 28 | 84 |

* Host nation (Season host); General champions
Notes: Results are final.

==== Juniors' division ====
| Rank | Team | Gold | Silver | Bronze | Total |
|---|---|---|---|---|---|
| 1 | University of Santo Tomas* | 4 | 2 | 0 | 6 |
| 2 | Ateneo de Manila University | 1 | 4 | 2 | 7 |
| 3 | University of the East | 1 | 2 | 2 | 5 |
| 4 | De La Salle Zobel | 1 | 1 | 2 | 4 |
| 5 | UP Integrated School | 1 | 0 | 2 | 3 |
| 6 | Adamson University | 1 | 0 | 0 | 1 |
| 7 | Far Eastern University–FERN College | 0 | 0 | 1 | 1 |
| 8 | National University | 0 | 0 | 0 | 0 |
| Totals (8 entries) | | 9 | 9 | 9 | 27 |

* Host nation (Season host); General champions
Notes: Results are final.

=== General championship tally ===
==== Seniors' division ====
| | | Basketball | | Volleyball (indoor) | | Volleyball (beach) | | Swimming | | Chess | | Tennis | | Table tennis | | Badminton | | Taekwondo | | Judo | | Baseball | Softball | Football | | Athletics | | Fencing | | Total | | |
| Rank | Team | M | W | M | W | M | W | M | W | M | W | M | W | M | W | M | W | M | W | M | W | M | W | M | W | M | W | M | W | M | W | Overall |
|---|---|---|---|---|---|---|---|---|---|---|---|---|---|---|---|---|---|---|---|---|---|---|---|---|---|---|---|---|---|---|---|---|
| 1 | UST (H) | 8 | 10 | 15 | 10 | 10 | 2 | 12 | 15 | 6 | 15 | 15 | 15 | 15 | 12 | 8 | 15 | 12 | 15 | 12 | 10 | 12 | 10 | 10 | 10 | 12 | 12 | 15 | 8 | 162 | 159 | 321 |
| 2 | UP | 1 | 12 | 8 | 6 | 1 | 1 | 15 | 10 | 10 | 10 | 10 | 10 | 8 | 10 | 6 | 8 | 6 | 12 | 15 | 15 | 10 | 15 | 8 | 6 | 6 | 6 | 8 | 10 | 112 | 131 | 243 |
| 3 | FEU | 6 | 6 | 12 | 15 | 15 | 15 | — | — | 15 | 8 | — | — | 12 | 15 | 10 | 12 | 15 | 10 | — | — | — | — | 15 | 15 | 15 | 15 | 10 | 6 | 125 | 117 | 242 |
| 4 | Ateneo | 10 | 15 | 2 | 8 | 6 | 12 | 8 | 12 | 2 | 2 | 8 | 12 | 2 | 4 | 4 | 4 | 10 | 8 | 10 | 12 | 6 | 4 | 12 | 8 | 10 | 4 | 6 | 12 | 96 | 117 | 213 |
| 5 | La Salle | 15 | 4 | 4 | 2 | 2 | 4 | 10 | 8 | 12 | 12 | 12 | 8 | 4 | 6 | 15 | 10 | 8 | 6 | 8 | 8 | 4 | 6 | 4 | 12 | 4 | 8 | 4 | 4 | 106 | 98 | 204 |
| 6 | UE | 12 | 2 | 6 | 1 | 8 | 10 | 6 | 6 | 8 | 6 | 6 | — | 10 | 8 | 12 | 2 | 4 | 4 | 6 | 6 | — | 8 | 6 | — | 8 | 10 | 12 | 15 | 104 | 78 | 182 |
| 7 | Adamson | 2 | 8 | 10 | 12 | 12 | 8 | — | — | — | — | — | — | — | — | 2 | 6 | — | — | — | — | 15 | 12 | — | — | — | — | — | — | 41 | 46 | 87 |
| 8 | NU | 4 | 1 | 1 | 4 | 4 | 6 | — | — | 4 | 4 | — | — | 6 | 2 | — | 1 | — | — | — | — | 8 | — | — | — | — | — | — | — | 27 | 18 | 45 |

(H) Season host; = Champion; = Runner-up; = Third place; — = No team.
Notes: Results are final.

==== Juniors' division ====
| | | Basketball | Volleyball (indoor) | | Swimming | | Chess | Table tennis | Taekwondo | Athletics | Total | | | | |
| Rank | Team | B | B | G | B | G | C | B | B | B | B | G | C | K | Overall |
|---|---|---|---|---|---|---|---|---|---|---|---|---|---|---|---|
| 1 | UST (H) | 1 | 8 | 15 | 12 | 12 | 6 | 15 | 15 | 15 | 66 | 27 | 6 | 0 | 99 |
| 2 | Ateneo | 12 | 10 | — | 15 | — | 12 | 10 | 12 | 12 | 71 | 0 | 12 | 0 | 83 |
| 2 | UE | 6 | 15 | 12 | 6 | 10 | 10 | 12 | 6 | 6 | 51 | 22 | 10 | 0 | 83 |
| 4 | UPIS | 2 | 6 | 8 | 8 | 15 | — | 6 | 10 | 10 | 42 | 23 | 0 | 0 | 65 |
| 5 | DLSZ | 15 | 12 | 10 | 10 | 8 | — | — | 4 | — | 41 | 18 | 0 | 0 | 59 |
| 6 | FEU–FERN | 10 | — | — | — | — | 4 | — | 8 | 8 | 26 | 0 | 4 | 0 | 30 |
| 7 | Adamson | 4 | — | — | — | — | 15 | 4 | — | 4 | 12 | 0 | 15 | 0 | 27 |
| 8 | NU | 8 | — | — | — | — | 8 | 8 | — | — | 16 | 0 | 8 | 0 | 24 |

(H) Season host; = Champion; = Runner-up; = Third place; — = No team.
Notes: Results are final.

== Individual awards ==
Athletes of the Year:

- Seniors': Michelle Bruzola (UE Lady Warriors, fencing)
- Juniors': Sabrina Ingrid Ilustre (UE Junior Lady Warriors, swimming)

== See also ==
- NCAA Season 83
