= UAAP Season 69 volleyball tournaments =

Volleyball tournaments

UAAP Season 69 seniors' volleyball
- Host school: University of the Philippines, Diliman
Men's Finals	G1	G2	Wins
FEU Tamaraws	3	3	2
UP Fighting Maroons	1	1	0
- Duration: February 18–21, 2007
- Arena(s): Ateneo Blue Eagle Gym
- Finals MVP: Edjet Mabbayad
- Winning coach: George Pascua
- Semifinalists: UST Growling Tigers; NU Bulldogs
- TV network(s): Studio 23
Women's Finals	G1	G2	Wins
UST Growling Tigresses	3	3	2
FEU Lady Tamaraws	1	0	0
- Duration: February 18–21, 2007
- Arena(s): Ateneo Blue Eagle Gym
- Finals MVP: Venus Bernal
- Winning coach: August Sta. Maria
- Semifinalists: Adamson Lady Falcons; UE Lady Warriors
- TV network(s): Studio 23

The volleyball tournaments of UAAP Season 69 ran from December 3, 2006 to February 21, 2007 at various locations within Metro Manila which include Rizal Memorial Coliseum, University of The Philippines Human Kinetics Gym and Ateneo Blue Eagle Gym.

== Men's tournament ==
=== Elimination round ===
Pos	Team	Pld	W	L	Pts	SW	SL	SR	Qualification
1	FEU Tamaraws	12	11 (Note: First–seed playoff: FEU 3–2 UP)	1	33	34	8	4.250	Twice-to-beat in the semifinals
2	UP Fighting Maroons (H)	12	11	1	33	34	8	4.250	Twice-to-beat in the semifinals
3	UST Growling Tigers	12	8	4	24	27	17	1.588	Twice-to-win in the semifinals
4	NU Bulldogs	12	5	7	15	20	26	0.769	Twice-to-win in the semifinals
5	Ateneo Blue Eagles	12	3	9	9	19	27	0.704	
6	Adamson Soaring Falcons	12	2	10	6	14	32	0.438	
7	UE Red Warriors	12	2	10	6	9	35	0.257	
8	De La Salle Green Archers	0	0	0	0	0	0	—	Suspended

Source: ABS-CBN Sports
Rules for classification: 1) number of wins; 2) if tied for top 4 seeds, or for #4 seed, one-game playoff; 3) match points; 4) sets ratio; 5) points ratio; 6) head-to-head record
(H) Host

=== Bracket ===
1st–seed playoff
FEU	3
UP	2

Semifinals; Top seeds twice-to-beat
1	FEU	3
4	NU	0
2	UP	1	3
3	UST	3	1

Finals; Best-of-three series
1	FEU	3	3
2	UP	1	1

=== First seed playoff ===
Date		Score		Set 1	Set 2	Set 3	Set 4	Set 5	Total
Feb 7	FEU Tamaraws	3–2	UP Fighting Maroons	25–17	21–25	26–24	20–25	15–13	107–104

=== Semifinals ===
==== FEU vs. NU ====
Date		Score		Set 1	Set 2	Set 3	Set 4	Set 5	Total
Feb 11	FEU Tamaraws	3–0	NU Bulldogs	25–20	25–16	25–21	–	–	75–57
FEU advances to the Finals

==== UP vs. UST ====
Date		Score		Set 1	Set 2	Set 3	Set 4	Set 5	Total
Feb 11	UP Fighting Maroons	1–3	UST Growling Tigers	16–25	23–25	25–19	23–25	–	87–94
Feb 14	UP Fighting Maroons	3–1	UST Growling Tigers	25–23	25–20	25–27	25–20	–	100–90
UP advances to the Finals

=== Finals ===
Date		Score		Set 1	Set 2	Set 3	Set 4	Set 5	Total
Feb 18	UP Fighting Maroons	1–3	FEU Tamaraws	16–25	22–25	25–23	20–25	–	83–98
Feb 21	UP Fighting Maroons	1–3	FEU Tamaraws	18–25	26–24	19–25	23–25	–	86–99
FEU wins series 2–0

=== Awards ===
* Most valuable player: Edjet Mabbayad (FEU Tamaraws)

- Rookie of the Year: Marlon Macabulos (UST Growling Tigers)
- Best scorer: Jerome Liñgo (UP Fighting Maroons)
- Best spiker: Jeremy Pedregosa (FEU Tamaraws)
- Best blocker: Lloyd Belgado (UP Fighting Maroons)
- Best setter: Guarenio Gianan (UP Fighting Maroons)
- Best server: Jessie Lopez (FEU Tamaraws)
- Best receiver: Mark Sibug (FEU Tamaraws)
- Best digger: Virgilio Vizcarra (UP Fighting Maroons)

== Women's tournament ==
=== Elimination round ===
Pos	Team	Pld	W	L	Pts	SW	SL	SR	Qualification
1	FEU Lady Tamaraws	12	11 (Note: First–seed playoff: UST 2–3 FEU)	1	33	34	6	5.667	Twice-to-beat in the semifinals
2	UST Growling Tigresses	12	11	1	33	32	4	8.000	Twice-to-beat in the semifinals
3	Adamson Lady Falcons	12	8	4	24	29	15	1.933	Twice-to-win in the semifinals
4	UE Amazons	12	5	7	15	17	20	0.850	Twice-to-win in the semifinals
5	Ateneo Lady Eagles	12	4	8	12	20	23	0.870	
6	UP Lady Maroons (H)	12	3	9	9	12	28	0.429	
7	NU Lady Bulldogs	12	0	12	0	0	36	0.000	
8	De La Salle Lady Archers	0	0	0	0	0	0	—	Suspended

Source: ABS-CBN Sports
(H) Host

=== Bracket ===
1st–seed playoff
UST	2
FEU	3

Semifinals; Top seeds twice-to-beat
1	FEU	3
4	UE	0
2	UST	1	3
3	Adamson	3	0

Finals; Best-of-three series
1	FEU	1	0
2	UST	3	3

=== First seed playoff ===
Date		Score		Set 1	Set 2	Set 3	Set 4	Set 5	Total
Feb 7	UST Growling Tigresses	2–3	FEU Lady Tamaraws	22–25	25–22	21–25	27–25	11–15	106–112

=== Semifinals ===
==== FEU vs. UE ====
Date		Score		Set 1	Set 2	Set 3	Set 4	Set 5	Total
Feb 11	FEU Lady Tamaraws	3-0	UE Amazons	25–9	25–18	25–19	–	–	75–46
FEU advances to the Finals

==== UST vs. AdU ====
Date		Score		Set 1	Set 2	Set 3	Set 4	Set 5	Total
Feb 11	UST Growling Tigresses	1–3	Adamson Lady Falcons	18–25	19–25	25–23	23–25	–	85–98
Feb 14	UST Growling Tigresses	3–0	Adamson Lady Falcons	25–13	25–18	25–13	–	–	75–44
UST advances to the Finals

=== Finals ===
Date		Score		Set 1	Set 2	Set 3	Set 4	Set 5	Total
Feb 18	FEU Lady Tamaraws	1–3	UST Growling Tigresses	14–25	20–25	25–23	20–25	–	79–98
Feb 21	FEU Lady Tamaraws	0–3	UST Growling Tigresses	11–25	22–25	19–25	–	–	52–75
UST wins series 2–0

=== Awards ===
* Most valuable player: Venus Bernal (UST Growling Tigresses)

- Rookie of the Year: Mecaila Morada (FEU Lady Tamaraws)
- Best scorer: Venus Bernal (UST Growling Tigresses)
- Best spiker: Mary Ann Manalo (FEU Lady Tamaraws)
- Best blocker: Bea Sharmaine Pascual (Ateneo Lady Eagles)
- Best setter: Denise Patricia Tan (UST Growling Tigresses)
- Best server: Rachel Daquis (FEU Lady Tamaraws)
- Best receiver: Donaleil Adajar (Adamson Lady Falcons)
- Best digger: Patricia Lynn Taganas (Ateneo Lady Eagles)
