= List of Spikers' Turf award recipients =

Spikers' Turf presents multiple awards at every conference to recognize its players for their accomplishments. These include two Most Valuable Player awards and seven positional awards.

Until 2025, the league doesn't give out awards for performance in a full season or across multiple conference. Since then, the Premier Volleyball League (PVL) Press Corps have given annual awards through its PVL Press Corps Awards Night.

== Most Valuable Player awards ==
Award	First awarded	Description	Most recent winner	Ref.
Most Valuable Player	2015	Awarded to the best performing player of a Spikers' Turf conference.	Jude Garcia (Criss Cross King Crunchers)	
Finals Most Valuable Player	2015	Awarded to the best performing player of a Spikers' Turf Finals series.	Jude Garcia (Criss Cross King Crunchers)	

== Positional awards ==
	Denotes player who is still active in the Spikers' Turf
Player (#)	Denotes the number of times the player has been awarded
**Player** **(in bold text)**	Indicates the player who won the Conference MVP in the same conference
Player (in italic text)	Indicates the player who won the Finals MVP in the same conference

Season	Conference	Awards						
Season	Conference	1st Best Outside Hitter	2nd Best Outside Hitter	1st Best Middle Blocker	2nd Best Middle Blocker	Best Opposite Hitter	Best Setter	Best Libero
2015	Open	(Philippines); **Marck Espejo** (Cagayan Valley)	(Philippines); John Paul Torres (PLDT)	(Philippines); Reyson Fuentes (Cignal)	(Philippines); Peter Torres (Cagayan Valley)	(Philippines); Mark Gil Alfafara (PLDT)	(Philippines); Jessie Lopez (Air Force)	(Philippines); Erickson Ramos (Cagayan Valley)
2015	Collegiate	(Philippines); Howard Mojica (EAC)	(Philippines); **Marck Espejo (2)** (Ateneo)	(Philippines); Kim Malabunga (NU)	(Philippines); Reyson Fuentes (2) (NCBA)	(Philippines); Ysrael Marasigan (Ateneo)	(Philippines); April Pagtalunan (EAC)	(Philippines); Ricky Marcos (NU)
2015	Reinforced	(Philippines); **Mark Gil Alfafara** (2) (PLDT)	(Philippines); Nur Amid Madsairi (Navy)	(Philippines); Peter Torres (2) (PLDT)	(Philippines); Reyson Fuentes (3) (Air Force)	(Philippines); Reuben Inaudito (Air Force)	(Philippines); Glacy Ralph Diezmo (Cignal)	(Philippines); Sandy Montero (Cignal)
2016	Open	(Philippines); Raymark Woo (Cignal)	(Philippines); Fauzi Ismail (Air Force)	(Philippines); **Gregorio Dolor** (IEM)	(Philippines); Herschel Ramos (Cignal)	(Philippines); Rodolfo Labrador (Air Force)	(Philippines); Jessie Lopez (2) (Air Force)	(Philippines); Juvie Mangaring (Sta. Elena)
2016	Collegiate	(Philippines); **Marck Espejo (3)** (Ateneo)	(Philippines); Raymark Woo (2) (La Salle)	(Philippines); Rafael del Pilar (La Salle)	(Philippines); Kim Malabunga (2) (NU)	(Philippines); Madzlan Gampong (NU)	(Philippines); Esmilzo Polvorosa (Ateneo)	(Philippines); Lester Sawal (UST)
2016	Reinforced	(Philippines); **Howard Mojica (2)** (Air Force)	(Philippines); Lorenzo Capate Jr. (Cignal)	(Philippines); Kheeno Franco (IEM)	(Philippines); Peter Torres (3) (Cignal)	(Philippines); Berlin Paglinawan (Champion)	(Philippines); Jessie Lopez (3) (Air Force)	(Philippines); Sandy Montero (2) (Cignal)
2018	Open	(Philippines); Alnakran Abdilla (Air Force)	(Philippines); **Bryan Bagunas** (Sta. Elena-NU)	(Philippines); Peter Torres (4) (Cignal)	(Philippines); Jayvee Sumagaysay (PLDT)	(Philippines); Ysrael Marasigan (2) (Cignal)	(Philippines); Ronchette Villegas (PLDT)	(Philippines); Ricky Marcos (2) (Sta. Elena-NU)
2019	Reinforced	(Philippines); **Alnakran Abdilla (2)** (Air Force)	(Philippines); Marck Espejo (4) (Cignal)	(Philippines); Berhashidin Daymil (Sta. Elena)	(Philippines); Kim Malabunga (3) (Air Force)	(Philippines); John Vic De Guzman (PLDT)	(Philippines); Vince Mangulabnan (Cignal)	(Philippines); Manuel Sumanguid III (Cignal)
2019	Open	(Philippines); Alnakran Abdilla (3) (Air Force)	(Philippines); Marck Espejo (5) (Cignal)	(Philippines); Francis Saura (Air Force)	(Philippines); Anjo Pertierra (Cignal)	(Philippines); **Ysrael Marasigan** (3) (Cignal)	(Philippines); Joshua Retamar (Sta. Elena-NU)	(Philippines); Ricky Marcos (3) (Sta. Elena-NU)
2022	Open	(Philippines); Marck Espejo (6) (Cignal)	(Philippines); Benedict San Andres (VNS)	(Democratic Republic of the Congo); Obed Mukaba (NU-Sta. Elena)	(Philippines); JP Bugaoan (Cignal)	(Philippines); Ysrael Marasigan (4) (Cignal)	(Philippines); Joshua Retamar (2) (NU-Sta. Elena)	(Philippines); Manuel Sumanguid III (2) (Cignal)
2023	Open	(Philippines); Jade Alex Disquitado (D' Navigators)	(Philippines); Wendell Miguel (Cignal)	(Philippines); JP Bugaoan (2) (Cignal)	(Nigeria) (Philippines); Mfena Gwaza (D' Navigators)	(Philippines); Ysrael Marasigan (5) (Cignal)	(Philippines); Michael Apolonario (D' Navigators)	(Philippines); Manuel Sumanguid III (3) (Cignal)
2023	Invitational	(Philippines); Joshua Umandal (Cignal)	(Philippines); John Bautista (Saints and Lattes-Letran)	(Philippines); JP Bugaoan (3) (Cignal)	(Philippines); **Vince Himzon** (Saints and Lattes-Letran)	(Philippines); Leo Ordiales (Sta. Elena-NU)	(Philippines); Joshua Retamar (3) (NU-Sta. Elena)	(Philippines); Manuel Sumanguid III (4) (Cignal)
2024	Open	(Philippines); Joshua Umandal (2) (Cignal)	(Philippines); Gregorio Dolor (2) (PGJC-Navy)	(Philippines); Peter Quiel (PGJC-Navy)	(Philippines); Abdurasad Nursiddik (D' Navigators)	(Philippines); Francis Saura (2) (D' Navigators)	(Philippines); Kris Cian Silang (Cignal)	(Philippines); Jack Kalingking (PGJC-Navy)
2024	Invitational	(Philippines); Nico Almendras (Criss Cross)	(Philippines); Sherwin Caritativo (Savouge)	(Philippines); Gian Glorioso (Criss Cross)	(Philippines); Giles Torres (Savouge)	(Philippines); Zhydryx Saavedra (DN Steel-FEU)	(Philippines); Ish Polvorosa (2) (Criss Cross)	(Philippines); Vince Lorenzo (Cignal)
2025	Open	(Philippines); Mark Calado (Savouge)	(Philippines); Sherwin Caritativo (2) (Savouge)	(Philippines); JP Bugaoan (4) (Cignal)	(Philippines); Gian Glorioso (2) (Criss Cross)	(United States) (Philippines); Steven Rotter (Cignal)	(Philippines); Ish Polvorosa (3) (Criss Cross)	(Philippines); Vince Lorenzo (2) (Cignal)
2025	Invitational	(Philippines); **Jude Garcia** (Criss Cross)	(Philippines); Joshua Umandal (3) (Cignal)	(Philippines); Giles Torres (2) (Savouge)	(Philippines); Edlyn Colinares (Criss Cross)	(Japan); Ryutaro Aun (Kindai)	(Philippines); Adrian Villados (Criss Cross)	(Japan); Yuito Kose (Kindai)
2026	Open	(Philippines); Alche Gupiteo (Criss Cross)	(Philippines); Sherwin Caritativo (3) (Savouge)	(Philippines); JP Bugaoan (5) (Savouge)	(Philippines); Lloyd Josafat (Criss Cross)	(Philippines); **Jude Garcia** (2) (Criss Cross)	(Philippines); Adrian Villados (2) (Criss Cross)	(Philippines); Vince Lorenzo (3) (AEP)

== Most-awarded players ==
Below is the table for the most awarded players in the league's history (2015–2016; 2018–present):

Rank	Name	Current / Last team	Position	Years playing in Spikers' Turf		MVP award	Positional award	Total
Rank	Name	Current / Last team	Position	From	To	MVP award	Positional award	Total
1	Marck Jesus Espejo	Criss Cross	OH	2015	present	7	6	13
2	Jude Garcia	Criss Cross	OP	2018	present	6	2	8
3	Ysrael Wilson Marasigan	Criss Cross	OP	2015	present	1	5	6
4	Alnakran Abdilla	Air Force	OH	2015	2024	2	3	5
4	John Paul Bugaoan	Savouge	MB	2019	present	0	5	5
5	Bryan Bagunas	Osaka Bluteon (Japan)	OH	2015	2024	3	1	4
5	Mark Alfafara	PLDT	OH	2015	2019	2	2	4
5	Joshua Umandal	Alpha Insurance	OH	2022	present	1	3	4
5	Peter Den Mar Torres	Cignal	MB	2015	2023	0	4	4
5	Manuel Sumanguid III	Criss Cross	L	2015	present	0	4	4

== See also ==
- List of Shakey's V-League award recipients
- List of Premier Volleyball League award recipients
