= Spikers' Turf Elite Team =

Spikers' Turf award

The Spikers' Turf Elite Team is a group of seven Spikers' Turf awards given out each conference to the best-performing player or players in each position. These include two awards each for Best Outside Hitters and Best Middle Blockers, and one award each for Best Opposite Hitter, Best Setter, and Best Libero. Since 2025, the PVL Press Corps have selected an annual Mythical Team under similar principles.

John Paul Bugaoan and Marck Espejo are tied for most selections with eight each. Four players are tied for the second most with five: Kim Malabunga, Ysay Marasigan, Manuel Sumanguid III, and Joshua Umandal. In the Mythical Team, Jude Garcia and Giles Torres are the only players with multiple selections.

== Key ==
^	Denotes player who is still active in Spikers' Turf
Player (#)	Denotes the number of times the player has been named to an Elite Team or Mythical Team
**Player** **(in bold text)**	Indicates the player who won Most Valuable Player in the same conference or Most Valuable Player of the Season in the same season

== Mythical Team ==
=== Winners ===
Season	Best Outside Hitters		Best Middle Blockers		Best Opposite Hitter	Best Setter	Best Libero	Ref.
2024–25	Sherwin Caritativo^ (Savouge)	**Jude Garcia**^ (Criss Cross)	Gian Glorioso^ (Criss Cross)	Giles Torres^ (Savouge)	Steve Rotter (Cignal)	Ish Polvoroza^ (Criss Cross)	Vince Lorenzo^ (Cignal)	
2025–26	**Jude Garcia**^ (2) (Criss Cross)	Noel Kampton (Criss Cross)	John Paul Bugaoan^ (Savouge)	Giles Torres^ (2) (Savouge)	Mark Calado^ (Savouge)	Adrian Villados (Criss Cross)	John Philip Pepito (Criss Cross)	

=== Most selections ===
The following table only lists players with at least two total selections.

Player	Pos. (Note: The positions listed reflect which ones the player earned a selection for, with the most-awarded position listed first.)	Total
(Philippines) Jude Garcia	OH	**2**
(Philippines) Giles Torres	MB	**2**

== Winners ==
=== 2015 to 2023 ===
From 2015 to 2023, the two Best Outside Hitters and two best Middle Blockers were ranked first and second.

Season	Conference	1st Best Outside Hitter	2nd Best Outside Hitter	1st Best Middle Blocker	2nd Best Middle Blocker	Best Opposite Hitter	Best Setter	Best Libero	Ref.
2015	Open	**Marck Espejo** (Cagayan Valley)	John Paul Torres (PLDT)	Reyson Fuentes (Cignal)	Peter Torres (Cagayan Valley)	Mark Gil Alfafara (PLDT)	Jessie Lopez (Air Force)	Erickson Ramos (Cagayan Valley)	
2015	Collegiate	Howard Mojica (EAC)	**Marck Espejo** (2) (Ateneo)	Kim Malabunga^ (NU)	Reyson Fuentes (2) (De La Salle)	Ysay Marasigan^ (Ateneo)	April Pagtalunan (EAC)	Ricky Marcos (NU)	
2015	Reinforced	**Mark Gil Alfafara** (2) (PLDT)	Nur Amid Madsairi (Navy)	Peter Torres (2) (PLDT)	Reyson Fuentes (3) (Air Force)	Reuben Inaudito (Air Force)	Glacy Ralph Diezmo (Cignal)	Sandy Montero^ (Cignal)	
2016	Open	Raymark Woo (Cignal)	Fauzi Ismail (Air Force)	**Greg Dolor**^ (IEM)	Herschel Ramos (Cignal)	Rodolfo Labrador (Air Force)	Jessie Lopez (2) (Air Force)	Juvie Mangaring (Sta. Elena)	
2016	Collegiate	**Marck Espejo** (3) (Ateneo)	Raymark Woo (De La Salle)	Rafael del Pilar (De La Salle)	Kim Malabunga^ (2) (NU)	Madz Gampong^ (NU)	Ish Polvoroza^ (Ateneo)	Lester Sawal (UST)	
2016	Reinforced	**Howard Mojica** (2) (Air Force)	Lorenzo Capate (Cignal)	Kheeno Franco (IEM)	Peter Torres (3) (Cignal)	Jan Berlin Paglinawan (Champion)	Jessie Lopez (3) (Air Force)	Sandy Montero^ (2) (Cignal)	
2017	Reinforced	Mark Gil Alfafara (3) (Cignal)	Fauzi Ismail (2) (Air Force)	Jayvee Sumagaysay^ (Army)	Greg Dolor^ (2) (IEM)	Edward Camposano^ (Sta. Elena)	Vince Mangulabnan (Cignal)	Rence Melgar (IEM)	
2017	Open	Edwin Tolentino (Air Force)	Isaah Arda (Sta. Elena)	Kim Malabunga^ (3) (Megabuilders)	Francis Saura^ (Megabuilders)	Jan Berlin Paglinawan (2) (Sta. Elena)	Vince Mangulabnan (2) (Cignal)	Sandy Montero^ (3) (Cignal)	
2017	Collegiate	**Marck Espejo** (4) (Ateneo)	Fauzi Ismail (3) (NU)	John Paul Bugaoan^ (FEU)	Kim Malabunga^ (4) (NU)	Joshua Umandal^ (UST)	Ish Polvoroza^ (2) (Ateneo)	Manuel Sumanguid III^ (Ateneo)	
2018	Reinforced	**Marck Espejo** (5) (Cignal)	Fauzi Ismail (4) (Air Force)	Rex Intal^ (Cignal)	John Paul Bugaoan^ (2) (Vice Co.)	John Vic De Guzman (PLDT)	Ronchette Villegas (PLDT)	Rence Melgar (2) (PLDT)	
2018	Collegiate	Bryan Bagunas (NU)	**Paolo Pablico** (Adamson)	John Paul Bugaoan^ (3) (FEU)	Jayvee Sumagaysay^ (2) (UST)	Joshua Umandal^ (2) (UST)	Timothy Tajanlangit (UST)	Ricky Marcos (2) (NU)	
2018	Open	Ranran Abdilla (Air Force)	**Bryan Bagunas** (2) (Sta. Elena–NU)	Peter Torres (4) (Cignal)	Jayvee Sumagaysay^ (3) (PLDT)	Ysay Marasigan^ (2) (Cignal)	Ronchette Villegas (2) (PLDT)	Ricky Marcos (3) (Sta. Elena–NU)	
2019	Reinforced	**Ranran Abdilla** (2) (Air Force)	Marck Espejo (6) (Cignal)	Berhashidin Daymil (Sta. Elena–NU)	Kim Malabunga^ (5) (Air Force)	John Vic De Guzman (2) (PLDT)	Vince Mangulabnan (3) (Cignal)	Manuel Sumanguid III^ (2) (Cignal)	
2019	Open	**Ranran Abdilla** (3) (Air Force)	Marck Espejo (7) (Cignal)	Francis Saura^ (2) (Air Force)	Anjo Pertierra (Cignal)	**Ysay Marasigan**^ (3) (Cignal)	Owa Retamar^ (Sta. Elena–NU)	Ricky Marcos (4) (Sta. Elena–NU)	
2022	Open	Marck Espejo (8) (Cignal)	John San Andres^ (VNS)	Obed Mukaba (NU–Sta. Elena)	John Paul Bugaoan^ (4) (Cignal)	Ysay Marasigan^ (4) (Cignal)	Owa Retamar^ (2) (NU–Sta. Elena)	Manuel Sumanguid III^ (3) (Cignal)	
2023	Open	Jade Disquitado (Iloilo)	Wendel Miguel^ (Cignal)	John Paul Bugaoan^ (5) (Cignal)	Mfena Gwaza^ (Iloilo)	Ysay Marasigan^ (5) (Cignal)	Michael Apolonario^ (Iloilo)	Manuel Sumanguid III^ (4) (Cignal)	
2023	Invitational	Joshua Umandal^ (3) (Cignal)	John Bautista (Saints and Lattes–Letran)	John Paul Bugaoan^ (6) (Cignal)	Vince Himzon^ (Saints and Lattes–Letran)	Leo Ordiales (Sta. Elena–NU)	Owa Retamar^ (3) (Sta. Elena–NU)	Manuel Sumanguid III^ (5) (Cignal)	

=== From 2024 ===
Starting from the 2024–25 season, the two Best Outside Hitters and two Best Middle Blockers were no longer ranked.

Season	Conference	Best Outside Hitters		Best Middle Blockers		Best Opposite Hitter	Best Setter	Best Libero	Ref.
2024–25	2024 Open	Greg Dolor^ (3) (PGJC–Navy)	Joshua Umandal^ (4) (Cignal)	Peter Quiel^ (PGJC–Navy)	Abdurasad Nursiddik^ (Iloilo)	Francis Saura^ (3) (Iloilo)	Kris Silang^ (Cignal)	Jack Kalingking^ (PGJC–Navy)	
2024–25	Invitational	Nico Almendras^ (Criss Cross)	Sherwin Caritativo^ (Savouge)	Gian Glorioso^ (Criss Cross)	Giles Torres^ (Savouge)	Zhydryx Saavedra^ (DN Steel–FEU)	Ish Polvoroza^ (3) (Criss Cross)	Vince Lorenzo^ (Cignal)	
2024–25	2025 Open	Mark Calado^ (Savouge)	Sherwin Caritativo^ (2) (Savouge)	John Paul Bugaoan^ (7) (Cignal)	Gian Glorioso^ (2) (Criss Cross)	Steve Rotter (Cignal)	Ish Polvoroza^ (4) (Criss Cross)	Vince Lorenzo^ (2) (Cignal)	
2025–26	Invitational	**Jude Garcia**^ (Criss Cross)	Joshua Umandal^ (5) (Cignal)	Edlyn Colinares^ (Criss Cross)	Giles Torres^ (2) (Savouge)	Ryutaro Aun^ (Kindai)	Adrian Villados^ (Criss Cross)	Yuito Kose^ (Kindai)	
2025–26	Open	Sherwin Caritativo^ (3) (Savouge)	Alche Gupiteo^ (Criss Cross)	John Paul Bugaoan^ (8) (Savouge)	Lloyd Josafat^ (Criss Cross)	**Jude Garcia**^ (2) (Criss Cross)	Adrian Villados^ (2) (Criss Cross)	Vince Lorenzo^ (3) (AEP)	

=== Most selections ===
The following table only lists players with at least five total selections.

Player	Pos.	Total
(Philippines) Marck Espejo	OH	8
(Philippines) John Paul Bugaoan	MB	8
(Philippines) Kim Malabunga	MB	5
(Philippines) Ysay Marasigan	OPP	5
(Philippines) Manuel Sumanguid III	L	5
(Philippines) Joshua Umandal	OH/OPP	5

== See also ==
- All-Premier Team
