= 2026 Volleyball All-Star Showcase =

Philippine volleyball exhibition matches

Tournament information
- Sport: Volleyball
- Location: Candon, Ilocos Sur
- Date: May 1, 2026
- Administrator: Sports Vision
- Tournament format: All-star game
- Venue: Candon City Arena
- Participants: Spikers' Turf and Premier Volleyball League players

Final positions
- Champions: Team Power (M); Team Heart (W)
- MVP: Noel Kampton (M); Bella Belen (W)

The 2026 Volleyball All-Star Showcase was the fourth edition of the all-star exhibition event organized by Sports Vision and the inaugural Volleyball All-Star Showcase. The event was held on May 1, 2026, at Candon City Arena in Candon, Ilocos Sur. The matches featured select players of the men's Spikers' Turf and the women's Premier Volleyball League. This marked the return of the format since the organization of the PVL All-Star Game in 2019. This was the first all-star game for the PVL since it became a professional league.

== Background ==
=== Rosters formation ===
The 2026 Volleyball All-Star Showcase featured two teams each from the men's Spikers' Turf and the women's Premier Volleyball League. Each team had 14 players. Seven players (two outside hitters, one opposite hitter, two middle blockers, one setter, and one libero) were selected by the fans through online voting from March 15 to April 11, 2026. Each team has a locked pool of players, where voters can select the seven players from within that assigned group. The starters were confirmed on April 13, 2026. The reserves were announced on April 20, 2026. On April 25, 2026, Criss Cross' Malabunga, Marasigan and AEP Cabstars' Schnake have been officially named replacements after late adjustments to the original lineups for the event, which brings together the Spikers Turf's top stars.

The starting lineup was determined by fans and coaches, who are not allowed to vote for their own players. The remaining seven players, selected by the coaches, players, team officials, and other stakeholders such as members of the media were designated as reserves.

The head coaches were drawn from the top two teams of the preliminary rounds of the 2026 PVL All-Filipino Conference and 2026 Spikers' Turf Open Conference. The coaches shall appoint their own assistant coaches. The coaches of the four teams were confirmed on April 9, 2026.

=== Game format ===
The following rules were laid for the exhibition games:

- All 14 players in the four teams must have playing minutes during the two games.
- First set: fan voted starters must remain in the court until the 16th point of the set was scored
- Second set: Reserves should start, substitutions are allowed after the 8th point
- Third set: Starter remain in the court until the 8th point of the set, after which coaches should substitute players to give the remaining players in the roster a chance to play.
- Fourth set: Two liberos can be fielded in at the same time, and are allowed to block and attack.
- Once per set, each team can call for a "Premier Ball" via a signal by the captain. A team that wins the rally win 2 points instead of one. Its cannot be used to close out a set. Its use is capped at 22 points in sets one to four and 12 points in the fifth set.

Side events such as the Setter Challenge, Digging Challenge, and Serving Challenge were held. Participants of which was drawn from the four teams.

=== Prize money ===
The winning teams were awarded ₱100,000 each with the losing teams still given ₱50,000 each.

== Venue ==
Candon, Ilocos Sur
Candon City Arena
Capacity: 8,000
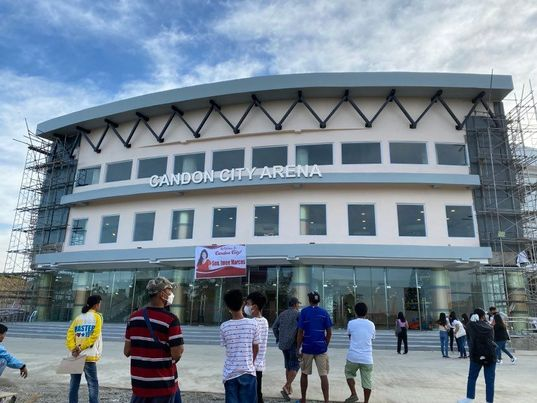

== Team rosters ==
=== Premier Volleyball League ===
==== Team Heart ====
Head coach: Rald Ricafort (PLDT)

Team Heart
Position	Name	Club
S	Jia de Guzman	Creamline Cool Smashers
L	Justine Jazareno	Akari Chargers
MB	Jeanette Panaga	Creamline Cool Smashers
MB	Majoy Baron	PLDT High Speed Hitters
OH	Jema Galanza	Creamline Cool Smashers
OH	Bella Belen	Capital1 Solar Spikers
OP	Erika Santos	Cignal Super Spikers^{LOA}
S	Gel Cayuna*	Cignal Super Spikers^{LOA}
L	Dawn Macandili-Catindig*	Cignal Super Spikers^{LOA}
MB	MJ Phillips*	Nxled Chameleons
MB	Jean Asis*	Galeries Tower Highrisers
OH	Alyssa Valdez*	Creamline Cool Smashers
OH	Vanie Gandler*	Cignal Super Spikers^{LOA}
OP	Myla Pablo*	Nxled Chameleons

- (*) Reserve player
- ^LOA Ahead of the event, the Cignal Super Spikers women's team took a leave of absence from the PVL.

==== Team Hustle ====
Head coach: Shaq Delos Santos (Cignal)

Team Hustle
Position	Name	Club
S	Kim Fajardo	PLDT High Speed Hitters
L	Kath Arado	PLDT High Speed Hitters
MB	Mika Reyes	PLDT High Speed Hitters
MB	Fifi Sharma	Akari Chargers
OH	Bernadeth Pons	Creamline Cool Smashers
OH	Eya Laure	Choco Mucho Flying Titans
OP	Kim Kianna Dy	PLDT High Speed Hitters
S	Alohi Robins-Hardy*	Farm Fresh Foxies
L	Alyssa Eroa*	Zus Coffee Thunderbelles
MB	Bea De Leon*	Creamline Cool Smashers
MB	Jackie Acuña*	Cignal Super Spikers^{LOA}
OH	Brooke Van Sickle*	Nxled Chameleons
OH	Ivy Lacsina*	Akari Chargers
OP	Tots Carlos*	Creamline Cool Smashers

- (*) Reserve player
- ^LOA Ahead of the event, the Cignal Super Spikers women's team took a leave of absence from the PVL.

=== Spikers' Turf ===
==== Team Passion (PAS) ====
Head coach: Tai Bundit (Criss Cross)

Team Passion
Position	Name	Club
S	Vince Imperial	Savouge Spin Doctors
L	Rikko Marmeto	Savouge Spin Doctors
MB	Giles Torres	Savouge Spin Doctors
MB	Poy Colinares	Criss Cross King Crunchers
OH	Alche Gupiteo	Criss Cross King Crunchers
OH	Jau Umandal	Alpha Insurance Protectors
OP	Mark Calado	Savouge Spin Doctors
S	Kris Cian Silang*	Alpha Insurance Protectors
L	John Philip Pepito*	Criss Cross King Crunchers
MB	Gian Glorioso*	Criss Cross King Crunchers
MB	Mfena Gwaza*	AEP Cabstars
OH	Sherwin Caritativo* ^{WD1}	Savouge Spin Doctors
OH	Jared Schnake* ^{REP1}	AEP Cabstars
OH	Nico Almendras*	Criss Cross King Crunchers
OP	Jay Rack de la Noche*	AEP Cabstars

- (*) Reserve player
- ^WD1 Sherwin Caritativo withdrew due to personal reasons.
- ^REP1 Jared Schnake played in place of Sherwin Caritativo.

==== Team Power (PWR) ====
Head coach: Sydney Calderon (Savouge)

Team Power
Position	Name	Club
S	Adrian Villados	Criss Cross King Crunchers
L	Menard Guerrero	Criss Cross King Crunchers
MB	Lloyd Josafat	Criss Cross King Crunchers
MB	JP Bugaoan^{WD2}	Savouge Spin Doctors
MB	Kim Malabunga^{ST1}	Criss Cross King Crunchers
OH	Noel Kampton	Criss Cross King Crunchers
OH	Louie Ramirez	Savouge Spin Doctors
OP	Jude Garcia	Criss Cross King Crunchers
S	EJ Casana*	AEP Cabstars
L	Vince Lorenzo*	AEP Cabstars
MB	Jayvee Sumagaysay*	VNS Griffins
MB	Billie Anima*	Alpha Insurance Protectors
OH	Edward Camposano* ^{WD3}	Alpha Insurance Protectors
OH	Ysay Marasigan* ^{REP2}	Criss Cross King Crunchers
OH	JM Ronquillo*	Alpha Insurance Protectors
OP	Jaron Requinton*	Criss Cross King Crunchers

- (*) Reserve player
- ^WD2 JP Bugaoan withdrew due to personal reasons.
- ^ST1 Kim Malabunga started in place of JP Bugaoan.
- ^WD3 Edward Camposano withdrew due to personal reasons.
- ^REP2 Ysay Marasigan played in place of Edward Camposano.

== Side events ==
All-Star side events
Side event	Participants		Winners	Ref
Side event	Team 1	Team 2	Winners	Ref
Zig-Zag Dig-a-Thon Challenge	Team Heart: Jema Galanza; Myla Pablo; Jean Asis	Team Hustle: Jackie Acuña; Tots Carlos; Brooke Van Sickle	Team Hustle	
Infinite Volley Extravaganza	Team Power: Noel Kampton; Jayvee Sumagaysay; Ysay Marasigan	Team Passion: Jau Umandal; Jared Schnake; Mfena Gwaza	Team Power	
Crosscourt Sniper Challenge	Team Yellow: Dawn Catindig; Justine Jazareno; Menard Guerrero; Vince Lorenzo	Team Blue: Alyssa Eroa; Kath Arado; John Philip Pepito; Rikko Marmeto	Team Blue	

== All-Star Games ==
Spikers' Turf (men)

May 1, 2026; 15:00 (UTC+8:00)	Team Power	3–1	Team Passion	Candon City Arena, Candon; Attendance: 3,743; Referees: Jeff Lopez (PHI), Erlindo Eusebio (PHI)
May 1, 2026; 15:00 (UTC+8:00)	(25–18, 25–18, 21–25, 25–23)			Candon City Arena, Candon; Attendance: 3,743; Referees: Jeff Lopez (PHI), Erlindo Eusebio (PHI)
May 1, 2026; 15:00 (UTC+8:00)	Scoring leaders			Candon City Arena, Candon; Attendance: 3,743; Referees: Jeff Lopez (PHI), Erlindo Eusebio (PHI)
Kampton (14/36)		Total	Calado (16/34)
Kampton (13/22)		Attack	Calado (14/23)
Josafat (3/10)		Block	Colinares (2/14)
Josafat (1/13)		Serve

- Most Valuable Player: Noel Kampton

Premier Volleyball League (women)

May 1, 2026; 17:30 (UTC+8:00)	Team Heart	3–1	Team Hustle	Candon City Arena, Candon; Attendance: 4,637; Referees: Roberto Celso (PHI), Fernando Velarde (PHI)
May 1, 2026; 17:30 (UTC+8:00)	(25–18, 18-25, 25–23 25-17)			Candon City Arena, Candon; Attendance: 4,637; Referees: Roberto Celso (PHI), Fernando Velarde (PHI)
May 1, 2026; 17:30 (UTC+8:00)	Scoring leaders			Candon City Arena, Candon; Attendance: 4,637; Referees: Roberto Celso (PHI), Fernando Velarde (PHI)
Belen (15/45)		Total	Van Sickle (11/39)
Belen (13/29)		Attack	Van Sickle (10/30)
Asis (5/15)		Block	4 players, 1 each
Santos (2/8)		Serve	Robins-Hardy (1/15)

- Most Valuable Player: Bella Belen
