= List of Spikers' Turf teams =

This is a list of volleyball teams that played in the Spikers' Turf.

== A ==
- AFP Cav Spikers
- Alpha Insurance Protectors
- Alpha Omega Elite Spikers
- Adamson University
  - Davies Paint-Adamson Soaring Falcons
- AMC Cotabato Spikers
- Animo Green Blazing Spikers
- Arellano University
- Ateneo de Manila University
  - Ateneo-Fudgee Barr Blue Eagles

== C ==
- Cagayan Valley Rising Suns
- Cabstars-Cabuyao
  - AEP Cabstars
- CEU Scorpions
- Chichi DHTSI Braderhood Titans
  - 3B Event Masters
  - RichMarc Sports 3B Elite Spikers
- Cignal Super Spikers
- Clearskiiin UV Smashers
- Colegio de San Juan de Letran
  - Saints and Lattes-Letran Saints Spikers
- College of Saint Benilde
  - St. Gerrard Construction-Benilde Blazing Builders
- Criss Cross King Crunchers

== D ==
- D' Navigators Iloilo
- De La Salle University - Dasmariñas
  - Don Pacundo-DLSU Dasmarinas Patriots
- De La Salle University - Manila
  - EcoOil-La Salle Green Oilers

== E ==
- Emilio Aguinaldo College
  - EAC-Xentromall Generals
- Easy Trip-Raimol

== F ==
- Far Eastern University
  - Chef on a Diet-FEU Tamaraws
  - DN Steel–FEU Ultras
  - Hachiran-FEU Tamaraws
  - Prima-FEU Tamaraws
- Fourbees Cavite Patriots Total Attackers

== I ==
- Imus City–AJAA Spikers
- IEM Volley Masters

== L ==
- Lyceum of the Philippines University
  - The Bayleaf Hotels-Lyceum Pirates

== M ==
- Mapúa University
- Martelli Meats Master Butchers
  - Maverick Hard Hitters

== K ==
- Kindai University (Japan) (Guest Team)
- KondohGumi Hyogo (Japan) (Guest Team)
  - Maruichi Hyogo

== N ==
- National College of Business and Arts
- National University
  - NU-Archipelago Builders

== P ==
- Philippine Air Force Airmen
  - Philippine Air Force Agilas
  - Philippine Air Force Air Spikers
  - Philippine Air Force Jet Spikers
  - Go for Gold-Air Force Aguilas
  - Philippine Air Force Airmen
- PCU Dasmariñas-SASKIN Dolphins
- Philippine Army Troopers
  - Army-Katinko Troopers
- Philippine Coast Guard Lifesavers
  - Philippine Coast Guard Dolphins
- Philippine Merchant Marine School
- Rebisco-Philippines
- PGJC-Navy Sea Lions
  - Philippine Navy Sailors
  - Philippine Navy Fighting Stingrays
- PLDT Home Fibr Power Hitters
  - PLDT Home Ultera Ultra Fast Hitters
- ProVolley Academy (Australia) (Guest Team)

== R ==
- Rizal Technological University
  - RTU Blue Thunders

== S ==
- Santa Rosa City Lions
- Savouge Spin Doctors
  - Savouge RTU-Basilan Golden Thunders
- Sta. Elena Ball Hammers
  - Champion Infinity Active Smashers
  - Champion Supra Smashers
  - Sta. Elena Construction Wrecking Balls
  - Sta. Elena–NU Nationals
- San Beda University
  - MKA-San Beda Red Spikers
- San Sebastian College – Recoletos
- Surabaya BIN Samator (Indonesia) (Guest Team)

== U ==
- University of the East
- University of Perpetual Help System DALTA
  - Perpetual-Kinto Altas
- University of the Philippines - Diliman
- University of Santo Tomas
  - University of Santo Tomas–Gameville

== V ==
- Vanguard Volley Hitters
- Volleyball Never Stops
  - Bounty Fresh Soaring Griffins
  - 100 Plus Active Spikers
  - Fury Blazing Hitters
  - VNS Griffins
  - VNS-One Alicia Griffins
  - VNS-Nasty Griffins
  - VNS-Laticrete Griffins

== See also ==
- Premier Volleyball League
- Shakey's V-League
