= List of Spikers' Turf conference results =

Spikers' Turf hosts a number conferences each season. The following is the results of each conference, showing where each team ranked in that conference. From 2017 to early 2018, it merged with the Premier Volleyball League before it was split back into its own league from the 2018 Open Conference onwards.

== Results by conference ==
Season	Conference	Champion	Runner-up	3rd	4th	5th	6th	7th	8th	9th	10th	11th	12th	Ref.
2015	Open	PLDT	Cagayan Valley	Air Force	Cignal	Army	Systema	Fourbees	IEM	—N/a				
2015	Collegiate	Ateneo	NU	EAC	NCBA	La Salle	UP	Benilde	FEU	Mapúa	Arellano	DLSU-D	UE	
2015	Reinforced	Cignal	Air Force	PLDT	Navy	IEM	Sta. Elena	—N/a						
2016	Open	Air Force	Cignal	Sta. Elena	IEM	Bounty	Navy	—N/a						
2016	Collegiate	Ateneo	NU	UST	La Salle	FEU	UP	Perpetual	NCBA	Benilde	San Beda	EAC	PMMS	
2016	Reinforced	Air Force	Cignal	Champion	IEM	Army	100 Plus	—N/a						
2017	Reinforced	Cignal	Air Force	Army	Sta. Elena	IEM	Cafe Lupe	—N/a						
2017	Open	Cignal	Megabuilders	Air Force	Sta. Elena	Army	IEM	Gamboa	Cafe Lupe	—N/a				
2017	Collegiate	Ateneo	FEU	UST	NU	San Beda	La Salle	UP	Benilde	—N/a				
2018	Reinforced	Air Force	Cignal	Vice Co.	PLDT	Army	IEM	—N/a						
2018	Collegiate	NU	UST	FEU	Adamson	Benilde	UP	Perpetual	La Salle	San Beda	Arellano			
2018	Open	Air Force	PLDT	Cignal	FEU	Ateneo	Navy	IEM	Army	Fury	Sta.Elena	—N/a		
2019	Reinforced	Cignal	Air Force	PLDT	Sta.Elena	Army	Navy	Animo	IEM	VNS Griffins	Easy Trip-Raimol	Coast Guard	—N/a	
2019	Open	Cignal	Air Force	Sta. Elena	Perpetual	Navy	PLDT	IEM	Ateneo	La Salle	FEU	VNS Griffins	Easy Trip-Raimol	
2019	Open	Adamson (13th)	UST (14th)	Arellano (15th)	Mapúa (16th)	Army (17th)	EAC (18th)	Lyceum (19th)	SSC-R (20th)	Coast Guard (21st)	San Beda (22nd)	NCBA (23rd)	CEU (24th)	
2022	Open	NU-Sta. Elena	Cignal	PGJC-Navy	VNS-One Alicia	Santa Rosa City	Ateneo-Fudgee Barr	Army-Katinko	—N/a					
2023	Open	Cignal	AMC Cotabato	Imus City–AJAA	D' Navigators	VNS	PGJC-Navy	Santa Rosa City	Army	NU-Archipelago	Air Force	Vanguard	—N/a	
2023	Invitational	Sta. Elena-NU	Cignal	Maruichi	Saints and Lattes-Letran	Perpetual-Kinto	Chef-FEU	Cabstars	PGJC-Navy	EcoOil-La Salle	VNS	Army	Davies Paint-Adamson	
2023	Invitational	Savouge-RTU (13th)	D' Navigators (14th)	EAC-Xentromall (15th)	MKA-San Beda (16th)	SGC-Benilde (17th)	Air Force (18th)	Ateneo-Fudgee Barr (19th)	Alpha Omega (20th)	Santa Rosa City (21st)	Don Pacundo-DLSU (22nd)	PCU-Saskin (23rd)	TBH-Lyceum (24th)	
2023	Invitational	Coast Guard (25th)	—N/a											
2024–25	2024 Open	Cignal	Criss Cross	PGJC-Navy	D' Navigators	Savouge	VNS–Nasty	Maverick	Air Force	RichMarc Sports 3B	—N/a			
2024–25	Invitational	Cignal	Criss Cross	Savouge	DN Steel-FEU	KondohGumi	EcoOil-La Salle	PGJC-Navy	VNS	D' Navigators	Martelli Meats	Chichi DHTSI	—N/a	
2024–25	2025 Open	Cignal	Criss Cross	Savouge	VNS	Alpha Insurance	PGJC-Navy	—N/a						
2025–26	Invitational	Criss Cross	Kindai University	Cignal	Savouge	UST–Gameville	ProVolley Academy	Alpha Insurance	FEU–DN Steel	VNS	PGJC-Navy	—N/a		
2025–26	Open	Criss Cross	Savouge	AEP Cabstars	Alpha Insurance	3B Event Masters	VNS	—N/a						

== Results by team ==
=== Key ===
Key
C	Conference champion	#	Reached semifinals in conference
2	Conference runner-up	#	Reached quarterfinals in conference
3	Placed third in conference	#	Participated in conference
4	Placed fourth in conference		Did not participate in conference
Number (#) indicates ranking in the conference

=== Commercial teams ===
Team	2015		2016		2017		2018		2019		2022	2023		2024–25			2025–26	
Team	O	R	O	R	R	O	R	O	R	O	O	O	I	'24 O	I	'25 O	I	O
Active teams
3B														9	11			5
AEP													7					3
Alpha Insurance																5	7	4
Criss Cross														2	2	2	C	C
Savouge														5	3	3	4	2
VNS			5	6	6	8		9	9	11	4	5	10	6	8	4	9	6
Former teams
Alpha Omega Elite													20					
AMC Cotabato Spikers												2						
Cagayan Valley Rising Suns	2																	
Cignal	4	C	2	2	C	C	2	3	C	C	2	C	2	C	C	C	3	
D'Navigators Iloilo												4	14	4	9			
Easy Trip–Raimol									10	12								
Fourbees	7																	
Gamboa Coffee						7												
Imus City–AJAA Spikers												3						
Instituto Estetico Manila	8	5	4	4	5	6	6	7	8	7								
Martelli Meats														7	10			
Megabuilders						2												
Philippine Air Force	3	2	C	C	2	3	C	C	2	2		9	18	8				
Philippine Army	5			5	3	5	5	8	5	17	7	8	11					
Philippine Coast Guard									11	21			25					
Philippine Navy		4	6					6	6	5	3	6	8	3	7	6	10	
PLDT	C	3					4	2	3	6								
Santa Rosa City Lions											5	7	21					
Sta. Elena	6	6	3	3	4	4		10	4	3	C		C					
Vanguard												11						
Vice Co.							3					11						

=== Collegiate ===
Team	2015	2016	2017	2018
Adamson				4
Arellano	10			10
Ateneo	C	C	C	
Benilde	7	9	8	5
De La Salle	5	4	6	8
DLSU–D	11			
EAC	3	11		
FEU	8	5	2	3
Mapúa	9			
NCBA	4	8		
NU	2	2	4	C
Perpetual		7		7
PMMS		12		
San Beda		10	5	9
UE	12			
UP	6	6	7	6
UST		3	3	2

== See also ==
- List of Premier Volleyball League conference results
- List of Shakey's V-League conference results
- List of V-League (Philippines) conference results
