= 2026 Spikers' Turf Invitational Conference =

First Conference of the 2026 SPT season

- Duration: October 10, 2026 – present
- Teams: 12
- Matches: 38
- Attendance: 14,419 (379 per match)
- TV partner(s): One Sports; One Sports+
- Streaming partner(s): Cignal Play; One Sports YouTube channel

Spikers' Turf Invitational Conference chronology
- < 2025 2027 >

Spikers' Turf conference chronology
- < 2026 Open 2027 Open >

The 2026 Spikers' Turf Invitational Conference will be the first conference of the 2026–27 season of Spikers' Turf. The tournament began on October 10, 2026. Two foreign guest teams receive a bye to the semifinals.

== Participating teams ==
This tournament saw two new teams enter the league, with the first being the Clearskiiin UV Smashers, announced on September 11 as the sister team to the Savouge Spin Doctors. The Armed Forces of the Philippines made their return with a new unified team, the AFP Cav Spikers.

The eight member teams are joined by the top two teams in the 2026 V-League Collegiate Challenge, which were later determined to be the FEU-DN Steel Tamraws and NU-Archipelago Builders Bulldogs.

Two foreign guest teams enter the semifinals: ProVolley Academy of Australia and Surabaya BIN Samator of Indonesia.

2025 Spikers' Turf Invitational Conference
Abbr.	Team	Affiliation	Head coach	Team captain
Local regular teams
AFP	AFP Cav Spikers	Armed Forces of the Philippines	(Philippines) Benjaylo Labide	Jessie Lopez
TEM	3B Event Masters	3B Production & Entertainment	(Philippines) Arjay Francisco	Bonjomar Castel
ALP	Alpha Insurance Protectors	Alpha Insurance & Surety Company Inc.	(Philippines) Mike Santos	Jefferson Abuniawan
CAB	AEP Cabstars	Cabstars Men's Volleyball Team / Cabuyao	(Philippines) Kitty Antiporta	Miguel Andrew Dasig
CUV	Clearskiiin UV Smashers	ClearSkiiin Philippines	(United States) Joe Bangit	Louis Gamban; JM Ronquillo
CKC	Criss Cross King Crunchers	Republic Biscuit Corporation	(Thailand) Tai Bundit	Ysay Marasigan
SVG	Savouge Spin Doctors	Savouge Aesthetics Philippines	(Philippines) Sydney Calderon	Hero Austria
VNS	VNS Laticrete Griffins	VNS Management Group	(Philippines) Ralph Raymund Ocampo	John Joshua Cruz
2026 V-League Collegiate Challenge qualifying teams
NUI	NU- Archipelago Builders Bulldogs	National University / Archipelago Builders Corporation	(Philippines) Dante Alinsunurin	Rwenzmel Taguibolos
FEU	FEU-DN Steel Tamaraws	Far Eastern University / DN Steel Group of Companies	(Philippines) Eddieson Orcullo	Zhydryx Saavedra
Foreign guest teams
PVA	ProVolley Academy (Australia)		To be determined	To be determined
SBS	Surabaya BIN Samator (Indonesia)		To be determined	To be determined

== Format ==
This Invitational Conference will retain the format first used in 2024. The league's member teams will be joined by the top two teams from the men's tournament of the 2026 V-League Collegiate Challenge. Including the two guest teams that will join later, a total of 12 teams will compete in this tournament.

Preliminary round

The ten local teams will compete in a single round-robin tournament, each playing nine matches, one against each team. The top four teams will advance to the semifinals. The six teams that fail to advance to be ranked 7th through 12th.

Semifinals

The top four teams from the preliminary round will join the two guest teams in the semifinals. This round is another single round-robin, with each team playing five matches. The top two teams will advance to the finals, the third and fourth place teams will compete in the third place match, while the fifth and sixth place teams will be eliminated and ranked accordingly.

Third place match

The losing teams from the semifinals compete in a single match to determine which team will finish third.

Finals

The winning teams from the semifinals compete in a single match to determine the conference champions. The losing team in this round will be declared conference runners-up.

== Pool standing procedure ==
Teams are initially ranked by wins followed by match points. A win awards three points if the match lasted for three or four sets (3–0 or 3–1), or two points if the match lasted for five sets (3–2). A loss only awards one point if the match lasted for five sets (2–3).

If multiple teams tie for wins and match points, the next criteria are set ratio (the number of sets won divided by number of sets lost across all matches) and point ratio (the number of points won divided by number of points lost across all matches). If any teams remain tied, the procedure will be applied again, but only considering matches between the remaining tied teams.

== Preliminary round ==
=== Ranking ===
Pos	Team	Pld	W	L	Pts	SW	SL	SR	SPW	SPL	SPR	Qualification
1	Criss Cross King Crunchers	9	9	0	24	27	9	3.000	840	693	1.212	Final round
2	Savouge Spin Doctors	9	7	2	23	25	9	2.778	819	696	1.177	Final round
3	NU-Archipelago Builders Bulldogs	9	7	2	21	22	9	2.444	731	605	1.208	Final round
4	FEU-DN Steel Tamaraws	9	6	3	19	21	12	1.750	770	704	1.094	Final round
5	Alpha Insurance Protectors	9	6	3	17	20	12	1.667	746	695	1.073	
6	Clearskiiin UV Smashers	9	4	5	10	16	21	0.762	804	826	0.973	
7	AEP Cabstars	9	3	6	8	11	21	0.524	677	738	0.917	
8	VNS Laticrete Griffins	9	2	7	8	13	22	0.591	722	817	0.884	
9	3B Event Masters	9	1	8	4	7	25	0.280	618	755	0.819	
10	AFP Cav Spikers	9	0	9	1	5	27	0.185	601	789	0.762	

Source: Spikers' Turf – Standings

=== Match results ===
- All times are Philippine Standard Time (UTC+08:00).

Date	Time	Venue		Score		Set 1	Set 2	Set 3	Set 4	Set 5	Total	Report
Oct. 10	3:30 pm	SCA	Alpha Insurance Protectors	3–2	Savouge Spin Doctors	25–22	19–25	26–24	22–25	16–14	108–110	P2
Oct. 13	3:30 pm	SAC	Criss Cross King Crunchers	3–0	AFP Cav Spikers	25–15	25–14	25–12			75–41	P2
Oct. 15	3:30 pm	YCA	3B Event Masters	1–3	Clearskiiin UV Smashers	25–21	15–25	22–25	16–25		78–96	P2
Oct. 17	3:30 pm	FIL	AEP Cabstars	0–3	FEU-DN Steel Tamaraws	23–25	17–25	17–25			57–75	P2
Oct. 20	3:30 pm	MOA	NU-Archipelago Builders Bulldogs	3–1	VNS Laticrete Griffins	25–14	25–13	20–25	25–12		95–64	P2
Oct. 21	11:00 am	FIL	AFP Cav Spikers	1–3	3B Event Masters	18–25	12–25	25–23	21–25		76–98	P2
Oct. 21	1:00 pm	FIL	Clearskiiin UV Smashers	3–1	AEP Cabstars	25–18	19–25	25–23	25–23		94–89	P2
Oct. 21	3:00 pm	FIL	FEU-DN Steel Tamaraws	3–1	VNS Laticrete Griffins	25–23	25–18	23–25	25–22		98–88	P2
Oct. 21	5:00 pm	FIL	Savouge Spin Doctors	2–3	Criss Cross King Crunchers	25–22	25–18	16–25	22–25	14–16	102–106	P2
Oct. 22	3:30 pm	MOA	NU-Archipelago Builders Bulldogs	3–0	Alpha Insurance Protectors	25–20	25–20	25–23			75–63	P2
Oct. 24	3:30 pm	FIL	VNS Laticrete Griffins	2–3	Clearskiiin UV Smashers	33–31	25–21	18–25	20–25	9–15	105–117	P2
Oct. 25	11:00 am	FIL	AEP Cabstars	3–1	AFP Cav Spikers	26–28	25–20	25–17	25–18		101–83	P2
Oct. 25	1:00 pm	FIL	Savouge Spin Doctors	3–0	3B Event Masters	25–18	25–22	25–20			75–60	P2
Oct. 25	3:00 pm	FIL	FEU-DN Steel Tamaraws	1–3	NU-Archipelago Builders Bulldogs	15–25	21–25	26–24	21–25		83–99	P2
Oct. 25	5:00 pm	FIL	Criss Cross King Crunchers	3–1	Alpha Insurance Protectors	25–22	21–25	25–21	25–19		96–87	P2
Oct. 27	3:30 pm	NAS	AFP Cav Spikers	0–3	VNS Laticrete Griffins	28–30	20–25	21–25			69–80	P2
Nov. 3	3:30 pm	SAC	Clearskiiin UV Smashers	3–2	AFP Cav Spikers	25–12	25–14	24–26	14–25	15–9	103–86	P2
Nov. 4	11:00 am	FIL	3B Event Masters	1–3	VNS Laticrete Griffins	24–26	13–25	27–25	17–25		81–101	P2
Nov. 4	1:00 pm	FIL	Criss Cross King Crunchers	3–1	NU-Archipelago Builders Bulldogs	23–25	25–16	25–20	25–20		98–81	P2
Nov. 4	3:00 pm	FIL	Alpha Insurance Protectors	3–0	AEP Cabstars	25–19	25–22	25–20			75–61	P2
Nov. 4	5:00 pm	FIL	Savouge Spin Doctors	3–0	FEU-DN Steel Tamaraws	25–23	25–18	25–19			75–60	P2
Nov. 5	3:30 pm	PSA	AFP Cav Spikers	0–3	Alpha Insurance Protectors	19–25	21–25	15–25			55–75	P2
Nov. 7	3:30 pm	PSA	NU-Archipelago Builders Bulldogs	3–0	AFP Cav Spikers	25–14	25–16	25–19			75–49	P2
Nov. 8	11:00 am	FIL	AEP Cabstars	0–3	Criss Cross King Crunchers	15–25	12–25	20–25			47–75	P2
Nov. 8	1:00 pm	FIL	FEU-DN Steel Tamaraws	3–1	Clearskiiin UV Smashers	27–29	25–19	25–22	25–21		102–91	P2
Nov. 8	3:00 pm	FIL	Alpha Insurance Protectors	3–0	3B Event Masters	25–16	25–20	25–22			75–58	P2
Nov. 8	5:00 pm	FIL	VNS Laticrete Griffins	1–3	Savouge Spin Doctors	10–25	13–25	25–20	19–25		67–95	P2
Nov. 10	3:30 pm	SAC	AFP Cav Spikers	1–3	Savouge Spin Doctors	22–25	17–25	34–32	23–25		96–107	P2
Nov. 11	11:00 am	FIL	VNS Laticrete Griffins	0–3	Alpha Insurance Protectors	22–25	16–25	14–25			52–75	P2
Nov. 11	1:00 pm	FIL	NU-Archipelago Builders Bulldogs	3–1	AEP Cabstars	25–18	25–15	20–25	25–20		95–78	P2
Nov. 11	3:00 pm	FIL	3B Event Masters	0–3	FEU-DN Steel Tamaraws	15–25	16–25	17–25			48–75	P2
Nov. 11	5:00 pm	FIL	Clearskiiin UV Smashers	1–3	Criss Cross King Crunchers	26–24	19–25	21–25	23–25		89–99	P2
Nov. 12	3:30 pm	SAC	FEU-DN Steel Tamaraws	3–0	AFP Cav Spikers	25–16	25–20	25–10			75–46	P2
Nov. 14	3:30 pm	PSA	VNS Laticrete Griffins	0–3	AEP Cabstars	25–27	19–25	16–25			60–77	P2
Nov. 15	11:00 am	FIL	Savouge Spin Doctors	3–0	NU-Archipelago Builders Bulldogs	25–18	25–23	25–20			75–61	P2
Nov. 15	1:00 pm	FIL	3B Event Masters	2–3	AEP Cabstars	25–18	20–25	22–25	26–24	13–15	106–107	P2
Nov. 15	3:00 pm	FIL	Criss Cross King Crunchers	3–2	VNS Laticrete Griffins	25–19	23–25	22–25	25–23	15–13	110–105	P2
Nov. 15	5:00 pm	FIL	Alpha Insurance Protectors	3–1	Clearskiiin UV Smashers	26–24	18–25	25–19	25–21		94–89	P2
Nov. 17	3:30 pm	PSA	NU-Archipelago Builders Bulldogs	3–0	3B Event Masters	25–16	25–20	25–12			75–48	P2
Nov. 18	11:00 am	FIL	AEP Cabstars	0–3	Savouge Spin Doctors	20–25	23–25	17–25			60–75	P2
Nov. 18	1:00 pm	FIL	3B Event Masters	0–3	Criss Cross King Crunchers	13–25	15–25	13–25			41–75	P2
Nov. 18	3:00 pm	FIL	Alpha Insurance Protectors	1–3	FEU-DN Steel Tamaraws	31–33	18–25	25–19	20–25		94–102	P2
Nov. 18	5:00 pm	FIL	Clearskiiin UV Smashers	0–3	NU-Archipelago Builders Bulldogs	13–25	16–25	18–25			47–75	P2
Nov. 19	3:30 pm	MOA	FEU-DN Steel Tamaraws	2–3	Criss Cross King Crunchers	22–25	18–25	25–22	25–19	10–15	100–106	P2
Nov. 21	3:30 pm	PSA	Savouge Spin Doctors	3–1	Clearskiiin UV Smashers	23–25	25–16	25–20	25–17		98–78	

== Semifinals ==
- All times are Philippine Standard Time (UTC+8:00).

=== Ranking ===
Pos	Team	Pld	W	L	Pts	SW	SL	SR	SPW	SPL	SPR	Qualification
1	Criss Cross King Crunchers	0	0	0	0	0	0	—	0	0	—	Championship match
2	Savouge Spin Doctors	0	0	0	0	0	0	—	0	0	—	Championship match
3	NU-Archipelago Builders Bulldogs	0	0	0	0	0	0	—	0	0	—	3rd place match
4	FEU-DN Steel Tamaraws	0	0	0	0	0	0	—	0	0	—	3rd place match
5	ProVolley Academy	0	0	0	0	0	0	—	0	0	—	
6	Surabaya BIN Samator	0	0	0	0	0	0	—	0	0	—	

Updated to match(es) played on November 23, 2026. Source: Spikers' Turf – Standings

=== Match results ===
- All times are Philippine Standard Time (UTC+08:00).

Date	Time	Venue		Score		Set 1	Set 2	Set 3	Set 4	Set 5	Total	Report
Nov. 23	1:00 pm	FIL	ProVolley Academy	–	Surabaya BIN Samator	–	–	–	–	–	0–0	
Nov. 23	3:00 pm	FIL	Criss Cross King Crunchers	–	NU-Archipelago Builders Bulldogs	–	–	–	–	–	0–0	
Nov. 23	5:00 pm	FIL	FEU-DN Steel Tamaraws	–	Savouge Spin Doctors	–	–	–	–	–	0–0	
Nov. 25	1:00 pm	FIL	NU-Archipelago Builders Bulldogs	–	ProVolley Academy	–	–	–	–	–	0–0	
Nov. 25	3:00 pm	FIL	Savouge Spin Doctors	–	Criss Cross King Crunchers	–	–	–	–	–	0–0	
Nov. 25	5:00 pm	FIL	Surabaya BIN Samator	–	FEU-DN Steel Tamaraws	–	–	–	–	–	0–0	
Nov. 27	1:00 pm	FIL	NU-Archipelago Builders Bulldogs	–	Savouge Spin Doctors	–	–	–	–	–	0–0	
Nov. 27	3:00 pm	FIL	Surabaya BIN Samator	–	Criss Cross King Crunchers	–	–	–	–	–	0–0	
Nov. 27	5:00 pm	FIL	ProVolley Academy	–	FEU-DN Steel Tamaraws	–	–	–	–	–	0–0	
Nov. 29	1:00 pm	FIL	Savouge Spin Doctors	–	Surabaya BIN Samator	–	–	–	–	–	0–0	
Nov. 29	3:00 pm	FIL	Criss Cross King Crunchers	–	ProVolley Academy	–	–	–	–	–	0–0	
Nov. 29	5:00 pm	FIL	FEU-DN Steel Tamaraws	–	NU-Archipelago Builders Bulldogs	–	–	–	–	–	0–0	
Nov. 30	1:00 pm	FIL	ProVolley Academy	–	Savouge Spin Doctors	–	–	–	–	–	0–0	
Nov. 30	3:00 pm	FIL	NU-Archipelago Builders Bulldogs	–	Surabaya BIN Samator	–	–	–	–	–	0–0	
Nov. 30	5:00 pm	FIL	Criss Cross King Crunchers	–	FEU-DN Steel Tamaraws	–	–	–	–	–	0–0	

== Third place match ==
December 2; 3:00 pm	v	Playtime Filoil Centre, San Juan

== Finals ==
December 2; 5:00 pm	v	Playtime Filoil Centre, San Juan

== Final standing ==
Rank	Team
1st place, gold medalist(s)	
2nd place, silver medalist(s)	
3rd place, bronze medalist(s)	
4	
5	
6	
7	Alpha Insurance Protectors
8	Clearskiiin UV Smashers
9	AEP Cabstars
10	VNS Laticrete Griffins
11	3B Event Masters
12	AFP Cav Spikers

2026 Spikers' Turf Invitational champions
TBD
? title

Team roster:
TBD
Head coach:
TBD

== STPC player of the week ==
Week	Player	Team	Ref.
October 10–17	Axel Van Book	Alpha Insurance Protectors	
October 20–25	Obed Mukaba	NU-Archipelago Builders Bulldogs	
November 3–8	Adrian Villados	Criss Cross King Crunchers	
November 10–15	EJ Casaña	Alpha Insurance Protectors	
November 17–21	Lirick Mendoza	FEU-DN Steel Tamaraws	

== See also ==
- 2026–27 Premier Volleyball League All-Filipino Conference
