= 2025–26 Spikers' Turf season =

Ninth season of the Spikers' Turf

- League: Spikers' Turf
- Sport: Volleyball
- Duration: October 27, 2025 – April 19, 2026
- TV partner(s): One Sports; One Sports+
- Streaming partner: Pilipinas Live

Conferences
- Invitational champions: Criss Cross King Crunchers
- Invitational runners-up: Kindai University
- Open champions: Criss Cross King Crunchers
- Open runners-up: Savouge Spin Doctors

Spiker's Turf seasons
- ← 2024–25 2026–27 →

The 2025–26 Spikers' Turf season was the ninth season of Spikers' Turf. The season began on October 27, 2025 with the start of the 2025 Invitational Conference, and ended on April 19, 2026 with the culmination of the 2026 Open Conference. The 2026 Volleyball All-Star Showcase was held in Candon, Ilocos Sur on May 1, its first all-star match since 2017.

This is the league's first season following the calendar shift, meaning that seasons will now run from the second half of the year to the first half of the following calendar year.

== 2025 Invitational Conference ==
The first conference will be the Invitational Conference, which will start on October 27.

=== Participating teams ===
2025 Spikers' Turf Invitational Conference
Abbr.	Team	Affiliation	Head coach	Team captain
Local regular teams
ALP	Alpha Insurance Protectors	Alpha Insurance & Surety Company Inc.	(Philippines) Mike Santos	(Philippines) Jefferson Abuniawan
CSS	Cignal Super Spikers	Cignal TV, Inc.	(Philippines) Dexter Clamor	(Philippines) John Paul Bugaoan
CKC	Criss Cross King Crunchers	Republic Biscuit Corporation	(Thailand) Tai Bundit	(Philippines) Ysay Marasigan
PJN	PGJC-Navy Sea Lions	Philippine Navy	(Philippines) George Pascua	(Philippines) Greg Dolor
SVG	Savouge Spin Doctors	Savouge Aesthetics Philippines	(Philippines) Sydney Calderon	(Philippines) Hero Austria
VNS	VNS Griffins	VNS Management Group	(Philippines) Ralph Raymund Ocampo	(Philippines) Jerremy Pedrosa
2025 V-League Collegiate Challenge qualifying teams
FEU	Far Eastern University–DN Steel (champions)	Far Eastern University / DN Group	(Philippines) Eddieson Orcullo	(Philippines) Ariel Cacao
UST	University of Santo Tomas–Gameville (third-place)	University of Santo Tomas / Gameville	(Philippines) Odjie Mamon	(Philippines) Dux Euan Yambao
Foreign guest teams
KDU	Kindai University (Japan)		(Japan) Hideyuki Mitsuyama	(Japan) Yuu Kubota
PVA	ProVolley Academy (Australia)		(Greece) Aristeidis Papadopoulos	(Australia) Samuel Hansen

- The De La Salle University, the runners-up of the 2025 V-League Collegiate Challenge originally qualified but withdrew due to academic commitments. UST was their replacements.

=== Preliminary round ===
Pos	Team	Pld	W	L	Pts	SW	SL	SR	SPW	SPL	SPR	Qualification
1	Criss Cross King Crunchers	7	7	0	20	21	5	4.200	628	512	1.227	Final round
2	Cignal Super Spikers	7	5	2	14	17	9	1.889	626	582	1.076	Final round
3	University of Santo Tomas–Gameville	7	5	2	13	16	12	1.333	658	652	1.009	Final round
4	Savouge Spin Doctors	7	4	3	12	13	12	1.083	599	571	1.049	Final round
5	Alpha Insurance Protectors	7	3	4	10	15	15	1.000	675	677	0.997	
6	Far Eastern University–DN Steel	7	2	5	9	13	16	0.813	659	643	1.025	
7	VNS Griffins	7	1	6	3	7	19	0.368	538	630	0.854	
8	PGJC–Navy Sea Lions	7	1	6	3	5	19	0.263	491	591	0.831	

Source: Spikers' Turf – Standings

=== Final round ===
==== Semifinals ====
Pos	Team	Pld	W	L	Pts	SW	SL	SR	SPW	SPL	SPR	Qualification
1	Kindai University	5	4	1	12	13	5	2.600	430	366	1.175	Championship match
2	Criss Cross King Crunchers	5	4	1	10	13	8	1.625	482	417	1.156	Championship match
3	Savouge Spin Doctors	5	3	2	10	12	7	1.714	427	396	1.078	3rd place match
4	Cignal Super Spikers	5	3	2	10	11	7	1.571	415	378	1.098	3rd place match
5	University of Santo Tomas–Gameville	5	1	4	3	6	12	0.500	357	402	0.888	
6	ProVolley Academy	5	0	5	0	0	15	0.000	223	375	0.595	

Source: Spikers' Turf – Standings

==== Finals ====
===== 3rd place =====
Date	Time	Venue		Score		Set 1	Set 2	Set 3	Set 4	Set 5	Total	Report
Nov. 29	3:00 pm	FIL	Savouge Spin Doctors	2–3	Cignal Super Spikers	18–25	25–17	25–23	19–25	12–15	99–105	P2

===== Championship =====
Date	Time	Venue		Score		Set 1	Set 2	Set 3	Set 4	Set 5	Total	Report
Nov. 29	5:00 pm	FIL	Kindai University	2–3	Criss Cross King Crunchers	15–25	23–25	25–23	25–23	20–22	108–118	P2

=== Awards ===
Award	Player	Team	Ref.
Conference Most Valuable Player	Jude Garcia	Criss Cross	
Finals Most Valuable Player	Adrian Villados	Criss Cross	
1st Best Outside Spiker	Jude Garcia	Criss Cross	
2nd Best Outside Spiker	Joshua Umandal	Cignal	
1st Best Middle Blocker	Giles Jeffer Torres	Savouge	
2nd Best Middle Blocker	Edlyn Paul Colinares	Criss Cross	
Best Opposite Spiker	Ryutaro Aun	Kindai University	
Best Setter	Adrian Villados	Criss Cross	
Best Libero	Yuito Kose	Kindai University	

=== Final standings ===
Rank	Team
1st place, gold medalist(s)	Criss Cross King Crunchers
2nd place, silver medalist(s)	Kindai University
3rd place, bronze medalist(s)	Cignal Super Spikers
4	Savouge Spin Doctors
5	University of Santo Tomas–Gameville
6	ProVolley Academy
7	Alpha Insurance Protectors
8	Far Eastern University–DN Steel
9	VNS Griffins
10	PGJC-Navy Sea Lions

== 2026 Open Conference ==
The final conference of the season was the 2026 Open Conference, which ran from February 25 to April 19, 2026.

=== Participating teams ===
2026 Spikers' Turf Open Conference
Abbr.	Team	Affiliation	Head coach	Team captain
TEM	3B Event Masters	3B Production & Entertainment	(Philippines) Arjay Francisco	Bonjomar Castel
ALP	Alpha Insurance Protectors	Alpha Insurance & Surety Company Inc.	(Philippines) Mike Santos	Jefferson Abuniawan
CAB	AEP Cabstars	Cabstars Men's Volleyball Team / Cabuyao	(Philippines) Kitty Antiporta	Miguel Andrew Dasig
CKC	Criss Cross King Crunchers	Republic Biscuit Corporation	(Thailand) Tai Bundit	Ysay Marasigan
SVG	Savouge Spin Doctors	Savouge Aesthetics Philippines	(Philippines) Sydney Calderon	Hero Austria
VNS	VNS Griffins	VNS Management Group	(Philippines) Ralph Raymund Ocampo	John Joshua Cruz

=== Preliminary round ===
Pos	Team	Pld	W	L	Pts	SW	SL	SR	SPW	SPL	SPR	Qualification
1	Criss Cross King Crunchers	10	10	0	30	30	2	15.000	721	501	1.439	Semifinal round
2	Savouge Spin Doctors	10	8	2	23	25	10	2.500	757	619	1.223	Semifinal round
3	Alpha Insurance Protectors	10	5	5	16	19	15	1.267	740	720	1.028	Semifinal round
4	AEP Cabstars	10	5	5	15	16	16	1.000	701	716	0.979	Semifinal round
5	3B Event Masters	10	2	8	5	7	27	0.259	637	814	0.783	
6	VNS Griffins	10	0	10	1	3	30	0.100	614	801	0.767	

Source: Spikers' Turf – Standings

=== Final round ===
==== Semifinals ====
Pos	Team	Pld	W	L	Pts	SW	SL	SR	SPW	SPL	SPR	Qualification
1	Savouge Spin Doctors	3	3	0	8	9	3	3.000	280	244	1.148	Finals
2	Criss Cross King Crunchers	3	2	1	7	8	4	2.000	285	253	1.126	Finals
3	AEP Cabstars	3	1	2	3	5	7	0.714	256	283	0.905	3rd place match
4	Alpha Insurance Protectors	3	0	3	0	1	9	0.111	217	258	0.841	3rd place match

Source: Spikers' Turf – Standings

==== Finals ====
===== 3rd place =====
AEP Cabstars wins series, 2–0

Date	Time	Venue		Score		Set 1	Set 2	Set 3	Set 4	Set 5	Total	Report
Apr. 15	15:00	FIL	AEP Cabstars	3–0	Alpha Insurance Protectors	26–24	25–23	25–20			76–67	P2
Apr. 17	15:00	FIL	Alpha Insurance Protectors	1–3	AEP Cabstars	22–25	21–25	25–23	23–25		91–98	P2

===== Championship =====
Criss Cross wins series, 2–1

Date	Time	Venue		Score		Set 1	Set 2	Set 3	Set 4	Set 5	Total	Report
Apr. 15	17:00	FIL	Savouge Spin Doctors	1–3	Criss Cross King Crunchers	20–25	28–26	18–25	20–25		86–101	P2
Apr. 17	17:00	FIL	Criss Cross King Crunchers	0–3	Savouge Spin Doctors	22–25	21–25	19–25			62–75	P2
Apr. 19	16:00	FIL	Savouge Spin Doctors	1–3	Criss Cross King Crunchers	26–28	17–25	28–26	23–25		94–104	P2

=== Awards ===
Award	Player	Team	Ref.
Conference Most Valuable Player	Jude Garcia	Criss Cross	
Finals Most Valuable Player	Jude Garcia	Criss Cross	
1st Best Outside Spiker	Alche Gupiteo	Criss Cross	
2nd Best Outside Spiker	Sherwin Caritativo	Savouge	
1st Best Middle Blocker	John Paul Bugaoan	Savouge	
2nd Best Middle Blocker	Lloyd Josafat	Criss Cross	
Best Opposite Spiker	Jude Garcia	Criss Cross	
Best Setter	Adrian Villados	Criss Cross	
Best Libero	Vince Lorenzo	AEP Cabstars	

=== Final standings ===
Rank	Team
1st place, gold medalist(s)	Criss Cross King Crunchers
2nd place, silver medalist(s)	Savouge Spin Doctors
3rd place, bronze medalist(s)	AEP Cabstars
4	Alpha Insurance Protectors
5	3B Event Masters
6	VNS Griffins

== All-Star Game ==
The league hosted an all-star game on May 1 after the Open Conference, their first since 2017. The event was part of the greater 2026 Volleyball All-Star Showcase in Candon, Ilocos Sur, which the league co-hosted together with the Premier Volleyball League.

== Conference results ==
Conference	Champion	Runner-up	3rd	4th	5th	6th	7th	8th	9th	10th
Invitational	Criss Cross	Kindai University	Cignal	Savouge	UST–Gameville	ProVolley Academy	Alpha Insurance	FEU–DN Steel	VNS	PGJC; Navy
Open	Criss Cross	Savouge	AEP	Alpha Insurance	3B Event	VNS	—N/a			
