= 2026–27 Spikers' Turf season =

Men's volleyball season in the Philippines

- 10th anniversary logo
- League: Spikers' Turf
- Sport: Volleyball
- Duration: October 10, 2026 – TBA 2027
- TV partner(s): One Sports; One Sports+
- Streaming partner(s): Cignal Play; One Sports YouTube Channel

Conferences

Spiker's Turf seasons
- ← 2025–26 2027–28 →

The 2026–27 Spikers' Turf season is the tenth season of Spikers' Turf. The season began on October 10, 2026 and will end sometime in the first half of 2027.

== 10th season celebrations ==
This season will be the league's tenth season, which includes the two seasons where it was integrated with its women's counterpart, the Premier Volleyball League, in 2017 and 2018. On September 3, 2026, Sports Vision announced that the opening matchday will be held at SM Seaside Cebu Arena in Cebu City, and that the PVL will open its tenth anniversary season on the same day. An extension of their co-hosting was announced on September 14, which will see Spikers' Turf matches played in between PVL matches in select matchdays throughout their respective seasons.

== 2026 Invitational Conference ==
The first conference will be the Invitational Conference, which was scheduled to start on October 10.

=== Participating teams ===
This tournament saw two new teams enter the league, with the first being the Clearskiiin UV Smashers, announced on September 11 as the sister team to the Savouge Spin Doctors. The Armed Forces of the Philippines made their return with a new unified team, the AFP Cav Spikers.

The eight member teams are joined by the top two teams in the 2026 V-League Collegiate Challenge, which were later determined to be the FEU-DN Steel Tamraws and NU-Archipelago Builders Bulldogs.

2025 Spikers' Turf Invitational Conference
Abbr.	Team	Affiliation	Head coach	Team captain
Local regular teams
AFP	AFP Cav Spikers	Armed Forces of the Philippines	(Philippines) Benjaylo Labide	Jessie Lopez
TEM	3B Event Masters	3B Production & Entertainment	(Philippines) Arjay Francisco	Bonjomar Castel
ALP	Alpha Insurance Protectors	Alpha Insurance & Surety Company Inc.	(Philippines) Mike Santos	Jefferson Abuniawan
CAB	AEP Cabstars	Cabstars Men's Volleyball Team / Cabuyao	(Philippines) Kitty Antiporta	Miguel Andrew Dasig
CUV	Clearskiiin UV Smashers	ClearSkiiin Philippines	(United States) Joe Bangit	Louis Gamban; JM Ronquillo
CKC	Criss Cross King Crunchers	Republic Biscuit Corporation	(Thailand) Tai Bundit	Ysay Marasigan
SVG	Savouge Spin Doctors	Savouge Aesthetics Philippines	(Philippines) Sydney Calderon	Hero Austria
VNS	VNS Laticrete Griffins	VNS Management Group	(Philippines) Ralph Raymund Ocampo	John Joshua Cruz
2026 V-League Collegiate Challenge qualifying teams
NUI	NU- Archipelago Builders Bulldogs	National University / Archipelago Builders Corporation	(Philippines) Dante Alinsunurin	Rwenzmel Taguibolos
FEU	FEU-DN Steel Tamaraws	Far Eastern University / DN Steel Group of Companies	(Philippines) Eddieson Orcullo	Zhydryx Saavedra
Foreign guest teams
	To be determined			
	To be determined			

=== Preliminary round ===
Pos	Team	Pld	W	L	Pts	SW	SL	SR	SPW	SPL	SPR	Qualification
1	Criss Cross King Crunchers	8	8	0	22	24	7	3.429	734	593	1.238	Final round
2	NU-Archipelago Builders Bulldogs	9	7	2	21	22	9	2.444	731	605	1.208	Final round
3	Savouge Spin Doctors	8	6	2	20	22	8	2.750	721	618	1.167	Final round
4	FEU-DN Steel Tamaraws	8	6	2	18	19	9	2.111	670	598	1.120	Final round
5	Alpha Insurance Protectors	9	6	3	17	20	12	1.667	746	695	1.073	
6	Clearskiiin UV Smashers	8	4	4	10	15	18	0.833	726	728	0.997	
7	AEP Cabstars	9	3	6	8	11	21	0.524	677	738	0.917	
8	VNS Laticrete Griffins	9	2	7	8	13	22	0.591	722	817	0.884	
9	3B Event Masters	9	1	8	4	7	25	0.280	618	755	0.819	
10	AFP Cav Spikers	9	0	9	1	5	27	0.185	601	789	0.762	

Updated to match(es) played on November 18, 2026. Source: Spikers' Turf – Standings

== Conference results ==
Conference	Champion	Runner-up	3rd	4th	5th	6th	7th	8th	9th	10th	11th	12th
Invitational	To be determined						Alpha Insurance	Clearskiiin UV	AEP	VNS	3B Event	AFP
Open	To be determined											
