= Dexter Clamor =

Filipino volleyball coach

Personal information
- Nationality: Filipino
- Hometown: Mariveles, Bataan
- Education: Perpetual Help

Coaching information
Previous teams coached
Years	Teams
2019–2025	Cignal HD Spikers

Volleyball information
- Position: Setter

Career
Years	Teams
2014–2016	Cignal HD Spikers

Dexter Clamor is a Filipino volleyball coach and former player.

== Playing career ==
Clamor was a setter for the Perpetual Help Altas. He was named in the training pool for the PLDT Home TVolution for the 2014 Asian Men's Club Volleyball Championship was unable to join due to personal reasons.

He later joined the Cignal HD Spikers of the Philippine Super Liga in 2014 helping the team win the 2014 Grand Prix. He played for Cignal in the Spikers' Turf for two more years.

== Coaching career ==
Clamor later transitioned as an assistant coach for Cignal, under head coaches Macky Cariño and Oliver Almadro. He succeeded Almadro, becoming head coach starting the 2019 Spikers' Turf season and led Cignal to the 2019 Reinforced Conference title in his first tournament as head coach.

Cignal appeared in seven more finals under Clamor's watch. The streak was broken in their final tournament, the 2025 Invitational Conference. The club took a leave of absence from the league in January 2026.

Clamor won six of nine Cignal's Spikers' Turf titles.

== Personal life ==
Hailing from Mariveles, Bataan, Clamor is a public school teacher by profession. After the disbandment of Cignal in 2026, Clamor set up the Next Level VolleyCamp in February 2026 a volleyball training camp.
