= 2026 Spikers' Turf season =

The 2026 Spikers' Turf season may refer to:

- 2025–26 Spikers' Turf season, held during the first half of 2026
- 2026–27 Spikers' Turf season, held during the second half of 2026
