= AFP Cav Spikers =

Men's volleyball team of the Armed Forces of the Philippines

- Short name: AFP
- Nickname: Cavaliers
- Head coach: Benjaylo Labide
- Captain: Jessie Lopez
- League: Spikers' Turf
- 2026 Invitational: 12th place

The AFP Cav Spikers, also known as the AFP Cavaliers, are the men's volleyball team of the Armed Forces of the Philippines (AFP).

== History ==
The AFP Cav Spikers made their Spikers' Turf debut at the 2026 Invitational Conference. This marks the return of the Armed Forces of the Philippines (AFP) in the men's volleyball league.

Previously the AFP was represented in the league by the teams of its three branches: Philippine Air Force Air Spikers, the Philippine Navy Sea Lions, and the Philippine Army Troopers

== Honors ==
Spikers' Turf:

Season	Conference	Title	Source
2026–27	Invitational	12th place	

== Team captains ==
- (Philippines) Jessie Lopez (2026–present)

== Coaches ==
- (Philippines) Benjaylo Labide (2026–present)
