= 3B Event Masters =

Philippine men's volleyball club

- History: RichMarc Sports 3B Elite Spikers; 2024; Chichi DHTSI Braderhood Titans; 2024; 3B Event Masters; 2026–present
- Head coach: Arjay Francisco
- Captain: Bonjomar Castel
- League: Spikers' Turf
- 2026 Invitational: 11th place

The 3B Event Masters are a men's volleyball team in the Philippines. The team competes in the Spikers' Turf.

== History ==
The 3B Event Masters debuted as the RichMarc Sports 3B Elite Spikers at the Spikers' Turf in the 2024 Open Conference. For the next tournament, the 2024 Invitational Conference, the club changed their name to the Chichi DHTSI Titans. The team returns as the 3B Event Masters for the 2026 Open Conference.

== Honors ==
Spikers' Turf:

Season	Conference	Title	Source
2024–25	Open	9th place	
2024–25	Invitational	11th place	
2024–25	Open	did not compete	—N/a
2025–26	Invitational	did not compete	—N/a
2025–26	Open	5th place	
2026–27	Invitational	11th place	

== Team captains ==
- (Philippines) Carlo Almario (2024)
- (Philippines) Jonathan Sorio (2024)
- (Philippines) Bonjomar Castel (2026–present)

== Coaches ==
- (Philippines) Arjay Francisco (2024, 2026–present)
- (Philippines) Roberto Javier (2024)
