= 2025 Spikers' Turf season =

The 2025 Spikers' Turf season may refer to:

- 2024–25 Spikers' Turf season, held during the first half of 2025
- 2025–26 Spikers' Turf season, held during the second half of 2025
