= Techo Volleyball Cambodia League =

Volleyball league in Cambodia

- Most recent season or competition: 2025 Techo Volleyball Cambodia League season
- Sport: Volleyball
- Founded: 2024; 2 years ago
- First season: 2024
- No. of teams: 8
- Country: Cambodia
- Continent: AVC (Asia)
- Most recent champion: Bodyguard Headquarters (2025)
- Most titles: Bodyguard Headquarters (2 titles)

Techo Volleyball Cambodia League (TFCL) is the top-flight men's volleyball league in Cambodia.

== History ==
The Techo Volleyball Cambodia League (TFCL) is the first professional volleyball league in Cambodia. The first season was held in 2024 with eight teams. Bodyguard Headquarters (BHQ) won the first two seasons with Visakha as losing finalists in both instances.

== Teams ==
Team	Joined TFCL	Last appearance
Bodyguard Headquarters	2024	2025
Intervention Division Three VC	2024	2025
Kandal	2024	2024
Ministry of Interior VC	2024	2025
Preah Sihanouk	2024	2024
Phnom Penh Municipal Police	2024	2025
Pursat	2024	2025
Takeo	2025	
Svay Rieng Municipal Police	2025	
Visakha	2024	2025
