= Clearskiiin UV Smashers =

Philippine men's volleyball club

- Short name: Clearskiiin
- Nickname: UV Smashers
- Founded: 2026
- Head coach: Joe Bangit
- Captain: Louis Gamban; JM Ronquillo
- League: Spikers' Turf
- 2026 Invitational: 8th place

The Clearskiiin UV Smashers are a men's volleyball team which plays in the Spikers' Turf of the Philippines.

== History ==
The Clearskiiin UV Smashers was established as a sister team of the Savouge Spin Doctors of the Spikers' Turf, a men's volleyball league in the Philippines. The team is named after a skin care brand.

The team was founded by Sydney Calderon and Luis Calderon to provide a team for players left without one following the disbandment of the Cignal HD Spikers in January 2026. It was officially launched on September 11, 2026, at Seda BGC in Taguig.

Joe Bangit is the inaugural coach of the team which debuted at the 2026 Invitational Conference which started in October.

== Honors ==
Spikers' Turf:

Season	Conference	Title	Source
2026–27	Invitational	8th place	

== Team captains ==
- (Philippines) Louis Gamban and (Philippines) JM Ronquillo (2026–present) Co-captains

== Coaches ==
- (Philippines) (United States) Joe Bangit (2026–present)
