= Volleyball All-Star Showcase =

Philippine volleyball exhibition matches

- Inaugurated: 2016 (Pasig)
- Previous event: 2026 (Candon)
- Participants: Premier Volleyball League and Spikers' Turf all-stars
- Organizer: Sports Vision
- 2026 Volleyball All-Star Showcase

The Volleyball All-Star Showcase is an exhibition event featuring all-star matches hosted by the two top-level volleyball leagues in the Philippines: the women's Premier Volleyball League and men's Spikers' Turf, both organized by Sports Vision. The Shakey's V-League also hosted an all-star match once in 2016.

The first instance was held in 2016 at PhilSports Arena in Pasig followed by two more events in 2017 and 2019 at Filoil Flying V Centre in San Juan. The all-star match returned under its current name in 2026 after a seven-year hiatus.

== History ==
Sports Vision organized the first exhibition event on November 20, 2016 at PhilSports Arena in Pasig. The event featured all-star matches hosted by the two leagues Sports Vision organized at the time: the women's Shakey's V-League and the men's Spikers' Turf. The event was held in support of victims of Super Typhoon Lawin, which had impacted the northern portion of Luzon a month prior.

The second event was held on October 29, 2017 at Filoil Flying V Centre in San Juan. By that point, the SVL and Spikers' Turf became a single entity, the Premier Volleyball League, operating the women's and men's divisions, respectively. The event was now branded as the Premier Volleyball League All-Star Game. Two teams are created for each division, Red and White for the women's side and Blue and Yellow for the men's side. The all-star match wasn't held in 2018, but returned in 2019 as a preseason event. Only a women's match took place after Spikers' Turf returned to being its own league. Both the 2017 and 2019 events were held in benefit of the Help Educate and Rear Orphans Foundation, or Hero Foundation.

On March 13, 2026, the PVL and Spikers' Turf announced a joint event known as the Volleyball All-Star Showcase, where both leagues will host their respective all-star matches. The matches are scheduled for May 1 at Candon City Arena in Candon, Ilocos Sur. It will be the PVL's first all-star match in seven years and their first as a professional league. Spikers' Turf will be hosting its first as a separate league in ten years and the first men's all-star match in nine years.

== Roster selection ==
In both the PVL All-Star Game and Spikers' Turf All-Star Game, 28 players are selected as all-stars for their respective leagues. Those 28 players are then separated into two teams of fourteen players.

Each team will field seven starters (which include two outside hitters, two middle blockers, one opposite hitter, one setter, and one libero) chosen through a combination of fan voting and votes from coaches. Players are nominated based on their statistical ranking and coaches cannot vote on players from their own team. The remaining seven players are selected by players, coaches, staff, and media.

Additionally, the head coaches of the top two teams from the preceding PVL or Spikers' Turf conference are chosen to led one of the two teams in their league's all-star match.

== Results ==
Year	Results		Host arena	Host city
Year	SVL/PVL (women's)	ST (men's)	Host arena	Host city
2016	Palaban 3–1 Puso	Galaw 3–1 Hataw	PhilSports Arena	Pasig
2017	Red 3–1 White	Yellow 3–2 Blue	Filoil Flying V Centre	San Juan
2019	Red 3–0 Blue	—N/a	Filoil Flying V Centre	San Juan
2026	Heart 3–1 Hustle	Power 3–1 Passion	Candon City Arena	Candon, Ilocos Sur

== Side events ==
In 2026, a variety of side events were introduced to go alongside the all-star matches. The three events are known as the Setter Challenge, Digging Challenge, and Serving Challenge. Specific mechanics for each event has yet to be announced.
