= 2026 Spikers' Turf Open Conference =

First Conference of the 2026 SPT season

- Duration: February 25, 2026 – April 19, 2026
- Teams: 6
- TV partner(s): One Sports; One Sports+ Pilipinas Live

Results
- Champions: Criss Cross King Crunchers
- Runners-up: Savouge Spin Doctors
- Third place: AEP Cabstars
- Fourth place: Alpha Insurance Protectors

Awards
- Conference MVP: Jude Garcia
- Finals MVP: Jude Garcia
- Best OH: Alche Gupiteo; Sherwin Caritativo
- Best MB: John Paul Bugaoan; Lloyd Josafat
- Best OPP: Jude Garcia
- Best Setter: Adrian Villados
- Best Libero: Vince Lorenzo

Spikers' Turf Open Conference chronology
- < 2025 2027 >

Spikers' Turf conference chronology
- < 2025 Invitational 2026 Invitational >

The 2026 Spikers' Turf Open Conference was the second conference of the 2025–26 season of Spikers' Turf. The tournament began on February 25 and ended on April 19, 2026.

Prior to the start of the season, nine-time champions Cignal left the league. 3B Event Masters and AEP Cabstars returned to the league. Criss Cross King Crunchers won their second consecutive title.

== Participating teams ==
2026 Spikers' Turf Open Conference
| Abbr. | Team | Affiliation | Head coach | Team captain |
|---|---|---|---|---|
| TEM | 3B Event Masters | 3B Production & Entertainment | (Philippines) Arjay Francisco | Bonjomar Castel |
| ALP | Alpha Insurance Protectors | Alpha Insurance & Surety Company Inc. | (Philippines) Mike Santos | Jefferson Abuniawan |
| CAB | AEP Cabstars | Cabstars Men's Volleyball Team / Cabuyao | (Philippines) Kitty Antiporta | Miguel Andrew Dasig |
| CKC | Criss Cross King Crunchers | Republic Biscuit Corporation | (Thailand) Tai Bundit | Ysay Marasigan |
| SVG | Savouge Spin Doctors | Savouge Aesthetics Philippines | (Philippines) Sydney Calderon | Hero Austria |
| VNS | VNS Griffins | VNS Management Group | (Philippines) Ralph Raymund Ocampo | John Joshua Cruz |

== Venues ==
The following are the game venues set for this conference:

| Preliminaries, Semifinals, Finals | Preliminaries |
| San Juan | Paco, Manila |
|---|---|
| Filoil Centre (FIL) | Paco Arena (PAC) |
| Capacity: 6,000 | Capacity: 1,000 |

== Format ==
Preliminary round

1. The six teams are competing in a double round-robin elimination.
2. Teams are ranked using the FIVB Ranking System.
3. Top four teams advance to the semifinals.

Semifinals

1. The four semifinalists will compete in a single round-robin elimination.
2. Teams are ranked using the FIVB Ranking System.
3. The third and fourth-ranked teams will be relegated to the 3rd place series.
4. The first and second-ranked teams will advance to the championship series.

Finals

1. Best-of-three series.
2. Bronze medal: SF Ranked 3 vs. SF Ranked 4
3. Gold medal: SF Ranked 1 vs. SF Ranked 2

== Pool standing procedure ==
- First, teams are ranked by the number of matches won.
- If the number of matches won is tied, the tied teams are then ranked by match points, wherein:
  - Match won 3–0 or 3–1: 3 match points for the winner, 0 match points for the loser.
  - Match won 3–2: 2 match points for the winner, 1 match point for the loser.
- In case of any further ties, the following criteria shall be used:
1. Set ratio: number of sets won divided by number of sets lost.
2. Setpoint ratio: number of points scored divided by number of points allowed.
3. Head-to-head standings: any remaining tied teams are ranked based on the results of head-to-head matches involving the teams in question.

== Preliminary round ==
=== Ranking ===
| Pos | Team | Pld | W | L | Pts | SW | SL | SR | SPW | SPL | SPR | Qualification |
|---|---|---|---|---|---|---|---|---|---|---|---|---|
| 1 | Criss Cross King Crunchers | 10 | 10 | 0 | 30 | 30 | 2 | 15.000 | 721 | 501 | 1.439 | Semifinal round |
| 2 | Savouge Spin Doctors | 10 | 8 | 2 | 23 | 25 | 10 | 2.500 | 757 | 619 | 1.223 | Semifinal round |
| 3 | Alpha Insurance Protectors | 10 | 5 | 5 | 16 | 19 | 15 | 1.267 | 740 | 720 | 1.028 | Semifinal round |
| 4 | AEP Cabstars | 10 | 5 | 5 | 15 | 16 | 16 | 1.000 | 701 | 716 | 0.979 | Semifinal round |
| 5 | 3B Event Masters | 10 | 2 | 8 | 5 | 7 | 27 | 0.259 | 637 | 814 | 0.783 | |
| 6 | VNS Griffins | 10 | 0 | 10 | 1 | 3 | 30 | 0.100 | 614 | 801 | 0.767 | |

Source: Spikers' Turf – Standings

=== Match results ===
- All times are Philippine Standard Time (UTC+08:00).

| Date | Time | Venue | | Score | | Set 1 | Set 2 | Set 3 | Set 4 | Set 5 | Total | Report |
First round
| Feb. 25 | 13:00 | FIL | Alpha Insurance Protectors | 3–0 | AEP Cabstars | 25–23 | 25–18 | 25–19 | | | 75–60 | P2 |
| Feb. 25 | 15:00 | FIL | VNS Griffins | 0–3 | Criss Cross King Crunchers | 17–25 | 15–25 | 17–25 | | | 49–75 | P2 |
| Feb. 25 | 17:00 | FIL | 3B Event Masters | 0–3 | Savouge Spin Doctors | 15–25 | 17–25 | 20–25 | | | 52–75 | P2 |
| Feb. 27 | 15:00 | FIL | VNS Griffins | 0–3 | AEP Cabstars | 15–25 | 17–25 | 19–25 | | | 51–75 | P2 |
| Feb. 27 | 17:00 | FIL | Criss Cross King Crunchers | 3–0 | Alpha Insurance Protectors | 25–19 | 25–20 | 25–20 | | | 75–59 | P2 |
| Mar. 01 | 13:00 | FIL | AEP Cabstars | 0–3 | Criss Cross King Crunchers | 20–25 | 27–29 | 15–25 | | | 62–79 | P2 |
| Mar. 01 | 15:00 | FIL | 3B Event Masters | 3–2 | VNS Griffins | 25–20 | 25–19 | 25–27 | 21–25 | 15–13 | 111–104 | P2 |
| Mar. 01 | 17:00 | FIL | Savouge Spin Doctors | 3–1 | Alpha Insurance Protectors | 25–20 | 20–25 | 25–18 | 25–16 | | 95–79 | P2 |
| Mar. 04 | 15:00 | FIL | Savouge Spin Doctors | 3–0 | VNS Griffins | 25–16 | 25–17 | 25–22 | | | 75–55 | P2 |
| Mar. 04 | 17:00 | FIL | Alpha Insurance Protectors | 3–0 | 3B Event Masters | 25–21 | 25–15 | 26–24 | | | 76–60 | P2 |
| Mar. 06 | 15:00 | FIL | Criss Cross King Crunchers | 3–1 | 3B Event Masters | 22–25 | 25–10 | 25–13 | 25–15 | | 97–63 | P2 |
| Mar. 06 | 17:00 | FIL | AEP Cabstars | 0–3 | Savouge Spin Doctors | 22–25 | 21–25 | 16–25 | | | 59–75 | P2 |
| Mar. 08 | 13:00 | FIL | 3B Event Masters | 0–3 | AEP Cabstars | 20–25 | 20–25 | 21–25 | | | 61–75 | P2 |
| Mar. 08 | 15:00 | FIL | VNS Griffins | 0–3 | Alpha Insurance Protectors | 16–25 | 20–25 | 18–25 | | | 54–75 | P2 |
| Mar. 08 | 17:00 | FIL | Savouge Spin Doctors | 0–3 | Criss Cross King Crunchers | 23–25 | 27–29 | 17–25 | | | 67–79 | P2 |
Second round
| Mar. 11 | 15:00 | FIL | 3B Event Masters | 3–1 | VNS Griffins | 25–17 | 26–24 | 14–25 | 25–23 | | 90–89 | P2 |
| Mar. 11 | 17:00 | FIL | Criss Cross King Crunchers | 3–0 | Alpha Insurance Protectors | 25–17 | 25–18 | 25–13 | | | 75–48 | P2 |
| Mar. 13 | 13:00 | FIL | VNS Griffins | 0–3 | AEP Cabstars | 18–25 | 19–25 | 22–25 | | | 59–75 | P2 |
| Mar. 13 | 15:00 | FIL | Alpha Insurance Protectors | 3–0 | 3B Event Masters | 25–20 | 25–14 | 25–19 | | | 75–53 | P2 |
| Mar. 13 | 17:00 | FIL | Criss Cross King Crunchers | 3–1 | Savouge Spin Doctors | 25–21 | 25–19 | 20–25 | 25–19 | | 95–84 | P2 |
| Mar. 18 | 15:00 | FIL | 3B Event Masters | 0–3 | Savouge Spin Doctors | 8–25 | 13–25 | 13–25 | | | 34–75 | P2 |
| Mar. 18 | 17:00 | FIL | AEP Cabstars | 0–3 | Criss Cross King Crunchers | 12–25 | 14–25 | 13–25 | | | 39–75 | P2 |
| Mar. 20 | 13:00 | FIL | Criss Cross King Crunchers | 3–0 | VNS Griffins | 25–17 | 25–14 | 25–12 | | | 75–43 | P2 |
| Mar. 20 | 15:00 | FIL | AEP Cabstars | 3–0 | 3B Event Masters | 25–23 | 25–13 | 25–23 | | | 75–59 | P2 |
| Mar. 20 | 17:00 | FIL | Savouge Spin Doctors | 3–2 | Alpha Insurance Protectors | 21–25 | 20–25 | 25–21 | 25–14 | 15–9 | 106–94 | P2 |
| Mar. 24 | 15:00 | PAC | AEP Cabstars | 3–1 | Alpha Insurance Protectors | 25–17 | 25–21 | 19–25 | 25–21 | | 94–84 | P2 |
| Mar. 24 | 17:00 | PAC | Savouge Spin Doctors | 3–0 | VNS Griffins | 25–21 | 25–23 | 25–20 | | | 75–64 | P2 |
| Mar. 27 | 13:00 | PAC | VNS Griffins | 0–3 | Alpha Insurance Protectors | 21–25 | 12–25 | 15–25 | | | 48–75 | P2 |
| Mar. 27 | 15:00 | PAC | Savouge Spin Doctors | 3–1 | AEP Cabstars | 25–21 | 23–25 | 25–20 | 25–21 | | 98–87 | P2 |
| Mar. 27 | 17:00 | PAC | Criss Cross King Crunchers | 3–0 | 3B Event Masters | 25–23 | 25–15 | 25–16 | | | 75–54 | P2 |

== Final round ==
- All times are Philippine Standard Time (UTC+8:00).

=== Semifinals ===
==== Ranking ====
| Pos | Team | Pld | W | L | Pts | SW | SL | SR | SPW | SPL | SPR | Qualification |
|---|---|---|---|---|---|---|---|---|---|---|---|---|
| 1 | Savouge Spin Doctors | 3 | 3 | 0 | 8 | 9 | 3 | 3.000 | 280 | 244 | 1.148 | Finals |
| 2 | Criss Cross King Crunchers | 3 | 2 | 1 | 7 | 8 | 4 | 2.000 | 285 | 253 | 1.126 | Finals |
| 3 | AEP Cabstars | 3 | 1 | 2 | 3 | 5 | 7 | 0.714 | 256 | 283 | 0.905 | 3rd place match |
| 4 | Alpha Insurance Protectors | 3 | 0 | 3 | 0 | 1 | 9 | 0.111 | 217 | 258 | 0.841 | 3rd place match |

Source: Spikers' Turf – Standings

=== Match results ===
| Date | Time | Venue | | Score | | Set 1 | Set 2 | Set 3 | Set 4 | Set 5 | Total | Report |
|---|---|---|---|---|---|---|---|---|---|---|---|---|
| Apr. 08 | 15:00 | FIL | AEP Cabstars | 3–1 | Alpha Insurance Protectors | 22–25 | 25–19 | 25–16 | 29–27 | | 101–87 | P2 |
| Apr. 08 | 17:00 | FIL | Criss Cross King Crunchers | 2–3 | Savouge Spin Doctors | 22–25 | 25–19 | 25–20 | 23–25 | 13–15 | 108–104 | P2 |
| Apr. 10 | 15:00 | FIL | Savouge Spin Doctors | 3–1 | AEP Cabstars | 25–27 | 25–15 | 25–19 | 25–16 | | 100–77 | P2 |
| Apr. 10 | 17:00 | FIL | Alpha Insurance Protectors | 0–3 | Criss Cross King Crunchers | 29–31 | 22–25 | 20–25 | | | 71–81 | P2 |
| Apr. 12 | 15:00 | FIL | Criss Cross King Crunchers | 3–1 | AEP Cabstars | 21–25 | 25–19 | 25–17 | 25–17 | | 96–78 | P2 |
| Apr. 12 | 17:00 | FIL | Alpha Insurance Protectors | 0–3 | Savouge Spin Doctors | 20–25 | 15–25 | 24–26 | | | 59–76 | P2 |

=== Finals ===
==== Third place series ====
AEP Cabstars wins series, 2–0

| Date | Time | Venue | | Score | | Set 1 | Set 2 | Set 3 | Set 4 | Set 5 | Total | Report |
|---|---|---|---|---|---|---|---|---|---|---|---|---|
| Apr. 15 | 15:00 | FIL | AEP Cabstars | 3–0 | Alpha Insurance Protectors | 26–24 | 25–23 | 25–20 | | | 76–67 | P2 |
| Apr. 17 | 15:00 | FIL | Alpha Insurance Protectors | 1–3 | AEP Cabstars | 22–25 | 21–25 | 25–23 | 23–25 | | 91–98 | P2 |

==== Championship ====
Criss Cross wins series, 2–1

| Date | Time | Venue | | Score | | Set 1 | Set 2 | Set 3 | Set 4 | Set 5 | Total | Report |
|---|---|---|---|---|---|---|---|---|---|---|---|---|
| Apr. 15 | 17:00 | FIL | Savouge Spin Doctors | 1–3 | Criss Cross King Crunchers | 20–25 | 28–26 | 18–25 | 20–25 | | 86–101 | P2 |
| Apr. 17 | 17:00 | FIL | Criss Cross King Crunchers | 0–3 | Savouge Spin Doctors | 22–25 | 21–25 | 19–25 | | | 62–75 | P2 |
| Apr. 19 | 16:00 | FIL | Savouge Spin Doctors | 1–3 | Criss Cross King Crunchers | 26–28 | 17–25 | 28–26 | 23–25 | | 94–104 | P2 |

== Final standing ==
| Rank | Team |
|---|---|
| 1st place, gold medalist(s) | Criss Cross King Crunchers |
| 2nd place, silver medalist(s) | Savouge Spin Doctors |
| 3rd place, bronze medalist(s) | AEP Cabstars |
| 4 | Alpha Insurance Protectors |
| 5 | 3B Event Masters |
| 6 | VNS Griffins |

2026 Spikers' Turf Open champions
Criss Cross King Crunchers
Second title

Team roster:
Ysay Marasigan (c), Jerico Adajar, Jaron Requinton, Philip Bagalay, Nico Almendras, Kim Malabunga, Jude Garcia, Rex Intal, Adrian Villados, Luca Mamone, Francis Saura, Gian Glorioso, John Philip Pepito, Noel Kampton, Manuel Sumanguid III, Edlyn Paul Colinares, Menard Guerrero, Alche Gupiteo, Lloyd Josafat, Elijah Kim
Head coach:
Anusorn Bundit

== Awards ==
| Award | Player | Team | Ref. |
|---|---|---|---|
| Conference Most Valuable Player | Jude Garcia | Criss Cross | |
| Finals Most Valuable Player | Jude Garcia | Criss Cross | |
| 1st Best Outside Spiker | Alche Gupiteo | Criss Cross | |
| 2nd Best Outside Spiker | Sherwin Caritativo | Savouge | |
| 1st Best Middle Blocker | John Paul Bugaoan | Savouge | |
| 2nd Best Middle Blocker | Lloyd Josafat | Criss Cross | |
| Best Opposite Spiker | Jude Garcia | Criss Cross | |
| Best Setter | Adrian Villados | Criss Cross | |
| Best Libero | Vince Lorenzo | AEP Cabstars | |

== STPC Player of the Week ==
| Week | Player | Team | Ref. |
|---|---|---|---|
| February 25–March 1 | Alche Gupiteo | Criss Cross King Crunchers | |
| March 4–8 | Jude Garcia | Criss Cross King Crunchers | |
| March 9–13 | Adrian Villados | Criss Cross King Crunchers | |
| March 18–20 | John Paul Bugaoan | Savouge Spin Doctors | |
| March 24–27 | Mark Calado | Savouge Spin Doctors | |
| April 8–12 | Vince Imperial | Savouge Spin Doctors | |

== See also ==
- 2026 Premier Volleyball League All-Filipino Conference
