= Jude Garcia =

Filipino beach and indoor volleyball player

Personal information
- Nationality: Filipino
- Born: 1997 or 1998 (age 27–28)
- Height: 180 cm (5 ft 11 in)
- Education: Far Eastern University

Beach volleyball information

Current teammate
Years	Teammate
2017–present	Anthony Lemuel Arbasto Jr.

Previous teammates
Years	Teammate
2019; 2023	Edmar Bonono; James Buytrago

Indoor volleyball information
- Position: Outside Hitter
- Current club: Criss Cross King Crunchers

National team
2026–	Philippines
Honours
Men's beach volleyball
Representing Philippines
SEA Games
Bronze medal – third place	2019 Philippines	Men's Beach
Bronze medal – third place	2021 Vietnam	Men's Beach
Bronze medal – third place	2021 Cambodia	Men's Beach

Jude Garcia (born 1997 or 1998) is a Filipino beach and indoor volleyball player. He played with FEU Tamaraws collegiate men's University team. He is currently playing for the Criss Cross King Crunchers in the Spikers' Turf.

== Career ==
=== Collegiate ===
Garcia play for the Tamaraws of the Far Eastern University in the University Athletic Association of the Philippines (UAAP). His best performance was in Season 81 (2019) when FEU lost to eventual champions NU Bulldogs in the final. He ended his stint with FEU last playing for them in Season 82, the tournament was later cancelled due to the COVID-19 pandemic.

=== Club ===
Jude Garcia played for the Cignal HD Spikers of the Spikers' Turf. He helped the team win the 2019 Reinforced Conference.

Garcia later returned to the Spikers' Turf in 2024, when he was named part of the initial roster of the then newly-formed Criss Cross King Crunchers. He was name Most Valuable Player five consecutive times with the latest honor attained in the 2026 Open Conference.

He is also a two-time Season MVP as recognized by the PVL Press Corps in the 2025 and 2026 Awards Nights.

=== National team ===
Garcia has played for the Philippine national team. He was first invited to the Philippine national team pool for the 2025 FIVB Men's Volleyball World Championship but had to decline due to him and his partner expecting the birth of their child at the time. He made his debut for the national team at the Candon leg of the 2026 SEA V Cup in July 2026.

== Personal life ==
Garcia has a son with his wife, Colen.

== Clubs ==
- (Philippines) Vice Co. Blockbusters (2018)
- (Philippines) Cignal HD Spikers (2019)
- (Philippines) Creamline Cool Smashers (beach volleyball) (2021–present)
- (Philippines) Criss Cross King Crunchers (2024–present)

== Awards ==
=== Individuals ===
Year	League	Season/Conference	Award	Ref
2016	UAAP	78 (Beach)	Rookie of the Year	
2019	UAAP	81 (Indoor)	2nd Best Outside Hitter	
2024	Spikers' Turf	Open	MVP (Conference)	
2024	Spikers' Turf	Invitational	MVP (Conference)	
2025	Spikers' Turf	Open	MVP (Conference)	
2025	Spikers' Turf	Invitational	MVP (Conference)	
2026	Spikers' Turf	Open	MVP (Conference)	

=== Collegiate ===
Year	League	Season/Conference	Title	Ref
2017	UAAP	79 (Indoor)	3rd place	
2017	PVL	Collegiate	Runners-up	
2018	UAAP	80 (Indoor)	3rd place	
2018	PVL	Collegiate	3rd place	
2019	UAAP	81 (Beach)	Runners-up	
2019	UAAP	81 (Indoor)	Runners-up	

=== Clubs ===
Year	League	Season/Conference	Club	Title	Ref
2018	Spikers' Turf	Open	Vice Co. Blockbusters	3rd place	
2019	Spikers' Turf	Reinforced	Cignal HD Spikers	Champions	
2024	Spikers' Turf	Open	Criss Cross King Crunchers	Runner-up	
2024	Spikers' Turf	Invitational	Criss Cross King Crunchers	Runner-up	
2025	Spikers' Turf	Open	Criss Cross King Crunchers	Runner-up	

=== International ===
==== Beach Volleyball ====
Year	Tournament	Partner	Title	Ref.
2019	SEA Games	Anthony Lemuel Arbasto Jr.	3rd place	
2021	SEA Games	Anthony Lemuel Arbasto Jr.	3rd place	
2021	AVC Beach Volleyball Continental Cup	Anthony Lemuel Arbasto Jr.	3rd place	
2023	SEA Games	James Buytrago	3rd place	
