= Adrian Villados =

Filipino volleyball player (born 1999)

Personal information
- Nationality: Filipino
- Born: December 9, 1999 (age 26); Rizal, Philippines
- Hometown: Binangonan, Rizal
- Education: Arellano

Volleyball information
- Position: Setter
- Current club: Criss Cross King Crunchers

Career
Years	Teams
2024–	Criss Cross King Crunchers

National team
2023–	Philippines

Adrian Villados is a Filipino volleyball player for the Criss Cross King Crunchers of the Spikers' Turf.

== Early life and education ==
Adrian Villados was born on December 9, 1999, in the province of Rizal in the Philippines. The municipality of Binangonan is his hometown. He entered the Arellano University as a high schooler in 2018 and accomplished his tertiary education in the institution.

== Career ==
=== Collegiate ===
Villados played for the Arellano Chiefs in the National Collegiate Athletic Association (NCAA). He has previously played for the Arellano's junior teams. He was part of the Arellano team which won their first ever men's volleyball title in NCAA Season 100 in 2025.

=== Club ===
In June 2024, Villados was signed in by the Criss Cross King Crunchers of the Spikers' Turf. They finished as runners-up to the Cignal HD Spikers in the 2024 Invitational Conference.

Villados helped Criss Cross win their first ever league title by winning the 2025 Invitational Conference. He was named Finals Most Valuable Player and Best Setter for the tournament.

=== National team ===
Villados has played for the Philippine national team. He made his debut at the 2022 Asian Games in Hangzhou, China which was held in September 2023. He made another appearance three years later by featuring in the 2026 SEA V Cup.
