= Owa Retamar =

Filipino volleyball player (born 2002)

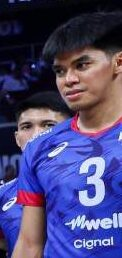
- Retamar in 2025

Personal information
- Full name: Ave Joshua Retamar
- Nickname: Owa
- Nationality: Filipino
- Born: March 7, 2000 (age 26); Manila, Philippines
- Hometown: San Pedro, Laguna
- Height: 183 cm (6 ft 0 in)
- Weight: 75.6 kg (167 lb)
- Education: National University

Volleyball information
- Position: Setter
- Current team: ORDU

Career
Years	Teams
2018–2023	Sta. Elena Ball Hammers
2024–2025	Cignal HD Spikers
2026–2026	Visakha
2026–	ORDU

National team
2019–	Philippines
Honours
Men's volleyball
Representing Philippines
SEA Games
Silver medal – second place	2019 Philippines	Team
Bronze medal – third place	2025 Thailand	Team

Ave Joshua "Owa" Retamar (born March 7, 2002) is a Filipino volleyball player. He is currently playing as a setter for Azerbaijani club ORDU.

== Early life and education ==
Ave Joshua Retamar, commonly known by his nickname Owa, was born on March 7, 2002, in Manila. He however is linked to San Pedro, Laguna, growing up in a family of "volleyball lovers". Owa Retamar himself took up volleyball when he was around second grade or seven or eight years old.

He studied at the University of Perpetual Help–Biñan for his high school studies before moving to the National University in Manila where he obtained his financial management degree in 2024.

== Career ==
=== Early years ===
Retamar when he was in sixth grade, he was selected by Batangas province to represent Calabarzon in a regional competition. Originally a libero, this marked Retamar's transition to a setter. He also played for the University of Perpetual Help–Biñan high school team. He was being scouted by the De La Salle Green Spikers before the NU Bulldogs made a last minute offer to convince him to commit to the collegiate team.

=== College ===
Retamar made his first game appearance with NU Bulldogs in the UAAP Season 82 in 2019 under coach Dante Alinsunurin. Later on, the tournament was cancelled due to the COVID-19 pandemic.

In 2023, UAAP men's volleyball tournament resumed in Season 85 after three years of being on a hiatus because of the COVID-19 pandemic. Retamar became the team captain of the NU Bulldogs. His team won the championship title and he bagged Finals MVP award.

=== Club ===
Retamar was signed by the Sta. Elena Ball Hammers in 2018. He won best Setter award in the 2019 Spikers' Turf Open Conference. His team bagged the bronze medal on that season. In 2022, he became the captain of the team.

After graduating from NU, Retamar joined the Cignal HD Spikers in May 2024. He helped Cignal win four Spikers' Turf championships and was named best setter three times. He stayed until the club's disbandment in January 2026.

The following month, Retamar joined Cambodian club Visakha for the Sar Kheng Cup. The team finished third in the tournament. Retamar later joined Visakha for the 2026 season for the Techo Volleyball Cambodia League where the club finished as runners-up.

Retamar made history joining Azerbaijani club ORDU, making him the first Filipino import to play in Europe, and is set to be the first Filipino to play in a CEV-sanctioned event (CEV Challenge Cup).

=== National team ===
In December 2019, Retamar made his debut for the Philippines national team helping them win the silver medal in the 30th SEA Games which was hosted at home.

Retamar returned to the national team at the 2024 AVC Men's Challenge Cup. He also played at the 2025 FIVB Men's Volleyball World Championship which was hosted by the Philippines as well as helped the national team win a bronze medal at the 2025 SEA Games in Thailand.

== Clubs ==
- (Philippines) Sta. Elena Ball Hammers (2018–2023)
- (Philippines) Cignal HD Spikers (2024–2025)
- (Cambodia) Visakha (2026–2026)
- (Azerbaijan) ORDU (2026–)

== Awards ==
=== Individual ===
Year	League	Season / Conference	Award	Ref
2019	Spikers' Turf	Open	Best Setter	
2022	Spikers' Turf	Open	Best Setter	
2023	UAAP	85	Best Setter	
2023	UAAP	85	MVP (Finals)	
2023	Spikers' Turf	Invitational	Best Setter	

=== Collegiate ===
==== NU Bulldogs ====
Year	League	Season / Conference	Title	Ref
2022	V-League	Collegiate	Champions	
2023	UAAP	85	Champions	

=== Clubs ===
Year	League	Season / Conference	Club	Title	Ref
2019	Spikers' Turf	Open	Sta. Elena Ball Hammers	3rd Place	
2022	Spikers' Turf	Open	NU-Sta. Elena Nationals	Champions	
2023	Spikers' Turf	Invitational	NU-Sta. Elena Nationals	Champions	
2024	Spikers' Turf	Invitational	Cignal HD Spikers	Champions	
2025	Spikers' Turf	Open	Cignal HD Spikers	Champions	
2026	Techo Volleyball Cambodia League	—N/a	Vishaka	Runners-up	

=== Other recognition ===
Year	Award Giving Body	Award	Ref
2024	Collegiate Press Corps Awards	UAAP Men's Volleyball Player of the Year	
