= AEP Cabstars =

Philippine men's volleyball club

- Full name: Cabstars Men's Volleyball Team
- Short name: Cabstars
- History: Cabstars–Cabuyao; 2023; AEP Cabstars; 2026–present
- Head coach: Christian Antiporta
- Captain: Miguel Andrew Dasig
- League: Spikers' Turf
- 2026 Invitational: 9th place

The Cabstars, playing as the AEP Cabstars due to sponsorship reasons, is a Philippine men's volleyball team representing Cabuyao, Laguna. The team competes in the Spikers' Turf.

== History ==
The AEP Cabstars debuted as the Cabstars–Cabuyao at the Spikers' Turf in the 2023 Invitational Conference representing the city of the Cabuyao, Laguna. The team returned as the AEP Cabstars for the 2026 Open Conference where they finished as bronze medalists.

== Honors ==
=== Team ===
Spikers' Turf:

Season	Conference	Title	Source
2023	Invitational	7th place	
2024–25	Open	did not compete	—N/a
2024–25	Invitational	did not compete	—N/a
2024–25	Open	did not compete	—N/a
2025–26	Invitational	did not compete	—N/a
2025–26	Open	3rd place	
2026–27	Invitational	9th place	

=== Individual ===
Spikers' Turf:

Season	Conference	Award	Name	Source
2026	Open	Best Libero	Vince Lorenzo	

== Team captains ==
- (Philippines) Aljune Centeno (2023)
- (Philippines) Miguel Andrew Dasig (2026–present)

== Coaches ==
- (Philippines) Christian Antiporta (2023, 2026–present)
