= 2025 Spikers' Turf Invitational Conference =

Second Conference of the 2025 SPT season

- Duration: October 27 – November 29, 2025
- Teams: 10
- TV partner(s): One Sports; One Sports+
- Streaming partner(s): Pilipinas Live

Results
- Champions: Criss Cross King Crunchers
- Runners-up: Kindai University
- Third place: Cignal Super Spikers
- Fourth place: Savouge Spin Doctors

Awards
- Conference MVP: Jude Garcia
- Finals MVP: Adrian Villados
- Best OH: Jude Garcia; Joshua Umandal
- Best MB: Giles Jeffer Torres; Edlyn Paul Colinares
- Best OPP: Ryutaro Aun
- Best Setter: Adrian Villados
- Best Libero: Yuito Kose

Spikers' Turf Invitational Conference chronology
- < 2024 2026 >

Spikers' Turf conference chronology
- < 2025 Open 2026 Open >

The 2025 Spikers' Turf Invitational Conference was the first conference of the 2025–26 season of Spikers' Turf. The tournament began on October 27, 2025 and ended on November 29, 2025.

Ten teams are battling for the championship, including two foreign guest teams which has byes to the semifinals.

== Participating teams ==
2025 Spikers' Turf Invitational Conference
Abbr.	Team	Affiliation	Head coach	Team captain
Local regular teams
ALP	Alpha Insurance Protectors	Alpha Insurance & Surety Company Inc.	(Philippines) Mike Santos	(Philippines) Jefferson Abuniawan
CSS	Cignal Super Spikers	Cignal TV, Inc.	(Philippines) Dexter Clamor	(Philippines) John Paul Bugaoan
CKC	Criss Cross King Crunchers	Republic Biscuit Corporation	(Thailand) Tai Bundit	(Philippines) Ysay Marasigan
PJN	PGJC-Navy Sea Lions	Philippine Navy	(Philippines) George Pascua	(Philippines) Greg Dolor
SVG	Savouge Spin Doctors	Savouge Aesthetics Philippines	(Philippines) Sydney Calderon	(Philippines) Hero Austria
VNS	VNS Griffins	VNS Management Group	(Philippines) Ralph Raymund Ocampo	(Philippines) Jerremy Pedrosa
2025 V-League Collegiate Challenge qualifying teams
FEU	Far Eastern University–DN Steel (champions)	Far Eastern University / DN Group	(Philippines) Eddieson Orcullo	(Philippines) Ariel Cacao
UST	University of Santo Tomas–Gameville (third-place)	University of Santo Tomas / Gameville	(Philippines) Odjie Mamon	(Philippines) Dux Euan Yambao
Foreign guest teams
KDU	Kindai University (Japan)		(Japan) Hideyuki Mitsuyama	(Japan) Yuu Kubota
PVA	ProVolley Academy (Australia)		(Greece) Aristeidis Papadopoulos	(Australia) Samuel Hansen

- The De La Salle University, the runners-up of the 2025 V-League Collegiate Challenge originally qualified but withdrew due to academic commitments. UST was their replacements.

== Venues ==
Preliminaries, Semifinals, Finals	Semifinals		Preliminaries
San Juan	Quezon City	Rodriguez, Rizal	Manila
Filoil Centre (FIL)	Smart Araneta Coliseum (SAC)	Ynares Center II (YC2)	Paco Arena (PAC)
Capacity: 6,000	Capacity: 20,000	Capacity: 8,000	Capacity: 1,000

== Format ==
Preliminary round

- The preliminary round will be a single round-robin tournament between the eight local teams. Each team will play one match against all other teams for a total of seven matches. Teams will be ranked using the FIVB Ranking System.
- The top four teams will advance to the semifinals.
- Teams ranked fifth to eighth will be eliminated and be ranked from seventh to tenth in the final standings.

Semifinals

- The semifinals will be another single round-robin between the top four teams from the prelims and the two foreign guest teams. All teams will have played a total of five matches in the semifinals. Teams will continue to be ranked using the FIVB Ranking System.
- The top two teams will advance to the championship match while teams ranked third and fourth will play in the third-place match.
- Teams ranked fifth and sixth will be eliminated and be ranked accordingly in the final standings.

Finals

- Both the championship (gold medal) and third-place (bronze medal) matches will be singular matches.
- The match-ups will be based on results from the semifinals:
  - Championship match: 1st ranked team vs. 2nd ranked team
  - Third-place match: 3rd ranked team vs. 4th ranked team

== Transactions ==
=== National team players ===
Players who are part of the Philippines men's national team will be released by the participating clubs in November 2025 as part of their preparations for the 2025 SEA Games. Affected teams will be allowed to sign substitute players to replace the national team players once they leave.

Team	Player/s
Cignal Super Spikers	Owa Retamar; Lloyd Josafat; Vince Lorenzo; Louie Ramirez
Criss Cross King Crunchers	Marck Espejo; Kim Malabunga; Eco Adajar
University of Santo Tomas–Gameville	Josh Ybañez

== Preliminary round ==
- All times are Philippine Standard Time (UTC+08:00).
- On November 9, the league postponed its scheduled matches on Sunday, at the Filoil EcoOil Centre in San Juan as the country braces for the anticipated onslaught of Super Typhoon Uwan.

=== Ranking ===
Pos	Team	Pld	W	L	Pts	SW	SL	SR	SPW	SPL	SPR	Qualification
1	Criss Cross King Crunchers	7	7	0	20	21	5	4.200	628	512	1.227	Final round
2	Cignal Super Spikers	7	5	2	14	17	9	1.889	626	582	1.076	Final round
3	University of Santo Tomas–Gameville	7	5	2	13	16	12	1.333	658	652	1.009	Final round
4	Savouge Spin Doctors	7	4	3	12	13	12	1.083	599	571	1.049	Final round
5	Alpha Insurance Protectors	7	3	4	10	15	15	1.000	675	677	0.997	
6	Far Eastern University–DN Steel	7	2	5	9	13	16	0.813	659	643	1.025	
7	VNS Griffins	7	1	6	3	7	19	0.368	538	630	0.854	
8	PGJC–Navy Sea Lions	7	1	6	3	5	19	0.263	491	591	0.831	

Source: Spikers' Turf – Standings

=== Match results ===
Date	Time	Venue		Score		Set 1	Set 2	Set 3	Set 4	Set 5	Total	Report
Oct. 27	2:00 pm	FIL	Savouge Spin Doctors	1–3	Alpha Insurance Protectors	25–19	23–25	24–26	22–25		94–95	P2
Oct. 27	4:00 pm	FIL	Cignal Super Spikers	3–1	VNS Griffins	25–23	25–15	27–29	25–14		102–81	P2
Oct. 27	6:00 pm	FIL	Criss Cross King Crunchers	3–1	PGJC–Navy Sea Lions	25–15	23–25	25–23	25–14		98–77	P2
Oct. 29	2:00 pm	PAC	Far Eastern University–DN Steel	1–3	Savouge Spin Doctors	22–25	21–25	25–23	21–25		89–98	P2
Oct. 29	4:00 pm	PAC	PGJC–Navy Sea Lions	0–3	University of Santo Tomas–Gameville	22–25	17–25	21–25			60–75	P2
Oct. 29	6:00 pm	PAC	Alpha Insurance Protectors	2–3	Cignal Super Spikers	25–20	22–25	25–21	23–25	11–15	106–106	P2
Oct. 31	2:00 pm	PAC	PGJC–Navy Sea Lions	1–3	Far Eastern University–DN Steel	23–25	16–25	33–31	17–25		89–106	P2
Oct. 31	4:00 pm	PAC	Savouge Spin Doctors	3–1	University of Santo Tomas–Gameville	26–24	25–20	22–25	25–20		98–89	P2
Oct. 31	6:00 pm	PAC	VNS Griffins	0–3	Criss Cross King Crunchers	14–25	15–25	21–25			50–75	P2
Nov. 02	2:00 pm	FIL	Far Eastern University–DN Steel	2–3	Alpha Insurance Protectors	25–22	23–25	25–18	22–25	16–18	111–108	P2
Nov. 02	4:00 pm	FIL	University of Santo Tomas–Gameville	3–1	VNS Griffins	25–19	25–19	26–28	25–22		101–88	P2
Nov. 02	6:00 pm	FIL	Criss Cross King Crunchers	3–1	Cignal Super Spikers	25–23	24–26	25–22	25–18		99–89	P2
Nov. 05	4:00 pm	PAC	Savouge Spin Doctors	0–3	Criss Cross King Crunchers	23–25	18–25	22–25			63–75	P2
Nov. 05	6:00 pm	PAC	Cignal Super Spikers	3–0	PGJC–Navy Sea Lions	25–19	25–14	25–21			75–54	P2
Nov. 07	2:00 pm	PAC	VNS Griffins	1–3	Savouge Spin Doctors	25–20	20–25	21–25	16–25		82–95	P2
Nov. 07	4:00 pm	PAC	University of Santo Tomas–Gameville	3–2	Alpha Insurance Protectors	26–24	25–22	35–37	19–25	22–20	127–128	P2
Nov. 07	6:00 pm	PAC	Far Eastern University–DN Steel	0–3	Cignal Super Spikers	24–26	20–25	22–25			66–76	P2
Nov. 12	10:00 am	PAC	Savouge Spin Doctors	3–0	PGJC–Navy Sea Lions	25–14	25–20	25–23			75–57	P2
Nov. 12	1:00 pm	PAC	Alpha Insurance Protectors	1–3	VNS Griffins	25–19	15–25	22–25	24–26		86–95	P2
Nov. 12	3:00 pm	PAC	University of Santo Tomas–Gameville	3–1	Cignal Super Spikers	25–23	22–25	28–26	25–20		100–94	P2
Nov. 12	5:00 pm	PAC	Far Eastern University–DN Steel	2–3	Criss Cross King Crunchers	25–22	22–25	16–25	25-21	15–17	103–89	P2
Nov. 14	10:00 am	PAC	VNS Griffins	0–3	Far Eastern University–DN Steel	16–25	21–25	18–25			55–75	P2
Nov. 14	1:00 pm	PAC	Criss Cross King Crunchers	3–0	University of Santo Tomas–Gameville	25–22	25–16	25–21			75–59	P2
Nov. 14	3:00 pm	PAC	PGJC–Navy Sea Lions	0–3	Alpha Insurance Protectors	18–25	21–25	19–25			58–75	P2
Nov. 14	5:00 pm	PAC	Cignal Super Spikers	3–0	Savouge Spin Doctors	34–32	25–22	25–22			84–76	P2
Nov. 16	1:00 pm	PAC	VNS Griffins	1–3	PGJC–Navy Sea Lions	25–21	21–25	19–25	22–25		87–96	P2
Nov. 16	3:00 pm	PAC	Alpha Insurance Protectors	1–3	Criss Cross King Crunchers	25–21	23–25	18–25	11–25		77–96	P2
Nov. 16	5:00 pm	PAC	Far Eastern University–DN Steel	2–3	University of Santo Tomas–Gameville	25–22	25–20	23–25	23–25	13–15	109–107	P2

== Final round ==
- All times are Philippine Standard Time (UTC+8:00).

=== Semifinals ===
==== Ranking ====
Pos	Team	Pld	W	L	Pts	SW	SL	SR	SPW	SPL	SPR	Qualification
1	Kindai University	5	4	1	12	13	5	2.600	430	366	1.175	Championship match
2	Criss Cross King Crunchers	5	4	1	10	13	8	1.625	482	417	1.156	Championship match
3	Savouge Spin Doctors	5	3	2	10	12	7	1.714	427	396	1.078	3rd place match
4	Cignal Super Spikers	5	3	2	10	11	7	1.571	415	378	1.098	3rd place match
5	University of Santo Tomas–Gameville	5	1	4	3	6	12	0.500	357	402	0.888	
6	ProVolley Academy	5	0	5	0	0	15	0.000	223	375	0.595	

Source: Spikers' Turf – Standings

==== Match results ====
Date	Time	Venue		Score		Set 1	Set 2	Set 3	Set 4	Set 5	Total	Report
Nov. 21	1:00 pm	SAC	Savouge Spin Doctors	3–1	University of Santo Tomas–Gameville	25–27	25–16	25–22	25–21		100–86	P2
Nov. 21	3:00 pm	SAC	Kindai University	3–0	ProVolley Academy	25–15	25–12	25–13			75–40	P2
Nov. 21	5:00 pm	SAC	Cignal Super Spikers	2–3	Criss Cross King Crunchers	24–26	25–22	22–25	26–24	12–15	109–112	P2
Nov. 22	1:00 pm	FIL	ProVolley Academy	0–3	Savouge Spin Doctors	15–25	13–25	19–25			47–75	P2
Nov. 22	3:00 pm	FIL	Criss Cross King Crunchers	1–3	Kindai University	22–25	22–25	25–19	22–25		91–94	P2
Nov. 22	5:00 pm	FIL	University of Santo Tomas–Gameville	0–3	Cignal Super Spikers	17–25	13–25	24–26			54–76	P2
Nov. 24	1:00 pm	FIL	Kindai University	3–0	University of Santo Tomas–Gameville	25–22	25–17	25–15			75–54	P2
Nov. 24	3:00 pm	FIL	Cignal Super Spikers	0–3	Savouge Spin Doctors	16–25	22–25	18–25			56–75	P2
Nov. 24	5:00 pm	FIL	ProVolley Academy	0–3	Criss Cross King Crunchers	9–25	9–25	13–25			31–75	P2
Nov. 25	1:00 pm	YC2	Kindai University	1–3	Cignal Super Spikers	20–25	21–25	26–24	18–25		85–99	P2
Nov. 25	3:00 pm	YC2	University of Santo Tomas–Gameville	3–0	ProVolley Academy	25–16	25–21	25–16			75–53	P2
Nov. 25	5:00 pm	YC2	Criss Cross King Crunchers	3–2	Savouge Spin Doctors	25–19	25–14	23–25	18–25	15–12	106–95	P2
Nov. 27	1:00 pm	FIL	University of Santo Tomas–Gameville	1–3	Criss Cross King Crunchers	17–25	25–23	23–25	23–25		88–98	P2
Nov. 27	3:00 pm	FIL	ProVolley Academy	0–3	Cignal Super Spikers	13–25	19–25	20–25			52–75	P2
Nov. 27	5:00 pm	FIL	Savouge Spin Doctors	1–3	Kindai University	16–25	28–26	20–25	18–25		82–101	P2

=== Finals ===
==== 3rd place ====
Date	Time	Venue		Score		Set 1	Set 2	Set 3	Set 4	Set 5	Total	Report
Nov. 29	3:00 pm	FIL	Savouge Spin Doctors	2–3	Cignal Super Spikers	18–25	25–17	25–23	19–25	12–15	99–105	P2

==== Championship ====
Date	Time	Venue		Score		Set 1	Set 2	Set 3	Set 4	Set 5	Total	Report
Nov. 29	5:00 pm	FIL	Kindai University	2–3	Criss Cross King Crunchers	15–25	23–25	25–23	25–23	20–22	108–118	P2

== Final standing ==
Rank	Team
1st place, gold medalist(s)	Criss Cross King Crunchers
2nd place, silver medalist(s)	Kindai University
3rd place, bronze medalist(s)	Cignal Super Spikers
4	Savouge Spin Doctors
5	University of Santo Tomas–Gameville
6	ProVolley Academy
7	Alpha Insurance Protectors
8	Far Eastern University–DN Steel
9	VNS Griffins
10	PGJC-Navy Sea Lions

2025 Spikers' Turf Invitational champions
Criss Cross King Crunchers
First title

Team roster:
Ysay Marasigan (c), Jerico Adajar, Jaron Requinton, Philip Bagalay, Nico Almendras, Kim Malabunga, Jude Garcia, Rex Intal, Adrian Villados, Luca Mamone, Chumason Njigha, Francis Saura, Ish Polvorosa, Marck Espejo, Gian Glorioso, Geuel Asia, John Philip Pepito, Noel Kampton, Manuel Sumanguid III, Edlyn Paul Colinares, Menard Guerrero
Head coach:
Anusorn Bundit

== Awards ==
Award	Player	Team	Ref.
Conference Most Valuable Player	Jude Garcia	Criss Cross	
Finals Most Valuable Player	Adrian Villados	Criss Cross	
1st Best Outside Spiker	Jude Garcia	Criss Cross	
2nd Best Outside Spiker	Joshua Umandal	Cignal	
1st Best Middle Blocker	Giles Jeffer Torres	Savouge	
2nd Best Middle Blocker	Edlyn Paul Colinares	Criss Cross	
Best Opposite Spiker	Ryutaro Aun	Kindai University	
Best Setter	Adrian Villados	Criss Cross	
Best Libero	Yuito Kose	Kindai University	

== STPC player of the week ==
Week	Player	Team	Ref.
October 27–November 2	Adrian Villados	Criss Cross King Crunchers	
November 5–7	Josh Ybañez	University of Santo Tomas–Gameville	
November 12–16	Jude Garcia	Criss Cross King Crunchers	
November 21–22	Haruka Misugi	Kindai University	
November 24–27	Jude Garcia	Criss Cross King Crunchers	

== See also ==
- 2025 Premier Volleyball League Reinforced Conference
