= Kim Malabunga =

Filipino volleyball player

Personal information
- Full name: Kim Niño Malabunga
- Nationality: Filipino
- Born: May 8, 1996 (age 30) Quezon, Philippines
- Education: National University
- Height: 1.93 m (6 ft 4 in)
- Weight: 90 kg (198 lb)

Volleyball information
- Position: Middle Blocker
- Current club: Criss Cross King Crunchers
- Number: 4

Career
- Years: Team
- 2017: Philippine Air Force
- 2017: Megabuilders Volley Bolts
- 2018: Vice Co. Blockbusters
- 2019–2021: Philippine Air Force
- 2022: VNS
- 2022: AMC Cotabato Spikers
- 2023: Imus City–AJAA Spikers
- 2024–present: Criss Cross King Crunchers

National team
- Years: Team
- 2019–present: Philippines
Honours
Men's volleyball
Representing Philippines
Southeast Asian Games
Silver medal – second place	2019 Manila	Team
SEA V.League
Bronze medal – third place	2024 Manila	Team
Bronze medal – third place	2024 Yogyakarta	Team

Kim Niño Malabunga (born May 8, 1996) is a Filipino volleyball athlete. He played with NU Bulldogs collegiate men's University team. He is currently playing for the Criss Cross King Crunchers in the Spikers' Turf.

== Early life ==
Kim Malabunga was born on May 8, 1996 in Quezon.

== Career ==
=== Collegiate ===
Malabunga play as the middle blocker for the Bulldogs of the National University in the University Athletic Association of the Philippines.

He played his last playing year with Bulldogs in UAAP Season 81 in 2019, where they won their second consecutive championship title against the FEU Tamaraws in the Finals.

=== Club ===
==== Megabuilders Volley Bolts ====
Malabunga played for the Megabuilders Volley Bolts in the 2017 Premier Volleyball League Reinforced Conference. He was named Best Middle Blocker for the tournament.

==== Philippine Air Force ====
Malabunga has been with the Philippine Air Force of the Spikers' Turf as early as the 2019 Reinforced Conference He later played for Air Force in the 2021 PNVF Champions League.

==== VNS ====
Malabunga played for the VNS Griffins of the Spikers' Turf in 2022.

==== AMC Cotabato ====
The AMC Cotabato Spikers acquired the services of Malabunga for the 2022 PNVF Champions League.

==== Imus AJAA Spikers ====
Malabunga returned to the Spikers' Turf suiting up for the Imus City–AJAA Spikers in the 2023 Open Conference.

==== Criss Cross King Crunchers ====
In early 2024, Malabunga changed his Spikers' Turf club moving to the Criss Cross King Crunchers in the lead up to the 2024 Open Conference.

He got injured in the 2024 Invitational Conference in October. He has recovered by the semifinals of the 2025 Open Conference.

Malabanga helped Criss Cross win two consecutive titles. The latest being the 2026 Open Conference title.

=== National team ===
Malabunga has played for the Philippine national team. He was part of the team which won the silver medal at the 2019 SEA Games hosted in the Philippines.

At the first leg of the 2024 SEA Men's V.League, Malabunga was named as the tournament's second best middle blocker.

Malabunga was part of the host country's team at the 2025 FIVB Men's Volleyball World Championship. A noted part of his national career was the near win against Iran in the last group stage game where he appeared to make a crucial block. It was contested by Iran and later judged to be a net touch. The Philippines lost the match and failed to secure a historic Round of 16 appearance.

== Clubs ==
- (Philippines) Philippine Air Force Air Spikers (2017, 2019–2021)
- (Philippines) Megabuilders Volley Bolts (2017)
- (Philippines) Vice Co. Blockbusters (2018)
- (Philippines) VNS-One Alicia Griffins (2022)
- (Philippines) AMC Cotabato Spikers (2022)
- (Philippines) Imus City–AJAA Spikers (2023)
- (Philippines) Criss Cross King Crunchers (2024–present)

== Awards ==
=== Individual ===
Year	League	Season/Conference	Award	Ref
2015	Spikers' Turf	Collegiate	1st Best Middle Blocker	
2016	Spikers' Turf	Collegiate	2nd Best Middle Blocker	
2017	PVL	Open	1st Best Middle Blocker	
2017	PVL	Collegiate	2nd Best Middle Blocker	
2019	Spikers' Turf	Reinforced	2nd Best Middle Blocker	
2022	PNVF	Champions League	2nd Best Middle Blocker	
2024	SEA V.League	1st Leg	2nd Best Middle Blocker	

=== Collegiate ===
Year	League	Season/Conference	Title	Ref
2015	Spikers' Turf	Collegiate	Runner-up	
2016	UAAP	78	Runner-up	
2016	Spikers' Turf	Collegiate	Runner-up	
2017	UAAP	79	Runner-up	
2018	UAAP	80	Champions	
2018	PVL	Collegiate	Champions	
2019	UAAP	81	Champions	

=== Clubs ===
Year	League	Season/Conference	Club	Title	Ref
2017	PVL	Reinforced	Philippine Air Force Air Spikers	Runner-up	
2017	PVL	Open	Megabuilders Volley Bolts	Runner-up	
2018	Spikers' Turf	Open	Vice Co. Blockbusters	3rd place	
2019	Spikers' Turf	Open	Philippine Air Force Air Spikers	Runner-up	
2021	PNVF	Champions League	Go for Gold-Air Force Aguilas	Runner-up	
2022	PNVF	Champions League	Pikit-North Cotabato G-Spikers	Runner-up	
2023	Spikers' Turf	Open	Imus City–AJAA Spikers	3rd place	
2024	Spikers' Turf	Open	Criss Cross King Crunchers	Runner-up	
2024	Spikers' Turf	Invitational	Criss Cross King Crunchers	Runner-up	
2025	Spikers' Turf	Open	Criss Cross King Crunchers	Runner-up	
