= Alpha Insurance Protectors =

- Short name: Alpha Insurance
- Nickname: Protectors
- Founded: 2025
- Head coach: Mike Santos
- Captain: Jefferson Abuniawan
- League: Spikers' Turf
- 2026 Invitational: 7th place

The Alpha Insurance Protectors is a men's volleyball team playing in the Spikers' Turf. It is associated with the Alpha Insurance & Surety Company .

== History ==
Alpha Insurance Protectors are to make their debut at the 2025 Open Conference of the Spikers' Turf. The team formed from recently graduated collegiate players is coached by Mike Santos. They finished fifth in their inaugural tournament and missed the semifinals.

== Current roster ==
Alpha Insurance Protectors
Number	Player	Position	School
1	Vince Virrey Himzon	Middle Blocker	Letran
3	Billie Anima	Middle Blocker	DLSU
4	Jhon Maru Takeda	Libero	AdU
6	John Michael Apolinario	Setter	UE
7	Jayjay Javelona	Opposite Hitter	FEU
8	Reymond Sabanal	Middle Blocker	FEU
9	Rocky Roy Motol	Outside Hitter	Benilde
10	Francis Casas	Opposite Hitter	AdU
11	Edward Camposano	Outside Hitter	NU
12	Jerome Lopez	Setter	San Beda
14	Dencel John Lacerna	Outside Hitter	AdU
15	Neil Manato	Libero	AdU
16	Jefferson Abuniawan (C)	Middle Blocker	FEU
18	Rommelito Baptista	Outside Hitter	AdU
21	Ranz Wesley Cajolo	Opposite Hitter	UP
24	John Benedict San Andres	Outside Hitter	Mapúa
25	Vincent Nadera	Opposite Hitter	FEU

- Head coach: Mike Santos
- Assistant coach: Arnold Laniog

== Honors ==
=== Team ===
Spikers' Turf:

Season	Conference	Title	Source
2024–25	Open	5th place	
2025–26	Invitational	7th place	
2025–26	Open	4th place	
2026–27	Invitational	7th place	

== Team captains ==
- (Philippines) Edward Camposano (2025)
- (Philippines) Jefferson Abuniawan (2025–present)

== Coaches ==
- (Philippines) Mike Santos (2025–present)
