= Tai Bundit =

Thai volleyball coach

Personal information
- Full name: Anusorn Bundit
- Nickname: Tai
- Nationality: Thailand

Coaching information
- Current team: Criss Cross King Crunchers; Philippines (women)
Previous teams coached
Years	Teams
2014–2018; 2017–2021; 2022–2023; 2024– 2026–	Ateneo de Manila University (women); Creamline Cool Smashers; Nakhon Ratchasima (men and women); Criss Cross King Crunchers; Philippines (women)

Volleyball information
- Position: Head coach

Anusorn "Tai" Bundit (Thai: อนุสร บัณฑิตย์) is a Thai volleyball coach.

== Career ==
=== Early years ===
Bundit who became known affectionally as Coach Tai in the Philippines, has coached in his home country of Thailand. He was coach of the country's B national team and a professional club in the Thai premier league. He was a coach of the Thailand women's national team at the 2006 Asian Games which placed fourth.

=== Ateneo Lady Eagles ===
In 2014, Bundit was tasked by the Ateneo de Manila University in the Philippines to lead its women's team at the UAAP. Despite limited English fluency, he was able to stir the team to win their first ever championship in UAAP Season 76. This was followed by another title in Season 77.

However in October 2017, he was reportedly fired by athletic director Emmanuel Fernandez amidst alleged internal disputes of players not receptive to the coach's strict training. This decision was recinded by the end of the month.

He would coach Ateneo until 2018, last mentoring the team in Season 80.

Bundit became head coach of the Creamline Cool Smashers of the Premier Volleyball League. He helped the team win three PVL titles and two-runner up finishes.

=== Philippine women's national team (assistant) ===
He was named as an assistant coach of the Philippine women's national team under the Philippine National Volleyball Federation (PNVF). Bundit resigned from the national team in August 2021, citing family reasons amidst rising COVID-19 cases in Thailand amidst a pandemic. This also rendered his status with Creamline as uncertain as he returned to Thailand.

=== Hiatus ===
In January 2022, Creamline stated that it is working to bring back Bundit to the Philippines and maintains that he still the team's coach. However, due to the COVID-19 situation in Thailand, Creamline advised Bundit to stay in Thailand. Sherwin Meneses was appointed to lead the team in lieu of Bundit at least for the PVL Open Conference.

=== Nakhon Ratchasima ===
Nakhon Ratchasima announced Bundit as their head coach in November 2022. He led both men's and women's titles at the Volleyball Thailand League in 2023. He returned to the Philippines in 2023 to become a team consultant for Creamline and the Choco Mucho Flying Titans of the PVL.

=== Criss Cross King Crunchers ===
In March 2024, Bundit returned to being a head coach for a Philippine team with the Criss Cross King Crunchers of the men's league Spikers' Turf. He helped the team win its first title in the league by winning the 2025 Invitational Conference.

=== Philippine women's national team ===
In February 2026, Bundit was named as head coach of the Philippine women's national team. However in the lead up to the 2026 AVC Women's Volleyball Nations Cup in Candon, Bundit figured in an scooter accident in Bangkok in May 2026. He underwent a surgery for his ankle injury rendering him unavailable for the Asian tournament. He is expected to return for the 2026 SEA V.League.

== Personal life ==
Bundit is married to Phavinee Romaynond with whom he has children.
