= Lloyd Josafat =

Filipino volleyball player (born 1999)

Personal information
- Full name: Lloyd C. Josafat
- Nationality: Filipino
- Born: September 18, 1999 (age 27)
- Home town: Iba, Zambales
- Education: University of the East
- Height: 188 cm (6 ft 2 in)

Volleyball information
- Position: Middle blocker
- Current club: Criss Cross King Crunchers

Career
- Years: Team
- 2021: Philippine Air Force Air Spikers
- 2022–2023: AMC Cotabato Spikers
- 2024–2025: Cignal HD Spikers
- 2026–present: Criss Cross King Crunchers

National team
- Years: Team
- 2023–present: Philippines

Lloyd C. Josafat (September 18, 1999) is a Filipino volleyball player who last played for Criss Cross King Crunchers of the Spikers' Turf.

== Career ==
=== College ===
Josafat played for the UE Red Warriors in the University Athletic Association of the Philippines (UAAP). He made his UAAP debut in Season 81 in 2019. In Season 82, Josafat was noted to have scored 32 points in UE's five set win against the UP Fighting Maroons. However that season was cancelled due to the COVID-19 pandemic. He continued playing in Season 85 when the men's division was resumed in 2023.

=== Club ===
For the 2021 PNVF Champions League, the Philippine Air Force Air Spikers acquired Josafat. Air Force finished as runners-up to the Team Dasma Monarchs.

He later played for the AMC Cotabato Spikers for the 2022 PNVF Champions League. Cotabato which finished as runners-up in the PNVF competition also played in the Spikers' Turf in 2023.

In January 2024, Josafat moved to Cignal HD Spikers another Spikers' Turf club. He represented the Philippines at the 2025 AVC Men's Volleyball Champions League as a player for Cignal.

=== National team ===
Lloyd Josafat is part of the Philippine national team. He was part of the squad for the 2023 SEA Games, 2023 AVC Men's Challenge Cup, 2022 Asian Games (delayed by a year), 2024 AVC Men's Challenge Cup., and the 2025 SEA Men's V.League.

He is part of the 14-man roster of the Philippines for the 2025 FIVB Men's Volleyball World Championship.
