= Criss Cross King Crunchers =

Men's volleyball team in the Philippines

- Short name: Criss Cross
- Nickname: King Crunchers
- Founded: 2024
- Head coach: Anusorn Bundit
- Captain: Ysrael Wilson Marasigan
- League: Spikers' Turf
- 2026 Open: Champions
- Championships: 2; 2025 Invitational; 2026 Open

The Criss Cross King Crunchers is a men's volleyball team playing in the Spikers' Turf. The team is owned by Rebisco and named after its Criss Cross potato snack brand.

== History ==
The Criss Cross King Crunchers were formed in 2024 as the third team and first men's team owned by Rebisco. The first two teams, namely Creamline Cool Smashers and Choco Mucho Flying Titans, are also owned by the company and both play in the Premier Volleyball League.

During the sponsorship event by the Insurance company Allianz in February 2024, the Rebisco team managers already hinted the new team owned by the company. The team was formally launched on March 1, 2024. Anusorn Bundit was the team's first coach in the Spikers' Turf.

Criss Cross won their first ever Spikers' Turf title at the 2025 Invitational Conference. They won their second consecutive title at the 2026 Open Conference.

== Current roster ==
Criss Cross King Crunchers
No.	Player	Position	Height	Birth date	School
1	Nico Almendras	Outside Hitter	1.90 m (6 ft 3 in)	July 27, 1999 (age 27)	NU
2	Jaron Requinton	Outside Hitter	1.89 m (6 ft 2 in)	July 2, 2000 (age 26)	UST
3	Philip Bagalay	Outside Hitter			MU
4	Kim Malabunga	Middle Blocker	1.98 m (6 ft 6 in)	May 8, 1996 (age 30)	NU
5	Jude Garcia	Opposite Hitter	1.80 m (5 ft 11 in)	November 8, 1998 (age 27)	FEU
6	Menard Guerrero	Libero			DLSU
7	Rex Intal	Middle Blocker	1.91 m (6 ft 3 in)	September 7, 1994 (age 32)	ADMU
8	Ysay Marasigan (C)	Opposite Hitter	1.83 m (6 ft 0 in)	September 24, 1994 (age 32)	ADMU
9	Adrian Villados	Setter			AU
10	Lucca Mamone	Middle Blocker	1.98 m (6 ft 6 in)		LBCC
11	Elijah Kim	Setter	1.85 m (6 ft 1 in)	December 27, 2001 (age 24)	DC
12	Francis Saura	Middle Blocker	1.95 m (6 ft 5 in)	May 2, 1996 (age 30)	NU
16	Gian Glorioso	Middle Blocker	1.94 m (6 ft 4 in)		ADMU
18	John Philip Pepito	Libero			UPHSD
19	Noel Kampton	Outside Hitter	1.88 m (6 ft 2 in)	April 2, 2000 (age 26)	DLSU
20	Lloyd Josafat	Middle Blocker	1.93 m (6 ft 4 in)	April 14, 2000 (age 26)	UE
22	Manuel Sumanguid III	Libero	1.70 m (5 ft 7 in)	January 25, 1998 (age 28)	ADMU
23	Jerico Adajar	Setter	1.85 m (6 ft 1 in)	December 29, 2001 (age 24)	DLSU
24	Paul Colinares	Middle Blocker		September 15, 2001 (age 25)	UST
25	Alche Gupiteo	Outside Hitter		June 2, 2002 (age 24)	UST

Coaching staff
Position	Name
Head Coach	Anusorn Bundit
Assistant Coach 1	Paul Jan Dolorias
Strength and Conditioning Coach	Miggy Samonte
Trainer	Carl Bryan Vitug
Trainer	Romnick Rico
Statistician	Karl Baysa
Physical Therapist	Jonathan Garduque
Team Coordinator	Taj Celda
Team Manager	Lizanne Co

== Season-by-season records ==
Season	Conference	Preliminary round	Knockout rounds	Ranking	Source
2024–25	2024 Open	2nd (7–1, 22 pts)	Finished 2nd in semifinals (2–1, 5 pts); Lost in finals series vs. Cignal, 0–2	Runner-up	
2024–25	Invitational	1st (8–1, 25 pts)	Finished 1st in semifinals (4–0, 12 pts); Lost in finals match vs. Cignal, 0–3	Runner-up	
2024–25	2025 Open	1st (10–0, 28 pts)	Finished 1st in semifinals (3–0, 9 pts); Lost in finals series vs. Cignal, 1–2	Runner-up	
2025–26	Invitational	1st (7–0, 20 pts)	Finished 2nd in semifinals (4–1, 10 pts); Won in finals match vs. Kindai, 3–2	Champions	
2025–26	Open	1st (10–0, 30 pts)	Finished 2nd in semifinals (2–1, 7 pts); Won in finals series vs. Savouge, 2–1	Champions	

== Individual awards ==
Season	Conference	Award	Name	Source
2024–25	2024 Open	Most Valuable Player (Conference)	Jude Garcia	
2024–25	Invitational	Most Valuable Player (Conference)	Jude Garcia	
2024–25	Invitational	1st Best Outside Spiker	Nico Almendras	
2024–25	Invitational	1st Best Middle Blocker	Gian Glorioso	
2024–25	Invitational	Best Setter	Ish Polvorosa	
2024–25	2025 Open	Most Valuable Player (Conference)	Jude Garcia	
2024–25	2025 Open	2nd Best Middle Blocker	Gian Glorioso	
2024–25	2025 Open	Best Setter	Ish Polvorosa	
2025–26	Invitational	Most Valuable Player (Conference)	Jude Garcia	
2025–26	Invitational	1st Best Outside Spiker	Jude Garcia	
2025–26	Invitational	Most Valuable Player (Finals)	Adrian Villados	
2025–26	Invitational	Best Setter	Adrian Villados	
2025–26	Invitational	2nd Best Middle Blocker	Paul Colinares	
2025–26	Open	Most Valuable Player (Conference)	Jude Garcia	
2025–26	Open	Most Valuable Player (Finals)	Jude Garcia	
2025–26	Open	Best Opposite Spiker	Jude Garcia	
2025–26	Open	1st Best Outside Spiker	Alche Gupiteo	
2025–26	Open	2nd Best Middle Blocker	Lloyd Josafat	
2025–26	Open	Best Setter	Adrian Villados	

== Team captains ==
- (Philippines) Ysay Marasigan (2024–present)

== Coaches ==
- (Thailand) Anusorn Bundit (2024–present)
