= Chumason Njigha =

Filipino volleyball player (born 1998)

Chu Njigha

Personal information
- Full name: Chumason Celestine Njigha
- Nickname: Chumason
- Nationality: Filipino
- Born: December 5, 1998 (age 27)
- Height: 1.95 m (6 ft 5 in)
- Education: Ateneo de Manila University

Volleyball information
- Position: Middle Blocker
- Current club: Cignal HD Spikers
- Number: 12

Career
Years	Teams
2022–2023	Cignal HD Spikers
2024–present	Criss Cross King Crunchers

Chumason Celestine Njigha is a Filipino volleyball player. He played with Ateneo Blue Eagles collegiate men's University team. He is currently playing for the Criss Cross King Crunchers in the Spikers' Turf.

== Career ==
=== Collegiate ===
Njigha made his first game appearance with the Ateneo Blue Eagles in the UAAP Season 79 where they won their 3 peat championship in the UAAP.

In UAAP Season 80, they failed to defend their fourth championship title after being defeated by NU Bulldogs in the Finals.

In UAAP Season 81, they failed to advance in the finals after being defeated by FEU Tamaraws in the semis.

== Clubs ==
- (Philippines) Cignal HD Spikers (2022–2023)
- (Philippines) Criss Cross King Crunchers (2024–present)

== Awards ==
=== Individual ===
Year	League	Season/Conference	Award	Ref
2017	UAAP	79	Rookie of the Year	
2019	UAAP	81	2nd Best Middle Blocker	

=== Collegiate ===
Year	League	Season/Conference	Title	Ref
2017	PVL	Collegiate	Champions	
2017	UAAP	79	Champions	
2018	UAAP	80	Runner-up	
2019	UAAP	81	3rd place	

=== Clubs ===
Year	League	Season/Conference	Club	Title	Ref
2022	Spikers' Turf	Open	Cignal HD Spikers	Runner-up	
2022	PNVF	Champions League	Cignal HD Spikers	Champions	
2023	Spikers' Turf	Open	Cignal HD Spikers	Champions	
2023	Spikers' Turf	Invitational	Cignal HD Spikers	Runner-up	
2024	Spikers' Turf	Open	Criss Cross King Crunchers	Runner-up	
2024	Spikers' Turf	Invitational	Criss Cross King Crunchers	Runner-up	
2025	Spikers' Turf	Open	Criss Cross King Crunchers	Runner-up	
