= 2024 Spikers' Turf Invitational Conference =

Last Conference of the 2024 SPT season

- Duration: October 16 – December 15, 2024
- Matches: 57
- Teams: 11
- Attendance: 17,823 (313 per match)
- TV partner(s): One Sports; One Sports+ Pilipinas Live

Results
- Champions: Cignal HD Spikers
- Runners-up: Criss Cross King Crunchers
- Third place: Savouge Spin Doctors
- Fourth place: DN Steel–FEU Tamaraws

Awards
- Conference MVP: Jude Garcia
- Finals MVP: Louie Ramirez
- Best OH: Nico Almendras; Sherwin Caritativo
- Best MB: Gian Glorioso; Giles Torres
- Best OPP: Zhydryx Saavedra
- Best Setter: Ish Polvorosa
- Best Libero: Vince Lorenzo

Spikers' Turf Invitational Conference chronology
- < 2023 2025 >

Spikers' Turf conference chronology
- < 2024 Open 2025 Open >

The 2024 Spikers' Turf Invitational Conference was the second conference of the 2024–25 season of Spikers' Turf.

A total of eleven teams are battling for the championship title. This includes guest team, KondohGumi Hyogo of Japan, will join the semifinals round-robin phase.

The Cignal HD Spikers claimed its sixth title in the league and its first Invitational championship gold by defeating Criss Cross King Crunchers in three sets. Meanwhile, Savouge Spin Doctors won against DN Steel-FEU Ultras to win the bronze medal of the tournament, which marks their first podium finish of the team since joining the league. Jude Garcia of the King Crunchers bagged his second straight Conference MVP, and Louie Ramirez of the HD Spikers shined at the championship match that earned him the Finals MVP award.

== Qualification ==
Eleven teams participated in this conference, with eight of the nine teams who competed in the 2024 Spikers' Turf Open Conference.

The FEU Tamaraws (under the name DN Steel-FEU Ultras) and the De La Salle Green Spikers (under the name EcoOil-La Salle Green Oilers) are qualified to join the tournament after being the finalists of the recently concluded 2024 V-League Collegiate Challenge.

KondohGumi Hyogo, once known as "Maruichi Hyogo" returned as the sole foreign guest team who joined the semifinalists of the conference.

Qualification method	Date	Berths	Qualifier(s)
2024 Spikers' Turf Open Conference teams	October 10, 2024 (announced)	~~9~~; 8	Cignal HD Spikers
2024 Spikers' Turf Open Conference teams	October 10, 2024 (announced)	~~9~~; 8	Criss Cross King Crunchers
2024 Spikers' Turf Open Conference teams	October 10, 2024 (announced)	~~9~~; 8	PGJC-Navy Sea Lions
2024 Spikers' Turf Open Conference teams	October 10, 2024 (announced)	~~9~~; 8	D' Navigators Iloilo
2024 Spikers' Turf Open Conference teams	October 10, 2024 (announced)	~~9~~; 8	Savouge Spin Doctors
2024 Spikers' Turf Open Conference teams	October 10, 2024 (announced)	~~9~~; 8	VNS Griffins
2024 Spikers' Turf Open Conference teams	October 10, 2024 (announced)	~~9~~; 8	Martelli Meats Master Butchers
2024 Spikers' Turf Open Conference teams	October 10, 2024 (announced)	~~9~~; 8	~~Philippine Air Force Airmen~~ (did not join)
2024 Spikers' Turf Open Conference teams	October 10, 2024 (announced)	~~9~~; 8	Chichi DHTSI Braderhood Titans
2024 V-League Collegiate Challenge finalists	September 18–25, 2024 (Semifinals)	2	DN Steel-FEU Ultras
2024 V-League Collegiate Challenge finalists	September 18–25, 2024 (Semifinals)	2	EcoOil-La Salle Green Oilers
Foreign guest team	December 2, 2024 (announced)	1	KondohGumi Hyogo

== Participating teams ==
2024 Spikers' Turf Invitational Conference
Abbr.	Team	Affiliation	Head coach	Team captain
Local teams
CBT	Chichi DHTSI Braderhood Titans	Digital Hybrid Transport Systems / Chi Chi Drinks PH	(Philippines) Roberto Javier	(Philippines) Jonathan Sorio
CHD	Cignal HD Spikers	Cignal TV, Inc.	(Philippines) Dexter Clamor	(Philippines) John Paul Bugaoan
CKC	Criss Cross King Crunchers	Republic Biscuit Corporation	(Thailand) Tai Bundit	(Philippines) Ysay Marasigan
DNV	D' Navigators Iloilo	Iloilo City	(Philippines) Boyet Delmoro	(Philippines) John Michael Apolinario
FEU	DN Steel-FEU Ultras	DN Steel Group of Companies / Far Eastern University	(Philippines) Eddieson Orcullo	(Philippines) Jelord Talisayan
DLSU	EcoOil-La Salle Green Oilers	Eco Oil Ltd. / De La Salle University	(Philippines) Jose Roque	(Philippines) Menard Guerrero
MMB	Martelli Meats Master Butchers	Maverick Sports Team	(Philippines) Michael Conde	(Philippines) Jerome Michael Cordez
PJN	PGJC-Navy Sea Lions	Philippine Navy	(Philippines) George Pascua	(Philippines) Greg Dolor
SVG	Savouge Spin Doctors	Savouge Aesthetics Philippines	(Philippines) Sydney Calderon	(Philippines) Hero Austria
VNS	VNS Griffins	VNS Management Group	(Philippines) Ralph Raymund Ocampo	(Philippines) Charles Jordan Segui
Foreign guest team
KON	KondohGumi Hyogo	Kondogumi Co. Ltd. / Hyogo Prefectural University Volleyball Association	(Japan) Kota Kunichika	(Japan) Kakiuchi Kohsuke

== Venues ==
The following are the game venues set for this conference:

Preliminaries
Santa Rosa, Laguna	Antipolo
Santa Rosa Sports Complex	Ynares Center
Capacity: 5,700	Capacity: 7,400
Preliminaries, Semifinals, Finals
San Juan, Metro Manila	Pasig
Filoil EcoOil Centre	PhilSports Arena
Capacity: 6,000	Capacity: 10,000

== Rosters ==
Chichi DHTSI Braderhood Titans
No.	Name	Position
1	CRISOLOGO, Bernie	OP
2	REYES, Jomari	MB
3	MIGUEL, Matthew	OP
4	MOSERA, Gianpaolo John	S
5	SORIO, Jonathan (c)	OH
6	FRIAS, Marc Julius	L
7	DENIEGA, Ferdinand	S
8	DELA CRUZ, Mike Angelo	OH
9	ABRAZADO, Glen Rey	OP
10	ROLDAN, Barrie	S
11	LOPEZ, Rene	OH
12	YORONG, Jufranch	OH
13	ALICANTE, Christian	OH
14	MARIÑAS, Quirt Lorenz	MB
16	DEL PILAR, Rafael	MB
17	LORIEGA, Jhon Clifford	OP
18	SALAZAR, Hernan	MB
19	LIM, John Mark	MB
25	DELA CRUZ, Dan Carlo	L
	Roberto Javier	HC

Cignal HD Spikers
No.	Name	Position
1	MONTERO, Sandy Domenick	L
2	VALBUENA, Alfred Gerald	OP
3	RETAMAR, Joshua	S
4	ROTTER, Steven	OP
6	CALADO, Mark Frederick	OH
7	LORENZO, Vince	L
8	BUGAOAN, John Paul (c)	MB
10	MIGUEL, Wendel Concepcion	OH
11	UMANDAL, Joshua	OH
13	GWAZA, Mfena	MB
14	ABROT, Ruvince	OH
15	BUGAOAN, Martin	MB
17	RONQUILLO, John Mark	OH
18	CASAÑA, Gabriel EJ	S
19	SILANG, Kris Cian	S
20	JOSAFAT, Lloyd	MB
21	RAMIREZ, Louie	OH
	Dexter Clamor	HC

Criss Cross King Crunchers
No.	Name	Position
1	ALMENDRAS, Angelo Nicolas	OH
2	REQUINTON, Jaron	OH
3	BAGALAY, Philip Michael	OH
4	MALABUNGA, Kim	MB
5	GARCIA, Jude	OH
6	ARBASTO, Anthony Lemuel Jr.	OH
7	INTAL, Rex Emmanuel	MB
8	MARASIGAN, Ysrael Wilson (c)	OP
9	VILLADOS, Adrian	S
10	MAMONE, Lucca	MB
11	SAURA, Francis Philip	OP
12	NJIGHA, Chumason Celestine	MB
14	POLVOROSA, Esmilzo Joner	S
16	GLORIOSO, Gian Carlo	MB
17	ASIA, GEUEL	S
18	PEPITO, John Philip	L
22	SUMAGUID III, Manuel	L
	Tai Bundit	HC

D' Navigators Iloilo
No.	Name	Position
1	ADAO, Rick	L
2	VILLAMOR, Kyle Angelo	OH
3	DAYANDANTE, Kim Harold	S
4	ARAÑO, John Wayne	S
5	RAMONES, Kyle Adrian	MB
6	APOLINARIO, John Michael (c)	S
7	SUMAGAYSAY, Jayvee	MB
8	PRUDENCIADO, Van Tracy	L
9	ESPANSO, Jhonmark	L
10	STA. MARIA, Steven	OP
11	CAMPOSANO, Edward	OH
12	LOPEZ, Jerome	S
13	SAN ANDRES, John Benedict	OH
14	NURSIDDIK, Rash	MB
15	JALECO, Bryan James	OH
16	ALICANDO, Geffrey	MB
17	TAKEDA, Jhon Maru	U
18	GAMPONG, Madzlan Allian	OP
20	SABANDO, Kent	OH
25	HIMZON, Vince Virrey	MB
	Boyet Delmoro	HC

DN Steel - FEU Ultras
No.	Name	Position
1	CEBALLOS, Vennie Paul	L
2	CODILLA, Jomel	OH
3	CACAO, Ariel	S
4	DE GUZMAN, Raymond Bryce	L
5	ESPARTERO, Mikko	OH
6	TANDOC, Kyle Clarence	OH
7	PANGILINAN, Keith Jhustine	MB
8	TALISAYAN, Jelord (c)	OH
9	SAAVEDRA, Zhydryx	OP
11	MENDOZA, Lirick John	MB
12	CELAJES, Jacob	L
13	CASTILLO, Mezekiel Josh	L
14	DU-OT, Rhodson	S
15	NDONGALA, Doula	MB
17	MARTINEZ, Benny	S
19	BITUIN, Amet	OH
22	ABSIN, Charles David	MB
23	MOLINA, Vir Angelo	MB
24	GARRIEDO, Judi Laurence	MB
25	MIGUEL, Luis Michael	OP
	Eddieson Orcullo	HC

EcoOil - La Salle Green Oilers
No.	Name	Position
1	MENDOZA, Uriel	OH
2	GUERRERO, Menard (c)	L
4	MAGALLANES, Arjay	OH
5	ADAJAR, Jerico	S
6	RETIRO, Sherwin	L
7	LAYUG, Eric Paolo	MB
8	POQUITA, Diogenes	S
9	KAMPTON, Michael Noel	OH
11	GLORIA, Eugene	OH
12	FORTUNA, Michael John	OP
13	DEL PILAR, Nathaniel	MB
14	FLORES, Neil Laurence	L
15	MAGALAMAN, Joshua	MB
16	DE CASTRO, Jonathan	L
17	MAGLINAO, Vince Gerard	OH
18	HERNANDEZ, Chris Emmanuel	OH
19	FLORES, Robert	L
20	VENTURA, Glen Rui	OP
22	RODRIGUEZ, Joshua Jamiel	MB
25	FALSIS, Andraie Jara	OH
	Jose Monsol Roque	HC

KondohGumi Hyogo
No.	Name	Position
1	KOHSUKE, Kakiuchi (c)	MB
2	HARUTO, Shiozaki	OH
3	KOMA, Nakamura	OP
4	RYOMA, Kakimoto	OH
5	SOTA, Matsushita	MB
6	KYOSHIRO, Yamamoto	S
7	TAICHI, Hiramatsu	L
8	TAISHIN, Sato	MB
9	SHINNOSUKE, Muneta	S
10	RIKU, Norihisa	OP
11	TAKAYA, Akamatsu	MB
12	SOTA, Akehi	OH
13	HARUMA, Taniguchi	L
14	SEISHIRO, Nakata	OH
15	KAITO, Onomichi	OP
	Kota Kunichika	HC

Martelli Meats Master Butchers
No.	Name	Position
1	CORDEZ, Jerome Michael (c)	OH
2	HONRADO, Karl Justin	OP
3	BUNDOC, Andrei Miguel	OH
4	CRUZ, Renz Jonas	MB
5	CALAYAG, Lorenz	MB
6	UMALI, Kenrod Benedict	OH
8	ALFARO, Ricardo	L
9	SUNDIANG, Stephen Jason	L
11	PALISOC, Razzel	OP
12	CEBRERO, Wilbert	S
14	ISIDRO, Carlo	L
15	TUBOG, Joaquin Clemen	S
17	SEQUITIN, Jay	MB
18	REYES, Angelo	MB
22	TEODONES, Romeo	OH
23	RACAZA, France Lander	OH
	Michael Conde	HC

PGJC Navy Sea Lions
No.	Name	Position
1	VILLANUEVA, Marvin	OP
2	PAGULONG, Alfred	L
3	DAGOOC, Lancelot	MB
4	JACOB, John Ashley	OH
6	JASMIN, Nilo	MB
7	LAPURGA, Melver	MB
9	PUDADERA, Louie	S
10	SANTOS, Jeremy	L
11	LIOC, Omar	MB
13	KALINGKING, Jack	L
14	HAIRAMI, Marvin	S
15	QUIEL, Peter	MB
16	DOLOR, Gregorio (c)	OH
17	SAPIDA, Wilbert Jasyon	MB
18	DELA VEGA, Joeven	OP
19	CARANGUIAN, Jeric	OH
	George Pascua	HC

Savouge Spin Doctors
No.	Name	Position
1	CARITATIVO, Sherwin Jan	OH
2	SEÑORON, Jhun Lorenz	OP
3	MAGPAYO, Charlee	MB
4	TORRES, Giles Jeffer	MB
5	MARMETO, Rikko Marius	L
6	PAGLAON, John Michael	S
7	ENON, Jack	L
8	PEDROSA, Jeremy	OP
9	ANTONIO, Renzel	OH
10	SANAMA, Norwel	OH
11	ENARCISO, John Christian	S
12	DIONES, Bhim Lawrence	L
13	IMPERIAL, Michael Vince	S
14	ROMERO, Marvin Williams	OH
15	HERNANDEZ, John Kenneth	S
17	DE PEDRO, Deanne Neil	OP
18	GAMBAN, Louis Gaspar	OH
19	DIWA, John Daniel	MB
21	AMILBAHAR, Al-Nasim	OP
24	Austra, Hero (c)	OH
	Sydney Calderon	HC

VNS Griffins
No.	Name	Position
1	LIRAY, Kim Chris	OH
2	CRUZ, Joshua	L
3	MANGULABNAN, Jan	S
5	MEDINO, RODERICK	OP
7	YATCO, Justin	S
8	SEGUI, Charles Jordan (c)	OH
9	GUERRA, Howard	S
10	FLORES, Jimmar	L
12	MARTICION, Terrence	OH
13	ARCILLO, Julius Jao	MB
14	ALFORQUE, Paul	MB
15	LABIDE, Benjaylo	OH
17	DAYNATA, Kenneth	S
18	VILLACRUSIS, Titus	MB
19	OLAES, Christhian	MB
	Ralph Ocampo	HC

== Format ==
Preliminary round

1. Single round-robin elimination; Ten (10) teams.
2. Teams are ranked using the FIVB Ranking System.
3. The top 4 teams in the pool will advance to the semifinals.

Semifinals

1. Five teams (4 semifinalists + foreign guest team); Single round-robin elimination.
2. Teams are ranked using the FIVB Ranking System.
3. The 3rd and 4th ranked teams will advance to the bronze medal match.
4. The 1st and 2nd ranked teams will advance to the winner-take-all gold medal match.

Finals

1. All games are knockout matches.
2. Bronze medal: 3rd ranked team vs. 4th ranked team
3. Gold medal: 1st ranked team vs. 2nd ranked team

== Pool standing procedure ==
- First, teams are ranked by the number of matches won.
- If the number of matches won is tied, the tied teams are then ranked by match points, wherein:
  - Match won 3–0 or 3–1: 3 match points for the winner, 0 match points for the loser.
  - Match won 3–2: 2 match points for the winner, 1 match point for the loser.
- In case of any further ties, the following criteria shall be used:
  - Set ratio: the number of sets won divided by number of sets lost.
  - Point ratio: the number of points scored divided by the number of points allowed.
  - Head-to-head standings: any remaining tied teams are ranked based on the results of head-to-head matches involving the teams in question.

== Preliminary round ==
- All times are Philippine Standard Time (UTC+08:00).

=== Ranking ===
Pos	Team	Pld	W	L	Pts	SW	SL	SR	SPW	SPL	SPR	Qualification
1	Criss Cross King Crunchers	9	8	1	25	26	4	6.500	727	536	1.356	Final round
2	Cignal HD Spikers	9	8	1	24	26	6	4.333	770	607	1.269	Final round
3	DN Steel-FEU Ultras	9	7	2	19	23	13	1.769	823	776	1.061	Final round
4	Savouge Spin Doctors	9	6	3	17	21	13	1.615	783	701	1.117	Final round
5	EcoOil-La Salle Green Oilers	9	5	4	15	15	13	1.154	633	610	1.038	
6	PGJC-Navy Sea Lions	9	5	4	15	16	14	1.143	691	654	1.057	
7	VNS Griffins	9	3	6	10	11	19	0.579	612	697	0.878	
8	D' Navigators Iloilo	9	2	7	5	9	23	0.391	668	720	0.928	
9	Martelli Meats Master Butchers	9	1	8	4	6	24	0.250	535	713	0.750	
10	Chichi DHTSI Braderhood Titans	9	0	9	1	3	27	0.111	502	730	0.688	

Source: Spikers' Turf – Standings

=== Match results ===
Date	Time	Venue		Score		Set 1	Set 2	Set 3	Set 4	Set 5	Total	Report
Oct 16	14:00	YSA	Chichi DHTSI Braderhood Titans	2–3	D' Navigators Iloilo	25–21	16–25	17–25	25–17	6–15	89–103	P2
Oct 16	16:00	YSA	VNS Griffins	0–3	Criss Cross King Crunchers	14–25	15–25	15–25			44–75	P2
Oct 18	14:00	YSA	Savouge Spin Doctors	3–2	Martelli Meats Master Butchers	23–25	25–17	25–12	22–25	15–8	110–87	P2
Oct 18	16:00	YSA	DN Steel-FEU Ultras	3–1	Chichi DHTSI Braderhood Titans	25–16	25–22	25–27	25–19		100–84	P2
Oct 20	16:00	YSA	Martelli Meats Master Butchers	0–3	VNS Griffins	21–25	17–25	27–29			65–79	P2
Oct 20	18:00	YSA	D' Navigators Iloilo	1–3	DN Steel-FEU Ultras	18–25	25–16	22–25	20–25		85–91	P2
Oct 22	16:00	SRC	VNS Griffins	0–3	Savouge Spin Doctors	16–25	23–25	16–25			55–75	P2
Oct 22	18:00	SRC	Cignal HD Spikers	3–0	Chichi DHTSI Braderhood Titans	25–16	25–16	25–15			75–47	P2
Oct 25	16:00	YSA	Chichi DHTSI Braderhood Titans	0–3	PGJC-Navy Sea Lions	20–25	17–25	15–25			52–75	P2
Oct 25	18:00	YSA	Savouge Spin Doctors	3–2	Cignal HD Spikers	19–25	27–25	19–25	25–23	15–13	105–111	P2
Oct 27	14:00	YSA	Martelli Meats Master Butchers	0–3	EcoOil-La Salle Green Oilers	21–25	20–25	13–25			54–75	P2
Oct 27	16:00	YSA	PGJC-Navy Sea Lions	0–3	DN Steel-FEU Ultras	19–25	27–29	23–25			69–79	P2
Oct 27	18:00	YSA	Criss Cross King Crunchers	3–0	D' Navigators Iloilo	25–18	25–14	25–16			75–48	P2
Oct 30	16:00	YSA	Cignal HD Spikers	3–0	Martelli Meats Master Butchers	25–10	25–15	25–12			75–37	P2
Oct 30	18:00	YSA	D' Navigators Iloilo	1–3	PGJC-Navy Sea Lions	20–25	18–25	25–19	19–25		82–94	P2
Nov 03	14:00	PSA	EcoOil-La Salle Green Oilers	3–0	Chichi DHTSI Braderhood Titans	25–18	25–6	25–20			75–44	P2
Nov 03	16:00	PSA	DN Steel-FEU Ultras	3–2	VNS Griffins	23–25	23–25	25–19	25–20	15–10	111–99	P2
Nov 03	18:00	PSA	Criss Cross King Crunchers	2–3	Cignal HD Spikers	21–25	21–25	27–25	25–18	11–15	105–108	P2
Nov 06	16:00	PSA	Chichi DHTSI Braderhood Titans	0–3	Savouge Spin Doctors	13–25	13–25	14–25			40–75	P2
Nov 06	18:00	PSA	VNS Griffins	0–3	PGJC-Navy Sea Lions	20–25	18–25	20–25			58–75	P2
Nov 08	14:00	YSA	D' Navigators Iloilo	0–3	EcoOil-La Salle Green Oilers	21–25	20–25	20–25			61–75	P2
Nov 08	16:00	SRC	Criss Cross King Crunchers	3–0	PGJC-Navy Sea Lions	25–17	25–18	25–22			75–57	P2
Nov 08	18:00	YSA	Martelli Meats Master Butchers	1–3	DN Steel-FEU Ultras	20–25	25–16	16–25	15–25		76–91	P2
Nov 10	14:00	PSA	DN Steel-FEU Ultras	3–2	Savouge Spin Doctors	25–20	25–22	19–25	17–25	16–14	102–106	P2
Nov 10	16:00	PSA	EcoOil-La Salle Green Oilers	3–1	PGJC-Navy Sea Lions	22–25	25–21	25–19	25–23		97–88	P2
Nov 10	18:00	PSA	Cignal HD Spikers	3–0	D' Navigators Iloilo	25–16	25–23	26–24			76–63	P2
Nov 13	16:00	YSA	Chichi DHTSI Braderhood Titans	0–3	VNS Griffins	16–25	25–27	20–25			61–77	P2
Nov 13	18:00	YSA	Criss Cross King Crunchers	3–0	Martelli Meats Master Butchers	25–9	25–19	25–16			75–44	P2
Nov 15	16:00	YSA	PGJC-Navy Sea Lions	3–1	Savouge Spin Doctors	25–23	22–25	25–20	25–22		97–90	P2
Nov 15	18:00	YSA	EcoOil-La Salle Green Oilers	0–3	Cignal HD Spikers	21–25	12–25	19–25			52–75	P2
Nov 17	14:00	YSA	Martelli Meats Master Butchers	3–0	Chichi DHTSI Braderhood Titans	25–19	25–20	25–19			75–58	P2
Nov 17	16:00	YSA	VNS Griffins	3–1	D' Navigators Iloilo	25–22	16–25	25–19	25–19		91–85	P2
Nov 17	18:00	YSA	DN Steel-FEU Ultras	1–3	Criss Cross King Crunchers	25–22	20–25	20–25	21–25		86–97	P2
Nov 22	16:00	YSA	EcoOil-La Salle Green Oilers	0–3	DN Steel-FEU Ultras	21–25	16–25	23–25			60–75	P2
Nov 22	18:00	YSA	Cignal HD Spikers	3–0	VNS Griffins	25–16	25–17	25–17			75–50	P2
Nov 24	14:00	PSA	D' Navigators Iloilo	0–3	Savouge Spin Doctors	26–28	21–25	19–25			66–78	P2
Nov 24	16:00	PSA	EcoOil-La Salle Green Oilers	0–3	Criss Cross King Crunchers	21–25	12–25	23–25			56–75	P2
Nov 24	18:00	PSA	DN Steel-FEU Ultras	1–3	Cignal HD Spikers	27–25	21–25	20–25	20–25		88–100	P2
Nov 27	16:00	YSA	Criss Cross King Crunchers	3–0	Chichi DHTSI Braderhood Titans	25–8	25–13	25–7			75–28	P2
Nov 27	18:00	YSA	PGJC-Navy Sea Lions	3–0	Martelli Meats Master Butchers	25–9	25–17	25–20			75–46	P2
Nov 29	16:00	YSA	Cignal HD Spikers	3–0	PGJC-Navy Sea Lions	25–22	25–21	25–18			75–61	P2
Nov 29	18:00	YSA	Savouge Spin Doctors	3–0	EcoOil-La Salle Green Oilers	25–23	29–27	25–18			79–68	P2
Dec 01	14:00	FEC	D' Navigators Iloilo	3–0	Martelli Meats Master Butchers	25–17	25–14	25–20			75–51	P2
Dec 01	16:00	FEC	EcoOil-La Salle Green Oilers	3–0	VNS Griffins	25–19	25–22	25–18			75–59	P2
Dec 01	18:00	FEC	Criss Cross King Crunchers	3–0	Savouge Spin Doctors	25–22	25–21	25–22			75–65	P2

== Final round ==
- All times are Philippine Standard Time (UTC+8:00).

=== Semifinals ===
==== Ranking ====
Pos	Team	Pld	W	L	Pts	SW	SL	SR	SPW	SPL	SPR	Qualification
1	Criss Cross King Crunchers	4	4	0	12	12	2	6.000	346	270	1.281	Championship match
2	Cignal HD Spikers	4	3	1	9	10	3	3.333	306	251	1.219	Championship match
3	Savouge Spin Doctors	4	2	2	6	7	6	1.167	305	298	1.023	3rd place match
4	DN Steel-FEU Ultras	4	1	3	3	3	9	0.333	240	273	0.879	3rd place match
5	KondohGumi Hyogo	4	0	4	0	0	12	0.000	204	309	0.660	

Source: Spikers' Turf – Standings

==== Match results ====
Date	Time	Venue		Score		Set 1	Set 2	Set 3	Set 4	Set 5	Total	Report
Dec 04	16:00	FEC	DN Steel-FEU Ultras	0–3	Criss Cross King Crunchers	21–25	21–25	11–25			53–75	P2
Dec 04	18:00	FEC	Savouge Spin Doctors	0–3	Cignal HD Spikers	21–25	21–25	20–25			62–75	P2
Dec 06	16:00	FEC	Cignal HD Spikers	3–0	DN Steel-FEU Ultras	25–18	25–20	25–16			75–54	P2
Dec 06	18:00	FEC	KondohGumi Hyogo	0–3	Savouge Spin Doctors	16–25	19–25	32–34			67–84	P2
Dec 08	16:00	FEC	DN Steel-FEU Ultras	3–0	KondohGumi Hyogo	25–17	25–13	25–18			75–48	P2
Dec 08	18:00	FEC	Criss Cross King Crunchers	3–1	Cignal HD Spikers	25–20	22–25	25–12	26–24		98–81	P2
Dec 11	16:00	FEC	Savouge Spin Doctors	1–3	Criss Cross King Crunchers	22–25	25–22	24–26	13–25		84–98	P2
Dec 11	18:00	FEC	KondohGumi Hyogo	0–3	Cignal HD Spikers	11–25	8–25	18–25			37–75	P2
Dec 13	16:00	PSA	DN Steel-FEU Ultras	0–3	Savouge Spin Doctors	17–25	22–25	19–25			58–75	P2
Dec 13	18:00	PSA	Criss Cross King Crunchers	3–0	KondohGumi Hyogo	25–18	25–17	25–17			75–52	P2

=== Finals ===
==== 3rd place ====
Date	Time	Venue		Score		Set 1	Set 2	Set 3	Set 4	Set 5	Total	Report
Dec 15	16:00	PSA	Savouge Spin Doctors	3–1	DN Steel-FEU Ultras	25–21	16–25	25–14	25–17		91–77	P2

==== Championship ====
Date	Time	Venue		Score		Set 1	Set 2	Set 3	Set 4	Set 5	Total	Report
Dec 15	18:00	PSA	Cignal HD Spikers	3–0	Criss Cross King Crunchers	25–19	25–19	26–24			76–62	P2

== Final standing ==
Rank	Team
1st place, gold medalist(s)	Cignal HD Spikers
2nd place, silver medalist(s)	Criss Cross King Crunchers
3rd place, bronze medalist(s)	Savouge Spin Doctors
4	DN Steel-FEU Ultras
5	KondohGumi Hyogo
6	EcoOil-La Salle Green Oilers
7	PGJC-Navy Sea Lions
8	VNS Griffins
9	D' Navigators Iloilo
10	Martelli Meats Master Butchers
11	Chichi DHTSI Braderhood Titans

2024 Spikers' Turf Invitational champions
Cignal HD Spikers
Sixth title

Team roster:
Sandy Domenick Montero, Alfred Gerald Valbuena, Joshua Retamar, Steve Rotter, Mark Frederick Calado, Vince Patrick Lorenzo, John Paul Bugaoan (c), Wendel Concepcion Miguel, Joshua Umandal, Nestin Gwaza, Ruvince Abrot, Martin Bugaoan, John Mark Ronquillo, Gabriel EJ Casaña, Kris Cian Silang, Lloyd Josafat, Louie Ramirez
Head coach:
Dexter Clamor

== Awards ==
Award	Player	Team	Ref.
Conference Most Valuable Player	Jude Garcia	Criss Cross	
Finals Most Valuable Player	Louie Ramirez	Cignal	
1st Best Outside Spiker	Nico Almendras	Criss Cross	
2nd Best Outside Spiker	Sherwin Caritativo	Savouge	
1st Best Middle Blocker	Gian Carlo Glorioso	Criss Cross	
2nd Best Middle Blocker	Giles Jeffer Torres	Savouge	
Best Opposite Spiker	Zhydryx Saavedra	DN Steel-FEU	
Best Setter	Ish Polvorosa	Criss Cross	
Best Libero	Vince Lorenzo	Cignal	

== Statistics leaders ==
Statistics leaders correct at the end of the preliminary round.

Best Scorers
Rank	Name	Points
1	Jude Garcia	150
2	Zhydryx Saavedra	133
3	Joeven Dela Vega	110
4	Charles Jordan Segui	109
4	Mikko Espartero	109

Best Spikers
Rank	Name	%Succ
1	Jude Garcia	53.88
2	Mikko Espartero	48.66
3	Zhydryx Saavedra	47.93
4	Joshua Umandal	47.10
5	Noel Kampton	46.21

Best Blockers
Rank	Name	Avg
1	Gian Carlo Glorioso	1.10
2	Giles Jeffer Torres	0.74
3	Nilo Jasmin	0.67
4	Doula Ndongala	0.64
5	Peter Quiel	0.60

Best Servers
Rank	Name	Avg
1	Joeven Dela Vega	0.37
2	Nico Almendras	0.27
3	Louie Pudadera	0.20
4	Marvin Villanueva	0.20
5	Lloyd Josafat	0.19

Best Diggers
Rank	Name	Avg
1	Joshua Cruz	2.13
2	Dan Carlo Dela Cruz	1.77
3	Menard Guerrero	1.68
4	Jeremy Santos	1.60
5	John Philip Pepito	1.43

Best Setters
Rank	Name	Avg
1	Benny Martinez	4.89
2	Ish Polvorosa	4.70
3	Jerico Adajar	3.43
4	Louie Pudadera	3.33
5	Michael Vince Imperial	2.97

Best Receivers
Rank	Name	%Succ
1	Vince Lorenzo	62.59
2	Rikko Marmeto	60.36
3	Vennie Paul Ceballos	51.94
4	Jeremy Santos	49.75
5	Joshua Cruz	48.54

== STPC player of the week ==
Week	Player	Team	Ref.
October 16–27	Sherwin Caritativo	Savouge Spin Doctors	
October 30–November 3	Louie Ramirez	Cignal HD Spikers	
November 6–10	Zhydryx Saavedra	DN Steel-FEU Ultras	
November 13–17	Jude Garcia	Criss Cross King Crunchers	
November 20–24	Jude Garcia	Criss Cross King Crunchers	
November 25–December 1	Gian Glorioso	Criss Cross King Crunchers	
December 4–8	Jude Garcia	Criss Cross King Crunchers	
December 11–13	Sherwin Caritativo	Savouge Spin Doctors	

== See also ==
- 2024 Premier Volleyball League Invitational Conference
