= 2026 PVL Press Corps Awards Night =

- Type: Sports
- Awarded for: Premier Volleyball League and Spikers' Turf
- Date: May 30, 2026
- Venue: Novotel Manila Araneta City
- Country: Philippines
- Presented by: ArenaPlus, Immuni+, Pilipinas Live, and PVL Press Corps

The 2026 Pilipinas Live PVL Press Corps Awards Night was the 2nd edition awards show of the PVL Press Corps Awards Night. It will also recognize personalities from the main volleyball leagues in the Philippines, Premier Volleyball League, and Spikers' Turf. It was held on May 30, 2026, at the Novotel Manila Araneta City in Quezon City.

== Criteria ==
The winners will be decided based on overall statistics from PVL on Tour preseason tournament and the three conferences and votes from team representatives and members of the PVL Press Corps to ensure objective and impartial selections. The scope of the awards will span the following conferences/seasons:

- Premier Volleyball League
  - 2025 PVL on Tour;
  - 2025 Reinforced Conference; and
  - 2026 All-Filipino Conference.
- Spikers' Turf
  - 2025 Invitational Conference; and
  - 2026 Open Conference.

== Premier Volleyball League awardees ==
=== Main awards ===
Individual awards
Award	Recipient	Team	Ref.
Most Valuable Player of the Season	Trisha Tubu (171.868); Erika Santos (157.98); Brooke Van Sickle (155.229); Vanie Gandler (152.634)	Farm Fresh Foxies	
Rookie of the Year	Bella Belen (186.284); AC Miner (85); Jean Asis (83.896); Riza Nogales (64.479)	Capital1 Solar Spikers	
Coach of the Year	Rald Ricafort; Shaq Delos Santos; Sherwin Meneses	PLDT High Speed Hitters	
Executive of the Year	Jonathan Ng; Jude Turcuato; Frank Lao	Creamline Cool Smashers	
Mythical team
Position	Player	Team	Ref.
Outside spikers	Bella Belen	Capital1 Solar Spikers	
Outside spikers	Savi Davison	PLDT High Speed Hitters	
Middle blockers	Jeanette Panaga	Creamline Cool Smashers	
Middle blockers	Majoy Baron	PLDT High Speed Hitters	
Opposite spiker	Trisha Tubu	Farm Fresh Foxies	
Setter	Gel Cayuna	Cignal Super Spikers	
Libero	Kath Arado	PLDT High Speed Hitters	
Team awards
Award	Team	Record	Ref.
Team of the Year	Creamline Cool Smashers; PLDT High Speed Hitters; Cignal Super Spikers	2026 All-Filipino Conference champions	

=== Special awards ===
Special awards
Award	Player	Team	Ref.
Most Improved Player	Erika Santos; Justine Jazareno; Cloanne Mondoñedo; Chinnie Arroyo	Cignal Super Spikers	
Comeback Player of the Year	Kim Kianna Dy; Ces Molina; Jema Galanza; Kat Tolentino	PLDT High Speed Hitters	
Miss Quality Minutes	Alyssa Valdez; Chennie Tagaod; Royse Tubino	Creamline Cool Smashers	
Fanvote awards
Award	Recipient/Event	Team(s)	Ref.
Star of the Night	Majoy Baron	PLDT High Speed Hitters	
Game of the Year	2026 All-Filipino; Finals Game 2	Creamline Cool Smashers & Cignal Super Spikers	

== Spikers' Turf awardees ==
Individual award
Award	Player	Team	Ref.
Most Valuable Player of the Season	Jude Garcia	Criss Cross King Crunchers	
Coach of the Year	Tai Bundit	Criss Cross King Crunchers	
Mythical team
Position	Player	Team	Ref.
Outside spikers	Jude Garcia	Criss Cross King Crunchers	
Outside spikers	Noel Kampton	Criss Cross King Crunchers	
Middle blockers	Giles Torres	Savouge Spin Doctors	
Middle blockers	John Paul Bugaoan	Savouge Spin Doctors	
Opposite spiker	Mark Calado	Savouge Spin Doctors	
Setter	Adrian Villados	Criss Cross King Crunchers	
Libero	John Philip Pepito	Criss Cross King Crunchers	
Team awards
Award	Team	Record	Ref.
Team of the Year	Criss Cross King Crunchers	2025 Invitational Conference champions 2026 Open Conference champions	
Fanvote awards
Award	Recipient/Event	Team(s)	Ref.
Star of the Night	Mark Calado	Savouge Spin Doctors	

== Other awards ==
- Special Citation
  - Alas Pilipinas women's beach volleyball team
  - Alas Pilipinas men's volleyball team
