= 2024–25 Spikers' Turf season =

Eighth season of the Spikers' Turf

- League: Spikers' Turf
- Sport: Volleyball
- Duration: March 13, 2024 – April 6, 2025
- TV partner: One Sports

Conferences
- 2024 Open champions: Cignal HD Spikers
- 2024 Open runners-up: Criss Cross King Crunchers
- 2024 Invitational champions: Cignal HD Spikers
- 2024 Invitational runners-up: Criss Cross King Crunchers
- 2025 Open champions: Cignal HD Spikers
- 2025 Open runners-up: Criss Cross King Crunchers

Spiker's Turf seasons
- ← 2023 2025–26 →

The 2024–25 Spikers' Turf season was the eighth season of Spikers' Turf. The season began on March 13, 2024 with the start of the 2024 Open Conference. Due to organizers Sports Vision undergoing a calendar shift for its leagues, this season ended on April 6, 2025 with the culmination of the 2025 Open Conference. The 2025 PVL Press Corps Awards Night on May 28, 2025 marked the formal conclusion of the league year.

The Cignal HD Spikers won all three conferences this season, but due to the retroactive nature of the calendar shift, it wasn't referred to as a Grand Slam.

== 2024 Open Conference ==
The 2024 Spikers' Turf Open Conference was the first conference of the 2024–25 season of Spikers' Turf. The tournament began on March 13 and ended on May 10, 2024.

A total of nine teams were battling for the championship title, including the three newly formed teams, namely the Criss Cross King Crunchers, Maverick Hard Hitters, and RichMarc Sports 3B Elite Spikers.

The Cignal HD Spikers emerged as the champions of this conference, bagging their fifth title. They defeat the newcomers of the league, Criss Cross King Crunchers, in two games. PGJC-Navy Sea Lions won the bronze over the D' Navigators Iloilo via a superior points ratio. Jude Garcia bagged the Conference MVP award, while Bryan Bagunas won the Finals MVP plum.

=== Participating teams ===
2024 Spikers' Turf Open Conference
Abbr.	Team	Affiliation	Head coach	Team captain
CHD	Cignal HD Spikers	Cignal TV, Inc.	(Philippines) Dexter Clamor	John Paul Bugaoan
CKC	Criss Cross King Crunchers	Republic Biscuit Corporation	(Thailand) Tai Bundit	Ysay Marasigan
DNV	D' Navigators Iloilo	Iloilo City	(Philippines) Boyet Delmoro	John Michael Apolinario
MAV	Maverick Hard Hitters	Maverick Sports Team	(Philippines) Erickson Ramos	Razzel Palisoc
PJN	PGJC-Navy Sea Lions	Philippine Navy	(Philippines) George Pascua	Greg Dolor
PAF	Philippine Air Force Airmen	Philippine Air Force	(Philippines) Jeffrey Malabanan	Rodolfo Labrador Jr.
RMS	RichMarc Sports 3B Elite Spikers	RichMarc Sports / 3B Production & Entertainment	(Philippines) Arjay Francisco	Carlo Almario
SVG	Savouge Spin Doctors	Savouge Aesthetics Philippines	(Philippines) Sammy Acaylar	Jhun Lorenz Señoron
VNS	VNS-Nasty Griffins	VNS Management Group	(Philippines) Ralph Raymund Ocampo	Michael Doria

=== Preliminary round ===
Pos	Team	Pld	W	L	Pts	SW	SL	SR	SPW	SPL	SPR	Qualification
1	Cignal HD Spikers	8	8	0	21	24	6	4.000	707	559	1.265	Final round
2	Criss Cross King Crunchers	8	7	1	22	23	6	3.833	712	557	1.278	Final round
3	PGJC-Navy Sea Lions	8	6	2	16	19	10	1.900	657	597	1.101	Final round
4	D' Navigators Iloilo	8	5	3	17	20	11	1.818	693	659	1.052	Final round
5	Savouge Spin Doctors	8	4	4	13	16	12	1.333	647	612	1.057	
6	VNS-Nasty Griffins	8	2	6	8	10	19	0.526	507	544	0.932	
7	Maverick Hard Hitters	8	2	6	6	7	19	0.368	488	600	0.813	
8	Philippine Air Force Airmen	8	2	6	5	7	21	0.333	451	553	0.816	
9	RichMarc Sports 3B Elite Spikers	8	0	8	0	2	24	0.083	476	647	0.736	

Source: Spikers' Turf – Standings

=== Final round ===
==== Semifinals ====
Pos	Team	Pld	W	L	Pts	SW	SL	SR	SPW	SPL	SPR	Qualification
1	Cignal HD Spikers	3	2	1	7	8	3	2.667	263	223	1.179	Championship
2	Criss Cross King Crunchers	3	2	1	5	7	5	1.400	269	245	1.098	Championship
3	D' Navigators Iloilo	3	1	2	4	5	7	0.714	256	277	0.924	3rd place
4	PGJC-Navy Sea Lions	3	1	2	2	3	8	0.375	219	268	0.817	3rd place

Source: spikersturf.ph

==== Finals ====
===== 3rd place =====
PGJC-Navy wins the series, 1–1, via points ratio of 1.049 vs. 0.953

Date	Time	Venue		Score		Set 1	Set 2	Set 3	Set 4	Set 5	Total	Report
May 8	16:00	RMC	D' Navigators Iloilo	1–3	PGJC-Navy Sea Lions	17–25	25–16	18–25	31–33		91–99	P2
May 10	16:00	RMC	PGJC-Navy Sea Lions	1–3	D' Navigators Iloilo	23–25	20–25	25–15	23–25		91–90	P2

===== Championship =====
Cignal wins series, 2–0

Date	Time	Venue		Score		Set 1	Set 2	Set 3	Set 4	Set 5	Total	Report
May 8	18:00	RMC	Cignal HD Spikers	3–1	Criss Cross King Crunchers	27–25	23–25	25–21	25–19		100–90	P2
May 10	18:00	RMC	Criss Cross King Crunchers	0–3	Cignal HD Spikers	23–25	25–27	21–25			69–77	P2

=== Awards ===
Award	Player	Team	Ref.
Conference Most Valuable Player	Jude Garcia	Criss Cross	
Finals Most Valuable Player	Bryan Bagunas	Cignal	
1st Best Outside Spiker	Joshua Umandal	Cignal	
2nd Best Outside Spiker	Greg Dolor	PGJC-Navy	
1st Best Middle Blocker	Peter Quiel	PGJC-Navy	
2nd Best Middle Blocker	Abdurasad Nursiddik	D' Navigators	
Best Opposite Spiker	Francis Saura	D' Navigators	
Best Setter	Kris Cian Silang	Cignal	
Best Libero	Jack Kalingking	PGJC-Navy	

=== Final standings ===
Rank	Team
1st place, gold medalist(s)	Cignal HD Spikers
2nd place, silver medalist(s)	Criss Cross King Crunchers
3rd place, bronze medalist(s)	PGJC-Navy Sea Lions
4	D' Navigators Iloilo
5	Savouge Spin Doctors
6	VNS-Nasty Griffins
7	Maverick Hard Hitters
8	Philippine Air Force Airmen
9	RichMarc Sports 3B Elite Spikers

== 2024 Invitational Conference ==
The 2024 Spikers' Turf Invitational Conference was the second conference of the 2024–25 season of Spikers' Turf.

A total of eleven teams are battling for the championship title.

=== Participating teams ===
2024 Spikers' Turf Invitational Conference
Abbr.	Team	Affiliation	Head coach	Team captain
Local teams
CBT	Chichi DHTSI Braderhood Titans	Digital Hybrid Transport Systems / Chi Chi Drinks PH	(Philippines) Roberto Javier	(Philippines) Jonathan Sorio
CHD	Cignal HD Spikers	Cignal TV, Inc.	(Philippines) Dexter Clamor	(Philippines) John Paul Bugaoan
CKC	Criss Cross King Crunchers	Republic Biscuit Corporation	(Thailand) Tai Bundit	(Philippines) Ysay Marasigan
DNV	D' Navigators Iloilo	Iloilo City	(Philippines) Boyet Delmoro	(Philippines) John Michael Apolinario
FEU	DN Steel-FEU Ultras	DN Steel Group of Companies / Far Eastern University	(Philippines) Eddieson Orcullo	(Philippines) Jelord Talisayan
DLSU	EcoOil-La Salle Green Oilers	Eco Oil Ltd. / De La Salle University	(Philippines) Jose Roque	(Philippines) Menard Guerrero
MMB	Martelli Meats Master Butchers	Maverick Sports Team	(Philippines) Michael Conde	(Philippines) Jerome Michael Cordez
PJN	PGJC-Navy Sea Lions	Philippine Navy	(Philippines) George Pascua	(Philippines) Greg Dolor
SVG	Savouge Spin Doctors	Savouge Aesthetics Philippines	(Philippines) Sydney Calderon	(Philippines) Hero Austria
VNS	VNS Griffins	VNS Management Group	(Philippines) Ralph Raymund Ocampo	(Philippines) Charles Jordan Segui
Foreign guest team
KON	KondohGumi Hyogo	Kondogumi Co. Ltd. / Hyogo Prefectural University Volleyball Association	(Japan) Kota Kunichika	(Japan) Kakiuchi Kohsuke

=== Preliminary round ===
Pos	Team	Pld	W	L	Pts	SW	SL	SR	SPW	SPL	SPR	Qualification
1	Criss Cross King Crunchers	9	8	1	25	26	4	6.500	727	536	1.356	Final round
2	Cignal HD Spikers	9	8	1	24	26	6	4.333	770	607	1.269	Final round
3	DN Steel-FEU Ultras	9	7	2	19	23	13	1.769	823	776	1.061	Final round
4	Savouge Spin Doctors	9	6	3	17	21	13	1.615	783	701	1.117	Final round
5	EcoOil-La Salle Green Oilers	9	5	4	15	15	13	1.154	633	610	1.038	
6	PGJC-Navy Sea Lions	9	5	4	15	16	14	1.143	691	654	1.057	
7	VNS Griffins	9	3	6	10	11	19	0.579	612	697	0.878	
8	D' Navigators Iloilo	9	2	7	5	9	23	0.391	668	720	0.928	
9	Martelli Meats Master Butchers	9	1	8	4	6	24	0.250	535	713	0.750	
10	Chichi DHTSI Braderhood Titans	9	0	9	1	3	27	0.111	502	730	0.688	

Source: Spikers' Turf – Standings

=== Final round ===
==== Semifinals ====
Pos	Team	Pld	W	L	Pts	SW	SL	SR	SPW	SPL	SPR	Qualification
1	Criss Cross King Crunchers	4	4	0	12	12	2	6.000	346	270	1.281	Championship match
2	Cignal HD Spikers	4	3	1	9	10	3	3.333	306	251	1.219	Championship match
3	Savouge Spin Doctors	4	2	2	6	7	6	1.167	305	298	1.023	3rd place match
4	DN Steel-FEU Ultras	4	1	3	3	3	9	0.333	240	273	0.879	3rd place match
5	KondohGumi Hyogo	4	0	4	0	0	12	0.000	204	309	0.660	

Source: Spikers' Turf – Standings

==== Finals ====
===== 3rd place =====
Date	Time	Venue		Score		Set 1	Set 2	Set 3	Set 4	Set 5	Total	Report
Dec 15	16:00	PSA	Savouge Spin Doctors	3–1	DN Steel-FEU Ultras	25–21	16–25	25–14	25–17		91–77	P2

===== Championship =====
Date	Time	Venue		Score		Set 1	Set 2	Set 3	Set 4	Set 5	Total	Report
Dec 15	18:00	PSA	Cignal HD Spikers	3–0	Criss Cross King Crunchers	25–19	25–19	26–24			76–62	P2

=== Awards ===
Award	Player	Team	Ref.
Conference Most Valuable Player	Jude Garcia	Criss Cross	
Finals Most Valuable Player	Louie Ramirez	Cignal	
1st Best Outside Spiker	Nico Almendras	Criss Cross	
2nd Best Outside Spiker	Sherwin Caritativo	Savouge	
1st Best Middle Blocker	Gian Carlo Glorioso	Criss Cross	
2nd Best Middle Blocker	Giles Jeffer Torres	Savouge	
Best Opposite Spiker	Zhydryx Saavedra	DN Steel-FEU	
Best Setter	Ish Polvorosa	Criss Cross	
Best Libero	Vince Lorenzo	Cignal	

=== Final standings ===
Rank	Team
1st place, gold medalist(s)	Cignal HD Spikers
2nd place, silver medalist(s)	Criss Cross King Crunchers
3rd place, bronze medalist(s)	Savouge Spin Doctors
4	DN Steel-FEU Ultras
5	KondohGumi Hyogo
6	EcoOil-La Salle Green Oilers
7	PGJC-Navy Sea Lions
8	VNS Griffins
9	D' Navigators Iloilo
10	Martelli Meats Master Butchers
11	Chichi DHTSI Braderhood Titans

== 2025 Open Conference ==
The third and final conference of the season was the 2025 Open Conference, which ran from February 21 to April 6, 2025.

=== Participating teams ===
2025 Spikers' Turf Open Conference
Abbr.	Team	Affiliation	Head coach	Team captain
ALP	Alpha Insurance Protectors	Alpha Insurance & Surety Company Inc.	(Philippines) Mike Santos	Edward Camposano
CHD	Cignal HD Spikers	Cignal TV, Inc.	(Philippines) Dexter Clamor	John Paul Bugaoan
CKC	Criss Cross King Crunchers	Republic Biscuit Corporation	(Thailand) Tai Bundit	Ysay Marasigan
PJN	PGJC-Navy Sea Lions	Philippine Navy	(Philippines) George Pascua	Greg Dolor
SVG	Savouge Spin Doctors	Savouge Aesthetics Philippines	(Philippines) Sydney Calderon	Hero Austria
VNS	VNS-Laticrete Griffins	VNS Management Group	(Philippines) Ralph Raymund Ocampo	Charles Jordan Segui

=== Preliminary round ===
Pos	Team	Pld	W	L	Pts	SW	SL	SR	SPW	SPL	SPR	Qualification
1	Criss Cross King Crunchers	10	10	0	28	30	6	5.000	863	660	1.308	Final round
2	Cignal HD Spikers	10	8	2	23	25	10	2.500	820	722	1.136	Final round
3	Savouge Spin Doctors	10	6	4	20	24	14	1.714	846	801	1.056	Final round
4	VNS-Laticrete Griffins	10	3	7	10	11	23	0.478	689	800	0.861	Final round
5	Alpha Insurance Protectors	10	2	8	7	11	24	0.458	730	816	0.895	
6	PGJC-Navy Sea Lions	10	1	9	2	5	29	0.172	668	827	0.808	

Source: Spikers' Turf – Standings

=== Final round ===
==== Semifinals ====
Pos	Team	Pld	W	L	Pts	SW	SL	SR	SPW	SPL	SPR	Qualification
1	Criss Cross King Crunchers	3	3	0	9	9	1	9.000	251	197	1.274	Championship match
2	Cignal HD Spikers	3	2	1	6	7	3	2.333	243	203	1.197	Championship match
3	Savouge Spin Doctors	3	1	2	3	3	7	0.429	217	235	0.923	3rd place match
4	VNS-Laticrete Griffins	3	0	3	0	1	9	0.111	176	252	0.698	3rd place match

Source: Spikers' Turf – Standings

==== Finals ====
===== 3rd place =====
Savouge wins series, 2–0

Date	Time	Venue		Score		Set 1	Set 2	Set 3	Set 4	Set 5	Total	Report
Apr 02	15:30	RMC	Savouge Spin Doctors	3–1	VNS-Laticrete Griffins	21–25	25–15	26–24	25–22		97–86	P2
Apr 04	15:30	PSA	VNS-Laticrete Griffins	0–3	Savouge Spin Doctors	19–25	23–25	22–25			64–75	P2

===== Championship =====
Cignal wins series, 2–1

Date	Time	Venue		Score		Set 1	Set 2	Set 3	Set 4	Set 5	Total	Report
Apr 02	18:30	RMC	Criss Cross King Crunchers	2–3	Cignal HD Spikers	25–22	19–25	25–22	21–25	12–15	102–109	P2
Apr 04	18:30	PSA	Cignal HD Spikers	2–3	Criss Cross King Crunchers	20–25	15–25	25–18	25–23	12–15	97–106	P2
Apr 06	16:00	PSA	Criss Cross King Crunchers	0–3	Cignal HD Spikers	22–25	16–25	26–28			64–78	P2

=== Awards ===
Award	Player	Team	Ref.
Conference Most Valuable Player	Jude Garcia	Criss Cross	
Finals Most Valuable Player	Steven Rotter	Cignal	
1st Best Outside Spiker	Mark Calado	Savouge	
2nd Best Outside Spiker	Sherwin Caritativo	Savouge	
1st Best Middle Blocker	John Paul Bugaoan	Cignal	
2nd Best Middle Blocker	Gian Carlo Glorioso	Criss Cross	
Best Opposite Spiker	Steven Rotter	Cignal	
Best Setter	Ish Polvorosa	Criss Cross	
Best Libero	Vince Lorenzo	Cignal	

=== Final standings ===
Rank	Team
1st place, gold medalist(s)	Cignal HD Spikers
2nd place, silver medalist(s)	Criss Cross King Crunchers
3rd place, bronze medalist(s)	Savouge Spin Doctors
4	VNS-Laticrete Griffins
5	Alpha Insurance Protectors
6	PGJC-Navy Sea Lions

== Conference results ==
Conference	Champion	Runner-up	3rd	4th	5th	6th	7th	8th	9th	10th	11th
2024 Open	Cignal	Criss Cross	PGJC; Navy	Iloilo	Savouge	VNS	Maverick	Air Force	RichMarc; Sports	—N/a	
2024 Invitational	Cignal	Criss Cross	Savouge	DN Steel; FEU	KondohGumi	EcoOil; La Salle	PGJC; Navy	VNS	Iloilo	Martelli Meats	Chichi DHTSI
2025 Open	Cignal	Criss Cross	Savouge	VNS	Alpha Insurance	PGJC; Navy	—N/a				
