= 2024 Spikers' Turf Open Conference =

First Conference of the 2024 SPT season

- Duration: March 13 – May 10, 2024
- Matches: 46
- Teams: 9
- Attendance: 15,305 (333 per match)
- TV partner(s): One Sports; One Sports+ Pilipinas Live

Results
- Champions: Cignal HD Spikers
- Runners-up: Criss Cross King Crunchers
- Third place: PGJC–Navy Sea Lions
- Fourth place: D' Navigators Iloilo

Awards
- Conference MVP: Jude Garcia
- Finals MVP: Bryan Bagunas
- Best OH: Joshua Umandal; Greg Dolor
- Best MB: Peter Quiel; Abdurasad Nursiddik
- Best OPP: Francis Saura
- Best Setter: Kris Cian Silang
- Best Libero: Jack Kalingking

Spikers' Turf Open Conference chronology
- < 2023 2025 >

Spikers' Turf conference chronology
- < 2023 Invitational 2024 Invitational >

The 2024 Spikers' Turf Open Conference was the first conference of the 2024–25 season of Spikers' Turf. The tournament began on March 13 and ended on May 10, 2024.

A total of nine teams were battling for the championship title, including the three newly formed teams, namely the Criss Cross King Crunchers, Maverick Hard Hitters, and RichMarc Sports 3B Elite Spikers.

The Cignal HD Spikers emerged as the champions of this conference, bagging their fifth title. They defeat the newcomers of the league, Criss Cross King Crunchers, in two games. PGJC-Navy Sea Lions won the bronze over the D' Navigators Iloilo via a superior points ratio. Jude Garcia bagged the Conference MVP award, while Bryan Bagunas won the Finals MVP plum.

== Participating teams ==
2024 Spikers' Turf Open Conference
Abbr.	Team	Affiliation	Head coach	Team captain
CHD	Cignal HD Spikers	Cignal TV, Inc.	(Philippines) Dexter Clamor	John Paul Bugaoan
CKC	Criss Cross King Crunchers	Republic Biscuit Corporation	(Thailand) Tai Bundit	Ysay Marasigan
DNV	D' Navigators Iloilo	Iloilo City	(Philippines) Boyet Delmoro	John Michael Apolinario
MAV	Maverick Hard Hitters	Maverick Sports Team	(Philippines) Erickson Ramos	Razzel Palisoc
PJN	PGJC-Navy Sea Lions	Philippine Navy	(Philippines) George Pascua	Greg Dolor
PAF	Philippine Air Force Airmen	Philippine Air Force	(Philippines) Jeffrey Malabanan	Rodolfo Labrador Jr.
RMS	RichMarc Sports 3B Elite Spikers	RichMarc Sports / 3B Production & Entertainment	(Philippines) Arjay Francisco	Carlo Almario
SVG	Savouge Spin Doctors	Savouge Aesthetics Philippines	(Philippines) Sammy Acaylar	Jhun Lorenz Señoron
VNS	VNS-Nasty Griffins	VNS Management Group	(Philippines) Ralph Raymund Ocampo	Michael Doria

== Venues ==
Preliminary round
Pasig	Paco, Manila	Antipolo
PhilSports Arena	Paco Arena	Ynares Center
Capacity: 10,000	Capacity: 1,000	Capacity: 7,400
Preliminary & Final round
Malate, Manila
Rizal Memorial Sports Complex (Rizal Memorial Coliseum & Ninoy Aquino Stadium)
Capacity: 6,100

== Transactions ==
=== Team additions and transfers ===
The following are the players who transferred to another team for the upcoming conference.

Player	Moving from	Moving to	Ref.
Cian Silang	AMC Cotabato Spikers	Cignal HD Spikers	
Giles Torres	D' Navigators Iloilo	Cignal HD Spikers	
Mfena Gwaza	D' Navigators Iloilo	Cignal HD Spikers	
Vince Lorenzo	D' Navigators Iloilo	Cignal HD Spikers	
Madz Gampong	Sta. Rosa City Lions	Cignal HD Spikers	
Ron Rosales	Sta. Rosa City Lions	Cignal HD Spikers	
Bryan Bagunas	Win Streak (TVL)	Cignal HD Spikers	
Rex Intal	AMC Cotabato Spikers	Criss Cross King Crunchers	
Chumason Njigha	Cignal HD Spikers	Criss Cross King Crunchers	
Manuel Sumanguid III	Cignal HD Spikers	Criss Cross King Crunchers	
Ysay Marasigan	Cignal HD Spikers	Criss Cross King Crunchers	
Jude Garcia	Creamline Cool Smashers (beach volleyball)	Criss Cross King Crunchers	
Krung Arbasto	Creamline Cool Smashers (beach volleyball)	Criss Cross King Crunchers	
Juvie Mangaring	Xentromall–EAC Generals	Criss Cross King Crunchers	
Kim Malabunga	Imus City–AJAA Spikers	Criss Cross King Crunchers	
Marck Espejo	Incheon Korean Air Jumbos (V-League)	Criss Cross King Crunchers	
Gian Glorioso	Savouge RTU-Basilan Golden Thunders	Criss Cross King Crunchers	
Ish Polvorosa	Sta. Rosa City Lions	Criss Cross King Crunchers	
Jaron Requinton	UST Golden Spikers (UAAP)	Criss Cross King Crunchers	
Phillip Bagalay	VNS Griffins	Criss Cross King Crunchers	
Kim Dayandante	AMC Cotabato Spikers	D' Navigators Iloilo	
Arvin Christian Estomata	Mag-aba NHS (Antique)	D' Navigators Iloilo	
Justine Santos	MKA-San Beda Red Spikers	D' Navigators Iloilo	
Edward Camposano	PGJC-Navy Sea Lions	D' Navigators Iloilo	
Esmail Kasim	Philippine Coast Guard Dolphins	D' Navigators Iloilo	
Barbie San Andres	VNS Griffins	D' Navigators Iloilo	
Jayvee Sumagaysay	VNS Griffins	D' Navigators Iloilo	
France Lander Racaza	Alpha Omega Elite Spikers	Maverick Hard Hitters	
Jay Sequitin	Alpha Omega Elite Spikers	Maverick Hard Hitters	
Jethro Cabillan	Alpha Omega Elite Spikers	Maverick Hard Hitters	
Kim Tan	Alpha Omega Elite Spikers	Maverick Hard Hitters	
Razzel Palisoc	Alpha Omega Elite Spikers	Maverick Hard Hitters	
Ricardo Alfaro	Alpha Omega Elite Spikers	Maverick Hard Hitters	
Stephen Jason Sundiang	Alpha Omega Elite Spikers	Maverick Hard Hitters	
Jan Neves Climaco	Coronado School of Quezon City, Inc.(Quezon City)	Maverick Hard Hitters	
Jerome Michael Cordez	D' Navigators Iloilo	Maverick Hard Hitters	
Juan Miguel Galgana	PWU Patriots (Manila)	Maverick Hard Hitters	
Romeo Teodones	Vanguard Volley Hitters	Maverick Hard Hitters	
Jayson Uy	Philippine Army Troopers	PGJC-Navy Sea Lions	
Kevin Leberato	Philippine Army Troopers	PGJC-Navy Sea Lions	
Louie Pudadera	University of St. La Salle (Bacolod)	PGJC-Navy Sea Lions	
Clark Fernandez	VNS Griffins	PGJC-Navy Sea Lions	
Matthew Andrei Mamora	Arellano Braves (NCAA)	RichMarc Sports 3B Elite Spikers	
James Michael Balisi	EAC Generals NCAA	RichMarc Sports 3B Elite Spikers	
Gideon James Guadalupe	ICC Blue Hawks (Negros)	RichMarc Sports 3B Elite Spikers	
Bonjomar Castel	Imus City-AJAA Spikers	RichMarc Sports 3B Elite Spikers	
Kaiser Lark Rosales	JRU Heavy Bombers (NCAA)	RichMarc Sports 3B Elite Spikers	
Carlo Almario	MKA–San Beda Red Spikers	RichMarc Sports 3B Elite Spikers	
Milover Parcon	PGJC-Navy Sea Lions	RichMarc Sports 3B Elite Spikers	
Kurl Rosete	PGJC-Navy Sea Lions	RichMarc Sports 3B Elite Spikers	
James Christian Eugenio	San Sebastian Stags (NCAA)	RichMarc Sports 3B Elite Spikers	
Marc Dominic Martin	San Sebastian Stags (NCAA)	RichMarc Sports 3B Elite Spikers	
Mel Clarence De Guzman	San Sebastian Stags (NCAA)	RichMarc Sports 3B Elite Spikers	
Kernel Ipulan	United Meycauayan Golden Spikers (Bulacan)	RichMarc Sports 3B Elite Spikers	
Argie Dacles	UE Red Warriors (UAAP)	RichMarc Sports 3B Elite Spikers	
Jerome Cyril Eugenio	UE Red Warriors (UAAP)	RichMarc Sports 3B Elite Spikers	
Ralph Ryan Imperial	UE Red Warriors (UAAP)	RichMarc Sports 3B Elite Spikers	
Rainier Mansilungan	UE Red Warriors (UAAP)	RichMarc Sports 3B Elite Spikers	
Jonathan Cedric Eugenio	VNS Griffins	RichMarc Sports 3B Elite Spikers	
John Diwa	Alpha Omega Elite Spikers	Savouge Spin Doctors	
Chris Salvador	Arellano Chiefs (NCAA)	Savouge Spin Doctors	
Amber Gervacio	EAC Generals (NCAA)	Savouge Spin Doctors	
Vince Imperial	EAC Generals (NCAA)	Savouge Spin Doctors	
Joshua Lagmay	Perpetual Altas (Laguna)	Savouge Spin Doctors	
Sherwin Caritativo	Perpetual Altas (NCAA)	Savouge Spin Doctors	
Hero Austria	Sta. Rosa City Lions	Savouge Spin Doctors	
Lorenz Calayag	San Beda Red Lions (NCAA)	Savouge Spin Doctors	
Mikel Mendoza	San Sebastian Golden Stags (NCAA)	Savouge Spin Doctors	
Joven Camaganakan	Sta. Rosa City Lions	Savouge Spin Doctors	
Rikko Marmeto	Sta. Rosa City Lions	Savouge Spin Doctors	
Eryn De Lima	UE Red Warriors (UAAP)	Savouge Spin Doctors	
Jom Reyes	UE Red Warriors (UAAP)	Savouge Spin Doctors	
Jeremy Pedrosa	VNS Griffins	Savouge Spin Doctors	
Mark Deximo	VNS Griffins	Savouge Spin Doctors	
Justin Yatco	Benilde Blazers (NCAA)	VNS-Nasty Griffins	
Michael Doria	Cabstars–City of Cabuyao	VNS-Nasty Griffins	
Afred Pagulong	Mapua Cardinals (NCAA)	VNS-Nasty Griffins	
Dominic Castañeda	MKA–San Beda Red Spikers	VNS-Nasty Griffins	
Kennry Malinis	NU Bulldogs (UAAP)	VNS-Nasty Griffins	
Louise Bartolome	PATTS Seahorses (Parañaque)	VNS-Nasty Griffins	
Manuel Medina	Philippine Army Troopers	VNS-Nasty Griffins	
Juniel Intal	PUP Mighty Maroons (SCUAA)	VNS-Nasty Griffins	
Keith Deferia	Sta. Rosa City Lions	VNS-Nasty Griffins	
Kenneth Culabat	UE Red Warriors (UAAP)	VNS-Nasty Griffins	
Howard Guerra	VNS Griffins (junior's team)	VNS-Nasty Griffins	
Jao Arcillo	VNS Griffins (junior's team)	VNS-Nasty Griffins	
Kim Liray	VNS Griffins (junior's team)	VNS-Nasty Griffins	
Terrence Marticion	VNS Griffins (junior's team)	VNS-Nasty Griffins	
Titus Villacrusis	VNS Griffins (junior's team)	VNS-Nasty Griffins	
Jester Bornel	Xentromall–EAC Generals	VNS-Nasty Griffins	

== Format ==
Preliminary round

1. The nine teams are competing in a single round-robin elimination.
2. Top four teams advance to semifinals.

Semifinals

1. The four teams will compete again in a single round-robin elimination.
2. The third and fourth-ranked teams will relegate to the 3rd place series.
3. The first and second-ranked teams will advance to the championship series.

Finals

1. Best-of-three series.
2. Bronze medal: SF Ranked 3 vs. SF Ranked 4
3. Gold medal: SF Ranked 1 vs. SF Ranked 2

== Pool standing procedure ==
- First, teams are ranked by the number of matches won.
- If the number of matches won is tied, the tied teams are then ranked by match points, wherein:
  - Match won 3–0 or 3–1: 3 match points for the winner, 0 match points for the loser.
  - Match won 3–2: 2 match points for the winner, 1 match point for the loser.
- In case of any further ties, the following criteria shall be used:
1. Set ratio: number of sets won divided by number of sets lost.
2. Setpoint ratio: number of points scored divided by number of points allowed.
3. Head-to-head standings: any remaining tied teams are ranked based on the results of head-to-head matches involving the teams in question.

== Preliminary round ==
=== Ranking ===
Pos	Team	Pld	W	L	Pts	SW	SL	SR	SPW	SPL	SPR	Qualification
1	Cignal HD Spikers	8	8	0	21	24	6	4.000	707	559	1.265	Final round
2	Criss Cross King Crunchers	8	7	1	22	23	6	3.833	712	557	1.278	Final round
3	PGJC-Navy Sea Lions	8	6	2	16	19	10	1.900	657	597	1.101	Final round
4	D' Navigators Iloilo	8	5	3	17	20	11	1.818	693	659	1.052	Final round
5	Savouge Spin Doctors	8	4	4	13	16	12	1.333	647	612	1.057	
6	VNS-Nasty Griffins	8	2	6	8	10	19	0.526	507	544	0.932	
7	Maverick Hard Hitters	8	2	6	6	7	19	0.368	488	600	0.813	
8	Philippine Air Force Airmen	8	2	6	5	7	21	0.333	451	553	0.816	
9	RichMarc Sports 3B Elite Spikers	8	0	8	0	2	24	0.083	476	647	0.736	

Source: Spikers' Turf – Standings

=== Match results ===
- All times are Philippine Standard Time (UTC+08:00).

Date	Time	Venue		Score		Set 1	Set 2	Set 3	Set 4	Set 5	Total	Report
Mar 13	16:00	RMC	RichMarc Sports 3B Elite Spikers	1–3	Philippine Air Force Airmen	25–22	17–25	18–25	23–25		83–97	P2
Mar 13	18:00	RMC	PGJC-Navy Sea Lions	0–3	Cignal HD Spikers	17–25	16–25	25–27			58–77	P2
Mar 15	16:00	RMC	Maverick Hard Hitters	0–3	Criss Cross King Crunchers	8–25	22–25	11–25			41–75	P2
Mar 15	18:00	RMC	Savouge Spin Doctors	3–0	VNS-Nasty Griffins	26–24	25–18	25–17			76–59	P2
Mar 17	16:00	RMC	Philippine Air Force Airmen	0–3	PGJC-Navy Sea Lions	21–25	21–25	18–25			60–75	P2
Mar 17	18:00	RMC	Cignal HD Spikers	3–0	RichMarc Sports 3B Elite Spikers	25–15	25–20	25–16			75–51	P2
Mar 20	16:00	PSA	Maverick Hard Hitters	0–3	PGJC-Navy Sea Lions	20–25	11–25	20–25			51–75	P2
Mar 20	18:00	PSA	Cignal HD Spikers	3–0	Savouge Spin Doctors	25–15	27–25	25–23			77–63	P2
Mar 22	16:00	YSA	D' Navigators Iloilo	3–1	Philippine Air Force Airmen	25–23	25–21	17–25	25–19		92–88	P2
Mar 22	18:00	YSA	VNS-Nasty Griffins	0–3	Criss Cross King Crunchers	18–25	17–25	17–25			52–75	P2
Mar 24	16:00	PA	Savouge Spin Doctors	1–3	D' Navigators Iloilo	17–25	17–25	25–18	23–25		82–93	P2
Mar 24	18:00	PA	Criss Cross King Crunchers	3–0	RichMarc Sports 3B Elite Spikers	25–16	25–10	25–22			75–48	P2
Apr 3	16:00	YSA	D' Navigators Iloilo	3–0	Maverick Hard Hitters	25–16	25–18	25–17			75–51	P2
Apr 3	18:00	YSA	Philippine Air Force Airmen	0–3	Cignal HD Spikers	10–25	21–25	15–25			46–75	P2
Apr 5	16:00	YSA	RichMarc Sports 3B Elite Spikers	0–3	PGJC-Navy Sea Lions	19–25	12–25	22–25			53–75	P2
Apr 5	18:00	YSA	VNS-Nasty Griffins	0–3	D' Navigators Iloilo	20–25	23–25	24–26			67–76	P2
Apr 10	16:00	PA	PGJC-Navy Sea Lions	3–2	Savouge Spin Doctors	27–25	28–26	22–25	16–25	15–11	108–112	P2
Apr 10	18:00	PA	D' Navigators Iloilo	1–3	Criss Cross King Crunchers	20–25	25–20	30–32	14–25		89–102	P2
Apr 12	16:00	YSA	RichMarc Sports 3B Elite Spikers	0–3	VNS-Nasty Griffins	20–25	21–25	15–25			56–75	P2
Apr 12	18:00	YSA	Philippine Air Force Airmen	0–3	Maverick Hard Hitters	18–25	20–25	9–25			47–75	P2
Apr 14	14:00	PSA	Savouge Spin Doctors	3–0	Philippine Air Force Airmen	25–17	28–26	25–22			78–65	P2
Apr 14	16:00	PSA	VNS-Nasty Griffins	0–3	PGJC-Navy Sea Lions	14–25	16–25	21–25			51–75	P2
Apr 14	18:00	PSA	Criss Cross King Crunchers	2–3	Cignal HD Spikers	25–20	15–25	25–23	23–25	12–15	100–108	P2
Apr 17	16:00	YSA	Savouge Spin Doctors	3–0	RichMarc Sports 3B Elite Spikers	25–15	25–21	25–11			75–47	P2
Apr 17	18:00	YSA	Cignal HD Spikers	3–2	D' Navigators Iloilo	21–25	25–18	20–25	25–19	15–7	106–94	P2
Apr 19	16:00	YSA	PGJC-Navy Sea Lions	1–3	Criss Cross King Crunchers	25–19	20–25	21–25	19–25		85–94	P2
Apr 19	18:00	YSA	Maverick Hard Hitters	1–3	VNS-Nasty Griffins	25–22	21–25	11–25	15–25		72–97	P2
Apr 21	16:00	YSA	Maverick Hard Hitters	0–3	Savouge Spin Doctors	23–25	13–25	21–25			57–75	P2
Apr 21	18:00	YSA	Criss Cross King Crunchers	3–0	Philippine Air Force Airmen	25–17	25–16	25–15			75–48	P2
Apr 24	16:00	PA	D' Navigators Iloilo	3–0	RichMarc Sports 3B Elite Spikers	25–19	25–20	25–18			75–57	P2
Apr 24	18:00	PA	VNS-Nasty Griffins	2–3	Cignal HD Spikers	25–22	21–25	28–26	24–26	8–15	106–114	P2
Apr 26	14:00	YSA	Cignal HD Spikers	3–0	Maverick Hard Hitters	25–20	25–9	25–12			75–41	P2
Apr 26	16:00	YSA	Philippine Air Force Airmen	3–2	VNS-Nasty Griffins	29–27	15–25	23–25	25–21	15–13	107–111	P2
Apr 26	18:00	YSA	Criss Cross King Crunchers	3–1	Savouge Spin Doctors	25–15	25–19	31–33	25–19		106–86	P2
Apr 28	16:00	NAS	RichMarc Sports 3B Elite Spikers	1–3	Maverick Hard Hitters	21–25	13–25	27–25	20–25		81–100	P2
Apr 28	18:00	NAS	PGJC-Navy Sea Lions	3–2	D' Navigators Iloilo	25–19	22–25	25–20	19–25	15–10	106–99	P2

== Final round ==
- All times are Philippine Standard Time (UTC+8:00).

=== Semifinals ===
==== Ranking ====
Pos	Team	Pld	W	L	Pts	SW	SL	SR	SPW	SPL	SPR	Qualification
1	Cignal HD Spikers	3	2	1	7	8	3	2.667	263	223	1.179	Championship
2	Criss Cross King Crunchers	3	2	1	5	7	5	1.400	269	245	1.098	Championship
3	D' Navigators Iloilo	3	1	2	4	5	7	0.714	256	277	0.924	3rd place
4	PGJC-Navy Sea Lions	3	1	2	2	3	8	0.375	219	268	0.817	3rd place

Source: spikersturf.ph

==== Match results ====
Date	Time	Venue		Score		Set 1	Set 2	Set 3	Set 4	Set 5	Total	Report
May 1	16:00	RMC	Criss Cross King Crunchers	1–3	D' Navigators Iloilo	25–16	25–27	21–25	17–25		88–93	P2
May 1	18:00	RMC	Cignal HD Spikers	3–0	PGJC-Navy Sea Lions	25–16	29–27	25–22			79–65	P2
May 3	16:00	RMC	D' Navigators Iloilo	0–3	Cignal HD Spikers	14–25	21–25	17–25			52–75	P2
May 3	18:00	RMC	Criss Cross King Crunchers	3–0	PGJC-Navy Sea Lions	25–15	25–16	25–12			75–43	P2
May 5	10:00	RMC	PGJC-Navy Sea Lions	3–2	D' Navigators Iloilo	18–25	23–25	25–23	25–23	20–18	111–114	P2
May 5	12:00	RMC	Cignal HD Spikers	2–3	Criss Cross King Crunchers	25–18	25–21	22–25	22–25	15–17	109–106	P2

=== Finals ===
==== 3rd place ====
PGJC-Navy wins the series, 1–1, via points ratio of 1.049 vs. 0.953

Date	Time	Venue		Score		Set 1	Set 2	Set 3	Set 4	Set 5	Total	Report
May 8	16:00	RMC	D' Navigators Iloilo	1–3	PGJC-Navy Sea Lions	17–25	25–16	18–25	31–33		91–99	P2
May 10	16:00	RMC	PGJC-Navy Sea Lions	1–3	D' Navigators Iloilo	23–25	20–25	25–15	23–25		91–90	P2

==== Championship ====
Cignal wins series, 2–0

Date	Time	Venue		Score		Set 1	Set 2	Set 3	Set 4	Set 5	Total	Report
May 8	18:00	RMC	Cignal HD Spikers	3–1	Criss Cross King Crunchers	27–25	23–25	25–21	25–19		100–90	P2
May 10	18:00	RMC	Criss Cross King Crunchers	0–3	Cignal HD Spikers	23–25	25–27	21–25			69–77	P2

== Final standing ==
Rank	Team
1st place, gold medalist(s)	Cignal HD Spikers
2nd place, silver medalist(s)	Criss Cross King Crunchers
3rd place, bronze medalist(s)	PGJC-Navy Sea Lions
4	D' Navigators Iloilo
5	Savouge Spin Doctors
6	VNS-Nasty Griffins
7	Maverick Hard Hitters
8	Philippine Air Force Airmen
9	RichMarc Sports 3B Elite Spikers

2024 Spikers' Turf Open champions
Cignal HD Spikers
Fifth title

Team roster:
Sandy Domenick Montero, Alfred Gerald Valbuena, Giles Torres, Roniel Rosales, Mark Frederick Calado, Vince Patrick Lorenzo, John Paul Bugaoan (c), Madz Gampong, Wendel Concepcion Miguel, Joshua Umandal, Nestin Gwaza, Ruvince Abrot, Bryan Bagunas, Gabriel EJ Casaña, Kris Cian Silang, Lloyd Josafat
Head coach:
Dexter Clamor

== Awards ==
Award	Player	Team	Ref.
Conference Most Valuable Player	Jude Garcia	Criss Cross	
Finals Most Valuable Player	Bryan Bagunas	Cignal	
1st Best Outside Spiker	Joshua Umandal	Cignal	
2nd Best Outside Spiker	Greg Dolor	PGJC-Navy	
1st Best Middle Blocker	Peter Quiel	PGJC-Navy	
2nd Best Middle Blocker	Abdurasad Nursiddik	D' Navigators	
Best Opposite Spiker	Francis Saura	D' Navigators	
Best Setter	Kris Cian Silang	Cignal	
Best Libero	Jack Kalingking	PGJC-Navy	

== STPC player of the week ==
Week	Player	Team	Ref.
March 13–24	Jude Garcia	Criss Cross King Crunchers	
April 3–5	Francis Saura	D' Navigators Iloilo	
April 10–14	Bryan Bagunas	Cignal HD Spikers	
April 17–21	Joshua Umandal	Cignal HD Spikers	
April 24–28	Joeven Dela Vega	PGJC-Navy Sea Lions	
May 1–5	Marck Espejo	Criss Cross King Crunchers	

== See also ==
- 2024 Premier Volleyball League All-Filipino Conference
