= Vince Lorenzo =

Filipino volleyball player (born 1999)

Personal information
- Full name: Vince Patrick Lorenzo
- Nationality: Filipino
- Education: Far Eastern University
- Height: 1.74 m (5 ft 9 in)
- Weight: July 11, 1999 (age 27)

Volleyball information
- Position: Libero
- Current club: Savouge Spin Doctors

Career
- Years: Team
- 2022–2023: AMC Cotabato Spikers
- 2023–2024: D' Navigators Iloilo
- 2023–2025: Cignal HD Spikers
- 2026: AEP Cabstars
- 2026–present: Savouge Spin Doctors

National team
- Years: Team
- 2023–present: Philippines

Vince Patrick Lorenzo (born July 11, 1999) is a Filipino volleyball player. He played with FEU Tamaraws collegiate men's collegiate volleyball team. He is currently playing for the Savouge Spin Doctors in the Spikers' Turf.

== Career ==
=== Collegiate ===
Lorenzo made his first game game appearance with the FEU Tamaraws in UAAP Season 81 where they got an 11–3 win-loss record in the preliminary round. They won against Ateneo Blue Eagles in the semis but they lost against NU Bulldogs in the finals.

In UAAP Season 82, they got 2–0 win-loss record in the first two games but later on, the tournament was cancelled due to the COVID-19 pandemic.

== Clubs ==
- (Philippines) AMC Cotabato Spikers (2022–2023)
- (Philippines) D' Navigators Iloilo (2023–2024)
- (Philippines) Cignal HD Spikers (2024–2025)
- (Philippines) AEP Cabstars (2026)
- (Philippines) Savouge Spin Doctors (2026–present)

== Awards ==
=== Individual ===
Year	League	Season/Conference	Award	Ref
2024	Spikers' Turf	Invitational	Best Libero	
2025	Spikers' Turf	Open	Best Libero	

=== Collegiate ===
Year	League	Season	Title	Ref
2019	UAAP	81	Runner-up	

=== Clubs ===
Year	League	Season/Conference	Club	Title	Ref
2022	PNVF	Champions League	Pikit-North Cotabato G-Spikers/AMC Cotabato Spikers	Runner-up	
2023	Spikers' Turf	Open	Pikit-North Cotabato G-Spikers/AMC Cotabato Spikers	Runner-up	
2024	PNVF	Champions League	Cignal HD Spikers	Champions	
2024	Spikers' Turf	Open	Cignal HD Spikers	Champions	
2024	Spikers' Turf	Invitational	Cignal HD Spikers	Champions	
2025	Spikers' Turf	Open	Cignal HD Spikers	Champions	
