= 2025 Spikers' Turf Open Conference =

First Conference of the 2025 SPT season

- Duration: February 21 – April 6, 2025
- Matches: 41
- Teams: 6
- Attendance: 11,248 (274 per match)
- TV partner(s): One Sports; One Sports+ Pilipinas Live

Results
- Champions: Cignal HD Spikers
- Runners-up: Criss Cross King Crunchers
- Third place: Savouge Spin Doctors
- Fourth place: VNS-Laticrete Griffins

Awards
- Conference MVP: Jude Garcia
- Finals MVP: Steven Rotter
- Best OH: Mark Calado; Sherwin Caritativo
- Best MB: John Paul Bugaoan; Gian Glorioso
- Best OPP: Steven Rotter
- Best Setter: Ish Polvorosa
- Best Libero: Vince Lorenzo

Spikers' Turf Open Conference chronology
- < 2024 2026 >

Spikers' Turf conference chronology
- < 2024 Invitational 2025 Invitational >

The 2025 Spikers' Turf Open Conference was the third and final conference of the 2024–25 season of Spikers' Turf. Six teams battled for the championship, one of which is a debutant team—the Alpha Insurance Protectors.

Due to organizers Sports Vision realigning its leagues' calendars to match the FIVB calendar, this conference became part of an extended 2024–25 season.

== Participating teams ==
2025 Spikers' Turf Open Conference
Abbr.	Team	Affiliation	Head coach	Team captain
ALP	Alpha Insurance Protectors	Alpha Insurance & Surety Company Inc.	(Philippines) Mike Santos	Edward Camposano
CHD	Cignal HD Spikers	Cignal TV, Inc.	(Philippines) Dexter Clamor	John Paul Bugaoan
CKC	Criss Cross King Crunchers	Republic Biscuit Corporation	(Thailand) Tai Bundit	Ysay Marasigan
PJN	PGJC-Navy Sea Lions	Philippine Navy	(Philippines) George Pascua	Greg Dolor
SVG	Savouge Spin Doctors	Savouge Aesthetics Philippines	(Philippines) Sydney Calderon	Hero Austria
VNS	VNS-Laticrete Griffins	VNS Management Group	(Philippines) Ralph Raymund Ocampo	Charles Jordan Segui

== Venues ==
The following are the game venues set for this conference:

Preliminaries	Preliminaries, Semifinals
San Juan	Pasig
Filoil EcoOil Centre	Ynares Sports Arena
Capacity: 6,000	Capacity: 3,000
Preliminaries, Semifinals, Finals	Finals
Manila	Pasig
Rizal Memorial Coliseum	PhilSports Arena
Capacity: 6,100	Capacity: 10,000

== Format ==
Preliminary round

1. The six teams are competing in a double round-robin elimination.
2. Teams are ranked using the FIVB Ranking System.
3. Top four teams advance to the semifinals.

Semifinals

1. The four semifinalists will compete in a single round-robin elimination.
2. Teams are ranked using the FIVB Ranking System.
3. The third and fourth-ranked teams will be relegated to the 3rd place series.
4. The first and second-ranked teams will advance to the championship series.

Finals

1. Best-of-three series.
2. Bronze medal: SF Ranked 3 vs. SF Ranked 4
3. Gold medal: SF Ranked 1 vs. SF Ranked 2

== Pool standing procedure ==
- First, teams are ranked by the number of matches won.
- If the number of matches won is tied, the tied teams are then ranked by match points, wherein:
  - Match won 3–0 or 3–1: 3 match points for the winner, 0 match points for the loser.
  - Match won 3–2: 2 match points for the winner, 1 match point for the loser.
- In case of any further ties, the following criteria shall be used:
1. Set ratio: number of sets won divided by number of sets lost.
2. Setpoint ratio: number of points scored divided by number of points allowed.
3. Head-to-head standings: any remaining tied teams are ranked based on the results of head-to-head matches involving the teams in question.

== Preliminary round ==
=== Ranking ===
Pos	Team	Pld	W	L	Pts	SW	SL	SR	SPW	SPL	SPR	Qualification
1	Criss Cross King Crunchers	10	10	0	28	30	6	5.000	863	660	1.308	Final round
2	Cignal HD Spikers	10	8	2	23	25	10	2.500	820	722	1.136	Final round
3	Savouge Spin Doctors	10	6	4	20	24	14	1.714	846	801	1.056	Final round
4	VNS-Laticrete Griffins	10	3	7	10	11	23	0.478	689	800	0.861	Final round
5	Alpha Insurance Protectors	10	2	8	7	11	24	0.458	730	816	0.895	
6	PGJC-Navy Sea Lions	10	1	9	2	5	29	0.172	668	827	0.808	

Source: Spikers' Turf – Standings

=== Match results ===
- All times are Philippine Standard Time (UTC+08:00).

Date	Time	Venue		Score		Set 1	Set 2	Set 3	Set 4	Set 5	Total	Report
First round
Feb 21	13:00	YSA	PGJC-Navy Sea Lions	0–3	Savouge Spin Doctors	23–25	20–25	13–25			56–75	P2
Feb 21	15:30	YSA	Alpha Insurance Protectors	0–3	Cignal HD Spikers	15–25	16–25	23–25			54–75	P2
Feb 21	18:00	YSA	VNS-Laticrete Griffins	0–3	Criss Cross King Crunchers	19–25	12–25	22–25			53–75	P2
Feb 23	13:00	RMC	PGJC-Navy Sea Lions	3–2	VNS-Laticrete Griffins	25–20	25–22	20–25	17–25	17–15	104–107	P2
Feb 23	15:30	RMC	Cignal HD Spikers	3–0	Savouge Spin Doctors	25–23	27–25	25–19			77–67	P2
Feb 23	18:00	RMC	Criss Cross King Crunchers	3–0	Alpha Insurance Protectors	25–21	25–19	25–21			75–61	P2
Feb 26	13:00	YSA	Alpha Insurance Protectors	2–3	Savouge Spin Doctors	23–25	23–25	25–20	25–20	13–15	109–105	P2
Feb 26	15:30	YSA	PGJC-Navy Sea Lions	1–3	Criss Cross King Crunchers	17–25	27–25	20–25	20–25		84–100	P2
Feb 26	18:00	YSA	VNS-Laticrete Griffins	0–3	Cignal HD Spikers	21–25	13–25	19–25			53–75	P2
Mar 02	13:00	RMC	Cignal HD Spikers	3–1	PGJC-Navy Sea Lions	19–25	25–17	25–17	25–17		94–76	P2
Mar 02	15:30	RMC	Alpha Insurance Protectors	1–3	VNS-Laticrete Griffins	21–25	23–25	25–19	23–25		92–94	P2
Mar 02	18:00	RMC	Criss Cross King Crunchers	3–2	Savouge Spin Doctors	22–25	25–15	23–25	25–18	15–7	110–90	P2
Mar 05	13:00	FEC	Savouge Spin Doctors	3–0	VNS-Laticrete Griffins	25–16	25–20	25–23			75–59	P2
Mar 05	15:30	FEC	PGJC-Navy Sea Lions	0–3	Alpha Insurance Protectors	21–25	24–26	19–25			64–76	P2
Mar 05	18:00	FEC	Cignal HD Spikers	0–3	Criss Cross King Crunchers	23–25	21–25	17–25			61–75	P2
Second round
Mar 09	13:00	YSA	Criss Cross King Crunchers	3–0	Alpha Insurance Protectors	25–10	25–12	25–11			75–33	P2
Mar 09	15:30	YSA	VNS-Laticrete Griffins	0–3	Cignal HD Spikers	16–25	15–25	24–26			55–76	P2
Mar 09	18:00	YSA	Savouge Spin Doctors	3–0	PGJC-Navy Sea Lions	25–18	25–14	25–21			75–53	P2
Mar 12	13:00	YSA	PGJC-Navy Sea Lions	0–3	Alpha Insurance Protectors	23–25	21–25	23–25			67–75	P2
Mar 12	15:30	YSA	Criss Cross King Crunchers	3–0	VNS-Laticrete Griffins	25–12	25–18	25–22			75–52	P2
Mar 12	18:00	YSA	Cignal HD Spikers	3–2	Savouge Spin Doctors	27–25	20–25	28–30	25–22	15–13	115–115	P2
Mar 14	13:00	FEC	Savouge Spin Doctors	3–0	Alpha Insurance Protectors	25–12	25–21	25–21			75–54	P2
Mar 14	15:30	FEC	VNS-Laticrete Griffins	3–0	PGJC-Navy Sea Lions	25–23	25–19	25–19			75–61	P2
Mar 14	18:00	FEC	Criss Cross King Crunchers	3–1	Cignal HD Spikers	19–25	25–14	25–20	25–19		94–78	P2
Mar 16	13:00	YSA	Alpha Insurance Protectors	1–3	VNS-Laticrete Griffins	25–17	22–25	23–25	22–25		92–92	P2
Mar 16	15:30	YSA	Cignal HD Spikers	3–0	PGJC-Navy Sea Lions	25–19	25–15	25–15			75–49	P2
Mar 16	18:00	YSA	Savouge Spin Doctors	2–3	Criss Cross King Crunchers	25–20	13–25	26–24	19–25	11–15	94–109	P2
Mar 19	13:00	RMC	Alpha Insurance Protectors	1–3	Cignal HD Spikers	19–25	20–25	25–19	20–25		84–94	P2
Mar 19	15:30	RMC	Criss Cross King Crunchers	3–0	PGJC-Navy Sea Lions	25–18	25–17	25–19			75–54	P2
Mar 19	18:00	RMC	VNS-Laticrete Griffins	0–3	Savouge Spin Doctors	19–25	18–25	22–25			59–75	P2

== Final round ==
- All times are Philippine Standard Time (UTC+8:00).

=== Semifinals ===
==== Ranking ====
Pos	Team	Pld	W	L	Pts	SW	SL	SR	SPW	SPL	SPR	Qualification
1	Criss Cross King Crunchers	3	3	0	9	9	1	9.000	251	197	1.274	Championship match
2	Cignal HD Spikers	3	2	1	6	7	3	2.333	243	203	1.197	Championship match
3	Savouge Spin Doctors	3	1	2	3	3	7	0.429	217	235	0.923	3rd place match
4	VNS-Laticrete Griffins	3	0	3	0	1	9	0.111	176	252	0.698	3rd place match

Source: Spikers' Turf – Standings

==== Match results ====
Date	Time	Venue		Score		Set 1	Set 2	Set 3	Set 4	Set 5	Total	Report
Mar 23	15:30	YSA	Criss Cross King Crunchers	3–0	Savouge Spin Doctors	25–22	25–18	25–18			75–58	P2
Mar 23	18:00	YSA	VNS-Laticrete Griffins	0–3	Cignal HD Spikers	13–25	16–25	16–25			45–75	P2
Mar 26	15:30	RMC	Criss Cross King Crunchers	3–0	VNS-Laticrete Griffins	25–20	25–15	25–11			75–46	P2
Mar 26	18:00	RMC	Savouge Spin Doctors	0–3	Cignal HD Spikers	19–25	20–25	18–25			57–75	P2
Mar 30	15:30	RMC	VNS-Laticrete Griffins	1–3	Savouge Spin Doctors	26–24	14–25	19–25	26–28		85–102	P2
Mar 30	18:00	RMC	Cignal HD Spikers	1–3	Criss Cross King Crunchers	27–25	21–25	21–25	24–26		93–101	P2

=== Finals ===
==== 3rd place ====
Savouge wins series, 2–0

Date	Time	Venue		Score		Set 1	Set 2	Set 3	Set 4	Set 5	Total	Report
Apr 02	15:30	RMC	Savouge Spin Doctors	3–1	VNS-Laticrete Griffins	21–25	25–15	26–24	25–22		97–86	P2
Apr 04	15:30	PSA	VNS-Laticrete Griffins	0–3	Savouge Spin Doctors	19–25	23–25	22–25			64–75	P2

==== Championship ====
Cignal wins series, 2–1

Date	Time	Venue		Score		Set 1	Set 2	Set 3	Set 4	Set 5	Total	Report
Apr 02	18:30	RMC	Criss Cross King Crunchers	2–3	Cignal HD Spikers	25–22	19–25	25–22	21–25	12–15	102–109	P2
Apr 04	18:30	PSA	Cignal HD Spikers	2–3	Criss Cross King Crunchers	20–25	15–25	25–18	25–23	12–15	97–106	P2
Apr 06	16:00	PSA	Criss Cross King Crunchers	0–3	Cignal HD Spikers	22–25	16–25	26–28			64–78	P2

== Final standing ==
Rank	Team
1st place, gold medalist(s)	Cignal HD Spikers
2nd place, silver medalist(s)	Criss Cross King Crunchers
3rd place, bronze medalist(s)	Savouge Spin Doctors
4	VNS-Laticrete Griffins
5	Alpha Insurance Protectors
6	PGJC-Navy Sea Lions

2025 Spikers' Turf Open champions
Cignal HD Spikers
Seventh title

Team roster:
Sandy Domenick Montero, Alfred Gerald Valbuena, Joshua Retamar, Steven Rotter, Bryan Bagunas, Vince Patrick Lorenzo, John Paul Bugaoan (c), Wendel Concepcion Miguel, Joshua Umandal, Nestin Gwaza, Ruvince Abrot, Martin Bugaoan, John Mark Ronquillo, Gabriel EJ Casaña, Kris Cian Silang, Lloyd Josafat, Louie Ramirez
Head coach:
Dexter Clamor

== Awards ==
Award	Player	Team	Ref.
Conference Most Valuable Player	Jude Garcia	Criss Cross	
Finals Most Valuable Player	Steven Rotter	Cignal	
1st Best Outside Spiker	Mark Calado	Savouge	
2nd Best Outside Spiker	Sherwin Caritativo	Savouge	
1st Best Middle Blocker	John Paul Bugaoan	Cignal	
2nd Best Middle Blocker	Gian Carlo Glorioso	Criss Cross	
Best Opposite Spiker	Steven Rotter	Cignal	
Best Setter	Ish Polvorosa	Criss Cross	
Best Libero	Vince Lorenzo	Cignal	

== STPC Player of the Week ==
Week	Player	Team	Ref.
February 21–23	Joshua Umandal	Cignal HD Spikers	
February 26–March 2	Steve Rotter	Cignal HD Spikers	
March 5–9	Ish Polvorosa	Criss Cross King Crunchers	
March 12–16	Jaron Requinton	Criss Cross King Crunchers	
March 19–23	Jude Garcia	Criss Cross King Crunchers	
March 26–30	Ish Polvorosa	Criss Cross King Crunchers	

== See also ==
- 2024–25 Premier Volleyball League All-Filipino Conference
