= Martelli Meats Master Butchers =

Philippine men's volleyball club

Martelli Meats Masters Butcher
- Head coach: Michael Conde
- Captain: Jerome Michael Cordez
- League: Spikers' Turf
- 2024 Invitational: 10th place

The Martelli Meats Master Butchers were a Philippine men's volleyball team that competed in Spikers' Turf in 2024.

== History ==
The Hitters debuted at the Spikers' Turf in the 2024 Open Conference. For the next tournament, the 2024 Invitational Conference, the club changed their name to the Martelli Meats Master Butchers.

== Current roster ==
Martelli Meats Master Butchers
Number	Player	Position	School
1	Jerome Michael Cordez (C)	Outside Hitter	
2	Karl Justin Honrado	Opposite Hitter	
3	Andrei Miguel Bundoc	Outside Hitter	
4	Renz Jonas Cruz	Middle Blocker	
5	Lorenz Calayag	Middle Blocker	
6	Kenrod Benedict Umali	Outside Hitter	
8	Ricardo Alfaro	Libero	
9	Stephen Jason Sundiang	Libero	
11	Razzel Palisoc	Opposite Hitter	
12	Wilbert Cebrero	Setter	
14	Carlo Isidro	Libero	
15	Joaquin Clemen Tubog	Setter	
17	Jay Sequitin	Middle Blocker	
18	Angelo Reyes	Middle Blocker	
22	Romeo Deodones	Outside Hitter	
23	France Lander Racaza	Outside Hitter	

- Head coach: Michael Ian Conde
- Assistant coach: Michael Palermo

== Honors ==
=== Team ===
Spikers' Turf:

Season	Conference	Title	Source
2024	Open	7th place	
2024	Invitational	10th place	

== Team captains ==
- (Philippines) Razzel Palisoc (2024)
- (Philippines) Jerome Michael Cordez (2024)

== Coaches ==
- (Philippines) Erickson Ramos (2024)
- (Philippines) Michael Ian Conde (2024)
