= Steve Rotter =

Filipino American volleyball player (born 1998)

Personal information
- Full name: Steven Charles Rotter
- Nationality: United States (Note: Sporting nationality – not to be confused with citizenship status. Rotter is affiliated with USA Volleyball as per the FIVB Player Database.)
- Born: April 16, 1998 (age 28) Los Angeles, U.S.
- Home town: La Palma, California
- Education: Long Beach City College (2017–2018); California State University, Northridge (2020–2021)
- Height: 1.98 m (6 ft 6 in)

Volleyball information
- Position: Opposite hitter

Career
- Years: Team
- 2023: AMC Cotabato Spikers
- 2024–2025: Cignal HD Spikers

Steven Charles Rotter (born April 16, 1998) is a Filipino American volleyball player who last played for Cignal HD Spikers in the Spikers' Turf.

== Early life and education ==
Steve Rotter was born on April 16, 1998 to Charles and Maria Rotter. He was born in Los Angeles although La Palma, California is his hometown. He attended St. John Bosco High School graduating in 2016. For his college education, Rotter studied at Long Beach City College from 2017 to 2018 before transferring to California State University, Northridge in 2019.

== Career ==
=== College ===
Rotter played for Long Beach City College's volleyball team for two seasons from 2017 to 2018. He was named as part of the First Team All-Western State Conference and was recognized as the Western State Conference Most Valuable Player in his final year. He was also included in the All-Tournament Team for the California Community College Athletic Association in 2018.

Rotter would move to California State University, Northridge and join its team. He had to redshirt for his first year at Cal State before debuting for his new college on his second year. He was able to play in the US NCAA Division I.

=== Club ===
Rotter later play club volleyball in the Philippines. He played for AMC Cotabato Spikers in the 2023 Open Conference of Spikers' Turf.

Rotter moved to the Cignal HD Spikers in 2024, helping the team win the 2024 Invitational and 2025 Open Conferences; he also claimed the Best Opposite Spiker and Finals MVP recognition in the latter. However, Cignal missed the finals in the 2025 Invitational Conference and finished third. Cignal announced his departure from the club on January 1, 2026.

=== National team ===
Rotter was included to the Philippines men's national volleyball team pool through try-outs held by Fil-Am Nation in California. He was included in the squad that played in the 2023 Southeast Asian Games in Cambodia. The team did not medal.

He also played in the 2023 Asian Men's Volleyball Challenge Cup in Taipei and the first leg of the 2023 SEA V.League. He was named best opposite hitter in the latter.

Rotter was omitted from the final 14-man Philippines squad for the 2025 FIVB Men's Volleyball World Championship due to him still being affiliated with USA Volleyball.

== Clubs ==
- (Philippines) AMC Cotabato Spikers (2023)
- (Philippines) Cignal HD Spikers (2024–2025)

== Awards ==
=== Individual ===
Season	Tournament	Title	Ref
2025	2025 Spikers' Turf Open Conference	Most Valuable Player (Finals)	
2025	2025 Spikers' Turf Open Conference	Best Opposite Spiker	

=== Clubs ===
Season	Tournament	Club team	Title	Ref
2024	Spikers' Turf Invitational	Cignal HD Spikers	Champions	
2025	Spikers' Turf Open	Cignal HD Spikers	Champions	
