= Jan Berlin Paglinawan =

Filipino volleyball player (born 1993)

Personal information
- Nationality: Filipino
- Born: November 1, 1993 (age 32)
- Height: 1.88 m (6 ft 2 in)
- Education: National University

Volleyball information
- Position: Outside Hitter; Opposite Hitter
- Current club: Retired

Jan Berlin Paglinawan (born November 1, 1993) is a former Filipino volleyball player. He played with NU Bulldogs collegiate men's University team. He last played for the Vice Co. Blockbusters in the Spikers' Turf.

== Career ==
=== Collegiate ===
Paglinawan made his first game appearance with the NU Bulldogs in the UAAP Season 71 where they placed 8th.

In UAAP Season 72 and UAAP Season 73, they were placed 7th.

In UAAP Season 74, they failed to advanced in the Semis after being placed 5th.

In UAAP Season 75, they won the first championship of NU Bulldogs in the UAAP volleyball after defeating FEU Tamaraws in the finals.

== Clubs ==
- (Philippines) Champion Supra Smashers/Sta. Elena Ball Hammers (2015–2017)
- (Philippines) Vice Co. Blockbusters (2018)

== Awards ==
=== Collegiate ===
Year	UAAP Season	Title	Ref
2013	75	Champions	
2014	76	Champions	
2015	77	Runner-up	

=== Clubs ===
Year	League	Conference	Club	Title	Ref
2016	Spikers' Turf	Open	Champion Supra Smashers	3rd Place	
2016	Spikers' Turf	Reinforced	Champion Supra Smashers	3rd Place	
2018	Spikers' Turf	Open	Vice Co. Blockbusters	3rd place	
