= Louie Ramirez (volleyball) =

Filipino volleyball player (born 2000)

Personal information
- Nationality: Filipino
- Born: April 14, 2000 (age 26) Dasol, Pangasinan, Philippines
- Education: University of Perpetual Help System Dalta
- Height: 1.9 m (6 ft 3 in)

Volleyball information
- Position: Outside Hitter; Opposite Hitter
- Current team: Savouge Spin Doctors

Career
- Years: Team
- 2022: Cignal HD Spikers
- 2023: Imus City-AJAA Spikers
- 2024–2025: Cignal HD Spikers
- 2026–: Savouge Spin Doctors

National team
- Years: Team
- 2024–: Philippines

Louie Ramirez (born April 14, 2000) is a Filipino volleyball player. He played as an Outside Hitter and Opposite Hitter for the Perpetual Altas in the NCAA. He is currently playing for Savouge Spin Doctors in the Spikers' Turf.

== Education ==
Ramirez attended the University of Perpetual Help System Dalta where he graduated with a bachelor's degree in hospitality management in 2025.

== Career ==
=== Collegiate ===
Ramirez made his first game appearance with the Perpetual Altas in the NCAA Season 94 where his team won the title against Benilde Blazers.

In NCAA Season 95, that was his second year playing in Perpetual Altas but due to the pandemic the tournament was cancelled.

In NCAA Season 98, the men's volleyball tournament of the NCAA came back after the pandemic. The Perpetual Altas claimed their 3-peat championship title. Ramirez was also awarded Season's MVP on that year.

=== Club ===
Ramirez played for Cignal HD Spikers of the Spikers' Turf at the 2022 Open Conference.

In August 2023, Ramirez was invited by the Japanese club Oita Miyoshi Weisse Adler for a 3-week training program. He did not make it into the roster.

Ramirez rejoined Cignal in June 2024. He later joined Savouge Spin Doctors in February 2026.

=== National team ===
Ramirez has played for the Philippines national team. He debuted for the team at the 2024 SEA Men's V.League. He played at the 2025 Alas Pilipinas Invitationals and was part of the final squad of the Philippines for the 2025 FIVB Men's Volleyball World Championship which the country hosted.

== Clubs ==
- (Philippines) Cignal HD Spikers (2022)
- (Philippines) Imus City-AJAA Spikers (2023)
- (Philippines) Cignal HD Spikers (2024–2025)
- (Philippines) Savouge Spin Doctors (2026–present)

== Awards ==
=== Individual ===
Year	League	Season/Conference	Award	Ref
2023	NCAA	98	MVP (Season)	
2023	NCAA	98	MVP (Finals)	
2024	NCAA	99	MVP (Season)	
2024	NCAA	99	2nd Best Outside Spiker	
2024	Spikers' Turf	Invitational	MVP (Finals)	

=== Collegiate ===
Year	League	Season/Conference	Title	Ref
2019	NCAA	94	Champions	
2022	V-League	Collegiate	3rd place	
2023	NCAA	98	Champions	
2024	NCAA	99	Champions	

=== Clubs ===
Year	League	Season/Conference	Club	Title	Ref
2022	Spikers' Turf	Open	Cignal HD Spikers	Runner-up	
2023	Spikers' Turf	Open	Imus City-AJAA Spikers	3rd place	
2024	Spikers' Turf	Invitational	Cignal HD Spikers	Champions	
2025	Spikers' Turf	Open	Cignal HD Spikers	Champions	
