= PVL Press Corps Awards Night =

Annual volleyball awards show

- Current: 2026 PVL Press Corps Awards Night
- Awarded for: Premier Volleyball League and Spikers' Turf
- Country: Philippines
- Presented by: ArenaPlus, Pilipinas Live, and PVL Press Corps

The PVL Press Corps Awards Night is the annual awards show of the Premier Volleyball League (PVL) and Spikers' Turf presented by the PVL Press Corps, a group of print and online media personnel who covers the league. The second edition was held on May 30, 2026, at the Novotel Manila Araneta City in Quezon City.

== Background ==
On April 16, 2025, the Premier Volleyball League announced that it will collaborate its press corps to present awards through a new event. Unlike the league awards which are given in each conference, the PVL Press Corps awards are based on annual performance throughout multiple conferences combined with voting from team representatives and the press corps. Alongside the PVL, the men's Spikers' Turf would also have its own set of annual awards.

The first event was held on May 28 at Novotel Manila Araneta City in Quezon City.

== Editions ==
Year (Edition)	Date	Venue	Ref.
2025 (1st)	May 28, 2025	Novotel Manila Araneta City	
2026 (2nd)	May 30, 2026	Novotel Manila Araneta City	

== See also ==
- List of Premier Volleyball League award recipients
- List of Spikers' Turf award recipients
