= Peter Quiel =

Filipino volleyball player (born 1997)

Personal information
- Full name: Peter John Baltazar Quiel
- Nationality: Filipino
- Height: 1.92 m (6 ft 4 in)
- Weight: October 31, 1997 (age 28)
- Education: Far Eastern University

Volleyball information
- Position: Middle Blocker
- Number: 15

National team
2017	Philippines

Peter John Baltazar Quiel (born October 31, 1997) is a Filipino volleyball player. He played with the FEU Tamaraws collegiate men's collegiate volleyball team. He last played for the PGJC-Navy he Sea Lions in the Spikers' Turf.

== Career ==
=== Collegiate ===
Quiel made his first game appearance with the FEU Tamaraws is in UAAP Season 78 where they failed to advance in the Semis after being placed in 5th.

In UAAP Season 79 t79, FEU Tamaraws gets back onto the Semis after 2 years of final four appearance drought. They failed to reach the finals after being defeated by NU Bulldogs in the stepladder semifinals.

In UAAP Season 80, they succeeded to getting their final four appearance after being ranked at No. 2 in the preliminary round. They failed to reach the finals after losing against Ateneo in the semis.

In UAAP Season 81, they got an 11–3 win-loss record in the preliminary round. They won against Ateneo Blue Eagles in the semis but they lost against NU Bulldogs in the finals.

In UAAP Season 82, they got a 2–0 win-loss record in the first two games, but later on, the tournament was cancelled due to the COVID-19 pandemic.

== Clubs ==
- (Philippines) Vice Co. Blockbusters (2018)
- (Philippines) PLDT Ultra Fast Hitters (2019)
- (Philippines) PGJC-Navy Sea Lions (2022–2023, 2025–present)

== Awards ==
=== Clubs ===
Spikers' Turf

Year	Conference	Clubs	Title	Ref				
Year	Conference	Clubs	Title	Ref	2018	Open	Vice Co. Blockbusters	3rd place
2022	Open	PGJC–Navy Sea Lions	3rd place					
2024	Open	PGJC–Navy Sea Lions	3rd place					
