= Rikko Marmeto =

Filipino volleyball player (born 1996)

Personal information
- Full name: Rikko Marius Marmeto
- Nationality: Filipino
- Born: October 21, 1996 (age 30)
- Height: 1.63 m (5 ft 4 in)
- Education: Far Eastern University

Volleyball information
- Position: Libero
- Current club: Savouge Spin Doctors

Career
Years	Teams
2018	Vice Co. Blockbusters
2018	Cignal HD Spikers
2019–2021	Philippine Air Force Air Spikers
2023	Imus City-AJAA Spikers
2023	Sta. Rosa City Lions
2025–present	Savouge Spin Doctors

Rikko Marius Marmeto (born October 12, 1996) is a Filipino beach and indoor volleyball player. He played with FEU Tamaraws collegiate men's University team. He last played for the Savouge Spin Doctors in the Spikers' Turf.

== Career ==
=== Collegiate ===
Marmeto made his first game appearance with the FEU Tamaraws is in UAAP Season 76, where they placed in 3rd after being defeated by Ateneo in the Semis.

In UAAP Season 77 and UAAP Season 78 they failed to advance in the Semis after being placed in 5th.

In UAAP Season 79, the FEU Tamaraws gets back onto the Semis after 2 years of final four appearance drought. They failed to reach the finals after being defeated by NU Bulldogs in the stepladder semifinals.

In UAAP Season 80, it was the last playing year of Rikko Marmeto in the UAAP. They succeeded to get their final four appearance after being ranked at No. 2 in the preliminary round. They failed to reach the finals after being loss against Ateneo in the Semis.

== Clubs ==
- (Philippines) Vice Co. Blockbusters (2018)
- (Philippines) Cignal HD Spikers (2018)
- (Philippines) Philippine Air Force Air Spikers (2019–2021)
- (Philippines) Imus City-AJAA Spikers (2023)
- (Philippines) Sta. Rosa City Lions (2023)
- (Philippines) Savouge Spin Doctors (2025–present)

== Awards ==
=== Individual ===
Year	League	Season/Conference	Award	Ref
2016	UAAP	78	Best Libero	
2017	UAAP	79	Best Libero	
2018	UAAP	80	Best Libero	

=== Collegiate ===
Year	League	Season/Conference	Title	Ref
2014	UAAP	76	3rd place	
2017	UAAP	79	3rd place	
2018	UAAP	80	3rd place	

=== Clubs ===
Year	League	Season/Conference	Club	Title	Ref
2018	Spikers' Turf	Open	Cignal HD Spikers	3rd place	
2019	Spikers' Turf	Reinforced	Philippine Air Force Air Spikers	Runner-up	
2019	Spikers' Turf	Open	Philippine Air Force Air Spikers	Runner-up	
2021	PNVF	Challenge Cup	Go for Gold-Air Force Aguilas	Runner-up	
2023	Spikers' Turf	Open	Imus City–AJAA Spikers	3rd place	
