= John Paul Bugaoan =

Filipino volleyball player (born 1999)

Personal information
- Nationality: Filipino
- Born: January 8, 1999 (age 27) Makati, Philippines
- Education: Far Eastern University
- Height: 6 ft 3 in (1.91 m)

Volleyball information
- Position: Middle Blocker
- Current club: Savouge Spin Doctors

Career
- Years: Team
- 2018: Vice Co. Blockbusters
- 2019–2025: Cignal HD Spikers
- 2026–: Savouge Spin Doctors

National team
- Years: Team
- 2021: Philippines

John Paul Bugaoan (born January 8, 1999) is a Filipino volleyball player. He played with FEU Tamaraws collegiate men's University team. He is currently playing for the Savouge Spin Doctors in the Spikers' Turf.

== Early life ==
John Paul Bugaoan was born on January 8, 1999, in Makati, Philippines.

== Career ==
Bugaoan was a member of the FEU Tamaraws men's varsity team.

In 2018, he played for the Vice Co. Blockbusters in the 2018 Premier Volleyball League Reinforced Conference where they finished bronze. Bugaoan was named 2nd Best Middle Blocker.

In 2019, Bugaoan was signed by the Cignal HD Spikers. He joined Savouge Spin Doctors in February 2026.

In 2022, he became a part of the Philippines men's national volleyball team that played in the 31st Southeast Asian Games in Vietnam.

== Clubs ==
- (Philippines) Vice Co. Blockbusters (2018)
- (Philippines) Cignal HD Spikers (2019–2025)
- (Philippines) Savouge Spin Doctors (2026–present)

== Awards ==
=== Individual ===
Year	League	Season/Conference	Award	Ref
2017	UAAP	79	Best Blocker	
2017	PVL	Collegiate	1st Best Middle Blocker	
2018	PVL	Reinforced	2nd Best Middle Blocker	
2018	PVL	Collegiate	1st Best Middle Blocker	
2019	UAAP	81	1st Best Middle Blocker	
2022	Spikers' Turf	Open	2nd Best Middle Blocker	
2022	PNVF	Champions League	1st Best Middle Blocker	
2023	Spikers' Turf	Open	1st Best Middle Blocker	
2023	PNVF	Challenge Cup	1st Best Middle Blocker	
2023	Spikers' Turf	Invitational	1st Best Middle Blocker	
2025	Spikers' Turf	Open	1st Best Middle Blocker	

=== Collegiate ===
Year	League	Season/Conference	Title	Ref
2017	UAAP	79	3rd place	
2017	PVL	Collegiate	Runners-up	
2018	UAAP	80	3rd place	
2018	PVL	Collegiate	3rd place	
2019	UAAP	81	Runner-up	

=== Clubs ===
Year	League	Season/Conference	Club	Title	Ref
2018	Spikers' Turf	Open	Vice Co. Blockbusters	3rd place	
2019	Spikers' Turf	Reinforced	Cignal HD Spikers	Champions	
2019	Spikers' Turf	Open	Cignal HD Spikers	Champions	
2022	Spikers' Turf	Open	Cignal HD Spikers	Runner-up	
2022	PNVF	Champions League	Cignal HD Spikers	Champions	
2023	Spikers' Turf	Open	Cignal HD Spikers	Champions	
2023	Spikers' Turf	Invitational	Cignal HD Spikers	Runner-up	
2023	PNVF	Challenge Cup	Cignal HD Spikers	Runner-up	
2024	Spikers' Turf	Open	Cignal HD Spikers	Champions	
2024	Spikers' Turf	Invitational	Cignal HD Spikers	Champions	
2025	Spikers' Turf	Open	Cignal HD Spikers	Champions	
