= Jack Kalingking =

Filipino volleyball player (born 1996)

Personal information
- Nationality: Filipino
- Born: March 8, 1996 (age 30) Manila, Philippines
- Education: University of Perpetual Help System Dalta
- Height: 1.74 m (5 ft 9 in)
- Weight: 70 kg (154 lb)

Volleyball information
- Position: Libero
- Current club: PGJC–Navy Sea Lions

Career
- Years: Team
- 2018: Vice Co. Blockbusters
- 2018–2023, 2025–present: PGJC–Navy Sea Lions

National team
- Years: Team
- 2019–2021: Philippines

Jack Kalingking (born March 8, 1996) is a Filipino beach and indoor volleyball player. He played with Perpetual Altas men's collegiate volleyball team. He last played for the Philippine Navy Sea Lions in the Spikers' Turf.

== Career ==
=== Collegiate ===
Kalingking made his first game appearance with the Perpetual Altas in the NCAA Season 89 were his team won the title against EAC Generals.

In NCAA Season 90, they succeeded to advanced in the Semis but they failed to advance in the finals

In NCAA Season 91, they got an 8–1 win-loss record in the preliminary round tied with EAC Generals. They succeeded to advance in the finals after they won against Benilde Blazers in the Semis. They also succeeded to get the championship title after they won against EAC Generals in the Game 3 of best-of-three finals series.

In NCAA Season 92, they got an 8–1 win-loss record in the preliminary round, tied with Benilde Blazers. In the Semis, they defeated the San Beda Red Spikers in the Semis but failed to get the championship title after losing to Benilde Blazers in Game 2 of the best-of-three finals series.

In NCAA Season 93, it was the last playing year for Kalingking in the NCAA. They got a 9–0 win-loss record and were undefeated in the preliminary round so they got the advantage to advance in the finals. They got the championship title after they won against the Arellano Chiefs.

== Clubs ==
- (Philippines) Vice Co. Blockbusters (2018)
- (Philippines) PGJC–Navy Sea Lions (2018–present)

== Awards ==
=== Collegiate ===
| Year | League | Season | Title | Ref |
|---|---|---|---|---|
| 2014 | NCAA | 89 | Champions | |
| 2015 | NCAA | 90 | Runner-up | |
| 2016 | NCAA | 91 | Champions | |
| 2017 | NCAA | 92 | Runner-up | |
| 2018 | NCAA | 93 | Champions | |

=== Clubs ===
| Year | League | Season/Conference | Club | Title | Ref |
|---|---|---|---|---|---|
| 2018 | Spikers' Turf | Open | Vice Co. Blockbusters | 3rd place | |
| 2022 | Spikers' Turf | Open | PGJC–Navy Sea Lions | 3rd place | |
