= Vice Co. Blockbusters =

- Full name: Vice Cosmetics Blockbusters
- Short name: VCO
- Nickname: Blockbusters
- Founded: 2018
- Dissolved: 2018
- Captain: Jan Berlin Paglinawan
- League: Premier Volleyball League
- 2018 Reinforced: 3rd place

Uniforms
Home	Away

The Vice Co. Blockbusters is a former men's volleyball team playing in the Premier Volleyball League (PVL). The team was owned by comedian and TV host Vice Ganda.

== Honors ==
=== Team ===
Premier Volleyball League

Season	Conference	Title	Source
2018	Reinforced	3rd place	

=== Individual ===
Premier Volleyball League

Season	Conference	Award	Name	Source
2018	Reinforced	2nd Best Middle Blocker	John Paul Bugaoan	

== Notable players ==
Local players

- John Paul Bugaoan
- Jude Garcia
- Jack Kalingking
- Kim Malabunga
- Rikko Marmeto
- Jan Berlin Paglinawan
- Peter Quiel
- Vice Ganda
