= Savouge Spin Doctors =

Philippine men's volleyball club

- Full name: Savouge Aesthetics and Medical Clinic Spin Doctors
- Short name: Savouge
- Nickname: Spin Doctors
- Founded: 2023
- Head coach: Sydney Calderon
- Captain: Hero Austria
- League: Spikers' Turf
- 2026 Open: Runner-up

The Savouge Aesthetics and Medical Clinic Spin Doctors or simply the Savouge Spin Doctors is a Philippine men's volleyball club which plays in the Spikers' Turf. It is affiliated with the Savouge Aesthetics cosmetics clinic which is owned by Sydney Calderon.

== History ==
The Savouge Spin Doctors is named and ran by the Savouge Aesthetics Center, a cosmetics clinic chain. The center was established in 2021 by trans woman Sydney Calderon who also became the team owner of the Savouge Spin Doctors. Calderon did not immediately organize a volleyball team and focused on growing her own business.

The Savouge Spin Doctors was later formed debuting at the 2023 PNVF Challenge Cup initially collaborating with RTU–Basilan. They also took part at the 2024 PNVF Champions League.

They joined the Spikers' Turf for the 2024 Open Conference with Sammy Acaylar as their head coach.

In the 2024 Invitational Conference, the Spin Doctors was noted by its majority-LGBTQ+ roster and led by Savouge Aesthetics owner Calderon herself finished third place. The team duplicated its finish in the 2025 Open Conference.

Savouge reached the finals for the very first time in the 2026 Open Conference. They lost to eventual champions Criss Cross King Crunchers.

== Current roster ==
Savouge Spin Doctors
Number	Player	Position	School
1	Sherwin Caritativo	Outside Hitter	UPHSD
4	Giles Jeffer Torres	Middle Blocker	
5	Rikko Marius Marmeto	Libero	FEU
6	Mark Frederick Calado	Outside Hitter	FEU
8	Bhim Lawrence Diones	Libero	
9	Renzel Antonio	Outside Hitter	
10	Kim Dayandante	Setter	NU
11	John Christian Enarciso	Setter	
13	Michael Vince Imperial	Setter	EAC
14	John Michael Paglaon	Setter	
16	Louis Gaspar Gamban	Opposite Hitter	UP
17	KC Andrade	Middle Blocker	UPHSD
18	Madzlan Gampong	Opposite Hitter	NU
19	John Diwa	Middle Blocker	
20	Angelo Reyes	Middle Blocker	
21	Louie Ramirez	Outside Hitter	UPHSD
22	Joeven Dela Vega	Opposite Hitter	
23	Daniel Nicolas	Middle Blocker	UP
24	Hero Austria (C)	Outside Hitter	UPHSD
25	John Paul Bugaoan	Middle Blocker	FEU

- Head coach: Sydney Calderon
- Assistant coach: James Philip Sulit

== Honors ==
=== Team ===
Spikers' Turf:

Season	Conference	Title	Source
2024–25	Open	5th place	
2024–25	Invitational	3rd place	
2024–25	Open	3rd place	
2025–26	Invitational	4th place	
2025–26	Open	Runner-up	
2026–27	Invitational	TBD	

PNVF:

Year	Tournament	Title	Source
2023	PNVF Challenge Cup	8th place	
2024	PNVF Champions League	5th place	

=== Individual ===
Spikers' Turf:

Season	Conference	Award	Name	Source
2024	Invitational	2nd Best Outside Spiker	Sherwin Caritativo	
2024	Invitational	2nd Best Middle Blocker	Giles Jeffer Torres	
2025	Open	1st Best Outside Spiker	Mark Frederick Calado	
2025	Open	2nd Best Outside Spiker	Sherwin Caritativo	
2025	Invitational	1st Best Middle Blocker	Giles Jeffer Torres	
2026	Open	1st Best Middle Blocker	John Paul Bugaoan	
2026	Open	2nd Best Outside Spiker	Sherwin Caritativo	

== Team captains ==
- (Philippines) Jhun Lorenz Señoron (2024)
- (Philippines) Hero Austria (2024–present)

== Coaches ==
- (Philippines) Sammy Acaylar (2024)
- (Philippines) Sydney Calderon (2024–present)
