= Bryan Bagunas =

Filipino volleyball player (born 1997)

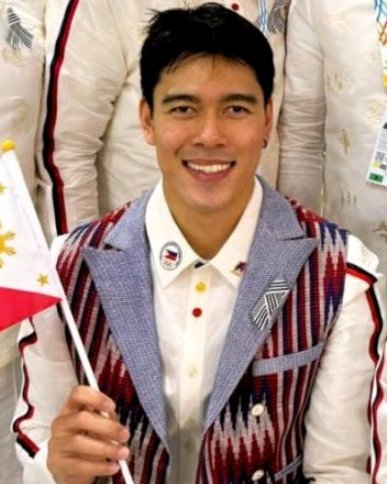
- Bagunas in 2025

Personal information
- Full name: Bryan Berroya Bagunas
- Nationality: Filipino
- Born: October 10, 1997 (age 29) Balayan, Batangas, Philippines
- Education: National University (2014–2019)
- Height: 195 cm (6 ft 5 in)
- Weight: 84 kg (185 lb)
- Spike: 368 cm (145 in)
- Block: 345 cm (136 in)

Volleyball information
- Position: Outside Spiker
- Current club: Osaka Bluteon

Career
- Years: Team
- 2018: Sta. Elena–NU
- 2019: Philippine Air Force
- 2019–2022: Oita Miyoshi Weisse Adler
- 2022–2024: Win Streak
- 2024–2025: Cignal HD Spikers
- 2025–present: Osaka Bluteon

National team
- Years: Team
- 2014–present: Philippines
Honours
Men's volleyball
Representing Philippines
Southeast Asian Games
Silver medal – second place	2019 Manila	Team
Bronze medal – third place	2025 Bangkok	Team
SEA V.League
Bronze medal – third place	2024 Manila	Team
ASEAN University Games
Gold medal – first place	2018 Naypyidaw	Team

Bryan Berroya Bagunas (born October 10, 1997) is a Filipino volleyball player who plays for the Japanese SV.League club Osaka Bluteon and the Philippine national team, which he captains.

== Early life ==
Bagunas was born on October 10, 1997, in Balayan, Batangas. Prior to his college education, he was more into basketball than volleyball. Bagunas started playing volleyball in his second year of high school education and participated in both basketball and volleyball events in his school's intramurals. He also participated in various municipal and national volleyball tournaments prior into being scouted for the National University.

== Career ==
=== Collegiate ===
Bagunas played for the men's volleyball team of the National University (NU) at the University Athletic Association of the Philippines (UAAP). He helped NU win the UAAP Seasons 80 and 81 men's volleyball titles and was also named the Finals MVP for both seasons. He was also a three-time Best Server (from UAAP Season 79 to 81) and the UAAP Attacker and Season MVP for Season 81.

Bagunas also represented NU at the 2018 Premier Volleyball League Collegiate Conference, where he aided the team's title win over the University of Santo Tomas and was also named as the 1st Best Outside Spiker and Finals MVP.

=== Club ===
==== Sta Elena and Philippine Air Force ====
In the club level, Bagunas played for Sta. Elena at the 2018 Premier Volleyball League Open Conference where Bagunas was named the 2nd Best Outside Spiker and Conference MVP. He also played for the Go for Gold-Philippine Air Force Jet Spikers of the Spikers' Turf.

==== Oita Miyoshi Weisse Adler ====
In mid-2019, Bagunas announced that he has signed to play for Japanese club, Oita Miyoshi Weisse Adler of V.League 1. His first match with the club was against the JT Thunders. According to Bagunas, training with the Japanese club leaned towards technique compared to training with Philippine-based teams which he described focus on physicality particularly on managing one's power in executing hits. He left Oita Miyoshi in June 2022.

==== Win Streak and Cignal ====
He would join Taiwanese club Win Streak in August 2022 to play for them at the Datuk Bandar Cup Win+ Streak Invitational Championship in Malaysia and later the Top Volleyball League in Taiwan. He won the title and was named league MVP.

In February 2023, Bagunas signs up with the Imus City–AJAA Spikers and is set to join the team's campaign in the 2023 Spikers' Turf Open Conference in March 2023 following the conclusion of his stint with Win Streak. However he did not play a game for Imus.

Bagunas joined the Cignal HD Spikers of the Spikers' Turf in January 2024.

Bagunas returned to Win Streak and had his contract extended by five years. He helped them win his second Top Volleyball League title with the club in April 2024.

Bagunas rejoined the Cignal in April 2024 for the 2024 Open Conference. Although he had to attend an All-Star game back in Taiwan shortly after. An ACL injury while in August 2024 playing with the national team at the 2024 SEA Men's V.League rendered him unavailable for both Win Streak and Cignal.

==== Osaka Bluteon ====
In mid-2025, Bagunas joined Osaka Bluteon of the SV.League. Bagunas helped Bluteon win the 2025–26 season title at the Suntory Sunbirds Osaka's expense.

=== National team ===
Bagunas was part of the Philippine men's national team that represented the country at the Southeast Asian Games; in the 2017 and 2019 Southeast Asian Games.

Bagunas's first participation in the Southeast Asian Games was in the 2017 edition where the Philippine national team failed to clinch a podium finish. Likewise in the 2019 Southeast Asian Games, there was some issue in the preparations with Bagunas having limited time to train with his national team teammates since he simultaneously had to fulfill his obligations to participate in a training camp with his Japanese club, Oita Miyoshi. Despite this, the national team was able to secure a finals appearance in 42 years and clinch a silver medal finish after losing to Indonesia in the final.

NU represented the Philippines at the 2018 ASEAN University Games in Myanmar. Bagunas was part of that Philippine squad which won the men's volleyball title by beating Thailand's representatives in the gold medal match. This surpassed the Philippines' bronze medal finish in the 2016 edition held in Singapore.

In 2025, Bagunas and Alexandra Eala were designated as the Philippines' flag-bearers to the 2025 SEA Games in Thailand.

== Personal life ==
Bagunas married Nicole Tracy Tan in 2023.

== Clubs ==
- (Philippines) Go for Gold-Philippine Air Force Jet Spikers (2016–2019)
- (Philippines) Sta. Elena–NU (2018)
- (Japan) Oita Miyoshi Weisse Adler (2019–2022)
- (Chinese Taipei) Win Streak (2022–2024)
- (Philippines) Cignal HD Spikers (2024–2025)
- (Japan) Osaka Bluteon (2025–present)

== Awards ==
=== Individual awards ===
- 2016 Spikers' Turf 2nd Reinforced Open Conference "Most valuable player (Finals)"
- UAAP Season 79 “Best Server”
- UAAP Season 80 “Finals MVP”
- 2018 Premier Volleyball League Reinforced Conference "Most valuable player (Finals)"
- 2018 Premier Volleyball League 2nd Season Collegiate Conference "Most valuable player (Finals)"
- 2018 Premier Volleyball League 2nd Season Collegiate Conference "1st Best Outside Spiker"
- 2018 Spikers' Turf Open Conference "Season's Most Valuable Player"
- 2018 Spikers' Turf Open Conference "2nd Best Outside Spiker"
- UAAP Season 81 “Season's MVP”
- UAAP Season 81 “Finals MVP”
- UAAP Season 81 “1st Best Outside Spiker”
- UAAP Season 81 “Best Server”
- 2022–23 Top Volleyball League "Best outside spiker"
- 2022–23 Top Volleyball League "Most valuable player"
- 2024 Spikers' Turf Open Conference "Most valuable player (Finals)"

=== Clubs ===
- 2022–23 Top Volleyball League – Champion, with Win Streak
- 2023–24 Top Volleyball League – Champion, with Win Streak
- 2024 Spikers' Turf Open Conference Champions – Champion, with Cignal
- 2025–26 SV.League – Champion, with Osaka Bluteon
