= Hero Austria =

Personal information
- Nationality: Filipino
- Hometown: Parañaque
- Education: Perpetual

Volleyball information
- Position: Outside hitter
- Current club: Savouge Spin Doctors
- Number: 24

Career
Years	Teams
2023	Imus–Ivy Tuason Photography
2023	Santa Rosa City Lions
2024–present	Savouge Spin Doctors

Hero Austria is a volleyball player who plays for the Savouge Spin Doctors in the Spikers' Turf.

== Early life and education ==
Growing up in Parañaque, Austria learned volleyball from who he called "gay mother figures". He attended the University of Perpetual Help System DALTA. He briefly studied at the Arellano University in 2021 before moving back to Perpetual.

== Career ==
=== High school ===
Austria has previously played in barangay league before he was spotted by scouts. He eventually played for the Perpetual Altas in the National Collegiate Athletic Association (NCAA) volleyball championships. Austria played for the Perpetual Junior Altas in the junior division of the NCAA. He was named Finals MVP of the boy's volleyball tournament in NCAA Season 94 (2019) where the team won their fifth consecutive title.

=== Collegiate ===
He made his debut for the senior Altas team under coach Sammy Acaylar in the cancelled NCAA Season 95. He played with the team at the 2022 Collegiate Challenge of the V-League, He was ineligible to play for Season 98 since he briefly moved to Arellano during the height of the COVID-19 pandemic and to serve one-year residency. By August 2023, Austria has changed his mind and did not return to play for Perpetual anymore.

=== Club ===
Austria played for the Imus–Ivy Tuason Photography, also coached by Acaylar, at the 2023 Open Conference of the Spikers' Turf. In the 2023 Invitational Conference, Austria suited up for the Santa Rosa City Lions.

In 2024, Austria joined the LGBTQ-oriented Savouge Spin Doctors in the Spikers' Turf where he later became team captain.

== Personal life ==
Austria is a member of the LGBTQ community.
