= George Pascua =

Filipino volleyball coach

Personal information
- Nationality: Filipino
- Born: February 5, 1972 (age 54)
- Education: Far Eastern University

Coaching information
- Current team: Adamson University (men)
- Previous teams coached
- Years: Teams
  - 2014–2016 2017–2022 2017 2018 2022 2022–: Far Eastern University (men); Petron Blaze Spikers; Far Eastern University (women); Cignal HD Spikers (women); Sta. Lucia Lady Realtors; PLDT High Speed Hitters; Adamson University (men)

Volleyball information

National team
- Years: Team
- –: Philippines

George Pascua is a Filipino volleyball coach who is the head coach of the Adamson Soaring Falcons' men's volleyball team. He was the head coach of the PLDT High Speed Hitters during the 2022 season of the Premier Volleyball League. He was also a longtime coach of the Far Eastern University's women's volleyball team and a former player of the university's men's team.

== Career ==
=== Playing career ===
Prior to becoming a volleyball coach, Pascua was part of the Far Eastern University's (FEU) men's volleyball team playing alongside Ramil De Jesus. He was also formerly part of the Philippine men's national team.

=== Coaching career ===
==== Far Eastern University ====
Pascua became part of the coaching staff of his alma mater's volleyball program. He was head coach of FEU's men's volleyball team which he helped clinched four UAAP Volleyball Championship titles with the last of the four title won in 2012. He would later leave FEU to coach in the Philippine Super Liga (PSL). He returned to FEU in June 2017, when he succeeded Shaq delos Santos as head coach of FEU's women's volleyball team.

==== Philippine Super Liga ====
===== Petron =====
Pascua has coached in the Philippine Super Liga (PSL). He was head coach of the Petron Blaze Spikers until 2016 helping the team win the 2014 Grand Prix and 2015 All-Filipino titles. Petron under Pascua's watch were runner-ups in the 2015 Grand Prix. The core of the team disbanded in 2016 and Pascua had to contend with a team full of rookies and direct hires. He led the revamped team to the semifinals of the 2016 All-Filipino Conference.

===== Cignal and Sta. Lucia =====
He returned to college volleyball with FEU in 2017, but concurrently became coach of PSL team Cignal HD Spikers which he helped win the 2017 Invitational Cup title. However his stint followed a downward trend, with Cignal settling for a bronze in the All-Filipino Conference and failing to advance from the quarterfinals in the Grand Prix due to multiple player injuries. He joined the Sta. Lucia Lady Realtors by the end of the year. He was coach of Sta. Lucia until sometime in 2018 when he took a four-year hiatus from coaching volleyball clubs.

==== Premier Volleyball League ====
===== PLDT =====
The PLDT High Speed Hitters of the Premier Volleyball League (PVL) appointed him as their head coach to succeed Roger Gorayeb in January 2022, marking Pascua's return to club volleyball. he left PLDT after the conclusion of the 2022 PVL season.
