= Spikers' Turf =

Men's volleyball league in the Philippines

- Most recent season or competition: 2026 Spikers' Turf Invitational Conference
- Sport: Volleyball
- Founded: 2015
- Founder: Sports Vision Management Group, Inc.
- First season: 2015
- Director: Mozzy Ravena
- President: Alyssa Valdez
- Motto: Where Power Meets Passion
- No. of teams: 8
- Country: Philippines
- Venue: Various
- Most recent champion: Criss Cross (2026 Open)
- Most titles: Cignal (7 titles)
- Broadcasters: One Sports; One Sports+
- Streaming partners: Cignal Play; One Sports YouTube Channel
- Website: spikersturf.ph

Spikers' Turf is the top-level men's semi-professional volleyball league in the Philippines. The league was established in 2015 by Sports Vision Management Group, Inc., the same organization behind the women's Shakey's V-League and later the Premier Volleyball League.

The first running of Spikers' Turf lasted from 2015 to 2016 before it merged with the PVL in 2017 as its men's division. In 2018, it was spun off and the league was reestablished.

The Cignal Super Spikers were the defending champions, but has since been vacated after the team took a leave of absence in January 2026. With seven titles, Cignal is also the most successful team in the league. The Criss Cross King Crunchers are the only active team to win a championship.

== History ==
The league had its beginnings in 2014, when the Shakey's V-League introduced a men's division during the 2014 Reinforced Open Conference. The following year, Sports Vision decided to spin off the men's division as a separate league, giving birth to Spikers' Turf.

In late-2016, Sports Vision announced that the league be merged back in the 2017 season with the Shakey's V-League (which was renamed as the Premier Volleyball League; PVL). The men's division in the PVL ended with the 2018 PVL Collegiate Conference as its final tournament. Spikers' Turf was then revived on October 6, 2018 and was reestablished as a separate legal entity from the PVL.

In 2020, Spikers' Turf began the process to turn to a professional league, after the PVL was given professional status by the national government's Games and Amusement Board in the same year. The league did not stage its 2020 season due to the COVID-19 pandemic. On March 16, 2021, Sports Vision president Ricky Palou bared that only three teams out of six - Cignal HD, PLDT and VNS - agreed to turn professional.

== Teams ==
Spikers' Turf teams
Abbr.	Team	Company	Head coach	Team captain	Year joined
TEM	3B Event Masters	3B Production & Entertainment	(Philippines) Arjay Francisco	Bonjomar Castel	2024
AFP	AFP Cav Spikers	Armed Forces of the Philippines	(Philippines) Benjaylo Labide	Jessie Lopez	2026
ALP	Alpha Insurance Protectors	Alpha Insurance & Surety Company Inc.	(Philippines) Mike Santos	Jefferson Abuniawan	2025
CAB	AEP Cabstars	Cabstars Men's Volleyball Team / Cabuyao	(Philippines) Kitty Antiporta	Miguel Andrew Dasig	2023
CKC	Criss Cross King Crunchers	Republic Biscuit Corporation	(Thailand) Tai Bundit	Ysay Marasigan	2024
CUV	Clearskiiin UV Smashers	Savouge Aesthetics Philippines	(Philippines) (United States) Joe Bangit	Louis Gamban; JM Ronquillo	2026–27
SVG	Savouge Spin Doctors	Savouge Aesthetics Philippines	(Philippines) Sydney Calderon	Hero Austria	2024
VNS	VNS Griffins	VNS Management Group	(Philippines) Ralph Raymund Ocampo	John Joshua Cruz	2016

== Season format ==
Similar to the PVL, a traditional Spikers' Turf season is composed of multiple conferences. Since 2023, two are held each season – the first being the Open Conference and the second being the Invitational Conference. A conference is divided into two phases, the preliminary round and final round, the latter serving as the conference's playoffs.

From 2015 to 2018, Spikers' Turf conferences mirrored that of its then-women's counterpart, the Shakey's V-League and later the Premier Volleyball League during the integration. Alongside the Open Conference, the league also held the Reinforced and Collegiate Conferences. When Spikers' Turf was spun off, the league began using its own schedule.

Since 2019, the league doesn't host a Collegiate Conference. Instead, collegiate teams competed alongside corporate teams in the Open Conference. In 2022, only the Open Conference was contested after the Collegiate Conference was integrated into the relaunch of the V-League. As the league has yet to turn pro, it is possible for players to take part in both Spikers' Turf and the relaunched V-League.

=== Active tournaments ===
- The Open Conference is a conference where corporate-backed local teams can compete. In 2019, the conference also featured collegiate teams. This conference has been held eight times as of the 2025 season.
- The Invitational Conference is a conference where collegiate and international club teams are invited to play in a tournament against the local teams. This conference has been held twice as of the 2024 season.

=== Defunct tournaments ===
- The Collegiate Conference (2015–2016) was a pre-season tournament for college and university teams in preparation for the respective regular seasons of their mother leagues. This conference was held twice during its lifetime.
- The Reinforced Conference (2015–2016; 2019) was an import-laden conference where teams can hire foreign reinforcement(s), although most teams have opted to not hire any imports. This conference was held three times during its lifetime.

== Results summary ==
=== Open Conference ===
Season	Champions	Runners-up	Third place	Details
2015	PLDT Home Ultera Ultra Fast Hitters	Cagayan Valley Rising Suns	Philippine Air Force Airmen	2015 Open
2016	Philippine Air Force Air Spikers	Cignal HD Spikers	Sta. Elena Wrecking Balls	2016 Open
2017	Cignal HD Spikers	Megabuilders Volley Bolts	Philippine Air Force Air Spikers	2017 Open
2018	Philippine Air Force Air Spikers	PLDT Home Fibr Power Hitters	Cignal HD Spikers	2018 Open
2019	Cignal HD Spikers	Go for Gold–Air Force Air Spikers	Sta. Elena–NU Ball Hammers	2019 Open
2020	tournament cancelled due to COVID-19 pandemic			
2021	tournament cancelled due to COVID-19 pandemic			
2022	NU–Sta. Elena Nationals	Cignal HD Spikers	PGJC–Navy Sea Lions	2022 Open
2023	Cignal HD Spikers	AMC Cotabato Spikers	Imus City–AJAA Spikers	2023 Open
2024–25	Cignal HD Spikers	Criss Cross King Crunchers	PGJC–Navy Sea Lions	2024 Open
2024–25	Cignal HD Spikers	Criss Cross King Crunchers	Savouge Spin Doctors	2025 Open
2025–26	Criss Cross King Crunchers	Savouge Spin Doctors	AEP Cabstars	2026 Open

=== Invitational Conference ===
Season	Champions	Runners-up	Third place	Details
2023	Sta. Elena–NU Nationals	Cignal HD Spikers	Maruichi Hyogo	2023 Invitational
2024–25	Cignal HD Spikers	Criss Cross King Crunchers	Savouge Spin Doctors	2024 Invitational
2025–26	Criss Cross King Crunchers	Kindai University	Cignal Super Spikers	2025 Invitational
2026–27	TBD			2026 Invitational

=== Reinforced Conference ===
Season	Champions	Runners-up	Third place	Details
2015	Cignal HD Spikers	Philippine Air Force Airmen	PLDT Home Ultera Ultra Fast Hitters	2015 Reinforced
2016	Philippine Air Force Air Spikers	Cignal HD Spikers	Champion Supra Smashers	2016 Reinforced
2017	Cignal HD Spikers	Philippine Air Force Air Spikers	Philippine Army Troopers	2017 Reinforced
2018	Philippine Air Force Air Spikers	Cignal HD Spikers	Vice Cosmetics Blockbusters	2018 Reinforced
2019	Cignal HD Spikers	Philippine Air Force Jet Spikers	PLDT Home Fibr Power Hitters	2019 Reinforced

=== Collegiate Conference ===
Season	Champions	Runners-up	Third place	Details
2015	Ateneo Blue Eagles	NU Bulldogs	EAC Generals	2015 Collegiate
2016	Ateneo Blue Eagles	NU Bulldogs	UST Golden Spikers	2016 Collegiate
2017	Ateneo Blue Eagles	FEU Tamaraws	UST Golden Spikers	2017 Collegiate
2018	NU Bulldogs	UST Golden Spikers	FEU Tamaraws	2018 Collegiate
2022	see V-League			

== Medal table ==
Inactive or former team
Guest team

Commercial/club teams

Team	Gold medal	Silver medal	Bronze medal	Total
Cignal Super Spikers	9	5	2	16
Philippine Air Force Air Spikers	4	4	2	10
Criss Cross King Crunchers	2	3	0	5
PLDT Home Fibr Power Hitters	1	1	2	4
Savouge Spin Doctors	0	1	2	3
AMC Cotabato Spikers	0	1	0	1
Cagayan Valley Rising Suns	0	1	0	1
Kindai University	0	1	0	1
Megabuilders Volley Bolts	0	1	0	1
Sta. Elena Ball Hammers	0	0	3	3
Philippine Navy Sea Lions	0	0	2	2
AEP Cabstars	0	0	1	1
Imus City–AJAA Spikers	0	0	1	1
Maruichi Hyogo	0	0	1	1
Philippine Army Troopers	0	0	1	1
Vice Co. Blockbusters	0	0	1	1

Collegiate teams

Team	Gold medal	Silver medal	Bronze medal	Total
NU Bulldogs	3	2	0	5
Ateneo Blue Eagles	3	0	0	3
UST Golden Spikers	0	1	2	3
FEU Tamaraws	0	1	1	2
EAC Generals	0	0	1	1

== Awardees ==
Below is the table for the most awarded players in the league's history (2015–2016; 2018–present):

Rank	Name	Current / Last team	Position	Years playing in Spikers' Turf		MVP award	Positional award	Total
Rank	Name	Current / Last team	Position	From	To	MVP award	Positional award	Total
1	Marck Jesus Espejo	Criss Cross	OH	2015	present	7	6	13
2	Jude Garcia	Criss Cross	OP	2018	present	6	2	8
3	Ysrael Wilson Marasigan	Criss Cross	OP	2015	present	1	5	6
4	Alnakran Abdilla	Air Force	OH	2015	2024	2	3	5
4	John Paul Bugaoan	Savouge	MB	2019	present	0	5	5
5	Bryan Bagunas	Osaka Bluteon (Japan)	OH	2015	2024	3	1	4
5	Mark Alfafara	PLDT	OH	2015	2019	2	2	4
5	Joshua Umandal	Alpha Insurance	OH	2022	present	1	3	4
5	Peter Den Mar Torres	Cignal	MB	2015	2023	0	4	4
5	Manuel Sumanguid III	Criss Cross	L	2015	present	0	4	4

== Notable records ==
- Marck Espejo of the Cignal HD Spikers holds the record of highest number of scored points in a single game, 43 points (33 spikes, 2 blocks & 8 service aces).
  - Previous record holder was Howard Mojica of the EAC Generals with 41 points (38 spikes, 1 block & 2 service aces) in a match against the Ateneo Blue Eagles during the quarter finals round of the 2015 collegiate conference - ref. Match 34 P2
- The Ateneo Blue Eagles made history in the Spikers' Turf by being the first team to sweep a collegiate conference (13 wins & 0 loss).
- Cignal HD Spikers also made history in the Spikers' Turf by being the first club/corporate team to sweep a conference (15 wins & 0 loss).

== Venues ==
The league's games are mainly held across Metro Manila, primarily on Paco Arena from 2019 to 2023. Recently, the games have dispersed again outside Paco Arena, with some playing outside the metropolis.

- Metro Manila
  - Blue Eagle Gym, Quezon City
  - Smart Araneta Coliseum, Quezon City
  - Playtime Filoil Centre, San Juan City
  - PhilSports Arena, Pasig
  - Ynares Sports Arena, Pasig
  - Paco Arena, Manila
  - Rizal Memorial Coliseum, Manila
  - Ninoy Aquino Stadium, Manila
  - SM Mall of Asia Arena, Pasay
- Outside of Metro Manila
  - Ynares Center, Antipolo
  - Santa Rosa Sports Complex, Santa Rosa

== Media coverage ==
The league's initial broadcast partner was the People's Television Network in its first season. In 2016, it was handed over to ABS-CBN Sports+Action, the same broadcast partner with its former women's counterpart league, Shakey's V-League. This partnership with ABS-CBN continued as the Spikers' Turf merged with the rebranded Premier Volleyball League. Upon its separation from the PVL and re-establishment, Cignal TV became the league's primary broadcast partner in 2018.

With the rise of online streaming services, the live coverage of the games can be viewed via Cignal Play, Pilipinas Live app, and the league's official website.

- People's Television Network (2015)
- ABS-CBN Sports (2016)
  - ABS-CBN Sports+Action (2016)
- Cignal TV (2018–present)
  - Hyper (2018)
  - One Sports (2019–present)
  - Cignal Play (2022–present)
  - One Sports+ (2022–present)
  - Pilipinas Live (2023–2026)

== See also ==
- Premier Volleyball League
- V-League (Philippines)
- UAAP volleyball championships
- NCAA volleyball championships (Philippines)
- Volleyball in the Philippines
- Men's Asian Club Volleyball Championship
