= Ateneo Blue Eagles men's volleyball =

Collegiate men's volleyball team

Ateneo Blue Eagles
- University: Ateneo de Manila University
- Nickname: Blue Eagles
- Location: Quezon City, Philippines
- Head coach: Jayson Godin Baton
- Captain: Kelvin Fulgencio

Main league
- League: UAAP
- Season 85 (2023): 5th

Other league/s
- League: Spikers' Turf
- Competes as: Ateneo–Fudgee Barr Blue Eagles
- 2023 Invitational: 19th
- Sponsor/Partner: Republic Biscuit Corporation

Championships
- UAAP: 3

The Ateneo Blue Eagles men's volleyball program is the men's collegiate varsity volleyball team of the Ateneo de Manila University. The team competes in the University Athletic Association of the Philippines (UAAP).

== History ==
The Ateneo Blue Eagles men's volleyball team was formed in 1967. They first played competitive varsity volleyball when they participated in the women's volleyball tournament of the NCAA (Philippines) in Season 43 (1967–68).

After 7 year, Season 51 (1975–76), the Blue Eagles won their first NCAA men's volleyball championship. In Season 52 (1976–1977), they won their second NCAA volleyball championship title and first back-to-back championship title.

They were unable to defend their title in the NCAA because Ateneo de Manila transferred to the University Athletic Association of the Philippines (UAAP) in 1978. The team did not win a championship for the next 37 years. These titles are won by Blue Eagles UAAP Season 77 (2014–2015), UAAP Season 78 (2015–2016), UAAP Season 79 (2016–2017).

== Current roster ==
=== Ateneo Blue Eagles men's volleyball team ===
UAAP Season 85 roster
Number	Player	Position	Height	Birth date	High School
1	Lawrence Gil Magadia	Setter	1.76 m (5 ft 9 in)		De La Salle Lipa
2	Leinuel Crisostomo	Outside Hitter	5 ft 8 in (1.73 m)	June 17, 2002 (age 24)	De La Salle Zobel
4	Jettlee Gopio	Middle Blocker			
5	Kennedy Batas	Opposite Hitter		September 5, 2001 (age 24)	
6	Lutrelle Andrei Taneo	Outside Hitter			
7	James Daniel Licauco	Setter	1.77 m (5 ft 10 in)	June 7, 2001 (age 25)	
8	Amil Pacinio Jr.	Outside Hitter	1.82 m (6 ft 0 in)		
10	Paulo Lorenzo Trinidad	Libero			
11	Canciano Llenos	Outside Hitter			
13	Lance Andrei De Castro	Libero	5 ft 7 in (1.70 m)	August 10, 2000 (age 25)	
14	Emmanuel Go	Setter			
17	Jeric Sendon	Middle Blocker			
18	Jian Matthew Salarzon	Outside Hitter	6 ft 3 in (1.91 m)	October 4, 2003 (age 22)	
22	Charles David Absid	Middle Blocker			
23	Joseph Brian Castro	Middle Blocker	6 ft 4 in (1.93 m)	October 24, 2001 (age 24)	

== Previous roster ==
=== UAAP Champions ===
UAAP Season 77 roster
OH - • 2 Karl Irvin Baysa • 15 Marck Jesus Espejo • 17 Sebastian Enrique Cuerva • 18 Ismael John Rivera
OPP - • 8 Ysrael Wilson Marasigan
MB - • 4 Joshua Alexis Miguel Villanueva • 5 Jasper Rodney Tan • 11 Rex Emmanuel Intal
S - • 14 Esmilzo Joner Polvoroza
L - • 12 Dan Angelo Posadas • 13 Manuel Sumanguid III

UAAP Season 78 roster
OH - • 2 Karl Irvin Baysa • 15 Marck Jesus Espejo • 17 Sebastian Enrique Cuerva • 18 Ismael John Rivera
OPP - • 3 Ron Adrian Medalla • 8 Ysrael Wilson Marasigan
MB - • 4 Joshua Alexis Miguel Villanueva • 5 Jasper Rodney Tan • 11 Rex Emmanuel Intal • 16 Gian Carlo Glorosio
S - • 1 Lawrence Gil Magadia • 14 Esmilzo Joner Polvoroza
L - • 12 Dan Angelo Posadas • 13 Manuel Sumanguid III

UAAP Season 79 roster
OH - • 2 Karl Irvin Baysa • 3 Ron Adrian Medalla • 15 Marck Jesus Espejo • 18 Ismael John Rivera
OPP - • 6 Anthony Paul Koyfman • 10 Paulo Lorenzo Trinidad
MB - • 4 Joshua Alexis Miguel Villanueva • 5 Jasper Rodney Tan • 11 Rex Emmanuel Intal • 12 Chumason Celestine Njigha • 16 Gian Carlo Glorosio
S - • 1 Lawrence Gil Magadia • 14 Esmilzo Joner Polvoroza
L - • 13 Manuel Sumanguid III

=== Spikers' Turf/PVL Champions ===
Spikers' Turf 1st Season Collegiate Conference roster
OH - • 2 Karl Irvin Baysa • 3 Ron Adrian Medalla • 15 Marck Jesus Espejo • 18 Ismael John Rivera
OPP - • 6 Anthony Paul Koyfman • 8 Ysrael Wilson Marasigan (c)
MB - • 4 Joshua Alexis Miguel Villanueva • 9 Timothy James Sto. Tomas • 11 Rex Emmanuel Intal • 16 Gian Carlo Glorosio
S - • 1 Lawrence Gil Magadia (G) • 14 Esmilzo Joner Polvoroza
L - • 12 Dan Angelo Posadas (G) • 13 Manuel Sumanguid III

Spikers' Turf 2nd Season Collegiate Conference roster
OH - • 2 Karl Irvin Baysa (c) • 3 Ron Adrian Medalla • 10 Paulo Lorenzo Trinidad • 15 Marck Jesus Espejo
OPP - • 6 Anthony Paul Koyfman • 8 Ysrael Wilson Marasigan
MB - • 4 Joshua Alexis Miguel Villanueva • 5 Jasper Rodney Tan • 9 Timothy James Sto. Tomas (G) • 11 Rex Emmanuel Intal • 16 Gian Carlo Glorosio
S - • 1 Lawrence Gil Magadia • 14 Esmilzo Joner Polvoroza
L - • 13 Manuel Sumanguid III

2017 PVL Collegiate Conference roster
OH - • 2 Karl Irvin Baysa (c) • 15 Marck Jesus Espejo • 17 Sebastian Enrique Cuerva • 18 Ismael John Rivera • 19 Canciano Llenos
OPP - • 3 Ron Adrian Medalla • 10 Paulo Lorenzo Trinidad
MB - • 5 Jasper Rodney Tan • 12 Chumason Celestine Njigha • 16 Gian Carlo Glorosio
S - • 1 Lawrence Gil Magadia • 14 Esmilzo Joner Polvoroza
L - • 9 Hermino Labao • 13 Manuel Sumanguid III

== Team honors ==
=== NCAA ===
Ateneo Blue Eagles
Year	Season	Title	Ref
1975–1976	NCAA Season 51	Champions	
1976–1977	NCAA Season 52	Champions	

=== UAAP ===
Ateneo Blue Eagles
Year	Season	Title	Ref
2014–2015	UAAP Season 77	Champions	
2015–2016	UAAP Season 78	Champions	
2016–2017	UAAP Season 79	Champions	

=== Other Collegiate Leagues ===
Ateneo Blue Eagles
Year	Season	Title	Ref
2015	Spikers' Turf 1st Season Collegiate Conference	Champions	
2016	Spikers' Turf 2nd Season Collegiate Conference	Champions	
2017	2017 PVL Collegiate Conference (men's)	Champions	

== Individual honors ==
=== UAAP ===
Ateneo Blue Eagles
Year	Season	Award	Player	Ref
2008-2009	UAAP Season 71	Rookie of the Year	Duane Craig Teves	
2009-2010	UAAP Season 72	Most Valuable Player (Season)	Andre Joseph Pareja	
2009-2010	UAAP Season 72	Best Attacker	Andre Joseph Pareja	
2013-2014	UAAP Season 76	Most Valuable Player (Season)	Marck Jesus Espejo	
2013-2014	UAAP Season 76	Rookie of the Year	Marck Jesus Espejo	
2013-2014	UAAP Season 76	Best Setter	Esmilzo Joner Polvoroza	
2014-2015	UAAP Season 77	Most Valuable Player (Season)	Marck Jesus Espejo	
2014-2015	UAAP Season 77	Best Attacker	Marck Jesus Espejo	
2014-2015	UAAP Season 77	Best Setter	Esmilzo Joner Polvoroza	
2014-2015	UAAP Season 77	Most Valuable Player (Finals)	Esmilzo Joner Polvoroza	
2015-2016	UAAP Season 78	Most Valuable Player (Season)	Marck Jesus Espejo	
2015-2016	UAAP Season 78	Best Attacker	Marck Jesus Espejo	
2015-2016	UAAP Season 78	Best Server	Marck Jesus Espejo	
2015-2016	UAAP Season 78	Most Valuable Player (Finals)	Ysrael Wilson Marasigan	
2015-2016	UAAP Season 78	Best Setter	Esmilzo Joner Polvoroza	
2016-2017	UAAP Season 79	Most Valuable Player (Season)	Marck Jesus Espejo	
2016-2017	UAAP Season 79	Best Scorer	Marck Jesus Espejo	
2016-2017	UAAP Season 79	Best Attacker	Marck Jesus Espejo	
2016-2017	UAAP Season 79	Most Valuable Player (Finals)	Antony Paul Koyfman	
2016-2017	UAAP Season 79	Rookie of the Year	Chumason Celestine Njigha	
2016-2017	UAAP Season 79	Best Setter	Esmilzo Joner Polvoroza	
2017-2018	UAAP Season 80	Most Valuable Player (Season)	Marck Jesus Espejo	
2017-2018	UAAP Season 80	Best Scorer	Marck Jesus Espejo	
2017-2018	UAAP Season 80	Best Attacker	Marck Jesus Espejo	
2017-2018	UAAP Season 80	Best Server	Marck Jesus Espejo	
2017-2018	UAAP Season 80	Rookie of the Year	Ariel Morado Jr.	
2017-2018	UAAP Season 80	Best Setter	Esmilzo Joner Polvoroza	
2019-2020	UAAP Season 81	2nd Best Middle Blocker	Chumason Celestine Njigha	
2019-2020	UAAP Season 81	Best Setter	Lawrence Gil Magadia	
2019-2020	UAAP Season 81	Best Libero	Manuel Sumanguid III	
2022-2023	UAAP Season 85	Best Libero	Lance Andrei De Castro	

=== Other Collegiate Leagues ===
Ateneo Blue Eagles
Year	Season	Award	Player	Ref
2015	Spikers' Turf 1st Season Collegiate Conference	Most Valuable Player (Season)	Marck Jesus Espejo	
2015	Spikers' Turf 1st Season Collegiate Conference	Most Valuable Player (finals)	Marck Jesus Espejo	
2015	Spikers' Turf 1st Season Collegiate Conference	2nd Best Outside Spiker	Marck Jesus Espejo	
2015	Spikers' Turf 1st Season Collegiate Conference	Best Opposite Spiker	Ysrael Wilson Marasigan	
2016	Spikers' Turf 2nd Season Collegiate Conference	Most Valuable Player (Season)	Marck Jesus Espejo	
2016	Spikers' Turf 2nd Season Collegiate Conference	Most Valuable Player (finals)	Marck Jesus Espejo	
2016	Spikers' Turf 2nd Season Collegiate Conference	1st Best Outside Spiker	Marck Jesus Espejo	
2016	Spikers' Turf 2nd Season Collegiate Conference	Best Setter	Esmilzo Joner Polvoroza	
2017	2017 PVL Collegiate Conference	Most Valuable Player (Season)	Marck Jesus Espejo	
2017	2017 PVL Collegiate Conference	Most Valuable Player (finals)	Marck Jesus Espejo	
2017	2017 PVL Collegiate Conference	1st Best Outside Spiker	Marck Jesus Espejo	
2017	2017 PVL Collegiate Conference	Best Setter	Esmilzo Joner Polvoroza	
2017	2017 PVL Collegiate Conference	Best Libero	Manuel Sumanguid III	
2022	2022 V-League Collegiate Challenge	1st Best Middle Blocker	Jetlee Gopio	
2022	2022 V-League Collegiate Challenge	Best Opposite Spiker	Kennedy Batas	

== Records by season ==
=== UAAP ===
Records starting UAAP Season 56

Ateneo Blue Eagles
Year	UAAP Season	Place	Team Captain	Finals opponent or Lost to (finalist or higher rank)
1993–1994	56	8th place		
1994–1995	57	6th place		
1995–1996	58	8th place		
1996–1997	59	Did not join		
1997–1998	60	8th place		
1998–1999	61	8th place		
1999–2000	62	8th place		
2000–2001	63	8th Place		
2001–2002	64	8th place		
2002–2003	65	8th place		
2003–2004	66	8th place		
2004–2005	67	8th place		
2005–2006	68	8th place		
2006–2007	69	5th place		
2007–2008	70	7th place		
2008–2009	71	4th Place		
2009–2010	72	3rd Place		
2010–2011	73	6th place		
2011–2012	74	7th place		
2012–2013	75	6th place		
2013–2014	76	Runners-up		NU Bulldogs
2014–2015	77	Champions		NU Bulldogs
2015–2016	78	Champions		NU Bulldogs
2016–2017	79	Champions		NU Bulldogs
2017–2018	80	Runners-up		NU Bulldogs
2018–2019	81	3rd Place		NU Bulldogs
2019–2020	82	cancelled		
2020–2021	83	cancelled		
2021–2022	84	cancelled		
2022–2023	85	5th place	Lance Andrei De Castro	DLSU Green Spikers

=== Other Collegiate Leagues ===
==== Spikers' Turf/PVL ====
Records by season
Year	Tournament	Competed as	Placement
2015 Spikers' Turf	Collegiate	Ateneo Blue Eagles	Champions
2016 Spikers' Turf	Collegiate	Ateneo Blue Eagles	Champions
2017 PVL	Collegiate	Ateneo Blue Eagles	Champions
2018 PVL	Collegiate	did not join	
2019 Spikers' Turf	Open	Ateneo Blue Eagles	8th place
2020 Spikers' Turf	no tournament due to the COVID-19 pandemic		
2021 Spikers' Turf	no tournament due to the COVID-19 pandemic		
2022 Spikers' Turf	Open	Ateneo–Fudgee Barr	6th place
2023 Spikers' Turf	Open	did not join	
2023 Spikers' Turf	Invitational	Ateneo–Fudgee Barr	19th place

==== V-League PH ====
Records by season
Year	Tournament	Competed as	Placement
2022 V-League	Collegiate	Ateneo Blue Eagles	4th place
2023 V-League	Collegiate	Ateneo Blue Eagles	4th place

== Head coaches ==
- UAAP Season 81–UAAP Season 86 (Philippines) Timothy James Sto. Tomas
- UAAP Season 87–present: (Philippines) Vince Mangulabnan

== Former players ==
- (Philippines) Esmilzo Joner Polvoroza (S)
- (Philippines) Manuel Sumanguid III (L)
- (Philippines) AJ Pareja (MB)
- (Philippines) Chumason Celestine Njigha (MB)
- (Philippines) Rex Emmanuel Intal (MB)
- (Philippines) Marck Jesus Espejo (OH)
- (Philippines) Ysrael Wilson Marasigan (OP)

Legend
S	Setter
L	Libero
MB	Middle Blocker
OS	Outside Hitter
OP	Opposite Hitter

== See also ==
- Ateneo de Manila University
- Ateneo Blue Eagles
- Ateneo Blue Eagles women's volleyball
