= 2016 Spikers' Turf Collegiate Conference =

- Duration: July 30 – September 12, 2016
- Teams: 12

Results
- Champions: Ateneo Blue Eagles
- Runners-up: NU Bulldogs
- Third place: UST Growling Tigers
- Fourth place: De La Salle Green Archers

Awards
- Conference MVP: Marck Espejo
- Finals MVP: Antony Koyfman
- Best OH: Marck Espejo; Raymark Woo
- Best MB: Rafael del Pilar; Kim Malabunga
- Best OPP: Madzlan Gampong
- Best Setter: Ish Polvorosa
- Best Libero: Lester Sawal

Spikers' Turf Collegiate Conference chronology
- < 2015 2017 (PVL) >

Spikers' Turf conference chronology
- < 2016 Open 2016 Reinforced >

The 2016 Spikers' Turf Collegiate Conference was the second conference of the 2016 season of Spikers' Turf and the second running of the Collegiate Conference. The tournament started on July 30, 2016 and ended on September 10, 2016 with games held at the Ynares Sports Arena and PhilSports Arena. There were twelve competing teams in this conference.

== Format ==
Preliminary round

- In the preliminary round, teams were split into two groups of six.
- The preliminary round was a single round-robin tournament, with each team playing one match against all other teams in their group for a total of five matches.
- The top two teams advanced to the semifinals while the bottom four were eliminated.

Semifinals

- The semifinals featured best-of-three series.
- The match-ups were as follows:
  - SF1: A1 vs. B2
  - SF2: B1 vs. A2
- The winners advanced to the championship while the losers would play in the third-place series.

Finals

- The championship and third-place series were best-of-three series.
- The match-ups were as follows:
  - Championship: Semifinal round winners
  - Third-place series: Semifinal round losers

== Pool standing procedure ==
- First, teams are ranked by the number of matches won.
- If the number of matches won is tied, the tied teams are then ranked by match points, wherein:
  - Match won 3–0 or 3–1: 3 match points for the winner, 0 match points for the loser.
  - Match won 3–2: 2 match points for the winner, 1 match point for the loser.
- In case of any further ties, the following criteria shall be used:
  - Set ratio: the number of sets won divided by number of sets lost.
  - Point ratio: number of points scored divided by number of points allowed.
  - Head-to-head standings: any remaining tied teams are ranked based on the results of head-to-head matches involving the teams in question.

== Preliminary round ==
=== Group A ===
==== Standings ====
Pos	Team	Pld	W	L	Pts	SW	SL	SR	SPW	SPL	SPR	Qualification
1	NU Bulldogs	5	4	1	12	13	4	3.250	414	354	1.169	Semifinals
2	De La Salle Green Archers	5	4	1	12	14	7	2.000	470	449	1.047	Semifinals
3	FEU Tamaraws	5	3	2	10	11	8	1.375	444	404	1.099	
4	Perpetual Altas	5	3	2	7	10	10	1.000	419	428	0.979	
5	Benilde Blazers	5	1	4	4	8	12	0.667	438	469	0.934	
6	PMMS Mariners	5	0	5	0	0	15	0.000	305	386	0.790	

==== Match results ====
- All times are in Philippines Standard Time (UTC+08:00)

Date	Time		Score		Set 1	Set 2	Set 3	Set 4	Set 5	Total	Report
Jul 30	10:00	CSB	1–3	DLS	20–25	25–22	23–25	21–25	–	89–97	
Aug 01	12:00	NUI	3–0	FEU	25–23	25–23	25–22	–	–	75–68	
Aug 03	10:00	UPH	3–0	PMM	25–13	25–17	25–23	–	–	75–53	
Aug 06	12:00	DLS	2–3	UPH	20–25	15–25	25–19	25–14	12–15	97–98	
Aug 08	10:00	PMM	0–3	NUI	18–25	20–25	15–25	–	–	53–75	
Aug 10	12:00	FEU	3–1	CSB	25–17	26–28	25–15	25–21	–	101–81	
Aug 13	10:00	PMM	0–3	FEU	19–25	16–25	23–25	–	–	58–75	
Aug 15	12:00	NUI	1–3	DLS	24–26	19–25	25–18	22–25	–	90–94	
Aug 17	10:00	CSB	2–3	UPH	23–25	23–25	25–14	25–19	12–15	108–98	
Aug 20	12:00	NUI	3–1	CSB	25–16	24–26	25–11	25–21	–	99–74	
Aug 22	10:00	FEU	3–1	UPH	25–23	25–15	20–25	25–20	–	95–83	
Aug 24	12:00	DLS	3–0	PMM	25–23	25–22	25–22	–	–	75–67	
Aug 27	10:00	UPH	0–3	NUI	21–25	22–25	22–25	–	–	65–75	
Aug 29	12:00	PMM	0–3	CSB	17–25	30–32	27–29	–	–	74–86	
Aug 31	10:00	FEU	2–3	DLS	25–20	23–25	24–26	25–21	8–15	105–107	P–4

=== Group B ===
==== Standings ====
Pos	Team	Pld	W	L	Pts	SW	SL	SR	SPW	SPL	SPR	Qualification
1	Ateneo Blue Eagles	5	5	0	15	15	1	15.000	404	311	1.299	Semifinals
2	UST Growling Tigers	5	4	1	10	12	7	1.714	426	389	1.095	Semifinals
3	UP Fighting Maroons	5	3	2	9	11	9	1.222	447	432	1.035	
4	NCBA Wildcats	5	2	3	7	8	11	0.727	427	463	0.922	
5	San Beda Red Lions	5	1	4	3	6	14	0.429	425	483	0.880	
6	EAC Generals	5	0	5	1	5	15	0.333	431	482	0.894	

==== Match results ====
Date	Time		Score		Set 1	Set 2	Set 3	Set 4	Set 5	Total	Report
Jul 30	12:00	UPD	3–1	EAC	23–25	29–27	25–15	25–18	–	102–85	
Aug 01	10:00	UST	3–0	NCB	25–18	25–20	25–13	–	–	75–51	
Aug 03	12:00	ADM	3–0	SBC	25–18	25–20	25–13	–	–	75–51	
Aug 06	10:00	EAC	1–3	ADM	23–25	28–26	20–25	17–25	–	88–101	
Aug 08	12:00	NCB	2–3	UPD	12–25	25–27	25–23	27–25	13–15	102–115	
Aug 10	10:00	SBC	2–3	UST	14–25	26–24	25–23	22–25	13–15	100–112	
Aug 13	12:00	ADM	3–0	NCB	25–20	25–16	28–26	–	–	78–62	
Aug 15	10:00	EAC	2–3	SBC	25–18	25–18	24–26	21–25	12–15	107–102	
Aug 17	12:00	UST	3–2	UPD	25–20	25–21	21–25	22–25	15–13	108–104	
Aug 20	10:00	ADM	3–0	UST	25–16	25–15	25–21	–	–	75–52	
Aug 22	12:00	SBC	0–3	UPD	23–25	19–25	16–25	–	–	58–75	
Aug 24	10:00	NCB	3–1	EAC	25–19	25–21	23–25	25–23	–	98–88	
Aug 27	12:00	SBC	1–3	NCB	20–25	25–23	28–30	34–36	–	107–114	
Aug 29	10:00	UPD	0–3	ADM	21–25	18–25	12–25	–	–	51–75	
Aug 31	12:00	EAC	0–3	UST	20–25	12–25	27–29	–	–	59–79	P–4

== Bracket ==
- All series are best-of-3

Semifinals
A1	NU Bulldogs	3	3
B2	UST Growling Tigers	0	0
B1	Ateneo Blue Eagles	3	3
A2	De La Salle Green Archers	2	0

Finals
Ateneo Blue Eagles	3	3
NU Bulldogs	2	1
3rd place
UST Growling Tigers	3	1
De La Salle Green Archers	0	3

== Third place series ==
Date	Time	Teams	Set	1	2	3	4	5	Total	Report
Sep 07	10:00	UST Growling Tigers	3	25	25	25			75	
Sep 07	10:00	De La Salle Green Archers	0	15	18	23			56	
Sep 12	10:00	UST Growling Tigers	1	16	22	25	21		84	
Sep 12	10:00	De La Salle Green Archers	3	25	25	19	25		94	

== Finals ==
Date	Time	Teams	Set	1	2	3	4	5	Total	Report
Sep 07	12:00	Ateneo Blue Eagles	3	16	25	25	22	15	103	
Sep 07	12:00	NU Bulldogs	2	25	23	18	25	11	102	
Sep 12	12:00	Ateneo Blue Eagles	3	25	18	25	25		93	
Sep 12	12:00	NU Bulldogs	1	14	25	20	20		79	

== Awards ==
- Most valuable player (Finals)
  - Antony Paul Koyfman
- Most valuable player (Conference)
  - Marck Espejo
- Best setter
  - Esmilzo Joner Polvoroza
- Best Outside Spikers
  - Marck Espejo
  - Raymark Woo
- Best middle blockers
  - Rafael del Pilar
  - Kim Malabunga
- Best opposite spiker
  - Madzlan Gampong
- Best libero
  - Lester Kim Sawal

== Final standings ==
Rank	Team
1st place, gold medalist(s)	Ateneo Blue Eagles
2nd place, silver medalist(s)	NU Bulldogs
3rd place, bronze medalist(s)	UST Growling Tigers
4	De La Salle Green Archers
5	FEU Tamaraws
6	UP Fighting Maroons
7	Perpetual Altas
8	NCBA Wildcats
9	Benilde Blazers
10	San Beda Red Lions
11	EAC Generals
12	PMMS Mariners

Spikers' Turf 2nd Season Collegiate Conference
Ateneo Blue Eagles
2nd consecutive title

Team Roster
Lawrence Magadia, Karl Baysa (c), Ron Medalla, Joshua Villanueva, Jasper Tan, Anthony Koyfman, Ysrael Marasigan, Timothy Sto. Tomas, Paolo Trinidad, Rex Intal, Manuel Sumanguid (L), Esmilzo Polvorosa, Marck Espejo, Gian Carlo Glorioso
Oliver Almadro (Head Coach), Jarod Hubalde (Asst. Coach)

Note:
(G) - Guest Player
(c) - Team Captain
(L) - Libero
