= 2015 Shakey's V-League Collegiate Conference =

Shakey's V-League 12th Season Collegiate Conference
Women's Finals	G1	G2	G3	Wins
Ateneo de Manila University	3	0	0	1
National University	0	3	3	2
- Duration: July 11, 2015 - October 4, 2015
- Arena(s): Filoil Flying V Arena, San Juan
- Finals MVP: Myla Pablo
- Winning coach: Roger Gorayeb
- Semifinalists: FEU (Bronze); UST
- TV network(s): GMA News TV (local); GMA Life TV (international)

The 2015 Shakey's V-League Collegiate Conference was the 24th conference of the Shakey's V-League and the second conference of the 2015 season. The opening ceremony was held on July 11, 2015 with the first triple header of volleyball games at the Filoil Flying V Arena in San Juan, Metro Manila. There were twelve (12) competing teams for this conference.

== Tournament format ==
=== Preliminaries (PL) ===
- Twelve (12) participating teams will be divided into two (2) PL groups - Group A & Group B.
- Each pool will play a single round robin.
- The TOP 4 TEAMS PER POOL (or a total of eight (8) teams) will advance to the quarterfinal Round.
- The bottom two (2) per group will be eliminated from the tournament.

=== Quarterfinals (QF) ===
- The eight (8) quarter finalists will be regrouped into one pool.
- The top four (4) teams after a single round robin will advance to the semi-finals round.

=== Semi-finals (SF) ===
- The four (4) semi-finalists will compete against each other in a best-of-three series as follows: Rank 1 vs Rank 4 and Rank 2 vs Rank 3.
- Top two (2) SF teams will compete for GOLD.
- Bottom two (2) SF teams will compete for BRONZE.

=== Finals ===
The battle for GOLD and the battle for BRONZE will both follow the best-of-three format, provided:

- If the battle for GOLD ends in two (2) matches (2-0), then there will no longer be a Game 3 for either GOLD or Bronze. A tie in BRONZE (1-1) will be resolve using FIVB rules.
- A tie in the series for GOLD (1-1) after Game 2 will be broken in a Game 3, regardless of the result of the series in BRONZE.

== Participating teams ==
Abbr.	Group A
AUN	Arellano University Lady Chiefs
FEU	Far Eastern University Lady Tamaraws
NUI	National University Lady Bulldogs
PUP	Polytechnic University of the Philippines Lady Radicals
UBM	University of Batangas Lady Brahmans
UPD	University of the Philippines Lady Maroons

Abbr.	Group B
ADM	Ateneo de Manila University Lady Eagles
CSB	College of Saint Benilde Lady Blazers
LSD	De La Salle University-Dasmariñas Lady Patriots
SSC	San Sebastian College – Recoletos de Manila Lady Stags
TIP	Technological Institute of the Philippines Lady Engineers
UST	University of Santo Tomas Tigresses

== Conference Line-up ==
=== Group A ===
Arellano Lady Chiefs
No.	Player name	Position
1	Mabbayad, Lilet	G
4	Aganon, Carmina	G
5	Ramirez, Rhea Marist	S
6	Ibisa, Jonalyn	L
7	Calixto, Ma. Erica	
8	Tubiera, Menchie	
9	Galang, Jan Eunice	L
11	Carino, Nikka	
13	Saguin, Elaine	
14	Henson, Danna	
15	Legacion, Angelica	S
16	Salamagos, Shirley	
17	Rosario, Cristine Joy (c)	MH
18	Prado, Jovielyn	
	Javier, Roberto	HC

FEU Lady Tamaraws
No.	Player name	Position
1	Hernandez, Carlota	OH
2	Pons, Bernadeth	OH
3	Villareal, Jeanette Virginia	MH
4	Guino-o, Heather Anne	OH
5	Duremdes, Ria Beatriz	L
7	Casugod, Geneveve	MH
8	Cayuna, Maria Angelica	S
9	Palma, Mary Remy Joy (c)	MH
10	Tubino, Honey Royse	G
11	Atienza, Kyla Liana	L
12	Negrito, Kyle Angela	S
15	Malabanan, Jerrili	MH
16	Basas, Toni Rose	OH
18	Gonzaga, Jovelyn	G
	Delos Santos, Cesael	HC

NU Lady Bulldogs
No.	Player name	Position
1	Diolan, Rica	S
2	Perez, Ivy	S
3	Santiago, Alyja Daphne	MH
4	De Leon, Rubie	S
5	General, Fatima Bia	L
6	Doromal, Roma Joy	OH
7	Pablo, Marites	G/OH
9	Urdas, Aiko Sweet	OH
11	Doria, Roselyn	
13	Valdez, Gayle Rose	L
14	Singh, Jorelle (c)	OH
15	Paran, Audrey Kathryn	
16	Manabat, Aleona Denise	G/MH
17	Pablo, Myla	OH
18	Nabor, Jasmine	OH
	Gorayeb, Roger	HC

PUP Lady Radicals
No.	Player name	Position
1	Clemente, Lourdes	G/MH
2	Alvaro, Eula	
3	Tenorio, Ma. Lyca	L
4	Cada, Allison Louise	
5	Ilasco, Alondra	
6	Azucena, Aica	
7	Gallenero, Fritz Joy	G
8	Quintana, Myca Angela	
9	Madrinico, Kristle Encarnacion (c)	S
11	Rebustillo, Remmy	L
12	Delmonte, Princess	
13	Romo, Syra Jane	
14	Ingeniero, Abygail	
17	Araño, Jenny	
	Padilla, Wendell	HC

UBM Lady Brahmans
No.	Player name	Position
2	Tabion, Erika	L
3	Madalogdog, Krissa	
4	Jamilla, Kimberly	
5	Garcia, Lalyn	
6	Montecer, Cyren	
7	Montenegro, Carla	
8	Ramirez, Monalisa	
9	Tan, Hannah Rubie	G
10	Maquinto, Glaiza	L
11	Larcia, Hershey	
12	Estrella, Neslyn	
13	Casteor, Ronnalie Dawn (c)	G/S
14	Romero, Rose Anne	G
15	Gallardo, Razelle	
	Quizon, Christopher	HC

UPD Lady Maroons
No.	Player name	Position
1	Lai, Jewel Hannah (c)	S
2	Basarte, Mae Angeli	S
3	Layug, Maristella	MH
4	Ilustre, Arrianne	OP
5	Ong, Chester Tanika	MH
8	Cailing, Rose Mary	S
10	Molde, Isa	OH
11	Buitre, Marian	MH
12	Gaiser, Princess	L
13	Dorog, Justine	OH
14	Chopitea, Sheena	MH
17	Estrañero, Ma. Arielle	L
18	Carlos, Diana Mae	OP
19	Alinas, Vina	OH
	Yee, Jerry	HC

=== Group B ===
Ateneo Lady Eagles
No.	Player name	Position
1	Lavitoria, Jaime	L/S
2	Valdez, Alyssa (c)	OH
3	Gaston, Pauline Marie Monique	MH
6	Sato, Risa	G/OH
7	Tan, Gizelle	S
8	De Jesus, Jorella Marie	L
9	Tajima, Mary Mae	MH
13	Dungo, Pam	L
14	De Leon, Bea	MH
15	Maraguinot, Jhoanna	OH
16	Ahomiro, Rongomaipapa Amy	MH/OP
17	Madayag, Maddeline	MH
18	Gequillana, Kim	OP
20	Tiangco-Williams, Kayla	G/OH
	Bundit, Anusorn "Tai"	HC

CSB Lady Blazers
No.	Player name	Position
1	Navarro, Jannine	
2	Cheng, Djanel Welch (c)	S
3	Austero, Rachel	
4	Ventura, Dianne	
5	Umali, Chelsea	
6	Panaga, Jeanette	MH
7	Torres, Melanie	
8	Borrero, Jane Frances	
9	Santillan, Chelsea Chloe	
10	Ramos, Kym	
11	Lim, Christine Daynielle	L
12	Dolorito, Ellaine	
13	Enclona, Rica Jane	G/L
17	Musa, Ranya	
	Dumalaog, Alvin	HC

DLSU-D Lady Patriots
No.	Player name	Position
1	Yongco, Iumi (c)	
2	Bartolazo, Frances Dominique	L
3	Lara, Maribeth	
4	Dadang, Desiree	G
5	Abalos, Sigrid	
6	Delfin, Joyce	
7	Galicia, Mara	
8	Tiangco, Myka	S
9	Pasco, Myell Joy	
10	Navidad, Justine	
11	Nunag, Cherry Rose	MH
12	SY, Gie	G/S
13	Amutan, Cindy	L
14	Castillo, Eunice	
	Ramirez, Raymond	HC

SSC-R Lady Stags
No.	Player name	Position
1	Arabe, Nikka	
2	Crisostomo, Trisha Mae	
3	Cruz, Charmine	
5	Soltones, Grethcel (c)	OH
8	Dalisay, Nikka Madrid	
9	Guillema, Vira	S
10	Lim, Denice	
11	Sinamban, Mariel	
12	Villegas, Katherine	
13	Labiano, Jolina	
14	Amponin, Danna	
15	Encarnacion, Dangi	
16	Eroa, Alyssa	L
17	Sta. Rita, Joyce	
	Malazo, Clint	HC

TIP Lady Engineers
No.	Player name	Position
1	Espinosa, Sheeka	
2	Soliva, Bhetany	L
3	Mabayao, Eunice	
4	Fidel, Rochelle	
5	Dela Cruz, Michelle	
6	Maturan, Eden Faith	
7	Verano, Michele Catherine (c)	S
8	Pasion, Lara Justine	
9	Acuña, Hezzymel	G
10	Sarmiento, Faye	L
11	Layug, Alyssa Gayle	
12	Maderazo, Christine	
13	Perez, Angelica	G
14	Rosales, Alexandra	
	Paril, Boy	HC

UST Growling Tigresses
No.	Player name	Position
1	Rafael, Alexa	G/OH
2	Francisco, Christine	MH
3	Cortez, Chlodia	OP
4	Verutiao, Sarah Princess	S
6	Lastimosa, Pamela Tricia (c)	OH
7	Hachero, Renalyn Jane	L
8	Tunay, Carmela	OP
9	Laure, Ennajie	OH
10	Cabanos, Alexine	S
12	Dizon, Mildred Thea	OH
15	De Leon, Jessey Laine	MH
16	Rasmo, Patrisha Kim	L
17	Teope, Alyssa	G/S
18	Meneses, Marivic	MH
	Reyes, Emilio Jr.	HC

Legend
G	Guest Player
S	Setter
MH	Middle Hitter
OH	Outside Hitter
OP	Opposite Hitter
L	Libero
(c)	Team Captain
HC	Head coach

== Preliminaries ==
=== Group A ===
Pos	Team	Pld	W	L	Pts	SW	SL	SR	SPW	SPL	SPR	Qualification
1	National University	5	4	1	12	13	4	3.250	413	358	1.154	Quarterfinals
2	Far Eastern University	5	4	1	12	12	4	3.000	387	312	1.240	Quarterfinals
3	Arellano University	5	4	1	12	12	5	2.400	431	260	1.658	Quarterfinals
4	University of the Philippines	5	2	3	6	8	10	0.800	411	421	0.976	Quarterfinals
5	University of Batangas	5	1	4	3	4	13	0.308	321	419	0.766	Eliminated
6	Polytechnic University of the Philippines	5	0	5	0	1	15	0.067	264	397	0.665	Eliminated

==== Match results ====
Date	Time		Score		Set 1	Set 2	Set 3	Set 4	Set 5	Total	Report
07/11	15:00	FEU	3–0	UBM	25–20	25–18	25–10			75–48	P2
07/12	12:45	UPD	1–3	NUI	25–23	17–25	21–25	18–25		81–98	P2
07/12	17:00	AUN	3–0	PUP	25–17	25–6	25–12			75–35	P2
07/18	17:00	PUP	0–3	UPD	15–25	14–25	13–25			42–75	P2
07/19	15:00	NUI	3–0	UBM	25–16	25–14	25–19			75–49	P2
07/19	17:00	FEU	3–1	AUN	25–23	21–25	25–21	25–16		96–85	P2
07/25	12:45	AUN	3–1	NUI	25–23	25–18	19–25	25–22		94–88	P2
07/25	15:00	FEU	3–0	PUP	25–16	25–14	25–14			75–44	P2
07/26	12:45	UBM	1–3	UPD	26–24	19–25	19–25	20–25		84–99	P2
08/01	15:00	UBM	0–3	AUN	4–25	23–25	15–25			42–75	P2
08/02	12:45	UPD	0–3	FEU	20–25	20–25	19–25			59–75	P2
08/02	17:00	PUP	0–3	NUI	15–25	18–25	15–25			48–75	P2
08/08	12:45	NUI	3–0	FEU	25–23	26–24	25–19			76–66	P2
08/08	15:00	AUN	3–1	UPD	25–23	27–29	25–23	25–22		102–97	P2
08/09	15:00	PUP	1–3	UBM	25–19	22–25	22–25	26–28		95–97	P2

=== Group B ===
Pos	Team	Pld	W	L	Pts	SW	SL	SR	SPW	SPL	SPR	Qualification
1	Ateneo de Manila University	5	5	0	14	15	3	5.000	427	317	1.347	Quarterfinals
2	University of Santo Tomas	5	4	1	11	13	7	1.857	461	386	1.194	Quarterfinals
3	College of Saint Benilde	5	2	3	9	12	10	1.200	455	450	1.011	Quarterfinals
4	De La Salle University-Dasmariñas	5	2	3	6	9	11	0.818	400	448	0.893	Quarterfinals
5	San Sebastian College – Recoletos	5	1	4	3	3	13	0.231	333	392	0.849	Eliminated
6	Technological Institute of the Philippines	5	1	4	2	6	14	0.429	392	466	0.841	Eliminated

==== Match results ====
Date	Time		Score		Set 1	Set 2	Set 3	Set 4	Set 5	Total	Report
07/11	12:45	UST	1–3	ADM	11–25	25–27	25–19	20–25		81–96	P2
07/11	17:00	SSC	0–3	CSB	18–25	24–26	11–25			53–76	P2
07/12	15:00	TIP	3–2	LSD	20–25	17–25	25–23	25–20	15–8	102–101	P2
07/18	12:45	LSD	1–3	UST	13–25	12–25	25–23	18–25		68–98	P2
07/18	15:00	CSB	3–1	TIP	25–16	25–21	19–25	25–22		94–84	P2
07/19	12:45	ADM	3–0	SSC	25–17	25–13	25–21			75–51	P2
07/25	17:00	SSC	3–1	TIP	25–22	25–22	22–25	25–19		97–88	P2
07/26	15:00	UST	3–2	CSB	25–12	17–25	25–21	26–28	15–7	108–93	P2
07/26	17:00	ADM	3–0	LSD	25–13	25–19	25–22			75–54	P2
08/01	12:45	CSB	2–3	ADM	25–23	25–18	8–25	20–25	10–15	88–106	P2
08/01	17:00	LSD	3–0	SSC	27–25	26–24	25–20			78–69	P2
08/02	15:00	TIP	1–3	UST	16–25	19–25	26–24	14–25		75–99	P2
08/08	17:00	ADM	3–0	TIP	25–16	25–14	25–13			75–43	P2
08/09	12:45	SSC	0–3	UST	22–25	15–25	17–25			54–75	P2
08/09	17:00	CSB	2–3	LSD	19–25	21–25	25–15	25–18	14–16	104–99	P2

== Quarterfinals ==
Pos	Team	Pld	W	L	Pts	SW	SL	SR	SPW	SPL	SPR	Qualification
1	Ateneo de Manila University	7	7	0	20	21	5	4.200	613	494	1.241	Semifinals
2	National University	7	5	2	15	17	7	2.429	576	518	1.112	Semifinals
3	Far Eastern University	7	5	2	14	15	9	1.667	549	467	1.176	Semifinals
4	University of Santo Tomas	7	4	3	10	15	16	0.938	595	594	1.002	Semifinals
5	Arellano University	7	3	4	11	13	14	0.929	619	530	1.168	Eliminated
6	University of the Philippines	7	2	5	7	14	16	0.875	586	616	0.951	Eliminated
7	College of Saint Benilde	7	1	6	5	8	17	0.471	579	663	0.873	Eliminated
8	De La Salle University-Dasmariñas	7	1	6	2	4	20	0.200	405	577	0.702	Eliminated

=== Match results ===
Date	Time		Score		Set 1	Set 2	Set 3	Set 4	Set 5	Total	Report
08/15	12:45	NUI	3–0	LSD	25-17	25-19	25-17			75–0	P2
08/15	15:00	ADM	3–1	UPD	25-18	26-24	20-25	25-15		96–0	P2
08/16	12:45	FEU	3–0	CSB	25-21	25-6	25-17			75–0	P2
08/16	15:00	UST	3–2	AUN	25-21	25-22	19-25	24-26	15–10	108–10	P2
08/22	12:45	UPD	2-3	UST	18-25	25-17	25-23	18-25	15-9	101–0	P2
08/22	15:00	AUN	0–3	ADM	14–25	17–25	19–25			50–75	P2
08/23	12:45	CSB	0–3	NUI	19-25	21-25	18–25			58–25	P2
08/23	15:00	LSD	0–3	FEU	7-25	11-25	15-25			33–0	P2
08/29	12:45	FEU	0–3	ADM	19-25	14-25	18-25			51–0	P2
08/29	15:00	LSD	0–3	AUN	20-25	17-25	15-25			52–0	P2
08/30	12:45	NUI	3–0	UST	25-22	25–23	25–11			75–34	P2
08/30	15:00	CSB	1–3	UPD	25–18	16–25	19–25	19–25		79–93	P2
09/05	12:45	ADM	3–1	NUI	15–25	25–19	25–21	25–23		90–88	P2
09/05	15:00	UST	2–3	FEU	16-25	25-19	29-27	15-25	10-15	95–0	P2
09/06	12:45	UPD	3–0	LSD	25-18	25-10	25-18			75–0	P2
09/06	15:00	AUN	2–3	CSB	25–23	27–25	22–25	23–25	10–15	107–113	P2

== Semifinals ==
- Ranking is based from the quarter-finals round.
- All series are best-of-3

Semi-finals
ADM	2
UST	1
NUI	2
FEU	0

Final
ADM	1
NUI	2
Third place
UST	0
FEU	2

=== Rank 1 vs Rank 4 ===
Date	Time		Score		Set 1	Set 2	Set 3	Set 4	Set 5	Total	Report
09/12	12:45	ADM	3–0	UST	27–25	25–16	25–17			77–58	P2
09/13	15:00	UST	3–1	ADM	18–25	25–16	25–23	25–22		93–86	P2
09/16	16:00	ADM	3–0	UST	25–18	25–18	25–19			75–55	P2

- Ateneo de Manila University advances to the final round.

=== Rank 2 vs Rank 3 ===
Date	Time		Score		Set 1	Set 2	Set 3	Set 4	Set 5	Total	Report
09/12	15:00	NUI	3–1	FEU	25–15	25–22	25–27	25–23		100–87	P2
09/13	12:45	FEU	1–3	NUI	25–20	13–25	21–25	16–25		75–95	P2

- National University advances to the final round.
- Far Eastern University & University of Santo Tomas will compete for the 3rd place (BRONZE).

== Finals ==
=== Battle for Bronze ===
September 19, 2015; 12:45	University of Santo Tomas	1–3	Far Eastern University	Filoil Flying V Arena; Attendance: 561; Referees: P. Sison & R. Rojas
September 19, 2015; 12:45	(17–25, 17–25, 25–10, 20–25); Match Result P2			Filoil Flying V Arena; Attendance: 561; Referees: P. Sison & R. Rojas

September 26, 2015; 12:45	Far Eastern University	3–0	University of Santo Tomas	Filoil Flying V Arena; Attendance: 672; Referees: R. Rojas & L. Benito
September 26, 2015; 12:45	(25–16, 25–23, 25–17); Match Result P2			Filoil Flying V Arena; Attendance: 672; Referees: R. Rojas & L. Benito

Far Eastern University wins the series in two games

=== Battle for Gold ===
September 20, 2015; 12:45	Ateneo de Manila University	3–0	National University	Filoil Flying V Arena; Attendance: 2,814; Referees: R. Roxas & P. Sison
September 20, 2015; 12:45	(25–19, 25–13, 25–21); Match Result P2			Filoil Flying V Arena; Attendance: 2,814; Referees: R. Roxas & P. Sison

September 27, 2015; 12:45	National University	3–0	Ateneo de Manila University	Filoil Flying V Arena; Attendance: 4,525; Referees: J. del Rosario & L. Benito
September 27, 2015; 12:45	(25–22, 25–17, 25–17); Match Result P2			Filoil Flying V Arena; Attendance: 4,525; Referees: J. del Rosario & L. Benito

October 4, 2015; 12:45	Ateneo de Manila University	0–3	National University	Filoil Flying V Arena; Attendance: 4,582; Referees: L. Benito & R. Rojas
October 4, 2015; 12:45	(21–25, 24–26, 19–25); Match Result P2			Filoil Flying V Arena; Attendance: 4,582; Referees: L. Benito & R. Rojas

National University wins the series in three games

== Awards ==
- Most valuable player (Finals)
  - Myla Pablo
- Most valuable player (Conference)
  - Alyssa Valdez
- Best setter
  - Gizelle Tan
- Best Outside Spikers
  - Alyssa Valdez
  - Ennajie Laure
- Best middle blockers
  - Jaja Santiago
  - Bea de Leon
- Best opposite spiker
  - Jovelyn Gonzaga
- Best libero
  - Fatima Bia General

== Final standings ==
Rank	Team
1st place, gold medalist(s)	National University Lady Bulldogs
2nd place, silver medalist(s)	Ateneo de Manila University Lady Eagles
3rd place, bronze medalist(s)	Far Eastern University Lady Tamaraws
4	University of Santo Tomas Tigresses
5	Arellano University Lady Chiefs
6	University of the Philippines Lady Maroons
7	College of Saint Benilde Lady Blazers
8	De La Salle University-Dasmariñas Lady Patriots
9	University of Batangas Lady Brahmans
10	San Sebastian College – Recoletos de Manila Lady Stags
11	Technological Institute of the Philippines Lady Engineers
12	Polytechnic University of the Philippines Lady Radicals

Shakey's V-League 12th Season Collegiate Conference Champions
National University Lady Bulldogs
2nd title

Team roster

Rica Diolan, Ivy Perez, Jaja Santiago, Rubie de Leon (G), Fatima General (L), Roma Doromal, Maritess Pablo, Aiko Urdas, Roselyn Doria, Gayle Valdez (L), Jorelle Singh (c), Audrey Paran, Dindin Manabat (G), Myla Pablo, Jasmine Nabor
Roger Gorayeb (Head Coach), Edjet Mabayad (Asst. Coach)

Note
(G) - Guest Player
((c)) - Team Captain
(L) - Libero

== See also ==
- Spikers' Turf 1st Season Collegiate Conference
- Shakey's V-League conference results
