= UAAP Season 76 volleyball tournaments =

Volleyball tournaments

UAAP Season 76 Volleyball
- Host school: Adamson University
Men's Finals	G1	G2	Wins
NU Bulldogs	3	3	2
Ateneo Blue Eagles	0	1	0
- Duration: March 1–5, 2014
- Arena: Smart Araneta Coliseum
- Finals MVP: Reuben Inaudito
- Winning coach: Dante Alinsunurin
- Semifinalists: FEU Tamaraws; Adamson Soaring Falcons
- TV networks: ABS-CBN Sports+Action, The Filipino Channel, Balls, Balls HD
Women's Finals	G1	G2	G3	G4	Wins
De La Salle Lady Archers	1	3	2	0	1+1
Ateneo Lady Eagles	3	1	3	3	3
- Duration: March 5–15, 2014
- Arenas: Smart Araneta Coliseum; Mall of Asia Arena
- Finals MVP: Alyssa Valdez
- Winning coach: Anusorn Bundit
- Semifinalists: NU Lady Bulldogs; Adamson Lady Falcons
- TV networks: ABS-CBN, ABS-CBN Sports+Action, The Filipino Channel, Balls, Balls HD

The seniors' division of the UAAP Season 76 volleyball tournaments opened December 1, 2013. Tournaments are hosted by Adamson University. Tournament games are held at the Filoil Flying V Arena in San Juan, the Mall of Asia Arena in Pasay and the Smart Araneta Coliseum in Quezon City.

== Men's tournament ==
=== Elimination round ===
==== Team standings ====
Pos	Team	Pld	W	L	Pts	SW	SL	SR	SPW	SPL	SPR	Qualification
1	NU Bulldogs	14	12	2	32	37	15	2.467	1205	1038	1.161	Semifinals with a twice-to-beat advantage
2	Ateneo Blue Eagles	14	11	3	32	36	18	2.000	1261	1145	1.101	Semifinals with a twice-to-beat advantage
3	FEU Tamaraws	14	9	5	25	31	23	1.348	1210	1188	1.019	Semifinals
4	Adamson Soaring Falcons	14	7	7	21	26	28	0.929	1199	1214	0.988	Semifinals
5	De La Salle Green Archers	14	7	7	23	30	26	1.154	1237	1213	1.020	Fourth-seed playoff
6	UST Growling Tigers	14	5	9	16	26	32	0.813	1249	1275	0.980	
7	UP Fighting Maroons	14	4	10	15	21	33	0.636	1152	1217	0.947	
8	UE Red Warriors	14	1	13	4	8	40	0.200	953	1176	0.810	

Rules for classification: Point system: 3 points = win match in 3 or 4 sets; 2 points = win match in 5 sets; 1 point = lose match in 5 sets; 0 point = lose match in 3 or 4 sets

==== Match-up results ====
	Round 1							Round 2						
Team ╲ Game	1	2	3	4	5	6	7	8	9	10	11	12	13	14
ADU	FEU school colors	UE school colors	NU school colors	UST school colors	Ateneo school colors	UP school colors	La Salle school colors	FEU school colors	UE school colors	NU school colors	UP school colors	UST school colors	La Salle school colors	Ateneo school colors
ADMU	UE school colors	FEU school colors	UP school colors	Adamson school colors	NU school colors	La Salle school colors	UST school colors	NU school colors	La Salle school colors	FEU school colors	UE school colors	UST school colors	UP school colors	Adamson school colors
DLSU	NU school colors	UP school colors	FEU school colors	UE school colors	UST school colors	Ateneo school colors	Adamson school colors	UP school colors	Ateneo school colors	UST school colors	FEU school colors	NU school colors	Adamson school colors	UE school colors
FEU	Adamson school colors	Ateneo school colors	La Salle school colors	UP school colors	UE school colors	UST school colors	NU school colors	Adamson school colors	UST school colors	Ateneo school colors	La Salle school colors	UP school colors	UE school colors	NU school colors
NU	La Salle school colors	UST school colors	Adamson school colors	Ateneo school colors	UP school colors	UE school colors	FEU school colors	Ateneo school colors	UP school colors	Adamson school colors	UST school colors	La Salle school colors	UE school colors	FEU school colors
UE	Ateneo school colors	Adamson school colors	UST school colors	La Salle school colors	FEU school colors	NU school colors	UP school colors	UST school colors	Adamson school colors	UP school colors	Ateneo school colors	FEU school colors	NU school colors	La Salle school colors
UP	UST school colors	La Salle school colors	Ateneo school colors	FEU school colors	NU school colors	Adamson school colors	UE school colors	La Salle school colors	NU school colors	UE school colors	Adamson school colors	FEU school colors	Ateneo school colors	UST school colors
UST	UP school colors	NU school colors	UE school colors	Adamson school colors	La Salle school colors	FEU school colors	Ateneo school colors	UE school colors	FEU school colors	La Salle school colors	NU school colors	Ateneo school colors	Adamson school colors	UP school colors

= Win; = Loss

==== Game results ====
Results to the right and top of the black cells are first round games, those to the left and below are second round games.

Team	AdU	ADMU	DLSU	FEU	NU	UE	UP	UST
Adamson		0–3	3–1	3–1	0–3	3–1	3–2	2–3
Ateneo	3–1		3–2	0–3	2–3	3–0	1–3	3–1
La Salle	3–1	2–3		1–3	0–3	3–0	3–1	2–3
FEU	3–0	1–3	0–3		2–3	3–2	3–2	3–1
NU	3–1	0–3	1–3	3–0		3–0	3–0	3–0
UE	0–3	0–3	3–1	0–3	0–3		1–3	0–3
UP	1–3	1–3	0–3	0–3	2–3	3–0		3–1
UST	1–3	0–3	2–3	2–3	2–3	3–1	3–0	

Legend: Blue = left column team win; Red = top row team win.

=== Bracket ===
Fourth-seed playoff
La Salle	0
Adamson	3

Semifinals; Top seeds twice-to-beat
1	NU	3
4	Adamson	0
2	Ateneo	3
3	FEU	2

Finals; Best-of-three series
1	NU	3	3
2	Ateneo	0	1

=== Fourth–seed playoff ===
Adamson and La Salle, which are tied at fourth place, played for the #4 seed, the last berth to the Final Four of the playoffs.

Elimination round games:

- January 15: La Salle (1–3) Adamson at the Filoil Flying V Arena (19–25, 18–25, 25–23, 15–25)
- February 12: La Salle (3–1) Adamson at the Filoil Flying V Arena (25–19, 25–21, 21–25, 25–18)

February 19; 02:00 PM (UTC+08:00)	De La Salle Green Archers	0–3	Adamson Soaring Falcons	Filoil Flying V Arena, San Juan
February 19; 02:00 PM (UTC+08:00)	(20–25, 25–27, 23–25)			Filoil Flying V Arena, San Juan

=== Semifinals ===
==== NU vs Adamson ====
Elimination round games:

- December 11: NU (3–0) Adamson at the Filoil Flying V Arena (25–20, 25–19, 25–22)
- January 29: NU (3–1) Adamson at the Filoil Flying V Arena (25–21, 24–26, 25–15, 25–17)

February 26; 02:00 PM (UTC+08:00)	NU Bulldogs	3–0	Adamson Soaring Falcons	Filoil Flying V Arena, San Juan
February 26; 02:00 PM (UTC+08:00)	(25–19, 25–19, 25–18)			Filoil Flying V Arena, San Juan

==== Ateneo vs FEU ====
Elimination round games:

- December 7: Ateneo (0–3) FEU at the Filoil Flying V Arena (26–28, 21–25, 26–28)
- January 18: Ateneo (3–1) FEU at the Filoil Flying V Arena (23–25, 26–24, 25–19, 25–21)

February 22; 02:00 PM (UTC+08:00)	Ateneo Blue Eagles	3–2	FEU Tamaraws	Filoil Flying V Arena, San Juan
February 22; 02:00 PM (UTC+08:00)	(23–25, 19–25, 25–17, 28–26, 15–13)			Filoil Flying V Arena, San Juan

=== Finals ===
Elimination round games:

- January 4: NU (3–2) Ateneo at the Filoil Flying V Arena (17–25, 25–21, 25–20, 18–25, 15–9)
- January 18: NU (0–3) Ateneo at the Filoil Flying V Arena (21–25, 24–26, 23–25)

March 1; 02:00 PM (UTC+08:00)	NU Bulldogs	3–0	Ateneo Blue Eagles	Smart Araneta Coliseum, Quezon City
March 1; 02:00 PM (UTC+08:00)	(29–27, 25–22, 25–22)			Smart Araneta Coliseum, Quezon City

March 5; 02:00 PM (UTC+08:00)	NU Bulldogs	3–1	Ateneo Blue Eagles	Smart Araneta Coliseum, Quezon City
March 5; 02:00 PM (UTC+08:00)	(25–22, 21–25, 25–23, 27–25)			Smart Araneta Coliseum, Quezon City

=== Awards ===
UAAP Season 76 men's volleyball champions
NU Bulldogs
Second title, second consecutive title

- Most valuable player (Season): Marck Jesus Espejo (Ateneo de Manila University)
- Most valuable player (Finals): Reuben Inaudito (National University)
- Rookie of the Year: Marck Jesus Espejo (Ateneo de Manila University)
- Best scorer: Mark Gil Alfafara (University of Santo Tomas)
- Best attacker: Mark Gil Alfafara (University of Santo Tomas)
- Best blocker: Julius Evan Raymundo (University of the Philippines)
- Best digger: Rence Melgar (Adamson University)
- Best receiver: John Paul Pareja (Ateneo de Manila University)
- Best server: Mark Gil Alfafara (University of Santo Tomas)
- Best setter: Esmilzo Joner Polvorosa (Ateneo de Manila University)

== Women's tournament ==
=== Season's team line-up ===
ADAMSON LADY FALCONS
No.	Player name	Position
1	PINEDA, Shiela Marie	OH
4	PAAT, Mylene	MH
5	ZAPANTA, Luisa Mae	OH
6	VILLANUEVA, Amanda Maria	OP
7	TEMPIATURA, Jellie	L
8	EMNAS, Fenela Risha	S
9	GUEVARA, Faye Janelle	MH
10	VELASCO, Ana Johnuel	OH
11	LISTANA, Princess Aimee	L/OH
12	GALANZA, Jessica Margarett	OH
14	MACATUNO, May Jennifer	S
15	CORTEL, Marleen (c)	OP
16	LEBUMFACIL, Keith Dempoll	S/L
17	ALKUINO, Maria Erika Gel	MH

ATENEO LADY EAGLES
No.	Player name	Position
1	PATNONGON, Aerieal	MH
2	VALDEZ, Alyssa (c)	OH
3	MORENTE, Michelle Kathleen	OP
4	GOPICO, Ana Laureen	MH
5	TAJIMA, Mary Mae	MH
7	TAN, Maria Gizelle Jessica	S
8	DE JESUS, Jorella Marie	OH
10	TEJADA, Margarita Anna Marie	MH
11	FAUSTINO, Natasha Graciela	S
12	MORADO, Julia Melissa	S
13	LAZARO, Dennise Michelle	L
14	GEQUILLANA, Kassandra Miren	OH
16	AHOMIRO, Rongomaipapa Amy	OP/MH
17	TAN, Maria Beatriz Dominique	OP

DLSU LADY SPIKERS
No.	Player name	Position
1	ESPERANZA, Maria Mikaela	S
2	MARAÑO, Abigail (c)	MH
3	REYES, Mika Aereen	MH
4	CERVEZA, Carol Ann	MH
5	MACANDILI, Dawn Nicole	L
6	CHENG, Desiree Wynea	OP
7	CRUZ, Camille Mary Arielle	OH
8	GALANG, Victonara	OH
9	FAJARDO, Kim	S
10	BARON, Mary Joy	MH
11	DY, Kim Kianna	OH
12	TAN, Alexandra Denice	OP
15	CRUZ, Cienne Mary Arielle	L
18	DEMECILLO, Cydthealee	OH

FEU LADY TAMARAWS
No.	Player name	Position
1	AGNO, Christine	L
2	PONS, Bernadeth	OH
3	SIMBORIO, Marie Charlemagne	OH/OP
4	BASAS, Marie Toni	OH
5	TORRES, Glayssa Faith	OP/MH
6	DIONELA, Joannabelle	L
7	CASUGOD, Geneveve	MH
8	DAWSON, Samantha Chloe	OP/OH
9	PALMA, Mary Remy Joy	MH
10	PAPA, Yna Louise	S
11	ATIENZA, Kyla Llana	OH
12	SY, Gyzelle (c)	S
13	ROXAS, Mayjorie	OP
14	AMARO, Rizalie	MH

NU LADY BULLDOGS
No.	Player name	Position
1	VALDEZ, Gayle Rose	OH
2	PEREZ, Ivy Jisel	S
3	SANTIAGO, Alyja Daphne	MH
4	AGANON, Carmina	OH
5	GENERAL, Fatima Bia	L
6	SALIBAD, Precious May	S
7	MANDAPAT, Rizza Jane	OH
8	SALAZAR, Jarene Mae	L
9	URDAS, Aiko Sweet	OP
10	SOLIVEN, Jocelyn	S
12	DADANG, Siemens Desiree	MH
15	DEQUITO, Arianna Belle	MH
16	SANTIAGO, Aleona Denise (c)	MH
17	PABLO, Myla	OH

UE LADY WARRIORS
No.	Player name	Position
1	ADORADOR, Maria Shaya	OP
2	LOPEZ, Liezel	MH
3	HUNGRIANO, Bea Trizzia	S
4	PONON, Abegail	S
5	BULAN, Sarina Faith (c)	OH
6	CAIS, Francislyn	L
7	JUANILLO, Bien Elaine	MH
8	GAVARRA, Madel	OP
9	MANANSALA, Jan Michelle	OH
10	RAMOS, Chellho Grace	MH
11	MIRALLES, Christine	OH/OP
12	SARMIENTO, Pia Gabrielle	L
15	ALCAYDE, Jasmine Gayle	MH
16	DACAYMAT, Angelica	OH/MH

UP LADY MAROONS
No.	Player name	Position
1	ONG, Chester Tanika	OH
2	LEGASPI, Pam Adrienne	OH
3	LAYUG, Alyssa Gayle	MH
5	ARANETA, Angeli Pauline (c)	OP
6	MAGTALAS, Arylle Gimry	S
7	ORTIZ, Monica Maria	OH
8	BERSOLA, Katherine Adrielle	MH
10	TIAMZON, Nicole Anne	S/OP
12	GAISER, Princess Ira	L
14	CALUGCUG, Julienne	OH
15	MANGULABNAN, Hannah Rebecca	OP
16	SE, Princess Mae	MH
17	ESPINOSA, Sheeka Gin	OH
19	ALINAS, Vina Vera	L

UST TIGRESSES
No.	Player name	Position
2	HIROTSUJI, Midori	MH
3	CORTEZ, Chlodia Eiriel	OH
5	GUTIERREZ, Jem Nicole	OH
6	LASTIMOSA, Pamela Tricia	OH
7	SANTOS, Patricia Mae	OH
8	TUNAY, Maria Carmela	OP
10	CABANOS, Alexine Danielle	S
11	RASMO, Patrisha	L
12	DUSARAN, Dancel Jan	L
14	LANTIN, Maria Loren (c)	S
15	DE LEON, Jessey Laine	MH
16	DEPANTE, Julienne Faye	OP
17	PALEC, Shannen	MH
18	MENESES, Marivic Velaine	MH

Legend
S	Setter
MH	Middle hitter
OH	Outside hitter
OP	Opposite hitter
L	Libero
(c)	Team captain

=== Elimination round ===
==== Team standings ====
Pos	Team	Pld	W	L	Pts	SW	SL	SR	SPW	SPL	SPR	Qualification
1	De La Salle Lady Archers	14	14	0	42	42	2	21.000	1090	753	1.448	Finals
2	NU Lady Bulldogs	14	12	2	36	37	9	4.111	1119	940	1.190	Semifinals with a twice-to-beat advantage
3	Ateneo Lady Eagles	14	10	4	28	31	16	1.938	1035	963	1.075	Semifinals
4	Adamson Lady Falcons	14	6	8	19	25	27	0.926	1168	1133	1.031	Semifinals
5	FEU Lady Tamaraws	14	6	8	17	21	28	0.750	1043	1065	0.979	Fourth-seed playoff
6	UST Growling Tigresses	14	5	9	16	18	30	0.600	1030	1075	0.958	
7	UP Lady Maroons	14	3	11	10	12	34	0.353	893	1068	0.836	
8	UE Lady Warriors	14	0	14	0	3	42	0.071	735	1116	0.659	

Rules for classification: Point system: 3 points = win match in 3 or 4 sets; 2 points = win match in 5 sets; 1 point = lose match in 5 sets; 0 point = lose match in 3 or 4 sets

==== Match-up results ====
	Round 1							Round 2						
Team ╲ Game	1	2	3	4	5	6	7	8	9	10	11	12	13	14
AdU	La Salle school colors	UP school colors	Ateneo school colors	UST school colors	UE school colors	NU school colors	FEU school colors	UP school colors	La Salle school colors	UE school colors	Ateneo school colors	FEU school colors	NU school colors	UST school colors
ADMU	NU school colors	FEU school colors	Adamson school colors	UE school colors	UP school colors	UST school colors	La Salle school colors	La Salle school colors	UP school colors	NU school colors	Adamson school colors	UE school colors	UST school colors	FEU school colors
DLSU	Adamson school colors	UST school colors	NU school colors	UP school colors	FEU school colors	Ateneo school colors	UE school colors	Ateneo school colors	Adamson school colors	FEU school colors	UP school colors	UST school colors	UE school colors	NU school colors
FEU	UE school colors	Ateneo school colors	UP school colors	NU school colors	La Salle school colors	UST school colors	Adamson school colors	NU school colors	UE school colors	La Salle school colors	UST school colors	Adamson school colors	UP school colors	Ateneo school colors
NU	Ateneo school colors	UE school colors	La Salle school colors	FEU school colors	UST school colors	UP school colors	Adamson school colors	FEU school colors	UST school colors	Ateneo school colors	UE school colors	UP school colors	Adamson school colors	La Salle school colors
UE	FEU school colors	NU school colors	UST school colors	Ateneo school colors	Adamson school colors	UP school colors	La Salle school colors	UST school colors	FEU school colors	Adamson school colors	NU school colors	Ateneo school colors	La Salle school colors	UP school colors
UP	UST school colors	Adamson school colors	FEU school colors	La Salle school colors	Ateneo school colors	NU school colors	UE school colors	Adamson school colors	Ateneo school colors	UST school colors	La Salle school colors	NU school colors	FEU school colors	UE school colors
UST	UP school colors	La Salle school colors	UE school colors	Adamson school colors	NU school colors	Ateneo school colors	FEU school colors	UE school colors	NU school colors	UP school colors	FEU school colors	La Salle school colors	Ateneo school colors	Adamson school colors

= Win; = Loss

==== Game results ====
Results to the right and top of the black cells are first round games, those to the left and below are second round games.

Team	AdU	ADMU	DLSU	FEU	NU	UE	UP	UST
Adamson		0–3	0–3	2–3	1–3	3–1	3–2	3–0
Ateneo	3–2		0–3	3–0	0–3	3–0	3–0	3–2
La Salle	3–0	3–0		3–0	3–0	3–0	3–0	3–0
FEU	1–3	0–3	1–3		0–3	3–0	3–0	3–1
NU	3–1	3–1	1–3	3–0		3–0	3–0	3–0
UE	0–3	0–3	0–3	1–3	0–3		0–3	0–3
UP	0–3	0–3	0–3	3–1	0–3	3–0		1–3
UST	3–1	0–3	0–3	0–3	0–3	3–1	3–0	

Legend: Blue = left column team win; Red = top row team win.

=== Bracket ===
4th–seed playoff (One–game playoff)
4	Adamson	3
5	FEU	2

First round (One–game playoff)
3	Ateneo	3
4	Adamson	0

Semifinals (No. 2 seed has twice-to-beat advantage)
2	NU	1	1
3	Ateneo	3	3

Finals (#1 seed has 1-0 lead in a best-of-5 series)
1	La Salle	1	3	2	0
3	Ateneo	3	1	3	3

=== Fourth–seed playoff ===
Adamson and FEU, which are tied at fourth place, played for the #4 seed, the last berth to the first round of the playoffs.

Elimination round games:

- January 15: Adamson (2–3) FEU at the Filoil Flying V Arena (21–25, 20–25, 31–29, 25–19, 10–15)
- February 5: Adamson (3–1) FEU at the Filoil Flying V Arena (25–15, 17–25, 25–17, 25–23)

February 19; 03:30 PM (UTC+08:00)	Adamson Lady Falcons	3–2	FEU Lady Tamaraws	Filoil Flying V Arena, San Juan
February 19; 03:30 PM (UTC+08:00)	(25–17, 23–25, 23–25, 25–13, 15–11)			Filoil Flying V Arena, San Juan

=== First round ===
Elimination round games:

- December 15: Ateneo (3–0) Adamson at the Filoil Flying V Arena (25–23, 25–21, 25–18)
- February 1: Ateneo (3–2) Adamson at the Filoil Flying V Arena (25–22, 25–19, 16–25, 18–25, 15–13)

February 22; 03:30 PM (UTC+08:00)	Ateneo Lady Eagles	3–0	Adamson Lady Falcons	Filoil Flying V Arena, San Juan
February 22; 03:30 PM (UTC+08:00)	(26–24, 25–23, 25–21)			Filoil Flying V Arena, San Juan

=== Semifinal ===
Elimination round games:

- December 1: NU (3–0) Ateneo at the Filoil Flying V Arena (25–17, 25–22, 25–17)
- January 26: NU (3–1) Ateneo at the Filoil Flying V Arena (25–17, 25–17, 23–25, 25–19)

February 26; 04:00 PM (UTC+08:00)	NU Lady Bulldogs	1–3	Ateneo Lady Eagles	Filoil Flying V Arena, San Juan
February 26; 04:00 PM (UTC+08:00)	(17–25, 25–12, 29–31, 26–28)			Filoil Flying V Arena, San Juan

March 1; 03:30 PM (UTC+08:00)	NU Lady Bulldogs	1–3	Ateneo Lady Eagles	Smart Araneta Coliseum, Quezon City
March 1; 03:30 PM (UTC+08:00)	(22–25, 25–8, 19–25, 22–25)			Smart Araneta Coliseum, Quezon City

=== Finals ===
Elimination round games:

- January 12: La Salle (3–0) Ateneo at the Mall of Asia Arena (25–16, 25–20, 25–16)
- January 19: La Salle (3–0) Ateneo at the Filoil Flying V Arena (25–14, 25–14, 25–19)

La Salle has the thrice-to-beat advantage after sweeping the elimination round.

March 5; 04:00 PM (UTC+08:00)	De La Salle Lady Archers	1–3	Ateneo Lady Eagles	Smart Araneta Coliseum, Quezon City; Attendance: 19,893; Referees: Yul Benosa (IR) & Jasper Jimenez (NR)
March 5; 04:00 PM (UTC+08:00)	(25–17, 23–25, 13–25, 20–25)			Smart Araneta Coliseum, Quezon City; Attendance: 19,893; Referees: Yul Benosa (IR) & Jasper Jimenez (NR)

March 8; 04:00 PM (UTC+08:00)	De La Salle Lady Archers	3–1	Ateneo Lady Eagles	Smart Araneta Coliseum, Quezon City; Attendance: 17,105; Referees: Nestor Bello (IR) & Bob Malenab (NR)
March 8; 04:00 PM (UTC+08:00)	(25–14, 25–20, 19–25, 26–24)			Smart Araneta Coliseum, Quezon City; Attendance: 17,105; Referees: Nestor Bello (IR) & Bob Malenab (NR)

March 12; 04:00 PM (UTC+08:00)	De La Salle Lady Archers	2–3	Ateneo Lady Eagles	Mall of Asia Arena, Pasay; Attendance: 18,095; Referees: Bob Malenab (NR) & Jasper Jimenez (NR)
March 12; 04:00 PM (UTC+08:00)	(21–25, 23–25, 25–18, 25–16, 15–17)			Mall of Asia Arena, Pasay; Attendance: 18,095; Referees: Bob Malenab (NR) & Jasper Jimenez (NR)

March 15; 03:30 PM (UTC+08:00)	De La Salle Lady Archers	0–3	Ateneo Lady Eagles	Mall of Asia Arena, Pasay; Attendance: 21,314; Referees: Yul Benosa (IR) & Nestor Bello (IR)
March 15; 03:30 PM (UTC+08:00)	(23–25, 24–26, 21–25)			Mall of Asia Arena, Pasay; Attendance: 21,314; Referees: Yul Benosa (IR) & Nestor Bello (IR)

=== Awards ===
UAAP Season 76 women's volleyball champions
Ateneo Lady Eagles
First title

- Most valuable player (Season): Alyssa Valdez (Ateneo De Manila University)
- Most valuable player (Finals): Alyssa Valdez (Ateneo De Manila University)
- Rookie of the Year: Jaja Santiago (National University)
- Best scorer: Alyssa Valdez (Ateneo De Manila University)
- Best attacker: Dindin Santiago (National University)
- Best blocker: Katherine Adrielle Bersola (University of the Philippines)
- Best digger: Dennise Michelle Lazaro (Ateneo De Manila University)
- Best receiver Dennise Michelle Lazaro (Ateneo De Manila University)
- Best server: Alyssa Valdez (Ateneo de Manila University)
- Best setter: Kim Fajardo (De La Salle University)

== Boys' tournament ==
=== Elimination round ===
==== Team standings ====
Pos	Team	Pld	W	L	Pts	SW	SL	SR	SPW	SPL	SPR	Qualification
1	NUNS Bullpups	9	8	1	24	3	0	MAX	0	0	—	Finals
2	UE Junior Red Warriors	9	8	1	24	0	0	—	0	0	—	Finals
3	Ateneo Blue Eaglets	9	6	3	18	9	3	3.000	77	58	1.328	
4	UST Tiger Cubs	9	3	6	9	0	3	0.000	58	77	0.753	
5	Zobel Junior Archers	9	2	7	6	0	0	—	0	0	—	
6	UPIS Junior Fighting Maroons	9	0	9	0	0	0	—	0	0	—	

Rules for classification: Point system: 3 points = win match in 3 or 4 sets; 2 points = win match in 5 sets; 1 point = lose match in 5 sets; 0 point = lose match in 3 or 4 sets

==== Match-up results ====
	Round 1					Round 2				
Team ╲ Game	1	2	3	4	5	6	7	8	9	10
ADMU	NU school colors	UE school colors	UST school colors	UP school colors	La Salle school colors	UST school colors				
DLSU					Ateneo school colors					
NU	Ateneo school colors									
UE		Ateneo school colors								
UP				Ateneo school colors						
UST			Ateneo school colors			Ateneo school colors				

= Win; = Loss

==== Awards ====
UAAP Season 76 boys' volleyball champions
UE Junior Red Warriors
13th title, tenth consecutive title

- Most valuable player: Edward Camposano (University of the East)
- Rookie of the Year: Armel Amuan (National University)
- Best attacker: Edward Camposano (University of the East)
- Best blocker: Kim Adriano (National University)
- Best setter: Adrian Rafael Imperial (University of the East)
- Best server: Ron Adrian Medalla (University of the East)
- Best receiver: Richmond Crisostomo (Ateneo de Manila University)
- Best libero: Manuel Sumanguid III (National University)

== Girls' tournament ==
=== Elimination round ===
==== Team standings ====
Pos	Team	Pld	W	L	Pts	SW	SL	SR	SPW	SPL	SPR	Qualification
1	UST Junior Tigresses	10	9	1	28	2	3	0.667	0	0	—	Finals
2	NUNS Lady Bullpups	10	9	1	26	6	2	3.000	0	0	—	Finals
3	Zobel Junior Lady Archers	9	6	3	18	0	0	—	0	0	—	
4	UE Junior Lady Warriors	9	3	6	9	0	0	—	0	0	—	
5	Adamson Lady Baby Falcons	9	2	7	6	0	3	0.000	0	0	—	
6	UPIS Junior Lady Maroons	9	0	9	0	0	0	—	0	0	—	

Rules for classification: 3 points = win match in 3 or 4 sets; 2 points = win match in 5 sets; 1 point = lose match in 5 sets; 0 point = lose match in 3 or 4 sets

==== Match-up results ====
	Round 1					Round 2				
Team ╲ Game	1	2	3	4	5	6	7	8	9	10
AdU			NU school colors			UST school colors	NU school colors			
DLSU	UP school colors		UST school colors		NU school colors	UST school colors				
NU	UE school colors	UST school colors	Adamson school colors	UP school colors	La Salle school colors	UP school colors	Adamson school colors			
UE	NU school colors	UST school colors								
UP	UST school colors	La Salle school colors				NU school colors				
UST	UP school colors	UE school colors	NU school colors	La Salle school colors	Adamson school colors	Adamson school colors	La Salle school colors			

= Win; = Loss

==== Awards ====
UAAP Season 76 girls' volleyball champions
UST Junior Tigresses
Sixth title

- Most valuable player: Ennajie Laure (University of Santo Tomas)
- Rookie of the Year: Faith Nisperos (National University)
- Best attacker: Ennajie Laure (University of Santo Tomas)
- Best blocker: Pauline Gaston (University of Santo Tomas)
- Best setter: Ejiya Laure (University of Santo Tomas)
- Best server: Marites Pablo (National University)
- Best receiver: Felicia Marie Cui (De La Salle University)
- Best libero: Kristine Magallanes (National University)

== See also ==
- UAAP Season 76

Preceded by Season 75 (2012–13)	UAAP volleyball tournaments Season 76 (2013–14)	Succeeded by Season 77 (2014–15)
