= Ish Polvorosa =

Filipino volleyball player (born 1997)

Personal information
- Full name: Esmilzo Joner Polvorosa
- Nationality: Filipino
- Born: March 22, 1997 (age 29); Imus, Cavite, Philippines
- Height: 181 cm (5 ft 11 in)
- Weight: 79 kg (174 lb)
- Education: Ateneo de Manila University

Volleyball information
- Position: Setter
- Current club: Criss Cross King Crunchers
- Number: 14

Career
Years	Teams
2018	Cignal HD Spikers
2022	VNS–One Alicia
2024–present	Criss Cross King Crunchers

National team
2015–present	Philippines
Honours
Men's volleyball
Representing Philippines
Southeast Asian Games
Silver medal – second place	2019 Manila	Team
ASEAN University Games
Bronze medal – third place	2016 Singapore	Team

Esmilzo Joner "Ish" Polvorosa (born March 22, 1997) is a Filipino volleyball player who plays currently for Criss Cross King Crunchers in the Spikers' Turf and for the Philippine national team.

== Personal life ==
Polvorosa was born and raised in Imus, Cavite. He graduated as second honorable mention at Anabu II Elementary School and studied middle school at Unida Christian Colleges. He took up AB European Studies at Ateneo de Manila University where he played in the Ateneo Blue Eagles volleyball team. He joined the Cignal HD Spikers in 2017. In 2018, he was elected as SK Chairman for Barangay Anabu 2-B in Imus, Cavite. Polvorosa is also a member of the LGBTQ community.

== Clubs ==
- (Philippines) Cignal HD Spikers (2018–2019)
- (Philippines) VNS–One Alicia (2022)
- (Philippines) Criss Cross King Crunchers (2024–present)

== Awards ==
=== Individuals ===
- 2013 UAAP Season 76 "Best Setter"
- 2014 UAAP Season 77 "Best Setter"
- 2014 UAAP Season 77 "Finals Most Valuable Player"
- 2016 UAAP Season 78 "Best Setter"
- 2016 Spikers' Turf Collegiate Conference "Best Setter"
- 2017 UAAP Season 79 "Best Setter"
- 2017 Premier Volleyball League Collegiate Conference "Best Setter"
- 2018 UAAP Season 80 "Best Setter"
- 2024 Spikers' Turf Invitational Conference "Best Setter"
- 2025 Spikers' Turf Open Conference "Best Setter"

=== Collegiate ===
- 2013 UAAP Season 76 - Runners-up, with Ateneo Blue Eagles
- 2014 UAAP Season 77 - Champions, with Ateneo Blue Eagles
- 2015 Spikers' Turf Collegiate Conference - Champions, with Ateneo Blue Eagles
- 2016 UAAP Season 78 - Champions, with Ateneo Blue Eagles
- 2016 Spikers' Turf Collegiate Conference - Champions, with Ateneo Blue Eagles
- 2017 UAAP Season 79 - Champions, with Ateneo Blue Eagles
- 2017 Premier Volleyball League Collegiate Conference - Champions, with Ateneo Blue Eagles
- 2018 UAAP Season 80 - Runners-up, with Ateneo Blue Eagles

=== Club team ===
- 2018 Premier Volleyball League Reinforced Conference - Silver medal, with Cignal HD Spikers
- 2018 Spikers' Turf Open Conference - Bronze medal, with Cignal HD Spikers
- 2019 Spikers' Turf Open Conference - Gold medal, with Cignal HD Spikers
- 2024 Spikers' Turf Open Conference - Silver medal, with Criss Cross King Crunchers
- 2024 Spikers' Turf Invitational Conference - Silver medal, with Criss Cross King Crunchers
- 2025 Spikers' Turf Open Conference - Silver medal, with Criss Cross King Crunchers

=== National team ===
- 2019 Thailand Open Sealect Tuna Championships -, Bronze medal
- 2019 Southeast Asian Games -, Runners-up
