= 2015 Spikers' Turf Collegiate Conference =

- Duration: July 13 – September 27, 2015
- Teams: 12

Results
- Champions: Ateneo Blue Eagles
- Runners-up: NU Bulldogs
- Third place: EAC Generals
- Fourth place: NCBA Wildcats

Awards
- Conference MVP: Marck Espejo
- Finals MVP: Marck Espejo
- Best OH: Howard Mojica; Marck Espejo
- Best MB: Kim Malabunga; Reyson Fuentes
- Best OPP: Ysay Marasigan
- Best Setter: April Pagtalunan
- Best Libero: Ricky Marcos

Spikers' Turf Collegiate Conference chronology
- 2016 >

Spikers' Turf conference chronology
- < 2015 Open 2015 Reinforced >

The 2015 Spikers' Turf Collegiate Conference was the second conference of Spikers' Turf and the 2015 season. The tournament started on July 13, 2015 and ended on September 27, 2015 at the Filoil Flying V Arena in San Juan. There were twelve (12) competing teams in this conference.

== Teams ==
Participating teams
Abbr.	Group A	Abbr.	Group B
EAC	Emilio Aguinaldo College	AUN	Arellano University
FEU	Far Eastern University	ADM	Ateneo de Manila University
NCB	National College of Business and Arts	CSB	College of Saint Benilde
NUI	National University	DLD	De La Salle University - Dasmariñas
MIT	Mapúa Institute of Technology	DLS	De La Salle University – Manila
UEA	University of the East	UPM	University of the Philippines – Diliman

== Format ==
Preliminary round

- In the preliminary round, teams were split into two groups of six.
- The preliminary round was a single round-robin tournament, with each team playing one match against all other teams in their group for a total of five matches.
- The top four teams advanced to the quarterfinals while the bottom two were eliminated.

Quarterfinals

- The quarterfinals was also a single round-robin, with each team playing seven matches in this round.
- The top four teams advanced to the semifinals while the bottom four were eliminated.

Semifinals

- The semifinals featured best-of-three series
- The match-ups were as follows:
  - SF1: QF1 vs. QF4
  - SF2: QF2 vs. QF3
- The winners advanced to the championship while the losers would play in the third-place series.

Finals

- The championship and third-place series were best-of-three series.
- The match-ups were as follows:
  - Championship: Semifinal round winners
  - Third-place series: Semifinal round losers
- If the championship ends after two matches, which can only occur if either team wins 2–0, the third-place series will immediately end even if it is tied. Tiebreakers would be used to determine the winner of the third-place series in this scenario.

== Pool standing procedure ==
- First, teams are ranked by the number of matches won.
- If the number of matches won is tied, the tied teams are then ranked by match points, wherein:
  - Match won 3–0 or 3–1: 3 match points for the winner, 0 match points for the loser.
  - Match won 3–2: 2 match points for the winner, 1 match point for the loser.
- In case of any further ties, the following criteria shall be used:
  - Set ratio: the number of sets won divided by number of sets lost.
  - Point ratio: number of points scored divided by number of points allowed.
  - Head-to-head standings: any remaining tied teams are ranked based on the results of head-to-head matches involving the teams in question.

== Preliminary round ==
=== Group A ===
Pos	Team	Pld	W	L	Pts	SW	SL	SR	SPW	SPL	SPR	Qualification
1	National University	5	5	0	14	15	2	7.500	391	352	1.111	Quarterfinals
2	Emilio Aguinaldo College	5	4	1	12	12	4	3.000	408	338	1.207	Quarterfinals
3	National College of Business & Arts	5	3	2	8	9	10	0.900	393	430	0.914	Quarterfinals
4	Far Eastern University	5	2	3	6	10	12	0.833	479	471	1.017	Quarterfinals
5	Mapúa Institute of Technology	5	1	4	4	6	12	0.500	389	422	0.922	
6	University of the East	5	0	5	1	3	15	0.200	357	424	0.842	

==== Match results ====
Date	Time		Score		Set 1	Set 2	Set 3	Set 4	Set 5	Total	Report
07/13	13:00	National University	3–0	Mapúa Institute of Technology	25–22	25–20	25–22			75–64	P2
07/13	17:00	Far Eastern University	1–3	National College of Business and Arts	18–25	24–26	25–12	16–25		83–88	P2
07/15	17:00	Emilio Aguinaldo College	3–0	University of the East	25–15	25–22	25–21			75–58	P2
07/20	13:00	University of the East	0–3	National University	15–25	22–25	11–25			48–75	P2
07/22	13:00	Far Eastern University	1–3	Emilio Aguinaldo College	25–22	19–25	18–25	25–27		87–99	P2
07/22	17:00	Mapúa Institute of Technology	1–3	National College of Business and Arts	26–24	20–25	24–26	21–25		91–100	P2
07/27	13:00	Emilio Aguinaldo College	3–0	Mapúa Institute of Technology	25–22	26–24	25–17			76–63	P2
07/27	15:00	Far Eastern University	3–1	University of the East	19–25	25–20	25–19	25–18		94–82	P2
07/29	15:00	National College of Business and Arts	0–3	National University	16–25	14–25	23–25			53–75	P2
08/03	15:00	National College of Business and Arts	0–3	Emilio Aguinaldo College	22–25	22–25	22–25			66–75	P2
08/03	17:00	University of the East	0–3	Mapúa Institute of Technology	17–25	23–25	23–25			63–75	P2
08/05	15:00	National University	3–2	Far Eastern University	25–23	19–25	22–25	25–21	15–13	106–107	P2
08/10	13:00	Mapúa Institute of Technology	2–3	Far Eastern University	21–25	25–22	16–25	25–21	9–15	96–108	P2
08/10	15:00	Emilio Aguinaldo College	0–3	National University	20–25	21–25	25–27			66–77	P2
08/12	15:00	University of the East	2–3	National College of Business and Arts	22–25	20–25	25–21	25–18	14–16	106–105	P2

=== Group B ===
Pos	Team	Pld	W	L	Pts	SW	SL	SR	SPW	SPL	SPR	Qualification
1	Ateneo de Manila University	5	5	0	15	15	1	15.000	399	289	1.381	Quarterfinals
2	De La Salle University–Manila	5	4	1	11	12	6	2.000	428	389	1.100	Quarterfinals
3	University of the Philippines–Diliman	5	3	2	10	11	9	1.222	437	413	1.058	Quarterfinals
4	College of Saint Benilde	5	1	4	3	6	12	0.500	362	406	0.892	Quarterfinals
5	Arellano University	5	1	4	3	5	13	0.385	385	425	0.906	
6	De La Salle University–Dasmariñas	5	1	4	3	4	13	0.308	332	419	0.792	

==== Match results ====
Date	Time		Score		Set 1	Set 2	Set 3	Set 4	Set 5	Total	Report
07/13	15:00	University of the Philippines – Diliman	3–1	Arellano University	21–25	25–14	25–23	25–13		96–75	P2
07/15	13:00	De La Salle University – Manila	1–3	Ateneo de Manila University	15–25	25–23	19–25	23–25		82–98	P2
07/15	15:00	De La Salle University – Dasmariñas	0–3	College of Saint Benilde	18–25	18–25	15–25			51–75	P2
07/20	15:00	Ateneo de Manila University	3–0	De La Salle University – Dasmariñas	25–12	25–17	25–13			75–42	P2
07/20	17:00	College of Saint Benilde	1–3	University of the Philippines – Diliman	11–25	19–25	25–18	22–25		77–93	P2
07/22	15:00	Arellano University	0–3	De La Salle University – Manila	17–25	22–25	21–25			60–75	P2
07/27	17:00	University of the Philippines – Diliman	0–3	Ateneo de Manila University	16–25	14–25	21–25			51–75	P2
07/29	13:00	Arellano University	3–1	College of Saint Benilde	17–25	25–20	18–25	18–25		78–95	P2
07/29	17:00	De La Salle University – Manila	3–0	De La Salle University – Dasmariñas	25–17	25–18	25–22			75–57	P2
08/03	13:00	College of Saint Benilde	1–3	De La Salle University – Manila	18–25	19–25	25–17	15–25		77–92	P2
08/05	13:00	De La Salle University – Dasmariñas	1–3	University of the Philippines – Diliman	25–23	16–25	19–25	22–25		82–98	P2
08/05	17:00	Ateneo de Manila University	3–0	Arellano University	26–24	25–18	25–17			76–59	P2
08/10	17:00	Arellano University	1–3	De La Salle University – Dasmariñas	24–26	25–23	23–25	24–26		96–100	P2
08/12	13:00	De La Salle University – Manila	3–2	University of the Philippines – Diliman	25–22	24–26	15–25	25–13	15–13	104–99	P2
08/12	17:00	Ateneo de Manila University	3–0	College of Saint Benilde	25–16	25–18	25–21			75–55	P2

== Quarterfinals ==
Pos	Team	Pld	W	L	Pts	SW	SL	SR	SPW	SPL	SPR	Qualification
1	Ateneo de Manila University	7	7	0	21	21	4	5.250	621	499	1.244	Semifinals
2	National University	7	6	1	17	18	7	2.571	680	577	1.179	Semifinals
3	Emilio Aguinaldo College	7	4	3	13	15	11	1.364	630	562	1.121	Semifinals
4	National College of Business & Arts	8	4	4	10	18	17	1.059	677	706	0.959	Semifinals
5	De La Salle University–Manila	8	3	5	9	13	16	0.813	721	723	0.997	
6	University of the Philippines–Diliman	7	2	5	6	9	18	0.500	571	613	0.931	
7	College of Saint Benilde	7	2	5	5	11	19	0.579	614	687	0.894	
8	Far Eastern University	7	1	6	5	10	19	0.526	617	662	0.932	

=== Match results ===
Date	Time		Score		Set 1	Set 2	Set 3	Set 4	Set 5	Total	Report
08/17	13:00	National University	3–0	University of the Philippines – Diliman	26–24	25–19	26–24			77–67	P2
08/17	15:00	Emilio Aguinaldo College	2–3	College of Saint Benilde	22–25	25–21	25–16	22–25	13–15	107–102	P2
08/17	17:00	Far Eastern University	1–3	Ateneo de Manila University	21–25	19–25	25–22	17–25		82–97	P2
08/19	13:00	Ateneo de Manila University	3–1	Emilio Aguinaldo College	25–21	20–25	25–23	25–23		95–92	P2
08/19	15:00	National College of Business and Arts	3–2	De La Salle University – Manila	25–27	22–25	25–22	25–23	15–9	112–106	P2
08/19	17:00	College of Saint Benilde	1–3	National University	25–22	18–25	26–28	26–28		95–103	P2
08/24	13:00	University of the Philippines – Diliman	0–3	Emilio Aguinaldo College	17–25	23–25	16–25			56–75	P2
08/24	15:00	De La Salle University – Manila	3–0	Far Eastern University	25–20	27–25	25–11			77–56	P2
08/24	17:00	National College of Business and Arts	1–3	Ateneo de Manila University	33–31	18–25	12–25	21–25		84–106	P2
08/26	13:00	Far Eastern University	3–1	University of the Philippines – Diliman	25–23	17–25	26–24	25–23		93–95	P2
08/26	15:00	College of Saint Benilde	2–3	National College of Business and Arts	25–19	25–16	18–25	25–27	17–19	110–106	P2
08/26	17:00	National University	3–1	De La Salle University – Manila	27–25	21–25	25–22	25–18		98–90	P2
08/31	13:00	Far Eastern University	2–3	College of Saint Benilde	25–17	23–25	25–14	23–25	15–17	111–98	P2
08/31	15:00	Ateneo de Manila University	3–0	National University	25–16	25–20	25–17			75–53	P2
09/02	13:00	De La Salle University – Manila	1–3	Emilio Aguinaldo College	23–25	25–23	20–25	24–26		92–99	P2
09/02	15:00	University of the Philippines – Diliman	3–2	National College of Business and Arts	25–21	22–25	25–19	23–25	15–11	110–101	P2

=== Fourth seed playoff ===
As De La Salle and NCBA were tied for fourth place in terms of win–loss record, a fourth seed playoff was held to determine the final semifinal berth.

Date	Time		Score		Set 1	Set 2	Set 3	Set 4	Set 5	Total	Report
09/05	17:00	National College of Business and Arts	3–0	De La Salle University – Manila	30–28	31–29	25–21			86–78	P2

- National College of Business and Arts advances to the semi–finals round.

== Semifinals ==
- Ranking is based from the quarter-final round.
- All series are best-of-3

Semi-finals
Ateneo de Manila University	2
National College of Business and Arts	0
National University	2
Emilio Aguinaldo College	0

Final
Ateneo de Manila University	2
National University	0
Third place
Emilio Aguinaldo College	2
National College of Business and Arts	0

=== Rank 1 vs Rank 4 ===
Date	Time		Score		Set 1	Set 2	Set 3	Set 4	Set 5	Total	Report
09/07	13:00	Ateneo de Manila University	3–0	National College of Business and Arts	25–9	25-22	25–19			75–28	P2
09/09	15:00	National College of Business and Arts	0–3	Ateneo de Manila University	19–25	13–25	22–25			54–75	P2

- Ateneo de Manila University advances to the final round.

=== Rank 2 vs Rank 3 ===
Date	Time		Score		Set 1	Set 2	Set 3	Set 4	Set 5	Total	Report
09/07	15:00	National University	3–2	Emilio Aguinaldo College	25-23	26–28	25–18	26–28	15–11	117–85	P2
09/09	13:00	Emilio Aguinaldo College	1–3	National University	19–25	22–25	25–22	22–25		88–97	P2

- National University advances to the final round.
- [[Emilio Aguinaldo College Generals|Emilio Aguinaldo College]] & National College of Business & Arts will battle for the 3rd place (BRONZE).

== Third place match ==
September 19, 2015; 15:00	Emilio Aguinaldo College	3–0	National College of Business & Arts	Filoil Flying V Arena; Attendance: 674; Referees: L. Benito & J. Villareal
September 19, 2015; 15:00	(25–18, 25–12, 25–14); Match Result P2			Filoil Flying V Arena; Attendance: 674; Referees: L. Benito & J. Villareal

September 26, 2015; 15:00	National College of Business & Arts	0–3	Emilio Aguinaldo College	Filoil Flying V Arena; Attendance: 541; Referees: J. Villareal & P. Sison
September 26, 2015; 15:00	(14–25, 21–25, 19–25); Match Result P2			Filoil Flying V Arena; Attendance: 541; Referees: J. Villareal & P. Sison

Emilio Aguinaldo College wins the series in two games

== Finals ==
September 20, 2015; 15:00	National University	0–3	Ateneo de Manila University	Filoil Flying V Arena; Attendance: 1,562; Referees: L. Pajarillo, B. Liberato
September 20, 2015; 15:00	(17–25, 18–25, 19–25); Match Result P2			Filoil Flying V Arena; Attendance: 1,562; Referees: L. Pajarillo, B. Liberato

September 27, 2015; 15:00	Ateneo de Manila University	3–1	National University	Filoil Flying V Arena; Attendance: 2,180; Referees: P. Sison & R. Rojas
September 27, 2015; 15:00	(25–23, 25–21, 38–40, 25–19); Match Result P2			Filoil Flying V Arena; Attendance: 2,180; Referees: P. Sison & R. Rojas

Ateneo de Manila University wins the series in two games

== Awards ==
- Most valuable player (Finals)
  - Marck Espejo (Ateneo)
- Most valuable player (Conference)
  - Marck Espejo (Ateneo)
- Best setter
  - April Jhon Pagtalunan (EAC)
- Best Outside Spikers
  - Howard Mojica (EAC)
  - Marck Espejo (Ateneo)
- Best middle blockers
  - Kim Malabunga (NU)
  - Reyson Fuentes (DLSU)
- Best opposite spiker
  - Ysay Marasigan (Ateneo)
- Best libero
  - Ricky Marcos (NU)

== Final standings ==
Rank	Team
1st place, gold medalist(s)	Ateneo de Manila University
2nd place, silver medalist(s)	National University
3rd place, bronze medalist(s)	Emilio Aguinaldo College
4	National College of Business and Arts
5	De La Salle University – Manila
6	University of the Philippines – Diliman
7	College of Saint Benilde
8	Far Eastern University
9	Mapúa Institute of Technology
10	Arellano University
11	De La Salle University - Dasmariñas
12	University of the East

Spikers' Turf 1st Season Collegiate Conference
Ateneo de Manila University Blue Eagles
First Title

Team roster
Lawrence Magadia, Karl Baysa, Ron Medalla, Joshua Villanueva, Anthony Koyfman, Ysrael Marasigan (c), Timothy Sto. Tomas(G), Rex Intal, Dan Posadas(G/L), Manuel Sumanguid (L), Esmilzo Polvorosa, Marck Espejo, Gian Carlo Glorioso, Ishmael Rivera
Oliver Almadro (Head Coach), Jarod Hubalde (Asst. Coach)

Note
(G) - Guest Player
((c)) - Team Captain
(L) - Libero

- Ateneo de Manila University Blue Eagles made history in the Spikers' Turf by being the first team to sweep a conference (13 wins & 0 loss).

== Venue ==
- Filoil Flying V Arena, San Juan

== See also ==
- Shakey's V-League 12th Season Collegiate Conference
