= Marck Espejo =

Filipino volleyball player (born 1997)

- Espejo in 2025

Personal information
- Full name: Marck Jesus Paguirigan Espejo
- Nationality: Filipino
- Born: March 1, 1997 (age 29) Manila, Philippines
- Home town: Marikina
- Education: Ateneo de Manila University
- Height: 1.89 m (6 ft 2 in)
- Weight: 180 lb (82 kg)
- Spike: 340 cm (134 in)
- Block: 335 cm (132 in)

Volleyball information
- Position: Outside hitter
- Current club: TSG Skyhawks
- Number: 3

Career
- Years: Team
- 2015: Cagayan Valley
- 2018–2019, 2022, 2023: Cignal
- 2018–2019: Weisse Adler
- 2019–2020: Visakha
- 2020–2021: Bani Jamra
- 2021–2022: FC Tokyo
- 2023–2024: Incheon Korean Air Jumbos
- 2024: Criss Cross King Crunchers
- 2024–2025: Kubota Spears Osaka
- 2026–: TSG Skyhawks

National team
- Years: Team
- 2015–present: Philippines
Honours
Men's volleyball
Representing Philippines
SEA Games
Silver medal – second place	2019 Philippines	Team
Bronze medal – third place	2025 Thailand	Team
ASEAN University Games
Bronze medal – third place	2016 Singapore	Team

Marck Jesus Paguirigan Espejo (born March 1, 1997) is a Filipino volleyball athlete who plays for TSG Skyhawks of the Taiwan Professional Volleyball League. He is also member of the Philippines men's national volleyball team and played collegiate volleyball with Ateneo de Manila University.

== Early life and education ==
Marck Espejo was born on March 1, 1997, in Manila, Philippines. He took up volleball when he was on his sixth grade in elementary school. Espejo studied at the Santa Elena High School - Marikina. He later attended the Ateneo de Manila University.

== Career ==
=== Youth ===
Espejo was part of Santa Elena High School - Marikina boys' volleyball team. In his freshman year, Espejo mostly fulfilled the role as a ball boy, consuming leftover drinks of his teammates. The following year, the departure of his older teammate enable Espejo to become part of Santa Elena's core team. He also bagged the Best Attacker awards in the 2012 Palarong Pambansa, 2011 National Milo Little Olympics Championship, 2012 and 2013 NCR Volleyball Regional Meet.

=== Collegiate ===
As a multi-awarded high school volleyball player, he was recruited by Ateneo De Manila University to play for its men's varsity volleyball team. Espejo won the 2014 GUIDON-Moro Lorenzo Sportsman of The Year award.

==== UAAP ====
In the University Athletic Association of the Philippines (UAAP) Volleyball Championship, Espejo led Ateneo's team to win three consecutive championships from UAAP Season 77 to UAAP Season 79.

In UAAP Season 76 where Ateneo finished as runner-ups, Espejo was hailed as the Rookie of the Year and Season's MVP while in UAAP Season 77 as Best Attacker and Season's MVP. In UAAP Season 78, he received three awards: Best Attacker, Best Server, and Season's MVP. Espejo also bagged the UAAP Season 79 Best Scorer, Best Attacker, and Season's MVP. He ended his UAAP stint with Ateneo in 2018 with a loss to the National University in the final of UAAP Season 80. And Espejo makes a historic 55-point game on UAAP Season 80 Semifinals against FEU.

==== Spikers' Turf and PVL ====
He also led Ateneo in bagging the championship title in Spikers' Turf 1st Season Collegiate Conference, Spikers' Turf 2nd Season Collegiate Conference, and Premier Volleyball League 1st Season Collegiate Conference in addition to the Premier Volleyball League Collegiate Conference championship.

In the Spikers' Turf 1st Season Collegiate Conference 2nd Best Outside Spiker, Conference and Finals MVP, Spikers' Turf 2nd Season Collegiate Conference 1st Best Outside Spiker and Conference MVP, and 2017 Premier Volleyball League 1st Season Collegiate Conference 1st Best Outside Spiker, Conference and Finals MVP. He was also awarded as the 1st Best Outside Spiker in the Spikers' Turf 1st Season Open Conference.

=== Club career ===
==== Early years: Philippines ====
Espejo helped the Cagayan Valley Rising Suns in snatching the bronze medal in the Cagayan Friendship Games and silver medal in the Spikers' Turf 1st Season Open Conference in 2015.

Following the end of his UAAP stint with Ateneo, Espejo was set to play for Cignal HD Spikers in the men's division of the 2018 Premier Volleyball League Reinforced Conference.

==== Oita Miyoshi Weisse Adler ====
In May 2018, Espejo received an offer to play for a team in Japan. On May 27, it was announced that he has officially signed to play for the Japanese club, Oita Miyoshi Weisse Adler. He was recommended by Godfrey Owese Okumu, the coach of the University of the Philippines' women's team.

==== Visakha ====
In December 2019, Espejo joined Visakha of the Volleyball Thailand League. He debuted for the club in January 2020.

==== Bani Jamra ====
Espejo moved to Bahrain in November 2020 to play for Bani Jamra of the Isa bin Rashid Volleyball League. He moved back to the Philippines after his contract with Bani Jamra ended on January 30, 2021. He helped his team finish sixth in a league of six teams in the 2020–21 season.

==== FC Tokyo ====
Espejo returned to Japan, after he was signed in to play for FC Tokyo for the 2021–21 season of V.League.

==== Incheon Korean Air Jumbos ====
In April 27, Espejo joined to the 2023 KOVO Men's Asian Quota Draft held in Jeju Island, South Korea. Espejo got picked and assigned to play for Incheon Korean Air Jumbos in 2023–24 season of the Korean V-League.

==== Return to the Philippines ====
Espejo would return to the Philippines to play for the Criss Cross King Crunchers in the 2024 Spikers' Turf Open Conference.

==== Kubota Spears Osaka ====
Espejo will return to Japan and signed to play for Kubota Spears Osaka for the 2024–2025 season of the rebranded V.League.

==== TSG Skyhawks ====
On January 21, 2026, TSG Skyhawks of the Taiwan Professional Volleyball League announced they have signed in Espejo.

=== National team ===
Espejo is a long-time member of the Philippine national team and has been playing for them by more than ten years. In 2015, Espejo was chosen member of the Philippine national team for the 2015 SEA Games. He was part of the team which won a silver medal at the 2019 SEA Games and also appeared in the 2022 Asian Games in late 2023. Espejo was part of the Philippine squad which represented the host country at the 2025 FIVB Men's Volleyball World Championship.

== Clubs ==
- (Philippines) Cagayan Valley Rising Suns (2015)
- (Philippines) Cignal HD Spikers (2018–2019, 2022, 2023)
- (Japan) Oita Miyoshi Weisse Adler (2018–2019)
- (Thailand) Visakha (2019–2020)
- (Bahrain) Bani Jamra (2020–2021)
- (Japan) FC Tokyo (2021–2022)
- (South Korea) Incheon Korean Air Jumbos (2023–2024)
- (Philippines) Criss Cross King Crunchers (2024)
- (Japan) Kubota Spears Osaka (2024–2025)
- (Taiwan) TSG Skyhawks (2026–present)

== Awards ==
=== Individuals ===
- 2012 Palarong Pambansa "Best attacker"
- UAAP Season 76 "Rookie of the Year"
- UAAP Season 76 "Season's Most Valuable Player"
- UAAP Season 77 "Best attacker"
- UAAP Season 77 "Season's Most Valuable Player"
- 2015 Spikers' Turf 1st Season Open Conference "1st Best Outside Spiker"
- 2015 Spikers' Turf 1st Season Open Conference "Conference Most Valuable Player"
- 2015 Spikers' Turf 1st Season Collegiate Conference "Conference Most Valuable Player"
- 2015 Spikers' Turf 1st Season Collegiate Conference "Finals Most Valuable Player"
- 2015 Spikers' Turf 1st Season Collegiate Conference "2nd Best Outside Spiker"
- UAAP Season 78 "Best attacker"
- UAAP Season 78 "Best server"
- UAAP Season 78 "Season's Most Valuable Player"
- 2016 Spikers' Turf 2nd Season Collegiate Conference "Conference Most Valuable Player"
- 2016 Spikers' Turf 2nd Season Collegiate Conference "1st Best Outside Spiker"
- UAAP Season 79 "Best attacker"
- UAAP Season 79 "Best scorer"
- UAAP Season 79 "Season's Most Valuable Player"
- 2017 Premier Volleyball League 1st Season Collegiate Conference "Finals Most Valuable Player"
- 2017 Premier Volleyball League 1st Season Collegiate Conference "Conference Most Valuable Player"
- 2017 Premier Volleyball League 1st Season Collegiate Conference "1st Best Outside Spiker"
- UAAP Season 80 "Best scorer"
- UAAP Season 80 "Best attacker"
- UAAP Season 80 "Best server"
- UAAP Season 80 "Season's Most Valuable Player"
- 2018 Premier Volleyball League 2nd Season Reinforced Conference "Conference Most Valuable Player"
- 2018 Premier Volleyball League 2nd Season Reinforced Conference "1st Best Outside Spiker"
- 2019 Thailand Open Sealect Tuna Championships "2nd Best Outside Spiker"
- 2019 Spikers' Turf Reinforced Conference "Finals Most Valuable Player"
- 2019 Spikers' Turf Reinforced Conference "2nd Best Outside Spiker"
- 2019 Spikers' Turf Open Conference "Finals Most Valuable Player"
- 2019 Spikers' Turf Open Conference "2nd Best Outside Spiker"
- 2022 Spikers' Turf Open Conference "1st Best Outside Spiker"
- 2023 Spikers' Turf Open Conference "Finals Most Valuable Player"

=== Special Recognitions ===
- 2014 GUIDON-Moro Lorenzo Sportsman of The Year
- 2018 PSA Annual Awards Mr. Volleyball
- 2019 PSA Annual Awards Mr. Volleyball

=== Club ===
- 2015 Cagayan Friendship Games – Bronze medal, with Cagayan Valley Rising Suns
- 2015 Spikers' Turf 1st Season Open Conference – Silver medal, with Cagayan Valley Rising Suns
- 2018 Premier Volleyball League 2nd Season Reinforced Conference – Silver medal, with Cignal HD Spikers
- 2019 Spikers' Turf 4th Season Reinforced Conference – Champions, with Cignal HD Spikers
- 2019 Spikers' Turf 4th Season Open Conference – Champions, with Cignal HD Spikers
- 2022 Spikers' Turf 5th Season Open Conference – Silver Medal, with Cignal HD Spikers
- 2023 Spikers' Turf 6th Season Open Conference – Champions, with Cignal HD Spikers

=== National ===
- 2019 Thailand Open Sealect Tuna Championships – Bronze medal
- 2019 30th Southeast Asian Games – Silver medal
