= UAAP Season 77 volleyball tournaments =

Volleyball tournaments

UAAP Season 77 Volleyball
- Host school: University of the East
Men's Finals	G1	G2	Wins
Ateneo Blue Eagles	3	3	2
NU Bulldogs	1	1	0
- Duration: March 4–7, 2015
- Arena(s): Mall of Asia Arena, Smart Araneta Coliseum
- Finals MVP: Esmilzo Joner Polvorosa
- Winning coach: Oliver Almadro
- Semifinalists: UST Growling Tigers; Adamson Soaring Falcons
- TV network(s): ABS-CBN, ABS-CBN Sports+Action, The Filipino Channel, Balls, Balls HD
Women's Finals	G1	G2	Wins
Ateneo Lady Eagles	3	3	2+1
De La Salle Lady Archers	0	0	0
- Duration: March 11–14, 2015
- Arena(s): Smart Araneta Coliseum, Mall of Asia Arena
- Finals MVP: Rongomaipapa Amy Ahomiro
- Winning coach: Anusorn Bundit
- Semifinalists: NU Lady Bulldogs; FEU Lady Tamaraws
- TV network(s): ABS-CBN, ABS-CBN Sports+Action, The Filipino Channel, Balls, Balls HD

The UAAP Season 77 seniors' division volleyball tournament started on November 22, 2014, at the Mall of Asia Arena in Pasay, Metro Manila. Opening-day games were the women's teams of UE vs UST at 2 PM and Ateneo vs NU at 4 PM. The tournament main venue was the Filoil Flying V Arena in San Juan City while selected games will be played at the Smart Araneta Coliseum in Cubao, Quezon City, and the Mall of Asia Arena in Pasay.

The UAAP Season 77 high school volleyball tournament started on July 26, 2014. The tournament venue was the Adamson University Gym in San Marcelino St., Ermita, Manila. The number of participating schools in the boys' and girls' tournaments both increased to seven. Far Eastern University fielded boys' and girls' volleyball teams this season. Since there are now seven participating schools, the tournaments will have a Final Four format.

== Men's tournament ==
=== Elimination round ===
==== Team standings ====
Pos	Team	Pld	W	L	Pts	SW	SL	SR	SPW	SPL	SPR	Qualification
1	Ateneo Blue Eagles	14	11	3	34	38	14	2.714	1214	1064	1.141	Semifinals with a twice-to-beat advantage
2	UST Growling Tigers	14	11	3	32	37	15	2.467	1210	1094	1.106	Semifinals with a twice-to-beat advantage
3	NU Bulldogs	14	10	4	29	33	18	1.833	1079	974	1.108	Semifinals
4	Adamson Soaring Falcons	14	10	4	29	32	19	1.684	1103	992	1.112	Semifinals
5	FEU Tamaraws	14	6	8	14	22	34	0.647	1197	1263	0.948	
6	De La Salle Green Archers	14	4	10	15	21	33	0.636	1134	1216	0.933	
7	UP Fighting Maroons	14	4	10	12	20	37	0.541	1169	1252	0.934	
8	UE Red Warriors (H)	14	0	14	3	9	42	0.214	970	1213	0.800	

Rules for classification: Point system: 3 points = win match in 3 or 4 sets; 2 points = win match in 5 sets; 1 point = lose match in 5 sets; 0 point = lose match in 3 or 4 sets
(H) Host

==== Match-up results ====
	Round 1							Round 2						
Team ╲ Game	1	2	3	4	5	6	7	8	9	10	11	12	13	14
ADU	NU school colors	Ateneo school colors	UP school colors	UE school colors	La Salle school colors	UST school colors	FEU school colors	La Salle school colors	Ateneo school colors	UST school colors	FEU school colors	UE school colors	UP school colors	NU school colors
ADMU	FEU school colors	Adamson school colors	UST school colors	UP school colors	La Salle school colors	UE school colors	NU school colors	Adamson school colors	UE school colors	NU school colors	UP school colors	FEU school colors	La Salle school colors	UST school colors
DLSU	UP school colors	NU school colors	UE school colors	FEU school colors	Ateneo school colors	Adamson school colors	UST school colors	Adamson school colors	UE school colors	FEU school colors	NU school colors	UST school colors	Ateneo school colors	UP school colors
FEU	Ateneo school colors	NU school colors	UE school colors	La Salle school colors	UST school colors	UP school colors	Adamson school colors	UP school colors	UST school colors	La Salle school colors	Adamson school colors	NU school colors	Ateneo school colors	UE school colors
NU	Adamson school colors	FEU school colors	La Salle school colors	UST school colors	UE school colors	UP school colors	Ateneo school colors	UP school colors	UST school colors	Ateneo school colors	La Salle school colors	FEU school colors	UE school colors	Adamson school colors
UE	UST school colors	FEU school colors	La Salle school colors	Adamson school colors	NU school colors	Ateneo school colors	UP school colors	La Salle school colors	Ateneo school colors	UP school colors	UST school colors	Adamson school colors	NU school colors	FEU school colors
UP	La Salle school colors	Adamson school colors	UST school colors	Ateneo school colors	NU school colors	FEU school colors	UE school colors	NU school colors	FEU school colors	UE school colors	Ateneo school colors	Adamson school colors	UST school colors	La Salle school colors
UST	UE school colors	Ateneo school colors	UP school colors	NU school colors	FEU school colors	Adamson school colors	La Salle school colors	NU school colors	FEU school colors	Adamson school colors	UE school colors	La Salle school colors	UP school colors	Ateneo school colors

= Win; = Loss

==== Game results ====
Results to the right and top of the gray cells are first round games, those to the left and below are second round games.

Team	AdU	ADMU	DLSU	FEU	NU	UE	UP	UST
Adamson		3–1	3–2	3–0	0–3	3–0	3–1	3–1
Ateneo	3–0		3–0	3–0	3–2	3–1	3–2	0–3
La Salle	0–3	0–3		2–3	0–3	3–0	2–3	0–3
FEU	3–1	1–3	3–2		1–3	3–2	1–3	1–3
NU	3–1	1–3	0–3	3–0		3–0	3–0	3–2
UE	0–3	0–3	1–3	1–3	0–3		2–3	0–3
UP	1–3	0–3	2–3	2–3	2–3	3–2		0–3
UST	1–3	3–2	3–1	3–0	3–0	3–0	3–0	

Legend: Blue = left column team win; Red = top row team win.

=== Bracket ===
Semifinals (Nos. 1 & 2 have twice-to-beat advantage)
1	Ateneo	3
4	Adamson	1
2	UST	1	0
3	NU	3	3

Finals (Best-of-three series)
1	Ateneo	3	3
3	NU	1	1

=== Semifinals ===
==== Ateneo vs Adamson ====
February 25; 02:00 PM (UTC+08:00)	Ateneo Blue Eagles	3–1	Adamson Soaring Falcons	Mall of Asia Arena, Pasay
February 25; 02:00 PM (UTC+08:00)	(25–16, 25–12, 26–28, 25–20)			Mall of Asia Arena, Pasay

==== UST vs NU ====
February 25; 10:00 AM (UTC+08:00)	UST Growling Tigers	1–3	NU Bulldogs	Mall of Asia Arena, Pasay
February 25; 10:00 AM (UTC+08:00)	(24–26, 26–28, 25–23, 21–25)			Mall of Asia Arena, Pasay

February 28; 02:00 PM (UTC+08:00)	UST Growling Tigers	0–3	NU Bulldogs	Smart Araneta Coliseum, Quezon City
February 28; 02:00 PM (UTC+08:00)	(18–25, 23–25, 23–25)			Smart Araneta Coliseum, Quezon City

=== Finals ===
March 4; 02:00 PM (UTC+08:00)	Ateneo Blue Eagles	3–1	NU Bulldogs	Smart Araneta Coliseum, Quezon City
March 4; 02:00 PM (UTC+08:00)	(25–19, 30–28, 20–25, 25–22)			Smart Araneta Coliseum, Quezon City

March 7; 02:00 PM (UTC+08:00)	Ateneo Blue Eagles	3–1	NU Bulldogs	Mall of Asia Arena, Pasay
March 7; 02:00 PM (UTC+08:00)	(23–25, 25–23, 25–23, 25–15)			Mall of Asia Arena, Pasay

=== Awards ===
UAAP Season 77 men's volleyball champions
Ateneo Blue Eagles
First title

- Most valuable player (Season): Marck Jesus Espejo (Ateneo de Manila University)
- Most valuable player (Finals): Esmilzo Joner Polvorosa (Ateneo de Manila University)
- Rookie of the Year: Edward Camposano (University of the East)
- Best scorer: Mark Gil Alfafara (University of Santo Tomas)
- Best attacker: Marck Jesus Espejo (Ateneo de Manila University)
- Best blocker: Peter Den Mar Torres (National University)
- Best setter: Esmilzo Joner Polvorosa (Ateneo de Manila University)
- Best digger: Rence Melgar (Adamson University)
- Best receiver: Rence Melgar (Adamson University)
- Best server: Vincent Mangulabnan (National University)

== Women's tournament ==
=== Elimination round ===
==== Team standings ====
Pos	Team	Pld	W	L	Pts	SW	SL	SR	SPW	SPL	SPR	Qualification
1	Ateneo Lady Eagles	14	14	0	39	42	7	6.000	1161	926	1.254	Finals
2	De La Salle Lady Archers	14	12	2	37	39	11	3.545	1212	948	1.278	Semifinals with a twice-to-beat advantage
3	NU Lady Bulldogs	14	8	6	22	25	24	1.042	1083	1045	1.036	First round
4	FEU Lady Tamaraws	14	6	8	18	21	26	0.808	1036	1047	0.989	First round
5	UST Growling Tigresses	14	6	8	20	24	26	0.923	1095	1056	1.037	Fourth-seed playoff
6	UP Lady Maroons	14	5	9	17	23	31	0.742	1114	1203	0.926	
7	Adamson Lady Falcons	14	5	9	15	22	30	0.733	1094	1162	0.941	
8	UE Lady Warriors (H)	14	0	14	0	1	42	0.024	665	1073	0.620	

Rules for classification: Point system: 3 point = win match in 3 or 4 sets; 2 points = win match in 5 sets; 1 point = lose match in 5 sets; 0 point = lose match in 3 or 4 sets
(H) Host

==== Match-up results ====
	Round 1							Round 2						
Team ╲ Game	1	2	3	4	5	6	7	8	9	10	11	12	13	14
AdU	La Salle school colors	Ateneo school colors	UE school colors	FEU school colors	UST school colors	UP school colors	NU school colors	UST school colors	Ateneo school colors	UE school colors	UP school colors	La Salle school colors	NU school colors	FEU school colors
ADMU	NU school colors	Adamson school colors	FEU school colors	UST school colors	UP school colors	UE school colors	La Salle school colors	NU school colors	Adamson school colors	UP school colors	FEU school colors	UST school colors	UE school colors	La Salle school colors
DLSU	Adamson school colors	NU school colors	UST school colors	UP school colors	FEU school colors	UE school colors	Ateneo school colors	FEU school colors	UP school colors	NU school colors	UST school colors	UE school colors	Adamson school colors	Ateneo school colors
FEU	UP school colors	Ateneo school colors	UE school colors	Adamson school colors	La Salle school colors	NU school colors	UST school colors	La Salle school colors	UE school colors	UST school colors	Ateneo school colors	NU school colors	UP school colors	Adamson school colors
NU	Ateneo school colors	La Salle school colors	UP school colors	UE school colors	FEU school colors	UST school colors	Adamson school colors	Ateneo school colors	UST school colors	La Salle school colors	UE school colors	FEU school colors	Adamson school colors	UP school colors
UE	UST school colors	Adamson school colors	FEU school colors	NU school colors	UP school colors	La Salle school colors	Ateneo school colors	UP school colors	FEU school colors	Adamson school colors	NU school colors	La Salle school colors	Ateneo school colors	UST school colors
UP	FEU school colors	NU school colors	UST school colors	La Salle school colors	UE school colors	Ateneo school colors	Adamson school colors	UE school colors	La Salle school colors	Ateneo school colors	Adamson school colors	UST school colors	FEU school colors	NU school colors
UST	UE school colors	La Salle school colors	UP school colors	Ateneo school colors	Adamson school colors	NU school colors	FEU school colors	Adamson school colors	NU school colors	FEU school colors	La Salle school colors	Ateneo school colors	UP school colors	UE school colors

= Win; = Loss

==== Game results ====
Results to the right and top of the gray cells are first round games, those to the left and below are second round games.

Team	AdU	ADMU	DLSU	FEU	NU	UE	UP	UST
Adamson		0–3	1–3	3–0	1–3	3–0	1–3	3–1
Ateneo	3–2		3–2	3–0	3–0	3–0	3–2	3–0
La Salle	3–0	1–3		3–1	3–0	3–0	3–0	3–0
FEU	3–0	0–3	1–3		3–0	3–0	3–0	1–3
NU	3–1	0–3	1–3	3–0		3–0	3–2	3–2
UE	0–3	0–3	0–3	1–3	0–3		0–3	0–3
UP	2–3	0–3	1–3	1–3	0–3	3–0		3–1
UST	3–1	0–3	0–3	3–0	3–0	3–0	2–3	

Legend: Blue = left column team win; Red = top row team win.

=== Bracket ===
4th–seed playoff (One–game playoff)
4	UST	2
5	FEU	3

First round (One–game playoff)
3	NU	3
4	FEU	1

Semifinals (No. 2 seed has twice-to-beat advantage)
2	La Salle	0	3
3	NU	3	1

Finals (No. 1 seed has to win twice; opponent thrice)
1	Ateneo	3	3
2	La Salle	0	0

=== Fourth–seed playoff ===
February 25; 04:00 PM (UTC+08:00)	UST Growling Tigresses	2–3	FEU Lady Tamaraws	Mall of Asia Arena, Pasay
February 25; 04:00 PM (UTC+08:00)	(21–25, 15–25, 25–20, 25–16, 6–15)			Mall of Asia Arena, Pasay

=== First round ===
February 28; 04:00 PM (UTC+08:00)	NU Lady Bulldogs	3–1	FEU Lady Tamaraws	Smart Araneta Coliseum, Quezon City
February 28; 04:00 PM (UTC+08:00)	(25–13, 25–17, 25–27, 25–23)			Smart Araneta Coliseum, Quezon City

=== Semifinals ===
La Salle has the twice-to-beat advantage.

March 4; 04:00 PM (UTC+08:00)	De La Salle Lady Archers	0–3	NU Lady Bulldogs	Smart Araneta Coliseum, Quezon City
March 4; 04:00 PM (UTC+08:00)	(20–25, 20–25, 19–25)			Smart Araneta Coliseum, Quezon City

March 7; 04:00 PM (UTC+08:00)	De La Salle Lady Archers	3–1	NU Lady Bulldogs	Mall of Asia Arena, Pasay
March 7; 04:00 PM (UTC+08:00)	(26–24, 21–25, 25–18, 25–21)			Mall of Asia Arena, Pasay

=== Finals ===
Elimination round games:

- January 11: Ateneo (3-2) La Salle at the Mall of Asia Arena (25-22, 25–27, 16–25, 25–14, 15–9)
- February 18: Ateneo (3-1) La Salle at the Mall of Asia Arena (25-20, 21–25, 25–23, 27–25)

Ateneo has the thrice-to-beat advantage after sweeping the elimination round.

March 11; 03:00 PM (UTC+08:00)	Ateneo Lady Eagles	3–0	De La Salle Lady Archers	Smart Araneta Coliseum, Quezon City; Attendance: 18,363
March 11; 03:00 PM (UTC+08:00)	(25–18, 25–19, 25–19)			Smart Araneta Coliseum, Quezon City; Attendance: 18,363

March 14; 03:00 PM (UTC+08:00)	Ateneo Lady Eagles	3–0	De La Salle Lady Archers	Mall of Asia Arena, Pasay; Attendance: 20,705
March 14; 03:00 PM (UTC+08:00)	(25–22, 25–17, 25–23)			Mall of Asia Arena, Pasay; Attendance: 20,705

=== Awards ===
UAAP Season 77 women's volleyball champions
Ateneo Lady Eagles
Second title, second consecutive title

- Most valuable player (Season): Alyssa Valdez (Ateneo de Manila University)
- Most valuable player (Finals): Rongomaipapa Amy Ahomiro (Ateneo de Manila University)
- Rookie of the Year: Kath Arado (University of the East) and Ennajie Laure (University of Santo Tomas)
- Best scorer: Alyssa Valdez (Ateneo de Manila University)
- Best attacker: Alyja Daphne Santiago (National University)
- Best blocker: Marivic Velaine Meneses (University of Santo Tomas)
- Best server: Alyssa Valdez (Ateneo de Manila University)
- Best setter: Julia Melissa Morado (Ateneo de Manila University)
- Best receiver: Dennise Michelle Lazaro (Ateneo de Manila University)
- Best digger: Christine Agno (Far Eastern University)

== Boys' tournament ==
=== Elimination round ===
==== Team standings ====
Pos	Team	Pld	W	L	PCT	GB	Qualification
1	UE Junior Red Warriors (H)	12	12	0	1.000	—	Advance to the Finals
2	NUNS Bullpups	12	9	3	.750	3	Twice-to-beat in stepladder round 2
3	Ateneo Blue Eaglets	12	8	4	.667	4	Stepladder round 1
4	UST Tiger Cubs	12	7	5	.583	5	Stepladder round 1
5	Zobel Junior Archers	12	3	9	.250	9	
6	FEU–D Baby Tamaraws	12	2	10	.167	10	
7	UPIS Junior Fighting Maroons	12	1	11	.083	11	

Rules for classification: 1) winning percentage; 2) if tied for #2 or #4, one-game playoff; 3) head-to-head record; 4) head-to-head point differential; 5) overall point differential
(H) Hosts

==== Match-up results ====
	Round 1						Round 2					
Team ╲ Game	1	2	3	4	5	6	7	8	9	10	11	12
AdMU	UP school colors	UE school colors	La Salle school colors	FEU school colors	NU school colors	UST school colors	La Salle school colors	UE school colors	FEU school colors	UP school colors	NU school colors	UST school colors
DLSZ	UST school colors	UP school colors	UE school colors	Ateneo school colors	FEU school colors	NU school colors	Ateneo school colors	FEU school colors	UP school colors	NU school colors	UST school colors	UE school colors
FEU–F	NU school colors	UST school colors	UP school colors	UE school colors	Ateneo school colors	La Salle school colors	UST school colors	La Salle school colors	UE school colors	Ateneo school colors	UP school colors	NU school colors
NU	FEU school colors	UST school colors	UP school colors	UE school colors	Ateneo school colors	La Salle school colors	UP school colors	UST school colors	La Salle school colors	UE school colors	Ateneo school colors	FEU school colors
UE	Ateneo school colors	La Salle school colors	FEU school colors	NU school colors	UST school colors	UP school colors	Ateneo school colors	FEU school colors	UP school colors	NU school colors	UST school colors	La Salle school colors
UPIS	Ateneo school colors	La Salle school colors	FEU school colors	NU school colors	UST school colors	UE school colors	NU school colors	UST school colors	La Salle school colors	UE school colors	Ateneo school colors	FEU school colors
UST	La Salle school colors	FEU school colors	NU school colors	UP school colors	UE school colors	Ateneo school colors	FEU school colors	UP school colors	NU school colors	La Salle school colors	UE school colors	Ateneo school colors

= Win; = Loss

=== Bracket ===
Stepladder round 1 (One-game playoff)
3	Ateneo	3
4	UST	0

Stepladder round 2 (No. 2 has twice-to-beat advantage)
2	NU	1	0
3	Ateneo	3	3

Finals (No. 1 seed has to win twice; opponent thrice)
1	UE	3	3
3	Ateneo	2	2

=== Awards ===
UAAP Season 77 boys' volleyball champions
UE Junior Red Warriors
14th title, 11th consecutive title

- Most valuable player: Ron Adrian Medalla (University of the East)
- Rookie of the Year: Raymart Reyes (National University)
- Best attacker: Joshua Umandal (University of the East)
- Best blocker: Gian Carlo Glorioso (Ateneo de Manila University)
- Best server: Sebastian Enrique Cuerva (Ateneo de Manila University)
- Best setter: Adrian Rafael Imperial (University of the East)
- Best receiver: Dazyl June Cayamso (National University)
- Best libero: Ralph Ryan Imperial (University of the East)

== Girls' tournament ==
=== Elimination round ===
==== Team standings ====
Pos	Team	Pld	W	L	PCT	GB	Qualification
1	NUNS Lady Bullpups	12	11	1	.917	—	Twice-to-beat in the semifinals
2	UST Junior Tigresses	12	10	2	.833	1	Twice-to-beat in the semifinals
3	Zobel Junior Lady Archers	12	9	3	.750	2	Twice-to-win in the semifinals
4	Adamson Lady Baby Falcons	12	5	7	.417 (Note: Fourth-seed playoff: Adamson 3–2 UE)	6	Twice-to-win in the semifinals
5	UE Junior Lady Warriors (H)	12	5	7	.417	6	Fourth-seed playoff
6	FEU–D Lady Baby Tamaraws	12	2	10	.167	9	
7	UPIS Junior Lady Maroons	12	0	12	.000	11	

Rules for classification: 1) winning percentage; 2) if tied for #2 or #4, one-game playoff; 3) head-to-head record; 4) head-to-head point differential; 5) overall point differential
(H) Hosts

==== Match-up results ====
	Round 1						Round 2					
Team ╲ Game	1	2	3	4	5	6	7	8	9	10	11	12
AdU	UE school colors	UP school colors	UST school colors	La Salle school colors	FEU school colors	NU school colors	UE school colors	UP school colors	UST school colors	FEU school colors	NU school colors	La Salle school colors
DLSZ	UP school colors	UST school colors	Adamson school colors	FEU school colors	NU school colors	UE school colors	FEU school colors	NU school colors	UE school colors	UP school colors	UST school colors	Adamson school colors
FEU–F	NU school colors	UE school colors	UP school colors	UST school colors	La Salle school colors	Adamson school colors	La Salle school colors	UE school colors	UP school colors	UST school colors	Adamson school colors	NU school colors
NU	FEU school colors	UE school colors	UP school colors	UST school colors	La Salle school colors	Adamson school colors	La Salle school colors	UE school colors	UP school colors	UST school colors	Adamson school colors	FEU school colors
UE	Adamson school colors	FEU school colors	NU school colors	UP school colors	UST school colors	La Salle school colors	Adamson school colors	FEU school colors	NU school colors	La Salle school colors	UP school colors	UST school colors
UPIS	La Salle school colors	Adamson school colors	FEU school colors	NU school colors	UE school colors	UST school colors	UST school colors	Adamson school colors	FEU school colors	NU school colors	La Salle school colors	UE school colors
UST	La Salle school colors	Adamson school colors	FEU school colors	NU school colors	UE school colors	UP school colors	UP school colors	Adamson school colors	FEU school colors	NU school colors	La Salle school colors	UE school colors

= Win; = Loss

=== Bracket ===
Fourth-seed playoff
Adamson	3
UE	2

Semifinals; Top seeds twice-to-beat
1	NU	3
4	Adamson	1
2	UST	3
3	La Salle	1

Finals; Best-of-three series
1	NU	3	3
2	UST	1	1

=== Awards ===
UAAP Season 77 girls' volleyball champions
NUNS Lady Bullpups
First title

- Most valuable player:Faith Janine Shirley Nisperos (National University)
- Rookie of the Year: Rachelle Anne Fabro (Far Eastern University)
- Best attacker: Ejiya Laure (University of Santo Tomas)
- Best blocker: Pauline Marie Monique Gaston (University of Santo Tomas)
- Best server: Jennifer Nierva (National University)
- Best setter: Rica Diolan (National University)
- Best receiver: Mildred Dizon (De La Salle University)
- Best digger: Kristine Magallanes (National University)

== Overall championship points ==
=== Seniors' division ===
Team	Men	Women	Total
Ateneo Blue Eagles	15	15	30
NU Bulldogs	12	10	22
De La Salle Green Archers	4	12	16
UST Growling Tigers	10	6	16
FEU Tamaraws	6	8	14
Adamson Soaring Falcons	8	2	10
UP Fighting Maroons	2	4	6
UE Red Warriors	1	1	2

=== Juniors' division ===
Team	Boys'	Girls'	Points
NUNS Bullpups	10	15	25
UE Junior Red Warriors	15	6	21
UST Tiger Cubs	8	12	20
Zobel Junior Archers	6	10	16
Ateneo Blue Eaglets	12	—	12
Adamson Baby Falcons	—	8	8
FEU–D Baby Tamaraws	4	4	8
UPIS Junior Fighting Maroons	2	2	4

Pts.	Ranking
15	Champion
12	2nd
10	3rd
8	4th
6	5th
4	6th
2	7th
1	8th
—	Did not join
WD	Withdrew

In case of a tie, the team with the higher position in any tournament is ranked higher. If both are still tied, they are listed by alphabetical order.

How rankings are determined:

- Ranks 5th to 8th determined by elimination round standings.
- Loser of the #1 vs #4 semifinal match-up is ranked 4th
- Loser of the #2 vs #3 semifinal match-up is ranked 3rd
- Loser of the finals is ranked 2nd
- Champion is ranked 1st

== See also ==
- UAAP Season 77

Preceded by Season 76 (2013–14)	UAAP volleyball tournaments Season 77 (2014–15)	Succeeded by Season 78 (2015–16)
