= National College of Business and Arts =

Private college in Quezon City and Rizal, Philippines

- Pambansang Kolehiyo ng Pangangalakal at Sining (Filipino)
- Other name: NAKBA
- Motto: Populus Contraho of Res quod Arts
- Motto in English: Educating Globally Competitive Filipinos
- Type: Private/non-sectarian
- Established: 1967–1968
- President: Concepcion Nancy T. Pasion
- Principal: Veronica F. Caro MaEd (Cubao), Matilde V. Tobias MaEd. (Taytay, Rizal)
- Students: Over 7,500 (2014)
- Undergraduates: 6,000
- Postgraduates: 1,500
- Location: Quezon City & Taytay, Philippines; 14°37′42.13″N 121°4′4.13″E
- Colors: Green and White
- Nickname: Wildcats
Sporting affiliations
AAPS PISCUAA	QCAA UCLAA
- Mascot: Wildcat
- Website: ncba.edu.ph
- Location in Metro Manila Location in Luzon Location in Philippines

The National College of Business and Arts or NCBA is a private educational institution in the Philippines with campuses located in Cubao, Fairview and Taytay.

NCBA Collegiate Department offers degree programs in the Arts, Sciences, Business and Education as well as Diploma programs. NCBA also offers Graduate degrees in Master in Business Administration and Master in Public Administration.

== History ==
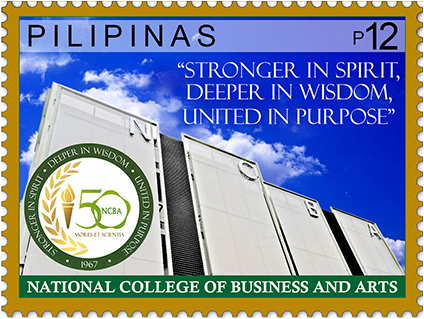
2017 stamp of the Philippines dedicated to the 50th anniversary of NCBA

Established in 1967–68, at the corner of R. Papa and Lepanto streets in Sampaloc, Manila between two giants in Philippine private education: University of the East with its large student population of 65,000 and Far Eastern University with its enrollment of 50,000. A small building was erected to house a small school — the National College of Business and Arts. Today the NCBA has three campuses, two in Quezon City and one in Rizal.

NCBA was founded by the late Dr. Doroteo S. Pasion, a former dean of commerce of San Beda College. Pasion launched NCBA with Col.Rafael Q. Yap-Diangco, Atty. Jose R. Torres, Jr., Mrs. Gloria C. Meñez, and Mrs. Lourdes L. Sarabia

When NCBA opened in 1968, its offerings were limited to the following courses: Bachelor of Science in Business Administration, Bachelor of Arts, two-year course in Secretarial Administration, and its own CPA review. The NCBA High School was opened in school year 1973–1974 followed by additional offerings of short terminal courses in Cooperative, Salesmanship, Bookkeeping and Accounting, and Small business Management in 1974–1975.

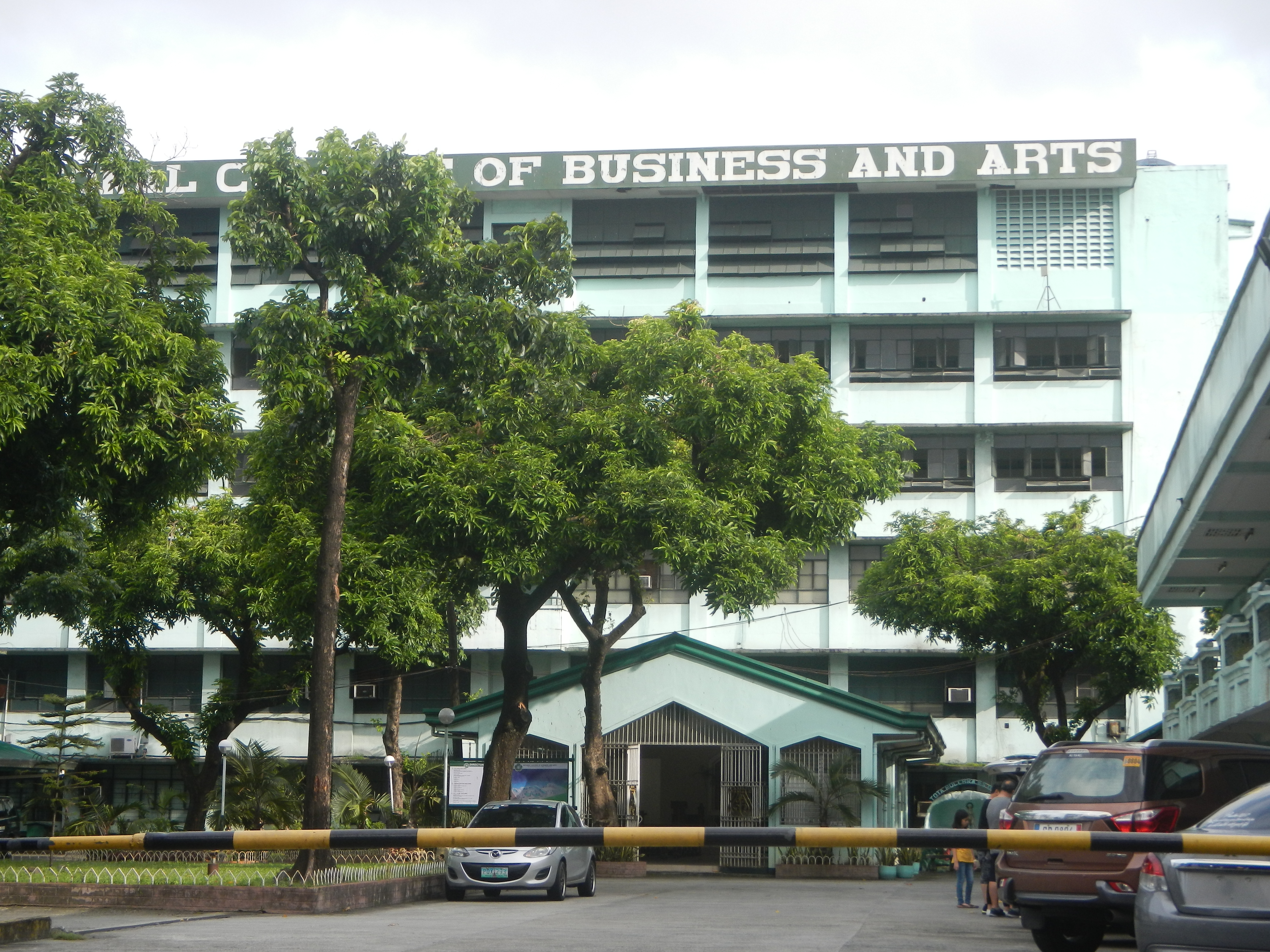
San Roque and Mangga

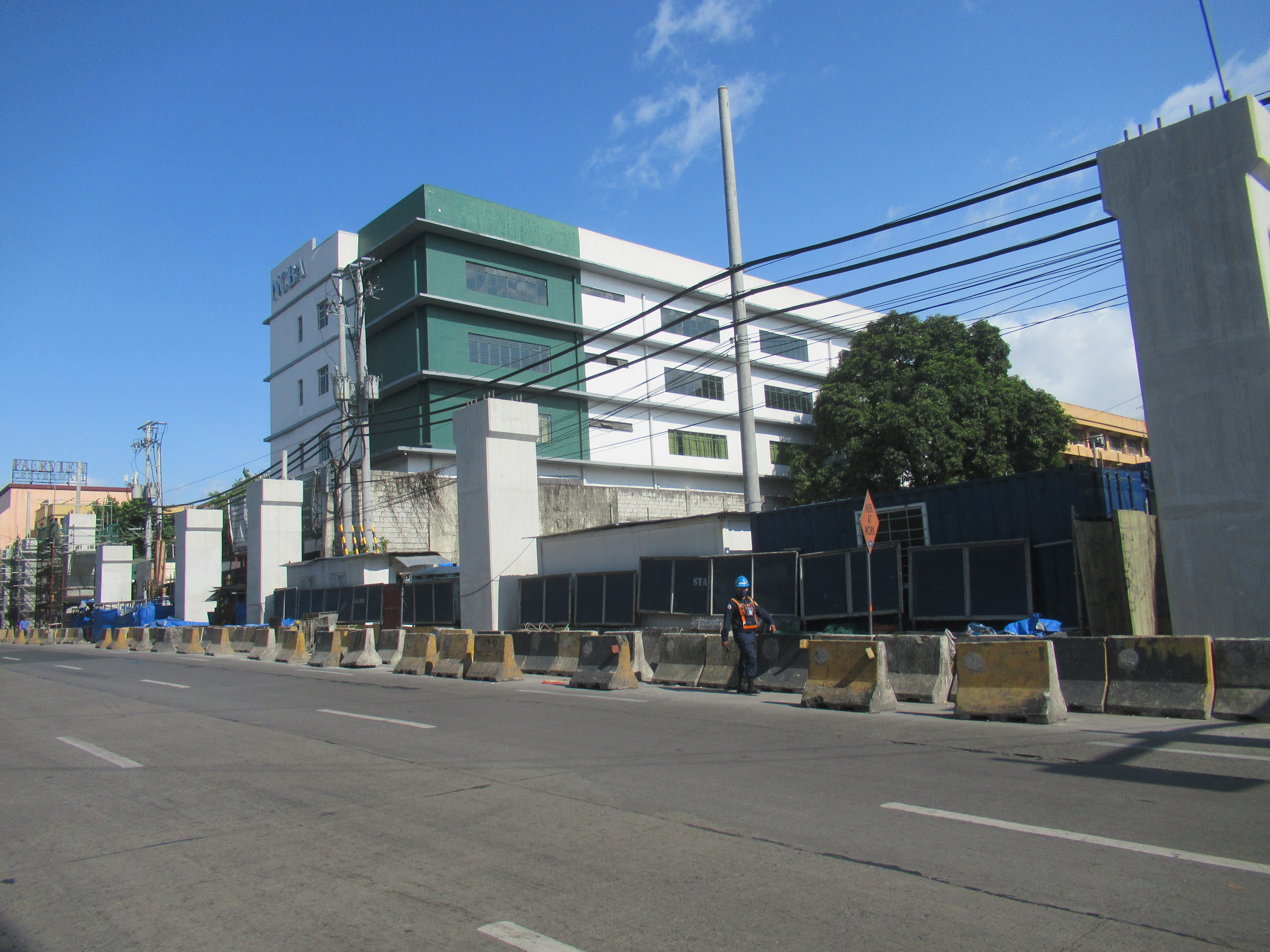
Fairview, Novaliches

== 2010s ==
Effective January 2010, assistant vice president for finance and director, Mr. Cesar C. Meñez, became the school president, while Mr. Edwin P. Torres, and officer-in-charge at NCBA Taytay, became the vice-president for finance.

NCBA Taytay employed Ester Pasion-David as the new officer-in-charge. Pasion-David is the eldest daughter of the founder and first president of the NCBA.

In 2016, Atty. Concepcion Nancy T. Pasion, became the next president of this educational institution. Cesar C. Meñez also died on the same year.

== Golden anniversary ==
In February 2017, NCBA celebrated their 50th founding anniversary, with a new slogan, Vision and Mission.

== Athletics ==
The Wildcats are the varsity athletes who compete in the sport of basketball, volleyball, badminton, taekwondo, cheerleading, track and field, chess, billiards and swimming. These are student-athletes who represent the school in the following athletic leagues: UCLAA, AAPS, QCAA & PISCUAA. National College of Business and Arts is one of the founders of Universities and Colleges of Luzon Athletic Association UCLAA.

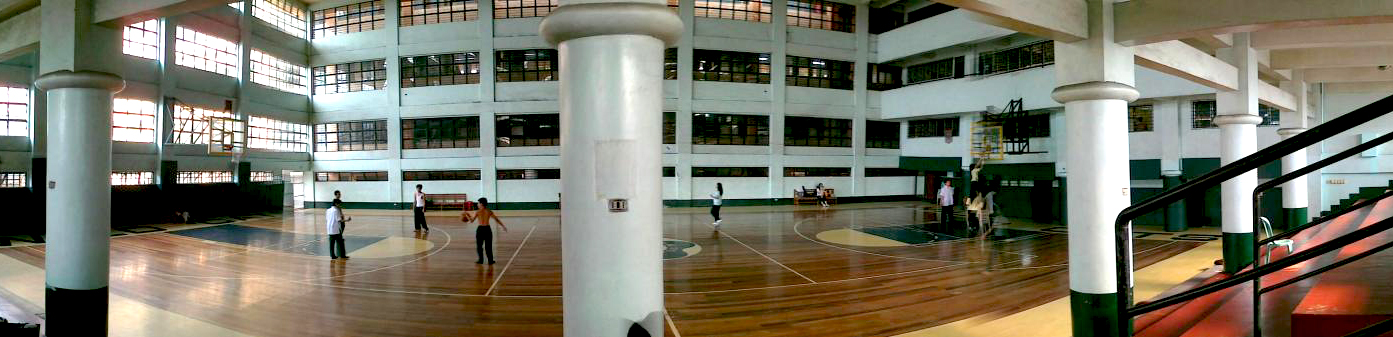
NCBA Fairview Gymnasium

== Alumni ==
- Coco Martin – Actor ABS-CBN & Star Magic, Born: Rodel Luis Pacheco Nacianceno
