= Amy Ahomiro =

New Zealand volleyball player

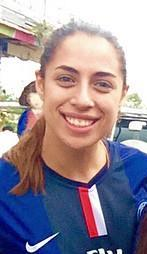
- Ahomiro in 2014

Personal information
- Full name: Rongomaipapa Amy Ahomiro
- Nickname: Kiwi
- Nationality: New Zealander
- Born: 1 May 1992 (age 34)
- Hometown: Tauranga, New Zealand
- Height: 5 ft 10 in (1.78 m)
- Weight: 75 kg (165 lb)
- Education: Ateneo de Manila University

Volleyball information
- Position: Middle Hitter
- Current club: Sta. Lucia Lady Realtors
- Number: 11

Career
Years	Teams
2016	BaliPure
2017–2018	BanKo Perlas
2019	United Volleyball Club
2020	Sta. Lucia Lady Realtors

Rongomaipapa Amy Ahomiro (born 1 May 1992) is a professional volleyball player from New Zealand.

== Personal life ==
Ahomiro was born in Tauranga, New Zealand on 1 May 1992, she was a high school graduate of Brent International School in Manila, Philippines where she moved with her family when she was 14, and graduated from the Ateneo de Manila University in 2015 after finishing an AB Communication course.

== Career ==
She played the sport of volleyball in the Philippines, as a member of the Ateneo de Manila University women's varsity volleyball team, the Ateneo Lady Eagles. Her stint with the Ateneo Lady Eagles was very fruitful. She won the Finals Most Valuable Player award and her team the Ateneo Lady Eagles won the title of the UAAP Season 77 (2014–15) women's volleyball tournament. She joined the club BaliPure Purest Water Defenders for the 2016 Shakey's V-League 13th Season Open Conference wherein they finish in 3rd place beating the team of Laoag Power Smashers for the bronze medal. After her stint with the Balipure Purest Water Defenders, she then joined the club team of Perlas Spikers for the 14th Season of Premier Volleyball League wherein they were about to play for the semi-finals but the rules was change and the 4 bottom teams will have a play-offs for the 3rd and 4th spot but they failed to make it to the cut.

== Awards ==
=== Individuals ===
- 2014–15 UAAP Season 77 "Finals Most Valuable Player"
