= UAAP volleyball championships =

Volleyball championship

UAAP Volleyball
- Sport: Volleyball
- Founded: 1938
- No. of teams: 32 teams: 8 - Men's; 8 - Women's; 8 - Boys'; 8 - Girls'
- Most recent champions: Season 88 (2025–26) Men's – NU Bulldogs; Women's – De La Salle Lady Spikers; Boys' – UE Junior Warriors Girls' – NUNS Lady Bullpups

The University Athletic Association of the Philippines (UAAP) volleyball championships consists of four tournaments, men's and women's in the collegiate division, and boys' and girls' in the high school division. Volleyball is a mandatory sport in the women's division. The UAAP volleyball tournament was held in the first semester of the school year until the UAAP Board decided to move it to the second semester in Season 69 (school year 2006–2007). Since the scheduling shift and given its major overall points contribution to the annual UAAP general championship tallies, the championship in volleyball has emerged as one of the most coveted titles that schools aspire for during every season in the league and is one of the most anticipated live TV sporting events in the Philippines.

== Tournament format ==
The tournament begins with a double round robin group stage, where a team meets its opponent twice in a season. A semi-finals round composed of the top four teams follows, after which the top two teams meet in the final in a best-of-three series.

In the semi-finals, the top four teams based on team standings (and tie-breakers, if applicable) from the group stage battle for a Final Four slot. The two top seeds have a twice-to-beat advantage, that is they must be beaten twice in order to be eliminated. The lower seeds, on the other hand, are eliminated when they are defeated once. The surviving teams face off in the finals in a best-of-three series, where the team which notches two wins takes the championship.

If a team wins all of the games in the group stage, the stepladder format is use, where the unbeaten team has a bye to the finals. The third and fourth seeds battle in a single elimination game; the winner of that game will face the second seed which have a twice-to-beat advantage. The surviving team meets the first seed team in the finals. From 2012 to 2015, the first seed team holds a thrice-to-beat advantage (or an automatic 1–0 lead in the finals in a best-of-five series) for sweeping the group stage. From 2016 to 2022, the finals was changed to a best-of-three series, while the rest remains the same. Since 2023, however, the stepladder semi-finals format have removed the twice-to-beat incentives for the second-seeded team, while the unbeaten team still advances to the finals in a best-of-three series.

== List of volleyball champions ==
Key
Indicator	Meaning
	School won the championship in three divisions in the same year
	School won the men's and women's championships
	School won the men's and juniors' championships
	School won the women's and juniors' championships
(#)	Number of titles won at the time

=== Early years ===
The UAAP founded by FEU, NU, UP and UST in 1938.

Season	Year	Men's	Women's
1	1938–39	No tournament	University of the Philippines Diliman (1)
2	1939–40	No tournament	
3	1940–41	No tournament	
4	1941–42	Not held due to World War II	
5	1942–43	Not held due to World War II	
6	1943–44	Not held due to World War II	
7	1944–45	Not held due to World War II	
8	1945–46	Not held due to World War II	
9	1946–47	Far Eastern University (1)	No tournament
10	1947–48	Far Eastern University (2)	University of the Philippines Diliman (2)
11	1948–49	Far Eastern University (3)	Far Eastern University (1)
12	1949–50	Far Eastern University (4)	University of the Philippines Diliman (3)
13	1950–51	Far Eastern University (5)	Far Eastern University (2)
14	1951–52	Far Eastern University (6)	Far Eastern University (3); University of the Philippines Diliman (4)

=== First expansion ===
Adamson, MCU, UM and UE added; only Adamson and UE were retained.

Season	Year	Men's	Women's
15	1952–53	Far Eastern University (7)	Far Eastern University (4)
16	1953–54	Far Eastern University (8)	National University (1)
17	1954–55	Far Eastern University (9)	Far Eastern University (5)
18	1955–56	Far Eastern University (10)	Far Eastern University (6)
19	1956–57	Far Eastern University (11)	National University (2)
20	1957–58	Far Eastern University (12)	Manila Central University (1)
21	1958–59	University of Santo Tomas (1)	Far Eastern University (7)
22	1959–60	University of Santo Tomas (2)	Far Eastern University (8)
23	1960–61	University of the East (1)	Far Eastern University (9)
24	1961–62	University of the East (2)	Manila Central University (2)
25	1962–63	University of the East (3)	Far Eastern University (10); University of the Philippines Diliman (5)
26	1963–64	University of Santo Tomas (3)	Far Eastern University (11); University of the East (1)
27	1964–65	University of the East (4)	Far Eastern University (12); University of the East (2)
28	1965–66	University of the East (5)	University of the East (3)
29	1966–67	No tournament	
30	1967–68	University of Santo Tomas (4)	Far Eastern University (13)
31	1968–69	University of the East (6)	University of the East (4)
32	1969–70	University of the East (7)	University of the East (5)
33	1970–71	University of the East (8)	Far Eastern University (14)
34	1971–72	No tournament	Far Eastern University (15)
35	1972–73	University of the East (9)	Far Eastern University (16); University of the East (6)
36	1973–74	University of Santo Tomas (5)	Far Eastern University (17)
37	1974–75	University of the East (10)	University of Santo Tomas (1)
38	1975–76	University of the East (11)	University of Santo Tomas (2)
39	1976–77	University of Santo Tomas (6)	University of Santo Tomas (3)
40	1977–78	University of the Philippines Diliman (1)	University of the Philippines Diliman (6)

=== Second expansion ===
Ateneo was accepted as a member in 1978.

Season	Year	Men's	Women's
41	1978–79	University of the Philippines Diliman (2)	Far Eastern University (18)
42	1979–80	University of the Philippines Diliman (3)	University of the Philippines Diliman (7)
43	1980–81	University of the Philippines Diliman (4)	University of Santo Tomas (4)
44	1981–82	University of the East (12)	Far Eastern University (19)
45	1982–83	Adamson University (1)	University of the Philippines Diliman (8)
46	1983–84	Adamson University (2)	Far Eastern University (20)
47	1984–85	Adamson University (3)	University of Santo Tomas (5)
48	1985–86	University of Santo Tomas (7)	University of Santo Tomas (6)

=== Third expansion ===
La Salle was accepted as a member in 1986.

Season	Year	Men's	Women's
49	1986–87	University of Santo Tomas (8)	University of Santo Tomas (7)
50	1987–88	Far Eastern University (13)	University of Santo Tomas (8)
51	1988–89	Far Eastern University (14)	University of Santo Tomas (9)
52	1989–90	University of Santo Tomas (9)	University of Santo Tomas (10)
53	1990–91	Far Eastern University (15)	University of Santo Tomas (11)
54	1991–92	Far Eastern University (16)	Far Eastern University (21)
55	1992–93	University of Santo Tomas (10)	Far Eastern University (22)

=== Final Four era ===
Current tournament format introduced. Tournament for juniors' division are added on the second year of implementation of Final Four.

Season	Year	Men's	Women's	Boys'	Girls'
56	1993–94	Far Eastern University (17)	University of Santo Tomas (12)	No tournament	
57	1994–95	Far Eastern University (18)	Far Eastern University (23)	De La Salle Zobel (1)	De La Salle Zobel (1)
58	1995–96	University of Santo Tomas (11)	Far Eastern University (24)	De La Salle Zobel (2)	De La Salle Zobel (2)
59	1996–97	Far Eastern University (19)	University of Santo Tomas (13)	De La Salle Zobel (3)	De La Salle Zobel (3)
60	1997–98	Far Eastern University (20)	University of Santo Tomas (14)	De La Salle Zobel (4)	De La Salle Zobel (4)
61	1998–99	University of Santo Tomas (12)	Far Eastern University (25)	De La Salle Zobel (5)	De La Salle Zobel (5)
62	1999–00	Far Eastern University (21)	De La Salle University (1)	De La Salle Zobel (6)	University of the East (1)
63	2000–01	University of Santo Tomas (13)	Far Eastern University (26)	University of the East (1)	University of the East (2)
64	2001–02	De La Salle University (1)	Far Eastern University (27)	University of the East (2)	University of the East (3)
65	2002–03	University of Santo Tomas (14)	Far Eastern University (28)	University of the East (3)	De La Salle Zobel (6)
66	2003–04	De La Salle University (2)	De La Salle University (2)	De La Salle Zobel (7)	University of Santo Tomas (1)
67	2004–05	Far Eastern University (22)	De La Salle University (3)	University of the East (4)	University of Santo Tomas (2)
68	2005–06	Far Eastern University (23)	De La Salle University (4)	University of the East (5)	University of the East (4)
69	2006–07	Far Eastern University (24)	University of Santo Tomas (15)	University of the East (6)	University of the East (5)
70	2007–08	University of Santo Tomas (15)	Far Eastern University (29)	University of the East (7)	University of Santo Tomas (3)
71	2008–09	University of Santo Tomas (16)	De La Salle University (5)	University of the East (8)	University of Santo Tomas (4)
72	2009–10	University of Santo Tomas (17)	University of Santo Tomas (16)	University of the East (9)	University of Santo Tomas (5)
73	2010–11	University of Santo Tomas (18)	De La Salle University (6)	University of the East (10)	De La Salle Zobel (7)
74	2011–12	Far Eastern University (25)	De La Salle University (7)	University of the East (11)	De La Salle Zobel (8)
75	2012–13	National University (1)	De La Salle University (8)	University of the East (12)	De La Salle Zobel (9)
76	2013–14	National University (2)	Ateneo de Manila University (1)	University of the East (13)	University of Santo Tomas (6)
77	2014–15	Ateneo de Manila University (1)	Ateneo de Manila University (2)	University of the East (14)	National University (1)
78	2015–16	Ateneo de Manila University (2)	De La Salle University (9)	National University (1)	National University (2)
79	2016–17	Ateneo de Manila University (3)	De La Salle University (10)	National University (2)	National University (3)
80	2017–18	National University (3)	De La Salle University (11)	University of Santo Tomas (1)	National University (4)
81	2018–19	National University (4)	Ateneo de Manila University (3)	National University (3)	De La Salle Zobel (10)
82	2019–20	Tournaments discontinued due to COVID-19 pandemic		National University (4)	National University (5)
83	2020–21	Season 83 not held due to COVID-19 pandemic			
84	2021–22	Tournament not held due to COVID-19 pandemic	National University (3)	Tournaments not held due to COVID-19 pandemic	
85	2022–23	National University (5)	De La Salle University (12)	Far Eastern University (1)	National University (6)
86	2023–24	National University (6)	National University (4)	National University (5)	Adamson University (1)
87	2024–25	National University (7)	National University (5)	University of Santo Tomas (2)	National University (7)
88	2025–26	National University (8)	De La Salle University (13)	University of the East (15)	National University (8)
89	2026–27				
90	2027–28				

=== Number of championships by school ===
	Seniors'		Juniors'			
Team	M	W	B	G	Total	Last volleyball championship
Far Eastern University	25	29	1	0	55	Season 85 (2022–23) boys' division
University of Santo Tomas	18	16	2	6	42	Season 87 (2024–25) boys' division
University of the East	12	6	15	5	38	Season 88 (2025–26) boys' division
De La Salle University	2	13	7	10	32	Season 88 (2025–26) women's division
National University	8	5	5	8	26	Season 88 (2025–26) men's division
University of the Philippines Diliman	4	8	0	0	12	Season 45 (1982–83) women's division
Ateneo de Manila University	3	3	0	0	6	Season 81 (2018–19) women's division
Adamson University	3	0	0	1	4	Season 86 (2023–24) girls' division
Manila Central University (Note: Manila Central University pulled out of the UAAP in 1962.)	0	2	0	0	2	Season 24 (1961–62) women's division

== Statistics (Final Four Era) ==
- Longest Finals appearance streaks:
  - Boys'
    - University of the East (16): Season 63 (2000) - Season 78 (2015)
  - Girls'
    - National University (12): Season 75 (2012) - Season 88 (2026) [No tournaments held in Season 83 (2020) - Season 84 (2021)]
  - Men's
    - National University (11): Season 75 (2013) - Season 88 (2026) [No tournaments held in Season 82 (2020) - Season 84 (2022)]
  - Women's
    - De La Salle University (10): Season 71 (2009) - Season 80 (2018)
- Longest Finals matchup appearance streaks:
  - Boys'
    - De La Salle University vs. University of Santo Tomas (3): Season 60 (1997) - Season 62 (1999)
    - University of the East vs. University of Santo Tomas (3): Season 72 (2009) - Season 74 (2011)
  - Girls'
    - De La Salle University vs. University of Santo Tomas (7): Season 66 (2003) - Season 72 (2009)
  - Men's
    - Far Eastern University vs. University of Santo Tomas (5): Season 59 (1996) - Season 63 (2000)
    - Ateneo de Manila University vs. National University (5): Season 76 (2014) - Season 80 (2018)
  - Women's
    - Ateneo de Manila University vs. De La Salle University (6): Season 74 (2012) - Season 79 (2017)
- Longest Final Four appearance streaks:
  - Boys'
    - University of the East (23): Season 58 (1995) - Season 80 (2017)
  - Girls'
    - University of Santo Tomas (23): Season 64 (2001) - Season 88 (2026)
  - Men's
    - Far Eastern University (15): Season 56 (1993) - Season 70 (2008)
  - Women's
    - Far Eastern University (16): Season 56 (1993) - Season 71 (2009)
    - De La Salle University (16): Season 71 (2009) - Season 88 (2026)
- Longest Final Four appearance drought:
  - Boys'
    - University of the Philippines (17): Season 70 (2007) - Season 88 (2026)
  - Girls'
    - University of the Philippines (12): Season 75 (2012) - Season 88 (2026)
  - Men's
    - University of the East (30): Season 56 (1993) - Season 88 (2026)
  - Women's
    - National University (19): Season 56 (1993) - Season 74 (2011)
- Longest championship streaks:
  - Boys'
    - University of the East (11): Season 67 (2004) - Season 77 (2015)
  - Girls'
    - De La Salle University (5): Season 57 (1994) - Season 61 (1998)
  - Men's
    - National University (6): Season 80 (2018) - Season 88 (2026) [No tournaments held in Season 82 (2020) - Season 84 (2022)]
  - Women's
    - De La Salle University (3): Season 66 (2003) - Season 68 (2005), Season 73 (2011) - Season 75 (2013), Season 78 (2016) - Season 80 (2018)
    - Far Eastern University (3): Season 63 (2000) - Season 65 (2002)
- Longest single-season winning streaks (no losses within a season):
  - Men's
    - University of Santo Tomas (17–0): Perfect Season in Season 71
    - Ateneo de Manila University (16–0): Perfect Season in Season 79
    - National University (16–0): Perfect Season in Season 85
  - Women's
    - Ateneo de Manila University (16–0): Perfect Season in Season 77
    - National University (16–0): Perfect Season in Season 84
    - De La Salle University (16–0): Perfect Season in Season 88
- Longest winning streaks (by games or covered seasons):
  - Men's
    - National University (34 games, 3 seasons): 16 (2nd game in group stage to Finals) in Season 81 + 2 (only 2 games of group stage) in Season 82 + no tournament in Seasons 83 and 84 + 16 (entire season) in Season 85
  - Women's
    - De La Salle University (30 games, 2 seasons): 16 (2nd game in group stage to Finals) in Season 75 + 14 (group stage) in Season 76
- Most Games Played in a Season:
  - Men's
    - University of Santo Tomas (19): 14 (group stage) + 2 (Regular Final Four) + 3 (Finals) in Season 70
    - National University (19): 14 (group stage) + 2 (Regular Final Four) + 3 (Finals) in Season 87
  - Women's
    - Ateneo de Manila University (21): 14 (group stage) + 3 (Stepladder Final Four) + 4 (Finals) in Season 76
- Elimination sweeps

Division	Team	Season(s)
Girls'	Nazareth School of National University	Season 79 (2016), Season 82 (2019), Season 85 (2022)
Girls'	De La Salle Zobel	Season 73 (2010), Season 74 (2011)
Girls'	Adamson University	Season 86 (2024)
Girls'	University of Santo Tomas	Season 71 (2008)
Boys'	University of the East	Season 71 (2008), Season 73 (2010), Season 74 (2011), Season 77 (2014)
Boys'	Nazareth School of National University	Season 78 (2015)
Women's	De La Salle University	Season 74 (2012), Season 76 (2013), Season 88 (2026)
Women's	Ateneo de Manila University	Season 77 (2014)
Women's	National University	Season 84 (2022)
Men's	National University	Season 85 (2023)
Men's	Ateneo de Manila University	Season 79 (2017)
Men's	University of Santo Tomas	Season 71 (2009)

== Special awards ==
=== Most valuable players ===
UAAP Season	Seniors' division		Juniors' division	
UAAP Season	Men's division	Women's division	Boys' division	Girls' division
59 (1996–97)	Herminio Gallo Jr.	Roxanne Pimentel		
60 (1997–98)		Joan Botor		
61 (1998–99)	Oliver John Manlapaz	Precilla Delos Angeles		
62 (1999–00)	Byron Gementiza	Iris Ortega		
63 (2000–01)		Ailyn Ege		
64 (2001–02)		Ailyn Ege		
65 (2002–03)	Anthony Irvin Guiao	Ailyn Ege	Jerico Magno	Priscilla Mae Trinidad
66 (2003–04)	Janley Patrona	Desiree Hernandez	Mark Paul Trinidad	
67 (2004–05)	Rolan Macahia	Maureen Penetrante		
68 (2005–06)	Jeremy Floyd Pedregosa	Desiree Hernandez		Danica Ayala
69 (2006–07)	Edjet Mabbayad	Venus Bernal		Danica Ayala
70 (2007–08)	Nazareno Roque	Wendy Anne Semana		Alyssa Valdez
71 (2008–09)	Ray Karl Dimaculangan	Manilla Santos	Michael Reyes	Alyssa Valdez
72 (2009–10)	Andre Joseph Pareja (season); Henry James Pecaña (finals)	Cherry May Vivas (season); Rhea Dimaculangan (finals)	Morrissey Claude Garcia	Alyssa Valdez
73 (2010–11)	John Paul Torres (season); Jayson Ramos (finals)	Jacqueline Alarca (season); Charleen Abigaile Cruz (finals)	Kim Gerald Relcopan	Kim Kianna Dy
74 (2011–12)	Jayson Ramos (season); Rodolfo Labrador Jr. (finals)	Abigail Maraño (season); Charleen Abigaile Cruz (finals)	Edward Camposano	Julienne Calugcug
75 (2012–13)	Mark Gil Alfafara and Red Christensen (season); Peter Den Mar Torres (finals)	Abigail Maraño (season) and Victonara Galang (season); Michele Gumabao (finals)	Edward Camposano	Alessandra Isabel Narciso
76 (2013–14)	Marck Jesus Espejo (season); Rueben Inaudito (finals)	Alyssa Valdez (season & Finals)	Edward Camposano	Ennajie Laure
77 (2014–15)	Marck Jesus Espejo (season); Esmilzo Joner Polvorosa (finals)	Alyssa Valdez (season); Amy Ahomiro (finals)	Ron Adrian Medalla	Faith Janine Shirley Nisperos (season)
78 (2015–16)	Marck Jesus Espejo (season); Ysrael Wilson Marasigan (finals)	Alyssa Valdez (season); Kim Kianna Dy (finals)	Shaun Christopher Ledesma (season); Raymart Reyes (finals)	Ejiya Laure (season) Faith Janine Shirley Nisperos (finals)
79 (2016–17)	Marck Jesus Espejo (season); Antony Paul Koyfman (finals)	Mary Joy Baron (season); Desiree Cheng (finals)	Lorence Cruz (season); Billie Jean Anima (finals)	Faith Janine Shirley Nisperos (season); Princess Anne Robles (finals)
80 (2017–18)	Marck Jesus Espejo (season); Bryan Bagunas (finals)	Jaja Santiago (season); Dawn Macandili (finals)	Mark Frederick Calado (season); Jaron Requinton (finals)	Mhicaela Belen (season); Faith Janine Shirley Nisperos (finals)
81 (2018–19)	Bryan Bagunas (season and Finals)	Sisi Rondina (season); Isabel Beatriz De Leon (finals)	Jose Javelona (season); Mac Bandola (finals)	Angel Anne Canino (season); Justine Ylizyeth Jazareno (finals)
82 (2019–20)	Not awarded. Tournaments discontinued due to COVID-19 pandemic		Rans Wesley Cajolo (season); Mac Bandola (finals)	Mhicaela Belen (season); Evangeline Alinsug (finals)
83 (2020–21)	Season 83 not held due to COVID-19 pandemic			
84 (2021–22)	Tournament not held due to COVID-19 pandemic	Mhicaela Belen (season); Princess Anne Robles (finals)	Tournaments not held due to COVID-19 pandemic	
85 (2022–23)	Joshua Ybañez (season); Ave Joshua Retamar (finals)	Angel Anne Canino (season); Marionne Angelique Alba (finals)	Eugenio Gloria (season); Rhodson Du-ot (finals)	Kianne Olango (season); Abegail Pono (finals)
86 (2023–24)	Joshua Ybañez (season); Ave Joshua Retamar (finals)	Mhicaela Belen (season); Alyssa Jae Solomon (finals)	Joncriz Ayco (season); Jeff Gallego (finals)	Shaina Nitura (season and finals)
87 (2024–25)	Kennedy Batas (season); Leo Aringo (finals)	Mhicaela Belen (season); Evangeline Alinsug and Shaira Jardio (finals)	Christian Antonio (season); Kalel Legaspi (finals)	Samantha Cantada (season); Harlyn Serneche (finals)
88 (2025–26)	Josh Ybañez (season); Leo Ordiales (finals)	Shaina Nitura (season); Shevana Laput (finals)	Rainier Lorayes (season); Paul Roque (finals)	Diza Mae Beyaro (season); Rain Navaro (finals)
89 (2026–27)	(season) (finals)	(season) (finals)	(season) (finals)	(season) (finals)
90 (2027–28)	(season) (finals)	(season) (finals)	(season) (finals)	(season) (finals)

=== Rookie of the Year ===
UAAP Season	Seniors' division		Juniors' division	
UAAP Season	Men's division	Women's division	Boys' division	Girls' division
63 (2000–01)		Beverly Benin		
64 (2001–02)		Javier		
65 (2002–03)		Suzanne Roces		
66 (2003–04)		Ma. Rosario Soriano		
67 (2004–05)		Mary Jean Balse	Joshua Rei Villaroman	
68 (2005–06)		Lilet Mabbayad		
69 (2006–07)	Marlon Macabulos	Mecaila Irish May Morada		
70 (2007–08)	Jayson Ramos	Ma. Carmina Denise Acevedo		
71 (2008–09)	Duane Craig Teves	Melissa Gohing	Karl Roque	Jelly Buan
72 (2009–10)	Christopher Michael Antonio	Joanne Siy		Jaja Santiago
73 (2010–11)	Peter Den Mar Torres	Maria Mikaela Esperanza	Edward Camposano	Alessandra Isabel Narciso
74 (2011–12)	Vince Mangulabnan	Victonara Galang	Christian Gopio	Christine Mhae Tolentino
75 (2012–13)	Karlle Nikko Ramirez	Aiko Sweet Urdas	Vincent Magdaong	Ejiya Laure
76 (2013–14)	Marck Jesus Espejo	Jaja Santiago	Armel Amuan	Faith Janine Shirley Nisperos
77 (2014–15)	Edward Camposano	Ennajie Laure and Kath Arado	Raymart Reyes	Rachelle Anne Fabro
78 (2015–16)	James Martin Natividad	Maria Lina Isabel Molde	Noel Kampton	Thea Gagate
79 (2016–17)	Chumason Celestine Njigha	Julianne Marie Samonte	Raymond Bryce De Guzman	Kathleen Keith Layugan
80 (2017–18)	Ariel Morado Jr.	Milena Alessandrini	CJ Segui	Alyssa Jae Solomon
81 (2018–19)	Angelo Nicolas Almendras	Ejiya Laure		
82 (2019–20)	Not awarded. Tournaments discontinued due to COVID-19 pandemic		Brent Ydward Maralit	Ela Marjanna Raagas
83 (2020–21)	Season 83 not held due to COVID-19 pandemic			
84 (2021–22)	Tournament not held due to COVID-19 pandemic	Mhicaela Belen	Tournaments not held due to COVID-19 pandemic	
85 (2022–23)	Joshua Ybañez	Angel Anne Canino	Herbert Miguel Egger	Janessa Buhay
86 (2023–24)	Jade Alex Disquitado	Angeline Poyos	Joncriz Ayco	Samantha Chloey Cantada
87 (2024–25)	Jan Julian Macam	Shaina Nitura	Kenneth Maliwanag	Ellaine Gonzalvo
88 (2025–26)	Richard Besorio	Samantha Chloey Cantada	Justine Ray John Jusayan	Jhaynna Love Bulandres
89 (2026–27)				
90 (2027–28)				

== Individual awards ==
=== Men's Division ===
UAAP Season	Awards						
UAAP Season	Best Scorer	Best Attacker	Best Blocker	Best Setter	Best Server	Best Receiver	Best Digger
69 (2006–07)	Jerome Liñgo	Jeremy Pedregosa	Lloyd Arden Belgado	Guarenio Gianan	Jessie Lopez	Mark Sibug	Virgilio Vizcarra
70 (2007–08)	Edjet Mabbayad	Edjet Mabbayad	Chris Macasaet	Jessie Lopez	Ray Karl Dimaculangan	Francisco Dela Cruz	Charles Glendon Reyes
71 (2008–09)	—N/a	Jayson Ramos	Lloyd Arden Belgado	Gerald Magtoto	Ray Karl Dimaculangan	Henry James Pecaña	Bernardino Lorenz Casanova
72 (2009–10)	Chris Macasaet	Andre Joseph Pareja	Lloyd Arden Belgado	Gerald Magtoto	Ray Karl Dimaculangan	Richard Rosero	Amenolah Acot
73 (2010–11)	John Paul Torres	John Paul Torres	Niño Jeruz	Pitrus Paolo De Ocampo	Pitrus Paolo De Ocampo	Paul Jan Doloiras	Gilbert Longavela
74 (2011–12)	Rodolfo Labrador Jr.	Peter Den Mar Torres	Rueben Inaudito	Pitrus Paolo De Ocampo	John Hendrix Competente	Paul Jan Doloiras	Gilbert Longavela
75 (2012–13)	Ron Jay Galang	Peter Den Mar Torres	Mark Gil Alfafara	Vincent Mangulabnan	Arvin Avila	Arvin Avila	Carlo Almario
76 (2013–14)	Mark Gil Alfafara	Mark Gil Alfafara	Julius Raymundo	Esmilzo Joner Polvorosa	Mark Gil Alfafara	John Paul Pareja	Rence Melgar
77 (2014–15)	Mark Gil Alfafara	Marck Jesus Espejo	Peter Den Mar Torres	Esmilzo Joner Polvorosa	Vincent Mangulabnan	Rence Melgar	Rence Melgar
78 (2015–16)	Raymark Woo	Marck Jesus Espejo	Edward Camposano	Esmilzo Joner Polvorosa	Marck Jesus Espejo	Rikko Marius Marmeto	Ricky Marcos
79 (2016–17)	Marck Jesus Espejo	Marck Jesus Espejo	John Paul Bugaoan	Esmilzo Joner Polvorosa	Bryan Bagunas	Rikko Marius Marmeto	Ricky Marcos
80 (2017–18)	Marck Jesus Espejo	Marck Jesus Espejo	Jayvee Sumagaysay	Esmilzo Joner Polvorosa	Marck Jesus Espejo	Rikko Marius Marmeto	Jopet Movido

UAAP Season	Awards							
UAAP Season	1st Best Outside Hitter	2nd Best Outside Hitter	1st Best Middle Blocker	2nd Best Middle Blocker	Best Opposite Hitter	Best Setter	Best Libero	Best Server
81 (2018–19)	Bryan Bagunas	Jude Garcia	John Paul Bugaoan	Chumason Celestine Njigha	James Martin Natividad	Lawrence Gil Magadia	Manuel Sumanguid	Bryan Bagunas
82 (2019–20)	Not awarded. Tournament discontinued due to COVID-19 pandemic							
83 (2020–21)	Tournament not held due to COVID-19 pandemic							
84 (2021–22)	Tournament not held due to COVID-19 pandemic							
85 (2022–23)	Joshua Ybañez	Michaelo Buddin	Obed Mukaba	Billie Jean-Henri Anima	Jay Rack De La Noche	Ave Joshua Retamar	Lance Andrei De Castro	—N/a
86 (2023–24)	Joshua Ybañez	Angelo Nicolas Almendras	Martin Bugaoan	Nathaniel Del Pilar	Zhydryx Saavedra	Ave Joshua Retamar	Menard Guerrero	—N/a
87 (2024–25)	Kennedy Batas	Jan Julian Macam	Edlyn Paul Colinares	Mark Leo Coguimbal	Amil Pacinio, Jr.	Dux Yambao	Menard Guerrero	—N/a
88 (2025–26)	Joshua Ybañez	Michaelo Buddin	Issa Ousseini	Lirick John Mendoza	Leo Ordiales	Ariel Cacao	Vennie Paul Ceballos	—N/a
89 (2026–27)								—N/a
90 (2027–28)								—N/a

=== Women's Division ===
UAAP Season	Awards						
UAAP Season	Best Scorer	Best Attacker	Best Blocker	Best Setter	Best Server	Best Receiver	Best Digger
Season 69 (2006–07)	Venus Bernal	Mary Ann Manalo	Bea Sharmaine Pascual	Denise Patricia Tan	Rachel Daquis	Donaleil Adajar	Patricia Lynn Taganas
Season 70 (2007–08)	Maria Rosario Soriano	Mary Jean Balse	Celine Anne Hernandez	Janet Serafica	Rissa Jane Laguiles	Maria Rosario Soriano	Lizlee Ann Gata
Season 71 (2008–09)	Aiza Maizo	Aiza Maizo	Jacqueline Alarca	April Linor Jose	Mecaila Irish May Morada	Manilla Santos	Lizlee Ann Gata
Season 72 (2009–10)	Cherry May Vivas	Pau Soriano	Joanne Siy	Jamenea Ferrer	Rhea Dimaculangan	Lizlee Ann Gata	Lizlee Ann Gata
Season 73 (2010–11)	Aiza Maizo	Jacqueline Alarca	Michele Gumabao	Jamenea Ferrer	Jacqueline Alarca	Aiza Maizo	Jennylyn Reyes
Season 74 (2011–12)	Rosemarie Vargas	Maika Ortiz	Michele Gumabao	Gyzelle Sy	Victonara Galang	Angelica Vasquez	Christine Agno
Season 75 (2012–13)	Alyssa Valdez	Myla Pablo	Abigail Maraño	Jamenea Ferrer	Shiela Pineda	Jennylyn Reyes	Jennylyn Reyes
Season 76 (2013–14)	Alyssa Valdez	Dindin Santiago	Katherine Adrielle Bersola	Kim Fajardo	Alyssa Valdez	Dennise Michelle Lazaro	Dennise Michelle Lazaro
Season 77 (2014–15)	Alyssa Valdez	Jaja Santiago	Marivic Velaine Meneses	Julia Melissa Morado	Alyssa Valdez	Dennise Michelle Lazaro	Christine Agno
Season 78 (2015–16)	Alyssa Valdez	Jaja Santiago	Mary Joy Baron	Kim Fajardo	Alyssa Valdez	Dawn Macandili	Dawn Macandili
Season 79 (2016–17)	Jaja Santiago	Jaja Santiago	Jaja Santiago	Kim Fajardo	Kim Fajardo	Dawn Macandili	Kath Arado
Season 80 (2017–18)	Sisi Rondina	Jaja Santiago	Celine Elaiza Domingo	Ma. Deanna Izabella Wong	Desiree Wynea Cheng	Kath Arado	Kath Arado

UAAP Season	Awards							
UAAP Season	1st Best Outside Hitter	2nd Best Outside Hitter	1st Best Middle Blocker	2nd Best Middle Blocker	Best Opposite Hitter	Best Setter	Best Libero	Best Server
81 (2018–19)	Ejiya Laure	Sisi Rondina	Roselyn Doria	Madeleine Yrenea Madayag	Katrina Mae Tolentino	Laizah Ann Bendong	Kath Arado	Princess Anne Robles
82 (2019–20)	Not awarded. Tournament discontinued due to COVID-19 pandemic							
83 (2020–21)	Tournament not held due to COVID-19 pandemic							
84 (2021–22)	Mhicaela Belen	Faith Nisperos	Thea Allison Gagate	Sheena Toring	Alyssa Jae Solomon	Camilla Lamina	Jennifer Nierva	—N/a
85 (2022–23)	Jolina Dela Cruz	Angel Anne Canino	Thea Allison Gagate	Niña Ytang	Jovelyn Fernandez	Marionne Angelique Alba	Ma. Bernadett Pepito	—N/a
86 (2023–24)	Mhicaela Belen	Angeline Poyos	Thea Allison Gagate	Niña Ytang	Alyssa Jae Solomon	Ma. Cassandra Rae Carballo	Ma. Bernadett Pepito	—N/a
87 (2024–25)	Mhicaela Belen	Angel Anne Canino	Amie Provido	Niña Ytang	Shevana Maria Nicola Laput	Camilla Lamina	Lyka De Leon	—N/a
88 (2025–26)	Shaina Nitura	Angel Anne Canino	Amie Provido	Niña Ytang	Shevana Maria Nicola Laput	Felicity Sagaysay	Shaira Jardio	—N/a
89 (2026–27)								—N/a
90 (2027–28)								—N/a

=== Boys' Division ===
UAAP Season	Awards						
UAAP Season	Best Scorer	Best Attacker	Best Blocker	Best Setter	Best Server	Best Receiver	Best Libero
73 (2010–11)	-	Mark Carlo Pangan	Carl Michael Manuel	Geuel Asia	Kim Gerald Relcopan	Darren De Dios	Manuel Sumanguid III
74 (2011–12)	-	Edward Camposano	Edward Camposano	Geuel Asia	Wesley Fabroa	Carl Roque	Manuel Sumanguid III
75 (2012–13)	-	Edward Camposano	Edward Camposano	Evander Monsanto		Lester Kim Sawal	Manuel Sumanguid III
76 (2013–14)	-	Edward Camposano	Kim Adriano	Adrian Rafael Imperial	Ron Adrian Medalla	Richmond Crisostomo	Manuel Sumanguid III
77 (2014–15)	-	Joshua Umandal	Gian Carlo Glorioso	Adrian Rafael Imperial	Sebastian Enrique Cuerva	Dazyl June Cayamso	Ralph Ryan Imperial
78 (2015–16)	Shaun Ledesma	Noel Kampton	Billie Jean-Henri Anima	Ralph Imperial		Marc Caballero	Eduardo Manuel

UAAP Season	Awards							
UAAP Season	1st Best Outside Hitter	2nd Best Outside Hitter	1st Best Middle Blocker	2nd Best Middle Blocker	Best Opposite Hitter	Best Setter	Best Libero	Best Server
79 (2016–17)	Lorence Cruz	Shaun Christopher Ledesma	Billie Jean-Henri Anima	Jaron Requinton	Lorenz Señoron	Diogenes Poquita III	Menard Guerrero	Rey De Vega
80 (2017–18)	Mark Frederick Calado	Lorence Cruz	Jaron Requnton	Lloyd Josafat	Lorenz Senoron	Benny Martinez	Menard Guerrero	Rey De Vega
81 (2018–19)	Jose Magdalino Javelona	Rey Miguel De Vega	Nathaniel Del Pilar	Jomar Ocampo	Lorenz Senoron	Diogenes Poquita III	Van Tracy Prudenciado	Rey De Vega
82 (2019–20)	Francis Louis Babon	Rey Miguel De Vega	Edlyn Paul Colinares	Angelo Lipata	Rans Wesley Cajolo	Benny Martinez	Menard Guerrero	—N/a
83 (2020–21)	Tournament not held due to COVID-19 pandemic							
84 (2021–22)	Tournament not held due to COVID-19 pandemic							
85 (2022–23)	Andrei Delicana	Jan Julian Macam	Herbert Miguel Egger	Patrick Lardizabal	Amet Bituin	Jeffe Gallego Jr.	Edriel Alavar	—N/a
86 (2023–24)	Jon Paolo Medino	Kyle Clarence Tandoc	Crisean Cruz	Herbert Miguel Egger	Joncriz Ayco	Rhodson Du-ot	John Ian Guevarra	—N/a
87 (2024–25)	Christian Antonio	Zedrick Calimlim	Herbert Miguel Egger	Clarence Gianan	Kenneth Maliwanag	Kalel Ronquillo	John Ian Guevarra	—N/a
88 (2025–26)	Rainier Lorayes	Karl Escobal	Ronnie Millan	Ron De Vera	Xandrex Ragusta	Brix Landicho	John Ian Guevarra	—N/a
89 (2026–27)								—N/a
90 (2027–28)								—N/a

=== Girls' Division ===
UAAP Season	Awards						
UAAP Season	Best Scorer	Best Attacker	Best Blocker	Best Setter	Best Server	Best Receiver	Best Libero
72 (2009–10)	-	Alyssa Valdez		Kim Fajardo	Midori Hirotsuji		
73 (2010–11)	-	Eunique Chan	Anna Patricia Coronel	Alexine Cabanos	Marie Nicole Vasquez	Niña Baltazar	Jeannrey Leigh Yap
74 (2011–12)	-		Kim Kianna Dy		Ennajie Laure		
75 (2012–13)	-	Jaja Santiago	Kim Kianna Dy	Alessandra Isabel Narciso		Ennajie Laure	Dawn Macandili
76 (2013–14)	-	Ennajie Laure	Pauline Gaston	Ejiya Laure	Marites Pablo	Felicia Marie Cui	Kristine Magallanes
77 (2014–15)	-	Ejiya Laure	Pauline Gaston	Rica Diolan	Jennifer Nierva	Mildred Dizon	Kristine Magallanes
78 (2015–16)	Julianne Marie Samonte	Faith Janine Shirley Nisperos	Sheena Toring	Joyme Cagande		Ma. Bernadett Pepito	Bela Peralta

UAAP Season	Awards							
UAAP Season	1st Best Outside Hitter	2nd Best Outside Hitter	1st Best Middle Blocker	2nd Best Middle Blocker	Best Opposite Hitter	Best Setter	Best Libero	Best Server
79 (2016–17)	Faith Janine Shirley Nisperos	Baby Love Barbon	Thea Gagate	Jewel Encarnacion	Ejiya Laure	Joyme Cagande	Ma. Bernadett Pepito	Justine Jazareno
80 (2017–18)	Faith Janine Shirley Nisperos	Angel Anne Canino	Imee Kim Hernandez	Alexis Miner	Ejiya Laure	Joyme Cagande	Ma. Bernadett Pepito	Justine Jazareno
81 (2018–19)	Angel Anne Canino	Alleiah Jan Malaluan	Mayang Nuique	Alexis Miner	Ayesha Tara Juegos	Camilla Lamina	Ma. Bernadett Pepito	Alleiah Jan Malaluan
82 (2019–20)	Mhicaela Belen	Kate Nhorrylle Santiago	Alexis Ciarra Miner	Athena Sophia Abbu	Alyssa Jae Solomon	Camilla Victoria Lamina	Ma. Bernadett Pepito	—N/a
83 (2020–21)	Tournament not held due to COVID-19 pandemic							
84 (2021–22)	Tournament not held due to COVID-19 pandemic							
85 (2022–23)	Shaina Nitura	Celine Elizabeth Marsh	Klarisse Loresco	Margarette Althea	Kianne Louise Olango	Abegail Pono	Juris Manuel	—N/a
86 (2023–24)	Shaina Nitura	Celine Elizabeth Marsh	Bienne Bansil	MG del Moral	Kianne Louise Olango	Felicity Sagaysay	IC Cepada	—N/a
87 (2024–25)	Samantha Cantada	Denesse Daylisan	Avril Bron	Lianne Penuliar	Aleah Devosora	Sheena Cafe	Angel Cenizal	—N/a
88 (2025–26)	Diza Marie Berayo	Kimberly Rubin	Cathlyn Umal	Anya Callo	Ifnanya Udeagbala	Sabina Mikaela Valdez	Mariana Pineda	—N/a
89 (2026–27)								—N/a
90 (2027–28)								—N/a

== Final Four ==
The Final Four for Volleyball was instituted in Season 56 (1993–94). That year, the UAAP declared that there will be a Final Four in all mandatory sports. In 2004, there was no Final Four since the DLSU Lady Spikers swept the double round-robin and were awarded the championship outright, becoming the only volleyball varsity team in the UAAP to win the championship outright with a 14-0 group stage sweep record. In 2007, following the loss of the UE Red Warriors to the DLSU Green Archers in the Finals series of the UAAP Season 70 basketball tournaments despite UE's group stage sweep, the UAAP Final Four format was modified for elimination sweep cases.

The stepladder format was introduced beginning 2008 for all UAAP sports. Until 2015, in the earlier stepladder format, the no. 1 seed team was automatically qualified to a Finals berth with a thrice-to-beat incentive (and thus reformatting the best-of-three series to a 1-0 incentive lead in a best-of-five series). The other three teams in the top four rankings underwent play-off games to determine which will qualify for a Finals berth. Starting 2016, the thrice-to-beat incentive was removed, reverting to a best-of-three championship series for all sporting events in the UAAP (except football, which is a single-game UAAP championship match). Starting 2023, the twice-to-beat incentive for second-seeded teams in the stepladder format was removed. Other Final Four rules still remain in place.

The UST men's volleyball team's 14-0 perfect group stage record in 2009 was the first to be recorded in UAAP history, but they played based on the regular Final Four format, becoming the only UAAP varsity team to achieve a perfect 17–0 season sweep record. As of 2026, the UST Growling Tigers, DLSU Lady Spikers, the ADMU Blue Eagles (men's and women's volleyball teams), and the NU Bulldogs (men's and women's volleyball teams) achieved the 14-0 elimination sweeps record in the Final Four era of the UAAP collegiate volleyball. The DLSU Lady Spikers is currently the only team to complete multiple season-long elimination sweeps (and full season sweeps) within the 2008–present form of the Final Four era, having achieved it thrice and twice, respectively, while currently holding the longest ongoing appearance in the Final Four (since 2009) of UAAP collegiate volleyball.

In 2014 and 2015, ADMU emerged as the lowest Final Four-seeded volleyball team to ever win the UAAP championship (where they played through the stepladder playoffs format and won over 5 knockout games) as well as the first volleyball varsity team in UAAP history to both win the championship and achieve a perfect 16–0 season sweeps record (from group stage playoffs to championship series), respectively. ADMU also became the first UAAP collegiate team to achieve both the 14-0 group stage and 16–0 season sweeps records for both men's and women's volleyball teams (each at least once), after the former achieved this feat in 2017.

In 2022, NU became the first volleyball varsity team in the UAAP since the COVID-19 pandemic to both win the championship and achieve a perfect 16–0 season sweeps record after ending their 65-year volleyball championship drought in the women's division. In 2023, NU became the first school in UAAP history to record season sweeps records in all of the league's 4 divisions of the volleyball tournament after the men's team won their third consecutive (and fifth overall) championship and achieved a perfect 16–0 season sweeps record. In 2024, the UST Growling Tigers became the lowest Final Four-seeded volleyball team to ever qualify to the UAAP Finals. In 2025, the NU Bulldogs has extended both the longest ongoing appearance in the Finals (since 2013) and consecutive championships (at fifth and seventh overall) of UAAP collegiate volleyball.

- UAAP Men's Volleyball Game Archives
- UAAP Women's Volleyball Game Archives

Men's division
University	Number of appearances	Last appearance	Highest seed
Far Eastern University	25	2026	1st
University of Santo Tomas	22	2026	1st
De La Salle University	18	2025	1st
University of the Philippines Diliman	14	2016	2nd
Adamson University	13	2019	3rd
National University	12	2026	1st
Ateneo de Manila University	8	2026	1st
University of the East	0	-	5th

Women's division
University	Number of appearances	Last appearance	Highest seed
De La Salle University	24	2026	1st
Far Eastern University	23	2025	1st
University of Santo Tomas	22	2026	1st
Adamson Lady Falcons	13	2026	1st
Ateneo de Manila University	12	2022	1st
University of the Philippines Diliman	10	2016	3rd
National University	8	2026	1st
University of the East	8	2007	3rd

== Season rankings ==
The volleyball tournaments in Juniors' division started in Season 57 (1994–1995). The number of schools participating in the girls' division increased to six in Season 76 (2013–14) when Adamson University fielded a team. In Season 77 (2014–15), the number of schools participating in the boys' and girls' divisions increased to seven each as FEU fielded a team in both divisions.

Below are rankings per division per team in the Final Four era:

=== Men's division ===
Team \ Season	56	57	58	59	60	61	62	63	64	65	66	67	68	69	70	71	72	73	74	75	76	77	78	79	80	81	82	83	84	85	86	87	88
Adamson Soaring Falcons	3	X	7	6	4	5	3	5	3	5	4	5	4	6	3	5	8	5	3	4	4	4	3	5	5	4	C	C	C	7	6	7	7
Ateneo Blue Eagles	8	6	8		8	8	8	8	8	8	8	8	8	5	7	4	3	6	7	6	2	1	1	1	2	3	C	C	C	5	5	5	4
De La Salle Green Archers	2	3	2	3	3	3	4	4	1	2	1	3	5	X	6	3	5	4	4	3	5	6	6	6	6	6	C	C	C	4	4	4	5
FEU Tamaraws	1	1	4	1	1	2	1	2	4	4	3	1	1	1	2	6	2	2	1	2	3	5	5	3	3	2	C	C	C	3	3	2	2
NU Bulldogs	7	7	6	7	6	4	7	3	5	7	7	7	7	4	8	8	7	7	5	1	1	2	2	2	1	1	C	C	C	1	1	1	1
UE Red Warriors	T5	5	5	5	5	7	5	7	6	6	6	6	6	7	5	7	6	8	8	8	8	8	8	8	8	7	C	C	C	6	8	8	6
UP Fighting Maroons	T5	4	3	4	4	6	6	6	7	3	2	2	3	2	4	2	4	3	6	7	7	7	4	7	7	8	C	C	C	8	7	6	8
UST Growling Tigers	4	2	1	2	2	1	2	1	2	1	5	4	2	3	1	1	1	1	2	5	6	3	7	4	4	5	C	C	C	2	2	3	3

= Did not join; = Champion; = 1st runner-up; = 2nd runner-up; = 4th place; C = Tournament Cancelled; X = Suspended

=== Women's division ===
Team \ Season	56	57	58	59	60	61	62	63	64	65	66	67	68	69	70	71	72	73	74	75	76	77	78	79	80	81	82	83	84	85	86	87	88
Adamson Lady Falcons	3	X	7	7	6	5	3	3	8	8	7	5	2	3	2	4	4	3	5	3	4	7	7	8	5	8	C	C	5	3	7	5	4
Ateneo Blue Eagles	6	5	5	8		8	8	8	6	6	6	7	6	5	4	5	3	4	2	2	1	1	2	2	3	1	C	C	3	6	5	7	7
De La Salle Lady Archers	8	7	8	5	4	2	1	2	2	2	1	1	1	X	6	1	2	1	1	1	2	2	1	1	1	3	C	C	2	1	3	2	1
FEU Lady Tamaraws	2	1	1	2	2	1	4	1	1	1	2	4	3	2	1	2	5	6	4	6	5	4	3	4	2	4	C	C	8	5	4	4	5
NU Lady Bulldogs	7	6	6	6	7	7	7	6	7	7	8	8	8	7	7	8	7	5	7	4	3	3	5	6	4	6	C	C	1	2	1	1	2
UE Lady Warriors	5	4	4	4	5	3	6	5	3	5	4	3	5	4	8	6	8	8	6	8	8	8	8	7	8	7	C	C	7	8	6	8	8
UP Fighting Maroons	4	3	3	3	3	4	5	4	4	4	5	6	7	6	5	7	6	7	8	7	7	6	4	5	6	5	C	C	6	7	8	6	6
UST Golden Tigresses	1	2	2	1	1	6	2	7	5	3	3	2	4	1	3	3	1	2	3	5	6	5	6	3	7	2	C	C	4	4	2	3	3

= Did not join; = Champion; = 1st runner-up; = 2nd runner-up; = 4th place; C = Tournament Cancelled; X = Suspended

=== Boys' division ===
Team \ Season	57	58	59	60	61	62	63	64	65	66	67	68	69	70	71	72	73	74	75	76	77	78	79	80	81	82	83	84	85	86	87	88
Adamson Baby Falcons																							7	7	4	5	C	C	5	5	4	5
Ateneo Blue Eaglets	2	5	3	4	3	4	2	2	4	4	2	3	3	3	2	3	5	4	4	3	2	4	5	6	7	7	C	C	6	8	7	8
Zobel Junior Archers	1	1	1	1	1	1	4	4	2	1	4	4	X	2	4	6	4	5	5	5	5	6	6	5	6	6	C	C	7	6	6	6
FEU–D Baby Tamaraws																					6	3	4	2	2	2	C	C	1	3	5	3
NUNS Bullpups	4	6	5		6	6	6	6								4	3	3	2	2	3	1	1	3	1	1	C	C	2	1	2	2
UE Junior Red Warriors	5	2	2	3	4	3	1	1	1	2	1	1	1	1	1	1	1	1	1	1	1	2	3	4	5	3	C	C	3	2	3	1
UPIS Junior Fighting Maroons	6	3	4	5	5	5	5	5	5	5	5	5	4	5	5	5	6	6	6	6	7	7	8	8	8		C	C		7	8	7
UST Tiger Cubs	3	4	6	2	2	2	3	3	3	3	3	2	2	4	3	2	2	2	3	4	4	5	2	1	3	4	C	C	4	4	1	4

= Did not join; = Champion; = 1st runner-up; = 2nd runner-up; = 4th place; C = Tournament Cancelled; X = Suspended

=== Girls' division ===
Team \ Season	57	58	59	60	61	62	63	64	65	66	67	68	69	70	71	72	73	74	75	76	77	78	79	80	81	82	83	84	85	86	87	88
Adamson Lady Baby Falcons																				5	4	6	6	5	4	2	C	C	2	1	2	3
Ateneo Lady Eaglets																														6	7	7
Zobel Junior Lady Archers	1	1	1	1	1	4	?	3	1	3	3	3	X	3	3	3	1	1	1	3	3	3	3	3	1	4	C	C	6	5	5	5
FEU–D Lady Baby Tamaraws																					6	5	5	4	5	5	C	C	3	4	4	2
NUNS Lady Bullpups	5	5	5	5	4													5	2	2	1	1	1	1	2	1	C	C	1	2	1	1
UE Junior Lady Warriors	2	3	4	3	3	1	1	1	3	2	2	1	1	2	2	2	2	2	4	4	5	4	4	6	6	6	C	C				8
UP Junior Fighting Maroons	4	4	2	4	5	3	?	4	4	4	4	4	3	4	4	4	3	4	5	6	7	7	7	7	7	7	C	C	5	7	6	6
UST Junior Tigresses	3	2	3	2	2	2	?	2	2	1	1	2	2	1	1	1	4	3	3	1	2	2	2	2	3	3	C	C	4	3	3	4

= Did not join; = Champion; = 1st runner-up; = 2nd runner-up; = 4th place; C = Tournament Cancelled; X = Suspended

== See also ==
- NCAA Volleyball Championship
- Premier Volleyball League
- Maharlika Pilipinas Volleyball Association
- Volleyball in the Philippines
