= UAAP Season 75 volleyball tournaments =

Volleyball tournaments

UAAP Season 75 Volleyball
- Host school: National University
Men's Finals	G1	G2	G3	Wins
NU Bulldogs	3	1	3	2
FEU Tamaraws	2	3	1	1
- Duration: March 02–09, 2013
- Arenas: Smart Araneta Coliseum; Mall of Asia Arena; Filoil Flying V Arena
- Finals MVP: Peter Den Mar Tores
- Winning coach: Dante Alinsunurin
- Semifinalists: De La Salle Green Archers; Adamson Soaring Falcons
- TV networks: Studio 23, The Filipino Channel, Balls, Balls HD
Women's Finals	G1	G2	Wins
De La Salle Lady Archers	3	3	2
Ateneo Lady Eagles	2	0	0
- Duration: March 02–06, 2013
- Arenas: Smart Araneta Coliseum; Mall of Asia Arena
- Finals MVP: Michele Gumabao
- Winning coach: Ramil de Jesus
- Semifinalists: Adamson Lady Falcons; NU Lady Bulldogs
- TV networks: Studio 23, The Filipino Channel, Balls, Balls HD

The seniors' division of the UAAP Season 75 volleyball tournaments opened December 1, 2012. Tournaments are hosted by National University. Tournament games are held at the Filoil Flying V Arena in San Juan, the Mall of Asia Arena in Pasay and the Smart Araneta Coliseum in Quezon City.

== Men's tournament ==
=== Elimination round ===
==== Team standings ====
Pos	Team	Pld	W	L	Pts	SW	SL	SR	SPW	SPL	SPR	Qualification
1	NU Bulldogs (H)	14	12	2	34 (Note: Head-to-head record: NU 1–1 FEU; NU +1)	38	15	2.533	1261	1144	1.102	Twice-to-beat in the semifinals
2	FEU Tamaraws	14	12	2	33	39	15	2.600	1266	1101	1.150	Twice-to-beat in the semifinals
3	De La Salle Green Archers	14	9	5	29 (Note: Head-to-head record: La Salle 2–0 Adamson)	32	18	1.778	1163	1055	1.102	Twice-to-win in the semifinals
4	Adamson Soaring Falcons	14	9	5	25	30	26	1.154	1242	1213	1.024	Twice-to-win in the semifinals
5	UST Growling Tigers	14	7	7	23	27	25	1.080	1175	1153	1.019	
6	Ateneo Blue Eagles	14	3	11	11 (Note: Head-to-head record: Ateneo 1–1 UP; Ateneo +1)	15	34	0.441	1011	1141	0.886	
7	UP Fighting Maroons	14	3	11	10	17	38	0.447	1144	1237	0.925	
8	UE Red Warriors	14	1	13	3	14	41	0.341	1105	1323	0.835	

Source: ABS-CBN Sports
Rules for classification: 1) number of wins; 2) if tied for #2 or #4, one-game playoff; 3) head-to-head record; 4) match points; 5) sets ratio; 6) points ratio
(H) Host

==== Schedule - Result ====
	Round 1							Round 2						
Team ╲ Game	1	2	3	4	5	6	7	8	9	10	11	12	13	14
ADU	FEU school colors	Ateneo school colors	UST school colors	UE school colors	NU school colors	UP school colors	La Salle school colors	UE school colors	NU school colors	UP school colors	La Salle school colors	UST school colors	FEU school colors	Ateneo school colors
ADMU	NU school colors	Adamson school colors	UP school colors	UST school colors	La Salle school colors	FEU school colors	UE school colors	UP school colors	FEU school colors	UE school colors	NU school colors	UST school colors	La Salle school colors	Adamson school colors
DLSU	UST school colors	UE school colors	FEU school colors	NU school colors	Ateneo school colors	UP school colors	Adamson school colors	FEU school colors	UP school colors	NU school colors	Adamson school colors	UE school colors	Ateneo school colors	UST school colors
FEU	Adamson school colors	NU school colors	La Salle school colors	UP school colors	UE school colors	Ateneo school colors	UST school colors	La Salle school colors	Ateneo school colors	UST school colors	UE school colors	Adamson school colors	UP school colors	NU school colors
NU	Ateneo school colors	FEU school colors	UE school colors	La Salle school colors	Adamson school colors	UST school colors	UP school colors	UST school colors	Adamson school colors	La Salle school colors	Ateneo school colors	UE school colors	UP school colors	FEU school colors
UE	UP school colors	La Salle school colors	NU school colors	Adamson school colors	UST school colors	FEU school colors	Ateneo school colors	Adamson school colors	UST school colors	Ateneo school colors	FEU school colors	NU school colors	La Salle school colors	UP school colors
UP	UE school colors	UST school colors	Ateneo school colors	FEU school colors	Adamson school colors	La Salle school colors	NU school colors	Ateneo school colors	La Salle school colors	Adamson school colors	UST school colors	NU school colors	FEU school colors	UE school colors
UST	La Salle school colors	UP school colors	Adamson school colors	Ateneo school colors	UE school colors	NU school colors	FEU school colors	NU school colors	UE school colors	FEU school colors	UP school colors	Adamson school colors	Ateneo school colors	La Salle school colors

= Win; = Loss

==== Results ====
Results to the right and top of the gray cells are first round games, those to the left and below are second round games.

Team	AdU	ADMU	DLSU	FEU	NU	UE	UP	UST
Adamson		2–3	0–3	2–3	0–3	3–1	3–2	0–3
Ateneo	2–3		0–3	0–3	1–3	3–0	3–0	0–3
La Salle	3–1	3–0		0–3	0–3	3–1	3–0	1–3
FEU	2–3	3–0	3–2		1–3	3–0	3–0	3–0
NU	1–3	3–0	3–2	1–3		3–1	3–0	3–1
UE	1–3	1–3	1–3	0–3	0–3		3–2	1–3
UP	1–3	3–2	0–3	2–3	0–3	3–2		3–1
UST	0–3	3–0	0–3	2–3	2–3	3–1	3–1	

Legend: Blue = left column team win; Red = top row team win.

=== Bracket ===
Semifinals (Nos. 1 & 2 have twice-to-beat advantage)
1	NU	3
4	Adamson	1
2	FEU	3
3	La Salle	0

Finals (Best-of-three series)
1	NU	3	1	3
2	FEU	2	3	1

=== Semifinals ===
==== NU vs. Adamson ====
Elimination round games:

- December 19: NU (3–0) Adamson at the Filoil Flying V Arena (26–24, 25–22, 25–19)
- January 23: NU (1–3) Adamson at the Filoil Flying V Arena (25–22, 20–25, 22–25, 27–29)

February 23; 08:00 AM (UTC+08:00)	NU Bulldogs	3–1	Adamson Soaring Falcons	Smart Araneta Coliseum, Quezon City; Attendance: 532; Referees: Lumer Pajarillo and Bob Malenab
February 23; 08:00 AM (UTC+08:00)	(25–22, 22–25, 25–19, 25–20)			Smart Araneta Coliseum, Quezon City; Attendance: 532; Referees: Lumer Pajarillo and Bob Malenab

==== FEU vs. La Salle ====
Elimination round games:

- December 12: FEU (3–0) La Salle at the Filoil Flying V Arena (25–23, 25–17, 26–24)
- January 20: FEU (3–2) La Salle at the Filoil Flying V Arena (22–25, 25–19, 25–21, 26–28, 15–13)

February 23; 09:30 AM (UTC+08:00)	FEU Tamaraws	3–0	De La Salle Green Archers	Smart Araneta Coliseum, Quezon City; Attendance: 683; Referees: Jasper Jimenez and Yul Benosa
February 23; 09:30 AM (UTC+08:00)	(25–23, 25–21, 25–13)			Smart Araneta Coliseum, Quezon City; Attendance: 683; Referees: Jasper Jimenez and Yul Benosa

=== Finals ===
Elimination round games:

- December 8: NU (3–1) FEU at the Filoil Flying V Arena (19–25, 25–18, 26–24, 25–18)
- February 17: NU (1–3) FEU at the Filoil Flying V Arena (20–25, 14–25, 30–28, 20–25)

March 2; 02:00 PM (UTC+08:00)	NU Bulldogs	3–2	FEU Tamaraws	Smart Araneta Coliseum, Quezon City; Attendance: 16,624; Referees: Jasper Jimenez and Dante Lopez
March 2; 02:00 PM (UTC+08:00)	(16–25, 18–25, 25–13, 25–17, 15–8)			Smart Araneta Coliseum, Quezon City; Attendance: 16,624; Referees: Jasper Jimenez and Dante Lopez

March 6; 02:00 PM (UTC+08:00)	NU Bulldogs	1–3	FEU Tamaraws	Mall of Asia Arena, Pasay
March 6; 02:00 PM (UTC+08:00)	(23–25, 25–17, 20–25, 23–25)			Mall of Asia Arena, Pasay

March 9; 02:00 PM (UTC+08:00)	NU Bulldogs	3–1	FEU Tamaraws	Filoil Flying V Arena, San Juan
March 9; 02:00 PM (UTC+08:00)	(26–24, 25–22, 23–25, 25–19)			Filoil Flying V Arena, San Juan

=== Awards ===
UAAP Season 75 men's volleyball champions
NU Bulldogs
First title

- Finals Most Valuable Player: Peter Den Mar Torres (National University)
- Season Most Valuable Player: Mark Gil Alfafara (University of Santo Tomas) and Red Christensen (De La Salle University)
- Rookie of the Year: Nikko Ramirez (Adamson University)
- Best scorer: Ron Jay Galang (Adamson University)
- Best attacker: Peter Den Mar Torres (National University)
- Best blocker: Mark Gil Alfafara (University of Santo Tomas)
- Best server: Arvin Avila (Far Eastern University)
- Best digger: Carlo Almario (University of the East)
- Best setter: Vince Mangulabnan (National University)
- Best receiver: Arvin Avila (Far Eastern University)

== Women's tournament ==
=== Elimination round ===
==== Team standings ====
Pos	Team	Pld	W	L	Pts	SW	SL	SR	SPW	SPL	SPR	Qualification
1	De La Salle Lady Archers	14	13	1	38	41	7	5.857	1149	832	1.381	Twice-to-beat in the semifinals
2	Ateneo Lady Eagles	14	10	4	29	34	18	1.889	1166	1030	1.132	Twice-to-beat in the semifinals
3	Adamson Lady Falcons	14	9	5	26	32	22	1.455	1175	1073	1.095	Twice-to-win in the semifinals
4	NU Lady Bulldogs (H)	14	8	6	27 (Note: Head-to-head record: NU 1–1 UST; fourth-seed playoff: NU 3–1 UST)	31	21	1.476	1170	1066	1.098	Twice-to-win in the semifinals
5	UST Growling Tigresses	14	8	6	22	27	25	1.080	1122	1136	0.988	Qualified to fourth-seed playoff
6	FEU Lady Tamaraws	14	6	8	20	23	25	0.920	1031	999	1.032	
7	UP Lady Maroons	14	2	12	4	7	40	0.175	769	1118	0.688	
8	UE Lady Warriors	14	0	14	2	5	42	0.119	801	1129	0.709	

Source: ABS-CBN Sports
Rules for classification: 1) number of wins; 2) if tied for #2 or #4, one-game playoff; 3) head-to-head record; 4) match points; 5) sets ratio; 6) points ratio
(H) Host

==== Match-up results ====
	Round 1							Round 2						
Team ╲ Game	1	2	3	4	5	6	7	8	9	10	11	12	13	14
AdU	NU school colors	La Salle school colors	UP school colors	FEU school colors	Ateneo school colors	UST school colors	UE school colors	Ateneo school colors	UE school colors	La Salle school colors	UST school colors	FEU school colors	NU school colors	UP school colors
ADMU	FEU school colors	UE school colors	UST school colors	NU school colors	UP school colors	Adamson school colors	La Salle school colors	Adamson school colors	FEU school colors	NU school colors	UP school colors	UE school colors	La Salle school colors	UST school colors
DLSU	UST school colors	Adamson school colors	FEU school colors	UE school colors	NU school colors	UP school colors	Ateneo school colors	NU school colors	UST school colors	Adamson school colors	FEU school colors	UP school colors	Ateneo school colors	UE school colors
FEU	Ateneo school colors	UP school colors	La Salle school colors	Adamson school colors	NU school colors	UE school colors	UST school colors	UE school colors	Ateneo school colors	UP school colors	La Salle school colors	Adamson school colors	UST school colors	NU school colors
NU	Adamson school colors	UST school colors	UE school colors	Ateneo school colors	La Salle school colors	FEU school colors	UP school colors	La Salle school colors	UP school colors	Ateneo school colors	UE school colors	UST school colors	Adamson school colors	FEU school colors
UE	UP school colors	Ateneo school colors	NU school colors	La Salle school colors	UST school colors	FEU school colors	Adamson school colors	FEU school colors	Adamson school colors	UST school colors	NU school colors	Ateneo school colors	UP school colors	La Salle school colors
UP	UE school colors	FEU school colors	Adamson school colors	UST school colors	Ateneo school colors	La Salle school colors	NU school colors	UST school colors	NU school colors	FEU school colors	Ateneo school colors	La Salle school colors	UE school colors	Adamson school colors
UST	La Salle school colors	NU school colors	Ateneo school colors	UP school colors	UE school colors	Adamson school colors	FEU school colors	UP school colors	La Salle school colors	UE school colors	Adamson school colors	NU school colors	FEU school colors	Ateneo school colors

= Win; = Loss

==== Results ====
Results to the right and top of the gray cells are first round games, those to the left and below are second round games.

Team	AdU	ADMU	DLSU	FEU	NU	UE	UP	UST
Adamson		1–3	0–3	3–0	3–2	3–0	3–0	2–3
Ateneo	2–3		2–3	3–2	3–2	3–0	3–0	3–0
La Salle	3–0	3–0		3–0	3–0	3–0	3–0	2–3
FEU	2–3	3–0	0–3		0–3	3–0	3–0	3–1
NU	3–1	0–3	2–3	3–0		3–1	3–0	3–1
UE	0–3	0–3	0–3	0–3	0–3		2–3	0–3
UP	0–3	0–3	0–3	0–3	0–3	3–2		0–3
UST	1–3	0–3	0–3	3–1	3–1	3–0	3–1	

Legend: Blue = left column team win; Red = top row team win.

=== Bracket ===
Fourth-seed playoff
NU	3
UST	1

Semifinals; Top seeds twice-to-beat
1	La Salle	3
4	NU	0
2	Ateneo	3
3	Adamson	0

Finals; Best-of-three series
1	La Salle	3	3
2	Ateneo	2	0

=== Fourth–seed playoff ===
UST and NU, which are tied at fourth place, played for the #4 seed, the last berth to the semifinal round of the playoffs.

Elimination round games:

- December 5: UST (1–3) NU at the Filoil Flying V Arena (16–25, 23–25, 25–23, 13–25)
- February 9: UST (3–1) NU at the SM Mall of Asia Arena (25–21, 25–21, 23–25, 25–17)

February 20; 02:00 PM (UTC+08:00)	UST Growling Tigresses	1–3	NU Lady Bulldogs	Filoil Flying V Arena, San Juan; Attendance: 1,053; Referees: Jess Villareal & Jasper Jimenez
February 20; 02:00 PM (UTC+08:00)	(19–25, 25–21, 16–25, 23–25)			Filoil Flying V Arena, San Juan; Attendance: 1,053; Referees: Jess Villareal & Jasper Jimenez

=== Semifinals ===
==== La Salle vs. NU ====
Elimination round games:

- December 19: La Salle (3–0) NU at the Filoil Flying V Arena (25–12, 25–17, 25–19)
- January 19: La Salle (3–2) NU at the Filoil Flying V Arena (25–20, 23–25, 24–26, 25–13, 15–8)

February 23; 02:00 PM (UTC+08:00)	De La Salle Lady Archers	3–0	NU Lady Bulldogs	Smart Araneta Coliseum, Quezon City; Attendance: 14,500; Referees: Bob Malenab and Jasper Jimenez
February 23; 02:00 PM (UTC+08:00)	(25–18, 25–23, 25–18)			Smart Araneta Coliseum, Quezon City; Attendance: 14,500; Referees: Bob Malenab and Jasper Jimenez

==== Ateneo vs. Adamson ====
Elimination round games:

- January 6: Ateneo (3–2) Adamson at the Filoil Flying V Arena (22–25, 25–23, 25–18, 23–25, 15–11)
- January 20: Ateneo (2–3) Adamson at the Filoil Flying V Arena (22–25, 21–25, 25–19, 25–16, 10–15)

February 23; 03:30 PM (UTC+08:00)	Ateneo Lady Eagles	3–0	Adamson Lady Falcons	Smart Araneta Coliseum, Quezon City; Attendance: 12,320; Referees: Yul Benosa and Lumer Pajarillo
February 23; 03:30 PM (UTC+08:00)	(25–23, 25–23, 26–24)			Smart Araneta Coliseum, Quezon City; Attendance: 12,320; Referees: Yul Benosa and Lumer Pajarillo

=== Finals ===
Elimination round games:

- January 12: La Salle (3–2) Ateneo at the Filoil Flying V Arena (26–28, 21–25, 25–13, 25–21, 15–13)
- February 9: La Salle (3–0) Ateneo at Mall of Asia Arena (25–19, 25–23, 25–21)

March 2; 04:00 PM (UTC+08:00)	De La Salle Lady Archers	3–2	Ateneo Lady Eagles	Smart Araneta Coliseum, Quezon City; Attendance: 17,342; Referees: Yul Benosa and Rodrigo Roxas
March 2; 04:00 PM (UTC+08:00)	(20–25, 17–25, 25–22, 25–22, 15–6)			Smart Araneta Coliseum, Quezon City; Attendance: 17,342; Referees: Yul Benosa and Rodrigo Roxas

March 6; 04:00 PM (UTC+08:00)	De La Salle Lady Archers	3–0	Ateneo Lady Eagles	Mall of Asia Arena, Pasay; Attendance: 18,779; Referees: Bob Malenab and Rodrigo Roxas
March 6; 04:00 PM (UTC+08:00)	(25–23, 25–20, 25–16)			Mall of Asia Arena, Pasay; Attendance: 18,779; Referees: Bob Malenab and Rodrigo Roxas

=== Awards ===
UAAP Season 75 women's volleyball champions
De La Salle Lady Archers
Eighth title, third consecutive title

- Finals Most Valuable Player: Michele Gumabao (De La Salle University)
- Season Most Valuable Players: Victonara Galang and Abigail Maraño (De La Salle University)
- Rookie of the Year: Aiko Urdas (National University)
- Best scorer: Alyssa Valdez (Ateneo de Manila University)
- Best setter: Jamenea Ferrer (Ateneo de Manila University)
- Best attacker: Myla Pablo (National University)
- Best digger: Jennylyn Reyes (National University)
- Best receiver: Jennylyn Reyes (National University)
- Best blocker: Abigail Maraño (De La Salle University)
- Best server: Bang Pineda (Adamson University)

== Boys' tournament ==
=== Elimination round ===
==== Team standings ====
Rank	Team	W	L	Pts
1	UE Junior Red Warriors	5	0	15
2	**NUNS Bullpups**	4	1	12
3	UST Tiger Cubs	2	3	6
4	Ateneo Blue Eaglets	2	3	6
5	Zobel Junior Archers	1	4	3
6	UPIS Junior Fighting Maroons	1	4	3

Host team in **boldface**.

Qualified to the semifinals with a twice-to-beat advantage
Qualified to the semifinals

==== Match-up results ====
	Round 1					Round 2				
Team ╲ Game	1	2	3	4	5	6	7	8	9	10
AdMU										
DLSU	UE school colors	UST school colors								
NU	UST school colors									
UE	La Salle school colors	UP school colors								
UP	UE school colors									
UST	NU school colors	La Salle school colors								

= Win; = Loss

==== Awards ====
UAAP Season 75 boys' volleyball champions
UE Junior Red Warriors
12th title, ninth consecutive title

- Most valuable player: Edward Camposano (University of the East)
- Rookie of the Year:
- Best attacker: Edward Camposano (University of the East)
- Best blocker: Edward Camposano (University of the East)
- Best setter: Evander Monsanto (University of the East)
- Best receiver: Lester Kim Sawal (University of the East)
- Best libero: Manuel Sumanguid III (National University)

== Girls' tournament ==
=== Elimination round ===
==== Team standings ====
Rank	Team	W	L	Pts
1	Zobel Junior Lady Archers	3	1	9
2	**NUNS Lady Bullpups**	3	1	9
3	UST Junior Tigresses	2	2	6
4	UE Junior Lady Warriors	1	3	3
5	UPIS Junior Lady Maroons	1	3	3

Host team in **boldface**.

Qualified to the semifinals with a twice-to-beat advantage
Qualified to the semifinals

==== Match-up results ====
	Round 1				Round 2			
Team ╲ Game	1	2	3	4	5	6	7	8
DLSU	UE school colors							
NU	UP school colors							
UE	La Salle school colors	UST school colors						
UP	UST school colors	NU school colors						
UST	UP school colors	UE school colors						

= Win; = Loss

==== Awards ====
UAAP Season 75 girls' volleyball champions
Zobel Junior Lady Archers
Ninth title, third consecutive title

- Most valuable player: Alessandra Isabel Narciso (De La Salle Zobel)
- Rookie of the Year: Ejiya Laure (University of Santo Tomas)
- Best attacker: Jaja Santiago (National University)
- Best blocker: Kim Kianna Dy (De La Salle Zobel)
- Best setter: Alessandra Isabel Narciso (De La Salle Zobel)
- Best receiver: Ennajie Laure (University of Santo Tomas)
- Best libero: Dawn Macandili (De La Salle Zobel)

== See also ==
- UAAP Season 75

Preceded by Season 74 (2011–12)	UAAP volleyball tournaments Season 75 (2012–13)	Succeeded by Season 76 (2013–14)
