= UAAP Season 74 volleyball tournaments =

Volleyball tournaments

UAAP Season 74 Volleyball
- Host school: Ateneo de Manila University
Men's Finals	G1	G2	Wins
FEU Tamaraws	3	3	2
UST Tiger Spikers	0	2	0
- Duration: February 25–29, 2012
- Arena(s): Filoil Flying V Arena, San Juan
- Finals MVP: Rodolfo Labrador
- Winning coach: George Pascua
- Semifinalists: Adamson Soaring Falcons; De La Salle Green Archers
- TV network(s): Studio 23, Balls
Women's Finals	G1	G2	G3	Wins
La Salle Lady Spikers	1	3	3	2+1
Ateneo Lady Eagles	3	1	0	1
- Duration: February 25–29, 2012
- Arena(s): Filoil Flying V Arena, San Juan
- Finals MVP: Charleen Abigail Cruz
- Winning coach: Ramil De Jesus
- Semifinalists: UST Growling Tigresses; FEU Lady Tamaraws
- TV network(s): Studio 23, Balls
Juniors' Finals	1	G2	Wins
UE Junior Red Warriors	3	–	1+1
UST Tiger Cubs	0	–	0
- Duration: February 5, 2012
- Arena(s): UE Caloocan Gym
- Winning coach: Rodrigo Roque
- Semifinalists: NU Bulldogs

UAAP Season 74 Girls' Volleyball
- Automatic champions: Elimination round record
DLSZ Junior Lady Archers	8–0 (1.000)
< Season 73	2011–12	Season 75 >

The seniors' division of the UAAP Season 74 volleyball tournaments opened November 26, 2011. Tournaments are hosted by Ateneo de Manila University. Tournament games are held at the Filoil Flying V Arena in San Juan City.

Usually held in the first semester, the UAAP Board decided to move the juniors' division tournaments on the second semester of the 2011–12 school year. In boys' tournament, the NU Bullpups and UST Tiger Cubs, which are tied at second place, played for the #2 seed with the latter winning the playoff. UE Junior Spikers successfully defended their title after beating UST in the finals. UE was awarded their tenth and eighth consecutive UAAP boys' volleyball championship. On the other hand, the La Salle Junior Lady Archers won all of their elimination round games in girls' division to clinch the championship outright.

In men's tournament, the FEU Tamaraws and the defending champions UST Tiger Spikers emerged on top of the standings and faced La Salle Green Spikers and Adamson Falcons in semifinals respectively. UST beat Adamson in four sets in semifinals to formalize their entry to the Finals. La Salle forced a rubber match but FEU won in a thrilling four-set battle on the second game to face third consecutive Finals rematch with UST.

In women's tournament, the La Salle Lady Spikers had the distinction of sweeping the double round eliminations 14–0, capped by a win against Ateneo Lady Spikers (3–2) on their last elimination round game. The UST Tigresses snagged the solo third spot into the Final Four after beating Adamson Lady Falcons in straight sets on their last game of eliminations. With La Salle sweeping the elimination round, the playoff tournament went through the stepladder format. Being tied at fourth place, FEU Lady Tamaraws blanked Adamson on a play for the #4 seed, the last berth to the first round of the playoffs. UST defeated FEU in a playoff, but Ateneo, enjoying twice-to-beat advantage, marched to their first UAAP Finals appearance with a win over the Tigresses.

== Men's tournament ==
=== Elimination round ===
==== Team standings ====
Pos	Team	Pld	W	L	Pts	SW	SL	SR	SPW	SPL	SPR	Qualification
1	FEU Tamaraws	14	12	2	26	40	18	2.222	1338	1162	1.151	Twice-to-beat in the semifinals
2	UST Growling Tigers	14	11	3	25	36	17	2.118	1224	1089	1.124	Twice-to-beat in the semifinals
3	Adamson Soaring Falcons	14	9	5	23 (Note: Sets ratio: Adamson 1.750, La Salle 1.632)	35	20	1.750	1245	1127	1.105	Twice-to-win in the semifinals
4	De La Salle Green Archers	14	9	5	23	31	19	1.632	1149	1068	1.076	Twice-to-win in the semifinals
5	NU Bulldogs	14	7	7	21	30	24	1.250	1213	1172	1.035	
6	UP Fighting Maroons	14	6	8	20	24	33	0.727	1220	1324	0.921	
7	Ateneo Blue Eagles	14	2	12	16	9	38	0.237	892	1113	0.801	
8	UE Red Warriors	14	0	14	14	6	42	0.143	950	1185	0.802	

Source: ABS-CBN Sports
Rules for classification: 1) number of wins; 2) if tied for #2 or #4, one-game playoff; 3) match points; 4) sets ratio; 5) points ratio

==== Schedule ====
	Round 1							Round 2						
Team ╲ Game	1	2	3	4	5	6	7	8	9	10	11	12	13	14
AdU	NU school colors	UE school colors	UST school colors	La Salle school colors	FEU school colors	UP school colors	Ateneo school colors	NU school colors	UE school colors	UST school colors	La Salle school colors	Ateneo school colors	UP school colors	FEU school colors
ADMU	UE school colors	NU school colors	FEU school colors	UST school colors	UP school colors	La Salle school colors	Adamson school colors	La Salle school colors	FEU school colors	UP school colors	NU school colors	Adamson school colors	UST school colors	UE school colors
DLSU	FEU school colors	UE school colors	UST school colors	Adamson school colors	NU school colors	Ateneo school colors	UP school colors	Ateneo school colors	UE school colors	UST school colors	Adamson school colors	FEU school colors	NU school colors	UP school colors
FEU	La Salle school colors	UP school colors	Ateneo school colors	NU school colors	UE school colors	Adamson school colors	UST school colors	UST school colors	Ateneo school colors	NU school colors	UE school colors	La Salle school colors	UP school colors	Adamson school colors
NU	Adamson school colors	UP school colors	Ateneo school colors	FEU school colors	UST school colors	La Salle school colors	UE school colors	Adamson school colors	FEU school colors	UP school colors	Ateneo school colors	UE school colors	La Salle school colors	UST school colors
UE	Ateneo school colors	La Salle school colors	Adamson school colors	UP school colors	FEU school colors	UST school colors	NU school colors	UP school colors	Adamson school colors	La Salle school colors	FEU school colors	NU school colors	UST school colors	Ateneo school colors
UP	UST school colors	NU school colors	FEU school colors	UE school colors	Ateneo school colors	Adamson school colors	La Salle school colors	UE school colors	Ateneo school colors	NU school colors	UST school colors	FEU school colors	Adamson school colors	La Salle school colors
UST	UP school colors	La Salle school colors	Adamson school colors	Ateneo school colors	NU school colors	UE school colors	FEU school colors	FEU school colors	Adamson school colors	La Salle school colors	UP school colors	UE school colors	Ateneo school colors	NU school colors

= Win; = Loss

==== Results ====
Results to the right and top of the black cells are first round games, those to the left and below are second round games.

Team	AdU	ADMU	DLSU	FEU	NU	UE	UP	UST
Adamson		3–0	1–3	3–2	2–3	3–0	3–0	2–3
Ateneo	0–3		1–3	0–3	0–3	3–0	1–3	0–3
La Salle	3–1	3–0		1–3	0–3	3–0	3–0	0–3
FEU	3–2	3–0	3–2		3–2	3–1	3–0	2–3
NU	1–3	3–0	1–3	1–3		3–0	3–1	2–3
UE	0–3	2–3	1–3	0–3	0–3		1–3	0–3
UP	2–3	3–2	0–3	2–3	3–2	3–1		3–2
UST	0–3	3–0	3–1	1–3	3–0	0–3	3–1	

Legend: Blue = left column team win; Red = top row team win.

=== Bracket ===
Semifinals (Nos. 1 & 2 have twice-to-beat advantage)
1	FEU	1	3
4	La Salle	3	1
2	UST	3
3	Adamson	1

Finals (Best-of-three series)
1	FEU	3	3
2	UST	0	2

=== Semifinals ===
==== FEU vs. La Salle ====
Elimination round games:

- November 26: FEU (3–1) La Salle at the Filoil Flying V Arena (25–16, 17–25, 25–23, 25–16)
- February 1: FEU (3–2) La Salle at the Filoil Flying V Arena (20–25, 25–20, 20–25, 25–19, 15–11)

February 15; 10:00 AM (UTC+08:00)	FEU Tamaraws	1–3	De La Salle Green Archers	Filoil Flying V Arena, San Juan; Attendance: 241; Referees: Efren Gaa and Philip Sison
February 15; 10:00 AM (UTC+08:00)	(18–25, 25–14, 23–25, 20–25); Report			Filoil Flying V Arena, San Juan; Attendance: 241; Referees: Efren Gaa and Philip Sison

February 22; 10:00 AM (UTC+08:00)	FEU Tamaraws	3–1	De La Salle Green Archers	Filoil Flying V Arena, San Juan; Attendance: 872; Referees: Lumer Pajarillo and Efren Gaa
February 22; 10:00 AM (UTC+08:00)	(23–25, 25–19, 25–20, 26–24); Report			Filoil Flying V Arena, San Juan; Attendance: 872; Referees: Lumer Pajarillo and Efren Gaa

==== UST vs. Adamson ====
Elimination round games:

- December 7: UST (3–2) Adamson at the Filoil Flying V Arena (25–21, 20–25, 22–25, 25–21, 15–9)
- January 21: UST (0–3) Adamson at the Filoil Flying V Arena (18–25, 23–25, 20–25)

February 18; 10:00 AM (UTC+08:00)	UST Tiger Spikers	3–1	Adamson Soaring Falcons	Filoil Flying V Arena, San Juan; Attendance: 422; Referees: Philip Sison and Adrian Tabañag
February 18; 10:00 AM (UTC+08:00)	(20–25, 25–18, 25–22, 25–12); Report			Filoil Flying V Arena, San Juan; Attendance: 422; Referees: Philip Sison and Adrian Tabañag

=== Finals ===
Elimination round games:

- January 8: FEU (2–3) UST at the Filoil Flying V Arena (25–14, 26–24, 21–25, 21–25, 11–15)
- January 14: FEU (3–1) UST at the Filoil Flying V Arena (25–19, 23–25, 25–22, 25–17)

February 25; 10:00 AM (UTC+08:00)	FEU Tamaraws	3–0	UST Tiger Spikers	Filoil Flying V Arena, San Juan; Attendance: 1,051; Referees: Philip Sison and Adrian Tabañag
February 25; 10:00 AM (UTC+08:00)	(25–20, 25–21, 25–22); Report			Filoil Flying V Arena, San Juan; Attendance: 1,051; Referees: Philip Sison and Adrian Tabañag

February 29; 10:00 AM (UTC+08:00)	FEU Tamaraws	3–2	UST Tiger Spikers	Filoil Flying V Arena, San Juan
February 29; 10:00 AM (UTC+08:00)	(25–27, 25–15, 19–25, 25–21, 15–13)			Filoil Flying V Arena, San Juan

=== Awards ===
UAAP Season 74 men's volleyball champions
FEU Tamaraws
25th title

The UAAP awarded the outstanding players of the season prior to Game 1 of the Finals of men's volleyball at Filoil Flying V Arena in San Juan.

- Most valuable player (Season): Jayson Ramos, University of Santo Tomas
- Most valuable player (Finals): Rodolfo Labrador, Jr., Far Eastern University
- Best scorer: Rodolfo Labrador, Jr., Far Eastern University
- Best attacker: Peter Den Mar Torres, National University
- Best blocker: Ruben Inaudito, National University
- Best setter: Pitrus Paolo de Ocampo, Far Eastern University
- Best server: John Hendrix Competente, Adamson University
- Best receiver: Paul Jan Doloiras, University of Santo Tomas
- Best digger: Gilbert Longavela, Adamson University

== Women's tournament ==
=== Elimination round ===
With La Salle's 14–0 sweep of the tournament, they were supposed to proceed to the usual Final Four playoffs but instead will go through the stepladder format after UAAP Board upheld La Salle's appeal.

==== Team standings ====
Pos	Team	Pld	W	L	Pts	SW	SL	SR	SPW	SPL	SPR	Qualification
1	De La Salle Lady Archers	14	14	0	28	42	8	5.250	1177	918	1.282	Advance to the Finals
2	Ateneo Lady Eagles	14	11	3	25	37	16	2.313	1214	1025	1.184	Twice-to-beat in stepladder round 2
3	UST Growling Tigresses	14	9	5	23	32	19	1.684	1160	1022	1.135	Stepladder round 1
4	FEU Lady Tamaraws	14	8	6	22 (Note: Head-to-head record: FEU 1–1 Adamson; fourth-seed playoff: FEU 3–0 Adamson)	32	19	1.684	1144	1075	1.064	Stepladder round 1
5	Adamson Lady Falcons	14	8	6	22	28	23	1.217	1135	1052	1.079	Qualified to fourth-seed playoff
6	UE Lady Warriors	14	4	10	18	12	35	0.343	910	1081	0.842	
7	NU Lady Bulldogs	14	2	12	16	13	37	0.351	911	1137	0.801	
8	UP Lady Maroons	14	0	14	14	3	42	0.071	767	1108	0.692	

Source: ABS-CBN Sports
Rules for classification: 1) number of wins; 2) if tied for #2 or #4, one-game playoff; 3) match points; 4) sets ratio; 5) points ratio

==== Schedule ====
	Round 1							Round 2						
Team ╲ Game	1	2	3	4	5	6	7	8	9	10	11	12	13	14
AdU	La Salle school colors	UP school colors	UST school colors	UE school colors	FEU school colors	NU school colors	Ateneo school colors	La Salle school colors	NU school colors	UP school colors	Ateneo school colors	FEU school colors	UE school colors	UST school colors
ADMU	UST school colors	UE school colors	La Salle school colors	NU school colors	UP school colors	FEU school colors	Adamson school colors	UST school colors	NU school colors	UE school colors	Adamson school colors	FEU school colors	UP school colors	La Salle school colors
DLSU	Adamson school colors	Ateneo school colors	NU school colors	FEU school colors	UP school colors	UE school colors	UST school colors	Adamson school colors	FEU school colors	UE school colors	UST school colors	UP school colors	NU school colors	Ateneo school colors
FEU	UE school colors	UP school colors	UST school colors	La Salle school colors	Adamson school colors	Ateneo school colors	NU school colors	NU school colors	La Salle school colors	UST school colors	UP school colors	Adamson school colors	Ateneo school colors	UE school colors
NU	UP school colors	UE school colors	La Salle school colors	Ateneo school colors	UST school colors	Adamson school colors	FEU school colors	FEU school colors	Adamson school colors	Ateneo school colors	UE school colors	UST school colors	La Salle school colors	UP school colors
UE	FEU school colors	Ateneo school colors	NU school colors	Adamson school colors	UST school colors	La Salle school colors	UP school colors	UP school colors	La Salle school colors	Ateneo school colors	NU school colors	UST school colors	Adamson school colors	FEU school colors
UP	NU school colors	Adamson school colors	FEU school colors	UST school colors	La Salle school colors	Ateneo school colors	UE school colors	UE school colors	Adamson school colors	UST school colors	FEU school colors	La Salle school colors	Ateneo school colors	NU school colors
UST	Ateneo school colors	Adamson school colors	FEU school colors	UP school colors	UE school colors	NU school colors	La Salle school colors	Ateneo school colors	FEU school colors	UP school colors	La Salle school colors	UE school colors	NU school colors	Adamson school colors

= Win; = Loss

==== Results ====
Results to the right and top of the black cells are first round games, those to the left and below are second round games.

Team	AdU	ADMU	DLSU	FEU	NU	UE	UP	UST
Adamson		2–3	1–3	0–3	3–2	3–0	3–0	3–2
Ateneo	3–1		1–3	3–1	3–0	3–0	3–0	3–0
La Salle	3–0	3–2		3–2	3–0	3–0	3–0	3–2
FEU	1–3	2–3	0–3		3–0	3–0	3–0	2–3
NU	0–3	1–3	0–3	0–3		2–3	3–0	0–3
UE	0–3	0–3	0–3	0–3	3–2		3–1	0–3
UP	0–3	0–3	0–3	0–3	1–3	0–3		1–3
UST	3–0	3–1	0–3	1–3	3–0	3–0	3–0	

Legend: Blue = left column team win; Red = top row team win.

=== Bracket ===
4th–seed playoff (One–game playoff)
4	Adamson	0
5	FEU	3

First round (One–game playoff)
3	UST	3
4	FEU	1

Semifinals (No. 2 seed has twice-to-beat advantage)
2	Ateneo	3
3	UST	1

Finals (#1 seed has 1–0 lead in a best-of-5 series)
1	La Salle	1	3	3
2	Ateneo	3	1	0

=== Fourth–seed playoff ===
Adamson and FEU, which are tied at fourth place, played for the #4 seed, the last berth to the first round of the playoffs.

Elimination round games:

- December 17: Adamson (0–3) FEU at the Filoil Flying V Arena (22–25, 23–25, 17–25)
- February 1: Adamson (3–1) FEU at the Filoil Flying V Arena (25–18, 25–18, 21–25, 25–19)

February 13; 03:30 PM (UTC+08:00)	Adamson Lady Falcons	0–3	FEU Lady Tamaraws	Filoil Flying V Arena, San Juan; Attendance: 352; Referees: Lumer Pajarillo and Efren Gaa
February 13; 03:30 PM (UTC+08:00)	(19–25, 17–25, 24–26); Report			Filoil Flying V Arena, San Juan; Attendance: 352; Referees: Lumer Pajarillo and Efren Gaa

=== First round ===
Elimination round games:

- December 7: UST (3–2) FEU at the Filoil Flying V Arena (25–19, 21–25, 22–25, 25–16, 15–13)
- January 22: UST (1–3) FEU at the Filoil Flying V Arena (25–23, 20–25, 23–25, 23–25)

February 15; 02:00 PM (UTC+08:00)	UST Growling Tigresses	3–1	FEU Lady Tamaraws	Filoil Flying V Arena, San Juan; Attendance: 841; Referees: Lumer Pajarillo and Jess Villareal
February 15; 02:00 PM (UTC+08:00)	(25–22, 23–25, 25–17, 25–21); Report			Filoil Flying V Arena, San Juan; Attendance: 841; Referees: Lumer Pajarillo and Jess Villareal

=== Semifinal ===
Elimination round games:

- November 27: Ateneo (3–0) UST at the Filoil Flying V Arena (25–16, 25–23, 25–18)
- January 15: Ateneo (1–3) UST at the Filoil Flying V Arena (25–14, 21–25, 19–25, 23–25)

February 18; 02:00 PM (UTC+08:00)	Ateneo Lady Eagles	3–1	UST Growling Tigresses	Filoil Flying V Arena, San Juan; Attendance: 1,916; Referees: Lumer Pajarillo and Philip Sison
February 18; 02:00 PM (UTC+08:00)	(25–19, 25–16, 22–25, 25–19); Report			Filoil Flying V Arena, San Juan; Attendance: 1,916; Referees: Lumer Pajarillo and Philip Sison

=== Finals ===
Elimination round games:

- December 3: La Salle (3–1) Ateneo at the Filoil Flying V Arena (21–25, 25–22, 25–18, 25–21)
- February 12: La Salle (3–2) Ateneo at the Filoil Flying V Arena (18–25, 25–14, 21–25, 25–19, 15–7)

La Salle has the thrice-to-beat advantage after sweeping the elimination round.

February 22; 02:00 PM (UTC+08:00)	De La Salle Lady Archers	1–3	Ateneo Lady Eagles	Filoil Flying V Arena, San Juan; Attendance: 3,002; Referees: Philip Sison and Rodrigo Rojas
February 22; 02:00 PM (UTC+08:00)	(25–23, 26–28, 23–25, 17–25); Report			Filoil Flying V Arena, San Juan; Attendance: 3,002; Referees: Philip Sison and Rodrigo Rojas

February 25; 02:00 PM (UTC+08:00)	De La Salle Lady Archers	3–1	Ateneo Lady Eagles	Filoil Flying V Arena, San Juan; Attendance: 7,039; Referees: Efren Gaa and Philip Sison
February 25; 02:00 PM (UTC+08:00)	(23–25, 25–21, 26–24, 25–18); Report			Filoil Flying V Arena, San Juan; Attendance: 7,039; Referees: Efren Gaa and Philip Sison

February 29; 02:00 PM (UTC+08:00)	De La Salle Lady Archers	3–0	Ateneo Lady Eagles	Filoil Flying V Arena, San Juan
February 29; 02:00 PM (UTC+08:00)	(25–16, 25–22, 25–13)			Filoil Flying V Arena, San Juan

=== Awards ===
UAAP Season 74 women's volleyball champions
De La Salle Lady Archers
Seventh title, second consecutive title

The UAAP awarded the outstanding players of the season prior to Game 2 of the Finals of women's volleyball at Filoil Flying V Arena in San Juan.

- Most valuable player (Season): Abigail Maraño, De La Salle University
- Most valuable player (Finals): Charleen Abigail Cruz, De La Salle University
- Rookie of the Year: Victonara Galang, De La Salle University
- Best scorer: Rosemarie Vargas, Far Eastern University
- Best attacker: Maika Angela Ortiz, University of Santo Tomas
- Best blocker: Michele Gumabao, De La Salle University
- Best setter: Gyzelle Sy, Far Eastern University
- Best server: Victonara Galang, De La Salle University
- Best receiver: Angelica Vasquez, Adamson University
- Best digger: Christine Agno, Far Eastern University

== Boys' tournament ==
=== Elimination round ===
==== Team standings ====
Team	W	L	PCT	GB
UE Junior Red Warriors	7	0	1.000	—
UST Tiger Cubs	5	2	.714	2
NUNS Bullpups	5	2	.714	2
Ateneo Blue Eaglets	3	4	.429	4
Zobel Junior Archers	1	6	.143	6
UPIS Junior Fighting Maroons	0	7	.000	7

- Qualified to the finals with the twice to beat advantage
- Qualified to the finals
- Qualified to the second-seed playoff

=== Bracket ===
Second-seed playoff			Finals #1 has a 1–0 lead in a best-of-3 series
			1	UE	3
2	NU	0	2	UST	0
3	UST	3

=== Awards ===
UAAP Season 74 boys' volleyball champions
UE Junior Red Warriors
Tenth title, eighth consecutive title

- Most valuable player: Edward Camposano, University of the East
- Rookie of the Year: Christian Gopio, University of the East
- Best attacker: Edward Camposano, University of the East
- Best receiver: Karl Roque, University of the East
- Best blocker: Edward Camposano, University of the East
- Best server: Wesley Fabroa, University of Santo Tomas
- Best setter: Geuel Asia, University of the East
- Best libero: Manuel Sumanguid III, National University

== Girls' tournament ==
With De La Salle sweeping the elimination round, they were declared automatic champions and the playoffs were scrapped.

=== Elimination round ===
==== Team standings ====
Rank	Team	W	L	PCT	GB
1st place, gold medalist(s)	La Salle Junior Lady Archers	6	0	1.000	—
2nd place, silver medalist(s)	UE Junior Amazons	5	1	.833	1
3rd place, bronze medalist(s)	UST Lady Tiger Cubs	3	3	.500	3
4	UPIS Junior Lady Maroons	1	5	.167	5
5	NU Lady Bullpups	0	6	.000	6

- Qualified to the Finals with the twice-to-beat advantage
- Qualified to the Finals

=== Awards ===
UAAP Season 74 girls' volleyball champions
Zobel Junior Lady Archers
Eighth title, second consecutive title

- Most valuable player: Julienne Calugcug, De La Salle University
- Rookie of the Year: Christine Mhae Tolentino, University of the East
- Best attacker:
- Best blocker: Kim Kianna Dy, De La Salle University
- Best server: Ennajie Laure, University of Santo Tomas
- Best receiver:
- Best setter: Nina Baltazar, University of the East
- Best libero: Dawn Macandili, De La Salle University

Preceded by Season 73 (2010–11)	UAAP volleyball tournaments Season 74 (2011–12)	Succeeded by Season 75 (2012–13)
