= UAAP Season 73 volleyball tournaments =

Volleyball tournaments

UAAP Season 73 Volleyball
- Host school: De La Salle University
Men's Finals	G1	G2	Wins
UST Growling Tigers	3	3	2
FEU Tamaraws	1	0	0
- Duration: February 23–26, 2011
- Arena(s): Filoil Flying V Arena, San Juan
- Finals MVP: Jayson Ramos
- Winning coach: Emil Lontoc
- Semifinalists: UP Fighting Maroons; De La Salle Green Archers
- TV network(s): Studio 23
Women's Finals	1	2	Wins
De La Salle Lady Archers	3	3	2
UST Growling Tigresses	2	0	0
- Duration: February 23–26, 2011
- Arena(s): Filoil Flying V Arena, San Juan
- Finals MVP: Charleen Abigail Cruz
- Winning coach: Ramil de Jesus
- Semifinalists: Adamson Lady Falcons; Ateneo Lady Eagles
- TV network(s): Studio 23

UAAP Season 73 Juniors' Volleyball
- Automatic champions: Elimination round record
UE Junior Red Warriors	10–0 (1.000)
DLSZ Junior Lady Archers	6–0 (1.000)
< Season 72	2010–11	Season 74 >

The seniors' division of the UAAP Season 73 volleyball tournaments opened November 27, 2010. Tournaments are hosted by De La Salle University. Tournament games are held at the Filoil Flying V Arena in San Juan City.

The juniors' division tournaments were held on the first semester of the 2010–11 school year; the UE Pages and the De La Salle Junior Lady Archers won all of their elimination round games in their respective divisions to clinch the championship outright.

== Men's tournament ==
=== Season's team line-up ===
Legend
S	Setter
MH	Middle hitter
OH	Open hitter
U	Utility
L	Libero
(c)	Team captain

ADAMSON FALCONS
No.	Player name	Position
1	PAGTALUNAN, April John	
2	MALLAPRE, John Edison	
3	JARDIN, Rodolfo Christopher	
4	GALANG, Ron Jay	
5	LAGCO, Alvin Joseph	
6	LONGAVELA, Gilbert	L
7	RESSURECCION, Marvin Dan	
8	COMPETENTE, John Hendrix (c)	
9	JERUZ, Niño	
10	EXCONDE, Mark Christian	
11	MALEON, Amando Jr.	
12	ARANTE, Kenneth	
13	BERANGO, Joshua	
14	JAMORALIN, Paolo	

ATENEO BLUE EAGLES
No.	Player name	Position
1	FLORES, Neil Patrick	
2	TEVES, Duane Craig	
4	AFRICA, Julbong	
5	GONZALES, Ricol	
7	SANDOVAL, John Joseph	
8	CAANCAN, Walter Jr.	
10	URBANO, Takeshi	
11	INTAL, Narciso Jr.	
12	SERRANILLA, Vian Paul	L
13	PAREJA, John Paul	
15	LIM, Jerric	
16	DE JOYA, Joseph Michael	
17	RIVERA, Bartolome III	
18	ORTEGA, Eduardo (c)	

DLSU GREEN ARCHERS
No.	Player name	Position
1	MACASAET, Chris (c)	MH
2	LUBI, Samuel	S
3	CHRISTENSEN, Red	
4	ANTONIO, Christopher	U
5	SANTOH, Brendon Joseph	
6	CASANOVA, Bernardino II	L
7	LEE, Emilio	OH
8	MANALO, Alan Dexter	
9	CALDERON, Aaron	
10	CERVEZA, Philip Ellison	
11	RIVERA, Carlo	MH
12	DE LA VEGA, John Kevin	OH
13	BARTOLOME, Aljun Vincent	
14	EGUIA, Innah Maria	

FEU TAMARAWS
No.	Player name	Position
1	PABALAN, Adrian	
2	DEL ROHARIO, Rodrigo Jr.	
3	MOLATE, Nestor	OH
4	GARCIA, Ferdinand	
5	GABRIEL, Maverick	L
6	DELA CALZADA, Karl Ian	U
7	LABRADOR, Rodolfo Jr. (c)	MH
8	AVILA, Arvin	OH
9	TONQUIN, Roland	MH
10	DEPAMAYLO, John Ian	U
11	BRIOHO, Bryan James	L
12	FAYTAREN, Alexis	
14	DEOCAMPO, Pitrus Paulo	S
15	BELIRAN, Kirk	

NU BULLDOGS
No.	Player name	Position
2	PASTORFIDE, Ronald	
3	DIGAL, Rishnan Jed	
4	TORRES, Peter Den Mar	
5	MEDRANO, Leonardo Jr.	
6	TIPAY, Josephenry	
7	PADUA, John Paul	
8	BALOALOA, Ariel Kenneth	
9	INAUDITO, Rueben (c)	
10	INFANTE, Erwin	L
11	TOLENTINO, Edwin	
12	MOLINA, Julian	
14	SANTIAGO, Maurice Jay	
16	RAMOHA, Danilo Jr.	
17	SEBASTIAN, Janrex	

UE WARRIORS
No.	Player name	Position
1	PRADEL, Ralph Carlo	
2	QUINTO, Richard Roi	
3	EUGENIO, Jerome Cyril	
4	ACOT, Amenolah	L
5	ACAYA, Ramon	
6	CRUZ, Kim Dwight	
7	SORIA, Angelone	
8	PEDRANO, Benchard	
9	MANDANI, Ace	
10	PADILLA, Alvin (c)	
11	LAURESTA, Homer	
12	DEAN, John Kristian	
13	SUBIAGA, Jay Kim	
14	GARCIA, Morissey Claude	

UP FIGHTING MAROONS
No.	Player name	Position
1	LUCINDO, Dominico Ramon	OH
2	LANSANGAN, Jeffrey	OH
3	APOSTOL, Luis Miguel	L
4	PAQUIZ, Samuel Stephen	OH
5	AGUILAN, Luis Antonio Severino	MH
6	RICAFORT, Rald Benson	U
8	ASPERAS, Alexandro Marco	U
9	SAGAD, Mark Justin	U
10	PAMINTUAN, Johnal Rey	OH
11	SANTOS, Jose	S
12	MAGTOTO, Gerald	S
15	BELGADO, Lloyd Arden	MH
16	WONG, Julius Paul	MH
18	ARDA, Michael Jordan (c)	OH

UST TIGERS
No.	Player name	Position
1	SIOSON, Julius Anthony	OH/U
2	ILANO, Harby	MH
3	DEPANTE, Salvador Juan III	OH
4	PECAÑA, Henry James (c)	U
5	RAMOS, Jayson	MH
6	ARBASTO, Christian Anthony	MH
7	DOLOIRAS, Paul Jan	L
8	UCANG, Kerr Sherwyn	S
9	SUBIERE, John David	
10	TORRES, John Paul	OH
11	REJUSO, Christopher	MH
14	ROMERO, Paul John	S
17	ALFAFARA, Mark Gil	
18	RICO, Romnick	

=== Elimination round ===
==== Team standings ====
Pos	Team	Pld	W	L	Pts	SW	SL	SR	SPW	SPL	SPR	Qualification
1	UST Growling Tigers	14	13	1	27	41	7	5.857	1178	896	1.315	Twice-to-beat in the semifinals
2	FEU Tamaraws	14	13	1	27	40	10	4.000	1196	1005	1.190	Twice-to-beat in the semifinals
3	UP Fighting Maroons	14	8	6	22	30	21	1.429	1157	1091	1.060	Twice-to-win in the semifinals
4	De La Salle Green Archers (H)	14	8	6	22	29	22	1.318	1143	1085	1.053	Twice-to-win in the semifinals
5	Adamson Soaring Falcons	14	6	8	20	22	26	0.846	1051	1077	0.976	
6	Ateneo Blue Eagles	14	4	10	18	16	33	0.485	998	1114	0.896	
7	NU Bulldogs	14	3	11	17	15	38	0.395	1085	1244	0.872	
8	UE Red Warriors	14	1	13	15	5	41	0.122	831	1127	0.737	

(H) Host

==== Schedule ====
School	Round 1							Round 2						
School	1	2	3	4	5	6	7	8	9	10	11	12	13	14
AdU	UE school colors	Ateneo school colors	La Salle school colors	UP school colors	NU school colors	UST school colors	FEU school colors	NU school colors	UST school colors	UP school colors	FEU school colors	La Salle school colors	UE school colors	Ateneo school colors
Ateneo	UST school colors	NU school colors	Adamson school colors	FEU school colors	UP school colors	UE school colors	La Salle school colors	UE school colors	FEU school colors	La Salle school colors	UST school colors	UP school colors	NU school colors	Adamson school colors
La Salle	NU school colors	UP school colors	Adamson school colors	UST school colors	FEU school colors	Ateneo school colors	UE school colors	FEU school colors	UE school colors	Ateneo school colors	NU school colors	Adamson school colors	UST school colors	UP school colors
FEU	UP school colors	UE school colors	NU school colors	Ateneo school colors	La Salle school colors	Adamson school colors	UST school colors	La Salle school colors	Ateneo school colors	UE school colors	Adamson school colors	UP school colors	NU school colors	UST school colors
NU	La Salle school colors	Ateneo school colors	FEU school colors	UE school colors	Adamson school colors	UP school colors	UST school colors	Adamson school colors	UP school colors	UST school colors	La Salle school colors	Ateneo school colors	FEU school colors	UE school colors
UE	Adamson school colors	FEU school colors	UST school colors	NU school colors	Ateneo school colors	UP school colors	La Salle school colors	Ateneo school colors	La Salle school colors	FEU school colors	UP school colors	Adamson school colors	UST school colors	NU school colors
UP	FEU school colors	La Salle school colors	UST school colors	Adamson school colors	Ateneo school colors	NU school colors	UE school colors	UST school colors	NU school colors	Adamson school colors	UE school colors	Ateneo school colors	FEU school colors	La Salle school colors
UST	Ateneo school colors	UE school colors	UP school colors	La Salle school colors	Adamson school colors	NU school colors	FEU school colors	UP school colors	Adamson school colors	NU school colors	Ateneo school colors	La Salle school colors	UE school colors	FEU school colors

Win
Loss

==== Results ====
Results to the right and top of the black cells are first round games, those to the left and below are second round games.

Team	AdU	ADMU	DLSU	FEU	NU	UE	UP	UST
Adamson		1–3	1–3	0–3	3–0	3–0	1–3	0–3
Ateneo	0–3		0–3	0–3	2–3	3–0	0–3	0–3
La Salle	3–0	3–1		0–3	3–0	3–0	3–2	0–3
FEU	3–0	3–0	3–1		3–1	3–0	3–1	3–2
NU	1–3	2–3	3–2	0–3		2–3	0–3	0–3
UE	0–3	0–3	0–3	0–3	1–3		0–3	1–3
UP	1–3	3–1	3–1	2–3	3–0	3–0		0–3
UST	3–1	3–0	3–1	3–1	3–0	3–0	3–0	

Win
Loss

=== Bracket ===
Semifinals (Nos. 1 & 2 have twice-to-beat advantage)
1	UST	3
4	La Salle	2
2	FEU	3
3	UP	0

Finals (Best-of-three series)
1	UST	3	3
2	FEU	1	0

=== Semifinals ===
==== FEU vs. UP ====
February 16; 2:00 PM	FEU Tamaraws	3–0	UP Fighting Maroons	Filoil Flying V Arena, San Juan; Attendance: 896; Referees: Yul Benosa and Romulo Reforsado
February 16; 2:00 PM	(25–16, 25–22, 25–20)			Filoil Flying V Arena, San Juan; Attendance: 896; Referees: Yul Benosa and Romulo Reforsado

==== UST vs. La Salle ====
February 19; 2:00 PM	UST Growling Tigers	3–2	De La Salle Green Archers	Filoil Flying V Arena, San Juan; Attendance: 1,984; Referees: Bob Malenab and Rodrigo Rojas
February 19; 2:00 PM	(23–25, 20–25, 25–16, 25–16, 15–8); Report			Filoil Flying V Arena, San Juan; Attendance: 1,984; Referees: Bob Malenab and Rodrigo Rojas

=== Finals ===
February 23; 1:00 PM	UST Growling Tigers	3–1	FEU Tamaraws	Filoil Flying V Arena, San Juan; Attendance: 3,462; Referees: Romulo Reforsado and Pedrito Bermas
February 23; 1:00 PM	(20–25, 25–23, 25–23, 25–23)			Filoil Flying V Arena, San Juan; Attendance: 3,462; Referees: Romulo Reforsado and Pedrito Bermas

February 26; 2:00 PM	UST Growling Tigers	3–0	FEU Tamaraws	Filoil Flying V Arena, San Juan; Attendance: 5,400; Referees: Rodrigo Rojas and Romulo Reforsado
February 26; 2:00 PM	(29–27, 26–24, 25–23)			Filoil Flying V Arena, San Juan; Attendance: 5,400; Referees: Rodrigo Rojas and Romulo Reforsado

=== Awards ===
UAAP Season 73 men's volleyball champions
UST Growling Tigers
18th title, fourth consecutive title

- Finals Most Valuable Player: Jayson Ramos (University of Santo Tomas)
- Season Most Valuable Player: John Paul Torres (University of Santo Tomas)
- Rookie of the Year: Peter Den Mar Torres (National University)
- Best attacker: John Paul Torres (University of Santo Tomas)
- Best blocker: Niño Jeruz (Adamson University)
- Best digger: Gilbert Longavela (Adamson University)
- Best receiver: Paul Jan Doloiras (University of Santo Tomas)
- Best scorer: John Paul Torres (University of Santo Tomas)
- Best server: Pitrus Paolo de Ocampo (Far Eastern University)
- Best setter: Pitrus Paolo de Ocampo (Far Eastern University)

== Women's tournament ==
=== Season's team line-up ===
Legend
S	Setter
MH	Middle hitter
OH	Open hitter
U	Utility
L	Libero
(c)	Team captain
	Suspended

ADAMSON LADY FALCONS
No.	Player name	Position
1	VASQUEZ, Angelica	L
2	SORIANO, Ma. Paulina	MH
3	PINEDA, Shiela Marie	OH
4	ORTEGA, Jenalyn	OH
5	ZAPANTA, Luisa Mae	U
7	HIPONIA, Jennifer	
8	BENTING, Angela (c)	OH
9	NOVIZA, Lorraine	
10	QUINLOG, Angelica	MH
11	LISTANA, Princess Aimee	
12	PATILANO, Ma. Lourdes	S
14	MACATUNO, May Jennifer	S
16	PIZA, Maria Theresa	
17	CORTEL, Marleen	

ATENEO LADY EAGLES
No.	Player name	Position
1	PATNONGON, Aerieal	MH
3	HO, Gretchen	MH
4	PASCUAL, Bea Charmaine	MH
5	ACEVEDO, Maria Carmina Denise	U
6	GERVACIO, Angeline Marie	OH
7	NACACHI, Ailysse Carol	MH
8	DE JESUS, Jorella Marie	OH
9	BAGATSING, Ramona Jessica	U
11	FAUSTINO, Natasha Graciela	S
12	FERRER, Jamenea (c)	S
13	LAZARO, Dennise Michele	L
15	CAINGLET, Fille Saint Merced	OH
16	AHOMIRO, Rongomaipapa Amy	U
17	TAN, Maria Beatriz Dominique	

DLSU LADY SPIKERS
No.	Player name	Position
1	ESPERANZA, Maria Mikaela	S
2	MARAÑO, Abigail	MH
3	ALARCA, Jacqueline	MH
4	MERCADO, Stephanie	OH
5	GOHING, Melissa	L
6	TATLONGHARI, Diemmy Alexi	MH
7	GUMABAO, Michele	U
8	LEPPING, Isabella	OH
9	GARBIN, Ma. Carmela	S
11	CRUZ, Charleen Abigail (c)	OH
12	TAN, Alexandra Denice	U
15	YEUNG, Clarisse	MH
16	SIY, Joanne	U
18	DEMECILLO, Cydthealee	OH

FEU LADY TAMARAWS
No.	Player name	Position
1	AGNO, Christine	L
2	ROXAS, Mayjorie	MH
3	MAGSUMBOL, Kathlene	U
4	REMIGIO, Robey	S
5	VARGAS, Rosemarie	OH
6	SY, Ina Lois Judea	U
7	ABITAN, Eliza Mae	
8	DAWSON, Samantha Chloe	
9	MORADA, Mecaila Irish May (c)	MH
12	SY, Gyzelle	S
13	BASAS, Anna Laire	L
14	HENSON, Danna	OH
15	TUTANES, Jarita Yvett	
16	BASAS, Marie Toni	

NU LADY BULLDOGS
No.	Player name	Position
1	SAGUN, Elaine	MH
3	DIESTA, Mary Grace	
4	AGANON, Carmina	OH
5	ROSARIO, Christine Joy	
6	SALIBAD, Precious May	S
7	SANTE, Rialen	MH
8	NEPOMUCENO, Maricar	OH
9	MANGUI, Mervic (c)	U
10	SOLIVEN, Jocelyn	S
11	BAYRON, Lucelle	OH
12	REYES, Jennylyn	L
14	DADANG, Siemon	
17	MANDAPAT, Rizza Jane	
18	CAWICAAN, Jelaine	

UE LADY WARRIORS
No.	Player name	Position
1	NEBRIDA, Shiesa	U
2	MARTINEZ, Maureen	
3	DIZON, Jimberly Dawn	OH
4	PONON, Abegail	S
6	MANSO, Ma. Cleo	
7	EVANGELISTA, Noelle	
8	LONGALONG, Lorie Lyn	MH
9	ROSALE, Mary Cristel (c)	MH
10	CRESCINI, Francesca Dominique	
11	PEDROSA, Shane Marrilow	L
12	BALMACEDA, Mary Ann	L
15	CABALLERO, Maria Teresa	MH
16	PARIL, Alyssa Johan	

UP LADY MAROONS
No.	Player name	Position
1	DATA, Denise	S
4	CHUA, Lorraine Gail	
5	ARANETA, Angeli Pauline	OH
7	PALAD, Joyce Antonette	MH
8	GENIDO, Pauline May	MH
9	LAGAHIT, Angela	OH
10	CUEVAS, Vea Di-anne	
11	DEL MUNDO, Ana Maria	S
12	QUEJAS, Marie Eileen	MH
13	ISADA, Amanda Christine	L
14	LASMARIAS, Jezza	
16	SE, Princess Mae	
17	RAMOS, Southlyn	U
18	LOPEZ, Carmela (c)	OH

UST TIGRESSES
No.	Player name	Position
1	DIMACULANGAN, Rhea Katrina	S
2	ESPIRITU, Leah Angelica	U
3	CARANGAN, Katrina	L
4	HIROTSUJI, Midori	MH
5	GONZALES, Sarah Jane	S/U
6	LANTIN, Ma. Loren	S/U
7	DUSARAN, Dancel	L
8	MAIZO, Aiza (c)	U
9	BANATICLA, Maruja	OH
10	ORTIZ, Maika Angela	MH
11	CABALLEJO, Judy Ann	OH
12	BERNAL, Verlyn	OH
18	AMAR, Valerie Jen	OH

=== Elimination round ===
==== Team standings ====
Pos	Team	Pld	W	L	Pts	SW	SL	SR	SPW	SPL	SPR	Qualification
1	De La Salle Lady Archers (H)	14	13	1	27	39	7	5.571	1051	779	1.349	Twice-to-beat in the semifinals
2	UST Growling Tigresses	14	10	4	24	34	20	1.700	1212	1010	1.200	Twice-to-beat in the semifinals
3	Adamson Lady Falcons	14	9	5	23	31	21	1.476	1124	1077	1.044	Twice-to-win in the semifinals
4	Ateneo Lady Eagles	14	8	6	22	29	19	1.526	1057	958	1.103	Twice-to-win in the semifinals
5	NU Lady Bulldogs	14	5	9	19	22	31	0.710	1079	1125	0.959	
6	FEU Lady Tamaraws	14	5	9	19	22	35	0.629	1125	1237	0.909	
7	UP Lady Maroons	14	3	11	17	15	37	0.405	973	1203	0.809	
8	UE Lady Warriors	14	3	11	17	14	36	0.389	898	1130	0.795	

(H) Host

==== Schedule ====
School	Round 1							Round 2						
School	1	2	3	4	5	6	7	8	9	10	11	12	13	14
AdU	La Salle school colors	FEU school colors	UST school colors	UE school colors	Ateneo school colors	NU school colors	UP school colors	La Salle school colors	FEU school colors	UE school colors	UP school colors	NU school colors	UST school colors	Ateneo school colors
Ateneo	UST school colors	NU school colors	UE school colors	La Salle school colors	Adamson school colors	UP school colors	FEU school colors	UST school colors	UP school colors	NU school colors	FEU school colors	UE school colors	La Salle school colors	Adamson school colors
La Salle	Adamson school colors	UP school colors	NU school colors	Ateneo school colors	FEU school colors	UE school colors	UST school colors	Adamson school colors	UE school colors	FEU school colors	NU school colors	Ateneo school colors	UP school colors	UST school colors
FEU	NU school colors	Adamson school colors	UE school colors	UST school colors	La Salle school colors	Ateneo school colors	UP school colors	UE school colors	Adamson school colors	La Salle school colors	Ateneo school colors	NU school colors	UST school colors	UP school colors
NU	FEU school colors	Ateneo school colors	La Salle school colors	UP school colors	UE school colors	Adamson school colors	UST school colors	UP school colors	UST school colors	Ateneo school colors	La Salle school colors	Adamson school colors	FEU school colors	UE school colors
UE	UP school colors	Ateneo school colors	FEU school colors	Adamson school colors	NU school colors	UST school colors	La Salle school colors	FEU school colors	La Salle school colors	Adamson school colors	UST school colors	Ateneo school colors	UP school colors	NU school colors
UP	UE school colors	La Salle school colors	UST school colors	NU school colors	Ateneo school colors	Adamson school colors	FEU school colors	NU school colors	Ateneo school colors	UST school colors	Adamson school colors	UE school colors	La Salle school colors	FEU school colors
UST	Ateneo school colors	UP school colors	Adamson school colors	FEU school colors	UE school colors	NU school colors	La Salle school colors	Ateneo school colors	NU school colors	UP school colors	UE school colors	Adamson school colors	FEU school colors	La Salle school colors

Win
Win via forfeit
Loss
Loss via forfeit

==== Results ====
Results to the right and top of the black cells are first round games, those to the left and below are second round games.

Team	AdU	ADMU	DLSU	FEU	NU	UE	UP	UST
Adamson		3–0	0–3	3–2	3–1	3–0	3–1	2–3
Ateneo	0–3		1–3	3–0	3–1	2–3	3–0	2–3
La Salle	3–0	3–0		3–1	3–0	0–3	3–0	3–0
FEU	3–2	0–3	0–3		1–3	1–3	3–2	0–3
NU	1–3	0–3	0–3	2–3		3–1	3–2	2–3
UE	1–3	0–3	0–3	1–3	0–3		1–3	0–3
UP	0–3	0–3	0–3	1–3	0–3	3–1		0–3
UST	3–0	0–3	2–3	3–2	3–0	3–0	2–3	

Win
Win via forfeit
Loss
Loss via forfeit

==== Forfeiture of games ====
The UAAP board has suspended 4 women volleyball players for eligibility violations: Carmela Garbin and Clarisse Yeung of De La Salle University, Lorraine Chua of University of the Philippines, and Alyssa Paril of University of the East. However, this decision will affect the UAAP games they had played, which will be forfeited in this manner:

	Score		Set 1	Set 2	Set 3	Set 4	Set 5
De La Salle Lady Archers	0–3	UE Lady Warriors	0–25	0–25	0–25		
UP Lady Maroons	0–3	NU Lady Bulldogs	0–25	0–25	0–25		
UE Lady Warriors	0–3	UST Growling Tigresses	0–25	0–25	0–25		

=== Bracket ===
Semifinals (Nos. 1 & 2 have twice-to-beat advantage)
1	La Salle	3
4	Ateneo	2
2	UST	3
3	Adamson	1

Finals (Best-of-three series)
1	La Salle	3	3
2	UST	2	0

* if necessary

=== Semifinals ===
==== UST vs. Adamson ====
February 16; 4:00 PM	UST Growling Tigresses	3–1	Adamson Lady Falcons	Filoil Flying V Arena, San Juan; Attendance: 982; Referees: Rodrigo Rojas and Bob Malenab
February 16; 4:00 PM	(25–23, 25–18, 17–25, 25–21)			Filoil Flying V Arena, San Juan; Attendance: 982; Referees: Rodrigo Rojas and Bob Malenab

==== La Salle vs. Ateneo ====
February 19; 4:00 PM	De La Salle Lady Archers	3–2	Ateneo Lady Eagles	Filoil Flying V Arena, San Juan; Attendance: 2,124; Referees: Nestor Bello and Yul Benosa
February 19; 4:00 PM	(26–24, 21–25, 25–17, 26–28, 15–10); Report			Filoil Flying V Arena, San Juan; Attendance: 2,124; Referees: Nestor Bello and Yul Benosa

=== Finals ===
February 23; 3:00 PM	De La Salle Lady Archers	3–2	UST Growling Tigresses	Filoil Flying V Arena, San Juan; Attendance: 4,146; Referees: Rodrigo Rojas and Yul Benosa
February 23; 3:00 PM	(25–18, 25–20, 19–25, 16–25, 15–13)			Filoil Flying V Arena, San Juan; Attendance: 4,146; Referees: Rodrigo Rojas and Yul Benosa

February 26; 4:00 PM	De La Salle Lady Archers	3–0	UST Growling Tigresses	Filoil Flying V Arena, San Juan; Attendance: 5,596; Referees: Nestor Bello and Yul Benosa
February 26; 4:00 PM	(25–18, 25–17, 28–26)			Filoil Flying V Arena, San Juan; Attendance: 5,596; Referees: Nestor Bello and Yul Benosa

=== Awards ===
UAAP Season 73 women's volleyball champions
De La Salle Lady Archers
Sixth title

- Finals Most Valuable Player: Charleen Abigail Cruz (De La Salle University)
- Season Most Valuable Player: Jacqueline Alarca (De La Salle University)
- Rookie of the Year: Maria Mikaela Esperanza (De La Salle University)
- Best attacker: Jacqueline Alarca (De La Salle University)
- Best blocker: Michele Gumabao (De La Salle University)
- Best digger: Jennylyn Reyes (National University)
- Best receiver: Aiza Maizo (University of Santo Tomas)
- Best scorer: Aiza Maizo (University of Santo Tomas)
- Best server: Jacqueline Alarca (De La Salle University)
- Best setter: Jamenea Ferrer (Ateneo de Manila University)

== Boys' tournament ==
With UE sweeping the elimination round, they were declared automatic champions and the playoffs were scrapped.

=== Elimination round ===
==== Team standings ====
Rank	Team	W	L	PCT	GB
1st place, gold medalist(s)	UE Junior Red Warriors	10	0	1.000	—
2nd place, silver medalist(s)	UST Tiger Cubs	8	2	.800	2
3rd place, bronze medalist(s)	NUNS Bullpups	6	4	.600	4
4	**Zobel Junior Archers**	4	6	.400	6
5	Ateneo Blue Eaglets	2	8	.200	8
6	UPIS Junior Fighting Maroons	0	10	.000	10

Host team in boldface.

==== Last game of the eliminations ====
September 26 – UE Caloocan Gymnasium
Team	1	2	3	4	Sets
UST	**25**	27	14	21	**1**
**UE**	22	**29**	**25**	**25**	**3**

UE wins the championship by sweeping the tournament.

=== Awards ===
UAAP Season 73 boys' volleyball champions
UE Junior Red Warriors
Ninth title, seventh consecutive title

- Most valuable player: Kim Gerald Relcopan (University of the East)
- Rookie of the Year: Edward Camposano (University of the East)
- Best attacker: Mark Carlo Pangan (University of Santo Tomas)
- Best blocker: Carl Michael Manuel (University of the East)
- Best server: Kim Gerald Relcopan (University of the East)
- Best setter: Geuel Asia (University of the East)
- Best receiver: Darren de Dios (University of the East)
- Best libero: (Manuel Sumanguid III (National University)

== Girls' tournament ==
With De La Salle sweeping the elimination round, they were declared automatic champions and the playoffs were scrapped.

=== Elimination round ===
==== Team standings ====
Rank	Team	W	L	PCT	GB
1st place, gold medalist(s)	**La Salle Junior Lady Archers**	6	0	1.000	--
2nd place, silver medalist(s)	UE Junior Amazons	4	2	.667	2
3rd place, bronze medalist(s)	UPIS Junior Lady Maroons	2	4	.333	4
4	UST Lady Tiger Cubs	0	6	.000	6

Host team in boldface.

==== Last game of the eliminations ====
September 26 – UE Caloocan Gymnasium
Team	1	2	3	Sets
**La Salle**	**25**	**25**	**25**	**3**
UE	16	13	22	**0**

La Salle wins the championship by sweeping the tournament.

=== Awards ===
UAAP Season 73 girls' volleyball champions
Zobel Junior Lady Archers
Seventh title

- Most valuable player: Kim Kianna Dy (De La Salle-Santiago Zobel School)
- Rookie of the Year: Alessandra Isabel Narciso (De La Salle-Santiago Zobel School)
- Best attacker: Eunique Chan (University of the East)
- Best blocker: Anna Patricia Coronel (De La Salle-Santiago Zobel School)
- Best server: Marie Nicole Vasquez (De La Salle-Santiago Zobel School)
- Best setter: Alexine Danielle Cabanos (De La Salle-Santiago Zobel School)
- Best receiver: Nina Baltazar (University of the East)
- Best libero: Jeannery Leigh Yap (De La Salle-Santiago Zobel School)

== See also ==
- UAAP Season 73

Preceded by Season 72 (2009–10)	UAAP volleyball tournaments Season 73 (2010–11)	Succeeded by Season 74 (2011–12)
