= EJ Laure =

Filipino volleyball player (born 1997)

Personal information
- Nickname: EJ
- Nationality: Filipino
- Born: Ennajie Cruz Laure; July 31, 1997 (age 29)
- Hometown: Dipolog
- Height: 1.70 m (5 ft 7 in)
- Weight: 58 kg (128 lb)
- Spike: 280 cm (110 in)
- Block: 275 cm (108 in)
- Education: University of Santo Tomas

Volleyball information
- Position: Outside hitter/open hitter
- Current club: Nxled Chameleons

Career
Years	Teams
2016	Foton Tornadoes
2022–2024	Chery Tiggo Crossovers
2024–	Nxled Chameleons

National team
2015	Philippines (U23)

Ennajie Cruz "EJ" Laure-Cariño (born July 31, 1997) is a Filipino professional volleyball player who plays as an outside hitter for the Nxled Chameleons in the Premier Volleyball League (PVL).

She is a member and a former team captain of the UST Golden Tigresses volleyball team, and a former Philippine national team member.

== Career ==
=== High school ===
Laure led the University of Santo Tomas (UST) Girls Volleyball Team to its last championship in Season 76 of UAAP Juniors Volleyball. She was hailed as best attacker and most valuable player. She also received the Best Server award in Season 74. Then, she received the Best Receiver award in Season 75.

=== Collegiate ===
Laure debuted her collegiate career playing for UST Golden Tigresses as a guest player in Shakey's V-League 11th Season 1st Conference. UST reached the semi-finals but failed to finish in podium losing to Adamson University. Laure received the Best Scorer Award of the conference. After her impressive debut in SVL, Laure played for UST in UAAP Season 77. UST failed to reach the final 4, losing to FEU Tamaraws. Laure was declared Rookie of the Year along with Kathleen Arado of UE.

In her second year, Laure and UST joined the Shakey's V-League 12th Season Collegiate Conference. UST settled as fourth placer losing to FEU Lady Tamaraws and she won 2nd Best Open Hitter Award. In UAAP Season 78, Laure was announced as the team captain. UST failed to advance in Final 4 and settled as sixth placer. In the latter part of 2016, Laure led the UST Golden Tigresses in Shakey's V-League 13th Season Reinforced Open Conference competing against club teams and collegiate teams in the Philippines. She led the Golden Tigresses into the semi-finals, the only collegiate team to do so; they finished in fourth place and she won 2nd Best Open Hitter Award. They also participated in UNIGAMES 2016 in Bacolod where they were declared the champion, defeating University of Perpetual Help System Dalta.

==== UAAP ====
Laure led the Golden Tigresses to a third-place podium finish in UAAP Season 79, its 23rd appearance in the Final Four after four years. She ended as the league's third-best scorer, eighth-best spiker, and fifth-best digger.

Laure, together with Rondina, won the back-to-back championship after defeating the DLSU Lady Spikers in the 2017 University Games held in Dumaguete.

Laure sustained a shoulder injury during UAAP Season 80 that left her unable to play until Season 82 in 2020.

=== Foton Tornadoes ===
Laure made her debut in semi-professional volleyball joining the Foton Tornadoes in 2016 PSL All-Filipino Conference where her team ended as a runner-up and claimed the back-to-back Philippine Super Liga Grand Prix Conference title the same year. As part of the championship line-up of Foton Tornadoes, Laure played in 2016 Sealect Tuna Women's Volleyball Championship and 2016 Asian Club Championship. She was awarded as 1st Best Open Hitter last 2017 PSL All-Filipino Conference and her team placed fourth after the conference. She won the bronze medal in the 2017 PSL Grand Prix Conference.

=== International ===
Laure was part of the Philippine youth team that participated at the 2015 Asian Women's U23 Volleyball Championship which was held in Pasig, Philippines.

=== Premier Volleyball League ===
After Foton renamed itself into the Chery Tiggo Crossovers in the Premier Volleyball League in 2021, Laure continued playing for the team until 2024, when she moved to the Nxled Chameleons.

== Personal life ==
Laure is from a family of athletes. She is the daughter of Eddie Laure, a professional basketball player who earned the titles "The Dominator" and "The Bounty Hunter" in his stint in the PBA, and Jovie Laure. Her younger sister, Eya Laure, plays as a utility spiker for the girls' volleyball team of UST High School. Her younger brother, Eco Laure, is a member of the boys' basketball team of NU. She is currently studying at University of Santo Tomas and taking BS Sports and Wellness Management.

On September 3, 2020, Laure posted on Instagram an eighteenth birthday video of her young boyfriend Bugoy Cariño, showcasing their first baby. Back in March 2018, Bugoy Cariño and Laure denied the pregnancy issue through their social media accounts when he was a minor at age 15 years at the time while Laure was already an adult at age 20. Laure and Cariño married in March 2025.

== Awards ==
=== Individuals ===
- 2011 UAAP Season 74 Juniors "Best server"
- 2012 UAAP Season 75 Juniors "Best receiver"
- 2013 UAAP Season 76 Juniors "Best attacker"
- 2013 UAAP Season 76 Juniors "Conference Most Valuable Player"
- 2014 Shakey's V-League Season 11 1st Conference "Best scorer"
- 2015 UAAP Season 77 Seniors "Rookie of the Year"
- 2015 Shakey's V-League Season 12 Collegiate Conference "2nd Best Outside Hitter"
- 2016 Shakey's V-League Season 13 Reinforced Conference "2nd Best Outside Hitter"
- 2017 Philippine Super Liga All-Filipino Conference "1st Best Outside Spiker"

=== High school ===
- 2012 UAAP Season 74 Juniors - Bronze medal, with UST Junior Tigresses
- 2012 UAAP Season 75 Juniors - Bronze medal, with UST Junior Tigresses
- 2013 UAAP Season 76 Juniors- Champion, with UST Junior Tigresses

=== Collegiate ===
- 2016 Philippine University Games - Champion, with UST Golden Tigresses
- 2017 UAAP Season 79 Seniors - Bronze medal, with UST Golden Tigresses
- 2017 Philippine University Games - Champion, with UST Golden Tigresses

=== Clubs ===
- 2016 Philippine Super Liga All-Filipino Conference – Silver medal, with Foton Tornadoes
- 2016 Philippine Super Liga Grand Prix Conference – Gold medal, with Foton Tornadoes
- 2017 Philippine Super Liga Grand Prix Conference – Bronze medal, with Foton Tornadoes
- 2024 PNVF Champions League (Women) – Bronze medal, with Chery Tiggo Crossovers
