= UAAP Season 89 volleyball tournaments =

Volleyball tournaments

UAAP Season 89
- "For Everyone, UAAP"
- Host school: National University (High School)

The UAAP Season 89 volleyball tournaments is the University Athletic Association of the Philippines (UAAP) volleyball tournaments for the 2026–27 school year.

The high school boys' and girls' tournaments began on September 19, 2026.

== Teams ==
All eight member universities of the UAAP fielded teams in the collegiate division while 8 universities fielded teams in the boys' and girls' division, respectively.

Collegiate division
University	Men		Women	
University	Team	Coach	Team	Coach
Adamson University (AdU)	Soaring Falcons	Raffy Mosuela	Lady Falcons	JP Yude
Ateneo de Manila University (ADMU)	Blue Eagles		Blue Eagles	Yoko Zetterlund
De La Salle University (DLSU)	Green Spikers	Raymund "Babes" Castillo	Lady Spikers	Ramil De Jesus and Noel Orcullo
Far Eastern University (FEU)	Tamaraws	Eddieson Orcullo	Lady Tamaraws	Manolo Refugia
National University (NU)	Bulldogs	Dante Alinsunurin	Lady Bulldogs	Norman Miguel
University of the East (UE)	Red Warriors	Jerome Guhit	Lady Red Warriors	Ronwald Kris Dimaculangan
University of the Philippines Diliman (UP)	Fighting Maroons		Fighting Maroons	Benson Bocboc
University of Santo Tomas (UST)	Golden Spikers	Arthur Alan Mamon	Golden Tigresses	Shaq Delos Santos

High School division
High school	Boys' team	Girls' team
Adamson University (AdU)	Baby Falcons	Lady Baby Falcons
Ateneo de Manila University (AdMU)	Blue Eagles	Blue Eagles
De La Salle Santiago Zobel School (DLSZ)	Junior Archers	Junior Lady Archers
Far Eastern University Diliman (FEU-D)	Baby Tamaraws	Lady Baby Tamaraws
Nazareth School of National University (NSNU)	Bullpups	Lady Bullpups
University of the East (UE)	Junior Warriors	Junior Lady Warriors
University of the Philippines Integrated School (UPIS)	Junior Fighting Maroons	Junior Fighting Maroons
University of Santo Tomas Senior High School (UST)	Junior Golden Spikers	Junior Tigresses

== Boys' tournament ==
=== Team line-up ===
Adamson Baby Falcons
No.	Name	Position
1	IGGA, Ivann	
3	MACAM, Johnlee	
4	RESTAN, Dhemver Ivan	
5	BABON, Lance Danielle	
6	BUGAY, John Wayne	
7	DAYAO, Ian	
9	BERNABE, James Michael	
13	GUEVARRA, Henrich	
14	NICOLAS, Vincent Jecko	
15	BAYOR, Pheter Jenn	
17	LIOREN, Josiah Joule	
18	CUMMARENG, Anthony James	
22	REBUALOS, Janjalani	
23	LALAS, Mike Joseph	
25	SINOGBA, Marty Andrei	
	RAMOSO, Marvin	HC

Ateneo Blue Eagles
No.	Name	Position
1	GARCIA, Gabriel Nathan	
2	AVENDANO, Antonio Miguel	
3		
4		
5	LEE, Jaden Uel	
6		
7		
8		
9		
10		
11		
12		
13		
14		
	REGALA, Jay	HC

Zobel Junior Archers
No.	Name	Position
1	CABANTING, Anthony Louis	
3	REFRA, Daniel Martin	
4	RONQILL, John Angelo	
5		
6		
7		
8		
9		
10		
11		
12		
13		
14		
15		
16		
18	Reyjahn Manguiat	
	ESCOL, Arjurna Cubes	HC

FEU–D Baby Tamaraws
No.	Name	Position
1	CAROLINO, Karch Dwayne	L
2	FALLORINA, Neoh Xander	MB
4	SABELLANO, Rene Jr.	MB
5	KOROOSHAVI, Ahmad	OS
7	SERAD, Marl Steven	S
8	CORONEL, Samuel James	L
9	ABUJEN, Alwyn James (c)	L
10	VICENTE, Ken Angelo	MB
11	SANTOS, Yeosef Ashlin	OP
12	PADRONES, Von Andrei	OP
14	GIMERO, One Miguel	OS
15	ABES, Jude Bernard	MB
16	NAGUIT, Eligio III	MB
17	RAMOS, Tyler Jessie	OS
19	MALIWANAG, Kenneth Jan	OP
24	HOPKINS, Samuel Paul	OS
	DULAY, Rene Al	HC

NUNS Bullpups
No.	Name	Position
1	PANILAWON, Vince Angelo	MB
2	GALLEGO, Louie Jeff	S
4	ALMODOVAR, Allen James	OP
5	REYES, Carlo	OS
6	FAVILA, Joem	S
7	DESAMPARADO, Jerald	MB
8	BISCOCHO, Jerowe Ezekiel	OS
9	CARAG, Czar Nathaniel	MB
10	MILLAN, Ronnie (c)	MB
11	MIRANDA, Patrick	OS
12	OCAMPO, Jemil Merari	S
13	ALTOVEROS, Clarenz Matthew	L
15	DAYRIT, Gary Ivan	OS
16	DAIS, Ar-Raquib	S
20	DIN, Samuel Ely	MB
24	MAIGUE, Rayver	L
	BARROGA, Edgar	HC

UE Junior Red Warriors
No.	Name	Position
1	CORDERO, Rovrie Clyde	L
2	PADRONES, Prince Jammer	OP
3	NIOGAN, John Karlo	MB
4	EVANGELISTA, Nathan	OS
5	DULLETE, Mharl Emerie	S
6	PARDE, Jack Manuel	L
7	BALDOZA, Gian (c)	MB/L
8	CUEVAS, Mack Gavin	L
10	HERNANDEZ, Andrei Matthew	L
11	GOROSPE, Khian	S
12	MARCELINO, Emmanuel	OS
13	LINAS, Carl Jamees	MB
16	HIYAO, Khian Martin	MB
20	CALINGO, Rein Alvin	OP
22	DAVID, Steven	OS
	DINO, Arnaldo	HC

UPIS Junior Fighting Maroons
No.	Name	Position
1	JIMÉNEZ, Prince Evans	MB
3	JAYME, Arhin	OP
4	COBIC, Reuben Daniel	OP
5	SUMAYO Jan Brian	OS
6	BAMBA, Marcus Ehane (c)	OS
7	ESCALAW, Zackelli Job	S
8	JUS, Justine Rey John	OP
9	MENDOZA, Joven Carl	L
10	BALUYUT, King Terence	OP
12	DUARTE, Lawrence Allen	OP
13	MANALAYSAN, Wayne Logan	OP
14	VALENCERINA, Gabriel John	S
15	PINGA, Julio Mari	MB
17	DE VERA, Juan Carlo	OS
21	VILLAREAL, Renson Maximus	L
		HC

UST Junior Golden Spikers
No.	Name	Position
1	CAPUNO, Bernard	OS
2	ESCOBAL, Karl Melvin (c)	OS
3	PANGANIBAN, Miguel Antonio	S
4	AGUAS, Kirby James	OS
6	DOMINGO, Cirilo III	OP
7	PILOTON, Christoph John	L
8	ABALOS, Jefferson Misael	S
11	ESTEBAN, Chester Fritz	S
12	GABRIEL, Kian	MB
13	DETOYATO, Carl James	L
14	CARSON, Angus Stephen Jae	MB
15	BUCAYA, Ivbo	OS
18	JULIAN, Markus Josef	MB
20	TOROTORO, Jireh Lorenzo Isaiah	OP
21	TEQUILLO, Kristoff	OS
24	CAPEÑA, Mewin Lionell	MB
	ESTEBAN, Clarence	HC

Legend
S	Setter
MB	Middle Blocker
OH	Outside Hitter
OP	Opposite Hitter
L	Libero
(c)	Team Captain
HC	Head Coach

=== Elimination round ===
==== Team standings ====
Pos	Team	Pld	W	L	Pts	SW	SL	SR	SPW	SPL	SPR	Qualification
1	UST Junior Golden Spikers	14	13	1	37	41	10	4.100	624	489	1.276	Advance to the finals
2	FEU–D Baby Tamaraws	14	12	2	38	40	8	5.000	580	450	1.289	Proceed to stepladder round 2
3	NUNS Bullpups (H)	14	10	4	30	35	15	2.333	597	501	1.192	Proceed to stepladder round 1
4	UE Junior Red Warriors	14	9	5	27	27	19	1.421	499	425	1.174	Proceed to stepladder round 1
5	Adamson Baby Falcons	14	6	8	18	21	24	0.875	485	474	1.023	
6	Zobel Junior Archers	14	3	11	10	12	33	0.364	439	529	0.830	
7	UPIS Junior Fighting Maroons	14	3	11	8	10	35	0.286	514	590	0.871	
8	Ateneo Blue Eagles	14	0	14	0	0	42	0.000	302	600	0.503	

Updated to match(es) played on October 20, 2026. Source: UAAP Volleyball on Livestats
Rules for classification: 1) number of wins; 2) if tied for No. 2 or 4, one-game playoff; 3) match points; 4) sets ratio; 5) points ratio; 6) head-to-head record
(H) Host

==== Match-up results ====
	Round 1							Round 2						
Team ╲ Game	1	2	3	4	5	6	7	8	9	10	11	12	13	14
Adamson	UE school colors	Ateneo school colors	UST school colors	UP school colors	FEU school colors	NU school colors	La Salle school colors	La Salle school colors	UST school colors	Ateneo school colors	NU school colors	UE school colors	FEU school colors	UP school colors
Ateneo	UST school colors	Adamson school colors	FEU school colors	La Salle school colors	NU school colors	UE school colors	UP school colors	UP school colors	NU school colors	Adamson school colors	UE school colors	FEU school colors	UST school colors	La Salle school colors
DLSZ	NU school colors	UP school colors	UE school colors	Ateneo school colors	UST school colors	FEU school colors	Adamson school colors	Adamson school colors	UE school colors	UP school colors	FEU school colors	UST school colors	NU school colors	Ateneo school colors
FEU–D	UE school colors	UP school colors	NU school colors	Ateneo school colors	Adamson school colors	La Salle school colors	UST school colors	NU school colors	UP school colors	UE school colors	La Salle school colors	Ateneo school colors	Adamson school colors	UST school colors
NUNS	UST school colors	La Salle school colors	FEU school colors	UP school colors	Ateneo school colors	Adamson school colors	UE school colors	FEU school colors	Ateneo school colors	UST school colors	Adamson school colors	UP school colors	La Salle school colors	UE school colors
UE	FEU school colors	Adamson school colors	UST school colors	La Salle school colors	UP school colors	Ateneo school colors	NU school colors	UST school colors	La Salle school colors	FEU school colors	Ateneo school colors	Adamson school colors	UP school colors	NU school colors
UPIS	FEU school colors	La Salle school colors	NU school colors	Adamson school colors	UE school colors	UST school colors	Ateneo school colors	Ateneo school colors	FEU school colors	La Salle school colors	UST school colors	NU school colors	UE school colors	Adamson school colors
UST	NU school colors	Ateneo school colors	UE school colors	Adamson school colors	La Salle school colors	UP school colors	FEU school colors	UE school colors	Adamson school colors	NU school colors	UP school colors	La Salle school colors	Ateneo school colors	FEU school colors

Updated to match(es) played on October 20, 2026. Source: UAAP Volleyball on Livestats
= Win; = Loss

==== Game results ====
Results on top and to the right of the solid cells are for first-round games; those to the bottom and to the left of it are second-round games.

Teams	AdU	ADMU	DLSZ	FEU–D	NUNS	UE	UPIS	UST
Adamson Baby Falcons		3–0	3–0	0–3	0–3	0–3	3–0	1–3
Ateneo Blue Eagles	0–3		0–3	0–3	0–3	0–3	0–3	0–3
Zobel Junior Archers	0–3	3–0		0–3	0–3	0–3	2–3	0–3
FEU–D Baby Tamaraws	3–0	3–0	3–0		3–1	3–0	3–0	2–3
NUNS Bullpups	3–1	3–0	3–0	1–3		1–3	3–0	2–3
UE Junior Red Warriors	3–1	3–0	3–1	0–3	0–3		3–0	0–3
UPIS Junior Fighting Maroons	0–3	3–0	0–3	0–3	0–3	1–3		0–3
UST Junior Golden Spikers	3–0	3–0	3–0	3–2	2–3	3–0	3–0	

Updated to match(es) played on October 20, 2026. Source: UAAP Volleyball on Livestats
Legend: Blue = left column team win; Red = top row team win.

== Girls' tournament ==
=== Team line-up ===
Adamson Lady Baby Falcons
No.	Name	Position
1		
2		
3		
4		
5		
6		
7		
8		
9		
10		
11		
12		
13		
14		
	YUDE, JP	HC

Ateneo Blue Eagles
No.	Name	Position
1	SAN AGUSTIN, Olivia	OP
2	IBABAO Marjorie Selene	L
3		
4		
5		
6		
7		
8		
9		
10		
11		
12		
13		
14		
		HC

Zobel Junior Lady Archers
No.	Name	Position
1		
2		
3		
4		
5		
6		
7		
8		
9		
10		
11		
12		
13		
14		
	MONREAL, Jeremiah	HC

FEU–D Lady Baby Tamaraws
No.	Name	Position
1		
2		
3		
4		
5		
6		
7		
8		
9		
10		
11		
12		
13		
14		
	BUNAG, Joanne	HC

NUNS Lady Bullpups
No.	Name	Position
1	BULANDR, Jhaynna Love	
2	ALONZO, Raine Gabrielle	
3	DE GUIA, Venus Anne	
5	BELEN, Ghenievib	
6	ADRAO, Jaila	
7	MAHIHAY, Irish May	
9	TULABU, Danielle Keera	
10	GOULD Micaella	
11	RAYCO, Xyz Ellen	
12	CRUZ, Ysabella Patricia	
13	OLATUNJ, Oluwayemisi Deborah	
14	AGUSTIN, Adeleine Terese	
16	TAYAG, Mardy Elainne	
17	GIDUCOS, Jhezia	
19	TUBALL Maria Ysabelle	
	DIMACULANGAN, Ray Karl	HC

UE Junior Lady Warriors
No.	Name	Position
1	SUY, Leignielle Ann (c)	MB
2	ROXAS, Reeseailyn	OS
4	MARIN, Francesca Kate	L
6	MENDOZA, Deni Rafaela	OP
7	ISON, Aeryn	L
8	SOLAPCO, Gabrielle Denise	S
9	VALIENTE, Haven Ainsley	L
10	SUMAGAYSAY, Janah Romera	OS
11	OCAMPO, Majara Sabine	OP
12	MANAPAT, Meadow Francine	S
13	PAJOT, Ma. Eunice	S
14	JUGAL, Jhuleanne Vernice	MB
15	AGUSTIN, Nicole Ann	OS
19	MONTEBON, Princess Alanie	MB
20	CASTAÑEDA, Queen Kathrine Rose	OP
22	SICAT, Princess Ashley	OS
	MARIN, Von Kenneth	HC

UPIS Junior Fighting Maroons
No.	Name	Position
1		
2		
3		
4		
5		
6		
7		
8		
9		
10		
11		
12		
13		
14		
	HUBALDE, Jarod	HC

UST Junior Tigresses
No.	Name	Position
1	TAN CHUN BING, Andreaj	S
3	CRUZ, Kaite Noerine	OP
4	PEPITO, Chasliey Naomi (c)	L
7	ROMIAS, Jyrah Michelle	OS
9	MENDOZA, Patricia Nicole	MB
10	PELAEZ, Mary Nicole	OS
14	LAAG, Bb Ryzel	MB
15	SESPEÑE, Ryza Mae	OS
16	CALFOFORO, Ciarra Mykylla	MB
17	MENCHAVEZ, Adrianna Eliz	OP
18	TEVES, Taj	OS
19	MANZANILLO, Anneli Sophia	MB
20	HERNANDEZ, Megan Yesha	OP
21	SOTTO, Ysabel Erin	MB
22	SANCHEZ, Maria Lianne	S
23	ESPIRITU, Janine	L
	REYES, Emilio Jr.	HC

Legend
S	Setter
MB	Middle Blocker
OH	Outside Hitter
OP	Opposite Hitter
L	Libero
(c)	Team Captain
HC	Head Coach

=== Elimination round ===
==== Team standings ====
Pos	Team	Pld	W	L	Pts	SW	SL	SR	SPW	SPL	SPR	Qualification
1	NUNS Lady Bullpups (H)	14	14	0	41	42	4	10.500	554	316	1.753	Advance to the finals
2	UST Junior Tigresses	14	11	3	34	36	11	3.273	521	378	1.378	Proceed to stepladder round 2
3	FEU–D Lady Baby Tamaraws	14	10	4	29	32	15	2.133	503	438	1.148	Proceed to stepladder round 1
4	Adamson Lady Baby Falcons	14	9	5	28	32	16	2.000	557	484	1.151	Proceed to stepladder round 1
5	Zobel Junior Lady Archers	14	6	8	18	18	25	0.720	439	480	0.915	
6	Ateneo Blue Eagles	14	4	10	12	12	33	0.364	446	537	0.831	
7	UPIS Junior Lady Maroons	14	2	12	6	7	38	0.184	402	548	0.734	
8	UE Junior Lady Warriors	14	0	14	0	4	42	0.095	352	589	0.598	

Updated to match(es) played on October 16, 2026. Source: UAAP Volleyball on Livestats
Rules for classification: 1) number of wins; 2) if tied for No. 2 or 4, one-game playoff; 3) match points; 4) sets ratio; 5) points ratio; 6) head-to-head record
(H) Host

==== Match-up results ====
	Round 1							Round 2						
Team ╲ Game	1	2	3	4	5	6	7	8	9	10	11	12	13	14
Adamson	NU school colors	Ateneo school colors	FEU school colors	UE school colors	La Salle school colors	UP school colors	UST school colors	NU school colors	UP school colors	UST school colors	UE school colors	La Salle school colors	Ateneo school colors	FEU school colors
Ateneo	La Salle school colors	Adamson school colors	UP school colors	FEU school colors	NU school colors	UST school colors	UE school colors	UE school colors	UST school colors	UP school colors	NU school colors	FEU school colors	Adamson school colors	La Salle school colors
DLSZ	Ateneo school colors	NU school colors	UE school colors	UST school colors	Adamson school colors	FEU school colors	UP school colors	UP school colors	NU school colors	UE school colors	FEU school colors	Adamson school colors	UST school colors	Ateneo school colors
FEU–D	UST school colors	Adamson school colors	UP school colors	Ateneo school colors	UE school colors	La Salle school colors	NU school colors	UST school colors	UE school colors	NU school colors	La Salle school colors	Ateneo school colors	UP school colors	Adamson school colors
NUNS	Adamson school colors	La Salle school colors	UST school colors	UP school colors	Ateneo school colors	UE school colors	FEU school colors	Adamson school colors	La Salle school colors	FEU school colors	Ateneo school colors	UP school colors	UE school colors	UST school colors
UE	UST school colors	UP school colors	La Salle school colors	Adamson school colors	FEU school colors	NU school colors	Ateneo school colors	Ateneo school colors	FEU school colors	La Salle school colors	Adamson school colors	UST school colors	NU school colors	UP school colors
UPIS	UE school colors	Ateneo school colors	FEU school colors	NU school colors	UST school colors	Adamson school colors	La Salle school colors	La Salle school colors	Adamson school colors	Ateneo school colors	UST school colors	NU school colors	FEU school colors	UE school colors
UST	UE school colors	FEU school colors	NU school colors	La Salle school colors	UP school colors	Ateneo school colors	Adamson school colors	FEU school colors	Ateneo school colors	Adamson school colors	UP school colors	UE school colors	La Salle school colors	NU school colors

Updated to match(es) played on October 16, 2026. Source: UAAP Volleyball on Livestats
= Win; = Loss

==== Game results ====
Results on top and to the right of the solid cells are for first-round games; those to the bottom and to the left of it are second-round games.

Teams	AdU	ADMU	DLSZ	FEU–D	NUNS	UE	UPIS	UST
Adamson Lady Baby Falcons		3–0	3–0	3–1	1–3	3–0	3–0	1–3
Ateneo Blue Eagles	0–3		0–3	0–3	0–3	3–1	3–1	0–3
Zobel Junior Lady Archers	0–3	3–0		0–3	0–3	3–1	0–3	0–3
FEU–D Lady Baby Tamaraws	3–2	3–0	3–0		0–3	3–0	3–0	0–3
NUNS Lady Bullpups	3–0	3–0	3–0	3–1		3–0	3–0	3–0
UE Junior Lady Warriors	0–3	1–3	0–3	0–3	0–3		1–3	0–3
UPIS Junior Fighting Maroons	0–3	0–3	0–3	0–3	0–3	3–1		0–3
UST Junior Tigresses	3–1	3–0	3–0	1–3	2–3	3–0	3–0	

Updated to match(es) played on October 16, 2026. Source: UAAP Volleyball on Livestats
Legend: Blue = left column team win; Red = top row team win.

== Overall championship points ==
=== Seniors' division ===
Team	Men	Women	Total
Adamson Soaring Falcons			
Ateneo Blue Eagles			
De La Salle Green Archers			
FEU Tamaraws			
NU Bulldogs			
UE Red Warriors			
UP Fighting Maroons			
UST Growling Tigers			

=== Juniors' division ===
Team	Boys'	Girls'	Points
Adamson Baby Falcons			
Ateneo Blue Eagles			
Zobel Junior Archers			
FEU–D Baby Tamaraws			
NUNS Bullpups			
UE Junior Red Warriors			
UPIS Junior Fighting Maroons			
UST Junior Golden Spikers			

Pts.	Ranking
15	Champion
12	2nd
10	3rd
8	4th
6	5th
4	6th
2	7th
1	8th
—	Did not join

In case of a tie, the team with the higher position in any tournament is ranked higher. If both are still tied, they are listed by alphabetical order.

How rankings are determined:

- Ranks 5th to 8th determined by elimination round rankings.
- Semifinals losers ranked by elimination round rankings
- Loser of the finals is ranked 2nd
- Champion is ranked 1st

Preceded by Season 88 (2026)	UAAP volleyball tournaments Season 89 (2027)	Succeeded by Season 90 (2028)
