= Ara Galang =

Filipino volleyball player

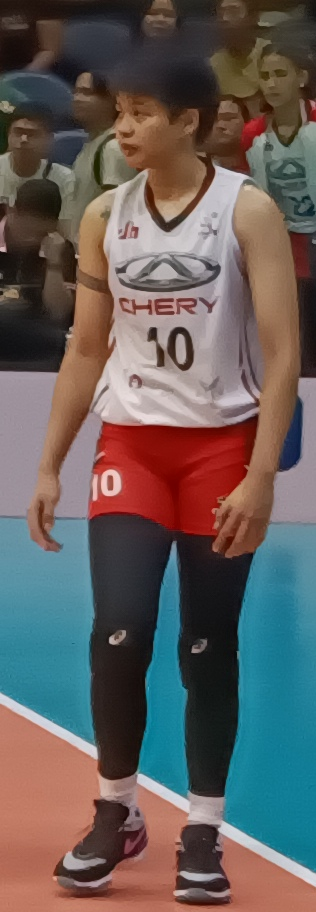
- Galang in 2025

Personal information
- Full name: Victonara Salas Galang
- Nickname: Ara, Vic
- Nationality: Filipino
- Born: January 4, 1995 (age 31)
- Hometown: Angeles City, Philippines
- Height: 172 cm (5 ft 7 1/2 in)
- Weight: 53 kg (117 lb)
- Spike: 282 cm (111 in)
- Block: 270 cm (106 in)
- Education: De La Salle University

Volleyball information
- Position: Outside/Open Hitter Opposite Hitter

Career
Years	Teams
2016–2023	F2 Logistics Cargo Movers
2024–2025	Chery Tiggo Crossovers
2026–present	Farm Fresh Foxies

Victonara "Ara" Salas Galang (born January 4, 1995) is a Filipina professional volleyball player for the Farm Fresh Foxies of the Premier Volleyball League (PVL).

In college, Galang played for the De La Salle University Lady Spikers of the University Athletic Association of the Philippines. She won Rookie of the Year in Season 74 (2012) and won MVP in Season 75 (2013).

After her collegiate career, Galang joined the F2 Logistics Cargo Movers of the Philippine Super Liga and later the Premier Volleyball League, winning four titles out of nine medal finishes, and also winning MVP in the 2018 Invitational Cup. In 2023, after F2 Logistics disbanded, she moved to the Chery Tiggo Crossovers where she would play until its disbandment in 2025.

== Career ==
Galang was discovered by DLSU Lady Spikers head coach, Ramil de Jesus during one of her games at the Shakey's V-League girls division in 2009. She was a junior high school at Angeles University Foundation at that time. She played with AUF Great Danes from 2007 to 2011, being awarded Best Attacker in 2011 in the Shakey's Girls Volleyball League.

She has been awarded with the Sports Achievement Award and Class Valedictorian while in Holy Family Academy in elementary school, Athlete of the Year and Class Valedictorian in the Angeles University Foundation High School and Consistent Dean's Lister in De La Salle University. She also won the Best Server award playing for Palarong Pambansa in 2011.

In 2011, she joined the DLSU Lady Spikers to defend their championship title of the 74th season of UAAP women's volleyball tournament together with Cha Cruz, Michele Gumabao, and Aby Maraño. They were declared as the back-to-back champions and she also grabbed the Best Server award and was hailed as the Rookie of the Year. For the 2012 PVF Intercollegiate Volleyball Championship, she was awarded Best Attacker.

The following season, Galang was awarded Most Valuable Player, shared with Aby Maraño winning her third consecutive championship in the UAAP Season 75 tournament. For the season 76, the DLSU Lady Spikers lost to ADMU Lady Eagles ending their campaign finishing as league's first runner up. She was awarded Best Attacker during the 2014 Philippine National Games. She was chosen as the team captain in Season 77 for the Lady Spikers. She led her team to reach the number two spot on the league with a 10–2 win–loss record on the elimination round. She was also a top contender along with Alyssa Valdez for MVP title of the season. She tore her ACL and MCL ligaments and got a big bone bruise during their do-or-die stepladder match with National University on March 7, 2015. She failed to join her team at the Finals to face the Ateneo Lady Eagles for the fourth consecutive time. However, they were crowned as the first runner up of the league. In the same season, Galang, together with Kim Fajardo and Cyd Demecillo were hailed as first runner up in the beach volleyball tournament. She made her comeback in UAAP Season 78 as she together with her teammates defeated the Ateneo Lady Eagles winning the UAAP Season 78 women's volleyball tournament championship. This was also her last playing year in the UAAP.

Galang began her professional career in the Philippine Super Liga, where she was selected as the first overall draft pick for the 2016 season for the F2 Logistics Cargo Movers. She won the Second Best Outside Spiker individual award in the 2017 Philippine Super Liga All-Filipino Conference while playing with F2 Logistics.

Ara Galang also joined the Alas Pilipinas, the Philippines Women's Volleyball National Team in 2026.

== Personal life ==
Galang has been in relationships with volleyball player Cindy Amutan.

== Awards ==
=== Individuals ===
- 2011 Palarong Pambansa "Best server"
- 2011 Shakey's Girls Volleyball League "Best attacker"
- 2012 PVF Intercollegiate Volleyball Championship "Best attacker"
- 2014 Unigames "Most Valuable Player"
- 2014 POC-PSC Philippine National Games Women's Volleyball "Best attacker"
- UAAP Season 74 "Rookie of the Year"
- UAAP Season 74 "Best server"
- UAAP Season 75 "Most valuable player"
- 2016 PSL All-Filipino "1st Best Outside Spiker"
- 2017 PSL All-Filipino "2nd Best Outside Spiker"
- 2018 PSL Invitational “Most Valuable Player”
- 2019 PSL Grand Prix "1st Best Outside Spiker (local)"
- 2025 PVL Invitational Conference Best Opposite Spiker

=== Collegiate ===
- 2012 PVF Intercollegiate Volleyball Championship - Champions, with DLSU Lady Spikers
- 2014 POC-PSC Philippine National Games Women's Volleyball - Silver medal, with DLSU Lady Spikers
- UAAP Season 74 volleyball tournaments - Champions, with DLSU Lady Spikers
- UAAP Season 75 volleyball tournaments - Champions, with DLSU Lady Spikers
- UAAP Season 76 volleyball tournaments - Silver medal, with DLSU Lady Spikers
- UAAP Season 77 volleyball tournaments - Silver medal, with DLSU Lady Spikers
- UAAP Season 78 volleyball tournaments - Champions, with DLSU Lady Spikers

=== Clubs ===
- 2016 PSL All-Filipino - Champions, with F2 Logistics Cargo Movers
- 2016 PSL Grand Prix - Bronze medal, with F2 Logistics Cargo Movers
- 2017 PSL All-Filipino - Silver medal, with F2 Logistics Cargo Movers
- 2017 Philippine Super Liga Grand Prix Conference - Champions, with F2 Logistics Cargo Movers
- 2018 Philippine Super Liga Grand Prix Conference - Silver medal, with F2 Logistics Cargo Movers
- 2018 PSL Invitational - Champions, with F2 Logistics Cargo Movers
- 2018 Philippine Super Liga All-Filipino Conference - Silver medal, with F2 Logistics Cargo Movers
- 2019 PSL Grand Prix - Silver medal, with F2 Logistics Cargo Movers
- 2019 Philippine Super Liga All-Filipino Conference - Champions, with F2 Logistics Cargo Movers
- 2023 Premier Volleyball League First All-Filipino Conference - Bronze medal, with F2 Logistics Cargo Movers
- 2024 PNVF Champions League (Women) – Bronze medal, with Chery Tiggo Crossovers
- 2025 Premier Volleyball League on Tour - Silver medal, with Chery Tiggo Crossovers
