= Tin Tiamzon =

Filipino-Canadian volleyball player

Ernestine Tiamzon
Personal information
- Full name: Ernestine Grace P. Tiamzon
- Nickname: Tin
- Nationality: Philippines
- Born: May 4, 1997 (age 29) Koronadal, South Cotabato, Philippines
- Home town: Koronadal City, South Cotabato
- Education: De La Salle University
- Height: 1.76 m (5 ft 9 in)
- Weight: 58 kg (128 lb)
- Spike: 280 cm (110 in)
- Block: 270 cm (106 in)

Volleyball information
- Position: Outside hitter
- Current club: Akari Chargers

Career
- Years: Team
- 2017–2019: F2 Logistics Cargo Movers
- 2021: Choco Mucho - Philippines
- 2021–2022: F2 Logistics Cargo Movers
- 2025–2026: Cignal HD Spikers
- 2026–present: Akari Chargers

Ernestine Grace Tiamzon (born May 4, 1997) is a Filipino-Canadian professional volleyball player who is an outside hitter for the Akari Chargers of the Premier Volleyball League (PVL). She was a varsity player of the De La Salle University collegiate women's volleyball team. After her collegiate stint, she played for the F2 Logistics Cargo Movers.

== Personal life ==
Ernestine Tiamzon, also called as "Tin" or "Ernie" by her family and friends, can fluently speak both Filipino and English language. She was born in Koronadal, South Cotabato, Philippines where her family owns and manages a plantation of organically manufactured products registered under Kablon Farms Foods Corporation. Though purely Filipino, she was raised in Canada since she was 8 years old when her family migrated to Burnaby, British Columbia in 2006. She is the youngest of 5 siblings. Her sister, Aika Tiamzon-Billena, was also a former DLSU Lady Spiker.

She was a former high school band member and can play musical instruments such as clarinet and ukulele.

In August 2023, Tiamzon announced her engagement with her girlfriend Shola Alvarez.

== Career ==
Tiamzon originally played basketball in high school. She eventually shifted to volleyball and played with the Moscrop Panthers in Moscrop Secondary School. Back in Canada, she was a member of a club team in Apex Volleyball U18. During her high school career in Canada she was grades 10 South Delta Tournament Most Valuable Player, grades 10 & 11 Invitational Most Valuable Player, grades 8-11 Allstar Awardee and grades 10 & 12 Provincial Allstar. She was also grade 11 second Allstar, grades 8-12 Burnaby/New West Banner champions, Grades 8 & 10 Vancouver & District champions and Grades 11 & 12 second placer (Lower Mainlands).

In February 2015, she was initially invited by DLSU team managers, Raffy Villavicencio and Eric Ongkauko, to join the training of the DLSU Lady Spikers conducted by head coach Ramil de Jesus. She left Canada in July 2015 to finally join and play for the DLSU Lady Spikers and take her scholarship slot at De La Salle University.

Short after arriving in the Philippines, she was assigned as the team's reserve player in the UAAP Season 78 Beach Volleyball tournament. On her first playing year in the University Athletic Association of the Philippines, their trio of seniors Kim Fajardo and Cyd Demecillo won the gold trophy in UAAP Beach Volleyball Championship, a first in La Salle's history.

During the UAAP Season 78 indoor volleyball tournament, she played as an Outside Hitter. They were able to win the golden trophy from their archrivals Ateneo Blue Eagles after 2 years of placing 1st runner-up.

On her sophomore year, Tiamzon served as the team captain in UAAP Season 79 Beach Volleyball tournament where her team-up with Desiree Cheng and Kim Fajardo brought DLSU to bronze finish. In UAAP Season 79 indoor volley, Ernestine has led DLSU's offense and was recognized as Player of the Game in few of the games of the season. In the Finals Series, the Lady Spikers emerged as back-to-back champions giving De La Salle University its 10th championship title in the league.

With F2 Logistics Cargo Movers, Tiamzon won the 2017 PSL Grand Prix Conference championship.

In January 2023, Tiamzon announced her retirement from volleyball after F2 Logistics Cargo Movers announced that Tiamzon and several players have left the team.

In May 2025, it was announced that Tiamzon came out of retirement and decided to play pro again after 2 years by signing a contract with the Cignal HD Spikers.

== Awards ==
=== Collegiate ===
- 2016 UAAP Season 78 volleyball tournaments - Champion, with De La Salle Lady Spikers
- 2017 UAAP Season 79 volleyball tournaments - Champion, with De La Salle Lady Spikers
- 2018 UAAP Season 80 volleyball tournaments - Champion, with De La Salle Lady Spikers
- 2019 UAAP Season 81 volleyball tournaments - Bronze medal, with De La Salle Lady Spikers
- 2016 UAAP Season 78 beach volleyball tournaments - Champion, with De La Salle Lady Spikers
- 2017 UAAP Season 79 beach volleyball tournaments - Bronze, with De La Salle Lady Spikers
- 2018 UAAP Season 81 beach volleyball tournaments - Silver, with De La Salle Lady Spikers
- 2019 UAAP Season 82 beach volleyball tournaments - Silver, with De La Salle Lady Spikers

=== Clubs ===
- 2017 Philippine SuperLiga Grand Prix – Champion, with F2 Logistics Cargo Movers
