= De La Salle Lady Spikers volleyball =

Women's volleyball team of De La Salle University

DLSU Lady Spikers
- University: De La Salle University
- Nickname: Lady Spikers
- Founded: 1975
- Location: Taft Avenue, Manila
- Head coach: Ramil de Jesus
- Captain: Shevana Maria Nicola Laput

Main league
- League: UAAP; NCAA (former)
- Season 88 (2025): Champion

Championships
- UAAP: 13; NCAA: 1 Shakey's V-League: 3 Shakey's Super League: 1 Philippine University Games: 5

Uniforms
Home	Away

The De La Salle University Lady Spikers are the women's collegiate varsity volleyball team of De La Salle University. They compete in the University Athletic Association of the Philippines (UAAP). Ever since winning their first UAAP championship title in 2000, the DLSU Lady Spikers are hailed as the most dominant women's volleyball team in the league with 22 finals appearances as of 2026, and having won 13 championships.

== History ==
The Lady Spikers were the first NCAA women's champions in volleyball when the tournament was introduced in NCAA Season 51 (1975–76). The first UAAP title of the team came in Season 62 (2000). They then won the UAAP title in 2004, 2005, 2006 (as 3-peat champions), 2009, 2011, 2012, 2013 (as 3-peat champions), 2016, 2017, 2018 (as 3-peat champions), 2023, and 2026. They have won a total of 13 titles in the UAAP all under Coach Ramil de Jesus. The Lady Spikers hold the distinction of having appeared in the Finals for ten consecutive times from UAAP Seasons 71 to 80 (2009–2018) which is the longest streak in the Final Four era of the UAAP.

In 2009, the Lady Spikers won against the FEU Lady Tamaraws. The 2009 Lady Spikers' captain, Manilla Santos, was the MVP.

In 2011, the Lady Spikers, powered by stalwarts Abigail Maraño, Michele Gumabao, Charleen Cruz (team captain), Stephanie Mercado and Season MVP Jacqueline Alarca, edged out the UST Tigresses in Game 2 of the Season 73 Finals. Cruz was the Finals MVP.

In 2012, the Lady Spikers swept the elimination round to earn an automatic finals berth and a 1-game advantage in the Finals. After losing their first game in the season in Game 1, the Lady Spikers led by Season MVP Maraño, Gumabao and prized rookies Mika Reyes and Ara Galang defeated the Ateneo Lady Eagles in Games 2 and 3 (winning Game 3 against the Ateneo Lady Eagles in 3 straight sets). Graduating team captain Charleen Cruz was hailed the Most Valuable player of the Finals for the second straight year (Season 73 and 74).

In 2013, after an opening day loss to the UST Golden Tigresses, the Lady Spikers won the rest of their elimination round games to finish with a 13–1 win-loss card. In the Final Four, the Lady Spikers defeated the NU Lady Bulldogs in 3 straight sets to advance to the finals facing rival Ateneo Lady Eagles. In Game 1 of the best of 3 Finals, the Lady Eagles started strong and led 2–0 but the Lady Spikers regained their bearings and came back to win the last 3 sets and win Game 1 despite committing 48 unforced errors. In Game 2, the Lady Spikers, with the leadership of Season MVP and best blocker Aby Maraño together with co-MVP Ara Galang, Mika Reyes, Michele Gumabao, Melissa Gohing, Wensh Tiu, Mika Esperenza, Kim Fajardo and Cyd Demecillo, once again defeated the Ateneo Lady Eagles, handing them their 13th straight loss against the Lady Spikers, 3 sets to none, giving La Salle its eighth UAAP championship and its second 3-peat feat. Gumabao was chosen as Finals MVP.

In 2014, with the goal of capturing a 4-peat title and their 9th UAAP championship in mind, La Salle made a remarkable second 14–0 win-loss eliminations record, making them the first women's volleyball team to achieve the feat, and once again showed no mercy to Ateneo, winning the elimination games against the Katipunan-based female squad. DLSU then got the number 1 spot after defeating every team on its way. The Lady Spikers got the thrice-to-beat advantage, establishing the longest winning streak in UAAP history (standing at 30 games, since its second game during the Season 75 eliminations round, up to the final eliminations game in Season 76). DLSU, however, lost to their nemesis Ateneo (in their third consecutive season matchup for the championship) 3 games to 1 (despite La Salle's 1–0 incentive lead for the tournament's best-of-five championship round), giving the Lady Eagles their first title ever since they joined the UAAP, ending 36 years of drought. The UAAP Season 76 women's volleyball finals series is notable for being the longest championship series in the league's history (lasting 5 games after the Ateneo Lady Eagles overcame La Salle's thrice-to-beat advantage in the 5-set thriller Game 3), with La Salle being the first ever UAAP varsity team to gain an automatic finals berth as top seed but losing to a lower-seed team in the championship series in the 2008 to the present form of the UAAP's Final Four playoffs format era.

In 2016, after losing to Ateneo the previous season without Ara Galang in the finals, they finished with an 11–3 win-loss elimination record, starting strong in the elimination round and even ending the Ateneo Lady Eagles' 24-match winning streak. DLSU then got the number 2 spot entering the Final Four with a twice-to-beat-advantage, but lost to the FEU Lady Tamaraws in game 1 (a 5-set thriller). The Lady Spikers regained their composure as they won in 3 straight sets in Game 2 to advance to the finals facing rival Ateneo Lady Eagles for the 5th consecutive year. In Game 1 of the best of 3 Finals, the Ateneo Lady Eagles started strong and led early but the Lady Spikers regained their bearings and finished to win Game 1 in 3 straight. In Game 2, the Katipunan-based squad rallied from a 0–2 deficit to win in 5 sets with the help of their leading scorer Alyssa Valdez with 34 points. In Game 3, the Lady Spikers, powered by Best Setter Kim Fajardo together with graduating seniors Ara Galang, Mika Reyes, Cyd Demecillo, Mika Esperanza and Carol Cerveza, and juniors Kim Kianna Dy, best blocker Majoy Baron and best digger and best receiver Dawn Macandili, dethroned the Ateneo Lady Eagles, 3 sets to 1, to win their ninth UAAP championship. Kim Kianna Dy was selected as Finals MVP.

In 2017, the Lady Spikers finished with an 11–3 win-loss elimination record gaining a twice to beat advantage in the Final Four Series. The Lady Spikers faced the Lady Tigresses and won in four sets bringing them to another finals appearance against arch rival Ateneo Lady Eagles. The Lady Spikers were able to sweep the Best of Three Finals Series winning in four sets in Game 1 and five sets in Game 2, making them back-to-back champions. Kim Fajardo was awarded UAAP Season 79 Best Setter and Best Server, Dawn Macandili was awarded with UAAP Season 79 Best Receiver and Majoy Baron as UAAP Season 79 MVP. Desiree Cheng was named the Finals MVP. In 2018, the Lady Spikers achieved their third 3-peat after sweeping FEU in the Finals. Dawn Macandili was awarded the Finals MVP.

In 2023, the Lady Spikers won their 12th UAAP championship title in the Season 85 women's volleyball tournament. Angel Canino became the second rookie to be named Season MVP and Rookie of the Year after Mhicaela Belen, and Marionne Alba was named Finals MVP.

In 2026, the Lady Spikers swept the elimination rounds to enter the finals, marking their 22nd appearance. La Salle dethroned the NU Lady Bulldogs and became the third team after the Ateneo Lady Eagles in Season 77 and the NU Lady Bulldogs in Season 84 to sweep the tournament with a flawless 16–0 record, winning their 13th championship title. Team captain Shevana Laput was named the Finals MVP.

In the girls' division, the Junior Lady Spikers represented by De La Salle Santiago Zobel School, have won a league best 10 titles which include a 5-peat from UAAP Seasons 57 to 61 and a 3-peat from Seasons 73 to 75. Junior Lady Spiker stalwarts Kim Kianna Dy and Juniors MVP Andie Narciso matched the 3-peat feat of their senior counterparts. In UAAP Season 81, the Junior Lady Spikers won their 10th championship and ended NU's four-year reign.

Aside from the UAAP, the Lady Spikers also participate in other tournaments. The Lady Spikers are 4-peat Champions of the PVF National Inter-Collegiate Volleyball Tournament nailing the 8th, 9th, 10th & 11th editions of the tournament. They won three successive Shakey's V-League titles – Second Conference of Season 1 in 2004, First Conference of Season 2 in 2005, and First Conference of Season 3 in 2006. They also participated in the Philippine University Games, having won five championships including back-to-back titles in 2025 and 2026. The Lady Spikers also won the Shakey's Super League National Invitationals tournament in 2023.

== Record ==
=== University Athletic Association of the Philippines ===
The DLSU Women's Volleyball Team was formed in 1975 when the women's volleyball tournament was introduced in NCAA Season 51, then later moved to the UAAP in 1986 (Season 49) when De La Salle University was admitted into the league.

DLSU Lady Spikers in UAAP Season 56–present
Season	Place	Most Valuable Player		Finals Opponent	Notes
Season	Place	Season	Finals	Finals Opponent	Notes
Season 56	8th place				
Season 57	7th place				
Season 58	8th place				
Season 59	5th place				
Season 60	4th place				Coach Ramil de Jesus' first coaching
Season 61	2nd place			Far Eastern University	
Season 62	Champion	Iris Ortega	N/A	University of Santo Tomas	1st championship title
Season 63	2nd place			Far Eastern University	
Season 64	2nd place			Far Eastern University	
Season 65	2nd place			Far Eastern University	
Season 66	Champion	Desiree Hernandez	N/A	Far Eastern University	2nd championship title
Season 67	Champion	Maureen Penetrante	N/A	University of Santo Tomas	3rd championship title
Season 68	Champion	Desiree Hernandez	N/A	Adamson University	4th championship title and 1st three-peat
Season 69	No record				Suspended
Season 70	6th place				Forfeited
Season 71	Champion	Manilla Santos	N/A	Far Eastern University	5th championship title
Season 72	2nd place			University of Santo Tomas	
Season 73	Champion	Jacqueline Alarca	Charleen Abigaile Cruz	University of Santo Tomas	6th championship title
Season 74	Champion	Abigail Maraño	Charleen Abigaile Cruz	Ateneo de Manila University	7th championship title
Season 75	Champion	Abigail Maraño and Victonara Galang	Michele Theresa Gumabao	Ateneo de Manila University	8th championship title and 2nd three-peat
Season 76	2nd place			Ateneo de Manila University	
Season 77	2nd place			Ateneo de Manila University	
Season 78	Champion		Kim Kianna Dy	Ateneo de Manila University	9th championship title
Season 79	Champion	Mary Joy Baron	Desiree Wynea Cheng	Ateneo de Manila University	10th championship title
Season 80	Champion		Dawn Nicole Macandili	Far Eastern University	11th championship title and 3rd three-peat
Season 81	3rd place				
Season 84	2nd place			National University	
Season 85	Champion	Angel Anne Canino	Marionne Angelique Alba	National University	12th championship title
Season 86	3rd place				
Season 87	2nd place			National University	
Season 88	Champion		Shevana Laput	National University	13th championship title

=== Shakey's Super League ===
DLSU Lady Spikers in SSL 2022–present
Year	Place	Most Valuable Player	Finals Opponent	Notes
2022	2nd place		National University	
2023	Champion	Shevana Maria Nicola Laput	Adamson University	1st championship title
2024	2nd place		National University	

== Roster ==
UAAP Season 89 Roster
No.	Name	Position	Height	Playing Year
1	Maria Michaela Santos	OP	1.86 m (6 ft 1 in)	2nd
3	Ashlee Buenaventura	MB	1.94 m (6 ft 4 in)	2nd
4	Francesca Sofia Rodriguez	L	1.55 m (5 ft 1 in)	3rd
5	Lyka May De Leon	L	1.55 m (5 ft 1 in)	5th
7	Shevana Maria Nicola Laput (c)	OP	1.88 m (6 ft 2 in)	5th
8	Althea Brean Marie Cabradilla	OH	1.86 m (6 ft 1 in)	2nd
9	Eshana Rose Nunag	S	1.73 m (5 ft 8 in)	2nd
10	Mikole Reyes	S	1.77 m (5 ft 10 in)	3rd
11	Mary Shane Reterta	OH	1.76 m (5 ft 9 in)	3rd
12	Angel Anne Canino	OH	1.80 m (5 ft 11 in)	5th
15	Amie Provido	MB	1.80 m (5 ft 11 in)	5th
16	Ella Kathrina De Guzman	OH	1.72 m (5 ft 8 in)	2nd
17	Vida Dominique Caringal	MB	1.80 m (5 ft 11 in)	2nd
21	Jhianna May De Jesus	L	1.67 m (5 ft 6 in)	2nd
22	Katrina Del Castillo	MB	1.80 m (5 ft 11 in)	4th
23	Angel Lou Ewis	MB	1.83 m (6 ft 0 in)	2nd

Legend
(c)	Team Captain
OH	Outside Hitter
MB	Middle Blocker
OP	Opposite Hitter
S	Setter
L	Libero

=== Team staff ===
Name	Position
Ramil de Jesus	Head coach
Noel Orcullo	Assistant coach
Gian de Jesus	Assistant coach
Marlon Celis	Strength and conditioning coach
	Trainer
	Trainer
	Physical therapist

== Notable players ==
- Aby Maraño
- Angel Canino
- Ara Galang
- Cha Cruz-Behag
- Chie Saet
- Cienne Cruz
- Dawn Macandili-Catindig
- Des Clemente-de Guzman
- Desiree Cheng
- Erika Santos
- Ernestine Tiamzon
- Fifi Sharma
- Justine Jazareno
- Kim Fajardo
- Kim Kianna Dy
- Majoy Baron
- Manilla Santos-Ng
- Mars Alba
- Melissa Gohing-Nacino
- Michele Gumabao
- Mika Reyes
- Thea Gagate

== See also ==
- De La Salle University
  - De La Salle Green Archers and Lady Archers
    - De La Salle Green Archers basketball
    - De La Salle Green Spikers volleyball
    - De La Salle Lady Booters football
