= UAAP Season 78 volleyball tournaments =

Volleyball tournaments

UAAP Season 78 Volleyball
- Host school: University of the Philippines Diliman
Men's Finals	G1	G2	Wins
Ateneo Blue Eagles	3	3	2
NU Bulldogs	1	0	0
- Duration: 23–27 April 2016
- Arena(s): Smart Araneta Coliseum, Mall of Asia Arena
- Finals MVP: Ysrael Wilson Marasigan
- Winning coach: Oliver Almadro
- Semifinalists: Adamson Soaring Falcons; UP Fighting Maroons
- TV network(s): ABS-CBN Sports+Action, ABS-CBN Sports+Action HD, The Filipino Channel
Women's Finals	G1	G2	G3	Wins
Ateneo Lady Eagles	0	3	1	1
De La Salle Lady Archers	3	2	3	2
- Duration: 23–30 April 2016
- Arena(s): Smart Araneta Coliseum, Mall of Asia Arena
- Finals MVP: Kim Kianna Dy
- Winning coach: Ramil De Jesus
- Semifinalists: FEU Lady Tamaraws; UP Lady Maroons
- TV network(s): ABS-CBN, ABS-CBN HD, ABS-CBN Sports+Action, ABS-CBN Sports+Action HD, The Filipino Channel

The UAAP Season 78 high school volleyball tournament started on August 22, 2015. The tournament venue is the Adamson University Gym in San Marcelino St., Ermita, Manila. Adamson is the tournament host. The number of participating schools in the boys' and girls' tournaments both increased to seven. Far Eastern University fielded boys' and girls' volleyball teams beginning season 77. Since there are now seven participating schools, the tournaments have a Final Four format. The UAAP Board decided to move the high school volleyball tournaments from 2nd semester to 1st semester due to the basketball juniors tournament being moved from the 1st semester to 2nd semester.

The UAAP Season 78 seniors' division volleyball tournament started on January 31, 2016. Originally, before the schedule was moved, the UAAP Season 78 seniors' division volleyball tournament opening was scheduled on February 13 and January 30. The tournament main venue is the Filoil Flying V Arena in San Juan City while selected games were played at the PhilSports Arena in Pasig, Smart Araneta Coliseum in Cubao, Quezon City, and the Mall of Asia Arena in Pasay. UP is the tournament host.

Ateneo De Manila University Blue Eagles claimed their back to back title after beating the National University Bulldogs in Games 1 and 2 of the best of 3 series.

On the other hand, the De La Salle University Lady Spikers won their 9th crown after defeating the defending champions Ateneo De Manila Lady Eagles in the do-or-die game of the finals.

== Men's tournament ==
=== Season's team line-up ===
ADAMSON FALCONS
No.	Player name	Position
1	RAMIREZ, Karlle Nico	S
2	PLETADO, Dave John	MB
3	DAVID, Juan Christopher	MB
4	SARMIENTO, Jerome	OS
5	SUDARIA, Michael (c)	OS
6	SARAZA, Bryan	OP
7	YUDE, John Philip	OS
8	PABLICO, Paolo	MB
9	MENDIOLLA, Jelex Jay	L
10	ALVAREZ, Mark Angelo	OS
11	CONSUJI, Ernest Ryan	S
12	MELGAR, Rence	L
13	LABANG, George	
14	MANLAPAZ, Krister Edward	
	CUSTODIO, Domingo	HC

ATENEO BLUE EAGLES
No.	Player name	Position
1	MAGADIA, Lawrence Gil	S
2	BAYSA, Karl Irvin	OS/OP
3	MEDALLA, Ron Adrian	OS/OP
4	VILLANUEVA, Joshua Alexis Miguel	MB
5	TAN, Jasper Rodney	MB
8	MARASIGAN, Ysrael Wilson (c)	OP
11	INTAL, Rex Emmanuel	MB
12	POSADAS, Dan Angelo	L
13	SUMANGUID, Manuel	L
14	POLVOROSA, Esmilzo Joner	S
15	ESPEJO, Marck Jesus	OS
16	GLORIOSO, Gian Carlo	MB
17	CUERVA, Sebastian Enrique	OS
18	RIVERA, Ishmael John	OS
	ALMADRO, Oliver	HC

DLSU GREEN SPIKERS
No.	Player name	Position
1	CALASIN, Ralph	MB
2	MARAVILLA, Zosimo	
3	WOO, Raymark (c)	OS
5	DELOS REYES, John	
6	MOVIDO, Jopet	L
7	DUMAGO, Cris Joy	OP
8	ONIA, John	OS
9	MARCO, Wayne	S
10	JOSE, Edmund	MB
11	ASIA, Reuel	L
14	BACON, Geraint	MB
17	ASIA, Geuel	S
18	DIMAYUGA, Levin	OS
19	FREY, Mike	OP
	DULAY, Ronald	HC

FEU TAMARAWS
No.	Player name	Position
1	PALER, Redijohn	OS
2	SOLIS, Richard	OP
3	SILANG, Kris	S
4	SUAREZ, Owen	S
5	MARMETO, Rikko	L
6	VILLEGAS, Ronchette	S
7	GARCIA, Jude	OS
8	GACUTAN, Jeric	OP
9	BARRICA, Joshua (c)	OS
10	MARMETO, Leo	L
11	BUGAOAN, John	MB
13	MARGATE, Gene	MB
15	QUIEL, Peter	OS
16	DOLOR, Gregorio	MB
	DIAZ, Reynaldo	HC

NU BULLDOGS
No.	Player name	Position
1	MANGULABNAN, Vincent (c)	S
2	ANCHETA, Jann	
3	DAYANDANTE, Kim	S
4	OGOC, John	OS
6	MONDERO, Banjo	
7	NATIVIDAD, James	OS
8	BAGUNAS, Bryan	OS
11	SAURA, Francis	MB
12	SUMAGUI, Jann	L
14	DAYMIL, Berhashidin	
15	MARCOS, Ricky	L
16	BAYSAC, Ruben	MB
17	MALABUNGA, Kim	MB
19	GAMPONG, Madzlan	OP
	ALINSUNURIN, Dante	HC

UE RED WARRIORS
No.	Player name	Position
1	PRON, Allen	L
2	ADVIENTO, Roniey	
3	Lelic, Samuel	
4	SAGUIN, Jose	
5	INOFERIO, Clifford	L
6	ALJAS, Alven	
7	IMPERIAL, Adrian Rafael	S
8	ALBA, Angelo	MB
9	MAGDAONG, Vincent	S
10	GOPIO, Christian	S
11	CAMPOSANO, Edward (c)	OS
12	ORTEGA, Geric	MB
14	ABROT, Ruvince	OS
17	YEN CHEUNG, Patrick	
	PASCUAL, Roel	HC

UP FIGHTING MAROONS
No.	Player name	Position
1	BALDELOVAR, Jarahmeel	S
4	CASTILLO, John Mark	MB
3	CONSUELO, Nicolo	OS
5	RAYMUNDO, Julius	MB
6	SAN PEDRO, Jerry	OP
8	NASOL, John Miguel	L
9	MADRIGALEJOS, John Carlo	OS
10	MIGUEL, Wendel	OS
11	VALBUENA, Alfred Gerard (c)	OS
12	MILLETE, John Mark	OP
13	LUNA, Wilhelm	L
14	TRINIDAD, Lorenzo	MB
15	ACUNA, Charles	S
18	SAN PASCUAL, Gian	MB
	PALMERO, Rodrigo	HC

UST GROWLING TIGERS
No.	Player name	Position
2	CASTILLO, Paul Kirby (c)	S
3	BAUTISTA, Arnold	OS
4	AMAGAN, Jomaru	OS
5	BALSE, Patrick	MB
6	ARBASTO, Anthony	OP
7	SUMAGAYSAY, Jayvee	MB
8	PANGAN, Mark Carlo	L
9	TAJANLANGIT, Timothy James	S
10	MEDINA, Manuel	OS
13	GUZMAN, Kris	OS
14	BURO, Juren	
16	CARODAN, Tyrone	OP
17	FRANCISCO, Justin	L
18	SARABIA, Jason	MB
	MAMON, Arthur "Odjie"	HC

Legend
S	Setter
MB	Middle Blocker
OS	Outside Spiker
OP	Opposite Spiker
L	Libero
(c)	Team Captain
HC	Head Coach

=== Elimination round ===
==== Team standings ====
Pos	Team	Pld	W	L	Pts	SW	SL	SR	SPW	SPL	SPR	Qualification
1	Ateneo Blue Eagles	14	13	1	38	41	9	4.556	1203	975	1.234	Twice-to-beat in the semifinals
2	NU Bulldogs	14	10	4	29	32	17	1.882	1154	1085	1.064	Twice-to-beat in the semifinals
3	Adamson Soaring Falcons	14	9	5	24	29	26	1.115	1241	1220	1.017	Twice-to-win in the semifinals
4	UP Fighting Maroons (H)	14	8	6	24	28	25	1.120	1187	1179	1.007	Twice-to-win in the semifinals
5	FEU Tamaraws	14	7	7	23	28	25	1.120	1126	1206	0.934	
6	De La Salle Green Archers	14	5	9	16	24	32	0.750	1228	1259	0.975	
7	UST Growling Tigers	14	4	10	13	19	30	0.633	1090	1124	0.970	
8	UE Red Warriors	14	0	14	1	5	42	0.119	910	1159	0.785	

Source: ABS-CBN Sports
Rules for classification: 1) number of wins; 2) if tied for #2 or #4, one-game playoff; 3) match points; 4) sets ratio; 5) points ratio; 6) head-to-head record
(H) Host

==== Match-up results ====
	Round 1							Round 2						
Team ╲ Game	1	2	3	4	5	6	7	8	9	10	11	12	13	14
AdU	NU school colors	UE school colors	Ateneo school colors	FEU school colors	La Salle school colors	UP school colors	UST school colors	NU school colors	UST school colors	FEU school colors	La Salle school colors	UE school colors	Ateneo school colors	UP school colors
AdMU	UST school colors	FEU school colors	Adamson school colors	La Salle school colors	UP school colors	UE school colors	NU school colors	FEU school colors	UP school colors	NU school colors	UST school colors	La Salle school colors	UE school colors	Adamson school colors
DLSU	UE school colors	NU school colors	Ateneo school colors	UP school colors	Adamson school colors	FEU school colors	UST school colors	UP school colors	FEU school colors	UST school colors	Adamson school colors	Ateneo school colors	NU school colors	UE school colors
FEU	UP school colors	Ateneo school colors	UE school colors	Adamson school colors	UST school colors	La Salle school colors	NU school colors	Ateneo school colors	La Salle school colors	Adamson school colors	UE school colors	UP school colors	NU school colors	UST school colors
NU	Adamson school colors	La Salle school colors	UP school colors	UST school colors	UE school colors	Ateneo school colors	FEU school colors	Adamson school colors	UE school colors	Ateneo school colors	UP school colors	UST school colors	FEU school colors	La Salle school colors
UE	La Salle school colors	Adamson school colors	FEU school colors	UST school colors	NU school colors	Ateneo school colors	UP school colors	UST school colors	NU school colors	UP school colors	FEU school colors	Adamson school colors	Ateneo school colors	La Salle school colors
UP	FEU school colors	UST school colors	NU school colors	La Salle school colors	Ateneo school colors	Adamson school colors	UE school colors	La Salle school colors	Ateneo school colors	UE school colors	NU school colors	FEU school colors	UST school colors	Adamson school colors
UST	Ateneo school colors	UP school colors	UE school colors	NU school colors	FEU school colors	Adamson school colors	La Salle school colors	UE school colors	Adamson school colors	La Salle school colors	Ateneo school colors	NU school colors	UP school colors	FEU school colors

Source: ABS-CBN Sports
= Win; = Loss

==== Scores ====
Results to the right and top of the gray cells are first round games, those to the left and below are second round games.

Team	AdU	ADMU	DLSU	FEU	NU	UE	UP	UST
Adamson		3–2	3–1	3–1	0–3	3–0	3–2	3–1
Ateneo	3–0		3–2 ɪ	3–0	3–0	3–0	3–0	3–0
La Salle	2–3	0–3		1–3	0–3	3–0	1–3	0–3 ɪ
FEU	1–3	2–3	1–3		3–1	3–0	3–0	3–1
NU	3–1	1–3	3–2	3–0		3–0	0–3	3–0
UE	1–3	0–3	0–3	1–3	1–3		2–3	0–3
UP	3–1	0–3	2–3	3–2	0–3	3–0		3–1
UST	3–0	1–3	2–3 ɪ	0–3	1–3	3–0	0–3	

Source: ABS-CBN Sports
Legend: Blue = left column team win; Red = top row team win.

=== Playoffs ===
==== Playoffs / Finals ====
Semifinals (Nos. 1 & 2 have twice-to-beat advantage)
1	Ateneo	3
4	UP	0
2	NU	1	3
3	Adamson	3	1

Finals (Best-of-three series)
1	Ateneo	3	3
2	NU	1	0

=== Semifinals ===
ADMU vs UP ADMU with twice-to-beat advantage.
Elimination round results:

- (Feb 21) ADMU def. UP 3–0 • 25–16, 25–18, 25–14
- (Mar 09) ADMU def. UP 3–0 • 25–9, 27–25, 25–15

April 16; 02:00 PM (UTC +8:00)	Ateneo Blue Eagles	3–0	UP Fighting Maroons	MOA Arena, Pasay
April 16; 02:00 PM (UTC +8:00)	(25–12, 25–13, 25–16); Report			MOA Arena, Pasay

NU vs ADU NU with twice-to-beat advantage.
Elimination round results:

- (Feb 03) NU def. ADU 3–0 • 25–22, 25–22, 25–7
- (Mar 06) NU def. ADU 3–1 • 25–23, 25–23, 25–27, 25–22

April 17; 02:00 PM (UTC +8:00)	NU Bulldogs	1–3	Adamson Soaring Falcons	MOA Arena, Pasay
April 17; 02:00 PM (UTC +8:00)	(25–23, 17–25, 21–25, 22–25); Report			MOA Arena, Pasay

April 20; 02:00 PM (UTC +8:00)	NU Bulldogs	3–1	Adamson Soaring Falcons	MOA Arena, Pasay
April 20; 02:00 PM (UTC +8:00)	(19–25, 25–20, 25–20, 25–23); Report			MOA Arena, Pasay

=== Finals ===
ADMU vs NU Best–of–three series
Elimination round results:

- (Feb 27) ADMU def. NU 3–0 • 25–19, 25–15, 25–15
- (Mar 13) ADMU def. NU 3–1 • 26–28, 25–23, 25–21, 25–17

April 23; 12:00 (UTC +8:00)	Ateneo Blue Eagles	3–1	NU Bulldogs	Smart Araneta Coliseum, Quezon City
April 23; 12:00 (UTC +8:00)	(23–25, 25–20, 25–17, 25–18); Report			Smart Araneta Coliseum, Quezon City

April 27; 12:00	Ateneo Blue Eagles	3–0	NU Bulldogs	MOA Arena, Pasay
April 27; 12:00	(25–16, 25–20, 25–19)			MOA Arena, Pasay

=== Broadcast notes ===
Game	Play-by-play	Analyst	Courtside Reporters	Upfront at the UAAP Hosts
Finals Game 1	Eric Tipan	Ivy Remulla	Laura Lehmann and Ira Pablo	Bea Daez, Natasha Alquiros and Justin Quirino
Finals Game 2	Eric Tipan	Ronnie Magsanoc	Laura Lehmann and Ira Pablo	--No Upfront due to Awarding Ceremony--

Awarding Ceremony host: Janeena Chan

=== Awards ===
UAAP Season 78 men's volleyball champions
Ateneo Blue Eagles
Second title, second consecutive title

- Most valuable player (Season): Marck Jesus Espejo (Ateneo Blue Eagles)
- Most valuable player (Finals): Ysrael Wilson Marasigan (Ateneo Blue Eagles)
- Rookie of the Year: James Martin Natividad (NU Bulldogs)
- Best scorer: Raymark Woo (De La Salle Green Archers)
- Best attacker: Marck Jesus Espejo (Ateneo Blue Eagles)
- Best blocker: Edward Camposano (UE Red Warriors)
- Best server: Marck Jesus Espejo (Ateneo Blue Eagles)
- Best digger: Ricky Marcos (NU Bulldogs)
- Best setter: Esmilzo Polvorosa (Ateneo Blue Eagles)
- Best receiver: Rikko Marius Marmeto (FEU Tamaraws)

== Women's tournament ==
=== Season's team line-up ===
ADAMSON LADY FALCONS
No.	Player name	Position
1	MATIAS, Lynne	S
2	ROQUE, Mhay	OS
3	FLORA, Bernadette	OS
4	PAAT, Mylene (c)	OP
5	DACORON, Joy	MB
7	TEMPIATURA, Jellie	L
8	EMNAS, Fhen	S
9	WANTA, Ciarnelle	OS
10	MOMO, Ronjean	OP
12	GALANZA, Jema	OS
15	JOAQUIN, Awit	MB
16	LEBUMFACIL, Keith Dempoll	L
17	ALKUINO, Erika	MB
18	MOHAMMAD, Anwarlyn	S
	CUSTODIO, Domingo	HC

ATENEO LADY EAGLES
No.	Player name	Position
2	VALDEZ, Alyssa (c)	OS
3	WONG, Ma. Deanna Izabella	S
4	LO, Jennelle Marie	L/OS
5	TAJIMA, Mary Mae	MB
6	LAVITORIA, Jamie Isabelle	L
7	TAN, Ma. Gizelle Jessica	L
8	GASTON, Pauline Marie Monique	OP
11	GASTON, Therese Marie Marguerette	OS
12	MORADO, Julia Melissa	S
14	DE LEON, Isabel Beatriz	MB
15	MARAGUINOT, Jhoana Louisse	OS
16	AHOMIRO, Rongomaipapa Amy	OP/MB
17	MADAYAG, Madeleine Yrenea	MB
18	GEQUILLANA, Kassandra Miren	OS/OP
	BUNDIT, Anusorn "Tai"	HC

DLSU LADY SPIKERS
No.	Player name	Position
1	ESPERANZA, Mika	S
3	REYES, Mika Aereen	MB
4	CERVEZA, Carol	OP
5	MACANDILI, Dawn Nicole	L
7	LUNA, May	OS
8	GALANG, Victonara	OS
9	FAJARDO, Kim (c)	S
10	BARON, Mary Joy	MB
11	DY, Kim Kianna	OP
12	SAGA, Carmel	L
15	TIAMZON, Ernestine Grace	OS
16	IPAC, Norielle	MB
18	DEMECILLO, Cydthealee	OS
19	SOYUD, Christine	OP
	DE JESUS, Ramil	HC

FEU LADY TAMARAWS
No.	Player name	Position
1	HERNANDEZ, Carlota	OS
2	PONS, Bernadette	OS
3	VILLAREAL, Jeanette	MB
4	GUINO-O, Heather	OS
5	DUREMDEZ, Ria Beatriz	L
6	DIONELA, Joanne	L
8	CAYUNA, Angelica	S
9	PALMA, Remy (c)	MB
10	BAL, Via	OS
11	ATIENZA, Kyla	L
12	NEGRITO, Kyle	S
14	SY, Gyzelle	S
15	MALABANAN, Jerrili	OS/MB
16	BASAS, Toni	OP
	DELOS SANTOS, Cesael "Shaq"	HC

NU LADY BULLDOGS
No.	Player name	Position
1	DIOLAN, Rica	S
2	PEREZ, Ivy Jisel	S
3	SANTIAGO, Alyja Daphne	MB
4	NABOR, Jasmine	OP
5	GENERAL, Fatima Bia	L
6	DOROMAL, Roma	OP
7	PABLO, Marites	OS
9	URDAS, Aiko	OP
10	SOLIVEN, Jocelyn	S
11	DORIA, Roselyn	MB
13	VALDEZ, Gayle	L
14	SINGH, Jorelle	OS
17	PABLO, Myla (c)	OS
	GORAYEB, Roger	HC

UE LADY WARRIORS
No.	Player name	Position
1	ABIL, Judith	OS
2	DOMINGO, Celine (c)	OS
3	GABARDA, Mariella	MB
4	MENDREZ, Mean	MB
5	ARADO, Kath	L
6	CATINDIG, Juliet	OS
7	RODRIGUEZ, Seth	OS
8	DISQUITADO, Dana	S
10	CAMAMA, Isa	OS
11	ADORADOR, Shaya	OP
12	BALITON, Roselle	MB
14	BENDONG, Laizah	S
15	ALCAYDE, Jasmine	OP
16	DACAYMAT, Angelica	OS
	VICENTE, Francis	HC

UP LADY MAROONS
No.	Player name	Position
1	LAI, Jewel Hannah	S
2	BASARTE, Mae	S
3	LAYUG, Maristella	MB
7	CHOPITEA, Sheena	MB
8	BERSOLA, Katherine Adrielle (c)	MB
10	MOLDE, Isa	OS
11	BUITRE, Marian	MB
12	GAISER, Pia	L
13	DOROG, Justine	OS
14	GANNABAN, Aeisha	MB
15	ALINAS, Vina	OS/OP
17	ESTRAÑERO, Ayel	L
18	CARLOS, Diana	OP
19	TIAMZON, Nicole	OS/OP/S
	YEE, Jerry	HC

UST TIGRESSES
No.	Player name	Position
1	TEOPE, Alyssa	S
2	RIVERA, Rica Jane	OP
3	CORTEZ, Chlodia	MB/OP
4	REYES, Ingrid	L
5	SANDOVAL, Carla	OP
7	BICAR, Alina	S
8	TUNAY, Carmela	OP
9	LAURE, Ennajie (c)	OS
10	CABANOS, Alexine	S
12	DIZON, Mia	L
14	FRANCISCO, Christine	MB
15	DE LEON, Jessey	MB
16	RONDINA, Cherry Ann	OS
18	MENESES, Marivic	MB
	Sgt. REYES, Emilio Jr. "Kung Fu"	HC

Legend
S	Setter
L	Libero
MB	Middle Blocker
OS	Outside Hitter
OP	Opposite Hitter
(c)	Team Captain
HC	Head Coach

=== Elimination round ===
==== Team standings ====
Pos	Team	Pld	W	L	Pts	SW	SL	SR	SPW	SPL	SPR	Qualification
1	Ateneo Lady Eagles	14	12	2	35	37	9	4.111	1094	858	1.275	Twice-to-beat in the semifinals
2	De La Salle Lady Archers	14	11	3	33	36	14	2.571	1163	910	1.278	Twice-to-beat in the semifinals
3	FEU Lady Tamaraws	14	9	5	27	31	24	1.292	1200	1181	1.016	Twice-to-win in the semifinals
4	UP Lady Maroons (H)	14	8	6	25	29	22	1.318	1151	1133	1.016	Twice-to-win in the semifinals
5	NU Lady Bulldogs	14	7	7	22	26	25	1.040	1099	1065	1.032	
6	UST Growling Tigresses	14	5	9	15	24	31	0.774	1150	1209	0.951	
7	Adamson Lady Falcons	14	3	11	8	14	37	0.378	1042	1199	0.869	
8	UE Lady Warriors	14	1	13	3	4	39	0.103	718	1062	0.676	

Source: ABS-CBN Sports
Rules for classification: 1) number of wins; 2) if tied for #2 or #4, one-game playoff; 3) match points; 4) sets ratio; 5) points ratio; 6) head-to-head record
(H) Host

==== Match-up results ====
	Round 1							Round 2						
Team ╲ Game	1	2	3	4	5	6	7	8	9	10	11	12	13	14
AdU	UST school colors	NU school colors	La Salle school colors	UP school colors	Ateneo school colors	FEU school colors	UE school colors	NU school colors	UP school colors	UST school colors	La Salle school colors	Ateneo school colors	FEU school colors	UE school colors
AdMU	NU school colors	UST school colors	FEU school colors	UP school colors	Adamson school colors	UE school colors	La Salle school colors	UP school colors	NU school colors	FEU school colors	UST school colors	Adamson school colors	UE school colors	La Salle school colors
DLSU	FEU school colors	UP school colors	NU school colors	Adamson school colors	UE school colors	Ateneo school colors	UST school colors	FEU school colors	UST school colors	UP school colors	Adamson school colors	UE school colors	Ateneo school colors	NU school colors
FEU	La Salle school colors	UE school colors	Ateneo school colors	UST school colors	UP school colors	Adamson school colors	NU school colors	La Salle school colors	UE school colors	Ateneo school colors	NU school colors	UST school colors	UP school colors	Adamson school colors
NU	Ateneo school colors	Adamson school colors	La Salle school colors	UE school colors	UST school colors	FEU school colors	UP school colors	Adamson school colors	Ateneo school colors	UE school colors	FEU school colors	UP school colors	UST school colors	La Salle school colors
UE	UP school colors	FEU school colors	NU school colors	UST school colors	La Salle school colors	Ateneo school colors	Adamson school colors	UST school colors	FEU school colors	NU school colors	UP school colors	La Salle school colors	Ateneo school colors	Adamson school colors
UP	UE school colors	La Salle school colors	Ateneo school colors	Adamson school colors	FEU school colors	UST school colors	NU school colors	Ateneo school colors	Adamson school colors	La Salle school colors	UE school colors	NU school colors	FEU school colors	UST school colors
UST	Adamson school colors	Ateneo school colors	FEU school colors	UE school colors	NU school colors	UP school colors	La Salle school colors	UE school colors	La Salle school colors	Adamson school colors	Ateneo school colors	FEU school colors	NU school colors	UP school colors

Source: ABS-CBN Sports
= Win; = Loss

==== Scores ====
Results to the right and top of the gray cells are first round games, those to the left and below are second round games.

Team	AdU	ADMU	DLSU	FEU	NU	UE	UP	UST
Adamson		0–3	0–3	3–2	1–3	3–0	1–3	3–2
Ateneo	3–0		0–3ɪ	3–0	3–0	3–0	3–0	3–1
La Salle	3–0	2–3ɪ		3–0	1–3	3–0	3–1	0–3ɪ
FEU	3–1	0–3	2–3		3–0	3–1	3–2	3–1
NU	3–0	0–3	1–3	2–3		3–0	0–3	2–3
UE	3–0	0–3	0–3	0–3	0–3		0–3	0–3
UP	3–0	3–1	1–3	1–3	0–3	3–0		3–1
UST	3–2	0–3	0–3ɪ	1–3	2–3	3–0	1–3	

Source: ABS-CBN Sports
Legend: Blue = left column team win; Red = top row team win.

=== Playoffs ===
Semifinals (Nos. 1 & 2 have twice-to-beat advantage)
1	Ateneo	3
4	UP	0
2	La Salle	2	3
3	FEU	3	0

Finals (Best-of-three series)
1	Ateneo	0	3	1
2	La Salle	3	2	3

=== Semifinals ===
ADMU vs UP ADMU with twice-to-beat advantage.
Elimination round results:

- (Feb 14) ADMU def. UP 3–0 • 25–19, 25–21, 25–21
- (Mar 06) UP def. ADMU 3–1 • 19–25, 25–22, 25–17, 25–22

April 16; 04:00 PM (UTC +8:00)	Ateneo Lady Eagles	3–0	UP Lady Maroons	MOA Arena, Pasay
April 16; 04:00 PM (UTC +8:00)	(25–19, 25–16, 25–21); Report			MOA Arena, Pasay

DLSU vs FEU DLSU with twice-to-beat advantage.
Elimination round results:

- (Feb 03) DLSU def. FEU 3–0 • 29–27, 25–23, 25–20
- (Mar 05) DLSU def. FEU 3–2 • 25–14, 25–9, 22–25, 19–25, 15–7

April 17; 04:00 PM (UTC +8:00)	De La Salle Lady Archers	2–3	FEU Lady Tamaraws	MOA Arena, Pasay
April 17; 04:00 PM (UTC +8:00)	(25–15, 25–23, 23–25, 21–25, 14–16); Report			MOA Arena, Pasay

April 20; 04:00 PM (UTC +8:00)	De La Salle Lady Archers	3–0	FEU Lady Tamaraws	MOA Arena, Pasay
April 20; 04:00 PM (UTC +8:00)	(25–15, 27–25, 25–21); Report			MOA Arena, Pasay

=== Finals ===
ADMU vs DLSU Best–of–three series
Elimination round results:

- (Feb 27) DLSU def. ADMU 3–0 • 25–22, 25–14, 25–18
- (Apr 10) ADMU def. DLSU 3–2 • 21–25, 25–22, 25–16, 21–25, 15–5

April 23; 16:00 (UTC +8:00)	Ateneo Lady Eagles	0–3	De La Salle Lady Archers	Smart Araneta Coliseum, Quezon City; Attendance: 19,921
April 23; 16:00 (UTC +8:00)	(22–25, 22–25, 21–25); Report			Smart Araneta Coliseum, Quezon City; Attendance: 19,921

April 27; 16:00 (UTC +8:00)	Ateneo Lady Eagles	3–2	De La Salle Lady Archers	MOA Arena, Pasay; Attendance: 20,125
April 27; 16:00 (UTC +8:00)	(18–25, 26–28, 25–17, 25–16, 15–11); Report			MOA Arena, Pasay; Attendance: 20,125

April 30; 15:00 (UTC +8:00)	Ateneo Lady Eagles	1–3	De La Salle Lady Archers	Smart Araneta Coliseum, Quezon City; Attendance: 22,848
April 30; 15:00 (UTC +8:00)	(25–19, 21–25, 16–25, 16–25); Report			Smart Araneta Coliseum, Quezon City; Attendance: 22,848

=== Broadcast notes ===
Game	Play-by-play	Analyst	Courtside Reporters	Upfront at the UAAP Hosts
Finals Game 1	Boom Gonzalez	Ian Laurel	Laura Lehmann and Jeanine Tsoi	Bea Daez, Natasha Alquiros and Justin Quirino
Finals Game 2	Boom Gonzalez	Mozzy Ravena	Laura Lehmann and Jeanine Tsoi	--No Upfront due to Awarding Ceremony--
Finals Game 3	Boom Gonzalez	Ian Laurel	Laura Lehmann and Jeanine Tsoi	Janeena Chan, Nathasha Alquiros, Addie Manzano, Richard Juan and Justin Quirino

Awarding ceremony hosts: TJ Manotoc and Janeena Chan

=== Awards ===
UAAP Season 78 women's volleyball champions
De La Salle Lady Archers
Ninth title

- Most valuable player (Season): Alyssa Valdez (Ateneo Lady Eagles)
- Most valuable player (Finals): Kim Kianna Dy (De La Salle Lady Archers)
- Rookie of the Year: Isa Molde (UP Lady Maroons)
- Best scorer: Alyssa Valdez (Ateneo Lady Eagles)
- Best attacker: Jaja Santiago (NU Lady Bulldogs)
- Best blocker: Mary Joy Baron (De La Salle Lady Archers)
- Best server: Alyssa Valdez (Ateneo Lady Eagles)
- Best digger: Dawn Macandili (De La Salle Lady Archers)
- Best setter: Kim Fajardo (De La Salle Lady Archers)
- Best receiver: Dawn Macandili (De La Salle Lady Archers)

==== Special awards ====
- Fudgee Barr O-Barr Sa Galing Player of the Season: Alyssa Valdez (Ateneo Lady Eagles)
- Manulife Up and Coming Player of the Season: Isa Molde (UP Lady Maroons)

=== Players of the Week ===
Week	Player	Ref.
January 31–February 7	Alyssa Valdez (Ateneo)	
February 10–14	Jaja Santiago (NU)	
February 17–21	Sisi Rondina (UST)	
February 24–28	Kim Fajardo (La Salle)	
March 2–6	Isa Molde (UP)	
March 9–13	Alyssa Valdez (Ateneo)	
March 16–20	Jhoana Maraguinot (Ateneo)	
March 30–April 3	Bernadeth Pons (FEU)	
April 6–April 10	Alyssa Valdez (Ateneo)	

=== Coaching changes ===
- Adamson Falcons: Sherwin Meneses has resigned as Head Coach of the team due to a conflict between the coaching staff and team sponsor Akari Lights, during the 2nd elimination round. Adamson Falcons Men's Volleyball team head coach Domingo Custodio was assigned as the interim head coach of the women's team until the season ends.

=== Injuries ===
- Ateneo Lady Eagles: Sophomore middle blocker Maddie Madayag suffers her season-ending right knee Anterior cruciate ligament (ACL) injury during a team practice session on March 15, 2016. She will undertake a surgery after Holy Week.
- DLSU Lady Spikers: Graduating open hitter Cydthealee Demecillo suffers a knee sprain after their game against UP Fighting Maroons on March 16, 2016. Demecillo rested for two weeks to further heal her knee.

== Boys' tournament ==
=== Elimination round ===
==== Team standings ====
Pos	Team	Pld	W	L	PCT	GB	Qualification
1	NUNS Bullpups	12	12	0	1.000	—	Advance to the Finals
2	UE Junior Red Warriors	12	10	2	.833	2	Twice-to-beat in stepladder round 2
3	FEU–D Baby Tamaraws	12	8	4	.667	4	Stepladder round 1
4	Ateneo Blue Eaglets	12	5	7	.417 (Note: Fourth-seed playoff: Ateneo wins over UST)	7	Stepladder round 1
5	UST Tiger Cubs	12	5	7	.417	7	Fourth-seed playoff
6	Zobel Junior Archers	12	2	10	.167	10	
7	UPIS Junior Fighting Maroons (H)	12	0	12	.000	12	

Source: ABS-CBN Sports
Rules for classification: 1) winning percentage; 2) if tied for #2 or #4, one-game playoff; 3) head-to-head record; 4) head-to-head point differential; 5) overall point differential
(H) Hosts

==== Match-up results ====
	Round 1						Round 2					
Team ╲ Game	1	2	3	4	5	6	7	8	9	10	11	12
AdMU	UP school colors	UST school colors	FEU school colors	UE school colors	La Salle school colors	NU school colors	UST school colors	La Salle school colors				
DLSU	UST school colors	FEU school colors	UE school colors	NU school colors	Ateneo school colors	UP school colors	FEU school colors	Ateneo school colors	UST school colors	UE school colors	NU school colors	UP school colors
FEU	NU school colors	La Salle school colors	UP school colors	Ateneo school colors	UST school colors	UE school colors	La Salle school colors	NU school colors				
NU	FEU school colors	UE school colors	La Salle school colors	UP school colors	UST school colors	Ateneo school colors	FEU school colors	UP school colors	La Salle school colors	UST school colors	Ateneo school colors	UE school colors
UE	NU school colors	La Salle school colors	UP school colors	Ateneo school colors	UST school colors	FEU school colors	UP school colors	UST school colors	La Salle school colors	Ateneo school colors	FEU school colors	NU school colors
UP	Ateneo school colors	UST school colors	FEU school colors	UE school colors	NU school colors	La Salle school colors	UE school colors	NU school colors	UST school colors	FEU school colors	La Salle school colors	Ateneo school colors
UST	La Salle school colors	UP school colors	Ateneo school colors	FEU school colors	UE school colors	NU school colors	Ateneo school colors	UE school colors	NU school colors	UP school colors	La Salle school colors	FEU school colors

Source: ABS-CBN Sports
= Win; = Loss

=== Awards ===
UAAP Season 78 boys' volleyball champions
NUNS Bullpups
First title

- Most valuable player (Season): Shaun Christopher Ledesma (UE Junior Red Warriors)
- Most valuable player (Finals): Raymart Reyes (NUNS Bullpups)
- Rookie of the Year: Lawrence Paladin (DLSZ Junior Archers)
- Best scorer: Shaun Christopher Ledesma (UE Junior Red Warriors)
- Best attacker: Noel Kampton (NUNS Bullpups)
- Best blocker: Billie Jean Anima (NUNS Bullpups)
- Best receiver: Marc Caballero (UE Junior Red Warriors)
- Best digger: Eduardo Manuel (UST Tiger Cubs)
- Best setter: Ralph Imperial (UE Junior Red Warriors)

== Girls' tournament ==
=== Elimination round ===
==== Team standings ====
Pos	Team	Pld	W	L	PCT	GB	Qualification
1	NUNS Lady Bullpups	12	11	1	.917	—	Twice-to-beat in the semifinals
2	UST Junior Tigresses	12	10	2	.833	1	Twice-to-beat in the semifinals
3	Zobel Junior Lady Archers	12	7	5	.583	4	Twice-to-win in the semifinals
4	UE Junior Lady Warriors	11	5	6	.455	5.5	Twice-to-win in the semifinals
5	FEU–D Lady Baby Tamaraws	11	4	7	.364	6.5	
6	Adamson Lady Baby Falcons	12	4	8	.333	7	
7	UPIS Junior Lady Maroons (H)	12	0	12	.000	11	

Source: ABS-CBN Sports
Rules for classification: 1) winning percentage; 2) if tied for #2 or #4, one-game playoff; 3) head-to-head record; 4) head-to-head point differential; 5) overall point differential
(H) Hosts

==== Match-up results ====
	Round 1						Round 2					
Team ╲ Game	1	2	3	4	5	6	7	8	9	10	11	12
AdU	UE school colors	UP school colors	UST school colors	FEU school colors	NU school colors	La Salle school colors	UE school colors	FEU school colors	NU school colors	La Salle school colors	UP school colors	UST school colors
DLSU	FEU school colors	NU school colors	UE school colors	UP school colors	UST school colors	Adamson school colors	FEU school colors	NU school colors	Adamson school colors	UP school colors	UST school colors	UE school colors
FEU	La Salle school colors	UE school colors	UP school colors	Adamson school colors	UST school colors	NU school colors	La Salle school colors	Adamson school colors	UP school colors	UST school colors	UE school colors	NU school colors
NU	La Salle school colors	UE school colors	UP school colors	UST school colors	Adamson school colors	FEU school colors	La Salle school colors	Adamson school colors	UP school colors	UST school colors	UE school colors	FEU school colors
UE	Adamson school colors	FEU school colors	NU school colors	La Salle school colors	UST school colors	UP school colors	Adamson school colors	UP school colors	UST school colors	FEU school colors	NU school colors	La Salle school colors
UP	UST school colors	Adamson school colors	FEU school colors	NU school colors	La Salle school colors	UE school colors	UST school colors	UE school colors	FEU school colors	NU school colors	La Salle school colors	Adamson school colors
UST	UP school colors	Adamson school colors	NU school colors	FEU school colors	La Salle school colors	UE school colors	UP school colors	UE school colors	NU school colors	FEU school colors	La Salle school colors	Adamson school colors

Source: ABS-CBN Sports
= Win; = Loss

=== Awards ===
UAAP Season 78 girls' volleyball champions
NUNS Lady Bullpups
Second title, second consecutive title

- Most valuable player (Season): Ejiya Laure (UST Junior Tigresses)
- Most valuable player (Finals): Faith Nisperos (NUNS Lady Bullpups)
- Rookie of the Year: Thea Gagate (NUNS Lady Bullpups)
- Best scorer: Jules Samonte (Zobel Junior Lady Archers)
- Best attacker: Faith Nisperos (NUNS Lady Bullpups)
- Best blocker: Sheena Toring (NUNS Lady Bullpups)
- Best receiver: Bernadett Pepito (UST Junior Tigresses)
- Best digger: Bela Peralta (Zobel Junior Lady Archers)
- Best setter: Joyme Cagande (NUNS Lady Bullpups)

== Overall championship points ==
=== Seniors' division ===
Team	Men	Women	Total
Ateneo Blue Eagles	15	12	27
De La Salle Green Archers	4	15	19
NU Bulldogs	12	6	18
FEU Tamaraws	6	10	16
UP Fighting Maroons	8	8	16
Adamson Soaring Falcons	10	2	12
UST Growling Tigers	2	4	6
UE Red Warriors	1	1	2

=== Juniors' division ===
Team	Boys'	Girls'	Points
NUNS Bullpups	15	15	30
UE Junior Red Warriors	12	8	20
UST Tiger Cubs	6	12	18
FEU–D Baby Tamaraws	10	6	16
Zobel Junior Archers	4	10	14
Ateneo Blue Eaglets	8	-	8
Adamson Baby Falcons	-	4	4
UPIS Junior Fighting Maroons	2	2	4

Pts.	Ranking
15	Champion
12	2nd
10	3rd
8	4th
6	5th
4	6th
2	7th
1	8th
—	Did not join
WD	Withdrew

In case of a tie, the team with the higher position in any tournament is ranked higher. If both are still tied, they are listed by alphabetical order.

How rankings are determined:

- Ranks 5th to 8th determined by elimination round standings.
- Loser of the #1 vs #4 semifinal match-up is ranked 4th
- Loser of the #2 vs #3 semifinal match-up is ranked 3rd
- Loser of the finals is ranked 2nd
- Champion is ranked 1st

== See also ==
- UAAP Season 78
- NCAA Season 91 volleyball tournaments

Preceded by Season 77 (2014–15)	UAAP volleyball tournaments Season 78 (2015–16)	Succeeded by Season 79 (2016–17)
