= UAAP Season 79 volleyball tournaments =

2017 Philippine volleyball season

UAAP Season 79 Volleyball
- Host school: University of Santo Tomas
Men's Finals	G1	G2	Wins
Ateneo Blue Eagles	3	3	2
NU Bulldogs	2	2	0
- Duration: May 2–6, 2017
- Arena(s): Araneta Coliseum
- Finals MVP: Antony Paul Koyfman
- Winning coach: Oliver Almadro
- Semifinalists: FEU Tamaraws; UST Growling Tigers
- TV network(s): ABS-CBN Sports+Action, ABS-CBN Sports+Action HD, The Filipino Channel
Women's Finals	G1	G2	Wins
Ateneo Lady Eagles	1	2	0
De La Salle Lady Archers	3	3	2
- Duration: May 2–6, 2017
- Arena(s): Araneta Coliseum
- Finals MVP: Desiree Wynea Cheng
- Winning coach: Ramil de Jesus
- Semifinalists: UST Growling Tigresses; FEU Lady Tamaraws
- TV network(s): ABS-CBN, ABS-CBN HD, ABS-CBN Sports+Action, ABS-CBN Sports+Action HD, The Filipino Channel

The UAAP Season 79 volleyball tournaments started on February 4, 2017 at the Smart Araneta Coliseum in Quezon City, with the opening games of the men and women's senior volleyball tourneys, participated by 8 regular UAAP members. Aside from the Smart Araneta Coliseum, the games will also be held at the Filoil Flying V Centre, San Juan City and the Mall of Asia Arena, Pasay. The tournament host is the University of Santo Tomas, the season's host school.

Rustico "Otie" Camangian will serve as the commissioner of the tournament.

The Ateneo Blue Eagles completed a historic 16-game season sweep earning their 3rd consecutive title against the NU Bulldogs whom they tamed for 12 straight head-to-head matchups since Season 77. The De La Salle University Lady Spikers won their tenth title, defeating the Ateneo Lady Eagles in the finals.

== Men's tournament ==
=== Season's team line-up ===
Adamson Soaring Falcons
No.	Name	Position
1	Karli Nico Ramirez	S
2	Dave Pletado	
3	Leo Miranda	
4	Jerome Sarmiento	
5	Michael Sudaria (c)	
6	Carlo Jimenez	
7	John Philip Yude	
8	Paolo Pablico	
9	Jelex Jay Mendiolla	L
10	Mark Angelo Alvarez	
11	Royce Bello	
12	Rence Melgar	L
13	George Labang Jr.	
15	Lenard Amburgo	
	Domingo Custodio	HC

Ateneo Blue Eagles
No.	Name	Position
1	Lawrence Gil R. Magadia	S
2	Karl Irvin T. Baysa (c)	OH
3	Ron Adrian D. Medalla	OP
4	Joshua Alexis Miguel C. Villanueva	MB
5	Jasper Rodney Tan	MB
6	Antony Paul Koyfman	OP
10	Paulo Lorenzo G. Trinidad	OP
11	Rex Emmanuel A. Intal	MB
12	Chumason Celestine M. Njigha	MB
13	Manuel D. Sumanguid III	L
14	Esmilzo Joner T. Polvorosa	S
15	Marck Jesus P. Espejo	OH
16	Gian Carlo A. Glorioso	MB
18	Ishmael John T. Rivera	OH
	OLIVER ALLAN ALMADRO	HC

De La Salle Green Archers
No.	Name	Position
1	Rafael Macaspac	
2	Rafael Del Pilar	
3	Raymark Woo	
5	John David Delos Reyes	
6	Jopet Movido	
7	Cris Dumago	
8	Arjay Onia	
9	Marco Wayne	
10	Jose Joshua	
11	Reuel Asia	
14	Geraint Bacon	
15	Zosimo Maravilla	
17	Geuel Asia (c)	
18	Levin Dimayuga	
	Ernesto Pamillar	HC

FEU Tamaraws
No.	Name	Position
1	Redjohn Paler	
2	Richard Solis (c)	
3	Kris Sian Silang	S
4	Owen Jaime Suarez	
5	Rico Marius Mamerto	L
6	Ronchelle Lee Villegas	
7	Jude Garcia	
8	John Paul Bugaoan	MB
9	Christian Mark Detablan	
10	Raymond Bautista	
12	John Paul Salabsab	
14	Franco Camcam Jr.	
15	Peter Quiel	
16	Gregorio Dolor	
	Reynaldo Diaz	HC

NU Bulldogs
No.	Name	Position
1	Bryan Bagunas	OH
2	Jann Paolo Ancheta	S
3	Kim Harold Dayandante	S
4	John Vincent Ogoc	
5	Krisvan Ponti	MB
6	Banjo Mondero	
8	Jann Mariano Sumagui	L
9	James Martin Natividad	OH
10	Ismail Fauzi	OH
12	Francis Philip Saura (c)	MB
15	Ricky Marcos	L
16	Ruben Baysac	
17	Kim Malabunga	MB
18	Madzian Gampong	OPP
	Dante Alinsunurin	HC

UE Red Warriors
No.	Name	Position
1	Clifford Inoferio	
3	Samuel Lelic Jr.	
4	Rasheed Hakeem Al-Bandar	
5	Kim Adriano	
6	Alven Aljas	
7	Adrian Rafael Imperial	S
8	Noel Alba	
9	Vincent Magdaong	
11	Edward Camposano (c)	OH
12	Geric Rodmar Ortega	
13	Danilo Ernacio Jr.	L
14	Johnarc Espaldon	
17	Maric Glyne Balquiedra	L
	Ruel Pascual	HC

UP Fighting Maroons
No.	Name	Position
1	Jerahmeal Baldelovar	
3	Niccolo Consuelo	
4	John Mark Castillo	
5	Matthew Gohoc	
6	Jerry Earl San Pedro	
7	John Miguel Nasol	
9	John Carlo Madrigalejos	
10	Wendel Miguel (c)	
11	Alfred Gerard Valbuena	
12	John Mark Millete	
13	Wilhelm Victor Luna	
14	Lorenzo Trinidad	
15	Charles Drake Acuna	
18	Gian Kyle San Pascual	
	Rodrigo Palmero	HC

UST Growling Tigers
No.	Name	Position
2	Vyxen Vaughn Valenzuela	
3	Arnold Bautista Jr. (c)	
4	Jerald David Tajanlangit	L
5	John Michael Millado	
7	Jayvee Sumagaysay	MB
8	Melchizedek Samonte	
9	Timothy James Tajanlangit	S
10	Manuel Andrei Medina	
11	Justin Raymund Francisco	L
14	Juren Jireh Buro	
15	Isaiah Lorenzo Icalina	
16	Tyrone Jan Carodan	
17	Mark Jayson Pangan	
18	Jerico Jose	
	Arthur "Odjie" Mamon	HC

Legend
S	Setter
MB	Middle Blocker
OH	Outside Hitter
OP	Opposite Hitter
L	Libero
(c)	Team Captain
HC	Head coach

=== Elimination round ===
==== Team standings ====
Pos	Team	Pld	W	L	Pts	SW	SL	SR	SPW	SPL	SPR	Qualification
1	Ateneo Blue Eagles	14	14	0	42	42	3	14.000	1126	849	1.326	Advance to the Finals
2	NU Bulldogs	14	12	2	34	37	14	2.643	1206	1063	1.135	Twice-to-beat in stepladder round 2
3	FEU Tamaraws	14	8	6	24	28	22	1.273	1119	1065	1.051	Stepladder round 1
4	UST Growling Tigers (H)	14	6	8	14	22	35	0.629	1179	1292	0.913	Stepladder round 1
5	Adamson Soaring Falcons	14	5	9	18 (Note: Head-to-head record: Adamson 2–2, La Salle 2–2, UP 2–2; Adamson 18 pts, La Salle 17 pts, UP 15 pts)	25	31	0.806	1235	1275	0.969	
6	De La Salle Green Archers	14	5	9	17	23	31	0.742	1195	1217	0.982	
7	UP Fighting Maroons	14	5	9	15	22	32	0.688	1152	1222	0.943	
8	UE Red Warriors	14	1	13	4	10	41	0.244	987	1216	0.812	

Source: ABS-CBN Sports
Rules for classification: 1) number of wins; 2) if tied for #2 or #4, one-game playoff; 3) match points; 4) sets ratio; 5) points ratio; 6) head-to-head record ratio; 6) points ratio
(H) Host

==== Match-up results ====
	Round 1							Round 2						
Team ╲ Game	1	2	3	4	5	6	7	8	9	10	11	12	13	14
AdU	UP school colors	FEU school colors	NU school colors	Ateneo school colors	La Salle school colors	UST school colors	UE school colors	UE school colors	NU school colors	La Salle school colors	Ateneo school colors	FEU school colors	UST school colors	UP school colors
AdMU	UST school colors	NU school colors	FEU school colors	Adamson school colors	UE school colors	UP school colors	La Salle school colors	FEU school colors	UP school colors	UST school colors	Adamson school colors	UE school colors	La Salle school colors	NU school colors
DLSU	FEU school colors	UST school colors	UP school colors	NU school colors	Adamson school colors	UE school colors	Ateneo school colors	UP school colors	FEU school colors	Adamson school colors	NU school colors	UST school colors	Ateneo school colors	UE school colors
FEU	La Salle school colors	Adamson school colors	Ateneo school colors	UE school colors	NU school colors	UP school colors	UST school colors	Ateneo school colors	La Salle school colors	NU school colors	UE school colors	Adamson school colors	UP school colors	UST school colors
NU	UE school colors	Ateneo school colors	Adamson school colors	La Salle school colors	FEU school colors	UST school colors	UP school colors	UST school colors	Adamson school colors	FEU school colors	La Salle school colors	UP school colors	UE school colors	Ateneo school colors
UE	NU school colors	UP school colors	UST school colors	FEU school colors	Ateneo school colors	La Salle school colors	Adamson school colors	Adamson school colors	UST school colors	UP school colors	FEU school colors	Ateneo school colors	NU school colors	La Salle school colors
UP	Adamson school colors	UE school colors	La Salle school colors	UST school colors	Ateneo school colors	FEU school colors	NU school colors	La Salle school colors	Ateneo school colors	UE school colors	UST school colors	NU school colors	FEU school colors	Adamson school colors
UST	Ateneo school colors	La Salle school colors	UE school colors	UP school colors	Adamson school colors	NU school colors	FEU school colors	NU school colors	UE school colors	Ateneo school colors	UP school colors	La Salle school colors	Adamson school colors	FEU school colors

= Win; = Loss

==== Game results ====
Team	AdU	ADMU	DLSU	FEU	NU	UE	UP	UST
Adamson		0–3	3–1	2–3	1–3	3–0	2–3	2–3
Ateneo	3–0		3–0	3–0	3–1	3–0	3–0	3–0
La Salle	3–1	0–3		0–3	1–3	3–1	3–0	2–3
FEU	2–3	0–3	2–3		0–3	3–2	3–0	3–0
NU	3–0	0–3	3–2	3–0		3–0	3–1	3–0
UE	3–2	0–3	0–3	0–3	0–3		1–3	2–3
UP	1–3	1–3	3–0	0–3	2–3	3–0		3–2
UST	0–3	1–3	3–2	0–3	1–3	3–1	3–2	

Legend: Blue = left column team win; Red = top row team win.

=== Playoffs ===
Stepladder round 1 (One-game playoff)
3	FEU	3
4	UST	0

Stepladder round 2 (No. 2 has twice-to-beat advantage)
2	NU	1	3
3	FEU	3	2

Finals (Best-of-three series)
1	Ateneo	3	3
2	NU	2	2

=== First round ===
FEU vs UST One-game playoff.
Elimination round results:

- (Mar 04) FEU def. UST 3–0 • 25–19, 25–23, 25–22
- (Apr 08) FEU def. UST 3–0 • 25–23, 25–18, 25–18

Apr 19; 02:00 PM (UTC +8:00)	UST Growling Tigers	0–3	FEU Tamaraws	Filoil Flying V Centre, San Juan City
Apr 19; 02:00 PM (UTC +8:00)	(22–25, 25–27, 18–25); P2			Filoil Flying V Centre, San Juan City

=== Semifinals ===
NU vs FEU NU with twice-to-beat advantage.
Elimination round results:

- (Feb 25) NU def. FEU 3–0 • 25–20, 25–22, 25–23
- (Mar 19) NU def. FEU 3–0 • 25–21, 25–23, 26–24

Apr 23; 12:00 NN (UTC +8:00)	NU Bulldogs	1–3	FEU Tamaraws	Mall of Asia Arena, Pasay
Apr 23; 12:00 NN (UTC +8:00)	(25–22, 24–26, 26–28, 17–25); P2			Mall of Asia Arena, Pasay

Apr 26; 02:00 PM (UTC +8:00)	NU Bulldogs	3–2	FEU Tamaraws	Filoil Flying V Centre, San Juan City
Apr 26; 02:00 PM (UTC +8:00)	(23–25, 25–20, 15–25, 25–21, 15–12); P2			Filoil Flying V Centre, San Juan City

=== Finals ===
ADMU vs NU Best-of-three series.
Elimination round results:

- (Feb 08) ADMU def. NU 3–1 • 27–25, 25–23, 23–25, 25–16
- (Apr 08) ADMU def. NU 3–0 • 25–17, 25–21, 25–16

May 02; 12:00 NN (UTC +8:00)	Ateneo Blue Eagles	3–2	NU Bulldogs	Mall of Asia Arena, Pasay
May 02; 12:00 NN (UTC +8:00)	(25–22, 21–25, 22–25, 25–18, 15–13); P2			Mall of Asia Arena, Pasay

May 06; 12:00 NN (UTC +8:00)	Ateneo Blue Eagles	3–2	NU Bulldogs	Smart Araneta Coliseum, Quezon City
May 06; 12:00 NN (UTC +8:00)	(16–25, 25–16, 20–25, 25–18, 15–13); P2			Smart Araneta Coliseum, Quezon City

=== Awards ===
UAAP Season 79 men's volleyball champions
Ateneo Blue Eagles
Third title, third consecutive title

- Most valuable player (Season): Marck Jesus Espejo (Ateneo Blue Eagles)
- Most valuable player (Finals): Antony Paul Koyfman (Ateneo Blue Eagles)
- Rookie of the Year: Chumason Celestine Njigha (Ateneo Blue Eagles)
- Best scorer: Marck Jesus Espejo (Ateneo Blue Eagles)
- Best attacker: Marck Jesus Espejo (Ateneo Blue Eagles)
- Best blocker: John Paul Bugaoan (FEU Tamaraws)
- Best setter: Ezmilzo Joner Polvorosa (Ateneo Blue Eagles)
- Best server: Bryan Bagunas (NU Bulldogs)
- Best receiver: Rikko Marius Marmeto (FEU Tamaraws)
- Best digger: Ricky Marcos (NU Bulldogs)

== Women's tournament ==
=== Line-ups ===
Adamson Lady Falcons
No.	Name	Position
1	MATIAS, Lynne Robyn	S
3	FLORA, Bernadette	OH / OP
4	DAHAB, Zonxie	MB
5	DACORON, Mary Joy	MB
6	CAOLE, Chumcee Ann	S
7	TEMPIATURA, Jellie	L
8	GALANZA, Jessica Margarett (c)	OH
9	WANTA, Ciarnelle Mikaela	OH
10	MOMO, Ronjean	OH
12	UY, Chrislyn	OH
14	PONCE, Tonnie Rose	L
15	JOAQUIN, Maria Fatima	MB
18	MOHAMMAD, Anwarlyn	L / S
	AIRESS PADDA	HC

Ateneo Lady Eagles
No.	Name	Position
3	MORENTE, Michelle Kathereen	OP
4	LO, Jennelle Marie	L
5	GASTON, Pauline Marie Monique	OH / MB
6	LAVITORIA, Jamie Isabelle	S
7	TAN, Ma. Gizelle Jessica	L
8	SAMONTE, Julianne Marie	MB / OP
9	GOPICO, Ana Laureen	OH / MB
10	TOLENTINO, Katrina Mae	OH
11	WONG, Ma. Deanna Izabella	S / L
12	MORADO, Julia Melissa (c)	S
14	DE LEON, Isabel Beatriz	MB
15	MARAGUINOT, Jhoana Louisse	OH
17	MADAYAG, Madeleine Yrenea	MB
18	GEQUILLANA, Kassandra Miren	OH / OP
	ANUSORN BUNDIT	HC

De La Salle Lady Spikers
No.	Name	Position
1	BARROGA, Ezra Gyra	OP
2	CHENG, Desiree Wynea	OH
4	LAYUG, Arriane Mae	OH
5	MACANDILI, Dawn Nicole	L
6	COBB, Michelle Monique	S
7	LUNA, May	OH
9	FAJARDO, Kim (c)	S
10	BARON, Mary Joy	MB
11	DY, Kim Kianna	OP
12	SAGA, Carmel June	L
13	OGUNSANYA, Aduke Christine	MB
15	TIAMZON, Ernestine Grace	OH
16	IPAC, Norielle	MB
17	TIU, Princess Justine	OH
	RAMIL DE JESUS	HC

FEU Lady Tamaraws
No.	Name	Position
1	HERNANDEZ, Carlota	OH
2	PONS, Bernadeth	OH
4	GUINO-O, Heather Anne	OH / OP
5	DUREMDES, Ria Beatriz Glenell	L
7	REBLEZA, Justine Andrea	OH
8	CAYUNA, Maria Angelica	S / OP
9	PALMA, Mary Remy Joy (c)	MB
11	ATIENZA, Kyla Llana	L
12	NEGRITO, Kyle Angela	S
13	VILLAREAL, Jeanette Virginia	MB
14	CARANDANG, Czarina Grace	MB
15	MALABANAN, Jerrili	MB / OH
16	BASAS, Toni Rose	OP
17	AGUDO, Ivanna	OH
	CESAEL DELOS SANTOS	HC

NU Lady Bulldogs
No.	Name	Position
3	SANTIAGO, Alyja Daphne (c)	MB / OPP
4	NABOR, Jasmine	S
5	SATO, Risa	MB
6	DOROMAL, Roma Joy	OP
7	ABERIN, Larnie	S
8	CHAVEZ, Joni Anne Kamille	L
9	URDAS, Aiko Sweet	OH
11	DORIA, Roselyn	MB
13	VALDEZ, Gayle Rose	L
14	SINGH, Jorelle	OH
15	PARAN, Audrey Kathryn	OH
	Roger Gorayeb	HC

UE Lady Warriors
No.	Name	Position
1	ABIL, Judith	OH
2	CLAVANO, Lhara Maye	OH
3	GABARDA, Mariela	L
4	MENDREZ, Mary Anne	MB
5	ARADO, Kathleen Faith	L
6	CATINDIG, Juliet	OH
7	RODRIGUEZ, Seth Marione	MB
8	OLARVE, Zhilfa	OH
9	STA MARIA, Katrina	OP
11	ADORADOR, Ma. Shaya (c)	OH
12	BALITON, Roselle	S
14	BENDONG, Laizah Ann	S
15	ALCAYDE, Jasmine Gayle	MB
16	DACAYMAT, Angelica	OH
	FRANCIS VICENTE	HC

UP Lady Maroons
No.	Name	Position
2	BASARTE, Mae Angeli	S
3	LAYUG, Maristela Genn	MB
6	SANDOVAL, Caryl	OH
8	BERSOLA, Katherine Adrielle	MB
9	RAMOS, Jessma Clarice	MB
10	MOLDE, Maria Lina Isabel	OH
11	BUITRE, Marian Alisa	OP
12	GAISER, Princess Ira	L
13	DOROG, Justine	OH / L
14	GANNABAN, Aieshalaine	MB
16	CAILING, Rose Mary	S
17	ESTRAÑERO, Maria Arielle (c)	S
18	CARLOS, Diana Mae	MB
19	TIAMZON, Nicole Anne	OH
99	BARCOMA, Jusa	MB
	JERRY YEE	HC

UST Growling Tigresses
No.	Name	Position
2	RIVERA, Rica Jane	L
3	CORTEZ, Chlodia Eiriel Ysabella	MB/OP
4	VIRAY, Caitlin	OP
5	SANDOVAL, Carla	OH
6	LASTIMOSA, Pamela Tricia	OP/OH
7	BICAR, Alina Joyce	S
8	PACRES, Mary Dominique	OP
9	LAURE, Ennajie	OH
10	CABAÑOS, Alexine Danielle	S
11	RASMO, Patricia Kim	L
14	FRANCISCO, Christine Dianne	MB
16	RONDINA, Cherry Ann(c)	OH
17	PALEC, Shannen	MB
18	MENESES, Marivic Velaine	MB
	EMILIO REYES, JR.	HC

Legend
S	Setter
MB	Middle Blocker
OH	Outside Hitter
OP	Opposite Hitter
L	Libero
SS	Service Specialist
(c)	Team Captain
HC	Head coach

=== Elimination round ===
==== Team standings ====
Pos	Team	Pld	W	L	Pts	SW	SL	SR	SPW	SPL	SPR	Qualification
1	Ateneo Lady Eagles	14	12	2	35	39	12	3.250	1189	978	1.216	Twice-to-beat in the semifinals
2	De La Salle Lady Archers	14	11	3	33	35	11	3.182	1103	893	1.235	Twice-to-beat in the semifinals
3	UST Growling Tigresses (H)	14	9	5	26	29	21	1.381	1154	1044	1.105	Twice-to-win in the semifinals
4	FEU Lady Tamaraws	14	8	6	26	30	21	1.429	1167	1061	1.100	Twice-to-win in the semifinals
5	UP Lady Maroons	14	7	7	22 (Note: Head-to-head record: UP 1–1 NU; UP +2)	24	24	1.000	1050	1034	1.015	
6	NU Lady Bulldogs	14	7	7	20	27	28	0.964	1166	1211	0.963	
7	UE Lady Warriors	14	1	13	3 (Note: Head-to-head record: UE 1–1 Adamson; UE: better sets ratio)	7	40	0.175	862	1143	0.754	
8	Adamson Lady Falcons	14	1	13	3	5	39	0.128	739	1066	0.693	

Source: ABS-CBN Sports
Rules for classification: 1) number of wins; 2) if tied for #2 or #4, one-game playoff; 3) match points; 4) sets ratio; 5) points ratio; 6) head-to-head record
(H) Host

==== Match-up results ====
	Round 1							Round 2						
Team ╲ Game	1	2	3	4	5	6	7	8	9	10	11	12	13	14
AdU	UP school colors	FEU school colors	NU school colors	Ateneo school colors	La Salle school colors	UST school colors	UE school colors	NU school colors	FEU school colors	UST school colors	UP school colors	Ateneo school colors	La Salle school colors	UE school colors
AdMU	UST school colors	NU school colors	FEU school colors	Adamson school colors	UE school colors	UP school colors	La Salle school colors	UP school colors	UST school colors	FEU school colors	NU school colors	Adamson school colors	UE school colors	La Salle school colors
DLSU	FEU school colors	UST school colors	UP school colors	NU school colors	Adamson school colors	UE school colors	Ateneo school colors	FEU school colors	NU school colors	UP school colors	UE school colors	UST school colors	Adamson school colors	Ateneo school colors
FEU	La Salle school colors	Adamson school colors	Ateneo school colors	UE school colors	NU school colors	UP school colors	UST school colors	La Salle school colors	Adamson school colors	Ateneo school colors	UST school colors	UE school colors	NU school colors	UP school colors
NU	UE school colors	Ateneo school colors	Adamson school colors	La Salle school colors	FEU school colors	UST school colors	UP school colors	Adamson school colors	La Salle school colors	UE school colors	Ateneo school colors	UP school colors	FEU school colors	UST school colors
UE	NU school colors	UP school colors	UST school colors	FEU school colors	Ateneo school colors	La Salle school colors	Adamson school colors	UST school colors	UP school colors	NU school colors	La Salle school colors	FEU school colors	Ateneo school colors	Adamson school colors
UP	Adamson school colors	UE school colors	La Salle school colors	UST school colors	Ateneo school colors	FEU school colors	NU school colors	Ateneo school colors	UE school colors	La Salle school colors	Adamson school colors	NU school colors	UST school colors	FEU school colors
UST	Ateneo school colors	La Salle school colors	UE school colors	UP school colors	Adamson school colors	NU school colors	FEU school colors	UE school colors	Ateneo school colors	Adamson school colors	FEU school colors	La Salle school colors	UP school colors	NU school colors

= Win; = Loss

==== Game results ====
Team	AdU	ADMU	DLSU	FEU	NU	UE	UP	UST
Adamson		0–3	0–3	0–3	0–3	1–3	0–3	0–3
Ateneo	3–0		3–1	3–2	1–3	3–0	3–0	3–0
La Salle	3–0	1–3		3–0	3–0	3–0	0–3	3–1
FEU	3–0	2–3	0–3		3–1	3–1	3–1	1–3
NU	3–0	3–2	1–3	0–3		3–1	3–2	1–3
UE	0–3	0–3	0–3	0–3	1–3		0–3	0–3
UP	3–0	0–3	0–3	0–3	3–1	3–1		3–1
UST	3–1	0–3	0–3	3–1	3–2	3–0	3–0	

Legend: Blue = left column team win; Red = top row team win.

=== Playoffs ===
Semifinals (Nos. 1 & 2 have twice-to-beat advantage)
1	Ateneo	3
4	FEU	1
2	La Salle	3
3	UST	1

Finals (Best-of-three series)
1	Ateneo	1	2
2	La Salle	3	3

=== Semifinals ===
Ateneo vs FEU Ateneo with twice-to-beat advantage.
Elimination round results:

- (Feb 12) ADMU def. FEU 3–2 • 25–19, 24–26, 19–25, 25–16, 15–11
- (Mar 18) ADMU def. FEU 3–2 • 25–20, 25–22, 17–25, 21–25, 15–8

Apr 23; 04:00 PM	Ateneo Lady Eagles	3–1	FEU Lady Tamaraws	Mall of Asia Arena, Pasay; Attendance: 10,200
Apr 23; 04:00 PM	(25–22, 25–10, 16–25, 26–24); P2			Mall of Asia Arena, Pasay; Attendance: 10,200

La Salle vs UST La Salle with twice-to-beat advantage.
Elimination round results:

- (Feb 11) DLSU def. UST 3–1 • 25–23, 16–25, 25–14, 25–22
- (Mar 29) DLSU def. UST 3–0 • 25–23, 25–22, 25–21

Apr 22; 04:00 PM	De La Salle Lady Archers	3–1	UST Growling Tigresses	Smart Araneta Coliseum, Quezon City
Apr 22; 04:00 PM	(25–14, 25–20, 24–26, 25–13)			Smart Araneta Coliseum, Quezon City

=== Finals ===
Ateneo vs La Salle Best-of-three series.
This is the sixth straight year that these two teams will face-off in the Finals, with the Lady Spikers winning three of the first five match-ups.

Elimination round results:

- (Mar 04) ADMU def. DLSU 3–1 • 26–24, 26–24, 21–25, 25–17
- (Apr 08) ADMU def. DLSU 3–1 • 12–25, 25–20, 25–21, 25–19

May 02; 04:00 PM (UTC +8:00)	Ateneo Lady Eagles	1–3	De La Salle Lady Archers	Smart Araneta Coliseum, Quezon City; Attendance: 13,468
May 02; 04:00 PM (UTC +8:00)	(25–21, 27–29, 22–25, 20–25); P2			Smart Araneta Coliseum, Quezon City; Attendance: 13,468

May 06; 04:00 PM (UTC +8:00)	Ateneo Lady Eagles	2–3	De La Salle Lady Archers	Smart Araneta Coliseum, Quezon City; Attendance: 20,860
May 06; 04:00 PM (UTC +8:00)	(25–19, 14–25, 25–18, 18–25, 10–15); P2			Smart Araneta Coliseum, Quezon City; Attendance: 20,860

=== Awards ===
UAAP Season 79 women's volleyball champions
De La Salle Lady Archers
Tenth title, second consecutive title

- Most valuable player (Season): Mary Joy Baron (De La Salle Lady Archers)
- Most valuable player (Finals): Desiree Wynea Cheng (De La Salle Lady Archers)
- Rookie of the Year: Julianne Marie Samonte (Ateneo Lady Eagles)
- Best scorer: Jaja Santiago (NU Lady Bulldogs)
- Best attacker: Jaja Santiago (NU Lady Bulldogs)
- Best blocker: Jaja Santiago (NU Lady Bulldogs)
- Best server: Kim Fajardo (De La Salle Lady Archers)
- Best digger: Kath Arado (UE Lady Warriors)
- Best setter: Kim Fajardo (De La Salle Lady Archers)
- Best receiver: Dawn Macandili (De La Salle Lady Archers)

=== Broadcast Notes ===
All games were aired on S+A Channel 23, and S+A HD Channel 166, Game 2 was also simulcast on ABS-CBN Channel 2 only. No Livestream due to Premier Volleyball League Games Live

Game	Play-by-play	Analyst	Courtside reporters
Finals Game 1	Eric Tipan	Ronnie Magsanoc	Bea Escudero and Denice Dinsay
Finals Game 2	Anton Roxas	Ronnie Magsanoc	Angelique Manto and Denice Dinsay

== Boy's tournament ==
=== Elimination round ===
==== Team standings ====
Pos	Team	Pld	W	L	PCT	GB	Qualification
1	NUNS Bullpups	14	13	1	.929	—	Twice-to-beat in the semifinals
2	UST Tiger Cubs (H)	14	12	2	.857	1	Twice-to-beat in the semifinals
3	UE Junior Red Warriors	14	10	4	.714	3	Twice-to-win in the semifinals
4	FEU–D Baby Tamaraws	14	8	6	.571	5	Twice-to-win in the semifinals
5	Ateneo Blue Eaglets	14	6	8	.429	7	
6	Zobel Junior Archers	14	4	10	.286	9	
7	Adamson Baby Falcons	14	2	12	.143	11	
8	UPIS Junior Fighting Maroons	14	0	14	.000	13	

Source: ABS-CBN Sports
Rules for classification: 1) winning percentage; 2) if tied for #2 or #4, one-game playoff; 3) head-to-head record; 4) head-to-head point differential; 5) overall point differential
(H) Hosts

==== Match-up results ====
	Round 1							Round 2						
Team ╲ Game	1	2	3	4	5	6	7	8	9	10	11	12	13	14
AdU	UP school colors	FEU school colors	La Salle school colors				FEU school colors						Ateneo school colors	
AdMU	UST school colors	NU school colors	UE school colors										Adamson school colors	FEU school colors
DLSU	FEU school colors	UP school colors	Adamson school colors											
FEU	La Salle school colors	Adamson school colors	UP school colors				Adamson school colors	UE school colors						Ateneo school colors
NU	UE school colors	Ateneo school colors	UST school colors											
UE	NU school colors	UST school colors	Ateneo school colors					FEU school colors						
UP	Adamson school colors	La Salle school colors	FEU school colors											
UST	Ateneo school colors	UE school colors	NU school colors	UP school colors	Adamson school colors	La Salle school colors	FEU school colors	FEU school colors	La Salle school colors					

= Win; = Loss

===== Playoffs =====
Semifinals (Nos. 1 & 2 have twice-to-beat advantage)
NU	3
FEU	1
UST	3
UE	0

Finals (Best-of-three series)
1	NU	3	2	3
2	UST	2	3	0

=== Awards ===
- Most valuable player (Season): Lorence Cruz (NUNS Bullpups)
- Most valuable player (Finals): Billie Jean Anima (NUNS Bullpups)
- Rookie of the Year: Raymond Bryce De Guzman (Zobel Junior Archers)
- First Best Outside Spiker: Lorence Cruz (NUNS Bullpups)
- Second Best Outside Spiker: Shaun Christopher Ledesma (UE Junior Red Warriors)
- First Best Middle Blocker: Billie Jean Anima (NUNS Bullpups)
- Second Best Middle Blocker: Jaron Requinton (UST Tiger Cubs)
- Best opposite spiker: Lorenz Señoron (UST Tiger Cubs)
- Best setter: Diogenes Poquita (NUNS Bullpups)
- Best libero: Menard Guerrero (NUNS Bullpups)
- Best server: Rey De Vega (UST Tiger Cubs)

== Girls' tournament ==
=== Elimination round ===
==== Team standings ====
Pos	Team	Pld	W	L	PCT	GB	Qualification
1	NSNU Lady Bullpups	12	12	0	1.000	—	Advance to the Finals
2	UST Junior Tigresses (H)	12	10	2	.833	2	Twice-to-beat in stepladder round 2
3	DLSZ Junior Lady Archers	12	8	4	.667	4	Qualified to stepladder round 1
4	UE Junior Amazons	12	4	8	.333	8	Qualified to stepladder round 1
5	FEU Lady Baby Tamaraws	12	4	8	.333	8	
6	Adamson Lady Baby Falcons	12	4	8	.333	8	
7	UPIS Junior Lady Maroons	12	0	12	.000	12	

Source: ABS-CBN Sports
Rules for classification: 1) winning percentage; 2) if tied for #2 or #4, one-game playoff; 3) head-to-head record; 4) head-to-head point differential; 5) overall point differential
(H) Hosts

==== Match-up results ====
	Round 1						Round 2					
Team ╲ Game	1	2	3	4	5	6	7	8	9	10	11	12
AdU	NU school colors	UST school colors	FEU school colors	La Salle school colors								
DLSU	UP school colors	FEU school colors	Adamson school colors									
FEU	UE school colors	La Salle school colors	Adamson school colors									
NU	Adamson school colors	UP school colors	UST school colors									
UE	FEU school colors	UP school colors										
UP	La Salle school colors	NU school colors	UE school colors									
UST		Adamson school colors	NU school colors									

= Win; = Loss

=== Bracket ===
4th–seed playoff (One–game playoff)
4	FEU	0
5	UE	3

First round (One–game playoff)
3	DLSZ	3
4	UE	0

Semifinals (No. 2 seed has twice-to-beat advantage)
2	UST	3
3	DLSZ	1

Finals (Best-of-three series)
1	NSNU	3	1	3
2	UST	0	3	1

=== Awards ===
- Most valuable player (Season): Faith Janine Shirley Nisperos (NUNS Lady Bullpups)
- Most valuable player (Finals): Princess Robles (NUNS Lady Bullpups)
- Rookie of the Year: Kathleen Keith Layugan (UE Junior Lady Warriors)
- First Best Outside Spiker: Faith Janine Shirley Nisperos (NUNS Lady Bullpups)
- Second Best Outside Spiker: Baby Love Barbon (UST Junior Tigresses)
- First Best Middle Blocker: Thea Gagate (NUNS Lady Bullpups)
- Second Best Middle Blocker: Jewel Encarnacion (Zobel Junior Lady Archers)
- Best opposite spiker: Ejiya Laure (UST Junior Tigresses)
- Best setter: Joyme Cagande (NUNS Lady Bullpups)
- Best libero: Ma. Bernadette Pepito (UST Junior Tigresses)
- Best server: Nicole Magsarile (NUNS Lady Bullpups)

== Overall championship points ==
=== Seniors' division ===
Team	Men	Women	Total
Ateneo Blue Eagles	15	12	27
De La Salle Green Archers	4	15	19
FEU Tamaraws	10	8	18
UST Growling Tigers	8	10	18
NU Bulldogs	12	4	16
UP Fighting Maroons	2	6	8
Adamson Soaring Falcons	6	1	7
UE Red Warriors	1	2	3

=== Juniors' division ===
Team	Boys'	Girls'	Points
NUNS Bullpups	15	15	30
UST Tiger Cubs	12	12	24
UE Junior Red Warriors	10	8	18
Zobel Junior Archers	4	10	14
FEU–D Baby Tamaraws	8	6	14
Adamson Baby Falcons	2	4	6
Ateneo Blue Eaglets	6	-	6
UPIS Junior Fighting Maroons	1	2	3

Pts.	Ranking
15	Champion
12	2nd
10	3rd
8	4th
6	5th
4	6th
2	7th
1	8th
—	Did not join
WD	Withdrew

In case of a tie, the team with the higher position in any tournament is ranked higher. If both are still tied, they are listed by alphabetical order.

How rankings are determined:

- Ranks 5th to 8th determined by elimination round standings.
- Loser of the #1 vs #4 semifinal match-up is ranked 4th
- Loser of the #2 vs #3 semifinal match-up is ranked 3rd
- Loser of the finals is ranked 2nd
- Champion is ranked 1st

Preceded by Season 78 (2016)	UAAP volleyball tournaments Season 79 (2017)	Succeeded by Season 80 (2018)
