= Kim Kianna Dy =

Filipino volleyball player

Personal information
- Full name: Kim Kianna Mababa Dy
- Nickname: KKD
- Nationality: Filipino
- Born: July 26, 1995 (age 31)
- Home town: Manila, Philippines
- Education: De La Salle University
- Height: 1.79 m (5 ft 10 1/2 in)
- Weight: 56.8 kg (125 lb)
- Spike: 280 cm (110 in)
- Block: 270 cm (106 in)

Volleyball information
- Position: Opposite hitter, middle blocker
- Current club: PLDT High Speed Hitters

Career
- Years: Team
- 2015: Shopinas.com Lady Clickers
- 2015: Meralco Power Spikers
- 2016–2023: F2 Logistics Cargo Movers
- 2024–present: PLDT High Speed Hitters
- 2021: Rebisco Philippines

National team
- Years: Team
- 2015–: Philippines

Kim Kianna Mababa Dy (born July 26, 1995) is a Filipino professional volleyball player. She currently plays as an opposite hitter for the PLDT High Speed Hitters of the Premier Volleyball League (PVL) and represents the Philippines in international competitions.

== Education ==
Dy attended the De La Salle Santiago Zobel School from kindergarten to high school and finished her high school in 2013. She graduated with a Bachelor of Science degree in business management from De La Salle University.

== Career ==
Dy studied at De La Salle University and a former member of the university's women's volleyball team. In high school, she played for the DLSZ Junior Archers in the UAAP Girls Division. As a high school player, she received the UAAP girls division Most Valuable Player during Season 73 and Best Blocker award in the seasons Season 74 and Season 75, having won three UAAP volleyball championships from the Season 73 to 75. With NCR Team for Palarong Pambansa in 2012 she won the regional championship.

In 2015, Dy played for the Shopinas.com Lady Clickers and the Meralco Power Spikers in the Philippine Super Liga. She was a member of the Philippines women's national volleyball team that competed in the 2015 Asian Women's Volleyball Championship where it placed 12th out of 14 countries. In 2016, Dy received her very first collegiate-level award, the Most Valuable Player (Finals), after winning the UAAP Season 78 championship against arch-rival, Ateneo.

With F2 Logistics Cargo Movers, Dy won the 2017 PSL Grand Prix Conference championship and was awarded the Second Best Opposite Spiker. During the COVID-19 pandemic Dy, together with the F2 Logistics Cargo Movers participated in the 2021 PNVF Champions League for Women. Dy and the team won the championship with Dy being named at the conference's Most Valuable Player.

After the disbandment of the F2 Logistics Cargo Movers in 2023, Dy was signed and plays for the PLDT High Speed Hitters playing as an opposite spiker. However, she was unable to compete for the team until January 2025 due to a knee injury she sustained while she was in F2 in July 2023.

== Personal life ==
Since 2020, Dy has been in a relationship with Filipino-American basketball player Dwight Ramos.

== Awards ==
=== Individuals ===
- UAAP Season 73 Juniors' "Most valuable player"
- UAAP Season 74 Juniors' "Best blocker"
- UAAP Season 75 Juniors' "Best blocker"
- UAAP Season 78 Seniors' Finals' "Most valuable player"
- 2017 Philippine Superliga Grand Prix "2nd Best Opposite Spiker"
- 2021 PNVF Champions League (Women) "Most valuable player"
- 2021 PNVF Champions League (Women) "Best opposite spiker"

=== Others ===
- DLSAA Lasallian Sports Achievement Award (2017)
- Gawad Lasalyano (2017)

=== Collegiate ===
- 2014 UAAP Season 76 volleyball tournaments - Silver medal, with De La Salle Lady Spikers
- 2015 UAAP Season 77 volleyball tournaments - Silver medal, with De La Salle Lady Spikers
- 2016 UAAP Season 78 volleyball tournaments - Champion, with De La Salle Lady Spikers
- 2017 UAAP Season 79 volleyball tournaments - Champion, with De La Salle Lady Spikers
- 2018 UAAP Season 80 volleyball tournaments - Champion, with De La Salle Lady Spikers

=== Clubs ===
- 2015 PSL All-Filipino Conference – Silver medal, with Shopinas.com Lady Clickers
- 2016 PSL All-Filipino Conference – Champion, with F2 Logistics Cargo Movers
- 2016 PSL Grand Prix Conference – Bronze medal, with F2 Logistics Cargo Movers
- 2017 PSL All-Filipino Conference – Silver medal, with F2 Logistics Cargo Movers
- 2017 PSL Grand Prix Conference – Champion, with F2 Logistics Cargo Movers
- 2018 PSL Grand Prix Conference - Silver medal, with F2 Logistics Cargo Movers
- 2018 PSL Invitational Cup - Champion, with F2 Logistics Cargo Movers
- 2018 PSL All-Filipino Conference - Silver medal, with F2 Logistics Cargo Movers
- 2019 PSL Grand Prix Conference - Silver medal, with F2 Logistics Cargo Movers
- 2019 PSL All-Filipino Conference - Champion, with F2 Logistics Cargo Movers
- 2019 PSL Invitational Conference - Champion, with F2 Logistics Cargo Movers
- 2021 PNVF Champions League (Women) - Champion, with F2 Logistics Cargo Movers
- 2023 Premier Volleyball League First All-Filipino Conference, Bronze medal, with F2 Logistics Cargo Movers
- 2025 Premier Volleyball League on Tour – Champion, with PLDT High Speed Hitters
- 2025 Premier Volleyball League Invitational – Champion, with PLDT High Speed Hitters
