= Dawn Macandili-Catindig =

Filipino volleyball player

Personal information
- Full name: Dawn Nicole Lirio Macandili
- Nationality: Filipino
- Born: June 1, 1996 (age 30) Tanauan, Batangas, Philippines
- Education: De La Salle University
- Height: 153 cm (5 ft 0 in)
- Weight: 50 kg (110 lb)

Volleyball information
- Position: Libero
- Current club: Choco Mucho Flying Titans

Career
- Years: Team
- 2014–2015: Meralco
- 2016–2023: F2 Logistics
- 2024–2026: Cignal
- 2026–present: Choco Mucho
- 2021: Choco Mucho (AVC)

National team
- Years: Team
- 2017–: Philippines
Honours
Women's volleyball
Representing Philippines
Asian Nations Cup
Silver medal – second place	2025 Hanoi	Team
Bronze medal – third place	2024 Manila	Team
SEA V.League
Bronze medal – third place	2019 Nakhon Ratchasima	Leg 1
Bronze medal – third place	2019 Santa Rosa	Leg 2
Bronze medal – third place	2024 Vĩnh Phúc	Leg 1
Bronze medal – third place	2024 Nakhon Ratchasima	Leg 2
- Updated on 11 August 2024

Dawn Nicole Lirio Macandili-Catindig (born June 1, 1996) is a Filipino professional volleyball player who is a libero for the Choco Mucho Flying Titans of the Premier Volleyball League (PVL). She is a member of the Philippines women's national volleyball team. She played in the UAAP for the De La Salle University Lady Spikers for 5 seasons (76-80).

== Personal life ==
Macandili is a graduate of AB Psychology at De La Salle University.

In March 2023, she married her longtime boyfriend, Diego Catindig.

== Career ==
Macandili was the first libero in the Philippines to receive a Most Valuable Player award when she won the award in the 2016 Philippine Super Liga All-Filipino Conference.

She is also a member of the Philippine National Women's Volleyball Team that played in the 2017 Asian Women's Volleyball Championship, where in she was hailed as the 2nd Best Libero. She also played in the Kuala Lumpur, Malaysia for the 29th Southeast Asian Games replacing an injured Denden Lazaro.

With F2 Logistics Cargo Movers, Macandili won the 2017 PSL Grand Prix Conference championship and was awarded the Best Libero.

Macandili won finals MVP award during UAAP Season 80, winning their third consecutive title.

In 2023, she joined the Cignal HD Spikers.

In 2024, she was named captain of the Philippines women's national volleyball team, succeeding Jia De Guzman.

== Clubs ==
- (Philippines) Meralco Power Spikers (2014–2015)
- (Philippines) F2 Logistics Cargo Movers (2016–2023)
- (Philippines) Cignal HD Spikers (2024–2026)
- (Philippines) Choco Mucho Flying Titans (2026–present)
- (Philippines) Choco Mucho (2021) (Note: National team as club; not to be confused with Choco Mucho Flying Titans)

== Awards ==
=== Individual ===
==== Local ====
- UAAP Juniors Season 75 "Best Libero"
- UAAP Season 78 "Best Digger"
- UAAP Season 78 "Best Receiver"
- 2016 PSL All-Filipino Conference "Best Libero"
- 2016 PSL All-Filipino Conference "Most Valuable Player"
- 2016 PSL Grand Prix Conference "Best Libero"
- UAAP Season 79 "Best Receiver"
- 2017 PSL Grand Prix Conference "Best Libero"
- UAAP Season 80 "Finals MVP"
- 2018 PSL Invitational Cup "Best Libero"
- 2019 PSL Grand Prix Conference "Best Libero"
- 2021 PNVF Champions League for Women "Best Libero"
- 2022 Premier Volleyball League Open Conference "Best Libero"
- 2024 PNVF Champions League for Women "Best Libero"

==== International ====
- 2017 Asian Women's Volleyball Championships "2nd Best Libero"
- 2019 ASEAN Grand Prix – Second Leg "Best Libero"

=== Others ===
- Gawad Lasalyano (2017)
- Philippine Sports Association Miss Volleyball (2017)

=== Collegiate ===
- 2014 UAAP Season 76 - Silver medal, with De La Salle Lady Spikers
- 2015 UAAP Season 77 - Silver medal, with De La Salle Lady Spikers
- 2016 UAAP Season 78 - Champion, with De La Salle Lady Spikers
- 2017 UAAP Season 79 - Champion, with De La Salle Lady Spikers
- 2018 UAAP Season 80 - Champion, with De La Salle Lady Spikers

=== Club ===
- 2016 PSL All-Filipino Conference - Champion, with F2 Logistics Cargo Movers
- 2016 PSL Grand Prix Conference - Bronze medal, with F2 Logistics Cargo Movers
- 2017 PSL All-Filipino Conference - Runner-up with F2 Logistics Cargo Movers
- 2017 PSL Grand Prix Conference - Champion, with F2 Logistics Cargo Movers
- 2018 PSL Invitational Cup - Champion, with F2 Logistics Cargo Movers
- 2019 PSL Grand Prix Conference - Runner-up with F2 Logistics Cargo Movers
- 2019 PSL Grand Prix Conference - Champion, with F2 Logistics Cargo Movers
- 2021 PNVF Champions League for Women - Champion, with F2 Logistics Cargo Movers
- 2024 PNVF Champions League for Women - Runner-up with Cignal HD Spikers

== Notes ==
Awards
Preceded by (South Korea) Nam Jie-youn	Best Libero of Asian Championship; 2017 (with (Japan) Mako Kobata)	Succeeded by (Thailand) Piyanut Pannoy

Awards
Preceded by Herself	Best Receiver of UAAP Volleyball Championship; 2017	Succeeded by Kath Arado
