= Carmela Tunay =

Filipino volleyball player (born 1995)

Personal information
- Nationality: Filipino
- Born: June 8, 1995 (age 31); Mandaluyong, Philippines
- Hometown: Makati, Philippines
- Height: 1.72 m (5 ft 8 in)
- Weight: 66 kg (146 lb)
- Spike: 285 cm (112 in)
- Block: 280 cm (110 in)
- Education: University of Santo Tomas

Volleyball information
- Position: Open Hitter
- Number: 18

Career
| Years | Teams |
|---|---|
| 2011–2015 | UST Golden Tigresses |
| 2015 | Cignal HD Spikers |
| 2017–2019 | Petron Blaze Spikers |
| 2020 | Motolite Power Builders |
| 2021 | Peak Form Lady Spikers |

Maria Carmela "Mela" Tunay is Filipino former volleyball player, actress, and TV host. She played for the UST Lady Tigresses in the UAAP and the Cignal HD Spikers in the PSL until 2016. She then transferred and played for the Petron Blaze Spikers from 2017 to 2019.

== Personal life ==
Carmela Tunay was born in Mandaluyong. She resides in Makati where she attended Saint Paul College. She graduated from the University of Santo Tomas with a bachelor's degree in Communication Arts. Tunay finished her Marketing master's degree in UST, during her last playing season, UAAP season 78.

Tunay was formerly in a relationship with fellow volleyball player Kim Fajardo. Their relationship lasted for seven years until it ended sometime during the COVID-19 pandemic in the early 2020s.

== Career ==
Tunay was a member of the UST Golden Tigresses, the collegiate varsity volleyball team of UST which plays in the UAAP Volleyball tournament. The Golden Tigresses finished 6th and 5th place in UAAP Season 76 and 77 respectively. In 2015, she joined the Cignal HD Spikers which plays in the Philippine Super Liga. During a game between the TIP and UST in the Shakeys V-League Collegiate Conference 2015, Tunay suffered a nose injury. Two weeks later she was back in action when UST played against the UP Lady Maroons, and in the semifinals against ADMU Lady Blue Spikers and eventually lost to FEU Tamaraws on the third place game.

With Petron Blaze Spikers, she won the 2017 PSL Invitational Cup silver medal, 2017 PSL All-Filipino Conference gold medal and 2017 PSL Grand Prix Conference silver medal.

== Awards ==
=== Clubs ===
- 2017 Philippine SuperLiga Invitational Cup – Runner-Up, with Petron Blaze Spikers
- 2017 Philippine SuperLiga All-Filipino Conference – Champion, with Petron Blaze Spikers
- 2017 Philippine SuperLiga Grand Prix – Runner-Up, with Petron Blaze Spikers
- 2018 Philippine SuperLiga Grand Prix – Champion, with Petron Blaze Spikers
- 2018 Philippine SuperLiga Grand Prix – Runner-Up, with Petron Blaze Spikers
