= 2017 Philippine Super Liga Grand Prix =

Third indoor conference of the 2017 Philippine Super Liga season

- Duration: October 21 – December 16, 2017
- Teams: 9
- TV partner(s): TV5, AksyonTV, Sports5.ph

Results
- Champions: F2 Logistics Cargo Movers
- Runners-up: Petron Blaze Spikers
- Third place: Foton Tornadoes
- Fourth place: Cocolife Asset Managers

Awards
- MVP: María José Pérez
- Best OH: Hillary Hurley; Lindsay Stalzer
- Best MB: Mika Reyes; Majoy Baron
- Best OPP: Jaja Santiago; Kim Kianna Dy
- Best Setter: Kim Fajardo
- Best Libero: Dawn Macandili; Yuri Fukuda

PSL Grand Prix chronology
- < 2016 2018 >

PSL conference chronology
- < 2017 All-Filipino 2018 Grand Prix >

The 2017 Philippine Super Liga Grand Prix (also known as the 2017 Chooks-to-Go Philippine Super Liga Grand Prix due to sponsorship reasons) was the third and final conference of the 2017 season of the Philippine Super Liga (PSL) and fifth running of the Grand Prix. The conference ran from October 21 to December 16, 2017, with the formal opening ceremony on October 28, 2017, at the Filoil Flying V Centre in San Juan.

This tournament featured nine teams with the debut of the Iriga City Oragons and the inclusion of the UST Golden Tigresses in the lineup. The F2 Logistics Cargo Movers avenged their All-Filipino Conference loss against the Petron Blaze Spikers to win their second league title.

== Teams ==
2017 Philippine Super Liga Grand Prix
Abbr.	Team	Affiliation	Head coach	Team captain	Imports
CHD	Cignal HD Spikers	Cignal TV, Inc.	(Philippines) George Pascua	Stephanie Mercado	(Australia) Beth Carey (United States) Alexis Mathews (Japan) Mami Miyashita
CCL	Cocolife Asset Managers	United Coconut Planters Life Assurance Corporation	(Philippines) Kungfu Reyes	Michele Gumabao	(United States) Shar Latai Manu-Olevao (United States) Taylor Milton
FTL	F2 Logistics Cargo Movers	F2 Global Logistics, Inc.	(Philippines) Ramil de Jesus	Cha Cruz	(United States) Kennedy Bryan (Venezuela) María José Pérez
FOT	Foton Tornadoes	United Asia Automotive Group, Inc.	(Serbia) Moro Branislav	Jaja Santiago	(Montenegro) Dragana Perunicic (Serbia) Sara Klisura (Serbia) Katarina Vukomanovic
GAL	Generika–Ayala Lifesavers	Erikagen, Inc.	(Philippines) Francis Vicente	Angeli Pauline Araneta	(Croatia) Katarina Pilepic (Trinidad and Tobago) Darlene Ramdin (United States) Penina Snuka
ICO	Iriga City Oragons	Iriga City	(Philippines) Parley Tupaz	Reynelen Raterta	(Serbia) Tamara Kmezić (Japan) Samaa Miyagawa (Japan) Minami Yoshioka
PET	Petron Blaze Spikers	Petron Corporation	(Philippines) Shaq Delos Santos	Frances Molina	(United States) Hillary Hurley (United States) Lindsay Stalzer (Japan) Yuri Fukuda
SLR	Sta. Lucia Lady Realtors	Sta. Lucia Realty and Development Corporation	(Philippines) Jerry Yee	Djanel Cheng	(Ukraine) Bohdana Anisova (Canada) Marisa Field (Canada) Kristen Moncks
UST	Victoria Sports–UST	New San Jose Builders, Inc. and University of Santo Tomas	(Philippines) Paul Jan Doloiras	Shannen Palec	(Japan) Yukie Inamasu

== Format ==
Preliminary round

- The preliminary round was a single round-robin tournament, with each team playing one match against all other teams in their pool for a total of eight matches.
- The top eight teams advanced to the quarterfinals while the ninth-place team was eliminated.

Quarterfinals

- The quarterfinals featured single-elimination matches.
- The match-ups were as follows:
  - QF1: #1 vs. #8
  - QF2: #2 vs. #7
  - QF3: #3 vs. #6
  - QF4: #4 vs. #5
- The winners advanced to the semifinals while the losers were eliminated.

Semifinals

- The semifinals also featured single-elimination matches.
- The match-ups were as follows:
  - SF1: QF1 vs. QF4 winner
  - SF2: QF2 vs. QF3 winner
- The winners advanced to the championship match while the losers would play in the third-place match.

Finals

- The third-place match was single-elimination while the championship was a best-of-three series.
- The match-ups were as follows:
  - Championship: Semifinal round winners
  - Third-place match: Semifinal round losers

== Preliminary round ==
Pos	Team	Pld	W	L	Pts	SW	SL	SR	SPW	SPL	SPR	Qualification
1	F2 Logistics Cargo Movers	8	7	1	22	23	4	5.750	649	535	1.213	Quarterfinals
2	Petron Blaze Spikers	8	7	1	21	22	6	3.667	674	553	1.219	Quarterfinals
3	Foton Tornadoes	8	7	1	20	22	7	3.143	693	558	1.242	Quarterfinals
4	Cignal HD Spikers	8	4	4	13	16	14	1.143	660	658	1.003	Quarterfinals
5	Cocolife Asset Managers	8	3	5	10	14	18	0.778	666	707	0.942	Quarterfinals
6	Sta. Lucia Lady Realtors	8	3	5	9	13	18	0.722	650	685	0.949	Quarterfinals
7	Generika–Ayala Lifesavers	8	3	5	8	11	17	0.647	589	619	0.952	Quarterfinals
8	Iriga City Oragons	8	2	6	5	6	20	0.300	500	611	0.818	Quarterfinals
9	Victoria Sports–UST	8	0	8	0	1	24	0.042	462	617	0.749	

Date	Time		Score		Set 1	Set 2	Set 3	Set 4	Set 5	Total	Report
21 October	16:00	Generika–Ayala Lifesavers	0–3	Petron Blaze Spikers	13–25	17–25	19–25	–		49–75	P2
21 October	18:00	Cignal HD Spikers	1–3	Foton Tornadoes	15–25	19–25	25–22	22–25		81–97	P2
24 October	16:15	Sta. Lucia Lady Realtors	2–3	Iriga City Oragons	25–15	20–25	25–22	16–25	13–15	99–102	P2
24 October	19:00	Generika–Ayala Lifesavers	3–2	Cocolife Asset Managers	25–11	23–25	16–25	25–13	15–9	104–83	P2
26 October	16:30	Petron Blaze Spikers	3–1	Sta. Lucia Lady Realtors	27–25	25–20	22–25	25–14		99–84	P2
26 October	18:30	Generika–Ayala Lifesavers	1–3	Cignal HD Spikers	16–25	21–25	27–25	21–25		85–100	P2
28 October	16:30	Cocolife Asset Managers	1–3	Foton Tornadoes	25–20	17–25	26–28	18–25		86–98	P2
28 October	18:30	Petron Blaze Spikers	3–1	Cignal HD Spikers	19–25	25–9	25–22	28–26		97–82	P2
4 November	14:00	Generika–Ayala Lifesavers	0–3	Foton Tornadoes	22–25	22–25	16–25	–		60–75	P2
4 November	16:00	Cocolife Asset Managers	3–2	Cignal HD Spikers	19–25	24–26	27–25	25–16	15–9	110–101	P2
4 November	18:00	F2 Logistics Cargo Movers	3–1	Petron Blaze Spikers	25–21	20–25	25–23	25–22		95–91	P2
7 November	14:00	Foton Tornadoes	3–0	Iriga City Oragons	25–10	25–23	25–19	–		75–52	P2
7 November	16:15	Victoria Sports–UST	1–3	Cocolife Asset Managers	19–25	25–16	17–25	20–25		81–91	P2
7 November	19:00	F2 Logistics Cargo Movers	3–0	Sta. Lucia Lady Realtors	25–16	25–23	25–23	–		75–62	P2
9 November	16:15	Iriga City Oragons	0–3	Generika–Ayala Lifesavers	16–25	15–25	21–25	–		52–75	P2
9 November	19:00	Victoria Sports–UST	0–3	Petron Blaze Spikers	16–25	14–25	14–25	–		44–75	P2
11 November	16:00	Iriga City Oragons	0–3	Cignal HD Spikers	24–26	23–25	17–25	–		64–76	P2
11 November	18:00	F2 Logistics Cargo Movers	3–0	Cocolife Asset Managers	26–24	25–21	25–21	–		76–66	P2
14 November	16:15	Victoria Sports–UST	0–3	Sta. Lucia Lady Realtors	19–25	21–25	19–25	–		59–75	P2
14 November	19:00	Foton Tornadoes	1–3	Petron Blaze Spikers	21–25	22–25	25–12	20–25		88–87	P2
16 November	16:15	Cocolife Asset Managers	3–0	Iriga City Oragons	25–23	25–15	26–24	–		76–62	P2
16 November	19:00	Generika–Ayala Lifesavers	0–3	F2 Logistics Cargo Movers	21–25	17–25	17–25	–		55–75	P2
18 November	16:00	Foton Tornadoes	3–0	Sta. Lucia Lady Realtors	25–16	25–11	25–16	–		75–43	P2
18 November	18:00	Victoria Sports–UST	0–3	F2 Logistics Cargo Movers	22–25	19–25	19–25	–		60–75	P2
21 November	16:15	Generika–Ayala Lifesavers	3–0	Victoria Sports–UST	25–16	25–19	25–23	–		75–58	P2
21 November	19:00	Cignal HD Spikers	0–3	F2 Logistics Cargo Movers	22–25	13–25	12–25	–		47–75	P2
23 November	16:15	Iriga City Oragons	3–0	Victoria Sports–UST	25–19	25–21	25–20	–		75–60	P2
23 November	19:00	Cignal HD Spikers	3–1	Sta. Lucia Lady Realtors	25–19	22–25	25–15	25–17		97–76	P2
25 November	16:15	Petron Blaze Spikers	3–0	Iriga City Oragons	25–12	25–15	25–22	–		75–49	P2
25 November	18:00	Foton Tornadoes	3–2	F2 Logistics Cargo Movers	17–25	32–30	25–9	20–25	16–14	110–103	P2
28 November	16:15	Sta. Lucia Lady Realtors	3–2	Cocolife Asset Managers	23–25	22–25	25–12	25–23	15–7	110–92	P2
28 November	19:00	Foton Tornadoes	3–0	Victoria Sports–UST	25–8	25–22	25–16	–		75–46	P2
30 November	16:15	Petron Blaze Spikers	3–0	Cocolife Asset Managers	25–19	25–21	25–22	–		75–62	P2
30 November	19:00	Generika–Ayala Lifesavers	1–3	Sta. Lucia Lady Realtors	27–25	18–25	17–25	24–26		86–101	P2
2 December	16:00	Cignal HD Spikers	3–0	Victoria Sports–UST	26–24	25–16	25–14	–		76–54	P2
2 December	18:00	Iriga City Oragons	0–3	F2 Logistics Cargo Movers	11–25	17–25	16–25	–		44–75	P2

== Playoffs ==
Quarterfinals
F2 Logistics Cargo Movers	3
Iriga City Oragons	0
Cignal HD Spikers	0
Cocolife Asset Managers	3
Foton Tornadoes	3
Sta. Lucia Lady Realtors	1
Petron Blaze Spikers	3
Generika–Ayala Lifesavers	2

Semifinals
F2 Logistics Cargo Movers	3
Cocolife Asset Managers	0
Foton Tornadoes	1
Petron Blaze Spikers	3

Finals (Best-of-3)
F2 Logistics Cargo Movers	0	3	3
Petron Blaze Spikers	3	2	1
3rd place
Cocolife Asset Managers	0
Foton Tornadoes	3

=== Quarterfinals ===
Date	Time		Score		Set 1	Set 2	Set 3	Set 4	Set 5	Total	Report
5 December	16:15	F2 Logistics Cargo Movers	3–0	Iriga City Oragons	25–19	25–12	25–17			75–48	P2
5 December	19:00	Petron Blaze Spikers	3–2	Generika–Ayala Lifesavers	19–25	25–22	22–25	25–17	15–11	106–100	P2
7 December	16:15	Foton Tornadoes	3–1	Sta. Lucia Lady Realtors	21–25	25–17	25–23	25–17		96–82	P2
7 December	19:00	Cignal HD Spikers	0–3	Cocolife Asset Managers	23–25	23–25	20–25			66–75	P2

=== Semifinals ===
Date	Time		Score		Set 1	Set 2	Set 3	Set 4	Set 5	Total	Report
9 December	16:00	F2 Logistics Cargo Movers	3–0	Cocolife Asset Managers	25–17	25–16	25–17			75–50	P2
9 December	18:00	Petron Blaze Spikers	3–1	Foton Tornadoes	30–28	21–25	25–23	25–21		101–97	P2

=== Bronze match ===
Date	Time		Score		Set 1	Set 2	Set 3	Set 4	Set 5	Total	Report
12 December	16:15	Cocolife Asset Managers	0–3	Foton Tornadoes	17–25	16–25	17–25			50–75	P2

=== Finals ===
Date	Time		Score		Set 1	Set 2	Set 3	Set 4	Set 5	Total	Report
12 December	19:00	F2 Logistics Cargo Movers	0–3	Petron Blaze Spikers	14–25	21–25	16–25			51–75	P2
14 December	19:00	Petron Blaze Spikers	2–3	F2 Logistics Cargo Movers	20–25	26–24	25–14	19–25	4–15	94–103	P2
16 December	16:00	F2 Logistics Cargo Movers	3–1	Petron Blaze Spikers	25–20	25–19	20–25	25–18		95–82	P2

== Final standing ==
Rank	Team
1st place, gold medalist(s)	F2 Logistics Cargo Movers
2nd place, silver medalist(s)	Petron Blaze Spikers
3rd place, bronze medalist(s)	Foton Tornadoes
4	Cocolife Asset Managers
5	Cignal HD Spikers
6	Sta. Lucia Lady Realtors
7	Generika–Ayala Lifesavers
8	Iriga City Oragons
9	Victoria Sports–UST

2017 PSL Grand Prix Champions

Team roster

Abigail Maraño, Kennedy Lynne Bryan (Import), Carmel June Saga, Dawn Macandili, Ernestine Tiamzon, Fritz Joy Gallenero, Kim Fajardo, Mary Joy Baron, Charleen Abigaile Cruz (c), Shawna Lei-Santos, Aduke Christine Ogunsanya, Kim Kianna Dy, María José Pérez (Import), Desiree Wynea Cheng
Head Coach: Ramil de Jesus

== Individual awards ==
Award		Name/Team
MVP		(Venezuela) María José Pérez (F2 Logistics)
Best Outside Spiker	1st:	(United States) Hillary Hurley (Petron)
Best Outside Spiker	2nd:	(United States) Lindsay Stalzer (Petron)
Best Middle Blocker	1st:	(Philippines) Mika Reyes (Petron)
Best Middle Blocker	2nd:	(Philippines) Mary Joy Baron (F2 Logistics)
Best Opposite Spiker	1st:	(Philippines) Jaja Santiago (Foton)
Best Opposite Spiker	2nd:	(Philippines) Kim Kianna Dy (F2 Logistics)
Best Setter		(Philippines) Kim Fajardo (F2 Logistics)
Best Libero	1st:	(Philippines) Dawn Macandili (F2 Logistics)
Best Libero	2nd:	(Japan) Yuri Fukuda (Petron)
Best Scorer in a Match		(Serbia) Sara Klisura (Foton)

== Venues ==
- Filoil Flying V Center (main venue)
- University of St. La Salle–Bacolod
- Malolos Sports and Convention Center
- De La Salle Lipa Centrum
- Batangas City Sports Center
- Mall of Asia Arena

== Broadcast partners ==
- Sports5: AksyonTV, ESPN 5, Hyper (SD and HD), Sports5.ph
