= Cyd Demecillo =

Filipino volleyball player

Personal information
- Full name: Cydthealee Alivio Demecillo
- Nicknames: Cyd, Thea, Didit
- Born: December 2, 1993 (age 32)
- Home town: Cebu, Philippines
- Height: 173 cm (5 ft 8 in)
- Weight: 56.8 kg (125 lb)

Volleyball information
- Position: Outside hitter

Career
- Years: Team
- 2015: Meralco Power Spikers
- 2016: F2 Logistics Cargo Movers

Cydthealee "Cyd" Alivio Demecillo (born December 2, 1993) is a Filipino volleyball athlete.

== Personal life ==
Demecillo was born on December 2, 1993, in Cebu, the youngest daughter of Esmael and Imelda Demecillo. Her two other siblings are Cydeshemee and Cydtishamee. Since 2011, the Demecillo sisters are in charge of their family business, the Cydelicious Lechon Manok restaurant. She graduated high school from the University of Southern Philippines Foundation where she played a Middle Hitter. In February 2015, she graduated with a Bachelor of Arts degree majoring in Sports Studies.

== Career ==
Demecillo was a member of the De La Salle University collegiate women's varsity volleyball team in both indoor and beach volleyball where she played as an Outside Hitter. She debuted in Season 73 of the UAAP as an Open Hitter. She helped her team to win the 2013 PVF Intercollegiate Volleyball Championship. She skipped the following season. After her 5-year eligibility in the University Athletic Association of the Philippines, she finished with three championship titles. During the Season 78 of the UAAP, she suffered an injury in her right knee that kept her out of the court for two weeks, but she returned playing as a libero before returning to the opposite spiker position to contribute to the UAAP Season 78 Championship for De La Salle University.

She also played in the 18th Nestea Beach Intercollegiate Beach Volleyball with Kim Fajardo in 2015, replacing Fajardo's previous partner, Ara Galang winning the silver medal after losing 1-2 to the University of Santo Tomas representatives, the Rika Rivera and Cherry Rondina duro. With Kim Fajardo she won the 2015 UAAP's beach volleyball tournament, the first ever for De La Salle University.

During the 2015 Philippine National Games, she was awarded First Best Outside Hitter and won the gold medal with De La Salle University when they defeated College of St. Benilde Lady Blazers. Demecillio played with Meralco Power Spikers in the 2015 Philippine Super Liga Grand Prix Conference and with F2 Logistics Cargo Movers for the 2016 Philippine Super Liga All-Filipino Conference helping that club to win their first Superliga championship.

== Clubs ==
- (Philippines) De La Salle University (2010-2016)
- (Philippines) Meralco Power Spikers (2015)
- (Philippines) F2 Logistics Cargo Movers (2016)

== Awards ==
=== Individuals ===
- 2015 Philippine National Games "1st Best Outside Hitter"
