= University of St. La Salle–Integrated School =

Roman Catholic school in Bacolod, Philippines

University of St. La Salle-Integrated School

Location
- La Salle Avenue; Bacolod, Negros Occidental; Philippines; 10°40′44″N 122°57′45″E

Information
- Type: Private
- Motto: Latin: Fides Servitium Committere (Faith, Zeal for Service, and Communion in Mission)
- Religious affiliations: Roman Catholic (Christian Brothers)
- Patron saint: St. Jean-Baptiste de La Salle
- Established: 1952
- Oversight: De La Salle Brothers
- President: Br. Joaquin Severino F. Martinez, FSC
- Principal: Dr. Baldomero F. Defensor Jr., PhD
- Staff: 150
- Gender: Co-educational
- Enrollment: 1,600
- Campus size: 10 ha. / 100,000 m²
- Campus type: Urban
- Colors: Green and white
- Song: Alma Mater Hymn
- Website: usls.edu.ph/overviews/USLS-Integrated-School-IS

The University of St. La Salle–Integrated School (USLS-IS), located in La Salle Avenue-Montelibano Drive and in Villa Lucasan Subdivision, Brgy. Mandalagan, Bacolod, Philippines, is a Catholic primary and secondary school (Junior High) run by the De La Salle Brothers. Established in 1952 as La Salle - Bacolod, it is the second oldest campus founded by the congregation in the country. The university is a member of De La Salle Philippines, a network established in 2006 comprising 17 Lasallian institutions in the country. It is under the supervision and administration of University of St. La Salle.

Its original campus in La Salle Avenue-Montelibano Drive houses the junior high school and grade school (collectively, the Integrated School). USLS-IS offers programs in Kinder(preschool), Angel's Center(Special Education), elementary, and junior high levels.

== Integrated school curriculum ==
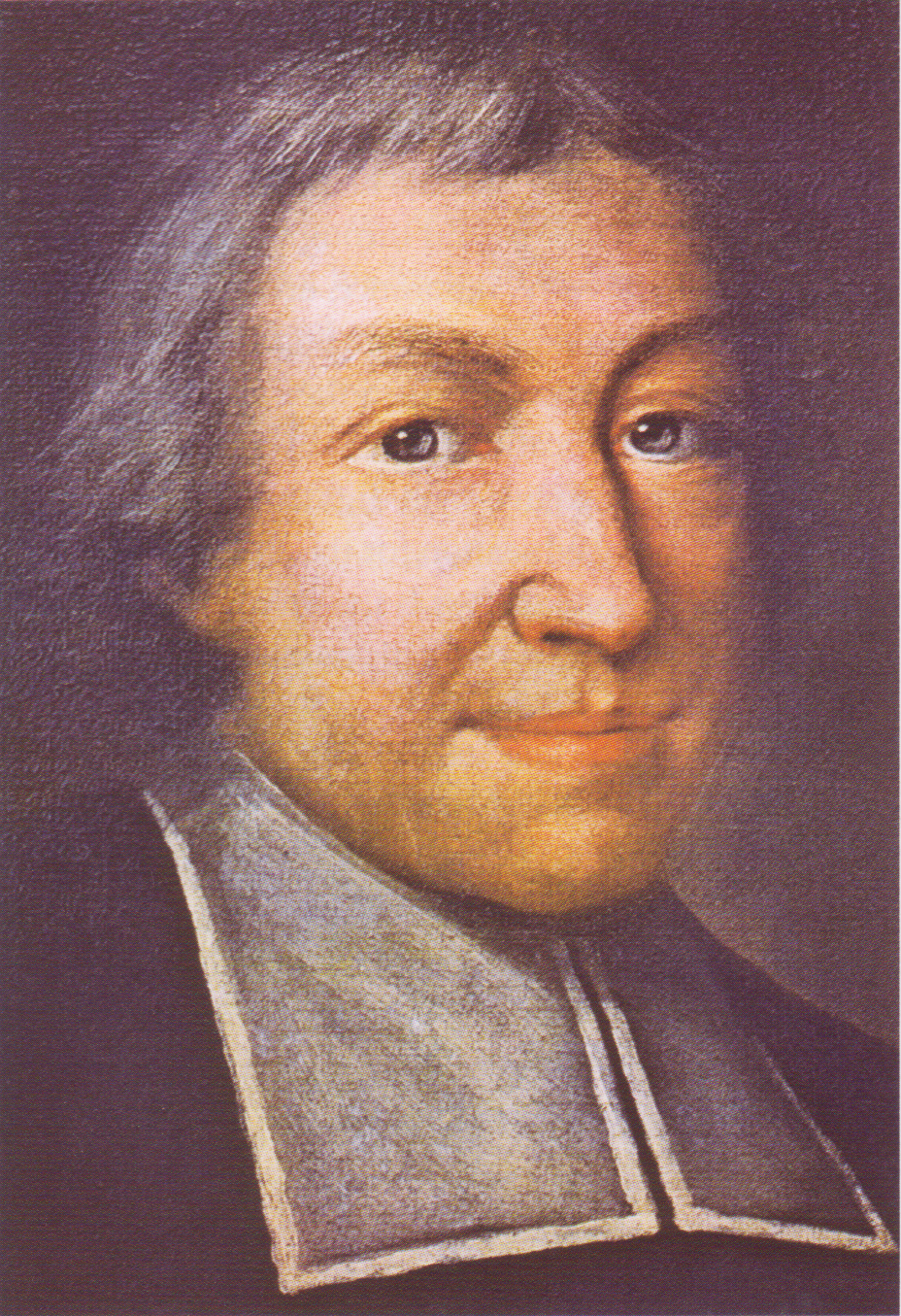
St. Jean-Baptiste de La Salle

The USLS-IS is an educational institution accredited by the Philippine Association of Accrediting Schools, Colleges and Universities (PAASCU). As such, it is covered by DECS Order No. 93, s. 1992 which stipulates that accredited schools are granted "partial curricular autonomy including the authority to revise the curricula without DepEd approval provided that minimum DepEd requirements and guidelines are complied with and the revised curriculum submitted to DepED."

The school has constantly evaluated and revised its curriculum to meet the minimum requirements of the 2002 Basic Education Curriculum (BEC) and go even beyond the minimum requirements. The schools follows the separate subject teaching mode as provided by the BEC. The curriculum is also designed to achieve the school's vision-mission which is college preparatory, wholistic formation of students and academic excellence.

== Patron saint ==
The university's patron saint is St. John Baptist de La Salle, a French priest, educational reformer, and founder of international educational movement who spent over forty years of his life dedicated to education for the children of the poor. In the process, he standardized educational practices throughout France, wrote inspirational meditations on the ministry of teaching (along with catechisms, politeness texts, and other resources for teachers and students), and became the catalyst and resource for many other religious congregations dedicated to education that were founded in the 18th and 19th centuries.

== IS Mikel Lovina Sportsfest ==
The Sportsfest is named as Mikel Lovina in honor of the late Mikel Lovina who was an athlete of the school. The school has 5 houses which are: The House of Ruhland, The House of Cody, The House of Murray, The House of Wester and The House of Masson. The name of the houses are derived from the first brothers of the school.

Since there are four levels in Junior High, Four different houses will compete to be called as the champion while one house will rest for the mean time. Rotation of colors will happen. Each batch in Junior High is called as one house.

Mikel Lovina Sportsfest Winners
Year	Overall Champion	Overall 1st Runner-Up	Cheerdance Champion	Cheerdance 1st Runner-Up
2025	House of Murray (Grade 9)	House of Cody (Grade 10)	House of Murray (Grade 9)	House of Cody (Grade 10)
D. 2024	House of Ruhland (Grade 10)	House of Cody (Grade 9)	House of Cody (Grade 9)	House of Ruhland (Grade 10)
M. 2024	House of Masson (Grade 10)	House of Ruhland (Grade 9)	House of Masson (Grade 10)	House of Cody (Grade 8)
2023	House of Wester (Grade 10)	House of Masson (Grade 9)	House of Wester (Grade 10)	House of Masson (Grade 9)
2019	House of Ruhland (Grade 10)	House of Cody (Grade 9)	House of Ruhland (Grade 10)	House of Wester (Grade 7)
2018	House of Masson (Grade 10)	House of Ruhland (Grade 9)	House of Masson (Grade 10)	House of Ruhland (Grade 9)
2017	House of Masson (Grade 9)	House of Wester (Grade 10)	House of Masson (Grade 9)	House of Wester (Grade 10)

== Student Publications & Life ==
The school provides opportunities for student writers to improve their craft through practice, interaction, and instructions in journalism and creative writing. It also provides advice to student writers on matters concerning campus press operations and management, encourages students to get involved in the publications and develops a pool of talents who are able to serve in the school papers. The school also provides opportunities for students who want to be involved in an organization specifically one in and of their interests. It allows students to grow their skills in leadership, advocacy, and foster their interests.

=== Integrated School Publications ===
- Green Beacon – The official Lower Grades English publication of the USLS-IS.
- Luntiang Tanglaw – The official Lower Grades Filipino publication of the USLS-IS.
- IS Yearbook – The official Yearbook of the USLS-IS.
- Publikasyong Ang Layag – The official Upper Grades Filipino publication of the USLS-IS.
- The Lasallian Crossroads – The official Upper Grades English publication of the USLS-IS.

=== Integrated School Clubs ===
- Integrated School Student Government (ISSG) – The Integrated School Student Government is the governing body of all student activities for the Integrated School, responsible for implementing policies and activities for the student body.
- BEU Productions – An events management club that specializes in providing support for various productions.
- BEU Drumbeaters – Official drumbeaters of the school started in 2008.
- IS Campus Peer Ministry – A religious organization made up of student volunteers of the USLS-IS.
- USLS-IS Senior Red Cross Youth Council – The USLS-IS chapter of the Red Cross Youth Negros Occidental.
- Young Christians Environmental Resuce+ – An environmental advocacy organization of USLS-IS established in 1995.
- Explorer Scouts – A subsidiary of the Boy Scouts of the Philippines in USLS-IS.
- Girl Scouts of the Philippines – A subsidiary of the Girl Scouts of the Philippines in USLS-IS.

Crossroads, Ang Layag, Green Beacon and Ang Luntiang Tanglaw
- Type: Free, every semester
- Format: Tabloid and Newsletter
- Owner: USLS-IS Editorial Staff
- Headquarters: USLS-IS Publication Office
- Circulation: School-wide

== The Community Services Center ==
The Community Services Center serves as a venue for the students to be exposed to the reality of daily living in welfare institutions, public schools, urban squatter areas and puroks, and in the process, elicit in them the desire to fulfill the need for creative and meaningful involvement so as to meet some of the social needs of the marginalized communities.

The underlying thrust of the program is the inculcation of Christian values and moral principles which propel each individual to be more conscious of the needs of his fellowmen and contribute one's talents and wealth for the upliftment of the quality of life in the community.

It provides the students with concrete and meaningful opportunities to relate school experiences to one's immediate community, applying the theories gained from the different subjects taught in school. Here are different organizations under the Community Services Center.

- Kabulig Organization
- Gawad Kalinga
- Abyan
- Lasallian Youth for Peace Corps (LSYPC)
- Bahay Pag-asa
- Drug Watch
- Kasanagan Youth
- Junior Amity Youth

== Notable alumni ==
- Rafael M Alunan III — former Secretary of the Interior and Local Government
- Francis Arnaiz- former basketball player for Barangay Ginebra San Miguel and Toyota Super Corollas in the Philippine Basketball Association
- Jeffrei Chan - professional basketball player for Rain or Shine Elasto Painters in the Philippine Basketball Association
- Rafael Coscoluella - former governor of Negros Occidental
- Bro. Rolando Ramos Dizon, FSC – De La Salle Brother, chairman of the Commission on Higher Education (Philippines)
- Daniel Lacson Jr. -former governor of Negros Occidental, former Government Service Insurance System Chairman, former President of Negros Navigation
- Franz Ontal - Head of inspector training at the Organisation for the Prohibition of Chemical Weapons (OPCW), he was serving in this capacity when the organization won the 2013 Nobel Peace Prize
- Carlo Piccio - Olympic swimmer
- Monico Puentevella - former Mayor of Bacolod, former congressman representing Bacolod, former commissioner of the Philippine Sports Commission
- Joel Torre – film and television actor
- Monsour del Rosario - taekwondo champion, film and TV actor, congressman representing the first district of Makati
- Christian Vasquez - model, film and television actor
- Jose Maria Zubiri Jr. - Governor of the Province of Bukidnon, former congressman representing the third district of Bukidnon
