= Kim Fajardo =

Filipino volleyball player (born 1993)

Kim Alano Fajardo
Personal information
- Nicknames: Kim, Kimmy, KAF
- Nationality: Filipino
- Born: September 30, 1993 (age 33)
- Home town: Calatagan, Batangas, Philippines
- Education: De La Salle University
- Height: 5 ft 8 in (1.73 m)
- Weight: 60 kg (132 lb)
- Spike: 275 cm (108 in)
- Block: 265 cm (104 in)

Volleyball information
- Position: Setter
- Current club: PLDT High Speed Hitters

Career
- Years: Team
- 2015: Meralco Power Spikers
- 2016–2023: F2 Logistics Cargo Movers
- 2024–present: PLDT High Speed Hitters

National team
- Years: Team
- 2008, 2017–2021: Philippines

Kim Alano Fajardo (born September 30, 1993) is a Filipino professional volleyball player . She was the team captain of the De La Salle University women's volleyball team for Season 78 and 79. She currently plays for the PLDT High Speed Hitters in the Premier Volleyball League (PVL).

== Career ==
Fajardo first played volleyball when she was in Grade 2. In high school, she was a member of the UST Junior Golden Tigresses, where she played as a utility spiker, later converted to setter after Rhea Katrina Dimaculangan graduated high school. She was teammates with Alyssa Valdez in UST and the Philippine girls' volleyball team for the 2008 Asian Youth Girls Volleyball Championship where the Philippines finished in 8th place.

In 2010, Fajardo enrolled at De La Salle University for her collegiate studies. Although enrolled as a college freshman, Fajardo had to sit out from the 2010 DLSU Lady Spikers roster to serve one year of residency for transferring from one UAAP school to another as imposed by the UAAP. As a member of the DLSU Lady Spikers, she has won three UAAP indoor volleyball (UAAP Season 75, Season 78, and Season 79) and one UAAP beach volleyball (UAAP Season 78) championships, respectively. She was named Best Setter three times in her UAAP career, a feat only Jamenea Ferrer of the Ateneo Lady Eagles has achieved before her. She was the Best Setter in the UAAP in Season 76, Season 78, and Season 79 respectively. She is also named the Most Valuable Player of the beach volleyball tournament in the UAAP Season 78. Although Fajardo has graduated from De La Salle University on June 18, 2015, with a Bachelor of Arts degree (major in Sports Management), she decided to play her final year of eligibility in the 79th season of the UAAP as the team captain for the second straight season. She was eventually named the Best Setter and the Best Server and also carried the young team to their second straight championship.

Fajardo was named Best Server in the 2014 Philippine National Games and Most Valuable Player in the 2015 edition. She also won two times the Best Setter award in the PVF Intercollegiate Volleyball Championship in 2013 and 2015. In July 2016, Fajardo was given a golden ticket and was chosen as part of the Philippine Super Liga All-Stars to represent the country in the 2016 FIVB Volleyball Women's Club World Championship where she ended up as sixth in the Best Setter race.

With F2 Logistics Cargo Movers, Fajardo won the 2016 PSL All-Filipino Conference and 2017 PSL Grand Prix Conference championships and Fajardo was awarded the Best Setter for both conferences.

== Personal life ==
Fajardo was formerly in a relationship with fellow volleyball player Carmela Tunay. Their relationship lasted for seven years until it ended sometime during the COVID-19 pandemic in the early 2020s.

== Awards ==
=== Individuals ===
- UAAP Season 72 Girls' Volleyball "Best Setter"
- 2013 PVF Intercollegiate Championship "Best Setter"
- UAAP Season 76 "Best Setter"
- 2014 Philippine National Games "Best Server"
- 2015 PVF Intercollegiate Championship "Best Setter"
- 2015 Philippine National Games "Most Valuable Player"
- UAAP Season 78 "Best Setter"
- UAAP Season 78 Beach Volleyball "Most Valuable Player"
- 2016 PSL All-Filipino "Best Setter"
- 2016 PSL Grand Prix "Best Setter"
- UAAP Season 79 "Best Setter"
- UAAP Season 79 "Best Server"
- 2017 PSL Grand Prix "Best Setter"
- 2018 PSL Grand Prix "Best Setter"
- 2018 PSL Invitational Cup "Best Setter"
- 2018 PSL All-Filipino Conference "Best Setter"

=== Collegiate ===
- 2013 UAAP Season 75 volleyball tournaments - Champion, with De La Salle Lady Spikers
- 2014 UAAP Season 76 volleyball tournaments - Silver medal, with De La Salle Lady Spikers
- 2015 UAAP Season 77 volleyball tournaments - Silver medal, with De La Salle Lady Spikers
- 2016 UAAP Season 78 volleyball tournaments - Champion, with De La Salle Lady Spikers
- 2017 UAAP Season 79 volleyball tournaments - Champion, with De La Salle Lady Spikers

=== Clubs ===
- 2016 Philippine Super Liga All-Filipino - Champion, with F2 Logistics Cargo Movers
- 2016 Philippine Super Liga Grand Prix - Bronze medal, with F2 Logistics Cargo Movers
- 2017 Philippine Super Liga All-Filipino - Silver medal, with F2 Logistics Cargo Movers
- 2017 Philippine Super Liga Grand Prix - Champion, with F2 Logistics Cargo Movers
- 2018 Philippine SuperLiga Grand Prix - Silver medal, with F2 Logistics Cargo Movers
- 2018 Philippine Super Liga Invitational Cup - Champion, with F2 Logistics Cargo Movers
- 2018 Philippine Super Liga All-Filipino - Silver medal, with F2 Logistics Cargo Movers
- 2023 Premier Volleyball League First All-Filipino Conference - Bronze medal, with F2 Logistics Cargo Movers
- 2025 Premier Volleyball League on Tour – Champion, with PLDT High Speed Hitters

=== Others ===
- DLSAA Lasallian Sports Achievement Award (2017)
