= 2025 Premier Volleyball League season =

The 2025 Premier Volleyball League season may refer to:

- 2024–25 Premier Volleyball League season, held during the first half of 2025
- 2025–26 Premier Volleyball League season, held during the second half of 2025
