= Vange Alinsug =

Filipino volleyball player (born 2003)

Personal information
- Full name: Evangeline Alinsug
- Nationality: Filipinos
- Born: February 18, 2003 (age 23)
- Home town: Catmon, Cebu, Philippines
- Education: National University
- Height: 5 ft 7 in (170 cm)

Volleyball information
- Position: Outside Hitter
- Current team: NU Lady Bulldogs
- Number: 6

Evangeline Alinsug (born February 18, 2003) is a Filipino volleyball player. She is a currently playing with NU Lady Bulldogs in the UAAP.

== Career ==
Alinsug made her first appearance with the Lady Bulldogs in the 2022 Shakey's Super League Pre-season championship, where they won the title against De La Salle Lady Spikers in the finals.

In 2023, she made her first appearance with her team in the UAAP, where they bagged silver medal in the UAAP Season 85 after losing to De La Salle Lady Spikers in the finals.

In 2024, they get the championship title back on their side after beating UST Golden Tigresses in the Finals. After that, they represented the Philippines national team in the 2024 Asian Women's Volleyball Club Championship playing under the club name Monolith Sky Risers.

In 2025, they get their back-to-back championship in the UAAP after beating La Salle in the finals.

== Clubs ==
- (Philippines) Monolith Sky Risers (2024)

== Awards ==
=== Individual ===
Year	League	Season/Conference	Award	Ref
2020	UAAP (juniors')	82	Finals MVP	
2025	UAAP (women's)	87	Finals MVP with Shaira Jardio	

=== High School ===
Year	League	Season/Conference	Title	Ref
2019	UAAP	81	Runner-up	
2019	NCR Palaro		Champions	
2019	Palarong Pambansa		Champions	
2020	UAAP	82	Champions	

=== Collegiate ===
Year	League	Season/Conference	Title	Ref
2022	SSL	Pre-Season	Champions	
2023	UAAP	85	Runner-Up	
2023	SSL	Pre-Season	Champions	
2024	UAAP	86	Champions	
2024	UNIGAMES		Champions	
2024	SSL	Invitationals	Champions	
2024	SSL	Pre-Season	Champions	
2025	UAAP	87	Champions	
