= Erin Pangilinan =

Filipino volleyball player

Personal information
- Full name: Erin May Pangilinan
- Nationality: Filipino
- Born: October 12, 2001 (age 25)
- Home town: San Juan, Batangas, Philippines
- Education: National University
- Height: 1.70 m (5 ft 7 in)

Volleyball information
- Position: Opposite hitter Middle blocker
- Current team: Creamline Cool Smashers

Career
- Years: Team
- 2025–2026: Cignal HD Spikers
- 2026–present: Creamline Cool Smashers

Erin May Pangilinan (born October 12, 2001) is a Filipino professional volleyball player who is an opposite hitter and middle blocker for the Creamline Cool Smashers of the Premier Volleyball League (PVL). She played for the NU Lady Bulldogs in college.

== Career ==
=== Collegiate ===
Pangilinan played for the Lady Bulldogs of the National University in the University Athletic Association of the Philippines (UAAP).

She played her last playing year in the UAAP in Season 87, where they bagged their back-to-back championship title against De La Salle Lady Spikers.

=== Club ===
Pangilinan was the 6th overall pick in the 2025 Premier Volleyball League draft joining the Cignal HD Spikers and is played with them in the 2025 Premier Volleyball League on Tour as an opposite spiker and a middle blocker.

In 2026, she joined Creamline Cool Smashers following the disbandment of Cignal HD Spikers.

== Awards ==
=== Individual ===
Year	Conference	Award	Ref
2023	SSL; Pre-Season	1st Best Middle Blocker	

=== Highschool ===
==== NSNU Lady Bullpups ====
Year	League	Season/Conference	Title	Ref
2015	UAAP	77	Champions	
2016	UAAP	78	Champions	
2017	UAAP	79	Champions	
2017	RVL girls' U18		Champions	
2018	UAAP	80	Champions	
2019	UAAP	81	Runner-up	
2019	Palarong Pambansa		Champions	
2020	UAAP	82	Champions	

=== Collegiate ===
Year	League	Season/Conference	Title	Ref
2022	UAAP	84	Champions	
2022	SSL	Pre-Season	Champions	
2023	UAAP	85	Runner-Up	
2023	SSL	Pre-Season	Champions	
2024	UAAP	86	Champions	
2024	SSL	Invitationals	Champions	
2024	SSL	Pre-Season	Champions	
2024	UNIGAMES	Pre-Season	Champions	
2025	UAAP	87	Champions	

=== Clubs ===
Year	Season/Conference	Club	Title	Ref
2026	All-Filipino	Cignal HD Spikers	Runner-up	
