= Sheena Toring =

Filipino volleyball player

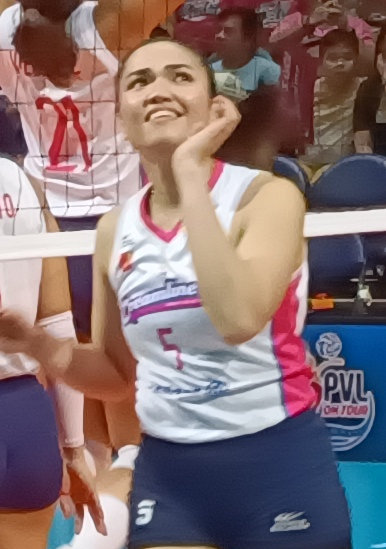
- Toring in 2025

Personal information
- Full name: Sheena Angela Toring
- Nationality: Filipino
- Born: May 8, 2001 (age 25)
- Home town: Valencia, Bukidnon, Philippines
- Education: National University
- Height: 1.78 m (5 ft 10 in)

Volleyball information
- Position: Middle blocker
- Current team: Creamline Cool Smashers

Career
- Years: Team
- 2025–present: Creamline Cool Smashers

Sheena Angela Toring (born May 8, 2001) is a Filipino professional volleyball player who is a middle blocker for the Creamline Cool Smashers of the Premier Volleyball League (PVL). In college, she played for the NU Lady Bulldogs.

== Personal life ==
Toring is a native of Bukidnon province. Her parents are both working abroad.

She is currently taking a Tourism degree at National University.

== Career ==
=== Collegiate ===
Toring made her first game appearance with NU Lady Bulldogs in UAAP Season 84 women's where they end-up winning the title after 65 years of championship drought. In the same season, she bagged the "Second Best Middle Blocker" award.

This was followed by 2022 Shakey's Super League Collegiate Pre-Season Championship where they bagged another the championship title for their school. She also bagged the "Second Best Middle Blocker" award in this tournament.

In UAAP Season 85, she suffered an injury in their first game of the finals against La Salle, so she wasn't able to play the rest of the finals.

Toring returned to volleyball after an injury in Shakey's Super League, where she helped the NU Lady Bulldogs defend their championship title. Followed by UAAP Season 86 women's volleyball tournament, she also helped in reclaiming the title they lost last season by delivering the championship point.

=== Pro League ===
She was the 12th overall pick in the 2025 Premier Volleyball League draft joining the Creamline Cool Smashers and is now playing with them in the 2025 Premier Volleyball League on Tour as a middle blocker.

== Awards ==
=== Individual ===
Year	League	Season/Conference	Award	Ref
2016	UAAP	78 (Junior's)	Best Blocker	
2022	UAAP	84 (Women's)	2nd Best Middle Blocker	
2022	SSL	Pre-Season	2nd Best Middle Blocker	

=== Highschool ===
==== NSNU Lady Bullpups ====
Year	League	Season/Conference	Title	Ref
2015	UAAP	77	Champions	
2016	UAAP	78	Champions	
2017	UAAP	79	Champions	
2017	RVL girls' U18		Champions	
2018	UAAP	80	Champions	
2019	UAAP	81	Runner-up	
2019	Palarong Pambansa		Champions	
2020	UAAP	82	Champions	

=== Collegiate ===
Year	League	Season/Conference	Title	Ref
2022	UAAP	84	Champions	
2022	SSL	Pre-Season	Champions	
2023	UAAP	85	Runner-Up	
2023	SSL	Pre-Season	Champions	
2024	UAAP	86	Champions	
2024	SSL	Invitationals	Champions	
2024	SSL	Pre-Season	Champions	
2024	UNIGAMES	Pre-Season	Champions	
2025	UAAP	87	Champions	

=== Clubs ===
Year	Season/Conference	Club	Title	Ref
2025	on Tour	Creamline Cool Smashers	Bronze	
2025	Invitational	Creamline Cool Smashers	Bronze	
2026	All-Filipino	Creamline Cool Smashers	Champions	
