= Bella Belen =

Filipino volleyball player (born 2002)

Personal information
- Full name: Mhicaela Santos Belen
- Born: June 29, 2002 (age 24) Manila, Philippines
- Education: National University
- Height: 1.73 m (5 ft 8 in)
- Weight: 65 kg (143 lb)
- Spike: 264 cm (104 in)
- Block: 241 cm (95 in)

Volleyball information
- Position: Outside hitter
- Current team: Capital1 Solar Spikers
- Number: 4

Career
- Years: Team
- 2018: BaliPure Purest Water Defenders
- 2021: Rebisco (AVC)
- 2025–: Capital1 Solar Spikers

National team
- Years: Team
- 2023–: Philippines
Honours
Women's volleyball
Representing Philippines
Asian Nations Cup
Silver medal – second place	2025 Hanoi	Team
SEA V.League
Bronze medal – third place	2024 Vĩnh Phúc / Nakhon Ratchasima	Team
Bronze medal – third place	2025 Nakhon Ratchasima / Ninh Bình	Team

Mhicaela "Bella" Santos Belen is a Filipino volleyball player. She is currently playing as an outside hitter for Alas Pilipinas, a former NU Lady Bulldog and is now a new recruit of the Capital1 Solar Spikers.

== Early life and education ==
Bella Belen was born on June 29, 2002, in Manila, Philippines. Belen studied high school at Nazareth School until 2020, before moving up to the institution's affiliate college National University where she obtained a psychology degree in May 2025.

== Career ==
=== High school ===
Belen entered the Nazareth School,the high school department of the National University (NU), in 2014. However it was only in UAAP Season 78 when she would play for the NU Lady Bullpups. The team won the girls title on that season, the second consecutive title.

In Season 80 in 2017, Belen earned her first MVP award. Nazareth's title streak ended in a Season 81 when they lost to De La Salle Santiago Zobel School. In Season 82, they reclaimed the title with an undefeated 12–0 record. Belen was named best outside hitter and was given her second MVP award.

=== College ===
Belen aspired to attend the De La Salle University (DLSU) and was in contact with the school's coach Ramil de Jesus. However, Belen decided to go with the National University instead citing concerns of having to compete for playing time with other DLSU players. In 2022, Belen joined the NU Lady Bulldogs.

The Bulldogs in Belen's inaugural year won the title in the UAAP Season 84 after 65 years of title drought with a perfect 16–0 season sweep. She was also conferred the Best Rookie of the Year and Most Valuable Player awards becoming the first woman in the history of the UAAP women's volleyball to receive both awards in the same season. In addition, she made a record as she scored eight service aces, the most services aces in a match in the UAAP women's division, against UP to tie Dzi Gervacio's eight in Ateneo's win coincidentally also against UP in UAAP Season 75 volleyball tournaments in 2013.

Belen and her teammates tried to defend their championship title, but ended with a runner-up finish in the UAAP Season 85, where they lost to the De La Salle Lady Spikers in the finals.

In 2024, Belen led her team to reclaim the title in the UAAP Season 86 after they swept the UST Golden Tigresses in a Finals Series. She also reclaimed the Most Valuable Player and 1st Best Outside Hitter awards in the same season, making her a two-time UAAP MVP.

In 2025, Belen became the team captain for the NU Lady Bulldogs. The Bulldogs won their second consecutive title, defeating the DLSU Lady Spikers in the finals series of UAAP Season 87. She also became a three-time UAAP MVP. Only Monica Aleta and Alyssa Valdez are the other women's volleyball players to be given the same recognition thrice. In recognition of her efforts, NU retired her jersey number 4 in September, making her the first NU player and the third player in a UAAP school to receive the honor, following Rachel Daquis of Far Eastern University and Manilla Santos of DLSU.

=== Club ===
While still a high schooler, Belen played for the BaliPure Purest Water Defenders at the 2018 Reinforced Conference of the Premier Volleyball League along with Alyssa Solomon.

In 2021, Belen played for the Philippines national team which competed under the club name "Rebisco" in the Asian Women's Club Volleyball Championship. The team finished last place.

Belen later returned to the PVL in 2025, now as a fully functioning professional league in the Philippines, where she got drafted to the Capital1 Solar Spikers as the No.1 overall PVL Draft Pick. She made her debut for Capital1 at the 2025 Reinforced Conference. Shola Alvarez gave Belen the right to wear jersey No. 4, the same number Belen wore in college.

=== National team ===
Belen has been part of the Philippines national team which played at the 2023 and 2024 SEA Women's V.League She also played at the 2025 AVC Women's Volleyball Nations Cup.

Amidst disputes involving the PNVF, Belen begged off from national team duties in 2026, skipping the upcoming 2026 AVC Women's Volleyball Nations Cup amongst other scheduled competitions.

== Personal life ==
Belen also has a younger sister named Ghenievib, who is a current member of NSNU Bullpups and plays libero just like she did.

== Clubs ==
- (Philippines) BaliPure Purest Water Defenders (2018)
- Rebisco Philippines (2021)
- (Philippines) Capital1 Solar Spikers (2025–present)

== Awards ==
=== Individual ===
Year	League	Award	Ref
2018	UAAP S80 (Junior's)	MVP (Season)	
2020	UAAP S82 (Junior's)	MVP (Season)	
2020	UAAP S82 (Junior's)	1st Best Outside Hitter	
2022	UAAP S84 (Women's)	MVP (Season)	
2022	UAAP S84 (Women's)	Rookie of the Year	
2022	UAAP S84 (Women's)	1st Best Outside Hitter	
2022	SSL; Pre-Season	2nd Best Outside Hitter	
2023	SSL; Pre-Season	1st Best Outside Hitter	
2024	S86 (Women's)	MVP (Season)	
2024	S86 (Women's)	1st Best Outside Hitter	
2024	SSL; Invitationals	MVP (Season)	
2024	SSL; Invitationals	1st Best Outside Hitter	
2024	SSL; Pre-Season	MVP (Season)	
2024	SSL; Pre-Season	1st Best Outside Hitter	
2025	UAAP S87 (Women's)	MVP (Season)	
2025	UAAP S87 (Women's)	1st Best Outside Hitter	
2025	UAAP S87 (Women's)	Best Server	
2025	UAAP S87 (Women's)	Exceptional Player	
2026	PVL; All-Filipino	Rookie of the Year	
2026	PVL; All-Filipino	1st Best Outside Hitter	

=== High School ===
Year	League	Season	Title	Ref
2015	UAAP	77	Champions	
2016	UAAP	78	Champions	
2017	UAAP	79	Champions	
2017	RVL girls' U18		Champions	
2018	UAAP	80	Champions	
2019	UAAP	81	Runner-up	
2019	NCR Palaro		Champions	
2019	Palarong Pambansa		Champions	
2020	UAAP	82	Champions	

=== Collegiate ===
Year	League	Season/Conference	Title	Ref
2022	UAAP	84	Champions	
2022	SSL	Pre-Season	Champions	
2023	UAAP	85	Runner-Up	
2023	SSL	Pre-Season	Champions	
2024	UAAP	86	Champions	
2024	UNIGAMES	Pre-Season	Champions	
2024	SSL	Invitationals	Champions	
2024	SSL	Pre-Season	Champions	
2025	UAAP	87	Champions	

=== International ===
==== Philippine women's national team ====
Year	League		Title	Ref
2019	ASEAN School Games		Runner-up	
2024	SEA V.League	1st Leg	3rd place	
2024	SEA V.League	2nd Leg	3rd place	
2025	AVC Women's Nation Cup		Runner-up	
2025	SEA V.League	1st Leg	3rd place	
2025	SEA V.League	2nd Leg	3rd place	
