= 2026 Creamline Cool Smashers season =

The 2026 Creamline Cool Smashers season may refer to:

- 2025–26 Creamline Cool Smashers season
- 2026–27 Creamline Cool Smashers season
