= 2025–26 Creamline Cool Smashers season =

Eighth season of the Creamline Cool Smashers

The 2025–26 Creamline Cool Smashers season was the eighth season of the Creamline Cool Smashers in the Premier Volleyball League (PVL).

In the PVL on Tour, Creamline made the final round once more on July 29 following Chery Tiggo's loss against the Zus Coffee Thunderbelles. In the quarterfinals, the Creamline swept the Farm Fresh Foxies but lost to PLDT in the semifinals in a five-set match. It marked the first time since the 2022 Reinforced Conference in which Creamline failed to make the championship. They then swept the Cignal HD Spikers to claim the bronze medal for the conference.

In the Invitational Conference, Creamline settled for a fourth place in the prelims with a 2–3 record and 7 points, still enough to advance to the bronze medal match. They then swept Chery Tiggo to keep their podium streak alive at 19 conferences.

For the Reinforced Conference, Creamline brought in Courtney Schwan as their foreign player. After finishing fourth in the prelims with a 5–3 record and 17 points, the team was once again matched against rivals Petro Gazz. The Cool Smashers lost to the Angels in four sets, marking the first time in franchise history that the team failed to make at least the semifinals, putting an end to their aforementioned podium streak.

The lead-up to the All-Filipino Conference saw multiple departues, most notably longtime Creamline member Pau Soriano, while the team had a single acquisition ahead of the All-Filipino Conference in Jen Nierva from the defunct Chery Tiggo Crossovers.

== Roster ==
Creamline Cool Smashers roster
No.	Nat.	Player	Pos.	Height	DOB	From
1	(Philippines)	Kyle Negrito	Setter	1.72 m (5 ft 8 in)	December 15, 1996 (age 29)	Far Eastern
2	(Philippines)	Alyssa Valdez (C)	Outside Hitter	1.74 m (5 ft 9 in)	June 29, 1993 (age 33)	Ateneo
3	(Philippines)	Michelle Gamit	Middle Blocker	1.73 m (5 ft 8 in)	May 9, 2000 (age 26)	St. Benilde
4	(Philippines)	Dij Rodriguez	Opposite Hitter	1.67 m (5 ft 6 in)	August 29, 1996 (age 29)	Southwestern
5	(Philippines)	Sheena Toring	Middle Blocker	1.78 m (5 ft 10 in)	May 28, 2001 (age 25)	National-U
6	(Philippines)	Jeanette Panaga	Middle Blocker	1.78 m (5 ft 10 in)	July 25, 1994 (age 31)	St. Benilde
7	(Philippines)	Michele Gumabao	Opposite Hitter	1.75 m (5 ft 9 in)	September 2, 1992 (age 33)	De La Salle
8	(Philippines)	Ella de Jesus	Libero / Outside Hitter	1.57 m (5 ft 2 in)	August 17, 1993 (age 32)	Ateneo
9	(Philippines)	Lorie Bernardo	Opposite Hitter	1.82 m (6 ft 0 in)	August 1, 2000 (age 25)	Philippines
11	(Philippines)	Kyla Atienza	Libero	1.67 m (5 ft 6 in)	April 12, 1997 (age 29)	Far Eastern
12	(Philippines)	Jia De Guzman	Setter	1.77 m (5 ft 10 in)	May 15, 1995 (age 31)	Ateneo
13	(Philippines)	Denden Lazaro-Revilla	Libero	1.65 m (5 ft 5 in)	January 21, 1992 (age 34)	Ateneo
14	(Philippines)	Bea de Leon	Middle Blocker	1.80 m (5 ft 11 in)	August 2, 1996 (age 29)	Ateneo
15	(Philippines)	Nica Celis	Middle Blocker	1.78 m (5 ft 10 in)	July 7, 2001 (age 25)	Philippines
17	(Philippines)	Rosemarie Vargas	Outside Hitter	1.70 m (5 ft 7 in)	December 12, 1992 (age 33)	Far Eastern
18	(Philippines)	Tots Carlos	Opposite Hitter	1.74 m (5 ft 9 in)	July 7, 1998 (age 28)	Philippines
19	(Philippines)	Bernadeth Pons	Outside Hitter	1.70 m (5 ft 7 in)	October 19, 1996 (age 29)	Far Eastern
22	(Philippines)	Jennifer Nierva	Libero	1.66 m (5 ft 5 in)	November 8, 1999 (age 26)	National-U
23	(Philippines)	Jema Galanza	Outside Hitter	1.70 m (5 ft 7 in)	November 28, 1996 (age 29)	Adamson
24	(Philippines) (Canada)	Aleiah Torres	Libero / Outside Hitter	1.63 m (5 ft 4 in)	September 24, 2001 (age 24)	Brock

Coaching staff

- Head coach:
  Sherwin Meneses
- Assistant coach:
  Karlo Martin Santos
  Ariel Morado Jr.
  Carl Bryan Vitug
  Lawrence Magadia
- Team statistician:
  Mark Alfafara

Team staff

- Team manager:
  Alan Acero
- Trainer:
  Mark Christopher Caron
- Utility:
  Sonny Cruz
  Eduardo Martinez

Medical staff

- Physiothrapist:
  Jigs Daguque
- Physical therapist:
  Haree Jan Rañeses

=== National team players ===
Players who were part of the Philippines women's national team were excluded from playing with the team due to various commitments. This affected the team's roster for both the PVL on Tour and Invitational Conference.

- Jia de Guzman

== Draft ==
Round	Pick	Player	Pos.	School
1	12	Sheena Toring	MB	NU
2	23	Nica Celis	MB	UP

== PVL on Tour ==
=== Preliminary round ===
==== Pool B standings ====
Pos	Team	Pld	W	L	Pts	SW	SL	SR	SPW	SPL	SPR	Qualification
1	Cignal HD Spikers	5	4	1	12	13	4	3.250	395	366	1.079	Final round
2	Creamline Cool Smashers	5	3	2	10	11	8	1.375	441	394	1.119	Final round
3	Chery Tiggo Crossovers	5	3	2	9	12	10	1.200	488	451	1.082	Knockout round
4	Zus Coffee Thunderbelles	5	3	2	7	12	12	1.000	512	503	1.018	Knockout round
5	Akari Chargers	5	2	3	6	9	11	0.818	420	460	0.913	Knockout round

Source: PVL.ph

==== Match log ====
2025 PVL on Tour preliminary round match log
Total: 3–2 (10 points)
June: 2–0 (6 points)

Match	Date	Opponent	Sets	Total	Location Attendance	Record	Pts	Report
1	June 22, 2025	Capital1	3–0	75–41	Chavit Coliseum; 5,569	1–0	3	P2
2	June 23, 2025	Akari	3–1	99–87	Chavit Coliseum; 4,996	2–0	6	P2

July: 1–2 (4 points)

Match	Date	Opponent	Sets	Total	Location Attendance	Record	Pts	Report
3	July 1, 2025	Cignal	0–3	66–78	Filoil Centre; 1,951	2–1	6	P2
4	July 19, 2025	Zus Coffee	2–3	105–111	City of Passi Arena; 2,174	2–2	7	P2
5	July 20, 2025	Chery Tiggo	3–1	94–80	City of Passi Arena; 2,597	3–2	10	P2

=== Final round ===
==== Bracket ====
Quarterfinals
August 7
1 PLDT	3
8 Zus Coffee	0
August 9
4 Creamline	3
5 Farm Fresh	0
August 7
2 Cignal	3
7 Akari	0
August 9
3 Nxled	0
6 Chery Tiggo	3

Semifinals
August 12
PLDT	3
Creamline	2
August 12
Cignal	1
Chery Tiggo	3

Championship
August 17
PLDT	3
Chery Tiggo	2
3rd place match
August 17
Creamline	3
Cignal	0

==== Match log ====
2025 PVL on Tour final round match log
Total: 2–1 (7 points)
Quarterfinals: 1–0 (3 points)

Date	Opponent	Sets	Total	Location Attendance	Report
August 9, 2025	Farm Fresh	3–0	76–62	PhilSports Arena; 3,162	P2

Semifinals: 0–1 (1 point)

Date	Opponent	Sets	Total	Location Attendance	Report
August 12, 2025	PLDT	2–3	101–108	Smart Araneta Coliseum; 3,709	P2

Third-place match: 1–0 (3 points)

Date	Opponent	Sets	Total	Location Attendance	Report
August 17, 2025	Cignal	3–0	79–61	SM Mall of Asia Arena; 7,882	P2

== Invitational Conference ==
=== Preliminary round ===
==== Standings ====
Pos	Team	Pld	W	L	Pts	SW	SL	SR	SPW	SPL	SPR	Qualification
2	Kobe Shinwa University	5	4	1	11	12	7	1.714	442	402	1.100	Championship match
3	Chery Tiggo Crossovers	5	3	2	9	11	9	1.222	430	425	1.012	3rd place match
4	Creamline Cool Smashers	5	2	3	7	11	11	1.000	482	460	1.048	3rd place match
5	Cignal HD Spikers	5	1	4	4	7	13	0.538	398	433	0.919	
6	Zus Coffee Thunderbelles	5	0	5	0	2	15	0.133	303	423	0.716	

Source: Premier Volleyball League

==== Match log ====
2025 PVL Invitational Conference preliminary round match log
Total: 2–3 (7 points)
August: 2–3 (7 points)

Match	Date	Opponent	Sets	Total	Location Attendance	Record	Pts	Report
– (Note: The result of Creamline's game against PLDT in the PVL on Tour semifinals was carried over to the Invitational Conference preliminary round. It is shown for the purpose of completeness.)	August 12, 2025	PLDT	2–3	101–108	PhilSports Arena; 3,709	0–1	1	P2
1	August 21, 2025	Cignal	3–2	109–86	PhilSports Arena; 2,182	1–1	3	P2
2	August 23, 2025	Chery Tiggo	2–3	103–70	PhilSports Arena; 2,744	1–2	4	P2
3	August 26, 2025	Kobe Shinwa	1–3	94–100	PhilSports Arena; 644	1–3	4	P2
4	August 29, 2025	Zus Coffee	3–0	75–54	Smart Araneta Coliseum; 810	2–3	7	P2

=== Final round ===
==== Match log ====
2025 PVL Invitational Conference final round match log
Total: 1–0 (3 points)
Third-place match: 1–0 (3 points)

Date	Opponent	Sets	Total	Location Attendance	Report
August 31, 2025	Chery Tiggo	3–0	75–50	Smart Araneta Coliseum; 2,609	P2

== Reinforced Conference ==
=== Preliminary round ===
==== Standings ====
Pos	Team	Pld	W	L	Pts	SW	SL	SR	SPW	SPL	SPR	Qualification
2	Zus Coffee Thunderbelles	8	7	1	20	21	8	2.625	688	596	1.154	Quarterfinals
3	PLDT High Speed Hitters	8	6	2	18	19	9	2.111	669	591	1.132	Quarterfinals
4	Creamline Cool Smashers	8	5	3	17	20	12	1.667	729	661	1.103	Quarterfinals
5	Petro Gazz Angels	8	5	3	14	17	14	1.214	718	669	1.073	Quarterfinals
6	Cignal Super Spikers	8	5	3	13	16	14	1.143	672	650	1.034	Quarterfinals

Source: Premier Volleyball League

==== Match log ====
2025 PVL Reinforced Conference preliminary round match log
Total: 5–3 (17 points)
First round: 3–2 (10 points)

Match	Date	Opponent	Sets	Total	Location Attendance	Record	Pts	Report
1	October 11, 2025	Akari	2–3	113–116	City of Dasmariñas Arena; 4,183	0–1	1	P2
2	October 14, 2025	Petro Gazz	3–1	92–86	Smart Araneta Coliseum; 2,085	1–1	4	P2
3	October 18, 2025	Galeries Tower	3–0	75–35	Capital Arena; 6,491	2–1	7	P2
4	October 23, 2025	Zus Coffee	1–3	86–100	Filoil Centre; 1,850	2–2	7	P2
5	October 28, 2025	Chery Tiggo	3–1	98–88	Filoil Centre; 1,643	3–2	10	P2

Second round: 2–1 (7 points)

Match	Date	Opponent	Sets	Total	Location Attendance	Record	Pts	Report
6	November 6, 2025	Nxled	3–1	95–72	Filoil Centre; 568	4–2	13	P2
7	November 13, 2025	Choco Mucho	3–0	75–57	Smart Araneta Coliseum; 4,117	5–2	16	P2
8	November 18, 2025	Cignal	2–3	95–107	Ynares Center Montalban; 2,555	5–3	17	P2

=== Final round ===
==== Bracket ====
Quarterfinals
November 24
Farm Fresh	0
Akari	3
November 24
Creamline	1
Petro Gazz	3
November 24
Zus Coffee	3
Capital1	0
November 24
PLDT	3
Cignal	1

Semifinals
November 27
Akari	2
Petro Gazz	3
November 27
Zus Coffee	3
PLDT	0

Championship
November 30
Petro Gazz	3
Zus Coffee	1
3rd-place match
November 30
Akari	3
PLDT	2

==== Match log ====
2025 PVL Reinforced Conference final round match log
Total: 0–1 (0 points)
Quarterfinals: 0–1 (0 points)

Date	Opponent	Sets	Total	Location Attendance	Report
November 24, 2025	Petro Gazz	1–3	81–91	Smart Araneta Coliseum	P2

== All-Filipino Conference ==
=== Preliminary round ===
==== Standings ====
Pos	Team	Pld	W	L	Pts	SW	SL	SR	SPW	SPL	SPR	Qualification
1	PLDT High Speed Hitters	9	7	2	20	22	11	2.000	769	698	1.102	Qualifying round
2	Cignal Super Spikers	9	6	3	20	22	11	2.000	772	687	1.124	Qualifying round
3	Creamline Cool Smashers	9	6	3	16	20	16	1.250	700	662	1.057	Qualifying round
4	Farm Fresh Foxies	9	5	4	17	22	16	1.375	850	771	1.102	Qualifying round
5	Nxled Chameleons	9	5	4	15	20	16	1.250	810	773	1.048	Play-in tournament semifinals

Source: Premier Volleyball League

==== Match log ====
2026 PVL All-Filipino Conference preliminary round match log
Total: 6–3 (16 points)
February: 3–1 (9 points)

Match	Date	Opponent	Sets	Total	Location Attendance	Record	Pts	Report
1	February 5, 2026	PLDT	0–3	62–75	Filoil Centre; 2,400	0–1	0	P2
2	February 10, 2026	Choco Mucho	3–1	94–86	SM Mall of Asia Arena; 12,571	1–1	3	P2
3	February 17, 2026	Zus Coffee	3–1	97–76	Filoil Centre; 4,569	2–1	6	P2
4	February 21, 2026	Capital1	3–0	76–62	Filoil Centre; 3,023	3–1	9	P2

March: 3–2 (7 points)

Match	Date	Opponent	Sets	Total	Location Attendance	Record	Pts	Report
5	March 3, 2026	Galeries Tower	3–1	92–80	Filoil Centre; 2,246	1–0	12	P2
6	March 7, 2026	Nxled	3–2	102–97	Filoil Centre; 2,989	2–0	14	P2
7	March 12, 2026	Akari	1–3	91–93	Filoil Centre; 1,384	2–1	14	P2
8	March 17, 2026	Farm Fresh	1–3	86–93	Filoil Centre; 2,605	2–2	14	P2
9	March 21, 2026	Cignal	3–2	107–106	Filoil Centre; 3,331	3–2	16	P2

=== Qualifying round ===
==== Match log ====
2026 PVL All-Filipino Conference qualifying round match log
Total: 0–1 (1 points)
Qualifying round: 0–1 (1 points)

Date	Opponent	Sets	Total	Location Attendance	Report
March 26, 2026	Cignal	2–3	109–109	Smart Araneta Coliseum; 4,574	P2

=== Play-in tournament ===
==== Pool B ====
Play-in pool B quarterfinal
7	Choco Mucho	3
10	Zus Coffee	2

Play-in pool B semifinal
6	Akari	3
7	Choco Mucho	2

Play-in pool B final
3	Creamline	3
6	Akari	1

==== Match log ====
2026 PVL All-Filipino Conference play-in tournament match log
Total: 1–0 (3 points)
Play-in tournament: 1–0 (3 points)

Date	Opponent	Sets	Total	Location Attendance	Report
April 7, 2026	Akari	3–1	91–84	Filoil Centre; 3,864	P2

=== Semifinal round ===
==== Standings ====
Pos	Team	Pld	W	L	Pts	SW	SL	SR	SPW	SPL	SPR	Qualification
1	Cignal Super Spikers	3	2	1	6	6	5	1.200	248	207	1.198	Finals
2	Creamline Cool Smashers	3	2	1	5	7	6	1.167	270	289	0.934	Finals
3	PLDT High Speed Hitters	3	1	2	4	6	6	1.000	276	266	1.038	Third place series
4	Farm Fresh Foxies	3	1	2	3	5	7	0.714	245	278	0.881	Third place series

Source: Premier Volleyball League

==== Match log ====
2026 PVL All-Filipino Conference semifinal round match log
Total: 2–1 (5 points)
Semifinals: 2–1 (5 points)

Match	Date	Opponent	Sets	Total	Location Attendance	Record	Pts	Report
1	April 11, 2026	PLDT	3–2	111–111	SM Mall of Asia Arena; 9,940	1–0	2	P2
2	April 14, 2026	Cignal	1–3	70–88	SM Mall of Asia Arena; 7,424	1–1	2	P2
3	April 16, 2026	Farm Fresh	3–1	89–90	Filoil Centre; 3,622	2–1	5	P2

=== Finals ===
==== Match log ====
2026 PVL All-Filipino Conference final round match log
Total: 2–0 (5 points)
Finals: 2–0 (5 points)

Match	Date	Opponent	Sets	Total	Location Attendance	Record	Pts	Report
1	April 21, 2026	Cignal	3–0	75–56	Smart Araneta Coliseum; 8,183	1–0	3	P2
2	April 23, 2026	Cignal	3–2	103–100	Smart Araneta Coliseum; 17,358	2–0	5	P2

== Transactions ==
=== Additions ===
Player	Date signed	Previous team	Ref.
Sheena Toring	June 13, 2025	NU Lady Bulldogs (UAAP)	
Nica Celis	June 13, 2025	UP Fighting Maroons (UAAP)	
Michelle Gamit	July 1, 2025	Zus Coffee Thunderbelles	
Michelle Morente	October 4, 2025	Petro Gazz Angels	
Jen Nierva	January 9, 2026	Chery Tiggo EV Crossovers	

=== Subtractions ===
Player	New team	Ref.
Theo Bea Bonafe	Akari Chargers	
Mafe Galanza	Free agent	
Rizza Mandapat	Free agent	
Michelle Morente	Free agent	
Pau Soriano	Free agent	

=== Foreign guest player ===
Team	Foreign player	Moving from	Ref.
Creamline Cool Smashers	(United States) Courtney Schwan	(United States) Orlando Valkyries	
