= Detdet Pepito =

Filipino volleyball player

Bernadett Pepito

Personal information
- Full name: Ma. Bernadett Gatchalian Pepito
- Nickname: Detdet
- Nationality: Filipino
- Born: October 7, 2002 (age 24)
- Hometown: Quezon City, Philippines
- Height: 1.57 m (5 ft 2 in)
- Education: University of Santo Tomas

Volleyball information
- Position: Libero
- Current team: Capital1 Solar Spikers

Career
Years	Teams
2026-present	Capital1 Solar Spikers

Ma. Bernadett Gatchalian Pepito (born October 27, 2002) is a Filipino professional volleyball player. She is currently playing for the Capital1 Solar Spikers in Premier Volleyball League (PVL).

== Career ==
=== College ===
Pepito made her first game appearance with the UST Golden Tigresses in the UAAP in Season 84, where the team finished in fourth place after their loss against the Ateneo Lady Eagles in the stepladder semifinals. In 2023, they finished in fourth place in UAAP Season 85 after their loss against De La Salle Lady Spikers. She was awarded Best Libero that year.

In UAAP Season 86, Pepito once again received the Best Libero award, while the UST Golden Tigresses entered the finals and placed second against the NU Lady Bulldogs.

== Personal life ==
She took an Elementary Education degree at the University of Santo Tomas and graduated in 2025.

== Awards ==
=== Individuals ===
Year	League	Season/Conference	Award	Ref.
2016	UAAP (junior's)	78	Best Receiver	
2017	UAAP (junior's)	79	Best Libero	
2018	UAAP (junior's)	80	Best Libero	
2019	UAAP (junior's)	81	Best Libero	
2020	UAAP (junior's)	82	Best Libero	
2022	SSL	Pre-Season	Best Libero	
2023	UAAP (women's)	85	Best Libero	
2023	SSL	Invitationals	Best Libero	
2023	SSL	Pre-Season	Best Libero	
2024	UAAP (women's)	86	Best Libero	
2024	V-League	Collegiate	Best Libero	
2025	Marinera Cup	Collegiate	Best Libero	

=== High School ===
Year	League	Season	Title	Ref
2016	UAAP	78	Runner-up	
2017	UAAP	79	Runner-up	
2018	UAAP	80	Runner-up	
2019	UAAP	81	3rd place	
2019	UAAP	82	3rd place	

=== Collegiate ===
==== UST Golden Tigresses ====
Year	League	Season/Conference	Title	Ref
2023	SSL	Invitationals	3rd place	
2023	SSL	Pre-Season	Runner-up	
2024	UAAP	86	Runner-up	
2024	V-League	Collegiate	Champion	
2025	UAAP	87	3rd place	
2025	SSL	Pre-Season	Runner-up	
2025	Marinera Cup	Collegiate	Champion	
2026	UAAP	88	3rd place	
