= Camilla Lamina =

Filipino volleyball player

Personal information
- Full name: Camilla Victoria Lamina
- Nickname: Lams
- Nationality: Filipino
- Born: April 23, 2002 (age 24) San Juan, Metro Manila, Philippines
- Home town: Guimaras
- Education: National University
- Height: 5 ft 7 in (1.70 m)

Volleyball information
- Position: Setter
- Current team: Galeries Tower Highrisers

Career
- Years: Team
- 2026–present: Galeries Tower Highrisers

Camilla Victoria "Lams" Lamina (born April 23, 2002) is a Filipino professional volleyball player. She is currently playing for the Galeries Tower Highrisers in the Premier Volleyball League (PVL).

== Early life and education ==
Camilla Victoria Lamina was born on April 23, 2002, in San Juan, Metro Manila, Philippines. Hailing from Guimaras she studied at the Grace Baptist Academy in Buenavista in her elementary studies. After being scouted by National University (NU) coaches, Lamina attended the NU Nazareth School in Manila. She later studied at NU for college.

== Career ==
=== Collegiate ===
Lamina played for the Lady Bulldogs, the women's varsity team of National University of the University Athletic Association of the Philippines.

She made her first game appearance with NU Lady Bulldogs in UAAP Season 84 women's where they ended up winning the title after 65 years of championship drought.

This was followed by 2022 Shakey's Super League Collegiate Pre-Season Championship where they bagged another the championship title for their school.

In UAAP Season 85, they failed to win the back to back championship title after their loss in the Finals against La Salle.

In UAAP Season 86, Lamina was a part of the NU Lady Bulldogs line-up who won the UAAP Season 86 women's.

In her final season, Lamina and the Bulldogs finished as runners-up for Season 88 which ended in May 2026.

=== Club ===
Lamina is the top overall pick at the 2026 draft of the Premier Volleyball League. She was selected by the Galeries Tower Highrisers.

=== National team ===
Lamina was part of the squad which played at both the first and second legs of SEA V.League.

This was followed by Asian Women's Volleyball Championship where they ended up in 13th place.

== Awards ==
=== Individual ===
Year	League	Season/Conference	Award	Ref
2019	UAAP	81 (Junior's)	Best Setter	
2020	UAAP	82 (Junior's)	Best Setter	
2022	UAAP	84 (Women's)	Best Setter	
2022	SSL	Pre-Season	Best Setter	
2023	SSL	Pre-Season	Best Setter	
2024	SSL	Pre-Season	Best Setter	
2025	UAAP	87 (Women's)	Best Setter	

=== Highschool ===
Year	League	Season	Title	Ref
2015	UAAP	77	Champions	
2016	UAAP	78	Champions	
2017	UAAP	79	Champions	
2017	RVL girls' U18		Champions	
2018	UAAP	80	Champions	
2019	UAAP	81	Runner-up	
2019	NCR Palaro		Champions	
2019	Palarong Pambansa		Champions	
2020	UAAP	82	Champions	

=== Collegiate ===
Year	League	Season/Conference	Title	Ref
2022	UAAP	84	Champions	
2022	SSL	Pre-Season	Champions	
2023	UAAP	85	Runner-Up	
2023	SSL	Pre-Season	Champions	
2024	UAAP	86	Champions	
2024	UNIGAMES		Champions	
2024	SSL	Invitationals	Champions	
2024	SSL	Pre-Season	Champions	
2025	UAAP	87	Champions	
2026	UAAP	88	Runner-Up	
