= Alyssa Solomon =

Filipino volleyball player (born 2001)

Personal information
- Nationality: Filipino
- Born: December 14, 2001 (age 24) Calamba, Laguna, Philippine
- Home town: Santa Rosa, Laguna
- Education: National University
- Height: 1.87 m (6 ft 2 in)
- Weight: 78 kg (172 lb)
- Spike: 303 cm (119 in)
- Block: 289 cm (114 in)

Volleyball information
- Position: Opposite hitter
- Current team: Nakhon Ratchasima

Career
- Years: Team
- 2018: BaliPure-NU
- 2025–2026: Osaka Marvelous
- 2026–present: Nakhon Ratchasima 3M Flims

National team
- Years: Team
- 2017–: Philippines
Honours
Women's volleyball
Representing Philippines
Asian Nations Cup
Silver medal – second place	2025 Hanoi	Team
SEA V.League
Bronze medal – third place	2024 Vĩnh Phúc / Nakhon Ratchasima	Team
Bronze medal – third place	2025 Nakhon Ratchasima / Ninh Bình	Team
ASEAN School Games
Bronze medal – third place	2017 Singapore	Team
Silver medal – second place	2019 Semarang	Team

Alyssa Jae Solomon (born December 14, 2001) is a Filipino volleyball player who is an opposite spiker for Nakhon Ratchasima of the Women's Volleyball Thailand League and the Philippines national team. She played for the NU Lady Bulldogs in college.

== Early life and education ==
Alyssa Jae Solomon was born on December 14, 2001 in Calamba, Laguna in the Philippines. She studied high school at University of Perpetual Help System DALTA – Biñan then, transferred to Nazareth School of National University when she was in Grade 10 and played in the UAAP girls ’volleyball tournaments where she was awarded Best Opposite Hitter.

She graduated with a degree in marketing management at the National University in 2025.

== Career ==
=== Palarong Pambansa ===
When she was in University of Perpetual Help System DALTA - Biñan, she was selected as a member of the Region IV-A (CALABARZON) team for the Palarong Pambansa, a national sports competition for elementary and secondary students. She was awarded Most Valuable Player in 2017.

When she was in Nazareth School of National University, she was selected as a member of the National Capital Region (NCR) for the 2019 Palarong Pambansa where they won and she was awarded her second Most Valuable Player award in Palarong Pambansa.

=== High school ===
Solomon played for the Nazareth School of National University. NU Nazareth also represented the Philippines in the ASEAN School Games in 2017, where they finished bronze. They also represented the country in the ASEAN School Games in 2019, where they finished silver.

=== College ===
Solomon continued to play within the NU athletic program, playing for the senior team of the National University. She is part of the NU Lady Bulldogs which plays in the University Athletic Association of the Philippines (UAAP).

Solomon was the finals MVP of UAAP Season 86. In March 2025 while the Season 87 tournament is underway she applied for the 2025 Korean V-League (KOVO) Asian Quota Draft which was conducted online. However she withdrew upon learning the move may make her lose her amateur status. While cleared by the UAAP to compete, Solomon is facing a three-year ban by KOVO for the withdrawal which is being appealed by the Philippine National Volleyball Federation.

=== Club ===
Solomon has already played at a club-level; with the BaliPure Purest Water Defenders at the Premier Volleyball League (PVL) in 2018.

In September 2025, Solomon joined the Japanese SV.League as a player for Osaka Marvelous. She left the team after the conclusion of the 2025–26 season.

Solomon was pegged to return to the PVL, declaring her intention to take part in the 2026 PVL draft. However she withdrew from the draft, reportedly receiving several offers from European clubs.

In October 2026, Solomon joined Nakhon Ratchasima of the Women's Volleyball Thailand League for the 2026–27 season.

== Clubs ==
- (Philippines) BaliPure Purest Water Defenders (2018)
- (Japan) Osaka Marvelous (2025–2026)
- (Thailand) Nakhon Ratchasima (2026–present)

== Awards ==
=== Individual ===
==== MVP ====
Year	League	Award Type
2017	Palarong Pambansa	—N/a
2019	Palarong Pambansa	—N/a
2022	SSL (Pre-season)	Season
2023	SSL (Pre-season)	Season
2024	UAAP S86	Season
2024	SSL (Pre-season)	Season

==== Positional ====
Year	League	Positional Award
2017	Rebisco Girls' VL	1st Best OH
2020	UAAP S82 (girls')	Best OPP
2022	UAAP S84 (women's)	Best OPP
2022	SSL (Pre-season)	Best OPP
2023	SEA VLeague (2nd)	Best OPP
2023	SSL (Pre-season)	Best OPP
2024	UAAP S86	Best OPP
2024	SEA VLeague (2nd)	Best OPP
2024	SSL (Pre-season)	Best OPP

=== High school ===
Year	League	Season	Title	Ref
2017	UAAP	79	Champions	
2017	Palarong Pambansa		Champions	
2017	RVL girls' U18		Champions	
2018	UAAP	80	Champions	
2019	UAAP	81	Runner-up	
2019	Palarong Pambansa		Champions	
2020	UAAP	82	Champions	

=== Collegiate ===
Year	League	Season/Conference	Title	Ref
2022	UAAP	84	Champions	
2022	SSL	Pre-Season	Champions	
2023	UAAP	85	Runner-Up	
2023	SSL	Pre-Season	Champions	
2024	UAAP	86	Champions	
2024	UNIGAMES		Champions	
2024	SSL	Invitationals	Champions	
2024	SSL	Pre-Season	Champions	

=== International ===
==== Philippine women's national team ====
Year	League		Title	Ref
2017	ASEAN School Games		3rd place	
2019	ASEAN School Games		Runner-up	
2024	SEA V.League	1st Leg	3rd place	
2024	SEA V.League	2nd Leg	3rd place	
2025	AVC Women's Nation Cup		Runner-up	
2025	SEA V.League	1st Leg	3rd place	
2025	SEA V.League	2nd Leg	3rd place	
