= Rica Diolan =

Filipino volleyball player

Rica B. Diolan
Personal information
- Full name: Rica Braza Diolan
- Born: August 15, 1999 (age 27)
- Home town: Davao City, Philippines
- Education: National University
- Height: 5 ft 6 in (1.68 m)
- Weight: 55 kg (121 lb)
- Spike: 254 cm (100 in)
- Block: 253 cm (100 in)

Volleyball information
- Position: Setter
- Current club: Marinerang Pilipina Lady Skippers
- Number: 10

Career
- Years: Team
- 2018: BaliPure
- 2020: Marinerang Pilipina

National team
- Years: Team
- 2014: Philippines (U17)
- 2016: Philippines (U19)

Rica Diolan is a Filipino volleyball player. She played for the NU Lady Bulldogs Volleyball Team in the UAAP in UAAP Season 78.

== Career ==
Diolan played for the U-17 team of the Philippines women's national volleyball team which competed in the 2014 Asian Youth Girls Volleyball Championship. They finished 7th among 13 teams in the 2014 Asian Youth Girls Volleyball Championship. They defeated Australia and India while losing to China in straight sets in the Group C stage. In the Qualifying Round, the team lost to Thailand while winning against New Zealand in 4 sets. In the Quarterfinals, they lost to South Korea. In the 5th–8th place playoffs, they lost to Kazakhstan in 5 sets. In the 7th place game, they won against New Zealand again.

Rica Diolan joined the NU Lady Bulldogs to play in the UAAP Season 78 where they finished at 3rd place. She was also the setter of the team in the Shakey's V-League 12th Season Collegiate Conference where they claim the championship.

Diolan is the team captain of the Under-19 Philippines women's national volleyball team in 2016 which competed in the 2016 Asian Women's U19 Volleyball Championship. The team finished at 10th place defeating Australia, Hong Kong, Macau, and New Zealand. She was also the setter of the team which competed in the 2016 South East Asian Junior Women's Volleyball Championships where the team finished at the fourth place.

She is set to play for the BaliPure Purest Water Defenders in the 2018 PVL season.

== Awards ==
=== Individual ===
- 2015 Palarong Pambansa "Best Setter"
- UAAP Season 77 Girls "Best Setter"

=== High school ===
- 2015 UAAP Season 77 Girls' Volleyball - Champions, with Nazareth School of National University Lady Bullpups

=== Collegiate ===
- 2015 Shakey's V-League 12th Season Collegiate Conference - Champions, with National University Lady Bulldogs
- 2016 UAAP Season 77 Women's Volleyball - Bronze medal, with National University Lady Bulldogs
