= 2023 Shakey's Super League Pre-season Championship =

2023 collegiate volleyball competition

Tournament details
- Dates: September 16 – November 11, 2023
- Teams: 16
- Venue: 2

Final positions
- Champions: NU Lady Bulldogs (2nd title)
- Runners-up: UST Golden Tigresses
- Third place: FEU Lady Tamaraws
- Fourth place: Adamson Lady Falcons

Tournament awards
- MVP: Alyssa Jae Solomon
- Best Setter: Camilla Victoria Lamina
- Best OH: Mhicaela Belen; Angge Poyos
- Best MB: Erin May Pangilinan; Lorene Grace Toring
- Best OPP: Alyssa Jae Solomon
- Best Libero: Ma. Bernadett Pepito

Tournament statistics
- Matches played: 51

The 2023 Shakey's Super League Pre-season Championship was the second edition of the collegiate pre-season competition organized by the Shakey's Super League and the third and final SSL tournament of 2023. The tournament began on September 16 at the Filoil EcoOil Centre with ten teams from NCAA and six teams from UAAP.

The UP Fighting Maroons and De La Salle Lady Spikers are both skipping this tournament due to rebuilding and recovery of players from injuries, respectively.

== Participating teams ==
2023 Shakey's Super League Collegiate Pre-Season Tournament
Team	School	Collegiate league
Adamson Lady Falcons	Adamson University	UAAP
Arellano Lady Chiefs	Arellano University	NCAA
Ateneo Blue Eagles	Ateneo de Manila University	UAAP
Benilde Lady Blazers	De La Salle–College of Saint Benilde	NCAA
EAC Lady Generals	Emilio Aguinaldo College	NCAA
FEU Lady Tamaraws	Far Eastern University	UAAP
JRU Lady Bombers	José Rizal University	NCAA
Letran Lady Knights	Colegio de San Juan de Letran	NCAA
Lyceum Lady Pirates	Lyceum of the Philippines University	NCAA
Mapúa Lady Cardinals	Mapúa University	NCAA
NU Lady Bulldogs	National University	UAAP
Perpetual Lady Altas	University of Perpetual Help System DALTA	NCAA
San Beda Lady Red Spikers	San Beda University	NCAA
San Sebastian Lady Stags	San Sebastian College – Recoletos	NCAA
UE Lady Warriors	University of the East	UAAP
UST Golden Tigresses	University of Santo Tomas	UAAP

== Pool composition ==
The top eight teams from 2022 Collegiate Pre-Season Championship are pre-assigned to the pools using the serpentine system. Teams outside the top eight shall have a draw of lots to determine their pool.

First round

Pool A	Pool B	Pool C	Pool D
NU Lady Bulldogs (1)	Adamson Lady Falcons (3)	UST Growling Tigresses (4)	Ateneo Blue Eagles (5)
UE Lady Warriors (9)	Lyceum Lady Pirates (9)	Perpetual Lady Altas (8)	FEU Lady Tamaraws (7)
San Sebastian Lady Stags	Arellano Lady Chiefs	Benilde Lady Blazers	Mapúa Lady Cardinals
JRU Lady Bombers	San Beda Red Spikers	Letran Lady Knights	EAC Lady Generals

== Venues ==
Preliminaries	Preliminaries, Semifinals, Finals
San Juan City	City of Manila
Filoil EcoOil Centre	Rizal Memorial Coliseum
Capacity: 6,000	Capacity: 6,100

== Format ==
This tournament will implement the "All to Play" system in its games, where teams will field all the players on the roster who will be given a chance to play in a match. It is a system where a team will be fielding different players (except Libero) to play in the first two sets. The substitution will take effect when the set score reaches 16. Starting from the 3rd set onwards, the standard play will return. This is the competition format that will be conducted for the entirety of the conference.

First round

1. Single-round robin format; 4 pools; Teams are ranked using the FIVB Ranking System.
2. The top two teams per pool will advance to the second round.

Second round

1. Single-round robin format; 2 pools; Teams are ranked using the FIVB Ranking System.
2. The W-L record in the first round will be carried over in the second round.
3. After another pool play, the eight teams will battle in the crossover quarterfinals.

Quarterfinals (twice-to-beat)

1. QF1: E1 vs. F4 (E1 twice-to-beat)
2. QF3: F2 vs. E3 (F2 twice-to-beat)
3. QF2: F1 vs. E4 (F1 twice-to-beat)
4. QF4: E2 vs. F3 (E2 twice-to-beat)

Semifinals (knockout stage)

1. SF1: QF #1 vs. QF #3
2. SF2: QF #2 vs. QF #4

Finals (Best-of-three series)

1. Bronze medal: SF1 Loser vs SF2 Loser
2. Gold medal: SF1 Winner vs SF2 Winner

== Pool standing procedure ==
1. Number of matches won
2. Match points
3. Sets ratio
4. Points ratio
5. If the tie continues as per the point ratio between two teams, the priority will be given to the team which won the last match between them. When the tie in points ratio is between three or more teams, a new classification of these teams in the terms of points 1, 2 and 3 will be made taking into consideration only the matches in which they were opposed to each other.

Match won 3–0 or 3–1: 3 match points for the winner, 0 match points for the loser

Match won 3–2: 2 match points for the winner, 1 match point for the loser.

== First round ==
- All times are Philippine Standard Time (UTC+8:00).
- The top two teams per pool advance to the second round.

=== Pool A ===
Pos	Team	Pld	W	L	Pts	SW	SL	SR	SPW	SPL	SPR	Qualification
1	NU Lady Bulldogs	3	3	0	9	9	0	MAX	225	129	1.744	Second round
2	UE Lady Warriors	3	2	1	6	6	3	2.000	199	187	1.064	Second round
3	San Sebastian Lady Stags	3	1	2	3	3	7	0.429	200	227	0.881	
4	JRU Lady Bombers	3	0	3	0	1	9	0.111	165	250	0.660	

Date	Time	Venue		Score		Set 1	Set 2	Set 3	Set 4	Set 5	Total	Report
Sep 17	11:00	FEC	UE Lady Warriors	3–0	JRU Lady Bombers	25–14	25–21	25–19			75–54	
Sep 18	14:00	FEC	JRU Lady Bombers	1–3	San Sebastian Lady Stags	20–25	25–21	20–25	12–25		77–96	
Sep 23	17:00	FEC	UE Lady Warriors	0–3	NU Lady Bulldogs	15–25	19–25	15–25			49–75	
Sep 24	17:00	FEC	NU Lady Bulldogs	3–0	San Sebastian Lady Stags	25–18	25–15	25–13			75–46	
Sep 30	11:00	RMC	San Sebastian Lady Stags	0–3	UE Lady Warriors	18–25	20–25	20–25			58–75	
Oct 1	11:00	RMC	NU Lady Bulldogs	3–0	JRU Lady Bombers	25–11	25–12	25–11			75–34	

=== Pool B ===
Pos	Team	Pld	W	L	Pts	SW	SL	SR	SPW	SPL	SPR	Qualification
1	Adamson Lady Falcons	3	3	0	9	9	0	MAX	225	144	1.563	Second round
2	Arellano Lady Chiefs	3	2	1	6	6	4	1.500	225	211	1.066	Second round
3	Lyceum Lady Pirates	3	1	2	3	4	7	0.571	225	240	0.938	
4	San Beda Lady Red Spikers	3	0	3	0	1	9	0.111	165	245	0.673	

Date	Time	Venue		Score		Set 1	Set 2	Set 3	Set 4	Set 5	Total	Report
Sep 16	17:00	FEC	San Beda Lady Red Spikers	0–3	Arellano Lady Chiefs	15–25	21–25	15–25			51–75	
Sep 17	14:00	FEC	Lyceum Lady Pirates	3–1	San Beda Lady Red Spikers	25–6	19–25	26–24	25–18		95–73	
Sep 17	17:00	FEC	Arellano Lady Chiefs	0–3	Adamson Lady Falcons	19–25	17–25	22–25			58–75	
Sep 24	11:00	FEC	Lyceum Lady Pirates	1–3	Arellano Lady Chiefs	22–25	25–17	21–25	17–25		85–92	
Sep 25	09:00	FEC	Adamson Lady Falcons	3–0	Lyceum Lady Pirates	25–16	25–16	25–13			75–45	
Oct 1	14:00	RMC	Adamson Lady Falcons	3–0	San Beda Lady Red Spikers	25–14	25–10	25–17			75–41	

=== Pool C ===
Pos	Team	Pld	W	L	Pts	SW	SL	SR	SPW	SPL	SPR	Qualification
1	UST Golden Tigresses	3	3	0	9	9	2	4.500	268	203	1.320	Second round
2	Benilde Lady Blazers	3	2	1	5	7	6	1.167	277	272	1.018	Second round
3	Perpetual Lady Altas	3	1	2	4	6	6	1.000	244	249	0.980	
4	Letran Lady Knights	3	0	3	0	1	9	0.111	180	245	0.735	

Date	Time	Venue		Score		Set 1	Set 2	Set 3	Set 4	Set 5	Total	Report
Sep 16	15:00	FEC	Perpetual Lady Altas	1–3	UST Golden Tigresses	12–25	25–21	15–25	21–25		73–96	
Sep 18	11:00	FEC	Letran Lady Knights	0–3	UST Golden Tigresses	21–25	23–25	14–25			58–75	
Sep 23	11:00	FEC	Benilde Lady Blazers	3–1	Letran Lady Knights	20–25	25–14	25–18	25–22		95–79	
Sep 25	11:00	FEC	UST Golden Tigresses	3–1	Benilde Lady Blazers	25–13	22–25	25–12	25–22		97–72	
Sep 25	17:00	FEC	Letran Lady Knights	0–3	Perpetual Lady Altas	9–25	17–25	17–25			43–75	
Sep 30	17:00	RMC	Perpetual Lady Altas	2–3	Benilde Lady Blazers	26–24	21–25	25–21	13–25	11–15	96–110	

=== Pool D ===
Pos	Team	Pld	W	L	Pts	SW	SL	SR	SPW	SPL	SPR	Qualification
1	FEU Lady Tamaraws	3	3	0	8	9	2	4.500	260	190	1.368	Second round
2	Ateneo Blue Eagles	3	2	1	7	8	3	2.667	262	235	1.115	Second round
3	Mapúa Lady Cardinals	3	1	2	3	3	6	0.500	210	217	0.968	
4	EAC Lady Generals	3	0	3	0	0	9	0.000	139	229	0.607	

Date	Time	Venue		Score		Set 1	Set 2	Set 3	Set 4	Set 5	Total	Report
Sep 18	17:00	FEC	FEU Lady Tamaraws	3–0	Mapúa Lady Cardinals	25–23	25–14	25–18			75–55	
Sep 23	14:00	FEC	EAC Lady Generals	0–3	FEU Lady Tamaraws	6–25	15–25	12–25			33–75	
Sep 24	14:00	FEC	Mapúa Lady Cardinals	0–3	Ateneo Blue Eagles	23–25	20–25	33–35			76–85	
Sep 25	14:00	FEC	Mapúa Lady Cardinals	3–0	EAC Lady Generals	25–19	29–27	25–11			79–57	
Sep 30	14:00	RMC	Ateneo Blue Eagles	2–3	FEU Lady Tamaraws	25–22	25–23	20–25	22–25	10–15	102–110	
Oct 1	17:00	RMC	EAC Lady Generals	0–3	Ateneo Blue Eagles	13–25	20–25	16–25			49–75	

== Second round ==
- All times are Philippine Standard Time (UTC+8:00).

=== Pool E ===
Pos	Team	Pld	W	L	Pts	SW	SL	SR	SPW	SPL	SPR	Qualification
1	NU Lady Bulldogs	6	6	0	18	18	0	MAX	450	289	1.557	Quarterfinals with twice-to-beat advantage
2	UST Golden Tigresses	6	5	1	15	15	5	3.000	479	395	1.213	Quarterfinals with twice-to-beat advantage
3	Arellano Lady Chiefs	6	3	3	9	9	10	0.900	415	427	0.972	Quarterfinals
4	Ateneo Blue Eagles	6	2	4	7	8	12	0.667	429	460	0.933	Quarterfinals

Date	Time		Score		Set 1	Set 2	Set 3	Set 4	Set 5	Total	Report
Oct 14	14:00	Arellano Lady Chiefs	3–0	Ateneo Blue Eagles	25–21	25–18	25–21			75–60	
Oct 14	17:00	NU Lady Bulldogs	3–0	UST Golden Tigresses	25–19	25–20	25–16			75–55	
Oct 15	14:00	UST Golden Tigresses	3–0	Arellano Lady Chiefs	25–16	31–29	25–18			81–63	
Oct 15	17:00	Ateneo Blue Eagles	0–3	NU Lady Bulldogs	20–25	18–25	15–25			53–75	
Oct 21	11:00	NU Lady Bulldogs	3–0	Arellano Lady Chiefs	25–17	25–22	25–13			75–52	
Oct 22	17:00	Ateneo Blue Eagles	0–3	UST Growling Tigresses	15–25	21–25	18–25			54–75	

=== Pool F ===
Pos	Team	Pld	W	L	Pts	SW	SL	SR	SPW	SPL	SPR	Qualification
1	FEU Lady Tamaraws	6	5	1	15	17	5	3.400	464	431	1.077	Quarterfinals with twice-to-beat advantage
2	Adamson Lady Falcons	6	5	1	14	15	6	2.500	473	391	1.210	Quarterfinals with twice-to-beat advantage
3	Benilde Lady Blazers	6	4	2	11	15	11	1.364	560	509	1.100	Quarterfinals
4	UE Lady Warriors	6	2	4	6	7	12	0.583	385	433	0.889	Quarterfinals

Date	Time		Score		Set 1	Set 2	Set 3	Set 4	Set 5	Total	Report
Oct 14	11:00	Adamson Lady Falcons	0–3	FEU Lady Tamaraws	20–25	22–25	20–25			62–75	
Oct 15	11:00	Benilde Lady Blazers	3–0	UE Lady Warriors	25–18	25–21	25–4			75–43	
Oct 21	14:00	Benilde Lady Blazers	3–2	FEU Lady Tamaraws	25–19	21–25	25–15	24–26	19–17	114–102	
Oct 21	17:00	UE Lady Warriors	1–3	Adamson Lady Falcons	14–25	25–19	23–25	16–25		78–94	
Oct 22	11:00	FEU Lady Tamaraws	3–0	UE Lady Warriors	25–23	25–17	27–25			77–65	
Oct 22	14:00	Adamson Lady Falcons	3–2	Benilde Lady Blazers	25–18	10–25	17–25	25–18	15–8	92–94	

== Final round ==
- All times are Philippine Standard Time (UTC+8:00).

5th place match (Single-elimination)
November 10
UE Lady Warriors	2
Benilde Lady Blazers	3
7th place match
November 10
Arellano Lady Chiefs	2
Ateneo Blue Eagles	3

5th–8th semifinals (Single-elimination)
November 4
UE Lady Warriors	3
Arellano Lady Chiefs	0
November 5
Ateneo Blue Eagles	1
Benilde Lady Blazers	3

Quarterfinals (#1 and #2 with twice-to-beat advantage)
October 29
E1	NU Lady Bulldogs	3
F4	UE Lady Warriors	0
October 29
F2	Adamson Lady Falcons	3
E3	Arellano Lady Chiefs	0
October 28
F1	FEU Lady Tamaraws	3
E4	Ateneo Blue Eagles	0
October 28
E2	UST Golden Tigresses	2	3
F3	Benilde Lady Blazers	3	1

Semifinals (Single-elimination)
November 5
NU Lady Bulldogs	3
Adamson Lady Falcons	0
November 5
FEU Lady Tamaraws	1
UST Golden Tigresses	3

Championship (Best-of-three series)
November 10–11
NU Lady Bulldogs	3	3
UST Golden Tigresses	1	1
3rd place match
November 10–11
Adamson Lady Falcons	2	2
FEU Lady Tamaraws	3	3

=== Quarterfinals ===
Date	Time		Score		Set 1	Set 2	Set 3	Set 4	Set 5	Total	Report
Oct 28	14:00	UST Golden Tigresses	2–3	Benilde Lady Blazers	22–25	25–23	25–18	23–25	11–15	106–106	
Oct 28	17:00	FEU Lady Tamaraws	3–0	Ateneo Blue Eagles	25–19	25–18	25–18			75–55	
Oct 29	14:00	UE Lady Warriors	0–3	NU Lady Bulldogs	19–25	21–25	23–25			63–75	
Oct 29	17:00	Arellano Lady Chiefs	0–3	Adamson Lady Falcons	21–25	18–25	15–25			54–75	
Nov 4	11:00	Benilde Lady Blazers	1–3	UST Golden Tigresses	15–25	16–25	25–19	30–32		86–101	

=== 5th–8th semifinals ===
Date	Time		Score		Set 1	Set 2	Set 3	Set 4	Set 5	Total	Report
Nov 4	14:00	UE Lady Warriors	3–0	Arellano Lady Chiefs	25–21	25–18	25–19			75–58	
Nov 5	11:00	Ateneo Blue Eagles	1–3	Benilde Lady Blazers	20–25	25–19	11–25	11–25		67–94	

=== Semifinals ===
Date	Time		Score		Set 1	Set 2	Set 3	Set 4	Set 5	Total	Report
Nov 5	14:00	NU Lady Bulldogs	3–0	Adamson Lady Falcons	25–13	26–24	25–20			76–57	
Nov 5	17:00	FEU Lady Tamaraws	1–3	UST Golden Tigresses	21–25	20–25	25–19	20–25		86–94	

=== 7th place match ===
Date	Time		Score		Set 1	Set 2	Set 3	Set 4	Set 5	Total	Report
Nov 10	09:00	Arellano Lady Chiefs	2–3	Ateneo Blue Eagles	16–25	25–20	22–25	25–22	11–15	99–107	

=== 5th place match ===
Date	Time		Score		Set 1	Set 2	Set 3	Set 4	Set 5	Total	Report
Nov 10	11:00	UE Lady Warriors	2–3	Benilde Lady Blazers	12–25	25–20	25–22	27–29	4–15	93–111	

=== 3rd place match ===
Date	Time		Score		Set 1	Set 2	Set 3	Set 4	Set 5	Total	Report
Nov 10	14:00	Adamson Lady Falcons	2–3	FEU Lady Tamaraws	20–25	19–25	25–12	25–14	12–15	101–91	
Nov 11	14:00	FEU Lady Tamaraws	3–2	Adamson Lady Falcons	25–18	16–25	25–15	21–25	15–7	102–90	

=== Championship match ===
Date	Time		Score		Set 1	Set 2	Set 3	Set 4	Set 5	Total	Report
Nov 10	17:00	NU Lady Bulldogs	3–1	UST Golden Tigresses	21–25	25–16	25–19	25–17		96–77	
Nov 11	17:00	UST Golden Tigresses	1–3	NU Lady Bulldogs	17–25	25–15	20–25	20–25		82–90	

== Final standing ==
Rank	Team
1st place, gold medalist(s)	NU Lady Bulldogs
2nd place, silver medalist(s)	UST Golden Tigresses
3rd place, bronze medalist(s)	FEU Lady Tamaraws
4	Adamson Lady Falcons
5	Benilde Lady Blazers
6	UE Lady Warriors
7	Ateneo Blue Eagles
8	Arellano Lady Chiefs
9	Perpetual Lady Altas
10	Lyceum Lady Pirates
11	Mapúa Lady Cardinals
12	San Sebastian Lady Stags
13	Letran Lady Knights
14	San Beda Lady Red Spikers
15	JRU Lady Bombers
16	EAC Lady Generals

2023 SSL Collegiate Pre-Season champions

NU Lady Bulldogs
2nd title

Team Roster
Pearl Ann Denura, Mhicaela Belen, Evangeline Alinsug, Sheena Angela Toring, Alexa Nicole Mata, Alyssa Jae Solomon, Camilla Victoria Lamina, Erin May Pangilinan (c), Shaira May Jardio, Minierva Maaya, Myrtle Escanlar, Nathaszha Kaye Bombita, Abegail Pono, Aishat Bello, Arah Ella Panique
Head coach
Norman Miguel

== Awards and medalists ==
=== Individual awards ===
Award	Player	Team	Ref.
Most Valuable Player	Alyssa Jae Solomon	NU Lady Bulldogs	
1st Best Outside Spiker	Mhicaela Belen	NU Lady Bulldogs	
2nd Best Outside Spiker	Angeline Poyos	UST Golden Tigresses	
1st Best Middle Blocker	Erin May Pangilinan	NU Lady Bulldogs	
2nd Best Middle Blocker	Lorene Grace Toring	Adamson Lady Falcons	
Best Opposite Spiker	Alyssa Jae Solomon	NU Lady Bulldogs	
Best Setter	Camilla Victoria Lamina	NU Lady Bulldogs	
Best Libero	Ma. Bernadett Pepito	UST Golden Tigresses	

=== Medalists ===
Gold	Silver	Bronze
NU Lady Bulldogs PANGILINAN, Erin May (c); JARDIO, Shaira Mae; BOMBITA, Nathaszha Kaye; PONO, Abegail; BELEN, Mhicaela; ALINSUG, Evangeline; TORING, Sheena Angela; BELLO, Aishat; MATA, Alexa Nicole; SOLOMON, Alyssa Jae; LAMINA, Camilla Victoria; MAAYA, Minierva; PANIQUE, Arah Ella; ESCANLAR, Myrtle; DENURA, Pearl Ann Head Coach: Norman Miguel	UST Golden Tigresses PEPITO, Ma. Bernadett (c); POYOS, Angeline; PLAZA, Bianca Mikaela Julia; BACALSO, Angeli; ROCAFORT, Alyanna; CAASI, Karylle Ann; GULA, Xyza Rufel; ABBU, Athena Sopia; PERDIDO, Jonna Chris; CARBALLO, Ma. Cassandra Rae; JURADO, Regina Grace; BANAGUA, Mart Margaret; CORONADO, Mary Joe; CORDORA, Kyla Elvi; HILONGO, Maribeth; SAPIA, Rose; JACKSON, Mary Angela; TAN, Cristabelle Gracille; LIMPOT, Zoe Head Coach: Emilio Reyes Jr.	FEU Lady Tamaraws MEDINA, Nikka Ann (c); UBALDO, Christine; GALLO, Gillianne; TAGAOD, Chenie; BEDONIA, Kiesha Dazzie; DEVOSORA, Alyzza Gaile; ELLARINA, Jazlyn Anne; BAKANKE, Faida; ASIS, Anne Roselle; PAPA, Florize Anne; PANANGIN, Mitzi; TRUZ, Karyme Isabella; ENCARNACION, Margarett Louise; MONARES, Julianne; JUANGCO, Alexandra Maxine; PETALLO, Gerzel Mary; ALBERTO, Marilla Issabel; MORALES, Zyra Danica Head Coach: Manolo Refugia
