= NU Lady Bulldogs volleyball =

Team of National University, Philippines

NU Lady Bulldogs
- University: National University
- Nickname: Lady Bulldogs
- Location: Manila, Philippines
- Head coach: Regine Diego
- Captain: Evangeline Alinsug

Main league
- League: UAAP
- Season 87 (2025): Champions

Championships
- UAAP: 5; SSL: 5; Shakey's V-League: 3; PVL: 1

The NU Lady Bulldogs volleyball is the women's collegiate varsity volleyball team of the National University. The team competes in the University Athletic Association of the Philippines (UAAP).

== History ==
NU Lady Bulldogs Spikers won their first in season 16 (1953–54). As of UAAP Season 86, NU Lady Bulldogs have won 5 UAAP championships (Season 16 (1953–54), Season 19 (1956–57), Season 84 (2021–22), Season 86 (2023–24) and Season 87 (2024-2025).

In Season 86, the NU Men’s and Women’s volleyball teams dominated and emerged as champions after both defeating the University of Santo Tomas Men’s and Women’s teams respectively.

The team would play as a club under the name NU–Monolith Sky Risers at the 2024 Asian Women's Club Volleyball Championship. They finished sixth.

== Current roster ==
=== NU Lady Bulldogs volleyball team ===
UAAP Season 88 Roster
No.	Name	Position	Height	Playing Year
1	Kaye Bombita	Opposite Hitter	1.71 m (5 ft 7 in)	3rd
3	Abegail Pono	Setter	1.69 m (5 ft 7 in)	3rd
5	Shaira Jardio	Libero	5 ft 2 in (1.57 m)	4th
6	Evangeline Alinsug (c)	Outside Hitter	5 ft 7 in (1.70 m)	4th
7	Jenelyn Jacob	Middle Blocker		Rookie
8	Josline Salazar	Middle Blocker	1.77 m (5 ft 10 in)	Rookie
10	Alexa Mata	Middle Blocker	1.80 m (5 ft 11 in)	4th
12	Samantha Cantada	Outside Hitter	1.70 m (5 ft 7 in)	Rookie
13	Camilla Lamina	Setter	1.70 m (5 ft 7 in)	5th
14	Harlyn Serneche	Opposite Hitter	1.74 m (5 ft 9 in)	Rookie
15	Denesse Daylisan	Outside Hitter	1.69 m (5 ft 7 in)	Rookie
17	Minerva Maaya	Middle Blocker	1.78 m (5 ft 10 in)	4th
18	Arah Panique	Outside Hitter	5 ft 9 in (1.75 m)	3rd
19	Celine Marsh	Outside Hitter	1.80 m (5 ft 11 in)	2nd
20	IC Cepada	Libero	1.59 m (5 ft 3 in)	2nd
21	Myrtle Escanlar	Outside Hitter	1.66 m (5 ft 5 in)	4th

=== Team staff ===
Name	Position
Regine Diego	Head coach

== Previous rosters ==
=== UAAP champions ===
UAAP Season 87 roster

NU Lady Bulldogs
No.	Player	Position
3	Abegail Pono	S
4	Bella Belen (c)	OH
5	Shaira Jardio	L
6	Vangie Alinsug	OH
8	Sheena Toring	MB
9	Aishat Bello	MB
10	Alexa Mata	MB
12	Alyssa Solomon	OP
13	Camilla Lamina	S
14	Erin Pangilinan	MB
17	Minerva Maaya	MB
18	Arah Panique	OH
19	Celine Marsh	OH
20	IC Cepada	L
	Sherwin Meneses	HC

UAAP Season 86 roster

NU Lady Bulldogs
No.	Player	Position
1	Kaye Bombita	OP
2	Pearl Denura	L
3	Abegail Pono	S
4	Bella Belen	OH
5	Shaira Jardio	L
6	Vangie Alinsug	OH
8	Sheena Toring	MB
9	Aishat Bello	MB
10	Alexa Mata	MB
12	Alyssa Solomon	OP
13	Camilla Lamina	S
14	Erin Pangilinan (c)	MB
17	Minerva Maaya	MB
21	Myrtle Escanlar	OH
	Norman Miguel	HC

UAAP Season 84 roster

NU Lady Bulldogs
No.	Player	Position
1	Pearl Denura	L
3	Chiennie Arroyo	OH
4	Bella Belen	OH
7	Cess Robles (c)	OH
8	Sheena Toring	MB
9	Jen Nierva	L
10	Alexa Mata	MB
12	Alyssa Solomon	OP
13	Camilla Lamina	S
14	Erin Pangilinan	OP
15	France Ronquillo	OH
16	Ivy Lacsina	MB
17	Kamille Cal	S
18	Joyme Cagande	S
	Ray Karl Dimaculangan	HC

=== SVL/PVL champions ===
2017 PVL Collegiate roster

NU Lady Bulldogs
No.	Player	Position
3	Jaja Santiago	MB
4	Jasmine Nabor	S
5	Risa Sato	MB
6	Roma Joy Doromal	OH
7	Larnie Aberin	S
8	Joni Chavez	L
9	Aiko Urdas	OPP
11	Roselyn Doria	MB
13	Gayle Rose Valdez	L
14	Jorelle Singh (c)	OH
15	Audry Paran	OPP
	Roger Gorayeb	HC

13th Shakey's Collegiate roster

NU Lady Bulldogs
No.	Player	Position
3	Jaja Santiago	MB
4	Jasmine Nabor	S
5	Risa Sato	MB
6	Roma Joy Doromal	OH
7	Larnie Aberin	S
8	Joni Chavez	L
9	Aiko Urdas	OPP
11	Roselyn Doria	MB
13	Gayle Rose Valdez	L
14	Jorelle Singh (c)	OH
15	Audry Paran	OPP
	Roger Gorayeb	HC

12th Shakey's Collegiate roster

NU Lady Bulldogs
No.	Player	Position
1	Rica Diolan	S
2	Ivy Perez	S
3	Jaja Santiago	MB
4	Rubie De Leon (G)	S
5	Bia General	L
6	Roma Joy Doromal	OPP
7	Marites Pablo	OH
9	Aiko Urdas	OPP
11	Roselyn Doria	MB
13	Gayle Rose Valdez	
14	Jorelle Singh (c)	OH
15	Audry Paran	OPP
16	Dindin Santiago-Manabat (G)	MB
17	Myla Pablo	OH
18	Jasmine Nabor	OH
	Roger Gorayeb	HC

10th Shakey's Collegiate roster

NU Lady Bulldogs
No.	Player	Position
1	Desiree Dadang	OH
2	Ivy Perez	S
3	Jaja Santiago (G)	MB
4	Carmina Aganon	OH
5	Bia General	L
6	Precious Salibad	S
7	Rizza Mandapat	OH
8	Maricar Nepomuceno	OPP
9	Aiko Urdas	OPP
10	Rubie De Leon (G)	S
11	Myla Pablo	OH
12	Jennylyn Reyes	L
14	Andrea Marzan	MB
16	Dindin Santiago-Manabat (c)	MB
	Edjet Mabbayad	HC

=== SSL champions ===
2025 Pre-Season roster

NU Lady Bulldogs
No.	Player	Position
1	Nathasza Bombita	OPP
2	Chaitlin Mauricio	S
3	Abegail Pono	S
5	Shaira Jardio	L
6	Vangie Alinsug (c)	OH
7	Jenelyn Jacob	MB
8	Josline Salazar	MB
9	Aishat Bello	OPP
10	Alexa Mata	MB
11	Lyzel Dela Peña	MB
12	Sam Cantada	OH
13	Camilla Lamina	S
14	Harlyn Serneche	OPP
15	Denesse Daylisan	OH
16	Rashel Bajamonde	MB
17	Minerva Maaya	MB
18	Arah Panique	OPP
19	Celine Marsh	OH
20	IC Cepada	L
21	Myrtle Escanlar	OH
	Regine Diego	HC

2025 Invitationals roster

NU Lady Bulldogs
No.	Player	Position
1	Nathasza Bombita	OPP
2	Chaitlin Mauricio	S
3	Abegail Pono	S
5	Shaira Jardio	L
6	Vangie Alinsug (c)	OH
7	Jenelyn Jacob	MB
8	Josline Salazar	MB
9	Aishat Bello	OPP
10	Alexa Mata	MB
11	Lyzel Dela Peña	MB
12	Sam Cantada	OH
13	Camilla Lamina	S
14	Harlyn Serneche	OPP
15	Denesse Daylisan	OH
16	Rashel Bajamonde	MB
17	Minerva Maaya	MB
18	Arah Panique	OPP
19	Celine Marsh	OH
20	IC Cepada	L
21	Myrtle Escanlar	OH
	Regine Diego	HC

2024 Pre-Season roster

NU Lady Bulldogs
No.	Player	Position
1	Nathasza Bombita	OPP
2	Chaitlin Mauricio	S
3	Abegail Pono	S
4	Bella Belen (c)	OH
5	Shaira Jardio	L
6	Vangie Alinsug	OH
8	Sheena Toring	MB
9	Aishat Bello	MB
10	Alexa Mata	MB
12	Alyssa Solomon	OPP
13	Camilla Lamina	S
14	Erin Pangilinan	MB
16	Josline Salazar	OPP
17	Minerva Maaya	MB
18	Arah Panique	OH
19	Celine Marsh	OH
20	IC Cepada	L
21	Myrtle Escanlar	OH
23	Carlyn Tizon	OPP
	Sherwin Meneses	HC

2024 Invitationals roster

NU Lady Bulldogs
No.	Player	Position
1	Nathasza Bombita	OPP
2	Chaitlin Mauricio	S
3	Abegail Pono	S
4	Bella Belen	OH
5	Shaira Jardio	L
6	Vangie Alinsug	OH
7	Ruth Escanlar	OH
8	Sheena Toring	MB
9	Aishat Bello	MB
10	Alexa Mata	MB
13	Camilla Lamina	S
14	Erin Pangilinan (c)	MB
16	Josline Salazar	OPP
17	Minerva Maaya	MB
18	Arah Panique	OH
19	Celine Marsh	OH
20	IC Cepada	L
21	Myrtle Escanlar	OH
23	Carlyn Tizon	OPP
	Norman Miguel	HC

2023 Pre-Season roster

NU Lady Bulldogs
No.	Player	Position
1	Kaye Bombita	OP
2	Pearl Denura	L
3	Abegail Pono	S
4	Bella Belen	OH
5	Shaira Jardio	L
6	Vangie Alinsug	OH
8	Sheena Toring	MB
9	Aishat Bello	MB
10	Alexa Mata	MB
12	Alyssa Solomon	OP
13	Camilla Lamina	S
14	Erin Pangilinan (c)	MB
17	Minerva Maaya	MB
21	Myrtle Escanlar	OH
	Norman Miguel	HC

2022 Pre-Season roster

NU Lady Bulldogs
No.	Player	Position
1	Renee Mabilangan	S
2	Pearl Denura	L
3	Chiennie Arroyo	OH
4	Bella Belen	OH
6	Vangie Alinsug	OH
7	Cess Robles (c)	OH
8	Sheena Toring	MB
9	Jen Nierva	L
10	Alexa Mata	MB
11	Francine Osis	MB
12	Alyssa Solomon	OP
13	Camilla Lamina	S
14	Erin Pangilinan	OP
15	Jazlyn Ellarina	OP
16	Shaira Jardio	L
17	Minerva Maaya	MB
18	Joyme Cagande	S
21	Myrtle Escanlar	OH
	Loreanne Santiago	MB
	Merriene Maderazo	L
	Ray Karl Dimaculangan	HC

== Awards ==
=== Team ===
UAAP

NU Lady Bulldogs (partial awards)
Year	Season	Title	Ref
1953	16	Champions	
1956	19	Champions	
2014	76	3rd place	
2015	77	3rd place	
2022	84	Champions	
2023	85	Runner-up	
2024	86	Champions	
2025	87	Champions	
2026	88	Runner-up	

==== SSL ====
NU Lady Bulldogs
Year	Season	Title	Ref
2022	Pre-Season	Champions	
2023	Pre-Season	Champions	
2024	Invitationals	Champions	
2024	Pre-Season	Champions	
2025	Invitationals (Mindanao Leg)	Champions	
2025	Pre-Season	Champions	

==== SVL/PVL ====
NU Lady Bulldogs (partial awards)
Year	Season	Title	Ref
2013	1st	Champions	
2014	1st	Runners-up	
2015	Collegiate	Champions	
2015	Collegiate	Champions	
2017	Collegiate	Champions	

=== Individual ===
==== UAAP ====
UAAP awardees (partial)

NU Lady Bulldogs awardees
Year	Award	Player	Ref
2013	Rookie of the Year	Aiko Urdas	
2013	Best Attacker	Myla Pablo	
2013	Best Receiver; Best Digger	Jennylyn Reyes	
2014	Rookie of the Year; Best Attacker	Jaja Santiago	
2015	Best Attacker	Jaja Santiago	
2016	Best Attacker	Jaja Santiago	
2017	Best Scorer; Best Attacker; Best Blocker	Jaja Santiago	
2018	Season's MVP; Best Attacker	Jaja Santiago	
2019	1st Best Middle Blocker	Roselyn Doria	
2019	Best Server	Cess Robles	
2022	Season's MVP; Rookie of the Year; 1st Best Outside Spiker	Bella Belen	
2022	Finals MVP	Cess Robles	
2022	Best Opposite Spiker	Alyssa Solomon	
2022	2nd Best Middle Blocker	Sheena Toring	
2022	Best Setter	Camilla Lamina	
2022	Best Libero	Jen Nierva	
2024	Season's MVP; 1st Best Outside Spiker	Bella Belen	
2024	Finals MVP; Best Opposite Spiker	Alyssa Solomon	

==== SSL ====
SSL NU individual awardees

NU Lady Bulldogs awardees
Year	Tournament	Award	Player	Ref
2022	Pre-Season	Season's MVP; Best Opposite Spiker	Alyssa Jae Solomon	
2022	Pre-Season	2nd Best Outside Spiker	Bella Belen	
2022	Pre-Season	2nd Best Middle Blocker	Sheena Toring	
2023	Pre-Season	Season's MVP; Best Opposite Spiker	Alyssa Jae Solomon	
2023	Pre-Season	1st Best Outside Spiker	Bella Belen	
2023	Pre-Season	1st Best Middle Blocker	Erin Pangilinan	
2023	Pre-Season	Best Setter	Camilla Lamina	

==== SVL/PVL ====
Shakey's V-L/PVL awardees

NU Lady Bulldogs Shakey's VL/PVL awardees
Year	Conference	Award	Player	Ref
2011	1st	Best Blocker	Dindin Santiago-Manabat	
2011	1st	Best Digger	Jennylyn Reyes	
2013	1st	Conference MVP; Best Scorer	Dindin Santiago-Manabat	
2013	1st	Best Attacker	Myla Pablo	
2013	1st	Finals MVP; Best Setter	Rubie De Leon	
2013	1st	Best Digger	Jennylyn Reyes	
2014	1st	Conference MVP; Best Server	Dindin Santiago	
2015	Collegiate	Finals MVP	Myla Pablo	
2015	Collegiate	1st Best Middle Blocker	Jaja Santiago	
2015	Collegiate	Best Libero	Bia General	
2016	Collegiate	Conference MVP; 1st Best Middle Blocker	Jaja Santiago	
2016	Collegiate	2nd Best Outside Spiker	Jorelle Singh	
2016	Collegiate	Finals MVP	Jasmine Nabor	
2017	Collegiate	2nd Best Middle Blocker	Risa Sato	
2017	Collegiate	Best Libero	Gayle Rose Valdez	
2017	Collegiate	Conference MVP	Jaja Santiago	
2017	Collegiate	Finals MVP	Jasmine Nabor	

== Season-by-season records ==
Records starting UAAP Season 56

Champion	Runner-up	Third place

Year	Season	Field	Eliminations					Playoffs			Ref.
Year	Season	Field	Finish	GP	W	L	SPR	Round	Opponent	Result	Ref.
1993	56	8	7th					Did not qualify			
1994	57	7	6th					Did not qualify			
1995	58	8	6th					Did not qualify			
1996	59	8	6th					Did not qualify			
1997	60	7	7th					Did not qualify			
1998	61	8	7th					Did not qualify			
1999	62	8	7th					Did not qualify			
2000	63	8	6th					Did not qualify			
2001	64	8	7th					Did not qualify			
2002	65	8	7th					Did not qualify			
2003	66	8	8th					Did not qualify			
2004	67	8	8th					Did not qualify			
2005	68	8	8th	14	1	14	0.024	Did not qualify			
2007	69	8	7th	12	0	12	0.000	Did not qualify			
2008	70	8	6th	14	0	11	0.214	Did not qualify			
2009	71	8	8th	14	0	13	0.071	Did not qualify			
2010	72	8	7th	14	0	13	0.71	Did not qualify			
2011	73	8	5th	14	5	9	0.959	Did not qualify			
2012	74	8	7th	14	2	12	0.801	Did not qualify			
2013	75	8	4th	14	8	6	1.098	4th seed playoffs Final Four	UST Lady Tigresses #1 De La Salle Lady Spikers	W 1–0; L 0–1	
2014	76	8	2nd	14	12	2	1.190	Final Four	#3 Ateneo Lady Eagles	L 0–2	
2015	77	8	3rd	14	8	6	1.036	#1st Stepladder #2nd stepladder	#4 FEU Lady Tamaraws #2 De La Salle Lady Spikers	W 1–0; L 0–2	
2016	78	8	5th	14	7	7	1.032	Did not qualify			
2017	79	8	6th	14	7	7	0.963	Did not qualify			
2018	80	8	4th	14	7	7	0.955	Final Four	#1 De La Salle Lady Spikers	L	
2019	81	8	6th	14	4	10	0.863	Did not qualify			
2020	82	Tournament cancelled									
2021	83	Tournament cancelled									
2022	84	8	1st	14	14	0	8.400	Finals	#2 De La Salle Lady Spikers	W 2–0	
2023	85	8	2nd	14	11	3	2.333	Finals	#1 De La Salle Lady Spikers	L 0–2	
2024	86	8	1st	14	12	2	3.167	Finals	#2 UST Golden Tigresses	W 2–0	
2025	87	8	1st	14	12	2	1.217	Finals	#2 De La Salle Lady Spikers	W 2–0	
2026	88	8	2nd	14	10	4	1.947	Finals	#1 De La Salle Lady Spikers	L 0–2	

== Coaches ==
NU Lady Bulldogs
Head coach	UAAP Season		Ref
Head coach	From	To	Ref
Johnny Candoy	?	71	
Dante Alinsunurin	72		
Francis Vicente	73	75	
Edjet Mabbayad	76		
Ariel dela Cruz	77		
Roger Gorayeb	78	79	
Raymund Castillo	80		
Norman Miguel	81	82	
Ray Karl Dimaculangan	84	85	
Norman Miguel	86		
Sherwin Meneses	87		
Regine Diego	88		
Norman Miguel	89	–	

== Notable players ==
- Camilla Lamina (S)
- Jasmine Nabor (S)
- Rica Diolan (S)
- Jennifer Nierva (L)
- Jennylyn Reyes (L)
- Dindin Santiago-Manabat (MB)
- Erin Pangilinan (MB)
- Ivy Lacsina (MB)
- Jacque Acuña (MB)
- Jaja Santiago (MB)
- Risa Sato (MB)
- Roselyn Doria (MB)
- Sheena Toring (MB)
- Bella Belen (OH)
- Cess Robles (OH)
- Myla Pablo (OH)
- Alyssa Solomon (OP)
- Rizza Mandapat (OP)

Legend
S	Setter
L	Libero
MB	Middle Blocker
OH	Outside Hitter
OP	Opposite Hitter

== See also ==
- NU Bulldogs
- National University (Philippines)
- University Athletic Association of the Philippines
- NU Bulldogs volleyball
