= 2024 Shakey's Super League Pre-season Championship =

2024 collegiate volleyball competition

Tournament details
- Dates: September 27, 2024 – November 24, 2024
- Teams: 18
- Venue: 1

Final positions
- Champions: NU Lady Bulldogs (3rd title)
- Runners-up: De La Salle Lady Spikers
- Third place: FEU Lady Tamaraws
- Fourth place: UST Golden Tigresses

Tournament awards
- MVP: Mhicaela Belen
- Best Setter: Camilla Lamina
- Best OH: Mhicaela Belen; Angeline Poyos
- Best MB: Amie Provido; Jazlyn Ellarina
- Best OPP: Alyssa Solomon
- Best Libero: Shaira Mae Jardio

Tournament statistics
- Matches played: 57

The 2024 Shakey's Super League Pre-season Championship was the third edition of the collegiate volleyball competition organized by the Shakey's Super League and the third and final SSL tournament of 2024. The tournament started on September 27, 2024, and will be contested by all 18 teams from the University Athletic Association of the Philippines (UAAP) and National Collegiate Athletic Association (NCAA).

The NU Lady Bulldogs enter this tournament as two-time defending pre-season champions while also coming off their title run in the 2024 National Invitationals tournament.

== Participating teams ==
2024 Shakey's Super League Collegiate Pre-Season Tournament
Team	School	Collegiate league
Adamson Lady Falcons	Adamson University	UAAP
Arellano Lady Chiefs	Arellano University	NCAA
Ateneo Blue Eagles	Ateneo de Manila University	UAAP
Benilde Lady Blazers	De La Salle–College of Saint Benilde	NCAA
De La Salle Lady Spikers	De La Salle University	UAAP
EAC Lady Generals	Emilio Aguinaldo College	NCAA
FEU Lady Tamaraws	Far Eastern University	UAAP
JRU Lady Bombers	José Rizal University	NCAA
Letran Lady Knights	Colegio de San Juan de Letran	NCAA
Lyceum Lady Pirates	Lyceum of the Philippines University	NCAA
Mapua Lady Cardinals	Mapúa University	NCAA
NU Lady Bulldogs	National University	UAAP
Perpetual Lady Altas	University of Perpetual Help System DALTA	NCAA
San Beda Lady Red Spikers	San Beda University	NCAA
San Sebastian Lady Stags	San Sebastian College – Recoletos	NCAA
UE Lady Warriors	University of the East	UAAP
UP Fighting Maroons	University of the Philippines	UAAP
UST Golden Tigresses	University of Santo Tomas	UAAP

== Pool composition ==
All eighteen teams from the UAAP and NCAA will compete in this tournament. The teams are then divided into four pools. Pools A and B consist of five teams while Pools C and D consist of four teams. The pool composition is as follows:

Pool A	Pool B	Pool C	Pool D
NU Lady Bulldogs	UST Golden Tigresses	De La Salle Lady Spikers	FEU Lady Tamaraws
Arellano Lady Chiefs	Lyceum Lady Pirates	Letran Lady Knights	Benilde Lady Blazers
EAC Lady Generals	Mapua Lady Cardinals	JRU Lady Bombers	San Sebastian Lady Stags
Ateneo Blue Eagles	UE Lady Warriors	UP Fighting Maroons	Adamson Lady Falcons
San Beda Lady Red Spikers	Perpetual Lady Altas	—N/a	

== Venues ==
Preliminaries
Manila
Rizal Memorial Coliseum
Capacity: 6,100
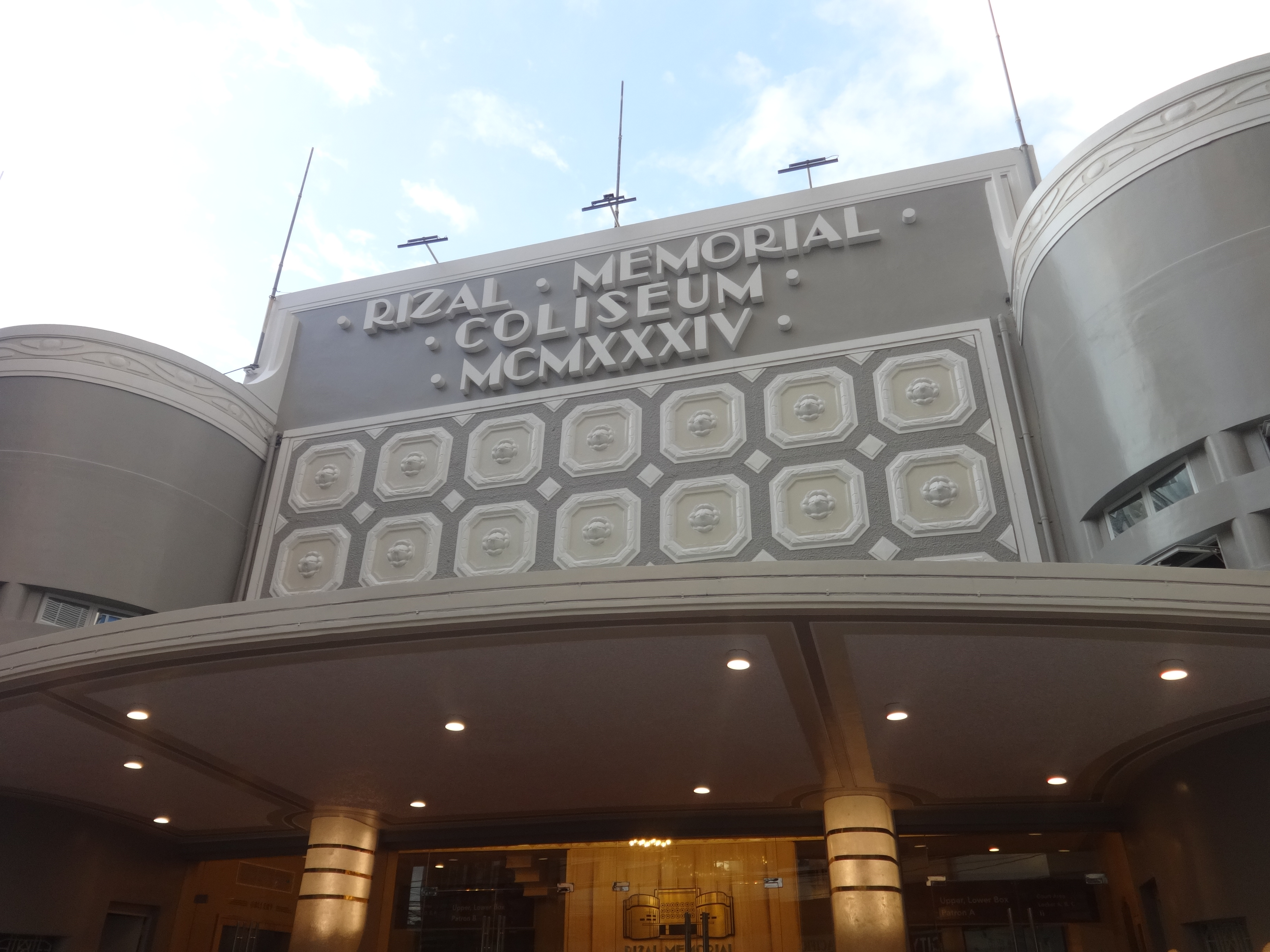

== Format ==
The format of this year's Pre-season Championship will remain unchanged, with its all-to-play rule still intact.

First round

1. Single-round robin format; 4 pools; Teams are ranked using the FIVB Ranking System.
2. The top two teams per pool will advance to the second round.

Second round

1. Single-round robin format; 2 pools; Teams are ranked using the FIVB Ranking System.
2. The W-L record in the first round will be carried over in the second round.
3. After another pool play, the eight teams will battle in the crossover quarterfinals.

Quarterfinals (twice-to-beat)

1. QF1: E1 vs. F4 (E1 twice-to-beat)
2. QF3: F2 vs. E3 (F2 twice-to-beat)
3. QF2: F1 vs. E4 (F1 twice-to-beat)
4. QF4: E2 vs. F3 (E2 twice-to-beat)

Semifinals (knockout stage)

1. SF1: QF #1 vs. QF #3
2. SF2: QF #2 vs. QF #4

Finals (Best-of-three series)

1. Bronze medal: SF1 Loser vs SF2 Loser
2. Gold medal: SF1 Winner vs SF2 Winner

== Pool standing procedure ==
- First, teams are ranked by the number of matches won.
- If the number of matches won is tied, the tied teams are then ranked by match points, wherein:
  - Match won 3–0 or 3–1: 3 match points for the winner, 0 match points for the loser.
  - Match won 3–2: 2 match points for the winner, 1 match point for the loser.
- In case of any further ties, the following criteria shall be used:
  - Set ratio: the number of sets won divided by number of sets lost.
  - Point ratio: number of points scored divided by number of points allowed.
  - Head-to-head standings: any remaining tied teams are ranked based on the results of head-to-head matches involving the teams in question.

== First round ==
- All times are Philippine Standard Time (UTC+8:00).
- The top two teams per pool advance to the second round.

=== Pool A ===
Pos	Team	Pld	W	L	Pts	SW	SL	SR	SPW	SPL	SPR	Qualification
1	NU Lady Bulldogs	4	4	0	12	12	1	12.000	325	183	1.776	Second round
2	Ateneo Blue Eagles	4	3	1	8	10	5	2.000	329	297	1.108	Second round
3	Arellano Lady Chiefs	4	2	2	5	6	8	0.750	268	280	0.957	
4	San Beda Lady Red Spikers	4	1	3	5	7	9	0.778	302	352	0.858	
5	EAC Lady Generals	4	0	4	0	0	12	0.000	188	300	0.627	

Source: TeamPilipinas.info

Date	Time	Venue		Score		Set 1	Set 2	Set 3	Set 4	Set 5	Total	Report
Sep 28	18:00	RMC	Ateneo Blue Eagles	3–2	San Beda Lady Red Spikers	22–25	20–25	25–21	25–21	15–7	107–99	
Sep 29	15:30	RMC	EAC Lady Generals	0–3	Arellano Lady Chiefs	17–25	16–25	12–25			45–75	
Oct 4	15:30	RMC	San Beda Lady Red Spikers	2–3	Arellano Lady Chiefs	19–25	25–22	25–20	10–25	6–15	85–107	
Oct 4	18:00	RMC	NU Lady Bulldogs	3–1	Ateneo Blue Eagles	25–12	25–27	25–16	25–17		100–72	
Oct 11	14:00	RMC	EAC Lady Generals	0–3	NU Lady Bulldogs	15–25	7–25	13–25			35–75	
Oct 12	11:30	RMC	Arellano Lady Chiefs	0–3	Ateneo Blue Eagles	17–25	18–25	18–25			53–75	
Oct 12	14:00	RMC	San Beda Lady Red Spikers	3–0	EAC Lady Generals	25–18	25–23	25–22			75–63	
Oct 13	18:00	RMC	NU Lady Bulldogs	3–0	San Beda Lady Red Spikers	25–19	25–7	25–17			75–43	
Oct 16	15:30	RMC	Ateneo Blue Eagles	3–0	EAC Lady Generals	25–12	25–21	25–12			75–45	
Oct 18	18:00	RMC	Arellano Lady Chiefs	0–3	NU Lady Bulldogs	9–25	12–25	12–25			33–75	

=== Pool B ===
Pos	Team	Pld	W	L	Pts	SW	SL	SR	SPW	SPL	SPR	Qualification
1	UST Golden Tigresses	4	4	0	11	12	4	3.000	385	299	1.288	Second round
2	UE Lady Warriors	4	3	1	10	11	4	2.750	339	300	1.130	Second round
3	Lyceum Lady Pirates	4	2	2	5	8	9	0.889	358	377	0.950	
4	Mapúa Lady Cardinals	4	1	3	4	5	9	0.556	279	310	0.900	
5	Perpetual Lady Altas	4	0	4	0	2	12	0.167	264	319	0.828	

Source: TeamPilipinas.info

Date	Time	Venue		Score		Set 1	Set 2	Set 3	Set 4	Set 5	Total	Report
Sep 27	18:00	RMC	Lyceum Lady Pirates	1–3	UE Lady Warriors	26–24	21–25	22–25	14–25		83–99	
Sep 28	15:30	RMC	Mapúa Lady Cardinals	2–3	Lyceum Lady Pirates	9–25	25–19	25–20	24–26	12–15	95–105	
Oct 4	13:00	RMC	UE Lady Warriors	3–0	Perpetual Lady Altas	25–17	25–20	25–15			75–52	
Oct 5	13:00	RMC	Mapúa Lady Cardinals	0–3	UE Lady Warriors	14–25	20–25	20–25			54–75	
Oct 5	15:30	RMC	Lyceum Lady Pirates	1–3	UST Golden Tigresses	16–25	30–28	17–25	14–25		77–103	
Oct 6	13:00	RMC	UST Golden Tigresses	3–0	Mapúa Lady Cardinals	25–18	25–17	25–20			75–55	
Oct 11	18:00	RMC	Perpetual Lady Altas	1–3	UST Golden Tigresses	17–25	17–25	25–21	18–25		77–96	
Oct 13	15:30	RMC	UST Golden Tigresses	3–2	UE Lady Warriors	23–25	23–25	25–14	25–17	15–9	111–90	
Oct 16	13:00	RMC	Perpetual Lady Altas	1–3	Lyceum Lady Pirates	18–25	15–25	25–18	22–25		80–93	
Oct 18	13:00	RMC	Mapúa Lady Cardinals	3–0	Perpetual Lady Altas	25–22	25–23	25–20			75–65	

=== Pool C ===
Pos	Team	Pld	W	L	Pts	SW	SL	SR	SPW	SPL	SPR	Qualification
1	De La Salle Lady Spikers	3	3	0	9	9	2	4.500	266	197	1.350	Second round
2	UP Fighting Maroons	3	2	1	6	7	4	1.750	242	220	1.100	Second round
3	Letran Lady Knights	3	1	2	3	5	6	0.833	227	234	0.970	
4	JRU Lady Bombers	3	0	3	0	0	9	0.000	141	225	0.627	

Source: TeamPilipinas.info

Date	Time	Venue		Score		Set 1	Set 2	Set 3	Set 4	Set 5	Total	Report
Sep 28	13:00	RMC	UP Fighting Maroons	1–3	De La Salle Lady Spikers	14–25	25–18	24–26	12–25		75–94	
Sep 29	18:00	RMC	Letran Lady Knights	3–0	JRU Lady Bombers	25–21	25–10	25–14			75–45	
Oct 5	18:00	RMC	Letran Lady Knights	1–3	UP Fighting Maroons	25–17	18–25	18–25	23–25		84–92	
Oct 11	16:00	RMC	De La Salle Lady Spikers	3–1	Letran Lady Knights	25–7	25–21	22–25	25–15		97–68	
Oct 13	13:00	RMC	JRU Lady Bombers	0–3	De La Salle Lady Spikers	18–25	20–25	16–25			54–75	
Oct 18	15:30	RMC	UP Fighting Maroons	3–0	JRU Lady Bombers	25–13	25–19	25–10			75–42	

=== Pool D ===
Pos	Team	Pld	W	L	Pts	SW	SL	SR	SPW	SPL	SPR	Qualification
1	FEU Lady Tamaraws	3	3	0	8	9	3	3.000	293	243	1.206	Second round
2	Benilde Lady Blazers	3	2	1	6	7	3	2.333	217	207	1.048	Second round
3	Adamson Lady Falcons	3	1	2	4	5	6	0.833	242	236	1.025	
4	San Sebastian Lady Stags	3	0	3	0	0	9	0.000	159	225	0.707	

Source: TeamPilipinas.info

Date	Time	Venue		Score		Set 1	Set 2	Set 3	Set 4	Set 5	Total	Report
Sep 27	15:30	RMC	San Sebastian Lady Stags	0–3	FEU Lady Tamaraws	14–25	19–25	20–25			53–75	
Oct 6	15:30	RMC	Benilde Lady Blazers	1–3	FEU Lady Tamaraws	17–25	25–21	16–25	19–25		77–96	
Oct 6	18:00	RMC	Adamson Lady Falcons	3–0	San Sebastian Lady Stags	25–23	25–11	25–15			75–49	
Oct 12	16:00	RMC	FEU Lady Tamaraws	3–2	Adamson Lady Falcons	16–25	25–22	31–33	25–20	15–13	112–113	
Oct 16	18:00	RMC	Adamson Lady Falcons	0–3	Benilde Lady Blazers	13–25	22–25	19–25			54–75	
Oct 18	11:30	RMC	Benilde Lady Blazers	3–0	San Sebastian Lady Stags	25–19	25–18	25–20			75–57	

== Second round ==
- All times are Philippine Standard Time (UTC+8:00).

=== Pool E ===
Pos	Team	Pld	W	L	Pts	SW	SL	SR	SPW	SPL	SPR	Qualification
1	De La Salle Lady Spikers	3	3	0	9	9	2	4.500	270	235	1.149	Quarterfinals with twice-to-beat advantage
2	NU Lady Bulldogs	3	2	1	6	7	3	2.333	248	194	1.278	Quarterfinals with twice-to-beat advantage
3	UE Lady Warriors	3	1	2	3	4	6	0.667	211	234	0.902	Quarterfinals
4	Benilde Lady Blazers	3	0	3	0	0	9	0.000	159	225	0.707	Quarterfinals

Source: TeamPilipinas.info

Date	Time	Venue		Score		Set 1	Set 2	Set 3	Set 4	Set 5	Total	Report
Oct 20	14:00	RMC	UE Lady Warriors	3–0	Benilde Lady Blazers	25–19	25–18	25–23			75–60	
Oct 20	17:00	RMC	De La Salle Lady Spikers	3–1	NU Lady Bulldogs	32–30	14–25	25–22	25–21		96–98	
Oct 26	14:00	RMC	UE Lady Warriors	1–3	De La Salle Lady Spikers	25–23	24–26	20–25	16–25		85–99	
Oct 27	17:00	RMC	Benilde Lady Blazers	0–3	NU Lady Bulldogs	11–25	23–25	13–25			47–75	
Oct 30	11:00	RMC	NU Lady Bulldogs	3–0	UE Lady Warriors	25–14	25–20	25–17			75–51	
Oct 30	17:00	RMC	Benilde Lady Blazers	0–3	De La Salle Lady Spikers	13–25	23–25	16–25			52–75	

=== Pool F ===
Pos	Team	Pld	W	L	Pts	SW	SL	SR	SPW	SPL	SPR	Qualification
1	FEU Lady Tamaraws	3	3	0	8	9	2	4.500	260	217	1.198	Quarterfinals with twice-to-beat advantage
2	UST Golden Tigresses	3	2	1	6	6	3	2.000	217	177	1.226	Quarterfinals with twice-to-beat advantage
3	UP Fighting Maroons	3	1	2	4	5	6	0.833	225	246	0.915	Quarterfinals
4	Ateneo Blue Eagles	3	0	3	0	0	9	0.000	164	226	0.726	Quarterfinals

Source: TeamPilipinas.info

Date	Time	Venue		Score		Set 1	Set 2	Set 3	Set 4	Set 5	Total	Report
Oct 20	11:00	RMC	Ateneo Blue Eagles	0–3	UST Golden Tigresses	11–25	20–25	17–25			48–75	
Oct 26	11:00	RMC	UST Golden Tigresses	0–3	FEU Lady Tamaraws	21–25	23–25	23–25			67–75	
Oct 26	17:00	RMC	Ateneo Blue Eagles	0–3	UP Fighting Maroons	15–25	22–25	24–26			61–76	
Oct 27	11:00	RMC	UP Fighting Maroons	0–3	UST Golden Tigresses	14–25	19–25	21–25			54–75	
Oct 27	14:00	RMC	FEU Lady Tamaraws	3–0	Ateneo Blue Eagles	25–18	25–18	25–19			75–55	
Oct 30	14:00	RMC	UP Fighting Maroons	2–3	FEU Lady Tamaraws	13–25	25–23	19–25	25–22	13–15	95–110	

== Final round ==
- All times are Philippine Standard Time (UTC+8:00).

5th place match (Single-elimination)
November 16
Ateneo Blue Eagles	3
Benilde Lady Blazers	1
7th place match
November 16
UE Lady Warriors	3
UP Fighting Maroons	0

5th–8th semifinals (Single-elimination)
November 9
Ateneo Blue Eagles	3
UE Lady Warriors	0
November 6
Benilde Lady Blazers	3
UP Fighting Maroons	0

Quarterfinals (#1 and #2 with twice-to-beat advantage)
November 3
E1	De La Salle Lady Spikers	3
F4	Ateneo Blue Eagles	2
November 3
F2	UST Golden Tigresses	3
E3	UE Lady Warriors	0
November 3
F1	FEU Lady Tamaraws	3
E4	Benilde Lady Blazers	1
November 3
E2	NU Lady Bulldogs	3
F3	UP Fighting Maroons	0

Semifinals (Single-elimination)
November 6
De La Salle Lady Spikers	3
UST Golden Tigresses	2
November 9
FEU Lady Tamaraws	1
NU Lady Bulldogs	3

Championship (Best-of-three series)
November 22–24
De La Salle Lady Spikers	0	1
NU Lady Bulldogs	3	3
3rd place match
November 24
UST Golden Tigresses	2
FEU Lady Tamaraws	3

=== Quarterfinals ===
Date	Time	Venue		Score		Set 1	Set 2	Set 3	Set 4	Set 5	Total	Report
Nov 3	11:00	RMC	FEU Lady Tamaraws	3–1	Benilde Lady Blazers	21–25	25–20	25–17	25–17		96–79	
Nov 3	13:00	RMC	De La Salle Lady Spikers	3–2	Ateneo Blue Eagles	25–18	25–20	20–25	20–25	17–15	107–103	
Nov 3	16:00	RMC	NU Lady Bulldogs	3–0	UP Fighting Maroons	25–12	25–22	25–17			75–51	
Nov 3	18:00	RMC	UST Golden Tigresses	3–0	UE Lady Warriors	25–22	25–21	25–21			75–64	

=== 5th–8th semifinals ===
Date	Time	Venue		Score		Set 1	Set 2	Set 3	Set 4	Set 5	Total	Report
Nov 6	15:30	RMC	Benilde Lady Blazers	3–0	UP Fighting Maroons	25–14	25–19	25–20			75–53	
Nov 9	15:30	RMC	Ateneo Blue Eagles	3–0	UE Lady Warriors	25–21	25–17	25–22			75–60	

=== Semifinals ===
Date	Time	Venue		Score		Set 1	Set 2	Set 3	Set 4	Set 5	Total	Report
Nov 6	18:00	RMC	De La Salle Lady Spikers	3–2	UST Golden Tigresses	26–28	25–19	25–20	21–25	15–13	112–105	
Nov 9	18:00	RMC	FEU Lady Tamaraws	1–3	NU Lady Bulldogs	16–25	25–19	17–25	22–25		80–94	

=== 7th place match ===
Date	Time	Venue		Score		Set 1	Set 2	Set 3	Set 4	Set 5	Total	Report
Nov 16	15:30	RMC	UP Fighting Maroons	0–3	UE Lady Warriors	20–25	22–25	24–26			66–76	

=== 5th place match ===
Date	Time	Venue		Score		Set 1	Set 2	Set 3	Set 4	Set 5	Total	Report
Nov 16	18:00	RMC	Benilde Lady Blazers	1–3	Ateneo Blue Eagles	24–26	16–25	25–21	23–25		88–97	

=== Bronze medal match ===
Date	Time	Venue		Score		Set 1	Set 2	Set 3	Set 4	Set 5	Total	Report
Nov 24	13:00	RMC	UST Golden Tigresses	2–3	FEU Lady Tamaraws	25–20	19–25	25–23	19–25	12–15	100–108	

=== Gold medal match ===
Date	Time	Venue		Score		Set 1	Set 2	Set 3	Set 4	Set 5	Total	Report
Nov 22	18:30	RMC	De La Salle Lady Spikers	0–3	NU Lady Bulldogs	16–25	12–25	25–27			53–77	
Nov 24	17:00	RMC	NU Lady Bulldogs	3–1	De La Salle Lady Spikers	23–25	25–18	25–16	25–20		98–79	

== Final standing ==
Rank	Team
1st place, gold medalist(s)	NU Lady Bulldogs
2nd place, silver medalist(s)	De La Salle Lady Spikers
3rd place, bronze medalist(s)	FEU Lady Tamaraws
4	UST Golden Tigresses
5	Ateneo Blue Eagles
6	Benilde Lady Blazers
7	UE Lady Warriors
8	UP Fighting Maroons
9	Lyceum Lady Pirates
10	Arellano Lady Chiefs
11	Adamson Lady Falcons
12	Letran Lady Knights
13	San Beda Lady Red Spikers
14	Mapua Lady Cardinals
15	Perpetual Lady Altas
16	San Sebastian Lady Stags
17	JRU Lady Bombers
18	EAC Lady Generals

2024 Shakey's Super League Pre-Season champions
NU Lady Bulldogs
3rd title

Team Roster
Mhicaela Belen (c), Alyssa Solomon, Camilla Lamina, Erin May Pangilinan, Sheena Toring, Evangeline Alinsug, Shaira Mae Jardio, Alexa Mata, Minierva Maaya, Arah Ellah Panique, Nataszha Kaye Bombita, Chaitlin Mauricio, Abegail Pono, Aishat Bello, IC Cepada, Josline Salazar, Celine Marsh, Myrtle Escanlar, Carlyn Tizon
Head coach
Sherwin Meneses

== Awards and medalists ==
=== Individual awards ===
Award	Player	Team	Ref.
Most Valuable Player	Mhicaela Belen	NU Lady Bulldogs	
1st Best Outside Spiker	Mhicaela Belen	NU Lady Bulldogs	
2nd Best Outside Spiker	Angeline Poyos	UST Golden Tigresses	
1st Best Middle Blocker	Amie Provido	De La Salle Lady Spikers	
2nd Best Middle Blocker	Jazlyn Ellarina	FEU Lady Tamaraws	
Best Opposite Spiker	Alyssa Solomon	NU Lady Bulldogs	
Best Setter	Camilla Lamina	NU Lady Bulldogs	
Best Libero	Shaira Mae Jardio	NU Lady Bulldogs	

=== Medalists ===
Gold	Silver	Bronze
NU Lady Bulldogs: Mhicaela Belen (c); Alyssa Solomon; Camilla Lamina; Erin May Pangilinan; Sheena Toring; Evangeline Alinsug; Shaira Mae Jardio; Alexa Mata; Minierva Maaya; Arah Ellah Panique; Nataszha Kaye Bombita; Chaitlin Mauricio; Abegail Pono; Aishat Bello; IC Cepada; Josline Salazar; Celine Marsh; Myrtle Escanlar; Carlyn Tizon Head Coach: Sherwin Meneses	De La Salle Lady Spikers: Angel Canino (c); Shevana Maria Nicola Laput; Alleiah Malaluan; Amie Provido; Baby Jyne Soreño; Mary Shane Reterta; Julyana Tolentino; Katrina Del Castillo; Mikole Reyes; Lyka De Leon; Maria Michaela Santos; Julianna Marie Estudillo; Francesca Sofia Rodriguez; Ma. Jessa Ordiales; Riane Ashley Gonzales; Amor Klarisse Guinto; Eshana Rose Nunag; Jhianna Mae De Jesus; Vida Dominique Caringal; Sandy Patricia Demain; Irina Glenne Escandor; Maile Salang Head Coach: Ramil De Jesus	FEU Lady Tamaraws: Christine Ubaldo (c); Chenie Tagaod; Mitzi Panangin; Jazlyn Anne Ellarina; Gerzel Mary Petallo; Jean Asis; Julianne Monares; Ann Roselle Asis; Alyzza Gaile Devosora; Karyme Isabella Truz; Margaret Louise Encarnacion; Karyll Miranda; Clarisse Loresco; Kyle Pendon; Faida Bakanke; Nikka Anne Medina; Frenchie Premaylon; Niña Beatrice Maluto; Patricia Leanne Jan Arciaga; Christine Dominique Ramos Head Coach: Tina Salak
