= 2022 Shakey's Super League Pre-season Championship =

2022 collegiate volleyball competition

Tournament details
- Dates: September 24 – November 19, 2022
- Teams: 18
- Venue: Rizal Memorial Coliseum

Final positions
- Champions: NU Lady Bulldogs (1st title)
- Runners-up: De La Salle Lady Spikers
- Third place: Adamson Lady Falcons
- Fourth place: UST Golden Tigresses

Tournament awards
- MVP: Alyssa Jae Solomon
- Best Setter: Louie Romero
- Best OH: Angel Anne Canino; Mhicaela Belen
- Best MB: Thea Allison Gagate; Sheena Angela Toring
- Best OPP: Alyssa Jae Solomon
- Best Libero: Ma. Bernadett Pepito

Tournament statistics
- Matches played: 56

The 2022 Shakey's Super League Pre-season Championship was the inaugural edition of the collegiate pre-season competition organized by the Shakey's Super League. It is also the first tournament for the SSL in general and the only such in 2022. The tournament was held on September 24 to November 19, 2022, at Rizal Memorial Coliseum, Manila. It features 18 collegiate teams from the two most prominent collegiate athletics associations in the country — NCAA and UAAP.

NU Lady Bulldogs defeated De La Salle Lady Spikers (3–0) in the championship match and crowned as the inaugural champions of the tournament. De La Salle Lady Spikers settled for silver. Adamson Lady Falcons won the bronze after a hard-fought 5 sets against UST Golden Tigresses in the 3rd place match.

== Participating teams ==
2022 Shakey's Super League Collegiate Pre-Season Tournament
Team	School	Collegiate league
Adamson Lady Falcons	Adamson University	UAAP
Arellano Lady Chiefs	Arellano University	NCAA
Ateneo Blue Eagles	Ateneo de Manila University	UAAP
Benilde Lady Blazers	De La Salle–College of Saint Benilde	NCAA
De La Salle Lady Spikers	De La Salle University	UAAP
EAC Lady Generals	Emilio Aguinaldo College	NCAA
FEU Lady Tamaraws	Far Eastern University	UAAP
JRU Lady Bombers	José Rizal University	NCAA
Letran Lady Knights	Colegio de San Juan de Letran	NCAA
Lyceum Lady Pirates	Lyceum of the Philippines University	NCAA
Mapúa Lady Cardinals	Mapúa University	NCAA
NU Lady Bulldogs	National University	UAAP
Perpetual Lady Altas	University of Perpetual Help System DALTA	NCAA
San Beda Lady Red Spikers	San Beda University	NCAA
San Sebastian Lady Stags	San Sebastian College – Recoletos	NCAA
UE Lady Warriors	University of the East	UAAP
UP Fighting Maroons	University of the Philippines	UAAP
UST Golden Tigresses	University of Santo Tomas	UAAP

== Pool composition ==
The teams are grouped via casting lots. Pools A and B will have 5 teams (3 NCAA, 2 UAAP), and Pools C and D will have 4 teams (2 NCAA, 2 UAAP). The overview of pools was released on September 10, 2022.

First round

Pool A	Pool B	Pool C	Pool D
Mapúa Lady Cardinals	Adamson Lady Falcons	Arellano Lady Chiefs	Benilde Lady Blazers
Perpetual Lady Altas	EAC Lady Generals	Ateneo Blue Eagles	De La Salle Lady Spikers
San Beda Lady Red Spikers	Lyceum Lady Pirates	JRU Lady Bombers	FEU Lady Tamaraws
UE Lady Warriors	San Sebastian Lady Stags	NU Lady Bulldogs	Letran Lady Knights
UP Fighting Maroons	UST Golden Tigresses	—N/a	

Second round

Pool E	Pool F
UP Fighting Maroons (Pool A 1st)	UST Golden Tigresses (Pool B 1st)
NU Lady Bulldogs (Pool C 1st)	De La Salle Lady Spikers (Pool D 1st)
Perpetual Lady Altas (Pool A 2nd)	Adamson Lady Falcons (Pool B 2nd)
Ateneo Blue Eagles (Pool C 2nd)	FEU Lady Tamaraws (Pool D 2nd)

== Venue ==
All matches
City of Manila
Rizal Memorial Coliseum
Capacity: 6,100
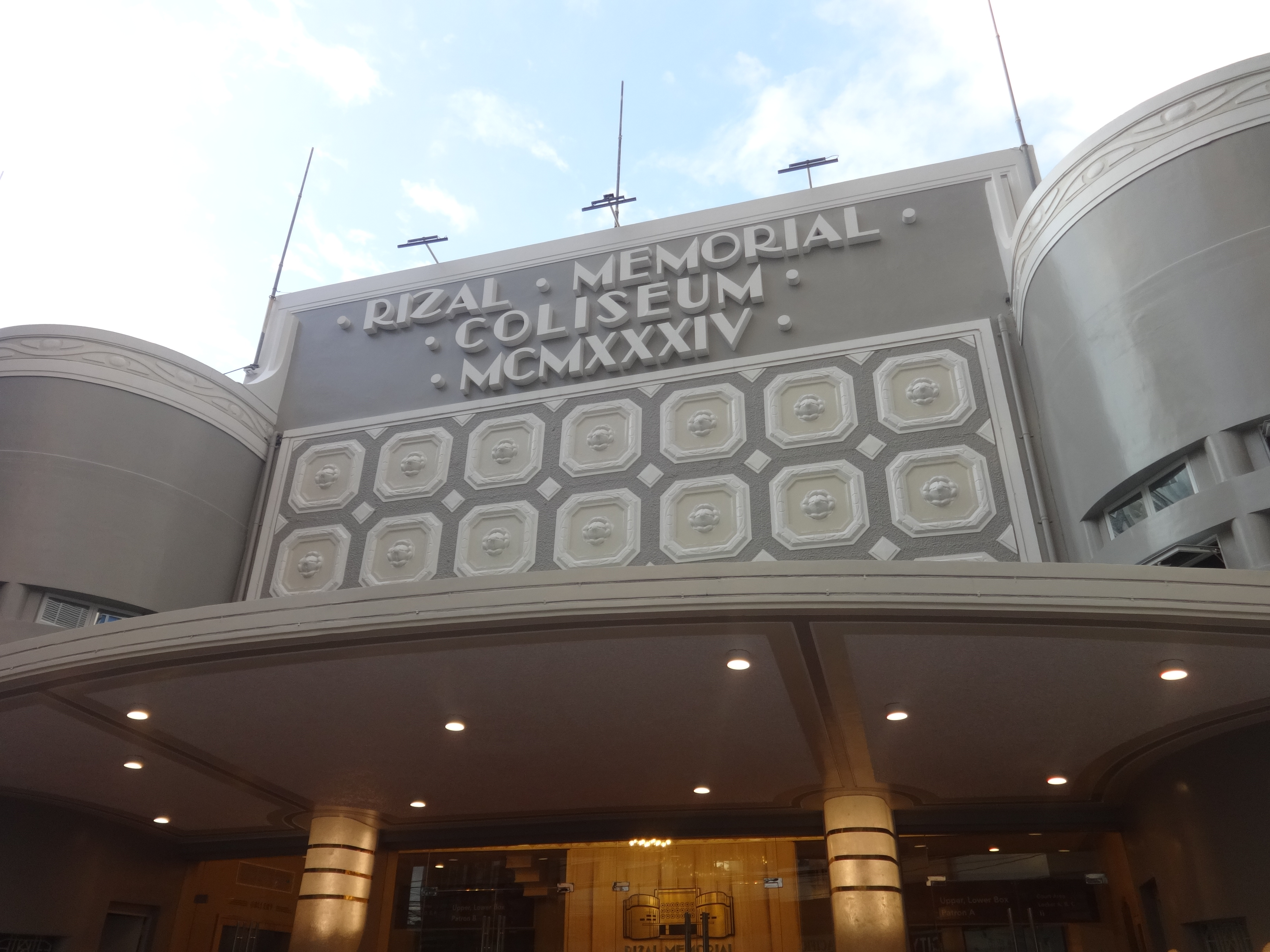

== Format ==
This tournament will implement the "All to Play" system in its games, where teams will field all the players on the roster who will be given a chance to play in a match. It is a system where a team will be fielding different players (except Libero) to play in the first two sets. The substitution will take effect when the set score reaches 16. Starting from the 3rd set onwards, the standard play will return. This is the competition format that will be conducted for the entirety of the conference.

First round

1. Single-round robin format; 4 pools; Teams are ranked using the FIVB Ranking System.
2. The top two teams per pool will advance to the second round.

Second round

1. Single-round robin format; 2 pools; Teams are ranked using the FIVB Ranking System.
2. The W-L record in the first round will be carried over in the second round.
3. After another pool play, the eight teams will battle in the crossover quarterfinals.

Quarterfinals (knockout stage)

1. QF1: E1 vs. F4
2. QF3: F2 vs. E3
3. QF2: F1 vs. E4
4. QF4: E2 vs. F3

Semifinals (knockout stage)

1. SF1: QF #1 vs. QF #3
2. SF2: QF #2 vs. QF #4

Finals (knockout stage)

1. Bronze medal: SF1 Loser vs SF2 Loser
2. Gold medal: SF1 Winner vs SF2 Winner

== Pool standing procedure ==
1. Number of matches won
2. Match points
3. Sets ratio
4. Points ratio
5. If the tie continues as per the point ratio between two teams, the priority will be given to the team which won the last match between them. When the tie in points ratio is between three or more teams, a new classification of these teams in the terms of points 1, 2 and 3 will be made taking into consideration only the matches in which they were opposed to each other.

Match won 3–0 or 3–1: 3 match points for the winner, 0 match points for the loser

Match won 3–2: 2 match points for the winner, 1 match point for the loser.

== First round ==
- All times are Philippine Standard Time (UTC+8:00).
- The top two teams per pool advance to the second round.

=== Pool A ===
Pos	Team	Pld	W	L	Pts	SW	SL	SR	SPW	SPL	SPR	Qualification
1	UP Fighting Maroons	4	4	0	10	12	4	3.000	353	291	1.213	Second round
2	Perpetual Lady Altas	4	3	1	10	11	4	2.750	352	319	1.103	Second round
3	UE Lady Warriors	4	2	2	6	8	9	0.889	375	368	1.019	Classification round
4	Mapúa Lady Cardinals	4	1	3	3	5	11	0.455	297	312	0.952	Classification round
5	San Beda Lady Red Spikers	4	0	4	1	4	12	0.333	330	393	0.840	Classification round

Date	Time		Score		Set 1	Set 2	Set 3	Set 4	Set 5	Total	Report
24 Sep	12:00	UE Lady Warriors	3–2	Mapúa Lady Cardinals	31–33	25–20	25–23	21–25	15–12	117–113	
24 Sep	14:00	San Beda Lady Red Spikers	1–3	Perpetual Lady Altas	26–24	21–25	23–25	25–27		95–101	
1 Oct	12:30	Perpetual Lady Altas	3–0	UE Lady Warriors	25–22	27–25	25–16			77–63	
2 Oct	10:00	Perpetual Lady Altas	2–3	UP Fighting Maroons	25–10	23–25	25–22	15–25	10–15	98–97	
2 Oct	15:00	Mapúa Lady Cardinals	3–2	San Beda Lady Red Spikers	23–25	35–33	25–22	21–25	16–14	120–119	
8 Oct	17:30	UE Lady Warriors	3–1	San Beda Lady Red Spikers	25–8	25–20	22–25	25–19		97–72	
9 Oct	15:00	UP Fighting Maroons	3–2	UE Lady Warriors	21–25	25–17	25–21	20–25	15–10	106–98	
15 Oct	12:30	Mapúa Lady Cardinals	0–3	Perpetual Lady Altas	24–26	22–25	18–25			64–76	
16 Oct	15:00	San Beda Lady Red Spikers	0–3	UP Fighting Maroons	19–25	7–25	18–25			44–75	
22 Oct	10:00	UP Fighting Maroons	3–0	Mapúa Lady Cardinals	25–19	25–21	25–11			75–51	

=== Pool B ===
Pos	Team	Pld	W	L	Pts	SW	SL	SR	SPW	SPL	SPR	Qualification
1	UST Golden Tigresses	4	4	0	11	12	2	6.000	336	271	1.240	Second round
2	Adamson Lady Falcons	4	3	1	10	11	3	3.667	336	253	1.328	Second round
3	Lyceum Lady Pirates	4	2	2	6	6	8	0.750	305	320	0.953	Classification round
4	San Sebastian Lady Stags	4	1	3	4	5	9	0.556	255	294	0.867	Classification round
5	EAC Lady Generals	4	0	4	0	1	12	0.083	228	322	0.708	Classification round

Date	Time		Score		Set 1	Set 2	Set 3	Set 4	Set 5	Total	Report
24 Sep	18:00	Adamson Lady Falcons	2–3	UST Golden Tigresses	20–25	29–27	25–15	27–29	10–15	111–111	
1 Oct	10:00	San Sebastian Lady Stags	0–3	UST Golden Tigresses	18–25	21–25	16–25			55–75	
2 Oct	12:30	Adamson Lady Falcons	3–0	San Sebastian Lady Stags	25–10	25–14	25–18			75–42	
8 Oct	10:00	Lyceum Lady Pirates	3–1	EAC Lady Generals	25–23	25–18	22–25	25–21		97–87	
9 Oct	17:30	San Sebastian Lady Stags	1–3	Lyceum Lady Pirates	19–25	25–22	21–25	18–25		83–97	
15 Oct	10:00	San Sebastian Lady Stags	3–0	EAC Lady Generals	25–13	25–13	25–21			75–47	
16 Oct	10:00	EAC Lady Generals	0–3	UST Golden Tigresses	13–25	19–25	15–25			47–75	
16 Oct	12:30	Adamson Lady Falcons	3–0	Lyceum Lady Pirates	25–15	25–22	25–16			75–53	
22 Oct	15:00	EAC Lady Generals	0–3	Adamson Lady Falcons	14–25	14–25	19–25			47–75	
22 Oct	17:30	UST Golden Tigresses	3–0	Lyceum Lady Pirates	25–17	25–19	25–22			75–58	

=== Pool C ===
Pos	Team	Pld	W	L	Pts	SW	SL	SR	SPW	SPL	SPR	Qualification
1	NU Lady Bulldogs	3	3	0	9	9	1	9.000	241	143	1.685	Second round
2	Ateneo Blue Eagles	3	2	1	6	7	3	2.333	226	196	1.153	Second round
3	Arellano Lady Chiefs	3	1	2	3	3	6	0.500	174	214	0.813	Classification round
4	JRU Lady Bombers	3	0	3	0	0	9	0.000	137	225	0.609	Classification round

Date	Time		Score		Set 1	Set 2	Set 3	Set 4	Set 5	Total	Report
1 Oct	15:00	Ateneo Blue Eagles	3–0	Arellano Lady Chiefs	25–14	30–28	25–17			80–59	
2 Oct	17:30	JRU Lady Bombers	0–3	Arellano Lady Chiefs	21–25	21–25	17–25			59–75	
9 Oct	10:00	NU Lady Bulldogs	3–0	JRU Lady Bombers	25–14	25–6	25–12			75–32	
15 Oct	15:00	Ateneo Blue Eagles	3–0	JRU Lady Bombers	25–20	25–16	25–10			75–46	
15 Oct	17:30	Arellano Lady Chiefs	0–3	NU Lady Bulldogs	9–25	17–25	14–25			40–75	
16 Oct	17:30	NU Lady Bulldogs	3–1	Ateneo Blue Eagles	25–8	25–19	16–25	25–19		91–71	

=== Pool D ===
Pos	Team	Pld	W	L	Pts	SW	SL	SR	SPW	SPL	SPR	Qualification
1	De La Salle Lady Spikers	3	3	0	8	9	3	3.000	277	221	1.253	Second round
2	FEU Lady Tamaraws	3	2	1	6	8	5	1.600	288	259	1.112	Second round
3	Benilde Lady Blazers	3	1	2	4	6	6	1.000	265	253	1.047	Classification round
4	Letran Lady Knights	3	0	3	0	0	9	0.000	140	229	0.611	Classification round

Date	Time		Score		Set 1	Set 2	Set 3	Set 4	Set 5	Total	Report
24 Sep	16:00	Benilde Lady Blazers	2–3	FEU Lady Tamaraws	20–25	26–24	25–19	20–25	11–15	102–108	
1 Oct	17:30	FEU Lady Tamaraws	2–3	De La Salle Lady Spikers	13–25	25–19	25–21	22–25	8–15	93–105	
8 Oct	12:30	FEU Lady Tamaraws	3–0	Letran Lady Knights	25–12	27–25	25–15			77–52	
8 Oct	15:00	De La Salle Lady Spikers	3–1	Benilde Lady Blazers	22–25	25–22	25–22	25–19		97–88	
9 Oct	12:30	De La Salle Lady Spikers	3–0	Letran Lady Knights	25–13	25–9	25–18			75–40	
22 Oct	12:30	Letran Lady Knights	0–3	Benilde Lady Blazers	12–25	17–25	19–25			48–75	

== Second round ==
- All times are Philippine Standard Time (UTC+8:00).

=== Pool E ===
Pos	Team	Pld	W	L	Pts	SW	SL	SR	SPW	SPL	SPR	Qualification
1	NU Lady Bulldogs	3	3	0	9	9	1	9.000	241	169	1.426	Quarterfinals
2	Ateneo Blue Eagles	3	2	1	6	7	4	1.750	237	245	0.967	Quarterfinals
3	UP Fighting Maroons	3	1	2	2	4	8	0.500	239	262	0.912	Quarterfinals
4	Perpetual Lady Altas	3	0	3	1	2	9	0.222	208	249	0.835	Quarterfinals

Date	Time		Score		Set 1	Set 2	Set 3	Set 4	Set 5	Total	Report
30 Oct	16:00	Ateneo Blue Eagles	3–0	Perpetual Lady Altas	25–21	26–24	26–24			77–69	
30 Oct	18:30	NU Lady Bulldogs	3–0	UP Fighting Maroons	25–21	25–16	25–20			75–57	
5 Nov	10:00	Perpetual Lady Altas	0–3	NU Lady Bulldogs	17–25	7–25	17–25			41–75	
5 Nov	18:00	UP Fighting Maroons	1–3	Ateneo Blue Eagles	22–25	16–25	25–14	22–25		85–89	

=== Pool F ===
Pos	Team	Pld	W	L	Pts	SW	SL	SR	SPW	SPL	SPR	Qualification
1	Adamson Lady Falcons	3	2	1	7	8	4	2.000	285	251	1.135	Quarterfinals
2	UST Golden Tigresses	3	2	1	5	7	6	1.167	296	295	1.003	Quarterfinals
3	De La Salle Lady Spikers	3	2	1	5	6	6	1.000	267	255	1.047	Quarterfinals
4	FEU Lady Tamaraws	3	0	3	1	4	9	0.444	170	204	0.833	Quarterfinals

Date	Time		Score		Set 1	Set 2	Set 3	Set 4	Set 5	Total	Report
30 Oct	10:00	FEU Lady Tamaraws	1–3	Adamson Lady Falcons	15–25	26–24	18–25	18–25		77–99	
30 Oct	12:30	De La Salle Lady Spikers	3–1	UST Golden Tigresses	22–25	27–25	25–16	25–21		99–87	
5 Nov	12:30	UST Golden Tigresses	3–1	FEU Lady Tamaraws	25–21	25–18	23–25	25–21		98–85	
5 Nov	15:00	Adamson Lady Falcons	3–0	De La Salle Lady Spikers	25–22	25–20	25–21			75–63	

== Classification round ==
- All times are Philippines Standard Time (UTC+08:00)
- The teams who are failed to qualify to the second round will face a final knockout match against teams who share a same placing from other pools (A and B, C and D).

=== 17th place match ===
Date	Time		Score		Set 1	Set 2	Set 3	Set 4	Set 5	Total	Report
23 Oct	10:00	San Beda Lady Red Spikers	3–1	EAC Lady Generals	25–20	19–25	25–21	25–20		94–86	

=== 15th place match ===
Date	Time		Score		Set 1	Set 2	Set 3	Set 4	Set 5	Total	Report
23 Oct	12:30	San Sebastian Lady Stags	3–0	Mapúa Lady Cardinals	25–21	25–17	25–19			75–57	

=== 13th place match ===
Date	Time		Score		Set 1	Set 2	Set 3	Set 4	Set 5	Total	Report
23 Oct	15:00	Letran Lady Knights	3–0	JRU Lady Bombers	25–19	25–18	28–26			78–63	

=== 11th place match ===
Date	Time		Score		Set 1	Set 2	Set 3	Set 4	Set 5	Total	Report
23 Oct	17:30	Arellano Lady Chiefs	0–3	Benilde Lady Blazers	21–25	22–25	20–25			63–75	

=== 9th place match ===
Date	Time		Score		Set 1	Set 2	Set 3	Set 4	Set 5	Total	Report
23 Oct^{a}	19:00	UE Lady Warriors	0–0	Lyceum Lady Pirates	0–0	0–0	0–0			0–0	

Note:

a.The match between UE and Lyceum was cancelled due to health and safety protocols.

== Final round ==
- All times are Philippine Standard Time (UTC+8:00).

5th place match
November 19
UP Fighting Maroons	1
Ateneo Blue Eagles	3
7th place match
November 19
FEU Lady Tamaraws	3
Perpetual Lady Altas	1

5th–8th semifinals
November 11
FEU Lady Tamaraws	2
UP Fighting Maroons	3
November 11
Perpetual Lady Altas	1
Ateneo Blue Eagles	3

Quarterfinals
November 6
E1	NU Lady Bulldogs	3
F4	FEU Lady Tamaraws	0
November 6
F2	UST Golden Tigresses	3
E3	UP Fighting Maroons	2
November 6
F1	Adamson Lady Falcons	3
E4	Perpetual Lady Altas	0
November 6
E2	Ateneo Blue Eagles	0
F3	De La Salle Lady Spikers	3

Semifinals
November 11
NU Lady Bulldogs	3
UST Golden Tigresses	1
November 11
Adamson Lady Falcons	2
De La Salle Lady Spikers	3

Championship
November 19
NU Lady Bulldogs	3
De La Salle Lady Spikers	0
3rd place match
November 19
UST Golden Tigresses	2
Adamson Lady Falcons	3

=== Quarterfinals ===
Date	Time		Score		Set 1	Set 2	Set 3	Set 4	Set 5	Total	Report
6 Nov	10:00	NU Lady Bulldogs	3–0	FEU Lady Tamaraws	25–10	25–17	25–17			75–44	
6 Nov	12:30	Adamson Lady Falcons	3–0	Perpetual Lady Altas	25–14	25–16	25–16			75–46	
6 Nov	16:00	Ateneo Blue Eagles	0–3	De La Salle Lady Spikers	17–25	23–25	10–25			50–75	
6 Nov	18:30	UST Golden Tigresses	3–2	UP Fighting Maroons	27–25	26–28	25–18	22–25	17–15	117–111	

=== 5th–8th semifinals ===
Date	Time		Score		Set 1	Set 2	Set 3	Set 4	Set 5	Total	Report
11 Nov	10:00	FEU Lady Tamaraws	2–3	UP Fighting Maroons	24–26	26–28	29–27	25–22	8–15	112–118	
11 Nov	16:00	Perpetual Lady Altas	1–3	Ateneo Blue Eagles	23–25	25–18	18–25	22–25		88–93	

=== 7th place match ===
Date	Time		Score		Set 1	Set 2	Set 3	Set 4	Set 5	Total	Report
19 Nov	09:00	FEU Lady Tamaraws	3–1	Perpetual Lady Altas	25–18	25–10	25–27	25-17		100–55	

=== 5th place match ===
Date	Time		Score		Set 1	Set 2	Set 3	Set 4	Set 5	Total	Report
19 Nov	11:30	UP Fighting Maroons	1–3	Ateneo Blue Eagles	17–25	27–25	20–25	12–25		76–100	

=== Semifinals ===
Date	Time		Score		Set 1	Set 2	Set 3	Set 4	Set 5	Total	Report
11 Nov	12:30	NU Lady Bulldogs	3–1	UST Golden Tigresses	25–23	23–25	25–21	25–17		98–86	
11 Nov	18:30	Adamson Lady Falcons	2–3	De La Salle Lady Spikers	16–25	25–18	23–25	25–22	8–15	97–105	

=== 3rd place match ===
Date	Time		Score		Set 1	Set 2	Set 3	Set 4	Set 5	Total	Report
19 Nov	14:00	UST Golden Tigresses	2–3	Adamson Lady Falcons	27–25	20–25	25–16	22–25	11–15	105–106	

=== Championship ===
Date	Time		Score		Set 1	Set 2	Set 3	Set 4	Set 5	Total	Report
19 Nov	16:30	NU Lady Bulldogs	3–0	De La Salle Lady Spikers	25–23	25–20	25–20			75–63	

== Final standing ==
Rank	Team
1st place, gold medalist(s)	NU Lady Bulldogs
2nd place, silver medalist(s)	De La Salle Lady Spikers
3rd place, bronze medalist(s)	Adamson Lady Falcons
4	UST Golden Tigresses
5	Ateneo Blue Eagles
6	UP Fighting Maroons
7	FEU Lady Tamaraws
8	Perpetual Lady Altas
9	UE Lady Warriors
9	Lyceum Lady Pirates
11	Benilde Lady Blazers
12	Arellano Lady Chiefs
13	Letran Lady Knights
14	JRU Lady Bombers
15	San Sebastian Lady Stags
16	Mapúa Lady Cardinals
17	San Beda Lady Red Spikers
18	EAC Lady Generals

2022 SSL Collegiate Pre-Season champions

NU Lady Bulldogs
1st title

Team Roster
Pearl Ann Denura, Renee Mabilangan, Chinee Pia Arroyo, Mhicaela Belen, Kate Maderazo, Evangeline Alinsug, Princess Anne Robles (c), Sheena Angela Toring, Jennifer Nierva, Alexa Mata, Francine Anne Osis, Alyssa Jae Solomon, Camilla Victoria Lamina, Erin May Pangilinan, Jazlyn Anne Ellarina, Shaira May Jardio, Minierva Maaya, Joyme Cagande, Myrtle Escanlar
Head coach
Ray Karl Dimaculangan

== Awards and medalists ==
=== Individual awards ===
Award	Player	Team	Ref
Most Valuable Player	Alyssa Jae Solomon	NU Lady Bulldogs	
1st Best Outside Spiker	Angel Anne Canino	De La Salle Lady Spikers	
2nd Best Outside Spiker	Mhicaela Belen	NU Lady Bulldogs	
1st Best Middle Blocker	Thea Allison Gagate	De La Salle Lady Spikers	
2nd Best Middle Blocker	Sheena Angela Toring	NU Lady Bulldogs	
Best Opposite Spiker	Alyssa Jae Solomon	NU Lady Bulldogs	
Best Setter	Louie Romero	Adamson Lady Falcons	
Best Libero	Ma. Bernadett Pepito	UST Golden Tigresses	

=== Medalists ===
Gold	Silver	Bronze
NU Lady Bulldogs 7 Princess Anne Robles (c); 1 Pearl Ann Denura; 2 Renee Mabilangan; 3 Chinee Pia Arroyo; 4 Mhicaela Belen; 5 Kate Maderazo; 6 Evangeline Alinsug; 8 Sheena Angela Toring; 9 Jennifer Nierva; 10 Alexa Mata; 11 Francine Anne Osis; 12 Alyssa Jae Solomon; 13 Camilla Victoria Lamina; 14 Erin May Pangilinan; 15 Jazlyn Anne Ellarina; 16 Shaira May Jardio; 17 Minierva Maaya; 18 Joyme Cagande; 21 Myrtle Escanlar Head coach: Ray Karl Dimaculangan	De La Salle Lady Spikers 11 Marionne Alba (c); 1 Christine Ordialles; 2 Mereophe Sharma; 3 Thea Allison Gagate; 4 Leila Jane Cruz; 5 Yzilith Justine Jazareno; 6 Alleiah Jan Malaluan; 7 Jade Fuentes; 8 Jolina Dela Cruz; 9 Julia Cyrille Coronel; 10 Princess Larroza; 12 Angel Anne Canino; 13 Julyana Tolentino; 15 Amie Provido; 16 Baby Jyne Soreño; 17 Ynna Nicole Hatulan; 18 Marite Espina; 19 Guilliana Torres; 20 Julianne Rose Levina Head coach: Noel Orcullo	Adamson Lady Falcons 7 Louie Romero (c); 2 Cae Lazo; 4 Angelica Alcantara; 6 May Ann Nuique; 8 Antoinette Adolfo; 9 Kate Santiago; 10 Karen Verdeflor; 11 Rizza Cruz; 12 Trisha Gayle Tubu; 13 Aprylle Tagsip; 15 Ayesha Juegos; 16 Maria Rochel Lalongisip; 17 Lucille Almonte; 18 Lorene Grace Toring Head coach: Jerry Yee

== See also ==
- 2022 V-League Collegiate Challenge
