= Philippine University Games =

Collegiate sports competition in the Philippines

- Abbreviation: UNIGAMES
- Frequency: Annually
- Inaugurated: 1996
- Most recent: 2025 in Bacolod; Talisay; Silay
- Next event: 2026
- President: Roger A. Banzuela
- Headquarters: Bacolod, Philippines

Philippine University Games
- Abbreviation: UNIGAMES
- Formation: 1996
- Legal status: Association
- Location: Bacolod
- Region served: Philippines
- Members: Open
- President: Roger A. Banzuela
- Main organ: UNIGAMES, Inc.

The Philippine University Games, abbreviated as the UNIGAMES, is a national collegiate sports competition in the Philippines organized by UNIGAMES, Incorporated. Founded in 1996, it was first held at the University of St. La Salle, the founding host, in Bacolod, Philippines.

== History ==
Founded in 1996 by then University of St. La Salle president Br. Rolando Dizon, FSC, and Visayas-based volleyball coach (and later president of the Philippine Amateur Volleyball Association) Roger Banzuela, the first UNIGAMES was held in Bacolod City with volleyball as the games's sole competition.

In its early days, UNIGAMES hosted numerous editions in the western side of Visayas with both Bacolod and Dumaguete alternating hosting rights, until 2003 with its first UNIGAMES outside Visayas in the city of Dasmariñas, Cavite in the Luzon area. Since then, UNIGAMES have been held in cities on the western side of Visayas, even holding a few editions in Iloilo City and Roxas City. Roxas City created a first for the UNIGAMES as the Colegio de la Purisima Concepcion was the first college to host the games, a deviation from the usual selection of a local university. The games were interrupted between 2020 and 2023 due to the coronavirus disease pandemic, until 2024 when the city of Dipolog held its first UNIGAMES on the island of Mindanao marking the resumption of the games.

== Sports ==
The UNIGAMES is composed of fourteen (14) sports disciplines namely athletics, badminton, basketball, football, chess, karatedo, lawn tennis, sepak takraw, swimming, table tennis, taekwondo, volleyball, and beach volleyball.

In the 2010 UNIGAMES held in Silliman University, Dumaguete, archery was also introduced.

- Archery
- Athletics
- Badminton
- Basketball
- Chess
- Football
- Karate
- Sepak takraw
- Softball
- Swimming
- Table tennis
- Taekwondo
- Tennis
- Volleyball
- Beach volleyball

== Editions ==
Edition	Year	Host Locality	Host Institution	Ref/Notes
1st	1996	Bacolod	University of St. La Salle	
2nd	1997	Bacolod	University of St. La Salle	
3rd	1998	Bacolod	University of St. La Salle	
4th	1999	Bacolod	University of St. La Salle	
5th	2000	Dumaguete	Foundation University	
6th	2001	Bacolod	University of St. La Salle	
7th	2002	Dumaguete	Foundation University	
8th	2003	Dasmariñas	De La Salle University – Dasmariñas	
9th	2004	Bacolod	University of St. La Salle	
10th	2005	Bacolod	University of St. La Salle	
11th	2006	Bacolod	University of St. La Salle	
12th	2007	Bacolod	University of St. La Salle	
13th	2008	Dumaguete	Foundation University	
14th	2009	Iloilo City	Central Philippine University	
15th	2010	Dumaguete	Silliman University	
16th	2011	Roxas City	Colegio de la Purisima Concepcion	
17th	2012	Bacolod	University of St. La Salle	
18th	2013	Bacolod	University of St. La Salle	
19th	2014	Iloilo City	University of San Agustin	
20th	2015	Bacolod	University of St. La Salle	
21st	2016	Dumaguete	Foundation University	
22nd	2017	Dumaguete	Foundation University	
23rd	2018	Dumaguete	Foundation University	
24th	2019	Iloilo City	University of San Agustin	
	2020-2023	Cancelled due to the coronavirus pandemic.		
25th	2024	Dipolog	Jose Rizal Memorial State University	
26th	2025	Bacolod; Silay Talisay	Various	
27th	2026	Kalibo Aklan	Various	

== List of hosts ==
By city/municipality
Host City/Municipality	Event Hosted
Bacolod	13
Dumaguete	8
Iloilo City	3
Dasmariñas	1
Roxas City	1
Dipolog	1
Silay	1
Talisay	1

By province
Host Province	Event Hosted
Negros Occidental (NIR)	15
Negros Oriental (NIR)	8
Iloilo (R-6)	3
Cavite (R-4A)	1
Zamboanga del Norte (R-9)	1

By region
Host Region	Event Hosted
Negros Island Region (NIR)	23
Western Visayas (R-6)	3
Calabarzon (R-4A)	1
Zamboanga Peninsula (R-9)	1

By inter-island
Host Inter-Island	Event Hosted
Luzon (NCR)	1
Visayas^{a}	26
Mindanao	1

== 2015 UNIGAMES Bacolod ==
The 20th edition of the Unigames was hosted by University of St. La Salle, Bacolod City. from October 24–30. 40 colleges and universities from Luzon, Visayas and Mindanao participated in the 13 sporting disciplines of the games.

These were the winners of the recently concluded games.

Sport	Champion
Men's Athletics	Far Eastern University
Women's Athletics	Far Eastern University
Men's Badminton	College of Saint Benilde
Men's Basketball	College of Saint Benilde
Men's Chess	Far Eastern University
Women's Chess	University of Mindanao
Men's Football	University of the Philippines-Diliman
Women's Football	De La Salle University
Men's Karatedo	Holy Angel University
Women's Karatedo	Xavier University
Men's Lawn Tennis	College of Saint Benilde
Women's Lawn Tennis	College of Saint Benilde
Sepak Takraw	Rizal Technological University
Men's Taekwondo	College of Saint Benilde
Women's Taekwondo	College of Saint Benilde
Table Tennis	San Beda College
Men's Volleyball	De La Salle University
Women's Volleyball	Far Eastern University
Men's Beach Volleyball	Southwestern University
Women's Beach Volleyball	Southwestern University
