= 2025 AVC Women's Volleyball Nations Cup squads =

This article shows the squads of all participating teams for the 2025 AVC Women's Volleyball Nations Cup in Hanoi, Vietnam.

== Pool A ==
=== Australia ===
The roster was announced on 31 May 2025.

Head coach: Russell Borgeaud

- 2 Emily Heintzelman OH
- 3 Mikaela Stevens S
- 5 Jaiha Birkett MB
- 7 Alexia Zammit S
- 8 Allysha Sims L
- 12 Lauren Cox MB
- 15 Kayla Cantrill OH
- 16 Anni Tang MB
- 20 Cameron Zajer OH
- 21 Sarah Burton L
- 23 Ella Schabort OH
- 27 Jesse Mann OH
- 29 Chelsea Cocks MB
- 31 Lana Hollway MB

=== Chinese Taipei ===
The roster was announced on 31 May 2025.

Head coach: Teng Yen-min

- 1 Lin Liang-tai OH
- 4 Chen Li-jung S
- 6 Lin Chi-jung L
- 7 Tsai Yu-chun OH
- 9 Kan Ko-hui MB
- 10 Hsu Wan-yun OH
- 11 Yeh Yu-wen MB
- 12 Liao Yi-jen S
- 13 Chen Chieh OP
- 16 Hu Xiao-pei MB
- 17 Liu Shuang-ling OH
- 18 Qiu Shi-qing L
- 20 Huang Ching-hsuan OP
- 21 Chang Yi-chi OP

=== Hong Kong ===
The roster was announced on 31 May 2025.

Head coach: Kwok Kin Chuen

- 1 Cheung Hiu Nok L
- 3 Fung Tsz Yan S
- 5 Hau Kai Wai S
- 7 Lee Wing Tung OH
- 8 Chim Wing Lam OH
- 9 Shirui Shirley Yu OH
- 11 Pang Wing Nam L
- 12 Pang Wing Lam OH
- 14 Shum Lam OP
- 15 Yu Ying Chi OH
- 17 Fong Ka Yi MB
- 18 Chow Wing Jing MB
- 21 Leung Nga Yee OP
- 30 Yim Wing Ni MB

=== India ===
The roster was announced on 31 May 2025.

Head coach: Nilesh Matte

- 2 Shivapriya Govind L
- 3 Abitha Anilkumar MB
- 4 Shaalini Saravanan OH
- 5 Ezhilmathi Dhanam Palanivel OH
- 7 Shilpa Rajendran Nair Sindhu MB
- 8 Radhakrishnan Anagha OP
- 10 Ayushi Bhandari MB
- 11 Kavita Suthar OH
- 12 Anna Mathew MB
- 13 Anusree Kambrath Poyili OH
- 14 Devika Devarajan S
- 15 Amitha Keekoth S
- 16 Ananya Sree Pullari MB
- 18 Ananya Das L

=== Vietnam ===
The roster was announced on 31 May 2025.

Head coach: Nguyễn Tuấn Kiệt

- 3 Trần Thị Thanh Thúy OH
- 6 Lưu Thị Ly Ly L
- 8 Lê Thanh Thúy MB
- 10 Nguyễn Thị Bích Tuyền OP
- 11 Hoàng Thị Kiều Trinh OP
- 12 Nguyễn Khánh Đang L
- 14 Võ Thị Kim Thoa S
- 15 Nguyễn Thị Trinh MB
- 16 Vi Thị Như Quỳnh OH
- 17 Nguyễn Thị Phương OH
- 18 Phạm Thị Hiền MB
- 19 Đoàn Thị Lâm Oanh S
- 20 Nguyễn Thị Uyên OH
- 25 Trần Thị Bích Thủy MB

== Pool B ==
=== Indonesia ===
The roster was announced on 31 May 2025.

Head coach: Octavian Octavian

- 4 Myrasuci Indriani OH
- 5 Eris Septia Wulandari OH
- 7 Afifah Syahes MB
- 11 Ersandrina Devega OP
- 12 Ajeng Viona Adelea OP
- 15 Yolla Yuliana MB
- 16 Dinda Syifa Ammelia MB
- 17 Tasya Aprilia Putri L
- 18 Rika Dwi Latri MB
- 19 Tisya Amallya Putri S
- 20 Shella Bernadetha Onnan MB
- 24 Arneta Putri Amelian S
- 55 Mediol Stiovanny Yoku OH
- 88 Putri Nur Hidayanti Agustin OH

=== Iran ===
The roster was announced on 31 May 2025.

Head coach: (South Korea) Lee Do-hee

- 1 Maryam Ghazirad L
- 2 Fatemeh Manzouri OH
- 3 Zahra Salehi MB
- 7 Shaghayegh Hassankhani OH
- 9 Reyhaneh Karimi MB
- 10 Zahra Karimi MB
- 13 Negin Shirtari S
- 15 Fatemeh Khalili OH
- 16 Zahra Moghani S
- 18 Elaheh Poursaleh OH
- 22 Sepinood Dastbarjan OP
- 77 Masoumeh Ghadami OH
- 88 Kimia Kiani L
- 99 Ghazaleh Boustan S

=== Kazakhstan ===
The roster was announced on 31 May 2025.

Head coach: (Russia) Rishat Gilyazutdinov

- 1 Perizat Nurbergenova OH
- 2 Sana Anarkulova OH
- 3 Balaiym Koilybayeva MB
- 6 Nailya Nigmatulina S
- 7 Yuliya Yakimova MB
- 8 Ayanat Aidarbekova MB
- 11 Margarita Belchenko OH
- 16 Tatyana Nikitina OP
- 17 Dinara Razakberlina OP
- 18 Sanya Balagazinova MB
- 19 Kamilla Sultanbek OH
- 20 Rayana Dyussenbayeva S
- 21 Tomiris Sagimbayeva L
- 22 Sabira Bekisheva L

=== Mongolia ===
The roster was announced on 31 May 2025.

Head coach: Kherlen Batdorj

- 1 Enkhzul Galtmandal MB
- 2 Amarbayasgalan Batbold MB
- 3 Khandsuren Gantogtokh MB
- 4 Enkhnaran Ganbold OH
- 6 Erdene-Enkh Otgonsuren L
- 7 Narangua Sumiyabeis OP
- 8 Namuun Davaadorj S
- 9 Anudari Erdenesukh OH
- 11 Enkhkhuslen Purevsuren MB
- 12 Anujin Dayandorj L
- 15 Ninjbolor Battur OH
- 16 Sanchirmaa Mongontsooj S
- 17 Saruulgerel Ganbat OP
- 44 Nomin Naranbayar OH

=== New Zealand ===
The roster was announced on 31 May 2025.

Head coach: Adam Watson

- 1 Anaya Cole L
- 2 Petra Manderson OP
- 3 Italia Tiatia OH
- 4 Charlie Vail OP
- 5 Chloe Kemble OH
- 7 Emma Mason OH
- 8 Sophie Young S
- 9 Holly Chandler OP
- 10 Katie Adamson MB
- 11 Hayley Flatz L
- 12 Brieana Booth S
- 13 Elizabeth Hanna MB
- 14 Kyla Te Wano Greensill OP
- 23 Jahmal Beckmannflay MB

=== Philippines ===
The roster was announced on 31 May 2025.

Head coach: (Brazil) Jorge Edson

- 1 Shaina Nitura OH
- 2 Mereophe Sharma MB
- 3 Vanie Gandler OH
- 4 Bella Belen OH
- 5 Dawn Macandili-Catindig L
- 6 Julia Coronel S
- 8 Eya Laure OH
- 9 Jen Nierva L
- 10 Clarisse Loresco MB
- 11 Jia de Guzman S
- 12 Angel Canino OH
- 13 Dell Palomata MB
- 14 Alyssa Solomon OP
- 17 Theas Gagate MB
