= Kim Young-mi =

Kim Young-mi may refer to:

- Youngmi Kim (born 1954), South Korean soprano
- Kim Young-mi (sport shooter) (born 1960), South Korean sport shooter
- Kim Yeong-mi (born 1991), South Korean curler
- Kim Young-mi (table tennis), South Korean table tennis international
- Kim Young-mi (Squid Game), a Squid Game character

== See also ==
- Kim Yong-mi (disambiguation)
