= Young-mi =

- Hangul: 영미
- RR: Yeongmi
- MR: Yŏngmi

Young-mi, also spelled Yong-mi or Yeong-mi, is a Korean given name. It was the tenth-most popular name for baby girls born in South Korea in 1960.

== People ==
People with this name include:

- Youngmi Kim (born 1954), South Korean soprano singer
- Kim Young-mi (sport shooter) (born 1960), South Korean sport shooter
- Choi Young-mi (born 1961), South Korean poet
- Kolleen Park (Korean name Park Youngmi, born 1967), American musician and actress active in the South Korean entertainment industry
- Hong Yeong-mi (born 1968), South Korean cyclist
- Ahn Young-mi (born 1983), South Korean comedian
- Kang Young-mi (born 1985), South Korean fencer
- Kim Yong-mi (synchronized swimmer) (born 1989), North Korean synchronized swimmer
- Kim Yeong-mi (born 1991), South Korean curler
- Kim Yong-mi (volleyball) (born 1992), North Korean volleyball player
- Youngmi Mayer, American comedian

== See also ==
- List of Korean given names
