= Aishath =

Aishath is a given name. Notable people with the name include:

- Aishath Ali, Maldivian politician
- Aishath Azeema, Maldivian diplomat
- Aishath Gulfa (born 1982), Maldivian actress
- Aishath Himna Hassan (born 2002), Maldivian athlete
- Aishath Inaya (born 1968), Maldivian singer
- Aishath Nahula (born 1982), Maldivian politician
- Aishath Nazima (born 1980), Maldivian athlete
- Aishath Maain Rasheed (born 1992), Maldivian singer
- Aishath Rasheedha (died 2019), Maldivian actress and businessperson
- Aishath Reesha (born 1989), Maldivian runner
- Aishath Rishmy (born 1985), Maldivian actress and director
- Aishath Sajina (born 1997), Maldivian swimmer
- Aishath Sausan (born 1988), Maldivian swimmer
- Aishath Shiranee (born 1975), Maldivian actress
