= India national volleyball team =

India national volleyball team may refer to:

- India men's national volleyball team
- India women's national volleyball team
