= Volleyball at the 2010 Asian Games – Women's tournament =

Women at the 2010 Asian Games
- Venue: Guangwai Gymnasium; Guangzhou Gymnasium
- Date: 18–27 November 2010
- Competitors: 130 from 11 nations

Medalists
gold medal	China
silver medal	South Korea
bronze medal	Kazakhstan

The 2010 Women's Asian Games Volleyball Tournament was the 13th edition of the event, organized by the Asian governing body, the AVC. It was held in Guangzhou, China from November 18 to November 27, 2010. All games were staged at the Guangwai Gymnasium but medal matches were held at the Guangzhou Gymnasium.

== Squads ==
China	Chinese Taipei	India	Japan
Wang Yimei; Zhang Lei; Yang Jie; Shen Jingsi; Zhou Suhong; Zhang Xian; Wei Qiuyue; Li Juan; Xu Yunli; Xue Ming; Chen Liyi; Ma Yunwen	Teng Yen-min; Huang Szu-chi; Wu Ko-jou; Hsieh Yi-ting; Tsai Yin-feng; Liao Wan-ju; Chen Wan-ting; Wu Shu-fen; Yang Meng-hua; Wen I-tzu; Yen Pei-ling; Yang Ya-chu	Priyanka Khedkar; Princy Joseph; P. J. Jomol; Kattuparambath Reshma; Soumya Vengadan; Shibi Joseph; Soorya Thottangal; Tiji Raju; Priyanka Bora; Terin Antony; Minimol Abraham; Aswani Kiran	Mariko Mori; Masami Yokoyama; Mayumi Kosuge; Hiroko Hakuta; Yuki Nishiyama; Minami Yoshida; Sakura Numata; Shoko Omura; Saki Minemura; Miku Izuoka; Rika Nomoto; Misato Kimura
Kazakhstan	Maldives	Mongolia	North Korea
Natalya Zhukova; Sana Jarlagassova; Olga Nassedkina; Olessya Arslanova; Korinna Ishimtseva; Irina Lukomskaya; Yelena Ezau; Marina Storozhenko; Yuliya Kutsko; Lyudmila Anarbayeva; Inna Matveyeva; Olga Drobyshevskaya	Mariyam Haleem; Nasra Ibrahim; Aishath Nazima; Muna Muneer; Aishath Saffa; Haleemath Sama; Leela Hamid; Suhana Mohamed; Hawwa Rashida; Aminath Zeena; Agila Hamid; Fathmath Aroosha	Sükhbatyn Otgonbyamba; Altangereliin Pürevsüren; Altangereliin Naranchimeg; Pürevjavyn Buyanjargal; Gantsetsegiin Enkhsaikhan; Lkhagvasürengiin Otgontsetseg; Chinboldyn Khaliun; Ganboldyn Tsetsegjargal; Erkhembayaryn Mönkh-Üils; Amgalanbazaryn Uranchimeg; Bayaagiin Sünjidmaa; Gansükhiin Ölziidelger	Kim Un-jong; Kim Yong-mi; Jong Jin-sim; Han Ok-sim; Min Ok-ju; Choe Ryon; Kim Kyong-suk; Ri Hyon-suk; Nam Mi-hyang; Kim Hye-ok; Kim Ok-hui; Ri Sun-jong
South Korea	Tajikistan	Thailand	
Oh Ji-young; Kim Sa-nee; Nam Jie-youn; Yim Myung-ok; Kim Yeon-koung; Han Yoo-mi; Han Song-yi; Jung Dae-young; Hwang Youn-joo; Kim Se-young; Lee So-ra; Yang Hyo-jin	Shahnoza Nazirova; Umeda Juraeva; Dilfuza Dadojonova; Safina Zoalshoeva; Sukhanoro Abdulloeva; Mushtari Jonalishoeva; Asliya Gulomrasulova; Ganjina Imronshoeva; Malika Muzafarova; Nigina Muborakshoeva	Piyanut Pannoy; Rasamee Supamool; Pleumjit Thinkaow; Onuma Sittirak; Utaiwan Kaensing; Wilavan Apinyapong; Amporn Hyapha; Kamonporn Sukmak; Nootsara Tomkom; Sutadta Chuewulim; Malika Kanthong; Em-orn Phanusit	

== Results ==
All times are China Standard Time (UTC+08:00)

=== Preliminary ===
==== Group A ====
Pos	Team	Pld	W	L	Pts	SPW	SPL	SPR	SW	SL	SR	Qualification
1	China	4	4	0	8	360	225	1.600	12	3	4.000	Quarterfinals
2	South Korea	4	3	1	7	320	214	1.495	11	3	3.667	Quarterfinals
3	Thailand	4	2	2	6	295	232	1.272	7	6	1.167	Quarterfinals
4	Mongolia	4	1	3	5	175	251	0.697	3	9	0.333	Quarterfinals
5	Tajikistan	4	0	4	4	72	300	0.240	0	12	0.000	Placement 9–11

Source: Results

Date	Time	Venue		Score		Set 1	Set 2	Set 3	Set 4	Set 5	Total	Report
18 Nov	18:00	G-wai	Thailand	0–3	South Korea	20–25	19–25	17–25			56–75	Report
18 Nov	20:00	G-wai	Tajikistan	0–3	China	5–25	4–25	2–25			11–75	Report
19 Nov	12:00	G-wai	Mongolia	0–3	Thailand	6–25	9–25	22–25			37–75	Report
19 Nov	18:00	G-wai	South Korea	3–0	Tajikistan	25–4	25–7	25–3			75–14	Report
20 Nov	18:00	G-wai	Tajikistan	0–3	Mongolia	9–25	6–25	11–25			26–75	Report
20 Nov	20:00	G-wai	China	3–2	South Korea	23–25	23–25	25–22	25–17	15–6	111–95	Report
21 Nov	18:00	G-wai	Thailand	3–0	Tajikistan	25–7	25–8	25–6			75–21	Report
21 Nov	20:00	G-wai	Mongolia	0–3	China	9–25	13–25	8–25			30–75	Report
22 Nov	12:00	G-wai	South Korea	3–0	Mongolia	25–7	25–12	25–14			75–33	Report
22 Nov	20:00	G-wai	China	3–1	Thailand	25–23	25–21	24–26	25–19		99–89	Report

==== Group B ====
Pos	Team	Pld	W	L	Pts	SPW	SPL	SPR	SW	SL	SR	Qualification
1	Kazakhstan	5	5	0	10	443	317	1.397	15	4	3.750	Quarterfinals
2	North Korea	5	4	1	9	431	316	1.364	14	5	2.800	Quarterfinals
3	Japan	5	3	2	8	395	344	1.148	10	8	1.250	Quarterfinals
4	Chinese Taipei	5	2	3	7	429	365	1.175	11	9	1.222	Quarterfinals
5	India	5	1	4	6	260	319	0.815	3	12	0.250	Placement 9–11
6	Maldives	5	0	5	5	78	375	0.208	0	15	0.000	Placement 9–11

Source: Results

Date	Time	Venue		Score		Set 1	Set 2	Set 3	Set 4	Set 5	Total	Report
18 Nov	12:00	G-wai	Kazakhstan	3–0	Maldives	25–7	25–6	25–3			75–16	Report
18 Nov	14:00	G-wai	Chinese Taipei	2–3	Japan	25–19	17–25	26–24	17–25	15–17	100–110	Report
18 Nov	16:00	G-wai	North Korea	3–0	India	25–23	25–13	25–20			75–56	Report
19 Nov	14:00	G-wai	Maldives	0–3	India	6–25	7–25	6–25			19–75	Report
19 Nov	16:00	G-wai	Kazakhstan	3–1	Chinese Taipei	25–19	17–25	25–19	25–19		92–82	Report
19 Nov	20:00	G-wai	Japan	0–3	North Korea	21–25	17–25	13–25			51–75	Report
20 Nov	12:00	G-wai	Chinese Taipei	3–0	Maldives	25–4	25–10	25–5			75–19	Report
20 Nov	14:00	G-wai	North Korea	2–3	Kazakhstan	22–25	25–22	25–17	16–25	10–15	98–104	Report
20 Nov	16:00	G-wai	India	0–3	Japan	23–25	16–25	17–25			56–75	Report
21 Nov	12:00	G-wai	Kazakhstan	3–0	India	25–18	25–9	25–10			75–37	Report
21 Nov	14:00	G-wai	Maldives	0–3	Japan	7–25	1–25	8–25			16–75	Report
21 Nov	16:00	G-wai	Chinese Taipei	2–3	North Korea	25–17	28–26	18–25	14–25	12–15	97–108	Report
22 Nov	14:00	G-wai	India	0–3	Chinese Taipei	12–25	12–25	12–25			36–75	Report
22 Nov	16:00	G-wai	Japan	1–3	Kazakhstan	15–25	25–22	23–25	21–25		84–97	Report
22 Nov	18:00	G-wai	North Korea	3–0	Maldives	25–4	25–1	25–3			75–8	Report

=== Placement 9–11 ===
Placement 9–11
24 November
Tajikistan	0
Maldives	3

Placement 9th–10th
25 November
India	3
Maldives	0

==== Semifinals ====
Date	Time	Venue		Score		Set 1	Set 2	Set 3	Set 4	Set 5	Total	Report
24 Nov	12:00	G-wai	Tajikistan	0–3	Maldives	21–25	24–26	18–25			63–76	Report

==== Placement 9th–10th ====
Date	Time	Venue		Score		Set 1	Set 2	Set 3	Set 4	Set 5	Total	Report
25 Nov	12:00	G-wai	India	3–0	Maldives	25–4	25–5	25–7			75–16	Report

=== Final round ===
Quarterfinals
24 November
Kazakhstan	3
Mongolia	0
24 November
South Korea	3
Japan	0
24 November
China	3
Chinese Taipei	0
24 November
North Korea	3
Thailand	2

Semifinals
25 November
Kazakhstan	0
South Korea	3
25 November
China	3
North Korea	0

Gold medal match
27 November
South Korea	2
China	3
Bronze medal match
27 November
Kazakhstan	3
North Korea	0

Placement 5–8
25 November
Mongolia	0
Japan	3
25 November
Chinese Taipei	0
Thailand	3

Placement 5th–6th
27 November
Japan	1
Thailand	3
Placement 7th–8th
27 November
Mongolia	0
Chinese Taipei	3

==== Quarterfinals ====
Date	Time	Venue		Score		Set 1	Set 2	Set 3	Set 4	Set 5	Total	Report
24 Nov	14:00	G-wai	North Korea	3–2	Thailand	25–23	17–25	27–25	7–25	15–12	91–110	Report
24 Nov	16:00	G-wai	South Korea	3–0	Japan	25–16	25–22	25–15			75–53	Report
24 Nov	18:00	G-wai	Kazakhstan	3–0	Mongolia	25–18	25–8	25–12			75–38	Report
24 Nov	20:00	G-wai	China	3–0	Chinese Taipei	25–10	25–18	25–19			75–47	Report

==== Placement 5–8 ====
Date	Time	Venue		Score		Set 1	Set 2	Set 3	Set 4	Set 5	Total	Report
25 Nov	14:00	G-wai	Mongolia	0–3	Japan	15–25	6–25	11–25			32–75	Report
25 Nov	16:00	G-wai	Chinese Taipei	0–3	Thailand	13–25	22–25	27–29			62–79	Report

==== Semifinals ====
Date	Time	Venue		Score		Set 1	Set 2	Set 3	Set 4	Set 5	Total	Report
25 Nov	18:00	G-wai	Kazakhstan	0–3	South Korea	15–25	17–25	19–25			51–75	Report
25 Nov	20:00	G-wai	China	3–0	North Korea	25–11	25–20	25–15			75–46	Report

==== Placement 7th–8th ====
Date	Time	Venue		Score		Set 1	Set 2	Set 3	Set 4	Set 5	Total	Report
27 Nov	10:00	G-wai	Mongolia	0–3	Chinese Taipei	18–25	11–25	11–25			40–75	Report

==== Placement 5th–6th ====
Date	Time	Venue		Score		Set 1	Set 2	Set 3	Set 4	Set 5	Total	Report
27 Nov	12:30	G-wai	Japan	1–3	Thailand	12–25	28–26	14–25	26–28		80–104	Report

==== Bronze medal match ====
Date	Time	Venue		Score		Set 1	Set 2	Set 3	Set 4	Set 5	Total	Report
27 Nov	10:00	G-zhou	Kazakhstan	3–0	North Korea	25–21	25–16	25–22			75–59	Report

==== Gold medal match ====
Date	Time	Venue		Score		Set 1	Set 2	Set 3	Set 4	Set 5	Total	Report
27 Nov	14:00	G-zhou	South Korea	2–3	China	25–21	25–22	10–25	17–25	14–16	91–109	Report

== Final standing ==
Rank	Team	Pld	W	L
1st place, gold medalist(s)	China	7	7	0
2nd place, silver medalist(s)	South Korea	7	5	2
3rd place, bronze medalist(s)	Kazakhstan	8	7	1
4	North Korea	8	5	3
5	Thailand	7	4	3
6	Japan	8	4	4
7	Chinese Taipei	8	3	5
8	Mongolia	7	1	6
9	India	6	2	4
10	Maldives	7	1	6
11	Tajikistan	5	0	5
