= Minimol Abraham =

Indian volleyball player (born 1988)

Personal information
- Nationality: India
- Born: 27 March 1988 (age 38); Kerala, India

Volleyball information
- Current club: Indian Railways

National team
2010-present	India

Minimol Abraham, also known as Minomol Abraham (born 27 March 1988), is a former Indian female volleyball player of the India women's national volleyball team. Minimol also plays for the domestic volleyball club Indian Railways in domestic league matches. She is considered one of the finest women volleyball players to have emerged from the state of Kerala along with Aswani Kiran, Poornima and Princy Joseph.

== Early life ==
Abraham was born on 27 March 1998. She is from Kottiyoor, Kannur, Kerala. She is employed with the Indian Railways and was posted at Shoranur, where she settled down.

== Career ==
She was selected to represent India at the 2010 Asian Games, her maiden Asian Games appearance and was part of the squad which finished 9th in the women's team event. In July 2018, she was appointed as the captain of the Indian national team for the 2018 Asian Games.

In 2012, she was involved in a police case in which she was suspected to have been harassed by three young men who allegedly pushed her down while she was walking and the case was later filed as an accidental case.
