= UAAP Season 82 volleyball tournaments =

Philippine volleyball tournaments

UAAP Season 82
- All For More
Boys' Finals	G1	G2	Wins
FEU–D Baby Tamaraws	1	0	0
NUNS Bullpups	3	3	2
- Duration: November 10–17, 2019
- Arena(s): Filoil Flying V Centre, Blue Eagle Gym
- Finals MVP: Mac Bandola
- Winning coach: Edgar Barroga
- Semifinalists: UE Junior Red Warriors; UST Tiger Cubs
Girls' Finals	G1	G2	Wins
NUNS Lady Bullpups	3	3	2
Adamson Lady Baby Falcons	0	0	0
- Duration: November 10–17, 2019
- Arena(s): Filoil Flying V Centre, Blue Eagle Gym
- Finals MVP: Evangeline Alinsug
- Winning coach: Regine Diego
- Semifinalists: UST Junior Tigresses; Zobel Junior Lady Archers

The UAAP Season 82 volleyball tournaments started on September 4, 2019 with the junior tournaments and on March 3, 2020 for the senior tournaments. The games were played at the Filoil Flying V Centre, Mall of Asia Arena, Smart Araneta Coliseum, PhilSports Arena and the Blue Eagle Gym. The volleyball tournament commissioner is Noreen Go.

== Teams ==
All eight member universities of the UAAP fielded teams in all three divisions.

University	Men's team	Women's team	Boys' team	Girls' Team
Adamson University	Soaring Falcons	Lady Falcons	Baby Falcons	Lady Baby Falcons
Ateneo de Manila University	Blue Eagles	Lady Eagles	Blue Eaglets	Lady Eaglets
De La Salle University	Green Spikers	Lady Spikers	Junior Archers	Junior Lady Archers
Far Eastern University	Tamaraws	Lady Tamaraws	Baby Tamaraws	Lady Baby Tamaraws
National University	Bulldogs	Lady Bulldogs	Bullpups	Lady Bullpups
University of the East	Red Warriors	Lady Warriors	Junior Warriors	Junior Lady Warriors
University of the Philippines Diliman	Fighting Maroons	Fighting Maroons	Junior Maroons	Junior Lady Maroons
University of Santo Tomas	Growling Tigers	Golden Tigresses	Tiger Cubs	Junior Tigresses

=== Coaches ===
University	Men's coach	Women's coach	Boys' coach	Girls' Coach
Adamson University	Domingo Custodio	Lerma Giron	Marvin Ramoso	Rogelio Getigan
Ateneo de Manila University	Timothy Sto. Tomas	Oliver Almadro	John Paul Pareja	No team
De La Salle University	Arnold Laniog	Ramil De Jesus	Michael Carino	Cristina Salak
Far Eastern University	Rey Diaz	George Pascua	Rodrigo Del Rosario	Rodrigo Del Rosario
National University	Dante Alinsunurin	Norman Miguel	Edgar Barroga	Regine Diego
University of the East	Jerome Guhit	Ray Karl Dimaculangan	Raffy Monsuela	Chris Dimaculangan
University of the Philippines Diliman	Rald Ricafort	Godfrey Okumu	Hans Chuacuco	Andy Fiel
University of Santo Tomas	Odjie Mamon	Emilio Reyes	Clarence Esteban	Emilio Reyes

=== Coaching changes ===
Team	Outgoing coach	Manner of departure	Date	Replaced by	Date
NU Lady Bullpups	Raymund Castillo	Fired	January 2, 2019	Regine Diego	January 2, 2019
Adamson Lady Falcons	Rogelio Getigan	Resigned	August 25, 2019	Lerma Giron (interim)	August 25, 2019

== Men's tournament ==
=== Team line-up ===
Adamson Soaring Falcons
No.	Name	Position
1	ALEGRE, Grant Carlo	
2	PACQUING, Ned Calvert	
3	MIRANDA, Lheo (c)	OH
4	BELLO, Royce	MB
5	MIRADOR, Aaron	
6	JIMENEZ, Carlo	S
7	GUDOY, Jadewin	OP
8	VIRAY, Adrian	OH
9	VALDEZ, Jesus	L
10	CASAS, Francis	
11	NUGUID, John Philip	OP
12	DELA CRUZ, Archie	
13	LABANG, George Jr.	OP
14	ALICANDO, Geffrey	MB
	CUSTODIO, Domingo	HC

Ateneo Blue Eagles
No.	Name	Position
1	MAGADIA, Lawrence Gil (c)	S
2	AGUILAR, Karl Michael	OP
3	MEDALLA, Ron Adrian	OH
4	GOPIO, Jettlee	
6	MORADO, Ariel Jr.	S
8	LIGOT, Luis Alonzo Martin	OP
10	TRINIDAD, Paulo Lorenzo	L
11	LLENOS, Canciano	
12	NJIGHA, Chumason	MB
13	SUMANGUID, Manuel III	L
14	GO, Emmanuel	
16	GLORIOSO, Gian Carlo	MB
17	CUERVA, Sebastian Enrique	OH
19	LOIZ, Janfrey Mikhail	
	STO. TOMAS, Timothy	HC

De La Salle Green Spikers
No.	Name	Position
1	REYES, Keiffer Arvex	MB
2	MACASPAC, Rafael	L
3	ANIMA, Billie-Jean Henri	OH
5	DELOS REYES, John David	MB
6	SUMALINOG, John Raphael	L
7	RONQUILLO, John Mark	OP
9	MARCO, Wayne Ferdi (c)	S
10	MANALASTAS, Jericho	MB
11	SERRANO, Angel Paul	S
13	INOCENTES, John David	OH
15	JUMANDOS, Ian Kym	OH
16	DE JESUS, Gian Edrei	OP
17	MAGLINAO, Vince Gerard	OH
18	DE JESUS, Jules Carlo	OH
	LANIOG, Arnold	HC

FEU Tamaraws
No.	Name	Position
1	BARRICA, Jeremiah	L
3	SILANG, Kris Cian	S
4	SUAREZ, Owen Jaime	S
6	CALADO, Mark Frederick	OH
7	GARCIA, Jude	OP
8	BUGAOAN, John Paul (c)	MB
9	LORENZO, Vince Patrick	L
10	FERRER, Mike Genesis	
11	PADON, Sean Victor	L
12	SALABSAB, John Paul	MB
13	JAVELONA, Jose Magdaleno	OH
14	BUGAOAN, Martin	OP
15	QUIEL, Peter John	MB
16	ABUNAWAN, Jefferson	
	DIAZ, Reynaldo Jr.	HC

NU Bulldogs
No.	Name	Position
1	ALMENDRAS, Angelo Nicolas	OH
2	ANCHETA, John Paulo	S
5	PONTI, Krisvan	MB
6	MONDERO, Banjo	OP
7	ARINGO, Leo Jr.	
9	NATIVIDAD, James Martin (c)	OH
10	BUEN, Clarence	
11	CAMPOSANO, Edward	OP
13	RETAMAR, Ave Joshua	S
14	DAYMIL, Berhashidin	
15	MARCOS, Ricky	L
16	OCAMPO, Jomar	
18	LUMANLAN, Louis Emmanuel	
19	MACLANG, Marco Ely	L
	ALINSUNURIN, Dante	HC

UE Red Warriors
No.	Name	Position
1	ABALON, Al-John (c)	MB
2	IMPERIAL, Ralph Ryan	S
3	BONOAN, Bryan Ross	
4	YNION, Kirk Eugene	OH
5	REYES, Jose Mari	
6	CULABAT, Kenneth Roi	OH
7	ABANGAN, Jovel	OP
8	LANAZA, Jann Vincent	
9	SOLIS, Aldwin	L
11	JOSAFAT, Lloyd	MB
13	ESGUERRA, Kelvyn John	
14	CACAYAN, Mori	
15	ANDAYA, John Michael	OP
18	MEDINA, John Lester	L
	GUHIT, Jerome	HC

UP Fighting Maroons
No.	Name	Position
1	BALDELOVAR, Jerahmeel	S
2	GAMBAN, Louis Gaspar	OH
3	CONSUELO, Nicolo Brylle	
4	CASTILLO, John Mark Joshua	MB
5	NICOLAS, Daniel	OP
6	VELASQUEZ, Redhen Jade	
7	NASOL, John Miguel	L
10	PEDROSA, Jerremy	
11	MEMBREVE, John Vincent	L
12	MILLETE, John Mark (c)	OP
13	IJIRAN, Ruskin Joss	
15	MALABANAN, Jaivee	OP
16	CUEVAS, Juan Carlos	S
18	LOMIBAO, John Christoher	OH
	RICAFORT, Rald	HC

UST Growling Tigers
No.	Name	Position
1	SAWAL, Lester Kim	L
2	VALENZUELA, Vyxen Vaughn	
3	MAGPAYO, Charlee	MB
4	YU, Joshua	
5	CRUZ, Lorence	S
6	CASILLAN, Aldous Darcy	S
8	SEÑORON, Jhun Lorenz	OH
9	FLOR, Rainier	
10	MEDINA, Manuel Andrei (c)	MB
11	UMANDAL, Joshua	OP
12	CORDA, Hernel Gem	S
13	MENDIOLLA, Jelex Jay	L
14	ORTIZ, Emilio Paul	MB
15	REDIDO, Genesis Allan	OH
	MAMON, Odjie	HC

Legend
S	Setter
MB	Middle Blocker
OH	Outside Hitter
OP	Opposite Hitter
L	Libero
DS	Defensive Specialist
(c)	Team Captain
HC	Head coach

=== Elimination round ===
==== Team standings ====
Pos	Team	Pld	W	L	Pts	SW	SL	SR	SPW	SPL	SPR
1	NU Bulldogs	2	2	0	6	6	1	6.000	177	145	1.221
2	FEU Tamaraws	2	2	0	5	6	2	3.000	184	161	1.143
3	UP Fighting Maroons	2	1	1	3	4	3	1.333	157	164	0.957
4	Ateneo Blue Eagles (H)	2	1	1	3	3	3	1.000	140	139	1.007
5	UE Red Warriors	2	1	1	3	3	4	0.750	156	157	0.994
6	De La Salle Green Archers	1	0	1	0	0	3	0.000	64	77	0.831
7	Adamson Soaring Falcons	1	0	1	0	0	3	0.000	51	75	0.680
8	UST Growling Tigers	2	0	2	1	3	6	0.500	202	211	0.957

Updated to match(es) played on March 8, 2020. Source: ABS-CBN Sports
Rules for classification: 1) number of wins; 2) if tied for #2 or #4, one-game playoff; 3) match points; 4) sets ratio; 5) points ratio; 6) head-to-head record
(H) Host

==== Match-up results ====
	Round 1							Round 2						
Team ╲ Game	1	2	3	4	5	6	7	8	9	10	11	12	13	14
Adamson	NU school colors	FEU school colors	UP school colors	La Salle school colors	Ateneo school colors	UST school colors	UE school colors							
Ateneo	UP school colors	La Salle school colors	UE school colors	FEU school colors	NU school colors	Adamson school colors	UST school colors							
La Salle	Ateneo school colors	UP school colors	UST school colors	Adamson school colors	UE school colors	NU school colors	FEU school colors							
FEU	UE school colors	UST school colors	Adamson school colors	Ateneo school colors	NU school colors	UP school colors	La Salle school colors							
NU	UST school colors	Adamson school colors	UE school colors	Ateneo school colors	FEU school colors	La Salle school colors	UP school colors							
UE	FEU school colors	UP school colors	Ateneo school colors	NU school colors	UST school colors	La Salle school colors	Adamson school colors							
UP	Ateneo school colors	UE school colors	La Salle school colors	Adamson school colors	UST school colors	FEU school colors	NU school colors							
UST	NU school colors	FEU school colors	La Salle school colors	UE school colors	UP school colors	Adamson school colors	Ateneo school colors							

= Win; = Loss; = Match cancelled

==== Game results ====
Results on top and to the right of the dashes are for first-round games; those to the bottom and to the left of it are second-round games.

Teams	AdU	AdMU	DLSU	FEU	NU	UE	UP	UST
Adamson Soaring Falcons	—	–	–	–	0–3	–	–	–
Ateneo Blue Eagles	–	—	3–0	–	–	–	0–3	–
De La Salle Green Archers	–	–	—	–	–	–	–	––
FEU Tamaraws	–	–	–	—	–	3–0	–	3–2
NU Bulldogs	–	–	–	–	—	–	–	3–1
UE Red Warriors	–	–	–	–	–	—	3–1	–
UP Fighting Maroons	–	–	–	–	–	–	—	–
UST Growling Tigers	–	–	–	–	–	–	–	—

Updated to match(es) played on March 8, 2020. Source: ABS-CBN Sports
Legend: Blue = left column team win; Red = top row team win.

== Women's tournament ==
=== Team line-up ===
Adamson Lady Falcons
No.	Name	Position
1	TORRES, Maveth	OH
2	GENESIS, Trisha Mae	OH
3	BALANG, Princess	L
4	CRUZ, Rizza Andrea	MB
5	ROMERO, Louie (c)	S
6	PINAR, Ceasa Joria	OP
7	MACASLANG, Krich Aesheluoz	MB
8	ADOLFO, Antonette	OH
11	IGAO, Mary Jane	S
14	PONCE, Tonnie Rose	L
15	INFANTE, Hanna Nicole	DS
16	APRECIO, Martina	OH
17	AVE, Gracelchen	OP
18	TORING, Lorene	MB
	GERON, Lerma	HC

Ateneo Lady Eagles
No.	Name	Position
1	RAVENA, Princess Danielle Theris	L
4	SAMONTE, Julianne Marie	MB
5	GANDLER, Vanessa	OH
6	MARAGUINOT, Janel	S
7	CRUZ, Kiara Cyrene	L
8	DELOS REYES, Jeycel Ann	MB
9	GASTON, Pauline Marie Monique (c)	MB
10	TOLENTINO, Katrina Mae	OP
11	RAAGAS, Erika Beatriz	OP
12	NARIT, Joan Decemary	MB
15	MARAGUINOT, Jhoana Louisse	OH
16	LAVITORIA, Jamie	S
17	NISPEROS, Faith Janine Shirley	OH
19	DOROMAL, Roma Mae	L
	ALMADRO, Oliver	HC

De La Salle Lady Spikers
No.	Name	Position
1	BORABO, Alister Gracielle	OH
2	SHARMA, Mereophe Aevangeline	MB
3	GAGATE, Thea Allison	MB
4	CRUZ, Leila Jane	OP
5	JAZARENO, Ylizyeth Justine	L
6	COBB, Michelle Monique	S
8	DELA CRUZ, Jolina	OH
9	CORONEL, Julia Cyrille	S
11	ALBA, Marionne Angelique	S
12	SAGA, Carmel June	L
13	OGUNSANYA, Aduke Christine (c)	MB
15	TIAMZON, Ernestine Grace	OH
16	SOREÑO, Baby Jyne	OP
18	ESPINA, Marite	OH
	DE JESUS, Ramil	HC

FEU Lady Tamaraws
No.	Name	Position
1	PEROLINO, Zenneth Irene	MB
2	EBON, Lycha	OP
4	FERNANDEZ, Jovelyn	OH
5	DUREMDES, Ria Beatriz Glenell	L
6	AGUDO, Ivanna Marie	OH
7	GALLENTES, Sheena Dae	OH
8	CAYUNA, Maria Angelica (c)	S
9	PASCUA, Jamaica	OH
10	MORA, Mary Martha Louise	S
14	CARANDANG, Czarina Grace	MB
15	GALLO, Gilliane Heinz	L
17	KISEO, Shiela Mae	OH
18	VILLAREAL, Jeanette Virginia	MB
19	DEJITO, Clavel	
	PASCUA, George	HC

NU Lady Bulldogs
No.	Name	Position
1	MUTSHIMA, Margot	OH
2	MABILANGAN, Renee	S
3	ARROYO, Chinnie Pia	OH
4	LANDICHO, Mary Antonette	DS
5	SATO, Risa (c)	MB
8	CHAVEZ, Joni Anne Kamille	S
9	NIERVA, Jennifer	L
10	CLOZA, Elaine	
12	LUCEÑO, Gelina Mae	MB
13	DENURA, Pearl Ann	L
14	EVANGELISTA, Lalaine CJ	
15	PARAN, Audrey Kathryn	OP
16	LACSINA, Ivy	MB
17	ARROYO, Cherique	L
	MIGUEL, Norman	HC

UE Lady Warriors
No.	Name	Position
1	LANA, Janeca	OH
2	CLAVANO, Lhara Mae	S
3	GABARDA, Mariella	MB
4	MENDREZ, Mary Anne (c)	OH
5	DE LEON, Carol	
7	RODRIGUEZ, Seth Marione	MB
8	OLARVE, Zilfa Geline	OP
11	ZETA, Jenina	L
14	LINGAY, Dalrymple	
15	QUIZON, Jhudielle	S
16	MANALO, Rhea	OH
17	SANTOS, Remcel Joyce	MB
18	MANABAT, Mialyn	OP
19	BABOL, Jasckin Mae	L
	DIMACULANGAN, Karl	HC

UP Lady Maroons
No.	Name	Position
1	SOTOMIL, Marianne	S
2	BERNARDO, Lorie Lyn	MB
3	LAYUG, Maristella Genn	MB
5	ATIENZA, Jaila Marie	L
9	RAMOS, Jessma Clarice	MB
10	MOLDE, Maria Lina Isabel	OH
12	ENCARNACION, Jewel Hannah Ysabel	OH
13	DOROG, Justine	L
14	ESLAPOR, Euricka	OH
16	CAILING, Rose Mary	S
18	CARLOS, Diana Mae	OP
19	ROSIER, Roselyn (c)	OP
20	PADILLA, Jeanny	L
24	BUSTRILLO, Stephanie	
	OKUMU, Godfrey	HC

UST Growling Tigresses
No.	Name	Position
1	POLLENTES, Catherine	L
3	JIMENEZ, Ysabel Jamie	OP
4	VIRAY, Caitlyn	MB
5	HERNANDEZ, Imee	MB
7	BARBON, Baby Love	OH
8	LAURE, Ejiya	OP
9	LAURE, Ennajie	OH
10	VICTORIA, Camille	OH
11	BICAR, Alina Joyce (c)	S
12	GALDONES, Kecelyn	MB
14	FRANCISCO, Christine	MB
16	MANGULABNAN, Maria Agatha	S
17	DELERIO, Janel	L
18	TORRES, Janna	MB
	REYES, Emilio Jr.	HC

Legend
S	Setter
MB	Middle Blocker
OH	Outside Hitter
OP	Opposite Hitter
L	Libero
DS	Defensive Specialist
(c)	Team Captain
HC	Head coach

=== Elimination round ===
==== Team standings ====
Pos	Team	Pld	W	L	Pts	SW	SL	SR	SPW	SPL	SPR
1	NU Lady Bulldogs	2	2	0	5	6	2	3.000	183	165	1.109
2	De La Salle Lady Archers	1	1	0	3	3	1	3.000	92	74	1.243
3	UST Growling Tigresses	2	1	1	4	5	3	1.667	181	161	1.124
4	Ateneo Lady Eagles (H)	2	1	1	3	4	3	1.333	149	145	1.028
5	FEU Lady Tamaraws	2	1	1	3	3	3	1.000	129	121	1.066
6	UP Lady Maroons	2	1	1	3	3	4	0.750	146	160	0.913
7	Adamson Lady Falcons	1	0	1	0	0	3	0.000	59	76	0.776
8	UE Lady Warriors	2	0	2	0	1	6	0.167	131	168	0.780

Updated to match(es) played on March 8, 2020. Source: ABS-CBN Sports
Rules for classification: 1) number of wins; 2) if tied for #2 or #4, one-game playoff; 3) match points; 4) sets ratio; 5) points ratio; 6) head-to-head record
(H) Host

==== Match-up results ====
	Round 1							Round 2						
Team ╲ Game	1	2	3	4	5	6	7	8	9	10	11	12	13	14
Adamson	NU school colors	FEU school colors	UP school colors	La Salle school colors	Ateneo school colors	UST school colors	UE school colors							
Ateneo	UP school colors	La Salle school colors	UE school colors	FEU school colors	NU school colors	Adamson school colors	UST school colors							
La Salle	Ateneo school colors	UP school colors	UST school colors	Adamson school colors	UE school colors	NU school colors	FEU school colors							
FEU	UE school colors	UST school colors	Adamson school colors	Ateneo school colors	NU school colors	UP school colors	La Salle school colors							
NU	UST school colors	Adamson school colors	UE school colors	Ateneo school colors	FEU school colors	La Salle school colors	UP school colors							
UE	FEU school colors	UP school colors	Ateneo school colors	NU school colors	UST school colors	La Salle school colors	Adamson school colors							
UP	Ateneo school colors	UE school colors	La Salle school colors	Adamson school colors	UST school colors	FEU school colors	NU school colors							
UST	NU school colors	FEU school colors	La Salle school colors	UE school colors	UP school colors	Adamson school colors	Ateneo school colors							

= Win; = Loss; = Match cancelled

==== Game results ====
Results on top and to the right of the dashes are for first-round games; those to the bottom and to the left of it are second-round games.

Teams	AdU	AdMU	DLSU	FEU	NU	UE	UP	UST
Adamson Lady Falcons	—	–	–	–	0–3	–	–	–
Ateneo Lady Eagles	–	—	1–3	–	–	–	3–0	–
De La Salle Lady Archers	–	–	—	–	–	–	–	–
FEU Lady Tamaraws	–	–	–	—	–	3–0	–	0–3
NU Lady Bulldogs	–	–	–	–	—	–	–	3–2
UE Lady Warriors	–	–	–	–	–	—	1–3	–
UP Lady Maroons	–	–	–	–	–	–	—	–
UST Growling Tigresses	–	–	–	–	–	–	–	—

Updated to match(es) played on March 7, 2020. Source: ABS-CBN Sports
Legend: Blue = left column team win; Red = top row team win.

== Boys' tournament ==
The UAAP Season 82 high school volleyball tournament started on September 4, 2019 at the Paco Arena. Tournament host for the juniors is the Far Eastern University.

=== Team line-up ===
Adamson Baby Falcons
No.	Name	Position
1	AGUILAR, Jude Christian	
2	MARAPOC, Jefferson	
3	GUTIERREZ, Dan Russel	
4	BIHAG, Mark Vin	L
5	MOLINA, Gabriel	
6	NACIONAL, Hanz	
7	GAY, John Eugenio (c)	
9	DE LARA, Mar Angelo	
10	DEL PILAR, Nathaniel	
11	DOMINGO, Ronn Lourenz	S
15	GELOGO, Kylle Andre	
16	NOVILLO, Evander	
17	FRAGATA, Hanz Joel	L
18	LABOG, Vincent Paul	
	RAMOSO, Marvin	HC

Ateneo Blue Eaglets
No.	Name	Position
1	MADAYAG, Miguel Van	
2	MENDOZA, Mikka Alexis	
3	BABST, Evan Andre	
4	SUNDIANG, Javier Joaquin	
5	PACINIO, Amil	
7	SAMANIEGO, Gian Carlo (c)	
10	CALINAWAN, Cleif	S
11	PAJENAGO, Vincent	
12	TANCHINGCO, Joshua Ignacio Luke	
14	SAN JUAN, Giulian Miguel	
15	AGUSTIN, Juan Delfin	L
17	MACARAIG, Dean Angelo	
16	ALMADRO, Andrei John	
18	QUIJANO, Christian David	L
	PAREJA, John Paul	HC

Zobel Junior Archers
No.	Name	Position
1	ENCARNACION, Simon	
2	CRISOSTOMO, Leinuel	L
3	VILLANUEVA, Francis Nino	
4	ROGELIO, Jezreel Danniele	
5	OSTERIA, Gil Bryann	S
6	SEYER, Arnaud Daniel	L
7	ULANDAY, Cerwin	
10	ESPEJO, Andre	
12	LITUANIA, Jhon Exequiel	
14	ARANTON, Enrique Miguel (c)	
15	PELIGORIO, Jose Michael	
16	GUADAMOR, Rojie	
18	UMANDAL, Sherwin Jan	
19	ANQUE, Kient Joshua	
	CARINO, Michael	HC

FEU–D Baby Tamaraws
No.	Name	Position
1	SISON, Rayven Camerone	
2	LIPATA, Angelo	
3	RACAZA, France Lander	
4	DE GUZMAN, Raymond Bryce	L
6	SABADO, Mark Vergel	
7	ALIGAYON, John Steven	L
8	TALISAYAN, Jerold	
9	DICHOSON, Jeek Vincent	
10	CAJOLO, Ranz Wesley	
11	DONGUINES, Justin Dave	
12	ADVINCULA, Emmanuel Izus	
14	MARTINEZ, Benny (c)	S
16	CABATAC, Carl Jonard	
18	CACAO, Ariel	
	DEL ROSARIO, Rodrigo	HC

NUNS Bullpups
No.	Name	Position
1	BUDDIN, Michaelo	
2	FORTUNA, Michael John	
3	TAGANAS, Christian Daniel	
4	BANDOLA, Mac Arvin	
5	REYES, Reymart	
6	GUERRERO, Menard	L
7	BERDIN, Jvon Clint	
8	POQUITA, Diogenes (c)	S
9	QUEZADA, Exequiel Harvey	
10	ORDIALES, Leo	
11	CRUZ, Josh Misael	
12	BELOSTRINO, Clarenz	
16	JALECO, Bryan James	
17	PIJO, Jann Mark	L
	BARROGA, Edgar	HC

UE Junior Red Warriors
No.	Name	Position
1	TORRES, Giles Jeffer	
2	HERBOSA, King Eduard	L
3	MARALIT, Brent Ydward	
5	BABON, Francis Lous (c)	
6	APOLINARIO, John Michael	S
7	ESPENIDA, Joshua	
8	MOLINA, Tristan Harvey	
9	BALEAN, Reyden	
10	HERRERA, Jacob Agassi	
11	MANGAHIS, John Paul	
12	CABALLERO, Marc Joshua	L
13	DEFEO, Axel	
15	REYES, Angelo	
16	BELLO, Joseph Phillip	
	MONSUELA, Raffy	HC

UST Tiger Cubs
No.	Name	Position
1	CAPARAS, Lance Harold	
2	DE LA NOCHE, Jay Rack	
3	CAWALING, Kenneth Miles	
4	VASQUEZ, Roz	
5	DE VEGA, Rey Miguel (c)	
6	NARCISO, Jose Gerardo	
7	SEGUI, Charles Jordan	
9	AVILA, Joshua	
10	BORNEL, Jester Noel	
11	IRAYA, Alexander John	
12	MANGULABNAN, Frederick	S
14	FLORES, Neil Laurence	L
16	COLINARES, Edlyn Paul	
18	PRUDENCIADO, Van Tracy	L
	ESTEBAN, Clarence	HC

Legend
S	Setter
MB	Middle Blocker
OH	Outside Hitter
OP	Opposite Hitter
L	Libero
(c)	Team Captain
HC	Head coach

=== Elimination round ===
==== Team standings ====
Pos	Team	Pld	W	L	Pts	SW	SL	SR	SPW	SPL	SPR	Qualification
1	FEU Baby Tamaraws	12	11	1	31	35	13	2.692	1141	1004	1.136	Twice-to-beat in the semifinals
2	UE Junior Warriors	12	10	2	30	32	11	2.909	1024	864	1.185	Twice-to-beat in the semifinals
3	NSNU Bullpups	12	7	5	21	25	19	1.316	1001	945	1.059	Twice-to-win in the semifinals
4	UST Tiger Cubs	12	6	6	18 (Note: Fourth-seed playoff: UST 3–0)	23	23	1.000	1063	997	1.066	Twice-to-win in the semifinals
5	Adamson Baby Falcons	12	6	6	20	24	20	1.200	1018	994	1.024	Qualified to fourth-seed playoff
6	DLSZ Junior Archers	12	1	11	4 (Note: Head-to-head record: DLSZ 1–1 Ateneo; DLSZ +2)	11	34	0.324	889	1048	0.848	
7	Ateneo Blue Eaglets (H)	12	1	11	2	5	35	0.143	721	980	0.736	

Source: ABS-CBN Sports
Rules for classification: 1) number of wins; 2) if tied for #2 or #4, one-game playoff; 3) match points; 4) sets ratio; 5) points ratio; 6) head-to-head record
(H) Host

==== Match-up results ====
	Round 1						Round 2					
Team ╲ Game	1	2	3	4	5	6	7	8	9	10	11	12
Adamson	FEU school colors	NU school colors	UE school colors	La Salle school colors	Ateneo school colors	UST school colors	NU school colors	Ateneo school colors	UST school colors	FEU school colors	UE school colors	La Salle school colors
Ateneo	UE school colors	UST school colors	FEU school colors	La Salle school colors	NU school colors	Adamson school colors	UST school colors	Adamson school colors	UE school colors	La Salle school colors	FEU school colors	NU school colors
DLSZ	FEU school colors	Ateneo school colors	NU school colors	Adamson school colors	UST school colors	UE school colors	UE school colors	NU school colors	FEU school colors	Ateneo school colors	Adamson school colors	UST school colors
FEU–D	Adamson school colors	La Salle school colors	Ateneo school colors	UST school colors	UE school colors	NU school colors	UST school colors	La Salle school colors	Adamson school colors	Ateneo school colors	NU school colors	UE school colors
NSNU	UST school colors	UE school colors	Adamson school colors	La Salle school colors	Ateneo school colors	FEU school colors	Adamson school colors	La Salle school colors	UE school colors	UST school colors	FEU school colors	Ateneo school colors
UE	Ateneo school colors	NU school colors	Adamson school colors	UST school colors	FEU school colors	La Salle school colors	La Salle school colors	NU school colors	Ateneo school colors	Adamson school colors	UST school colors	FEU school colors
UST	NU school colors	Ateneo school colors	FEU school colors	UE school colors	La Salle school colors	Adamson school colors	Ateneo school colors	FEU school colors	Adamson school colors	NU school colors	UE school colors	La Salle school colors

= Win; = Loss

==== Scores ====
Results on top and to the right of the dashes are for first-round games; those to the bottom and to the left of it are second-round games.

Teams	AdU	AdMU	DLSZ	FEU	NSNU	UE	UST
Adamson Baby Falcons	—	3–0	3–0	1–3	0–3	2–3	0–3
Ateneo Blue Eaglets	0–3	—	3–2	0–3	0–3	0–3	1–3
Zobel Junior Archers	0–3	3–1	—	1–3	1–3	1–3	1–3
FEU–D Baby Tamaraws	3–2	3–0	3–1	—	3–1	3–2	3–2
NUNS Bullpups	1–3	3–0	3–0	3–2	—	0–3	2–3
UE Junior Red Warriors	3–1	3–0	3–0	0–3	3–0	—	3–1
UST Tiger Cubs	1–3	3–0	3–1	0–3	1–3	0–3	—

Source: ABS-CBN Sports
Legend: Blue = left column team win; Red = top row team win.

=== Playoffs ===
Fourth-seed playoff
Adamson	0
UST	3

Semifinals; Top seeds twice-to-beat
1	FEU	1	3
4	UST	3	0
2	UE	0	2
3	NSNU	3	3

Finals; Best-of-three series
1	FEU	1	0
3	NSNU	3	3

=== Fourth-seed playoff ===
- (Sep 28) UST def. Adamson 3–0 • 25–19, 29–27, 25–23
- (Oct 12) Adamson def. UST 3–1 • 23–25, 29–27, 26–24, 25–22

October 30; 10:30 AM (UTC +8:00)	Adamson Baby Falcons	0–3	UST Tiger Cubs	Paco Arena; Attendance: 105; Referees: Mark Santos (NR) and Fernando Velarde (NR)
October 30; 10:30 AM (UTC +8:00)	(17–25, 25–27, 17–25)			Paco Arena; Attendance: 105; Referees: Mark Santos (NR) and Fernando Velarde (NR)
October 30; 10:30 AM (UTC +8:00)	UST advances to the Final Four			Paco Arena; Attendance: 105; Referees: Mark Santos (NR) and Fernando Velarde (NR)

=== Semifinals ===
FEU vs UST FEU with twice-to-beat advantage.
Elimination round results:

- (Sep 14) FEU def. UST 3–2 • 20–25, 29–27, 14–25, 25–23, 15–12
- (Oct 6) FEU def. UST 3–0 • 25–16, 30–28, 25–22

November 3; 10:30 AM (UTC +8:00)	FEU–D Baby Tamaraws	1–3	UST Tiger Cubs	Blue Eagle Gym; Attendance: 155; Referees: Fernando Velarde (NR) and Patrick Castillo (NR)
November 3; 10:30 AM (UTC +8:00)	(20–25, 25–20, 24–26, 22–25)			Blue Eagle Gym; Attendance: 155; Referees: Fernando Velarde (NR) and Patrick Castillo (NR)

November 6 (UTC +8:00)	FEU–D Baby Tamaraws	3–0	UST Tiger Cubs	Paco Arena; Attendance: 505; Referees: Bobby Celso (NR) and Fernando Velarde (NR)
November 6 (UTC +8:00)	(25–22, 25–20, 29–27)			Paco Arena; Attendance: 505; Referees: Bobby Celso (NR) and Fernando Velarde (NR)
November 6 (UTC +8:00)	FEU wins series in two games			Paco Arena; Attendance: 505; Referees: Bobby Celso (NR) and Fernando Velarde (NR)

UE vs NU UE with twice-to-beat advantage.
Elimination round results:

- (Sep 8) UE def. NU 3–0 • 25–20, 25–18, 25–22
- (Oct 9) UE def. NU 3–0 • 25–20, 25–23, 25–17

November 3; 12:00 NN (UTC +8:00)	UE Junior Red Warriors	0–3	NUNS Bullpups	Blue Eagle Gym; Attendance: 195; Referees: Erlindo Eusebio (NR) and Mark Santos (NR)
November 3; 12:00 NN (UTC +8:00)	(19–25, 18–25, 22–25)			Blue Eagle Gym; Attendance: 195; Referees: Erlindo Eusebio (NR) and Mark Santos (NR)

November 6 (UTC +8:00)	UE Junior Red Warriors	2–3	NUNS Bullpups	Paco Arena; Attendance: 540; Referees: Mark Santos (NR) and Mary Joy de Imus (NR)
November 6 (UTC +8:00)	(25–18, 18–25, 23–25, 25–11, 15–17)			Paco Arena; Attendance: 540; Referees: Mark Santos (NR) and Mary Joy de Imus (NR)
November 6 (UTC +8:00)	NU wins series in two games			Paco Arena; Attendance: 540; Referees: Mark Santos (NR) and Mary Joy de Imus (NR)

=== Finals ===
FEU vs NU Best-of-three series.
Elimination round results:

- (Sep 28) FEU def. NU 3–1 • 25–21, 30–28, 23–25, 25–16
- (Oct 23) NU def. FEU 3–2 • 25–17, 19–25, 22–25, 25–22, 15–12

November 10; 10:30 AM (UTC +8:00)	FEU–D Baby Tamaraws	1–3	NUNS Bullpups	Filoil Flying V Centre, San Juan City; Attendance: 1,025; Referees: Roberto Celso (NR) and Fernando Velarde (NR)
November 10; 10:30 AM (UTC +8:00)	(21–25, 25–20, 19–25, 18–25)			Filoil Flying V Centre, San Juan City; Attendance: 1,025; Referees: Roberto Celso (NR) and Fernando Velarde (NR)

November 17; 10:30 AM (UTC +8:00)	FEU–D Baby Tamaraws	0–3	NUNS Bullpups	Filoil Flying V Centre, San Juan City; Attendance: 1,025; Referees: Erlindo Eusebio (NR) and Patrick Castillo (NR)
November 17; 10:30 AM (UTC +8:00)	(20–25, 20–25, 23–25)			Filoil Flying V Centre, San Juan City; Attendance: 1,025; Referees: Erlindo Eusebio (NR) and Patrick Castillo (NR)
November 17; 10:30 AM (UTC +8:00)	NU wins series, 2–0			Filoil Flying V Centre, San Juan City; Attendance: 1,025; Referees: Erlindo Eusebio (NR) and Patrick Castillo (NR)

=== Awards ===
UAAP Season 82 boys' volleyball champions
NUNS Bullpups
Fourth title, second consecutive title

- Most valuable player (Season): Rans Cajolo (FEU–D Baby Tamaraws)
- Most valuable player (Finals): Mac Alvin Bandola (NUNS Bullpups)
- Rookie of the Year: Brent Maralit (UE Junior Red Warriors)
- First Best Outside Spiker: Francis Babon (UE Junior Red Warriors)
- Second Best Outside Spiker: Rey De Vega (UST Tiger Cubs)
- First Best Middle Blocker: Paul Colinares (UST Tiger Cubs)
- Second Best Middle Blocker: Angelo Lipata (FEU–D Baby Tamaraws)
- Best opposite spiker: Rans Cajolo (FEU–D Baby Tamaraws)
- Best setter: Benny Martinez (FEU–D Baby Tamaraws)
- Best libero: Menard Guerrero (NUNS Bullpups)

== Girls' tournament ==
=== Team line-up ===
Adamson Lady Baby Falcons
No.	Name	Position
1	BORROMEO, Mary Grace	
2	CORDORA, Kyla Elvi Daale	
3	VILLEGAS, Jen Kylene	
4	LALONGISIP, Maria (c)	
5	RICABLANCA, Raissa Janel	
6	NUIQUE, May Ann	MB
7	CUENCA, Jaochen Ghail	S
8	DIMACULANGAN, Von Aleina	
9	SANTIAGO, Kate Nhorylle	
11	LOPENA, Julea Dawn	L
12	MANUEL, Juris Anne Clare	L
13	TAGISIP, Aprylle	MB
15	JUEGOS, Ayesha Tara	OP
18	TUBU, Trisha Gayle	OP
	GIRON, Lerma	HC

Zobel Junior Lady Archers
No.	Name	Position
1	ARIONES, Andreanne Jaye	
2	PLAZA, Bianca Mikaela Julia	MB
3	CARANGAN, Kajia (c)	S
5	PETALLO, Gerzel Mary	
6	DE LEON, Lyka Mae	L
7	MAGSOMBOL, Mikaela Alexa	MB
8	DY, Ariya Kaila	OH
9	GAMBOA, Lorien Ysobel	
10	JABONETA, Irah Anika	
11	ALMUETE, Joelle Denise	
12	CANINO, Angel Anne	OH
14	TAN, Rachelle Angelique	L
16	CARBALLO, Ma. Cassandra	S
17	CORTEZ, Riane Ashley	
	Cristina Salak	HC

FEU–D Lady Baby Tamaraws
No.	Name	Position
1	GENTELIZO, Alyssa Lilian	L
2	RUPINTA, Irish Victoria	
3	ALBERTO, Marilla Issabel	S
4	DE GUZMAN, Joann Faeith	
5	GARCIA, Mariella Mae	
6	JUANCO, Alexandra Maxine	L
7	PACIA, Zey Mitzi	
9	MINER, Alexis Ciarra	MB
10	PAPA, Florize Anne	
12	SUAN, Ghanna Mae	
16	DE GUZMAN, Lyann Marie Loise (c)	
17	ARCOLAS, Aira Melchie	
18	MEDINA, Nikka Ann	
19	ASIS, Jean	MB
	DEL ROSARIO, Rodrigo	HC

NUNS Lady Bullpups
No.	Name	Position
4	BELEN, Mhicaela	OH
5	MADERAZO, Marriene Katleen	
6	ALINSUG, Evangeline	OH
7	CAL, Kamille Angelica	S
8	TORING, Sheena Angela	MB
9	JARDIO, Shaira Mae	L
10	ILDEFONSO, Sofia Daniela	
12	SOLOMON, Alyssa Jae	OP
13	LAMINA, Camilla Victoria	S
14	PENA, Maria Taylor	
15	PANGILINAN, Erin May (c)	MB
16	OLANGO, Kianne Louise	OH/OPP
17	JAMILI, Jimy Jean	OH
18	MAAYA, Minerva	MB
	DIEGO, Regine Divinagracia	HC

UE Junior Lady Warriors
No.	Name	Position
1	BORBON, Maria Arabela	
2	ALFEREZ, Terish Anne Mery	
3	ESPIRITU, Romeena	
4	VILLAMOR, Dea Pauline	L
5	PELAGA, Lia Alexa (c)	
6	HERNANDEZ, Lovelee Jane	
7	COLENDRA, Vernicce	
8	GARCIA, Freighanne Seanelle	
9	MINA, Kristine Andrea	
10	DOLORITO, Johna Denise	
11	REYES, Angelica	L
12	MANZANO, Katrina Anne	
16	SUSBILLA, Chris Ann	
18	UMALI, Jessica Danielle	S
	DIMACULANGAN, Ronwald	HC

UPIS Junior Lady Maroons
No.	Name	Position
1	LOPEZ, Beatriz	
2	FERRER, Jeulyanna Simoune	
4	DELA ROSA, Alyssa Claudia	
5	DELA CRUZ, Myskina	
6	CAPISTRANO, Giesha Niccaleigh	L
8	BADONG, Trixie Marie	
9	OMAR, Alliah Bernise	
10	MARARAC, Kyle Alexandra	
13	CONCEPCION, Karla Crizelle	
15	DE GUIA, Frances	S
18	VILLAJUAN, Isabella Marie	
19	MARQUEZ, Alizia Kristine (c)	
20	JACKSON, Mary Angela	
	FIEL, Andy	HC

UST Junior Tigresses
No.	Name	Position
1	PENAFIEL, Renee Lou	OH
2	GARCES, Khaira Reese	
3	PEPITO, Maria Bernadett	L
4	MARANAN, Samantha	
5	CEPADA, Kc	OH
6	BEJAR, Viola	L
9	RAAGAS, Ela Marjanna	
10	SANTOS, Jillian	OH
11	ABBU, Sophia Athena	
12	NARCISO, Tanya Francesca (c)	S
14	JURADO, Regina Grace	OP
15	CORONADO, Mary Joe	
16	CARREON, Jullana Desta	
19	ALTEA, Margaret	
	REYES, Emilio Jr.	HC

Legend
S	Setter
MB	Middle Blocker
OH	Outside Hitter
OP	Opposite Hitter
L	Libero
(c)	Team Captain
HC	Head coach

=== Elimination round ===
==== Team standings ====
Pos	Team	Pld	W	L	Pts	SW	SL	SR	SPW	SPL	SPR	Qualification
1	NUNS Lady Bullpups	12	12	0	36	36	2	18.000	940	608	1.546	Advance to the Finals
2	UST Junior Tigresses	12	10	2	29	30	13	2.308	983	885	1.111	Twice-to-beat in stepladder round 2
3	Adamson Lady Baby Falcons	12	7	5	20	24	20	1.200	958	885	1.082	Stepladder round 1
4	Zobel Junior Lady Archers	12	6	6	18	22	22	1.000	952	988	0.964	Stepladder round 1
5	FEU–D Lady Baby Tamaraws	12	5	7	16	22	22	1.000	941	966	0.974	
6	UE Junior Lady Warriors	12	2	10	7	10	30	0.333	843	954	0.884	
7	UPIS Junior Lady Maroons	12	0	12	0	1	36	0.028	593	924	0.642	

Source: ABS-CBN Sports
Rules for classification: 1) number of wins; 2) if tied for #2 or #4, one-game playoff; 3) match points; 4) sets ratio; 5) points ratio; 6) head-to-head record

==== Match-up results ====
	Round 1						Round 2					
Team ╲ Game	1	2	3	4	5	6	7	8	9	10	11	12
Adamson	FEU school colors	UP school colors	NU school colors	UST school colors	La Salle school colors	UE school colors	La Salle school colors	UE school colors	UST school colors	FEU school colors	NU school colors	UP school colors
DLSZ	UST school colors	FEU school colors	UP school colors	UE school colors	Adamson school colors	NU school colors	Adamson school colors	NU school colors	FEU school colors	UST school colors	UP school colors	UE school colors
FEU–D	Adamson school colors	La Salle school colors	UE school colors	UST school colors	NU school colors	UP school colors	UE school colors	UP school colors	La Salle school colors	Adamson school colors	UST school colors	NU school colors
NSNU	UP school colors	Adamson school colors	UE school colors	FEU school colors	UST school colors	La Salle school colors	UST school colors	La Salle school colors	UP school colors	UE school colors	Adamson school colors	FEU school colors
UE	UP school colors	UST school colors	FEU school colors	NU school colors	La Salle school colors	Adamson school colors	FEU school colors	Adamson school colors	UP school colors	UST school colors	NU school colors	La Salle school colors
UPIS	UE school colors	NU school colors	Adamson school colors	UST school colors	La Salle school colors	FEU school colors	UST school colors	FEU school colors	UE school colors	NU school colors	La Salle school colors	Adamson school colors
UST	La Salle school colors	UE school colors	UP school colors	FEU school colors	Adamson school colors	NU school colors	UP school colors	NU school colors	Adamson school colors	UE school colors	La Salle school colors	FEU school colors

= Win; = Loss

==== Game results ====
Results on top and to the right of the dashes are for first-round games; those to the bottom and to the left of it are second-round games.

Teams	AdU	DLSZ	FEU	NSNU	UE	UPIS	UST
Adamson Lady Baby Falcons	—	2–3	3–2	0–3	3–0	3–0	0–3
Zobel Junior Lady Archers	0–3	—	1–3	0–3	3–1	3–0	1–3
FEU–D Lady Baby Tamaraws	1–3	0–3	—	1–3	3–0	3–0	1–3
NUNS Lady Bullpups	3–0	3–0	3–1	—	3–0	3–0	3–0
UE Junior Lady Warriors	2–3	1–3	0–3	0–3	—	3–0	1–3
UPIS Junior Lady Maroons	0–3	1–3	0–3	0–3	0–3	—	0–3
UST Junior Tigresses	3–1	3–2	3–1	0–3	3–0	3–0	—

Source: ABS-CBN Sports
Legend: Blue = left column team win; Red = top row team win.

=== Playoffs ===
Stepladder round 1 (One-game playoff)
3	Adamson	3
4	DLSZ	0

Stepladder round 2 (No. 2 has twice-to-beat advantage)
2	UST	1	2
3	Adamson	3	3

Finals (Best-of-three series)
1	NSNU	3	3
3	Adamson	0	0

=== Stepladder semifinals ===
==== Stepladder round 1 ====
Adamson vs La Salle One-game playoff.
Elimination round results:

- (Sep 25) La Salle def. Adamson 3–2 • 28–26, 25–21, 22–25, 7–25, 15–8
- (Oct 5) Adamson def. La Salle 3–0 • 25–20, 25–20, 25–23

October 30; 12:00 NN (UTC +8:00)	Adamson Lady Baby Falcons	3–0	Zobel Junior Lady Archers	Paco Arena; Attendance: 150; Referees: Erlindo Eusebio (NR) and Fernando Velarde (NR)
October 30; 12:00 NN (UTC +8:00)	(25–20, 25–21, 25–14)			Paco Arena; Attendance: 150; Referees: Erlindo Eusebio (NR) and Fernando Velarde (NR)
October 30; 12:00 NN (UTC +8:00)	Adamson advances to the stepladder round 2			Paco Arena; Attendance: 150; Referees: Erlindo Eusebio (NR) and Fernando Velarde (NR)

==== Stepladder round 2 ====
UST vs Adamson UST with the twice-to-beat advantage.
Elimination round results:

- (Sep 22) UST def. Adamson 3–0 • 25–20, 25–17, 25–17
- (Oct 13) UST def. Adamson 3–1 • 25–20, 20–25, 25–18, 25–23

November 3; 1:30 PM (UTC +8:00)	UST Junior Tigresses	1–3	Adamson Lady Baby Falcons	Blue Eagle Gym; Attendance: 160; Referees: Patrick Castillo (NR) and Fernando Velarde (NR)
November 3; 1:30 PM (UTC +8:00)	(25–22, 23–25, 16–25, 20–25)			Blue Eagle Gym; Attendance: 160; Referees: Patrick Castillo (NR) and Fernando Velarde (NR)

November 6; 1:30 PM (UTC +8:00)	UST Junior Tigresses	2–3	Adamson Lady Baby Falcons	Paco Arena; Attendance: 140; Referees: Fernando Velarde (NR) and Bobby Celso (NR)
November 6; 1:30 PM (UTC +8:00)	(17–25, 25–21, 25–22, 21–25, 11–15)			Paco Arena; Attendance: 140; Referees: Fernando Velarde (NR) and Bobby Celso (NR)
November 6; 1:30 PM (UTC +8:00)	Adamson wins series in two games			Paco Arena; Attendance: 140; Referees: Fernando Velarde (NR) and Bobby Celso (NR)

=== Finals ===
NU vs Adamson Best-of-three series.
Elimination round results:

- (Sep 15) NU def. Adamson 3–0 • 25–23, 25–18, 25–21
- (Oct 23) NU def. Adamson 3–0 • 25–17, 25–18, 25–16

November 10; 12:00 NN (UTC +8:00)	NUNS Lady Bullpups	3–0	Adamson Lady Baby Falcons	Filoil Flying V Centre, San Juan City; Attendance: 1,075; Referees: Erlindo Eusebio (NR) and Fernando Velarde (NR)
November 10; 12:00 NN (UTC +8:00)	(25–13, 25–17, 25–23)			Filoil Flying V Centre, San Juan City; Attendance: 1,075; Referees: Erlindo Eusebio (NR) and Fernando Velarde (NR)

November 17; 12:00 NN (UTC +8:00)	NUNS Lady Bullpups	3–0	Adamson Lady Baby Falcons	Filoil Flying V Centre, San Juan City; Attendance: 950; Referees: Mark Santos (NR) and Patrick Castillo (NR)
November 17; 12:00 NN (UTC +8:00)	(25–10, 25–17, 25–15)			Filoil Flying V Centre, San Juan City; Attendance: 950; Referees: Mark Santos (NR) and Patrick Castillo (NR)
November 17; 12:00 NN (UTC +8:00)	NU wins series, 2–0			Filoil Flying V Centre, San Juan City; Attendance: 950; Referees: Mark Santos (NR) and Patrick Castillo (NR)

=== Awards ===
UAAP Season 82 girls' volleyball champions
NUNS Lady Bullpups
Fifth title

- Most valuable player (Season): Mhicaela Belen (NUNS Lady Bullpups)
- Most valuable player (Finals): Evangeline Alinsug (NUNS Lady Bullpups)
- Rookie of the Year: Ela Marjanna Raagas (UST Junior Tigresses)
- First Best Outside Spiker: Mhicaela Belen (NUNS Lady Bullpups)
- Second Best Outside Spiker: Kate Nhorrylle Santiago (Adamson Lady Baby Falcons)
- First Best Middle Blocker: Alexis Ciarra Miner (FEU–D Lady Baby Tamaraws)
- Second Best Middle Blocker: Athena Sophia Abbu (UST Junior Tigresses)
- Best opposite spiker: Alyssa Jae Solomon (NUNS Lady Bullpups)
- Best setter: Camilla Victoria Lamina (NUNS Lady Bullpups)
- Best libero: Maria Bernadett Pepito (UST Junior Tigresses)

== Overall championship points ==
=== Juniors' division ===
Team	Boys'	Girls'	Points
Adamson Baby Falcons	6	12	18
Ateneo Blue Eaglets	2	—	2
Zobel Junior Archers	4	8	12
FEU–D Baby Tamaraws	12	6	18
NUNS Bullpups	15	15	30
UE Junior Red Warriors	10	4	14
UPIS Junior Fighting Maroons	—	2	2
UST Tiger Cubs	8	10	18

Pts.	Ranking
15	Champion
12	2nd
10	3rd
8	4th
6	5th
4	6th
2	7th
1	8th
—	Did not join

In case of a tie, the team with the higher position in any tournament is ranked higher. If both are still tied, they are listed by alphabetical order.

How rankings are determined:

- Ranks 5th to 8th determined by elimination round standings.
- Loser of the #1 vs #4 semifinal match-up is ranked 4th
- Loser of the #2 vs #3 semifinal match-up is ranked 3rd
- Loser of the finals is ranked 2nd
- Champion is ranked 1st

== See also ==
- NCAA Season 95 volleyball tournaments

Preceded by Season 81 (2018)	UAAP volleyball tournaments Season 82 (2019)	Succeeded by Season 84 (2022)
