= Priyanka Bora =

Priyanka Bora may refer to:

- Priyanka Bora (actress)
- Priyanka Bora (volleyball)
