= Anna Mathew (volleyball) =

Indian volleyball player

Anna Mathew (born 18 March 2000) is an Indian volleyball player from Kerala. She plays for India women's national volleyball team as a middle blocker, and for Kerala in the domestic tournaments.

She did her graduation at Assumption College, Changanacherry.

== Career ==
In January 2026, she represented the Kerala team that won the 72nd Senior National Volleyball Championship at Varanasi. In the semifinals, Kerala defeated hosts Uttar Pradesh 3–0. In 2022–23, she also played for Kerala State Electricity Board team.

In June 2025, she was part of the Indian women's volleyball team that played the 2025 AVC Women's Nations Cup in Vietnam.

In October 2018, she represented the MG University team which won the South Zone Inter-Varsity volleyball championship at Andhra Pradesh and later in December, the team won silver in the All India Inter University at Jaipur. In January 2022, she was also part of the same team that won bronze in the inter-university championship at Bhubaneshwar.
