= Sivapriya Govind =

Indian volleyball player

Sivapriya Govind (born 29 October 1998) is an Indian volleyball player from Kerala. She plays for India women's national volleyball team as a libero, and for Kerala in the domestic tournament.

She is from Kannur, Kerala. In December 2018, she represented Kannur U21 team before she was selected for the India team.

In June 2025, she was part of the senior India volleyball team that took part in the inaugural AVC Nations Cup formerly known as AVC Women’s Challenge Cup. India beath Mongolia in the play-off match to finish 9th at Hanoi, Vietnam.
