= Kim Yong-mi =

Kim Yong-mi (김용미) or Kim Yŏng-mi (김영미) may refer to:

- Kim Yong-mi (cyclist) (김용미, born 1976), South Korean cyclist
- Kim Yong-mi (synchronized swimmer) (김영미, born 1989), North Korean synchronized swimmer
- Kim Yong-mi (volleyball) (김영미, born 1992), North Korean volleyball player
