= Leela Hamid =

Maldivian volleyball player (born 1984)

Personal information
- Full name: ލީލާ ޙާމިދު
- Nationality: Maldives
- Born: 10 February 1984 (age 42)
- Height: 165 cm (65 in)

Volleyball information
- Position: middle blocker

Career
Years	Teams
2010	Police

National team
2010	Maldives

Leela Hamid (born 2 October 1984) is a retired Maldivian female volleyball player, playing as a middle blocker. She was part of the Maldives women's national volleyball team.

She participated at the 2010 Asian Games. On club level she played for Police in 2010.
