= India women's national volleyball team =

National sports team

India
- Association: Volleyball Federation of India
- Confederation: AVC
- Head coach: Jana Kulan
- FIVB ranking: 64 ▲4 (24 May 2026)

Uniforms
Home	Away

World Championship
- Appearances: 1 (First in 1952)
- Best result: 8th (1952)

Asian Championship
- Appearances: 9 (First in 1979)
- Best result: 7th (1979, 2023)
Honours
Asian Nations Cup
Silver medal – second place	2022 Nakhon Pathom	Team
CAVA Championship
Gold medal – first place	2024 Kathmandu	Team
Bronze medal – third place	2026 Kathmandu	Team
CAVA Challenge Cup
Gold medal – first place	2023 Kathmandu	Team
Lusofonia Games
Gold medal – first place	2014 Goa	Team
Bronze medal – third place	2009 Lisbon	Team
South Asian Games
Gold medal – first place	1999 Kathmandu	Team
Gold medal – first place	2004 Islamabad	Team
Gold medal – first place	2006 Colombo	Team
Gold medal – first place	2010 Dhaka	Team
Gold medal – first place	2016 Guwahati	Team
Gold medal – first place	2019 Kathmandu	Team

The India women's national volleyball team represents India in international competitions and is managed by the Volleyball Federation of India.

In July 2018, Minimol Abraham was appointed as the captain of the Indian national team for the 2018 Asian Games. The team won the gold medal at the 2019 South Asian Games as they defeated Nepal in the final.

== Tournament record ==
=== Summer Olympics ===
Similar to their male counterparts, the Indian women's team has never qualified for the summer Olympics.

Summer Olympics record						Qualification record		
Year	Result	Position	Pld	W	L	Pld	W	L
(Japan) 1964–1972 (West Germany)	Did not qualify					–		
(Canada) 1976	Did not enter					Did not enter		
(Soviet Union) 1980	Did not qualify					7th		
(United States) 1984	Did not enter					Did not enter		
(South Korea) 1988	Did not enter					Did not enter		
(Spain) 1992	Did not qualify					14th		
(United States) 1996–2020 (Japan)	Did not qualify					Did not qualify		
(France) 2024	Did not qualify					Did not qualify		
(United States) 2028	To be determined					TBD		
Total	0/15					0	0	0

=== FIVB World Championship ===
India has qualified for the World Championship only once.

FIVB World Championship record						Qualification record		
Year	Result	Position	Pld	W	L	Pld	W	L
(Soviet Union) 1952	Round robin	8th	7	0	7	–		
(France) 1956–1974 (Mexico)	Did not qualify					–		
(Soviet Union) 1978	Did not enter					Did not enter		
(Peru) 1982	Did not qualify					6	0	6
(Czechoslovakia) 1986–1990 (China)	Did not enter					Did not enter		
(Brazil) 1994	Did not qualify					14th		
(Japan) 1998–2010 (Japan)	Did not enter					Did not enter		
(Japan) 2014	Did not qualify					6	3	3
(Japan) 2018	Suspended					Suspended		
(Netherlands) (Poland) 2022	Did not qualify					No Asian qualification were held		
(Thailand) 2025	Did not qualify					5	1	4
(Canada) (United States) 2027	To be determined					To be determined		
(Philippines) 2029	To be determined					To be determined		
Totals	1/22	8th	7	0	7	17	4	13

=== Asian Championship ===
Asian Volleyball Championship record
Year	Position
(Hong Kong) 1979	7th
(China) 1991	11th
(China) 2005	8th
(Vietnam) 2009	11th
(Taiwan) 2011	11th
(Thailand) 2013	11th
(China) 2015	10th
(South Korea) 2019	10th
(Thailand) 2023	7th

=== Asian Nations Cup ===
Asian Nations Cup record
Year	Position
(Thailand) 2022	2nd place, silver medalist(s)
(Indonesia) 2023	4th
(Philippines) 2024	5th
(Vietnam) 2025	9th

=== Asian Games ===
Asian Games record
Year	Position
(India) 1982	6th
(China) 2010	9th
(South Korea) 2014	8th
(Indonesia) 2018	10th
(China) 2022	9th

=== CAVA Championship ===
CAVA Championship record
Year	Position
(Nepal) 2024	(gold)
(Uzbekistan) 2025	DNP
(Nepal) 2026	(bronze)

=== CAVA Challenge Cup ===
CAVA Challenge Cup record
Year	Position
(Nepal) 2023	(gold)

=== Lusofonia Games ===
Lusofonia Games record
Year	Position
(Portugal) 2009	3rd place, bronze medalist(s)
(India) 2014	1st place, gold medalist(s)

=== South Asian Games ===
South Asian Games record
Year	Position
(Nepal) 1999	1st place, gold medalist(s)
(Pakistan) 2004	1st place, gold medalist(s)
(Sri Lanka) 2006	1st place, gold medalist(s)
(Bangladesh) 2010	1st place, gold medalist(s)
(India) 2016	1st place, gold medalist(s)
(Nepal) 2019	1st place, gold medalist(s)

== Results and schedule ==
=== 2026 ===
22 May 2026; 15:30 UTC+05:45	Nepal	2–3	India	Kathmandu
22 May 2026; 15:30 UTC+05:45	(25–21, 20–25, 19–25, 25-21, 9-15); Report			Kathmandu

23 May 2026; 14:30 UTC+05:45	India	3–0	Maldives	Kathmandu
23 May 2026; 14:30 UTC+05:45	(25–9, 25–14, 25–17); Report			Kathmandu

25 May 2026; 14:30 UTC+05:45	India	3–0	Kyrgyzstan	Kathmandu
25 May 2026; 14:30 UTC+05:45	(25–14, 26–24, 25–13); Report			Kathmandu

28 May 2026; 14:30 UTC+05:45	India	0–3	Kazakhstan	Kathmandu
28 May 2026; 14:30 UTC+05:45	(21–25, 17–25, 14–25); Report			Kathmandu

29 May 2026; 13:00 UTC+05:45	India	3–1	Nepal	Kathmandu
29 May 2026; 13:00 UTC+05:45	(25–23, 25–22, 15–25, 25-22); Report			Kathmandu

== Team ==
=== Current squad ===
The following list consists of 14 players who were called for 2026 CAVA Women's Volleyball Championship.

#	Position	Name	Date of birth	State
1	S	Nandana Valappil (c)	14 December 2002 (age 23)	(India) Kerala
2	S	Chandana Soniya Kumar	2 March 2003 (age 23)	(India) Kerala
3	A	Ayushi Bhandari	27 February 1998 (age 28)	(India) Himachal Pradesh
4	A	Shaalini Saravanan	19 July 2000 (age 26)	(India) Tamil Nadu
5	A	Prerona Pal	18 August 2004 (age 22)	(India) Andaman and Nicobar Islands
6	A	Anusree Kambrath Poyili	8 October 1997 (age 28)	(India) Kerala
7	U	Kavita Suthar	15 January 2006 (age 20)	(India) Rajasthan
8	U	Anagha Radhakrishnan	10 July 2002 (age 24)	(India) Kerala
9	B	Shilpa Rajendrandnair Sindhu	26 February 2002 (age 24)	(India) Kerala
10	B	Arya Kuriyedath	30 January 2002 (age 24)	(India) Kerala
11	B	Anna Mathew	18 March 2000 (age 26)	(India) Kerala
12	B	Anamika Palliyath	24 November 2004 (age 21)	(India) Kerala
13	L	Sathi Das	13 April 2004 (age 22)	(India) West Bengal
14	L	Ananya Das	14 October 2000 (age 25)	(India) West Bengal

=== Former squads ===
- 2025 AVC Women's Nations Cup — 9th place
  Anusree Kambrath Poyili (c), Sivapriya Govind, Abitha Anilkumar, Shaalini Saravanan, Ezhilmathi Dhanam Palanivel, Shilpa Rajendrandnair Sindhu, Anagha Radhakrishnan, Ayushi Bhandari, Kavita Suthar, Anna Mathew, Devika Devarajan, Amitha Keekoth, Ananya Sree Pullari, Ananya Das, head coach: Nilesh Mate

== Coaching staff ==
As of May 2026

Position	Name
Head coach	(Slovakia) (Azerbaijan) Jana Kulan
Assistant coaches	(India) Hema Kelkar (India) K. R. Laxmi Narayana
Strength and conditioning coach	(India) Sharan Preet Kaur
Physio	(India) Bhaskar Borah

== Notable players ==
- Minimol Abraham
- Priyanka Bora
- Priyanka Khedkar
- Aswani Kiran
- Nirmal Saini
- Jagmati Sangwan
- Soorya Thottangal

== See also ==
- India men's national volleyball team
- India women's national under-20 volleyball team
- India women's national under-18 volleyball team
