= Cess Robles =

Filipino volleyball player (born 1999)

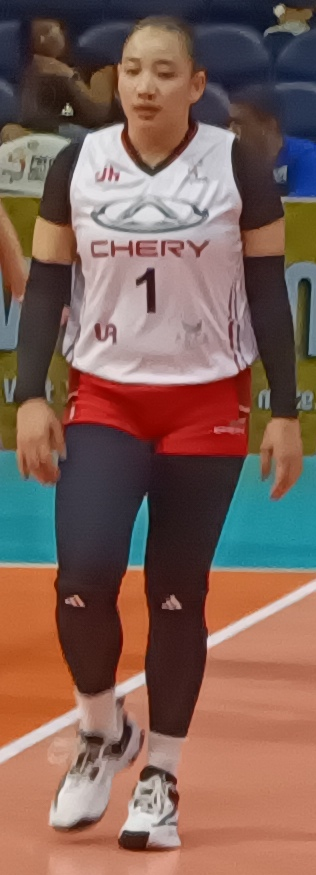
- R0bles in 2025

Personal information
- Full name: Princess Anne Robles
- Nickname: Cess
- Home town: Iloilo City, Iloilo, Philippines
- Education: National University
- Height: 1.60 m (5 ft 3 in)

Volleyball information
- Position: Outside hitter
- Current team: Zus Coffee Thunderbelles

Career
- Years: Team
- 2018: BaliPure–NU Water Defenders
- 2023–2025: Chery Tiggo Crossovers
- 2026–present: Zus Coffee Thunderbelles

Princess Anne "Cess" Robles is a Filipino professional volleyball player for the Zus Coffee Thunderbelles of the Premier Volleyball League (PVL).

== Career ==
=== Collegiate ===
Robles played for the Lady Bulldogs of the National University in the University Athletic Association of the Philippines from 2018 to 2023.

The BaliPure Purest Water Defenders of the then-semiprofessional Premier Volleyball League partnered with NU. Robles was part of the BaliPure team which played at the 2018 Reinforced Conference.

In 2019, Robles won best Server in the UAAP Season 81 women's volleyball tournaments.

In 2022, Robles and her team National University won against De la Salle University and declared as champions in the UAAP Season 84 women's volleyball tournaments. She also bagged the Finals MVP award.

She and her teammates Jen Nierva and Joyme Cagande played their final playing year with the Lady Bulldogs in Season 85, where they finished in second place after losing to DLSU Lady Spikers.

=== Club ===
In May 2023, Robles joins the Chery Tiggo Crossovers of the Premier Volleyball League (PVL) in the lead up to the 2023 Invitational Conference.

Robles was left without a club after Chery Tiggo disbanded in December 2025 but was shortly signed in by the Strong Group Athletics to either play for the Farm Fresh Foxies or the Zus Coffee Thunderbelles.

== Personal life ==
Robles took an elementary education degree at National University.

== Awards ==
UAAP women's volleyball

- Finals Most Valuable Player: 2022 (Season 84)
- Best Server: 2019 (Season 81)
- Medals:
  - Champions: 2022 (Season 84)
  - Runner-up: 2023 (Season 85)

Shakey's Super League

- Medals:
  - Champions: 2022 Pre-season

UAAP girls' volleyball

- Finals Most Valuable Player: 2017 (Season 79)

PNVF Champions League

- Medals:
  - Third place: 2024
