= UAAP Season 84 women's volleyball tournament =

Volleyball tournament

UAAP Season 84
- Fully Alive. Champions for Life!
- Host school: Ateneo de Manila University
| Women's Finals | G1 | G2 | Wins |
|---|---|---|---|
| NU Lady Bulldogs | 3 | 3 | 2 |
| DLSU Lady Spikers | 0 | 0 | 0 |
- Duration: June 18–21, 2022
- Arena(s): Mall of Asia Arena
- Finals MVP: Princess Anne Robles
- Winning coach: Ray Karl Dimaculangan
- Semifinalists: Ateneo Lady Eagles; UST Growling Tigresses
- TV network(s): UAAP Varsity Channel; Cignal TV; One Sports iWantTFC

The UAAP Season 84 volleyball tournaments was the volleyball event of the University Athletic Association of the Philippines for its 2021–22 school year. This was the first completed tournament since 2019. The men's, boys' and girls' volleyball tournaments were not held due to the pandemic. The games were held at the Mall of Asia Arena.

== Tournament format ==
The usual UAAP tournament format for tournaments having all eight teams will be followed:

1. Double round eliminations; top four teams advance to the playoffs
  - If there is a tie for second or fourth, a one-game playoff will be held
2. If a team wins all elimination round games:
  - #1 seed advance to the finals outright
  - #2 seed advance to the second round of the stepladder semifinals with the twice-to-beat advantage; winner advances to the finals
  - #3 and #4 seeds advance to the first round of the stepladder semifinals in a one-game playoff; winner advances to the second round
3. If no team wins all elimination round games:
  - #1 with the twice-to-beat advantage vs #4 seed in the semifinals
  - #2 with the twice-to-beat advantage vs #3 seed in the semifinals
4. The finals is a best-of-three series.

== Teams ==
All eight member universities of the UAAP fielded teams in the women's division.

| University | Team |
|---|---|
| Adamson University | Lady Falcons |
| Ateneo de Manila University | Blue Eagles |
| De La Salle University | Lady Spikers |
| Far Eastern University | Lady Tamaraws |
| National University | Lady Bulldogs |
| University of the East | Lady Warriors |
| University of the Philippines | Lady Maroons |
| University of Santo Tomas | Golden Tigresses |

== Team line-ups ==
Adamson Lady Falcons
| No. | Name | Position |
|---|---|---|
| 1 | MARCE, Aliah | OH |
| 2 | GENESIS, Trisha Mae | OH |
| 5 | ROMERO, Louie (c) | S |
| 6 | NUIQUE, May Ann | OP |
| 7 | MACASLANG, Krich Aeshelooz | MB |
| 9 | ALMONTE, Lucille May | OH |
| 11 | CRUZ, Rizza Andrea | MB |
| 12 | TAGSIP, Arylle Ckyle | MB |
| 13 | BALANG, Princess Niña | L |
| 14 | SANTIAGO, Kate Nhorylle | OP |
| 15 | INFANTE, Hannah Nicole | L |
| 16 | YANDOC, Nikka Sophia Ruth | S |
| 17 | LALONGISIP, Maria Rochelle | OH |
| 18 | TORING, Lorene Grace | MB |
| | ADOLFO, Antonette | OH |
| | ALCANTARA, Angelica | S |
| | VERDEFLOR, Ma. Joahna Karen | L |
| | VILLEGAS, Jen Kylene | MB |
| | GIRON, Lerma | HC |

Ateneo Lady Eagles
| No. | Name | Position |
|---|---|---|
| 1 | RAVENA, Danielle Theris (c) | L |
| 4 | SULIT, Yvana Avik | MB |
| 5 | GANDLER, Vanessa | OH |
| 6 | MARAGUINOT, Janel | S |
| 7 | CRUZ, Kiara Cyrene | S |
| 8 | DELOS REYES, Jeycel Ann | MB |
| 9 | FUJIMOTO, Takako | S |
| 11 | RAAGAS, Erika Beatriz | OP |
| 12 | NARIT, Joan Decemary | MB |
| 14 | MINER, Alexis Ciarra | MB |
| 15 | ILDEFONSO, Sofia Daniela | OP |
| 16 | DE GUZMAN, Lyann Marie Loise | OP |
| 17 | NISPEROS, Faith Janine Shirley | OH |
| 19 | DOROMAL, Roma Mae | L |
| 3 | CANE, Jan Angeli | OP |
| 18 | SANTOS, Jillian Haley | OH |
| 20 | NG, Briana Fiby | S |
| 24 | LICAUCO, Jean Arianne May | L |
| | ALMADRO, Oliver Allan | HC |

De La Salle Lady Spikers
| No. | Name | Position |
|---|---|---|
| 1 | ORDIALES, Maria Jessa | MB |
| 2 | SHARMA, Mereophe Aevangeline | MB |
| 3 | GAGATE, Thea Allison | MB |
| 4 | CRUZ, Leila Jane | OP |
| 5 | JAZARENO, Ylizyeth Justine | L |
| 6 | MALALUAN, Alleiah Jan | OH |
| 8 | DELA CRUZ, Jolina | OH |
| 9 | CORONEL, Julia Cyrille | S |
| 10 | LARROZA, Princess Maicah | L |
| 11 | ALBA, Marionne Angelique (c) | S |
| 16 | SOREÑO, Baby Jyne | OP |
| 17 | HATULAN, Ynna Nicole Angela | MB |
| 18 | ESPINA, Marite | OH |
| 20 | TOLENTINO, Julyana | S |
| 7 | SANTOS, Erika Mae | OP |
| 12 | FUENTES, Jade Elizabeth | OH |
| 19 | JINGCO, Mary Angelie | L |
| | TORRES, Gillianna Jenya Louise | |
| | DE JESUS, Ramil | HC |

FEU Lady Tamaraws
| No. | Name | Position |
|---|---|---|
| 2 | EBON, Lycha (Former c)^{a} | OP |
| 4 | FERNANDEZ, Jovelyn | OH |
| 5 | UBALDO, Christine | S |
| 6 | JUANGCO, Alexandra Maxine | L |
| 7 | ASIS, Ann Rossell | MB |
| 9 | TAGAOD, Chenie | MB/OH |
| 10 | MORA, Mary Martha Louise^{a} | |
| 11 | GALLO, Gillianne | S |
| 12 | DE GUZMAN, Joann Faeith | L |
| 14 | MONARES, Julianne | OH |
| 16 | TRUZ, Karyme Isabelle | MB |
| 17 | KISEO, Shiela Mae (Interim c)^{a} | OH |
| 18 | MEDINA, Nikka Ann | OH |
| 19 | ASIS, Jean | MB |
| | PAPA, Florize Anne | |
| | MADRIGAL, Princes Ezra | MB |
| | GUZMAN, Angelica Blue | L |
| | OSADA, Hiromi | |
| | PASCUA, George | HC |
Notes: :a.Ebon, initially FEU's team captain, and Mora left the team mid-season. Kiseo was listed as the interim team captain.

NU Lady Bulldogs
| No. | Name | Position |
|---|---|---|
| 1 | DENURA, Pearl An | L |
| 3 | ARROYO, Chinnie Pia | OH |
| 4 | BELEN, Mhicaela | OH |
| 7 | ROBLES, Princess Anne (c) | OH |
| 8 | TORING, Sheena Angela | MB |
| 9 | NIERVA, Jennifer | L |
| 10 | MATA, Alexa Nichole | MB |
| 12 | SOLOMON, Alyssa Jae | OP |
| 13 | LAMINA, Camilla Victoria | S |
| 14 | PANGILINAN, Erin May | OP |
| 15 | RONQUILLO, France Elise | OH |
| 16 | LACSINA, Ivy Keith | MB |
| 17 | CAL, Kamille Angelica | S |
| 18 | CAGANDE, Joyme | S |
| | ACUNA, Jacqueline | |
| | LANDICHO, Mary Antonette | |
| | MABILANGAN, Renee | |
| | MADERAZO, Merriene Kathleen | |
| | DIMACULANGAN, Ray Karl | HC |

UE Lady Warriors
| No. | Name | Position |
|---|---|---|
| 1 | LINGAY, Dalrymple | OH |
| 2 | LANA, Janeca Janine | OH |
| 3 | NAVARRO, Erin Feliz | MB |
| 4 | VILLAMOR, Dea Pauline | |
| 5 | NIEVA, Ercae Darabella | OP |
| 6 | PELAGA, Lia Alexa | MB |
| 9 | BALINGIT, Kaycen | OH |
| 10 | QUIZON, Jhudielle | S |
| 11 | ZETA, Jenina Marie | L |
| 13 | DIMACULANGAN, Von Aleina | S |
| 15 | BORBON, Maria Arabella | |
| 16 | MANALO, Rhea (c) | OP |
| 17 | BABOL, Jasckin May | L |
| 19 | NOGALES, Riza | OH |
| | SUSBILLA, Chris Ann | OH |
| | MILCA, Trisha Mae | |
| | BANGAYAN, Vanesa Karsai | |
| | UMALI, Jessica Danielle | S |
| | DIMACULANGAN, Ronwald | HC |

UP Fighting Maroons
| No. | Name | Position |
|---|---|---|
| 1 | SOTOMIL, Marianne | S |
| 2 | BERNARDO, Lorie Lyn | MB |
| 3 | YTANG, Niña | MB/OH |
| 4 | ALTOMEA, Remelyn | L |
| 5 | ATIENZA, Jaila Marie | MB |
| 6 | ARCE, Ethan Lainne | MB |
| 8 | MONARES, Joan Marie | OH |
| 10 | BERTOLANO, Alyssa | OP |
| 11 | ESLAPOR, Euricka | L |
| 12 | ENCARNACION, Jewel Hannah Ysabelle (c) | OH |
| 16 | BUSTRILLO, Stephanie | OH |
| 17 | GAYO, Jum Marie | S |
| 18 | JABONETA, Irah Anika | OH |
| 19 | OMAR, Alliah Bernise | OP |
| 7 | CELIS, Maria Dannica | MB |
| | BONAFE, Theo Bea | OP |
| | OJEDA, Kirstin Louise | MB |
| | VERGEIRE, Maria Celina | |
| | OKUMU, Godfrey | HC |

UST Growling Tigresses
| No. | Name | Position |
|---|---|---|
| 2 | TUAZON, Donna May | MB |
| 3 | JIMENEZ, Ysabel Jamie | OP |
| 4 | PEPITO, Maria Bernadett | L |
| 5 | HERNANDEZ, Imee Kim Gabriella | MB |
| 6 | ECALLA, Mary Christine | OP |
| 8 | LAURE, Ejiya (c) | OH |
| 10 | VICTORIA, Camille | OH |
| 11 | TAPIA, Ypril Jyrhine | OH |
| 12 | GALDONES, Kecelyn | MB |
| 15 | ROLDAN, Rachelle | OH |
| 16 | MANGULABNAN, Maria Regina Agatha | S |
| 17 | DELERIO, Janel | L |
| 19 | BALCORTA, Janine Kyla | MB |
| 20 | GALANZA, Maria Fe | S |
| | ABELLANA, Pierre Angeli | OH |
| | PERDIDO, Jonna Chris | OH |
| | VERNAIZ, Mary Grace | OH |
| | PENAFIEL, Renee Lou | OH |
| | REYES, Emilio Jr. | HC |

Legend
| S | Setter |
| MB | Middle Blocker |
| OH | Outside Hitter |
| OP | Opposite Hitter |
| L | Libero |
| (c) | Team Captain |
| (r) | Team Reserve(s) |
| HC | Head coach |

== Elimination round ==
=== Team standings ===
| Pos | Team | Pld | W | L | Pts | SW | SL | SR | SPW | SPL | SPR | Qualification |
|---|---|---|---|---|---|---|---|---|---|---|---|---|
| 1 | NU Lady Bulldogs | 14 | 14 | 0 | 42 | 42 | 5 | 8.400 | 1152 | 839 | 1.373 | Advance to the finals (Note: As NU won all of their elimination round games, the stepladder format will be used instead of the regular Final Four format.) |
| 2 | De La Salle Lady Spikers (H) | 14 | 10 | 4 | 30 | 33 | 17 | 1.941 | 1158 | 987 | 1.173 | Twice-to-beat in stepladder round 2 |
| 3 | UST Growling Tigresses | 14 | 9 | 5 | 24 | 30 | 24 | 1.250 | 1217 | 1215 | 1.002 | Proceed to stepladder round 1 |
| 4 | Ateneo Lady Eagles | 14 | 8 (Note: Fourth seed playoff: Ateneo 3–0 Adamson) | 6 | 24 | 31 | 22 | 1.409 | 1207 | 1116 | 1.082 | Proceed to stepladder round 1 |
| 5 | Adamson Lady Falcons | 14 | 8 | 6 | 27 | 31 | 23 | 1.348 | 1200 | 1091 | 1.100 | |
| 6 | UP Lady Maroons | 14 | 5 | 9 | 14 | 19 | 30 | 0.633 | 1016 | 1102 | 0.922 | |
| 7 | UE Lady Warriors | 14 | 1 | 13 | 4 | 6 | 40 | 0.150 | 840 | 1112 | 0.755 | |
| 8 | FEU Lady Tamaraws | 14 | 1 | 13 | 3 | 10 | 41 | 0.244 | 897 | 1225 | 0.732 | |

Source: The UAAP on Facebook
Rules for classification: 1) number of wins; 2) if tied for #2 or #4, one-game playoff; 3) match points; 4) sets ratio; 5) points ratio; 6) head-to-head record
(H) Host

=== Match-up results ===
| | Round 1 | | | | | | | Round 2 | | | | | | |
| Team ╲ Game | 1 | 2 | 3 | 4 | 5 | 6 | 7 | 8 | 9 | 10 | 11 | 12 | 13 | 14 |
|---|---|---|---|---|---|---|---|---|---|---|---|---|---|---|
| Adamson | NU school colors | La Salle school colors | Ateneo school colors | UP school colors | FEU school colors | UST school colors | UE school colors | UST school colors | UE school colors | FEU school colors | NU school colors | Ateneo school colors | UP school colors | La Salle school colors |
| Ateneo | La Salle school colors | NU school colors | Adamson school colors | FEU school colors | UP school colors | UE school colors | UST school colors | FEU school colors | NU school colors | UST school colors | UE school colors | Adamson school colors | La Salle school colors | UP school colors |
| La Salle | Ateneo school colors | Adamson school colors | NU school colors | UST school colors | UE school colors | UP school colors | FEU school colors | NU school colors | FEU school colors | UP school colors | UST school colors | UE school colors | Ateneo school colors | Adamson school colors |
| FEU | UST school colors | UP school colors | UE school colors | Ateneo school colors | Adamson school colors | NU school colors | La Salle school colors | Ateneo school colors | La Salle school colors | Adamson school colors | UP school colors | UST school colors | NU school colors | UE school colors |
| NU | Adamson school colors | Ateneo school colors | La Salle school colors | UE school colors | UST school colors | FEU school colors | UP school colors | La Salle school colors | Ateneo school colors | UE school colors | Adamson school colors | UP school colors | FEU school colors | UST school colors |
| UE | UP school colors | UST school colors | FEU school colors | NU school colors | La Salle school colors | Ateneo school colors | Adamson school colors | UP school colors | Adamson school colors | NU school colors | Ateneo school colors | La Salle school colors | UST school colors | FEU school colors |
| UP | UE school colors | FEU school colors | UST school colors | Adamson school colors | Ateneo school colors | La Salle school colors | NU school colors | UE school colors | UST school colors | La Salle school colors | FEU school colors | NU school colors | Adamson school colors | Ateneo school colors |
| UST | FEU school colors | UE school colors | UP school colors | La Salle school colors | NU school colors | Adamson school colors | Ateneo school colors | Adamson school colors | UP school colors | Ateneo school colors | La Salle school colors | FEU school colors | UE school colors | NU school colors |

Source: UAAP Season 84 Women’s Volleyball Final Stats
= Win; = Loss

=== Game results ===
Results on top and to the right of the gray cells are for first-round games; those to the bottom and to the left of it are for second-round games.

| Team | AdU | AdMU | DLSU | FEU | NU | UE | UP | UST |
|---|---|---|---|---|---|---|---|---|
| Adamson Lady Falcons | | 3–1 | 0–3 | 3–1 | 0–3 | 3–0 | 3–1 | 2–3 |
| Ateneo Lady Eagles | 3–2 | | 1–3 | 3–0 | 1–3 | 3–1 | 3–0 | 1–3 |
| De La Salle Lady Archers | 1–3 | 3–2 | | 3–1 | 0–3 | 3–0 | 3–0 | 2–3 |
| FEU Lady Tamaraws | 0–3 | 0–3 | 0–3 | | 0–3 | 3–2 | 2–3 | 0–3 |
| NU Lady Bulldogs | 3–1 | 3–1 | 3–0 | 3–1 | | 3–0 | 3–0 | 3–1 |
| UE Lady Warriors | 0–3 | 0–3 | 0–3 | 3–1 | 0–3 | | 0–3 | 0–3 |
| UP Lady Maroons | 1–3 | 1–3 | 0–3 | 3–0 | 0–3 | 3–0 | | 3–1 |
| UST Growling Tigresses | 3–2 | 0–3 | 1–3 | 3–1 | 0–3 | 3–0 | 3–1 | |

Source: UAAP Season 84 Women’s Volleyball Final Stats
Legend: Blue = left column team win; Red = top row team win.

== Fourth seed playoff ==
Adamson and Ateneo, which are tied at fourth place, will play for the #4 seed, the last berth of the stepladder playoffs.

| June 11, 2022; 5:00 PM (UTC+8:00) | Adamson Lady Falcons | 0–3 | Ateneo Lady Eagles | MOA Arena, Pasay; Attendance: 7,901; Referees: Rene Gaspillo (NR) & Lumer Pajarillo (NR) |
| June 11, 2022; 5:00 PM (UTC+8:00) | (20–25, 26–28, 22–25); P2 | | | MOA Arena, Pasay; Attendance: 7,901; Referees: Rene Gaspillo (NR) & Lumer Pajarillo (NR) |

== Bracket ==
Stepladder round 1 (One-game playoff)
3 | UST | 0
4 | Ateneo | 3

Stepladder round 2 (No. 2 has twice-to-beat advantage)
2 | La Salle | 3
4 | Ateneo | 0

Finals (Best-of-three series)
1 | NU | 3 | 3
2 | La Salle | 0 | 0

== Stepladder semifinals ==
=== First round ===
This is a one-game playoff.

| June 14, 2022; 6:30 PM (UTC+8:00) | UST Growling Tigresses | 0–3 | Ateneo Lady Eagles | MOA Arena, Pasay; Attendance: 11,025; Referees: Mark Santos (NR) & Fernando Velarde (NR) |
| June 14, 2022; 6:30 PM (UTC+8:00) | (23–25, 23–25, 20–25); P2 | | | MOA Arena, Pasay; Attendance: 11,025; Referees: Mark Santos (NR) & Fernando Velarde (NR) |
| June 14, 2022; 6:30 PM (UTC+8:00) | Ateneo advances to the second round | | | MOA Arena, Pasay; Attendance: 11,025; Referees: Mark Santos (NR) & Fernando Velarde (NR) |

=== Second round ===
La Salle has the twice-to-beat advantage.

| June 16, 2022; 6:30 PM (UTC+8:00) | De La Salle Lady Spikers | 3–0 | Ateneo Lady Eagles | MOA Arena, Pasay; Attendance: 14,321; Referees: Lumer Pajarillo (NR) & Rene Gaspillo (NR) |
| June 16, 2022; 6:30 PM (UTC+8:00) | (25–19, 25–20, 25–23); P2 | | | MOA Arena, Pasay; Attendance: 14,321; Referees: Lumer Pajarillo (NR) & Rene Gaspillo (NR) |
| June 16, 2022; 6:30 PM (UTC+8:00) | La Salle wins series in one game | | | MOA Arena, Pasay; Attendance: 14,321; Referees: Lumer Pajarillo (NR) & Rene Gaspillo (NR) |

== Finals ==
NU will have a best-of-three finals series against the semifinals winner.

| June 18, 2022; 5:00 PM (UTC+8:00) | NU Lady Bulldogs | 3–0 | De La Salle Lady Archers | MOA Arena, Pasay; Attendance: 15,302; Referees: Fernando Velarde (NR) & Angelo Haw (NR) |
| June 18, 2022; 5:00 PM (UTC+8:00) | (25–21, 25–12, 25–20); P2 | | | MOA Arena, Pasay; Attendance: 15,302; Referees: Fernando Velarde (NR) & Angelo Haw (NR) |

| June 21, 2022; 6:30 PM (UTC+8:00) | NU Lady Bulldogs | 3–0 | De La Salle Lady Archers | MOA Arena, Pasay; Attendance: 12,621; Referees: Mark Santos (NR) & Fernando Velarde (NR) |
| June 21, 2022; 6:30 PM (UTC+8:00) | (25–15, 25–15, 25–22); P2 | | | MOA Arena, Pasay; Attendance: 12,621; Referees: Mark Santos (NR) & Fernando Velarde (NR) |
| June 21, 2022; 6:30 PM (UTC+8:00) | NU wins series 2–0 | | | MOA Arena, Pasay; Attendance: 12,621; Referees: Mark Santos (NR) & Fernando Velarde (NR) |

- Finals Most Valuable Player: Princess Anne Robles (NU Lady Bulldogs)

== Statistics leaders ==
UAAP Season 84 Women's Volleyball tournament statistics leaders at the end of the elimination round.

=== Best Scorers ===
| Rank | Player | Team | Pos. | Spike | Block | Serve | Total |
|---|---|---|---|---|---|---|---|
| 1 | Ejiya Laure | UST Growling Tigresses | OS | 244 | 17 | 11 | 272 |
| 2 | Faith Nisperos | Ateneo Lady Eagles | OS | 228 | 16 | 23 | 267 |
| 3 | Mhicaela Belen | NU Lady Bulldogs | OS | 173 | 8 | 22 | 203 |
| 4 | Alyssa Bertolano | UP Lady Maroons | OP | 176 | 6 | 15 | 197 |
| 5 | Alleiah Jan Malaluan | De La Salle Lady Spikers | OS | 171 | 7 | 15 | 193 |

=== Best Spikers ===
| Rank | Player | Team | Pos. | Spikes | Attempts | Success Rate |
|---|---|---|---|---|---|---|
| 1 | Alyssa Jae Solomon | NU Lady Bulldogs | OP | 145 | 372 | 38.98% |
| 2 | Mhicaela Belen | NU Lady Bulldogs | OS | 173 | 444 | 38.96% |
| 3 | Princess Anne Robles | NU Lady Bulldogs | OS | 139 | 370 | 37.57% |
| 4 | Alyssa Bertolano | UP Fighting Maroons | OP | 176 | 499 | 35.27% |
| 5 | Faith Nisperos | Ateneo Lady Eagles | OS | 228 | 654 | 34.86% |

=== Best Blockers ===
| Rank | Player | Team | Pos. | Blocks | Attempts | Average per set |
|---|---|---|---|---|---|---|
| 1 | Thea Allison Gagate | De La Salle Lady Spikers | MB | 30 | 208 | 0.60 |
| 2 | Alexis Ciarra Miner | Ateneo Lady Eagles | MB | 28 | 210 | 0.53 |
| 3 | Mereophe Aevangeline Sharma | De La Salle Lady Spikers | MB | 25 | 165 | 0.50 |
| 4 | Kecelyn Galdones | UST Growling Tigresses | MB | 27 | 202 | 0.50 |
| 5 | Joan Decemary Narit | Ateneo Lady Eagles | MB | 26 | 152 | 0.49 |

=== Best Servers ===
| Rank | Player | Team | Pos. | Aces | Attempts | Average per set |
|---|---|---|---|---|---|---|
| 1 | Mhicaela Belen | NU Lady Bulldogs | OS | 22 | 167 | 0.47 |
| 2 | Faith Nisperos | Ateneo Lady Eagles | OS | 23 | 198 | 0.43 |
| 3 | Alyssa Jae Solomon | NU Lady Bulldogs | OP | 16 | 163 | 0.34 |
| 4 | Sheena Angela Toring | NU Lady Bulldogs | MB | 15 | 172 | 0.32 |
| 5 | Alyssa Bertolano | UP Lady Maroons | OP | 15 | 160 | 0.31 |

=== Best Diggers ===
| Rank | Player | Team | Pos. | Digs | Attempts | Average per set |
|---|---|---|---|---|---|---|
| 1 | Ylizyeth Justine Jazareno | De La Salle Lady Spikers | L | 239 | 414 | 4.78 |
| 2 | Jennifer Nierva | NU Lady Bulldogs | L | 207 | 345 | 4.40 |
| 3 | Alexandra Maxine Juangco | FEU Lady Tamaraws | L | 204 | 450 | 4.00 |
| 4 | Ma. Bernadett Pepito | UST Growling Tigresses | L | 160 | 276 | 2.96 |
| 5 | Jenina Marie Zeta | UE Lady Warriors | L | 124 | 265 | 2.70 |

=== Best Setters ===
| Rank | Player | Team | Pos. | Running Sets | Attempts | Average per set |
|---|---|---|---|---|---|---|
| 1 | Camilla Victoria Lamina | NU Lady Bulldogs | S | 273 | 1,081 | 5.81 |
| 2 | Louie Romero | Adamson Lady Falcons | S | 254 | 1,485 | 4.70 |
| 3 | Marionne Angelique Alba | De La Salle Lady Spikers | S | 230 | 1,292 | 4.60 |
| 4 | Janel Maraguinot | Ateneo Lady Eagles | S | 238 | 1,407 | 4.49 |
| 5 | Marianne Sotomil | UP Fighting Maroons | S | 186 | 1,266 | 3.80 |

=== Best Receivers ===
| Rank | Player | Team | Pos. | Receptions | Attempts | Efficiency |
|---|---|---|---|---|---|---|
| 1 | Jennifer Nierva | NU Lady Bulldogs | L | 162 | 277 | 55.96% |
| 2 | Janel Delerio | UST Growling Tigresses | L | 185 | 371 | 46.36% |
| 3 | Roma Mae Doromal | Ateneo Lady Eagles | L | 156 | 324 | 44.44% |
| 4 | Ylizyeth Justine Jazareno | De La Salle Lady Spikers | L | 118 | 247 | 44.13% |
| 5 | Jolina Dela Cruz | De La Salle Lady Spikers | OS | 116 | 251 | 41.83% |

== Awards ==
UAAP Season 84 women's volleyball champions
NU Lady Bulldogs
Third title

- Most valuable player: Mhicaela Belen (NU Lady Bulldogs)
- Rookie of the Year: Mhicaela Belen (NU Lady Bulldogs)
- First Best Outside Spiker: Mhicaela Belen (NU Lady Bulldogs)
- Second Best Outside Spiker: Faith Nisperos (Ateneo Lady Eagles)
- First Best Middle Blocker: Thea Allison Gagate (De La Salle Lady Archers)
- Second Best Middle Blocker: Sheena Angela Toring (NU Lady Bulldogs)
- Best Opposite Spiker: Alyssa Jae Solomon (NU Lady Bulldogs)
- Best Setter: Camilla Victoria Lamina (NU Lady Bulldogs)
- Best Libero: Jennifer Nierva (NU Lady Bulldogs)

== See also ==
- NCAA Season 97 women's volleyball tournament

| Preceded by Season 82 (2020) | UAAP volleyball tournaments Season 84 (2022) | Succeeded by Season 85 (2023) |
