= Soorya Thottangal =

Indian volleyball player (born 1989)

Personal information
- Nationality: Indian
- Born: 23 August 1989 (age 37); Kerala, India
- Height: 186 cm (73 in)

Volleyball information
- Position: outside hitter

Career
Years	Teams
2010	Kerala

National team
2010	India

Soorya Thottangal (born 23 August 1989) is an Indian former volleyball player. She was part of the India women's national volleyball team.

She participated at the 2010 Asian Games. On club level she played for Kerala in 2010.
