= Ayushi Bhandari =

Indian volleyball player

Ayushi Bhandari (born 27 February 1998) is an Indian volleyball player from Himachal Pradesh. She plays for India women's national volleyball team as a middle blocker, and for Himachal Pradesh in the domestic tournaments. She is developing as a universal player.

In June 2025, she was the vice-captain of the Indian team that played the AVC Nations Cup, formerly known as AVC Women's Challenge Cup.
