= Aswani Kiran =

Indian volleyball player (born 1985)

Personal information
- Full name: Aswani S Kumar
- Nationality: India
- Born: 15 May 1985 (age 41); Kerala, India
- Height: 177 cm (5 ft 10 in)
- Weight: 68 kg (150 lb)

Volleyball information
- Position: outside hitter

National team
| 2010 | India |

Aswani Kiran (born 15 May 1985) is a former Indian female volleyball player who has also captained the India women's national volleyball team internationally. She was selected to represent India at the 2010 Asian Games, captained the national team at the 2010 Asian Games and was part of the squad which finished 9th in the women's team event.
