= Kavita Suthar =

Indian volleyball player

Kavita Suthar (born 15 January 2006) is an Indian volleyball player from Rajasthan. She plays for India women's national volleyball team as an outside hitter, and for Rajasthan in the domestic tournaments.

Suthar is from Silwala Khurd gram panchayat, Hanumangarh district, Rajasthan. Her father, Subhah Chandra, is an auto spare parts seller. She started playing volleyball in 2018 after her first coach Basant Singh Mann convinced her father to send her to play volleyball.

In June 2022, Suthar was selected to captain the under-18 National Volleyball team for the 23rd Asian U-18 Women's Volleyball Championship at Thailand from 6 to 15 June 2022. She was in Class 12 at that time. She represented Jaipur team and was declared as the best player in the 67th State Level Senior Volleyball Championship held at Bikaner.
