= Devika Devarajan =

Indian volleyball player

Devika Devarajan Kallumambraparambil (born 16 June 1992) is an Indian volleyball player from Kerala. She plays for India women's national volleyball team as a setter, and for Kerala in the domestic tournaments.

== Career ==
In June 2025, she was part of the Indian women's volleyball team that played the 2025 AVC Women's Nations Cup in Vietnam.

In March 2014, she captained the Tamil Nadu team in the Federation Cup Volleyball tournament at Jimmy George stadium, Kizhakkambalam, Kerala. In March 2017, she represented South Central Railway in the P John Memorial all-India volleyball tournament held at the Mayor Radhakrishnan Stadium, Chennai where she was declared as the Best Player (setter) award. In February 2018, she was part of the Railways team that won the 66 Senior National Volleyball Championship at Kozhikode, Kerala.

In June 2022, she was selected for the National camp held at Bhubaneswar where she selected for the India team that took part in the Princess Cup 3rd AVC Women's Challenge Cup Volleyball Championship at Nakhon Pathom, Thailand from 24 to 29 June 2022.
