= Amitha Keekoth =

Indian volleyball player

Amitha Keekoth (born 8 November 2000) is an Indian volleyball player from Kerala. She plays for India women's national volleyball team as a setter, and for Kerala in the domestic tournaments.

In June 2025, she was part of the Indian women's volleyball team that played the 2025 AVC Women's Nations Cup in Vietnam.
