= Ananya Sree Pullari =

Indian volleyball player

Ananya Sree Pullari (born 8 October 2002) is an Indian volleyball player from Telangana. She plays for India women's national volleyball team as a middle blocker, and for Telangana and Indian Railways in the domestic tournaments.

== Early life and education ==
She if from Raikode, Narayanpet district, Telangana. She was born to Pullari Anand and Varalakshmi. Her father used to run a hardware shop. She studied her Class 9 and 10 at Hyderabad and when she returned to her native place for holidays, she joined a summer camp. Earlier, she used to take part in athletics and play basketball in her school. But due to her height, her father joined her in the volleyball camp. After the 20-day camp, she was selected for the Sports Authority of Telangana centre in Saroornagar, Hyderabad. She did her graduation in Physical Education at St. Stephen's College, Pathanapuram, Kollam, Kerala. In June 2025, she was recruited by Bank of Maharashtra in sport quota to play for the bank's volleyball team.

== Career ==
In 2019, she was selected for the Khelo India hostel in Kerala. While in the hostel, she represented Telangana in the Junior National Volleyball Championships. Later, she played many senior tournaments including the Federation Cup. In June 2025, she was part of the Indian team that played the AVC Nations Cup, formerly known as AVC Women's Challenge Cup.
