= Priyanka Bora (volleyball) =

Indian volleyball player (born 1985)

Personal information
- Nationality: Indian
- Born: 7 January 1985 (age 41); Maharashtra, India
- Hometown: Pune
- Height: 178 cm (70 in)
- Weight: 75 kg (165 lb)
- Education: S. P. College, Pune.

Volleyball information
- Position: Middle Blocker/Attacker
- Current club: Deccan Gymkhana

Career
| Years | Teams |
|---|---|
| From 2003 to present | Indian Railways |

National team
| From 2003 to present | India |
Honours
Asian games - 2010, Indian Team Captain - 2010, Shiv Chatrapati Awardee - 2018, 2 SAF games Gold medalist, 13 Gold in Senior Nationals, 2 Silver, 1 Bronze medal. 1 Gold in Sub Junior, 1 Silver and Bronze in Junior Nationals, 1 Bronze in School Nationals,

Priyanka Bora (born 7 January 1985 in Maharashtra, India) is an Indian female volleyball player. She was part of the India women's national volleyball team.

She participated at the 2010 Asian Games. On club level she played for Indian Railways in 2010.
