= Anusree Kambrath Poyili =

Indian volleyball player

Anusree Kambrath Poyili (born 8 October 1997) is an Indian volleyball player from Kerala. She plays for India women's national volleyball team as an outside hitter, and for Kerala and the Indian Railways teams in the domestic tournaments.

In June 2025, she captained the Indian women's volleyball team that played the 2025 AVC Women's Nations Cup in Vietnam, formerly known as AVC Women's Challenge Cup. In June 2022, she was part of the Indian team under captain Nirmal Kaur Saini that played the AVC Women's Challenge Cup in Thailand. In August 2018, she represented India in the Asian Games.
