= Shaalini Saravanan =

Indian volleyball player

Shaalini Saravanan (born 19 July 2000) is an Indian volleyball player from Tamil Nadu. She plays for India women's national volleyball team as an outside hitter, and for Tamil Nadu in the domestic tournaments.

She is from Salem District, Kolathukombai village, Tamil Nadu. She also played Beach Volleyball.

== Career ==
In June 2025, she was part of the Indian women's volleyball team that played the 2025 AVC Women's Nations Cup in Vietnam. She represented India, in the 2022 Asian Games that were played from 23 September to 8 October 2023 at Hangzhou, China. In 2023, she played the AVC Central Zone Championship and the AVC Nations Cup 2023. In 2024, again she played both the tournaments, AVC Central Zone Championship and AVC Nations Cup. In 2024, she was part of the Indian team that won the inaugural CAVA Women's Volleyball Nations League where she was adjudged as joint 'Best Outside Hitter'.

In 2018, she made her Junior India debut at the Asian U19 Championship.
