= Jagmati Sangwan =

Former member of the CPI(Marxist) and AIDWA leader

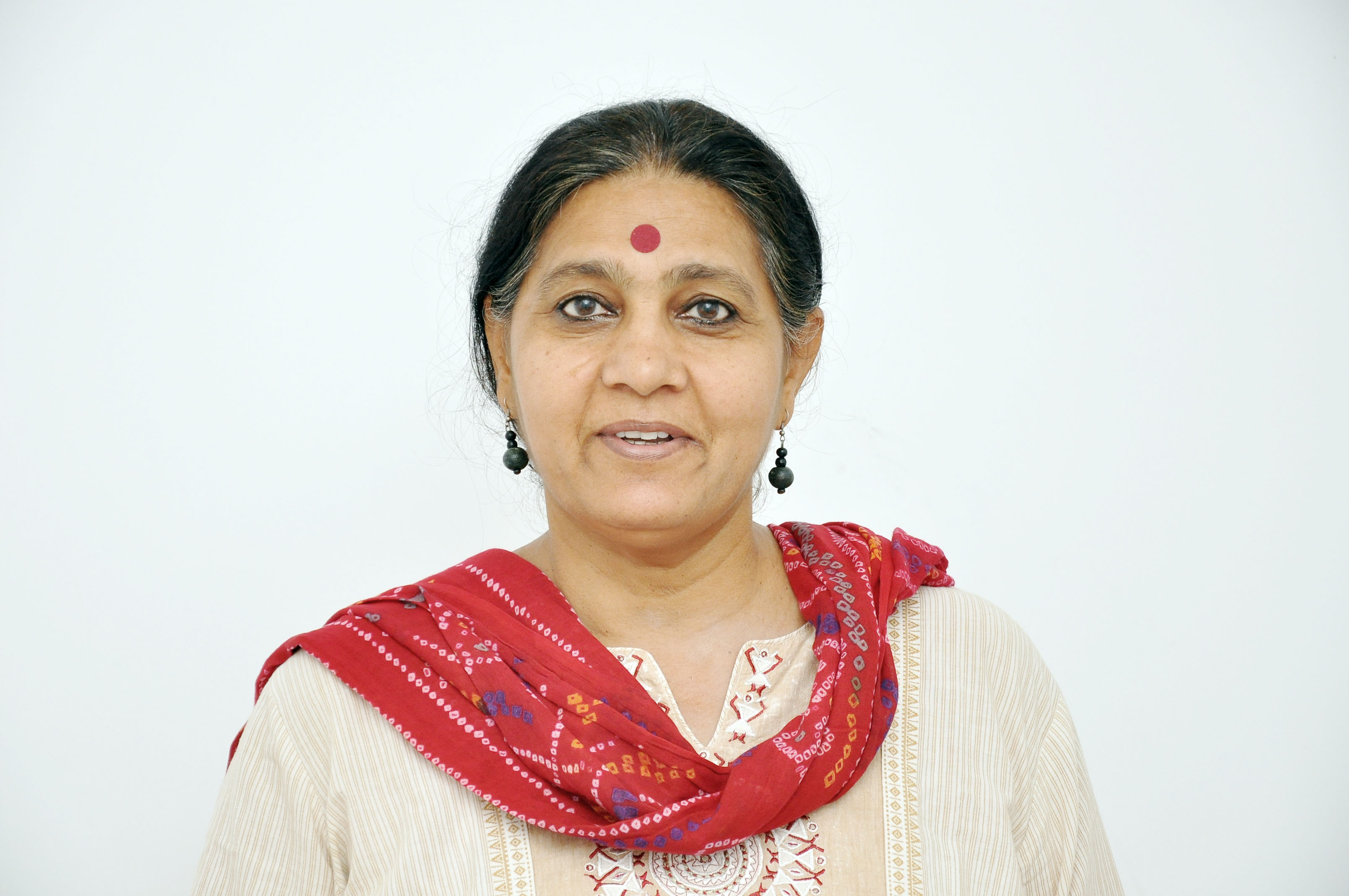
- Born: 2 January 1960 (age 66); Sonipat, Haryana, India
- Occupations: Sportswoman, Political Activist

Jagmati Sangwan (born 2 January 1960) is an Indian political activist and a former Central Committee member of the CPI(M). She was part of the Indian team that won bronze at the Asian Volleyball Championships. She is the first woman sportsperson to receive the Bhim Award for outstanding sportspersons in Haryana. She headed the Kisan Mahila Samiti formed by Samyukt Kisan Morcha (SKM) to look into issues related to women's safety during the Indian farmers' agitation. She's serving as the national Vice-President of AIDWA and Rohtak district secretary of the CPI(M).

== Work ==
Sangwan is known for her work against honour killings in Haryana and in India. She was the General Secretary of the All India Democratic Women's Association and was a Central Committee member of the Communist Party of India (Marxist) but was momentarily expelled after she opposed the party's seat sharing with the Indian National Congress in the 2016 West Bengal Legislative Assembly election. She has campaigned against honour killing and started a campaign against female foeticide. Sangwan is also known for challenging (legally and on ground) the Haryana government's decision to disallow "uneducated" candidates in contesting local panchayat elections. She worked at the University College at Maharishi Dayanand University (MDU) Rohtak and was the Founding Director of MDU's Women's Studies Centre. In June 2016, Sangwan quit the CPI(M) during a Central Committee meeting to protest the seat sharing with the Congress in West Bengal. She was expelled for indiscipline, but her party membership was eventually restored. Later CPM also fielded her as its Mayoral candidate in Rohtak, Haryana.

== Personal life ==
Born in a Sangwan Jat family of Haryana, her father was a Nambardar in Butana village. She was educated at the Sports College for Women, set up in 1978. She is a well known alumna of the Haryana Agricultural University (HAU), Hisar. She played volleyball for India at international level. She has a PhD on status of sports women in Haryana. She is married to Inderjit Singh, former State secretary and Central Committee member of the CPI(M) who is presently active in the nationwide farmers agitation. Singh was also the Students Union President at the HAU, elected more than once. They have one daughter, Akhila who is a journalist and is married to the grandson of Maj Gen Stanley William Burrett
