= Abitha Anilkumar =

Indian volleyball player

Abitha Anilkumar (born 21 December 1997) is an Indian volleyball player from Kerala. She plays for India women's national volleyball team as a middle blocker, and for Kerala in the domestic tournaments.

In June 2025, she was part of the Indian women's volleyball team that played the 2025 AVC Women's Nations Cup in Vietnam.
