= Ananya Das =

Indian volleyball player

Ananya Das (born 14 October 2000) is an Indian volleyball player from West Bengal. She plays for India women's national volleyball team as a libero, and for Odisha and Indian Railways in the domestic tournaments.

Das is from Kolkata, West Bengal. After joining Indian Railways in 2023, she is a resident of Bhubaneswar, Odisha.

== Career ==
In 2023, Das represented India in the Asian Championship 2023 and 4th AVC Nations Cup 2023. She was part of the team that won gold medal in the Central Asian Volleyball Association Challenge Cup in May 2023 at Kathmandu. In 2024, she again represented the country in the AVC Central Zone Championship 2024 and the AVC Nations Cup 2024.

In June 2025, she was part of the Indian team that played the AVC Nations Cup, formerly known as AVC Women's Challenge Cup.

In January 2026, she represented Indian Railways which won a silver medal in the 72nd Senior National Volleyball Championship at Varanasi, Uttar Pradesh. She was awarded as the best Libero of the championship.

On the National Sports Day on 29 August 2023, she was awarded a cash prize, along with 8 other volleyball players, for their performance at the national and international level by Government of Odisha.
