= Jen Nierva =

Filipino volleyball player

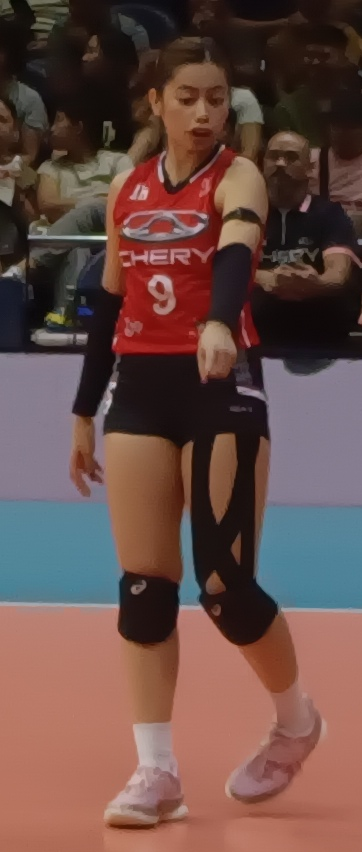
- Nierva with the Chery Tiggo Crossovers in 2025

Personal information
- Full name: Jennifer Nierva
- Nationality: Filipino
- Born: November 8, 1999 (age 27)
- Home town: Iloilo, Philippines
- Education: National University
- Height: 1.66 m (5 ft 5 in)

Volleyball information
- Position: Libero
- Current team: Creamline Cool Smashers

Career
- Years: Team
- 2018: BaliPure Purest Water Defenders
- 2023–2025: Chery Tiggo Crossovers
- 2026–: Creamline Cool Smashers

National team
- Years: Team
- 2024–present: Philippines
Honours
Women's volleyball
Representing Philippines
Asian Nations Cup
Silver medal – second place	2025 Hanoi	Team
Bronze medal – third place	2024 Manila	Team
SEA V.League
Bronze medal – third place	2024 Vĩnh Phúc	Leg 1
Bronze medal – third place	2024 Nakhon Ratchasima	Leg 2

Jennifer Nierva (born November 8, 1999) is a Filipino professional volleyball player who is a libero for the Creamline Cool Smashers of the Premier Volleyball League (PVL).

== Career ==
=== Collegiate ===
Nierva played for the Lady Bulldogs of the National University from 2019–2023. She plays as the Libero of the team.

In 2022, she won the Best Libero Award in the UAAP Season 84 volleyball tournaments and her team National University won the title after 65 years.

Unlike her teammate Ivy Lacsina, she, Princess Robles, and Joyme Cagande played their final playing year in the UAAP Season 85. They finished in second place after losing to DLSU Lady Spikers.

== Personal life ==
Nierva took a degree in financial management at National University and currently taking AB Communications.

Nierva dated ECHO Philippines player Yawi until 2023.

== Awards ==
=== Individual ===
Year	League	Season/Conference	Award	Ref
2022	UAAP	84	Best Libero	

=== Collegiate ===
Year	League	Season/Conference	Title	Ref
2022	UAAP	84	Champions	
2022	SSL	Pre-Season	Champions	
2023	UAAP	85	Runner-Up	

=== Clubs ===
Year	League	Season/Conference	Club	Title	Ref
2024	PNVF	Champions League (Women)	Chery Tiggo Crossovers	3rd place	
2025	PVL	on Tour	Chery Tiggo Crossovers	Runner-up	
2026	PVL	All-Filipino	Creamline Cool Smashers	Champions	
