= Aishath Nazima =

Maldivian athlete (born 1980)

Personal information
- Nickname: Naxi
- Nationality: Maldives
- Born: 5 September 1980 (age 45)
- Height: 170 cm (67 in)
- Weight: 68

Sport
- Sport: Volleyball, Basketball, and Handball
- Position: outside hitter
- Club: police club

Aishath Nazima (born 5 September 1980) is a retired Maldivian athlete. She competed in Volleyball, Basketball, Netball, Athletics and Handball. She was selected as Asia's 11th player of the tournament. She won one silver medal and one bronze medal. She was part of the Maldives women's national Volleyball, Athletics, Netball, Basketball and Handball teams. She is the only woman to become the Vice president of Football Association of Maldives.

She participated at the Volleyball three-nation Cup (Colombo), Saff Games Volleyball (1999 Nepal) Saff games Handball (Gohati India) Asian games Netball (Singapore) Asian Games Netball (Malaysia) Invitation tournament in Pakistan Handball. 1st Beach games Beach Volleyball (hampanthota Sri Lanka) at the 2010 Asian Games. On club level she played for the Maldives Police in 2010.
