= Kim Yong-mi (volleyball) =

North Korean volleyball player (born 1992)

Personal information
- Nationality: North Korea
- Born: 14 November 1992 (age 33)
- Height: 176 cm (69 in)

Volleyball information
- Position: outside hitter
- Number: 2 (national team)

Career
Years	Teams
2010	(North Korea) Sobaeksu

National team
2010	North Korea

- Kim Yong-mi
- Hangul: 김영미
- RR: Gim Yeongmi
- MR: Kim Yŏngmi

Kim Yong-mi (born 14 November 1992) is a retired North Korean female volleyball player, playing as an outside hitter. She was part of the North Korea women's national volleyball team.

She participated at the 2010 Asian Games. On club level she played for Sobaeksu in 2010.
