= Youngmi Kim =

South Korean soprano opera singer (born 1954)

- Born: November 6, 1954 (age 71); Daegu, South Korea
- Education: Seoul Arts High School; Accademia Nazionale di Santa Cecilia
- Occupation: Opera singer

Korean name
- Hangul: 김영미
- RR: Gim Yeongmi
- MR: Kim Yŏngmi

Youngmi Kim (Korean: 김영미; born November 6, 1954) is a South Korean vocalist known for her performance as a soprano opera singer.

== Early life and education ==
Kim was born in Daegu, South Korea, and graduated from Yewon Middle School and Seoul Arts High School. In 1973, she entered the Accademia Nazionale di Santa Cecilia in Rome, Italy. Kim studied with Professor Jolanda Magnoni and received her master's degree in 1979.

Kim comes from a family with a long history in music. Her maternal grandfather (Ahn Ki-yong) was the first Korean musician trained at a conservatory in the United States. Ahn Ki-yong's operas (Kong-jui Pat-jui and Kyonwu-Jiknyo) were the first and the second Western-style operas ever written and produced in Korea.

== Career ==
Having studied in Rome, Kim acquired training in Italian operatic works and was the first singer of Korean birth to enter the Verona and Puccini Competitions. She performed in her first complete opera, in the role of Violetta in Verdi's La traviata, at the National Theater of Korea, Seoul in 1977, and in 1978 she performed the role of Mimi in Puccini's La Bohème at the Sejong Cultural Center in Seoul. Kim has been recognized for her beautiful voice at an early age and received many awards. She won the Maria Callas International Competition in 1980 and the Luciano Pavarotti Competition in 1981. The same year, she gave her American debut recital at the Lincoln Center in New York. In 1982, she performed in Philadelphia in Donizetti's L'elisir d'amore ("The Elixir of Love") opposite Pavarotti, who performed the role of Nemorino. Throughout the 1980s, Ms. Kim performed in numerous roles in the US. She held the title the role of Cio-Cio San in Puccini's Madama Butterfly with the Hawaii Opera Theater in March 1985 and in Los Angeles in October 1986.

As a New York City Opera member, Kim appeared as Mimi in Puccini's La Bohème. Other appearances include those at the Bastille Opera, the National Symphony in Washington DC, and the LA Philharmonic. She was also in Hawaii University's Gentio fundraising recital in 1995 and the musical Academy Kijiahna Festival in 1996. In March 1997, she performed the role of Desdemona in Verdi's Otello. In 1998, she was in Rome's Santa Cecilia Orchestra Opera for Matan’s Shooter and Tokyo at the New National Opera stage performing La traviata. She was also in Korea that year in August performing in the play Hwang Jin Yi and others. Once, she played the top and main character of Madama Butterfly in the San Diego Opera Stage.

As of 2012, she is a professor at Korea National University of Arts.

=== Voice and musicality ===
Kim is a soprano specializing in the Italian bel canto tradition of operatic singing. Because of her voice, her grounding in the Italian repertoire, and her pioneering role as a musician of Asian descent accomplished in the Western art music tradition, Young-mi Kim has been called, "the Maria Callas of the East". A master of messa di voce through breath control, she is also regarded for her musical accuracy and her tonal consistency throughout an extensive vocal range. In opera and concert performances, her musical mastery has been recognized both for its power and richness along with the professionalism of her stage manners.

=== Albums ===
Kim has released three solo albums and one book. Her albums are called Lullaby, Lullaby 2 and The world's most beautiful songs. Her first album Lullaby sold 70,000 copies upon its release in 1995 and was followed by a second volume in 1998. Other albums that include her performances are, Most popular Christian songs in Korea, Four Composers, Beautiful art songs, and World famous songs no. 1. "Yearning", "Footprints", "Lovely Deer" and "Love" are just a few of her songs.

== Awards ==
In 1977, Kim won the first prize at the Verona International Competition in Italy. In 1979, she won the first prize at Giacomo Puccini Contest, and in 1980, she was ranked one of the six best singers at Maria Callas Concours. In 1981, she won the first prize at Luciano Pavarotti Concours. In addition, she received awards in the 10th Korean Schubert Lieder Competition and the Emelie Dieterle Award. In 2003, she was chosen as a finalist in the International Baroque Singing Competition of Chimay, Belgium.

== Publications ==
In 2010, Kim published a book titled Just like Kim Youngmi, prima donna. In this autobiography, she describes how she overcame her loneliness when she was studying abroad. She recalls difficult moments throughout her life and how she endured them. She also introduces her own vocal techniques within the book.
