= Kim Young-mi (sport shooter) =

South Korean sport shooter (born 1960)

- Hangul: 김영미
- Hanja: 金榮美
- RR: Gim Yeongmi
- MR: Kim Yŏngmi

Kim Young-mi (Korean: 김영미; born 18 August 1960) is a South Korean sport shooter who competed in the 1984 Summer Olympics and in the 1988 Summer Olympics.
