= Shakey's Super League =

Women's volleyball league in the Philippines

- Upcoming season or competition: 2026 Shakey's Super League Unity Cup
- Conference: 3
- Sport: Volleyball
- Founded: 2022
- Founder: Adrian Laurel; Philip Ella Juico; Vic Gregorio
- First season: 2022
- Motto: All To Play
- No. of teams: 13 (National); 17 (Pre-season); 20 (GVIL Division 1); 24 (GVIL Division 2)
- Country: Philippines
- Continent: AVC (Asia)
- Most recent champions: UST Golden Tigresses (National Collegiate); UST Junior Golden Tigresses (National Junior's); National University (Pre-season); UST Junior Golden Tigresses (GVIL Division 1); NUNS Lady Bullpups - B (GVIL Division 2)
- Broadcaster: Solar Sports
- Streaming partner: Smart

The Shakey's Super League (SSL) is a women's volleyball league in the Philippines contested within the collegiate and high school levels. The league is organized by Shakey's Pizza Asia Ventures Inc. (SPAVI), title sponsors of the original V-League, and Athletic Events and Sports Management Group Inc. (ACES), organizers of the now-defunct Philippine Super Liga.

== History ==
=== Background ===
Shakey's Pizza's history with volleyball in the Philippines dates back to 2004 with the Shakey's V-League (SVL). Originally serving as a women's collegiate league, it would branch into semi-professional corporate-backed teams similar to the Philippine Basketball Association in 2011. In 2016, the SVL was rebranded to the now-professional Premier Volleyball League (PVL), parting ways with Shakey's. In 2022, the collegiate division of the PVL was launched separately as the V-League.

Meanwhile, the Philippine Super Liga (PSL), another volleyball league featuring corporate teams, was launched in 2013. The league, which would later be owned by Athletic Events and Sports Management Group Inc. (ACES), rivaled the SVL - and later, the PVL, but ended up ceasing operations in 2021 after all of its teams left for the rival league.

=== Launch ===
With both the SVL's reorganization and the PSL folding, ACES partnered with Shakey's (via Shakey's Pizza Asia Ventures Inc.; SPAVI) to form the Shakey's Super League on August 16, 2022. It was formally launched at Shakey's ASEANA outlet in Parañaque as a collegiate volleyball league similar to the SVL.

The SSL's inaugural tournament, the 2022 Collegiate Pre-Season Tournament, ran from September 22 to November 28, 2022. The first tournament marked the return of full pre-seasons for the UAAP and NCAA teams since they were forced to resort to tune-ups due to the disruption caused by the COVID-19 pandemic.

In May 2023, SSL launched the high school-level Girls Volleyball Invitational League (GVIL) with its inaugural edition. It was contested by teams from various associations across the country.

== League format and teams ==
The Shakey's Super League consists of three tournaments that are held annually, including two collegiate level and one high school level. The tournaments shown are listed in the order they are held in each calendar year.

=== Girls Volleyball Invitational League ===
The Shakey's Girls Volleyball Invitational League (GVIL), is the SSL's high school competition. The GVIL is the first tournament held in each calendar year and runs from May to June. Beginning with the 2025 edition, the GVIL will be divided into a two-division set-up. The higher division, Division 1, will consist of 20 teams while the lower division, Division 2, will consist of 10 teams.

==== Division 1 ====
Team	School	Association
Adamson Lady Baby Falcons	Adamson University	UAAP
Arellano Lady Braves	Arellano University	NCAA
Bacolod Tay Tung Thunderbolts	Bacolod Tay Tung High School	WVRAA
Bethel Academy Bethelites	Bethel Academy of Gen. Trias	—N/a
California Academy Cal Babies	California Academy	—N/a
Corpus Christi Lady Knights	Corpus Christi School of Cagayan De Oro	—N/a
CKSC Blue Dragons	Chiang Kai Shek College	WNCAA
DLSL Green Stallions	De La Salle Lipa	NCAA–South
DLSZ Lady Junior Archers - A	De La Salle Santiago Zobel School	UAAP
EAC Lady Brigadiers	Emilio Aguinaldo College	NCAA
FEU–D Lady Baby Tamaraws	Far Eastern University	UAAP
HRC Girls' Team	Holy Rosary College of Sta. Rosa, Laguna	—N/a
KMS Girls' Team	King's Montessori School	—N/a
Lyceum Junior Lady Pirates	Lyceum of the Philippines University – Cavite	NCAA
NCF Lady Tigers	Naga College Foundation	—N/a
NUNS Lady Bullpups	National University–Nazareth School	UAAP
SJI Falcons	St. John's Institute – Hua Ming Bacolod	NOPSSCEA
Perpetual Junior Lady Altas	University of Perpetual Help System DALTA	NCAA
UPIS Junior Fighting Maroons	University of the Philippines Integrated School	UAAP
UST Junior Tigresses	University of Santo Tomas	UAAP

==== Division 2 ====
Team	School	Association
AA Amazons	Assumption Antipolo	WNCAA
AC Aces	Assumption College San Lorenzo	WNCAA
DLSZ Lady Junior Archers - B	De La Salle Santiago Zobel School	UAAP
DIS Girls' Team	Domuschola International School	—N/a
EIA Huskies	Everest International Academy	MISAA
ICA Girls' Team	Immaculate Conception Academy–Greenhills	—N/a
LSGH Greenies	La Salle Green Hills	NCAA
Maria Katipuneras	Miriam College	WNCAA
SPCP Girls' Team	St. Paul College, Pasig	WNCAA
STC Girls' Team	Saint Theresa's College of Quezon City	—N/a

=== National Invitationals ===
The National Invitationals is the SSL's national collegiate tournament. The National Invitationals is the second tournament held in each calendar year and usually runs from July to August. Teams qualify for the tournament by either finishing in a qualifying position in their association or regional qualifier. In celebration of Shakey's 50th year anniversary, this year 2025 edition tournament will be in a three-leg nationwide tour. The SSL came up with a tour-style format to showcase the talents of provincial squads in front of their home crowd. Davao will host the first leg, with the next two legs being held in Cebu and Batangas. The Shakey's Super League (SSL) National Invitationals is inclined to continue its three-leg format in future editions after receiving positive response from participating teams and fans.

==== Mindanao Leg ====
Team	School	Association
Davao Selection	AdDU, HCDC, UM	—N/a
NDDU Lady Kingfishers	Notre Dame of Dadiangas University	—N/a
NU Lady Bulldogs	National University	UAAP
UP Fighting Maroons	University of the Philippines	UAAP

==== Visayas Leg ====
Team	School	Association
Adamson Lady Falcons	Adamson University	UAAP
Ateneo Blue Eagles	Ateneo de Manila University	UAAP
USC Lady Warriors	University of San Carlos	CESAFI
USPF Lady Panthers	University of Southern Philippines Foundation	CESAFI

==== Luzon Leg ====
Team	School	Association
Benilde Lady Blazers	De La Salle–College of Saint Benilde	NCAA
FEU Lady Tamaraws	Far Eastern University	UAAP
Letran Lady Knights	Colegio de San Juan de Letran	NCAA
UB Lady Brahmans	University of Batangas	UCAL

=== Pre-season Unity Cup ===
The Preseason Unity Cup, also known before as the Collegiate Preseason Championship, is billed by the SSL as its premier tournament. The Pre-season Unity Cup is the final tournament held in each calendar year and runs from September to November. The Shakey’s Super League Preseason Collegiate Championship is shifting to being the SSL Preseason Unity Cup. In celebration of the pizza brand’s 50th anniversary, the SSL introduced the new league name last Sept. 4 ahead of the opening of its fourth season on Sept. 20 at the Playtime Filoil Centre featuring 16 teams from the UAAP and the NCAA.

Team	School	Association
Adamson Lady Falcons	Adamson University	UAAP
Arellano Lady Chiefs	Arellano University	NCAA
Ateneo Blue Eagles	Ateneo de Manila University	UAAP
Benilde Lady Blazers	De La Salle–College of Saint Benilde	NCAA
EAC Lady Generals	Emilio Aguinaldo College	NCAA
FEU Lady Tamaraws	Far Eastern University	UAAP
JRU Lady Bombers	José Rizal University	NCAA
Letran Lady Knights	Colegio de San Juan de Letran	NCAA
Lyceum Lady Pirates	Lyceum of the Philippines University	NCAA
Mapúa Lady Cardinals	Mapúa University	NCAA
NU Lady Bulldogs	National University	UAAP
Perpetual Lady Altas	University of Perpetual Help System DALTA	NCAA
San Beda Lady Red Spikers	San Beda University	NCAA
San Sebastian Lady Stags	San Sebastian College – Recoletos	NCAA
UP Fighting Maroons	University of the Philippines	UAAP
UST Golden Tigresses	University of Santo Tomas	UAAP

== Result summary ==
=== National Invitationals ===
==== Collegiate Division ====
Year	Champions	Runners-up	Third place
2023	De La Salle Lady Spikers	Adamson Lady Falcons	UST Golden Tigresses
2024	NU Lady Bulldogs	FEU Lady Tamaraws	Benilde Lady Blazers
2025	Mindanao Leg		
2025	NU Lady Bulldogs	UP Fighting Maroons	NDDU Lady Kingfishers
2025	Visayas Leg		
2025	Adamson Lady Falcons	USC Lady Warriors	Ateneo Blue Eagles
2025	Luzon Leg		
2025	FEU Lady Tamaraws	Benilde Lady Blazers	Letran Lady Knights
2026	UST Golden Tigresses	Benilde Lady Blazers	Letran Lady Knights

==== Junior's Division ====
Year	Champions	Runners-up	Third place
2026	UST Junior Golden Tigresses	Saint John's Institute	Arellano University High School

=== Pre-season Unity Cup ===
Year	Champions	Runners-up	Third place
2022	NU Lady Bulldogs	De La Salle Lady Spikers	Adamson Lady Falcons
2023	NU Lady Bulldogs	UST Golden Tigresses	FEU Lady Tamaraws
2024	NU Lady Bulldogs	De La Salle Lady Spikers	FEU Lady Tamaraws
2025	NU Lady Bulldogs	UST Golden Tigresses	FEU Lady Tamaraws
2026	TBD		

=== Girls Volleyball Invitational League ===
==== Division 1 ====
Year	Champions	Runners-up	Third place
2023	California Academy	Naga College Foundation	Bacolod Tay Tung High School
2024	Adamson Lady Baby Falcons	Bacolod Tay Tung High School	King's Montessori School
2025	NUNS Lady Bullpups	Bacolod Tay Tung High School	De La Salle Lipa Green Stallions
2026	UST Junior Golden Tigresses	Bacolod Tay Tung High School	NUNS Lady Bullpups

==== Division 2 ====
Year	Champions	Runners-up	Third place
2025	Domuschola International School	Everest International Academy	Immaculate Conception Academy-Greenhills
2026	NUNS Lady Bullpups - B	University of Batangas High School	Bacolod Tay Tung High School - B

== Media coverage ==
As of 2025, Solar Sports has the television broadcast rights to the Shakey's Super League. Smart Communications has the streaming rights and airs the games via PusoP.

=== Former broadcast partners ===
- IBC
- CNN Philippines
- Plus Network

=== Sportscasters ===
- Anchor- Ken Pangilinan
- Anchor- Shiela Salaysay
- Anchor- Daphne Cristobal
- Anchor- Kayla Concepcion
- Anchor/Analyst- Jong Panerio
- Analyst- Gyra Barroga
- Analyst- Hollie Reyes
- Analyst-- Rea Raagas
- Analyst- Gelina Luceño
- Analyst- Kai Baloaloa
- Analyst- Ricci Cordero
- Analyst- Caitlyn Bernal
- Courtside Reporter- Sabrina San Diego
- Courtside Reporter- Mikee Abueg
- Courtside Reporter-Janine Sakall
- Courtside Reporter- Taty Austria
- Courtside Reporter- Fiona Bacani

== See also ==
- Filoil EcoOil Preseason Cup – a similar tournament for men's collegiate basketball
- NCAA volleyball championships (Philippines)
- Shakey's V-League
- UAAP volleyball championships
- V-League (Philippines)
