= 2025 Shakey's Girls Volleyball Invitational League =

2025 high school volleyball competition

- Duration: May 28 – June 7, 2025
- Teams: 30; 20 (Division 1); 10 (Division 2)

Division 1
- Champions: NUNS Lady Bullpups
- Runners-up: Bacolod Tay Tung Thunderbolts
- Third place: DLSL Green Stallions
- Fourth place: EAC Lady Brigadiers
- MVP: Samantha Cantada
- Best OH: Rhose Viane Almendralejo
- Best MB: Amor Bartolome
- Best OPP: Harlyn Serneche
- Best Setter: Jan Rose Bulak
- Best Libero: Rhea May Tomas

Division 2
- Champions: DIS Badgers
- Runners-up: EIA Huskies
- Third place: ICA Girls' Team
- Fourth place: SPCP Jaguars
- Promoted to D1: DIS Badgers; EIA Huskies
- MVP: Naihma Banal
- Best OH: Andreanne Tsai
- Best MB: Naihma Banal
- Best OPP: Anna Mikaela Pingris
- Best Setter: Wrean Janeen Ng
- Best Libero: Jania Legaspi

SGVIL chronology
- < 2024 2026 >

SSL tournament chronology
- < 2024 Pre-season 2025 National >

The 2025 Shakey's Girls Volleyball Invitational League (Note: The full name of the tournament is the 2025 Shakey's Girls Volleyball Invitational League Rising Star Cup.) was the third edition of the high school competition organized by the Shakey's Super League and the first SSL tournament of 2025. It is also the first GVIL to be split into two divisions, with 20 teams taking part in Division 1 and 10 teams in Division 2. The tournament started on May 28 to June 7, 2025 at La Salle Green Hills Gym in Mandaluyong.

The Adamson Lady Baby Falcons entered this tournament as the defending GVIL Division 1 champions.

In Division 1, the tournament was won by the NUNS Lady Bullpups, after defeating the Bacolod Tay Tung Thunderbolts in a five-set championship match. Meanwhile, the DIS Badgers beat the EIA Huskies in straight sets to win Division 2. DIS and EIA are promoted to Division 1 for 2026.

== Venues ==
Preliminary round
Mandaluyong
La Salle Green Hills Gym

== Format ==
General

- The preliminary rounds and quarterfinals will be played in best-of-three sets while the semifinals and finals will be played in best-of-five.
- The final set of each match is played up to 25 points as opposed to 15 in most competitions.

Preliminary round

- Teams are divided into pools of five (four pools in Division 1; two pools in Division 2).
- Each team will play in a single round-robin tournament against teams in the same pool. Each team will play a total of four matches.
- Teams are ranked using the FIVB Ranking System.

Final round

- In Division 1, the top two teams from each pool advance to the final round. In Division 2, the top four in each pool advance to the final round.
- The top two teams in Division 2 will be promoted to Division 1 in 2026.

== Pool standing procedure ==
- First, teams are ranked by the number of matches won.
- If the number of matches won is tied, the tied teams are then ranked by match points, wherein:
  - Match won 2–0: 3 match points for the winner, 0 match points for the loser.
  - Match won 2–1: 2 match points for the winner, 1 match point for the loser.
- In case of any further ties, the following criteria shall be used:
  - Set ratio: the number of sets won divided by number of sets lost.
  - Point ratio: number of points scored divided by number of points allowed.
  - Head-to-head standings: any remaining tied teams are ranked based on the results of head-to-head matches involving the teams in question.

== Division 1 ==
=== Teams ===
The 20 teams assigned to Division 1 include the 18 teams from the previous GVIL and two new teams: Corpus Christi Lady Knights and SJI Falcons.

Team	School	Association
Adamson Lady Baby Falcons	Adamson University	UAAP
Arellano Lady Braves	Arellano University	NCAA
Bacolod Tay Tung Thunderbolts	Bacolod Tay Tung High School	WVRAA
Bethel Academy Bethelites	Bethel Academy of Gen. Trias	—N/a
California Academy Cal Babies	California Academy	—N/a
Corpus Christi Lady Knights	Corpus Christi School of Cagayan De Oro	—N/a
CKSC Blue Dragons	Chiang Kai Shek College	WNCAA
DLSL Green Stallions	De La Salle Lipa	NCAA–South
DLSZ Lady Junior Archers - A	De La Salle Santiago Zobel School	UAAP
EAC Lady Brigadiers	Emilio Aguinaldo College	NCAA
FEU–D Lady Baby Tamaraws	Far Eastern University	UAAP
HRC Girls' Team	Holy Rosary College of Sta. Rosa, Laguna	—N/a
KMS Lady Vikings	King's Montessori School	—N/a
Lyceum Junior Lady Pirates	Lyceum of the Philippines University – Cavite	NCAA
NCF Lady Tigers	Naga College Foundation	—N/a
NUNS Lady Bullpups	National University–Nazareth School	UAAP
SJI Falcons	St. John's Institute – Hua Ming Bacolod	NOPSSCEA
Perpetual Junior Lady Altas	University of Perpetual Help System DALTA	NCAA
UPIS Junior Fighting Maroons	University of the Philippines Integrated School	UAAP
UST Junior Tigresses	University of Santo Tomas	UAAP

=== Pool composition ===
Each Division 1 pool is sponsored by a different product from the Shakey's Group.

Pool A Shakey's Pizza	Pool B Peri-Peri	Pool C R&B Tea	Pool D Potato Corner
Adamson Lady Baby Falcons	Bacolod Tay Tung Thunderbolts	KMS Lady Vikings	NUNS Lady Bullpups
Lyceum Junior Lady Pirates	Bethel Academy Bethelites	Arellano Lady Braves	FEU–D Lady Baby Tamaraws
NCF Lady Tigers	DLSL Green Stallions	Corpus Christi Lady Knights	SJI Falcons
EAC Lady Brigadiers	CKSC Blue Dragons	California Academy Cal Babies	UPIS Junior Fighting Maroons
Perpetual Junior Lady Altas	HRC Girls' Team	DLSZ Junior Lady Spikers - A	UST Junior Tigresses

=== Preliminary round ===
- All times are Philippine Standard Time (UTC+8:00).
- The top two teams per pool advance to the quarterfinal round.

==== Pool A ====
Pos	Team	Pld	W	L	Pts	SW	SL	SR	SPW	SPL	SPR	Qualification
1	EAC Lady Brigadiers	4	4	0	8	12	8	1.500	241	151	1.596	Quarterfinals
2	Adamson Lady Baby Falcons	4	3	1	7	11	9	1.222	207	205	1.010	Quarterfinals
3	Lyceum Junior Lady Pirates	4	2	2	4	8	10	0.800	186	203	0.916	
4	Perpetual Junior Lady Altas	4	1	3	2	6	11	0.545	124	219	0.566	
5	NCF Lady Tigers	4	0	4	3	7	12	0.583	229	259	0.884	

First match(es) will be played: May 28, 2025. Source:

Date	Time	Venue		Score		Set 1	Set 2	Set 3	Total	Report
May 28	13:00	LSGH Court 2	Lyceum Junior Lady Pirates	2–0	Perpetual Junior Lady Altas	25–18	25–21		50–39	
May 28	17:00	LSGH Court 1	Adamson Lady Baby Falcons	1–2	EAC Lady Brigadiers	15–25	25–19	17–25	57–69	
May 29	13:00	LSGH Court 1	Perpetual Junior Lady Altas	0–2	Adamson Lady Baby Falcons	4–25	12–25		16–50	
May 30	15:00	LSGH Court 2	EAC Lady Brigadiers	2–0	Lyceum Junior Lady Pirates	25–19	25–17		50–36	
May 31	09:00	LSGH Court 1	Adamson Lady Baby Falcons	2–0	Lyceum Junior Lady Pirates	25–18	25–14		50–32	
May 31	15:00	LSGH Court 2	EAC Lady Brigadiers	2–0	Perpetual Junior Lady Altas	25–0	25–0		50–0	
June 2	09:00	LSGH Court 2	NCF Lady Tigers	1–2	Lyceum Junior Lady Pirates	25–18	20–25	19–25	64–68	
June 2	17:00	LSGH Court 2	EAC Lady Brigadiers	2–1	NCF Lady Tigers	22–25	25–16	25–17	72–58	
June 3	11:00	LSGH Court 2	Adamson Lady Baby Falcons	2–0	NCF Lady Tigers	25–16	25–22		50–38	
June 3	17:00	LSGH Court 1	NCF Lady Tigers	1–2	Perpetual Junior Lady Altas	21–25	25–19	23–25	69–69	

==== Pool B ====
Pos	Team	Pld	W	L	Pts	SW	SL	SR	SPW	SPL	SPR	Qualification
1	Bacolod Tay Tung Thunderbolts	4	4	0	8	12	8	1.500	200	121	1.653	Quarterfinals
2	DLSL Green Stallions	4	3	1	6	10	9	1.111	186	191	0.974	Quarterfinals
3	CKSC Blue Dragons	4	2	2	4	8	10	0.800	162	179	0.905	
4	Bethel Academy Bethelites	4	1	3	2	6	11	0.545	166	220	0.755	
5	HRC Girls' Team	4	0	4	1	5	12	0.417	188	219	0.858	

First match(es) will be played: May 28, 2025. Source:

Date	Time	Venue		Score		Set 1	Set 2	Set 3	Total	Report
May 28	11:00	LSGH Court 2	Bethel Academy Bethelites	0–2	CKSC Blue Dragons	15–25	22–25		37–50	
May 29	11:00	LSGH Court 1	Bethel Academy Bethelites	2–1	HRC Girls' Team	26–24	18–25	25–21	69–70	
May 30	13:00	LSGH Court 2	CKSC Blue Dragons	2–0	HRC Girls' Team	25–21	25–21		50–42	
June 2	09:00	LSGH Court 1	Bethel Academy Bethelites	0–2	Bacolod Tay Tung Thunderbolts	14–25	16–25		30–50	
June 2	11:00	LSGH Court 1	DLSL Green Stallions	2–0	CKSC Blue Dragons	25–17	25–17		50–34	
June 2	15:00	LSGH Court 1	Bacolod Tay Tung Thunderbolts	2–0	DLSL Green Stallions	25–18	25–18		50–36	
June 3	09:00	LSGH Court 1	HRC Girls' Team	0–2	Bacolod Tay Tung Thunderbolts	17–25	22–25		39–50	
June 3	11:00	LSGH Court 1	DLSL Green Stallions	2–0	Bethel Academy Bethelites	25–15	25–15		50–30	
June 3	15:00	LSGH Court 1	Bacolod Tay Tung Thunderbolts	2–0	CKSC Blue Dragons	25–16	25–11		50–27	
June 3	17:00	LSGH Court 2	DLSL Green Stallions	2–0	HRC Girls' Team	25–19	25–18		50–37	

==== Pool C ====
Pos	Team	Pld	W	L	Pts	SW	SL	SR	SPW	SPL	SPR	Qualification
1	Arellano Lady Braves	4	4	0	8	12	8	1.500	240	191	1.257	Quarterfinals
2	KMS Lady Vikings	4	3	1	7	11	9	1.222	225	182	1.236	Quarterfinals
3	California Academy Cal Babies	4	2	2	5	9	10	0.900	225	255	0.882	
4	DLSZ Lady Junior Archers – A	4	1	3	3	7	11	0.636	213	241	0.884	
5	Corpus Christi Lady Knights	4	0	4	1	5	12	0.417	215	219	0.982	

First match(es) will be played: May 28, 2025. Source:

Date	Time	Venue		Score		Set 1	Set 2	Set 3	Total	Report
May 28	13:00	LSGH Court 1	KMS Lady Vikings	1–2	Arellano Lady Braves	19–25	25–16	25–27	69–68	
May 29	09:00	LSGH Court 2	KMS Lady Vikings	2–0	Corpus Christi Lady Knights	25–16	25–12		50–28	
May 30	11:00	LSGH Court 1	California Academy Cal Babies	0–2	KMS Lady Vikings	18–25	25–27		43–52	
May 30	13:00	LSGH Court 1	Corpus Christi Lady Knights	1–2	DLSZ Lady Junior Archers – A	20–25	25–19	21–25	66–69	
May 31	09:00	LSGH Court 2	California Academy Cal Babies	1–2	Arellano Lady Braves	25–20	25–27	11–25	61–72	
May 31	11:00	LSGH Court 2	DLSZ Lady Junior Archers – A	0–2	KMS Lady Vikings	16–25	27–29		43–54	
May 31	13:00	LSGH Court 1	Corpus Christi Lady Knights	0–2	California Academy Cal Babies	22–25	21–25		43–50	
June 2	13:00	LSGH Court 1	Arellano Lady Braves	2–0	Corpus Christi Lady Knights	25–13	25–15		50–28	
June 2	13:00	LSGH Court 2	DLSZ Lady Junior Archers – A	1–2	California Academy Cal Babies	25–21	21–25	22–25	68–71	
June 3	15:00	LSGH Court 2	Arellano Lady Braves	2–0	DLSZ Lady Junior Archers – A	25–15	25–18		50–33	

==== Pool D ====
Pos	Team	Pld	W	L	Pts	SW	SL	SR	SPW	SPL	SPR	Qualification
1	NUNS Lady Bullpups	4	4	0	8	12	8	1.500	200	144	1.389	Quarterfinals
2	FEU–D Lady Baby Tamaraws	4	3	1	6	10	9	1.111	215	180	1.194	Quarterfinals
3	UST Junior Tigresses	4	2	2	5	9	10	0.900	232	224	1.036	
4	SJI Falcons	4	1	3	3	7	11	0.636	196	215	0.912	
5	UPIS Junior Fighting Maroons	4	0	4	0	4	12	0.333	128	200	0.640	

First match(es) will be played: May 28, 2025. Source:

Date	Time	Venue		Score		Set 1	Set 2	Set 3	Total	Report
May 28	09:00	LSGH Court 2	UPIS Junior Fighting Maroons	0–2	FEU–D Lady Baby Tamaraws	9–25	12–25		21–50	
May 28	15:00	LSGH Court 1	SJI Falcons	1–2	UST Junior Tigresses	20–25	29–27	19–25	68–77	
May 29	09:00	LSGH Court 1	UST Junior Tigresses	2–0	UPIS Junior Fighting Maroons	25–20	25–13		50–33	
May 29	11:00	LSGH Court 2	FEU–D Lady Baby Tamaraws	2–0	SJI Falcons	25–21	25–20		50–41	
May 30	17:00	LSGH Court 1	FEU–D Lady Baby Tamaraws	2–1	UST Junior Tigresses	23–25	25–22	25–21	73–68	
May 31	17:00	LSGH Court 2	SJI Falcons	2–0	UPIS Junior Fighting Maroons	25–16	25–22		50–38	
June 2	11:00	LSGH Court 2	NUNS Lady Bullpups	2–0	FEU–D Lady Baby Tamaraws	25–19	25–23		50–42	
June 2	17:00	LSGH Court 1	SJI Falcons	1–2	NUNS Lady Bullpups	23–25	14–25		37–50	
June 3	13:00	LSGH Court 1	UPIS Junior Fighting Maroons	0–2	NUNS Lady Bullpups	18–25	10–25		28–50	
June 3	19:00	LSGH Court 1	NUNS Lady Bullpups	2–0	UST Junior Tigresses	25–14	25–23		50–37	

=== Final round ===
5th place match
June 7
Adamson Lady Baby Falcons	3
FEU–D Lady Baby Tamaraws	2
7th place match
June 7
KMS Lady Vikings	0
Arellano Lady Braves	3

5th–8th semifinals
June 6
KMS Lady Vikings
Adamson Lady Baby Falcons
June 6
FEU–D Lady Baby Tamaraws
Arellano Lady Braves

Quarterfinals
June 5
A1	EAC Lady Brigadiers	2
C2	KMS Lady Vikings	0
June 5
D1	NUNS Lady Bullpups	2
A2	Adamson Lady Baby Falcons	0
June 5
B1	Bacolod Tay Tung Thunderbolts	2
D2	FEU–D Lady Baby Tamaraws	0
June 5
C1	Arellano Lady Braves	1
B2	DLSL Green Stallions	2

Semifinals
June 6
EAC Lady Brigadiers	0
NUNS Lady Bullpups	3
June 6
Bacolod Tay Tung Thunderbolts	3
DLSL Green Stallions	0

Championship
June 7
NUNS Lady Bullpups	3
Bacolod Tay Tung Thunderbolts	2
3rd place match
June 7
EAC Lady Brigadiers	0
DLSL Green Stallions	3

=== Quarterfinals ===
Date	Time	Venue		Score		Set 1	Set 2	Set 3	Total	Report
June 5	09:00	LSGH Court 2	EAC Lady Brigadiers	2–0	KMS Lady Vikings	25–22	25–16		50–38	
June 5	11:00	LSGH Court 2	Arellano Lady Braves	1–2	DLSL Green Stallions	23–25	25–17	19–25	67–67	
June 5	13:00	LSGH Court 1	NUNS Lady Bullpups	2–0	Adamson Lady Baby Falcons	25–13	25–22		50–35	
June 5	15:00	LSGH Court 1	Bacolod Tay Tung Thunderbolts	2–0	FEU–D Lady Baby Tamaraws	25–22	27–25		52–47	

=== 5th–8th semifinals ===
Date	Time	Venue		Score		Set 1	Set 2	Set 3	Set 4	Set 5	Total	Report
June 6	13:00	LSGH Court 2	Adamson Lady Baby Falcons	–	KMS Lady Vikings	–	–	–			0–0	
June 6	15:00	LSGH Court 2	FEU–D Lady Baby Tamaraws	–	Arellano Lady Braves	–	–	–			0–0	

=== 7th place match ===
Date	Time	Venue		Score		Set 1	Set 2	Set 3	Set 4	Set 5	Total	Report
June 7	13:00	LSGH Court 2	KMS Lady Vikings	0–3	Arellano Lady Braves	0–25	0–25	0–25			0–75	

=== 5th place match ===
Date	Time	Venue		Score		Set 1	Set 2	Set 3	Set 4	Set 5	Total	Report
June 7	15:00	LSGH Court 2	Adamson Lady Baby Falcons	3–2	FEU–D Lady Baby Tamaraws	24–26	21–25	25–18	35–33	17–15	122–117	

=== Semifinals ===
Date	Time	Venue		Score		Set 1	Set 2	Set 3	Set 4	Set 5	Total	Report
June 6	13:00	LSGH Court 1	NUNS Lady Bullpups	3–0	EAC Lady Brigadiers	25–16	25–15	25–11			75–42	
June 6	15:00	LSGH Court 1	Bacolod Tay Tung Thunderbolts	3–0	DLSL Green Stallions	25–20	25–15	25–18			75–53	

=== 3rd place match ===
Date	Time	Venue		Score		Set 1	Set 2	Set 3	Set 4	Set 5	Total	Report
June 7	11:00	LSGH Court 1	EAC Lady Brigadiers	0–3	DLSL Green Stallions	22–25	12–25	20–25			54–75	

=== Championship match ===
Date	Time	Venue		Score		Set 1	Set 2	Set 3	Set 4	Set 5	Total	Report
June 7	15:00	LSGH Court 1	NUNS Lady Bullpups	3–2	Bacolod Tay Tung Thunderbolts	27–25	16–25	21–25	30–28	15–13	109–116	

=== Final standings ===
Rank	Team
1st place, gold medalist(s)	NUNS Lady Bullpups
2nd place, silver medalist(s)	Bacolod Tay Tung Thunderbolt
3rd place, bronze medalist(s)	DLSL Green Stallions
4	EAC Lady Brigadiers
5	Adamson Lady Baby Falcons
6	FEU–D Lady Baby Tamaraws
7	Arellano Lady Braves
8	KMS Lady Vikings
9	UST Junior Tigresses
10	California Academy Cal Babies
11	Lyceum Junior Lady Pirates
12	CKSC Blue Dragons
13	SJI Falcons
14	DLSZ Lady Junior Archers - A
15	Bethel Academy Bethelites
16	Perpetual Junior Lady Altas
17	NCF Lady Tigers
18	Corpus Christi Lady Knights
19	HRC Girls' Team
20	UPIS Junior Fighting Maroons

2025 Shakey's Girls Volleyball Invitational League champions
NUNS Lady Bullpups
1st title

Team Roster
Harlyn Serneche (c), Samantha Chloey Cantada, Denesse Daylisan, Raine Gabrielle Alonzo, Diza Marie Berayo, Samantha Nicole Coja, Ghenievib Belen, Jenelyn Jacob, Slash Nicole Obera, Atasha Anne Doroja, Olusayemisi Deborah Olatunji, Sophia Esmundo, Lyzel Kate Dela Peña, Ysabella Patricia Cruz, Rihanna Cris Navarro, Adeleine Terese Agustin, Cheska Rizelle Peñol, Xyz Ellen Rayco
Head coach
Karl Dimaculangan

=== Individual awards ===
Award	Player	Team	Ref.
Most Valuable Player	Samantha Cantada	NUNS	
Best Outside Spiker	Rhose Viane Almendralejo	Bacolod Tay Tung	
Best Middle Blocker	Amor Bartolome	Bacolod Tay Tung	
Best Opposite Spiker	Harlyn Serneche	NUNS	
Best Setter	Jan Rose Bulak	Bacolod Tay Tung	
Best Libero	Rhea May Tomas	Bacolod Tay Tung	

=== Medalists ===
Gold	Silver	Bronze
NUNS Lady Bullpups: Harlyn Serneche (c); Samantha Chloey Cantanda; Denesse Daylisan; Raine Gabrielle Alonzo; Diza Marie Berayo; Samantha Nicole Coja; Ghenievib Belen; Jenelyn Jacob; Slash Nicole Obera; Atasha Anne Doroja; Olusayemisi Deborah Olatunji; Sophia Esmundo; Lyzel Kate Dela Peña; Ysabella Patricia Cruz; Rihanna Cris Navarro; Adeleine Terese Agustin; Cheska Rizelle Peñol; Xyz Ellen Rayco Head Coach: Karl Dimaculangan	Bacolod Tay Tung Thunderbolts: Dona Mae De Leon (c); Ana Ysabelle Hermosura; Alexa Bertolano; Janiela Fabela; Jan Rose Bulak; Remiah Caitlin Espinosa; Rhose Viane Almendralejo; Czarina Marcella Dosayla; Edz Karylle Escultura; Camila Amor Bartolome; Ana Francessca Hermosura; Abigael Jirah Labajo; Jhaennine Mayang; Joenil Anne Ramos; Briana Nikola Ang; Rhea May Tomas Head Coach: Ian Macariola	DLSL Green Stallions: Danielle Kyle Marie Aldovino (c); Adrina Mickela Guinto; Alliah Nadine Humirang; Aleja Mae Sales; Kashmira Anika Miranda; Allyza Joyce Lescano; Sandra Gavrielle Ramirez; Maezen De Silva; Erika Libang; Althea Joy Dacer; Athena Lianne Dacer; Sofia Marie Isabelle De Castro; Victoria Allaine Atienza; Raizah Nicole Mamailao; Althea Feliss Sumague; Gharie Maxine Sumagaysay; Queen Nicke Estole; Ariane Kiel Olbes Head Coach: Imelda Mendoza

== Division 2 ==
=== Teams ===
Team	School	Association
AA Amazons	Assumption Antipolo	WNCAA
AC Aces	Assumption College San Lorenzo	WNCAA
DLSZ Lady Junior Archers - B	De La Salle Santiago Zobel School	UAAP
DIS Badgers	Domuschola International School	—N/a
ICA Girls' Team	Immaculate Conception Academy–Greenhills	—N/a
EIA Huskies	Everest International Academy	MISAA
LSGH Greenies	La Salle Green Hills	NCAA
MC Maria Katipuneras	Miriam College	WNCAA
SPCP Jaguars	St. Paul College, Pasig	WNCAA
STC Girls' Team	Saint Theresa's College of Quezon City	—N/a

=== Pool composition ===
Pool E	Pool F
LSGH Greenies	AA Amazons
MC Maria Katipuneras	SPCP Jaguars
DLSZ Lady Junior Archers - B	STC Girls' Team
EIA Huskies	DIS Badgers
AC Aces	ICA Girls' Team

=== Preliminary round ===
- All times are Philippine Standard Time (UTC+8:00).
- The top four teams per pool advance to the quarterfinal round.

==== Pool E ====
Pos	Team	Pld	W	L	Pts	SW	SL	SR	SPW	SPL	SPR	Qualification
1	LSGH Greenies	4	3	1	7	11	9	1.222	218	172	1.267	Quarterfinals
2	EIA Huskies	4	3	1	6	10	9	1.111	219	176	1.244	Quarterfinals
3	DLSZ Lady Junior Archers – B	4	2	2	5	9	10	0.900	196	162	1.210	Quarterfinals
4	MC Maria Katipuneras	4	1	3	3	7	11	0.636	174	237	0.734	Quarterfinals
5	AC Aces	4	1	3	2	6	11	0.545	155	215	0.721	

First match(es) will be played: May 28, 2025. Source:

Date	Time	Venue		Score		Set 1	Set 2	Set 3	Total	Report
May 28	09:00	LSGH Court 1	AC Aces	0–2	LSGH Greenies	13–25	11–25		24–50	
May 28	17:00	LSGH Court 2	MC Maria Katipuneras	0–2	DLSZ Lady Junior Archers – B	0–25	0–25		0–50	
May 29	13:00	LSGH Court 2	DLSZ Lady Junior Archers – B	2–0	AC Aces	25–21	25–18		50–39	
May 29	15:00	LSGH Court 2	LSGH Greenies	2–0	EIA Huskies	25–24	25–22		50–46	
May 30	11:00	LSGH Court 2	EIA Huskies	2–1	DLSZ Lady Junior Archers – B	25–15	23–25	25–2	73–42	
May 30	15:00	LSGH Court 1	MC Maria Katipuneras	1–2	AC Aces	25–19	18–25	22–25	65–69	
May 31	11:00	LSGH Court 1	AC Aces	0–2	EIA Huskies	7–25	16–25		23–50	
May 31	15:00	LSGH Court 2	DLSZ Lady Junior Archers – B	0–2	LSGH Greenies	21–25	15–25		36–50	
June 2	15:00	LSGH Court 2	MC Maria Katipuneras	2–1	LSGH Greenies	25–23	16–25	25–20	66–68	
June 3	13:00	LSGH Court 2	EIA Huskies	2–0	MC Maria Katipuneras	25–20	25–23		50–43	

==== Pool F ====
Pos	Team	Pld	W	L	Pts	SW	SL	SR	SPW	SPL	SPR	Qualification
1	ICA Girls' Team	4	3	1	7	11	9	1.222	219	147	1.490	Quarterfinals
2	DIS Badgers	4	3	1	7	11	9	1.222	264	253	1.043	Quarterfinals
3	AA Amazons	4	2	2	4	8	10	0.800	190	211	0.900	Quarterfinals
4	SPCP Jaguars	4	1	3	3	7	11	0.636	175	210	0.833	Quarterfinals
5	STC Girls' Team	4	1	3	3	7	11	0.636	210	227	0.925	

First match(es) will be played: May 28, 2025. Source:

Date	Time	Venue		Score		Set 1	Set 2	Set 3	Total	Report
May 28	11:00	LSGH Court 1	DIS Badgers	2–1	STC Girls' Team	13–25	25–20	29–27	67–72	
May 28	15:00	LSGH Court 2	ICA Girls' Team	2–0	AA Amazons	25–14	25–19		50–33	
May 29	15:00	LSGH Court 1	ICA Girls' Team	1–2	DIS Badgers	21–25	25–20	23–25	69–70	
May 29	17:00	LSGH Court 1	SPCP Jaguars	2–0	AA Amazons	25–23	25–15		50–38	
May 30	09:00	LSGH Court 1	DIS Badgers	1–2	AA Amazons	21–25	25–19	21–25	67–69	
May 30	17:00	LSGH Court 2	STC Girls' Team	2–1	SPCP Jaguars	22–25	25–15	25–20	72–60	
May 31	13:00	LSGH Court 2	STC Girls' Team	0–2	AA Amazons	23–25	21–25		44–50	
May 31	17:00	LSGH Court 2	SPCP Jaguars	0–2	ICA Girls' Team	9–25	13–25		22–50	
June 3	09:00	LSGH Court 2	SPCP Jaguars	0–2	DIS Badgers	18–25	25–27		43–52	
June 3	19:00	LSGH Court 2	ICA Girls' Team	2–0	STC Girls' Team	25–9	25–13		50–22	

=== Final round ===
5th place match
June 7
DLSZ Lady Junior Archers - B	3
AA Amazons	1
7th place match
June 7
LSGH Greenies	3
MC Maria Katipuneras	1

5th–8th semifinals
June 6
LSGH Greenies	1
DLSZ Lady Junior Archers - B	3
June 6
MC Maria Katipuneras	1
AA Amazons	3

Quarterfinals
June 5
E1	LSGH Greenies	0
F4	SPCP Jaguars	2
June 5
F2	DIS Badgers	2
E3	DLSZ Lady Junior Archers - B	1
June 5
F1	ICA Girls' Team	2
E4	MC Maria Katipuneras	0
June 5
E2	EIA Huskies	2
F3	AA Amazons	0

Semifinals
June 6
SPCP Jaguars	0
DIS Badgers	3
June 6
ICA Girls' Team	0
EIA Huskies	3

Championship
June 7
DIS Badgers	3
EIA Huskies	0
3rd place match
June 7
SPCP Jaguars	0
ICA Girls' Team	3

=== Quarterfinals ===
Date	Time	Venue		Score		Set 1	Set 2	Set 3	Total	Report
June 5	09:00	LSGH Court 1	ICA Girls' Team	2–0	MC Maria Katipuneras	25–19	25–20		50–39	
June 5	11:00	LSGH Court 1	LSGH Greenies	0–2	SPCP Jaguars	17–25	22–25		39–50	
June 5	13:00	LSGH Court 2	DIS Badgers	2–1	DLSZ Lady Junior Archers - B	25–19	11–25	25–13	61–57	
June 5	15:00	LSGH Court 2	EIA Huskies	2–0	AA Amazons	25–20	25–22		50–42	

=== 5th–8th semifinals ===
Date	Time	Venue		Score		Set 1	Set 2	Set 3	Set 4	Set 5	Total	Report
June 6	09:00	LSGH Court 2	LSGH Greenies	1–3	DLSZ Lady Junior Archers - B	25–11	14–25	17–25	26–28		82–89	
June 6	11:00	LSGH Court 2	AA Amazons	3–1	MC Maria Katipuneras	11–25	25–23	27–25	25–14		88–87	

=== 7th place match ===
Date	Time	Venue		Score		Set 1	Set 2	Set 3	Set 4	Set 5	Total	Report
June 7	09:00	LSGH Court 2	LSGH Greenies	3–1	MC Maria Katipuneras	25–23	15–25	25–20	25–19		90–87	

=== 5th place match ===
Date	Time	Venue		Score		Set 1	Set 2	Set 3	Set 4	Set 5	Total	Report
June 7	11:00	LSGH Court 2	DLSZ Lady Junior Archers - B	3–1	AA Amazons	13–25	25–16	25–17	25–22		88–80	

=== Semifinals ===
Date	Time	Venue		Score		Set 1	Set 2	Set 3	Set 4	Set 5	Total	Report
June 6	09:00	LSGH Court 1	ICA Girls' Team	0–3	EIA Huskies	29–31	8–25	13–25			50–81	
June 6	11:00	LSGH Court 1	SPCP Jaguars	0–3	DIS Badgers	23–25	12–25	20–25			55–75	

=== 3rd place match ===
Date	Time	Venue		Score		Set 1	Set 2	Set 3	Set 4	Set 5	Total	Report
June 7	09:00	LSGH Court 1	ICA Girls' Team	3–0	SPCP Jaguars	25–12	25–14	25–16			75–42	

=== Championship match ===
Date	Time	Venue		Score		Set 1	Set 2	Set 3	Set 4	Set 5	Total	Report
June 7	13:00	LSGH Court 1	EIA Huskies	0–3	DIS Badgers	11–25	24–26	17–25			52–76	

=== Final standings ===
Rank	Team
1st place, gold medalist(s)	DIS Badgers
2nd place, silver medalist(s)	EIA Huskies
3rd place, bronze medalist(s)	ICA Girls' Team
4	SPCP Jaguars
5	DLSZ Lady Junior Archers - B
6	AA Amazons
7	LSGH Greenies
8	MC Maria Katipuneras
9	STC Girls' Team
10	AC Aces

Qualified for the Division 1 2026 SGVIL

Team Roster
TBA
Head coach
TBA

=== Individual awards ===
Award	Player	Team	Ref.
Most Valuable Player	Naihma Banal	Domuschola	
Best Outside Spiker	Andreanne Tsai	ICA-Greenhills	
Best Middle Blocker	Naihma Banal	Domuschola	
Best Opposite Spiker	Anna Mikaela Pingris	Domuschola	
Best Setter	Wrean Janeen Ng	Everest	
Best Libero	Jania Legaspi	ICA-Greenhills	

=== Medalists ===
Gold	Silver	Bronze
