= 2024 Shakey's Girls Volleyball Invitational League =

2024 collegiate volleyball competition

- Duration: May 29 – June 9, 2024
- Teams: 18

Results
- Champions: Adamson Lady Baby Falcons
- Runners-up: Bacolod Tay Tung Thunderbolts
- Third place: King's Montessori School Lady Vikings
- Fourth place: NUNS Lady Bullpups

Awards
- MVP: Shaina Marie Nitura
- Best OH: Rhose Viane Almendralejo; Samantha Cantada
- Best MB: Lhouriz Tuddao; Ma. Robielle Silla
- Best OPP: Abegail Segui
- Best Setter: Felicity Sagaysay
- Best Libero: Rhea May Tomas

SGVIL chronology
- < 2023 2025 >

SSL tournament chronology
- < 2023 Pre-season 2024 National >

The 2024 Shakey's Girls Volleyball Invitational League was the second edition of the high school competition organized by the Shakey's Super League and the first SSL tournament of 2024. The tournament started on May 29, 2024, at Adamson University Gym, Ermita, Manila. It features 18 high school teams from different schools.

Adamson Lady Baby Falcons dominated Bacolod Tay Tung High School (3–0) in the championship match and was crowned as the champions of the tournament. Bacolod Tay Tung High School settled for silver. King's Montessori School won the bronze after a thrilling 4 sets victory against NU Bullpups in the 3rd place match.

== Participating teams ==
The following are teams that entered at the Girls Volleyball Invitational League (SVIL).

Team	School	Collegiate league
Adamson Lady Baby Falcons	Adamson University	UAAP
Arellano Lady Braves	Arellano University	NCAA
Bacolod Tay Tung Thunderbolts	Bacolod Tay Tung High School	—
Bethel Academy Bethelites	Bethel Academy of Gen. Trias	—
California Academy Cal Babies	California Precision Sports	—
CKSC Blue Dragons	Chiang Kai Shek College	WNCAA
DLSL Green Stallions	De La Salle Lipa	—
DLSZ Junior Lady Spikers	De La Salle Santiago Zobel School	UAAP
EAC Lady Brigadiers	Emilio Aguinaldo College	NCAA
FEU–D Lady Baby Tamaraws	Far Eastern University	UAAP
HRC Girls' Team	Holy Rosary College of Sta. Rosa, Laguna	—
KMS Lady Vikings	King's Montessori School	—
Lyceum Junior Lady Pirates	Lyceum of the Philippines University – Cavite	NCAA
NCF Lady Tigers	Naga College Foundation	—
NUNS Lady Bullpups	National University–Nazareth School	UAAP
Perpetual Junior Lady Altas	University of Perpetual Help System DALTA	NCAA
UPIS Junior Fighting Maroons	University of the Philippines Integrated School	UAAP
UST Junior Tigresses	University of Santo Tomas	UAAP

== Pool composition ==
The teams are grouped via casting lots. Pool A & Pool B will have 5 teams and Pool C & Pool D will have 4 teams.

Pool A Potato Corner	Pool B R 'n B	Pool C Peri-Peri	Pool D Shakey's
California Academy Cal Babies	NCF Lady Tigers	Bacolod Tay Tung Thunderbolts	NUNS Lady Bullpups
DLSL Green Stallions	FEU–D Lady Baby Tamaraws	UST Junior Tigresses	Adamson Lady Baby Falcons
Bethel Academy Bethelites	EAC Lady Brigadiers	KMS Lady Vikings	HRC Girls' Team
CKSC Blue Dragons	Arellano Lady Braves	Perpetual Junior Lady Altas	UPIS Junior Fighting Maroons
Lyceum Junior Lady Pirates	DLSZ Junior Lady Spikers		

== Venues ==
Preliminaries, Semifinals	Preliminary round
Manila	Sampaloc
Paco Arena	Arellano University Gym
Capacity: 1,000	Capacity: N/A
Preliminaries, Finals
Ermita
Adamson University Gym
Capacity: N/A

== Format ==
The preliminary rounds will be played in best of three sets. The semifinals and finals will be played in best of five sets.

First round

1. Single-round robin format; 4 pools; Teams are ranked using the FIVB Ranking System.
2. The top two teams per pool will advance to the second round.

Quarterfinals (knockout stage)

1. QF1: A1 vs. C2
2. QF3: C1 vs. B2
3. QF2: B1 vs. D2
4. QF4: D1 vs. A2

Semifinals (knockout stage)

1. SF1: QF #1 vs. QF #3
2. SF2: QF #2 vs. QF #4

Finals (knockout stage)

1. Bronze medal: SF1 Loser vs SF2 Loser
2. Gold medal: SF1 Winner vs SF2 Winner

== Pool standing procedure ==
- First, teams are ranked by the number of matches won.
- If the number of matches won is tied, the tied teams are then ranked by match points, wherein:
  - Match won 2–0: 3 match points for the winner, 0 match points for the loser.
  - Match won 2–1: 2 match points for the winner, 1 match point for the loser.
- In case of any further ties, the following criteria shall be used:
  - Set ratio: the number of sets won divided by number of sets lost.
  - Point ratio: number of points scored divided by number of points allowed.
  - Head-to-head standings: any remaining tied teams are ranked based on the results of head-to-head matches involving the teams in question.

== Preliminary round ==
- All times are Philippine Standard Time (UTC+8:00).
- The top two teams per pool advance to the Quarterfinal round.

=== Pool A ===
Pos	Team	Pld	W	L	Pts	SW	SL	SR	SPW	SPL	SPR	Qualification
1	Bethel Academy Bethelites	4	3	1	7	11	9	1.222	218	167	1.305	Quarterfinals
2	Lyceum Junior Lady Pirates	4	3	1	6	10	9	1.111	173	165	1.048	Quarterfinals
3	DLSL Green Stallions	4	2	2	5	9	10	0.900	222	212	1.047	
4	California Academy Cal Babies	4	1	3	3	7	11	0.636	197	238	0.828	
5	CKSC Blue Dragons	4	1	3	2	6	11	0.545	158	195	0.810	

Date	Time	Venue		Score		Set 1	Set 2	Set 3	Set 4	Set 5	Total	Report
May 29	10:00	ADU Main Court	DLSL Green Stallions	2–1	Bethel Academy Bethelites	18–25	25–23	25–20			68–68	
May 29	12:00	ADU Main Court	California Academy Cal Babies	0–2	CKSC Blue Dragons	19–25	26–28				45–53	
May 30	10:00	Arellano Gym	Bethel Academy Bethelites	2–0	Lyceum Junior Lady Pirates	25–14	25–9				50–23	
May 30	12:00	Arellano Gym	CKSC Blue Dragons	0–2	DLSL Green Stallions	16–25	22–25				38–50	
May 31	12:00	Arellano Gym	Lyceum Junior Lady Pirates	2–0	DLSL Green Stallions	25–19	25–20				50–39	
June 2	12:00	ADU Main Court	CKSC Blue Dragons	0–2	Bethel Academy Bethelites	16–25	22–25				38–50	
June 2	14:00	ADU Main Court	California Academy Cal Babies	1–2	Lyceum Junior Lady Pirates	25–20	13–25	9–25			47–70	
June 3	12:00	PA	Bethel Academy Bethelites	2–0	California Academy Cal Babies	25–18	25–20				50–38	
June 4	10:00	PA	Lyceum Junior Lady Pirates	2–0	CKSC Blue Dragons	25–16	25–13				50–29	
June 4	16:00	PA	DLSL Green Stallions	1–2	California Academy Cal Babies	18–25	25–17	22–25			65–67	

=== Pool B ===
Pos	Team	Pld	W	L	Pts	SW	SL	SR	SPW	SPL	SPR	Qualification
1	FEU–D Lady Baby Tamaraws	4	4	0	8	12	8	1.500	200	135	1.481	Quarterfinals
2	Arellano Lady Braves	4	3	1	6	10	9	1.111	227	223	1.018	Quarterfinals
3	NCF Lady Tigers	4	1	3	4	8	11	0.727	223	233	0.957	
4	DLSZ Junior Lady Spikers	4	1	3	3	7	11	0.636	214	239	0.895	
5	EAC Lady Brigadiers	4	1	3	2	6	11	0.545	144	178	0.809	

Date	Time	Venue		Score		Set 1	Set 2	Set 3	Set 4	Set 5	Total	Report
May 29	16:00	ADU Main Court	NCF Lady Tigers	1–2	DLSZ Junior Lady Spikers	25–23	20–25	27–29			72–77	
May 30	16:00	Arellano Gym	Arellano Lady Braves	2–0	EAC Lady Brigadiers	25–17	25–17				50–34	
May 31	10:00	Arellano Gym	DLSZ Junior Lady Spikers	0–2	EAC Lady Brigadiers	23–25	5–25				28–50	
May 31	16:00	Arellano Gym	FEU–D Lady Baby Tamaraws	2–0	NCF Lady Tigers	25–15	25–13				50–28	
June 2	10:00	ADU Main Court	FEU–D Lady Baby Tamaraws	2–0	Arellano Lady Braves	25–20	25–20				50–40	
June 2	12:00	ADU Gym Court 2	NCF Lady Tigers	2–0	EAC Lady Brigadiers	25–15	25–21				50–36	
June 3	14:00	PA	DLSZ Junior Lady Spikers	0–2	FEU–D Lady Baby Tamaraws	23–25	20–25				43–50	
June 3	16:00	PA	Arellano Lady Braves	2–1	NCF Lady Tigers	27–25	18–25	25–23			70–73	
June 4	08:00	PA	Arellano Lady Braves	2–1	DLSZ Junior Lady Spikers	25–21	17–25	25–20			67–66	
June 4	14:00	PA	EAC Lady Brigadiers	0–2	FEU–D Lady Baby Tamaraws	13–25	11–25				24–50	

=== Pool C ===
Pos	Team	Pld	W	L	Pts	SW	SL	SR	SPW	SPL	SPR	Qualification
1	Bacolod Tay Tung Thunderbolts	3	3	0	6	9	6	1.500	198	174	1.138	Quarterfinals
2	KMS Lady Vikings	3	2	1	5	8	7	1.143	192	170	1.129	Quarterfinals
3	UST Junior Tigresses	3	1	2	4	7	8	0.875	209	210	0.995	
4	Perpetual Junior Lady Altas	3	0	3	1	4	9	0.444	130	175	0.743	

Date	Time	Venue		Score		Set 1	Set 2	Set 3	Set 4	Set 5	Total	Report
May 29	14:00	ADU Main Court	Bacolod Tay Tung Thunderbolts	2–1	UST Junior Tigresses	24–26	25–23	25–20			74–69	
May 30	14:00	Arellano Gym	Bacolod Tay Tung Thunderbolts	2–1	KMS Lady Vikings	24–26	25–22	25–23			74–71	
May 31	08:00	Arellano Gym	Perpetual Junior Lady Altas	1–2	UST Junior Tigresses	23–25	27–25	15–25			65–75	
June 2	16:00	ADU Gym Court 2	Perpetual Junior Lady Altas	0–2	Bacolod Tay Tung Thunderbolts	16–25	18–25				34–50	
June 3	08:00	PA	KMS Lady Vikings	2–0	Perpetual Junior Lady Altas	25–17	25–14				50–31	
June 4	12:00	PA	KMS Lady Vikings	2–1	UST Junior Tigresses	21–25	25–19	25–21			71–65	

=== Pool D ===
Pos	Team	Pld	W	L	Pts	SW	SL	SR	SPW	SPL	SPR	Qualification
1	Adamson Lady Baby Falcons	3	3	0	6	9	6	1.500	150	112	1.339	Quarterfinals
2	NUNS Lady Bullpups	3	2	1	4	7	7	1.000	141	111	1.270	Quarterfinals
3	HRC Girls' Team	3	1	2	2	5	8	0.625	142	164	0.866	
4	UPIS Junior Fighting Maroons	3	0	3	1	4	9	0.444	127	173	0.734	

Date	Time	Venue		Score		Set 1	Set 2	Set 3	Set 4	Set 5	Total	Report
May 29	08:00	ADU Main Court	Adamson Lady Baby Falcons	2–0	UPIS Junior Fighting Maroons	25–12	25–14				50–26	
May 30	08:00	Arellano Gym	Adamson Lady Baby Falcons	2–0	HRC Girls' Team	25–22	25–23				50–45	
May 31	14:00	Arellano Gym	HRC Girls' Team	0–2	NUNS Lady Bullpups	14–25	10–25				24–50	
June 2	14:00	ADU Gym Court 2	HRC Girls' Team	2–1	UPIS Junior Fighting Maroons	25–19	23–25	25–20			73–64	
June 2	16:00	ADU Main Court	NUNS Lady Bullpups	0–2	Adamson Lady Baby Falcons	18–25	23–25				41–50	
June 3	10:00	PA	UPIS Junior Fighting Maroons	0–2	NUNS Lady Bullpups	17–25	20–25				37–50	

== Final round ==
5th place match
June 9
Arellano Lady Braves	0
FEU–D Lady Baby Tamaraws	3
7th place match
June 9
Bethel Academy Bethelites	3
Lyceum Junior Lady Pirates	1

5th–8th semifinals
June 6
Bethel Academy Bethelites	2
Arellano Lady Braves	3
June 6
FEU–D Lady Baby Tamaraws	3
Lyceum Junior Lady Pirates	0

Quarterfinals
June 5
A1	Bethel Academy Bethelites	0
C2	KMS Lady Vikings	3
June 5
C1	Bacolod Tay Tung Thunderbolts	3
B2	Arellano Lady Braves	0
June 5
B1	FEU–D Lady Baby Tamaraws	0
D2	NUNS Lady Bullpups	3
June 5
D1	Adamson Lady Baby Falcons	3
A2	Lyceum Junior Lady Pirates	0

Semifinals
June 6
KMS Lady Vikings	0
Bacolod Tay Tung Thunderbolts	3
June 6
NUNS Lady Bullpups	0
Adamson Lady Baby Falcons	3

Championship
June 9
Bacolod Tay Tung Thunderbolts	0
Adamson Lady Baby Falcons	3
3rd place match
June 9
KMS Lady Vikings	3
NUNS Lady Bullpups	1

=== Quarterfinals ===
Date	Time	Venue		Score		Set 1	Set 2	Set 3	Set 4	Set 5	Total	Report
June 5	10:00	ADU Main Court	Bethel Academy Bethelites	0–3	KMS Lady Vikings	17–25	23–25	17–25			57–75	
June 5	12:00	ADU Main Court	FEU–D Lady Baby Tamaraws	0–3	NUNS Lady Bullpups	6–25	23–25	17–25			46–75	
June 5	14:00	ADU Main Court	Bacolod Tay Tung Thunderbolts	3–0	Arellano Lady Braves	25–17	25–21	25–20			75–58	
June 5	16:00	ADU Main Court	Adamson Lady Baby Falcons	3–0	Lyceum Junior Lady Pirates	25–13	27–25	25–20			77–58	

=== 5th–8th semifinals ===
Date	Time	Venue		Score		Set 1	Set 2	Set 3	Set 4	Set 5	Total	Report
June 6	10:00	PA	Bethel Academy Bethelites	2–3	Arellano Lady Braves	21–25	25–27	25–21	25–20	12–15	108–108	
June 6	12:00	PA	FEU–D Lady Baby Tamaraws	3–0	Lyceum Junior Lady Pirates	25–19	25–22	25–18			75–59	

=== 7th place match ===
Date	Time	Venue		Score		Set 1	Set 2	Set 3	Set 4	Set 5	Total	Report
June 9	10:00	ADU Main Court	Bethel Academy Bethelites	3–1	Lyceum Junior Lady Pirates	22–25	25–20	25–19	25-20		97–64	

=== 5th place match ===
Date	Time	Venue		Score		Set 1	Set 2	Set 3	Set 4	Set 5	Total	Report
June 9	12:00	ADU Main Court	Arellano Lady Braves	0–3	FEU–D Lady Baby Tamaraws	18–25	23–25	19–25			60–75	

=== Semifinals ===
Date	Time	Venue		Score		Set 1	Set 2	Set 3	Set 4	Set 5	Total	Report
June 6	14:00	PA	Bacolod Tay Tung Thunderbolts	3–0	KMS Lady Vikings	25–18	25–14	25–23			75–55	
June 6	16:00	PA	Adamson Lady Baby Falcons	3–0	NUNS Lady Bullpups	25–19	25–17	25–17			75–53	

=== 3rd place match ===
Date	Time	Venue		Score		Set 1	Set 2	Set 3	Set 4	Set 5	Total	Report
June 9	14:00	ADU Main Court	NUNS Lady Bullpups	1–3	KMS Lady Vikings	18–25	26–24	23–25	22–25		89–99	

=== Championship match ===
Date	Time	Venue		Score		Set 1	Set 2	Set 3	Set 4	Set 5	Total	Report
June 9	16:00	ADU Main Court	Bacolod Tay Tung Thunderbolts	0–3	Adamson Lady Baby Falcons	20–25	5–25	22–25			47–75	

== Final standings ==
Rank	Team
1st place, gold medalist(s)	Adamson Lady Baby Falcons
2nd place, silver medalist(s)	Bacolod Tay Tung Thunderbolts
3rd place, bronze medalist(s)	King's Montessori School Lady Vikings
4	NUNS Lady Bullpups
5	FEU–D Lady Baby Tamaraws
6	Arellano Lady Braves
7	Bethel Academy Bethelites
8	Lyceum Junior Lady Pirates
9	DLSL Green Stallions
10–11	UST Junior Tigresses
10–11	HRC Girls' Team
12–16	NCF Lady Tigers
12–16	DLSZ Junior Lady Spikers
12–16	California Academy Cal Babies
12–16	CKSC Blue Dragons
12–16	EAC Lady Brigadiers
17–18	Perpetual Junior Lady Altas
17–18	UPIS Junior Fighting Maroons

2024 Shakey's Girls Volleyball Invitational League champions
Adamson Lady Baby Falcons
1st title

Team Roster
Shaina Marie Nitura (c), Samantha Chloey Cantada, Kristal Joy Martin, Ayeisha Jenine Almario, Ma. Cassandra Elliana Estrada, Abegail Segui, Felicity Marie Sagaysay, Jennel Sofia Arasan, Lhouriz Tuddao, Janna Mabelle Dizon, Antonia Baloloy, Seanne Ordonio, Mariana Maegan Pineda, Claire Jesselou Gam, Mary Ann Grace del Moral
Head coach
JP Yude

== Awards and medalists ==
=== Individual awards ===
Award	Player	Team	Ref.
Most Valuable Player	Shaina Marie Nitura	Adamson	
1st Best Outside Spiker	Rhose Viane Almendralejo	Bacolod Tay Tung	
2nd Best Outside Spiker	Samantha Cantada	Adamson	
1st Best Middle Blocker	Lhouriz Tuddao	Adamson	
2nd Best Middle Blocker	Ma. Robielle Silla	NUNS	
Best Opposite Spiker	Abegail Segui	Adamson	
Best Setter	Felicity Sagaysay	Adamson	
Best Libero	Rhea May Tomas	Bacolod Tay Tung	

=== Medalists ===
Gold	Silver	Bronze
Adamson Lady Baby Falcons: Shaina Nitura (c); Samantha Chloey Cantanda; Kristal Joy Martin; Ayeisha Jenine Almario; Ma. Cassandra Elliana Estrada; Abegail Segui; Felicity Marie Sagaysay; Jennel Sofia Arasan; Lhouriz Tuddao; Janna Mabelle Dizon; Antonia Baloloy; Seanne Ordonia; Mariana Maegan Pineda; Claire Jesselou Gam; Mary Ann Grace Del Moral Head Coach: JP Yude	Bacolod Tay Tung Thunderbolts: Jothea Marie Ramos (c); Ana Ysabelle Hermosura; Jihan Isabelle Chuatico; Alijah Marie Ysulan; Jan Rose Bulak; Rhose Viane Almendralejo; Alexia Marie Montoro; Camila Amor Bartolome; Ana Francessca Hermosura; Abigael Labajo; Dona Mae De Leon; Mary Antonette Bontia; Patricia Grace Hiponia; Joenil Anne Ramos; Briana Nikola Ang; Rhea May Tomas; Czarina Marcella Dosayla Head Coach: Ian Macariola	King's Montessori School Lady Vikings: Aiana Lujille Jumawan (c); Sheniry Neverio; Shahanna Rheign Lleses; Shaerin Claire Figueroa; Ashley Nicole Macalinao; Mhyne Venizze Escote; Symone Darlene Ildefonso; Shekaina Rhedge Lleses; Samantha Denise Ildefonso; Biance Denise Dungca; Jayrelle Jhen Mesa; Justine Ivony Decena; Kriska Morena Gindap; Paula Palma Head Coach: Rogelio Getigan
