= 2023 Shakey's Girls Volleyball Invitational League =

2023 collegiate volleyball competition

Tournament details
- Dates: May 7 – June 3, 2023
- Teams: 16
- Venue: San Andres Sports Complex

Final positions
- Champions: California Academy (1st title)
- Runners-up: Naga College Foundation
- Third place: Tay Tung Thunderbolts
- Fourth place: NUNS Lady Bullpups

Tournament awards
- MVP: Casiey Dongallo
- Best Setter: Kizzie Madriaga
- Best OH: Ara Ellah Panique
- Best MB: Dona Mae De Leon
- Best OPP: Jelaica Gajero
- Best Libero: IC Cepada

Tournament statistics
- Matches played: 36

The 2023 Shakey's Girls Volleyball Invitational League was the inaugural edition of the high school competition organized by the Shakey's Super League and the first SSL tournament of 2023. The tournament was held from May 7 to June 3, 2023, at San Andres Sports Complex, Malate, Manila. It features 16 high school teams from different schools.

California Academy defeated Naga College Foundation (3–1) in the championship match and crowned as the champions of the tournament. Naga College Foundation settled for silver. Bacolod Tay Tung High School won the bronze after a 3 straight sets against NU Bullpups in the 3rd place match.

== Participating teams ==
The following are teams that entered at the Girls Volleyball Invitational League (SVIL).

Team	School	Collegiate league
Adamson Lady Baby Falcons	Adamson University	UAAP
Arellano Lady Braves	Arellano University	NCAA
California Academy	California Precision Sports	—N/a
DLSL Lady Stallions	De La Salle Lipa	—N/a
GCCF Girls' Blue Wolverines	Gracel Christian College Foundation	—N/a
KMS Girls' Team	King's Montessori School	—N/a
St. Clare Girls' Team	St. Clare College	—N/a
Zobel Junior Lady Archers	De La Salle Santiago Zobel School	UAAP
EAC–ICA Lady Brigadiers	Emilio Aguinaldo College	NCAA
FEU–D Lady Baby Tamaraws	Far Eastern University	UAAP
Lyceum Junior Lady Pirates	Lyceum of the Philippines University – Cavite	NCAA
NCF Lady Tigers	Naga College Foundation	—N/a
NUNS Lady Bullpups	National University–Nazareth School	UAAP
Tay Tung Thunderbolts	Bacolod Tay Tung High School	—N/a
Perpetual Junior Lady Altas	University of Perpetual Help System DALTA	NCAA
UST Junior Tigresses	University of Santo Tomas	UAAP

== Pool composition ==
The teams are grouped via casting lots. Each pool will have 4 teams.

Pool A	Pool B	Pool C	Pool D
NUNS Lady Bullpups	Adamson Lady Baby Falcons	FEU–D Lady Baby Tamaraws	UST Junior Tigresses
GCCF Girls' Blue Wolverines	KMS Girls'. Team	California Precision Sports	Zobel Junior Lady Archers
Perpetual Junior Lady Altas	Lyceum Junior Lady Pirates	Arellano Lady Braves	EAC–ICA Lady Brigadiers
DLSL Lady Stallions	Tay Tung Thunderbolts	St. Claire Girls' Team	NCF Lady Tigers

== Venue ==
All matches
City of Manila
San Andres Sports Complex
Capacity: 5,000

== Format ==
The preliminary rounds will be played in best of three sets. The semifinals and finals will be played in best of five sets.

First round

1. Single-round robin format; 4 pools; Teams are ranked using the FIVB Ranking System.
2. The top two teams per pool will advance to the second round.

Quarterfinals (knockout stage)

1. QF1: A1 vs. C2
2. QF3: C1 vs. B2
3. QF2: B1 vs. D2
4. QF4: D1 vs. A2

Semifinals (knockout stage)

1. SF1: QF #1 vs. QF #3
2. SF2: QF #2 vs. QF #4

Finals (knockout stage)

1. Bronze medal: SF1 Loser vs SF2 Loser
2. Gold medal: SF1 Winner vs SF2 Winner

== Pool standing procedure ==
1. Number of matches won
2. Match points
3. Sets ratio
4. Points ratio
5. If the tie continues as per the point ratio between two teams, the priority will be given to the team which won the last match between them. When the tie in points ratio is between three or more teams, a new classification of these teams in the terms of points 1 and 2 will be made taking into consideration only the matches in which they were opposed to each other.

Match won 2–0 or 2–1: 2 match points for the winner, 1 match points for the loser

== Preliminary round ==
- All times are Philippine Standard Time (UTC+8:00).
- The top two teams per pool advance to the Quarterfinal round.

=== Pool A ===
Pos	Team	Pld	W	L	Pts	SW	SL	SR	SPW	SPL	SPR	Qualification
1	NUNS Lady Bullpups	3	3	0	6	9	6	1.500	150	75	2.000	Quarterfinals
2	DLSL Lady Stallions	3	2	1	4	7	7	1.000	133	144	0.924	Quarterfinals
3	GCCF Girls' Blue Wolverines	3	1	2	3	6	8	0.750	170	195	0.872	
4	Perpetual Junior Lady Altas	3	0	3	1	4	9	0.444	109	153	0.712	

Date	Time		Score		Set 1	Set 2	Set 3	Set 4	Set 5	Total	Report
7 May	15:30	DLSL Lady Stallions	2–1	GCCF Girls' Blue Wolverines	25–17	9–25	25–17			59–59	
13 May	9:00	Perpetual Junior Lady Altas	0–2	NUNS Lady Bullpups	7–25	6–25				13–50	
14 May	9:00	NUNS Lady Bullpups	2–0	DLSL Lady Stallions	25–17	25–7	–			50–24	
14 May	15:30	GCCF Girls' Blue Wolverines	2–1	Perpetual Junior Lady Altas	25–22	23–25	25–14			73–61	
20 May	9:00	GCCF Girls' Blue Wolverines	0–2	NUNS Lady Bullpups	21–25	17–25	–			38–50	
20 May	14:00	Perpetual Junior Lady Altas	0–2	DLSL Lady Stallions	17–25	18–25	–			35–50	

=== Pool B ===
Pos	Team	Pld	W	L	Pts	SW	SL	SR	SPW	SPL	SPR	Qualification
1	Tay Tung Thunderbolts	3	3	0	6	9	6	1.500	154	89	1.730	Quarterfinals
2	Adamson Lady Baby Falcons	3	2	1	4	7	7	1.000	144	116	1.241	Quarterfinals
3	KMS Girls' Team	3	1	2	2	5	8	0.625	126	128	0.984	
4	Lyceum Junior Lady Pirates	3	0	3	0	3	9	0.333	59	150	0.393	

Date	Time		Score		Set 1	Set 2	Set 3	Set 4	Set 5	Total	Report
7 May	10:30	Lyceum Junior Lady Pirates	0–2	KMS Girls' Team	10–25	18–25	–			28–50	
7 May	14:00	Adamson Lady Baby Falcons	0–2	Tay Tung Thunderbolts	27–29	17–25	–			44–54	
13 May	12:00	Tay Tung Thunderbolts	2–0	Lyceum Junior Lady Pirates	25–4	25–7	–			50–11	
13 May	14:00	KMS Girls' Team	0–2	Adamson Lady Baby Falcons	23–25	19–25	–			42–50	
14 May	17:00	Lyceum Junior Lady Pirates	0–2	Adamson Lady Baby Falcons	12–25	8–25	–			20–50	
20 May	17:00	KMS Girls' Team	0–2	Tay Tung Thunderbolts	16–25	18–25	–			34–50	

=== Pool C ===
Pos	Team	Pld	W	L	Pts	SW	SL	SR	SPW	SPL	SPR	Qualification
1	California Academy	3	3	0	6	9	6	1.500	150	89	1.685	Quarterfinals
2	FEU–D Lady Baby Tamaraws	3	2	1	4	7	7	1.000	155	123	1.260	Quarterfinals
3	Arellano Lady Braves	3	1	2	3	6	8	0.750	136	158	0.861	
4	St. Claire Girls' Team	3	0	3	0	3	9	0.333	79	150	0.527	

Date	Time		Score		Set 1	Set 2	Set 3	Set 4	Set 5	Total	Report
7 May	12:00	FEU–D Lady Baby Tamaraws	2–0	St. Claire Girls' Team	25–7	25–11	–			50–18	
13 May	15:30	St. Claire Girls' Team	0–2	California Academy	13–25	11–25	–			24–50	
13 May	17:00	Arellano Lady Braves	1–2	FEU–D Lady Baby Tamaraws	25–21	20–25	10–25			55–71	
14 May	12:00	Arellano Lady Braves	2–0	St. Claire Girls' Team	25–19	25–18	–			50–37	
14 May	14:00	California Academy	2–0	FEU–D Lady Baby Tamaraws	25–17	25–17	–			50–34	
20 May	12:00	California Academy	2–0	Arellano Lady Braves	25–11	25–20	–			50–31	

=== Pool D ===
Pos	Team	Pld	W	L	Pts	SW	SL	SR	SPW	SPL	SPR	Qualification
1	NCF Lady Tigers	3	3	0	6	9	6	1.500	168	107	1.570	Quarterfinals
2	UST Junior Tigresses	3	2	1	5	8	7	1.143	152	128	1.188	Quarterfinals
3	Zobel Junior Lady Archers	3	1	2	2	5	8	0.625	144	168	0.857	
4	EAC–ICA Lady Brigadiers	3	0	3	1	4	9	0.444	116	176	0.659	

Date	Time		Score		Set 1	Set 2	Set 3	Set 4	Set 5	Total	Report
7 May	9:00	UST Junior Tigresses	1–2	NCF Lady Tigers	25–18	14–25	13–25			52–68	
7 May	17:00	Zobel Junior Lady Archers	2–1	EAC–ICA Lady Brigadiers	25–22	26–28	25–18			76–68	
13 May	10:30	EAC–ICA Lady Brigadiers	0–2	UST Junior Tigresses	11–25	10–25	–			21–50	
14 May	10:30	NCF Lady Tigers	2–0	Zobel Junior Lady Archers	25–11	25–18	–			50–29	
20 May	10:30	Zobel Junior Lady Archers	0–2	UST Junior Tigresses	19–25	20–25	–			39–50	
20 May	15:30	EAC–ICA Lady Brigadiers	0–2	NCF Lady Tigers	13–25	14–25	–			27–50	

== Final round ==
5th place match
Jun 4
UST Junior Tigresses	1
Adamson Lady Baby Falcons	3
7th place match
Jun 4
DLSL Lady Stallions	2
FEU–D Lady Baby Tamaraws	3

5th–8th semifinals
May 27
UST Junior Tigresses	3
DLSL Lady Stallions	0
May 27
FEU–D Lady Baby Tamaraws	1
Adamson Lady Baby Falcons	3

Quarterfinals
May 21
A1	NUNS Lady Bullpups	2
C2	FEU–D Lady Baby Tamaraws	0
May 21
C1	California Academy	2
B2	Adamson Lady Baby Falcons	0
May 21
B1	Tay Tung Thunderbolts	2
D2	UST Junior Tigresses	0
May 21
D1	NCF Lady Tigers	2
A2	DLSL Lady Stallions	1

Semifinals
May 27
NUNS Lady Bullpups	1
California Academy	3
May 27
Tay Tung Thunderbolts	1
NCF Lady Tigers	3

Championship
June 4
California Academy	3
NCF Lady Tigers	1
3rd place match
June 4
NUNS Lady Bullpups	0
Tay Tung Thunderbolts	3

=== Quarterfinals ===
Date	Time		Score		Set 1	Set 2	Set 3	Set 4	Set 5	Total	Report
May 21	9:00	NUNS Lady Bullpups	2–0	FEU–D Lady Baby Tamaraws	25–15	25–18	–			50–33	
May 21	12:00	Tay Tung Thunderbolts	2–0	UST Junior Tigresses	25–22	25–23	–			50–45	
May 21	14:00	California Academy	2–0	Adamson Lady Baby Falcons	25–17	25–16	–			50–33	
May 21	16:00	NCF Lady Tigers	2–1	DLSL Lady Stallions	14–25	25–17	25–17			64–59	

=== 5th–8th semifinals ===
Date	Time		Score		Set 1	Set 2	Set 3	Set 4	Set 5	Total	Report
27 May	14:00	UST Junior Tigresses	3–0	DLSL Lady Stallions	25–12	25–18	25–16			75–46	
27 May	16:00	FEU–D Lady Baby Tamaraws	1–3	Adamson Lady Baby Falcons	21–25	25–22	14–25	22–25		82–97	

=== 7th place match ===
Date	Time		Score		Set 1	Set 2	Set 3	Set 4	Set 5	Total	Report
4 Jun	09:00	DLSL Lady Stallions	2–3	FEU–D Lady Baby Tamaraws	25–19	19–25	20–25	26-24	15-17	105–69	

=== 5th place match ===
Date	Time		Score		Set 1	Set 2	Set 3	Set 4	Set 5	Total	Report
4 Jun	12:00	UST Junior Tigresses	1–3	Adamson Lady Baby Falcons	25–23	19–25	20–25	19–25		83–98	

=== Semifinals ===
Date	Time		Score		Set 1	Set 2	Set 3	Set 4	Set 5	Total	Report
May 27	9:00	NUNS Lady Bullpups	1–3	California Academy	25–23	23–25	22–25	25–27		95–100	
May 27	12:00	Tay Tung Thunderbolts	1–3	NCF Lady Tigers	25–11	23–25	23–25	23–25		94–86	

=== 3rd place match ===
Date	Time		Score		Set 1	Set 2	Set 3	Set 4	Set 5	Total	Report
May 21	14:00	NUNS Lady Bullpups	0–3	Tay Tung Thunderbolts	14–25	22–25	15–25			51–75	

=== Championship match ===
Date	Time		Score		Set 1	Set 2	Set 3	Set 4	Set 5	Total	Report
Jun 4	16:00	California Academy	3–1	NCF Lady Tigers	25–18	18–25	25–14	25–19		93–76	

== Final standings ==
Rank	Team
1st place, gold medalist(s)	California Academy
2nd place, silver medalist(s)	NCF Lady Tigers
3rd place, bronze medalist(s)	Tay Tung Thunderbolts
4	NUNS Lady Bullpups
5	Adamson Lady Baby Falcons
6	UST Junior Tigresses
7	FEU–D Lady Baby Tamaraws
8	DLSL Lady Stallions
9–16	Arellano Lady Braves
9–16	Zobel Junior Lady Archers
9–16	EAC–ICA Lady Brigadiers
9–16	GCCF Girls' Blue Wolverines
9–16	KMS Girls' Team
9–16	Lyceum Junior Lady Pirates
9–16	St. Claire Girls' Team
9–16	Perpetual Junior Lady Altas

2023 Shakey's Girls Volleyball Invitational League champions

California Academy
1st title

Team Roster
Mary Shane Reterta, Jaira Angel Lopez, Mhonniecka Joyce Soliven, Jenalyn Umayan, Maxene Lia Nicole Lotivio, Jelaica Faye Gajero, Lovenelle Ebale, Casiey Monique Dongalo, Gracen Sharnel Fernandez,

Avian Grey Micaller, Kizzie Madriaga (c), Aliah Gail Santiago, Fhianna Jhezi Narei Villaret, Jarmien Rodriguez

Head coach
Dr. Obet E. Vital

== Awards and medalists ==
=== Individual awards ===
Award	Player	Team	Ref.
Most Valuable Player	Casiey Dongallo	California Precision Sports	
Best Outside Spiker	Arah Ellah Panique	NCF Lady Tigers	
Best Middle Blocker	Dona Mae De Leon	Tay Tung Thunderbolts	
Best Opposite Spiker	Jelaica Gajero	California Precision Sports	
Best Setter	Kizzie Madriaga	California Precision Sports	
Best Libero	IC Cepada	NUNS Lady Bullpups	

=== Medalists ===
Gold	Silver	Bronze
California Academy MADRIAGA, Kizzie (c); RETERTA, Mary Shane; LOPEZ, Jaira Angel; SOLIVEN, Mhonniecka Joyce; UMAYAN, Jenalyn; LOTIVIO, Maxene Lia Nicole; GAJERO, Jelaica Faye; EBALE, Lovenelle; DONGALO, Casiey Monique; FERNANDEZ, Gracen Sharnel; MICALLER, Avian Grey; SANTIAGO, Aliah Gail; VILLARET, Fianna Jhezi Narei; RODRIGUEZ, Jarmien Head Coach: Dr. Ober E. Vital	NCF Lady Tigers PANIQUE, Arah Ellah (c); SARIE, Sheena Vanessa; MADRONA, Mary Lawrence; DEBALUCOS, Zsamantha Nhicole; BOMBITA, Nathasza Kaye; YAMABE, Cassandra Gwenyth; FLORES, Hizki; BACLAY, Jan Halley; ABITRIA, Keisha; ABITRIA, Ma. Blesida Angelei; SELGA, Rosal Anthea; CORDIAL, Christine Joy; BRAGO, Edcynth Pearl; SERVIDAD, Crisanta Head Coach: Parley Tupaz	Tay Tung Thunderbolts RAMOS, Jothea Marie (c); CORTEZ, Katherine Shaine; CHUATICO, Jihan Isabelle; YSULAN, Alijah Marie; ALMENDRALEJO, Rhose Viane; MONTORO, Alexia Marie; BARTOLOME, Camila Amor; HERMOSURA, Ana Francessca; DE LEON, Dona Mae; BONTIA, Mary Antonette; HIPONIA, Patricia Grace; RAMOS, Joenil Anne Head Coach: Ian M. Macariola
