= PNVF Champions League =

PNVF volleyball competition

- Current season, competition or edition: 2024 PNVF Champions League for Men; 2024 PNVF Champions League for Women
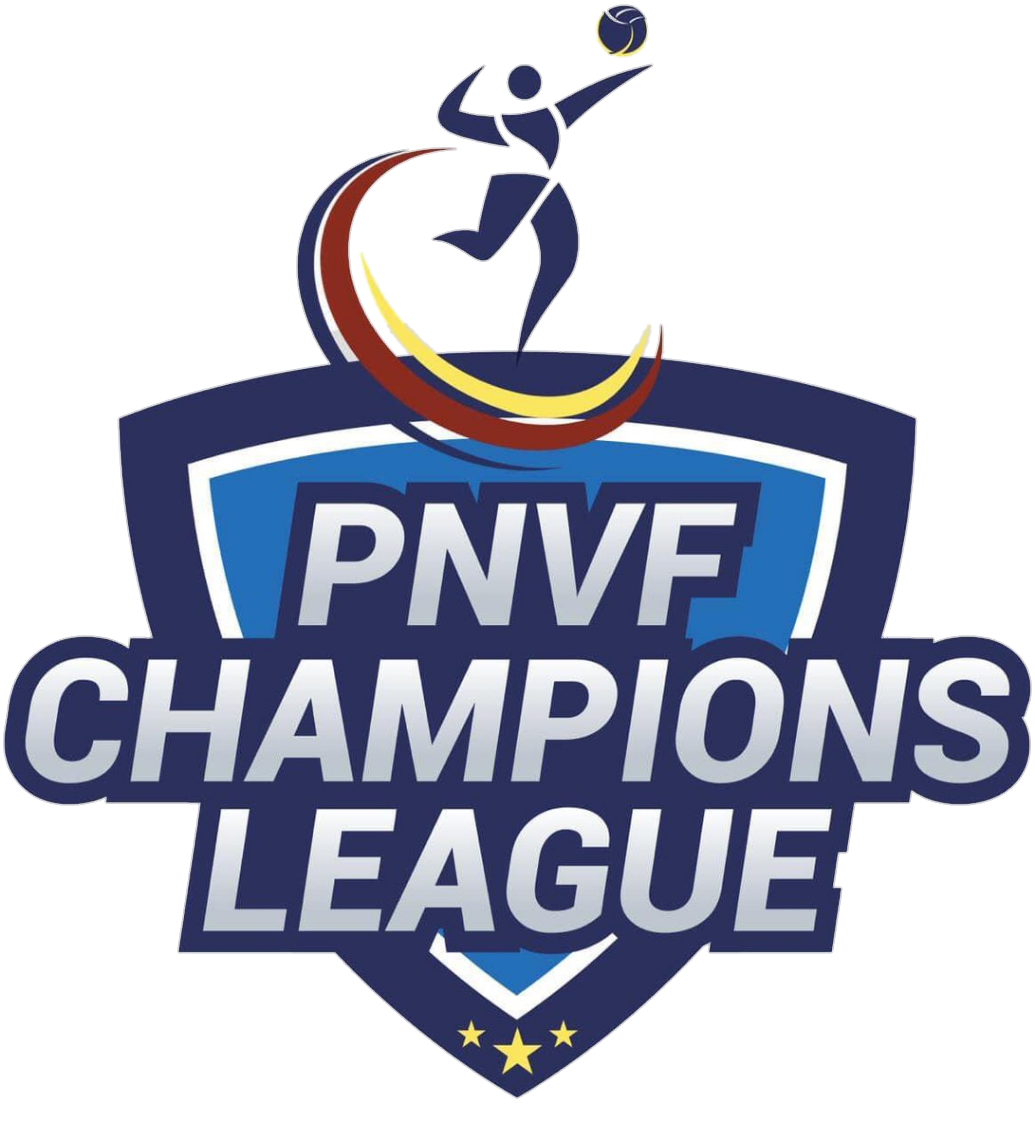
- Official logo
- Sport: Volleyball
- Founded: 2021
- First season: 2021 (Men / Women)
- Organising body: Philippine National Volleyball Federation
- Divisions: 2
- No. of teams: M: 8 (2024); W: 5 (2024)
- Country: Philippines
- Confederation: AVC
- Most recent champions: M: Cignal HD Spikers; W: Petro Gazz Angels
- Most titles: M: Cignal HD Spikers; (2 titles); W: F2 Logistics Cargo Movers; CPS–Antipolo; DLS College of Saint Benilde; Petro Gazz Angels; (1 title each)
- Broadcaster: One Sports
- Streaming partner: Pilipinas Live

The PNVF Champions League (PNVFCL), is a volleyball competition organized by the Philippine National Volleyball Federation (PNVF), the national sports association for volleyball in the Philippines.

== History ==
Shortly after the International Volleyball Federation (FIVB) gave full recognition for the Philippine National Volleyball Federation (PNVF) as the national sports association for volleyball in the Philippines in February 2021, the PNVF announced plans to organize its own league, separate from the two existing commercial leagues, the Premier Volleyball League and the Philippine Super Liga. The Philippines has several other volleyball leagues, such as the UAAP collegiate leagues but none was officially recognized as the "national league".

The PNVF announced that it would be organizing the first men's competition from September 19 to 26, 2021 under a bubble format. The PNVF announced plans to hold an inaugural season of a men's league in September 2021. In September 2021, it was announced that the PNVF Champions League would be held in November instead. A women's competition would also be held in the same month. A beach volleyball tournament for both men and women would also be held in December 2021.

The second season of the PNVF CL commenced in November 2022.

The tournament would be renamed momentarily as the PNVF Challenge Cup in 2023.

For 2024, it will serve as the fourth edition of the PNVF tournament and its third edition as the PNVF Champions League.

== Results summary ==
=== Men's tournament ===
| Season | Champions | Score | Runners-up | Third place | Score | Fourth place | Teams | Ref |
|---|---|---|---|---|---|---|---|---|
| 2021 | Team Dasma Monarchs | 3–1 | Go for Gold-Air Force Aguilas | Manileño Spikers | 3–0 | Global Remit | 7 | |
| 2022 | Cignal HD Spikers | 3–2 | Pikit-North Cotabato AMC G-Spikers | Imus City–AJAA Spikers | 3–0 | PGJC Navy Sea Lions | 15 | |
| 2023 (Note: 2023 PNVF Challenge Cup) | UST Golden Spikers | 3–2 | Cignal HD Spikers | VNS Asereht | 3–2 | National University | 20 | |
| 2024 (Note: This season is considered the third season, discounting the 2023 Challenge Cup.) | Cignal HD Spikers | 3–1 | D' Navigators Iloilo | Benilde Blazers | 3–0 | VNS Asereht Griffins | 8 | |

=== Women's tournament ===
| Season | Champions | Score | Runners-up | Third place | Score | Fourth place | Teams | Ref |
|---|---|---|---|---|---|---|---|---|
| 2021 | F2 Logistics Cargo Movers | Round-robin | Chery Tiggo 7 Pro Crossovers | Petro Gazz Angels | Round-robin | Tuguegarao Perlas Spikers | 6 | |
| 2022 | California Precision Sports-Antipolo | 3–0 | UE Manila-Cherrylume Lady Red Warriors | KMS-Quezon City Lady Vikings | 3–2 | Imus City-AJAA Lady Spikers | 8 | |
| 2023 | DLS College of Saint Benilde | 3–0 | University of the Philippines | Colegio de San Juan de Letran | 3–0 | Philippine Air Force | 16 | |
| 2024 | Petro Gazz Angels | 3–0 | Cignal HD Spikers | Chery Tiggo Crossovers | 3–0 | DLS College of Saint Benilde | 5 | |

== Medal summary ==
=== Women's division ===
| Rank | Team | Gold | Silver | Bronze | Total |
|---|---|---|---|---|---|
| 1 | PetroGazz | 1 | – | 1 | 2 |
| 1 | Chery Tiggo | – | 1 | 1 | 2 |
| 3 | Benilde | 1 | – | – | 1 |
| 3 | California | 1 | – | – | 1 |
| 3 | F2 | 1 | – | – | 1 |
| 3 | Cignal | – | 1 | – | 1 |
| 3 | UE | – | 1 | – | 1 |
| 3 | UP | – | 1 | – | 1 |
| 3 | KMS | – | – | 1 | 1 |
| 3 | Letran | – | – | 1 | 1 |
| Total | | 4 | 4 | 4 | 12 |
