= 2021 PNVF Champions League for Women =

Tournament details
- Dates: November 20–25, 2021
- Teams: 6
- Venue: Aquamarine Gym

Final positions
- Champions: F2 Logistics Cargo Movers (1st title)
- Runners-up: Chery Tiggo 7 Pro Crossovers
- Third place: Petro Gazz Angels
- Fourth place: Tuguegarao Perlas Spikers

Tournament awards
- MVP: Kim Kianna Dy (F2 Logistics)
- Best Setter: Iris Tolenada (F2 Logistics)
- Best OH: Frances Molina (Petro Gazz); Dindin Santiago-Manabat (Chery Tiggo)
- Best MB: Aby Maraño (F2 Logistics); Maika Ortiz (Chery Tiggo)
- Best OPP: Kim Kianna Dy (F2 Logistics)
- Best Libero: Dawn Macandili (F2 Logistics)

Tournament statistics
- Matches played: 15

The women's division of the 2021 PNVF Champions League was held from November 20 to 25, 2021. This is the inaugural edition of the PNVF Champions League. The winner of this tournament will be the country's representative to the Asian Women's Club Volleyball Championships in May next year. F2 Logistics Cargo Movers are the inaugural champions.

== Participating teams ==
The 2021 PNVF Champions League has six participating teams including non-Premier Volleyball League teams Baguio Lady Highlanders and California Precision Sports. The latter is a team composed of high school students.

| Club | Company/LGU | Coach | Captain |
|---|---|---|---|
| Baguio Lady Highlanders | Baguio | Yul Benosa | Cherry Atuban |
| F2 Logistics Cargo Movers | F2 Logistics Philippines | Ramil De Jesus | Aby Maraño |
| Tuguegarao Perlas Spikers | Beach Volleyball Republic / Tuguegarao | Reynaldo Diaz Jr. | Michelle Kathereen Morente |
| Chery Tiggo 7 Pro Crossovers | United Asia Automotive Group | Aaron Velez | Dindin Santiago-Manabat |
| California Precision Sports | California Academy / Antipolo | Jerry Yee | Kizzie Madriaga |
| Petro Gazz Angels | PetroGazz Ventures Phils. Corp. | Arnold Laniog | Relea Ferina Saet |

== Format ==
Originally, the participating teams were to be drawn into two groups of at most four teams for the preliminary round, which was to use a single round robin format. The teams would have advance to the quarterfinals with the fixtures determined by their finishing in their respective pools. The winning teams advance to the semifinals and the losing teams to the classification phase. The semifinals winners would have figured in the gold medal match and the losing sides would play against each other to determine the third best finishing team.

This format was scrapped after the withdrawal of a team from the tournament which originally had seven entrants. The tournament format was revised and adopted a single-round robin format, with all teams in a single pool, with no play-off phase.

== Draw ==
Seven teams originally entered the 2021 PNVF Champions League. They were drawn into two groups, Pool A and Pool B. Sta. Lucia Lady Realtors which was drawn in Pool B withdrew after the draw. The two pools were scrapped.

Original pools
| Pool A | Pool B |
|---|---|
| Baguio Lady Highlanders; F2 Logistics Cargo Movers; Perlas Spikers | Chery Tiggo 7 Pro Crossovers; California Precision Sports; Petro Gazz Angels; ~~Sta. Lucia Lady Realtors~~ (withdrew) |

== Tournament ==
- All times are Philippine Standard Time (UTC+08:00).

| Pos | Team | Pld | W | L | Pts | SW | SL | SR | SPW | SPL | SPR |
|---|---|---|---|---|---|---|---|---|---|---|---|
| 1 | F2 Logistics Cargo Movers | 5 | 5 | 0 | 15 | 15 | 0 | MAX | 375 | 252 | 1.488 |
| 2 | Chery Tiggo 7 Pro Crossovers | 5 | 3 | 2 | 10 | 11 | 7 | 1.571 | 411 | 381 | 1.079 |
| 3 | Petro Gazz Angels | 5 | 3 | 2 | 9 | 11 | 9 | 1.222 | 430 | 385 | 1.117 |
| 4 | Tuguegarao Perlas Spikers | 5 | 2 | 3 | 6 | 8 | 10 | 0.800 | 394 | 373 | 1.056 |
| 5 | California Precision Sports | 5 | 2 | 3 | 5 | 7 | 12 | 0.583 | 396 | 413 | 0.959 |
| 6 | Baguio Lady Highlanders | 5 | 0 | 5 | 0 | 1 | 15 | 0.067 | 196 | 398 | 0.492 |

Source: PNVF

| Date | Time | | Score | | Set 1 | Set 2 | Set 3 | Set 4 | Set 5 | Total | Report |
|---|---|---|---|---|---|---|---|---|---|---|---|
| Nov 20 | 10:00 | Baguio Lady Highlanders | 0–3 | Petro Gazz Angels | 10–25 | 13–25 | 10–25 | | | 33–75 | |
| Nov 20 | 13:30 | F2 Logistics Cargo Movers | 3–0 | California Precision Sports | 25–21 | 25–14 | 25–19 | | | 75–54 | |
| Nov 20 | 16:00 | Tuguegarao Perlas Spikers | 1–3 | Chery Tiggo 7 Pro Crossovers | 22–25 | 25–20 | 14–25 | 23–25 | | 84–95 | |
| Nov 21 | 10:00 | California Precision Sports | 1–3 | Tuguegarao Perlas Spikers | 20–25 | 27–25 | 15–25 | 17–25 | | 79–100 | |
| Nov 21 | 13:30 | Baguio Lady Highlanders | 0–3 | F2 Logistics Cargo Movers | 12–25 | 10–25 | 6–25 | | | 28–75 | |
| Nov 21 | 16:00 | Chery Tiggo 7 Pro Crossovers | 2–3 | Petro Gazz Angels | 25–22 | 20–25 | 25–21 | 21–25 | 11–15 | 102–108 | |
| Nov 22 | 10:00 | Baguio Lady Highlanders | 0–3 | Tuguegarao Perlas Spikers | 10–25 | 5–25 | 14–25 | | | 29–75 | |
| Nov 22 | 13:30 | California Precision Sports | 0–3 | Chery Tiggo 7 Pro Crossovers | 25–27 | 22–25 | 23–25 | | | 70–77 | Report |
| Nov 22 | 16:00 | Petro Gazz Angels | 0–3 | F2 Logistics Cargo Movers | 16–25 | 23–25 | 14–25 | | | 53–75 | |
| Nov 23 | 13:30 | Baguio Lady Highlanders | 1–3 | California Precision Sports | 14–25 | 25–23 | 11–25 | 12–25 | | 62–98 | |
| Nov 23 | 16:00 | F2 Logistics Cargo Movers | 3–0 | Tuguegarao Perlas Spikers | 25–18 | 25–18 | 25–19 | | | 75–55 | |
| Nov 24 | 13:30 | Petro Gazz Angels | 2–3 | California Precision Sports | 25–18 | 25–12 | 22–25 | 14–25 | 13–15 | 99–95 | |
| Nov 24 | 16:00 | Baguio Lady Highlanders | 0–3 | Chery Tiggo 7 Pro Crossovers | 13–25 | 17–25 | 14–25 | | | 44–75 | |
| Nov 25 | 13:30 | Tuguegarao Perlas Spikers | 1–3 | Petro Gazz Angels | 11–25 | 24–26 | 25–19 | 20–25 | | 80–95 | |
| Nov 25 | 16:00 | Chery Tiggo 7 Pro Crossovers | 0–3 | F2 Logistics Cargo Movers | 20–25 | 20–25 | 22–25 | | | 62–75 | |

== Final standing ==
| Rank | Team |
|---|---|
| 1st place, gold medalist(s) | F2 Logistics Cargo Movers |
| 2nd place, silver medalist(s) | Chery Tiggo 7 Pro Crossovers |
| 3rd place, bronze medalist(s) | Petro Gazz Angels |
| 4 | Tuguegarao Perlas Spikers |
| 5 | California Precision Sports |
| 6 | Baguio Lady Highlanders |

| Qualified for the 2022 Asian Women's Club Volleyball Championship |

2021 PNVF Champions League for Women Champions

1st title

14-Women roster
Tyler-Marie Kalei Mau, Aby Maraño (c), Maria Lourdes Clemente, Victonara Galang, Dawn Macandili, Rovene Andrea Instrella, Mary Joy Baron, Kim Kianna Dy, Carmel June Saga, Aduke Christine Ogunsanya, Ernestine Tiamzon, Rose Mary Cailing, Desiree Cheng, Iris Janelle Tolenada
Head coach
Ramil De Jesus

== Awards ==
=== Individual awards ===
| Award | Player | Team | Ref. |
|---|---|---|---|
| Most Valuable Player | Kim Kianna Dy | F2 Logistics | |
| 1st Best Outside Spiker | Frances Molina | Petro Gazz | |
| 2nd Best Outside Spiker | Dindin Santiago-Manabat | Chery Tiggo | |
| 1st Best Middle Blocker | Aby Maraño | F2 Logistics | |
| 2nd Best Middle Blocker | Maika Ortiz | Chery Tiggo | |
| Best Opposite Spiker | Kim Kianna Dy | F2 Logistics | |
| Best Setter | Iris Tolenada | F2 Logistics | |
| Best Libero | Dawn Macandili | F2 Logistics | |

== See also ==
- 2021 PNVF Champions League for Men
