= 2022 PNVF Champions League for Women =

2022 volleyball competition

Tournament details
- Dates: November 6–13, 2022
- Teams: 8
- Venue: PhilSports Arena

Final positions
- Champions: CPS–Antipolo (1st title)
- Runners-up: UE Manila–Cherrylume
- Third place: KMS–Quezon City
- Fourth place: Imus City–AJAA

Tournament awards
- MVP: Casiey Dongallo (CPS–Antipolo)
- Best Setter: Gyzelle Sy (Imus City–AJAA)
- Best OH: Janeca Lana (UE Manila–Cherrylume); Casiey Dongallo (CPS–Antipolo)
- Best MB: Jenalyn Umayam (CPS-Antipolo); Riza Nogales (UE Manila–Cherrylume)
- Best OPP: Jelai Gajero (CPS–Antipolo)
- Best Libero: Jellie Tempiatura (KMS–Quezon City)

Tournament statistics
- Matches played: 16

The women's division of the 2022 PNVF Champions League began on November 6 to 13, 2022 at PhilSports Arena, Pasig City, Philippines. This is the second edition of the PNVF Champions League.

California Precision Sports-Antipolo won against UE Manila-Cherrylume Lady Red Warriors in 3 sets to claim the championship title. KMS-Quezon City Lady Vikings secured the bronze after outlasted Imus City-AJAA Lady Spikers in 5 sets.

== Participating teams ==
8 teams entered the 2022 PNVF Champions League.

Club	Sponsor	Locality	Coach	Captain
California Precision Sports–Antipolo	California Academy	Antipolo	Obet Vital	Kizzie Madriaga
Davao City Lady Agilas	—N/a	Davao City		
ICC–Caloocan City Lady Bluehawks	Immaculada Concepcion College	Caloocan	Edgar Barroga	
Imus City–AJAA Lady Spikers	—N/a	Imus	Bunso Ramirez	Gyzelle Sy
KMS–Quezon City Lady Vikings	Kings Montessori School	Quezon City	Rogelio Getigan	Justine Dorog
Tomodachi Bulacan Bulakenyas	—N/a	Bulacan	Jonnel Regalado	
UE Manila–Cherrylume Lady Red Warriors	University of the East; Mileage Asia Corporation	Manila	Ronwald Dimaculangan	
University of Batangas–Batangas City Lady Brahmans	University of Batangas	Batangas City	Roderick Del Mundo	

== Format ==
The following format will be conducted for the entirety of the conference:

Preliminary Round

1. Single-round robin preliminaries; 8 teams; 2 pools; Teams are ranked using the FIVB Ranking System.
2. The top two teams in each pool are qualified for the semifinal round

Semifinal round

1. A1 vs. B2
2. B1 vs. A2

Finals

1. Bronze medal: SF1 Loser vs SF2 Loser
2. Gold medal: SF1 Winner vs SF2 Winner

== Venue ==
All matches
Pasig
PhilSports Arena
Capacity: 10,000
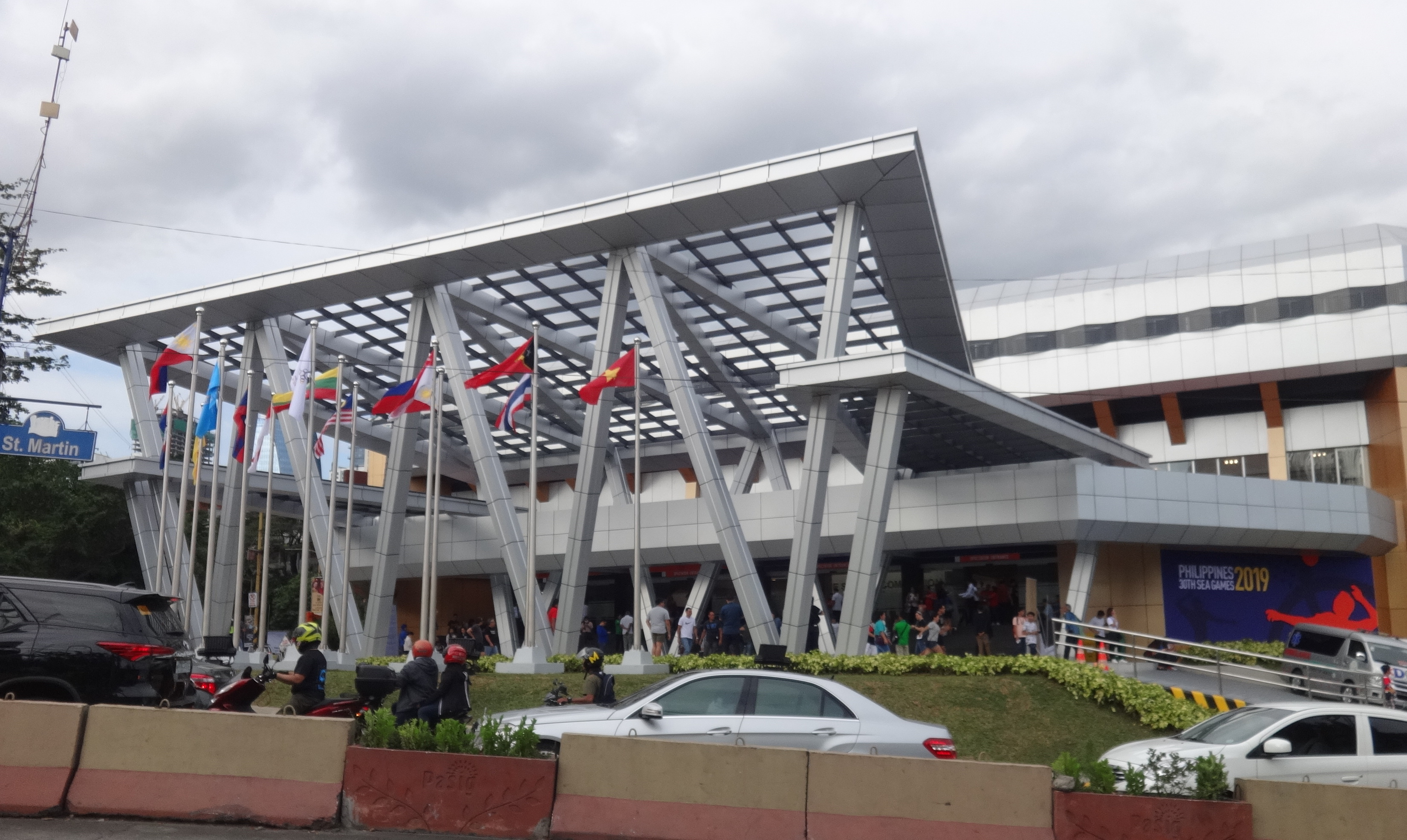

== Pools composition ==
The 8 teams were divided into 4 teams in each pool.

Pool A	Pool B
ICC-Caloocan City Lady Bluehawks	California Precision Sports–Antipolo
Imus City-AJAA Lady Spikers	Davao City Lady Agilas
KMS-Quezon City Lady Vikings	Tomodachi Bulacan Bulakenyas
UB-Batangas City Lady Brahmans	UE Manila–Cherrylume Lady Red Warriors

== Preliminary round ==
- All times are Philippine Standard Time (UTC+8:00).

=== Pool A ===
Pos	Team	Pld	W	L	Pts	SW	SL	SR	SPW	SPL	SPR	Qualification
1	KMS-Quezon City Lady Vikings	3	3	0	8	9	2	4.500	250	213	1.174	Semifinals
2	Imus City-AJAA Lady Spikers	3	2	1	7	8	4	2.000	269	230	1.170	Semifinals
3	UB-Batangas City Lady Brahmans	3	1	2	3	4	7	0.571	221	253	0.874	
4	ICC-Caloocan City Lady Bluehawks	3	0	3	0	1	9	0.111	198	242	0.818	

Date	Time		Score		Set 1	Set 2	Set 3	Set 4	Set 5	Total	Report
6 Nov	08:00	ICC-Caloocan City Lady Bluehawks	0–3	KMS-Quezon City Lady Vikings	25–27	18–25	17–25			60–77	
6 Nov	10:00	UB-Batangas City Lady Brahmans	1–3	Imus City-AJAA Lady Spikers	25–21	12–25	23–25	16–25		76–96	
7 Nov	14:30	KMS-Quezon City Lady Vikings	3–0	UB-Batangas City Lady Brahmans	25–20	25–15	25–20			75–55	
7 Nov	16:30	Imus City-AJAA Lady Spikers	3–0	ICC-Caloocan City Lady Bluehawks	25–20	25–20	25–16			75–56	
9 Nov	08:00	KMS-Quezon City Lady Vikings	3–2	Imus City-AJAA Lady Spikers	14–25	25–20	19–25	25–16	15–12	98–98	
9 Nov	10:00	ICC-Caloocan City Lady Bluehawks	1–3	UB-Batangas City Lady Brahmans	15–25	25–15	23–25	19–25		82–90	

=== Pool B ===
Pos	Team	Pld	W	L	Pts	SW	SL	SR	SPW	SPL	SPR	Qualification
1	California Precision Sports–Antipolo	3	3	0	9	9	1	9.000	169	129	1.310	Semifinals
2	UE Manila-Cherrylume Lady Red Warriors	3	2	1	6	7	3	2.333	161	158	1.019	Semifinals
3	Davao City Lady Agilas	3	1	2	3	3	6	0.500	139	126	1.103	
4	Tomodachi Bulacan Bulakenyas	3	0	3	0	0	9	0.000	94	150	0.627	

Date	Time		Score		Set 1	Set 2	Set 3	Set 4	Set 5	Total	Report
6 Nov	12:00	Davao City Lady Agilas	3–0	Tomodachi Bulacan Bulakenyas	25–21	25–9	25–21			75–51	
6 Nov	14:00	California Precision Sports–Antipolo	3–1	UE Manila-Cherrylume Lady Red Warriors	25–23	19–25	25–16	25–22		94–86	
7 Nov	18:30	UE Manila-Cherrylume Lady Red Warriors	3–0	Davao City Lady Agilas	25–20	25–23	25–21			75–64	
7 Nov	20:30	Tomodachi Bulacan Bulakenyas	0–3	California Precision Sports–Antipolo	12–25	15–25	16–25			43–75	
10 Nov	18:30	Davao City Lady Agilas	0–3	California Precision Sports–Antipolo	25–20	25–22	–			50–42	
10 Nov	20:30	Tomodachi Bulacan Bulakenyas	0–3	UE Manila-Cherrylume Lady Red Warriors	12–25	17–25	15–25			44–75	

== Final round ==
- All times are Philippines Standard Time (UTC+08:00)

Semifinals
12 November
KMS-Quezon City Lady Vikings	0
UE Manila-Cherrylume Lady Red Warriors	3
12 November
California Precision Sports–Antipolo	3
Imus City-AJAA Lady Spikers	1

Championship
13 November
UE Manila-Cherrylume Lady Red Warriors	0
California Precision Sports–Antipolo	3
3rd place match
13 November
KMS-Quezon City Lady Vikings	3
Imus City-AJAA Lady Spikers	2

=== Semifinals ===
Date	Time		Score		Set 1	Set 2	Set 3	Set 4	Set 5	Total	Report
12 Nov	13:00	KMS-Quezon City Lady Vikings	0–3	UE Manila-Cherrylume Lady Red Warriors	20–25	16–25	16–25			52–75	
12 Nov	15:00	California Precision Sports–Antipolo	3–1	Imus City-AJAA Lady Spikers	26–28	25–13	25–21	25–19		101–81	

=== 3rd place match ===
Date	Time		Score		Set 1	Set 2	Set 3	Set 4	Set 5	Total	Report
13 Nov	12:30	KMS-Quezon City Lady Vikings	3–2	Imus City-AJAA Lady Spikers	25–21	24–26	21–25	25–19	15–9	110–100	

=== Championship ===
Date	Time		Score		Set 1	Set 2	Set 3	Set 4	Set 5	Total	Report
13 Nov	15:00	UE Manila-Cherrylume Lady Red Warriors	0–3	California Precision Sports–Antipolo	19–25	18–25	21–25			58–75	

== Final standing ==
Rank	Team
1st place, gold medalist(s)	California Precision Sports–Antipolo
2nd place, silver medalist(s)	UE Manila-Cherrylume Lady Red Warriors
3rd place, bronze medalist(s)	KMS-Quezon City Lady Vikings
4	Imus City-AJAA Lady Spikers
5	UB-Batangas City Lady Brahmans
6	Davao City Lady Agilas
7	ICC-Caloocan City Lady Bluehawks
8	Tomodachi Bulacan Bulakenyas

2022 PNVF Champions League for Women Champions

1st title

== Awards ==
=== Individual awards ===
Award	Player	Team	Ref.
Most Valuable Player	Casiey Dongallo	CPS–Antipolo	
1st Best Outside Spiker	Janeca Lana	UE Manila-Cherrylume	
2nd Best Outside Spiker	Casiey Dongallo	CPS–Antipolo	
1st Best Middle Blocker	Jenalyn Umayam	CPS–Antipolo	
2nd Best Middle Blocker	Riza Nogales	UE Manila-Cherrylume	
Best Opposite Spiker	Jelai Gajero	CPS–Antipolo	
Best Setter	Gyzelle Sy	Imus City-AJAA	
Best Libero	Jellie Tempiatura	KMS-Quezon City	

== See also ==
- 2022 PNVF Champions League for Men
