= Casiey Dongallo =

Filipino volleyball player

Personal information
- Full name: Casiey Monique Dongallo
- Nationality: Filipino
- Born: June 13, 2005 (age 21)
- Hometown: Catmon, Cebu Philippines
- Height: 5 ft 7 in (1.70 m)
- Education: University of the East (2023–2024); University of the Philippines (2026–present)

Volleyball information
- Position: Outside hitter
- Current team: UP Fighting Maroons

Casiey Monique Dongallo (born June 13, 2005) is a Filipino volleyball player. She is currently playing for the UP Fighting Maroons in the UAAP.

== Career ==
=== Collegiate ===
Dongallo made her first game appearance with UE Lady Red Warriors in 2023 V-League Collegiate Challenge where they end-up with a bronze medal.

This was followed by 2023 Shakey's Super League Collegiate Pre-Season Championship where they ended-up in 6th place.

She made her UAAP debut with Lady Red Warriors in UAAP Season 86 women's volleyball.

On 2025, she transferred to UP, but she would be eligible to play for Lady Maroons in Season 88, as she will be serving a one-year residency with the team.

== Awards ==
=== Individual ===
| Year | League | Season/Conference | Award | Ref |
|---|---|---|---|---|
| 2022 | PNVF | Champions League | Most Valuable Player | |
| 2022 | PNVF | Champions League | 2nd Best Outside Hitter | |
| 2023 | SSL | SVIL | Most Valuable Player | |

=== High School ===
(Partial)

| Year | League | Season/Conference | Title | Ref |
|---|---|---|---|---|
| 2022 | PNVF | Champions League | Champion | |
| 2023 | SSL | SVIL | Champion | |

=== Collegiate ===
| Year | League | Season/Conference | Title | Ref |
|---|---|---|---|---|
| 2023 | V-League | Collegiate | 3rd place | |
