= St. Paul College, Pasig =

Roman Catholic school in Pasig, Philippines

St. Paul College Pasig

Location
- St. Paul Road, Brgy. Ugong, Pasig, Metro Manila; Philippines
- 14°34′54″N 121°04′00″E

Information
- Type: Private Roman Catholic all-girls basic education institution
- Motto: Caritas Christi Urget Nos (Latin) ("The charity of Christ impels us")
- Religious affiliation: Roman Catholic (Sisters of St. Paul of Chartres)
- Established: 1970; 56 years ago
- Campus: Urban
- Colors: Green and Gold
- Affiliations: PAASCU
- Website: www.spcpasig.edu.ph

St. Paul College, Pasig, also referred to as SPCP or SPC Pasig, is a private, Roman Catholic school exclusively for girls in Pasig, Philippines run by the Congregation of Sisters of St. Paul of Chartres (SPC), a teaching order founded as the Daughters of the School. It is one of the 40 schools owned, managed, and operated by the Sisters of St. Paul of Chartres (SPC) in the Philippines.

St. Paul College, Pasig, is located in St. Paul Road, Brgy. Ugong, Pasig, Philippines. It was established in 1970 when St. Paul University Manila (then St. Paul College, Manila and currently one of the seven campuses comprising the St. Paul University System) decided to relocate their kindergarten, grade school and high school departments to a different area.

== History ==
The Sisters of St. Paul of Chartres first arrived in the Philippines on October 29, 1904, on the invitation of Bishop Frederick Z. Rooker of Jaro, Iloilo to open a school in Dumaguete for the "protection of faith". Other invitations followed and more Sisters arrived for a hospital in Iloilo, schools in Vigan, Tuguegarao, and Manila, and a leprosarium in Culion.

The Congregation is now serving forty schools all over the Philippines aside from hospitals and pastoral communities.

== Administration ==
=== Directresses ===
- Sister Marie Marcelle Navarro, SPC (1979-1982)
- Sister Mary Magdalen Torres, SPC (1982-1995)
- Sister Teresita Baricaua, SPC (1995-1997, as acting directress; 1997–2000, as directress)
- Sister Bernadette Racadio, SPC (2000-2005)
- Sister Teresita Baricaua, SPC (2005-2012)
- Sister Dedicacion Rosario, SPC (2012–2021)
- Sister Felicitas Bernardo, SPC (2021–2025)

Source: Sister Dedicacion Rosario, SPC (2025- represent)

== Notable alumnae ==
- Krissy and Ericka Villongco - music duo
- Sharon Cuneta - actress, singer, daughter of late Mayor Pablo Cuneta
- Cherie Gil - actress, socialite, member of the Eigenmann family
- Janella Salvador - actress, member of the Salvador family of thespians
- Alexa Ilacad - actress
- Emmanuelle Vera - international beauty queen, occasional actress
- Julia Barretto - actress, daughter of Marjorie Barretto and Dennis Padilla
- Gabbi Garcia - actress
- Janine Gutierrez - actress, member of the Gutierrez family
- Lotlot de Leon - actress, daughter of Nora Aunor and Christopher de Leon
- Sheryl Cruz - actress, singer, member of the Cruz family
- Gelli de Belen - actress
- Antoinette Jadaone - filmmaker
- Grace Lee - South Korean-born disc jockey and television host
- Denise Laurel - actress, singer, member of the prominent Laurel family
- Grace Poe - Senator, MTRCB board member, daughter of Susan Roces and Fernando Poe Jr.
- Liezl Martinez - actress, MTRCB board member, daughter of Amalia Fuentes and Romeo Vasquez
- BP Valenzuela - singer
- Belle Mariano - actress
