= Assumption Antipolo =

Roman Catholic school in Rizal, Philippines

Location
- Sumulong Highway, Brgy. Dela Páz, Antipolo, Rizal; Philippines; 14°36′11.3″N 121°10′49.8″E

Information
- Type: Private Non-profit; Roman Catholic All-girls; Basic education institution
- Motto: Maria Regina; Mary the Queen
- Religious affiliations: Roman Catholic (Assumption Sisters)
- Established: 1974; 52 years ago
- Founder: Religious of the Assumption
- Principal: Ms. Marie Grace B. Magtaas
- Colors: Gold; White; Blue
- Affiliation: PAASCU DACSA, CEAP, ACUP APSA CEM
- Website: assumptionantipolo.edu.ph

Assumption Antipolo (abbreviated: AA) is a private, Catholic, all-girls basic education institution run by the Religious of the Assumption in the city of Antipolo, Rizal, Philippines. The institution was established by the Assumption sisters in 1974.

== History ==
=== Early history ===
Sister Marie Eugénie Milleret de Brou (later canonised as Saint Marie-Eugénie de Jésus; 1817–1898) established the Congregation of the Religious of the Assumption in Paris on 30 April 1839 as a means to make a Christian transformation of society through education. The order arrived in Spanish colonial Philippines in 1892, and at the request of Queen María Cristina, consort of King Alfonso XII of Spain, they established the Superior Normal School for Women Teachers in Intramuros in 1892 which pioneered women education in the Philippines. Among its first alumnae were Rosa Sevilla de Alvero, Foundress of the Instituto de Mujeres; Librada Avelino, and Carmen de Luna, who founded Centro Escolar University. At the outbreak of the Philippine Revolution of 1896, the order ceased operation of the school and returned to Europe.

=== Herran(Pedro Gil)-Dakota (M. Adriatico) campus ===
At the request of Pope Pius X, a group of anglophone Assumption Sisters returned to Manila in 1904; the Philippine Islands were by then already under American colonial rule. With the group of Sisters were Mother Helen Margaret as Superior, and Mother Rosa María, who subsequently spent most of her religious life in the Religious of the Assumption in Asia. Originally an elementary and secondary school, the College was added in 1940. Its successors are Assumption Antipolo and Assumption College San Lorenzo.

Formerly found in the genteel enclave of Ermita, the school very much resembled the renowned girls’ schools of France and the rest of Europe, becoming a favourite amongst Manila’s pre-War élite. It was considered a school for the alta de sociedad (high society) and there was no other value more emphasised than the French term noblesse oblige: “To whom much is given, much will be required.” The school was once at the corner of Calle Herran and Calle Dakota (now known as Pedro Gil and Adriatico, respectively), beside the old Padre Faura campus of the all-boys' Ateneo de Manila, where the brothers of Assumptionistas often studied. It was from this time when the so-called “Ateneo-Assumption” families sprung up, with entire clans exclusively attending either school. It offered subjects such as Spanish, French, Language and Reading in English, Arithmetic, and Religion, as well as Manners and Penmanship.

During the Second World War, the whole school and the rest of the city were destroyed by heavy aerial bombardment in the 1945 Liberation of Manila. As with many schools, Assumption College resumed classes in quonset huts and in a battered auditorium in the ruins of the Herran campus. Thru Mother Superior Rosa María Pachoud and Mother Ezperanza Ma. "Madam Espot" A. CuUnjieng brought the school back to its feet thru charity fund donation of the Family CuUnjieng Foundation and relaunched it in 1947 when the Reconstruction began, reopening in 1948. The Herran campus officially closed its doors in 1973, and today the Herran campus and the neighboring Ateneo Padre Faura campus are occupied by Robinsons Place Manila.

==== Architecture and culture ====
Assumption Convent had high-ceiling and arcaded school buildings in the neo-Gothic style. The convent school has arched windows and corridors, partly hidden floral medallions, (specifically the fleur-de-lys common to the other French girls' school, Saint Paul University Manila).

The Herran (Pedro Gil) Assumption also featured one of the most impressive school chapels in Manila. Neo-Gothic in design, the chapel featured arched, stained-glass windows and a comparatively small Gothic main altar. Students of the Herran campus still observed older practices of the Catholic Church, with students made to genuflect upon entering any place where the Blessed Sacrament was kept. In those days, students also signed for fifteen-minute shifts for the adoration of the Blessed Sacrament; they were thus excused from any class. In the afternoons, the students with lacy white mantillas on their heads, filled the chapel for common adoration, ending the day with singing the Tantum Ergo.

There were also the very distinct things done within the walls of the school that through the decades would have the virtual label of "Assumption". There were the Assumption tarts (triangular tarts topped with guava jelly), and the Assumption siomai, beloved by students because of how it tasted like those made by Ma Mon Luk, a famous noodle shop. There was also Assumption cottage pie, ground meat topped with mashed potatoes served at the refectory. Students wore the distinct Assumption uniform of a tartan skirt (the fabric of which was supposedly first imported from France), sailor-collared shirts and a pin with a gold-coloured school seal. The lace-filled immaculately white uniforms called "gala dress" were reserved for more formal occasions such as Mass and Graduation Rites. Visiting guests had to contend themselves of speaking with the students in a parlour.

Girls played a ball game they called bataille and were taught to curtsey before nuns, specifically the Mother Superior whom they were taught to address as "Notre Mère" ("our mother"). A hallmark of an "Old Girl" is the school's penmanship known as "Assumption Script". Letters are distinctly long with sharp elongated points, it is a precise cursive, with flourished majuscules and jagged tails. It was a source of pride, according to Gonzales, and a way of immediately identifying an Herran Assumptionista.

=== Herran closure and San Lorenzo-Antipolo transfers ===
The school then expanded to its San Lorenzo, Makati campus, welcoming 180 students into its preparatory and elementary levels in June 1958. The following year, Assumption College San Lorenzo opened its doors to college-bound young women, and the College moved there in 1959.

After some time, the Herran campus was sold as the area was becoming a commercial and tourist centre not conducive to learning. In 1972-73, four San Lorenzo campus teachers were transferred to pave the way for merging elementary schools and secondary schools of Herran and San Lorenzo. In 1973-74, the Herran and San Lorenzo schools fused: the High School and the College were based in San Lorenzo while the Preschool and Grade School briefly occupied Herran, temporarily moving to San Lorenzo in June 1974.

The Grade School finally resettled as Assumption Antipolo along Sumulong Highway on 11 September 1974, with the Preschool staying in San Lorenzo. Assumption Antipolo, on the other hand, had its Preschool, to which it added a Kindergarten level in 1984. A High School was opened for First Year in school year 1987-88. The High School completed its four levels and had its first commencement exercises in March 1991.

The Antipolo school site also houses a Center for Service and Sharing (CSS), two Retreat houses for spiritual and social formation, the office of the Philippine Council for Peace and Global Education and PACEM that maintains an Ecology Park. With the completion of the basic education department and the stability of the school as an institution, AA became a corporation on its own in June 1997.

== Response to the Church ==
In line with the spirit of Vatican II and in response to the call of the Church in the Philippines at the Second Plenary Council of the Philippines and the needs of the country, the Assumption in the Philippines has moved towards the rural areas and the underprivileged sector, without abandoning the education of the upper/middle classes. The majority of its schools, campus ministries, and community development works are now among farmers, tribal minorities, and the urban poor.

== Elementary programs ==
- Christian Living Education and Alay Kapwa at Kalikasan
- English
- Mathematics
- Science
- Wika at Kulturang Pilipino
- Filipino
- Araling Panlipunan
- Music
- Computer Education
- Homeroom
- Art
- Home Economics
- Physical Education (PE)
- Environmental Education/AKK

== High school programs ==
Junior High School:

- Christian Living Education
- Homeroom
- Alay Kapwa
- English
- Filipino
- Mathematics
  - Algebra
  - Statistics
  - Geometry
  - Trigonometry
- Science
  - Lecture (Modular)
    - Earth Science
    - Biology
    - Chemistry
    - Physics
  - Laboratory
  - Investigatory Project
- Araling Panlipunan
- PEHM:
  - Physical Education
  - Health
  - Music
- Technology & Home Economics (THE)
- Computer Education

Senior High School: General Academic Strand with Electives in ABM/Arts and Design/HUMSS/STEM

- 21st Century Literature
- Alay Kapwa
- Applied Economics
- Catholic Social Teaching
- Christian Living Education
- Christian Philosophy
- Contemporary Philippine Arts in the Regions
- Creative Non-Fiction
- Creative Writing
- Disaster Readiness and Risk Reduction
- Discipline and Ideas in the Social Sciences
- Earth and Life Science
- Empowerment Technology
- English for Academic and Professional Purposes
- Entrepreneurship
- Filipino sa Piling Larangan
- French
- General Mathematics
- Homeroom
- Inquiries, Investigations, and Immersion
- Komunikasyon at Pananaliksik
- Media and Information Literacy
- Oral Communication
- Organization and Management
- Pagbasa at Pagsusuri ng Iba't Ibang Teksto Tungo sa Pananaliksik
- Personal Development
- Physical Education and Health
- Physical Science
- Practical Research 1
- Practical Research 2
- Reading and Writing
- Statistics and Probability
- Understanding Culture, Society, and Politics
- Work Immersion

Electives

- ABM (Accountancy, Business, and Management)
  - Business Math
  - Business Finance
  - Fundamentals of Accountancy, Business, and Management 1
  - Fundamentals of Accountancy, Business, and Management 2
- Arts and Design
  - Creative Industries I: Arts and Design Appreciation and Production
  - Creative Industries II: Performing Arts
  - Integrating the Elements and Principles of Organization in the Arts
  - Leadership and Management in Different Arts Fields
- HUMSS (Humanities and Social Sciences)
  - Discipline and Ideas in the Applied Social Sciences
  - Introduction to World Religions and Belief Systems
  - Philippine Politics and Governance
  - Trends, Networks, and Critical Thinking in the 21st Century Culture
- STEM (Science, Technology, Engineering, and Mathematics)
  - Basic Calculus
  - General Biology
  - General Chemistry
  - General Physics

 

== Traditions ==
- Kapatiran (Seniors welcoming the Grade 7)
- Clothing Ceremony (The Year 12 "clothing" the Grade 11 with the Gala Collar)
- Vigil and Dawn Mass (before Christmas vacation)
- Handog Pasasalamat (before Christmas vacation)
- Annual School Fair and Variety Show (after Christmas vacation, in January or February)
- Monthly Medical Dental Mission led by the Grade 10
- Grade 11 Benefit Dinner (January or February)
- Seniors Legacy Night (before school year ends)

== Student organizations ==
High School

- Student Council of Assumption Antipolo (SCAA)
- Youth Ministry of Assumption Antipolo (YMAA)
- Assumption Antipolo Dance Crew (AADC)
- Plaid Ideas (Student Newspaper)
- Memoirs (Yearbook)
- Komusikasyon (High School Choral Group)
- Pamulatan (Theatre Club)
- TIERRA (Ecology Club)
- Salinmusika (Philippine Instruments Club)
- Yearbook Club (School Yearbook)
- Protinus Anima (Animation Club)
- High School Dance Club
- Film Club
- Sports Clubs (Football, Badminton, Lawn Tennis, Table Tennis, Swimming, Basketball, Volleyball, Frisbee, Handball, etc.)

Grade School

- Junior Student Council of Assumption Antipolo (JSCAA)
- Pamuso (Grade School Choral Group)
- Assumption's Children's Theater (ACT CLUB/Acting Club)

== Athletics ==
- GS Basketball Varsity
- HS Basketball Varsity
- Football Varsity
- Softball Varsity
- Swimming Varsity
- Volleyball Varsity
- Badminton Varsity
- Dance Varsity
- Pep Squad

== Affiliations ==
- ACUP – Association of Catholic Universities of the Philippines
- APSA – Association of Private Schools and Administrators
- CEAP – Catholic Educational Association of the Philippines
- CEM – Center for Educational Measurement
- PAASCU – Philippine Accrediting Association of Schools, Colleges and Universities

== Notable alumnae ==
- Pia Arcangel – Newsreader, GMA 7
- Cory Vidanes – Channel Head, ABS-CBN
- Bianca Pagdanganan – Professional golfer

== Sources ==
- Assumption Antipolo
- Assumption Antipolo Student Handbook
