= California Precision Sports =

Women's volleyball team in the Philippines

- Full name: California Precision Sports–Antipolo
- Short name: CPS
- Founded: 2018
- League: PNVF Champions League
- 2022: Champions
- Website: www.caleducation.org

California Precision Sports (CPS) is a women's volleyball team. It is a program by the California Academy (CAL) based in Antipolo, Rizal.

== History ==
California Precision Sports was founded in June 2018 as the grassroots volleyball program of the California Academy (CAL) system, attracting Filipino female youth from all over the Philippines.

The team has represented Antipolo in two editions of the PNVF Champions League. They debuted in the inaugural edition in 2021 in Lipa, Batangas. The high-school laden team was noted for being able to compete against professional teams in that edition. They returned for the 2022 edition where they clinched the title at the expense of the University of the East in Manila.

In March 2023, the team won the PNVF Under-18 Championships title.

== Honors ==
=== PNVF Champions League ===
Year	Placement	Ref
2021	5th place	
2022	Champions	

=== Individual ===
Season	Tournament	Award	Name	Source
2022	PNVF Champions League	Most Valuable Player	Casiey Dongallo	
2022	PNVF Champions League	2nd Best Outside Spiker	Casiey Dongallo	
2022	PNVF Champions League	Best Middle Blockers	Jenalyn Umayam	
2022	PNVF Champions League	Best Opposite Spiker	Jelaica Gajero	
