= Zobel Junior Archers and Lady Junior Archers =

Varsity team

- School: De La Salle Santiago Zobel School
- League: UAAP, WNCAA
- Joined: 1986
- Location: University Avenue, Ayala Alabang Village, Muntinlupa, Metro Manila
- Team colors: Green, gold, and white

Juniors' general championships
- UAAP: none; WNCAA: 9 (1993–94, 1994–95, 1995–96, 1996–97, 1997-98, 1998–99, 1999–2000, 2000–01, 2004–05)

The Zobel Junior Archers and Lady Junior Archers (officially the De La Salle Zobel Junior Archers and Lady Junior Archers) are the varsity teams of De La Salle Santiago Zobel School. The Junior Archers are the male Juniors team of De La Salle University's De La Salle Green Archers in the University Athletic Association of the Philippines, while its girls' team, the Lady Junior Archers, are De La Salle–College of Saint Benilde's female Juniors team at the Women's National Collegiate Athletic Association.

== History ==
De La Salle Santiago Zobel's varsity team was first officially known as the "Golden Bengals," with its mascot being the Fighting Bengal. This identity was designed and proposed by Brother Raymond Bronowicz FSC, who was the first Brother-Director of the school at that time. He decided that the school should adopt its own unique identity per the practice of the different De La Salle schools at that time: La Salle Green Hills were the Rangers and De La Salle Lipa were the Dragons then the Stallions. The adoption of a new mascot was not welcomed by the studentry since a majority came from the grade school in the main campus in Manila and they were used to having an Archer moniker as the former, now defunct, De La Salle College High School's De La Salle Greenies was.

In 1997, the Board of Trustees of the school, led by its then President-Mr. Lamberto de Ocampo, elected to officially call De La Salle Zobel's varsity team as the Junior Archers.

== History with the UAAP ==
The Junior Archers, together with the De La Salle Green Archers, joined the University Athletic Association of the Philippines in 1986, when De La Salle University picked De La Salle Santiago Zobel School to be its representative in the Junior (High School) division. De La Salle Zobel was chosen, despite La Salle Green Hills being DLSU's junior representative in the NCAA from 1968 to 1981, because the school was at that time was considered a satellite campus of DLSU while LSGH was a completely independent corporate entity.

From the time that the Junior Archers joined the UAAP in 1986 until it won its very first basketball championship in Season 68 (2005–06), the Junior Archers' achievements were considered to be moderate at best. The team never finished last.

During UAAP Season 68 (2005–06), the Junior Archers won its first UAAP Juniors basketball title when it swept the UPIS Junior Maroons, 2–0. It was also De La Salle's first Juniors title in either the NCAA or the UAAP since 1955, when the De La Salle Greenies of the then existing De La Salle College High School in Taft Avenue, Manila led by De La Salle basketball great—Kurt Bachmann, won 1955 NCAA Junior Basketball championship.

After its year-long suspension in UAAP Season 69 (2006–07) due to the ineligibility scandal that rocked the whole Lasallian community, the Junior Archers, together with their seniors counterparts the De La Salle Green Archers, won the "double championship" in men's basketball the next season. The Junior Archers swept the defending champions Ateneo de Manila Blue Eaglets to claim their second juniors basketball title in three years.

In the Season 71 of the UAAP, the Junior Archers were the favorites to win their third straight UAAP Juniors Basketball Championship. DLSZ finished second in the standings behind the Ateneo de Manila Blue Eaglets and gained a twice-to-beat advantage and to face the FEU-FERN Baby Tamaraws. Unfortunately, the Baby Tamaraws surprised and swept the two-time defending champions eliminating them as they failed to defend their crown.

The Junior Archers would return to the finals in Season 72, finishing atop the team standings with a 12–2 record and then avenged last year's final four loss to the Baby Tamaraws. However, in the finals, they fell in a hard-fought three-game series to the defending champions Ateneo Blue Eaglets.

Despite having a young roster for Season 73, the Junior Archers still overachieved with a 7–7 record, finishing in a tie for fourth. They would defeat the FEU-FERN Baby Tamaraws in the fourth-place playoff to qualify for the step-ladder phase (the Blue Eaglets finished the season undefeated after 14 games). They then upset the NU Bullpups in a low-scoring affair before bowing to the UST Tiger Cubs in the second step-ladder phase.

In the spirit of De La Salle Philippines's "One La Salle"(all 18-La Salle campuses in the Philippines are under De La Salle Philippines. Inc. headed by Brother Armin Luistro FSC who is also concurrently the President of De La Salle University-Manila), the La Salle Greenies are currently CSB's juniors reps in the NCAA while the Zobel Junior Archers are DLSU's juniors reps in the UAAP.

== Basketball ==
(2018) With 4 veterans and 12 rookies, the Junior Archer are young but opt to prove that they have the caliber to be in the Final Four after 2017's team fell short.

De La Salle Zobel Junior Archers

No.	Name	Position	Height	Playing Year	HS Gr.	Grade School
0	Alonzo Luna	PF	6' 3"	R	9	Colegio San Agustin Makati
1	Ivan Cudiamat	SG/SF	6'1	R	11	Colegio San Juan De Letran
4	Pauloh Villarin	SG	5'11	R	10	Colegio San Juan De Letran
6	Raven Cortez	C	6' 7"	2	10	NU Nazareth
8	Guilbert Dee	SG	6'1	R	12	Elizabeth Seton School
9	Lance Jomalesa	SF/PF	6'0	R	12	San Beda
12	Migs Pascual	PG/SG	5'11	2	11	San Beda
15	Jose Milan	C	6' 3"	R	11	Elizabeth Seton School
18	Em-Em Danao	PG	5'5	R	9	De La Salle Zobel
21	Nat Sevilla	C	6' 3"	R	9	San Sebastian
22	Enzo Buncayo	PG	5'8	2	9	Mapua
23	Leonard Maraña	SG/SF	5'10	R	10	San Beda
24	Jac Macasaet	SG/SF	6' 0"	R	10	Lourdes School
27	Raki Lintag	PG (C)	5'3	2	9	BLC International School
28	Allen Pingol	PG	5'11	R	10	Tomas Del Rosario College
89	Ranz Unisa	PG/SG	5'7	R	10	Saint Bernadette College of Alabang

=== Coaching Staff ===
- Head coach: Boris Aldeguer
- Assistant coaches:
  - Warren Capitan
  - Gian Nazario
  - Jerry Andaleon
  - Mac Bautista
  - Arfenee Laureaga
  - Anton Arevalo

== DLSZ Juniors Football Team Roster (A.Y. 2013-2014) ==
#	Last Name	First Name	Playing Year	HS Year	Position
1	Wintermahr	Lukas	3	4th	Goalkeeper
2	Carlos	Andrei	1	2nd	Defender
3	Montelibano	Alfonso	4	4th	Defender
4	Rocha	Jeremiah	4	4th	Defender
5	Mariano	David	2	3rd	Defender
6	Maniquis	Andoni	4	4th	Midfielder
7	Reyes	Rae	2	3rd	Defender
8	Hillerstam	Marco	1	4th	Forward
9	Longa	Joshua	3	3rd	Forward
10	San Diego	Trent	3	3rd	Winger
12	Montenegro	Lance	4	4th	Midfielder
16	Bunyi	Jaime	2	3rd	Winger
17	Pedrosa	Alfonso	2	4th	Forward
18	Tabberrah	Davy	4	4th	Winger
21	Lopez	Eduardo	2	2nd	Midfielder
23	Narciso	Rafael	1	2nd	Defender
25	Coscolluela	Javi	2	4th	Goalkeeper
26	Araneta	Baltie	1	4th	Winger
19	Ibana	Marco	1	1st	Forward

== History with the WNCAA ==
The De La Salle Lady Junior Archers have been the WNCAA Junior Division Champions for eight straight years, from 1993 to 2000 and again in 2004. In contrast to their men's junior counterparts, DLSZ represents College of St. Benilde in the WNCAA since the NCAA didn't have women's basketball in their scheme.

#	Last Name	First Name	Eligibility	Position
7	Caldo	Maria Angelica	4th Year	Guard
8	Roxas	Jaime Marie	3rd Year	Center
9	Razon	Sam	4th Year	Guard
10	Borda	Maria Ruela	2nd year	Forward/Center
11	Morillo	Bernadette	2nd year	Guard
12	Morillo	Bernice	4th year	Guard/Forward
13	Domingo	Justine	1st year	Guard
14	Nuñez	Kathleen Therese	4th year	Guard
15	Jajurie	Jodie Azra	3rd year	Forward/Center
17	Teo	Kristine	2nd year	Forward/Center
18	Nonato	Margaux	2nd year	Guard

== Varsity teams ==
Teams of the following sports carry the moniker of Junior Archers or Lady Junior Archers:

- Badminton
- Baseball
- Basketball
- Chess
- Football
- Fencing
- Futsal
- Lawn Tennis
- Softball
- Table Tennis
- Taekwondo
- Track and Field
- Volleyball
- Mixed Martial Arts
- Triathlon
