= FEU–D Baby Tamaraws =

Varsity team

FEU–Diliman Baby Tamaraws
- School: Far Eastern University–Diliman
- League: UAAP
- Joined: 1938
- Location: Nicanor B. Reyes, Manila (Srs.); Diliman, Quezon City (Jrs.)
- Team colors: Green and gold

Juniors' general championships
- UAAP: none

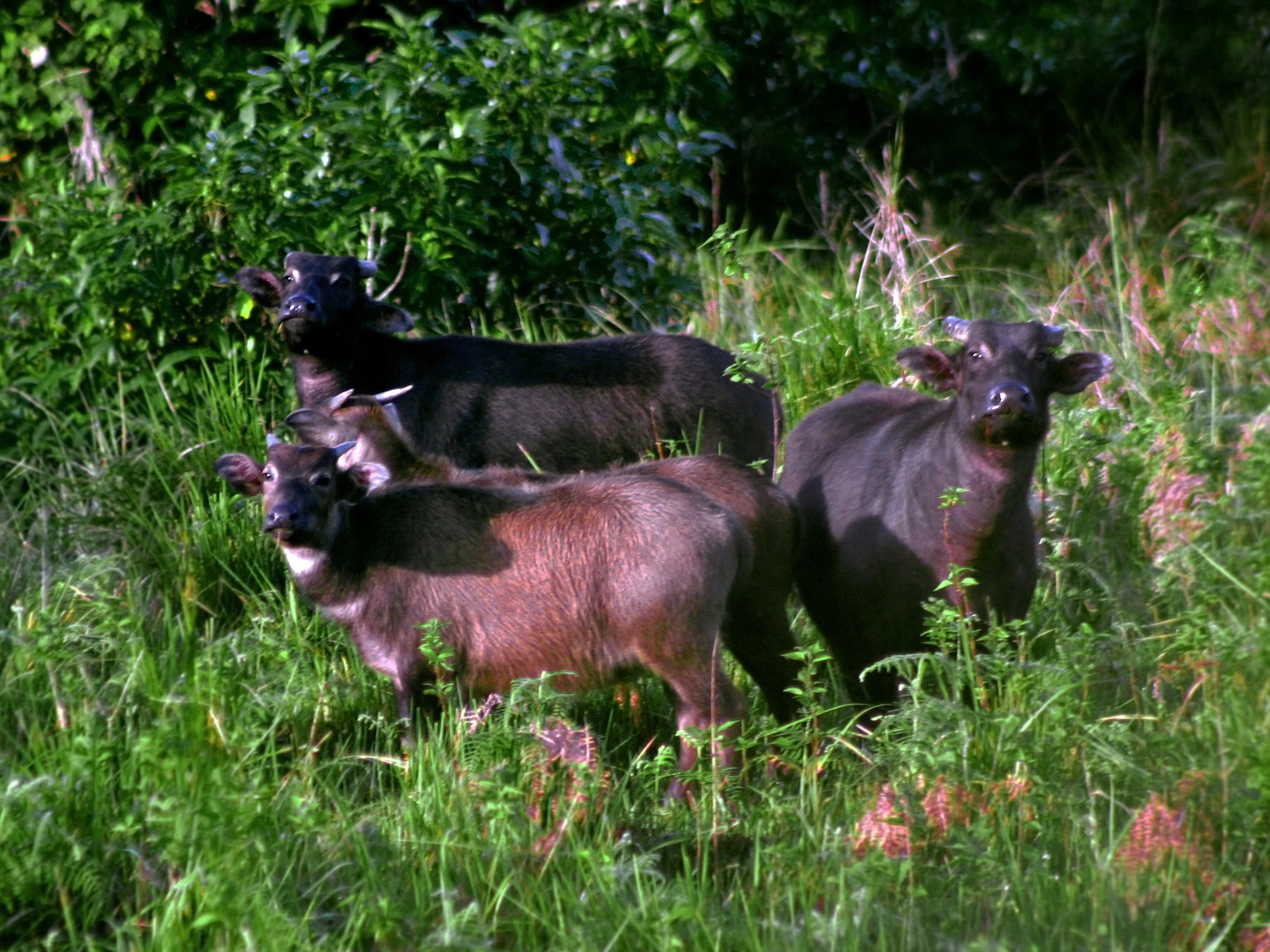
Baby Tamaraws in wild

The FEU–Diliman Baby Tamaraws are the high school varsity team of Far Eastern University Diliman in the University Athletic Association of the Philippines (UAAP), where they play together with the Far Eastern University senior teams, the FEU Tamaraws and Lady Tamaraws.

Prior to UAAP Season 68 (2005–06), the Baby Tamaraws were represented by FEU's high school division in Manila. But after FEU initially dissolved its Manila high school, representation of the Baby Tamaraws was transferred to the then-FEU FERN College in Diliman, Quezon City effective in 2005. FEU eventually reestablished its high school department in Manila in 2016, but the Baby Tamaraws continue to be represented by FEU Diliman.

== Championship Tally ==
The FEU-Diliman Baby Tamaraws participate in six out of eleven sports in the UAAP Junior's Division (as of UAAP Season 77). Below are the total number of championships won in the UAAP (combined boys and girls, where applicable).

1st semester events	Total	2nd semester events	Total
Basketball	5	Football	11
Volleyball	1	Chess	2
Taekwondo	0	Fencing	0

== The Tamaraw and Team colors ==
Green and gold, the school colors of FEU

The Tamaraw is the mascot of all FEU varsity athletic teams. It is the pet name of every FEU student (Tams). Known scientifically as "Bubalus mindorensis", it is a rare animal found only in the island of Mindoro. The Tamaraw is one of the most intelligent, pugnacious, and aggressive of Philippine animal species. The university colors are green and gold. Gold represents the golden opportunity for the university to serve the youth and for her alumni to serve the country. Green is for hope, representing the founder's "fair hope of the fatherland."

== Ranking ==
The following UAAP events are participated in by FEU-Diliman. These events are the seasons wherein the UAAP had eight participating universities, which is based on latest event formats implemented on each particular event until the current season:

Season	BOYS'									GIRLS'	
Season	Basketball	Volleyball	Swimming	Chess	Table tennis	Football	Taekwondo	Track and field	Judo	Volleyball	Swimming
50th	1st	-	-	-	-	-	-	-	-	-	-
59th	8th	-	-	7th	-	-	-	-	-	-	-
68th	4th	-	-	-	-	-	-	-	-	-	-
69th	2nd	-	-	6th	-	5th	5th	-	-	-	-
70th	3rd	-	-	6th	-	3rd	4th	4th	-	-	-
71st	2nd	-	-	4th	-	3rd	4th	4th	-	-	-
72nd	4th	-	-	?	-	?	2nd	?	-	-	-
73rd	5th	-	-	1st	-	1st	3rd	-	-	-	
74th	2nd					1st					
75th	1st			1st		1st	3rd				
76th	3rd					1st					

== Basketball ==
=== Pre – UAAP Season 78 (A.Y. 2015–16) Team Rosters ===
The Baby Tamaraws Basketball Team Roster

No.	Name	Position	Height	Weight	Play Yr.	Grade school
4	Carl John S. Lumba	F				Holy Angel University – Pampanga
5	David Completo	F				
7	Wendelino Comboy	G				
8	John Sergio T. Domingo	G				
9	Jun Gabane	G				
10	John Jose T. Domingo	G				
11	Brandrey Bienes	C				
12	Calvin Nico Cano	F				
14	Danjo Tolentino	F				
15	Scottie Tabudio	F				
16	Christian Fajarito	F				
17	Kenneth Ardiente	C				
18	Ivan Pineda	G				
20	Adriyan Rowen S. Rumbaoa	F				
22	Bien Benin	F				
22	Daniel John R. Paglinawan	G				
24	Jerome Dometita	G				
25	Xyrus Dane C. Torres	G				University of the Assumption – Pampanga
26	Sean Garcia	F				

=== Coaching staff ===
- Head coach: Michael Oliver
- Assistant coaches:
  - Ronald Magtulis
  - Allan Albano
  - Richard Delarosa
  - Carlo Manso

== Notable Baby Tamaraw Alumni ==
Johnny Abarrientos	PBA's 25 Greatest Players of All-Time, PBA Most Valuable Player.
Raymond Valenzona	Coach of the 5-Peat San Sebastian Staglets
Joko Diaz	TV Actor and Movie Actor.
Pacquito Diaz	TV Actor and Movie Actor. Played for Ateneo Blue Eagles
Romy Diaz	TV Actor and Movie Actor. Played for FEU Tamaraws
Mark Lopez	Played for the UP Fighting Maroons, RP-Youth National Team member.
JR Cawaling	Played for the FEU Tamaraws, Rookie of the Year Men's Basketball Tournament – UAAP Season 70
Elyzar "Jolas" Paguia	A housemate from Pinoy Big Brother: Teen Edition Plus. Currently playing for EAC Generals
Raphael Mangahas	2005 UAAP Juniors Rookie of the Year
Terrence Romeo	UAAP Season 72 Juniors MVP (37.1ppg 4.1apg 4.0spg). UAAP Season 76 Seniors MVP (22.2ppg 3.9apg 1.75spg). Scored UAAP Juniors Record 83pts (35 in the 3rd quarter).
Cris Michael Tolomia	Played for the FEU Tamaraws, RP-Youth U-18 National Team member.
Russel Escoto	Played for the FEU Tamaraws, RP-Youth U-18 National Team member.
Jonathan Banal	Playing for the Mapua Cardinals in the NCAA.
Shane Ko	Playing for the Lyceum Pirates in the NCAA.
RJ Argamino	Playing for the CSB Blazers in the NCAA.
Anthony Paulino	Playing for the UPHSD Altas in the NCAA.
Russel Yaya	Playing for the EAC Generals in the NCAA.
Dexter Maiquez	Playing for the SSC-R Stags in the NCAA.
Ian Sangalang	Played for the SSC-R Stags in the NCAA, NCAA Season Most Valuable Player.
Jens Knuttel	Played for the FEU Tamaraws in the UAAP.
Socrates Rivera	Played for the UP Fighting Maroons in the UAAP.
Dexter Rosales	Played for the UP Fighting Maroons in the UAAP.
Mav Bautista	Mav’s Phenomenal.
Theo Libarnes	Called up for the Philippine Mens National Football Team

== See also ==
- Far Eastern University – Nicanor Reyes Educational Foundation
