= UAAP Season 80 football tournaments =

Philippine college football tournament

UAAP Season 80 Football
- Host school: University of Santo Tomas
Men's Finals	G1	Wins
UP Fighting Maroons	1	1
UST Growling Tigers	0	0
- Arena(s): Rizal Memorial Stadium
- Finals MVP: Ian Clarino
- Winning coach: Anto Gonzales
- Semifinalists: Ateneo Blue Eagles, De La Salle Green Archers
- TV network(s): ABS-CBN Sports+Action
Women's Finals	G1	Wins
UST Tigresses	1	0
De La Salle Lady Archers	2	1
- Arena(s): Rizal Memorial Stadium
- Finals MVP: Kyla Inquig
- Winning coach: Hans-Peter Smit
- TV network(s): ABS-CBN Sports+Action
Juniors' Finals	G1	Wins
FEU–D Baby Tamaraws	1	1(4)
DLSZ Junior Archers	1	1(2)
- Arena(s): Rizal Memorial Stadium
- Finals MVP: Gio Pabualan

The UAAP Season 80 seniors division football tournament started on February 3, 2018, with the women's tournament at the Rizal Memorial Stadium in Manila. While the juniors' division started on November 20, 2017 at the PFF National Training Centre inside the San Lazaro Leisure Park in Carmona, Cavite. National University Bullpups made their debut in the juniors' division.

In the finals of the juniors' division, FEU Diliman successfully defended their crown for a record of eight consecutive titles after defeating De La Salle Zobel on penalties, 4–2.

== Venues ==
Carmona	Manila
PFF National Training Centre	Rizal Memorial Stadium
Capacity: 1,200	Capacity: 20,000

== Men's tournament ==
=== Elimination round ===
==== Team standings ====
Pos	Team	Pld	W	D	L	GF	GA	GD	Pts	Qualification
1	UP Fighting Maroons	14	10	4	0	32	6	+26	34	Qualified to the semifinals
2	Ateneo Blue Eagles	14	10	2	2	34	13	+21	32	Qualified to the semifinals
3	UST Growling Tigers	14	7	4	3	23	12	+11	25	Qualified to the semifinals
4	De La Salle Green Archers	14	6	2	6	16	17	−1	20	Qualified to the semifinals
5	UE Red Warriors	14	6	1	7	13	24	−11	19	
6	NU Bulldogs	14	5	1	8	12	15	−3	16	
7	FEU Tamaraws (H)	14	3	4	7	25	27	−2	13	
8	Adamson Soaring Falcons	14	0	0	14	4	45	−41	0	

(H) Hosts

==== First round ====
4 February 2018
09:00 UTC+8

UST Growling Tigers	4-0	FEU Tamaraws
Marvin Bricenio 7' 46' 55'; AJ Pasion 56'	Report

Rizal Memorial Stadium
4 February 2018
13:30 UTC+8

UE Red Warriors	1-0	NU Bulldogs
Jasper Absalon 80'	Report

Rizal Memorial Stadium
4 February 2018
16:00 UTC+8

Ateneo Blue Eagles	0-1	UP Fighting Maroons
	Report	Jeremiah Borlongan 75'

Rizal Memorial Stadium

8 February 2018
09:00 UTC+8

Adamson Soaring Falcons	0-3	UST Growling Tigers
	Report	Dexter Benecio 16' 47'; Marvin Bricenio 67'

Rizal Memorial Stadium
4 February 2018
14:00 UTC+8

UP Fighting Maroons	3-0	UE Red Warriors
Kintaro Miyagi 28' 57'; Jeremiah Borlongan 39'	Report

Rizal Memorial Stadium
4 February 2018
16:00 UTC+8

FEU Tamaraws	1-3	De La Salle Green Archers
Rico Andes 22'	Report	Mathew Custodio 35'; Chris Lawless 77'; Yoshi Koizumi 79'

Rizal Memorial Stadium

11 February 2018
09:00 UTC+8

NU Bulldogs	1-3	Ateneo Blue Eagles
Jekar Sullano 6'	Report	Rupert Baña 31'; Jarvey Gayoso 32'; Jeremiah Rocha 52'

Rizal Memorial Stadium
11 February 2018
13:30 UTC+8

De La Salle Green Archers	2-0	Adamson Soaring Falcons
Christian Zubiri 72'; Marcus Garcia 74'	Report

Rizal Memorial Stadium
11 February 2018
16:00 UTC+8

FEU Tamaraws	0-0	UE Red Warriors
	Report

Rizal Memorial Stadium

15 February 2018
09:00 UTC+8

UP Fighting Maroons	4-1	Adamson Soaring Falcons
Kintaro Miyagi 4' 16'; Jeremiah Borlongan 10' 72'	Report	Jusuel Pilarca 12'

Rizal Memorial Stadium
15 February 2018
14:00 UTC+8

UST Growling Tigers	0-0	NU Bulldogs
	Report

Rizal Memorial Stadium
15 February 2018
16:00 UTC+8

Ateneo Blue Eagles	2-1	De La Salle Green Archers
Jarvey Gayoso 50' 66'	Report	Mauro Acot 33'

Rizal Memorial Stadium

18 February 2018
09:00 UTC+8

NU Bulldogs	1-0	Adamson Soaring Falcons
Patrick Valenzuela 37'	Report	Jusuel Pilarca 12'

Rizal Memorial Stadium
18 February 2018
13:30 UTC+8

FEU Tamaraws	1-1	UP Fighting Maroons
Donggyu Jung 75'	Report	Jeremiah Borlongan 5'

Rizal Memorial Stadium
18 February 2018
16:00 UTC+8

UST Growling Tigers	1-0	Ateneo Blue Eagles
Steven Anotado 77'	Report

Rizal Memorial Stadium

22 February 2018
09:00 UTC+8

UE Red Warriors	2-3	De La Salle Green Archers
Mar Diano 38'; Regil Galaura 40'	Report	Jed Diamante 31'; Chris Lawless 45+1'; Paolo Perez 49'

Rizal Memorial Stadium
22 February 2018
14:00 UTC+8

Adamson Soaring Falcons	0-7	FEU Tamaraws
	Report	Rico Andes 41' 79' 88'; Marole Bungay 44'; Alex Rayos Jr. 58'; Audie Menzi 65'; Harold Alcoresa 85'

Rizal Memorial Stadium
22 February 2018
16:00 UTC+8

NU Bulldogs	0-2	UP Fighting Maroons
	Report	Kintaro Miyagi 23'; Fidel Tacardon 5'

Rizal Memorial Stadium

25 February 2018
09:00 UTC+8

UE Red Warriors	0-5	Ateneo Blue Eagles
	Report	Enzo Ceniza 13'; Jarvey Gayoso 45' 61'; Renko Gaudiel 50'; Ryan Haosen 79'

Rizal Memorial Stadium
25 February 2018
13:30 UTC+8

De La Salle Green Archers	0-2	UST Growling Tigers
	Report	Dexter Benecio 4'; Steven Anotado 31'

Rizal Memorial Stadium
25 February 2018
16:00 UTC+8

FEU Tamaraws	0-2	NU Bulldogs
	Report	Sean Epili 51'; Zyrus Capellan 67'

Rizal Memorial Stadium

1 March 2018
09:00 UTC+8

UP Fighting Maroons	2-0	De La Salle Green Archers
Miguel Clarino 18'; Kintaro Miyagi 87'	Report

Rizal Memorial Stadium
1 March 2018
14:00 UTC+8

Adamson Soaring Falcons	0-2	Ateneo Blue Eagles
	Report	Julian Roxas 4'; Ryan Haosen 90+2'

Rizal Memorial Stadium
1 March 2018
16:00 UTC+8

UST Growling Tigers	0-1	UE Red Warriors
	Report	Kent Galaura 43'

Rizal Memorial Stadium

3 March 2018
14:00 UTC+8

De La Salle Green Archers	0-1	NU Bulldogs
	Report	Jeka Sullano 90+3'

Rizal Memorial Stadium

4 March 2018
09:00 UTC+8

UP Fighting Maroons	1-1	UST Growling Tigers
Jeremiah Borlongan 31'	Report	Javier Bonoan 57' (o.g.)

Rizal Memorial Stadium
4 March 2018
13:30 UTC+8

Ateneo Blue Eagles	4-3	FEU Tamaraws
Jarvey Gayoso 18' 66'; Julian Roxas 73' Ryan Haosen 87'	Report	Gilbert Mendoza 45+2' 45+3' 82'

Rizal Memorial Stadium
4 March 2018
16:00 UTC+8

UE Red Warriors	2-0	Adamson Soaring Falcons
Mark Lerion 43'; Mar Diano 57'	Report

Rizal Memorial Stadium

==== Second round ====
8 March 2018
08:00 UTC+8

Adamson Soaring Falcons	0-2	De La Salle Green Archers
	Report	Jed Diamante 68' (pen.); Chris Lawless 77'

Rizal Memorial Stadium
8 March 2018
14:00 UTC+8

UE Red Warriors	1-3	FEU Tamaraws
Mar Diano 7'	Report	Resty Monterona 70' 73'; Gilbert Mendoza Jr. 85'

Rizal Memorial Stadium
8 March 2018
15:30 UTC+8

Ateneo Blue Eagles	1-0	NU Bulldogs
Jarvey Gayoso 78'	Report

Rizal Memorial Stadium

11 March 2018
08:00 UTC+8

UST Growling Tigers	0-4	UP Fighting Maroons
	Report	Fidel Tacardon 39'; Jeremiah Borlongan 45'; Karl Bugayong 47'; Christian Lapas 58' (p.k.)

Rizal Memorial Stadium
11 March 2018
13:30 UTC+8

De La Salle Green Archers	0-0	Ateneo Blue Eagles
	Report

Rizal Memorial Stadium
11 March 2018
15:30 UTC+8

Adamson Soaring Falcons	0-4	NU Bulldogs
	Report	Lawrence Colina 8' (pen.) 33' 52'; Jeffrey Fabro 86'

Rizal Memorial Stadium

15 March 2018
08:00 UTC+8

Ateneo Blue Eagles	4-0	Adamson Soaring Falcons
	Report	Jarvey Gayoso 9', 18', 32', 36'

Rizal Memorial Stadium
15 March 2018
14:00 UTC+8

UE Red Warriors	0-3	UP Fighting Maroons
	Report

Rizal Memorial Stadium
15 March 2018
16:00 UTC+8

FEU Tamaraws	2-2	UST Growling Tigers
Gilbert Mendoza Jr. 16'; Marole Bungay 90+4' (o.g.)	Report	John Alianza 39'; Arnel Amita 56'

Rizal Memorial Stadium

18 March 2018
08:00 UTC+8

UP Fighting Maroons	2-0	NU Bulldogs
Jeremiah Borlongan 86'; Kintaro Miyagi 87'	Report

Rizal Memorial Stadium
18 March 2018
15:00 UTC+8

Ateneo Blue Eagles	2-0	UST Growling Tigers
Jarvey Gayoso 13'; Koko Gaudiel 86'	Report

Rizal Memorial Stadium
18 March 2018
16:00 UTC+8

De La Salle Green Archers	1-0	FEU Tamaraws
Jeremiah Bernaldez 89'	Report

Rizal Memorial Stadium

22 March 2018
08:00 UTC+8

UST Growling Tigers	5-0	Adamson Soaring Falcons
Steven Anotado 8'; Marvin Bricenio 35'; Ian De Castro 54', 81', 89'	Report

FEU FERN Football Field
22 March 2018
15:00 UTC+8

NU Bulldogs	0-1	UE Red Warriors
	Report	Kent Galaura 76'

FEU Fern Football Field
22 March 2018
16:00 UTC+8

De La Salle Green Archers	0-2	UP Fighting Maroons
	Report	Dane Saavedra 27' (p.k.); John Logarta 82' (o.g.)

FEU Fern Football Field

5 April 2018
14:00 UTC+8

Ateneo Blue Eagles	4-0	UE Red Warriors
Jarvey Gayoso 18', 45?'; Rupert Baña 57'; Sam Lim 60'	Report

Rizal Memorial Stadium
5 April 2018
16:00 UTC+8

Adamson Soaring Falcons	1-5	UP Fighting Maroons
Jusuel Pilarca 89'	Report	Fidel Tacardon 3', 10', 45+2'; Kintaro Miyagi 32'; Karl Bugayong 82'

Rizal Memorial Stadium

8 April 2018
08:00 UTC+8

NU Bulldogs	1-0	FEU Tamaraws
Owen Padernal 72'	Report

FEU FERN Football Field
8 April 2018
13:30 UTC+8

Adamson Soaring Falcons	0-1	UE Red Warriors
	Report	Jasper Absalon 48'

FEU Fern Football Field
22 April 2018
15:30 UTC+8

UST Growling Tigers	1-1	De La Salle Green Archers
Yoshi Koizumi 42'	Report	Ian De Castro 62'

FEU Fern Football Field

12 April 2018
08:00 UTC+8

NU Bulldogs	1-2	De La Salle Green Archers
Simplicio Mantal 32'	Report	Mathew Custodio 12', 62'

Rizal Memorial Stadium
12 April 2018
14:00 UTC+8

UE Red Warriors	1-2	UST Growling Tigers
Kent Galaura 8'	Report	Gino Clarino 55'; John De Castro 88'

Rizal Memorial Stadium
12 April 2018
16:00 UTC+8

UP Fighting Maroons	0-0	FEU Tamaraws
	Report

Rizal Memorial Stadium

15 April 2018
08:00 UTC+8

FEU Tamaraws	4-5	Ateneo Blue Eagles
Marole Bugnay 33'; Gilbert Mendoza Jr. 45'; John Renz Saldivar 55', 90+2'	Report	Koko Gaudiel 5', 41'; Sam Lim 18'; Christian Castillo 54' <nr/> Ryan Haosen 71'

Rizal Memorial Stadium
15 April 2018
15:00 UTC+8

De La Salle Green Archers	1-3	UE Red Warriors
Nicko Villacin 31'	Report	Mar Diano 15', 26'; Mark Lerion 45'

Rizal Memorial Stadium
15 April 2018
17:00 UTC+8

NU Bulldogs	0-2	UST Growling Tigers
	Report	Stephen Anotado 28'; Marvin Bricenio 77'

Rizal Memorial Stadium

19 April 2018
14:00 UTC+8

FEU Tamaraws	2-3	Adamson Soaring Falcons
Jusuel Pilarca 83'; Jesus Cayadong 90+2'	Report	Harold Alcoresa 14', 34'; Arnel Amita 89'

Rizal Memorial Stadium
19 April 2018
16:00 UTC+8

UP Fighting Maroons	2-2	Ateneo Blue Eagles
Julian Clarino 24' (p.k.); Fidel Tacardon 52'	Report	Ryan Haosen 17'; Joshua Laud 88'

Rizal Memorial Stadium

=== Playoffs ===
Semifinals
1	**UP**	**1**
4	La Salle	0
2	Ateneo	0
3	**UST** (a.e.t.)	**1**

Finals
1	**UP**	**1**
3	UST	0

- **Bold** = winner
- * = after extra time, ( ) = penalty shootout score

=== Semifinals ===
April 26, 2018
16:00 UTC+8

UP Fighting Maroons	1–0	De La Salle Green Archers
Kyle Magdato 47'	Report

Rizal Memorial Stadium
April 26, 2018
14:00 UTC+8

Ateneo Blue Eagles	0–1 (a.e.t.)	UST Growling Tigers
	Report	Conrado Dimacali 106'

Rizal Memorial Stadium

=== Finals ===
May 3, 2018
15:00 UTC+8

UP Fighting Maroons	1–0	UST Growling Tigers
Ian Clarino 21'	Report

Rizal Memorial Stadium

=== Awards ===
UAAP Season 80 men's football champions
UP Fighting Maroons
18th title

- Most Valuable Player: Ian Clarino (University of the Philippines)
- Rookie of the Year: Fidel Tacardon (University of the Philippines)
- Best Striker: Jarvey Gayoso (Ateneo De Manila University)
- Best Midfielder: Darius Diamante (De La Salle University)
- Best Defender: Ian Clarino (University of the Philippines)
- Best Goalkeeper: Zaldy Abraham Jr. (University of Santo Tomas)
- Fairplay Award: De La Salle University

== Women's tournament ==
=== Elimination round ===
==== Team standings ====
Pos	Team	Pld	W	D	L	GF	GA	GD	Pts	Qualification
1	UST Tigresses	8	6	1	1	22	10	+12	19	Finals
2	De La Salle Lady Archers	8	5	1	2	9	7	+2	16	Finals
3	FEU Lady Tamaraws (H)	8	3	4	1	10	5	+5	13	
4	Ateneo Lady Eagles	8	2	2	4	7	12	−5	8	
5	UP Lady Maroons	8	0	0	8	5	19	−14	0	

(H) Hosts

==== First round ====
3 February 2018
09:00 UTC+8

UP Lady Maroons	1–3	Ateneo Lady Eagles
Eloisa Malmis 80'	Report	Icee Calimbo 12'; Martie Bautista 24'; Tessa Bernardo 81'

Rizal Memorial Stadium
3 February 2018
14:00 UTC+8

FEU Lady Tamaraws	3–1	UST Tigresses
Jovelle Sudaria 66' (pen.), 87'; Jean Kadil 90+??'	Report	Charise Lemoran 16' (pen.)

Rizal Memorial Stadium

10 February 2018
09:00 UTC+8

Ateneo Lady Eagles	1–2	UST Tigresses
Tessa Bernardo 49'	Report	Shelah Cadag 56'; Charisse Lemoran 65'

Rizal Memorial Stadium
10 February 2018
15:00 UTC+8

UP Lady Maroons	1–3	De La Salle Lady Archers
Red Sajonia 23'	Report	Chelo Hodges 34'; Shannon Arthur 59', 90'

Rizal Memorial Stadium

14 February 2018
09:00 UTC+8

UST Tigresses	1–0	De La Salle Lady Archers
Shelah Cadag 73'	Report

Rizal Memorial Stadium
14 February 2018
15:00 UTC+8

Ateneo Lady Eagles	0–0	FEU Lady Tamaraws
	Report

Rizal Memorial Stadium

17 February 2018
09:00 UTC+8

De La Salle Lady Archers	1–0	FEU Lady Tamaraws
Nicole Andaya 49'	Report

Rizal Memorial Stadium
17 February 2018
15:00 UTC+8

UST Tigresses	3–2	UP Lady Maroons
Hazel Lustan 6'; Mary Indac 39'; Shelah Cadag 45'	Report	Blessie Perez 1'; Alyssa Ube 78'

Rizal Memorial Stadium

24 February 2018
09:00 UTC+8

FEU Lady Tamaraws	2–1	UP Lady Maroons
Aloha Bejic 45', 53'	Report	Cristina Delos Reyes 12' (pen.)

Rizal Memorial Stadium
24 February 2018
15:00 UTC+8

De La Salle Lady Archers	1–0	Ateneo Lady Eagles
Nina Arrieta 37'	Report

Rizal Memorial Stadium

==== Second round ====
28 February 2018
09:00 UTC+8

UP Lady Maroons	0–3	UST Tigresses
	Report	Charise Lemoran 16', 65'; Shelah Cadag 41'

Rizal Memorial Stadium
28 February 2018
15:00 UTC+8

FEU Lady Tamaraws	1–1	Ateneo Lady Eagles
Jovelle Sudaria 38'	Report	Ann Cabrera 35' (pen.)

Rizal Memorial Stadium

3 March 2018
09:00 UTC+8

Ateneo Lady Eagles	0–1	De La Salle Lady Archers
	Report	Kyra Dimaandal 59'

Rizal Memorial Stadium
3 March 2018
15:00 UTC+8

UST Tigresses	1–1	FEU Lady Tamaraws
Nina Yanto 50' (pen.)	Report	Portia Acibar 80'

Rizal Memorial Stadium

10 March 2018
09:00 UTC+8

UP Lady Maroons	0–3	FEU Lady Tamaraws
	Report	Jovelle Sudaria 7'; Aloha Bejic 58', 65'

Rizal Memorial Stadium
10 March 2018
15:00 UTC+8

De La Salle Lady Archers	2–5	UST Tigresses
Shannon Arthur 86'; Kyla Inquig 90+3'	Report	Charise Lemoran 20'; Mary Indac 47'; Shelah Cadag 52', 78'

Rizal Memorial Stadium

14 March 2018
09:00 UTC+8

UST Tigresses	6–1	Ateneo Lady Eagles
Charise Lemoran 39'; Mary Indac 44', 68'; Shelah Cadag 48'; Hazel Lustan 64', 67'	Report	Isabel Villaflor 54'

Rizal Memorial Stadium
14 March 2018
15:00 UTC+8

De La Salle Lady Archers	1–0	UP Lady Maroons
Shannon Arthur 58'	Report

Rizal Memorial Stadium

17 March 2018
09:00 UTC+8

FEU Lady Tamaraws	0–0	De La Salle Lady Archers
	Report

Rizal Memorial Stadium
17 March 2018
15:00 UTC+8

Ateneo Lady Eagles	1–0	UP Lady Maroons
Nona Amoncio 80'	Report

Rizal Memorial Stadium

=== Finals ===
April 5, 2018
16:00 UTC+8

UST Tigresses	1–2	De La Salle Lady Archers
Shelah Cadag 22'		Kyla Inquig 12', 79'

Rizal Memorial Stadium

==== Awards ====
UAAP Season 80 women's football champions
De La Salle Lady Archers
Tenth title, second consecutive title

- Most Valuable Player: Kyla Jan Inquig (De La Salle University)
- Rookie of the Year: Anna Beatrice Delos Reyes (De La Salle University)
- Best Striker: Shelah Mae Cadag (University of Santo Tomas)
- Best Midfielder: Shannon Arthur (De La Salle University)
- Best Defender: Hanna Pachejo (Far Eastern University)
- Best Goalkeeper: Natasha Lacson (De La Salle University)
- Fair Play Award: University of Santo Tomas

== Juniors' tournament ==
=== Elimination round ===
==== Team standings ====
Pos	Team	Pld	W	D	L	GF	GA	GD	Pts	Qualification
1	FEU–D Baby Tamaraws	8	6	1	1	31	4	+27	19	Finals
2	DLSZ Junior Archers	8	5	1	2	31	9	+22	16 (Note: Second-seed playoff: DLSZ 5–3 NU (AET))	Finals
3	NUNS Bullpups	8	5	1	2	24	13	+11	16	Second-seed playoff
4	UST Tiger Cubs	8	1	2	5	4	28	−24	5	
5	Ateneo Blue Eaglets (H)	8	0	1	7	6	42	−36	1	

(H) Hosts

===== Match-up results =====
	Round 1				Round 2			
Team ╲ Game	1	2	3	4	5	6	7	8
AdMU	UST school colors	FEU school colors	NU school colors	La Salle school colors	NU school colors	La Salle school colors	FEU school colors	UST school colors
DLSU	NU school colors	UST school colors	FEU school colors	Ateneo school colors	UST school colors	NU school colors	Ateneo school colors	FEU school colors
FEU	Ateneo school colors	NU school colors	La Salle school colors	UST school colors	UST school colors	NU school colors	Ateneo school colors	La Salle school colors
NU	La Salle school colors	UST school colors	FEU school colors	Ateneo school colors	Ateneo school colors	La Salle school colors	FEU school colors	UST school colors
UST	Ateneo school colors	NU school colors	La Salle school colors	FEU school colors	La Salle school colors	FEU school colors	NU school colors	Ateneo school colors

= Win; = Draw; = Loss

===== Scores =====
Team	AdMU	DLSU	FEU	NU	UST
AdMU		2–4	1–6	1–8	1–2
DLSU	9–1		1–2	2–3	4–0
FEU	9–0	0–2		5–0	0–0
NU	4–0	1–1	0–2		6–1
UST	0–0	0–8	0–7	1–2	

Legend: Blue = left column team win; Yellow = draw; Red = top row team win.

Results to the right and top of the gray cells are first round games,
those to the left and below are second round games.

===== Playoffs =====
January 31, 2018

DLSZ Junior Archers	5–3 (a.e.t.)	NUNS Bullpups
John Rhey Lagura; Sherwin Basindanan; Shanden Vergara; Sherwin Basindanan

Rizal Memorial Stadium

===== Finals =====
February 8, 2018
6:30 p.m.

FEU–D Baby Tamaraws	1–1 (a.e.t.)	DLSZ Junior Archers
Gio Pabualan		Joshua San Diego 41'
Penalties
	4-2

Rizal Memorial Stadium

===== Awards =====
UAAP Season 80 juniors' football champions
FEU–D Baby Tamaraws
Eighth title, eighth consecutive title

- Most Valuable Player: Gio Pabualan (Far Eastern University)
- Rookie of the Year:
- Best Striker: Gio Pabualan (Far Eastern University)
- Best Midfielder: Shanden Vergara (De La Salle Zobel)
- Best Defender: French Talaroc (Far Eastern University)
- Best Goalkeeper: Jason Blanco (Far Eastern University)
- Fair Play Award: Ateneo de Manila University

== Overall Championship points ==
=== Seniors' division ===
Team	Men	Women	Total
Adamson Soaring Falcons	1	-	1
Ateneo Blue Eagles	10	8	18
De La Salle Green Archers	8	15	21
FEU Tamaraws	2	10	12
NU Bulldogs	4	-	4
UE Red Warriors	6		6
UP Fighting Maroons	15	6	21
UST Growling Tigers	12	12	24

=== Juniors' division ===
Team	Boys	Points
FEU–D Baby Tamaraws	15	15
DLSZ Junior Archers	12	12
NUNS Bullpups	10	10
UST Tiger Cubs	8	8
Ateneo Blue Eaglets	6	6

Pts.	Ranking
15	Champion
12	2nd
10	3rd
8	4th
6	5th
4	6th
2	7th
1	8th
—	Did not join
WD	Withdrew

== See also ==
- UAAP Season 79
