= UAAP Season 80 =

University athletic year

- "Go for Great"
- Host school: Far Eastern University

Overall
- Seniors: University of Santo Tomas
- Juniors: University of Santo Tomas

Seniors' champions
Sport		Men	Women
Basketball		Ateneo	NU
Volleyball		NU	La Salle
Beach volleyball		NU	UST
Football		UP	La Salle
Baseball		Adamson	NT
Softball		NT	Adamson
Fencing		UE	UE
Swimming		Ateneo	Ateneo
Badminton		NU	La Salle
Chess		NU	La Salle
Judo		Ateneo; UST	UST
Table tennis		NU	La Salle
Tennis		UE	UST
Track and field		FEU	UST
Taekwondo		NU	NU
- Poomsae: UST (Coed)
- Cheerdance: Adamson (Ex - Coed)
- Street dance: FEU (Ex - Coed)
- Ballroom: Not held (Ex - Coed)

Juniors' champions
Sport		Boys	Girls
Basketball		Ateneo	NT
Volleyball		UST	NU
Football		FEU	NT
Baseball		UST	NT
Fencing		UE	UE
Swimming		UST	La Salle
Judo		UST	UE
Table tennis		NU	UST
Track and field		UE	UE
Taekwondo		UST	NT
- (NT) = No tournament; (DS) = Demonstration Sport; (Ex) = Exhibition;

UAAP Season 80 was the 2017–18 athletic year of the University Athletic Association of the Philippines (UAAP) (UAAP). This season was hosted by the Far Eastern University.

The eight member universities of the UAAP competed in the league's 28 events from 15 sports to vie for the overall championship. This season's sports events included the inaugural 3-on-3 basketball as a demonstration sport held at FEU Manila.

== Reorganization ==
On January 12, 2017, the presidents of the member institutions of the University Athletics Association of the Philippines (UAAP) met in the campus of the host university, the University of Santo Tomas, to discuss the re-organization of the association.

In an interview with the UST Rector, the Very Rev. Herminio V. Dagohoy, O.P., PhD, he said that the group "approved in principle the re-organization of the UAAP." Such entailed that the Presidents/Rectors would become the members of the Board of Trustees, while the present members of the Board of Trustees comprised the Board of Managing Directors, which manage and supervise the UAAP events, like games, among other things.

Created under the proposed change are "risk and audit committees, which will be under the Board of Trustees." Meanwhile, other working committees similar to existing committees were created and placed under the supervision of the board of managing directors.

The proposed amendments to the Articles of Incorporation and By-Laws were submitted to the Securities and Exchange Commission for approval, and were eyed for implementation in time for the opening of the 80th season of UAAP later in 2017.

In August 2017, the UAAP Chairman of the Board of Trustees, Dr. Michael Alba of the Far Eastern University, announced the appointment of Rene Andrei Q. Saguisag, Jr., as the Association's first Executive Director.

== Opening ceremony ==
The opening ceremony of the UAAP Season 80 was held on September 9, 2017 at the Mall of Asia Arena in Pasay City. With the season's theme, "Go for Great", the ceremony gave tribute to its long list of athletic legends.

Started with various performances from students and a live band, the ceremony's highlight was the parade of athletes joined by "UAAP greats" from each school. Among the greats who represented their respective schools were Ateneo's Alyssa Valdez and Rico Villanueva; NU's Danny Ildefonso, Ray Parks and Christine Patrimonio; UP's Ronnie Magsanoc, Joe Lipa, and former varsity volleyball player Congresswoman Pia Cayetano; FEU's Glenn Capacio, Terrence Romeo and Rachel Daquis; UST's Aric del Rosario, Dylan Ababou and Cyrus Baguio; UE's Tisha Abundo; Adamson's Queeny Sabobo, and Ana Santiago; and DLSU's Renren Ritualo and Marielle Benitez.

== Sports calendar ==
This is the calendar of events of the UAAP Season 80. The list includes the tournament host schools and the venues.

=== First semester ===
Sport/Division	Event host	Start date	Venue/s
Ballroom Dancing (demo sport)		Not Held	
Basketball (Men)	Far Eastern University	September 9, 2017	Smart Araneta Coliseum, Mall of Asia Arena
Basketball (Women)	Far Eastern University	September 10, 2017	Smart Araneta Coliseum, Mall of Asia Arena, Blue Eagle Gym
Volleyball (Juniors)	National University	September 9, 2017	FilOil Flying V Centre
Badminton (Seniors)	University of the East	September 21, 2017	Rizal Memorial Badminton Hall
Beach Volleyball (Seniors)	University of Santo Tomas	October 6, 2017	Sands at SM by the Bay
Table Tennis (M/W/B)	University of the Philippines	September 2017	UP Gym
Taekwondo (Kyorugi) (M/W/B)	Ateneo de Manila University	November 15, 2017	Ateneo Blue Eagle Gym
Taekwondo (Poomsae) (M/W/B)	Ateneo de Manila University	November 14, 2017	Ateneo Blue Eagle Gym
Swimming (Srs/Jrs)	University of the Philippines	October 12, 2017	Rizal Memorial Swimming Complex
Judo (Seniors/Juniors)	De La Salle University	November 11, 2017	De La Salle-Zobel Sports Pavilion
Cheerdance	Special Events Committee	December 2, 2017	Mall of Asia Arena

=== Second semester ===
Sport/Division	Event host	Start date	Venue
Basketball (Boys)	Ateneo de Manila	November 11, 2017	Filoil Flying V Centre and Ateneo Blue Eagle Gym
Basketball 3 × 3 (Srs-demo sport)	Far Eastern University	March 4, 2018	SM Mall of Asia Music Hall
Football (Boys)	De La Salle University	November 19, 2017	Rizal Memorial Football Stadium
Football (Seniors)	De La Salle University	Women's - Feb. 3, 2018; Men's - Feb 4, 2018	Rizal Memorial Football Stadium
Baseball (M/B)	Adamson University	Boys' - Jan. 20, 2018; Men's - Feb. 4, 2018	Rizal Memorial Baseball Stadium
Softball (W)	Adamson University	February 1, 2018	Rizal Memorial Baseball Stadium
Volleyball (Seniors)	Far Eastern University	February 3, 2018	Filoil Flying V Centre, Mall of Asia Arena
Chess (Seniors/Juniors)	University of Santo Tomas	February 17, 2018	UST Quadricentennial Pavilion
Fencing (Seniors/Juniors)	University of the East	February 8, 2018	PSC Fenncing Center Philsport Complex Meralco Ave. Pasig
Athletics (Seniors/Juniors)	Adamson University	February 7, 2018	Philsports Arena (Formerly ULTRA) Oval Track
Tennis (Seniors)	National University	Men's - Feb. 3, 2018; Women's - Feb. 4, 2018	Rizal Memorial Tennis Center
Streetdance	De La Salle University	March 11, 2018	Mall of Asia Arena

== Basketball ==
=== Seniors division ===
The UAAP Season 80 seniors division basketball tournament began on September 9, 2017, at the Mall of Asia Arena. The tournament host is Far Eastern University and the tournament commissioner is Rebo Saguisag. The UAAP have adopted FIBA rules on technicals, timeouts, among others. The tournament still used referees from BRASCU for officiating.

==== Men's tournament ====
The primary venues are the Mall of Asia Arena and the Smart Araneta Coliseum. The Filoil Flying V Centre serves as the alternate venue (on the games on October 15 and 22) when the MOA Arena and Araneta Coliseum are unavailable.

===== Elimination round =====
====== Team standings ======
Pos	Team	W	L	PCT	GB	Qualification
1	Ateneo Blue Eagles	13	1	.929	—	Twice-to-beat in the semifinals
2	De La Salle Green Archers	12	2	.857	1	Twice-to-beat in the semifinals
3	Adamson Soaring Falcons	9	5	.643	4	Twice-to-win in the semifinals
4	FEU Tamaraws (H)	7	7	.500	6	Twice-to-win in the semifinals
5	UP Fighting Maroons	6	8	.429	7	
6	NU Bulldogs	5	9	.357	8	
7	UE Red Warriors	3	11	.214	10	
8	UST Growling Tigers	1	13	.071	12	

Source: ABS-CBN Sports
Rules for classification: 1) winning percentage; 2) if tied for #2 or #4, one-game playoff; 3) head-to-head record; 4) head-to-head point differential; 5) overall point differential
(H) Hosts

====== Playoffs ======
Semifinals (Top 2 twice-to-beat)
1	Ateneo	67	88*
4	FEU	80	84
2	La Salle	82
3	Adamson	75

Finals (Best-of-three playoff)
1	Ateneo	76	83	88
2	La Salle	70	92	86

*Overtime

===== Awards =====
- Most Valuable Player: Benoit Mendzana Mbala (De La Salle Green Archers)
- Rookie of the Year: Juan Gerardo S. Gomez de Liaño (UP Fighting Maroons)

==== Women's tournament ====
===== Elimination round =====
====== Team standings ======
Pos	Team	W	L	PCT	GB	Qualification
1	NU Lady Bulldogs	14	0	1.000	—	Advance to the Finals (Note: As NU won all of their elimination round games, the stepladder format will be used instead of the regular Final Four format.)
2	UE Lady Warriors	11	3	.786	3	Twice-to-beat in stepladder round 2
3	UST Growling Tigresses	10	4	.714	4	Proceed to stepladder round 1
4	FEU Lady Tamaraws (H)	8	6	.571	6	Proceed to stepladder round 1
5	Adamson Lady Falcons	6	8	.429	8	
6	Ateneo Lady Eagles	4	10	.286	10	
7	De La Salle Lady Archers	3	11	.214	11	
8	UP Fighting Maroons	0	14	.000	14	

Source: ABS-CBN Sports
Rules for classification: 1) winning percentage; 2) if tied for #2 or #4, one-game playoff; 3) head-to-head record; 4) head-to-head point differential; 5) overall point differential
(H) Hosts

====== Playoffs ======
Stepladder round 1 (Single-elimination)
3	UST	86
4	FEU	72

Stepladder round 2 (No. 2 twice-to-beat)
2	UE	53	69
3	UST	63	62

Finals (Best-of-three playoff)
1	NU	89	79
2	UE	61	68

===== Awards =====
- Most Valuable Player: Jack Danielle Animam (NU Lady Bulldogs)
- Rookie of the Year: Marian Justine Domingo (UP Fighting Maroons)

=== Juniors division ===
==== Elimination round ====
===== Team standings =====
Pos	Team	W	L	PCT	GB	Qualification
1	Ateneo Blue Eaglets	14	0	1.000	—	Advance to the Finals (Note: As Ateneo won all of their elimination round games, the stepladder format will be used instead of the regular Final Four format.)
2	NUNS Bullpups (Note: NU forfeited its first round win over UE after the UAAP Board ruled that NU player Jayson Puray to be ineligible.) (H)	11	3	.786	3	Twice-to-beat in stepladder round 2
3	FEU–D Baby Tamaraws	8	6	.571	6	Proceed to stepladder round 1
4	UST Tiger Cubs	7	7	.500 (Note: Fourth-seed playoff: UST 73–72 Adamson (OT))	7	Proceed to stepladder round 1
5	Adamson Baby Falcons	7	7	.500	7	
6	Zobel Junior Archers	4	10	.286	10	
7	UPIS Junior Fighting Maroons	3	11	.214	11	
8	UE Junior Red Warriors	2	12	.143	12	

Source: ABS-CBN Sports
Rules for classification: 1) winning percentage; 2) if tied for #2 or #4, one-game playoff; 3) head-to-head record; 4) head-to-head point differential; 5) overall point differential
(H) Hosts

==== Playoffs ====
Stepladder round 1 (Single-elimination)
3	FEU–D	80
4	UST	81

Stepladder round 2 (No. 2 twice-to-beat)
2	NSNU	91
4	UST	72

Finals (Best-of-three playoff)
1	Ateneo	86	67	63
2	NSNU	70	70	58

==== Awards ====
- Most Valuable Player: CJ Cansino (UST Tiger Cubs)

== 3×3 basketball ==
The UAAP expanded its number of tournaments by holding 3×3 basketball games in the men's and women's divisions as a demonstration sport in Season 80. The inclusion of 3×3 basketball in the list of UAAP tournaments is timely as 3×3 basketball is now an Olympic event. 3×3 basketball may be reclassified as a regular sport next season after the positive responses from member schools who all fielded a team.

=== Men's tournament ===
==== Group A ====
Pos	Team	W	L	PCT	GB	Qualification	La Salle school colors	UE school colors	Ateneo school colors	Adamson school colors
1	De La Salle Green Archers	2	1	.667 (Note: Head-to-head record: La Salle 1–0 UE)	—	Qualified to the semifinals	—	13–11	10–9	9–11
2	UE Red Warriors	2	1	.667	—	Qualified to the semifinals		—	19–17	18–16
3	Ateneo Blue Eagles	1	2	.333 (Note: Head-to-head record: Ateneo 1–0 Adamson)	1				—	19–16
4	Adamson Soaring Falcons	1	2	.333	1					—

Source: ABS-CBN Sports
Legend: Blue = home team win; Red = away team win.
Rules for classification: 1) winning percentage; 2) head-to-head record; 3) total points for

==== Group B ====
Pos	Team	W	L	PCT	GB	Qualification	NU school colors	FEU school colors	UP school colors
1	NU Bulldogs	1	1	.500 (Note: Total points for: NU 39, FEU 29, UP 27)	—	Qualified to the semifinals	—	20–22	19–17
2	FEU Tamaraws (H)	1	1	.500	—	Qualified to the semifinals		—	7–10
3	UP Fighting Maroons	1	1	.500	—				—

Source: ABS-CBN Sports
Legend: Blue = home team win; Red = away team win.
Rules for classification: 1) winning percentage; 2) head-to-head record; 3) total points for
(H) Hosts

==== Playoffs ====
Semifinals (Single-elimination)
A1	La Salle	12
B2	FEU	15
B1	NU	16
A2	UE	19

Finals (Single-elimination)
B2	FEU	21
A2	UE	13

=== Women's tournament ===
==== Group A ====
Pos	Team	W	L	PCT	GB	Qualification	Adamson school colors	Ateneo school colors	La Salle school colors	UE school colors
1	Adamson Lady Falcons	3	0	1.000	—	Qualified to the semifinals	—	9–7	8–3	16–8
2	Ateneo Lady Eagles	1	2	.333 (Note: Total points for: Ateneo 17, La Salle 14, UE 12)	2	Qualified to the semifinals		—	9–11	8–4
3	De La Salle Lady Archers	1	2	.333	2				—	3–8
4	UE Lady Warriors	1	2	.333	2					—

Source: ABS-CBN Sports
Legend: Blue = home team win; Red = away team win.
Rules for classification: 1) winning percentage; 2) head-to-head record; 3) total points for

==== Group B ====
Pos	Team	W	L	PCT	GB	Qualification	NU school colors	UST school colors	UP school colors	FEU school colors
1	NU Lady Bulldogs	3	0	1.000	—	Qualified to the semifinals	—	14–8	13–6	15–9
2	UST Growling Tigresses	2	1	.667	1	Qualified to the semifinals		—	14–13	12–10
3	UP Fighting Maroons	1	2	.333	2				—	9–7
4	FEU Lady Tamaraws (H)	0	3	.000	3					—

Source: ABS-CBN Sports
Legend: Blue = home team win; Red = away team win.
Rules for classification: 1) winning percentage; 2) head-to-head record; 3) total points for
(H) Hosts

==== Playoffs ====
Semifinals (Single-elimination)
A1	Adamson	15
B2	UST	8
B1	NU	10
A2	Ateneo	5

Finals (Single-elimination)
A1	Adamson	6
B1	NU	15

=== Medalists ===
Event	Gold	Silver	Bronze
Men's team	FEU; Wendel Comboy; Richard Escoto; Kenneth Tuffin; Michael John Casino	UE; Alvin Pasaol; Philip Manalang; Mark Maloles; Jason Varilla	La Salle; NU
Women's team	NU; Jack Animam; Ria Nabalan; Annick Tiky; Afril Bernardino	Adamson; Jonalyn Lacson; Jaime Alcoy; April Cabug; Nathalia Prado	Ateneo; Katrina Guytinco; Nicole Cancio; Jhazmin Joson; Johanne Nîmes / UST; Angelica Anies; Jhenn Angeles; Karla Manuel; Maria Sangalang

== Volleyball ==
=== Seniors' division ===
The UAAP Season 81 seniors division volleyball tournaments began on February 16, 2019. The tournament main venue was the Filoil Flying V Centre in San Juan City while selected games were played at the SM Mall of Asia Arena in Pasay and Smart Araneta Coliseum in Cubao, Quezon City. The tournament host is the National University.

==== Men's tournament ====
===== Elimination round =====
Pos	Team	Pld	W	L	Pts	SW	SL	SR	SPW	SPL	SPR	Qualification
1	NU Bulldogs	14	12	2	35	37	14	2.643	1211	1053	1.150	Twice-to-beat in the semifinals
2	FEU Tamaraws (H)	14	12	2	35	39	16	2.438	1304	1219	1.070	Twice-to-beat in the semifinals
3	Ateneo Blue Eagles	14	11	3	34	36	14	2.571	1207	1070	1.128	Twice-to-win in the semifinals
4	UST Growling Tigers	14	6	8	19 (Note: Fourth-seed playoff: UST 3–2)	24	31	0.774	1215	1210	1.004	Twice-to-win in the semifinals
5	Adamson Soaring Falcons	14	6	8	18	24	26	0.923	1144	1128	1.014	Qualified to fourth-seed playoff
6	De La Salle Green Archers	14	5	9	16	23	29	0.793	1177	1178	0.999	
7	UP Fighting Maroons	14	4	10	11	18	33	0.545	1126	1196	0.941	
8	UE Red Warriors	14	0	14	0	4	42	0.095	809	1139	0.710	

Source: ABS-CBN Sports
Rules for classification: 1) number of wins; 2) if tied for #2 or #4, one-game playoff; 3) match points; 4) sets ratio; 5) points ratio; 6) head-to-head record ratio; 6) points ratio
(H) Host

===== Playoffs =====
Fourth-seed playoff
Adamson	2
UST	3

Semifinals; Top seeds twice-to-beat
1	NU	3
4	UST	0
2	FEU	2	1
3	Ateneo	3	3

Finals; Best-of-three series
1	NU	3	3
3	Ateneo	0	1

===== Awards =====
- Most Valuable Player: Marck Espejo (Ateneo Blue Eagles)
- Rookie of the Year: Ariel Morado Jr. (Ateneo Blue Eagles)

==== Women's tournament ====
===== Elimination round =====
Pos	Team	Pld	W	L	Pts	SW	SL	SR	SPW	SPL	SPR	Qualification
1	De La Salle Lady Archers	14	12	2	34	39	14	2.786	1227	1052	1.166	Twice-to-beat in the semifinals
2	FEU Lady Tamaraws (H)	14	10	4	31	36	20	1.800	1245	1168	1.066	Twice-to-beat in the semifinals
3	Ateneo Lady Eagles	14	9	5	26	32	24	1.333	1225	1173	1.044	Twice-to-win in the semifinals
4	NU Lady Bulldogs	14	7	7	19	25	28	0.893	1134	1188	0.955	Twice-to-win in the semifinals
5	Adamson Lady Falcons	14	6	8	21 (Note: Head-to-head record: Adamson 1–1 UP; Adamson +5)	30	30	1.000	1267	1238	1.023	
6	UP Lady Maroons	14	6	8	16	20	30	0.667	1083	1152	0.940	
7	UST Growling Tigresses	14	4	10	14	20	32	0.625	1156	1161	0.996	
8	UE Lady Warriors	14	2	12	7	15	39	0.385	1047	1252	0.836	

Source: ABS-CBN Sports
Rules for classification: 1) number of wins; 2) if tied for #2 or #4, one-game playoff; 3) match points; 4) sets ratio; 5) points ratio; 6) head-to-head record
(H) Host

====== Playoffs ======
Semifinals (Nos. 1 & 2 have twice-to-beat advantage)
1	La Salle	3
4	NU	0
2	FEU	3
3	Ateneo	1

Finals (Best-of-three series)
1	La Salle	3	3
2	FEU	0	0

===== Awards =====
- Most Valuable Player: Jaja Santiago (NU Lady Bulldogs)
- Rookie of the Year: Milena Alessandrini (UST Growling Tigresses)

=== Juniors' division ===
The UAAP Season 80 Juniors volleyball tournament started on September 9, 2017. National University athletic director Chito Loyzaga and Sports Vision chairman Moying Martelino announced a partnership that resulted in the UAAP Season 80 boys and girls volleyball games being played at FilOil Flying V Centre in San Juan using the facilities of the Premier Volleyball League (PVL). The San Juan venue became the new home of the UAAP high school volleyball. The Adamson gym hosted the competition for three years since 2014. The UAAP wanted a good venue to develop young high school volleyball players. The FilOil Flying V Centre gives young and promising high school volleyball players a venue where they can perform at their very best. For the first time these high school players got a chance to compete on a Taraflex floor.

The girls volleyball matches were played from 12 noon to 4:00 p.m. every Monday and Saturday. The boys matches were held every Wednesday on the same timeslots. On Sundays there were four boys matches starting at 10:00 a.m. and a lone girls game at 8:00 a.m.

National University is the tournament host. The number of participating schools in the boys' and girls' tournaments increased to eight and seven, respectively. Far Eastern University fielded boys' and girls' volleyball teams beginning season 77. Adamson fielded a boys' team starting season 79. Since there would be more than six participating schools in each tournament, both tournaments have a Final Four format. The UAAP Board decided to move the high school volleyball tournaments from 2nd semester to 1st semester in Season 78 due to the basketball juniors tournament being moved from the 1st semester to 2nd semester.

==== Boys' tournament ====
===== Elimination round =====
Pos	Team	Pld	W	L	Pts	SW	SL	SR	SPW	SPL	SPR
1	NSNU Bullpups (H)	3	3	0	9	9	0	MAX	226	155	1.458
2	DLSZ Junior Archers	3	2	1	6	6	3	2.000	193	180	1.072
3	UST Tiger Cubs	3	2	1	6	7	4	1.750	258	212	1.217
4	FEU Baby Tamaraws	2	1	1	3	3	4	0.750	142	164	0.866
5	Adamson Baby Falcons	2	1	1	2	3	5	0.600	168	167	1.006
6	Ateneo Blue Eaglets	3	1	2	4	5	7	0.714	227	268	0.847
7	UE Junior Warriors	2	0	2	0	1	6	0.167	145	170	0.853
8	UPIS Junior Maroons	2	0	2	0	1	6	0.167	130	173	0.751

Rules for classification: Point system: 3 points = win match in 3 or 4 sets; 2 points = win match in 5 sets; 1 point = lose match in 5 sets; 0 point = lose match in 3 or 4 sets
(H) Host

===== Playoffs =====
2nd-seed playoff
3	NU	2
4	UST	3

Semifinals; Top seeds twice-to-beat
1	FEU	3
4	UE	2
2	UST	2	3
3	NU	3	0

Finals; Best-of-three series
1	FEU	1	2
2	UST	3	3

===== Awards =====
- Most Valuable Player: Mark Frederick Calado (FEU–D Baby Tamaraws)
- Rookie of the Year: CJ Segui (UST Tiger Cubs)

==== Girls' tournament ====
===== Elimination round =====
Pos	Team	Pld	W	L	Pts	SW	SL	SR	SPW	SPL	SPR
1	UST Junior Tigresses	8	8	0	24	24	2	12.000	566	414	1.367
2	NSNU Lady Bullpups (H)	6	5	1	15	16	4	4.000	481	354	1.359
3	DLSZ Junior Lady Archers	5	3	2	9	9	8	1.125	389	361	1.078
4	Adamson Lady Baby Falcons	6	2	4	6	8	13	0.615	423	470	0.900
5	UE Junior Amazons	4	1	3	2	4	11	0.364	299	341	0.877
6	FEU–D Lady Baby Tamaraws	5	1	4	4	7	12	0.583	368	410	0.898
7	UPIS Junior Lady Maroons	5	0	5	0	0	15	0.000	199	375	0.531

Rules for classification: Point system: 3 points = win match in 3 or 4 sets; 2 points = win match in 5 sets; 1 point = lose match in 5 sets; 0 point = lose match in 3 or 4 sets
(H) Host

===== Playoffs =====
Semifinals (Nos. 1 & 2 have twice-to-beat advantage)
1	NU	3
4	FEU	1
2	UST	3
3	DLSZ	1

Finals (Best-of-three series)
1	NU	3	3
2	UST	2	0

===== Awards =====
- Most Valuable Player: Mhicaela Belen (NUNS Lady Bullpups)
- Rookie of the Year: Alyssa Jae Solomon (NUNS Lady Bullpups)

== Football ==
The UAAP Season 80 football tournaments started on November 18, 2017 for the juniors division; and on February 3, 2018 for the women's division and the following day for the men's division.

The tournament venue is the Rizal Memorial Stadium. The tournament host is De La Salle University.

=== Seniors division ===
==== Men's tournament ====
===== Elimination round =====
====== Team standings ======
Pos	Team	Pld	W	D	L	GF	GA	GD	Pts	Qualification
1	UP Fighting Maroons	14	10	4	0	32	6	+26	34	Qualified to the semifinals
2	Ateneo Blue Eagles	14	10	2	2	34	13	+21	32	Qualified to the semifinals
3	UST Growling Tigers	14	7	4	3	23	12	+11	25	Qualified to the semifinals
4	De La Salle Green Archers	14	6	2	6	16	17	−1	20	Qualified to the semifinals
5	UE Red Warriors	14	6	1	7	13	24	−11	19	
6	NU Bulldogs	14	5	1	8	12	15	−3	16	
7	FEU Tamaraws (H)	14	3	4	7	25	27	−2	13	
8	Adamson Soaring Falcons	14	0	0	14	4	45	−41	0	

(H) Hosts

====== Match-up results ======
	Round 1							Round 2						
Team ╲ Game	1	2	3	4	5	6	7	8	9	10	11	12	13	14
Adamson	UST school colors	La Salle school colors	UP school colors	NU school colors	FEU school colors	Ateneo school colors	UE school colors	La Salle school colors	NU school colors	Ateneo school colors	UST school colors	UE school colors	UP school colors	FEU school colors
Ateneo	UP school colors	NU school colors	La Salle school colors	UST school colors	UE school colors	Adamson school colors	FEU school colors	NU school colors	La Salle school colors	Adamson school colors	UST school colors	UE school colors	FEU school colors	UP school colors
La Salle	FEU school colors	Adamson school colors	Ateneo school colors	UE school colors	UST school colors	UP school colors	NU school colors	Adamson school colors	Ateneo school colors	FEU school colors	UP school colors	UST school colors	NU school colors	UE school colors
FEU	UST school colors	La Salle school colors	UE school colors	UP school colors	Adamson school colors	NU school colors	Ateneo school colors	UE school colors	UST school colors	La Salle school colors	NU school colors	UP school colors	Ateneo school colors	Adamson school colors
NU	UE school colors	Ateneo school colors	UST school colors	Adamson school colors	UP school colors	FEU school colors	La Salle school colors	Ateneo school colors	Adamson school colors	UP school colors	UE school colors	FEU school colors	La Salle school colors	UST school colors
UE	NU school colors	UP school colors	FEU school colors	La Salle school colors	Ateneo school colors	UST school colors	Adamson school colors	FEU school colors	UP school colors	NU school colors	Ateneo school colors	Adamson school colors	UST school colors	La Salle school colors
UP	Ateneo school colors	UE school colors	Adamson school colors	FEU school colors	NU school colors	La Salle school colors	UST school colors	UST school colors	UE school colors	NU school colors	La Salle school colors	FEU school colors	Adamson school colors	Ateneo school colors
UST	FEU school colors	Adamson school colors	NU school colors	Ateneo school colors	La Salle school colors	UE school colors	UP school colors	UP school colors	FEU school colors	Ateneo school colors	Adamson school colors	La Salle school colors	UE school colors	NU school colors

= Win; = Draw; = Loss

====== Scores ======
Team	AdU	ADMU	DLSU	FEU	NU	UE	UP	UST
Adamson		0–2	0–2	0–7	0–1	0–2	1–4	0–3
Ateneo	4–0		2–1	4–3	3–1	5–0	0–1	0–1
La Salle	2–0	0–0		3–1	0–1	3–2	0–2	0–2
FEU	3–2	4–5	0–1		0–2	0–0	1–1	0–4
NU	4–0	0–1	1–2	1–0		0–1	0–2	0–0
UE	1–0	0–4	3–1	1–3	1–0		0–3	1–0
UP	5–1	2–2	2–0	0–0	2–0	3–0		1–1
UST	5–0	0–2	1–1	2–2	2–0	2–1	0–4	

Legend: Blue = left column team win; Yellow = draw; Red = top row team win.

Results to the right and top of the gray cells are first round games,
those to the left and below are second round games.

===== Playoffs =====
Semifinals
1	**UP**	**1**
4	La Salle	0
2	Ateneo	0
3	**UST** (a.e.t.)	**1**

Finals
1	**UP**	**1**
3	UST	0

- **Bold** = winner
- * = after extra time, ( ) = penalty shootout score

===== Awards =====
- Most Valuable Player: Ian Clarino (UP Fighting Maroons)
- Rookie of the Year: Fidel Tacardon (UP Fighting Maroons)

==== Women's tournament ====
===== Elimination round =====
====== Team standings ======
Pos	Team	Pld	W	D	L	GF	GA	GD	Pts	Qualification
1	UST Growling Tigresses	8	6	1	1	22	10	+12	**19**	Finals
2	De La Salle Lady Archers	8	5	1	2	9	7	+2	**16**	Finals
3	FEU Lady Tamaraws (H)	8	3	4	1	10	5	+5	**13**	
4	Ateneo Lady Eagles	8	2	2	4	7	12	−5	**8**	
5	UP Lady Maroons	8	0	0	8	5	19	−14	**0**	

(H) Hosts

====== Match-up results ======
	Round 1				Round 2			
Team ╲ Game	1	2	3	4	5	6	7	8
Ateneo	UP school colors	UST school colors	FEU school colors	La Salle school colors	FEU school colors	La Salle school colors	UST school colors	UP school colors
La Salle	UP school colors	UST school colors	FEU school colors	Ateneo school colors	Ateneo school colors	UST school colors	UP school colors	FEU school colors
FEU	UST school colors	Ateneo school colors	La Salle school colors	UP school colors	Ateneo school colors	UST school colors	UP school colors	La Salle school colors
UP	Ateneo school colors	La Salle school colors	UST school colors	FEU school colors	UST school colors	FEU school colors	La Salle school colors	Ateneo school colors
UST	FEU school colors	Ateneo school colors	La Salle school colors	UP school colors	UP school colors	FEU school colors	La Salle school colors	Ateneo school colors

= Win; = Draw; = Loss

====== Scores ======
Team	ADMU	DLSU	FEU	UP	UST
Ateneo		0–1	0–0	1–3	1–2
La Salle	1–0		1–0	3–1	0–1
FEU	1–1	0–0		2–1	3–1
UP	0–1	0–1	0–3		2–3
UST	6–1	5–2	1–1	3–0	

Legend: Blue = left column team win; Yellow = draw; Red = top row team win.

Results to the right and top of the gray cells are first round games,
those to the left and below are second round games.

===== Awards =====
- Most Valuable Player: Kyla Jan Inquig (De La Salle Lady Archers)
- Rookie of the Year: Anna Beatrice Delos Reyes (De La Salle Lady Archers)

=== Juniors division ===
The UAAP Season 80 juniors division football tournament started on November 19, 2017. Rizal Memorial Football Stadium and De La Salle Canlubang Football Field are the playing venues. Ateneo is the tournament host. The number of participating schools increased to five from the four teams of season 79. NU fielded a team starting season 80.

==== Boys' Tournament ====
===== Elimination round =====
====== Team standings ======
Pos	Team	Pld	W	D	L	GF	GA	GD	Pts	Qualification
1	FEU–D Baby Tamaraws	8	6	1	1	31	4	+27	**19**	Finals
2	Zobel Junior Archers	8	5	1	2	31	9	+22	**16 (Note: Second-seed playoff: DLSZ 5–3 NU (AET))**	Finals
3	NUNS Bullpups	8	5	1	2	24	13	+11	**16**	Second-seed playoff
4	UST Tiger Cubs	8	1	2	5	4	28	−24	**5**	
5	Ateneo Blue Eaglets (H)	8	0	1	7	6	42	−36	**1**	

(H) Hosts

====== Match-up results ======
	Round 1				Round 2			
Team ╲ Game	1	2	3	4	5	6	7	8
Ateneo	UST school colors	FEU school colors	NU school colors	La Salle school colors	NU school colors	La Salle school colors	FEU school colors	UST school colors
La Salle	NU school colors	UST school colors	FEU school colors	Ateneo school colors	UST school colors	NU school colors	Ateneo school colors	FEU school colors
FEU	Ateneo school colors	NU school colors	La Salle school colors	UST school colors	UST school colors	NU school colors	Ateneo school colors	La Salle school colors
NU	La Salle school colors	UST school colors	FEU school colors	Ateneo school colors	Ateneo school colors	La Salle school colors	FEU school colors	UST school colors
UST	Ateneo school colors	NU school colors	La Salle school colors	FEU school colors	La Salle school colors	FEU school colors	NU school colors	Ateneo school colors

= Win; = Draw; = Loss

====== Scores ======
Team	AdMU	DLSU	FEU	NU	UST
Ateneo		2–4	1–6	1–8	1–2
La Salle	9–1		1–2	2–3	4–0
FEU	9–0	0–2		5–0	0–0
NU	4–0	1–1	0–2		6–1
UST	0–0	0–8	0–7	1–2	

Legend: Blue = left column team win; Yellow = draw; Red = top row team win.

Results to the right and top of the gray cells are first round games,
those to the left and below are second round games.

===== Playoffs =====
January 31, 2018

Zobel Junior Archers	5-3 (a.e.t.)	NUNS Bullpups
John Rhey Lagura; John Rhey Lagura; Sherwin Basindanan; Shanden Vergara; Sherwin Basindanan

Rizal Memorial Stadium

===== Finals =====
February 8, 2018
6:30 p.m.

FEU–D Baby Tamaraws	1-1 (a.e.t.)	Zobel Junior Archers
Gio Pabualan		Joshua San Diego
Penalties
	4-2

Rizal Memorial Stadium

===== Awards =====
- Most Valuable Player: Gio Pabualan (FEU–D Baby Tamaraws)
- Rookie of the Year:
- Best Striker: Gio Pabualan (FEU–D Baby Tamaraws)
- Best Midfielder: Shanden Vergara (Zobel Junior Archers)
- Best Defender: French Talaroc (FEU–D Baby Tamaraws)
- Best Goalkeeper: Jason Blanco (FEU–D Baby Tamaraws)
- Fair Play Award: Ateneo Blue Eaglets

== Baseball ==
The UAAP Season 80 men's division baseball tournament began on February 4, 2018, at the Rizal Memorial Baseball Stadium in Malate Manila. The tournament host is Adamson.

=== Men's tournament ===
==== Elimination round ====
===== Team standings =====
Pos	Team	Pld	W	L	PCT	GB	Qualification
1	De La Salle Green Archers	9	8	1	.889	—	Qualified to the Finals
2	Adamson Soaring Falcons (H)	9	7	2	.778	1	Qualified to the Finals
3	Ateneo Blue Eagles	10	6	4	.600	2.5	
4	UST Growling Tigers	10	4	6	.400	4.5	
5	UP Fighting Maroons	10	2	8	.200	6.5	
6	NU Bulldogs	10	2	8	.200	6.5	

Rules for classification: 1) winning percentage; 2) if tied for #2 or #4, one-game playoff; 3) head-to-head record; 4) head-to-head point differential; 5) overall point differential
(H) Hosts

===== Match-up results =====
	Round 1					Round 2				
Team ╲ Game	1	2	3	4	5	6	7	8	9	10
AdU	La Salle school colors	UP school colors	Ateneo school colors	UST school colors	NU school colors	UST school colors	Ateneo school colors	UP school colors	NU school colors	La Salle school colors
AdMU	UP school colors	NU school colors	Adamson school colors	La Salle school colors	UST school colors	UP school colors	Adamson school colors	NU school colors	La Salle school colors	UST school colors
DLSU	Adamson school colors	UST school colors	NU school colors	Ateneo school colors	UP school colors	NU school colors	UP school colors	UST school colors	Ateneo school colors	Adamson school colors
NU	UST school colors	Ateneo school colors	La Salle school colors	UP school colors	Adamson school colors	La Salle school colors	UST school colors	Adamson school colors	Adamson school colors	UP school colors
UP	Ateneo school colors	Adamson school colors	UST school colors	NU school colors	La Salle school colors	Ateneo school colors	La Salle school colors	Adamson school colors	UST school colors	NU school colors
UST	NU school colors	La Salle school colors	UP school colors	Adamson school colors	Ateneo school colors	Adamson school colors	NU school colors	La Salle school colors	UP school colors	Ateneo school colors

= Win; = Loss

===== Scores =====
Team	AdU	AdMU	DLSU	NU	UP	UST
Adamson		7–3	2–3	2–1	8–5	0–2
Ateneo	3–4		9–6	11–0	13–3	9–6
La Salle	14–5	11–8		17–5	11–4	13–7
NU		3–5	0–6		9–1	8–9
UP		3–1	4–10	16–3		5–9
UST	6–7	7–8	1–11	5–15		

Legend: Blue = left column team win; Red = top row team win.

Results to the right and top of the gray cells are first round games, those to the left and below are second round games. Superscript is the number of innings played before the mercy rule applied.

==== Finals ====
Team 1	Score	Team 2
Adamson Soaring Falcons	14–4	De La Salle Green Archers
Adamson Soaring Falcons	13–6	De La Salle Green Archers

==== Awards ====
- Season Most Valuable Player:
- Finals Most Valuable Player:
- Rookie of the Year:
- Best Pitcher:
- Best Hitter: Marquis Alindogan (Ateneo Blue Eagles)
- Best Slugger:
- Most Runs Batted-In:
- Most Home-runs:
- Most Stolen Bases:

=== Boys' tournament ===
The UAAP Season 80 Boys' division baseball tournament began on January 20, 2018 at the Rizal Memorial Baseball Stadium in Malate Manila. NU fielded a boys' baseball team starting with Season 80. This brought the number of participating teams to four. Since there would be now four teams participating, baseball was longer be a demonstration sport in the Boys' Juniors division. It became a regular sport with the participating schools earning points for the Juniors General Championship. The tournament host is Adamson.

==== Elimination round ====
===== Team standings =====
Pos	Team	Pld	W	L	PCT	GB
1	UST Tiger Cubs	2	2	0	1.000	—
2	Ateneo Blue Eaglets	3	2	1	.667	0.5
3	NUNS Bullpups	2	1	1	.500	1
4	Zobel Junior Archers	3	0	3	.000	2.5

Rules for classification: 1) winning percentage; 2) if tied for #2 or #4, one-game playoff; 3) head-to-head record; 4) head-to-head point differential; 5) overall point differential

===== Match-up results =====
	Round 1			Round 2		
Team ╲ Game	1	2	3	4	5	6
AdMU	NU school colors	UST school colors	La Salle school colors			
DLSZ	UST school colors	NU school colors	Ateneo school colors			
NU	Ateneo school colors	La Salle school colors	UST school colors			
UST	La Salle school colors	Ateneo school colors	NU school colors			

= Win; = Loss

===== Scores =====
Team	AdMU	DLSZ	UST	NU
Ateneo		12–2	4–17	9–8
La Salle			1–12	1–6
UST				
NU				

Legend: Blue = left column team win; Red = top row team win.

Results to the right and top of the gray cells are first round games, those to the left and below are second round games. Superscript is the number of innings played before the mercy rule applied.

==== Finals ====
Team 1	Score	Team 2

==== Awards ====
- Most Valuable Player:
- Rookie of the Year:

== Softball ==
The UAAP Season 80 softball tournament began on February 1, 2018 at the Rizal Memorial Baseball Stadium in Malate Manila. The tournament host is Adamson. Softball is a sport for women only in the UAAP.

=== Women's tournament ===
==== Elimination round ====
===== Team standings =====
Pos	Team	Pld	W	L	PCT	GB	Qualification
1	Adamson Lady Falcons	12	10	2	.833	—	Twice-to-beat in the semifinals
2	UST Growling Tigresses (H)	12	8	4	.667	2	Twice-to-beat in the semifinals
3	UE Lady Warriors	12	7	5	.583	3	Twice-to-win in the semifinals
4	NU Lady Bulldogs	12	7	5	.583	3	Twice-to-win in the semifinals
5	UP Lady Maroons	12	5	7	.417	5	
6	De La Salle Lady Archers	12	4	8	.333	6	
7	Ateneo Lady Eagles	12	1	11	.083	9	

Rules for classification: 1) winning percentage; 2) if tied for #2 or #4, one-game playoff; 3) head-to-head record; 4) head-to-head point differential; 5) overall point differential
(H) Hosts

===== Match-up results =====
	Round 1						Round 2					
Team ╲ Game	1	2	3	4	5	6	7	8	9	10	11	12
Adamson	NU school colors	La Salle school colors	Ateneo school colors	UST school colors	UP school colors	UE school colors	UE school colors	UP school colors	Ateneo school colors	UST school colors	NU school colors	La Salle school colors
Ateneo	UST school colors	UP school colors	UE school colors	Adamson school colors	NU school colors	La Salle school colors	UST school colors	NU school colors	La Salle school colors	Adamson school colors	UE school colors	UP school colors
La Salle	UP school colors	UE school colors	Adamson school colors	NU school colors	Ateneo school colors	UST school colors	UE school colors	UP school colors	Ateneo school colors	UST school colors	NU school colors	Adamson school colors
NU	UE school colors	Adamson school colors	La Salle school colors	Ateneo school colors	UST school colors	UP school colors	UP school colors	Ateneo school colors	UST school colors	La Salle school colors	Adamson school colors	UE school colors
UE	NU school colors	La Salle school colors	Ateneo school colors	UST school colors	UP school colors	Adamson school colors	La Salle school colors	Adamson school colors	UP school colors	Ateneo school colors	UST school colors	NU school colors
UP	La Salle school colors	Ateneo school colors	UST school colors	UE school colors	Adamson school colors	NU school colors	NU school colors	La Salle school colors	Adamson school colors	UE school colors	Ateneo school colors	UST school colors
UST	Ateneo school colors	UP school colors	UE school colors	Adamson school colors	NU school colors	La Salle school colors	Ateneo school colors	NU school colors	La Salle school colors	Adamson school colors	UE school colors	UP school colors

= Win; = Loss

===== Scores =====
Team	AdU	ADMU	DLSU	NU	UE	UP	UST
Adamson		9–0	9–3	2–1	14–4	5–0	7–2
Ateneo	1–17		1–8	2–9	2–7	3–7	0–7
La Salle	0–10	6–5		2–9	5–4	?	0–7
NU	9–6	7–1	10–4		?	2–3	3–2
UE	3–2	2–3	9–0	7–0		7–0	1–2
UP	1–8	8–1	4–5	5–6	6–4		3–4
UST	1–2	3–0	1–0	3–2	1–5	6–2	

Legend: Blue = left column team win; Red = top row team win.

Results to the right and top of the gray cells are first round games, those to the left and below are second round games. Superscript is the number of innings played before the mercy rule applied.

==== Playoffs ====
Semifinals (Nos. 1 & 2 have twice-to-beat advantage)
Adamson	2
NU	1
UST	6
UE	5

Finals (Best-of-three series)
1	Adamson	3	8	6
2	UST	4	5	0

==== Awards ====
- Season Most Valuable Player: Jeanette Rusia (Adamson Lady Falcons)
- Finals Most Valuable Player: Reflica Basa (Adamson Soaring Falcons)
- Rookie of the Year: Maria Paz Ingrid Laurel (Ateneo Lady Eagles)
- Best Pitcher: Mary Ann Antolihao (UST Growling Tigresses)
- Best Slugger: Imee Salvador (UE Lady Warriors)
- Best Hitter: Nicole Padasas (Adamson Lady Falcons)
- Most Runs Batted-In: Jeaneth Russia (Adamson Lady Falcons)
- Most Stolen Bases: Edna Mae Severino (Adamson Lady Falcons)
- Most Home-runs: Jeaneth Russia (Adamson Lady Falcons)

== Performance Sports ==
=== Cheerdance ===
The UAAP Season 80 cheerdance competition was held on December 2, 2017, at the Mall of Asia Arena. This season marked the comeback of University of the Philippines Pep Squad. Cheerdance competition is an exhibition event. Points for the overall championship are not awarded to the participating schools.

==== Team standings ====
Rank	Team	Order	Tumbling	Stunts	Tosses	Pyramids	Dance	Penalties	Points	Percentage
1st	Adamson Pep Squad	3rd	82.00	80.50	75.00	91.00	337.50	–2	663.50	82.93%
2nd	UST Salinggawi Dance Troupe	7th	83.50	65.00	74.50	83.00	340.50	–8	638.50	79.81%
3rd	UE Pep Squad	5th	82.50	72.00	85.00	88.00	312.00	–5	634.50	79.31%
4th	NU Pep Squad	1st	84.50	76.50	72.00	85.00	303.50	–11	610.50	76.31%
4th	FEU Cheering Squad	4th	80.00	72.50	76.00	80.00	315.00	–13	610.50	69.31%
6th	UP Pep Squad	6th	66.00	56.00	58.00	73.00	329.50	–7	575.50	71.94%
7th	DLSU Animo Squad	2nd	60.50	68.50	57.00	77.00	307.50	–3	567.50	70.94%
8th	Ateneo Blue Babble Battalion	8th	61.00	68.00	46.50	74.00	321.00	–12	558.50	69.81%

Order refers to order of performance.

Special awards from sponsors:

- Yamaha Toss: NU Pep Squad
- Jollibee Inextrahan! Pyramid: Adamson Pep Squad

==== Group stunts competition ====
Ateneo did not compete in this competition.

Champion	2nd place	3rd place
FEU	Adamson	UP

=== Street dance ===
The UAAP Season 80 street dance competition was held on March 11, 2018 at the Mall of Asia Arena. This season marked the comeback of NU Underdawgz after a two-year absence. The juniors' division also competed for the first time. Street dance competition is an exhibition event. Points for the overall championship are not awarded to the participating schools.

==== Juniors division ====
The juniors presented first before the seniors. Ateneo did not participate.

Rank	Team	Order	Performance Judge A	Performance Judge B	Skill Judge C	Skill Judge D	Penalty Judge E	Points
1st place, gold medalist(s)	UST Galvanize	3rd	45.00	37.00	40.00	43.00	–0.20	82.30
2nd place, silver medalist(s)	**Baby Tamaraws Dance Company**	5th	37.00	34.00	38.00	34.00	0	71.50
3rd place, bronze medalist(s)	UE Street Warriors	2nd	37.00	34.00	37.00	35.00	–0.40	71.10
4	Zobel Dance Crew	7th	37.00	31.00	31.00	35.00	0	67.00
5	NU Underdawgz	6th	35.00	30.00	31.00	31.00	–0.20	63.30
6	Adamson Cauldron Dance Company	1st	37.00	31.00	27.00	25.00	0	60.00
7	UP Junior Streetdance Team	4th	33.00	30.00	24.00	25.00	–0.30	55.70

==== Seniors division ====
Rank	Team	Order	Performance Judge A	Performance Judge B	Skill Judge C	Skill Judge D	Penalty Judge E	Points
1st place, gold medalist(s)	**FEU Street Alliance**	5th	46.00	35.00	44.50	46.00	0	85.75
2nd place, silver medalist(s)	La Salle Dance Company – Street	7th	39.00	42.00	39.00	39.00	0	79.50
3rd place, bronze medalist(s)	UP Streetdance Club	4th	45.00	36.00	41.00	36.00	–0.40	78.60
4	UST Prime	3rd	43.00	34.00	36.00	39.00	–0.40	75.60
5	UE Street Warriors	2nd	39.00	40.00	32.00	35.00	–0.80	72.20
6	Company of Ateneo Dancers (CADs)	8th	36.00	33.00	31.00	38.00	0	69.00
7	NU Underdawgz	6th	36.00	33.00	29.00	37.00	0	67.50
8	Adamson CAST	1st	37.00	30.00	23.00	25.00	0	57.50

Host team in boldface

== General championship summary ==
The general champion is determined by a point system. The system gives 15 points to the champion team of a UAAP event, 12 to the runner-up, and 10 to the third placer. The following points: 8, 6, 4, 2 and 1 are given to the rest of the participating teams according to their order of finish.

=== Medals table ===
==== Seniors' division ====
Rank	Team	Gold	Silver	Bronze	Total
1	National University	8	0	0	8
2	University of Santo Tomas	6	7	3	16
3	De La Salle University	5	5	6	16
4	Ateneo de Manila University	4	4	5	13
5	University of the East	3	3	1	7
6	Adamson University	2	0	1	3
7	University of the Philippines Diliman	1	5	7	13
8	Far Eastern University*	1	4	6	11
Totals (8 entries)		30	28	29	87

* Host nation (Season host); General champions
Notes: Results are final.

==== Juniors' division ====
Rank	Team	Gold	Silver	Bronze	Total
1	University of Santo Tomas	2	2	1	5
2	University of the East	2	0	0	2
3	Nazareth School of National University	1	1	2	4
4	Far Eastern University–Diliman*	1	1	0	2
5	Ateneo de Manila University	1	0	0	1
6	De La Salle Zobel	0	2	1	3
7	Adamson University	0	0	0	0
7	UP Integrated School	0	0	0	0
Totals (8 entries)		7	6	4	17

* Host nation (Season host); General champions
Notes: Results are final.

=== General championship tally ===
==== Seniors' division ====
		Basketball		Volleyball (indoor)		Volleyball (beach)		Swimming		Chess		Tennis		Table tennis		Badminton		Taekwondo			Judo		Baseball	Softball	Football		Athletics		Fencing		Total			
Rank	Team	M	W	M	W	M	W	M	W	M	W	M	W	M	W	M	W	M	W	C	M	W	M	W	M	W	M	W	M	W	M	W	C	Overall
1	UST	1	10	8	2	12	15	8	10	8	6	8	15	12	12	8	2	10	8	15	13.5	15	8	12	12	12	6	15	12	6	126.5	140	15	281.5
2	La Salle	12	2	4	15	4	8	12	8	12	15	10	10	6	15	6	15	8	6	12	10	8	12	4	8	15	10	4	10	10	124	135	12	271
3	UP	6	1	2	4	2	10	10	12	2	10	6	8	10	8	12	12	12	10	8	8	10	6	6	15	6	8	10	8	12	107	119	8	234
4	Ateneo	15	4	12	10	8	6	15	15	1	1	12	12	1	1	10	10	4	12	6	13.5	6	10	2	10	8	4	6	6	8	121.5	101	6	228.5
5	NU	4	15	15	8	15	2	6	6	15	4	—	—	15	2	15	8	15	15	4	—	—	4	8	4	—	—	—	—	—	108	68	4	180
6	UE	2	12	1	1	1	4	4	4	4	8	15	—	8	6	4	4	2	4	—	6	12	—	10	6	—	12	8	15	15	80	88	0	168
7	FEU (H)	8	8	10	12	10	12	—	—	10	12	—	—	2	10	—	—	6	2	10	—	—	—	—	2	10	15	12	—	—	63	78	10	151
8	Adamson	10	6	6	6	6	1	2	2	6	2	—	—	4	4	2	6	—	—	—	—	—	15	15	1	—	2	2	—	—	54	44	0	98

(H) Season host; = Champion; = Runner-up; = Third place; — = No team.
Notes: Results are final.

==== Juniors' division ====
		Basketball	Volleyball (indoor)		Swimming	Table tennis		Football	Total		
Rank	Team	B	B	G	B	B	G	B	B	G	Overall
1	UST	10	15	12	15	12	—	8	60	12	72
2	NSNU	12	10	15	—	—	—	10	32	15	47
3	DLSZ	4	6	10	—	—	12	12	22	22	44
4	FEU–D (H)	8	12	8	—	—	—	15	35	8	43
4	UE	1	8	4	—	15	15	—	24	19	43
6	Ateneo	15	2	—	—	—	—	6	23	0	23
7	Adamson	6	4	6	—	—	—	—	10	6	16
8	UPIS	2	1	2	—	—	—	—	3	2	5

(H) Season host; = Champion; = Runner-up; = Third place; — = No team.
Notes: Results are final.

== Closing ceremony ==
The UAAP Season 80 closing ceremony was held at the FEU Auditorium, in the university's main campus in Morayta. The highlight of the 4:30 p.m. event is the announcement of the league's Athletes of the Year. All MVPs from 15 sporting events of the UAAP are eligible to win the Athlete of the Year award. The UAAP has also been giving out special citations to student-athletes who excel in their academics and some who represent the country in local and international competitions.

The closing ceremony also featured the turn-over of the flag of the UAAP to Season 81 host, National University. UAAP Season 80 President of the Board of Trustees Dr. Michael Alba, handed over the UAAP flag to NU's Teodoro Ocampo, the league's season 80 VP of the Board of Trustees, as a symbolic transition of responsibilities of the hosting of UAAP Season 81.

- Athletes of the Year (Juniors)
  - Boy's Category
    - Gio Pabualan (FEU / Football)
  - Girl's Category
    - Nikki Pamintuan (La Salle / Swimming)
- Athletes of the Year (Seniors)
  - Men's Category:
    - Kiko Gesmundo (La Salle / Baseball)
  - Women's Category
    - Kirsten Chloe Daos (Ateneo / Swimming)
- Athlete Scholars (Juniors)
  - Philip Joaquin Santos (Ateneo)
  - Jallen Agra (Adamson)
  - Anna Fatima Royeca (La Salle)
  - John Marvin Miciano (FEU)
  - Faith Nisperos (NU)
  - Samantha Cantantan (UE)
  - Zoe Hilario (UPIS)
  - Ronalyn Lalimo (NU)
- Athlete Scholars (Seniors)
  - Marquis Riley Alindogan (Ateneo)
  - John Wilfred Enal (Adamson)
  - Jamaica Sy (La Salle)
  - Bernadeth Pons (FEU)
  - Mike Minuluan (NU)
  - William Billy Thomas Lara (UP)
  - Noelito Jose (UST)

== Broadcast coverage ==
For the 2nd straight season since its broadcast deal renewal, ABS-CBN Sports provided television and online coverage for all UAAP events. The games were aired live on S+A Channel 23, S+A HD Channel 166 and their website, sports.abs-cbn.com.

Commentators:

- Anton Roxas (Basketball, Volleyball, Football, Softball)
- Boom Gonzalez (Basketball, Volleyball)
- TJ Manotoc (Football, Baseball)
- Eric Tipan (Basketball, Volleyball)
- Jing Jamlang (Basketball, Volleyball, Football)
- Mico Halili (Basketball)
- Nikko Ramos (Basketball)
- Bob Guerrero (Football)

Analysts:

- Bea Daez (Basketball)
- Marco Benitez (Basketball)
- Christian Luanzon (Basketball)
- Ronnie Magsanoc (Basketball, Volleyball, Football, Baseball)
- Adrian Paolo "Doc Ian" Laurel (Volleyball)
- Andre Joseph "AJ" Pareja (Volleyball)
- Martin Antonio (Volleyball)
- Kirk Long (Volleyball)
- Maria Rosario "Charo" Soriano (Volleyball)
- Anne Remulla-Canda (Volleyball)
- Ivy Elayne Remulla (Volleyball)
- TJ Manotoc (Basketball, Football)
- Anton Edward del Rosario (Football)
- Darren Hartman (Football)
- Marielle Benitez (Football)
- Natasha Alquiroz (Football)
- Mikee Carrion (Football)

== See also ==
- NCAA Season 93
