= Kyla Inquig =

Filipino footballer

Personal information
- Full name: Kyla Jan Aragones Inquig
- Date of birth: 24 January 1997 (age 29)
- Place of birth: Dumaguete, Philippines

College career
Years	Team	Apps	(Gls)
–2018	De La Salle University		

International career
2012	Philippines U16		(0)
2017–2018	Philippines	12	(2)

Kyla Jan Aragones Inquig (born 24 January 1997) is a Filipino footballer who has played for the Philippines women's national football team.

== College career ==
Kyla Jan Aragones Inquig, who hails from Dumaguete, plays for the De La Salle University women's team which competes in University Athletic Association of the Philippines (UAAP) Football Championship. According to De La Salle coach Hans Smit, Inquig was self taught in football and only experienced "real training" when she got into the school's team. In 2017, at UAAP Season 79 she helped De La Salle win the women's football title by winning over the University of Santo Tomas (UST).

Inquig led De La Salle again to the final in UAAP Season 80 where her school faced UST again. Inquig scored a brace in the match which ended in a 2–1 victory for De La Salle clinching the second straight title for her school. That match was her last UAAP game for De La Salle since she graduated from the school within the same year.

== International career ==
Inquig played for the Philippine U16 team at the 2013 AFC U-19 Women's Championship qualifiers in November 2012. Inquig received her first call up to senior national team in 2017. She was touted for the 2018 AFC Women's Asian Cup qualifiers but she was forced to beg off citing academic reason. She was later included the Philippine final line in the 2017 Southeast Asian Games. She also played in the 2018 AFF Women's Championship. where she scored a goal in the 3–3 draw against the hosts, Indonesia.

== International goals ==
No.	Date	Venue	Opponent	Score	Result	Competition
1.	9 July 2018	Gelora Sriwijaya Stadium, Palembang, Indonesia	Indonesia	1–0	3–3	2018 AFF Women's Championship
2.	11 November 2018	Hisor Central Stadium, Hisor, Tajikistan	Mongolia	4–1	5–1	2020 AFC Women's Olympic Qualifying Tournament
