= Mathew Custodio =

Filipino footballer (born 1997)

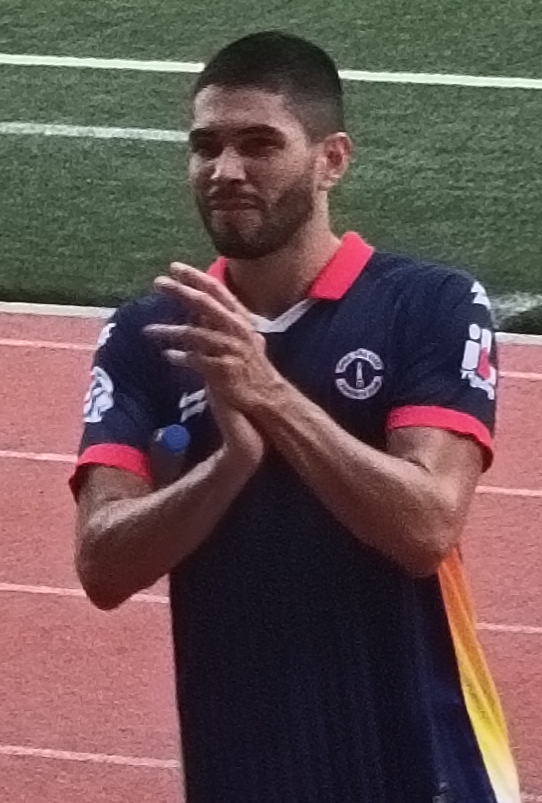
- Custodio in 2025

Personal information
- Full name: Mathew Custodio
- Date of birth: July 29, 1997 (age 29)
- Place of birth: Quezon City, Philippines
- Position: Centre-back

Team information
- Current team: One Taguig
- Number: 5

Youth career
- 2012–2016: La Salle Green Hills

College career
Years	Team	Apps	(Gls)
2017–2018	De La Salle University		(3)

Senior career*
Years	Team	Apps	(Gls)
2014	Manila Nomads		
2019–2020	Global Makati	5	(1)
2020–2022	Azkals Development Team	9	(1)
2022–2023	United City	9	(1)
2024–	One Taguig	8	(0)

International career^{‡}
2015	Philippines U19	7	(2)
- * Club domestic league appearances and goals as of 21:35, June 20, 2024 (UTC) ‡ National team caps and goals as of 21:35, June 20, 2024 (UTC)

Mathew Custodio (born 29 July 1997) is a Filipino professional footballer who plays as a defender for Philippines Football League club One Taguig.

== Personal life ==
Custodio was born in Quezon City in Metro Manila and is of English heritage. He is in a relationship with Miss Universe Philippines 2022 Celeste Cortesi.

== College career ==
Custodio played for the high school football team of La Salle Green Hills, where he played as a forward. In his debut season, he won the NCAA Juniors Championship in 2012 and won twice more in 2015 and 2016.

In 2017 he played for the college team of De La Salle University in the UAAP but struggled to score goals in his first year. He improved in his second year, scoring three goals, but moved to Enderun Colleges in 2019, where he played for the school's futsal team.

== Club career ==
=== Global ===
In the 2014 UFL season Custodio was one of the new recruits of Manila Nomads in the UFL Division 2. In 2019, he made his professional debut with PFL side Global Makati, though he struggled to find goals as the club finished bottom of the league.

=== Azkals Development Team ===
Before the 2020 Philippines Football League, Custodio tried out for the newly-formed Azkals Development Team and was signed by the club, where then-head coach of the Philippines national team Scott Cooper converted him from a forward into a centre-back. He made his debut in a 1–0 loss to United City and stayed with the club for another season.

=== United City ===
Custodio transferred to the PFL defending champions United City in early 2022, where he was an important fixture for the club in the first half of the 2022–23 PFL season. However, his stint was cut short in early 2023 when the club withdrew from the league, citing investor issues.

=== One Taguig ===
In 2024, he made his return to professional football, signing a contract with another newly-formed club, One Taguig FC. He made his debut in the opening match, coming on as a substitute against Manila Montet in a 4–1 win.

== International career ==
=== Philippines U19 ===
Custodio got his first national team call-up while still playing for La Salle Green Hills, representing the country in the 2015 AFF U19 Championship. In the opening game against Brunei, he would score the both goals in a 2–1 win. He would play again in the 2016 CHINA-ASEAN International Youth Football Tournament and the 2016 AFC U19 Championship qualifiers.

=== Philippines ===
For the 2020 edition of the AFF Championship, Custodio was called up for the first time for the Philippine senior team, but is still yet to make his debut for the team.

== Filmography ==
=== Film ===
Year	Title	Role	Note
2019	Mystery of the Night	Taong-bayan	Credited as "Matthew Custodio"
