= UAAP Season 79 =

University athletic year

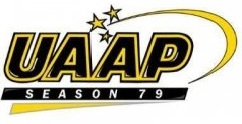
- "Dare to Dream"
- Host school: University of Santo Tomas

Overall
- Seniors: University of Santo Tomas
- Juniors: University of Santo Tomas

Seniors' champions
Sport		Men	Women
Basketball		La Salle	NU
Volleyball		Ateneo	La Salle
Beach volleyball		UST	UST
Football		Ateneo	La Salle
Baseball		Ateneo	N/A
Softball		N/A	Adamson
Fencing		UE	UE
Swimming		Ateneo	UP
Badminton		NU	UP
Chess		NU	FEU
Judo		UST	UST
Table tennis		UST	La Salle
Tennis		UE	NU
Track and field		FEU	UST
Taekwondo		UST	NU
- Poomsae: La Salle (Coed)
- Cheerdance: NU (Ex - Coed)
- Street dance: La Salle (Ex - Coed)
- Ballroom: UP (Ex - Coed)

Juniors' champions
Sport		Boys	Girls
Basketball		FEU	N/A
Volleyball		NU	NU
Football		FEU	N/A
Baseball		La Salle	N/A
Fencing		UE	UE
Swimming		UST	La Salle
Judo		UST	UST
Table tennis		NU	UST
Track and field		UE	UE
Taekwondo		UE	N/A
- (NT) = No tournament; (DS) = Demonstration Sport; (Ex) = Exhibition;

UAAP Season 79 (also known as UAAP LXXIX) is the 2016–2017 athletic year of the University Athletic Association of the Philippines (UAAP). This season, hosted by the University of Santo Tomas officially opened on September 3, 2016. The opening ceremony was held at the UST Plaza Mayor at 3:00 pm with the formal introduction of ballroom dancing as a demonstration sport in this season by the host school University of Santo Tomas (UST) at España, Manila. The official ceremony started at 5:00 pm as there was a concert party themed "Dare to Dream" where the official theme song for the season was revealed. However, unlike in the previous years when the first double-header basketball games were held following the opening ceremonies, this year it was held the following day, September 4 at the Smart Araneta Coliseum.

The eight member universities of the UAAP are competing in fifteen sports to vie for the overall championship. Season 79 marks the start of Ateneo's participation in the Juniors Girls division. Ateneo fielded teams in the Juniors Girls Swimming, Fencing and Track & Field tournaments. For more information check here;

== Opening ceremony ==
The opening ceremony of the UAAP Season 79 was held at the University of Santo Tomas main campus in España, Sampaloc, Manila on September 3, 2016. The ceremony kicked off with a ballroom Formation competition at the Quadricentennial Pavilion.

Ballroom dancing, which all member schools (except FEU) participated, was the newest demonstration sport and a side event before the commencement of UAAP basketball competition. University of the Philippines swept both the Latin and Standard categories in the said competition.

After the event, an opening parade and program proper, followed by an outdoor concert was also held at the nearby Plaza Mayor. The performers include: the UST Salinggawi Dance, Conservatory of Music choirs: Coro Tomasino, and Liturgikon Vocal Ensemble, along with the Conservatory of Music orchestra. Soloist Neil Morales sang the theme "Dare to Dream" composed by Neo Hernandez.

The first doubleheader games of the men's basketball tournament will start the next day at the Smart Araneta Coliseum.

A press conference was conducted at the Novotel Manila in Quezon City, 4 days before the actual opening.

== Rule changes ==
Starting this season, the UAAP officially decided to remove the thrice-to-beat advantage of teams which sweep the elimination rounds in all UAAP sports. In the new rule, a team which will get a perfect record in the elimination rounds will have an outright Finals slot and the championship will be decided via a best-of-3 series, while the other top 3 teams will play using the current stepladder format in the semi-final round with the number 2 seed getting a twice-to-beat advantage. The team which wins the stepladder round gets to play against the sweeping team in a Best of Three Finals. However, in Football, there will be no twice-to-beat advantage for the top 2 seeded teams in the Final Four round and no best-of-three series in the Finals. All match-ups will be a one-game affair.

In addition, the traditional singing of school hymns will be played during the pre-game warm-ups, instead of after the games.

== Sports calendar ==
This is the tentative calendar of events of the UAAP Season 79. The list includes the tournament host schools and the venues.

=== First semester ===
Sport/Division	Event Host	Start Date	Venue/s
Ballroom Dancing (demo sport)	UST	September 3, 2016	UST Quadricentennial Pavilion
Basketball (Men)	UST	September 4, 2016	Smart Araneta Coliseum, Mall of Asia Arena
Basketball (Women)	UST	September 4, 2016	Smart Araneta Coliseum, Mall of Asia Arena
Volleyball (Juniors)	Adamson	September 10, 2016	Adamson University Gym
Badminton (Seniors)	FEU	September 16, 2016	Rizal Memorial Badminton Hall
Beach Volleyball (Seniors)	UE	October 1, 2016	Sands at SM by the Bay
Table Tennis (M/W/B)	UP	October 8–9, 15–19, 2016	Blue Eagle Gym
Taekwondo (M/W/B)	Ateneo	October 22, 2016	Blue Eagle Gym
Poomsae (M/W/B)	Ateneo	October 21, 2016	Blue Eagle Gym / Filoil Flying V Centre
Swimming (Seniors/Juniors)	UP	October 21–24, 2016	Rizal Memorial Swimming Complex
Judo (Seniors/Juniors)	La Salle	November 19, 2016	De La Salle-Zobel Sports Pavilion
Cheerdance	Special Events Committee	November 19, 2016	Smart Araneta Coliseum

=== Second semester ===
Sport/Division	Event Host	Start Date	Venue
Basketball (Boys)	FEU	November 12, 2016	Filoil Flying V Centre
Football (Boys)	Ateneo	December 3, 2016	Rizal Memorial Football Stadium and Moro Lorenzo Football Field
Baseball (M/B)	La Salle	February 4, 2017	Rizal Memorial Baseball Stadium
Softball (W)	La Salle	February 4, 2017	Rizal Memorial Baseball Stadium
Volleyball (Seniors)	UST	February 4, 2017	Filoil Flying V Centre, Smart Araneta Coliseum, Mall of Asia Arena
Football (Seniors)	Ateneo	February 4, 2017	Moro Lorenzo Football Field, Rizal Memorial Football Stadium
Chess (Seniors/Juniors)	Adamson	February 6, 2017	Henry Sy. Sr. Hall, DLSU-Taft
Fencing (Seniors/Juniors)	UE	February 8, 2017	UST Quadricentennial Pavilion Arena
Track and Field (Seniors/Juniors)	NU	February 9, 2017	Philsports Arena (Formerly ULTRA) Oval Track
Lawn Tennis (Seniors)	NU	February 18, 2017	Rizal Memorial Tennis Center
Streetdance	Special Events Committee	May 20, 2017	UST Plaza Mayor

== Basketball ==
=== Seniors' division ===
The UAAP Season 79 seniors division basketball tournament began on September 4, 2016, the day after the official opening. The tournament host is the University of Santo Tomas and the tournament commissioner is Rebo Saguisag. The UAAP have adopted FIBA rules on technicals, timeouts, among others. The tournament still used referees from BRASCU for officiating.

==== Men's tournament ====
===== Elimination round =====
====== Team standings ======
Pos	Team	W	L	PCT	GB	Qualification
1	De La Salle Green Archers	13	1	.929	—	Twice-to-beat in the semifinals
2	Ateneo Blue Eagles	10	4	.714	3	Twice-to-beat in the semifinals
3	FEU Tamaraws	9	5	.643	4	Twice-to-win in the semifinals
4	Adamson Soaring Falcons	8	6	.571	5	Twice-to-win in the semifinals
5	NU Bulldogs	5	9	.357 (Note: Head-to-head record: NU 1–1 UP (NU +6))	8	
6	UP Fighting Maroons	5	9	.357	8	
7	UE Red Warriors	3	11	.214 (Note: Head-to-head record: UE 1–1 UST (UE +9))	10	
8	UST Growling Tigers (H)	3	11	.214	10	

Source: ABS-CBN Sports
Rules for classification: 1) winning percentage; 2) if tied for #2 or #4, one-game playoff; 3) head-to-head record; 4) head-to-head point differential; 5) overall point differential
(H) Hosts

===== Playoffs =====
Semifinals (Top 2 twice-to-beat)
1	La Salle	69
4	Adamson	64
2	Ateneo	61	69*
3	FEU	62	68

Finals (Best-of-three playoff)
1	La Salle	67	79
2	Ateneo	65	72

*Overtime

===== Awards =====
- Most Valuable Player: Ben Mbala (De La Salle Green Archers)
- Rookie of the Year: Aljun Melecio (De La Salle Green Archers)

==== Women's tournament ====
===== Elimination round =====
====== Team standings ======
Pos	Team	W	L	PCT	GB	Qualification
1	NU Lady Bulldogs	14	0	1.000	—	Advance to the Finals (Note: As NU won all of their elimination round games, the stepladder format will be used instead of the regular Final Four format.)
2	De La Salle Lady Archers	11	3	.786	3	Twice-to-beat in stepladder round 2
3	UE Lady Warriors	10	4	.714	4	Proceed to stepladder round 1
4	Adamson Lady Falcons	6	8	.429 (Note: Fourth-seed playoff: Adamson 73–58 UST)	8	Proceed to stepladder round 1
5	UST Growling Tigresses (H)	6	8	.429	8	
6	Ateneo Lady Eagles	4	10	.286	10	
7	FEU Lady Tamaraws	3	11	.214	11	
8	UP Fighting Maroons	2	12	.143	12	

Source: ABS-CBN Sports
Rules for classification: 1) winning percentage; 2) if tied for #2 or #4, one-game playoff; 3) head-to-head record; 4) head-to-head point differential; 5) overall point differential
(H) Hosts

===== Playoffs =====
Stepladder round 1 (Single-elimination)
3	UE	48
4	Adamson	45

Stepladder round 2 (No. 2 twice-to-beat)
2	La Salle	72
3	UE	50

Finals (Best-of-three playoff)
1	NU	77	96
2	La Salle	74	72

===== Awards =====
- Most Valuable Player: Afril Bernardino (NU Lady Bulldogs)
- Rookie of the Year:

=== Juniors' division ===
The UAAP Season 79 Juniors' division basketball tournament started on November 12, 2016. The tournament venue will be at the Filoil Flying V Centre. The tournament host is the Far Eastern University.

==== Boys' tournament ====
===== Elimination round =====
====== Team standings ======
Pos	Team	W	L	PCT	GB	Qualification
1	NUNS Bullpups	12	2	.857	—	Twice-to-beat in the semifinals
2	FEU–D Baby Tamaraws (H)	11	3	.786 (Note: Second-seed playoff: FEU Diliman 64–62 Ateneo)	1	Twice-to-beat in the semifinals
3	Ateneo Blue Eaglets	11	3	.786	1	Twice-to-win in the semifinals
4	Zobel Junior Archers	6	8	.429 (Note: Fourth-seed playoff: DLSZ 72–65 UST)	6	Twice-to-win in the semifinals
5	UST Tiger Cubs	6	8	.429	6	
6	UPIS Junior Fighting Maroons	5	9	.357	7	
7	UE Junior Red Warriors	3	11	.214	9	
8	Adamson Baby Falcons (Note: Adamson forfeited 11 wins after Encho Serrano, who participated on those games, was ruled as an ineligible player.)	2	12	.143	10	

Rules for classification: 1) winning percentage; 2) if tied for #2 or #4, one-game playoff; 3) head-to-head record; 4) head-to-head point differential; 5) overall point differential
(H) Hosts

===== Playoffs =====
Semifinals (Top 2 twice-to-beat)
1	NSNU	72
4	DLSZ	50
2	FEU–D	56	74
3	Ateneo	75	72

Finals (Best-of-three playoff)
1	NSNU	65	73
2	FEU–D	66	81

===== Awards =====
- Most Valuable Player: Juan Gómez de Liaño (UPIS Junior Fighting Maroons)
- Rookie of the Year: Kai Zachary Sotto (Ateneo Blue Eaglets)

== Volleyball ==
=== Seniors' division ===
The UAAP Season 79 seniors division volleyball tournament will start on February 4, 2017. The tournament main venue is the Filoil Flying V Centre in San Juan City while selected games will be played at the Smart Araneta Coliseum in Cubao, Quezon City and the Mall of Asia Arena in Pasay. The tournament host is the University of Santo Tomas. Rustico "Otie" Camangian is the tournament commissioner.

==== Men's tournament ====
===== Elimination round =====
Pos	Team	Pld	W	L	Pts	SW	SL	SR	SPW	SPL	SPR	Qualification
1	Ateneo Blue Eagles	14	14	0	42	42	3	14.000	1126	849	1.326	Advance to the Finals
2	NU Bulldogs	14	12	2	34	37	14	2.643	1206	1063	1.135	Twice-to-beat in stepladder round 2
3	FEU Tamaraws	14	8	6	24	28	22	1.273	1119	1065	1.051	Stepladder round 1
4	UST Growling Tigers (H)	14	6	8	14	22	35	0.629	1179	1292	0.913	Stepladder round 1
5	Adamson Soaring Falcons	14	5	9	18 (Note: Head-to-head record: Adamson 2–2, La Salle 2–2, UP 2–2; Adamson 18 pts, La Salle 17 pts, UP 15 pts)	25	31	0.806	1235	1275	0.969	
6	De La Salle Green Archers	14	5	9	17	23	31	0.742	1195	1217	0.982	
7	UP Fighting Maroons	14	5	9	15	22	32	0.688	1152	1222	0.943	
8	UE Red Warriors	14	1	13	4	10	41	0.244	987	1216	0.812	

Source: ABS-CBN Sports
Rules for classification: 1) number of wins; 2) if tied for #2 or #4, one-game playoff; 3) match points; 4) sets ratio; 5) points ratio; 6) head-to-head record ratio; 6) points ratio
(H) Host

====== Playoffs ======
Stepladder round 1 (One-game playoff)
3	FEU	3
4	UST	0

Stepladder round 2 (No. 2 has twice-to-beat advantage)
2	NU	1	3
3	FEU	3	2

Finals (Best-of-three series)
1	Ateneo	3	3
2	NU	2	2

===== Awards =====
- Most Valuable Player: Marck Jesus Espejo (Ateneo Blue Eagles)
- Rookie of the Year: Chumason Celestine Njigha (Ateneo Blue Eagles)

==== Women's tournament ====
===== Elimination round =====
Pos	Team	Pld	W	L	Pts	SW	SL	SR	SPW	SPL	SPR	Qualification
1	Ateneo Lady Eagles	14	12	2	35	39	12	3.250	1189	978	1.216	Twice-to-beat in the semifinals
2	De La Salle Lady Archers	14	11	3	33	35	11	3.182	1103	893	1.235	Twice-to-beat in the semifinals
3	UST Growling Tigresses (H)	14	9	5	26	29	21	1.381	1154	1044	1.105	Twice-to-win in the semifinals
4	FEU Lady Tamaraws	14	8	6	26	30	21	1.429	1167	1061	1.100	Twice-to-win in the semifinals
5	UP Lady Maroons	14	7	7	22 (Note: Head-to-head record: UP 1–1 NU; UP +2)	24	24	1.000	1050	1034	1.015	
6	NU Lady Bulldogs	14	7	7	20	27	28	0.964	1166	1211	0.963	
7	UE Lady Warriors	14	1	13	3 (Note: Head-to-head record: UE 1–1 Adamson; UE: better sets ratio)	7	40	0.175	862	1143	0.754	
8	Adamson Lady Falcons	14	1	13	3	5	39	0.128	739	1066	0.693	

Source: ABS-CBN Sports
Rules for classification: 1) number of wins; 2) if tied for #2 or #4, one-game playoff; 3) match points; 4) sets ratio; 5) points ratio; 6) head-to-head record
(H) Host

====== Playoffs ======
Semifinals (Nos. 1 & 2 have twice-to-beat advantage)
1	Ateneo	3
4	FEU	1
2	La Salle	3
3	UST	1

Finals (Best-of-three series)
1	Ateneo	1	2
2	La Salle	3	3

===== Awards =====
- Most Valuable Player: Mary Joy Baron (De La Salle Lady Archers)
- Finals MVP : Desiree Wynea Cheng (De La Salle Lady Archers)
- Rookie of the Year: Julianne Marie Samonte (Ateneo Lady Eagles)

=== Juniors' division ===
The UAAP Season 79 juniors' volleyball tournament started on September 10, 2016. The tournament venue will be at the Adamson University Gym. Adamson is the tournament host. The number of participating schools in the boys' and girls' tournaments increased to eight and seven, respectively. Far Eastern University fielded boys' and girls' volleyball teams beginning season 77. Adamson fielded a boys' team starting season 79. Since there are now more than six participating schools in each tournament, both tournaments will have a Final Four format. The UAAP Board decided to move the high school volleyball tournaments from 2nd semester to 1st semester in Season 78 due to the basketball juniors tournament being moved from the 1st semester to 2nd semester.

==== Boys' tournament ====
===== Elimination round =====
Pos	Team	Pld	W	L	PCT	GB	Qualification
1	NUNS Bullpups	14	13	1	.929	—	Twice-to-beat in the semifinals
2	UST Tiger Cubs (H)	14	12	2	.857	1	Twice-to-beat in the semifinals
3	UE Junior Red Warriors	14	10	4	.714	3	Twice-to-win in the semifinals
4	FEU–D Baby Tamaraws	14	8	6	.571	5	Twice-to-win in the semifinals
5	Ateneo Blue Eaglets	14	6	8	.429	7	
6	Zobel Junior Archers	14	4	10	.286	9	
7	Adamson Baby Falcons	14	2	12	.143	11	
8	UPIS Junior Fighting Maroons	14	0	14	.000	13	

Source: ABS-CBN Sports
Rules for classification: 1) winning percentage; 2) if tied for #2 or #4, one-game playoff; 3) head-to-head record; 4) head-to-head point differential; 5) overall point differential
(H) Hosts

====== Playoffs ======
Semifinals (Nos. 1 & 2 have twice-to-beat advantage)
NU	3
FEU	1
UST	3
UE	0

Finals (Best-of-three series)
1	NU	3	2	3
2	UST	2	3	0

===== Awards =====
- Most Valuable Player: Lorence Cruz (NUNS Bullpups)
- Rookie of the Year: Raymond Bryce De Guzman (Zobel Junior Archers)

==== Girls' tournament ====
===== Elimination round =====
Pos	Team	Pld	W	L	PCT	GB	Qualification
1	NSNU Lady Bullpups	12	12	0	1.000	—	Advance to the Finals
2	UST Junior Tigresses (H)	12	10	2	.833	2	Twice-to-beat in stepladder round 2
3	DLSZ Junior Lady Archers	12	8	4	.667	4	Qualified to stepladder round 1
4	UE Junior Amazons	12	4	8	.333	8	Qualified to stepladder round 1
5	FEU Lady Baby Tamaraws	12	4	8	.333	8	
6	Adamson Lady Baby Falcons	12	4	8	.333	8	
7	UPIS Junior Lady Maroons	12	0	12	.000	12	

Source: ABS-CBN Sports
Rules for classification: 1) winning percentage; 2) if tied for #2 or #4, one-game playoff; 3) head-to-head record; 4) head-to-head point differential; 5) overall point differential
(H) Hosts

===== Playoffs =====
4th–seed playoff (One–game playoff)
4	FEU	0
5	UE	3

First round (One–game playoff)
3	DLSZ	3
4	UE	0

Semifinals (No. 2 seed has twice-to-beat advantage)
2	UST	3
3	DLSZ	1

Finals (Best-of-three series)
1	NSNU	3	1	3
2	UST	0	3	1

===== Awards =====
- Most Valuable Player: Faith Janine Shirley Nisperos (NUNS Lady Bullpups)
- Rookie of the Year: Kathleen Keith Layugan (UE Junior Lady Warriors)

== Beach volleyball ==
The UAAP Season 79 beach volleyball tournament began on October 1, 2016. The tournament venue was at the Sands at SM by the Bay, SM Mall of Asia in Pasay, Metro Manila. University of the East was the tournament host. Beach volleyball is a single round-robin elimination tournament.

=== Men's tournament ===
==== Elimination round ====
Team standings

Pos	Team	Pld	W	L	PCT	GB	Qualification
1	UST Growling Tigers	7	7	0	1.000	—	Advance to the Finals
2	UP Fighting Maroons	7	5	2	.714	2	Twice-to-beat in stepladder round 2
3	NU Bulldogs	7	4	3	.571 (Note: Head-to-head record: NU 2–0, FEU 1–1, Adamson 0–2)	3	Qualified to stepladder round 1
4	FEU Tamaraws	7	4	3	.571	3	Qualified to stepladder round 1
5	Adamson Soaring Falcons	7	4	3	.571	3	Qualified to fourth-seed playoff
6	Ateneo Blue Eagles	7	3	4	.429	4	
7	De La Salle Green Archers	7	1	6	.143	6	
8	UE Red Warriors (H)	7	0	7	.000	7	

Source: ABS-CBN Sports
Rules for classification: 1) winning percentage; 2) if tied for #2 or #4, one-game playoff; 3) head-to-head record; 4) head-to-head point differential; 5) overall point differential
(H) Hosts
Notes:

Match-up results

Team ╲ Game	1	2	3	4	5	6	7
AdMU	UST school colors	NU school colors	FEU school colors	Adamson school colors	UE school colors	UP school colors	La Salle school colors
AdU	UP school colors	FEU school colors	NU school colors	Ateneo school colors	La Salle school colors	UST school colors	UE school colors
DLSU	FEU school colors	UP school colors	UST school colors	NU school colors	Adamson school colors	UE school colors	Ateneo school colors
FEU	La Salle school colors	Adamson school colors	Ateneo school colors	UE school colors	UP school colors	NU school colors	UST school colors
NU	UE school colors	Ateneo school colors	Adamson school colors	La Salle school colors	UST school colors	FEU school colors	UP school colors
UE	NU school colors	UST school colors	UP school colors	FEU school colors	Ateneo school colors	La Salle school colors	Adamson school colors
UP	Adamson school colors	La Salle school colors	UE school colors	UST school colors	FEU school colors	Ateneo school colors	NU school colors
UST	Ateneo school colors	UE school colors	La Salle school colors	UP school colors	NU school colors	Adamson school colors	FEU school colors

= Win; = Loss

===== Playoffs =====
Stepladder round 1 (One-game playoff)
3	NU	0
4	FEU	2

Stepladder round 2 (No. 2 has twice-to-beat advantage)
2	UP	0	0
4	FEU	2	2

Finals (Best-of-three series)
1	UST	2	2
4	FEU	0	0

==== Awards ====
- Most Valuable Player: Kris Roy Guzman (UST Growling Tigers)
- Rookie of the Year: Jeremiah Barrica (FEU Tamaraws)

=== Women's tournament ===
==== Elimination round ====
Team standings

Pos	Team	Pld	W	L	PCT	GB	Qualification
1	UST Growling Tigresses	7	7	0	1.000	—	Advance to the Finals
2	FEU Lady Tamaraws	7	5	2	.714	2	Twice-to-beat in stepladder round 2
3	Ateneo Lady Eagles	7	4	3	.571	3	Qualified to stepladder round 1
4	De La Salle Lady Archers	7	4	3	.571	3	Qualified to stepladder round 1
5	UP Lady Maroons	7	3	4	.429	4	
6	NU Lady Bulldogs	7	3	4	.429	4	
7	Adamson Lady Falcons (H)	7	1	6	.143	6	
8	UE Lady Warriors	7	1	6	.143	6	

Source: ABS-CBN Sports
Rules for classification: 1) winning percentage; 2) if tied for #2 or #4, one-game playoff; 3) head-to-head record; 4) head-to-head point differential; 5) overall point differential
(H) Hosts

Match-up results

Team ╲ Game	1	2	3	4	5	6	7
AdMU	UST school colors	NU school colors	FEU school colors	Adamson school colors	UE school colors	UP school colors	La Salle school colors
AdU	UP school colors	FEU school colors	NU school colors	Ateneo school colors	La Salle school colors	UST school colors	UE school colors
DLSU	FEU school colors	UP school colors	UST school colors	NU school colors	Adamson school colors	UE school colors	Ateneo school colors
FEU	La Salle school colors	Adamson school colors	Ateneo school colors	UE school colors	UP school colors	NU school colors	UST school colors
NU	UE school colors	Ateneo school colors	Adamson school colors	La Salle school colors	UST school colors	FEU school colors	UP school colors
UE	NU school colors	UST school colors	UP school colors	FEU school colors	Ateneo school colors	La Salle school colors	Adamson school colors
UP	Adamson school colors	La Salle school colors	UE school colors	UST school colors	FEU school colors	Ateneo school colors	NU school colors
UST	Ateneo school colors	UE school colors	La Salle school colors	UP school colors	NU school colors	Adamson school colors	FEU school colors

= Win; = Loss

===== Playoffs =====
Stepladder round 1 (One-game playoff)
3	Ateneo	0
4	La Salle	2

Stepladder round 2 (No. 2 has twice-to-beat advantage)
2	FEU	1	2
4	La Salle	2	0

Finals (Best-of-three series)
1	UST	2	1	2
2	FEU	0	2	0

==== Awards ====
- Most Valuable Player: Sisi Rondina (UST Growling Tigresses)
- Rookie of the Year: Caitlyn Viray (UST Growling Tigers)

== Football ==
The UAAP Season 79 seniors division football tournament will start on February 4, 2017, at the Rizal Memorial Football Stadium. The tournament venue will be at the following football fields: Rizal Memorial Stadium (during weekends) and the Ateneo Moro Lorenzo Field (during weekdays). The tournament host is Ateneo and Rely San Agustin is the tournament commissioner.

=== Men's tournament ===
==== Elimination round ====
===== Team standings =====
Pos	Team	Pld	W	D	L	GF	GA	GD	Pts	Qualification
1	Ateneo Blue Eagles	14	11	2	1	33	7	+26	35	Semifinals
2	UP Fighting Maroons	14	8	4	2	21	8	+13	28	Semifinals
3	FEU Tamaraws	14	6	4	4	20	12	+8	22	Semifinals
4	UST Growling Tigers (H)	14	6	3	5	18	16	+2	21	Semifinals
5	NU Bulldogs	14	6	1	7	17	19	−2	19	
6	De La Salle Green Archers	14	4	4	6	12	13	−1	16	
7	UE Red Warriors	14	4	2	8	13	25	−12	14	
8	Adamson Soaring Falcons	14	1	0	13	8	40	−32	3	

Source: ABS-CBN Sports
(H) Hosts

===== Playoffs =====
Semifinals
1	**Ateneo**	**2**
4	UST	1
2	UP	1
3	**FEU**	**2**

Finals
1	**Ateneo**	**1**
3	FEU	0

Bold = winner
* = after extra time, ( ) = penalty shootout score

===== Awards =====
- Most Valuable Player: Javier Augustine Gayoso (Ateneo Blue Eagles)
- Rookie of the Year: Jordan Blair Jarvis (Ateneo Blue Eagles)

==== Women's tournament ====
===== Elimination round =====
Pos	Team	Pld	W	D	L	GF	GA	GD	Pts	Qualification
1	De La Salle Lady Archers	8	8	0	0	27	5	+22	**24**	Finals
2	UST Growling Tigresses (H)	8	4	1	3	16	18	−2	**13**	Finals
3	Ateneo Lady Eagles	8	2	2	4	14	22	−8	**8**	One-game playoff
4	UP Fighting Maroons	8	1	3	4	7	14	−7	**6**	
5	FEU Lady Tamaraws	8	1	2	5	11	16	−5	**5**	

Source: ABS-CBN Sports
(H) Hosts

==== Playoffs ====
One-game playoff			Finals; One-game playoff
			1	**La Salle**	**3**
2	**UST**	**5**	2	UST	1
3	Ateneo	4

===== Awards =====
- Most Valuable Player: Kyla Inquig (De La Salle Lady Archers)
- Rookie of the Year: Mary Indac (UST Growling Tigresses)

==== Boys' tournament ====
The UAAP Season 79 juniors' division football tournament started on December 3, 2016. All games are scheduled to take place at the Ateneo Moro Lorenzo Football field on December 3, 10, 17 for the first round and January 14, 21, 28, 2017 for the second round. The championship game is scheduled for February 4, 2017. Ateneo is the tournament host.

===== Elimination round =====
Pos	Team	Pld	W	D	L	GF	GA	GD	Pts	Qualification
1	FEU–D Baby Tamaraws	6	5	0	1	24	6	+18	**15**	Finals
2	Zobel Junior Archers	6	5	0	1	18	7	+11	**15**	Finals
3	Ateneo Blue Eaglets (H)	6	0	2	4	4	17	−13	**2**	
4	UST Tiger Cubs	6	0	2	4	7	23	−16	**2**	

Source: ABS-CBN Sports
(H) Hosts

===== Finals =====
Finals
1	**FEU**	**1**
2	La Salle	0

===== Awards =====
- Most Valuable Player: Orlan Togores (FEU–D Baby Tamaraws)
- Rookie of the Year: Jermi Darapan (FEU–D Baby Tamaraws)

== Baseball ==
The UAAP Season 79 Seniors' division baseball tournament began on February 4, 2017, at the Rizal Memorial Baseball Stadium in Malate Manila. The tournament host is La Salle.

=== Men's tournament ===
==== Elimination round ====
Team standings

Pos	Team	Pld	W	L	PCT	GB	Qualification
1	UST Growling Tigers	9	7	2	.778	—	Qualified to the Finals
2	Ateneo Blue Eagles	10	7	3	.700	0.5	Qualified to the Finals
3	Adamson Soaring Falcons	9	5	4	.556	2	
4	De La Salle Green Archers	10	5	5	.500	2.5	
5	NU Bulldogs	10	4	6	.400	3.5	
6	UP Fighting Maroons	10	0	10	.000	7.5	

Rules for classification: 1) winning percentage; 2) if tied for #2 or #4, one-game playoff; 3) head-to-head record; 4) head-to-head point differential; 5) overall point differential

Match-up results

	Round 1					Round 2				
Team ╲ Game	1	2	3	4	5	6	7	8	9	10
AdU	NU school colors	UP school colors	La Salle school colors	Ateneo school colors	UST school colors	La Salle school colors	UP school colors	Ateneo school colors	NU school colors	
AdMU	UST school colors	NU school colors	UP school colors	Adamson school colors	La Salle school colors	UP school colors	NU school colors	Adamson school colors	La Salle school colors	UST school colors
DLSU	UP school colors	UST school colors	Adamson school colors	NU school colors	Ateneo school colors	Adamson school colors	UST school colors	NU school colors	Ateneo school colors	UP school colors
NU	Adamson school colors	Ateneo school colors	UST school colors	La Salle school colors	UP school colors	UST school colors	Ateneo school colors	La Salle school colors	Adamson school colors	UP school colors
UP	La Salle school colors	Adamson school colors	Ateneo school colors	UST school colors	NU school colors	Ateneo school colors	Adamson school colors	UST school colors	NU school colors	La Salle school colors
UST	Ateneo school colors	La Salle school colors	NU school colors	UP school colors	Adamson school colors	NU school colors	La Salle school colors	UP school colors		Ateneo school colors

= Win; = Loss

Scores
Results to the right and top of the gray cells are first round games, those to the left and below are second round games. Superscript is the number of innings played before the mercy rule applied.

Team	AdU	ADMU	DLSU	NU	UP	UST
Adamson		4–2	6–3	5–7	9–5	4–20
Ateneo	6–4		13–6	10–1	8–5	12–2
La Salle		8–5			19–1	11–4
NU	3–4				3–2	6–11
UP		0–4	5–9			10–18
UST		9–4	11–6		8–2	

Legend: Blue = left column team win; Red = top row team win.

==== Finals ====
Team 1	Score	Team 2
Adamson Soaring Falcons	14–4	De La Salle Green Archers
Adamson Soaring Falcons	–	De La Salle Green Archers
Adamson Soaring Falcons	-	De La Salle Green Archers

==== Awards ====
- Season Most Valuable Player: Ignacio Luis Escaño (De La Salle Green Archers)
- Finals Most Valuable Player: Juan Paulo Macasaet (Ateneo Blue Eagles)
- Rookie of the Year: Daniel Jaime Laurel (Ateneo Blue Eagles)
- Best Pitcher: Jerome Yenson (Adamson Soaring Falcons)
- Best Hitter: Ignacio Luis Escaño (De La Salle Green Archers)
- Best Slugger: Ignacio Luis Escaño (De La Salle Green Archers)
- Most Runs Batted-In : Ignacio Luis Escaño (De La Salle Green Archers)
- Most Home-runs : Ignacio Luis Escaño (De La Salle Green Archers) and Jerome Yenson (Adamson Soaring Falcons)
- Most Stolen Bases : Paolo Gonzalo Salud (De La Salle Green Archers)

=== Boys' tournament ===
The UAAP Season 79 Juniors' division baseball (demonstration sport) tournament began on February 4, 2017, at the Rizal Memorial Baseball Stadium in Malate Manila. The tournament host is La Salle.

==== Elimination round ====
Team standings

Pos	Team	Pld	W	L	PCT	GB
1	Ateneo Blue Eaglets	3	2	1	.667	—
2	UST Tiger Cubs	2	1	1	.500	0.5
3	Zobel Junior Archers	1	0	1	.000	1

Rules for classification: 1) winning percentage; 2) if tied for #2 or #4, one-game playoff; 3) head-to-head record; 4) head-to-head point differential; 5) overall point differential

Match-up results

	Round 1		Round 2	
Team ╲ Game	1	2	3	4
AdMU	UST school colors	La Salle school colors	UST school colors	La Salle school colors
DLSZ	UST school colors	Ateneo school colors	UST school colors	Ateneo school colors
UST	Ateneo school colors	La Salle school colors	Ateneo school colors	La Salle school colors

= Win; = Loss

==== Scores ====
Results to the right and top of the gray cells are first round games, those to the left and below are second round games. Superscript is the number of innings played before the mercy rule applied.

Team	AdMU	DLSZ	UST
Ateneo			7–8
La Salle	0–3		
UST	2–3		

Legend: Blue = left column team win; Red = top row team win.

==== Finals ====
Team 1	Score	Team 2
Ateneo Blue Eaglets	3–1	Zobel Junior Archers
Ateneo Blue Eaglets	7–8	Zobel Junior Archers
Ateneo Blue Eaglets	0-2	Zobel Junior Archers

==== Awards ====
- Most Valuable Player:
- Rookie of the Year:

== Softball ==
The UAAP Season 79 softball tournament began on February 4, 2017, at the Rizal Memorial Baseball Stadium in Malate Manila. The tournament host is La Salle. Softball is a sport for women only in the UAAP.

=== Women's tournament ===
==== Elimination round ====
===== Team standings =====
Pos	Team	Pld	W	L	PCT	GB
1	Adamson Lady Falcons	9	8	1	.889	—
2	NU Lady Bulldogs	8	7	1	.875	0.5
3	UST Growling Tigresses	9	5	4	.556	3
4	De La Salle Lady Archers	9	4	5	.444	4
5	UE Lady Warriors	10	4	6	.400	4.5
6	UP Fighting Maroons	10	4	6	.400	4.5
7	Ateneo Lady Eagles	11	1	10	.091	8

Rules for classification: 1) winning percentage; 2) if tied for #2 or #4, one-game playoff; 3) head-to-head record; 4) head-to-head point differential; 5) overall point differential

===== Match-up results =====
	Round 1						Round 2					
Team ╲ Game	1	2	3	4	5	6	7	8	9	10	11	12
AdU	NU school colors	UE school colors	Ateneo school colors	UST school colors	UP school colors	La Salle school colors				Ateneo school colors		
AdMU	UST school colors	UP school colors	La Salle school colors	Adamson school colors	NU school colors	UE school colors	NU school colors	La Salle school colors	UE school colors	Adamson school colors	UP school colors	
DLSU	NU school colors	UE school colors	Ateneo school colors	UST school colors	UP school colors	Adamson school colors	UP school colors	Ateneo school colors				
NU	La Salle school colors	Adamson school colors	UE school colors	Ateneo school colors	UST school colors	UP school colors				UE school colors		
UE	UP school colors	La Salle school colors	Adamson school colors	NU school colors	Ateneo school colors	UST school colors			Ateneo school colors	NU school colors		
UP	UE school colors	Ateneo school colors	UST school colors	La Salle school colors	Adamson school colors	NU school colors	La Salle school colors		UST school colors		Ateneo school colors	
UST	Ateneo school colors	UP school colors	La Salle school colors	Adamson school colors	NU school colors	UE school colors			UP school colors			

= Win; = Loss

===== Scores =====
Results to the right and top of the gray cells are first round games, those to the left and below are second round games. Superscript is the number of innings played before the mercy rule applied.

Team	AdU	ADMU	DLSU	NU	UE	UP	UST
Adamson		11–1	9–1	6–5	10–3	14–0	4–0
Ateneo	2–11		1–11	0–6	6–5	5–6	3–5
La Salle		2–1		2–7	4–5	6–1	1–3
NU		9–2					1–0
UE				1–2		0–11	
UP		5–4	1–9				2–5
UST					8–1	2–5	

Legend: Blue = left column team win; Red = top row team win.

==== Awards ====
- Season Most Valuable Player: Angelie Ursabia (Adamson Lady Falcons)
- Finals Most Valuable Player: Lyca Basa (Adamson Lady Falcons)
- Rookie of the Year: Jamie Luz San Juan (Ateneo Lady Eagles)
- Best Pitcher: Mary Ann Antolihao (UST Growling Tigresses)
- Best Hitter: Mallows Garde (UST Growling Tigresses)
- Best Slugger: Angelie Ursabia (Adamson Lady Falcons)
- Most Runs Batted-In : Florabelle Pabiana (Adamson Lady Falcons)
- Most Stolen Bases : Krisha Cantor (Adamson Lady Falcons)
- Most Home-runs : Angelie Ursabia (Adamson Lady Falcons)

== Badminton ==
The UAAP Season 79 badminton tournament began on September 16, 2016. The tournament venue was the Rizal Memorial Badminton Hall in Vito Cruz St., Malate, Manila. Badminton is a single round-robin elimination tournament. Far Eastern University was the tournament host.

=== Seniors' division ===
==== Men's tournament ====
===== Elimination round =====
Team standings

Pos	Team	Pld	W	L	PCT	GB	Qualification
1	NU Bulldogs	7	7	0	1.000	—	Advance to the Finals
2	UP Fighting Maroons	7	6	1	.857	1	Twice-to-beat in stepladder round 2
3	De La Salle Green Archers	7	4	3	.571	3	Qualified to stepladder round 1
4	Ateneo Blue Eagles	7	4	3	.571 (Note: Fourth-seed playoff: Ateneo 3–1 UST)	3	Qualified to stepladder round 1
5	UST Growling Tigers	7	4	3	.571	3	Qualified to fourth-seed playoff
6	FEU Tamaraws (H)	7	2	5	.286	5	
7	UE Red Warriors	7	1	6	.143	6	
8	Adamson Soaring Falcons	7	0	7	.000	7	

Source: ABS-CBN Sports
Rules for classification: 1) winning percentage; 2) if tied for #2 or #4, one-game playoff; 3) head-to-head record; 4) head-to-head point differential; 5) overall point differential
(H) Hosts
Notes:

Match-up results

Team ╲ Game	1	2	3	4	5	6	7
ADMU	UP school colors	FEU school colors	UE school colors	NU school colors	La Salle school colors	Adamson school colors	UST school colors
AdU	NU school colors	UE school colors	FEU school colors	UP school colors	UST school colors	Ateneo school colors	La Salle school colors
DLSU	FEU school colors	UP school colors	NU school colors	UST school colors	Ateneo school colors	UE school colors	Adamson school colors
FEU	La Salle school colors	Ateneo school colors	Adamson school colors	UE school colors	UP school colors	UST school colors	NU school colors
NU	Adamson school colors	UST school colors	La Salle school colors	Ateneo school colors	UE school colors	UP school colors	FEU school colors
UE	UST school colors	Adamson school colors	Ateneo school colors	FEU school colors	NU school colors	La Salle school colors	UP school colors
UP	Ateneo school colors	La Salle school colors	UST school colors	Adamson school colors	FEU school colors	NU school colors	UE school colors
UST	UE school colors	NU school colors	UP school colors	La Salle school colors	Adamson school colors	FEU school colors	Ateneo school colors

= Win; = Loss

===== Playoffs =====
4th–seed playoff (One–game playoff)
4	UST	1
5	Ateneo	3

First round (One–game playoff)
3	La Salle	2
4	Ateneo	3

Semifinals (No. 2 seed has twice-to-beat advantage)
2	UP	1	2
4	Ateneo	3	3

Finals (Best-of-three series)
1	NU	3	3
4	Ateneo	0	0

===== Awards =====
- Most Valuable Player: Ros Leenard Pedrosa (NU Bulldogs)
- Rookie of the Year: Enrico Keoni Asuncion (Ateneo Blue Eagles)

==== Women's tournament ====
===== Elimination round =====
Team standings

Pos	Team	Pld	W	L	PCT	GB	Qualification
1	UP Fighting Maroons	7	7	0	1.000	—	Advance to the Finals
2	De La Salle Lady Archers	7	6	1	.857	1	Twice-to-beat in stepladder round 2
3	Ateneo Lady Eagles	7	5	2	.714	2	Qualified to stepladder round 1
4	NU Lady Bulldogs	7	4	3	.571	3	Qualified to stepladder round 1
5	UST Growling Tigresses	7	3	4	.429	4	
6	FEU Lady Tamaraws (H)	7	2	5	.286	5	
7	Adamson Lady Falcons	7	1	6	.143	6	
8	UE Lady Warriors	7	0	7	.000	7	

Source: ABS-CBN Sports
Rules for classification: 1) winning percentage; 2) if tied for #2 or #4, one-game playoff; 3) head-to-head record; 4) head-to-head point differential; 5) overall point differential
(H) Hosts

Match-up results

Team ╲ Game	1	2	3	4	5	6	7
ADMU	UP school colors	FEU school colors	UE school colors	NU school colors	La Salle school colors	Adamson school colors	UST school colors
AdU	NU school colors	UE school colors	FEU school colors	UP school colors	UST school colors	Ateneo school colors	La Salle school colors
DLSU	FEU school colors	UP school colors	NU school colors	UST school colors	Ateneo school colors	UE school colors	Adamson school colors
FEU	La Salle school colors	Ateneo school colors	Adamson school colors	UE school colors	UP school colors	UST school colors	NU school colors
NU	Adamson school colors	UST school colors	La Salle school colors	Ateneo school colors	UE school colors	UP school colors	FEU school colors
UE	UST school colors	Adamson school colors	Ateneo school colors	FEU school colors	NU school colors	La Salle school colors	UP school colors
UP	Ateneo school colors	La Salle school colors	UST school colors	Adamson school colors	FEU school colors	NU school colors	UE school colors
UST	UE school colors	NU school colors	UP school colors	La Salle school colors	Adamson school colors	FEU school colors	Ateneo school colors

= Win; = Loss

===== Playoffs =====
Stepladder round 1 (One-game playoff)
3	Ateneo	3
4	NU	0

Stepladder round 2 (No. 2 has twice-to-beat advantage)
2	La Salle	0	0
3	Ateneo	3	3

Finals (Best-of-three series)
1	UP	2	3	3
3	Ateneo	3	2	1

===== Awards =====
- Most Valuable Player: Malvinne Ann Venice Alcala (UP Lady Maroons)
- Rookie of the Year: Chanelle Lunod (Ateneo Lady Eagles)

== Judo ==
The UAAP Season 79 Judo Championships was held from November 19–20, 2016 at the De La Salle Zobel Sports Pavilion in Ayala Alabang, Muntinlupa. The tournament host was De La Salle University.

=== Seniors' division ===
==== Men's tournament ====
===== Medal tally =====
Rank	Team	Medals				Points
Rank	Team	1st place, gold medalist(s)	2nd place, silver medalist(s)	3rd place, bronze medalist(s)	**Total**	Points
Champions	UST	4	1	2	7	**49**
Runners-up	Ateneo	1	4	3	8	**36**
Third-placers	**La Salle**	2	1	2	5	**29**
4	UP	1	1	7	9	**29**
5	UE					**9**
6	Adamson					**0**

Event host in **boldface**

===== Awards =====
- Most Valuable Player: Daryl John Mercado (UST Growling Tigers)
- Rookie of the Year: Yiu Man Noah Lee (UP Fighting Maroons)

==== Women's tournament ====
===== Medal tally =====
Rank	Team	Medals				Points
Rank	Team	1st place, gold medalist(s)	2nd place, silver medalist(s)	3rd place, bronze medalist(s)	**Total**	Points
1st place, gold medalist(s)	UST	4	6	2	12	**74**
2nd place, silver medalist(s)	UE	1				**23**
3rd place, bronze medalist(s)	UP	1				**20**
4	**La Salle**	1				**19**
5	Ateneo	1	0	2	3	**14**

Event host in **boldface**

===== Awards =====
- Most Valuable Player: Sueko Kenji (UST Growling Tigresses)
- Rookie of the Year: Blanca Louise Garcia (Ateneo Lady Eagles)

Medal	Pts.
1st	10
2nd	5
3rd	2

=== Juniors' division ===
==== Boys' tournament ====
===== Medal tally =====
Rank	Team	Medals				Points
Rank	Team	1st place, gold medalist(s)	2nd place, silver medalist(s)	3rd place, bronze medalist(s)	**Total**	Points
1st place, gold medalist(s)	UST					**43**
2nd place, silver medalist(s)	**La Salle**					**39**
3rd place, bronze medalist(s)	Ateneo					
4	FEU					
5	UE					
6	UP					

Event host in **boldface**

===== Awards =====
- Most Valuable Player: Aaron Emmanuel Reyes (UST Tiger Cubs)
- Rookie of the Year:

==== Girls' tournament ====
This is a demonstration event.

===== Medal tally =====
Rank	Team	Medals				Points
Rank	Team	1st place, gold medalist(s)	2nd place, silver medalist(s)	3rd place, bronze medalist(s)	**Total**	Points
1st place, gold medalist(s)	UST					**68**
2nd place, silver medalist(s)	FEU					
3rd place, bronze medalist(s)	**La Salle**					
4	UE					

Event host in **boldface**

===== Awards =====
- Most Valuable Player: Krizza Joy Amazola (UST Junior Tigresses)
- Rookie of the Year:

== Swimming ==
The UAAP Season 79 Swimming Championships was held from October 21–24, 2016 at the Rizal Memorial Swimming Pool in Vito Cruz St., Malate, Manila. The tournament host was University of the Philippines and tournament commissioner was Richard G. Luna. The number of participating teams in the Girls' tournament increased by one school with the participation of Ateneo.

Team ranking is determined by a point system, similar to that of the overall championship. The points given are based on the swimmer's/team's finish in the finals of an event, which include only the top eight finishers from the preliminaries. The gold medalist(s) receive 15 points, silver gets 12, bronze has 10. The following points: 8, 6, 4, 2 and 1 are given to the rest of the participating swimmers/teams according to their order of finish.

=== Seniors' division ===
==== Men's tournament ====
**Team standings (Final)**

Rank	Team	Medals				Rec	Points
Rank	Team	1st place, gold medalist(s)	2nd place, silver medalist(s)	3rd place, bronze medalist(s)	**Total**	Rec	Points
1st place, gold medalist(s)	Ateneo	8	6	3	17	3	603
2nd place, silver medalist(s)	La Salle						314
3rd place, bronze medalist(s)	**UP**	1			1	1	194
4	UST		2		2		84
5	NU						28
6	Adamson						26
7	UE						6

**Rec** - Number of new swimming records established
Event host in **boldface**

===== Awards =====
- Most Valuable Player: Alberto Batungbacal (Ateneo Blue Eagles)
- Rookie of the Year: Miguel Antonio Arellano (Ateneo Blue Eagles)

==== Women's tournament ====
**Team standings (Final)**

Rank	Team	Medals				Rec	Points
Rank	Team	1st place, gold medalist(s)	2nd place, silver medalist(s)	3rd place, bronze medalist(s)	**Total**	Rec	Points
1st place, gold medalist(s)	**UP**	2		1	3	1	444
2nd place, silver medalist(s)	Ateneo	6	5	2	13		411
3rd place, bronze medalist(s)	La Salle		1		1		169
4	UST		2	3	5		129
5	UE						6
6	Adamson						0

**Rec** - Number of new swimming records established
Event host in **boldface**

===== Awards =====
- Most Valuable Player: Hannah Dato (Ateneo Lady Eagles)
- Rookie of the Year: Andrea Ann Tiffany Ngui (Ateneo Lady Eagles)

=== Juniors' division ===
==== Boys' tournament ====
**Team standings (Final)**

Rank	Team	Medals				Rec	Points
Rank	Team	1st place, gold medalist(s)	2nd place, silver medalist(s)	3rd place, bronze medalist(s)	**Total**	Rec	Points
1st place, gold medalist(s)	UST	7	5	6	18		356
2nd place, silver medalist(s)	Ateneo	2	9	5	16		312
3rd place, bronze medalist(s)	La Salle						253
4	NU						37
5	UE						25
6	**UP**						16

**Rec** - Number of new swimming records established
Event host in **boldface**

===== Awards =====
- Most Valuable Player: Maurice Sacho Ilustre (Zobel Junior Archers)
- Rookie of the Year: Antonio Dela Rosa (Zobel Junior Archers)

==== Girls' tournament ====
**Team standings (Final)**

Rank	Team	Medals				Rec	Points
Rank	Team	1st place, gold medalist(s)	2nd place, silver medalist(s)	3rd place, bronze medalist(s)	**Total**	Rec	Points
1st place, gold medalist(s)	DLSZ						373
2nd place, silver medalist(s)	UST	5	8	5	18		370
3rd place, bronze medalist(s)	**UPIS**						238
4	Ateneo	1	2	2	4	1	59
5	NU						37
6	UE						14

**Rec** - Number of new swimming records established
Event host in **boldface**

===== Awards =====
- Most Valuable Player: Nicole Meah Pamintuan (Zobel Junior Lady Archers)
- Rookie of the Year:

== Performance sports ==
=== Ballroom dancing ===
The UAAP Season 79 opened with a new competition, Ballroom Dancing. UP swept the competition. The UP Ballroom Formation Team claimed the championship in both Latin-American and Standard Ballroom categories of the inaugural UAAP Ballroom Competition on September 3, 2016, inside the University of Santo Tomas campus in Espana Boulevard, Manila. Ballroom Dancing is a demonstration sport.

=== Cheerdance ===
The UAAP Season 79 cheerdance competition was held on November 19, 2016, at the Smart Araneta Coliseum. It was hosted by University of Santo Tomas, the season's host. University of the Philippines Pep Squad skipped the UAAP Season 79 Cheerdance Competition due to an unresolved protest against last year's results. Cheerdance competition is an exhibition event. Points for the overall championship are not awarded to the participating schools.

==== Team standings ====
Rank	Team	Order	Tumbling	Stunts	Tosses	Pyramids	Dance	Penalties	Points	Percentage
1	NU Pep Squad	7th	89.00	87.00	82.00	84.00	370.00	–1	711.00	88.88%
2	FEU Cheering Squad	4th	82.00	78.00	84.00	83.50	349.00	–18	658.50	82.31%
3	Adamson Pep Squad	5th	64.50	72.50	80.00	89.00	353.00	–4	655.00	81.88%
4	UST Salinggawi Dance Troupe	2nd	80.00	75.00	77.50	78.00	343.50	–4	650.00	81.25%
5	UE Pep Squad	6th	68.50	81.50	87.50	79.50	343.00	–15	645.00	80.63%
6	DLSU Animo Squad	1st	63.00	70.00	69.00	75.00	294.50	–11	560.50	70.06%
7	Ateneo Blue Babble Battalion	3rd	55.50	64.00	67.50	74.00	281.00	–30	512.00	64.00%
-	UP Pep Squad	DNP	-	-	-	-	-	-	-	-

Order refers to order of performance.

Special awards from sponsors:

- Yamaha Best Toss: NU Pep Squad
- Jollibee Over-The-Top Pyramid: NU Pep Squad

==== Group stunts competition ====
Champion	2nd place	3rd place
NU	UST	FEU

=== Streetdance ===
The 4th UAAP Street Dance Competition was held on May 20, 2017, at the UST Plaza Mayor hosted by University of Santo Tomas. Street dance competition is an exhibition event. Points for the general championship are not awarded to the participating schools. NU Underdawgz did not participate for the second straight year.

Rank	Team	Order	Performance Judge A	Performance Judge B	Skill Judge C	Skill Judge D	Penalty Judge E	Points
1st place, gold medalist(s)	La Salle Dance Company – Street	7	44.5	44.0	45.5	44.0	0	89.00
2nd place, silver medalist(s)	UP Street Dance Club	4	43.0	44.5	45.0	45.0	0	88.75
3rd place, bronze medalist(s)	**UST Prime**	3	44.0	45.0	42.5	43.0	0	85.75
4	UE Armada	1	43.0	40.5	36.0	47.0	0	83.25
5	FEU Dance Company	6	35.0	41.5	40.0	42.0	0	79.25
6	Company of Ateneo Dancers (CADS)	5	41.5	37.0	36.5	42.0	0	78.50
7	Adamson CAST	2	32.5	37.5	39.0	41.0	0	75.00

Host team in boldface

== General championship summary ==
The general champion is determined by a point system. The system gives 15 points to the champion team of a UAAP event, 12 to the runner-up, and 10 to the third placer. The following points: 8, 6, 4, 2 and 1 are given to the rest of the participating teams according to their order of finish.

=== Medals table ===
==== Seniors' division ====
Rank	Team	Gold	Silver	Bronze	Total
1	University of Santo Tomas*	7	10	2	19
2	De La Salle University	5	4	7	16
3	National University	5	2	2	9
4	Ateneo de Manila University	4	7	2	13
5	University of the East	3	1	3	7
6	Far Eastern University	2	5	4	11
7	University of the Philippines Diliman	2	0	9	11
8	Adamson University	1	0	0	1
Totals (8 entries)		29	29	29	87

* Host nation (Season host); General champions
Notes: Results are final.

==== Juniors' division ====
Rank	Team	Gold	Silver	Bronze	Total
1	University of Santo Tomas*	3	4	0	7
2	Nazareth School of National University	3	1	0	4
3	Far Eastern University–Diliman	2	0	0	2
4	De La Salle Zobel	1	2	2	5
5	Ateneo de Manila University	0	1	3	4
6	UP Integrated School	0	0	1	1
6	University of the East	0	0	1	1
8	Adamson University	0	0	0	0
Totals (8 entries)		9	8	7	24

* Host nation (Season host); General champions
Notes: Results are final.

=== General championship tally ===
==== Seniors' division ====
		Basketball		Volleyball (indoor)		Volleyball (beach)		Swimming		Chess		Tennis		Table tennis		Badminton		Taekwondo			Judo		Baseball	Softball	Football		Athletics		Fencing		Total			
Rank	Team	M	W	M	W	M	W	M	W	M	W	M	W	M	W	M	W	M	W	C	M	W	M	W	M	W	M	W	M	W	M	W	C	Overall
1	UST (H)	1	6	8	10	15	15	8	8	8	8	12	12	15	12	6	6	15	12	12	15	15	12	12	8	12	12	15	12	10	147	153	12	312
2	La Salle	15	12	4	15	2	10	12	10	6	12	10	6	12	15	8	10	6	4	15	10	8	10	6	4	15	10	8	6	8	115	139	15	269
3	Ateneo	12	4	15	12	4	8	15	12	2	1	8	8	1	1	12	12	2	10	6	12	6	15	2	15	10	4	4	8	12	125	102	6	233
4	UP	4	1	2	6	10	4	10	15	1	6	4	10	6	8	10	15	4	8	10	8	10	4	8	10	8	6	10	10	6	89	115	10	214
5	NU	6	15	12	4	8	6	6	—	15	—	6	15	10	6	15	8	12	15	4	—	—	6	10	6	—	—	—	—	—	102	79	4	185
6	FEU	10	2	10	8	12	12	—	—	12	15	—	—	4	10	4	4	10	2	8	—	—	—	—	12	6	15	12	—	—	89	71	8	168
7	UE	2	10	1	2	1	1	2	6	10	10	15	—	8	4	2	1	8	6	—	6	12	—	4	2	—	8	6	15	15	80	77	0	157
8	Adamson	8	8	6	1	6	2	4	4	4	—	—	—	2	2	1	2	—	—	—	4	4	8	15	1	—	2	2	—	—	46	40	0	86

(H) Season host; = Champion; = Runner-up; = Third place; — = No team.
Notes: Results are final.

==== Juniors' division ====
		Basketball	Volleyball (indoor)		Swimming		Table tennis		Judo	Football	Total		
Rank	Team	B	B	G	B	G	B	G	B	B	B	G	Overall
1	UST (H)	6	12	12	15	12	12	15	15	8	68	39	107
2	DLSZ	8	4	10	10	15	—	—	12	12	46	25	71
2	NSNU	12	15	15	8	6	15	—	—	—	50	21	71
4	Ateneo	10	6	—	12	8	—	—	10	10	48	8	56
5	FEU–D	15	8	6	—	—	—	—	8	15	46	6	52
6	UE	2	10	8	6	4	—	—	6	—	24	12	36
7	UPIS	4	1	2	4	10	—	—	4	—	13	12	25
8	Adamson	1	2	4	—	—	—	—	—	—	3	4	7

(H) Season host; = Champion; = Runner-up; = Third place; — = No team.
Notes: Results are final.

== Broadcast coverage ==
For its 2nd straight season since its broadcast deal renewal, ABS-CBN Sports will provide television and online coverage for all UAAP events. The games will be aired live on S+A Channel 23, S+A HD Channel 166 and their website, sports.abs-cbn.com.

Presenters:

- Boom Gonzalez (Men's Seniors Basketball)
- Eric Tipan (Men's Seniors Basketball)
- Mico Halili (Men's Seniors Basketball)
- Nikko Ramos (Men's Seniors Basketball)

Courtside reporters:

- Niña Alvia (UP)
- Denice Dinsay (Ateneo)
- Bea Escudero (DLSU)
- Ganiel Krishnan (FEU)
- Angelique Manto (UST)
- Stef Monce (Adamson)
- Ira Pablo (NU)
- Pauline Versoza (UE)

Analysts:

- Marco Benitez (Men's Seniors Basketball)
- Enzo Flojo (Men's Seniors Basketball)
- Kirk Long (Men's Seniors Basketball)
- Christian Luanzon (Men's Seniors Basketball)
- Ronnie Magsanoc (Men's Seniors Basketball)
- TJ Manotoc (Men's Seniors Basketball)
- Xavy Nunag (Men's Seniors Basketball)

Upfront at the UAAP hosts

- Janeena Chan
- Bea Daez
- Laura Lehmann
- Tricia Robredo
- Jeanine Tsoi
- Carmela Tunay

Additional hosts:

- UAAP Season 79 Opening Ceremony Hosts:
  TJ Manotoc and Tina Marasigan
- UAAP Season 79 Cheerdance Competition Hosts:
  Nikko Ramos, Gretchen Fullido and Alyssa Valdez

== See also ==
- NCAA Season 92
