= Active consultant =

Basketball coaching role

Occupation
- Names: Consultant
- Occupation type: Profession
- Activity sectors: Sports

Description
- Fields of employment: Basketball, volleyball
- Related jobs: Head coach

The role of active consultant, or simply consultant, in the Philippine Basketball Association (PBA) is the highest coaching role a foreign citizen could normally get in the top-flight professional basketball league due to the head coach role being restricted to Filipino citizens. This is due to a Court of Appeals ruling secured by the Basketball Coaches Association of the Philippines in 2002 barring non-resident foreigners from the head coach's role in the PBA. The employment of consultants by teams of the PBA has been viewed as a "loophole" to this ruling.

== Background ==
The role of head coach is generally restricted to Filipino citizens, due to the efforts of the Basketball Coaches Association of the Philippines (BCAP), an association of local Filipino coaches. The BCAP has historically opposed the practice of hiring foreigners through the Philippine's legal system. The BCAP often cites Article 40 of the Labor Code as argument for their position that foreigners should be restricted from being hired as head coaches, since Filipino coaches were deemed capable of fulfilling the head coach role.

The ruling on employing of foreigners as PBA head coaches has been laid as early as 1990. The BCAP in the early 1990s opposed the appointment of Tim Cone as head coach of the Alaska Aces. Cone, who has been a resident of the Philippines since he was nine years old but at the time has yet to marry his Filipino wife and secure permanent residency, had his 1989-issued work permit revoked in 1991.

Foreigners have served as consultants or advisors to Filipino head coaches in the Philippine Basketball Association (PBA) such as Ron Jacobs with San Miguel in the late 1990s, Rajko Toroman for Petron, and Todd Purves with the San Miguel Beermen.

In 2002, BCAP secured a favorable ruling from the Court of Appeals (CA) with regard to their position of hiring foreign coaches under Article 40 of the Labor Code. The CA ruling became final and executory after it went unchallenged in the Supreme Court.

Employment permit of non-resident aliens. Any alien seeking admission to the Philippines for employment purposes and any domestic or foreign employer who desires to engage an alien for employment in the Philippines shall obtain an employment permit from the Department of Labor.

The employment permit may be issued to a non-resident alien or to the applicant employer after a determination of the non-availability of a person in the Philippines who is competent, able and willing at the time of application to perform the services for which the alien is desired.

For an enterprise registered in preferred areas of investments, said employment permit may be issued upon recommendation of the government agency charged with the supervision of said registered enterprise.

— Article 40. on the Employment of Non-Resident Aliens, Presidential Decree No. 442 (1974), likewise known as the Labor Code

The BCAP in the past has insisted that the ruling also include college basketball such as the UAAP although it has clarified that the ruling doesn't include the head coach role in the Philippine national team due to its "temporary" nature. Ateneo consultant Tab Baldwin was ruled as a head coach by the UAAP in UAAP Season 79 (2016), after complaints from other teams. Baldwin was seen drawing out plays and barking instructions, but since he is not the head coach, any technical fouls called on team personnel other than the head coach falls on the head coach and not on the erring personnel. This would have seen a hypothetical scenario where then coach Sandy Arespacochaga would be ejected from the game from Baldwin's actions, with Baldwin himself remaining on the bench.

The role is not restricted to foreigners. Caloy Garcia, a Filipino, took the role of active consultant for Rain and Shine after serving as head coach for the team. Chot Reyes took the role of senior consultant for the TNT Tropang Giga's campaign in the 2023 PBA Governors' Cup so he could focus more on coaching the Philippine national team.

=== Role ===
The consultant role in theory serves as an advisor to the head coach, a position which is usually reserved for Filipino citizens, by imparting their coaching experience. In practice, they could play a big role in leading the team during actual games. There are duties that a consultant could not make, such as speaking in behalf of the team during press conferences, which is done by the head coach.

Foreigners working as consultants need to secure a working permit from the Department of Labor and Employment.

=== Head coach eligibility for foreigners ===
The Basketball Coaches Association of the Philippines (BCAP) has laid out exemptions on the prohibition of PBA teams hiring foreigners as head coaches. The coach association has said that they won't oppose the hiring of foreigners as head coaches, who they deem have "enough experience and knowledge", which they could impart to local coaches under a "transfer of technology" set-up. Coaches who reportedly satisfy this conditions include:

- Former coaches of NBA teams
- Former coaches of NCAA Division I teams who have brought their side to the Final Four.

Foreigners with permanent residency are likewise exempted from the head coach restriction on foreign nationals. Such is the case for Ron Jacobs, Tim Cone, and Norman Black after they have married Filipino nationals.

=== Extended usage into volleyball ===
The term “active consultant” has also been used in Philippine volleyball, although its usage is less formally established than in basketball as it has only been used once thus far.

In 2025, Finnish coach Aleksi Lähteenmäki was appointed as head coach of the Letran Lady Knights of the NCAA on the condition that during the league's season, he would be reassigned as an “active consultant” to play safe and not worry about potentially being sanctioned by the league, who is historically known to subtly promote pro-Filipino, anti-foreigner stance. Instead, assistant coach Mayeth Carolino is listed as the team's head coach. In other leagues, including the Shakey's Super League and V-League, Lähteenmäki is listed as the Lady Knights' head coach.

== List of consultants ==
=== Foreign ===
==== Active consultants ====
- (Serbia) Rajko Toroman – Petron Blaze Boosters (2012–2013) Barako Bull Energy (2013), Converge FiberXers (2023–present),
  - Listed head coach: Olsen Racela (Petron), Bong Ramos (Barako Bull), Franco Atienza (Converge; 2023-2025), Dennis Pineda (Converge; 2025-2026)
- (United States) Todd Purves – Petron Blaze Boosters / San Miguel Beermen (2013–2014)
  - Listed head coach: Biboy Ravanes
- (United States) / (New Zealand) Tab Baldwin – Ateneo Blue Eagles (2015-2016)
  - Listed head coach: Sandy Arespacochaga
- (New Zealand) Mark Dickel – TNT Katropa / TNT Tropang Giga (2018–2020)
  - Listed head coach: Bong Ravena
- (United States) Jermaine Byrd – De La Salle Green Archers (2019–2020)
  - Listed head coach: Gian Nazario
- (Serbia) Nenad Vucinic – Meralco Bolts (2023–present)
  - Listed head coach: Luigi Trillo
- (Serbia) Djordje Jovičić – Converge FiberXers (2026-present)
  - Listed head coach: Dennis Pineda
- (Finland) Aleksi Lähteenmäki – Letran Lady Knights (2025–present)
  - Listed head coach: Mayeth Carolino

==== Consultant (Assistant coach-type) ====
- (United States) Norman Black – Ateneo Blue Eagles (2004–2005), Talk 'N Text Tropang Textes (2010–2012), San Beda Red Lions (2022–present)
- (United States) Bobby Parks – NU Bulldogs (2012)
- (Serbia) Slavoljub Gorunovic – TNT Tropang Giga (2023)
- (United States) / (New Zealand) Tab Baldwin – Philippines (2013–14), TNT Tropang Giga (2014–2020)
- (United States) Sean Chambers – Alaska Aces (2017–2019)
- (Serbia) Rajko Toroman – Benilde Blazers (2023–present)
- (Serbia) Djordje Jovičić – Converge FiberXers (2025–2026)

==== Consultant (Demoted coach) ====
- (United States) Norman Black – Ateneo Blue Eagles (2012–2014), Meralco Bolts (2023–present)

==== Consultant (Concurrently for two teams) ====
- (United States) Ron Jacobs – San Miguel Beermen (1999–2002), Barangay Ginebra Kings (2000–2002)

==== Consultant (minimal and limited role) ====
- (United States) Todd Purves – San Miguel Beermen (2014–2015)

=== Filipino ===
==== Active consultant ====
- Lawrence Chongson – UE Red Warriors (2019)
  - Listed head coach: Bong Tan
- Charles Tiu – Benilde Blazers (2026–present)
  - Listed head coach: Paolo Layug

==== Senior consultant (Temporary demoted as coach, special position) ====
- Chot Reyes – TNT Tropang Giga (2023–2024)

==== Consultant (Demoted head coach) ====
- Derrick Pumaren – Pop Cola Panthers (1997)
- Alfrancis Chua – Sta. Lucia Realtors (2007–2008)
- Bert Flores – FEU Tamaraws (2007–2010)
- Caloy Garcia – Rain or Shine Elasto Painters (2021)
- Jason Webb – Magnolia Hotshots (2017–2025)
- Boyet Fernandez – San Beda Red Lions (2022–present)
- Leo Austria – San Miguel Beermen (2023–2024)
- Jorge Gallent – San Miguel Beermen (2024–present)
- Jamike Jarin – Phoenix Fuel Masters (2025–2026)

==== Consultant (Assistant coach type) ====
- Domingo Panganiban – Purefoods Hotdogs (1988–1994)
- Turo Valenzona – Pop Cola Panthers (1997), San Sebastian Stags (2010–2013), Muntinlupa Cagers (2019)
- Andy Jao – Red Bull Barako (2000–2009)
- Bonnie Garcia – Air21 Express (2002–2003)
- Derrick Pumaren – UE Red Warriors (2004–2008), TNT Tropang Giga (2005–2006)
- Jong Uichico – De La Salle Green Archers (2011–2012), Meralco Bolts (2012–2014), TNT Tropang Giga (2014)
- Boyet Fernandez – UP Fighting Maroons (2010)
- Eric Altamirano – NU Bulldogs (2010–2011)
- Alfrancis Chua – Barangay Ginebra San Miguel (2012–2013)
- Joe Lipa – Columbian Dyip (2014–2017)
- Franz Pumaren – GlobalPort Batang Pier (2016)
- Jimmy Alapag – Meralco Bolts (2016–2017)
- Ariel Vanguardia – Blu Star Detergent Dragons (2016)
- Bo Perasol – Mighty Sports (2016)
- Vince Hizon – Blackwater Bossing (2017–2019)
- Art dela Cruz – Columbian Dyip (2018–2019)
- Allan Caidic – San Sebastian Stags (2024–2025), UE Red Warriors (2026–present)
- Erick Arejola – Magnolia Hotshots (2025–present)

==== Consultant (multiple teams at the same time) ====
- Andy Jao – TNT Tropang Giga, Meralco Bolts, Philippines, Ateneo Blue Eagles, San Beda
