= Shaina Nitura =

Filipino volleyball player

Shaina Marie Nitura
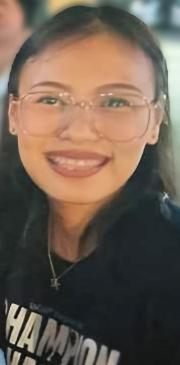
- Shai Nitura at the UAAP high school volleyball championship celebration

Personal information
- Nickname: Shai
- Nationality: Filipino
- Born: November 18, 2004 (age 21)
- Home town: Cainta, Rizal, Philippines
- Height: 1.75 m (5 ft 9 in)
- Spike: 305 cm (120 in)
- Block: 285 cm (112 in)

Volleyball information
- Position: Outside spiker
- Current team: Adamson Lady Falcons, Alas Pilipinas
- Number: 1
Honours
Women's volleyball
Representing Philippines
Asian Nations Cup
Silver medal – second place	2025 Hanoi	Alas Pilipinas
SEA Women's V.League
Bronze medal – third place	2025 First Leg (Nakhon Ratchasima)	Alas Pilipinas
Bronze medal – third place	2025 Second Leg (Ninh Binh)	Alas Pilipinas

Shaina Marie Nitura (born November 18, 2004) is a Filipino volleyball player. She is currently playing as an outside spiker for Alas Pilipinas and the Adamson Lady Falcons of the University Athletic Association of the Philippines, where she broke four records in just her rookie season in 2025.

== Personal life ==
Following the footsteps of their father, Nitura and her siblings, including Judiel, are all student-athletes.

== Volleyball career ==
=== UAAP ===
Nitura was a member of the Adamson Lady Baby Falcons and was the team captain. In 2023, she won the 1st Best Outside Hitter award in the UAAP Season 85 high school girls' volleyball, with her team reaching the finals.

In 2024, the Lady Baby Falcons had a 14–0 sweep throughout the tournament and Nitura bagged the 1st Best Outside Hitter award for the second straight season. It was an outright finals berth for them, with FEU, NU Nazareth School, and UST figuring in a step-ladder semifinal round. The UAAP also awarded her Season 86 MVP and Finals MVP after Adamson dethroned NUNS in Game 2 with a score of 25–18, 25–18, 28-26 even as Game 1 ended in three sets, too.

On February 17, 2024, Nitura announced that she would remain with Adamson to play college volleyball.

==== Season 87 ====
The Lady Falcons quickly appointed her team captain in her rookie season.

==== Beach Volleyball Tournament ====
They knocked out the Ateneo Blue Eagles in the final four contention of Season 87 UAAP beach volleyball championships.

==== Volleyball Tournament ====
On February 16, 2025, Nitura broke the record for a UAAP rookie, hitting 33 points as the Lady Falcons got a winning start in Season 87 at the expense of the Blue Eagles, 21–25, 20–25, 25–12, 25–15, 15–12 at the jampacked Mall of Asia Arena.

On March 16, 2025, she set a new single-game scoring record with 38 points in a match despite the loss against the University of the Philippines, surpassing the previous 35 marks held by former Ateneo standout Alyssa Valdez (2013 Season 75) and University of Santo Tomas's Sisi Rondina (2019 Season 81).

Wrapping up the 2025 UAAP Season 87 women's volleyball tournament, Nitura set multiple records. She tallied 371 total points (built on 333 attacks, 25 blocks, and 13 service aces); breaking the longstanding single-season scoring record of 312 points set in 2015 Season 77 by Alyssa Valdez. She was also the first first-year player in the UAAP women's volleyball tournament to reach the 30-point mark six times.

On May 14, 2025, Nitura was named the UAAP Season 87 Rookie of the Year in recognition of her record-breaking debut season.

==== Season 88 Most Valuable Player campaign ====
In the UAAP Season 88 women's volleyball tournament, Nitura was named the Most Valuable Player, becoming the first player from the Adamson Lady Falcons to earn the distinction in the women's division.

Nitura topped the league in scoring for the second consecutive season with 284 points, built on 248 attacks, 24 blocks, and 12 service aces, while helping Adamson return to the Final Four for the first time in three years. She also ranked among the league leaders in several statistical categories, finishing third in spiking efficiency, seventh in service, fourth in reception efficiency, and eighth in digging.

She also received the Season 88 1st Best Outside Spiker award after finishing with the highest ranking points among outside hitters.

In the UAAP Season 88 women's volleyball tournament, Nitura helped lead the Adamson Lady Falcons back to the Final Four for the first time in three years. Adamson entered the stepladder semifinals against the UST Golden Tigresses, whom they had defeated twice in the elimination round, both in straight sets. However, UST eliminated the well-rested Lady Falcons in a knockout match with a straight-sets victory, ending Adamson's campaign.

In the loss, Nitura finished with 13 points, while teammate Frances Mordi added 11 points. UST's defense limited Adamson to a low attacking efficiency throughout the match.

Her season also marked one of the rare instances in UAAP women's volleyball history in which the league MVP failed to reach the finals, the last occurrence being in Season 80 when Jaja Santiago of National University won the award despite her team's semifinal elimination.

==== Family milestone ====
Following her standout collegiate campaign, Nitura was named the UAAP Season 88 Most Valuable Player, adding another milestone for the Nitura family in Philippine collegiate volleyball. Earlier in 2026, her sister Judiel Nitura earned the Finals Most Valuable Player award in the NCAA Season 101 women's volleyball tournament after helping the Letran Lady Knights secure the championship.

=== International ===
Nitura, Bella Belen, Angel Canino, and Alyssa Solomon gave a 2–0 win-loss slate to the Philippines when Alas Pilipinas, powered by these UAAP stars, swept Mongolia (25–18, 25–16, 25–14) and edged Indonesia (22–25, 25–23, 25–13, 28–26) at the AVC Women's Volleyball Nations Cup at the Dong Anh Gymnasium in Hanoi, Vietnam in June 2025.

== Awards ==
=== Individual ===
UAAP

MVP Award	Positional Award	Ref
2 (2024, 2026)	4 (2023, 2024, 2025, 2026)	

Year	League	Season	Award	Ref
2023	UAAP	85 (Girls' volleyball – Juniors)	1st Best Outside Hitter	
2024	UAAP	86 (Girls' volleyball – Juniors)	Athlete of the Year	
2024	UAAP	86 (Girls' volleyball – Juniors)	MVP (Season)	
2024	UAAP	86 (Girls' volleyball – Juniors)	Finals MVP	
2024	UAAP	86 (Girls' volleyball – Juniors)	1st Best Outside Hitter	
2024	Shakey's	2024 Shakey's Girls Volleyball Invitational League	MVP (Season)	
2024	Siklab Sports Youth	2024 Siklab Sports Youth	Super Kids Award	
2025	UAAP	87 (Women's volleyball – Seniors)	Rookie of the Year	
2025	V-League	2025 V-League Collegiate Challenge	MVP (Season)	
2025	V-League	2025 V-League Collegiate Challenge	Finals MVP	
2025	V-League	2025 V-League Collegiate Challenge	1st Best Outside Spiker	
2026	UAAP	88 (Women's volleyball – Seniors)	MVP (Season)	
2026	UAAP	88 (Women's volleyball – Seniors)	1st Best Outside Spiker	

=== Team awards ===
Year	Tournament	Team	Result	Ref
2026	2026 V-League Collegiate Challenge	Adamson Lady Falcons	Champions	
2025	2025 V-League Collegiate Challenge	Adamson Lady Falcons	Champions	

=== High school ===
Year	Tournament	Team	Result	Ref
2023	UAAP Season 85 volleyball tournaments	Adamson Lady Baby Falcons	Runner-up	
2024	UAAP Season 86 volleyball tournaments	Adamson Lady Baby Falcons	Champions	
2024	2024 Shakey's Girls Volleyball Invitational League	Adamson Lady Baby Falcons	Champions	

=== National team ===
Year	Tournament	Team	Result	Ref
2025	2025 AVC Women's Volleyball Nations Cup	Alas Pilipinas	Runner-up	
2025	2025 SEA Women's V.League – First Leg	Alas Pilipinas	Bronze medal	
2025	2025 SEA Women's V.League – Second Leg	Alas Pilipinas	Bronze medal	
