= 2026 V-League Collegiate Challenge =

Fourth season of the V-League revival

- League: V-League
- Sport: Volleyball
- Duration: August 15, 2026 – October 11, 2026
- Matches: M: 37; W: 35
- Teams: M: 8; W: 8
- Season MVP: M Zhydryx Saavedra (FEU); W Frances Mordi (Adamson)
- Finals champions: M NU Bulldogs; W Adamson Lady Falcons
- Runners-up: M FEU Tamaraws; W UST Golden Tigresses
- Finals MVP: M Jade Disquitado (NU); W Frances Mordi (Adamson)

V-League Collegiate Challenge seasons
- ← 2025 2027 →

The 2026 V-League Collegiate Challenge was the fifth season of the revival of the V-League of the Philippines. The tournament started on August 15, 2026, at the Gameville Central Park in Mandaluyong, with both divisions having eight competing teams.

On August 29, 2026, V-League postponed the August 30 matches, due to the red rainfall warning over Metro Manila resulting to inclement weather. The affected matches have been rescheduled to September 9.

== Participating teams ==
Team	School	Collegiate league
Men's division
Arellano Chiefs	Arellano University	NCAA
Benilde Blazers	De La Salle–College of Saint Benilde	NCAA
De La Salle Green Spikers	De La Salle University	UAAP
FEU Tamaraws	Far Eastern University	UAAP
Letran Knights	Colegio de San Juan de Letran	NCAA
Mapúa Cardinals	Mapúa University	NCAA
NU Bulldogs	National University	UAAP
UST Golden Spikers	University of Santo Tomas	UAAP
Women's division
Adamson Lady Falcons	Adamson University	UAAP
Arellano Lady Chiefs	Arellano University	NCAA
Benilde Lady Blazers	De La Salle–College of Saint Benilde	NCAA
Letran Lady Knights	Colegio de San Juan de Letran	NCAA
Perpetual Lady Altas	University of Perpetual Help System DALTA	NCAA
San Beda Lady Red Spikers	San Beda University	NCAA
UE Lady Red Warriors	University of the East	UAAP
UST Golden Tigresses	University of Santo Tomas	UAAP

== Venues ==
Preliminaries	Semifinals, Finals
Mandaluyong	San Juan
Gameville Central Park (GCP)	Filoil Centre (FIL)
Capacity: 150	Capacity: 6,000
-	

== Format ==
The following format is being conducted in both tournaments for the entirety of the season:

Preliminary round

- The preliminary round is a single round-robin tournament, with each team playing one match against all other teams for a total of seven matches. Teams are ranked using the FIVB Ranking System.
- The top four teams will advance to the semifinals.
- Teams ranked fifth through eighth will be eliminated and be ranked accordingly.

Semifinals

- The semifinals will be composed best-of-three series. The winners advance to the championship series while the losers play in the third-place match.
- The match-ups will be as follows:
  - SF1: QF1 winner vs. QF4 winner
  - SF2: QF2 winner vs. QF3 winner

Finals

- The championship (gold medal) will be a best-of-three series while the third-place match (bronze medal) will be a singular match.
- The match-ups will be as follows:
  - Championship match: Semifinal round winners
  - Third-place match: Semifinal round losers

== Pool standing procedure ==
- First, teams are ranked by the number of matches won.
- If the number of matches won is tied, the tied teams are then ranked by match points, wherein:
  - Match won 3–0 or 3–1: 3 match points for the winner, 0 match points for the loser.
  - Match won 3–2: 2 match points for the winner, 1 match point for the loser.
- In case of any further ties, the following criteria shall be used:
  - Set ratio: the number of sets won divided by number of sets lost.
  - Point ratio: number of points scored divided by number of points allowed.
  - Head-to-head standings: any remaining tied teams are ranked based on the results of head-to-head matches involving the teams in question.

== Men's tournament ==
- All times are Philippine Standard Time (UTC+8:00).

=== Preliminary round ===
==== Standings ====
Pos	Team	Pld	W	L	Pts	SW	SL	SR	SPW	SPL	SPR	Qualification
1	FEU Tamaraws	7	7	0	19	21	4	5.250	600	495	1.212	Semifinals
2	NU Bulldogs	7	5	2	16	19	8	2.375	617	547	1.128	Semifinals
3	Letran Knights	7	5	2	12	16	13	1.231	669	561	1.193	Semifinals
4	Benilde Blazers	7	3	4	11	15	16	0.938	679	695	0.977	Semifinals
5	UST Golden Spikers	7	3	4	10	14	15	0.933	628	648	0.969	
6	Arellano Chiefs	7	2	5	6	9	18	0.500	553	624	0.886	
7	De La Salle Green Spikers	7	2	5	6	7	16	0.438	502	544	0.923	
8	Mapúa Cardinals	7	1	6	4	8	19	0.421	572	716	0.799	

Source: V-League

==== Match results ====
Date	Time	Venue		Score		Set 1	Set 2	Set 3	Set 4	Set 5	Total	Report
Aug. 15	15:00	GCP	Letran Knights	1–3	Arellano Chiefs	21–25	25–18	20–25	28–30		94–98	
Aug. 15	17:00	GCP	NU Bulldogs	3–2	UST Golden Spikers	25–16	25–15	20–25	22–25	16–14	108–95	
Aug. 16	15:00	GCP	UST Golden Spikers	1–3	Letran Knights	24–26	25–22	16–25	23–25		88–98	
Aug. 16	17:00	GCP	De La Salle Green Spikers	0–3	NU Bulldogs	23–25	16–25	20–25			59–75	
Aug. 22	10:00	GCP	Mapúa Cardinals	1–3	Benilde Blazers	25–19	22–25	21–25	21–25		89–94	
Aug. 22	12:00	GCP	NU Bulldogs	2–3	Letran Knights	31–29	24–26	25–17	18–25	11–15	109–112	
Aug. 23	10:00	GCP	Benilde Blazers	3–2	Arellano Chiefs	25–22	22–25	25–20	22–25	15–11	109–103	
Aug. 23	12:00	GCP	De La Salle Green Spikers	3–1	Mapúa Cardinals	21–25	25–23	25–19	25–20		96–87	
Aug. 29	15:00	GCP	Letran Knights	3–2	Benilde Blazers	25–17	22–25	23–25	27–25	15–13	112–105	
Aug. 29	17:00	GCP	Arellano Chiefs	3–2	UST Golden Spikers	23–25	25–22	25–16	13–25	15–12	101–100	
Sep. 05	10:00	GCP	De La Salle Green Spikers	3–0	Arellano Chiefs	25–21	25–21	25–20			75–62	
Sep. 05	12:00	GCP	FEU Tamaraws	3–0	Mapúa Cardinals	25–19	25–22	25–15			75–56	
Sep. 06	10:00	GCP	Benilde Blazers	2–3	FEU Tamaraws	19–25	25–23	27–25	25–27	11–15	107–115	
Sep. 06	12:00	GCP	Letran Knights	3–0	De La Salle Green Spikers	25–18	29–27	25–23			79–68	
Sep. 09	15:00	GCP	NU Bulldogs	3–0	Mapúa Cardinals	25–22	25–14	25–19			75–55	
Sep. 09	17:00	GCP	UST Golden Spikers	3–0	De La Salle Green Spikers	25–23	25–21	25–23			75–67	
Sep. 12	15:00	GCP	Mapúa Cardinals	1–3	UST Golden Spikers	25–22	19–25	23–25	24–26		91–98	
Sep. 12	17:00	GCP	NU Bulldogs	3–0	Benilde Blazers	25–18	25–18	31–29			81–65	
Sep. 13	15:00	GCP	Letran Knights	3–2	Mapúa Cardinals	23–25	27–25	25–14	19–25	15–9	109–98	
Sep. 13	17:00	GCP	FEU Tamaraws	3–0	Arellano Chiefs	25–16	25–14	25–19			75–49	
Sep. 19	10:00	GCP	Arellano Chiefs	1–3	Mapúa Cardinals	24–26	14–25	25–17	26–28		89–96	
Sep. 19	12:00	GCP	De La Salle Green Spikers	0–3	FEU Tamaraws	23–25	19–25	18–25			60–75	
Sep. 20	10:00	GCP	Benilde Blazers	2–3	UST Golden Spikers	15–25	25–22	22–25	26–24	20–22	108–118	
Sep. 20	12:00	GCP	FEU Tamaraws	3–2	NU Bulldogs	25–21	22–25	23–25	25–22	15–11	110–104	
Sep. 26	15:00	GCP	NU Bulldogs	3–0	Arellano Chiefs	25–20	25–17	25–14			75–51	
Sep. 26	17:00	GCP	UST Golden Spikers	0–3	FEU Tamaraws	20–25	21–25	13–25			54–75	
Sep. 27	15:00	GCP	De La Salle Green Spikers	1–3	Benilde Blazers	25–16	18–25	14–25	20–25		77–91	
Sep. 27	17:00	GCP	FEU Tamaraws	3–0	Letran Knights	25–20	25–22	25–23			75–65	

=== Final round ===
- All times are Philippine Standard Time (UTC+8:00).
- Battle for bronze is a knockout match.
- Championship is a best-of-three series.

Semifinals
1	FEU Tamaraws	3	3
4	Benilde Blazers	0	0
2	NU Bulldogs	3	2	3
3	Letran Knights	0	3	0

Championship
FEU Tamaraws	0	3	2
NU Bulldogs	3	0	3
Third place
Benilde Blazers	0
Letran Knights	3

==== Semifinals ====
Rank 1 vs Rank 4

Date	Time	Venue		Score		Set 1	Set 2	Set 3	Set 4	Set 5	Total	Report
Sep. 30	15:00	FIL	FEU Tamaraws	3–0	Benilde Blazers	25–22	25–21	25–22			75–65	
Oct. 03	12:00	FIL	Benilde Blazers	0–3	FEU Tamaraws	25–23	25–22	25–18			75–63	

Rank 2 vs Rank 3

Date	Time	Venue		Score		Set 1	Set 2	Set 3	Set 4	Set 5	Total	Report
Sep. 30	17:00	FIL	NU Bulldogs	3–0	Letran Knights	25–19	25–14	25–23			75–56	
Oct. 03	10:00	FIL	Letran Knights	3–2	NU Bulldogs	22–25	25–23	29–27	13–25	20–18	109–118	
Oct. 04	14:00	FIL	NU Bulldogs	3–0	Letran Knights	25–14	25–23	25–20			75–57	

==== 3rd place match ====
Date	Time	Venue		Score		Set 1	Set 2	Set 3	Set 4	Set 5	Total	Report
Oct. 07	10:00	FIL	Benilde Blazers	0–3	Letran Knights	19–25	17–25	18–25			54–75	

==== Championship ====
Date	Time	Venue		Score		Set 1	Set 2	Set 3	Set 4	Set 5	Total	Report
Oct. 07	18:30	FIL	FEU Tamaraws	0–3	NU Bulldogs	14–25	37–39	22–25			73–89	
Oct. 09	17:00	FIL	NU Bulldogs	0–3	FEU Tamaraws	22–25	22–25	20–25			64–75	
Oct. 11	14:00	FIL	FEU Tamaraws	2–3	NU Bulldogs	25–23	25–19	28–30	21–25	14–16	113–113	

2026 V-League Collegiate Challenge Men's Champions
NU Bulldogs
2nd title

== Women's tournament ==
- All times are Philippine Standard Time (UTC+8:00).

=== Preliminary round ===
==== Standings ====
Pos	Team	Pld	W	L	Pts	SW	SL	SR	SPW	SPL	SPR	Qualification
1	Adamson Lady Falcons	7	6	1	19	20	4	5.000	663	558	1.188	Semifinals
2	Arellano Lady Chiefs	7	5	2	12	17	12	1.417	549	536	1.024	Semifinals
3	UST Golden Tigresses	7	4	3	12	14	11	1.273	547	529	1.034	Semifinals
4	UE Lady Red Warriors	7	4	3	12	16	14	1.143	643	635	1.013	Semifinals
5	Perpetual Lady Altas	7	3	4	10	11	13	0.846	450	494	0.911	
6	San Beda Lady Red Spikers	7	3	4	7	10	17	0.588	670	690	0.971	
7	Benilde Lady Blazers	7	2	5	8	11	17	0.647	596	624	0.955	
8	Letran Lady Knights	7	1	6	4	6	18	0.333	493	554	0.890	

Source: V-League

==== Match results ====
Date	Time	Venue		Score		Set 1	Set 2	Set 3	Set 4	Set 5	Total	Report
Aug. 15	10:00	GCP	Letran Lady Knights	0–3	Arellano Lady Chiefs	20–25	22–25	15–25			57–75	
Aug. 15	12:00	GCP	Benilde Lady Blazers	2–3	UE Lady Red Warriors	21–25	16–25	25–22	25–14	8–15	95–101	
Aug. 16	10:00	GCP	Adamson Lady Falcons	3–0	Perpetual Lady Altas	25–21	25–18	25–22			75–61	
Aug. 16	12:00	GCP	San Beda Lady Red Spikers	0–3	UST Golden Tigresses	15–25	16–25	19–25			50–75	
Aug. 22	15:00	GCP	Arellano Lady Chiefs	3–2	UST Golden Tigresses	25–21	21–25	31–33	25–23	15–13	117–115	
Aug. 22	17:00	GCP	Perpetual Lady Altas	3–1	San Beda Lady Red Spikers	25–22	28–26	21–25	25–21		99–94	
Aug. 23	15:00	GCP	UE Lady Red Warriors	0–3	Adamson Lady Falcons	18–25	23–25	16–25			57–75	
Aug. 23	17:00	GCP	Letran Lady Knights	1–3	Benilde Lady Blazers	19–25	25–18	21–25	18–25		83–93	
Aug. 29	10:00	GCP	Benilde Lady Blazers	2–3	Arellano Lady Chiefs	25–19	17–25	32–34	25–16	7–15	106–109	
Aug. 29	12:00	GCP	Adamson Lady Falcons	3–0	Letran Lady Knights	25–17	25–18	25–16			75–51	
Sep. 05	15:00	GCP	Perpetual Lady Altas	0–3	Arellano Lady Chiefs	19–25	16–25	18–25			53–75	
Sep. 05	17:00	GCP	UE Lady Red Warriors	2–3	UST Golden Tigresses	26–24	17–25	23–25	25–20	5–15	96–109	
Sep. 06	15:00	GCP	Letran Lady Knights	2–3	San Beda Lady Red Spikers	25–18	18–25	23–25	25–16	16–18	107–102	
Sep. 06	17:00	GCP	Benilde Lady Blazers	1–3	Adamson Lady Falcons	26–24	17–25	18–25	23–25		84–99	
Sep. 09	10:00	GCP	San Beda Lady Red Spikers	3–2	UE Lady Red Warriors	25–17	21–25	21–25	25–22	20–18	112–107	
Sep. 09	12:00	GCP	UST Golden Tigresses	0–3	Perpetual Lady Altas	15–25	18–25	18–25			51–75	
Sep. 12	10:00	GCP	Adamson Lady Falcons	2–3	Arellano Lady Chiefs	23–25	25–12	22–25	25–14	13–15	108–91	
Sep. 12	12:00	GCP	San Beda Lady Red Spikers	1–3	Benilde Lady Blazers	14–25	22–25	25–21	19–25		80–96	
Sep. 13	10:00	GCP	UST Golden Tigresses	3–0	Letran Lady Knights	25–21	25–19	25–19			75–59	
Sep. 13	12:00	GCP	Perpetual Lady Altas	2–3	UE Lady Red Warriors	25–22	22–25	17–25	25–23	12–15	101–110	
Sep. 19	15:00	GCP	Letran Lady Knights	0–3	UE Lady Red Warriors	23–25	20–25	18–25			61–75	
Sep. 19	17:00	GCP	Benilde Lady Blazers	0–3	Perpetual Lady Altas	19–25	25–27	21–25			65–77	
Sep. 20	15:00	GCP	San Beda Lady Red Spikers	3–1	Arellano Lady Chiefs	25–20	25–11	20–25	25–23		95–79	
Sep. 20	17:00	GCP	UST Golden Tigresses	0–3	Adamson Lady Falcons	23–25	17–25	17–25			57–75	
Sep. 26	10:00	GCP	Arellano Lady Chiefs	1–3	UE Lady Red Warriors	20–25	25–22	22–25	15–25		82–97	
Sep. 26	12:00	GCP	Letran Lady Knights	3–0	Perpetual Lady Altas	25–20	25–17	25–22			75–59	
Sep. 27	10:00	GCP	Benilde Lady Blazers	0–3	UST Golden Tigresses	23–25	16–25	18–25			57–75	
Sep. 27	12:00	GCP	Adamson Lady Falcons	3–0	San Beda Lady Red Spikers	26–24	25–19	25–19			76–62	

=== Final round ===
- All times are Philippine Standard Time (UTC+8:00).
- Battle for bronze is a knockout match.
- Championship is a best-of-three series.

Semifinals
1	Adamson Lady Falcons	3	3
4	UE Lady Red Warriors	0	0
2	Arellano Lady Chiefs	0	0
3	UST Golden Tigresses	3	3

Championship
Adamson Lady Falcons	3	3
UST Golden Tigresses	2	1
Third place
Arellano Lady Chiefs	0
UE Lady Red Warriors	3

==== Semifinals ====
Rank 1 vs Rank 4

Date	Time	Venue		Score		Set 1	Set 2	Set 3	Set 4	Set 5	Total	Report
Sep. 30	10:00	FIL	Adamson Lady Falcons	3–0	UE Lady Red Warriors	25–22	25–17	25–17			75–56	
Oct. 03	17:00	FIL	UE Lady Red Warriors	0–3	Adamson Lady Falcons	21–25	17–25	20–25			58–75	

Rank 2 vs Rank 3

Date	Time	Venue		Score		Set 1	Set 2	Set 3	Set 4	Set 5	Total	Report
Sep. 30	12:00	FIL	Arellano Lady Chiefs	0–3	UST Golden Tigresses	12–25	18–25	13–25			43–75	
Oct. 03	15:00	FIL	UST Golden Tigresses	3–0	Arellano Lady Chiefs	25–16	25–21	25–15			75–52	

==== 3rd place match ====
Date	Time	Venue		Score		Set 1	Set 2	Set 3	Set 4	Set 5	Total	Report
Oct. 07	13:00	FIL	Arellano Lady Chiefs	0–3	UE Lady Red Warriors	23–25	22–25	26–28			71–78	

==== Championship ====
Date	Time	Venue		Score		Set 1	Set 2	Set 3	Set 4	Set 5	Total	Report
Oct. 07	16:00	FIL	Adamson Lady Falcons	3–2	UST Golden Tigresses	22–25	25–19	25–16	27–25	15–12	114–97	
Oct. 09	14:00	FIL	UST Golden Tigresses	1–3	Adamson Lady Falcons	23–25	25–23	24–26	15–25		87–99	

2026 V-League Collegiate Challenge Women's Champions
Adamson Lady Falcons
2nd title

== Awards and medalists ==
=== Individual awards ===
Award	Men's	Women's	Ref.
Conference Most Valuable Player	Zhydryx Saavedra (FEU)	Frances Mordi (Adamson)	
Finals Most Valuable Player	Jade Disquitado (NU)|	Frances Mordi (Adamson)	
Best Setter	Rhodson Du-ot (FEU)	Felicity Sagaysay (Adamson)	
Best Outside Spiker	Amet Bituin (FEU); Jade Disquitado (NU)	Frances Mordi (Adamson); Angeline Poyos (UST)	
Best Middle Blocker	Doula Ndongala (FEU); Vince Himzon (Letran)	Princess Eloisa Dote (Adamson); Janna Mabelle Dizon (Adamson)	
Best Opposite Spiker	Zhydryx Saavedra (FEU)	Lhouriz Tuddao (Adamson)	
Best Libero	Luke Cordero (Letran)	Angelica Reyes (UE)	
Nestlé Crunch coolest of all time	Rey Miguel De Vega (UST)	Angelina Robles (UST)	

=== Medalists ===
Division	Gold	Silver	Bronze
Men's			
Women's			

== Final standings ==
Rank	Men's	Women's
1st place, gold medalist(s)	NU Bulldogs	Adamson Lady Falcons
2nd place, silver medalist(s)	FEU Tamaraws	UST Golden Tigresses
3rd place, bronze medalist(s)	Letran Knights	UE Lady Red Warriors
4	Benilde Blazers	Arellano Lady Chiefs
5	UST Golden Spikers	Perpetual Lady Altas
6	Arellano Chiefs	San Beda Lady Red Spikers
7	De La Salle Green Spikers	Benilde Lady Blazers
8	Mapúa Cardinals	Letran Lady Knights

Qualified for the 2026 Spikers' Turf Invitational Conference

The top two teams in the men's division qualifies for the 2026 Spikers' Turf Invitational Conference.

== See also ==
- 2026 V-League Visayas season
