= Djordje Jovičić =

Serbian basketball coach (born 1976)

Converge FiberXers
- Position: Active consultant
- League: PBA

Personal information
- Born: May 18, 1976 (age 50)

Career history

Coaching
- 2022–2023: Pelita Jaya
- 2025–present: Converge FiberXers (consultant)

Djordje Jovičić (born 18 May 1976) is a Serbian basketball coach previously served as a consultant for the Converge FiberXers of the Philippine Basketball Association.

== Education ==
Djordje Jovičić attended the University of Belgrade from 1995 to 2000 where he pursued a degree in sport and physical education. He received a masters' degree in basketball at the Basketball Academy Belgrade.

== Career ==
Jovičić worked in several countries like his home country Serbia, Romania, China, Indonesia, and in the Philippines. He served on his home country's different youth basketball clubs. He also coaching some youth clubs in pampanga.

In October 2022, Jovičić was appointed as head coach of Pelita Jaya in the lead up to the 2023 season of the Indonesian Basketball League. The team lost to Prawira Bandung in the finals. Jovičić left the team by the end of 2023.

In September 2025, Jovičić was hired as consultant of Converge FiberXers of the Philippine Basketball Association, joining another fellow Serbian coach Rajko Toroman. He helped the team to push the team into semifinals.
