= 2025 V-League Collegiate Challenge =

Fourth season of the V-League revival

- League: V-League
- Sport: Volleyball
- Duration: August 9 – October 10, 2025
- Matches: M: 36; W: 36
- Teams: M: 8; W: 8
- Season MVP: M Chris Hernandez (DLSU); W Shaina Nitura (Adamson)
- Finals champions: M FEU Tamaraws; W Adamson Lady Falcons
- Runners-up: M De La Salle Green Spikers; W FEU Lady Tamaraws
- Finals MVP: M Zhydryx Saavedra (FEU); W Shaina Nitura (Adamson)

V-League Collegiate Challenge seasons
- ← 2024 2026 →

The 2025 V-League Collegiate Challenge was the fourth season of the revival of the V-League of the Philippines. The tournament started on August 9, 2025, at the Ynares Sports Arena in Pasig, with both divisions having eight competing teams.

== Participating teams ==
Team	School	Collegiate league
Men's division
Arellano Chiefs	Arellano University	NCAA
Ateneo Blue Eagles	Ateneo de Manila University	UAAP
Benilde Blazers	De La Salle–College of Saint Benilde	NCAA
De La Salle Green Spikers	De La Salle University	UAAP
FEU Tamaraws	Far Eastern University	UAAP
Letran Knights	Colegio de San Juan de Letran	NCAA
NU Bulldogs	National University	UAAP
UST Golden Spikers	University of Santo Tomas	UAAP
Women's division
Adamson Lady Falcons	Adamson University	UAAP
Arellano Lady Chiefs	Arellano University	NCAA
Ateneo Blue Eagles	Ateneo de Manila University	UAAP
Benilde Lady Blazers	De La Salle–College of Saint Benilde	NCAA
FEU Lady Tamaraws	Far Eastern University	UAAP
Letran Lady Knights	Colegio de San Juan de Letran	NCAA
Mapúa Lady Cardinals	Mapúa University	NCAA
Perpetual Lady Altas	University of Perpetual Help System DALTA	NCAA

== Venues ==
Preliminaries		Preliminaries, Semifinals, Finals	Semifinals	Finals
Pasig	Manila	San Juan	Rodriguez, Rizal	Dasmariñas
Ynares Sports Arena (YSA)	Paco Arena (PAC)	Filoil Centre (FIL)	Ynares Center Montalban (YCM)	City of Dasmariñas Arena (COD)
Capacity: 3,000	Capacity: 1,000	Capacity: 6,000	Capacity: 8,000	Capacity: 5,000
			-	-

== Format ==
The following format is being conducted in both tournaments for the entirety of the season:

Preliminary round

- The preliminary round is a single round-robin tournament, with each team playing one match against all other teams for a total of seven matches. Teams are ranked using the FIVB Ranking System.
- The top four teams will advance to the semifinals.
- Teams ranked fifth through eighth will be eliminated and be ranked accordingly.

Semifinals

- The semifinals will be composed best-of-three series. The winners advance to the championship series while the losers play in the third-place match.
- The match-ups will be as follows:
  - SF1: QF1 winner vs. QF4 winner
  - SF2: QF2 winner vs. QF3 winner

Finals

- The championship (gold medal) will be a best-of-three series while the third-place match (bronze medal) will be a singular match.
- The match-ups will be as follows:
  - Championship match: Semifinal round winners
  - Third-place match: Semifinal round losers

== Pool standing procedure ==
- First, teams are ranked by the number of matches won.
- If the number of matches won is tied, the tied teams are then ranked by match points, wherein:
  - Match won 3–0 or 3–1: 3 match points for the winner, 0 match points for the loser.
  - Match won 3–2: 2 match points for the winner, 1 match point for the loser.
- In case of any further ties, the following criteria shall be used:
  - Set ratio: the number of sets won divided by number of sets lost.
  - Point ratio: number of points scored divided by number of points allowed.
  - Head-to-head standings: any remaining tied teams are ranked based on the results of head-to-head matches involving the teams in question.

== Squads ==
=== Men's line-up ===
Arellano Chiefs
No.	Player name	Position
1	AGOVIDA, Daniel Adonai	MB
2	GUINTO, Arman Clarence	OH
3	OSABEL, Ervin Patrick	OH
4	PANGILINAN, Jake	MB
5	SIMPAO, Matt Morgan	OP
6	NERI, Jhames Martin	S
7	DOMINGUITO, Cj	OH
8	DEFERIA, Keith Justine	L
9	SALVO, Laurence Andrei	S
10	PABLO, Kian	OP
11	CATERIA, Wainn Wojtyla	L
12	SINUTO, Jiwen (C)	OP
13	FRANCISCO, Jay Bryan	OH
14	CASTRO, Aaron Justine	L
15	CABRERA, Bryan Jay	OP
16	YATCO, Daniel Justin	S
18	CABUGAO, Keith Nicko	MB
19	BUGARIN, Jordan	MB
21	DOMINGO, Ralph	MB
22	GARCIA, Arvin	MB
	VITUG, Carl Bryan	Coach
	ANTIQUERA, Arvien	Assistant

Ateneo Blue Eagles
No.	Player name	Position
2	CRISOSTOMO, Leinuel	L
3	GUTIERREZ, Lorenzo Samuel	S
4	SALARZON, Jian Matthew (C)	OH
5	BATAS, Kennedy	OP
7	ALEJOS, Kristofer Rodge	MB
8	PACINIO, Amil Jr.	OH
9	REYES, Karl	OP
10	BAHIA, Gian Sebastian	S
11	TALUBAN, Ejira Kayelle	S
12	ATENDIDO, Le Preece	OH
14	YU, Julio Miguel	OP
16	ALMADRO, Andrei John	OH
17	SENDON, Jeric	MB
18	MEDINO, Jon Paolo	OH
19	QUIJANO, Christan David	L
21	BATAC, Tim Rodniel	OP
22	ARANETA, Sebastian	MB
23	CASTRO, Brian	MB
24	CORRIGEDOR, Karl Genellez	MB
25	DE CASTRO, Lance Andrei	L
	MANGULABNAN, Vince	Coach
	RIVERA, Tomie	Assistant

Benilde Blazers
No.	Player name	Position
1	BETCO, Reymark	OP
2	JORDAN, Paul	OH
3	ONDEVILLA, Kevin Jonathan	OP
4	GRANIADA, Dexter	OH
5	VILLANUEVA, Chris Lorenz	S
6	MACAGALING, Mark Lawrence	MB
7	MALICDEM, Nolram	OP
8	REOLALAS, Joseph Benedict	OP
9	MOTOL, Rocky Roy	OP
10	KARPAT, Emanuel Juan Antonio	MB
11	SULAYMAN, Alvin	OH
12	BALBACAL, Mike Adriane	MB
13	ROSALES, Mark Jun	OH
15	AGUILAR, Arnel Christian	OH
17	CUENCA, Jeremi Pierre	MB
18	AUSTERO, John Adrienel (C)	MB
19	RABANES, Al Bernard	S
21	BALDADO, Martin Daniel	MB
24	ESTRADA, John Vincent	MB
	LANIOG, Arnold	Coach
	ROQUE, Jose	Assistant

De La Salle Green Spikers
No.	Player name	Position
1	MENDOZA, Uriel	OH
3	FLORES, Robert	L
4	REGIDOR, Ezer Jake	S
6	RETIRO, Sherwin	L
7	LAYUG, Eric Paolo	MB
8	FLORES, Neil Laurence	L
9	MAGALLANES, Arjay	OH
11	GLORIA, Eugene	OH
12	FORTUNA, Michael John	S
13	OUSSEINI, Issa	MB
14	PEREZ, Hannz	OH
15	ABUT, Matthew Thomas	OH
16	NUNAG, Richard	S
17	RODRIGUEZ, Joshua Jamiel (C)	MB
18	HERNANDEZ, Chris Emmanuel	OH
20	VENTURA, Glen Rui	OP
21	BANGIT, Nathaniel	S
22	MAGALAMAN, Joshua	MB
	ROQUE, Jose	Coach
	VELEZ, Aaron	Assistant

FEU Tamaraws
No.	Player name	Position
1	CEBALLOS, Vennie Paul	L
2	BRIONES, Jake Jayson	L
3	CACAO, Ariel (C)	S
4	DE GUZMAN, Bryce	L
5	ESPARTERO, Mikko	OH
6	TANDOC, Kyle	OH
7	MARTINEZ, Juan Roc Austin	S
8	MARTINEZ, Benny	S
9	SAAVEDRA, Zhydryx	OP
10	RONQUILLO, Kalei Gabriel	S
11	MENDOZA, Lirick	MB
12	MIGUEL, Luis	OH
14	DU-OT, Rhodson	S
15	NDONGALA, Doula	MB
16	CABATAC, Carl Jonard	OP
18	SALBORO, Christian Paul	OH
19	BITUIN, Amet	OP
20	SANTOS, Jose Lorenzo	L
22	ABSIN, Charles	MB
24	GARRIEDO, Judi	OP
	ORCULLO, Eddieson	Coach
	DULAY, Rene	Assistant

Letran Knights
No.	Player name	Position
1	HIMZON, Vince Virrey	MB
2	VICENTE, Lorenz	OH
3	CUARTO, Edgin	L
4	ARAÑO, John Wayne (C)	S
5	CORDERO, Luke	L
6	BERMIDO, Felix	MB
7	GRATELA, Renier	MB
8	SUMAGAYSAY, John	S
9	ALECIDA, Kirby Vonn	L
10	CIRIACO, Nathan	OH
11	SANTIAGUDO, Jero	MB
12	BAUTISTA, John Derrick	OH
14	LARDIZABAL, Dave Thomas	MB
15	LOPEZ, Maximuz Paolo	OH
16	AMBROCIO, Christer Lou	OH
17	ABETO, Andrew	OH
18	BARBA, Arieh	OH
19	LUZARAN, John Nicholas	MB
21	MATIENZO, Beejay	MB
23	TOLENTINO, Joross Caesar	S
	ESQUIBEL, Brian	Coach
	MANALON, Ferdinand	Assistant

NU Bulldogs
No.	Player name	Position
2	ANCHETA, Greg Augustus Luis	S
3	GALLEGO, Jeffe	S
4	BANDOLA, Mac Arvin	OH
5	ABANILLA, Jan Llanfred	OP
6	BUDDIN, Michaelo	OH
7	EGGER, Herbert Miguel	MB
9	MENDOZA, Yuan	OH
10	MUKABA, Obed	MB
11	DISQUITADO, Jade Alex	OH
12	TAGUIBOLOS, Rwenzmel	MB
14	ORDIALES, Leo	OP
15	HERNANDEZ, Michael Jonas	L
16	PARREÑO, Kade	L
17	GAPULTOS, Jimwell	L
19	DOROMAL, Joelbert	OH
20	TION, Glenn Sirac	OH
21	BOLABOLA, Andrei	S
22	MACATANGAY, Luke Anton Carl	OH
23	DIAO, Jenngerard Arnfranz (C)	MB
24	QUINTO, Jayden	OP
	ALINSUNURIN, Dante Jr.	Coach
	DELA CRUZ, Ariel	Assistant

UST Golden Spikers
No.	Player name	Position
1	DE VEGA, Rey Miguel	OH
2	SALVADOR, Kenneth John	OH
3	YAMANAKA, Ryuichi Isaiah	MB
5	MACAM, Jan	OH
6	SALI, Al-Bukharie	OP
7	YAMBAO, Dux Euan (C)	S
9	AVILA, Joshua	S
10	LEGASPI, Kalei Gionne	L
12	ALABAR, Ed	L
13	YBANEZ, Josh	OH
14	VALERA, Trevor	MB
15	UMANDAL, Sherwin	OP
16	HERNANDEZ, Kris Gabriel	OP
17	COLINARES, Ennius Gwen	S
18	CATINSAG, John Vrybin	MB
19	DELICANA, Andrei	OH
20	CRUZ, Crisean	MB
21	MALABUNGA, Karbe	MB
22	DELA PAZ, Rain	MB
25	AYCO, Joncriz	OP
	MAMON, Odjie	Coach
	MAPE, Benjamin	Assistant

Legend
S	Setter
MB	Middle Blocker
OH	Outside Hitter
OP	Opposite Hitter
L	Libero
(C)	Team Captain

=== Women's line-up ===
Adamson Lady Falcons
No.	Player name	Position
1	NITURA, Shaina Marie (C)	OH
2	JAMILI, Jimy Jean	OH
3	TUDDAO, Lhouriz	MB
4	DOTE, Princess Eloisa	MB
5	DEL MORAL, Mary Ann Grace	MB
6	SOLIS, Leonah Monique	OP
7	CUENCA, Joachen Ghail	S
8	ROCHA, Kim Yra	OP
9	SAPIENZA, Maria Ysabella Francesca	S
10	DIONISIO, Kamille	MB
12	MANUEL, Juris Anne Clare	L
13	MORDI, Frances	OH
14	SAGAYSAY, Felicity Marie	S
16	BASCON, Red	S
17	ASEO, Mary Joy	OH
18	SEGUI, Abegail	OP
19	APOSAGA, Althea Jamine	L
20	DIVINAGRACIA, Frisha Angeline	MB
21	BARRERA, Lana Isabella	OH
23	GAM, Claire Jesselou	L
	YUDE, John Philip	Coach
	MARCO, Wayne Ferdie	Assistant

Arellano Lady Chiefs
No.	Player name	Position
1	ARELLANO, Kyra	MB
2	TIRATIRA, Samantha Gabrielle	MB
3	ANTANG, Ramyshane	OH
4	CAFE, Sheena	S
5	GELAGA, Jasmine	OP
6	PABLO, Khey Aleck	L
7	TUDLASAN, Laika	OH
8	CAGUICLA, Alona Nicole (C)	L
9	MAGALING, Mauie Joice	OH
10	PADILLON, Marianne Lei Angelique	OH
11	ABITRIA, Keisha Alexa	OH
12	CEBALLOS, Harem	L
13	MANGUBAT, Fhaye	MB
14	VILLAFLORES, Heart	OH
15	DOMASIG, Catherine	S
16	PUNZALAN, Kacelyn	MB
17	SEGOVIA, Desaela Gae	MB
18	SERVIDAD, Crisanta	OP
19	SANTIAGO, Leoranne Angela	MB
20	LACSINA, Ishy Keil	S
	JAVIER, Roberto	Coach
	ESTACIO, Richard	Assistant

Ateneo Blue Eagles
No.	Player name	Position
1	HORA, Gena May	OP
2	TAN-CHI, Alana Grace	OH
3	NJIGHA, Chusel	OP
4	SILOS, Maria Kristien Dawn	OP
5	CORTEZ, Katherine Shaine	S
6	PACIA, Zey Mitizi	OP
8	MONTORO, Alexia Marie	L
9	FUJIMOTO, Takako (C)	S
12	CHUATICO, Jihan Isabelle	MB
13	SILLA, Ma. Robielle Angela	MB
14	HERMOSURA, Ana	OH
15	GULAPA, Michaila	MB
16	DE LEON, Dona Mae	MB
17	SELGA, Rosal Anthea	MB
18	LOMOSCO, Beutaliza	S
19	ARROYO, Fiona Marie	L
20	QUIMPO, Christen Mikaela	L
21	MATIBAG, Grydelle Joanice	OP
22	DE CHAVEZ, Stephanie	L
24	NISPEROS, Faye Sophia Ysabelle	OH
25	MINDANAO, Juliene Daiz	MB
	VELOSO, Sergio	Coach
	BAGATSING, Ramona	Assistant

Benilde Lady Blazers
No.	Player name	Position
1	BASARTE, Chenae	S
2	BARTOLOME, Camila Amor	OH
3	LIMPOT, Alyzandrianne	L
4	ESTENZO Kim Alison	L
5	GETIGAN, Fiona Naomi	L
6	BASILIO, Zen Reina	S
7	FLORES, Francis Mae	OH
8	DELGADO, Francheska Faye	S
9	DENSING, Rhea Mae	OP
10	BADION, Sophia Margarette	MB
11	LLESES, Shekaina Rhedge	OH
12	LLESES, Shahanna Rheign	OH
14	ROJO, Yesha Keith	OP
15	INOCENTES, Fiona Marie	MB
16	CATARIG, Clydel Mae	OP
17	DOROG, Jessa (C)	L
18	ONDANGAN, Cristy	MB
20	PUA, Arianna Raven	OH
21	NOLASCO, Zamantha	MB
23	CASTILLO, Angela Claire	OH
24	ALMONIA, Angel Mae	OH
	YEE, Jerry	Coach
	GETIGAN, Rogelio Jr.	Assistant

FEU Lady Tamaraws
No.	Player name	Position
1	BAKANKE, Faida	OP
2	PONS, Melody	OH
4	PENDON, Kyle	OP
5	UBALDO, Christine (C)	S
6	LOPEZ, Lovely Rose	OH
7	ASIS, Ann Roselle	MB
8	PANANGIN, Mitzi	MB
9	ARCIAGA, Patricia Leanne Jan	MB
10	LORESCO, Clarisse	MB
11	MIRANDA, Karyll	S
12	PREMAYLON, Frenchie	OP
13	DEVOSORA, Alyssa	OH
14	SUPLICO, Mary Karylle	L
15	PETALLO, Gerzel Mary	OH
16	RAMOS, Christine Dominique	S
17	ENCARNACION, Margarett Louise	L
18	ESCOTE, Mhyne Venizze	MB
19	SANTOS, Audrey Izscha	MB
20	DUROLA, Dreianne	OH
21	ELLARINA, Jazlyn Anne	MB
24	DAVID, Ia Madane	OH
	SALAK, Tina	Coach
	REFUGIA, Manolo	Assistant

Letran Lady Knights
No.	Player name	Position
1	NITURA, Marie Judiel	OP
3	ZAMUDIO, Angela Ann Louise	L
4	NAPAL, Marjorie	MB
5	ALMIRANTE, Keiara	OP
6	PADILLA, Leonilyn	MB
7	MARTIN, Nizelle Aeriyen	OH
8	TUMAYAO, Princess Zyne	S
9	PANANGIN, Joralyn	OH
10	ESTRELLER, Natalie Marie	S
12	COLENDRA, Verenicce	OP
13	ENRIQUEZ, Roanne Jane	MB
14	ENVERGA, Marbey Allen	L
15	SARIE, Sheena Vanessa	OH
16	ISAR, Lastlie Jade	MB
17	FLORES, Hizki	S
18	BRAGO, Edcynth Pearl	OP
19	SILVA, Lara Mae (C)	L
21	MAQUILANG, Jogi	OP
23	ABITRIA, Ma. Blesila Angelei	OH
25	MAQUILANG, Gia Marcel	OH
	LAHTEENMAKI, Aleksi	Coach
	CAROLINO, Marietta	Assistant

Mapúa Lady Cardinals
No.	Player name	Position
1	CABADIN, Gregchelle	OP
2	RICABLANCA, Raissa Janel	OP
3	MANALO, Therese Angeli	MB
4	GARCIA, Freighanne Seanelle	OH
5	MARCOS, Clarence	MB
6	REBUSTES, Princess	L
7	GAVICA, Angellick Gem	S
8	YAP, Laurene Alexis	MB
9	YABUT, Diandrah	MB
10	MANARANG, Princess Jeline	S
11	ONG, Alyanna Nicole (C)	MB
12	TAMBASACAN, Ma. Theresa	OH
13	ESTUDILLO, Juliana Marie	OH
14	ESTEBAN, Franchesca Clariss	OP
15	LEABRES, Alexander	OP
17	MORALES, Zyra Danica	OP
18	DE GUZMAN, Hannah	OP
19	GACULA, Freebie Alejandra	L
20	VILLAGERA, Divine Shane	L
22	CAYANAN, Svetlana Crystal Joan	OH
23	SISTADO, Zairylle Jade	OH
	ESTEBAN, Clarence	Coach
	CRUZ, Lorence	Assistant

Perpetual Lady Altas
No.	Player name	Position
1	LOZANO, Joanna Denise	L
2	ENRICO, Charisse Mae (C)	MB
3	FRANCIA, Kristine Reyn	OH
4	OMIPON, Shaila Allaine	OH
5	REYES, Pauline Mae	OP
6	VILLANUEVA, Liz Alexie	OH
7	ALMENIANA, Cyrielle Joie	OH
8	LAGMAY, Jazhryll Loraine	MB
9	PALACIO, Geraldine Rae	MB
10	MARIANO, Monica Louise	OP
11	BUSTAMANTE, Camille	OH
12	ARIOLA, Fianne Istle	S
14	UY, Daizerlyn Joice	MB
15	MENOR, Jernalyn	OH
16	ATLAS, Chelzea Mae	OP
17	GAA, Nicole Jhane	S
18	GAA, Nicollete Anne	S
19	VALDEZ, Edel Mae	OH
20	GECOBE, Desiree	L
21	CAPARROS, Leigh Sheridane	L
	RIETA, Sandy	Coach
		Assistant

== Men's tournament ==
- All times are Philippine Standard Time (UTC+8:00).

=== Preliminary round ===
==== Standings ====
Pos	Team	Pld	W	L	Pts	SW	SL	SR	SPW	SPL	SPR	Qualification
1	De La Salle Green Spikers	7	7	0	19	21	7	3.000	666	495	1.345	Semifinals
2	UST Golden Spikers	7	5	2	17	19	8	2.375	636	656	0.970	Semifinals
3	FEU Tamaraws	7	4	3	14	17	11	1.545	643	605	1.063	Semifinals
4	Ateneo Blue Eagles	7	4	3	12	14	11	1.273	573	568	1.009	Semifinals
5	NU Bulldogs	7	3	4	8	12	17	0.706	623	658	0.947	
6	Benilde Blazers	7	3	4	7	12	17	0.706	652	699	0.933	
7	Letran Knights	7	2	5	6	9	16	0.563	550	565	0.973	
8	Arellano Chiefs	7	0	7	1	4	21	0.190	504	609	0.828	

Source: V-League

==== Match results ====
Date	Time	Venue		Score		Set 1	Set 2	Set 3	Set 4	Set 5	Total	Report
Aug 09	10:00	YSA	NU Bulldogs	3–2	Arellano Chiefs	25–18	23–25	25–20	21–25	15–9	109–97	P2
Aug 09	12:00	YSA	UST Golden Spikers	3–0	Ateneo Blue Eagles	25–19	25–17	25–19			75–55	P2
Aug 10	15:00	PAC	Arellano Chiefs	0–3	De La Salle Green Spikers	20–25	23–25	21–25			64–75	P2
Aug 10	17:00	PAC	Letran Knights	0–3	Ateneo Blue Eagles	17–25	23–25	21–25			61–75	P2
Aug 12	10:00	PAC	Letran Knights	1–3	UST Golden Spikers	25–20	17–25	18–25	21–25		81–95	P2
Aug 12	12:00	PAC	De La Salle Green Spikers	3–0	NU Bulldogs	25–17	25–15	33–31			83–63	P2
Aug 16	15:00	PAC	UST Golden Spikers	3–0	Benilde Blazers	25–21	25–21	30–28			80–70	P2
Aug 16	17:00	PAC	NU Bulldogs	1–3	Ateneo Blue Eagles	18–25	23–25	28–26	21–25		90–101	P2
Aug 17	10:00	PAC	Arellano Chiefs	0–3	Letran Knights	17–25	20–25	17–25			54–75	P2
Aug 17	12:00	PAC	Benilde Blazers	1–3	De La Salle Green Spikers	21–25	29–27	29–31	21–25		100–108	P2
Aug 19	15:00	PAC	Ateneo Blue Eagles	1–3	FEU Tamaraws	20–25	25–22	19–25	22–25		86–97	P2
Aug 19	17:00	PAC	UST Golden Spikers	2–3	NU Bulldogs	19–25	24–26	25–16	25–14	17–19	110–100	P2
Aug 23	10:00	PAC	FEU Tamaraws	3–1	Arellano Chiefs	25–17	22–25	25–23	25–20		97–85	P2
Aug 23	12:00	PAC	De La Salle Green Spikers	3–1	Letran Knights	25–16	25–22	22–25	25–20		97–83	P2
Aug 24	15:00	PAC	Benilde Blazers	1–3	Ateneo Blue Eagles	20–25	25–23	24–26	15–25		84–99	P2
Aug 24	17:00	PAC	NU Bulldogs	0–3	FEU Tamaraws	21–25	20–25	23–25			64–75	P2
Aug 30	15:00	PAC	Arellano Chiefs	1–3	Benilde Blazers	25–22	14–25	28–30	22–25		89–102	P2
Aug 30	17:00	PAC	De La Salle Green Spikers	3–2	FEU Tamaraws	29–27	25–14	12–25	21–25	15–13	102–104	P2
Sep 03	15:00	PAC	Benilde Blazers	1–3	Letran Knights	25–23	15–25	19–25	23–25		82–98	P2
Sep 03	17:00	PAC	UST Golden Spikers	3–0	Arellano Chiefs	25–18	25–18	25–15			75–51	P2
Sep 06	10:00	PAC	FEU Tamaraws	1–3	UST Golden Spikers	25–19	23–25	15–25	17–25		80–94	P2
Sep 06	12:00	PAC	Ateneo Blue Eagles	1–3	De La Salle Green Spikers	22–25	25–22	17–25	17–25		81–97	P2
Sep 07	15:00	PAC	Arellano Chiefs	0–3	Ateneo Blue Eagles	24–26	18–25	22–25			64–76	P2
Sep 07	17:00	PAC	Benilde Blazers	3–2	FEU Tamaraws	31–29	25–21	17–25	19–25	17–15	109–115	P2
Sep 10	10:00	PAC	FEU Tamaraws	3–0	Letran Knights	25–23	25–22	25–20			75–65	P2
Sep 10	12:00	PAC	NU Bulldogs	2–3	Benilde Blazers	22–25	22–25	29–25	25–15	12–15	110–105	P2
Sep 29	15:00	FIL	Letran Knights	1–3	NU Bulldogs	25–12	19–25	20–25	23–25		87–87	P2
Sep 29	17:00	FIL	UST Golden Spikers	2–3	De La Salle Green Spikers	25–23	21–25	23–25	26–24	12–15	107–112	P2

=== Final round ===
- All times are Philippine Standard Time (UTC+8:00).
- Battle for bronze is a knockout match.
- Championship is a best-of-three series.

Semifinals
1	De La Salle Green Spikers	3	1	3
4	Ateneo Blue Eagles	1	3	1
2	UST Golden Spikers	2	3	0
3	FEU Tamaraws	3	1	3

Championship
De La Salle Green Spikers	3	0	0
FEU Tamaraws	0	3	3
Third place
Ateneo Blue Eagles	0
UST Golden Spikers	3

==== Semifinals ====
Rank 1 vs Rank 4

Date	Time	Venue		Score		Set 1	Set 2	Set 3	Set 4	Set 5	Total	Report
Oct 01	10:00	FIL	De La Salle Green Spikers	3–1	Ateneo Blue Eagles	26–24	22–25	25–13	25–18		98–80	P2
Oct 02	12:00	FIL	Ateneo Blue Eagles	3–1	De La Salle Green Spikers	28–26	25–16	23–25	26–24		102–91	P2
Oct 04	14:00	YCM	De La Salle Green Spikers	3–1	Ateneo Blue Eagles	22–25	25–22	25–19	25–16		97–82	P2

Rank 2 vs Rank 3

Date	Time	Venue		Score		Set 1	Set 2	Set 3	Set 4	Set 5	Total	Report
Oct 01	12:00	FIL	UST Golden Spikers	2–3	FEU Tamaraws	23–25	25–16	19–25	26–24	8–15	101–105	P2
Oct 02	10:00	FIL	FEU Tamaraws	1–3	UST Golden Spikers	21–25	21–25	25–23	23–25		90–98	P2
Oct 04	16:00	YCM	UST Golden Spikers	0–3	FEU Tamaraws	23–25	27–29	19–25			69–79	P2

==== 3rd place match ====
Date	Time	Venue		Score		Set 1	Set 2	Set 3	Set 4	Set 5	Total	Report
Oct 06	10:00	FIL	Ateneo Blue Eagles	0–3	UST Golden Spikers	21–25	19–25	17–25			57–75	P2

==== Championship ====
Date	Time	Venue		Score		Set 1	Set 2	Set 3	Set 4	Set 5	Total	Report
Oct 06	17:00	FIL	De La Salle Green Spikers	3–0	FEU Tamaraws	25–18	25–22	25–23			75–63	P2
Oct 08	16:00	COD	FEU Tamaraws	3–0	De La Salle Green Spikers	25–16	25–17	25–18			75–51	P2
Oct 10	14:00	FIL	De La Salle Green Spikers	0–3	FEU Tamaraws	15–25	22–25	23–25			60–75	P2

2025 V-League Collegiate Challenge Men's Champions
FEU Tamaraws
2nd title

== Women's tournament ==
- All times are Philippine Standard Time (UTC+8:00).

=== Preliminary round ===
==== Standings ====
Pos	Team	Pld	W	L	Pts	SW	SL	SR	SPW	SPL	SPR	Qualification
1	Adamson Lady Falcons	7	7	0	20	21	3	7.000	576	448	1.286	Semifinals
2	FEU Lady Tamaraws	7	6	1	17	20	10	2.000	669	583	1.148	Semifinals
3	Benilde Lady Blazers	7	5	2	15	17	10	1.700	611	523	1.168	Semifinals
4	Arellano Lady Chiefs	7	3	4	8	13	17	0.765	619	662	0.935	Semifinals
5	Letran Lady Knights	7	3	4	7	12	16	0.750	554	609	0.910	
6	Perpetual Lady Altas	7	2	5	8	12	15	0.800	537	562	0.956	
7	Mapúa Lady Cardinals	7	1	6	5	7	19	0.368	511	606	0.843	
8	Ateneo Blue Eagles	7	1	6	4	7	18	0.389	515	619	0.832	

Source: V-League

==== Match results ====
Date	Time	Venue		Score		Set 1	Set 2	Set 3	Set 4	Set 5	Total	Report
Aug 09	15:00	YSA	Arellano Lady Chiefs	3–2	Mapúa Lady Cardinals	20–25	15–25	26–24	25–23	15–13	101–110	P2
Aug 09	17:00	YSA	Benilde Lady Blazers	3–0	Perpetual Lady Altas	25–19	25–13	25–18			75–50	P2
Aug 10	10:00	PAC	Mapúa Lady Cardinals	0–3	FEU Lady Tamaraws	15–25	22–25	21–25			58–75	P2
Aug 10	12:00	PAC	Perpetual Lady Altas	1–3	Adamson Lady Falcons	25–22	15–25	16–25	22–25		78–97	P2
Aug 12	15:00	PAC	Letran Lady Knights	1–3	Benilde Lady Blazers	15–25	15–25	25–20	20–25		75–95	P2
Aug 12	17:00	PAC	Adamson Lady Falcons	3–2	FEU Lady Tamaraws	25–22	25–21	17–25	22–25	15–11	104–104	P2
Aug 16	10:00	PAC	Mapúa Lady Cardinals	0–3	Perpetual Lady Altas	13–25	9–25	13–25			35–75	P2
Aug 16	12:00	PAC	Ateneo Blue Eagles	0–3	Benilde Lady Blazers	18–25	18–25	17–25			53–75	P2
Aug 19	10:00	PAC	FEU Lady Tamaraws	3–1	Letran Lady Knights	25–21	25–18	20–25	25–20		95–84	P2
Aug 19	12:00	PAC	Benilde Lady Blazers	0–3	Adamson Lady Falcons	22–25	13–25	20–25			55–75	P2
Aug 23	15:00	PAC	Perpetual Lady Altas	2–3	Letran Lady Knights	16–25	15–25	25–20	25–21		81–91	P2
Aug 23	17:00	PAC	Arellano Lady Chiefs	2–3	FEU Lady Tamaraws	25–23	26–24	9–25	22–25	12–15	94–112	P2
Aug 24	10:00	PAC	Letran Lady Knights	3–0	Mapúa Lady Cardinals	25–19	25–23	25–18			75–60	P2
Aug 24	12:00	PAC	FEU Lady Tamaraws	3–2	Benilde Lady Blazers	25–22	25–21	23–25	24–26	15–8	112–102	P2
Aug 30	10:00	PAC	Adamson Lady Falcons	3–0	Arellano Lady Chiefs	25–18	25–21	25–22			75–61	P2
Aug 30	12:00	PAC	Ateneo Blue Eagles	1–3	Mapúa Lady Cardinals	21–25	22–25	25–23	24–26		92–99	P2
Aug 31	10:00	PAC	Mapúa Lady Cardinals	0–3	Adamson Lady Falcons	15–25	23–25	11–25			49–75	P2
Aug 31	12:00	PAC	Perpetual Lady Altas	3–0	Ateneo Blue Eagles	25–16	30–28	25–19			80–63	P2
Sep 03	10:00	PAC	Ateneo Blue Eagles	3–1	Arellano Lady Chiefs	25–13	9–25	25–21	25–20		84–79	P2
Sep 03	12:00	PAC	Adamson Lady Falcons	3–0	Letran Lady Knights	25–18	25–17	25–16			75–51	P2
Sep 06	15:00	PAC	Letran Lady Knights	3–2	Ateneo Blue Eagles	25–21	25–17	23–25	23–25	18–16	114–104	P2
Sep 06	17:00	PAC	Perpetual Lady Altas	2–3	Arellano Lady Chiefs	25–20	19–25	23–25	25–22	9–15	101–107	P2
Sep 07	10:00	PAC	Arellano Lady Chiefs	3–1	Letran Lady Knights	25–13	23–25	25–22	26–24		99–84	P2
Sep 07	12:00	PAC	Ateneo Blue Eagles	0–3	Adamson Lady Falcons	22–25	17–25	11–25			50–75	P2
Sep 10	15:00	PAC	Mapúa Lady Cardinals	2–3	Benilde Lady Blazers	18–25	17–25	27–25	25–23	13–15	100–113	P2
Sep 10	17:00	PAC	FEU Lady Tamaraws	3–1	Ateneo Blue Eagles	22–25	25–12	25–17	25–15		97–69	P2
Sep 29	10:00	FIL	Benilde Lady Blazers	3–1	Arellano Lady Chiefs	25–15	21–25	25–22	25–16		96–78	P2
Sep 29	12:00	FIL	Perpetual Lady Altas	1–3	FEU Lady Tamaraws	18–25	25–19	18–25	11–25		72–94	P2

=== Final round ===
- All times are Philippine Standard Time (UTC+8:00).
- Battle for bronze is a knockout match.
- Championship is a best-of-three series.

Semifinals
1	Adamson Lady Falcons	3	3
4	Arellano Lady Chiefs	0	1
2	FEU Lady Tamaraws	3	3
3	Benilde Lady Blazers	1	0

Championship
Adamson Lady Falcons	3	1	3
FEU Lady Tamaraws	1	3	0
Third place
Arellano Lady Chiefs	2
Benilde Lady Blazers	3

==== Semifinals ====
Rank 1 vs Rank 4

Date	Time	Venue		Score		Set 1	Set 2	Set 3	Set 4	Set 5	Total	Report
Oct 01	10:00	FIL	Adamson Lady Falcons	3–0	Arellano Lady Chiefs	25–23	25–19	25–16			75–58	P2
Oct 02	10:00	FIL	Arellano Lady Chiefs	1–3	Adamson Lady Falcons	25–22	11–25	13–25	20–25		69–97	P2

Rank 2 vs Rank 3

Date	Time	Venue		Score		Set 1	Set 2	Set 3	Set 4	Set 5	Total	Report
Oct 01	17:00	FIL	FEU Lady Tamaraws	3–1	Benilde Lady Blazers	25–20	20–25	25–18	25–23		95–86	P2
Oct 02	17:00	FIL	Benilde Lady Blazers	0–3	FEU Lady Tamaraws	14–25	20–25	18–25			52–75	P2

==== 3rd place match ====
Date	Time	Venue		Score		Set 1	Set 2	Set 3	Set 4	Set 5	Total	Report
Oct 06	12:00	FIL	Arellano Lady Chiefs	2–3	Benilde Lady Blazers	25–21	25–16	22–25	15–25	4–15	91–102	P2

==== Championship ====
Date	Time	Venue		Score		Set 1	Set 2	Set 3	Set 4	Set 5	Total	Report
Oct 06	15:00	FIL	Adamson Lady Falcons	3–1	FEU Lady Tamaraws	25–18	26–24	23–25	25–23		99–90	P2
Oct 08	14:00	COD	FEU Lady Tamaraws	3–1	Adamson Lady Falcons	25–13	25–22	15–25	25–23		90–83	P2
Oct 10	16:00	FIL	Adamson Lady Falcons	3–0	FEU Lady Tamaraws	25–19	25–19	25–14			75–52	P2

2025 V-League Collegiate Challenge Women's Champions
Adamson Lady Falcons
1st title

== Awards and medalists ==
=== Individual awards ===
Award	Men's	Women's	Ref.
Conference Most Valuable Player	Chris Hernandez (DLSU)	Shaina Nitura (Adamson)	
Finals Most Valuable Player	Zhydryx Saavedra (FEU)	Shaina Nitura (Adamson)	
Best Setter	Dux Yambao (UST)	Felicity Sagaysay (Adamson)	
1st Best Outside Spiker	Chris Hernandez (DLSU)	Shaina Nitura (Adamson)	
2nd Best Outside Spiker	Rey Miguel De Vega (UST)	Gerzel Petallo (FEU)	
1st Best Middle Blocker	Issa Ousseimi (DLSU)	Zamantha Nolasco (Benilde)	
2nd Best Middle Blocker	Lirick Mendoza (FEU)	Jazlyn Ellarina (FEU)	
Best Opposite Spiker	Amil Pacinio Jr. (Ateneo)	Abegail Segui (Adamson)	
Best Libero	Sherwin Retiro (DLSU)	Harem Ceballos (Arellano)	

=== Medalists ===
Division	Gold	Silver	Bronze
Men's	FEU Tamaraws: Ariel Cacao (c); Vennie Paul Ceballos; Jake Jayson Briones; Bryce De Guzman; Mikko Espartero; Kyle Tandoc; Juan Roc Austin Martinez; Benny Martinez; Zhydryx Saavedra; Kalei Gabriel Ronquillo; Lirick Mendoza; Luis Miguel; Rhodson Du-ot; Doula Ndongala; Carl Jonard Cabatac; Christian Paul Salboro; Amet Bituin; Jose Lorenzo Santos; Charles Absin; Judi Garriedo Head Coach: Eddieson Orcullo	De La Salle Green Spikers: Joshua Jamiel Rodriguez (c); Uriel Mendoza; Robert Flores; Ezer Jake Regidor; Sherwin Retiro; Eric Paolo Layug; Neil Laurence Flores; Arjay Magalles; Eugene Gloria; Michael John Fortuna; Issa Ousseini; Hanz Perez; Matthew Thomas Abut; Richard Nunag; Chris Emmanuel Hernandez; Glen Rui Ventura; Nathaniel Bangit; Joshua Magalaman Head Coach: Jose Roque	UST Golden Spikers: Dux Euan Yambao (c); Rey Miguel De Vega; Kenneth John Salvador; Ryuichi Isaiah Yamanaka; Jan Macam; Al-Bukharie Sali; Joshua Avila; Kalei Gionne Legaspi; Ed Alabar; Josh Ybañez; Trevor Valera; Sherwin Umandal; Kris Gabriel Hernandez; Ennius Gwen Colinares; John Vrybin Catinsag; Andrei Delicana; Crisean Cruz; Karbe Malabunga; Rain Dela Paz; Joncriz Ayco Head Coach: Arthur Mamon
Women's	Adamson Lady Falcons: Shaina Nitura (c); Jimy Jean Jamili; Lhouriz Tuddao; Princess Eloisa Dote; Mary Ann Grace Del Moral; Leonah Monique Solis; Joachen Ghail Cuenca; Kim Yra Rocha; Ma. Ysabella Francesca Sapienza; Kamille Dionisio; Juris Anne Clare Manuel; Frances Mordi; Felicity Marie Sagaysay; Red Bascon; Mary Joy Aseo; Abegail Segui; Althea Jamine Aposaga; Frisha Angeline Divinagracia; Lana Isabella Barrera; Claire Jesselou Gam Head Coach: JP Yude	FEU Lady Tamaraws: Christine Ubaldo (c); Faida Bakanke; Melody Pons; Kyle Pendon; Lovely Rose Lopez; Ann Roselle Asis; Mitzi Panangin; Patricia Leanne Jan Arciaga; Clarisse Loresco; Karyll Miranda; Frenchie Premaylon; Alyssa Devosora; Mary Karylle Suplico; Gerzel Mary Petallo; Christine Dominique Ramos; Margarett Louise Encarnacion; Mhyne Venizze Escote; Audrey Izscha Santos; Dreianne Durola; Jazlyn Anne Ellarina; Ia Madane David Head Coach: Tina Salak	Benilde Lady Blazers: Jessa Dorog (c); Chenae Basarte; Camila Amor Bartolome; Alyzandrianne Limpot; Kim Alison Estenzo; Fiona Naomi Getigan; Zen Reina Basilio; Francis Mae Flores; Francheska Faye Delgado; Rhea Mae Densing; Sophia Margarette Badion; Shekaina Rhedge Lleses; Shahanna Rheign Lleses; Yesha Keith Rojo; Fiona Marie Inocentes; Clydel Mae Catarig; Cristy Ondangan; Arianna Raven Pua; Zamantha Nolasco; Angela Claire Castillo; Angel Mae Almonia Head Coach: Jerry Yee

== Final standings ==
Rank	Men's	Women's
1st place, gold medalist(s)	FEU Tamaraws	Adamson Lady Falcons
2nd place, silver medalist(s)	De La Salle Green Spikers	FEU Lady Tamaraws
3rd place, bronze medalist(s)	UST Golden Spikers	Benilde Lady Blazers
4	Ateneo Blue Eagles	Arellano Lady Chiefs
5	NU Bulldogs	Letran Lady Knights
6	Benilde Blazers	Perpetual Lady Altas
7	Letran Knights	Mapúa Lady Cardinals
8	Arellano Chiefs	Ateneo Blue Eagles

Qualified for the 2025 Spikers' Turf Invitational Conference
Wild card for the 2025 Spikers' Turf Invitational Conference

The top two teams in the men's division qualifies for the 2025 Spikers' Turf Invitational Conference. However De La Salle withdrew due to "academic commitments". Third-placers UST replaced the team.

== See also ==
- 2025 V-League Visayas season
