= V-League (Philippines) =

Collegiate volleyball league in the Philippines

- Current season, competition or edition: 2026 V-League Collegiate Challenge
- Sport: Volleyball
- Founded: 2022
- Founder: Sports Vision
- Motto: Where it all started!
- No. of teams: M: 8 W: 8
- Country: Philippines
- Venues: Playtime Filoil Centre; Ynares Sports Arena; Paco Arena
- Continent: AVC (Asia)
- Most recent champions: M: NU; W: Adamson
- Most titles: M: FEU & NU (2 titles each); W: Adamson (2 titles)
- Broadcaster: Solar Sports
- Streaming partner: V-League
- Website: vleague.ph

The V-League is a collegiate volleyball league for both men and women in the Philippines organized by Sports Vision. The league is a revival of the former Shakey's V-League. The Metro Manila tournament is also known as the V-League Collegiate Challenge.

The league was established in 2022 as a result of the Premier Volleyball League turning into a professional league, which meant that collegiate women's teams can no longer take part. Thus, the V-League was relaunched to accommodate those teams. Collegiate men's teams from Spikers' Turf also moved to the revived league.

On June 28, 2025, Sports Vision established V-League Visayas, a regional counterpart for Visayas-based teams.

== History ==
=== Precursor league ===
The V-League launched in 2022 traces its roots to the Shakey's V-League established in 2004 by Sports Vision Management Group, Inc. The Shakey's V-League was initially an inter-collegiate women's league with teams from the UAAP, NCAA, CESAFI among others playing in the league. The league had Shakey's Pizza as its title sponsor since its inception until 2016. The league would include corporate and non-collegiate teams in 2011.

In 2014, a men's division was introduced during its 21st conference. The following year, the men's tournament was spun-off as Spikers' Turf.

In late-2016, Sports Vision announced that the Spikers' Turf would be merged back with the Shakey's V-League (which was renamed as the Premier Volleyball League). The men's division in the PVL ended with the 2018 PVL Collegiate Conference as its final tournament. The Spikers' Turf was revived on October 6, 2018 and was reestablished as a separate legal entity from the PVL.

=== Launch and inaugural season ===
The PVL became a professional league starting the 2021 season which meant collegiate and amateur teams can no longer take part. Hence in October 2022, Sports Vision relaunched the collegiate conferences of the PVL and Spikers' Turf as a separate league – the V-League. Twelve teams are set to compete in the men's division and eight teams in the women's tournament.

=== Visayas expansion ===
On March 21, 2025, V-League Visayas was first announced as a regional counterpart for Visayas-based teams. Its inaugural season is set to begin in July of that year.

== Teams ==
These are the teams who will compete at the 2026 V-League Collegiate Challenge.

2026 V-League Collegiate Challenge
Team	School	Collegiate league
Men's division
Arellano Chiefs	Arellano University	NCAA
Benilde Blazers	De La Salle–College of Saint Benilde	NCAA
De La Salle Green Spikers	De La Salle University	UAAP
FEU Tamaraws	Far Eastern University	UAAP
Letran Knights	Colegio de San Juan de Letran	NCAA
Mapúa Cardinals	Mapúa University	NCAA
NU Bulldogs	National University	UAAP
UST Golden Spikers	University of Santo Tomas	UAAP
Women's division
Adamson Lady Falcons	Adamson University	UAAP
Arellano Lady Chiefs	Arellano University	NCAA
Benilde Lady Blazers	De La Salle–College of Saint Benilde	NCAA
Letran Lady Knights	Colegio de San Juan de Letran	NCAA
Perpetual Lady Altas	University of Perpetual Help System DALTA	NCAA
San Beda Lady Red Spikers	San Beda University	NCAA
UE Lady Red Warriors	University of the East	UAAP
UST Golden Tigresses	University of Santo Tomas	UAAP

== Result summary ==
Season	Men's division			Women's division		
Season	Champions	Runners-up	Third place	Champions	Runners-up	Third place
2022	NU Bulldogs	UST Golden Spikers	Perpetual Altas	Ateneo Blue Eagles	Adamson Lady Falcons	Benilde Lady Blazers
2023	De La Salle Green Spikers	UST Golden Spikers	FEU Tamaraws	Benilde Lady Blazers	FEU Lady Tamaraws	UE Lady Red Warriors
2024	FEU Tamaraws	De La Salle Green Spikers	NU Bulldogs	UST Golden Tigresses	FEU Lady Tamaraws	UE Lady Red Warriors
2025	FEU Tamaraws	De La Salle Green Spikers	UST Golden Spikers	Adamson Lady Falcons	FEU Lady Tamaraws	Benilde Lady Blazers
2026	NU Bulldogs	FEU Tamaraws	Letran Knights	Adamson Lady Falcons	UST Golden Tigresses	UE Lady Red Warriors

== Participating schools ==
Key
1st	Indicates a team finished as the champions during the conference
2nd	Indicates a team finished as the runners-up during the conference
3rd	Indicates a team finished as the third placer during the conference
4th	Indicates a team finished as the fourth placer during the conference
•	Indicates a team did not participate during the conference
WD	Indicates a team initially participated during the conference but later withdrew

=== Men's division ===
Team	2022	2023	2024	2025	2026
Adamson Soaring Falcons	10th	•	•	•	•
Ateneo Blue Eagles	4th	4th	7th	4th	•
Arellano Chiefs	8th	•	•	8th	6th
Benilde Blazers	11th	•	•	6th	4th
De La Salle Green Spikers	7th	1st	2nd	2nd	7th
EAC Generals	•	7th	8th	•	•
FEU Tamaraws	6th	3rd	1st	1st	2nd
Letran Knights	•	•	6th	7th	3rd
Mapúa Cardinals	•	•	•	•	8th
NU Bulldogs	1st	5th	3rd	5th	1st
Perpetual Altas	3rd	6th	5th	•	•
San Beda Red Spikers	5th	8th	•	•	•
San Sebastian Stags	12th	•	•	•	•
UP Fighting Maroons	9th	•	•	•	•
UST Golden Spikers	2nd	2nd	4th	3rd	5th

=== Women's division ===
Team	2022	2023	2024	2025	2026
Adamson Lady Falcons	2nd	•	•	1st	1st
Arellano Lady Chiefs	•	•	•	4th	4th
Ateneo Blue Eagles	1st	•	•	8th	•
Benilde Lady Blazers	3rd	1st	4th	3rd	7th
Enderun Lady Titans	•	5th	•	•	•
FEU Lady Tamaraws	5th	2nd	2nd	2nd	•
Letran Lady Knights	•	•	6th	5th	8th
Lyceum Lady Pirates	•	6th	7th	•	•
Mapúa Lady Cardinals	•	7th	•	7th	•
NU Lady Bulldogs	•	•	WD	•	•
Perpetual Lady Altas	•	4th	•	6th	5th
San Beda Lady Red Spikers	8th	•	•	•	6th
San Sebastian Lady Stags	7th	8th	•	•	•
UE Lady Warriors	•	3rd	3rd	•	3rd
UP Lady Maroons	4th	•	5th	•	•
UST Golden Tigresses	6th	•	1st	•	2nd

== Conference MVP by edition ==
=== Men ===
- 2022 – Nico Almendras (NU)
- 2023 – Joshua Ybañez (UST)
- 2024 – Rey Miguel De Vega (UST)
- 2025 – Chris Hernandez (DLSU)
- 2026 – Zhydryx Saavedra (FEU)

=== Women ===
- 2022 – Faith Nisperos (Ateneo)
- 2023 – Mary Rhose Dapol (Perpetual)
- 2024 – Angeline Poyos (UST)
- 2025 – Shaina Nitura (Adamson)
- 2026 – Frances Mordi (Adamson)

== Media coverage ==
The V-League games are streamed live on their official website and Facebook page and on-air thru television via CNN Philippines (2022) & Solar Sports (since 2023).

== See also ==
- V-League Visayas
- Shakey's Super League
- Spikers' Turf
- Premier Volleyball League
- NCAA volleyball championships (Philippines)
- UAAP volleyball championships
