= De La Salle Green Spikers volleyball =

Men's volleyball team of De La Salle University

De La Salle Green Spikers
- University: De La Salle University
- Nickname: Green Spikers
- Location: Taft Avenue, Manila
- Head coach: Jose Roque
- Captain: Jamiel Joshua Rodriguez

Main league
- League: UAAP; NCAA (former)
- Season 87 (2025): 4th Place

Other league/s
- League: Spikers' Turf
- Competes as: EcoOil–La Salle Green Oilers
- 2024 Invitational: 6th place

Championships
- UAAP: 2 NCAA: 4

The De La Salle Green Spikers are the men's collegiate varsity volleyball team of the De La Salle University. They compete in the University Athletic Association of the Philippines (UAAP).

== History ==
The men's volleyball team has won a total of six championship titles. La Salle was 4-peat NCAA men's champions from Seasons 53 to 56 (1977–1980). The team's also the V-League Collegiate Conference's champions on 2023. The Green Spikers were also UAAP men's champions in Seasons 64 and 66.

== Current roster ==
UAAP Season 88 roster
Number	Player	Position	Height	Birth date	High School	Playing Year
1	Uriel Mendoza	Outside Hitter	1.84 m (6'0 ft)		Trinitas College	3rd
3	Robert Flores	Libero	1.70 m (5'7 ft)		De La Salle Santiago Zobel School	1st
4	Ezer Jake Regidor	Setter	1.72 m (5’8 ft)		Davao City National High School	1st
5	Sherwin Retiro	Libero	1.70 m (5'7 ft)		Nazareth School of National University	1st
7	Eric Paolo Layug	Middle Blocker			Nazareth School of National University	3rd
9	Arjay Magallanes	Outside Hitter		September 17, 2006 (age 19)	Nazareth School of National University	1st
11	Eugene Gloria	Outside Hitter	1.82 m (6'0 ft)		Nazareth School of National University	2nd
12	Michael John Fortuna	Opposite Hitter			Nazareth School of National University	2nd (+1 residency)
13	Issa Ousseini	Middle Blocker	1.95 m (6’5 ft)			1st
14	Neil Laurence Flores	Libero	1.73 m (5'8 ft)		University of Santo Tomas Senior High School	1st
15	Matthew Thomas Abut	Outside Hitter	1.84 m (6’0 ft)	June 30, 2006 (age 19)	Nazareth School of National University	1st
17	Chris Emmanuel Hernandez	Outside Hitter	1.82 m (6'0 ft)	December 17, 2004 (age 21)	De La Salle Lipa	2nd
20	Glen Rui Ventura	Opposite Hitter			Saint Paul Christian School	3rd
21	Nathaniel Jamison Bangit	Setter	1.84 m (6'0 ft)		Niles West High School	1st (+1 residency)
22	Joshua Magalaman	Middle Blocker			Adamson University	1st
24	Joshua Jamiel Rodriguez	Middle Blocker			Lyceum of the Philippines University – Cavite	3rd

== Team honors ==
=== UAAP ===
De La Salle Green Spikers
Year	Season	Title	Ref
2001–2002	UAAP Season 64	Champions	
2003–2004	UAAP Season 66	Champions	

=== NCAA ===
De La Salle Green Archers
Year	Season	Title	Ref
1977–1978	NCAA Season 53	Champions	
1978–1979	NCAA Season 54	Champions	
1979–1980	NCAA Season 55	Champions	
1980–1981	NCAA Season 56	Champions	

=== Other collegiate leagues ===
De La Salle Green Spikers
Year	Tournament	Title	Ref
2023	2023 V-League Collegiate Challenge	Champions	
2024	2024 V-League Collegiate Challenge	Runner up	
2025	2025 V-League Collegiate Challenge	Runner up	

== Individual honors ==
=== UAAP ===
De La Salle Green Spikers
Year	Season	Award	Player	Ref
2003–2004	UAAP Season 66	Most Valuable Player	Janley Patrona	
2007–2008	UAAP Season 70	Best Blocker	Chris Macasaet	
2008–2009	UAAP Season 71	Best Digger	Bernardino Lorenz Casanova	
2009–2010	UAAP Season 72	Rookie of the Year	Christopher Michael Antonio	
2009–2010	UAAP Season 72	Best Scorer	Chris Macasaet	
2017–2018	UAAP Season 80	Best Digger	Jopet Movido	
2022–2023	UAAP Season 85	2nd Best Middle Blocker	Billie Jean Anima	
2023–2024	UAAP Season 86	2nd Best Middle Blocker	Nathaniel Del Pilar	
2023–2024	UAAP Season 86	Best Libero	Menard Guerrero	
2024–2025	UAAP Season 87	Best Libero	Menard Guerrero	

=== Other Collegiate Leagues ===
De La Salle Green Spikers
Year	Tournament	Award	Player	Ref
2016	2016 Spikers' Turf Collegiate Conference	2nd Best Outside Spiker	Raymark Woo	
2016	2016 Spikers' Turf Collegiate Conference	1st Best Middle Blocker	Rafael Del Pilar	
2023	2023 V-League Collegiate Challenge	Most Valuable Player (Finals)	Noel Michael Kampton	
2023	2023 V-League Collegiate Challenge	1st Best Outside Spiker	Noel Michael Kampton	
2023	2023 V-League Collegiate Challenge	Best Opposite Spiker	John Mark Ronquillo	
2023	2023 V-League Collegiate Challenge	Best Setter	Diogenes Poquita	
2023	2023 V-League Collegiate Challenge	Best Libero	Menard Guerrero	
2024	2024 V-League Collegiate Challenge	Best Setter	Jerico Adajar	
2024	2024 V-League Collegiate Challenge	2nd Best Outside Spiker	Chris Emmanuel Hernandez	
2024	2024 V-League Collegiate Challenge	2nd Best Middle Blocker	Joshua Magalaman	
2024	2024 V-League Collegiate Challenge	Best Libero	Menard Guerrero	
2025	2025 V-League Collegiate Challenge	Conference Most Valuable Player	Chris Emmanuel Hernandez	
2025	2025 V-League Collegiate Challenge	1st Best Outside Hitter	Chris Emmanuel Hernandez	
2025	2025 V-League Collegiate Challenge	1st Best Middle Blocker	Issa Ousseini	
2025	2025 V-League Collegiate Challenge	Best Libero	Sherwin Retiro	

== Records by season ==
Records starting UAAP Season 56

DLSU Green Spikers records by season
Year	UAAP Season	Title	Team captain	Won or Lost to (finalist or higher rank)
1993–1994	56	Runner-up		FEU Tamaraws
1994–1995	57	3rd Place		
1995–1996	58	Runner-up		UST Growling Tigers
1996–1997	59	3rd Place		
1997–1998	60	3rd Place		
1998–1999	61	3rd Place		
1999–2000	62	4th place		
2000–2001	63	4th place		
2001–2002	64	Champions		
2002–2003	65	Runner-up		
2003–2004	66	Champions		
2004–2005	67	3rd Place		
2005–2006	68	5th place		
2006–2007	69	Suspended		
2007–2008	70	6th place		
2008–2009	71	3rd Place		
2009–2010	72	5th place		
2010–2011	73	4th place		
2011–2012	74	4th place		
2012–2013	75	3rd Place		
2013–2014	76	5th place		
2014–2015	77	6th place		
2015–2016	78	6th place		
2016–2017	79	6th place		
2017–2018	80	6th place		
2018–2019	81	6th place		
2019–2020	82	cancelled		
2020–2021	83	cancelled		
2021–2022	84	cancelled		
2022–2023	85	4th place	Vince Gerard Maglinao	

== Notable players ==
- (Philippines) Chris Macasaet (MB)
- (Philippines) Noel Michael Kampton (OH)

Legend
S	Setter
L	Libero
MB	Middle Blocker
OH	Outside Hitter
OP	Opposite Hitter

== See also ==
- De La Salle University
  - De La Salle Green Archers and Lady Archers
    - De La Salle Green Archers basketball
    - De La Salle Lady Spikers volleyball
    - De La Salle Lady Booters football
