= V-League =

V-League or V.League may refer to:

- V.League (Japan), a professional volleyball league
  - SV.League, the top-level volleyball league in Japan
- V-League (South Korea), a professional volleyball league
- V-League (Philippines), a collegiate volleyball league
  - Shakey's V-League, now the Premier Volleyball League, a Filipino women's volleyball league
- V.League 1, a Vietnamese professional football (soccer) league, usually referred as just V.League
- SEA V.League, a volleyball competition in Southeast Asia
