= Basketball Coaches Association of the Philippines =

Organization and union of Filipino basketball coaches

- Abbreviation: BCAP
- President: Louie Gonzalez

The Basketball Coaches Association of the Philippines (BCAP) is an organization for Filipino coaches in the Philippines.

== Background ==
The Basketball Coaches Association of the Philippines' stated goal is to protect the interest of local Filipino basketball coaches in the Philippines.

They are largely involve in the 1990s case which got elevated to the Supreme Court which made it mostly impossible for foreigners to be a head coach in the Philippine Basketball Association (PBA). They lodge a protest against the appointment of American tactician Tim Cone as Alaska head coach in 1989. Cone would return to the PBA after acquiring permanent residency. Foreigners could only normally take coaching jobs in the PBA as an active consultant due to the BCAP case.

The BCAP has expressed preference for Filipinos in head coaching positions for PBA teams although they insist they remain open for foreigners to fill such roles "provided that no Filipino is qualified for the job. They do not have the same stance for the head coach position of the national team which they deem as not a permanent role.

== Activities ==
They organize clinics for local basketball coaches in the Philippines. The BCAP has partnerships with the Philippine Sports Commission, the Philippine Sports Institute, and the International Basketball University of Lithuania.

== Presidents ==
- Arturo Valenzona (founding president)
- Yeng Guiao (?–1998)
- Chito Narvasa (1998–2015)
- Alfrancis Chua (2015–2019)
- Louie Gonzalez (2019–)
