= Judiel Nitura =

Filipino volleyball player

Personal information
- Full name: Marie Judiel Nitura
- Nationality: Filipino
- Born: December 16, 2002 (age 23)
- Hometown: Aurora, Isabela
- Height: 1.70 m (5 ft 7 in)
- Education: Letran

Volleyball information
- Position: Opposite Hitter
- Number: 1

Marie Judiel Nitura (born December 16, 2002) is a Filipino volleyball player. She is an opposite hitter for the Letran Lady Knights of the National Collegiate Athletic Association (NCAA).

== Career ==
=== Collegiate ===
After attending high school at Adamson University, Nitura went to Colegio de San Juan de Letran for her college studies and play for the Lady Knights in the NCAA.

In her sophomore season, Nitura helped Letran return to the NCAA Season 99 final four after 12 years. They would later be runners-up to the Benilde Lady Blazers, though Nitura was the leading scorer at 12 points in Game 2 of the best-of-three title series.

Nitura was awarded the 2024 Shakey's Super League National Invitationals best opposite spiker.

== Personal life ==
Judiel Nitura hails from Aurora, Isabela Her younger sister is UAAP Athlete of the Year Shaina Nitura, the new team captain of the Adamson Lady Falcons.

== Awards ==
=== Individual ===
Year	Season/Conference	Award	Ref
2024	Shakey's Super League National Invitationals	Best Opposite Spiker	

=== Collegiate ===
Year	Season/Conference	Award	Ref
2024	NCAA Season 99	1st runners-up	
