= Chris Macasaet =

Filipino volleyball player

Personal information
- Nationality: Filipino
- Born: February 7, 1988 (age 38)
- Height: 1.83 m (6 ft 0 in)
- Education: De La Salle University

Volleyball information
- Position: Middle Blocker
- Current club: Systema Active Smashers
- Number: 1

Chris Macasaet (born February 7, 1988) is a Filipino volleyball player. He played for the De La Salle University collegiate men's volleyball team. He also played for the Systema Active Smashers in the Spikers' Turf.

== Career ==
=== Collegiate ===
Macasaet made his first game appearance with the De La Salle Green Archers collegiate men's volleyball team in the UAAP Season 70 where they failed to advance to the semi-finals after being placed 6th.

In UAAP Season 71, they had a 10–4 win–loss record in the preliminary round. They failed to advanced to the finals after being defeated by UP Fighting Maroons in the semis.

In UAAP Season 72, they had a 7–7 win–loss record in the preliminaries, tied with UP Fighting Maroons. They failed to advance to the semis after being defeated by UP Fighting Maroons in the 4th seeded playoffs.

UAAP Season 73 was last year that Macasaet played for the De La Salle Green Archers. The team acquired an 8–6 win–loss record in the preliminaries, tied with UP Fighting Maroons. They were defeated by UST in the semis.

== Clubs ==
- (Philippines) Systema Active Smashers (2014)

== Awards ==
=== Individual ===
| Year | League | Season/Conference | Award | Ref |
|---|---|---|---|---|
| 2008 | UAAP | 70 | Best Blocker | |
| 2010 | UAAP | 72 | Best Scorer | |
| 2014 | PSL | All-Filipino | 1st Best Middle Blocker | |

=== Collegiate ===
| Year | UAAP Season | Title | Ref |
|---|---|---|---|
| 2009 | 71 | 3rd place | |

=== Clubs ===
| Year | League | Season/Conference | Club | Title | Ref |
|---|---|---|---|---|---|
| 2014 | PSL | All-Filipino | Systema Active Smashers | 3rd place | |
