= Philippines national volleyball team =

Philippines national volleyball team (or Alas Pilipinas) may refer to:

- Philippines men's national volleyball team
- Philippines women's national volleyball team

Youth teams:

- Philippines men's national under-19 volleyball team
- Philippines men's national under-23 volleyball team
- Philippines women's national under-19 volleyball team
- Philippines women's national under-21 volleyball team
- Philippines women's national under-23 volleyball team

Beach volleyball teams:

- Philippines men's national beach volleyball team
- Philippines women's national beach volleyball team
