= Rajko Toroman =

Serbian professional basketball coach (born 1955)

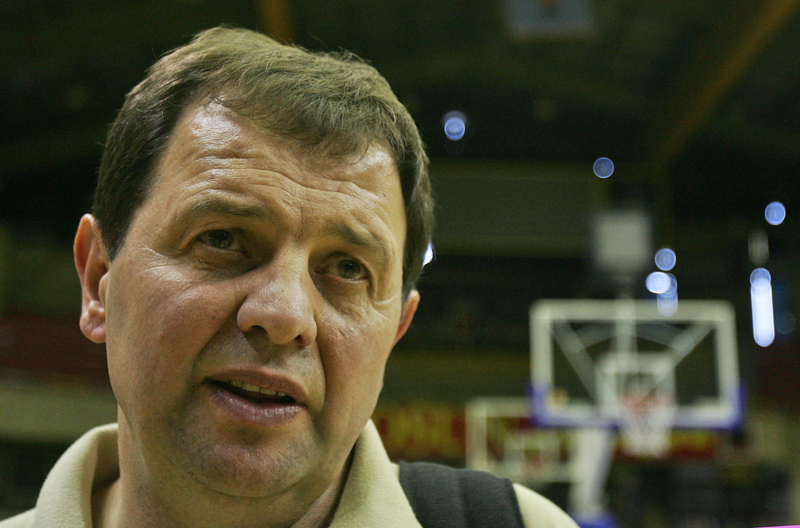
- Toroman in May 2008.

Converge FiberXers
- Position: Consultant
- League: PBA

Personal information
- Born: February 10, 1955 (age 71) Belgrade, PR Serbia, FPR Yugoslavia
- Coaching career: 1991–present

Career history

Coaching
- 1991–1996: FR Yugoslavia (assistant)
- 1992: Sloga
- 1993: Vojvodina
- 1994–1995: Pagrati
- 1995–1997: Spartak
- 1996: FR Yugoslavia U-22
- 1997–1998: Anwil Włocławek
- 1999: Radnički Belgrade
- 1999–2001: Power Wevelgem
- 2002–2003: MyGuide Amsterdam
- 2003–2004: Keravnos
- 2004–2005: Henan Dragons
- 2005: Igokea
- 2005–2007: Debreceni Vadkakasok
- 2007–2008: Iran
- 2009–2011: Philippines
- 2012: Petron Blaze Boosters (consultant)
- 2013: Barako Bull Energy (consultant)
- 2014–2016: Jordan
- 2016–2018: Tianjin Ronggang
- 2018–2019: Al-Muharraq
- 2019–2022: Indonesia
- 2023–present: Benilde (consultant)
- 2023–present: Converge FiberXers (consultant)
Medals
Men's basketball
Head coach for FR Yugoslavia
'22 & under' European Championship
Bronze medal – third place	1996 Turkey	Team
Head coach for Iran
FIBA Asia Championship
Gold medal – first place	2007 Tokushima	Team
Head coach for Philippines
SEABA Championship
Gold medal – first place	2011 Jakarta	Team
William Jones Cup
Bronze medal – third place	2011 Taipei	Team

Rajko Toroman (Serbian Cyrillic: Рајко Тороман; born February 10, 1955) is a Serbian professional basketball coach.

== Coaching career ==
Before 2016, he served as a team consultant for the Barako Bull Energy Cola and the Petron Blaze Boosters in the Philippine Basketball Association. He previously coached the Philippines men's national basketball team having been hired by country's basketball federation Samahang Basketbol ng Pilipinas. Toroman led the Philippines into 4th place in the 2011 FIBA Asia Championship. From 2014 to 2016, he served as the head coach of the Jordan men's national basketball team.

Before working in the Philippines, he worked with the Iran men's national basketball team which brought the country to the 2008 Beijing Olympic Games.

He represented the Philippines in the 2019 William Jones Cup as the lead assistant coach for Mighty Sports.

He also served as head coach of the Indonesia men's national basketball team from 2019 to 2022.

== Personal life ==
Toroman is married, has one daughter, Sandra, who was married to basketball player Mladen Šekularac. Toroman's grandson and Sandra's son, Đorđe Šekularac was a member of the Serbian Under-16 team and was starting small forward for the U18 Partizan Belgrade team in the Junior Euroleague. Toroman's nephew Denis plays professional basketball for KK Luka Koper in the Premier A Slovenian Basketball League.
