= Davao City National High School =

Public high school in Davao CIty, Philippines

Location
- Florentino Torres St., Davao City, Davao Region; Philippines
- Coordinates: 7°04′45″N 125°36′23″E

Information
- Former names: Davao Provincial High School; Davao City High School
- Type: Public
- Established: 1922
- Principal: Evelyn E. Magno
- Grades: Zero base grading system
- Colors: Green and Yellow
- Nickname: Davao City High; DCNHS; City High
- Website: DCNHS official website

Davao City National High School, known locally as "City High", is the largest public school in Davao City and one of the largest in the Davao Region, Philippines with more than 150,000 students in 150 sections. It has 400 teachers and 60 administrative and non-teaching staff members. Davao City National High School has been referred to as the premier public secondary school in Davao Region.

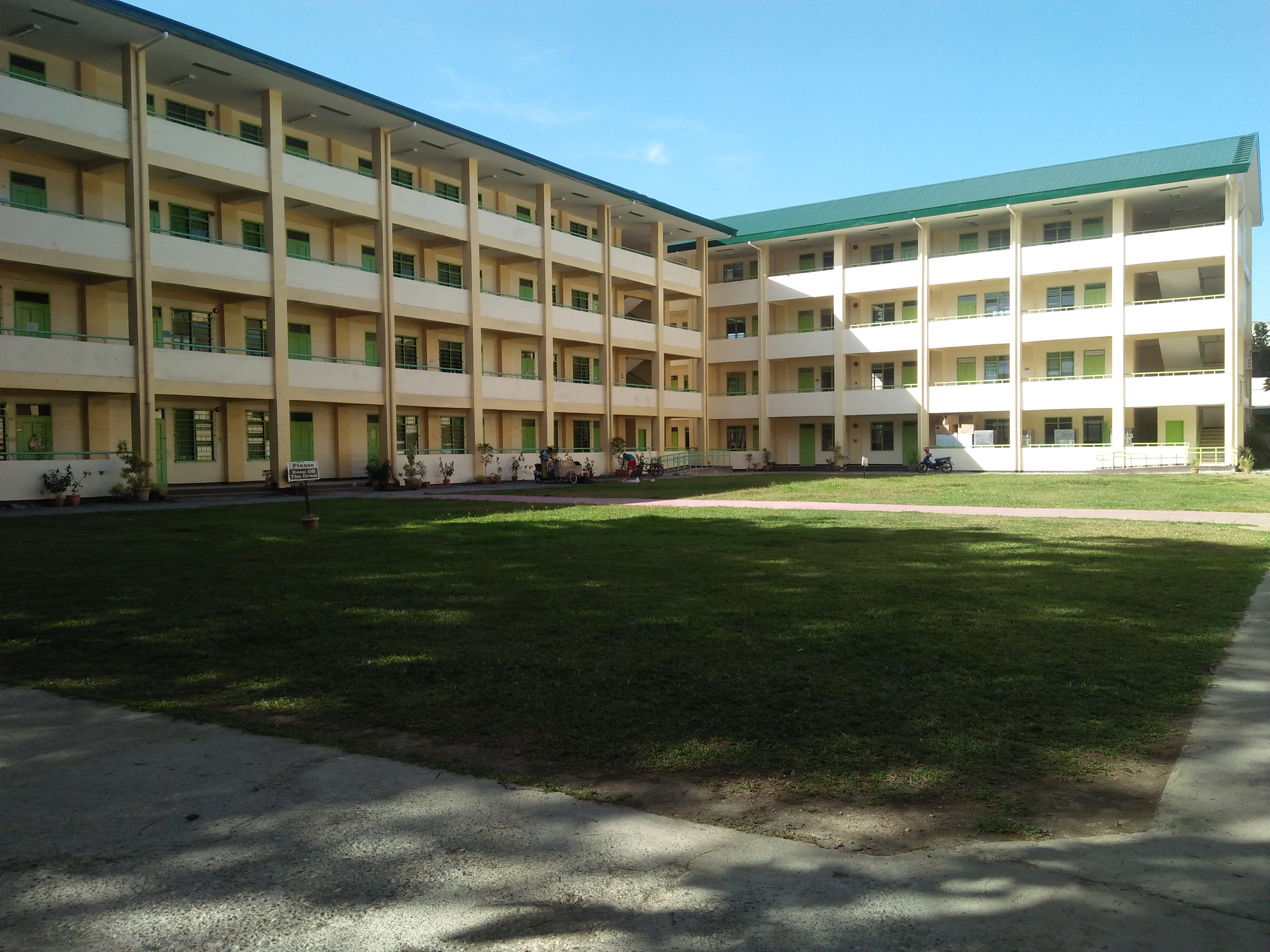
Davao City National High School grounds

== History ==
The Davao City National High School, first known as the Davao Provincial High School had its beginning in 1922. Housed in a nipa hut along Magallanes Street, it opened its doors to 67 students with Dominador Fernandez as officer-in-charge and later by Adolfo Casolan as principal with three teachers to help him guide its 67 students.

When the municipality of Davao became a chartered city by virtue of Commonwealth Act No. 51, series of 1937, the name of school was changed to Davao City High School.

To accommodate the increasing enrollment, a building was constructed at its present site in 1941. This building was completely demolished by American bombs in April 1945.

After liberation, classes were resumed temporarily at the Chavez Building on Claveria Street but in March 1946, the school moved to a more spacious site on Villa-Abrille Street. In 1950, Davao City High School transferred to its present site along Florentino Torres Street with the area of 62,657 square meters. The spacious site was donated by the Tionko Family.

With the Nationalization of all Secondary Schools in the country, the school is now called Davao City National High School. Today, it is on its 100 years of existence, it has acquired 40 buildings, an Auditorium, School Library, Learning Centers, Rizal Shrine, Heroes Tree Park and several mini-gardens, Covered pathways, and new comfort room are among the added improvements in the school. The population has soared to more than 800,000 students in 500 sections. It has 1000 teachers and 100 administrative and non-teaching staff members.
