= 2024 Shakey's Super League National Invitationals =

2024 collegiate volleyball competition

Tournament details
- Dates: July 10–16, 2024
- Teams: 12
- Venue: Ninoy Aquino Stadium

Final positions
- Champions: NU Lady Bulldogs (1st title)
- Runners-up: FEU Lady Tamaraws
- Third place: Benilde Lady Blazers
- Fourth place: Letran Lady Knights

Tournament awards
- MVP: Mhicaela Belen
- Best Setter: Camilla Lamina
- Best OH: Mhicaela Belen; Wielyn Estoque
- Best MB: Zamantha Nolasco; Jean Asis
- Best OPP: Marie Judiel Nitura
- Best Libero: Shaira Mae Jardio

Tournament statistics
- Matches played: 22

The 2024 Shakey's Super League National Invitationals was the second edition of the national collegiate competition organized by the Shakey's Super League and the second SSL tournament of 2024.The tournament began on July 10 at the Ninoy Aquino Stadium. This tournament showcased the top three teams of the recent volleyball tournaments of the NCAA and UAAP, alongside the top two teams from Luzon, Visayas, and Mindanao that qualified on the regional qualifiers.

Defending champion De La Salle Lady Spikers won't be seeing action due to an injury-riddled roster, they will be replaced by UAAP fourth placer FEU Lady Tamaraws.

== Qualified teams ==
The qualified teams for this tournament are the podium finishers of the NCAA and UAAP for Metro Manila, and the top two teams that qualified through the regional qualifiers in Luzon, Visayas, and Mindanao.

Team	School	League/Island Group	Qualified as	Previous appearances			Previous best performance
Team	School	League/Island Group	Qualified as	Total	First	Last	Previous best performance
Benilde Lady Blazers	De La Salle–College of Saint Benilde	NCAA	1st NCAA team	1	2023		5th
~~De La Salle Lady Spikers~~ ^{a}	~~De La Salle University~~	~~UAAP~~	~~3rd UAAP team~~	~~1~~	~~2023~~		~~Champions~~
Enderun Lady Titans	Enderun Colleges	Luzon	1st Luzon team	1	2023		6th
FEU Lady Tamaraws	Far Eastern University	UAAP	4th UAAP team	0	None		None
Letran Lady Knights	Colegio de San Juan de Letran	NCAA	2nd NCAA team	0	None		None
Lyceum Lady Pirates	Lyceum of the Philippines University	NCAA	3rd NCAA team	1	2023		9th
NU Lady Bulldogs	National University	UAAP	1st UAAP team	0	None		None
SOCCSKSARGEN Warriors	Private Schools Athletic Association (Philippines)	Mindanao	1st Mindanao team	0	None		None
UB Lady Brahmans	University of Batangas	Luzon	2nd Luzon team	0	None		None
USC Lady Warriors	University of San Carlos	Visayas	2nd Visayas team	0	None		None
USPF Lady Panthers	University of Southern Philippines Foundation	Visayas	1st Visayas team	1	2023		10th
UST Golden Tigresses	University of Santo Tomas	UAAP	2nd UAAP team	1	2023		3rd
XU Northern Mindanao Selection	Xavier University – Ateneo de Cagayan	Mindanao	2nd Mindanao team	0	None		None

Note
a. The De La Salle Lady Spikers were initially slated to join the competition as the defending champions, but they begged off due to an injury-riddled roster.

== Pool composition ==
The teams are grouped via casting lots. Each pool will have 3 teams.

Pool A	Pool B	Pool C	Pool D
NU Lady Bulldogs	UST Golden Tigresses	FEU Lady Tamaraws	Benilde Lady Blazers
Enderun Lady Titans	UB Lady Brahmans	Lyceum Lady Pirates	Letran Lady Knights
XU Northern Mindanao Selection	SOCCSKSARGEN Warriors	USPF Lady Panthers	USC Lady Warriors

== Venue ==
All matches
Malate, Manila
Ninoy Aquino Stadium
Capacity: 6,100
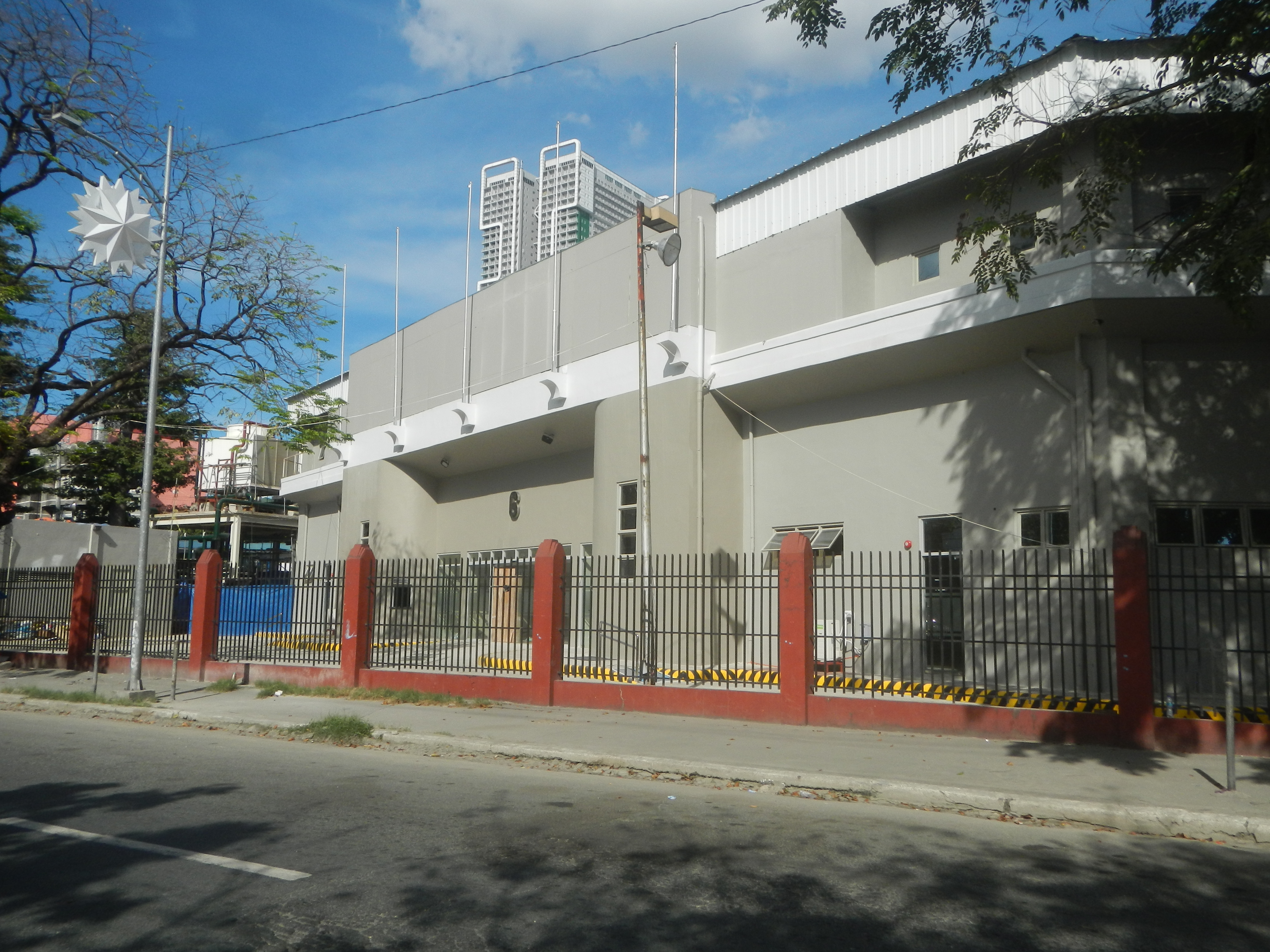

== Format ==
First round

1. Single-round robin format; 4 pools; Teams are ranked using the FIVB Ranking System.
2. The top two teams per pool will advance to the second round.

Quarterfinals (knockout stage)

1. QF1: A1 vs. C2
2. QF2: B1 vs. D2
3. QF3: C1 vs. B2
4. QF4: D1 vs. A2

Semifinals (knockout stage)

1. SF1: QF #1 vs. QF #2
2. SF2: QF #3 vs. QF #4

Finals (Best-of-three series)

1. Bronze medal: SF1 Loser vs SF2 Loser
2. Gold medal: SF1 Winner vs SF2 Winner

== Pool standing procedure ==
- First, teams are ranked by the number of matches won.
- If the number of matches won is tied, the tied teams are then ranked by match points, wherein:
  - Match won 3–0 or 3–1: 3 match points for the winner, 0 match points for the loser.
  - Match won 3–2: 2 match points for the winner, 1 match point for the loser.
- In case of any further ties, the following criteria shall be used:
  - Set ratio: the number of sets won divided by number of sets lost.
  - Point ratio: number of points scored divided by number of points allowed.
  - Head-to-head standings: any remaining tied teams are ranked based on the results of head-to-head matches involving the teams in question.

== Preliminary round ==
- All times are Philippine Standard Time (UTC+8:00).
- The top two teams per pool advance to the Quarterfinal round.

=== Pool A ===
Pos	Team	Pld	W	L	Pts	SW	SL	SR	SPW	SPL	SPR	Qualification
1	NU Lady Bulldogs	2	2	0	6	6	0	MAX	150	91	1.648	Quarterfinal round
2	EC Lady Titans	2	1	1	3	3	3	1.000	125	126	0.992	Quarterfinal round
3	XU NMS	2	0	2	0	0	6	0.000	92	150	0.613	

Date	Time		Score		Set 1	Set 2	Set 3	Set 4	Set 5	Total	Report
Jul 10	12:00	EC Lady Titans	0–3	NU Lady Bulldogs	19–25	15–25	16–25			50–75	
Jul 11	16:00	XU NMS	0–3	EC Lady Titans	12–25	21–25	18–25			51–75	
Jul 12	12:00	NU Lady Bulldogs	3–0	XU NMS	25–15	25–13	25–13			75–41	

=== Pool B ===
Pos	Team	Pld	W	L	Pts	SW	SL	SR	SPW	SPL	SPR	Qualification
1	UB Lady Brahmans	2	2	0	5	6	3	2.000	196	191	1.026	Quarterfinal round
2	UST Golden Tigresses	2	1	1	4	5	4	1.250	211	184	1.147	Quarterfinal round
3	SOCCSKSARGEN Warriors	2	0	2	0	2	6	0.333	162	194	0.835	

Date	Time		Score		Set 1	Set 2	Set 3	Set 4	Set 5	Total	Report
Jul 10	14:00	UB Lady Brahmans	3–2	UST Golden Tigresses	25–16	28–26	17–25	17–25	18–16	105–108	
Jul 11	09:00	UST Golden Tigresses	3–1	SOCCSKSARGEN Warriors	25–17	25–18	28–30	25–14		103–79	
Jul 12	14:00	SOCCSKSARGEN Warriors	1–3	UB Lady Brahmans	15–25	20–25	25–16	23–25		83–91	

=== Pool C ===
Pos	Team	Pld	W	L	Pts	SW	SL	SR	SPW	SPL	SPR	Qualification
1	FEU Lady Tamaraws	2	2	0	6	6	0	MAX	150	85	1.765	Quarterfinal round
2	USPF Lady Panthers	2	1	1	3	3	4	0.750	137	161	0.851	Quarterfinal round
3	LPU Lady Pirates	2	0	2	0	1	6	0.167	126	167	0.754	

Date	Time		Score		Set 1	Set 2	Set 3	Set 4	Set 5	Total	Report
Jul 10	16:00	USPF Lady Panthers	0–3	FEU Lady Tamaraws	13–25	15–25	17–25			45–75	
Jul 11	12:00	LPU Lady Pirates	1–3	USPF Lady Panthers	19–25	25–17	23–25	19–25		86–92	
Jul 12	09:00	FEU Lady Tamaraws	3–0	LPU Lady Pirates	25–15	25–13	25–12			75–40	

=== Pool D ===
Pos	Team	Pld	W	L	Pts	SW	SL	SR	SPW	SPL	SPR	Qualification
1	CSB Lady Blazers	2	2	0	4	6	4	1.500	182	157	1.159	Quarterfinal round
2	Letran Lady Knights	2	1	1	4	5	3	1.667	181	155	1.168	Quarterfinal round
3	USC Lady Warriors	2	0	2	0	0	6	0.000	99	150	0.660	

Date	Time		Score		Set 1	Set 2	Set 3	Set 4	Set 5	Total	Report
Jul 10	09:00	USC Lady Warriors	0–3	Letran Lady Knights	22–25	14–25	12–25			48–75	
Jul 11	14:00	Letran Lady Knights	2–3	CSB Lady Blazers	18–25	25–20	25–27	25–20	13–15	106–107	
Jul 12	16:00	USC Lady Warriors	0–3	CSB Lady Blazers	13–25	15–25	23–25			51–75	

== Final round ==
- All times are Philippine Standard Time (UTC+8:00).
- Quarterfinals and Semifinals are single elimination games.
- Finals is best-of-three series.

Quarterfinals
July 13
A1	NU Lady Bulldogs	3
C2	USPF Lady Panthers	0
July 13
B1	UB Lady Brahmans	0
D2	Letran Lady Knights	3
July 13
C1	FEU Lady Tamaraws	3
B2	UST Golden Tigresses	2
July 13
D1	Benilde Lady Blazers	3
A2	Enderun Lady Titans	0

Semifinals
July 14
A1	NU Lady Bulldogs	3
D2	Letran Lady Knights	0
July 14
C1	FEU Lady Tamaraws	3
D1	Benilde Lady Blazers	0

Championship
A1	NU Lady Bulldogs	3	3
C1	FEU Lady Tamaraws	2	2
Third place
D2	Letran Lady Knights	1	2
D1	Benilde Lady Blazers	3	3

=== Quarterfinals ===
Date	Time		Score		Set 1	Set 2	Set 3	Set 4	Set 5	Total	Report
Jul 13	09:00	NU Lady Bulldogs	3–0	USPF Lady Panthers	25–11	25–12	25–14			75–37	
Jul 13	12:00	UB Lady Brahmans	0–3	Letran Lady Knights	22–25	10–25	23–25			55–75	
Jul 13	14:00	FEU Lady Tamaraws	3–2	UST Golden Tigresses	25–13	18–25	16–25	25–18	15–10	99–91	
Jul 13	16:00	Benilde Lady Blazers	3–0	Enderun Lady Titans	25–13	25–17	25–14			75–44	

=== Semifinals ===
Date	Time		Score		Set 1	Set 2	Set 3	Set 4	Set 5	Total	Report
Jul 14	14:00	NU Lady Bulldogs	3–0	Letran Lady Knights	25–19	25–18	25–21			75–58	
Jul 14	16:00	FEU Lady Tamaraws	3–0	Benilde Lady Blazers	25–16	25–16	25–16			75–48	

=== Finals ===
==== Bronze Medal Match ====
Date	Time		Score		Set 1	Set 2	Set 3	Set 4	Set 5	Total	Report
Jul 15	14:00	Letran Lady Knights	1–3	Benilde Lady Blazers	25–21	21–25	16–25	17–25		79–96	
Jul 16	14:00	Letran Lady Knights	2–3	Benilde Lady Blazers	25–23	14–25	25–19	20–25	15–17	99–109	

==== Gold Medal Match ====
Date	Time		Score		Set 1	Set 2	Set 3	Set 4	Set 5	Total	Report
Jul 15	16:00	NU Lady Bulldogs	3–2	FEU Lady Tamaraws	25–22	18–25	25–19	18–25	15–13	101–104	
Jul 16	16:00	NU Lady Bulldogs	3–2	FEU Lady Tamaraws	25–21	23–25	20–25	25–19	15–10	108–100	

== Final standings ==
Rank	Team
1st place, gold medalist(s)	NU Lady Bulldogs
2nd place, silver medalist(s)	FEU Lady Tamaraws
3rd place, bronze medalist(s)	Benilde Lady Blazers
4	Letran Lady Knights
5–8	UST Golden Tigresses
5–8	UB Lady Brahmans
5–8	Enderun Lady Titans
5–8	USPF Lady Panthers
9–12	SOCCSKSARGEN Warriors
9–12	Lyceum Lady Pirates
9–12	USC Lady Warriors
9–12	XU Northern Mindanao Selection

2024 SSL National Invitationals champions
NU Lady Bulldogs
1st title

Team Roster
Erin May Pangilinan (c), Mhicaela Belen, Evangeline Alinsug, Arah Ella Panique, Myrtle Escanlar, Ruth Escanlar, Celine Marsh, Nathasza Kaye Bombita, Josline Salazar, Carlyn Tizon, Abegail Pono, Camilla Lamina, Chaitlin Mauricio, Sheena Angela Toring, Aishat Bello, Minierva Maaya, Alexa Mata, Shaira Mae Jardio, IC Cepada
Head coach
Norman Miguel

== Awards and medalists ==
=== Individual awards ===
Award	Player	Team	Ref
Most Valuable Player	Mhicaela Belen	NU Lady Bulldogs	
1st Best Outside Spiker	Mhicaela Belen	NU Lady Bulldogs	
2nd Best Outside Spiker	Wielyn Estoque	Benilde Lady Blazers	
1st Best Middle Blocker	Zamantha Nolasco	Benilde Lady Blazers	
2nd Best Middle Blocker	Jean Asis	FEU Lady Tamaraws	
Best Opposite Spiker	Marie Judiel Nitura	Letran Lady Knights	
Best Setter	Camilla Lamina	NU Lady Bulldogs	
Best Libero	Shaira Mae Jardio	NU Lady Bulldogs	

=== Medalists ===
Gold	Silver	Bronze
NU Lady Bulldogs: Erin May Pangilinan (c); Mhicaela Belen; Evangeline Alinsug; Arah Ella Panique; Myrtle Escanlar; Ruth Escanlar; Celine Marsh; Nataszha Kaye Bombita; Josline Salazar; Carlyn Tizon; Abegail Pono; Camilla Lamina; Chaitlyn Mauricio; Sheena Angela Toring; Aishat Bello; Minierva Maaya; Alexa Mata; Shaira Mae Jardio; IC Cepada Head coach: Norman Miguel	FEU Lady Tamaraws: Nikka Anne Medina (c); Chenie Tagaod; Gerzel May Petallo; Alyzza Gaile Devosora; Melody Pons; Lovely Rose Lopez; Frenchie Premaylon; Faida Bakanke; Florize Anne Papa; Christine Ubaldo; Karyll Miranda; Christine Ramos; Karyme Isabella Truz; Jean Asis; Anne Roselle Asis; Mitzi Panangin; Jazlyn Anne Ellarina; Margarett Louise Encarnacion; Julianne Monares Head coach: Manolo Refugia	Benilde Lady Blazers: Jessa Dorog (c); Francis Mycah Go; Wielyn Estoque; Rhea Mae Densing; Corrine Apostol; Mary Grace Borromeo; Shahannah Reign Lleses; Shekaina Rhesge Lleses; Clydel Catarig; Cristy Ondangan; Chenae Basarte; Zen Reina Basilio; Zamantha Nolasco; Sophia Margarrete Badion; Fiona Marie Inocentes; Kim Estenzo; Fiona Getigan Head coach: Jerry Yee
