= Letran Lady Knights volleyball =

Philippine college volleyball team

Letran Lady Knights
- University: Colegio de San Juan de Letran
- Nickname: Lady Knights
- Founded: 1977
- Location: Intramuros, Manila
- Head coach: Mayeth Carolino (1st season)
- Captain: Lara Mae Silva

Main league
- League: NCAA
- Season 101 (2026): (gold) Champions

Championships
- NCAA: 9: 1977–78; 1978–79; 1979–80; 1980–81; 1981–82; 1985–86; 1997–98; 1998–99; 2025–26

The Letran Lady Knights are the women's collegiate varsity volleyball team representing Colegio de San Juan de Letran in the National Collegiate Athletic Association (NCAA) in the Philippines.

The Lady Knights have won nine NCAA championships since the inception of women's volleyball in 1975.

== History ==
The NCAA volleyball tournament for women's division began in 1975. The Letran Lady Knights was formed in 1977 with only seven players, mentored by Herminio "Boggs" Rivera. On that same year, they have captured their very first NCAA title. The team was called as the "Magnificent Seven" because the team debuted and have won the competition with only seven players. The Lady Knights then added eight more players and later captured four more consecutive titles in 1978 to 1981, then another one in 1985.

In 1997 and 1998, the Lady Knights captured their sixth and seventh titles. The team was bannered by two siblings, Michelle Carolino and Marietta "Mayeth" Carolino, and mentored by Nestor "Nes" Pamilar, with the help from then-assistant coaches Ramil de Jesus and Mike Inoferio . The Carolino sisters would make a name in Shakey's V-League and the Philippine national team.

In 2011, the team would make their first Finals appearance since taking the title in 1998. But this would result in a heartbreak as they were beaten by the UPHSD Lady Altas. The team was bannered by Melissa Cu and Marinelle Carolino, younger sister of Michelle and Mayeth.

In 2023, Letran officials hired alumnus and former Petro Gazz Angels head coach Oliver Almadro. Almadro steered the Lady Knights to back-to-back Finals appearances.

In 2025, Finnish volleyball club Oriveden Ponnistus assistant coach Aleksi Lähteenmäki replaced Oliver Almadro as the new head coach of the Lady Knights. Later on, Letran alumnus Mayeth Carolino was named head coach of the Lady Knights, while Lähteenmäki was assigned assistant coach and team consultant. The team would again bagged the NCAA title after 27 years after beating their Season 99 and Season 100 tormentors, the CSB Lady Blazers. Team captain Lara Mae Silva bagged the Best Libero honor, while was Judiel Nitura was named the Best Opposite Hitter and Finals MVP.

== Current roster ==
NCAA Season 101

Letran Lady Knights
No.	Name	Position
1	NITURA, Marie Judiel	Opposite Hitter
4	NAPAL, Marjorie	Outside Hitter
6	PADILLA, Leonilyn	Middle Blocker
7	MARTIN, Niezelle Aeriyen	Outside hitter
8	TUMAYAO, Princess Zyne	Setter
9	PANANGIN, Joralyn	Outside Hitter
10	ESTRELLER, Natalie Marie	Setter
12	COLENDRA, Verenicce	Spiker
14	ENVERGA, Marbey Allen	Libero
15	SARIE, Sheena Vanessa	Outside Hitter
16	ISAR, Lastlie Jade	Middle Blocker
17	FLORES, Hizki	Outside Hitter
19	SILVA, Lara Mae (c)	Libero
23	SILORIO, Syra Joy	Middle Blocker
25	MAQUILANG, Gia Marcel	Outside Hitter

=== Team staff ===
Name	Position
Marietta Carolino	Head coach
Aleksi Markus Lähteenmäki	Assistant coach
Ludlo Dulce	Assistant coach
Kaycee Balingit	Assistant coach
Keiara Almirante	Student manager
Enrico Rafael Francisco	Strength & cond. coach
Patrick Marquez	Physical therapist

== Past rosters ==
Letran Lady Knights–1977-78 NCAA Season 53 champions "The Magnificent Seven"
Alicia Abuel ∙ Rosalie Arandia ∙ Ernestina Cristobal ∙ Melba Gan ∙ Nancy Gan ∙ Resurreccion Garcia ∙ Donna Tengson
Head coach: Herminio Rivera

Letran Lady Knights–1978-79 NCAA Season 54 champions
Alicia Abuel ∙ Marissa Agravante ∙ Rosalie Arandia ∙ Imelda Cabrera ∙ Ernestina Cristobal ∙ Gene Cruz ∙ Melba Gan ∙ Nancy Gan ∙ Resurreccion Garcia ∙ Elisa Laserna ∙ Flordelisa Mendoza ∙ Leonor Tagle ∙ Donna Tengson ∙ Florenciana Tolentino ∙ Miriam Trice
Head coach: Herminio Rivera

Letran Lady Knights–2011-12 NCAA Season 87 runners-up
Gena Keeisha Andaya ∙ Patricia Anne Belleza ∙ Marinelle Jane Carolino ∙ Melissa Mae Cu ∙ Sarah Jane Espelita ∙ Rose Valerie Guevarra ∙ France Lauren Lopez ∙ Queenie Mondejar ∙ Monique Pablo ∙ Angelica Santos ∙ Justyne Mae Tadeo ∙ Lallane Villarin ∙ Jamaika Villas
Head coach: Bryan Esquibel

Letran Lady Knights–2012-13 NCAA Season 88 roster
Patricia Anne Belleza ∙ Jan Juno Carreon ∙ Melissa Mae Cu ∙ Sarah Jane Espelita ∙ Yvette Forto ∙ Honey Kris Laserna ∙ Mikaela Lopez ∙ Cynthia Molina ∙ Queennie Mondejar ∙ Monique Joy Pablo ∙ Justyne Mae Tadeo ∙ Jamaika Rikka Villas
Head coach: Bryan Esquibel

Letran Lady Knights–2017-18 NCAA Season 93 roster
Elizza Abitan ∙ Julia Angeles ∙ Entezar Bangcola ∙ Kathleen Barrinuevo ∙ Jan Juno Carreon ∙ Mariel Larioque ∙ Honey Kris Laserna ∙ Mikaela Lopez ∙ Miracle Mhae Mendoza ∙ Jaymeleene Parin ∙ Marie Charlmagne Simborio ∙ Glayssa Torres
Head coach: Michael Inoferio

Letran Lady Knights–2019-20 NCAA Season 95 roster
Julia Angeles ∙ Julienne Rose Castro ∙ Chamberlaine Cuñada ∙ Kathleen Dela Cruz ∙ Daisy Melendres ∙ Kristine Joy Miranda ∙ Khryss Anne Monteagudo ∙ Edna Ann Musngi ∙ Dane Iam Ohya ∙ Erica Mae Santos ∙ Marie Charlmagne Simborio ∙ Rio Trina Soriano ∙ Lea Rizel Tapang ∙ Shereena Urmeneta
Head coach: Bryan Esquibel

Letran Lady Knights–2021-22 NCAA Season 97 roster
Angel Afgao ∙ Cristine Kate Calixto ∙ Julienne Rose Castro ∙ Chamberlaine Cuñada ∙ Kathleen Dela Cruz ∙ Royce Dela Cruz ∙ Natalie Marie Estreller ∙ Lastlie Jade Isar ∙ Angelique Ledesma ∙ Clarence Marcos ∙ Daisy Melendres ∙ Khryss Anne Monteagudo ∙ Edma Anne Musngi ∙ Alyssa Jeremay Santos ∙ Lara Mae Silva ∙ Lea Rizel Tapang ∙ Shereena Urmeneta
Head coach: Michael Inoferio

Letran Lady Knights–2022-23 NCAA Season 98 roster
Keiara Marie Almirante ∙ Julienne Rose Castro ∙ Chamberlaine Cuñada ∙ Kathleen Dela Cruz ∙ Trisha Dequilla ∙ Natalie Marie Estreller ∙ Lastlie Jade Isar ∙ Angelique Ledesma ∙ Daisy Melendres ∙ Edma Anne Musngi ∙ Marie Judiel Nitura ∙ Andre Roshe Relucio ∙ Alyssa Jeremay Santos ∙ Lara Mae Silva ∙ Lea Rizel Tapang ∙ Shereena Urmeneta
Head coach: Michael Inoferio

Letran Lady Knights–2023-24 NCAA Season 99 runners-up
Keiara Marie Almirante ∙ Cristine Kate Calixto ∙ Royce Dela Cruz ∙ Trisha Dequilla ∙ Natalie Marie Estreller ∙ Lastlie Jade Isar ∙ Angelique Ledesma ∙ Nizelle Aeriyen Martin ∙ Gia Marcel Maquilang ∙ Jogi Maquilang ∙ Daisy Melendres ∙ Marie Judiel Nitura ∙ Andre Roshe Relucio ∙ Alyssa Jeremay Santos ∙ Lara Mae Silva ∙ Lea Rizel Tapang ∙ Aziejay Andrea Yap
Head coach: Oliver Almadro

Letran Lady Knights–2024-25 NCAA Season 100 runners-up
Edcynth Pearl Brago ∙ Verenicce Colendra ∙ Royce Dela Cruz ∙ Natalie Marie Estreller ∙ Marbey Allen Enverga ∙ Hizki Flores ∙ Lastlie Jade Isar ∙ Nizelle Aeriyen Martin ∙ Gia Marcel Maquilang ∙ Marjorie Napal ∙ Marie Judiel Nitura ∙ Leonilyn Padilla ∙ Joralyn Panangin ∙ Sheena Vanessa Sarie ∙ Lara Mae Silva ∙ Princess Zyne Tumayao
Head coach: Oliver Almadro

Letran Lady Knights–2025-26 NCAA Season 101 champions
Verenicce Colendra ∙ Natalie Marie Estreller ∙ Marbey Allen Enverga ∙ Hizki Flores ∙ Lastlie Jade Isar ∙ Nizelle Aeriyen Martin ∙ Gia Marcel Maquilang ∙ Marjorie Napal ∙ Marie Judiel Nitura ∙ Leonilyn Padilla ∙ Joralyn Panangin ∙ Sheena Vanessa Sarie ∙ Syra Joy Silorio ∙ Lara Mae Silva ∙ Princess Zyne Tumayao
Head coach: Marietta Carolino
Asst. coaches: Aleksi Markus Lähteenmäki ∙ Ludlo Dulce ∙ Kayce Balingit
Student manager: Keiara Almirante ∙ Trainers: Enrico Rafael Francisco ∙ Patrick Marquez

== Team honors ==
=== NCAA ===
Letran Lady Knights (partial awards)
Year	Season	Title	Ref
1977-78	53	Champions	
1978-79	54	Champions	
1979-80	55	Champions	
1980-81	56	Champions	
1981-82	57	Champions	
1985-86	61	Champions	
1997-98	73	Champions	
1998-99	74	Champions	
2005-06	81	3rd place	
2006-07	82	Runner-up	
2007-08	83	3rd place	
2010-11	86	Runner-up	
2011-12	87	Runner-up	
2023-24	99	Runner-up	
2024-25	100	Runner-up	
2025-26	101	Champions	

=== SSL ===
Letran Lady Knights
Season	Conference	Title	Ref
2022	Pre-Season	13th place	
2023	Pre-Season	13th place	
2024	Invitationals	3rd place	
2024	Pre-Season	12th place	
2025	Invitationals	3rd place	
2025	Pre-Season	15th place	
2026	Invitationals	3rd place	
2026	Pre-Season	—	

=== SVL/PVL/V-League ===
Letran Lady Knights
Season	Conference	Title	Ref
2004	1st	5th place	
2004	2nd	3rd place	
2007	1st	8th place	
2007	2nd	8th place	
2012	1st	9th Place	
2013	1st	9th place	
2019	Collegiate	9th place	
2024	Collegiate	6th place	
2025	Collegiate	5th place	

==== PNVF ====
Letran Lady Knights
Season	Conference	Title	Ref
2023	Challenge Cup	3rd place	

== Head coaches ==
Nes Pamilar

== See also ==
- Colegio de San Juan de Letran
- Letran Knights, Lady Knights and Squires
- NCAA volleyball championships
