= Arellano Chiefs volleyball =

Team of Arellano University

Arellano Chiefs
- University: Arellano University
- Nickname: Chiefs
- Location: Manila, Philippines
- Head coach: Bryan Vitug

Main league
- League: NCAA
- Season 100 (2025): (gold) 1st

Championships
- NCAA: 1

The Arellano Chiefs are the collegiate men's varsity volleyball team of the Arellano University. they have been competing at the National Collegiate Athletic Association of the Philippines since 2009.

== History ==
The Arellano University joined the National Collegiate Athletic Association (NCAA) of the Philippines in 2009. It later became a regular member in 2013, ahead of the NCAA Season 89.

They consistently finished in the Final Four. The Chiefs best finish prior to their first ever title was in Season 93 where they lost to the Perpetual Altas in the finals series. Sherwin Meneses has been a long time head coach of Arellano and was fulfilling the role since Arellano's entry to the NCAA in 2009.

In 2025, Meneses was reassigned as team consultant, with his colleague Bryan Vitug named head coach starting the Season 100 The Chiefs won their first men's volleyball title for that year. Mentored by Bryan Vitug, Arellano made a sweep against Letran in two games in the finals. Carl Berdal is also named as the Arellano's first ever NCAA Finals MVP.

== Team honors ==
=== NCAA ===
Arellano Chiefs (partial awards)
Year	Season	Title	Ref
2010-11	86	Runner-up	
2011-12	87	3rd place	
2017-18	93	Runner-up	
2018-19	94	3rd place	
2022-23	98	3rd place	
2024-25	100	Champions	

== Head coaches ==
- Sherwin Meneses (2009–2024)
- Bryan Vitug (2025–)
