= 2025 Shakey's Super League Pre-season Unity Cup =

2025 collegiate volleyball competition

- Duration: September 20, 2025 – November 15, 2025
- Matches: 51
- Teams: 16

Results
- Champions: NU Lady Bulldogs
- Runners-up: UST Golden Tigresses
- Third place: FEU Lady Tamaraws
- Fourth place: Adamson Lady Falcons

Awards
- MVP: Camilla Lamina
- Best OH: Shaina Nitura; Xyza Gula
- Best MB: Minierva Maaya; Margaret Altea
- Best OPP: Regina Jurado
- Best Setter: Camilla Lamina
- Best Libero: Shaira Mae Jardio

SSL Pre-season Unity Cup chronology
- < 2024 2026 >

SSL tournament chronology
- < 2025 National 2026 GVIL >

The 2025 Shakey's Super League Pre-season Unity Cup was the fourth edition of the collegiate volleyball competition organized by the Shakey's Super League and the third and final SSL tournament of 2025. The Shakey’s Super League Preseason Collegiate Championship is shifting to being the SSL Preseason Unity Cup. In celebration of the pizza brand’s 50th anniversary, the SSL introduced the new league name last Sept. 03, 2025. The tournament started on Sept. 20 at the Playtime Filoil Centre featuring 16 teams from the UAAP (6) and the NCAA (10).

The NU Lady Bulldogs entered this tournament as the three-time defending pre-season champions. De La Salle Lady Spikers and UE Lady Warriors are taking a leave of absence from the competition as both squads are still in the process of rebuilding their core following some key departures. It was also announced during the tourney's press conference last Wednesday September 03, 2025 in Buendia, Makati, the tournament will hold an All-Star Weekend featuring past and present collegiate stars.

== Participating teams ==
2025 Shakey's Super League Pre-season Unity Cup
Team	School	Collegiate league
Adamson Lady Falcons	Adamson University	UAAP
Arellano Lady Chiefs	Arellano University	NCAA
Ateneo Blue Eagles	Ateneo de Manila University	UAAP
Benilde Lady Blazers	De La Salle–College of Saint Benilde	NCAA
EAC Lady Generals	Emilio Aguinaldo College	NCAA
FEU Lady Tamaraws	Far Eastern University	UAAP
JRU Lady Bombers	José Rizal University	NCAA
Letran Lady Knights	Colegio de San Juan de Letran	NCAA
Lyceum Lady Pirates	Lyceum of the Philippines University	NCAA
Mapúa Lady Cardinals	Mapúa University	NCAA
NU Lady Bulldogs	National University	UAAP
Perpetual Lady Altas	University of Perpetual Help System DALTA	NCAA
San Beda Lady Red Spikers	San Beda University	NCAA
San Sebastian Lady Stags	San Sebastian College – Recoletos	NCAA
UP Fighting Maroons	University of the Philippines	UAAP
UST Golden Tigresses	University of Santo Tomas	UAAP

== Pool composition ==
The sixteen teams from the UAAP (6) and NCAA (10) will compete in this tournament. The teams are then divided into four pools. Pools A, B, C and D will consist of four teams per pool. The pool composition is as follows:

Pool A	Pool B	Pool C	Pool D
NU Lady Bulldogs	FEU Lady Tamaraws	UST Golden Tigresses	Ateneo Blue Eagles
EAC Lady Generals	Arellano Lady Chiefs	UP Fighting Maroons	Benilde Lady Blazers
San Beda Lady Red Spikers	Adamson Lady Falcons	Mapúa Lady Cardinals	San Sebastian Lady Stags
Lyceum Lady Pirates	JRU Lady Bombers	Letran Lady Knights	Perpetual Lady Altas

== Venues ==
Preliminaries	Preliminaries, Quarterfinals	Preliminaries, Finals	Preliminaries, Quarterfinals	Semifinals
San Juan	Manila	Manila	Malate	Manila
Filoil Centre (FIL)	Paco Arena (PAC)	Rizal Memorial Coliseum (RMC)	San Andres Gym (SAG)	Ninoy Aquino Stadium (NAS)
Capacity: 6,000	Capacity: 1,000	Capacity: 6,100	Capacity: 5,000	Capacity: 6,000
	–			

== Format ==
The format of this year's Preseason Unity Cup will remain unchanged, with its all-to-play rule still intact.

First round

1. Single-round robin format; 4 pools; Teams are ranked using the FIVB Ranking System.
2. The top two teams per pool will advance to the second round.

Second round

1. Single-round robin format; 2 pools; Teams are ranked using the FIVB Ranking System.
2. The W-L record in the first round will be carried over in the second round.
3. After another pool play, the eight teams will battle in the crossover quarterfinals.

Quarterfinals (twice-to-beat)

1. QF1: E1 vs. F4 (E1 twice-to-beat)
2. QF3: F2 vs. E3 (F2 twice-to-beat)
3. QF2: F1 vs. E4 (F1 twice-to-beat)
4. QF4: E2 vs. F3 (E2 twice-to-beat)

Semifinals (twice-to-beat)

1. SF1: QF #1 vs. QF #3
2. SF2: QF #2 vs. QF #4

Finals (Best-of-three series)

1. Bronze medal: SF1 Loser vs SF2 Loser
2. Gold medal: SF1 Winner vs SF2 Winner

== Pool standing procedure ==
- First, teams are ranked by the number of matches won.
- If the number of matches won is tied, the tied teams are then ranked by match points, wherein:
  - Match won 3–0 or 3–1: 3 match points for the winner, 0 match points for the loser.
  - Match won 3–2: 2 match points for the winner, 1 match point for the loser.
- In case of any further ties, the following criteria shall be used:
  - Set ratio: the number of sets won divided by number of sets lost.
  - Point ratio: number of points scored divided by number of points allowed.
  - Head-to-head standings: any remaining tied teams are ranked based on the results of head-to-head matches involving the teams in question.

== First round ==
- All times are Philippine Standard Time (UTC+8:00).
- The top two teams per pool advance to the second round.

=== Pool A ===
Pos	Team	Pld	W	L	Pts	SW	SL	SR	SPW	SPL	SPR	Qualification
1	NU Lady Bulldogs	3	3	0	9	9	0	MAX	225	139	1.619	Second round
2	San Beda Lady Red Spikers	3	2	1	5	6	5	1.200	227	236	0.962	Second round
3	Lyceum Lady Pirates	3	1	2	2	3	8	0.375	217	246	0.882	
4	EAC Lady Generals	3	0	3	2	4	9	0.444	237	285	0.832	

Source: TeamPilipinas.info

Date	Time	Venue		Score		Set 1	Set 2	Set 3	Set 4	Set 5	Total	Report
Sep 20	13:00	FIL	EAC Lady Generals	2–3	San Beda Lady Red Spikers	19–25	25–19	25–20	20–25	10–15	99–104	
Sep 28	14:00	FIL	EAC Lady Generals	0–3	NU Lady Bulldogs	14–25	15–25	14–25			43–75	
Oct 3	14:00	PAC	San Beda Lady Red Spikers	3–0	Lyceum Lady Pirates	26–24	25–18	25–20			76–62	
Oct 5	12:00	PAC	EAC Lady Generals	2–3	Lyceum Lady Pirates	25–23	19–25	25–18	21–25	5–15	95–106	
Oct 9	14:00	RMC	NU Lady Bulldogs	3–0	San Beda Lady Red Spikers	25–9	25–22	25–16			75–47	
Oct 10	14:00	RMC	NU Lady Bulldogs	3–0	Lyceum Lady Pirates	25–13	25–15	25–21			75–49	

=== Pool B ===
Pos	Team	Pld	W	L	Pts	SW	SL	SR	SPW	SPL	SPR	Qualification
1	FEU Lady Tamaraws ^{a}	2	2	0	6	6	0	MAX	150	102	1.471	Second round
2	Adamson Lady Falcons ^{a}	2	2	0	6	6	0	MAX	150	108	1.389	Second round
3	Arellano Lady Chiefs	3	1	2	2	3	8	0.375	216	247	0.874	
4	JRU Lady Bombers	3	0	3	1	2	9	0.222	195	254	0.768	

Source: TeamPilipinas.info

Date	Time	Venue		Score		Set 1	Set 2	Set 3	Set 4	Set 5	Total	Report
Sep 20	15:00	FIL	FEU Lady Tamaraws	3–0	JRU Lady Bombers	25–15	25–9	25–23			75–47	
Sep 21	10:00	FIL	Arellano Lady Chiefs	3–2	JRU Lady Bombers	25–19	25–18	23–25	16–25	15–10	104–97	
Sep 27	12:00	FIL	Arellano Lady Chiefs	0–3	FEU Lady Tamaraws	22–25	17–25	16–25			55–75	
Oct 5	14:00	PAC	JRU Lady Bombers	0–3	Adamson Lady Falcons	17–25	18–25	16–25			51–75	
Oct 9	10:00	RMC	Adamson Lady Falcons	3–0	Arellano Lady Chiefs	25–21	25–17	25–19			75–57	
Oct 10	16:00	RMC	FEU Lady Tamaraws	–	Adamson Lady Falcons	–	–	–			0–0	

Note
a. Adamson Lady Falcons and FEU Lady Tamaraws have mutually decided to forfeit their match scheduled October 10, 2025, in the ongoing Shakey's Super League (SSL) Unity Cup. Both have secured their spots in Round 2. Both teams currently have 2 wins, 0 losses, 6 game points, 6 sets won and 0 sets lost. To break the tie, the point quotient will serve as the basis: Far Eastern University (FEU): 1.4706 -> (150 points scored ÷ 102 opponent points) Adamson University (Adu): 1.3889 -> (150 points scored ÷ 108 opponent points) With this, FEU secures the highest point quotient and shall be ranked as #1 and Adamson shall be ranked as #2 in Pool B.

=== Pool C ===
Pos	Team	Pld	W	L	Pts	SW	SL	SR	SPW	SPL	SPR	Qualification
1	UP Fighting Maroons	3	3	0	7	9	4	2.250	276	268	1.030	Second round
2	UST Golden Tigresses	3	2	1	7	8	4	2.000	276	240	1.150	Second round
3	Mapúa Lady Cardinals	3	1	2	3	5	8	0.625	262	292	0.897	
4	Letran Lady Knights	3	0	3	1	3	9	0.333	247	271	0.911	

Source: TeamPilipinas.info

Date	Time	Venue		Score		Set 1	Set 2	Set 3	Set 4	Set 5	Total	Report
Sep 21	12:00	FIL	UST Golden Tigresses	2–3	UP Fighting Maroons	22–25	25–18	19–25	25–18	13–15	104–101	
Sep 28	12:00	FIL	Letran Lady Knights	1–3	UST Golden Tigresses	16–25	25–22	23–25	17–25		81–97	
Sep 28	16:00	FIL	UP Fighting Maroons	3–2	Mapúa Lady Cardinals	25–22	25–20	22–25	23–25	15–13	110–105	
Oct 3	16:00	PAC	Mapúa Lady Cardinals	3–2	Letran Lady Knights	25–19	12–25	20–25	26–24	16–14	99–107	
Oct 9	16:00	RMC	UST Golden Tigresses	3–0	Mapúa Lady Cardinals	25–19	25–17	25–22			75–58	
Oct 10	10:00	RMC	Letran Lady Knights	0–3	UP Fighting Maroons	22–25	18–25	19–25			59–75	

=== Pool D ===
Pos	Team	Pld	W	L	Pts	SW	SL	SR	SPW	SPL	SPR	Qualification
1	Benilde Lady Blazers	3	3	0	9	9	1	9.000	255	215	1.186	Second round
2	Ateneo Blue Eagles	3	1	2	4	6	6	1.000	263	262	1.004	Second round
3	Perpetual Lady Altas	3	1	2	3	3	7	0.429	230	267	0.861	
4	San Sebastian Lady Stags	3	1	2	2	4	8	0.500	261	285	0.916	

Source: TeamPilipinas.info

Date	Time	Venue		Score		Set 1	Set 2	Set 3	Set 4	Set 5	Total	Report
Sep 20	17:00	FIL	San Sebastian Lady Stags	1–3	Perpetual Lady Altas	32–30	16–25	16–25	18–25		82–105	
Sep 27	14:00	FIL	Perpetual Lady Altas	0–3	Ateneo Blue Eagles	16–25	24–26	17–25			57–76	
Oct 3	12:00	PAC	Benilde Lady Blazers	3–0	San Sebastian Lady Stags	25–17	25–20	25–18			75–55	
Oct 5	10:00	PAC	Benilde Lady Blazers	3–0	Perpetual Lady Altas	28–26	26–24	25–18			79–68	
Oct 9	12:00	RMC	Benilde Lady Blazers	3–1	Ateneo Blue Eagles	18–25	25–13	25–23	33–31		101–92	
Oct 10	12:00	RMC	Ateneo Blue Eagles	2–3	San Sebastian Lady Stags	25–19	25–20	17–25	20–25	8–15	95–104	

== Second round ==
- All times are Philippine Standard Time (UTC+8:00).

=== Pool E ===
Pos	Team	Pld	W	L	Pts	SW	SL	SR	SPW	SPL	SPR	Qualification
1	NU Lady Bulldogs	3	3	0	8	9	3	3.000	288	241	1.195	Quarterfinals with twice-to-beat advantage
2	Adamson Lady Falcons	3	2	1	7	8	4	2.000	281	252	1.115	Quarterfinals with twice-to-beat advantage
3	UP Fighting Maroons	3	1	2	3	4	6	0.667	216	221	0.977	Quarterfinals
4	Ateneo Blue Eagles	3	0	3	0	1	9	0.111	176	247	0.713	Quarterfinals

Source: TeamPilipinas.info

Date	Time	Venue		Score		Set 1	Set 2	Set 3	Set 4	Set 5	Total	Report
Oct 11	12:00	RMC	Adamson Lady Falcons	2–3	NU Lady Bulldogs	31–29	22–25	25–21	21–25	10–15	109–115	
Oct 12	12:00	RMC	UP Fighting Maroons	1–3	NU Lady Bulldogs	20–25	25–23	13–25	18–25		76–98	
Oct 12	14:00	RMC	Ateneo Blue Eagles	1–3	Adamson Lady Falcons	13–25	19–25	25–22	15–25		72–97	
Oct 15	10:00	SAG	UP Fighting Maroons	0–3	Adamson Lady Falcons	20–25	22–25	23–25			65–75	
Oct 15	12:00	SAG	NU Lady Bulldogs	3–0	Ateneo Blue Eagles	25–22	25–17	25–17			75–56	
Oct 17	12:00	SAG	Ateneo Blue Eagles	0–3	UP Fighting Maroons	19–25	15–25	14–25			48–75	

=== Pool F ===
Pos	Team	Pld	W	L	Pts	SW	SL	SR	SPW	SPL	SPR	Qualification
1	UST Golden Tigresses	3	3	0	9	9	0	MAX	225	158	1.424	Quarterfinals with twice-to-beat advantage
2	FEU Lady Tamaraws	3	2	1	6	6	5	1.200	243	247	0.984	Quarterfinals with twice-to-beat advantage
3	Benilde Lady Blazers	3	1	2	3	4	7	0.571	244	252	0.968	Quarterfinals
4	San Beda Lady Red Spikers	3	0	3	0	2	9	0.222	211	266	0.793	Quarterfinals

Source: TeamPilipinas.info

Date	Time	Venue		Score		Set 1	Set 2	Set 3	Set 4	Set 5	Total	Report
Oct 11	14:00	RMC	Benilde Lady Blazers	3–1	San Beda Lady Red Spikers	25–23	18–25	25–11	25–22		93–81	
Oct 11	16:00	RMC	UST Golden Tigresses	3–0	FEU Lady Tamaraws	25–16	25–18	25–15			75–49	
Oct 12	16:00	RMC	Benilde Lady Blazers	0–3	UST Golden Tigresses	19–25	20–25	23–25			62–75	
Oct 15	14:00	SAG	San Beda Lady Red Spikers	1–3	FEU Lady Tamaraws	25–23	23–25	15–25	20–25		83–98	
Oct 17	14:00	SAG	FEU Lady Tamaraws	3–1	Benilde Lady Blazers	25–21	25–20	21–25	25–23		96–89	
Oct 17	16:00	SAG	San Beda Lady Red Spikers	0–3	UST Golden Tigresses	21–25	9–25	17–25			47–75	

== Final round ==
- All times are Philippine Standard Time (UTC+8:00).

5th place match (Single-elimination)
November 8
UP Fighting Maroons	3
Ateneo Blue Eagles	1
7th place match
November 8
San Beda Lady Red Spikers	0
Benilde Lady Blazers	3

5th–8th semifinals (Single-elimination)
October 26
San Beda Lady Red Spikers	0
UP Fighting Maroons	3
October 26
Ateneo Blue Eagles	3
Benilde Lady Blazers	1

Quarterfinals (#1 and #2 with twice-to-beat advantage)
October 21
E1	NU Lady Bulldogs	3
F4	San Beda Lady Red Spikers	1
October 21–24
F2	FEU Lady Tamaraws	1	3
E3	UP Fighting Maroons	3	1
October 21
F1	UST Golden Tigresses	3
E4	Ateneo Blue Eagles	0
October 21–24
E2	Adamson Lady Falcons	2	3
F3	Benilde Lady Blazers	3	1

Semifinals (NU & UST with twice-to-beat advantage)
October 26
NU Lady Bulldogs	3
FEU Lady Tamaraws	0
October 26
UST Golden Tigresses	3
Adamson Lady Falcons	0

Championship (Best-of-three series)
November 8–15
NU Lady Bulldogs	3	3
UST Golden Tigresses	2	2
3rd place match
November 15
FEU Lady Tamaraws	3
Adamson Lady Falcons	1

=== Quarterfinals ===
Date	Time	Venue		Score		Set 1	Set 2	Set 3	Set 4	Set 5	Total	Report
Oct 21	10:00	SAG	NU Lady Bulldogs	3–1	San Beda Lady Red Spikers	26–24	25–27	25–18	25–16		101–85	
Oct 21	12:00	SAG	UST Golden Tigresses	3–0	Ateneo Blue Eagles	25–16	25–21	25–21			75–58	
Oct 21	14:00	SAG	Adamson Lady Falcons	2–3	Benilde Lady Blazers	26–28	25–20	15–25	25–19	12–15	103–107	
Oct 21	16:00	SAG	FEU Lady Tamaraws	1–3	UP Fighting Maroons	25–27	25–21	18–25	20–25		88–98	
Oct 24	15:00	PAC	Benilde Lady Blazers	1–3	Adamson Lady Falcons	18–25	25–15	16–25	22–25		81–90	
Oct 24	17:00	PAC	UP Fighting Maroons	1–3	FEU Lady Tamaraws	24–26	25–22	18–25	24–26		91–99	

=== 5th–8th semifinals ===
Date	Time	Venue		Score		Set 1	Set 2	Set 3	Set 4	Set 5	Total	Report
Oct 26	10:00	NAS	San Beda Lady Red Spikers	0–3	UP Fighting Maroons	24–26	23–25	22–25			69–76	
Oct 26	12:00	NAS	Ateneo Blue Eagles	3–1	Benilde Lady Blazers	25–18	25–11	24–26	25–16		99–71	

=== Semifinals ===
Date	Time	Venue		Score		Set 1	Set 2	Set 3	Set 4	Set 5	Total	Report
Oct 26	15:00	NAS	NU Lady Bulldogs	3–0	FEU Lady Tamaraws	25–20	27–25	25–21			77–66	
Oct 26	17:00	NAS	UST Golden Tigresses	3–0	Adamson Lady Falcons	25–22	25–22	25–20			75–64	

=== 7th place match ===
Date	Time	Venue		Score		Set 1	Set 2	Set 3	Set 4	Set 5	Total	Report
Nov 8	10:00	RMC	San Beda Lady Red Spikers	0–3	Benilde Lady Blazers	10–25	20–25	14–25			44–75	

=== 5th place match ===
Date	Time	Venue		Score		Set 1	Set 2	Set 3	Set 4	Set 5	Total	Report
Nov 8	13:00	RMC	UP Fighting Maroons	3–1	Ateneo Blue Eagles	23–25	25–16	25–23	25–16		98–80	

=== Bronze medal match ===
Date	Time	Venue		Score		Set 1	Set 2	Set 3	Set 4	Set 5	Total	Report
Nov 15	13:00	RMC	FEU Lady Tamaraws	3–1	Adamson Lady Falcons	25–22	17–25	25–19	25–20		92–86	

=== Gold medal match ===
Date	Time	Venue		Score		Set 1	Set 2	Set 3	Set 4	Set 5	Total	Report
Nov 8	16:00	RMC	NU Lady Bulldogs	3–2	UST Golden Tigresses	15–25	25–23	25–17	13–25	15–12	93–102	
Nov 15	15:30	RMC	UST Golden Tigresses	2–3	NU Lady Bulldogs	25–22	22–25	27–25	23–25	10–15	107–112	

== Final standing ==
Rank	Team
1st place, gold medalist(s)	NU Lady Bulldogs
2nd place, silver medalist(s)	UST Golden Tigresses
3rd place, bronze medalist(s)	FEU Lady Tamaraws
4	Adamson Lady Falcons
5	UP Fighting Maroons
6	Ateneo Blue Eagles
7	Benilde Lady Blazers
8	San Beda Lady Red Spikers
9	Mapúa Lady Cardinals
10	Perpetual Lady Altas
11	San Sebastian Lady Stags
12	Lyceum Lady Pirates
13	Arellano Lady Chiefs
14	EAC Lady Generals
15	Letran Lady Knights
16	JRU Lady Bombers

2025 Shakey's Super League Pre-season Unity Cup champions
NU Lady Bulldogs
4th title

Team Roster
Evangeline Alinsug (c), Camilla Lamina, Shaira Mae Jardio, Alexa Mata, Minierva Maaya, Arah Ellah Panique, Nataszha Kaye Bombita, Chaitlin Mauricio, Abegail Pono, Aishat Bello, IC Cepada, Josline Salazar, Celine Marsh, Myrtle Escanlar, Jenelyn Jacob, Lyzel Dela Peña, Samantha Cantada, Harlyn Serneche, Denesse Daylisan, Rashel Bajamonde
Head coach
Regine Diego

== Awards and medalists ==
=== Individual awards ===
Award	Player	Team	Ref.
Most Valuable Player	Camilla Lamina	NU Lady Bulldogs	
1st Best Outside Spiker	Shaina Nitura	Adamson Lady Falcons	
2nd Best Outside Spiker	Xyza Gula	UST Golden Tigresses	
1st Best Middle Blocker	Minierva Maaya	NU Lady Bulldogs	
2nd Best Middle Blocker	Margaret Altea	UST Golden Tigresses	
Best Opposite Spiker	Regina Jurado	UST Golden Tigresses	
Best Setter	Camilla Lamina	NU Lady Bulldogs	
Best Libero	Shaira Mae Jardio	NU Lady Bulldogs	

=== Medalists ===
Gold	Silver	Bronze
NU Lady Bulldogs: Evangeline Alinsug (c); Camilla Lamina; Shaira Mae Jardio; Alexa Mata; Minierva Maaya; Arah Ellah Panique; Nataszha Kaye Bombita; Chaitlin Mauricio; Abegail Pono; Aishat Bello; IC Cepada; Josline Salazar; Celine Marsh; Myrtle Escanlar; Jenelyn Jacob; Lyzel Dela Peña; Samantha Cantada; Harlyn Serneche; Denesse Daylisan; Rashel Bajamonde Head coach: Regine Diego	UST Golden Tigresses: Ma. Bernadett Pepito (c); Angeline Poyos; Xyza Rufel Gula; Ma. Cassandra Rae Carballo; Regina Grace Jurado; Mary Margaret Banagua; Mary Joe Coronado; Kyla Elvi Cordora; Alessia Gutierrez; Stephanie Bien Arasan; Avril Denise Bron; Kaizah Huyno; Margaret Altea; Mishka Fernandez; Julia Balingit; Lianne Penuliar; Sandrine Escober; Arlene Waje; Guen Angela Silang; Blessing Unekwe Head coach: Shaq Delos Santos	FEU Lady Tamaraws: Christine Ubaldo (c); Faida Bakanke; Kyle Pendon; Ann Roselle Asis; Lovely Rose Lopez; Mitzi Panangin; Patricia Leanne Jan Arciaga; Clarisse Loresco; Karyll Miranda; Frenchie Premaylon; Alyzza Gaile Devosora; Mary Karylle Suplico; Gerzel Mary Petallo; Christine Dominique Ramos; Margarett Louise Encarnacion; Mhyne Venizze Escote; Audrey Izshca Santos; Dreianne Durola; Jazlyn Anne Ellarina; Ia Madane David; Ma. Venice Audrei Pagayanan Head coach: Tina Salak
