= 2026 Shakey's Super League Unity Cup =

2026 collegiate volleyball competition

- Duration: September 25, 2026 – TBA
- Teams: 17

SSL Unity Cup chronology
- < 2025 2027 >

SSL tournament chronology
- < 2026 National 2027 GVIL >

The 2026 Shakey's Super League Unity Cup will be the fifth edition of the collegiate volleyball competition organized by the Shakey's Super League and the third and final SSL tournament of 2026. The tournament will start on Sept. 25 at the Rizal Memorial Coliseum featuring 17 teams from the UAAP (7) and the NCAA (10).

The NU Lady Bulldogs entered this tournament as the four-time defending pre-season champions. De La Salle Lady Spikers will take another leave of absence due to injuries to some of its key players while the UE Lady Warriors makes a comeback after skipping last year's edition.

== Participating teams ==
Team	School	Collegiate league
Adamson Lady Falcons	Adamson University	UAAP
Arellano Lady Chiefs	Arellano University	NCAA
Ateneo Blue Eagles	Ateneo de Manila University	UAAP
Benilde Lady Blazers	De La Salle–College of Saint Benilde	NCAA
EAC Lady Generals	Emilio Aguinaldo College	NCAA
FEU Lady Tamaraws	Far Eastern University	UAAP
JRU Lady Bombers	José Rizal University	NCAA
Letran Lady Knights	Colegio de San Juan de Letran	NCAA
Lyceum Lady Pirates	Lyceum of the Philippines University	NCAA
Mapúa Lady Cardinals	Mapúa University	NCAA
NU Lady Bulldogs	National University	UAAP
Perpetual Lady Altas	University of Perpetual Help System DALTA	NCAA
San Beda Lady Red Spikers	San Beda University	NCAA
San Sebastian Lady Stags	San Sebastian College – Recoletos	NCAA
UE Lady Red Warriors	University of the East	UAAP
UP Fighting Maroons	University of the Philippines	UAAP
UST Golden Tigresses	University of Santo Tomas	UAAP

== Pool composition ==
The seventeen teams from the UAAP (7) and NCAA (10) will compete in this tournament. The teams are then divided into four pools. Pools A, B, C and D will consist of four teams per pool. The pool composition is as follows:

Pool A	Pool B	Pool C	Pool D
NU Lady Bulldogs	UST Golden Tigresses	FEU Lady Tamaraws	Adamson Lady Falcons
Arellano Lady Chiefs	Benilde Lady Blazers	Ateneo Blue Eagles	Lyceum Lady Pirates
Letran Lady Knights	JRU Lady Bombers	EAC Lady Generals	UE Lady Red Warriors
Perpetual Lady Altas	Mapúa Lady Cardinals	San Sebastian Lady Stags	UP Fighting Maroons
San Beda Lady Red Spikers	—N/a		

== Venues ==
Preliminaries
Manila
Rizal Memorial Coliseum (RMC)
Capacity: 6,100
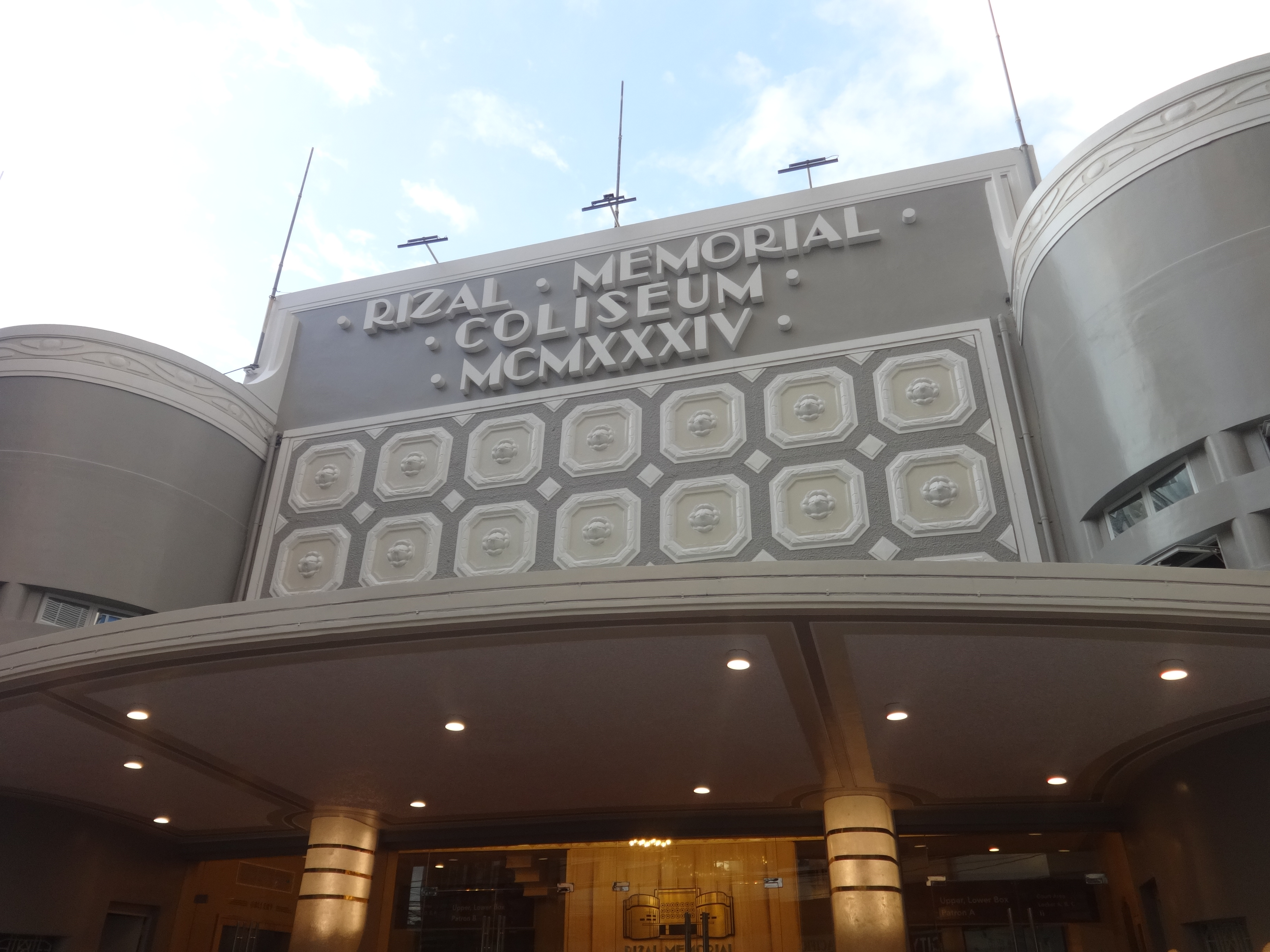

== Format ==
The format of this year's Unity Cup will remain unchanged, with its all-to-play rule still intact.

First round

1. Single-round robin format; 4 pools; Teams are ranked using the FIVB Ranking System.
2. The top two teams per pool will advance to the second round.

Second round

1. Single-round robin format; 2 pools; Teams are ranked using the FIVB Ranking System.
2. The W-L record in the first round will be carried over in the second round.
3. After another pool play, the eight teams will battle in the crossover quarterfinals.

Quarterfinals (twice-to-beat)

1. QF1: E1 vs. F4 (E1 twice-to-beat)
2. QF3: F2 vs. E3 (F2 twice-to-beat)
3. QF2: F1 vs. E4 (F1 twice-to-beat)
4. QF4: E2 vs. F3 (E2 twice-to-beat)

Semifinals (knockout stage)

1. SF1: QF #1 vs. QF #3
2. SF2: QF #2 vs. QF #4

Finals

1. Bronze medal match (knockout stage)

SF1 Loser vs SF2 Loser

1. Gold medal match (Best-of-three series)

SF1 Winner vs SF2 Winner

== Pool standing procedure ==
- First, teams are ranked by the number of matches won.
- If the number of matches won is tied, the tied teams are then ranked by match points, wherein:
  - Match won 3–0 or 3–1: 3 match points for the winner, 0 match points for the loser.
  - Match won 3–2: 2 match points for the winner, 1 match point for the loser.
- In case of any further ties, the following criteria shall be used:
  - Set ratio: the number of sets won divided by number of sets lost.
  - Point ratio: number of points scored divided by number of points allowed.
  - Head-to-head standings: any remaining tied teams are ranked based on the results of head-to-head matches involving the teams in question.

== First round ==
- All times are Philippine Standard Time (UTC+8:00).
- The top two teams per pool advance to the second round.

=== Pool A ===
Pos	Team	Pld	W	L	Pts	SW	SL	SR	SPW	SPL	SPR	Qualification
1	NU Lady Bulldogs	4	4	0	12	12	0	MAX	300	188	1.596	Second round
2	Letran Lady Knights	4	3	1	9	9	4	2.250	297	268	1.108	Second round
3	San Beda Lady Red Spikers	4	1	3	4	5	10	0.500	311	353	0.881	
4	Arellano Lady Chiefs	4	1	3	3	5	10	0.500	306	356	0.860	
5	Perpetual Lady Altas	4	1	3	2	5	11	0.455	304	353	0.861	

Source: TeamPilipinas.info

Date	Time	Venue		Score		Set 1	Set 2	Set 3	Set 4	Set 5	Total	Report
Sep 25	17:00	RMC	Arellano Lady Chiefs	3–1	Perpetual Lady Altas	23–25	25–23	25–19	25–23		98–90	
Sep 26	17:00	RMC	San Beda Lady Red Spikers	0–3	NU Lady Bulldogs	14–25	19–25	18–25			51–75	
Sep 27	15:00	RMC	Letran Lady Knights	3–1	Arellano Lady Chiefs	25–19	18–25	25–18	25–18		93–80	
Oct 9	15:00	RMC	NU Lady Bulldogs	3–0	Letran Lady Knights	25–21	25–14	25–19			75–54	
Oct 10	13:00	RMC	Arellano Lady Chiefs	0–3	NU Lady Bulldogs	12–25	16–25	14–25			42–75	
Oct 11	13:00	RMC	Perpetual Lady Altas	3–2	San Beda Lady Red Spikers	28–30	25–19	23–25	25–17	16–14	117–105	
Oct 16	13:00	RMC	Letran Lady Knights	3–0	San Beda Lady Red Spikers	25–22	25–14	25–21			75–57	
Oct 16	17:00	RMC	NU Lady Bulldogs	3–0	Perpetual Lady Altas	25–13	25–13	25–15			75–41	
Oct 18	11:00	RMC	Arellano Lady Chiefs	1–3	San Beda Lady Red Spikers	25–23	19–25	19–25	23–25		86–98	
Oct 18	15:00	RMC	Perpetual Lady Altas	0–3	Letran Lady Knights	18–25	22–25	16–25			56–75	

=== Pool B ===
Pos	Team	Pld	W	L	Pts	SW	SL	SR	SPW	SPL	SPR	Qualification
1	UST Golden Tigresses	3	3	0	9	9	0	MAX	225	156	1.442	Second round
2	Benilde Lady Blazers	3	2	1	6	6	4	1.500	222	219	1.014	Second round
3	Mapúa Lady Cardinals	3	1	2	3	4	6	0.667	186	206	0.903	
4	JRU Lady Bombers	3	0	3	0	1	9	0.111	244	246	0.992	

Source: TeamPilipinas.info

Date	Time	Venue		Score		Set 1	Set 2	Set 3	Set 4	Set 5	Total	Report
Sep 25	15:00	RMC	Mapúa Lady Cardinals	3–0	JRU Lady Bombers	25–21	25–14	25–21			75–56	
Sep 26	13:00	RMC	Benilde Lady Blazers	0–3	UST Golden Tigresses	21–25	12–25	18–25			51–75	
Oct 10	15:00	RMC	UST Golden Tigresses	3–0	Mapúa Lady Cardinals	25–15	25–20	25–21			75–56	
Oct 16	15:00	RMC	JRU Lady Bombers	1–3	Benilde Lady Blazers	26–28	16–25	25–18	22–25		89–96	
Oct 18	13:00	RMC	Mapúa Lady Cardinals	0–3	Benilde Lady Blazers	21–25	14–25	20–25			55–75	
Oct 18	17:00	RMC	JRU Lady Bombers	0–3	UST Golden Tigresses	15–25	20–25	14–25			49–75	

=== Pool C ===
Pos	Team	Pld	W	L	Pts	SW	SL	SR	SPW	SPL	SPR	Qualification
1	FEU Lady Tamaraws	3	3	0	8	9	2	4.500	259	178	1.455	Second round
2	Ateneo Blue Eagles	3	2	1	6	6	5	1.200	229	213	1.075	Second round
3	San Sebastian Lady Stags	3	1	2	2	4	8	0.500	220	274	0.803	
4	EAC Lady Generals	3	0	3	2	5	9	0.556	256	299	0.856	

Source: TeamPilipinas.info

Date	Time	Venue		Score		Set 1	Set 2	Set 3	Set 4	Set 5	Total	Report
Sep 26	15:00	RMC	FEU Lady Tamaraws	3–0	Ateneo Blue Eagles	25–20	25–13	25–12			75–45	
Sep 27	13:00	RMC	EAC Lady Generals	2–3	San Sebastian Lady Stags	25–16	25–18	25–27	23–25	6–15	104–101	
Oct 9	13:00	RMC	San Sebastian Lady Stags	0–3	FEU Lady Tamaraws	14–25	16–25	21–25			51–75	
Oct 11	17:00	RMC	Ateneo Blue Eagles	3–1	EAC Lady Generals	25–12	14–25	25–19	25–14		89–70	
Oct 17	13:00	RMC	FEU Lady Tamaraws	3–2	EAC Lady Generals	20–25	25–13	24–26	25–12	15–6	109–82	
Oct 17	15:00	RMC	Ateneo Blue Eagles	3–1	San Sebastian Lady Stags	25–16	25–15	20–25	25–12		95–68	

=== Pool D ===
Pos	Team	Pld	W	L	Pts	SW	SL	SR	SPW	SPL	SPR	Qualification
1	UP Fighting Maroons	3	3	0	9	9	1	9.000	246	199	1.236	Second round
2	Adamson Lady Falcons	3	2	1	6	6	4	1.500	240	224	1.071	Second round
3	Lyceum Lady Pirates	3	1	2	2	4	8	0.500	255	272	0.938	
4	UE Lady Red Warriors	3	0	3	1	3	9	0.333	248	277	0.895	

Source: TeamPilipinas.info

Date	Time	Venue		Score		Set 1	Set 2	Set 3	Set 4	Set 5	Total	Report
Sep 25	13:00	RMC	Lyceum Lady Pirates	0–3	Adamson Lady Falcons	27–29	21–25	18–25			66–79	
Sep 27	17:00	RMC	UE Lady Red Warriors	2–3	Lyceum Lady Pirates	22–25	26–24	26–24	12–25	13–15	99–113	
Oct 9	17:00	RMC	UE Lady Red Warriors	0–3	UP Fighting Maroons	19–25	25–27	17–25			61–77	
Oct 10	17:00	RMC	UP Fighting Maroons	3–0	Adamson Lady Falcons	25–23	25–19	25–20			75–62	
Oct 11	15:00	RMC	Adamson Lady Falcons	3–1	UE Lady Red Warriors	25–15	25–22	24–26	25–20		99–83	
Oct 17	17:00	RMC	UP Fighting Maroons	3–1	Lyceum Lady Pirates	19–25	25–17	25–15	25–19		94–76	

== Second round ==
- All times are Philippine Standard Time (UTC+8:00).

=== Pool E ===
Pos	Team	Pld	W	L	Pts	SW	SL	SR	SPW	SPL	SPR	Qualification
1	NU Lady Bulldogs	3	3	0	9	9	2	4.500	272	210	1.295	Quarterfinals with twice-to-beat advantage
2	FEU Lady Tamaraws	3	2	1	6	7	3	2.333	231	185	1.249	Quarterfinals with twice-to-beat advantage
3	Adamson Lady Falcons	3	1	2	3	4	6	0.667	205	228	0.899	Quarterfinals
4	Benilde Lady Blazers	3	0	3	0	0	9	0.000	151	226	0.668	Quarterfinals

Source: TeamPilipinas.info

Date	Time	Venue		Score		Set 1	Set 2	Set 3	Set 4	Set 5	Total	Report
Oct 25	15:00	ISP	Benilde Lady Blazers	0–3	NU Lady Bulldogs	20–25	16–25	15–25			51–75	
Oct 25	17:00	ISP	Adamson Lady Falcons	0–3	FEU Lady Tamaraws	16–25	15–25	20–25			51–75	
Oct 28	11:00	NAS	FEU Lady Tamaraws	3–0	Benilde Lady Blazers	25–14	25–9	25–17			75–40	
Oct 28	15:00	NAS	NU Lady Bulldogs	3–1	Adamson Lady Falcons	18–25	25–19	25–12	25–22		93–78	
Nov 7	11:00	PFC	Adamson Lady Falcons	3–0	Benilde Lady Blazers	26–24	25–15	25–21			76–60	
Nov 7	15:00	PFC	FEU Lady Tamaraws	1–3	NU Lady Bulldogs	21–25	19–25	25–19	16–25		81–94	

=== Pool F ===
Pos	Team	Pld	W	L	Pts	SW	SL	SR	SPW	SPL	SPR	Qualification
1	UST Golden Tigresses	3	3	0	9	9	2	4.500	272	204	1.333	Quarterfinals with twice-to-beat advantage
2	Ateneo Blue Eagles	3	1	2	4	6	6	1.000	268	275	0.975	Quarterfinals with twice-to-beat advantage
3	UP Fighting Maroons	3	1	2	3	4	7	0.571	228	261	0.874	Quarterfinals
4	Letran Lady Knights	3	1	2	2	4	8	0.500	254	282	0.901	Quarterfinals

Source: TeamPilipinas.info

Date	Time	Venue		Score		Set 1	Set 2	Set 3	Set 4	Set 5	Total	Report
Oct 25	11:00	ISP	UP Fighting Maroons	3–1	Letran Lady Knights	21–25	25–22	25–22	25–16		96–85	
Oct 25	13:00	ISP	Ateneo Blue Eagles	1–3	UST Golden Tigresses	16–25	20–25	25–21	21–25		82–96	
Oct 28	13:00	NAS	Letran Lady Knights	3–2	Ateneo Blue Eagles	30–32	22–25	25–17	26–24	15–13	118–111	
Oct 28	17:00	NAS	UST Golden Tigresses	3–1	UP Fighting Maroons	26–28	25–15	25–17	25–11		101–71	
Nov 7	13:00	PFC	Letran Lady Knights	0–3	UST Golden Tigresses	11–25	19–25	21–25			51–75	
Nov 7	17:00	PFC	UP Fighting Maroons	0–3	Ateneo Blue Eagles	19–25	22–25	20–25			61–75	

== Combined ranking ==
=== Pool E ===
Pos	Team	Pld	W	L	Pts	SW	SL	SR	SPW	SPL	SPR	Qualification
1	NU Lady Bulldogs	6	6	0	18	18	2	9.000	347	357	0.972	Quarterfinals with twice-to-beat advantage
2	FEU Lady Tamaraws	6	5	1	14	16	5	3.200	490	363	1.350	Quarterfinals with twice-to-beat advantage
3	Adamson Lady Falcons	6	3	3	9	10	10	1.000	445	452	0.985	Quarterfinals
4	Benilde Lady Blazers	6	2	4	6	6	13	0.462	373	445	0.838	Quarterfinals

Source: TeamPilipinas.info

=== Pool F ===
Pos	Team	Pld	W	L	Pts	SW	SL	SR	SPW	SPL	SPR	Qualification
1	UST Golden Tigresses	6	6	0	18	18	2	9.000	497	360	1.381	Quarterfinals with twice-to-beat advantage
2	UP Fighting Maroons	6	4	2	12	13	8	1.625	474	460	1.030	Quarterfinals with twice-to-beat advantage
3	Ateneo Blue Eagles	6	3	3	10	12	11	1.091	497	488	1.018	Quarterfinals
4	Letran Lady Knights	6	3	3	8	10	12	0.833	476	494	0.964	Quarterfinals

Source: TeamPilipinas.info

== Final round ==
- All times are Philippine Standard Time (UTC+8:00).

5th place match (Single-elimination)
7th place match

5th–8th semifinals (Single-elimination)
Letran Lady Knights
UP Fighting Maroons
Benilde Lady Blazers
Ateneo Blue Eagles

Quarterfinals (#1 and #2 with twice-to-beat advantage)
November 14
E1	NU Lady Bulldogs	3
F4	Letran Lady Knights	1
November 14–15
F2	UP Fighting Maroons	0	1
E3	Adamson Lady Falcons	3	3
November 14
F1	UST Golden Tigresses	3
E4	Benilde Lady Blazers	0
November 14
E2	FEU Lady Tamaraws	3
F3	Ateneo Blue Eagles	1

Semifinals (knockout stage)
November 21
NU Lady Bulldogs	1
Adamson Lady Falcons	3
November 21
UST Golden Tigresses	1
FEU Lady Tamaraws	3

Championship (Best-of-three series)
Adamson Lady Falcons
FEU Lady Tamaraws
3rd place match
NU Lady Bulldogs
UST olden Tigresses

=== Quarterfinals ===
Date	Time	Venue		Score		Set 1	Set 2	Set 3	Set 4	Set 5	Total	Report
Nov 14	11:00	MSC	UP Fighting Maroons	0–3	Adamson Lady Falcons	20–25	17–25	24–26			61–76	
Nov 14	13:00	MSC	FEU Lady Tamaraws	3–1	Ateneo Blue Eagles	25–18	19–25	25–15	25–13		94–71	
Nov 14	15:00	MSC	UST Golden Tigresses	3–0	Benilde Lady Blazers	25–17	25–15	25–13			75–45	
Nov 14	17:00	MSC	NU Lady Bulldogs	3–1	Letran Lady Knights	25–18	25–15	23–25	25–19		98–77	
Nov 15	15:00	MSC	Adamson Lady Falcons	3–1	UP Fighting Maroons	25–19	22–25	25–7	25–16		97–67	

=== Semifinals ===
Date	Time	Venue		Score		Set 1	Set 2	Set 3	Set 4	Set 5	Total	Report
Nov 21	15:00	NAS	NU Lady Bulldogs	1–3	Adamson Lady Falcons	26–24	26–28	23–25	20–25		95–102	
Nov 21	17:00	NAS	UST Golden Tigresses	1–3	FEU Lady Tamaraws	17–25	25–21	21–25	19–25		82–96	

== Final standing ==
Rank	Team
1st place, gold medalist(s)	
2nd place, silver medalist(s)	
3rd place, bronze medalist(s)	
4	
5	
6	
7	
8	
9	San Beda Lady Red Spikers
10	Mapúa Lady Cardinals
11	Arellano Lady Chiefs
12	Lyceum Lady Pirates
13	San Sebastian Lady Stags
14	Perpetual Lady Altas
15	EAC Lady Generals
16	UE Lady Red Warriors
17	JRU Lady Bombers

2026 Shakey's Super League Unity Cup champions
? title

Team Roster
Head coach

== Awards and medalists ==
=== Individual awards ===
Award	Player	Team	Ref.
Most Valuable Player			
1st Best Outside Spiker			
2nd Best Outside Spiker			
1st Best Middle Blocker			
2nd Best Middle Blocker			
Best Opposite Spiker			
Best Setter			
Best Libero			

=== Medalists ===
Gold	Silver	Bronze
