= Shaq Delos Santos =

Filipino volleyball coach

Personal information
- Nationality: Filipino

Coaching information
- Current team: University of Santo Tomas (women); Philippines (women)
- Previous teams coached
- Years: Teams
- 2008-2011 2011–2017 2016–2019 2018–2021 2020–2026 2022–2023 2025– 2026–: University of Santo Tomas (women); Far Eastern University; Petron Blaze Spikers; Philippines (women); Cignal HD Spikers (women); University of the Philippines (women); University of Santo Tomas (women); Philippines (women)

Cesael "Shaq" Delos Santos is a Filipino volleyball coach who was head coach of the Cignal HD Spikers of the Premier Volleyball League.

== Education ==
Delos Santos attended the Far Eastern University (FEU).

== Career ==
=== College ===
Delos Santos worked as an assistant coach for the University of Santo Tomas (UST) Golden Tigresses. He became head coach in 2008, after coach August Santamaria suffered from a mild stroke. and won a championship in 2010. He did not renew his contract with UST and left to coach for his alma mater.

Delos Santos coached the FEU women's team to three Final Four appearances from Season 77 to 80 (2014–2017).

In August 2022, Delos Santos was appointed as head coach of the University of the Philippines Fighting Maroons women's team.

He returned coaching the UST Golden Tigresses in June 2025, as his predecessor Kungfu Reyes transitions to a sports director role. He will remain concurrent Cignal HD coach.

=== Club ===
Delos Santos has coached in the Philippine Super Liga (PSL). He was head coach of the Petron Blaze Spikers from 2016 to 2019, helping the team clinch four titles in four competitions namely the 2017 All-Filipino, 2018 Grand Prix and All-Filipino, and the 2019 Grand Prix Conferences.

In 2017, he led a PSL selection team in the 2017 Annual Princess Maha Chakri Sirindhorn's Cup Volleyball Tournament in Sisaket, Thailand.

PSL side Cignal HD Spikers tapped Delos Santos as an assistant coach to Edgar Barroga in January 2020. In March 2021, he was elevated as head coach of the Cignal HD Spikers after Barroga's departure. He became the team's first coach in the Premier Volleyball League (PVL) after Cignal left the PSL. He led Cignal to three silver and five bronze medal finishes in the PVL before its disbandment in April 2026.

=== National team ===
In 2018, Delos Santos was appointed as head coach of the Philippines women's national team replacing Ramil de Jesus. He returned to the role under an interim basis to coach the team at the 2026 AVC Women's Volleyball Cup due to regular coach Tai Bundit's injury.

== Personal life ==
Delos Santos' nickname 'Shaq' came to be during his collegiate playing years with FEU. His dark complexion drew comparison to him and NBA player Shaquille O'Neal.
