= August Santamaria =

Personal information
- Nationality: Filipino
- Born: 1948 or 1949 (age 77–78)
- Hometown: Calabanga, Camarines Sur

Coaching information
Previous teams coached
Years	Teams
–1997 –2007	Philippines (women); University of Santo Tomas (women)

Augusto Santamaria (Note: Surname is alternatively spelled as Santa Maria, or abbreviated as Sta. Maria) (born 1948 or 1949)is a Filipino retired volleyball coach who mentored the Philippine women's national team and the University of Santo Tomas Tigresses volleyball team.

== Career ==
A native of Calabanga, Camarines Sur , Santamaria has coached the Philippine women's national team in multiple occasions. He coach the squad which played in the 1997 Asian Women's Volleyball Championship and the 1997 Southeast Asian Games in Jakarta.

Santamaria has also led the University of Santo Tomas Tigresses volleyball team as its head coach last guiding them in University Athletic Association of the Philippines (UAAP) Season 69 in 2007. UST won the women's volleyball title in that season. He suffered a stroke in 2008 which ended his coaching career.

== Personal life ==
He is the brother of Australia-based coach Tomas Santamaria.
