= 1994 UAAP Women's Volleyball =

== Elimination round ==
FIRST ROUND OF ELIMINATIONS
JULY 24							JULY 27						
Game	Team	1st	2nd	3rd	4th	5th	Game	Team	1st	2nd	3rd	4th	5th
1st	National University	4	0	1	-	-	1st	University of the East	15	15	15	-	-
1st	University of Santo Tomas	15	15	15	-	-	1st	National University	5	5	7	-	-
2nd	De La Salle University	3	1	5	-	-	2nd	De La Salle University	7	11	4	-	-
2nd	Ateneo de Manila University	15	15	15	-	-	2nd	University of the Philippines	15	15	15	-	-
3rd	University of the Philippines	7	7	10	-	-	3rd	Far Eastern University	15	15	15	-	-
3rd	University of the East	15	15	15	-	-	3rd	Ateneo de Manila University	11	11	10	-	-
JULY 31							AUGUST 4						
Game	Team	1st	2nd	3rd	4th	5th	Game	Team	1st	2nd	3rd	4th	5th
1st	National University	13	13	13	-	-	1st	Far Eastern University	15	15	15	-	-
1st	De La Salle University	15	15	15	-	-	1st	National University	0	0	0	-	-
2nd	University of the East	11	12	13	-	-	2nd	De La Salle University	0	0	0	-	-
2nd	University of Santo Tomas	15	15	15	-	-	2nd	University of Santo Tomas	15	15	15	-	-
3rd	University of the Philippines	4	5	5	-	-	3rd	Ateneo de Manila University	15	15	15	-	-
3rd	Far Eastern University	15	15	15	-	-	3rd	University of the Philippines	5	3	5	-	-
AUGUST 7							AUGUST 10						
Game	Team	1st	2nd	3rd	4th	5th	Game	Team	1st	2nd	3rd	4th	5th
1st	National University	7	3	2	-	-	1st	University of the Philippines	15	15	15	-	-
1st	Ateneo de Manila University	15	15	15	-	-	1st	National University	7	10	13	-	-
2nd	University of the East	15	15	15	-	-	2nd	Far Eastern University	10	8	4	-	-
2nd	De La Salle University	13	13	13	-	-	2nd	University of the East	15	15	15	-	-
3rd	University of Santo Tomas	11	11	7	-	-	3rd	Ateneo de Manila University	13	16	15	-	-
3rd	Far Eastern University	15	15	15	-	-	3rd	University of Santo Tomas	15	17	17	-	-
AUGUST 13
Game	Team	1st	2nd	3rd	4th	5th							
1st	University of Santo Tomas	15	15	15	-	-							
1st	University of the Philippines	3	5	7	-	-							
2nd	De La Salle University	0	0	0	-	-							
2nd	Far Eastern University	15	15	15	-	-							
3rd	University of the East	15	7	15	3	17							
3rd	Ateneo de Manila University	12	15	13	15	15							
SECOND ROUND OF ELIMINATIONS
AUGUST 17							AUGUST 20						
Game	Team	1st	2nd	3rd	4th	5th	Game	Team	1st	2nd	3rd	4th	5th
1st	University of Santo Tomas	15	15	15	-	-	1st	National University	0	0	0	-	-
1st	National University	1	0	0	-	-	1st	Ateneo de Manila University	15	15	15	-	-
2nd	De La Salle University	3	6	4	-	-	2nd	University of the Philippines	15	15	15	-	-
2nd	University of the East	15	15	15	-	-	2nd	De La Salle University	5	7	7	-	-
3rd	Ateneo de Manila University	15	15	15	-	-	3rd	University of the East	12	12	14	-	-
3rd	University of the Philippines	0	0	0	-	-	3rd	Far Eastern University	15	15	17	-	-
AUGUST 23							AUGUST 25						
Game	Team	1st	2nd	3rd	4th	5th	Game	Team	1st	2nd	3rd	4th	5th
1st	De La Salle University	15	15	15	-	-	1st	National University	0	0	0	-	-
1st	National University	11	12	10	-	-	1st	Far Eastern University	15	15	15	-	-
2nd	Far Eastern University	15	15	15	-	-	2nd	University of Santo Tomas	15	15	15	-	-
2nd	University of the Philippines	2	6	5	-	-	2nd	De La Salle University	8	4	5	-	-
3rd	Ateneo de Manila University	15	15	15	-	-	3rd	University of the Philippines	10	7	6	-	-
3rd	University of Santo Tomas	12	13	11	-	-	3rd	University of the East	15	15	15	-	-
AUGUST 28							AUGUST 31						
Game	Team	1st	2nd	3rd	4th	5th	Game	Team	1st	2nd	3rd	4th	5th
1st	University of the East	15	15	15	-	-	1st	National University	10	10	10	-	-
1st	National University	4	4	1	-	-	1st	University of the Philippines	15	15	15	-	-
2nd	De La Salle University	0	0	0	-	-	2nd	Ateneo de Manila University	17	15	15	-	-
2nd	Ateneo de Manila University	15	15	15	-	-	2nd	Far Eastern University	14	9	7	-	-
3rd	Far Eastern University	15	15	15	-	-	3rd	University of Santo Tomas	15	12	14	17	15
3rd	University of Santo Tomas	5	8	10	-	-	3rd	University of the East	13	15	17	16	4
SEPTEMBER 3
Game	Team	1st	2nd	3rd	4th	5th							
1st	Far Eastern University	15	15	15	-	-							
1st	De La Salle University	0	0	0	-	-							
2nd	University of the Philippines	5	6	15									
2nd	University of Santo Tomas	15	15	17	-	-							
3rd	University of the East	3	3	7	-	-							
3rd	Ateneo de Manila University	15	15	15	-	-							

== Postseason ==
POST-SEASON TOURNAMENT
PLAYOFFS - SEPTEMBER 7
Game	Team	1st	2nd	3rd	4th	5th
1st	University of Santo Tomas	7	11	15	17	15
1st	Ateneo de Manila University	15	15	13	16	12
FINAL FOUR GAME 1 - SEPTEMBER 9
Game	Team	1st	2nd	3rd	4th	5th
1st	Far Eastern University	15	15	15	-	-
1st	University of the East	12	3	7	-	-
2nd	Ateneo de Manila University	15	15	15	-	-
2nd	University of Santo Tomas	11	11	11	-	-
FINAL FOUR GAME 2 - SEPTEMBER 11
Game	Team	1st	2nd	3rd	4th	5th
1st	University of Santo Tomas	13	15	10	17	15
1st	Ateneo de Manila University	15	12	15	16	11
FINALS GAME 1 - SEPTEMBER 14
Game	Team	1st	2nd	3rd	4th	5th
1st	Far Eastern University	15	15	15	-	-
1st	University of Santo Tomas	11	12	3	-	-
FINALS GAME 1 - SEPTEMBER 17
Game	Team	1st	2nd	3rd	4th	5th
1st	University of Santo Tomas	5	7	4	-	-
1st	Far Eastern University	15	15	15	-	-

Preceded by Season 56 (1993)	UAAP volleyball seasons Season 57 (1994) volleyball	Succeeded by Season 58 (1995)
