= UST Golden Tigresses volleyball =

Volleyball team of the University of Santo Tomas

UST Golden Tigresses
- University: University of Santo Tomas
- Nickname: Golden Tigresses
- Founded: 1938
- Location: Manila
- Head coach: Shaq delos Santos (4th season)

Main league
- League: UAAP
- Season 88 (2026): Third place

Championships
- UAAP: 16: 1974; 1975; 1976; 1984; 1985; 1986; 1987; 1988; 1989; 1990; 1992; 1993; 1996; 1997; 2007; 2010

The UST Golden Tigresses are the women's collegiate varsity volleyball team of the UST Growling Tigers, representing the University of Santo Tomas in the University Athletic Association of the Philippines (UAAP). They are one of the UAAP's winningest teams with 16 championships, the last coming in 2010 against the De La Salle Lady Spikers, under coach Shaq delos Santos. Delos Santos returned as the team's head coach on June 3, 2025, replacing Kungfu Reyes, who had guided the team since 2016.

The Tigresses swept their elimination games in 1988, 1993 and 1996 and were declared automatic champions in each of those years. They also have the second most Final Four appearances behind La Salle's 21 and tied with the FEU Lady Tamaraws' 16. UST made seven straight Final Four appearances from 2005 until 2012. Their semifinal streak currently stands at six, beginning in 2019.

The Tigresses also have six Premier Volleyball League championships, with the distinction of being the inaugural winners in 2004 when the tournament was still known as the Shakey’s V-League. They hold the same number of six championships in the UNIGAMES, with back-to-back wins in 2009 and 2010, and then capped by a three-peat from 2016 until 2018.

== History ==
The Golden Tigresses’ team colors were derived from UST’s school colors of gold, black, and white, which were in turn inspired by the flag of the Papal States since their pontifical status was obtained in 1902.

The Tigresses who used to be called the Lady Goldies won their first championship in 1974. Even as the men’s volleyball team existed during their time in the National Collegiate Athletic Association (NCAA) in the 1920s, the women’s team was only formed in the same year of the sports’ inception in the UAAP in 1938. The 1974 title was the first of three consecutive championships won until 1976. They next achieved an unprecedented seven-year title run from 1984 until 1990 under then coach August Sta. Maria.

=== Year-by-year highlights ===
1980
Sta. Maria, who was a former national team player replaced Nurbahasa Gadja as the coach of the Lady Goldies in 1980 and guided the team to a runner-up finish against the FEU Lady Tamaraws in the UAAP.

1987
The Lady Goldies prevented a season sweep by FEU when they won in the last game of the eliminations in four sets. They went on to win the best-of-three Finals series by a two-game sweep to clinch their fourth straight UAAP championship.

UST earlier won the Philippine Amateur Volleyball Association’s Intercollegiate Championship in the preseason for the second straight year. Josie Vasquez was named Most Valuable Player of the tournament.

1988
The Lady Goldies became automatic champions after scoring a 14–0 season sweep. They defeated FEU in a five-set thriller in the last game of eliminations. They repeated their conquest of the Lady Tamaraws in the National Intercollegiate tournament with a five-set win to bag the championship. Asther Paglinawan was hailed MVP of the tournament.

1990
UST defeated the Adamson Lady Falcons in the Finals to achieve a rare seven-peat in the UAAP. They next won the National Collegiate Championship in the postseason after defeating the TIP Rangerettes in four sets. National team member Natalie Cruz was named MVP of the tournament.

1992
FEU and UST ended the eliminations with identical 12–2 records. All the players from the seven-peat team have already graduated, leaving Coach August Sta. Maria a group of newcomers to the 1992 Finals series. They defeated the Lady Tamaraws in straight sets to take Game One, with attacks from sisters Eden and Elvira Garovillas, Annaliza Yu, and Angeline Lim to close out the third set, 15–10.

The Tigresses who had changed their name from the Lady Goldies at the start of the season repeated over FEU to sweep the best-of-three series in another three-set game to reclaim the championship that was won by the Lady Tamaraws the previous year. It was the team’s blocking and serves that carried them to the win. Maria Luisa Mejia served three straight aces in the second set, while Lim, Mila Rañada, Ana May Calma, and Mylene Cuenca put up a stonewall defense to shut out their opponents, 15–2 in the third set to put the game away in only 50 minutes.

UST became back-to-back champions of the National Intercollegiate Tournament in the preseason in February and the National Open Championship in the postseason in November.

1993
The Tigresses were declared automatic champions again after another 14–0 sweep. They defeated the Lady Tamaraws again in the last game of eliminations in four sets with excellent plays at the net from Yu, Rañada, Cuenca, and Roxanne Pimentel.

In the preseason, they won again over FEU to complete a three-peat of the National Intercollegiate Tournament. After just a month, Mylene Cuenca powered UST to defeat the San Sebastian Lady Stags in three straight sets to bag another three-peat, this time in the National Collegiate Championship. The Lady Stags, however got back at them in the postseason with a three straight-set win, causing them to end up as runners-up in the National Open Championship.

1995
UST went undefeated in the first round of eliminations after winning over rival FEU in a five-set game to tally a 7–0 record. They were however beaten by the De La Salle Lady Spikers in five sets in the second round, preventing them from achieving a season sweep and an automatic championship. The Tigresses ended the eliminations ranked first with a 13–1 record and had faced the FEU Lady Tamaraws once again in the Finals. They lost in two games to finish as runners-up in the UAAP tournament.

1996
The Tigresses defeated FEU in the last game of the eliminations to record another undefeated season at 14–0 and claim an automatic championship. The four-set victory ended two years of their runner-up finishes to the Lady Tamaraws who were back-to-back champions of the 1994 and 1995 seasons. National team member and team captain Roxanne Pimentel led in scoring which was highlighted by her six straight kills at the start of the fourth set. She was named MVP of the season.

1997
The Tigresses won their last 11 games after suffering an opening day three-set loss to the UP Lady Maroons. They faced the FEU Lady Tamaraws in the Finals in a repeat of their last game of the elimination rounds. UST defeated FEU in four sets to place first in the standings with an 11-1 record and gained a twice-to-beat advantage over their opponent. The Lady Tamaraws were able to extend the series after a five-set win over the error-prone Tigresses. UST was held scoreless in the fourth set due to spiking errors by Rosalyn Labay and Janice Namuco. They were able to regroup and successfully defended their 1996 title with a four-set win in the next game. The Tigresses lost the first set, 6-15 and were trailing in the second at 4-12 when rookie Kimberly Racaza was brought in by coach August Sta. Maria to reinforce their front line. She teamed up with Labay, Corrine Canonoy, and Johanna Botor to turn the game around and win the next three sets.

1999, 2000
The Tigresses lost in the Finals to first-time champions La Salle. The Lady Spikers repeated their conquest of UST the following year when they won their Final Four match.

2001
They began their season with two losses in their first three games. After losing to La Salle, they bounced back with a three-set win over the Ateneo Lady Eagles, only to lose again to FEU in their next game. The Lady Tamaraws capitalized on crucial errors by Joyce Calapan and Kate Co Yu Kang in putting away the Tigresses in straight sets.

They next racked up five straight wins, including one over La Salle in the second round before being halted by the undefeated Lady Tamaraws for a 6–3 record. The Tigresses were able to mount another five-game winning run for a tie at second place in the standings, but their Final Four hopes went down the drain when FEU completed a 14–0 season sweep and were declared automatic champions. The Tigresses had one game remaining for the season against the UE Amazons, who they vented their ire on for a three-set win. Joyce Pano, Jocelyn Capati, and Meann Calapan led the team to a 25–18 third set win. They shared the same 11–3 record with La Salle but had to settle for third place in rank due to an inferior quotient.

The Tigresses earlier lost to the Lady Spikers in the National Intercollegiate Tournament Finals in the preseason. UST rallied to prevent a three-set sweep by La Salle and were looking to win in the fourth set. The score was tied at 21–all, but a non-call by the referees on a four-touch violation by their opponents changed the game’s complexion. Down 22–23, the Tigresses scored a point, but quickly committed a service error to yield match point to La Salle. A net violation by UST in the ensuing play ended the championship match at 23–25.

2002
After an opening day loss to reigning titlists FEU in four sets, UST won their next six games to close out the first round with a 6–1 record. They began the next round of eliminations with a five-set win over the UP Lady Maroons, followed by four more wins out of the next five games that they played. After their four-set victory over the Ateneo Lady Eagles, the Tigresses ranked second in the standings with an 11–2 record going into their last game of eliminations. UST needed the win against the league-leading Lady Tamaraws who were undefeated at 13–0 in order to prevent another season sweep and an automatic championship by their upcoming opponent.

The Tigresses put up a tough stand in their four-set loss, with the last set extending to 24–26. In the end, FEU retained their championship and have remained unbeaten in the UAAP in two seasons.

UST won the PRISAA Championship in the preseason in April after defeating FEU, the tournament’s defending champions in four sets. Joyce Pano led her teammates, Jocelyn Capati, Kate Co Yu Kang, the comebacking Theresa Romano, and their graduating captain Kimberly Racaza in a balanced attack and efficient defense at the net. Pano was selected MVP, while Capati took Best Attacker honors.

Later in May, the Tigresses won the National Open Championship against their seniors who were playing for the UST Alumni team in three straight sets. Capati was chosen tournament MVP and Best Blocker, while Pano and Lourdes Palomo were hailed Best Spiker and Best Setter respectively. The Alumni team’s Rosalyn Labay and Cynthia Arceo won the Best Receiver and Best Server awards.

2003
The Tigresses lost to FEU in four sets in the first round to start their season, before winning their next six matches to tie the Lady Tamaraws and the De La Salle Lady Spikers with 6-1 records. La Salle, however ranked first at the end of the first round of eliminations due to a superior quotient over the two teams. UST earlier defeated the Lady Spikers in four sets as they bounced back from their opening day loss and gave La Salle their lone loss in the first round.

The Tigresses repeated over La Salle with a straight-set win in the second round. They led by as high as 12 points in the third set, winning 25-13 to close out the match. UST sped to 11 wins against a single loss to tie FEU at first place, before losing anew to the Lady Tamaraws to end the elimination rounds at second place with a 12-2 record. They faced La Salle in the Final Four with a twice-to-beat advantage, but lost and were eliminated in two games to end the season at third place.

2004
The Tigresses once again began their season on a loss. They had mounted a comeback after trailing the De La Salle Lady Spikers two sets to none, with the fourth set ending at 26–24, but could only manage 9 points in the deciding set. They went on to win the rest of their games in the first round for a 6-1 record and solo second place in the standings. They lost to La Salle again in the second round, giving their undefeated opponents a season sweep and the automatic championship. UST ended up as runners-up with another 12-2 record. Ging Balse was named Rookie of the Year in the awarding ceremonies.

In the off-season, the Tigresses split the championships with La Salle in the inaugural season of the Shakey's V-League, with UST beating the Lady Spikers in the first conference in July, and then a reversal of roles in the second conference in February of the following year. UST emerged on top of the six-team tournament with a 7-1 record at the end of eliminations, with their lone loss coming at the hands of La Salle. The Lady Spikers actually had the same 7–1 card, but were ranked lower in quotient. They qualified to the Finals after defeating the Lyceum Lady Pirates by a two-game sweep of their best-of-three semifinal series.

UST took a four-set Game One win with the rookie Balse top scoring for 16 points. She again led the Tigresses to another four-set victory with 25 points en route to her MVP award and a sweep of the Finals series for her team. Team captain Kate Co Yu Kang, who had missed the championship series to play for the national team in Thailand won the Best Receiver award, while the already-graduated Joyce Pano was named Best Server of the tournament.

In the second conference, the Tigresses went 0-2 against the Lady Spikers in the best-of-three Finals. UST took the first two sets in Game One, with the first set reaching a 29-27 score, but La Salle came back and forced a deciding fifth set where UST was limited to only 7 points. The long game took a toll on guest player and team captain Roxanne Pimentel, who sprained her ankle and was forced to play limited minutes in Game Two. Trailing two sets to none and with the Tigresses down 20-24 in the third, Balse and second-year player Venus Bernal scored consecutive kills to carry the team within one point at 23-24. A service error by Bernal, however, ended the game in an anticlimactic fashion. Balse was named the Best Receiver of the tournament.

2005
After a back-to-back season opening losses to FEU and UP, the Tigresses next won against UE and Ateneo for a 2–2 record. With Karen Co Yu Kang’s graduation, it took time for Denise Tan to adjust to her new role as the team’s starting setter. Co Yu Kang’s sister and team captain Kate, meanwhile was relegated to the libero position while recuperating from a knee injury that she sustained in the preseason. UST ended the first round of eliminations with a 3–4 record, but went on to win six of the total seven games in the next round to qualify to the Final Four.

They lost to the top-seeded De La Salle Lady Spikers in the semifinals in straight sets, ending their season at fourth place on a 9–5 record. Lilet Mabbayad, who played backup to Balse in the middle edged out teammates Angeli Tabaquero, Lorraine Zapata, and Karla Cotoco to win the Rookie of the Year award.

In the Shakey’s V-League, the Tigresses began their campaign with a four-set loss to the San Sebastian Lady Stags. The team alternated wins and losses and ended the first round with a 2–3 record. Coach August Sta. Maria attributed the team’s performance to unavoidable lineup changes. Guest player and open spiker Joyce Pano missed some games to attend to her father’s wake, while former Tigress Joanne Botor-Carpio was a late replacement for the setter position. UST also lined up three new players in Tabaquero, Zapata, Cotoco, and Joanne dela Fuente. UST came back strong in the second round and came out undefeated in the next five games, avenging their first round losses to San Sebastian, Ateneo, and La Salle with Ging Balse and guest team captain Roxanne Pimentel leading the charge. They won five of their six semifinal round games to qualify to the Finals with a 12–4 record in a tie with La Salle. The two teams have so far met in all three conference Finals since the tournament began the previous year. They were swept by the Lady Spikers in the best-of-three championship series with both games ending in four sets. Coach August rued his team’s uncoordinated attacks which resulted the opponents’ numerous kill blocks. Pimentel was selected Best Attacker, while Balse won the Best Server award of the tournament.

2006–07
With reigning champions La Salle out on a season-long suspension, the Tigresses swept all six games of the first round of eliminations. The team was so dominant that they only lost two sets, one each against FEU and Adamson in the entire round as they posted an average lead of 9 points in the sets that they won. The FEU Lady Tamaraws avenged their first-round loss in five sets to tie UST at first place in the standings at 9–1. Both teams won their two remaining games for an 11–1 record and battled it out in a playoff for the number one seeding heading into the Final Four. The Tamaraws prevailed with another five-set win, leaving the Tigresses to face the third-ranked Adamson Lady Falcons with a twice-to-beat advantage.

They were defeated by Adamson in four sets to extend the Final Four to a second game. UST handily defeated the Falcons in straight sets to advance to the Finals against FEU. The Tigresses took Game One of the best-of-three series with a four-set win behind Balse, Venus Bernal and Angeli Tabaquero’s combined 50-point output. The sophomore Tabaquero’s 15 attack points and 2 kill blocks earned her the Player of the Game award. They were able to sweep the Tamaraws in two games after a three-set win, ending a decade-long title drought for the women’s team. Shaq delos Santos took the helm at coaching as August Sta. Maria contracted measles before the second game. Tabaquero was again named Best Player of the Game, as veteran spiker Bernal garnered the season’s Most Valuable Player and Best Setter awards. Denise Tan was hailed Best Setter of the tournament.

In the preseason, the Tigresses won all their games in the National Intercollegiate Tournament including a four-set victory over the University of the Cordilleras Lady Jaguars in the championship game. Balse, the tournament MVP and Bernal who was named Best Attacker led the team with a combined 18 attacks and 12 blocks. The Intercollegiate was the first tournament that the team joined five months after the previous UAAP season ended. UST did not participate in the V-League to concentrate in their preparation for the UAAP after the tournament shifted to the second semester of the school year.

In the UNIGAMES, the Tigresses ended up as runners-up to FEU after a four-set loss in the championship match.

2007–08
UST ended the eliminations tied with Adamson and FEU at 12–2, with both losses coming at the hands of the Lady Tamaraws. The Lady Falcons got the number one ranking due to a superior quotient, leaving the two other teams to contend in a one-game playoff for the twice-to-beat incentive heading into the Final Four. The Tigresses lost in four sets after posting a 26–24 win in the first set.

In the Final Four, the team mounted a comeback against FEU after being down 0–2 in sets by forcing a deciding fifth set, only to fall short to yield a 9–15 score. Hannah Mance, their rookie who had alternated with the graduating Ging Balse at the middle carried the Tigresses to their third set win. Venus Bernal and Angeli Tabaquero led in scoring with 24 and 21 points respectively. Balse was named Best Attacker in the awarding ceremonies.

In the preseason, UST went down in four sets to end up as runners-up to Adamson in the championship game of the National Intercollegiate Tournament. The Tigresses who averted a three-set sweep by limiting their opponents to just 7 points, lost on back-to-back kills by Lady Falcon Hannah Suarez. The team had tied the game at 23–all but their two defensive errors ended the match and gave their opponents the championship. Venus Bernal, who was named the tournament’s Best Attacker for the second straight year led the team with 18 kills and 3 blocks.

The Tigresses rejoined the Shakey’s V-League in the first conference of their fourth season. They defeated La Salle in four sets at the start of the tournament. Venus Bernal, the reigning UAAP MVP topscored for the team with 27 points, while getting help from Balse and Lilet Mabbayad in containing Eve Sanorseang, the Lady Archers' reinforcement from Thailand.

UST alternated their wins with losses to end the eliminations at third place on a 4–3 record. They went on to win all four of their semifinal games and faced the San Sebastian Lady Stags in the Finals. They won in Game One in straight sets and went on to sweep the series with a four-set victory to clinch their second championship in the league. Balse was named Finals MVP and Best Attacker of the tournament.

The Tigresses repeated their conquest of La Salle in their opening game of the second conference in October following a three-set win. Bernal and Balse led the attack with a combined 29-point output. After losing to the Ateneo Lady Eagles, UST bounced back to win all five of their elimination round games to finish on top of the standings with a 6–1 record. They managed to win only two of their four semifinal round games and ended up tied with Ateneo in second place with an 8–3 record. They won their playoff game against the Lady Eagles in four sets to set another Finals meeting with San Sebastian.

The Lady Stags took Game One of the best-of-three Finals series with a five-set win over the Tigresses. UST came back from a 0–2 deficit to force a deciding fifth set. After tying the score at 12–all from a net violation by San Sebastian’s Lou Ann Latigay, the Tigresses yielded two quick points to their opponents who had reached match point at 14–12. After winning a point from Venus Bernal, Latigay scored the game-winning point for the Lady Stags. UST prevented a series sweep by San Sebastian after winning in straight sets in Game Two. The Tigresses’ defense prevented 57 of their opponents’ attacks, mostly by blocks. They became back-to-back conference champions with a repeat of their conquest of the Lady Stags after a five-set Game Three win. Consecutive attacks from Bernal, Balse, and guest player Sue Roces propelled the team to a 9–4 lead in the fifth set, until a service ace by Bernal put them at match point. A service error by Balse sent the Stags to 9–14, but a determined Bernal put the game to its end with an uncontested spike. The three players combined for 73 points as Bernal was hailed Finals MVP. Angeli Tabaquero earlier won the Sportsmanship award.

2008–09
Long-time assistant coach and former FEU Tamaraw Shaq delos Santos replaced August Sta. Maria as the head coach of the Golden Tigresses in the summer after the latter suffered a partial stroke in March, causing almost a month-long confinement at the UST Hospital.

The Tigresses, who were missing the already graduated Venus Bernal and Ging Balse, as well as Angeli Tabaquero who went on a personal leave for the season began the tournament on a five-set win over the FEU Lady Tamaraws but suffered back-to-back three-set losses to La Salle and Adamson. Former backup setter Aiza Maizo was promoted to the frontline together with rookies Judy Caballejo and Bernice Co to lead the attack for the team. They won three of their next four games to place fourth in the standings at the end of the first round of eliminations with a 4–3 record.

UST won their last four games in the second round to tie the Adamson Lady Falcons at third place with a 9–5 record. Their last game in the elimination round was coincidentally against the Falcons where Maizo, already the league leader in scoring matched their opponents’ Angela Benting’s 33 points with 30 of her own to help her team rebound from a first set loss and put away the Falcons in four sets. The Tigresses won and secured the #3 seed in the Final Four after repeating over Adamson in three sets in the one-game playoff. Maizo and Bernice Co combined for 30 points to lead the team in scoring.

The second-seeded FEU Tamaraws repeated their Final Four conquest of UST with a similar four-set victory. After being down 14–25 in the first set, the Tigresses turned a 3–8 deficit around behind Maizo's efforts for a 12–all count. The team's successive blocks resulted in a 25–19 second set win, but the Tamaraws took the next two sets for the win and eliminated UST from the Finals. Maizo was named Best Scorer and Best Attacker in the awarding ceremonies.

In the Shakey’s V-League, the San Sebastian Stags finally won the championship over the Tigresses in their third Finals meeting. UST was swept in the best-of-three series with Game Two ending in four sets. Guest players Venus Bernal and Ging Balse led the team in scoring with 20 and 13 points respectively. Incoming team captain Aiza Maizo, who had given the Tigresses their last point to lead 21–20 was named the tournament’s Best Server.

UST earlier won the PVF Intercollegiate championship when they defeated the Adamson Lady Falcons in three sets. They defeated the De La Salle Lady Spikers in their semifinal game, also in three sets to avenge their four-set opening game defeat. Balse was named tournament MVP, while Bernal and Angeli Tabaquero won the Best Attacker and Best Server awards. The Tigresses also placed third in the UNIGAMES in the preseason.

2009–10
The Tigresses racked up three straight wins after an opening day loss to defending champion La Salle. The Lady Spikers forced a deciding fifth set and broke loose from an 11–all deadlock with UST to win 15–11. Team captain Aiza Maizo and rookie Maru Banaticla combined for 42 points in the team's losing effort. They next won over UP, FEU, and the NU Lady Bulldogs. Banaticla teamed up with the returning Angeli Tabaquero and Maika Ortiz to lead the team in scoring. They defeated the Adamson Lady Falcons in the last game of the first round of eliminations for a tie at third place with Adamson and Ateneo at 5–2. Maizo topscored for the team with 23 points.

Earlier in the season, Aiza Maizo scored 32 points against Ateneo. In another game, UST held UE to just 2 points in the first set of their second round matchup.

The Tigresses went undefeated in the second round to finish second in the standings at 12–2 and gain a twice-to-beat advantage in the Final Four. They were able to avenge their first-round losses against La Salle and Ateneo. UST gave the Lady Spikers their lone loss in the eliminations before repeating over the Lady Eagles by eliminating them in the semifinal round in one game via a three-set win. In the Finals, the Tigresses swept La Salle in two games, each ending in four sets to give Delos Santos his first UAAP championship as head coach of the team. Angelie Tabaquero topscored with 13 points in Game 2, while setter Rhea Dimaculangan was hailed Finals MVP and Best Server of the season.

UST also swept the preseason tournaments, winning both conferences of the Shakey’s V-League, and the UNIGAMES. The Tigresses won the V-League title for the first time since 2007. After topping the eliminations with a 6–1 record, they defeated all five of their opponents in the quarterfinals to become the #1 seed in the best-of-three semifinal round. They won over the fourth-seeded FEU Lady Tamaraws in four sets to advance to the Finals. Balse led the team in scoring with 20 points. They defeated the San Sebastian Stags in three games to win the First Conference championship. Injuries earlier befell their two open hitters with Banaticla hurting her ankle and Tabaquero, her knee, which allowed San Sebastian to win Game Two and extend the series to a third and deciding match. Jean Balse was named MVP of the Conference.

They defeated La Salle in the UNIGAMES championship in Iloilo in October 2009 in straight sets, followed by another championship win in the Second Conference of the V-League. UST defeated the Adamson Lady Falcons via a two-game sweep. Aiza Maizo was named Conference and Finals MVP.

2010–11
UST opened their season with six straight wins before losing to the De La Salle Lady Spikers for a 6–1 record and a tie with La Salle at first place at the end of the first round of eliminations. They went on to lose three more games in the second round with a five-set upset from the UP Lady Maroons and a repeat by the Lady Spikers. UP had suffered eight straight losses prior to their meeting. Former Junior Tigress Carmela Lopez led the Lady Maroons with 20 points. The Tigresses lost in five sets to La Salle on the last game of the eliminations to end up second in the standings with a 10–4 record. UST rallied to win the second set, 27–25 after falling 20–25 in the opening set. They dominated their opponents in the next set with a 9–0 opening run behind attacks from Aiza Maizo and Judy Caballejo for a 25–18 win. A close fourth set saw the two teams switch leads nine times that ended on a loss by the Tigresses. UST lost the match after an error-prone fifth set caused the Lady Spikers to break away from a 10–all deadlock to win, 15–12.

UST eliminated the Adamson Lady Falcons in their Final Four match after a four-set win and advanced to face La Salle in the best-of-three Finals. The Tigresses failed to defend their 2010 title after losing to the Lady Spikers in two games. The first game of the championship series was tightly contested with the match going all the way to the fifth set. UST lost in straight sets in Game Two, with the third set ending at 26–28. The team capitalized from attacks by Maika Ortiz at the middle on quick sets by Rhea Dimaculangan. Ortiz also contributed back-to-back service aces after a rotation which saw the Tigresses mount a 6–0 run to lead La Salle, 24–19. UST had a string of defensive lapses and allowed their opponents to pull ahead with the win and the championship. Maizo was selected Best Scorer and Receiver of the season in the awarding ceremonies.

The Tigresses won their sixth championship in the Shakey’s V-League with a four-set victory over the San Sebastian Lady Stags in Game Three of the best-of-three series of the First Conference in June. UST met the Lady Stags for the fourth time in the tournament. After a 25–27 second set loss, the Tigresses sped to a 9–0 score to open the third set, with four points coming from Jean Balse’s service aces. They dominated San Sebastian for the rest of the match for a 25–12 and 25–15 score. Aiza Maizo, the conference’s Best Attacker and Finals MVP topscored for the team with 17 points. Maika Ortiz chipped in 16 markers.

UST won the UNIGAMES for the second straight year with another victory over 2009 Finals opponent La Salle, 3–0 in October. They won their quarterfinal game against UP, also in straight sets, and then defeated the University of St. La Salle in the semifinals in four sets. The Tigresses did not participate in the Second Conference of the V-League after the players requested for a break to focus on their studies and the upcoming UAAP season.

2011–12
Shaq delos Santos resigned as the team’s coach in April. He opted to not renew his contract which was set to expire in June. He was replaced by Odjie Mamon, a former Golden Spiker who was an assistant coach of the men’s volleyball team. De los Santos was reported to be going back to his alma mater as a member of the Lady Tamaraws’ coaching staff, and with the women’s national volleyball team at the same time.

The Tigresses began the season on back-to-back losses against Ateneo and Adamson. The team got going with four straight victories before being stopped by La Salle at the end of the first round of eliminations for a 4–3 record for a tie at third place in the standings. UST was looking to give the Lady Spikers their first loss and to extend their win streak to five games, but failed after losing in five sets. They began the deciding set with a 5–0 lead and even led 12–8 in their bid to reach the fifteen-point winning score, but La Salle was able to tie at 13–all. The game ended on a 15–17 score after UST failed to defend Michele Gumabao’s back-to-back hits. Maika Ortiz and Maru Banaticla combined for 32 points to topscore for the Tigresses.

UST finished the elimination rounds at third place with a 9–5 record. They defeated the fourth-seeded FEU Lady Tamaraws in their stepladder semifinal pairing, three sets to one. Banaticla topscored with 18 points with Ortiz and Judy Caballejo chipping in 15 and 11 respectively. They next faced the second-seeded Ateneo Lady Eagles who were vying for their first Finals appearance since joining the league. The Tigresses, faced with a twice-to-win disadvantage lost in four sets. After being down 0–2 in the first two sets, UST extended the match with a third set win. Ortiz and Banaticla teamed up for a 25–22 score. Ortiz, who topscored with 22 points later won the season’s Best Spiker award.

The Tigresses failed to defend their UNIGAMES championship in the preseason when they lost to Adamson in five sets in their quarterfinal match. The team ended the tournament at fifth place even as they went undefeated in the elimination round with victories over Jose Maria College, Central Philippine University, and the St. Benilde Lady Blazers. The team did not participate in the V-League after a miscommunication in the invitation and registration to the tournament.

2012–13
The Tigresses began their UAAP season with a five-set win over La Salle, ending a three-year losing streak to the Lady Spikers. UST won the first two sets but fell into danger of an upset after La Salle won the next two to force a deciding fifth set. Judy Caballejo, who topscored with 22 points bailed the team after her quick attack put the Tigresses ahead, 15–9 to end the match. They finished the first round of eliminations tied with Adamson and NU at third place with a 4–3 record.

UST wound up the eliminations tied with NU at fourth place with an 8–6 record following straight-set losses to Ateneo. They lost to the Lady Bulldogs in the playoff game for the fourth Final Four slot in four sets. The Tigresses failed to make it to the playoffs for the first time in ten years.

The Tigresses rejoined the Shakey’s V-League after skipping the past two conferences. They enlisted Thai national team player Utaiwan Kaensing as their middle blocker to reinforce Balse and Ortiz. They won all four of their elimination round games for a tie with the Ateneo Lady Eagles at 4–0 going into the crossover quarterfinal games. The Tigresses won three of the total four games, losing only to the Lady Eagles in four sets to end up as the #2 seed in the semifinal round. UST won the first set with a lopsided 25–7 score, but struggled in the next three sets, causing them to lose the match. Maru Banaticla committed a service error late in the fourth set which allowed Ateneo to pull ahead at 22–17. In the Final Four, the San Sebastian Lady Stags evened their best-of-three series after a five-set win with their Thai guest player Jeng Bualee scoring a record-setting 40 points. UST eliminated San Sebastian in the deciding Game Three in straight sets behind the heroics of Judy Caballejo.

The Tigresses lost to Ateneo in Game Three of their Finals series. After winning Game One in four sets, their opponents came back strong with a four-set win of their own to even the best-of-three series at one win apiece. The deciding Game Three lasted until the fifth set after UST, down 0–2 in sets rallied to win sets 3 and 4. With an injured Ging Balse playing sparingly, the Lady Eagles raced to a 20–10 lead in the first set before the Tigresses’ attempt for a comeback. They were only able to come to within 19–24 until the set point which was won by Ateneo’s Dzi Gervacio on a quick hit off libero Dancel Dusaran’s failed dig. Coach Odjie Mamon sent in Carmela Tunay and Pam Lastimosa to replace Balse and Maru Banaticla at the start of the fourth set. Loren Lantin also substituted for team captain Rhea Dimaculangan as the team’s setter and did wonders as UST reached set point at 24–17. After starting the fifth set with a 4–1 lead, they fell behind, 7–12. The Eagles’ Jem Ferrer and Sue Roces blocked a quick hit from Utaiwan as the Tigresses’ comeback was halted at 11–13. An attack by Caballejo and a kill block on Ateneo’s Alyssa Valdez tied the score at 13–all for the Tigresses. Cabellejo’s spike went out of bounds in the next play, sending their opponents to match point, and then a joust at the net was won by Roces who sent the ball to UST’s side with an uncontested spike to end the match at 15–13 in the fifth set. Maika Ortiz led UST with 18 points with Utaiwan, named Best Spiker of the tournament and Caballejo as the Best Server adding 16 and 17 points respectively.

2013–14
UST paraded relatively new players for their UAAP campaign, as veterans Maika Ortiz and Judy Caballejo have already graduated. Maru Banaticla, who was expected to lead the team was removed from the roster under controversial developments. Replacing Ortiz at the middle is second-year player Ria Meneses and the returning Tricia Santos, who had been out of the roster for three years.

The Tigresses fell to a four-game losing streak after starting the season on a 2–1 record. The team notched their first win over UP behind Jem Gutierrez’ 20-point output, but yielded a three-set loss to La Salle in their next outing. They defeated the UE Lady Warriors to snap their four-game skid, but were again beaten when they next faced the NU Lady Bulldogs.

With 4 wins and 8 losses, UST was hoping to win their remaining two matches for a tie at fourth place and a playoff to qualify to the Final Four. They were soundly beaten by Ateneo in straight sets, signalling their exit from further contention. Down by two sets, the Tigresses fought hard in the third as Tunay traded points with the Lady Eagles’ Michelle Morente, and had led at 23–22, but Ateneo was the more composed team, scoring three straight points to put the game to its end. They ended the season at sixth place by winning over Adamson in four sets for a 5–9 record.

Earlier in the year, the Tigresses ended their V-League stint at third place after defeating Adamson in three games. After losing their opening game against Ateneo, they were able to rack up wins to enter the quarterfinals. They topped their quarterfinal pool to arrange a semifinal duel against the other pool's second-ranked Lady Eagles, where they lost via a two-game sweep in their best-of-three affair. UST failed to reach the V-League Finals for the first time in the tournament’s history. The battle-for-third-place was also a best-of-three series, with the Lady Falcons taking Game One. The Tigresses survived by winning Game Two in four sets. Four players scored in double digits, as Aiza Maizo led the team with 19 points, followed by Pam Lastimosa’s 17, Jessey de Leon’s 14, and Maika Ortiz’ 11. They actually lost the first set, 24–26, but went on to win the succeeding sets. In Game Three, Lastimosa scored 19 points to lead the team to a four-set win to wrap up the series. She was named the tournament’s Most Improved Player in the awarding ceremonies.

The Tigresses won the UNIGAMES championship in October after a five-set victory over FEU. The Lady Tamaraws were looking to close out the match after winning the third set, and led UST, 2–1, until the Tigresses rallied to force the deciding set and won, 15–8.

== Coaches ==
=== Succession of head coaches ===
| No. | Head coach | Tenure |
|---|---|---|
| 1 | Unknown | Early years |
| 2 | Nurbahasa Gadja | Until 1979 |
| 3 | August Sta. Maria | 1980–2007 |
| 4 | Shaq delos Santos | 2008–2011 |
| 5 | Odjie Mamon | 2012–2015 |
| 6 | Kungfu Reyes | 2016–2025 |
| 7 | Shaq delos Santos | 2026–present |

== Rivalries ==
The UST Golden Tigresses and the FEU Lady Tamaraws met in the finals for a total of 13 seasons, with UST winning 11 times.

The rivalry between the De La Salle Lady Spikers and the Tigresses has also been apparent in women's volleyball with the two teams being frequent finalists in the UAAP Volleyball Championships, the UNIGAMES and the Shakey's V-League. The two teams met four times in the UAAP finals, with La Salle winning three. They also faced each other thrice in the finals of the Shakey's V-League, with UST winning the first and the Lady Spikers winning the latter two. The Tigresses have also defeated La Salle thrice in the UNIGAMES finals.

== Season-by-season record ==
| Champion | Runner-up | Third place |

=== Pre-Final Four era ===
| Season | Field | Eliminations | | | | | Playoffs | | | Head coach | Ref. |
| Season | Field | Finish | GP | W | L | PCT | Round | Opponent | Result | Head coach | Ref. |
|---|---|---|---|---|---|---|---|---|---|---|---|
| 1974 | 6 | | 10 | | | | Finals | FEU Lady Tamaraws | W | | |
| 1975 | 6 | | 10 | | | | Finals | FEU Lady Tamaraws | W | | |
| 1976 | 6 | | 10 | | | | Finals | FEU Lady Tamaraws | W | | |
| 1980 | 7 | | 12 | | | | Finals | FEU Lady Tamaraws | L | August Sta. Maria | |
| 1984 | 7 | | 12 | | | | Finals | FEU Lady Tamaraws | W | August Sta. Maria | |
| 1985 | 7 | | 12 | | | | Finals | FEU Lady Tamaraws | W | August Sta. Maria | |
| 1986 | 8 | | 14 | | | | Finals | FEU Lady Tamaraws (Note: The website ue.edu lists FEU as champions of Seasons 49 & 52) | W | August Sta. Maria | |
| 1987 | 8 | T-1st | 14 | 13 | 1 | .929 | Finals | FEU Lady Tamaraws | W 2–0 | August Sta. Maria | |
| 1988 | 8 | 1st | 14 | 14 | 0 | 1.000 | None held (Note: UST swept the eliminations and were declared automatic champions) | | | August Sta. Maria | |
| 1989 | 8 | | 14 | | | | Finals | FEU Lady Tamaraws | W | August Sta. Maria | |
| 1990 | 8 | | 14 | | | | Finals | Adamson Lady Falcons | W | August Sta. Maria | |
| 1991 | 8 | 3rd | 14 | | | | Did not qualify | | | August Sta. Maria | |
| 1992 | 8 | T-1st | 14 | 12 | 2 | .857 | Finals | FEU Lady Tamaraws | W 2–0 | August Sta. Maria | |
| 1993 | 8 | 1st | 14 | 14 | 0 | 1.000 | None held | | | August Sta. Maria | |
| 1994 | 7 (Note: Adamson did not field a team due to league suspension) | T-2nd | 12 | 9 | 3 | .750 | None held (Note: FEU swept the eliminations and were declared automatic champions) | | | August Sta. Maria | |
| 1995 | 8 | 1st | 14 | 13 | 1 | .929 | Finals | #2 FEU Lady Tamaraws | L 0–2 | August Sta. Maria | |
| 1996 | 8 | 1st | 14 | 14 | 0 | 1.000 | None held | | | August Sta. Maria | |
| 1997 | 7 (Note: Ateneo did not field a team) | 1st | 12 | 11 | 1 | .917 | Finals | #2 FEU Lady Tamaraws | W 1–1 | August Sta. Maria | |
| 1998 | 8 | 6th | 14 | | | | Did not qualify | | | August Sta. Maria | |

=== Final Four era ===
| Year | Season | Eliminations | | | | | Playoffs | | | Coach | Ref. |
| Year | Season | Field | GP | W | L | Rank | Round | Opponent | Result | Coach | Ref. |
|---|---|---|---|---|---|---|---|---|---|---|---|
| 1999 | 62 | 8 | 14 | | | 2nd | Final Four; Finals | #3 Adamson Lady Falcons #1 De La Salle Lady Spikers | W L | August Sta. Maria | |
| 2000 | 63 | 8 | 14 | | | 6th | Did not qualify | | | August Sta. Maria | |
| 2001 | 64 | 8 | 14 | 11 | 3 | 3rd | None held | | | August Sta. Maria | |
| 2002 | 65 | 8 | 14 | 11 | 3 | T-2nd | None held | | | August Sta. Maria | |
| 2003 | 66 | 8 | 14 | 12 | 2 | 2nd | Final Four | #3 De La Salle Lady Spikers | L 0–2 | August Sta. Maria | |
| 2004 | 67 | 8 | 14 | 12 | 2 | 2nd | None held (Note: La Salle swept the eliminations and were declared automatic champions) | | | August Sta. Maria | |
| 2005 | 68 | 8 | 14 | 9 | 5 | 4th | Final Four | #1 De La Salle Lady Spikers | L 0–1 | August Sta. Maria | |
| 2007 (Note: Tournament shifted to second semester of the academic year in Season 69) | 69 | 7 (Note: La Salle did not field a team due to league suspension) | 12 | 11 | 1 | T-1st | #1 seed playoff Final Four; Finals | FEU Lady Tamaraws #3 Adamson Lady Falcons #1 FEU Lady Tamaraws | L 0–1; W 1–1; W 2–0 | August Sta. Maria | |
| 2008 | 70 | 8 | 14 | 12 | 2 | T-2nd | #2 seed playoff Final Four | FEU Lady Tamaraws #2 FEU Lady Tamaraws | L 0–1; L 0–1 | August Sta. Maria | |
| 2009 | 71 | 8 | 14 | 9 | 5 | T-3rd | #3 seed playoff Final Four | Adamson Lady Falcons #2 FEU Lady Tamaraws | W 1–0; L 0–1 | Shaq delos Santos | |
| 2010 | 72 | 8 | 14 | 12 | 2 | 2nd | Final Four; Finals | #3 Ateneo Lady Eagles #1 De La Salle Lady Spikers | W 1–0; W 2–0 | Shaq delos Santos | |
| 2011 | 73 | 8 | 14 | 10 | 4 | 2nd | Final Four; Finals | #3 Adamson Lady Falcons #1 De La Salle Lady Spikers | W 1–0; L 0–2 | Shaq delos Santos | |
| 2012 | 74 | 8 | 14 | 9 | 5 | 3rd | Stepladder #1; Stepladder #2 | #4 FEU Lady Tamaraws #2 Ateneo Lady Eagles | W 1–0; L 0–1 | Odjie Mamon | |
| 2013 | 75 | 8 | 14 | 8 | 6 | T-4th | #4 seed playoff | NU Lady Bulldogs | L 0–1 | Odjie Mamon | |
| 2014 | 76 | 8 | 14 | 5 | 9 | 6th | Did not qualify | | | Odjie Mamon | |
| 2015 | 77 | 8 | 14 | 6 | 8 | T-4th | #4 seed playoff | FEU Lady Tamaraws | L 0–1 | Odjie Mamon | |
| 2016 | 78 | 8 | 14 | 5 | 9 | 6th | Did not qualify | | | Kungfu Reyes | |
| 2017 | 79 | 8 | 14 | 9 | 5 | 3rd | Final Four | #2 De La Salle Lady Spikers | L 0–1 | Kungfu Reyes | |
| 2018 | 80 | 8 | 14 | 4 | 10 | 7th | Did not qualify | | | Kungfu Reyes | |
| 2019 | 81 | 8 | 14 | 10 | 4 | T-2nd | #2 seed playoff Final Four; Finals | De La Salle Lady Spikers #3 De La Salle Lady Spikers #1 Ateneo Lady Eagles | W 1–0; W 1–0; L 1–2 | Kungfu Reyes | |
| 2020 | 82 | 8 | 2 | 1 | 1 | T-3rd | None held (Note: Tournament cancelled due to the COVID-19 pandemic) | | | Kungfu Reyes | |
| 2021 | 83 | Tournament cancelled | | | | | | | | Kungfu Reyes | |
| 2022 | 84 | 8 | 14 | 9 | 5 | 3rd | Stepladder | #4 Ateneo Blue Eagles | L 0–1 | Kungfu Reyes | |
| 2023 | 85 | 8 | 14 | 10 | 4 | 4th | Final Four | #1 De La Salle Lady Spikers | L 0–1 | Kungfu Reyes | |
| 2024 | 86 | 8 | 14 | 12 | 2 | 2nd | Final Four; Finals | #3 De La Salle Lady Spikers #1 NU Lady Bulldogs | W 1–0; L 0–2 | Kungfu Reyes | |
| 2025 | 87 | 8 | 14 | 9 | 5 | T-2nd | #2 seed playoff Final Four | De La Salle Lady Spikers #2 De La Salle Lady Spikers | L 0–1; L 0–1 | Kungfu Reyes | |
| 2026 | 88 | 8 | 14 | 8 | 6 | T-4th | #4 seed playoff Stepladder #1; Stepladder #2 | FEU Lady Tamaraws #3 Adamson Lady Falcons #2 NU Lady Bulldogs | W 1–0; W 1–0; L 0–1 | Shaq delos Santos | |

== Current season ==
=== Roster ===
As of 15 Feb 2026

UST Golden Tigresses roster
| No. | Pos. | Player | Height | Year | High school |
|---|---|---|---|---|---|
| 2 | OH | Stephanie Bien Arasan | 5' 5" | 1st | University of Santo Tomas |
| 4 | L | Ma. Bernadett Pepito (C) | 5' 3" | 5th | University of Santo Tomas |
| 5 | MB | Avril Denise Bron | 5' 8" | 1st | University of Santo Tomas |
| 8 | MB | Margaret Altea | 6' 0" | 2nd | University of Santo Tomas |
| 10 | OH | Xyza Rufel Gula | 5' 4" | 3rd | University of Santo Tomas |
| 11 | OP | Julia Balingit | 5' 10" | 1st | Seishin High School |
| 12 | MB | Lianne Penuliar | 5' 9" | 1st | University of Santo Tomas |
| 13 | OH | Jonna Chris Perdido | 5' 9" | 3rd | University of Mindanao Tagum College |
| 14 | L | Sandrine Victoria Escober | 5' 2" | 2nd | University of Santo Tomas |
| 15 | S | Arlene Waje | 5' 5" | 2nd | Jose Rizal Institute–Orani |
| 16 | S | Ma. Cassandra Rae Carballo | 5' 5" | 4th | De La Salle Santiago Zobel School |
| 17 | OH | Angeline Poyos | 5' 7" | 3rd | University of Santo Tomas |
| 18 | OP | Regina Grace Jurado | 5' 7" | 4th | University of Santo Tomas |
| 19 | MB | Mary Joe Coronado | 6' 3" | 2nd | University of Santo Tomas |
| 24 | S | Louise Anya Acojedo | 5' 5" | 1st | Jasper Place High School |
| 25 | MB | Blessing Ezinne Unekwe | 6' 2" | 2nd | Nigeria |

=== Team staff ===
| Name | Position |
|---|---|
| Cesael delos Santos | Head coach |
| Christian Fernandez | Assistant coach |
| Rico de Guzman | Assistant coach |
| Lerma Giron | Assistant coach |
| Kevin Villegas | Trainer |
| Sean Victor Padon | Trainer |
| Alyssa Paula Tomas | Physical therapist |

=== Rotation ===
UST Golden Tigresses starting lineup

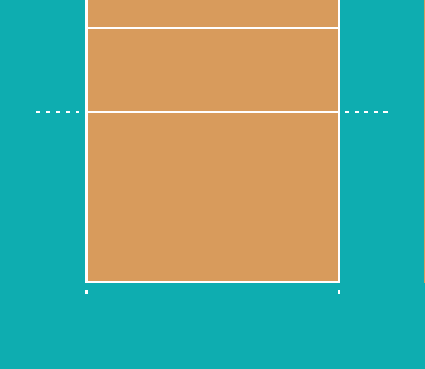

=== Fixtures and results ===
==== UAAP Season 88 (2026) tournament ====
Elimination round

| No. | Date | Time | Location | Opponent | Result | SR tally | Record | Game leaders | | | | | | |
| No. | Date | Time | Location | Opponent | Result | SR tally | Record | Points | Spike | Block | Serve | Receive | Dig | Set |
|---|---|---|---|---|---|---|---|---|---|---|---|---|---|---|
| 1 | Feb 15 | 4:51 pm PHT | Mall of Asia Arena | NU Lady Bulldogs | L 1–3 | 1–3 | 0–1 | 18– Poyos | 15– Poyos | 3– Tied | 1– Tied | 17– Pepito | 12– Pepito | 12– Waje |
| 2 | Feb 22 | 5:37 pm PHT | Mall of Asia Arena | De La Salle Lady Spikers | L 0–3 | 1–6 | 0–2 | 16– Poyos | 13– Poyos | 2– Poyos | 1– Tied | 8– Pepito | 9– Pepito | 6– Carballo |
| 3 | Feb 25 | 2:46 pm PHT | Araneta Coliseum | Ateneo Blue Eagles | W 3–0 | 4–6 | 1–2 | 21– Poyos | 19– Poyos | 3– Altea | 1– Tied | 4– Pepito | 14– Pepito | 14– Carballo |
| 4 | Feb 28 | 11:10 am PHT | UST QPav | UE Lady Red Warriors | W 3–0 | 7–6 | 2–2 | 11– Poyos | 8– Poyos | 2– Tied | 3– Perdido | 6– Pepito | 10– Pepito | 13– Carballo |
| 5 | Mar 7 | 3:44 pm PHT | Araneta Coliseum | Adamson Lady Falcons | L 0–3 | 7–9 | 2–3 | 18– Jurado | 17– Jurado | 2– Bron | 1– Tied | 11– Poyos | 13– Pepito | 19– Carballo |
| 6 | Mar 11 | 4:43 pm PHT | Mall of Asia Arena | UP Fighting Maroons | W 3–1 | 10–10 | 3–3 | 24– Poyos | 20– Poyos | 3– Tied | 2– Perdido | 15– Pepito | 9– Pepito | 18– Carballo |
| 7 | Mar 14 | 4:01 pm PHT | Mall of Asia Arena | FEU Lady Tamaraws | W 3–0 | 13–10 | 4–3 | 16– Poyos | 15– Poyos | 3– Bron | 4– Bron | 10– Pepito | 11– Pepito | 15– Carballo |
| 8 | Mar 21 | 3:22 pm PHT | Araneta Coliseum | Ateneo Blue Eagles | W 3–1 | 16–11 | 5–3 | 25– Poyos | 22– Poyos | 6– Jurado | 1– Tied | 11– Poyos | 21– Jurado | 22– Carballo |
| 9 | Mar 25 | 2:05 pm PHT | Araneta Coliseum | De La Salle Lady Spikers | L 1–3 | 17–14 | 5–4 | 20– Poyos | 19– Poyos | 1– Tied | 3– Carballo | 10– Pepito | 10– Pepito | 19– Carballo |
| 10 | Mar 29 | 5:57 pm PHT | UST QPav | FEU Lady Tamaraws | W 3–1 | 20–15 | 6–4 | 18– Poyos | 15– Poyos | 4– Bron | 1– Tied | 11– Perdido | 21– Pepito | 20– Carballo |
| 11 | Apr 5 | 11:44 am PHT | UST QPav | UE Lady Red Warriors | W 3–0 | 23–15 | 7–4 | 17– Poyos | 14– Poyos | 2– Bron | 2– Tied | 6– Poyos | 9– Tied | 17– Carballo |
| 12 | Apr 11 | 5:29 pm PHT | Filoil Centre | Adamson Lady Falcons | L 0–3 | 23–18 | 7–5 | 15– Poyos | 14– Poyos | 3– Perdido | 1– Carballo | 12– Poyos | 16– Pepito | 22– Carballo |
| 13 | Apr 19 | 2:07 pm PHT | Mall of Asia Arena | UP Fighting Maroons | W 3–1 | 26–19 | 8–5 | 25– Poyos | 24– Poyos | 2– Penuliar | 2– Tied | 13– Pepito | 18– Pepito | 29– Carballo |
| 14 | Apr 22 | 5:23 pm PHT | Araneta Coliseum | NU Lady Bulldogs | L 2–3 | 28–22 | 8–6 | 24– Poyos | 22– Poyos | 1– Tied | 2– Bron | 20– Pepito | 16– Tied | 25– Carballo |

Playoff for fourth seed

| No. | Date | Time | Location | Opponent | Result | Series | Record | Game leaders | | | | | | |
| No. | Date | Time | Location | Opponent | Result | Series | Record | Points | Spike | Block | Serve | Receive | Dig | Set |
|---|---|---|---|---|---|---|---|---|---|---|---|---|---|---|
| 1 | Apr 25 | 3:45 pm PHT | Araneta Coliseum | FEU Lady Tamaraws | W 3–1 | 1–0 | 9–6 | 26– Poyos | 22– Poyos | 4– Poyos | 0– None | 15– Pepito | 18– Pepito | 21– Carballo |

Stepladder semifinals

| Rd. | Date | Time | Location | Seed | Opponent | | Result | Series | Record | Game leaders | | | | | | |
| Rd. | Date | Time | Location | Seed | Seed | Team | Result | Series | Record | Points | Spike | Block | Serve | Receive | Dig | Set |
|---|---|---|---|---|---|---|---|---|---|---|---|---|---|---|---|---|
| 1 | Apr 29 | 4:16 pm PHT | Araneta Coliseum | No. 4 | No. 3 | Adamson Lady Falcons | W 3–0 | 1–0 | 10–6 | 17– Poyos | 15– Poyos | 2– Perdido | 2– Tied | 9– Pepito | 16– Pepito | 10– Carballo |
| 2 | May 2 | 2:59 pm PHT | Araneta Coliseum | No. 4 | No. 2 | NU Lady Bulldogs | L 1–3 | 0–1 | 10–7 | 19– Jurado | 17– Jurado | 2– Tied | 3– Perdido | 21– Perdido | 23– Pepito | 35– Carballo |

Source: Livestats.ph

== Offseason ==
=== Rosters ===
2025 UAAP Kickoff Party Exhibition Game
2 OH Bien Arasan ∙ 4 L Detdet Pepito, C ∙ 5 OP Avril Bron ∙ 6 MB Kaizah Huyno ∙ 8 MB Marga Altea ∙ 9 OH Mishka Fernandez ∙ 10 OH Xyza Gula
11 OP Julia Balingit ∙ 12 MB Iya Penuliar ∙ 14 L Pau Escober ∙ 15 S Arlene Waje ∙ 16 S Cassie Carballo ∙ 17 OH Angge Poyos ∙ 19 MB Mae Coronado
20 MB Em Banagua ∙ 21 OH Kyla Cordora ∙ 22 MB Bianca Plaza ∙ 23 S Anya Acojedo ∙ 24 S Guen Angela Silang ∙ 25 MB Blessing Unekwe
Shaq delos Santos, coach

2025 Shakey's Super League Preseason Unity Cup
2 OH Bien Arasan ∙ 4 L Detdet Pepito, C ∙ 5 OP Avril Bron ∙ 6 MB Kaizah Huyno ∙ 8 MB Marga Altea ∙ 9 OH Mishka Fernandez ∙ 10 OH Xyza Gula
11 OP Julia Balingit ∙ 12 MB Iya Penuliar ∙ 14 L Pau Escober ∙ 15 S Arlene Waje ∙ 16 S Cassie Carballo ∙ 17 OH Angge Poyos ∙ 18 OP Regina Jurado
19 MB Mae Coronado ∙ 20 MB Em Banagua ∙ 21 OH Kyla Cordora ∙ 24 S Guen Angela Silang ∙ 25 MB Blessing Unekwe
Shaq delos Santos, coach

=== Fixtures and results ===
==== 2025 UAAP Kickoff Party Exhibition Game ====
| No. | Date | Time | Location | Opponent | Result | Record | Set scores | | | |
| No. | Date | Time | Location | Opponent | Result | Record | 1 | 2 | 3 | 4 |
|---|---|---|---|---|---|---|---|---|---|---|
| 1 | Sep 12 | 6:00 pm PHT | UST QPav | Petro Gazz Angels | W 3–1 | 1–0 | 25–21 | 25–19 | 25–27 | 25–19 |

Source: UST Tiger Radio

==== 2025 Shakey's Super League Preseason Unity Cup ====
| No. | Date | Time | Location | Opponent | Result | Record | Set scores | | | | |
| No. | Date | Time | Location | Opponent | Result | Record | 1 | 2 | 3 | 4 | 5 |
|---|---|---|---|---|---|---|---|---|---|---|---|
| 1 | Sep 21 | 12:00 pm PHT | Filoil EcoOil Centre | UP Fighting Maroons | L 2–3 | 0–1 | 22–25 | 25–18 | 19–25 | 25–18 | 12–15 |
| 2 | Sep 28 | 12:00 pm PHT | Filoil EcoOil Centre | Letran Lady Knights | W 3–1 | 1–1 | 25–16 | 22–25 | 25–23 | 25–17 | – |
| 3 | Oct 9 | 4:41 pm PHT | Rizal Memorial Coliseum | Mapúa Lady Cardinals | W 3–0 | 2–1 | 25–19 | 25–17 | 25–22 | – | |
| 4 | Oct 11 | 5:54 pm PHT | Rizal Memorial Coliseum | FEU Lady Tamaraws | W 3–0 | 3–1 | 25–16 | 25–18 | 25–15 | – | |
| 5 | Oct 12 | 5:00 pm PHT | Rizal Memorial Coliseum | Benilde Lady Blazers | W 3–0 | 4–1 | 25–19 | 25–20 | 25–23 | – | |
| 6 | Oct 17 | 4:29 pm PHT | San Andres Sports Complex | San Beda Red Lionesses | W 3–0 | 5–1 | 25–21 | 25–9 | 25–17 | – | |
Quarterfinal game
| 7 | Oct 21 | 1:00 pm PHT | San Andres Sports Complex | Ateneo Blue Eagles | W 3–0 | 6–1 | 25–16 | 25–21 | 25–21 | – | |
Semifinal game
| 8 | Oct 26 | 6:17 pm PHT | Ninoy Aquino Stadium | Adamson Lady Falcons | W 3–0 | 7–1 | 25–22 | 25–22 | 25–20 | – | |
Finals
| 9 | Nov 8 | 5:30 pm PHT | Rizal Memorial Coliseum | NU Lady Bulldogs | L 2–3 | 7–2 | 25–15 | 23–25 | 17–25 | 25–13 | 12–15 |
| 10 | Nov 15 | 4:54 pm PHT | Rizal Memorial Coliseum | NU Lady Bulldogs | L 2–3 | 7–3 | 25–22 | 22–25 | 27–25 | 23–25 | 10–15 |

Source: Shakey's Super League

==== 2025 Marinera Cup ====
| No. | Date | Time | Location | Opponent | Result | Record | Set scores | | |
| No. | Date | Time | Location | Opponent | Result | Record | 1 | 2 | 3 |
|---|---|---|---|---|---|---|---|---|---|
| 1 | Nov 12 | 3:00 pm PHT | JSU-Amosup Sports Complex | JRU Lady Bombers | W 3–0 | 1–0 | 25–17 | 25–9 | 25–18 |
| 2 | Nov 23 | 10:00 am PHT | JSU-Amosup Sports Complex | San Beda Red Lionesses–2 | W 3–0 | 2–0 | 25–17 | 25–19 | 25–21 |
| 3 | Nov 26 | 3:00 pm PHT | JSU-Amosup Sports Complex | EAC Lady Generals | W 3–0 | 3–0 | 25–12 | 25–13 | 25–15 |
| 4 | Nov 30 | 5:00 pm PHT | JSU-Amosup Sports Complex | Enderun Lady Titans | W 3–0 | 4–0 | 25–20 | 25–10 | 25–12 |
Semifinal game
| 5 | Dec 2 | 6:00 pm PHT | JSU-Amosup Sports Complex | Perpetual Lady Altas | W 3–0 | 5–0 | 25–12 | 25–19 | 25–22 |
Championship game
| 6 | Dec 5 | 6:00 pm PHT | JSU-Amosup Sports Complex | San Beda Red Lionesses–1 | W 3–0 | 6–0 | 25–18 | 25–19 | 25–17 |

Source: Marinera Cup

== Awards ==
=== Team ===
- UAAP

Champions:
- 1974
- 1975
- 1976
- 1984
- 1985
- 1986
- 1987
- 1988
- 1989
- 1990
- 1992
- 1993
- 1996
- 1997
- 2007
- 2010
Runners-up:
- 1980
- 1994
- 1995
- 1999
- 2002
- 2004
- 2011
- 2019
- 2024
3rd place:
- 1991
- 2001
- 2003
- 2008
- 2009
- 2012
- 2017
- 2025
- 2026

- Shakey's Super League Collegiate Tournament

Runners-up:
- 2023
- 2025

- V-League Collegiate Challenge

Champions: 2024

- Shakey's V-League

1st Conference champions:
- 2004
- 2007
- 2009
- 2010
2nd Conference champions:
- 2007
- 2009
1st Conference runners-up:
- 2005
- 2012
2nd Conference runners-up:
- 2005
- 2008
1st Conference 3rd place: 2013

- Philippine University Games

Champions:
- 2009
- 2010
- 2013
- 2016
- 2017
- 2018
Runners-up:
- 2000
- 2006
3rd place:
- 2008
- 2019

- PRISAA Volleyball tournament

Champions: 2002

- National Collegiate tournament

Champions:
- 1985
- 1990
- 1991
- 1993
Runners-up: 1989

- National Intercollegiate tournament

Champions:
- 1986
- 1987
- 1988
- 1993
- 2000
- 2004
- 2006
- 2008
Runners-up:
- 1994
- 2001
- 2007

- National Open Championship

Champions:
- 1992
- 2002
Runners-up: 1993

- Marinera Cup

Champions: 2025

- Shakey's Super League National Invitationals

3rd place: 2023

- PVL Collegiate Conference

Runners-up: 2019

- Philippine Super Liga Collegiate Conference

Runners-up: 2018

- Home and Away Invitational League

Runners-up: 2004

- Girls Athletic League

Champions: 2002

=== Individual ===
- Josie Vasquez

1987 National Intercollegiate MVP

- Asther Paglinawan

1988 National Intercollegiate MVP

- Natalie Cruz

1990 National Collegiate MVP

- Roxanne Pimentel

1996 UAAP MVP
2004 V-League 2nd Conference Best Attacker
2005 V-League 1st & 2nd Conference Best Attacker

- Johanna Botor

1997 UAAP MVP

- Jocelyn Capati

2002 National Open MVP & Best Blocker
2002 PRISAA Best Blocker

- Joyce Pano

2002 PRISAA MVP & Best Attacker
2002 National Open Best Spiker
2004 V-League 1st Conference Best Server

- Lourdes Palomo

2002 National Open Best Setter
2006 National Intercollegiate Best Server

- Kate Co Yu Kang

2004 V-League 1st Conference Best Receiver

- Ging Balse

2004 UAAP Rookie of the Year
2006 National Collegiate MVP
2004, 2009 V-League 1st Conference MVP
2005 V-League 1st Conference Best Receiver
2005 V-League 2nd Conference Best Server
2007 V-League 1st Conference Finals MVP & Best Attacker
2008 UAAP Best Attacker
2008 National Intercollegiate MVP

- Lilet Mabbayad

2005 UAAP Rookie of the Year

- Rubie de Leon

2005 V-League 2nd Conference Best Server

- Anna Eliza Fulo

2006 National Intercollegiate Best Blocker

- Venus Bernal

2006, 2008 National Intercollegiate Best Attacker
2007 UAAP MVP & Best Scorer

- Denise Tan

2007 UAAP Best Setter

- Angelie Tabaquero

2008 National Intercollegiate Best Server

- Aiza Maizo

2008 V-League 2nd Conference Best Server
2009 UAAP Best Scorer & Best Attacker
2009 V-League 1st Conference Best Blocker
2009 V-League 2nd Conference MVP & Finals MVP
2010 V-League 1st Conference Finals MVP & Best Attacker
2011 UAAP Best Scorer & Best Receiver

- Rhea Dimaculangan

2009 V-League 1st Conference Finals MVP & Best Setter
2010 UAAP Finals MVP & Best Server

- Judy Caballejo

2012 V-League 1st Conference Best Server

- Maika Ortiz

2012 UAAP Best Attacker
2013 V-League 1st Conference Best Blocker

- Pam Lastimosa

2013 V-League 1st Conference Most Improved Player

- Dancel Dusaran

2014 V-League 1st Conference Best Digger

- Ria Meneses

2014 V-League 1st Conference Best Blocker
2015 UAAP Best Blocker

- EJ Laure

2014 V-League 1st Conference Best Scorer
2015 UAAP Rookie of the Year
2015 V-League Collegiate Conference 2nd Best Outside Hitter
2016 V-League Reinforced Conference 2nd Best Outside Hitter

- Tin Francisco

2018 PSL Collegiate Conference 2nd Best Middle Blocker

- Sisi Rondina

2018 UAAP Best Scorer
2019 UAAP Athlete of the Year, MVP & 2nd Best Outside Hitter

- Milena Alessandrini

2018 UAAP Rookie of the Year
2018 PSL Collegiate Conference Best Scorer

- Eya Laure

2018 PSL Collegiate Conference Best Opposite Hitter
2019 UAAP Rookie of the Year & 1st Best Outside Hitter
2022, 2023 UAAP Best Scorer

- Imee Hernandez

2019 PVL Collegiate Conference 2nd Best Middle Blocker

- Detdet Pepito

2022, 2023 Shakey’s Super League Collegiate Tournament Best Libero
2023 Shakey’s Super League National Invitationals Best Libero
2023, 2024 UAAP Best Libero
2024 V-League Collegiate Challenge Best Libero
2025 Marinera Cup Best Libero

- Angeline Poyos

2023 Shakey’s Super League National Invitationals 1st Best Outside Hitter
2023, 2024 Shakey’s Super League Collegiate Tournament 2nd Best Outside Hitter
2024 UAAP Rookie of the Year & 2nd Best Outside Hitter
2024 V-League Collegiate Challenge Conference MVP
2025 Marinera Cup Finals MVP
2026 UAAP Best Attacker

- Cassie Carballo

2024 UAAP Best Setter
2024 V-League Collegiate Challenge Best Setter & Finals MVP
2025 Marinera Cup Best Setter

- Regina Jurado

2024 V-League Collegiate Challenge Best Opposite Hitter
2025 Shakey’s Super League Collegiate Tournament Best Opposite Hitter

- Em Banagua

2024 V-League Collegiate Challenge 2nd Best Middle Blocker

- Marga Altea

2025 Shakey’s Super League Collegiate Tournament 2nd Best Middle Blocker
2025 Marinera Cup 1st Best Middle Blocker

- Xyza Gula

2025 Shakey’s Super League Collegiate Tournament 2nd Best Outside Hitter

== Notable players ==
=== Succession of team captains ===
| No. | Player | Year |
|---|---|---|
| 1 | Issa Ocampo | 1979 |
| 2 | Carmela Abella | 1986–87 |
| 3 | Roxanne Pimentel | 1996 |
| 4 | Kimberly Racaza | 1999–01 |
| 5 | Kate Co Yu Kang | 2004–05 |
| 6 | Anna Eliza Fulo | 2006 |
| 7 | Ging Balse | 2006–07 |
| 8 | Venus Bernal | 2008 |
| 9 | Aiza Maizo | 2009–11 |
| 10 | Maika Ortiz | 2011–12 |
| 11 | Rhea Dimaculangan | 2012 |
| 12 | Judy Caballejo | 2013 |
| 13 | Loren Lantin | 2014 |
| 14 | Pam Lastimosa | 2015 |
| 15 | EJ Laure | 2016 |
| 16 | Sisi Rondina | 2017 |
| 17 | Shannen Palec | 2018 |
| 18 | Sisi Rondina | 2019 |
| 19 | Alina Bicar | 2020–21 |
| 20 | Eya Laure | 2022–23 |
| 21 | Detdet Pepito | 2024–26 |

=== National team appearances ===
- Josie Vasquez

1985, 1987, 1993 Southeast Asian Games

- Jane Santos-Buquid

1987 Southeast Asian Games

- Mozzy Crisologo

1989 Southeast Asian Games

- Natalie Cruz

1989, 1993 Southeast Asian Games

- Annaliza Yu

1992 Asian Junior Championships

- Angeline Lim

1992 Asian Junior Championships

- Ma. Luisa Mejia

1992 Asian Junior Championships

- Elvira Garovillas

1993 Southeast Asian Games

- Joanne Tavera

1993 Southeast Asian Games

- Roxanne Pimentel

1993 World Junior Championships
1995, 2005 Southeast Asian Games
2006 FIVB World Qualifying

- Johanna Botor

1997 Asian Volleyball Championship
2005 Southeast Asian Games
2006 FIVB World Qualifying

- Joyce Pano

2000 Asian Junior Championships

- Lourdes Palomo

2000 Asian Junior Championships

- Rubie de Leon

2000 Asian Junior Championships
2003, 2005 Southeast Asian Games
2006 FIVB World Qualifying
2014 FIVB World Qualifying (captain)

- Ging Balse

2003 Southeast Asian Games
2005 Southeast Asian Games
2006 Asian Volleyball Championship

- Anna Eliza Fulo

2003 Southeast Asian Games
2006 Asian Volleyball Championship

- Kate Co Yu Kang

2005 Southeast Asian Games

- Aiza Maizo

2013, 2017 Asian Volleyball Championship
2017, 2019 Southeast Asian Games
2018 Asian Volleyball Cup
2019 ASEAN Grand Prix
2023 AVC Challenge Cup (captain)

- Angeli Tabaquero

2013 Asian Volleyball Championship (captain)

- Venus Bernal

2013 Asian Volleyball Championship

- Rhea Dimaculangan

2014 FIVB World Qualifying
2015, 2017, 2019 Southeast Asian Games
2017 Asian Volleyball Championship

- Maika Ortiz

2015, 2017 Southeast Asian Games
2014 FIVB World Qualifying
2017 Asian Volleyball Championship
2018 Asian Games
2018 Asian Volleyball Cup

- EJ Laure

2015 U23 Asian Volleyball Championship

- Ria Meneses

2015 U23 Asian Volleyball Championship
2022 Southeast Asian Games

- Eya Laure

2019, 2025 Southeast Asian Games
2019 ASEAN Grand Prix
2024 AVC Challenge Cup

- Ysa Jimenez

2019 U23 Kor Royal Cup

- KC Galdones

2019 U23 Kor Royal Cup

- Mafe Galanza

2019 U23 Kor Royal Cup

- Rachelle Roldan

2019 U23 Kor Royal Cup

- Cherry Rondina

2024 AVC Challenge Cup

== Past rosters ==
UST Lady Goldies–1988 UAAP champions
Natalie Cruz ∙ Asther Paglinawan ∙ Mozzy Crisologo ∙ Joanne Tavera ∙ Carmela Abella ∙ Myra Balaquiot ∙ Christine Evangelista
August Sta. Maria, coach

UST Lady Goldies–1989 UAAP champions
Natalie Cruz ∙ Carmela Abella ∙ Joanne Tavera ∙ Myra Balaquiot ∙ Mozzy Crisologo ∙ Annaliza Yu ∙ Julie Ogayon ∙ Carmen Gadionco ∙ Mylene Cuenca
Tina Ignacio ∙ Vilet Ponce de Leon
August Sta. Maria, coach

UST Lady Goldies–1992 UAAP champions
Annaliza Yu ∙ Angeline Lim ∙ Ma. Luisa Mejia ∙ Mylene Cuenca ∙ Ana May Calma ∙ Mila Rañada ∙ Eden Garovillas ∙ Elvira Garovillas
August Sta. Maria, coach

UST Golden Tigresses–1993 UAAP champions
Annaliza Yu ∙ Mila Rañada ∙ Roxanne Pimentel ∙ Mylene Cuenca ∙ Angeline Lim ∙ Ana May Calma ∙ Elvira Garovillas ∙ Ma. Luisa Mejia
August Sta. Maria, coach

UST Golden Tigresses–1996 UAAP champions
Raquel Balaquiot ∙ Johanna Botor ∙ Corinne Canonoy ∙ Annalyn Cortes ∙ Lorena dela Vega ∙ Bernadette Fernandez ∙ Mary Rose Deanne Goboli ∙ Carla Ann Jose
Rosalyn Labay ∙ Janice Namuco ∙ Roxanne Pimentel, C
August Sta. Maria, coach

UST Golden Tigresses–1997 UAAP champions
Kimberly Racaza ∙ Johanna Botor ∙ Rosalyn Labay ∙ Janice Namuco ∙ Corinne Canonoy ∙ Kristine Ann Dave ∙ Catherine Lim ∙ Irene Montessino
August Sta. Maria, coach

UST Golden Tigresses–2007 UAAP champions
1 OH Karla Cotoco ∙ 2 OH Angeli Tabaquero ∙ 3 OH Anne Lorraine Zapata ∙ 4 OH Mellisa Cu ∙ 5 MB Ging Balse, C ∙ 6 MB Lilet Mabbayad ∙ 7 OP Vida Rica Gutierrez
8 S Aiza Maizo ∙ 9 OH Kimberly Lazaro ∙ 10 OP Joanna Torrijos ∙ 11 OH Michelle del Rosario ∙ 12 OH Venus Bernal ∙ 14 S Denise Tan ∙ 15 L Cherry Ann Balse
August Sta. Maria, coach

UST Golden Tigresses–2010 UAAP champions
1 S Rhea Dimaculangan ∙ 2 OH Angeli Tabaquero ∙ 3 OH Michelle del Rosario ∙ 4 MB Hannah Mance ∙ 5 S Sarah Jane Gonzales ∙ 6 L Jessica Curato
7 L Jennifer Fortuno ∙ 8 OP Aiza Maizo, C ∙ 9 OH Maru Banaticla ∙ 10 MB Maika Ortiz ∙ 11 OH Judy Caballejo ∙ 12 OP Katrina Carangan ∙ 16 MB Dindin Santiago
18 OH Valerie Amar
Shaq delos Santos, coach

UST Golden Tigresses–2004 Shakey's V-League 1st conference champions
1 S Rubie de Leon ∙ 2 S Karen Co Yu Kang ∙ 4 MB Anna Eliza Fulo ∙ 5 MB Ging Balse ∙ 6 S Lourdes Palomo ∙ 7 MB Vida Rica Gutierrez ∙ 8 OH Joyce Pano
9 OP Kate Co Yu Kang, C ∙ 11 L Missy Cruz ∙ 12 OH Venus Bernal ∙ Jocelyn Capati ∙ Karen Valencia
August Sta. Maria, coach

UST Golden Tigresses–2007 Shakey's V-League 1st conference champions
1 S Rubie de Leon, guest ∙ 2 OH Angeli Tabaquero ∙ 3 OH Michelle del Rosario ∙ 4 MB Hannah Mance ∙ 5 MB Ging Balse ∙ 6 MB Lilet Mabbayad ∙ 7 OP Vida Rica Gutierrez
8 OP Aiza Maizo ∙ 9 OH Kimberly Lazaro ∙ 10 OP Nerissa Bautista, guest ∙ 11 MB Gian Carla Benedicto ∙ 12 OH Venus Bernal, C ∙ 14 S Denise Tan ∙ 15 L Cherry Ann Balse
August Sta. Maria, coach

UST Golden Tigresses–2007 Shakey's V-League 2nd conference champions
1 S Rhea Dimaculangan ∙ 2 OH Angeli Tabaquero ∙ 3 MB Sue Roces, guest ∙ 4 MB Hannah Mance ∙ 5 MB Ging Balse ∙ 6 OH Jessica Curato ∙ 7 OP Vida Rica Gutierrez
8 OP Aiza Maizo ∙ 9 L Kimberly Lazaro ∙ 10 OP Joanna Torrijos ∙ 11 OH Michelle del Rosario ∙ 12 OH Venus Bernal, C ∙ 14 S Denise Tan ∙ 15 OH Mellisa Cu
August Sta. Maria, coach

UST Golden Tigresses–2009 Shakey's V-League 1st conference champions
1 S Rhea Dimaculangan ∙ 2 MB Maika Ortiz ∙ 3 OH Michelle del Rosario ∙ 4 MB Hannah Mance ∙ 5 MB Ging Balse, guest ∙ 6 L Jessica Curato ∙ 7 OH Kimberly Lazaro
8 OP Aiza Maizo, C ∙ 9 OP Michelle Carolino, guest ∙ 10 OH Bernice Co ∙ 11 OH Judy Caballejo ∙ 12 OH Verlyn Bernal ∙ 18 S Sarah Jane Gonzales
Shaq delos Santos, coach

UST Golden Tigresses–2009 Shakey's V-League 2nd conference champions
1 S Rhea Dimaculangan ∙ 2 OH Angeli Tabaquero ∙ 3 OH Michelle del Rosario ∙ 4 MB Hannah Mance ∙ 5 S Sarah Jane Gonzales ∙ 6 L Jessica Curato ∙ 7 OH Kimberly Lazaro ∙ 8 OP Aiza Maizo, C ∙ 9 OH Maru Banaticla ∙ 10 MB Maika Ortiz ∙ 11 OH Judy Caballejo ∙ 12 MB Roxanne Pimentel, guest ∙ 14 OP Katrina Carangan ∙ 16 MB Dindin Santiago
Shaq delos Santos, coach

UST Golden Tigresses–2010 Shakey's V-League 1st conference champions
1 S Rhea Dimaculangan ∙ 2 OH Angeli Tabaquero ∙ 4 MB Hannah Mance ∙ 5 MB Ging Balse, guest ∙ 6 L Jessica Curato ∙ 8 OP Aiza Maizo, C ∙ 9 OH Maru Banaticla
10 MB Maika Ortiz ∙ 11 OH Judy Caballejo ∙ 12 S Sarah Jane Gonzales ∙ 14 OP Katrina Carangan ∙ 16 MB Dindin Santiago ∙ 18 OP Valerie Jen Amar
Shaq delos Santos, coach

UST Golden Tigresses–2024 V-League Collegiate Cup champions
1 OH Renren Peñafiel ∙ 2 OH Bien Arasan ∙ 3 OH Ashlee Knop ∙ 4 L Detdet Pepito, C ∙ 5 S Arlene Waje ∙ 6 MB Kaizah Huyno ∙ 7 L Francine Rameri ∙ 8 OP Marga Altea
9 OP Ysa Chua ∙ 11 MB Pia Abbu ∙ 12 MB Chin Osis ∙ 13 OH Jonna Perdido ∙ 14 L Pau Escober ∙ 16 S Cassie Carballo ∙ 17 OH Angge Poyos ∙ 18 OP Regina Jurado
19 MB Mae Coronado ∙ 20 MB Em Banagua ∙ 21 OH Kyla Cordora ∙ 25 MB Blessing Unekwe
Kungfu Reyes, coach

== See also ==
- UST Growling Tigers
- UAAP Volleyball Championship
- Shakey's V-League Notable Records
- La Salle–UST rivalry
- UST Golden Spikers volleyball
