= Kungfu Reyes =

Filipino volleyball coach

Personal information
- Full name: Emilio Reyes Jr.
- Nickname: Kungfu
- Nationality: Filipino
- Born: May 2, 1981 (age 45)
- Home town: Lucena, Quezon
- Education: University of Santo Tomas

Coaching information
- Current team: San Beda Lady Red Spikers
- Previous teams coached
- Years: Teams
- 2015–25; 2015–23; 2024; 2025–: UST Golden Tigresses; Philippine Army Lady Troopers; Chery Tiggo Crossovers; San Beda Lady Red Spikers

Volleyball information

Career
- Years: Team
- 2016: Philippine Army Troopers

Emilio "Kungfu" Reyes, Jr. (born May 2, 1981) is a Filipino volleyball coach and former player.

== Career ==
In the UAAP, Reyes played for the UST Golden Spikers, who won the title in Seasons 61, 63, and 65 (1999, 2001, and 2003), and finished as runners-up in Seasons 62 and 64 (2000 and 2002). After college, Reyes returned as a player and team captain of the Philippine Army Troopers, who were debuting in the 2016 Reinforced Conference of the Spikers' Turf.

== Coaching career ==
=== UST ===
Reyes started his coaching career in 2004 as an assistant to coach Francis Vicente of the UST Junior Tigresses. He became head coach of the girls team in 2013, helping them win four juniors titles.

In April 2015, Reyes became the head coach of the senior UST Golden Tigresses team, taking over from Odjie Mamon. As of 2024, Reyes is still coach of the team while simultaneously mentoring professional teams.

In June 2025, Reyes was reassigned a sports director of the women's and girls volleyball program.

=== Army Lady Troopers ===
While still UST coach, Reyes took a concurrent job as coach of the Philippine Army Lady Troopers in the Shakey's V-League in 2015. In the 2016 season, he briefly coached the RC Cola-Army Troopers in the Philippine Super Liga. Reyes followed the Lady Troopers when it left the SVL and joined the Premier Volleyball League (PVL). He left the Lady Troopers in the 2023 First All-Filipino Conference.

=== Cherry Tiggo Crossovers ===
In June 2023, Reyes joined the Chery Tiggo Crossovers as an assistant coach. He was elevated to head coach of the team for the 2024 All-Filipino Conference. He was later replaced by Norman Miguel in September 2024 and reassigned as an assistant coach.

=== San Beda ===
In June 2025, Reyes was appointed as head coach of the San Beda Lady Red Spikers of the NCAA.

== Personal life ==
Reyes is from Lucena, Quezon. He is part of the Philippine Army, with the rank of staff sergeant as of 2020. He is popularly known as Kungfu, a nickname given to him by his grandfather. Reyes explained that his grandfather compared him in his childhood to a "Shaolin master", due to his being fat, bald, and having slanted eyes.
