= 1993 UAAP Women's Volleyball =

- Teams: 8

The University Athletic Association of the Philippines (UAAP) holds its basketball tournaments, which were held from September to December. There were a total of 8 participating teams.

== Elimination round ==
FIRST ROUND OF ELIMINATIONS
JULY 25							JULY 29						
Game	Team	1st	2nd	3rd	4th	5th	Game	Team	1st	2nd	3rd	4th	5th
1st	University of the East	15	15	15	-	-	1st	University of the Philippines	11	6	10	-	-
1st	National University	9	10	12	-	-	1st	University of Santo Tomas	15	15	15	-	-
2nd	De La Salle University	12	17	13	12	-	2nd	Ateneo de Manila University	15	15	15	-	-
2nd	University of the Philippines	15	15	15	15	-	2nd	De La Salle University	7	4	5	-	-
3rd	Adamson University	15	13	13	15	17	3rd	National University	3	2	4	-	-
3rd	Far Eastern University	12	15	15	10	14	3rd	Adamson University	15	15	15	-	-
4th	University of Santo Tomas	16	15	15	-	-	4th	Far Eastern University	15	15	15	-	-
4th	Ateneo de Manila University	9	13	10	-	-	4th	University of the East	12	13	10	-	-
AUGUST 1							AUGUST 4						
Game	Team	1st	2nd	3rd	4th	5th	Game	Team	1st	2nd	3rd	4th	5th
1st	De La Salle University	14	15	17	13	12	1st	Adamson University	15	15	15	-	-
1st	University of the East	17	13	16	15	15	1st	University of the Philippines	5	8	4	-	-
2nd	University of Santo Tomas	15	13	15	17	-	2nd	National University	1	1	2	-	-
2nd	Adamson University	13	15	8	16	-	2nd	Ateneo de Manila University	15	15	15	-	-
3rd	University of the Philippines	15	15	15	-	-	3rd	Far Eastern University	15	15	15	-	-
3rd	National University	9	10	12	-	-	3rd	De La Salle University	2	3	10	-	-
4th	Ateneo de Manila University	15	12	17	16	16	4th	University of the East	3	7	3	-	-
4th	Far Eastern University	10	15	16	17	17	4th	University of Santo Tomas	15	15	15	-	-
AUGUST 8							AUGUST 12						
Game	Team	1st	2nd	3rd	4th	5th	Game	Team	1st	2nd	3rd	4th	5th
1st	University of Santo Tomas	15	15	15	-	-	1st	University of the East	12	16	17	15	17
1st	National University	0	1	0	-	-	1st	Adamson University	15	17	14	12	15
2nd	University of the Philippines	4	8	7	-	-	2nd	Far Eastern University	15	15	15	-	-
2nd	Far Eastern University	10	2	7	-	-	2nd	National University	1	5	2	-	-
3rd	Ateneo de Manila University	16	15	15	15	-	3rd	De La Salle University	9	6	6	-	-
3rd	University of the East	17	9	7	12	-	3rd	University of Santo Tomas	15	15	15	-	-
4th	De La Salle University	11	5	13	-	-	4th	Ateneo de Manila University	15	15	15	-	-
4th	Adamson University	15	15	15	-	-	4th	University of the Philippines	5	2	7	-	-
AUGUST 15
Game	Team	1st	2nd	3rd	4th	5th							
1st	National University	16	15	13	15	15							
1st	De La Salle University	17	11	15	12	12							
2nd	University of the Philippines	7	10	15	9	-							
2nd	University of the East	15	15	13	15	-							
3rd	Adamson University	15	8	6	7	-							
3rd	Ateneo de Manila University	9	15	15	15	-							
4th	University of Santo Tomas	16	14	15	15	-							
4th	Far Eastern University	17	17	13	17	-							
SECOND ROUND OF ELIMINATIONS
AUGUST 22							AUGUST 26						
Game	Team	1st	2nd	3rd	4th	5th	Game	Team	1st	2nd	3rd	4th	5th
1st	University of the Philippines	15	13	16	8	-	1st	National University	2	6	4	-	-
1st	De La Salle University	12	15	17	15	-	1st	University of Santo Tomas	15	15	15	-	-
2nd	Adamson University	15	15	15	-	-	2nd	De La Salle University	10	10	12	-	-
2nd	National University	9	8	9	-	-	2nd	University of the East	15	15	15	-	-
3rd	University of Santo Tomas	15	12	11	15	15	3rd	Ateneo de Manila University	15	15	15	-	-
3rd	Far Eastern University	10	15'	15	11	13	3rd	University of the Philippines	8	10	9	-	-
4th	University of the East	17	6	12	15	15	4th	Far Eastern University	15	17	15	-	-
4th	Ateneo de Manila University	15	15	15	12	13	4th	Adamson University	10	16	13	-	-
AUGUST 29							SEPTEMBER 1						
Game	Team	1st	2nd	3rd	4th	5th	Game	Team	1st	2nd	3rd	4th	5th
1st	Adamson University	15	15	15	-	-	1st	Far Eastern University	15	15	15	-	-
1st	De La Salle University	13	10	11	-	-	1st	University of the Philippines	7	3	2	-	-
2nd	University of the Philippines	15	15	15	-	-	2nd	De La Salle University	12	13	6	-	-
2nd	National University	10	6	7	-	-	2nd	University of Santo Tomas	15	15	15	-	-
3rd	University of the East	15	15	11	7	14	3rd	Ateneo de Manila University	15	15	15	-	-
3rd	Far Eastern University	12	13	15	15	17	3rd	National University	4	0	1	-	-
4th	University of Santo Tomas	17	15	15	14	15	4th	Adamson University	8	12	17	15	17'
4th	Ateneo de Manila University	16	17	11	17	13	4th	University of the East	15	15	15	13	16
SEPTEMBER 4							SEPTEMBER 7						
Game	Team	1st	2nd	3rd	4th	5th	Game	Team	1st	2nd	3rd	4th	5th
1st	Far Eastern University	15	15	15	-	-	1st	Far Eastern University	15	15	15	-	-
1st	De La Salle University	7	8	4	-	-	1st	National University	0	0	0	-	-
2nd	Ateneo de Manila University	13	13	15	15	11	2nd	University of the East	12	10	15	15	14
2nd	Adamson University	15	15	12	13	15	2nd	University of the Philippines	15	15	12	11	17
3rd	University of Santo Tomas	15	15	15	-	-	3rd	Adamson University	7	7	9	-	-
3rd	University of the Philippines	12	12	12	-	-	3rd	University of Santo Tomas	15	15	15	-	-
4th	University of the East	15	15	15	-	-	4th	De La Salle University	7	4	7	-	-
4th	National University	4	11	7	-	-	4th	Ateneo de Manila University	15	15	15	-	-
SEPTEMBER 12
Game	Team	1st	2nd	3rd	4th	5th							
1st	National University	13	12	13	-	-							
1st	De La Salle University	15	15	15	-	-							
2nd	University of the Philippines	3	3	7	-	-							
2nd	Adamson University	15	15	15	-	-							
3rd	University of Santo Tomas	15	15	15	-	-							
3rd	University of the East	7	12	9	-	-							
4th	Ateneo de Manila University	17	15	15	-	-							
4th	Far Eastern University	14	12	13	-	-							
END OF FIRST ROUND OF ELIMINATIONS

== Postseason ==
POST-SEASON TOURNAMENT
FINAL FOUR GAME 1 - SEPTEMBER 14
Game	Team	1st	2nd	3rd	4th	5th
1st	Far Eastern University	12	13	15	7	-
1st	Adamson University	15	15	13	15	
2nd	Ateneo de Manila University	15	15	15	-	-
2nd	University of Santo Tomas	12	11	12	-	-
FINAL FOUR GAME 2 - SEPTEMBER 16
Game	Team	1st	2nd	3rd	4th	5th
1st	Adamson University	5	7	11	-	-
1st	Far Eastern University	15	15	15	-	-
2nd	University of Santo Tomas	13	17	13	17	17
2nd	Ateneo de Manila University	15	14	15	16	16
FINALS GAME 1 - SEPTEMBER 19
1st	Far Eastern University	13	9	11	-	-
1st	University of Santo Tomas	15	15	15	-	-
FINALS GAME 2 - SEPTEMBER 25
1st	University of Santo Tomas	15	15	15	-	-
1st	Far Eastern University	8	6	9	-	-

Preceded by Season 55 (1992)	UAAP volleyball seasons Season 56 (1993) volleyball	Succeeded by Season 57 (1994)
