= Turkmenistan men's national volleyball team =

National sports team

Turkmenistan
- Association: Turkmenistan Volleyball Federation (TVF)
- Confederation: AVC
- Head coach: Tachnazarov Serdar
- FIVB ranking: 69 ▲9 (1 October 2026)

Uniforms
Home	Away

Asian Championship
- Appearances: 2 (First in 2011)
- Best result: 14th (2011)
Honours
CAVA Nations League
Silver medal – second place	2024 Islamabad	Team

The Turkmenistan men's national volleyball team represents Turkmenistan in international volleyball competitions and friendly matches. The team is directed by the Turkmenistan Volleyball Federation (TVF), the governing body for volleyball in Turkmenistan, which represents the country in international competitions and friendly matches.

The team is currently ranked 67th in the world.

== Competition record ==
=== Asian Championship ===
Asian Championship record
Year	Round	Position	GP	MW	ML	SW	SL	Squad
1975–1991	Part of Soviet Union							
(Thailand) 1993	Did not participate							
(South Korea) 1995	Did not participate							
(Qatar) 1997	Did not participate							
(Iran) 1999	Did not participate							
(South Korea) 2001	Did not participate							
(China) 2003	Did not participate							
(Thailand) 2005	Did not participate							
(Indonesia) 2007	Did not participate							
(Philippines) 2009	Did not participate							
(Iran) 2011	13th–16th places	14th place	7	2	5	9	17	Squad
(United Arab Emirates) 2013	Did not participate							
(Iran) 2015	13th–16th places	16th place	7	0	7	5	21	Squad
(Indonesia) 2017	Did not participate							
(Iran) 2019	Did not participate							
(Japan) 2021	Did not participate							
(Iran) 2023	Did not participate							
(Japan) 2026	Did not participate							
Total	0 Titles	2/23	14	2	12	14	38	—

=== Asian Games ===
- (China) 2010 — 15th place
- (South Korea) 2014 — 13th place

=== CAVA Nations League ===
- (Kyrgyzstan) 2023 — 5th place
- (Pakistan) 2024 — (silver) Runners-up
- (Uzbekistan) 2025 — 6th place

=== CAVA Challenge Cup ===
- (Uzbekistan) 2024 — (bronze) 3rd place
