= Kim Se-jin (volleyball) =

South Korean volleyball player (born 1974)

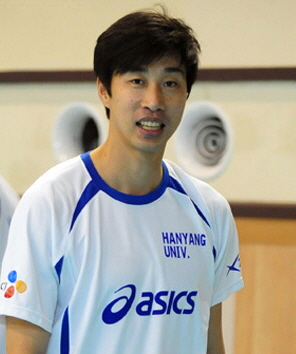
- Kim Se-jin in 2011

Personal information
- Full name: Kim Se-jin
- Nationality: South Korea
- Born: January 30, 1974 (age 52); Okcheon, Chungcheongbuk-do, South Korea
- Height: 1.97 m (6 ft 6 in)
- Weight: 93 kg (205 lb)

Coaching information
- Current team: (South Korea) OK Savings Bank
Previous teams coached
| Years | Teams |
|---|---|
| 2013– | (South Korea) OK Savings Bank |

Volleyball information
- Position: Opposite hitter

Career
| Years | Teams |
|---|---|
| 1995–2006 | (South Korea) Samsung Fire Bluefangs |

National team
| 1992–2003 | South Korea |
Honours
Representing South Korea
Men's volleyball
Asian Games
| Gold medal – first place | 2002 Busan | Team |
| Silver medal – second place | 1998 Bangkok | Team |
| Bronze medal – third place | 1994 Hiroshima | Team |
Asian Men's Volleyball Championship
| Gold medal – first place | 2003 Tianjin | Team |
| Gold medal – first place | 2001 Changwon | Team |
| Gold medal – first place | 1993 Korat | Team |
| Bronze medal – third place | 1999 Tehran | Team |
| Bronze medal – third place | 1995 Seoul | Team |
Asian Men's U20 Volleyball Championship
| Gold medal – first place | 1992 Tehran | Team |
- Last updated: March 1, 2015

Kim Se-jin (Korean: 김세진; born January 30, 1974) is a retired volleyball player from South Korea, who currently coaches the Ansan OK Savings Bank in V-League. As a player Kim competed with the South Korean national team from 1992 to 2003 and took part in the 1992, 1996 and 2000 Olympics. At the 1994 World League Kim was honored as best spiker with the 52.08% success percentage in attack (349 successful attacks for 670 attempts). Since 2013, he has been managing the Ansan OK Savings Bank volleyball team as head coach, winning the V-League twice in the 2014-15 and 2015–16 season.

== Awards ==
- 1994 FIVB World League "Best Spiker"
- 1999 Asian Volleyball Championship "Best Blocker"
