= AVC Men's Volleyball Continental Championship =

Indoor volleyball competition for men's national teams

- Upcoming season or competition: 2026 AVC Men's Volleyball Continental Championship
- Formerly: Asian Men's Volleyball Championship (1975–2023)
- Sport: Volleyball
- Founded: 1975; 51 years ago
- First season: 1975
- No. of teams: 12
- Continents: Asia and Oceania (AVC)
- Most recent champions: Japan (11th title)
- Most titles: Japan (11 titles)
- Broadcaster: VBTV
- Website: asianvolleyball.net

The AVC Men's Volleyball Continental Championship (formerly known as the Asian Men's Volleyball Championship) is an international volleyball competition in Asia and Oceania. It is organized by the sport's continental governing body, the Asian Volleyball Confederation (AVC), and is contested by the senior men's national teams of its member nations.

The tournament serves as the primary continental qualification pathway to determine Asian representatives for major global events organized by the Fédération Internationale de Volleyball (FIVB), such as the FIVB Men's Volleyball World Cup and the Olympic Games.

First established in Australia in 1975, the competition was initially held on a quadrennial basis before transitioning to a biennial format in 1987. Most recently, the tournament cycle was adjusted to even-numbered years beginning in 2026, aligning with the FIVB's newly implemented global volleyball calendar for 2025–2028.

Between its inception and the 2023 edition, the tournament has been held 22 times, featuring a total of 38 national teams. Throughout its history, only five nations have captured the championship title: Japan holds the record with 10 titles, followed by South Korea and Iran with four titles each, China with three, and Australia with one.

The reigning champions are Japan, who secured their record-extending evelenth title at the 2026 tournament held in Kitakyushu, Japan.

== History ==
The inaugural tournament, originally established as the Asian Men's Volleyball Championship, was hosted in Melbourne, Australia, in 1975. Initially, the Asian Volleyball Confederation (AVC) organized the competition on a quadrennial basis. In 1987, the tournament transitioned to a biennial cycle held in odd-numbered years to better align with the international volleyball calendar.

Throughout its history, the championship has functioned as the primary continental qualification pathway for major global tournaments governed by the Fédération Internationale de Volleyball (FIVB). From its early editions through the early 1990s, the tournament served as a direct Olympic qualification event for Asian teams. In subsequent decades, it acted as a continental qualifier for the now-defunct FIVB Men's Volleyball World Cup, which in turn served as a global qualification step for the Olympic Games. Furthermore, between 1993 and 2013, the tournament winners were awarded a continental berth to compete in the quadrennial FIVB World Grand Champions Cup.

Following a commercial partnership between the AVC and Volleyball World, first signed in 2022 and later extended through 2052, the tournament was officially rebranded as the AVC Men's Volleyball Continental Championship in 2026. This edition also marked the first to be officially sanctioned by Volleyball World, coinciding with the shift to even-numbered years under the FIVB's 2025–2032 global calendar. The stakes of the competition were significantly upgraded; the tournament now serves as a direct qualifier, awarding the champions an automatic berth to the 2028 Summer Olympics and the top three teams spots in the 2027 FIVB Men's Volleyball World Cup.

== Competition formula ==
=== Qualification ===
Beginning with the 2026 edition, a total of twelve teams compete in the tournament. The qualification process is structured to ensure continental representation, with berths distributed through four criteria:

- Two automatic berths are granted to the host nation and the defending champions.
- One berth is awarded to the winners of the AVC Men's Volleyball Cup.
- Five berths are allocated to the five AVC-affiliated zonal associations with each zone receiving one berth decided via zonal qualification tournaments.
- Four berths are assigned based on the FIVB Senior World Rankings.

=== Final tournament ===
Beginning with the 2026 edition, the tournament is split into two main phases:

- Preliminary phase: The twelve teams are divided into three pools of four (Pools A, B, and C) and play a single round-robin. Pool standings are determined by match wins, followed by match points, set ratio, points ratio, and head-to-head results.
- Final phase: The top two teams from each pool and the two best third-placed teams advance to the quarterfinals. The quarterfinal matchups are determined by a combined ranking of the eight advancing teams. From this point, the tournament uses a single-elimination knockout bracket consisting of quarterfinals, semifinals, and the gold medal match, alongside a bronze medal match for the semifinal losers.

== Results summary ==
=== Finals ===
#	Year	Host	Final			3rd place match			Teams
#	Year	Host	Champions	Score	Runners-up	3rd place	Score	4th place	Teams
1	1975; Details	(Australia); Melbourne	Japan	Round-robin	South Korea	China	Round-robin	Australia	7
2	1979; Details	(Bahrain); Manama	China	Round-robin	South Korea	Japan	Round-robin	Australia	15
3	1983; Details	(Japan); Tokyo	Japan	Round-robin	China	South Korea	Round-robin	Chinese Taipei	11
4	1987; Details	Kuwait City	Japan	3–0	China	South Korea	3–0	Kuwait	17
5	1989; Details	(South Korea); Seoul	South Korea	3–0	Japan	China	3–2	Pakistan	19
6	1991; Details	(Australia); Perth	Japan	Round-robin	South Korea	China	Round-robin	Australia	15
7	1993; Details	(Thailand); Nakhon Ratchasima	South Korea	3–0	Kazakhstan	Japan	3–2	China	16
8	1995; Details	(South Korea); Seoul	Japan	Round-robin	China	South Korea	Round-robin	Iran	14
9	1997; Details	(Qatar); Doha	China	Round-robin	Japan	Australia	Round-robin	Chinese Taipei	17
10	1999; Details	(Iran); Tehran	China	Round-robin	Australia	South Korea	Round-robin	Japan	14
11	2001; Details	(South Korea); Changwon	South Korea	3–1	Australia	Japan	3–1	China	12
12	2003; Details	(China); Tianjin	South Korea	Round-robin	China	Iran	Round-robin	Australia	15
13	2005; Details	(Thailand); Suphan Buri	Japan	3–0	China	South Korea	3–1	India	18
14	2007; Details	(Indonesia); Jakarta	Australia	Round-robin	Japan	South Korea	Round-robin	China	17
15	2009; Details	(Philippines); Manila	Japan	3–1	Iran	South Korea	3–1	China	18
16	2011; Details	(Iran); Tehran	Iran	3–1	China	South Korea	3–1	Australia	16
17	2013; Details	(United Arab Emirates); Dubai	Iran	3–0	South Korea	China	3–1	Japan	21
18	2015; Details	(Iran); Tehran	Japan	3–1	Iran	China	3–2	Qatar	16
19	2017; Details	(Indonesia); Gresik	Japan	3–1	Kazakhstan	South Korea	3–0	Indonesia	16
20	2019; Details	(Iran); Tehran	Iran	3–0	Australia	Japan	3–1	South Korea	16
21	2021; Details	(Japan); Chiba / Funabashi	Iran	3–0	Japan	China	3–0	Chinese Taipei	16
22	2023; Details	(Iran); Urmia	Japan	3–0	Iran	Qatar	3–0	China	17
23	2026; Details	(Japan); Kitakyushu	Japan	3–0	Iran	South Korea	3–2	Australia	12

=== Performances by country ===
Team	Champions	Runners-up	3rd place	4th place	Total
Japan	11	4	4	2	21
South Korea	4	4	10	1	19
Iran	4	4	1	1	10
China	3	6	6	5	20
Australia	1	3	1	6	11
Kazakhstan	0	2	0	0	2
Qatar	0	0	1	1	2
Chinese Taipei	0	0	0	3	3
Kuwait	0	0	0	1	1
Pakistan	0	0	0	1	1
India	0	0	0	1	1
Indonesia	0	0	0	1	1

=== Performances by zonal association ===
Zonal association	Champions	Runners-up	3rd place	4th place	Total
EAVA (East Asia)	18	14	20	11	63
CAVA (Central Asia)	4	6	1	3	14
OZVA (Oceania)	1	3	1	5	10
WAVA (West Asia)	0	0	1	2	3
SAVA (Southeast Asia)	0	0	0	1	1

== Medal summary ==
Rank	Nation	Gold	Silver	Bronze	Total
1	Japan	11	4	4	19
2	South Korea	4	4	10	18
3	Iran	4	4	1	9
4	China	3	6	6	15
5	Australia	1	3	1	5
6	Kazakhstan	0	2	0	2
7	Qatar	0	0	1	1
Totals (7 entries)		23	23	23	69

== National team appearances ==
=== Comprehensive team results ===
Year Team	(Australia) 1975 (7)	(Bahrain) 1979 (15)	(Japan) 1983 (11)	(Kuwait) 1987 (17)	(South Korea) 1989 (19)	(Australia) 1991 (15)	(Thailand) 1993 (16)	(South Korea) 1995 (14)	(Qatar) 1997 (17)	(Iran) 1999 (14)	(South Korea) 2001 (12)	(China) 2003 (15)	(Thailand) 2005 (18)	(Indonesia) 2007 (17)	(Philippines) 2009 (18)	(Iran) 2011 (16)	(United Arab Emirates) 2013 (21)	(Iran) 2015 (16)	(Indonesia) 2017 (16)	(Iran) 2019 (16)	(Japan) 2021 (16)	(Iran) 2023 (17)	(Japan) 2026 (12)	Total
Afghanistan	•	•	•	•	•	•	•	•	•	•	•	•	•	•	•	15th	20th	•	•	•	•	14th	•	3
Australia	4th	4th	6th	11th	10th	4th	6th	5th	3rd	2nd	2nd	4th	8th	1st	7th	4th	5th	5th	8th	2nd	6th	•	4th	22
Bahrain	•	14th	•	8th	16th	•	•	•	10th	10th	•	13th	10th	•	•	•	12th	12th	•	•	10th	8th	9th	12
Bangladesh	•	•	•	•	17th	•	16th	•	•	•	•	•	•	•	•	•	•	•	•	•	•	15th	•	3
China	3rd	1st	2nd	2nd	3rd	3rd	4th	2nd	1st	1st	4th	2nd	2nd	4th	4th	2nd	3rd	3rd	6th	6th	3rd	4th	6th	23
Chinese Taipei	•	•	4th	6th	9th	5th	10th	6th	4th	7th	6th	9th	13th	8th	8th	13th	9th	6th	7th	5th	4th	6th	7th	21
Hong Kong	•	•	10th	•	14th	•	•	•	•	•	12th	•	18th	•	17th	•	•	•	16th	16th	14th	16th	•	9
India	•	5th	5th	5th	6th	10th	9th	•	9th	9th	7th	5th	4th	9th	9th	6th	7th	11th	•	8th	9th	11th	8th	20
Indonesia	6th	•	9th	•	•	6th	•	•	•	6th	•	•	11th	7th	6th	11th	•	•	4th	12th	•	9th	•	11
Iran	•	6th	•	10th	8th	7th	5th	4th	6th	5th	5th	3rd	6th	5th	2nd	1st	1st	2nd	5th	1st	1st	2nd	2nd	21
Iraq	•	8th	•	9th	7th	•	•	•	•	•	•	•	•	•	•	•	13th	•	13th	•	•	12th	•	6
Japan	1st	3rd	1st	1st	2nd	1st	3rd	1st	2nd	4th	3rd	6th	1st	2nd	1st	5th	4th	1st	1st	3rd	2nd	1st	1st	23
Jordan	•	•	•	17th	•	•	•	•	•	•	•	•	•	•	•	•	•	•	•	•	•	•	•	1
Kazakhstan	•	•	•	•	•	•	2nd	14th	•	11th	9th	8th	•	10th	5th	9th	10th	9th	2nd	10th	11th	13th	•	14
Kuwait	•	7th	7th	4th	5th	•	14th	13th	•	14th	•	•	•	17th	•	•	17th	14th	•	15th	16th	•	•	12
Lebanon	•	13th	•	•	•	•	•	•	•	•	•	•	•	•	11th	•	8th	•	•	•	•	•	•	3
Macau	•	•	•	•	•	•	•	•	13th	•	•	•	•	•	•	•	•	•	•	•	•	•	•	1
Maldives	•	•	•	•	•	•	•	•	•	•	•	•	•	16th	18th	•	•	•	•	•	•	•	•	2
Myanmar	•	•	•	•	•	•	•	•	•	•	•	•	•	•	10th	•	18th	•	•	•	•	•	•	2
Nepal	•	•	11th	•	18th	•	•	•	•	•	•	•	•	•	•	•	•	•	•	•	•	•	•	2
New Zealand	7th	11th	8th	12th	12th	12th	11th	12th	•	•	•	14th	15th	•	•	•	•	•	•	•	•	•	12th	11
North Korea	•	•	•	•	•	11th	•	•	•	•	•	•	•	•	•	•	•	•	•	•	•	•	•	1
Oman	•	•	•	•	•	•	•	•	•	•	•	•	•	•	•	•	19th	15th	•	13th	•	•	10th	4
Pakistan	•	•	•	7th	4th	8th	8th	8th	7th	8th	•	7th	9th	13th	•	7th	•	10th	12th	7th	7th	7th	•	16
Philippines	5th	•	•	•	•	•	15th	11th	14th	•	•	•	14th	•	15th	•	•	•	•	•	•	•	•	6
Qatar	•	•	•	•	19th	•	12th	10th	8th	13th	11th	11th	7th	11th	14th	12th	11th	4th	9th	9th	5th	3rd	11th	18
Samoa	•	•	•	•	•	15th	•	•	•	•	•	•	•	•	•	•	•	•	•	•	•	•	•	1
Saudi Arabia	•	9th	•	13th	•	13th	•	•	12th	•	8th	12th	•	12th	•	•	21st	•	15th	•	12th	•	•	10
Singapore	•	12th	•	•	•	•	•	•	•	•	•	•	•	•	•	•	•	•	•	•	•	•	•	1
South Korea	2nd	2nd	3rd	3rd	1st	2nd	1st	3rd	5th	3rd	1st	1st	3rd	3rd	3rd	3rd	2nd	7th	3rd	4th	8th	5th	3rd	23
Sri Lanka	•	•	•	•	13th	•	13th	9th	15th	12th	•	•	•	14th	16th	8th	15th	13th	14th	14th	•	•	•	12
Syria	•	10th	•	•	•	•	•	•	•	•	•	•	•	•	•	•	•	•	•	•	•	•	•	1
Thailand	•	•	•	14th	15th	9th	7th	7th	11th	•	•	10th	5th	6th	13th	10th	6th	8th	11th	11th	15th	10th	5th	18
Turkmenistan	•	•	•	•	•	•	•	•	•	•	•	•	•	•	•	14th	•	16th	•	•	•	•	•	2
United Arab Emirates	•	•	•	15th	11th	14th	•	•	17th	•	10th	15th	17th	•	•	•	14th	•	•	•	•	•	•	8
Uzbekistan	•	•	•	•	•	•	•	•	16th	•	•	•	16th	•	•	16th	16th	•	•	•	13th	17th	•	6
Vietnam	•	•	•	•	•	•	•	•	•	•	•	•	12th	15th	12th	•	•	•	10th	•	•	•	•	4
Discontinued team
South Yemen	•	15th	•	16th	•	•	•	•	•	•	•	•	•	•	•	•	•	•	•	•	•	•	•	2

Legend
1st	Champions
2nd	Runners-up
3rd	3rd place
4th	4th place
Q	Qualified for upcoming tournament
••	Qualified but withdrew
•	Did not qualify
×	Withdrew before qualification / Banned by FIVB
	Hosts
	Did not enter
—N/a	Not a FIVB member

=== Debut of teams ===
Year	Debutants	Total
1975	Australia, China, Indonesia, Japan, New Zealand, Philippines, South Korea	7
1979	Bahrain, India, Iran, Iraq, Kuwait, Lebanon, Saudi Arabia, Singapore, South Yemen, Syria	10
1983	Chinese Taipei, Hong Kong, Nepal	3
1987	Jordan, Pakistan, Thailand, United Arab Emirates	4
1989	Bangladesh, Qatar, Sri Lanka	3
1991	North Korea, Samoa	2
1993	Kazakhstan	1
1995	None	0
1997	Macau, Uzbekistan	2
1999	None	0
2001	None	0
2003	None	0
2005	Vietnam	1
2007	Maldives	1
2009	Myanmar	1
2011	Afghanistan, Turkmenistan	2
2013	Oman	1
2015	None	0
2017	None	0
2019	None	0
2021	None	0
2023	None	0
2026	None	0

== Awards ==
=== Current awards ===
Year	Most Valuable Player
1979	(China) Wang Jiawei
1999	(Iran) Behnam Mahmoudi
2001	(South Korea) Shin Jin-sik
2003	(India) Yejju Subba Rao
2005	(Japan) Marcos Sugiyama
2007	(Australia) Dan Howard
2009	(Japan) Tatsuya Fukuzawa
2011	(Iran) Arash Kamalvand
2013	(Iran) Saeid Marouf
2015	(Japan) Kunihiro Shimizu
2017	(Japan) Yūki Ishikawa
2019	(Australia) Thomas Edgar
2019	(Iran) Saber Kazemi
2023	(Japan) Yūki Ishikawa

Year	Best Setter
1979	(South Korea) Kim Ho-chul
1999	(China) Zhou Jianan
2001	(South Korea) Choi Tae-woong
2003	(China) Wang Hebing
2005	(South Korea) Kwon Young-min
2007	(Japan) Kosuke Tomonaga
2009	(South Korea) Han Sun-soo
2011	(Iran) Amir Hosseini
2013	(Iran) Saeid Marouf
2015	(Japan) Hideomi Fukatsu
2017	(Japan) Naonobu Fujii
2019	(Iran) Saeid Marouf
2019	(Iran) Javad Karimi
2023	(Iran) Mohammad Taher Vadi

Year	Best Outside Spikers
2015	(Iran) Purya Fayazi
2015	(Iran) Hamzeh Zarini
2017	(Japan) Yūki Ishikawa
2017	(Kazakhstan) Vitaliy Vorivodin
2019	(Japan) Yūki Ishikawa
2019	(Australia) Samuel Walker
2021	(Iran) Milad Ebadipour
2021	(Japan) Yūki Ishikawa
2023	(Japan) Ran Takahashi
2023	(Qatar) Raimi Wadidie

Year	Best Middle Blockers
2015	(China) Zhang Zhejia
2015	(Iran) Mostafa Sharifat
2017	(Kazakhstan) Nodirkhan Kadirkhanov
2017	(Japan) Haku Ri
2019	(South Korea) Shin Yung-suk
2019	(Iran) Mohammad Mousavi
2021	(Iran) Aliasghar Mojarad
2021	(China) Li Yongzhen
2023	(Qatar) Belal Nabel Abunabot
2023	(Japan) Taishi Onodera

Year	Best Libero
2005	(South Korea) Yeo Oh-hyun
2007	(South Korea) Yeo Oh-hyun
2009	(South Korea) Yeo Oh-hyun
2011	(Iran) Farhad Zarif
2013	(Iran) Farhad Zarif
2015	(Japan) Daisuke Sakai
2017	(South Korea) Oh Jae-seong
2019	(Japan) Tomohiro Yamamoto
2021	(Iran) Mohammad Reza Hazratpour
2023	(China) Yang Yiming

Year	Best Opposite Spiker
2015	(Iran) Farhad Piroutpour
2017	(Indonesia) Rivan Nurmulki
2019	(Iran) Amir Ghafour
2021	(Japan) Kento Miyaura
2023	(Iran) Amin Esmaeilnejad

=== Former awards ===
Year	Best Scorer
1999	(Australia) Benjamin Hardy
2001	(Australia) Benjamin Hardy
2003	(Australia) Dan Howard
2005	(Japan) Yu Koshikawa
2007	(Iran) Mohammad Mohammadkazem
2009	(South Korea) Kim Yo-han
2011	(South Korea) Jeon Kwang-in
2013	(China) Zhong Weijun

Year	Best Spiker
1979	(South Korea) Kang Man-soo
1999	(Australia) Benjamin Hardy
2001	(South Korea) Lee Kyung-soo
2003	(India) Yejju Subba Rao
2005	(South Korea) Lee Sun-kyu
2007	(South Korea) Lee Kyung-soo
2009	(Indonesia) Andri Widiatmoko
2011	(Australia) Nathan Roberts
2013	(Iran) Amir Ghafour

Year	Best Blocker
1979	(China) Chen Gang
1999	(South Korea) Kim Se-jin
2001	(Australia) Dan Howard
2003	(India) Yejju Subba Rao
2005	(India) Yejju Subba Rao
2007	(South Korea) Lee Sun-kyu
2009	(Iran) Mohammad Mousavi
2011	(China) Liang Chunlong
2013	(Iran) Mohammad Mousavi

Year	Best Server
1979	(China) Xu Zhen
1999	(China) Zhu Gang
2001	(South Korea) Shin Jin-sik
2003	(China) Zheng Liang
2005	(South Korea) Lee Kyung-soo
2007	(Japan) Yu Koshikawa
2009	(South Korea) Kim Yo-han
2011	(South Korea) Kim Yo-han
2013	(China) Zhong Weijun

Year	Best Receiver
1999	(China) Li Tieming
2001	(South Korea) Yeo Oh-hyun
2003	(South Korea) Suk Jin-wook
2007	(Thailand) Siriphum Supachai
2009	(South Korea) Yeo Oh-hyun

Year	Best Digger
1999	(Japan) Koichi Nishimura
2001	(Japan) Kenji Yamamoto
2003	(South Korea) Yeo Oh-hyun

== See also ==
- AVC Women's Volleyball Continental Championship
- AVC Men's Volleyball Cup
- AVC Men's U20 Volleyball Championship
- AVC Boys' U18 Volleyball Championship
- AVC Boys' U16 Volleyball Championship
- Volleyball at the Asian Games
