= 1979 Asian Men's Volleyball Championship =

International volleyball tournament

Tournament details
- Host country: Bahrain
- City: Manama
- Dates: 16–23 December
- Teams: 14
- Venues: 2 (in 1 host city)

Final positions
- Champions: China (1st title)
- Runners-up: South Korea
- Third place: Japan
- Fourth place: Australia

Tournament awards
- MVP: (China) Wang Jiawei

The 1979 Asian Men's Volleyball Championship was the second staging of the Asian Men's Volleyball Championship, a quadrennial international volleyball tournament organised by the Asian Volleyball Confederation (AVC) with Bahrain Volleyball Association (BHV). The tournament was held in Manama, Bahrain from 16 to 23 December 1979.

== Pools composition ==
The teams are seeded based on their final ranking at the 1975 Asian Men's Volleyball Championship.

Pool A	Pool B	Pool C	Pool D
Bahrain (Host); Australia; Kuwait; New Zealand	Japan (1st); Iraq; Syria	South Korea (2nd); Iran; Singapore; South Yemen	China (3rd); Saudi Arabia; India; Lebanon

== Preliminary round ==
=== Pool A ===
Pos	Team	Pld	W	L	Pts	SW	SL	SR	SPW	SPL	SPR	Qualification
1	Australia	3	3	0	6	9	0	MAX	135	79	1.709	Semifinals
2	Kuwait	3	2	1	5	6	6	1.000	0	0	—	5th–8th place
3	New Zealand	3	1	2	4	4	8	0.500	0	0	—	9th–12th place
4	Bahrain	3	0	3	3	4	9	0.444	143	182	0.786	13th–15th place

Date		Score		Set 1	Set 2	Set 3	Set 4	Set 5	Total
16 Dec	New Zealand	3–2	Bahrain	12–15	15–12	15–5	14–16	15–10	71–58
17 Dec	Kuwait	3–1	New Zealand						
17 Dec	Bahrain	0–3	Australia	10–15	10–15	8–15			28–45
18 Dec	Australia	3–0	Kuwait	15–11	15–12	15–4			45–27
19 Dec	Kuwait	3–2	Bahrain	9–15	15–10	15–10	12–15	15–7	66–57
19 Dec	Australia	3–0	New Zealand	15–7	15–9	15–8			45–24

=== Pool B ===
Pos	Team	Pld	W	L	Pts	SW	SL	SR	SPW	SPL	SPR	Qualification
1	Japan	2	2	0	4	6	0	MAX	90	21	4.286	Semifinals
2	Iraq	2	1	1	3	3	5	0.600	80	105	0.762	5th–8th place
3	Syria	2	0	2	2	2	6	0.333	68	112	0.607	9th–12th place

Date		Score		Set 1	Set 2	Set 3	Set 4	Set 5	Total
17 Dec	Syria	0–3	Japan	0–15	2–15	6–15			8–45
18 Dec	Japan	3–0	Iraq	15–9	15–1	15–3			45–13
19 Dec	Iraq	3–2	Syria	15–4	11–15	10–15	16–14	15–12	67–60

=== Pool C ===
Pos	Team	Pld	W	L	Pts	SW	SL	SR	SPW	SPL	SPR	Qualification
1	South Korea	3	3	0	6	9	0	MAX	135	14	9.643	Semifinals
2	Iran	3	2	1	5	6	3	2.000	97	75	1.293	5th–8th place
3	Singapore	3	1	2	4	3	6	0.500	69	109	0.633	9th–12th place
4	South Yemen	3	0	3	3	0	9	0.000	32	135	0.237	13th–15th place

Date		Score		Set 1	Set 2	Set 3	Set 4	Set 5	Total
17 Dec	Singapore	3–0	South Yemen	15–8	15–6	15–5			45–19
17 Dec	South Korea	3–0	Iran	15–1	15–3	15–3			45–7
18 Dec	South Yemen	0–3	South Korea	2–15	0–15	1–15			3–45
18 Dec	Singapore	0–3	Iran	8–15	5–15	7–15			20–45
19 Dec	Iran	3–0	South Yemen	15–3	15–2	15–5			45–10
19 Dec	South Korea	3–0	Singapore	15–1	15–1	15–2			45–4

=== Pool D ===
Pos	Team	Pld	W	L	Pts	SW	SL	SR	SPW	SPL	SPR	Qualification
1	China	3	3	0	6	9	0	MAX	135	28	4.821	Semifinals
2	India	3	2	1	5	6	3	2.000	100	80	1.250	5th–8th place
3	Saudi Arabia	3	1	2	4	3	6	0.500	70	122	0.574	9th–12th place
4	Lebanon	3	0	3	3	0	9	0.000	60	135	0.444	13th–15th place

Date		Score		Set 1	Set 2	Set 3	Set 4	Set 5	Total
17 Dec	India	3–0	Saudi Arabia	15–9	15–3	15–7			45–19
17 Dec	China	3–0	Lebanon	15–6	15–3	15–3			45–12
18 Dec	Saudi Arabia	0–3	China	1–15	2–15	3–15			6–45
18 Dec	Lebanon	0–3	India	13–15	1–15	2–15			16–45
19 Dec	Saudi Arabia	3–0	Lebanon	15–6	15–13	15–13			45–32
19 Dec	China	3–0	India	15–3	15–3	15–4			45–10

== Final round ==
=== Classification 13th–15th ===
Pos	Team	Pld	W	L	Pts	SW	SL	SR	SPW	SPL	SPR
13	Lebanon	2	2	0	4	6	2	3.000	119	87	1.368
14	Bahrain	2	1	1	3	4	4	1.000	0	0	—
15	South Yemen	2	0	2	2	2	6	0.333	0	0	—

Date		Score		Set 1	Set 2	Set 3	Set 4	Set 5	Total
21 Dec	South Yemen	1–3	Lebanon	2–15	15–12	5–15	14–16		36–58
22 Dec	Lebanon	3–1	Bahrain	15–17	16–14	15–13	15–7		61–51
23 Dec	Bahrain	3–1	South Yemen						

=== Classification 9th–12th ===
Pos	Team	Pld	W	L	Pts	SW	SL	SR	SPW	SPL	SPR
9	Saudi Arabia	3	3	0	6	9	3	3.000	0	0	—
10	Syria	3	2	1	5	6	4	1.500	0	0	—
11	New Zealand	3	1	2	4	6	7	0.857	0	0	—
12	Singapore	3	0	3	3	2	9	0.222	0	0	—

Date		Score		Set 1	Set 2	Set 3	Set 4	Set 5	Total
21 Dec	Syria	3–0	Singapore	15–3	16–14	15–8			46–25
21 Dec	Saudi Arabia	3–2	New Zealand	15–5	15–12	8–15	12–15	15–6	65–53
22 Dec	Syria	0–3	Saudi Arabia	2–15	16–18	12–15			30–48
22 Dec	Singapore	1–3	New Zealand	12–15	15–10	2–15	10–15		39–55
23 Dec	New Zealand	1–3	Syria						
23 Dec	Singapore	1–3	Saudi Arabia						

=== Classification 5th–8th ===
Pos	Team	Pld	W	L	Pts	SW	SL	SR	SPW	SPL	SPR
5	India	3	3	0	6	9	1	9.000	0	0	—
6	Iran	3	1	2	4	6	7	0.857	0	0	—
7	Kuwait	3	1	2	4	4	7	0.571	0	0	—
8	Iraq	3	1	2	4	4	8	0.500	0	0	—

Date		Score		Set 1	Set 2	Set 3	Set 4	Set 5	Total
21 Dec	Iraq	3–2	Iran	16–14	7–15	15–2	2–15	15–9	55–55
21 Dec	India	3–0	Kuwait	15–4	15–5	15–1			45–10
22 Dec	India	3–0	Iraq	15–10	15–4	15–8			45–22
22 Dec	Kuwait	1–3	Iran	15–12	10–15	14–16	3–15		42–58
23 Dec	Kuwait	3–1	Iraq						
23 Dec	Iran	1–3	India						

=== Championship ===
Pos	Team	Pld	W	L	Pts	SW	SL	SR	SPW	SPL	SPR
1	China	3	3	0	6	9	1	9.000	145	66	2.197
2	South Korea	3	2	1	5	6	5	1.200	132	113	1.168
3	Japan	3	1	2	4	6	6	1.000	136	136	1.000
4	Australia	3	0	3	3	0	9	0.000	37	135	0.274

Date		Score		Set 1	Set 2	Set 3	Set 4	Set 5	Total
21 Dec	China	3–0	Australia	15–4	15–3	15–2			45–9
21 Dec	South Korea	3–2	Japan	11–15	8–15	15–9	15–11	15–7	64–57
22 Dec	Japan	1–3	China	15–10	3–15	10–15	6–15		34–55
22 Dec	South Korea	3–0	Australia	15–3	15–2	15–6			45–11
23 Dec	Australia	0–3	Japan	5–15	4–15	8–15			17–45
23 Dec	China	3–0	South Korea	15–3	15–10	15–10			45–23

== Final standing ==
Rank	Team
1st place, gold medalist(s)	China
2nd place, silver medalist(s)	South Korea
3rd place, bronze medalist(s)	Japan
4	Australia
5	India
6	Iran
7	Kuwait
8	Iraq
9	Saudi Arabia
10	Syria
11	New Zealand
12	Singapore
13	Lebanon
14	Bahrain
15	South Yemen

Qualified for the 1980 Summer Olympics (Later boycotted the Games)
Qualified for the 1980 World Olympic Qualifier
Qualified for the 1982 FIVB Volleyball Men's World Championship (China, South Korea and Japan pre-qualified; India later withdrew and replaced by Iraq)

1979 Asian Men's champions

China
1st title

== Awards ==
- MVP: (China) Wang Jiawei
- Best spiker: (South Korea) Kang Man-soo
- Best blocker: (China) Chen Gang
- Best server: (China) Xu Zhen
- Best setter: (South Korea) Kim Ho-chul
