= Samuel Walker (volleyball) =

Australian volleyball player (born 1995)

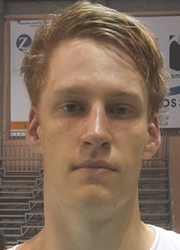
- Walker in 2014

Personal information
- Nationality: Australian
- Born: 19 February 1995 (age 31)
- Height: 208 cm (6 ft 10 in)
- Weight: 90 kg (198 lb)
- Spike: 350 cm (138 in)
- Block: 337 cm (133 in)

Volleyball information
- Number: 13 (national team)

Career
Years	Teams
2015	Corigliano Volley SSD ARL

National team
2014-	Australia
Honours
Representing Australia
Men's volleyball
Asian Championship
Silver medal – second place	2019 Tehran	Team

Samuel Walker (born 19 February 1995) is an Australian male volleyball player. He is part of the Australia men's national volleyball team. On club level he plays for Corigliano Volley SSD ARL.
