= 1989 Asian Men's Volleyball Championship =

International volleyball tournament

Tournament details
- Host country: South Korea
- City: Seoul
- Dates: 15–24 September
- Teams: 19
- Venues: 2 (in 1 host city)

Final positions
- Champions: South Korea (1st title)
- Runners-up: Japan
- Third place: China
- Fourth place: Pakistan

The Asian Men's Volleyball Championship was the fifth staging of the Asian Men's Volleyball Championship, a biennial international volleyball tournament organised by the Asian Volleyball Confederation (AVC) with Korea Volleyball Association (KVA). The tournament was held in Seoul, South Korea from 15 to 24 September 1989.

== Preliminary round ==
=== Pool A ===
Pos	Team	Pld	W	L	Pts	SW	SL	SR	SPW	SPL	SPR	Qualification
1	South Korea	4	4	0	8	12	0	MAX	180	54	3.333	Pool E
2	Iraq	4	3	1	7	9	6	1.500	191	183	1.044	Pool E
3	Thailand	4	2	2	6	8	6	1.333	163	162	1.006	Pool G
4	Bahrain	4	1	3	5	4	10	0.400	143	181	0.790	Pool G
5	Nepal	4	0	4	4	1	12	0.083	92	189	0.487	17th–19th place

Date		Score		Set 1	Set 2	Set 3	Set 4	Set 5	Total
16 Sep	South Korea	3–0	Bahrain	15–0	15–2	15–4			45–6
16 Sep	Thailand	3–0	Nepal	15–10	15–2	15–12			45–22
17 Sep	South Korea	3–0	Iraq	15–0	15–9	15–13			45–22
17 Sep	Thailand	3–0	Bahrain	15–8	15–13	15–9			45–30
18 Sep	Iraq	3–2	Thailand	15–7	6–15	12–15	15–13	15–8	63–58
18 Sep	Bahrain	3–1	Nepal	8–15	15–5	15–6	15–5		53–31
19 Sep	Iraq	3–0	Nepal	15–5	15–7	16–14			46–26
19 Sep	South Korea	3–0	Thailand	15–0	15–8	15–7			45–15
20 Sep	Iraq	3–1	Bahrain	15–11	15–13	15–17	15–13		60–54
20 Sep	South Korea	3–0	Nepal	15–4	15–5	15–2			45–11

=== Pool B ===
Pos	Team	Pld	W	L	Pts	SW	SL	SR	SPW	SPL	SPR	Qualification
1	Japan	4	4	0	8	12	0	MAX	180	32	5.625	Pool F
2	Pakistan	4	3	1	7	9	3	3.000	142	109	1.303	Pool F
3	United Arab Emirates	4	2	2	6	6	7	0.857	141	151	0.934	Pool H
4	New Zealand	4	1	3	5	4	9	0.444	101	168	0.601	Pool H
5	Bangladesh	4	0	4	4	0	12	0.000	77	181	0.425	17th–19th place

Date		Score		Set 1	Set 2	Set 3	Set 4	Set 5	Total
16 Sep	Japan	3–0	Pakistan	15–2	15–3	15–2			45–7
16 Sep	New Zealand	3–0	Bangladesh	15–11	15–6	16–14			46–31
17 Sep	Japan	3–0	New Zealand	15–1	15–1	15–1			45–3
17 Sep	United Arab Emirates	3–0	Bangladesh	15–6	15–11	15–6			45–23
18 Sep	Japan	3–0	United Arab Emirates	15–2	15–3	15–10			45–15
18 Sep	Pakistan	3–0	New Zealand	15–2	15–8	15–4			45–14
19 Sep	Pakistan	3–0	United Arab Emirates	15–13	15–13	15–8			45–34
19 Sep	Japan	3–0	Bangladesh	15–2	15–3	15–2			45–7
20 Sep	Pakistan	3–0	Bangladesh	15–9	15–4	15–3			45–16
20 Sep	United Arab Emirates	3–1	New Zealand	2–15	15–6	15–8	15–9		47–38

=== Pool C ===
Pos	Team	Pld	W	L	Pts	SW	SL	SR	SPW	SPL	SPR	Qualification
1	China	4	4	0	8	12	3	4.000	220	115	1.913	Pool E
2	Iran	4	3	1	7	10	3	3.333	162	122	1.328	Pool E
3	Chinese Taipei	4	2	2	6	7	6	1.167	174	140	1.243	Pool G
4	Australia	4	1	3	5	4	9	0.444	124	161	0.770	Pool G
5	Qatar	4	0	4	4	0	12	0.000	38	180	0.211	17th–19th place

Date		Score		Set 1	Set 2	Set 3	Set 4	Set 5	Total
16 Sep	Australia	3–0	Qatar	15–4	15–4	15–6			45–14
16 Sep	China	3–1	Chinese Taipei	14–16	15–9	16–14	15–11		60–50
17 Sep	China	3–0	Qatar	15–5	15–0	15–0			45–5
17 Sep	Iran	3–0	Chinese Taipei	15–13	15–10	15–11			45–34
18 Sep	Iran	3–0	Qatar	15–1	15–4	15–1			45–6
18 Sep	China	3–1	Australia	15–5	15–7	12–15	15–6		57–33
19 Sep	Iran	3–0	Australia	15–9	15–9	15–6			45–24
19 Sep	Chinese Taipei	3–0	Qatar	15–2	15–1	15–10			45–13
20 Sep	China	3–1	Iran	15–1	15–1	13–15	15–10		58–27
20 Sep	Chinese Taipei	3–0	Australia	15–8	15–10	15–4			45–22

=== Pool D ===
Pos	Team	Pld	W	L	Pts	SW	SL	SR	SPW	SPL	SPR	Qualification
1	India	3	3	0	6	9	0	MAX	135	50	2.700	Pool F
2	Kuwait	3	2	1	5	6	3	2.000	117	69	1.696	Pool F
3	Sri Lanka	3	1	2	4	3	6	0.500	72	114	0.632	Pool H
4	Hong Kong	3	0	3	3	0	9	0.000	46	137	0.336	Pool H

Date		Score		Set 1	Set 2	Set 3	Set 4	Set 5	Total
16 Sep	Kuwait	3–0	Sri Lanka	15–7	15–5	15–0			45–12
17 Sep	India	3–0	Hong Kong	15–5	15–3	15–2			45–10
18 Sep	Sri Lanka	3–0	Hong Kong	17–15	15–5	15–4			47–24
18 Sep	India	3–0	Kuwait	15–8	15–8	15–11			45–27
19 Sep	India	3–0	Sri Lanka	15–6	15–5	15–2			45–13
20 Sep	Kuwait	3–0	Hong Kong	15–5	15–2	15–5			45–12

== Classification round ==
- The results and the points of the matches between the same teams that were already played during the preliminary round shall be taken into account for the classification round.

=== Pool E ===
Pos	Team	Pld	W	L	Pts	SW	SL	SR	SPW	SPL	SPR	Qualification
1	South Korea	3	3	0	6	9	2	4.500	155	103	1.505	Semifinals
2	China	3	2	1	5	8	4	2.000	162	110	1.473	Semifinals
3	Iraq	3	1	2	4	3	7	0.429	94	144	0.653	5th–8th place
4	Iran	3	0	3	3	2	9	0.222	103	157	0.656	5th–8th place

Date		Score		Set 1	Set 2	Set 3	Set 4	Set 5	Total
21 Sep	China	3–0	Iraq	15–12	15–6	15–0			45–18
21 Sep	South Korea	3–0	Iran	15–4	15–6	15–12			45–22
22 Sep	Iraq	3–1	Iran	15–10	17–15	15–6	16–14		54–54
22 Sep	South Korea	3–2	China	10–15	15–6	10–15	15–10	15–13	65–59

=== Pool F ===
Pos	Team	Pld	W	L	Pts	SW	SL	SR	SPW	SPL	SPR	Qualification
1	Japan	3	3	0	6	9	0	MAX	0	0	—	Semifinals
2	Pakistan	3	2	1	5	6	5	1.200	0	0	—	Semifinals
3	India	3	1	2	4	4	6	0.667	0	0	—	5th–8th place
4	Kuwait	3	0	3	3	1	9	0.111	0	0	—	5th–8th place

Date		Score		Set 1	Set 2	Set 3	Set 4	Set 5	Total
21 Sep	Pakistan	3–1	India	8–15	16–14	15–12	15–13		54–54
21 Sep	Japan	3–0	Kuwait	15–5	15–9	15–8			45–22
22 Sep	Pakistan	3–1	Kuwait	7–15	15–9	15–8	16–14		53–46
22 Sep	Japan	3–0	India	15–10	15–8	15–4			45–22

=== Pool G ===
Pos	Team	Pld	W	L	Pts	SW	SL	SR	SPW	SPL	SPR	Qualification
1	Chinese Taipei	0	0	0	0	0	0	—	0	0	—	9th–12th place
2	Australia	0	0	0	0	0	0	—	0	0	—	9th–12th place
3	Thailand	0	0	0	0	0	0	—	0	0	—	13th–16th place
4	Bahrain	0	0	0	0	0	0	—	0	0	—	13th–16th place

=== Pool H ===
Pos	Team	Pld	W	L	Pts	SW	SL	SR	SPW	SPL	SPR	Qualification
1	United Arab Emirates	0	0	0	0	0	0	—	0	0	—	9th–12th place
2	New Zealand	0	0	0	0	0	0	—	0	0	—	9th–12th place
3	Sri Lanka	0	0	0	0	0	0	—	0	0	—	13th–16th place
4	Hong Kong	0	0	0	0	0	0	—	0	0	—	13th–16th place

== Final round ==
=== Classification 17th–19th ===
Pos	Team	Pld	W	L	Pts	SW	SL	SR	SPW	SPL	SPR
17	Bangladesh	0	0	0	0	0	0	—	0	0	—
18	Nepal	0	0	0	0	0	0	—	0	0	—
19	Qatar	0	0	0	0	0	0	—	0	0	—

=== Classification 13th–16th ===
13th–16th semifinals
23 September – Seoul
Sri Lanka	3
Bahrain
23 September – Seoul
Hong Kong	3
Thailand

13th place match
24 September – Seoul
Sri Lanka	3
Hong Kong
15th place match
24 September – Seoul
Bahrain	3
Thailand

=== Classification 9th–12th ===
9th–12th semifinals
23 September – Seoul
Chinese Taipei	3
New Zealand
23 September – Seoul
Australia	3
United Arab Emirates

9th place match
24 September – Seoul
Chinese Taipei	3
Australia
11th place match
24 September – Seoul
New Zealand
United Arab Emirates	3

=== Classification 5th–8th ===
5th–8th semifinals
23 September – Seoul
Kuwait	3
Iraq
23 September – Seoul
India	3
Iran

5th place match
24 September – Seoul
Kuwait	3
India	1
7th place match
24 September – Seoul
Iraq	3
Iran

==== 5th place match ====
Date		Score		Set 1	Set 2	Set 3	Set 4	Set 5	Total
24 Sep	Kuwait	3–1	India	15–11	10–15	15–11	15–4		55–42

=== Final four ===
Semifinals
23 September – Seoul
South Korea	3
Pakistan	0
23 September – Seoul
Japan	3
China	0

Final
24 September – Seoul
South Korea	3
Japan	0
3rd place match
24 September – Seoul
Pakistan	2
China	3

==== Semifinals ====
Date		Score		Set 1	Set 2	Set 3	Set 4	Set 5	Total
23 Sep	South Korea	3–0	Pakistan	15–4	15–1	15–9			45–14
23 Sep	Japan	3–0	China	15–11	15–10	15–2			45–23

=== 3rd place ===
Date		Score		Set 1	Set 2	Set 3	Set 4	Set 5	Total
24 Sep	China	3–2	Pakistan	13–15	15–11	15–10	13–15	15–10	71–61

==== Final ====
Date		Score		Set 1	Set 2	Set 3	Set 4	Set 5	Total
24 Sep	South Korea	3–0	Japan	15–6	15–9	15–13			45–28

== Final standing ==
Rank	Team
1st place, gold medalist(s)	South Korea
2nd place, silver medalist(s)	Japan
3rd place, bronze medalist(s)	China
4	Pakistan
5	Kuwait
6	India
7	Iraq
8	Iran
9	Chinese Taipei
10	Australia
11	United Arab Emirates
12	New Zealand
13	Sri Lanka
14	Hong Kong
15	Thailand
16	Bahrain
17	Bangladesh
18	Nepal
19	Qatar

Qualified for the 1989 Volleyball World Cup and 1990 Volleyball World Championship
Already qualified for the 1989 Volleyball World Cup and 1990 FIVB Volleyball Men's World B Championship as Hosts
Qualified for the 1990 FIVB Volleyball Men's World B Championship
Qualified for the 1990 FIVB Volleyball Men's World B Championship Qualifier (Kuwait and India later withdrew)

1989 Asian Men's champions

South Korea
1st title
