= 2005 Asian Men's Volleyball Championship =

International volleyball tournament

Tournament details
- Host country: Thailand
- City: Suphan Buri
- Dates: 20–27 September
- Teams: 18
- Venues: 2 (in 1 host city)

Final positions
- Champions: Japan (6th title)
- Runners-up: China
- Third place: South Korea
- Fourth place: India

Tournament awards
- MVP: (Japan) Marcos Sugiyama

The Asian Men's Volleyball Championship was the thirteenth staging of the Asian Men's Volleyball Championship, a biennial international volleyball tournament organised by the Asian Volleyball Confederation (AVC) with Thailand Volleyball Association (TVA). The tournament was held in Suphan Buri, Thailand from 20 to 27 September 2005.

== Venues ==
Suphanburi, Thailand
Silapa-Archa Gymnasium	Chaopha Gymnasium
Capacity: Unknown	Capacity: Unknown

== Pools composition ==
The teams are seeded based on their final ranking at the 2003 Asian Men's Volleyball Championship.

Pool A	Pool B	Pool C	Pool D
Thailand (Host)	South Korea (1st)	China (2nd)	Iran (3rd)
Pakistan (7th); New Zealand; Qatar	Japan (6th); United Arab Emirates; Indonesia; ~~Kazakhstan~~ *	India (5th); Bahrain; Vietnam * Chinese Taipei	Australia (4th); Philippines; Hong Kong; Uzbekistan

* Kazakhstan withdrew, Vietnam moved from Pool C to B.

== Preliminary round ==
=== Pool A ===
Pos	Team	Pld	W	L	Pts	SW	SL	SR	SPW	SPL	SPR	Qualification
1	Qatar	2	2	0	4	6	1	6.000	169	151	1.119	Pool E
2	Pakistan	2	1	1	3	4	3	1.333	167	157	1.064	Pool G
3	New Zealand	2	0	2	2	0	6	0.000	125	153	0.817	Pool G

Date	Time		Score		Set 1	Set 2	Set 3	Set 4	Set 5	Total
20 Sep	14:00	Pakistan	1–3	Qatar	16–25	23–25	25–17	25–27		89–94
21 Sep	14:00	New Zealand	0–3	Pakistan	24–26	25–27	14–25			63–78
22 Sep	14:00	Qatar	3–0	New Zealand	25–20	25–23	25–19			75–62

=== Pool B ===
Pos	Team	Pld	W	L	Pts	SW	SL	SR	SPW	SPL	SPR	Qualification
1	Japan	3	3	0	6	9	1	9.000	249	196	1.270	Pool F
2	Indonesia	3	2	1	5	7	6	1.167	294	274	1.073	Pool H
3	Vietnam	3	1	2	4	5	6	0.833	217	237	0.916	Pool H
4	United Arab Emirates	3	0	3	3	1	9	0.111	194	247	0.785	

Date	Time		Score		Set 1	Set 2	Set 3	Set 4	Set 5	Total
20 Sep	16:00	United Arab Emirates	1–3	Indonesia	19–25	20–25	25–22	18–25		82–97
20 Sep	18:00	Vietnam	0–3	Japan	14–25	14–25	21–25			49–75
21 Sep	16:00	Indonesia	1–3	Japan	23–25	26–24	18–25	19–25		86–99
21 Sep	18:00	United Arab Emirates	0–3	Vietnam	18–25	20–25	13–25			51–75
22 Sep	14:00	Vietnam	2–3	Indonesia	26–24	19–25	18–25	25–22	5–15	93–111
22 Sep	18:00	Japan	3–0	United Arab Emirates	25–16	25–23	25–22			75–61

=== Pool C ===
Pos	Team	Pld	W	L	Pts	SW	SL	SR	SPW	SPL	SPR	Qualification
1	India	2	2	0	4	6	0	MAX	151	125	1.208	Pool E
2	Bahrain	2	1	1	3	3	3	1.000	139	142	0.979	Pool G
3	Chinese Taipei	2	0	2	2	0	6	0.000	129	152	0.849	Pool G

Date	Time		Score		Set 1	Set 2	Set 3	Set 4	Set 5	Total
20 Sep	16:00	Chinese Taipei	0–3	Bahrain	24–26	21–25	22–25			67–76
21 Sep	16:00	India	3–0	Bahrain	25–19	25–22	25–22			75–63
22 Sep	16:00	Chinese Taipei	0–3	India	23–25	24–26	15–25			62–76

=== Pool D ===
Pos	Team	Pld	W	L	Pts	SW	SL	SR	SPW	SPL	SPR	Qualification
1	Australia	3	3	0	6	9	1	9.000	265	171	1.550	Pool F
2	Philippines	3	2	1	5	6	4	1.500	215	207	1.039	Pool H
3	Uzbekistan	3	1	2	4	4	8	0.500	252	287	0.878	Pool H
4	Hong Kong	3	0	3	3	3	9	0.333	218	285	0.765	

Date	Time		Score		Set 1	Set 2	Set 3	Set 4	Set 5	Total
20 Sep	12:00	Hong Kong	0–3	Australia	17–25	12–25	14–25			43–75
20 Sep	14:00	Philippines	3–0	Uzbekistan	25–16	25–21	25–17			75–54
21 Sep	12:00	Hong Kong	1–3	Philippines	19–25	19–25	26–24	14–25		78–99
21 Sep	14:00	Australia	3–1	Uzbekistan	25–13	40–42	25–16	25–16		115–87
22 Sep	12:00	Uzbekistan	3–2	Hong Kong	28–30	18–25	25–16	25–17	15–9	111–97
22 Sep	16:00	Philippines	0–3	Australia	12–25	16–25	13–25			41–75

== Quarterfinals ==
- The results and the points of the matches between the same teams that were already played during the preliminary round shall be taken into account for the Quarterfinals.

=== Pool E ===
Pos	Team	Pld	W	L	Pts	SW	SL	SR	SPW	SPL	SPR	Qualification
1	China	3	3	0	6	9	3	3.000	283	245	1.155	Semifinals
2	India	3	2	1	5	8	3	2.667	260	228	1.140	Semifinals
3	Thailand	3	1	2	4	4	6	0.667	218	234	0.932	5th–8th place
4	Qatar	3	0	3	3	0	9	0.000	171	225	0.760	5th–8th place

Date	Time		Score		Set 1	Set 2	Set 3	Set 4	Set 5	Total
23 Sep	14:00	Thailand	3–0	Qatar	25–22	25–21	25–21			75–64
23 Sep	16:00	China	3–2	India	25–21	22–25	24–26	26–24	16–14	113–110
24 Sep	14:00	China	3–0	Qatar	25–17	25–17	25–15			75–49
24 Sep	18:00	Thailand	0–3	India	22–25	14–25	21–25			57–75
25 Sep	12:00	Qatar	0–3	India	23–25	12–25	23–25			58–75
25 Sep	16:00	Thailand	1–3	China	25–20	22–25	19–25	20–25		86–95

=== Pool F ===
Pos	Team	Pld	W	L	Pts	SW	SL	SR	SPW	SPL	SPR	Qualification
1	Japan	3	2	1	5	8	5	1.600	301	270	1.115	Semifinals
2	South Korea	3	2	1	5	8	4	2.000	288	266	1.083	Semifinals
3	Iran	3	2	1	5	7	6	1.167	285	279	1.022	5th–8th place
4	Australia	3	0	3	3	1	9	0.111	186	245	0.759	5th–8th place

Date	Time		Score		Set 1	Set 2	Set 3	Set 4	Set 5	Total
23 Sep	12:00	Iran	3–1	Australia	20–25	25–16	25–20	25–14		95–75
23 Sep	18:00	South Korea	2–3	Japan	25–23	18–25	20–25	25–22	25–27	113–122
24 Sep	12:00	South Korea	3–0	Australia	25–23	25–19	25–15			75–57
24 Sep	16:00	Iran	3–2	Japan	25–21	25–18	18–25	18–25	17–15	103–104
25 Sep	14:00	South Korea	3–1	Iran	25–27	25–19	25–22	25–19		100–87
25 Sep	18:00	Japan	3–0	Australia	25–13	25–22	25–19			75–54

=== Pool G ===
Pos	Team	Pld	W	L	Pts	SW	SL	SR	SPW	SPL	SPR	Qualification
1	Pakistan	3	3	0	6	9	1	9.000	260	207	1.256	9th–12th place
2	Bahrain	3	2	1	5	6	4	1.500	235	225	1.044	9th–12th place
3	Chinese Taipei	3	1	2	4	4	7	0.571	245	265	0.925	13th–16th place
4	New Zealand	3	0	3	3	2	9	0.222	228	271	0.841	13th–16th place

Date	Time		Score		Set 1	Set 2	Set 3	Set 4	Set 5	Total
23 Sep	12:00	Bahrain	3–1	New Zealand	25–15	25–23	22–25	25–18		97–81
23 Sep	14:00	Pakistan	3–1	Chinese Taipei	25–18	25–13	30–32	25–19		105–82
24 Sep	12:00	New Zealand	1–3	Chinese Taipei	25–21	19–25	17–25	23–25		84–96
24 Sep	14:00	Pakistan	3–0	Bahrain	25–17	27–25	25–20			77–62

=== Pool H ===
Pos	Team	Pld	W	L	Pts	SW	SL	SR	SPW	SPL	SPR	Qualification
1	Indonesia	3	3	0	6	9	3	3.000	281	214	1.313	9th–12th place
2	Vietnam	3	2	1	5	8	3	2.667	243	221	1.100	9th–12th place
3	Philippines	3	1	2	4	4	6	0.667	208	224	0.929	13th–16th place
4	Uzbekistan	3	0	3	3	0	9	0.000	152	225	0.676	13th–16th place

Date	Time		Score		Set 1	Set 2	Set 3	Set 4	Set 5	Total
23 Sep	16:00	Indonesia	3–0	Uzbekistan	25–20	25–13	25–17			75–50
23 Sep	18:00	Philippines	0–3	Vietnam	20–25	20–25	22–25			62–75
24 Sep	16:00	Vietnam	3–0	Uzbekistan	25–16	25–17	25–15			75–48
24 Sep	18:00	Indonesia	3–1	Philippines	25–12	25–20	20–25	25–14		95–71

== Classification 17th–18th ==
Date	Time		Score		Set 1	Set 2	Set 3	Set 4	Set 5	Total
24 Sep	10:00	United Arab Emirates	3–2	Hong Kong	25–14	26–28	26–28	25–23	15–8	117–101

== Classification 13th–16th ==
13th–16th places
25 September – Suphanburi
Chinese Taipei	3
Uzbekistan	1
25 September – Suphanburi
Philippines	3
New Zealand	1

13th place
26 September – Suphanburi
Chinese Taipei	3
Philippines	2
15th place
26 September – Suphanburi
Uzbekistan	1
New Zealand	3

=== Semifinals ===
Date	Time		Score		Set 1	Set 2	Set 3	Set 4	Set 5	Total
25 Sep	12:00	Chinese Taipei	3–1	Uzbekistan	25–20	23–25	25–20	25–14		98–79
25 Sep	14:00	Philippines	3–1	New Zealand	16–25	25–23	25–18	26–24		92–90

=== 15th place ===
Date	Time		Score		Set 1	Set 2	Set 3	Set 4	Set 5	Total
26 Sep	12:00	Uzbekistan	1–3	New Zealand	25–27	30–28	22–25	20–25		97–105

=== 13th place ===
Date	Time		Score		Set 1	Set 2	Set 3	Set 4	Set 5	Total
26 Sep	14:00	Chinese Taipei	3–2	Philippines	25–20	23–25	25–17	25–27	16–14	114–103

== Classification 9th–12th ==
9th–12th places
25 September – Suphanburi
Pakistan	3
Vietnam	1
25 September – Suphanburi
Indonesia	0
Bahrain	3

9th place
26 September – Suphanburi
Pakistan	3
Bahrain	1
11th place
26 September – Suphanburi
Vietnam	2
Indonesia	3

=== Semifinals ===
Date	Time		Score		Set 1	Set 2	Set 3	Set 4	Set 5	Total
25 Sep	16:00	Pakistan	3–1	Vietnam	25–16	18–25	25–19	29–27		97–87
25 Sep	18:00	Indonesia	0–3	Bahrain	17–25	19–25	25–27			61–77

=== 11th place ===
Date	Time		Score		Set 1	Set 2	Set 3	Set 4	Set 5	Total
26 Sep	16:00	Vietnam	2–3	Indonesia	25–22	25–22	21–25	22–25	13–15	106–109

=== 9th place ===
Date	Time		Score		Set 1	Set 2	Set 3	Set 4	Set 5	Total
26 Sep	18:00	Pakistan	3–1	Bahrain	28–30	25–16	25–20	25–21		103–87

== Classification 5th–8th ==
5th–8th places
26 September – Suphanburi
Thailand	3
Australia	1
26 September – Suphanburi
Iran	3
Qatar	1

5th place
27 September – Suphanburi
Thailand	3
Iran	2
7th place
27 September – Suphanburi
Australia	0
Qatar	3

=== Semifinals ===
Date	Time		Score		Set 1	Set 2	Set 3	Set 4	Set 5	Total
26 Sep	12:00	Thailand	3–1	Australia	20–25	25–18	25–19	25–23		95–85
26 Sep	14:00	Iran	3–1	Qatar	25–12	25–23	23–25	25–17		98–77

=== 7th place ===
Date	Time		Score		Set 1	Set 2	Set 3	Set 4	Set 5	Total
27 Sep	11:00	Australia	0–3	Qatar	16–25	24–26	24–26			64–77

=== 5th place ===
Date	Time		Score		Set 1	Set 2	Set 3	Set 4	Set 5	Total
27 Sep	13:00	Thailand	3–2	Iran	25–22	14–25	27–29	25–23	15–12	106–111

== Final round ==
Semifinals
26 September – Suphanburi
China	3
South Korea	2
26 September – Suphanburi
Japan	3
India	0

Final
27 September – Suphanburi
China	0
Japan	3
3rd place
27 September – Suphanburi
South Korea	3
India	1

=== Semifinals ===
Date	Time		Score		Set 1	Set 2	Set 3	Set 4	Set 5	Total
26 Sep	16:00	China	3–2	South Korea	24–26	24–26	25–21	29–27	19–17	121–117
26 Sep	18:00	Japan	3–0	India	25–17	25–23	36–34			86–74

=== 3rd place ===
Date	Time		Score		Set 1	Set 2	Set 3	Set 4	Set 5	Total
27 Sep	16:00	South Korea	3–1	India	25–20	25–18	22–25	25–16		97–79

=== Final ===
Date	Time		Score		Set 1	Set 2	Set 3	Set 4	Set 5	Total
27 Sep	18:00	China	0–3	Japan	14–25	20–25	18–25			52–75

== Final standing ==
Rank	Team
1st place, gold medalist(s)	Japan
2nd place, silver medalist(s)	China
3rd place, bronze medalist(s)	South Korea
4	India
5	Thailand
6	Iran
7	Qatar
8	Australia
9	Pakistan
10	Bahrain
11	Indonesia
12	Vietnam
13	Chinese Taipei
14	Philippines
15	New Zealand
16	Uzbekistan
17	United Arab Emirates
18	Hong Kong

Qualified for the 2005 World Grand Champions Cup (by FIVB Wild Card)
Already qualified as hosts for the 2005 World Grand Champions Cup

2005 Asian Men's champions

Japan
6th title

Team Roster
Nobuharu Saito, Marcos Sugiyama, Kenji Onoue, Kazuma Kishimoto, Taiji Yamamoto, Masaji Ogino, Kota Yamamura, Kyohei Shibata, Katsutoshi Tsumagari, Takeshi Kitajima, Yu Koshikawa, Kosuke Tomonaga
Head Coach: Tatsuya Ueta

== Awards ==
- MVP: (Japan) Marcos Sugiyama
- Best scorer: (Japan) Yu Koshikawa
- Best spiker: (South Korea) Lee Sun-kyu
- Best blocker: (India) Yejju Subba Rao
- Best server: (South Korea) Lee Kyung-soo
- Best setter: (South Korea) Kwon Young-min
- Best libero: (South Korea) Yeo Oh-hyun
