= 1983 Asian Men's Volleyball Championship =

International volleyball tournament

Tournament details
- Host country: Japan
- City: Tokyo
- Dates: 23 November – 1 December
- Teams: 11
- Venue: 1 (in 1 host city)

Final positions
- Champions: Japan (2nd title)
- Runners-up: China
- Third place: South Korea
- Fourth place: Chinese Taipei

The 1983 Asian Men's Volleyball Championship was the third staging of the Asian Men's Volleyball Championship, a quadrennial international volleyball tournament organised by the Asian Volleyball Confederation (AVC) with Japan Volleyball Association (JVA). The tournament was held in Tokyo, Japan from 23 November to 1 December 1983.

== Preliminary round ==
Qualified for the 1st–4th places
Qualified for the 5th–8th places
Qualified for the 9th–11th places

=== Pool A ===
Pos	Team	Pld	W	L	Pts	SW	SL	SR	SPW	SPL	SPR	Qualification
1	Japan	4	4	0	8	12	0	MAX	180	56	3.214	Semifinals
2	Chinese Taipei	4	2	2	6	8	7	1.143	175	165	1.061	Semifinals
3	India	4	2	2	6	7	7	1.000	156	162	0.963	5th–8th place
4	Australia	4	2	2	6	7	9	0.778	167	205	0.815	5th–8th place
5	Indonesia	4	0	4	4	1	12	0.083	106	196	0.541	9th–11th place

- Philippines Withdrew

Date		Score		Set 1	Set 2	Set 3	Set 4	Set 5	Total
23 Nov	Japan	3–0	Australia	15–3	15–3	15–8			45–14
23 Nov	Chinese Taipei	3–0	Indonesia	15–7	15–5	15–5			45–17
24 Nov	Japan	3–0	Indonesia	15–3	15–6	15–2			45–11
24 Nov	India	3–1	Australia	10–15	15–7	15–9	15–2		55–33
25 Nov	Chinese Taipei	3–1	India	15–4	12–15	15–12	15–13		57–44
25 Nov	Australia	3–1	Indonesia	15–9	14–16	17–15	15–11		61–51
26 Nov	Australia	3–2	Chinese Taipei	10–15	15–8	4–15	15–10	15–6	59–54
26 Nov	Japan	3–0	India	15–8	15–4	15–0			45–12
27 Nov	India	3–0	Indonesia	15–12	15–6	15–9			45–27
27 Nov	Japan	3–0	Chinese Taipei	15–6	15–8	15–5			45–19

=== Pool B ===
Pos	Team	Pld	W	L	Pts	SW	SL	SR	SPW	SPL	SPR	Qualification
1	South Korea	5	5	0	10	15	1	15.000	232	81	2.864	Semifinals
2	China	5	4	1	9	13	3	4.333	231	76	3.039	Semifinals
3	New Zealand	5	3	2	8	9	9	1.000	172	0	MAX	5th–8th place
4	Kuwait	5	2	3	7	8	9	0.889	0	189	0.000	5th–8th place
5	Nepal	5	1	4	6	3	14	0.214	113	0	MAX	9th–11th place
6	Hong Kong	5	0	5	5	3	15	0.200	0	258	0.000	9th–11th place

Date		Score		Set 1	Set 2	Set 3	Set 4	Set 5	Total
23 Nov	China	3–0	Kuwait	15–2	15–2	15–6			45–10
23 Nov	South Korea	3–0	New Zealand	15–3	15–3	15–4			45–10
23 Nov	Nepal	3–2	Hong Kong	15–17	15–8	11–15	15–6	15–?	71–?
24 Nov	China	3–0	New Zealand	15–3	15–0	15–0			45–3
24 Nov	South Korea	3–0	Hong Kong	15–0	15–3	15–1			45–4
24 Nov	Kuwait	3–0	Nepal	15–2	15–10	15–1			45–13
25 Nov	China	3–0	Nepal	15–1	15–1	15–2			45–4
25 Nov	New Zealand	3–1	Hong Kong	15–3	7–15	15–7	15–3		52–28
25 Nov	South Korea	3–0	Kuwait	15–8	15–4	15–3			45–15
26 Nov	China	3–0	Hong Kong	15–1	15–4	15–2			45–7
26 Nov	South Korea	3–0	Nepal	15–1	15–0	15–0			45–1
26 Nov	New Zealand	3–2	Kuwait	15–12	4–15	17–15	13–15	15–10	64–67
27 Nov	New Zealand	3–0	Nepal	15–10	15–2	15–12			45–24
27 Nov	South Korea	3–1	China	15–13	15–9	6–15	16–14		52–51
27 Nov	Kuwait	3–0	Hong Kong	15–3	15–8	15–13			45–24

== Final round ==
=== Classification 9th–11th ===
Pos	Team	Pld	W	L	Pts	SW	SL	SR	SPW	SPL	SPR
9	Indonesia	2	2	0	4	6	0	MAX	0	0	—
10	Hong Kong	2	1	1	3	3	4	0.750	84	85	0.988
11	Nepal	2	0	2	2	1	6	0.167	0	0	—

Date		Score		Set 1	Set 2	Set 3	Set 4	Set 5	Total
29 Nov	Indonesia	3–0	Hong Kong	15–13	15–3	15–11			45–27
30 Nov	Hong Kong	3–1	Nepal	9–15	15–5	18–16	15–4		57–40
1 Dec	Indonesia	3–0	Nepal						

=== Classification 5th–8th ===
Pos	Team	Pld	W	L	Pts	SW	SL	SR	SPW	SPL	SPR
5	India	3	3	0	6	9	0	MAX	0	0	—
6	Australia	3	2	1	5	0	3	0.000	0	0	—
7	Kuwait	3	1	2	4	3	0	MAX	0	0	—
8	New Zealand	3	0	3	3	0	9	0.000	0	0	—

Date		Score		Set 1	Set 2	Set 3	Set 4	Set 5	Total
29 Nov	Australia	3–0	New Zealand	15–8	15–7	15–12			45–27
29 Nov	India	3–0	Kuwait	15–12	15–12	15–9			45–33
30 Nov	India	3–0	New Zealand	15–4	15–5	15–5			45–14
30 Nov	Australia	3–0	Kuwait	15–8	15–2	15–2			45–12
1 Des	India	3–?	Australia						
1 Dec	Kuwait	3–?	New Zealand						

=== Classification 1st–4th ===
Pos	Team	Pld	W	L	Pts	SW	SL	SR	SPW	SPL	SPR
1	Japan	3	3	0	6	9	4	2.250	178	125	1.424
2	China	3	2	1	5	8	5	1.600	153	150	1.020
3	South Korea	3	1	2	4	6	6	1.000	161	151	1.066
4	Chinese Taipei	3	0	3	3	1	9	0.111	78	142	0.549

Date		Score		Set 1	Set 2	Set 3	Set 4	Set 5	Total
29 Nov	China	3–1	Chinese Taipei	7–15	15–6	15–4	15–4		52–29
29 Nov	Japan	3–2	South Korea	12–15	15–9	15–13	8–15	15–11	65–63
30 Nov	China	3–1	South Korea	15–10	15–17	9–15	15–11		54–53
30 Nov	Japan	3–0	Chinese Taipei	15–8	15–7	15–7			45–22
01 Dec	South Korea	3–0	Chinese Taipei	15–12	15–12	15–10			45–32
01 Dec	China	2–3	Japan	15–12	15–11	7–15	3–15	7–15	47–68

== Final standing ==
Rank	Team
1st place, gold medalist(s)	Japan
2nd place, silver medalist(s)	China
3rd place, bronze medalist(s)	South Korea
4	Chinese Taipei
5	India
6	Australia
7	Kuwait
8	New Zealand
9	Indonesia
10	Hong Kong
11	Nepal

Qualified for the 1984 Summer Olympics
Qualified for the 1984 Olympic Qualifier
Invited for the 1984 Olympic Qualifier

1983 Asian Men's champions

Japan
2nd title
