= 2008 Asian Men's Volleyball Cup =

International indoor volleyball tournament

Tournament details
- Host country: Thailand
- City: Nakhon Ratchasima
- Dates: 20–26 September
- Teams: 8 (from 1 confederation)
- Venue: 1 (in 1 host city)

Final positions
- Champions: Iran (1st title)
- Runners-up: South Korea
- Third place: China
- Fourth place: Japan

Tournament awards
- MVP: (Iran) Hamzeh Zarini

The 2008 Asian Men's Volleyball Cup, so-called 2008 AVC Cup for Men was the inaugural edition of the Asian Cup, played by top eight teams of the 2007 Asian Championship. The tournament was held at MCC Hall Convention Center, Nakhon Ratchasima, Thailand from 20 to 26 September 2008.

== Pools composition ==
The teams are seeded based on their final ranking at the 2007 Asian Men's Volleyball Championship.

Pool A	Pool B
Thailand (Host); South Korea (3rd); China; Iran	Australia (1st); Japan (2nd); Chinese Taipei; Indonesia

== Venue ==
All matches
Nakhon Ratchasima, Thailand
MCC Hall Convention Center
Capacity: Unknown

== Preliminary round ==
=== Pool A ===
Pos	Team	Pld	W	L	Pts	SW	SL	SR	SPW	SPL	SPR	Qualification
1	South Korea	3	3	0	6	9	3	3.000	289	243	1.189	Quarterfinals
2	Iran	3	2	1	5	7	5	1.400	261	256	1.020	Quarterfinals
3	China	3	1	2	4	7	6	1.167	275	275	1.000	Quarterfinals
4	Thailand	3	0	3	3	0	9	0.000	174	225	0.773	Quarterfinals

Date	Time		Score		Set 1	Set 2	Set 3	Set 4	Set 5	Total
20 Sep	11:00	South Korea	3–1	Iran	23–25	25–17	25–17	25–22		98–81
20 Sep	16:00	China	3–0	Thailand	25–17	25–21	25–16			75–54
21 Sep	11:00	South Korea	3–2	China	25–16	23–25	23–25	30–28	15–13	116–107
21 Sep	16:00	Thailand	0–3	Iran	23–25	23–25	19–25			65–75
22 Sep	11:00	Iran	3–2	China	23–25	17–25	25–15	25–21	15–7	105–93
22 Sep	16:00	South Korea	3–0	Thailand	25–18	25–20	25–17			75–55

=== Pool B ===
Pos	Team	Pld	W	L	Pts	SW	SL	SR	SPW	SPL	SPR	Qualification
1	Japan	3	3	0	6	9	5	1.800	315	284	1.109	Quarterfinals
2	Australia	3	2	1	5	8	3	2.667	255	213	1.197	Quarterfinals
3	Chinese Taipei	3	1	2	4	5	6	0.833	216	252	0.857	Quarterfinals
4	Indonesia	3	0	3	3	1	9	0.111	218	255	0.855	Quarterfinals

Date	Time		Score		Set 1	Set 2	Set 3	Set 4	Set 5	Total
20 Sep	13:00	Chinese Taipei	0–3	Australia	12–25	18–25	14–25			44–75
20 Sep	18:00	Japan	3–1	Indonesia	24–26	25–20	25–19	25–23		99–88
21 Sep	13:00	Indonesia	0–3	Australia	24–26	16–25	25–27			65–78
21 Sep	18:00	Japan	3–2	Chinese Taipei	26–28	21–25	25–22	25–10	15–9	112–94
22 Sep	13:00	Chinese Taipei	3–0	Indonesia	28–26	25–23	25–16			78–65
22 Sep	18:00	Australia	2–3	Japan	20–25	25–16	25–23	19–25	13–15	102–104

== Final round ==
Quarterfinals
24 September
South Korea	3
Indonesia	0
24 September
Australia	0
China	3
24 September
Japan	3
Thailand	0
24 September
Iran	3
Chinese Taipei	0

Semifinals
25 September
South Korea	3
China	1
25 September
Japan	1
Iran	3

Final
26 September
South Korea	2
Iran	3
3rd place
26 September
China	3
Japan	0

5th–8th places
25 September
Indonesia	2
Australia	3
25 September
Thailand	3
Chinese Taipei	1

5th place
26 September
Australia	3
Thailand	0
7th place
26 September
Indonesia	1
Chinese Taipei	3

=== Quarterfinals ===
Date	Time		Score		Set 1	Set 2	Set 3	Set 4	Set 5	Total
24 Sep	11:00	South Korea	3–0	Indonesia	25–15	29–27	25–23			79–65
24 Sep	13:00	Australia	0–3	China	14–25	20–25	22–25			56–75
24 Sep	16:00	Iran	3–0	Chinese Taipei	25–11	25–16	25–19			75–46
24 Sep	18:00	Japan	3–0	Thailand	25–18	25–21	25–20			75–59

=== 5th–8th semifinals ===
Date	Time		Score		Set 1	Set 2	Set 3	Set 4	Set 5	Total
25 Sep	11:00	Indonesia	2–3	Australia	23–25	25–19	17–25	25–20	8–15	98–104
25 Sep	13:00	Thailand	3–1	Chinese Taipei	25–19	25–18	21–25	25–21		96–83

=== Semifinals ===
Date	Time		Score		Set 1	Set 2	Set 3	Set 4	Set 5	Total
25 Sep	16:00	South Korea	3–1	China	25–17	26–24	25–27	25–15		101–83
25 Sep	18:00	Japan	1–3	Iran	20–25	17–25	28–26	22–25		87–101

=== 7th place ===
Date	Time		Score		Set 1	Set 2	Set 3	Set 4	Set 5	Total
26 Sep	11:00	Indonesia	1–3	Chinese Taipei	21–25	23–25	25–21	27–29		96–100

=== 5th place ===
Date	Time		Score		Set 1	Set 2	Set 3	Set 4	Set 5	Total
26 Sep	13:00	Australia	3–0	Thailand	29–27	25–16	25–17			79–60

=== 3rd place ===
Date	Time		Score		Set 1	Set 2	Set 3	Set 4	Set 5	Total
26 Sep	16:00	China	3–0	Japan	25–22	25–16	25–19			75–57

=== Final ===
Date	Time		Score		Set 1	Set 2	Set 3	Set 4	Set 5	Total
26 Sep	18:00	South Korea	2–3	Iran	25–13	15–25	25–27	25–15	7–15	97–95

== Final standing ==
Rank	Team
1st place, gold medalist(s)	Iran
2nd place, silver medalist(s)	South Korea
3rd place, bronze medalist(s)	China
4	Japan
5	Australia
6	Thailand
7	Chinese Taipei
8	Indonesia

2008 Asian Men's Cup champions

Iran
1st title

Team Roster

Mojtaba Attar, Saeid Marouf, Javad Mohammadinejad, Arash Keshavarzi, Hamzeh Zarini, Mohammad Mohammadkazem, Alireza Nadi, Ahsanollah Shirkavand, Mansour Zadvan, Farhad Nazari Afshar, Mehdi Mahdavi, Mohammad Mousavi

Head Coach: Hossein Maadani

== Awards ==
- MVP: (Iran) Hamzeh Zarini
- Best scorer: (Japan) Yasuyuki Shibakoya
- Best spiker: (South Korea) Park Chul-woo
- Best server: (China) Cui Jianjun
- Best setter: (Thailand) Saranchit Charoensuk
- Best receiver: (South Korea) Yeo Oh-hyun
- Best digger: (Chinese Taipei) Chien Wei-lun
- Best libero: (South Korea) Yeo Oh-hyun
