= Yeo Oh-hyun =

South Korean volleyball player

Personal information
- Nationality: South Korean
- Born: 2 September 1978 (age 48) Incheon
- Education: Hongik University
- Height: 1.75 m (5 ft 9 in)
- Weight: 70 kg (154 lb)
- Spike: 280 cm (110 in)
- Block: 279 cm (110 in)

Volleyball information
- Position: Libero
- Current club: Hyundai Capital Skywalkers
- Number: 5

Career
- Years: Team
- 2000–2013 2013–: Samsung Fire Bluefangs; Hyundai Capital Skywalkers

National team
- Years: Team
- 2001–2012: South Korea
Honours
Asian Games
Gold medal – first place	2002 Busan
Gold medal – first place	2006 Doha
Bronze medal – third place	2010 Guangzhou
Asian Championship
Gold medal – first place	2001 Changwon
Gold medal – first place	2003 Tianjin
Bronze medal – third place	2005 Suphan Buri
Bronze medal – third place	2007 Jakarta
Bronze medal – third place	2009 Manila
Bronze medal – third place	2011 Tehran
AVC Cup
Silver medal – second place	2008 Nakhon Ratchasima
- Updated on 27 December 2017

Yeo Oh-hyun (Korean: 여오현; born 2 September 1978) is a South Korean male volleyball player. He currently plays the libero position for the Cheonan Hyundai Capital Skywalkers.

== Career ==
=== Clubs ===
Yeo, a 5-foot-9 (1.75 m) libero, played outside hitter for Hongik University for two years before converting to libero in the 1998–99 collegiate season. In the 2000 Super League semi-pro draft, Yeo was selected seventh overall by Samsung Fire Volleyball Club.

As the starting libero, Yeo helped the Samsung Fire Bluefangs win the national championship 11 times in the semi-pro Super League (2001−2004) and pro V-League (2005, 2008−2013).

After the 2012–13 V-League season, Yeo signed a contract with the Cheonan Hyundai Capital Skywalkers as a free agent. In the 2016–17 season, Yeo won his eighth V-League championship, leading the Skywalkers to their third V-League title.

=== National team ===
In June 2001 Yeo was first selected for the South Korean senior national team to compete at the 2001 Asian Championship, where South Korea won the gold medal and he was named Best Receiver of the tournament.

Yeo took part as the starting libero for the South Korean national team at the 2003 Asian Championship, where the team won the back-to-back gold medal and he earned Best Digger honors.

At the 2008 AVC Cup, Yeo was named Best Receiver and Best Libero of the tournament. South Korea lost to Iran in the gold medal game.

He was also a member of the national team at the 2003 FIVB World Cup, 2006 FIVB World Championship and 2007 FIVB World Cup.

Yeo retired from the national team after the 2012 Olympic Qualification Tournament.

== Individual awards ==
=== Club ===
- 2015 V-League - Best Libero
- 2016 V-League - Best Libero

=== National team ===
- 2001 Asian Championship - Best Receiver
- 2003 Asian Championship - Best Digger
- 2005 Asian Championship - Best Libero
- 2007 Asian Championship - Best Libero
- 2008 AVC Cup - Best Libero, Best Receiver
- 2009 Asian Championship - Best Libero, Best Digger
