= Yejju Subba Rao =

Indian volleyball player (born 1981)

Subba
Personal information
- Full name: Yejju Subba Rao
- Born: 3 August 1981 (age 45) Nellore, Andhra Pradesh
- Height: 2.08 m (6 ft 10 in)
- Weight: 90 kg (200 lb)
- Spike: 355 cm (140 in)
- Block: 330 cm (130 in)

Volleyball information

Career
- Years: Team
- –: ONGC

National team
- Years: Team
- –: India

Yejju Subba Rao (born 3 August 1981) is an Indian international volleyball player. Subba Rao was awarded best player on numerous occasions by the national federation and local government.

== Awards ==
- 2003 Asian Championship "Most Valuable Player"
- 2003 Asian Championship "Best Spiker"
- 2003 Asian Championship "Best Blocker"
- 2005 Asian Championship "Best Blocker"
