= 2001 Asian Men's Volleyball Championship =

International volleyball tournament

Tournament details
- Host country: South Korea
- City: Changwon
- Dates: 9–16 September
- Teams: 12
- Venue: 1 (in 1 host city)

Final positions
- Champions: South Korea (3rd title)
- Runners-up: Australia
- Third place: Japan
- Fourth place: China

Tournament awards
- MVP: (South Korea) Shin Jin-sik

The Asian Men's Volleyball Championship was the eleventh staging of the Asian Men's Volleyball Championship, a biennial international volleyball tournament organised by the Asian Volleyball Confederation (AVC) with Korea Volleyball Association (KVA). The tournament was held in Changwon, South Korea from 8 to 16 September 2001.

== Venue ==
Changwon, South Korea
Changwon Indoor Gymnasium
Capacity: 6,000
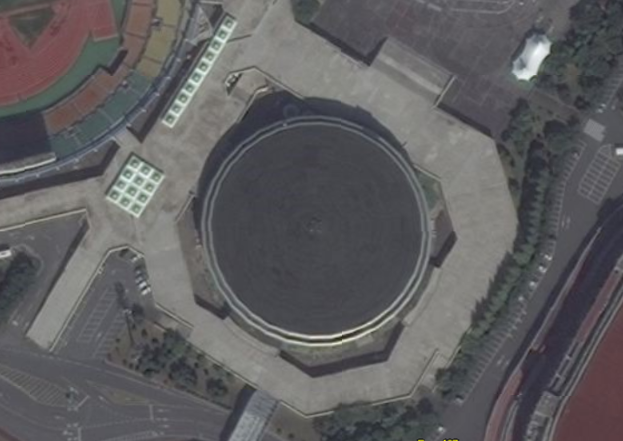

== Pools composition ==
The teams are seeded based on their final ranking at the 1999 Asian Men's Volleyball Championship.

Pool A	Pool B	Pool C	Pool D
South Korea (Host & 3rd); Kazakhstan (11th); Saudi Arabia	China (1st); India (9th); Qatar	Australia (2nd); Chinese Taipei (7th); United Arab Emirates	Japan (4th); Iran (5th); Hong Kong; ~~Uzbekistan~~ *

* Withdrew

== Preliminary round ==
=== Pool A ===
Pos	Team	Pld	W	L	Pts	SW	SL	SR	SPW	SPL	SPR	Qualification
1	South Korea	2	2	0	4	6	0	MAX	151	93	1.624	Pool E
2	Saudi Arabia	2	1	1	3	3	5	0.600	151	179	0.844	Pool E
3	Kazakhstan	2	0	2	2	2	6	0.333	154	184	0.837	

Date	Time		Score		Set 1	Set 2	Set 3	Set 4	Set 5	Total
09 Sep	14:30	Kazakhstan	0–3	South Korea	15–25	11–25	24–26			50–76
10 Sep	15:30	Saudi Arabia	3–2	Kazakhstan	25–21	25–19	23–25	19–25	16–14	108–104
11 Sep	13:30	South Korea	3–0	Saudi Arabia	25–17	25–14	25–12			75–43

=== Pool B ===
Pos	Team	Pld	W	L	Pts	SW	SL	SR	SPW	SPL	SPR	Qualification
1	China	2	2	0	4	6	2	3.000	183	146	1.253	Pool F
2	India	2	1	1	3	5	4	1.250	199	189	1.053	Pool F
3	Qatar	2	0	2	2	1	6	0.167	126	173	0.728	

Date	Time		Score		Set 1	Set 2	Set 3	Set 4	Set 5	Total
09 Sep	11:30	China	3–2	India	22–25	25–19	25–20	21–25	15–12	108–101
10 Sep	11:30	Qatar	0–3	China	17–25	12–25	16–25			45–75
11 Sep	11:30	India	3–1	Qatar	25–20	25–15	23–25	25–21		98–81

=== Pool C ===
Pos	Team	Pld	W	L	Pts	SW	SL	SR	SPW	SPL	SPR	Qualification
1	Australia	2	2	0	4	6	0	MAX	150	118	1.271	Pool E
2	Chinese Taipei	2	1	1	3	3	3	1.000	137	132	1.038	Pool E
3	United Arab Emirates	2	0	2	2	0	6	0.000	113	150	0.753	

Date	Time		Score		Set 1	Set 2	Set 3	Set 4	Set 5	Total
09 Sep	16:30	Australia	3–0	United Arab Emirates	25–17	25–17	25–22			75–56
10 Sep	13:30	Chinese Taipei	0–3	Australia	18–25	22–25	22–25			62–75
11 Sep	15:30	United Arab Emirates	0–3	Chinese Taipei	18–25	22–25	17–25			57–75

=== Pool D ===
Pos	Team	Pld	W	L	Pts	SW	SL	SR	SPW	SPL	SPR	Qualification
1	Japan	2	2	0	4	6	2	3.000	188	140	1.343	Pool F
2	Iran	2	1	1	3	5	3	1.667	179	150	1.193	Pool F
3	Hong Kong	2	0	2	2	0	6	0.000	73	150	0.487	

Date	Time		Score		Set 1	Set 2	Set 3	Set 4	Set 5	Total
09 Sep	18:30	Hong Kong	0–3	Iran	14–25	10–25	13–25			37–75
10 Sep	17:30	Japan	3–0	Hong Kong	25–15	25–6	25–15			75–36
11 Sep	17:30	Iran	2–3	Japan	25–23	27–25	20–25	20–25	12–15	104–113

== Quarterfinals ==
- The results and the points of the matches between the same teams that were already played during the preliminary round shall be taken into account for the Quarterfinals.

=== Pool E ===
Pos	Team	Pld	W	L	Pts	SW	SL	SR	SPW	SPL	SPR	Qualification
1	South Korea	3	3	0	6	9	1	9.000	248	185	1.341	Semifinals
2	Australia	3	2	1	5	7	3	2.333	235	212	1.108	Semifinals
3	Chinese Taipei	3	1	2	4	3	7	0.429	218	242	0.901	5th–8th place
4	Saudi Arabia	3	0	3	3	1	9	0.111	187	249	0.751	5th–8th place

Date	Time		Score		Set 1	Set 2	Set 3	Set 4	Set 5	Total
12 Sep	13:30	South Korea	3–0	Chinese Taipei	25–19	25–16	25–22			75–57
12 Sep	15:30	Australia	3–0	Saudi Arabia	25–15	25–22	25–15			75–52
13 Sep	13:30	South Korea	3–1	Australia	23–25	25–23	25–18	25–19		98–85
13 Sep	15:30	Saudi Arabia	1–3	Chinese Taipei	25–21	22–25	19–25	26–28		92–99

=== Pool F ===
Pos	Team	Pld	W	L	Pts	SW	SL	SR	SPW	SPL	SPR	Qualification
1	Japan	3	3	0	6	9	2	4.500	264	229	1.153	Semifinals
2	China	3	2	1	5	6	5	1.200	244	237	1.030	Semifinals
3	Iran	3	1	2	4	5	8	0.625	274	282	0.972	5th–8th place
4	India	3	0	3	3	4	9	0.444	259	293	0.884	5th–8th place

Date	Time		Score		Set 1	Set 2	Set 3	Set 4	Set 5	Total
12 Sep	17:30	China	3–0	Iran	25–22	25–16	25–23			75–61
12 Sep	19:30	Japan	3–0	India	25–22	25–18	26–24			76–64
13 Sep	17:30	China	0–3	Japan	17–25	22–25	22–25			61–75
13 Sep	19:30	India	2–3	Iran	18–25	13–25	25–23	25–21	13–15	94–109

=== Pool G ===
Pos	Team	Pld	W	L	Pts	SW	SL	SR	SPW	SPL	SPR	Qualification
1	Kazakhstan	1	1	0	2	3	0	MAX	78	66	1.182	9th–12th places
2	United Arab Emirates	1	0	1	1	0	3	0.000	66	78	0.846	9th–12th places

Date	Time		Score		Set 1	Set 2	Set 3	Set 4	Set 5	Total
12 Sep	11:30	Kazakhstan	3–0	United Arab Emirates	25–18	25–22	28–26			78–66

=== Pool H ===
Pos	Team	Pld	W	L	Pts	SW	SL	SR	SPW	SPL	SPR	Qualification
1	Qatar	1	1	0	2	3	0	MAX	75	52	1.442	9th–12th places
2	Hong Kong	1	0	1	1	0	3	0.000	52	75	0.693	9th–12th places

Date	Time		Score		Set 1	Set 2	Set 3	Set 4	Set 5	Total
13 Sep	11:30	Qatar	3–0	Hong Kong	25–17	25–20	25–15			75–52

== Classification 9th–12th ==
9th–12th places
14 September – Changwon
Kazakhstan	3
Hong Kong	0
14 September – Changwon
Qatar	2
United Arab Emirates	3

9th place
15 September – Changwon
Kazakhstan	3
United Arab Emirates	0
11th place
15 September – Changwon
Hong Kong	0
Qatar	3

=== Semifinals ===
Date	Time		Score		Set 1	Set 2	Set 3	Set 4	Set 5	Total
14 Sep	14:00	Kazakhstan	3–0	Hong Kong	25–12	25–11	25–14			75–37
14 Sep	16:00	Qatar	2–3	United Arab Emirates	27–29	25–22	25–20	21–25	12–15	110–111

=== 11th place ===
Date	Time		Score		Set 1	Set 2	Set 3	Set 4	Set 5	Total
15 Sep	10:00	Hong Kong	0–3	Qatar	13–25	11–25	19–25			43–75

=== 9th place ===
Date	Time		Score		Set 1	Set 2	Set 3	Set 4	Set 5	Total
15 Sep	12:00	Kazakhstan	3–0	United Arab Emirates	25–19	25–22	25–13			75–54

== Classification 5th–8th ==
5th–8th places
15 September – Changwon
Chinese Taipei	3
India	0
15 September – Changwon
Saudi Arabia	1
Iran	3

5th place
16 September – Changwon
Chinese Taipei	1
Iran	3
7th place
16 September – Changwon
India	3
Saudi Arabia	2

=== Semifinals ===
Date	Time		Score		Set 1	Set 2	Set 3	Set 4	Set 5	Total
15 Sep	18:00	Chinese Taipei	3–0	India	25–20	26–24	25–20			76–64
15 Sep	20:00	Saudi Arabia	1–3	Iran	27–25	25–27	11–25	16–25		79–102

=== 7th place ===
Date	Time		Score		Set 1	Set 2	Set 3	Set 4	Set 5	Total
16 Sep	14:00	India	3–2	Saudi Arabia	30–32	25–22	25–16	22–25	16–14	118–109

=== 5th place ===
Date	Time		Score		Set 1	Set 2	Set 3	Set 4	Set 5	Total
16 Sep	16:00	Chinese Taipei	1–3	Iran	14–25	20–25	28–26	23–25		85–101

== Final round ==
Semifinals
15 September – Changwon
South Korea	3
China	0
15 September – Changwon
Australia	3
Japan	0

Final
16 September – Changwon
South Korea	3
Australia	1
3rd place
16 September – Changwon
China	1
Japan	3

=== Semifinals ===
Date	Time		Score		Set 1	Set 2	Set 3	Set 4	Set 5	Total
15 Sep	14:00	South Korea	3–0	China	25–22	25–16	25–22			75–60
15 Sep	16:00	Australia	3–0	Japan	25–23	25–20	25–17			75–60

=== 3rd place ===
Date	Time		Score		Set 1	Set 2	Set 3	Set 4	Set 5	Total
16 Sep	18:00	China	1–3	Japan	17–25	22–25	25–23	19–25		83–98

=== Final ===
Date	Time		Score		Set 1	Set 2	Set 3	Set 4	Set 5	Total
16 Sep	20:00	South Korea	3–1	Australia	25–18	25–23	21–25	25–17		96–83

== Final standing ==
Rank	Team
1st place, gold medalist(s)	South Korea
2nd place, silver medalist(s)	Australia
3rd place, bronze medalist(s)	Japan
4	China
5	Iran
6	Chinese Taipei
7	India
8	Saudi Arabia
9	Kazakhstan
10	United Arab Emirates
11	Qatar
12	Hong Kong

Qualified for the 2001 World Grand Champions Cup
Already qualified as hosts for the 2001 World Grand Champions Cup

2001 Asian Men's champions

South Korea
3rd title

== Awards ==
- MVP: (South Korea) Shin Jin-sik
- Best scorer: (Australia) Benjamin Hardy
- Best spiker: (South Korea) Lee Kyung-soo
- Best blocker: (Australia) Dan Howard
- Best server: (South Korea) Shin Jin-sik
- Best setter: (South Korea) Choi Tae-woong
- Best digger: (Japan) Kenji Yamamoto
- Best receiver: (South Korea) Yeo Oh-hyun
