= 1997 Asian Men's Volleyball Championship =

International volleyball tournament

Tournament details
- Host country: Qatar
- City: Doha
- Dates: 3–11 September
- Teams: 17
- Venues: 2 (in 1 host city)

Final positions
- Champions: China (2nd title)
- Runners-up: Japan
- Third place: Australia
- Fourth place: Chinese Taipei

The Asian Men's Volleyball Championship was the ninth staging of the Asian Men's Volleyball Championship, a biennial international volleyball tournament organised by the Asian Volleyball Confederation (AVC) with Qatar Volleyball Association (QVA). The tournament was held in Doha, Qatar from 3 to 11 September 1997.

== Pools composition ==
The teams are seeded based on their final ranking at the 1995 Asian Men's Volleyball Championship.

Pool A	Pool B	Pool C	Pool D
Japan (1st)	China (2nd)	Iran (4th)	South Korea (3rd)
Qatar (Host); Saudi Arabia; Sri Lanka	Australia (5th); Uzbekistan; Philippines	Chinese Taipei (6th); Bahrain; Macau	Thailand (7th); Pakistan; India; United Arab Emirates

== Preliminary round ==
=== Pool A ===
Pos	Team	Pld	W	L	Pts	SW	SL	SR	SPW	SPL	SPR	Qualification
1	Qatar	2	2	0	4	0	0	—	0	0	—	Pool E or Pool F
2	Saudi Arabia	2	1	1	3	0	0	—	0	0	—	Pool G or Pool H
3	Sri Lanka	2	0	2	2	0	0	—	0	0	—	Pool G or Pool H

=== Pool B ===
Pos	Team	Pld	W	L	Pts	SW	SL	SR	SPW	SPL	SPR	Qualification
1	Australia	2	2	0	4	6	0	MAX	90	43	2.093	Pool E or Pool F
2	Philippines	2	1	1	3	0	0	—	0	0	—	Pool G or Pool H
3	Uzbekistan	2	0	2	2	0	0	—	0	0	—	Pool G or Pool H

Date		Score		Set 1	Set 2	Set 3	Set 4	Set 5	Total
03 Sep	Australia	3–0	Uzbekistan	15–7	15–3	15–8			45–18
04 Sep	Philippines	0–3	Australia	12–15	5–15	8–15			25–45
05 Sep	Uzbekistan	?–3	Philippines						

=== Pool C ===
Pos	Team	Pld	W	L	Pts	SW	SL	SR	SPW	SPL	SPR	Qualification
1	Chinese Taipei	2	2	0	4	0	0	—	0	0	—	Pool E or Pool F
2	Bahrain	2	1	1	3	0	0	—	0	0	—	Pool G or Pool H
3	Macau	2	0	2	2	0	0	—	0	0	—	Pool G or Pool H

=== Pool D ===
Pos	Team	Pld	W	L	Pts	SW	SL	SR	SPW	SPL	SPR	Qualification
1	Pakistan	3	2	1	5	0	0	—	0	0	—	Pool E or Pool F
2	India	3	2	1	5	0	0	—	0	0	—	Pool G or Pool H
3	Thailand	3	2	1	5	0	0	—	0	0	—	Pool G or Pool H
4	United Arab Emirates	3	0	3	3	0	0	—	0	0	—	17th place

Date		Score		Set 1	Set 2	Set 3	Set 4	Set 5	Total
03 Sep	Pakistan	3–0	United Arab Emirates	16–14	15–12	15–8			46–34
03 Sep	India	2–3	Thailand	7–15	15–2	15–1	10–15	12–15	59–48
04 Sep	Thailand	0–3	Pakistan	11–15	9–15	8–15			28–45
04 Sep	United Arab Emirates	?–3	India						
05 Sep	Thailand	3–?	United Arab Emirates						
05 Sep	India	3–?	Pakistan						

== Quarterfinals ==
- The results and the points of the matches between the same teams that were already played during the preliminary round shall be taken into account for the Quarterfinals.

=== Pool E ===
Pos	Team	Pld	W	L	Pts	SW	SL	SR	SPW	SPL	SPR	Qualification
1	Japan	3	3	0	6	9	1	9.000	0	0	—	Championship round
2	Chinese Taipei	3	2	1	5	0	0	—	0	0	—	Championship round
3	Iran	3	1	2	4	5	7	0.714	0	0	—	5th–8th classification
4	Qatar	3	0	3	3	0	0	—	0	0	—	5th–8th classification

Date		Score		Set 1	Set 2	Set 3	Set 4	Set 5	Total
06 Sep	Japan	3–1	Chinese Taipei						
06 Sep	Iran	3–1	Qatar	?–15	15–11	15–13	15–?		
07 Sep	Japan	3–0	Iran	15–5	15–5	15–10			45–20
07 Sep	Qatar	?–3	Chinese Taipei						
08 Sep	Iran	2–3	Chinese Taipei	15–11	10–15	15–9	9–15	9–15	58–65
08 Sep	Japan	3–0	Qatar						

=== Pool F ===
Pos	Team	Pld	W	L	Pts	SW	SL	SR	SPW	SPL	SPR	Qualification
1	China	3	3	0	6	9	0	MAX	0	0	—	Championship round
2	Australia	3	2	1	5	6	3	2.000	121	99	1.222	Championship round
3	South Korea	3	1	2	4	3	6	0.500	93	113	0.823	5th–8th classification
4	Pakistan	3	0	3	3	0	9	0.000	0	0	—	5th–8th classification

Date		Score		Set 1	Set 2	Set 3	Set 4	Set 5	Total
06 Sep	China	3–0	Pakistan						
06 Sep	South Korea	0–3	Australia	14–16	13–15	6–15			33–46
07 Sep	Pakistan	0–3	Australia	7–15	1–15	12–15			20–45
07 Sep	China	3–0	South Korea	15–4	15–6	15–5			45–15
08 Sep	South Korea	3–0	Pakistan	15–9	15–4	15–9			45–22
08 Sep	China	3–0	Australia	15–9	15–7	16–14			46–30

=== Pool G ===
Pos	Team	Pld	W	L	Pts	SW	SL	SR	SPW	SPL	SPR	Qualification
1	Bahrain	3	3	0	6	0	0	—	0	0	—	9th–12th classification
2	Saudi Arabia	3	2	1	5	0	0	—	0	0	—	9th–12th classification
3	Macau	3	1	2	4	0	0	—	0	0	—	13th–16th classification
4	Sri Lanka	3	0	3	3	0	0	—	0	0	—	13th–16th classification

=== Pool H ===
Pos	Team	Pld	W	L	Pts	SW	SL	SR	SPW	SPL	SPR	Qualification
1	Thailand	3	3	0	6	0	0	—	0	0	—	9th–12th classification
2	India	3	2	1	5	0	0	—	0	0	—	9th–12th classification
3	Philippines	3	1	2	4	0	0	—	0	0	—	13th–16th classification
4	Uzbekistan	3	0	3	3	0	0	—	0	0	—	13th–16th classification

== Final round ==
- The results and the points of the matches between the same teams that were already played during the previous rounds shall be taken into account for the final round.

=== Classification 9th–12th ===
Pos	Team	Pld	W	L	Pts	SW	SL	SR	SPW	SPL	SPR

Date		Score		Set 1	Set 2	Set 3	Set 4	Set 5	Total
	Saudi Arabia	1–3	Thailand						
	Bahrain	?–3	India						
	Saudi Arabia	?–3	India						
	Bahrain	3–1	Thailand						

=== Classification 5th–8th ===
Pos	Team	Pld	W	L	Pts	SW	SL	SR	SPW	SPL	SPR

Date		Score		Set 1	Set 2	Set 3	Set 4	Set 5	Total
10 Sep	Iran	3–1	Pakistan	15–13	16–17	15–2	15–7		61–39
10 Sep	Qatar	1–3	South Korea	5–15	16–14	6–15	13–15		40–59
11 Sep	Iran	0–3	South Korea	7–15	1–15	5–15			13–45
11 Sep	Qatar	?–3	Pakistan						

=== Championship ===
Pos	Team	Pld	W	L	Pts	SW	SL	SR	SPW	SPL	SPR
1	China	3	3	0	6	9	1	9.000	0	0	—
2	Japan	3	2	1	5	7	4	1.750	0	0	—
3	Australia	3	1	2	4	3	6	0.500	95	121	0.785
4	Chinese Taipei	3	0	3	3	1	9	0.111	0	0	—

Date		Score		Set 1	Set 2	Set 3	Set 4	Set 5	Total
10 Sep	Japan	3–0	Australia	15–3	15–8	15–8			45–19
10 Sep	Chinese Taipei	0–3	China						
11 Sep	Chinese Taipei	0–3	Australia	9–15	7–15	14–16			30–46
11 Sep	Japan	1–3	China	12–15	15–8	7–15	10–15		44–53

== Final standing ==
Rank	Team
1st place, gold medalist(s)	China
2nd place, silver medalist(s)	Japan
3rd place, bronze medalist(s)	Australia
4	Chinese Taipei
5	South Korea
6	Iran
7	Pakistan
8	Qatar
9	India
10	Bahrain
11	Thailand
12	Saudi Arabia
13	Macau
14	Philippines
15	Sri Lanka
16	Uzbekistan
17	United Arab Emirates

Qualified for the 1997 World Grand Champions Cup
Already qualified as hosts for the 1997 World Grand Champions Cup

1997 Asian Men's champions

China
2nd title
