= 1999 Asian Men's Volleyball Championship =

International volleyball tournament

Tournament details
- Host country: Iran
- City: Tehran
- Dates: 2–9 September
- Teams: 14
- Venues: 2 (in 1 host city)

Final positions
- Champions: China (3rd title)
- Runners-up: Australia
- Third place: South Korea
- Fourth place: Japan

Tournament awards
- MVP: (Iran) Behnam Mahmoudi

The Asian Men's Volleyball Championship was the tenth staging of the Asian Men's Volleyball Championship, a biennial international volleyball tournament organised by the Asian Volleyball Confederation (AVC) with Islamic Republic of Iran Volleyball Federation (IRIVF). The tournament was held in Tehran, Iran from 2 to 9 September 1999.

== Venues ==
Tehran, Iran
Azadi Indoor Stadium	Azadi Volleyball Hall
Capacity: 12,000	Capacity: 3,000

== Pools composition ==
The teams are seeded based on their final ranking at the 1997 Asian Men's Volleyball Championship.

Pool A	Pool B	Pool C	Pool D
Iran (Host & 6th); Qatar (8th); Indonesia	China (1st); Pakistan (7th); Kazakhstan	Japan (2nd); South Korea (5th); India; Bahrain	Australia (3rd); Chinese Taipei (4th); Kuwait; Sri Lanka

== Preliminary round ==
=== Pool A ===
Pos	Team	Pld	W	L	Pts	SW	SL	SR	SPW	SPL	SPR	Qualification
1	Iran	2	2	0	4	6	1	6.000	172	135	1.274	Pool E
2	Indonesia	2	1	1	3	4	3	1.333	160	163	0.982	Pool E
3	Qatar	2	0	2	2	0	6	0.000	116	150	0.773	

Date	Time		Score		Set 1	Set 2	Set 3	Set 4	Set 5	Total
02 Sep	18:00	Iran	3–0	Qatar	25–20	25–13	25–17			75–50
03 Sep	17:00	Indonesia	1–3	Iran	19–25	25–22	22–25	19–25		85–97
04 Sep	15:00	Qatar	0–3	Indonesia	23–25	23–25	20–25			66–75

=== Pool B ===
Pos	Team	Pld	W	L	Pts	SW	SL	SR	SPW	SPL	SPR	Qualification
1	China	2	2	0	4	6	0	MAX	150	120	1.250	Pool F
2	Pakistan	2	1	1	3	3	3	1.000	134	127	1.055	Pool F
3	Kazakhstan	2	0	2	2	0	6	0.000	113	150	0.753	

Date	Time		Score		Set 1	Set 2	Set 3	Set 4	Set 5	Total
02 Sep	14:00	China	3–0	Kazakhstan	25–20	25–19	25–22			75–61
03 Sep	19:00	Pakistan	0–3	China	16–25	23–25	20–25			59–75
04 Sep	17:00	Kazakhstan	0–3	Pakistan	20–25	15–25	17–25			52–75

=== Pool C ===
Pos	Team	Pld	W	L	Pts	SW	SL	SR	SPW	SPL	SPR	Qualification
1	Japan	3	3	0	6	9	2	4.500	259	217	1.194	Pool E
2	South Korea	3	2	1	5	8	3	2.667	254	220	1.155	Pool E
3	India	3	1	2	4	3	7	0.429	209	239	0.874	
4	Bahrain	3	0	3	3	1	9	0.111	203	249	0.815	

Date	Time		Score		Set 1	Set 2	Set 3	Set 4	Set 5	Total
02 Sep	18:00	Bahrain	1–3	India	21–25	25–23	24–26	19–25		89–99
02 Sep	20:00	South Korea	2–3	Japan	18–25	24–26	25–20	25–23	12–15	104–109
03 Sep	15:00	South Korea	3–0	Bahrain	25–20	25–19	25–20			75–59
03 Sep	15:30	Japan	3–0	India	25–18	25–21	25–19			75–58
04 Sep	17:30	India	0–3	South Korea	19–25	16–25	17–25			52–75
04 Sep	19:30	Bahrain	0–3	Japan	18–25	14–25	23–25			55–75

=== Pool D ===
Pos	Team	Pld	W	L	Pts	SW	SL	SR	SPW	SPL	SPR	Qualification
1	Australia	3	3	0	6	9	1	9.000	251	179	1.402	Pool F
2	Chinese Taipei	3	2	1	5	6	4	1.500	223	222	1.005	Pool F
3	Sri Lanka	3	1	2	4	5	7	0.714	269	296	0.909	
4	Kuwait	3	0	3	3	1	9	0.111	208	254	0.819	

Date	Time		Score		Set 1	Set 2	Set 3	Set 4	Set 5	Total
02 Sep	14:00	Kuwait	1–3	Sri Lanka	25–23	22–25	22–25	28–30		97–103
02 Sep	20:00	Australia	3–0	Chinese Taipei	25–21	25–12	25–16			75–49
03 Sep	17:30	Chinese Taipei	3–1	Sri Lanka	23–25	25–18	25–18	25–20		98–81
03 Sep	19:30	Australia	3–0	Kuwait	25–12	25–15	25–18			75–45
04 Sep	15:30	Sri Lanka	1–3	Australia	15–25	19–25	28–26	23–25		85–101
04 Sep	19:00	Kuwait	0–3	Chinese Taipei	24–26	21–25	21–25			66–76

== Quarterfinals ==
- The results and the points of the matches between the same teams that were already played during the preliminary round shall be taken into account for the Quarterfinals.

=== Pool E ===
Pos	Team	Pld	W	L	Pts	SW	SL	SR	SPW	SPL	SPR	Qualification
1	Japan	3	3	0	6	9	3	3.000	281	244	1.152	Semifinals
2	South Korea	3	2	1	5	8	3	2.667	256	222	1.153	Semifinals
3	Iran	3	1	2	4	4	7	0.571	241	257	0.938	5th–8th place
4	Indonesia	3	0	3	3	1	9	0.111	194	249	0.779	5th–8th place

Date	Time		Score		Set 1	Set 2	Set 3	Set 4	Set 5	Total
05 Sep	17:00	Iran	0–3	South Korea	22–25	23–25	11–25			56–75
05 Sep	17:00	Indonesia	0–3	Japan	20–25	15–25	17–25			52–75
06 Sep	19:00	Iran	1–3	Japan	21–25	22–25	25–22	20–25		88–97
06 Sep	19:00	Indonesia	0–3	South Korea	25–27	16–25	16–25			57–77

=== Pool F ===
Pos	Team	Pld	W	L	Pts	SW	SL	SR	SPW	SPL	SPR	Qualification
1	China	3	3	0	6	9	0	MAX	227	181	1.254	Semifinals
2	Australia	3	2	1	5	6	4	1.500	239	202	1.183	Semifinals
3	Chinese Taipei	3	1	2	4	3	6	0.500	180	212	0.849	5th–8th place
4	Pakistan	3	0	3	3	1	9	0.111	197	248	0.794	5th–8th place

Date	Time		Score		Set 1	Set 2	Set 3	Set 4	Set 5	Total
05 Sep	19:00	China	3–0	Chinese Taipei	25–17	25–21	25–18			75–56
05 Sep	19:00	Pakistan	1–3	Australia	25–23	17–25	16–25	18–25		76–98
06 Sep	17:00	China	3–0	Australia	25–20	27–25	25–21			77–66
06 Sep	17:00	Pakistan	0–3	Chinese Taipei	21–25	23–25	18–25			62–75

=== Pool G ===
Pos	Team	Pld	W	L	Pts	SW	SL	SR	SPW	SPL	SPR	Qualification
1	India	2	2	0	4	6	2	3.000	196	172	1.140	9th–12th place
2	Bahrain	2	1	1	3	4	4	1.000	182	186	0.978	9th–12th place
3	Qatar	2	0	2	2	2	6	0.333	170	190	0.895	

Date	Time		Score		Set 1	Set 2	Set 3	Set 4	Set 5	Total
05 Sep	15:00	Qatar	1–3	Bahrain	23–25	19–25	25–18	20–25		87–93
06 Sep	15:00	Qatar	1–3	India	19–25	25–22	16–25	23–25		83–97

=== Pool H ===
Pos	Team	Pld	W	L	Pts	SW	SL	SR	SPW	SPL	SPR	Qualification
1	Kazakhstan	2	2	0	4	6	2	3.000	197	175	1.126	9th–12th place
2	Sri Lanka	2	1	1	3	4	4	1.000	192	196	0.980	9th–12th place
3	Kuwait	2	0	2	2	2	6	0.333	183	201	0.910	

Date	Time		Score		Set 1	Set 2	Set 3	Set 4	Set 5	Total
05 Sep	15:00	Kazakhstan	3–1	Kuwait	25–19	23–25	25–22	25–20		98–86
06 Sep	15:00	Kazakhstan	3–1	Sri Lanka	25–19	24–26	25–22	25–22		99–89

== Final round ==
- The results and the points of the matches between the same teams that were already played during the previous rounds shall be taken into account for the final round.

=== Classification 13th–14th ===
Pos	Team	Pld	W	L	Pts	SW	SL	SR	SPW	SPL	SPR
13	Qatar	1	1	0	2	3	0	MAX	76	62	1.226
14	Kuwait	1	0	1	1	0	3	0.000	62	76	0.816

Date	Time		Score		Set 1	Set 2	Set 3	Set 4	Set 5	Total
08 Sep	11:00	Qatar	3–0	Kuwait	26–24	25–18	25–20			76–62

=== Classification 9th–12th ===
Pos	Team	Pld	W	L	Pts	SW	SL	SR	SPW	SPL	SPR
9	India	3	3	0	6	9	1	9.000	249	194	1.284
10	Bahrain	3	2	1	5	7	4	1.750	258	246	1.049
11	Kazakhstan	3	1	2	4	3	7	0.429	221	239	0.925
12	Sri Lanka	3	0	3	3	2	9	0.222	219	268	0.817

Date	Time		Score		Set 1	Set 2	Set 3	Set 4	Set 5	Total
08 Sep	15:00	India	3–0	Sri Lanka	25–14	25–21	25–14			75–49
08 Sep	15:00	Bahrain	3–0	Kazakhstan	25–21	25–23	25–22			75–66
09 Sep	11:00	Bahrain	3–1	Sri Lanka	19–25	25–21	25–17	25–18		94–81
09 Sep	11:00	India	3–0	Kazakhstan	25–19	25–23	25–14			75–56

=== Classification 5th–8th ===
Pos	Team	Pld	W	L	Pts	SW	SL	SR	SPW	SPL	SPR
5	Iran	3	3	0	6	9	4	2.250	305	273	1.117
6	Indonesia	3	2	1	5	7	7	1.000	305	295	1.034
7	Chinese Taipei	3	1	2	4	7	6	1.167	271	284	0.954
8	Pakistan	3	0	3	3	3	9	0.333	252	281	0.897

Date	Time		Score		Set 1	Set 2	Set 3	Set 4	Set 5	Total
08 Sep	17:00	Iran	3–1	Pakistan	20–25	25–18	25–18	28–26		98–87
08 Sep	17:00	Indonesia	3–2	Chinese Taipei	25–16	24–26	23–25	25–18	15–10	112–95
09 Sep	14:30	Indonesia	3–2	Pakistan	25–22	22–25	25–19	21–25	15–12	108–103
09 Sep	16:30	Iran	3–2	Chinese Taipei	20–25	25–17	22–25	25–18	18–16	110–101

=== Championship ===
Pos	Team	Pld	W	L	Pts	SW	SL	SR	SPW	SPL	SPR
1	China	3	2	1	5	7	3	2.333	234	228	1.026
2	Australia	3	2	1	5	6	4	1.500	246	233	1.056
3	South Korea	3	1	2	4	5	7	0.714	258	266	0.970
4	Japan	3	1	2	4	4	8	0.500	273	284	0.961

Date	Time		Score		Set 1	Set 2	Set 3	Set 4	Set 5	Total
08 Sep	19:00	Japan	1–3	Australia	31–29	23–25	19–25	24–26		97–105
08 Sep	19:00	South Korea	3–1	China	20–25	25–17	25–19	25–21		95–82
09 Sep	15:30	South Korea	0–3	Australia	22–25	20–25	17–25			59–75
09 Sep	17:30	Japan	0–3	China	22–25	23–25	22–25			67–75

== Final standing ==
Rank	Team
1st place, gold medalist(s)	China
2nd place, silver medalist(s)	Australia
3rd place, bronze medalist(s)	South Korea
4	Japan
5	Iran
6	Indonesia
7	Chinese Taipei
8	Pakistan
9	India
10	Bahrain
11	Kazakhstan
12	Sri Lanka
13	Qatar
14	Kuwait

Qualified for the 1999 World Cup and 2000 World Olympic Qualifier
Qualified for the 2000 World Olympic Qualifier (later withdrew and replaced by Chinese Taipei)
Already qualified for the 1999 World Cup as hosts and qualified for the 2000 World Olympic Qualifier
Already qualified as hosts for the 2000 Summer Olympics

Asian Men's champions

China
3rd title

== Awards ==
- MVP: (Iran) Behnam Mahmoudi
- Best scorer: (Australia) Benjamin Hardy
- Best spiker: (Australia) Benjamin Hardy
- Best blocker: (South Korea) Kim Se-jin
- Best server: (China) Zhu Gang
- Best setter: (China) Zhou Jianan
- Best digger: (Japan) Koichi Nishimura
- Best receiver: (China) Li Tieming
