= Australia men's national volleyball team =

National sports team

Australia
- Nickname(s): Volleyroos
- Association: Volleyball Australia (VA)
- Confederation: AVC
- Head coach: Daniel Ilott
- FIVB ranking: 42 (15 October 2026)

Uniforms
Home	Away

Summer Olympics
- Appearances: 3 (First in 2000)
- Best result: 8th (2000)

World Championship
- Appearances: 7 (First in 1982)
- Best result: 14th (2018)

World Cup
- Appearances: 3 (First in 2007)
- Best result: 8th (2007)

Asian Championship
- Appearances: 21 (First in 1975)
- Best result: (2007)
- www.volleyballaustralia.org.au
Honours
Asian Championship
Gold medal – first place	2007 Jakarta	Team
Silver medal – second place	1999 Tehran	Team
Silver medal – second place	2001 Changwon	Team
Silver medal – second place	2019 Tehran	Team
Bronze medal – third place	1997 Doha	Team
Oceania Championship
Gold medal – first place	2026 Mangilao	Team

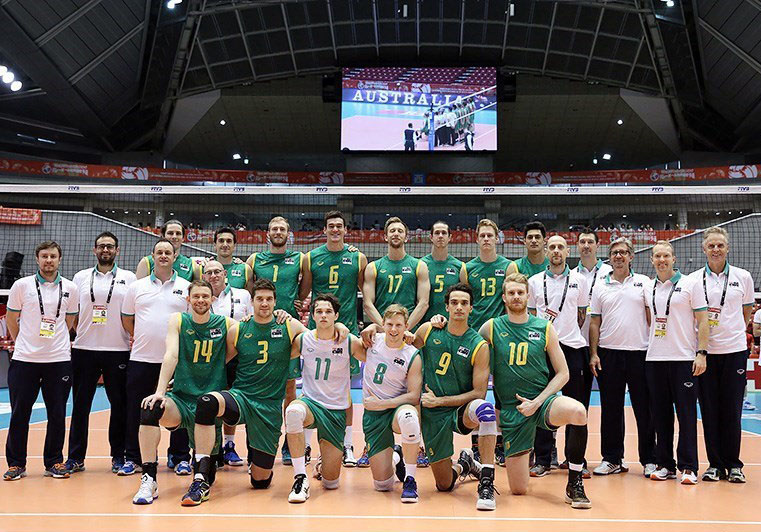
Japan, May 28, 2016

The Australia men's national volleyball team, also known as Volleyball Team Australia Men (VTAM) or the Volleyroos, is the national volleyball team of the volleyball-playing nation of Australia. As of September 2021, they are ranked 28th in the world. They are a member of the Asian Volleyball Confederation (AVC). Their best result came in 2007, when they won the Asian Men's Volleyball Championship.

The Volleyroos made a single appearance at the FIVB World League in 1999, but the financial ramifications of the event would not see them compete again in that competition for many years History. In 2014, Australia once again joined the World League. Their final ranking was 5th out of 28 teams. In 2015 Team Ginkle, they participated again and ranked 8th out of 32 teams. Picking up wins against Italy and silver medalist Serbia, they have shown they are approaching the ability to match some of the world's best teams. The Australian Volleyball Federation was founded in 1963, and the sport of volleyball has rapidly increased in popularity since then, particularly in schools and recreational centers.

== Tournament history ==
A red box around the year indicates tournaments played within Australia

=== Olympic Games ===
Olympic Games record									Qualification record				
Year	Round	Position	GP	MW	ML	SW	SL	Squad	GP	MW	ML	SW	SL
(Japan) 1964	Did not qualify								Did not enter				
(Mexico) 1968	Did not qualify								Unknown Asian qualifier				
(West Germany) 1972	Did not qualify								Did not qualify				
(Canada) 1976	Did not qualify								Did not qualify				
(Soviet Union) 1980	Did not qualify								Did not qualify				
(United States) 1984	Did not qualify								Did not qualify				
(South Korea) 1988	Did not qualify								Did not qualify				
(Spain) 1992	Did not qualify								5	1	4	5	13
(United States) 1996	Did not qualify								6	0	6	3	18
(Australia) 2000	Quarterfinals	8th	8	2	6	7	19	Squad	Qualified as host				
(Greece) 2004	Preliminary round	11th	5	0	5	2	15	Squad	7	5	2	15	9
(China) 2008	Did not qualify								7	3	4	11	13
(United Kingdom) 2012	Preliminary round	9th	5	2	3	8	10	Squad	7	5	2	15	8
(Brazil) 2016	Did not qualify								7	3	4	12	14
(Japan) 2020	Did not qualify								6	3	3	12	12
(France) 2024	Did not qualify								Did not qualify				
(United States) 2028	Future events								Future events				
(Australia) 2032	Automatically qualified as hosts								Qualified as host				
Total	0 Titles	4/14	18	4	14	17	44	—	45	20	25	73	87

=== World Championship ===
World Championship record
Year	Round	Position	Pld	W	L
(Czechoslovakia) 1949	Did not participate				
(Soviet Union) 1952	Did not participate				
(France) 1956	Did not participate				
(Brazil) 1960	Did not participate				
(Soviet Union) 1962	Did not participate				
(Czechoslovakia) 1966	Did not participate				
(Bulgaria) 1970	Did not qualify				
(Mexico) 1974	Did not qualify				
(Italy) 1978	Did not qualify				
(Argentina) 1982	21st place match	22nd	9	1	8
(France) 1986	Did not qualify				
(Brazil) 1990	Did not qualify				
(Greece) 1994	Did not qualify				
(Japan) 1998	First round	17th	3	1	2
(Argentina) 2002	First round	19th	3	0	3
(Japan) 2006	First round	21st	5	0	5
(Italy) 2010	First round	19th	3	0	3
(Poland) 2014	Second Round	15th	9	2	7
(Italy) (Bulgaria) 2018	Second Round	14th	8	3	5
(Poland) (Slovenia) 2022	Did not qualify				
(Philippines) 2025	Did not qualify				
(Poland) 2027	To be determined				
(Qatar) 2029	To be determined				
Total	0 Titles	7/23	41	7	33

=== World Cup ===
World Cup record
Year	Round	Position	Pld	W	L
(Poland) 1965	Did not participate				
(East Germany) 1969	Did not participate				
(Japan) 1977	Did not participate				
(Japan) 1981	Did not participate				
(Japan) 1985	Did not participate				
(Japan) 1989	Did not participate				
(Japan) 1991	Did not participate				
(Japan) 1995	Did not participate				
(Japan) 1999	Did not participate				
(Japan) 2003	Did not participate				
(Japan) 2007	Round robin	8th	11	4	7
(Japan) 2011	Did not participate				
(Japan) 2015	Round robin	9th	11	4	7
(Japan) 2019	Round robin	11th	11	2	9
Total	0 Titles	3/14	33	10	23

=== World League ===
World League record (Defunct)
Year	Position	GP	W	L	SW	SL
(Japan) 1990	Did not participate					
(Italy) 1991	Did not participate					
(Italy) 1992	Did not participate					
(Brazil) 1993	Did not participate					
(Italy) 1994	Did not participate					
(Brazil) 1995	Did not participate					
(Netherlands) 1996	Did not participate					
(Russia) 1997	Did not participate					
(Italy) 1998	Did not participate					
(Argentina) 1999	10th place	12	0	12	5	36
(Netherlands) 2000	Did not participate					
(Poland) 2001	Did not participate					
(Brazil) 2002	Did not participate					
(Spain) 2003	Did not participate					
(Italy) 2004	Did not participate					
(Serbia and Montenegro) 2005	Did not participate					
(Russia) 2006	Did not participate					
(Poland) 2007	Did not participate					
(Brazil) 2008	Did not participate					
(Serbia) 2009	Did not participate					
(Argentina) 2010	Did not participate					
(Poland) 2011	Did not participate					
(Poland) 2012	Did not participate					
(Argentina) 2013	Did not participate					
(Italy) 2014	5th place	16	7	9	27	37
(Brazil) 2015	8th place	12	2	10	11	32
(Poland) 2016	12th place	9	0	9	3	27
(Brazil) 2017	15th place	11	7	4	26	18
Total	5/28	60	16	44	72	150

=== Nations League ===
Nations League record
Year	Round	Position	GP	MW	ML	SW	SL	Squad
(France) 2018	Preliminary round	13th place	15	5	10	21	35	Squad
(United States) 2019	Preliminary round	13th place	15	3	12	20	37	Squad
(Italy) 2021	Preliminary round	16th place	15	1	14	7	44	Squad
(Italy) 2022	Relegated	16th place	12	1	11	8	35	Squad
(Poland) 2023	Did not qualify							
(Poland) 2024	Did not qualify							
(China) 2025	Did not qualify							
(China) 2026	Did not qualify							
Total	0 Titles	4/8	57	10	47	56	151	—

=== Challenger Cup ===
Challenger Cup record (Defunct)
Year	Position	GP	W	L	SW	SL
(Portugal) 2018	Did not participate (Participated in Nations League)					
(Slovenia) 2019	Did not participate (Participated in Nations League)					
(South Korea) 2022	5th place	1	0	1	2	3
(Qatar) 2023	Did not qualify					
(China) 2024	Did not qualify					
Total	1/5	1	0	1	2	3

=== Asian Championship ===
Asian Championship record
Year	Round	Position	Pld	W	L
(Australia) 1975	Group Stages	4th	6	3	3
(Bahrain) 1979	Final Group Stage	4th	6	3	3
(Japan) 1983	Classification 5th–8th	6th	7	3	4
(Kuwait) 1987	11th place match	11th	7	3	4
(South Korea) 1989	9th place match	10th	8	4	4
(Australia) 1991	3rd place match	4th	6	3	3
(Thailand) 1993	5th place match	6th	9	5	4
(South Korea) 1995	Classification 5th–8th	5th	3	1	2
(Qatar) 1997	3rd Place match	3rd	8	5	3
(Iran) 1999	Runner-Up	2nd	9	7	2
(South Korea) 2001	Runner-Up	2nd	7	5	2
(China) 2003	Final Group Stage	4th	9	5	4
(Thailand) 2005	7th place match	8th	9	3	6
(Indonesia) 2007	Champions	1st	9	8	1
(Philippines) 2009	7th place match	7th	9	4	5
(Iran) 2011	3rd place match	4th	9	7	2
(United Arab Emirates) 2013	5th place match	5th	7	5	2
(Iran) 2015	5th place match	5th	8	5	3
(Indonesia) 2017	7th place match	8th	8	3	5
(Iran) 2019	Runners-up	2nd	8	7	1
(Japan) 2021	5th place match	6th	7	4	3
(Iran) 2023	Did not participate				
(Japan) 2026	3rd place match	4th	6	3	3
Total	1 Title	22/23	165	96	69

=== Asian Nations Cup ===
Asian Nations Cup record
Year	Round	Position	Pld	W	L
(Sri Lanka) 2018	Did not participate				
(Kyrgyzstan) 2022	Did not participate				
(Taiwan) 2023	5th–8th places	5th	4	3	1
(Bahrain) 2024	5th–8th places	8th	5	2	3
(Bahrain) 2025	5th–8th places	5th	4	2	2
(India) 2026	Preliminary round	11th	5	0	5
Total	0 Titles	4/6	18	7	11

=== Asian Cup ===
Asian Cup record (Defunct)
Year	Round	Position	Pld	W	L
(Thailand) 2008	5th place match	5th	6	4	2
(Iran) 2010	5th place match	5th	6	4	2
(Vietnam) 2012	7th place match	7th	6	1	5
(Kazakhstan) 2014	7th place match	7th	6	1	5
(Thailand) 2016	5th place match	6th	6	1	5
(Taiwan) 2018	5th place match	6th	6	1	5
(Thailand) 2022	7th place match	8th	6	2	4
Total	0 Titles	7/7	42	14	28

=== Oceania Zonal Championship ===
Oceania Zonal Championship record
Year	Round	Position	Pld	W	L
(Guam) 2026	Champions	1st	5	5	0
Total	1 Title	1/1	5	5	0

== Team ==
=== Current roster ===
The following is the Australian Volleyroos Men roster for 2026.

No.	Name	Date of birth	Pos.	Height	Spike	Latest Club
4	Jackson Holland (C)	30 November 1998	L	1.90 m (6 ft 3 in)	358 cm (141 in)	(Germany) Baden Volleys SSC Karlsruhe
6	Ethan Garret	1 February 2001	OH	1.95 m (6 ft 5 in)	355 cm (140 in)	(South Korea) Incheon Korean Air Jumbos
7	James Weir	20 July 1995	MB	2.04 m (6 ft 8 in)	355 cm (140 in)	AS Cannes
8	Trent O'Dea	11 May 1994	MB	2.04 m (6 ft 8 in)	354 cm (139 in)	(South Korea) Busan OK Savings Bank OKman
9	Matthew Aubrey	18 August 1997	OP	2.10 m (6 ft 11 in)	355 cm (140 in)	(Finland) Kokkolan Tiikerit
10	Sam Flowerday	30 May 2002	OH	1.94 m (6 ft 4 in)	354 cm (139 in)	(Germany) VfB Friedrichshafen
16	Mitchell Croft	12 May 2005	OH	2.07 m (6 ft 9 in)	340 cm (130 in)	(United States) Hawaii Univ.
17	Joel McGruther	11 September 2006	MB	2.12 m (6 ft 11 in)	356 cm (140 in)	(Australia) Australian Volleyball Academy
19	William D'Arcy-Miles	25 February 2003	OP	2.11 m (6 ft 11 in)	366 cm (144 in)	AS Cannes
21	Nicholas Butler	27 June 1997	S	2.01 m (6 ft 7 in)	345 cm (136 in)	(Australia) Perth Steel
25	Ky Landers	25 February 2001	OH	1.85 m (6 ft 1 in)	342 cm (135 in)	(Australia) Chequers Volleyball Club
26	Billy Greber	17 January 2003	S	1.85 m (6 ft 1 in)	330 cm (130 in)	(Austria) VCA Amstetten NÖ
27	Max Senica	19 August 1999	OH	1.91 m (6 ft 3 in)	349 cm (137 in)	(Albania) KV Erzeni
40	Steven Yarad	10 September 2004	MB	2.06 m (6 ft 9 in)	345 cm (136 in)	(Canada) Fraser Valley Univ.

=== Staff ===
The following is the Australian Volleyroos Men Staff roster for 2026.

Position	Name
Head Coach	Dan Ilott
Assistant Coach	Brendan Garlick
Assistant Coach	Adrien Ickowicz
Physiotherapist	Natasha Hart
Statsician	Terrence A'Hearn
