= 1975 Asian Men's Volleyball Championship =

International volleyball tournament

Tournament details
- Host country: Australia
- City: Melbourne
- Dates: 17–28 August
- Teams: 7
- Venues: 2 (in 1 host city)

Final positions
- Champions: Japan (1st title)
- Runners-up: South Korea
- Third place: China
- Fourth place: Australia

The 1975 Asian Men's Volleyball Championship was the inaugural staging of the Asian Men's Volleyball Championship, a quadrennial international volleyball tournament organised by the Asian Volleyball Confederation (AVC) with Australia Volleyball Federation (AVF). The tournament was held in Melbourne, Australia from 17 to 28 August 1975.

== Results ==
Pos	Team	Pld	W	L	Pts	SW	SL	SR
1	Japan	6	6	0	12	18	1	18.000
2	South Korea	6	5	1	11	16	5	3.200
3	China	6	4	2	10	14	6	2.333
4	Australia	6	3	3	9	9	11	0.818
5	Philippines	6	2	4	8	8	12	0.667
6	Indonesia	6	1	5	7	3	16	0.188
7	New Zealand	6	0	6	6	1	18	0.056

Updated to match(es) played on unknown. Source:

Date		Score		Set 1	Set 2	Set 3	Set 4	Set 5	Total
17 Aug	Philippines	2–3	Australia	12–15	13–15	15–8	15–6	10–15	65–59
18 Aug	New Zealand	0–3	Japan	1–15	5–15	1–15			7–45
18 Aug	China	3–0	Indonesia	15–3	15–5	15–1			45–9
20 Aug	South Korea	3–0	Philippines	15–4	15–4	15–0			45–8
20 Aug	Japan	3–0	Indonesia	15–2	15–6	15–5			45–13
21 Aug	Indonesia	0–3	South Korea	4–15	4–15	2–15			10–45
21 Aug	Philippines	0–3	China	11–15	9–15	6–15			26–45
21 Aug	Australia	0–3	Japan	3–15	5–15	5–15			13–45
23 Aug	South Korea	3–0	Australia	15–5	15–3	15–5			45–13
23 Aug	Japan	3–0	China	15–4	15–6	15–9			45–19
24 Aug	China	3–0	Australia	15–4	15–4	15–5			45–13
24 Aug	Japan	3–0	Philippines	15–3	15–5	15–3			45–11
25 Aug	China	3–0	New Zealand	15–8	15–5	15–8			45–21
26 Aug	Indonesia	3–1	New Zealand	15–12	15–17	15–10	15–8		60–47
27 Aug	South Korea	3–2	China	15–11	15–7	13–15	10–15	15–9	68–57
28 Aug	Japan	3–1	South Korea	16–14	15–13	12–15	15–6		58–48
Aug	South Korea	3–0	New Zealand						
Aug	Australia	3–0	Indonesia						
Aug	Australia	3–0	New Zealand						
Aug	Philippines	3–0	Indonesia						

== Final standing ==
Rank	Team
1st place, gold medalist(s)	Japan
2nd place, silver medalist(s)	South Korea
3rd place, bronze medalist(s)	China
4	Australia
5	Philippines
6	Indonesia
7	New Zealand

Already qualified as defending champions for the 1976 Summer Olympics
Qualified for the 1976 Summer Olympics

1975 Asian Men's champions

Japan
1st title
