= 1993 Asian Men's Volleyball Championship =

International volleyball tournament

Tournament details
- Host country: Thailand
- City: Nakhon Ratchasima
- Dates: 11–19 September
- Teams: 16
- Venue: 1 (in 1 host city)

Final positions
- Champions: South Korea (2nd title)
- Runners-up: Kazakhstan
- Third place: Japan
- Fourth place: China

The Asian Men's Volleyball Championship was the seventh staging of the Asian Men's Volleyball Championship, a biennial international volleyball tournament organised by the Asian Volleyball Confederation (AVC) with Thailand Volleyball Association (TVA). The tournament was held in Nakhon Ratchasima, Thailand from 11 to 19 September 1993.

== Preliminary round ==
=== Pool A ===
Pos	Team	Pld	W	L	Pts	SW	SL	SR	SPW	SPL	SPR	Qualification
1	Thailand	2	2	0	4	0	0	—	0	0	—	Quarterfinals
2	Pakistan	2	1	1	3	0	0	—	0	0	—	Quarterfinals
3	Kuwait	2	0	2	2	0	0	—	0	0	—	

Date		Score		Set 1	Set 2	Set 3	Set 4	Set 5	Total
	Thailand	3–0	Pakistan						
	Pakistan	3–?	Kuwait						
	Thailand	3–?	Kuwait						

=== Pool B ===
Pos	Team	Pld	W	L	Pts	SW	SL	SR	SPW	SPL	SPR	Qualification
1	Japan	3	3	0	6	9	0	MAX	0	0	—	Quarterfinals
2	Iran	3	2	1	5	6	4	1.500	0	0	—	Quarterfinals
3	New Zealand	3	1	2	4	4	0	MAX	0	0	—	
4	Sri Lanka	3	0	3	3	0	9	0.000	0	0	—	

Date		Score		Set 1	Set 2	Set 3	Set 4	Set 5	Total
13 Sep	New Zealand	3–?	Sri Lanka						
13 Sep	Japan	3–0	Iran	15–2	15–3	15–8			45–13
14 Sep	Iran	3–1	New Zealand	15–8	10–15	15–11	15–8		55–42
14 Sep	Japan	3–0	Sri Lanka						
15 Sep	Iran	3–1	Sri Lanka	15–9	15–11	8–15	15–9		53–44
15 Sep	Japan	3–0	New Zealand	15–3	15–8	15–0			45–11

=== Pool C ===
Pos	Team	Pld	W	L	Pts	SW	SL	SR	SPW	SPL	SPR	Qualification
1	Kazakhstan	3	3	0	6	9	0	MAX	0	0	—	Quarterfinals
2	South Korea	3	2	1	5	7	3	2.333	0	0	—	Quarterfinals
3	India	3	1	2	4	3	8	0.375	0	0	—	
4	Chinese Taipei	3	0	3	3	0	9	0.000	0	0	—	

Date		Score		Set 1	Set 2	Set 3	Set 4	Set 5	Total
13 Sep	Kazakhstan	3–?	Chinese Taipei						
13 Sep	South Korea	3–0	India	15–3	15–13	15–6			45–22
14 Sep	Kazakhstan	3–0	India						
14 Sep	South Korea	3–0	Chinese Taipei	15–11	15–10	15–1			45–22
15 Sep	India	3–2	Chinese Taipei	3–15	15–6	8–15	15–7	15–4	56–47
15 Sep	Kazakhstan	3–1	South Korea	15–11	12–15	16–14	15–10		58–50

=== Pool D ===
Pos	Team	Pld	W	L	Pts	SW	SL	SR	SPW	SPL	SPR	Qualification
1	China	4	4	0	8	12	0	MAX	0	0	—	Quarterfinals
2	Australia	4	3	1	7	9	3	3.000	0	0	—	Quarterfinals
3	Qatar	4	2	2	6	6	0	MAX	0	0	—	
4	Philippines	4	1	3	5	4	0	MAX	0	0	—	
5	Bangladesh	4	0	4	4	0	12	0.000	0	0	—	

Date		Score		Set 1	Set 2	Set 3	Set 4	Set 5	Total
11 Sep	Australia	3–0	Philippines	15–10	15–0	15–2			45–12
11 Sep	China	3–0	Bangladesh						
12 Sep	Bangladesh	0–3	Australia	4–15	4–15	13–15			21–45
12 Sep	Qatar	0–3	China	6–15	7–15	4–15			17–45
13 Sep	Philippines	3–?	Bangladesh						
13 Sep	Australia	3–0	Qatar	15–7	15–5	15–5			45–17
14 Sep	Bangladesh	?–3	Qatar						
14 Sep	Philippines	0–3	China						
15 Sep	Qatar	3–1	Philippines	15–6	12–15	15–12	15–10		57–43
15 Sep	China	3–0	Australia	15–11	15–7	15–9			45–27

== Quarterfinals ==
- The results and the points of the matches between the same teams that were already played during the preliminary round shall be taken into account for the Quarter-finals.

=== Pool E ===
Pos	Team	Pld	W	L	Pts	SW	SL	SR	SPW	SPL	SPR	Qualification
1	Kazakhstan	3	3	0	6	0	0	—	0	0	—	Championship round
2	South Korea	3	2	1	5	0	0	—	0	0	—	Championship round
3	Thailand	3	1	2	4	0	0	—	0	0	—	5th–8th classification
4	Pakistan	3	0	3	3	0	0	—	0	0	—	5th–8th classification

Date		Score		Set 1	Set 2	Set 3	Set 4	Set 5	Total
16 Sep	Thailand	0–3	South Korea	8–15	10–15	4–15			22–45
16 Sep	Pakistan	0–3	Kazakhstan						
17 Sep	Pakistan	0–3	South Korea						
17 Sep	Thailand	0–3	Kazakhstan	0–15	9–15	0–15			9–45

=== Pool F ===
Pos	Team	Pld	W	L	Pts	SW	SL	SR	SPW	SPL	SPR	Qualification
1	Japan	3	3	0	6	9	0	MAX	0	0	—	Championship round
2	China	3	2	1	5	6	3	2.000	0	0	—	Championship round
3	Australia	3	1	2	4	3	6	0.500	91	135	0.674	5th–8th classification
4	Iran	3	0	3	3	0	9	0.000	0	0	—	5th–8th classification

Date		Score		Set 1	Set 2	Set 3	Set 4	Set 5	Total
16 Sep	Japan	3–0	Australia	15–4	15–4	15–9			45–17
16 Sep	Iran	0–3	China	6–15	4–15	8–15			18–45
17 Sep	Iran	0–3	Australia	14–16	7–15	14–16			35–47
17 Sep	Japan	3–0	China	15–13	15–10	15–9			45–32

== Final round ==
=== Classification 5th–8th ===
5th–8th places
18 September – Nakhon Ratchasima
Thailand	0
Iran	3
18 September – Nakhon Ratchasima
Australia	3
Pakistan	0

5th place
19 September – Nakhon Ratchasima
Iran	3
Australia	0
7th place
19 September – Nakhon Ratchasima
Thailand	3
Pakistan	1

==== 5th-8th place semifinals ====
Date		Score		Set 1	Set 2	Set 3	Set 4	Set 5	Total
18 Sep	Thailand	0–3	Iran	5–15	14–16	7–15			26–46
18 Sep	Australia	3–0	Pakistan	15–12	15–6	15–3			45–21

==== 7th place ====
Date		Score		Set 1	Set 2	Set 3	Set 4	Set 5	Total
19 Sep	Thailand	3–1	Pakistan	15–9	11–15	15–12	15–13		56–49

==== 5th place ====
Date		Score		Set 1	Set 2	Set 3	Set 4	Set 5	Total
19 Sep	Iran	3–0	Australia	15–13	16–14	16–14			47–41

=== Championship ===
Semifinals
18 September – Nakhon Ratchasima
Kazakhstan	3
China	?
18 September – Nakhon Ratchasima
Japan	1
South Korea	3

Final
19 September – Nakhon Ratchasima
Kazakhstan	0
South Korea	3
3rd place
19 September – Nakhon Ratchasima
China	2
Japan	3

==== Semifinals ====
Date		Score		Set 1	Set 2	Set 3	Set 4	Set 5	Total
18 Sep	Kazakhstan	3–1	China	9–15	15–11	15–10	15–9		54–45
18 Sep	Japan	1–3	South Korea	15–12	14–16	7–15	8–15		44–58

==== Third-place match ====
Date		Score		Set 1	Set 2	Set 3	Set 4	Set 5	Total
19 Sep	China	2–3	Japan	11–15	15–7	15–11	10–15	10–15	61–63

==== Final ====
Date		Score		Set 1	Set 2	Set 3	Set 4	Set 5	Total
19 Sep	Kazakhstan	0–3	South Korea	11–15	5–15	13–15			29–45

== Final standing ==
Rank	Team
1st place, gold medalist(s)	South Korea
2nd place, silver medalist(s)	Kazakhstan
3rd place, bronze medalist(s)	Japan
4	China
5	Iran
6	Australia
7	Thailand
8	Pakistan
9	India
10	Chinese Taipei
11	New Zealand
12	Qatar
13	Sri Lanka
14	Kuwait
15	Philippines
16	Bangladesh

Qualified for the 1994 World Championship
Qualified for the 1994 World Championship Qualifier (Kazakhstan later withdrew and replaced by Chinese Taipei)

1993 Asian Men's champions

South Korea
2nd title
