= Kosuke Tomonaga =

Japanese volleyball player (born 1980)

Personal information
- Nationality: Japanese
- Born: 22 July 1980 (age 46) Omura, Japan

Sport
- Sport: Volleyball

Kosuke Tomonaga (born 22 July 1980) is a Japanese volleyball player. He competed in the men's tournament at the 2008 Summer Olympics.
