= 1995 Asian Men's Volleyball Championship =

International volleyball tournament

Tournament details
- Host country: South Korea
- City: Seoul
- Dates: 11–23 September
- Teams: 14
- Venue: (in 1 host city)

Final positions
- Champions: Japan (5th title)
- Runners-up: China
- Third place: South Korea
- Fourth place: Iran

The Asian Men's Volleyball Championship was the eight staging of the Asian Men's Volleyball Championship, a biennial international volleyball tournament organised by the Asian Volleyball Confederation (AVC) with Korea Volleyball Association (KVA). The tournament was held in Seoul, South Korea from 11 to 23 September 1995.

== Preliminary round ==
=== Pool A ===
| Pos | Team | Pld | W | L | Pts | SW | SL | SR | SPW | SPL | SPR | Qualification |
|---|---|---|---|---|---|---|---|---|---|---|---|---|
| 1 | South Korea | 2 | 2 | 0 | 4 | 0 | 0 | — | 0 | 0 | — | Quarter-finals |
| 2 | Chinese Taipei | 2 | 1 | 1 | 3 | 0 | 0 | — | 0 | 0 | — | Quarter-finals |
| 3 | Sri Lanka | 2 | 0 | 2 | 2 | 0 | 0 | — | 0 | 0 | — | |

=== Pool B ===
| Pos | Team | Pld | W | L | Pts | SW | SL | SR | SPW | SPL | SPR | Qualification |
|---|---|---|---|---|---|---|---|---|---|---|---|---|
| 1 | Iran | 3 | 3 | 0 | 6 | 0 | 0 | — | 0 | 0 | — | Quarter-finals |
| 2 | Australia | 3 | 2 | 1 | 5 | 0 | 0 | — | 0 | 0 | — | Quarter-finals |
| 3 | Philippines | 3 | 1 | 2 | 4 | 0 | 0 | — | 0 | 0 | — | |
| 4 | Kuwait | 3 | 0 | 3 | 3 | 0 | 0 | — | 0 | 0 | — | |

=== Pool C ===
| Pos | Team | Pld | W | L | Pts | SW | SL | SR | SPW | SPL | SPR | Qualification |
|---|---|---|---|---|---|---|---|---|---|---|---|---|
| 1 | Japan | 2 | 2 | 0 | 4 | 0 | 0 | — | 0 | 0 | — | Quarter-finals |
| 2 | Pakistan | 2 | 1 | 1 | 3 | 0 | 0 | — | 0 | 0 | — | Quarter-finals |
| 3 | New Zealand | 2 | 0 | 2 | 2 | 0 | 0 | — | 0 | 0 | — | |

=== Pool D ===
| Pos | Team | Pld | W | L | Pts | SW | SL | SR | SPW | SPL | SPR | Qualification |
|---|---|---|---|---|---|---|---|---|---|---|---|---|
| 1 | China | 2 | 2 | 0 | 4 | 0 | 0 | — | 0 | 0 | — | Quarter-finals |
| 2 | Thailand | 2 | 1 | 1 | 3 | 0 | 0 | — | 0 | 0 | — | Quarter-finals |
| 3 | Qatar | 2 | 0 | 2 | 2 | 0 | 0 | — | 0 | 0 | — | |

== Quarter-finals ==
- The results and the points of the matches between the same teams that were already played during the preliminary round shall be taken into account for the Quarter-finals.

=== Pool E ===
| Pos | Team | Pld | W | L | Pts | SW | SL | SR | SPW | SPL | SPR | Qualification |
|---|---|---|---|---|---|---|---|---|---|---|---|---|
| 1 | China | 3 | 3 | 0 | 6 | 0 | 0 | — | 0 | 0 | — | Championship round |
| 2 | South Korea | 3 | 2 | 1 | 5 | 0 | 0 | — | 0 | 0 | — | Championship round |
| 3 | Chinese Taipei | 3 | 1 | 2 | 4 | 0 | 0 | — | 0 | 0 | — | 5th–8th classification |
| 4 | Thailand | 3 | 0 | 3 | 3 | 0 | 0 | — | 0 | 0 | — | 5th–8th classification |

| Date | | Score | | Set 1 | Set 2 | Set 3 | Set 4 | Set 5 | Total |
|---|---|---|---|---|---|---|---|---|---|
| | China | 3–? | Chinese Taipei | | | | | | |
| | South Korea | 3–1 | Thailand | 13–15 | 17–16 | 15–2 | 15–0 | | 60–33 |
| | China | 3–1 | South Korea | 16–14 | 15–7 | 11–15 | 15–9 | | 57–45 |
| | Chinese Taipei | 3–? | Thailand | | | | | | |

=== Pool F ===
| Pos | Team | Pld | W | L | Pts | SW | SL | SR | SPW | SPL | SPR | Qualification |
|---|---|---|---|---|---|---|---|---|---|---|---|---|
| 1 | Japan | 3 | 3 | 0 | 6 | 0 | 0 | — | 0 | 0 | — | Championship round |
| 2 | Iran | 3 | 2 | 1 | 5 | 0 | 0 | — | 0 | 0 | — | Championship round |
| 3 | Australia | 3 | 1 | 2 | 4 | 0 | 0 | — | 0 | 0 | — | 5th–8th classification |
| 4 | Pakistan | 3 | 0 | 3 | 3 | 0 | 0 | — | 0 | 0 | — | 5th–8th classification |

| Date | | Score | | Set 1 | Set 2 | Set 3 | Set 4 | Set 5 | Total |
|---|---|---|---|---|---|---|---|---|---|
| | Japan | 3–? | Australia | | | | | | |
| | Iran | 3–2 | Pakistan | | | | | | |
| | Japan | 3–0 | Iran | | | | | | |
| | Australia | 3–? | Pakistan | | | | | | |

== Final round ==
- The results and the points of the matches between the same teams that were already played during the previous rounds shall be taken into account for the final round.

=== Classification 5th–8th ===
| Pos | Team | Pld | W | L | Pts | SW | SL | SR | SPW | SPL | SPR |
|---|---|---|---|---|---|---|---|---|---|---|---|
| 5 | Australia | 0 | 0 | 0 | 0 | 0 | 0 | — | 0 | 0 | — |
| 6 | Chinese Taipei | 0 | 0 | 0 | 0 | 0 | 0 | — | 0 | 0 | — |
| 7 | Thailand | 0 | 0 | 0 | 0 | 0 | 0 | — | 0 | 0 | — |

=== Championship ===
| Pos | Team | Pld | W | L | Pts | SW | SL | SR | SPW | SPL | SPR |
|---|---|---|---|---|---|---|---|---|---|---|---|
| 1st place, gold medalist(s) | Japan | 3 | 3 | 0 | 6 | 0 | 0 | — | 0 | 0 | — |
| 2nd place, silver medalist(s) | China | 3 | 2 | 1 | 5 | 0 | 0 | — | 0 | 0 | — |
| 3rd place, bronze medalist(s) | South Korea | 3 | 1 | 2 | 4 | 4 | 6 | 0.667 | 0 | 0 | — |
| 4 | Iran | 3 | 0 | 3 | 3 | 0 | 9 | 0.000 | 0 | 0 | — |

| Date | | Score | | Set 1 | Set 2 | Set 3 | Set 4 | Set 5 | Total |
|---|---|---|---|---|---|---|---|---|---|
| 22 Sep | China | 3–0 | Iran | | | | | | |
| 22 Sep | South Korea | 0–3 | Japan | 8–15 | 7–15 | 11–15 | | | 26–45 |
| 23 Sep | South Korea | 3–0 | Iran | 15–9 | 15–13 | 15–9 | | | 45–31 |
| 23 Sep | China | ?–3 | Japan | | | | | | |

== Final standing ==
| Rank | Team |
|---|---|
| 1st place, gold medalist(s) | Japan |
| 2nd place, silver medalist(s) | China |
| 3rd place, bronze medalist(s) | South Korea |
| 4 | Iran |
| 5 | Australia |
| 6 | Chinese Taipei |
| 7 | Thailand |
| 8 | Pakistan |
| 9 | Sri Lanka |
| 10 | Qatar |
| 11 | Philippines |
| 12 | New Zealand |
| 13 | Kuwait |
| 14 | Kazakhstan |

| Qualified for the 1995 World Cup |
| Already qualified as hosts for the 1995 World Cup |

1995 Asian Men's champions

Japan
5th title
