= Kenta Takanashi =

Japanese volleyball player (born 1997)

Personal information
- Full name: Kenta Takanashi
- Nationality: Japanese
- Born: 25 March 1997 (age 29); Yamagata, Japan
- Height: 1.90 m (6 ft 3 in)
- Weight: 85 kg (187 lb)
- Spike: 343 cm (135 in)
- Block: 320 cm (130 in)
- Education: Nippon Sport Science University

Volleyball information
- Position: Wing spiker/Outside hitter
- Current club: (Japan) Nippon Steel Sakai Blazers
- Number: 7 (national); 7 (club)

Career
Years	Teams
2015–2019	(Japan) Nippon Sport Science University
2019–2024	(Japan) Wolf Dogs Nagoya
2025–present	(Japan) Nippon Steel Sakai Blazers

National team
2015–2017	Japan U19-U23 national team
2020–present	Japan national volleyball team
Medal record
Men's volleyball
Representing Japan
Asian Championship
Silver medal – second place	2021 Chiba/Funabashi	Team
Asian Games
Bronze medal – third place	2022 Hangzhou	Team
Asian Cup
Bronze medal – third place	2016 Nakhon Pathom	Team
Asian U23 Championship
Bronze medal – third place	2019 Naypyidaw	Team

Kenta Takanashi (高梨 健太, Takanashi Kenta; born 25 March 1997) is a Japanese male volleyball player. He plays in V.League Division 1 for Wolf Dogs Nagoya and Japan men's national volleyball team. He was the captain of Japan U-21 national team.

== Awards ==
=== Club ===
- 2022–23 Japanese Championship, with Wolfdogs Nagoya

== National teams ==
- Japan men's national under-19 volleyball team (2015)
- Japan men's national under-20 volleyball team (2016)
  - 2016 Asian Men's U20 Volleyball Championship
- Japan men's national under-21 volleyball team (2015–2017)
  - 2015 FIVB Volleyball Men's U21 World Championship
  - 2017 FIVB Volleyball Men's U21 World Championship
- Japan men's national under-23 volleyball team (2017)
  - 2017 FIVB Volleyball Men's U23 World Championship
- Japan universiade national team (2019)
  - 2019 Summer Universiade Tournament
- Japan men's national senior volleyball team (2016, 2020–present)
