= Javad Karimi =

Iranian volleyball player (born 1998)

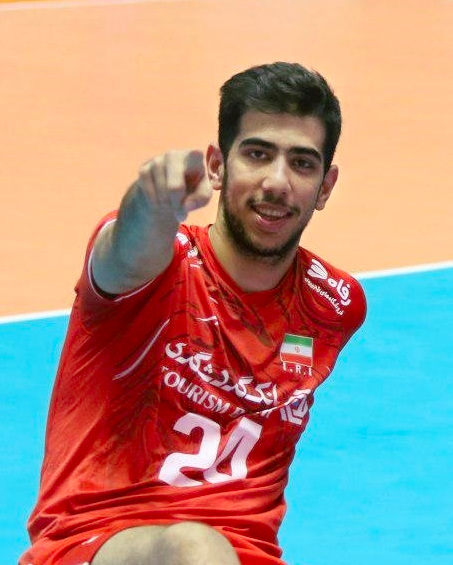

Personal information
- Full name: Javad Karimi Souchelmaei
- Born: March 1, 1998 (age 28); Neka, Iran
- Height: 2.04 m (6 ft 8 in)
- Weight: 104 kg (229 lb)
- Spike: 3.30 m (130 in)
- Block: 3.10 m (122 in)

Volleyball information
- Position: Setter
- Current club: (Brazil) Minas
- Number: 14

Career
Years	Teams
–2018; 2018–2020; 2020–2022; 2022–2024; 2024–	(Iran) Kalleh Mazandaran (Iran) Paykan Tehran (Belgium) Greenyard Maaseik (Poland) Warta Zawiercie (Brazil) Minas

National team
2014–2015; 2014–2017; 2017; 2018–	Iran U19; Iran U21; Iran U23; Iran
Honours
Representing Iran
Men's volleyball
Asian Championship
Gold medal – first place	2019 Iran	Team
Gold medal – first place	2021 Japan	Team
Asian Games
Gold medal – first place	2022 Hangzhou	Team
Asian Cup
Silver medal – second place	2018 Taipei	Team

Javad Karimi Souchelmaei (Persian: جواد کریمی سوچلمایی, born March 1, 1998, in Sari) is an Iranian volleyball player who plays as a setter for the Iranian national team and Brazilian club Minas Tênis Clube.

He played for Iranian national team in the 2019 FIVB Volleyball Nations League.

== Honours ==
=== National team ===
- Asian Championship
  - Gold medal (2): 2019, 2021
- Asian Cup
  - Silver medal (1): 2018
- Islamic Solidarity Games
  - Gold medal (1): 2017
- Asian U23 Championship
  - Gold medal (1): 2017
- Asian U20 Championship
  - Gold medal (1): 2014
  - Silver medal (1): 2016
- U19 World Championship
  - Bronze medal (1): 2015
- Asian U18 Championship
  - Gold medal (1): 2014

=== Individual ===
- Best setter: 2014 Asian U18 Championship
- Best setter: 2016 Asian U20 Championship
- Best setter: 2018 Asian Cup
- Best setter: 2021 Asian Championship
