= Thailand men's national under-23 volleyball team =

Thailand Under-23
- Association: Thailand Volleyball Association
- Confederation: AVC
- Head coach: Monchai Supajirakul

Uniforms
Home	Away	Third

FIVB U23 World Championship
- Appearances: 0

Asian Championship
- Appearances: 2 (First in 2015)
- Best result: 4th (2017)

The Thailand men's national under-23 volleyball team (Thai: วอลเลย์บอลชายทีมชาติไทยรุ่นอายุไม่เกิน 23 ปี) represents the Thailand for the under-23 and 22 level in international volleyball competitions. It is managed by the Thailand Volleyball Association.

== Team ==
=== Coaching staff ===
Position	Name
Head coach	(Thailand) Monchai Supajirakul
Team manager	(Thailand) Chartchai Rodboonpha
Assistant coach	(Thailand) Khjorns Manapornchai (Thailand) Weeram Phergsongkror
Doctor	(Thailand) Chakarg Pongurgsorn
Physiotherapist	(Thailand) Techit Techachaipak

=== Current squad ===
The following 12 players were called up for the 2017 Asian Men's U23 Volleyball Championship in Ardabil, Iran.

== Record against selected opponents ==
Record against opponents in Asian Championships:

== See also ==
- Thailand men's national volleyball team
- Thailand women's national under-23 volleyball team
- Thailand men's national under-21 volleyball team
- Thailand men's national under-19 volleyball team
