= Cichello =

Cichello is an Italian surname. Notable people with the surname include:

- Esteban Cichello, Argentine philologist and polyglot
- Juan Manuel Cichello (born 1975), Argentine retired volleyball player
