= Asian U23 Volleyball Championship =

Asian U23 Volleyball Championship may refer to:

- Asian Men's U23 Volleyball Championship, the official competition for under 23 men's national volleyball teams of Asia and Oceania, organized by the Asian Volleyball Confederation (AVC)
- Asian Women's U23 Volleyball Championship, the official competition for under 23 women's national volleyball teams of Asia and Oceania, organized by the Asian Volleyball Confederation (AVC)
