= Amin Esmaeilnezhad =

Iranian professional volleyball player (born 1996)

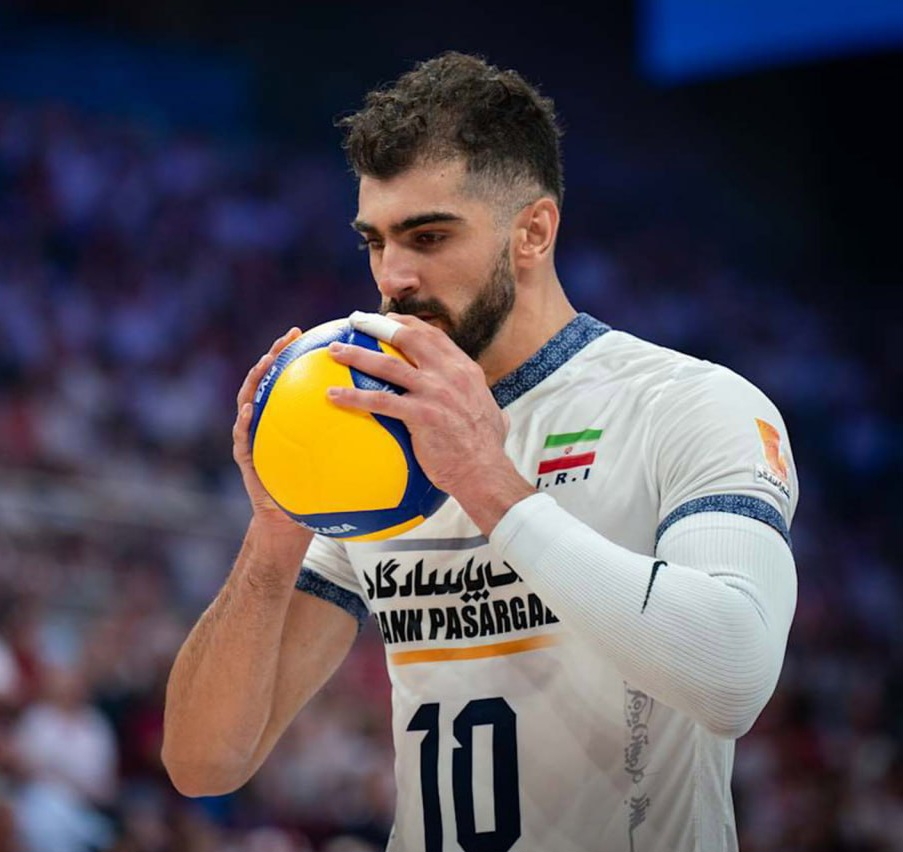
- Amin in VNL 2025

Personal information
- Nickname: dragon
- Nationality: Iranian
- Born: 17 December 1996 (age 29); Malekan, Iran
- Height: 202 cm (6 ft 8 in)
- Weight: 93 kg (205 lb)
- Spike: 383 cm (151 in)
- Block: 357 cm (141 in)

Volleyball information
- Position: Opposite

Career
Years	Teams
2017-2019	(Iran) Paykan Tehran
2019-2021	(Iran) Saipa Tehran
2021-2022	(Iran) Shahdab Yazd
2022-2023	(Iran) Pas Gorgan
2023-2024	(Italy) Rana Verona
2024-	(Poland) PGE Skra Bełchatów

National team
2016-2020	Iran U23
2016-	Iran
Honours
Men's volleyball
Representing Iran
Asian Championship
Gold medal – first place	2021 Japan	Team
Silver medal – second place	2023 Iran	Team
Silver medal – second place	2026 JPN	Team
Asian U23 Championship
Gold medal – first place	2017 Iran	Team
AVC Cup
Gold medal – first place	2016 Nakhon Pathom	Team
Hubert Wagner Memorial
Bronze medal – third place	2022 Poland	Team
Asian Games
Gold medal – first place	2022 Hangzhou	Team
Gold medal – first place	2026 JPN	Team

Amin Esmaeilnezhad (Persian: امین اسماعیل‌نژاد; born 17 December 1996 in Malekan) is an Iranian professional volleyball player whose current club is Verona.

== Honours ==
=== National team ===
- Asian Championship
  - Gold medal (1): 2021
  - Silver medal (1): 2023
- Asian U23 Championship
  - Gold medal (1): 2017
- Hubert Wagner Memorial
  - Bronze medal (1): 2022
- Asian Games
  - Gold medal (1): 2023

=== Club ===
- Iranian Super League
  - Champion (1): 2022 (Shahdab Yazd)
  - Third place (2): 2018 (Paykan Tehran), 2023 (Pas Gorgan)
- Asian Championship
  - Bronze medal (1): 2022

=== Individual ===
- Best opposite: 2017 Asian U23 Championship
- Best opposite: 2022 Iranian Super League
- Most valuable player: 2022 Iranian Super League
- Best scorer: 2022 Hubert Wagner
- Best opposite: 2023 Iranian Super League
- Best opposite: 2023 Asian Championship
