= Naser Rahimipanah =

Iranian volleyball player (born 1991)

Personal information
- Full name: Naser Rahimipanah
- Born: June 27, 1991 (age 35) Kashan, Iran
- Height: 1.91 m (6 ft 3 in)
- Weight: 73 kg (161 lb)
- Spike: 326 cm (128 in)
- Block: 310 cm (122 in)

Volleyball information
- Position: Libero
- Current club: Persepolis
- Number: 15

Career
- Years: Team
- 2012–2013: (Iran) Barij Essence Kashan
- 2013–2014: (Iran) Kalleh Mazandaran
- 2018–2019: (Iran) Khatam Ardakan
- 2020–2021: (Iran) Shahdab Yazd
- 2022–2023: (Iran) Hoorsun Ramsar
- 2023–2024: (Iran) Sepehr Sadra
- 2024–2025: (Iran) Chadormalu Ardakan
- 2026–: (Iran) Persepolis

National team
- Years: Team
- 2013: Iran U23
- 2013: Iran

Naser Rahimipanah (Persian: ناصر رحیمی‌پناه; born 27 June 1991 in Kashan) is an Iranian volleyball player who plays as a libero for Persepolis in the Iranian Volleyball First Division League.

== Club career ==
Rahimipanah began his professional career with Barij Essence Kashan and later joined various teams including Shahrdari Tabriz, Bargh Kerman, Aluminium Hormozgan, Khatam Ardakan, Sari Municipal Development Organization, Shahdab Yazd, Hoorsun Ramsar, Nian Electronic Mashhad, and Chadormalu Ardakan. He played for Chadormalu Ardakan in the 2024–2025 season.

In October 2026, Rahimipanah was included in the final squad of Persepolis for the Iranian Men's First Division.

== International career ==
=== Iran U23 ===
Rahimipanah played for the Iran U23 team at the 2013 FIVB Volleyball Men's U23 World Championship, where Iran finished fifth.

=== Senior national team ===
Rahimipanah has been called up to the Iran national volleyball team. In 2013, then-head coach Julio Velasco invited him as a libero and successor to Farhad Zarif.

He was included in the initial 20-man squad for the FIVB World Grand Champions Cup.

In November 2013, he was named in Velasco's final 14-man squad for the tournament.

== Honours ==
=== Team ===
- Fourth place at the 2013 FIVB World Grand Champions Cup
- Fifth place at the 2013 FIVB Men's U23 World Championship

=== Individual ===
- Best digger at the 2013 FIVB Men's U23 World Championship
- Best digger in the first half of the 2023–24 Iranian Volleyball Super League
