= Iran men's national under-23 volleyball team =

Iran
- Association: IRIVF
- Confederation: AVC
- Head coach: Rodrigo Delionma

Uniforms
Home	Away	Third

The Iran men's national under-23 volleyball team represents Iran in international men's volleyball competitions and friendly matches under the age 23 and it is ruled by the Iranian Volleyball Federation.

== Results ==
=== FIVB U23 World Championship ===
Champions Runners up Third place Fourth place

FIVB U23 World Championship
Year	Round	Position	Pld	W	L	SW	SL	Squad
(Brazil) 2013	Group Stages	5th place	7	5	2	16	7	Squad
(United Arab Emirates) 2015	Group Stages	7th place	7	4	3	12	15	Squad
(Egypt) 2017	Group Stages	7th place	7	5	2	25	13	Squad
Total	0 Titles	3/3	21	14	7	53	35	

=== Asian U23 Championship ===
Champions Runners up Third place Fourth place

Asian U23 Championship
Year	Round	Position	Pld	W	L	SW	SL	Squad
(Myanmar) 2015	Final	Champions	6	6	0	18	2	Squad
(Iran) 2017	Final	Champions	6	6	0	18	1	Squad
(Myanmar) 2019	Did not enter							
Total	2 Titles	2/3	12	12	0	36	3	

=== Asian Championship ===
Champions Runners up Third place Fourth place

Asian Championship
Year	Round	Position	Pld	W	L	SW	SL	Squad
(Australia) 1975 to (Iran) 2015	Did not enter (Represented by Senior team)							
(Indonesia) 2017	Quarterfinals	5th place	8	6	2	20	10	Squad
(Iran) 2019	Did not enter (Represented by Senior team)							
Total	0 Titles	1/19	8	6	2	20	10	

== Team ==
=== Current squad ===
The following is the Iranian roster in the 2019 Asian Men's Volleyball Championship

Head coach:

== Head coaches ==
Name	From–To	notes
(Iran) Peyman Akbari	2013–2015	2015 Asian U23 Championship Champions
(Argentina) Juan Manuel Cichello	2017–2018	2017 Asian U23 Championship Champions
