= Juan Manuel Cichello =

Argentine volleyball player (born 1975)

Juan Cichello
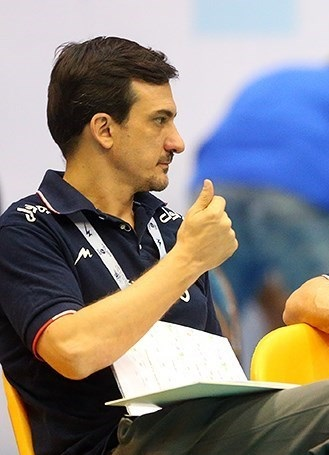

Personal information
- Full name: Juan Manuel Cichello
- Born: November 1, 1975 (age 50); Argentina

Coaching information
Previous teams coached
Years	Teams
2006–2011; 2008; 2011; 2011–2014; 2012–2014; 2014–2015; 2015–2017; 2017–2018; 2017–	Argentina Junior & Youth; Argentina; Giti Pasand; Iran (assistant) (Italy) Pallavolo Molfetta; Qatar; Iran (assistant); U23 (Italy) Emma Villas Volley
- Last updated: 9 May 2017

Juan Manuel Cichello (born November 1, 1975) is a former Argentine volleyball player (setter), current head coach of Emma Villas Volley Club. The Argentine has served as assistant coach of Julio Velasco in Iran national volleyball team from 2011 to 2014. He was also assistant of his countryman Raul Lozano in Team Melli during the Rio 2016 Summer Olympics. He made a major contribution in promoting Molfetta from Serie A2 to A1 in 2012 and led the team in 2013-14 season.

== Career as coach ==
In 2006-2011 worked with Argentina Junior & Youth.

- Argentina Youth

Boys' Youth South American Volleyball Championship

winner: 2008, 2010
runner-up: 2006

FIVB Volleyball Boys' U19 World Championship

third place: 2009
fourth place: 2007

- Argentina Junior

Men's Junior South American Volleyball Championship

winner: 2008
runner-up: 2006, 2010

FIVB Volleyball Men's U21 World Championship

runner-up: 2011
third place: 2009

- Argentina

Volleyball America's Cup

fourth place: 2008

- Qatar

Asian Men's Volleyball Championship

fourth place: 2015

- Iran U23

Asian Men's U23 Volleyball Championship

winner: 2017

Asian Men's Volleyball Championship

5th place: 2017
