= 2021 Asian Men's Volleyball Championship =

International volleyball tournament

バレーボールアジア選手権 日本 2021
- Official logo

Tournament details
- Host country: Japan
- Cities: Chiba and Funabashi
- Dates: 12–19 September
- Teams: 16 (from 1 confederation)
- Venue: 2 (in 2 host cities)

Final positions
- Champions: Iran (4th title)
- Runners-up: Japan
- Third place: China
- Fourth place: Chinese Taipei

Tournament awards
- MVP: (Iran) Saber Kazemi
- Best Setter: (Iran) Javad Karimi
- Best OH: (Iran) Milad Ebadipour (Japan) Yūki Ishikawa
- Best MB: (Iran) Aliasghar Mojarad (China) Li Yongzhen
- Best OPP: (Japan) Kento Miyaura
- Best Libero: (Iran) Mohammad Reza Hazratpour

Tournament statistics
- Matches played: 56
- Attendance: 16,615 (297 per match)

The 2021 Asian Men's Volleyball Championship was the twenty-first staging of the Asian Men's Volleyball Championship, a biennial international volleyball tournament organised by the Asian Volleyball Confederation (AVC) with Japan Volleyball Association (JVA). The tournament was held in Chiba and Funabashi, Japan from 12 to 19 September 2021.

The top two teams of the tournament qualified for the 2022 FIVB Volleyball Men's World Championship as the AVC representatives.

== Host selection ==
On 11 February 2020, the AVC announced that only one national federation have applied two bids to organize 2021 Asian Championship:

- Japan

== Qualification ==
Following the AVC regulations, The maximum of 16 teams in all events will be selected by

- team for the host country
- teams based on the final standing of the previous edition
- teams from each zones (with a qualification tournament if needed)

=== Qualified teams ===
Event(s)		Dates	Location	Berths	Qualifier(s)
Host nation		11 February 2020	N/A	1	Japan
2019 Asian Championship		13 – 21 September 2019	(Iran) Tehran	9^{A}	Iran; Australia; ~~Japan~~; South Korea; Chinese Taipei; China; Pakistan; India; Qatar; Kazakhstan
Direct zonal wildcards	East Asia	No later than 2 February 2021	N/A	1	Hong Kong
Direct zonal wildcards	Southeast Asia	No later than 2 February 2021	N/A	1^{B}	Thailand
Direct zonal wildcards	West Asia	No later than 2 February 2021	N/A	3^{B}	Bahrain; Saudi Arabia; Kuwait
2021 Central Asian Qualifier		14 July 2021	(Sri Lanka) Colombo	1^{C}	~~Sri Lanka~~; Uzbekistan
Total				16	

^A Japan qualified as the hosts, is originally top 10 of previous edition. The spot was reallocated to zonal entrants.
^B Indonesia, the Philippines, and Vietnam also submitted their entry for their participation in the tournament. However they could not be accommodated due to all 16 teams already confirmed at the time; This include the confirmation of the participation of 3 Western Asian teams and the conclusion of the Central Asia qualifier. Thailand was granted the sole Southeast Asian berth, the top ranked Southeast Asian team in the 2019 edition, which has earlier confirmed their participation. No qualification tournament was held.
^C Sri Lanka originally qualified but withdrew due to all of its players and staff testing positive for COVID-19. As a result, Uzbekistan replaced Sri Lanka in August 2021.

=== Zonal qualification ===
Only the Central Asian qualification tournament was held which was contested by Sri Lanka and Uzbekistan at Sugathadasa Indoor Stadium in Colombo, Sri Lanka.

- Time is Sri Lanka Standard Time (UTC+05:30).

Date	Time		Score		Set 1	Set 2	Set 3	Set 4	Set 5	Total	Report
14 Jul	14:30	Sri Lanka	3–0	Uzbekistan	25–23	25–13	25–22			75–58	Report

== Pools composition ==
=== Preliminary round ===
Teams were seeded in the first two positions of each pool following the serpentine system according to their final standing of the 2019 edition. AVC reserved the right to seed the hosts as head of Pool A regardless of the final standing of the 2019 edition. All teams not seeded were drawn in Bangkok, Thailand on 16 July 2021. Final standings of the 2019 edition are shown in brackets except the hosts who ranked 3rd.

Pots

Seeded Teams		Pot 2	Pot 3
Japan (Hosts); Iran (1); Australia (2); South Korea (4)	Chinese Taipei (5); China (6); Pakistan (7); India (8)	Qatar (9); Kazakhstan (10); Thailand (11); Sri Lanka (14)*	Kuwait (15); Hong Kong (16); Bahrain (N/A); Saudi Arabia (N/A)

- Sri Lanka withdrew after the draw due to COVID-19 outbreak among the team, and was replaced by Uzbekistan.

Pool A	Pool B	Pool C	Pool D
Japan (Hosts)	Iran (1)	Australia (2)	South Korea (4)
India (8)	Pakistan (7)	China (6)	Chinese Taipei (5)
Qatar	Thailand	~~Sri Lanka~~; Uzbekistan	Kazakhstan
Bahrain	Hong Kong	Kuwait	Saudi Arabia

=== Classification round ===
Final eight				9th–16th places			
Pool E		Pool F		Pool G		Pool H	
1A	Japan (Hosts)	1B	Iran	3A	Bahrain	3B	Thailand
1C	Australia	1D	Chinese Taipei	3C	Kuwait	3D	Saudi Arabia
2A	Qatar	2B	Pakistan	4A	India	4B	Hong Kong
2C	China	2D	South Korea	4C	Uzbekistan	4D	Kazakhstan

== Venues ==
Preliminary round, Pool E, F, 5th–8th places and Final four	Preliminary round, Pool G, H, 13th–16th places and 9th–12th places
Chiba, Japan	Funabashi, Japan
Chiba Port Arena	Funabashi Arena
Capacity: 7,512	Capacity: 4,368

== Pool standing procedure ==
1. Number of matches won
2. Match points
3. Sets ratio
4. Points ratio
5. If the tie continues as per the point ratio between two teams, the priority will be given to the team which won the last match between them. When the tie in points ratio is between three or more teams, a new classification of these teams in the terms of points 1, 2 and 3 will be made taking into consideration only the matches in which they were opposed to each other.

Match won 3–0 or 3–1: 3 match points for the winner, 0 match points for the loser
Match won 3–2: 2 match points for the winner, 1 match point for the loser

== Preliminary round ==
- All times are Japan Standard Time (UTC+09:00).

=== Pool A ===
Pos	Team	Pld	W	L	Pts	SW	SL	SR	SPW	SPL	SPR	Qualification
1	Japan	3	3	0	9	9	1	9.000	248	193	1.285	Final eight (Pools E and F)
2	Qatar	3	2	1	6	6	3	2.000	215	194	1.108	Final eight (Pools E and F)
3	Bahrain	3	1	2	3	4	6	0.667	221	241	0.917	9th–16th places (Pools G and H)
4	India	3	0	3	0	0	9	0.000	171	227	0.753	9th–16th places (Pools G and H)

Date	Time	Venue		Score		Set 1	Set 2	Set 3	Set 4	Set 5	Total	Report
12 Sep	09:30	CPA	Bahrain	3–0	India	27–25	25–21	25–21			77–67	P2
12 Sep	18:00	CPA	Japan	3–0	Qatar	25–20	25–23	25–21			75–64	P2
13 Sep	12:00	CPA	India	0–3	Qatar	22–25	14–25	20–25			56–75	P2
13 Sep	18:00	CPA	Bahrain	1–3	Japan	25–23	17–25	23–25	16–25		81–98	P2
14 Sep	12:00	CPA	Qatar	3–0	Bahrain	25–19	25–20	26–24			76–63	P2
14 Sep	18:00	CPA	Japan	3–0	India	25–15	25–15	25–18			75–48	P2

=== Pool B ===
Pos	Team	Pld	W	L	Pts	SW	SL	SR	SPW	SPL	SPR	Qualification
1	Iran	3	3	0	9	9	0	MAX	225	150	1.500	Final eight (Pools E and F)
2	Pakistan	3	2	1	5	6	6	1.000	261	248	1.052	Final eight (Pools E and F)
3	Thailand	3	1	2	4	5	7	0.714	251	275	0.913	9th–16th places (Pools G and H)
4	Hong Kong	3	0	3	0	2	9	0.222	206	270	0.763	9th–16th places (Pools G and H)

Date	Time	Venue		Score		Set 1	Set 2	Set 3	Set 4	Set 5	Total	Report
12 Sep	15:00	CPA	Thailand	2–3	Pakistan	25–22	23–25	25–21	23–25	12–15	108–108	P2
12 Sep	15:00	FBA	Iran	3–0	Hong Kong	25–12	25–18	25–19			75–49	P2
13 Sep	09:30	CPA	Hong Kong	1–3	Pakistan	16–25	26–24	11–25	12–25		65–99	P2
13 Sep	15:00	CPA	Iran	3–0	Thailand	25–17	25–12	25–18			75–47	P2
14 Sep	09:30	CPA	Pakistan	0–3	Iran	20–25	19–25	15–25			54–75	P2
14 Sep	15:00	CPA	Thailand	3–1	Hong Kong	25–22	17–25	29–27	25–18		96–92	P2

=== Pool C ===
Pos	Team	Pld	W	L	Pts	SW	SL	SR	SPW	SPL	SPR	Qualification
1	Australia	3	3	0	8	9	2	4.500	263	209	1.258	Final eight (Pools E and F)
2	China	3	2	1	7	8	3	2.667	261	207	1.261	Final eight (Pools E and F)
3	Kuwait	3	1	2	3	3	7	0.429	185	244	0.758	9th–16th places (Pools G and H)
4	Uzbekistan	3	0	3	0	1	9	0.111	196	245	0.800	9th–16th places (Pools G and H)

Date	Time	Venue		Score		Set 1	Set 2	Set 3	Set 4	Set 5	Total	Report
12 Sep	12:30	FBA	Kuwait	0–3	China	12–25	16–25	18–25			46–75	P2
12 Sep	17:30	FBA	Australia	3–0	Uzbekistan	25–16	25–19	25–19			75–54	P2
13 Sep	12:30	FBA	Uzbekistan	0–3	China	14–25	18–25	16–25			48–75	P2
13 Sep	15:00	FBA	Australia	3–0	Kuwait	25–21	25–14	25–9			75–44	P2
14 Sep	10:05	FBA	Kuwait	3–1	Uzbekistan	29–27	16–25	25–21	25–21		95–94	P2
14 Sep	17:40	FBA	China	2–3	Australia	27–25	25–20	21–25	26–28	12–15	111–113	P2

=== Pool D ===
Pos	Team	Pld	W	L	Pts	SW	SL	SR	SPW	SPL	SPR	Qualification
1	Chinese Taipei	3	3	0	9	9	1	9.000	248	196	1.265	Final eight (Pools E and F)
2	South Korea	3	2	1	6	7	3	2.333	237	207	1.145	Final eight (Pools E and F)
3	Saudi Arabia	3	1	2	3	3	6	0.500	178	217	0.820	9th–16th places (Pools G and H)
4	Kazakhstan	3	0	3	0	0	9	0.000	182	225	0.809	9th–16th places (Pools G and H)

Date	Time	Venue		Score		Set 1	Set 2	Set 3	Set 4	Set 5	Total	Report
12 Sep	10:00	FBA	Chinese Taipei	3–0	Kazakhstan	25–20	25–22	25–19			75–61	P2
12 Sep	12:00	CPA	Saudi Arabia	0–3	South Korea	18–25	17–25	20–25			55–75	P2
13 Sep	10:00	FBA	Saudi Arabia	0–3	Chinese Taipei	15–25	16–25	17–25			48–75	P2
13 Sep	17:30	FBA	South Korea	3–0	Kazakhstan	25–21	25–17	25–16			75–54	P2
14 Sep	12:45	FBA	Kazakhstan	0–3	Saudi Arabia	23–25	21–25	23–25			67–75	P2
14 Sep	15:00	FBA	Chinese Taipei	3–1	South Korea	23–25	25–21	25–20	25–21		98–87	P2

== Classification round ==
- All times are Japan Standard Time (UTC+09:00).
- The results and the points of the matches between the same teams that were already played during the preliminary round shall be taken into account for the classification round.

=== Pool E ===
Pos	Team	Pld	W	L	Pts	SW	SL	SR	SPW	SPL	SPR	Qualification
1	Japan	3	2	1	6	7	3	2.333	238	229	1.039	Semifinals
2	China	3	2	1	6	8	6	1.333	328	309	1.061	Semifinals
3	Qatar	3	1	2	4	5	6	0.833	247	251	0.984	5th–8th semifinals
4	Australia	3	1	2	2	3	8	0.375	237	261	0.908	5th–8th semifinals

Date	Time	Venue		Score		Set 1	Set 2	Set 3	Set 4	Set 5	Total	Report
16 Sep	12:20	CPA	Qatar	3–0	Australia	25–20	25–20	25–21			75–61	P2
16 Sep	18:00	CPA	Japan	1–3	China	19–25	29–27	21–25	19–25		88–102	P2
17 Sep	12:00	CPA	Qatar	2–3	China	26–28	25–21	28–26	19–25	10–15	108–115	P2
17 Sep	18:00	CPA	Japan	3–0	Australia	25–23	25–17	25–23			75–63	P2

=== Pool F ===
Pos	Team	Pld	W	L	Pts	SW	SL	SR	SPW	SPL	SPR	Qualification
1	Iran	3	3	0	9	9	0	MAX	225	155	1.452	Semifinals
2	Chinese Taipei	3	2	1	6	6	5	1.200	239	252	0.948	Semifinals
3	Pakistan	3	1	2	3	4	6	0.667	219	231	0.948	5th–8th semifinals
4	South Korea	3	0	3	0	1	9	0.111	203	248	0.819	5th–8th semifinals

Date	Time	Venue		Score		Set 1	Set 2	Set 3	Set 4	Set 5	Total	Report
16 Sep	09:30	CPA	Pakistan	1–3	Chinese Taipei	20–25	25–22	23–25	22–25		90–97	P2
16 Sep	15:00	CPA	Iran	3–0	South Korea	25–19	25–18	25–20			75–57	P2
17 Sep	09:30	CPA	Pakistan	3–0	South Korea	25–23	25–22	25–14			75–59	P2
17 Sep	15:15	CPA	Iran	3–0	Chinese Taipei	25–10	25–23	25–11			75–44	P2

=== Pool G ===
Pos	Team	Pld	W	L	Pts	SW	SL	SR	SPW	SPL	SPR	Qualification
1	Bahrain	3	3	0	9	9	0	MAX	229	189	1.212	9th–12th semifinals
2	India	3	2	1	6	6	3	2.000	217	191	1.136	9th–12th semifinals
3	Kuwait	3	1	2	3	3	7	0.429	214	244	0.877	13th–16th semifinals
4	Uzbekistan	3	0	3	0	1	9	0.111	211	247	0.854	13th–16th semifinals

Date	Time	Venue		Score		Set 1	Set 2	Set 3	Set 4	Set 5	Total	Report
16 Sep	12:30	FBA	India	3–0	Kuwait	25–20	25–20	25–20			75–60	P2
16 Sep	15:00	FBA	Bahrain	3–0	Uzbekistan	25–19	27–25	25–19			77–63	P2
17 Sep	10:00	FBA	India	3–0	Uzbekistan	25–19	25–13	25–22			75–54	P2
17 Sep	17:30	FBA	Bahrain	3–0	Kuwait	25–21	25–19	25–19			75–59	P2

=== Pool H ===
Pos	Team	Pld	W	L	Pts	SW	SL	SR	SPW	SPL	SPR	Qualification
1	Saudi Arabia	3	3	0	9	9	1	9.000	245	202	1.213	9th–12th semifinals
2	Kazakhstan	3	2	1	6	6	4	1.500	235	217	1.083	9th–12th semifinals
3	Thailand	3	1	2	3	5	7	0.714	271	280	0.968	13th–16th semifinals
4	Hong Kong	3	0	3	0	1	9	0.111	194	246	0.789	13th–16th semifinals

Date	Time	Venue		Score		Set 1	Set 2	Set 3	Set 4	Set 5	Total	Report
16 Sep	10:00	FBA	Thailand	1–3	Kazakhstan	25–18	23–25	19–25	22–25		89–93	P2
16 Sep	17:30	FBA	Hong Kong	0–3	Saudi Arabia	12–25	18–25	19–25			49–75	P2
17 Sep	12:30	FBA	Hong Kong	0–3	Kazakhstan	16–25	21–25	16–25			53–75	P2
17 Sep	15:00	FBA	Thailand	1–3	Saudi Arabia	20–25	25–20	19–25	22–25		86–95	P2

== Final round ==
- All times are Japan Standard Time (UTC+09:00).

=== 13th–16th places ===
13th–16th semifinals
18 September
Kuwait	2
Hong Kong	3
18 September
Uzbekistan	3
Thailand	2

13th place match
19 September
Hong Kong	0
Uzbekistan	3
15th place match
19 September
Kuwait	1
Thailand	3

==== 13th–16th semifinals ====
Date	Time	Venue		Score		Set 1	Set 2	Set 3	Set 4	Set 5	Total	Report
18 Sep	10:00	FBA	Uzbekistan	3–2	Thailand	28–26	23–25	25–19	22–25	20–18	118–113	P2
18 Sep	13:00	FBA	Kuwait	2–3	Hong Kong	18–25	25–22	21–25	25–20	14–16	103–108	P2

==== 15th place match ====
Date	Time	Venue		Score		Set 1	Set 2	Set 3	Set 4	Set 5	Total	Report
19 Sep	12:30	FBA	Kuwait	1–3	Thailand	16–25	25–21	23–25	20–25		84–96	P2

==== 13th place match ====
Date	Time	Venue		Score		Set 1	Set 2	Set 3	Set 4	Set 5	Total	Report
19 Sep	10:00	FBA	Hong Kong	0–3	Uzbekistan	20–25	23–25	21–25			64–75	P2

=== 9th–12th places ===
9th–12th semifinals
18 September
Bahrain	3
Kazakhstan	1
18 September
India	3
Saudi Arabia	0

9th place match
19 September
Bahrain	2
India	3
11th place match
19 September
Kazakhstan	3
Saudi Arabia	0

==== 9th–12th semifinals ====
Date	Time	Venue		Score		Set 1	Set 2	Set 3	Set 4	Set 5	Total	Report
18 Sep	15:55	FBA	Bahrain	3–1	Kazakhstan	16–25	25–23	28–26	25–22		94–96	P2
18 Sep	18:30	FBA	India	3–0	Saudi Arabia	25–22	25–22	25–23			75–67	P2

==== 11th place match ====
Date	Time	Venue		Score		Set 1	Set 2	Set 3	Set 4	Set 5	Total	Report
19 Sep	15:00	FBA	Kazakhstan	3–0	Saudi Arabia	25–16	25–20	25–23			75–59	P2

==== 9th place match ====
Date	Time	Venue		Score		Set 1	Set 2	Set 3	Set 4	Set 5	Total	Report
19 Sep	17:30	FBA	Bahrain	2–3	India	16–25	23–25	25–20	25–23	14–16	103–109	P2

=== 5th–8th places ===
5th–8th semifinals
18 September
Qatar	3
South Korea	0
18 September
Australia	3
Pakistan	0

5th place match
19 September
Qatar	3
Australia	0
7th place match
19 September
South Korea	0
Pakistan	3

==== 5th–8th semifinals ====
Date	Time	Venue		Score		Set 1	Set 2	Set 3	Set 4	Set 5	Total	Report
18 Sep	09:30	CPA	Qatar	3–0	South Korea	25–16	32–30	25–22			82–68	P2
18 Sep	12:00	CPA	Australia	3–0	Pakistan	25–16	26–24	25–23			76–63	P2

==== 7th place match ====
Date	Time	Venue		Score		Set 1	Set 2	Set 3	Set 4	Set 5	Total	Report
19 Sep	09:30	CPA	South Korea	0–3	Pakistan	23–25	15–25	26–28			64–78	P2

==== 5th place match ====
Date	Time	Venue		Score		Set 1	Set 2	Set 3	Set 4	Set 5	Total	Report
19 Sep	12:00	CPA	Qatar	3–0	Australia	25–21	25–11	25–23			75–55	P2

=== Final four ===
Semifinals
18 September
Japan	3
Chinese Taipei	1
18 September
China	1
Iran	3

Final
19 September
Japan	0
Iran	3
3rd place match
19 September
Chinese Taipei	0
China	3

==== Semifinals ====
Date	Time	Venue		Score		Set 1	Set 2	Set 3	Set 4	Set 5	Total	Report
18 Sep	15:05	CPA	China	1–3	Iran	22–25	25–17	22–25	17–25		86–92	P2
18 Sep	18:00	CPA	Japan	3–1	Chinese Taipei	25–16	22–25	25–21	25–20		97–82	P2

==== 3rd place match ====
Date	Time	Venue		Score		Set 1	Set 2	Set 3	Set 4	Set 5	Total	Report
19 Sep	15:00	CPA	Chinese Taipei	0–3	China	17–25	16–25	17–25			50–75	P2

==== Final ====
Date	Time	Venue		Score		Set 1	Set 2	Set 3	Set 4	Set 5	Total	Report
19 Sep	18:00	CPA	Japan	0–3	Iran	25–27	22–25	29–31			76–83	P2

== Final standing ==
Rank	Team
1st place, gold medalist(s)	Iran
2nd place, silver medalist(s)	Japan
3rd place, bronze medalist(s)	China
4	Chinese Taipei
5	Qatar
6	Australia
7	Pakistan
8	South Korea
9	India
10	Bahrain
11	Kazakhstan
12	Saudi Arabia
13	Uzbekistan
14	Hong Kong
15	Thailand
16	Kuwait

Qualified for the 2022 World Championship
Qualified for the 2022 World Championship via the FIVB World Ranking

2021 Asian Men's champions

Iran
4th title

14–man roster
Mahdi Jelveh, Milad Ebadipour (c), Reza Abedini, Amir Hossein Toukhteh, Aliasghar Mojarad, Esmaeil Mosafer, Mohammad Reza Hazratpour, Meisam Salehi, Saber Kazemi, Amir Hossein Esfandiar, Ali Ramezani, Javad Karimi, Amin Esmaeilnejad, Abolfazl Gholipour
Head coach
Behrouz Ataei

== Awards ==
- Most valuable player
  Saber Kazemi (IRI)
- Best setter
  Javad Karimi (IRI)
- Best outside spikers
  Milad Ebadipour (IRI)
  Yūki Ishikawa (JPN)
- Best middle blockers
  Aliasghar Mojarad (IRI)
  Li Yongzhen (CHN)
- Best opposite spiker
  Kento Miyaura (JPN)
- Best libero
  Mohammad Reza Hazratpour (IRI)

== See also ==
- 2021 Asian Women's Volleyball Championship
- 2021 Asian Men's Club Volleyball Championship
