= Rezazadeh Stadium =

Sports arena in Ardabil, Iran

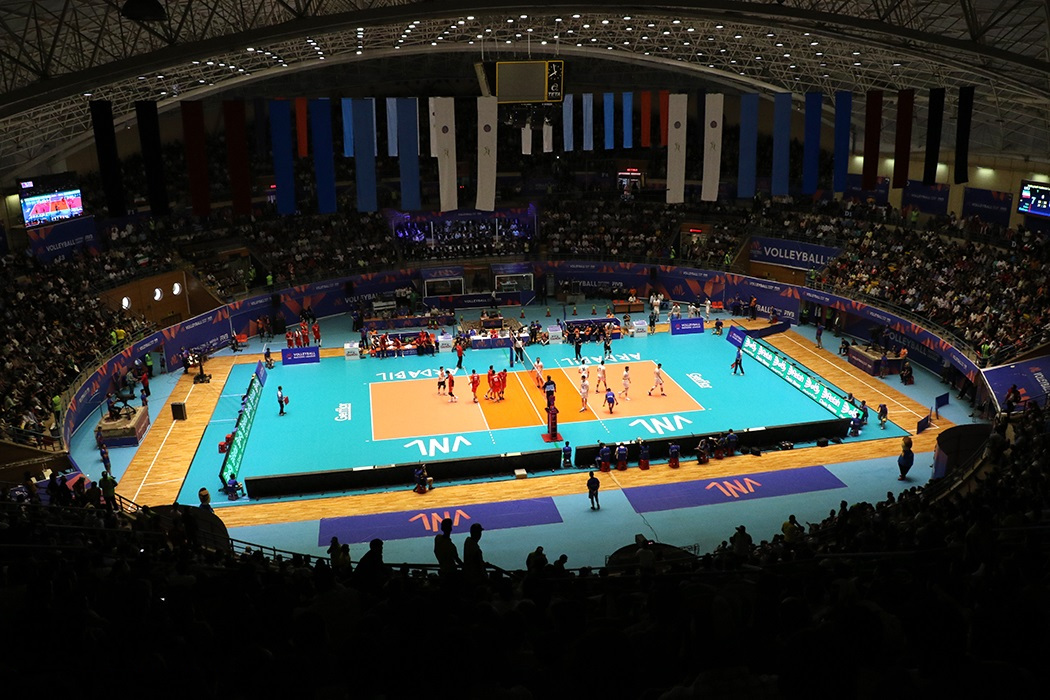
- Interactive map of Rezazadeh Stadium
- Full name: Rezazadeh Stadium
- Location: Ardabil, Iran
- Coordinates: 38.226584°N 48.281136°E
- Owner: Iran Physical Education Organization
- Operator: Iran Physical Education Organization
- Capacity: 6,000
- Acreage: 6,500 m^{2} (70,000 sq ft)

Construction
- Built: 2001–2006
- Opened: 24 April 2007
- Project managers: Khorram-Saz Construction and Consulting
- Main contractors: Khorram-Saz Construction and Consulting

The Rezazadeh Stadium is an all-seater indoor arena located in Ardabil, Iran. It was opened in 2007 and has a capacity of 6,000 people. The stadium is named after Olympic Gold medalist and world record weightlifter Hossein Rezazadeh.

== Hosted events ==
- 2017 Asian Men's U23 Volleyball Championship
- 2018 FIVB Volleyball Men's World Championship AVC Qualification Final Round Pool A
- 2018 World Wrestling Clubs Cup – Men's Greco-Roman
- 2019 FIVB Volleyball Men's Nations League – Preliminary Round

== Gallery ==
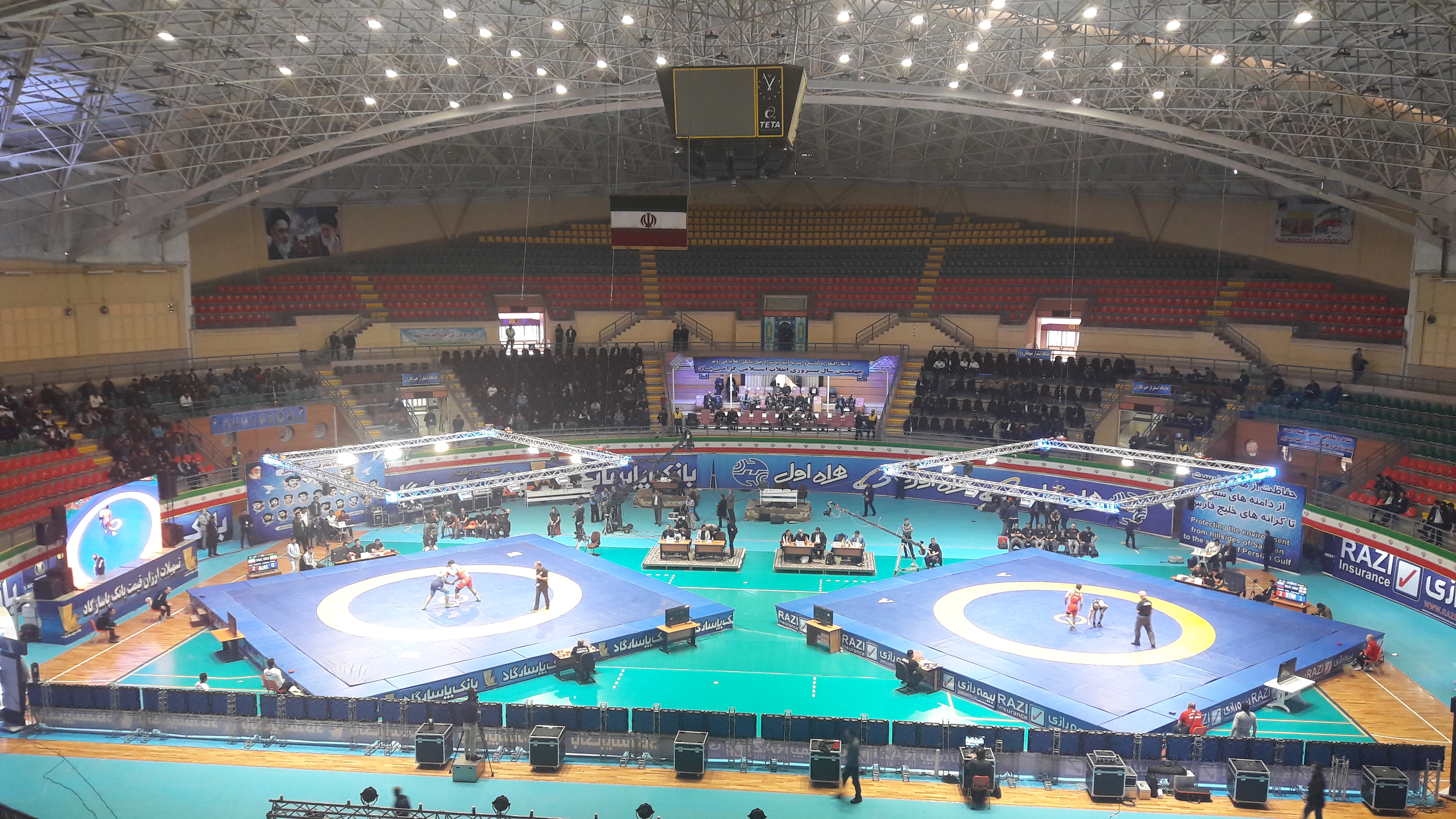
2018 World Wrestling clubs Cup

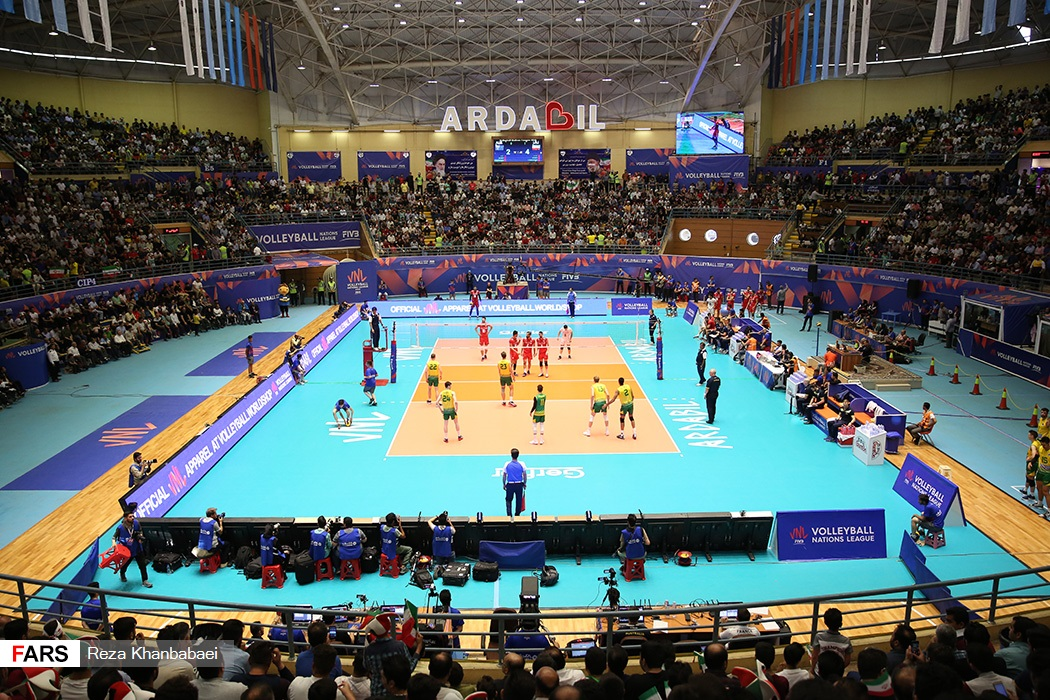
2019 FIVB Volleyball Men's Nations League
