= Volleyball at the 2020 Summer Olympics – Men's Asian qualification =

2020 Men's Asian Olympic Qualification Tournament
Tournament details
- Host country: China
- City: Jiangmen
- Dates: 7–12 January
- Teams: 8 (from 1 confederation)
- Venue: 1 (in 1 host city)

Final positions
- Champions: Iran (2nd title)
- Runners-up: China

Tournament statistics
- Matches played: 15

The Asian Qualification Tournament for the 2020 Men's Olympic Volleyball Tournament was a volleyball tournament for men's national teams held in Jiangmen, China from 7 to 12 January 2020. 8 teams played in the tournament and the winners Iran qualified for the 2020 Summer Olympics (postponed to 2021 due to the COVID-19 pandemic).

== Qualification ==
The top eight teams from the 2019 Asian Championship which had not yet qualified to the 2020 Summer Olympics qualified for the tournament. However, Kazakhstan replaced Pakistan, who withdrew from the tournament. Final standings of the 2019 Asian Championship are shown in brackets.

- Iran (1)
- Australia (2)
- South Korea (4)
- Chinese Taipei (5)
- China (6)
- Pakistan (7) (withdrew)
- India (8)
- Qatar (9)
- Kazakhstan (10) (Replacement)

== Pools composition ==
Teams were seeded following the serpentine system according to their final standing of the 2019 Asian Championship.

Pool A	Pool B
Iran	Australia
Chinese Taipei	South Korea
China	India
Kazakhstan	Qatar

== Venue ==
All matches
Jiangmen, China
Jiangmen Sports Center Gymnasium
Capacity: 8,500
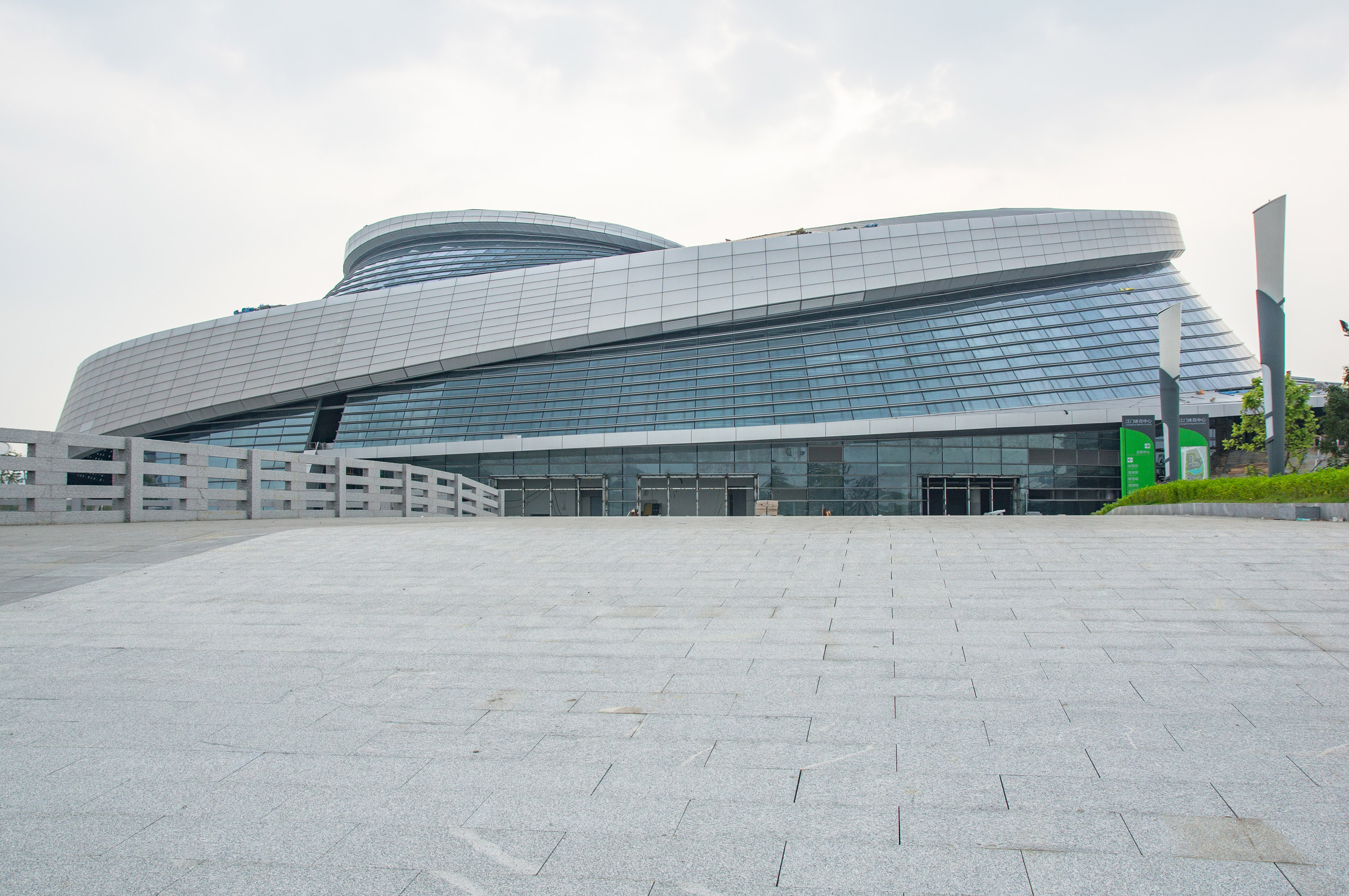

== Pool standing procedure ==
1. Number of matches won
2. Match points
3. Sets ratio
4. Points ratio
5. Result of the last match between the tied teams

Match won 3–0 or 3–1: 3 match points for the winner, 0 match points for the loser
Match won 3–2: 2 match points for the winner, 1 match point for the loser

== Preliminary round ==
- All times are China Standard Time (UTC+08:00).

=== Pool A ===
Pos	Team	Pld	W	L	Pts	SW	SL	SR	SPW	SPL	SPR	Qualification
1	Iran	3	3	0	9	9	0	MAX	228	170	1.341	Semifinals
2	China	3	2	1	5	6	5	1.200	241	223	1.081	Semifinals
3	Chinese Taipei	3	1	2	4	5	7	0.714	238	253	0.941	
4	Kazakhstan	3	0	3	0	1	9	0.111	186	247	0.753	

Date	Time		Score		Set 1	Set 2	Set 3	Set 4	Set 5	Total	Report
7 Jan	17:00	Chinese Taipei	0–3	Iran	16–25	17–25	14–25			47–75	P2
7 Jan	20:00	China	3–0	Kazakhstan	25–19	25–14	25–18			75–51	P2
8 Jan	16:00	Kazakhstan	0–3	Iran	26–28	16–25	18–25			60–78	P2
8 Jan	20:00	China	3–2	Chinese Taipei	15–25	25–16	23–25	25–22	15–9	103–97	P2
9 Jan	16:40	Chinese Taipei	3–1	Kazakhstan	19–25	25–11	25–18	25–21		94–75	P2
9 Jan	20:00	Iran	3–0	China	25–22	25–20	25–21			75–63	P2

=== Pool B ===
Pos	Team	Pld	W	L	Pts	SW	SL	SR	SPW	SPL	SPR	Qualification
1	Qatar	3	2	1	7	8	3	2.667	257	234	1.098	Semifinals
2	South Korea	3	2	1	6	8	5	1.600	299	282	1.060	Semifinals
3	Australia	3	2	1	5	6	6	1.000	272	280	0.971	
4	India	3	0	3	0	1	9	0.111	218	250	0.872	

Date	Time		Score		Set 1	Set 2	Set 3	Set 4	Set 5	Total	Report
7 Jan	10:00	Qatar	3–0	India	25–22	25–20	25–23			75–65	P2
7 Jan	13:30	Australia	3–2	South Korea	23–25	25–23	26–24	20–25	19–17	113–114	P2
8 Jan	10:00	Australia	0–3	Qatar	15–25	21–25	23–25			59–75	P2
8 Jan	13:30	South Korea	3–0	India	25–19	25–20	25–23			75–62	P2
9 Jan	10:00	India	1–3	Australia	27–25	21–25	21–25	22–25		91–100	P2
9 Jan	13:30	Qatar	2–3	South Korea	18–25	26–28	25–22	25–20	13–15	107–110	P2

== Final round ==
- All times are China Standard Time (UTC+08:00).

Semifinals
11 January
Qatar	1
China	3
11 January
Iran	3
South Korea	2

Final
12 January
China	0
Iran	3

=== Semifinals ===
Date	Time		Score		Set 1	Set 2	Set 3	Set 4	Set 5	Total	Report
11 Jan	16:00	Iran	3–2	South Korea	22–25	25–21	25–18	22–25	15–13	109–102	P2
11 Jan	20:00	Qatar	1–3	China	22–25	18–25	25–23	20–25		85–98	P2

=== Final ===
Date	Time		Score		Set 1	Set 2	Set 3	Set 4	Set 5	Total	Report
12 Jan	20:00	China	0–3	Iran	14–25	22–25	14–25			50–75	P2

== Final standing ==
Rank	Team
1	Iran
2	China
3	Qatar
3	South Korea
5	Australia
5	Chinese Taipei
7	India
7	Kazakhstan

Qualified for the 2020 Summer Olympics

== Qualifying team for Summer Olympics ==
Team	Qualified on	Previous appearances in Summer Olympics (Note: Bold indicates champions for that year. Italic indicates hosts for that year.)
Iran	12 January 2020	1 (2016)

== See also ==
- Volleyball at the 2020 Summer Olympics – Women's Asian qualification
