= Esmaeil Mosafer =

Iranian volleyball player (born 1997)

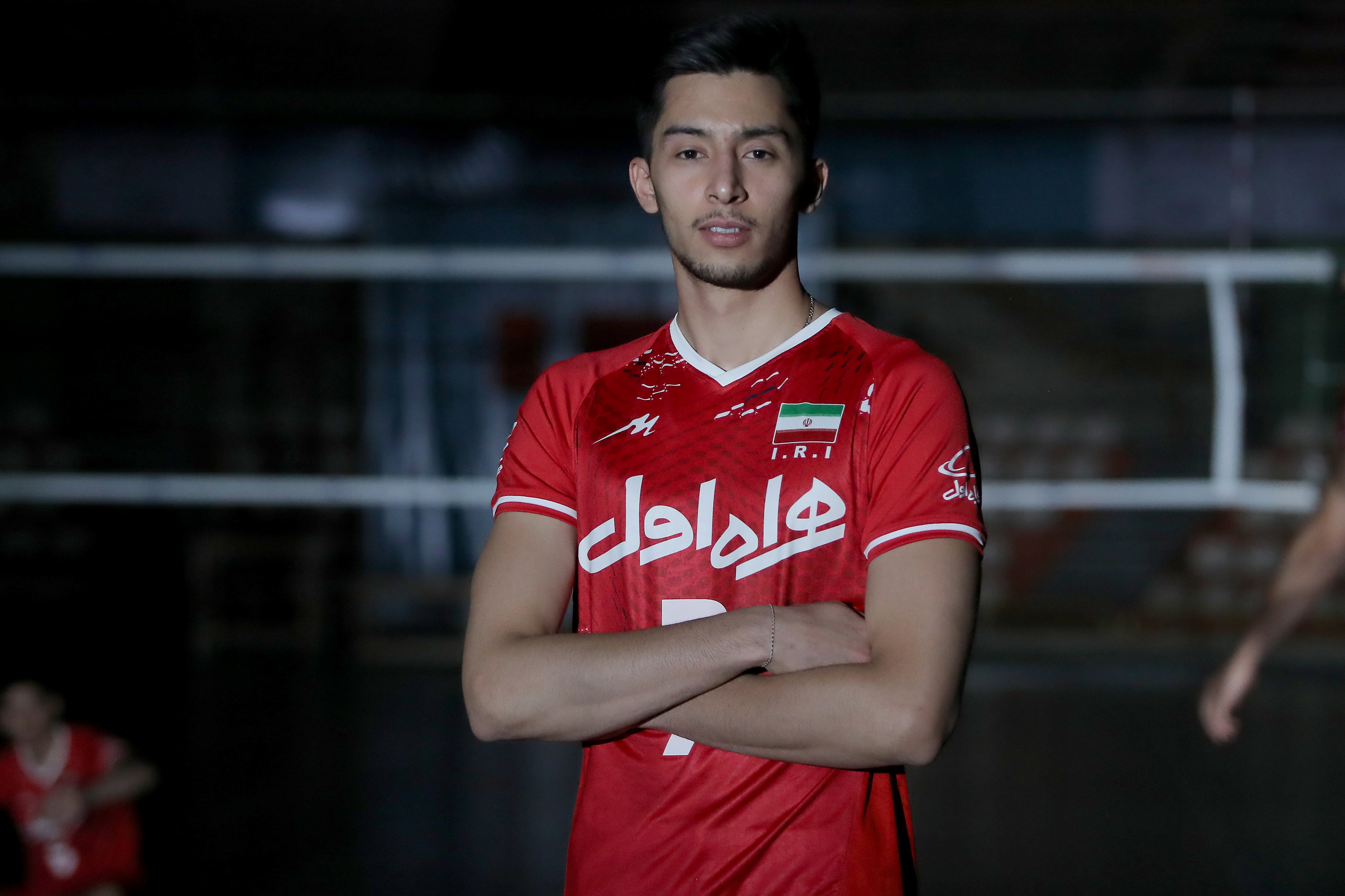

Personal information
- Full name: Esmaeil Mosafer Dashliboroun
- Born: 21 November 1997 (age 28); Gonbad-e Kavus, Iran
- Height: 1.91 m (6 ft 3 in)
- Weight: 75 kg (165 lb)
- Spike: 3.45 m (136 in)
- Block: 3.35 m (132 in)

Volleyball information
- Position: Outside hitter
- Current club: (Iran) Pas Gorgan VC
- Number: 7

Career
Years	Teams
2016–2018; 2019–2020	(Iran) Kalleh Mazandaran (Iran) Paykan Tehran

National team
2015; 2017; 2018–	Iran U19; Iran U23; Iran
Honours
Men's volleyball
Representing Iran
Asian Championship
Gold medal – first place	2021 Japan	Team
Asian Cup
Silver medal – second place	2018 Taipei	Team
Islamic Solidarity Games
Gold medal – first place	2021 Konya	Team

Esmaeil Mosafer (Persian: اسماعیل مسافر, born 21 November 1997, in Gonbad-e Kavus) is an Iranian volleyball player who plays as an Outside hitter for the Iranian national team and Iranian club Paykan Tehran VC and Kalleh Mazandaran VC.

== Honours ==
=== National team ===
- 2021 Asian Men's Volleyball Championship
  - (gold) Gold (1): 2021
- 2018 Asian Men's Volleyball Cup
  - (silver) Silver (1): 2018
- 2017 Asian Men's U23 Volleyball Championship
  - (gold) Gold (1): 2017
- 2016 Asian Men's U20 Volleyball Championship
  - (silver) Silver (1): 2016
- 2015 FIVB Volleyball Boys' U19 World Championship
  - (bronze) Bronze (1): 2015
