= Purya Fayazi =

Iranian volleyball player (born 1993)

Poorya Fayazi
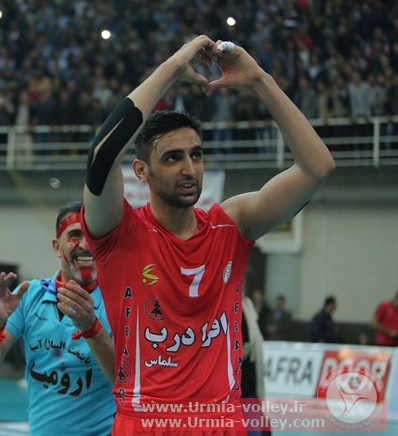
- Fayazi in 2015

Personal information
- Full name: Purya Fayazi Damnabi
- Nationality: (Iran) Iranian
- Born: 12 January 1993 (age 33); Hashtrud, East Azerbaijan, Iran
- Height: 1.94 m (6 ft 4 in)
- Weight: 87 kg (192 lb)
- Spike: 330 cm (130 in)

Volleyball information
- Position: Outside spiker
- Current club: (Iran) paykan tehran
- Number: 7

Career
Years	Teams
2011–2013; 2013–2015; 2015–2016; 2016–2017; 2017–2019; 2019; 2019–	(Iran) Saipa Alborz (Iran) Shahrdari Urmia (Iran) Sarmayeh Bank Tehran (Iran) Parseh Tehran (Iran) Shahrdari Varamin (Poland) MKS Będzin (Iran) Shahrdari Urmia

National team
2011–2021	Iran
Honours
Representing Iran
Men's volleyball
Asian Championship
Gold medal – first place	2019 Tehran
Silver medal – second place	2015 Tehran
Asian Games
Gold medal – first place	2014 Incheon

Purya Fayazi Damnabi (Persian: پوریا فیاضی), (born 12 January 1993 in Tehran) is an Iranian volleyball player who plays as an outside spiker for the Iranian national team and Iranian team Shahrdari Urmia.

== Sporting achievements ==
- AVC Asian Club Championship
  - Philippines 2014 – with Matin Varamin^{1}
  - Chinese Taipei 2019 – with Shahrdari Varamin

^{1} On loan in Matin Varamin

- National championships
  - 2011/2012 Iranian Championship, with Saipa Alborz
  - 2013/2014 Iranian Championship, with Shahrdari Urmia
  - 2014/2015 Iranian Championship, with Shahrdari Urmia
  - 2015/2016 Iranian Championship, with Sarmayeh Bank Tehran
  - 2018/2019 Iranian Championship, with Shahrdari Varamin
  - 2020/2021 Iranian Championship, with Shahrdari Urmia
- National team
  - 2008 AVC Asian U18 Championship
  - 2009 FIVB U19 World Championship
  - 2014 AVC Asian Games
  - 2015 AVC Asian Championship
  - 2015 AVC Asian U23 Championship
  - 2019 AVC Asian Championship

=== Individually ===
- The Best Scorer: 2008 Asian U18 Championship
- The Most Valuable Player: 2015 Asian U23 Championship
- The Best Outside Spiker: 2015 Asian U23 Championship
- The Best Outside Spiker: 2015 Asian Championship
