= Esteban Cichello Hübner =

Argentine philologist and polyglot

- אסטבן צ'יצ'לו היבנר
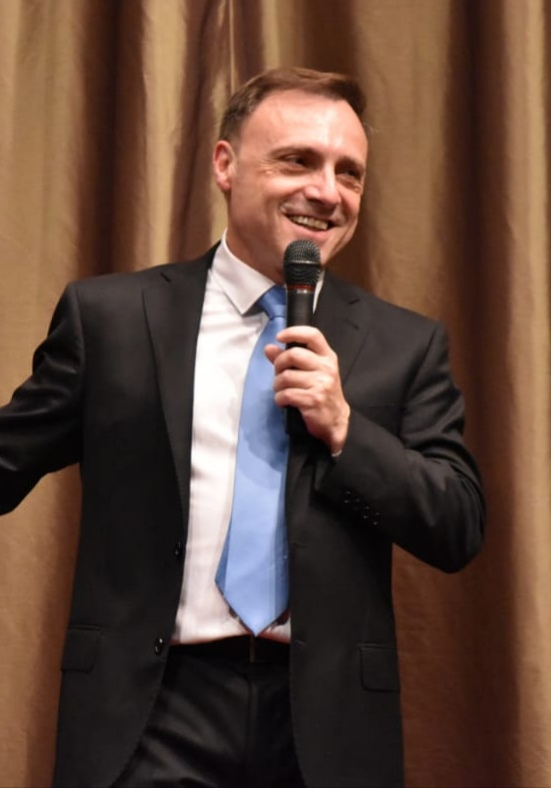
- Education: Hebrew University of Jerusalem; Hertford College, University of Oxford; University of Salamanca
- Occupation: Mentor teacher
- Employer: Oxford University

Esteban Cichello Hübner (Hebrew: אסטבן צ'יצ'לו היבנר) is an Argentine philologist and polyglot. He teaches languages at the University of Oxford and is the author of the book Rachel's Keys.

== Biography ==
Cichello was born in La Falda, Córdoba, and was raised by his mother and grandmother in a shack without electricity or running water in a poor area of the big Buenos Aires. Interested in languages from an early age, Cichello collected copper wires from the rubbish and sold them to save up and buy an English dictionary. Later, he traded eggs with a neighbour for an English course on vinyl records.

At the age of 15, while working as a bellboy at the Hotel El Conquistador, in Buenos Aires, Cichello met and befriended footballer Diego Armando Maradona. Years later, in October 1995, he organized and acted as translator for a lecture that Maradona gave at the Oxford Union. After completing his secondary school education at night school, his interest in traveling was awakened by his geography teacher who suggested that he should get to know his roots. To this end, Cichello moved to Israel, and later the United Kingdom, spending time in several other countries in the intervening years.

In Israel, Cichello worked first at the Kibbutz Kfar Ha-Horesh and later at the Sheraton Hotel in Tel Aviv. It was during this time that Cichello started taking Hebrew lessons. Shortly thereafter he began his studies in International Relations and Political Science at the Hebrew University of Jerusalem, working various jobs to pay for it. In 1991 Cichello joined the entourage that escorted President Menem on his visit to Israel.

After applying to several premier universities, Cichello was accepted to University of Cambridge, Johns Hopkins University, and the University of Oxford. Short on funds, he delayed his studies and went to Japan to work as a bricklayer and then to Paris to work at Eurodisney. The following year, he began his studies at Oxford after convincing the British Council to transfer the Chevening scholarship he had received from Cambridge University to Oxford University. During his time at Oxford, Cichello researched second language acquisition. He was also elected president of the Oxford L'Chaim Society three times.

His focus on clear objectives, the projection method, overcoming difficulties and frustration and continuous learning were the keys to his growth. Cichello lives in Oxford with his partner and their daughter. He teaches spanish at the University of Oxford's Department of Continuing Education.

== Education and professional development ==
Cichello received his BA in International Relations and Political Science from the Hebrew University of Jerusalem. He did his MA in Applied Linguistics and Second Language Acquisition and another degree in Education from Hertford College, University of Oxford; and postgraduate studies in Language, Sociolinguistics and Textual Criticism from the University of Salamanca. He has held several academic positions as a tutor teacher and since 2012 he has been the resident director in various programs at the University of Oxford.

== Academic publications ==
- Cichello Hübner, Esteban. Chevruta Learning: An Exploratory Study of how Chabad Lubavitch Yeshiva Students Learn Languages. 2005. University of Oxford.
- Hübner, Esteban Cichello. Language Learning within the Chevruta. 2012.
