= 2017 Asian Men's U23 Volleyball Championship =

2017 Asian Men's U23 Championship

Tournament details
- Host country: Iran
- Dates: 1–9 May
- Teams: 11
- Venue: 1 (in 1 host city)

Final positions
- Champions: Iran (2nd title)

Tournament awards
- MVP: (Iran) Rahman Taghizadeh

The 2017 Asian Men's U23 Volleyball Championship was the second edition of the Asian Men's U23 Volleyball Championship, a biennial international volleyball tournament organised by the Asian Volleyball Confederation (AVC) with Islamic Republic of Iran Volleyball Federation (IRIVF). It was held in Ardabil, Iran from 1 to 9 May 2017. The tournament was served as the Asian qualifiers for the 2017 FIVB Volleyball Men's U23 World Championship held in Cairo, Egypt with the top two ranked teams qualifying for the world championship.

The matches was played in only one stadium in Ardabil: Rezazadeh Stadium. It was the first time that Iran and Ardabil had hosted the tournament. As hosts, Iran automatically participated for the tournament, while the remaining 10 teams (with the withdrawn of Philippines).

Iran won the tournament with a 3–0 final win over Japan. Both finalists qualified for the World Championship.

== Participated teams ==
Central Asia (CAZA)	East Asia (EAZA)	Oceania (OZA)	Southeast Asia (SEAZA)	West Asia (WAZA)
Iran (host); Kazakhstan; Pakistan; Sri Lanka; Uzbekistan	Chinese Taipei; China; Japan	Australia	Malaysia; ~~Philippines~~; Thailand	

== Pools composition ==
Teams were seeded in the first two positions of each pool following the Serpentine system according to their final standing of the 2015 edition. AVC reserved the right to seed the hosts as head of pool A regardless of the final standing of the 2015 edition. All teams not seeded were drawn in Bangkok, Thailand on 27 February 2017. But, Philippines later withdrew. Final standing of the 2015 edition are shown in brackets except the hosts who ranked 1st.

Pool A	Pool B	Pool C	Pool D
Iran (Hosts)	Chinese Taipei (3)	China (4)	Japan (6)
~~Philippines (14)~~	Kazakhstan (12)	Australia (10)	Thailand (7)
Pakistan (–)	Uzbekistan (–)	Malaysia (–)	Sri Lanka (–)

== Venue ==
All matches
Ardabil, Iran
Rezazadeh Stadium
Capacity: 6,000
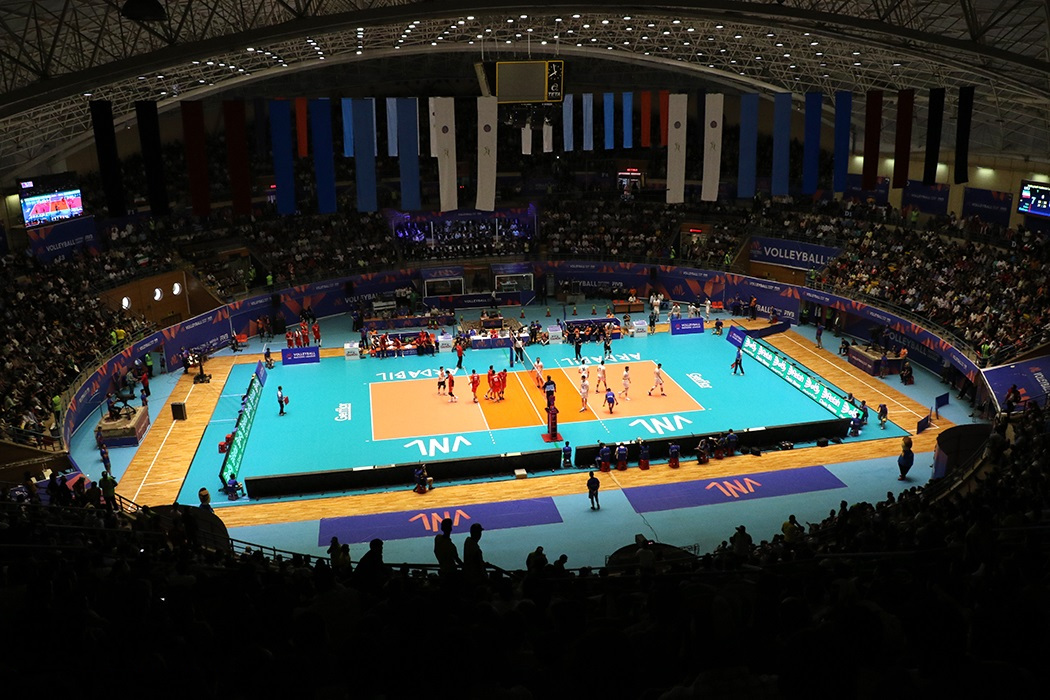

== Pool standing procedure ==
1. Numbers of matches won
2. Match points
3. Sets ratio
4. Points ratio
5. Result of the last match between the tied teams

Match won 3–0 or 2–1: 3 match points for the winner, 0 match points for the loser
Match won 3–2: 2 match points for the winner, 1 match point for the loser

== Preliminary round ==
- All times are Iran Daylight Time (UTC+04:30).

=== Pool A ===
Pos	Team	Pld	W	L	Pts	SW	SL	SR	SPW	SPL	SPR	Qualification
1	Iran	1	1	0	3	3	0	MAX	82	65	1.262	Pool E
2	Pakistan	1	0	1	0	0	3	0.000	65	82	0.793	Pool E

Date	Time		Score		Set 1	Set 2	Set 3	Set 4	Set 5	Total	Report
1 May	17:30	Iran	3–0	Pakistan	25–12	29–27	28–26			82–65	P2

=== Pool B ===
Pos	Team	Pld	W	L	Pts	SW	SL	SR	SPW	SPL	SPR	Qualification
1	Chinese Taipei	2	2	0	5	6	2	3.000	192	158	1.215	Pool F
2	Kazakhstan	2	1	1	2	3	5	0.600	176	176	1.000	Pool F
3	Uzbekistan	2	0	2	2	4	6	0.667	189	223	0.848	Pool H

Date	Time		Score		Set 1	Set 2	Set 3	Set 4	Set 5	Total	Report
1 May	10:00	Uzbekistan	2–3	Kazakhstan	25–20	19–25	16–25	25–22	14–16	99–108	P2
2 May	15:00	Chinese Taipei	3–2	Uzbekistan	25–17	22–25	25–10	28–30	15–8	115–90	P2
3 May	15:00	Kazakhstan	0–3	Chinese Taipei	21–25	25–27	22–25			68–77	P2

=== Pool C ===
Pos	Team	Pld	W	L	Pts	SW	SL	SR	SPW	SPL	SPR	Qualification
1	China	2	2	0	6	6	1	6.000	174	147	1.184	Pool E
2	Malaysia	2	1	1	3	3	4	0.750	157	158	0.994	Pool E
3	Australia	2	0	2	0	2	6	0.333	170	196	0.867	9th place play-offs

Date	Time		Score		Set 1	Set 2	Set 3	Set 4	Set 5	Total	Report
1 May	12:30	Malaysia	3–1	Australia	22–25	25–19	25–17	25–22		97–83	P2
2 May	17:30	China	3–0	Malaysia	25–22	25–19	25–19			75–60	P2
3 May	17:30	Australia	1–3	China	18–25	26–24	21–25	22–25		87–99	P2

=== Pool D ===
Pos	Team	Pld	W	L	Pts	SW	SL	SR	SPW	SPL	SPR	Qualification
1	Japan	2	2	0	5	6	2	3.000	187	149	1.255	Pool F
2	Thailand	2	1	1	4	5	4	1.250	203	195	1.041	Pool F
3	Sri Lanka	2	0	2	0	1	6	0.167	127	173	0.734	Pool H

Date	Time		Score		Set 1	Set 2	Set 3	Set 4	Set 5	Total	Report
1 May	15:00	Japan	3–0	Sri Lanka	25–14	25–17	25–13			75–44	P2
2 May	12:30	Thailand	2–3	Japan	28–30	25–20	19–25	25–22	8–15	105–112	P2
3 May	12:30	Sri Lanka	1–3	Thailand	25–23	21–25	19–25	18–25		83–98	P2

== Second round ==
- All times are Iran Daylight Time (UTC+04:30).
- The results and the points of the matches between the same teams that were already played during the preliminary round shall be taken into account for the classification round.

=== Pool E ===
Pos	Team	Pld	W	L	Pts	SW	SL	SR	SPW	SPL	SPR	Qualification
1	Iran	3	3	0	9	9	1	9.000	255	201	1.269	Final round
2	China	3	2	1	6	6	4	1.500	219	203	1.079	Final round
3	Pakistan	3	1	2	3	4	7	0.571	231	255	0.906	Final round
4	Malaysia	3	0	3	0	2	9	0.222	225	271	0.830	Final round

Date	Time		Score		Set 1	Set 2	Set 3	Set 4	Set 5	Total	Report
4 May	15:00	Iran	3–1	Malaysia	23–25	25–20	25–19	25–21		98–85	P2
4 May	17:30	China	3–1	Pakistan	18–25	25–18	25–11	25–14		93–68	P2
5 May	10:00	Pakistan	3–1	Malaysia	23–25	25–13	25–21	25–21		98–80	P2
5 May	15:00	Iran	3–0	China	25–18	25–15	25–18			75–51	P2

=== Pool F ===
Pos	Team	Pld	W	L	Pts	SW	SL	SR	SPW	SPL	SPR	Qualification
1	Japan	3	3	0	8	9	2	4.500	262	213	1.230	Final round
2	Thailand	3	2	1	6	8	6	1.333	303	298	1.017	Final round
3	Chinese Taipei	3	1	2	4	5	6	0.833	234	249	0.940	Final round
4	Kazakhstan	3	0	3	0	1	9	0.111	205	244	0.840	Final round

Date	Time		Score		Set 1	Set 2	Set 3	Set 4	Set 5	Total	Report
4 May	12:30	Chinese Taipei	2–3	Thailand	25–19	25–22	20–25	18–25	12–15	100–106	P2
4 May	19:30	Japan	3–0	Kazakhstan	25–17	25–17	25–17			75–51	P2
5 May	12:30	Kazakhstan	1–3	Thailand	22–25	17–25	25–17	22–25		86–92	P2
5 May	17:30	Chinese Taipei	0–3	Japan	23–25	18–25	16–25			57–75	P2

=== Pool H ===
Pos	Team	Pld	W	L	Pts	SW	SL	SR	SPW	SPL	SPR	Qualification
1	Sri Lanka	1	1	0	2	3	2	1.500	106	114	0.930	9th place match
2	Uzbekistan	1	0	1	1	2	3	0.667	114	106	1.075	9th place play-offs

Date	Time		Score		Set 1	Set 2	Set 3	Set 4	Set 5	Total	Report
4 May	10:00	Uzbekistan	2–3	Sri Lanka	25–20	25–16	24–26	26–28	14–16	114–106	P2

== Classification round ==
- All times are Iran Daylight Time (UTC+04:30).

=== Bracket ===
Ninth place play-offs
Sri Lanka	Bye
5 May – Ardabil
Australia	0
Uzbekistan	3

Ninth place match
7 May – Ardabil
Sri Lanka	0
Uzbekistan	3
Eleventh place
Australia

=== 9th place play-offs ===
Date	Time		Score		Set 1	Set 2	Set 3	Set 4	Set 5	Total	Report
5 May	19:30	Australia	0–3	Uzbekistan	22–25	19–25	21–25			62–75	P2

=== 9th place match ===
Date	Time		Score		Set 1	Set 2	Set 3	Set 4	Set 5	Total	Report
7 May	10:00	Sri Lanka	0–3	Uzbekistan	23–25	21–25	21–25			65–75	P2

== Final round ==
- All times are Iran Daylight Time (UTC+04:30).

=== Bracket ===
Fifth place
China	3
Pakistan	0
Seventh place
Malaysia	2
Kazakhstan	3

Fifth place play-offs
Malaysia	1
China	3
Kazakhstan	2
Pakistan	3

Quarter-finals
Japan	3
Malaysia	0
China	0
Chinese Taipei	3
Iran	3
Kazakhstan	0
Thailand	3
Pakistan	0

Semi-finals
Japan	3
Chinese Taipei	0
Iran	3
Thailand	0

Final
Japan	0
Iran	3
Third place
Thailand	1
Chinese Taipei	3

=== Quarter-finals ===
Date	Time		Score		Set 1	Set 2	Set 3	Set 4	Set 5	Total	Report
7 May	12:30	Japan	3–0	Malaysia	25–18	25–23	25–23			75–64	P2
7 May	15:00	Thailand	3–0	Pakistan	25–22	25–18	25–17			75–57	P2
7 May	17:30	Iran	3–0	Kazakhstan	25–9	25–17	25–14			75–40	P2
7 May	19:30	China	0–3	Chinese Taipei	19–25	27–29	23–25			69–79	P2

=== 5th place play-offs ===
Date	Time		Score		Set 1	Set 2	Set 3	Set 4	Set 5	Total	Report
8 May	10:00	Malaysia	1–3	China	25–17	22–25	12–25	27–29		86–96	P2
8 May	12:30	Kazakhstan	2–3	Pakistan	20–25	25–17	23–25	25–22	14–16	107–105	P2

=== 7th place match ===
Date	Time		Score		Set 1	Set 2	Set 3	Set 4	Set 5	Total	Report
9 May	10:00	Malaysia	2–3	Kazakhstan	25–22	11–25	23–25	25–20	10–15	94–107	P2

=== 5th place match ===
Date	Time		Score		Set 1	Set 2	Set 3	Set 4	Set 5	Total	Report
9 May	12:30	China	3–0	Pakistan	25–15	25–13	25–13			75–41	P2

=== Semi-finals ===
Date	Time		Score		Set 1	Set 2	Set 3	Set 4	Set 5	Total	Report
8 May	15:00	Japan	3–0	Chinese Taipei	25–21	25–19	25–18			75–58	P2
8 May	17:30	Iran	3–0	Thailand	25–22	25–19	25–20			75–61	P2

=== 3rd place match ===
Date	Time		Score		Set 1	Set 2	Set 3	Set 4	Set 5	Total	Report
9 May	15:00	Thailand	1–3	Chinese Taipei	25–19	21–25	23–25	22–25		91–94	P2

=== Final ===
Date	Time		Score		Set 1	Set 2	Set 3	Set 4	Set 5	Total	Report
9 May	17:30	Japan	0–3	Iran	25–27	24–26	20–25			69–78	P2

== Final standing ==
Rank	Team
1st place, gold medalist(s)	Iran
2nd place, silver medalist(s)	Japan
3rd place, bronze medalist(s)	Chinese Taipei
4	Thailand
5	China
6	Pakistan
7	Kazakhstan
8	Malaysia
9	Uzbekistan
10	Sri Lanka
11	Australia

Qualified for the 2017 U23 World Championship

2017 Asian Men's U23 champions

Iran
2nd title

12–man roster
Mosafer, Hamoudi, Taghizadeh (c), Sheibanimehr, Cheperli, Allahverdian, Esmaeilnejad, Ebrahimi, Javaheri, Karimi, Daliri, Esmaeilpour
Head coach
Cichello

== Awards ==
- Most valuable player
  (Iran) Rahman Taghizadeh
- Best setter
  (Japan) Masaki Oya
- Best outside spikers
  (Japan) Masato Katsuoka
  (Iran) Esmaeil Mosafer
- Best middle blockers
  (Chinese Taipei) Lee Hsing-kuo
  (Iran) Sahand Allahverdian
- Best opposite spiker
  (Iran) Amin Esmaeilnejad
- Best libero
  (Chinese Taipei) Su Hou-chen

== See also ==
- 2017 Asian Women's U23 Volleyball Championship
