= Asian Men's U23 Volleyball Championship =

International youth volleyball competition

- Most recent season or competition: 2019 Asian Men's U23 Volleyball Championship
- Sport: Volleyball
- Founded: 2015
- First season: 2015
- No. of teams: 16 (Finals)
- Continent: Asia and Oceania (AVC)
- Most recent champion: Chinese Taipei (1st title)
- Most titles: Iran (2 titles)
- Broadcaster: SMMTV
- Website: Asian Volleyball Confederation

The Asian Men's U23 Volleyball Championship is an international volleyball competition in Asia and Oceania contested by the under 23 men's national teams of the members of Asian Volleyball Confederation (AVC), the sport's continent governing body. Tournaments have been awarded every two years since 2015.

The current champion is Chinese Taipei, which won its first title at the 2019 tournament.

The 2019 Asian Championship took place in Naypyidaw, Myanmar.

== Results summary ==
Year	Host	Final			Third place match			Teams
Year	Host	Champions	Score	Runners-up	Third-place	Score	Fourth-place	Teams
2015; Details	(Myanmar); Naypyidaw	Iran	3–0	South Korea	Chinese Taipei	3–1	China	16
2017; Details	(Iran); Ardabil	Iran	3–0	Japan	Chinese Taipei	3–1	Thailand	11
2019; Details	(Myanmar); Naypyidaw	Chinese Taipei	3–1	India	Japan	3–0	Pakistan	16

=== Teams reaching the top four ===
Team	Champions	Runners-up	3rd place	4th place
Iran	2 (2015, 2017)			
Chinese Taipei	1 (2019)		2 (2015, 2017)	
Japan		1 (2017)	1 (2019)	
South Korea		1 (2015)		
India		1 (2019)		
China				1 (2015)
Thailand				1 (2017)
Pakistan				1 (2019)

=== Champions by region ===
Federation (Region)	Champion(s)	Number
CAZVA (Central Asia)	Iran (2)	2 titles
EAZVA (East Asia)	Chinese Taipei (1)	1 titles

== Hosts ==
Times Hosted	Nations	Year(s)
2	Myanmar	2015, 2019
1	Iran	2017

== Medal summary ==
Rank	Nation	Gold	Silver	Bronze	Total
1	Iran	2	0	0	2
2	Chinese Taipei	1	0	2	3
3	Japan	0	1	1	2
4	India	0	1	0	1
4	South Korea	0	1	0	1
Totals (5 entries)		3	3	3	9

== Participating nations ==
Team	(Myanmar) 2015 (16)	(Iran) 2017 (11)	(Myanmar) 2019 (16)	Total
Australia	10th	11th	7th	3
Bahrain	•	•	12th	1
China	4th	5th	6th	3
Chinese Taipei	3rd	3rd	1st	3
Hong Kong	•	•	14th	1
India	8th	•	2nd	2
Indonesia	9th	•	•	1
Iran	1st	1st	•	2
Japan	6th	2nd	3rd	3
Kazakhstan	13th	7th	5th	3
Malaysia	•	8th	•	1
Maldives	16th	•	•	1
Myanmar	5th	•	10th	2
New Zealand	•	•	16th	1
Pakistan	•	6th	4th	2
Philippines	14th	•	•	1
Qatar	11th	•	13th	2
Saudi Arabia	12th	•	15th	2
South Korea	2nd	•	•	1
Sri Lanka	•	10th	8th	2
Thailand	7th	4th	11th	3
Uzbekistan	•	9th	•	1
Vietnam	15th	•	9th	2

=== Debut of teams ===
Year	Debutants	Total
2015	Australia	16
2015	China	16
2015	Chinese Taipei	16
2015	India	16
2015	Indonesia	16
2015	Iran	16
2015	Japan	16
2015	Kazakhstan	16
2015	Maldives	16
2015	Myanmar	16
2015	Philippines	16
2015	Qatar	16
2015	Saudi Arabia	16
2015	South Korea	16
2015	Thailand	16
2015	Vietnam	16
2017	Malaysia	4
2017	Pakistan	4
2017	Sri Lanka	4
2017	Uzbekistan	4
2019	Bahrain	3
2019	Hong Kong	3
2019	New Zealand	3

== Awards ==
Year	Most Valuable Player
2015	(Iran) Pouria Fayazi
2017	(Iran) Rahman Taghizadeh
2019	(Chinese Taipei) Chan Minhan

Year	Best Outside Spikers
2015	(Iran) Pouria Fayazi
2015	(Chinese Taipei) Liu Hung-Min
2017	(Japan) Masato Katsuoka
2017	(Iran) Esmaeil Mosafer
2019	(Japan) Arai Yudai
2019	(Pakistan) Ali Usman Faryad

Year	Best Opposite Spiker
2015	(South Korea) Jung Ji-seok
2017	(Iran) Amin Esmaeilnejad
2019	(Chinese Taipei) Chang Yu-Sheng

Year	Best Setter
2015	(Iran) Mostafa Bagheri
2017	(Japan) Masaki Oya
2019	(India) Appavu Muthusamy

Year	Best Middle Blockers
2015	(South Korea) Kim In-hyeok
2015	(Iran) Javad Hosseinabadi
2017	(Chinese Taipei) Lee Hsing-kuo
2017	(Iran) Sahand Allahverdian
2019	(Japan) Murayama Go
2019	(India) Prince

Year	Best Libero
2015	(South Korea) Lee Ji-hun
2017	(Chinese Taipei) Su Hou-chen
2019	(Chinese Taipei) Zhang Yun-Liang

== See also ==
- Asian Women's U23 Volleyball Championship
