= 2019 Asian Men's U23 Volleyball Championship =

2019 Asian Men's U23 Championship
Tournament details
- Host country: Myanmar
- Dates: 3–11 August
- Teams: 16
- Venues: 2 (in 1 host city)

Final positions
- Champions: Chinese Taipei (1st title)

Tournament awards
- MVP: (Chinese Taipei) Chan Min-han

Tournament statistics
- Matches played: 60
- Attendance: 16,870 (281 per match)

The 2019 Asian Men's U23 Volleyball Championship is the third edition of the Asian Men's U23 Volleyball Championship, a biennial international volleyball tournament organised by the Asian Volleyball Confederation (AVC) with Myanmar Volleyball Association. It is held in Naypyitaw, Myanmar from 3 to 11 August 2019.

== Participated teams ==
Southeast Asia (SEAZA)	Central Asia (CAZA)	East Asia (EAZA)	Oceania (OZA)	West Asia (WAZA)
Myanmar (host); Vietnam; Thailand	Kazakhstan; Pakistan; Sri Lanka; India	Chinese Taipei; China; Japan; Hong Kong	Australia; New Zealand	Bahrain; Saudi Arabia; Qatar

== Pools composition ==
Teams were seeded in the first two positions of each pool following the Serpentine system according to their final standing of the 2017 edition. All teams not seeded were drawn. Final standing of the 2017 edition are shown in brackets except the host.

Pool A	Pool B	Pool C	Pool D
Myanmar (Hosts)	Japan (2)	Chinese Taipei (3)	Thailand (4)
Sri Lanka (10)	Kazakhstan (7)	Pakistan (6)	China (5)
Australia (11)	Saudi Arabia (–)	Qatar (–)	India (–)
Hong Kong (–)	Vietnam (–)	Bahrain (–)	New Zealand (–)

== Venues ==
- Wunna Theikdi Sports Complex – Hall B, Naypyidaw, Myanmar – Pool A, B and Final eight
- Wunna Theikdi Sports Complex – Hall C, Naypyidaw, Myanmar – Pool C, D and 9th–16th places

== Pool standing procedure ==
1. Numbers of matches won
2. Match points
3. Sets ratio
4. Points ratio
5. Result of the last match between the tied teams

Match won 3–0 or 2–1: 3 match points for the winner, 0 match points for the loser
Match won 3–2: 2 match points for the winner, 1 match point for the loser

== Preliminary round ==
- All times are Myanmar Daylight Time (UTC+06:00).

=== Pool A ===
Pos	Team	Pld	W	L	Pts	SW	SL	SR	SPW	SPL	SPR	Qualification
1	Australia	3	3	0	8	9	3	3.000	291	236	1.233	Pool E
2	Sri Lanka	3	2	1	6	6	4	1.500	229	224	1.022	Pool E
3	Myanmar	3	1	2	4	6	6	1.000	262	274	0.956	Pool G
4	Hong Kong	3	0	3	0	1	9	0.111	200	248	0.806	Pool G

Date	Time		Score		Set 1	Set 2	Set 3	Set 4	Set 5	Total	Report
3 Aug	11:00	Myanmar	3–0	Hong Kong	25–20	25–22	25–22			75–64	P2
3 Aug	18:30	Australia	3–0	Sri Lanka	29–27	25–17	25–14			79–58	P2
4 Aug	13:30	Sri Lanka	3–1	Myanmar	18–25	28–26	25–19	25–14		96–84	P2
4 Aug	16:00	Hong Kong	1–3	Australia	13–25	25–23	21–25	16–25		75–98	P2
5 Aug	11:00	Sri Lanka	3–0	Hong Kong	25–17	25–22	25–22			75–61	P2
5 AUG	13:30	Myanmar	2–3	Australia	26–24	25–23	17–25	25–27	10–15	103–114	P2

=== Pool B ===
Pos	Team	Pld	W	L	Pts	SW	SL	SR	SPW	SPL	SPR	Qualification
1	Japan	3	3	0	9	9	1	9.000	246	183	1.344	Pool F
2	Kazakhstan	3	2	1	6	7	3	2.333	230	216	1.065	Pool F
3	Vietnam	3	1	2	3	3	6	0.500	191	221	0.864	Pool H
4	Saudi Arabia	3	0	3	0	0	9	0.000	183	230	0.796	Pool H

Date	Time		Score		Set 1	Set 2	Set 3	Set 4	Set 5	Total	Report
3 Aug	11:00	Kazakhstan	3–0	Vietnam	25–22	25–18	25–15			75–55	P2
3 Aug	16:00	Saudi Arabia	0–3	Japan	19–25	10–25	18–25			47–75	P2
4 Aug	11:00	Vietnam	3–0	Saudi Arabia	30–28	25–21	25–22			80–71	P2
4 Aug	18:30	Japan	3–1	Kazakhstan	25–15	21–25	25–18	25–22		96–80	P2
5 Aug	16:00	Japan	3–0	Vietnam	25–19	25–22	25–15			75–56	P2
5 AUG	18:30	Kazakhstan	3–0	Saudi Arabia	25–20	25–23	25–22			75–65	P2

=== Pool C ===
Pos	Team	Pld	W	L	Pts	SW	SL	SR	SPW	SPL	SPR	Qualification
1	Pakistan	3	3	0	9	9	1	9.000	245	189	1.296	Pool E
2	Chinese Taipei	3	2	1	6	7	3	2.333	228	203	1.123	Pool E
3	Bahrain	3	1	2	3	3	6	0.500	194	208	0.933	Pool G
4	Qatar	3	0	3	0	0	9	0.000	158	225	0.702	Pool G

Date	Time		Score		Set 1	Set 2	Set 3	Set 4	Set 5	Total	Report
3 Aug	16:00	Qatar	0–3	Pakistan	22–25	11–25	21–25			54–75	P2
3 Aug	13:30	Bahrain	0–3	Chinese Taipei	20–25	19–25	23–25			62–75	P2
4 Aug	11:00	Pakistan	3–0	Bahrain	25–21	25–21	25–15			75–57	P2
4 Aug	18:30	Chinese Taipei	3–0	Qatar	25–14	25–20	25–12			75–46	P2
5 Aug	18:30	Qatar	0–3	Bahrain	22–25	13–25	23–25			58–75	P2
5 AUG	13:30	Chinese Taipei	1–3	Pakistan	25–20	18–25	18–25	17–25		78–95	P2

=== Pool D ===
Pos	Team	Pld	W	L	Pts	SW	SL	SR	SPW	SPL	SPR	Qualification
1	India	3	2	1	6	8	5	1.600	299	250	1.196	Pool F
2	China	3	2	1	6	8	5	1.600	292	257	1.136	Pool F
3	Thailand	3	2	1	6	8	6	1.333	303	287	1.056	Pool H
4	New Zealand	3	0	3	0	1	9	0.111	147	247	0.595	Pool H

Date	Time		Score		Set 1	Set 2	Set 3	Set 4	Set 5	Total	Report
3 Aug	13:30	New Zealand	1–3	Thailand	25–22	17–25	17–25	10–25		69–97	P2
3 Aug	18:30	China	2–3	India	25–22	27–29	17–25	27–25	11–15	107–116	P2
4 Aug	16:00	Thailand	2–3	China	23–25	25–22	25–21	19–25	15–17	107–110	P2
4 Aug	13:30	India	3–0	New Zealand	25–18	25–14	25–12			75–44	P2
5 Aug	16:00	Thailand	3–2	India	15–25	25–23	25–22	19–25	15–13	99–108	P2
5 AUG	11:00	China	3–0	New Zealand	25–13	25–11	25–10			75–34	P2

== Second round ==
- All times are Myanmar Daylight Time (UTC+06:00).
- The results and the points of the matches between the same teams that were already played during the preliminary round shall be taken into account for the classification round.

=== Pool E ===
Pos	Team	Pld	W	L	Pts	SW	SL	SR	SPW	SPL	SPR	Qualification
1	Pakistan	3	3	0	9	9	2	4.500	275	239	1.151	Quarterfinals
2	Chinese Taipei	3	2	1	6	7	3	2.333	243	241	1.008	Quarterfinals
3	Australia	3	1	2	3	3	6	0.500	225	225	1.000	Quarterfinals
4	Sri Lanka	3	0	3	0	1	9	0.111	219	257	0.852	Quarterfinals

Date	Time		Score		Set 1	Set 2	Set 3	Set 4	Set 5	Total	Report
7 Aug	11:00	Australia	0–3	Chinese Taipei	36–38	23–25	16–25			75–88	P2
7 AUG	16:00	Pakistan	3–1	Sri Lanka	25–17	25–20	21–25	30–28		101–90	P2
8 Aug	11:00	Sri Lanka	0–3	Chinese Taipei	24–26	23–25	24–26			71–77	P2
8 Aug	13:30	Australia	0–3	Pakistan	27–29	23–25	21–25			71–79	P2

=== Pool F ===
Pos	Team	Pld	W	L	Pts	SW	SL	SR	SPW	SPL	SPR	Qualification
1	Japan	3	3	0	8	9	4	2.250	298	269	1.108	Quarterfinals
2	India	3	2	1	6	8	5	1.600	294	268	1.097	Quarterfinals
3	China	3	1	2	4	6	7	0.857	288	292	0.986	Quarterfinals
4	Kazakhstan	3	0	3	0	2	9	0.222	215	266	0.808	Quarterfinals

Date	Time		Score		Set 1	Set 2	Set 3	Set 4	Set 5	Total	Report
7 Aug	13:30	Japan	3–1	China	25–20	24–26	25–21	25–19		99–86	P2
7 AUG	18:30	India	3–0	Kazakhstan	25–21	25–17	25–20			75–58	P2
8 Aug	16:00	Kazakhstan	1–3	China	24–26	18–25	25–19	10–25		77–95	P2
8 Aug	18:30	Japan	3–2	India	20–25	25–18	25–23	18–25	15–12	103–103	P2

=== Pool G ===
Pos	Team	Pld	W	L	Pts	SW	SL	SR	SPW	SPL	SPR	Qualification
1	Bahrain	3	3	0	9	9	1	9.000	248	200	1.240	9th-12th places match
2	Myanmar	3	2	1	6	6	4	1.500	235	222	1.059	9th-12th places match
3	Qatar	3	1	2	3	4	7	0.571	241	251	0.960	13th-16th places match
4	Hong Kong	3	0	3	0	2	9	0.222	222	273	0.813	13th-16th places match

Date	Time		Score		Set 1	Set 2	Set 3	Set 4	Set 5	Total	Report
7 Aug	18:30	Myanmar	3–1	Qatar	20–25	25–18	25–19	25–21		95–83	P2
7 AUG	11:00	Bahrain	3–1	Hong Kong	25–16	25–19	23–25	25–17		98–77	P2
8 Aug	18:30	Hong Kong	1–3	Qatar	13–25	18–25	25–23	25–27		81–100	P2
8 Aug	13:30	Myanmar	0–3	Bahrain	21–25	22–25	22–25			65–75	P2

=== Pool H ===
Pos	Team	Pld	W	L	Pts	SW	SL	SR	SPW	SPL	SPR	Qualification
1	Thailand	3	3	0	9	9	3	3.000	291	229	1.271	9th-12th places match
2	Vietnam	3	2	1	6	7	4	1.750	262	254	1.031	9th-12th places match
3	Saudi Arabia	3	1	2	3	4	6	0.667	219	236	0.928	13th-16th places match
4	New Zealand	3	0	3	0	2	9	0.222	214	267	0.801	13th-16th places match

Date	Time		Score		Set 1	Set 2	Set 3	Set 4	Set 5	Total	Report
7 Aug	13:30	Vietnam	3–1	New Zealand	25–19	20–25	25–21	25–21		95–86	P2
7 AUG	16:00	Thailand	3–1	Saudi Arabia	25–16	22–25	25–22	25–10		97–73	P2
8 Aug	11:00	Saudi Arabia	3–0	New Zealand	25–22	25–20	25–17			75–59	P2
8 Aug	16:00	Vietnam	1–3	Thailand	20–25	25–22	19–25	23–25		87–97	P2

== Classification round ==
- All times are Myanmar Daylight Time (UTC+06:00).

=== Bracket ===
Thirteenth place play-offs
9 Aug
Qatar	3
New Zealand	1
9 Aug
Saudi Arabia	1
Hong Kong	3

Thirteenth place match
10 Aug
Qatar	3
Hong Kong	1
Fifteenth place match
10 Aug
New Zealand	0
Saudi Arabia	3

=== 13th place play-offs ===
Date	Time		Score		Set 1	Set 2	Set 3	Set 4	Set 5	Total	Report
9 Aug	13:30	Qatar	3–1	New Zealand	22–25	25–20	26–24	25–13		98–82	P2
9 Aug	16:00	Saudi Arabia	1–3	Hong Kong	25–18	25–27	26–28	19–25		95–98	P2

=== 15th place match ===
Date	Time		Score		Set 1	Set 2	Set 3	Set 4	Set 5	Total	Report
10 Aug	11:00	New Zealand	0–3	Saudi Arabia	14–25	20–25	20–25			54–75	P2

=== 13th place match ===
Date	Time		Score		Set 1	Set 2	Set 3	Set 4	Set 5	Total	Report
10 Aug	13:30	Qatar	3–1	Hong Kong	25–16	24–26	25–22	25–20		99–84	P2

=== Bracket ===
Ninth place play-offs
9 Aug
Bahrain	0
Vietnam	3
9 Aug
Thailand	0
Myanmar	3

Ninth place match
10 Aug
Vietnam	3
Myanmar	0
Eleventh place match
10 Aug
Bahrain	0
Thailand	3

=== 9th place play-offs ===
Date	Time		Score		Set 1	Set 2	Set 3	Set 4	Set 5	Total	Report
9 Aug	11:00	Bahrain	0–3	Vietnam	18–25	19–25	14–25			51–75	P2
9 Aug	18:30	Thailand	0–3	Myanmar	20–25	23–25	18–25			61–75	P2

=== 11th place match ===
Date	Time		Score		Set 1	Set 2	Set 3	Set 4	Set 5	Total	Report
10 Aug	16:00	Bahrain	0–3	Thailand	23–25	21–25	24–26			68–76	P2

=== 9th place match ===
Date	Time		Score		Set 1	Set 2	Set 3	Set 4	Set 5	Total	Report
10 Aug	18:30	Vietnam	3–0	Myanmar	27–25	25–23	25–21			77–69	P2

== Final round ==
- All times are Myanmar Daylight Time (UTC+06:00).

=== Bracket ===
Fifth place
China	2
Kazakhstan	3
Seventh place
Sri Lanka	0
Australia	3

Fifth place play-offs
Sri Lanka	1
China	3
Kazakhstan	3
Australia	1

Quarter-finals
Chinese Taipei	3
China	1
Japan	3
Sri Lanka	0
Pakistan	3
Kazakhstan	0
India	3
Australia	1

Semi-finals
Japan	2
Chinese Taipei	3
Pakistan	1
India	3

Final
Chinese Taipei	3
India	1
Third place
Japan	3
Pakistan	0

=== Quarter-finals ===
Date	Time		Score		Set 1	Set 2	Set 3	Set 4	Set 5	Total	Report
9 Aug	11:00	Pakistan	3–1	Kazakhstan	25–21	25–18	17–25	25–21		92–85	P2
9 Aug	13:30	Japan	3–0	Sri Lanka	25–21	25–16	25–14			75–51	P2
9 Aug	16:00	Chinese Taipei	3–0	China	26–24	25–19	25–20			76–63	P2
9 Aug	18:30	India	3–1	Australia	16–25	25–19	25–21	27–25		93–90	P2

=== 5th place play-offs ===
Date	Time		Score		Set 1	Set 2	Set 3	Set 4	Set 5	Total	Report
10 Aug	11:00	Sri Lanka	1–3	China	23–25	21–25	25–23	23–25		92–98	P2
10 Aug	13:30	Kazakhstan	3–1	Australia	25–22	14–25	25–23	25–22		89–92	P2

=== 7th place match ===
Date	Time		Score		Set 1	Set 2	Set 3	Set 4	Set 5	Total	Report
11 Aug	11:00	Sri Lanka	0–3	Australia	24–26	16–25	18–25			58–76	P2

=== 5th place match ===
Date	Time		Score		Set 1	Set 2	Set 3	Set 4	Set 5	Total	Report
11 Aug	13:30	China	2–3	Kazakhstan	22–25	25–14	25–17	22–25	11–15	105–96	P2

=== Semi-finals ===
Date	Time		Score		Set 1	Set 2	Set 3	Set 4	Set 5	Total	Report
10 Aug	16:00	Japan	2–3	Chinese Taipei	20–25	17–25	25–16	25–15	17–19	104–100	P2
10 Aug	18:30	Pakistan	1–3	India	25–21	16–25	22–25	18–25		81–96	P2

=== 3rd place match ===
Date	Time		Score		Set 1	Set 2	Set 3	Set 4	Set 5	Total	Report
11 Aug	16:00	Japan	3–0	Pakistan	25–18	25–23	25–18			75–59	P2

=== Final ===
Date	Time		Score		Set 1	Set 2	Set 3	Set 4	Set 5	Total	Report
11 Aug	18:30	Chinese Taipei	3–1	India	25–21	25–20	19–25	25–23		94–89	P2

== Final standing ==
Rank	Team
1st place, gold medalist(s)	Chinese Taipei
2nd place, silver medalist(s)	India
3rd place, bronze medalist(s)	Japan
4	Pakistan
5	Kazakhstan
6	China
7	Australia
8	Sri Lanka
9	Vietnam
10	Myanmar
11	Thailand
12	Bahrain
13	Qatar
14	Hong Kong
15	Saudi Arabia
16	New Zealand

2019 Asian Men's U23 champions

Chinese Taipei
1st title

12–man roster
Chou Chien-hung, Jhang Yun-liang, Liu Chia-chang, Chen Cheng-chi, Chan Min-han (c), Huang Cheng-hao, Lin Yi-huei, Chang Yu-sheng, Sung Po-ting, Yen Chen-fu, Ko Kai-jie, Lin Yu-cheng
Head coach
(Serbia) Moro Branislav

== Awards ==
- Most Valuable Player
  (Chinese Taipei) Chan Min-han
- Best setter
  (India) Appavu Muyhudsmy
- Best outside spikers
  (Pakistan) Ali Usman Faryad
  (Japan) Arai Yudai
- Best middle blockers
  (Japan) Murayama Go
  (India) Prince
- Best opposite spiker
  (Chinese Taipei) Chang Yu-sheng
- Best libero
  (Chinese Taipei) Jhang Yun-liang

== See also ==
- 2019 Asian Women's U23 Volleyball Championship
