= 2019 Asian Men's Volleyball Championship =

International volleyball tournament

Tournament details
- Host country: Iran
- City: Tehran
- Dates: 13–21 September
- Teams: 16 (from 1 confederation)
- Venue: 2 (in 1 host city)

Final positions
- Champions: Iran (3rd title)
- Runners-up: Australia
- Third place: Japan
- Fourth place: South Korea

Tournament awards
- MVP: (Australia) Thomas Edgar

Tournament statistics
- Matches played: 60
- Attendance: 47,030 (784 per match)

The 2019 Asian Men's Volleyball Championship was the twentieth staging of the Asian Men's Volleyball Championship, a biennial international volleyball tournament organised by the Asian Volleyball Confederation (AVC) with Islamic Republic of Iran Volleyball Federation (IRIVF). The tournament was held in Tehran, Iran from 13 to 21 September 2019.

Top eight teams which had not yet qualified to the 2020 Summer Olympics qualified for the 2020 Asian Olympic Qualification Tournament.

== Qualification ==
Following the AVC regulations, The maximum of 16 teams in all AVC events will be selected by

- 1 team for the host country
- 10 teams based on the final standing of the previous edition
- 5 teams from each of 5 zones (with a qualification tournament if needed)

=== Qualified teams ===
Means of qualification	Date	Venue	Vacancies	Qualified
Host country	—N/a	—N/a	1	Iran^{A}
2017 Asian Championship	24 July–1 August 2017	(Indonesia) Gresik	~~10~~ 8	Japan; Kazakhstan; South Korea; Indonesia; China; Chinese Taipei; Australia; Qatar; ~~Vietnam~~^{B}
Eastern Asia Representatives	—N/a	—N/a	1	Hong Kong
Central Asia Representatives	Cancelled		1+2	Sri Lanka^{C} India^{C} Pakistan^{D}
Southeast Asian Representative	—N/a	—N/a	1	Thailand
Western Asia Qualifier	17–21 July 2019	(Oman) Muscat	1+1	Kuwait; Oman
Oceania Representative	—N/a	—N/a	~~1~~ 0	—N/a
Total			16	

^A Iran qualified as hosts, is originally top 10 of previous edition. The spot was reallocated to the next highest ranked nation, Thailand.
^B Vietnam originally qualified, but declined to enter.
^C Turkmenistan was to play India and Sri Lanka in the Central Asia qualification tournament. However, Turkmenistan was barred from playing due to violating competition regulations prior to tournament. Both India and Sri Lanka qualified.
^D Pakistan were granted entry and was not among the three teams originally set to participate in the cancelled Central Asia qualifiers.

== Pools composition ==
=== Preliminary round ===
Teams were seeded in the first two positions of each pool following the serpentine system according to their final standing of the 2017 edition. AVC reserved the right to seed the hosts as head of Pool A regardless of the final standing of the 2017 edition. All teams not seeded were drawn in Bangkok, Thailand on 19 February 2019. Final standings of the 2017 edition are shown in brackets except the hosts who ranked 5th.

Seeded Teams
Pool A	Pool B	Pool C	Pool D
Iran (Hosts); Australia (8)	Japan (1); Chinese Taipei (7)	Kazakhstan (2); China (6)	South Korea (3); Indonesia (4)
Unseeded Teams
Qatar (9); Thailand (11) Pakistan (12); Sri Lanka (14) Hong Kong (16); India Kuwait; Oman

Draw

Pool A	Pool B	Pool C	Pool D
Iran	Japan	Kazakhstan	South Korea
Australia	Chinese Taipei	China	Indonesia
Qatar	Thailand	Oman	Kuwait
Sri Lanka	Hong Kong	India	Pakistan

=== Classification round ===
Final eight				9th–16th places			
Pool E		Pool F		Pool G		Pool H	
1A	Australia	1B	Japan	3A	Qatar	3B	Thailand
1C	China	1D	South Korea	3C	Kazakhstan	3D	Indonesia
2A	Iran	2B	Chinese Taipei	4A	Sri Lanka	4B	Hong Kong
2C	India	2D	Pakistan	4C	Oman	4D	Kuwait

== Venues ==
Preliminary, Classification round and Final eight	Preliminary, Classification round, 13th–16th places and 9th–12th places
Tehran, Iran
Azadi Indoor Stadium	Azadi Volleyball Hall
Capacity: 12,000	Capacity: 3,000

== Pool standing procedure ==
1. Number of matches won
2. Match points
3. Sets ratio
4. Points ratio
5. If the tie continues as per the point ratio between two teams, the priority will be given to the team which won the last match between them. When the tie in points ratio is between three or more teams, a new classification of these teams in the terms of points 1, 2 and 3 will be made taking into consideration only the matches in which they were opposed to each other.

Match won 3–0 or 3–1: 3 match points for the winner, 0 match points for the loser
Match won 3–2: 2 match points for the winner, 1 match point for the loser

== Preliminary round ==
- All times are Iran Daylight Time (UTC+04:30).

=== Pool A ===
Pos	Team	Pld	W	L	Pts	SW	SL	SR	SPW	SPL	SPR	Qualification
1	Australia	3	3	0	8	9	3	3.000	285	252	1.131	Final eight (Pools E and F)
2	Iran	3	2	1	6	7	3	2.333	240	202	1.188	Final eight (Pools E and F)
3	Qatar	3	1	2	4	5	6	0.833	229	231	0.991	9th–16th places (Pools G and H)
4	Sri Lanka	3	0	3	0	0	9	0.000	163	232	0.703	9th–16th places (Pools G and H)

Date	Time	Venue		Score		Set 1	Set 2	Set 3	Set 4	Set 5	Total	Report
13 Sep	13:30	AIS	Australia	3–2	Qatar	25–23	25–21	23–25	18–25	15–10	106–104	P2
13 Sep	18:30	AIS	Iran	3–0	Sri Lanka	25–15	25–17	25–23			75–55	P2
14 Sep	18:30	AIS	Qatar	0–3	Iran	18–25	15–25	17–25			50–75	P2
14 Sep	18:55	AVH	Sri Lanka	0–3	Australia	15–25	30–32	13–25			58–82	P2
15 Sep	13:30	AIS	Qatar	3–0	Sri Lanka	25–21	25–14	25–15			75–50	P2
15 Sep	18:30	AIS	Iran	1–3	Australia	25–22	23–25	21–25	21–25		90–97	P2

=== Pool B ===
Pos	Team	Pld	W	L	Pts	SW	SL	SR	SPW	SPL	SPR	Qualification
1	Japan	3	3	0	9	9	1	9.000	249	179	1.391	Final eight (Pools E and F)
2	Chinese Taipei	3	2	1	6	7	4	1.750	253	215	1.177	Final eight (Pools E and F)
3	Thailand	3	1	2	3	4	7	0.571	227	252	0.901	9th–16th places (Pools G and H)
4	Hong Kong	3	0	3	0	1	9	0.111	164	247	0.664	9th–16th places (Pools G and H)

Date	Time	Venue		Score		Set 1	Set 2	Set 3	Set 4	Set 5	Total	Report
13 Sep	10:30	AIS	Hong Kong	0–3	Japan	21–25	15–25	11–25			47–75	P2
13 Sep	16:00	AIS	Thailand	1–3	Chinese Taipei	16–25	25–23	16–25	21–25		78–98	P2
14 Sep	10:30	AIS	Chinese Taipei	3–0	Hong Kong	25–11	25–10	25–17			75–38	P2
14 Sep	13:30	AIS	Japan	3–0	Thailand	25–19	25–20	25–13			75–52	P2
15 Sep	16:00	AIS	Hong Kong	1–3	Thailand	25–22	13–25	20–25	21–25		79–97	P2
15 Sep	16:00	AVH	Chinese Taipei	1–3	Japan	15–25	18–25	26–24	21–25		80–99	P2

=== Pool C ===
Pos	Team	Pld	W	L	Pts	SW	SL	SR	SPW	SPL	SPR	Qualification
1	China	3	3	0	9	9	1	9.000	247	190	1.300	Final eight (Pools E and F)
2	India	3	2	1	5	6	6	1.000	266	259	1.027	Final eight (Pools E and F)
3	Kazakhstan	3	1	2	4	5	6	0.833	247	255	0.969	9th–16th places (Pools G and H)
4	Oman	3	0	3	0	2	9	0.222	216	272	0.794	9th–16th places (Pools G and H)

Date	Time	Venue		Score		Set 1	Set 2	Set 3	Set 4	Set 5	Total	Report
13 Sep	13:30	AVH	China	3–1	Oman	25–17	22–25	25–18	25–16		97–76	P2
13 Sep	16:00	AVH	Kazakhstan	2–3	India	29–31	14–25	30–28	25–18	9–15	107–117	P2
14 Sep	10:30	AVH	Oman	0–3	Kazakhstan	21–25	26–28	16–25			63–78	P2
14 Sep	13:30	AVH	India	0–3	China	16–25	15–25	21–25			52–75	P2
15 Sep	13:30	AVH	India	3–1	Oman	22–25	25–12	25–21	25–19		97–77	P2
15 Sep	18:40	AVH	China	3–0	Kazakhstan	25–23	25–19	25–20			75–62	P2

=== Pool D ===
Pos	Team	Pld	W	L	Pts	SW	SL	SR	SPW	SPL	SPR	Qualification
1	South Korea	3	3	0	9	9	0	MAX	225	167	1.347	Final eight (Pools E and F)
2	Pakistan	3	2	1	5	6	6	1.000	265	264	1.004	Final eight (Pools E and F)
3	Indonesia	3	1	2	4	5	7	0.714	265	260	1.019	9th–16th places (Pools G and H)
4	Kuwait	3	0	3	0	2	9	0.222	203	267	0.760	9th–16th places (Pools G and H)

Date	Time	Venue		Score		Set 1	Set 2	Set 3	Set 4	Set 5	Total	Report
13 Sep	10:30	AVH	Indonesia	3–1	Kuwait	22–25	25–20	25–17	25–18		97–80	P2
13 Sep	18:30	AVH	South Korea	3–0	Pakistan	25–23	25–23	25–19			75–65	P2
14 Sep	16:00	AIS	Kuwait	0–3	South Korea	14–25	16–25	11–25			41–75	P2
14 Sep	16:00	AVH	Pakistan	3–2	Indonesia	25–20	26–24	19–25	20–25	15–13	105–107	P2
15 Sep	10:30	AIS	South Korea	3–0	Indonesia	25–22	25–19	25–20			75–61	P2
15 Sep	10:30	AVH	Kuwait	1–3	Pakistan	19–25	25–20	22–25	16–25		82–95	P2

== Classification round ==
- All times are Iran Daylight Time (UTC+04:30).
- The results and the points of the matches between the same teams that were already played during the preliminary round shall be taken into account for the classification round.

=== Pool E ===
Pos	Team	Pld	W	L	Pts	SW	SL	SR	SPW	SPL	SPR	Qualification
1	Australia	3	3	0	9	9	2	4.500	276	248	1.113	Quarterfinals
2	Iran	3	2	1	6	7	3	2.333	240	213	1.127	Quarterfinals
3	China	3	1	2	3	4	6	0.667	219	226	0.969	Quarterfinals
4	India	3	0	3	0	0	9	0.000	182	230	0.791	Quarterfinals

Date	Time	Venue		Score		Set 1	Set 2	Set 3	Set 4	Set 5	Total	Report
17 Sep	16:00	AVH	Australia	3–0	India	29–27	26–24	25–21			80–72	P2
17 Sep	18:30	AIS	China	0–3	Iran	18–25	23–25	17–25			58–75	P2
18 Sep	18:50	AIS	Iran	3–0	India	25–16	25–21	25–21			75–58	P2
18 Sep	19:05	AVH	Australia	3–1	China	24–26	25–19	25–19	25–22		99–86	P2

=== Pool F ===
Pos	Team	Pld	W	L	Pts	SW	SL	SR	SPW	SPL	SPR	Qualification
1	South Korea	3	3	0	8	9	2	4.500	255	239	1.067	Quarterfinals
2	Japan	3	2	1	7	8	4	2.000	284	248	1.145	Quarterfinals
3	Chinese Taipei	3	1	2	2	4	8	0.500	244	279	0.875	Quarterfinals
4	Pakistan	3	0	3	1	2	9	0.222	233	250	0.932	Quarterfinals

Date	Time	Venue		Score		Set 1	Set 2	Set 3	Set 4	Set 5	Total	Report
17 Sep	10:30	AIS	South Korea	3–0	Chinese Taipei	25–21	25–19	26–24			76–64	P2
17 Sep	18:30	AVH	Japan	3–0	Pakistan	25–23	25–20	25–21			75–64	P2
18 Sep	10:30	AIS	Japan	2–3	South Korea	25–20	23–25	25–18	23–25	14–16	110–104	P2
18 Sep	13:30	AVH	Chinese Taipei	3–2	Pakistan	25–23	17–25	25–20	18–25	15–11	100–104	P2

=== Pool G ===
Pos	Team	Pld	W	L	Pts	SW	SL	SR	SPW	SPL	SPR	Qualification
1	Qatar	3	2	1	6	7	3	2.333	241	192	1.255	9th–12th semifinals
2	Kazakhstan	3	2	1	6	7	4	1.750	266	261	1.019	9th–12th semifinals
3	Sri Lanka	3	2	1	6	6	5	1.200	263	273	0.963	13th–16th semifinals
4	Oman	3	0	3	0	1	9	0.111	215	259	0.830	13th–16th semifinals

Date	Time	Venue		Score		Set 1	Set 2	Set 3	Set 4	Set 5	Total	Report
17 Sep	10:30	AVH	Kazakhstan	1–3	Sri Lanka	33–35	25–22	20–25	22–25		100–107	P2
17 Sep	13:30	AIS	Qatar	3–0	Oman	25–18	25–20	25–16			75–54	P2
18 Sep	10:30	AVH	Sri Lanka	3–1	Oman	33–31	25–19	23–25	25–23		106–98	P2
18 Sep	13:30	AIS	Qatar	1–3	Kazakhstan	21–25	23–25	25–13	22–25		91–88	P2

=== Pool H ===
Pos	Team	Pld	W	L	Pts	SW	SL	SR	SPW	SPL	SPR	Qualification
1	Thailand	3	3	0	8	9	3	3.000	284	241	1.178	9th–12th semifinals
2	Indonesia	3	2	1	7	8	4	2.000	273	250	1.092	9th–12th semifinals
3	Hong Kong	3	1	2	3	4	7	0.571	241	265	0.909	13th–16th semifinals
4	Kuwait	3	0	3	0	2	9	0.222	234	276	0.848	13th–16th semifinals

Date	Time	Venue		Score		Set 1	Set 2	Set 3	Set 4	Set 5	Total	Report
17 Sep	13:30	AVH	Indonesia	3–0	Hong Kong	25–21	25–18	25–20			75–59	P2
17 Sep	16:00	AIS	Thailand	3–0	Kuwait	26–24	25–21	25–16			76–61	P2
18 Sep	16:05	AIS	Thailand	3–2	Indonesia	25–22	25–20	23–25	23–25	15–9	111–101	P2
18 Sep	16:20	AVH	Hong Kong	3–1	Kuwait	25–22	29–27	24–26	25–18		103–93	P2

== Final round ==
- All times are Iran Daylight Time (UTC+04:30).

=== 13th–16th places ===
13th–16th semifinals
19 September
Sri Lanka	3
Kuwait	0
19 September
Hong Kong	0
Oman	3

13th place match
20 September
Sri Lanka	2
Oman	3
15th place match
20 September
Kuwait	3
Hong Kong	2

==== 13th–16th semifinals ====
Date	Time		Score		Set 1	Set 2	Set 3	Set 4	Set 5	Total	Report
19 Sep	10:30	Sri Lanka	3–0	Kuwait	25–17	25–22	25–18			75–57	P2
19 Sep	13:30	Hong Kong	0–3	Oman	21–25	20–25	17–25			58–75	P2

==== 15th place match ====
Date	Time		Score		Set 1	Set 2	Set 3	Set 4	Set 5	Total	Report
20 Sep	10:30	Kuwait	3–2	Hong Kong	19–25	21–25	25–19	25–23	15–12	105–104	P2

==== 13th place match ====
Date	Time		Score		Set 1	Set 2	Set 3	Set 4	Set 5	Total	Report
20 Sep	13:30	Sri Lanka	2–3	Oman	26–24	16–25	25–17	18–25	12–15	97–106	P2

=== 9th–12th places ===
9th–12th semifinals
19 September
Qatar	3
Indonesia	0
19 September
Thailand	2
Kazakhstan	3

9th place match
20 September
Qatar	3
Kazakhstan	1
11th place match
20 September
Indonesia	2
Thailand	3

==== 9th–12th semifinals ====
Date	Time		Score		Set 1	Set 2	Set 3	Set 4	Set 5	Total	Report
19 Sep	16:00	Qatar	3–0	Indonesia	26–24	25–17	25–17			76–58	P2
19 Sep	18:30	Thailand	2–3	Kazakhstan	25–23	20–25	20–25	26–24	12–15	103–112	P2

==== 11th place match ====
Date	Time		Score		Set 1	Set 2	Set 3	Set 4	Set 5	Total	Report
20 Sep	16:20	Indonesia	2–3	Thailand	25–16	28–30	25–21	17–25	10–15	105–107	P2

==== 9th place match ====
Date	Time		Score		Set 1	Set 2	Set 3	Set 4	Set 5	Total	Report
20 Sep	19:00	Qatar	3–1	Kazakhstan	25–12	25–18	29–31	25–19		104–80	P2

=== Final eight ===
Quarterfinals
19 September
South Korea	3
India	1
19 September
Iran	3
Chinese Taipei	0
19 September
Australia	3
Pakistan	2
19 September
Japan	3
China	1

Semifinals
20 September
South Korea	1
Iran	3
20 September
Australia	3
Japan	2

Final
21 September
Iran	3
Australia	0
3rd place match
21 September
South Korea	1
Japan	3

5th–8th semifinals
20 September
India	1
Chinese Taipei	3
20 September
Pakistan	1
China	3

5th place match
21 September
Chinese Taipei	3
China	1
7th place match
21 September
India	2
Pakistan	3

==== Quarterfinals ====
Date	Time		Score		Set 1	Set 2	Set 3	Set 4	Set 5	Total	Report
19 Sep	10:30	Australia	3–2	Pakistan	21–25	21–25	25–18	25–14	15–13	107–95	P2
19 Sep	13:30	South Korea	3–1	India	25–20	25–23	20–25	25–21		95–89	P2
19 Sep	16:05	Japan	3–1	China	25–23	25–17	18–25	25–22		93–87	P2
19 Sep	18:50	Iran	3–0	Chinese Taipei	25–19	27–25	25–21			77–65	P2

==== 5th–8th semifinals ====
Date	Time		Score		Set 1	Set 2	Set 3	Set 4	Set 5	Total	Report
20 Sep	10:00	India	1–3	Chinese Taipei	25–20	22–25	11–25	16–25		74–95	P2
20 Sep	13:30	Pakistan	1–3	China	17–25	19–25	25–15	24–26		85–91	P2

==== Semifinals ====
Date	Time		Score		Set 1	Set 2	Set 3	Set 4	Set 5	Total	Report
20 Sep	16:00	South Korea	1–3	Iran	25–22	23–25	22–25	22–25		92–97	P2
20 Sep	18:50	Australia	3–2	Japan	20–25	25–18	16–25	25–22	15–12	101–102	P2

==== 7th place match ====
Date	Time		Score		Set 1	Set 2	Set 3	Set 4	Set 5	Total	Report
21 Sep	10:00	India	2–3	Pakistan	23–25	21–25	25–20	25–19	6–15	100–104	P2

==== 5th place match ====
Date	Time		Score		Set 1	Set 2	Set 3	Set 4	Set 5	Total	Report
21 Sep	12:55	Chinese Taipei	3–1	China	25–16	23–25	25–20	25–16		98–77	P2

==== 3rd place match ====
Date	Time		Score		Set 1	Set 2	Set 3	Set 4	Set 5	Total	Report
21 Sep	15:15	South Korea	1–3	Japan	23–25	17–25	25–23	22–25		87–98	P2

==== Final ====
Date	Time		Score		Set 1	Set 2	Set 3	Set 4	Set 5	Total	Report
21 Sep	17:50	Iran	3–0	Australia	25–14	25–17	25–21			75–52	P2

== Final standing ==
Rank	Team
1st place, gold medalist(s)	Iran
2nd place, silver medalist(s)	Australia
3rd place, bronze medalist(s)	Japan
4	South Korea
5	Chinese Taipei
6	China
7	Pakistan
8	India
9	Qatar
10	Kazakhstan
11	Thailand
12	Indonesia
13	Oman
14	Sri Lanka
15	Kuwait
16	Hong Kong

Qualified for the 2020 Asian Olympic Qualifier (Pakistan later withdrew and replaced by Kazakhstan)
Already qualified as hosts for the 2020 Summer Olympics

2019 Asian Men's champions

Iran
3rd title

14–man roster
Milad Ebadipour, Saeid Marouf (c), Farhad Ghaemi, Mohammad Mousavi (volleyball), Purya Fayazi, Mohammad Reza Hazratpour, Masoud Gholami, Amir Ghafour, Ali Asghar Mojarrad, Ali Shafiei, Mohammad Reza Moazzen, Porya Yali, Amir Hossein Esfandiar, Javad Karimi
Head coach
Igor Kolaković

== Awards ==
- Most valuable player
  (Australia) Thomas Edgar
- Best setter
  (Iran) Saeid Marouf
- Best outside spikers
  (Japan) Yūki Ishikawa
  (Australia) Samuel Walker
- Best middle blockers
  (South Korea) Shin Yung-suk
  (Iran) Mohammad Mousavi
- Best opposite spiker
  (Iran) Amir Ghafour
- Best libero
  (Japan) Tomohiro Yamamoto
