= 2015 Asian Men's U23 Volleyball Championship =

2015 Asian Men's U23 Championship
Tournament details
- Host country: Myanmar
- Dates: 12–20 May
- Teams: 16
- Venues: 2 (in 1 host city)

Final positions
- Champions: Iran (1st title)

Tournament awards
- MVP: (Iran) Purya Fayazi

The 2015 Asian Men's U23 Volleyball Championship was held in Naypyidaw, Myanmar from 12 to 20 May 2015. It was the inaugural edition of the tournament and served as the Asian qualifier for the 2015 Men's U23 World Championship to be held in Dubai, United Arab Emirates which the top two teams qualified for the world championship. Iran won the tournament and Purya Fayazi was the most valuable player.

== Pools composition ==
Teams were seeded in the first two positions of each pool following the Serpentine system according to their final standing of the 2014 Asian U20 Championship. AVC reserved the right to seed the hosts as head of pool A regardless of the final standing of the 2014 Asian U20 Championship. All teams not seeded were drawn. But, Afghanistan, Malaysia and Turkmenistan later withdrew. Final standing of the 2014 Asian U20 Championship are shown in brackets except the hosts who did not participate in the 2014 Asian U20 Championship.

| Pool A | Pool B | Pool C | Pool D |
|---|---|---|---|
| Myanmar (Hosts) | Iran (1) | China (2) | South Korea (3) |
| Thailand (8) | Qatar (7) | Chinese Taipei (6) | Japan (5) |
| ~~Afghanistan (–)~~ | Philippines (–) | Vietnam (–) | Indonesia (–) |
| Maldives (15) | ~~Malaysia (–)~~ | ~~Turkmenistan (13)~~ | Kazakhstan (10) |
| Saudi Arabia (12) | India (9) | Australia (–) | |

== Venues ==
- Wunna Theikdi Sports Complex – Hall B, Naypyidaw, Myanmar – Pool A, B and Final eight
- Wunna Theikdi Sports Complex – Hall C, Naypyidaw, Myanmar – Pool C, D and 9th–16th places

== Pool standing procedure ==
1. Number of matches won
2. Match points
3. Sets ratio
4. Points ratio
5. Result of the last match between the tied teams

Match won 3–0 or 3–1: 3 match points for the winner, 0 match points for the loser
Match won 3–2: 2 match points for the winner, 1 match point for the loser

== Preliminary round ==
- All times are Myanmar Standard Time (UTC+06:30).

=== Pool A ===
| Pos | Team | Pld | W | L | Pts | SW | SL | SR | SPW | SPL | SPR | Qualification |
|---|---|---|---|---|---|---|---|---|---|---|---|---|
| 1 | Myanmar | 3 | 3 | 0 | 9 | 9 | 0 | MAX | 226 | 166 | 1.361 | Quarterfinals |
| 2 | Thailand | 3 | 2 | 1 | 6 | 6 | 3 | 2.000 | 220 | 201 | 1.095 | Quarterfinals |
| 3 | Saudi Arabia | 3 | 1 | 2 | 2 | 3 | 8 | 0.375 | 244 | 258 | 0.946 | 9th–16th quarterfinals |
| 4 | Maldives | 3 | 0 | 3 | 1 | 2 | 9 | 0.222 | 196 | 261 | 0.751 | 9th–16th quarterfinals |

| Date | Time | | Score | | Set 1 | Set 2 | Set 3 | Set 4 | Set 5 | Total | Report |
|---|---|---|---|---|---|---|---|---|---|---|---|
| 12 May | 12:30 | Myanmar | 3–0 | Maldives | 25–12 | 25–14 | 25–16 | | | 75–42 | Report |
| 12 May | 14:30 | Thailand | 3–0 | Saudi Arabia | 25–16 | 25–22 | 34–32 | | | 84–70 | Report |
| 13 May | 12:30 | Myanmar | 3–0 | Thailand | 25–21 | 25–20 | 25–20 | | | 75–61 | Report |
| 14 May | 12:30 | Maldives | 0–3 | Thailand | 23–25 | 18–25 | 15–25 | | | 56–75 | Report |
| 15 May | 12:30 | Saudi Arabia | 0–3 | Myanmar | 20–25 | 24–26 | 19–25 | | | 63–76 | Report |
| 16 May | 12:30 | Saudi Arabia | 3–2 | Maldives | 25–19 | 25–27 | 21–25 | 25–15 | 15–12 | 111–98 | Report |

=== Pool B ===
| Pos | Team | Pld | W | L | Pts | SW | SL | SR | SPW | SPL | SPR | Qualification |
|---|---|---|---|---|---|---|---|---|---|---|---|---|
| 1 | Iran | 3 | 3 | 0 | 9 | 9 | 0 | MAX | 225 | 160 | 1.406 | Quarterfinals |
| 2 | India | 3 | 2 | 1 | 6 | 6 | 3 | 2.000 | 208 | 208 | 1.000 | Quarterfinals |
| 3 | Qatar | 3 | 1 | 2 | 3 | 3 | 6 | 0.500 | 188 | 201 | 0.935 | 9th–16th quarterfinals |
| 4 | Philippines | 3 | 0 | 3 | 0 | 0 | 9 | 0.000 | 178 | 230 | 0.774 | 9th–16th quarterfinals |

| Date | Time | | Score | | Set 1 | Set 2 | Set 3 | Set 4 | Set 5 | Total | Report |
|---|---|---|---|---|---|---|---|---|---|---|---|
| 13 May | 14:30 | Iran | 3–0 | India | 25–23 | 25–21 | 25–9 | | | 75–53 | Report |
| 13 May | 16:30 | Qatar | 3–0 | Philippines | 25–14 | 25–18 | 25–19 | | | 75–51 | Report |
| 14 May | 14:30 | India | 3–0 | Philippines | 25–19 | 25–21 | 30–28 | | | 80–68 | Report |
| 15 May | 14:30 | Iran | 3–0 | Qatar | 25–12 | 25–18 | 25–18 | | | 75–48 | Report |
| 16 May | 14:30 | Qatar | 0–3 | India | 23–25 | 20–25 | 22–25 | | | 65–75 | Report |
| 16 May | 16:30 | Philippines | 0–3 | Iran | 18–25 | 21–25 | 20–25 | | | 59–75 | Report |

=== Pool C ===
| Pos | Team | Pld | W | L | Pts | SW | SL | SR | SPW | SPL | SPR | Qualification |
|---|---|---|---|---|---|---|---|---|---|---|---|---|
| 1 | Chinese Taipei | 3 | 3 | 0 | 8 | 9 | 3 | 3.000 | 281 | 256 | 1.098 | Quarterfinals |
| 2 | China | 3 | 2 | 1 | 6 | 7 | 4 | 1.750 | 261 | 234 | 1.115 | Quarterfinals |
| 3 | Australia | 3 | 1 | 2 | 4 | 6 | 6 | 1.000 | 274 | 263 | 1.042 | 9th–16th quarterfinals |
| 4 | Vietnam | 3 | 0 | 3 | 0 | 0 | 9 | 0.000 | 162 | 225 | 0.720 | 9th–16th quarterfinals |

| Date | Time | | Score | | Set 1 | Set 2 | Set 3 | Set 4 | Set 5 | Total | Report |
|---|---|---|---|---|---|---|---|---|---|---|---|
| 12 May | 14:30 | Vietnam | 0–3 | Chinese Taipei | 15–25 | 19–25 | 23–25 | | | 57–75 | Report |
| 13 May | 12:30 | Australia | 2–3 | Chinese Taipei | 23–25 | 24–26 | 25–22 | 25–21 | 13–15 | 110–109 | Report |
| 13 May | 14:30 | China | 3–0 | Vietnam | 25–11 | 25–14 | 25–23 | | | 75–48 | Report |
| 14 May | 12:30 | Australia | 1–3 | China | 23–25 | 25–22 | 20–25 | 21–25 | | 89–97 | Report |
| 15 May | 12:30 | Chinese Taipei | 3–1 | China | 22–25 | 25–23 | 25–20 | 25–21 | | 97–89 | Report |
| 16 May | 12:30 | Vietnam | 0–3 | Australia | 19–25 | 21–25 | 17–25 | | | 57–75 | Report |

=== Pool D ===
| Pos | Team | Pld | W | L | Pts | SW | SL | SR | SPW | SPL | SPR | Qualification |
|---|---|---|---|---|---|---|---|---|---|---|---|---|
| 1 | South Korea | 3 | 3 | 0 | 9 | 9 | 1 | 9.000 | 248 | 186 | 1.333 | Quarterfinals |
| 2 | Japan | 3 | 2 | 1 | 6 | 6 | 5 | 1.200 | 255 | 249 | 1.024 | Quarterfinals |
| 3 | Indonesia | 3 | 1 | 2 | 3 | 4 | 7 | 0.571 | 242 | 261 | 0.927 | 9th–16th quarterfinals |
| 4 | Kazakhstan | 3 | 0 | 3 | 0 | 3 | 9 | 0.333 | 245 | 294 | 0.833 | 9th–16th quarterfinals |

| Date | Time | | Score | | Set 1 | Set 2 | Set 3 | Set 4 | Set 5 | Total | Report |
|---|---|---|---|---|---|---|---|---|---|---|---|
| 12 May | 16:30 | South Korea | 3–1 | Kazakhstan | 25–22 | 23–25 | 25–11 | 25–23 | | 98–81 | Report |
| 12 May | 18:30 | Indonesia | 1–3 | Japan | 20–25 | 27–29 | 25–22 | 23–25 | | 95–101 | Report |
| 14 May | 14:30 | Kazakhstan | 1–3 | Japan | 15–25 | 22–25 | 25–23 | 17–25 | | 79–98 | Report |
| 14 May | 16:30 | South Korea | 3–0 | Indonesia | 25–16 | 25–16 | 25–17 | | | 75–49 | Report |
| 15 May | 16:30 | Indonesia | 3–1 | Kazakhstan | 25–19 | 25–21 | 23–25 | 25–20 | | 98–85 | Report |
| 16 May | 16:30 | Japan | 0–3 | South Korea | 21–25 | 22–25 | 13–25 | | | 56–75 | Report |

== Final round ==
- All times are Myanmar Standard Time (UTC+06:30).
- The first and third placed teams of each Preliminary round pools were seeded in Quarterfinals and 9th–16th Quarterfinals respectively. The second and fourth placed teams of each Preliminary round pools were drawn to match the first and third placed teams respectively. The teams in same pool in preliminary round didn't play each other in Quarterfinals and 9th–16th Quarterfinals.

=== 9th–16th places ===
9th–16th quarterfinals
18 May
Saudi Arabia | 3
Philippines | 2
18 May
Indonesia | 3
Vietnam | 0
18 May
Qatar | 3
Kazakhstan | 1
18 May
Australia | 3
Maldives | 1

9th–12th semifinals
19 May
Saudi Arabia | 0
Indonesia | 3
19 May
Qatar | 1
Australia | 3

9th place match
20 May
Indonesia | 3
Australia | 1
11th place match
20 May
Saudi Arabia | 0
Qatar | 3

13th–16th semifinals
19 May
Philippines | 3
Vietnam | 2
19 May
Kazakhstan | 3
Maldives | 0

13th place match
20 May
Philippines | 1
Kazakhstan | 3
15th place match
20 May
Vietnam | 3
Maldives | 1

==== 9th–16th quarterfinals ====
| Date | Time | | Score | | Set 1 | Set 2 | Set 3 | Set 4 | Set 5 | Total | Report |
|---|---|---|---|---|---|---|---|---|---|---|---|
| 18 May | 12:30 | Saudi Arabia | 3–2 | Philippines | 25–18 | 24–26 | 25–27 | 25–21 | 15–11 | 114–103 | Report |
| 18 May | 14:30 | Indonesia | 3–0 | Vietnam | 25–13 | 25–20 | 25–16 | | | 75–49 | Report |
| 18 May | 16:30 | Qatar | 3–1 | Kazakhstan | 25–19 | 25–22 | 19–25 | 25–23 | | 94–89 | Report |
| 18 May | 18:30 | Australia | 3–1 | Maldives | 25–16 | 23–25 | 25–20 | 25–10 | | 98–71 | Report |

==== 13th–16th semifinals ====
| Date | Time | | Score | | Set 1 | Set 2 | Set 3 | Set 4 | Set 5 | Total | Report |
|---|---|---|---|---|---|---|---|---|---|---|---|
| 19 May | 12:30 | Philippines | 3–2 | Vietnam | 28–26 | 28–30 | 31–33 | 27–25 | 15–8 | 129–122 | |
| 19 May | 14:30 | Kazakhstan | 3–0 | Maldives | 25–23 | 25–20 | 25–19 | | | 75–62 | |

==== 9th–12th semifinals ====
| Date | Time | | Score | | Set 1 | Set 2 | Set 3 | Set 4 | Set 5 | Total | Report |
|---|---|---|---|---|---|---|---|---|---|---|---|
| 19 May | 16:30 | Saudi Arabia | 0–3 | Indonesia | 21–25 | 13–25 | 17–25 | | | 51–75 | |
| 19 May | 18:30 | Qatar | 1–3 | Australia | 15–25 | 25–23 | 24–26 | 23–25 | | 87–99 | |

==== 15th place match ====
| Date | Time | | Score | | Set 1 | Set 2 | Set 3 | Set 4 | Set 5 | Total | Report |
|---|---|---|---|---|---|---|---|---|---|---|---|
| 20 May | 10:30 | Vietnam | 3–1 | Maldives | 25–18 | 24–26 | 25–20 | 25–20 | | 99–84 | |

==== 13th place match ====
| Date | Time | | Score | | Set 1 | Set 2 | Set 3 | Set 4 | Set 5 | Total | Report |
|---|---|---|---|---|---|---|---|---|---|---|---|
| 20 May | 12:30 | Philippines | 1–3 | Kazakhstan | 18–25 | 25–20 | 18–25 | 16–25 | | 77–95 | |

==== 11th place match ====
| Date | Time | | Score | | Set 1 | Set 2 | Set 3 | Set 4 | Set 5 | Total | Report |
|---|---|---|---|---|---|---|---|---|---|---|---|
| 20 May | 14:30 | Saudi Arabia | 0–3 | Qatar | 18–25 | 16–25 | 18–25 | | | 52–75 | |

==== 9th place match ====
| Date | Time | | Score | | Set 1 | Set 2 | Set 3 | Set 4 | Set 5 | Total | Report |
|---|---|---|---|---|---|---|---|---|---|---|---|
| 20 May | 16:30 | Indonesia | 3–1 | Australia | 25–21 | 21–25 | 25–15 | 25–16 | | 96–77 | |

=== Final eight ===
Quarterfinals
18 May
Myanmar | 1
China | 3
18 May
South Korea | 3
Thailand | 0
18 May
Iran | 3
Japan | 0
18 May
Chinese Taipei | 3
India | 1

Semifinals
19 May
China | 2
South Korea | 3
19 May
Iran | 3
Chinese Taipei | 2

Final
20 May
South Korea | 0
Iran | 3
3rd place match
20 May
China | 1
Chinese Taipei | 3

5th–8th semifinals
19 May
Myanmar | 3
Thailand | 0
19 May
Japan | 3
India | 0

5th place match
20 May
Myanmar | 3
Japan | 2
7th place match
20 May
Thailand | 3
India | 2

==== Quarterfinals ====
| Date | Time | | Score | | Set 1 | Set 2 | Set 3 | Set 4 | Set 5 | Total | Report |
|---|---|---|---|---|---|---|---|---|---|---|---|
| 18 May | 12:30 | Myanmar | 1–3 | China | 21–25 | 14–25 | 25–21 | 22–25 | | 82–96 | Report |
| 18 May | 14:30 | South Korea | 3–0 | Thailand | 25–22 | 25–18 | 25–18 | | | 75–58 | Report |
| 18 May | 16:30 | Iran | 3–0 | Japan | 25–19 | 25–15 | 25–23 | | | 75–57 | Report |
| 18 May | 18:30 | Chinese Taipei | 3–1 | India | 23–25 | 26–24 | 25–20 | 25–21 | | 99–90 | Report |

==== 5th–8th semifinals ====
| Date | Time | | Score | | Set 1 | Set 2 | Set 3 | Set 4 | Set 5 | Total | Report |
|---|---|---|---|---|---|---|---|---|---|---|---|
| 19 May | 12:30 | Myanmar | 3–0 | Thailand | 25–23 | 25–20 | 25–22 | | | 75–65 | |
| 19 May | 14:30 | Japan | 3–0 | India | 25–22 | 25–15 | 25–17 | | | 75–54 | |

==== Semifinals ====
| Date | Time | | Score | | Set 1 | Set 2 | Set 3 | Set 4 | Set 5 | Total | Report |
|---|---|---|---|---|---|---|---|---|---|---|---|
| 19 May | 16:30 | China | 2–3 | South Korea | 25–22 | 20–25 | 16–25 | 25–20 | 10–15 | 96–107 | |
| 19 May | 18:30 | Iran | 3–2 | Chinese Taipei | 19–25 | 22–25 | 25–22 | 25–20 | 15–12 | 106–104 | |

==== 7th place match ====
| Date | Time | | Score | | Set 1 | Set 2 | Set 3 | Set 4 | Set 5 | Total | Report |
|---|---|---|---|---|---|---|---|---|---|---|---|
| 20 May | 10:30 | Thailand | 3–2 | India | 20–25 | 23–25 | 25–22 | 25–19 | 16–14 | 109–105 | |

==== 5th place match ====
| Date | Time | | Score | | Set 1 | Set 2 | Set 3 | Set 4 | Set 5 | Total | Report |
|---|---|---|---|---|---|---|---|---|---|---|---|
| 20 May | 12:30 | Myanmar | 3–2 | Japan | 23–25 | 25–22 | 25–17 | 19–25 | 15–13 | 107–102 | |

==== 3rd place match ====
| Date | Time | | Score | | Set 1 | Set 2 | Set 3 | Set 4 | Set 5 | Total | Report |
|---|---|---|---|---|---|---|---|---|---|---|---|
| 20 May | 14:30 | China | 1–3 | Chinese Taipei | 25–27 | 21–25 | 25–21 | 23–25 | | 94–98 | |

==== Final ====
| Date | Time | | Score | | Set 1 | Set 2 | Set 3 | Set 4 | Set 5 | Total | Report |
|---|---|---|---|---|---|---|---|---|---|---|---|
| 20 May | 16:30 | South Korea | 0–3 | Iran | 16–25 | 21–25 | 21–25 | | | 58–75 | |

== Final standing ==
| Rank | Team |
|---|---|
| 1st place, gold medalist(s) | Iran |
| 2nd place, silver medalist(s) | South Korea |
| 3rd place, bronze medalist(s) | Chinese Taipei |
| 4 | China |
| 5 | Myanmar |
| 6 | Japan |
| 7 | Thailand |
| 8 | India |
| 9 | Indonesia |
| 10 | Australia |
| 11 | Qatar |
| 12 | Saudi Arabia |
| 13 | Kazakhstan |
| 14 | Philippines |
| 15 | Vietnam |
| 16 | Maldives |

| Qualified for the 2015 U23 World Championship |

2015 Asian Men's U23 champions

Iran
1st title

12–man roster
Pouya, Ghaleh, Razipour, Bagheri, Fallah, Fayazi (c), Shahsavari, Javaheri, Hosseinabadi, Manavinejad, Fathali, Nasr
Head coach
Akbari

== Awards ==
- Most valuable player
  (Iran) Purya Fayazi
- Best setter
  (Iran) Mostafa Bagheri
- Best outside spikers
  (Iran) Purya Fayazi
  (Chinese Taipei) Liu Hung-Min
- Best middle blockers
  (South Korea) Kim In-hyeok
  (Iran) Javad Hosseinabadi
- Best opposite spiker
  (South Korea) Jung Ji-seok
- Best libero
  (South Korea) Lee Ji-hun

== See also ==
- 2015 Asian Women's U23 Volleyball Championship
