= 2026 AVC Men's Volleyball Cup Pool A =

Pool A was one of the two pools of the preliminary round of the 2026 AVC Men's Volleyball Cup that took place from 20 to 26 June 2026 at the Veer Savarkar Sports Complex in Ahmedabad, Gujarat, India. The pool consisted of the host country, India, alongside Australia, Bahrain, Chinese Taipei, Kazakhstan, and New Zealand. Teams competed in a round-robin format with a rest day on 24 June. The top two teams from the pool advanced to the semifinals, while the third-, fourth-, and fifth-placed teams qualified for the classification matches.

The pool stage was characterized by a dominant performance from the host nation. India finished undefeated in Pool A, winning all five of its matches while dropping only a single set across the preliminary round. This performance secured India the top seed out of the group, while Bahrain finished in second place and both advanced to the semifinals. The campaign also resulted in India rising from world No. 60 to No. 42 in the FIVB rankings.

== Teams ==
The following six teams competed in Pool A for the tournament, listed by their position in the pool.

Position	Team	Method of qualification	Date of qualification	Appearance(s)				Previous best performance
Position	Team	Method of qualification	Date of qualification	Total	First	Last	Streak	Previous best performance
A1	India	Host country	20 December 2025	2nd	2023	2023	2	15th place (2023)
A2	Australia (Note: As China, Iran, and Japan were ineligible due to competing in the 2026 FIVB Men's Volleyball Nations League, and with Bahrain qualifying as defending champions, their ranking slots were reallocated to the next highest-ranked teams.)	3rd World ranked AVC team	2 February 2026	4th	2023	2025	4	5th place (2023, 2025)
A3	Bahrain	Defending champions	24 June 2025	4th	2023	2025	4	Champions (2025)
A4	Chinese Taipei (Note: As South Korea had already qualified, its slot was reallocated to Chinese Taipei.)	2025 EAVA runners-up	2 February 2026	4th	2023	2025	4	7th place (2025)
A5	Kazakhstan (Note: As India and Pakistan had already qualified, their slots were reallocated to Kazakhstan.)	2025 CAVA 4th placers	2 February 2026	3rd	2023	2024	1	4th place (2024)
A6	New Zealand	2025 OZVA runners-up	2 February 2026	2nd	2025	2025	2	11th place (2025)

== World Rankings ==
The following six teams were ranked in the FIVB World Rankings at the beginning and the final day of the tournament.

Position	Country	FIVB World Rankings	
Position	Country	Before (Note: The FIVB World Ranking before the first game on 20 June 2026.)	After (Note: The FIVB World Ranking after the final game on 28 June 2026.)
A1	India	61 (65.26)	42 (101.86)
A2	Australia	37 (114.61)	51 (81.35)
A3	Bahrain	42 (105.08)	41 (102.66)
A4	Chinese Taipei	55 (72.73)	58 (67.55)
A5	Kazakhstan	74 (50.76)	62 (63.73)
A6	New Zealand	95 (34.60)	112 (13.76)

== Standings ==
Pos	Team	Pld	W	L	Pts	SW	SL	SR	SPW	SPL	SPR	Qualification
1	India (H)	5	5	0	15	15	1	15.000	403	317	1.271	Semifinals
2	Bahrain	5	4	1	12	12	6	2.000	429	392	1.094	Semifinals
3	Kazakhstan	5	3	2	8	10	10	1.000	441	467	0.944	5th place match
4	Chinese Taipei	5	2	3	6	9	10	0.900	434	443	0.980	7th place match
5	New Zealand	5	1	4	2	4	14	0.286	376	443	0.849	9th place match
6	Australia	5	0	5	2	6	15	0.400	466	487	0.957	

Source: Volleyball World
Rules for classification: Pool standing procedure
(H) Host

== Matches ==
All times are Indian Standard Time (UTC+05:30).

=== Bahrain vs. Chinese Taipei ===
This was the second consecutive AVC Volleyball Cup meeting between Bahrain and Chinese Taipei, following Bahrain's victory in their first tournament matchup in 2025.

20 June 2026; 15:00	Bahrain	3–1	Chinese Taipei	Veer Savarkar Sports Complex; Attendance: 615; Referees: Jatuporn Kittichaisombat (THA), Lee Kwang-hun (KOR)
20 June 2026; 15:00	(25–22, 23–25, 25–22, 25–20); P2 Boxscore			Veer Savarkar Sports Complex; Attendance: 615; Referees: Jatuporn Kittichaisombat (THA), Lee Kwang-hun (KOR)
20 June 2026; 15:00	Scoring leaders			Veer Savarkar Sports Complex; Attendance: 615; Referees: Jatuporn Kittichaisombat (THA), Lee Kwang-hun (KOR)
Abdulwahed (21/61)		Total	Wen Y.K. (21/59)
Abdulwahed (19/34)		Attack	Wen Y.K. (19/33)
H. Ali (5/13)		Block	Lu C.Y.K. (2/11)
Abdulwahed (1/24)		Serve	Chen J.T. (1/13)

=== India vs. New Zealand ===
The match marked host nation India's debut in the AVC Volleyball Cup and was its first meeting against New Zealand in the tournament.

20 June 2026; 21:00	India	3–0	New Zealand	Veer Savarkar Sports Complex; Attendance: 2,500; Referees: Fahad Mohammed I A Alawadhi (QAT), Doszhan Ualkhanov (KAZ)
20 June 2026; 21:00	(25–23, 25–19, 25–14); P2 Boxscore			Veer Savarkar Sports Complex; Attendance: 2,500; Referees: Fahad Mohammed I A Alawadhi (QAT), Doszhan Ualkhanov (KAZ)
20 June 2026; 21:00	Scoring leaders			Veer Savarkar Sports Complex; Attendance: 2,500; Referees: Fahad Mohammed I A Alawadhi (QAT), Doszhan Ualkhanov (KAZ)
Chirag (13/48)		Total	Grant (17/43)
Chirag (10/26)		Attack	Grant (14/31)
John (5/7)		Block	Hodder (2/2)
Chirag (1/14)		Serve	Grant (2/9)

=== Australia vs. Chinese Taipei ===
This was the third consecutive AVC Volleyball Cup meeting between Australia and Chinese Taipei, with Australia having won both previous matches in 2024 and 2025.

21 June 2026; 9:00	Australia	1–3	Chinese Taipei	Veer Savarkar Sports Complex; Attendance: 200; Referees: Sulaiman Al Moqbali (OMA), Jatuporn Kittichaisombat (THA)
21 June 2026; 9:00	(23–25, 22–25, 25–23, 19–25); P2 Boxscore			Veer Savarkar Sports Complex; Attendance: 200; Referees: Sulaiman Al Moqbali (OMA), Jatuporn Kittichaisombat (THA)
21 June 2026; 9:00	Scoring leaders			Veer Savarkar Sports Complex; Attendance: 200; Referees: Sulaiman Al Moqbali (OMA), Jatuporn Kittichaisombat (THA)
Flowerday (17/58)		Total	Wen Y.K. (23/56)
Flowerday (16/35)		Attack	Wen Y.K. (22/34)
Weir (6/14)		Block	Lu C.Y.K. (1/12)
Aubrey (2/14)		Serve	Chen J.T. (2/20)

=== New Zealand vs. Bahrain ===
The match between New Zealand and Bahrain marked the first time the two national teams faced each other in the history of the AVC Volleyball Cup.

21 June 2026; 12:00	New Zealand	0–3	Bahrain	Veer Savarkar Sports Complex; Attendance: 150; Referees: Doszhan Ualkhanov (KAZ), Fahad Mohammed I A Alawadhi (QAT)
21 June 2026; 12:00	(19–25, 21–25, 16–25); P2 Boxscore			Veer Savarkar Sports Complex; Attendance: 150; Referees: Doszhan Ualkhanov (KAZ), Fahad Mohammed I A Alawadhi (QAT)
21 June 2026; 12:00	Scoring leaders			Veer Savarkar Sports Complex; Attendance: 150; Referees: Doszhan Ualkhanov (KAZ), Fahad Mohammed I A Alawadhi (QAT)
Hodder (11/39)		Total	Mahmood (11/34)
Hodder (9/19)		Attack	Mahmood (10/13)
Grant (3/7)		Block	H. Mohamed (3/7)
Hodder (2/15)		Serve	A. Moh"D (1/3)

=== India vs. Kazakhstan ===
This was the first meeting between India and Kazakhstan in the AVC Volleyball Cup, though they had recently played each other in the 2025 CAVA Nations League, where India won.

21 June 2026; 21:00	India	3–0	Kazakhstan	Veer Savarkar Sports Complex; Attendance: 5,000; Referees: Mary Kerekere (NZL), Agung Purwantoro (INA)
21 June 2026; 21:00	(25–16, 25–21, 25–15); P2 Boxscore			Veer Savarkar Sports Complex; Attendance: 5,000; Referees: Mary Kerekere (NZL), Agung Purwantoro (INA)
21 June 2026; 21:00	Scoring leaders			Veer Savarkar Sports Complex; Attendance: 5,000; Referees: Mary Kerekere (NZL), Agung Purwantoro (INA)
Chirag (14/39)		Total	Mastikhin (16w/34)
Chirag (12/19)		Attack	Mastikhin (16/25)
John (3/7)		Block	Zhaxylykov (3/8)
Chirag (2/18)		Serve	Zhaxylykov (1/12)

=== Australia vs. Kazakhstan ===
This was the second meeting between Australia and Kazakhstan in the AVC Volleyball Cup; Kazakhstan won their previous match in 2024.

22 June 2026; 12:00	Australia	2–3	Kazakhstan	Veer Savarkar Sports Complex; Attendance: 279; Referees: Chih Hao-chang (TPE), Narendrasingh Ripudamansingh Kshatriya (IND)
22 June 2026; 12:00	(25–15, 25–21, 23–25, 24–26, 14–16); P2 Boxscore			Veer Savarkar Sports Complex; Attendance: 279; Referees: Chih Hao-chang (TPE), Narendrasingh Ripudamansingh Kshatriya (IND)
22 June 2026; 12:00	Scoring leaders			Veer Savarkar Sports Complex; Attendance: 279; Referees: Chih Hao-chang (TPE), Narendrasingh Ripudamansingh Kshatriya (IND)
Aubrey (21/67)		Total	Mastikhin (19/63)
Aubrey (17/34)		Attack	Mastikhin (15/38)
Aubrey (4/13)		Block	Kuznetsov (8/20)
Flowerday (5/29)		Serve	Mastikhin (3/22)

=== India vs. Chinese Taipei ===
This match marks the first meeting between India and Chinese Taipei in the AVC Volleyball Cup, and their first encounter since the 2022 Asian Games, which India won, and the 2022 AVC Cup for Men, which Chinese Taipei won.

22 June 2026; 21:00	India	3–1	Chinese Taipei	Veer Savarkar Sports Complex; Attendance: 2,500; Referees: Jaek Passier (AUS), Sulaiman Al Moqbali (OMA)
22 June 2026; 21:00	(22–25, 25–14, 25–22, 25–22); P2 Boxscore			Veer Savarkar Sports Complex; Attendance: 2,500; Referees: Jaek Passier (AUS), Sulaiman Al Moqbali (OMA)
22 June 2026; 21:00	Scoring leaders			Veer Savarkar Sports Complex; Attendance: 2,500; Referees: Jaek Passier (AUS), Sulaiman Al Moqbali (OMA)
Chirag (20/58)		Total	Wen Y.K. (17/62)
Chirag (17/37)		Attack	Wen Y.K. (15/40)
John (4/13)		Block	Wang P.H. (4/14)
Joel (1/14)		Serve

=== New Zealand vs. Australia ===
This match marked the first meeting between New Zealand and Australia in the AVC Volleyball Cup, following their previous encounter at the 2025 Oceania Zonal Continental Qualification Tournament, where Australia won.

23 June 2026; 12:00	New Zealand	3–2	Australia	Veer Savarkar Sports Complex; Attendance: 350; Referees: Narendrasingh Ripudamansingh Kshatriya (IND), Ahmed Ali Hasan (BHR)
23 June 2026; 12:00	(16–25, 25–23, 27–25, 19–25, 17–15); P2 Boxscore			Veer Savarkar Sports Complex; Attendance: 350; Referees: Narendrasingh Ripudamansingh Kshatriya (IND), Ahmed Ali Hasan (BHR)
23 June 2026; 12:00	Scoring leaders			Veer Savarkar Sports Complex; Attendance: 350; Referees: Narendrasingh Ripudamansingh Kshatriya (IND), Ahmed Ali Hasan (BHR)
Grant (17/67)		Total	Flowerday (16/49)
Grant (16/43)		Attack	D'Arcy (14/26)
Corson (5/12)		Block	O'Dea (1/10)
Hodder (4/20)		Serve	Flowerday (3/15)

=== Chinese Taipei vs. Kazakhstan ===
This match marked the first meeting between Chinese Taipei and Kazakhstan in the AVC Volleyball Cup, and their first encounter since the 2022 Asian Games, which Kazakhstan won.

23 June 2026; 15:00	Chinese Taipei	1–3	Kazakhstan	Veer Savarkar Sports Complex; Attendance: 350; Referees: Agung Purwantoro (INA), Sulaiman Al Moqbali (OMA)
23 June 2026; 15:00	(25–20, 24–26, 16–25, 23–25); P2 Boxscore			Veer Savarkar Sports Complex; Attendance: 350; Referees: Agung Purwantoro (INA), Sulaiman Al Moqbali (OMA)
23 June 2026; 15:00	Scoring leaders			Veer Savarkar Sports Complex; Attendance: 350; Referees: Agung Purwantoro (INA), Sulaiman Al Moqbali (OMA)
Wen Y.K. (20/46)		Total	Mastikhin (23/63)
Wen Y.K. (17/29)		Attack	Mastikhin (20/40)
Huang Y.C. (2/3)		Block	Kuznetsov (9/19)
Wang P.H. (1/11)		Serve	Zhaxylykov, Izbergenuly (1/16)

=== India vs. Bahrain ===
This match marked the first meeting between India and Bahrain in the tournament, following two prior matchups at the 2021 Asian Championship where both teams recorded one victory against each other.

23 June 2026; 21:00	India	3–0	Bahrain	Veer Savarkar Sports Complex; Attendance: 2,500; Referees: Lee Kwang-hun (KOR), Jatuporn Kittichaisombat (THA)
23 June 2026; 21:00	(25–21, 25–16, 25–22); P2 Boxscore			Veer Savarkar Sports Complex; Attendance: 2,500; Referees: Lee Kwang-hun (KOR), Jatuporn Kittichaisombat (THA)
23 June 2026; 21:00	Scoring leaders			Veer Savarkar Sports Complex; Attendance: 2,500; Referees: Lee Kwang-hun (KOR), Jatuporn Kittichaisombat (THA)
Chirag (15/41)		Total	Mahmood (15/41)
Chirag (14/25)		Attack	Mahmood (15/28)
John (5/10)		Block	H. Ali (2/6)
		Serve	H. Ali (1/13)

=== Chinese Taipei vs. New Zealand ===
This match marked the first meeting between Chinese Taipei and New Zealand in the tournament, and their first encounter since the 2018 FIVB World Championship qualification, which Chinese Taipei won.

25 June 2026; 15:00	Chinese Taipei	3–0	New Zealand	Veer Savarkar Sports Complex; Attendance: 550; Referees: Sulaiman Al Moqbali (OMA), Jatuporn Kittichaisombat (THA)
25 June 2026; 15:00	(25–19, 25–23, 25–22); P2 Boxscore			Veer Savarkar Sports Complex; Attendance: 550; Referees: Sulaiman Al Moqbali (OMA), Jatuporn Kittichaisombat (THA)
25 June 2026; 15:00	Scoring leaders			Veer Savarkar Sports Complex; Attendance: 550; Referees: Sulaiman Al Moqbali (OMA), Jatuporn Kittichaisombat (THA)
Wen Y.K. (16/43)		Total	Grant (16/42)
Wen Y.K. (14/24)		Attack	Grant (16/29)
Lu C.Y.K. (3/7)		Block	Corson (3/7)
Wen Y.K. (2/16)		Serve	Hodder (3/17)

=== Bahrain vs. Kazakhstan ===
This match marked the first meeting between Bahrain and Kazakhstan in the AVC Volleyball Cup, and their first encounter since Bahrain's victory at the 2021 Asian Championship.

25 June 2026; 18:00	Bahrain	3–1	Kazakhstan	Veer Savarkar Sports Complex; Attendance: 2,152; Referees: Chih Hao-chang (TPE), Lee Kwang-hun (KOR)
25 June 2026; 18:00	(22–25, 25–23, 25–17, 25–20); P2 Boxscore			Veer Savarkar Sports Complex; Attendance: 2,152; Referees: Chih Hao-chang (TPE), Lee Kwang-hun (KOR)
25 June 2026; 18:00	Scoring leaders			Veer Savarkar Sports Complex; Attendance: 2,152; Referees: Chih Hao-chang (TPE), Lee Kwang-hun (KOR)
Abdulwahed (18/60)		Total	Mastikhin (27/69)
Abdulwahed (16/37)		Attack	Mastikhin (24/46)
Mohammed (2/8)		Block	Zhaxylykov (5/22)
M. Alafyah (2/7)		Serve	Zhaxylykov (2/13)

=== India vs. Australia ===
This match marked the first meeting between India and Australia at the AVC Volleyball Cup, with their last head-to-head encounter occurring at the 2022 AVC Cup for Men, where Australia won.

25 June 2026; 21:00	India	3–0	Australia	Veer Savarkar Sports Complex; Attendance: 2,855; Referees: Doszhan Ualkhanov (KAZ), Fahad Mohammed I A Alawadhi (QAT)
25 June 2026; 21:00	(26–24, 25–14, 30–28); P2 Boxscore			Veer Savarkar Sports Complex; Attendance: 2,855; Referees: Doszhan Ualkhanov (KAZ), Fahad Mohammed I A Alawadhi (QAT)
25 June 2026; 21:00	Scoring leaders			Veer Savarkar Sports Complex; Attendance: 2,855; Referees: Doszhan Ualkhanov (KAZ), Fahad Mohammed I A Alawadhi (QAT)
Joe (13/39)		Total	Aubrey (16/47)
Joe (12/22)		Attack	Aubrey (14/29)
John (2/13)		Block	O'Dea (2/3)
Shikhar (3/18)		Serve

=== New Zealand vs. Kazakhstan ===
This match marked the first meeting between New Zealand and Kazakhstan in any senior international volleyball tournaments.

26 June 2026; 12:00	New Zealand	1–3	Kazakhstan	Veer Savarkar Sports Complex; Attendance: 315; Referees: Jatuporn Kittichaisombat (THA), Agung Purwantoro (INA)
26 June 2026; 12:00	(21–25, 19–25, 25–22, 31–33); P2 Boxscore			Veer Savarkar Sports Complex; Attendance: 315; Referees: Jatuporn Kittichaisombat (THA), Agung Purwantoro (INA)
26 June 2026; 12:00	Scoring leaders			Veer Savarkar Sports Complex; Attendance: 315; Referees: Jatuporn Kittichaisombat (THA), Agung Purwantoro (INA)
Grant (19/60)		Total	Mastikhin (22/61)
Grant (17/38)		Attack	Mastikhin (21/38)
Smith (3/6)		Block	Kabdulov (4/11)
Hodder (2/16)		Serve	Zhaxylykov (1/14)

=== Australia vs. Bahrain ===
This was the second meeting between Australia and Bahrain in the AVC Volleyball Cup, following Bahrain's victory in their 2024 encounter.

26 June 2026; 21:00	Australia	1–3	Bahrain	Veer Savarkar Sports Complex; Attendance: 1,021; Referees: Mary Kerekere (NZL), Doszhan Ualkhanov (KAZ)
26 June 2026; 21:00	(18–25, 28–26, 19–25, 21–25); P2 Boxscore			Veer Savarkar Sports Complex; Attendance: 1,021; Referees: Mary Kerekere (NZL), Doszhan Ualkhanov (KAZ)
26 June 2026; 21:00	Scoring leaders			Veer Savarkar Sports Complex; Attendance: 1,021; Referees: Mary Kerekere (NZL), Doszhan Ualkhanov (KAZ)
Landers (14/36)		Total	Sayed (24/59)
D'Arcy (12/24)		Attack	Sayed (20/36)
Landers (4/7)		Block	H. Mohamed (5/12)
Flowerday (1/14)		Serve	Sayed (3/20)
