= 2026 AVC Men's Volleyball Cup Pool B =

Pool B was one of the two pools of the preliminary round of the 2026 AVC Men's Volleyball Cup that took place from 20 to 26 June 2026 at the Veer Savarkar Sports Complex in Ahmedabad, Gujarat, India. The pool consisted of Qatar, South Korea, Indonesia, Thailand, and Oman. Teams competed in a round-robin format with a rest day on 24 June. The top two teams from the pool advanced to the semifinals, while the third-, fourth-, and fifth-placed teams qualified for the classification matches.

South Korea finished first in the pool standings with a record of three wins and one loss, with their sole defeat coming against Thailand. Indonesia secured second place with an identical record of three wins and one loss, having lost only to South Korea. As the top two teams from the pool, they advanced to the semifinals.

== Teams ==
The following five teams competed in Pool B for the tournament, listed by their position in the pool.

Position	Team	Method of qualification	Date of qualification	Appearance(s)				Previous best performance
Position	Team	Method of qualification	Date of qualification	Total	First	Last	Streak	Previous best performance
B1	Qatar (Note: As China, Iran, and Japan were ineligible due to competing in the 2026 FIVB Men's Volleyball Nations League, and with Bahrain qualifying as defending champions, their ranking slots were reallocated to the next highest-ranked teams.)	1st World ranked AVC team	2 February 2026	3rd	2024	2025	3	Champions (2024)
B2	South Korea	2nd World ranked AVC team	2 February 2026	4th	2023	2025	4	3rd place (2023, 2024)
B3	Indonesia	4th World ranked AVC team	2 February 2026	4th	2023	2025	4	6th place (2023, 2025)
B4	Thailand (Note: As Indonesia had already qualified, its slot was reallocated to Thailand.)	2025 SEA V.League runners-up	20 July 2025	4th	2023	2025	4	Champions (2023)
B5	Oman (Note: As Bahrain and Qatar had already qualified, their slots were reallocated to Oman.)	2025 WAVA 3rd placers	2 February 2026	1st	Debut		1	—N/a

== World Rankings ==
The following six teams were ranked in the FIVB World Rankings at the beginning and the final day of the tournament.

Position	Country	FIVB World Rankings	
Position	Country	Before (Note: The FIVB World Ranking before the first game on 20 June 2026.)	After (Note: The FIVB World Ranking after the final game on 28 June 2026.)
B1	Qatar	22 (164.99)	22 (149.81)
B2	South Korea	27 (137.38)	25 (137.22)
B3	Indonesia	52 (78.41)	43 (101.75)
B4	Thailand	61 (63.92)	65 (62.09)
B5	Oman	82 (43.95)	76 (49.38)

== Standings ==
Pos	Team	Pld	W	L	Pts	SW	SL	SR	SPW	SPL	SPR	Qualification
1	South Korea	4	3	1	9	11	6	1.833	380	359	1.058	Semifinals
2	Indonesia	4	3	1	7	9	8	1.125	378	383	0.987	Semifinals
3	Thailand	4	2	2	6	8	9	0.889	368	353	1.042	5th place match
4	Qatar	4	1	3	5	8	9	0.889	382	377	1.013	7th place match
5	Oman	4	1	3	3	7	11	0.636	377	413	0.913	9th place match

Source: Volleyball World
Rules for classification: Pool standing procedure

== Matches ==
All times are Indian Standard Time (UTC+05:30).

=== Qatar vs. Oman ===
This marks the first meeting between Qatar and Oman in the AVC Volleyball Cup, following two consecutive victories by Qatar in their recent matchups at the 2025 WAVA Volleyball Championship.

20 June 2026; 12:00	Qatar	2–3	Oman	Veer Savarkar Sports Complex; Attendance: 500; Referees: Narendrasingh Ripudamansingh Kshatriya (IND), Mary Kerekere (NZL)
20 June 2026; 12:00	(25–19, 25–21, 25–27, 22–25, 13–15); P2 Boxscore			Veer Savarkar Sports Complex; Attendance: 500; Referees: Narendrasingh Ripudamansingh Kshatriya (IND), Mary Kerekere (NZL)
20 June 2026; 12:00	Scoring leaders			Veer Savarkar Sports Complex; Attendance: 500; Referees: Narendrasingh Ripudamansingh Kshatriya (IND), Mary Kerekere (NZL)
Abdallah (19/46)		Total	Majid (26/72)
Abdallah (15/21)		Attack	Majid (26/54)
Belal (5/17)		Block	Saud (5/15)
Youssef (2/19)		Serve	Saleh (2/18)

=== South Korea vs. Thailand ===
This match marks the first meeting between South Korea and Thailand in the AVC Volleyball Cup, following their last encounter at the 2022 Asian Games, where South Korea emerged victorious.

20 June 2026; 18:00	South Korea	2–3	Thailand	Veer Savarkar Sports Complex; Referees: Jaek Passier (AUS), Ahmed Ali Hasan (BHR)
20 June 2026; 18:00	(17–25, 26–24, 25–21, 18–25, 7–15); P2 Boxscore			Veer Savarkar Sports Complex; Referees: Jaek Passier (AUS), Ahmed Ali Hasan (BHR)
20 June 2026; 18:00	Scoring leaders			Veer Savarkar Sports Complex; Referees: Jaek Passier (AUS), Ahmed Ali Hasan (BHR)
Hojin (21/63)		Total	T.Chaiwat (22/65)
Hojin (21/45)		Attack	B.Napadet (19/50)
Youngseok (3/14)		Block	T.Thanathat (6/11)
Hanyong (1/5)		Serve	B.Napadet (1/17)

=== Qatar vs. Thailand ===
This match marks the second AVC Volleyball Cup meeting between the Qatar and Thailand, who last faced each other at the 2022 Asian Games, where Qatar emerged victorious on both tournaments.

21 June 2026; 15:00	Qatar	3–0	Thailand	Veer Savarkar Sports Complex; Attendance: 500; Referees: Lee Kwang-hun (KOR), Jaek Passier (AUS)
21 June 2026; 15:00	(25–23, 25–23, 25–17); P2 Boxscore			Veer Savarkar Sports Complex; Attendance: 500; Referees: Lee Kwang-hun (KOR), Jaek Passier (AUS)
21 June 2026; 15:00	Scoring leaders			Veer Savarkar Sports Complex; Attendance: 500; Referees: Lee Kwang-hun (KOR), Jaek Passier (AUS)
Youssef (17/52)		Total	B.Napadet (21/61)
Youssef (14/32)		Attack	B.Napadet (21/46)
Belal (3/15)		Block	P.Anurak (1/5)
Vasić (2/14)		Serve	B.Thanat (1/3)

=== South Korea vs. Indonesia ===
This match marks the second meeting between South Korea and Indonesia in the AVC Volleyball Cup, following their previous encounter in the 2024 edition, which South Korea won.

21 June 2026; 18:00	South Korea	3–0	Indonesia	Veer Savarkar Sports Complex; Attendance: 750; Referees: Ahmed Ali Hasan (BHR), Chih Hao-chang (TPE)
21 June 2026; 18:00	(25–22, 25–22, 25–21); P2 Boxscore			Veer Savarkar Sports Complex; Attendance: 750; Referees: Ahmed Ali Hasan (BHR), Chih Hao-chang (TPE)
21 June 2026; 18:00	Scoring leaders			Veer Savarkar Sports Complex; Attendance: 750; Referees: Ahmed Ali Hasan (BHR), Chih Hao-chang (TPE)
Hojin (18/44)		Total	Boy (13/43)
Hojin (15/29)		Attack	Farhan (11/23)
Youngseok (1/6)		Block	Boy (2/6)
Hanyong (2/15)		Serve	Boy (1/11)

=== Oman vs. Thailand ===
This match marked the first meeting between Oman and Thailand in the AVC Volleyball Cup, with their last overall matchup occurring at the 2015 Asian Championship, where Thailand won.

22 June 2026; 15:00	Oman	1–3	Thailand	Veer Savarkar Sports Complex; Referees: Agung Purwantoro (INA), Mary Kerekere (NZL)
22 June 2026; 15:00	(25–17, 15–25, 18–25, 20–25); P2 Boxscore			Veer Savarkar Sports Complex; Referees: Agung Purwantoro (INA), Mary Kerekere (NZL)
22 June 2026; 15:00	Scoring leaders			Veer Savarkar Sports Complex; Referees: Agung Purwantoro (INA), Mary Kerekere (NZL)
Majid (17/50)		Total	T.Chaiwat (22/55)
Majid (15/33)		Attack	T.Chaiwat (20/37)
M.Alsaadi (3/7)		Block	P.Anuchit (3/14)
Saud (3/17)		Serve	B.Napadet (2/17)

=== Qatar vs. Indonesia ===
This match marks the second meeting between Qatar and Indonesia in the AVC Men's Volleyball Cup, following their previous encounter in the 2024 edition, which Qatar won.

22 June 2026; 18:00	Qatar	2–3	Indonesia	Veer Savarkar Sports Complex; Attendance: 1,200; Referees: Jatuporn Kittichaisombat (THA), Doszhan Ualkhanov (KAZ)
22 June 2026; 18:00	(25–14, 22–25, 30–32, 27–25, 1–15); P2 Boxscore			Veer Savarkar Sports Complex; Attendance: 1,200; Referees: Jatuporn Kittichaisombat (THA), Doszhan Ualkhanov (KAZ)
22 June 2026; 18:00	Scoring leaders			Veer Savarkar Sports Complex; Attendance: 1,200; Referees: Jatuporn Kittichaisombat (THA), Doszhan Ualkhanov (KAZ)
Nikola (16/57)		Total	Nibras (32/85)
Nikola (14/32)		Attack	Nibras (28/50)
Belal (9/34)		Block	Gumilar (3/10)
Renan (1/20)		Serve	Farhan (2/24)

=== Indonesia vs. Thailand ===
This was the third meeting between Indonesia and Thailand in the AVC Volleyball Cup—following Thailand victory in their first encounter—though Indonesia won their most recent matchup at the 2025 SEA V.League.

23 June 2026; 18:00	Indonesia	3–2	Thailand	Veer Savarkar Sports Complex; Attendance: 550; Referees: Fahad Mohammed I A Alawadhi (QAT), Jaek Passier (AUS)
23 June 2026; 18:00	(19–25, 25–19, 25–22, 23–25, 15–12); P2 Boxscore			Veer Savarkar Sports Complex; Attendance: 550; Referees: Fahad Mohammed I A Alawadhi (QAT), Jaek Passier (AUS)
23 June 2026; 18:00	Scoring leaders			Veer Savarkar Sports Complex; Attendance: 550; Referees: Fahad Mohammed I A Alawadhi (QAT), Jaek Passier (AUS)
Boy (25/72)		Total	B.Napadet (33/72)
Boy (24/48)		Attack	B.Napadet (28/52)
Hendra (2/11)		Block	P.Anuchit (6/18)
Farhan (6/24)		Serve	B.Napadet (1/13)

=== Oman vs. South Korea ===
This match marks the first meeting between Oman and South Korea in the AVC Men's Volleyball Cup, following their last encounter at the 2015 Asian Championship, which South Korea won.

25 June 2026; 12:00	Oman	2–3	South Korea	Veer Savarkar Sports Complex; Attendance: 110; Referees: Ali Hasan Ahmed (BHR), Mary Kerekere (NZL)
25 June 2026; 12:00	(25–23, 23–25, 13–25, 28–26, 15–17); P2 Boxscore			Veer Savarkar Sports Complex; Attendance: 110; Referees: Ali Hasan Ahmed (BHR), Mary Kerekere (NZL)
25 June 2026; 12:00	Scoring leaders			Veer Savarkar Sports Complex; Attendance: 110; Referees: Ali Hasan Ahmed (BHR), Mary Kerekere (NZL)
Saud (20/65)		Total	Hanyong (22/65)
Saud (17/32)		Attack	Hanyong (19/38)
Hamid (4/11)		Block	Changseong (3/16)
Saud (2/17)		Serve	Taekeui (2/21)

=== Qatar vs. South Korea ===
This marked the third consecutive AVC Volleyball Cup meeting between Qatar and South Korea, with each team having previously traded victories.

26 June 2026; 15:00	Qatar	1–3	South Korea	Veer Savarkar Sports Complex; Attendance: 500; Referees: Jaek Passier (AUS), Chi Hao-chang (TPE)
26 June 2026; 15:00	(16–25, 25–21, 21–25, 18–25); P2 Boxscore			Veer Savarkar Sports Complex; Attendance: 500; Referees: Jaek Passier (AUS), Chi Hao-chang (TPE)
26 June 2026; 15:00	Scoring leaders			Veer Savarkar Sports Complex; Attendance: 500; Referees: Jaek Passier (AUS), Chi Hao-chang (TPE)
Abdallah (15/48)		Total	Hojin (21/64)
Abdallah (11/19)		Attack	Hojin (19/42)
Belal (4/17)		Block	Jaeyoung (2/7)
Nikola (1/15)		Serve	Hanyong (3/20)

=== Indonesia vs. Oman ===
This match marked the first meeting between Indonesia and Oman in an AVC-sanctioned tournament.

26 June 2026; 18:00	Indonesia	3–1	Oman	Veer Savarkar Sports Complex; Attendance: 1000; Referees: Narendrasingh Ripudamansingh Kshatriya (IND), Fahad Mohammed I A Alawadhi (QAT)
26 June 2026; 18:00	(25–23, 20–25, 25–19, 25–21); P2 Boxscore			Veer Savarkar Sports Complex; Attendance: 1000; Referees: Narendrasingh Ripudamansingh Kshatriya (IND), Fahad Mohammed I A Alawadhi (QAT)
26 June 2026; 18:00	Scoring leaders			Veer Savarkar Sports Complex; Attendance: 1000; Referees: Narendrasingh Ripudamansingh Kshatriya (IND), Fahad Mohammed I A Alawadhi (QAT)
Farhan (22/58)		Total	Majid (21/63)
Farhan (18/32)		Attack	Majid (18/41)
Hendra (2/9)		Block	Saud (2/8)
Farhan (3/19)		Serve	Saud (1/12)
