= 2026 AVC Men's Volleyball Cup =

Asian men's volleyball tournament

- Official logo

Tournament details
- Host country: India
- City: Ahmedabad
- Dates: 20–28 June
- Teams: 11 (from 1 confederation)
- Venue: 1 (in 1 host city)

Final positions
- Champions: Indonesia (1st title)
- Runners-up: South Korea
- Third place: India
- Fourth place: Bahrain

Tournament awards
- MVP: (Indonesia) Boy Arnez Arabi
- Best Setter: (Indonesia) Alfin Daniel Pratama
- Best OH: (Indonesia) Boy Arnez Arabi; (South Korea) Jeong Han-yong
- Best MB: (Indonesia) Hendra Kurniawan; (South Korea) Park Chang-seong
- Best OPP: (South Korea) Shin Ho-jin
- Best Libero: (India) Anand Kottarathil

Tournament statistics
- Matches played: 32
- Attendance: 37,681 (1,178 per match)

The 2026 AVC Men's Volleyball Cup was the sixth edition of the AVC Men's Volleyball Cup, an annual international volleyball tournament organized by the Asian Volleyball Confederation (AVC). It is the first edition of the tournament since its rebranding from the AVC Men's Challenge Cup. The event was organized in cooperation with a steering committee appointed by the Fédération Internationale de Volleyball (FIVB), following the suspension of the Volleyball Federation of India (VFI). The tournament was held from 20 to 28 June 2026 in Ahmedabad, Gujarat, marking the first time India has hosted the event.

Indonesia won the tournament by defeating South Korea in the final, marking Indonesia's first medal in the competition's history. South Korea's runner-up finish was their first silver medal at the tournament. Host nation India defeated defending champions Bahrain in the third-place match to win the bronze medal, which was India's first podium finish at the event. Indonesia's Boy Arnez Arabi was named the tournament's MVP while Vladislav Mastikhin of Kazakhstan finished as the tournament's top scorer with a total of 126 points.

== Host selection ==
India was selected to host the 2026 AVC Men's Volleyball Nations Cup after AVC unveiled its 2026 calendar in December 2025. Ahmedabad was named the host city of the tournament with games to be held at the Veer Savarkar Sports Complex.

== Teams ==
=== Qualification ===
List of teams: Participating teams in the 2026 FIVB Volleyball Nations League Participating teams in the 2026 AVC Volleyball Cup Team withdrawn Did not qualify

A total of 12 teams were selected for the AVC Men's Volleyball Cup based on specific qualification criteria. This included one slot reserved for the host country and another for the defending champions from the previous edition, with the runner-up taking the spot if the defending champion happened to be the host nation. Additionally, five teams were selected based on the highest FIVB World Rankings among those that had not yet qualified. The remaining five slots were awarded to teams from zonal representatives that had not qualified for the tournament. Furthermore, any teams competing in the FIVB Men's Volleyball Nations League were strictly ineligible to submit entries to this tournament.

Team	Method of qualification	Date of qualification	Appearance(s)				Previous best performance
Team	Method of qualification	Date of qualification	Total	First	Last	Streak	Previous best performance
India	Hosts	20 December 2025	2nd	2023	2023	1	15th place (2023)
Kazakhstan (Note: As India and Pakistan had already qualified, their slots were reallocated to Kazakhstan.)	2025 CAVA 4th placers	4 June 2025	3rd	2023	2024	1	4th place (2024)
Bahrain	Defending champions	24 June 2025	4th	2023	2025	4	Champions (2025)
Thailand (Note: As Indonesia had already qualified, its slot was reallocated to Thailand.)	2025 SEA V.League runners-up	20 July 2025	4th	2023	2025	4	Champions (2023)
Oman (Note: As Bahrain and Qatar had already qualified, their slots were reallocated to Oman.)	2025 WAVA 3rd placers	26 July 2025	1st	Debut		1	—N/a
Chinese Taipei (Note: As South Korea had already qualified, its slot was reallocated to Chinese Taipei.)	2025 EAVA runners-up	23 August 2025	4th	2023	2025	4	7th place (2025)
New Zealand	2025 OZVA runners-up	23 December 2025	2nd	2025	2025	2	11th place (2025)
Qatar (Note: As China, Iran, and Japan were ineligible due to competing in the 2026 FIVB Men's Volleyball Nations League, and with Bahrain qualifying as defending champions, their ranking slots were reallocated to the next highest-ranked teams.)	1st World ranked AVC team	2 February 2026	3rd	2024	2025	3	Champions (2024)
South Korea	2nd World ranked AVC team	2 February 2026	4th	2023	2025	4	3rd place (2023, 2024)
Australia	3rd World ranked AVC team	2 February 2026	4th	2023	2025	4	5th place (2023, 2025)
~~Pakistan~~ (Note: Pakistan has withdrawn from the tournament due to the Pakistani government's refusal to grant travel permits. AVC has appointed Turkmenistan as its replacement. However, Turkmenistan has also withdrawn from participation.)	~~4th World ranked AVC team~~	~~2 February 2026~~	~~3rd~~	~~2024~~	~~2025~~	~~3~~	~~Runners-up (2024, 2025)~~
Indonesia	5th World ranked AVC team	2 February 2026	4th	2023	2025	4	6th place (2023, 2025)

=== Seeding ===
Seeded teams	Pot 1	Pot 2	Pot 3
India (58) (Hosts); Qatar (21); South Korea (26); Australia (33); Bahrain (40); ~~Pakistan (44)~~	Indonesia (51); Chinese Taipei (53)	Thailand (59); Kazakhstan (60)	Oman (76); New Zealand (82)

=== Draw results ===
The draw of lots took place on 10 April 2026 in Ahmedabad, Gujarat, India led by AVC President Ramon Suzara, with Nilofer Shaikh, assistant director of the Sports Authority of Gujarat. Teams were split into two pools with six teams each.

External videos
- [ LIVE ] Drawing of Lots : AVC Men's Cup Amdavad 2026

Pool A
Pos	Team
A1	India
A2	Australia
A3	Bahrain
A4	Chinese Taipei
A5	Kazakhstan
A6	New Zealand

Pool B
Pos	Team
B1	Qatar
B2	South Korea
B3	~~Pakistan~~
B4	Indonesia
B5	Thailand
B7	Oman

== Venue ==
Ahmedabad, India
Veer Savarkar Sports Complex
Capacity: 5,000
Location map of the host venue

== Pool standing procedure ==
1. Total number of victories (matches won, matches lost)
2. In the event of a tie, the following first tiebreaker will apply: The teams will be ranked by the most point gained per match as follows:
  - Match won 3–0 or 3–1: 3 points for the winner, 0 points for the loser
  - Match won 3–2: 2 points for the winner, 1 point for the loser
  - Match forfeited: 3 points for the winner, 0 points (0–25, 0–25, 0–25) for the loser
3. If teams are still tied after examining the number of victories and points gained, then the AVC will examine the results in order to break the tie in the following order:
  - Set quotient: if two or more teams are tied on the number of points gained, they will be ranked by the quotient resulting from the division of the number of all set won by the number of all sets lost.
  - Points quotient: if the tie persists based on the set quotient, the teams will be ranked by the quotient resulting from the division of all points scored by the total of points lost during all sets.
  - If the tie persists based on the point quotient, the tie will be broken based on the team that won the match of the Round Robin Phase between the tied teams. When the tie in point quotient is between three or more teams, these teams ranked taking into consideration only the matches involving the teams in question.

== Preliminary round ==
- All times are Indian Standard Time (UTC+05:30).

=== Pool A ===
Pos	Team	Pld	W	L	Pts	SW	SL	SR	SPW	SPL	SPR	Qualification
1	India (H)	5	5	0	15	15	1	15.000	403	317	1.271	Semifinals
2	Bahrain	5	4	1	12	12	6	2.000	429	392	1.094	Semifinals
3	Kazakhstan	5	3	2	8	10	10	1.000	441	467	0.944	5th place match
4	Chinese Taipei	5	2	3	6	9	10	0.900	434	443	0.980	7th place match
5	New Zealand	5	1	4	2	4	14	0.286	376	443	0.849	9th place match
6	Australia	5	0	5	2	6	15	0.400	466	487	0.957	

Source: Volleyball World
Rules for classification: Pool standing procedure
(H) Host

Date	Time		Score		Set 1	Set 2	Set 3	Set 4	Set 5	Total	Attd	Report
20 Jun	15:00	Bahrain	3–1	Chinese Taipei	22–25	25–23	25–22	25–20		97–90	615	P2 Boxscore
20 Jun	21:00	India	3–0	New Zealand	25–23	25–19	25–14			75–56	2,500	P2 Boxscore
21 Jun	09:00	Australia	1–3	Chinese Taipei	23–25	22–25	25–23	19–25		89–98	200	P2 Boxscore
21 Jun	12:00	New Zealand	0–3	Bahrain	19–25	21–25	16–25			56–75	150	P2 Boxscore
21 Jun	21:00	India	3–0	Kazakhstan	25–16	25–21	25–15			75–52	5,000	P2 Boxscore
22 Jun	12:00	Australia	2–3	Kazakhstan	25–15	25–21	23–25	24–26	14–16	111–103	279	P2 Boxscore
22 Jun	21:00	India	3–1	Chinese Taipei	22–25	25–14	25–22	25–22		97–83	2,500	P2 Boxscore
23 Jun	12:00	New Zealand	3–2	Australia	16–25	25–23	27–25	19–25	17–15	104–113	350	P2 Boxscore
23 Jun	15:00	Chinese Taipei	1–3	Kazakhstan	25–20	24–26	16–25	23–25		88–96	350	P2 Boxscore
23 Jun	21:00	India	3–0	Bahrain	25–21	25–16	25–22			75–59	2,500	P2 Boxscore
25 Jun	15:00	Chinese Taipei	3–0	New Zealand	25–19	25–23	25–22			75–64	550	P2 Boxscore
25 Jun	18:00	Bahrain	3–1	Kazakhstan	22–25	25–23	25–17	25–20		97–85	2,152	P2 Boxscore
25 Jun	21:00	India	3–0	Australia	26–24	25–14	30–28			81–66	2,855	P2 Boxscore
26 Jun	12:00	New Zealand	1–3	Kazakhstan	21–25	19–25	25–22	31–33		96–105	315	P2 Boxscore
26 Jun	21:00	Australia	1–3	Bahrain	18–25	28–26	19–25	21–25		86–101	1,021	P2 Boxscore

=== Pool B ===
Pos	Team	Pld	W	L	Pts	SW	SL	SR	SPW	SPL	SPR	Qualification
1	South Korea	4	3	1	9	11	6	1.833	380	359	1.058	Semifinals
2	Indonesia	4	3	1	7	9	8	1.125	378	383	0.987	Semifinals
3	Thailand	4	2	2	6	8	9	0.889	368	353	1.042	5th place match
4	Qatar	4	1	3	5	8	9	0.889	382	377	1.013	7th place match
5	Oman	4	1	3	3	7	11	0.636	377	413	0.913	9th place match

Source: Volleyball World
Rules for classification: Pool standing procedure

Date	Time		Score		Set 1	Set 2	Set 3	Set 4	Set 5	Total	Attd	Report
20 Jun	12:00	Qatar	2–3	Oman	25–19	25–21	25–27	22–25	13–15	110–107	500	P2 Boxscore
20 Jun	18:30	South Korea	2–3	Thailand	17–25	26–24	25–21	18–25	7–15	93–110		P2 Boxscore
21 Jun	15:00	Qatar	3–0	Thailand	25–23	25–23	25–17			75–63	500	P2 Boxscore
21 Jun	18:00	South Korea	3–0	Indonesia	25–22	25–22	25–21			75–65	750	P2 Boxscore
22 Jun	15:00	Oman	1–3	Thailand	25–17	15–25	18–25	20–25		78–92		P2 Boxscore
22 Jun	18:00	Qatar	2–3	Indonesia	25–14	22–25	30–32	27–25	13–15	117–111	1,200	P2 Boxscore
23 Jun	18:00	Indonesia	3–2	Thailand	19–25	25–19	25–22	23–25	15–12	107–103	550	P2 Boxscore
25 Jun	12:00	Oman	2–3	South Korea	25–23	23–25	13–25	28–26	15–17	104–116	110	P2 Boxscore
26 Jun	15:00	Qatar	1–3	South Korea	16–25	25–21	21–25	18–25		80–96	500	P2 Boxscore
26 Jun	18:00	Indonesia	3–1	Oman	25–23	20–25	25–19	25–21		95–88	1,000	P2 Boxscore

== Final round ==
- All times are Indian Standard Time (UTC+05:30).

=== 9th place match ===
Date	Time		Score		Set 1	Set 2	Set 3	Set 4	Set 5	Total	Attd	Report
27 Jun	12:30	New Zealand	0–3	Oman	20–25	21–25	18–25			59–75	890	P2 Boxscore

=== 7th place match ===
Date	Time		Score		Set 1	Set 2	Set 3	Set 4	Set 5	Total	Attd	Report
28 Jun	09:30	Chinese Taipei	1–3	Qatar	30–32	25–22	18–25	15–25		88–104	594	P2 Boxscore

=== 5th place match ===
Date	Time		Score		Set 1	Set 2	Set 3	Set 4	Set 5	Total	Attd	Report
28 Jun	12:30	Kazakhstan	3–1	Thailand	25–21	25–23	22–25	27–25		99–94	1,000	P2 Boxscore

=== Final four ===
Semifinals
27 June
South Korea	3
Bahrain	1
27 June
India	2
Indonesia	3

Final
28 June
South Korea	0
Indonesia	3
3rd place match
28 June
Bahrain	1
India	3

==== Semifinals ====
Date	Time		Score		Set 1	Set 2	Set 3	Set 4	Set 5	Total	Attd	Report
27 Jun	15:30	South Korea	3–1	Bahrain	25–23	25–22	23–25	25–20		98–90	2,000	P2 Boxscore
27 Jun	19:00	India	2–3	Indonesia	25–15	24–26	20–25	25–19	13–15	107–100	2,750	P2 Boxscore

==== 3rd place match ====
Date	Time		Score		Set 1	Set 2	Set 3	Set 4	Set 5	Total	Attd	Report
28 Jun	15:30	Bahrain	1–3	India	23–25	25–23	21–25	17–25		86–98	2,500	P2 Boxscore

==== Final ====
Date	Time		Score		Set 1	Set 2	Set 3	Set 4	Set 5	Total	Attd	Report
28 Jun	19:00	South Korea	0–3	Indonesia	32–34	16–25	23–25			71–84	1,500	P2 Boxscore

== Final standing ==
Pos	Team	Pld	W	L	Pts	SW	SL	SR	SPW	SPL	SPR	Qualification
1st place, gold medalist(s)	Indonesia	6	5	1	12	15	10	1.500	562	561	1.002	Qualified for the 2027 AVC Cup
2nd place, silver medalist(s)	South Korea	6	4	2	12	14	10	1.400	549	533	1.030	
3rd place, bronze medalist(s)	India (H)	7	6	1	19	20	5	4.000	608	503	1.209	
4	Bahrain	7	4	3	12	14	12	1.167	605	588	1.029	
5	Kazakhstan	6	4	2	11	13	11	1.182	540	561	0.963	
6	Thailand	5	2	3	6	9	12	0.750	462	452	1.022	
7	Qatar	5	2	3	8	11	10	1.100	486	465	1.045	
8	Chinese Taipei	6	2	4	6	10	13	0.769	522	547	0.954	
9	Oman	5	2	3	6	10	11	0.909	452	472	0.958	
10	New Zealand	6	1	5	2	4	17	0.235	435	518	0.840	
11	Australia	5	0	5	2	6	15	0.400	466	487	0.957	

Source: Volleyball World
(H) Host

== Awards ==
2026 AVC Men's Volleyball Cup champions

Indonesia
First title

The following individual awards were presented at the conclusion of the tournament:

- Most valuable player
  (Indonesia) Boy Arnez Arabi
- Best setter
  (Indonesia) Alfin Daniel Pratama
- Best outside spikers
  (Indonesia) Boy Arnez Arabi
  (South Korea) Jeong Han-yong
- Best middle blockers
  (Indonesia) Hendra Kurniawan
  (South Korea) Park Chang-seong
- Best opposite spiker
  (South Korea) Shin Ho-jin
- Best libero
  (India) Anand Kottarathil

== See also ==
- 2026 Men's European Volleyball League
- 2026 Copa Sudamericana
- 2026 AVC Men's Volleyball Continental Championship
- 2026 AVC Boys' U18 Volleyball Championship
