= Volleyball at the 2011 Arab Games – Men's tournament =

The men's volleyball tournament at the 2011 Pan Arab Games was held in Doha, Qatar, from December 10 to 21, 2011. In this men's tournament 11 teams participated.

== Preliminary round ==
=== Group A ===
Pos	Team	Pld	W	L	Pts	SPW	SPL	SPR	SW	SL	SR
1	Qatar	4	4	0	8	328	250	1.312	12	1	12.000
2	Kuwait	4	3	1	7	371	341	1.088	10	6	1.667
3	Oman	4	2	2	6	333	310	1.074	8	7	1.143
4	Saudi Arabia	4	1	3	5	203	215	0.944	5	9	0.556
5	Palestine	4	0	4	4	181	300	0.603	0	12	0.000

Date	Time		Score		Set 1	Set 2	Set 3	Set 4	Set 5	Total
10 Dec	19:00	Qatar	3–0	Palestine	25–10	25–12	25–14			75–36
12 Dec	17:00	Oman	2–3	Kuwait	23–25	25–15	30–28	15–25	11–15	104–108
12 Dec	19:00	Qatar	3–0	Saudi Arabia	25-17	25-23	25-21			75-61
13 Dec	19:00	Palestine	0–3	Oman	12–25	13–25	15–25			40–75
14 Dec	17:00	Palestine	0–3	Saudi Arabia	14–25	15–25	22–25			51–75
14 Dec	19:00	Kuwait	1–3	Qatar	22–25	26–24	27–29	16–25		91–103
15 Dec	19:00	Saudi Arabia	1–3	Oman	18–25	23–25	25–17	21–25		87–92
16 Dec	17:00	Kuwait	3–0	Palestine	25–15	25–22	25–17			75–54
16 Dec	19:00	Oman	0–3	Qatar	23–25	19–25	20–25			62–75
17 Dec	19:00	Saudi Arabia	1–3	Kuwait	15-25	19-25	25-22	21-25		80-97

=== Group B ===
Pos	Team	Pld	W	L	Pts	SPW	SPL	SPR	SW	SL	SR
1	Egypt	5	5	0	10	421	300	1.403	15	1	15.000
2	Algeria	5	4	1	9	349	284	1.229	12	3	4.000
3	Bahrain	5	3	2	8	375	346	1.084	10	6	1.667
4	Jordan	5	2	3	7	355	388	0.915	6	11	0.545
5	Iraq	5	1	4	6	344	438	0.785	5	14	0.357
6	Sudan	5	0	5	5	336	424	0.792	3	15	0.200

Date	Time		Score		Set 1	Set 2	Set 3	Set 4	Set 5	Total
10 Dec	13:15	Bahrain	3–0	Iraq	25–16	25–18	25–20			75–54
10 Dec	15:00	Egypt	3–1	Sudan	25–15	23–25	25–12	25–17		98–69
10 Dec	17:00	Algeria	3–0	Jordan	25–23	25–22	25–17			75–62
11 Dec	15:00	Iraq	2–3	Jordan	25–19	25–18	21–25	14–25	19–21	104–108
11 Dec	17:00	Sudan	0–3	Algeria	20–25	15–25	11–25			46–75
11 Dec	19:00	Bahrain	1–3	Egypt	23–25	25–23	19–25	23–25		90–98
13 Dec	13:00	Egypt	3–0	Iraq	25-13	25–15	25–16			75–44
13 Dec	15:00	Algeria	3–0	Bahrain	25-22	25–19	25–18			75–59
13 Dec	17:00	Jordan	3–0	Sudan	25–19	25–18	25–22			75–59
15 Dec	13:00	Iraq	3–2	Sudan	25–22	25–19	15–25	19–25	16–14	100–105
15 Dec	15:00	Bahrain	3–0	Jordan	25–20	25–23	25–19			75–62
15 Dec	17:00	Egypt	3–0	Algeria	25–16	25–11	25–22			75–49
17 Dec	13:00	Algeria	3-0	Iraq	25-12	25-16	25-14			75-42
17 Dec	15:00	Jordan	0–3	Egypt	13-25	17-25	18-25			48-75
17 Dec	17:00	Sudan	0–3	Bahrain	24-26	14-25	19-25			57-76

==== Final round ====
Semifinal
December 19
Kuwait	0
Egypt	3
December 19
Algeria	0
Qatar	3

Gold medal game
December 22
Egypt	3
Qatar	0
Bronze medal game
December 22
Kuwait	0
Algeria	3

===== Placement 9th–10th =====
Date	Time		Score		Set 1	Set 2	Set 3	Set 4	Set 5	Total
19 Dec	13:00	Palestine	0–3	Iraq	0–25	0–25	0–25			0–75

===== Placement 7th–8th =====
Date	Time		Score		Set 1	Set 2	Set 3	Set 4	Set 5	Total
19 Dec	15:00	Saudi Arabia	3–0	Jordan	25-22	25–19	25–18			75–59

===== Semifinals =====
Date	Time		Score		Set 1	Set 2	Set 3	Set 4	Set 5	Total
19 Dec	17:00	Kuwait	0–3	Egypt	22-25	22-25	18-25			62–75
19 Dec	19:00	Algeria	0–3	Qatar	20-25	21-25	20-25			61–75

===== Placement 5th–6th =====
Date	Time		Score		Set 1	Set 2	Set 3	Set 4	Set 5	Total
22 Dec	15:00	Oman	0–3	Bahrain	14-25	21-25	21-25			56–75

===== Bronze medal match =====
Date	Time		Score		Set 1	Set 2	Set 3	Set 4	Set 5	Total
22 Dec	17:00	Kuwait	0–3	Algeria	23–25	17–25	24–26			64–76

===== Gold medal match =====
Date	Time		Score		Set 1	Set 2	Set 3	Set 4	Set 5	Total
22 Dec	19:00	Egypt	3–0	Qatar	25–20	25–20	25–10			75–50

==== Final standing ====
Rank	Team
1st place, gold medalist(s)	Egypt
2nd place, silver medalist(s)	Qatar
3rd place, bronze medalist(s)	Algeria
4	Kuwait
5	Bahrain
6	Oman
7	Saudi Arabia
8	Jordan
9	Iraq
10	Palestine
11	Sudan
