= Murad Jehan =

Pakistani volleyball player (born 1994)

Personal information
- Nationality: Pakistani
- Born: 21 August 1994 (age 32); Bannu, Khyber Pakhtunkhwa, Pakistan
- Height: 199 cm (6 ft 6 in)
- Weight: 88
- Spike: 350 cm (138 in)
- Block: 322 cm (127 in)
Honours
Volleyball
Representing Pakistan
Asian Games
Bronze medal – third place	2026 Aichi-Nagoya	Team
CAVA Championship
Gold medal – first place	2026 Islamabad	Team
Gold medal – first place	2024 Islamabad	Team
Gold medal – first place	2022 Lahore	Team
Bronze medal – third place	2025 Fergana	Team
AVC Nations Cup
Silver medal – second place	2024 Isa Town	Team
Silver medal – second place	2025 Manama	Team
- Last updated: 17 May 2024

Murad Jehan (Pashto: مراد جهان; Urdu: مراد جہان; born August 1994) is a Pakistani professional volleyball player who serves as the captain of the Pakistan men's national volleyball team. Under his captaincy, Pakistan won the 2024 CAVA Nations League title, defeating Turkmenistan 3-1 in the final. He led the team to a historic 3-0 whitewash victory over Australia in a home series in 2024. Jehan has captained Pakistan to consecutive AVC Men's Challenge Cup and Nations Cup finals, securing silver medals in both 2024 and 2025. In the 2024 AVC Challenge Cup, he was named Best Opposite Hitter. In 2026, he captained Pakistan to the CAVA Men's Volleyball Championship title, defeating Bangladesh in the final, and was named the tournament's Most Valuable Player and selected to the CAVA Dream Team. He also led Pakistan to a historic bronze medal at the 2026 Asian Games, ending a 64-year medal drought for Pakistan volleyball. He plays professionally for clubs across Lebanon, Iraq, Maldives, Oman, Jordan, and Bahrain, and represents WAPDA in Pakistan. He is a gold medalist at the Punjab Gold Cup Volleyball Tournament and a bronze medalist at the Asian Club Championship with WAPDA.

== Career ==
Murad's professional journey extends beyond domestic competitions. He has played for Sohar Club in the Oman Volleyball League and has experience in leagues in the UAE, Lebanon, and the Maldives. His international exposure has honed his skills and brought valuable experience to the Pakistani volleyball scene.

Murad has also been a vocal advocate for the establishment of a professional volleyball league in Pakistan, emphasizing its importance for the development of the sport and the financial stability of the players. He believes that consistent competition and the presence of foreign players in a professional league would greatly benefit the local talent and overall standards of the sport in the country.

== Personal life ==
Murad hails from Bannu District of Khyber Pakhtunkhwa born to Umer Ayaz Khan. Despite his success on the volleyball court, he faces challenges due to the lack of adequate training facilities in his hometown and across Pakistan. He has highlighted the need for proper indoor facilities and quality equipment to help athletes prepare effectively for international competitions.
