= 2025 AVC Men's Volleyball Nations Cup =

Asian men's volleyball tournament

أمم آسيا لرجال الطائرة
- Official logo

Tournament details
- Host country: Bahrain
- City: Manama
- Dates: 17–24 June
- Teams: 11 (from 1 confederation)
- Venue: 1 (in 1 host city)

Final positions
- Champions: Bahrain (1st title)
- Runners-up: Pakistan
- Third place: Qatar
- Fourth place: South Korea

Tournament awards
- MVP: (Bahrain) Mohamed Abdulla Yaqoob
- Best Setter: (Bahrain) Mahmood Alafyah
- Best OH: (Bahrain) Mohamed Abdulla Yaqoob; (Pakistan) Murad Jehan
- Best MB: (Pakistan) Musawer Khan; (Qatar) Belal Nabel Abunabot
- Best OPP: (Bahrain) Ali Khamis
- Best Libero: (Bahrain) Ayman Haroon

Tournament statistics
- Matches played: 25
- Attendance: 20,585 (823 per match)

The 2025 AVC Men's Volleyball Nations Cup was the first and final edition under this name, and the fifth overall edition of the tournament formerly known as the AVC Men's Challenge Cup, an annual international volleyball tournament organised by the Asian Volleyball Confederation (AVC) with Bahrain Volleyball Association (BVA). It was held from 17 to 24 June 2025 in Manama, Bahrain.

As the FIVB Volleyball Nations League restructured its format and abolished the Challenger Cup as a direct qualifier to the tournament, this tournament will serve to countries currently not participating in the Nations League to garner world ranking points for a chance to enter the said competition. Bahrain, the champions of this tournament qualified for the 2026 Asian Championship.

Host Bahrain won their first title after defeating the Pakistan in the final. This was Pakistan's second consecutive defeat in the final of the tournament. Qatar beat South Korea in the 3rd place match and took the bronze medal. Mohamed Abdulla Yaqoob was named as the MVP of the tournament.

Suspension of the final match was considered due to security issues arising from the Iranian strikes on Al Udeid Air Base. However the plan was dropped after guarantees from the host country's government and federation.

== Host selection ==
Bahrain is the only country that submitted its bid to host the tournament and AVC was awarded the hosting rights in February 2025.

== Qualification ==
List of teams: Participating in the 2025 FIVB Nations League Participating in the 2025 AVC Nations Cup Did not participate

Following AVC regulations, a maximum of 12 teams for the next AVC Nations Cup were selected through the following criteria:

- 1 team for the host country
- 6 other top-ranked teams from the previous edition (2024)
- 5 other highest-ranked entrant teams in the FIVB Senior World Rankings
  - If a team does not have world ranking points, the final decision will be made by AVC in consultation with Volleyball World and the host country.

Country	Zone	Qualified as	Qualified on	Previous appearances			Previous best performance
Country	Zone	Qualified as	Qualified on	Total	First	Last	Previous best performance
Bahrain (Note: As China qualified for the 2025 Nations League on 7 July 2024, Bahrain qualified as the 2024 Challenge Cup 7th placers. Their spot was allocated to Australia after being awarded hosting rights on 15 April 2025.)	WAVA	Host country	15 April 2025	2	2023	2024	Runners-up (2023)
Qatar	WAVA	Defending champions	8 June 2024	1	2024		Champions (2024)
Pakistan	CAVA	2024 Challenge Cup runners-up	8 June 2024	1	2024		Runners-up (2024)
South Korea	EAVA	2024 Challenge Cup 3rd placers	8 June 2024	2	2023	2024	3rd place (2023, 2024)
~~Kazakhstan~~ (Note: Kazakhstan withdrew from tournament on 14 June 2025 due Security concerns regarding to Twelve-Day War.)	~~CAVA~~	~~2024 Challenge Cup 4th placers~~	~~8 June 2024~~	~~2~~	~~2023~~	~~2024~~	~~4th place (2024)~~
Vietnam	SAVA	2024 Challenge Cup 6th placers	8 June 2024	2	2023	2024	4th place (2023)
Australia	OZVA	2024 Challenge Cup 8th placers	15 April 2025	2	2023	2024	5th place (2023)
Chinese Taipei	EAVA	1st World ranked non-qualified team	15 April 2025	2	2023	2024	9th place (2023)
Indonesia	SAVA	2nd World ranked non-qualified team	15 April 2025	2	2023	2024	6th place (2023)
Philippines	SAVA	3rd World ranked non-qualified team	15 April 2025	2	2023	2024	10th place (2023, 2024)
Thailand	SAVA	4th World ranked non-qualified team	15 April 2025	2	2023	2024	Champions (2023)
New Zealand	OZVA	Additional entrant team	19 May 2025	0	None		Debut

China, Iran, and Japan which are part of the 2025 FIVB Men's Volleyball Nations League are ineligible to submit entries to this tournament.

== Pools composition ==
The draw of lots took place on 25 May 2025 at the Edsa Shangri-La, Manila in Mandaluyong, Philippines and teams were split into four pools with three teams each.

Seeded teams	Pot 1	Pot 2
Bahrain (58) (Hosts); Qatar (21) (1st); Pakistan (46) (2nd); South Korea (27) (3rd)	Australia (33); Chinese Taipei (45); Indonesia (51); Vietnam (52)	Kazakhstan (53); Philippines (56); Thailand (57); New Zealand (–)

Drawing results

Pool A	Pool B	Pool C	Pool D
Bahrain	Qatar	Pakistan	South Korea
Indonesia	Australia	Chinese Taipei	Vietnam
Thailand	~~Kazakhstan~~	Philippines	New Zealand

== Venue ==
Manama, Bahrain
Isa Bin Rashed Hall
Capacity: 10,500

== Pool standing procedure ==
1. Total number of victories (matches won, matches lost)
2. In the event of a tie, the following first tiebreaker will apply: The teams will be ranked by the most point gained per match as follows:
  - Match won 3–0 or 3–1: 3 points for the winner, 0 points for the loser
  - Match won 3–2: 2 points for the winner, 1 point for the loser
  - Match forfeited: 3 points for the winner, 0 points (0–25, 0–25, 0–25) for the loser
3. If teams are still tied after examining the number of victories and points gained, then the AVC will examine the results in order to break the tie in the following order:
  - Set quotient: if two or more teams are tied on the number of points gained, they will be ranked by the quotient resulting from the division of the number of all set won by the number of all sets lost.
  - Points quotient: if the tie persists based on the set quotient, the teams will be ranked by the quotient resulting from the division of all points scored by the total of points lost during all sets.
  - If the tie persists based on the point quotient, the tie will be broken based on the team that won the match of the Round Robin Phase between the tied teams. When the tie in point quotient is between three or more teams, these teams ranked taking into consideration only the matches involving the teams in question.

== Preliminary round ==
- All times are Arabia Standard Time (UTC+03:00).

=== Pool A ===
Pos	Team	Pld	W	L	Pts	SW	SL	SR	SPW	SPL	SPR	Qualification
1	Bahrain (H)	2	2	0	6	6	1	6.000	173	147	1.177	Quarterfinals
2	Indonesia	2	1	1	2	3	5	0.600	169	177	0.955	Quarterfinals
3	Thailand	2	0	2	1	3	6	0.500	187	205	0.912	9th–11th places

Source: FIVB Live Center
(H) Host

Date	Time		Score		Set 1	Set 2	Set 3	Set 4	Set 5	Total	Report
17 Jun	19:00	Bahrain	3–1	Thailand	25–21	21–25	25–19	25–22		96–87	P2 Report
18 Jun	19:00	Indonesia	3–2	Thailand	22–25	22–25	25–19	25–23	15–8	109–100	P2 Report
19 Jun	19:00	Bahrain	3–0	Indonesia	25–13	27–25	25–22			77–60	P2 Report

=== Pool B ===
Pos	Team	Pld	W	L	Pts	SW	SL	SR	SPW	SPL	SPR	Qualification
1	Qatar	1	1	0	3	3	0	MAX	75	65	1.154	Quarterfinals
2	Australia	1	0	1	0	0	3	0.000	65	75	0.867	Quarterfinals

Source: FIVB Live Center

Date	Time		Score		Set 1	Set 2	Set 3	Set 4	Set 5	Total	Report
19 Jun	11:30	Qatar	3–0	Australia	25–22	25–21	25–22			75–65	P2 Report

=== Pool C ===
Pos	Team	Pld	W	L	Pts	SW	SL	SR	SPW	SPL	SPR	Qualification
1	Pakistan	2	2	0	5	6	3	2.000	198	185	1.070	Quarterfinals
2	Chinese Taipei	2	1	1	4	5	4	1.250	211	197	1.071	Quarterfinals
3	Philippines	2	0	2	0	2	6	0.333	169	196	0.862	9th–11th places

Source: FIVB Live Center

Date	Time		Score		Set 1	Set 2	Set 3	Set 4	Set 5	Total	Report
17 Jun	14:00	Pakistan	3–1	Philippines	25–18	25–12	18–25	25–22		93–77	P2 Report
18 Jun	14:00	Chinese Taipei	3–1	Philippines	25–19	23–25	30–28	25–20		103–92	P2 Report
19 Jun	14:00	Pakistan	3–2	Chinese Taipei	25–20	25–22	21–25	16–25	18–16	105–108	P2 Report

=== Pool D ===
Pos	Team	Pld	W	L	Pts	SW	SL	SR	SPW	SPL	SPR	Qualification
1	South Korea	2	2	0	6	6	0	MAX	153	118	1.297	Quarterfinals
2	Vietnam	2	1	1	3	3	3	1.000	132	135	0.978	Quarterfinals
3	New Zealand	2	0	2	0	0	6	0.000	121	153	0.791	9th–11th places

Source: FIVB Live Center

Date	Time		Score		Set 1	Set 2	Set 3	Set 4	Set 5	Total	Report
17 Jun	16:30	South Korea	3–0	New Zealand	28–26	25–13	25–22			78–61	P2 Report
18 Jun	16:30	Vietnam	3–0	New Zealand	25–23	25–22	25–15			75–60	P2 Report
19 Jun	16:30	South Korea	3–0	Vietnam	25–22	25–23	25–12			75–57	P2 Report

== Final round ==
- All times are Arabia Standard Time (UTC+03:00).

=== 9th–11th places ===
Pos	Team	Pld	W	L	Pts	SW	SL	SR	SPW	SPL	SPR
9	Thailand	2	2	0	6	6	0	MAX	152	121	1.256
10	Philippines	2	1	1	3	3	4	0.750	157	149	1.054
11	New Zealand	2	0	2	0	1	6	0.167	136	175	0.777

Source: FIVB Live Center

Date	Time		Score		Set 1	Set 2	Set 3	Set 4	Set 5	Total	Report
20 Jun	19:00	Thailand	3–0	Philippines	25–21	25–20	25–18			75–59	P2 Report
22 Jun	14:00	Thailand	3–0	New Zealand	25–20	25–17	27–25			77–62	P2 Report
24 Jun	12:00	Philippines	3–1	New Zealand	25–16	23–25	25–11	25–22		98–74	P2 Report

=== Final eight ===
Quarterfinals
21 June
Bahrain	3
Chinese Taipei	0
21 June
Australia	1
South Korea	3
21 June
Indonesia	1
Pakistan	3
21 June
Qatar	3
Vietnam	2

Semifinals
23 June
Bahrain	3
South Korea	2
23 June
Pakistan	3
Qatar	0

Final
24 June
Bahrain	3
Pakistan	1
3rd place match
24 June
South Korea	0
Qatar	3

5th–8th semifinals
22 June
Chinese Taipei	1
Australia	3
22 June
Indonesia	3
Vietnam	2

5th place match
23 June
Australia	3
Indonesia	0
7th place match
23 June
Chinese Taipei	3
Vietnam	1

==== Quarterfinals ====
Date	Time		Score		Set 1	Set 2	Set 3	Set 4	Set 5	Total	Report
21 Jun	11:30	Australia	1–3	South Korea	23–25	18–25	25–22	23–25		89–97	P2 Report
21 Jun	14:00	Indonesia	1–3	Pakistan	25–20	21–25	20–25	17–25		83–95	P2 Report
21 Jun	16:30	Qatar	3–2	Vietnam	29–31	25–21	25–15	22–25	15–12	116–104	P2 Report
21 Jun	19:00	Bahrain	3–0	Chinese Taipei	25–18	25–22	35–33			85–73	P2 Report

==== 5th–8th semifinals ====
Date	Time		Score		Set 1	Set 2	Set 3	Set 4	Set 5	Total	Report
22 Jun	16:30	Chinese Taipei	1–3	Australia	22–25	25–20	12–25	19–25		78–95	P2 Report
22 Jun	19:00	Indonesia	3–2	Vietnam	23–25	24–26	25–17	25–23	15–12	112–103	P2 Report

==== Semifinals ====
Date	Time		Score		Set 1	Set 2	Set 3	Set 4	Set 5	Total	Report
23 Jun	16:30	Pakistan	3–0	Qatar	25–22	25–22	25–21			75–65	P2 Report
23 Jun	19:00	Bahrain	3–2	South Korea	25–21	25–23	21–25	18–25	15–13	104–107	P2 Report

==== 7th place match ====
Date	Time		Score		Set 1	Set 2	Set 3	Set 4	Set 5	Total	Report
23 Jun	11:30	Chinese Taipei	3–1	Vietnam	21–25	25–22	25–19	25–22		96–88	P2 Report

==== 5th place match ====
Date	Time		Score		Set 1	Set 2	Set 3	Set 4	Set 5	Total	Report
23 Jun	14:00	Australia	3–0	Indonesia	25–20	25–21	25–22			75–63	P2 Report

==== 3rd place match ====
Date	Time		Score		Set 1	Set 2	Set 3	Set 4	Set 5	Total	Report
24 Jun	15:00	South Korea	0–3	Qatar	21–25	20–25	23–25			64–75	P2 Report

==== Final ====
Date	Time		Score		Set 1	Set 2	Set 3	Set 4	Set 5	Total	Report
24 Jun	19:00	Bahrain	3–1	Pakistan	23–25	25–16	25–17	25–18		98–76	P2 Report

== Final standing ==
Rank	Team
1st place, gold medalist(s)	Bahrain
2nd place, silver medalist(s)	Pakistan
3rd place, bronze medalist(s)	Qatar
4	South Korea
5	Australia
6	Indonesia
7	Chinese Taipei
8	Vietnam
9	Thailand
10	Philippines
11	New Zealand

Qualified for the 2026 Asian Championship and the 2026 AVC Cup as defending champions

2025 Asian Nations Cup champions

Bahrain
First title

14–man roster
Mohamed Anan, Abbas Alkhabbaz, Husain Mansoor, Sayed Hashem Ali, Mahmood Alafyah, Mahmood Ahmed, Mohamed Abdulla, Hani Allawi, Ali Khamis, Naser Anan (c), Mohamed Abdulla Yaqoob, Ayman Haroon, Abbas Sultan, Hasan Warqaa
Head coach
(France) Arnaud Josserand

== Awards ==
- Most valuable player
  Mohamed Abdulla Yaqoob (BHR)
- Best setter
  Mahmood Alafyah (BHR)
- Best outside spikers
  Mohamed Abdulla Yaqoob (BHR)
  Murad Jehan (PAK)
- Best middle blockers
  Musawer Khan (PAK)
  Belal Nabel Abunabot (QAT)
- Best opposite spiker
  Ali Khamis (BHR)
- Best libero
  Ayman Haroon (BHR)
