= New Zealand men's national volleyball team =

Men's national volleyball team representing New Zealand

New Zealand
- Nickname(s): Volley Blacks
- Association: Volleyball New Zealand (VNZ)
- Confederation: AVC
- Head coach: Sebastián González Moreno
- FIVB ranking: 131 ▼5 (3 August 2026)

Uniforms
Home	Away

Asian Championship
- Appearances: 11 (First in 1975)
- Best result: 7th (1975)
- www.volleyballnz.org.nz

The New Zealand men's national volleyball team represents New Zealand in international volleyball competitions and friendly matches. As of October 2019, the team is ranked 44th in the world.

== Competition record ==
=== AVC Continental Championship ===
AVC Continental Championship record
Year	Round	Position	GP	MW	ML	SW	SL	Squad
(Australia) 1975	Round robin	7th	6	0	6	1	18	Squad
(Bahrain) 1979	9th–12th places	11th	6	2	4	10	15	Squad
(Japan) 1983	5th–8th places	8th	8	3	5	9	18	Squad
(Kuwait) 1987	9th–12th places	12th	7	3	4			Squad
(South Korea) 1989	9th–12th places	12th	8	3	5			Squad
(Australia) 1991	9th–12th places	12th	4	0	4	3	12	Squad
(Thailand) 1993	11th place match	11th	6	3	3			Squad
(South Korea) 1995		12th						Squad
(Qatar) 1997	Did not participate							
(Iran) 1999	Did not participate							
(South Korea) 2001	Did not participate							
(China) 2003	13th–15th places	14th	6	1	5	6	16	Squad
(Thailand) 2005	13th–16th places	15th	6	1	5	6	16	Squad
(Indonesia) 2007	Did not participate							
(Philippines) 2009	Did not participate							
(Iran) 2011	Did not participate							
(United Arab Emirates) 2013	Did not participate							
(Iran) 2015	Did not participate							
(Indonesia) 2017	Did not participate							
(Iran) 2019	Did not participate							
(Japan) 2021	Did not participate							
(Iran) 2023	Did not participate							
(Japan) 2026	Preliminary round	12th	3	0	3	0	9	Squad
Total	0 Title	11/23	60	16	44			—

=== AVC Cup ===
AVC Cup record
Year	Round	Position	GP	MW	ML	SW	SL	Squad
(Sri Lanka) 2018	Did not participate							
(Kyrgyzstan) 2022	Did not participate							
(Taiwan) 2023	Did not participate							
(Bahrain) 2024	Did not participate							
(Bahrain) 2025	9th–11th places	11th	4	0	4	1	12	Squad
(India) 2026	9th place match	10th	6	1	5	4	17	Squad
Total	0 Title	2/6	10	1	9	5	29	—

== Team ==
=== Current roster ===
The following is the New Zealand roster in the 2025 Asian Nations Cup.

Head coach: (Chile) Sebastian Gonzalez

No.	Pos.	Name	Date of birth	Height	Weight	Spike	Block	2024–25 club
1	MB	Daniel Malcolm	25 February 2005	1.95 m (6 ft 5 in)	0 kg (0 lb)	347 cm (137 in)	335 cm (132 in)	(New Zealand) Canterbury
3	L	Scott Shipton	21 March 2003	1.85 m (6 ft 1 in)	0 kg (0 lb)	328 cm (129 in)	315 cm (124 in)	(New Zealand) Wellington Titans
4	MB	Matthew Butterfield	29 December 1998	2.01 m (6 ft 7 in)	0 kg (0 lb)	337 cm (133 in)	328 cm (129 in)	(New Zealand) Pioneer Panthers
5	OH	Andrew Salmon	23 May 1998	1.97 m (6 ft 6 in)	0 kg (0 lb)	329 cm (130 in)	315 cm (124 in)	(New Zealand) Pioneer Panthers
7	OH	Johann Timmer (c)	25 October 1991	1.98 m (6 ft 6 in)	0 kg (0 lb)	333 cm (131 in)	315 cm (124 in)	(New Zealand) Harbour Raiders
8	S	Kameo Wagner	23 September 2005	1.90 m (6 ft 3 in)	0 kg (0 lb)	344 cm (135 in)	326 cm (128 in)	(New Zealand) Western Bay Phoenix
9	S	Thomas Vesty	24 December 2006	1.91 m (6 ft 3 in)	0 kg (0 lb)	329 cm (130 in)	318 cm (125 in)	(New Zealand) Shirley VC
11	OH	Wernich Pheiffer	14 May 2004	1.90 m (6 ft 3 in)	0 kg (0 lb)	345 cm (136 in)	330 cm (130 in)	(New Zealand) Harbour Raiders
12	OH	Mana Placid	2 January 2000	1.85 m (6 ft 1 in)	0 kg (0 lb)	339 cm (133 in)	333 cm (131 in)	(New Zealand) Shirley VC
13	OP	Pesamino Morrison	21 October 1996	1.91 m (6 ft 3 in)	0 kg (0 lb)	347 cm (137 in)	335 cm (132 in)	(New Zealand) Pioneer Panthers
14	OP	Seth Grant	15 October 2001	1.93 m (6 ft 4 in)	0 kg (0 lb)	353 cm (139 in)	337 cm (133 in)	(New Zealand) Shirley VC
15	MB	Luke McIntosh	6 November 2005	1.95 m (6 ft 5 in)	0 kg (0 lb)	341 cm (134 in)	332 cm (131 in)	(New Zealand) Shirley VC
