= Kazakhstan men's national volleyball team =

National sports team

Kazakhstan
- Association: Kazakhstan Volleyball Federation (KVF)
- Confederation: AVC
- Head coach: Sergey Trikoz
- FIVB ranking: 73 ▲3 (1 October 2026)

Uniforms
Home	Away

World Championship
- Appearances: 2 (First in 2002)
- Best result: 19th (2002)

Asian Championship
- Appearances: 14 (First in 1993)
- Best result: (1993, 2017)
- www.volley.kz/eng
Honours
Asian Championship
Silver medal – second place	1993 Nakhon Ratchasima	Team
Silver medal – second place	2017 Gresik	Team
Asian Cup
Bronze medal – third place	2014 Almaty	Team

The Kazakhstan men's national volleyball team represents Kazakhstan in international volleyball competitions and friendly matches.

== Competition record ==
=== World Championship ===
World Championship record									Qualification record				
Year	Round	Position	GP	MW	ML	SW	SL	Squad	GP	MW	ML	SW	SL
(Czechoslovakia) 1949	Part of Soviet Union								Part of Soviet Union				
(Soviet Union) 1952	Part of Soviet Union								Part of Soviet Union				
(France) 1956	Part of Soviet Union								Part of Soviet Union				
(Brazil) 1960	Part of Soviet Union								Part of Soviet Union				
(Soviet Union) 1962	Part of Soviet Union								Part of Soviet Union				
(Czechoslovakia) 1966	Part of Soviet Union								Part of Soviet Union				
(Bulgaria) 1970	Part of Soviet Union								Part of Soviet Union				
(Mexico) 1974	Part of Soviet Union								Part of Soviet Union				
(Italy) 1978	Part of Soviet Union								Part of Soviet Union				
(Argentina) 1982	Part of Soviet Union								Part of Soviet Union				
(France) 1986	Part of Soviet Union								Part of Soviet Union				
(Brazil) 1990	Part of Soviet Union								Part of Soviet Union				
(Greece) 1994	Did not qualify								1993 Asian Championship				
(Japan) 1998	Did not qualify								2	0	2	1	6
(Argentina) 2002	First round	19th	3	0	3	2	9	Squad	3	2	1	6	3
(Japan) 2006	First round	21st	5	0	5	2	15	Squad	3	3	0	9	1
(Italy) 2010	Did not qualify								6	3	3	13	9
(Poland) 2014	Did not qualify								5	4	1	13	3
(Italy) (Bulgaria) 2018	Did not qualify								6	2	4	8	15
(Poland) (Slovenia) 2022	Did not qualify								2021 Asian Championship				
(Philippines) 2025	Did not qualify								2023 Asian Championship				
(Poland) 2027	To be determined								Did not qualify				
(Qatar) 2029	To be determined												
Total	0 Titles	2/23	8	0	8	4	24	—	25	14	11	50	37

=== World League ===
- (Brazil) 2015 – 28th place
- (Poland) 2016 – 35th place
- (Brazil) 2017 – 35th place

=== Challenger Cup ===
Challenger Cup record (Defunct)
Year	Round	Position	GP	MW	ML	SW	SL	Squad
(Portugal) 2018	Preliminary round	5th	2	0	2	1	6	Squad
(Slovenia) 2019	Did not enter							
(South Korea) 2022	Did not enter							
(Qatar) 2023	Did not qualify							
(China) 2024	Did not qualify							
Total	0 Titles	1/5	2	0	2	1	6	—

=== Asian Championship ===
Runners up

Asian Championship record
Year	Round	Position	GP	MW	ML	SW	SL	Squad
(Australia) 1975	Part of Soviet Union							
(Bahrain) 1979	Part of Soviet Union							
(Japan) 1983	Part of Soviet Union							
(Kuwait) 1987	Part of Soviet Union							
(South Korea) 1989	Part of Soviet Union							
(Australia) 1991	Part of Soviet Union							
(Thailand) 1993	Final	2nd	7	6	1	18	4	Squad
(South Korea) 1995	Final round	14th	4	0	4			Squad
(Qatar) 1997	Did not enter							
(Iran) 1999	9th–12th places	11th	6	2	4	6	14	Squad
(South Korea) 2001	9th–12th places	9th	5	3	2	11	6	Squad
(China) 2003	5th–8th places	8th	6	1	5	5	16	Squad
(Thailand) 2005	Qualified but withdrew							
(Indonesia) 2007	9th–12th places	10th	7	5	2	17	8	Squad
(Philippines) 2009	5th–8th places	5th	7	5	2	16	10	Squad
(Iran) 2011	9th–12th places	9th	7	5	2	17	10	Squad
(United Arab Emirates) 2013	9th place match	10th	7	4	3	13	11	Squad
(Iran) 2015	9th place match	9th	7	5	2	16	10	Squad
(Indonesia) 2017	Final	2nd	8	5	3	17	15	Squad
(Iran) 2019	9th place match	10th	8	4	4	13	15	Squad
(Japan) 2021	11th place match	11th	7	3	4	10	13	Squad
(Iran) 2023	13th place match	13th	5	3	2	12	8	Squad
(Japan) 2026	Did not participate							
Total	0 Title	14/23	91	51	40	171	140	—

=== Asian Games ===
Fourth place

Year	Rank	Matches	W	L	SW	SL
(India) 1951	No Competition					
(Philippines) 1954	No Competition					
(Japan) 1958	Part of Soviet Union					
(Indonesia) 1962	Part of Soviet Union					
(Thailand) 1966	Part of Soviet Union					
(Thailand) 1970	Part of Soviet Union					
(Iran) 1974	Part of Soviet Union					
(Thailand) 1978	Part of Soviet Union					
(India) 1982	Part of Soviet Union					
(South Korea) 1986	Part of Soviet Union					
(China) 1990	Part of Soviet Union					
(Japan) 1994	4	10	7	3	21	10
(Thailand) 1998	8	6	1	5	4	15
(South Korea) 2002	Did Not Enter					
(Qatar) 2006	7	3	1	2	4	7
(China) 2010	9	7	5	2	16	10
(South Korea) 2014	10	7	3	4	12	15
(Indonesia) 2018	17	4	1	3	8	9
(China) 2022	9	6	3	3	11	13
(Japan) 2026	11	6	3	3	11	13
Total	8/18	49	24	25	87	92

=== AVC Cup ===
Fourth place

AVC Cup record
Year	Round	Position	GP	MW	ML	SW	SL	Squad
(Sri Lanka) 2018	Did not participate							
(Kyrgyzstan) 2022	Did not participate							
(Taiwan) 2023	7th–12th places	7th	5	3	2	10	6	Squad
(Bahrain) 2024	Semifinals	4th	5	2	3	8	12	Squad
(Bahrain) 2025	Qualified but withdrew							
(India) 2026	5th place match	5th	6	4	2	13	11	Squad
Total	0 Titles	3/6	16	9	7	31	29	—

=== Asian Cup ===
Third place

Asian Cup record (Defunct)
Year	Round	Position	GP	MW	ML	SW	SL	Squad
(Thailand) 2008	Did not qualify							
(Iran) 2010	7th place match	7th	6	3	3	10	11	Squad
(Vietnam) 2012	Did not qualify							
(Kazakhstan) 2014	Semifinals	3rd	6	3	3	9	12	Squad
(Thailand) 2016	5th place match	5th	6	4	2	13	10	Squad
(Taiwan) 2018	7th place match	7th	5	3	2	11	8	Squad
(Thailand) 2022	Qualified but withdrew							
Total	0 Title	4/7	23	13	10	43	41	—

=== CAVA Nations League ===
Fourth place

CAVA Nations League record
Year	Round	Position	GP	MW	ML	SW	SL
(Pakistan) 2022	Did not enter						
(Kyrgyzstan) 2023	Did not enter						
(Pakistan) 2024	Did not enter						
(Uzbekistan) 2025	Semifinals	4th	5	1	4	7	13
Total	0 Title	1/4	5	1	4	7	13

== Results and fixtures ==
=== 2026 ===
21 June 2026 AVC Cup PR	India	3–0	Kazakhstan	Ahmedabad, India
21:00 (UTC+5:30)	(25–16, 25–21, 25–15); Report			Stadium: Veer Savarkar Sports Complex; Attendance: 5,000; Referees: Kerekere Mary (NZL), Purwantoro Agung (INA)

22 June 2026 AVC Cup PR	Australia	2–3	Kazakhstan	Ahmedabad, India
12:00 (UTC+5:30)	(25–15, 25–21, 23–25, 24–26, 14–16); Report			Stadium: Veer Savarkar Sports Complex; Attendance: 279; Referees: Chang Chih Hao (TPE), Kshatriya Narendrasingh Ripudamansingh (IND)

23 June 2026 AVC Cup PR	Chinese Taipei	1–3	Kazakhstan	Ahmedabad, India
15:00 (UTC+5:30)	(25–20, 24–26, 16–25, 23–25); Report			Stadium: Veer Savarkar Sports Complex; Attendance: 350; Referees: Purwantoro Agung (INA), Al Moqbali Sulaiman (OMA)

25 June 2026 AVC Cup PR	Bahrain	3–1	Kazakhstan	Ahmedabad, India
18:00 (UTC+5:30)	(22–25, 25–23, 25–17, 25–20); Report			Stadium: Veer Savarkar Sports Complex; Attendance: 2,152; Referees: Chang Chih Hao (TPE), Lee Kwang-Hun (KOR)

26 June 2026 AVC Cup PR	New Zealand	1–3	Kazakhstan	Ahmedabad, India
12:00 (UTC+5:30)	(21–25, 19–25, 25–22, 31–33); Report			Stadium: Veer Savarkar Sports Complex; Attendance: 315; Referees: Kittichaisombat Jatuporn (THA), Purwantoro Agung (INA)

28 June 2026 AVC Cup 5th–6th	Kazakhstan	3–1	Thailand	Ahmedabad, India
12:30 (UTC+5:30)	(25–21, 25–23, 22–25, 27–25); Report			Stadium: Veer Savarkar Sports Complex; Attendance: 1,000; Referees: Hasan Ahmed Ali (BHR), Al Moqbali Sulaiman (OMA)

== Team ==
=== Current squad ===
The following is the Kazakhstani roster in the 2024 Asian Challenge Cup.

Head coach: (Kazakhstan) Viktor Kozik

No.	Name	Date of birth	Pos.	Height	Weight	Spike	Block	2023–24 club
1	Yerikzhan Boken	31 July 1996	L	1.68 m (5 ft 6 in)	61 kg (134 lb)	260 cm (100 in)	255 cm (100 in)	(Kazakhstan) Taraz VC
2	Niyaz Nurgazin	10 March 1999	S	1.91 m (6 ft 3 in)	72 kg (159 lb)	315 cm (124 in)	305 cm (120 in)	(Kazakhstan) Pavlodar VC
3	Vladimir Prokofyev	9 February 1993	MB	2.03 m (6 ft 8 in)	94 kg (207 lb)	345 cm (136 in)	336 cm (132 in)	(Kazakhstan) Zayik VC
5	Boris Kempa	25 May 1991	OH	1.92 m (6 ft 4 in)	76 kg (168 lb)	345 cm (136 in)	320 cm (130 in)	(Kazakhstan) Pavlodar VC
7	Aibat Netalin	30 March 1992	OH	1.96 m (6 ft 5 in)	97 kg (214 lb)	320 cm (130 in)	300 cm (120 in)	(Kazakhstan) Aktobe VC
8	Petr Churzin	25 September 1989	OP	1.94 m (6 ft 4 in)	92 kg (203 lb)	335 cm (132 in)	325 cm (128 in)	(Kazakhstan) Atyrau VC
9	Sergey Okunev	29 April 1990	L	1.82 m (6 ft 0 in)	83 kg (183 lb)	310 cm (120 in)	300 cm (120 in)	(Kazakhstan) Pavlodar VC
11	Damir Akimov	22 September 1991	MB	2.02 m (6 ft 8 in)	104 kg (229 lb)	350 cm (140 in)	325 cm (128 in)	(Kazakhstan) Taraz VC
12	Nodirkhan Kadirkhanov	6 September 1991	MB	2.02 m (6 ft 8 in)	100 kg (220 lb)	335 cm (132 in)	310 cm (120 in)	(Kazakhstan) Taraz VC
18	Vitaliy Vorivodin (c)	31 July 1990	OH	1.93 m (6 ft 4 in)	104 kg (229 lb)	345 cm (136 in)	330 cm (130 in)	(Kazakhstan) Zhayik VC
21	Mikhail Ustinov	22 December 1989	OH	1.90 m (6 ft 3 in)	82 kg (181 lb)	330 cm (130 in)	310 cm (120 in)	(Kazakhstan) Taraz VC
23	Askar Serik	29 September 1997	MB	2.01 m (6 ft 7 in)	86 kg (190 lb)	345 cm (136 in)	335 cm (132 in)	(Kazakhstan) Pavlodar VC
24	Nurlibek Nurmakhambetov	17 July 2000	S	2.02 m (6 ft 8 in)	85 kg (187 lb)	325 cm (128 in)	320 cm (130 in)	(Kazakhstan) Taraz VC

=== Coach history ===
- (Kazakhstan) Alexander Zapevalov (2002)
- (Russia) Vladimir Kondra (2006)
- (Latvia) Genadijs Parsins (2009–2011)
- (Kazakhstan) Rafail Gilyazutdinov (2013)
- (Kazakhstan) Andrey Patrakov (2014–2015)
- (Russia) Igor Nikolchenko (2016–2019)
- (France) Boris Grebennikov (2021–2023)
- (Kazakhstan) Viktor Kozik (2024–2025)
- (Kazakhstan) Sergey Trikoz (2026–)
