= Anton Kuznetsov =

Kazakhstani volleyball player (born 1989)

Personal information
- Nationality: Kazakhstani
- Born: 25 September 1989 (age 37)
- Height: 204 cm (6 ft 8 in)
- Weight: 91 kg (201 lb)
- Spike: 346 cm (136 in)
- Block: 335 cm (132 in)

Volleyball information
- Number: 2 (national team)

Career
Years	Teams
2015	Kondensat-Zhaikmunay

National team
2015	Kazakhstan

Anton Kuznetsov (born 25 September 1989) is a Kazakhstani male volleyball player. He is part of the Kazakhstan men's national volleyball team. On club level he plays for Kondensat-Zhaikmunay.
