= AVC Men's Volleyball Cup =

Indoor volleyball competition for men's national teams

- Most recent season or competition: 2026 AVC Men's Volleyball Cup
- Formerly: AVC Men's Challenge Cup (2018–2022); AVC Challenge Cup for Men (2023–2024); AVC Men's Volleyball Nations Cup (2025)
- Sport: Volleyball
- Founded: 2018; 8 years ago
- First season: 2018
- No. of teams: 12
- Continent: Asia and Oceania (AVC)
- Most recent champions: Indonesia (1st title)
- Most titles: Bahrain; Indonesia; Iraq; Kyrgyzstan; Qatar; Thailand (1 title each)
- Broadcaster: Volleyball TV (Global)
- Website: asianvolleyball.net

The AVC Men's Volleyball Cup (previously known as the AVC Men's Challenge Cup, AVC Challenge Cup for Men and AVC Men's Volleyball Nations Cup), is an annual international volleyball competition in Asia and Oceania contested by the senior men's national teams of the members of Asian Volleyball Confederation (AVC), one of the sport's continent governing body.

From 2023 to 2024, the winner will qualify for the FIVB Challenger Cup.

This event should not be confused with the other, more prestigious continental competition for Asian national volleyball teams, the Asian Volleyball Championship and the Asian Volleyball Cup (2008–2022).

The six AVC Men's Volleyball Cup tournaments has been won by six different national teams. Bahrain, Indonesia, Iraq, Kyrgyzstan, Qatar and Thailand have won once each.

== History ==
Originally, the tournament was awarded every two years beginning 2018. This tournament was initially set up to serve as a qualifier to the Men's Asian Volleyball Cup, which served as the tournament for the top teams of the AVC. The champions were Iraq in the 2018 edition and Kyrgyzstan in the 2022 edition. Both teams defeated Saudi Arabia in a tie-break final.

From 2023 to 2024, the AVC Challenge Cup has reformed from being held biennially to annually as it serve as a qualifier for the FIVB Challenger Cup. Thailand were the champions in the 2023 edition after defeating Bahrain in the straight-sets final. Qatar won the 2024 edition after a straight-sets victory over Pakistan in the final.

Starting in 2025, the tournament is rebranded and will be known as the AVC Men's Volleyball Nations Cup. With the new format of the Nations League and the abolishment of the Challenger Cup, this tournament will be served as an annual competition for teams not participating in the VNL to earn world ranking points to increase their place in the FIVB Senior World Rankings, and possibly qualify to the future editions of the VNL. Furthermore, the champions of this tournament will qualify for the Asian Men's Volleyball Championship, starting on the 2026 edition.

== Results summary ==
=== Finals ===
Year	Hosts	Final			3rd place match			Teams
Year	Hosts	Champions	Score	Runners-up	3rd place	Score	4th place	Teams
2018; Details	(Sri Lanka); Colombo	Iraq	3–2	Saudi Arabia	Sri Lanka	3–0	Bangladesh	8
2022; Details	(Kyrgyzstan); Cholpon-Ata	Kyrgyzstan	3–2	Saudi Arabia	Uzbekistan	3–2	Mongolia	4
2023; Details	(Taiwan); Taipei	Thailand	3–0	Bahrain	South Korea	3–1	Vietnam	15
2024; Details	(Bahrain); Isa Town	Qatar	3–0	Pakistan	South Korea	3–1	Kazakhstan	12
2025; Details	(Bahrain); Manama	Bahrain	3–1	Pakistan	Qatar	3–0	South Korea	11
2026; Details	(India); Ahmedabad	Indonesia	3–0	South Korea	India	3–1	Bahrain	11

=== Performances by country ===
Team	Champions	Runners-up	3rd place	4th place	Total
Bahrain	1	1	0	1	3
Qatar	1	0	1	0	2
Iraq	1	0	0	0	1
Kyrgyzstan	1	0	0	0	1
Thailand	1	0	0	0	1
Indonesia	1	0	0	0	1
Saudi Arabia	0	2	0	0	2
Pakistan	0	2	0	0	2
South Korea	0	1	2	1	5
Sri Lanka	0	0	1	0	1
Uzbekistan	0	0	1	0	1
India	0	0	1	0	1
Bangladesh	0	0	0	1	1
Mongolia	0	0	0	1	1
Vietnam	0	0	0	1	1
Kazakhstan	0	0	0	1	1

=== Performances by zonal association ===
Zonal association	Champions	Runners-up	3rd place	4th place	Total
WAVA (West Asia)	3	3	1	1	8
SAVA (Southeast Asia)	2	0	0	1	3
CAVA (Central Asia)	1	2	3	2	8
EAVA (East Asia)	0	1	2	2	5

== Medal summary ==
Rank	Nation	Gold	Silver	Bronze	Total
1	Bahrain	1	1	0	2
2	Qatar	1	0	1	2
3	Indonesia	1	0	0	1
3	Iraq	1	0	0	1
3	Kyrgyzstan	1	0	0	1
3	Thailand	1	0	0	1
7	Pakistan	0	2	0	2
7	Saudi Arabia	0	2	0	2
9	South Korea	0	1	2	3
10	India	0	0	1	1
10	Sri Lanka	0	0	1	1
10	Uzbekistan	0	0	1	1
Totals (12 entries)		6	6	6	18

== National team appearances ==
=== Comprehensive team results ===
Year Team	(Sri Lanka) 2018 (8)	(Kyrgyzstan) 2022 (4)	(Taiwan) 2023 (15)	(Bahrain) 2024 (12)	(Bahrain) 2025 (11)	(India) 2026 (11)	Total
Australia	•	•	5th	8th	5th	11th	4
Bahrain	•	•	2nd	7th	1st	4th	4
Bangladesh	4th	•	•	•	•	•	1
China	•	•	•	5th			1
Chinese Taipei	•	•	9th	12th	7th	8th	4
Hong Kong	6th	•	11th	•	•	•	2
India	•	•	15th	•	•	3rd	2
Indonesia	•	•	6th	11th	6th	1st	4
Iraq	1st	•	•	•	•	•	1
Kazakhstan	•	•	7th	4th	••	5th	3
Kyrgyzstan	•	1st	•	•	•	•	1
Macau	•	•	12th	•	•	•	1
Malaysia	7th	•	•	•	•	•	1
Mongolia	8th	4th	8th	•	•	•	3
New Zealand	•	•	•	•	11th	10th	2
Oman	•	•	•	•	•	9th	1
Pakistan	•	•	•	2nd	2nd	••	2
Philippines	•	•	10th	10th	10th	•	3
Qatar	•	•		1st	3rd	7th	3
Saudi Arabia	2nd	2nd	14th	•	•	•	3
South Korea	•	•	3rd	3rd	4th	2nd	4
Sri Lanka	3rd	•	13th	•	•	•	2
Thailand	•	•	1st	9th	9th	6th	4
United Arab Emirates	5th	•	•	•	•	•	1
Uzbekistan	•	3rd	•	•	•	•	1
Vietnam	•	•	4th	6th	8th	•	3

Legend
1st	Champions
2nd	Runners-up
3rd	3rd place
4th	4th place
Q	Qualified for upcoming tournament
••	Qualified but withdrew
•	Did not qualify
×	Withdrew before qualification / Banned by FIVB
	Hosts
	Did not enter
—N/a	Not a FIVB member

=== Debut of teams ===
Year	Debutants	Total
2018	Bangladesh, Hong Kong, Iraq, Malaysia, Mongolia, Saudi Arabia, Sri Lanka, United Arab Emirates	8
2022	Kyrgyzstan, Uzbekistan	2
2023	Australia, Bahrain, Chinese Taipei, India, Indonesia, Kazakhstan, Macau, Philippines, South Korea, Thailand, Vietnam	11
2024	China, Pakistan, Qatar	3
2025	New Zealand	1
2026	Oman	1

== Awards ==
Year	Most Valuable Player
2018	(Saudi Arabia) Ahmed Albakheet
2022	(Kyrgyzstan) Onolbek Kanybek Uulu
2023	(Thailand) Anurak Phanram
2024	(Qatar) Renan Ribeiro
2025	(Bahrain) Mohamed Abdulla Yaqoob
2026	(Indonesia) Boy Arnez Arabi

Year	Best Setter
2018	(Iraq) Mustafa Haneed Jabbar
2022	(Kyrgyzstan) Medetbek Ergesh Uulu
2023	(South Korea) Hwang Taek-eui
2024	(Qatar) Borislav Georgiev
2025	(Bahrain) Mahmood Alafyah
2026	(Indonesia) Alfin Daniel Pratama

Year	Best Outside Spikers
2018	(Sri Lanka) Deepthi Romesh
2018	(Bangladesh) Horosit Biswas
2022	(Saudi Arabia) Omar Alnajrani
2022	(Saudi Arabia) Ahmed Albakheet
2023	(Thailand) Anut Promchan
2023	(Bahrain) Mohamed Abdulla Yaqoob
2024	(Qatar) Raimi Wadidie
2024	(South Korea) Kim Ji-han
2025	(Bahrain) Mohamed Abdulla Yaqoob
2025	(Pakistan) Murad Jehan
2026	(Indonesia) Boy Arnez Arabi
2026	(South Korea) Jeong Han-yong

Year	Best Middle Blockers
2018	(Saudi Arabia) Ibrahim Majrashi
2018	(Iraq) Islam Sachit Challab
2022	(Uzbekistan) Azizbek Kurchkorov
2022	(Saudi Arabia) Ibrahim Majrashi
2023	(Thailand) Kissada Nilsawai
2023	(South Korea) Kim Min-jae
2024	(Qatar) Ibrahim Ibrahim
2024	(Pakistan) Musawer Khan
2025	(Pakistan) Musawer Khan
2025	(Qatar) Belal Nabel Abunabot
2026	(Indonesia) Hendra Kurniawan
2026	(South Korea) Park Chang-seong

Year	Best Opposite Spiker
2018	(Iraq) Hussain Nameer Shamil
2022	(Kyrgyzstan) Omurbek Zhunusov
2023	(Bahrain) Ali Khamis
2024	(Pakistan) Murad Khan
2025	(Bahrain) Ali Khamis
2026	(South Korea) Shin Ho-jin

Year	Best Libero
2018	(Sri Lanka) Lakmal Wijesekara
2022	(Kyrgyzstan) Kutmanbek Absatarov
2023	(Bahrain) Ayman Haroon
2024	(Pakistan) Nasir Ali
2025	(Bahrain) Ayman Haroon
2026	(India) Anand Kottarathil

== See also ==
- AVC Women's Volleyball Cup
- AVC Men's Volleyball Continental Championship
- AVC Men's U20 Volleyball Championship
- AVC Boys' U18 Volleyball Championship
- AVC Boys' U16 Volleyball Championship
