= Bahrain men's national volleyball team =

National volleyball team

Bahrain
- Association: Bahrain Volleyball Association (BVA)
- Confederation: AVC
- Head coach: Ivan Joksimović
- FIVB ranking: 46 ▼3 (1 October 2026)

Uniforms
Home	Away

Asian Championship
- Appearances: 11 (First in 1979)
- Best result: 8th (1987, 2023)
Honours
AVC Cup
Gold medal – first place	2025 Manama	Team
Silver medal – second place	2023 Taipei	Team
Asian Cup
Bronze medal – third place	2022 Nakhon Pathom	Team
Arab Championship
Gold medal – first place	1992 Syria	Team
Gold medal – first place	2008 Bahrain	Team
Gold medal – first place	2024 Bahrain	Team
Silver medal – second place	2012 Bahrain	Team
Silver medal – second place	2016 Egypt	Team
Silver medal – second place	2018 Egypt	Team
Bronze medal – third place	1998 Bahrain	Team
Islamic Solidarity Games
Bronze medal – third place	2025 Riyadh	Team
WAVA Championship
Silver medal – second place	2025 Manama	Team

The Bahrain men's national volleyball team represents Bahrain in international volleyball competitions and friendly matches. As of January 2025, the team is currently ranked 58th in the world.

== Competition record ==
=== AVC Continental Championship ===
Champions Runners up Third place Fourth place

AVC Continental Championship record
Year	Round	Position	GP	MW	ML	SW	SL	Squad
(Australia) 1975	Did not enter							
(Bahrain) 1979	13th–15th places	14th	5	1	4	8	13	Squad
(Japan) 1983	Did not enter							
(Kuwait) 1987	7th place match	8th	7	2	5	8	16	Squad
(South Korea) 1989	15th place match	16th						Squad
(Australia) 1991	Did not enter							
(Thailand) 1993	Did not enter							
(South Korea) 1995	Did not enter							
(Qatar) 1997	9th–12th places	10th						Squad
(Iran) 1999	9th–12th places	10th	7	3	4	10	11	Squad
(South Korea) 2001	Did not enter							
(China) 2003	13th–15th places	13th	6	2	4	9	12	Squad
(Thailand) 2005	9th place match	10th	6	3	3	10	13	Squad
(Indonesia) 2007	Did not enter							
(Philippines) 2009	Did not enter							
(Iran) 2011	Did not enter							
(United Arab Emirates) 2013	11th place match	12th	7	3	4	15	13	Squad
(Iran) 2015	11th place match	12th	7	3	4	13	14	Squad
(Indonesia) 2017	Did not enter							
(Iran) 2019	Did not enter							
(Japan) 2021	9th place match	10th	7	4	3	15	10	Squad
(Iran) 2023	7th place match	8th	4	1	3	6	11	Squad
(Japan) 2026	Preliminary round	9th	3	1	2	3	6	Squad
Total	0 Titles	12/23	59	23	36	97	119	—

=== Asian Games ===
Champions Runners up Third place Fourth place

Asian Games record
Year	Round	Position	GP	MW	ML	SW	SL	Squad
(Japan) 1958	Did not participate							
(Indonesia) 1962	Did not participate							
(Thailand) 1966	Did not participate							
(Thailand) 1970	Did not participate							
(Iran) 1974	Did not participate							
(Thailand) 1978	Preliminary round	13th	4	0	4	0	12	Squad
(India) 1982	Did not participate							
(South Korea) 1986	5th–8th place	8th	8	3	5	14	17	Squad
(China) 1990	Did not participate							
(Japan) 1994	Did not participate							
(Thailand) 1998	Did not participate							
(South Korea) 2002	Did not participate							
(Qatar) 2006	7th place match	8th	9	6	3	20	13	Squad
(China) 2010	Did not participate							
(South Korea) 2014	Did not participate							
(Indonesia) 2018	Did not participate							
(China) 2022	11th place match	12th	5	1	4	7	13	Squad
(Japan) 2026	Did not participated							
Total	0 Titles	4/18	26	10	16	41	55	—

=== AVC Cup ===
Champions Runners up Third place Fourth place

AVC Cup record
Year	Round	Position	GP	MW	ML	SW	SL	Squad
(Sri Lanka) 2018	Did not participate							
(Kyrgyzstan) 2022	Did not participate							
(Taiwan) 2023	Final	2nd	6	4	2	14	8	Squad
(Bahrain) 2024	5th–8th places	7th	5	2	3	9	9	Squad
(Bahrain) 2025	Final	1st	5	5	0	15	4	Squad
(India) 2026	Semifinals	4th	7	4	3	14	12	Squad
Total	1 Title	4/6	23	15	8	52	33	—

=== Asian Cup ===
Champions Runners up Third place Fourth place

Asian Cup record (Defunct)
Year	Round	Position	GP	MW	ML	SW	SL	Squad
(Thailand) 2008	Did not participate							
(Iran) 2010	Did not participate							
(Vietnam) 2012	Did not participate							
(Kazakhstan) 2014	Did not participate							
(Thailand) 2016	Did not participate							
(Taiwan) 2018	Did not participate							
(Thailand) 2022	Semifinals	3rd	6	4	2	14	10	Squad
Total	0 Titles	1/7	6	4	2	14	10	—

=== Arab Championship ===
- (Syria) 1992 – (gold) Champions
- (Bahrain) 1994 – ...th place
- (Bahrain) 1998 – (bronze) 3rd place
- (Bahrain) 2006 – 4th place
- (Bahrain) 2008 – (gold) Champions
- (Bahrain) 2012 – (silver) Runners-up
- (Kuwait) 2014 – 5th place
- (Egypt) 2016 – (silver) Runners-up
- (Egypt) 2018 – (silver) Runners-up
- (Bahrain) 2024 – (gold) Champions

=== Arab Volleyball Challenge Cup ===
- (Jordan) 2025 – 5th place

=== WAVA Championship ===
Champions Runners up Third place Fourth place

WAVA Championship record
Year	Round	Position	GP	MW	ML	SW	SL	Squad
(Bahrain) 2025	Final	2nd	6	5	1	17	4	Squad
(Oman) 2026	Did not participated							
Total	0 Titles	1/2	6	5	1	17	4	—

=== Islamic Solidarity Games ===
- (Saudi Arabia) 2025 – (bronze) 3rd place

== Results and fixtures ==
=== 2025 ===
==== 2025 Asian Nations Cup ====
17 June 2025; 19:00 (UTC+03:00)	Bahrain	3–1	Thailand	Isa Bin Rashed Hall, Manama, Bahrain
17 June 2025; 19:00 (UTC+03:00)	(25–21, 21–25, 25–19, 25–22); Report			Isa Bin Rashed Hall, Manama, Bahrain

19 June 2025; 19:00 (UTC+03:00)	Bahrain	3–0	Indonesia	Isa Bin Rashed Hall, Manama, Bahrain
19 June 2025; 19:00 (UTC+03:00)	(25–13, 27–25, 25–22); Report			Isa Bin Rashed Hall, Manama, Bahrain

21 June 2025; 19:00 (UTC+03:00)	Bahrain	3–0	Chinese Taipei	Isa Bin Rashed Hall, Manama, Bahrain
21 June 2025; 19:00 (UTC+03:00)	(25–18, 25–22, 35–33); Report			Isa Bin Rashed Hall, Manama, Bahrain

23 June 2025; 19:00 (UTC+03:00)	Bahrain	3–2	South Korea	Isa Bin Rashed Hall, Manama, Bahrain
23 June 2025; 19:00 (UTC+03:00)	(25–21, 25–23, 21–25, 18–25, 15–13); Report			Isa Bin Rashed Hall, Manama, Bahrain

24 June 2025; 19:00 (UTC+03:00)	Bahrain	3–1	Pakistan	Isa Bin Rashed Hall, Manama, Bahrain
24 June 2025; 19:00 (UTC+03:00)	(23–25, 25–16, 25–17, 25–18); Report			Isa Bin Rashed Hall, Manama, Bahrain

==== 2025 West Asian Championship ====
19 July 2025; 19:00 (UTC+03:00)	Bahrain	3–0	Lebanon	Isa Bin Rashed Hall, Manama, Bahrain
19 July 2025; 19:00 (UTC+03:00)	(25–14, 25–15, 25–15); Report			Isa Bin Rashed Hall, Manama, Bahrain

20 July 2025; 19:00 (UTC+03:00)	Jordan	0–3	Bahrain	Isa Bin Rashed Hall, Manama, Bahrain
20 July 2025; 19:00 (UTC+03:00)	(20–25, 14–25, 12–25); Report			Isa Bin Rashed Hall, Manama, Bahrain

21 July 2025; 19:00 (UTC+03:00)	United Arab Emirates	0–3	Bahrain	Isa Bin Rashed Hall, Manama, Bahrain
21 July 2025; 19:00 (UTC+03:00)	(14–25, 15–25, 18–25); Report			Isa Bin Rashed Hall, Manama, Bahrain

23 July 2025; 19:00 (UTC+03:00)	Bahrain	3–0	Kuwait	Isa Bin Rashed Hall, Manama, Bahrain
23 July 2025; 19:00 (UTC+03:00)	(25–15, 25–22, 25–20); Report			Isa Bin Rashed Hall, Manama, Bahrain

25 July 2025; 19:00 (UTC+03:00)	Bahrain	3–1	Saudi Arabia	Isa Bin Rashed Hall, Manama, Bahrain
25 July 2025; 19:00 (UTC+03:00)	(26–28, 25–16, 25–22, 25–22); Report			Isa Bin Rashed Hall, Manama, Bahrain

26 July 2025; 19:00 (UTC+03:00)	Bahrain	2–3	Qatar	Isa Bin Rashed Hall, Manama, Bahrain
26 July 2025; 19:00 (UTC+03:00)	(18–25, 18–25, 25–19, 25–21, 13–15); Report			Isa Bin Rashed Hall, Manama, Bahrain

== Team ==
=== Current squad ===
The following is the Bahraini roster in the 2025 Asian Nations Cup.

Head coach: Arnaud Josserand

No.	Name	Date of birth	Pos.	Height	Weight	Spike	Block	2024–25 club
2	Mohamed Anan	30 April 1995	OP	1.90 m (6 ft 3 in)	80 kg (180 lb)	330 cm (130 in)	320 cm (130 in)	(Bahrain) Al Ahli
4	Abbas Alkhabbaz	9 August 1989	MB	1.98 m (6 ft 6 in)	88 kg (194 lb)	336 cm (132 in)	318 cm (125 in)	(Bahrain) Al Muharraq
5	Husain Mansoor	20 November 2000	S	1.80 m (5 ft 11 in)	72 kg (159 lb)	320 cm (130 in)	310 cm (120 in)	(Bahrain) Nabihsaleh
6	Sayed Hashem Ali	30 July 2003	OH	1.90 m (6 ft 3 in)	77 kg (170 lb)	320 cm (130 in)	310 cm (120 in)	(Bahrain) Nabihsaleh
7	Mahmood Alafyah	19 December 1993	S	1.87 m (6 ft 2 in)	82 kg (181 lb)	310 cm (120 in)	300 cm (120 in)	(Bahrain) Al Muharraq
8	Mahmood Ahmed	19 February 1996	OH	1.85 m (6 ft 1 in)	79 kg (174 lb)	330 cm (130 in)	320 cm (130 in)	(Bahrain) Darkulaib
9	Mohamed Abdulla	30 November 1999	MB	1.99 m (6 ft 6 in)	80 kg (180 lb)	320 cm (130 in)	310 cm (120 in)	(Bahrain) Nabihsaleh
12	Hani Allawi	7 December 2000	MB	2.00 m (6 ft 7 in)	85 kg (187 lb)	330 cm (130 in)	320 cm (130 in)	(Bahrain) Al Ahli
13	Ali Khamis	4 October 1991	OP	1.93 m (6 ft 4 in)	85 kg (187 lb)	320 cm (130 in)	310 cm (120 in)	(Bahrain) Al Ahli
15	Naser Anan (c)	16 December 1992	OH	1.85 m (6 ft 1 in)	76 kg (168 lb)	330 cm (130 in)	310 cm (120 in)	(Bahrain) Al Ahli
17	Mohamed Abdulla Yaqoob	8 July 1994	OH	1.87 m (6 ft 2 in)	72 kg (159 lb)	340 cm (130 in)	310 cm (120 in)	(Bahrain) Darkulaib
18	Ayman Haroon	6 September 1986	L	1.79 m (5 ft 10 in)	80 kg (180 lb)	270 cm (110 in)	260 cm (100 in)	(Bahrain) Al Ahli
20	Abbas Sultan	27 June 1998	L	1.77 m (5 ft 10 in)	73 kg (161 lb)	270 cm (110 in)	260 cm (100 in)	(Bahrain) Darkulaib
21	Hasan Warqaa	24 April 2005	MB	2.01 m (6 ft 7 in)	85 kg (187 lb)	360 cm (140 in)	350 cm (140 in)	(Bahrain) Darkulaib

=== Coach history ===
- (Brazil) Marco Queiroga (2021)
- (Brazil) Issanayê Ramires (2022)
- (Argentina) Ruben Wolochin (2023)
- (Argentina) Jorge Elgueta (2015, 2024)
- (France) Arnaud Josserand (2025)
- (Montenegro) Ivan Joksimović (2026–)

== Kit providers ==
The table below shows the history of kit providers for the Bahrain national volleyball team.

Period	Kit provider
	Macron
2025–	Be Sport
