= 2024 AVC Challenge Cup for Men =

Asian men's volleyball tournament

2024 AVC Men's Challenge Cup
كأس التحدي الآسيوي للرجال للكرة الطائرة
- Official logo

Tournament details
- Host country: Bahrain
- City: Isa Town
- Dates: 2–9 June
- Teams: 12 (from 1 confederation)
- Venue: 1 (in 1 host city)

Final positions
- Champions: Qatar (1st title)
- Runners-up: Pakistan
- Third place: South Korea
- Fourth place: Kazakhstan

Tournament awards
- MVP: (Qatar) Renan Ribeiro
- Best Setter: (Qatar) Borislav Georgiev
- Best OH: (Qatar) Raimi Wadidie; (South Korea) Kim Ji-han
- Best MB: (Qatar) Ibrahim Ibrahim; (Pakistan) Musawer Khan
- Best OPP: (Pakistan) Murad Khan
- Best Libero: (Pakistan) Nasir Ali

Tournament statistics
- Matches played: 28
- Attendance: 19,557 (698 per match)

The 2024 AVC Challenge Cup for Men was the fifth edition of the AVC Men's Challenge Cup, an annual international volleyball tournament organised by the Asian Volleyball Confederation (AVC), in that year with the Bahrain Volleyball Association (BVA). The tournament was held at the Isa Bin Rashid Hall in Isa Town, Bahrain from 2 to 9 June 2024. The winners of the tournament, Qatar, qualified for the 2024 FIVB Men's Volleyball Challenger Cup.

Qatar won their first title after defeating Pakistan in a straight-sets final. South Korea defeated Kazakhstan in a four-set 3rd place match and took the bronze medal. Renan Ribeiro was named as the MVP of the tournament.

== Host selection ==
Bahrain and Australia submitted its bid to host the tournament by December 2023. Bahrain was awarded the hosting rights.

== Team ==
=== Qualification ===
Following the AVC regulations, the maximum of 12 teams in for the AVC Challenge Cup will be selected by:

- 1 team for the host country
- 1 team: the defending champion from the previous edition (2023)
- 5 other top-ranked teams from the previous edition
- 5 other entrant teams with consideration given for FIVB world rankings

=== Qualified teams ===
Country	Zone	Qualified as	Qualified on	Previous appearances			Previous best performance
Country	Zone	Qualified as	Qualified on	Total	First	Last	Previous best performance
Bahrain	WAZVA	Host country	13 July 2023 (Note: Bahrain would have qualified if not selected as the host country as they were the runners-up of the previous edition. Seventh placers Kazakhstan were given a berth as the next highest placing team.)	1	2023		Runners-up (2023)
Thailand	SEAVA	Defending champions	13 July 2023	1	2023		Champions (2023)
South Korea	EAZVA	2023 Challenge Cup 3rd placer	13 July 2023	1	2023		3rd place (2023)
Vietnam	SEAVA	2023 Challenge Cup 4th placer	13 July 2023	1	2023		4th place (2023)
Australia	OZVA	2023 Challenge Cup 5th placer	13 July 2023	1	2023		5th place (2023)
Indonesia	SEAVA	2023 Challenge Cup 6th placer	13 July 2023	1	2023		6th place (2023)
Kazakhstan	CAVA	2023 Challenge Cup 7th placer	3 May 2024	1	2023		7th place (2023)
Qatar	WAZVA	Zonal Quotas	3 May 2024	0	None		None
China	EAZVA	Zonal Quotas	3 May 2024	0	None		None
Chinese Taipei	EAZVA	Zonal Quotas	3 May 2024	1	2023		9th place (2023)
Pakistan	CAVA	Zonal Quotas	3 May 2024	0	None		None
Philippines	SEAVA	Zonal Quotas	3 May 2024	1	2023		10th place (2023)

Iran and Japan, which were part of the 2024 FIVB Men's Volleyball Nations League, were ineligible to submit entries to this tournament.

== Venue ==
Isa Town, Bahrain
Isa Bin Rashed Hall
Capacity: 10,500

== Pools composition ==
The overview of pools was released on 3 May 2024.

Pool A	Pool B	Pool C	Pool D
Bahrain (Hosts)	Thailand (1)	South Korea (3)	Vietnam (4)
Philippines (–)	Kazakhstan (7)	Indonesia (6)	Australia (5)
China (–)	Pakistan (–)	Qatar (–)	Chinese Taipei (–)

== Pool standing procedure ==
1. Total number of victories (matches won, matches lost)
2. In the event of a tie, the following first tiebreaker will apply: The teams will be ranked by the most point gained per match as follows:
  - Match won 3–0 or 3–1: 3 points for the winner, 0 points for the loser
  - Match won 3–2: 2 points for the winner, 1 point for the loser
  - Match forfeited: 3 points for the winner, 0 points (0–25, 0–25, 0–25) for the loser
3. If teams are still tied after examining the number of victories and points gained, then the AVC will examine the results in order to break the tie in the following order:
  - Set quotient: if two or more teams are tied on the number of points gained, they will be ranked by the quotient resulting from the division of the number of all set won by the number of all sets lost.
  - Points quotient: if the tie persists based on the set quotient, the teams will be ranked by the quotient resulting from the division of all points scored by the total of points lost during all sets.
  - If the tie persists based on the point quotient, the tie will be broken based on the team that won the match of the Round Robin Phase between the tied teams. When the tie in point quotient is between three or more teams, these teams ranked taking into consideration only the matches involving the teams in question.

== Squads ==
The full list of team squads were announced on the competition daily bulletin.

== Preliminary round ==
- All times are Arabia Standard Time (UTC+03:00).

=== Pool A ===
Pos	Team	Pld	W	L	Pts	SW	SL	SR	SPW	SPL	SPR	Qualification
1	China	2	2	0	6	6	0	MAX	150	121	1.240	Quarterfinals
2	Bahrain (H)	2	1	1	3	3	3	1.000	133	136	0.978	Quarterfinals
3	Philippines	2	0	2	0	0	6	0.000	124	150	0.827	9th–12th semifinals

Source: 2024 AVC Challenge Cup - Men
(H) Host

Date	Time		Score		Set 1	Set 2	Set 3	Set 4	Set 5	Total	Report
2 Jun	19:00	Philippines	0–3	China	19–25	22–25	22–25			63–75	P2 Report
3 Jun	19:00	Bahrain	3–0	Philippines	25–18	25–23	25–20			75–61	P2 Report
4 Jun	19:00	China	3–0	Bahrain	25–20	25–22	25–16			75–58	P2 Report

=== Pool B ===
Pos	Team	Pld	W	L	Pts	SW	SL	SR	SPW	SPL	SPR	Qualification
1	Pakistan	2	2	0	6	6	0	MAX	150	116	1.293	Quarterfinals
2	Kazakhstan	2	1	1	2	3	5	0.600	165	182	0.907	Quarterfinals
3	Thailand	2	0	2	1	2	6	0.333	164	181	0.906	9th–12th semifinals

Source: 2024 AVC Challenge Cup - Men

Date	Time		Score		Set 1	Set 2	Set 3	Set 4	Set 5	Total	Report
2 Jun	11:30	Pakistan	3–0	Kazakhstan	25–19	25–19	25–21			75–59	P2 Report
3 Jun	14:00	Thailand	0–3	Pakistan	22–25	14–25	21–25			57–75	P2 Report
4 Jun	11:30	Kazakhstan	3–2	Thailand	25–21	22–25	25–23	19–25	15–13	106–107	P2 Report

=== Pool C ===
Pos	Team	Pld	W	L	Pts	SW	SL	SR	SPW	SPL	SPR	Qualification
1	South Korea	2	2	0	5	6	2	3.000	186	136	1.368	Quarterfinals
2	Qatar	2	1	1	4	5	3	1.667	175	160	1.094	Quarterfinals
3	Indonesia	2	0	2	0	0	6	0.000	85	150	0.567	9th–12th semifinals

Source: 2024 AVC Challenge Cup - Men

Date	Time		Score		Set 1	Set 2	Set 3	Set 4	Set 5	Total	Report
2 Jun	16:30	South Korea	3–0	Indonesia	25–11	25–16	25–9			75–36	P2 Report
3 Jun	16:30	Qatar	2–3	South Korea	16–25	25–19	16–25	25–22	18–20	100–111	P2 Report
4 Jun	14:00	Indonesia	0–3	Qatar	17–25	15–25	17–25			49–75	P2 Report

=== Pool D ===
Pos	Team	Pld	W	L	Pts	SW	SL	SR	SPW	SPL	SPR	Qualification
1	Australia	2	2	0	6	6	0	MAX	153	116	1.319	Quarterfinals
2	Vietnam	2	1	1	3	3	3	1.000	136	129	1.054	Quarterfinals
3	Chinese Taipei	2	0	2	0	0	6	0.000	106	150	0.707	9th–12th semifinals

Source: 2024 AVC Challenge Cup - Men

Date	Time		Score		Set 1	Set 2	Set 3	Set 4	Set 5	Total	Report
2 Jun	14:00	Australia	3–0	Chinese Taipei	25–21	25–17	25–17			75–55	P2 Report
3 Jun	11:30	Vietnam	0–3	Australia	18–25	17–25	26–28			61–78	P2 Report
4 Jun	16:30	Chinese Taipei	0–3	Vietnam	15–25	22–25	14–25			51–75	P2 Report

== Final round ==
- All times are Arabia Standard Time (UTC+03:00).

=== 9th–12th places ===
9th–12th semifinals
5 June
Philippines	3
Indonesia	1
5 June
Thailand	3
Chinese Taipei	0

9th place match
7 June
Philippines	1
Thailand	3
11th place match
7 June
Indonesia	3
Chinese Taipei	0

==== 9th–12th semifinals ====
Date	Time		Score		Set 1	Set 2	Set 3	Set 4	Set 5	Total	Report
5 Jun	16:30	Philippines	3–1	Indonesia	25–23	23–25	25–14	25–22		98–84	P2 Report
5 Jun	19:00	Thailand	3–0	Chinese Taipei	25–17	25–15	25–20			75–52	P2 Report

==== 11th place match ====
Date	Time		Score		Set 1	Set 2	Set 3	Set 4	Set 5	Total	Report
7 Jun	11:30	Indonesia	3–0	Chinese Taipei	26–24	25–21	27–25			78–70	P2 Report

==== 9th place match ====
Date	Time		Score		Set 1	Set 2	Set 3	Set 4	Set 5	Total	Report
7 Jun	14:00	Philippines	1–3	Thailand	20–25	25–23	22–25	20–25		87–98	P2 Report

=== Final eight ===
Quarterfinals
6 June
China	0
Qatar	3
6 June
Kazakhstan	3
Australia	1
6 June
Bahrain	2
South Korea	3
6 June
Pakistan	3
Vietnam	2

Semifinals
8 June
Qatar	3
Kazakhstan	1
8 June
South Korea	1
Pakistan	3

Final
9 June
Qatar	3
Pakistan	0
3rd place match
9 June
Kazakhstan	1
South Korea	3

5th–8th semifinals
7 June
China	3
Australia	2
7 June
Bahrain	1
Vietnam	3

5th place match
8 June
China	3
Vietnam	1
7th place match
8 June
Australia	0
Bahrain	3

==== Quarterfinals ====
Date	Time		Score		Set 1	Set 2	Set 3	Set 4	Set 5	Total	Report
6 Jun	11:30	China	0–3	Qatar	19–25	19–25	19–25			57–75	P2 Report
6 Jun	14:00	Kazakhstan	3–1	Australia	21–25	25–23	25–18	25–21		96–87	P2 Report
6 Jun	16:30	Pakistan	3–2	Vietnam	19–25	27–25	25–23	21–25	15–12	107–110	P2 Report
6 Jun	19:00	Bahrain	2–3	South Korea	24–26	30–32	25–22	25–22	12–15	116–117	P2 Report

==== 5th–8th semifinals ====
Date	Time		Score		Set 1	Set 2	Set 3	Set 4	Set 5	Total	Report
7 Jun	16:30	China	3–2	Australia	21–25	25–21	23–25	25–19	17–15	111–105	P2 Report
7 Jun	19:00	Bahrain	1–3	Vietnam	22–25	26–24	21–25	21–25		90–99	P2 Report

==== Semifinals ====
Date	Time		Score		Set 1	Set 2	Set 3	Set 4	Set 5	Total	Report
8 Jun	16:30	Qatar	3–1	Kazakhstan	25–16	19–25	25–19	25–16		94–76	P2 Report
8 Jun	19:00	South Korea	1–3	Pakistan	22–25	26–24	22–25	22–25		92–99	P2 Report

==== 7th place match ====
Date	Time		Score		Set 1	Set 2	Set 3	Set 4	Set 5	Total	Report
8 Jun	11:30	Australia	0–3	Bahrain	17–25	22–25	20–25			59–75	P2 Report

==== 5th place match ====
Date	Time		Score		Set 1	Set 2	Set 3	Set 4	Set 5	Total	Report
8 Jun	14:00	China	3–1	Vietnam	25–19	25–21	26–28	25–21		101–89	P2 Report

==== 3rd place match ====
Date	Time		Score		Set 1	Set 2	Set 3	Set 4	Set 5	Total	Report
9 Jun	16:00	Kazakhstan	1–3	South Korea	25–27	25–19	25–27	30–32		105–105	P2 Report

==== Final ====
Date	Time		Score		Set 1	Set 2	Set 3	Set 4	Set 5	Total	Report
9 Jun	19:00	Qatar	3–0	Pakistan	25–22	25–20	25–19			75–61	P2 Report

== Final standing ==
Rank	Team
1st place, gold medalist(s)	Qatar
2nd place, silver medalist(s)	Pakistan
3rd place, bronze medalist(s)	South Korea
4	Kazakhstan
5	China
6	Vietnam
7	Bahrain
8	Australia
9	Thailand
10	Philippines
11	Indonesia
12	Chinese Taipei

Qualified for the 2024 FIVB Challenger Cup
Qualified as hosts for the 2024 FIVB Challenger Cup

2024 Asian Challenge Cup champions

Qatar
First title

14–man roster
Youssef Oughlaf, Papemaguette Diagne, André Luiz Queiroz, Renan Ribeiro, Borislav Georgiev, Belal Nabel Abunabot, Waleed Widatalla, Ghanem Al-Remaihi, Nikola Vasić, Mubarak Dahi, Raimi Wadidie, Ibrahim Ibrahim (c), Ahmed Abdelrahim, Naji Mahmoud
Head coach
Camilo Andres Soto

== Awards ==
Renan Ribeiro was the 2024 AVC Challenge Cup Most Valuable Player

- Most valuable player
  Renan Ribeiro (QAT)
- Best setter
  Borislav Georgiev (QAT)
- Best outside spikers
  Raimi Wadidie (QAT)
  Kim Ji-han (KOR)
- Best middle blockers
  Ibrahim Ibrahim (QAT)
  Musawer Khan (PAK)
- Best opposite spiker
  Murad Khan (PAK)
- Best libero
  Nasir Ali (PAK)

== See also ==
- 2024 FIVB Men's Volleyball Challenger Cup
