= 2023 AVC Challenge Cup for Men =

Asian men's volleyball tournament

2023 AVC Men's Challenge Cup
2023年台中銀行亞洲男子排球挑戰盃
- Official logo

Tournament details
- Host country: Taiwan
- City: Taipei
- Dates: 8–15 July
- Teams: 15 (from 1 confederation)
- Venue: 2 (in 1 host city)

Final positions
- Champions: Thailand (1st title)
- Runners-up: Bahrain
- Third place: South Korea
- Fourth place: Vietnam

Tournament awards
- MVP: (Thailand) Anurak Phanram
- Best Setter: (South Korea) Hwang Taek-eui
- Best OH: (Thailand) Anut Promchan; (Bahrain) Mohamed Abdulla Yaqoob
- Best MB: (Thailand) Kissada Nilsawai; (South Korea) Kim Min-jae
- Best OPP: (Bahrain) Ali Khamis
- Best Libero: (Bahrain) Ayman Haroon

Tournament statistics
- Matches played: 33
- Attendance: 25,642 (777 per match)

The 2023 AVC Challenge Cup for Men, was the fourth edition of the AVC Challenge Cup for Men, an annual international volleyball tournament organised by the Asian Volleyball Confederation (AVC), in that year with the Chinese Taipei Volleyball Association (CTVBA). The tournament was held in Taipei, Taiwan from 8 to 15 July 2023.

The winners of the tournament qualified for the 2023 FIVB Men's Volleyball Challenger Cup.

Thailand won their first title and earned the right to participate in 2023 Challenger Cup after defeating Bahrain in straight sets in the final. South Korea took the bronze after defeating Vietnam in the 3rd place match. Anurak Phanram named as the MVP of the tournament.

== Team ==
=== Qualified teams ===
The following teams qualified for the tournament.

Country	Zone	Qualified as	Qualified on	Previous appearances			Previous best performance
Country	Zone	Qualified as	Qualified on	Total	First	Last	Previous best performance
Chinese Taipei	EAZVA	Host country	20 December 2022	0	None		None
Australia	OZVA	1st OZVA team	2 February 2023	0	None		None
Bahrain	WAZVA	1st WAZVA team	2 February 2023	0	None		None
Hong Kong	EAZVA	2nd EAZVA team	2 February 2023	0	None		None
India (Note: The Indian Ad-Hoc Committee did not allow their Indian men's team to participate in the tournament. As a result, India can still play their matches, but the results of the matches will be forfeited as requested by the Indian Ad-Hoc Committee.)	CAVA	3rd CAVA team	2 February 2023	0	None		None
Indonesia	SEAVA	2nd SEAVA team	2 February 2023	0	None		None
Kazakhstan	CAVA	2nd CAVA team	2 February 2023	0	None		None
Macau	EAZVA	3rd EAZVA team	2 February 2023	0	None		None
Mongolia	EAZVA	3rd EAZVA team	2 February 2023	2	2018	2022	4th place (2022)
~~Pakistan~~	~~CAVA~~	~~1st CAVA team~~	~~2 February 2023~~	~~0~~	~~None~~		~~None~~
Philippines	SEAVA	4th SEAVA team	2 February 2023	0	None		None
Saudi Arabia	WAZVA	2nd WAZVA team	2 February 2023	2	2018	2022	Runners-up (2018, 2022)
South Korea	EAZVA	1st EAZVA team	2 February 2023	0	None		None
Sri Lanka	CAVA	4th CAVA team	2 February 2023	1	2018		3rd place (2018)
Thailand	SEAVA	1st SEAVA team	2 February 2023	0	None		None
~~Uzbekistan~~	~~CAVA~~	~~5th CAVA team~~	~~2 February 2023~~	~~1~~	~~2022~~		~~3rd place (2022)~~
Vietnam	SEAVA	3rd SEAVA team	2 February 2023	0	None		None

== Pools composition ==
The overview of pools was released on 16 March 2023.

Pool A	Pool B	Pool C	Pool D	Pool E	Pool F
Chinese Taipei (Hosts)	Saudi Arabia (2)	~~Uzbekistan (3)~~*	Mongolia (4)	Australia (–)	Bahrain (–)
Kazakhstan (–)	Thailand (–)	India (–)	Philippines (–)	~~Pakistan (–)~~*	Sri Lanka (–)
—N/a	South Korea (–)	Hong Kong (–)	Macau (–)	Vietnam (–)	Indonesia (–)

* Pakistan and Uzbekistan withdrew from the tournament.

== Venues ==
Pool A, B, F, Final Round	Pool C, D, E, Final Round
Taipei, Taiwan
University of Taipei Gymnasium (Court 1)	Taipei Gymnasium (Court 2)
Capacity: 4,500	Capacity: 2,400

== Format ==
Teams are divided into six pools. Last placed teams in pools B, C, F play for 13th to 15th places. The second-ranked teams in each pool were drawn to pair with the first-ranked teams in each pool. Top six advances to next round while losers relegated to 7th–12th places.

== Pool standing procedure ==
1. Total number of victories (matches won, matches lost)
2. In the event of a tie, the following first tiebreaker will apply: The teams will be ranked by the most point gained per match as follows:
  - Match won 3–0 or 3–1: 3 points for the winner, 0 points for the loser
  - Match won 3–2: 2 points for the winner, 1 point for the loser
  - Match forfeited: 3 points for the winner, 0 points (0–25, 0–25, 0–25) for the loser
3. If teams are still tied after examining the number of victories and points gained, then the AVC will examine the results in order to break the tie in the following order:
  - Set quotient: if two or more teams are tied on the number of points gained, they will be ranked by the quotient resulting from the division of the number of all set won by the number of all sets lost.
  - Points quotient: if the tie persists based on the set quotient, the teams will be ranked by the quotient resulting from the division of all points scored by the total of points lost during all sets.
  - If the tie persists based on the point quotient, the tie will be broken based on the team that won the match of the Round Robin Phase between the tied teams. When the tie in point quotient is between three or more teams, these teams ranked taking into consideration only the matches involving the teams in question.

== Preliminary round ==
- All times are Taiwan Time (UTC+08:00).

=== Pool A ===
Pos	Team	Pld	W	L	Pts	SW	SL	SR	SPW	SPL	SPR	Qualification
1	Chinese Taipei (H)	1	1	0	3	3	1	3.000	96	77	1.247	Final twelve
2	Kazakhstan	1	0	1	0	1	3	0.333	77	96	0.802	Final twelve

Source: Daily Bulletin 2 AVC Challenge Cup 2023
(H) Host

Date	Time	Venue		Score		Set 1	Set 2	Set 3	Set 4	Set 5	Total	Report
8 Jul	17:30	Court 1	Chinese Taipei	3–1	Kazakhstan	25–17	21–25	25–12	25–23		96–77	Report

=== Pool B ===
Pos	Team	Pld	W	L	Pts	SW	SL	SR	SPW	SPL	SPR	Qualification
1	South Korea	2	2	0	6	6	0	MAX	150	118	1.271	Final twelve
2	Thailand	2	1	1	3	3	3	1.000	133	128	1.039	Final twelve
3	Saudi Arabia	2	0	2	0	0	6	0.000	113	150	0.753	13th–15th places

Source: Daily Bulletin 4 AVC Challenge Cup 2023

Date	Time	Venue		Score		Set 1	Set 2	Set 3	Set 4	Set 5	Total	Report
8 Jul	10:00	Court 1	South Korea	3–0	Thailand	25–20	25–15	25–23			75–58	Report
9 Jul	12:30	Court 1	Saudi Arabia	0–3	South Korea	17–25	20–25	23–25			60–75	Report
10 Jul	12:30	Court 1	Thailand	3–0	Saudi Arabia	25–20	25–16	25–17			75–53	Report

=== Pool C ===
Pos	Team	Pld	W	L	Pts	SW	SL	SR	SPW	SPL	SPR	Qualification
1	Hong Kong	1	1	0	3	3	0	MAX	75	0	MAX	Final twelve
2	India	1	0	1	0	0	3	0.000	0	75	0.000	13th–15th places

Date	Time	Venue		Score		Set 1	Set 2	Set 3	Set 4	Set 5	Total	Report
9 Jul	15:00	Court 2	Hong Kong	3–0	India	25–0	25–0	25–0			75–0	(Note: The match was originally a 3–0 win for India (25–22, 25–18, 25–17).)

=== Pool D ===
Pos	Team	Pld	W	L	Pts	SW	SL	SR	SPW	SPL	SPR	Qualification
1	Philippines	2	2	0	5	6	2	3.000	186	157	1.185	Final twelve
2	Mongolia	2	1	1	4	5	3	1.667	182	164	1.110	Final twelve
3	Macau	2	0	2	0	0	6	0.000	103	150	0.687	Final twelve

Source: Daily Bulletin 4 AVC Challenge Cup 2023

Date	Time	Venue		Score		Set 1	Set 2	Set 3	Set 4	Set 5	Total	Report
8 Jul	10:00	Court 2	Macau	0–3	Mongolia	14–25	20–25	19–25			53–75	Report
9 Jul	10:00	Court 2	Philippines	3–0	Macau	25–21	25–15	25–14			75–50	Report
10 Jul	10:00	Court 2	Mongolia	2–3	Philippines	25–22	21–25	24–26	25–23	12–15	107–111	Report

=== Pool E ===
Pos	Team	Pld	W	L	Pts	SW	SL	SR	SPW	SPL	SPR	Qualification
1	Australia	1	1	0	3	3	1	3.000	108	94	1.149	Final twelve
2	Vietnam	1	0	1	0	1	3	0.333	94	108	0.870	Final twelve

Source: Daily Bulletin 3 AVC Challenge Cup 2023

Date	Time	Venue		Score		Set 1	Set 2	Set 3	Set 4	Set 5	Total	Report
9 Jul	12:30	Court 2	Vietnam	1–3	Australia	23–25	16–25	35–33	20–25		94–108	Report

=== Pool F ===
Pos	Team	Pld	W	L	Pts	SW	SL	SR	SPW	SPL	SPR	Qualification
1	Indonesia	2	2	0	5	6	3	2.000	214	199	1.075	Final twelve
2	Bahrain	2	1	1	4	5	4	1.250	222	217	1.023	Final twelve
3	Sri Lanka	2	0	2	0	2	6	0.333	180	200	0.900	13th–15th places

Source: Daily Bulletin 4 AVC Challenge Cup 2023

Date	Time	Venue		Score		Set 1	Set 2	Set 3	Set 4	Set 5	Total	Report
8 Jul	12:30	Court 1	Sri Lanka	1–3	Indonesia	21–25	19–25	25–20	17–25		82–95	Report
9 Jul	15:00	Court 1	Bahrain	3–1	Sri Lanka	28–26	25–20	26–28	26–24		105–98	Report
10 Jul	15:00	Court 1	Indonesia	3–2	Bahrain	33–31	25–27	21–25	25–23	15–11	119–117	Report

== Final round ==
- All times are Taiwan Time (UTC+08:00).

=== 13th–15th places ===
Pos	Team	Pld	W	L	Pts	SW	SL	SR	SPW	SPL	SPR
13	Sri Lanka	2	2	0	6	6	0	MAX	150	46	3.261
14	Saudi Arabia	2	1	1	3	3	3	1.000	121	75	1.613
15	India	2	0	2	0	0	6	0.000	0	150	0.000

Source: Daily Bulletin 6 AVC Challenge Cup 2023

Date	Time	Venue		Score		Set 1	Set 2	Set 3	Set 4	Set 5	Total	Report
13 Jul	10:00	Court 2	Sri Lanka	3–0	Saudi Arabia	25–15	25–17	25–14			75–46	Report

=== Final twelve ===
Round of 12
12 July
Chinese Taipei	1
Vietnam	3
12 July
Indonesia	3
Kazakhstan	0
12 July
Hong Kong	1
Thailand	3
12 July
South Korea	3
Mongolia	0
12 July
Philippines	0
Bahrain	3
12 July
Australia	3
Macau	0

Quarterfinals
13 July
Indonesia	2
Thailand	3
13 July
Bahrain	3
Australia	1

Semifinals
14 July
Vietnam	1
Thailand	3
14 July
South Korea	0
Bahrain	3

Final
15 July
Thailand	3
Bahrain	0
3rd place match
15 July
Vietnam	1
South Korea	3

5th place match
15 July
Indonesia	1
Australia	3

7th–12th places
13 July
Kazakhstan	3
Hong Kong	0
13 July
Philippines	3
Macau	0

7th–10th places
14 July
Chinese Taipei	0
Kazakhstan	3
14 July
Mongolia	3
Philippines	2

7th place match
15 July
Kazakhstan	3
Mongolia	0
9th place match
15 July
Chinese Taipei	3
Philippines	1

11th place match
14 July
Hong Kong	3
Macau	0

==== Round of 12 ====
Date	Time	Venue		Score		Set 1	Set 2	Set 3	Set 4	Set 5	Total	Report
12 Jul	10:00	Court 1	Philippines	0–3	Bahrain	20–25	17–25	23–25			60–75	Report
12 Jul	12:30	Court 1	South Korea	3–0	Mongolia	25–16	25–21	25–20			75–57	Report
12 Jul	15:00	Court 1	Indonesia	3–0	Kazakhstan	30–28	25–21	25–15			80–64	Report
12 Jul	15:00	Court 2	Australia	3–0	Macau	25–10	25–13	25–8			75–31	Report
12 Jul	17:30	Court 1	Chinese Taipei	1–3	Vietnam	20–25	25–23	19–25	15–25		79–98	Report
12 Jul	17:30	Court 2	Hong Kong	1–3	Thailand	25–15	8–25	22–25	11–25		66–90	Report

==== 7th–12th places ====
Date	Time	Venue		Score		Set 1	Set 2	Set 3	Set 4	Set 5	Total	Report
13 Jul	12:30	Court 2	Kazakhstan	3–0	Hong Kong	25–18	25–16	25–15			75–49	Report
13 Jul	15:00	Court 2	Philippines	3–0	Macau	25–15	25–16	25–17			75–48	Report

==== Quarterfinals ====
Date	Time	Venue		Score		Set 1	Set 2	Set 3	Set 4	Set 5	Total	Report
13 Jul	12:30	Court 1	Indonesia	2–3	Thailand	20–25	27–25	25–20	16–25	12–15	100–110	Report
13 Jul	15:00	Court 1	Bahrain	3–1	Australia	25–19	25–22	18–25	25–18		93–84	Report

==== 7th–10th places ====
Date	Time	Venue		Score		Set 1	Set 2	Set 3	Set 4	Set 5	Total	Report
14 Jul	17:30	Court 1	Chinese Taipei	0–3	Kazakhstan	22–25	23–25	23–25			68–75	Report
14 Jul	17:30	Court 2	Mongolia	3–2	Philippines	17–25	23–25	25–23	25–22	15–12	105–107	Report

==== Semifinals ====
Date	Time	Venue		Score		Set 1	Set 2	Set 3	Set 4	Set 5	Total	Report
14 Jul	12:30	Court 1	Vietnam	1–3	Thailand	25–20	13–25	22–25	15–25		75–95	Report
14 Jul	15:00	Court 1	South Korea	0–3	Bahrain	33–35	23–25	20–25			76–85	Report

==== 11th place match ====
Date	Time	Venue		Score		Set 1	Set 2	Set 3	Set 4	Set 5	Total	Report
14 Jul	15:00	Court 2	Hong Kong	3–0	Macau	25–16	25–18	25–20			75–54	Report

==== 9th place match ====
Date	Time	Venue		Score		Set 1	Set 2	Set 3	Set 4	Set 5	Total	Report
15 Jul	12:30	Court 2	Chinese Taipei	3–1	Philippines	25–22	25–17	26–28	25–22		101–89	Report

==== 7th place match ====
Date	Time	Venue		Score		Set 1	Set 2	Set 3	Set 4	Set 5	Total	Report
15 Jul	15:00	Court 2	Kazakhstan	3–0	Mongolia	25–16	25–16	25–20			75–52	Report

==== 5th place match ====
Date	Time	Venue		Score		Set 1	Set 2	Set 3	Set 4	Set 5	Total	Report
15 Jul	10:00	Court 1	Indonesia	1–3	Australia	20–25	18–25	25–19	16–25		79–94	Report

==== 3rd place match ====
Date	Time	Venue		Score		Set 1	Set 2	Set 3	Set 4	Set 5	Total	Report
15 Jul	12:30	Court 1	Vietnam	1–3	South Korea	22–25	19–25	25–22	21–25		87–97	Report

==== Final ====
Date	Time	Venue		Score		Set 1	Set 2	Set 3	Set 4	Set 5	Total	Report
15 Jul	15:00	Court 1	Thailand	3–0	Bahrain	25–20	25–20	25–16			75–56	Report

== Final standing ==
Rank	Team
1st place, gold medalist(s)	Thailand
2nd place, silver medalist(s)	Bahrain
3rd place, bronze medalist(s)	South Korea
4	Vietnam
5	Australia
6	Indonesia
7	Kazakhstan
8	Mongolia
9	Chinese Taipei
10	Philippines
11	Hong Kong
12	Macau
13	Sri Lanka
14	Saudi Arabia
15	India

Qualified for the 2023 FIVB Challenger Cup

2023 Asian Challenge Cup champions

Thailand
First title

14–man roster
Anut Promchan, Takorn Chuaymee, Prasert Pinkaew, Napadet Bhinijdee, Boonyarid Wongtorn, Siwadon Sanhatham, Thanathat Thaweerat, Mawin Maneewong, Tanapat Charoensuk, Christopher Arli Upakam, Chayut Khongrueng, Anurak Phanram, Assanaphan Chantajorn, Kissada Nilsawai
Head coach
Park Ki-won

== Awards ==
Anurak Phanram was the 2023 AVC Challenge Cup Most Valuable Player

- Most valuable player
  Anurak Phanram (THA)
- Best setter
  Hwang Taek-eui (KOR)
- Best outside spikers
  Anut Promchan (THA)
  Mohamed Abdulla Yaqoob (BHR)
- Best middle blockers
  Kissada Nilsawai (THA)
  Kim Min-jae (KOR)
- Best opposite spiker
  Ali Khamis (BHR)
- Best libero
  Ayman Haroon (BHR)

== See also ==
- 2023 FIVB Men's Volleyball Challenger Cup
- List of sporting events in Taiwan
