= India men's national volleyball team results =

The following are the India men's national volleyball team results at FIVB sanctioned tournaments such as Olympic Games, World Championship, World Cup, World Grand Champions Cup and Nations League (formerly World League) and AVC sanctioned tournaments such as Asian Games, Men's Championship, Men's Volleyball Cup and CAVA Men's Nations League.

== 20th century ==
=== 1950s ===
Date	Time		Score		Set 1	Set 2	Set 3	Set 4	Set 5	Total	Event	Location	Report
19-08-1952	--:--	France	3–0	India	15–9	15–3	15–7			45–19	1952 World; Cup	(Soviet Union); Moscow	
20-08-1952	--:--	Czechia	3–0	India	15–10	15–3	15–8			45–21	1952 World; Cup	(Soviet Union); Moscow	
22-08-1952	--:--	Poland	3–0	India	15–12	15–7	16–14			46–33	1952 World; Cup	(Soviet Union); Moscow	
23-08-1952	--:--	India	3–0	Finland	15–4	15–1	15–4			45–9	1952 World; Cup	(Soviet Union); Moscow	
24-08-1952	--:--	India	3–0	Lebanon	15–7	15–11	15–12			45–30	1952 World; Cup	(Soviet Union); Moscow	
25-08-1952	--:--	India	3–0	Israel	15–6	15–3	15–9			45–18	1952 World; Cup	(Soviet Union); Moscow	
30-08-1956	--:--	Brazil	3–2	India	6–15	15–6	15–8	11–15	15–4	62–48	1956 World; Cup	(France); Paris	
1-09-1956	--:--	China	3–1	India	15–5	15–9	10–15	15–7		55–36	1956 World; Cup	(France); Paris	
2-09-1956	--:--	India	3–0	West Germany	15–0	15–2	15–5			45–7	1956 World; Cup	(France); Paris	
3-09-1956	--:--	India	3–0	Luxembourg	15–1	15–2	15–2			45–5	1956 World; Cup	(France); Paris	
5-09-1956	--:--	India	3–0	Turkey	15–6	15–6	15–6			45–18	1956 World; Cup	(France); Paris	
25-05-1958	--:--	Hong Kong	0–3	India	10–15	12–15	13–15			35–45	1958 Asian; Games	(Japan); Tokyo	
27-05-1958	--:--	India	1–3	Iran	14–16	11–15	15–9	8–15		48–55	1958 Asian; Games	(Japan); Tokyo	
30-05-1958	--:--	India	3–0	Philippines	15–3	15–9	15–1			45–13	1958 Asian; Games	(Japan); Tokyo	
31-05-1958	--:--	Japan	3–1	India	16–14	15–13	5–15	15–10		51–52	1958 Asian; Games	(Japan); Tokyo	

=== 1960s ===
Date	Time		Score		Set 1	Set 2	Set 3	Set 4	Set 5	Total	Event	Location	Report
25-08-1962	--:--	India	3–0	Burma	15–9	15–3	15–10			45–22	1962 Asian; Games	(Indonesia); Jakarta	
26-08-1962	--:--	India	3–0	Cambodia	15–10	15–6	15–5			45–21	1962 Asian; Games	(Indonesia); Jakarta	
29-08-1962	--:--	India	3–2	Pakistan	15–13	8–15	13–15	16–14	15–7	67–64	1962 Asian; Games	(Indonesia); Jakarta	
30-08-1962	--:--	India	3–0	Burma	15–3	15–8	15–11			45–22	1962 Asian; Games	(Indonesia); Jakarta	
31-08-1962	--:--	India	2–3	Japan	15–9	6–15	15–9	8–15	12–15	56–63	1962 Asian; Games	(Indonesia); Jakarta	
1-09-1962	--:--	Indonesia	1–3	India	9–15	15–13	4–15	8–15		36–58	1962 Asian; Games	(Indonesia); Jakarta	
2-09-1962	--:--	India	3–0	South Korea	15–12	15–13	17–15			47–40	1962 Asian; Games	(Indonesia); Jakarta	
10-12-1966	--:--	India	3–1	Philippines	Unknown						1966 Asian; Games	(Thailand); Bangkok	
11-12-1966	--:--	India	3–0	Malaysia	15–2	15–3	15–9			45–14	1966 Asian; Games	(Thailand); Bangkok	
12-12-1966	--:--	Thailand	0–3	India	Unknown						1966 Asian; Games	(Thailand); Bangkok	
13-12-1966	--:--	India	3–2	Indonesia	Unknown						1966 Asian; Games	(Thailand); Bangkok	
15-12-1966	--:--	India	1–3	Iran	10–15	15–6	6–15	14–16		45–52	1966 Asian; Games	(Thailand); Bangkok	
16-12-1966	--:--	India	3–0	Thailand	Unknown						1966 Asian; Games	(Thailand); Bangkok	
17-12-1966	--:--	India	0–3	Japan	5–15	1–15	0–15			6–45	1966 Asian; Games	(Thailand); Bangkok	
18-12-1966	--:--	India	0–3	South Korea	Unknown						1966 Asian; Games	(Thailand); Bangkok	

=== 1970s ===
Date	Time		Score		Set 1	Set 2	Set 3	Set 4	Set 5	Total	Event	Location	Report
2-09-1974	16:00	India	0–3	China	3–15	6–15	5–15			14–45	1974 Asian; Games	(Iran); Tehran	
4-09-1974	17:30	Japan	3–0	India	15–6	15–6	15–10			45–22	1974 Asian; Games	(Iran); Tehran	
6-09-1974	10:00	India	3–1	Philippines	8–15	15–2	15–3	15–9		53–29	1974 Asian; Games	(Iran); Tehran	
8-09-1974	18:30	India	3–0	Kuwait	15–4	15–2	15–6			45–12	1974 Asian; Games	(Iran); Tehran	
11-09-1974	17:30	India	3–1	Philippines	15–2	3–15	15–6	15–1		58–24	1974 Asian; Games	(Iran); Tehran	
10-12-1978	--:--	South Korea	3–0	India	Unknown						1978 Asian; Games	(Thailand); Bangkok	
11-12-1978	--:--	India	3–0	Bahrain	Unknown						1978 Asian; Games	(Thailand); Bangkok	
13-12-1978	--:--	China	3–0	India	Unknown						1978 Asian; Games	(Thailand); Bangkok	
16-12-1978	--:--	India	3–0	UAE	Unknown						1978 Asian; Games	(Thailand); Bangkok	
19-12-1978	--:--	India	3–0	Saudi Arabia	Unknown						1978 Asian; Games	(Thailand); Bangkok	
17-12-1979	--:--	India	3–0	Saudi Arabia	15–9	15–3	15–7			45–19	1979 Asian; Championship	(Bahrain); Manama	
18-12-1979	--:--	Lebanon	0–3	India	13–15	1–15	2–15			16–45	1979 Asian; Championship	(Bahrain); Manama	
19-12-1979	--:--	China	3–0	India	15–3	15–3	15–4			45–10	1979 Asian; Championship	(Bahrain); Manama	
21-12-1979	--:--	India	3–0	Kuwait	15–4	15–5	15–1			45–10	1979 Asian; Championship	(Bahrain); Manama	
22-12-1979	--:--	India	3–0	Iraq	15–10	15–4	15–8			45–22	1979 Asian; Championship	(Bahrain); Manama	
23-12-1979	--:--	Iran	1–3	India	Unknown						1979 Asian; Championship	(Bahrain); Manama	

=== 1980s ===
Date	Time		Score		Set 1	Set 2	Set 3	Set 4	Set 5	Total	Event	Location	Report
20-11-1982	--:--	India	3–0	Bangladesh	15–1	15–1	15–2			45–4	1982 Asian; Games	(India); New Delhi	
23-11-1982	--:--	India	3–1	Indonesia	15–8	4–15	16–14	15–12		50–49	1982 Asian; Games	(India); New Delhi	
25-11-1982	--:--	India	3–1	Saudi Arabia	15–12	11–15	16–14	15–6		57–47	1982 Asian; Games	(India); New Delhi	
29-11-1982	--:--	India	0–3	Japan	1–15	3–15	9–15			13–45	1982 Asian; Games	(India); New Delhi	
2-12-1982	--:--	India	0–3	China	12–15	7–15	3–15			22–45	1982 Asian; Games	(India); New Delhi	
3-12-1982	--:--	India	0–3	South Korea	6–15	4–15	15–17			25–47	1982 Asian; Games	(India); New Delhi	
24-11-1983	--:--	India	3–1	Australia	10–15	15–7	15–9	15–2		55–33	1983 Asian; Championship	(Japan); Tokyo	
25-11-1983	--:--	Chinese Taipei	3–1	India	15–4	12–15	15–12	15–13		57–44	1983 Asian; Championship	(Japan); Tokyo	
26-11-1983	--:--	Japan	3–0	India	15–8	15–3	15–0			45–12	1983 Asian; Championship	(Japan); Tokyo	
27-11-1983	--:--	India	3–0	Indonesia	15–12	15–6	15–9			45–27	1983 Asian; Championship	(Japan); Tokyo	
29-11-1983	--:--	India	3–0	Kuwait	15–12	15–12	15–9			45–33	1983 Asian; Championship	(Japan); Tokyo	
30-11-1983	--:--	India	3–0	New Zealand	15–4	15–5	15–5			45–14	1983 Asian; Championship	(Japan); Tokyo	
1-12-1983	--:--	India	3–?	Australia	Unknown						1983 Asian; Championship	(Japan); Tokyo	
21-09-1986	--:--	India	3–0	Hong Kong	15–6	15–4	15–5			45–15	1986 Asian; Games	(South Korea); Seoul	
22-09-1986	--:--	India	3–0	Bahrain	15–2	15–4	15–8			45–14	1986 Asian; Games	(South Korea); Seoul	
23-09-1986	--:--	Saudi Arabia	1–3	India	8–15	6–15	15–12	7–15		36–57	1986 Asian; Games	(South Korea); Seoul	
24-09-1986	--:--	India	3–0	Indonesia	15–10	15–5	15–5			45–20	1986 Asian; Games	(South Korea); Seoul	
25-09-1986	--:--	South Korea	3–0	India	15–9	15–11	15–5			45–25	1986 Asian; Games	(South Korea); Seoul	
1-10-1986	--:--	India	3–0	Japan	15–8	15–11	15–6			45–25	1986 Asian; Games	(South Korea); Seoul	
2-10-1986	--:--	South Korea	3–0	India	15–2	15–8	15–11			45–20	1986 Asian; Games	(South Korea); Seoul	
4-10-1986	--:--	India	0–3	China	3–15	5–15	8–15			16–45	1986 Asian; Games	(South Korea); Seoul	
17-10-1987	--:--	India	3–0	Iran	15–9	15–8	15–9			45–26	1987 Asian; Championship	Kuwait City	
18-10-1987	--:--	China	3–0	India	16–14	15–13	15–11			46–38	1987 Asian; Championship	Kuwait City	
19-10-1987	--:--	India	3–0	Thailand	15–5	15–2	15–7			45–14	1987 Asian; Championship	Kuwait City	
22-10-1987	--:--	Kuwait	3–?	India	Unknown						1987 Asian; Championship	Kuwait City	
23-10-1987	--:--	India	3–?	Bahrain	Unknown						1987 Asian; Championship	Kuwait City	
24-10-1987	--:--	India	3–0	Pakistan	15–4	15–5	15–9			45–18	1987 Asian; Championship	Kuwait City	
25-10-1987	--:--	India	3–?	Chinese Taipei	Unknown						1987 Asian; Championship	Kuwait City	
16-09-1989	--:--	India	3–0	Hong Kong	15–5	15–3	15–2			45–10	1989 Asian; Championship	(South Korea); Seoul	
18-09-1989	--:--	India	3–0	Kuwait	15–8	15–8	15–11			45–27	1989 Asian; Championship	(South Korea); Seoul	
19-09-1989	--:--	India	3–0	Sri Lanka	15–6	15–5	15–2			45–13	1989 Asian; Championship	(South Korea); Seoul	
21-09-1989	--:--	Pakistan	3–1	India	8–15	16–14	15–12	15–13		54–54	1989 Asian; Championship	(South Korea); Seoul	
22-09-1989	--:--	Japan	3–0	India	15–10	15–8	15–4			45–22	1989 Asian; Championship	(South Korea); Seoul	
23-09-1989	--:--	India	3–0	Iran	Unknown						1989 Asian; Championship	(South Korea); Seoul	
24-09-1989	--:--	Kuwait	3–1	India	15–11	10–15	15–11	15–4		55–42	1989 Asian; Championship	(South Korea); Seoul	

=== 1990s ===
Date	Time		Score		Set 1	Set 2	Set 3	Set 4	Set 5	Total	Event	Location	Report
11-08-1991	--:--	India	3–0	Saudi Arabia	15–?	15–5	16–14			45–?	1991 Asian; Championship	(Australia); Perth	
12-08-1991	--:--	Japan	3–0	India	15–3	15–10	15–?			45–?	1991 Asian; Championship	(Australia); Perth	
13-08-1991	--:--	Indonesia	3–1	India	15–13	11–15	15–9	15–10		56–47	1991 Asian; Championship	(Australia); Perth	
14-08-1991	--:--	India	3–0	New Zealand	15–5	15–11	15–5			45–35	1991 Asian; Championship	(Australia); Perth	
15-08-1991	--:--	Thailand	3–2	India	15–4	15–13	9–15	4–15	15–11	58–58	1991 Asian; Championship	(Australia); Perth	
13-09-1993	--:--	South Korea	3–0	India	15–3	15–13	15–6			45–22	1993 Asian; Championship	(Thailand); Nakhon; Ratchasima	
14-09-1993	--:--	Kazakhstan	3–0	India	Unknown						1993 Asian; Championship	(Thailand); Nakhon; Ratchasima	
15-09-1993	--:--	India	3–2	Chinese Taipei	3–15	15–6	8–15	15–7	15–4	56–47	1993 Asian; Championship	(Thailand); Nakhon; Ratchasima	
3-09-1997	--:--	India	2–3	Thailand	7–15	15–2	15–1	10–15	12–15	59–48	1997 Asian; Championship	(Qatar); Doha	
4-09-1997	--:--	UAE	?–3	India	Unknown						1997 Asian; Championship	(Qatar); Doha	
5-09-1997	--:--	India	3–?	Pakistan	Unknown						1997 Asian; Championship	(Qatar); Doha	
7-09-1997	--:--	Bahrain	?–3	India	Unknown						1997 Asian; Championship	(Qatar); Doha	
8-09-1997	--:--	Saudi Arabia	?–3	India	Unknown						1997 Asian; Championship	(Qatar); Doha	
7-12-1998	--:--	India	0–3	China	9–15	7–15	11–15			27–45	1998 Asian; Games	(Thailand); Muangthong	
8-12-1998	--:--	India	0–3	Japan	3–15	4–15	6–15			14–45	1998 Asian; Games	(Thailand); Muangthong	
9-12-1998	--:--	Kazakhstan	0–3	India	11–15	7–15	9–15			27–45	1998 Asian; Games	(Thailand); Muangthong	
12-12-1998	--:--	India	3–0	Pakistan	15–4	15–7	15–11			45–22	1998 Asian; Games	(Thailand); Muangthong	
13-12-1998	--:--	India	0–3	Indonesia	12–15	5–15	14–16			31–46	1998 Asian; Games	(Thailand); Muangthong	
14-12-1998	--:--	Kazakhstan	0–3	India	6–15	0–15	11–15			17–45	1998 Asian; Games	(Thailand); Muangthong	
2-09-1999	18:00	Bahrain	1–3	India	21–25	25–23	24–26	19–25		89–99	1999 Asian; Championship	(Iran); Tehran	
3-09-1999	15:30	Japan	3–0	India	25–18	25–21	25–19			75–58	1999 Asian; Championship	(Iran); Tehran	
4-09-1999	17:30	India	0–3	South Korea	19–25	16–25	17–25			55–75	1999 Asian; Championship	(Iran); Tehran	
6-09-1999	15:00	Qatar	1–3	India	19–25	25–22	16–25	23–25		83–97	1999 Asian; Championship	(Iran); Tehran	
8-09-1999	15:00	India	3–0	Sri Lanka	25–14	25–21	25–14			75–49	1999 Asian; Championship	(Iran); Tehran	
9-09-1999	11:00	India	3–0	Kazakhstan	25–19	25–23	25–14			75–56	1999 Asian; Championship	(Iran); Tehran	

== 21st century ==
=== 2000s ===
Date	Time		Score		Set 1	Set 2	Set 3	Set 4	Set 5	Total	Event	Location	Report
10-08-2001	--:--	India	3–1	Chinese Taipei	25–13	23–25	25–23	25–19		98–80	2002 World Cup; Qualification	(Kazakhstan); Almaty	
11-08-2001	--:--	Qatar	3–1	India	17–25	19–25	25–23	14–25		75–98	2002 World Cup; Qualification	(Kazakhstan); Almaty	
11-08-2001	--:--	Japan	3–1	India	22–25	25–20	25–23	25–21		97–89	2002 World Cup; Qualification	(Kazakhstan); Almaty	
9-09-2001	11:30	China	3–2	India	22–25	25–19	25–20	21–25	15–12	108–101	2001 Asian; Championship	(South Korea); Changwon	
11-09-2001	11:30	India	3–1	Qatar	25–20	25–15	23–25	25–21		98–81	2001 Asian; Championship	(South Korea); Changwon	
12-09-2001	11:30	Japan	3–0	India	25–22	25–18	26–24			76–64	2001 Asian; Championship	(South Korea); Changwon	
13-09-2001	19:30	India	2–3	Iran	18–25	13–25	25–23	25–21	13–15	94–109	2001 Asian; Championship	(South Korea); Changwon	
15-09-2001	18:00	Chinese Taipei	3–0	India	25–20	26–24	25–20			76–64	2001 Asian; Championship	(South Korea); Changwon	
16-09-2001	14:00	India	3–2	Saudi Arabia	30–32	25–22	25–16	22–25	16–14	118–109	2001 Asian; Championship	(South Korea); Changwon	
2-10-2002	16:00	South Korea	3–0	India	25–22	25–17	27–25			77–64	2002 Asian; Games	(South Korea); Busan	
3-10-2002	16:00	India	2–3	Iran	20–25	23–25	39–37	28–26	12–15	122–128	2002 Asian; Games	(South Korea); Busan	
4-10-2002	12:00	Macau	0–3	India	13–25	16–25	21–25			50–75	2002 Asian; Games	(South Korea); Busan	
8-10-2002	10:00	India	3–0	Qatar	25–22	25–17	25–14			75–53	2002 Asian; Games	(South Korea); Busan	
10-10-2002	12:00	India	3–0	Pakistan	25–15	25–17	25–15			75–47	2002 Asian; Games	(South Korea); Busan	
12-10-2002	14:00	Chinese Taipei	1–3	India	23–25	21–25	25–18	32–34		101–102	2002 Asian; Games	(South Korea); Busan	
5-09-2003	--:--	South Korea	2–3	India	25–23	22–25	25–20	22–25	15–17	109–110	2003 Asian; Championship	(China); Tianjin	
6-09-2003	--:--	India	3–1	Bahrain	22–25	25–16	25–23	25–16		97–80	2003 Asian; Championship	(China); Tianjin	
7-09-2003	16:00	Thailand	1–3	India	19–25	18–25	25–22	17–25		79–97	2003 Asian; Championship	(China); Tianjin	
8-09-2003	--:--	India	1–3	Japan	22–25	21–23	25–25	21–25		89–98	2003 Asian; Championship	(China); Tianjin	
9-09-2003	21:00	Iran	3–2	India	25–23	20–25	22–25	25–23	15–13	107–109	2003 Asian; Championship	(China); Tianjin	
11-09-2003	--:--	India	3–0	Kazakhstan	27–25	25–21	25–17			77–63	2003 Asian; Championship	(China); Tianjin	
12-09-2003	--:--	Pakistan	0–3	India	22–25	20–25	17–25			59–75	2003 Asian; Championship	(China); Tianjin	
24-06-2005	17:00	India	3–2	Indonesia	24–26	25–20	25–23	21–25	15–13	110–107	2006 World Cup; Qualification	(India); Chennai	Report
25-06-2005	17:00	India	3–0	Thailand	28–26	25–21	25–18			75–51	2006 World Cup; Qualification	(India); Chennai	Report
26-06-2005	17:00	China	3–0	India	25–23	25–21	25–21			75–65	2006 World Cup; Qualification	(India); Chennai	Report
2-07-2005	17:00	India	0–3	Australia	18–25	17–25	17–25			52–75	2006 World Cup; Qualification	(India); Chennai	Report
3-07-2005	17:00	India	2–3	South Korea	25–23	18–25	25–23	19–25	12–15	52–75	2006 World Cup; Qualification	(India); Chennai	Report
21-09-2005	16:00	India	3–0	Bahrain	25–19	22–22	25–22			75–63	2005 Asian; Championship	(Thailand); Suphan Buri	
22-09-2005	16:00	Chinese Taipei	0–3	India	23–25	24–26	15–25			62–76	2005 Asian; Championship	(Thailand); Suphan Buri	
23-09-2005	16:00	China	3–2	India	25–21	22–25	24–26	26–24	16–14	113–110	2005 Asian; Championship	(Thailand); Suphan Buri	
24-09-2005	18:00	Thailand	0–3	India	22–25	14–25	21–25			57–75	2005 Asian; Championship	(Thailand); Suphan Buri	
25-09-2005	12:00	Qatar	0–3	India	23–25	12–25	23–25			58–75	2005 Asian; Championship	(Thailand); Suphan Buri	
26-09-2005	18:00	Japan	3–0	India	25–17	25–23	36–34			86–74	2005 Asian; Championship	(Thailand); Suphan Buri	
27-09-2005	16:00	South Korea	3–1	India	25–20	25–18	22–25	25–16		97–79	2005 Asian; Championship	(Thailand); Suphan Buri	
3-12-2006	20:00	India	3–0	Lebanon	25–18	39–37	25–23			89–78	2006 Asian; Games	(Qatar); Doha	
4-12-2006	20:00	Saudi Arabia	3–1	India	25–21	25–22	23–25	25–23		98–91	2006 Asian; Games	(Qatar); Doha	
7-12-2006	12:00	India	3–0	Kuwait	25–17	25–16	25–18			75–51	2006 Asian; Games	(Qatar); Doha	
9-12-2006	14:00	UAE	0–3	India	12–25	14–25	19–25			45–75	2006 Asian; Games	(Qatar); Doha	
31-08-2007	14:45	Australia	3–1	India	22–25	25–19	25–18	25–23		97–85	2007 Asian; Championship	(Indonesia); Jakarta	
1-09-2007	16:00	India	3–2	Kazakhstan	25–20	24–19	25–18	25–23	18-16	117–109	2007 Asian; Championship	(Indonesia); Jakarta	
2-09-2007	16:00	Kuwait	0–3	India	19–25	22–25	17–25			58–75	2007 Asian; Championship	(Indonesia); Jakarta	
3-09-2007	18:15	India	3–0	Vietnam	25–16	25–16	25–15			75–47	2007 Asian; Championship	(Indonesia); Jakarta	
5-09-2007	20:30	Pakistan	0–3	India	20–25	27–29	20–25			67–79	2007 Asian; Championship	(Indonesia); Jakarta	
6-09-2007	20:30	India	3–0	Saudi Arabia	25–22	25–22	25–19			75–63	2007 Asian; Championship	(Indonesia); Jakarta	
7-09-2007	20:30	Qatar	2–3	India	25–22	25–21	21–25	18–25	10–15	99–108	2007 Asian; Championship	(Indonesia); Jakarta	
24-05-2009	15:00	India	3–2	Pakistan	25–18	24–26	20–25	25–20	15–13	109–102	2010 World Cup; Qualification	(Iran); Tehran	P2 P3
26-05-2009	15:00	India	3–1	Oman	25–18	20–25	25–23	25–19		95–85	2010 World Cup; Qualification	(Iran); Tehran	P2 P3
27-05-2009	17:00	Iran	3–1	India	21–25	25–19	25–21	25–19		96–84	2010 World Cup; Qualification	(Iran); Tehran	P2 P3
14-08-2009	15:30	Australia	3–0	India	25–15	25–22	25–19			75–56	2010 World Cup; Qualification	(China); Chengdu	P2 P3
15-08-2009	20:00	China	3–0	India	25–16	25–16	25–16			75–48	2010 World Cup; Qualification	(China); Chengdu	P2 P3
16-08-2009	20:00	India	3–0	Thailand	25–22	25–20	25–19			75–61	2010 World Cup; Qualification	(China); Chengdu	P2 P3
27-09-2009	10:00	India	1–3	Indonesia	25–25	22–25	23–25	16–25		86–88	2009 Asian; Championship	(Philippines); Manila	Report
28-09-2009	17:00	Japan	3–1	India	25–17	24–26	25–20	25–22		99–85	2009 Asian; Championship	(Philippines); Manila	Report
30-09-2009	18:00	India	3–0	Thailand	25–18	25–20	25–23			75–61	2009 Asian; Championship	(Philippines); Manila	Report
2-10-2009	14:00	India	3–0	Qatar	25–14	25–22	25–15			75–51	2009 Asian; Championship	(Philippines); Manila	Report
3-10-2009	14:00	India	3–0	Lebanon	25–16	25–19	25–13			75–48	2009 Asian; Championship	(Philippines); Manila	Report
4-10-2009	18:00	India	3–0	Vietnam	25–23	25–18	25–15			75–56	2009 Asian; Championship	(Philippines); Manila	Report
5-10-2009	16:00	Myanmar	0–3	India	21–25	16–19	16–25			53–75	2009 Asian; Championship	(Philippines); Manila	Report

=== 2010s ===
Date	Time		Score		Set 1	Set 2	Set 3	Set 4	Set 5	Total	Event	Location	Report
1-08-2010	18:00	Iran	3–2	India	25–15	25–17	23–25	23–25	15–10	111–92	2010 AVC; Asian Cup	(Iran); Urmia	Report
2-08-2010	13:30	China	3–1	India	25–22	25–19	21–25	25–20		96–86	2010 AVC; Asian Cup	(Iran); Urmia	Report
3-08-2010	13:30	India	3–1	Chinese Taipei	22–25	33–31	25–18	25–20		105–94	2010 AVC; Asian Cup	(Iran); Urmia	Report
5-08-2010	18:30	South Korea	2–3	India	23–25	25–12	25–20	19–25	11–15	103–97	2010 AVC; Asian Cup	(Iran); Urmia	Report
6-08-2010	16:30	Iran	3–2	India	25–19	22–25	20–25	25–17	15–11	107–97	2010 AVC; Asian Cup	(Iran); Urmia	Report
7-08-2010	18:30	India	3–1	Chinese Taipei	22–25	25–20	25–16	27–25		99–86	2010 AVC; Asian Cup	(Iran); Urmia	Report
14-11-2010	18:00	India	3–1	Kazakhstan	24–26	25–23	25–18	25–21		99–88	2010 Asian; Games	(China); Guangzhou	
15-11-2010	18:00	South Korea	3–0	India	25–19	25–20	25–19			75–58	2010 Asian; Games	(China); Guangzhou	
16-11-2010	18:00	India	3–0	Vietnam	25–20	25–16	25–23			75–59	2010 Asian; Games	(China); Guangzhou	Report
19-11-2010	16:00	Japan	2–3	India	20–25	19–25	25–21	28-26	13–15	105–112	2010 Asian; Games	(China); Guangzhou	Report
20-11-2010	18:00	India	3–0	Qatar	25–15	25–13	25–20			75–48	2010 Asian; Games	(China); Guangzhou	Report
21-11-2010	16:00	India	0–3	Thailand	20–25	23–23	22–25			65–75	2010 Asian; Games	(China); Guangzhou	Report
24-11-2010	16:00	Qatar	0–3	India	23–25	16–25	17–25			56–75	2010 Asian; Games	(China); Guangzhou	Report
26-11-2010	20:00	India	0–3	China	18–25	17–25	18–25			53–75	2010 Asian; Games	(China); Guangzhou	Report
21-09-2011	14:00	India	3–2	Chinese Taipei	25–20	20–25	27–25	20–25	15–12	107–107	2011 Asian; Championship	(Iran); Tehran	Report
22-09-2011	16:00	India	3–0	Afghanistan	25–9	25–13	25–11			75–33	2011 Asian; Championship	(Iran); Tehran	Report
23-09-2011	18:30	Iran	3–0	India	27–25	25–17	27–25			79–67	2011 Asian; Championship	(Iran); Tehran	Report
25-09-2011	14:00	Japan	1–3	India	25–20	28–30	21–25	23–25		97–100	2011 Asian; Championship	(Iran); Tehran	Report
26-09-2011	10:00	India	3–2	Pakistan	25–23	25–23	19–25	18–25	15–13	102–109	2011 Asian; Championship	(Iran); Tehran	Report
26-09-2011	10:00	India	0–3	China	25–27	20–25	20–25			65–77	2011 Asian; Championship	(Iran); Tehran	Report
26-09-2011	11:00	Japan	3–2	India	23–25	18–25	25–17	25–22	21–19	112–108	2011 Asian; Championship	(Iran); Tehran	Report
8-06-2012	20:10	India	0–3	Germany	16–25	19–25	15–25			50–75	2012 Olympics; Qualification	(Germany); Berlin	P2 P3
9-06-2012	15:10	India	0–3	Czechia	19–25	13–25	23–25			55–75	2012 Olympics; Qualification	(Germany); Berlin	P2 P3
10-06-2012	14:30	Cuba	3–0	India	25–12	25–22	25–20			75–54	2012 Olympics; Qualification	(Germany); Berlin	P2 P3
1-09-2012	16:00	India	3–0	Australia	25–18	25–22	25–23			75–63	2012 AVC; Asian Cup	(Vietnam); Vĩnh Phúc	Report
2-09-2012	14:00	Iran	3–1	India	26–24	27–29	27–25	25–22		105–100	2012 AVC; Asian Cup	(Vietnam); Vĩnh Phúc	Report
3-09-2012	14:00	India	1–3	China	17–25	25–23	17–25	17–25		76–98	2012 AVC; Asian Cup	(Vietnam); Vĩnh Phúc	Report
5-09-2012	14:00	South Korea	2–3	India	25–27	25–14	20–25	25–23	15–17	76–98	2012 AVC; Asian Cup	(Vietnam); Vĩnh Phúc	
6-09-2012	20:00	Iran	3–0	India	25–23	25–13	25–23			75–59	2012 AVC; Asian Cup	(Vietnam); Vĩnh Phúc	Report
7-09-2012	20:00	India	1–3	Japan	25–16	18–25	20–25	21–25		84–91	2012 AVC; Asian Cup	(Vietnam); Vĩnh Phúc	
3-07-2013	17:45	India	3–0	Pakistan	25–21	25–20	25–21			75–62	2014 World Cup; Qualification	(Sri Lanka); Colombo	P2
4-07-2013	15:00	India	3–0	Maldives	25–17	25–14	25–12			75–43	2014 World Cup; Qualification	(Sri Lanka); Colombo	P2
5-07-2013	17:00	Sri Lanka	0–3	India	20–25	26–28	19–25			65–78	2014 World Cup; Qualification	(Sri Lanka); Colombo	P2
20-09-2013	16:00	India	3–0	Saudi Arabia	25–20	25–21	25–19			75–60	2014 World Cup; Qualification	(China); Chenzhou	P2
21-09-2013	16:00	India	3–1	Chinese Taipei	25–19	21–25	25–18	26–24		97–86	2014 World Cup; Qualification	(China); Chenzhou	P2
22-09-2013	19:30	China	3–0	India	25–17	25–18	25–17			75–52	2014 World Cup; Qualification	(China); Chenzhou	P2
29-09-2013	12:00	Qatar	3–2	India	17–25	25–21	23–25	25–23	15–13	105–107	2013 Asian; Championship	(United Arab Emirates); Dubai	Report
1-10-2013	14:00	Australia	2–3	India	23–25	24–26	25–23	25–23	12–15	109–112	2013 Asian; Championship	(United Arab Emirates); Dubai	Report
2-10-2013	12:00	Bahrain	1–3	India	20–25	23–25	26–24	26–28		95–102	2013 Asian; Championship	(United Arab Emirates); Dubai	Report
4-10-2013	16:00	China	3–1	India	22–25	25–22	25–21	25–18		97–86	2013 Asian; Championship	(United Arab Emirates); Dubai	Report
5-10-2013	14:00	Australia	3–1	India	25–20	25–18	21–25	25–12		96–75	2013 Asian; Championship	(United Arab Emirates); Dubai	Report
6-10-2013	12:00	Lebanon	2–3	India	25–27	25–23	23–25	25–21	15-17	113–113	2013 Asian; Championship	(United Arab Emirates); Dubai	Report
18-08-2014	19:00	Kazakhstan	0–3	India	23–25	17–25	19–25			59–75	2014 AVC; Asian Cup	(Kazakhstan); Almaty	Report
19-08-2014	14:00	Japan	0–3	India	11–25	25–27	23–25			59–77	2014 AVC; Asian Cup	(Kazakhstan); Almaty	Report
20-08-2014	16:00	India	1–3	South Korea	25–22	22–25	21–25	22–25		90–97	2014 AVC; Asian Cup	(Kazakhstan); Almaty	Report
22-08-2014	16:00	India	3–0	Thailand	25–19	25–23	26–24			76–66	2014 AVC; Asian Cup	(Kazakhstan); Almaty	Report
23-08-2014	16:00	Iran	1–3	India	25–20	27–29	29–31	25–27		106–107	2014 AVC; Asian Cup	(Kazakhstan); Almaty	Report
24-08-2014	18:00	India	0–3	South Korea	23–25	21–25	25–27			69–77	2014 AVC; Asian Cup	(Kazakhstan); Almaty	Report
20-09-2014	16:30	India	3–1	Hong Kong	23–25	25–18	25–16	25–21		98–90	2014 Asian; Games	(South Korea); Ansan and Incheon	Report
24-09-2014	15:00	India	3–0	Maldives	25–10	25–19	25–17			75–46	2014 Asian; Games	(South Korea); Ansan and Incheon	Report
26-09-2014	15:00	Iran	3–0	India	25–22	25–22	25–18			75–62	2014 Asian; Games	(South Korea); Ansan and Incheon	Report
28-09-2014	14:30	South Korea	3–0	India	25–22	27–25	25–18			77–65	2014 Asian; Games	(South Korea); Ansan and Incheon	Report
28-09-2014	19:30	Qatar	3–0	India	25–20	25–20	25–20			75–60	2014 Asian; Games	(South Korea); Ansan and Incheon	Report
1-10-2014	12:00	India	2–3	Japan	25–20	19–25	25–23	20–26	13–15	102–108	2014 Asian; Games	(South Korea); Ansan and Incheon	Report
2-10-2014	11:30	India	3–1	Thailand	22–25	25–18	25–23	25–20		97–86	2014 Asian; Games	(South Korea); Ansan and Incheon	Report
3-10-2014	14:30	India	3–2	Qatar	25–21	20–25	25–22	20–25	15–10	105–103	2014 Asian; Games	(South Korea); Ansan and Incheon	Report
31-07-2015	15:00	India	3–0	Turkmenistan	27–25	25–21	25–21			77–67	2015 Asian; Championship	(Iran); Tehran	Report
1-08-2015	17:00	India	0–3	Qatar	18–25	19–25	22–25			59–75	2015 Asian; Championship	(Iran); Tehran	Report
2-08-2015	15:00	Australia	3–0	India	25–19	25–19	25–16			75–54	2015 Asian; Championship	(Iran); Tehran	Report
3-08-2015	17:00	India	3–0	Sri Lanka	25–17	25–22	25–20			75–59	2015 Asian; Championship	(Iran); Tehran	Report
4-08-2015	17:00	India	2–3	Bahrain	16–25	25–15	25–14	22–25	14–16	102–95	2015 Asian; Championship	(Iran); Tehran	Report
6-08-2015	17:00	Kazakhstan	3–1	India	25–15	26–24	30–32	25–21		106–92	2015 Asian; Championship	(Iran); Tehran	Report
7-08-2015	17:00	India	3–2	Bahrain	18–25	25–23	25–13	18–25	15–13	101–99	2015 Asian; Championship	(Iran); Tehran	Report
20-08-2018	16:30	India	3–0	Hong Kong	27–25	25–22	25–19			77–66	2018 Asian; Games	(Indonesia); Jakarta	Report
22-08-2018	19:00	India	0–3	Qatar	15–25	20–25	20–25			55–75	2018 Asian; Games	(Indonesia); Jakarta	Report
25-08-2018	10:00	Maldives	0–3	India	12–25	21–25	17–25			50–75	2018 Asian; Games	(Indonesia); Jakarta	Report
26-08-2018	12:30	Japan	3–1	India	25–23	25–22	23–25	25–20		98–90	2018 Asian; Games	(Indonesia); Jakarta	Report
28-08-2018	12:30	India	1–3	Pakistan	25–21	21–25	21–25	23–25		90–96	2018 Asian; Games	(Indonesia); Jakarta	Report
30-08-2018	12:30	Myanmar	3–2	India	25–21	18–25	27–25	15–25	15–13	100–109	2018 Asian; Games	(Indonesia); Jakarta	Report
13-09-2019	16:00	Kazakhstan	2–3	India	29–31	14–25	30–28	25–18	9–15	107–117	2019 Asian; Championship	(Iran); Tehran	P2
14-09-2019	13:30	India	0–3	China	16–25	15–25	21–25			52–75	2019 Asian; Championship	(Iran); Tehran	P2
15-09-2019	13:30	India	3–1	Oman	22–25	25–12	25–21	25–19		97–77	2019 Asian; Championship	(Iran); Tehran	P2
17-09-2019	16:00	Australia	3–0	India	29–27	26–24	25–21			80–72	2019 Asian; Championship	(Iran); Tehran	P2
18-09-2019	19:05	Iran	3–0	India	25–16	25–21	25–21			75–58	2019 Asian; Championship	(Iran); Tehran	P2
19-09-2019	13:30	South Korea	3–1	India	25–20	25–23	20–25	25–21		95–87	2019 Asian; Championship	(Iran); Tehran	P2
20-09-2019	10:00	India	1–3	Chinese Taipei	25–20	22–25	11–25	16–25		74–95	2019 Asian; Championship	(Iran); Tehran	P2
21-09-2019	10:00	India	2–3	Pakistan	23–25	21–25	25–20	25–19	6-15	100–104	2019 Asian; Championship	(Iran); Tehran	P2

=== 2020s ===
Date	Time		Score		Set 1	Set 2	Set 3	Set 4	Set 5	Total	Event	Location	Report
7-01-2020	20:10	Qatar	3–0	India	25–22	25–20	25–23			75–65	2020 Olympics; Qualification	(China); Jiangmen	P2
8-01-2020	13:30	South Korea	3–0	India	25–19	25–20	25–23			75–62	2020 Olympics; Qualification	(China); Jiangmen	P2
9-01-2020	13:30	India	1–3	Australia	27–25	21–25	21–25	22-25		91–100	2020 Olympics; Qualification	(China); Jiangmen	P2
12-09-2021	09:30	Bahrain	3–0	India	27–25	25–21	25–21			77–67	2021 Asian; Championship	(Japan); Chiba and Funabashi	P2
13-09-2021	12:00	India	0–3	Qatar	22–25	14–25	20–25			56–75	2021 Asian; Championship	(Japan); Chiba and Funabashi	P2
14-09-2021	18:00	Japan	3–0	India	25–15	25–15	25–18			75–48	2021 Asian; Championship	(Japan); Chiba and Funabashi	P2
16-09-2021	12:30	India	3–0	Kuwait	25–20	25–20	25–20			75–60	2021 Asian; Championship	(Japan); Chiba and Funabashi	P2
17-09-2021	10:00	India	3–0	Uzbekistan	25–19	25–13	25–22			75–54	2021 Asian; Championship	(Japan); Chiba and Funabashi	P2
18-09-2021	18:30	India	3–0	Saudi Arabia	25–22	25–22	25–23			75–67	2021 Asian; Championship	(Japan); Chiba and Funabashi	P2
19-09-2021	17:30	Bahrain	2–3	India	16–22	23–25	25–20	25–23	14–16	103–109	2021 Asian; Championship	(Japan); Chiba and Funabashi	P2
7-08-2022	12:00	India	0–3	Japan	15–25	15–25	15–25			45–75	2022 AVC; Asian Cup	(Thailand); Nakhon Pathom	Report
7-08-2022	09:00	Australia	3–0	India	25–17	25–20	25–12			45–75	2022 AVC; Asian Cup	(Thailand); Nakhon Pathom	Report
11-08-2022	10:00	Hong Kong	1–3	India	23–25	21–25	31–29	25–27		100–106	2022 AVC; Asian Cup	(Thailand); Nakhon Pathom	Report
13-08-2022	10:00	India	0–3	Chinese Taipei	22–25	18–25	14–25			54–75	2022 AVC; Asian Cup	(Thailand); Nakhon Pathom	Report
19-09-2023	19:00	India	3–0	Cambodia	25–14	25–13	25–19			75–46	2022 Asian; Games	(China); Hangzhou	Report
20-09-2023	19:00	South Korea	2–3	India	27–25	27–29	22–25	25–20	15–17	116–116	2022 Asian; Games	(China); Hangzhou	Report
22-09-2023	14:30	India	3–0	Chinese Taipei	25–22	25–22	25–21			75–65	2022 Asian; Games	(China); Hangzhou	Report
22-09-2023	14:30	India	0–3	Japan	16–25	18–25	17–25			51–75	2022 Asian; Games	(China); Hangzhou	Report
26-09-2023	18:30	India	0–3	Pakistan	21–25	20–25	23–25			64–75	2022 Asian; Games	(China); Hangzhou	Report
19-08-2023	16:15	Qatar	3–0	India	25–20	25–19	25–19			75–58	2023 Asian; Championship	(Iran); Urmia	P2 Report
21-08-2023	16:15	India	3–1	Afghanistan	25–15	25–23	25–25	25–19		98–82	2023 Asian; Championship	(Iran); Urmia	P2 Report
23-08-2023	16:15	China	3–2	India	31–29	19–25	25–18	22–25	15–13	112–110	2023 Asian; Championship	(Iran); Urmia	P2 Report
24-08-2023	10:15	India	0–3	Indonesia	29–31	18–25	12–25			59–81	2023 Asian; Championship	(Iran); Urmia	P2 Report
25-08-2023	16:15	India	3–0	Iraq	25–17	25–23	25–16			75–56	2023 Asian; Championship	(Iran); Urmia	P2 Report
29-05-2025	10:30	Iran	3–1	India	20–25	25–19	25–19	25–22		95–85	2025; Cava Nation's; League	(Uzbekistan); Fergana	
30-05-2025	17:00	Uzbekistan	0–3	India	18–25	16–25	20–25			75–54	2025; Cava Nation's; League	(Uzbekistan); Fergana	
31-05-2025	13:00	Turkmenistan	1–3	India	27–29	25–21	19–25	18–25		100–89	2025; Cava Nation's; League	(Uzbekistan); Fergana	
2-06-2025	17:00	India	3–0	Pakistan	25–15	25–19	25–23			75–57	2025; Cava Nation's; League	(Uzbekistan); Fergana	
3-06-2025	15:30	India	3–2	Kazakhstan	26–24	19–25	23–25	25–21	15–13	108–108	2025; Cava Nation's; League	(Uzbekistan); Fergana	
4-06-2025	17:00	Iran	3–0	India	25–17	25–20	25–19			75–56	2025; Cava Nation's; League	(Uzbekistan); Fergana	
20-06-2026	21:00	India	3–0	New Zealand	25–23	25–19	25–14			75–56	2026 AVC; Cup	(India); Ahmedabad	P2 Boxscore
21-06-2026	21:00	India	3–0	Kazakhstan	25–16	25–21	25–15			75–52	2026 AVC; Cup	(India); Ahmedabad	P2 Boxscore
22-06-2026	21:00	India	3–1	Chinese Taipei	22–25	25–14	25–22	25–22		97–73	2026 AVC; Cup	(India); Ahmedabad	P2 Boxscore
23-06-2026	21:00	India	3–0	Bahrain	22–21	25–16	25–22			75–59	2026 AVC; Cup	(India); Ahmedabad	P2 Boxscore
25-06-2026	21:00	India	3–0	Australia	26–24	25–14	30–28			81–66	2026 AVC; Cup	(India); Ahmedabad	P2 Boxscore
27-06-2026	19:00	India	2–3	Indonesia	24–15	24–26	20–25	25–19	13–15	107–100	2026 AVC; Cup	(India); Ahmedabad	P2 Boxscore
28-06-2026	15:30	Bahrain	1–3	India	23–25	25–23	21–25	17–25		86–98	2026 AVC; Cup	(India); Ahmedabad	P2 Boxscore
05-09-2026	10:00	China	3–0	India	25–21	28–26	27–25			80–72	2026 Asian; Championship	(Japan); Kitakyushu	P2 Boxscore
06-09-2026	06:30	Iran	3–0	India	25–20	28–26	25–18			78–64	2026 Asian; Championship	(Japan); Kitakyushu	P2 Boxscore
08-09-2026	06:30	India	3–0	New Zealand	25–22	25–22	25–21			75–65	2026 Asian; Championship	(Japan); Kitakyushu	P2 Boxscore
11-09-2026	16:00	Japan	3–0	India	25–17	25–15	25–19			75–51	2026 Asian; Championship	(Japan); Kitakyushu	P2 Boxscore
27-09-2026	12:30	India	3–0	Vietnam	25–23	25–21	25–20			75–64	2026 Asian Games	(Japan); Aichi-Nagoya	P2 Report
28-09-2026	06:30	India	3–0	Hong Kong	25–22	25–19	25–21			75–62	2026 Asian Games	(Japan); Aichi-Nagoya	P2 Report
29-09-2026	12:30	Qatar	2–3	India	28–26	27–25	23–25	20–25	22–24	120–125	2026 Asian Games	(Japan); Aichi-Nagoya	P2 Report
01-10-2026	06:30	India	0–3	Pakistan	19–25	23–25	18–25			60–75	2026 Asian Games	(Japan); Aichi-Nagoya	P2 Report
02-10-2026	06:30	India	3–1	South Korea	25–16	25–20	23–25	25–23		98–84	2026 Asian Games	(Japan); Aichi-Nagoya	P2 Report
03-10-2026	09:30	Thailand	3–2	India	25–19	17–25	25–21	17–25	17–15	101–105	2026 Asian Games	(Japan); Aichi-Nagoya	P2 Report

== Overall competitive records ==
As of 3 October 2026 vs Thailand (excludes unrecorded tournaments).

Competition	Pld	W	L	SPW	SPL	SPD	SPR	Win%
World Cup	11	6	5	427	340	+87	1.256	54.5%
World Cup qualification	20	12	8	1,608	1,580	+28	1.018	60%
Summer Olympics qualification	6	0	6	377	475	–98	0.794	0%
Asian Games (Note: excludes unrecorded set points in 1966 and 1978 Asian Games.)	92	55	37	5,091	4,699	+392	1.083	59.8%
Asian Championship (Note: excludes unrecorded set points in 1979, 1983, 1987, 1989, 1991 and 1997 Asian Championships.)	125	74	51	8,333	7,789	+544	1.070	59.2%
AVC Asian Cup†	22	10	12	1,832	1,920	–88	0.954	45.5%
AVC Cup	7	6	1	608	502	+106	1.211	85.7%
CAVA Nations League	6	4	2	499	478	+21	1.044	66.7%
Total	289	167	122	18,775	17,783	+992	1.056	57.8%

† Defunct tournament

== Head-to-head record ==
As of 3 October 2026 vs Thailand (excludes exhibition games, unrecorded and unofficial tournaments).

Positive Record Neutral Record Negative Record

Opponent	Pld	W	L	SPW	SPL	SPD	SPR	Win %
Afghanistan	2	2	0	173	115	+58	1.504	100%
Australia (Note: excludes unrecorded set points in 1983 Asian Championship.)	13	5	8	857	944	−87	0.908	38.5%
Bahrain (Note: excludes unrecorded set points in 1978 Asian Games.) (Note: excludes unrecorded set points in 1987 Asian Championship.) (Note: excludes unrecorded set points in 1997 Asian Championship.)	14	12	2	970	860	+110	1.128	85.7%
Bangladesh	1	1	0	45	4	+41	11.250	100%
Brazil	1	0	1	48	62	−14	0.774	0%
Cambodia	2	2	0	120	67	+53	1.791	100%
China	21	0	21	1165	1456	−291	0.800	0%
Chinese Taipei	15	11	4	1148	1124	+24	1.021	73.3%
Cuba	1	0	1	54	75	−21	0.720	0%
Czechia	2	0	2	76	120	−44	0.663	0%
Finland	1	1	0	45	9	+36	5.000	100%
France	1	0	1	19	45	−26	0.422	0%
Germany (Note: includes West Germany records.)	2	1	1	95	82	+13	1.159	50%
Hong Kong	7	7	0	491	368	+123	1.334	100%
Indonesia (Note: excludes unrecorded set points in 1966 Asian Games.)	11	6	5	647	601	+46	1.077	54.5%
Iran (Note: excludes unrecorded set points in 1979 Asian Championship) (Note: excludes unrecorded set points in 1989 Asian Championship)	20	4	16	1394	1554	−160	0.897	20%
Iraq	2	2	0	120	78	+42	1.538	100%
Israel	1	1	0	45	18	+27	2.500	100%
Japan	27	4	23	1568	1910	−342	0.821	14.8%
Kazakhstan (Note: excludes unrecorded set points in 1993 Asian Championship)	12	11	1	925	792	+133	1.168	91.7%
Kuwait	9	7	2	460	293	+167	1.157	77.8%
Lebanon	5	5	0	367	285	+82	1.288	100%
Luxembourg	1	1	0	45	5	+40	9.000	100%
Macau	1	1	0	75	50	+25	1.500	100%
Malaysia	1	1	0	45	14	+31	3.241	100%
Maldives	3	3	0	225	139	+86	1.619	100%
Myanmar (Note: earlier played as Burma.)	4	3	1	274	197	+77	1.391	75%
New Zealand	4	4	0	240	170	+70	1.412	100%
Oman	2	2	0	192	162	+30	1.185	100%
Pakistan	17	12	5	1209	1105	+104	1.094	70.6%
Philippines	4	4	0	156	66	+90	2.364	100%
Poland	1	0	1	33	46	−13	0.717	0%
Qatar	18	11	7	1482	1366	+116	1.085	61.1%
Saudi Arabia (Note: excludes unrecorded set points in 1991 Asian Championship.)	11	10	1	638	499	+139	1.279	90.9%
South Korea	22	6	16	1404	1592	−188	0.882	27.3%
Sri Lanka	4	4	0	273	186	+87	1.468	100%
Thailand	14	11	3	905	771	+134	1.174	78.6%
Turkey	1	1	0	45	18	+27	2.500	100%
Turkmenistan	2	2	0	177	156	+21	1.135	100%
United Arab Emirates	3	3	0	75	45	+30	1.667	100%
Uzbekistan	2	2	0	150	108	+42	1.389	100%
Vietnam	4	4	0	300	226	+74	1.327	100%
Total	289	167	122	18,775	17,783	+988	1.056	57.8%
