= 2012 Asian Junior Men's Volleyball Championship =

2012 Asian Junior Men's Championship

Tournament details
- Host country: Iran
- Dates: 27 September – 5 October 2012
- Teams: 13
- Venues: 2 (in 1 host city)

Final positions
- Champions: Japan (3rd title)

Tournament awards
- MVP: (Japan) Masahiro Sekita

The 2012 Asian Junior Men's Volleyball Championship was held in Urmia, Iran.

== Pools composition ==
The teams are seeded based on their final ranking at the 2010 Asian Junior Men's Volleyball Championship.

Pool A	Pool B	Pool C	Pool D
Iran (Host & 2nd); ~~Qatar (8th)~~ * Turkmenistan; Australia	Japan (1st); Thailand (7th); Afghanistan; Sri Lanka	India (3rd); Chinese Taipei (6th); Uzbekistan; ~~Kuwait~~ *	China (4th); South Korea (5th); Kazakhstan; ~~Pakistan~~ *

* Withdrew

== Preliminary round ==
=== Pool A ===
Pos	Team	Pld	W	L	Pts	SW	SL	SR	SPW	SPL	SPR	Qualification
1	Iran	2	2	0	6	6	1	6.000	170	123	1.382	Pool E
2	Australia	2	1	1	2	4	5	0.800	189	194	0.974	Pool E
3	Turkmenistan	2	0	2	1	2	6	0.333	142	184	0.772	Pool G

Date	Time		Score		Set 1	Set 2	Set 3	Set 4	Set 5	Total	Report
27 Sep	10:00	Turkmenistan	2–3	Australia	20–25	19–25	25–21	25–23	10–15	99–109	Report
28 Sep	18:00	Australia	1–3	Iran	20–25	12–25	25–20	23–25		80–95	Report
29 Sep	18:00	Iran	3–0	Turkmenistan	25–13	25–17	25–13			75–43	Report

=== Pool B ===
Pos	Team	Pld	W	L	Pts	SW	SL	SR	SPW	SPL	SPR	Qualification
1	Japan	3	3	0	9	9	0	MAX	225	143	1.573	Pool F
2	Thailand	3	2	1	6	6	3	2.000	208	171	1.216	Pool F
3	Sri Lanka	3	1	2	3	3	6	0.500	172	199	0.864	Pool H
4	Afghanistan	3	0	3	0	0	9	0.000	133	225	0.591	Pool H

Date	Time		Score		Set 1	Set 2	Set 3	Set 4	Set 5	Total	Report
27 Sep	14:00	Afghanistan	0–3	Thailand	16–25	16–25	19–25			51–75	Report
27 Sep	16:00	Sri Lanka	0–3	Japan	22–25	17–25	13–25			52–75	Report
28 Sep	10:00	Thailand	0–3	Japan	22–25	18–25	18–25			58–75	Report
28 Sep	14:00	Afghanistan	0–3	Sri Lanka	13–25	19–25	17–25			49–75	Report
29 Sep	14:00	Japan	3–0	Afghanistan	25–10	25–10	25–13			75–33	Report
29 Sep	18:00	Sri Lanka	0–3	Thailand	17–25	15–25	13–25			45–75	Report

=== Pool C ===
Pos	Team	Pld	W	L	Pts	SW	SL	SR	SPW	SPL	SPR	Qualification
1	India	2	2	0	5	6	3	2.000	204	175	1.166	Pool E
2	Chinese Taipei	2	1	1	4	5	3	1.667	180	163	1.104	Pool E
3	Uzbekistan	2	0	2	0	1	6	0.167	126	172	0.733	Pool G

Date	Time		Score		Set 1	Set 2	Set 3	Set 4	Set 5	Total	Report
27 Sep	18:00	India	3–1	Uzbekistan	25–15	25–13	22–25	25–17		97–70	Report
28 Sep	18:00	India	3–2	Chinese Taipei	25–22	18–25	25–18	22–25	17–15	107–105	Report
29 Sep	16:00	Chinese Taipei	3–0	Uzbekistan	25–15	25–19	25–22			75–56	Report

=== Pool D ===
Pos	Team	Pld	W	L	Pts	SW	SL	SR	SPW	SPL	SPR	Qualification
1	China	2	2	0	5	6	2	3.000	183	158	1.158	Pool F
2	South Korea	2	1	1	4	5	4	1.250	194	180	1.078	Pool F
3	Kazakhstan	2	0	2	0	1	6	0.167	129	168	0.768	Pool H

Date	Time		Score		Set 1	Set 2	Set 3	Set 4	Set 5	Total	Report
27 Sep	16:00	South Korea	3–1	Kazakhstan	25–14	18–25	25–16	25–17		93–72	Report
28 Sep	16:00	China	3–0	Kazakhstan	25–15	25–21	25–21			75–57	Report
29 Sep	16:00	South Korea	2–3	China	21–25	25–23	25–20	23–25	7–15	101–108	Report

== Classification round ==
- The results and the points of the matches between the same teams that were already played during the preliminary round shall be taken into account for the classification round.

=== Pool E ===
Pos	Team	Pld	W	L	Pts	SW	SL	SR	SPW	SPL	SPR	Qualification
1	Iran	3	3	0	9	9	2	4.500	268	223	1.202	Quarterfinals
2	India	3	2	1	4	6	7	0.857	276	286	0.965	Quarterfinals
3	Chinese Taipei	3	1	2	4	6	7	0.857	282	291	0.969	Quarterfinals
4	Australia	3	0	3	1	4	9	0.444	272	298	0.913	Quarterfinals

Date	Time		Score		Set 1	Set 2	Set 3	Set 4	Set 5	Total	Report
30 Sep	14:00	India	3–2	Australia	20–25	23–25	25–21	25–21	15–11	108–103	Report
30 Sep	16:00	Iran	3–1	Chinese Taipei	25–21	25–22	20–25	25–14		95–82	Report
01 Oct	10:00	Australia	1–3	Chinese Taipei	25–20	23–25	20–25	21–25		89–95	Report
01 Oct	16:00	Iran	3–0	India	28–26	25–13	25–22			78–61	Report

=== Pool F ===
Pos	Team	Pld	W	L	Pts	SW	SL	SR	SPW	SPL	SPR	Qualification
1	Japan	3	3	0	9	9	0	MAX	225	180	1.250	Quarterfinals
2	China	3	2	1	5	6	5	1.200	243	231	1.052	Quarterfinals
3	South Korea	3	1	2	4	5	6	0.833	238	238	1.000	Quarterfinals
4	Thailand	3	0	3	0	0	9	0.000	168	225	0.747	Quarterfinals

Date	Time		Score		Set 1	Set 2	Set 3	Set 4	Set 5	Total	Report
30 Sep	10:00	Japan	3–0	South Korea	25–22	25–18	25–22			75–62	Report
30 Sep	18:00	China	3–0	Thailand	25–13	25–23	25–19			75–55	Report
01 Oct	14:00	Thailand	0–3	South Korea	20–25	19–25	16–25			55–75	Report
01 Oct	18:00	Japan	3–0	China	25–22	25–16	25–22			75–60	Report

=== Pool G ===
Pos	Team	Pld	W	L	Pts	SW	SL	SR	SPW	SPL	SPR	Qualification
1	Turkmenistan	1	1	0	3	3	1	3.000	101	95	1.063	9th–12th place
2	Uzbekistan	1	0	1	0	1	3	0.333	95	101	0.941	9th–12th place

Date	Time		Score		Set 1	Set 2	Set 3	Set 4	Set 5	Total	Report
01 Oct	14:00	Turkmenistan	3–1	Uzbekistan	23–25	28–26	25–21	25–23		101–95	Report

=== Pool H ===
Pos	Team	Pld	W	L	Pts	SW	SL	SR	SPW	SPL	SPR	Qualification
1	Sri Lanka	2	2	0	6	6	1	6.000	171	131	1.305	9th–12th place
2	Kazakhstan	2	1	1	3	4	3	1.333	157	132	1.189	9th–12th place
3	Afghanistan	2	0	2	0	0	6	0.000	85	150	0.567	

Date	Time		Score		Set 1	Set 2	Set 3	Set 4	Set 5	Total	Report
30 Sep	10:00	Kazakhstan	3–0	Afghanistan	25–8	25–11	25–17			75–36	Report
01 Oct	16:00	Sri Lanka	3–1	Kazakhstan	25–20	25–14	21–25	25–23		96–82	Report

== Classification 9th–12th ==
9th–12th places
3 October – Urmia
Turkmenistan	0
Kazakhstan	3
3 October – Urmia
Sri Lanka	3
Uzbekistan	2

9th place
4 October – Urmia
Kazakhstan	3
Sri Lanka	1
11th place
4 October – Urmia
Turkmenistan	3
Uzbekistan	1

=== Semifinals ===
Date	Time		Score		Set 1	Set 2	Set 3	Set 4	Set 5	Total	Report
03 Oct	16:00	Turkmenistan	0–3	Kazakhstan	17–25	22–25	19–25			58–75	
03 Oct	18:00	Sri Lanka	3–2	Uzbekistan	24–26	25–15	22–25	25–14	15–13	111–93	

=== 11th place ===
Date	Time		Score		Set 1	Set 2	Set 3	Set 4	Set 5	Total	Report
04 Oct	10:00	Turkmenistan	3–1	Uzbekistan	26–24	27–25	22–25	25–20		100–94	Report

=== 9th place ===
Date	Time		Score		Set 1	Set 2	Set 3	Set 4	Set 5	Total	Report
04 Oct	14:00	Kazakhstan	3–1	Sri Lanka	27–25	23–25	25–18	27–25		102–93	Report

== Final round ==
Quarterfinals
3 October – Urmia
Iran	3
Thailand	1
3 October – Urmia
China	3
Chinese Taipei	1
3 October – Urmia
Japan	3
Australia	0
3 October – Urmia
India	3
South Korea	1

Semifinals
4 October – Urmia
Iran	2
China	3
4 October – Urmia
Japan	3
India	2

Final
5 October – Urmia
China	0
Japan	3
3rd place
5 October – Urmia
Iran	3
India	0

5th–8th places
4 October – Urmia
Thailand	1
Chinese Taipei	3
4 October – Urmia
Australia	0
South Korea	3

5th place
5 October – Urmia
Chinese Taipei	0
South Korea	3
7th place
5 October – Urmia
Thailand	2
Australia	3

=== Quarterfinals ===
Date	Time		Score		Set 1	Set 2	Set 3	Set 4	Set 5	Total	Report
03 Oct	10:00	India	3–1	South Korea	19–25	25–13	25–22	30–28		99–88	
03 Oct	14:00	Japan	3–0	Australia	25–20	25–17	25–20			75–57	
03 Oct	16:00	Iran	3–1	Thailand	22–25	25–14	25–14	25–12		97–65	
03 Oct	18:00	China	3–1	Chinese Taipei	25–23	25–22	22–25	28–26		100–96	

=== 5th–8th semifinals ===
Date	Time		Score		Set 1	Set 2	Set 3	Set 4	Set 5	Total	Report
04 Oct	10:00	Thailand	1–3	Chinese Taipei	19–25	27–25	17–25	23–25		86–100	Report
04 Oct	14:00	Australia	0–3	South Korea	18–25	21–25	20–25			59–75	Report

=== Semifinals ===
Date	Time		Score		Set 1	Set 2	Set 3	Set 4	Set 5	Total	Report
04 Oct	16:00	Iran	2–3	China	25–21	23–25	19–25	25–15	17–19	109–105	Report
04 Oct	18:00	Japan	3–2	India	29–31	19–25	25–14	25–17	15–9	113–96	Report

=== 7th place ===
Date	Time		Score		Set 1	Set 2	Set 3	Set 4	Set 5	Total	Report
05 Oct	10:00	Thailand	2–3	Australia	25–19	16–25	21–25	27–25	10–15	99–109	

=== 5th place ===
Date	Time		Score		Set 1	Set 2	Set 3	Set 4	Set 5	Total	Report
05 Oct	10:00	Chinese Taipei	0–3	South Korea	12–25	15–25	19–25			46–75	

=== 3rd place ===
Date	Time		Score		Set 1	Set 2	Set 3	Set 4	Set 5	Total	Report
05 Oct	14:00	Iran	3–0	India	25–21	25–13	25–11			75–45	

=== Final ===
Date	Time		Score		Set 1	Set 2	Set 3	Set 4	Set 5	Total	Report
05 Oct	16:00	China	0–3	Japan	23–25	22–25	23–25			68–75	

== Final standing ==
Rank	Team
1st place, gold medalist(s)	Japan
2nd place, silver medalist(s)	China
3rd place, bronze medalist(s)	Iran
4	India
5	South Korea
6	Chinese Taipei
7	Australia
8	Thailand
9	Kazakhstan
10	Sri Lanka
11	Turkmenistan
12	Uzbekistan
13	Afghanistan

Qualified for the 2013 World Junior Championship

2012 Asian Junior Men's champions

Japan
Third title

Team Roster

Masahiro Sekita (c), Koichi Tominaga, Naoya Takano, Takahiko Imamura, Hideyuki Kuriyama, Kenya Fujinaka, Takuya Takahashi, Raita Takino, Shun Watanabe, Hiroaki Sasaki, Yasunari Kodama, Jumpei Ikeda

Head Coach: Noriaki Sako

== Awards ==
- MVP: (Japan) Masahiro Sekita
- Best scorer: (Iran) Javad Hosseinabadi
- Best spiker: (China) Jin Zhihong
- Best blocker: (India) Dipesh Kumar Sinha
- Best server: (Iran) Alireza Nasr Esfahani
- Best setter: (China) Mao Tianyi
- Best libero: (Japan) Raita Takino
