= Kumara Wendakoon =

Kumara Wendakoon is a volleyball player, coach and the former head coach of the Maldives Men's National Volleyball team and Sri Lanka men's national volleyball team. He is currently the Secretary of Sri Lanka Schools' Volleyball Association and a Vice President of Sri Lanka Volleyball Federation. He played for National Junior and Senior Volleyball teams in 1980's.

As a coach, under his guidance Sri Lankan Volleyball men's team achieved the Silver medal in South Asian Games in 2006.

He holds a diploma in sports (specialized in volleyball), and is an FIVB level I, II and III qualified coach.
