= CAVA Men's Volleyball Championship =

International volleyball competition in Asia

- Most recent season or competition: 2026 CAVA Men's Volleyball Championship
- Formerly: Central Asian Men's Volleyball Championship (2022); CAVA Men's Volleyball Nations League (2023–2025)
- Sport: Volleyball
- Founded: 2022
- No. of teams: Various
- Continent: Central and South Asia (CAVA)
- Most recent champion: Pakistan (3rd title)
- Most titles: Pakistan (3 titles)
- Website: Asian Volleyball Confederation

The CAVA Men's Volleyball Championship, earlier known as CAVA Men's Volleyball Nations League, is an international volleyball competition in Central and South Asia contested by the senior men's national teams of the members of Central Asian Volleyball Association (CAVA), the sport's regional governing body.

== History ==
The tournament was initially named the AVC Asian Senior Men's Central Zone Volleyball Championship. In 2022, the tournament was held in Lahore, Pakistan from 24 to 29 November. The host nation claimed their first title. In 2023 CAVA rebranded the tournament's name into the CAVA Nations League. The next edition was held in Kyrgyzstan. Iran won the first title. In 2024, the tournament was held in Pakistan. The host nation claimed their second title. In 2025 the tournament, originally scheduled in Pakistan, was moved to Uzbekistan. Uzbekistan and Iran claimed their second title in tournament.

== Precursors ==
Before 2020, the Asian regional federations were not very active. Their entire activity consisted of holding several irregular competitions and in practice there was no clear management structure. Regional competitions were held under the title of zone competitions, and this region was Zone 2 of Asia and was mostly managed by the Asian Federation itself, not the Central Asian Federation. Zone 2 Men's Asia Volleyball Championship was held in 4 editions:

Year	Host	Final			Third place match			Teams
Year	Host	Champions	Score	Runners-up	3rd place	Score	4th place	Teams
2006; Details	(Sri Lanka); Colombo	Kazakhstan	Round-robin	Pakistan	India	Round-robin	Sri Lanka	5
2007; Details	(Pakistan); Islamabad	India	Round-robin	Iran	Kazakhstan	Round-robin	Pakistan	7
2010; Details	(Pakistan)							
2019; Details	(Nepal); Kathmandu	Kyrgyzstan	3–0	Uzbekistan	Turkmenistan	3–0	Maldives	7

== Results summary ==
Year	Host	Final			Third place match			Teams
Year	Host	Champions	Score	Runners-up	3rd place	Score	4th place	Teams
2022; Details	(Pakistan); Lahore	Pakistan	3–1	Iran	Bangladesh	3–2	Sri Lanka	5
2023; Details	(Kyrgyzstan); Cholpon-Ata	Iran	Round-robin	Kyrgyzstan	Mongolia	Round-robin	Uzbekistan	7
2024; Details	(Pakistan); Islamabad	Pakistan	3–1	Turkmenistan	Kyrgyzstan	3–1	Sri Lanka	6
2025; Details	(Uzbekistan); Fergana	Iran	3–0	India	Pakistan	3–1	Kazakhstan	7
2026; Details	(Pakistan); Islamabad	Pakistan	3–0	Bangladesh	Sri Lanka	3–2	Uzbekistan	6

=== Teams reaching the top four ===
Team	Winners	Runners-up	Third-place	Fourth-place
Pakistan	3 (2022, 2024, 2026)		1 (2025)	
Iran	2 (2023, 2025)	1 (2022)		
Kyrgyzstan		1 (2023)	1 (2024)	
Bangladesh		1 (2026)	1 (2022)	
India		1 (2025)		
Turkmenistan		1 (2024)		
Sri Lanka			1 (2026)	2 (2022, 2024)
Mongolia			1 (2023)	
Uzbekistan				2 (2023, 2026)
Kazakhstan				1 (2025)

=== Hosts ===
Number	Nations	Year(s)
3	Pakistan	2022, 2024, 2026
1	Kyrgyzstan	2023
1	Uzbekistan	2025

== Medal summary ==
Rank	Nation	Gold	Silver	Bronze	Total
1	Pakistan	3	0	1	4
2	Iran	2	1	0	3
3	Kyrgyzstan	0	1	1	2
4	India	0	1	0	1
4	Turkmenistan	0	1	0	1
6	Bangladesh	0	0	1	1
6	Mongolia	0	0	1	1
Totals (7 entries)		5	4	4	13

== Participating nations ==
Legend

- 1st – Champions
- 2nd – Runners-up
- 3rd – Third place
- 4th – Fourth place
- • – Did not enter / Did not qualify
- – Hosts
- Q – Qualified for forthcoming tournament

Team	(Pakistan); 2022 (5)	(Kyrgyzstan); 2023 (7)	(Pakistan); 2024 (6)	(Uzbekistan); 2025 (7)	(Pakistan); 2026 (6)	Total
Afghanistan	5th	•	6th	•	•	2
Bangladesh	3rd	•	•	•	2nd	2
India	•	•	•	2nd	•	1
Iran	2nd	1st	5th	1st	•	4
Kazakhstan	•	•	•	4th	5th	2
Kyrgyzstan	•	2nd	3rd	5th	•	3
Nepal	•	7th	•	•	6th	2
Pakistan	1st	•	1st	3rd	1st	4
Sri Lanka	4th	•	4th	•	3rd	3
Turkmenistan	•	5th	2nd	6th	•	3
Uzbekistan	•	4th	•	7th	4th	3
Invitee nations
Mongolia	•	3rd	•	•	•	1

== See also ==
- CAVA Women's Volleyball Nations League
- Asian Men's Volleyball Championship
- Asian Eastern Zonal Men's Volleyball Championship
- SEA V Cup
- WAVA Men's Volleyball Championship
- OZVA Men's Volleyball Championship
- Volleyball at the Asian Games
- Volleyball at the South Asian Games
- SAFF Championship
- SABA Championship
