= Volleyball at the Islamic Games =

The Men's and Women's Volleyball tournaments at the Islamic Games was held in İzmir Atatürk Volleyball Hall, İzmir, Turkey.

== Men's tournament ==
- 29 September 1980

Turkey	3 – 0	Saudi Arabia	15–4, 15–6, 15–5
Bangladesh	3 – 1	Libya	11–15, 15–13, 21–19, 15–11
Pakistan	3 – 0	Northern Cyprus

- 30 September 1980

Turkey	3 – 0	Bangladesh	15–2, 15–2, 15–2
Libya	3 – 0	Northern Cyprus
Saudi Arabia	3 – 0	Pakistan	16–14, 15–12, 15–5

- 1 October 1980

Turkey	3 – 0	Northern Cyprus	15–1, 15–3, 15–5
Saudi Arabia	3 – 0	Bangladesh	15–7, 15–4, 15–7
Pakistan	3 – 1	Libya	15–9, 7–15, 15–12, 15–7

- 2 October 1980

Turkey	3 – 0	Libya	15–2, 15–1, 15–1
Pakistan	3 – 0	Bangladesh	15–8, 15–7, 15–4
Saudi Arabia	3 – 0	Northern Cyprus	15–6, 15–3, 15–7

- 3 October 1980

Turkey	3 – 0	Pakistan	15–1, 15–6, 15–5
Saudi Arabia	3 – 0	Libya
Bangladesh	3 – 0	Northern Cyprus

=== Out of classification ===
The Palestine Liberation Organization men's volleyball team arrived in Izmir to participate in the Islamic Games, but the volleyball committee accepted Palestine's participation as out-of-class of the tournament.

- 2 October 1980

Turkey	4 – 0	Palestine	15–0, 15–4, 15–1, 15–5

=== Final ranking ===
RANK	TEAM
	Turkey
	Saudi Arabia
	Pakistan
4.	Bangladesh
5.	Libya
6.	Northern Cyprus

=== Awards ===
Men's Islamic Games champions

Turkey

== Women's tournament ==
Only two countries participated in this tournament.

- 30 September 1980

Turkey	3 – 0	Malaysia	15–0, 15–6, 15–4

=== Final ranking ===
RANK	TEAM
	Turkey
	Malaysia

=== Awards ===
Women's Islamic Games champions

Turkey
