= Masahiro Sekita =

Japanese volleyball player (born 1993)

Personal information
- Full name: Masahiro Sekita
- Nationality: Japanese
- Born: November 20, 1993 (age 32) Tokyo, Japan
- Education: Chuo University
- Height: 1.75 m (5 ft 9 in)
- Weight: 72 kg (159 lb)
- Spike: 324 cm (128 in)
- Block: 305 cm (120 in)

Volleyball information
- Position: Setter
- Current club: (Japan) Suntory Sunbirds
- Number: 8

National team
- Years: Team
- 2012–2013: Japan U–21 national team
- 2016–present: Japan senior national team
Medal record
Men's volleyball
Representing Japan
FIVB Nations League
Silver medal – second place	2024 Łódź	Team
Bronze medal – third place	2023 Gdańsk	Team
Asian U20 Championship
Gold medal – first place	2012 Urmia	Team
Asian Men's Volleyball Championship
Gold medal – first place	2023 Urmia	Team
Bronze medal – third place	2019 Tehran	Team

Masahiro Sekita (関田 誠大, Sekita Masahiro; born 20 November 1993) is a Japanese male professional volleyball player from Tokyo. He currently plays in SV.League for Suntory Sunbirds and Japan men's national volleyball team.

Sekita used to be the captain of Japan U-21 national team in 2012 Asian Junior Men's Volleyball Championship and 2013 FIVB Volleyball Men's U21 World Championship.

== Career ==
Sekita was the captain of Japan U-21 national team, from 2012 to 2013. Then, he had registered for Japan senior national team for the first time in 2016. In 2021, Sekita was one of the setters in the Japanese roster, which played in 2020 Tokyo Olympics. Japanese team advanced to the quarterfinals round in 29 years and at the end, he ranked the 7th place in the best setters category.

He transferred to Polish league, PlusLiga, playing for Cuprum Lubin in the 2021–22 season. Then he was back to play in the domestic league for JTEKT Stings.

In 2023, Sekita led the Japanese national team to win medals in 2 tournaments, Nations League and Asian Championship, which is bronze and gold respectively. Also, the team got a ticket for 2024 Summer Olympics after placed second in pool B in Olympic Qualification Tournaments which also known as World Cup.

Then in 2024, he and the team won first silver medal – the highest medal – ever in 2024 Nations League.

In May 2025, Sekita had his name in the Japanese men's national team but was not included in 2025 FIVB Men's Volleyball Nations League. JVA announced that he will undergo surgery on his right ankle.

== Clubs ==
- (Japan) Chuo University
- (Japan) Panasonic Panthers (2016–2018)
- (Japan) Osaka Blazers Sakai (2018–2021)
- (Poland) Cuprum Lubin (2021–2022)
- (Japan) JTEKT Stings (2022–2025)
- (Japan) Suntory Sunbirds (2025–present)

== Awards ==
=== Individual ===
- 2012 Asian Junior Men's Volleyball Championship – MVP award

=== Club ===
- 2022 Emperor's Cup — Champion, with JTEKT Stings

=== National teams ===
- 2012 Asian Junior Men's Volleyball Championship – Gold Medal
- 2019 Asian Men's Volleyball Championship – Bronze Medal
- 2023 FIVB Volleyball Men's Nations League – Bronze Medal
- 2023 Asian Men's Volleyball Championship – Gold Medal
- 2023 FIVB Nations League — Runner-up

== Personal life ==
After 2020 Summer Olympics, Sekita became a new brand ambassador for Mizuno, a Japanese sports equipment and sportswear company.

In January 2022, he announced his marriage through his social media account.
