= 2022 Central Asian Men's Volleyball Championship =

2022 Engro Central Asian Men's Volleyball Championship
Tournament details
- Host country: Pakistan
- City: Lahore
- Dates: 24–29 November 2022
- Teams: 5
- Venue: 1 (in 1 host city)

Final positions
- Champions: Pakistan (1st title)
- Runners-up: Iran
- Third place: Bangladesh
- Fourth place: Sri Lanka

Tournament awards
- MVP: (Pakistan) Fahad Raza

The 2022 Engro Central Asian Men's Volleyball Championship was the inaugural edition of the Central Asian Men's Volleyball Championship, an international tournament for member nations of the Central Asian Volleyball Association (CAVA). It was held in Pakistan from 24 to 29 November 2022.

Kyrgyzstan were the defending champions but did not compete that year. Pakistan won their first title, after beating Iran 3–1 in the final.

== Participating nations ==
The following national teams participated:

- Afghanistan
- Bangladesh
- Iran
- Pakistan
- Sri Lanka

== Venue ==
The tournament was hosted in Nishtar Park Sports Gymnasium, located in Lahore, Punjab Province.

All rounds
Lahore, Pakistan
Nishtar Park Sports Gymnasium
Capacity: n/a

== Preliminary round ==
- All times are Pakistan Standard Time (UTC+05:00).

Pos	Team	Pld	W	L	Pts	SW	SL	SR	SPW	SPL	SPR	Qualification
1	Pakistan	4	4	0	12	12	1	12.000	328	284	1.155	Final
2	Iran	4	3	1	9	9	3	3.000	288	234	1.231	Final
3	Sri Lanka	4	2	2	5	6	9	0.667	319	338	0.944	3rd place match
4	Bangladesh	4	1	3	4	5	10	0.500	337	349	0.966	3rd place match
5	Afghanistan	5	1	4	3	6	13	0.462	300	367	0.817	

Source: 2022 Central Asian Men's Volleyball Championship

Date	Time		Score		Set 1	Set 2	Set 3	Set 4	Set 5	Total	Report
24 Nov	16:00	Pakistan	3–0	Bangladesh	28–26	26–24	25–23			79–73	Report
24 Nov	18:00	Iran	3–0	Afghanistan	25–12	25–12	25–22			75–46	Report
25 Nov	16:00	Bangladesh	2–3	Sri Lanka	22–25	20–25	28–26	25–16	10–15	105–107	Report
25 Nov	18:00	Pakistan	3–1	Afghanistan	25–17	25–20	23–25	25–22		98–84	Report
26 Nov	16:00	Iran	3–0	Sri Lanka	25–15	25–8	29–27			79–50	Report
26 Nov	18:00	Bangladesh	3–1	Afghanistan	25–27	25–20	25–21	25–20		100–88	Report
27 Nov	16:00	Pakistan	3–0	Sri Lanka	25–21	26–24	25–23			76–68	Report
27 Nov	18:00	Iran	3–0	Bangladesh	25–22	25–17	25–20			75–59	Report
28 Nov	16:00	Pakistan	3–0	Iran	25–22	25–20	25–17			75–59	Report
28 Nov	18:00	Sri Lanka	3–1	Afghanistan	25–19	19–25	25–19	25–15		94–78	Report

== Final round ==
- All times are Pakistan Standard Time (UTC+05:00).

=== 3rd place match ===
Date	Time		Score		Set 1	Set 2	Set 3	Set 4	Set 5	Total	Report
29 Nov	16:00	Sri Lanka	2–3	Bangladesh	25–18	31–33	25–27	25–22	14–16	120–116	Report

=== Final ===
Date	Time		Score		Set 1	Set 2	Set 3	Set 4	Set 5	Total	Report
29 Nov	18:00	Pakistan	3–1	Iran	25–17	25–16	23–25	25–20		98–78	Report

== Final standing ==
Rank	Team
1st place, gold medalist(s)	Pakistan
2nd place, silver medalist(s)	Iran
3rd place, bronze medalist(s)	Bangladesh
4	Sri Lanka
5	Afghanistan

2022 Central Asian Men's Volleyball Championship

Pakistan
1st title

14–Men roster
Usman Faryad Ali, Haider Farooq, Mubashir Raza (c), Abdullah Abdullah, Ali Mazhar, Fahad Raza, Bilal Khan, Muhammad Kashif Naveed, Abdul Zaheer, Murad Jehan, Afaq Khan, Hamid Yazman, Nasir Ali, Ahmed Nazir
Head coach
Cristiano Rodrigues Campos

== Awards ==
- MVP: Fahad Raza (PAK)
- Best spiker: Usman Faryad Ali (PAK)
- Best middle blockers: Mahdi Jelveh Ghaziani (IRI)
- Best setter: Hamid Yazman (PAK)
- Best libero: Md Shaon Ali (BAN)
