= Javad Mohammadinejad =

Iranian volleyball player (born 1985)

Javad Mohammadinejad R.

Personal information
- Born: 22 March 1985 (age 41); Urmia, Iran

Volleyball information
- Position: Middle-blocker
- Current club: (Iran) Shardari Urmia
- Number: 6

Career
Teams
| | (Iran) Shardari Urmia (Iran) Paykan (Iran) Shahrdari Urmia |
Honours
Representing Iran
Men's volleyball
Asian Championship
| Gold medal – first place | 2011 Tehran |
AVC Cup
| Gold medal – first place | 2010 Urmia |

Javad Mohammadinejad R. (Persian: جواد محمدی‌نژاد, born 22 March 1985 in Urmia, West Azerbaijan) is a volleyball player from Iran, who plays as a Middle-blocker for Shahrdari Urmia VC in Iranian Volleyball Super League and Iran men's national volleyball team in the 2011 Asian Men's Volleyball Championship.
