= 2023 Asian Men's Volleyball Championship =

International volleyball tournament

والیبال قهرمانی مردان آسیا ۲۰۲۳
- Official logo

Tournament details
- Host country: Iran
- City: Urmia
- Dates: 19–26 August
- Teams: 17 (from 1 confederation)
- Venue: 2 (in 1 host city)

Final positions
- Champions: Japan (10th title)
- Runners-up: Iran
- Third place: Qatar
- Fourth place: China

Tournament awards
- MVP: (Japan) Yūki Ishikawa
- Best Setter: (Iran) Mohammad Taher Vadi
- Best OH: (Japan) Ran Takahashi; (Qatar) Raimi Wadidie
- Best MB: (Qatar) Belal Nabel Abunabot; (Japan) Taishi Onodera
- Best OPP: (Iran) Amin Esmaeilnejad
- Best Libero: (China) Yang Yiming

Tournament statistics
- Matches played: 41
- Attendance: 92,120 (2,247 per match)

The 2023 Asian Men's Volleyball Championship was the 22nd staging of the Asian Men's Volleyball Championship, a biennial international volleyball tournament organised by the Asian Volleyball Confederation (AVC) with Islamic Republic of Iran Volleyball Federation (IRIVF). The tournament was held in Urmia, Iran from 19 to 26 August 2023.

This was Iran's fifth time serving as the host nation.

Japan won their tenth title by defeating in straight sets the host and two-time defending champions Iran in the final. Iran took their third silver medal of the tournament. Qatar won their first medal of the tournament, claiming the bronze after defeating China (3–0) in the third place match. Yūki Ishikawa named as the MVP of the tournament.

Japan, Iran, and Qatar, the top three teams of the tournament qualified for the 2025 FIVB Volleyball Men's World Championship as the AVC representatives.

== Qualification ==
Following the AVC regulations, The maximum of 16 teams in all AVC events will be selected by:

- 1 team for the host country
- 10 teams based on the final standing of the previous edition
- 5 teams from each of 5 zones (with a qualification tournament if needed)

=== Qualified teams ===
The AVC stated that there were originally eighteen entrant teams that were due to participate in the tournament. However, on 17 August 2023, Mongolia announced that they withdrew from the tournament.

Event(s)		Dates	Location	Berths	Qualifier(s)
Host nation		20 December 2022	—N/a	1	Iran
2021 Asian Championship		12 – 19 September 2021	(Japan) Chiba and Funabashi	10 (Note: The host Iran was originally in top 10 of the previous edition. The spot was reallocated to Kazakhstan (11th placers). However, since Australia (6th placers) withdrew from the tournament and either did Saudi Arabia (12th placers), the spot was reallocated to Uzbekistan (13th placers).)	~~Iran~~; Japan; China; Chinese Taipei; Qatar; ~~Australia~~; Pakistan; South Korea; India; Bahrain; Kazakhstan; ~~Saudi Arabia~~; Uzbekistan
Direct zonal wildcards	Central Asia	2 February 2023	—N/a	2	~~Sri Lanka~~; Bangladesh; Afghanistan
Direct zonal wildcards	East Asia	2 February 2023	—N/a	1	Hong Kong; ~~Mongolia~~
Direct zonal wildcards	Southeast Asia	2 February 2023	—N/a	2	Thailand; Indonesia; ~~Philippines~~
Direct zonal wildcards	West Asia	2 February 2023	—N/a	1	Iraq; ~~Kuwait~~
Total				17	

== Pools composition ==
Teams were seeded in the first two positions of each pool following the serpentine system according to their final standing of the 2021 edition. AVC reserved the right to seed the hosts as head of Pool A regardless of the final standing of the 2021 edition. All teams not seeded were drawn in Bangkok, Thailand on 16 March 2023. Final standings of the 2021 edition are shown in brackets except the hosts who ranked 1st.

Pool A	Pool B	Pool C	Pool D	Pool E	Pool F
Iran (Hosts)	Japan (2)	China (3)	Chinese Taipei (4)	Qatar (5)	Pakistan (7)
Hong Kong (14)	Uzbekistan (13)	Kazakhstan (11)	Bahrain (10)	India (9)	South Korea (8)
Iraq (–)	Thailand (15)	Indonesia (–)	Mongolia (–)*	Afghanistan (–)	Bangladesh (–)

* Mongolia withdrew from the tournament.

== Venues ==
Preliminary round and Final twelve	Preliminary round, 13th–17th places and Final twelve
Urmia, Iran
Ghadir Arena	Shahidan Ahandoust Hall
Capacity: 6,000	Capacity: 3,000

== Pool standing procedure ==
1. Total number of victories (matches won, matches lost)
2. In the event of a tie, the following first tiebreaker will apply: The teams will be ranked by the most point gained per match as follows:
  - Match won 3–0 or 3–1: 3 points for the winner, 0 points for the loser
  - Match won 3–2: 2 points for the winner, 1 point for the loser
  - Match forfeited: 3 points for the winner, 0 points (0–25, 0–25, 0–25) for the loser
3. If teams are still tied after examining the number of victories and points gained, then the AVC will examine the results in order to break the tie in the following order:
  - Set quotient: if two or more teams are tied on the number of points gained, they will be ranked by the quotient resulting from the division of the number of all set won by the number of all sets lost.
  - Points quotient: if the tie persists based on the set quotient, the teams will be ranked by the quotient resulting from the division of all points scored by the total of points lost during all sets.
  - If the tie persists based on the point quotient, the tie will be broken based on the team that won the match of the Round Robin Phase between the tied teams. When the tie in point quotient is between three or more teams, these teams ranked taking into consideration only the matches involving the teams in question.

== Preliminary round ==
- All times are Iran Standard Time (UTC+03:30).

=== Pool A ===
Pos	Team	Pld	W	L	Pts	SW	SL	SR	SPW	SPL	SPR	Qualification
1	Iran (H)	2	2	0	6	6	1	6.000	169	111	1.523	Final twelve
2	Iraq	2	1	1	2	4	5	0.800	167	193	0.865	Final twelve
3	Hong Kong	2	0	2	1	2	6	0.333	144	176	0.818	13th–17th places

Source: Men's Asian Senior Championship 2023
(H) Host

Date	Time	Venue		Score		Set 1	Set 2	Set 3	Set 4	Set 5	Total	Report
19 Aug	16:15	SAH	Hong Kong	2–3	Iraq	21–25	16–25	25–14	25–22	12–15	99–101	P2 Report
20 Aug	19:15	GHA	Iran	3–0	Hong Kong	25–14	25–15	25–16			75–45	P2 Report
21 Aug	19:15	GHA	Iraq	1–3	Iran	25–19	12–25	15–25	14–25		66–94	P2 Report

=== Pool B ===
Pos	Team	Pld	W	L	Pts	SW	SL	SR	SPW	SPL	SPR	Qualification
1	Japan	2	2	0	6	6	0	MAX	150	102	1.471	Final twelve
2	Thailand	2	1	1	3	3	3	1.000	137	128	1.070	Final twelve
3	Uzbekistan	2	0	2	0	0	6	0.000	93	150	0.620	13th–17th places

Source: Men's Asian Senior Championship 2023

Date	Time	Venue		Score		Set 1	Set 2	Set 3	Set 4	Set 5	Total	Report
19 Aug	13:15	GHA	Japan	3–0	Thailand	25–19	25–21	25–22			75–62	P2 Report
20 Aug	13:15	GHA	Uzbekistan	0–3	Japan	8–25	19–25	13–25			40–75	P2 Report
21 Aug	13:15	GHA	Thailand	3–0	Uzbekistan	25–17	25–20	25–16			75–53	P2 Report

=== Pool C ===
Pos	Team	Pld	W	L	Pts	SW	SL	SR	SPW	SPL	SPR	Qualification
1	China	2	2	0	4	6	4	1.500	220	203	1.084	Final twelve
2	Indonesia	2	1	1	4	5	4	1.250	206	191	1.079	Final twelve
3	Kazakhstan	2	0	2	1	3	6	0.500	174	206	0.845	13th–17th places

Source: Men's Asian Senior Championship 2023

Date	Time	Venue		Score		Set 1	Set 2	Set 3	Set 4	Set 5	Total	Report
19 Aug	13:15	SAH	Indonesia	2–3	China	22–25	25–22	19–25	28–26	13–15	107–113	P2 Report
20 Aug	13:15	SAH	Kazakhstan	1–3	Indonesia	26–24	19–25	12–25	21–25		78–99	P2 Report
21 Aug	13:15	SAH	China	3–2	Kazakhstan	20–25	25–17	22–25	25–17	15–12	107–96	P2 Report

=== Pool D ===
Pos	Team	Pld	W	L	Pts	SW	SL	SR	SPW	SPL	SPR	Qualification
1	Chinese Taipei	1	1	0	2	3	2	1.500	110	104	1.058	Final twelve
2	Bahrain	1	0	1	1	2	3	0.667	104	110	0.945	Final twelve

Source: Men's Asian Senior Championship 2023

Date	Time	Venue		Score		Set 1	Set 2	Set 3	Set 4	Set 5	Total	Report
20 Aug	19:15	SAH	Bahrain	2–3	Chinese Taipei	25–23	25–22	21–25	22–25	11–15	104–110	P2 Report

=== Pool E ===
Pos	Team	Pld	W	L	Pts	SW	SL	SR	SPW	SPL	SPR	Qualification
1	Qatar	2	2	0	6	6	0	MAX	150	112	1.339	Final twelve
2	India	2	1	1	3	3	4	0.750	156	157	0.994	Final twelve
3	Afghanistan	2	0	2	0	1	6	0.167	136	173	0.786	13th–17th places

Source: Men's Asian Senior Championship 2023

Date	Time	Venue		Score		Set 1	Set 2	Set 3	Set 4	Set 5	Total	Report
19 Aug	16:15	GHA	Qatar	3–0	India	25–20	25–19	25–19			75–58	P2 Report
20 Aug	16:15	GHA	Afghanistan	0–3	Qatar	19–25	16–25	19–25			54–75	P2 Report
21 Aug	16:15	SAH	India	3–1	Afghanistan	25–15	25–23	23–25	25–19		98–82	P2 Report

=== Pool F ===
Pos	Team	Pld	W	L	Pts	SW	SL	SR	SPW	SPL	SPR	Qualification
1	South Korea	2	2	0	6	6	1	6.000	183	160	1.144	Final twelve
2	Pakistan	2	1	1	3	4	3	1.333	175	160	1.094	Final twelve
3	Bangladesh	2	0	2	0	0	6	0.000	112	150	0.747	13th–17th places

Source: Men's Asian Senior Championship 2023

Date	Time	Venue		Score		Set 1	Set 2	Set 3	Set 4	Set 5	Total	Report
19 Aug	19:15	GHA	Bangladesh	0–3	South Korea	19–25	22–25	19–25			60–75	P2 Report
20 Aug	16:15	SAH	Pakistan	3–0	Bangladesh	25–16	25–14	25–22			75–52	P2 Report
21 Aug	16:15	GHA	South Korea	3–1	Pakistan	26–28	25–20	32–30	25–22		108–100	P2 Report

== Final round ==
=== 13th–17th places ===
13th–17th places
23 August
Uzbekistan	1
Kazakhstan	3
Afghanistan	W
Bye

13th–16th places
24 August
Hong Kong	0
Kazakhstan	3
24 August
Bangladesh	1
Afghanistan	3

13th place match
25 August
Kazakhstan	3
Afghanistan	1
15th place match
25 August
Hong Kong	1
Bangladesh	3

==== 13th–17th places ====
Date	Time	Venue		Score		Set 1	Set 2	Set 3	Set 4	Set 5	Total	Report
23 Aug	13:15	SAH	Uzbekistan	1–3	Kazakhstan	25–18	23–25	17–25	19–25		84–93	P2 Report

==== 13th–16th places ====
Date	Time	Venue		Score		Set 1	Set 2	Set 3	Set 4	Set 5	Total	Report
24 Aug	13:15	SAH	Hong Kong	0–3	Kazakhstan	18–25	17–25	17–25			52–75	P2 Report
24 Aug	16:15	SAH	Bangladesh	1–3	Afghanistan	25–22	21–25	23–25	21–25		90–97	P2 Report

==== 15th place match ====
Date	Time	Venue		Score		Set 1	Set 2	Set 3	Set 4	Set 5	Total	Report
25 Aug	10:15	SAH	Hong Kong	1–3	Bangladesh	22–25	23–25	25–20	19–25		89–95	P2 Report

==== 13th place match ====
Date	Time	Venue		Score		Set 1	Set 2	Set 3	Set 4	Set 5	Total	Report
25 Aug	13:15	SAH	Kazakhstan	3–1	Afghanistan	23–25	25–20	25–17	25–13		98–75	P2 Report

=== Final twelve ===
Round of 12
23 August
Iran	3
Pakistan	0
23 August
China	3
India	2
23 August
South Korea	3
Indonesia	2
23 August
Japan	3
Bahrain	0
23 August
Chinese Taipei	3
Iraq	0
23 August
Qatar	3
Thailand	0

Quarterfinals
24 August
China	3
South Korea	1
24 August
Chinese Taipei	0
Qatar	3

Semifinals
25 August
Iran	3
China	0
25 August
Japan	3
Qatar	1

Final
26 August
Iran	0
Japan	3
3rd place match
26 August
China	0
Qatar	3

5th place match
25 August
South Korea	3
Chinese Taipei	1

7th–12th places
24 August
India	0
Indonesia	3
24 August
Iraq	1
Thailand	3

7th–10th places
25 August
Pakistan	3
Indonesia	2
25 August
Bahrain	3
Thailand	2

7th place match
26 August
Pakistan	3
Bahrain	1
9th place match
26 August
Indonesia	3
Thailand	0

11th place match
25 August
India	3
Iraq	0

==== Round of 12 ====
Date	Time	Venue		Score		Set 1	Set 2	Set 3	Set 4	Set 5	Total	Report
23 Aug	10:15	GHA	South Korea	3–2	Indonesia	25–16	19–25	22–25	25–19	16–14	107–99	P2 Report
23 Aug	13:15	GHA	Japan	3–0	Bahrain	25–14	25–14	25–17			75–45	P2 Report
23 Aug	16:15	GHA	Qatar	3–0	Thailand	25–23	25–19	25–22			75–64	P2 Report
23 Aug	16:15	SAH	China	3–2	India	31–29	19–25	25–18	22–25	15–13	112–110	P2 Report
23 Aug	19:15	GHA	Iran	3–0	Pakistan	25–18	25–15	25–13			75–46	P2 Report
23 Aug	19:15	SAH	Chinese Taipei	3–0	Iraq	25–19	25–18	25–18			75–55	P2 Report

==== 7th–12th places ====
Date	Time	Venue		Score		Set 1	Set 2	Set 3	Set 4	Set 5	Total	Report
24 Aug	10:15	GHA	India	0–3	Indonesia	29–31	18–25	12–25			59–81	P2 Report
24 Aug	13:15	GHA	Iraq	1–3	Thailand	25–22	19–25	20–25	18–25		82–97	P2 Report

==== Quarterfinals ====
Date	Time	Venue		Score		Set 1	Set 2	Set 3	Set 4	Set 5	Total	Report
24 Aug	16:15	GHA	Chinese Taipei	0–3	Qatar	16–25	15–25	23–25			54–75	P2 Report
24 Aug	19:15	GHA	China	3–1	South Korea	21–25	25–22	28–26	25–18		99–91	P2 Report

==== 7th–10th places ====
Date	Time	Venue		Score		Set 1	Set 2	Set 3	Set 4	Set 5	Total	Report
25 Aug	10:15	GHA	Pakistan	3–2	Indonesia	19–25	25–22	23–25	25–13	15–12	107–97	P2 Report
25 Aug	13:15	GHA	Bahrain	3–2	Thailand	17–25	20–25	25–23	25–21	15–10	102–104	P2 Report

==== Semifinals ====
Date	Time	Venue		Score		Set 1	Set 2	Set 3	Set 4	Set 5	Total	Report
25 Aug	16:15	GHA	Japan	3–1	Qatar	22–25	25–18	25–14	28–26		100–83	P2 Report
25 Aug	19:15	GHA	Iran	3–0	China	25–20	25–23	25–23			75–66	P2 Report

==== 11th place match ====
Date	Time	Venue		Score		Set 1	Set 2	Set 3	Set 4	Set 5	Total	Report
25 Aug	16:15	SAH	India	3–0	Iraq	25–17	25–23	25–16			75–56	P2 Report

==== 9th place match ====
Date	Time	Venue		Score		Set 1	Set 2	Set 3	Set 4	Set 5	Total	Report
26 Aug	10:00	SAH	Indonesia	3–0	Thailand	25–21	25–23	25–21			75–65	P2 Report

==== 7th place match ====
Date	Time	Venue		Score		Set 1	Set 2	Set 3	Set 4	Set 5	Total	Report
26 Aug	13:00	SAH	Pakistan	3–1	Bahrain	25–22	21–25	25–18	25–18		96–83	P2 Report

==== 5th place match ====
Date	Time	Venue		Score		Set 1	Set 2	Set 3	Set 4	Set 5	Total	Report
25 Aug	19:15	SAH	South Korea	3–1	Chinese Taipei	18–25	25–23	25–14	25–19		93–81	P2 Report

==== 3rd place match ====
Date	Time	Venue		Score		Set 1	Set 2	Set 3	Set 4	Set 5	Total	Report
26 Aug	15:00	GHA	China	0–3	Qatar	23–25	19–25	18–25			60–75	P2 Report

==== Final ====
Date	Time	Venue		Score		Set 1	Set 2	Set 3	Set 4	Set 5	Total	Report
26 Aug	18:00	GHA	Iran	0–3	Japan	20–25	18–25	18–25			56–75	P2 Report

== Final standing ==
Rank	Team
1st place, gold medalist(s)	Japan
2nd place, silver medalist(s)	Iran
3rd place, bronze medalist(s)	Qatar
4	China
5	South Korea
6	Chinese Taipei
7	Pakistan
8	Bahrain
9	Indonesia
10	Thailand
11	India
12	Iraq
13	Kazakhstan
14	Afghanistan
15	Bangladesh
16	Hong Kong
17	Uzbekistan

Qualified for the 2025 World Championship
Qualified for the 2025 World Championship via FIVB World Ranking

2023 Asian Men's champions

Japan
10th title

14–man roster
Yuji Nishida, Taishi Onodera, Kento Miyaura, Tatsunori Otsuka, Akihiro Yamauchi, Masahiro Sekita, Kentaro Takahashi, Ran Takahashi, Tomohiro Ogawa, Yūki Ishikawa, Tomohiro Yamamoto, Larry Evbade-Dan, Ryu Yamamoto, Masato Kai
Head coach
Philippe Blain

== Awards ==
Yūki Ishikawa was the 2023 AVC Championship Most Valuable Player

- Most valuable player
  Yūki Ishikawa (JPN)
- Best setter
  Mohammad Taher Vadi (IRI)
- Best outside spikers
  Ran Takahashi (JPN)
  Raimi Wadidie (QAT)
- Best middle blockers
  Belal Nabel Abunabot (QAT)
  Taishi Onodera (JPN)
- Best opposite spiker
  Amin Esmaeilnejad (IRI)
- Best libero
  Yang Yiming (CHN)

== See also ==
- 2023 Asian Women's Volleyball Championship
- 2023 Asian Men's Club Volleyball Championship
- 2023 Asian Men's Volleyball Challenge Cup
