= Syed Atiqur Rahman =

Bangladeshi volleyball player

Personal information
- Full name: Syed Atiqur Rahman
- Born: 21 May 1975 (age 51); Bangladesh
- Height: 172 cm (5 ft 8 in)
- Weight: 72 kg (159 lb)
- Spike: 302 cm (119 in)
- Block: 280 cm (110 in)

Career
| Years | Teams |
|---|---|
| 2018 | Bangladesh men's national volleyball team |

National team
| Bangladesh |

Syed Atiqur Rahman (born 21 May 1975), also known as Atiqur, is a Bangladeshi volleyball player who plays for the Bangladesh men's national volleyball team. He was one of the 15 players selected represent the country at the Bangabandhu Asian Men's Central International Volleyball Championship which was hosted by Bangladesh Volleyball Federation (BFV) at Shaheed Suhrawardy Indoor Stadium in 2018.

== National and international participation ==
1. Bangabandhu Asian Men's Central International Volleyball Championship - 2018
