= Takuya Takahashi =

Japanese footballer (born 1989)

Takuya Takahashi 高橋 拓也
Personal information
- Full name: Takuya Takahashi
- Date of birth: 30 June 1989 (age 37)
- Place of birth: Kanagawa, Japan
- Height: 1.81 m (5 ft 11 in)
- Position: Goalkeeper

Team information
- Current team: Kamatamare Sanuki
- Number: 1

Youth career
- 2005–2007: Fujisawa High School
- 2008–2011: Kanagawa University

Senior career*
Years	Team	Apps	(Gls)
2012–2015	YSCC Yokohama	123	(0)
2016	Yokohama F. Marinos	0	(0)
2017–	Giravanz Kitakyushu	72	(0)
2021–	Kamatamare Sanuki	42	(0)
- * Club domestic league appearances and goals as of 9 August 2022

Takuya Takahashi (高橋 拓也, Takahashi, Takuya; born 30 June 1989 in Kanagawa) is a Japanese footballer who plays for Kamatamare Sanuki.

== Club statistics ==
Updated to 9 August 2022.

Club performance			League		Cup		League Cup		Total	
Season	Club	League	Apps	Goals	Apps	Goals	Apps	Goals	Apps	Goals
Japan			League		Emperor's Cup		J. League Cup		Total	
2012	YSCC Yokohama	JFL	31	0	2	0	–		33	0
2013	YSCC Yokohama	JFL	28	0	–		–		28	0
2014	YSCC Yokohama	J3 League	28	0	2	0	–		30	0
2015	YSCC Yokohama	J3 League	36	0	–		–		36	0
2016	Yokohama F. Marinos	J1 League	0	0	0	0	0	0	0	0
2017	Giravanz Kitakyushu	J3 League	16	0	2	0	–		18	0
2018	Giravanz Kitakyushu	J3 League	23	0	0	0	–		23	0
2019	Giravanz Kitakyushu	J3 League	31	0	2	0	–		33	0
2020	Giravanz Kitakyushu	J2 League	2	0	0	0	–		2	0
2021	Kamatamare Sanuki	J3 League	23	0	1	0	–		24	0
2022	Kamatamare Sanuki	J3 League	19	0	0	0	–		19	0
Career total			237	0	9	0	0	0	246	0
