= Sri Lanka Volleyball Federation =

Sports governing body in Sri Lanka

Sri Lanka Volleyball
- Sport: Volleyball
- Jurisdiction: Sri Lanka
- Abbreviation: SLVF
- Founded: 1951; 74 years ago
- Affiliation: FIVB
- Regional affiliation: AVC
- Location: 33 Torington Place, Colombo
- President: Sajeewa Medawatte
- Secretary: Akhila de Alwis

Official website
- srilankavolleyball.lk
- (Sri Lanka)

Sri Lanka Volleyball Federation (SLVF) is the main governing body of volleyball in Sri Lanka, where volleyball is its national sport. The game of volleyball was introduced to Sri Lanka (then Ceylon) in 1916 by R. W. Camack, then Director of Physical Education at the Colombo Y.M.C.A.

The Federation is built on 99 affiliated organisations and managed by an honorary committee of 25 members. The current president of SLVF is Kanchana Jayarathna, the chairman of Sabaragamuwa Provincial Council and the current secretary general is A. S. Nalaka.

It also has international affiliations to the Fédération Internationale de Volleyball and Asian Volleyball Confederation. It is also accredited to the National Olympic Committee (NOC) of Sri Lanka. From, 1980, the Federation participated in the Asian Senior and Junior Men's and Women's Championships. In 2002 the Federation hosted the 12th Asian Junior Women's Championship, in 2014 hosted the 10th Asian Youth Boys Volleyball Championship and in 2018 hosted the 1st Asian Challenge Cup Volleyball Championship.

The national coaches are affiliated to the SLVF.

== National teams ==
For details please refer to main articles for dedicated teams.

Men's

- Sri Lanka men's national volleyball team
- Under-21
- Under-19
- Under-17

Women's

- Sri Lanka women's national volleyball team
- Under-21
- Under-19
- Under-17
