= Bangladesh men's national volleyball team =

National sports team

Bangladesh
- Association: Bangladesh Volleyball Federation (BVF)
- Confederation: AVC
- Head coach: (Iran) Ali Pour Aroji
- FIVB ranking: NR (5 October 2025)

Uniforms
Home	Away

Summer Olympics
- Appearances: 0

World Cup
- Appearances: 0

Asian Championship
- Appearances: 3 (First in 1989)
- Best result: 15th (2023)

The Bangladesh men's national volleyball team (Bengali: বাংলাদেশ পুরুষ জাতীয় ভলিবল দল) is the national men's volleyball team of Bangladesh. It is governed by the Bangladesh Volleyball Federation (BVF) and takes part in international volleyball competitions and friendly matches.

Bangladesh joined FIVB in 1978. They rank 65th in the FIVB World Rankings (as of August 2020).

== Tournament records ==
=== Olympic Games ===
Champions Runners up

Summer Olympics records
Year	Result	Pld	W	L	SW	SL
(Japan) 1964	Part of Pakistan					
(Mexico) 1968	Part of Pakistan					
(West Germany) 1972	Did not qualify					
(Canada) 1976	Did not qualify					
(Soviet Union) 1980	Did not qualify					
(United States) 1984	Did not qualify					
(South Korea) 1988	Did not qualify					
(Spain) 1992	Did not qualify					
(United States) 1996	Did not qualify					
(Australia) 2000	Did not qualify					
(Greece) 2004	Did not qualify					
(China) 2008	Did not qualify					
(United Kingdom) 2012	Did not qualify					
(Brazil) 2016	Did not qualify					
(Japan) 2020	Did not qualify					
(France) 2024	Did not qualify					
(United States) 2028	To be determined					
(Australia) 2032	To be determined					
Total	0 Title	0/18	0	0	0	0

=== Asian Championship ===
Champions Runners up

Asian Men's Volleyball Championship records
Year	Result	Position	Pld	W	L	SW	SL
(Australia) 1975	Did not enter						
(Bahrain) 1979	Did not enter						
(Japan) 1983	Did not enter						
(Kuwait) 1987	Did not enter						
(South Korea) 1989	Preliminary round	17/19	4	0	4	0	12
(Australia) 1991	Did not enter						
(Thailand) 1993	Group stage	16/16	4	0	4	0	12
(South Korea) 1995	Did not enter						
(Qatar) 1997	Did not enter						
(Iran) 1999	Did not enter						
(South Korea) 2001	Did not enter						
(China) 2003	Did not enter						
(Thailand) 2005	Did not enter						
(Indonesia) 2007	Did not enter						
(Philippines) 2009	Did not enter						
(Iran) 2011	Did not enter						
(United Arab Emirates) 2013	Did not enter						
(Iran) 2015	Did not enter						
(Indonesia) 2017	Did not enter						
(Iran) 2019	Did not enter						
(Japan) 2021	Did not enter						
(Iran) 2023	Final round	15/17	4	1	3	4	10
Total	0 Title	3/22	12	1	11	4	34

=== Asian Games ===
Champions Runners up

Asian Games records
Year	Result	Position	Pld	W	L	SW	SL
(Iran) 1974	Did not enter						
(Thailand) 1978	Group stage	11/16	6	3	3	9	10
(India) 1982	Group stage	13/15	3	0	3	0	9
(South Korea) 1986	Did not enter						
(China) 1990	Did not enter						
(Japan) 1994	Did not enter						
(Thailand) 1998	Did not enter						
(South Korea) 2002	Did not enter						
(Qatar) 2006	Did not enter						
(China) 2010	Did not enter						
(South Korea) 2014	Did not enter						
(Indonesia) 2018	Did not enter						
(China) 2022	Did not enter						
Total	2/13	0 Title	9	3	6	9	19

=== Asian Cup ===
Champions Runners up

Asian Men's Volleyball Cup records
Year	Result	Position	Pld	W	L	SW	SL
(Thailand) 2008	Did not qualify						
(Iran) 2010	Did not qualify						
(Vietnam) 2012	Did not qualify						
(Kazakhstan) 2014	Did not qualify						
(Thailand) 2016	Did not qualify						
(Taiwan) 2018	Did not qualify						
(Thailand) 2022	Did not qualify						
Total	0 Title	0/7	0	0	0	0	0

=== CAVA Nations League ===
Champions Runners up

CAVA Men's Volleyball Nations League records
Year	Result	Position	Pld	W	L	SW	SL
(Pakistan) 2022	Round-robin	3/5	5	2	3	5	10
Total	0 Title	1/1	5	2	3	5	10

=== CAVA Challenge Cup ===
Champions Runners up

CAVA Challenge Cup records
Year	Result	Position	Pld	W	L	SW	SL
(Sri Lanka) 2023	Round-robin	6/6	5	1	4	8	14
Total	0 Title	1/1	5	1	4	8	14

=== Islamic Solidarity Games ===
Champions Runners up

Islamic Solidarity Games records
Year	Result	Position	Pld	W	L	SW	SL
(Saudi Arabia) 2005	Did not participate						
(Iran) 2010	Tournament did not held						
(Indonesia) 2013	Did not participate						
(Azerbaijan) 2017	Did not participate						
(Turkey) 2021	Did not participate						
(Saudi Arabia) 2025	Did not participate						
Total	0 Title	0/5	0	0	0	0	0

== Current squad ==
The following is the Bangladeshi roster at the 2016 South Asian Games.

- Head coach: (Bangladesh) Imdadul Haque
- Assistant coach: (Bangladesh) Nazrul Islam
- Assistant coach: (Bangladesh) Masud Hafiz
1. Masud Hossain
2. Horosit Biswas
3. Sheikh Shihab Ahmed
4. Monir Hossain
5. Humayun Kabir
6. Mohammad Saiduzzaman
7. Shahjahan Ali
8. Shohel Rana
9. Sayed Al Zabir
10. Kaiser Hamid
11. Mohsinuddin
12. Aslam Hossain
13. Sona Miah
14. Syed Atiqur Rahman
15. Mahibul Rabbi
