= 2011 Asian Men's Volleyball Championship =

International volleyball tournament

- 2011 Asian Men's Volleyball Championship logo

Tournament details
- Host country: Iran
- City: Tehran
- Dates: 21–29 September
- Teams: 16
- Venues: 2 (in 1 host city)

Final positions
- Champions: Iran (1st title)
- Runners-up: China
- Third place: South Korea
- Fourth place: Australia

Tournament awards
- MVP: (Iran) Arash Kamalvand

The Asian Men's Volleyball Championship was the sixteenth staging of the Asian Men's Volleyball Championship, a biennial international volleyball tournament organised by the Asian Volleyball Confederation (AVC) with Islamic Republic of Iran Volleyball Federation (IRIVF). The tournament was held in Tehran, Iran from 21 to 29 September 2011.

== Venues ==
Preliminary Round (All matches of Iran, China, Japan and South Korea), Pool E, F and Final Round	Preliminary Round, Pool G, H and Classification 9th–16th
Tehran, Iran
Azadi Indoor Stadium	Azadi Volleyball Hall
Capacity: 12,000	Capacity: 3,000

== Pools composition ==
The teams are seeded by addition of ranking of 2009 Asian Men's Volleyball Championship and FIVB World Rankings divided by 2.

Pool A	Pool B	Pool C	Pool D
Iran (Host & 3rd); India (8th); Afghanistan; Chinese Taipei	China (1st); Indonesia (7th); Sri Lanka; Uzbekistan	Japan (2nd); Kazakhstan (6th); Pakistan; Thailand	South Korea (4th); Australia (5th); Turkmenistan; Qatar

== Preliminary round ==
=== Pool A ===
Pos	Team	Pld	W	L	Pts	SW	SL	SR	SPW	SPL	SPR	Qualification
1	Iran	3	3	0	9	9	0	MAX	230	163	1.411	Final eight (Pools E and F)
2	India	3	2	1	5	6	5	1.200	249	219	1.137	Final eight (Pools E and F)
3	Chinese Taipei	3	1	2	4	5	6	0.833	238	230	1.035	9th–16th places (Pools G and H)
4	Afghanistan	3	0	3	0	0	9	0.000	120	225	0.533	9th–16th places (Pools G and H)

Date	Time		Score		Set 1	Set 2	Set 3	Set 4	Set 5	Total	Report
21 Sep	14:00	India	3–2	Chinese Taipei	25–20	20–25	27–25	20–25	15–12	107–107	Report
21 Sep	18:30	Afghanistan	0–3	Iran	13–25	19–25	8–25			40–75	Report
22 Sep	16:00	India	3–0	Afghanistan	25–9	25–13	25–11			75–33	Report
22 Sep	18:30	Chinese Taipei	0–3	Iran	15–25	24–26	17–25			56–76	Report
23 Sep	18:30	Iran	3–0	India	27–25	25–17	27–25			79–67	Report
23 Sep	18:30	Afghanistan	0–3	Chinese Taipei	12–25	19–25	16–25			47–75	Report

=== Pool B ===
Pos	Team	Pld	W	L	Pts	SW	SL	SR	SPW	SPL	SPR	Qualification
1	China	3	3	0	9	9	0	MAX	225	141	1.596	Final eight (Pools E and F)
2	Sri Lanka	3	2	1	5	6	5	1.200	230	240	0.958	Final eight (Pools E and F)
3	Indonesia	3	1	2	4	5	7	0.714	262	260	1.008	9th–16th places (Pools G and H)
4	Uzbekistan	3	0	3	0	1	9	0.111	172	248	0.694	9th–16th places (Pools G and H)

Date	Time		Score		Set 1	Set 2	Set 3	Set 4	Set 5	Total	Report
21 Sep	10:00	China	3–0	Sri Lanka	25–16	25–16	25–13			75–45	Report
21 Sep	18:30	Indonesia	3–1	Uzbekistan	23–25	25–14	25–14	25–22		98–75	Report
22 Sep	14:00	Indonesia	0–3	China	22–25	19–25	14–25			55–75	Report
22 Sep	14:00	Uzbekistan	0–3	Sri Lanka	21–25	13–25	22–25			56–75	Report
23 Sep	14:00	Sri Lanka	3–2	Indonesia	25–20	28–26	21–25	21–25	15–13	110–109	Report
23 Sep	16:00	China	3–0	Uzbekistan	25–16	25–9	25–16			75–41	Report

=== Pool C ===
Pos	Team	Pld	W	L	Pts	SW	SL	SR	SPW	SPL	SPR	Qualification
1	Japan	3	3	0	8	9	2	4.500	262	218	1.202	Final eight (Pools E and F)
2	Pakistan	3	2	1	6	8	5	1.600	279	281	0.993	Final eight (Pools E and F)
3	Kazakhstan	3	1	2	3	5	8	0.625	273	277	0.986	9th–16th places (Pools G and H)
4	Thailand	3	0	3	1	2	9	0.222	220	258	0.853	9th–16th places (Pools G and H)

Date	Time		Score		Set 1	Set 2	Set 3	Set 4	Set 5	Total	Report
21 Sep	16:00	Japan	3–0	Thailand	25–20	25–23	25–16			75–59	Report
21 Sep	16:00	Pakistan	3–2	Kazakhstan	22–25	25–21	25–21	20–25	15–11	107–103	Report
22 Sep	16:00	Pakistan	2–3	Japan	20–25	28–26	25–21	16–25	5–15	94–112	Report
22 Sep	18:30	Kazakhstan	3–2	Thailand	25–13	18–25	22–25	25–20	15–12	105–95	Report
23 Sep	10:00	Thailand	0–3	Pakistan	19–25	21–25	26–28			66–78	Report
23 Sep	14:00	Japan	3–0	Kazakhstan	25–23	25–19	25–23			75–65	Report

=== Pool D ===
Pos	Team	Pld	W	L	Pts	SW	SL	SR	SPW	SPL	SPR	Qualification
1	Australia	3	3	0	8	9	2	4.500	269	207	1.300	Final eight (Pools E and F)
2	South Korea	3	2	1	7	8	3	2.667	259	220	1.177	Final eight (Pools E and F)
3	Qatar	3	1	2	3	3	6	0.500	187	220	0.850	9th–16th places (Pools G and H)
4	Turkmenistan	3	0	3	0	0	9	0.000	157	225	0.698	9th–16th places (Pools G and H)

Date	Time		Score		Set 1	Set 2	Set 3	Set 4	Set 5	Total	Report
21 Sep	10:00	Qatar	3–0	Turkmenistan	25–23	25–21	25–22			75–66	Report
21 Sep	14:00	Australia	3–2	South Korea	25–20	29–31	25–20	25–27	15–7	119–105	Report
22 Sep	10:00	Australia	3–0	Qatar	25–20	25–18	25–21			75–59	Report
22 Sep	10:00	South Korea	3–0	Turkmenistan	25–17	25–16	25–15			75–48	Report
23 Sep	10:00	Qatar	0–3	South Korea	27–29	14–25	12–25			53–79	Report
23 Sep	16:00	Turkmenistan	0–3	Australia	14–25	12–25	17–25			43–75	Report

== Classification round ==
- The results and the points of the matches between the same teams that were already played during the preliminary round shall be taken into account for the classification round.

=== Pool E ===
Pos	Team	Pld	W	L	Pts	SW	SL	SR	SPW	SPL	SPR	Qualification
1	Iran	3	3	0	9	9	0	MAX	229	171	1.339	Quarterfinals
2	India	3	2	1	5	6	6	1.000	269	285	0.944	Quarterfinals
3	Japan	3	1	2	2	4	8	0.500	270	269	1.004	Quarterfinals
4	Pakistan	3	0	3	2	4	9	0.444	246	289	0.851	Quarterfinals

Date	Time		Score		Set 1	Set 2	Set 3	Set 4	Set 5	Total	Report
25 Sep	14:00	Japan	1–3	India	25–20	28–30	21–25	23–25		97–100	Report
25 Sep	18:30	Iran	3–0	Pakistan	25–18	25–14	25–11			75–43	Report
26 Sep	10:00	India	3–2	Pakistan	25–23	25–23	19–25	18–25	15–13	102–109	Report
26 Sep	18:30	Iran	3–0	Japan	25–22	25–22	25–17			75–61	Report

=== Pool F ===
Pos	Team	Pld	W	L	Pts	SW	SL	SR	SPW	SPL	SPR	Qualification
1	Australia	3	3	0	8	9	3	3.000	293	244	1.201	Quarterfinals
2	South Korea	3	2	1	6	8	5	1.600	308	296	1.041	Quarterfinals
3	China	3	1	2	4	6	6	1.000	286	264	1.083	Quarterfinals
4	Sri Lanka	3	0	3	0	0	9	0.000	150	233	0.644	Quarterfinals

Date	Time		Score		Set 1	Set 2	Set 3	Set 4	Set 5	Total	Report
25 Sep	10:00	Australia	3–0	Sri Lanka	25–16	25–19	25–13			75–48	Report
25 Sep	16:00	China	2–3	South Korea	25–20	34–36	25–21	20–25	16–18	120–120	Report
26 Sep	14:00	Sri Lanka	0–3	South Korea	13–25	13–25	31–33			57–83	Report
26 Sep	16:00	China	1–3	Australia	25–22	25–27	23–25	18–25		91–99	Report

=== Pool G ===
Pos	Team	Pld	W	L	Pts	SW	SL	SR	SPW	SPL	SPR	Qualification
1	Kazakhstan	3	3	0	8	9	2	4.500	255	185	1.378	9th–12th places
2	Thailand	3	2	1	7	8	4	2.000	266	237	1.122	9th–12th places
3	Chinese Taipei	3	1	2	3	4	6	0.667	212	218	0.972	13th–16th places
4	Afghanistan	3	0	3	0	0	9	0.000	132	225	0.587	13th–16th places

Date	Time		Score		Set 1	Set 2	Set 3	Set 4	Set 5	Total	Report
25 Sep	10:00	Chinese Taipei	1–3	Thailand	18–25	20–25	25–21	20–25		83–96	Report
25 Sep	14:00	Kazakhstan	3–0	Afghanistan	25–14	25–13	25–9			75–36	Report
26 Sep	10:00	Afghanistan	0–3	Thailand	13–25	16–25	20–25			49–75	Report
26 Sep	14:00	Chinese Taipei	0–3	Kazakhstan	17–25	15–25	22–25			54–75	Report

=== Pool H ===
Pos	Team	Pld	W	L	Pts	SW	SL	SR	SPW	SPL	SPR	Qualification
1	Indonesia	3	3	0	9	9	3	3.000	299	256	1.168	9th–12th places
2	Qatar	3	2	1	6	7	3	2.333	242	230	1.052	9th–12th places
3	Turkmenistan	3	1	2	3	4	7	0.571	254	258	0.984	13th–16th places
4	Uzbekistan	3	0	3	0	2	9	0.222	221	272	0.813	13th–16th places

Date	Time		Score		Set 1	Set 2	Set 3	Set 4	Set 5	Total	Report
25 Sep	16:00	Indonesia	3–1	Turkmenistan	25–20	25–22	25–27	25–22		100–91	Report
25 Sep	18:30	Qatar	3–0	Uzbekistan	25–20	27–25	25–18			77–63	Report
26 Sep	16:00	Uzbekistan	1–3	Turkmenistan	18–25	25–22	20–25	20–25		83–97	Report
26 Sep	18:30	Indonesia	3–1	Qatar	23–25	28–26	25–22	25–17		101–90	Report

== Classification 13th–16th ==
13th–16th places
27 September – Tehran
Chinese Taipei	3
Uzbekistan	0
27 September – Tehran
Turkmenistan	3
Afghanistan	1

13th place
28 September – Tehran
Chinese Taipei	3
Turkmenistan	2
15th place
28 September – Tehran
Uzbekistan	1
Afghanistan	3

=== Semifinals ===
Date	Time		Score		Set 1	Set 2	Set 3	Set 4	Set 5	Total	Report
27 Sep	10:00	Chinese Taipei	3–0	Uzbekistan	25–15	25–14	25–14			75–43	Report
27 Sep	14:00	Turkmenistan	3–1	Afghanistan	26–24	25–20	17–25	25–15		93–84	Report

=== 15th place ===
Date	Time		Score		Set 1	Set 2	Set 3	Set 4	Set 5	Total	Report
28 Sep	10:00	Uzbekistan	1–3	Afghanistan	25–27	25–23	22–25	19–25		91–100	Report

=== 13th place ===
Date	Time		Score		Set 1	Set 2	Set 3	Set 4	Set 5	Total	Report
28 Sep	14:00	Chinese Taipei	3–2	Turkmenistan	18–25	22–25	25–19	25–18	15–7	105–94	Report

== Classification 9th–12th ==
9th–12th places
27 September – Tehran
Kazakhstan	3
Qatar	2
27 September – Tehran
Indonesia	0
Thailand	3

9th place
28 September – Tehran
Kazakhstan	3
Thailand	0
11th place
28 September – Tehran
Qatar	2
Indonesia	3

=== Semifinals ===
Date	Time		Score		Set 1	Set 2	Set 3	Set 4	Set 5	Total	Report
27 Sep	16:00	Kazakhstan	3–2	Qatar	20–25	25–18	25–15	23–25	15–7	108–90	Report
27 Sep	18:30	Indonesia	0–3	Thailand	17–25	20–25	21–25			58–75	Report

=== 11th place ===
Date	Time		Score		Set 1	Set 2	Set 3	Set 4	Set 5	Total	Report
28 Sep	16:00	Qatar	2–3	Indonesia	25–23	22–25	25–22	22–25	16–18	110–113	Report

=== 9th place ===
Date	Time		Score		Set 1	Set 2	Set 3	Set 4	Set 5	Total	Report
28 Sep	18:30	Kazakhstan	3–0	Thailand	25–20	25–21	25–20			75–61	Report

== Final round ==
Quarterfinals
27 September – Tehran
Iran	3
Sri Lanka	0
27 September – Tehran
South Korea	3
Japan	2
27 September – Tehran
Australia	3
Pakistan	1
27 September – Tehran
India	0
China	3

Semifinals
28 September – Tehran
Iran	3
South Korea	1
28 September – Tehran
Australia	2
China	3

Final
29 September – Tehran
Iran	3
China	1
3rd place
29 September – Tehran
South Korea	3
Australia	1

5th–8th places
28 September – Tehran
Sri Lanka	0
Japan	3
28 September – Tehran
Pakistan	1
India	3

5th place
29 September – Tehran
Japan	3
India	2
7th place
29 September – Tehran
Sri Lanka	0
Pakistan	3

=== Quarterfinals ===
Date	Time		Score		Set 1	Set 2	Set 3	Set 4	Set 5	Total	Report
27 Sep	10:00	Australia	3–1	Pakistan	25–16	25–23	22–25	25–15		97–79	Report
27 Sep	14:00	India	0–3	China	25–27	20–25	20–25			65–77	Report
27 Sep	16:00	South Korea	3–2	Japan	25–21	28–30	23–25	25–17	16–14	117–107	Report
27 Sep	18:30	Iran	3–0	Sri Lanka	25–16	25–18	25–15			75–49	Report

=== 5th–8th semifinals ===
Date	Time		Score		Set 1	Set 2	Set 3	Set 4	Set 5	Total	Report
28 Sep	10:00	Sri Lanka	0–3	Japan	18–25	18–25	20–25			56–75	Report
28 Sep	14:00	Pakistan	1–3	India	25–16	23–25	26–28	20–25		94–94	Report

=== Semifinals ===
Date	Time		Score		Set 1	Set 2	Set 3	Set 4	Set 5	Total	Report
28 Sep	16:00	Australia	2–3	China	20–25	23–25	25–20	25–22	11–15	104–107	Report
28 Sep	18:30	Iran	3–1	South Korea	21–25	25–23	25–14	25–20		96–82	Report

=== 7th place ===
Date	Time		Score		Set 1	Set 2	Set 3	Set 4	Set 5	Total	Report
29 Sep	09:00	Sri Lanka	0–3	Pakistan	15–25	22–25	23–25			60–75	Report

=== 5th place ===
Date	Time		Score		Set 1	Set 2	Set 3	Set 4	Set 5	Total	Report
29 Sep	11:00	Japan	3–2	India	23–25	18–25	25–17	25–22	21–19	112–108	Report

=== 3rd place ===
Date	Time		Score		Set 1	Set 2	Set 3	Set 4	Set 5	Total	Report
29 Sep	16:00	South Korea	3–1	Australia	25–22	16–25	26–24	25–20		92–91	Report

=== Final ===
Date	Time		Score		Set 1	Set 2	Set 3	Set 4	Set 5	Total	Report
29 Sep	18:30	Iran	3–1	China	22–25	25–18	25–19	25–16		97–78	Report

== Final standing ==
Rank	Team
1st place, gold medalist(s)	Iran
2nd place, silver medalist(s)	China
3rd place, bronze medalist(s)	South Korea
4	Australia
5	Japan
6	India
7	Pakistan
8	Sri Lanka
9	Kazakhstan
10	Thailand
11	Indonesia
12	Qatar
13	Chinese Taipei
14	Turkmenistan
15	Afghanistan
16	Uzbekistan

Qualified for the 2011 World Cup and 2012 World Olympic Qualifier 1
Qualified for the 2012 World Olympic Qualifier 1
Qualified for the 2012 World Olympic Qualifier 2 or 3
Already qualified as hosts for the 2011 World Cup and 2012 World Olympic Qualifier 1

2011 Asian Men's champions

Iran
1st title

Team Roster
Javad Mohammadinejad, Amir Hosseini, Mehdi Bazargard, Mohammad Mousavi, Hamzeh Zarini, Farhad Zarif, Alireza Nadi, Farhad Nazari Afshar, Mehdi Mahdavi, Arash Keshavarzi, Arash Kamalvand, Amir Ghafour
Head Coach: Julio Velasco

== Awards ==
- MVP: (Iran) Arash Kamalvand
- Best scorer: (South Korea) Jeon Kwang-in
- Best spiker: (Australia) Nathan Roberts
- Best blocker: (China) Liang Chunlong
- Best server: (South Korea) Kim Yo-han
- Best setter: (Iran) Amir Hosseini
- Best libero: (Iran) Farhad Zarif
