= Afghanistan men's national volleyball team =

National volleyball team

Afghanistan
- Association: Afghanistan National Volleyball Federation
- Confederation: AVC
- FIVB ranking: NR (5 October 2025)

Uniforms
Home	Away

Asian Championship
- Appearances: 3 (First in 2011)
- Best result: 14th (2023)

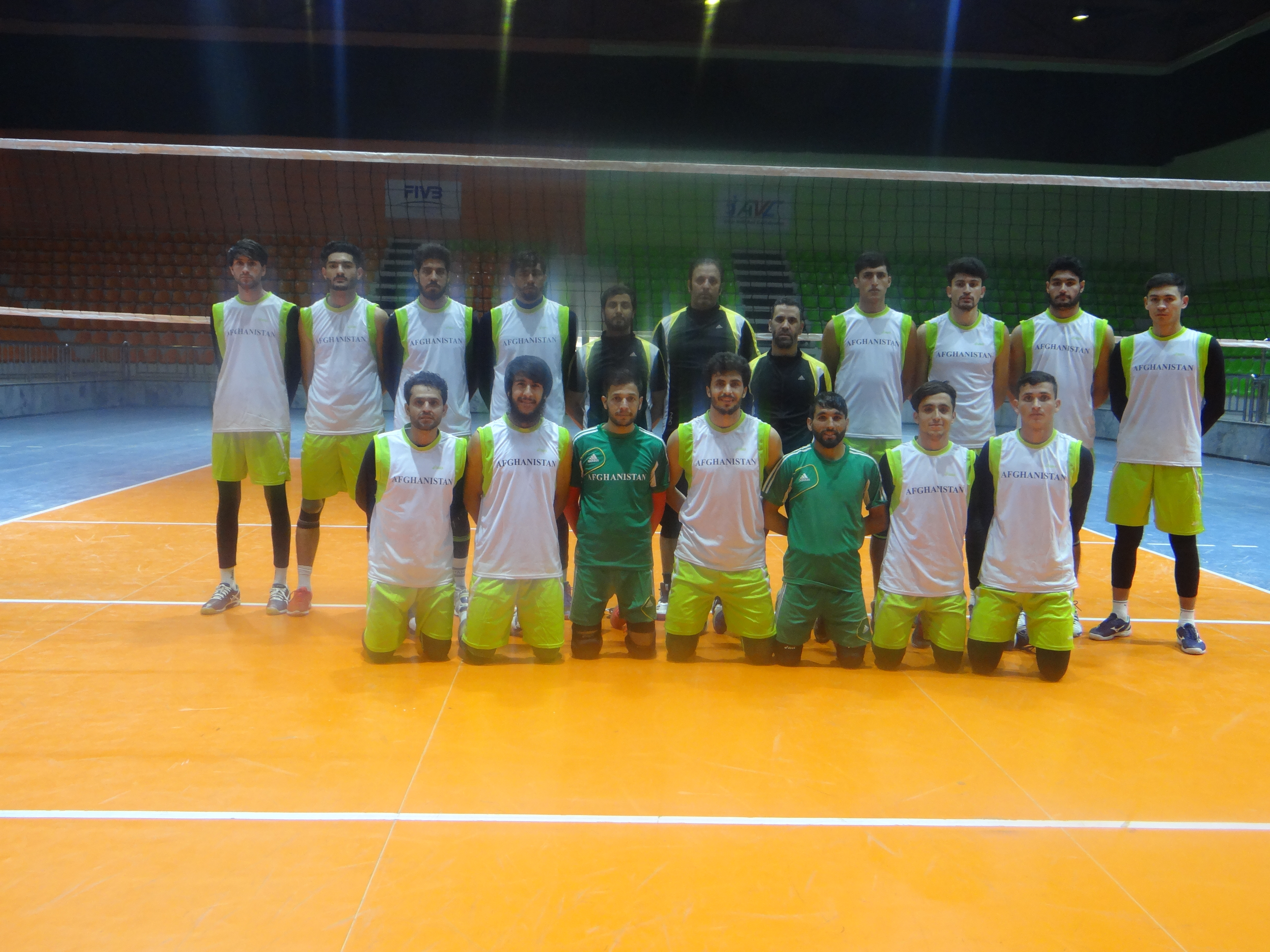

The Afghanistan men's national volleyball team represents Afghanistan in international volleyball competitions and friendly matches.

== Competitive record ==
=== Asian Championship ===
- (Iran) 2011 — 15th place
- (United Arab Emirates) 2013 — 20th place
- (Iran) 2023 — 14th place

=== Asian Games ===
- (China) 2022 — 17th place

=== CAVA Nations League ===
- (Pakistan) 2022 — 5th place
- (Pakistan) 2024 — 6th place

=== CAVA Challenge Cup ===
- (Sri Lanka) 2023 — (bronze) 3rd place
- (Uzbekistan) 2024 — 4th place

== Squad ==
Afghanistan national volleyball team 2022 The squad is made up of 14 players and 3 coaches and manager.

- Head coach: Mohammad Asadollahi Saraghein
- Assistant: Mohammad Sabir Noori
- Assistant: Nesar Ahmad Hanafi
- Team manager: Mohammad Nasir Noori
- Naseer Kohistani
- Gulam Rasool Haidari
- Ozair Mohammad Asefi
- Sayed Habib Yousufi
- Abdul Malik Mamoozai
- Lutfullah Azizi
- Shafiqullah Chaparhari
- Mohammad Sabawoon Wardak
- Mohammad Imran Niazai
- Besmallah Sultani
- Adil Shah Zakeeri
- Abdulmutaleb Mohammadi
- Abadullah Pacha
- Sabawoon Ghorzang

== Medals ==
Afghanistan has only one bronze medal in its history of volleyball, which it won from the Asians Men's Central Zone

2015 DHAKA, BANGLADESH

Afghanistan and Pakistan have faced each other in total of 19 volleyball matches. Afghanistan have won 12 whereas Pakistan have won 7.

Afghanistan and India have faced each other in total of 13 volleyball matches. Afghanistan have won 8 whereas India have won 5.

Afghanistan and Nepal have faced each other in total of 7 volleyball matches. Afghanistan have won 5 whereas Nepal have won 2.

Afghanistan and Bhutan have faced each other in total of 6 volleyball matches. Afghanistan have won 6 whereas Bhutan have won 0.

Afghanistan and Sri Lanka have faced each other in total of 11 volleyball matches. Afghanistan have won 8 whereas Sri Lanka have won 3.

Afghanistan and Bangladesh have faced each other in total of 17 volleyball matches. Afghanistan have won 12 whereas Bangladesh have won 5.
