= Uzbekistan men's national volleyball team =

National sports team

Uzbekistan
- Association: Uzbekistan Volleyball Federation
- Confederation: AVC
- Head coach: Karimjon Rakhimkulov
- FIVB ranking: 112 ▲15 (1 October 2026)

Uniforms
Home	Away

Asian Championship
- Appearances: 6 (First in 1997)
- Best result: 13th (2021)
Honours
Asian Challenge Cup
Bronze medal – third place	2022 Cholpon-Ata	Team

The Uzbekistan men's national volleyball team represents Uzbekistan in international volleyball competitions and friendly matches. The team is currently ranked 76th in the world.

== Records ==
=== Asian Championship ===
Year	Rank	M	W	L	SW	SL
(Australia) 1975	Part of Soviet Union					
(Bahrain) 1979	Part of Soviet Union					
(Japan) 1983	Part of Soviet Union					
(Kuwait) 1987	Part of Soviet Union					
(South Korea) 1989	Part of Soviet Union					
(Australia) 1991	Part of Soviet Union					
(Thailand) 1993	Did not enter					
(South Korea) 1995	Did not enter					
(Qatar) 1997	16/17	4	0	4	0	12
(Iran) 1999	Did not enter					
(South Korea) 2001	Did not enter					
(China) 2003	Did not enter					
(Thailand) 2005	16/18	6	1	5	6	17
(Indonesia) 2007	Did not enter					
(Philippines) 2009	Did not enter					
(Iran) 2011	16/16	7	0	7	3	21
(United Arab Emirates) 2013	16/21	6	0	6	3	18
(Iran) 2015	Did not enter					
(Indonesia) 2017	Did not enter					
(Iran) 2019	Did not enter					
(Japan) 2021	13/16	7	2	5	7	17
(Iran) 2023	17/17	3	0	3	1	9
Total	6/22	33	3	30	20	94

=== Asian Challenge Cup ===
Year	Rank	M	W	L	SW	SL
(Sri Lanka) 2018	Did not enter					
(Kyrgyzstan) 2022	3/4	5	1	4	8	14
(Taiwan) 2023	Did not enter					
(Bahrain) 2024	Did not enter					
Total	1/4	5	1	4	8	14

=== CAVA Nations League ===
- (Kyrgyzstan) 2023 — 4th place
- (Uzbekistan) 2025 — 7th place

=== CAVA Challenge Cup ===
- (Sri Lanka) 2023 — (silver) Runners-up
- (Uzbekistan) 2024 — (silver) Runners-up
