= Sri Lanka men's national volleyball team =

National sports team

Sri Lanka
- Association: Sri Lanka Volleyball Federation
- Confederation: AVC
- Head coach: (Sri Lanka) Channa Jayasekara
- FIVB ranking: 90 ▲5 (1 October 2026)

Uniforms
Home	Away

Asian Championship
- Appearances: 12 (First in 1989)
- Best result: 8th (2011)
Honours
Asian Challenge Cup
Bronze medal – third place	2018 Colombo	Team

The Sri Lanka men's national volleyball team represents Sri Lanka in international volleyball competitions and friendly matches, governed by Sri Lanka Volleyball Federation (SLVF).

== Competition history ==
=== Asian Championship ===
Year	Result	Pld	W	L	SW	SL	PW	PL
(Australia) 1975	Did not participate	0	0	0	0	0	0	0
(Bahrain) 1979	Did not participate	0	0	0	0	0	0	0
(Japan) 1983	Did not participate	0	0	0	0	0	0	0
(Kuwait) 1987	Did not participate	0	0	0	0	0	0	0
(South Korea) 1989	13th place	0	0	0	0	0	0	0
(Australia) 1991	Did not participate	0	0	0	0	0	0	0
(Thailand) 1993	13th place	0	0	0	0	0	0	0
(South Korea) 1995	9th place	0	0	0	0	0	0	0
(Qatar) 1997	15th place	0	0	0	0	0	0	0
(Iran) 1999	12th place	0	0	0	0	0	0	0
(South Korea) 2001	Did not participate	0	0	0	0	0	0	0
(China) 2003	Did not participate	0	0	0	0	0	0	0
(Thailand) 2005	Did not participate	0	0	0	0	0	0	0
(Indonesia) 2007	14th place	0	0	0	0	0	0	0
(Philippines) 2009	16th place	0	0	0	0	0	0	0
(Iran) 2011	8th place	0	0	0	0	0	0	0
(United Arab Emirates) 2013	15th place	0	0	0	0	0	0	0
(Iran) 2015	13th place	0	0	0	0	0	0	0
(Indonesia) 2017	14th place	0	0	0	0	0	0	0
(Iran) 2019	14th place	7	3	4	11	14	548	593
Total	0/19	0	0	0	0	0	0	0

=== Asian Games ===
Year	Result	Pld	W	L	SW	SL	PW	PL
(Japan) 1958	Did not participate	0	0	0	0	0	0	0
(Indonesia) 1962	Did not participate	0	0	0	0	0	0	0
(Thailand) 1966	11th place	0	0	0	0	0	0	0
(Thailand) 1970	Did not participate	0	0	0	0	0	0	0
(Iran) 1974	Did not participate	0	0	0	0	0	0	0
(Thailand) 1978	Did not participate	0	0	0	0	0	0	0
(India) 1982	Did not participate	0	0	0	0	0	0	0
(South Korea) 1986	Did not participate	0	0	0	0	0	0	0
(China) 1990	Did not participate	0	0	0	0	0	0	0
(Japan) 1994	Did not participate	0	0	0	0	0	0	0
(Thailand) 1998	Did not participate	0	0	0	0	0	0	0
(South Korea) 2002	Did not participate	0	0	0	0	0	0	0
(Qatar) 2006	Did not participate	0	0	0	0	0	0	0
(China) 2010	Did not participate	0	0	0	0	0	0	0
(South Korea) 2014	Did not participate	0	0	0	0	0	0	0
(Indonesia) 2018	13th place	0	0	0	0	0	0	0
Total	0/16	0	0	0	0	0	0	0

=== Asian Challenge Cup ===
Year	Result	Pld	W	L	SW	SL
(Sri Lanka) 2018	(bronze) 3rd place	6	4	2	14	6
(Kyrgyzstan) 2022	Did not participate					
(Taiwan) 2023	13th place	4	2	2	8	6
(Bahrain) 2024	Did not participate					
Total	2/4	10	6	4	22	12

=== CAVA Nations League ===
- (Pakistan) 2022 — 4th place
- (Pakistan) 2024 — 4th place

=== CAVA Challenge Cup ===
- (Sri Lanka) 2023 — (gold) Champions

== Current squad ==
- Ayesh Dilshan - captain
- G. Tilakraj
- Akidu Sathsara
- Lahiru Madhuwantha
- Charitha Udayanga
- Manjula Naleen
- Shashi Lakshan
- Wasantha Lakmal
- Lasindu Methmal
- Deepthi Romesh
- Nalin Sanjeewa
- Dulanjan Sandeepa
- Mehomad Tahir
- Vimukthi Sagara
  - Kalika Wasanthapriya - head coach
  - Shamil Malinda - trainer
  - Mahinda Bandara - Assistant and vice president
  - Milroy Thissera - Assistant coach
  - Tenuka Malinda - Team manager

Updated with CAVA Nations Cup 2025 details
