= 2022 Indonesian men's Proliga =

2022 PLN Mobile Pro Liga (men's)
- Association: PBVSI
- League: Proliga
- Sport: Volleyball
- Duration: 7 January - 27 March 2022
- Games: 66
- Teams: 6
- Total attendance: Attendees prohibited
- TV partners: O Channel; Champions TV; Usee Sports; Vidio

Regular season
- Top seed: Jakarta Pertamina Pertamax
- Top scorer: (Indonesia) Sandy Akbar

Finals
- Champions: Bogor LavAni
- Runners-up: Surabaya Bhayangkara Samator
- Finals MVP: (Indonesia) Doni Haryono

Indonesian men's Proliga seasons
- 2019; ~~2020~~; ~~2021~~ 2023

The 2022 Indonesian men's Proliga (or 2022 PLN Mobile Proliga for sponsorship reasons) is the 20th volleyball tournament year and the 18th top level volleyball season of the men's Proliga. It was held from January 7 to March 27, 2022. This season's Proliga was held with implementing strict health protocols and no attendance, due to the COVID-19 pandemic in Indonesia.

== Location and schedule ==
Locations of 2022 men's Proliga season
Red: men's clubs; Blue: league venue

Phase	Round	Date	Arena
First phase	Week I	7-9 January 2022	Pol. Gen. Kunarto Volleyball Camp, Bogor
First phase	Week II	14-16 January 2022	Pol. Gen. Kunarto Volleyball Camp, Bogor
First phase	Week III	21-23 January 2022	Pol. Gen. Kunarto Volleyball Camp, Bogor
First phase	Week IV	28-30 January 2022	Pol. Gen. Kunarto Volleyball Camp, Bogor
Second phase	Week V	11-13 February 2021	Pol. Gen. Kunarto Volleyball Camp, Bogor
Second phase	Week VI	18-20 February 2021	Pol. Gen. Kunarto Volleyball Camp, Bogor
Second phase	Week VII	25-27 February 2021	Pol. Gen. Kunarto Volleyball Camp, Bogor
Second phase	Week VIII	4-6 March 2021	Pol. Gen. Kunarto Volleyball Camp, Bogor

== Teams ==
=== Personnel and kits ===
Teams	Head coach	Captain	Kit manufacturer
Bogor LavAni	(China) Jiang Jie	(Indonesia) Dio Zulfikri	(Indonesia) FourA
Jakarta BNI 46	(Indonesia) Samsul Jais	(Indonesia) Mahendra Rikha Buana	(Indonesia) Speed
Jakarta Pertamina Pertamax	(Indonesia) Pascal Wilmar	(Indonesia) Jasen Nathanael Kilanta	(Indonesia) In-house
Kudus Sukun Badak	(Indonesia) Rohaldi Mulyo	(Indonesia) Aji Maulana	(Indonesia) Bharata
Palembang Bank Sumsel Babel	(Indonesia) Putut Marhaento	(Indonesia) Gunawan Saputra	(Indonesia) Bharata
Surabaya Bhayangkara Samator	(Indonesia) Sigit Ari Widodo	(Indonesia) Nizar Julfikar	(Japan) Mizuno

=== Foreign players ===
Teams	Player 1	Player 2
Bogor LavAni	(Brazil) Leandro Martin da Silva	(Cuba) Jorge González García
Jakarta BNI 46	(Japan) Takahiro Tozaki	(Cuba) Osmany Camejo Durruthy
Jakarta Pertamina Pertamax	(Brazil) Luiz Perotto	(Russia) Nikita Venediktov
Kudus Sukun Badak	(Brazil) Douglas Bueno	(Uzbekistan) Islomjon Sobirov
Palembang Bank Sumsel Babel	(Brazil) Caio Oliveira	(Brazil) Sérgio Luiz Felix Júnior
Surabaya Bhayangkara Samator	(Australia) Tim Robert Taylor	(Serbia) Marko Sindjelic

== Regular season ==
Pos	Team	Pld	W	L	Pts	SW	SL	SR	SPW	SPL	SPR	Qualification
1	Jakarta Pertamina Pertamax	10	8	2	23	24	12	2.000	833	770	1.082	Advanced to the playoffs
2	Jakarta BNI 46	10	7	3	19	23	15	1.533	874	834	1.048	Advanced to the playoffs
3	Bogor LavAni	10	6	4	20	24	16	1.500	937	852	1.100	Advanced to the playoffs
4	Surabaya Bhayangkara Samator	10	5	5	16	20	20	1.000	915	929	0.985	Advanced to the playoffs
5	Kudus Sukun Badak	10	2	8	7	13	26	0.500	808	911	0.887	
6	Palembang Bank Sumsel Babel	10	2	8	5	13	28	0.464	877	951	0.922	

Source: proliga.co.id

== Final rounds ==
=== League table ===
Pos	Team	Pld	W	L	Pts	SW	SL	SR	SPW	SPL	SPR	Qualification
1	Surabaya Bhayangkara Samator	3	3	0	8	9	3	3.000	286	266	1.075	Final
2	Bogor LavAni	3	2	1	7	8	3	2.667	260	218	1.193	Final
3	Jakarta BNI 46	3	1	2	3	4	7	0.571	235	264	0.890	3rd place match
4	Jakarta Pertamina Pertamax	1	0	1	0	1	9	0.111	216	249	0.867	3rd place match

Source: proliga.co.id

=== 3rd place match ===
Date	Time		Score		Set 1	Set 2	Set 3	Set 4	Set 5	Total	Report
27 Mar	16:00	Jakarta BNI 46	3–1	Jakarta Pertamina Pertamax	25–23	25–23	22–25	25–23		97–94	M65

=== Final ===
Date	Time		Score		Set 1	Set 2	Set 3	Set 4	Set 5	Total	Report
27 Mar	19:00	Surabaya Bhayangkara Samator	2–3	Bogor LavAni	27–25	19–25	25–20	18–25	10–15	99–110	M66

== Final standings ==
Rank	Team
1st place, gold medalist(s)	Bogor LavAni
2nd place, silver medalist(s)	Surabaya Bhayangkara Samator
3rd place, bronze medalist(s)	Jakarta BNI 46
4	Jakarta Pertamina Pertamax
5	Kudus Sukun Badak
6	Palembang Bank Sumsel Babel

Qualified for the 2022 Asian Club Championship
Qualified for the 2022 Southeast Asian V. League

2022 men's Proliga Champions

First title

18–man roster
Dio Zulfikri, Reihan AF, Aqro M.Reza, M. Malizi, Hendra Kurniawan, Daffa Naufal M, Zulian F. Prabowo, Jorge Gonzales Garcia, Doni Haryono, Musabikhan, Boy Arnes Arabi, Prasojo, nanda Waliyu Ramadhani, Leonardo Martins Da Silva, Dzikry Ilhamsyah, Beni Haryono, Irpan, Dafa Wardana
Head coach
Nicolas Vives

== Awards ==
- Most valuable player
  (Indonesia) Doni Haryono (Bogor LavAni)
- Best coach
  (China) Jiang Jie (Bogor LavAni)
- Best scorer
  (Cuba) Camejo Durruthy Osmany (Jakarta BNI 46)
- Best libero
  (Indonesia) Irpan (Bogor LavAni)
- Best setter
  (Indonesia) Nizar Julfikar (Surabaya Bhayangkara Samator)
- Best blocker
  (Cuba) Camejo Durruthy Osmany (Jakarta BNI 46)
- Best spiker
  (Cuba) Jorge Gonzales Garcia (Bogor LavAni)
- Best server
  (Indonesia) Farhan Halim (Jakarta Pertamina Pertamax)
