= 2019 Indonesian men's Proliga =

2019 Pro Liga (men's)
- Association: PBVSI
- League: Proliga
- Sport: Volleyball
- Duration: 8 December 2018 - 24 February 2019
- Games: 44
- Teams: 6
- Total attendance: -
- TV partners: iNews; Usee TV

Regular season
- Season champions: Jakarta Pertamina Energi
- Top seed: Surabaya Bhayangkara Samator
- MVP: Rendy Tamamilang

Finals
- Champions: Surabaya Bhayangkara Samator
- Runners-up: Jakarta BNI 46

Indonesian men's Proliga seasons
- 2018 2022

The 2019 Indonesian men's Proliga is the 18th season of Indonesian men's Proliga. The season started on 8 December 2018 and concluded on 23 February 2019.

This season's Proliga was held in eight cities, Yogyakarta, Gresik, Bandung, Palembang, Pekanbaru, Surakarta, Kediri and Malang.

== Teams ==
Teams	Cities	Arena	Head coach	Captain	Musim 2018	Sponsor
Jakarta BNI 46	Jakarta	GOR Sritex Arena, Surakarta	(Indonesia) Samsul Jais	(Indonesia) Aji Maulana	4th final four	Bank Negara Indonesia
Jakarta Garuda	Jakarta	GOR Tri Dharma, Gresik	(Indonesia) Eko Waluyo	(Indonesia) Mahendra Rikha Buana	-	Petrokimia Gresik
Jakarta Pertamina Energi	Jakarta	GOR Among Rogo, Yogyakarta	(Indonesia) Putut Marhaento	(Indonesia) Agung Seganti	3rd final four	Pertamina
Palembang Bank Sumsel Babel	Palembang, Sumatra Selatan	Gedung PSCC, Palembang	(Indonesia) Pascal Wilmar	(Indonesia) Bagus Wahyu Ardinto	Runner-up	Bank Sumsel Babel
Sidoarjo Aneka Gas Industri	Sidoarjo, Jawa Timur	-	(Indonesia) Joni Sugiyatno	(Indonesia) Ibnu Qurniadi	-	Aneka Gas Industri
Surabaya Bhayangkara Samator	Surabaya, Jawa Timur	Gelanggang Remaja Pekanbaru, Pekanbaru	(Indonesia) Ibarsyah Djanur Tjahjono	(Indonesia) Rendy Tamamilang	Champions	POLRI; Sukun Group; Samator

== Location and schedule ==
Locations of 2019 men's Proliga season
Red: First phase dan final Yellow: Final four Green: First phase Blue: Second phase

Phase	Date	Arena
First phase	7–9 December 2018	GOR Among Rogo, Yogyakarta
First phase	14–16 December 2018	GOR Tridharma, Gresik
First phase	21–23 December 2018	GOR C-Tra Arena, Bandung
Second phase	11–13 January 2019	Gedung PSCC, Palembang
Second phase	18–20 January 2019	Gelanggang Remaja Pekanbaru, Pekanbaru
Second phase	25–27 January 2019	GOR Sritex Arena, Surakarta
Final four	8–10 February 2019	GOR Jayabaya, Kediri
Final four	15–17 February 2019	GOR Ken Arok, Malang
Final	23–24 February 2019	GOR Among Rogo, Yogyakarta

== Final rounds ==
=== League table ===
Pos	Team	Pld	W	L	Pts	SW	SL	SR	SPW	SPL	SPR	Qualification
1	Jakarta BNI 46	6	5	1	15	15	7	2.143	526	485	1.085	Final
2	Surabaya Bhayangkara Samator	6	3	3	11	11	9	1.222	446	461	0.967	Final
3	Palembang Bank Sumsel Babel	6	2	4	7	9	13	0.692	506	501	1.010	3rd place match
4	Jakarta Pertamina Energi	6	2	4	7	6	12	0.500	403	434	0.929	3rd place match

Source: proliga.co.id

=== 3rd place match ===
Date	Time		Score		Set 1	Set 2	Set 3	Set 4	Set 5	Total	Report
24 Feb	13:00	Palembang Bank Sumsel Babel	1–3	Jakarta Pertamina Energi	25–23	26–28	21–25	17–25		89–101	B34

=== Final ===
Date	Time		Score		Set 1	Set 2	Set 3	Set 4	Set 5	Total	Report
24 Feb	16:00	Jakarta BNI 46	1–3	Surabaya Bhayangkara Samator	25–23	20–25	24–26	17–25		86–99	B34

== Final standings ==
Rank	Team
1st place, gold medalist(s)	Surabaya Bhayangkara Samator
2nd place, silver medalist(s)	Jakarta BNI 46
3rd place, bronze medalist(s)	Jakarta Pertamina Energi
4	Palembang Bank Sumsel Babel
5	Sidoarjo Aneka Gas Industri
6	Jakarta Garuda

2019 men's Proliga Champions

7th title

== Awards ==
- Most valuable player
  (Indonesia) Rendy Tamamilang (Surabaya Bhayangkara Samator)
- Best coach
  (Indonesia) Ibarsjah Djanu Tjahjono (Surabaya Bhayangkara Samator)
- Best scorer
  (Indonesia) Sigit Ardian (Jakarta BNI 46)
- Best libero
  (Indonesia) Veleg Dhani Ristan (Jakarta BNI 46)
- Best setter
  (Indonesia) Dio Zulfikri (Jakarta BNI 46)
- Best blocker
  (Cuba) Osmel Camejo Durruthi (Jakarta BNI 46)
- Best spiker
  (Montenegro) Aleksander Minic (Jakarta Pertamina Energi)
- Best server
  (Cuba) Alfredo Zequeira Cairo (Palembang Bank Sumsel Babel)
