= 2023 Indonesian men's Proliga =

Indonesian volleyball league

- Association: Indonesian Volleyball Federation
- League: Proliga
- Sport: Volleyball
- Duration: 5 January – 19 March 2023
- Games: 70
- Teams: 8
- TV partners: Moji; Champions TV 3; Nex Parabola; MNC Sports 3; Usee Sports 2; Vidio

Regular season
- Top seed: Jakarta LavAni Allo Bank
- Top scorer: Rivan Nurmulki

Finals
- Champions: Jakarta LavAni Allo Bank
- Runners-up: Jakarta Bhayangkara Presisi
- Finals MVP: Fahry Septian

Indonesian men's Proliga seasons
- 2022 2024

The 2023 Indonesian men's Proliga (or 2023 PLN Mobile Proliga for sponsorship reasons) was the 21st season of Indonesian men's Proliga, The Indonesian professional volleyball league organized by the Indonesian Volleyball Federation since 2002. The season started on 5 January 2023 and concluded on 19 March 2023.

This season was composed of eight teams, including the two new teams — Jakarta Bhayangkara Presisi and Jakarta STIN BIN.

Jakarta LavAni Allo Bank won their second title in two consecutive seasons, after defeating Jakarta Bhayangkara Presisi in five sets in the final.

== Teams ==
=== Personnel ===
2023 Indonesian men's Proliga
Club		Head coach	Captain	Colors	Main sponsor
JBP	Jakarta Bhayangkara Presisi	(Cuba) Toiran Reidel	(Indonesia) Nizar Julfikar		Bank Rakyat Indonesia, Aqua
BNI	Jakarta BNI 46	(Indonesia) Walfidrus Wahyu	(Indonesia) I Kadek Juliadi		Bank Negara Indonesia
LAV	Jakarta LavAni Allo Bank	(Cuba) Nicolas Vives	(Indonesia) Dio Zulfikri		Allo Bank
JPX	Jakarta Pertamina Pertamax	(Indonesia) Putut Marheanto	(Montenegro) Aleksandar Minić		Pertamina
BIN	Jakarta STIN BIN	(Brazil) Alessandro Ferreira	(Indonesia) Farhan Halim		BIN, Gondola Resto & Lounge
KSB	Kudus Sukun Badak	(Indonesia) Ibarsjah Djanu	(Indonesia) Aji Maulana		Sukun Cigarette Factory
PBS	Palembang Bank Sumsel Babel	(South Korea) Lee Young-taek	(Indonesia) Gunawan Saputra		Bank Sumsel Babel
SBS	Surabaya BIN Samator	(Iran) Ahmad Masajedi	(Indonesia) Rivan Nurmulki		BIN, Samator Indo Gas

=== Foreign players ===
In the 2023 Proliga, each team must sign one foreign player and a maximum of two foreign players. In the second leg of the regular season, each team is allowed to replace one foreign player.

2023 Indonesian men's Proliga foreign players
Club	Player 1	Player 2
Jakarta Bhayangkara Presisi	(United States) Garrett Muagututia	(Uganda) Daudi Okello
Jakarta BNI 46	(United States) Samuel Holt	(Serbia) Petar Premović
Jakarta LavAni Allo Bank	(Brazil) Leandro Martins	(Cuba) Jorge García
Jakarta Pertamina Pertamax	(Montenegro) Aleksandar Minić	~~(Colombia) Leiner Aponza~~ (Cuba) Yoendri Kindelan
Jakarta STIN BIN	(Brazil) Isac Santos	(Bulgaria) Rozalin Penchev
Kudus Sukun Badak	(Australia) Hamish Hazelden	~~(Brazil) Gabriel Molina~~ (Canada) Jared Jarvis
Palembang Bank Sumsel Babel	(South Korea) Song Jun-ho	(Mali) (Serbia) Solimou Souaré
Surabaya BIN Samator	(Benin) Daouda Yacoubou	(Brazil) Paulo Lamounier

== Schedule and venues ==
The 2023 Indonesian men's Proliga took place in eight cities. The regular season was held from 5 January to 19 February 2023 and took place in six cities, Bandung, Purwokerto, Palembang, Gresik, Malang and Yogyakarta.

The final round, held from 23 February to 19 March 2023, took place in four cities, Gresik, Semarang, Solo and Yogyakarta. The following are the schedule and venues for the 2023 Indonesian men's Proliga.

=== Regular season ===
Leg 1

- Week 1 (January 5–8)
  - Sabilulungan Jalak Harupat Sports Hall, Bandung, West Java
- Week 2 (January 12–15)
  - Satria Sports Hall, Purwokerto, Central Java
- Week 3 (January 19–22)
  - Palembang Sport and Convention Center, Palembang, South Sumatra

Leg 2

- Week 4 (February 2–5)
  - Tri Dharma Sports Hall, Gresik, East Java
- Week 5 (February 9–12)
  - Ken Arok Sports Center, Malang, East Java
- Week 6 (February 16–19)
  - UNY Sports Hall, Yogyakarta, Special Region of Yogyakarta

=== Final round ===
Semifinals

- Week 7 (February 23–26)
  - Tri Dharma Sports Hall, Gresik, East Java
- Week 8 (March 2–5)
  - Jatidiri Sports Complex, Semarang, Central Java
- Week 9 (March 9–12)
  - Sritex Arena Sports Hall, Solo, Central Java

3rd place & Final

- Week 10 (March 19)
  - Among Rogo Sports Hall, Yogyakarta, Special Region of Yogyakarta

== Squads ==
Under the current season rules, each team involved in the tournament is required to register a maximum of 16 rosters including 2 foreign players.

=== Jakarta Bhayangkara Presisi ===
The following is Jakarta Bhayangkara Presisi's roster in the 2023 Indonesian men's Proliga.

Head coach: (Cuba) Toiran Reidel

- 1 (Indonesia) Frisca Abriantama OP
- 2 (Indonesia) Arjuna Mahendra OH
- 3 (Indonesia) Jovan Al Lathief OH
- 4 (Uganda) Daudi Okello OP
- 5 (Indonesia) Raden Ahmad Gumilar MB
- 6 (Indonesia) Mohamad Sadam OH
- 7 (Indonesia) Alfin Daniel S
- 8 (Indonesia) Nizar Julfikar S
- 9 (Indonesia) Yuda Mardiansyah MB
- 10 (Indonesia) Vaisal Faris MB
- 11 (Indonesia) Rendy Verdian Licardo OP
- 13 (Indonesia) Hernanda Zulfi MB
- 14 (Indonesia) Henry Ade Novian L
- 17 (Indonesia) Rendy Tamamilang OH
- 18 (United States) Garrett Muagututia OH
- 19 (Indonesia) Fahreza Rakha L

=== Jakarta BNI 46 ===
The following is Jakarta BNI 46's roster in the 2023 Indonesian men's Proliga.

Head coach: (Indonesia) Walfidrus Wahyu

- 2 (Indonesia) Ilham Akbar OH
- 3 (Indonesia) Sigit Ardian OH
- 6 (Indonesia) Imam Ahmad Faisal OP
- 7 (Indonesia) Kaula Nurhidayat OP
- 8 (Indonesia) Dhani Anggriawan MB
- 9 (Indonesia) Achmad Rizal OH
- 11 (Indonesia) Ade Candra Rachmawan OH
- 12 (Indonesia) Risky Ramadan MB
- 13 (Indonesia) I Kadek Juliadi S
- 15 (Indonesia) Faisal Ashar Arafli MB
- 16 (Indonesia) Muhamad Kadavi L
- 17 (Indonesia) Cahya Wismoyojati S
- 18 (Indonesia) Rian Irawan MB
- 20 (Serbia) Petar Premović OP
- 21 (United States) Samuel Holt OH
- 99 (Indonesia) Veleg Dhany Ristan L

=== Jakarta LavAni Allo Bank ===
The following is Jakarta LavAni Allo Bank's roster in the 2023 Indonesian men's Proliga.

Head coach: (Cuba) Nicolas Vives

- 1 (Indonesia) Daffa Naufal MB
- 2 (Indonesia) Yohanes Dedi OH
- 3 (Indonesia) Boy Arnes OH
- 4 (Indonesia) Hendra Kurniawan MB
- 5 (Indonesia) Musabikhan OH
- 6 (Brazil) Leandro Martins OP
- 7 (Indonesia) Elvin Fajar MB
- 8 (Indonesia) Prasojo OP
- 9 (Indonesia) Jordan Susanto OH
- 10 (Indonesia) Fahry Septian OH
- 11 (Indonesia) Muhammad Malizi MB
- 12 (Indonesia) Irpan L
- 15 (Indonesia) Dio Zulfikri S
- 16 (Indonesia) Reihan Andiko S
- 17 (Cuba) Jorge García OH
- 20 (Indonesia) Nanda Waliyu OH

=== Jakarta Pertamina Pertamax ===
The following is Jakarta Pertamina Pertamax's roster in the 2023 Indonesian men's Proliga.

Head coach: (Indonesia) Putut Marheanto

- 1 (Montenegro) Aleksandar Minić OP
- 2 (Indonesia) Yogi Kurniawan MB
- 3 (Indonesia) Antho Bertiyawan MB
- 4 (Cuba) Yoendri Kindelan OH
- 5 (Indonesia) Febrian Adhe S
- 6 (Indonesia) Fadilla Rahmatullah S
- 9 (Indonesia) Edy Kumara OH
- 10 (Indonesia) I Nyoman Julianta OH
- 11 (Indonesia) I Made Vandim MB
- 12 (Indonesia) Ryno Viagustama OH
- 13 (Indonesia) Vilar Juni Hilal L
- 14 (Indonesia) Ogi Alexander OP
- 15 (Indonesia) Delly Heryanto
- 17 (Indonesia) I Made Adhi Suartama S
- 18 (Indonesia) Robbi Rimbawan MB
- 21 (Indonesia) Luvi Febrian OH

=== Jakarta STIN BIN ===
The following is Jakarta STIN BIN's roster in the 2023 Indonesian men's Proliga.

Head coach: (Brazil) Alessandro Ferreira

- 3 (Indonesia) Fauzan Nibras OP
- 4 (Indonesia) Bintang Saputra OH
- 5 (Indonesia) Bagus Wahyu Ardianto S
- 6 (Bulgaria) Rozalin Penchev OH
- 7 (Indonesia) Andre Krisdiantono OH
- 8 (Indonesia) Jasen Natanael S
- 9 (Indonesia) Farhan Halim OH
- 11 (Indonesia) Dimas Saputra OP
- 12 (Brazil) Isac Santos MB
- 13 (Indonesia) Muhamad Ridwan L
- 14 (Indonesia) Stephanus Ardian OH
- 15 (Indonesia) Fikri Mustofa OP
- 17 (Indonesia) Ujang Nandar MB
- 18 (Indonesia) Yayan Riyanto MB
- 20 (Indonesia) Sunanda Abdillah L
- 21 (Indonesia) Cep Indra Agustin MB

=== Kudus Sukun Badak ===
The following is Kudus Sukun Badak's roster in the 2023 Indonesian men's Proliga.

Head coach: (Indonesia) Ibarsjah Djanu

- 1 (Indonesia) Made Harin OH
- 2 (Indonesia) Viko Zulfan S
- 3 (Indonesia) Adik Tri Yuliyanto MB
- 4 (Indonesia) Sapta Rafi Sanjaya OP
- 6 (Indonesia) Muhammad Saiful Anwar L
- 7 (Australia) Hamish Hazelden OP
- 8 (Indonesia) Rifki Ferdianto OP
- 10 (Indonesia) Muhammad Adnan Al'ihza S
- 11 (Indonesia) Agung Seganti OH
- 12 (Indonesia) Louis Ardian OH
- 13 (Indonesia) Mochamad Syahril Amri MB
- 15 (Indonesia) Dimas Setiawan MB
- 16 (Indonesia) Bastian Tamtomo L
- 17 (Indonesia) Aji Maulana S
- 18 (Indonesia) Rahmat Kurniadi MB
- 24 (Canada) Jared Jarvis OH

=== Palembang Bank Sumsel Babel ===
The following is Palembang Bank Sumsel Babel's roster in the 2023 Indonesian men's Proliga.

Head coach: (South Korea) Lee Young-taek

- 1 (Indonesia) Gani Loveano S
- 2 (Indonesia) Adi Putra Firmansyah MB
- 3 (Indonesia) Muhammad Teguh S
- 4 (Indonesia) Mahfud Nurcahyadi MB
- 6 (Indonesia) Febriyanto OH
- 7 (Indonesia) Samsul Kohar OP
- 8 (South Korea) Song Jun-ho OH
- 9 (Indonesia) Sandy Akbar OH
- 10 (Indonesia) Roy Satrio Fernando L
- 11 (Mali) (Serbia) Solimou Souaré OP
- 12 (Indonesia) Denie Arya Wicaksana MB
- 13 (Indonesia) Dio Panji Rahmadi OH
- 14 (Indonesia) Muhamad Syaifudin Najib L
- 15 (Indonesia) Andi Purnomo L
- 17 (Indonesia) Gunawan Saputra MB
- 19 (Indonesia) Hayun Muhammad OH

=== Surabaya BIN Samator ===
The following is Surabaya BIN Samator's roster in the 2023 Indonesian men's Proliga.

Head coach: (Iran) Ahmad Masajedi

- 1 (Benin) Daouda Yacoubou OH
- 2 (Brazil) Paulo Lamounier S
- 3 (Indonesia) Galih Bayu Saputra OH
- 4 (Indonesia) Tedi Oka Syahputra MB
- 5 (Indonesia) Ega Yuri Pradana MB
- 6 (Indonesia) Hadi Suharto MB
- 7 (Indonesia) Rama Fazza Fauzan OP
- 8 (Indonesia) Bagas Farhan S
- 10 (Indonesia) Ageng Wardoyo L
- 12 (Indonesia) Rivan Nurmulki OP
- 13 (Indonesia) Richi Rizky MB
- 14 (Indonesia) Yoga Prastyo OH
- 15 (Indonesia) Hendrik Agel L
- 16 (Indonesia) Devan Rizky S
- 17 (Indonesia) Agil Anggara OH
- 18 (Indonesia) I Putu Randu MB

== Pool standing procedure ==
1. Total number of victories (matches won, matches lost)
2. In the event of a tie, the following first tiebreaker will apply: The teams will be ranked by the most points gained per match as follows:
  - Match won 3–0 or 3–1: 3 points for the winner, 0 points for the loser
  - Match won 3–2: 2 points for the winner, 1 point for the loser
  - Match forfeited: 3 points for the winner, 0 points (0–25, 0–25, 0–25) for the loser
3. If teams are still tied after examining the number of victories and points gained, then the PBVSI will examine the results in order to break the tie in the following order:
  - Sets quotient: if two or more teams are tied on the number of points gained, they will be ranked by the quotient resulting from the division of the number of all sets won by the number of all sets lost.
  - Points quotient: if the tie persists based on the sets quotient, the teams will be ranked by the quotient resulting from the division of all points scored by the total of points lost during all sets.
  - If the tie persists based on the points quotient, the tie will be broken based on the team that won the match of the Round Robin Phase between the tied teams. When the tie in points quotient is between three or more teams, these teams ranked taking into consideration only the matches involving the teams in question.

== Regular season ==
- Eight teams play two legs with a double round robin system.
- The top four ranked teams advance to the final round.
- All times are local, WIB (UTC+07:00).

=== League table ===
Pos	Team	Pld	W	L	Pts	SW	SL	SR	SPW	SPL	SPR	Qualification
1	Jakarta LavAni Allo Bank	14	13	1	38	41	9	4.556	1222	1038	1.177	Final round
2	Jakarta STIN BIN	14	11	3	33	36	15	2.400	1208	1095	1.103	Final round
3	Jakarta Bhayangkara Presisi	14	11	3	31	34	17	2.000	1210	1125	1.076	Final round
4	Surabaya BIN Samator	14	7	7	22	27	24	1.125	1163	1157	1.005	Final round
5	Jakarta BNI 46	14	5	9	17	21	29	0.724	1045	1053	0.992	
6	Jakarta Pertamina Pertamax	14	4	10	13	18	33	0.545	1191	1262	0.944	
7	Palembang Bank Sumsel Babel	14	4	10	10	16	37	0.432	1110	1254	0.885	
8	Kudus Sukun Badak	14	1	13	4	10	39	0.256	1030	1197	0.860	

=== Fixtures and results ===
==== Leg 1 ====
Date	Time		Score		Set 1	Set 2	Set 3	Set 4	Set 5	Total	Report
Week 1 — Bandung
5 Jan	14:00	Jakarta BNI 46	0–3	Jakarta LavAni Allo Bank	20–25	23–25	20–25			63–75	Report
5 Jan	16:00	Surabaya BIN Samator	2–3	Palembang Bank Sumsel Babel	25–16	23–25	17–25	25–21	17–19	107–106	Report
5 Jan	18:30	Jakarta STIN BIN	3–1	Kudus Sukun Badak	25–22	25–19	21–25	25–20		96–86	Report
6 Jan	16:00	Jakarta Pertamina Pertamax	0–3	Jakarta LavAni Allo Bank	14–25	25–27	24–26			63–78	Report
6 Jan	18:30	Jakarta Bhayangkara Presisi	3–0	Palembang Bank Sumsel Babel	25–22	28–26	25–15			78–63	Report
7 Jan	14:00	Kudus Sukun Badak	1–3	Surabaya BIN Samator	19–25	25–18	16–25	22–25		82–93	Report
7 Jan	18:30	Jakarta STIN BIN	3–0	Jakarta BNI 46	25–23	25–22	25–20			75–65	Report
8 Jan	12:00	Surabaya BIN Samator	3–0	Jakarta Pertamina Pertamax	25–18	25–20	25–20			75–58	Report
8 Jan	14:00	Jakarta Bhayangkara Presisi	3–0	Jakarta BNI 46	25–15	25–19	25–20			75–54	Report
8 Jan	18:30	Jakarta STIN BIN	2–3	Jakarta LavAni Allo Bank	22–25	21–25	31–29	25–18	12–15	111–112	Report
Week 2 — Purwokerto
12 Jan	14:00	Kudus Sukun Badak	0–3	Jakarta LavAni Allo Bank	21–25	14–25	20–25			55–75	Report
12 Jan	18:30	Jakarta BNI 46	2–3	Jakarta Pertamina Pertamax	18–25	25–22	25–18	13–25	7–15	88–105	Report
13 Jan	16:00	Jakarta STIN BIN	3–0	Palembang Bank Sumsel Babel	25–19	25–16	25–20			75–55	Report
13 Jan	18:30	Kudus Sukun Badak	0–3	Jakarta BNI 46	14–25	23–25	20–25			57–75	Report
14 Jan	14:00	Surabaya BIN Samator	3–1	Jakarta Bhayangkara Presisi	25–23	23–25	31–29	25–20		104–97	Report
14 Jan	18:30	Jakarta STIN BIN	3–1	Jakarta Pertamina Pertamax	26–28	25–22	25–20	25–23		101–93	Report
15 Jan	12:00	Surabaya BIN Samator	1–3	Jakarta LavAni Allo Bank	25–27	13–25	25–23	21–25		84–100	Report
15 Jan	14:00	Kudus Sukun Badak	1–3	Jakarta Bhayangkara Presisi	18–25	23–25	25–22	19–25		85–97	Report
15 Jan	18:30	Palembang Bank Sumsel Babel	0–3	Jakarta Pertamina Pertamax	20–25	19–25	25–27			64–77	Report
Week 3 — Palembang
19 Jan	14:00	Jakarta STIN BIN	1–3	Jakarta Bhayangkara Presisi	25–15	25–27	22–25	12–25		84–92	Report
19 Jan	18:30	Palembang Bank Sumsel Babel	2–3	Jakarta LavAni Allo Bank	18–25	25–21	20–25	25–22	12–15	100–108	Report
20 Jan	16:00	Kudus Sukun Badak	3–0	Jakarta Pertamina Pertamax	31–29	25–21	25–19			81–69	Report
20 Jan	18:30	Surabaya BIN Samator	1–3	Jakarta BNI 46	21–25	21–25	25–19	23–25		90–94	Report
21 Jan	14:00	Jakarta Bhayangkara Presisi	3–2	Jakarta LavAni Allo Bank	21–25	22–25	25–18	31–29	15–10	114–107	Report
21 Jan	18:30	Kudus Sukun Badak	1–3	Palembang Bank Sumsel Babel	23–25	20–25	25–22	22–25		90–97	Report
22 Jan	12:00	Jakarta Bhayangkara Presisi	3–0	Jakarta Pertamina Pertamax	25–19	25–16	27–25			77–60	Report
22 Jan	14:00	Jakarta STIN BIN	3–0	Surabaya BIN Samator	25–22	25–20	25–22			75–64	Report
22 Jan	18:30	Jakarta BNI 46	3–1	Palembang Bank Sumsel Babel	25–17	25–21	23–25	25–23		98–86	Report

==== Leg 2 ====
Date	Time		Score		Set 1	Set 2	Set 3	Set 4	Set 5	Total	Report
Week 4 — Gresik
2 Feb	14:00	Jakarta STIN BIN	3–0	Surabaya BIN Samator	25–15	25–20	25–21			75–56	Report
2 Feb	16:00	Kudus Sukun Badak	0–3	Jakarta Bhayangkara Presisi	15–25	23–25	21–25			59–75	Report
2 Feb	18:30	Palembang Bank Sumsel Babel	0–3	Jakarta LavAni Allo Bank	23–25	16–25	20–25			59–75	Report
3 Feb	16:00	Jakarta BNI 46	0–3	Surabaya BIN Samator	23–25	21–25	23–25			67–75	Report
3 Feb	18:30	Jakarta Pertamina Pertamax	1–3	Jakarta Bhayangkara Presisi	25–19	17–25	20–25	23–25		85–94	Report
4 Feb	14:00	Jakarta LavAni Allo Bank	3–0	Kudus Sukun Badak	25–18	25–17	25–15			75–50	Report
4 Feb	18:30	Palembang Bank Sumsel Babel	0–3	Jakarta STIN BIN	15–25	16–25	21–25			52–75	Report
5 Feb	12:00	Kudus Sukun Badak	0–3	Jakarta BNI 46	29–31	22–25	11–25			62–81	Report
5 Feb	14:00	Jakarta Pertamina Pertamax	2–3	Jakarta STIN BIN	25–27	26–28	25–23	25–18	11–15	112–111	Report
5 Feb	18:30	Palembang Bank Sumsel Babel	1–3	Surabaya BIN Samator	25–22	17–25	17–25	21–25		80–97	Report
Week 5 — Malang
9 Feb	14:00	Jakarta LavAni Allo Bank	3–1	Surabaya BIN Samator	25–19	24–26	25–16	25–18		99–79	Report
9 Feb	18:30	Jakarta STIN BIN	3–1	Jakarta BNI 46	25–19	19–25	25–23	25–19		94–86	Report
10 Feb	16:00	Palembang Bank Sumsel Babel	0–3	Jakarta Bhayangkara Presisi	23–25	18–25	20–25			61–75	Report
10 Feb	18:30	Jakarta LavAni Allo Bank	3–0	Jakarta STIN BIN	25–23	25–22	25–16			75–61	Report
11 Feb	14:00	Kudus Sukun Badak	0–3	Jakarta Pertamina Pertamax	21–25	15–25	22–25			58–75	Report
11 Feb	18:30	Palembang Bank Sumsel Babel	0–3	Jakarta BNI 46	17–25	20–25	20–25			57–75	Report
12 Feb	12:00	Kudus Sukun Badak	0–3	Surabaya BIN Samator	23–25	22–25	21–25			66–75	Report
12 Feb	14:00	Jakarta LavAni Allo Bank	3–0	Jakarta Pertamina Pertamax	25–20	25–20	29–27			79–67	Report
12 Feb	18:30	Jakarta Bhayangkara Presisi	3–2	Jakarta BNI 46	25–20	16–25	20–25	25–23	18–16	104–109	Report
Week 6 — Yogyakarta
16 Feb	14:00	Palembang Bank Sumsel Babel	3–2	Jakarta Pertamina Pertamax	25–20	20–25	29–31	25–22	17–15	116–113	Report
16 Feb	18:30	Jakarta Bhayangkara Presisi	3–1	Surabaya BIN Samator	26–24	25–19	22–25	25–21		98–89	Report
17 Feb	16:00	Jakarta LavAni Allo Bank	3–0	Jakarta BNI 46	25–19	25–18	25–19			75–56	Report
17 Feb	18:30	Kudus Sukun Badak	1–3	Jakarta STIN BIN	27–25	22–25	17–25	22–25		88–100	Report
18 Feb	14:00	Jakarta Pertamina Pertamax	0–3	Surabaya BIN Samator	20–25	18–25	22–25			60–75	Report
18 Feb	18:30	Jakarta LavAni Allo Bank	3–0	Jakarta Bhayangkara Presisi	25–15	40–38	25–22			90–75	Report
19 Feb	12:00	Jakarta Pertamina Pertamax	3–1	Jakarta BNI 46	25–20	23–25	25–22	25–23		98–90	Report
19 Feb	14:00	Palembang Bank Sumsel Babel	3–2	Kudus Sukun Badak	30–28	22–25	25–20	22–25	15–13	114–111	Report
19 Feb	18:30	Jakarta STIN BIN	3–0	Jakarta Bhayangkara Presisi	25–21	25–18	25–20			75–59	Report

== Final round ==
- In the final round, Indonesian Volleyball Federation uses video challenge technology.
- Four teams played two legs with a double round robin system.
- 3rd and 4th rank advance to the 3rd place match, and 1st and 2nd rank advance to the final.
- All times are local, WIB (UTC+07:00).

=== Semifinals ===
==== League table ====
Pos	Team	Pld	W	L	Pts	SW	SL	SR	SPW	SPL	SPR	Qualification
1	Jakarta LavAni Allo Bank	6	6	0	16	18	6	3.000	552	506	1.091	Final
2	Jakarta Bhayangkara Presisi	6	3	3	12	15	10	1.500	553	520	1.063	Final
3	Jakarta STIN BIN	6	3	3	8	11	11	1.000	497	491	1.012	3rd place match
4	Surabaya BIN Samator	6	0	6	0	1	18	0.056	388	473	0.820	3rd place match

==== Fixtures and results ====
Date	Time		Score		Set 1	Set 2	Set 3	Set 4	Set 5	Total	Report
Week 7 — Gresik
23 Feb	18:30	Jakarta STIN BIN	3–2	Jakarta Bhayangkara Presisi	23–25	25–18	25–17	22–25	17–15	112–100	Report
24 Feb	18:30	Jakarta LavAni Allo Bank	3–0	Surabaya BIN Samator	25–20	25–22	25–16			75–58	Report
25 Feb	18:30	Jakarta STIN BIN	3–0	Surabaya BIN Samator	25–23	25–22	25–21			75–66	Report
26 Feb	18:30	Jakarta LavAni Allo Bank	3–2	Jakarta Bhayangkara Presisi	18–25	28–26	16–25	25–17	15–13	102–106	Report
Week 8 — Semarang
2 Mar	16:00	Jakarta Bhayangkara Presisi	3–0	Surabaya BIN Samator	25–21	25–22	25–19			75–62	Report
3 Mar	16:00	Jakarta LavAni Allo Bank	3–1	Jakarta STIN BIN	25–23	25–21	19–25	25–22		94–91	Report
4 Mar	16:00	Jakarta STIN BIN	0–3	Jakarta Bhayangkara Presisi	18–25	22–25	22–25			62–75	Report
5 Mar	16:00	Surabaya BIN Samator	0–3	Jakarta LavAni Allo Bank	19–25	22–25	26–28			67–78	Report
Week 9 — Solo
9 Mar	18:30	Jakarta STIN BIN	3–0	Surabaya BIN Samator	25–23	25–19	25–16			75–58	Report
10 Mar	18:30	Jakarta LavAni Allo Bank	3–2	Jakarta Bhayangkara Presisi	20–25	25–20	25–20	20–25	15–12	105–102	Report
11 Mar	18:30	Jakarta Bhayangkara Presisi	3–1	Surabaya BIN Samator	25–17	25–15	20–25	25–20		95–77	Report
12 Mar	18:30	Jakarta LavAni Allo Bank	3–1	Jakarta STIN BIN	23–25	25–21	25–16	25–20		98–82	Report

=== 3rd place match ===
Date	Time		Score		Set 1	Set 2	Set 3	Set 4	Set 5	Total	Report
19 Mar	15:00	Jakarta STIN BIN	3–0	Surabaya BIN Samator	31–29	25–23	25–18			81–70	Report

=== Final ===
Date	Time		Score		Set 1	Set 2	Set 3	Set 4	Set 5	Total	Report
19 Mar	17:00	Jakarta LavAni Allo Bank	3–2	Jakarta Bhayangkara Presisi	25–22	22–25	24–26	25–21	15–9	111–103	Report

== Final standings ==
Qualified for the 2023 Asian Club Championship
Qualified for the 2023 SEA Men's V.League

Rank	Team
1st place, gold medalist(s)	Jakarta LavAni Allo Bank
2nd place, silver medalist(s)	Jakarta Bhayangkara Presisi
3rd place, bronze medalist(s)	Jakarta STIN BIN
4	Surabaya BIN Samator
5	Jakarta BNI 46
6	Jakarta Pertamina Pertamax
7	Palembang Bank Sumsel Babel
8	Kudus Sukun Badak

2023 men's Proliga Champions

Second title

16–man roster
Daffa Naufal, Yohanes Dedi, Boy Arnes, Hendra Kurniawan, Musabhikan, Leandro Martins, Elvin Fajar, Prasojo, Jordan Susanto, Fahry Septian, Muhammad Malizi, Irpan, Dio Zulfikri, Reihan Andiko, Jorge García, Nanda Waliyu
Head coach
Nicolas Vives

== Awards ==
- Most valuable player
  (Indonesia) Fahry Septian (Jakarta LavAni Allo Bank)
- Best coach
  (Cuba) Nicolas Vives (Jakarta LavAni Allo Bank)
- Best scorer
  (Indonesia) Rivan Nurmulki (Surabaya BIN Samator)
- Best libero
  (Indonesia) Muhamad Ridwan (Jakarta STIN BIN)
- Best setter
  (Indonesia) Dio Zulfikri (Jakarta LavAni Allo Bank)
- Best blocker
  (Indonesia) Hendra Kurniawan (Jakarta LavAni Allo Bank)
- Best spiker
  (Uganda) Daudi Okello (Jakarta Bhayangkara Presisi)
- Best server
  (Indonesia) Farhan Halim (Jakarta STIN BIN)
