= 2025 Alas Pilipinas Invitationals =

Friendly volleyball tournament

Alas Pilipinas Invitationals
- 2025

Tournament information
- Sport: Volleyball
- Location: Quezon City, Philippines
- Dates: June 10–12, 2025
- Host(s): Philippines
- Venue(s): 1
- Teams: 4

The 2025 Alas Pilipinas Invitationals was a friendly volleyball tournament hosted by the Philippine National Volleyball Federation from June 10 to 12, 2025.

The tournament was organized to serve as preparation for the Philippine men's national team's (Alas Pilipinas) upcoming stint in the 2025 FIVB Men's Volleyball World Championship which will also be hosted in the Philippines.

== Participating teams ==
Team	Association	Head coach	Team captain	Notes
Philippines (hosts)	Philippine National Volleyball Federation	(Italy) Angiolino Frigoni	(Philippines) Marck Espejo	National team
(Indonesia) Jakarta Bhayangkara Presisi	Indonesian Volleyball Federation	(Cuba) Reidel Toiran	(Indonesia) Nizar Zulfikar	2024 Proliga champions
(South Korea) Hyundai Capital Skywalkers	Korea Volleyball Federation	(Italy) Fabio Storti	(South Korea) Jeong Tae-joon	2024–25 V-League champions
Thailand	Thailand Volleyball Association	(South Korea) Park Ki-won	(Thailand) Amorntep Konhan	National team

== Venue ==
Quezon City, Philippines
Smart Araneta Coliseum
Capacity: 14,429
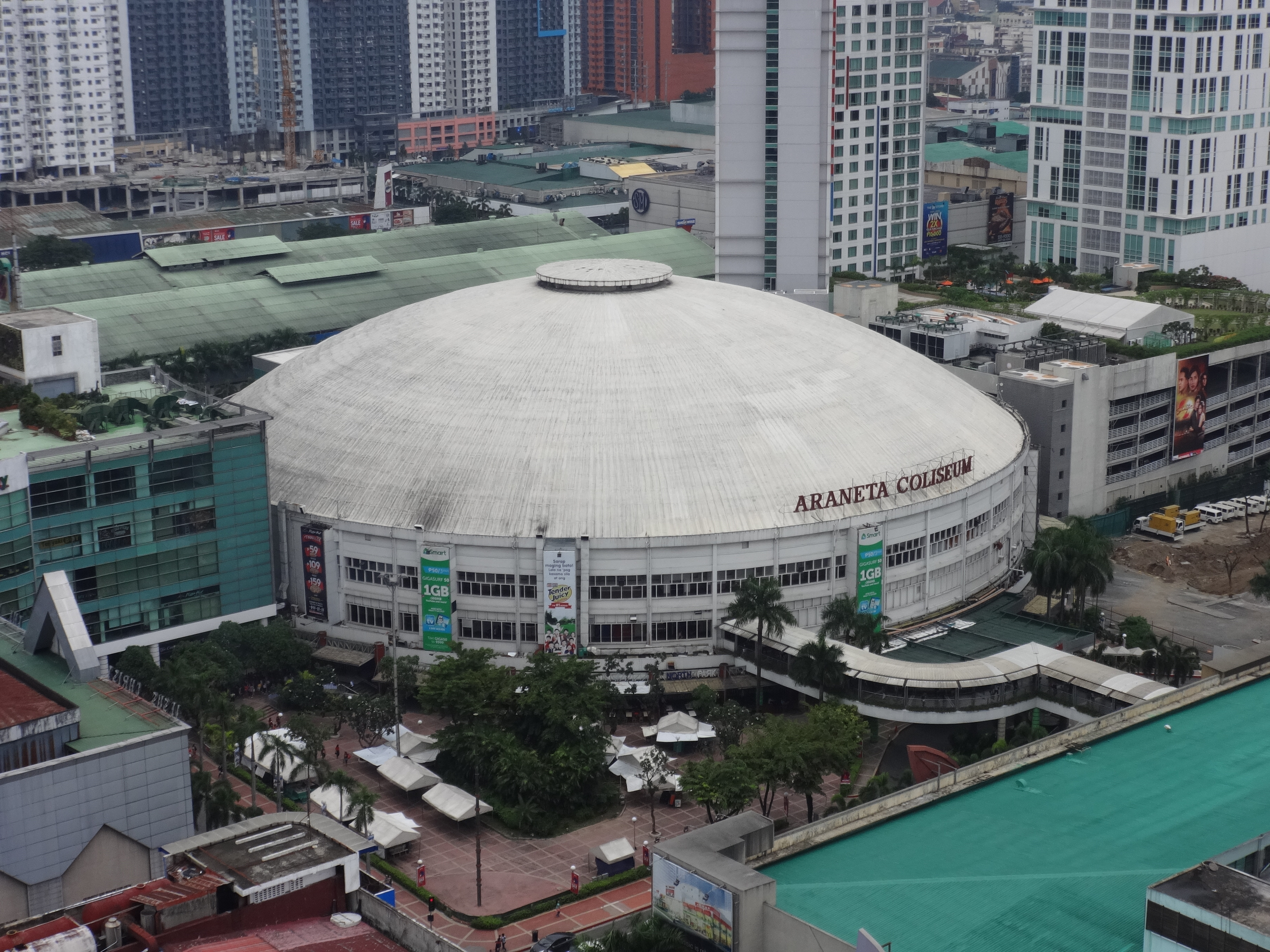

== Results ==
- All times are Philippine Standard Time (UTC+08:00).

Pos	Team	Pld	W	L	Pts	SW	SL	SR	SPW	SPL	SPR
1st place, gold medalist(s)	Philippines (H)	3	3	0	8	9	4	2.250	306	288	1.063
2nd place, silver medalist(s)	Thailand	3	2	1	7	8	4	2.000	270	258	1.047
3rd place, bronze medalist(s)	(Indonesia) Jakarta Bhayangkara Presisi	3	1	2	2	4	8	0.500	265	274	0.967
4	(South Korea) Hyundai Capital Skywalkers	3	0	3	1	4	9	0.444	272	203	1.340

Source: TicketNet.com
(H) Host

Date	Time		Score		Set 1	Set 2	Set 3	Set 4	Set 5	Total	Report
Jun 10	16:00	Hyundai Capital Skywalkers (South Korea)	1–3	Thailand	22–25	26–24	19–25	21–25		88–99	Report
Jun 10	19:30	Jakarta Bhayangkara Presisi (Indonesia)	1–3	Philippines	23–25	29–27	21–25	22–25		95–102	Report
Jun 11	16:00	Thailand	3–0	(Indonesia) Jakarta Bhayangkara Presisi	25–20	26–24	25–19			76–63	Report
Jun 11	19:30	Hyundai Capital Skywalkers (South Korea)	1–3	Philippines	22–25	25–22	21–25	20–25		88–97	Report
Jun 12	16:00	Jakarta Bhayangkara Presisi (Indonesia)	3–2	(South Korea) Hyundai Capital Skywalkers	22–25	25–12	25–23	20–25	15–11	107–96	
Jun 12	19:30	Philippines	3–2	Thailand	21–25	25–21	25–22	21–25	15–12	107–105	
