= Farhan Halim =

Indonesian volleyball player (born 2001)

Personal information
- Full name: Farhan Halim
- Nickname: Farhan
- Born: 26 April 2001 (age 25); Bandung Regency, West Java, Indonesia
- Height: 193 cm (6 ft 4 in)
- Weight: 80 kg (180 lb)
- Spike: 355 cm (11 ft 8 in)
- Block: 335 cm (11 ft 0 in)
- Education: Pasundan University

Volleyball information
- Position: Outside hitter
- Current club: VC Nagano Tridents
- Number: 9 (Club); 14 (National team)

Career
Years	Teams
2018–2020, 2022	(Indonesia) Jakarta Pertamina Pertamax
2019, 2022, 2023	(Indonesia) Pasundan Bandung
2021	(United Arab Emirates) Hatta Club Dubai VC
2023	(Indonesia) Jakarta STIN BIN
2023, 2025, 2026	(Indonesia) Jakarta Bhayangkara Presisi (loan 2023)
2023–2024	(Thailand) Nakhon Ratchasima
2025–2026	(Japan) VC Nagano Tridents

National team
2022–	Indonesia
Honours
Men's volleyball
Representing Indonesia
AVC Cup
Gold medal – first place	2026 Ahmedabad	Team
SEA Games
Gold medal – first place	2021 Vietnam	Team
Gold medal – first place	2023 Cambodia	Team
SEA V Cup
Gold medal – first place	2023 Bogor	Team
Gold medal – first place	2023 Santa Rosa	Team
Gold medal – first place	2025 Jakarta	Team
Silver medal – second place	2024 Manila	Team
Silver medal – second place	2024 Yogyakarta	Team
Silver medal – second place	2025 Candon City	Team
Silver medal – second place	2026 Candon City	Team
Bronze medal – third place	2026 Jakarta	Team

Farhan Halim (born 26 April 2001) is an Indonesian volleyball player. He is currently defending the Jakarta Bhayangkara Presisi club in 2023 Proliga. He has also been an Indonesia men's national volleyball team player since 2022.

== Club career ==
Farhan is one of the players scouted by the Pasundan Bandung. At a young age, he was even appointed by the coach as club captain in several competitions Pasundan participated in.

Farhan's professional career began when he joined Jakarta Pertamina Energi (now Jakarta Pertamina Pertamax) in Proliga 2019 season and continued in 2020 season. After his first season at the Proliga, he helped the Pasundan Bandung club succeed in promotion to Livoli Division I after winning the Livoli Division I 2019 season.

In 2021, he was contracted by Hatta Club Dubai VC to take part in the 2021 United Arab Emirates Junior Volleyball League. A year later, he rejoined Jakarta Pertamina Pertamax at the 2022 Proliga and Pasundan Bandung in 2022 Livoli Premier Division. In 2023, he joined Jakarta STIN BIN for 2023 Proliga.

== International career ==
His career in the Indonesian national team began in 2022 at the event 2021 Southeast Asian Games. He helped the team win a gold medal at the event.

== Awards ==
=== Individual ===
- 2022 Proliga – Best server
- 2023 Proliga – Best server
- 2023 SEA V.League – First Leg – Best outside spiker
- 2023 SEA V.League – Second Leg – Most valuable player
- 2023–24 Thailand League – Best server

=== Club ===
- 2023 Proliga – 3rd place, with Jakarta STIN BIN
- 2023 Asian Club Championship – Runners-up, with Jakarta Bhayangkara Presisi
- 2023–24 Thailand League – Champion, with Nakhon Ratchasima
- 2025 Proliga – Champion, with Jakarta Bhayangkara Presisi
- 2026 AVC Champions League – Champion, with Jakarta Bhayangkara Presisi

== Personal life ==
Farhan is a recipient of a scholarship from the Paguyuban Pasundan and has the right to pursue higher education at the Faculty of Social and Political Science, Pasundan University since 2019. Before seriously pursuing volleyball, Farhan was once constrained by the loss of two of his little fingers which had to be amputated due to being pinched by the elbow supporting the water reservoir when he was in elementary school.
