= Doni Haryono =

Indonesian volleyball player (born 1999)

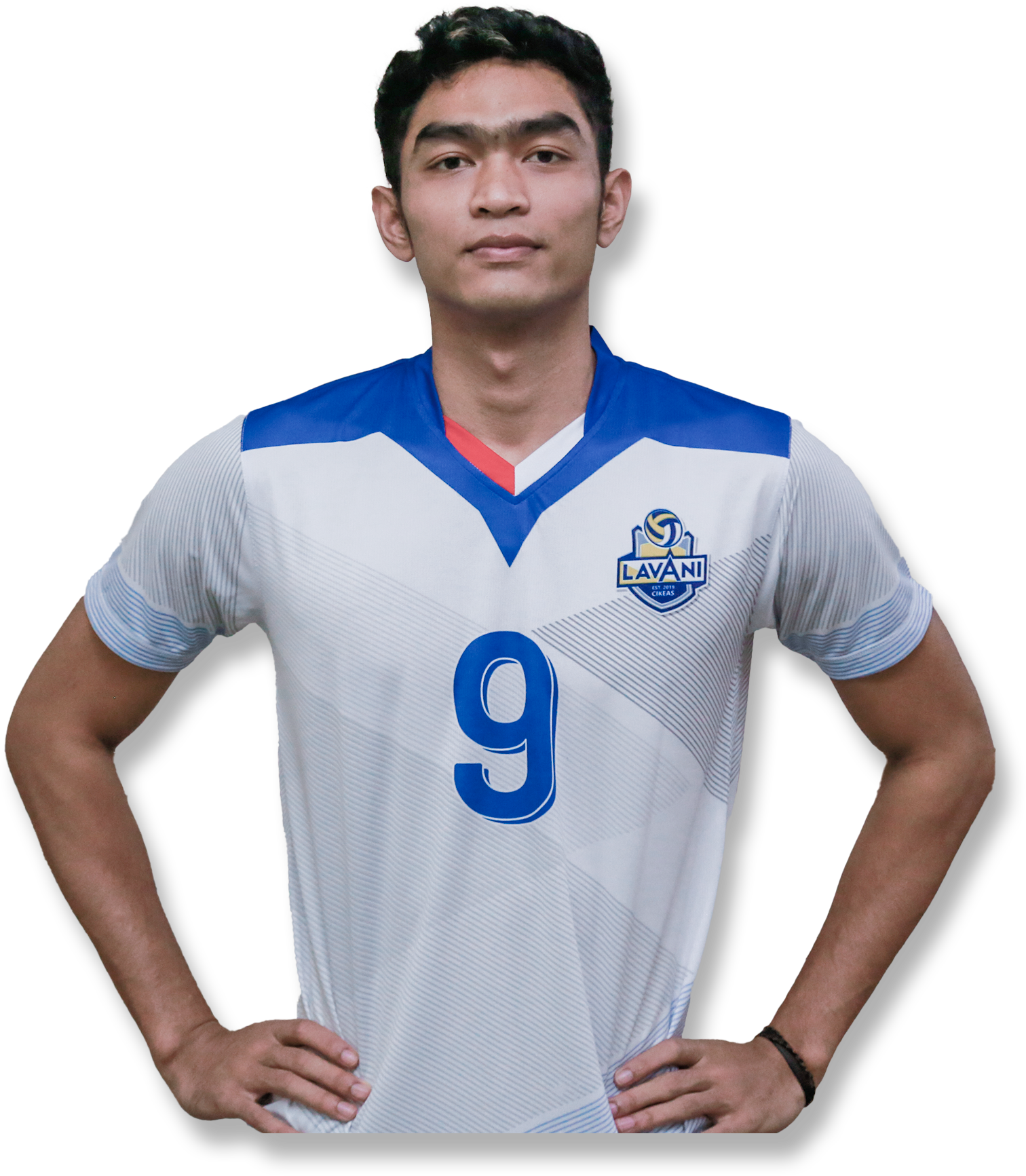

Personal information
- Full name: Doni Haryono
- Born: 21 February 1999 (age 27); Magelang, Central Java, Indonesia
- Height: 191 cm (6 ft 3 in)
- Weight: 78 kg (172 lb)
- Spike: 360 cm (11 ft 10 in)
- Block: 335 cm (11 ft 0 in)

Volleyball information
- Position: Outside hitter
- Current club: Nakhon Ratchasima
- Number: 11

National team
2015–	Indonesia
Honours
Men's volleyball
Representing Indonesia
AVC Cup
Gold medal – first place	2026 Ahmedabad	Team
SEA Games
Gold medal – first place	2019 Philippines	Team
Gold medal – first place	2021 Vietnam	Team
Gold medal – first place	2023 Cambodia	Team
Silver medal – second place	2017 Kuala Lumpur	Team
SEA V Cup
Gold medal – first place	2023 Bogor	Team
Gold medal – first place	2023 Santa Rosa	Team
Silver medal – second place	2026 Candon City	Team
ASEAN School Games
Silver medal – second place	2016 Chiang Mai	Team

Doni Haryono (born 21 February 1999) is an Indonesian volleyball player. He is a member of the Indonesia men's national volleyball team.

== Clubs ==
- (Indonesia) Bekasi BVN (2016)
- (Indonesia) Jakarta Pertamina Energi (2017–18)
- (Indonesia) Jakarta BNI 46 (2019)
- (Bahrain) Al Nasser (2020–21)
- (Indonesia) Bogor LavAni (2022)
- (Japan) VC Nagano Tridents (2023–24)
- (Cambodia) Body Guard Unit (2024)
- (Indonesia) Jakarta STIN BIN (2024)
- (Thailand) Nakhon Ratchasima (2024–2026)

== Awards ==
=== Individual ===
- 2019 SEA Games – "Most Valuable Player"
- 2022 Indonesian Proliga – "Most Valuable Player"

=== Club ===
- 2017 Indonesian men's Proliga – Champion, with Jakarta Pertamina Energi
- 2019 Indonesian men's Proliga – Runner-Up, with Jakarta BNI 46
- 2022 Indonesian men's Proliga – Champion, with Bogor LavAni
- 2024 Techo Volleyball Cambodia League 2024 – Champion, with Bodyguard Headquarter
- 2024–25 Thailand League – Champion, with Nakhon Ratchasima
- 2025–26 Thailand League – Champion, with Nakhon Ratchasima
