= Kudus Sukun Badak =

Indonesian volleyball club

- Full name: Kudus Sukun Badak Volleyball Club
- Short name: KBS
- Founded: 2018; 8 years ago
- Ground: Sukun Sport Center; Kudus, Central Java, Indonesia (Capacity: 500)
- Owner: Sukun Cigarette Factory
- Manager: (Indonesia) Ibarsyah Djanu Tjahyono
- Captain: (Indonesia) Aji Maulana
- League: Proliga
- 2023: Regular season: 8th Postseason: Did not qualify

Uniforms
Home	Away

Kudus Sukun Badak is an Indonesian professional volleyball team. The team was founded in 2018 and became fully professional in 2022. They are based in Kudus and are members of the Indonesian Volleyball Federation (PBVSI). Their home arena is Sukun Sport Center in Kudus.

== Honours ==
- Proliga

4th: 2022

== Season-by-season records ==
Kudus Sukun Badak
Season	Postseason	Regular season				
Season	Postseason	Rank	Games	Wins	Loss	Points
2022	Did not qualify	5	10	2	8	7
2023	Did not qualify	8	14	1	13	4

== Players ==
=== 2023 team ===
Kudus Sukun Badak – 2023 Proliga
Number	Name	Birthdate	Height (cm)	Position
1	(Indonesia) Made Harin Mayena	March 9, 2001 (age 25)	190	Outside hitter
2	(Indonesia) Viko Zulfan Aditya	June 5, 2001 (age 25)	190	Setter
3	(Indonesia) Adik Tri Yulianto	July 14, 2000 (age 26)	187	Middle blocker
4	(Indonesia) Sapta Rafi Sanjaya	September 15, 2002 (age 23)	190	Opposite
5	(Indonesia) Muhammad Karunia Rachman		197	Middle blocker
6	(Indonesia) Muhammad Saiful Anwar		168	Libero
7	(Australia) Hamish Hazelden	July 14, 1996 (age 30)	210	Opposite
8	(Indonesia) Rifki Ferdianto	February 19, 2003 (age 23)	188	Opposite
10	(Indonesia) Muhammad Adnan Al'ihza		183	Setter
11	(Indonesia) Agung Seganti	May 15, 1990 (age 36)	192	Outside hitter
12	(Indonesia) Louis Tafarel Ardian Tobias	February 20, 2003 (age 23)	187	Outside hitter
13	(Indonesia) Mochamad Syahril Amri	December 7, 2000 (age 25)	195	Middle blocker
15	(Indonesia) Dimas Setiawan		195	Middle blocker
16	(Indonesia) Bastian Tamtomo Putro	April 17, 1992 (age 34)	178	Libero
17	(Indonesia) Aji Maulana (c)	October 11, 1990 (age 35)	185	Setter
18	(Indonesia) Rahmad Kurniadi		190	Outside hitter
24	(Canada) Jared Jarvis	December 22, 1995 (age 30)	197	Outside hitter
22	(Indonesia) Agus Prasetyo	August 22, 2001 (age 24)	195	Middle blocker

Coach: (Indonesia) Ibarsyah Djanu Tjahyono
Assistant coaches: Nur Widayanto, Nur Rosyid
