= Proliga =

Proliga can refer to different sports leagues:

- Proliga (Indonesia), the Indonesian top-flight volleyball competition
- Proliga (Portugal), the Portuguese second-tier basketball competition
