= Proliga (Indonesia) =

Indonesian professional top level competition for volleyball clubs

- Sport: Volleyball
- Founded: 2002; 24 years ago
- Founder: PBVSI
- No. of teams: Men: 5 Women: 7
- Country: Indonesia
- Most recent champions: Men: Jakarta LavAni (3rd title); Women: Jakarta Pertamina Enduro (4th title)
- Most titles: Men: Surabaya Samator (7 titles); Women: Jakarta Elektrik PLN (6 titles)
- Broadcasters: Moji; Champions TV; Vidio; IndiHome TV
- Website: Proliga

Proliga is the Indonesian professional top level competition for volleyball clubs. It is organised by Persatuan Bola Voli Seluruh Indonesia (PBVSI) or Indonesian Volleyball Association. There are both men's Proliga and women's Proliga competitions. Both were founded in 2002.

== History ==
The Proliga was first held in 2002, from February 1 to April 7, 2002 and was held in five cities, namely Jakarta, Bogor, Bandung, Yogyakarta and Gresik. The final party itself was held at the Istora Gelora Bung Karno Jakarta.

The launch of Proliga was the result of a breakthrough by Rita Subowo who at that time served as General Chairperson of PP PBVSI. He saw that there was a decline in volleyball both in terms of coaching, competition and achievement, for this reason there was a need for more professional competition. Through Proliga, Rita hopes that the declining popularity of volleyball in society will become as passionate as before.

== Competition format ==
In each season, each volleyball club will meet other clubs in two rounds of preliminary rounds with a full competition format. The four clubs in each competition category with the highest ranking have the right to qualify for the Final Four.

Depending on the regulations from the committee, in the Final Four the four clubs that have qualified will meet again, either again through a full competition system, a half competition system, or even directly facing each other through a knockout system. The clubs ranked third and fourth (or losing their knockout matches) in the Final Four will compete again in the third place match. Meanwhile, the clubs ranked first and second (or winning in knockout matches) in this round will meet in the final. The last two matches are only played once to determine the third place team and Proliga champion in each season.

From 2026 onwards, the third place and championship grand finals will be played with the best-of-three format.

== Men's competition ==
=== Men's champions ===
==== Titles by season ====
Season	Champions	Runners-up	Ref.
2002	Bandung Tectona	Surabaya Flame	
2003	Jakarta Phinisi Bank BNI	Surabaya Flame	
2004	Surabaya Samator	Bandung Tectona	
2005	Jakarta BNI Taplus	Jakarta Monas Bank DKI	
2006	Jakarta BNI Taplus	Surabaya Samator	
2007	Surabaya Samator	Jakarta BNI Taplus	
2008	Jakarta P2B Sananta	Jakarta BNI Taplus	
2009	Surabaya Samator	Jakarta Sananta	
2010	Jakarta BNI Taplus	Surabaya Samator	
2011	Palembang Bank Sumsel Babel	Jakarta Sananta	
2012	Jakarta BNI Taplus	Semarang Bank Jateng	
2013	Palembang Bank Sumsel Babel	Jakarta BNI Taplus	
2014	Surabaya Samator	Jakarta Pertamina Energi	
2015	Jakarta Elektrik PLN	Surabaya Samator	
2016	Surabaya Bhayangkara Samator	Jakarta BNI Taplus	
2017	Jakarta Pertamina Energi	Palembang Bank Sumsel Babel	
2018	Surabaya Bhayangkara Samator	Palembang Bank Sumsel Babel	
2019	Surabaya Bhayangkara Samator	Jakarta BNI 46	
~~2020~~	Season cancelled due to COVID-19 in Indonesia		
~~2021~~	Season cancelled due to COVID-19 in Indonesia		
2022	Bogor LavAni	Surabaya Bhayangkara Samator	
2023	Jakarta LavAni Allo Bank	Jakarta Bhayangkara Presisi	
2024	Jakarta Bhayangkara Presisi	Jakarta LavAni Allo Bank Electric	
2025	Jakarta Bhayangkara Presisi	Jakarta LavAni Allo Bank Electric	
2026	Jakarta LavAni Livin' Transmedia	Jakarta Bhayangkara Presisi	

== Women's competition ==
=== Women's champions ===
==== Titles by season ====
Season	Champions	Runner-up	Ref.
2002	Jakarta Monas	Gresik Petrokimia	
2003	Bandung Art Deco Bank Jabar	Gresik Petrokimia	
2004	Jakarta Elektrik PLN	Gresik Petrokimia	
2005	Jakarta BNI Taplus	Jakarta Elektrik PLN	
2006	Bandung Art Deco Bank Jabar	Gresik Petrokimia	
2007	Surabaya Bank Jatim	Gresik Petrokimia	
2008	Surabaya Bank Jatim	Jakarta Elektrik PLN	
2009	Jakarta Elektrik PLN	Surabaya Bank Jatim	
2010	Jakarta BNI Taplus	Jakarta Elektrik PLN	
2011	Jakarta Elektrik PLN	Jakarta Popsivo Polwan	
2012	Jakarta Popsivo Polwan	Jakarta Elektrik PLN	
2013	Jakarta PGN Popsivo Polwan	Manokwari Valeria Papua Barat	
2014	Jakarta Pertamina Energi	Manokwari Valeria Papua Barat	
2015	Jakarta Elektrik PLN	Jakarta PGN Popsivo Polwan	
2016	Jakarta Elektrik PLN	Jakarta Pertamina Energi	
2017	Jakarta Elektrik PLN	Jakarta Pertamina Energi	
2018	Jakarta Pertamina Energi	Bandung Bank BJB Pakuan	
2019	Jakarta PGN Popsivo Polwan	Jakarta Pertamina Energi	
~~2020~~	Season cancelled due to COVID-19 in Indonesia		
~~2021~~	Season cancelled due to COVID-19 in Indonesia		
2022	Bandung BJB Tandamata	Gresik Petrokimia Pupuk Indonesia	
2023	Bandung BJB Tandamata	Jakarta Pertamina Fastron	
2024	Jakarta BIN	Jakarta Elektrik PLN	
2025	Jakarta Pertamina Enduro	Jakarta Popsivo Polwan	
2026	Jakarta Pertamina Enduro	Gresik Petrokimia Pupuk Indonesia	

== Title sponsors ==
Season	Sponsor	Name
2002	No sponsor	Proliga
2003	Krating Daeng	Kratingdaeng Proliga
2004–2011	Sampoerna Hijau	Sampoerna Hijau Voli Proliga
2012–2014	Bina Sarana Informatika	BSI Proliga Bola Voli
2015–2016	Pertamina	Pertamina Proliga
2017–2020	No sponsor	Proliga
2022–present	Perusahaan Listrik Negara	PLN Mobile Proliga
