= Rivan Nurmulki =

Indonesian volleyball player (born 1995)

Personal information
- Full name: Rivan Nurmulki
- Nationality: Indonesian
- Born: 16 July 1995 (age 31) Merangin, Jambi, Indonesia
- Home town: Surabaya, East Java, Indonesia
- Height: 195 cm (6 ft 5 in)
- Weight: 86 kg (190 lb)
- Spike: 360 cm (142 in)
- Block: 335 cm (132 in)

Volleyball information
- Position: Opposite spiker
- Current club: Wolfdogs Nagoya
- Number: 10

Career
- Years: Team
- 2013–2019: Surabaya Bhayangkara Samator
- 2019: Nakhon Ratchasima
- 2020–2022: VC Nagano Tridents
- 2023: Surabaya BIN Samator
- 2024: Jakarta STIN BIN
- 2024–: Wolfdogs Nagoya
- 2025: Thể Công

National team
- Years: Team
- 2015–: Indonesia
Honours
Men's volleyball
Representing Indonesia
SEA Games
Gold medal – first place	2019 Pasig	Team
Gold medal – first place	2021 Quảng Ninh	Team
Gold medal – first place	2023 Phnom Penh	Team
Silver medal – second place	2017 Kuala Lumpur	Team
Silver medal – second place	2025 Bangkok	Team
Bronze medal – third place	2015 Singapore	Team

Rivan Nurmulki (born 16 July 1995) is an Indonesian volleyball player. He is a member of the Indonesia men's national volleyball team.

== Early and personal life ==
Rivan was born in Jambi on 16 July 1995. He started playing volleyball at the age of 17.

In 2020, Rivan married to Aprilia Indah Puspitasari. They have one daughter together.

== Career ==
In 2013, Rivan joined his first professional club, Surabaya Samator. In 2019, he had played with a Thai club Nakhon Ratchasima The Mall. In 2020, he played with V.League Division 1 club VC Nagano Tridents.

He joined the national team in 2015, he has participated in 2017 Asian Volleyball Championship, 2018 Asian Games.

== Clubs ==
- (Indonesia) Surabaya Bhayangkara Samator (2013–2019)
- (Thailand) Nakhon Ratchasima The Mall (2019)
- (Japan) VC Nagano Tridents (2020–2022)
- (Indonesia) Surabaya BIN Samator (2023)
- (Indonesia) Jakarta STIN BIN (2024)
- (Japan) Wolfdogs Nagoya (2024–)
- (Vietnam) Thể Công (2025)

== Awards ==
=== Individual awards ===
- 2016 Indonesian men's Proliga – "Most valuable player"
- 2016 Indonesian men's Proliga – "Best spiker"
- 2017 Asian Volleyball Championship – "Best opposite spiker"
- 2018 Indonesian men's Proliga – "Most valuable player"
- 2018 LienVietPostBank Cup – "Most valuable player"
- 2019 Thai-Denmark Super League – "Most valuable player"
- 2023 Indonesian men's Proliga – "Best scorer"

=== Clubs ===
- 2014 Indonesian men's Proliga – Champion, with Surabaya Samator
- 2015 Indonesian men's Proliga – Runner-up, with Surabaya Samator
- 2016 Indonesian men's Proliga – Champion, with Surabaya Samator
- 2018 Indonesian men's Proliga – Champion, with Surabaya Bhayangkara Samator
- 2019 Indonesian men's Proliga – Champion, with Surabaya Bhayangkara Samator
- 2019 Thai-Denmark Super League – Champion, with Nakhon Ratchasima The Mall
- 2025 Vietnam League – Runner-up, with Thể Công
