= Bogor LavAni =

Men's volleyball team in Bogor Regency, West Java, Indonesia

Jakarta LavAni Livin Transmedia
- Full name: Jakarta LavAni Livin Transmedia
- Short name: LAV
- Founded: 1 December 2019; 6 years ago
- Ground: LavAni Sports Center, Bogor Regency
- Owner: Susilo Bambang Yudhoyono
- Chairman: Ossy Dermawan
- Head coach: Nicolas Vives
- Captain: Dio Zulfikri
- League: Proliga
- 2026: Champions
- Championships: Proliga Champion

Bogor LavAni is a men's volleyball team based at the LavAni Sports Center in Gunung Putri, Bogor Regency, West Java, Indonesia. The team was founded on 1 December 2019, by Susilo Bambang Yudhoyono, the sixth president of Indonesia.

The name "Bogor LavAni" is derived from three elements: "Bogor," the city where the team was founded; "Lav," a reference to the English word "Love"; and "Ani," the name of Susilo Bambang Yudhoyono's late wife, Ani Yudhoyono.

Although the team had initially planned to compete in Proliga in 2020, their debut was delayed by the COVID-19 pandemic. Bogor LavAni eventually made its first appearance in the Proliga, the top division of volleyball in Indonesia in 2022 where they won the championship, defeating Surabaya Bhayangkara Samator in the final round.

== Honours ==
Proliga

- Champions (3): 2022, 2023, 2026
- Runners-up (2): 2024, 2025

Livoli Premier Division

- Champions (2): 2024, 2025
- Runners-up (1): 2023

Livoli First Division

- Runners-up (1): 2022

== Season-by-season records ==
=== Proliga ===
Proliga
| Season | Postseason | Regular season | | | | | | | | | | |
| Season | Postseason | Rank | Games | Wins | Loss | Points | SW | SL | SR | SPW | SPL | SPR |
|---|---|---|---|---|---|---|---|---|---|---|---|---|
| 2022 | Champions | 3 | 10 | 6 | 4 | 20 | 24 | 16 | 1.500 | 937 | 852 | 1.100 |
| 2023 | Champions | 1 | 14 | 13 | 1 | 38 | 41 | 9 | 4.556 | 1222 | 1038 | 1.177 |
| 2024 | Runners-up | 1 | 12 | 10 | 2 | 31 | 32 | 8 | 4.000 | 957 | 837 | 1.143 |
| 2025 | Runners-up | 1 | 8 | 8 | 0 | 23 | 24 | 4 | 6.000 | 679 | 530 | 1.281 |
| 2026 | Champions | 1 | 8 | 8 | 0 | 24 | 24 | 2 | 12.000 | 655 | 515 | 1.272 |

=== Livoli ===
Livoli
| Season | League | Position |
|---|---|---|
| 2022 | First Division | Runners-up |
| 2023 | Premier Division | Runners-up |
| 2024 | Premier Division | Champions |
| 2025 | Premier Division | Champions |
| 2026 | Premier Division | TBA |

== Current roster ==
As of Proliga 2024

Jakarta LavAni Allo Bank – 2024
| No. | Name | Birth Date | Height | Position |
|---|---|---|---|---|
| 1 | (Indonesia) Daffa Naufal Mauluddani | 16 Juli 1998 | 193 cm | Middle blocker |
| 8 | (Iran) Mohammad Reza Beik | 08 Februari 2000 | 200 cm | Outside hitter |
| 3 | (Indonesia) Boy Arnes Arabi | 22 Oktober 2003 | 188 cm | Outside hitter |
| 4 | (Indonesia) Hendra Kurniawan | 27 Mei 2003 | 195 cm | Middle blocker |
| 5 | (Indonesia) Musabikhan Musa | 22 Oktober 2001 | 185 cm | Outside hitter |
| 6 | (Indonesia) Reyval Deho Fernanda | | 193 cm | Opposite |
| 8 | (Indonesia) Prasojo | 28 Februari 1999 | 184 cm | Libero |
| 9 | (Brazil) Renan Buiatti | 10 Januari 1990 | 217 cm | Opposite |
| 10 | (Indonesia) Fahri Septian Putratama | 26 September 1998 | 187 cm | Outside hitter |
| 11 | (Indonesia) Muhammad Malizi | 29 September 1994 | 195 cm | Middle blocker |
| 12 | (Indonesia) Irpan | 02 Desember 1997 | 173 cm | Libero |
| 15 | (Indonesia) Dio Zulfikri | 15 Desember 1996 | 187 cm | Setter |
| 16 | (Indonesia) Reihan Andiko Firli | 05 Maret 2003 | 193 cm | Setter |
| 17 | (Indonesia) Dio Sapto Nugroho | 02 Januari 2005 | 189 cm | Outside hitter |
| 20 | (Indonesia) Okky Damar Saputra | 15 Oktober 1999 | 190 cm | Opposite |
| 21 | (Indonesia) Putrada Tri Nugroho | 04 Mei 2005 | 196 cm | Middle blocker |
| 22 | (Indonesia) Nanda Waliyu Ramadhani | 29 Oktober 2003 | 189 cm | Outside hitter |
| 90 | (Indonesia) Dimas Saprijal | 04 Juni 2005 | 195 cm | Opposite |
