= 2023 Asian Men's Club Volleyball Championship =

International volleyball competition

- Official logo

Tournament details
- Host country: Bahrain
- City: Manama
- Dates: 14–21 May
- Teams: 16 (from 1 confederation)
- Venue: 2 (in 1 host city)

Final positions
- Champions: (Japan) Suntory Sunbirds (1st title)
- Runners-up: (Indonesia) Jakarta Bhayangkara Presisi
- Third place: (Qatar) Police SC
- Fourth place: (Iran) Shahdab Yazd

Tournament awards
- MVP: (Russia) Dmitry Muserskiy
- Best Setter: (Japan) Masaki Oya
- Best OH: (Cuba) Alain De Armas; (Iran) Mohammad Javad Manavinejad
- Best MB: (Qatar) Belal Nabel Abunabot; (Indonesia) Hendra Kurniawan
- Best OPP: (Iran) Amir Ghafour
- Best Libero: (Indonesia) Fahreza Rakha Abhinaya

Tournament statistics
- Matches played: 56
- Attendance: 3,030 (54 per match)

The 2023 Asian Men's Club Volleyball Championship was the 23rd edition of the Asian Men's Club Volleyball Championship, an annual international men's volleyball club tournament organized by the Asian Volleyball Confederation (AVC) with Bahrain Volleyball Association (BVA).

The tournament was held in Manama, Bahrain, from 14 to 21 May 2023. The champions qualified for the 2023 FIVB Volleyball Men's Club World Championship.

Suntory Sunbirds won the tournament for the first time by defeating Jakarta Bhayangkara Presisi in a hard-fought four sets in the final match. Dmitry Muserskiy named as the MVP of the tournament. Police SC secured the bronze against Shahdab Yazd also in a four-set match.

== Qualification ==
Following the AVC regulations, the maximum of 16 teams in all AVC events will be selected by:

- 1 team for the host country
- 10 teams based on the final standing of the previous edition
- 5 teams from each of 5 zones (with a qualification tournament if needed)

=== Qualified associations ===
Event(s)		Dates	Location	Berths	Qualifier(s)
Host Country		—N/a	—N/a	1	Bahrain
2022 Asian Championship		14–20 May 2022	(Iran) Tehran	6	Iran; Japan; Kazakhstan; Qatar; Thailand; Iraq
Direct zonal wildcards	Central Asia	No later than 15 January 2023	(Thailand) Bangkok	1	Afghanistan
Direct zonal wildcards	East Asia	No later than 15 January 2023	(Thailand) Bangkok	4	Chinese Taipei; Hong Kong; Mongolia; South Korea
Direct zonal wildcards	Oceania	No later than 15 January 2023	(Thailand) Bangkok	1	Australia
Direct zonal wildcards	South East Asia	No later than 15 January 2023	(Thailand) Bangkok	1	Indonesia
Direct zonal wildcards	West Asia	No later than 15 January 2023	(Thailand) Bangkok	2	Kuwait; Yemen
Total				16	

=== Participating teams ===
The following teams participated for the tournament.

Association	Team	Domestic league standing
Bahrain	Al-Ahli	2021–22 Bahrain League champions
Iran	Shahdab Yazd	2022–23 Iranian Volleyball Super League champions
Japan	Suntory Sunbirds	2021–22 V.League champions
Kazakhstan	Atyrau	2021–22 Kazakhstan Men's National League champions
Qatar	Police SC	2021–22 Qatari Volleyball League runners-up
Thailand	Diamond Food–Fine Chef	2022–23 Volleyball Thailand League Third Placer
Iraq	South Gas	2021–22 Iraq Premier League champions
Afghanistan	Kam Air	
Chinese Taipei	Taichung Bank	
Hong Kong	Aspiring	2022 VBAHK Cup champions
Mongolia	Bayankhongor Crownd Geo	2022–23 Mongolian Premier League champions
South Korea	Incheon Korean Air Jumbos	2022–23 V-League champions
Australia	Canberra Heat	2022 Australian Volleyball League champions
Indonesia	Jakarta Bhayangkara Presisi	2023 Proliga runners-up
Kuwait	Kuwait SC	
Yemen	Khaypil	

== Venues ==
The tournament was hosted in two venues:

- Issa Bin Rashid Gymnasium Court 1, Manama, Bahrain
- Issa Bin Rashid Gymnasium Court 2, Manama, Bahrain

== Pool standing procedure ==
1. Total number of victories (matches won, matches lost)
2. In the event of a tie, the following first tiebreaker will apply: The teams will be ranked by the most point gained per match as follows:
  - Match won 3–0 or 3–1: 3 points for the winner, 0 points for the loser
  - Match won 3–2: 2 points for the winner, 1 point for the loser
  - Match forfeited: 3 points for the winner, 0 points (0–25, 0–25, 0–25) for the loser
3. If teams are still tied after examining the number of victories and points gained, then the AVC will examine the results in order to break the tie in the following order:
  - Set quotient: if two or more teams are tied on the number of points gained, they will be ranked by the quotient resulting from the division of the number of all set won by the number of all sets lost.
  - Points quotient: if the tie persists based on the set quotient, the teams will be ranked by the quotient resulting from the division of all points scored by the total of points lost during all sets.
  - If the tie persists based on the point quotient, the tie will be broken based on the team that won the match of the Round Robin Phase between the tied teams. When the tie in point quotient is between three or more teams, these teams ranked taking into consideration only the matches involving the teams in question.

== Preliminary round ==
- All times are Arabia Standard Time (UTC+03:00).

=== Pool A ===
Pos	Team	Pld	W	L	Pts	SW	SL	SR	SPW	SPL	SPR	Qualification
1	(Indonesia) Jakarta Bhayangkara Presisi	3	2	1	7	8	4	2.000	277	249	1.112	Pool E
2	(South Korea) Incheon Korean Air Jumbos	3	2	1	6	7	3	2.333	241	208	1.159	Pool E
3	(Bahrain) Al-Ahli	3	2	1	5	6	5	1.200	248	235	1.055	Pool G
4	(Australia) Canberra Heat	3	0	3	0	0	9	0.000	151	225	0.671	Pool G

Date	Time	Venue		Score		Set 1	Set 2	Set 3	Set 4	Set 5	Total	Report
14 May	16:30	Court 2	Canberra Heat	0–3	Incheon Korean Air Jumbos	11–25	21–25	12–25			44–75	Report
14 May	19:00	Court 1	Al-Ahli	3–2	Jakarta Bhayangkara Presisi	26–28	25–23	20–25	25–18	15–6	111–100	Report
15 May	16:30	Court 2	Jakarta Bhayangkara Presisi	3–0	Canberra Heat	25–9	25–23	25–15			75–47	Report
15 May	19:00	Court 1	Al-Ahli	0–3	Incheon Korean Air Jumbos	19–25	21–25	22–25			62–75	Report
16 May	16:30	Court 2	Incheon Korean Air Jumbos	1–3	Jakarta Bhayangkara Presisi	28–30	17–25	25–22	21–25		91–102	Report
16 May	19:00	Court 1	Al-Ahli	3–0	Canberra Heat	25–21	25–19	25–20			75–60	Report

=== Pool B ===
Pos	Team	Pld	W	L	Pts	SW	SL	SR	SPW	SPL	SPR	Qualification
1	(Iran) Shahdab Yazd	3	3	0	9	9	0	MAX	225	162	1.389	Pool F
2	(Iraq) South Gas	3	2	1	6	6	3	2.000	204	184	1.109	Pool F
3	(Chinese Taipei) Taichung Bank	3	1	2	3	3	6	0.500	177	201	0.881	Pool H
4	(Afghanistan) Kam Air	3	0	3	0	0	9	0.000	166	225	0.738	Pool H

Date	Time	Venue		Score		Set 1	Set 2	Set 3	Set 4	Set 5	Total	Report
14 May	11:30	Court 1	Kam Air	0–3	Taichung Bank	21–25	16–25	14–25			51–75	Report
14 May	14:00	Court 2	South Gas	0–3	Shahdab Yazd	22–25	14–25	18–25			54–75	Report
15 May	11:30	Court 1	Kam Air	0–3	Shahdab Yazd	17–25	21–25	18–25			56–75	Report
15 May	14:00	Court 2	Taichung Bank	0–3	South Gas	16–25	20–25	14–25			50–75	Report
16 May	11:30	Court 1	Kam Air	0–3	South Gas	18–25	22–25	19–25			59–75	Report
16 May	14:00	Court 2	Shahdab Yazd	3–0	Taichung Bank	25–13	25–19	25–20			75–52	Report

=== Pool C ===
Pos	Team	Pld	W	L	Pts	SW	SL	SR	SPW	SPL	SPR	Qualification
1	(Japan) Suntory Sunbirds	3	3	0	9	9	1	9.000	243	182	1.335	Pool E
2	(Mongolia) Bayankhongor Crownd Geo	3	1	2	4	6	6	1.000	262	263	0.996	Pool E
3	(Thailand) Diamond Food–Fine Chef	3	1	2	3	3	7	0.429	211	228	0.925	Pool G
4	(Yemen) Khaypil	3	1	2	2	4	8	0.500	245	288	0.851	Pool G

Date	Time	Venue		Score		Set 1	Set 2	Set 3	Set 4	Set 5	Total	Report
14 May	11:30	Court 2	Bayankhongor Crownd Geo	2–3	Khaypil	30–28	17–25	25–20	27–29	15–17	114–119	Report
14 May	16:30	Court 1	Diamond Food–Fine Chef	0–3	Suntory Sunbirds	17–25	24–26	19–25			60–76	Report
15 May	11:30	Court 2	Bayankhongor Crownd Geo	1–3	Suntory Sunbirds	11–25	18–25	25–17	19–25		73–92	Report
15 May	14:00	Court 1	Khaypil	1–3	Diamond Food–Fine Chef	26–24	17–25	13–25	21–25		77–99	Report
16 May	11:30	Court 2	Suntory Sunbirds	3–0	Khaypil	25–17	25–17	25–15			75–49	Report
16 May	14:00	Court 1	Bayankhongor Crownd Geo	3–0	Diamond Food–Fine Chef	25–19	25–18	25–15			75–52	Report

=== Pool D ===
Pos	Team	Pld	W	L	Pts	SW	SL	SR	SPW	SPL	SPR	Qualification
1	(Qatar) Police SC	3	3	0	9	9	1	9.000	247	178	1.388	Pool F
2	Kuwait SC	3	2	1	6	6	4	1.500	202	236	0.856	Pool F
3	(Kazakhstan) Atyrau	3	1	2	3	4	6	0.667	238	221	1.077	Pool H
4	(Hong Kong) Aspiring	3	0	3	0	1	9	0.111	173	225	0.769	Pool H

Date	Time	Venue		Score		Set 1	Set 2	Set 3	Set 4	Set 5	Total	Report
14 May	14:00	Court 1	Police SC	3–1	Atyrau	25–19	25–22	22–25	25–23		97–89	Report
14 May	19:00	Court 2	Aspiring	1–3	Kuwait SC	17–25	25–0	22–25	23–25		87–75	Report
15 May	16:30	Court 1	Police SC	3–0	Kuwait SC	25–17	25–14	25–14			75–45	Report
15 May	19:00	Court 2	Atyrau	3–0	Aspiring	25–11	25–20	25–11			75–42	Report
16 May	16:30	Court 1	Police SC	3–0	Aspiring	25–16	25–6	25–22			75–44	Report
16 May	19:00	Court 2	Kuwait SC	3–0	Atyrau	30–28	27–25	25–21			82–74	Report

According to control committee decision.

== Classification round ==
- All times are Arabia Standard Time (UTC+03:00).
- The results and the points of the matches between the same teams that were already played during the preliminary round shall be taken into account for the classification round.

=== Pool E ===
Pos	Team	Pld	W	L	Pts	SW	SL	SR	SPW	SPL	SPR	Qualification
1	(Japan) Suntory Sunbirds	3	3	0	9	9	1	9.000	244	190	1.284	Semifinals
2	(Indonesia) Jakarta Bhayangkara Presisi	3	2	1	6	6	4	1.500	235	216	1.088	Semifinals
3	(South Korea) Incheon Korean Air Jumbos	3	1	2	3	4	7	0.571	247	258	0.957	5th–8th semifinals
4	(Mongolia) Bayankhongor Crownd Geo	3	0	3	0	2	9	0.222	202	264	0.765	5th–8th semifinals

Date	Time	Venue		Score		Set 1	Set 2	Set 3	Set 4	Set 5	Total	Report
18 May	11:30	Court 1	Jakarta Bhayangkara Presisi	3–0	Bayankhongor Crownd Geo	25–19	25–15	25–14			75–48	Report
18 May	11:30	Court 2	Incheon Korean Air Jumbos	0–3	Suntory Sunbirds	21–25	19–25	19–25			59–75	Report
19 May	11:30	Court 1	Incheon Korean Air Jumbos	3–1	Bayankhongor Crownd Geo	25–21	22–25	25–16	25–19		97–81	Report
19 May	14:00	Court 1	Jakarta Bhayangkara Presisi	0–3	Suntory Sunbirds	25–27	15–25	18–25			58–77	Report

=== Pool F ===
Pos	Team	Pld	W	L	Pts	SW	SL	SR	SPW	SPL	SPR	Qualification
1	(Qatar) Police SC	3	3	0	8	9	2	4.500	259	211	1.227	Semifinals
2	(Iran) Shahdab Yazd	3	2	1	7	8	3	2.667	255	222	1.149	Semifinals
3	(Iraq) South Gas	3	1	2	3	3	6	0.500	190	211	0.900	5th–8th semifinals
4	Kuwait SC	3	0	3	0	0	9	0.000	165	225	0.733	5th–8th semifinals

Date	Time	Venue		Score		Set 1	Set 2	Set 3	Set 4	Set 5	Total	Report
18 May	16:30	Court 1	South Gas	0–3	Police SC	21–25	17–25	23–25			61–75	Report
18 May	16:30	Court 2	Shahdab Yazd	3–0	Kuwait SC	25–16	25–20	25–23			75–59	Report
19 May	11:30	Court 2	South Gas	3–0	Kuwait SC	25–21	25–21	25–19			75–61	Report
19 May	16:30	Court 1	Shahdab Yazd	2–3	Police SC	20–25	25–22	25–22	23–25	12–15	105–109	Report

=== Pool G ===
Pos	Team	Pld	W	L	Pts	SW	SL	SR	SPW	SPL	SPR	Qualification
1	(Bahrain) Al-Ahli	3	3	0	9	9	0	MAX	237	194	1.222	9th–12th semifinals
2	(Australia) Canberra Heat	3	2	1	6	6	5	1.200	250	253	0.988	9th–12th semifinals
3	(Thailand) Diamond Food–Fine Chef	3	1	2	3	4	7	0.571	257	251	1.024	13th–16th semifinals
4	(Yemen) Khaypil	3	0	3	0	2	9	0.222	231	277	0.834	13th–16th semifinals

Date	Time	Venue		Score		Set 1	Set 2	Set 3	Set 4	Set 5	Total	Report
18 May	14:00	Court 1	Canberra Heat	3–1	Diamond Food–Fine Chef	28–26	21–25	25–23	25–22		99–96	Report
18 May	19:00	Court 1	Al-Ahli	3–0	Khaypil	25–20	37–35	25–17			87–72	Report
19 May	16:30	Court 2	Canberra Heat	3–1	Khaypil	25–18	16–25	25–16	25–23		91–82	Report
19 May	19:00	Court 1	Al-Ahli	3–0	Diamond Food–Fine Chef	25–19	25–23	25–20			75–62	Report

=== Pool H ===
Pos	Team	Pld	W	L	Pts	SW	SL	SR	SPW	SPL	SPR	Qualification
1	(Kazakhstan) Atyrau	3	3	0	9	9	2	4.500	284	232	1.224	9th–12th semifinals
2	(Chinese Taipei) Taichung Bank	3	2	1	6	7	3	2.333	257	211	1.218	9th–12th semifinals
3	(Afghanistan) Kam Air	3	1	2	3	4	6	0.667	209	225	0.929	13th–16th semifinals
4	(Hong Kong) Aspiring	3	0	3	0	0	9	0.000	143	225	0.636	13th–16th semifinals

Date	Time	Venue		Score		Set 1	Set 2	Set 3	Set 4	Set 5	Total	Report
18 May	14:00	Court 2	Taichung Bank	3–0	Aspiring	25–16	25–19	25–14			75–49	Report
18 May	19:00	Court 2	Kam Air	1–3	Atyrau	16–25	25–23	23–25	19–25		83–98	Report
19 May	14:00	Court 2	Kam Air	3–0	Aspiring	25–23	25–17	25–12			75–52	Report
19 May	19:00	Court 2	Taichung Bank	1–3	Atyrau	33–35	25–20	20–25	29–31		107–111	Report

== Final round ==
- All times are Arabia Standard Time (UTC+03:00).

=== 13th–16th places ===
13th–16th semifinals
20 May
(Thailand) Diamond Food–Fine Chef	3
(Hong Kong) Aspiring	0
20 May
(Yemen) Khaypil	0
(Afghanistan) Kam Air	3

13th place match
21 May
(Thailand) Diamond Food–Fine Chef	3
(Afghanistan) Kam Air	0
15th place match
21 May
(Hong Kong) Aspiring	2
(Yemen) Khaypil	3

==== 13th–16th semifinals ====
Date	Time	Venue		Score		Set 1	Set 2	Set 3	Set 4	Set 5	Total	Report
20 May	11:30	Court 2	Khaypil	0–3	Kam Air	17–25	21–25	22–25			60–75	Report
20 May	14:00	Court 2	Diamond Food–Fine Chef	3–0	Aspiring	25–10	27–25	25–18			77–53	Report

==== 15th place match ====
Date	Time	Venue		Score		Set 1	Set 2	Set 3	Set 4	Set 5	Total	Report
21 May	10:00	Court 2	Aspiring	2–3	Khaypil	25–22	33–31	14–25	23–25	20–22	115–125	Report

==== 13th place match ====
Date	Time	Venue		Score		Set 1	Set 2	Set 3	Set 4	Set 5	Total	Report
21 May	15:00	Court 2	Diamond Food–Fine Chef	3–0	Kam Air	27–25	25–21	25–20			77–66	Report

=== 9th–12th places ===
9th–12th semifinals
20 May
(Bahrain) Al-Ahli	3
(Chinese Taipei) Taichung Bank	0
20 May
(Australia) Canberra Heat	0
(Kazakhstan) Atyrau	3

9th place match
21 May
(Bahrain) Al-Ahli	3
(Kazakhstan) Atyrau	2
11th place match
21 May
(Chinese Taipei) Taichung Bank	3
(Australia) Canberra Heat	0

==== 9th–12th semifinals ====
Date	Time	Venue		Score		Set 1	Set 2	Set 3	Set 4	Set 5	Total	Report
20 May	16:30	Court 2	Al-Ahli	3–0	Taichung Bank	25–21	26–24	25–21			76–66	Report
20 May	19:00	Court 2	Canberra Heat	0–3	Atyrau	20–25	14–25	17–25			51–75	Report

==== 11th place match ====
Date	Time	Venue		Score		Set 1	Set 2	Set 3	Set 4	Set 5	Total	Report
21 May	12:30	Court 2	Taichung Bank	3–0	Canberra Heat	25–22	25–20	28–26			78–68	Report

==== 9th place match ====
Date	Time	Venue		Score		Set 1	Set 2	Set 3	Set 4	Set 5	Total	Report
21 May	17:30	Court 2	Al-Ahli	3–2	Atyrau	25–17	21–25	25–15	21–25	15–11	107–93	Report

=== 5th–8th places ===
5th–8th semifinals
20 May
(South Korea) Incheon Korean Air Jumbos	1
Kuwait SC	3
20 May
(Mongolia) Bayankhongor Crownd Geo	0
(Iraq) South Gas	3

5th place match
21 May
Kuwait SC	3
(Iraq) South Gas	2
7th place match
21 May
(South Korea) Incheon Korean Air Jumbos	3
(Mongolia) Bayankhongor Crownd Geo	0

==== 5th–8th semifinals ====
Date	Time	Venue		Score		Set 1	Set 2	Set 3	Set 4	Set 5	Total	Report
20 May	11:30	Court 1	Incheon Korean Air Jumbos	1–3	Kuwait SC	26–28	25–21	32–34	23–25		106–108	Report
20 May	14:00	Court 1	Bayankhongor Crownd Geo	0–3	South Gas	21–25	17–25	16–25			54–75	Report

==== 7th place match ====
Date	Time	Venue		Score		Set 1	Set 2	Set 3	Set 4	Set 5	Total	Report
21 May	11:30	Court 1	Incheon Korean Air Jumbos	3–0	Bayankhongor Crownd Geo	25–21	25–23	25–18			75–62	Report

==== 5th place match ====
Date	Time	Venue		Score		Set 1	Set 2	Set 3	Set 4	Set 5	Total	Report
21 May	14:00	Court 1	Kuwait SC	3–2	South Gas	23–25	29–27	15–25	25–18	15–11	107–106	Report

=== Final four ===
Semifinals
20 May
(Japan) Suntory Sunbirds	3
(Iran) Shahdab Yazd	1
20 May
(Indonesia) Jakarta Bhayangkara Presisi	3
(Qatar) Police SC	1

Final
21 May
(Japan) Suntory Sunbirds	3
(Indonesia) Jakarta Bhayangkara Presisi	1
3rd place match
21 May
(Iran) Shahdab Yazd	1
(Qatar) Police SC	3

==== Semifinals ====
Date	Time	Venue		Score		Set 1	Set 2	Set 3	Set 4	Set 5	Total	Report
20 May	16:30	Court 1	Suntory Sunbirds	3–1	Shahdab Yazd	25–22	23–25	34–32	25–17		107–96	Report
20 May	19:00	Court 1	Jakarta Bhayangkara Presisi	3–1	Police SC	11–25	29–27	25–23	25–23		90–98	Report

==== 3rd place match ====
Date	Time	Venue		Score		Set 1	Set 2	Set 3	Set 4	Set 5	Total	Report
21 May	16:30	Court 1	Shahdab Yazd	1–3	Police SC	26–24	16–25	20–25	19–25		81–99	Report

==== Final ====
Date	Time	Venue		Score		Set 1	Set 2	Set 3	Set 4	Set 5	Total	Report
21 May	19:00	Court 1	Suntory Sunbirds	3–1	Jakarta Bhayangkara Presisi	28–26	25–23	23–25	25–17		101–91	Report

== Final standing ==
Rank	Team
1st place, gold medalist(s)	(Japan) Suntory Sunbirds
2nd place, silver medalist(s)	(Indonesia) Jakarta Bhayangkara Presisi
3rd place, bronze medalist(s)	(Qatar) Police SC
4	(Iran) Shahdab Yazd
5	Kuwait SC
6	(Iraq) South Gas
7	(South Korea) Incheon Korean Air Jumbos
8	(Mongolia) Bayankhongor Crownd Geo
9	(Bahrain) Al-Ahli
10	(Kazakhstan) Atyrau
11	(Chinese Taipei) Taichung Bank
12	(Australia) Canberra Heat
13	(Thailand) Diamond Food–Fine Chef
14	(Afghanistan) Kam Air
15	(Yemen) Khaypil
16	(Hong Kong) Aspiring

Qualified for the 2023 Club World Championship

2023 Asian Men's Club Champions
(Japan)
Suntory Sunbirds
1st title

14–man roster
Atomo Torikai, Ryu Yamamoto, Peng Shikun, Alain De Armas, Soshi Fujinaka, Masaki Oya (c), Kenya Fujinaka, Kosuke Hata, Kenji Sato, Dmitry Muserskiy, Yoshimitsu Kiire, Hirohito Kashimura, Hiroki Nishida, Kenshin Kuwada.
Head coach
Kota Yamamura

== Awards ==
- Most Valuable Player

Dmitry Muserskiy (RUS) (Suntory Sunbirds)

- Best Setter

Masaki Oya (JPN) (Suntory Sunbirds)

- Best Outside Spikers

Alain De Armas (CUB) (Suntory Sunbirds)
Mohammad Javad Manavinejad (IRI) (Jakarta Bhayangkara Presisi)

- Best Middle Blockers

Belal Nabel Abunabot (QAT) (Police SC)
Hendra Kurniawan (INA) (Jakarta Bhayangkara Presisi)

- Best Opposite Spiker

Amir Ghafour (IRI) (Shahdab Yazd)

- Best Libero

Fahreza Rakha Abhinaya (INA) (Jakarta Bhayangkara Presisi)

== Broadcasting ==
Matches in the second hall of Issa Bin Rashid Gymnasium is live streaming through AVC YouTube, while the TV right holders play in the main competition hall to receive the uplink for their respective territory.

== See also ==
- 2023 Asian Women's Club Volleyball Championship
