= Armin Afshin Far =

Iranian volleyball player (born 1998)

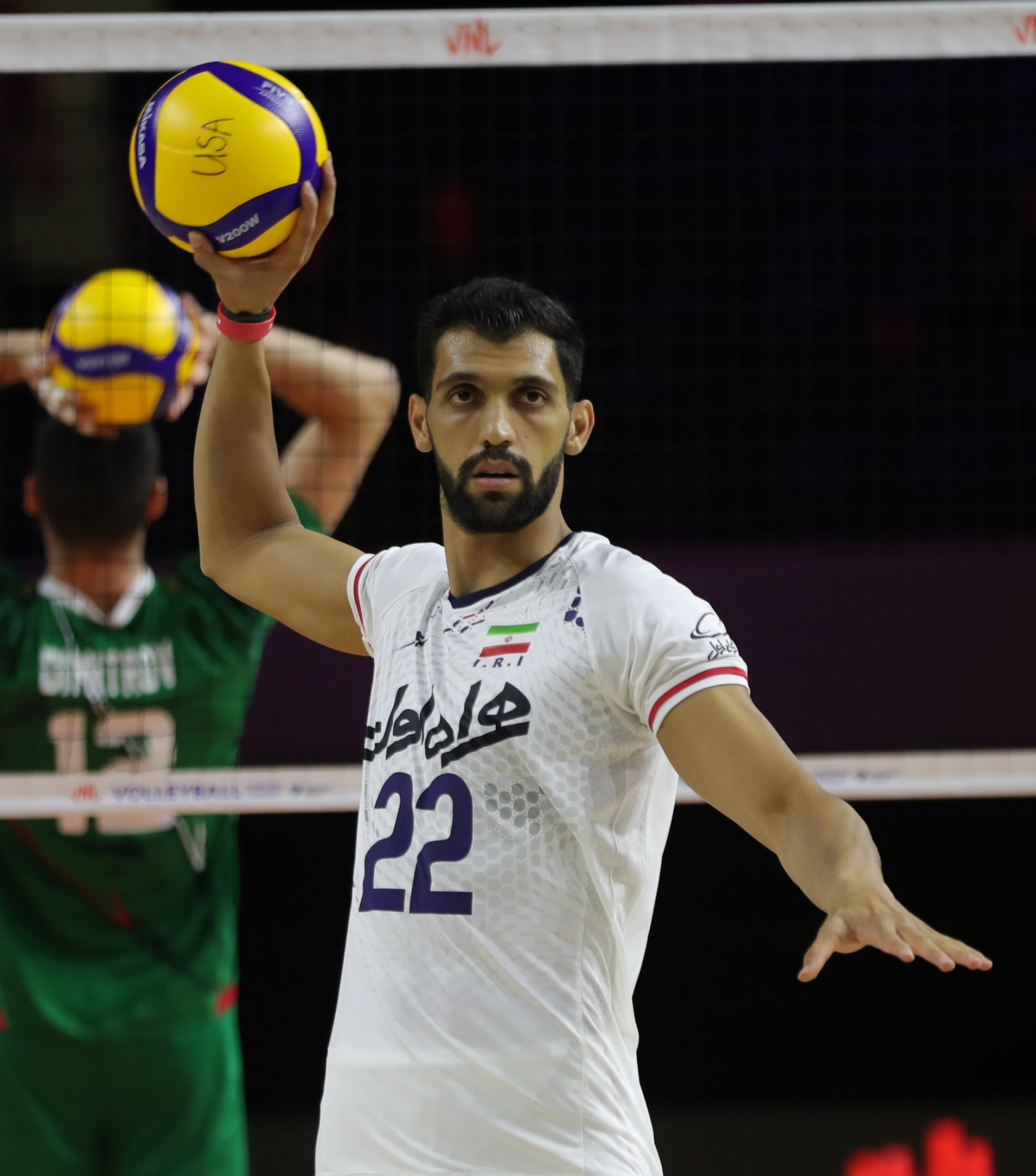

Personal information
- Full name: Armin Afshin Far
- Born: April 10, 1998 (age 28); Tehran, Iran
- Height: 1.91 m (6 ft 3 in)
- Weight: 92 kg (203 lb)
- Spike: 3.45 m (136 in)
- Block: 3.35 m (132 in)

Volleyball information
- Position: Outside Hitter
- Current club: Guangdong Taishan

Career
Years	Teams
2016; 2017; 2018; 2019; 2020; 2021; 2022; 2023; 2024; 2024–2025; 2025; 2025–2026; 2026–	(Iran) Paresh Tehran (Iran) Shahrdari Varamin (Iran) Oghab Tehran (Iran) Khatam Ardakan (Iran) Paykan Tehran (Iran) Paykan Tehran (Iran) Paykan Tehran (Turkey) Cizre Belediyespor (Indonesia) Palembang Bank Sumsel Babel (Turkey) İstanbul GSK (Vietnam) Ho Chi Minh City (France) Stade Poitevin Poitiers (China) Guangdong Taishan

Armin Afshin Far (Persian: آرمین افشین فر, born April 10, 1998) is an Iranian volleyball player who plays for Guangdong Taishan. and Iran men's national volleyball team.

== Career ==
He has also been in Peykan Tehran team.
