= Daudi Okello =

Ugandan volleyball player (born 1995)

Personal information
- Nationality: (Uganda) Ugandan
- Born: 20 September 1995 (age 31)
- Height: 2.01 m (6 ft 7 in)
- Weight: 92 kg (203 lb)

Volleyball information
- Position: Opposite
- Current club: (Indonesia) Jakarta Bhayangkara Presisi
- Number: 4

Career
Years	Teams
2016–2017; 2017–2018; 2018–2019; 2019–2020; 2020–2021; 2021–2023; 2023–	(Bulgaria) VC Marek Union-Ivkoni (Turkey) Galatasaray Istanbul (Turkey) Tokat Belediye Plevnespor (Turkey) Spor Toto Spor Kulübü (South Korea) Cheonan Hyundai Skywalkers (South Korea) Suwon KEPCO Vixtorm (Indonesia) Jakarta Bhayangkara Presisi

National team
Uganda

Daudi Okello (born 20 September 1995) is a Ugandan volleyball player who has played in Bulgaria, Turkey, South Korea and Indonesia.

He currently plays for Suwon KEPCO Vixtorm in the Korean V-League.
