= 2022 Asian Men's Club Volleyball Championship =

International volleyball competition

- Official logo

Tournament details
- Host country: Iran
- City: Tehran
- Dates: 14–20 May
- Teams: 8 (from 1 confederation)
- Venue: 1 (in 1 host city)

Final positions
- Champions: (Iran) Paykan Tehran (8th title)
- Runners-up: (Japan) Suntory Sunbirds
- Third place: (Iran) Shahdab Yazd
- Fourth place: (Kazakhstan) Taraz

Tournament awards
- MVP: (Iran) Saeid Marouf
- Best Setter: (Iran) Saeid Marouf
- Best OH: (Japan) Masahiro Yanagida (France) Earvin N'Gapeth
- Best MB: (Iran) Mohammad Mousavi (Kazakhstan) Nodirkhan Kadirkhanov
- Best OPP: (Russia) Dmitriy Muserskiy
- Best Libero: (Iran) Mohammed Reza Moazzen

The 2022 Asian Men's Club Volleyball Championship was the 22nd edition of the Asian Men's Club Volleyball Championship, an annual international men's volleyball club tournament organized by the Asian Volleyball Confederation (AVC) with Islamic Republic of Iran Volleyball Federation (I.R.I.V.F.).

The tournament was held in Tehran, Iran, from 14 to 20 May 2022. The champions qualified for the 2022 FIVB Volleyball Men's Club World Championship.

== Qualification ==
Following the AVC regulations, the maximum of 16 teams in all AVC events will be selected by:

- 1 team for the host country
- 10 teams based on the final standing of the previous edition
- 5 teams from each of 5 zones (with a qualification tournament if needed)

Due to anticipated difficulty for national federations to field teams due to the COVID-19 pandemic, the AVC allowed two clubs from the same national federation to participate in the case that there are less than 8 federations enter the tournament. In the case of less than 16 entrants, Iran as host country is entitled to enter two teams. Their two berths are credited to have been attained as host nation and champions in the 2021 championships.

=== Qualified associations ===
Event(s)		Dates	Location	Berths	Qualifier(s)
Host Country		—N/a	—N/a	1	(Iran) Iran^{A}
2021 Asian Championship		8–15 October 2021	(Thailand) Nakhon Ratchasima	5	(Iran) Iran^{A} Qatar; Kazakhstan; Thailand (Iraq) Iraq^{B} ~~Kuwait~~; ~~Uzbekistan~~^{C} ~~Philippines~~^{D} ~~Sri Lanka~~
Direct zonal wildcards	East Asia	No later than 15 January 2022	(Thailand) Bangkok	1	Japan
Direct zonal wildcards	West Asia	No later than 15 January 2022	(Thailand) Bangkok	1	(Iraq) Iraq^{B}
Total				8	

^A Iran as host country is entitled to enter two teams if there are less than 16 entrants.
^B Iraq is entitled to enter two teams if there are less than 8 federations enter the tournament.
^C The Uzbekistan Volleyball Federation decided to withdraw their team from the competition.
^D The PNVF decided to withdraw the Dasma Monarchs due to training of the Philippines volleyball team in Qatar for the 2021 Southeast Asian Games.

== Participating teams ==
The following teams participated for the tournament.

Association	Team	Domestic league standing
Iran	Paykan Tehran	2021–22 Iranian Volleyball Super League runners–up
Iran	Shahdab Yazd	2021–22 Iranian Volleyball Super League champions
Qatar	Al Rayyan	2021–22 Qatari Volleyball League champions
Kazakhstan	Taraz	
Thailand	Nakhon Ratchasima QminC	2020–21 Men's Volleyball Thailand League champions
Iraq	Erbil	
Iraq	South Gas	
Japan	Suntory Sunbirds	2020–21 V.League Division 1 Men's champions

== Venues ==
The tournament will be host in Azadi Indoor Stadium, located in Tehran, Iran.

All matches
Tehran is located in Iran	Tehran, Iran
Tehran is located in Iran	Azadi Indoor Stadium
Tehran is located in Iran	Capacity: 12,000

== Pool standing procedure ==
1. Total number of victories (matches won, matches lost)
2. In the event of a tie, the following first tiebreaker will apply: The teams will be ranked by the most point gained per match as follows:
  - Match won 3–0 or 3–1: 3 points for the winner, 0 points for the loser
  - Match won 3–2: 2 points for the winner, 1 point for the loser
  - Match forfeited: 3 points for the winner, 0 points (0–25, 0–25, 0–25) for the loser
3. If teams are still tied after examining the number of victories and points gained, then the AVC will examine the results in order to break the tie in the following order:
  - Set quotient: if two or more teams are tied on the number of points gained, they will be ranked by the quotient resulting from the division of the number of all set won by the number of all sets lost.
  - Points quotient: if the tie persists based on the set quotient, the teams will be ranked by the quotient resulting from the division of all points scored by the total of points lost during all sets.
  - If the tie persists based on the point quotient, the tie will be broken based on the team that won the match of the Round Robin Phase between the tied teams. When the tie in point quotient is between three or more teams, these teams ranked taking into consideration only the matches involving the teams in question.

== Preliminary round ==
- All times are Iran Daylight Time (UTC+04:30).

=== Pool A ===
Pos	Team	Pld	W	L	Pts	SW	SL	SR	SPW	SPL	SPR	Qualification
1	(Iran) Paykan Tehran	3	3	0	9	9	2	4.500	270	208	1.298	Quarterfinals
2	(Japan) Suntory Sunbirds	3	2	1	6	7	3	2.333	234	214	1.093	Quarterfinals
3	(Thailand) Nakhon Ratchasima QminC	3	1	2	3	4	7	0.571	232	259	0.896	Quarterfinals
4	(Iraq) South Gas	3	0	3	0	1	9	0.111	192	247	0.777	Quarterfinals

Date	Time		Score		Set 1	Set 2	Set 3	Set 4	Set 5	Total	Report
14 May	10:00	Suntory Sunbirds (Japan)	3–0	(Thailand) Nakhon Ratchasima QminC	25–19	25–21	25–16			75–56	Report
14 May	16:00	Paykan Tehran (Iran)	3–0	(Iraq) South Gas	25–14	25–17	25–14			75–45	Report
15 May	10:00	Nakhon Ratchasima QminC (Thailand)	3–1	(Iraq) South Gas	22–25	25–17	25–22	25–22		97–86	Report
15 May	16:00	Suntory Sunbirds (Japan)	1–3	(Iran) Paykan Tehran	25–22	19–25	19–25	21–25		84–97	Report
16 May	10:00	South Gas (Iraq)	0–3	(Japan) Suntory Sunbirds	17–25	23–25	21–25			61–75	Report
16 May	16:00	Paykan Tehran (Iran)	3–1	(Thailand) Nakhon Ratchasima QminC	25–23	23–25	25–18	25–13		98–79	Report

=== Pool B ===
Pos	Team	Pld	W	L	Pts	SW	SL	SR	SPW	SPL	SPR	Qualification
1	(Iran) Shahdab Yazd	3	3	0	9	9	1	9.000	247	184	1.342	Quarterfinals
2	(Kazakhstan) Taraz	3	2	1	5	7	5	1.400	263	239	1.100	Quarterfinals
3	(Qatar) Al Rayyan	3	1	2	4	5	7	0.714	245	261	0.939	Quarterfinals
4	(Iraq) Erbil	3	0	3	0	1	9	0.111	175	246	0.711	Quarterfinals

Date	Time		Score		Set 1	Set 2	Set 3	Set 4	Set 5	Total	Report
14 May	13:00	Al Rayyan (Qatar)	2–3	(Kazakhstan) Taraz	25–23	15–25	23–25	25–21	10–15	98–109	Report
14 May	19:00	Shahdab Yazd (Iran)	3–0	(Iraq) Erbil	25–16	25–18	25–20			75–54	Report
15 May	13:00	Taraz (Kazakhstan)	3–0	(Iraq) Erbil	25–13	25–20	25–11			75–44	Report
15 May	19:00	Al Rayyan (Qatar)	0–3	(Iran) Shahdab Yazd	20–25	17–25	14–25			51–75	Report
16 May	13:00	Erbil (Iraq)	1–3	(Qatar) Al Rayyan	25–21	14–25	21–25	17–25		77–96	Report
16 May	19:00	Shahdab Yazd (Iran)	3–1	(Kazakhstan) Taraz	25–16	25–21	22–25	25–17		97–79	Report

== Final round ==
- All times are Iran Daylight Time (UTC+04:30).

=== Brackets ===
Quarterfinals
18 May
(Iran) Paykan Tehran	3
(Iraq) Erbil	0
18 May
(Kazakhstan) Taraz	3
(Thailand) Nakhon Ratchasima QminC	1
18 May
(Japan) Suntory Sunbirds	3
(Qatar) Al Rayyan	0
18 May
(Iran) Shahdab Yazd	3
(Iraq) South Gas	0

Semifinals
19 May
(Iran) Paykan Tehran	3
(Kazakhstan) Taraz	1
19 May
(Japan) Suntory Sunbirds	3
(Iran) Shahdab Yazd	1

Final
20 May
(Iran) Paykan Tehran	3
(Japan) Suntory Sunbirds	2
3rd place match
20 May
(Kazakhstan) Taraz	0
(Iran) Shahdab Yazd	3

5th–8th semifinals
19 May
(Iraq) Erbil	1
(Thailand) Nakhon Ratchasima QminC	3
19 May
(Qatar) Al Rayyan	3
(Iraq) South Gas	1

5th place match
20 May
(Thailand) Nakhon Ratchasima QminC	1
(Qatar) Al Rayyan	3
7th place match
20 May
(Iraq) Erbil	2
(Iraq) South Gas	3

=== Quarterfinals ===
Date	Time		Score		Set 1	Set 2	Set 3	Set 4	Set 5	Total	Report
18 May	10:00	Taraz (Kazakhstan)	3–1	(Thailand) Nakhon Ratchasima QminC	25–15	22–25	25–17	25–18		97–75	Report
18 May	13:00	Suntory Sunbirds (Japan)	3–0	(Qatar) Al Rayyan	25–20	25–20	25–22			75–62	Report
18 May	16:00	Paykan Tehran (Iran)	3–0	(Iraq) Erbil	25–13	25–19	25–14			75–46	Report
18 May	19:00	Shahdab Yazd (Iran)	3–0	(Iraq) South Gas	25–22	25–19	25–18			75–59	Report

=== 5th–8th semifinals ===
Date	Time		Score		Set 1	Set 2	Set 3	Set 4	Set 5	Total	Report
19 May	10:00	Erbil (Iraq)	1–3	(Thailand) Nakhon Ratchasima QminC	17–25	13–25	25–22	18–25		73–97	Report
19 May	13:00	Al Rayyan (Qatar)	3–1	(Iraq) South Gas	25–17	22–25	25–20	25–20		97–82	Report

=== Semifinals ===
Date	Time		Score		Set 1	Set 2	Set 3	Set 4	Set 5	Total	Report
19 May	16:00	Paykan Tehran (Iran)	3–1	(Kazakhstan) Taraz	34–36	25–17	25–21	25–17		109–91	Report
19 May	19:00	Suntory Sunbirds (Japan)	3–1	(Iran) Shahdab Yazd	22–25	25–22	25–20	25–21		97–88	Report

=== 7th place match ===
Date	Time		Score		Set 1	Set 2	Set 3	Set 4	Set 5	Total	Report
20 May	09:30	Erbil (Iraq)	2–3	(Iraq) South Gas	25–17	16–25	22–25	25–20	12–15	100–102	Report

=== 5th place match ===
Date	Time		Score		Set 1	Set 2	Set 3	Set 4	Set 5	Total	Report
20 May	12:30	Nakhon Ratchasima QminC (Thailand)	1–3	(Qatar) Al Rayyan	25–23	16–25	20–25	18–25		79–98	Report

=== 3rd place match ===
Date	Time		Score		Set 1	Set 2	Set 3	Set 4	Set 5	Total	Report
20 May	15:30	Taraz (Kazakhstan)	0–3	(Iran) Shahdab Yazd	20–25	15–25	22–25			57–75	Report

=== Final ===
Date	Time		Score		Set 1	Set 2	Set 3	Set 4	Set 5	Total	Report
20 May	18:30	Paykan Tehran (Iran)	3–2	(Japan) Suntory Sunbirds	21–25	26–28	25–13	25–20	15–12	112–98	Report

== Final standing ==
Rank	Team
1st place, gold medalist(s)	(Iran) Paykan Tehran
2nd place, silver medalist(s)	(Japan) Suntory Sunbirds
3rd place, bronze medalist(s)	(Iran) Shahdab Yazd
4	(Kazakhstan) Taraz
5	(Qatar) Al Rayyan
6	(Thailand) Nakhon Ratchasima QminC
7	(Iraq) South Gas
8	(Iraq) Erbil

Qualified for the 2022 Club World Championship

2022 Asian Men's Club Champions
(Iran)
Paykan Tehran
8th title

14–man roster
Saeid Marouf (c), Mohammad Taher Vadi, Nimir Abdel-Aziz, Porya Yali, Hamzeh Zarini, Earvin N'Gapeth, Armin Afshin Far, Pourya Fayazi, Seyed Mohammad Mousavi, Armin Tashakori, Ali Shafiei, Mohammad Reza Hazratpour
Head coach
Peyman Akbari

== Awards ==
- Most Valuable Player
  Saeid Marouf (IRI) (Paykan Tehran)
- Best Setter
  Saeid Marouf (IRI) (Paykan Tehran)
- Best Outside Spikers
  Masahiro Yanagida (JPN) (Suntory Sunbirds)
  Earvin N'Gapeth (FRA) (Paykan Tehran)
- Best Middle Blockers
  Mohammad Mousavi (IRI) (Paykan Tehran)
  Nodirkhan Kadirkhanov (KAZ) (Taraz)
- Best Opposite Spiker
  Dmitriy Muserskiy (RUS) (Suntory Sunbirds)
- Best Libero
  Mohammed Reza Moazzen (IRI) (Shahdab Yazd)

== See also ==
- 2022 Asian Women's Club Volleyball Championship
