= Rita Subowo =

Indonesian sport executive

- Born: 27 July 1948 (age 78); Yogyakarta, Indonesia
- Education: University of Indonesia
- Spouse: Subowo Atmosardjono

Rita Subowo is an Indonesian sports organization figure and the first woman to serve as general chairman of the Indonesian Volleyball Federation (2000–2005) general chairman of the National Sports Committee of Indonesia for the period (2007-2011) concurrently serving as General Chair of the Indonesian Olympic Committee (2007–2015) and President of Asian Volleyball Confederation (2020-2024)

== Early life ==
This woman's journey began in 1987. at that time, she became the manager of the Indonesian Volleyball National Team at the Southeast Asian Games championship in Jakarta. She later became the caretaker of the Volleyball Organization. Under Rita's cold hands, this sport has improved. Under Rita's cold hands, this sport experienced an increase, so that in 2000, She began to be entrusted with holding the reins of General Chair of the Indonesian Volleyball Federation (PBVSI).

In 2005, KOI (Indonesian Olympic Committee) was formed as a separate entity from KONI (National Sports Committee of Indonesia). KOI is responsible as Indonesian National Olympic Committee, to organise Indonesian participation in international sporting events, such as Olympic Games, Asian Games, Southeast Asian Games, etc. The KONI and KOI separation was based according to Act No. 3 of 2005 on National Sport System, and further enforced with Government Regulation No. 17 of 2007 about the organizing of sporting events.

At the time of the enactment of a new regulation that separated the Indonesian sports federation which was originally one into two, namely KONI and KOI. It was here that Rita was entrusted with being the secretary general of the KONI. She played a role as a mediator between KONI and KOI so that they could function according to their functions according to the new law. Two years later, he was entrusted with serving as chairman of the KONI and KOI simultaneously, which in the end the two Indonesian sports federation organizations were running according to their functions
