= Petar Premović =

Serbian volleyball player (born 1994)

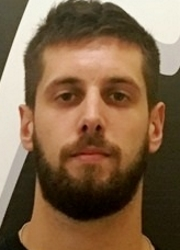

Personal information
- Nationality: Serbian
- Born: 12 September 1994 (age 32) Raška, Serbia
- Height: 2.00 m (6 ft 7 in)

Volleyball information
- Position: Opposite

Career
- Years: Team
- 2011–2015 2015–2017 2017–2019 2019–2021 2021–2022 2022 2022–2023 2023–2024 2024-2026 2026: (Serbia) OK Radnički Kragujevac (Serbia) OK Vojvodina (Italy) Pallavolo Padova (Japan) FC Tokyo (United Arab Emirates) Al Ain (Bulgaria) Hebar Pazardzhik (Indonesia) Jakarta BNI 46 (Russia) ASK Nizhny Novgorod (Romania) CS Dinamo București (Argentina) UPCN Vóley Club

National team
- Years: Team
- 2015–: Serbia

Petar Premović (born September 12, 1994) is a Serbian volleyball player, a member of the Argentine club UPCN Vóley Club.

== Sporting achievements ==
=== Clubs ===
Divizia A1 (men's volleyball):

- 2024/2025
- 2025/2026

Bulgarian Super Cup:

- 2022/2023

UAE Vice Presidents Cup:

- 2021/2022

Emperor's Cup:

- 2020/2021

Champion of Serbia:

- 2017
- 2016
- 2012, 2013

Serbian Super Cup:

- 2015
