= VM Jakarta Elektrik PLN =

Sports Club

Jakarta Elektrik PLN
- Founded: 2004
- Ground: Jakarta
- Chairman: Danni Irawan
- League: Proliga

Jakarta Elektrik PLN is an Indonesian men's volleyball club owned and managed by the Perusahaan Listrik Negara that plays at the Proliga. The club won the 2015 Proliga championship.

== Honours ==
Proliga
- Champions (1): 2015
