= Jakarta Bhayangkara Presisi =

Indonesian men's volleyball team

- 2026 AVC Men's Volleyball Champions League
- Full name: Jakarta Bhayangkara Presisi Volleyball Club
- Short name: JBP
- Founded: 2022; 4 years ago
- Ground: Padepokan Voli Jenderal Polisi Kunarto; Bogor, Indonesia (Capacity: 500)
- Owner: Indonesian National Police
- Chairman: -
- Head coach: Reidel Toiran
- Captain: Nizar Julfikar
- League: Proliga
- 2026: Regular season: 2nd Post season: Runners-up
- Website: Club home page
- Championships: Proliga Champion

Uniforms
Home	Away

Jakarta Bhayangkara Presisi is an Indonesian professional volleyball team founded in 2022. They are based in Jakarta and are members of the Indonesian Volleyball Federation (PBVSI). Their home arena is Padepokan Voli Jenderal Polisi Kunarto in Bogor.

On 17 May 2026, Jakarta Bhayangkara Presisi became the first Indonesian club to win the AVC Men's Volleyball Champions League, defeating Foolad Sirjan Iranian 3–1 (25–20, 24–26, 25–23, 25–23) in the final held in Pontianak, West Kalimantan. The victory also secured the club's berth in the 2026 FIVB Volleyball Men's Club World Championship, making them the first Indonesian club to qualify for the tournament.

== Honours ==
AVC Men's Volleyball Champions League

- Champions (1): 2026
- Runners-up (1): 2023
- Third Place (1): 2024

Proliga

- Champions (2): 2024, 2025
- Runners-up (2): 2023, 2026

== Season-by-season records ==
Proliga
Season	Postseason	Regular season				
Season	Postseason	Rank	Games	Wins	Loss	Points
2023	Runners-up	3	14	11	3	31
2024	Champions	4	12	8	4	22
2025	Champions	2	8	6	2	18
2026	Runners-up	2				

AVC Men's Volleyball Champions League
Season	Round	Result	Notes
2023	Final	Runners-up	Lost to (Japan) Suntory Sunbirds
2024	3rd place match	3rd place	
2026	Final	Champions	def. (Iran) Foolad Sirjan Iranian 3–1

== Players ==
=== 2026 AVC Men's Volleyball Champions League roster ===
Number	Name	Birthdate	Position
7	(Indonesia) Yuda Mardiansyah Putra	22 June 1996 (age 30)	Middle blocker
8	(Indonesia) Hernanda Zulfi	27 January 1997 (age 29)	Middle blocker
9	(Mali) Noumory Keita	26 June 2001 (age 25)	Opposite
10	(Indonesia) Raden Ahmad Gumilar	21 March 2003 (age 23)	Middle blocker
11	(Indonesia) Rendy Febriant Tamamilang	12 February 1996 (age 30)	Outside hitter
13	(Cuba) Robertlandy Simon	11 June 1987 (age 39)	Middle blocker
14	(Indonesia) Henry Ade Novian	12 November 1998 (age 27)	Libero
16	(Indonesia) Alfin Daniel Pratama	2 May 2002 (age 24)	Setter
19	(Slovenia) Rok Možič	17 January 2002 (age 24)	Outside hitter
24	(Indonesia) Agil Angga Anggara	15 May 2000 (age 26)	Outside hitter
26	(Indonesia) Farhan Halim	26 April 2001 (age 25)	Outside hitter
28	(Indonesia) Arjuna Mahendra	26 January 2002 (age 24)	Opposite
30	(Indonesia) Nizar Julfikar	9 December 1994 (age 31)	Setter
31	(Indonesia) Fahreza Rakha Abhinaya	6 December 1999 (age 26)	Libero

Head coach: (Cuba) Reidel Alfonso Gonzales Toiran
