= Surabaya BIN Samator =

Indonesian volleyball team

- 2023 Indonesian men's Proliga
- Full name: Surabaya BIN Samator Volleyball Club
- Short name: SBS
- Nickname: Samator
- Founded: 1998
- History: Surabaya Flame 2002; Surabaya Flame Samator 2003; Surabaya Bhayangkara Samator 2017; Surabaya BIN Samator 2022–
- Ground: Driyorejo, Gresik
- Owner: Indonesian State Intelligence Agency & Samator Indo Gas
- Chairman: (Indonesia) Nanang Masbudi
- Manager: (Iran) Ahmad Masajedi
- Captain: (Indonesia) Rivan Nurmulki
- League: Proliga; Livoli Premier Division
- 2023: Regular season: 4th Postseason: 4th
- Championships: Proliga Champion

Uniforms
Home	Away

Surabaya BIN Samator is a men's volleyball team based in Surabaya, East Java, Indonesia. The team is owned by Samator Indo Gas. The team plays in Indonesian men's Proliga. They had represented Indonesia in AVC Club Championships in 2009, 2012, and 2016.

== History ==
The Surabaya BIN Samator is a volleyball club associated with the Indonesian gas conglomerate Samator Group. According to it, the volleyball team was formally established in 2002. However the history of the club dates back to 1998, when its eventual inaugural coach Ibarsjah Djanu and his friends organized the team. The team has first competed in the Livoli Premier Division, winning the 2000 and 2001 season titles.

Subaya BIN Samator is one of the pioneer teams of the Indonesian men's Proliga which started in 2002. The team was initially known as Surabaya Flame and finished as runners-up in the inaugural season. They won their first title in 2004.

Surabaya Samator continues to participate in the Livoli Premier Division as it wins six more Proliga titles.

In 2017, Surabaya became affiliated with the Indonesian National Police and changed its name to Surabaya Bhayangkara Samator.

Surabaya's long-time coach, Ibarsjah Djanu left the team in 2022. The team became affiliated with Indonesian State Intelligence Agency (BIN) in the same year.

The team took part in the 2026 Invitational Conference of the Spikers' Turf of the Philippines as a guest team.

== Honours ==
Proliga

- Champions (7): 2004, 2007, 2009, 2014, 2016, 2018, 2019
- Runners-up (5): 2002, 2003, 2006, 2010, 2022

Livoli Premier Division

- Champions (8): 2000, 2001, 2009, 2010, 2011, 2014, 2017, 2018
- Runners-up (3): 2015, 2016, 2019

== Players ==
As of February 2023

Surabaya BIN Samator – 2023
Number	Name	Birthdate	Height	Position
1	(Benin) Daouda Yacoubou	12 Juli 1995	197 cm	Outside Hitter
2	(Brazil) Paulo Lamounier	09 Januari 1993	184 cm	Setter
3	(Indonesia) Galih Bayu Saputra	22 Februari 1993	189 cm	Outside Hitter
4	(Indonesia) Tedi Oka Syahputra	25 Oktober 2000	195 cm	Middle Blocker
5	(Indonesia) Muhammad Ega Yuri Pradana	07 Januari 2003	203 cm	Middle Blocker
6	(Indonesia) Hadi Suharto	20 Mei 1996	198 cm	Middle Blocker
7	(Indonesia) Rama Fazza Fauzan	9 September 2002	194 cm	Opposite
8	(Indonesia) Bagas Farhan Ramadhan	11 Desember 2001	194 cm	Setter
10	(Indonesia) Ageng Wardoyo	24 Juli 2000	189 cm	Libero
12	(Indonesia) Rivan Nurmulki (C)	16 Juli 1995	198 cm	Opposite
13	(Indonesia) Richi Rizky	16 Agustus 1993	193 cm	Middle Blocker
14	(Indonesia) Yoga Prastyo	26 Maret 2003	187 cm	Outside Hitter
15	(Indonesia) Hendrik Agel Kurniasandi	14 Januari 1998	176 cm	Libero
16	(Indonesia) Devan Rizky Hamdani	2 April 2002	188 cm	Setter
17	(Indonesia) Agil Angga	15 Mei 2000	194 cm	Outside Hitter
18	(Indonesia) I Putu Randu	15 Januari 1994	196 cm	Middle Blocker

=== Team staff ===
As of February 2023

Coach	(Iran) Ahmed Ryan Masajedi
Assistant coach:	(Indonesia) Sigit Ari Widodo, Novie Efendi, Joni Sugiyatno
