= Indonesian men's Proliga =

Indonesian professional volleyball competition

Proliga
- Current season, competition or edition: 2026 Indonesian men's Proliga
- Sport: Volleyball
- Founded: 2002; 24 years ago
- Founder: PBVSI
- No. of teams: Various (currently 5)
- Country: Indonesia
- Most recent champion: Jakarta LavAni Livin' Transmedia (3rd title)
- Most titles: Surabaya Samator (7 titles)
- Broadcasters: Moji; Champions TV; Vidio; IndiHome TV
- Website: https://www.proliga.co.id/

Proliga is the Indonesian professional top-level competition for volleyball clubs. It is organised by Persatuan Bola Voli Seluruh Indonesia (PBVSI) or Indonesian Volleyball Association.

== Teams ==
=== Current teams (2026 season) ===
2026 Indonesian men's Proliga
Club		Head coach	Captain	Main sponsor
JBP	Jakarta Bhayangkara Presisi	(Cuba) Reidel Toiran	(Indonesia) Nizar Julfikar	Indonesian National Police
JGJ	Jakarta Garuda Jaya	(Indonesia) Nur WIdayanto	(Indonesia) Dawuda Alaihimassalam	Indonesian Volleyball Federation
LAV	Jakarta LavAni Livin' Transmedia	(United States) David Lee	(Indonesia) Dio Zulfikri	Susilo Bambang Yudhoyono, Bank Mandiri, Trans Media
FTB	Medan Falcons Tirta Bhagasasi	(Indonesia) Ariyanto Joko	(Indonesia) Hayun Muhammad	Moji, Vidio
SBS	Surabaya Samator	(Cuba) Rodolfo Sanchez	(Indonesia) Rama Faza Fauzan	Samator Indo Gas

== Honours ==
Year	Champions	Runners-up	Reference
2002	Bandung Tectona	Surabaya Flame	
2003	Jakarta BNI 46	Surabaya Flame	
2004	Surabaya Samator	Bandung Tectona	
2005	Jakarta BNI 46	Jakarta Monas	
2006	Jakarta BNI 46	Surabaya Samator	
2007	Surabaya Samator	Jakarta BNI 46	
2008	Jakarta Sananta	Jakarta BNI 46	
2009	Surabaya Samator	Jakarta Sananta	
2010	Jakarta BNI 46	Surabaya Samator	
2011	Palembang Bank Sumsel Babel	Jakarta Sananta	
2012	Jakarta BNI 46	Semarang Bank Jateng	
2013	Palembang Bank Sumsel Babel	Jakarta BNI 46	
2014	Surabaya Samator	Jakarta Pertamina Energi	
2015	Jakarta Elektrik PLN	Surabaya Samator	
2016	Surabaya Bhayangkara Samator	Jakarta BNI 46	
2017	Jakarta Pertamina Energi	Palembang Bank Sumsel Babel	
2018	Surabaya Bhayangkara Samator	Palembang Bank Sumsel Babel	
2019	Surabaya Bhayangkara Samator	Jakarta BNI 46	
~~2020~~
~~2020~~	Edition cancelled due to COVID-19 pandemic in Indonesia.		
~~2021~~	Edition cancelled due to COVID-19 pandemic in Indonesia.		
2022	Bogor LavAni	Surabaya Bhayangkara Samator	
2023	Jakarta LavAni Allo Bank	Jakarta Bhayangkara Presisi	
2024	Jakarta Bhayangkara Presisi	Jakarta LavAni Allo Bank Electric	
2025	Jakarta Bhayangkara Presisi	Jakarta LavAni Allo Bank Electric	
2026	Jakarta LavAni Livin' Transmedia	Jakarta Bhayangkara Presisi	

=== Titles by clubs ===
Teams	Championships	Runners-up	Years won	Years runners-up
Surabaya Samator	7	6	2004, 2007, 2009, 2014, 2016, 2018, 2019	2002, 2003, 2006, 2010, 2015, 2022
Jakarta BNI 46	5	5	2003, 2005, 2006, 2010, 2012	2007, 2008, 2013, 2016, 2019
Jakarta LavAni	3	2	2022, 2023, 2026	2024, 2025
Palembang Bank Sumsel Babel	2	2	2011, 2013	2017, 2018
Jakarta Bhayangkara Presisi	2	2	2024, 2025	2023, 2026
Jakarta Sananta	1	2	2008	2009, 2011
Jakarta Pertamina Pertamax	1	1	2017	2014
Bandung Tectona	1	1	2002	2004
Jakarta Elektrik PLN	1	0	2015	

== See also ==
- Indonesian women's Proliga
