= Palembang Bank Sumsel Babel =

Men's volleyball team

- 2023 Indonesian men's Proliga
- Full name: Palembang Bank Sumsel Babel Volleyball Club
- Short name: PBS
- Nickname: The Magical Baby
- Founded: 2009; 17 years ago
- Ground: Palembang Sports and Convention Center, South Sumatra (Capacity: 4,000)
- Owner: Bank Sumsel Babel
- Captain: (Indonesia) Gunawan Saputra
- League: Proliga
- 2023: Regular season: 7th Postseason: did not qualify

Palembang Bank Sumsel Babel is a men's volleyball team based in Palembang, South Sumatera, Indonesia. They are members of the Indonesian Volleyball Federation (PBVSI) and plays in Proliga. They represented Indonesia in the AVC Club Championships in 2011.

== Players ==
Palembang Bank Sumsel Babel – 2023
No.	Name	Birthdate	Height	Position
1	(Indonesia) Muhammad Gani Loveano Helmi	3 April 2004	183 cm	Setter
2	(Indonesia) Adi Putra Firmansyah	22 December 1994	195 cm	Middle blocker
3	(Indonesia) Mahfud Nurcahyadi	13 March 1989	194 cm	Middle blocker
6	(Indonesia) Samsul Kohar	30 September 1992	190 cm	Opposite
7	(Indonesia) Mochamad Teguh Adhiyaksa	22 July 2000	180 cm	Setter
8	(South Korea) Song Jun-ho	5 June 1991	191 cm	Outside hitter
9	(Indonesia) Amin Kurnia Sandi Akbar	17 July 1998	196 cm	Outside hitter
10	(Indonesia) Roy Satrio Fernando		173 cm	Libero
11	(Mali) Salimou Souaré	25 August 2000	200 cm	Opposite
12	(Indonesia) Denie Arya Wicaksana	9 June 1999	190 cm	Middle blocker
14	(Indonesia) Muhamad Syaifudin Najib	2 January 1995	174 cm	Libero
15	(Indonesia) Andi Purnomo	7 January 1991	178 cm	Libero
16	(Indonesia) Febriyanto	6 February 1996	192 cm	Outside hitter
17	(Indonesia) Gunawan Saputra	15 September 1995	194 cm	Middle blocker
20	(Indonesia) Hayun Muhammad	17 June 2001	187 cm	Outside hitter
21	(Indonesia) Dedy Maryono	21 January 1997	197 cm	Outside hitter

Coach	(South Korea) Lee Young-taek
Assistant coaches	(Indonesia) Iwan Dedi Setiawan, Raynold Ludwig
Manager	(Indonesia) M. Taufan Yulistian
Assistant manager	(Indonesia) Deco Ronal Rapianto

== Honours ==
Proliga

- Champions (3): 2011, 2012, 2013
