= Jakarta BNI 46 =

Volleyball team based in Jakarta, Indonesia

- 2023 Indonesian men's Proliga
- Full name: Jakarta BNI 46 Volleyball Club
- Short name: BNI
- Founded: 2002; 24 years ago (as Jakarta Phinisi)
- Ground: Jakarta
- Owner: BNI
- Chairman: (Indonesia) Achmad Baiquni
- Manager: (Indonesia) Risco Herlambang
- Captain: (Indonesia) Tri Retno Mutiara
- League: Men's Proliga; Women's Proliga
- 2023 Men's Proliga: Regular season: 5th Postseason: did not qualified
- Website: www.bni.co.id
- Championships: Proliga Champion

Jakarta BNI 46 (formerly Jakarta BNI Taplus) is a men's and women's volleyball team based in Jakarta, Indonesia. The team plays in Proliga. They had represented Indonesia in Men's and Women's AVC Club Championships in 2006 and 2010.

The team is fully owned by PT. Bank Negara Indonesia (Persero) Tbk., a state's owned company of the Government of the Republic of Indonesia. Since 2011, the manager for men's team is Endang Hidayatullah and for the women's team is Andan Kesuma.

== Honours ==
Proliga

- Champions (4): 2003, 2005, 2006, 2010
- Runners-up (4): 2007, 2008, 2012, 2013

Asian Club Championship

- (bronze) Third place (1): 2006

== Current roster ==
As of January 5, 2023

Jakarta BNI 46 Putra – 2023
No.	Name	Birthdate	Height	Position
2	(Indonesia) Ilham Akbar	03 Agustus 1999	178 cm	Outside Hitter
3	(Indonesia) Sigit Ardian (C)	01 Maret 1993	193 cm	Outside Hitter
6	(Indonesia) Imam Ahmad Faisal	14 Mei 2005	195 cm	Opposite
7	(Indonesia) Kaula Nurhidayat	23 Februari 2000	193 cm	Opposite
8	(Indonesia) Dhani Anggriawan	09 Januari 1990	196 cm	Middle Blocker
9	(Indonesia) Achmad Rizal Nurhuda Sugandi	22 November 1999	184 cm	Outside Hitter
10	(Indonesia) Alif Rajab Burrahman	08 Oktober 2000	194 cm	Middle Blocker
11	(Indonesia) Ade Candra Rachmawan	3 December 1992	192 cm	Outside Hitter
12	(Indonesia) Risky Ramadan	16 Januari 1999	195 cm	Middle Blocker
13	(Indonesia) I Kadek Juliadi	18 Juli 1992	189 cm	Setter
14	(Indonesia) Gigih Izhul Mu'minin		176 cm	Libero
15	(Indonesia) Faisal Ashar Arafi	24 Juli 2004	193 cm	Middle Blocker
16	(Indonesia) Muhammad Kadavi		168 cm	Libero
17	(Indonesia) Widya Cahya Wismoyojati		188 cm	Setter
18	(Indonesia) Rian Irawan	12 April 1993	190 cm	Middle Blocker
20	(Serbia) Petar Premović	12 September 1994	200 cm	Opposite
21	(United States) Sam Holt	20 Juni 1993	205 cm	Outside Hitter
99	(Indonesia) Veleg Dhany Ristan	24 Oktober 1990	174 cm	Libero
19	(Indonesia) Muhammad Alfian Taufik Aji Nugroho	29 Juli 1998	197 cm	Middle Blocker

As of January 5, 2023

Coach	(Indonesia) Walfridus Wahyu
Assistant coaches	(Indonesia) Iman Agus F, Bastian Bayu
