= Nicolas Vives =

Cuban volleyball player

Nicolás Vives

Personal information
- Full name: Nicolás Ernesto Vives Coffigny
- Born: 24 April 1970 (age 56); Cienfuegos, Cuba
- Height: 1.89 m (6 ft 2 in)

Volleyball information
- Position: Setter
- Number: 13 (1992); 2 (1996–2000)

National team
1992–2000, 2004	Cuba
Honours
Men's volleyball
Representing Cuba
World League
Gold medal – first place	1998 Milan
Silver medal – second place	1997 Moscow
Silver medal – second place	1999 Mar del Plata
Pan American Games
Bronze medal – third place	1995 Mar del Plata	Team
Central American and Caribbean Games
Gold medal – first place	1993 Ponce	Team
Gold medal – first place	1998 Maracaibo	Team

Nicolás Ernesto Vives Coffigny (born 24 April 1970), more commonly known as Nicolás Vives, is a Cuban former volleyball player and three-time Olympian. He played with the Cuban men's national volleyball team in the 1992, 1996, and 2000 Summer Olympics. He also helped Cuba win the bronze medal at the 1995 Pan American Games in Mar del Plata.

== See also ==
- Cuba at the 2000 Summer Olympics
