= Jakarta Pertamina Pertamax =

- 2023 Indonesian men's Proliga
- Full name: Jakarta Pertamina Pertamax Volleyball Club
- Short name: JPX
- Founded: 2012; 14 years ago as Jakarta Pertamina Energi
- Ground: GOR Pertamina Simprug; Jakarta, Indonesia (Capacity: 500)
- Owner: Pertamina
- Head coach: (Indonesia) Putut Marhaento
- Captain: (Montenegro) Aleksandar Minić
- League: Proliga
- 2023: Regular season: 6th Postseason: Did not qualify

Uniforms
Home	Away

Jakarta Pertamina Pertamax is an Indonesian professional volleyball team. The team was founded in 2012. They are based in Jakarta and are members of the Indonesian Volleyball Federation (PBVSI). The team is owned by Pertamina and their home arena is GOR Pertamina Simprug in Jakarta.

== Honours ==
Proliga

- Champions (1): 2017
- Runners-up (1): 2023

== Players ==
Jakarta Pertamina Pertamax – 2023 Proliga
Number	Name	Birthdate	Height	Position
1	(Montenegro) Aleksandar Minić (C)	9 November 1986	205 cm	Opposite
2	(Indonesia) Yogi Kurniawan	16 Mei 1996	193 cm	Middle blocker
3	(Indonesia) Antho Bertiyawan	23 Juni 1988	190 cm	Middle blocker
4	(Cuba) Yoandri Kindelán	06 Januari 1987	197 cm	Outside hitter
5	(Indonesia) Febrian Adhe Baskoro	11 Februari 1996	180 cm	Setter
6	(Indonesia) Fadilla Rahmatullah Muharram	29 Maret 2002	185	Setter
9	(Indonesia) I Made Edy Kumara Adi	30 Oktober 1994	187 cm	Outside hitter
10	(Indonesia) I Nyoman Julianta	31 Mei 1991	181 cm	Outside hitter
11	(Indonesia) I Made Vandim Sanjaya Putra	28 Januari 1995	187 cm	Middle blocker
12	(Indonesia) Ryno Viagustama	31 Agustus 1995	190 cm	Outside hitter
13	(Indonesia) Vilar Juni Hilal	08 Juni 1998	172 cm	Libero
14	(Indonesia) Ogi Alexander	16 Agustus 2000	192 cm	Opposite
15	(Indonesia) Delly Dwi Putra Heryanto	28 Oktober 1995	168 cm	Libero
17	(Indonesia) I Made Adhi Suartama	25 Januari 1990	180 cm	Setter
18	(Indonesia) Robbi Rimbawan	08 Agustus 1999	191 cm	Middle blocker
21	(Indonesia) Luvi Febrian Nugraha	14 Februari 2004	188 cm	Outside hitter

Coach	(Indonesia) Putut Marhaento
Assistant coach 1	(Indonesia) Endry Oktaviyantono
Assistant coach 2	(Indonesia) Zulnan Budiyansyah
