= Indonesian Volleyball Federation =

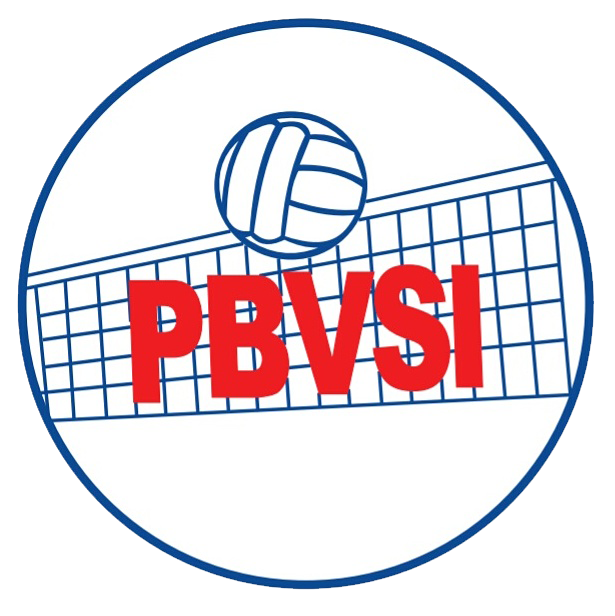
- Sport: Volleyball
- Jurisdiction: Indonesia
- Abbreviation: PBVSI
- Founded: 22 January 1955; 71 years ago
- Affiliation: FIVB
- Regional affiliation: AVC
- Headquarters: Jakarta, Indonesia
- Chairman: Imam Sudjarwo

Official website
- www.pbvsi.or.id
- (Indonesia)

The Indonesian Volleyball Federation, commonly called PBVSI (Indonesian: Persatuan Bola Voli Seluruh Indonesia) sometimes translated as All-Indonesian Volleyball Association) is the governing body of volleyball and beach volleyball in Indonesia. Formed in 1955, its headquarters are in Pancoran, South Jakarta. The PBVSI is a member of the International Volleyball Federation (FIVB) and the Asian Volleyball Confederation (AVC), as well as the volleyball sports in the National Sports Committee of Indonesia. It organizes both the Men's Pro Liga and women's Pro Liga. The organization also administrates the Indonesia Men's Volleyball Team and the Indonesia Women's Volleyball Team.

== History ==
In 1953, after the third Indonesia National Sports Week was completed, the Executive Board of Surabaya Volleyball Association (Indonesian: Ikatan Perhimpunan Volleyball Surabaya, I.P.V.O.S) held a management meeting around the middle of 1954.

In the IPVOS meeting, ideas or decisions were made to form a national volleyball parent organization.

In order to realize this idea, the IPVOS board finally sent someone to meet with the board of the Indonesian Olympic Committee in Jakarta.

== Chairman ==
| No | Name | Took office | left office |
|---|---|---|---|
| 1 | Willem Johannes Latumenten | 1955 | 1961 |
| 2 | A. Saat | 1961 | 1964 |
| 3 | Rachmad Soepono | 1964 | 1967 |
| 4 | Daryono Wasito | 1967 | 1971 |
| 5 | Muchlis | 1972 | 1972 |
| 6 | S. Haryono | 1972 | 1975 |
| 7 | Wing Wiryawan Wirjodiprodjo | 1975 | 1980 |
| 8 | Anton Soedjarwo | 1980 | 1988 |
| 9 | Mochammad Sanoesi | 1985 | 1991 |
| 10 | Kunarto | 1991 | 1995 |
| 11 | Siti Hardijanti Rukmana | 1996 | 2000 |
| 12 | Rita Subowo | 2000 | 2005 |
| 13 | Sutanto | 2006 | 2014 |
| 14 | Imam Sudjarwo | 2014 | 2027 |

== Competitions ==
- Professional level
  - Indonesian men's Proliga
  - Indonesian women's Proliga
- Amateur/semi-pro level
  - Livoli Premier Division
  - Livoli Division I

== National teams ==
Men's

- Indonesia men's national volleyball team
- Indonesia men's national under-21 volleyball team
- Indonesia men's national under-19 volleyball team
- Indonesia men's national under-17 volleyball team

Women's

- Indonesia women's national volleyball team
- Indonesia women's national under-21 volleyball team
- Indonesia women's national under-19 volleyball team
- Indonesia women's national under-17 volleyball team
