= 2024 SEA V.League Challenge =

- Association: Southeast Asian Volleyball Association
- League: SEA V.League Challenge
- Sport: Volleyball
- Duration: 30 August–2 September, 2024
- Matches: 10
- Teams: 4

1st V.League Challenge
- Season champions: Cambodia
- Runners-up: Malaysia
- Promoted to SEA V.League: Cambodia

Seasons
- 2025 →

The 2024 SEA V.League Challenge was the first edition of the SEA V.League Challenge, contested by four men's national teams that are the members of the Southeast Asian Volleyball Association (SAVA), the sport's regional governing body affiliated to Asian Volleyball Confederation (AVC). The tournament was held at the National Olympic Indoor Stadium in Phnom Penh, Cambodia between 30 August and 2 September 2024. This inaugural tournament served as a SEA Men's V.League qualifier, with the winner earning the right to participate in the 2025 SEA Men's V.League.

Cambodia won their first title after defeating Malaysia in three sets, promoting them to the next edition of SEA V.League where they will join the remaining teams — Indonesia, The Philippines, and Thailand.

== Teams ==
- Cambodia (host)
- Laos
- Malaysia
- Singapore

== Venue ==
All matches
Phnom Penh, Cambodia
National Olympic Indoor Stadium
Capacity: 8,000

== Pool standing procedure ==
1. Total number of victories (matches won, matches lost)
2. In the event of a tie, the following first tiebreaker will apply: The teams will be ranked by the most points gained per match as follows:
  - Match won 3–0 or 3–1: 3 points for the winner, 0 points for the loser
  - Match won 3–2: 2 points for the winner, 1 point for the loser
  - Match forfeited: 3 points for the winner, 0 points (0–25, 0–25, 0–25) for the loser
3. If teams are still tied after examining the number of victories and points gained, then the FIVB will examine the results in order to break the tie in the following order:
  - Sets quotient: if two or more teams are tied on the number of points gained, they will be ranked by the quotient resulting from the division of the number of all sets won by the number of all sets lost.
  - Points quotient: if the tie persists based on the sets quotient, the teams will be ranked by the quotient resulting from the division of all points scored by the total of points lost during all sets.
  - If the tie persists based on the points quotient, the tie will be broken based on the team that won the match of the Round Robin Phase between the tied teams. When the tie in points quotient is between three or more teams, these teams ranked taking into consideration only the matches involving the teams in question.

== Preliminary round ==
- All times are Indochina Time (UTC+07:00).

| Pos | Team | Pld | W | L | Pts | SW | SL | SR | SPW | SPL | SPR | Qualification |
|---|---|---|---|---|---|---|---|---|---|---|---|---|
| 1 | Cambodia (H) | 3 | 3 | 0 | 9 | 9 | 2 | 4.500 | 265 | 215 | 1.233 | Semifinals |
| 2 | Malaysia | 3 | 2 | 1 | 6 | 7 | 3 | 2.333 | 235 | 198 | 1.187 | Semifinals |
| 3 | Singapore | 3 | 1 | 2 | 3 | 4 | 6 | 0.667 | 208 | 224 | 0.929 | Semifinals |
| 4 | Laos | 3 | 0 | 3 | 0 | 0 | 9 | 0.000 | 154 | 225 | 0.684 | Semifinals |

Source: Asian Volleyball Confederation
(H) Host

| Date | Time | | Score | | Set 1 | Set 2 | Set 3 | Set 4 | Set 5 | Total | Report |
|---|---|---|---|---|---|---|---|---|---|---|---|
| 30 Aug | 16:00 | Laos | 0–3 | Singapore | 17–25 | 14–25 | 20–25 | | | 51–75 | |
| 30 Aug | 18:30 | Cambodia | 3–1 | Malaysia | 17–25 | 25–18 | 25–21 | 25–21 | | 92–85 | |
| 31 Aug | 16:00 | Malaysia | 3–0 | Singapore | 25–20 | 25–22 | 25–18 | | | 75–60 | |
| 31 Aug | 18:30 | Cambodia | 3–0 | Laos | 25–16 | 25–18 | 25–23 | | | 75–57 | |
| 01 Sep | 16:00 | Laos | 0–3 | Malaysia | 11–25 | 21–25 | 14–25 | | | 46–75 | |
| 01 Sep | 18:30 | Singapore | 1–3 | Cambodia | 20–25 | 10–25 | 25–23 | 18–25 | | 73–98 | |

== Final round ==
- All times are Indochina Time (UTC+07:00).

Semifinals
02 Sep
Cambodia | 3
Laos | 0
02 Sep
Malaysia | 3
Singapore | 0

Final
02 Sep
Cambodia | 3
Malaysia | 0
3rd place match
02 Sep
Laos | 1
Singapore | 3

=== Semifinals ===
| Date | Time | | Score | | Set 1 | Set 2 | Set 3 | Set 4 | Set 5 | Total | Report |
|---|---|---|---|---|---|---|---|---|---|---|---|
| 02 Sep | 08:00 | Cambodia | 3–0 | Laos | 25–16 | 27–25 | 25–17 | | | 77–58 | |
| 02 Sep | 10:00 | Malaysia | 3–0 | Singapore | 26–24 | 25–21 | 25–18 | | | 76–63 | |

=== 3rd place match ===
| Date | Time | | Score | | Set 1 | Set 2 | Set 3 | Set 4 | Set 5 | Total | Report |
|---|---|---|---|---|---|---|---|---|---|---|---|
| 02 Sep | 17:00 | Laos | 1–3 | Singapore | 14–25 | 20–25 | 25–23 | 13–25 | | 72–98 | |

=== Final ===
| Date | Time | | Score | | Set 1 | Set 2 | Set 3 | Set 4 | Set 5 | Total | Report |
|---|---|---|---|---|---|---|---|---|---|---|---|
| 02 Sep | 19:00 | Cambodia | 3–0 | Malaysia | 25–22 | 25–16 | 25–23 | | | 75–61 | |

== Final standing ==
| Rank | Team |
|---|---|
| 1st place, gold medalist(s) | Cambodia |
| 2nd place, silver medalist(s) | Malaysia |
| 3rd place, bronze medalist(s) | Singapore |
| 4 | Laos |

| Qualified for the 2025 SEA V.League |

2024 SEA V.League Challenge champions

Cambodia
1st title

14–man roster
Khim Sovandara, Seng Kimhab, Born Narith, Pin Sarun, Ron Sokchea, Voeurn Veasna, Soeurn Heng, Mouen Menglaiy, Kuon Mom, Phol Ratanak, Soun Channaro (c), Mourn Nimu, Kheng Thona, Chan Veasna, Thy Menghuong
Head coach
(China) Li Jun

== See also ==
- 2024 SEA Men's V.League
