= Volleyball at the 2021 SEA Games =

2022 tournament in Quảng Ninh, Vietnam

- Venue: Đại Yên Arena (indoor); Tuần Châu (beach)
- Dates: 13–22 May 2022

Volleyball at the 2021 SEA Games took place in Quảng Ninh, Vietnam from 13 to 22 May 2022. The 2021 Games featured competitions in four events. The indoor volleyball competition took place at Đại Yên Arena, and the beach volleyball competitions were held at Tuần Châu Resort. All events were free-entry for spectators.

== Medal table ==
* Host nation (Vietnam)

Rank	Nation	Gold	Silver	Bronze	Total
1	Indonesia	2	1	1	4
2	Thailand	2	1	0	3
3	Vietnam*	0	2	0	2
4	Philippines	0	0	2	2
5	Cambodia	0	0	1	1
Totals (5 entries)		4	4	4	12

== Participating nations ==
Nation	Indoor		Beach	
Nation	Men	Women	Men	Women
Cambodia	Yes	No	Yes	No
Indonesia	Yes	Yes	Yes	Yes
Laos	No	No	Yes	No
Malaysia	Yes	Yes	Yes	Yes
Myanmar	Yes	No	No	No
Philippines	Yes	Yes	Yes	Yes
Singapore	No	No	Yes	Yes
Thailand	Yes	Yes	Yes	Yes
Vietnam	Yes	Yes	Yes	Yes
Total: 9 NOCs	7	5	8	5

== Competition schedule ==
Indoor volleyball events were held from 13 to 22 May 2022, while beach volleyball events were held from 15 to 21 May 2022.

The following was the competition schedule for the indoor volleyball competitions:

P	Preliminaries	5-7	5th-7th place play-off	5	5th place play-off	½	Semifinals	B	Bronze	F	Final

Event	Fri 13	Sat 14	Sun 15	Mon 16	Tue 17	Wed 18	Thu 19	Fri 20		Sat 21	Sun 22
Men	P	P	P	P	P	P	5-7	5	½	B	F
Women	P	P	P	P	P	P	P			B	F

The following was the competition schedule for the beach volleyball competitions:

P	Preliminaries	7	7th place play-off	5	5th place play-off	½	Semifinals	B	Bronze	F	Final

Event	Sun 15	Mon 16	Tue 17	Wed 18		Thu 19	Fri 20		
Men	P	P	P	P	7	½	5	B	F
Women	P	P	P	P		P	B		F

== Indoor volleyball ==
=== Men's tournament ===
The tournament featured 7 countries. The format was the same as 2019; there was a group of three or four teams with round-robin format each. The top two of each group played in the semifinal round. The winners of the semifinal round played for the gold medal and the losers played for the bronze medal.

Rank	Team	Pld	W	L
1st place, gold medalist(s)	Indonesia	5	5	0
2nd place, silver medalist(s)	Vietnam	5	3	2
3rd place, bronze medalist(s)	Cambodia	4	2	2
4	Thailand	4	2	2
5	Philippines	4	2	2
6	Myanmar	4	1	3
7	Malaysia	4	0	4

=== Women's tournament ===
The tournament featured 5 countries. There was a group of five teams with round-robin format. The top two of group played for the gold medal and the third and fourth place of group played for the bronze medal.

Rank	Team	Pld	W	L
1st place, gold medalist(s)	Thailand	5	5	0
2nd place, silver medalist(s)	Vietnam	5	3	2
3rd place, bronze medalist(s)	Indonesia	5	3	2
4	Philippines	5	1	4
5	Malaysia	4	0	4

== Beach volleyball ==
=== Men's tournament ===
The tournament featured 8 countries separated into 2 Pools with round robin format. Each country has 2 pairs of players playing in a best of 3 set match. The top two of group played in the semifinal round. The winners of the semifinal round played for the gold medal and the losers played for the bronze.

=== Women's tournament ===
The tournament featured 6 countries. There was a group of six team with round-robin format. The top two of group played for the gold medal and the third and fourth place of group played for the bronze medal.

== Medalists ==
Event	Gold	Silver	Bronze
Men's indoor volleyball	Indonesia; Rendy Febriant Tamamilang; Sigit Ardian; Muhammad Malizi; Daffa Naufal; Yuda Mardiansyah Putra; Dimas Saputra; Rivan Nurmulki; Irpan; Farhan Halim; Dio Zulfikri; Nizar Julfikar; Fahreza Rakha; Doni Haryono	Vietnam; Huỳnh Trung Trực; Trịnh Duy Phúc; Giang Văn Đức; Quản Trọng Nghĩa; Nguyễn Văn Quốc Duy; Từ Thanh Thuận; Nguyễn Xuân Thanh; Phạm Thái Hưng; Lâm Văn Sanh; Nguyễn Đình Nhu; Nguyễn Văn Nam; Vũ Ngọc Hoàng; Dương Văn Tiên; Cù Văn Hoàn	Cambodia; Khim Sovandara; Chheang Phearoth; Pin Sarun; Heng Soeurn; An Sokheang; Kuon Mom; Phol Ratanak; Soun Channaro; Lang Reaseykeo; Mourn Nimul; Voeurn Veasna hol Phaniet; Mon Sokheang; Kong Piseth
Women's indoor volleyball	Thailand; Wipawee Srithong; Piyanut Pannoy; Pornpun Guedpard; Thatdao Nuekjang; Kannika Thipachot; Jarasporn Bundasak; Hattaya Bamrungsuk; Sutadta Chuewulim; Pimpichaya Kokram; Ajcharaporn Kongyot; Chatchu-on Moksri; Supattra Pairoj; Sirima Manakij; Tichakorn Boonlert	Vietnam; Lê Thị Thanh Liên; Trần Thị Thanh Thúy; Nguyễn Thị Uyên; Phạm Thị Nguyệt Anh; Trần Việt Hương; Trần Thị Bích Thủy; Nguyễn Thị Bích Tuyền; Hoàng Thị Kiều Trinh; Nguyễn Thu Hoài; Nguyễn Thị Trinh; Đinh Thị Thúy; Lưu Thị Huệ; Đoàn Thị Lâm Oanh; Nguyễn Thị Kim Liên	Indonesia; Amalia Fajrina Nabila; Arsela Nuari Purnama; Megawati Hangestri Pertiwi; Nandita Ayu Salsabila; Ratri Wulandari; Shella Bernadetha Onnan; Tisya Amallya Putri; Wilda Nurfadhilah; Yolana Betha Pangestika; Yolla Yuliana; Ditta Azizah; Shintia Alliva Maulidina
Men's beach volleyball	Indonesia; Ade Candra Rachmawan; Mohammad Ashfiya; Gilang Ramadhan; Rendy Verdian Licardo	Thailand; Surin Jongklang; Banlue Nakarkhong; Pithak Tipjan; Poravid Taovalo	Philippines; Jude Garcia; Anthony Lemuel Arbasto Jr. Ranran Abdilla; Jaron Requinton
Women's beach volleyball	Thailand; Taravadee Naraphornrapat; Worapeerachayakorn Kongphopsarutawadee; Varapatsorn Radarong; Tanarattha Udomchavee	Indonesia; Dhita Juliana; Putu Dini Jasita Utami; Nur Sari; Sari Hartati	Philippines; Sisi Rondina; Bernadeth Pons; Jovelyn Gonzaga; Dij Rodriguez
