= Indonesia men's national volleyball team results =

The following is a list of fixtures and results of the Indonesia men's national volleyball team against other national teams.

== 1960 ==
=== 1962 Asian Games ===
#	Opponent	Date	Result	Host city	Round
1	South Korea	25 August	3–1 (15–6, 15–11, 13–15, 15–9)	(Indonesia) Jakarta	Preliminary round Pool A
2	Thailand	27 August	3–0 (15–7, 15–12, 15–10)	(Indonesia) Jakarta	Preliminary round Pool A
3	Burma	29 August	3–0 (15–10, 15–9, 15–9)	(Indonesia) Jakarta	Final round
4	South Korea	30 August	2–3 (3–15, 11–15, 15–8, 15–11, 10–15)	(Indonesia) Jakarta	Final round
5	Pakistan	31 August	3–2 (17–15, 15–6, 2–15, 11–15, 15–13)	(Indonesia) Jakarta	Final round
6	India	1 September	1–3 (9–15, 15–13, 4–15, 8–15)	(Indonesia) Jakarta	Final round
7	Japan	2 September	0–3 (1–15, 1–15, 10–15)	(Indonesia) Jakarta	Final round

=== 1966 Asian Games ===
#	Opponent	Date	Result	Host city	Round
1	South Korea	10 December	0–3	(Thailand) Bangkok	Preliminary round Pool C
2	South Vietnam	11 December	3–0	(Thailand) Bangkok	Preliminary round Pool C
3	Pakistan	12 December	3–0	(Thailand) Bangkok	Preliminary round Pool C
4	India	13 December	2–3	(Thailand) Bangkok	Final round
5	Japan	14 December	0–3	(Thailand) Bangkok	Final round
6	South Korea	15 December	0–3	(Thailand) Bangkok	Final round
7	Thailand	17 December	3–1	(Thailand) Bangkok	Final round
8	Iran	19 December	2–3 (10–15, 15–10, 15–13, 10–15, 8–15)	(Thailand) Bangkok	Final round

== 1970 ==
=== 1970 Asian Games ===
#	Opponent	Date	Result	Host city	Round
1	Thailand	10 December	3–0	(Thailand) Bangkok	Round robin
2	South Korea	11 December	0–3	(Thailand) Bangkok	Round robin
3	Iran	12 December	0–3 (2–15, 5–15, 3–15)	(Thailand) Bangkok	Round robin
4	Taiwan	13 December	0–3	(Thailand) Bangkok	Round robin
5	Japan	14 December	0–3	(Thailand) Bangkok	Round robin
6	Pakistan	16 December	3–1	(Thailand) Bangkok	Round robin
7	Khmer Republic	18 December	0–3	(Thailand) Bangkok	Round robin

=== 1974 World Championship qualification ===
#	Opponent	Date	Result	Host city	Round
1	Philippines	6 November 1973	1–3 (11–15, 15–11, ?–15, 4–15)	(Philippines) Manila	Round robin
2	Hong Kong	7 November 1973	3–0 (15–6, 15–10, 15–4)	(Philippines) Manila	Round robin
3	South Korea	12 November 1973	0–3 (6–15, 6–15, 7–15)	(Philippines) Manila	Round robin
4	Taiwan	November 1973	?–3	(Philippines) Manila	Round robin

=== 1975 Asian Championship ===
#	Opponent	Date	Result	Host city	Round
1	China	18 August	0–3 (3–15, 5–15, 1–15)	(Australia) Melbourne	Round robin
2	Japan	20 August	0–3 (2–15, 6–15, 5–15)	(Australia) Melbourne	Round robin
3	South Korea	21 August	0–3 (4–15, 4–15, 2–15)	(Australia) Melbourne	Round robin
4	New Zealand	26 August	3–1 (15–12, 15–17, 15–10, 15–8)	(Australia) Melbourne	Round robin
5	Australia	August	0–3	(Australia) Melbourne	Round robin
6	Philippines	August	0–3	(Australia) Melbourne	Round robin

== 1980 ==
=== 1982 Asian Games ===
#	Opponent	Date	Result	Host city	Round
1	Saudi Arabia	21 November	3–1 (15–5, 15–7, 7–15, 15–5)	(India) New Delhi	Preliminary round Pool A
2	Bangladesh	22 November	3–0 (15–10, 15–7, 15–7)	(India) New Delhi	Preliminary round Pool A
3	India	23 November	1–3 (8–15, 15–4, 14–16, 12–15)	(India) New Delhi	Preliminary round Pool A
4	Qatar	28 November	3–0 (15–7, 15–5, 15–6)	(India) New Delhi	Classification round 5th–8th place
5	Kuwait	30 November	3–0 (15–11, 18–16, 15–11)	(India) New Delhi	Classification round 5th–8th place
6	Iraq	1 December	1–3 (9–15, 15–12, 6–15, 1–15)	(India) New Delhi	Classification round 5th–8th place

=== 1983 SEA Games ===
#	Opponent	Date	Result	Host city	Round
1	Cambodia	30 May	3–1	Singapore	Preliminary round Pool B
2	Thailand	1 June	3–1	Singapore	Preliminary round Pool B
3	Burma	2 June	0–3	Singapore	Preliminary round Pool B
4	Singapore	3 June	3–0 (15–6, 15–2, 15–4)	Singapore	Semifinal
5	Burma	4 June	0–3 (11–15, 13–15, 12–15)	Singapore	Final

=== 1983 Asian Championship ===
#	Opponent	Date	Result	Host city	Round
1	Chinese Taipei	23 November	0–3 (7–15, 5–15, 5–15)	(Japan) Tokyo	Preliminary round Pool A
2	Japan	24 November	0–3 (3–15, 6–15, 2–15)	(Japan) Tokyo	Preliminary round Pool A
3	Australia	25 November	1–3 (9–15, 16–14, 15–17, 11–15)	(Japan) Tokyo	Preliminary round Pool A
4	India	27 November	0–3 (12–15, 6–15, 9–15)	(Japan) Tokyo	Preliminary round Pool A
5	Hong Kong	29 November	3–0 (15–13, 15–3, 15–11)	(Japan) Tokyo	Classification round 9th–11th place
6	Nepal	1 December	3–0	(Japan) Tokyo	Classification round 9th–11th place

=== 1986 Asian Games ===
#	Opponent	Date	Result	Host city	Round
1	Saudi Arabia	21 September	0–3 (6–15, 5–15, 2–15)	(South Korea) Seoul	Preliminary round Pool A
2	Hong Kong	22 September	3–0 (15–3, 15–4, 15–8)	(South Korea) Seoul	Preliminary round Pool A
3	South Korea	23 September	0–3 (3–15, 1–15, 5–15)	(South Korea) Seoul	Preliminary round Pool A
4	India	24 September	0–3 (10–15, 5–15, 5–15)	(South Korea) Seoul	Preliminary round Pool A
5	Bahrain	25 September	1–3 (4–15, 15–6, 11–15, 11–15)	(South Korea) Seoul	Preliminary round Pool A
6	Nepal	27 September	3–0 (15–3, 15–6, 15–5)	(South Korea) Seoul	Classification round 9th–12th place
7	Thailand	30 September	1–3 (11–15, 15–7, 7–15, 10–15)	(South Korea) Seoul	Classification round 9th–12th place
8	Hong Kong	2 October	3–0 (15–9, 15–8, 15–3)	(South Korea) Seoul	Classification round 9th–12th place

=== 1989 SEA Games ===
#	Opponent	Date	Result	Host city	Round
1	Burma	29 August	3–2 (13–15, 15–9, 13–15, 15–7, 15–13)	(Malaysia) Kuala Lumpur	Final
Head coach: (Indonesia) Wienarto

== 1990 ==
=== 1991 Asian Championship ===
#	Opponent	Date	Result	Host city	Round
1	Japan	11 August	0–3 (4–15, ?–15, ?–15)	(Australia) Perth	Preliminary round Pool C
2	Saudi Arabia	12 August	3–1 (15–7, 15–17, 15–9, 15–13)	(Australia) Perth	Preliminary round Pool C
3	India	13 August	3–1 (15–13, 11–15, 15–9, 15–10)	(Australia) Perth	Preliminary round Pool C
4	Australia	14 August	0–3 (7–15, 3–15, 13–15)	(Australia) Perth	Classification round Pool E
5	Chinese Taipei	15 August	2–3	(Australia) Perth	Classification round Pool E
6	Pakistan	17 August	3–?	(Australia) Perth	Classification round 5th–8th place
7	Chinese Taipei	18 August	1–3 (15–6, 11–15, 6–15, 13–15)	(Australia) Perth	5th place match

=== 1998 World Championship qualification ===
#	Opponent	Date	Result	Host city	Round
1	South Korea	3 October 1997	0–3 (1–15, 6–15, 0–15)	(Saudi Arabia) Jeddah	Preliminary round Pool C
2	Thailand	4 October 1997	0–3 (10–15, 1–15, 8–15)	(Saudi Arabia) Jeddah	Preliminary round Pool C
3	Saudi Arabia	5 October 1997	0–3 (10–15, 6–15, 8–15)	(Saudi Arabia) Jeddah	Preliminary round Pool C

=== 1998 Asian Games ===
#	Opponent	Date	Result	Host city	Round
1	Thailand	7 December	1–3 (16–14, 14–16, 8–15, 8–15)	(Thailand) Bangkok	Preliminary round Pool A
2	Qatar	8 December	3–0 (15–11, 15–13, 15–10)	(Thailand) Bangkok	Preliminary round Pool A
3	South Korea	9 December	0–3 (1–15, 7–15, 5–15)	(Thailand) Bangkok	Preliminary round Pool A
4	Chinese Taipei	11 December	0–3 (10–15, 11–15, 6–15)	(Thailand) Bangkok	Preliminary round Pool A
5	India	13 December	3–0 (15–12, 15–5, 16–14)	(Thailand) Bangkok	Classification round 5th–8th place
6	Thailand	14 December	0–3 (16–17, 6–15, 8–15)	(Thailand) Bangkok	5th place match

=== 1999 Asian Championship ===
#	Opponent	Date	Result	Host city	Round
1	Iran	3 September	1–3 (19–25, 25–22, 22–25, 19–25)	(Iran) Tehran	Preliminary round Pool A
2	Qatar	4 September	3–0 (25–23, 25–23, 25–20)	(Iran) Tehran	Preliminary round Pool A
3	Japan	5 September	0–3 (20–25, 15–25, 17–25)	(Iran) Tehran	Quarterfinal Pool E
4	South Korea	6 September	0–3 (25–27, 16–25, 16–25)	(Iran) Tehran	Quarterfinal Pool E
5	Chinese Taipei	8 September	3–2 (25–16, 24–26, 23–25, 25–18, 15–10)	(Iran) Tehran	Classification round 5th–8th place
6	Pakistan	9 September	3–2 (25–22, 22–25, 25–19, 21–25, 15–12)	(Iran) Tehran	Classification round 5th–8th place

== 2000 ==
=== 2002 World Championship qualification ===
#	Opponent	Date	Result	Host city	Round
1	Kazakhstan	3 August 2001	0–3 (19–25, 21–25, 17–25)	(Kazakhstan) Almaty	Preliminary round Pool C
2	South Korea	4 August 2001	0–3 (17–25, 9–25, 7–25)	(Kazakhstan) Almaty	Preliminary round Pool C
3	Uzbekistan	5 August 2001	3–1 (23–25, 30–28, 26–24, 25–18)	(Kazakhstan) Almaty	Preliminary round Pool C

=== 2001 SEA Games ===
#	Opponent	Date	Result	Host city	Round
1	Philippines	9 September	?	(Malaysia) Kuala Lumpur	Round robin
2	Malaysia	10 September	2–3 (21–25, 26–24, 22–25, 26–24, 13–15)	(Malaysia) Kuala Lumpur	Round robin
3	Vietnam	11 September	0–3 (21–25, 25–27, 22–25)	(Malaysia) Kuala Lumpur	Round robin
4	Thailand	12 September	0–3 (18–25, 20–25, 19–25)	(Malaysia) Kuala Lumpur	Round robin
5	Myanmar	13 September	?	(Malaysia) Kuala Lumpur	Round robin
6	Thailand	15 September	?–3	(Malaysia) Kuala Lumpur	Semifinal
7	Myanmar	16 September	0–3	(Malaysia) Kuala Lumpur	Bronze medal match

=== 2003 SEA Games ===
#	Opponent	Date	Result	Host city	Round
1	Philippines	December	3–1 (25–22, 25–19, 23–25, 25–21)	(Vietnam) Ninh Bình	Preliminary round Pool B
2	Malaysia	December	3–0 (25–17, 25–17, 25–23)	(Vietnam) Ninh Bình	Preliminary round Pool B
3	Thailand	December	2–3 (9–25, 25–19, 18–25, 25–20, 9–15)	(Vietnam) Ninh Bình	Preliminary round Pool B
4	Myanmar	11 December	3–1 (25–20, 25–18, 23–25, 25–14)	(Vietnam) Ninh Bình	Semifinal
5	Thailand	12 December	3–0 (25–19, 25–16, 25–21)	(Vietnam) Ninh Bình	Final
Head coach: (China) Li Qiujiang

=== 2006 World Championship qualification ===
#	Opponent	Date	Result	Host city	Round
1	Tonga	2 March 2005	3–0 (25–15, 25–19, 25–14)	(Philippines) Cebu City	First round Pool C
2	Macau	4 March 2005	3–0 (25–17, 25–19, 25–11)	(Philippines) Cebu City	First round Pool C
3	Philippines	5 March 2005	3–0 (25–15, 20–25, 20–25)	(Philippines) Cebu City	First round Pool C
4	Chinese Taipei	6 March 2005	1–3 (17–25, 22–25, 25–22, 24–26)	(Philippines) Cebu City	First round Pool C
5	India	24 June 2005	2–3 (26–24, 20–25, 23–25, 25–21, 13–15)	(India) Chennai	Second round Pool E
6	China	25 June 2005	0–3 (16–25, 14–25, 17–25)	(India) Chennai	Second round Pool E
7	Thailand	26 June 2005	3–0 (25–18, 25–21, 25–12)	(India) Chennai	Second round Pool E
Head coach: (China) Li Qiujiang

=== 2005 Asian Championship ===
#	Opponent	Date	Result	Host city	Round
1	United Arab Emirates	20 September	3–1 (25–19, 25–20, 22–25, 25–18)	(Thailand) Suphan Buri	Preliminary round Pool B
2	Japan	21 September	1–3 (23–25, 26–24, 18–25, 19–25)	(Thailand) Suphan Buri	Preliminary round Pool B
3	Vietnam	22 September	3–2 (24–26, 25–19, 25–18, 22–25, 15–5)	(Thailand) Suphan Buri	Preliminary round Pool B
4	Uzbekistan	23 September	3–0 (25–20, 25–13, 25–17)	(Thailand) Suphan Buri	Quarterfinal Pool H
5	Philippines	24 September	3–1 (25–12, 25–20, 20–25, 25–14)	(Thailand) Suphan Buri	Quarterfinal Pool H
6	Bahrain	25 September	0–3 (17–25, 19–25, 25–27)	(Thailand) Suphan Buri	Classification round 9th–12th place
7	Vietnam	26 September	3–2 (22–25, 22–25, 25–21, 25–22, 15–13)	(Thailand) Suphan Buri	11th place match
Head coach: (China) Li Qiujiang

=== 2005 SEA Games ===
#	Opponent	Date	Result	Host city	Round
1	Myanmar	28 November	3–0 (25–23, 25–19, 25–20)	(Philippines) Bacolod	Preliminary round
2	Thailand	29 November	0–3 (23–25, 17–25, 23–25)	(Philippines) Bacolod	Preliminary round
3	Vietnam	1 December	3–0 (27–25, 25–17, 25–21)	(Philippines) Bacolod	Preliminary round
4	Philippines	3 December	3–2 (26–28, 17–25, 25–22, 25–22, 15–13)	(Philippines) Bacolod	Preliminary round
5	Thailand	5 December	1–3 (25–23, 21–25, 19–25, 18–25)	(Philippines) Bacolod	Final
Head coach: (China) Li Qiujiang

=== 2007 Asian Championship ===
#	Opponent	Date	Result	Host city	Round
1	Thailand	3 September	3–2 (25–23, 22–25, 25–18, 22–25, 15–12)	(Indonesia) Jakarta	Classification round Pool E
2	Chinese Taipei	4 September	2–3 (17–25, 25–17, 31–33, 25–21, 16–18)	(Indonesia) Jakarta	Classification round Pool E
3	China	5 September	2–3 (16–25, 15–25, 25–21, 25–23, 10–15)	(Indonesia) Jakarta	Classification round Pool E
4	Japan	6 September	0–3 (18–25, 21–25, 15–25)	(Indonesia) Jakarta	Championship
5	Australia	7 September	0–3 (20–25, 34–36, 25–27)	(Indonesia) Jakarta	Championship
6	Iran	8 September	0–3 (22–25, 24–26, 16–25)	(Indonesia) Jakarta	Championship
7	South Korea	9 September	0–3 (17–25, 17–25, 21–25)	(Indonesia) Jakarta	Championship
Head coach: (China) Hu Xinyu

=== 2007 SEA Games ===
#	Opponent	Date	Result	Host city	Round
1	Myanmar	7 December	3–2 (23–25, 26–28, 25–20, 25–20, 15–9)	(Thailand) Nakhon Ratchasima	Preliminary round Pool A
2	Thailand	8 December	3–2 (23–25, 25–23, 25–19, 20–25, 22–20)	(Thailand) Nakhon Ratchasima	Preliminary round Pool A
3	Laos	9 December	3–0 (25–17, 25–15, 25–14)	(Thailand) Nakhon Ratchasima	Preliminary round Pool A
4	Vietnam	13 December	2–3 (25–22, 22–25, 25–15, 21–25, 14–16)	(Thailand) Nakhon Ratchasima	Preliminary round Pool A
5	Vietnam	14 December	3–0 (25–21, 25–20, 25–22)	(Thailand) Nakhon Ratchasima	Final
Head coach: (China) Hu Xinyu

=== 2008 Olympic qualification ===
#	Opponent	Date	Result	Host city	Round
1	Portugal	30 May	0–3 (23–25, 17–25, 21–25)	(Portugal) Espinho	2nd world qualification
2	Poland	31 May	0–3 (20–25, 17–25, 23–25)	(Portugal) Espinho	2nd world qualification
3	Puerto Rico	1 June	0–3 (21–25, 21–25, 22–25)	(Portugal) Espinho	2nd world qualification
Head coach: (China) Hu Xinyu

=== 2008 Asian Cup ===
#	Opponent	Date	Result	Host city	Round
1	Japan	20 September	1–3 (26–24, 20–25, 19–25, 23–25)	(Thailand) Nakhon Ratchasima	Preliminary round Pool B
2	Australia	21 September	0–3 (24–26, 16–25, 25–27)	(Thailand) Nakhon Ratchasima	Preliminary round Pool B
3	Chinese Taipei	22 September	0–3 (26–28, 23–25, 16–25)	(Thailand) Nakhon Ratchasima	Preliminary round Pool B
4	South Korea	24 September	0–3 (15–25, 27–29, 23–25)	(Thailand) Nakhon Ratchasima	Quarterfinal
5	Australia	25 September	2–3 (23–25, 25–19, 17–25, 25–20, 8–15)	(Thailand) Nakhon Ratchasima	Classification round 5th–8th place
6	Chinese Taipei	26 September	1–3 (21–25, 23–25, 25–21, 27–29)	(Thailand) Nakhon Ratchasima	7th place match
Head coach: (China) Hu Xinyu

=== 2010 World Championship qualification ===
#	Opponent	Date	Result	Host city	Round
1	Qatar	9 June 2009	3–1 (19–25, 30–28, 25–23, 25–21)	(Thailand) Nakhon Pathom	Second round Pool E
2	Bangladesh	10 June 2009	3–0 (25–11, 25–18, 25–13)	(Thailand) Nakhon Pathom	Second round Pool E
3	Thailand	11 June 2009	2–3 (25–20, 22–25, 25–27, 29–27, 8–15)	(Thailand) Nakhon Pathom	Second round Pool E
Head coach: (China) Li Qiujiang

=== 2009 Asian Championship ===
#	Opponent	Date	Result	Host city	Round
1	India	27 September	3–1 (13–25, 25–22, 25–23, 25–16)	(Philippines) Manila	Preliminary round Pool B
2	Thailand	28 September	3–0 (25–23, 25–21, 25–20)	(Philippines) Manila	Preliminary round Pool B
3	Japan	1 October	0–3 (21–25, 21–25, 19–25)	(Philippines) Manila	Preliminary round Pool B
4	South Korea	2 October	0–3 (17–25, 15–25, 15–25)	(Philippines) Manila	Classification round Pool F
5	Australia	3 October	3–2 (26–24, 21–25, 25–22, 20–25, 15–10)	(Philippines) Manila	Classification round Pool F
6	Chinese Taipei	4 October	3–2 (25–18, 20–25, 19–25, 27–25, 15–9)	(Philippines) Manila	Classification round 5th–8th place
7	Kazakhstan	5 October	1–3 (18–25, 25–22, 10–25, 17–25)	(Philippines) Manila	5th place match
Head coach: (China) Li Qiujiang

=== 2009 SEA Games ===
#	Opponent	Date	Result	Host city	Round
1	Malaysia	10 December	3–0 (25–11, 26–24, 25–21)	(Laos) Vientiane	Preliminary round Pool B
2	Vietnam	12 December	3–0 (25–20, 25–22, 25–15)	(Laos) Vientiane	Preliminary round Pool B
3	Myanmar	15 December	3–0 (25–21, 25–18, 25–22)	(Laos) Vientiane	Semifinal
4	Thailand	17 December	3–2 (25–23, 21–25, 25–16, 26–28, 19–17)	(Laos) Vientiane	Final
Head coach: (China) Li Qiujiang

== 2010 ==
=== 2010 Asian Games ===
#	Opponent	Date	Result	Host city	Round
1	Turkmenistan	13 November	3–2 (20–25, 26–24, 26–28, 25–21, 15–12)	(China) Guangzhou	Preliminary round Pool C
2	Saudi Arabia	14 November	1–3 (25–19, 19–25, 22–25, 22–25)	(China) Guangzhou	Preliminary round Pool C
3	Iran	16 November	0–3 (15–25, 23–25, 23–25)	(China) Guangzhou	Preliminary round Pool C
4	Mongolia	17 November	3–0 (25–22, 25–17, 25–16)	(China) Guangzhou	Preliminary round Pool C
5	Chinese Taipei	19 November	0–3 (18–25, 23–25, 14–25)	(China) Guangzhou	Second round Pool G
6	Pakistan	20 November	2–3 (22–25, 25–23, 25–20, 23–25, 13–15)	(China) Guangzhou	Second round Pool G
7	Vietnam	21 November	3–2 (22–25, 22–25, 25–20, 25–23, 15–12)	(China) Guangzhou	Classification round 13th–16th place
8	Myanmar	23 November	3–1 (19–25, 25–18, 25–22, 25–20)	(China) Guangzhou	13th place match
Head coach: (China) Li Qiujiang

=== 2011 Asian Championship ===
#	Opponent	Date	Result	Host city	Round
1	Uzbekistan	21 September	3–1 (23–25, 25–14, 25–14, 25–22)	(Iran) Tehran	Preliminary round Pool B
2	China	22 September	0–3 (22–25, 19–25, 14–25)	(Iran) Tehran	Preliminary round Pool B
3	Sri Lanka	23 September	2–3 (20–25, 26–28, 21–25, 21–25, 13–15)	(Iran) Tehran	Preliminary round Pool B
4	Turkmenistan	25 September	3–1 (25–20, 25–22, 25–27, 25–22)	(Iran) Tehran	Classification round Pool H
5	Qatar	26 September	3–1 (23–25, 28–26, 25–22, 25–17)	(Iran) Tehran	Classification round Pool H
6	Thailand	27 September	0–3 (17–25, 20–25, 21–25)	(Iran) Tehran	Classification round 9th–12th place
7	Qatar	28 September	3–2 (23–25, 25–22, 22–25, 25–22, 18–16)	(Iran) Tehran	11th place match
Head coach: (China) Li Qiujiang

=== 2011 SEA Games ===
#	Opponent	Date	Result	Host city	Round
1	Cambodia	November	3–0 (25–10, 25–22, 25–13)	(Indonesia) Jakarta	Round robin
2	Malaysia	November	3–1 (24–26, 25–16, 25–21, 25–22)	(Indonesia) Jakarta	Round robin
3	Myanmar	November	3–1 (25–22, 22–25, 25–20, ?)	(Indonesia) Jakarta	Round robin
4	Vietnam	November	3–1 (25–18, 25–21, 23–25, 25–17)	(Indonesia) Jakarta	Round robin
5	Thailand	November	0–3 (23–25, 20–25, 23–25)	(Indonesia) Jakarta	Round robin
6	Thailand	20 November	0–3 (23–25, 17–25, 19–25)	(Indonesia) Jakarta	Final
Head coach: (China) Li Qiujiang

=== 2014 World Championship qualification ===
#	Opponent	Date	Result	Host city	Round
1	Myanmar	26 June 2013	3–2 (25–21, 21–25, 19–25, 25–21, 15–11)	(Thailand) Nakhon Pathom	Zonal round
2	Vietnam	27 June 2013	3–0 (25–18, 25–16, 25–19)	(Thailand) Nakhon Pathom	Zonal round
3	Thailand	28 June 2013	0–3 (14–25, 35–37, 21–25)	(Thailand) Nakhon Pathom	Zonal round
4	Bahrain	11 September 2013	0–3 (16–25, 20–25, 21–25)	(Iran) Tehran	Final round Pool B
5	Iran	12 September 2013	0–3 (12–25, 20–25, 11–25)	(Iran) Tehran	Final round Pool B
6	Pakistan	13 September 2013	3–0 (25–15, 25–23, 25–19)	(Iran) Tehran	Final round Pool B
Head coach: (Indonesia) Ibarsjah Djanu

=== 2013 SEA Games ===
#	Opponent	Date	Result	Host city	Round
1	Vietnam	14 December	3–2 (32–30, 23–25, 17–25, 25–15, 15–9)	(Myanmar) Naypyidaw	Preliminary round Pool B
2	Laos	16 December	3–0 (25–13, 25–15, 25–16)	(Myanmar) Naypyidaw	Preliminary round Pool B
3	Myanmar	19 December	3–2 (25–20, 25–22, 21–25, 19–25, 15–13)	(Myanmar) Naypyidaw	Semifinal
4	Thailand	21 December	0–3 (20–25, 17–25, 21–25)	(Myanmar) Naypyidaw	Final
Head coach: (Indonesia) Ibarsjah Djanu

=== 2015 SEA Games ===
#	Opponent	Date	Result	Host city	Round
1	Vietnam	11 June	0–3 (23–25, 23–25, 15–25)	Singapore	Preliminary round Pool B
2	Singapore	12 June	3–0 (25–14, 25–14, 25–15)	Singapore	Preliminary round Pool B
3	Cambodia	14 June	3–0 (25–21, 25–20, 25–20)	Singapore	Preliminary round Pool B
4	Thailand	15 June	0–3 (18–25, 23–25, 16–25)	Singapore	Semifinal
Head coach: (Indonesia) Ibarsjah Djanu

=== 2017 Asian Championship ===
#	Opponent	Date	Result	Host city	Round
1	Saudi Arabia	24 July	3–1 (25–23, 25–21, 22–25, 26–24)	(Indonesia) Gresik	Preliminary round Pool A
2	Kazakhstan	25 July	2–3 (25–23, 25–27, 21–25, 25–21, 13–15)	(Indonesia) Gresik	Preliminary round Pool A
3	Qatar	26 July	3–2 (24–26, 14–25, 25–20, 25–21, 15–11)	(Indonesia) Gresik	Preliminary round Pool A
4	South Korea	27 July	1–3 (21–25, 25–20, 14–25, 16–25)	(Indonesia) Gresik	Classification round Pool E
5	Japan	29 July	0–3 (23–25, 15–25, 12–25)	(Indonesia) Gresik	Classification round Pool E
6	Iran	30 July	3–2 (18–25, 18–25, 25–23, 26–24, 15–11)	(Indonesia) Gresik	Quarterfinal
7	Japan	31 July	0–3 (17–25, 24–26, 23–25)	(Indonesia) Gresik	Semifinal
8	South Korea	1 August	0–3 (16–25, 21–25, 13–25)	(Indonesia) Gresik	Bronze medal match
Head coach: (Indonesia) Samsul Jais

=== 2017 SEA Games ===
#	Opponent	Date	Result	Host city	Round
1	Timor-Leste	22 August	3–0 (25–9, 25–6, 25–8)	(Malaysia) Kuala Lumpur	Preliminary round Pool B
2	Philippines	23 August	3–1 (25–21, 23–25, 35–33, 25–21)	(Malaysia) Kuala Lumpur	Preliminary round Pool B
3	Vietnam	24 August	3–0 (26–24, 25–20, 25–20)	(Malaysia) Kuala Lumpur	Preliminary round Pool B
4	Myanmar	26 August	3–2 (22–25, 25–17, 24–26, 34–32, 15–12)	(Malaysia) Kuala Lumpur	Semifinal
5	Thailand	27 August	1–3 (16–25, 22–25, 25–20, 20–25)	(Malaysia) Kuala Lumpur	Final
Head coach: (Indonesia) Samsul Jais

=== 2018 Asian Games ===
#	Opponent	Date	Result	Host city	Round
1	Saudi Arabia	22 August	1–3 (23–25, 25–16, 19–25, 22–25)	(Indonesia) Jakarta	Preliminary round Pool A
2	Kyrgyzstan	24 August	3–0 (25–21, 25–17, 25–20)	(Indonesia) Jakarta	Preliminary round Pool A
3	Thailand	26 August	3–2 (25–22, 25–23, 23–25, 22–25, 15–12)	(Indonesia) Jakarta	Round of 16
4	South Korea	28 August	0–3 (22–25, 18–25, 18–25)	(Indonesia) Jakarta	Quarterfinal
5	Japan	1 September	2–3 (33–35, 25–22, 21–25, 27–25, 12–15)	(Indonesia) Jakarta	5th place match
Head coach: (Indonesia) Samsul Jais

=== 2019 Asian Championship ===
#	Opponent	Date	Result	Host city	Round
1	Kuwait	13 September	3–1 (22–25, 25–20, 25–17, 25–18)	(Iran) Tehran	Preliminary round Pool D
2	Pakistan	14 September	2–3 (20–25, 24–26, 25–19, 25–20, 13–15)	(Iran) Tehran	Preliminary round Pool D
3	South Korea	15 September	0–3 (22–25, 19–25, 20–25)	(Iran) Tehran	Preliminary round Pool D
4	Hong Kong	17 September	3–0 (25–21, 25–18, 25–20)	(Iran) Tehran	Classification round Pool H
5	Thailand	18 September	2–3 (22–25, 20–25, 25–23, 25–23, 9–15)	(Iran) Tehran	Classification round Pool H
6	Qatar	19 September	0–3 (24–26, 17–25, 17–25)	(Iran) Tehran	Classification round 9th–12th place
7	Thailand	20 September	2–3 (25–16, 28–30, 25–21, 17–25, 10–15)	(Iran) Tehran	11th place match
Head coach: (China) Li Qiujiang

=== 2019 SEA Games ===
#	Opponent	Date	Result	Host city	Round
1	Vietnam	2 December	3–0 (25–20, 25–22, 25–21)	(Philippines) Pasig	Preliminary round Pool B
2	Cambodia	4 December	3–0 (25–20, 25–17, 35–33)	(Philippines) Pasig	Preliminary round Pool B
3	Philippines	6 December	3–0 (25–23, 32–30, 25–20)	(Philippines) Pasig	Preliminary round Pool B
4	Myanmar	8 December	3–0 (25–19, 25–23, 25–15)	(Philippines) Pasig	Semifinal
5	Philippines	10 December	3–0 (25–21, 27–25, 25–17)	(Philippines) Pasig	Final
Head coach: (China) Li Qiujiang

== 2020 ==
=== 2021 SEA Games ===
#	Opponent	Date	Result	Host city	Round
1	Myanmar	13 May (2022)	3–0 (25–22, 25–17, 25–19)	(Vietnam) Quảng Ninh	Preliminary round Pool A
2	Vietnam	15 May (2022)	3–1 (21–25, 25–15, 25–21, 25–14)	(Vietnam) Quảng Ninh	Preliminary round Pool A
3	Malaysia	17 May (2022)	3–0 (25–12, 25–11, 25–13)	(Vietnam) Quảng Ninh	Preliminary round Pool A
4	Cambodia	20 May (2022)	3–1 (25–18, 25–15, 22–25, 25–16)	(Vietnam) Quảng Ninh	Semifinal
5	Vietnam	22 May (2022)	3–0 (25–22, 25–18, 25–15)	(Vietnam) Quảng Ninh	Final
Head coach: (China) Jiang Jie

=== 2023 SEA Games ===
#	Opponent	Date	Result	Host city	Round
1	Philippines	3 May	3–0 (25–18, 25–18, 25–23)	(Cambodia) Phnom Penh	Preliminary round Pool A
2	Singapore	4 May	3–0 (29–27, 25–8, 25–10)	(Cambodia) Phnom Penh	Preliminary round Pool A
3	Cambodia	6 May	3–0 (25–18, 25–21, 25–16)	(Cambodia) Phnom Penh	Preliminary round Pool A
4	Vietnam	7 May	3–0 (30–28, 25–19, 25–18)	(Cambodia) Phnom Penh	Semifinal
5	Cambodia	8 May	3–0 (25–21, 25–10, 25–15)	(Cambodia) Phnom Penh	Final
Head coach: (China) Jiang Jie

=== 2023 Asian Challenge Cup ===
#	Opponent	Date	Result	Host city	Round
1	Sri Lanka	8 July	3–1 (25–21, 25–18, 20–25, 25–17)	(Taiwan) Taipei	Preliminary round Pool F
2	Bahrain	10 July	3–2 (33–31, 25–27, 21–25, 25–23, 15–11)	(Taiwan) Taipei	Preliminary round Pool F
3	Kazakhstan	12 July	3–0 (30–28, 25–21, 25–15)	(Taiwan) Taipei	Round of 12
4	Thailand	13 July	2–3 (20–25, 27–25, 25–20, 16–25, 12–15)	(Taiwan) Taipei	Quarterfinal
5	Australia	15 July	1–3 (20–25, 18–25, 25–19, 16–25)	(Taiwan) Taipei	5th place match
Head coach: (China) Jiang Jie

=== 2023 SEA V.League ===
#	Opponent	Date	Result	Host city	Round
1	Philippines	21 July	3–0 (25–20, 25–22, 25–19)	(Indonesia) Bogor	Round robin
2	Vietnam	22 July	3–0 (25–20, 25–19, 25–20)	(Indonesia) Bogor	Round robin
3	Thailand	23 July	3–1 (21–25, 25–17, 25–23, 27–25)	(Indonesia) Bogor	Round robin
4	Vietnam	28 July	3–1 (25–23, 21–25, 25–14, 25–23)	(Philippines) Santa Rosa	Round robin
5	Philippines	29 July	3–0 (24–20, 25–22, 25–20)	(Philippines) Santa Rosa	Round robin
6	Thailand	30 July	3–2 (25–27, 20–25, 25–21, 25–21, 15–9)	(Philippines) Santa Rosa	Round robin
Head coach: (China) Jiang Jie

=== 2023 Asian Championship ===
#	Opponent	Date	Result	Host city	Round
1	China	19 August	2–3 (22–25, 25–22, 19–25, 28–26, 13–15)	(Iran) Urmia	Preliminary round Pool C
2	Kazakhstan	20 August	3–1 (24–26, 25–19, 25–12, 25–21)	(Iran) Urmia	Preliminary round Pool C
3	South Korea	23 August	2–3 (16–25, 25–19, 25–22, 19–25, 14–16)	(Iran) Urmia	Round of 12
4	India	24 August	3–0 (31–29, 25–18, 25–12)	(Iran) Urmia	Classification round 7th–12th place
5	Pakistan	25 August	2–3 (25–19, 22–25, 25–23, 13–25, 12–15)	(Iran) Urmia	Classification round 7th–10th place
6	Thailand	26 August	3–0 (25–21, 25–23, 25–21)	(Iran) Urmia	9th place match
Head coach: (China) Jiang Jie

=== 2022 Asian Games ===
#	Opponent	Date	Result	Host city	Round
1	Philippines	19 September (2023)	3–0 (25–22, 25–23, 25–20)	(China) Hangzhou	Preliminary round Pool F
2	Japan	20 September (2023)	0–3 (18–25, 20–25, 18–25)	(China) Hangzhou	Preliminary round Pool F
3	Afghanistan	21 September (2023)	3–0 (25–18, 25–21, 25–17)	(China) Hangzhou	Preliminary round Pool F
4	China	22 September (2023)	1–3 (17–25, 17–25, 25–23, 22–25)	(China) Hangzhou	Round of 12
5	Kazakhstan	25 September (2023)	3–2 (25–22, 24–26, 22–25, 25–16, 15–12)	(China) Hangzhou	Classification round 7th–10th place
6	South Korea	26 September (2023)	2–3 (27–29, 25–19, 19–25, 25–21, 8–15)	(China) Hangzhou	7th place match
Head coach: (China) Jiang Jie

=== 2024 Asian Challenge Cup ===
#	Opponent	Date	Result	Host city	Round
1	South Korea	2 June	0–3 (11–25, 16–25, 9–25)	(Bahrain) Isa Town	Preliminary round Pool C
2	Qatar	4 June	0–3 (17–25, 15–25, 17–25)	(Bahrain) Isa Town	Preliminary round Pool C
3	Philippines	5 June	1–3 (11–25, 25–23, 14–25, 22–25)	(Bahrain) Isa Town	Classification round 9th–12th place
4	Chinese Taipei	7 June	3–0 (26–24, 25–21, 27–25)	(Bahrain) Isa Town	11th place match
Head coach: (Indonesia) Joni Sugiyatno

=== 2024 SEA V.League ===
#	Opponent	Date	Result	Host city	Round
1	Thailand	16 August	0–3 (21–25, 23–25, 20–25)	(Philippines) Santa Rosa	Round robin
2	Philippines	17 August	3–1 (23–25, 25–19, 25–11, 25–21)	(Philippines) Santa Rosa	Round robin
3	Vietnam	18 August	3–2 (21–25, 25–21, 19–25, 25–22, 15–12)	(Philippines) Santa Rosa	Round robin
4	Philippines	23 August	3–0 (26–24, 25–11, 25–15)	(Indonesia) Yogyakarta	Round robin
5	Vietnam	24 August	3–2 (25–22, 28–30, 22–25, 25–16, 15–13)	(Indonesia) Yogyakarta	Round robin
6	Thailand	25 August	1–3 (20–25 24–26 25–22 26–28)	(Indonesia) Yogyakarta	Round robin
Head coach: (China) Li Qiujiang

=== 2025 Asian Nations Cup ===
#	Opponent	Date	Result	Host city	Round
1	Thailand	18 June	3–2 (22–25, 22–25, 25–19, 25–23, 15–8)	(Bahrain) Manama	Preliminary round Pool A
2	Bahrain	19 June	0–3 (25–13, 27–25, 25–22)	(Bahrain) Manama	Preliminary round Pool A
3	Pakistan	21 June	1–3 (25–20, 21–25, 20–25, 17–25)	(Bahrain) Manama	Quarterfinals
4	Vietnam	22 June	3–2 (23–25, 24–26, 25–17, 25–23, 15–12)	(Bahrain) Manama	Classification round 5th–8th place
5	Australia	23 June	0–3 (25–20, 25–21, 25–22)	(Bahrain) Manama	5th place match
Head coach: (China) Jiang Jie

=== 2025 SEA V.League ===
#	Opponent	Date	Result	Host city	Round
1	Thailand	9 July	1–3 (22–25, 25–21, 25–22, 25–20)	(Philippines) Candon	Round robin
2	Cambodia	11 July	3–0 (23–25, 18–25, 23–25)	(Philippines) Candon	Round robin
3	Vietnam	12 July	3–2 (25–18, 23–25, 25–21, 22–25, 15–8)	(Philippines) Candon	Round robin
4	Philippines	13 July	3–0 (25–19, 25–17, 25–17)	(Philippines) Candon	Round robin
5	Philippines	16 July	3–2 (19–25, 25–19, 25–21, 22–25, 8–15)	(Indonesia) Jakarta	Round robin
6	Vietnam	17 July	3–1 (25–18, 22–25, 25–22, 25–15)	(Indonesia) Jakarta	Round robin
7	Cambodia	19 July	3–0 (25–21, 25–14, 25–22)	(Indonesia) Jakarta	Round robin
8	Thailand	20 July	3–2 (27–29, 25–15, 25–23, 22–25, 15–13)	(Indonesia) Jakarta	Round robin
Head coach: (China) Jiang Jie

=== 2025 SEA Games ===
#	Opponent	Date	Result	Host city	Round
1	Myanmar	15 December	3–0 (25–15, 25–22, 25–19)	(Thailand) Bangkok	Preliminary round Pool B
2	Philippines	16 December	3–0 (25–17, 27–25, 26–24)	(Thailand) Bangkok	Preliminary round Pool B
3	Vietnam	18 December	3–2 (21–25, 20–25, 25–22, 25–19, 15–10)	(Thailand) Bangkok	Semifinal
4	Thailand	19 December	2–3 (20–25, 25–16, 23–25, 25–23, 12–15)	(Thailand) Bangkok	Final
Head coach: (China) Jiang Jie

=== 2026 AVC Cup ===
#	Opponent	Date	Result	Host city	Round
1	South Korea	21 June	0–3 (22–25, 22–25, 21–25)	(India) Ahmedabad	Preliminary round Pool B
2	Qatar	22 June	3–2 (14–25, 25–22, 32–30, 25–27, 15–13)	(India) Ahmedabad	Preliminary round Pool B
3	Thailand	23 June	3–2 (19–25, 25–19, 25–22, 23–25, 15–12)	(India) Ahmedabad	Preliminary round Pool B
4	Oman	26 June	3–1 (25–23, 20–25, 25–19, 25–21)	(India) Ahmedabad	Preliminary round Pool B
5	India	27 June	3–2 (15–25, 26–24, 25–20, 19–25, 15–13)	(India) Ahmedabad	Semifinal
6	South Korea	28 June	3–0 (34–32, 25–16, 25–23)	(India) Ahmedabad	Final
Head coach: (Cuba) Reidel Toiran

=== 2026 SEA V Cup ===
#	Opponent	Date	Result	Host city	Round
1	Cambodia	16 July	3–0 (25–18, 25–18, 25–21)	(Philippines) Candon	Leg 1
2	Philippines	17 July	3–0 (25–20, 25–23, 27–25)	(Philippines) Candon	Leg 1
3	Vietnam	18 July	3–0 (25–22, 25–20, 25–22)	(Philippines) Candon	Leg 1
4	Cambodia	19 July	2–3 (23–25, 26–28, 25–23, 25–22, 11–15)	(Philippines) Candon	Leg 1
5	Cambodia	22 July	3–0 (26–24, 25–15, 25–17)	(Indonesia) Jakarta	Leg 2
6	Philippines	24 July	3–1 (25–18, 25–17, 23–25, 25–19)	(Indonesia) Jakarta	Leg 2
7	Vietnam	25 July	1–3 (25–22, 22–25, 19–25, 18–25)	(Indonesia) Jakarta	Leg 2
8	Cambodia	26 July	3–1 (25–18, 19–25, 25–20, 26–24)	(Indonesia) Jakarta	Leg 2
Head coach: (Cuba) Reidel Toiran

=== 2026 Asian Games ===
#	Opponent	Date	Result	Host city	Round
1	Thailand	27 September	2–3 (23–25, 25–20, 23–25, 25–23, 23–25)	(Japan) Okazaki	Preliminary round Pool B
2	Kyrgyzstan	28 September	3–0 (27–25, 25–21, 25–15)	(Japan) Okazaki	Preliminary round Pool B
3	Iran	29 September	2–3 (25–22, 25–21, 21–25, 19–25, 17–15)	(Japan) Okazaki	Preliminary round Pool B
4	Philippines	1 October	3–1 (25–23, 24–26, 25–22, 25–21)	(Japan) Komaki	Classification; 9th–16th
5	Vietnam	2 October	1–3 (19–25, 23–25, 25–21, 22–25)	(Japan) Komaki	Classification; 9th–12th
6	Kazakhstan	3 October	1–3 (23–25, 25–23, 18–25, 20–25)	(Japan) Komaki	11th place match
Head coach: (Cuba) Reidel Toiran

== Overall head-to-head ==
As of October 2026

Opponent	GP	MW	ML	SW	SL	SD	Win %
Afghanistan	1	1	0	3	0	+3	100%
Australia	9	1	8	7	26	–19	11.11%
Bahrain	5	1	4	4	14	–10	20%
Bangladesh	2	2	0	6	0	+6	100%
Cambodia	14	12	2	38	9	+29	85.71%
China	6	0	6	5	18	–13	0%
Chinese Taipei	14	3	11	16	37	–21	21.43%
Hong Kong	5	5	0	15	0	+15	100%
India	11	5	6	21	22	–1	45.45%
Iran	8	1	7	8	23	–15	12.5%
Iraq	1	0	1	1	3	–2	0%
Japan	15	0	15	4	45	–41	0%
Kazakhstan	7	3	4	13	15	–2	42.86%
Kuwait	2	2	0	6	1	+5	100%
Kyrgyzstan	2	2	0	6	0	+6	100%
Laos	2	2	0	6	0	+6	100%
Macau	1	1	0	3	0	+3	100%
Malaysia	5	4	1	14	4	+10	80%
Mongolia	1	1	0	3	0	+3	100%
Myanmar	17	14	3	42	22	+20	82.35%
Nepal	2	2	0	6	0	+6	100%
New Zealand	1	1	0	3	1	+2	100%
Oman	1	1	0	3	1	+2	100%
Pakistan	10	6	4	25	17	+8	60%
Philippines	22	19	3	59	19	+40	86.36%
Poland	1	0	1	0	3	–3	0%
Portugal	1	0	1	0	3	–3	0%
Puerto Rico	1	0	1	0	3	–3	0%
Qatar	10	8	2	24	14	+10	80%
Saudi Arabia	7	3	4	11	15	–4	42.86%
Singapore	3	3	0	9	0	+9	100%
South Korea	24	2	22	13	67	–54	8.33%
Sri Lanka	2	1	1	5	4	+1	50%
Thailand	47	20	27	80	100	–20	42.55%
Timor-Leste	1	1	0	3	0	+3	100%
Tonga	1	1	0	3	0	+3	100%
Turkmenistan	2	2	0	6	3	+3	100%
United Arab Emirates	1	1	0	3	1	+2	100%
Uzbekistan	3	3	0	9	2	+7	100%
Vietnam	29	24	5	76	37	+39	85.71%
Total	297	158	139	559	529	+30	53.2%
