= Southeast Asian Volleyball Association =

Zonal association of volleyball in Southeast Asia

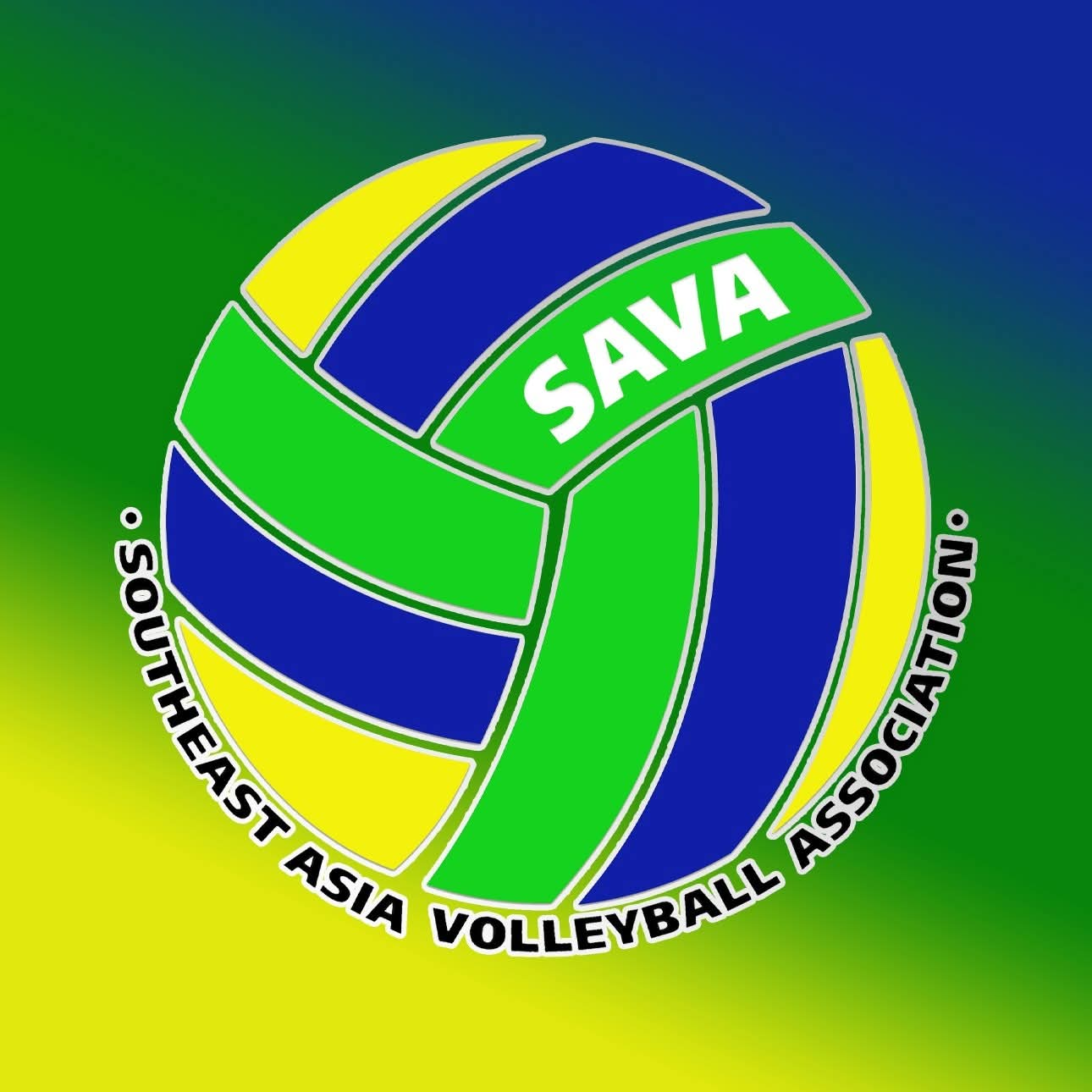
- Abbreviation: SAVA
- Formation: December 1993; 32 years ago
- Type: Volleyball organisation
- Headquarters: Bangkok, Thailand
- Region served: Southeast Asia
- Members: 11 national federations
- Official languages: English
- President: Somporn Chaibangyang
- Parent organization: AVC

The Southeast Asian Volleyball Association (SAVA) is one of five zonal associations of governance in volleyball within the Asian Volleyball Confederation (AVC). It governs indoor volleyball and beach volleyball in Southeast Asia. SAVA consists of 11 national federation members which are full members with the Fédération Internationale de Volleyball (FIVB). All of them also represent the National Olympic Committees (NOCs) of their respective countries and dependent territories, allowing them to participate in the Olympic Games.

SAVA consists of the national volleyball federations of Southeast Asia and run zonal championships including the SEA V.League Men's Division and SEA V.League Women's Division. It also promotes regional volleyball, supports the creation of national federations affiliated with FIVB, ensures compliance with FIVB regulations, plans annual activities, and reports competition results to the FIVB and confederations.

The current president, Somporn Chaibangyang, president of the Thailand Volleyball Association, was elected as SAVA's president for the 2024–2028 term in Bangkok, Thailand, in February 2024.

== National federations ==
The Southeast Asian Volleyball Association has 11 national federations.

Code	Federation	National teams	Founded	FIVB affiliation	AVC affiliation	IOC member
BRU	Brunei	Men's; U23; U21; U19; U17; Women's; U23; U21; U19; U17				Yes
CAM	Cambodia	Men's; U23; U21; U19; U17; Women's; U23; U21; U19; U17				Yes
INA	Indonesia	Men's; U23; U21; U19; U17; Women's; U23; U21; U19; U17	1955			Yes
LAO	Laos	Men's; U23; U21; U19; U17; Women's; U23; U21; U19; U17				Yes
MAS	Malaysia	Men's; U23; U21; U19; U17; Women's; U23; U21; U19; U17				Yes
MYA	Myanmar	Men's; U23; U21; U19; U17; Women's; U23; U21; U19; U17				Yes
PHI	Philippines	Men's; U23; U21; U19; U17; Women's; U23; U21; U19; U17	2021	2021	2021	Yes
SIN	Singapore	Men's; U23; U21; U19; U17; Women's; U23; U21; U19; U17				Yes
THA	Thailand	Men's; U23; U21; U19; U17; Women's; U23; U21; U19; U17	1959			Yes
TLS	Timor-Leste	Men's; U23; U21; U19; U17; Women's; U23; U21; U19; U17				Yes
VIE	Vietnam	Men's; U23; U21; U19; U17; Women's; U23; U21; U19; U17	1961	1991	1991	Yes

== Competitions ==
=== Indoor volleyball ===
Tournament	Champions	Runners-up	3rd place	Ref.
National teams (men)
SEA V Cup (2026)	Cambodia (1st leg)	Indonesia (1st leg)	Thailand (1st leg)	
SEA V Cup (2026)	Vietnam (2nd leg)	Thailand (2nd leg)	Indonesia (2nd leg)	
SEA V.League Challenge (2024)	Cambodia	Malaysia	Singapore	
SEA Games (2025)	Thailand	Indonesia	Philippines	
National teams (women)
SEA V Cup (2026)	Thailand (1st leg)	Vietnam (1st leg)	Indonesia (1st leg)	
SEA V Cup (2026)	Thailand (2nd leg)	Philippines (2nd leg)	Indonesia (2nd leg)	
SEA Games (2025)	Thailand	Vietnam	Indonesia	
Princess Cup U18 (2026)	Thailand	Vietnam	Philippines	

=== Beach volleyball ===
Competition	Winners	Runner-up	Third place	Current edition
Men tournament
SEA Games	Indonesia (INA); Bintang Akbar; Sofyan Rachman Efendi; Yosi Ariel Firnanda; Danangsyah Pribadi	Thailand (THA); Dunwinit Kaewsai; Wachirawit Muadpha; Netitorn Muneekul; Banlue Nakprakhong; Poravid Taovato	Vietnam (VIE); Lê Hoàng Ý Nguyễn Anh Tuấn; Nguyễn Lâm Tới; Trần Văn Việt	2025
Women tournament
SEA Games	Philippines (PHI); Genesa Jane Eslapor; Bernadeth Pons; Floremel Rodriguez; Sisi Rondina; Sunny Villapando	Thailand (THA); Worapeerachayakorn; Kongphopsarutawadee; Salinda Mungkhon; Taravadee Naraphornrapat; Rumpaipruet Numwong; Tanarattha Udomchavee	Vietnam (VIE); Châu Ngọc Lan; Đinh Thị Mỹ Ngà; Mai Hồng Hạnh; Nguyễn Lê Thị Tường Vy	2025

== See also ==
- Central Asian Volleyball Association
- Eastern Asian Volleyball Association
- Oceania Zonal Volleyball Association
- West Asian Volleyball Association
