= Volleyball at the 1975 SEAP Games =

Volleyball at the 1975 Southeast Asian Peninsular Games
- Dates: 10–16 December 1975
- Nations: 4

The volleyball tournament at the 1975 SEAP Games was held from 10 December to 16 December 1975 in Bangkok, Thailand.

== Men's tournament ==
=== Participating nations ===
- Burma
- Malaysia
- Singapore
- Thailand

=== Round robin ===
Date		Score		Set 1	Set 2	Set 3	Set 4	Set 5	Total	Report
10 Dec	Thailand	3–0	Malaysia	16–14	15–6	15–3				Results
11 Dec	Burma	3–0	Malaysia	15–10	15–2	15–9				Results
12 Dec	Burma	–	Thailand	–	–	–	–			Results

=== Final round ===
==== Gold medal match ====
Date		Score		Set 1	Set 2	Set 3	Set 4	Set 5	Total	Report
16 Dec	Burma	3–?	Thailand	–	–	–	–			Results

== Women's tournament ==
=== Participating nations ===
- Burma
- Malaysia
- Singapore
- Thailand

=== Round robin ===
Date		Score		Set 1	Set 2	Set 3	Set 4	Set 5	Total	Report
10 Dec	Thailand	3–0	Malaysia	15–8	15–0	15–8				Results
11 Dec	Malaysia	3–2	Singapore	15–9	13–15	8–15	15–13	15–9		Results
12 Dec	Singapore	–	Thailand	–	–	–				Results

=== Final round ===
==== Semifinals ====
Date		Score		Set 1	Set 2	Set 3	Set 4	Set 5	Total	Report
15 Dec	Singapore	3–1	Malaysia	–	–	–	–	–		Results
15 Dec	Thailand	3–?	Burma	–	–	–	–	–		Results

==== Bronze medal match ====
Date		Score		Set 1	Set 2	Set 3	Set 4	Set 5	Total	Report
16 Dec	Malaysia	3–?	Burma	–	–	–	–	–		Results

==== Gold medal match ====
Date		Score		Set 1	Set 2	Set 3	Set 4	Set 5	Total	Report
16 Dec	Singapore	2–3	Thailand	15–9	3–15	8–15	16–14	7–15		Results

== Medal winners ==
Event	Gold	Silver	Bronze
Men's volleyball	Burma (BIR)	Thailand (THA)	?
Women's volleyball	Thailand (THA)	Singapore (SIN)	Malaysia (MAS)
