= Volleyball at the 2019 SEA Games – Men's tournament =

Men's volleyball tournament at the 2019 SEA Games
- Venue: PhilSports Arena, Pasig
- Dates: 2–10 December
- Nations: 7

Medalists
gold medal	Indonesia
silver medal	Philippines
bronze medal	Thailand

The men's volleyball tournament at the 2019 SEA Games was held at the PhilSports Arena in Pasig between 2 and 10 December 2019.

== Draw ==
The draw for the men's volleyball tournament was held on 15 October 2019 at the Sofitel Manila in Pasay. Malaysia entered the tournament but withdrew shortly prior to the draw. Timor Leste, which were drawn in Group A, withdrew after the draw has taken place. The Philippines as host chose the group which it wanted to be allocated in.

== Participating nations ==
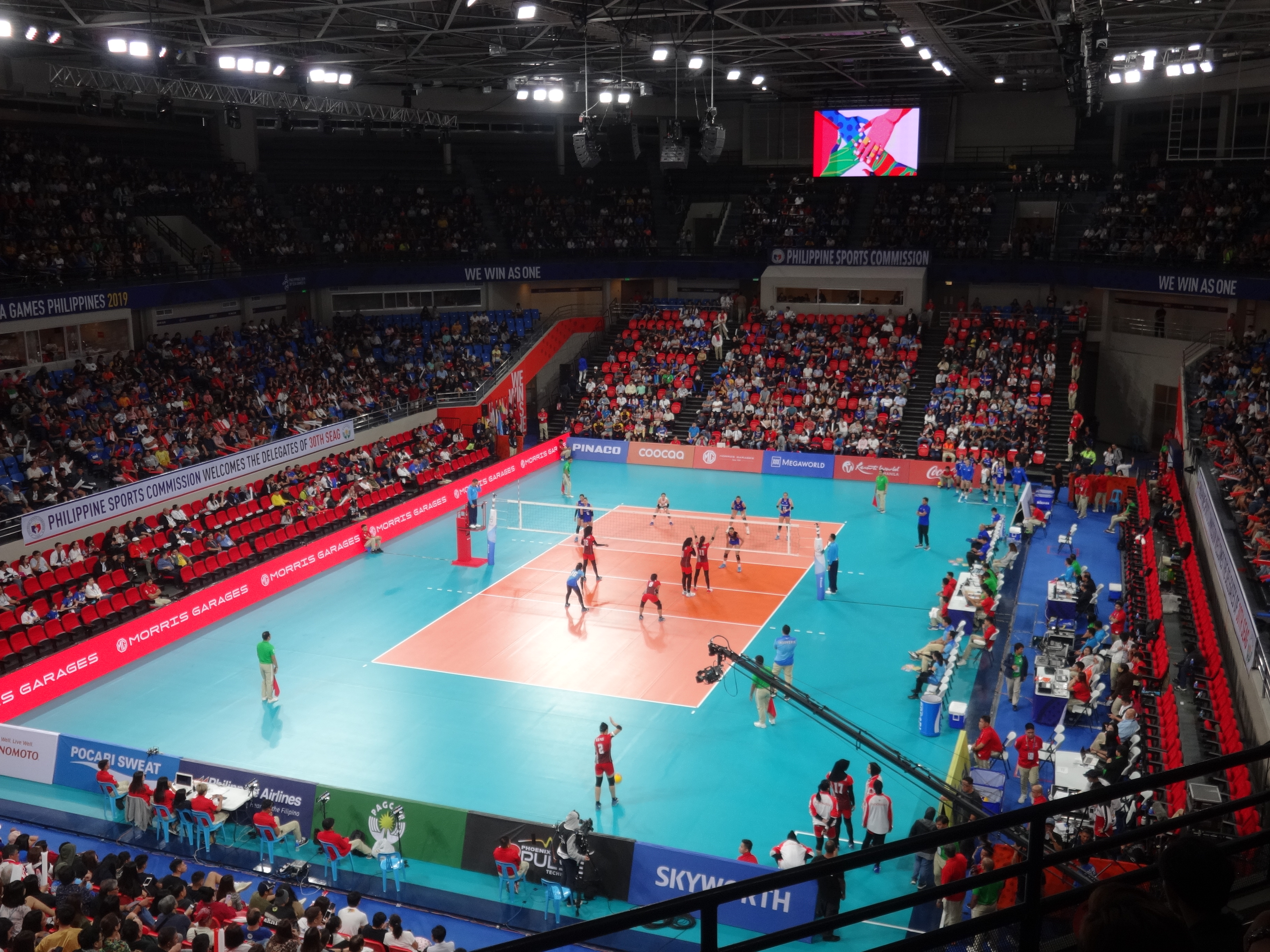
The Philsports Arena, the venue of the men's volleyball tournament.

- Cambodia
- Indonesia
- Myanmar
- Philippines
- Singapore
- Thailand
- Vietnam

== Results ==
=== Preliminary round ===
==== Group A ====
Pos	Team	Pld	W	L	Pts	SW	SL	SR	SPW	SPL	SPR	Qualification
1	Thailand	2	2	0	6	6	1	6.000	175	122	1.434	Semifinals
2	Myanmar	2	1	1	3	3	3	1.000	124	138	0.899	Semifinals
3	Singapore	2	0	2	0	1	6	0.167	137	176	0.778	5th–7th places

Date	Time		Score		Set 1	Set 2	Set 3	Set 4	Set 5	Total	Report
2 Dec	13:00	Singapore	1–3	Thailand	27–25	13–25	16–25	18–25		74–100	Report
4 Dec	13:00	Myanmar	3–0	Singapore	26–24	25–21	25–18			76–63	Report
6 Dec	13:00	Thailand	3–0	Myanmar	25–14	25–20	25–14			75–48	Report

==== Group B ====
Pos	Team	Pld	W	L	Pts	SW	SL	SR	SPW	SPL	SPR	Qualification
1	Indonesia	3	3	0	9	9	0	MAX	242	206	1.175	Semifinals
2	Philippines	3	2	1	6	6	3	2.000	227	196	1.158	Semifinals
3	Cambodia	3	1	2	2	3	8	0.375	240	274	0.876	5th place match
4	Vietnam	3	0	3	1	2	9	0.222	226	259	0.873	5th–7th places

Date	Time		Score		Set 1	Set 2	Set 3	Set 4	Set 5	Total	Report
2 Dec	15:30	Vietnam	0–3	Indonesia	20–25	22–25	21–25			63–75	Report
2 Dec	18:00	Philippines	3–0	Cambodia	29–27	25–17	25–17			79–61	Report
4 Dec	15:30	Cambodia	0–3	Indonesia	20–25	17–25	33–35			70–85	Report
4 Dec	18:00	Philippines	3–0	Vietnam	25–20	25–21	25–12			75–53	Report
6 Dec	15:30	Vietnam	2–3	Cambodia	25–20	24–26	25–21	25–27	11–15	110–109	Report
6 Dec	18:00	Indonesia	3–0	Philippines	25–23	32–30	25–20			82–73	Report

=== Final round ===
Semifinals; 8 December
A1	Thailand	2
B2	Philippines	3
B1	Indonesia	3
A2	Myanmar	0

Gold medal match 10 December
B2	Philippines	0
B1	Indonesia	3
Bronze medal match 10 December
A1	Thailand	3
A2	Myanmar	0

5th–7th place play-off 8 December			Fifth place match 10 December
			B3	Cambodia	0
A3	Singapore	0	B4	Vietnam	3
B4	Vietnam	3

==== 5th–7th place play-off ====
Date	Time		Score		Set 1	Set 2	Set 3	Set 4	Set 5	Total	Report
8 Dec	13:00	Singapore	0–3	Vietnam	16–25	20–25	19–25			55–75	Report

==== Semifinals ====
Date	Time		Score		Set 1	Set 2	Set 3	Set 4	Set 5	Total	Report
8 Dec	15:30	Indonesia	3–0	Myanmar	25–19	25–23	25–15			75–57	Report
8 Dec	18:00	Thailand	2–3	Philippines	25–17	20–25	25–23	25–27	15–17	110–109	Report

==== 5th place match ====
Date	Time		Score		Set 1	Set 2	Set 3	Set 4	Set 5	Total	Report
10 Dec	13:00	Cambodia	0–3	Vietnam	15–25	20–25	22–25			57–75	Report

==== Bronze medal match ====
Date	Time		Score		Set 1	Set 2	Set 3	Set 4	Set 5	Total	Report
10 Dec	15:30	Thailand	3–0	Myanmar	25–23	25–16	25–20			75–59	Report

==== Gold medal match ====
Date	Time		Score		Set 1	Set 2	Set 3	Set 4	Set 5	Total	Report
10 Dec	18:00	Philippines	0–3	Indonesia	21–25	25–27	17–25			63–77	Report

== Final standings ==
Rank	Team
1st place, gold medalist(s)	Indonesia
2nd place, silver medalist(s)	Philippines
3rd place, bronze medalist(s)	Thailand
4	Myanmar
5	Vietnam
6	Cambodia
7	Singapore

== See also ==
- Women's tournament
