= 2016 South East Asian Junior Men's Volleyball Championships =

2016 SEA Men's U20 Championships
Tournament details
- Host country: Myanmar
- Dates: 02-06 July
- Teams: 7
- Venue: 1 (in 1 host city)

The 2016 South East Asian Men's U20 Volleyball Championships was held in Nay Pyi Taw, Myanmar from 2 to 6 July 2016. 7 teams entered for this tournament.

== Pools composition ==
Pool A	Pool B
Thailand; New Zealand; Singapore; Myanmar (team B)	Myanmar (team A) (host); Indonesia; Maldives

== Preliminary round ==
- All times are UTC+06:30.

=== Pool A ===
Pos	Team	Pld	W	L	Pts	SW	SL	SR	SPW	SPL	SPR	Qualification
1	Thailand	3	3	0	9	9	0	MAX	225	125	1.800	Semifinals
2	Myanmar-B	3	2	1	6	6	4	1.500	223	205	1.088	Semifinals
3	New Zealand	3	1	2	2	4	8	0.500	226	272	0.831	
4	Singapore	3	0	3	1	2	9	0.222	188	260	0.723	

Date	Time		Score		Set 1	Set 2	Set 3	Set 4	Set 5	Total	Report
02 Jul	12:30	Myanmar-B	3–0	Singapore	25–15	25–23	25–14	–	–	75–52	
02 Jul	14:30	Thailand	3–0	New Zealand	25–7	25–22	25–9	–	–	75–38	
03 Jul	12:00	Myanmar-B	3–1	New Zealand	25–27	25–21	25–19	25–11	–	100–78	
03 Jul	14:00	Singapore	0–3	Thailand	13–25	12–25	14–25	–	–	39–75	
04 Jul	12:00	Myanmar-B	0–3	Thailand	16–25	17–25	15–25	–	–	48–75	
04 Jul	14:00	New Zealand	3–2	Singapore	25–18	22–25	23–25	25–23	15–6	110–97	

=== Pool B ===
Pos	Team	Pld	W	L	Pts	SW	SL	SR	SPW	SPL	SPR	Qualification
1	Myanmar-A	2	2	0	6	6	1	6.000	97	81	1.198	Semifinals
2	Indonesia	2	1	1	3	4	3	1.333	156	138	1.130	Semifinals
3	Maldives	2	0	2	0	0	6	0.000	41	75	0.547	

Date	Time		Score		Set 1	Set 2	Set 3	Set 4	Set 5	Total	Report
02 Jul	16:30	Indonesia	3–0	Maldives	25–16	25–9	25–16	–	–	75–41	
03 Jul	16:00	Myanmar-A	3–0	Maldives	–	–	–	–	–	0–0	
04 Jul	16:00	Myanmar-A	3–1	Indonesia	25–21	25–11	21–25	26–24	–	97–81	

== Final round ==
- All times are UTC+06:30.

Semifinals
05 July – Wunna Theikdi
Thailand	3
Indonesia	0
05 July – Wunna Theikdi
Myanmar-A	3
Myanmar-B	0

Final
06 July – Wunna Theikdi
Thailand	3
Myanmar-A	0
3rd place
06 July – Wunna Theikdi
Myanmar-B	1
Indonesia	3

=== Semifinals ===
Date	Time		Score		Set 1	Set 2	Set 3	Set 4	Set 5	Total	Report
05 July	14:00	Thailand	3–0	Indonesia	25–15	25–18	25–21	–	–	75–54	
05 July	16:00	Myanmar-A	3–0	Myanmar-B	25–18	25–21	25–17	–	–	75–56	

=== 5th place ===
Date	Time		Score		Set 1	Set 2	Set 3	Set 4	Set 5	Total	Report
05 July	12:00	New Zealand	3–0	Maldives	25–12	25–17	25–16	–	–	75–45	

=== 3rd place ===
Date	Time		Score		Set 1	Set 2	Set 3	Set 4	Set 5	Total	Report
06 July	12:00	Myanmar-B	1–3	Indonesia	24–26	26–24	20–25	25–27	–	95–102	

=== Final ===
Date	Time		Score		Set 1	Set 2	Set 3	Set 4	Set 5	Total	Report
06 July	14:00	Thailand	3–0	Myanmar-A	28–26	25–22	25–18	–	–	78–66	

== Final standing ==
Rank	Team
1st place, gold medalist(s)	Thailand
2nd place, silver medalist(s)	Myanmar-A
3rd place, bronze medalist(s)	Indonesia
4	Myanmar-B
5	New Zealand
6	Maldives
7	Singapore

== Awards ==
- MVP: (Thailand) Kantapat Koonmee
