= SEA V.League Challenge =

Southeast Asian national volleyball tournament

- Most recent season or competition: 2024 SEA V.League Challenge
- Sport: Volleyball
- Founded: 2024; 2 years ago
- First season: 2024
- No. of teams: 4
- Countries: Cambodia; Laos; Malaysia; Singapore
- Continent: AVC (Southeast Asia)
- Most recent champion: Cambodia (1st title)
- Most titles: Cambodia (1 title)
- Promotion to: SEA V.League
- Website: SEA V.League

The Southeast Asian Volleyball League Challenge, also known as SEA V.League Challenge, is a series of international volleyball tournaments featuring teams from Southeast Asia.

== History ==
The SEA V.League, formerly known as ASEAN Grand Prix, was first held in 2019 and featured four nations: Indonesia, the Philippines, Thailand, and Vietnam. As of 2023, some other nations in Southeast Asia beside the aforementioned ones expressed their interest in participating in the tournament. The Southeast Asian Volleyball Association reported that a new tournament would be created, following the same project of Nations League/Challenger Cup by FIVB.

The creation of SEA V.League Challenge was announced in early 2024, which included four other national teams in Southeast Asia (Cambodia, Laos, Malaysia, and Singapore). Men's tournament will make inaugural edition in 2024, while women's tournament has not yet been scheduled. The winner of SEA V.League Challenge will earn the right to participate in the next edition of SEA V.League, replacing the last placed team in the recent edition of SEA V.League.

== Summary ==
Year	Host				
Year	Host	Champions	Runners-up	3rd place	4th place
2024	(Cambodia); Phnom Penh	Cambodia	Malaysia	Singapore	Laos

== Participating nations ==
Team	2024 (Cambodia)	Total
Cambodia	1st	1
Laos	4th	1
Malaysia	2nd	1
Singapore	3rd	1

== Debut of teams ==
Year	Debutants	Total
2024	Cambodia	4
2024	Laos	4
2024	Malaysia	4
2024	Singapore	4

== Medals summary ==
Rank	Nation	Gold	Silver	Bronze	Total
1	Cambodia	1	0	0	1
2	Malaysia	0	1	0	1
3	Singapore	0	0	1	1
Totals (3 entries)		1	1	1	3

== SEA V.League qualifier ==
Year	Remaining Teams				V.League Challenge Winner
2023	Indonesia	Philippines	Thailand	Vietnam	—N/a
2024	Indonesia	Philippines	Thailand	Vietnam	Cambodia ▲
