= Volleyball at the 2023 SEA Games – Men's tournament =

Men's volleyball tournament at the 2023 SEA Games
- Venue: Olympic Complex Indoor Main Hall
- Dates: 3–8 May
- Nations: 8

Medalists
gold medal	Indonesia
silver medal	Cambodia
bronze medal	Vietnam

The men's volleyball tournament at the 2023 SEA Games was held at the Olympic Complex Indoor Main Hall in Phnom Penh from 3 to 8 May 2023.

== Draw ==
The draw for the men's volleyball tournament was held on 5 April 2023 in Phnom Penh. Cambodia as host chose the group which it wanted to be allocated in.

The Philippines was initially omitted from the draw owing to a clerical error. The country intended to compete and filed an appeal against their omission. Host Cambodia agrees to approve the Philippines' participation if at least five associations, including itself and the Philippines, approve of the motion. No redraw was made and the Philippines were belatedly allocated to Group A.

== Participating nations ==
- Cambodia
- Indonesia
- Malaysia
- Myanmar
- Philippines
- Singapore
- Thailand
- Vietnam

=== Squads ===
Cambodia	Indonesia	Malaysia	Myanmar
Khim Sovandara; Chheang Phearoth; Born Narith; Pin Sarun; Din Siden; Voeurn Veasna; Soeurn Heng; Mouen Menglaiy; Kuon Mom; Phol Ratanak; Soun Channaro; Mourn Nimul; Phol Phaniet; An Sokheang	Henry Ade Novian; Boy Arnez Arabi; Hendra Kurniawan; Muhammad Malizi; Yuda Mardiansyah Putra; Fahry Septian Putratama; Rivan Nurmulki; Hernanda Zulfi; Farhan Halim; Dio Zulfikri; Agil Angga Anggara; Fahreza Rakha Abhinaya; Doni Haryono; Nizar Julfikar Munawar	Ranjit Ramu; Mohd Asri bin Muharia; Lee Yeh Seng; Kang Yuan Shing; Shon Ngiap Shyang; Lim Soo Yuee; Sim Zi Qin; Ryan Tan Teng Wei; Chia You Jing; Sim Jian Qin; Mohd Halim Muhammad Hafizuddin; Abdul Hattam Shahrizan; Madzlan Muhammad Fahmi; Shamsaimon Khairol Shazrime	Kaung Kin Soe; Saw Vitsatar Htoo; Shine Thu Aung; Zaw Lwin Tun; Hlaing Wai Kyaw; Aung Thu; Zung Myat Tun; Kaung Khant Kyaw; Nay Htet Ko; Chan Nyein Zaw; Ya Htike Wai; Myo Min Oo
Philippines	Singapore	Thailand	Vietnam
Vince Mangulabnan; Kim Dayandante; Vince Lorenzo; Jade Disquitado; Michael Raymund Vicente; Jayvee Sumagaysay; Steve Rotter; Jay Rack Dela Noche; Leo Ordiales; Joshua Umandal; Peng Taguibolos; Lloyd Josafat; Cyrus Justin De Guzman; Manuel Sumanguid III	Ang Jin Yuan; Lee Zi Bin; Chew Min Feng; Kelvin Chua Hong Yao; Teddy Teo Zi Hao; Edwin Lee Teck Kai; Shergill Ajay Singh; Tian Sheet Khuen; Muhammad Aniq Aiman bin Shaugi; Avan Cheah Wei Jie; Peter Wong Li En; Jordan Ryan Wong; Wong Chang Wei; Nicolas Law Kai Jie	Amorntep Konhan; Anut Promchan; Napadet Bhinijdee; Siwadon Sanhatham; Thanathat Taweerat; Mawin Maneewong; Tanapat Charoensuk; Kantapat Koonmee; Saranchit Charoensuk; Sutthiphong Donlakkham; Chayut Khongrueng; Anurak Phanram; Kissada Nilsawai; Panupong Khumpumee	Huỳnh Trung Trực; Trịnh Duy Phúc; Giang Văn Đức; Quản Trọng Nghĩa; Nguyễn Văn Quốc Duy; Nguyễn Văn Nam; Trần Duy Tuyến; Từ Thanh Thuận; Nguyễn Thanh Hải; Vũ Ngọc Hoàng; Đinh Văn Duy; Nguyễn Ngọc Thuân; Dương Văn Tiên; Cù Văn Hoàn

== Preliminary round ==
- All times are Cambodia Standard Time (UTC+07:00).

=== Group A ===
Pos	Team	Pld	W	L	Pts	SW	SL	SR	SPW	SPL	SPR	Qualification
1	Indonesia	3	3	0	9	9	0	MAX	229	159	1.440	Semifinals
2	Cambodia (H)	3	2	1	6	6	3	2.000	205	181	1.133	Semifinals
3	Singapore	3	1	2	3	3	6	0.500	173	216	0.801	5th–8th semifinals
4	Philippines	3	0	3	0	0	9	0.000	174	225	0.773	5th–8th semifinals

(H) Host

Date	Time		Score		Set 1	Set 2	Set 3	Set 4	Set 5	Total	Report
3 May	14:30	Philippines	0–3	Indonesia	18–25	18–25	23–25			59–75	
3 May	19:30	Cambodia	3–0	Singapore	25–14	25–19	25–20			75–53	
4 May	17:00	Singapore	0–3	Indonesia	27–29	8–25	10–25			45–79	
4 May	19:30	Cambodia	3–0	Philippines	25–18	25–18	25–17			75–53	
6 May	17:00	Philippines	0–3	Singapore	23–25	21–25	18–25			62–75	
6 May	19:30	Indonesia	3–0	Cambodia	25–18	25–21	25–16			75–55	

=== Group B ===
Pos	Team	Pld	W	L	Pts	SW	SL	SR	SPW	SPL	SPR	Qualification
1	Thailand	3	3	0	9	9	1	9.000	248	201	1.234	Semifinals
2	Vietnam	3	2	1	6	7	3	2.333	238	212	1.123	Semifinals
3	Malaysia	3	1	2	3	3	7	0.429	215	230	0.935	5th–8th semifinals
4	Myanmar	3	0	3	0	1	9	0.111	189	247	0.765	5th–8th semifinals

Date	Time		Score		Set 1	Set 2	Set 3	Set 4	Set 5	Total	Report
3 May	12:00	Malaysia	0–3	Thailand	20–25	17–25	20–25			57–75	
3 May	17:00	Myanmar	0–3	Vietnam	14–25	21–25	18–25			53–75	
4 May	12:00	Malaysia	3–1	Myanmar	22–25	25–21	25–14	25–20		97–80	
4 May	14:30	Thailand	3–1	Vietnam	23–25	25–17	25–23	25–23		98–88	
6 May	12:00	Myanmar	0–3	Thailand	18–25	21–25	17–25			56–75	
6 May	14:30	Vietnam	3–0	Malaysia	25–18	25–20	25–23			75–61	

== Final round ==
- All times are Cambodia Standard Time (UTC+07:00).

=== 5th–8th places ===
5th–8th semifinals
7 May
Singapore	3
Myanmar	0
7 May
Malaysia	2
Philippines	3

5th place match
8 May
Singapore	1
Philippines	3
7th place match
8 May
Myanmar	3
Malaysia	2

==== 5th–8th semifinals ====
Date	Time		Score		Set 1	Set 2	Set 3	Set 4	Set 5	Total	Report
7 May	12:00	Singapore	3–0	Myanmar	25–23	27–25	25–22			77–70	
7 May	14:30	Malaysia	2–3	Philippines	19–25	25–20	21–25	26–24	15–17	106–111	

==== 7th place match ====
Date	Time		Score		Set 1	Set 2	Set 3	Set 4	Set 5	Total	Report
8 May	12:00	Myanmar	3–2	Malaysia	25–22	25–17	23–25	18–25	15–13	106–102	

==== 5th place match ====
Date	Time		Score		Set 1	Set 2	Set 3	Set 4	Set 5	Total	Report
8 May	14:30	Singapore	1–3	Philippines	23–25	25–23	22–25	23–25		93–98	

=== Final four ===
Semifinals
7 May
Indonesia	3
Vietnam	0
7 May
Thailand	2
Cambodia	3

Gold medal match
8 May
Indonesia	3
Cambodia	0
Bronze medal match
8 May
Vietnam	3
Thailand	0

==== Semifinals ====
Date	Time		Score		Set 1	Set 2	Set 3	Set 4	Set 5	Total	Report
7 May	17:00	Indonesia	3–0	Vietnam	30–28	25–19	25–18			80–65	
7 May	19:30	Thailand	2–3	Cambodia	25–18	25–21	21–25	16–25	10–15	97–104	

==== Bronze medal match ====
Date	Time		Score		Set 1	Set 2	Set 3	Set 4	Set 5	Total	Report
8 May	17:00	Vietnam	3–0	Thailand	25–18	25–20	25–20			75–58	

==== Gold medal match ====
Date	Time		Score		Set 1	Set 2	Set 3	Set 4	Set 5	Total	Report
8 May	19:30	Indonesia	3–0	Cambodia	25–21	25–10	25–15			75–46	

== Final standings ==
Rank	Team
1st place, gold medalist(s)	Indonesia
2nd place, silver medalist(s)	Cambodia
3rd place, bronze medalist(s)	Vietnam
4	Thailand
5	Philippines
6	Singapore
7	Myanmar
8	Malaysia

== See also ==
- Volleyball at the 2023 SEA Games – Women's tournament
