= 2026 SEA Men's V Cup =

Southeast Asian volleyball tournament

- Official logo
- Association: Southeast Asian Volleyball Association
- League: SEA V Cup
- Sport: Volleyball
- Duration: 15–26 July
- Matches: 22
- Teams: 6

First Leg
- Season champions: Cambodia
- Runners-up: Indonesia
- Season MVP: (Cambodia) Voeurn Veasna

Second Leg
- Season champions: Vietnam
- Runners-up: Thailand
- Season MVP: (Vietnam) Nguyễn Ngọc Thuân

Seasons
- ← 2025

The 2026 SEA Men's V Cup was the fourth edition of the SEA V Cup, contested by six men's national teams that are members of the Southeast Asian Volleyball Association (SAVA), the sport's regional governing body affiliated to the Asian Volleyball Confederation (AVC). From 2023 to 2025, the SEA V Cup was known as the SEA V.League. Myanmar made its debut and became the sixth team of the tournament.

The first leg took place in Candon, Ilocos Sur, the Philippines, from 15 to 19 July, while the second leg took place in Jakarta, Indonesia, from 22 to 26 July.

Cambodia and Vietnam, the winners of each leg secured qualification spots for the 2027 AVC Men's Volleyball Cup.

== Teams ==
- Cambodia
- Indonesia
- Myanmar
- Philippines
- Thailand
- Vietnam

== Venues ==
First Leg	Second Leg
Candon, Philippines	Jakarta, Indonesia
Candon City Arena	Jakarta International Velodrome
Capacity: 8,000	Capacity: 3,500

== Pool standing procedure ==
1. Total number of victories (matches won, matches lost)
2. In the event of a tie, the following first tiebreaker will apply: The teams will be ranked by the most points gained per match as follows:
  - Match won 3–0 or 3–1: 3 points for the winner, 0 points for the loser
  - Match won 3–2: 2 points for the winner, 1 point for the loser
  - Match forfeited: 3 points for the winner, 0 points (0–25, 0–25, 0–25) for the loser
3. If teams are still tied after examining the number of victories and points gained, then the SAVA will examine the results to break the tie in the following order:
  - Set quotient: if two or more teams are tied on the number of points gained, they will be ranked by the quotient resulting from the division of the number of all set won by the number of all sets lost.
  - Points quotient: if the tie persists based on the set quotient, the teams will be ranked by the quotient resulting from the division of all points scored by the total of points lost during all sets.
  - If the tie persists based on the point quotient, the tie will be broken based on the team that won the match of the Round Robin Phase between the tied teams. When the tie in point quotient is between three or more teams, these teams are ranked taking into consideration only the matches involving the teams in question.

== First leg ==
- All times are Philippine Standard Time (UTC+08:00).

=== Preliminary round ===
==== Pool A ====
Pos	Team	Pld	W	L	Pts	SW	SL	SR	SPW	SPL	SPR	Qualification
1	Indonesia	2	2	0	6	6	0	MAX	152	125	1.216	Semifinals
2	Cambodia	2	1	1	2	3	5	0.600	172	181	0.950	Semifinals
3	Philippines (H)	2	0	2	1	2	6	0.333	174	192	0.906	5th place match

Source: SAVA
(H) Host

Date	Time		Score		Set 1	Set 2	Set 3	Set 4	Set 5	Total	Attd	Report
15 Jul	17:30	Philippines	2–3	Cambodia	23–25	30–28	20–25	25–22	8–15	106–115	1,728	Report
16 Jul	17:30	Indonesia	3–0	Cambodia	25–18	25–18	25–21			75–57	950	Report
17 Jul	17:30	Indonesia	3–0	Philippines	25–20	25–23	27–25			77–68	2,100	Report

==== Pool B ====
Pos	Team	Pld	W	L	Pts	SW	SL	SR	SPW	SPL	SPR	Qualification
1	Thailand	2	2	0	6	6	1	6.000	176	141	1.248	Semifinals
2	Vietnam	2	1	1	3	4	3	1.333	166	161	1.031	Semifinals
3	Myanmar	2	0	2	0	0	6	0.000	110	150	0.733	5th place match

Source: SAVA

Date	Time		Score		Set 1	Set 2	Set 3	Set 4	Set 5	Total	Attd	Report
15 Jul	14:00	Thailand	3–1	Vietnam	33–31	18–25	25–19	25–16		101–91	419	Report
16 Jul	14:00	Thailand	3–0	Myanmar	25–15	25–16	25–19			75–50	300	Report
17 Jul	14:00	Myanmar	0–3	Vietnam	18–25	23–25	19–25			60–75	250	Report

=== Final round ===
==== 5th place match ====
Date	Time		Score		Set 1	Set 2	Set 3	Set 4	Set 5	Total	Attd	Report
18 Jul	13:00	Philippines	3–0	Myanmar	25–21	28–26	25–22			78–69	750	Report

==== Final four ====
Semifinals
18 July
Indonesia	3
Vietnam	0
18 July
Thailand	1
Cambodia	3

Final
19 July
Indonesia	2
Cambodia	3
3rd place match
19 July
Vietnam	1
Thailand	3

===== Semifinals =====
Date	Time		Score		Set 1	Set 2	Set 3	Set 4	Set 5	Total	Attd	Report
18 Jul	16:00	Thailand	1–3	Cambodia	21–25	25–16	23–25	17–25		86–91	1,600	Report
18 Jul	20:00	Indonesia	3–0	Vietnam	25–22	25–20	25–22			75–64	1,760	Report

===== 3rd place match =====
Date	Time		Score		Set 1	Set 2	Set 3	Set 4	Set 5	Total	Attd	Report
19 Jul	14:00	Vietnam	1–3	Thailand	25–23	28–30	20–25	26–28		99–106		

===== Final =====
Date	Time		Score		Set 1	Set 2	Set 3	Set 4	Set 5	Total	Attd	Report
19 Jul	17:30	Indonesia	2–3	Cambodia	23–25	26–28	25–23	25–22	11–15	110–113		

=== Final standing ===
Rank	Team
1st place, gold medalist(s)	Cambodia
2nd place, silver medalist(s)	Indonesia
3rd place, bronze medalist(s)	Thailand
4	Vietnam
5	Philippines
6	Myanmar

2026 SEA V Cup – First Leg champions

Cambodia
1st title

14–man roster
Khim Sovandara, Pin Sarun, Voeurn Veasna, Soeurn Heng, Thy Menghuong, Kuon Mom, Phol Ratanak, Soun Channaro (c), Keo Srenglyhour, Mourn Nimul, Chan Veasna, Kheng Thona, Un Sovannreach, Ouk Ratha
Head coach
Sameth Nouv

=== Awards ===
- Most valuable player
  Voeurn Veasna (CAM)
- Best setter
  Soun Channaro (CAM)
- Best outside spikers
  Farhan Halim (INA)
  Voeurn Veasna (CAM)
- Best middle blockers
  Trương Thế Khải (VIE)
  Hendra Kurniawan (INA)
- Best opposite spiker
  Napadet Bhinijdee (THA)
- Best libero
  Josh Ybañez (PHI)

== Second leg ==
- All times are Western Indonesia Time (UTC+07:00).

=== Preliminary round ===
==== Pool A ====
Pos	Team	Pld	W	L	Pts	SW	SL	SR	SPW	SPL	SPR	Qualification
1	Indonesia (H)	2	2	0	6	6	1	6.000	174	135	1.289	Semifinals
2	Cambodia	2	1	1	3	3	3	1.000	132	141	0.936	Semifinals
3	Philippines	2	0	2	0	1	6	0.167	144	174	0.828	5th place match

Source: SAVA
(H) Host

Date	Time		Score		Set 1	Set 2	Set 3	Set 4	Set 5	Total	Attd	Report
22 Jul	19:00	Indonesia	3–0	Cambodia	26–24	25–15	25–17			76–56	1,500	P2 Report
23 Jul	19:00	Philippines	0–3	Cambodia	20–25	21–25	24–26			65–76	200	P2 Report
24 Jul	19:00	Indonesia	3–1	Philippines	25–18	25–17	23–25	25–19		98–79	3,000	P2 Report

==== Pool B ====
Pos	Team	Pld	W	L	Pts	SW	SL	SR	SPW	SPL	SPR	Qualification
1	Thailand	2	2	0	5	6	2	3.000	178	148	1.203	Semifinals
2	Vietnam	2	1	1	4	5	3	1.667	176	167	1.054	Semifinals
3	Myanmar	2	0	2	0	0	6	0.000	111	150	0.740	5th place match

Source: SAVA

Date	Time		Score		Set 1	Set 2	Set 3	Set 4	Set 5	Total	Attd	Report
22 Jul	15:30	Thailand	3–0	Myanmar	25–20	25–9	25–18			75–47	500	P2 Report
23 Jul	15:30	Thailand	3–2	Vietnam	23–25	15–25	25–18	25–21	15–12	103–101	300	P2 Report
24 Jul	15:30	Myanmar	0–3	Vietnam	19–25	23–25	22–25			64–75	1,300	P2 Report

=== Final round ===
==== 5th place match ====
Date	Time		Score		Set 1	Set 2	Set 3	Set 4	Set 5	Total	Attd	Report
25 Jul	12:00	Philippines	3–0	Myanmar	28–26	25–17	25–23			78–66	200	P2 Report

==== Final four ====
Semifinals
25 July
Indonesia	1
Vietnam	3
25 July
Thailand	3
Cambodia	0

Final
26 July
Vietnam	3
Thailand	2
3rd place match
26 July
Indonesia	3
Cambodia	1

===== Semifinals =====
Date	Time		Score		Set 1	Set 2	Set 3	Set 4	Set 5	Total	Attd	Report
25 Jul	15:30	Thailand	3–0	Cambodia	25–18	25–19	25–18			75–55	1,800	P2 Report
25 Jul	19:00	Indonesia	1–3	Vietnam	25–22	22–25	19–25	18–25		84–97	3,000	P2 Report

===== 3rd place match =====
Date	Time		Score		Set 1	Set 2	Set 3	Set 4	Set 5	Total	Attd	Report
26 Jul	15:30	Indonesia	3–1	Cambodia	25–18	19–25	25–20	26–24		95–87	3,000	P2 Report

===== Final =====
Date	Time		Score		Set 1	Set 2	Set 3	Set 4	Set 5	Total	Attd	Report
26 Jul	19:00	Vietnam	3–2	Thailand	22–25	25–23	25–19	15–25	15–10	102–102	2,500	P2 Report

=== Final standing ===
Rank	Team
1st place, gold medalist(s)	Vietnam
2nd place, silver medalist(s)	Thailand
3rd place, bronze medalist(s)	Indonesia
4	Cambodia
5	Philippines
6	Myanmar

2026 SEA V Cup – Second Leg champions

Vietnam
1st title

14–man roster
Đinh Văn Duy, Trịnh Duy Phúc (c), Dương Văn Tiên, Trần Minh Đức, Tăng Ngọc Hiếu, Trần Duy Tuyến, Trương Thế Khải, Phạm Thanh Tùng, Đinh Văn Phương, Nguyễn Ngọc Thuân, Phạm Quốc Dư, Trần Hoài Phương, Cao Đức Hoàng, Bùi Xuân Tiến
Head coach
(Italy) Federico Rampazzo

=== Awards ===
- Most valuable player
  Nguyễn Ngọc Thuân (VIE)
- Best setter
  Boonyarid Wongtorn (THA)
- Best outside spikers
  Nguyễn Ngọc Thuân (VIE)
  Voeurn Veasna (CAM)
- Best middle blockers
  Trần Duy Tuyến (VIE)
  Hendra Kurniawan (INA)
- Best opposite spiker
  Napadet Bhinijdee (THA)
- Best libero
  Pakkapong Kwangnok (THA)

== Results and combined standings ==
=== Summary ===
Leg	Date	Location	Champions	Runners-up	Third place
1	15-19 July 2026	(Philippines) Candon	Cambodia (1)	Indonesia (4)	Thailand (3)
2	22-26 July 2026	(Indonesia) Jakarta	Vietnam (1)	Thailand (2)	Indonesia (1)

== See also ==
- 2026 SEA Women's V Cup
