= Kuon Mom =

Cambodian volleyball player (born 1998)

Kuon Mom គួន ម៉ុម
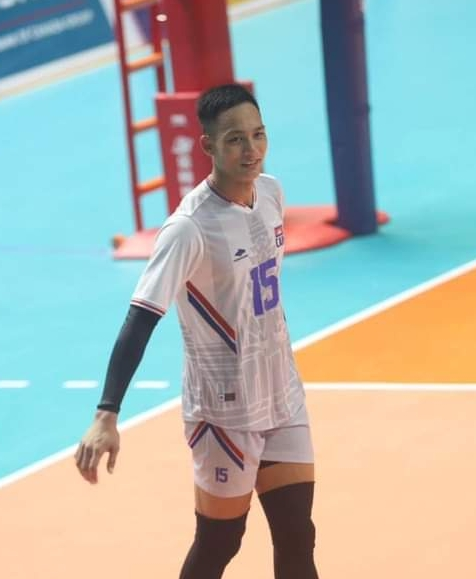
- Mom during the 2023 SEA Games

Personal information
- Full name: Kuon Mom
- Nationality: Cambodian
- Born: 10 June 1998 (age 28); Takeo, Cambodia
- Hometown: Phnom Penh, Cambodia
- Height: 1.98 m (6 ft 6 in)
- Weight: 85 kg (187 lb)
- Spike: 335 cm (132 in)
- Block: 332 cm (131 in)

Volleyball information
- Position: Outside Hitter
- Current club: (Cambodia) Visakha VC
- Number: 15 (national team); 15 (club)

Career
Years	Teams
2015–2018	(Cambodia) Ministry of Interior
2018–2020	(Cambodia) Visakha VC
2020	(Indonesia) Jakarta Garuda Jaya
2020–2025	(Cambodia) Visakha VC
2023–2024	(Vietnam) Lavie Long An (loan)
2025–present	(Vietnam) Hà Nội VC

National team
2019–present	Cambodia
Medal record
Men's volleyball
Representing Cambodia
SEA Games
Silver medal – second place	2023 Cambodia	Team
Bronze medal – third place	2021 Vietnam	Team
SEA V Cup
Gold medal – first place	2026 Candon	Team

Kuon Mom (Khmer: គួន ម៉ុម [kuən mom]; born 10 June 1998) is a Cambodian volleyball player. He is currently playing for Visakha VC. He is well known for his strong hitting speed in Cambodia's volleyball.

== Career ==
In 2015, he is scouted by Ministry of Interior's coach after his good performance at his high school and signed him. Three years later, he joined Visakha Volleyball Club. At the beginning of 2020, he is the first Cambodian to play overseas, joining Garuda Jakarta before returning to Cambodia.

He made his international debut at the 2019 SEA Games and was part of his country's success, winning a bronze medal at the 2021 SEA Games, and a silver medal on his home soil at the 2023 SEA Games.

== Personal life ==
He is currently married and has a son.

== Honours ==
Domestic
Competitions	Medal	Event
2022 Hun Sen Volleyball Championship	Gold	Team
2023 Hun Sen Volleyball Championship	Silver	Team
2024 National Games of Cambodia	Gold	Team

International
SEA Games
Year	Place	Medal	Event
2021	Vietnam	Bronze	Team
2023	Cambodia	Silver	Team
SEA V Cup
Year	Place	Medal	Event
2026 (first leg)	Philippines	Gold	Team
