= Soun Channaro =

Cambodian volleyball player (born 1995)

Soun Channaro សួន ចាន់ណារ៉ូ

Personal information
- Full name: Soun Channaro
- Nationality: Cambodian
- Born: 27 June 1995 (age 31)
- Hometown: Phnom Penh, Cambodia
- Height: 1.90 m (6 ft 3 in)
- Weight: 90 kg (198 lb)
- Spike: 315 cm (124 in)
- Block: 309 cm (122 in)

Volleyball information
- Position: Setter
- Current club: Commissariat of Svay Rieng Municipal Police
- Number: 17 (national team); 17 (club)

Career
Years	Teams
2012–?	(Cambodia) RCAF No. 3
?–2018	(Cambodia) UYFC Prey Veng
2018–2024	(Cambodia) Visakha VC
2024–Present	(Cambodia) Commissariat of Svay Rieng Municipal Police

National team
2015–2023	Cambodia
Medal record
Men's volleyball
Representing Cambodia
Southeast Asian Games
Silver medal – second place	2023 Cambodia	Team
Bronze medal – third place	2021 Vietnam	Team
SEA V Cup
Gold medal – first place	2026 Candon	Team

Soun Channaro (Khmer: សួន ចាន់ណារ៉ូ, romanized: Suŏn Chănnaro [suən can.naː.roː]) is a Cambodian volleyball player. He is currently playing for Visakha VC. He is well known for being one of the best setter in Cambodia's volleyball.

== Club career ==
He started to play volleyball during 2012 for RCAF No. 3 before joining UYFC Prey Veng. He won a gold medal at the first National Games in 2016 In 2018, he joined Visakha Volleyball Club and won a gold medal at the 2nd National Games. He also won gold medal at Hun Sen Volleyball Championship in 2022 and finished the same event as runner-up in 2023.

== International career ==
For the national team, he made his debut in 2015 and competed in 4 SEA Games editions, in 2017, 2019, 2021, and 2023. During those periods, he captained the team and won a bronze medal in 2022 and a silver medal in 2023, before he retired after the 2023 SEA Games.

== Personal life ==
He is currently married and has a son.

== Honours ==
Volleyball
Domestic
Competitions	Place	Medal	Event
1st National Games 2016	Cambodia	Gold	Volleyball team
Cambodian Beer League 2017	Cambodia	Gold	Volleyball team
LEO Volleyball Championship in 2017	Cambodia	Gold	Volleyball team
2nd National Games 2018	Cambodia	Gold	Volleyball team
Hun Sen Volleyball Championship 2022	Cambodia	Gold	Volleyball team
Hun Sen Volleyball Championship 2023	Cambodia	Silver	Volleyball team

Volleyball
International
Year	Place	Medal	Event
2021	Vietnam	Bronze	Team
2023	Cambodia	Silver	Team
