= Phol Ratanak =

Cambodian volleyball player (born 1999)

Phol Ratanak ផុល រតនៈ
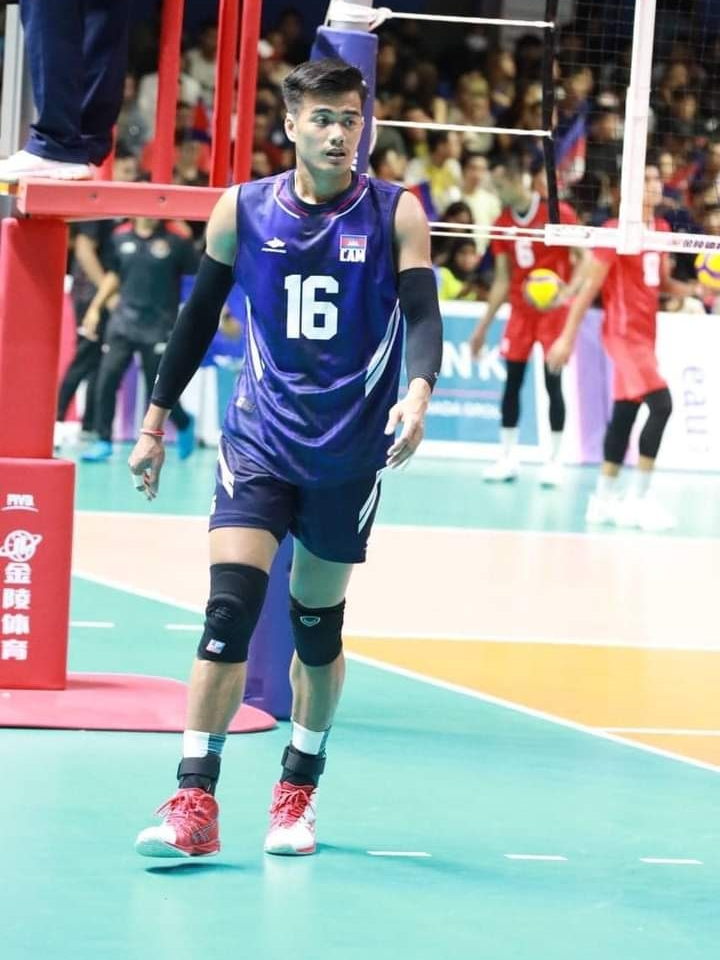
- Ratanak vs Indonesia during the 2023 SEA Games

Personal information
- Full name: Phol Ratanak
- Nationality: Cambodian
- Born: 12 March 1999 (age 27); Prey Veng, Cambodia
- Hometown: Phnom Penh, Cambodia
- Height: 1.87 m (6 ft 2 in)
- Weight: 80 kg (176 lb)
- Spike: 330 cm (130 in)
- Block: 320 cm (126 in)

Volleyball information
- Position: Middle–blocker
- Current club: Visakha Volleyball Club
- Number: 16 (national team); 16 (club)

Career
Years	Teams
?–present	(Cambodia) Visakha Volleyball Club

National team
2019–present	Cambodia
Medal record
Men's volleyball
Representing Cambodia
Southeast Asian Games
Silver medal – second place	2023 Cambodia	Team
Bronze medal – third place	2021 Vietnam	Team
SEA V Cup
Gold medal – first place	2026 Candon	Team

Phol Ratanak (Khmer: ផុល រតនៈ [pʰol rŏə.taʔ.naʔ]; born 12 March 1999) is a Cambodian volleyball player for Visakha Volleyball Club.

== Career ==
He started to play volleyball at the age of 17 before joining Visakha Volleyball Club. During his time at Visakha, he won a gold medal at Hun Sen Volleyball Championship in 2022 and finished the same event as runner-up in 2023.

Internationally, he appeared in 3 SEA Games editions, in 2019, 2021, and 2023, which he won a bronze medal in 2021 edition and a silver medal at his home soil in 2023 edition. He is well known for blocking Thai's outside hitter, Napadet Bhinijdee during the semi-finals of the men's volleyball event in the 2023 SEA Games which help his country reach the final for the first time in history after an insane 3–2 comeback against Thailand.

== Personal life ==
He is engaged in February 2023 and has a young brother, Phol Vathana.

== Honours ==
Volleyball
Domestic
Competitions	Place	Medal	Event
Hun Sen Volleyball Championship 2022	Cambodia	Gold	Volleyball team
Hun Sen Volleyball Championship 2023	Cambodia	Silver	Volleyball team

Volleyball
International
Year	Place	Medal	Event
2021	Vietnam	Bronze	Team
2023	Cambodia	Silver	Team
