= Volleyball at the 2021 SEA Games – Men's tournament =

Men's volleyball tournament at the 2021 SEA Games
- Venue: Đại Yên Arena, Quảng Ninh
- Dates: 13–22 May 2022
- Nations: 7

Medalists
gold medal	Indonesia
silver medal	Vietnam
bronze medal	Cambodia

The men's volleyball tournament at the 2021 SEA Games was held at the Đại Yên Arena in Quảng Ninh from 13 May to 22 May 2022.

== Draw ==
The draw for the men's volleyball tournament was held on 8 April 2022 in Hanoi. Vietnam as host chose the group which it wanted to be allocated in.

== Venue ==
All matches
Quang Ninh, Vietnam
Dai Yen Arena
Capacity: 5,000

== Participating nations ==
- Cambodia
- Indonesia
- Malaysia
- Myanmar
- Philippines
- Thailand
- Vietnam

=== Squads ===
Cambodia	Indonesia	Malaysia	Myanmar
Sovandara Khim; Phearoth Chheang; Sarun Pin; Soeurn Heng; Sokheang An; Mom Kuon; Ratanak Phol; Channaro Soun; Reaseykeo Lang; Nimul Mourn; Voeurn Veasna; Phaniet Phol; Sokheang Mon; Piseth Kong	Rendy Tamamilang; Sigit Ardian; Muhammad Malizi; Daffa Naufal; Yuda Mardiansyah Putra; Dimas Saputra; Rivan Nurmulki; Irpan; Farhan Halim; Dio Zulfikri; Nizar Julfikar Munawar; Fahreza Rakha; Doni Haryono; Hernanda Zulfi	Ranjit Ramu; Kish Kong; Siaw Kit Chiong; Robert Elvin Ak; Soo Yuee Lim; Vincent Lau; Heng Wei Moh; Huan Xiong Wong; Mohd Aizzat; Danesh Mathivanan; Sieng Han Lin; Wai Kit Kong; Lester Siah; Jie En Yee	San Nyunt Maung; Myo Htet Oo; Myo Min Oo; Ya Htike Wai; Zaw Lwin Tun; Aung Thu; Zaw Htet Aung; Khine Htet Tun; Thaw Tar Lin; Nay Htet Ko; Htet Lin Aung; Khwe Char Maung
Philippines	Thailand	Vietnam	
Bryan Bagunas; John Paul Bugaoan; Ave Joshua Retamar; Manuel Sumanguid III; Kim Niño Malabunga; Rex Emmanuel Intal; Angelo Nicolas Almendras; John Vic De Guzman; Joshua Umandal; Francis Saura; Jack Kalingking; Marck Jesus Espejo; Jessie Lopez; Ysrael Wilson Marasigan	Chatmongkhon Paketkaeo; Jakkapong Tongklang; Anut Promchan; Amorntep Konhan; Pusit Phonarin; Napadet Bhinijdee; Assanaphan Chantajorn; Siwadon Sanhatham; Anuchit Pakdeekaew; Mawin Maneewong; Adipong Phonpinyo; Kittithad Nuwaddee; Chayut Khongrueng; Kissada Nilsawai	Huỳnh Trung Trực; Trịnh Duy Phúc; Giang Văn Đức; Quản Trọng Nghĩa; Nguyễn Văn Quốc Duy; Từ Thanh Thuận; Nguyễn Xuân Thanh; Phạm Thái Hưng; Lâm Văn Sanh; Nguyễn Đình Nhu; Nguyễn Văn Nam; Vũ Ngọc Hoàng; Dương Văn Tiên; Cù Văn Hoàn	

== Results ==
=== Preliminary round ===
- All times are Vietnam Standard Time (UTC+07:00)

==== Group A ====
Pos	Team	Pld	W	L	Pts	SW	SL	SR	SPW	SPL	SPR	Qualification
1	Indonesia	3	3	0	9	9	1	9.000	246	169	1.456	Semifinals
2	Vietnam	3	2	1	6	7	3	2.333	225	212	1.061	Semifinals
3	Myanmar	3	1	2	3	3	6	0.500	198	204	0.971	5th place match
4	Malaysia	3	0	3	0	0	9	0.000	141	225	0.627	5th–7th place play-off

Date	Time		Score		Set 1	Set 2	Set 3	Set 4	Set 5	Total	Report
13 May	14:00	Indonesia	3–0	Myanmar	25–22	25–17	25–19			75–58	Report
14 May	17:00	Vietnam	3–0	Malaysia	25–16	25–14	25–21			75–51	Report
15 May	14:00	Myanmar	3–0	Malaysia	25–13	25–19	25–22			75–54	Report
15 May	17:00	Indonesia	3–1	Vietnam	21–25	25–15	25–21	25–14		96–75	Report
17 May	14:00	Malaysia	0–3	Indonesia	12–25	11–25	13–25			36–75	Report
18 May	17:00	Vietnam	3–0	Myanmar	25–22	25–22	25–21			75–65	Report

==== Group B ====
Pos	Team	Pld	W	L	Pts	SW	SL	SR	SPW	SPL	SPR	Qualification
1	Thailand	2	2	0	5	6	2	3.000	186	172	1.081	Semifinals
2	Cambodia	2	1	1	4	5	4	1.250	211	209	1.010	Semifinals
3	Philippines	2	0	2	0	1	6	0.167	171	187	0.914	5th–7th place play-off

Date	Time		Score		Set 1	Set 2	Set 3	Set 4	Set 5	Total	Report
14 May	11:00	Philippines	1–3	Cambodia	21–25	26–24	28–30	27–29		102–108	Report
16 May	14:00	Thailand	3–0	Philippines	25–20	29–27	25–22			79–69	Report
18 May	11:00	Cambodia	2–3	Thailand	25–22	25–20	22–25	20–25	11–15	103–107	Report

=== Final round ===
- All times are Vietnam Standard Time (UTC+07:00)

Semi-finals; 20 May
A1	Indonesia	3
B2	Cambodia	1
B1	Thailand	2
A2	Vietnam	3

Gold medal match 22 May
A1	Indonesia	3
A2	Vietnam	0
Bronze medal match 21 May
B2	Cambodia	3
B1	Thailand	2

5th–7th place play-off 19 May			Fifth place match 20 May
			A3	Myanmar	2
A4	Malaysia	0	B3	Philippines	3
B3	Philippines	3

==== 5th–7th place play-off ====
Date	Time		Score		Set 1	Set 2	Set 3	Set 4	Set 5	Total	Report
19 May	14:00	Malaysia	0–3	Philippines	12–25	13–25	12–25			37–75	Report

==== Semifinals ====
Date	Time		Score		Set 1	Set 2	Set 3	Set 4	Set 5	Total	Report
20 May	14:00	Indonesia	3–1	Cambodia	25–18	25–15	22–25	25–16		97–74	Report
20 May	17:00	Thailand	2–3	Vietnam	25–17	23–25	17–25	25–23	13–15	103–105	Report

==== 5th place match ====
Date	Time		Score		Set 1	Set 2	Set 3	Set 4	Set 5	Total	Report
20 May	11:00	Myanmar	2–3	Philippines	24–26	25–22	22–25	29–27	14–16	114–116	Report

==== Bronze medal match ====
Date	Time		Score		Set 1	Set 2	Set 3	Set 4	Set 5	Total	Report
21 May	14:00	Cambodia	3–2	Thailand	25–23	22–25	25–22	13–25	15–13	100–108	Report

==== Gold medal match ====
Date	Time		Score		Set 1	Set 2	Set 3	Set 4	Set 5	Total	Report
22 May	14:00	Indonesia	3–0	Vietnam	25–22	25–18	25–15			75–55	Report

== Final standings ==
Rank	Team
1st place, gold medalist(s)	Indonesia
2nd place, silver medalist(s)	Vietnam
3rd place, bronze medalist(s)	Cambodia
4	Thailand
5	Philippines
6	Myanmar
7	Malaysia

== See also ==
- Women's tournament
