= Malaysia men's national volleyball team =

National sports team

Malaysia
- Association: Malaysia Volleyball Federation
- Confederation: AVC
- FIVB ranking: NR (3 August 2026)

Uniforms
| Home | Away |
Honours
Southeast Asian Games
| Silver medal – second place | 2001 Malaysia | Team |
SEA V.League Challenge
| Silver medal – second place | 2024 Phnom Penh | Team |

The Malaysia men's national volleyball team represents Malaysia in international men's volleyball competitions and friendly matches.

They had their best year when they qualified for the 2018 AVC Men's Challenge Cup.

== Competitive record ==
=== Asian Games ===
| Year | Result | Pld | W | L | SW | SL | PW | PL |
|---|---|---|---|---|---|---|---|---|
| (Japan) 1958 | Did not participate | 0 | 0 | 0 | 0 | 0 | 0 | 0 |
| (Indonesia) 1962 | Did not participate | 0 | 0 | 0 | 0 | 0 | 0 | 0 |
| (Thailand) 1966 | 12th place | 8 | 0 | 8 | 0 | 15 | 0 | 0 |
| (Thailand) 1970 | Did not participate | 0 | 0 | 0 | 0 | 0 | 0 | 0 |
| (Iran) 1974 | Did not participate | 0 | 0 | 0 | 0 | 0 | 0 | 0 |
| (Thailand) 1978 | Did not participate | 0 | 0 | 0 | 0 | 0 | 0 | 0 |
| (India) 1982 | Did not participate | 0 | 0 | 0 | 0 | 0 | 0 | 0 |
| (South Korea) 1986 | Did not participate | 0 | 0 | 0 | 0 | 0 | 0 | 0 |
| (China) 1990 | Did not participate | 0 | 0 | 0 | 0 | 0 | 0 | 0 |
| (Japan) 1994 | Did not participate | 0 | 0 | 0 | 0 | 0 | 0 | 0 |
| (Thailand) 1998 | Did not participate | 0 | 0 | 0 | 0 | 0 | 0 | 0 |
| (South Korea) 2002 | Did not participate | 0 | 0 | 0 | 0 | 0 | 0 | 0 |
| (Qatar) 2006 | Did not participate | 0 | 0 | 0 | 0 | 0 | 0 | 0 |
| (China) 2010 | Did not participate | 0 | 0 | 0 | 0 | 0 | 0 | 0 |
| (South Korea) 2014 | Did not participate | 0 | 0 | 0 | 0 | 0 | 0 | 0 |
| (Indonesia) 2018 | Did not participate | 0 | 0 | 0 | 0 | 0 | 0 | 0 |
| Total | 1/16 | 8 | 0 | 8 | 0 | 15 | 0 | 0 |

=== Asian Challenge Cup ===
| Year | Result | Pld | W | L | SW | SL |
|---|---|---|---|---|---|---|
| (Sri Lanka) 2018 | 7th | 3 | 1 | 2 | 4 | 6 |
| (Kyrgyzstan) 2022 | Did not participate | | | | | |
| (Taiwan) 2023 | Did not participate | | | | | |
| (Bahrain) 2024 | Did not participate | | | | | |
| Total | 1/4 | 3 | 1 | 2 | 4 | 6 |

=== SEA Games ===
Champions Runners up Third place Fourth place

SEA Games record
| Year | Round | Position | Pld | W | L | SW | SL | Squad |
|---|---|---|---|---|---|---|---|---|
| (Malaysia) 1977 | | ? | | | | | | Squad |
| (Indonesia) 1979 | | ? | | | | | | Squad |
| (Philippines) 1981 | | ? | | | | | | Squad |
| (Singapore) 1983 | | 6th Place | 3 | 1 | 2 | 5 | 6 | Squad |
| (Thailand) 1985 | | ? | | | | | | Squad |
| (Indonesia) 1987 | | ? | | | | | | Squad |
| (Malaysia) 1989 | | ? | | | | | | Squad |
| (Philippines) 1991 | | ? | | | | | | Squad |
| (Singapore) 1993 | | ? | | | | | | Squad |
| (Thailand) 1995 | | ? | | | | | | Squad |
| (Indonesia) 1997 | | ? | | | | | | Squad |
| (Brunei) 1999 | Not held | | | | | | | |
| (Malaysia) 2001 | Final | Silver Medal | | | | | | Squad |
| (Vietnam) 2003 | Classification Round | 6th place | 3 | 1 | 2 | 3 | 7 | Squad |
| (Laos) 2009 | Classification Round | 6th place | 2 | 0 | 2 | 1 | 6 | Squad |
| (Indonesia) 2011 | Round robin | 5th place | 5 | 1 | 4 | 5 | 13 | Squad |
| (Myanmar) 2013 | Preliminary round | 6th place | 3 | 1 | 2 | 3 | 7 | Squad |
| (Singapore) 2015 | Group Stage | 7th place | 3 | 0 | 3 | 2 | 9 | Squad |
| (Malaysia) 2017 | Preliminary round | 5th place | 3 | 1 | 2 | 5 | 6 | Squad |
| (Vietnam) 2021 | Classification Round | 7th place | 3 | 0 | 3 | 0 | 9 | Squad |
| (Cambodia) 2023 | Classification Round | 8th place | 3 | 1 | 2 | 3 | 7 | Squad |
| (Thailand) 2025 | Did not participate | | | | | | | |
| Total | 0 Titles | | 28 | 6 | 22 | 27 | 70 | — |

== See also ==
- Malaysia women's national volleyball team
