= Cambodia men's national volleyball team =

Cambodia
- Association: Volleyball Federation of Cambodia
- Confederation: AVC
- Head coach: (Cambodia) Sameth Nouv
- FIVB ranking: 123 ▲13 (1 October 2026)

Uniforms
Home	Away
Honours
Southeast Asian Games
Bronze medal – third place	1961 Rangoon	Team
Gold medal – first place	1965 Kuala Lumpur	Team
Gold medal – first place	1971 Kuala Lumpur	Team
Gold medal – first place	1973 Singapore	Team
Bronze medal – third place	2021 Quảng Ninh	Team
Silver medal – second place	2023 Phnom Penh	Team
SEA V Cup
Gold medal – first place	2026 Candon	Team

The Cambodia men's national volleyball team represents Cambodia in international men's volleyball competitions and friendly matches.

They won the bronze medal at the 2021 SEA Games event in Vietnam.

== Competition record ==
=== Asian Games ===
Champions Runners-up Third place Fourth place

Asian Games record
Year	Round	Position	Pld	W	L	SW	SL	Squad
(Indonesia) 1962	Round robin	7th place	-	-	-	-	-	-
(Thailand) 1970	Round robin	4th place	-	-	-	-	-	-
(China) 2022	Preliminary round	19th place	2	0	2	0	6	Squad
Total	0 Titles	4th place						—

=== GANEFO ===
Champions Runners-up Third place Fourth place

GANEFO record
Year	Round	Position	Pld	W	L	SW	SL	Squad
(Cambodia) 1966	Round robin	4th place	7	4	3	-	-	-

=== SEA Games ===
Champions Runners-up Third place Fourth place

SEA Games record
Year	Round	Position	Pld	W	L	SW	SL	Squad
(Malaysia) 1971	Final	Champions	4	4	0	12	0	—
(Singapore) 1973	Final	Champions	4	4	0	12	0	—
(Singapore) 1983	Preliminary round	8th place	4	0	4	–	–	Squad
(Indonesia) 2011	Round robin	6th place	5	0	5	1	12	Squad
(Myanmar) 2013	Preliminary round	7th place	3	0	3	1	9	Squad
(Singapore) 2015	Preliminary round	6th place	3	0	3	3	7	Squad
(Malaysia) 2017	Preliminary round	7th place	3	0	3	0	9	Squad
(Philippines) 2019	Preliminary round	6th place	4	1	3	3	11	Squad
(Vietnam) 2021	Semifinals	3rd place	4	2	2	9	9	Squad
(Cambodia) 2023	Final	Runners-up	5	3	2	9	8	Squad
(Thailand) 2025	Qualified but withdrew							
Total	1 Titles	9/24						—

=== SEA V Cup ===
Champions Runners-up Third place Fourth place

SEA V Cup record
Year	Round	Position	GP	MW	ML	SW	SL
(Indonesia) (Philippines) 2023	Did not enter						
(Philippines) (Indonesia) 2024	Did not enter (Note: Participated in the SEA V.League Challenge)						
(Philippines) (Indonesia) 2025	Round robin	5th place	4	0	4	2	12
(Philippines) (Indonesia) 2025	Round robin	5th place	4	0	4	2	12
(Philippines) (Indonesia) 2026	Final	Champions	4	3	1	9	6
(Philippines) (Indonesia) 2026	Semifinals	4th place	4	1	3	4	9
Total	1 Title	4/8	16	4	12	17	39

== Results and fixtures ==
=== 2026 ===
==== 2026 SEA V Cup ====
15 July 2026; 17:30 (UTC+08:00)	Philippines	2–3	Cambodia	Candon City Arena, Candon, Philippines
15 July 2026; 17:30 (UTC+08:00)	(23–25, 30–28, 20–25, 25–22, 8–15)			Candon City Arena, Candon, Philippines

16 July 2026; 17:30 (UTC+08:00)	Indonesia	3–0	Cambodia	Candon City Arena, Candon, Philippines
16 July 2026; 17:30 (UTC+08:00)	(25–18, 25–18, 25–21)			Candon City Arena, Candon, Philippines

18 July 2026; 16:00 (UTC+08:00)	Thailand	1–3	Cambodia	Candon City Arena, Candon, Philippines
18 July 2026; 16:00 (UTC+08:00)	(21–25, 25–16, 23–25, 17–25)			Candon City Arena, Candon, Philippines

19 July 2026; 17:30 (UTC+08:00)	Indonesia	2–3	Cambodia	Candon City Arena, Candon, Philippines
19 July 2026; 17:30 (UTC+08:00)	(23–25, 26–28, 25–23, 25–22, 11–15)			Candon City Arena, Candon, Philippines

22 July 2026; 19:00 (UTC+07:00)	Indonesia	3–0	Cambodia	Jakarta International Velodrome, Jakarta, Indonesia
22 July 2026; 19:00 (UTC+07:00)	(26–24, 25–15, 25–17)			Jakarta International Velodrome, Jakarta, Indonesia

23 July 2026; 19:00 (UTC+07:00)	Philippines	0–3	Cambodia	Jakarta International Velodrome, Jakarta, Indonesia
23 July 2026; 19:00 (UTC+07:00)	(20–25, 21–25, 24–26)			Jakarta International Velodrome, Jakarta, Indonesia

25 July 2026; 15:30 (UTC+07:00)	Thailand	3–0	Cambodia	Jakarta International Velodrome, Jakarta, Indonesia
25 July 2026; 15:30 (UTC+07:00)	(25–18, 25–19, 25–18)			Jakarta International Velodrome, Jakarta, Indonesia

26 July 2026; 15:30 (UTC+07:00)	Indonesia	3–1	Cambodia	Jakarta International Velodrome, Jakarta, Indonesia
26 July 2026; 15:30 (UTC+07:00)	(25–18, 19–25, 25–20, 26–24)			Jakarta International Velodrome, Jakarta, Indonesia

==== Friendly ====
19 August 2026; 19:00 (UTC+07:00)	Cambodia	0-3	Indonesia	Olympic Stadium, Phnom Penh, Cambodia
19 August 2026; 19:00 (UTC+07:00)	(18–25, 26–28, 19–25)			Olympic Stadium, Phnom Penh, Cambodia

25 August 2026; 18:00 (UTC+07:00)	Cambodia	0-3	Indonesia	Olympic Stadium, Jakarta, Indonesia
25 August 2026; 18:00 (UTC+07:00)	(18–25, 19–25, 22–25)			Olympic Stadium, Jakarta, Indonesia

== Team ==
=== Current roster ===
The following is the roster for SAMDECH THIPADEI International Volleyball CUP 2026/27.

- Team Manager: (Cambodia) Aing SereyPiseth
- Head coach: (Cambodia) Sameth Nouv
- Statistics : (Cambodia) Peng Sovanno
- Assistant coach: (Cuba) Berto Friol Barrios
- Physiotherapist : (Cambodia) Hong Vanchhai

Cambodian Men's National Volleyball Team for SAMDECH THIPADEI International Volleyball CUP 2026/27
No.	Position	Name	Date of birth	Height	Weight	Spike	Block	2026 Club
29	L	Un Sovannreach	19 September 2008	1.77 m (5 ft 10 in)	70 kg (150 lb)	325 cm (128 in)	323 cm (127 in)	Visakha Cambodia Volleyball Club
23	L	Seng Kimhab	7 June 1994	1.78 m (5 ft 10 in)	75 kg (165 lb)	317 cm (125 in)	335 cm (132 in)	Visakha Cambodia Volleyball Club
18	S	Keo Srenglyhour	23 April 2005	1.92 m (6 ft 4 in)	70 kg (150 lb)	335 cm (132 in)	300 cm (120 in)	(Cambodia) Ministry Of Interior
7	OP	Pin Sarun	4 April 1994	2.01 m (6 ft 7 in)	75 kg (165 lb)	340 cm (130 in)	337 cm (133 in)	Visakha Cambodia Volleyball Club
33	MB	Ouk Ratha	24 February 2003	1.87 m (6 ft 2 in)	78 kg (172 lb)	335 cm (132 in)	330 cm (130 in)	(Cambodia) Commissariat Of Phnom Penh Municipal Police
9	OH	Voeurn Veasna	5 May 2001	1.95 m (6 ft 5 in)	85 kg (187 lb)	359 cm (141 in)	338 cm (133 in)	(Taiwan) Taichung Win Streak
3	OH	Lim Chettra	2 July 2006	1.85 m (6 ft 1 in)	76 kg (168 lb)	337 cm (133 in)	335 cm (132 in)	Visakha Cambodia Volleyball
15	OH	Kuon Mom	10 June 1998	1.98 m (6 ft 6 in)	92 kg (203 lb)	338 cm (133 in)	335 cm (132 in)	(Vietnam) Hà Nội Volleyball Club
16	MB	Phol Ratanak	2 March 1999	1.88 m (6 ft 2 in)	80 kg (180 lb)	335 cm (132 in)	334 cm (131 in)	Visakha Cambodia Volleyball Club
17	S	Soun Channaro (c)	27 July 1995	1.90 m (6 ft 3 in)	90 kg (200 lb)	315 cm (124 in)	309 cm (122 in)	(Vietnam) Dong Nai City Volleyball Club
5	MB	Sereysambath Som	6 July 2006	1.90 m (6 ft 3 in)	70 kg (150 lb)	325 cm (128 in)	333 cm (131 in)	Visakha Cambodia Volleyball Club
25	MB	Kheng Thona	9 June 2005	1.92 m (6 ft 4 in)	90 kg (200 lb)	340 cm (130 in)	333 cm (131 in)	Visakha Cambodia Volleyball Club
20	OH	Chan Veasna	20 June 2003	1.90 m (6 ft 3 in)	70 kg (150 lb)	342 cm (135 in)	335 cm (132 in)	(Vietnam) Ho Chi Minh City Volleyball Club
1	OP	Sor Pisey	25 April 2008	1.88 m (6 ft 2 in)	78 kg (172 lb)	360 cm (140 in)	345 cm (136 in)	Visakha Cambodia Volleyball Club

=== SEA Games ===
- (Vietnam) 2021 — (bronze) Bronze Medal

Khim Sovandara, Chheang Phearoth, Pin Sarun, Soeurn Heng, An Sokheang, Kong Piseth, Kuon Mom, Phol Ratanak, Soun Channaro (c), Lang Reaseykeo, Mourn Nimul, Voeurn Veasna, Phol Phaniet, Mon Sokheang. Head coach: Li Jun.

- (Cambodia) 2023 — (silver) Silver Medal

Khim Sovandara, Chheang Phearoth, Born Narith, Pin Sarun, Din Siden, Voeurn Veasna, Soeurn Heng, Mouen Menglaiy, Kuon Mom, Phol Ratanak, Soun Channaro (c), Lang Reaseykeo, Mourn Nimul, Phol Phaniet, An Sokheang. Head coach: Li Jun.
