= Singapore men's national volleyball team =

National sports team

Singapore
- Association: Volleyball Association of Singapore
- Confederation: AVC
- Head coach: Akihiko Narita
- FIVB ranking: NR (1 October 2026)

Uniforms
Home	Away

Asian Championship
- Appearances: 1 (First in 1979)
- Best result: 12 (1979)

Singapore men's national volleyball team
Medal record

Southeast Asian Games
Bronze medal – third place	1985 Bangkok	Team
Bronze medal – third place	1993 Singapore	Team

The Singapore men's national volleyball team is the men's national volleyball team of Singapore. The Singapore men's national volleyball team represents Singapore in international men's volleyball competitions and friendly matches.

They qualified for the 1979 Asian Men's Volleyball Championship.

== Current roster ==
- Head Coach: Akihiko Narita

The following is the Singapore roster in the 2019 SEA Games.

No.	Name	Date of birth	Height	Spike	Block
7	Teo Zi Hao (c)	-	-	-	-
1	Ang Jin Yuan	-	-	-	-
4	Lee Kang Yue	-	-	-	-
18	Wong Chang Wei	-	-	-	-
19	Wilson Ng Rui	-	-	-	-
9	Ajay Singh Shergill	-	-	-	-
5	Chua Hong Yao	-	-	-	-
3	Chew Ming Feng	-	-	-	-
17	Jordan Wong	-	-	-	-
6	Fu Hao Rong	10/10/1990	1.65m	-	-
10	Tian Seet Khuen	-	-	-	-
8	Lee Teck Kai	-	-	-	-
13	Cheah Wei Jie				
2	Ryan Tan Sing				

== Competition history ==
=== Southeast Asian Games ===
- (Philippines) 1981 — Group Stage
- (Singapore) 1983 — Group Stage
- (Thailand) 1985 — Bronze medal
- (Singapore) 1993 — Bronze medal
- (Singapore) 2015 — 8th place
- (Philippines) 2019 — 7th place
- (Cambodia) 2023 — 6th place
- (Thailand) 2025 — 6th place

=== SEA V League Challenge ===
- (Cambodia) 2024 — 4th place
