= Myanmar men's national volleyball team =

National volleyball team

Myanmar
- Association: Myanmar Volleyball Federation
- Confederation: AVC
- Head coach: Jose Augusto
- FIVB ranking: NR (5 October 2025)

Uniforms
Home	Away
Honours
Southeast Asian Games
Gold medal – first place	1977 Kuala Lumpur	Team
Gold medal – first place	1979 Jakarta	Team
Gold medal – first place	1983 Singapore	Team
Silver medal – second place	1981 Manila	Team
Silver medal – second place	1987 Jakarta	Team
Silver medal – second place	1989 Kuala Lumpur	Team
Silver medal – second place	1995 Chiang Mai	Team
Bronze medal – third place	2001 Kuala Lumpur	Team
Bronze medal – third place	2003 Ninh Bình	Team
Bronze medal – third place	2009 Vientiane	Team
Bronze medal – third place	2015 Singapore	Team

The Myanmar men's national volleyball team is the volleyball national team of Myanmar, represents Myanmar in international volleyball competitions and friendly matches. Men team grabbed gold in 1961, 1965, 1969, 1975, 1977, 1979 and 1983 SEA Games. The highest achievement at Asian Games is 4th place at 1978 Asian games. Myanmar youth men team captured Southeast Asian junior men volleyball championship with a record of 9 times.

== Competition record ==
=== Asian Championship ===
Champions Runners up Third place Fourth place

Asian Championship record
Year	Round	Position	Pld	W	L	SW	SL
(Australia) 1975	Did not participate						
(Hong Kong) 1979	Did not participate						
(Japan) 1983	Did not participate						
(Kuwait) 1987	Did not participate						
(South Korea) 1989	Did not participate						
(Australia) 1991	Did not participate						
(Thailand) 1993	Did not participate						
(South Korea) 1995	Did not participate						
(Qatar) 1997	Did not participate						
(Iran) 1999	Did not participate						
(South Korea) 2001	Did not participate						
(China) 2003	Did not participate						
(Thailand) 2005	Did not participate						
(Indonesia) 2007	Did not participate						
(Philippines) 2009		10th place	7	4	3	15	15
(Iran) 2011	Did not participate						
(United Arab Emirates) 2013		18th place	4	1	3	4	9
(Iran) 2015	Did not participate						
(Indonesia) 2017	Did not participate						
Total	2 Titles	2/18	0	0	0	0	0

=== Asian Games ===
Champions Runners up Third place Fourth place

Asian Games record
Year	Round	Position	Pld	W	L	SW	SL
(Japan) 1958	Did not participate						
(Indonesia) 1962		6th place	7	1	6	3	19
(Thailand) 1966	Did not participate						
(Thailand) 1970	Did not participate						
(Iran) 1974	Did not participate						
(Thailand) 1978	Semi Finals	4th place	8	5	3	15	10
(India) 1982	Did not participate						
(South Korea) 1986	Did not participate						
(China) 1990		9th place	4	0	4	0	12
(Japan) 1994	Did not participate						
(Thailand) 1998	Did not participate						
(South Korea) 2002	Did not participate						
(Qatar) 2006	Did not participate						
(China) 2010		14th place	8	3	5	12	18
(South Korea) 2014		14th place	7	2	5	9	22
(Indonesia) 2018		11th place	5	2	3	9	12
Total	0 Titles	6/16	39	13	26	48	93

=== Asian Cup ===
Champions Runners up Third place Fourth place

Asian Cup record
Year	Round	Position	Pld	W	L	SW	SL
(Thailand) 2008	Did not qualify						
(Iran) 2010	Did not qualify						
(Vietnam) 2012		8th place	6	0	6	1	18
(Kazakhstan) 2014	Did not qualify						
(Thailand) 2016	Did not qualify						
(Taiwan) 2018	Did not qualify						
Total	0 Titles	1/6	6	0	6	1	18

=== Southeast Asian Games ===
Champions Runners up Third place Fourth place

SEA Games record
Year	Round	Position	Pld	W	L	SW	SL
(Malaysia) 1977	Final	Gold Medal					
(Indonesia) 1979	Final	Gold Medal					
(Philippines) 1981	Final	Silver Medal					
(Singapore) 1983	Final	Gold Medal					
(Thailand) 1985		?					
(Indonesia) 1987	Final	Silver Medal					
(Malaysia) 1989	Final	Silver Medal					
(Philippines) 1991		?					
(Singapore) 1993		?					
(Thailand) 1995	Final	Silver Medal					
(Indonesia) 1997		?					
(Brunei) 1999	Not held						
(Malaysia) 2001	Semi Finals	Bronze Medal					
(Vietnam) 2003	Semi Finals	Bronze Medal					
(Philippines) 2005		4th place					
(Thailand) 2007	Semi Finals	4th place					
(Laos) 2009	Semi Finals	Bronze Medal					
(Indonesia) 2011	Semi Finals	4th place					
(Myanmar) 2013	Semi Finals	4th place					
(Singapore) 2015	Semi Finals	Bronze Medal					
(Malaysia) 2017	Semi Finals	4th place	5	2	3	8	11
(Philippines) 2019	Semi Finals	4th place	4	1	3	3	9
(Vietnam) 2021		6th place	4	1	3	5	9
(Cambodia) 2023		7th place	5	1	4	4	14
(Thailand) 2025		5th place	4	2	2	6	8
Total	3 Titles						

=== SEA V Cup ===
Champions Runners up Third place Fourth place

SEA V Cup record
Year	Round	Position	Pld	W	L	SW	SL
(Indonesia) (Philippines) 2023	Did not enter						
(Philippines) (Indonesia) 2024	Did not enter						
(Philippines) (Indonesia) 2025	Did not enter						
(Philippines) (Indonesia) 2026	5th place match	6th place	3	0	3	0	9
(Philippines) (Indonesia) 2026	5th place match	6th place	3	0	3	0	9
Total	0 Titles	2/8	6	0	6	0	18

== Team ==
=== Current squad ===
Squad at the 2013 Southeast Asian Games

- Coach: Augusto J.S.

No.	Player	Birth Date	Weight	Height	Club	Position
2	Kyaw Kyaw Htway (c)	18.01.1988	84	187		Setter
3	Pai Thu	14.11.1990	73	190	(Myanmar) TBD ↓
5	Win Tun Oo	11.01.1990	74	190
6	Sie Nyi Lay	15.01.1986	72	186
7	Kyaw Swar Lwin	14.04.1977	73	178
10	Tin Maung Htway	27.05.1986	75	187
11	Aung Thu	10.07.1993	74	190	(Thailand) Nakhon Ratchasima	Wing Spiker
13	Zaw Myo	03.05.1995	73	188	(Myanmar) TBD ↓
14	Ye Yint Tun	21.06.1998	73	188
15	Aung Myat Tun	23.11.1990	68	175
17	Thwin Htoo Zin	23.07.1996	73	188
