= 2023 AVC Men's Challenge Cup squads =

Volleyball

This article shows the roster of all participating teams at the 2023 AVC Men's Challenge Cup.

== Australia ==
The following is Australia's roster in the 2023 AVC Men's Challenge Cup.

Head coach: (Canada) Dave Preston

- 2 Arshdeep Dosanjh S
- 4 Jackson Holland L
- 7 James Weir MB
- 8 Trent O'Dea MB
- 11 Luke Perry L
- 12 Nehemiah Mote MB
- 14 Hamish Hazelden OP
- 19 William D'Arcy OP
- 21 Nicholas Butler S
- 29 Ethan Garrett OH
- 31 Matthew Aubrey OP
- 33 Sam Flowerday OH
- 35 Matthew Kemp OH
- 37 Jacob Baird MB

== Bahrain ==
The following is Bahrain's roster in the 2023 AVC Men's Challenge Cup.

Head coach: Ruben Adrian Wolochin

- 1 Ebrahim AbdulRasool OP
- 3 Mohamed Aldawiri MB
- 4 Abbas Alkhabbaz MB
- 7 Mahmood Alafyah S
- 8 Mahmood Ahmed OH
- 9 Mohamed Abdulla MB
- 11 Ali Ebrahim S
- 13 Ali Khamis OP
- 14 Mahmood Salman OH
- 15 Naser Anan OH
- 17 Mohamed Abdulla OH
- 18 Ayman Haroon L
- 20 Abbas Sultan L
- 21 Hani Allawi MB

== Chinese Taipei ==
The following is Chinese Taipei's roster in the 2023 AVC Men's Challenge Cup.

Head coach: (Serbia) Moro Branislav

- 2 Jhang Yun-liang L
- 3 Li Chia-hsuan L
- 4 Tseng Hsiang-ming OH
- 5 Lin Chien S
- 6 Tai Ju-chien S
- 8 Lei No OH
- 9 Kao Wei-cheng OH
- 11 Wu Tsung-hsuan OH
- 14 Chang Yu-sheng OP
- 15 Chan Min-han OH
- 16 Yen Chen-fu MB
- 17 Lin Yi-huei MB
- 19 Chen Chien-chen OH
- 20 Tsai Pei-chang MB

== Hong Kong ==
The following is Hong Kong's roster in the 2023 AVC Men's Challenge Cup.

Head coach: (Serbia) Dragan Mihailovic

== Indonesia ==
The following is Indonesia's roster in the 2023 AVC Men's Challenge Cup.

Head coach: (China) Jiang Jie

- 1 Cep Indra Agustin MB
- 3 Boy Arnez Arabi OH
- 4 Hendra Kurniawan MB
- 6 Muhamad Malizi MB
- 10 Fahri Septian OH
- 12 Rivan Nurmulki OP
- 13 Hernanda Zulfi MB
- 14 Farhan Halim OH
- 15 Dio Zulfikri S
- 17 Agil Angga Anggara OP
- 19 Fahreza Rakha Abhinaya L
- 20 Irpan L
- 21 Doni Haryono OH
- 23 Nizar Julfikar S

== India ==
The following is India's roster in the 2023 AVC Men's Challenge Cup.

Head coach: (India) Thattil Chandran Jothish

== Kazakshtan ==
The following is Kazakshtan's roster in the 2023 AVC Men's Challenge Cup.

Head coach: (Kazakhstan) Boris Grebennikov

== Macau ==
The following is Macau's roster in the 2023 AVC Men's Challenge Cup.

Head coach: (Macau) Sergio Zeferino De Souza

== Mongolia ==
The following is Mongolia's roster in the 2023 AVC Men's Challenge Cup.

Head coach: (Mongolia) Darinchuluun Batbold

== Philippines ==
The following is Philippines' roster in the 2023 AVC Men's Challenge Cup.

Head coach: (Brazil) Sergio Veloso

- 1 Vince Mangulabnan S
- 2 Noel Kampton OH
- 3 Kim Harold Dayandante S
- 4 Vince Patrick Lorenzo L
- 5 Ryan Ka OH
- 6 Kim Malabunga MB
- 8 Steve Rotter OP
- 11 Joshua Umandal OH
- 15 Marck Jesus Espejo OH
- 17 Rex Emmanuel Intal MB
- 18 Madz Gampong Opp
- 20 Lloyd Josafat MB
- 22 Manuel Sumanguid III L
- 24 Chumason Njigha MB

== Saudi Arabia ==
The following is Saudi Arabia's roster in the 2023 AVC Men's Challenge Cup.

Head coach: (Montenegro) Veselin Vukovic

== South Korea ==
The following is South Korea's roster in the 2023 AVC Men's Challenge Cup.

Head Coach: (South Korea) Im Do-heon

No.	Name	Date of birth	Height	Weight	Spike	Block	2022–23 club
2	Hwang Taek-eui (c)	12 November 1996	1.89 m (6 ft 2 in)	79 kg (174 lb)	—N/a	—N/a	(South Korea) KB Insurance Stars
3	Gim Myeong-gwan	8 July 1997	1.97 m (6 ft 6 in)	77 kg (170 lb)	—N/a	—N/a	(South Korea) Hyundai Capital Skywalkers
5	Park Kyeong-min	5 June 1999	1.70 m (5 ft 7 in)	64 kg (141 lb)	—N/a	—N/a	(South Korea) Hyundai Capital Skywalkers
6	Oh Jae-seong	2 April 1992	1.75 m (5 ft 9 in)	67 kg (148 lb)	—N/a	—N/a	(South Korea) Woori Card Woori Won
7	Heo Su-bong	7 April 1998	1.95 m (6 ft 5 in)	75 kg (165 lb)	—N/a	—N/a	(South Korea) Hyundai Capital Skywalkers
8	Jung Ji-seok	10 March 1995	1.94 m (6 ft 4 in)	88 kg (194 lb)	—N/a	—N/a	(South Korea) Korean Air Jumbos
9	Lim Sung-jin	11 January 1999	1.95 m (6 ft 5 in)	85 kg (187 lb)	—N/a	—N/a	(South Korea) Kepco Vixtorm
11	Kim Min-jae	4 April 2003	1.95 m (6 ft 5 in)	87 kg (192 lb)	—N/a	—N/a	(South Korea) Korean Air Jumbos
14	Hwang Kyung-min	10 April 1996	1.94 m (6 ft 4 in)	83 kg (183 lb)	—N/a	—N/a	(South Korea) KB Insurance Stars
16	Jung Han-yong	31 July 2001	1.94 m (6 ft 4 in)	89 kg (196 lb)	—N/a	—N/a	(South Korea) Korean Air Jumbos
17	Im Dong-hyeok	9 March 1999	2.00 m (6 ft 7 in)	103 kg (227 lb)	—N/a	—N/a	(South Korea) Korean Air Jumbos
18	Jo Jae-young	21 August 1991	1.95 m (6 ft 5 in)	90 kg (200 lb)	—N/a	—N/a	(South Korea) Korean Air Jumbos
20	Lee Sang-hyeon	7 April 1999	2.01 m (6 ft 7 in)	96 kg (212 lb)	—N/a	—N/a	(South Korea) Woori Card Woori Won
23	Park Jun-hyeok	23 February 1997	2.05 m (6 ft 9 in)	88 kg (194 lb)	—N/a	—N/a	(South Korea) Woori Card Woori Won

== Sri Lanka ==
The following is Sri Lanka's roster in the 2023 AVC Men's Challenge Cup.

Head coach: (Sri Lanka) Channa Jayasekara

== Thailand ==
The following is Thailand's roster in the 2023 AVC Men's Challenge Cup.

Head coach: (South Korea) Park Ki-won

- 4 Anut Promchan OH
- 5 Takorn Chuaymee MB
- 8 Prasert Pinkaew MB
- 9 Napadet Bhinijdee OH
- 10 Boonyarid Wongtorn S
- 11 Siwadon Sanhatham L
- 12 Thanathat Thaweerat MB
- 13 Mawin Maneewong S
- 14 Tanapat Charoensuk L
- 19 Christopher Arli Upakam OP
- 20 Chayut Khongrueng MB
- 22 Anurak Phanram OH
- 23 Assanaphan Chantajorn OH
- 25 Kissada Nilsawai MB

== Vietnam ==
The following is Vietnam's roster in the 2023 AVC Men's Challenge Cup.

Head coach: (Vietnam) Trần Đình Tiền

- 1 Huỳnh Trung Trực L
- 2 Trịnh Duy Phúc L
- 6 Phạm Văn Hiệp OP
- 8 Trần Duy Tuyến MB
- 9 Từ Thanh Thuận OP
- 10 Nguyễn Huỳnh Anh Phi S
- 11 Trương Thế Khải MB
- 12 Nguyễn Thanh Hải MB
- 14 Vũ Ngọc Hoàng MB
- 15 Đinh Văn Duy S
- 16 Nguyễn Xuân Đức OH
- 17 Nguyễn Ngọc Thuân OH
- 18 Dương Văn Tiên OH
