= Volleyball at the 2025 SEA Games =

Southeast Asian Games Federation event

- Venue: Indoor Stadium Huamark (indoor); Jomtien Beach (beach)
- Dates: 10–19 December
- Competitors: 251 from 8 nations

Volleyball at the 2025 SEA Games took place in Bangkok and Chonburi, Thailand from 10 to 19 December 2025. The 2025 Games featured competitions in four events. The indoor volleyball competition took place at Indoor Stadium Huamark in Bangkok, and the beach volleyball competitions were held at Jomtien Beach in Chonburi.

== Medal table ==
* Host nation (Thailand)

Rank	Nation	Gold	Silver	Bronze	Total
1	Thailand*	2	2	0	4
2	Indonesia	1	1	1	3
3	Philippines	1	0	1	2
4	Vietnam	0	1	2	3
Totals (4 entries)		4	4	4	12

== Participating nations ==
Nation	Indoor		Beach	
Nation	Men	Women	Men	Women
Indonesia	Yes	Yes	Yes	Yes
Laos	Yes	No	Yes	No
Malaysia	No	Yes	Yes	Yes
Myanmar	Yes	Yes	No	No
Philippines	Yes	Yes	Yes	Yes
Singapore	Yes	Yes	Yes	Yes
Thailand	Yes	Yes	Yes	Yes
Vietnam	Yes	Yes	Yes	Yes
Total: 8 NOCs	7	7	7	6

== Indoor volleyball ==
=== Men's tournament ===
The tournament featured 7 countries. There was one group of three teams and one group of four teams with round-robin format each. The top two of each group played in the semifinal round. The winners of the semifinal round played for the gold medal and the losers played for the bronze medal.

Rank	Team	Pld	W	L
1st place, gold medalist(s)	Thailand	5	5	0
2nd place, silver medalist(s)	Indonesia	4	3	1
3rd place, bronze medalist(s)	Philippines	4	2	2
4	Vietnam	5	2	3
5	Myanmar	4	2	2
6	Singapore	4	1	3
7	Laos	4	0	4

=== Women's tournament ===
The tournament featured 7 countries. There was one group of three teams and one group of four teams with round-robin format each. The top two of each group played in the semifinal round. The winners of the semifinal round played for the gold medal and the losers played for the bronze medal.

Rank	Team	Pld	W	L
1st place, gold medalist(s)	Thailand	4	4	0
2nd place, silver medalist(s)	Vietnam	5	4	1
3rd place, bronze medalist(s)	Indonesia	5	3	2
4	Philippines	4	1	3
5	Singapore	4	2	2
6	Malaysia	4	1	3
7	Myanmar	4	0	4

== Beach volleyball ==
=== Men's tournament ===
The tournament featured 7 countries separated into 2 pools with round robin format. Each country had 2 pairs of players playing in a best of 3 set match. The top two of group played in the semifinal round. The winners of the semifinal round played for the gold medal and the losers played for the bronze medal.

=== Women's tournament ===
The tournament featured 6 countries with round robin format. Each country had 2 pairs of players playing in a best of 3 set match. The top two played for the gold medal and the third and fourth place played for the bronze medal.

== Medalists ==
Event	Gold	Silver	Bronze
Men's indoor volleyball	Thailand; Nattapong Chachamnan; Prasert Pinkaew; Amorntep Konhan; Toopadit Phraput; Napadet Bhinijdee; Anuchit Pakdeekaew; Tanapat Charoensuk; Suwit Mahasiriyothin; Boonyarid Wongtorn; Supakorn Jenthaisong; Anurak Phanram; Narongrit Janpirom; Kissada Nilsawai; Chaiwat Thungkham	Indonesia; Daffa Naufal Mauluddani; Prasojo; Boy Arnez Arabi; Hendra Kurniawan; Jasen Natanael Kilanta; Rama Fazza Fauzan; Fahry Septian Putratama; Tedi Oka Syahputra; Rivan Nurmulki; Kristoforus Sina; Alfin Daniel Pratama; Fahreza Rakha Abhinaya; Agil Angga Anggara; Jordan Susanto	Philippines; Bryan Bagunas; Josh Ybañez; Joshua Retamar; Vince Lorenzo; Kim Malabunga; Rwenzmel Taguibolos; Leo Ordiales; Eco Adajar; Lloyd Josafat; Louie Ramirez; Buds Buddin; Jade Disquitado; Marck Espejo; Al-Bukharie Sali
Women's indoor volleyball	Thailand; Kalyarat Khamwong; Piyanut Pannoy; Pornpun Guedpard; Thatdao Nuekjang; Warisara Seetaloed; Waruni Kanram; Sasipapron Janthawisut; Hattaya Bamrungsuk; Kuttika Kaewpin; Natthanicha Jaisaen; Pimpichaya Kokram; Ajcharaporn Kongyot; Chatchu-on Moksri; Wimonrat Thanapan	Vietnam; Đặng Thị Kim Thanh; Trần Thị Thanh Thúy; Bùi Thị Ánh Thảo; Lê Thanh Thúy; Nguyễn Thị Uyên; Lê Như Anh; Hoàng Thị Kiều Trinh; Nguyễn Khánh Đang; Võ Thị Kim Thoa; Vi Thị Như Quỳnh; Lưu Thị Huệ; Đoàn Thị Lâm Oanh; Lê Thị Yến; Trần Thị Bích Thủy	Indonesia; Ajeng Nur Cahaya; Chelsa Berliana Nurtomo; Mediol Stiovanny Yoku; Yolana Betha Pangestika; Megawati Hangestri Pertiwi; Indah Guretno Dwi Margiani; Ersandrina Devega; Geofanny Eka Cahyaningtyas; Naisya Pratama Putri; Rika Dwi Latri; Pascalina Mahuze; Maradanti Namira Tegariana; Sulastri Rahma Aulia; Syelomitha Afrilaviza Injilia Wongkar
Men's beach volleyball	Indonesia; Bintang Akbar; Sofyan Rachman Efendi; Yosi Ariel Firnanda; Danangsyah Pribadi	Thailand; Dunwinit Kaewsai; Wachirawit Muadpha; Netitorn Muneekul; Banlue Nakprakhong; Poravid Taovato	Vietnam; Lê Hoàng Ý Nguyễn Anh Tuấn; Nguyễn Lâm Tới; Trần Văn Việt
Women's beach volleyball	Philippines; Genesa Jane Eslapor; Bernadeth Pons; Dij Rodriguez; Sisi Rondina; Sunny Villapando	Thailand; Worapeerachayakorn Kongphopsarutawadee; Salinda Mungkhon; Taravadee Naraphornrapat; Rumpaipruet Numwong; Tanarattha Udomchavee	Vietnam; Châu Ngọc Lan; Đinh Thị Mỹ Ngà; Mai Hồng Hạnh; Nguyễn Lê Thị Tường Vy
