= Volleyball at the 2025 SEA Games – Men's tournament =

Men's volleyball tournament at the 2025 SEA Games
- Venue: Indoor Stadium Huamark
- Dates: 13–19 December
- Competitors: 96 from 7 nations

Medalists
gold medal	Thailand
silver medal	Indonesia
bronze medal	Philippines

The men's volleyball tournament at the 2025 SEA Games was held at the Indoor Stadium Huamark in Bangkok from 13 to 19 December 2025.

== Draw ==
The draw for the men's volleyball tournament was held on 19 October 2025 in Bangkok, Thailand.

Pool A	Pool B
Thailand	Indonesia
Vietnam	~~Cambodia~~
Singapore	Philippines
Laos	Myanmar

* Cambodia withdrew from the tournament.

== Participating nations ==
- Indonesia
- Laos
- Myanmar
- Philippines
- Singapore
- Thailand
- Vietnam

=== Squads ===
Indonesia	Laos	Myanmar	Philippines
Daffa Naufal Mauluddani; Prasojo; Boy Arnez Arabi; Hendra Kurniawan; Jasen Natanael Kilanta; Rama Fazza Fauzan; Fahry Septian Putratama; Tedi Oka Syahputra; Rivan Nurmulki; Kristoforus Sina; Alfin Daniel Pratama; Fahreza Rakha Abhinaya; Agil Angga Anggara; Jordan Susanto	Somvung Chandavong; Chanmina Chanthavong; Abou Inthavong; Bounlay Lattanakone; Mido Mouataomoua; Khamthalak Ounaphom; Aling Phaengvanhdy; Philakone Philavan; Voutthixay Phomphakdee; Linthong Phongvichit; Porm Soulivan; Bounkham Southichack; Thanonglith Xaysana; Adisack Xayyavong	Kyaw Aung Myo; Htoo Saw Vitsatar; Phyo Aung Pyae; Tun Zaw Lwin; Kyaw Hlaing Wai; Zaw Chan Nyein; Zaw Hein Moe; Soe Kaung Kin; Maung Oo Phyo Maung; Mg San Nyunt; Wai Ya Htike; Oo Myo Min	Bryan Bagunas; Josh Ybañez; Owa Retamar; Vince Lorenzo; Kim Malabunga; Peng Taguibolos; Leo Ordiales; Eco Adajar; Lloyd Josafat; Louie Ramirez; Buds Buddin; Jade Disquitado; Marck Espejo; Al-Bukharie Sali
Singapore	Thailand	Vietnam	
Ang Jin Yuan; Keshon Chiang Wenyang; Zacchaeus Goh Jun Hui; Jayden Lim Xuan Wei; Jerriel Lim Wei; Edwin Lee Teck Kai; Shergill Ajay Singh; Loh Jay Pun; Muhammad Aniq Aiman bin Shaugi; Avan Cheah Wei Jie; Sun Yao Wei; Jordan Ryan Wong; Wong Chang Wei; Wan Yue Jun	Nattapong Chachamnan; Prasert Pinkaew; Amorntep Konhan; Toopadit Phraput; Napadet Bhinijdee; Anuchit Pakdeekaew; Tanapat Charoensuk; Suwit Mahasiriyothin; Boonyarid Wongtorn; Supakorn Jenthaisong; Anurak Phanram; Narongrit Janpirom; Kissada Nilsawai; Chaiwat Thungkham	Đinh Văn Duy; Trịnh Duy Phúc; Dương Văn Tiên; Quản Trọng Nghĩa; Nguyễn Văn Quốc Duy; Phạm Văn Hiệp; Trần Duy Tuyến; Trương Thế Khải; Nguyễn Thanh Hải; Phan Công Đức; Trần Anh Tú; Nguyễn Ngọc Thuân; Phạm Quốc Dư; Cao Đức Hoàng	

== Preliminary round ==
- All times are Indochina Time (UTC+07:00).

=== Group A ===
Pos	Team	Pld	W	L	Pts	SW	SL	SR	SPW	SPL	SPR	Qualification
1	Thailand (H)	3	3	0	9	9	1	9.000	247	178	1.388	Semifinals
2	Vietnam	3	2	1	6	6	3	2.000	209	170	1.229	Semifinals
3	Singapore	3	1	2	3	4	7	0.571	221	259	0.853	5th place match
4	Laos	3	0	3	0	1	9	0.111	175	245	0.714	5th–7th semifinals

Source: SEA Games Thailand 2025
(H) Host

Date	Time		Score		Set 1	Set 2	Set 3	Set 4	Set 5	Total	Report
13 Dec	15:00	Laos	0–3	Vietnam	13–25	20–25	14–25			47–75	Report
13 Dec	17:30	Thailand	3–1	Singapore	22–25	25–15	25–18	25–20		97–78	Report
14 Dec	17:30	Vietnam	3–0	Singapore	25–12	25–16	25–20			75–48	Report
15 Dec	12:30	Laos	0–3	Thailand	13–25	12–25	16–25			41–75	Report
16 Dec	15:00	Singapore	3–1	Laos	20–25	25–23	25–20	25–19		95–87	Report
16 Dec	17:30	Vietnam	0–3	Thailand	23–25	19–25	17–25			59–75	Report

=== Group B ===
Pos	Team	Pld	W	L	Pts	SW	SL	SR	SPW	SPL	SPR	Qualification
1	Indonesia	2	2	0	6	6	0	MAX	153	122	1.254	Semifinals
2	Philippines	2	1	1	3	3	3	1.000	141	142	0.993	Semifinals
3	Myanmar	2	0	2	0	0	6	0.000	120	150	0.800	5th–7th semifinals

Source: SEA Games Thailand 2025

Date	Time		Score		Set 1	Set 2	Set 3	Set 4	Set 5	Total	Report
13 Dec	12:30	Myanmar	0–3	Philippines	23–25	20–25	21–25			64–75	Report
15 Dec	10:00	Indonesia	3–0	Myanmar	25–15	25–22	25–19			75–56	Report
16 Dec	12:30	Philippines	0–3	Indonesia	17–25	25–27	24–26			66–78	Report

== Final round ==
- All times are Indochina Time (UTC+07:00).

=== 5th–7th places ===
5th–7th semifinals
18 December
Myanmar	3
Laos	0

5th place match
19 December
Singapore	2
Myanmar	3

==== 5th–7th semifinals ====
Date	Time		Score		Set 1	Set 2	Set 3	Set 4	Set 5	Total	Report
18 Dec	12:30	Myanmar	3–0	Laos	25–18	25–23	25–19			75–60	Report

==== 5th place match ====
Date	Time		Score		Set 1	Set 2	Set 3	Set 4	Set 5	Total	Report
19 Dec	12:30	Singapore	2–3	Myanmar	19–25	25–22	25–19	22–25	11–15	102–106	Report

=== Final four ===
Semifinals
18 December
Thailand	3
Philippines	0
18 December
Indonesia	3
Vietnam	2

Gold medal match
19 December
Thailand	3
Indonesia	2
Bronze medal match
19 December
Philippines	3
Vietnam	2

==== Semifinals ====
Date	Time		Score		Set 1	Set 2	Set 3	Set 4	Set 5	Total	Report
18 Dec	15:00	Indonesia	3–2	Vietnam	21–25	20–25	25–22	25–19	15–10	106–101	Report
18 Dec	17:30	Thailand	3–0	Philippines	25–20	25–19	25–21			75–60	Report

==== Bronze medal match ====
Date	Time		Score		Set 1	Set 2	Set 3	Set 4	Set 5	Total	Report
19 Dec	15:00	Philippines	3–2	Vietnam	23–25	23–25	25–18	25–22	16–14	112–104	Report

==== Gold medal match ====
Date	Time		Score		Set 1	Set 2	Set 3	Set 4	Set 5	Total	Report
19 Dec	17:30	Thailand	3–2	Indonesia	25–20	16–25	25–23	23–25	15–12	104–105	Report

== Final standing ==
Rank	Team
1st place, gold medalist(s)	Thailand
2nd place, silver medalist(s)	Indonesia
3rd place, bronze medalist(s)	Philippines
4	Vietnam
5	Myanmar
6	Singapore
7	Laos

Qualified for the 2026 AVC Continental Championship

== See also ==
- Volleyball at the 2025 SEA Games – Women's tournament
