= Philippines men's national volleyball team =

Philippines
- Nickname(s): Alas Pilipinas (lit. 'Philippine Aces')
- Association: Philippine National Volleyball Federation (PNVF)
- Confederation: AVC
- Head coach: Dante Alinsunurin
- FIVB ranking: 92 (15 October 2026)

Uniforms
Home	Away	Third

World Championship
- Appearances: 1 (First in 2025)
- Best result: 19th (2025)

Asian Volleyball Championship
- Appearances: 6 (First in 1975)
- Best result: 5th (1975)
Honours
Event	1st	2nd	3rd
Asian Games (Nine-a-side)	0	0	1
Southeast Asian Games	0	2	6
SEA V.League	0	0	2
Total	0	2	9
Medal record
Asian Games
Bronze medal – third place	1962 Jakarta (Nine-a-side)	Team
Southeast Asian Games
Silver medal – second place	1977 Kuala Lumpur	Team
Silver medal – second place	2019 Pasig	Team
Bronze medal – third place	1979 Jakarta	Team
Bronze medal – third place	1981 Manila	Team
Bronze medal – third place	1983 Singapore	Team
Bronze medal – third place	1991 Manila	Team
Bronze medal – third place	1997 Jakarta	Team
Bronze medal – third place	2025 Bangkok	Team
SEA V.League
Bronze medal – third place	2024 Manila / Yogyakarta	Team

The Philippines men's national volleyball team represents Philippines in international volleyball competitions and friendly matches, governed by Philippine National Volleyball Federation since 2021.

== History ==
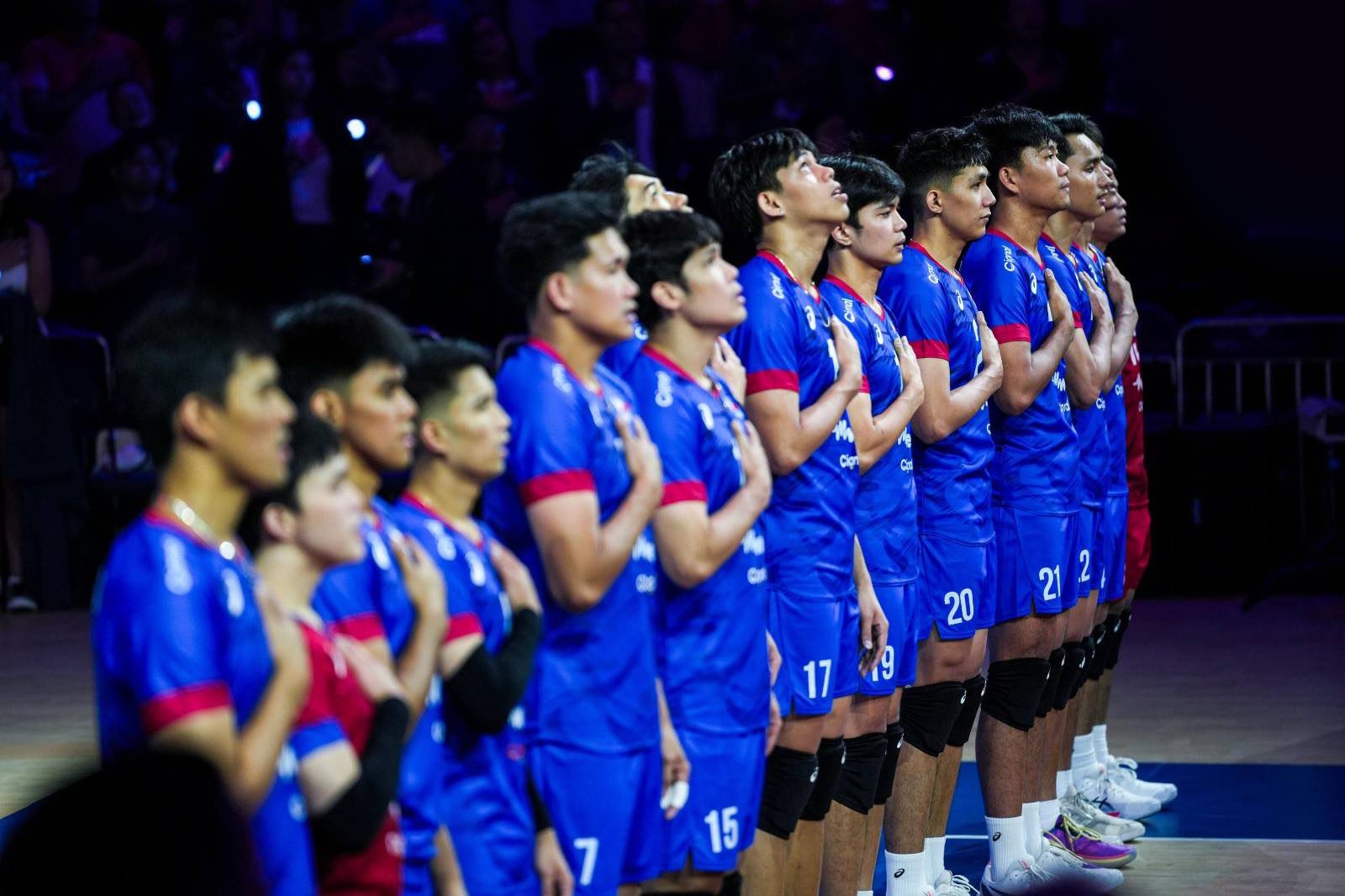
The Philippines at the 2025 FIVB Men's Volleyball World Championship

The national team played as early as the 1910s playing at the 1913 Far Eastern Championship Games where the first international volleyball competition was played.

In the contemporary era, men's volleyball in the Philippines receive less attention than the women's.

The men's national team under coach Dante Alinsunurin would win a silver medal at the 2019 Southeast Asian Games hosted at home marking a milestone in men's volleyball in the Philippines.

However the COVID-19 pandemic would halt training of the men's national team as well as domestic league. This caused the team not be able to repeat their podium finish in the 2021 Southeast Asian Games in Vietnam, which was postponed by a year due to the health crisis.

Alinsunurin was dropped as coach by January 2023, with Brazilian coach Sergio Veloso taking over the team due to participate in the 2023 Southeast Asian Games in Cambodia.

In March 2024, the Philippines was awarded the hosting rights for the 2025 FIVB Men's Volleyball World Championship, consequentially giving the men's national team an automatic berth to their first ever world championship.

As part of the host national team's preparation they entered the 2025 AVC Men's Volleyball Champions League as a club named Cignal HD (namesake of a Spiker's Turf club of the same name). The staff decided not to use any foreign reinforcement despite being allowed to use up to three. They also had a training camp in Morocco, Romania and Portugal.

They made their debut at the 2025 FIVB Men's Volleyball World Championship. They lost their opening game to World No. 40 Tunisia but secured a historic win against World No. 20 Egypt. They exited the tournament with a close 2–3 loss to World No. 15 Iran. They finished 19th place.

== Results ==
=== FIVB-sanctioned tournaments ===
Tournament	Appearances	Finishes				
Tournament	Appearances	Champions	Runners-up	Third place	Fourth place	Total
FIVB Men's Volleyball World Championship	1	0	0	0	0	0
Asian Men's Volleyball Championship	6	0	0	0	0	0
AVC Men's Volleyball Nations Cup	3	0	0	0	0	0
SEA V.League	6	0	0	2	4	6
Total	13	0	0	2	4	6

=== Other regional tournaments ===
Tournament	Appearances	Finishes				
Tournament	Appearances	Champions	Runners-up	Third place	Fourth place	Total
Asian Games	5	0	0	0	1	1
Asian Games (Nine-a-side) (defunct)	2	0	0	1	0	1
Southeast Asian Games	19	0	2	5	0	7
Far Eastern Championship Games (defunct)	7	4	3	0	0	7
Total	33	4	5	6	1	16

== FIVB Senior World Ranking ==
The new calculation method of the FIVB Senior World Rankings started on January 1, 2019, granted all nations automatic world ranking (WR) 100 points, in addition to the score from the previous FIVB World Ranking. The new calculation provides that any inactive nation every January 1 will lose 50 WR points for the next year. An inactive team reaching a WR score of less than 20 WR points will be removed from the ranking list. Due to inactivity or non-participation in annual FIVB-sanctioned events, the Philippines lost 50 WR points and was removed from the world rankings. The Philippine men's national volleyball team became active again in an FIVB-sanctioned event during the 2023 Asian Men's Volleyball Challenge Cup, hence, their reinstatement in the world rankings with 50 WR points.

=== Annual rankings ===
As of July 25, 2026

Key
Best Ranking
Best Mover
Worst Ranking
Worst Mover

Philippines' FIVB Senior Men's World Ranking History
Year	World Ranking		AVC Ranking		Year-end WR Score	Games Played	Won	Lost	Best		Worst	
Year	Rank	Move	Rank	Move	Year-end WR Score	Games Played	Won	Lost	Rank	Move	Rank	Move
2026	98	▼21	25	▼4	37.36	3	1	2	96	▼19	107	▼11
2025	77	▼13	21	▼6	39.82	15	5	10	56	▲8	89	▼33
2024	64	▼1	15	▼3	46.69	4	1	3	57	▲6	64	▼7
2023	63	▲159	12	▲6	50.71	6	3	3	56	▲167	63	▼7

=== Summary of competitions ===
The following table shows the summary of competitions of the Philippines men's national volleyball team in every FIVB-sanctioned event, where it shows the team's standings, results, and the changes in their world ranking score before and after the competition.

Philippines' Summary of Competitions
Event	Host	Rank	Record (W-L)	Pre. WR score	Post. WR score	Pre. World ranking	Post. World ranking	Biggest Win (Pts.)	Biggest Defeat (Pts.)
2026 SEA V Cup (Leg 2)	(Indonesia) Jakarta	5th	1–2	39.82	37.36 ▼	96	98 ▼	Myanmar (5.43) ▲	Cambodia (6.03) ▼
2025 World Championship	(Philippines) Pasay	19th	1–2	29.79	39.82 ▲	82	80 ▲	Egypt (18.14) ▲	Tunisia (8.10) ▼
2025 SEA V.League (Leg 2)	(Indonesia) Jakarta	4th	1–3	34.68	29.79 ▼	69	77 ▼	Cambodia (4.91) ▲	Vietnam (4.59) ▼
2025 SEA V.League (Leg 1)	(Philippines) Candon	4th	2–2	36.80	34.68 ▼	66	69 ▼	Vietnam (8.15) ▲	Indonesia (6.95) ▼
2025 Asian Nations Cup	(Bahrain) Manama	10th	1–3	46.69	36.80 ▼	62	66 ▼	New Zealand (6.04) ▲	Thailand (7.53) ▼
2024 Asian Challenge Cup	(Bahrain) Isa Town	10th	1–3	50.71	46.69 ▼	57	61 ▼	Indonesia (2.04) ▲	Bahrain (2.63) ▼
2023 Asian Challenge Cup	(Taiwan) Taipei	10th	3–3	50.00^{a}	50.71 ▲	N/A	57 ▲	Macau (2.56) ▲	Bahrain (2.90) ▼

Note
a.The 50 points are guaranteed with the intent to compete but are yet to be reinstated in the world rankings before the competition.

== Fixtures and results ==
2026 results

Opponent	Date	Result	Set						WR Pts.^{[5]}	Event	Location
Opponent	Date	Result	1	2	3	4	5	Total	WR Pts.^{[5]}	Event	Location
Cambodia	July 15, 2026	2–3	23–25	30–28	20–25	25–22	8–15	106–115	—N/a	2026 SEA V Cup – First Leg	Candon, Philippines
Indonesia	July 17, 2026	0–3	20–25	23–25	25–27			68–77	—N/a	2026 SEA V Cup – First Leg	Candon, Philippines
Myanmar	July 18, 2026	3–0	25–21	28–26	25–22			78–69	—N/a	2026 SEA V Cup – First Leg	Candon, Philippines
Cambodia	July 23, 2026	0–3	20–25	21–25	24–26			65–76	-6.03	2026 SEA V Cup – Second Leg	Jakarta, Indonesia
Indonesia	July 24, 2026	1–3	18–25	17–25	25–23	19–25		79–98	-1.86	2026 SEA V Cup – Second Leg	Jakarta, Indonesia
Myanmar	July 25, 2026	3–0	28–26	25–17	25–23			78–66	+5.43	2026 SEA V Cup – Second Leg	Jakarta, Indonesia
South Korea	September 27, 2026	0–3	16–25	25–27	22–25			63–77	—N/a	2026 Asian Games	Aichi, Japan
China	September 28, 2026	0–3	21–25	20–25	22–25			63–75	—N/a	2026 Asian Games	Aichi, Japan
Chinese Taipei	September 29, 2026	1–3	25–21	20–25	17–25	27–29		89–100	—N/a	2026 Asian Games	Aichi, Japan
Indonesia	October 1, 2029	1–3	23–25	26–24	22–25	21–25		92–99	—N/a	2026 Asian Games	Aichi, Japan
Uzbekistan	October 2, 2026	3–1	25–19	25–15	23–25	25–17		98–76	—N/a	2026 Asian Games	Aichi, Japan
Kyrgyzstan	October 3, 2026	3–0	25–0	25–0	25–0			75–0	—N/a	2026 Asian Games	Aichi, Japan

== Competition records ==
=== World Championship ===
World Championship record									Qualification record								
Year	Round	Position	Pld	W	L	SW	SL	Squad	Year	Round	Position	Pld	W	L	SW	SL	Squad
(Japan) 2006	Did not qualify								(Philippines) 2005	First Round	3rd in Group	4	2	2	6	8	Squad
(Philippines) 2025	Group stage	19th Place	3	1	2	5	7	Squad	Qualified as hosts								
(Poland) 2027	To be determined								To be determined								
(Qatar) 2029	To be determined								To be determined								
Total	0 Title(s)		3	1	2	5	7	—				4	2	2	6	8	—

=== Asian Championship ===
Asian Championship record
Year	Round	Position	Pld	W	L	SW	SL	Squad
(Australia) 1975	Round Robin	5th place	8	2	4	8	12	No Info
(Thailand) 1993	Group stage	15th place	No Info					
(South Korea) 1995	Group stage	11th place	No Info					
(Qatar) 1997	Classification Round	14th place	No Info					
(Thailand) 2005	Classification Round	14th place	7	3	4	12	14	No Info
(Philippines) 2009	Classification Round	15th place	7	1	6	6	19	Squad
Total	0 Title(s)							—

=== Asian Nations Cup ===
Asian Nations Cup record
Year	Round	Position	Pld	W	L	SW	SL	Squad
(Taiwan) 2023	Classification Round	10th place	6	3	3	12	11	Squad
(Bahrain) 2024	Classification Round	10th place	4	1	3	4	10	Squad
(Bahrain) 2025	Classification Round	10th place	4	1	3	5	10	Squad
Total	0 Title(s)		14	5	9	21	31	—

=== Asian Games ===
Asian Games record
Year	Round	Position	Pld	W	L	SW	SL	Squad
(Japan) 1958	Round Robin	4th place	4	1	3	6	11	No Info
(Indonesia) 1962	Classification Round	9th place	4	0	4	2	16	No Info
(Thailand) 1966	Classification Round	8th place	8	5	3	13	17	No Info
(Iran) 1974	Classification Round	6th place	5	1	4	6	13	No Info
(China) 2022	Group stage	13th place	3	1	2	3	6	Squad
(Japan) 2026	13th place match	13th place	6	2	4	8	13	Squad
Total	0 Title(s)		30	10	20	38	76	—

=== Asian Games: Nine-a-side ===
Asian Games: Nine-a-side record (defunct)
Year	Round	Position	Pld	W	L	SW	SL	Squad
(Japan) 1958	Round Robin	5th place	4	0	4	2	12	No Info
(Indonesia) 1962	Round Robin	3rd place	5	3	2	11	6	No Info
Total	0 Title(s)		9	3	6	13	18	—

=== SEA Games ===
SEA Games record
Year	Round	Position	Pld	W	L	SW	SL	Squad
(Malaysia) 1977	Final	Runners-up	No Info					
(Indonesia) 1979	Round Robin	3rd place	No Info					
(Philippines) 1981	Round Robin	3rd place	No Info					
(Singapore) 1983	Semifinal	3rd place	5	3	2	11	6	No Info
(Thailand) 1985	No Info							
(Indonesia) 1987	No Info							
(Malaysia) 1989	No Info							
(Philippines) 1991	Round Robin	3rd place	No Info					
(Singapore) 1993	No Info							
(Thailand) 1995	No Info							
(Indonesia) 1997	Round Robin	3rd place	No Info					
(Brunei) 1999	did not held							
(Malaysia) 2001	Round Robin	5th place	No Info					
(Vietnam) 2003	Classification Round	5th place	5	2	3	8	9	No Info
(Philippines) 2005	Group Stage	5th place	No Info					
(Singapore) 2015	Group Stage	6th place	3	1	2	3	7	Squad
(Malaysia) 2017	Group Stage	5th place	2	0	2	1	6	Squad
(Philippines) 2019	Final	Runners-up	5	3	2	9	8	Squad
(Vietnam) 2021	Classification Round	5th place	4	2	2	7	8	Squad
(Cambodia) 2023	Classification Round	5th place	5	2	3	6	12	Squad
(Thailand) 2025	Semifinal	3rd place	4	2	2	6	8	Squad
Total	0 Title(s)							—

=== SEA V Cup ===
SEA V Cup record
Year	Round	Position	Pld	W	L	SW	SL	Squad
(Indonesia) 2023 1st Leg	Round Robin	4th place	3	0	3	2	9	Squad
(Philippines) 2023 2nd Leg	Round Robin	4th place	3	0	3	4	9	Squad
(Philippines) 2024 1st Leg	Round Robin	3rd place	3	1	2	4	7	Squad
(Indonesia) 2024 2nd Leg	Round Robin	3rd place	3	1	2	3	8	Squad
(Philippines) 2025 1st Leg	Round Robin	4th place	4	2	2	6	8	Squad
(Indonesia) 2025 2nd Leg	Round Robin	4th place	4	1	3	8	10	Squad
(Philippines) 2026 1st Leg	5th place match	5th place	3	1	2	5	6	Squad
(Indonesia) 2026 2nd Leg	5th place match	5th place	3	1	2	4	6	Squad
Total	0 Title(s)		26	7	18	36	63	—

=== Far Eastern Games ===
Far Eastern Games record (defunct)
Year	Round	Position	Pld	W	L	SW	SL	Squad
(Philippines) 1913	Round Robin	Champions	No Info					
(Republic of China (1912–1949)) 1915	Round Robin	Runners-up	No Info					
(Japan) 1917	Round Robin	Runners-up	No Info					
(Philippines) 1919	Round Robin	Champions	No Info					
(Republic of China (1912–1949)) 1921	Round Robin	Runners-up	No Info					
(Japan) 1923	Round Robin	Champions	No Info					
(Philippines) 1925	Round Robin	Champions	No Info					
(Republic of China (1912–1949)) 1927	No Info							
(Japan) 1930	No Info							
(Philippines) 1934	No Info							
Total	4 Titles							—

=== Other tournaments ===
Other tournament records
Year	Round	Position	Pld	W	L	SW	SL	Squad
(Thailand) 2019 Kor Royal Cup	Semifinal Round	3rd place	4	2	2	7	9	No Info
Total	0 Title(s)							—

== Team ==
=== Current squad ===
The following is the team's final roster for the 2026 SEA Men's V Cup.

Philippine men's national volleyball team for the 2026 SEA Men's V Cup
Position	Name	Date of birth	Height	2025-26 team
OH	Louie Ramirez	April 14, 2000 (age 26)	1.9 m (6 ft 3 in)	(Philippines) Savouge Spin Doctors
OH	Jude Garcia	November 7, 1998 (age 28)	1.8 m (5 ft 11 in)	(Philippines) Criss Cross King Crunchers
OH	Jian Salarzon	October 4, 2003 (age 23)	1.91 m (6 ft 3 in)	(Philippines) Ateneo Blue Eagles
OH	Axel Book			(Philippines) VNS Griffins
OH	Jan Julian Macam (r)	February 3, 2006 (age 20)		(Philippines) UST Golden Spikers
MB	Lloyd Josafat (c)	September 18, 1999 (age 27)	1.88 m (6 ft 2 in)	(Philippines) Criss Cross King Crunchers
MB	Joshua Magalaman	October 24, 2002 (age 24)	1.93 m (6 ft 4 in)	(Philippines) De La Salle Green Spikers
MB	Rodge Alejos			(Philippines) Ateneo Blue Eagles
MB	Trevor Valera (r)	October 14, 2004 (age 22)		(Philippines) UST Golden Spikers
OP	Al-Bukharie Sali	September 23, 2005 (age 21)		(Philippines) UST Golden Spikers
OP	Lirick Mendoza			(Philippines) FEU Tamaraws
S	Greg Ancheta	August 8, 2004 (age 22)		(Philippines) NU Bulldogs
S	Adrian Villados	December 9, 1999 (age 26)	1.82 m (6 ft 0 in)	(Philippines) Criss Cross King Crunchers
L	Josh Ybañez	March 25, 2003 (age 23)	1.7 m (5 ft 7 in)	(Philippines) UST Golden Spikers
L	Vince Lorenzo	July 11, 1999 (age 27)	1.74 m (5 ft 9 in)	(Philippines) AEP Cabstars
L	Vennie Ceballos	October 10, 2006 (age 20)	1.7 m (5 ft 7 in)	(Philippines) FEU Tamaraws

The following persons were assigned by the Philippine National Volleyball Federation as part of the coaching staff.

Coaching Staff
Position	Name
Head coach	(Italy) Angiolino Frigoni
Assistant coach	(Philippines) Odjie Mamon
Assistant coach	(Philippines) Dexter Clamor

=== Former squads ===
FIVB Men's Volleyball World Championship squads

==== 2025 FIVB Men's Volleyball World Championship ====
Philippines (2025 FIVB Men's Volleyball World Championship)

Philippine Men's National Volleyball Team for the 2025 FIVB Men's Volleyball World Championship
Position	Name	Date of birth	Height	2024–25 team
OH	Bryan Bagunas (c)	October 10, 1997 (age 29)	1.95 m (6 ft 5 in)	(Chinese Taipei) Taichung Win Streak
OH	Marck Espejo	March 1, 1997 (age 29)	1.89 m (6 ft 2 in)	(Japan) Kubota Spears Osaka
OH	Michaelo Buddin	June 27, 2001 (age 25)	1.86 m (6 ft 1 in)	(Philippines) NU Bulldogs
OH	Jade Alex Disquitado	May 18, 2004 (age 22)	1.81 m (5 ft 11 in)	(Philippines) NU Bulldogs
OH	Vince Lorenzo	July 11, 1999 (age 27)	1.74 m (5 ft 9 in)	(Philippines) Cignal HD Spikers
MB	Kim Malabunga	May 8, 1996 (age 30)	1.93 m (6 ft 4 in)	(Philippines) Criss Cross King Crunchers
MB	Lloyd Josafat	September 18, 1999 (age 27)	1.88 m (6 ft 2 in)	(Philippines) Cignal HD Spikers
MB	Rwenzmel Taguibolos	October 16, 2001 (age 25)	1.95 m (6 ft 5 in)	(Philippines) NU Bulldogs
OP	Leo Ordiales	January 4, 2003 (age 23)	1.97 m (6 ft 6 in)	(Philippines) NU Bulldogs
OP	Louie Ramirez	April 14, 2000 (age 26)	1.90 m (6 ft 3 in)	(Philippines) Cignal HD Spikers
S	Joshua Retamar	March 7, 2000 (age 26)	1.83 m (6 ft 0 in)	(Philippines) Cignal HD Spikers
S	Eco Adajar	December 29, 2000 (age 25)	1.82 m (6 ft 0 in)	(Philippines) De La Salle Green Spikers
L	Josh Ybañez	March 25, 2003 (age 23)	1.70 m (5 ft 7 in)	(Philippines) UST Golden Spikers
L	Jack Kalingking	March 8, 1996 (age 30)	1.74 m (5 ft 9 in)	(Philippines) PGJC-Navy Sea Lions

The following persons were assigned by the Philippine National Volleyball Federation as part of the coaching staff.

Coaching Staff
Position	Name
Head coach	(Italy) Angiolino Frigoni
Assistant coach 1	(Italy) Alejandro Andres Aldana
Assistant coach 2	(Philippines) Odjie Mamon
Trainer	(Philippines) Dante Alinsunurin
Trainer	(Philippines) Dexter Clamor
Physiotherapist	(Philippines) Hannah Grace De Luna
Team manager	(Philippines) Ronwald Kris Dimaculangan
Doctor	(Philippines) John Wilfred Martin

FIVB Men's World Championship qualification squads

==== 2006 FIVB Men's World Championship AVC Qualification ====
Philippines (2006 FIVB Men's Volleyball World Championship qualification (AVC)
- (Philippines) Cebu 2005 — 1st round
  Gino Macailan, Cesael Delos Santos, Jerricho Hubalde, Ariel Dela Cruz (c), Edcer Penetrante, Janley Patrona, Dante Alinsunurin, Jeffrey John San Jose, Beniamor Lingat, Avelino Tongco, Willy Dela Cruz, Herminio Gallo Jr.
- Head coach: Sergio Isada
- Assistant coach: Ernesto Pamilar

Asian Games squads

==== 2026 Asian Games ====
Philippines (2026 Asian Games)

Philippine men's national volleyball team for the 2026 Asian Games
Position	Name	Date of birth	Height	2025-26 team
OH	Bryan Bagunas (c)	October 10, 1997 (age 29)	1.95 m (6 ft 5 in)	(Japan) Osaka Bluteon
OH	Marck Espejo	March 1, 1997 (age 29)	1.89 m (6 ft 2 in)	(Chinese Taipei) TSG Skyhawks
OH	Buds Buddin	June 27, 2001 (age 25)	1.86 m (6 ft 1 in)	(Philippines) NU Bulldogs
OH	Jude Garcia	November 7, 1998 (age 28)	1.80 m (5 ft 11 in)	(Philippines) Criss Cross King Crunchers
MB	Peng Taguibolos	October 16, 2001 (age 25)	1.95 m (6 ft 5 in)	(Philippines) NU Bulldogs
MB	Lloyd Josafat	September 18, 1999 (age 27)	1.88 m (6 ft 2 in)	(Philippines) Criss Cross King Crunchers
MB	Trevor Valera	October 14, 2004 (age 22)		(Philippines) UST Golden Spikers
MB	Kristofer Rodge Alejos			(Philippines) Ateneo Blue Eagles
OP	Leo Ordiales	January 4, 2003 (age 23)	1.97 m (6 ft 6 in)	(Philippines) NU Bulldogs
OP	Al-Bukharie Sali	September 23, 2005 (age 21)		(Philippines) UST Golden Spikers
S	Owa Retamar	March 7, 2000 (age 26)	1.83 m (6 ft 0 in)	(Cambodia) Visakha VC
S	Adrian Villados	December 9, 1999 (age 26)	1.82 m (6 ft 0 in)	(Philippines) Criss Cross King Crunchers
L	Josh Ybañez	March 25, 2003 (age 23)	1.70 m (5 ft 7 in)	(Philippines) UST Golden Spikers
L	Vince Lorenzo	July 11, 1999 (age 27)	1.74 m (5 ft 9 in)	(Philippines) AEP Cabstars

The following persons were assigned by the Philippine National Volleyball Federation as part of the coaching staff.

Coaching Staff
Position	Name
Head coach	(Italy) Angiolino Frigoni
Assistant coach 1	(Philippines) Odjie Mamon
Assistant coach 2	(Philippines) Dante Alinsunurin
Assistant coach 3	(Philippines) Dexter Clamor
Statistician	(Philippines) Mark Gil Alfafara
Physiotherapist	(Philippines) Hannah Grace De Luna
Team manager	(Philippines) Ronwald Kris Dimaculangan
Doctor	(Philippines) John Wilfred Martin

==== 2022 Asian Games ====
Philippines (2022 Asian Games)

Philippine Men's National Volleyball Team for the 2022 Asian Games
Position	Name	Date of birth	Height	Current team
OH	Bryan Bagunas	October 10, 1997 (age 29)	1.95 m (6 ft 5 in)	(Chinese Taipei) Win Streak
OH	Marck Espejo	March 1, 1997 (age 29)	1.91 m (6 ft 3 in)	(South Korea) Incheon Korean Air Jumbos
OH	Ryan Andrew Ka	November 22, 2000 (age 25)	1.90 m (6 ft 3 in)	(United States) UC San Diego Tritons
OH	Joshua Umandal	March 8, 1998 (age 28)	1.88 m (6 ft 2 in)	(Philippines) AMC Cotabato Spikers
MB	John Paul Bugaoan	January 8, 1999 (age 27)	1.91 m (6 ft 3 in)	(Philippines) Cignal HD Spikers
MB	Lloyd Josafat	September 18, 1999 (age 27)	1.93 m (6 ft 4 in)	(Philippines) Cignal HD Spikers
MB	Kim Malabunga	May 8, 1996 (age 30)	1.95 m (6 ft 5 in)	(Philippines) Imus City–AJAA Spikers
MB	Chumason Njigha	December 5, 1998 (age 27)	1.95 m (6 ft 5 in)	(Philippines) Cignal HD Spikers
OP	Steve Rotter	April 16, 1998 (age 28)	1.98 m (6 ft 6 in)	(Philippines) AMC Cotabato Spikers
S	Vince Mangulabnan (c)	June 3, 1994 (age 32)	1.73 m (5 ft 8 in)	(Philippines) AMC Cotabato Spikers
S	Adrian Villados	December 9, 1999 (age 26)	1.82 m (6 ft 0 in)	(Philippines) Arellano Chiefs
L	Manuel Sumanguid III	January 25, 1998 (age 28)	1.70 m (5 ft 7 in)	(Philippines) Cignal HD Spikers

The following persons were assigned by the Philippine National Volleyball Federation as part of the coaching staff.

Coaching Staff
Position	Name
Head coach	(Brazil) Sergio Valadares Veloso
Assistant coach 1	(Philippines) Arthur Odjie Mamon
Assistant coach 2	(Philippines) Rommel Abella
Trainer	(Philippines) Mark Gil Alfafara
S&C coach	(Philippines) Melchizedek Samonte
Team manager	(Philippines) Jerome Guhit

Asian Men's Volleyball Championship squads

==== 2009 Asian Men's Volleyball Championship ====
Philippines (2009 Asian Men's Volleyball Championship)
- (Philippines) Manila 2009 — 15th place
  Clarence Esteban, Reny John Balse, Raffy Mosuela, Michael Cariño, Jeffrey Malabanan, Edjet Mabbayad, Edcer Penetrante, Dante Alinsunurin (c), Jessie Lopez, Chris Macasaet, Sylvester Honrade, Niño Jeruz
- Head coach: Sinfronio Acaylar
- Assistant coach: George Pascua

AVC Men's Volleyball Cup (previously known as AVC Challenge Cup and AVC Nations Cup) squads

==== 2025 AVC Men's Volleyball Nations Cup ====
Philippines (2025 AVC Men's Volleyball Nations Cup)

Philippine men's national volleyball team for the 2025 AVC Men's Volleyball Nations Cup
Position	Name	Date of birth	Height	Current team
OH	Marck Espejo (c)	March 1, 1997 (age 29)	1.91 m (6 ft 3 in)	(Philippines) Criss Cross King Crunchers
OH	Louie Ramirez	April 14, 2000 (age 26)	1.90 m (6 ft 3 in)	(Philippines) Cignal HD Spikers
OH	Michaelo Buddin	October 3, 2001 (age 25)	1.85 m (6 ft 1 in)	(Philippines) NU Bulldogs
OH	Jackson Reed	June 7, 2001 (age 25)	1.85 m (6 ft 1 in)	(United States) USC Trojans
MB	Kim Malabunga	May 8, 1996 (age 30)	1.95 m (6 ft 5 in)	(Philippines) Criss Cross King Crunchers
MB	John Paul Bugaoan	January 8, 1999 (age 27)	1.91 m (6 ft 3 in)	(Philippines) Cignal HD Spikers
MB	Rwenzmel Taguibolos	October 16, 2001 (age 25)	1.97 m (6 ft 6 in)	(Philippines) NU Bulldogs
MB	Lloyd Josafat	September 18, 1999 (age 27)	1.93 m (6 ft 4 in)	(Philippines) Cignal HD Spikers
OP	Steve Rotter	April 16, 1998 (age 28)	1.98 m (6 ft 6 in)	(Philippines) Cignal HD Spikers
OP	Leo Ordiales	January 2, 2003 (age 23)	1.97 m (6 ft 6 in)	(Philippines) NU Bulldogs
S	Joshua Retamar	March 7, 2002 (age 24)	1.83 m (6 ft 0 in)	(Philippines) Cignal HD Spikers
S	Jerico Adajar	December 29, 2001 (age 24)	1.85 m (6 ft 1 in)	(Philippines) De La Salle Green Spikers
L	Joshua Ybañez	March 25, 2003 (age 23)	1.70 m (5 ft 7 in)	(Philippines) UST Golden Spikers
L	Jack Kalingking	March 8, 1996 (age 30)	1.75 m (5 ft 9 in)	(Philippines) PGJC-Navy Sea Lions

The following persons were assigned by the Philippine National Volleyball Federation as part of the coaching staff.

Coaching Staff
Position	Name
Head coach	(Italy) Angiolino Frigoni
Assistant coach 1	(Italy) Alejandro Andres Aldana
Assistant coach 2	(Philippines) Arthur Odjie Mamon
Trainer	(Philippines) Dante Alinsunurin
Trainer	(Philippines) Dexter Clamor
Physiotherapist	(Philippines) Hannah Grace De Luna
Team manager	(Philippines) Ronwald Kris Dimaculangan
Doctor	(Philippines) John Wilfred Martin

==== 2024 AVC Men's Challenge Cup ====
Philippines (2024 AVC Men's Challenge Cup)

Philippine men's national volleyball team for the 2024 AVC Men's Challenge Cup
Position	Name	Date of birth	Height	Current team
OH	Marck Espejo (c)	March 1, 1997 (age 29)	1.91 m (6 ft 3 in)	Criss Cross King Crunchers
OH	Nico Almendras	July 27, 1999 (age 27)	1.90 m (6 ft 3 in)	NU Bulldogs
OH	Joshua Umandal	March 8, 1999 (age 27)	1.88 m (6 ft 2 in)	Cignal HD Spikers
OH	Noel Kampton	April 2, 2000 (age 26)	1.82 m (6 ft 0 in)	De La Salle Green Spikers
OH	Jade Alex Disquitado	May 18, 2004 (age 22)	1.81 m (5 ft 11 in)	NU Bulldogs
MB	John Paul Bugaoan	January 8, 1999 (age 27)	1.91 m (6 ft 3 in)	Cignal HD Spikers
MB	Rwenzmel Taguibolos	October 16, 2001 (age 25)	1.97 m (6 ft 6 in)	NU Bulldogs
MB	Lloyd Josafat	September 18, 1999 (age 27)	1.93 m (6 ft 4 in)	Cignal HD Spikers
MB	Kim Malabunga	May 8, 1996 (age 30)	1.95 m (6 ft 5 in)	Criss Cross King Crunchers
OP	Leo Ordiales	January 2, 2003 (age 23)	1.97 m (6 ft 6 in)	NU Bulldogs
S	Joshua Retamar	March 7, 2002 (age 24)	1.83 m (6 ft 0 in)	NU Bulldogs
S	Joseph Phillip Bello	August 20, 2003 (age 23)	1.88 m (6 ft 2 in)	NU Bulldogs
L	Joshua Ybañez	March 25, 2003 (age 23)	1.70 m (5 ft 7 in)	UST Golden Spikers
L	Vince Lorenzo	July 11, 1999 (age 27)	1.74 m (5 ft 9 in)	Cignal HD Spikers

The following persons were assigned by the Philippine National Volleyball Federation as part of the coaching staff.

Coaching Staff
Position	Name
Head coach	(Brazil) Sergio Valadares Veloso
Assistant coach 1	(Philippines) Dante Alinsunurin
Assistant coach 2	(Philippines) Arthur Odjie Mamon
Trainer	(Philippines) Dexter Clamor
Physiotherapist	(Philippines) (Japan) Yuichi Akaba
Team manager	(Philippines) Jerome Guhit
Scoutman	(Philippines) Jeffrey Lansangan

==== 2023 AVC Men's Challenge Cup ====
Philippines (2023 AVC Men's Challenge Cup)

Philippine Men's National Volleyball Team for the 2023 AVC Men's Challenge Cup
Position	Name	Date of birth	Height	Current team
OH	Marck Jesus Espejo	March 1, 1997 (age 29)	1.91 m (6 ft 3 in)	(Philippines) Cignal HD Spikers
OH	Ryan Andrew Ka	November 22, 2000 (age 25)	1.90 m (6 ft 3 in)	(United States) UC San Diego Tritons
OH	Noel Michael Kampton	April 2, 2000 (age 26)	182 m (597 ft 1 in)	(Philippines) De La Salle Green Spikers
OH	Joshua Umandal	March 8, 1999 (age 27)	1.87 m (6 ft 2 in)	(Philippines) AMC Cotabato Spikers
MB	Kim Niño Malabunga	May 8, 1996 (age 30)	1.95 m (6 ft 5 in)	(Philippines) Imus City–AJAA Spikers
MB	Rex Emmanuel Intal	September 7, 1994 (age 32)	1.88 m (6 ft 2 in)	(Philippines) AMC Cotabato Spikers
MB	Lloyd Josafat	September 18, 1999 (age 27)	1.93 m (6 ft 4 in)	(Philippines) UE Red Warriors
MB	Chumason Celestine Njigha	December 5, 1998 (age 27)	1.95 m (6 ft 5 in)	(Philippines) Cignal HD Spikers
OP	Steven Charles Rotter	August 16, 1998 (age 28)	1.98 m (6 ft 6 in)	(Philippines) AMC Cotabato Spikers
OP	Madzlan Gampong	March 18, 1995 (age 31)	1.80 m (5 ft 11 in)	(Philippines) AMC Cotabato Spikers
S	Vincent Raphael Mangulabnan (c)	June 3, 1994 (age 32)	1.73 m (5 ft 8 in)	(Philippines) AMC Cotabato Spikers
S	Kim Harold Dayandante	December 8, 1996 (age 29)	1.77 m (5 ft 10 in)	(Philippines) AMC Cotabato Spikers
L	Manuel Sumanguid III	January 25, 1998 (age 28)	1.70 m (5 ft 7 in)	(Philippines) Cignal HD Spikers
L	Vince Patrick Lorenzo	July 11, 1999 (age 27)	1.74 m (5 ft 9 in)	(Philippines) AMC Cotabato Spikers

The following persons were assigned by the Philippine National Volleyball Federation as part of the coaching staff.

Coaching Staff
Position	Name
Head coach	(Brazil) Sergio Valadares Veloso
Assistant coach 1	(Philippines) Arthur Odjie Mamon
Assistant coach 2	(Philippines) Rommel Abella
Trainer	(Philippines) Mark Gil Alfafara
S&C coach	(Philippines) Melchizedek Samonte
Team manager	(Philippines) Jerome Guhit

SEA Games squads

==== 2025 Southeast Asian Games ====
33rd Southeast Asian Games

Philippine Men's National Volleyball Team for the 33rd Southeast Asian Games
Position	Name	Date of birth	Height	Current team
OH	Bryan Bagunas (c)	October 10, 1997 (age 29)	1.95 m (6 ft 5 in)	(Japan) Osaka Bluteon
OH	Marck Espejo	March 1, 1997 (age 29)	1.89 m (6 ft 2 in)	(Philippines) Criss Cross King Crunchers
OH	Michaelo Buddin	June 27, 2001 (age 25)	1.86 m (6 ft 1 in)	(Philippines) NU Bulldogs
OH	Jade Alex Disquitado	May 18, 2004 (age 22)	1.81 m (5 ft 11 in)	(Philippines) NU Bulldogs
MB	Kim Malabunga	May 8, 1996 (age 30)	1.93 m (6 ft 4 in)	(Philippines) Criss Cross King Crunchers
MB	Lloyd Josafat	September 18, 1999 (age 27)	1.88 m (6 ft 2 in)	(Philippines) Cignal HD Spikers
MB	Rwenzmel Taguibolos	October 16, 2001 (age 25)	1.95 m (6 ft 5 in)	(Philippines) NU Bulldogs
OP	Leo Ordiales	January 4, 2003 (age 23)	1.97 m (6 ft 6 in)	(Philippines) NU Bulldogs
OP	Louie Ramirez	April 14, 2000 (age 26)	1.90 m (6 ft 3 in)	(Philippines) Cignal HD Spikers
OP	Al-Bukharie Sali	September 23, 2005 (age 21)	6 ft 5 in	(Philippines) UST Golden Spikers
S	Joshua Retamar	March 7, 2000 (age 26)	1.83 m (6 ft 0 in)	(Philippines) Cignal HD Spikers
S	Eco Adajar	December 29, 2000 (age 25)	1.82 m (6 ft 0 in)	(Philippines) Criss Cross King Crunchers
L	Josh Ybañez	March 25, 2003 (age 23)	1.70 m (5 ft 7 in)	(Philippines) UST Golden Spikers
L	Vince Lorenzo	July 11, 1999 (age 27)	1.74 m (5 ft 9 in)	(Philippines) Cignal HD Spikers

The following persons were assigned by the Philippine National Volleyball Federation as part of the coaching staff.

Coaching Staff
Position	Name
Head coach	(Italy) Angiolino Frigoni
Assistant coach 1	(Argentina) (Spain) Alejandro Andres Aldana
Assistant coach 2	(Philippines) Odjie Mamon
Assistant coach 3	(Philippines) Dante Alinsunurin
Assistant coach 4	(Philippines) Dexter Clamor
Statistician	(Philippines) Mark Gil Alfafara
Physiotherapist	(Philippines) Hannah Grace De Luna
Team manager	(Philippines) Ronwald Kris Dimaculangan
Doctor	(Philippines) John Wilfred Martin

==== 2023 Southeast Asian Games ====
32nd Southeast Asian Games

Philippine Men's National Volleyball Team for the 32nd Southeast Asian Games
No.	Position	Name	Date of birth	Height	Current team
1	S	Vincent Raphael Mangulabnan (c)	June 3, 1994 (age 32)	1.73 m (5 ft 8 in)	(Philippines) AMC Cotabato Spikers
3	S	Kim Harold Dayandante	December 8, 1996 (age 29)	1.77 m (5 ft 10 in)	(Philippines) AMC Cotabato Spikers
4	L	Vince Patrick Lorenzo	July 11, 1999 (age 27)	1.74 m (5 ft 9 in)	(Philippines) AMC Cotabato Spikers
5	OH	Jade Alex Disquitado	May 18, 2004 (age 22)	1.81 m (5 ft 11 in)	(Philippines) D' Navigators Iloilo
6	OH	Michael Raymund Vicente	August 6, 2002 (age 24)	1.93 m (6 ft 4 in)	
7	MB	Jayvee Sumagaysay	April 13, 1995 (age 31)	1.88 m (6 ft 2 in)	(Philippines) AMC Cotabato Spikers
8	OP	Steven Charles Rotter	August 16, 1998 (age 28)	1.98 m (6 ft 6 in)	(Philippines) AMC Cotabato Spikers
9	OP	Jay Rack Dela Noche	July 20, 2002 (age 24)		(Philippines) UST Golden Spikers
10	MB	Leo Ordiales	January 4, 2003 (age 23)		(Philippines) NU Bulldogs
11	OH	Joshua Umandal	March 8, 1998 (age 28)	1.88 m (6 ft 2 in)	(Philippines) AMC Cotabato Spikers
16	MB	Rwenzmel Taguibolos	October 16, 2001 (age 25)		(Philippines) NU Bulldogs
20	MB	Lloyd Josafat	September 18, 1999 (age 27)	1.93 m (6 ft 4 in)	(Philippines) UE Red Warriors
21	MB	Cyrus Justin De Guzman	September 26, 1998 (age 28)	1.98 m (6 ft 6 in)	(United States) Northeast Force
22	L	Manuel Sumanguid III	January 25, 1998 (age 28)	1.70 m (5 ft 7 in)	(Philippines) Cignal HD Spikers

The following persons were assigned by the Philippine National Volleyball Federation as part of the coaching staff.

Coaching Staff
Position	Name
Head coach	(Brazil) Sergio Valadares Veloso
Assistant coach 1	(Philippines) Arthur Odjie Mamon
Assistant coach 2	(Philippines) Rommel Abella
Trainer	(Philippines) Mark Gil Alfafara
S&C coach	(Philippines) Melchizedek Samonte
Team manager	(Philippines) Jerome Guhit

==== 2021 Southeast Asian Games ====
31st Southeast Asian Games

No.	Name	Height	Position	Current club
1	Bryan Bagunas	1.95 m (6 ft 5 in)	Outside Hitter	(Japan) Oita Miyoshi Weisse Adler
2	John Paul Bugaoan	1.90 m (6 ft 3 in)	Middle Blocker	(Philippines) Cignal HD Spikers
4	Ave Joshua Retamar	1.83 m (6 ft 0 in)	Setter	(Philippines) Sta. Elena Construction Wrecking Balls
5	Manuel Sumanguid III	1.70 m (5 ft 7 in)	Libero	(Philippines) Cignal HD Spikers
6	Kim Niño Malabunga	1.95 m (6 ft 5 in)	Middle Blocker	(Philippines) Philippine Air Force Air Spikers
7	Rex Emmanuel Intal	1.91 m (6 ft 3 in)	Middle Blocker	(Philippines) Cignal HD Spikers
9	Angelo Nicolas Almendras	1.90 m (6 ft 3 in)	Outside Hitter	(Philippines) Sta. Elena Construction Wrecking Balls
10	John Vic De Guzman (c)	1.85 m (6 ft 1 in)	Opposite Hitter	(Philippines) PLDT
11	Joshua Umandal	1.88 m (6 ft 2 in)	Opposite Hitter	(Philippines) PLDT
12	Francis Philip Saura	1.95 m (6 ft 5 in)	Middle Blocker	(Philippines) Go for Gold-Air Force
13	Jack Kalingking	1.70 m (5 ft 7 in)	Libero	(Philippines) Global Remit
15	Marck Jesus Espejo	1.90 m (6 ft 3 in)	Outside Hitter	(Japan) FC Tokyo
17	Jessie Lopez	1.75 m (5 ft 9 in)	Setter	(Philippines) Go for Gold-Air Force
19	Ysrael Wilson Marasigan	1.83 m (6 ft 0 in)	Opposite Hitter	(Philippines) Cignal HD Spikers

Coaching staff

- Head coach:
  (Philippines) Dante Alinsunurin
- Assistant coach(s):
  (Philippines) Ariel dela Cruz
  (Philippines) Sherwin Meneses
  (Philippines) Allen Fuentes

Team staff

- Team Manager:
- Team Utility:

Medical staff

- Team Physician:
- Physical Therapist/Trainer:

==== 2019 Southeast Asian Games ====
30th Southeast Asian Games

No.	Name	Height	Position	Current club
1	Bryan Bagunas	1.95 m (6 ft 5 in)	Outside Hitter	(Japan) Oita Miyoshi Weisse Adler
2	Joshua Umandal	1.88 m (6 ft 2 in)	Opposite Hitter	(Philippines) PLDT Home Fibr Power Hitters
3	Ave Joshua Retamar	1.83 m (6 ft 0 in)	Setter	(Philippines) Sta. Elena Construction Wrecking Balls
4	Francis Phillip Saura	1.95 m (6 ft 5 in)	Middle Blocker	(Philippines) Philippine Air Force Air Spikers
6	Kim Niño Malabunga	1.95 m (6 ft 5 in)	Middle Blocker	(Philippines) Philippine Air Force Air Spikers
7	Rex Emmanuel Intal	1.91 m (6 ft 3 in)	Middle Blocker	(Philippines) Cignal HD Spikers
8	Mark Gil Alfafara	1.88 m (6 ft 2 in)	Opposite Hitter	(Philippines) PLDT Home Fibr Power Hitters
9	Fauzi Ismail	1.88 m (6 ft 2 in)	Outside Hitter	(Philippines) Philippine Air Force Air Spikers
10	John Vic De Guzman (c)	1.85 m (6 ft 1 in)	Opposite Hitter	(Philippines) PLDT Home Fibr Power Hitters
11	Alnakran Abdilla	1.90 m (6 ft 3 in)	Outside Hitter	(Philippines) Philippine Air Force Air Spikers
13	Jack Kalingking	1.70 m (5 ft 7 in)	Libero	(Philippines) Philippine Navy Fighting Stingrays
14	Esmilzo Joner Polvorosa	1.81 m (5 ft 11 1/2 in)	Setter	(Philippines) Cignal HD Spikers
15	Marck Jesus Espejo	1.90 m (6 ft 3 in)	Outside Hitter	(Bahrain) Bani Jamra
17	Jessie Lopez	1.75 m (5 ft 9 in)	Setter	(Philippines) Philippine Air Force Air Spikers
19	Ricky Marcos	1.65 m (5 ft 5 in)	Libero	(Philippines) Sta. Elena Construction Wrecking Balls

Coaching staff

- Head coach:
  (Philippines) Dante Alinsunurin
- Assistant coach(s):
  (Philippines) Ariel dela Cruz
  (Philippines) Sherwin Meneses
  (Philippines) Allen Fuentes

Team staff

- Team Manager:
- Team Utility:

Medical staff

- Team Physician:
- Physical Therapist/Trainer:

==== 2017 Southeast Asian Games ====
29th Southeast Asian Games

Philippines (29th Southeast Asian Games) – LVPI
No.	Player	Ht.	Club / College	Position
11	Alnakhran Abdilla		Philippine Air Force Air Spikers	Outside Hitter
10	Johnvic De Guzman (c)		College of Saint Benilde	Opposite Hitter
5	Relan Taneo		Perpetual Help	Setter
9	Geuel Asia		Sta. Elena Wrecking Balls	Setter
8	Mark Gil Alfafara		Cignal HD Spikers	Outside Hitter
6	Bryan Bagunas		Philippine Air Force Air Spikers	Outside Hitter
2	Dave Cabaron		Southwestern University	Outside Hitter
16	Reyson Fuentes		National University	Middle Blocker
3	Bonjomar Castel		Perpetual Help	Middle Blocker
14	Herschel Ramos		Cignal HD Spikers	Middle Blocker
13	Jack Kalingking		Perpetual Help	Libero
4	Gregorio Dolor		IEM Volley Masters	Outside Hitter
Reserves
1	John Carascal		Southwestern University	Outside Hitter
15	Peter Quiel		Far Eastern University	Outside Hitter

Coaching staff

- Head coach:
  (Philippines) Sinfronio "Sammy" Acaylar
- Assistant coach(s):
  (Philippines) Michael "Maki" Cariño

(Philippines) Eddieson Orcullo
(Philippines) Hertito Monzon
(Philippines) Alvin "Bong" Dumalaog
(Philippines) Sandy Rieta

Team Staff

- Team Manager:
  (Philippines) Michael Santos
- Team Utility:
  (Philippines) Alvin Tañada

Medical Staff

- Team Physician:
  (Philippines) Gerardo Asia
- Physical Therapist:
  (Philippines) Randel Siegfred Lapuz

==== 2015 Southeast Asian Games ====
28th Southeast Asian Games

Philippines (28th Southeast Asian Games) – LVPI
No.	Player	Ht.	College	Club	Position
1	Edward Camposano	1.88 m (6 ft 2 in)	UE		Outside Hitter
2	Kheeno Franco	1.90 m (6 ft 3 in)	EARIST	PLDT Home Ultera Ultra Fast Hitters	Middle Blocker
4	Peter Den Mar Torres	1.90 m (6 ft 3 in)	NU	Cagayan Valley Rising Suns	Middle Hitter
6	Sandy Domenick Montero	1.74 m (5 ft 8 1/2 in)	UPHSD	Cignal HD Spikers	Libero
7	Timothy Sto. Tomas Jr.	1.74 m (5 ft 8 1/2 in)	ADMU		Setter
8	Ysrael Wilson Marasigan	1.81 m (5 ft 11 1/2 in)	ADMU		Opposite Hitter
10	John Vic De Guzman	1.88 m (6 ft 2 in)	CSB	PLDT Home Ultera Ultra Fast Hitters	Opposite Hitter
11	Rex Emmanuel Intal	1.90 m (6 ft 3 in)	ADMU	Cagayan Valley Rising Suns	Middle Hitter
12	Andre Joseph Pareja (c)	1.95 m (6 ft 5 in)	ADMU		Outside Hitter
13	Joshua Villianueva	1.90 m (6 ft 3 in)	ADMU		Middle Hitter
14	Esmilzo Joner Polvorosa	1.83 m (6 ft 0 in)	ADMU		Setter
15	Marck Jesus Espejo	1.90 m (6 ft 3 in)	ADMU	Cagayan Valley Rising Suns	Outside Hitter

Coaching staff

- Head coach:
  (Philippines) Oliver Almadro
- Assistant coach(s):
  (Philippines) Sherwin Malonzo
  (Philippines) Ernesto Pamilar

Team Staff

- Team Manager:
- Team Utility:

Medical Staff

- Team Physician:
- Physical Therapist:

SEA Men's V.League squads

==== 2026 SEA Men's V.League ====
Philippines (2026 SEA Men's V.League)

Philippine men's national volleyball team for the 2026 SEA Men's V.League
Position	Name	Date of birth	Height	2025-26 team
OH	Bryan Bagunas (c)	October 10, 1997 (age 29)	1.95 m (6 ft 5 in)	(Japan) Osaka Bluteon
OH	Marck Espejo	March 1, 1997 (age 29)	1.89 m (6 ft 2 in)	(Chinese Taipei) TSG Skyhawks
OH	Buds Buddin	June 27, 2001 (age 25)	1.86 m (6 ft 1 in)	(Philippines) NU Bulldogs
OH	Jude Garcia	November 7, 1998 (age 28)	1.80 m (5 ft 11 in)	(Philippines) Criss Cross King Crunchers
MB	Peng Taguibolos	October 16, 2001 (age 25)	1.95 m (6 ft 5 in)	(Philippines) NU Bulldogs
MB	Lloyd Josafat	September 18, 1999 (age 27)	1.88 m (6 ft 2 in)	(Philippines) Criss Cross King Crunchers
MB	Trevor Valera	October 14, 2004 (age 22)		(Philippines) UST Golden Spikers
MB	Kristofer Rodge Alejos			(Philippines) Ateneo Blue Eagles
OP	Leo Ordiales	January 4, 2003 (age 23)	1.97 m (6 ft 6 in)	(Philippines) NU Bulldogs
OP	Al-Bukharie Sali	September 23, 2005 (age 21)		(Philippines) UST Golden Spikers
S	Owa Retamar	March 7, 2000 (age 26)	1.83 m (6 ft 0 in)	(Cambodia) Visakha VC
S	Adrian Villados	December 9, 1999 (age 26)	1.82 m (6 ft 0 in)	(Philippines) Criss Cross King Crunchers
L	Josh Ybañez	March 25, 2003 (age 23)	1.70 m (5 ft 7 in)	(Philippines) UST Golden Spikers
L	Vince Lorenzo	July 11, 1999 (age 27)	1.74 m (5 ft 9 in)	(Philippines) AEP Cabstars

The following persons were assigned by the Philippine National Volleyball Federation as part of the coaching staff.

Coaching Staff
Position	Name
Head coach	(Italy) Angiolino Frigoni
Assistant coach 1	(Philippines) Odjie Mamon
Assistant coach 2	(Philippines) Dante Alinsunurin
Assistant coach 3	(Philippines) Dexter Clamor
Statistician	(Philippines) Mark Gil Alfafara
Physiotherapist	(Philippines) Hannah Grace De Luna
Team manager	(Philippines) Ronwald Kris Dimaculangan
Doctor	(Philippines) John Wilfred Martin

==== 2025 SEA Men's V.League ====
===== First Leg =====
Philippines (2025 SEA Men's V.League – First Leg)

Philippine men's national volleyball team for the 2025 SEA Men's V.League – First Leg
Position	Name	Date of birth	Height	Current team
OH	Kennedy Batas	September 5, 2001 (age 25)	1.83 m (6 ft 0 in)	(Philippines) Ateneo Blue Eagles
OH	Louie Ramirez	April 14, 2000 (age 26)	1.90 m (6 ft 3 in)	(Philippines) Cignal HD Spikers
OH	Michaelo Buddin	October 3, 2001 (age 25)	1.85 m (6 ft 1 in)	(Philippines) NU Bulldogs
OH	Jackson Reed	June 7, 2001 (age 25)	1.85 m (6 ft 1 in)	(United States) USC Trojans
OH	Jade Alex Disquitado	May 18, 2004 (age 22)	1.81 m (5 ft 11 in)	(Philippines) NU Bulldogs
MB	Kim Malabunga	May 8, 1996 (age 30)	1.95 m (6 ft 5 in)	(Philippines) Criss Cross King Crunchers
MB	Rwenzmel Taguibolos	October 16, 2001 (age 25)	1.97 m (6 ft 6 in)	(Philippines) NU Bulldogs
MB	Lloyd Josafat	September 18, 1999 (age 27)	1.93 m (6 ft 4 in)	(Philippines) Cignal HD Spikers
OP	Steve Rotter	April 16, 1998 (age 28)	1.98 m (6 ft 6 in)	(Philippines) Cignal HD Spikers
OP	Leo Ordiales	January 2, 2003 (age 23)	1.97 m (6 ft 6 in)	(Philippines) NU Bulldogs
S	Joshua Retamar	March 7, 2002 (age 24)	1.83 m (6 ft 0 in)	(Philippines) Cignal HD Spikers
S	Jerico Adajar	December 29, 2001 (age 24)	1.85 m (6 ft 1 in)	(Philippines) De La Salle Green Spikers
L	Joshua Ybañez	March 25, 2003 (age 23)	1.70 m (5 ft 7 in)	(Philippines) UST Golden Spikers
L	Vince Lorenzo	July 11, 1999 (age 27)	1.74 m (5 ft 9 in)	(Philippines) Cignal HD Spikers

The following persons were assigned by the Philippine National Volleyball Federation as part of the coaching staff.

Coaching Staff
Position	Name
Head coach	(Italy) Angiolino Frigoni
Assistant coach 1	(Italy) Alejandro Andres Aldana
Assistant coach 2	(Philippines) Arthur Odjie Mamon
Trainer	(Philippines) Dante Alinsunurin
Trainer	(Philippines) Dexter Clamor
Physiotherapist	(Philippines) Hannah Grace De Luna
Team manager	(Philippines) Ronwald Kris Dimaculangan
Doctor	(Philippines) John Wilfred Martin

===== Second Leg =====
Philippines (2025 SEA Men's V.League – Second Leg)

Philippine men's national volleyball team for the 2025 SEA Men's V.League – First Leg
Position	Name	Date of birth	Height	Current team
OH	Kennedy Batas	September 5, 2001 (age 25)	1.83 m (6 ft 0 in)	(Philippines) Ateneo Blue Eagles
OH	Louie Ramirez	April 14, 2000 (age 26)	1.90 m (6 ft 3 in)	(Philippines) Cignal HD Spikers
OH	Michaelo Buddin	October 3, 2001 (age 25)	1.85 m (6 ft 1 in)	(Philippines) NU Bulldogs
OH	Jackson Reed	June 7, 2001 (age 25)	1.85 m (6 ft 1 in)	(United States) USC Trojans
OH	Jade Alex Disquitado	May 18, 2004 (age 22)	1.81 m (5 ft 11 in)	(Philippines) NU Bulldogs
MB	Kim Malabunga	May 8, 1996 (age 30)	1.95 m (6 ft 5 in)	(Philippines) Criss Cross King Crunchers
MB	Rwenzmel Taguibolos	October 16, 2001 (age 25)	1.97 m (6 ft 6 in)	(Philippines) NU Bulldogs
MB	Lloyd Josafat	September 18, 1999 (age 27)	1.93 m (6 ft 4 in)	(Philippines) Cignal HD Spikers
OP	Steve Rotter	April 16, 1998 (age 28)	1.98 m (6 ft 6 in)	(Philippines) Cignal HD Spikers
OP	Leo Ordiales	January 2, 2003 (age 23)	1.97 m (6 ft 6 in)	(Philippines) NU Bulldogs
S	Joshua Retamar	March 7, 2002 (age 24)	1.83 m (6 ft 0 in)	(Philippines) Cignal HD Spikers
S	Jerico Adajar	December 29, 2001 (age 24)	1.85 m (6 ft 1 in)	(Philippines) De La Salle Green Spikers
L	Joshua Ybañez	March 25, 2003 (age 23)	1.70 m (5 ft 7 in)	(Philippines) UST Golden Spikers
L	Jack Kalingking	March 8, 1996 (age 30)	1.74 m (5 ft 9 in)	(Philippines) PGJC-Navy Sea Lions

The following persons were assigned by the Philippine National Volleyball Federation as part of the coaching staff.

Coaching Staff
Position	Name
Head coach	(Italy) Angiolino Frigoni
Assistant coach 1	(Italy) Alejandro Andres Aldana
Assistant coach 2	(Philippines) Arthur Odjie Mamon
Trainer	(Philippines) Dante Alinsunurin
Trainer	(Philippines) Dexter Clamor
Physiotherapist	(Philippines) Hannah Grace De Luna
Team manager	(Philippines) Ronwald Kris Dimaculangan
Doctor	(Philippines) John Wilfred Martin

==== 2024 SEA Men's V.League ====
===== First Leg =====
Philippines (2024 SEA Men's V.League – First Leg)

Philippine men's national volleyball team for the 2024 SEA Men's V.League – First Leg
Position	Name	Date of birth	Height	Current team
OH	Bryan Bagunas (c)	October 10, 1997 (age 29)	1.95 m (6 ft 5 in)	(Chinese Taipei) Taichung Win Streak Volleyball Club
OH	Michaelo Buddin	June 7, 2001 (age 25)	1.85 m (6 ft 1 in)	(Philippines) NU Bulldogs
OH	Noel Kampton	April 2, 2000 (age 26)	1.82 m (6 ft 0 in)	(Philippines) De La Salle Green Spikers
OH	Jade Alex Disquitado	May 18, 2004 (age 22)	1.81 m (5 ft 11 in)	(Philippines) NU Bulldogs
MB	John Paul Bugaoan	January 8, 1999 (age 27)	1.91 m (6 ft 3 in)	(Philippines) Cignal HD Spikers
MB	Rwenzmel Taguibolos	October 16, 2001 (age 25)	1.97 m (6 ft 6 in)	(Philippines) NU Bulldogs
MB	Lloyd Josafat	September 18, 1999 (age 27)	1.93 m (6 ft 4 in)	(Philippines) Cignal HD Spikers
MB	Kim Malabunga	May 8, 1996 (age 30)	1.95 m (6 ft 5 in)	(Philippines) Criss Cross King Crunchers
OP	Leo Ordiales	January 2, 2003 (age 23)	1.97 m (6 ft 6 in)	(Philippines) NU Bulldogs
OP	Louie Ramirez	May 4, 2000 (age 26)	1.82 m (6 ft 0 in)	(Philippines) Perpetual Altas
S	Joshua Retamar	March 7, 2002 (age 24)	1.83 m (6 ft 0 in)	(Philippines) Cignal HD Spikers
S	Gabriel Ej Casaña	January 18, 1999 (age 27)	1.75 m (5 ft 9 in)	(Philippines) Cignal HD Spikers
L	Joshua Ybañez	March 25, 2003 (age 23)	1.70 m (5 ft 7 in)	(Philippines) UST Golden Spikers
L	Vince Lorenzo	July 11, 1999 (age 27)	1.74 m (5 ft 9 in)	(Philippines) Cignal HD Spikers

The following persons were assigned by the Philippine National Volleyball Federation as part of the coaching staff.

Coaching Staff
Position	Name
Head coach	(Italy) Angiolino Frigoni
Assistant coach 1	(Italy) Matteo Antonucci
Assistant coach 2	(Philippines) Arthur Odjie Mamon
Trainer	(Philippines) Dante Alinsunurin
Trainer	(Philippines) Dexter Clamor
Physiotherapist	(Philippines) (Japan) Yuichi Akaba
Team manager	(Philippines) Jerome Guhit
Scoutman	(Philippines) Jeffrey Lansangan

===== Second Leg =====
Philippines (2024 SEA Men's V.League – Second Leg)

Philippine men's national volleyball team for the 2024 SEA Men's V.League – Second Leg
Position	Name	Date of birth	Height	Current team
OH	Michaelo Buddin	June 7, 2001 (age 25)	1.85 m (6 ft 1 in)	(Philippines) NU Bulldogs
OH	Joshua Umandal	March 8, 1998 (age 28)	1.88 m (6 ft 2 in)	(Philippines) Cignal HD Spikers
OH	Noel Kampton	April 2, 2000 (age 26)	1.82 m (6 ft 0 in)	(Philippines) De La Salle Green Spikers
OH	Jade Alex Disquitado	May 18, 2004 (age 22)	1.81 m (5 ft 11 in)	(Philippines) NU Bulldogs
MB	Kim Malabunga (c)	May 8, 1996 (age 30)	1.95 m (6 ft 5 in)	(Philippines) Criss Cross King Crunchers
MB	Rwenzmel Taguibolos	October 16, 2001 (age 25)	1.97 m (6 ft 6 in)	(Philippines) NU Bulldogs
MB	Lloyd Josafat	September 18, 1999 (age 27)	1.93 m (6 ft 4 in)	(Philippines) Cignal HD Spikers
MB	Jenngerard Arnfranz Diao	February 13, 2001 (age 25)	1.95 m (6 ft 5 in)	(Philippines) NU Bulldogs
OP	Leo Ordiales	January 2, 2003 (age 23)	1.97 m (6 ft 6 in)	(Philippines) NU Bulldogs
OP	Louie Ramirez	May 4, 2000 (age 26)	1.82 m (6 ft 0 in)	(Philippines) Perpetual Altas
S	Joshua Retamar	March 7, 2002 (age 24)	1.83 m (6 ft 0 in)	(Philippines) Cignal HD Spikers
S	Gabriel Ej Casaña	January 18, 1999 (age 27)	1.75 m (5 ft 9 in)	(Philippines) Cignal HD Spikers
L	Joshua Ybañez	March 25, 2003 (age 23)	1.70 m (5 ft 7 in)	(Philippines) UST Golden Spikers
L	Vince Lorenzo	July 11, 1999 (age 27)	1.74 m (5 ft 9 in)	(Philippines) Cignal HD Spikers

The following persons were assigned by the Philippine National Volleyball Federation as part of the coaching staff.

Coaching Staff
Position	Name
Head coach	(Italy) Angiolino Frigoni
Assistant coach 1	(Italy) Matteo Antonucci
Assistant coach 2	(Philippines) Arthur Odjie Mamon
Trainer	(Philippines) Dante Alinsunurin
Trainer	(Philippines) Dexter Clamor
Physiotherapist	(Philippines) (Japan) Yuichi Akaba
Team manager	(Philippines) Jerome Guhit
Scoutman	(Philippines) Jeffrey Lansangan

==== 2023 SEA Men's V.League ====
===== First Leg =====
Philippines (2023 SEA Men's V.League – First Leg)

Philippine Men's National Volleyball Team for the 2023 Southeast Asian Men's Volleyball League — Leg 2
Position	Name	Date of birth	Height	Current team
OH	Noel Michael Kampton	April 2, 2000 (age 26)	182 m (597 ft 1 in)	(Philippines) De La Salle Green Spikers
OH	Joshua Umandal	March 8, 1998 (age 28)	1.88 m (6 ft 2 in)	(Philippines) AMC Cotabato Spikers
OH	Edward Camposano	May 11, 1996 (age 30)	1.85 m (6 ft 1 in)	(Philippines) AMC Cotabato Spikers
MB	Kim Niño Malabunga	May 8, 1996 (age 30)	1.95 m (6 ft 5 in)	(Philippines) Imus City–AJAA Spikers
MB	Jayvee Sumagaysay	April 13, 1995 (age 31)	1.88 m (6 ft 2 in)	(Philippines) AMC Cotabato Spikers
MB	Lloyd Josafat	September 18, 1999 (age 27)	1.93 m (6 ft 4 in)	(Philippines) UE Red Warriors
MB	Chumason Celestine Njigha	December 5, 1998 (age 27)	1.95 m (6 ft 5 in)	(Philippines) Cignal HD Spikers
MB	Cyrus Justin De Guzman	September 26, 1998 (age 28)	1.98 m (6 ft 6 in)	(United States) Northeast Force
OP	Steven Charles Rotter	August 16, 1998 (age 28)	1.98 m (6 ft 6 in)	(Philippines) AMC Cotabato Spikers
OP	Madzlan Gampong	March 18, 1995 (age 31)	1.80 m (5 ft 11 in)	(Philippines) AMC Cotabato Spikers
S	Kim Harold Dayandante (c)	December 8, 1996 (age 29)	1.77 m (5 ft 10 in)	(Philippines) AMC Cotabato Spikers
S	Adrian Villados	December 9, 1999 (age 26)	1.82 m (6 ft 0 in)	(Philippines) Arellano Chiefs
L	Manuel Sumanguid III	January 25, 1998 (age 28)	1.70 m (5 ft 7 in)	(Philippines) Cignal HD Spikers
L	Vince Patrick Lorenzo	July 11, 1999 (age 27)	1.74 m (5 ft 9 in)	(Philippines) AMC Cotabato Spikers

The following persons were assigned by the Philippine National Volleyball Federation as part of the coaching staff.

Coaching Staff
Position	Name
Head coach	(Brazil) Sergio Valadares Veloso
Assistant coach 1	(Philippines) Arthur Odjie Mamon
Assistant coach 2	(Philippines) Rommel Abella
Trainer	(Philippines) Mark Gil Alfafara
S&C coach	(Philippines) Melchizedek Samonte
Team manager	(Philippines) Jerome Guhit

===== Second Leg =====
Philippines (2023 SEA Men's V.League – Second Leg)

Philippine Men's National Volleyball Team for the 2023 Southeast Asian Men's Volleyball League — Leg 2
Position	Name	Date of birth	Height	Current team
OH	Marck Jesus Espejo	March 1, 1997 (age 29)	1.91 m (6 ft 3 in)	(South Korea) Incheon Korean Air Jumbos
OH	Bryan Bagunas	October 10, 1997 (age 29)	1.95 m (6 ft 5 in)	(Chinese Taipei) Win Streak
OH	Ryan Andrew Ka	November 22, 2000 (age 25)	1.90 m (6 ft 3 in)	(United States) UC San Diego Tritons
OH	Joshua Umandal	March 8, 1998 (age 28)	1.88 m (6 ft 2 in)	(Philippines) AMC Cotabato Spikers
OH	Edward Camposano	May 11, 1996 (age 30)	1.85 m (6 ft 1 in)	(Philippines) AMC Cotabato Spikers
MB	Kim Niño Malabunga	May 8, 1996 (age 30)	1.95 m (6 ft 5 in)	(Philippines) Imus City–AJAA Spikers
MB	Rex Emmanuel Intal	September 7, 1994 (age 32)	1.88 m (6 ft 2 in)	(Philippines) AMC Cotabato Spikers
MB	Lloyd Josafat	September 18, 1999 (age 27)	1.93 m (6 ft 4 in)	(Philippines) UE Red Warriors
MB	Chumason Celestine Njigha	December 5, 1998 (age 27)	1.95 m (6 ft 5 in)	(Philippines) Cignal HD Spikers
OP	Steven Charles Rotter	August 16, 1998 (age 28)	1.98 m (6 ft 6 in)	(Philippines) AMC Cotabato Spikers
S	Vincent Raphael Mangulabnan (c)	June 3, 1994 (age 32)	1.73 m (5 ft 8 in)	(Philippines) AMC Cotabato Spikers
S	Adrian Villados	December 9, 1999 (age 26)	1.82 m (6 ft 0 in)	(Philippines) Arellano Chiefs
L	Manuel Sumanguid III	January 25, 1998 (age 28)	1.70 m (5 ft 7 in)	(Philippines) Cignal HD Spikers
L	Vince Patrick Lorenzo	July 11, 1999 (age 27)	1.74 m (5 ft 9 in)	(Philippines) AMC Cotabato Spikers

The following persons were assigned by the Philippine National Volleyball Federation as part of the coaching staff.

Coaching Staff
Position	Name
Head coach	(Brazil) Sergio Valadares Veloso
Assistant coach 1	(Philippines) Arthur Odjie Mamon
Assistant coach 2	(Philippines) Rommel Abella
Trainer	(Philippines) Mark Gil Alfafara
S&C coach	(Philippines) Melchizedek Samonte
Team manager	(Philippines) Jerome Guhit

== Youth teams ==
=== Results ===
==== Asian Men's U20 Volleyball Championship ====
The Philippines' Asian Men's U20 Volleyball Championship record
Year	Round	Position	Pld	W	L	SW	SL	Squad
(Vietnam) 1996	Round Robin	11th place	–	–	–	–	–	–
Total	0 Titles	1 Appearance	7	2	5	9	15	—

== Coaches ==
- (Philippines) Sammy Acaylar (1991)
- (South Korea) Song Yung Ho (2003–?)
- (Philippines) Sergio Isada (2005)
- (Philippines) Sammy Acaylar (2009)
- (Philippines) Oliver Almadro (2015–2016)
- (Philippines) Sammy Acaylar (2017–2019)
- (Philippines) Dante Alinsunurin (2019–2022)
- (Philippines) Odjie Mamon (2023)
- (Brazil) Sérgio Veloso (2023–2024)
- (Italy) Angiolino Frigoni (2024–2026)
- (Philippines) Dante Alinsunurin (2026–)

== See also ==
- Men's
  - Philippines men's national under-23 volleyball team
  - Philippines men's national under-19 volleyball team
  - Philippines men's national beach volleyball team
- Women's
  - Philippines women's national volleyball team
  - Philippines women's national under-23 volleyball team
  - Philippines women's national under-21 volleyball team
  - Philippines women's national under-19 volleyball team
  - Philippines women's national under-17 volleyball team
  - Philippines women's national beach volleyball team
- Philippines national volleyball teams in FIVB club tournaments
- Spikers' Turf
- Volleyball in the Philippines
