= Joshua Magalaman =

Filipino volleyball player (born 2002)

Personal information
- Nickname: Josh
- Nationality: Filipino
- Born: October 24, 2002 (age 24); Binangonan, Rizal, Philippines
- Education: De La Salle University

Volleyball information
- Position: Middle blocker
- Current team: De La Salle University

National team
2026–	Philippines

Joshua Magalaman (born October 24, 2002) is a Filipino volleyball player who plays for the De La Salle Green Spikers of the University Athletic Association of the Philippines.

== Early life and education ==
Joshua Magalaman was born on October 24, 2002, in Binangonan, Rizal. He first entered the Adamson University in Manila before transferring to the De La Salle University.

== Career ==
=== College ===
Joshua Magalaman has previously played for the Adamson Falcons in the University Athletic Association of the Philippines (UAAP). Magalaman moved to De La Salle ahead of the UAAP Season 87 but did not feature for his new school. He however played at the 2024 V-League Collegiate Challenge.

He made his debut for the Green Spikers in UAAP Season 88 in 2026 although he had only limited time playing.

=== National team ===
Joshua Magalaman has played for the Philippine national team. He was scouted by head coach Angiolino Frigoni back in 2024 but his availability was hampered by unspecified issues relating to his college scholarship. Magalaman eventually made his debut at the 2026 SEA V Cup first leg in July.
