= Philippines national volleyball teams in AVC and FIVB club tournaments =

Cignal
- Flag of the Philippines
- Full name: Philippines national volleyball team
- Short name: Cignal
- Founded: 2021
- Owner: Philippine National Volleyball Federation
- Head coach: Angiolino Frigoni
- League: None

The Philippine National Volleyball Federation sent representative teams in the 2021 Asian Men's and Women's Club Volleyball Championships under the name of Rebisco and Choco Mucho, brands of its sponsor Republic Biscuit Corporation. The teams don't belong to a domestic league with its players derived from the pool of the Philippine men's and women's national teams.

The men's team will play as a club again representing the Philippines at the 2025 AVC Men's Volleyball Nations Cup.

== History ==
=== PSL All Stars ===
The Philippines under the previous national federation, Larong Volleyball sa Pilipinas (LVP) has been represented by non-club teams in official FIVB and AVC tournaments. Republic Biscuit Corporation which owns the Rebisco brand has been supporting Philippine volleyball since 2017.

The PSL All-Stars, a selection team from players of the Philippine Super Liga, was the country's representative at the 2016 FIVB Volleyball Women's Club World Championship in Metro Manila rather than a regular club side. That team played as "PSL-F2 Logistics Manila" which finished last among 8th teams in that tournament. The team featured again in the 2017 Asian Women's Club Volleyball Championship as "Rebisco-PSL Manila" due to a sponsorship deal with Republic Biscuit. The team likewise finished last at 8th place. The selection team has also participated in other tournaments in Thailand and the PSL Super Cup.

=== National teams in club tournaments ===
==== Rebisco and PNVF ====
The Philippine National Volleyball Federation succeeded the LVP in early 2021. In June 2021, the PNVF secured a three-year sponsorship deal with Republic Biscuit Corporation. The company pledged to support the federation's national team programs.

The PNVF entered the men's and women's national teams for the 2021 Asian Men's and Women's Club Volleyball Championships under the Rebisco name. For the women's competition, the federation will field two teams composing of national team players. The first team will composed of more established players and the second team will be a developmental side composed of younger players.

Originally, the PNVF planned to send two teams in that competition; the national team under the Rebisco brand and the Chery Tiggo 7 Pro Crossovers winners of the 2021 Premier Volleyball League Open Conference. However Chery Tiggo and all the other teams in the league declined to participate. The PNVF will instead field a second team composing of national team players instead. The second team was named Team Choco Mucho, after another brand of Republic Biscuit Corporation and shares the name with a PVL club, Choco Mucho Flying Titans.

Choco Mucho placed sixth in the 2021 Women's Club Championship, besting the Rebisco team which settled for seventh place. The men's Rebisco team on their part finished 9th out of 10 teams in their tournament.

==== 'Cignal' ====
The men's national team will compete under the name "Cignal" at the 2025 AVC Men's Champions League in Japan, sharing the name of the Cignal HD Spikers – the 2024 Spikers' Turf Invitational Conference champions. This is a result of an approved request by the Philippine National Volleyball Federation to the AVC and is part of the national team's preparation for the 2025 FIVB Men's Volleyball World Championship which the Philippines will be hosting. The staff decided not to use any foreign reinforcement despite being allowed to use up to three. The squad also has players outside the Spikers' Turf club Cignal despite its name. They finished last in the preliminary round conceding games to Osaka Bluteon and Shanghai Bright.

== Current roster ==
The following were the Philippine national team rosters for the 2025 AVC Men's Volleyball Champions League.

Cignal HD Spikers
Number	Position	Name	Date of birth	Height	Other current club
3	S	Joshua Retamar	March 7, 2000 (aged 25)	1.82 m (6 ft 0 in)	(Philippines) Cignal HD Spikers
4	L	Vince Lorenzo	July 11, 1999 (aged 25)	1.75 m (5 ft 9 in)	(Philippines) Cignal HD Spikers
5	OP	Steve Rotter	April 16, 1998 (aged 27)	1.98 m (6 ft 6 in)	(Philippines) Cignal HD Spikers
7	MB	Kim Malabunga	May 8, 1996 (aged 29)	1.95 m (6 ft 5 in)	(Philippines) Criss Cross King Crunchers
8	MB	John Paul Bugaoan (c)	January 8, 1999 (aged 26)	1.88 m (6 ft 2 in)	(Philippines) Cignal HD Spikers
10	S	EJ Casaña	January 18, 1999 (aged 26)	1.75 m (5 ft 9 in)	(Philippines) Cignal HD Spikers
11	OH	Joshua Umandal	March 8, 1999 (aged 26)	1.87 m (6 ft 2 in)	(Philippines) Cignal HD Spikers
14	L	John Michael Paglaon	June 5, 2000 (aged 24)	1.78 m (5 ft 10 in)	(Philippines) Savouge Spin Doctors
15	OH	Marck Espejo	March 1, 1997 (aged 28)	1.91 m (6 ft 3 in)	(Philippines) Criss Cross King Crunchers
16	MB	Gian Glorioso	June 8, 1997 (aged 27)	1.94 m (6 ft 4 in)	(Philippines) Criss Cross King Crunchers
17	OH	Miguel Wendel	August 21, 1995 (aged 29)	1.80 m (5 ft 11 in)	(Philippines) Cignal HD Spikers
20	MB	Lloyd Josafat	September 18, 1999 (aged 25)	1.88 m (6 ft 2 in)	(Philippines) Cignal HD Spikers
21	OH	Louie Ramirez	April 14, 2000 (aged 25)	1.90 m (6 ft 3 in)	(Philippines) Cignal HD Spikers
25	OP	Ike Barilea	November 9, 2004 (aged 20)	1.88 m (6 ft 2 in)	(Philippines) One Silay

Source:AVC and Philippine Daily Inquirer

== Previous rosters ==
The following were the Philippine national team rosters for the 2021 Asian Men's and Women's Club Volleyball Championships.

=== Men's ===
Team Rebisco (2021)

Team Rebisco
Number	Position	Name	Date of birth	Height	Other current club
2	MB	John Paul Bugaoan	January 8, 1999 (aged 22)	1.90 m (6 ft 3 in)	(Philippines) Cignal HD Spikers
4	S	Joshua Retamar	March 7, 2000 (aged 21)	1.82 m (6 ft 0 in)	(Philippines) Sta. Elena Ball Hammers
5	L	Manuel Sumanguid III	January 5, 1998 (aged 23)	1.70 m (5 ft 7 in)	(Philippines) Cignal HD Spikers
6	MB	Kim Malabunga	May 8, 1996 (aged 25)	1.98 m (6 ft 6 in)	(Philippines) Go for Gold-Air Force
7	MB	Rex Intal	September 7, 1994 (aged 27)	1.90 m (6 ft 3 in)	(Philippines) Cignal HD Spikers
8	OP	Mark Alfafara	January 28, 1994 (aged 27)	1.83 m (6 ft 0 in)	(Philippines) PLDT
9	OH	Angelo Almendras	July 27, 1999 (aged 22)	1.90 m (6 ft 3 in)	(Philippines) Sta. Elena Ball Hammers
10	OH	John Vic De Guzman (c)	September 23, 1993 (aged 28)	1.88 m (6 ft 2 in)	(Philippines) PLDT
11	OH	Joshua Umandal	March 8, 1999 (aged 22)	1.88 m (6 ft 2 in)	(Philippines) PLDT
12	MB	Francis Philip Saura	May 2, 1996 (aged 25)	1.95 m (6 ft 5 in)	(Philippines) Go for Gold-Air Force
14	S	Esmilzo Polvorosa	March 22, 1997 (aged 24)	1.83 m (6 ft 0 in)	(Philippines) Cignal HD Spikers
16	L	Ricky Marcos	August 1, 1996 (aged 25)	1.62 m (5 ft 4 in)	(Philippines) Sta. Elena Ball Hammers
17	S	Jessie Lopez	March 29, 1986 (aged 35)	1.78 m (5 ft 10 in)	(Philippines) Go for Gold-Air Force
19	OP	Ysrael Marasigan	September 24, 1994 (aged 27)	1.83 m (6 ft 0 in)	(Philippines) Cignal HD Spikers

Source: PNVF and match #21 P–2

=== Women's ===
Team Rebisco (2021)

Team Rebisco
Number	Position	Name	Date of birth	Height	Other current club
2	MB	Abigail Maraño	December 22, 1992 (aged 28)	1.75 m (5 ft 9 in)	(Philippines) F2 Logistics Cargo Movers
4	OH	Mhicaela Belen	June 29, 2002 (aged 19)	1.71 m (5 ft 7 in)	(Philippines) National University
5	MB	Imee Hernandez	November 6, 2000 (aged 20)	1.80 m (5 ft 11 in)	(Philippines) University of Santo Tomas
6	L	Bernadette Pepito	October 27, 2002 (aged 18)	1.57 m (5 ft 2 in)	(Philippines) University of Santo Tomas High School
7	S	Rhea Dimaculangan	March 21, 1991 (aged 30)	1.70 m (5 ft 7 in)	(Philippines) PLDT Home Fibr Power Hitters
8	OH	Ejiya Laure	March 20, 1999 (aged 22)	1.77 m (5 ft 10 in)	(Philippines) University of Santo Tomas
9	L	Jennifer Nierva	November 8, 1999 (aged 21)	1.64 m (5 ft 5 in)	(Philippines) National University
10	MB	Mary Joy Baron (c)	December 10, 1995 (aged 25)	1.82 m (6 ft 0 in)	(Philippines) F2 Logistics Cargo Movers
11	OP	Faith Nisperos	January 2, 2000 (aged 21)	1.80 m (5 ft 11 in)	(Philippines) Ateneo de Manila University
15	OH	Jessica Galanza	November 28, 1996 (aged 24)	1.70 m (5 ft 7 in)	(Philippines) Creamline Cool Smashers
16	OP	Aleona Denise Manabat	September 26, 1993 (aged 28)	1.88 m (6 ft 2 in)	(Philippines) Chery Tiggo 7 Pro Crossovers
17	S	Kamille Cal	April 25, 2001 (aged 20)	1.79 m (5 ft 10 in)	(Philippines) National University
21	MB	Ivy Lacsina	October 21, 1999 (aged 21)	1.85 m (6 ft 1 in)	(Philippines) National University
26	OP	Kim Kianna Dy	July 16, 1995 (aged 26)	1.78 m (5 ft 10 in)	(Philippines) F2 Logistics Cargo Movers

Sources: AVC and match #15 P–2

Team Choco Mucho (2021)

Team Choco Mucho
Number	Position	Name	Date of birth	Height	Other current club
1	OH	Kalei Mau	October 5, 1995 (aged 25)	1.85 m (6 ft 1 in)	(Puerto Rico) Changos de Naranjito
3	S	Deanna Wong	July 18, 1998 (aged 23)	1.73 m (5 ft 8 in)	(Philippines) Choco Mucho Flying Titans
7	OH	Mylene Paat	April 5, 1994 (aged 27)	1.80 m (5 ft 11 in)	(Philippines) Chery Tiggo Crossovers
8	S	Angelica Cayuna	August 17, 1998 (aged 23)	1.68 m (5 ft 6 in)	(Philippines) Perlas Spikers
11	OP	MJ Phillips	June 15, 1995 (aged 26)	1.83 m (6 ft 0 in)	(Philippines) Sta. Lucia Lady Realtors
13	MB	Dell Palomata	November 1, 1995 (aged 25)	1.90 m (6 ft 3 in)	(Philippines) Sta. Lucia Lady Realtors
18	MB	Marivic Meneses	October 18, 1995 (aged 25)	1.85 m (6 ft 1 in)	(Philippines) Petro Gazz Angels
23	L	Dawn Macandili	June 1, 1996 (aged 25)	1.52 m (5 ft 0 in)	(Philippines) F2 Logistics Cargo Movers
32	S	Iris Tolenada (c)	August 21, 1991 (aged 30)	1.75 m (5 ft 9 in)	free agent
56	OH	Ernestine Tiamzon	May 4, 1997 (aged 24)	1.75 m (5 ft 9 in)	(Philippines) F2 Logistics Cargo Movers

- Katrina Tolentino was replaced by Cayuna with the former withdrawing from the team due to health reasons.
- Kim Kianna Dy and Mary Joy Baron were moved to Rebisco, due to the latter needing a minimum of ten players. Four of Rebisco's players were rendered unavailable after they were asked to comply with additional local health and safety protocols.

Sources: AVC and match #15 P–2

== Competitive record ==
=== Men's ===
==== Asian Club Championship ====
- (Thailand) 2021 (Rebisco) – 9th place
- (Japan) 2025 (Cignal) – 11th place

=== Women's ===
==== Asian Club Championship ====
- (Thailand) 2021
  - First team (Rebisco) – 7th place
  - Second team (Choco Mucho) – 6th place

== Head coaches ==
Men's

Team	Coach	Tournament
Rebisco	(Philippines) Dante Alinsunurin	2021 Asian Men's Club Volleyball Championship
Cignal	(Italy) Angiolino Frigoni	2025 AVC Men's Champions League

Women's

Team	Coach	Tournament
Rebisco	(Brazil) Jorge Edson	2021 Asian Women's Club Volleyball Championship
Choco Mucho	(Philippines) Odjie Mamon	2021 Asian Women's Club Volleyball Championship

== See also ==
- PLDT HOME TVolution team – non-league men's and women's team formed specifically for the 2014 Asian Men's and Women's Club Championships
- Philippines men's national basketball team in FIBA club tournaments – another national team which was entered in tournaments meant for clubs
- Philippines men's national volleyball team – national volleyball team representing Philippines
- Philippines women's national volleyball team – national volleyball team representing Philippines
