= Sergio Veloso =

Brazilian volleyball coach

Personal information
- Full name: Sergio Valadares Veloso
- Nationality: Brazilian

Coaching information
- Current team: Indonesia (men)
Previous teams coached
Years	Teams
2023–2024; 2023–2026; 2026–	Philippines (men); Ateneo Blue Eagles (women); Indonesia (men)

Sergio Valadares Veloso is a Brazilian volleyball coach who is the head coach of the Indonesia men's national volleyball team.

== Career ==
=== Philippines ===
Veloso has been a coach for thirty years, when Sergio Veloso was appointed as head coach of the Philippines men's national volleyball team in March 2023. He was recommended to the Philippines under the FIVB's Volleyball Empowerment program. He guided the team in the 2023 SEA Games in Cambodia, finishing fifth in the men's volleyball tournament.

In June 2024, Angiolino Frigoni was named as Veloso's replacement

=== Ateneo women's ===
In July 2023, the Ateneo Blue Eagles women's volleyball team tapped Veloso as head coach in the lead up to Season 86 of the University Athletic Association of the Philippines (UAAP). Veloso was the successor of Oliver Almadro for the coaching role in the collegiate team.

Veloso left Ateneo after the conclusion of Season 88 in April 2026.

=== Indonesia ===
Veloso was appointed as the head coach of the Indonesia men's national volleyball team for the 2026 AVC Men's Volleyball Nations Cup.
