= Josh Ybañez =

Filipino volleyball player (born 2003)

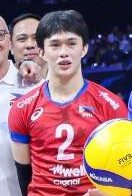
- Ybañez in 2025

Personal information
- Nationality: Filipino
- Born: March 25, 2003 (age 23) General Santos, Philippines
- Education: University of Santo Tomas
- Height: 170 cm (5 ft 7 in)

Volleyball information
- Position: Outside Hitter, Libero
- Current team: UST Golden Spikers
- Number: 13

National team
- Years: Team
- 2024–: Philippines
Honours
Men's volleyball
Representing Philippines
Southeast Asian Games
| Bronze medal – third place | 2025 Bangkok | Team |
SEA V.League
| Bronze medal – third place | 2024 Manila | Team |
| Bronze medal – third place | 2024 Yogyakarta | Team |

Josh Ybañez (born March 25, 2003) is a Filipino volleyball player. He is currently playing for the UST Golden Spikers in the UAAP as an outside hitter. He is also an active member of the national team playing as the libero.

== Early life ==
Josh Ybañez was born on March 25, 2003, in General Santos, Philippines. His brothers inspired him to took up volleyball.

== Career ==
=== Collegiate ===
Ybañez joined the Golden Spikers of the University of Santo Tomas (UST) of the University Athletic Association of the Philippines (UAAP). Under the mentorship of head coach Odjie Mamon, Ybanez started as a bench player for the Golden Spikers at the 2022 V-League Collegiate Challenge.

He made his first UAAP appearance in the men's volleyball with UST Golden Spikers in UAAP Season 85 in 2023, where they bagged the silver medal. He also awarded as the Rookie of the Year and Season's Most Valuable Player (MVP). The NU Bulldogs were champions for that season.

UST finished as runners-up again to NU in Season 86 in 2024.

In 2025, UST finished outside of the Final Four in UAAP Season 87. Ybanez played at the 2025 V-League Collegiate Challenge where UST finished as semifinalists. He then played for the Golden Spikers (as UST–Gameville) at the Spikers' Turf.

In UAAP Season 88 in 2026, the Golden Spikers once again finished outside the Final Four, but Ybañez was praised by UST's coaches for "carrying" the team. He received his third-ever MVP award as was also named Best Outside Spiker.

Ybañez has committed to exhaust his final year of college eligibility and will play in UAAP Season 89.

=== National team ===
Ybañez has played for the Philippine national team as a libero. He debuted for his country at the 2024 AVC Men's Challenge Cup in Bahrain.

He was part of the roster of the host country's team at the 2025 FIVB Men's Volleyball World Championship.

Ybañez debuted at the SEA Games in the 2025 edition in Thailand. The Philippines finished as bronze medallists.

== Personal life ==
Ybañez is open about being LGBTQ. He has disclosed his struggles dealing with self-esteem growing up and has pursued inspiring other LGBTQ youth through his role as a volleyball player.

== Awards ==
=== Individuals ===
| Year | League | Season/Conference | Award | Ref |
|---|---|---|---|---|
| 2023 | UAAP | 85 | Season's Most Valuable Player | |
| 2023 | UAAP | 85 | Rookie of the Year | |
| 2023 | UAAP | 85 | 1st Best Outside Hitter | |
| 2023 | V-League | Collegiate | Conference's Most Valuable Player | |
| 2023 | PNVF | Challenge Cup | Most Valuable Player | |
| 2023 | PNVF | Challenge Cup | 1st Best Outside Spiker | |
| 2024 | UAAP | 86 | Season's Most Valuable Player | |
| 2024 | UAAP | 86 | 1st Best Outside Hitter | |
| 2025 | SEA V.League | Leg 2 | Best Libero | |
| 2026 | UAAP | 88 | Season's Most Valuable Player | |
| 2026 | UAAP | 88 | 1st Best Outside Spiker | |
| 2026 | SEA V Cup | Leg 1 | Best Libero | |

=== Collegiate ===
UST Golden Spikers

| Year | League | Season/Conference | Title | Ref |
|---|---|---|---|---|
| 2022 | V-League | Collegiate | Runner-up | |
| 2023 | UAAP | 85 | Runner-up | |
| 2023 | V-League | Collegiate | Runner-up | |
| 2023 | PNVF | Challenge Cup | Champions | |
| 2024 | UAAP | 86 | Runner-up | |
| 2025 | UAAP | 87 | 3rd place | |
| 2025 | V-League | Collegiate | 3rd place | |
| 2026 | UAAP | 88 | 3rd place | |

=== National Team ===
| Year | League | Season/Conference | Title | Ref |
|---|---|---|---|---|
| 2024 | SEA V.League | Leg 1 | 3rd place | |
| 2024 | SEA V.League | Leg 2 | 3rd place | |
| 2025 | SEA Games | Indoor Volleyball | 3rd place | |
