= Angiolino Frigoni =

Italian volleyball coach

Personal information
- Nickname: Angelo
- Nationality: Italian
- Born: 17 March 1954 (age 72); Brescia, Italy
- Hometown: Carpenedolo

Coaching information
- Current team: Philippines (women)
Previous teams coached
Years	Teams
1998–2000; 2001–2004; 2004–2005; 2007–?; 2012–2013; 2015; 2020–2021; 2024–2026; 2026–	Italy (women); Netherlands (women); Asystel Novara; Ural Ufa; Rabita Baku; Egypt (men); Italy U21 (men); Philippines (men); Philippines (women)
Honours
Men's volleyball
Head coach Egypt
African Championship
Gold medal – first place	2015 Cairo
Head coach Italy
U21 World Championship
Gold medal – first place	2021 Italy / Bulgaria
Head coach Philippines
SEA V.League
Bronze medal – third place	2024 Yogyakarta	Leg 2
Southeast Asian Games
Bronze medal – third place	2025 Bangkok	Team

Angiolino Frigoni is an Italian volleyball coach who is the head coach of the Philippines women's national volleyball team.

== Early life ==
Angelo Frigoni was born on 17 March 1954 in Brescia. He grew up in Carpenedolo and was a player for a local team which competed in the Terza Divisione and later Serie B. An injury led him to coaching.

== Career ==
Frigoni started coaching in 1986 with Montichiari.

=== Italy men's ===
Frigoni was the assistant coach of the Italian men's national team, alongside Julio Velasco from 1990 until 1996. With the national team, Frigoni won two World Championships (1990 and 1994); three European titles (1989, 1993, 1995); a World Cup (1995) and five World Leagues.

=== Italy women's ===
When Velasco became Italy's women's national team head coach, Frigoni followed suit. Frigoni replaced Velasco as coach in 1998. He helped the women's team win the bronze medal at the 1999 European Championship and qualify them for the 2000 Summer Olympics in Sydney; their first ever women's tournament qualification. They finished ninth.

=== Netherlands women's ===
From 2001 to 2004, Frigoni coached of the Netherlands women's national team.

=== Return to club volleyball ===
Frigoni returned to Italy and coached Asystel Novara from 2004 to 2005. In 2007, Frigoni went to Russia to coach Ural Ufa. He also coached the Azeri team Rabita Baku and was the losing finalist of the 2012–13 CEV Women's Champions League.

=== Egypt men's ===
Frigoni became coach of Egypt men's national team and guided them in winning the 2015 Men's African Volleyball Championship. He was injured in August 2015 and was replaced by Flavio Gulinelli in November.

=== Italy U21 ===
Frigoni was coach for the Italy U21 which won the 2021 FIVB Volleyball Men's U21 World Championship.

=== Philippine men's ===
The Philippines men's national team assigned Frigoni as their head coach in mid-2024. In his first tournament, the leg 2 of the 2024 SEA Men's V.League, the Philippines finished as bronze medallists.

Frigoni led the team to a 19th place finish in the 32-team 2025 FIVB Men's Volleyball World Championship which was helped by a win against Egypt. The Philippines also won a brozne medal in the 2025 SEA Games in Thailand.

His performance led to the national federation to extend his contract which was set to last until July 2026.

=== Philippine women's ===
In October 2026, Frigoni was reassigned to the Philippines women's national team as part of a larger reorganization with Dante Alinsunurin appointed to his former role with the women's team.

== Honours ==
Egypt men's national team:

- 1 African Championship: 2015

Italy men's U21 national team:

- 1 World Championship: 2021

Philippines men's national team:

- SEA V.League
  - 3rd place 1: 2024 (2nd leg)

Rabita Baku:

- CEV Women's Champions League
  - Runner-up 1: 2012–13
