= Nine-a-side volleyball at the 1962 Asian Games – Men's tournament =

Men at the 1962 Asian Games
- Venue: Senayan Volleyball Stadium
- Date: 25 August – 1 September 1962
- Nations: 6

Medalists
gold medal	Japan
silver medal	South Korea
bronze medal	Philippines

This page presents the results of the Men's 9-man Volleyball Tournament at the 1962 Asian Games, which was held from 25 August to 1 September 1962 in Jakarta, Indonesia.

== Results ==
Pos	Team	Pld	W	L	Pts	SW	SL	SR	SPW	SPL	SPR
1	Japan	5	5	0	10	15	1	15.000	—	—	—
2	South Korea	5	4	1	9	13	4	3.250	—	—	—
3	Philippines	5	3	2	8	11	6	1.833	328	325	1.009
4	Indonesia	5	2	3	7	8	9	0.889	307	301	1.020
5	Singapore	5	1	4	6	3	12	0.250	180	295	0.610
6	Malaya	5	0	5	5	0	15	0.000	163	315	0.517

Source: Results

Date		Score		Set 1	Set 2	Set 3	Set 4	Set 5	Total
25 Aug	South Korea	3–0	Malaya	21–4	21–12	21–8			63–24
25 Aug	Philippines	3–0	Singapore	21–10	21–7	21–11			63–28
25 Aug	Indonesia	0–3	Japan	16–21	10–21	9–21			35–63
27 Aug	Japan	3–1	South Korea						
27 Aug	Malaya	0–3	Philippines	18–21	10–21	10–21			38–63
28 Aug	Japan	3–0	Malaya	21–6	21–10	21–5			63–21
28 Aug	Indonesia	0–3	South Korea	13–21	19–21	16–21			48–63
29 Aug	Indonesia	3–0	Malaya	21–11	21–11	21–15			63–37
29 Aug	Japan	3–0	Singapore	21–2	21–0	21–15			63–17
30 Aug	South Korea	3–0	Singapore	21–16	21–5	21–12			63–33
30 Aug	Indonesia	2–3	Philippines	15–21	23–25	21–16	21–16	18–21	98–99
31 Aug	Japan	3–1	Philippines	21–8	15–21	21–5	21–9		78–43
31 Aug	Indonesia	3–0	Singapore	21–13	21–14	21–12			63–39
01 Sep	South Korea	3–1	Philippines	20–22	21–6	21–15	21–17		83–60
01 Sep	Malaya	0–3	Singapore	16–21	9–21	18–21			43–63

== Final standing ==
Rank	Team	Pld	W	L
1st place, gold medalist(s)	Japan	5	5	0
2nd place, silver medalist(s)	South Korea	5	4	1
3rd place, bronze medalist(s)	Philippines	5	3	2
4	Indonesia	5	2	3
5	Singapore	5	1	4
6	Malaya	5	0	5
