= Volleyball at the Far Eastern Championship Games =

Volleyball was contested at the Far Eastern Championship Games and was one of the eight main sports on the programme.

== Editions ==
Games	Year	Host city	Host country	Champion
I	1913	Manila	Philippines	Philippines
II	1915	Shanghai	China	China
III	1917	Tokyo	Japan	China
IV	1919	Manila	Philippines	Philippines
V	1921	Shanghai	China	China
VI	1923	Osaka	Japan	Philippines
VII	1925	Manila	Philippines	Philippines
VIII	1927	Shanghai	China	No information
IX	1930	Tokyo	Japan	No information
X	1934	Manila	Philippines	No information

== Exhibition ==
At the 1923 edition, women's volleyball was an exhibition event. Japan, represented by students of the Himeji Women's Higher School were champions with the Republic of China as runners-up. It was also held in the 1930 editions with Japan, China and the Philippines sending volleyball teams. The Japanese team "outclassed" the two other teams.

Games	Year	Host city	Host country	Champion
VI	1923	Osaka	Japan	Japan

== Medals ==
Rank	Nation	Gold	Silver	Bronze	Total
1	China	5	5	0	10
1	Philippines	5	5	0	10
3	Japan (JPN)	0	0	7	7
Totals (3 entries)		10	10	7	27
