= Nine-a-side volleyball at the 1958 Asian Games – Men's tournament =

Men at the 1958 Asian Games
- Venue: Komazawa Outdoor Volleyball Court
- Date: 25–31 May 1958
- Nations: 5

Medalists
gold medal	Japan
silver medal	South Korea
bronze medal	Republic of China

This page presents the results of the Men's 9-man Volleyball Tournament at the 1958 Asian Games, which was held from 25 May to 31 May 1958 in Tokyo, Japan.

== Results ==
Pos	Team	Pld	W	L	Pts	SW	SL	SR
1	Japan	4	4	0	8	12	0	MAX
2	South Korea	4	3	1	7	9	7	1.286
3	Republic of China	4	2	2	6	6	6	1.000
4	Hong Kong	4	1	3	5	5	9	0.556
5	Philippines	4	0	4	4	2	12	0.167

Source: Results

Date		Score		Set 1	Set 2	Set 3	Set 4	Set 5	Total
25 May	Japan	3–0	Philippines	21–15	21–14	21–13			63–42
26 May	Hong Kong	3–0	Philippines	23–21	21–14	21–19			65–54
26 May	Republic of China	0–3	South Korea	16–21	16–21	18–21			50–63
27 May	Japan	3–0	Republic of China	21–16	21–10	21–13			63–39
28 May	South Korea	3–2	Hong Kong						
29 May	Republic of China	3–0	Philippines						
29 May	Japan	3–0	South Korea						
30 May	Republic of China	3–0	Hong Kong	21–13	21–19	21–10			63–42
31 May	South Korea	3–2	Philippines	21–18	22–20	17–21	19–21	21–18	100–98
31 May	Japan	3–0	Hong Kong	21–13	21–14	21–17			63–44

== Final standing ==
Rank	Team	Pld	W	L
1st place, gold medalist(s)	Japan	4	4	0
2nd place, silver medalist(s)	South Korea	4	3	1
3rd place, bronze medalist(s)	Republic of China	4	2	2
4	Hong Kong	4	1	3
5	Philippines	4	0	4
