= Vince Mangulabnan =

Filipino volleyball player (born 1994)

Vincent Mangulabnan
Personal information
- Full name: Vincent Raphael Mangulabnan
- Nickname: Vince
- Nationality: Filipino
- Born: June 3, 1994 (age 32)
- Education: National University (2012–2016)
- Height: 1.73 m (5 ft 8 in)

Volleyball information
- Position: Setter
- Number: 9

Career
- Years: Team
- 2016–2019: Cignal HD Spikers
- 2022: Ateneo Fudgee Barr
- 2023: AMC Cotabato Spikers
- 2023: Ateneo Fudgee Barr
- 2024: Criss Cross King Crunchers

National team
- Years: Team
- 2023: Philippines

Vincent Raphael Mangulabnan (born June 3, 1994) is a Filipino volleyball player and coach. Mangulabnan currently serves as the head coach of the Ateneo Men's Volleyball Team. He played with NU Bulldogs collegiate men's University team. He last played for the Criss Cross King Crunchers in the Spikers' Turf.

== Career ==
=== Collegiate ===
Mangulabnan made his first game appearance with the NU Bulldogs in the UAAP Season 74 where they placed in 6th. He also awarded Rookie of the year on that year.

In UAAP Season 75, they won the first championship of NU Bulldogs in the UAAP volleyball after defeating FEU Tamaraws in the finals.

In UAAP Season 76, they won the second and back-to-back championship of NU Bulldogs in the UAAP volleyball after defeating Ateneo Blue Eagles in the finals.

In UAAP Season 77, they failed to defend their third championship title after being defeated by Ateneo Blue Eagles in the Finals.

In UAAP Season 78, was the last playing year of Mangulabnan. They lost again against Ateneo in a best-of-three finals series.

=== Club ===
Mangulabnan would play for the Cignal HD Spikers in the Spikers' Turf from 2016 until 2019.

He would return to the league as a player for the Ateneo Blue Eagles who are playing as Ateneo Fudgee Barr. He would first join the collegiate squad as a reinforcement at the 2022 Open Conference.

He played for the AMC Cotabato Spikers in the 2022 PNVF Champions League for Men. They finished as runners-up in that tournament.

=== National team ===
Mangulabnan has been part of the Philippine national team. He was captain of the squad that played in the 2023 Southeast Asian Games in Cambodia. He reprised his role as the skipper at the postponed 2022 Asian Games in Hangzhou, China.

== Clubs ==
- (Philippines) Cignal HD Spikers (2016–2019)
- (Philippines) Ateneo Fudgee Barr (2022, 2023)
- (Philippines) AMC Cotabato Spikers (2023)
- (Philippines) Criss Cross King Crunchers (2024–present)

== Awards ==
=== Individual ===
Season	Tournament	Title	Ref
2013-2014	UAAP Season 75	Best Setter	
2015-2016	UAAP Season 77	Best Setter	
2017	2017 PVL Reinforced Conference	Best Setter	
2017	2017 PVL Open Conference	Best Setter	
2019	2019 Spikers' Turf Reinforced Conference	Best Setter	

=== Collegiate ===
Season	Tournament	Title	Ref
2013-2014	UAAP Season 75	Champions	
2014-2015	UAAP Season 76	Champions	
2015-2016	UAAP Season 77	Runner-up	
2016-2017	UAAP Season 78	Runner-up	

=== Clubs ===
Season	Tournament	Club team	Title	Ref
2017	2017 PVL Reinforced Conference	Cignal HD Spikers	Champions	
2017	Premier Volleyball League 1st Season Open Conference	Cignal HD Spikers	Champions	
2018	2018 PVL Reinforced Conference	Cignal HD Spikers	Runners-up	
2018	2018 Spikers' Turf Open Conference	Cignal HD Spikers	3rd place	
2019	2019 Spikers' Turf Reinforced Conference	Cignal HD Spikers	Champions	
2019	2019 Spikers' Turf Open Conference	Cignal HD Spikers	Champions	
2023	2023 Spikers' Turf Open Conference	AMC Cotabato Spikers	Runner-up	
