= Al-Bukharie Sali =

Filipino volleyball player (born 2005)

Personal information
- Nationality: Filipino
- Born: September 23, 2005 (age 21); Tandubas, Tawi-Tawi, Philippines
- Education: UST

Volleyball information
- Position: Opposite hitter

National team
2025–present	Philippines

Al-Bukharie Sali (born September 23, 2005) is a Filipino volleyball player who plays for the UST Golden Spikers.

== Early life ==
Al-Bukharie Sali was born on September 23, 2005, in Tandubas, Tawi-Tawi.

== Career ==
=== Early career ===
Sali was encouraged by his father to take up volleyball. In 2022, Ralph Ocampo scouted Sali. He was playing as a middle blocker for Tawi-Tawi's province day. Ocampo recruited him for the VNS Griffins of the Spikers' Turf. He later played for Mapúa High School in the National Collegiate Athletic Association.

=== Collegiate ===
After graduating from high school, Sali entered the University of Santo Tomas and played for the UST Golden Spikers as a wing spiker in the V-League and the University Athletic Association of the Philippines (UAAP).

The also took part as UST–Gameville Golden Spikers at the 2025 Spikers' Turf Invitational Conference

=== National team ===
In November 2025, Sali was called up to the training pool of the Philippines national team for the 2025 SEA Games in Thailand. He later made his national debut in the regional games' volleyball tournament the following month.
