= Odjie Mamon =

Filipino volleyball coach

Personal information
- Nationality: Filipino
- Born: March 28
- Education: University of Santo Tomas

Coaching information
Previous teams coached
Years	Teams
2011–15; ?–; 2015–2019; 2021–22; 2021; 2022–23; 2023	UST Golden Tigresses; UST Golden Spikers; PLDT (men); Philippines (women); Choco Mucho (AVC); AMC Cotabato Spikers; Philippines (men)
Honours
Women's volleyball
Head coach Philippines
SEA Games
Bronze medal – third place	2001 Kuala Lumpur	Team

Arthur "Odjie" Mamon (born March 28) is a Filipino volleyball coach.

== Career ==
Mamon was a player for the UST Golden Spikers of the UAAP.

== Coaching career ==
=== Collegiate ===
Mamon is a long-time volleyball coach at the University of Santo Tomas. In 2011, Mamon was appointed as head coach of the UST Golden Tigresses of the UAAP. He held the role until 2015 when he resigned citing "excess drama" in handling the women's team.

He later became head coach of the UST Golden Spikers men's team.

=== Club ===
Mamon coached the PLDT men's team at the Spikers' Turf.

The Philippines women's national team competing as the club Choco Mucho finished sixth at the 2021 Asian Women's Club Volleyball Championship under Mamon's tutelage.

Mamon coached the AMC Cotabato Spikers at the 2022 PNVF Champions League for Men. Cotabato later joined the Spikers' Turf where they finished second in the 2023 Open Conference.

=== Philippine national team ===
==== Women's ====
Mamon was head coach of the Philippines women's national team. He led the team to a bronze medal at the 2001 SEA Games in Kuala Lumpur.

In 2021, Mamon was appointed again to the same role in early 2021 expectantly for the 31st SEA Games. Brazilian coach Jorge Edson was brought in as a consltant for Mamon. The two formed the pool for the regional games. Edson eventually was the head coach for the SEA Games in Hanoi.

He was assistant coach of the women's team which also won bronze at the 2003 SEA Games.

==== Men's ====
Mamon was also head coach of the Philippines men's national team. He became interim head coach in January 2023. He served the role until Sérgio Veloso took over.
