= Oliver Almadro =

Filipino volleyball coach

Personal information
- Nationality: Filipino

Coaching information
- Current team: University of the Philippines (women)
- Previous teams coached
- Years: Teams
- –2017 2018–2022 2019–2022 2023 2023: Ateneo de Manila University (men); Ateneo de Manila University (women); Choco Mucho Flying Titans; Petro Gazz Angels; UP Fighting Maroons

Oliver Allan Almadro is a Filipino volleyball coach and is the former head coach of the Choco Mucho Flying Titans in the Premier Volleyball League, the volleyball program director of the UP Fighting Maroons and the head of operations of Petro Gazz Angels.

== Education ==
Almadro attended the Colegio de San Juan de Letran. He attempted to secure a berth in Letran's men's volleyball team was unable to leading him to pursue a career in coaching instead.

== Career ==
Almadro has been the head coach of the Ateneo de Manila University's volleyball teams which played in the University Athletic Association of the Philippines (UAAP). He led the men's team to its first final appearance in three decade in Season 76 in 2014. This was followed by three-straight titles from Season 77 to 79.

In May 2018, he was named as head coach of Ateneo's women's team. At Season 81 (2019), his first UAAP run with the women's side, he led the lady spikers to a title. At Season 84 (2022) however, the team finished as semifinalist.

The Choco Mucho Flying Titans, a team formed in 2019, tapped Almadro as their head coach. The team first competed in the Premier Volleyball League (PVL) in the 2019 Open Conference. Almadro resigned from Choco Mucho in November 2022 to focus on his role as head coach of Ateneo de Manila's women's team.

In January 2023, Almadro joined Petro Gazz Angels as their head coach starting the All-Filipino Conference. In July, he left Ateneo and was replaced by Brazilian coach Sergio Veloso. In August, he was appointed as head of Petro Gazz's volleyball operations.

== Personal life ==
Almadro is a devout Roman Catholic and has three sons and a daughter. He is a devotee of the Black Nazarene.
