= Eco Adajar =

Filipino volleyball player (born 2000)

Personal information
- Nationality: Filipino
- Born: December 29, 2000 (age 25) Lipa, Batangas, Philippines
- Education: Lyceum Laguna; De La Salle University
- Height: 1.82 m (6 ft 0 in)

Volleyball information
- Position: Setter

Career
- Years: Team
- 2023: Santa Rosa City Lions
- 2023: Cabstars–Cabuyao
- 2025–present: Criss Cross King Crunchers

National team
- Years: Team
- 2025–present: Philippines

Jerico "Eco" Adajar (born December 29, 2000) is a Filipino volleyball player.

== Early life and education ==
Jerico "Eco" Adajar was born on December 29, 2000, in Lipa, Batangas. He studied at the Lyceum of the Philippines University – Laguna (LPU–L) where he graduated with a bachelor's degree in civil engineering in 2023. A year later he entered the De La Salle University and pursued a master's degree in entrepreneurship.

== Career ==
=== College ===
Adajar played for the LPU-L varsity volleyball team during his first four years of college. He has been part of his school's volleyball program since Grade 11.

After graduating from LPU-L, Adajar joined the DLSU Green Spikers in May 2024. He played in UAAP Season 86 and UAAP Season 87 with his school having a Final Four finishes in both seasons.

He also helped the team have back-to-back V-League Collegiate Challenge finals appearances. DLSU won the 2023 title and was runners-up of the 2024 edition where Adajar was named Best Setter.

=== Club ===
Adajar has played in the Spikers' Turf. He played for the Santa Rosa City Lions in the 2023 Open Conference as their main setter. He later played for the Cabstars–Cabuyao in the 2023 Invitational Conference as its captain.

In June 2025, Adajar joined the Criss Cross King Crunchers.

=== National team ===
Adajar has played for the Philippine national team. He debuted for the team at the 2025 Alas Pilipinas Invitationals and also played at the 2025 SEA Men's V.League.

Adajar is part of the 14-man roster of the Philippines for the 2025 FIVB Men's Volleyball World Championship which the country will be hosting.
