= Leo Ordiales =

Filipino volleyball player (born 2003)

Personal information
- Full name: Leonardo Priolo Ordiales Jr.
- Nickname: Leo
- Nationality: Filipino
- Born: January 4, 2003 (age 23) Silay, Negros Occidental, Philippines
- Home town: Talisay, Negros Occidental
- Education: National University
- Height: 197 cm (6 ft 6 in)
- Weight: 95 kg (209 lb)

Volleyball information
- Position: Opposite hitter

Career
- Years: Team
- 2023: Sta. Elena–Nationals

National team
- Years: Team
- 2023–present: Philippines

Leonardo Priolo Ordiales Jr. (born January 4, 2003) is a Filipino volleyball player who plays as an opposite hitter for the NU Bulldogs. He also plays for the Philippines men's national volleyball team.

== Early life ==
Leo Priolo Ordiales was born on January 4, 2003, in Barangay 39, Bacolod, Negros Occidental. Ordiales was initially not interested in volleyball, having been convinced by his sister Jessa to take up the sport.

== Career ==
=== High school an college ===
Leo Ordiales plays for the National University (NU) in the University Athletic Association of the Philippines (UAAP). He has played for the high school team, the NU Bullpups winning the boys' trophy in Season 82 (2019). He also was part of the Western Visayas Regional Athletic Association's boys' team in the 2019 Palarong Pambansa.

He remained in NU for college and played for the seniors team, the NU Bulldogs in the UAAP. However it was only in Season 87 (2025) that Ordiales was given a chance to play in the finals after two years. The NU Bulldogs won their fifth consecutive men's championship that season. This the first time that a team accomplished a five-feat in the Final Four era. In Season 88 (2026), NU won their sixth consecutive title. Ordiales was named Best Opposite Hitter and Finals MVP.

=== Club ===
The NU Bulldogs partnering with the Sta. Elena (as the Sta. Elena–Nationals) took part at the 2023 Spikers' Turf Invitational Conference. Ordiales was named as Best Opposite Hitter in the conference won by the Sta. Elena–Nationals.

=== National team ===
Ordiales is part of the Philippine national team. He was part of the squad for the 2023 SEA Games under coach Sergio Veloso.

At the first leg of the 2025 SEA V.League, Ordiales was named as the Best Opposite Spiker. He also played at the 2025 AVC Men's Volleyball Nations Cup in Bahrain.

Since 2024, Ordiales has been part of the national training pool for the 2025 FIVB Men's Volleyball World Championship which the Philippines will be hosting. He made to the final 14-man roster.

== Personal life ==
Talisay, Negros Occidental is Ordiales' hometown. His sister, Jessa Ordiales plays for the De La Salle Lady Spikers.
