= Rex Intal =

Filipino volleyball player (born 1994)

Personal information
- Full name: Rex Emmanuel Intal
- Nationality: Filipino
- Born: September 7, 1994 (age 32)
- Education: Ateneo De Manila University
- Height: 1.91 m (6 ft 3 in)

Volleyball information
- Position: Middle Blocker
- Current club: Criss Cross King Crunchers
- Number: 7

Career
- Years: Team
- 2017–2022: Cignal HD Spikers
- 2023: AMC Cotabato Spikers
- 2024–present: Criss Cross King Crunchers

National team
- Years: Team
- 2019–present: Philippines
Honours
Men's volleyball
Representing Philippines
Southeast Asian Games
Silver medal – second place	2019 Manila	Team

Rex Emmanuel Intal (born September 7, 1994) is a Filipino volleyball athlete. He played with Ateneo Blue Eagles collegiate men's University team. He is currently playing for the Criss Cross King Crunchers in the Spikers' Turf.

== Career ==
Intal played for the Ateneo De Manila University collegiate men's University team where he played as the Middle Blocker of the team.

In 2017, he was signed by the Cignal HD Spikers.

In 2019, he became part of the Philippines men's national volleyball team in the Southeast Asian Games where they finished silver medal.

In 2023, he left Cignal HD Spikers and he was signed by the AMC Cotabato Spikers.

== Clubs ==
- (Philippines) Cignal HD Spikers (2017–2022)
- (Philippines) AMC Cotabato Spikers (2023)
- (Philippines) Criss Cross King Crunchers (2024–present)

== Awards ==
=== Individuals ===
Year	League	Season/Conference	Award	Ref
2018	PVL	Reinforced	1st Best Middle Blocker	

=== Clubs ===
Year	League	Season/Conference	Club	Title	Ref
2017	PVL	Reinforced	Cignal HD Spikers	Champions	
2017	PVL	Open	Cignal HD Spikers	Champions	
2018	PVL	Reinforced	Cignal HD Spikers	Runner-up	
2018	Spikers' Turf	Open	Cignal HD Spikers	3rd place	
2019	Spikers' Turf	Reinforced	Cignal HD Spikers	Champions	
2019	Spikers' Turf	Open	Cignal HD Spikers	Champions	
2022	Spikers' Turf	Open	Cignal HD Spikers	Runner-up	
2022	PNVF	Champions League	AMC Cotabato Spikers	Runner-up	
2023	Spikers' Turf	Open	AMC Cotabato Spikers	Runner-up	
2023	Spikers' Turf	Invitational	AMC Cotabato Spikers	Runner-up	
2024	Spikers' Turf	Open	Criss Cross King Crunchers	Runner-up	
2024	Spikers' Turf	Invitational	Criss Cross King Crunchers	Runner-up	
2025	Spikers' Turf	Open	Criss Cross King Crunchers	Runner-up	
