= Kim Dayandante =

Filipino volleyball player (born 1996)

Personal information
- Full name: Kim Harold Dayandante
- Nationality: Filipino
- Born: December 8, 1996 (age 29)
- Height: 1.80 m (5 ft 11 in)
- Education: University of Santo Tomas; National University

Volleyball information
- Position: Setter
- Current club: Savouge Spin Doctors
- Number: 5

Career
Years	Teams
2017–2019	Megabuilders Volley Bolts / Sta. Elena–NU Ball Hammers
2021	Go for Gold Air Force Aguilas
2022–2023	AMC Cotabato Spikers
2024	D'Navigators Iloilo
2026–present	Savouge Spin Doctors

Kim Harold Dayandante (born December 8, 1996) is a Filipino volleyball player. He played with NU Bulldogs collegiate men's University team. He is currently playing for the Savouge Spin Doctors of the Spikers' Turf .

== Career ==
=== Collegiate ===
Dayandante enrolled in UST before transferring to NU.

In UAAP Season 77, it was his first game appearance as a Bulldogs. They failed to the 3rd championship title for NU after being defeated by Ateneo Blue Eagles in the best of three finals series.

In UAAP Season 78 and UAAP Season 79, they lost again against Ateneo in a best-of-three finals series.

In UAAP Season 80, they got a 12–2 win-lost in the preliminary round tied with FEU Tamaraws. they defeated the Ateneo in the playoffs and semis. NU Bulldogs gets back the championship title after 3 years of Championship drought.

In UAAP Season 81, he was ineligible to play in the UAAP because the UAAP board decided that his first year is with UST.

== Clubs ==
- (Philippines) Megabuilders Volley Bolts (2017)
- (Philippines) Sta. Elena Ball Hammers (2017–2019)
- (Philippines) Go for Gold Air Force Aguilas (2021)
- (Philippines) AMC Cotabato Spikers (2022–2023)
- (Philippines) D'Navigators Iloilo (2024)
- (Philippines) Savouge Spin Doctors (2026–present)

== Awards ==
=== Collegiate ===
Year	League	Season/Conference	Title	Ref
2015	Spikers' Turf	Collegiate	Runner-up	
2016	UAAP	78	Runner-up	
2016	Spikers' Turf	Collegiate	Runner-up	
2017	UAAP	79	Runner-up	
2018	UAAP	80	Champions	
2018	PVL	Collegiate (men's)	Champions	

=== Clubs ===
Year	League	Season/Conference	Club	Title	Ref
2017	PVL	Open	Megabuilders Volley Bolts	Runner-up	
2019	Spikers' Turf	Open	Sta. Elena Ball Hammers	3rd Place	
2021	PNVF	Champions League	Go for Gold-Air Force Aguilas	Runner-up	
2022	PNVF	Champions League	Pikit-North Cotabato G-Spikers	Runner-up	
2023	Spikers' Turf	Open	AMC Cotabato Spikers	Runner-up	
