= AMC Cotabato Spikers =

Volleyball Club

- Founded: 2022
- Head coach: Odjie Mamon
- Captain: Jayvee Sumagaysay
- League: Spikers' Turf
- 2023 Open: 2nd place

The AMC Cotabato Spikers were a men's volleyball team in the Philippines representing Cotabato. The team was established in 2022 as the Pikit North Cotabato AMC G-Spikers, first taking part in the 2022 PNVF Champions League for Men. The following year, the team entered Spikers' Turf and took part in the 2023 Open Conference, their only conference in the league.

== History ==
The AMC Cotabato Spikers debuted as the Pikit North Cotabato AMC G-Spikers at the 2022 PNVF Champions League for Men where they finished second.

In 2023, they debuted in Spikers' Turf as AMC Cotabato Spikers where they finished second place.

== Final roster ==
AMC Cotabato Spikers
Number	Player	Position	Height	Birth date	School
1	(Philippines) Vince Patrick Lorenzo	Libero	1.74 m (5 ft 9 in)		Far Eastern University
2	(Philippines) Manuel Medina	Outside hitter	1.87 m (6 ft 2 in)		University of Santo Tomas
3	(Philippines) Arnold Bautista	Outside Hitter			University of Santo Tomas
6	(Philippines) Rex Emmanuel Intal	Middle blocker	1.90 m (6 ft 3 in)		Ateneo De Manila University
7	(Philippines) Jayvee Sumagaysay (c)	Middle blocker	1.88 m (6 ft 2 in)		University of Santo Tomas
8	(Philippines) (United States) Steve Rotter	Opposite hitter			California State University, Northridge
9	(Philippines) Kim Harold Dayandante	Setter			
10	(Philippines) John Vic De Guzman	Opposite hitter	1.88 m (6 ft 2 in)		De La Salle College of Saint Benilde
11	(Philippines) Joshua Umandal	Outside hitter	1.88 m (6 ft 2 in)		University of Santo Tomas
12	(Philippines) Edward Camposano	Outside hitter	1.91 m (6 ft 3 in)		National University
13	(Philippines) Kris Silang	Setter			
15	(Philippines) Fauzi Kasim Ismail	Outside hitter			
17	(Philippines) Madzlan Gampong	Opposite hitter			National University
18	(Philippines) Jelex Mendiola	Libero			
20	(Philippines) Lloyd Josafat	Middle blocker			

== Honors ==
=== Spikers' Turf ===
Year	Tournament	Placement	Ref
2023	Open	Runner-up	

=== PNVF Champions League ===
Year	Placement	Ref
2022	Runner-up	

=== Individual ===
Season	Conference/Tournament	Award	Name	Source
2022	PNVF Champions League	1st Best Outside Spiker	Joshua Umandal	
2022	PNVF Champions League	2nd Best Middle Blocker	Kim Niño Malabunga	
2023	Spikers' Turf Open Conference	Most Valuable Player (Conference)	Joshua Umandal	

== Team captains ==
- (Philippines) Jayvee Sumagaysay (2022–2023)

== Coaches ==
- (Philippines) Odjie Mamon (2022–2023)

== Former players ==
Local players

Philippines

- Kim Malabunga
