= Vietnam men's national volleyball team =

National sports team

Vietnam
- Association: Volleyball Federation of Vietnam (VFV)
- Confederation: AVC
- Head coach: (Italy) Federico Rampazzo
- FIVB ranking: 58 (1 October 2026)

Uniforms
Home	Away	Third

Asian Championship
- Appearances: 4 (First in 2005)
- Best result: 10th (2017)
- http://www.vfv.org.vn/
Honours
Southeast Asian Games
Silver medal – second place	2007 Nakhon Ratchasima	Team
Silver medal – second place	2015 Singapore	Team
Silver medal – second place	2021 Quảng Ninh	Team
Bronze medal – third place	2005 Bacolod	Team
Bronze medal – third place	2011 Palembang	Team
Bronze medal – third place	2013 Naypyidaw	Team
Bronze medal – third place	2017 Kuala Lumpur	Team
Bronze medal – third place	2023 Phnom Penh	Team
SEA V Cup
Gold medal – first place	2026 Jakarta	Team
Silver medal – second place	2023 Santa Rosa	Team
Silver medal – second place	2025 Jakarta	Team
Bronze medal – third place	2023 Bogor	Team
Bronze medal – third place	2025 Candon	Team

The Vietnam men's national volleyball team (Vietnamese: Đội tuyển bóng chuyền nam quốc gia Việt Nam) is the volleyball national team of Vietnam, representing Vietnam in international volleyball competitions and friendly matches.

== Competition record ==
=== Medals ===
Event	Gold	Silver	Bronze	Total
Asian Championship	0	0	0	0
Asian Cup	0	0	0	0
Asian Nations Cup	0	0	0	0
Asian Games	0	0	0	0
SEA Games	0	3	5	8
SEA V Cup	1	2	2	5
Lien Viet Post Bank Volleyball	0	0	1	1
Total	1	5	8	14

=== World Championship ===
- (Poland) 2014 — Did not qualify
- (Italy) (Bulgaria) 2018 — Did not qualify
- (Poland) (Slovenia) 2022 — Did not qualify
- (Philippines) 2025 — Did not qualify

=== Asian Championship ===
Champions Runners up Third place Fourth place

Asian Championship record
Year	Round	Position	Pld	W	L	SW	SL
(Australia) 1975	Did not participate						
(Bahrain) 1979	Did not participate						
(Japan) 1983	Did not participate						
(Kuwait) 1987	Did not participate						
(South Korea) 1989	Did not participate						
(Australia) 1991	Did not participate						
(Thailand) 1993	Did not participate						
(South Korea) 1995	Did not participate						
(Qatar) 1997	Did not participate						
(Iran) 1999	Did not participate						
(South Korea) 2001	Did not participate						
(China) 2003	Did not participate						
(Thailand) 2005	11th place match	12th place	8	3	5	16	15
(Indonesia) 2007	13th–16th place	15th place	9	2	7	16	21
(Philippines) 2009	11th place match	12th place	9	4	5	13	15
(Iran) 2011	Did not participate						
(United Arab Emirates) 2013	Did not participate						
(Iran) 2015	Did not participate						
(Indonesia) 2017	9th place match	10th place	8	4	4	14	19
(Iran) 2019	Did not participate						
(Japan) 2021	Did not participate						
(Iran) 2023	Did not participate						
(Japan) 2026	Did not participate						
Total	0 Titles	4/23	34	13	21	59	70

=== Asian Games ===
Champions Runners up Third place Fourth place

Asian Games record
Year	Round	Position	Pld	W	L	SW	SL
(Japan) 1958	Did not participate						
(Indonesia) 1962	Did not participate						
(Thailand) 1966	7th–12th match	10th place	8	2	6	9	20
(Thailand) 1970	Did not participate						
(Iran) 1974	Did not participate						
(Thailand) 1978	Did not participate						
(India) 1982	Did not participate						
(South Korea) 1986	Did not participate						
(China) 1990	7th place match	7th place	5	2	3	6	10
(Japan) 1994	Did not participate						
(Thailand) 1998	Did not participate						
(South Korea) 2002	Did not participate						
(Qatar) 2006	Did not participate						
(China) 2010	15th place match	16th place	7	0	7	7	24
(South Korea) 2014	Did not participate						
(Indonesia) 2018	13th place match	14th place	6	3	3	10	12
(China) 2022	Did not participate						
(Japan) 2026	9th place match	10th place	6	3	3	10	11
Total	0 Titles	5/18	32	10	22	42	77

=== Asian Nations Cup ===
Champions Runners up Third place Fourth place

Asian Nations Cup record
Year	Round	Position	GP	MW	ML	SW	SL	Squad
(Sri Lanka) 2018	Did not participate							
(Kyrgyzstan) 2022	Did not participate							
(Taiwan) 2023	Semifinals	4th place	4	1	3	6	10	Squad
(Bahrain) 2024	5th–8th places	6th place	5	2	3	9	10	Squad
(Bahrain) 2025	5th–8th places	8th place	5	1	4	8	12	Squad
(India) 2026	Did not participate							
Total	0 Titles	3/6	14	4	10	23	32	—

=== Asian Cup ===
Champions Runners up Third place Fourth place

Asian Cup record (Defunct)
Year	Round	Position	Pld	W	L	SW	SL
(Thailand) 2008	Did not qualify						
(Iran) 2010	Did not qualify						
(Vietnam) 2012	5th place match	6th place	6	2	4	6	13
(Kazakhstan) 2014	Did not qualify						
(Thailand) 2016	Did not qualify						
(Taiwan) 2018	5th–9th match	9th place	4	0	4	4	12
(Thailand) 2022	Did not qualify						
Total	0 Titles	2/7	10	2	8	10	25

=== SEA Games ===
Champions Runners up Third place Fourth place

SEA Games record
Year	Round	Position	GP	MW	ML	SW	SL	Squad
(Malaysia) 1977	Did not participate							
(Indonesia) 1979	Did not participate							
(Philippines) 1981	Did not participate							
(Singapore) 1983	Did not participate							
(Thailand) 1985	Did not participate							
(Indonesia) 1987	Did not participate							
(Malaysia) 1989		?						
(Philippines) 1991		?						
(Singapore) 1993		?						
(Thailand) 1995		?						
(Indonesia) 1997		?						
(Brunei) 1999	Not held							
(Malaysia) 2001	Round robin	5th place						Squad
(Vietnam) 2003	Semifinals	4th place	4	1	3	9	9	Squad
(Philippines) 2005	Semifinals	3rd place						Squad
(Thailand) 2007	Final	Runners-up						Squad
(Laos) 2009	Semifinals	4th place	4	1	3	4	10	Squad
(Indonesia) 2011	Semifinals	3rd place	5	3	2	11	8	Squad
(Myanmar) 2013	Semifinals	3rd place	4	2	2	8	6	Squad
(Singapore) 2015	Final	Runners-up	5	4	1	12	3	Squad
(Malaysia) 2017	Semifinals	3rd place	5	3	2	11	6	Squad
(Philippines) 2019	5th place match	5th place	5	2	3	8	9	Squad
(Vietnam) 2021	Final	Runners-up	5	3	2	10	8	Squad
(Cambodia) 2023	Semifinals	3rd place	5	3	2	10	6	Squad
(Thailand) 2025	Semifinals	4th place	5	2	3	10	9	Squad
Total	0 Titles	18/24	47	24	23	93	74	—

=== SEA V Cup ===
Champions Runners up Third place Fourth place

SEA V Cup record
Year	Round	Position	GP	MW	ML	SW	SL
(Indonesia) (Philippines) 2023	Round robin	3rd place	3	1	2	3	8
(Indonesia) (Philippines) 2023	Round robin	Runners-up	3	2	1	7	7
(Philippines) (Indonesia) 2024	Round robin	4th place	3	0	3	3	9
(Philippines) (Indonesia) 2024	Round robin	4th place	3	0	3	4	9
(Philippines) (Indonesia) 2025	Round robin	3rd place	4	2	2	8	7
(Philippines) (Indonesia) 2025	Round robin	Runners-up	4	3	1	10	6
(Philippines) (Indonesia) 2026	Semifinals	4th place	4	1	3	5	9
(Philippines) (Indonesia) 2026	Final	Champions	4	3	1	11	6
Total	1 Title	8/8	28	12	16	51	61

=== Lien Viet Post Bank Volleyball Cup ===
- (Vietnam) 2018 — 3rd place
- (Vietnam) 2019

== Results and fixtures ==
=== 2026 ===
==== 2026 SEA V Cup ====
15 July 2026; 14:00 (UTC+08:00)	Thailand	3–1	Vietnam	Candon City Arena, Candon, Philippines
15 July 2026; 14:00 (UTC+08:00)	(33–31, 18–25, 25–19, 25–16)			Candon City Arena, Candon, Philippines

17 July 2026; 14:00 (UTC+08:00)	Myanmar	0–3	Vietnam	Candon City Arena, Candon, Philippines
17 July 2026; 14:00 (UTC+08:00)	(18–25, 23–25, 19–25)			Candon City Arena, Candon, Philippines

18 July 2026; 20:00 (UTC+08:00)	Indonesia	3–0	Vietnam	Candon City Arena, Candon, Philippines
18 July 2026; 20:00 (UTC+08:00)	(25–22, 25–20, 25–22)			Candon City Arena, Candon, Philippines

19 July 2026; 14:00 (UTC+08:00)	Vietnam	1–3	Thailand	Candon City Arena, Candon, Philippines
19 July 2026; 14:00 (UTC+08:00)	(25–23, 28–30, 20–25, 26–28)			Candon City Arena, Candon, Philippines

23 July 2026; 15:30 (UTC+07:00)	Thailand	3–2	Vietnam	Jakarta International Velodrome, Jakarta, Indonesia
23 July 2026; 15:30 (UTC+07:00)	(23–25, 15–25, 25–18, 25–21, 15–12)			Jakarta International Velodrome, Jakarta, Indonesia

24 July 2026; 15:30 (UTC+07:00)	Myanmar	0–3	Vietnam	Jakarta International Velodrome, Jakarta, Indonesia
24 July 2026; 15:30 (UTC+07:00)	(19–25, 23–25, 22–25)			Jakarta International Velodrome, Jakarta, Indonesia

25 July 2026; 19:00 (UTC+07:00)	Indonesia	1–3	Vietnam	Jakarta International Velodrome, Jakarta, Indonesia
25 July 2026; 19:00 (UTC+07:00)	(25–22, 22–25, 19–25, 18–25)			Jakarta International Velodrome, Jakarta, Indonesia

26 July 2026; 19:00 (UTC+07:00)	Vietnam	3–2	Thailand	Jakarta International Velodrome, Jakarta, Indonesia
26 July 2026; 19:00 (UTC+07:00)	(22–25, 25–23, 25–19, 15–25, 15–10)			Jakarta International Velodrome, Jakarta, Indonesia

== Team ==
=== Current squad ===
- Head coach: (Italy) Federico Rampazzo
- Assistant coaches:
  - (Vietnam) Nguyễn Đình Lập
  - (Vietnam) Lê Quang Khánh
  - (Vietnam) Phan Văn Nghiệp
- Language assistant: (Vietnam) Nguyễn Phan Thái Linh

The following list consists of 17 players who are called for 2026 SEA V Cup:

No.	Pos.	Name	Date of birth	Height	Weight	Spike	Block	Club
1	S	Đinh Văn Duy	25 August 2000	1.84 m (6 ft 0 in)	74 kg (163 lb)	330 cm (130 in)	310 cm (120 in)	(Vietnam) Biên Phòng MB
2	L	Trịnh Duy Phúc (c)	27 May 1999	1.82 m (6 ft 0 in)	76 kg (168 lb)	320 cm (130 in)	300 cm (120 in)	(Vietnam) LP Bank Ninh Bình
3	OH	Dương Văn Tiên	23 September 1996	1.90 m (6 ft 3 in)	80 kg (180 lb)	335 cm (132 in)	320 cm (130 in)	(Vietnam) Ho Chi Minh City Police
4	OH	Trần Minh Đức	10 May 2002	1.90 m (6 ft 3 in)	82 kg (181 lb)	330 cm (130 in)	320 cm (130 in)	(Vietnam) Biên Phòng MB
6	OP	Lý Văn Chường	1 July 2001	1.92 m (6 ft 4 in)	80 kg (180 lb)	340 cm (130 in)	325 cm (128 in)	(Vietnam) Hà Nội
7	OH	Tăng Ngọc Hiếu	2 June 2006	1.90 m (6 ft 3 in)	71 kg (157 lb)	328 cm (129 in)	315 cm (124 in)	(Vietnam) Sanest Khánh Hòa
8	MB	Trần Duy Tuyến	3 June 2001	1.90 m (6 ft 3 in)	70 kg (150 lb)	340 cm (130 in)	320 cm (130 in)	(Vietnam) Biên Phòng MB
11	MB	Trương Thế Khải	9 October 2004	2.00 m (6 ft 7 in)	95 kg (209 lb)	345 cm (136 in)	335 cm (132 in)	(Vietnam) Biên Phòng MB
12	MB	Phạm Thanh Tùng	2 February 2001	2.00 m (6 ft 7 in)	80 kg (180 lb)	355 cm (140 in)	345 cm (136 in)	(Vietnam) Thể Công Tân Cảng
13	S	Phan Công Đức	22 May 2003	1.85 m (6 ft 1 in)	83 kg (183 lb)	332 cm (131 in)	320 cm (130 in)	(Vietnam) Thể Công Tân Cảng
14	OH	Trần Anh Tú	4 July 1995	1.84 m (6 ft 0 in)	74 kg (163 lb)	330 cm (130 in)	320 cm (130 in)	(Vietnam) LP Bank Ninh Bình
16	OP	Đinh Văn Phương	18 May 2002	1.96 m (6 ft 5 in)	83 kg (183 lb)	360 cm (140 in)	330 cm (130 in)	(Vietnam) Hà Tĩnh
17	OH	Nguyễn Ngọc Thuân	17 May 1999	1.93 m (6 ft 4 in)	81 kg (179 lb)	350 cm (140 in)	330 cm (130 in)	(Vietnam) Biên Phòng MB
18	OP	Phạm Quốc Dư	10 October 1996	1.92 m (6 ft 4 in)	82 kg (181 lb)	345 cm (136 in)	340 cm (130 in)	(Vietnam) Ho Chi Minh City Police
22	S	Trần Hoài Phương	7 April 1994	1.87 m (6 ft 2 in)	83 kg (183 lb)	330 cm (130 in)	320 cm (130 in)	(Vietnam) Ho Chi Minh City Police
23	L	Cao Đức Hoàng	26 November 1998	1.74 m (5 ft 9 in)	71 kg (157 lb)	305 cm (120 in)	295 cm (116 in)	(Vietnam) Thể Công Tân Cảng
25	MB	Bùi Xuân Tiến	24 February 2001	1.95 m (6 ft 5 in)	85 kg (187 lb)	350 cm (140 in)	330 cm (130 in)	(Vietnam) Ho Chi Minh City Police

Notes:

- ^{OP} Opposite Spiker
- ^{OH} Outside Hitter
- ^{MB} Middle Blocker
- ^{S} Setter
- ^{L} Libero

== See also ==
- Vietnam women's national volleyball team
- Volleyball Vietnam League
