= Thailand men's national volleyball team =

Men's national volleyball team representing Thailand

Thailand
- Nickname(s): ลูกยางหนุ่มไทย
- Association: Thailand Volleyball Association (TVA)
- Confederation: AVC
- Head coach: Park Ki-won
- FIVB ranking: 52 ▲7 (1 October 2026)

Uniforms
Home	Away	Third

World Championship
- Appearances: 1 (First in 1998)
- Best result: 19th (1998)

Asian Championship
- Appearances: 16 (First in 1987)
- Best result: 5th (2005, 2026)
- http://www.volleyball.or.th/
Honours
Event	1st	2nd	3rd
AVC Cup	1	0	0
SEA Games	9	5	5
SEA V Cup	3	2	3
Wenchang Volleyball Festival	3	0	0
Total	16	7	8
AVC Cup
Gold medal – first place	2023 Taipei	Team
SEA Games
Gold medal – first place	1985 Bangkok	Team
Gold medal – first place	1995 Chiang Mai	Team
Gold medal – first place	2001 Kuala Lumpur	Team
Gold medal – first place	2005 Bacolod	Team
Gold medal – first place	2011 Palembang	Team
Gold medal – first place	2013 Naypyidaw	Team
Gold medal – first place	2015 Singapore	Team
Gold medal – first place	2017 Kuala Lumpur	Team
Gold medal – first place	2025 Bangkok	Team
Silver medal – second place	1991 Manila	Team
Silver medal – second place	1993 Singapore	Team
Silver medal – second place	1997 Jakarta	Team
Silver medal – second place	2003 Ninh Bình	Team
Silver medal – second place	2009 Vientiane	Team
Bronze medal – third place	1977 Kuala Lumpur	Team
Bronze medal – third place	1987 Jakarta	Team
Bronze medal – third place	1989 Kuala Lumpur	Team
Bronze medal – third place	2007 Nakhon Ratchasima	Team
Bronze medal – third place	2019 Pasig	Team
SEA V Cup
Gold medal – first place	2024 Manila / Yogyakarta	Team
Gold medal – first place	2025 Candon	Team
Silver medal – second place	2023 Bogor	Team
Silver medal – second place	2026 Jakarta	Team
Bronze medal – third place	2023 Santa Rosa	Team
Bronze medal – third place	2025 Jakarta	Team
Bronze medal – third place	2026 Candon	Team
Wenchang Volleyball Festival
Gold medal – first place	2024 Wenchang	Team
Gold medal – first place	2025 Wenchang	Team
Gold medal – first place	2026 Wenchang	Team

The Thailand men's national volleyball team (Thai: วอลเลย์บอลชายทีมชาติไทย) represents Thailand in international volleyball competitions and friendly matches, governed by Thailand Volleyball Association.

The team won a gold medal in the 2023 AVC Men's Challenge Cup at the Taipei, Taiwan and represent AVC at the 2023 FIVB Men's Volleyball Challenger Cup for finding one team to qualify for the 2024 VNL. The tournament was held at Aspire Ladies Sports Hall in Doha, Qatar, between 28 and 30 July 2023.

== History ==
Volleyball had spread into Thailand since before 1900s. In the past, volleyball was a popular sport among the Chinese and Vietnamese. Until there was competition between the clubs and community associations, sometimes contacted to compete in the Northern region, Northeastern region and The Gold Cup volleyball tournament in the Southern Region.

Since 1934 the Ministry of Education published rules of volleyball by Noppakun Pongsuwan. He was an expert person on sports, especially volleyball. He invited a lecture on how to play, the rules of volleyball to physical education teachers. After that, Department of Physical Education had provide an annual girls' volleyball tournament. For the first time, Department of Physical Education had set course of the central physical education school for girls' student to studied Volleyball and Netball.

In 1957, Nawa Akat Ek Luang Supachalasai, Director of the Department of Physical Education had been established the "Amateur Volleyball Association of Thailand" (Thai: สมาคมวอลเลย์บอลสมัครเล่นแห่งประเทศไทย), with the aim to supported and publicized the progress volleyball and managed a 6 players volleyball tournament and the annual volleyball competition in other government office, such as the Department of Physical Education, University Sports Committee, Bangkok Municipality, Military Sports Council, as well as the Thailand National Games volleyball tournament in women's and men's volleyball.

== Medals ==
Event	Gold	Silver	Bronze	Total
World Championship	0	0	0	0
Asian Championship	0	0	0	0
Asian Games	0	0	0	0
Asian Cup	0	0	0	0
AVC Cup	1	0	0	1
SEA Games	9	5	5	19
SEA V Cup	3	2	3	8
Wenchang Volleyball Festival	3	0	0	3
Total	16	7	8	31

== Competition record ==
=== World Championship ===
Champions Runners up Third place Fourth place

World Championship record
Year	Round	Position	GP	MW	ML	SW	SL	Squad
(Czech Republic) 1949	Did not enter							
(Soviet Union) 1952	Did not enter							
(France) 1956	Did not enter							
(Brazil) 1960	Did not enter							
(Soviet Union) 1962	Did not enter							
(Czech Republic) 1966	Did not qualify							
(Bulgaria) 1970	Did not qualify							
(Mexico) 1974	Did not qualify							
(Italy) 1978	Did not qualify							
(Argentina) 1982	Did not qualify							
(France) 1986	Did not qualify							
(Brazil) 1990	Did not qualify							
(Greece) 1994	Did not qualify							
(Japan) 1998	Preliminary round	19th	3	0	3	0	9	Squad
(Argentina) 2002	Did not qualify							
(Japan) 2006	Did not qualify							
(Italy) 2010	Did not qualify							
(Poland) 2014	Did not qualify							
(Italy) (Bulgaria) 2018	Did not qualify							
(Poland) (Slovenia) 2022	Did not qualify							
(Philippines) 2025	Did not qualify							
(Poland) 2027	To be determined							
(Qatar) 2029	To be determined							
Total	1/21	0 Titles	3	0	3	0	9	—

=== Challenger Cup ===
Champions Runners up Third place Fourth place

Challenger Cup record (Defunct)
Year	Round	Position	GP	MW	ML	SW	SL	Squad
(Portugal) 2018	Did not qualify							
(Slovenia) 2019	Did not enter							
(South Korea) 2022	Did not enter							
(Qatar) 2023	Quarterfinals	7th	1	0	1	0	3	Squad
(China) 2024	Did not qualify							
Total	1/5		1	0	1	0	3	—

=== AVC Continental Championship ===
Champions Runners up Third place Fourth place

AVC Continental Championship record
Year	Round	Position	Pld	W	L	SW	SL
(Australia) 1975	Did not participate						
(Hong Kong) 1979	Did not participate						
(Japan) 1983	Did not participate						
(Kuwait) 1987	13th–16th plces	14th					
(South Korea) 1989	13th–16th place	15th					
(Australia) 1991	9th–12th places	9th					
(Thailand) 1993	5th–8th places	7th					
(South Korea) 1995	5th–8th places	7th					
(Qatar) 1997	9th–12th places	11th					
(Iran) 1999	Did not participate						
(South Korea) 2001	Did not participate						
(China) 2003	9th–12th places	10th	7	4	3	13	13
(Thailand) 2005	5th–8th places	5th	5	3	2	10	9
(Indonesia) 2007	Championship round	6th	6	3	3	5	12
(Philippines) 2009	13th–16th places	13th	7	3	4	10	13
(Iran) 2011	9th–12th places	10th	7	3	4	11	13
(Kuwait) 2013	5th–8th places	6th	6	5	1	15	6
(Iran) 2015	5th–8th places	8th	8	2	6	8	22
(Indonesia) 2017	9th–12th places	11th	7	4	3	16	12
(Iran) 2019	9th–12th places	11th	7	4	3	15	14
(Japan) 2021	13th–16th places	15th	7	2	5	12	17
(Iran) 2023	9th place match	10th	6	2	4	8	13
(Japan) 2026	Quarterfinals	5th	4	3	1	9	7
Total	0 Titles	18/23	0	0	0	0	0

=== Asian Games ===
Champions Runners up Third place Fourth place

Asian Games record
Year	Round	Position	GP	MW	ML	SW	SL	Squad
(Japan) 1958	Did not participate							
(Indonesia) 1962	Did not participate							
(Thailand) 1966	Final round	6th						Squad
(Thailand) 1970	Round robin	8th						Squad
(Iran) 1974	Did not participate							
(Thailand) 1978	Classification 7th–12th	11th						Squad
(India) 1982	Did not participate							
(South Korea) 1986	Classification 9th–12th	9th						Squad
(China) 1990	Did not participate							
(Japan) 1994	Did not participate							
(Thailand) 1998	Classification 5th–8th	5th	6	4	2	12	8	Squad
(South Korea) 2002	Did not participate							
(Qatar) 2006	Preliminary round	11th	4	2	2	7	6	Squad
(China) 2010	Semifinals	4th	8	4	4	13	18	Squad
(South Korea) 2014	Classification 5th–8th	7th	8	4	4	14	13	Squad
(Indonesia) 2018	Classification 7th–12th	7th	7	5	2	19	10	Squad
(China) 2022	Classification 7th–10th	10th	5	1	4	5	8	Squad
(Japan) 2026	Classification 5th–8th	5th	6	4	2	12	11	Squad
Total	0 Titles	11/18	0	0	0	0	0	—

=== AVC Cup ===
Champions Runners up Third place Fourth place

AVC Cup record
Year	Round	Position	GP	MW	ML	SW	SL	Squad
(Sri Lanka) 2018	Did not enter							
(Kyrgyzstan) 2022	Did not enter							
(Taiwan) 2023	Final	1st	6	5	1	15	7	Squad
(Bahrain) 2024	9th–12th places	9th	4	2	2	8	7	Squad
(Bahrain) 2025	9th–11th places	9th	4	2	2	9	6	Squad
(India) 2026	5th place match	6th	5	2	3	9	12	Squad
Total	1 Title	4/6	19	11	8	41	32	—

=== Asian Cup ===
Champions Runners up Third place Fourth place

Asian Cup record (Defunct)
Year	Round	Position	Pld	W	L	SW	SL
(Thailand) 2008		6th	6	1	5	3	16
(Iran) 2010	Did not qualify						
(Vietnam) 2012	Did not qualify						
(Kazakhstan) 2014		8th	6	1	5	9	15
(Thailand) 2016		7th	6	1	5	8	15
(Taiwan) 2018		5th	6	4	2	14	13
(Thailand) 2022		7th	6	3	3	11	12
Total	0 Titles	5/7	30	10	20	45	71

=== SEA Games ===
Champions Runners up Third place Fourth place

SEA Games record
Year	Round	Position	Pld	W	L	SW	SL
(Malaysia) 1977	Semifinals	3rd					
(Indonesia) 1979		?					
(Philippines) 1981		?					
(Singapore) 1983		5th	4	2	2	8	6
(Thailand) 1985	Final	1st					
(Indonesia) 1987	Semifinals	3rd					
(Malaysia) 1989	Semifinals	3rd					
(Philippines) 1991	Final	2nd					
(Singapore) 1993	Final	2nd					
(Thailand) 1995	Final	1st					
(Indonesia) 1997	Final	2nd					
(Brunei) 1999	Not held						
(Malaysia) 2001	Final	1st					
(Vietnam) 2003	Final	2nd	5	4	1	12	7
(Philippines) 2005	Final	1st	5	5	0	15	5
(Thailand) 2007	Semifinals	3rd	5	3	2	11	7
(Laos) 2009	Final	2nd	4	3	1	11	4
(Indonesia) 2011	Final	1st	5	5	0	15	2
(Myanmar) 2013	Final	1st	5	5	0	15	0
(Singapore) 2015	Final	1st	5	5	0	15	1
(Malaysia) 2017	Final	1st	5	5	0	15	3
(Philippines) 2019	Semifinals	3rd	4	3	1	11	4
(Vietnam) 2021	Semifinals	4th	4	2	2	10	8
(Cambodia) 2023	Semifinals	4th	5	3	2	11	7
(Thailand) 2025	Final	1st	5	5	0	15	3
Total	9 Titles	24/24	61	50	11	164	57

=== SEA V Cup ===
Champions Runners up Third place Fourth place

SEA V Cup record
Year	Round	Position	GP	MW	ML	SW	SL
(Indonesia) (Philippines) 2023	Round robin	2nd	3	2	1	6	3
(Indonesia) (Philippines) 2023	Round robin	3rd	3	1	2	7	8
(Philippines) (Indonesia) 2024	Round robin	1st	3	3	0	9	0
(Philippines) (Indonesia) 2024	Round robin	1st	3	3	0	9	1
(Philippines) (Indonesia) 2025	Round robin	1st	4	3	1	10	4
(Philippines) (Indonesia) 2025	Round robin	3rd	4	2	2	10	9
(Philippines) (Indonesia) 2026	Semifinals	3rd	4	3	1	10	5
(Philippines) (Indonesia) 2026	Final	2nd	4	3	1	11	5
Total	3 Titles	8/8	28	20	8	72	35

== Results and fixtures ==
=== 2026 ===
==== 2026 AVC Cup ====
20 June 2026; 18:30 (UTC+05:30)	South Korea	2–3	Thailand	Veer Savarkar Sports Complex, Ahmedabad, India; Referees: Jaek Passier (AUS), Ahmed Ali Hasan (BHR)
20 June 2026; 18:30 (UTC+05:30)	(17–25, 26–24, 25–21, 18–25, 7–15); Report			Veer Savarkar Sports Complex, Ahmedabad, India; Referees: Jaek Passier (AUS), Ahmed Ali Hasan (BHR)

21 June 2026; 15:00 (UTC+05:30)	Qatar	3–0	Thailand	Veer Savarkar Sports Complex, Ahmedabad, India; Attendance: 500; Referees: Lee Kwang-hun (KOR), Jaek Passier (AUS)
21 June 2026; 15:00 (UTC+05:30)	(25–23, 25–23, 25–17); Report			Veer Savarkar Sports Complex, Ahmedabad, India; Attendance: 500; Referees: Lee Kwang-hun (KOR), Jaek Passier (AUS)

22 June 2026; 15:00 (UTC+05:30)	Oman	1–3	Thailand	Veer Savarkar Sports Complex, Ahmedabad, India; Attendance: 1,200; Referees: Agung Purwantoro (INA), Mary Kerekere (NZL)
22 June 2026; 15:00 (UTC+05:30)	(25–17, 15–25, 18–25, 20–25); Report			Veer Savarkar Sports Complex, Ahmedabad, India; Attendance: 1,200; Referees: Agung Purwantoro (INA), Mary Kerekere (NZL)

23 June 2026; 18:00 (UTC+05:30)	Indonesia	3–2	Thailand	Veer Savarkar Sports Complex, Ahmedabad, India; Attendance: 550; Referees: Fahad Mohammed I A Alawadhi (QAT), Jaek Passier (AUS)
23 June 2026; 18:00 (UTC+05:30)	(19–25, 25–19, 25–22, 23–25, 15–12); Report			Veer Savarkar Sports Complex, Ahmedabad, India; Attendance: 550; Referees: Fahad Mohammed I A Alawadhi (QAT), Jaek Passier (AUS)

28 June 2026; 12:30 (UTC+05:30)	Kazakhstan	3–1	Thailand	Veer Savarkar Sports Complex, Ahmedabad, India; Attendance: 1,000; Referees: Ahmed Ali Hasan (BHR), Sulaiman Al Moqbali (OMA)
28 June 2026; 12:30 (UTC+05:30)	(25–21, 25–23, 22–25, 27–25); Report			Veer Savarkar Sports Complex, Ahmedabad, India; Attendance: 1,000; Referees: Ahmed Ali Hasan (BHR), Sulaiman Al Moqbali (OMA)

==== 2026 SEA V Cup ====
15 July 2026; 14:00 (UTC+08:00)	Thailand	3–1	Vietnam	Candon City Arena, Candon, Philippines
15 July 2026; 14:00 (UTC+08:00)	(33–31, 18–25, 25–19, 25–16)			Candon City Arena, Candon, Philippines

16 July 2026; 14:00 (UTC+08:00)	Thailand	3–0	Myanmar	Candon City Arena, Candon, Philippines
16 July 2026; 14:00 (UTC+08:00)	(25–15, 25–16, 25–19)			Candon City Arena, Candon, Philippines

18 July 2026; 16:00 (UTC+08:00)	Thailand	1–3	Cambodia	Candon City Arena, Candon, Philippines
18 July 2026; 16:00 (UTC+08:00)	(21–25, 25–16, 23–25, 17–25)			Candon City Arena, Candon, Philippines

19 July 2026; 14:00 (UTC+08:00)	Vietnam	1–3	Thailand	Candon City Arena, Candon, Philippines
19 July 2026; 14:00 (UTC+08:00)	(25–23, 28–30, 20–25, 26–28)			Candon City Arena, Candon, Philippines

22 July 2026; 15:30 (UTC+07:00)	Thailand	3–0	Myanmar	Jakarta International Velodrome, Jakarta, Indonesia
22 July 2026; 15:30 (UTC+07:00)	(25–20, 25–9, 25–18)			Jakarta International Velodrome, Jakarta, Indonesia

23 July 2026; 15:30 (UTC+07:00)	Thailand	3–2	Vietnam	Jakarta International Velodrome, Jakarta, Indonesia
23 July 2026; 15:30 (UTC+07:00)	(23–25, 15–25, 25–18, 25–21, 15–12)			Jakarta International Velodrome, Jakarta, Indonesia

25 July 2026; 15:30 (UTC+07:00)	Thailand	3–0	Cambodia	Jakarta International Velodrome, Jakarta, Indonesia
25 July 2026; 15:30 (UTC+07:00)	(25–18, 25–19, 25–18)			Jakarta International Velodrome, Jakarta, Indonesia

26 July 2026; 19:00 (UTC+07:00)	Vietnam	3–2	Thailand	Jakarta International Velodrome, Jakarta, Indonesia
26 July 2026; 19:00 (UTC+07:00)	(22–25, 25–23, 25–19, 15–25, 15–10)			Jakarta International Velodrome, Jakarta, Indonesia

==== 2026 AVC Men's Volleyball Continental Championship ====
5 September 2026; 17:00 (UTC+09:00)	Qatar	0–3	Thailand	Kitakyushu City General Gymnasium, Kitakyushu, Japan; Attendance: 1,725; Referees: Ismail Ibrahim Alblooshi (UAE), Robert Karol Szydlowski (AUS)
5 September 2026; 17:00 (UTC+09:00)	(22–25, 19–25, 14–25); Report			Kitakyushu City General Gymnasium, Kitakyushu, Japan; Attendance: 1,725; Referees: Ismail Ibrahim Alblooshi (UAE), Robert Karol Szydlowski (AUS)

7 September 2026; 17:00 (UTC+09:00)	Thailand	3–2	South Korea	Kitakyushu City General Gymnasium, Kitakyushu, Japan; Attendance: 1,195; Referees: Sze Lai Cedric Chung (HKG), Ismail Ibrahim Alblooshi (UAE)
7 September 2026; 17:00 (UTC+09:00)	(25–18, 25–16, 20–25, 22–25, 15–12); Report			Kitakyushu City General Gymnasium, Kitakyushu, Japan; Attendance: 1,195; Referees: Sze Lai Cedric Chung (HKG), Ismail Ibrahim Alblooshi (UAE)

9 September 2026; 13:30 (UTC+09:00)	Chinese Taipei	2–3	Thailand	Kitakyushu City General Gymnasium, Kitakyushu, Japan; Attendance: 1,175; Referees: Sze Lai Cedric Chung (HKG), Ozan Çağı Sarikaya (TUR)
9 September 2026; 13:30 (UTC+09:00)	(23–25, 25–22, 25–23, 22–25, 10–15); Source			Kitakyushu City General Gymnasium, Kitakyushu, Japan; Attendance: 1,175; Referees: Sze Lai Cedric Chung (HKG), Ozan Çağı Sarikaya (TUR)

10 September 2026; 15:30 (UTC+09:00)	Thailand	0–3	Australia	Kitakyushu City General Gymnasium, Kitakyushu, Japan; Attendance: 1,302; Referees: Aidos Akhmetov (KAZ), Sze Lai Cedric Chung (HKG)
10 September 2026; 15:30 (UTC+09:00)	(22–25, 24–26, 19–25); Source			Kitakyushu City General Gymnasium, Kitakyushu, Japan; Attendance: 1,302; Referees: Aidos Akhmetov (KAZ), Sze Lai Cedric Chung (HKG)

== Current squad ==
The following is Thailand roster for the 2026 AVC Continental Championship.

Head coach: (South Korea) Park Ki-won

No.	Position	Name	Date of birth	Height	Spike	Block	2026–27 Club
2	MB	Prasert Pinkaew	30 November 1997	1.89 m (6 ft 2 in)	315 cm (124 in)	305 cm (120 in)	(Thailand) Phitsanulok
3	OP	Amorntep Konhan	6 October 1995	1.87 m (6 ft 2 in)	326 cm (128 in)	303 cm (119 in)	(Thailand) Nakhon Ratchasima
4	OH	Anut Promchan	13 June 1997	1.94 m (6 ft 4 in)	332 cm (131 in)	316 cm (124 in)	(Thailand) Phitsanulok
7	MB	Toopadit Phraput	17 February 2000	1.91 m (6 ft 3 in)	342 cm (135 in)	320 cm (130 in)	(Thailand) Diamond Food
9	OP	Napadet Bhinijdee	24 September 2002	1.97 m (6 ft 6 in)	351 cm (138 in)	323 cm (127 in)	(Thailand) Diamond Food
12	MB	Anuchit Pakdeekaew	29 September 1996	1.92 m (6 ft 4 in)	320 cm (130 in)	315 cm (124 in)	(Thailand) Diamond Food
13	L	Nakharin Inthanu	1 January 2006	1.77 m (5 ft 10 in)	280 cm (110 in)	270 cm (110 in)	(Thailand) Kohkood Cabana
14	L	Pakkapong Kwangnok	13 September 2008	1.78 m (5 ft 10 in)	280 cm (110 in)	270 cm (110 in)	(Thailand) Kohkood Cabana
15	OH	Suwit Mahasiriyothin	25 August 2003	1.96 m (6 ft 5 in)	335 cm (132 in)	320 cm (130 in)	(Thailand) Diamond Food
16	S	Narongrit Janpirom	16 August 1997	1.81 m (5 ft 11 in)	315 cm (124 in)	290 cm (110 in)	(Thailand) PSNKK CLUB
17	S	Boonyarid Wongtorn (c)	29 January 1998	1.84 m (6 ft 0 in)	324 cm (128 in)	302 cm (119 in)	(Thailand) Nakhon Ratchasima
20	MB	Kiadtiphum Ramsin	15 June 2006	1.96 m (6 ft 5 in)	341 cm (134 in)	322 cm (127 in)	(Thailand) Kohkood Cabana
21	OH	Thanat Bamrungphakdi	9 August 2001	1.92 m (6 ft 4 in)	305 cm (120 in)	310 cm (120 in)	(Thailand) Nakhon Ratchasima
22	OH	Anurak Phanram	23 August 1999	1.83 m (6 ft 0 in)	322 cm (127 in)	308 cm (121 in)	(Thailand) Nakhon Ratchasima
26	OH	Chaiwat Thungkham	14 August 2000	1.86 m (6 ft 1 in)	335 cm (132 in)	318 cm (125 in)	(Thailand) Diamond Food

== Former players ==
- Annop Auttakornsiriph
- Anusorn Charunsiriwont
- Aphisak Rakchartyingcheep
- Attaphon Khemdaeng
- Chakkrit Chandahuadong
- Chamnan Dokmai
- Jakraprop Saengsee
- Kantapat Koonmee
- Khanit Sinlapasorn
- Khomkrich Phayooncharn
- Kiattipong Radchatagriengkai
- Kitsada Chanchai
- Kissada Nilsawai
- Kittikun Sriutthawong
- Korn Nanboon
- Lawrach Tonthongkum
- Mawin Maneewong
- Monchai Supajirakul
- Montri Puanglib
- Montri Vaenpradab
- Nattapong Chachamnan
- Nattapong Kesapan
- Nutthapon Srisamutnak
- Panya Makhumleg
- Pattharapong Sripon
- Phadetsuak Wannachote
- Pisanu Harnkhomtun
- Pongsakorn Nimawan
- Ratchapoom Samthong
- Ronnarong Jarupeng
- Sarayut Yutthayong
- Shotivat Tivsuwan
- Somporn Wannaprapa
- Supachai Jitjumroon
- Supachai Sriphum
- Supakorn Jenthaisong
- Surachai Churat
- Surachai Phimdee
- Tanapat Charoensuk
- Teerasak Nakprasong
- Terdsak Sungworakan
- Thanapat Yooyen
- Theerayut Sripon
- Wanchai Tabwises
- Warinthon Kamchoo
- Waroot Wisedsing
- Wutthichai Suksala
- Yossapol Wattana
- Yuranan Buadang
- Yuttachai Ratanawongpak
- Yuttana Kiewpekar
- Yutthapol Jarhenrut

== See also ==
- Thailand women's national volleyball team
