= Volleyball at the 2017 SEA Games – Men's tournament =

Volleyball – Men's tournament at the 2017 SEA Games
- Venue: Malaysia International Trade & Exhibition Centre
- Dates: 21–27 August 2017
- Nations: 8

Medalists
gold medal	Thailand
silver medal	Indonesia
bronze medal	Vietnam

The men's volleyball tournament at the 2017 SEA Games will be held in Kuala Lumpur, Malaysia at the Malaysia International Trade & Exhibition Centre.

== Draw ==
=== Participating nations ===
- Cambodia
- Indonesia
- Malaysia
- Myanmar
- Philippines
- Thailand
- Vietnam

Source: Volleyverse

== Results ==
All times are Malaysia Standard Time (UTC+8)

=== Preliminary round ===
==== Group A ====
Pos	Team	Pld	W	L	Pts	SW	SL	SR	SPW	SPL	SPR	Qualification
1	Thailand	3	3	0	9	9	0	MAX	236	184	1.283	Semifinals
2	Myanmar	3	2	1	5	6	5	1.200	250	240	1.042	Semifinals
3	Malaysia	3	1	2	4	5	6	0.833	257	252	1.020	
4	Cambodia	3	0	3	0	0	9	0.000	163	230	0.709	

Date	Time		Score		Set 1	Set 2	Set 3	Set 4	Set 5	Total	Report
21 Aug	15:00	Myanmar	0–3	Thailand	22–25	19–25	27–29			68–79	Report
21 Aug	19:00	Malaysia	3–0	Cambodia	25–18	30–28	25–17			80–63	Report
22 Aug	17:00	Thailand	3–0	Cambodia	25–13	25–19	25–17			75–49	Report
22 Aug	19:00	Myanmar	3–2	Malaysia	25–23	20–25	25–22	20–25	17–15	107–110	Report
24 Aug	19:00	Malaysia	0–3	Thailand	18–25	19–25	30–32			67–82	Report
25 Aug	17:00	Cambodia	0–3	Myanmar	13–25	20–25	18–25			51–75	Report

==== Group B ====
Pos	Team	Pld	W	L	Pts	SW	SL	SR	SPW	SPL	SPR	Qualification
1	Indonesia	3	3	0	9	9	1	9.000	259	187	1.385	Semifinals
2	Vietnam	3	2	1	6	6	3	2.000	214	168	1.274	Semifinals
3	Philippines	3	1	2	3	4	6	0.667	235	225	1.044	
4	Timor-Leste	3	0	3	0	0	9	0.000	97	225	0.431	

Date	Time		Score		Set 1	Set 2	Set 3	Set 4	Set 5	Total	Report
21 Aug	17:00	Philippines	0–3	Vietnam	19–25	21–25	20–25			60–75	Report
22 Aug	15:00	Indonesia	3–0	Timor-Leste	25–9	25–6	25–8			75–23	Report
23 Aug	17:00	Vietnam	3–0	Timor-Leste	25–8	25–13	25–11			75–32	Report
23 Aug	19:00	Philippines	1–3	Indonesia	21–25	25–23	33–35	21–25		100–108	Report
24 Aug	17:00	Indonesia	3–0	Vietnam	26–24	25–20	25–20			76–64	Report
25 Aug	19:00	Timor-Leste	0–3	Philippines	13–25	18–25	11–25			42–75	Report

=== Final round ===
Semi-finals
26 Aug
Thailand	3
Vietnam	2
26 Aug
Indonesia	3
Myanmar	2

Final
27 Aug
Thailand	3
Indonesia	1
Third place
27 Aug
Vietnam	3
Myanmar	0

==== Semifinals ====
Date	Time		Score		Set 1	Set 2	Set 3	Set 4	Set 5	Total	Report
26 Aug	15:00	Thailand	3–2	Vietnam	22–25	16–25	29–27	25–15	20–18	112–110	Report
26 Aug	17:00	Indonesia	3–2	Myanmar	22–25	25–17	24–26	34–32	15–12	120–112	Report

==== Bronze-medal match ====
Date	Time		Score		Set 1	Set 2	Set 3	Set 4	Set 5	Total	Report
27 Aug	13:00	Vietnam	3–0	Myanmar	25–18	25–17	25–13			75–48	Report

==== Gold-medal match ====
Date	Time		Score		Set 1	Set 2	Set 3	Set 4	Set 5	Total	Report
27 Aug	19:00	Thailand	3–1	Indonesia	25–16	25–22	20–25	25–20		95–83	Report

== Final standings ==
9.3 Classification of Teams and Teams’ Ranking System 9.3.1 In order to establish the ranking of teams after the round-robin competition, the following criteria shall be implemented for all competition: (i) By the number of victories (matches won, matches lost) among teams of the same group. Teams that won more matches will get better ranking. Technical Handbook: Volleyball V9: 17.04.2017 18 (ii) If there is an equal number of victories, then the following criteria shall be applied: ß Number of points gained: If two (2) or more teams have the same number of victories (matches won, matches lost), they shall be classified in descending order by the points gained by each team per match

Rank	Team
1st place, gold medalist(s)	Thailand
2nd place, silver medalist(s)	Indonesia
3rd place, bronze medalist(s)	Vietnam
4	Myanmar
5	Malaysia
5	Philippines
7	Cambodia
7	Timor-Leste

== See also ==
- Women's tournament
