= Indonesia men's national volleyball team =

Men's volleyball team

Indonesia
- Association: Indonesian Volleyball Federation (PBVSI)
- Confederation: AVC
- Head coach: Reidel Toiran
- FIVB ranking: 51 (5 October 2025)

Uniforms
Home	Away	Third

Asian Championship
- Appearances: 11 (First in 1975)
- Best result: 4th (2017)
- pbvsi.or.id
Honours
AVC Cup
Gold medal – first place	2026 Ahmedabad	Team
SEA V Cup
Gold medal – first place	2023 Bogor and Santa Rosa	Team
Gold medal – first place	2025 Jakarta	Team
Silver medal – second place	2024 Manila and Yogyakarta	Team
Silver medal – second place	2025 Candon	Team
Silver medal – second place	2026 Candon	Team
Bronze medal – third place	2026 Jakarta	Team
SEA Games
Gold medal – first place	1981 Manila	Team
Gold medal – first place	1987 Jakarta	Team
Gold medal – first place	1989 Kuala Lumpur	Team
Gold medal – first place	1991 Manila	Team
Gold medal – first place	1993 Singapore	Team
Gold medal – first place	1997 Jakarta	Team
Gold medal – first place	2003 Hanoi and Ho Chi Minh City	Team
Gold medal – first place	2007 Nakhon Ratchasima	Team
Gold medal – first place	2009 Vientiane	Team
Gold medal – first place	2019 Philippines	Team
Gold medal – first place	2021 Hanoi	Team
Gold medal – first place	2023 Phnom Penh	Team
Silver medal – second place	1979 Jakarta	Team
Silver medal – second place	1983 Singapore	Team
Silver medal – second place	1985 Bangkok	Team
Silver medal – second place	2005 Manila	Team
Silver medal – second place	2011 Jakarta and Palembang	Team
Silver medal – second place	2013 Naypyidaw	Team
Silver medal – second place	2017 Kuala Lumpur	Team
Silver medal – second place	2025 Bangkok and Chonburi	Team
Bronze medal – third place	1995 Chiang Mai	Team
Bronze medal – third place	2015 Singapore	Team

The Indonesia men's national volleyball team represents Indonesia in international volleyball tournaments. The team is directed by the Indonesian Volleyball Federation (Persatuan Bola Voli Seluruh Indonesia, PBVSI), the governing body for volleyball in Indonesia, which represents the country in international competitions and friendly matches.

Indonesia has competed in several competitions such as Asian Championship, Asian Games, AVC Cup, SEA Games, and SEA V Cup. With their best result being 4th place in 2017 Asian Championship and 1962 Asian Games.

== History ==
Volleyball first entered Indonesia in 1928 which was brought by the Dutch during the Dutch colonial era. At that time, volleyball was only played by the Dutch and aristocrats, considering that sports in Indonesia at that time were developed by physical education teachers from the Netherlands. In addition, volleyball was also played by soldiers and they often held inter-company matches.

Volleyball grew rapidly in Indonesia, and the Indonesian Volleyball Federation (PBVSI) emerged on 22 January 1955. Then at the same time, the first national volleyball championship was also held in Indonesia. This sport became more popular in Indonesia when the Asian Games IV was held in 1962 as well as Ganefo I the following year. In October 1951, volleyball was competed in the official event of the Second National Sports Week (PON) in Jakarta.

The first international tournament that Indonesia national team participated in was the 1962 Asian Games where they finish in 4th place. Indonesia participated in Asian Championship in eleven edition and finish in 9th place in 2023 tournament. The team appeared in SEA Games final nineteen times and they won twelve gold medal.

== Competition record ==
=== Asian Championship ===
Champions Runners up Third place Fourth place

Asian Championship record
Year	Round	Position	GP	MW	ML	SW	SL	Squad
(Australia) 1975	Round robin	6th	6	1	5	3	16	Squad
(Bahrain) 1979	Did not participate							
(Japan) 1983	9th–11th places	9th	6	2	4	7	12	Squad
(Kuwait) 1987	Did not participate							
(South Korea) 1989	Did not participate							
(Australia) 1991	5th place match	6th	7	3	4	12	14	Squad
(Thailand) 1993	Did not participate							
(South Korea) 1995	Did not participate							
(Qatar) 1997	Did not participate							
(Iran) 1999	5th–8th places	6th	6	3	3	10	13	Squad
(South Korea) 2001	Did not participate							
(China) 2003	Did not participate							
(Thailand) 2005	11th place match	11th	7	5	2	16	12	Squad
(Indonesia) 2007	Championship	7th	7	1	6	7	20	Squad
(Philippines) 2009	5th place match	6th	7	4	3	13	14	Squad
(Iran) 2011	11th place match	11th	7	4	3	14	14	Squad
(United Arab Emirates) 2013	Qualified but withdrew							
(Iran) 2015	Did not participate							
(Indonesia) 2017	Semifinals	4th	8	3	5	12	20	Squad
(Iran) 2019	11th place match	12th	7	2	5	12	16	Squad
(Japan) 2021	Did not participate							
(Iran) 2023	9th place match	9th	6	3	3	15	10	Squad
(Japan) 2026	Did not qualify							
Total	0 Titles	11/23	74	31	43	121	161	—

=== Asian Games ===
Champions Runners up Third place Fourth place

Asian Games record
Year	Round	Position	GP	MW	ML	SW	SL	Squad
(Japan) 1958	Did not participate							
(Indonesia) 1962	Final round	4th	7	4	3	15	12	Squad
(Thailand) 1966	Final round	5th	8	3	5	13	16	Squad
(Thailand) 1970	Round robin	6th	7	2	5	6	16	Squad
(Iran) 1974	Did not participate							
(Thailand) 1978	Did not participate							
(India) 1982	5th–8th places	6th	6	4	2	14	7	Squad
(South Korea) 1986	9th–12th places	10th	8	3	5	11	15	Squad
(China) 1990	Did not participate							
(Japan) 1994	Did not participate							
(Thailand) 1998	5th place match	6th	6	2	4	7	12	Squad
(South Korea) 2002	Did not participate							
(Qatar) 2006	Qualified but withdrew							
(China) 2010	13th place match	13th	8	4	4	12	16	Squad
(South Korea) 2014	Did not participate							
(Indonesia) 2018	5th place match	6th	5	2	3	9	11	Squad
(China) 2022	7th place match	8th	6	3	3	12	11	Squad
(Japan) 2026	Qualified							
Total	0 Titles	10/18	61	27	34	99	116	—

=== AVC Cup ===
Champions Runners up Third place Fourth place

AVC Cup record
Year	Round	Position	GP	MW	ML	SW	SL	Squad
(Sri Lanka) 2018	Did not participate							
(Kyrgyzstan) 2022	Did not participate							
(Taiwan) 2023	5th–8th places	6th	5	3	2	12	9	Squad
(Bahrain) 2024	9th–12th places	11th	4	1	3	4	9	Squad
(Bahrain) 2025	5th–8th places	6th	5	2	3	7	13	Squad
(India) 2026	Final	1st	6	5	1	15	10	Squad
Total	1 Title	4/6	20	11	9	38	41	—

=== Asian Cup ===
Champions Runners up Third place Fourth place

Asian Cup record (Defunct)
Year	Round	Position	GP	MW	ML	SW	SL
(Thailand) 2008	7th place match	8th	6	0	6	4	18
(Iran) 2010	Qualified but withdrew						
(Vietnam) 2012	Did not qualify						
(Kazakhstan) 2014	Did not enter						
(Thailand) 2016	Did not enter						
(Taiwan) 2018	Qualified but withdrew						
(Thailand) 2022	Did not enter						
Total	0 Titles	1/7	6	0	6	4	18

=== SEA Games ===
Champions Runners up Third place Fourth place

SEA Games record
Year	Round	Position	GP	MW	ML	SW	SL	Squad
(Malaysia) 1977	Semifinals	4th						Squad
(Indonesia) 1979	Final	2nd						Squad
(Philippines) 1981	Final	1st						Squad
(Singapore) 1983	Final	2nd	5	3	2	9	8	Squad
(Thailand) 1985	Final	2nd						Squad
(Indonesia) 1987	Final	1st						Squad
(Malaysia) 1989	Final	1st						Squad
(Philippines) 1991	Final	1st						Squad
(Singapore) 1993	Final	1st						Squad
(Thailand) 1995	Semifinals	3rd						Squad
(Indonesia) 1997	Final	1st						Squad
(Brunei) 1999	Not held							
(Malaysia) 2001	Semifinals	4th						Squad
(Vietnam) 2003	Final	1st	5	4	1	14	5	Squad
(Philippines) 2005	Final	2nd	5	3	2	10	8	Squad
(Thailand) 2007	Final	1st	5	4	1	14	7	Squad
(Laos) 2009	Final	1st	4	4	0	12	2	Squad
(Indonesia) 2011	Final	2nd	6	4	2	12	9	Squad
(Myanmar) 2013	Final	2nd	4	3	1	9	7	Squad
(Singapore) 2015	Semifinals	3rd	4	2	2	6	6	Squad
(Malaysia) 2017	Final	2nd	5	4	1	13	6	Squad
(Philippines) 2019	Final	1st	5	5	0	15	0	Squad
(Vietnam) 2021	Final	1st	5	5	0	15	2	Squad
(Cambodia) 2023	Final	1st	5	5	0	15	0	Squad
(Thailand) 2025	Final	2nd	4	3	1	11	5	Squad
Total	12 Titles	24/24	62	48	14	155	65	—

=== SEA V Cup ===
Champions Runners up Third place Fourth place

SEA V Cup record
Year	Round	Position	GP	MW	ML	SW	SL
(Indonesia) (Philippines) 2023	Round robin	1st	3	3	0	9	1
(Indonesia) (Philippines) 2023	Round robin	1st	3	3	0	9	3
(Philippines) (Indonesia) 2024	Round robin	2nd	3	2	1	6	6
(Philippines) (Indonesia) 2024	Round robin	2nd	3	2	1	7	5
(Philippines) (Indonesia) 2025	Round robin	2nd	4	3	1	10	5
(Philippines) (Indonesia) 2025	Round robin	1st	4	4	0	12	5
(Philippines) (Indonesia) 2026	Final	2nd	4	3	1	11	3
(Philippines) (Indonesia) 2026	Semifinals	3rd	4	3	1	10	5
Total	3 Titles	8/8	28	23	5	74	33

== Results and fixtures ==
=== 2026 ===
==== 2026 AVC Cup ====
21 June 2026; 18:00 (UTC+05:30)	South Korea	3–0	Indonesia	Veer Savarkar Sports Complex, Ahmedabad, India; Attendance: 750; Referees: Ahmed Ali Hasan (BHR), Chih Hao Chang (TPE)
21 June 2026; 18:00 (UTC+05:30)	(25–22, 25–22, 25–21); Report			Veer Savarkar Sports Complex, Ahmedabad, India; Attendance: 750; Referees: Ahmed Ali Hasan (BHR), Chih Hao Chang (TPE)

22 June 2026; 18:00 (UTC+05:30)	Qatar	2–3	Indonesia	Veer Savarkar Sports Complex, Ahmedabad, India; Attendance: 1200; Referees: Jatuporn Kittichaisombat (THA), Doszhan Ualkhanov (KAZ)
22 June 2026; 18:00 (UTC+05:30)	(25–23, 22–25, 30–32, 27–25, 13–15); Report			Veer Savarkar Sports Complex, Ahmedabad, India; Attendance: 1200; Referees: Jatuporn Kittichaisombat (THA), Doszhan Ualkhanov (KAZ)

23 June 2026; 18:00 (UTC+05:30)	Indonesia	3–2	Thailand	Veer Savarkar Sports Complex, Ahmedabad, India; Attendance: 550; Referees: Fahad Mohammed I A Alawadhi (QAT), Jaek Passier (AUS)
23 June 2026; 18:00 (UTC+05:30)	(19–25, 25–19, 25–22, 23–25, 15–12); Report			Veer Savarkar Sports Complex, Ahmedabad, India; Attendance: 550; Referees: Fahad Mohammed I A Alawadhi (QAT), Jaek Passier (AUS)

26 June 2026; 18:00 (UTC+05:30)	Indonesia	3–1	Oman	Veer Savarkar Sports Complex, Ahmedabad, India; Attendance: 1000; Referees: Narendrasingh Ripudamansingh Kshatriya (IND), Fahad Mohammed I A Alawadhi (QAT)
26 June 2026; 18:00 (UTC+05:30)	(25–23, 20–25, 25–19, 25–21); Report			Veer Savarkar Sports Complex, Ahmedabad, India; Attendance: 1000; Referees: Narendrasingh Ripudamansingh Kshatriya (IND), Fahad Mohammed I A Alawadhi (QAT)

27 June 2026; 19:00 (UTC+05:30)	India	2–3	Indonesia	Veer Savarkar Sports Complex, Ahmedabad, India; Attendance: 2750; Referees: Fahad Mohammed I A Alawadhi (QAT), Chih Hao Chang (TPE)
27 June 2026; 19:00 (UTC+05:30)	(25–15, 24–26,23–25, 25–19, 13–15); Report			Veer Savarkar Sports Complex, Ahmedabad, India; Attendance: 2750; Referees: Fahad Mohammed I A Alawadhi (QAT), Chih Hao Chang (TPE)

28 June 2026; 19:00 (UTC+05:30)	South Korea	0–3	Indonesia	Veer Savarkar Sports Complex, Ahmedabad, India; Attendance: 1500; Referees: Narendrasingh Ripudamansingh Kshatriya (IND), Mary Kerekere (NZL)
28 June 2026; 19:00 (UTC+05:30)	(32–34, 16–25,23–25); Report			Veer Savarkar Sports Complex, Ahmedabad, India; Attendance: 1500; Referees: Narendrasingh Ripudamansingh Kshatriya (IND), Mary Kerekere (NZL)

==== 2026 SEA V Cup ====
16 July 2026; 17:30 (UTC+08:00)	Indonesia	3–0	Cambodia	Candon City Arena, Candon, Philippines
16 July 2026; 17:30 (UTC+08:00)	(25–18, 25–18, 25–21)			Candon City Arena, Candon, Philippines

17 July 2026; 17:30 (UTC+08:00)	Indonesia	3–0	Philippines	Candon City Arena, Candon, Philippines
17 July 2026; 17:30 (UTC+08:00)	(25–20, 25–23, 27–25)			Candon City Arena, Candon, Philippines

18 July 2026; 20:00 (UTC+08:00)	Indonesia	3–0	Vietnam	Candon City Arena, Candon, Philippines
18 July 2026; 20:00 (UTC+08:00)	(25–22, 25–20, 25–22)			Candon City Arena, Candon, Philippines

19 July 2026; 17:30 (UTC+08:00)	Indonesia	2–3	Cambodia	Candon City Arena, Candon, Philippines
19 July 2026; 17:30 (UTC+08:00)	(23–25, 26–28, 25–23, 25–22, 11–15)			Candon City Arena, Candon, Philippines

22 July 2026; 19:00 (UTC+07:00)	Indonesia	3–0	Cambodia	Jakarta International Velodrome, Jakarta, Indonesia
22 July 2026; 19:00 (UTC+07:00)	(26–24, 25–15, 25–17)			Jakarta International Velodrome, Jakarta, Indonesia

24 July 2026; 19:00 (UTC+07:00)	Indonesia	3–1	Philippines	Jakarta International Velodrome, Jakarta, Indonesia
24 July 2026; 19:00 (UTC+07:00)	(25–18, 25–17, 23–25, 25–19)			Jakarta International Velodrome, Jakarta, Indonesia

25 July 2026; 19:00 (UTC+07:00)	Indonesia	1–3	Vietnam	Jakarta International Velodrome, Jakarta, Indonesia
25 July 2026; 19:00 (UTC+07:00)	(25–22, 22–25, 19–25, 18–25)			Jakarta International Velodrome, Jakarta, Indonesia

26 July 2026; 15:30 (UTC+07:00)	Indonesia	3–1	Cambodia	Jakarta International Velodrome, Jakarta, Indonesia
26 July 2026; 15:30 (UTC+07:00)	(25–18, 19–25, 25–20, 26–24)			Jakarta International Velodrome, Jakarta, Indonesia

== Team ==
=== Current roster ===
The following is the Indonesia roster for the 2026 AVC Cup.

Head coach: (Cuba) Reidel Toiran

No.	Pos.	Name	Date of birth	Height	Spike	Block	2025–26 club
2	MB	Putra Bagus Hidayatullah	20 July 2008	198 cm (6 ft 6 in)	325 cm (10 ft 8 in)	315 cm (10 ft 4 in)	(Indonesia) Indomaret Sidoarjo
3	OH	Boy Arnez Arabi	22 October 2003	188 cm (6 ft 2 in)	355 cm (11 ft 8 in)	335 cm (11 ft 0 in)	(Indonesia) Bogor LavAni
4	MB	Hendra Kurniawan	27 May 2003	196 cm (6 ft 5 in)	350 cm (11 ft 6 in)	335 cm (11 ft 0 in)	(Indonesia) Bogor LavAni
5	OP	Dawuda Alaihimassalam	2 May 2005	198 cm (6 ft 6 in)	320 cm (10 ft 6 in)	312 cm (10 ft 3 in)	(Indonesia) Bogor LavAni
8	S	Jasen Natanael Kilanta	20 February 1999	188 cm (6 ft 2 in)	300 cm (9 ft 10 in)	305 cm (10 ft 0 in)	(Indonesia) Pasundan Bandung
10	MB	Raden Ahmad Gumilar	21 March 2003	196 cm (6 ft 5 in)	340 cm (11 ft 2 in)	330 cm (10 ft 10 in)	(Indonesia) Jakarta Bhayangkara Presisi
11	OH	Doni Haryono	21 February 1999	191 cm (6 ft 3 in)	340 cm (11 ft 2 in)	335 cm (11 ft 0 in)	(Thailand) Nakhon Ratchasima QminC
12	OP	Rama Fazza Fauzan	9 September 2002	196 cm (6 ft 5 in)	332 cm (10 ft 11 in)	313 cm (10 ft 3 in)	(Indonesia) Surabaya Samator
13	L	Raihan Rizky Attorif	25 January 2006	173 cm (5 ft 8 in)	286 cm (9 ft 5 in)	279 cm (9 ft 2 in)	(Indonesia) Pasundan Bandung
14	OH	Farhan Halim	26 April 2001	193 cm (6 ft 4 in)	332 cm (10 ft 11 in)	313 cm (10 ft 3 in)	(Indonesia) Pasundan Bandung
16	MB	Tedi Oka Syahputra	23 October 2000	195 cm (6 ft 5 in)	345 cm (11 ft 4 in)	340 cm (11 ft 2 in)	(Indonesia) Surabaya Samator
21	L	Muhammad Reyhan	22 May 2007	182 cm (6 ft 0 in)	329 cm (10 ft 10 in)	315 cm (10 ft 4 in)	(Indonesia) VM Bandung Tectona
25	OP	Fauzan Nibras	31 May 2008	190 cm (6 ft 3 in)	320 cm (10 ft 6 in)	301 cm (9 ft 11 in)	(Indonesia) Pasundan Bandung
27	S	Alfin Daniel Pratama	2 May 2002	184 cm (6 ft 0 in)	310 cm (10 ft 2 in)	300 cm (9 ft 10 in)	(Indonesia) Jakarta Bhayangkara Presisi

=== Coaching staff ===
As of June 2026

Position	Staff
Manager	(Indonesia) Loudry Maspaitella
Head coach	(Cuba) Reidel Toiran
Assistant coaches	(Indonesia) Nur Widayanto
Assistant coaches	(Indonesia) Lardi
Physical trainer	(Indonesia) Setiawan Adi Praja
Analyst	(Indonesia) Bangun Suradesa
Massage specialist	(Indonesia) Sarwo Wibowo Teguh

=== Coaching history ===
Caretaker managers are listed in italics.

- (Indonesia) Wienarto (1989)
- (China) Li Qiujiang (2005–2007; 2009–2012; 2019; 2024)
- (China) Hu Xinyu (2007–2008)
- (Indonesia) Ibarsjah Djanu (2013–2015)
- (Indonesia) Samsul Jais (2017–2018)
- (China) Jiang Jie (2022–2023; 2025)
- (Cuba) Reidel Toiran (2026–)

== Kit providers ==
The table below shows the history of kit providers for the Indonesia national volleyball team.

Period	Kit provider
2019	Mizuno
2024–	Speed

== See also ==
- Indonesia women's national volleyball team
- Indonesia men's national under-21 volleyball team
