= 2026 AVC Men's Volleyball Cup squads =

This article shows the squads of all participating teams for the 2026 AVC Men's Volleyball Cup in Ahmedabad, India.

== Pool A ==
=== Australia ===
The following was Australia's roster at the 2026 AVC Men's Volleyball Cup.

Head coach: (Australia) Daniel Ilott

- 4 Jackson Holland L
- 6 Ethan Garrett OH
- 7 James Weir MB
- 8 Trent O'Dea MB
- 9 Matthew Aubrey OP
- 10 Sam Flowerday OH
- 16 Mitchell Croft MB
- 17 Joel McGruther MB
- 19 William D'Arcy-Miles OP
- 21 Nicholas Butler S
- 25 Ky Landers OH
- 26 Billy Greber S
- 27 Max Senica OH
- 40 Steven Yarad MB

=== Bahrain ===
The following was Bahrain's roster at the 2026 AVC Men's Volleyball Cup.

Head coach: (Montenegro) Ivan Joksimovic

- 1 Ali Ebrahim S
- 4 Hasan Warqaa MB
- 6 Sayed Hashem Ali OH
- 7 Mahmood Alafyah S
- 8 Mahmood Ahmed OH
- 9 Mohamed Abdulla MB
- 13 Ali Khamis OP
- 16 Mahmood Salman OH
- 18 Ayman Haroon L
- 20 Abbas Sultan L
- 28 Ahmed Mohamed Saleh OH
- 77 Ali Yusuf MB
- 88 Hasan Haider MB
- 99 Abdulla Ebrahim OP

=== Chinese Taipei ===
The following was Chinese Taipei's roster at the 2026 AVC Men's Volleyball Cup.

Head coach: (Taiwan) Huang Hung-Yu

- 1 Chiang Yao-Kai Lu MB
- 2 Huang Yu-Chen S
- 4 Yuan Li OH
- 7 Chen Jie-Ting S
- 8 Chuang Shao-Chieh MB
- 10 Chang Yu-Chen OH
- 11 Chen You-Cheng L
- 12 Liu Yu Lin OH
- 13 Chun-Yu Li MB
- 15 Wang Ping Hsun MB
- 16 Jhang Yun-Liang L
- 20 Tseng Mao-Tsung OP
- 77 Wen Yi-Kai OH
- 99 Huang Jeng-Liang OP

=== India ===
The following was India's roster at the 2026 AVC Men's Volleyball Cup.

Head coach: (Serbia) Dragan Mihailovic

- 1 Amrinderpal Singh MB
- 5 Joel Benjamin Jebaraj OH
- 6 Erin Varghese OH
- 8 Muhammad Nihal Chatham OP
- 9 Chirag Yadav OH
- 10 Anand Kottarathil L
- 12 Jerome Vinith Charles OP
- 14 Om Vasant Lad S
- 16 Muthusamy Appavu S
- 17 John Joseph Eanthungal MB
- 19 Shikhar Singh MB
- 21 Hemanth Pulparambil OH
- 23 Shameemudheen Ammarambath MB
- 28 Ramanathan Ramamoorthy L

=== Kazakhstan ===
The following was Kazakhstan's roster at the 2026 AVC Men's Volleyball Cup.

Head coach: (Kazakhstan) Sergey Trikoz

- 2 Murojon Khavazmatov L
- 3 Nurlybek Maksat S
- 4 Azamat Seilkhanov OH
- 8 Aibek Zhaxylykov MB
- 15 Islam Assym L
- 21 Nurlibek Nurmakhambetov S
- 22 Ilya Tavolzhanskiy OP
- 23 Dinmukhammed Kabdulov MB
- 27 Assylkhan Izbergenuly OH
- 28 Adilzhan Baltabayev MB
- 39 Anton Kuznetsov MB
- 52 Klim Ryukhov OH
- 66 Vladislav Mastikhin OH
- 99 Diyorbek Ikramov OP

=== New Zealand ===
The following was New Zealand's roster at the 2026 AVC Men's Volleyball Cup.

Head coach: (Chile) Sebastian Antonio Gonzalez

- 1 Luke Connor Hulston L
- 2 Alan Willson Hodder OH
- 3 Scott Geoffrey Shipton L
- 4 Kyle Alan Smith OH
- 6 Carrick James Corson MB
- 7 Troy Cameron Hulston S
- 9 Thomas Peter Vesty S
- 10 Robert Paul Maxwell MB
- 11 Lancer Aoto'a Filo Leilua-Tiatia MB
- 12 William John Hull MB
- 13 Pesamino Philip Morrison OP
- 14 Seth Dylan Grant OP
- 20 Jackson Kopupapa Taurarii OH
- 23 Liam Chris Smith OH

== Pool B ==
=== Indonesia ===
The following was Indonesia's roster at the 2026 AVC Men's Volleyball Cup.

Head coach: (Cuba) Reidel Toiran

- 2 Putra Bagus Hidayatulloh MB
- 3 Boy Arnez Arabi OH
- 4 Hendra Kurniawan MB
- 5 Dawuda Alaihimas Salam OP
- 8 Jasen Natanael Kilanta S
- 10 Ahmad Gumilar MB
- 11 Doni Haryono OH
- 12 Rama Fazza Fauzan OP
- 13 Raihan Rizky Attorif L
- 14 Farhan Halim OH
- 16 Tedi Oka Syahputra MB
- 21 Muhamad Reyhan L
- 25 Fauzan Nibras OP
- 27 Alfin Daniel Pratama S

=== Oman ===
The following was Oman's roster at the 2026 AVC Men's Volleyball Cup.

Head coach: (Tunisia) Nizar Chekili

- 1 Saud Rashid Salim MB
- 4 Younis Mohammed Al-Aamri L
- 6 Majid Abdallah Ali Al-Shibli OH
- 7 Adam Jamil Sulaiyam OH
- 9 Mahmood Khalifa Al Saadi OH
- 10 Abdullah Mohammed AL Maqbali L
- 11 Ismail Rashid Al hidi OP
- 12 Hamed Khamis Al Mamari MB
- 13 Fallah Saleem Al Jaradi OH
- 14 Osama Sulaiman Al-Mamari S
- 15 Mohammed Salim Mohammed Al-maqbali S
- 17 Mohammed Eid Al Saifi OH
- 20 Saleh Rashid Al Jalaboubi MB
- 21 Matasam Mubarak Al-Harthi OP

=== Qatar ===
The following was Qatar's roster at the 2026 AVC Men's Volleyball Cup.

Head coach: (Argentina) Camilo Soto

- 1 Youssef Oughlaf OH
- 2 Papemaguette Diagne MB
- 4 Ribeiro Renan OH
- 7 Belal Abunabot MB
- 9 Milos Stevanovic S
- 10 Ghanim Al-Remaihi L
- 11 Nikola Vasic OH
- 12 Mubarak Dahi OP
- 14 Yousef Alyafeai OH
- 15 Mahdi Badreddin Sammoud S
- 19 Naji Mahmoud L
- 20 Abdallah Ibrahim Nassim MB
- 21 Ilija Ivoic OH
- 29 Mubarak Musa Madut OH

=== South Korea ===
The following was South Korea's roster at the 2026 AVC Men's Volleyball Cup.

Head coach: (Brazil) Issanaye Ramires

- 1 Cha Young-seok MB
- 2 Hwang Taek-eui S
- 5 Park Kyeong-min L
- 6 Kim Yeong-jun L
- 9 Lim Sung-jin OH
- 12 Park Chang-seong MB
- 15 Kim Gwan-woo S
- 16 Jeong Han-yong OH
- 18 Choi Jun-hyeok MB
- 20 Lee Sang-hyeon MB
- 30 Shin Ho-jin OP
- 75 Kim Yo-han OP
- 77 Yun Seo-jin OH
- 88 Lim Jae-young OH

=== Thailand ===
The following was Thailand's roster at the 2026 AVC Men's Volleyball Cup.

Head coach: (South Korea) Park Ki-won

- 1 Nattapong Chachamnan L
- 3 Amornthep Khonhan OP
- 7 Toopadit Phraput MB
- 9 Napadet Bhinijdee OP
- 10 Jakkrit Thanomnoi OH
- 12 Anuchit Pakdeekaew MB
- 13 Nakharin Inthanu L
- 16 Narongrit Janpirom S
- 20 Kiadtiphum Ramsin MB
- 21 Thanat Bamrungphakdi OH
- 22 Anurak Phanram OH
- 23 Kongkapan Thongkhao S
- 26 Chaiwat Thungkham OH
- 43 Thanathat Thaweerat MB
