= Volleyball at the 2001 SEA Games =

Volleyball competition

- Venue: Kuala Lumpur Badminton Stadium
- Dates: 9–16 September 2001

The Volleyball competitions at the 2001 SEA Games was held from 9 to 16 September 2001 in Kuala Lumpur, Malaysia. This edition featured both tournaments for men's and women's team. All matches were held in Kuala Lumpur Badminton Stadium.

== Medalists ==
Event	Gold	Silver	Bronze
Men's	Thailand (THA)	Malaysia (MAS)	Myanmar (MYA)
Women's	Thailand (THA)	Vietnam (VIE)	Philippines (PHI)

== Men's tournament ==
- All times are Malaysia Standard Time (UTC+08:00)

=== Round robin ===
Pos	Team	Pld	W	L	Pts	SPW	SPL	SPR	SW	SL	SR
1	Thailand	0	0	0	0	0	0	—	0	0	—
2	Malaysia	0	0	0	0	0	0	—	0	0	—
3	Myanmar	0	0	0	0	0	0	—	0	0	—
4	Indonesia	0	0	0	0	0	0	—	0	0	—
?	Vietnam	0	0	0	0	0	0	—	0	0	—
?	Philippines	0	0	0	0	0	0	—	0	0	—

Date	Time		Score		Set 1	Set 2	Set 3	Set 4	Set 5	Total	Report
09 Sep	16:00	Vietnam	1–3	Thailand	15–25	25–21	19–25	15–25		74–96	
09 Sep	18:00	Indonesia	–	Philippines	–	–	–			0–0	
09 Sep	20:00	Myanmar	1–3	Malaysia	25–23	20–25	24–26	27–29		96–103	
10 Sep	16:00	Thailand	3–2	Myanmar	19–25	25–15	25–22	18–25	17–15	104–102	
10 Sep	18:00	Philippines	–	Vietnam	–	–	–			0–0	
10 Sep	20:00	Malaysia	3–2	Indonesia	25–21	24–26	25–22	24–26	15–13	113–108	
11 Sep	16:00	Indonesia	0–3	Vietnam	21–25	25–27	22–25			68–77	
11 Sep	18:00	Malaysia	–	Thailand	–	–	–			0–0	
11 Sep	20:00	Myanmar	–	Philippines	–	–	–			0–0	
12 Sep	16:00	Thailand	3–0	Indonesia	25–18	25–20	25–19			75–57	
12 Sep	18:00	Philippines	–	Malaysia	–	–	–			0–0	
12 Sep	20:00	Myanmar	3–0	Vietnam	25–17	25–23	25–18			75–58	
13 Sep	16:00	Philippines	–	Thailand	–	–	–			0–0	
13 Sep	18:00	Myanmar	–	Indonesia	–	–	–			0–0	
13 Sep	20:00	Malaysia	3–0	Vietnam	25–20	25–19	25–20			75–59	

=== Knockout stage ===
==== Semi-finals ====
September 15, 2001	Thailand	3–?	Indonesia	Kuala Lumpur Badminton Stadium

September 15, 2001	Malaysia	3–?	Myanmar	Kuala Lumpur Badminton Stadium

==== Bronze-medal match ====
September 16, 2001; 13:00 UTC+8	Myanmar	3–0	Indonesia	Kuala Lumpur Badminton Stadium

==== Gold-medal match ====
September 16, 2001; 19:00 UTC+8	Thailand	3–0	Malaysia	Kuala Lumpur Badminton Stadium
September 16, 2001; 19:00 UTC+8	(25–20, 25–17, 25–14)			Kuala Lumpur Badminton Stadium

=== Final standing ===
Rank	Team
1st place, gold medalist(s)	Thailand
2nd place, silver medalist(s)	Malaysia
3rd place, bronze medalist(s)	Myanmar
4	Indonesia
?	Vietnam
?	Philippines

== Women's tournament ==
- All times are Malaysia Standard Time (UTC+08:00)

Qualified for the 1st–4th place match
Qualified for the 5th place match

=== Preliminary round ===
==== Group A ====
Pos	Team	Pld	W	L	Pts	SPW	SPL	SPR	SW	SL	SR
1	Philippines	2	2	0	4	199	195	1.021	6	3	2.000
2	Indonesia	2	1	1	3	214	208	1.029	5	5	1.000
3	Malaysia	2	0	2	2	196	206	0.951	3	6	0.500

Date	Time		Score		Set 1	Set 2	Set 3	Set 4	Set 5	Total	Report
09 Sep	09:00	Indonesia	2–3	Philippines	19–25	25–22	25–11	24–26	14–16	107–100	
11 Sep	13:00	Philippines	3–1	Malaysia	25–14	21–25	28–26	25–23		99–88	
13 Sep	13:00	Malaysia	2–3	Indonesia	26–28	23–25	25–21	25–18	9–15	108–107	

==== Group B ====
Pos	Team	Pld	W	L	Pts	SPW	SPL	SPR	SW	SL	SR
1	Thailand	0	0	0	0	0	0	—	0	0	—
2	Vietnam	0	0	0	0	0	0	—	0	0	—
3	Singapore	0	0	0	0	0	0	—	0	0	—
4	Myanmar	0	0	0	0	0	0	—	0	0	—

Date	Time		Score		Set 1	Set 2	Set 3	Set 4	Set 5	Total	Report
09 Sep	11:00	Thailand	3–0	Singapore	25–6	25–14	25–8			75–28	
09 Sep	13:00	Myanmar	–	Vietnam	–	–	–			0–0	
11 Sep	09:00	Myanmar	–	Singapore	–	–	–			0–0	
11 Sep	11:00	Vietnam	0–3	Thailand	12–25	17–25	16–25			45–75	
13 Sep	09:00	Thailand	–	Myanmar	–	–	–			0–0	
13 Sep	11:00	Singapore	0–3	Vietnam	16–25	13–25	16–25			45–75	

=== Knockout stage ===
==== Semi-finals ====
September 15, 2001	Thailand	3–0	Indonesia	Kuala Lumpur Badminton Stadium
September 15, 2001	(25–15, 25–12, 25–18)			Kuala Lumpur Badminton Stadium

September 15, 2001	Vietnam	3–2	Philippines	Kuala Lumpur Badminton Stadium
September 15, 2001	(26–24, 21–25, 30–28, 20–25, 15–11)			Kuala Lumpur Badminton Stadium

==== Fifth place match ====
September 16, 2001; 09:00	Malaysia	3–0	Singapore	Kuala Lumpur Badminton Stadium
September 16, 2001; 09:00	(25–15, 25–15, 25–11)			Kuala Lumpur Badminton Stadium

==== Bronze-medal match ====
September 16, 2001; 15:00 UTC+8	Philippines	3–1	Indonesia	Kuala Lumpur Badminton Stadium
September 16, 2001; 15:00 UTC+8	(16–25, 25–19, 25–19, 25–19)			Kuala Lumpur Badminton Stadium

==== Gold-medal match ====
September 16, 2001; 17:00 UTC+8	Thailand	3–0	Vietnam	Kuala Lumpur Badminton Stadium

=== Final standing ===
Rank	Team
1st place, gold medalist(s)	Thailand
2nd place, silver medalist(s)	Vietnam
3rd place, bronze medalist(s)	Philippines
4	Indonesia
5	Malaysia
6	Singapore
7	Myanmar
