= Montri Vaenpradab =

Thai volleyball player (born 1987)

Personal information
- Full name: Montri Vaenpradab
- Nickname: Tong
- Born: August 18, 1987 (age 39); Ratchaburi, Thailand
- Height: 1.96 m (6 ft 5 in)
- Weight: 75 kg (165 lb)
- Spike: 339 cm (133 in)
- Block: 310 cm (120 in)

Volleyball information
- Position: Middle blocker
- Current club: Kohkood Cabana
- Number: 2

National team
2010–2017	Thailand

Montri Vaenpradab (Thai: มนตรี แหวนประดับ, born August 18, 1987) is a member of the Thailand men's national volleyball team.

== Career ==
Montri played on loan with the Thai club Air Force for the 2017 season. In 2024 Montri played with Kohkood Cabana.

== Clubs ==
- (Thailand) Chiang Rai (2010–2012)
- (Thailand) Cosmo - Chiang Rai (2012–2013)
- (Thailand) Sisaket Suandusit (2013–2014)
- (Thailand) Krungkao Air Force (2014–2015)
- (Thailand) Ratchaburi (2015–2018)
- (Thailand) Air Force Men's Volleyball Club (2017)
- (Thailand) Visakha (2018–2019)
- (Thailand) Prince (2019–2020)
- (Thailand) Air Force Men's Volleyball Club (2019–2020)
- (Thailand) Kohkood Cabana (2024–2025)

== Awards ==
=== Individuals ===
- 2010–11 Thailand League "Best Blocker"

=== Club ===
- 2011-12 Thailand League - Runner-Up, with Chiang Rai
- 2015 Thai-Denmark Super League - Bronze Medal, with Krungkao Air Force
- 2016–17 Thailand League - Third, with Ratchaburi
- 2018–19 Thailand League - Third, with Visakha

== Royal decoration ==
- 2015 - Gold Medalist (Sixth Class) of The Most Admirable Order of the Direkgunabhorn
