= 2023 SEA Men's V.League =

Southeast Asian volleyball tournament

- Association: Southeast Asian Volleyball Association
- League: SEA V.League
- Sport: Volleyball
- Duration: 21–30 July 2023
- Matches: 6
- Teams: 4
- Total attendance: 14,000
- Average attendance: 1,167

First Leg
- Season champions: Indonesia
- Runners-up: Thailand
- Season MVP: (Indonesia) Fahry Septian Putratama

Second Leg
- Season champions: Indonesia
- Runners-up: Vietnam
- Season MVP: (Indonesia) Farhan Halim

Seasons
- 2024 →

The 2023 SEA Men's V.League was the inaugural edition of the SEA V.League, contested by four men's national teams that are the members of the Southeast Asian Volleyball Association (SAVA), the sport's regional governing body affiliated to Asian Volleyball Confederation (AVC). Prior to 2023, the SEA V.League was known as the ASEAN Grand Prix and only women's tournaments were held.

The first leg was held in Bogor, Indonesia from 21 to 23 July while the second leg was held in Santa Rosa, Philippines from 28 to 30 July.

== Teams ==
- Indonesia
- Philippines
- Thailand
- Vietnam

== Venues ==
First Leg	Second Leg
Bogor, Indonesia	Santa Rosa, Philippines
Polisi Kunarto Gymnasium	Santa Rosa Sports Complex
Capacity: 1,000	Capacity: 5,700

== Pool standing procedure ==
1. Total number of victories (matches won, matches lost)
2. In the event of a tie, the following first tiebreaker was to apply: The teams was to be ranked by the most point gained per match as follows:
  - Match won 3–0 or 3–1: 3 points for the winner, 0 points for the loser
  - Match won 3–2: 2 points for the winner, 1 point for the loser
  - Match forfeited: 3 points for the winner, 0 points (0–25, 0–25, 0–25) for the loser

== First leg ==
=== Results ===
- All times are Western Indonesian Time (UTC+07:00).

Pos	Team	Pld	W	L	Pts	SW	SL	SR	SPW	SPL	SPR
1	Indonesia (H)	3	3	0	9	9	1	9.000	248	210	1.181
2	Thailand	3	2	1	6	7	3	2.333	243	230	1.057
3	Vietnam	3	1	2	2	3	8	0.375	237	254	0.933
4	Philippines	3	0	3	1	2	9	0.222	224	258	0.868

Source: Daily Bulletin #4
(H) Host

Date	Time		Score		Set 1	Set 2	Set 3	Set 4	Set 5	Total	Report
21 Jul	15:00	Thailand	3–0	Vietnam	25–23	28–26	25–21			78–70	Report
21 Jul	18:30	Indonesia	3–0	Philippines	25–20	25–22	25–19			75–61	Report
22 Jul	15:00	Philippines	0–3	Thailand	22–25	20–25	20–25			62–75	Report
22 Jul	18:30	Indonesia	3–0	Vietnam	25–20	25–19	25–20			75–59	Report
23 Jul	15:00	Vietnam	3–2	Philippines	22–25	21–25	25–18	25–23	15–10	108–101	Report
23 Jul	18:30	Indonesia	3–1	Thailand	21–25	25–17	25–23	27–25		98–90	Report

=== Final standing ===
Rank	Team
1st place, gold medalist(s)	Indonesia
2nd place, silver medalist(s)	Thailand
3rd place, bronze medalist(s)	Vietnam
4	Philippines

2023 SEA V.League – First Leg champions

Indonesia
1st title

14–man roster
Boy Arnez Arabi, Hendra Kurniawan, Musa Bikhan, Dimas Saputra, Jordan Michael Imanuel, Jasen N. Kilanta, Doni Haryono, Fahri Septian Putratama, Muhammad Malizi, Irpan, Farhan Halim, Dio Zulfikri, Cep Indra Agustin, Prasojo
Head coach
Jiang Jie

=== Awards ===
- Most valuable player
  Fahri Septian Putratama (INA)
- Best setter
  Đinh Văn Duy (VIE)
- Best outside spikers
  Anurak Phanram (THA)
  Farhan Halim (INA)
- Best middle blockers
  Kissada Nilsawai (THA)
  Hendra Kurniawan (INA)
- Best opposite spiker
  Steven Charles Rotter (PHI)
- Best libero
  Tanapat Charoensuk (THA)

== Second leg ==
=== Results ===
- All times are Philippine Standard Time (UTC+08:00).

Pos	Team	Pld	W	L	Pts	SW	SL	SR	SPW	SPL	SPR
1	Indonesia	3	3	0	8	9	3	3.000	281	250	1.124
2	Vietnam	3	2	1	4	7	7	1.000	310	296	1.047
3	Thailand	3	1	2	4	7	8	0.875	320	338	0.947
4	Philippines (H)	3	0	3	2	4	9	0.444	273	300	0.910

Source: Daily Bulletin #4
(H) Host

Date	Time		Score		Set 1	Set 2	Set 3	Set 4	Set 5	Total	Report
28 Jul	16:00	Vietnam	1–3	Indonesia	23–25	25–21	14–25	23–25		85–96	Report
28 Jul	19:00	Philippines	2–3	Thailand	24–26	27–25	25–21	23–25	15–17	114–114	Report
29 Jul	15:00	Thailand	2–3	Vietnam	20–25	19–25	30–28	25–21	9–15	103–114	Report
29 Jul	18:00	Philippines	0–3	Indonesia	20–25	22–25	20–25			62–75	Report
30 Jul	15:00	Thailand	2–3	Indonesia	27–25	25–20	21–25	21–25	9–15	103–110	Report
30 Jul	18:00	Philippines	2–3	Vietnam	25–22	18–25	20–25	26–24	8–15	97–111	Report

=== Awards ===
- Most valuable player
  Farhan Halim (INA)
- Best setter
  Đinh Văn Duy (VIE)
- Best outside spikers
  Jakkrit Thanomnoi (THA)
  Boy Arnez Arabi (INA)
- Best middle blockers
  Hendra Kurniawan (INA)
  Trương Thế Khải (VIE)
- Best opposite spiker
  Steven Charles Rotter (PHI)
- Best libero
  Prasojo (INA)

== Final standing ==
Rank	Team
1st place, gold medalist(s)	Indonesia
2nd place, silver medalist(s)	Vietnam
3rd place, bronze medalist(s)	Thailand
4	Philippines

2023 SEA V.League – Second Leg champions

Indonesia
2nd title

14–man roster
Boy Arnez Arabi, Hendra Kurniawan, Musa Bikhan, Dimas Saputra, Jasen N. Kilanta, Doni Haryono, Fahri Septian Putratama, Muhammad Malizi, Irpan, Farhan Halim, Dio Zulfikri, Akbar Amin Kurnia Sandi, Cep Indra Agustin, Prasojo
Head coach
Jiang Jie

== Results and standings ==
Leg	Date	Location	Champions	Runners-up	Third place	Purse ($)	Winner's share ($)
1	21–23 July 2023	(Indonesia) Bogor	Indonesia (1)	Thailand (1)	Vietnam (1)	50,000	17,000
2	28–30 July 2023	(Philippines) Santa Rosa	Indonesia (2)	Vietnam (1)	Thailand (1)	50,000	17,000

== See also ==
- 2023 SEA Women's V.League
