= Hendra Kurniawan =

Indonesian volleyball player (born 2003)

Personal information
- Full name: Hendra Kurniawan
- Nickname: Hendra
- Born: 27 May 2003 (age 23); Rokan Hulu, Riau
- Height: 196 cm (6 ft 5 in)
- Weight: 84 kg (185 lb)
- Spike: 355 cm (11 ft 8 in)
- Block: 345 cm (11 ft 4 in)

Volleyball information
- Position: Middle blocker
- Current club: Jakarta Lavani Livin Transmedia
- Number: 4

Career
Years	Teams
2022–2023	(Indonesia) Jakarta Lavani Allo Bank
2023	(Indonesia) Jakarta Bhayangkara Presisi (loan)
2023–	(Indonesia) Jakarta Lavani Livin Transmedia

National team
2023–	Indonesia
Honours
Men's volleyball
Representing Indonesia
AVC Cup
Gold medal – first place	2026 Ahmedabad	Team
SEA Games
Gold medal – first place	2023 Cambodia	Team
Silver medal – second place	2025 Thailand	Team
SEA V Cup
Gold medal – first place	2023 Bogor	Team
Gold medal – first place	2023 Santa Rosa	Team
Gold medal – first place	2025 Jakarta	Team
Silver medal – second place	2024 Manila	Team
Silver medal – second place	2024 Yogyakarta	Team
Silver medal – second place	2025 Candon City	Team
Silver medal – second place	2026 Candon City	Team
Bronze medal – third place	2026 Jakarta	Team
- Last updated: August 1, 2026

Hendra Kurniawan (born 27 May 2003) is an Indonesian volleyball player. He is currently defending the Jakarta LavAni Livin Transmedia club in 2026 Proliga. He has also been an Indonesia men's national volleyball team player since 2023.

== Career ==
=== Club ===
Hendra was one of the many players who successfully passed the selection process when the LavAni club was first established in 2020. Prior to joining LavAni, he had already begun his volleyball career in his hometown at the age of 11. In his debut professional season in the Proliga, he helped LavAni secure their first championship title in the competition. He was also part of LavAni's main squad and helped the club earn promotion to the 2023 Livoli Premier Division (Divisi Utama) during the 2022 Livoli Division I campaign.

In 2023, in addition to helping LavAni win their second consecutive Proliga title, he was named the competition's best middle blocker. He was also recruited by the Jakarta Bhayangkara Presisi club to compete in the 2023 Asian Club Championship held in Bahrain.

=== National team ===
His career with the Indonesia men's national volleyball team began at the 2023 SEA Games. He helped the team win the gold medal at the event.

== Honours ==
=== Club ===
- AVC Champions League
  - 2023 – with Jakarta Bhayangkara Presisi
- Domestic
  - 2022 Indonesian Proliga with Jakarta LavAni
  - 2022 Indonesian Livoli Division I with Jakarta LavAni
  - 2023 Indonesian Proliga with Jakarta LavAni
  - 2024 Indonesian Livoli Premier Division with Jakarta LavAni
  - 2024 Indonesian Proliga with Jakarta LavAni
  - 2025 Indonesian Livoli Premier Division with Jakarta LavAni
  - 2025 Indonesian Proliga with Jakarta LavAni
  - 2026 Indonesian Livoli Premier Division with Jakarta LavAni
  - 2026 Indonesian Proliga with Jakarta LavAni

=== National team ===
- 2023 SEA Games
- 2023 SEA V.League Leg I
- 2023 SEA V.League Leg II
- 2024 SEA V.League Leg I
- 2024 SEA V.League Leg II
- 2025 SEA V.League Leg I
- 2025 SEA V.League Leg II
- 2025 SEA Games
- 2026 AVC Cup
- 2026 SEA V Cup Leg I
- 2026 SEA V Cup Leg II

=== Individual awards ===
- 2023 AVC Club Championship – Best Middle Blocker
- 2023 SEA V.League Leg I – Best Middle Blocker
- 2023 SEA V.League Leg II – Best Middle Blocker
- 2024 SEA V.League Leg I – Best Middle Blocker
- 2026 AVC Cup – Best Middle Blocker
- 2026 SEA V Cup Leg I – Best Middle Blocker

Awards
Preceded by (Pakistan) Musawer Khan (Qatar) Belal Abunabot	Best Middle Blocker of AVC Cup; 2026 ex aequo (South Korea) Park Chang-seong	Succeeded by TBD
