= 2024 SEA Men's V.League =

- Association: Southeast Asian Volleyball Association
- League: SEA V.League
- Sport: Volleyball
- Duration: 16–25 August 2024
- Matches: 6
- Teams: 4
- Total attendance: 9,700

First Leg
- Season champions: Thailand
- Runners-up: Indonesia
- Season MVP: (Thailand) Kissada Nilsawai

Second Leg
- Season champions: Thailand
- Runners-up: Indonesia
- Season MVP: (Thailand) Napadet Bhinijdee

Seasons
- ← 2023 2025 →

The 2024 SEA Men's V.League was the second edition of the SEA V.League, contested by four men's national teams that are the members of the Southeast Asian Volleyball Association (SAVA), the sport's regional governing body affiliated to Asian Volleyball Confederation (AVC).

The first leg was held in Manila, Philippines from 16 to 18 August while the second leg was held in Yogyakarta, Indonesia from 23 to 25 August.

== Teams ==
- Indonesia
- Philippines
- Thailand
- Vietnam

== Venues ==
First Leg	Second Leg
Manila, Philippines	Yogyakarta, Indonesia
Ninoy Aquino Stadium	UNY Sport Complex
Capacity: 6,000	Capacity: 5,000

== Pool standing procedure ==
1. Total number of victories (matches won, matches lost)
2. In the event of a tie, the following first tiebreaker was to apply: The teams was to be ranked by the most point gained per match as follows:
  - Match won 3–0 or 3–1: 3 points for the winner, 0 points for the loser
  - Match won 3–2: 2 points for the winner, 1 point for the loser
  - Match forfeited: 3 points for the winner, 0 points (0–25, 0–25, 0–25) for the loser

== First leg ==
=== Results ===
- All times are Philippine Standard Time (UTC+08:00).

Pos	Team	Pld	W	L	Pts	SW	SL	SR	SPW	SPL	SPR
1	Thailand	3	3	0	9	9	0	MAX	243	230	1.057
2	Indonesia	3	2	1	5	6	6	1.000	248	210	1.181
3	Philippines (H)	3	1	2	3	4	7	0.571	224	258	0.868
4	Vietnam	3	0	3	1	3	9	0.333	237	254	0.933

(H) Host

Date	Time		Score		Set 1	Set 2	Set 3	Set 4	Set 5	Total	Report
16 Aug	15:00	Indonesia	0–3	Thailand	21–25	23–25	20–25			64–75	P2
16 Aug	18:00	Philippines	3–1	Vietnam	25–21	25–22	18–25	25–23		93–91	P2
17 Aug	15:00	Thailand	3–0	Vietnam	27–25	29–27	25–15			81–67	P2
17 Aug	18:00	Indonesia	3–1	Philippines	23–25	25–19	25–11	25–21		98–76	P2
18 Aug	15:00	Indonesia	3–2	Vietnam	21–25	25–21	19–25	25–22	15–12	105–105	P2
18 Aug	18:00	Philippines	0–3	Thailand	26–28	15–25	16–25			57–78	P2

=== Final standing ===
Rank	Team
1st place, gold medalist(s)	Thailand
2nd place, silver medalist(s)	Indonesia
3rd place, bronze medalist(s)	Philippines
4	Vietnam

2024 SEA V.League – First Leg champions

Thailand
1st title

14–man roster
Prasert Pinkaew, Amornthep Konhan (c), Anut Promchan, Napadet Bhinijdee, Siwadon Sanhatham, Anuchit Pakdeekaew, Tanapat Charoensuk, Boonyarid Wongtorn, Supakorn Jenthaisong, Chayut Khongrueng, Anurak Phanram, Narongrit Janpirom, Kissada Nilsawai, Chaiwat Thungkham
Head coach
Park Ki-won

=== Awards ===
- Most valuable player
  Kissada Nilsawai (THA)
- Best setter
  Dio Zulfikri (INA)
- Best outside spikers
  Napadet Bhinijdee (THA)
  Michaelo Buddin (PHI)
- Best middle blockers
  Kim Malabunga (PHI)
  Hendra Kurniawan (INA)
- Best opposite spiker
  Phạm Văn Hiệp (VIE)
- Best libero
  Tanapat Charoensuk (THA)

== Second leg ==
=== Results ===
- All times are Western Indonesian Time (UTC+07:00).

Pos	Team	Pld	W	L	Pts	SW	SL	SR	SPW	SPL	SPR
1	Thailand	3	3	0	9	9	1	9.000	150	122	1.230
2	Indonesia (H)	3	2	1	5	7	5	1.400	191	156	1.224
3	Philippines	3	1	2	2	3	8	0.375	211	258	0.818
4	Vietnam	3	0	3	2	4	9	0.444	277	293	0.945

(H) Host

Date	Time		Score		Set 1	Set 2	Set 3	Set 4	Set 5	Total	Report
23 Aug	16:00	Thailand	3–0	Vietnam	25–22	25–22	25–20			75–64	
23 Aug	19:00	Indonesia	3–0	Philippines	26–24	25–11	25–15			76–50	
24 Aug	16:00	Vietnam	2–3	Indonesia	22–25	30–28	25–22	16–25	13–15	106–115	
24 Aug	19:00	Philippines	0–3	Thailand	18–25	21–25	19–25			58–75	
25 Aug	16:00	Vietnam	2–3	Philippines	25–27	25–14	25–22	21–25	11–15	107–103	
25 Aug	19:00	Indonesia	1–3	Thailand	20–25	24–26	25–22	26–28		95–101	

=== Final standing ===
Rank	Team
1st place, gold medalist(s)	Thailand
2nd place, silver medalist(s)	Indonesia
3rd place, bronze medalist(s)	Philippines
4	Vietnam

2024 SEA V.League – Second Leg champions

Thailand
2nd title

14–man roster
Prasert Pinkaew, Amornthep Konhan (c), Anut Promchan, Napadet Bhinijdee, Siwadon Sanhatham, Anuchit Pakdeekaew, Tanapat Charoensuk, Boonyarid Wongtorn, Supakorn Jenthaisong, Chayut Khongrueng, Anurak Phanram, Narongrit Janpirom, Kissada Nilsawai, Chaiwat Thungkham
Head coach
Park Ki-won

=== Awards ===
- Most valuable player
  Napadet Bhinijdee (THA)
- Best setter
  Dio Zulfikri (INA)
- Best outside spikers
  Michaelo Buddin (PHI)
  Farhan Halim (INA)
- Best middle blockers
  Kissada Nilsawai (THA)
  Trần Duy Tuyến (VIE)
- Best opposite spiker
  Napadet Bhinijdee (THA)
- Best libero
  Tanapat Charoensuk (THA)

== Results and combined standings ==
=== Combined standings ===
Pos	Team	Pld	W	L	Pts	SW	SL	SR	SPW	SPL	SPR
1	Thailand	6	6	0	18	18	1	18.000	494	447	1.105
2	Indonesia	6	4	2	10	13	11	1.182	534	467	1.143
3	Philippines	6	2	4	5	7	15	0.467	435	516	0.843
4	Vietnam	6	0	6	3	7	18	0.389	514	547	0.940

=== Summary ===
Leg	Date	Location	Champions	Runners-up	Third place	Purse ($)	Winner's share ($)
1	16–18 August 2024	(Philippines) Manila	Thailand (1)	Indonesia (1)	Philippines (1)	50,000	16,000
2	23–25 August 2024	(Indonesia) Yogyakarta	Thailand (2)	Indonesia (2)	Philippines (2)	50,000	16,000

== SEA V.League qualifier ==
Year	Remaining Teams				V.League Challenge Winner
2023	Indonesia	Philippines	Thailand	Vietnam	—N/a
2024	Indonesia	Philippines	Thailand	Vietnam	Cambodia

== See also ==
- 2024 SEA Women's V.League
- 2024 SEA V.League Challenge
