= Buds Buddin =

Filipino volleyball player (born 2001)

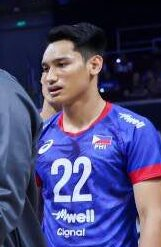
- Buddin in 2025

Personal information
- Nickname: Buds
- Nationality: Filipino
- Born: June 27, 2001 (age 25); Balabac, Palawan, Philippines
- Height: 1.86 m (6 ft 1 in)
- Weight: 72 kg (159 lb)
- Education: National University

Volleyball information
- Position: Outside hitter

Career
Years	Teams
2022	NU–Sta. Elena

National team
2023–present	Philippines
Honours
Men's volleyball
Representing Philippines
Southeast Asian Games
SEA V.League
Bronze medal – third place	2024 Manila	Team
Bronze medal – third place	2024 Yogyakarta	Team

Michaelo "Buds" Buddin (born June 27, 2001) is a Filipino volleyball player who plays for the NU Bulldogs in the University Athletic Association of the Philippines (UAAP) and the Philippine national team.

== Early life and education ==
Michaelo "Buds" Buddin was born on June 27, 2001, in Mangsee, Balabac, Palawan. He was raised in Balabac before moving to Puerto Princesa in his teenage years. Buddin took up volleyball and often played the sport barefooted in the streets. He only initially dreamt in playing in the Palarong Pambansa.

Buddin went to Manila to study at the NU Nazareth School for his high school studies before moving to its affiliate tertiary institution, the National University (NU).

== Career ==
=== Collegiate ===
Buddin plays for the NU Bulldogs in the University Athletic Association of the Philippines (UAAP). He first suit up for the NU-backed Sta. Elena team which took part in the 2022 Spikers' Turf Open Conference and guided by NU coach Dante Alinsunurin. NU–Sta. Elena won the tournament.

Buddin made his UAAP debut in Season 85 in 2023 with NU winning its third title. In Season 86, he incurred an right hand injury which rendered him unavailable for almost half of the season. He considered quitting volleyball due to his injury's effect in his mental health but eventually helped NU win their fourth title.

Buddin helped NU win its consecutive fifth title in UAAP Season 87 despite an ankle injury in May 2025.

=== National team ===
Buddin was a prospect for the Philippine national volleyball team but his injury in early 2024 led to his exclusion from the 2024 AVC Men's Challenge Cup.

Buddin eventually debuted for the Philippines in the first lege of the 2024 SEA Men's V.League in August. He helped the Philippines win two bronze medals. He was named Best Outside Hitter for both legs of the 2024 tournament series.

In 2025, Buddin featured in the Alas Pilipinas Invitationals. He also played in the 2025 FIVB Men's Volleyball World Championship in the Philippines.

== Personal life ==
Buddin is a Muslim.
