= 2025 SEA Men's V.League =

- Association: Southeast Asian Volleyball Association
- League: SEA V.League
- Sport: Volleyball
- Duration: 9–20 July
- Teams: 5

First Leg
- Season champions: Thailand
- Runners-up: Indonesia
- Season MVP: (Thailand) Amorntep Konhan

Second Leg
- Season champions: Indonesia
- Runners-up: Vietnam
- Season MVP: (Indonesia) Boy Arnez Arabi

Seasons
- ← 2024 2026 →

The 2025 SEA Men's V.League was the third edition of the SEA V.League, contested by five men's national teams that are the members of the Southeast Asian Volleyball Association (SAVA), the sport's regional governing body affiliated to Asian Volleyball Confederation (AVC). Cambodia was the fifth and newest team, having qualified via winning the 2024 SEA V.League Challenge.

The first leg was held in Candon, Ilocos Sur, the Philippines from 9 to 13 July, while the second leg was held in Jakarta, Indonesia from 16 to 20 July.

Following the combined standings of the tournament, Indonesia and Thailand, the top two teams qualified for the 2026 AVC Men's Volleyball Cup.

== Teams ==
- Cambodia
- Indonesia
- Philippines
- Thailand
- Vietnam

== Venues ==
| First Leg | Second Leg |
|---|---|
| Candon, Philippines | Jakarta, Indonesia |
| Candon City Arena | Jakarta International Velodrome |
| Capacity: 8,000 | Capacity: 3,500 |

== Pool standing procedure ==
1. Total number of victories (matches won, matches lost)
2. In the event of a tie, the following first tiebreaker will apply: The teams will be ranked by the most point gained per match as follows:
  - Match won 3–0 or 3–1: 3 points for the winner, 0 points for the loser
  - Match won 3–2: 2 points for the winner, 1 point for the loser
  - Match forfeited: 3 points for the winner, 0 points (0–25, 0–25, 0–25) for the loser
3. If teams are still tied after examining the number of victories and points gained, then the SAVA will examine the results in order to break the tie in the following order:
  - Set quotient: if two or more teams are tied on the number of points gained, they will be ranked by the quotient resulting from the division of the number of all set won by the number of all sets lost.
  - Points quotient: if the tie persists based on the set quotient, the teams will be ranked by the quotient resulting from the division of all points scored by the total of points lost during all sets.
  - If the tie persists based on the point quotient, the tie will be broken based on the team that won the match of the Round Robin Phase between the tied teams. When the tie in point quotient is between three or more teams, these teams ranked taking into consideration only the matches involving the teams in question.

== First leg ==
=== Results ===
- All times are Philippine Standard Time (UTC+08:00).

| Pos | Team | Pld | W | L | Pts | SW | SL | SR | SPW | SPL | SPR |
|---|---|---|---|---|---|---|---|---|---|---|---|
| 1 | Thailand | 4 | 3 | 1 | 9 | 10 | 4 | 2.500 | 339 | 311 | 1.090 |
| 2 | Indonesia | 4 | 3 | 1 | 8 | 10 | 5 | 2.000 | 348 | 311 | 1.119 |
| 3 | Vietnam | 4 | 2 | 2 | 7 | 8 | 7 | 1.143 | 335 | 340 | 0.985 |
| 4 | Philippines (H) | 4 | 2 | 2 | 5 | 6 | 8 | 0.750 | 310 | 321 | 0.966 |
| 5 | Cambodia | 4 | 0 | 4 | 1 | 2 | 12 | 0.167 | 296 | 345 | 0.858 |

Source: FIVB Live Center
(H) Host

| Date | Time | | Score | | Set 1 | Set 2 | Set 3 | Set 4 | Set 5 | Total | Report |
|---|---|---|---|---|---|---|---|---|---|---|---|
| 9 Jul | 15:00 | Thailand | 3–1 | Indonesia | 22–25 | 25–21 | 25–22 | 25–20 | | 97–88 | Report |
| 9 Jul | 18:00 | Philippines | 3–0 | Vietnam | 25–17 | 25–23 | 25–19 | | | 75–59 | Report |
| 10 Jul | 15:00 | Vietnam | 3–0 | Cambodia | 25–23 | 25–20 | 25–21 | | | 75–64 | Report |
| 10 Jul | 18:00 | Philippines | 0–3 | Thailand | 16–25 | 22–25 | 24–26 | | | 62–76 | Report |
| 11 Jul | 15:00 | Cambodia | 0–3 | Indonesia | 23–25 | 18–25 | 23–25 | | | 64–75 | Report |
| 11 Jul | 18:00 | Vietnam | 3–1 | Thailand | 29–31 | 25–22 | 25–18 | 25–20 | | 104–91 | Report |
| 12 Jul | 15:00 | Indonesia | 3–2 | Vietnam | 25–18 | 23–25 | 25–21 | 22–25 | 15–8 | 110–97 | Report |
| 12 Jul | 18:00 | Cambodia | 2–3 | Philippines | 21–25 | 27–25 | 30–32 | 25–23 | 8–15 | 111–120 | Report |
| 13 Jul | 15:00 | Thailand | 3–0 | Cambodia | 25–19 | 25–22 | 25–16 | | | 75–57 | Report |
| 13 Jul | 18:00 | Indonesia | 3–0 | Philippines | 25–19 | 25–17 | 25–17 | | | 75–53 | Report |

=== Final standing ===
| Rank | Team |
|---|---|
| 1st place, gold medalist(s) | Thailand |
| 2nd place, silver medalist(s) | Indonesia |
| 3rd place, bronze medalist(s) | Vietnam |
| 4 | Philippines |
| 5 | Cambodia |

2025 SEA V.League – First Leg champions

Thailand
3rd title

14–man roster
Nattapong Chachamnan, Prasert Pinkaew, Amorntep Konhan (c), Kissada Nilsawai, Toopadit Phraput, Tanapat Charoensuk, Suwit Mahasiriyothin, Boonyarid Wongtorn, Supakorn Jenthaisong, Kiadtiphum Ramsin, Anurak Phanram, Narongrit Janpirom, Warinthon Kamchoo, Chaiwat Thungkham
Head coach
(South Korea) Park Ki-won

=== Awards ===
The following awards were given.

- Most valuable player
  Amorntep Konhan (THA)
- Best setter
  Jasen Natanael Kilanta (INA)
- Best outside spikers
  Nguyễn Ngọc Thuân (VIE)
  Boy Arnez Arabi (INA)
- Best middle blockers
  Kissada Nilsawai (THA)
  Trần Duy Tuyến (VIE)
- Best opposite spiker
  Leo Ordiales (PHI)
- Best libero
  Tanapat Charoensuk (THA)

== Second leg ==
=== Results ===
- All times are Western Indonesia Time (UTC+07:00).

| Pos | Team | Pld | W | L | Pts | SW | SL | SR | SPW | SPL | SPR |
|---|---|---|---|---|---|---|---|---|---|---|---|
| 1 | Indonesia (H) | 4 | 4 | 0 | 10 | 12 | 5 | 2.400 | 391 | 341 | 1.147 |
| 2 | Vietnam | 4 | 3 | 1 | 8 | 10 | 6 | 1.667 | 351 | 342 | 1.026 |
| 3 | Thailand | 4 | 2 | 2 | 7 | 10 | 9 | 1.111 | 405 | 375 | 1.080 |
| 4 | Philippines | 4 | 1 | 3 | 5 | 8 | 10 | 0.800 | 372 | 390 | 0.954 |
| 5 | Cambodia | 4 | 0 | 4 | 0 | 2 | 12 | 0.167 | 275 | 346 | 0.795 |

Source: FIVB Live Center
(H) Host

| Date | Time | | Score | | Set 1 | Set 2 | Set 3 | Set 4 | Set 5 | Total | Report |
|---|---|---|---|---|---|---|---|---|---|---|---|
| 16 Jul | 16:00 | Cambodia | 0–3 | Vietnam | 23–25 | 19–25 | 21–25 | | | 63–75 | Report |
| 16 Jul | 19:00 | Philippines | 2–3 | Indonesia | 19–25 | 25–19 | 25–21 | 22–25 | 8–15 | 99–105 | Report |
| 17 Jul | 16:00 | Cambodia | 1–3 | Thailand | 14–25 | 13–25 | 25–23 | 15–25 | | 67–98 | Report |
| 17 Jul | 19:00 | Vietnam | 1–3 | Indonesia | 18–25 | 25–22 | 22–25 | 15–25 | | 80–97 | Report |
| 18 Jul | 16:00 | Philippines | 3–1 | Cambodia | 25–23 | 25–22 | 23–25 | 25–18 | | 98–88 | Report |
| 18 Jul | 19:00 | Thailand | 2–3 | Vietnam | 19–25 | 25–16 | 21–25 | 25–19 | 11–15 | 101–100 | Report |
| 19 Jul | 16:00 | Thailand | 3–2 | Philippines | 18–25 | 18–25 | 25–14 | 25–23 | 15–7 | 101–94 | Report |
| 19 Jul | 19:00 | Indonesia | 3–0 | Cambodia | 25–21 | 25–14 | 25–22 | | | 75–57 | Report |
| 20 Jul | 16:00 | Vietnam | 3–1 | Philippines | 25–23 | 21–25 | 25–17 | 25–16 | | 96–81 | Report |
| 20 Jul | 19:00 | Indonesia | 3–2 | Thailand | 27–29 | 25–15 | 25–23 | 22–25 | 15–13 | 114–105 | Report |

=== Final standing ===
| Rank | Team |
|---|---|
| 1st place, gold medalist(s) | Indonesia |
| 2nd place, silver medalist(s) | Vietnam |
| 3rd place, bronze medalist(s) | Thailand |
| 4 | Philippines |
| 5 | Cambodia |

2025 SEA V.League – Second Leg champions

Indonesia
3rd title

14–man roster
Boy Arnez Arabi, Hendra Kurniawan, Prasojo, Jasen Natanael Kilanta (c), Rama Fazza Fauzan, Fahry Septian Putratama, Rivan Nurmulki, Irpan, Farhan Halim, Tedi Oka Syahputra, Muhammad Ega Yuri Pradana, Alfin Daniel Pratama, Agil Angga Anggara, Cep Indra Agustin
Head coach
(China) Jiang Jie

=== Awards ===
The following awards were given.

- Most valuable player
  Boy Arnez Arabi (INA)
- Best setter
  Jasen Natanael Kilanta (INA)
- Best outside spikers
  Nguyễn Ngọc Thuân (VIE)
  Boy Arnez Arabi (INA)
- Best middle blockers
  Kissada Nilsawai (THA)
  Trần Duy Tuyến (VIE)
- Best opposite spiker
  Rivan Nurmulki (INA)
- Best libero
  Joshua Ybañez (PHI)

== Results and combined standings ==
=== Combined standings ===
| Pos | Team | Pld | W | L | Pts | SW | SL | SR | SPW | SPL | SPR | Qualification |
|---|---|---|---|---|---|---|---|---|---|---|---|---|
| 1 | Indonesia | 8 | 7 | 1 | 18 | 22 | 10 | 2.200 | 739 | 652 | 1.133 | 2026 AVC Cup |
| 2 | Thailand | 8 | 5 | 3 | 16 | 20 | 13 | 1.538 | 744 | 686 | 1.085 | 2026 AVC Cup |
| 3 | Vietnam | 8 | 5 | 3 | 15 | 18 | 13 | 1.385 | 686 | 682 | 1.006 | |
| 4 | Philippines | 8 | 3 | 5 | 10 | 14 | 18 | 0.778 | 682 | 711 | 0.959 | |
| 5 | Cambodia | 8 | 0 | 8 | 1 | 4 | 24 | 0.167 | 571 | 691 | 0.826 | |

Source: FIVB Live Center

=== Summary ===
| Leg | Date | Location | Champions | Runners-up | Third place | Purse ($) | Winner's share ($) |
|---|---|---|---|---|---|---|---|
| 1 | 9–13 July 2025 | (Philippines) Candon | Thailand (3) | Indonesia (3) | Vietnam (2) | 55,000 | 13,000 |
| 2 | 16–20 July 2025 | (Indonesia) Jakarta | Indonesia (3) | Vietnam (2) | Thailand (2) | 55,000 | 13,000 |

== See also ==
- 2025 SEA Women's V.League
