= Kitakyushu City General Gymnasium =

Arena in Kitakyushu, Fukuoka, Japan

Coordinates: 33°52′29.4″N 130°50′26.3″E

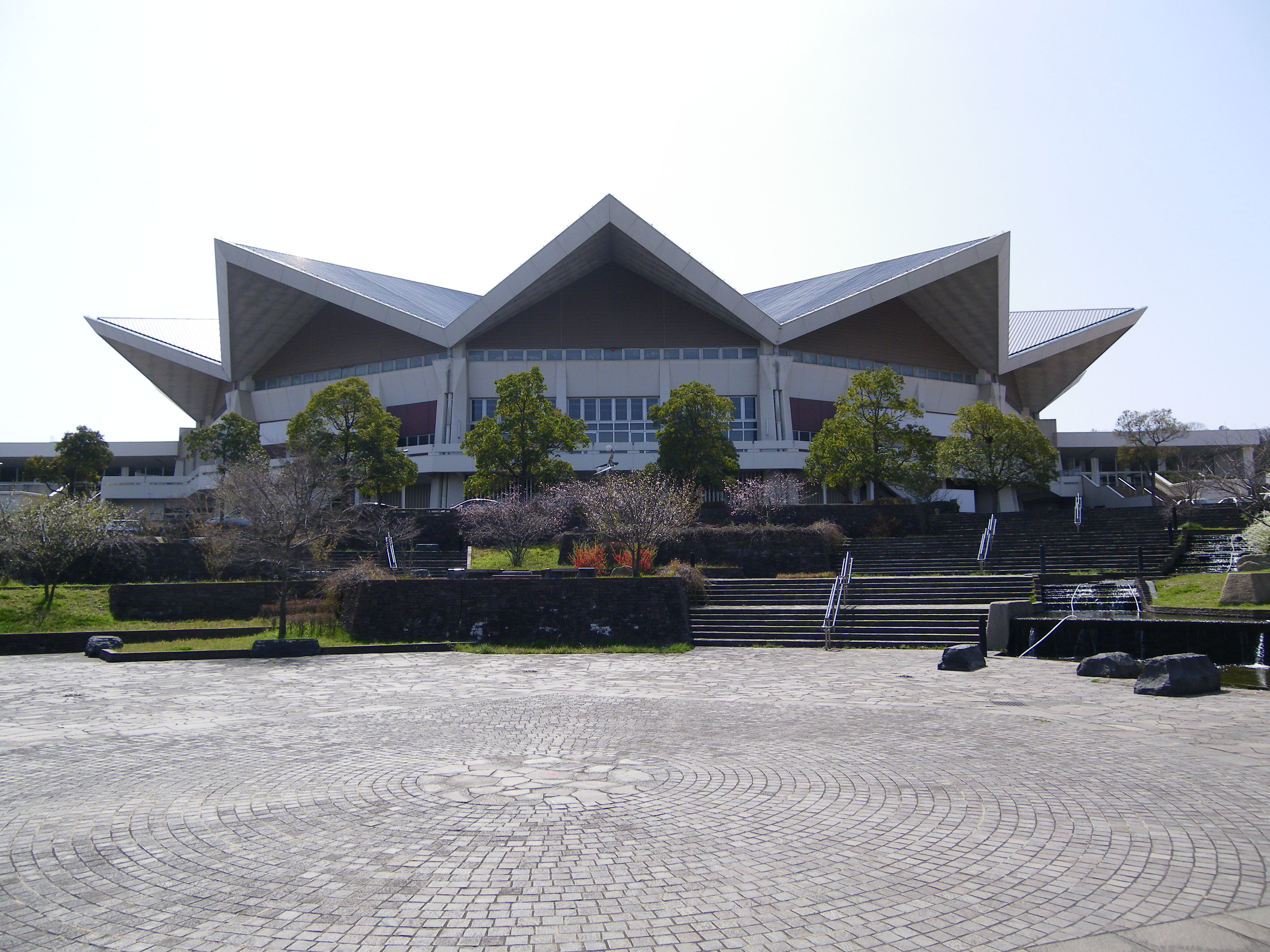
- Interactive map of Kitakyushu City General Gymnasium
- Full name: Kitakyushu City General Gymnasium
- Location: Yahatahigashi-ku, Kitakyushu, Fukuoka Prefecture, Japan
- Owner: Kitakyushu City
- Operator: Kitakyushu City
- Capacity: 10,000

Construction
- Opened: January 12, 1974
- Architect: Yamashita Sekkei Inc.

Tenants
- BORK Bullet Kitakyushu (futsal); 2021 World Artistic Gymnastics Championships

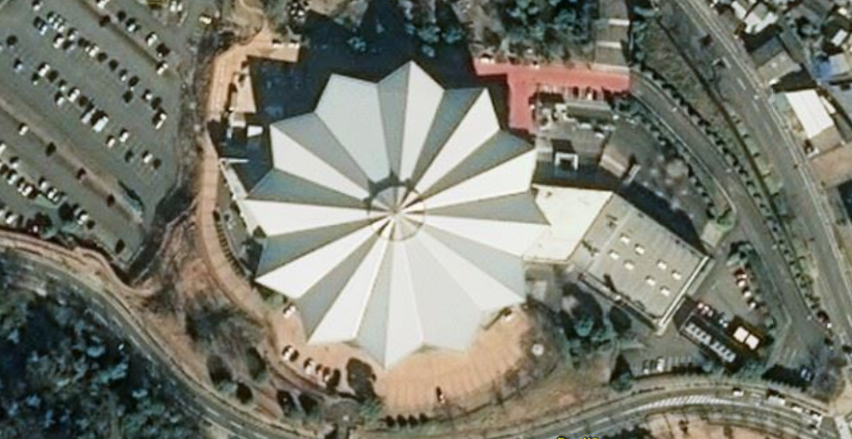
Aerial photo

Kitakyushu City General Gymnasium is an arena in Yahatahigashi-ku, Kitakyushu, Fukuoka Prefecture, Japan.
