= Volleyball at the 1983 SEA Games =

- Dates: 29 May – 4 June 1983

The volleyball competitions at the 1983 SEA Games in the Singapore were held from 29 May to 4 June 1983.

== Medal winners ==
Event	Gold	Silver	Bronze
Men's	Myanmar (MYA)	Indonesia (INA)	Philippines (PHI)
Women's	Indonesia (INA)	Philippines (PHI)	Malaysia (MAS)

== Men's tournament ==
=== Preliminary round ===
Pos	Team	Pld	W	L	Pts	SW	SL	SR	SPW	SPL	SPR
1	Singapore	3	3	0	6	9	3	3.000	0	0	—
2	Philippines	3	2	1	5	8	4	2.000	0	0	—
3	Malaysia	3	1	2	4	5	6	0.833	0	0	—
4	Brunei	3	0	3	3	0	9	0.000	0	0	—

May 29, 1983
Results	Philippines	3–1	Malaysia
	Singapore	3–0	Brunei
May 31, 1983
Results	Singapore	3–1	Malaysia
	Philippines	3–0	Brunei
June 1, 1983
Results	Malaysia	3–0	Brunei
	Singapore	3–2	Philippines

Pos	Team	Pld	W	L	Pts	SW	SL	SR	SPW	SPL	SPR
1	Burma	3	3	0	6	9	1	9.000	0	0	—
2	Indonesia	3	2	1	5	6	5	1.200	0	0	—
3	Thailand	3	1	2	4	5	6	0.833	0	0	—
4	Cambodia	3	0	3	3	0	9	0.000	0	0	—

May 30, 1983
Results	Indonesia	3–0	Cambodia
	Burma	3–1	Thailand
June 1, 1983
Results	Burma	3–0	Cambodia
	Indonesia	3–1	Thailand
June 2, 1983
Results	Thailand	3–0	Cambodia
	Burma	3–0	Indonesia

=== Final round ===
Semifinals
3 June
Indonesia	3
Singapore	0
3 June
Burma	3
Philippines	0

Gold medal match
4 June
Indonesia	0
Burma	3
Bronze medal match
4 June
Singapore	0
Philippines	3

==== Semi-finals ====
Date		Score		Set 1	Set 2	Set 3	Set 4	Set 5	Total	Report
3 Jun	Indonesia	3–1	Singapore	15–6	15–2	15–4			45–12	Results
3 Jun	Burma	3–1	Philippines	15–4	15–6	13–15	15–3		58–28	Results

==== 7th place match ====
Date		Score		Set 1	Set 2	Set 3	Set 4	Set 5	Total	Report
4 Jun	Brunei	3–0	Cambodia	15–8	15–4	16–14			46–26	Results

==== 5th place match ====
Date		Score		Set 1	Set 2	Set 3	Set 4	Set 5	Total	Report
4 Jun	Thailand	3–0	Malaysia	15–12	15–10	16–8			45–30	Results

==== Bronze medal match ====
Date		Score		Set 1	Set 2	Set 3	Set 4	Set 5	Total	Report
4 Jun	Philippines	3–0	Singapore	15–10	15–5	15–6			45–21	Results

==== Gold medal match ====
Date		Score		Set 1	Set 2	Set 3	Set 4	Set 5	Total	Report
4 Jun	Burma	3–0	Indonesia	15–11	15–13	15–12			45–36	Results

=== Final standing ===
Rank	Team	Pld	W	L
1st place, gold medalist(s)	Burma	5	5	0
2nd place, silver medalist(s)	Indonesia	5	3	2
3rd place, bronze medalist(s)	Philippines	5	3	2
4	Singapore	5	3	2
5	Thailand	4	2	2
6	Malaysia	4	1	3
7	Brunei	4	1	3
8	Cambodia	4	0	4

== Women's tournament ==
=== Results ===
Date		Score		Set 1	Set 2	Set 3	Set 4	Set 5	Total	Report
29 May	Philippines	3–0	Malaysia							Results
30 May	Malaysia	3–1	Singapore							Results
31 May	Indonesia	3–0	Thailand							Results
1 Jun	Philippines	3–0	Singapore							Results
2 Jun	Indonesia	3–0	Malaysia							Results
2 Jun	Thailand	3–2	Singapore							Results

=== Gold Medal match ===
Date		Score		Set 1	Set 2	Set 3	Set 4	Set 5	Total	Report
3 Jun	Indonesia	3–2	Philippines	15–3	8–15	5–15	15–5	15–5	58–43	Results

=== Final standing ===
Rank	Team
1st place, gold medalist(s)	Indonesia
2nd place, silver medalist(s)	Philippines
3rd place, bronze medalist(s)	Malaysia
4	Thailand
5	Singapore
