= Candon City Arena =

Indoor arena in Candon, Ilocos Sur, Philippines

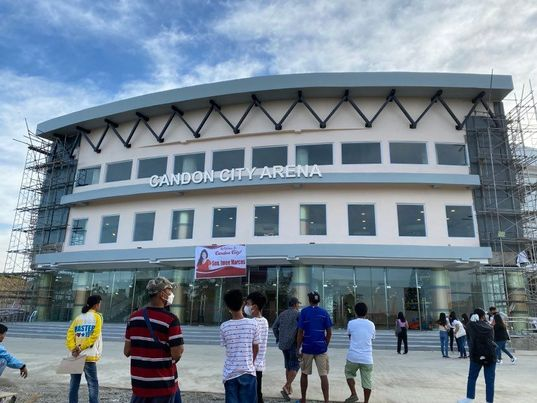
- Candon City Arena under construction in December 2022
- Interactive map of Candon City Arena
- Location: Candon, Ilocos Sur, Philippines
- Coordinates: 17°12′16″N 120°27′24″E
- Capacity: 8,000

Construction
- Opened: 2023

Tenants
- Philippine Basketball Association (out-of-town games); Premier Volleyball League (Tour games)

Candon City Arena is an indoor arena located in Candon, Ilocos Sur, Philippines. The arena opened in 2023 and has a seating capacity of 8,000. The arena has hosted various sporting events, including out-of-town games of the Philippine Basketball Association and Premier Volleyball League, as well as concerts.

== History ==
The arena opened in 2023 and hosted its first sporting event on October 27, when the Premier Volleyball League hosted a doubleheader of games with the F2 Logistics Cargo Movers beating the Galeries Tower Highrisers in the first game, and the Petro Gazz Angels beating the Nxled Chameleons in the second.

On April 13, 2024, it then hosted its first Philippine Basketball Association game, which saw the TNT Tropang Giga beat the NLEX Road Warriors, 104–101. The most recent game at the venue was held on January 18, 2025 between the San Miguel Beermen and Meralco Bolts.

On October 5, 2024, the arena hosted its first concert as the culminating event of Candon Festival 2024. Among the performers at the concert were bands Ben&Ben and Parokya ni Edgar, and rapper Flow G.

In January 2025, the Overseas Workers Welfare Administration opened a new office at the arena.

From July 9 to 13, 2025, the arena hosted the first leg of the 2025 SEA Men's V.League.

On March 6 and 8, 2026, the arena hosted the 2026 PBA All-Star Weekend. On May 1, it will also host the 2026 Volleyball All-Star Showcase co-hosted by the PVL and Spikers' Turf.

From June 6 to 14, 2026, the arena hosted the 2026 AVC Women's Volleyball Nations Cup.

== Events ==
=== PBA out-of-town games ===
| Date | Winning team | Result | Losing team | Ref. |
|---|---|---|---|---|
| April 13, 2024 | TNT Tropang Giga | 104–101 | NLEX Road Warriors | |
| August 24, 2024 | Rain or Shine Elasto Painters | 73–64 | Barangay Ginebra San Miguel | |
| January 18, 2025 | Meralco Bolts | 100–93 | San Miguel Beermen | |
| May 24, 2025 | Magnolia Chicken Timplados Hotshots | 106–97 | NorthPort Batang Pier | |
| March 6, 2026 (2026 All-Star Weekend) | Rookies and Sophomores | 154–150 | Juniors | |
| March 8, 2026 (2026 All-Star Weekend) | North All-Stars | 147–142 | South All-Stars | |

=== PVL on Tour games ===
| Date | Winning team | Result | Losing team | Ref. |
|---|---|---|---|---|
| October 27, 2023 | F2 Logistics Cargo Movers | 3–0 | Galeries Tower Highrisers | |
| October 27, 2023 | Petro Gazz Angels | 3–0 | Nxled Chameleons | |
| November 23, 2024 | Petro Gazz Angels | 3–0 | Farm Fresh Foxies | |
| November 23, 2024 | Creamline Cool Smashers | 3–0 | Akari Chargers | |
| May 1, 2026 (2026 All-Star Showcase) | Team Heart vs. Team Hustle | | | |

Events and tenants
| Preceded by La Salle Coliseum | Host of the PBA All-Star Game; 2026 | Succeeded by TBA (Cagayan de Oro) |
| Preceded by Filoil Flying V Centre | Host of the Volleyball All-Star Showcase; 2026 | Succeeded by TBA |
