= Jakarta International Velodrome =

Velodrome in East Jakarta, Indonesia

- Rawamangun Velodrome
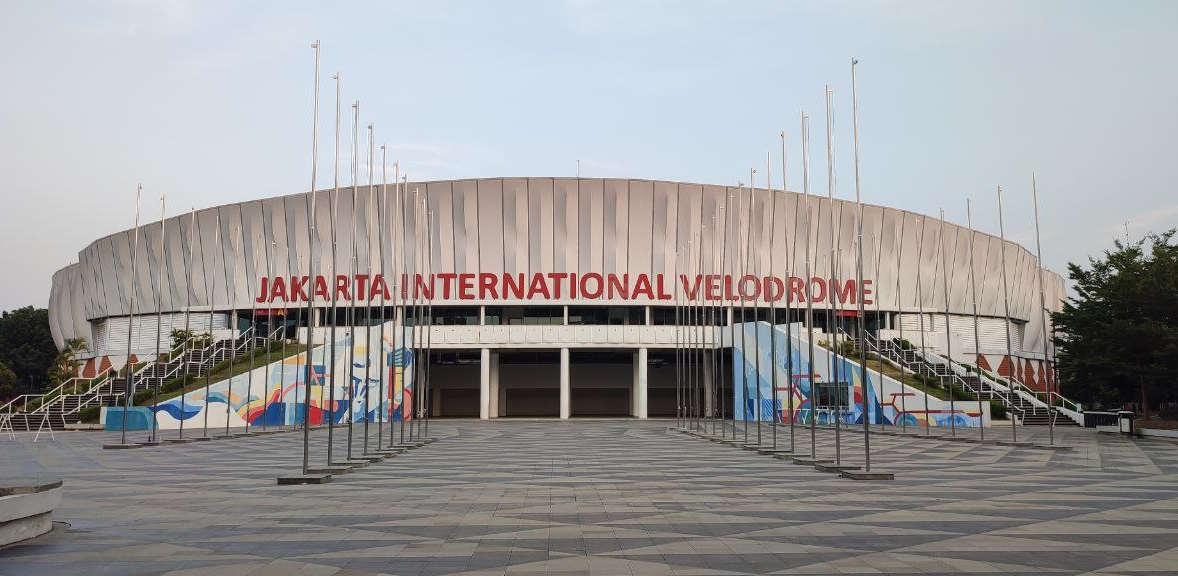
- Interactive map of Jakarta International Velodrome
- Location: Rawamangun, Pulogadung, East Jakarta, Jakarta, Indonesia
- Coordinates: 6.191085°S 106.890227°E
- Owner: Jakarta SCR Government
- Operator: PT Jakarta Propertindo
- Capacity: 3,500 (track cycling); 8,500 (concerts)
- Surface: Wood
- Field size: 250 m (270 yd) track
- Public transit: Velodrome or Pemuda Rawamangun; Velodrome

Construction
- Opened: 1973; 53 years ago
- Renovated: 2016–2018
- Cost: US$ 40 million
- Architects: Cox Architects and BKM Indonesia
- Project manager: PT Wijaya Karya
- Structural engineer: Mott MacDonald
- Main contractor: ES Global

Jakarta International Velodrome is a sporting facility located at Rawamangun, East Jakarta, Indonesia. The velodrome was built by ES Global Ltd working with local construction company Wika. The arena was used as a venue for 2018 Asian Games and 2018 Asian Para Games. The Velodrome covers an area of about 9.5 hectares. The sports arena has a 250 m cycling track, designed by Schuermann Architects, tennis court and swimming pools. The velodrome has a seating capacity of 3,500 for track cycling, and up to 8,500 for shows and concerts. Although made for cycling races, the complex will also be used for various sports activities such as volleyball, badminton, and futsal. The velodrome is certified as “Class 1” by the Union Cycliste Internationale (UCI).

== History ==
The original venue was built in 1973 and demolished to make way for the modern velodrome. Previously, the old velodrome was used as the venue for the 2011 Southeast Asian Games. The old velodrome was outdoor and classified as national standard, but after renovation the cycling venue has transformed into international standard indoor velodrome and certified by UCI. In February 2023, the velodrome hosted the first event of UCI Track Cycling Nations Cup.

== Transportation ==
Jakarta International Velodrome is accessible by public transport from the Velodrome station of LRT Jakarta and from Velodrome or Pemuda Rawamangun stops of Transjakarta Corridor 4. Feeder buses of Transjakarta also have two stops near the velodrome on 4C and 4K routes.

== Sporting events ==
Since the renovation, the velodrome had hosted several international sporting events:

- Track cycling events of 2018 Asian Games and 2018 Asian Para Games
- 2023 UCI Track Cycling Nations Cup
- 2025 SEA Men's V.League (second leg)
- 2026 AFC Futsal Asian Cup
- 2026 SEA Men's V Cup (second leg)

== Gallery ==
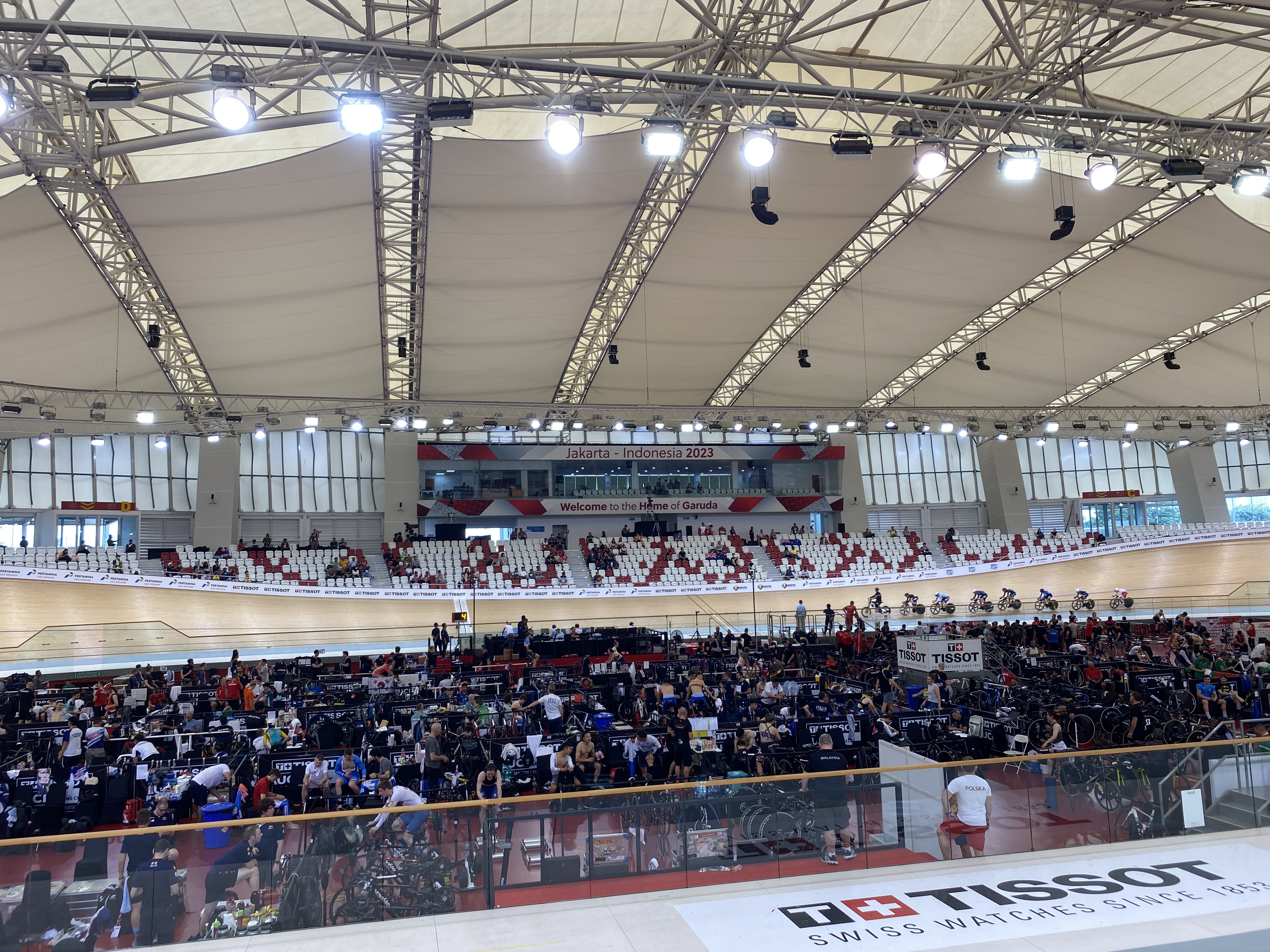
2023 UCI Track Nations Cup

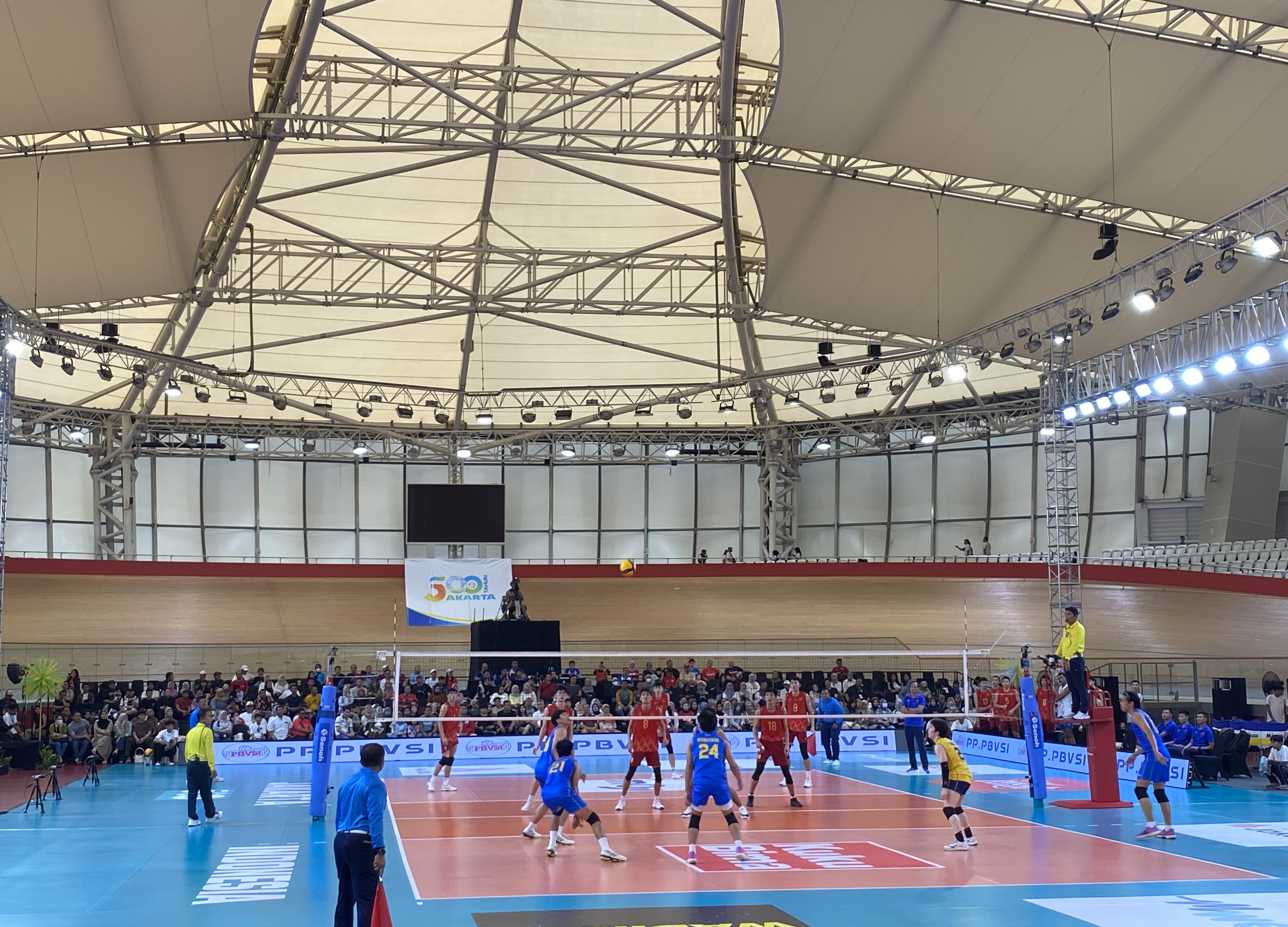
2025 SEA V.League Men's Leg 2

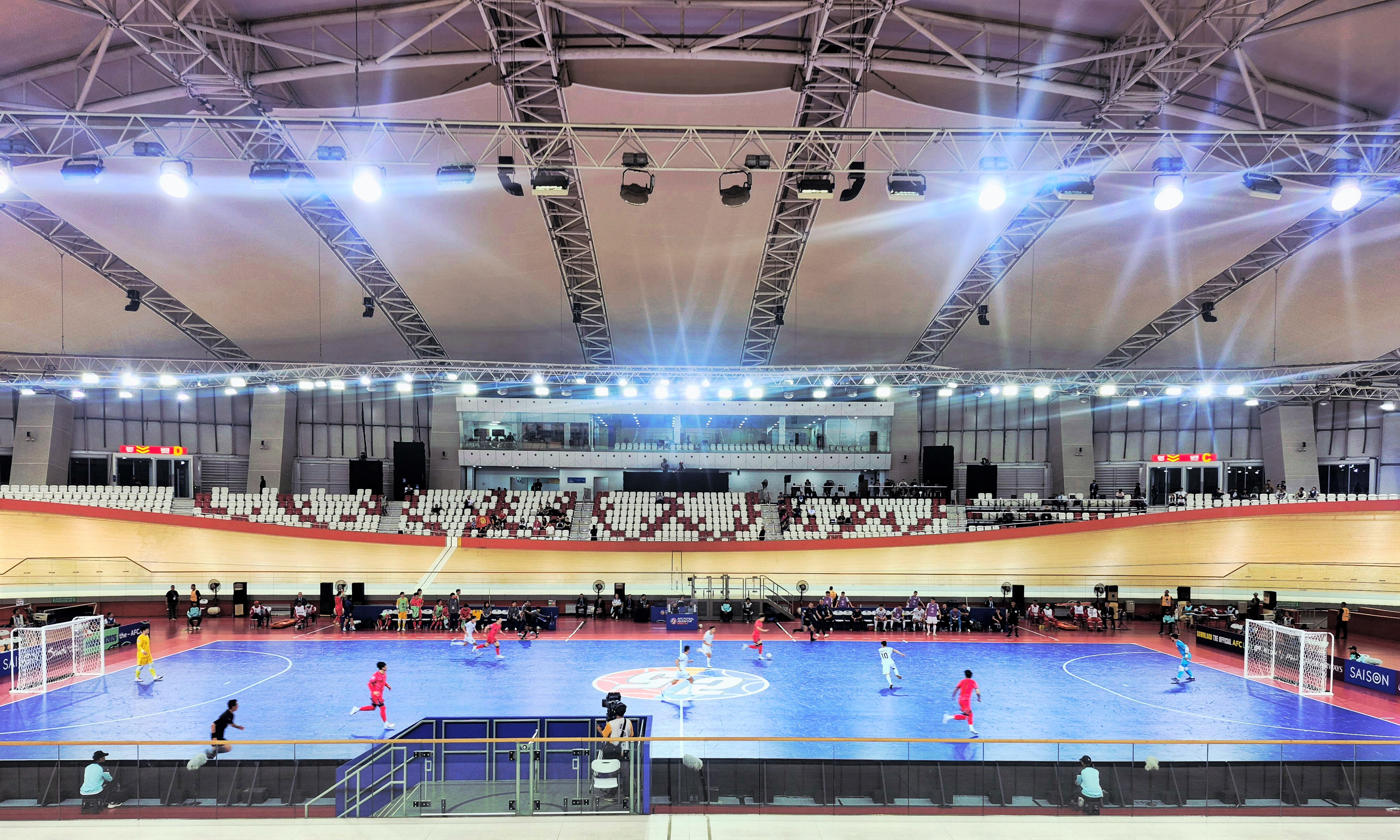
2026 AFC Futsal Asian Cup

== See also ==
- List of cycling tracks and velodromes
