= Volleyball at the 2018 Asian Games =

- Venue: Gelora Bung Karno Tennis Indoor; Bulungan Sports Hall
- Dates: 19 August – 1 September 2018
- Competitors: 417 from 21 nations

Volleyball at the 2018 Asian Games was held in two venues in Indonesia. All matches were held at the GBK Tennis Indoor and the Bulungan Sports Hall, Jakarta.

== Schedule ==
| P | Preliminary round | C | Classification | R | Round of 16 | ¼ | Quarterfinals | ½ | Semifinals | F | Finals |

| Event↓/Date → | 19th Sun | 20th Mon | 21st Tue | 22nd Wed | 23rd Thu | 24th Fri | 25th Sat | 26th Sun | 27th Mon | 28th Tue | 29th Wed | 30th Thu | 31st Fri | 1st Sat |
|---|---|---|---|---|---|---|---|---|---|---|---|---|---|---|
| Men | | P | | P | P | P | P | R | | ¼ | | ½ | C | F |
| Women | P | | P | | P | | P | | P | | ¼ | | ½ | F |

== Medalists ==
| Event | Gold | Silver | Bronze |
|---|---|---|---|
| Men | Iran; Milad Ebadipour; Saman Faezi; Saeid Marouf; Farhad Ghaemi; Mohammad Mousavi; Amir Ghafour; Saber Kazemi; Mohammad Javad Manavinejad; Ali Shafiei; Mohammad Taher Vadi; Mehdi Marandi; Morteza Sharifi; Mohammad Reza Hazratpour; Amir Hossein Toukhteh | South Korea; Song Myung-geun; Han Sun-soo; Seo Jae-duck; Jeong Min-su; Bu Yong-chan; Lee Min-gyu; Kim Kyu-min; Na Gyeong-bok; Kwak Seung-suk; Jung Ji-seok; Choi Min-ho; Jeon Kwang-in; Moon Sung-min; Kim Jae-hwi | Chinese Taipei; Lin Cheng-yang; Liu Hong-jie; Li Chia-hsuan; Huang Shih-hao; Tai Ju-chien; Liu Hung-min; Su Hou-chen; Wu Tsung-hsuan; Hsu Mei-chung; Huang Chien-feng; Lin Yi-huei; Wang Chien-pin; Shih Hsiu-chih; Chen Chien-chen |
| Women | China; Yuan Xinyue; Zhu Ting; Hu Mingyuan; Gong Xiangyu; Zeng Chunlei; Liu Xiaotong; Yao Di; Li Yingying; Diao Linyu; Lin Li; Ding Xia; Yan Ni; Wang Mengjie; Duan Fang | Thailand; Piyanut Pannoy; Pornpun Guedpard; Thatdao Nuekjang; Pleumjit Thinkaow; Onuma Sittirak; Hattaya Bamrungsuk; Wilavan Apinyapong; Nootsara Tomkom; Chitaporn Kamlangmak; Malika Kanthong; Pimpichaya Kokram; Ajcharaporn Kongyot; Chatchu-on Moksri; Supattra Pairoj | South Korea; Park Eun-jin; Lee Ju-ah; Jung Ho-young; Hwang Min-kyoung; Lee Hyo-hee; Yim Myung-ok; Kim Yeon-koung; Kim Su-ji; Park Jeong-ah; Yang Hyo-jin; Kang So-hwi; Lee Jae-yeong; Lee Da-yeong; Na Hyun-jung |

== Medal table ==
| Rank | Nation | Gold | Silver | Bronze | Total |
|---|---|---|---|---|---|
| 1 | China (CHN) | 1 | 0 | 0 | 1 |
| 1 | Iran (IRI) | 1 | 0 | 0 | 1 |
| 3 | South Korea (KOR) | 0 | 1 | 1 | 2 |
| 4 | Thailand (THA) | 0 | 1 | 0 | 1 |
| 5 | Chinese Taipei (TPE) | 0 | 0 | 1 | 1 |
| Totals (5 entries) | | 2 | 2 | 2 | 6 |

== Draw ==
The official draw for both the men's volleyball events were held on 5 July 2018 in Jakarta.

=== Men ===
The teams were distributed according to their position at the 2014 Asian Games using the serpentine system for their distribution.

Pool A

- Indonesia (Host)
- Saudi Arabia (12)
- Kyrgyzstan

Pool B

- Iran (1)
- Pakistan (11)
- Mongolia

Pool C

- Japan (2)
- Kazakhstan (10)
- Myanmar

Pool D

- South Korea (3)
- Chinese Taipei (9)
- Nepal

Pool E

- China (4)
- Thailand (7)
- Sri Lanka
- Vietnam

Pool F

- India (5)
- Qatar (6)
- Maldives
- Hong Kong

=== Women ===
The teams were distributed according to their position at the 2014 Asian Games using the serpentine system for their distribution.

Pool A

- Indonesia (Host)
- Thailand (3)
- Japan (4)
- Hong Kong (7)
- Philippines

Pool B

- South Korea (1)
- China (2)
- Chinese Taipei (5)
- Kazakhstan (6)
- Vietnam
- India

== Final standing ==
=== Men ===
| Rank | Team | Pld | W | L |
|---|---|---|---|---|
| 1st place, gold medalist(s) | Iran | 5 | 5 | 0 |
| 2nd place, silver medalist(s) | South Korea | 6 | 5 | 1 |
| 3rd place, bronze medalist(s) | Chinese Taipei | 5 | 3 | 2 |
| 4 | Qatar | 7 | 5 | 2 |
| 5 | Japan | 5 | 4 | 1 |
| 6 | Indonesia | 5 | 2 | 3 |
| 7 | Thailand | 7 | 5 | 2 |
| 8 | Pakistan | 6 | 3 | 3 |
| 9 | China | 6 | 3 | 3 |
| 10 | Saudi Arabia | 5 | 2 | 3 |
| 11 | Myanmar | 5 | 2 | 3 |
| 12 | India | 6 | 2 | 4 |
| 13 | Sri Lanka | 6 | 4 | 2 |
| 14 | Vietnam | 6 | 3 | 3 |
| 15 | Nepal | 5 | 2 | 3 |
| 16 | Kyrgyzstan | 5 | 1 | 4 |
| 17 | Kazakhstan | 4 | 1 | 3 |
| 18 | Mongolia | 4 | 0 | 4 |
| 19 | Hong Kong | 5 | 2 | 3 |
| 20 | Maldives | 5 | 0 | 5 |

=== Women ===
| Rank | Team | Pld | W | L |
|---|---|---|---|---|
| 1st place, gold medalist(s) | China | 8 | 8 | 0 |
| 2nd place, silver medalist(s) | Thailand | 7 | 6 | 1 |
| 3rd place, bronze medalist(s) | South Korea | 8 | 6 | 2 |
| 4 | Japan | 7 | 4 | 3 |
| 5 | Kazakhstan | 8 | 4 | 4 |
| 6 | Vietnam | 8 | 3 | 5 |
| 7 | Indonesia | 7 | 3 | 4 |
| 8 | Philippines | 7 | 1 | 6 |
| 9 | Chinese Taipei | 6 | 3 | 3 |
| 10 | India | 7 | 1 | 6 |
| 11 | Hong Kong | 5 | 0 | 5 |
