= Volleyball at the 2022 Asian Games =

- Venue: China Textile City Sports Centre Gymnasium; Linping Sports Centre Gymnasium; Deqing Sports Centre Gymnasium; HNU Cangqian Gymnasium
- Dates: 19 September – 7 October 2023
- Competitors: 381 from 21 nations

Volleyball events at the 2022 Asian Games for men and women were held in four venues in Zhejiang, China, from 19 September to 7 October 2023.

== Schedule ==
P	Preliminary round	S	Second round	¼	Quarterfinals	½	Semifinals	F	Finals

Event↓/Date →	19th Tue	20th Wed	21st Thu	22nd Fri	23rd Sat	24th Sun	25th Mon	26th Tue	27th Wed	28th Thu	29th Fri	30th Sat	1st Sun	2nd Mon	3rd Tue	4th Wed	5th Thu	6th Fri	7th Sat
Men	P	P	P	S		¼	½	F											
Women												P	P	P		S	S	½	F

== Medalists ==
Event	Gold	Silver	Bronze
Men	Iran; Mehdi Jelveh; Mohammad Mousavi; Mohammad Reza Hazratpour; Amin Esmaeilnejad; Saber Kazemi; Amir Hossein Esfandiar; Javad Karimi; Meisam Salehi; Mohammad Taher Vadi; Pouria Khanzadeh; Shahrouz Homayounfarmanesh; Mohammad Valizadeh	China; Wang Dongchen; Jiang Chuan; Wang Hebin; Yu Yuantai; Yu Yaochen; Li Yongzhen; Peng Shikun; Qu Zongshuai; Zhang Guanhua; Zhang Jingyin; Wang Bin; Dai Qingyao	Japan; Akihiro Fukatsu; Kenta Takanashi; Masahiro Yanagida; Hiroto Nishiyama; Kazuyuki Takahashi; Takahiro Namba; Akito Yamazaki; Keihan Takahashi; Kento Asano; Yudai Arai; Hirohito Kashimura
Women	China; Yuan Xinyue; Diao Linyu; Gao Yi; Gong Xiangyu; Wang Yuanyuan; Wang Yunlu; Zhong Hui; Li Yingying; Zheng Yixin; Ding Xia; Wang Mengjie; Wu Mengjie	Japan; Koyomi Iwasaki; Haruyo Shimamura; Yuka Sato; Yuka Meguro; Minami Uesaka; Mizuki Tanaka; Miwako Osanai; Erina Ogawa; Miyu Nakagawa; Tsukasa Nakagawa; Yuki Nishikawa; Shion Hirayama	Thailand; Wipawee Srithong; Piyanut Pannoy; Pornpun Guedpard; Thatdao Nuekjang; Hattaya Bamrungsuk; Pimpichaya Kokram; Sasipaporn Janthawisut; Ajcharaporn Kongyot; Chatchu-on Moksri; Thanacha Sooksod; Sirima Manakij; Jarasporn Bundasak

== Medal table ==
Rank	Nation	Gold	Silver	Bronze	Total
1	China (CHN)	1	1	0	2
2	Iran (IRI)	1	0	0	1
3	Japan (JPN)	0	1	1	2
4	Thailand (THA)	0	0	1	1
Totals (4 entries)		2	2	2	6

== Draw ==
The official draw for both volleyball events were held on 27 July 2023 in Hangzhou.

=== Men ===
The teams were distributed according to their position at the 2018 Asian Games, for Pot 1 and Pot 2 teams, the serpentine system was used for their distribution, while China, as host, was assigned to Pool A.

Pool A

- China (Host)
- Kyrgyzstan (16)
- Kazakhstan

Pool B

- Iran (1)
- Nepal (15)
- Bahrain

Pool C

- South Korea (2)
- India (12)
- Cambodia

Pool D

- Chinese Taipei (3)
- Pakistan (8)
- Mongolia

Pool E

- Qatar (4)
- Thailand (7)
- Hong Kong

Pool F

- Japan (5)
- Indonesia (6)
- Philippines
- Afghanistan

=== Women ===
The teams were distributed according to their position at the 2018 Asian Games. For Pot 1 and Pot 2 teams, the serpentine system was used for their distribution.

Pool A

- China (Host)
- India (10)
- North Korea

Pool B

- Thailand (2)
- Chinese Taipei (9)
- Mongolia

Pool C

- South Korea (3)
- Vietnam (6)
- Nepal

Pool D

- Japan (4)
- Kazakhstan (5)
- Afghanistan
- Hong Kong

== Final standing ==
=== Men ===
Rank	Team	Pld	W	L
1st place, gold medalist(s)	Iran	5	5	0
2nd place, silver medalist(s)	China	5	4	1
3rd place, bronze medalist(s)	Japan	7	6	1
4	Qatar	6	4	2
5	Pakistan	5	4	1
6	India	5	3	2
7	South Korea	6	4	2
8	Indonesia	6	3	3
9	Kazakhstan	6	3	3
10	Thailand	5	1	4
11	Chinese Taipei	5	2	3
12	Bahrain	5	1	4
13	Cambodia	2	0	2
13	Hong Kong	2	0	2
13	Kyrgyzstan	2	0	2
13	Mongolia	2	0	2
13	Nepal	2	0	2
13	Philippines	3	1	2
19	Afghanistan	3	0	3

=== Women ===
Rank	Team	Pld	W	L
1st place, gold medalist(s)	China	6	6	0
2nd place, silver medalist(s)	Japan	7	6	1
3rd place, bronze medalist(s)	Thailand	6	4	2
4	Vietnam	6	3	3
5	South Korea	6	4	2
6	Chinese Taipei	6	3	3
7	North Korea	6	2	4
8	Kazakhstan	7	2	5
9	India	5	3	2
10	Hong Kong	6	3	3
11	Nepal	5	1	4
12	Mongolia	6	1	5
13	Afghanistan	4	0	4
