= Volleyball at the 2022 Asian Games – Men's tournament =

Volleyball competition

Men at the 2022 Asian Games
- Venue: China Textile City Sports Centre Gymnasium; Linping Sports Centre Gymnasium; Deqing Sports Centre Gymnasium
- Date: 19–26 September 2023
- Competitors: 227 from 19 nations

Medalists
| gold medal | Iran |
| silver medal | China |
| bronze medal | Japan |

The men's tournament in volleyball at the 2022 Asian Games was the 19th edition of the event at an Asian Games, organised by the Asian volleyball governing body, the Asian Volleyball Confederation, in conjunction with the OCA. To avoid a clash of dates with the 2023 FIVB Volleyball Men's Olympic Qualification Tournaments, the men's tournament was allocated to the first week of the Games and started 4 days before the Opening Ceremonies. It was held in Hangzhou, China from 19 to 26 September 2023.

== Squads ==
| Afghanistan | Bahrain | Cambodia | China |
|---|---|---|---|
| Mohammad Sabawoon Wardak; Besmaullah Sultani; Abdul Malik Mamoozai; Ozair Mohammad Asefi; Gulam Rasool Haidari; Allah Nazar Karimy; Naser Kohistani; Abdul Mutalib Mohammadi; Mohammad Imran Niazai; Mohammad Shahid Badloon; Sabawoon Ghorzang; Sayed Habib Yousufi | Husain Ali Ehsan; Abbas Al-Khabbaz; Sayed Hashem Ali; Mahmood Al-Afyah; Mohamed Jasim Abdulla; Ali Habib Ebrahim; Husain Al-Jeshi; Ali Ebrahim Khamis; Naser Saleh Anan; Mohamed Yaqoob Abdulla; Ayman Ahmed Haroon; Abbas Abdulla Sultan | Khim Sovandara; Born Narith; Pin Sarun; Din Siden; Voeurn Veasna; Soeurn Heng; Mouen Meng Laiy; Thy Menghuong; Kuon Mom; Phol Ratanak; Soun Channaro; Mourn Nimul | Wang Dongchen; Jiang Chuan; Wang Hebin; Yu Yuantai; Yu Yaochen; Li Yongzhen; Peng Shikun; Qu Zongshuai; Zhang Guanhua; Zhang Jingyin; Wang Bin; Dai Qingyao |
| Chinese Taipei | Hong Kong | India | Indonesia |
| Li Chia-hsuan; Tseng Hsiang-ming; Lin Chien; Tai Ju-chien; Lei No; Wu Tsung-hsuan; Chang Yu-sheng; Chan Min-han; Yen Chen-fu; Lin Yi-huei; Chen Chien-chen; Tsai Pei-chang | Wong Wing Chun; Lam Sze Lok; Curtis Chiu; Leung Ho Yin; Wan Ka Nam; Ching Hon Lam; Yuen Sze Wai; Siu Cheong Hung; Kong Cheuk Hin; Poon Chi Leung; Damian Tam; Cheung Ngai Yiu | Guru Prasanth; Amit Gulia; Erin Varghese; Muthusamy Appavu; Shameemudheen Ammarambath; Vinit Kumar; Santhosh Sahaya Anthoni Raj; Rohit Kumar; Ashwal Rai; L. M. Manoj; Mohan Ukkrapandian; Hari Prasad | Boy Arnez Arabi; Hendra Kurniawan; Muhammad Malizi; Jasen Natanael Kilanta; Doni Haryono; Fahry Septian Putratama; Amin Kurnia Sandi Akbar; Hernanda Zulfi; Farhan Halim; Dio Zulfikri; Agil Angga Anggara; Fahreza Rakha Abhinaya |
| Iran | Japan | Kazakhstan | Kyrgyzstan |
| Mehdi Jelveh; Mohammad Mousavi; Mohammad Reza Hazratpour; Amin Esmaeilnejad; Saber Kazemi; Amir Hossein Esfandiar; Javad Karimi; Meisam Salehi; Mohammad Taher Vadi; Pouria Khanzadeh; Shahrouz Homayounfarmanesh; Mohammad Valizadeh | Akihiro Fukatsu; Kenta Takanashi; Masahiro Yanagida; Hiroto Nishiyama; Kazuyuki Takahashi; Takahiro Namba; Akito Yamazaki; Keihan Takahashi; Kento Asano; Yudai Arai; Hirohito Kashimura | Yerikzhan Boken; Boris Kempa; Zhaxylyk Tleulin; Nodirkhan Kadirkhanov; Vladislav Kunchenko; Vitaliy Vorivodin; Mikhail Ustinov; Askar Serik; Nurlibek Nurmakhambetov; Ilya Tavolzhanskiy; Sergey Kuznetsov; Maxim Michshenko | Kutmanbek Absatarov; Damir Gazinur Uulu; Medetbek Ergesh Uulu; Nurislam Medetbek Uulu; Nurmukhammed Toktoev; Baiastan Zhyrgalbek Uulu; Onolbek Kanybek Uulu; Zhantemir Zheenbek Uulu; Temir Musa Uulu; Omurbek Zhunusov; Zhamalidin Musaev; Roman Shilov |
| Mongolia | Nepal | Pakistan | Philippines |
| Bolor-Erdeniin Ankhbayar; Tamiraagiin Khangal; Otgonbayaryn Zolboo; Gantulgyn Tsend-Ayush; Zolbootyn Buyanjargal; Osoryn Choijilsüren; Battöriin Batsuuri; Gankhuyagiin Törmandakh; Altankhuyagiin Davaajargal; Batmönkhiin Amar; Ariuny Tör-Erdene; Sükheegiin Nyamsükh | Durga Bahadur Khadka; Manish Manandhar; Man Bahadur Shrestha; Hemant Bahadur Malla; Bishal Bahadur B. K.; Lokendra Raj Giri; Rabin Chand Thakuri; Tek Raj Awasthi; Samrat Bhandari; Safal Bishokarma; Dhiroj Kaji Basnet; Binod Bahadur Chand | Muhammad Hamad; Usman Faryad Ali; Farooq Haider; Mubashar Raza; Murad Khan; Muhammad Kashif Naveed; Abdul Zaheer; Murad Jehan; Afaq Khan; Hamid Yazman; Musawer Khan; Nasir Ali | Vince Mangulabnan; Vince Lorenzo; Ryan Ka; Kim Malabunga; Steve Rotter; Adrian Villados; Joshua Umandal; Bryan Bagunas; Marck Espejo; Rex Intal; Lloyd Josafat; Chumason Njigha |
| Qatar | South Korea | Thailand | |
| Youssef Oughlaf; Pape Maguette Diagne; Renan Ribeiro; Borislav Georgiev; Belal Abunabot; Mohamed Waleed Widatalla; Miloš Stevanović; Nikola Vasić; Mubarak Dahi; Raimi Wadidie; Ibrahim Mohammed; Naji Mahmoud | Han Sun-soo; Hwang Taek-eui; Park Kyeong-min; Heo Su-bong; Jung Ji-seok; Na Gyeong-bok; Kim Min-jae; Jeon Kwang-in; Kim Jun-woo; Jeong Han-yong; Im Dong-hyeok; Kim Kyu-min | Anut Promchan; Napadet Bhinijdee; Boonyarid Wongtorn; Thanathat Thaweerat; Mawin Maneewong; Tanapat Charoensuk; Jakkrit Thanomnoi; Chris Upakam; Chayut Khongrueng; Anurak Phanram; Assanaphan Chantajorn; Kissada Nilsawai | |

== Results ==
All times are China Standard Time (UTC+08:00)

=== Preliminary round ===
==== Pool A ====
| Pos | Team | Pld | W | L | Pts | SW | SL | SR | SPW | SPL | SPR | Qualification |
|---|---|---|---|---|---|---|---|---|---|---|---|---|
| 1 | China | 2 | 2 | 0 | 6 | 6 | 0 | MAX | 150 | 118 | 1.271 | Final round |
| 2 | Kazakhstan | 2 | 1 | 1 | 2 | 3 | 5 | 0.600 | 164 | 174 | 0.943 | Final round |
| 3 | Kyrgyzstan | 2 | 0 | 2 | 1 | 2 | 6 | 0.333 | 154 | 176 | 0.875 | |

Source: AVC

| Date | Time | Venue | | Score | | Set 1 | Set 2 | Set 3 | Set 4 | Set 5 | Total | Report |
|---|---|---|---|---|---|---|---|---|---|---|---|---|
| 19 Sep | 10:30 | Textile | Kyrgyzstan | 2–3 | Kazakhstan | 25–18 | 23–25 | 15–25 | 25–18 | 11–15 | 99–101 | Report |
| 20 Sep | 19:00 | Textile | China | 3–0 | Kyrgyzstan | 25–19 | 25–18 | 25–18 | | | 75–55 | Report |
| 21 Sep | 19:00 | Textile | Kazakhstan | 0–3 | China | 20–25 | 23–25 | 20–25 | | | 63–75 | Report |

==== Pool B ====
| Pos | Team | Pld | W | L | Pts | SW | SL | SR | SPW | SPL | SPR | Qualification |
|---|---|---|---|---|---|---|---|---|---|---|---|---|
| 1 | Iran | 2 | 2 | 0 | 6 | 6 | 1 | 6.000 | 172 | 117 | 1.470 | Final round |
| 2 | Bahrain | 2 | 1 | 1 | 3 | 4 | 4 | 1.000 | 175 | 175 | 1.000 | Final round |
| 3 | Nepal | 2 | 0 | 2 | 0 | 1 | 6 | 0.167 | 115 | 170 | 0.676 | |

Source: AVC

| Date | Time | Venue | | Score | | Set 1 | Set 2 | Set 3 | Set 4 | Set 5 | Total | Report |
|---|---|---|---|---|---|---|---|---|---|---|---|---|
| 19 Sep | 14:30 | Textile | Nepal | 1–3 | Bahrain | 25–20 | 20–25 | 18–25 | 15–25 | | 78–95 | Report |
| 20 Sep | 14:30 | Textile | Iran | 3–0 | Nepal | 25–9 | 25–15 | 25–13 | | | 75–37 | Report |
| 21 Sep | 14:30 | Textile | Bahrain | 1–3 | Iran | 16–25 | 19–25 | 25–22 | 20–25 | | 80–97 | Report |

==== Pool C ====
| Pos | Team | Pld | W | L | Pts | SW | SL | SR | SPW | SPL | SPR | Qualification |
|---|---|---|---|---|---|---|---|---|---|---|---|---|
| 1 | India | 2 | 2 | 0 | 5 | 6 | 2 | 3.000 | 191 | 162 | 1.179 | Final round |
| 2 | South Korea | 2 | 1 | 1 | 4 | 5 | 3 | 1.667 | 191 | 167 | 1.144 | Final round |
| 3 | Cambodia | 2 | 0 | 2 | 0 | 0 | 6 | 0.000 | 97 | 150 | 0.647 | |

Source: AVC

| Date | Time | Venue | | Score | | Set 1 | Set 2 | Set 3 | Set 4 | Set 5 | Total | Report |
|---|---|---|---|---|---|---|---|---|---|---|---|---|
| 19 Sep | 19:00 | Textile | India | 3–0 | Cambodia | 25–14 | 25–13 | 25–19 | | | 75–46 | Report |
| 20 Sep | 19:00 | Linping | South Korea | 2–3 | India | 27–25 | 27–29 | 22–25 | 25–20 | 15–17 | 116–116 | Report |
| 21 Sep | 14:30 | Linping | Cambodia | 0–3 | South Korea | 23–25 | 13–25 | 15–25 | | | 51–75 | Report |

==== Pool D ====
| Pos | Team | Pld | W | L | Pts | SW | SL | SR | SPW | SPL | SPR | Qualification |
|---|---|---|---|---|---|---|---|---|---|---|---|---|
| 1 | Pakistan | 2 | 2 | 0 | 6 | 6 | 0 | MAX | 150 | 113 | 1.327 | Final round |
| 2 | Chinese Taipei | 2 | 1 | 1 | 3 | 3 | 3 | 1.000 | 132 | 138 | 0.957 | Final round |
| 3 | Mongolia | 2 | 0 | 2 | 0 | 0 | 6 | 0.000 | 119 | 150 | 0.793 | |

Source: AVC

| Date | Time | Venue | | Score | | Set 1 | Set 2 | Set 3 | Set 4 | Set 5 | Total | Report |
|---|---|---|---|---|---|---|---|---|---|---|---|---|
| 19 Sep | 14:30 | Linping | Pakistan | 3–0 | Mongolia | 25–17 | 25–19 | 25–20 | | | 75–56 | Report |
| 20 Sep | 10:30 | Linping | Chinese Taipei | 0–3 | Pakistan | 18–25 | 20–25 | 19–25 | | | 57–75 | Report |
| 21 Sep | 19:00 | Linping | Mongolia | 0–3 | Chinese Taipei | 22–25 | 20–25 | 21–25 | | | 63–75 | Report |

==== Pool E ====
| Pos | Team | Pld | W | L | Pts | SW | SL | SR | SPW | SPL | SPR | Qualification |
|---|---|---|---|---|---|---|---|---|---|---|---|---|
| 1 | Qatar | 2 | 2 | 0 | 6 | 6 | 2 | 3.000 | 194 | 159 | 1.220 | Final round |
| 2 | Thailand | 2 | 1 | 1 | 3 | 4 | 3 | 1.333 | 154 | 143 | 1.077 | Final round |
| 3 | Hong Kong | 2 | 0 | 2 | 0 | 1 | 6 | 0.167 | 126 | 172 | 0.733 | |

Source: AVC

| Date | Time | Venue | | Score | | Set 1 | Set 2 | Set 3 | Set 4 | Set 5 | Total | Report |
|---|---|---|---|---|---|---|---|---|---|---|---|---|
| 19 Sep | 19:00 | Linping | Thailand | 3–0 | Hong Kong | 25–17 | 25–16 | 25–13 | | | 75–46 | Report |
| 20 Sep | 14:30 | Linping | Qatar | 3–1 | Thailand | 25–16 | 22–25 | 25–19 | 25–19 | | 97–79 | Report |
| 21 Sep | 10:30 | Deqing | Hong Kong | 1–3 | Qatar | 21–25 | 13–25 | 25–22 | 21–25 | | 80–97 | Report |

==== Pool F ====
| Pos | Team | Pld | W | L | Pts | SW | SL | SR | SPW | SPL | SPR | Qualification |
|---|---|---|---|---|---|---|---|---|---|---|---|---|
| 1 | Japan | 3 | 3 | 0 | 9 | 9 | 0 | MAX | 226 | 166 | 1.361 | Final round |
| 2 | Indonesia | 3 | 2 | 1 | 6 | 6 | 3 | 2.000 | 206 | 196 | 1.051 | Final round |
| 3 | Philippines | 3 | 1 | 2 | 3 | 3 | 6 | 0.500 | 196 | 201 | 0.975 | |
| 4 | Afghanistan | 3 | 0 | 3 | 0 | 0 | 9 | 0.000 | 161 | 226 | 0.712 | |

Source: AVC

| Date | Time | Venue | | Score | | Set 1 | Set 2 | Set 3 | Set 4 | Set 5 | Total | Report |
|---|---|---|---|---|---|---|---|---|---|---|---|---|
| 19 Sep | 14:30 | Deqing | Japan | 3–0 | Afghanistan | 26–24 | 25–22 | 25–8 | | | 76–54 | Report |
| 19 Sep | 19:00 | Deqing | Indonesia | 3–0 | Philippines | 25–22 | 25–23 | 25–20 | | | 75–65 | Report |
| 20 Sep | 14:30 | Deqing | Afghanistan | 0–3 | Philippines | 23–25 | 16–25 | 12–25 | | | 51–75 | Report |
| 20 Sep | 19:00 | Deqing | Japan | 3–0 | Indonesia | 25–18 | 25–20 | 25–18 | | | 75–56 | Report |
| 21 Sep | 14:30 | Deqing | Indonesia | 3–0 | Afghanistan | 25–18 | 25–21 | 25–17 | | | 75–56 | Report |
| 21 Sep | 19:00 | Deqing | Philippines | 0–3 | Japan | 19–25 | 14–25 | 23–25 | | | 56–75 | Report |

=== Final round ===
Cross matches for top 12
22 September
China | 3
Indonesia | 1
22 September
India | 3
Chinese Taipei | 0
22 September
Kazakhstan | 0
Japan | 3
22 September
Iran | 3
Thailand | 0
22 September
South Korea | 0
Pakistan | 3
22 September
Bahrain | 1
Qatar | 3

Classification 1st–6th
24 September
India | 0
Japan | 3
24 September
Pakistan | 1
Qatar | 3

Semifinals
25 September
China | 3
Japan | 0
25 September
Iran | 3
Qatar | 0

Gold medal match
26 September
China | 1
Iran | 3
Bronze medal match
26 September
Japan | 3
Qatar | 1

Classification 7th–12th
24 September
Chinese Taipei | 2
Kazakhstan | 3
24 September
South Korea | 3
Bahrain | 1

Classification 7th–10th
25 September
Indonesia | 3
Kazakhstan | 2
25 September
Thailand | 1
South Korea | 3

Classification 7th–8th
26 September
Indonesia | 2
South Korea | 3
Classification 9th–10th
26 September
Kazakhstan | 3
Thailand | 0

==== Cross matches for top 12 ====
| Date | Time | Venue | | Score | | Set 1 | Set 2 | Set 3 | Set 4 | Set 5 | Total | Report |
|---|---|---|---|---|---|---|---|---|---|---|---|---|
| 22 Sep | 10:30 | Linping | Iran | 3–0 | Thailand | 25–21 | 25–18 | 25–16 | | | 75–55 | Report |
| 22 Sep | 10:30 | Textile | Bahrain | 1–3 | Qatar | 23–25 | 25–18 | 19–25 | 17–25 | | 84–93 | Report |
| 22 Sep | 14:30 | Linping | Kazakhstan | 0–3 | Japan | 22–25 | 21–25 | 15–25 | | | 58–75 | Report |
| 22 Sep | 14:30 | Textile | India | 3–0 | Chinese Taipei | 25–22 | 25–22 | 25–21 | | | 75–65 | Report |
| 22 Sep | 19:00 | Linping | China | 3–1 | Indonesia | 25–17 | 25–17 | 23–25 | 25–22 | | 98–81 | Report |
| 22 Sep | 19:00 | Textile | South Korea | 0–3 | Pakistan | 19–25 | 22–25 | 21–25 | | | 62–75 | Report |

==== Classification 7th–12th ====
| Date | Time | Venue | | Score | | Set 1 | Set 2 | Set 3 | Set 4 | Set 5 | Total | Report |
|---|---|---|---|---|---|---|---|---|---|---|---|---|
| 24 Sep | 14:30 | Linping | Chinese Taipei | 2–3 | Kazakhstan | 24–26 | 25–20 | 25–23 | 22–25 | 17–19 | 113–113 | Report |
| 24 Sep | 19:00 | Linping | South Korea | 3–1 | Bahrain | 25–19 | 25–21 | 19–25 | 25–23 | | 94–88 | Report |

==== Classification 1st–6th ====
| Date | Time | Venue | | Score | | Set 1 | Set 2 | Set 3 | Set 4 | Set 5 | Total | Report |
|---|---|---|---|---|---|---|---|---|---|---|---|---|
| 24 Sep | 14:30 | Textile | India | 0–3 | Japan | 16–25 | 18–25 | 17–25 | | | 51–75 | Report |
| 24 Sep | 19:00 | Textile | Pakistan | 1–3 | Qatar | 24–26 | 19–25 | 25–23 | 18–25 | | 86–99 | Report |

==== Classification 7th–10th ====
| Date | Time | Venue | | Score | | Set 1 | Set 2 | Set 3 | Set 4 | Set 5 | Total | Report |
|---|---|---|---|---|---|---|---|---|---|---|---|---|
| 25 Sep | 14:30 | Textile | Indonesia | 3–2 | Kazakhstan | 25–22 | 24–26 | 22–25 | 25–16 | 15–12 | 111–101 | Report |
| 25 Sep | 19:00 | Textile | Thailand | 1–3 | South Korea | 19–25 | 23–25 | 25–23 | 29–31 | | 96–104 | Report |

==== Semifinals ====
| Date | Time | Venue | | Score | | Set 1 | Set 2 | Set 3 | Set 4 | Set 5 | Total | Report |
|---|---|---|---|---|---|---|---|---|---|---|---|---|
| 25 Sep | 14:30 | Linping | Iran | 3–0 | Qatar | 25–20 | 25–20 | 25–22 | | | 75–62 | Report |
| 25 Sep | 19:00 | Linping | China | 3–0 | Japan | 25–15 | 25–20 | 25–21 | | | 75–56 | Report |

==== Classification 11th–12th ====
| Date | Time | Venue | | Score | | Set 1 | Set 2 | Set 3 | Set 4 | Set 5 | Total | Report |
|---|---|---|---|---|---|---|---|---|---|---|---|---|
| 25 Sep | 10:30 | Linping | Chinese Taipei | 3–1 | Bahrain | 25–20 | 25–18 | 22–25 | 25–19 | | 97–82 | Report |

==== Classification 9th–10th ====
| Date | Time | Venue | | Score | | Set 1 | Set 2 | Set 3 | Set 4 | Set 5 | Total | Report |
|---|---|---|---|---|---|---|---|---|---|---|---|---|
| 26 Sep | 10:30 | Textile | Kazakhstan | 3–0 | Thailand | 25–19 | 25–21 | 25–22 | | | 75–62 | Report |

==== Classification 7th–8th ====
| Date | Time | Venue | | Score | | Set 1 | Set 2 | Set 3 | Set 4 | Set 5 | Total | Report |
|---|---|---|---|---|---|---|---|---|---|---|---|---|
| 26 Sep | 14:30 | Textile | Indonesia | 2–3 | South Korea | 27–29 | 25–19 | 19–25 | 25–21 | 8–15 | 104–109 | Report |

==== Classification 5th–6th ====
| Date | Time | Venue | | Score | | Set 1 | Set 2 | Set 3 | Set 4 | Set 5 | Total | Report |
|---|---|---|---|---|---|---|---|---|---|---|---|---|
| 26 Sep | 18:30 | Textile | India | 0–3 | Pakistan | 21–25 | 20–25 | 23–25 | | | 64–75 | Report |

==== Bronze medal match ====
| Date | Time | Venue | | Score | | Set 1 | Set 2 | Set 3 | Set 4 | Set 5 | Total | Report |
|---|---|---|---|---|---|---|---|---|---|---|---|---|
| 26 Sep | 14:30 | Linping | Qatar | 1–3 | Japan | 35–37 | 22–25 | 25–23 | 23–25 | | 105–110 | Report |

==== Gold medal match ====
| Date | Time | Venue | | Score | | Set 1 | Set 2 | Set 3 | Set 4 | Set 5 | Total | Report |
|---|---|---|---|---|---|---|---|---|---|---|---|---|
| 26 Sep | 19:30 | Linping | Iran | 3–1 | China | 19–25 | 25–14 | 25–22 | 26–24 | | 95–85 | Report |

== Final standing ==
| Rank | Team | Pld | W | L |
|---|---|---|---|---|
| 1st place, gold medalist(s) | Iran | 5 | 5 | 0 |
| 2nd place, silver medalist(s) | China | 5 | 4 | 1 |
| 3rd place, bronze medalist(s) | Japan | 7 | 6 | 1 |
| 4 | Qatar | 6 | 4 | 2 |
| 5 | Pakistan | 5 | 4 | 1 |
| 6 | India | 5 | 3 | 2 |
| 7 | South Korea | 6 | 4 | 2 |
| 8 | Indonesia | 6 | 3 | 3 |
| 9 | Kazakhstan | 6 | 3 | 3 |
| 10 | Thailand | 5 | 1 | 4 |
| 11 | Chinese Taipei | 5 | 2 | 3 |
| 12 | Bahrain | 5 | 1 | 4 |
| 13 | Cambodia | 2 | 0 | 2 |
| 13 | Hong Kong | 2 | 0 | 2 |
| 13 | Kyrgyzstan | 2 | 0 | 2 |
| 13 | Mongolia | 2 | 0 | 2 |
| 13 | Nepal | 2 | 0 | 2 |
| 13 | Philippines | 3 | 1 | 2 |
| 19 | Afghanistan | 3 | 0 | 3 |
