= Volleyball at the 2018 Asian Games – Men's tournament =

Volleyball competition

Men at the 2018 Asian Games
- Venue: Gelora Bung Karno Tennis Indoor; Bulungan Sports Hall
- Date: 20 August – 1 September 2018
- Competitors: 266 from 20 nations

Medalists
gold medal	Iran
silver medal	South Korea
bronze medal	Chinese Taipei

The men's tournament in volleyball at the 2018 Asian Games was the 18th edition of the event at an Asian Games, organised by the Asian volleyball governing body, the Asian Volleyball Confederation, in conjunction with the OCA. It was held in Jakarta, Indonesia from 20 August to 1 September 2018.

== Squads ==
China	Chinese Taipei	Hong Kong	India
Li Rui; Yu Yuantai; Zhang Chen; Zhong Weijun; Li Runming; Wang Jingyi; Yuan Dangyi; Zhan Guojun; Li Liye; Li Yuanbo; Zhang Zhejia; Peng Shikun; Ren Qi; Chen Jiajie	Lin Cheng-yang; Liu Hong-jie; Li Chia-hsuan; Huang Shih-hao; Tai Ju-chien; Liu Hung-min; Su Hou-chen; Wu Tsung-hsuan; Hsu Mei-chung; Huang Chien-feng; Lin Yi-huei; Wang Chien-pin; Shih Hsiu-chih; Chen Chien-chen	Lam Ki Fung; Au Chin To; Siu Cheong Hung; Leung Ho Yin; Lee Man Sing; Chung Wai Sze; Wong Hei Chun; Sin Ka Chun; Wu Lok Kan; Edmond Chiu; Luk Chun Ho; Poon Chi Leung; Yau Tze Ching; Man Chun Hin	Akhin Jas; Amit Gulia; Prabakaran Pattani; Ranjit Singh; Pankaj Sharma; Vinit Kumar; Ajithlal Chandran; Deepesh Kumar Sinha; Rohit Kumar; Charles Jerome Vinith; Sinnadhu Prabagaran; Ashok Karthik; Mohan Ukkrapandian; Gurinder Singh
Indonesia	Iran	Japan	Kazakhstan
Doni Haryono; Sigit Ardian; Mahfud Nurcahyadi; Muhammad Malizi; Delly Dwi Putra Heryanto; Galih Bayu Saputra; Yuda Mardiansyah Putra; Rendy Febriant Tamamilang; Rivan Nurmulki; Nizar Julfikar Munawar; Ramzil Huda; Aji Maulana; Hernanda Zulfi; Veleg Dhany Ristan Krisnawan	Milad Ebadipour; Saman Faezi; Saeid Marouf; Farhad Ghaemi; Mohammad Mousavi; Amir Ghafour; Saber Kazemi; Mohammad Javad Manavinejad; Ali Shafiei; Mohammad Taher Vadi; Mehdi Marandi; Morteza Sharifi; Mohammad Reza Hazratpour; Amir Hossein Toukhteh	Hideomi Fukatsu; Shunichiro Sato; Naoya Takano; Jin Tsuzuki; Takashi Dekita; Hiroki Ozawa; Shunsuke Chijiki; Ryota Denda; Takuya Takamatsu; Motoki Eiro; Tomohiro Horie; Ryuta Honma; Takeshi Ogawa; Taishi Onodera	Roman Fartov; Anton Kuznetsov; Kairat Baibekov; Vassiliy Donets; Maxim Michshenko; Damir Akimov; Nodirkhan Kadirkhanov; Vitaliy Erdshtein; Aibat Netalin; Mikhail Ustinov; Alexandr Suleimanov; Ivan Minakov; Ivan Russapetov; Vitaliy Mironenko
Kyrgyzstan	Maldives	Mongolia	Myanmar
Manazbek Nuraly Uulu; Kutmanbek Absatarov; Medetbek Ergesh Uulu; Kylychbek Sarbaghyshev; Nurmukhammed Toktoev; Emil Idirisov; Onolbek Kanybek Uulu; Damir Gazinur Uulu; Temir Musa Uulu; Talgat Chalmashbekov; Roman Shilov; Azamat Jumabekov	Mohamed Naeem; Shuaib Abdul Latheef; Javam Ali; Ali Mauroof; Mohamed Mimrah Hassan; Adam Fairooz; Ahmed Anil Naseer; Mohamed Mimrah; Ahmed Shimau; Ahmed Abdul Kareem; Hassan Nilam; Ali Huzam; Hussain Visam; Adam Naseem	Sükheegiin Nyamsükh; Gankhuyagiin Törmandakh; Enkheegiin Altangerel; Zolbootyn Buyanjargal; Myagmarchimediin Tserenbaatar; Mönkhbayaryn Mönkhsaikahn; Törmandakhyn Usukhbayar; Jargalyn Batjargal; Altantsagiin Bazargur; Altankhuyagiin Davaajargal; Aduuchiin Mönkh-Erdene; Ganbatyn Erdembileg	San Nyunt Mg; Myo Min Oo; Ya Htike Wai; Aung Phyo; Khwe Char Maung; Do Mae Ni Ko; Aung Thu; Zaw Lwin Tun; Zaw Htet Aung; Zaw Win Hlaing; Thwin Htoo Zin; Nay Lin Aung
Nepal	Pakistan	Qatar	Saudi Arabia
Bishal Bahadur B. K.; Deepak Raj Joshi; Hari Bahadur Adhikari; Man Bahadur Shrestha; Bhairab Bahadur Bam; Dhan Bahadur Bhatta; Durga Prasad Mahato; Narendra Giri; Em Bahadur Magar; Raju Sherchan; Kul Bahadur Thapa; Ishwor Thapa	Mohib Rasool; Munir Khan; Muhammad Waseem; Asif Nadeem; Sheraz Ahmed; Mubashar Raza; Aimal Khan; Fahad Raza; Muhammad Idrees; Nasir Ali; Muhammad Kashif Naveed; Murad Jehan	Mahmoud Assam; Renan Ribeiro; Sultan Hussain Abdalla; Sulaiman Saeed; Belal Abunabot; Miloš Stevanović; Ndir Ababacar; Nikola Vasić; Mubarak Dahi; Osman Abdulwahed; Ali Kanani; Ibrahim Mohammed; Ahmed Jamal Noaman; Khaled Shamiyeh	Ibrahim Al-Moaiqel; Nawaf Al-Bakhit; Ahmed Al-Bakhit; Hassan Wathlan; Meshari Al-Gurashi; Sami Samiti; Hassan Al-Abdulbaqi; Bandar Al-Zahrani; Abdullah Al-Zahrani; Muwaffaq Al-Mutairi; Omar Al-Najrani; Ibrahim Majrashi
South Korea	Sri Lanka	Thailand	Vietnam
Song Myung-geun; Han Sun-soo; Seo Jae-duck; Jeong Min-su; Bu Yong-chan; Lee Min-gyu; Kim Kyu-min; Na Gyeong-bok; Kwak Seung-suk; Jung Ji-seok; Choi Min-ho; Jeon Kwang-in; Moon Sung-min; Kim Jae-hwi	Malith Dinidu Chamara; A. W. Lakmal; Ayesh Dilhan Perera; Janitha Surath; Danushka Dilshan; Chamara Mihiran; Wasantha Lakmal; Lasindu Methmal; Shamil Malinda Silva; Pramesh Prasanna; Kasun Fernando; Gayan Madushanka; Shehan Vimukthi Sagara; Deepthi Romesh	Jirayu Raksakaew; Amorntep Konhan; Jakkapong Tongklang; Jakraprop Saengsee; Kissada Nilsawai; Kittikun Sriutthawong; Kittinon Namkhunthod; Chatmongkhon Paketkaeo; Anuchit Pakdeekaew; Mawin Maneewong; Kitsada Somkane; Kantapat Koonmee; Saranchit Charoensuk; Montri Puanglib	Huỳnh Trung Trực; Nguyễn Xuân Thành; Giang Văn Đức; Nguyễn Thanh Hải; Phạm Thái Hưng; Đinh Văn Tú; Nguyễn Vũ Hoàng; Lê Thành Hạc; Nguyễn Thanh Tùng; Từ Thanh Thuận; Quản Trọng Nghĩa; Hoàng Văn Phương

== Results ==
All times are Western Indonesia Time (UTC+07:00)

Legend

- WO — Won by walkover

=== Preliminary ===
==== Pool A ====
Pos	Team	Pld	W	L	Pts	SW	SL	SR	SPW	SPL	SPR	Qualification
1	Saudi Arabia	2	2	0	6	6	2	3.000	186	167	1.114	Classification for 1–12
2	Indonesia	2	1	1	3	4	3	1.333	164	149	1.101	Classification for 1–12
3	Kyrgyzstan	2	0	2	0	1	6	0.167	136	170	0.800	Classification for 13–20

Source: OCA

Date	Time	Venue		Score		Set 1	Set 2	Set 3	Set 4	Set 5	Total	Report
20 Aug	10:00	GBK	Saudi Arabia	3–1	Kyrgyzstan	25–18	20–25	25–18	25–17		95–78	Report
22 Aug	19:00	GBK	Indonesia	1–3	Saudi Arabia	23–25	25–16	19–25	22–25		89–91	Report
24 Aug	16:30	GBK	Kyrgyzstan	0–3	Indonesia	21–25	17–25	20–25			58–75	Report

==== Pool B ====
Pos	Team	Pld	W	L	Pts	SW	SL	SR	SPW	SPL	SPR	Qualification
1	Iran	2	2	0	6	6	0	MAX	158	122	1.295	Classification for 1–12
2	Pakistan	2	1	1	3	3	3	1.000	140	132	1.061	Classification for 1–12
3	Mongolia	2	0	2	0	0	6	0.000	106	150	0.707	Classification for 13–20

Source: OCA

Date	Time	Venue		Score		Set 1	Set 2	Set 3	Set 4	Set 5	Total	Report
20 Aug	12:30	GBK	Pakistan	3–0	Mongolia	25–16	25–19	25–14			75–49	Report
22 Aug	16:30	Bulun.	Iran	3–0	Pakistan	25–16	25–18	33–31			83–65	Report
24 Aug	09:00	Bulun.	Mongolia	0–3	Iran	18–25	19–25	20–25			57–75	Report

==== Pool C ====
Pos	Team	Pld	W	L	Pts	SW	SL	SR	SPW	SPL	SPR	Qualification
1	Japan	2	2	0	4	6	4	1.500	224	216	1.037	Classification for 1–12
2	Myanmar	2	1	1	4	5	4	1.250	199	191	1.042	Classification for 1–12
3	Kazakhstan	2	0	2	1	3	6	0.500	193	209	0.923	Classification for 13–20

Source: OCA

Date	Time	Venue		Score		Set 1	Set 2	Set 3	Set 4	Set 5	Total	Report
20 Aug	16:30	GBK	Kazakhstan	1–3	Myanmar	25–17	22–25	19–25	18–25		84–92	Report
22 Aug	12:30	GBK	Japan	3–2	Kazakhstan	22–25	25–20	25–27	25–19	20–18	117–109	Report
24 Aug	09:00	GBK	Myanmar	2–3	Japan	21–25	25–17	19–25	25–21	17–19	107–107	Report

==== Pool D ====
Pos	Team	Pld	W	L	Pts	SW	SL	SR	SPW	SPL	SPR	Qualification
1	South Korea	2	2	0	5	6	2	3.000	184	147	1.252	Classification for 1–12
2	Chinese Taipei	2	1	1	4	5	3	1.667	179	166	1.078	Classification for 1–12
3	Nepal	2	0	2	0	0	6	0.000	100	150	0.667	Classification for 13–20

Source: OCA

Date	Time	Venue		Score		Set 1	Set 2	Set 3	Set 4	Set 5	Total	Report
20 Aug	19:00	GBK	Chinese Taipei	2–3	South Korea	21–25	25–21	21–25	25–23	12–15	104–109	Report
22 Aug	12:30	Bulun.	Nepal	0–3	Chinese Taipei	23–25	19–25	15–25			57–75	Report
24 Aug	16:30	Bulun.	South Korea	3–0	Nepal	25–16	25–13	25–14			75–43	Report

==== Pool E ====
Pos	Team	Pld	W	L	Pts	SW	SL	SR	SPW	SPL	SPR	Qualification
1	Thailand	3	2	1	7	8	5	1.600	301	284	1.060	Classification for 1–12
2	China	3	2	1	6	8	6	1.333	313	301	1.040	Classification for 1–12
3	Sri Lanka	3	1	2	3	5	6	0.833	240	244	0.984	Classification for 13–20
4	Vietnam	3	1	2	2	4	8	0.500	260	285	0.912	Classification for 13–20

Source: OCA

Date	Time	Venue		Score		Set 1	Set 2	Set 3	Set 4	Set 5	Total	Report
20 Aug	10:00	Bulun.	China	2–3	Vietnam	23–25	24–26	25–19	25–22	19–21	116–113	Report
20 Aug	12:30	Bulun.	Thailand	3–1	Sri Lanka	13–25	25–21	25–23	27–25		90–94	Report
22 Aug	16:30	GBK	China	3–2	Thailand	12–25	17–25	31–29	25–23	17–15	102–117	Report
23 Aug	16:30	Bulun.	Vietnam	0–3	Sri Lanka	23–25	18–25	18–25			59–75	Report
24 Aug	19:00	GBK	Thailand	3–1	Vietnam	19–25	25–21	25–21	25–21		94–88	Report
25 Aug	10:00	GBK	Sri Lanka	1–3	China	15–25	25–20	14–25	17–25		71–95	Report

==== Pool F ====
Pos	Team	Pld	W	L	Pts	SW	SL	SR	SPW	SPL	SPR	Qualification
1	Qatar	3	3	0	9	9	0	MAX	225	143	1.573	Classification for 1–12
2	India	3	2	1	6	6	3	2.000	207	191	1.084	Classification for 1–12
3	Hong Kong	3	1	2	3	3	6	0.500	197	206	0.956	Classification for 13–20
4	Maldives	3	0	3	0	0	9	0.000	136	225	0.604	Classification for 13–20

Source: OCA

Date	Time	Venue		Score		Set 1	Set 2	Set 3	Set 4	Set 5	Total	Report
20 Aug	16:30	Bulun.	India	3–0	Hong Kong	27–25	25–22	25–19			77–66	Report
20 Aug	19:00	Bulun.	Qatar	3–0	Maldives	25–11	25–8	25–13			75–32	Report
22 Aug	19:00	Bulun.	India	0–3	Qatar	15–25	20–25	20–25			55–75	Report
23 Aug	19:00	Bulun.	Hong Kong	3–0	Maldives	25–16	25–21	25–17			75–54	Report
24 Aug	19:00	Bulun.	Qatar	3–0	Hong Kong	25–16	25–22	25–18			75–56	Report
25 Aug	10:00	Bulun.	Maldives	0–3	India	12–25	21–25	17–25			50–75	Report

=== Classification for 13–20 ===
Round of 16
26 August
Sri Lanka	3
Maldives	1
26 August
Hong Kong	1
Vietnam	3

Quarterfinals for 13–18
28 August
Nepal	3
Mongolia	1
28 August
Kazakhstan	2
Kyrgyzstan	3

Semifinals for 13–16
30 August
Sri Lanka	3
Nepal	1
30 August
Vietnam	3
Kyrgyzstan	0

Classification 13–14
31 August
Sri Lanka	3
Vietnam	0
Classification 15–16
31 August
Nepal	3
Kyrgyzstan	0

==== Round of 16 ====
Date	Time	Venue		Score		Set 1	Set 2	Set 3	Set 4	Set 5	Total	Report
26 Aug	10:00	Bulun.	Sri Lanka	3–1	Maldives	16–25	25–18	27–25	25–15		93–83	Report
26 Aug	12:30	Bulun.	Hong Kong	1–3	Vietnam	14–25	23–25	25–20	13–25		75–95	Report

==== Quarterfinals for 13–18 ====
Date	Time	Venue		Score		Set 1	Set 2	Set 3	Set 4	Set 5	Total	Report
28 Aug	12:30	Bulun.	Nepal	3–1	Mongolia	26–28	25–16	30–28	25–19		106–91	Report
28 Aug	16:30	Bulun.	Kazakhstan	2–3	Kyrgyzstan	29–27	20–25	25–23	23–25	7–15	104–115	Report

==== Semifinals for 13–16 ====
Date	Time	Venue		Score		Set 1	Set 2	Set 3	Set 4	Set 5	Total	Report
30 Aug	16:30	Bulun.	Sri Lanka	3–1	Nepal	23–25	25–16	26–24	25–21		99–86	Report
30 Aug	19:00	Bulun.	Vietnam	3–0	Kyrgyzstan	25–16	26–24	29–27			80–67	Report

==== Classification 19–20 ====
Date	Time	Venue		Score		Set 1	Set 2	Set 3	Set 4	Set 5	Total	Report
28 Aug	19:00	Bulun.	Maldives	0–3	Hong Kong	20–25	22–25	16–25			58–75	Report

==== Classification 17–18 ====
Date	Time	Venue		Score		Set 1	Set 2	Set 3	Set 4	Set 5	Total	Report
30 Aug	10:00	Bulun.	Mongolia	0–3	Kazakhstan (WO)	0–25	0–25	0–25			0–75	Report

==== Classification 15–16 ====
Date	Time	Venue		Score		Set 1	Set 2	Set 3	Set 4	Set 5	Total	Report
31 Aug	17:00	Bulun.	(WO) Nepal	3–0	Kyrgyzstan	25–0	25–0	25–0			75–0	Report

==== Classification 13–14 ====
Date	Time	Venue		Score		Set 1	Set 2	Set 3	Set 4	Set 5	Total	Report
31 Aug	19:30	Bulun.	Sri Lanka	3–0	Vietnam	25–21	25–21	25–20			75–62	Report

=== Final round ===
Round of 16
26 August
Saudi Arabia	1
Chinese Taipei	3
26 August
Thailand	2
Indonesia	3
26 August
South Korea	3
Pakistan	0
26 August
Iran	3
China	0
26 August
Japan	3
India	1
26 August
Qatar	3
Myanmar	0

Quarterfinals
28 August
Indonesia	0
South Korea	3
28 August
Japan	2
Qatar	3

Semifinals
30 August
Chinese Taipei	2
South Korea	3
30 August
Iran	3
Qatar	0

Gold medal match
1 September
South Korea	0
Iran	3
Bronze medal match
1 September
Chinese Taipei	3
Qatar	1

Quarterfinals for 7–12
28 August
Thailand	3
Myanmar	1
28 August
India	1
Pakistan	3

Semifinals for 7–10
30 August
Saudi Arabia	0
Thailand	3
30 August
China	2
Pakistan	3

Classification 7–8
1 September
Thailand	3
Pakistan	1
Classification 9–10
31 August
Saudi Arabia	0
China	3

==== Round of 16 ====
Date	Time	Venue		Score		Set 1	Set 2	Set 3	Set 4	Set 5	Total	Report
26 Aug	10:00	GBK	South Korea	3–0	Pakistan	25–19	25–22	25–17			75–58	Report
26 Aug	12:30	GBK	Japan	3–1	India	25–23	25–22	23–25	25–20		98–90	Report
26 Aug	16:30	Bulun.	Iran	3–0	China	27–25	25–20	25–21			77–66	Report
26 Aug	16:30	GBK	Thailand	2–3	Indonesia	22–25	23–25	25–23	25–22	12–15	107–110	Report
26 Aug	19:00	GBK	Saudi Arabia	1–3	Chinese Taipei	25–22	19–25	8–25	23–25		75–97	Report
26 Aug	19:00	Bulun.	Qatar	3–0	Myanmar	25–21	25–18	25–20			75–59	Report

==== Quarterfinals for 7–12 ====
Date	Time	Venue		Score		Set 1	Set 2	Set 3	Set 4	Set 5	Total	Report
28 Aug	10:00	GBK	Thailand	3–1	Myanmar	26–24	37–35	22–25	25–15		110–99	Report
28 Aug	12:30	GBK	India	1–3	Pakistan	25–21	21–25	21–25	23–25		90–96	Report

==== Quarterfinals ====
Date	Time	Venue		Score		Set 1	Set 2	Set 3	Set 4	Set 5	Total	Report
28 Aug	16:30	GBK	Indonesia	0–3	South Korea	22–25	18–25	18–25			58–75	Report
28 Aug	19:00	GBK	Japan	2–3	Qatar	18–25	28–26	21–25	25–22	22–24	114–122	Report

==== Semifinals for 7–10 ====
Date	Time	Venue		Score		Set 1	Set 2	Set 3	Set 4	Set 5	Total	Report
30 Aug	10:00	GBK	Saudi Arabia	0–3	Thailand	23–25	25–27	22–25			70–77	Report
30 Aug	12:30	GBK	China	2–3	Pakistan	25–17	26–28	30–28	19–25	16–18	116–116	Report

==== Semifinals ====
Date	Time	Venue		Score		Set 1	Set 2	Set 3	Set 4	Set 5	Total	Report
30 Aug	16:30	GBK	Chinese Taipei	2–3	South Korea	25–20	20–25	16–25	25–20	12–15	98–105	Report
30 Aug	19:00	GBK	Iran	3–0	Qatar	25–23	25–19	25–18			75–60	Report

==== Classification 11–12 ====
Date	Time	Venue		Score		Set 1	Set 2	Set 3	Set 4	Set 5	Total	Report
30 Aug	12:30	Bulun.	Myanmar	3–2	India	25–21	18–25	27–25	15–25	15–13	100–109	Report

==== Classification 9–10 ====
Date	Time	Venue		Score		Set 1	Set 2	Set 3	Set 4	Set 5	Total	Report
31 Aug	14:30	Bulun.	Saudi Arabia	0–3	China	15–25	10–25	17–25			42–75	Report

==== Classification 7–8 ====
Date	Time	Venue		Score		Set 1	Set 2	Set 3	Set 4	Set 5	Total	Report
01 Sep	16:30	Bulun.	Thailand	3–1	Pakistan	20–25	25–23	28–26	25–21		98–95	Report

==== Classification 5–6 ====
Date	Time	Venue		Score		Set 1	Set 2	Set 3	Set 4	Set 5	Total	Report
01 Sep	19:00	Bulun.	Indonesia	2–3	Japan	33–35	25–22	21–25	27–25	12–15	118–122	Report

==== Bronze medal match ====
Date	Time	Venue		Score		Set 1	Set 2	Set 3	Set 4	Set 5	Total	Report
01 Sep	10:00	GBK	Chinese Taipei	3–1	Qatar	25–22	25–23	17–25	25–16		92–86	Report

==== Gold medal match ====
Date	Time	Venue		Score		Set 1	Set 2	Set 3	Set 4	Set 5	Total	Report
01 Sep	19:00	GBK	South Korea	0–3	Iran	17–25	22–25	21–25			60–75	Report

== Final standing ==
Rank	Team	Pld	W	L
1st place, gold medalist(s)	Iran	5	5	0
2nd place, silver medalist(s)	South Korea	6	5	1
3rd place, bronze medalist(s)	Chinese Taipei	5	3	2
4	Qatar	7	5	2
5	Japan	5	4	1
6	Indonesia	5	2	3
7	Thailand	7	5	2
8	Pakistan	6	3	3
9	China	6	3	3
10	Saudi Arabia	5	2	3
11	Myanmar	5	2	3
12	India	6	2	4
13	Sri Lanka	6	4	2
14	Vietnam	6	3	3
15	Nepal	5	2	3
16	Kyrgyzstan	5	1	4
17	Kazakhstan	4	1	3
18	Mongolia	4	0	4
19	Hong Kong	5	2	3
20	Maldives	5	0	5
