= Volleyball at the 1986 Asian Games – Men's tournament =

Men at the 1986 Asian Games
- Venue: Hanyang University Gymnasium
- Date: 21 September – 4 October 1986
- Nations: 12

Medalists
gold medal	China
silver medal	South Korea
bronze medal	India

The men's volleyball tournament at the 1986 Asian Games was held from 21 September to 4 October, 1986 in Seoul, South Korea.

== Results ==
=== Preliminary round ===
==== Pool A ====
Pos	Team	Pld	W	L	Pts	SW	SL	SR	SPW	SPL	SPR	Qualification
1	South Korea	5	5	0	10	15	0	MAX	225	59	3.814	Final round
2	India	5	4	1	9	12	4	3.000	217	130	1.669	Final round
3	Saudi Arabia	5	3	2	8	10	8	1.250	202	180	1.122	Classification 5th–8th
4	Bahrain	5	2	3	7	8	10	0.800	169	213	0.793	Classification 5th–8th
5	Indonesia	5	1	4	6	4	12	0.333	128	201	0.637	Classification 9th–12th
6	Hong Kong	5	0	5	5	0	15	0.000	67	225	0.298	Classification 9th–12th

Source: Results

Date		Score		Set 1	Set 2	Set 3	Set 4	Set 5	Total
21 Sep	India	3–0	Hong Kong	15–6	15–4	15–5			45–15
21 Sep	South Korea	3–0	Bahrain	15–2	15–3	15–2			45–7
21 Sep	Saudi Arabia	3–0	Indonesia	15–6	15–5	15–2			45–13
22 Sep	Hong Kong	0–3	Indonesia	3–15	4–15	8–15			15–45
22 Sep	India	3–0	Bahrain	15–2	15–4	15–8			45–14
22 Sep	South Korea	3–0	Saudi Arabia	15–5	15–2	15–1			45–8
23 Sep	Saudi Arabia	1–3	India	8–15	6–15	15–12	7–15		36–57
23 Sep	South Korea	3–0	Indonesia	15–3	15–1	15–5			45–9
23 Sep	Bahrain	3–0	Hong Kong	15–5	15–3	15–6			45–14
24 Sep	South Korea	3–0	Hong Kong	15–6	15–4	15–0			45–10
24 Sep	Bahrain	2–3	Saudi Arabia	15–13	11–15	15–10	9–15	2–15	52–68
24 Sep	India	3–0	Indonesia	15–10	15–5	15–5			45–20
25 Sep	Indonesia	1–3	Bahrain	4–15	15–6	11–15	11–15		41–51
25 Sep	Hong Kong	0–3	Saudi Arabia	3–15	8–15	2–15			13–45
25 Sep	South Korea	3–0	India	15–9	15–11	15–5			45–25

==== Pool B ====
Pos	Team	Pld	W	L	Pts	SW	SL	SR	SPW	SPL	SPR	Qualification
1	China	5	5	0	10	15	1	15.000	234	76	3.079	Final round
2	Japan	5	4	1	9	13	6	2.167	234	150	1.560	Final round
3	Kuwait	5	3	2	8	10	7	1.429	198	196	1.010	Classification 5th–8th
4	Pakistan	5	2	3	7	8	9	0.889	183	195	0.938	Classification 5th–8th
5	Thailand	5	1	4	6	4	12	0.333	153	205	0.746	Classification 9th–12th
6	Nepal	5	0	5	5	0	15	0.000	45	225	0.200	Classification 9th–12th

Source: Results

Date		Score		Set 1	Set 2	Set 3	Set 4	Set 5	Total
21 Sep	Japan	3–1	Pakistan	4–15	15–2	15–1	15–4		49–22
21 Sep	China	3–0	Nepal	15–2	15–1	15–1			45–4
21 Sep	Kuwait	3–0	Thailand	15–12	15–13	15–2			45–27
22 Sep	Pakistan	3–0	Thailand	15–12	18–16	15–6			48–34
22 Sep	Nepal	0–3	Kuwait	6–15	2–15	7–15			15–45
22 Sep	Japan	1–3	China	2–15	15–9	5–15	9–15		31–54
23 Sep	Kuwait	1–3	Japan	12–15	15–12	7–15	5–15		39–57
23 Sep	China	3–0	Pakistan	15–9	15–2	15–5			45–16
23 Sep	Thailand	3–0	Nepal	15–9	15–2	15–4			45–15
24 Sep	China	3–0	Kuwait	15–1	15–0	15–8			45–9
24 Sep	Pakistan	3–0	Nepal	15–4	15–0	15–3			45–7
24 Sep	Japan	3–1	Thailand	15–6	7–15	15–8	15–2		52–31
25 Sep	Nepal	0–3	Japan	1–15	1–15	2–15			4–45
25 Sep	Thailand	0–3	China	8–15	5–15	3–15			16–45
25 Sep	Kuwait	3–1	Pakistan	16–14	15–12	14–16	15–10		60–52

=== Classification 9th–12th ===
Pos	Team	Pld	W	L	Pts	SW	SL	SR	SPW	SPL	SPR
1	Thailand	3	3	0	6	9	1	9.000	142	66	2.152
2	Indonesia	3	2	1	5	7	3	2.333	133	86	1.547
3	Hong Kong	3	1	2	4	3	6	0.500	79	105	0.752
4	Nepal	3	0	3	3	0	9	0.000	38	135	0.281

Source: Results

Date		Score		Set 1	Set 2	Set 3	Set 4	Set 5	Total
27 Sep	Indonesia	3–0	Nepal	15–3	15–6	15–5			45–14
27 Sep	Thailand	3–0	Hong Kong	15–4	15–1	15–9			45–14
30 Sep	Hong Kong	3–0	Nepal	15–8	15–6	15–1			45–15
30 Sep	Indonesia	1–3	Thailand	11–15	15–7	7–15	10–15		43–52
02 Oct	Thailand	3–0	Nepal	15–1	15–5	15–3			45–9
02 Oct	Hong Kong	0–3	Indonesia	9–15	8–15	3–15			20–45

=== Classification 5th–8th ===
Pos	Team	Pld	W	L	Pts	SW	SL	SR	SPW	SPL	SPR
1	Saudi Arabia	3	2	1	5	7	5	1.400	152	143	1.063
2	Kuwait	3	2	1	5	7	6	1.167	153	149	1.027
3	Bahrain	3	1	2	4	6	7	0.857	155	160	0.969
4	Pakistan	3	1	2	4	5	7	0.714	143	151	0.947

Source: Results

Date		Score		Set 1	Set 2	Set 3	Set 4	Set 5	Total
28 Sep	Bahrain	1–3	Pakistan	13–15	15–7	9–15	6–15		43–52
28 Sep	Saudi Arabia	3–1	Kuwait	15–7	15–4	6–15	15–12		51–38
01 Oct	Pakistan	1–3	Saudi Arabia	7–15	16–18	15–4	13–15		51–52
01 Oct	Bahrain	2–3	Kuwait	15–9	10–15	15–5	11–15	7–15	58–59
03 Oct	Saudi Arabia	1–3	Bahrain	11–15	9–15	15–8	14–16		49–54
03 Oct	Kuwait	3–1	Pakistan	15–5	15–9	11–15	15–11		56–40

=== Final round ===
Pos	Team	Pld	W	L	Pts	SW	SL	SR	SPW	SPL	SPR
1	China	3	3	0	6	9	1	9.000	145	67	2.164
2	South Korea	3	2	1	5	7	3	2.333	121	110	1.100
3	India	3	1	2	4	3	6	0.500	82	115	0.713
4	Japan	3	0	3	3	0	9	0.000	79	135	0.585

Source: Results

Date		Score		Set 1	Set 2	Set 3	Set 4	Set 5	Total
01 Oct	South Korea	1–3	China	15–10	10–15	1–15	5–15		31–55
01 Oct	India	3–0	Japan	15–8	15–11	15–6			45–25
02 Oct	China	3–0	Japan	15–12	15–3	15–5			45–20
02 Oct	South Korea	3–0	India	15–2	15–8	15–11			45–21
04 Oct	India	0–3	China	3–15	5–15	8–15			16–45
04 Oct	Japan	0–3	South Korea	11–15	10–15	13–15			34–45

== Final standing ==
Rank	Team	Pld	W	L
1st place, gold medalist(s)	China	8	8	0
2nd place, silver medalist(s)	South Korea	8	7	1
3rd place, bronze medalist(s)	India	8	5	3
4	Japan	8	4	4
5	Saudi Arabia	8	5	3
6	Kuwait	8	5	3
7	Bahrain	8	3	5
8	Pakistan	8	3	5
9	Thailand	8	4	4
10	Indonesia	8	3	5
11	Hong Kong	8	1	7
12	Nepal	8	0	8
