= Volleyball at the Asian Games =

- Governing bodies: FIVB (World) / AVC (Asia)
- Events: 2 (men: 1; women: 1)

Games
- 1951; 1954; 1958; 1962; 1966; 1970; 1974; 1978; 1982; 1986; 1990; 1994; 1998; 2002; 2006; 2010; 2014; 2018; 2022; 2026
- Medalists

Volleyball for men is played at the Asian Games since the 1958 edition in Tokyo, Japan. Women event is played since the 1962 edition in Jakarta, Indonesia.

== Volleyball ==
=== Summary ===
==== Men ====
#	Year	Host	Final			Third place match			Teams
#	Year	Host	Champions	Score	Runners-up	3rd place	Score	4th place	Teams
1	1958	(Japan); Tokyo	Japan	No playoffs	Iran	India	No playoffs	Philippines	5
2	1962	(Indonesia); Jakarta	Japan	No playoffs	India	Pakistan	No playoffs	Indonesia	9
3	1966	(Thailand); Bangkok	Japan	No playoffs	South Korea	Iran	No playoffs	India	12
4	1970	(Thailand); Bangkok	Japan	No playoffs	South Korea	Republic of China	No playoffs	Khmer Republic	8
5	1974	(Iran); Tehran	Japan	3–1	South Korea	China	3–1	Iran	8
6	1978	(Thailand); Bangkok	South Korea	No playoffs	Japan	China	No playoffs	Burma	15
7	1982	(India); New Delhi	Japan	No playoffs	China	South Korea	No playoffs	India	15
8	1986	(South Korea); Seoul	China	No playoffs	South Korea	India	No playoffs	Japan	12
9	1990	(China); Beijing	China	3–1	South Korea	Japan	3–0	North Korea	9
10	1994	(Japan); Hiroshima	Japan	3–2	China	South Korea	3–0	Kazakhstan	7
11	1998	(Thailand); Bangkok	China	3–1	South Korea	Chinese Taipei	3–2	Japan	10
12	2002	(South Korea); Busan	South Korea	3–0	Iran	Japan	3–2	China	9
13	2006	(Qatar); Doha	South Korea	3–1	China	Saudi Arabia	3–2	Qatar	19
14	2010	(China); Guangzhou	Japan	3–1	Iran	South Korea	3–0	Thailand	18
15	2014	(South Korea); Incheon	Iran	3–1	Japan	South Korea	3–1	China	16
16	2018	(Indonesia); Jakarta–Palembang	Iran	3–0	South Korea	Chinese Taipei	3–1	Qatar	20
17	2022	(China); Hangzhou	Iran	3–1	China	Japan	3–1	Qatar	19
18	2026	(Japan); Aichi–Nagoya	Iran	3–1	Japan	Pakistan	3–0	China	16

Medal table

Rank	Nation	Gold	Silver	Bronze	Total
1	Japan	8	3	3	14
2	Iran	4	3	1	8
3	South Korea	3	7	4	14
4	China	3	4	2	9
5	India	0	1	2	3
6	Chinese Taipei	0	0	3	3
7	Pakistan	0	0	2	2
8	Saudi Arabia	0	0	1	1
Totals (8 entries)		18	18	18	54

==== Women ====
#	Year	Host	Final			Third place match			Teams
#	Year	Host	Champions	Score	Runners-up	3rd place	Score	4th place	Teams
1	1962	(Indonesia); Jakarta	Japan	No playoffs	South Korea	Indonesia	No playoffs	Philippines	4
2	1966	(Thailand); Bangkok	Japan	No playoffs	South Korea	Iran	No playoffs	Philippines	6
3	1970	(Thailand); Bangkok	Japan	No playoffs	South Korea	Khmer Republic	No playoffs	Iran	8
4	1974	(Iran); Tehran	Japan	No playoffs	South Korea	China	No playoffs	North Korea	5
5	1978	(Thailand); Bangkok	Japan	No playoffs	China	South Korea	No playoffs	North Korea	6
6	1982	(India); New Delhi	China	No playoffs	Japan	South Korea	No playoffs	North Korea	6
7	1986	(South Korea); Seoul	China	No playoffs	Japan	South Korea	No playoffs	Thailand	5
8	1990	(China); Beijing	China	No playoffs	South Korea	Japan	No playoffs	North Korea	6
9	1994	(Japan); Hiroshima	South Korea	No playoffs	China	Japan	No playoffs	Chinese Taipei	6
10	1998	(Thailand); Bangkok	China	3–1	South Korea	Japan	3–0	Thailand	6
11	2002	(South Korea); Busan	China	3–1	South Korea	Japan	No playoffs	Chinese Taipei	6
12	2006	(Qatar); Doha	China	3–1	Japan	Chinese Taipei	3–0	Thailand	9
13	2010	(China); Guangzhou	China	3–2	South Korea	Kazakhstan	3–0	North Korea	11
14	2014	(South Korea); Incheon	South Korea	3–0	China	Thailand	3–0	Japan	9
15	2018	(Indonesia); Jakarta–Palembang	China	3–0	Thailand	South Korea	3–1	Japan	11
16	2022	(China); Hangzhou	China	3–0	Japan	Thailand	3–0	Vietnam	13
17	2026	(Japan); Aichi–Nagoya	China	3–0	Japan	Thailand	3–0	South Korea	14

Medal table

Rank	Nation	Gold	Silver	Bronze	Total
1	China	10	3	1	14
2	Japan	5	5	4	14
3	South Korea	2	8	4	14
4	Thailand	0	1	3	4
5	Cambodia	0	0	1	1
5	Chinese Taipei	0	0	1	1
5	Indonesia	0	0	1	1
5	Iran	0	0	1	1
5	Kazakhstan	0	0	1	1
Totals (9 entries)		17	17	17	51

=== Participating nations ===
==== Men ====
Team	(Japan) 1958	(Indonesia) 1962	(Thailand) 1966	(Thailand) 1970	(Iran) 1974	(Thailand) 1978	(India) 1982	(South Korea) 1986	(China) 1990	(Japan) 1994	(Thailand) 1998	(South Korea) 2002	(Qatar) 2006	(China) 2010	(South Korea) 2014	(Indonesia) 2018	(China) 2022	(Japan) 2026	Years
Afghanistan	•	•	•	•	•	•	•	•	•	•	•	•	•	•	•	•	19th	•	1
Bahrain	•	•	•	•	•	13th	•	7th	•	•	•	•	8th	•	•	•	12th	•	4
Bangladesh	•	•	•	•	•	11th	13th	•	•	•	•	•	•	•	•	•	•	•	2
Cambodia	•	7th	•	4th	•	•	•	•	•	•	•	•	•	•	•	•	13th	•	3
China	•	•	•	•	3rd	3rd	2nd	1st	1st	2nd	1st	4th	2nd	5th	4th	9th	2nd	4th	14
Chinese Taipei	•	•	7th	3rd	•	•	•	•	•	•	3rd	6th	9th	11th	9th	3rd	11th	9th	10
Hong Kong	5th	•	•	•	•	14th	14th	11th	8th	•	•	•	13th	17th	15th	19th	13th	16th	11
India	3rd	2nd	4th	•	5th	7th	4th	3rd	•	•	7th	5th	9th	6th	5th	12th	6th	6th	15
Indonesia	•	4th	5th	6th	•	•	6th	10th	•	•	6th	•	•	13th		6th	8th	10th	10
Iran	2nd	•	3rd	5th	4th	•	•	•	•	5th	•	2nd	6th	2nd	1st	1st	1st	1st	12
Iraq	•	•	•	•	•	5th	5th	•	•	•	•	•	•	•	•	•	•	•	2
Japan	1st	1st	1st	1st	1st	2nd	1st	4th	3rd	1st	4th	3rd	5th	1st	2nd	5th	3rd	2nd	18
Kazakhstan	•	•	•	•	•	•	•	•	•	4th	8th	•	7th	9th	10th	17th	9th	9th	8
Kuwait	•	•	•	•	8th	6th	7th	6th	•	•	•	•	11th	12th	8th	•	•	•	7
Kyrgyzstan	•	•	•	•	•	•	•	•	•	•	•	•	•	•	•	16th	13th	14th	3
Lebanon	•	•	•	•	•	•	•	•	•	•	•	•	13th	•	•	•	•	•	1
Macau	•	•	•	•	•	•	•	•	•	•	•	9th	15th	•	•	•	•	•	2
Malaysia	•	•	12th	•	•	•	•	•	•	•	•	•	•	•	•	•	•	•	1
Maldives	•	•	•	•	•	•	15th	•	•	•	•	•	17th	•	16th	20th	•	•	4
Mongolia	•	•	•	•	•	•	•	•	•	7th	•	•	17th	17th	•	18th	13th	•	5
Myanmar	•	6th	•	•	•	4th	•	•	9th	•	•	•	•	14th	14th	11th	•	•	6
Nepal	•	•	•	•	•	15th	12th	12th	•	•	•	•	•	•	•	15th	13th	•	5
North Korea	•	•	•	•	•	•	•	•	4th	•	•	•	•	•	•	•	•	•	1
North Yemen	•	•	•	•	•	•	11th	•	•	•	•	•	•	•	•	•	•	•	1
Pakistan	•	3rd	9th	8th	7th	9th	•	8th	5th	6th	9th	7th	•	10th	11th	8th	5th	3rd	15
Palestine	•	•	•	•	•	•	•	•	•	•	•	•	17th	•	•	•	•	•	1
Philippines	4th	9th	8th	•	6th	•	•	•	•	•	•	•	•	•	•	•	13th	13th	6
Qatar	•	•	•	•	•	•	8th	•	•	•	10th	8th	4th	8th	6th	4th	4th	8th	9
Saudi Arabia	•	•	•	•	•	8th	9th	5th	6th	•	•	•	3rd	7th	12th	10th	•	•	8
South Korea	•	5th	2nd	2nd	2nd	1st	3rd	2nd	2nd	3rd	2nd	1st	1st	3rd	3rd	2nd	7th	7th	17
South Yemen	•	•	•	•	•	•	10th	•	•	•	•	•	•	•	•	•	•	•	1
Sri Lanka	•	•	11th	•	•	•	•	•	•	•	•	•	•	•	•	13th	•	•	2
Thailand	•	8th	6th	7th	•	10th	•	9th	•	•	5th	•	11th	4th	7th	7th	10th	5th	11
Turkmenistan	•	•	•	•	•	•	•	•	•	•	•	•	•	15th	13th	•	•	•	2
United Arab Emirates	•	•	•	•	•	12th	•	•	•	•	•	•	15th	•	•	•	•	•	2
Uzbekistan	•	•	•	•	•	•	•	•	•	•	•	•	•	•	•	•	•	15th	1
Vietnam	•	•	10th	•	•	•	•	•	7th	•	•	•	•	16th	•	14th	•	10th	5
Teams (37)	5	9	12	8	8	15	15	12	9	7	10	9	19	18	16	20	19	16	_

==== Women ====
Team	(Indonesia) 1962	(Thailand) 1966	(Thailand) 1970	(Iran) 1974	(Thailand) 1978	(India) 1982	(South Korea) 1986	(China) 1990	(Japan) 1994	(Thailand) 1998	(South Korea) 2002	(Qatar) 2006	(China) 2010	(South Korea) 2014	(Indonesia) 2018	(China) 2022	(Japan) 2026	Years
Afghanistan	•	•	•	•	•	•	•	•	•	•	•	•	•	•	•	13th	•	1
Cambodia	•	•	3rd	•	•	•	•	•	•	•	•	•	•	•	•	•	•	1
China	•	•	•	3rd	2nd	1st	1st	1st	2nd	1st	1st	1st	1st	2nd	1st	1st	1st	14
Chinese Taipei	•	•	5th	•	•	•	•	5th	4th	5th	4th	3rd	7th	5th	9th	6th	5th	11
Hong Kong	•	•	•	•	6th	•	•	•	•	•	•	•	•	7th	11th	10th	10th	4
India	•	•	•	•	•	6th	•	•	•	•	•	•	9th	8th	10th	9th	•	5
Indonesia	3rd	•	7th	•	•	•	5th	•	•	•	•	•	•	•	7th	•	6th	5
Iran	•	3rd	4th	5th	•	•	•	•	•	•	•	•	•	•	•	•	•	3
Japan	1st	1st	1st	1st	1st	2nd	2nd	3rd	3rd	3rd	3rd	2nd	6th	4th	4th	2nd	2nd	17
Kazakhstan	•	•	•	•	•	•	•	•	•	6th	6th	6th	3rd	6th	5th	8th	8th	8
Kyrgyzstan	•	•	•	•	•	•	•	•	•	•	•	•	•	•	•	•	13th	1
Maldives	•	•	•	•	•	•	•	•	•	•	•	•	10th	9th	•	•	•	2
Mongolia	•	•	•	•	•	•	•	•	6th	•	•	8th	8th	•	•	12th	11th	5
Myanmar	•	6th	•	•	•	•	•	•	•	•	•	•	•	•	•	•	•	1
Nepal	•	•	•	•	•	•	•	•	•	•	•	•	•	•	•	11th	12th	2
North Korea	•	•	•	4th	4th	4th	•	4th	•	•	•	•	4th	•	•	7th	•	6
Philippines	4th	4th	6th	•	•	5th	•	•	•	•	•	•	•	•	8th	•	9th	6
Qatar	•	•	•	•	•	•	•	•	•	•	•	•	•	•	•	•	14th	1
South Korea	2nd	2nd	2nd	2nd	3rd	3rd	3rd	2nd	1st	2nd	2nd	5th	2nd	1st	3rd	5th	4th	17
Tajikistan	•	•	•	•	•	•	•	•	•	•	•	9th	11th	•	•	•	•	2
Thailand	•	5th	8th	•	5th	•	4th	6th	5th	4th	5th	4th	5th	3rd	2nd	3rd	3rd	14
Vietnam	•	•	•	•	•	•	•	•	•	•	•	7th	•	•	6th	4th	7th	4
Teams (22)	4	6	8	5	6	6	5	6	6	6	6	9	11	9	11	13	14	_

== Nine-a-side volleyball ==
=== Summary ===
==== Men ====
#	Year	Host	Final			Third place match			Teams
#	Year	Host	Champions	Score	Runners-up	3rd place	Score	4th place	Teams
1	1958	(Japan); Tokyo	Japan	No playoffs	South Korea	Republic of China	No playoffs	Hong Kong	5
2	1962	(Indonesia); Jakarta	Japan	No playoffs	South Korea	Philippines	No playoffs	Indonesia	6

==== Women ====
#	Year	Host	Final			Third place match			Teams
#	Year	Host	Champions	Score	Runners-up	3rd place	Score	4th place	Teams
1	1962	(Indonesia); Jakarta	Japan	No playoffs	South Korea	Indonesia	No playoffs	Philippines	4

=== Participating nations ===
==== Men ====
Team	(Japan) 1958	(Indonesia) 1962	Years
Chinese Taipei	3rd	•	1
Hong Kong	4th	•	1
Indonesia	•	4th	1
Japan	1st	1st	2
Malaysia	•	6th	1
Philippines	5th	3rd	2
Singapore	•	5th	1
South Korea	2nd	2nd	2
Teams (8)	5	6	_

==== Women ====
Team	(Indonesia) 1962	Years
Indonesia	3rd	1
Japan	1st	1
Philippines	4th	1
South Korea	2nd	1
Teams (4)	4	_

== Total medal table ==
Rank	Nation	Gold	Silver	Bronze	Total
1	Japan (JPN)	16	8	7	31
2	China (CHN)	13	7	3	23
3	South Korea (KOR)	5	18	8	31
4	Iran (IRI)	4	3	2	9
5	Thailand (THA)	0	1	3	4
6	India (IND)	0	1	2	3
7	Chinese Taipei (TPE)	0	0	5	5
8	Indonesia (INA)	0	0	2	2
8	Pakistan (PAK)	0	0	2	2
10	Cambodia (CAM)	0	0	1	1
10	Kazakhstan (KAZ)	0	0	1	1
10	Philippines (PHI)	0	0	1	1
10	Saudi Arabia (KSA)	0	0	1	1
Totals (13 entries)		38	38	38	114
