= Seo Jae-duck =

South Korean volleyball player (born 1989)

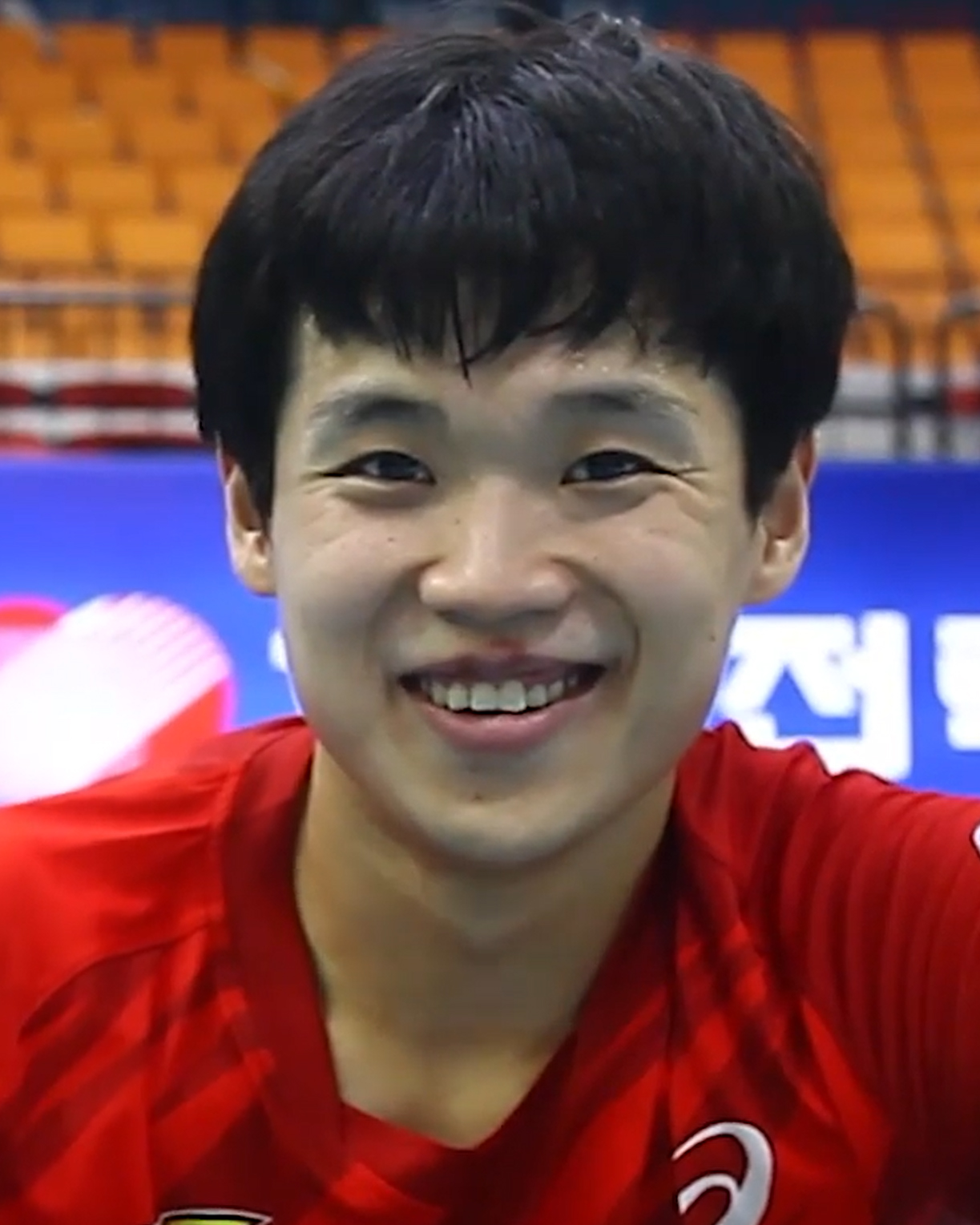
- Seo in 2018

Personal information
- Nationality: South Korean
- Born: 21 July 1989 (age 37); Gwangju, South Korea
- Height: 1.95 m (6 ft 5 in)
- Weight: 98 kg (216 lb)
- Spike: 315 cm (124 in)
- Block: 305 cm (120 in)

Volleyball information
- Position: Outside / Opposite Spiker
- Current club: (South Korea) Suwon KEPCO Vixtorm
- Number: 1

Career
Years	Teams
2011–	(South Korea) Suwon KEPCO Vixtorm

National team
2009–	South Korea
Honours
Representing South Korea
Asian Games
Silver medal – second place	2018 Jakarta
Bronze medal – third place	2014 Incheon
AVC Cup
Gold medal – first place	2014 Almaty

- Seo Jae-duck
- Hangul: 서재덕
- RR: Seo Jaedeok
- MR: Sŏ Chaedŏk

Seo Jae-duck (Korean: 서재덕, born July 21, 1989) is a volleyball player from South Korea, who plays as for the Men's National Team from 2009 Summer Universiade. Current, he plays as an Outside spiker for the Suwon KEPCO Vixtorm.
