= Igor Arbutina =

Croatian volleyball coach

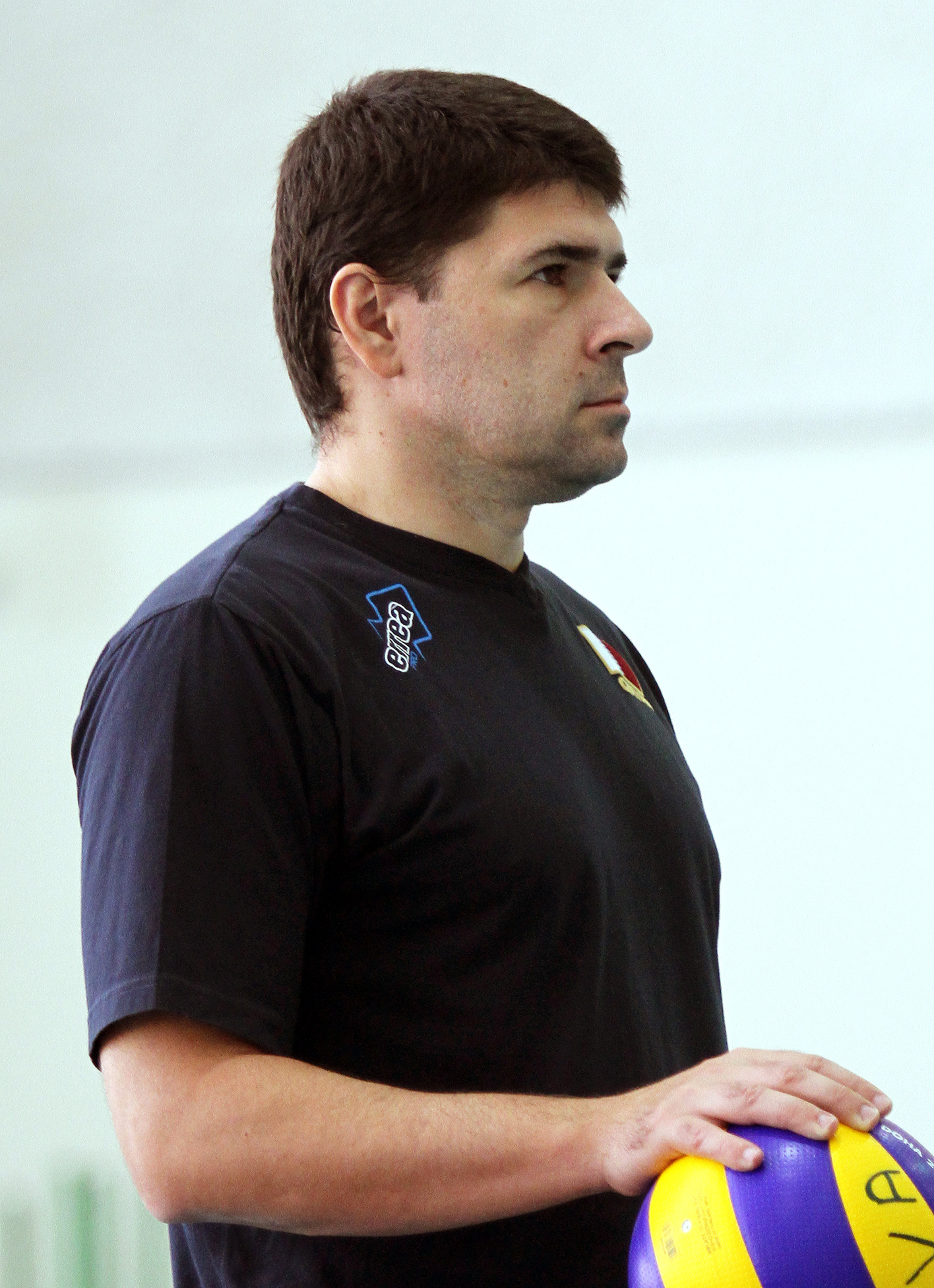
- Arbutina in 2012

Personal information
- Born: 27 July 1972 (age 54); Zagreb, Croatia
- Hometown: Zagreb Croatia

Volleyball information
- Current club: Al Rayyan (head coach)
Honours
Representing Croatia
Mediterranean Games
| Bronze medal – third place | 1997 Bari | Team competition |
Representing Qatar [Al Rayyan SC]
FIVB Volleyball Men's Club World Championship
| Silver medal – second place | 2014 Belo Horizonte | Team competition |

Igor Arbutina (born 27 July 1972) is a Croatian volleyball coach.

== Career ==
Between 1992 and 2002 Arbutina worked as a coach at OK Karlovac, HAOK Mladost and OK Varazdin. From 1997 to 2002 he was an assistant coach of Croatian national team, and in 2002 became the head coach. In 2003–2007 he worked with MSC Moers and Rote Raben Vilsbiburg in Germany, and then became the head coach of the national team of Qatar.

== Career ==
- (Croatia) OK Karlovac (1992–1993)
- (Croatia) OK Varazdin (1994–1996) (youth categories)
- (Croatia) OK Akademicar/HAOK Mladost (1996–1999)
- (France) Evreux VC (1999–2000)
- (Croatia) HAOK Mladost (2000–2002)
- (Croatia) OK Varazdin (2003)
- (Germany) MSC Moers (2003–2006)
- (Germany) Rote Raben Vilsbiburg (2006–2007)
- (Qatar) Al Rayyan SC (2009–2011)
- (Qatar) Al Rayyan SC (2012)
- (Qatar) Al Rayyan SC (2014)
- (Qatar) Al Rayyan SC (2015/2016)
- Croatia (Junior national team) (2000–2002)
- Croatia Assistant Coach (1997–2001)
- Croatia (2002)
- Qatar (2007–2010)
- Qatar (2012–2014)
