= Volleyball at the 2019 South Asian Games =

- Venue: Tripureshwor Covered Hall

Volleyball at the 2019 South Asian Games is being held in Kathmandu, Nepal from 27 November to 3 December 2019.

== Medalists ==
Event	Gold	Silver	Bronze
Men	India	Pakistan	Sri Lanka
Women	India	Nepal	Sri Lanka

== Draw ==
=== Men ===
Group A

- India
- Bangladesh
- Nepal (Host)

Group B

- Pakistan
- Sri Lanka
- Maldives

=== Women ===
Group A

- India
- Bangladesh
- Nepal (Host)

Group B

- Sri Lanka
- Pakistan
- Maldives
