= Volleyball at the 1998 Asian Games – Men's tournament =

Men at the 1998 Asian Games
- Venue: Impact Arena
- Date: 7–15 December 1998
- Nations: 10

Medalists
| gold medal | China |
| silver medal | South Korea |
| bronze medal | Chinese Taipei |

This page presents the results of the men's volleyball tournament at the 1998 Asian Games, which was held from Monday December 7 to Tuesday December 15, 1998 in Bangkok, Thailand. The men's volleyball event was contested for the eleventh time at the Asian Games.

== Results ==
=== Preliminary round ===
==== Pool A ====
| Pos | Team | Pld | W | L | Pts | SW | SL | SR | SPW | SPL | SPR | Qualification |
|---|---|---|---|---|---|---|---|---|---|---|---|---|
| 1 | South Korea | 4 | 4 | 0 | 8 | 12 | 0 | MAX | 180 | 84 | 2.143 | Semifinals |
| 2 | Chinese Taipei | 4 | 3 | 1 | 7 | 9 | 3 | 3.000 | 168 | 124 | 1.355 | Semifinals |
| 3 | Thailand | 4 | 2 | 2 | 6 | 6 | 7 | 0.857 | 157 | 156 | 1.006 | Classification 5th–8th |
| 4 | Indonesia | 4 | 1 | 3 | 5 | 4 | 9 | 0.444 | 131 | 184 | 0.712 | Classification 5th–8th |
| 5 | Qatar | 4 | 0 | 4 | 4 | 0 | 12 | 0.000 | 92 | 180 | 0.511 | Classification 9th–10th |

Source: Results

| Date | | Score | | Set 1 | Set 2 | Set 3 | Set 4 | Set 5 | Total |
|---|---|---|---|---|---|---|---|---|---|
| 07 Dec | Qatar | 0–3 | South Korea | 3–15 | 7–15 | 6–15 | | | 16–45 |
| 07 Dec | Thailand | 3–1 | Indonesia | 14–16 | 16–14 | 15–8 | 15–8 | | 60–46 |
| 08 Dec | Qatar | 0–3 | Indonesia | 11–15 | 13–15 | 10–15 | | | 34–45 |
| 08 Dec | Chinese Taipei | 3–0 | Thailand | 15–7 | 15–13 | 15–10 | | | 45–30 |
| 09 Dec | Qatar | 0–3 | Chinese Taipei | 6–15 | 8–15 | 8–15 | | | 22–45 |
| 09 Dec | Indonesia | 0–3 | South Korea | 1–15 | 7–15 | 5–15 | | | 13–45 |
| 11 Dec | Indonesia | 0–3 | Chinese Taipei | 10–15 | 11–15 | 6–15 | | | 27–45 |
| 11 Dec | South Korea | 3–0 | Thailand | 15–8 | 15–10 | 15–4 | | | 45–22 |
| 12 Dec | Chinese Taipei | 0–3 | South Korea | 11–15 | 13–15 | 9–15 | | | 33–45 |
| 12 Dec | Thailand | 3–0 | Qatar | 15–7 | 15–5 | 15–8 | | | 45–20 |

==== Pool B ====
| Pos | Team | Pld | W | L | Pts | SW | SL | SR | SPW | SPL | SPR | Qualification |
|---|---|---|---|---|---|---|---|---|---|---|---|---|
| 1 | China | 4 | 4 | 0 | 8 | 12 | 1 | 12.000 | 195 | 117 | 1.667 | Semifinals |
| 2 | Japan | 4 | 3 | 1 | 7 | 10 | 3 | 3.333 | 172 | 125 | 1.376 | Semifinals |
| 3 | India | 4 | 2 | 2 | 6 | 6 | 6 | 1.000 | 130 | 139 | 0.935 | Classification 5th–8th |
| 4 | Kazakhstan | 4 | 1 | 3 | 5 | 3 | 9 | 0.333 | 125 | 161 | 0.776 | Classification 5th–8th |
| 5 | Pakistan | 4 | 0 | 4 | 4 | 0 | 12 | 0.000 | 103 | 183 | 0.563 | Classification 9th–10th |

Source: Results

| Date | | Score | | Set 1 | Set 2 | Set 3 | Set 4 | Set 5 | Total |
|---|---|---|---|---|---|---|---|---|---|
| 07 Dec | India | 0–3 | China | 9–15 | 7–15 | 11–15 | | | 27–45 |
| 07 Dec | Kazakhstan | 3–0 | Pakistan | 15–9 | 15–3 | 16–14 | | | 46–26 |
| 08 Dec | Pakistan | 0–3 | China | 9–15 | 9–15 | 14–16 | | | 32–46 |
| 08 Dec | India | 0–3 | Japan | 3–15 | 4–15 | 6–15 | | | 13–45 |
| 09 Dec | Kazakhstan | 0–3 | India | 11–15 | 7–15 | 9–15 | | | 27–45 |
| 09 Dec | China | 3–1 | Japan | 15–3 | 14–16 | 15–9 | 15–8 | | 59–36 |
| 11 Dec | Pakistan | 0–3 | Japan | 7–15 | 2–15 | 14–16 | | | 23–46 |
| 11 Dec | China | 3–0 | Kazakhstan | 15–11 | 15–8 | 15–3 | | | 45–22 |
| 12 Dec | India | 3–0 | Pakistan | 15–4 | 15–7 | 15–11 | | | 45–22 |
| 12 Dec | Japan | 3–0 | Kazakhstan | 15–13 | 15–7 | 15–10 | | | 45–30 |

=== Classification 9th–10th ===
| Date | | Score | | Set 1 | Set 2 | Set 3 | Set 4 | Set 5 | Total |
|---|---|---|---|---|---|---|---|---|---|
| 14 Dec | Qatar | 0–3 | Pakistan | 11–15 | 8–15 | 7–15 | | | 26–45 |

=== Classification 5th–8th ===
Semifinals
13 December
Thailand | 3
Kazakhstan | 1
13 December
India | 0
Indonesia | 3

Classification 5th–6th
14 December
Thailand | 3
Indonesia | 0
Classification 7th–8th
14 December
Kazakhstan | 0
India | 3

==== Semifinals ====
| Date | | Score | | Set 1 | Set 2 | Set 3 | Set 4 | Set 5 | Total |
|---|---|---|---|---|---|---|---|---|---|
| 13 Dec | Thailand | 3–1 | Kazakhstan | 9–15 | 15–3 | 15–5 | 15–4 | | 54–27 |
| 13 Dec | India | 0–3 | Indonesia | 12–15 | 5–15 | 14–16 | | | 31–46 |

==== Classification 7th–8th ====
| Date | | Score | | Set 1 | Set 2 | Set 3 | Set 4 | Set 5 | Total |
|---|---|---|---|---|---|---|---|---|---|
| 14 Dec | Kazakhstan | 0–3 | India | 6–15 | 0–15 | 11–15 | | | 17–45 |

==== Classification 5th–6th ====
| Date | | Score | | Set 1 | Set 2 | Set 3 | Set 4 | Set 5 | Total |
|---|---|---|---|---|---|---|---|---|---|
| 14 Dec | Thailand | 3–0 | Indonesia | 17–16 | 15–6 | 15–8 | | | 47–30 |

=== Final round ===
Semifinals
13 December
South Korea | 3
Japan | 1
13 December
China | 3
Chinese Taipei | 0

Final
15 December
South Korea | 1
China | 3
Bronze medal match
15 December
Japan | 2
Chinese Taipei | 3

==== Semifinals ====
| Date | | Score | | Set 1 | Set 2 | Set 3 | Set 4 | Set 5 | Total |
|---|---|---|---|---|---|---|---|---|---|
| 13 Dec | South Korea | 3–1 | Japan | 15–11 | 13–15 | 15–3 | 15–6 | | 58–35 |
| 13 Dec | China | 3–0 | Chinese Taipei | 15–11 | 15–4 | 15–11 | | | 45–26 |

==== Bronze medal match ====
| Date | | Score | | Set 1 | Set 2 | Set 3 | Set 4 | Set 5 | Total |
|---|---|---|---|---|---|---|---|---|---|
| 15 Dec | Japan | 2–3 | Chinese Taipei | 15–6 | 12–15 | 15–13 | 5–15 | 8–15 | 55–64 |

==== Final ====
| Date | | Score | | Set 1 | Set 2 | Set 3 | Set 4 | Set 5 | Total |
|---|---|---|---|---|---|---|---|---|---|
| 15 Dec | South Korea | 1–3 | China | 7–15 | 11–15 | 15–10 | 9–15 | | 42–55 |

== Final standing ==
| Rank | Team | Pld | W | L |
|---|---|---|---|---|
| 1st place, gold medalist(s) | China | 6 | 6 | 0 |
| 2nd place, silver medalist(s) | South Korea | 6 | 5 | 1 |
| 3rd place, bronze medalist(s) | Chinese Taipei | 6 | 4 | 2 |
| 4 | Japan | 6 | 3 | 3 |
| 5 | Thailand | 6 | 4 | 2 |
| 6 | Indonesia | 6 | 2 | 4 |
| 7 | India | 6 | 3 | 3 |
| 8 | Kazakhstan | 6 | 1 | 5 |
| 9 | Pakistan | 5 | 1 | 4 |
| 10 | Qatar | 5 | 0 | 5 |
