= Mehdi Marandi =

Iranian volleyball player (born 1986)

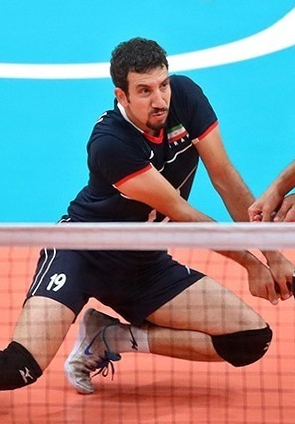
- Marandi at the 2016 Olympics

Personal information
- Full name: Mehdi Marandi
- Born: May 12, 1986 (age 40); Qazvin, Iran
- Height: 1.72 m (5 ft 8 in)
- Weight: 69 kg (152 lb)
- Spike: 2.95 m (116 in)
- Block: 2.80 m (110 in)

Volleyball information
- Position: Libero
- Current club: Paykan Tehran VC
Honours
Representing Iran
Men's volleyball
World Grand Champions Cup
Bronze medal – third place	2017 Japan	Team
Asian Games
Gold medal – first place	2018 Jakarta–Palembang	Team

Mehdi Marandi (Persian: مهدی مرندی, born 12 May 1986 in Ghazvin) also known as Siamak Marandi or Mahdi Marandi, is an Iranian volleyball player who plays as a libero for the Iran national team. He competed at the Rio 2016 Summer Olympics.

== Honours ==
=== National team ===
- World Grand Champions Cup
  - Bronze medal (1): 2017
- Asian Games
  - Gold medal (1): 2018
