= Kim Kyu-min =

South Korean volleyball player (born 1990)

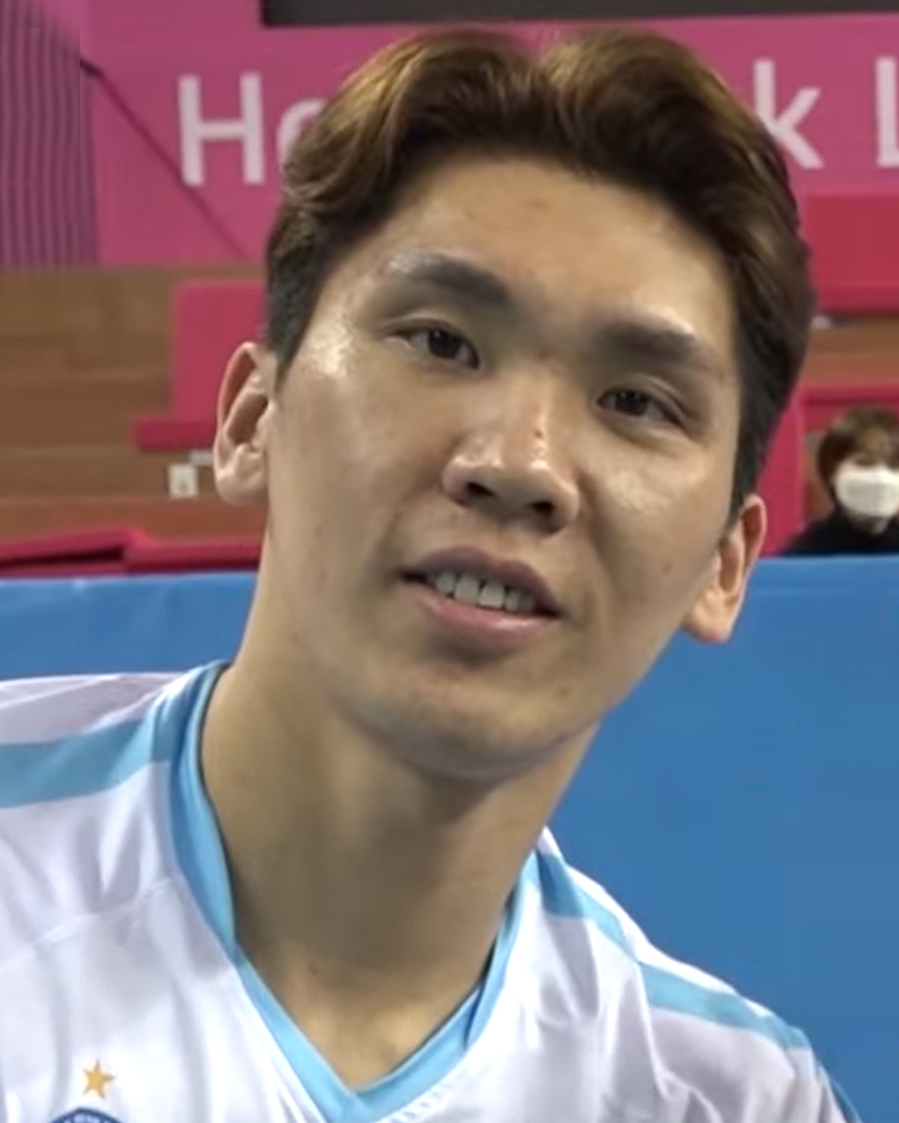
- Kim in 2020

Personal information
- Nationality: South Korean
- Born: 28 December 1990 (age 35); Jangheung-gun, South Jeolla Province
- Height: 1.99 m (6 ft 6 1/2 in)
- Weight: 95 kg (209 lb)

Volleyball information
- Position: Middle blocker
- Current club: Incheon Korean Air Jumbos
- Number: 1

Career
Years	Teams
2013–2016; 2016–2018; 2018–	Ansan OK Savings Bank; Daejeon Samsung Bluefangs; Incheon Korean Air Jumbos

National team
2018–	South Korea
Honours
Asian Games
Silver medal – second place	2018 Jakarta

- Kim Kyu-min
- Hangul: 김규민
- Hanja: 金奎敏
- RR: Gim Gyumin
- MR: Kim Kyumin

Kim Kyu-min (Korean: 김규민; born 28 December 1990) is a volleyball player from South Korea. He currently plays as a middle blocker for the Incheon Korean Air Jumbos club in V-League.

== Career ==
As a senior at Kyonggi University in 2013, Kim completed in the Summer Universiade and East Asian Games as a member of the collegiate national team.

Kim was drafted in the 1st round of the 2013 V-League Draft, 5th overall, by Ansan OK Savings Bank. In the 2013–14 season, Kim averaged 0.44 blocks per set, ranked 10th in the league. The following season, Kim averaged 0.55 blocks per set (10th in the league) and led his team to its first V-League championship win.

In the 2016–17 season, Kim was traded to the Daejeon Samsung Fire Bluefangs.
