= Man Bahadur Shrestha =

Male volleyball captain of Nepal

Man Bahadur Shrestha (Nepali: मान बहादुर श्रेष्ठ) is a Nepali former volleyball. His most significant international achievement came in 2016 when Nepal won a bronze medal at the Asian Central Zone Volleyball Championship. This was the first international medal for Nepal men's volleyball team in 42 years. Shrestha was also honored with the title of "Best Outside Hitter" during the competition.

== Early life ==
Man Bahadur Shrestha faced a challenging childhood as father abandoned his mother. He began volleyball journey in 2008 under the guidance of Nirajan Mahato.

== Volleyball career ==
Shrestha's early success in school-level volleyball competitions earned him recognition, and he was selected for the Western Regional Team, where he trained under Japanese coach Shigeru Nemoto. By 2011, he had joined Nepal's national team and debuted internationally in the 2015 Asian Central Zone Volleyball Championship in Bangladesh. He was appointed national captain in 2080 BS (2023–2024)

=== Career in Nepal Police and Nepal Army Club ===
In 2015, Shrestha was appointed as a member of Nepal Police team.

In 2017, Shrestha permanently joined Nepal Army and captained the volleyball team of Nepal Army Club, leading the team to victory in three major national competitions: the National Championship, the Chief of Army Staff Cup, and the Nepal Volleyball Cup. His leadership and consistent performance earned him several awards, including the "Best Spiker" and "Best Player" titles in various tournaments.

== Personal life ==
Shrestha is married to Lisa Thapa, a fellow volleyball player. They have a daughter.

== Retirement ==
In 2024, he announced retirement from the national team and aim to pursue career as a referee.

== Awards ==
- People's Choice, Pulsar Sports Awards
- Player of the year (2017) by Nepal Volleyball Association (NVA)
