= Pakistan men's national volleyball team =

Pakistani volleyball team

Pakistan
- Nickname(s): The Green Shirts
- Association: Pakistan Volleyball Federation (PVF)
- Confederation: AVC
- Head coach: Rahman Mohammadirad
- FIVB ranking: 39 ▼1 (1 October 2026)

Uniforms
Home	Away

Asian Championship
- Appearances: 14 (First in 1987)
- Best result: 4th (1989)
- pakistanvolleyball.pk
Honours
Asian Games
Bronze medal – third place	1962 Jakarta	Team
Bronze medal – third place	2026 Aichi–Nagoya	Team
AVC Cup
Silver medal – second place	2024 Isa Town	Team
Silver medal – second place	2025 Manama	Team
CAVA Championship
Gold medal – first place	2022 Lahore	Team
Gold medal – first place	2024 Islamabad	Team
Gold medal – first place	2026 Islamabad	Team
Bronze medal – third place	2025 Fergana	Team
South Asian Games
Gold medal – first place	1993 Dhaka	Team
Gold medal – first place	1989 Islamabad	Team
Silver medal – second place	1987 Calcutta	Team
Silver medal – second place	1991 Colombo	Team
Silver medal – second place	1995 Madras	Team
Silver medal – second place	1999 Kathmandu	Team
Silver medal – second place	2004 Islamabad	Team
Silver medal – second place	2010 Dhaka	Team
Silver medal – second place	2019 Kathmandu	Team
Bronze medal – third place	2006 Colombo	Team
Bronze medal – third place	2016 Guwahati	Team

The Pakistan men's national volleyball team represents Pakistan in international volleyball competitions.

Pakistan Volleyball Federation was founded on 31 January 1955. Thereafter, volleyball was taken up at the national level. The Federation received recognition and was affiliated to the Pakistan Olympic Association and the International Volleyball Federation the same year. Pakistan had the honour of winning a bronze medal during the 1962 Asian Games at Jakarta where the matches were played outdoor.

== History ==
Volleyball enjoys huge popularity in small towns and villages across Pakistan. in past.

The national volleyball team has achieved satisfactory results on the Asian scene. Pakistan had the honour of winning a bronze medal during the 1962 Asian Games at Jakarta where the matches were played outdoor.

In the 1989 Asian Men's Volleyball Championship in Seoul, South Korea, Pakistan surprised finishing fourth in a highly competitive field. It won golds at the 1989 and 1993 South Asian Games and won the silver at the 2019 South Asian Games in their latest participation in the tournament after falling against India.

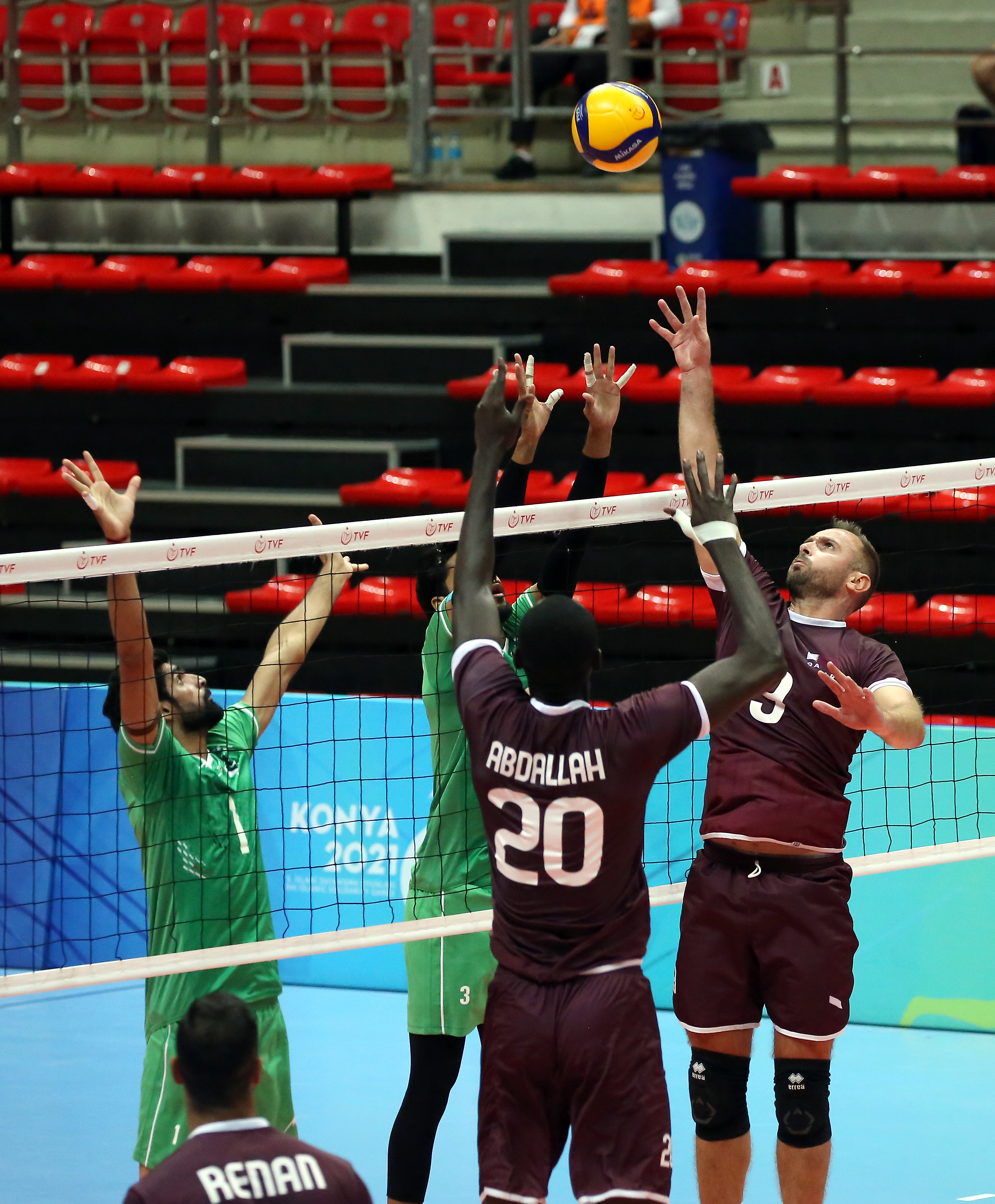
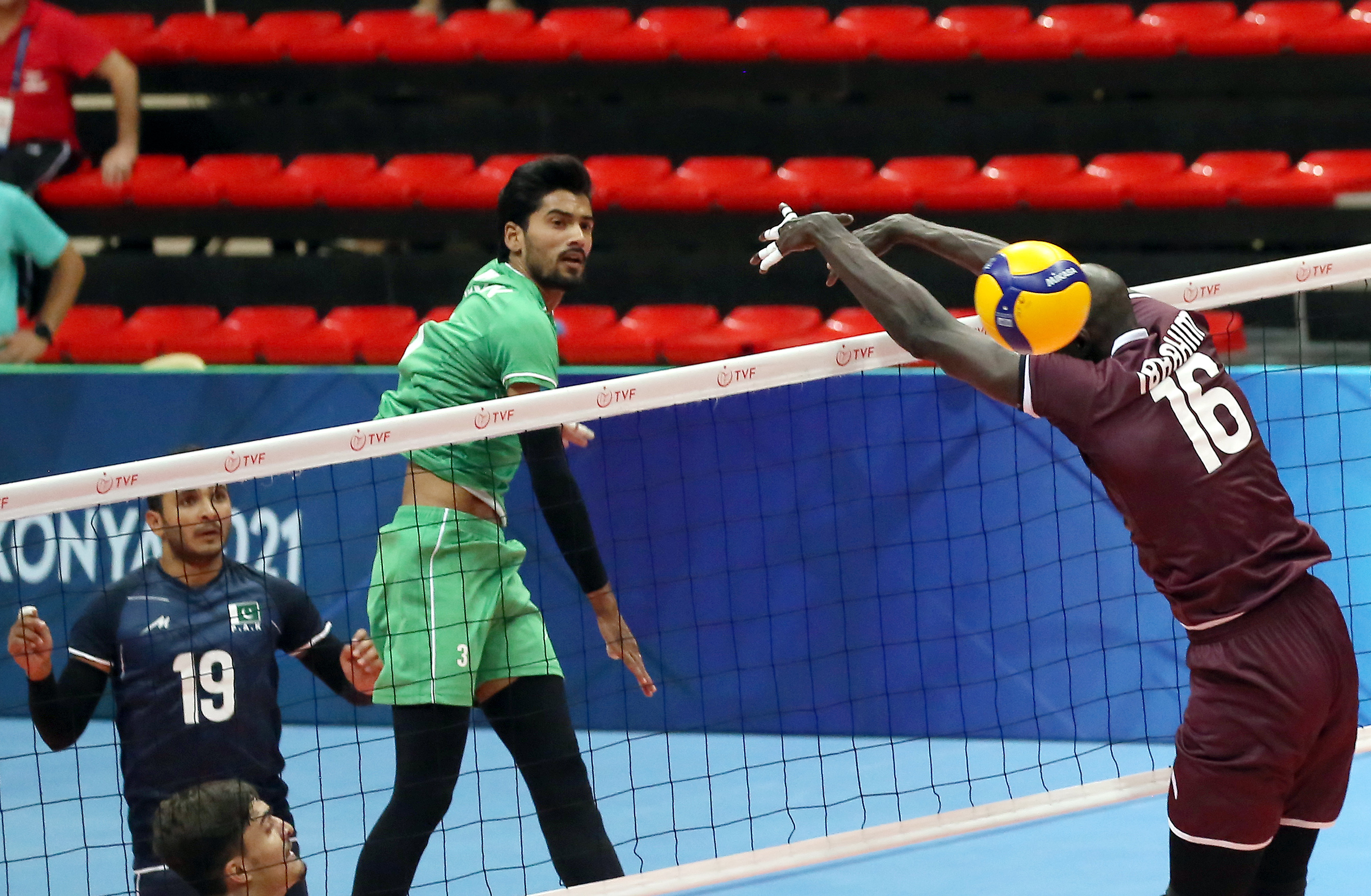
Pakistan at the 2021 Islamic Solidarity Games against Qatar

The national team achieved gold at the 2022 Central Asian Men's Volleyball Championship, after defeating Iran in the final.

In 2024, the team achieved silver at the 2024 AVC Men's Challenge Cup after falling against Qatar.

== Competition record ==
=== Asian Championship ===
- (Australia) 1975 – Did not participate
- (Bahrain) 1979 – Did not participate
- (Japan) 1983 – Did not participate
- (Kuwait) 1987 – 7th place
- (South Korea) 1989 – 4th place
- (Australia) 1991 – 8th place
- (Thailand) 1993 – 8th place
- (South Korea) 1995 – 8th place
- (Qatar) 1997 – 7th place
- (Iran) 1999 – 8th place
- (South Korea) 2001 – Did not participate
- (China) 2003 – 7th place
- (Thailand) 2005 – 9th place
- (Indonesia) 2007 – 13th place
- (Philippines) 2009 – Did not participate
- (Iran) 2011 – 7th place
- (United Arab Emirates) 2013 – Did not participate
- (Iran) 2015 – 10th place
- (Indonesia) 2017 – 12th place
- (Iran) 2019 – 7th place
- (Japan) 2021 – 7th place
- (Iran) 2023 – 7th place
- (Japan) 2026 – Did not qualify

=== Asian Games ===
- (Indonesia) 1962 – 3rd place
- (Thailand) 1966 – 9th place
- (Thailand) 1970 – 8th place
- (Iran) 1974 – 7th place
- (Thailand) 1978 – 9th place
- (South Korea) 1986 – 8th place
- (China) 1990 – 5th place
- (Japan) 1994 – 6th place
- (Thailand) 1998 – 9th place
- (South Korea) 2002 – 7th place
- (China) 2010 – 10th place
- (South Korea) 2014 – 11th place
- (Indonesia) 2018 – 8th place
- (China) 2022 – 5th place
- (Japan) 2026 – 3rd place

=== AVC Cup ===
Champions Runners up Third place Fourth place

AVC Cup record
Year	Round	Position	GP	MW	ML	SW	SL	Squad
(Sri Lanka) 2018	Did not participate							
(Kyrgyzstan) 2022	Did not participate							
(Taiwan) 2023	Qualified but withdrew							
(Bahrain) 2024	Final	2nd	5	4	1	12	6	Squad
(Bahrain) 2025	Final	2nd	5	4	1	13	7	Squad
(India) 2026	Qualified but withdrew							
Total	0 Titles	2/6	10	8	2	25	13	—

=== Asian Cup ===
- 2008 to 2018 – Did not enter or qualify
- (Thailand) 2022 – 6th place

=== CAVA Championship ===
Champions Runners up Third place Fourth place

CAVA Championship record
Year	Round	Position	GP	MW	ML	SW	SL	Squad
(Pakistan) 2022	Final	1st	5	5	0	15	2	Squad
(Kyrgyzstan) 2023	Did not enter							
(Pakistan) 2024	Final	1st	6	6	0	18	3	Squad
(Uzbekistan) 2025	Semifinals	3rd	5	3	2	8	10	Squad
(Pakistan) 2026	Final	1st	7	7	0	21	0	Squad
Total	3 Titles	4/5	23	21	2	62	15	—

=== South Asian Games ===
- (Bangladesh) 1993 – (gold) Runners-up
- (Pakistan) 1989 – (gold) Champions
- (India) 1987 – (silver) Runners-up
- (Sri Lanka) 1991 – (silver) Runners-up
- (India) 1995 – (silver) Runners-up
- (Nepal) 1999 – (silver) Runners-up
- (Pakistan) 2004 – (silver) Runners-up
- (Bangladesh) 2010 – (silver) Runners-up
- (Sri Lanka) 2006 – (bronze) Third place
- (India) 2016 – (bronze) Third place
- (Nepal) 2019 – (silver) Runners-up

== Results and fixtures ==
=== 2025 ===
==== 2025 CAVA Nations League ====
30 May 2025; 13:00 (UTC+05:00)	Pakistan	3–0	Kyrgyzstan	Samo Sport Complex, Fergana, Uzbekistan
30 May 2025; 13:00 (UTC+05:00)	(25–15, 25–14, 25–18); Report			Samo Sport Complex, Fergana, Uzbekistan

31 May 2025; 16:00 (UTC+05:00)	Pakistan	1–3	Kazakhstan	Samo Sport Complex, Fergana, Uzbekistan
31 May 2025; 16:00 (UTC+05:00)	(29–31, 25–27, 25–19, 20–25); Report			Samo Sport Complex, Fergana, Uzbekistan

2 June 2025; 19:00 (UTC+05:00)	India	3–0	Pakistan	Samo Sport Complex, Fergana, Uzbekistan
2 June 2025; 19:00 (UTC+05:00)	(25–15, 25–19, 25–23); Report			Samo Sport Complex, Fergana, Uzbekistan

3 June 2025; 16:00 (UTC+05:00)	Iran	3–1	Pakistan	Samo Sport Complex, Fergana, Uzbekistan
3 June 2025; 16:00 (UTC+05:00)	(28–26, 21–25, 25–17, 25–22); Report			Samo Sport Complex, Fergana, Uzbekistan

4 June 2025; 14:30 (UTC+05:00)	Kazakhstan	1–3	Pakistan	Samo Sport Complex, Fergana, Uzbekistan
4 June 2025; 14:30 (UTC+05:00)	(19–25, 25–23, 16–25, 22–25); Report			Samo Sport Complex, Fergana, Uzbekistan

==== 2025 Asian Nations Cup ====
17 June 2025; 14:00 (UTC+03:00)	Pakistan	3–1	Philippines	Isa Bin Rashed Hall, Manama, Bahrain
17 June 2025; 14:00 (UTC+03:00)	(25–18, 25–12, 21–25, 25–22); Report			Isa Bin Rashed Hall, Manama, Bahrain

19 June 2025; 14:00 (UTC+03:00)	Pakistan	3–2	Chinese Taipei	Isa Bin Rashed Hall, Manama, Bahrain
19 June 2025; 14:00 (UTC+03:00)	(25–20, 25–22, 21–25, 16–25, 18–16); Report			Isa Bin Rashed Hall, Manama, Bahrain

21 June 2025; 14:00 (UTC+03:00)	Indonesia	1–3	Pakistan	Isa Bin Rashed Hall, Manama, Bahrain
21 June 2025; 14:00 (UTC+03:00)	(25–20, 21–25, 20–25, 17–25); Report			Isa Bin Rashed Hall, Manama, Bahrain

23 June 2025; 16:30 (UTC+03:00)	Pakistan	3–0	Qatar	Isa Bin Rashed Hall, Manama, Bahrain
23 June 2025; 16:30 (UTC+03:00)	(25–22, 25–22, 25–21); Report			Isa Bin Rashed Hall, Manama, Bahrain

24 June 2025; 19:00 (UTC+03:00)	Bahrain	3–1	Pakistan	Isa Bin Rashed Hall, Manama, Bahrain
24 June 2025; 19:00 (UTC+03:00)	(23–25, 25–16, 25–17, 25–18); Report			Isa Bin Rashed Hall, Manama, Bahrain

== Team ==
=== Current squad ===
The following is the Pakistani roster in the 2025 Asian Nations Cup.

Head coach: Rahman Mohammadirad

No.	Name	Date of birth	Pos.	Height	Weight	Spike	Block	2024–25 club
1	Salman Khan	7 August 2004	OH	1.95 m (6 ft 5 in)	88 kg (194 lb)	336 cm (132 in)	326 cm (128 in)	(Pakistan) Navy
7	Usman Faryad Ali	22 May 1999	OH	1.89 m (6 ft 2 in)	73 kg (161 lb)	345 cm (136 in)	340 cm (130 in)	(Pakistan) Wapda
10	Fahad Raza	7 March 1997	OP	1.97 m (6 ft 6 in)	93 kg (205 lb)	335 cm (132 in)	325 cm (128 in)	(Pakistan) PAF
11	Murad Khan	2 March 2000	OP	2.05 m (6 ft 9 in)	100 kg (220 lb)	350 cm (140 in)	339 cm (133 in)	(Pakistan) Wapda
13	Muhammad Kashif Naveed	1 January 1994	S	1.89 m (6 ft 2 in)	79 kg (174 lb)	325 cm (128 in)	315 cm (124 in)	(Pakistan) Wapda
14	Abdul Zaheer	25 February 1996	MB	2.05 m (6 ft 9 in)	90 kg (200 lb)	340 cm (130 in)	332 cm (131 in)	(Pakistan) Army
15	Murad Jehan (c)	22 April 1994	OH	1.96 m (6 ft 5 in)	91 kg (201 lb)	338 cm (133 in)	327 cm (129 in)	(Pakistan) Wapda
16	Afaq Khan	26 March 2000	OH	1.95 m (6 ft 5 in)	83 kg (183 lb)	345 cm (136 in)	335 cm (132 in)	(Pakistan) PAF
17	Hamid Yazman	20 March 1998	S	1.93 m (6 ft 4 in)	84 kg (185 lb)	333 cm (131 in)	325 cm (128 in)	(Pakistan) Army
18	Musawer Khan	15 January 2005	MB	1.95 m (6 ft 5 in)	84 kg (185 lb)	340 cm (130 in)	330 cm (130 in)	(Pakistan) Wapda
19	Nasir Ali	6 July 1994	L	1.75 m (5 ft 9 in)	75 kg (165 lb)	290 cm (110 in)	280 cm (110 in)	(Pakistan) Wapda
21	Muhammad Yaseen	2 February 1999	L	1.79 m (5 ft 10 in)	79 kg (174 lb)	285 cm (112 in)	277 cm (109 in)	(Pakistan) Army
24	Ahmed Nazir	11 May 1998	MB	1.96 m (6 ft 5 in)	89 kg (196 lb)	340 cm (130 in)	330 cm (130 in)	(Pakistan) Army

=== Coach history ===
- (Iran) Hamid Mohavedi (2017–2019)
- (South Korea) Kim Kyoung-hoon (2019)
- (Iran) Rahman Mohammadirad (2021, 2025)
- (Brazil) Cristiano Rodrigues Campos (2022)
- (Brazil) Issanaye Ramires Ferraz (2023)
- (Argentina) Ruben Wolochin (2024)
