= Qatar men's national volleyball team =

National sports team

Qatar
- Association: Qatar Volleyball Association (QVA)
- Confederation: AVC
- Head coach: Camilo Soto
- FIVB ranking: 44 (15 October 2026)

Uniforms
Home	Away

World Championship
- Appearances: 3 (First in 2022)
- Best result: 21st (2022)

Asian Championship
- Appearances: 17 (First in 1989)
- Best result: (2023)
- www.volleyball.qa
Honours
Challenger Cup
Silver medal – second place	2023 Doha	Team
Asian Championship
Bronze medal – third place	2023 Urmia	Team
AVC Cup
Gold medal – first place	2024 Isa Town	Team
Bronze medal – third place	2025 Manama	Team
Asian Cup
Gold medal – first place	2018 Taipei	Team
Arab Championship
Silver medal – second place	2014 Kuwait	Team
Silver medal – second place	2024 Bahrain	Team
Bronze medal – third place	1996 Egypt	Team
Bronze medal – third place	2000 Jordan	Team
Bronze medal – third place	2008 Bahrain	Team
WAVA Championship
Gold medal – first place	2025 Manama	Team
Silver medal – second place	2026 Muscat	Team

The Qatar men's national volleyball team represents Qatar in international volleyball competitions and friendly matches. As of 8 January 2025, the team was ranked 21st in the world. Qatar's best rank in Asian Championship 3rd place, 2023 year.

== History ==
Qatar first appeared at the Asian Volleyball Championship in 1989. Qatar also finished fourth at the 2006 Asian Games which they hosted in Doha, after dropping their semifinal 3-1 to South Korea and the bronze medal match 3-2 to Saudi Arabia. Qatar jointly set the world record for the highest set score in its 45-43 victory over Venezuela on 11 June 2017. Qatar made his first world champions appearance at the 2022 FIVB Men's Volleyball World Championship where he finished 21st. Will host the 2029 World Championship.

== Competition record ==
=== World Championship ===
World Championship record									Qualification record				
Year	Round	Position	GP	MW	ML	SW	SL	Squad	GP	MW	ML	SW	SL
(Czechoslovakia) 1949	Did not participate or Did not qualify								Did not participate or Did not qualify				
(Soviet Union) 1952	Did not participate or Did not qualify								Did not participate or Did not qualify				
(France) 1956	Did not participate or Did not qualify								Did not participate or Did not qualify				
(Brazil) 1960	Did not participate or Did not qualify								Did not participate or Did not qualify				
(Soviet Union) 1962	Did not participate or Did not qualify								Did not participate or Did not qualify				
(Czechoslovakia) 1966	Did not participate or Did not qualify								Did not participate or Did not qualify				
(Bulgaria) 1970	Did not participate or Did not qualify								Did not participate or Did not qualify				
(Mexico) 1974	Did not participate or Did not qualify								Did not participate or Did not qualify				
(Italy) 1978	Did not participate or Did not qualify								Did not participate or Did not qualify				
(Argentina) 1982	Did not participate or Did not qualify								Did not participate or Did not qualify				
(France) 1986	Did not participate or Did not qualify								Did not participate or Did not qualify				
(Brazil) 1990	Did not participate or Did not qualify								Did not participate or Did not qualify				
(Greece) 1994	Did not participate or Did not qualify								Did not participate or Did not qualify				
(Japan) 1998	Did not participate or Did not qualify								Did not participate or Did not qualify				
(Argentina) 2002	Did not participate or Did not qualify								3	0	3	2	9
(Japan) 2006	Did not participate or Did not qualify								7	5	2	15	10
(Italy) 2010	Did not participate or Did not qualify								5	3	2	11	7
(Poland) 2014	Did not participate or Did not qualify								7	4	3	14	10
(Italy) (Bulgaria) 2018	Did not participate or Did not qualify								4	2	2	6	8
(Poland) (Slovenia) 2022	Preliminary round	21st	3	0	3	1	9	Squad	2021 Asian Championship				
(Philippines) 2025	Preliminary round	22nd	3	1	2	4	7	Squad	2023 Asian Championship				
(Poland) 2027	Did not qualify												
(Qatar) 2029	Qualified as host												
Total	2/21		6	1	5	5	16	—	26	14	12	48	44

=== World League ===
World League record (Defunct)
Year	Round	Position	GP	MW	ML	SW	SL	Squad
(Japan) 1990	Did not participate							
(Italy) 1991	Did not participate							
(Italy) 1992	Did not participate							
(Brazil) 1993	Did not participate							
(Italy) 1994	Did not participate							
(Brazil) 1995	Did not participate							
(Netherlands) 1996	Did not participate							
(Russia) 1997	Did not participate							
(Italy) 1998	Did not participate							
(Argentina) 1999	Did not participate							
(Netherlands) 2000	Did not participate							
(Poland) 2001	Did not participate							
(Brazil) 2002	Did not participate							
(Spain) 2003	Did not participate							
(Italy) 2004	Did not participate							
(Serbia and Montenegro) 2005	Did not participate							
(Russia) 2006	Did not participate							
(Poland) 2007	Did not participate							
(Brazil) 2008	Did not participate							
(Serbia) 2009	Did not participate							
(Argentina) 2010	Did not qualify							
(Poland) 2011	Did not qualify							
(Bulgaria) 2012	Did not qualify							
(Argentina) 2013	Did not qualify							
(Italy) 2014	Did not qualify							
(Brazil) 2015	Did not qualify							
(Poland) 2016	Intercontinental round	31st	6	3	3	11	10	Squad
(Brazil) 2017	Intercontinental round	32nd	6	3	3	10	10	Squad
Total	2/28		12	6	6	21	20	–

=== Challenger Cup ===
Runners up

Challenger Cup record (Defunct)
Year	Round	Position	GP	MW	ML	SW	SL	Squad
(Portugal) 2018	Did not qualify							
(Slovenia) 2019	Did not enter							
(South Korea) 2022	Quarterfinals	7th	1	0	1	1	3	Squad
(Qatar) 2023	Final	2nd	3	2	1	8	3	Squad
(China) 2024	Quarterfinals	6th	1	0	1	2	3	Squad
Total	0 Title	3/5	5	2	3	11	9	—

=== AVC Continental Championship ===
Champions Runners-up 3rd place 4th place

AVC Continental Championship record
Year	Round	Position	GP	MW	ML	SW	SL	Squad
(Australia) 1975	Did not participate							
(Bahrain) 1979	Did not participate							
(Japan) 1983	Did not participate							
(Kuwait) 1987	Did not participate							
(South Korea) 1989	17th–19th places	19th						Squad
(Australia) 1991	Did not participate							
(Thailand) 1993	11th place match	12th						Squad
(South Korea) 1995		10th						Squad
(Qatar) 1997	5th–8th places	8th						Squad
(Iran) 1999	13th–14th places	13th	5	1	4	5	12	Squad
(South Korea) 2001	11th place match	11th	5	2	3	9	9	Squad
(China) 2003	9th–12th places	11th	7	3	4	11	15	Squad
(Thailand) 2005	7th place match	7th	7	3	4	11	13	Squad
(Indonesia) 2007	9th–12th places	11th	6	3	3	13	9	Squad
(Philippines) 2009	13th place match	14th	8	2	6	10	19	Squad
(Iran) 2011	11th place match	12th	7	2	5	11	15	Squad
(United Arab Emirates) 2013	11th place match	11th	6	3	3	10	13	Squad
(Iran) 2015	Semifinals	4th	8	5	3	20	14	Squad
(Indonesia) 2017	9th place match	9th	7	4	3	18	13	Squad
(Iran) 2019	9th place match	9th	7	4	3	15	10	Squad
(Japan) 2021	5th place match	5th	7	5	2	17	6	Squad
(Iran) 2023	Semifinals	3rd	6	5	1	16	3	Squad
(Japan) 2026	Preliminary round	11th	3	0	3	0	9	Squad
Total	0 Title	18/23	89	42	47	166	160	—

=== Asian Games ===
Champions Runners-up 3rd place 4th place

Asian Games record
Year	Round	Position	GP	MW	ML	SW	SL	Squad
(Japan) 1958	Did not participate							
(Indonesia) 1962	Did not participate							
(Thailand) 1966	Did not participate							
(Thailand) 1970	Did not participate							
(Iran) 1974	Did not participate							
(Thailand) 1978	Did not participate							
(India) 1982	5th–8th places	8th	6	2	4	6	14	Squad
(South Korea) 1986	Did not participate							
(China) 1990	Did not participate							
(Japan) 1994	Did not participate							
(Thailand) 1998	9th place match	10th	5	0	5	0	15	Squad
(South Korea) 2002	7th place match	8th	6	1	5	3	16	Squad
(Qatar) 2006	Semifinals	4th	3	1	2	6	6	Squad
(China) 2010	7th place match	8th	9	3	6	10	20	Squad
(South Korea) 2014	5th place match	6th	8	4	4	15	12	Squad
(Indonesia) 2018	Semifinals	4th	7	5	2	16	8	Squad
(China) 2022	Semifinals	4th	6	4	2	13	10	Squad
(Japan) 2026	To be determined							
Total	0 Title	8/17	50	20	30	69	101	—

=== AVC Cup ===
Champions 3rd place

AVC Cup record
Year	Round	Position	GP	MW	ML	SW	SL	Squad
(Sri Lanka) 2018	Did not participate							
(Kyrgyzstan) 2022	Did not participate							
(Taiwan) 2023	Did not participate							
(Bahrain) 2024	Final	1st	5	4	1	14	4	Squad
(Bahrain) 2025	Semifinals	3rd	4	3	1	9	5	Squad
(India) 2026	7th place match	7th	5	2	3	11	10	Squad
Total	1 Title	3/6	14	9	5	34	19	—

=== Asian Cup ===
Champions

Asian Cup record (Defunct)
Year	Round	Position	GP	MW	ML	SW	SL	Squad
(Thailand) 2008	Did not qualify							
(Iran) 2010	Did not qualify							
(Vietnam) 2012	Did not qualify							
(Kazakhstan) 2014	Did not qualify							
(Thailand) 2016	Qualified but later withdrew							
(Taiwan) 2018	Final	1st	5	5	0	15	3	Squad
(Thailand) 2022	Qualified but later withdrew							
Total	1 Title	1/7	5	5	0	15	3	—

=== Arab Championship ===
- (Egypt) 1996 – (bronze) 3rd place
- (Jordan) 2000 – (bronze) 3rd place
- (Bahrain) 2006 – 5th place
- (Bahrain) 2008 – (bronze) 3rd place
- (Kuwait) 2014 – (silver) Runners-up
- (Bahrain) 2024 – (silver) Runners-up

=== WAVA Championship ===
Champions Runners up Third place Fourth place

WAVA Championship record
Year	Round	Position	GP	MW	ML	SW	SL	Squad
(Bahrain) 2025	Final	1st	6	6	0	18	5	Squad
(Oman) 2026	Final	2nd	4	3	1	9	4	Squad
Total	1 Title	2/2	10	9	1	27	9	—

== Results and fixtures ==
=== 2025 ===
==== 2025 Asian Nations Cup ====
19 June 2025; 11:30 (UTC+03:00)	Qatar	3–0	Australia	Isa Bin Rashed Hall, Manama, Bahrain
19 June 2025; 11:30 (UTC+03:00)	(25–22, 25–21, 25–22); Report			Isa Bin Rashed Hall, Manama, Bahrain

21 June 2025; 16:30 (UTC+03:00)	Qatar	3–2	Vietnam	Isa Bin Rashed Hall, Manama, Bahrain
21 June 2025; 16:30 (UTC+03:00)	(29–31, 25–21, 25–15, 22–25, 15–12); Report			Isa Bin Rashed Hall, Manama, Bahrain

23 June 2025; 16:30 (UTC+03:00)	Pakistan	3–0	Qatar	Isa Bin Rashed Hall, Manama, Bahrain
23 June 2025; 16:30 (UTC+03:00)	(25–22, 25–22, 25–21); Report			Isa Bin Rashed Hall, Manama, Bahrain

24 June 2025; 15:00 (UTC+03:00)	South Korea	0–3	Qatar	Isa Bin Rashed Hall, Manama, Bahrain
24 June 2025; 15:00 (UTC+03:00)	(21–25, 20–25, 23–25); Report			Isa Bin Rashed Hall, Manama, Bahrain

==== 2025 West Asian Championship ====
19 July 2025; 17:00 (UTC+03:00)	Saudi Arabia	0–3	Qatar	Isa Bin Rashed Hall, Manama, Bahrain
19 July 2025; 17:00 (UTC+03:00)	(18–25, 19–25, 14–25); Report			Isa Bin Rashed Hall, Manama, Bahrain

20 July 2025; 17:00 (UTC+03:00)	Oman	1–3	Qatar	Isa Bin Rashed Hall, Manama, Bahrain
20 July 2025; 17:00 (UTC+03:00)	(19–25, 16–25, 25–23, 16–25); Report			Isa Bin Rashed Hall, Manama, Bahrain

21 July 2025; 17:00 (UTC+03:00)	Qatar	3–2	Kuwait	Isa Bin Rashed Hall, Manama, Bahrain
21 July 2025; 17:00 (UTC+03:00)	(25–12, 23–25, 25–17, 22–25, 15–11); Report			Isa Bin Rashed Hall, Manama, Bahrain

23 July 2025; 17:00 (UTC+03:00)	Lebanon	0–3	Qatar	Isa Bin Rashed Hall, Manama, Bahrain
23 July 2025; 17:00 (UTC+03:00)	(17–25, 16–25, 13–25); Report			Isa Bin Rashed Hall, Manama, Bahrain

25 July 2025; 17:00 (UTC+03:00)	Oman	0–3	Qatar	Isa Bin Rashed Hall, Manama, Bahrain
25 July 2025; 17:00 (UTC+03:00)	(18–25, 19–25, 20–25); Report			Isa Bin Rashed Hall, Manama, Bahrain

26 July 2025; 19:00 (UTC+03:00)	Bahrain	2–3	Qatar	Isa Bin Rashed Hall, Manama, Bahrain
26 July 2025; 19:00 (UTC+03:00)	(18–25, 18–25, 25–19, 25–21, 13–15); Report			Isa Bin Rashed Hall, Manama, Bahrain

==== 2025 World Championship ====
13 September 2025; 18:00 (UTC+08:00)	Netherlands	3–1	Qatar	Araneta Coliseum, Quezon City, Philippines; Attendance: 2,974; Referees: Borroto Iglesias Ricardo (CUB), Prater Michelle (USA)
13 September 2025; 18:00 (UTC+08:00)	(25–18, 25–23, 26–28, 25–23); Report			Araneta Coliseum, Quezon City, Philippines; Attendance: 2,974; Referees: Borroto Iglesias Ricardo (CUB), Prater Michelle (USA)

15 September 2025; 21:30 (UTC+08:00)	Poland	3–0	Qatar	Araneta Coliseum, Quezon City, Philippines; Attendance: 1,208; Referees: Luo Wensheng (CHN), ElWafi Haifa (TUN)
15 September 2025; 21:30 (UTC+08:00)	(252–21, 25–14, 25–19); Report			Araneta Coliseum, Quezon City, Philippines; Attendance: 1,208; Referees: Luo Wensheng (CHN), ElWafi Haifa (TUN)

17 September 2025; 10:30 (UTC+08:00)	Qatar	3–1	Romania	Araneta Coliseum, Quezon City, Philippines; Attendance: 312; Referees: Luo Wensheng (CHN), Prater Michelle (USA)
17 September 2025; 10:30 (UTC+08:00)	(20–25, 25–23, 25–20, 25–22); Report			Araneta Coliseum, Quezon City, Philippines; Attendance: 312; Referees: Luo Wensheng (CHN), Prater Michelle (USA)

== Team ==
=== Current squad ===
The following is the Qatari roster in the 2025 World Championship.

Head coach: Camilo Soto

No.	Name	Date of birth	Pos.	Height	Weight	Spike	Block	2024–25 club
1	Youssef Oughlaf	6 May 1989	OH	2.03 m (6 ft 8 in)	100 kg (220 lb)	341 cm (134 in)	327 cm (129 in)	Qatar SC
2	Papemaguette Diagne	23 February 1997	MB	2.10 m (6 ft 11 in)	90 kg (200 lb)	335 cm (132 in)	310 cm (120 in)	(Qatar) Al Rayyan
3	Moubarak Alkuwari	7 November 2003	OH	1.90 m (6 ft 3 in)	67 kg (148 lb)	300 cm (120 in)	290 cm (110 in)	(Qatar) Al-Khor SC
4	Renan Ribeiro	30 December 1989	OH	1.93 m (6 ft 4 in)	85 kg (187 lb)	325 cm (128 in)	300 cm (120 in)	(Qatar) Al Arabi
5	Sulaiman Saad	30 June 1987	L	1.78 m (5 ft 10 in)	72 kg (159 lb)	270 cm (110 in)	255 cm (100 in)	(Qatar) Al Rayyan
6	Borislav Georgiev	12 May 1992	S	1.98 m (6 ft 6 in)	75 kg (165 lb)	340 cm (130 in)	315 cm (124 in)	(Qatar) Al Arabi
7	Belal Nabel Abunabot	1 January 1991	MB	2.00 m (6 ft 7 in)	95 kg (209 lb)	355 cm (140 in)	330 cm (130 in)	(Qatar) Al Rayyan
8	Waleed Widatalla	9 September 2002	OH	1.95 m (6 ft 5 in)	75 kg (165 lb)	320 cm (130 in)	310 cm (120 in)	(Qatar) Al Sadd
11	Nikola Vasić	4 June 1989	OH	1.90 m (6 ft 3 in)	85 kg (187 lb)	340 cm (130 in)	320 cm (130 in)	(Qatar) Al-Wakrah
16	Ibrahim Ibrahim (c)	15 January 1985	MB	2.06 m (6 ft 9 in)	100 kg (220 lb)	360 cm (140 in)	336 cm (132 in)	(Qatar) Al Arabi
19	Naji Mahmoud	16 December 1992	L	1.79 m (5 ft 10 in)	75 kg (165 lb)	265 cm (104 in)	250 cm (98 in)	(Qatar) Al Rayyan
20	Abdallah Ibrahim Nassim	20 January 2001	MB	2.10 m (6 ft 11 in)	100 kg (220 lb)	355 cm (140 in)	340 cm (130 in)	Qatar SC
22	Abdelrahman Bakry	6 November 2004	OP	2.05 m (6 ft 9 in)	115 kg (254 lb)	340 cm (130 in)	325 cm (128 in)	(Qatar) Al Sadd
24	Mahdi Badreddin Sammoud	22 March 1991	S	1.91 m (6 ft 3 in)	80 kg (180 lb)	330 cm (130 in)	310 cm (120 in)	(Qatar) Police SC

=== Coach history ===
- (Croatia) Igor Arbutina (2007–2010)
- (Croatia) Igor Arbutina (2012–2014)
- (Italy) Roberto Piazza (2016–2017)
- (Italy) Massimiliano Giaccardi (2017)
- (Argentina) Camilo Soto (2018–)
