= Nepal men's national volleyball team =

National volleyball team

Nepal
- Association: Nepal Volleyball Association
- Confederation: AVC
- Head coach: (Nepal) Birendra Prasad Chaudhary
- FIVB ranking: NR (5 October 2025)

Uniforms
Home	Away

The Nepal men's national volleyball team represents Nepal in international men's volleyball competitions and friendly matches. It is governed by the Nepal Volleyball Association. Its first international appearance occurred in 1976. The team played 8 games in Pakistan but did not win any. Further development occurred in 1977 when the team went to China and Russia to play and receive coaching. This led to the team's inclusion in the 1978 Asia Games. The team was placed in a group with the UAE, Japan Kuwait and Bangladesh but did not win any games.

The development of future players will be aided by the 2026 inauguration of a men's pro league in Nepal. There will be 6 teams in the League. The Nepal Volleyball Association (NVA) organized the league along with the private marketing company The Kedia Group, which is one of the largest conglomerates in Nepal. The Kedia Group was already involved in sports by its sponsorship of the Tribhuwan Army Football Club.

== Competition history ==
=== Asian Games ===
Asian Games record
Year	Position
(Thailand) 1978	15th
(India) 1982	12th
(South Korea) 1986	12th
(Indonesia) 2018	15th
(China) 2022	18th

=== CAVA Nations League ===
CAVA Nations League record
Year	Position
(Kyrgyzstan) 2023	7th

=== CAVA Challenge Cup ===
CAVA Challenge Cup record
Year	Position
(Sri Lanka) 2023	5th

=== AVC Central Asia Zone Championship ===
AVC Central Asia Zone Championship record
Year	Position
(Bangladesh) 2015	4th
(Bangladesh) 2016	4th
(Maldives) 2017	3rd place, bronze medalist(s)
(Bangladesh) 2018	4th
(Nepal) 2019	5th

=== South Asian Games ===
South Asian Games record
Year	Position
(Nepal) 1999	
(Sri Lanka) 2006	
(Bangladesh) 2010	4th
(India) 2016	5th
(Nepal) 2019	6th
(Pakistan) 2024	TBD

== Current roster ==
Roster for the 2019 South Asian Games.

Nepal national volleyball team
Players	Domestic team	Coaches
Em Bahadur Ranamagar	Nepal Police Club	Head coach: Birendra Chaudhary
Hari Adhikari	Nepal Army Club	Assistant coach: Prajwal Singh
Kul Bahadur Thapa	Nepal Police Club	Manager: Shyam Krishna Shrestha
Hari Hajur Thapa	Nepal Army Club	
Bishal Bahadur B.K.	Nepal Police Club	
Dwarika Thapa	Nepal Police Club	
Rabin Chand	Nepal Police Club	
Dhan Bahadur Bhatta	Nepal Army Club	
Tek Raj Awasthi	Armed Police Force	
Binod Bahadur Chand	Armed Police Force	
Saran Saamri	Nepal Army Club	
Rajendra Bista	Nepal Army Club	
Ishwor Thapa	Nepal Army Club	
Durga Bahadur Khadka	Nepal Army Club	
