= Volleyball in India =

- Country: India
- Governing body: Volleyball Federation of India
- National teams: Men; Women

Volleyball is a sport played all over India, both in rural as well as urban India. It is a popular recreation sport. India was ranked 5th in Asia, and 27th in the world in 2013. Doing well in the youth and junior levels, in second in the 2003 World Youth Championships. Currently, a major problem for the sport is the lack of sponsors. The Indian senior men's team is currently ranked 54th in the world.

== Domestic leagues ==
- Indian Volley League (2011)
- Pro Volleyball League (2019)
- Prime Volleyball League (2022–present)

=== List of National Sports award recipients in Volleyball, showing the year, award, and gender ===
Year	Recipient	Award	Gender
1961	A. Palanisamy	Arjuna Award	Male
1962	Nripjit Singh Bedi	Arjuna Award	Male
1972	Balwant Singh	Arjuna Award	Male
1973	G. Mulilini Reddy	Arjuna Award	Female
1974	M. Syamsunder Rao	Arjuna Award	Male
1975	K. C. Elamma	Arjuna Award	Female
1975	Ranvir Singh	Arjuna Award	Male
1976	Jimmy George	Arjuna Award	Male
1977–1978	A. Ramana Rao	Arjuna Award	Male
1978–1979	Kutty Krishnan	Arjuna Award	Male
1979–1980	Suresh Kumar Mishra	Arjuna Award	Male
1982	G. E. Sridharan	Arjuna Award	Male
1983	R. K. Purohit	Arjuna Award	Female
1984	Saly Joseph	Arjuna Award	Female
1986	Cyril C. Valloor	Arjuna Award	Male
1989	Abdul Basith	Arjuna Award	Male
1990	Dalel Singh Ror	Arjuna Award	Male
1991	K. Udayakumar	Arjuna Award	Male
1999	Sukhpal Singh	Arjuna Award	Male
2000	P. V. Ramana ^{+}	Arjuna Award	Male
2001	Amir Singh	Arjuna Award	Male
2002	Ravikant Reddy	Arjuna Award	Male
2010	K. J. Kapil Dev	Arjuna Award	Male
2011	Sanjay Kumar	Arjuna Award	Male
2014	Tom Joseph	Arjuna Award	Male
2003	Om Prakash	Dhyan Chand Award	Male
2015	T. P. Padmanabhan Nair	Dhyan Chand Award	Male
1990	A. Ramana Rao	Dronacharya Award	Male
1995	Shyam Sunder Rao	Dronacharya Award	Male
2007	G. E. Sridharan	Dronacharya Award	Male

Key
+ Indicates a Lifetime contribution honour

== See also ==
- India men's national volleyball team
- India women's national volleyball team
- Volleyball Federation of India
- Volleyball at the Asian Games
