= List of National Sports Award recipients in Olympic sports =

National Sports Awards in Olympic sports
- Various civilian awards for contributions to Sports (Individual/Team)
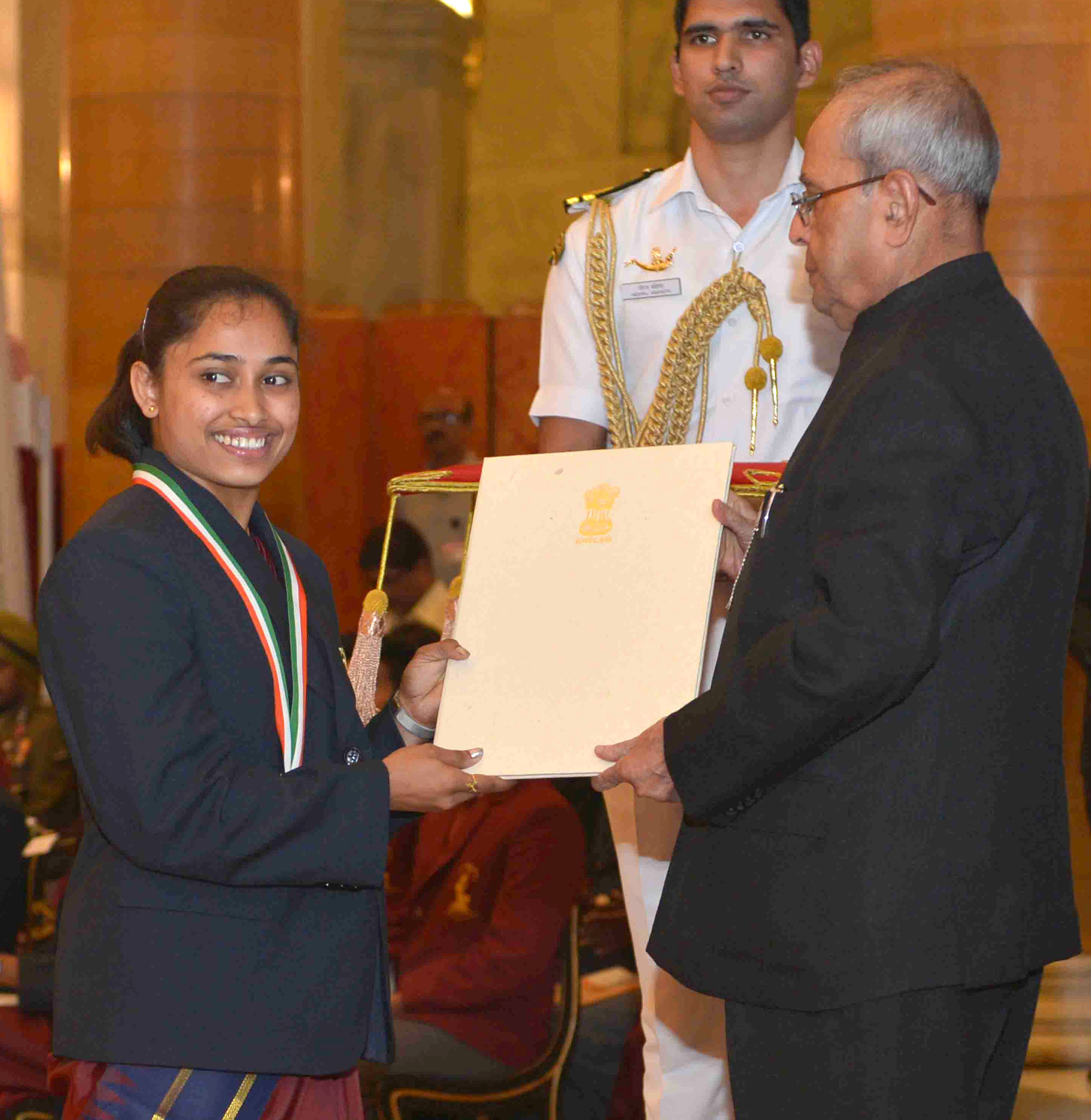
- Awarded for: Various sports honour of India
- Sponsored by: Government of India
- Location: Rashtrapati Bhavan
- Country: Republic of India
- Presented by: President of India
- First award: 1961
- Final award: 2024

Highlights
- Total awarded: 909
- Awards: Arjuna Award; Dronacharya Award; Major Dhyan Chand Khel Ratna Award; Dhyan Chand Award

The National Sports Awards is the collective name given to the six sports awards of Republic of India. It is awarded annually by the Ministry of Youth Affairs and Sports. They are presented by the President of India in the same ceremony at the Rashtrapati Bhavan usually on 29 August each year along with the national adventure award. As of 2020, a total of eight hundred and twenty-seven individuals have been awarded the various National Sports Awards in Olympic sports. The four awards presented in Olympic sports are Major Dhyan Chand Khel Ratna Award, Arjuna Award, Dhyan Chand Award and Dronacharya Award.

First presented in the year 1961, a total of six hundred and twenty-nine individuals have been honoured with the Arjuna Award in Olympic sports for their "good performance at the international level" over the period of last four years, with twenty individuals being awarded for their lifetime contribution. First presented in the year 1985, a total of hundred coaches have been honoured with the Dronacharya Award in Olympic sports for their "outstanding work on a consistent basis and enabling sportspersons to excel in international events" over the period of last four years, with thirty coaches being awarded in the lifetime contribution category. First presented in the year 1994–1995, a total of thirty-one sportspersons have been honoured with the Rajiv Gandhi Khel Ratna, the highest sporting honour of India, in Olympic sports for their "most outstanding performance at the international level" over the period of last four years. First presented in the year 2002, a total of sixty-seven retired sportspersons have been honoured with the Dhyan Chand Award, the lifetime achievement sporting honour of India, in Olympic sports for their "good performance at the international level and their continued contributions to the promotion of sports even after their career as a sportsperson is over." Five awardees have been honoured posthumously including Sachin Nag, who was awarded Dhyan Chand Award posthumously in the year 2020 in the discipline of swimming.

== Recipients ==
=== Archery ===
Key
+ Indicates a Lifetime contribution honour

List of National Sports award recipients, showing the year, award, and gender
Year	Recipient	Award	Gender
1981	Krishna Das	Arjuna Award	Female
1989	Shyam Lal Meena	Arjuna Award	Male
1991	Limba Ram	Arjuna Award	Male
1992	Sanjeeva Kumar Singh	Arjuna Award	Male
2005	Dola Banerjee	Arjuna Award	Female
2005	Tarundeep Rai	Arjuna Award	Male
2006	Jayanta Talukdar	Arjuna Award	Male
2009	Mangal Singh Champia	Arjuna Award	Male
2011	Rahul Banerjee	Arjuna Award	Male
2012	Deepika Kumari	Arjuna Award	Female
2012	Bombayla Devi Laishram	Arjuna Award	Female
2013	Chekrovolu Swuro	Arjuna Award	Female
2014	Abhishek Verma	Arjuna Award	Male
2015	Sandeep Kumar	Arjuna Award	Male
2016	Rajat Chauhan	Arjuna Award	Male
2017	Jyothi Surekha	Arjuna Award	Female
2020	Atanu Das	Arjuna Award	Male
2023	Ojas Deotale	Arjuna Award	Male
2023	Aditi Swami	Arjuna Award	Female
2018	Satyadev Prasad	Dhyan Chand Award	Male
2019	C. Lalremsanga	Dhyan Chand Award	Male
2020	Dharmendra Tiwary ^{+}	Dronacharya Award	Male
2007	Sanjeeva Kumar Singh	Dronacharya Award	Male
2013	Purnima Mahato	Dronacharya Award	Female
2022	Jiwanjot Singh Teja	Dronacharya Award	Male

=== Aquatics ===
Key
+ Indicates a Lifetime contribution honour	# Indicates a posthumous honour

List of National Sports award recipients, showing the year, award, and gender
Year	Recipient	Award	Gender
1961	Bajarangi Prasad	Arjuna Award	Male
1966	Rima Dutta	Arjuna Award	Female
1967	Arun Shaw	Arjuna Award	Male
1969	Baidyanath Nath	Arjuna Award	Male
1971	Bhanwar Singh	Arjuna Award	Male
1973	Dhanvir Khatau	Arjuna Award	Male
1974	Manjari Bhargava	Arjuna Award	Female
1974	Avinash B. Sarang	Arjuna Award	Male
1975	Smita Desai	Arjuna Award	Female
1975	M. S. Rana	Arjuna Award	Male
1982	Persis Madan	Arjuna Award	Female
1983	Anita Sood	Arjuna Award	Male
1984	Khajan Singh	Arjuna Award	Male
1988	Wilson Cherian	Arjuna Award	Male
1990	Bula Choudhury	Arjuna Award	Female
1996	V. Kutraleeswaran	Arjuna Award	Male
1998	Bhanu Sachdeva	Arjuna Award	Male
1999	Nisha Millet	Arjuna Award	Female
2000	J. Abhijith	Arjuna Award	Male
2000	Sebastian Xavier	Arjuna Award	Male
2005	Shikha Tandon	Arjuna Award	Female
2010	Rehan Poncha	Arjuna Award	Male
2011	Virdhawal Khade	Arjuna Award	Male
2012	Sandeep Sejwal	Arjuna Award	Male
2024	Sajan Prakash	Arjuna Award	Male
2011	Sushil Kohli	Dhyan Chand Award	Male
2014	K. P. Thakkar	Dhyan Chand Award	Male
2020	Sachin Nag^{#}	Dhyan Chand Award	Male
2015	Nihar Ameen ^{+}	Dronacharya Award	Male
2016	S. Pradeep Kumar ^{+}	Dronacharya Award	Male
2021	Tapan Kumar Panigrahi ^{+}	Dronacharya Award	Male

=== Basketball ===
Key
+ Indicates a Lifetime contribution honour

List of National Sports award recipients, showing the year, award, and gender
Year	Recipient	Award	Gender
1961	Sarbjit Singh	Arjuna Award	Male
1967	Khushi Ram	Arjuna Award	Male
1968	Gurdial Singh	Arjuna Award	Male
1969	Hari Dutt	Arjuna Award	Male
1970	Gulam Abbas Moontasir	Arjuna Award	Male
1971	M. M. Singh	Arjuna Award	Male
1973	Surendra Kumar Kataria	Arjuna Award	Male
1974	Anil Kumar Punj	Arjuna Award	Male
1975	Hanuman Singh	Arjuna Award	Male
1977–1978	T. Vijayaraghava	Arjuna Award	Male
1979–1980	Om Prakash	Arjuna Award	Male
1982	Ajmer Singh	Arjuna Award	Male
1983	Suman Sharma	Arjuna Award	Female
1983	Radhey Shyam	Arjuna Award	Male
1999	Sajjan Singh Cheema ^{+}	Arjuna Award	Male
2001	Parmender Singh	Arjuna Award	Male
2014	Geethu Anna Jose	Arjuna Award	Female
2017	Prashanti Singh	Arjuna Award	Female
2020	Vishesh Bhriguvanshi	Arjuna Award	Male
2002	Aparna Ghosh	Dhyan Chand Award	Female
2003	Ram Kumar	Dhyan Chand Award	Male

=== Cycling ===
List of National Sports award recipients, showing the year, award, and gender
Year	Recipient	Award	Gender
1975	Amar Singh	Arjuna Award	Male
1978–1979	Minati Mahapatra	Arjuna Award	Female
1983	Armin R. Arthan	Arjuna Award	Female

=== Equestrian ===
List of National Sports award recipients, showing the year, award, and gender
Year	Recipient	Award	Gender
1973	Dafadar Md. Khan	Arjuna Award	Male
1976	H. S. Sodhi	Arjuna Award	Male
1982	R. S. Brar	Arjuna Award	Male
1982	Raghubir Singh	Arjuna Award	Male
1984	Ghulam Mohammed Khan	Arjuna Award	Male
1987	J. S. Ahluwalia	Arjuna Award	Male
1991	Adhiraj Singh	Arjuna Award	Male
2003	Rajesh Pattu	Arjuna Award	Male
2004	Deep Kumar Ahlawat	Arjuna Award	Male
2019	Fouaad Mirza	Arjuna Award	Male
2020	Sawant Ajay Anant	Arjuna Award	Male
2023	Anush Agarwalla	Arjuna Award	Male
2023	Divyakriti Singh	Arjuna Award	Female

=== Fencing ===
List of National Sports award recipients, showing the year, award, and gender
Year	Recipient	Award	Gender
2021	C. A. Bhavani Devi	Arjuna Award	Female

=== Football ===
List of National Sports award recipients, showing the year, award, and gender
Year	Recipient	Award	Gender
2021	Sunil Chhetri	Major Dhyan Chand Khel Ratna	Male
1961	P. K. Banerjee	Arjuna Award	Male
1962	Tulsidas Balaram	Arjuna Award	Male
1963	Chuni Goswami	Arjuna Award	Male
1964	Jarnail Singh	Arjuna Award	Male
1965	Arun Ghosh	Arjuna Award	Male
1966	Yousuf Khan	Arjuna Award	Male
1967	Peter Thangaraj	Arjuna Award	Male
1969	Inder Singh	Arjuna Award	Male
1970	Syed Nayeemuddin	Arjuna Award	Male
1971	C. P. Singh	Arjuna Award	Male
1973	Magan Singh Rajvi	Arjuna Award	Male
1978–1979	Gurdev Singh Gill	Arjuna Award	Male
1979–1980	Prasun Banerjee	Arjuna Award	Male
1980–1981	Mohammed Habib	Arjuna Award	Male
1981	Sudhir Karmakar	Arjuna Award	Male
1983	Shanti Mullick	Arjuna Award	Female
1989	Subrata Bhattacharya	Arjuna Award	Male
1997	Brahmanand Sankhwalkar	Arjuna Award	Male
1998	Bhaichung Bhutia	Arjuna Award	Male
2001	Bruno Coutinho	Arjuna Award	Male
2002	I. M. Vijayan	Arjuna Award	Male
2010	Deepak Mondal	Arjuna Award	Male
2011	Sunil Chhetri	Arjuna Award	Male
2016	Subrata Pal	Arjuna Award	Male
2017	Oinam Bembem Devi	Arjuna Award	Female
2019	Gurpreet Singh Sandhu	Arjuna Award	Male
2020	Sandesh Jhingan	Arjuna Award	Male
2011	Shabbir Ali	Dhyan Chand Award	Male
2017	Syed Shahid Hakim	Dhyan Chand Award	Male
2020	Sukhvinder Singh Sandhu	Dhyan Chand Award	Male
1990	Syed Nayeemuddin	Dronacharya Award	Male
2022	Bimal Prafulla Ghosh	Dronacharya Award	Male
2024	Armando Colaco ^{+}	Dronacharya Award	Male

=== Golf ===
List of National Sports award recipients, showing the year, award, and gender
Year	Recipient	Award	Gender
1961	P. G. Sethi	Arjuna Award	Male
1963	Ashok Malik	Arjuna Award	Male
1967	Raj Kumar Pitambar	Arjuna Award	Male
1972	Anjani N. Desai	Arjuna Award	Female
1973	Vikramjit Singh	Arjuna Award	Male
1975	S. K. Jamshed	Arjuna Award	Male
1977–1978	Sita Rawlley	Arjuna Award	Female
1982	Lakshman Singh	Arjuna Award	Male
1987	Nonita Lal	Arjuna Award	Female
1991	Ali Sher	Arjuna Award	Male
1996	Amit Luthra	Arjuna Award	Male
1997	Harmik Kahlon	Arjuna Award	Male
1999	Jeev Milkha Singh	Arjuna Award	Male
2002	Shiv Kapur	Arjuna Award	Male
2004	Jyoti Randhawa	Arjuna Award	Male
2007	Arjun Atwal	Arjuna Award	Male
2013	Gaganjeet Bhullar	Arjuna Award	Male
2014	Anirban Lahiri	Arjuna Award	Male
2017	Shiv Chawrasia	Arjuna Award	Male
2018	Shubhankar Sharma	Arjuna Award	Male
2020	Aditi Ashok	Arjuna Award	Female
2023	Diksha Dagar	Arjuna Award	Female
2024	Jaskirat Singh Grewal ^{+}	Dronacharya Award	Male

=== Gymnastics ===
Key
+ Indicates a Lifetime contribution honour

List of National Sports award recipients, showing the year, award, and gender
Year	Recipient	Award	Gender
2016	Dipa Karmakar	Rajiv Gandhi Khel Ratna	Female
1961	Sham Lal	Arjuna Award	Male
1975	Mantu Debnath	Arjuna Award	Male
1985	Sunita Sharma	Arjuna Award	Female
1989	Krupali Patel	Arjuna Award	Female
2000	Kalpana Debnath ^{+}	Arjuna Award	Female
2011	Ashish Kumar	Arjuna Award	Male
2015	Dipa Karmakar	Arjuna Award	Female
2011	Devender Kumar Rathore	Dronacharya Award	Male
2016	Bishweshwar Nandi	Dronacharya Award	Male

=== Judo ===
Key
+ Indicates a Lifetime contribution honour

List of National Sports award recipients, showing the year, award, and gender
Year	Recipient	Award	Gender
1992	Sandeep Byala	Arjuna Award	Male
1993	Cawas Billimoria	Arjuna Award	Male
1996	Poonam Chopra	Arjuna Award	Female
1998	Narender Singh	Arjuna Award	Male
2003	Akram Shah	Arjuna Award	Male
2004	Angom Anita Chanu	Arjuna Award	Female
2007	Tombi Devi	Arjuna Award	Female
2012	Yashpal Solanki	Arjuna Award	Male
2022	Shushila Devi Likmabam	Arjuna Award	Female
2014	Gurcharan Gogi ^{+}	Dronacharya Award	Male
2018	Jiwan Kumar Sharma ^{+}	Dronacharya Award	Male

=== Lawn Tennis ===
Key
+ Indicates a Lifetime contribution honour

List of National Sports award recipients, showing the year, award, and gender
Year	Recipient	Award	Gender
1996–1997	Leander Paes	Rajiv Gandhi Khel Ratna	Male
2015	Sania Mirza	Rajiv Gandhi Khel Ratna	Female
1961	Ramanathan Krishnan	Arjuna Award	Male
1962	Naresh Kumar	Arjuna Award	Male
1966	Jaidip Mukerjea	Arjuna Award	Male
1967	Premjit Lall	Arjuna Award	Male
1974	Vijay Amritraj	Arjuna Award	Male
1978–1979	Nirupama Mankad	Arjuna Award	Female
1980–1981	Ramesh Krishnan	Arjuna Award	Male
1985	Anand Amritraj	Arjuna Award	Male
1990	Leander Paes	Arjuna Award	Male
1995	Mahesh Bhupathi	Arjuna Award	Male
1996	Gaurav Natekar	Arjuna Award	Male
1997	Asif Ismail	Arjuna Award	Male
2000	Akhtar Ali ^{+}	Arjuna Award	Male
2001	Sandeep Kirtane	Arjuna Award	Male
2004	Sania Mirza	Arjuna Award	Female
2011	Somdev Devvarman	Arjuna Award	Male
2017	Saketh Myneni	Arjuna Award	Male
2018	Rohan Bopanna	Arjuna Award	Male
2020	Divij Sharan	Arjuna Award	Male
2021	Ankita Raina	Arjuna Award	Female
2014	Zeeshan Ali	Dhyan Chand Award	Male
2015	Shiv Prakash Mishra	Dhyan Chand Award	Male
2019	Nitin Kirtane	Dhyan Chand Award	Male
2020	Nandan P. Bal	Dhyan Chand Award	Male
2020	Naresh Kumar ^{+}	Dronacharya Award	Male

=== Rowing ===
Key
+ Indicates a Lifetime contribution honour

List of National Sports award recipients, showing the year, award, and gender
Year	Recipient	Award	Gender
1983	Parvin K. Uberoy	Arjuna Award	Male
1984	Mohd. Amin Naik	Arjuna Award	Male
1991	Dalvir Singh	Arjuna Award	Male
1994	R. S. Bhanwala	Arjuna Award	Male
1996	Surender Singh Waldia	Arjuna Award	Male
1999	Jagjit Singh	Arjuna Award	Male
2000	Surender Singh Kanwasi ^{+}	Arjuna Award	Male
2001	Kasam Khan	Arjuna Award	Male
2002	Inderpal Singh	Arjuna Award	Male
2004	Jenil Krishnan	Arjuna Award	Male
2007	Bajrang Lal Takhar	Arjuna Award	Male
2009	Satish Joshi	Arjuna Award	Male
2014	Saji Thomas	Arjuna Award	Male
2015	Sawarn Singh	Arjuna Award	Male
2020	Dattu Baban Bhokanal	Arjuna Award	Male
2025	Arvind Singh	Arjuna Award	Male
2003	Smita Shirole Yadav	Dhyan Chand Award	Female
2016	Rajendra Pralhad Shelke	Dhyan Chand Award	Male
2020	Manjeet Singh	Dhyan Chand Award	Male
2014	Jose Jacob ^{+}	Dronacharya Award	Male
2005	Ismail Baig	Dronacharya Award	Male

=== Squash ===
List of National Sports award recipients, showing the year, award, and gender
Year	Recipient	Award	Gender
1961	K. S. Jain	Arjuna Award	Male
1969	Anil Nayar	Arjuna Award	Male
1979–1980	Rajkumar Manchanda	Arjuna Award	Male
1982	Bhuvneshwari Kumari	Arjuna Award	Female
1990	M. R. Dharuvala	Arjuna Award	Male
1997	Misha Grewal	Arjuna Award	Female
2006	Saurav Ghosal	Arjuna Award	Male
2012	Dipika Pallikal	Arjuna Award	Female
2013	Joshna Chinappa	Arjuna Award	Female
2014	Anaka Alankamony	Arjuna Award	Female
2023	Harinder Pal Sandhu	Arjuna Award	Male
2024	Abhay Singh	Arjuna Award	Male
2004	Cyrus Poncha	Dronacharya Award	Male

=== Table Tennis ===
Key
+ Indicates a Lifetime contribution honour

List of National Sports award recipients, showing the year, award, and gender
Year	Recipient	Award	Gender
2020	Manika Batra	Rajiv Gandhi Khel Ratna	Female
2022	Sharath Kamal	Major Dhyan Chand Khel Ratna	Male
1961	J. C. Vohra	Arjuna Award	Male
1964	Gautam R. Diwan	Arjuna Award	Male
1966	Usha Sunder Das	Arjuna Award	Female
1967	Faruk R. Khodaiji	Arjuna Award	Male
1969	Mir Khasim Ali	Arjuna Award	Male
1970	Gudalore Jagannath	Arjuna Award	Male
1971	Kaity Farookh Khodaiji	Arjuna Award	Female
1973	Niraj Ramkrishna Bajaj	Arjuna Award	Male
1976	Shailaja Salokhe	Arjuna Award	Female
1979–1980	Indu Puri	Arjuna Award	Female
1980–1981	Manjit Dua	Arjuna Award	Male
1982	Venugopal Chandrasekhar	Arjuna Award	Male
1985	Kamlesh Mehta	Arjuna Award	Male
1987	Monalisa Baruah Mehta	Arjuna Award	Female
1989	Niyati Shah	Arjuna Award	Female
1990	M. S. Walia	Arjuna Award	Male
1997	Chetan Baboor	Arjuna Award	Male
1998	Subramaniam Raman	Arjuna Award	Male
2002	Mantu Ghosh	Arjuna Award	Female
2004	Sharath Kamal	Arjuna Award	Male
2005	Soumyadeep Roy	Arjuna Award	Male
2006	Subhajit Saha	Arjuna Award	Male
2009	Poulomi Ghatak	Arjuna Award	Female
2013	Mouma Das	Arjuna Award	Female
2016	Soumyajit Ghosh	Arjuna Award	Male
2017	Anthony Amalraj	Arjuna Award	Male
2018	Manika Batra	Arjuna Award	Female
2018	Sathiyan Gnanasekaran	Arjuna Award	Male
2019	Harmeet Desai	Arjuna Award	Male
2020	Madhurika Patkar	Arjuna Award	Female
2022	Sreeja Akula	Arjuna Award	Female
2023	Ayhika Mukherjee	Arjuna Award	Female
2019	Arup Basak	Dhyan Chand Award	Male
2012	Bhawani Mukherjee ^{+}	Dronacharya Award	Male
2023	Jayanta Kumar Pushilal ^{+}	Dronacharya Award	Male
2018	A. Srinivasa Rao	Dronacharya Award	Male
2019	Sandip Gupta	Dronacharya Award	Male
2021	Subramanian Raman	Dronacharya Award	Male

=== Volleyball ===
Key
+ Indicates a Lifetime contribution honour

List of National Sports award recipients, showing the year, award, and gender
Year	Recipient	Award	Gender
1961	A. Palanisamy	Arjuna Award	Male
1962	Nripjit Singh Bedi	Arjuna Award	Male
1972	Balwant Singh	Arjuna Award	Male
1973	G. Mulilini Reddy	Arjuna Award	Female
1974	M. Syamsunder Rao	Arjuna Award	Male
1975	K. C. Elamma	Arjuna Award	Female
1975	Ranvir Singh	Arjuna Award	Male
1976	Jimmy George	Arjuna Award	Male
1977–1978	A. Ramana Rao	Arjuna Award	Male
1978–1979	Kutty Krishnan	Arjuna Award	Male
1979–1980	Suresh Kumar Mishra	Arjuna Award	Male
1982	G. E. Sridharan	Arjuna Award	Male
1983	R. K. Purohit	Arjuna Award	Female
1984	Saly Joseph	Arjuna Award	Female
1986	Cyril C. Valloor	Arjuna Award	Male
1989	Abdul Basith	Arjuna Award	Male
1990	Dalel Singh Ror	Arjuna Award	Male
1991	K. Udayakumar	Arjuna Award	Male
1999	Sukhpal Singh	Arjuna Award	Male
2000	P. V. Ramana ^{+}	Arjuna Award	Male
2001	Amir Singh	Arjuna Award	Male
2002	Ravikant Reddy	Arjuna Award	Male
2010	K. J. Kapil Dev	Arjuna Award	Male
2011	Sanjay Kumar	Arjuna Award	Male
2014	Tom Joseph	Arjuna Award	Male
2003	Om Prakash	Dhyan Chand Award	Male
2015	T. P. Padmanabhan Nair	Dhyan Chand Award	Male
1990	A. Ramana Rao	Dronacharya Award	Male
1995	Shyam Sunder Rao	Dronacharya Award	Male
2007	G. E. Sridharan	Dronacharya Award	Male

=== Weightlifting ===
List of National Sports award recipients, showing the year, award, and gender
Year	Recipient	Award	Gender
1994–1995	Karnam Malleswari	Rajiv Gandhi Khel Ratna	Female
1995–1996	Nameirakpam Kunjarani	Rajiv Gandhi Khel Ratna	Female
2018	Saikhom Mirabai Chanu	Rajiv Gandhi Khel Ratna	Female
1961	A. N. Ghosh	Arjuna Award	Male
1962	L. K. Dass	Arjuna Award	Male
1963	Kamineni Eswara Rao	Arjuna Award	Male
1965	Balbir Singh Bhatia	Arjuna Award	Male
1966	Mohon Lal Ghosh	Arjuna Award	Male
1967	Savarimuthu John Cabriel	Arjuna Award	Male
1970	Arun Kumar Dass	Arjuna Award	Male
1971	Shyamlal Salwan	Arjuna Award	Male
1972	Anil Mondal	Arjuna Award	Male
1974	S. Vellaiswamy	Arjuna Award	Male
1975	Dalbir Singh	Arjuna Award	Male
1976	K. Balamuruganandam	Arjuna Award	Male
1977–1978	M. T. Selvan	Arjuna Award	Male
1978–1979	Ekambaram Karunakaran	Arjuna Award	Male
1981	Bijay Kumar Satpathy	Arjuna Award	Male
1982	Tara Singh	Arjuna Award	Male
1983	Vispy K. Daroga	Arjuna Award	Male
1985	Mehar Chand Bhaskar	Arjuna Award	Male
1986	Jagmohan Sapra	Arjuna Award	Male
1987	G. Devan	Arjuna Award	Male
1989	Jyotsna Dutta	Arjuna Award	Female
1990	R. Chandra	Arjuna Award	Male
1990	Kunjarani Devi	Arjuna Award	Female
1991	Chhaya Adak	Arjuna Award	Female
1993	Bharati Singh	Arjuna Award	Female
1994	Karnam Malleswari	Arjuna Award	Male
1997	N. Laxmi	Arjuna Award	Female
1997	Paramjit Sharma	Arjuna Award	Male
1998	Satheesha Rai	Arjuna Award	Male
1999	Dalbir Singh	Arjuna Award	Male
2000	Sanamacha Chanu	Arjuna Award	Female
2002	Thandava Murthy Muthu	Arjuna Award	Male
2006	Geeta Rani	Arjuna Award	Female
2011	Katulu Ravi Kumar	Arjuna Award	Male
2012	Ngangbam Soniya Chanu	Arjuna Award	Female
2014	Renu Bala Chanu	Arjuna Award	Female
2015	Sathish Sivalingam	Arjuna Award	Male
2022	Vikas Thakur	Arjuna Award	Male
2010	Anita Chanu	Dhyan Chand Award	Female
1996	Pal Singh Sandhu	Dronacharya Award	Male
1999	Ajay Kumar Sirohi	Dronacharya Award	Male
2000	Hansa Sharma	Dronacharya Award	Female
2018	Vijay Sharma	Dronacharya Award	Male

=== Winter Sports ===
List of National Sports award recipients, showing the year, award, and gender
Year	Recipient	Award	Gender
2020	Shiva Keshavan	Arjuna Award	Male
