= Katariya =

Katariya may refer to:

== Places ==
- Katariya, Ambedkar Nagar district, a census town in Uttar Pradesh, India
- Katariya, Ghazipur district, a village in Uttar Pradesh, India
- Katariya, Kutch, a village in Kutch district, Gujarat, India

== People ==
- Ashok Katariya (born 1972), Indian politician from Uttar Pradesh
- Lavmeet Katariya, Indian volleyball player
- Sharat Katariya (born 1978), Indian film director and screenwriter
- Vandana Katariya (born 1992), Indian field hockey player

== See also ==
- Kataria
- Katara
