= Volleyball Federation of India =

Governing body of volleyball in India

- Sport: Volleyball
- Jurisdiction: India
- Abbreviation: VFI
- Founded: 1951; 75 years ago
- Affiliation: FIVB
- Regional affiliation: AVC
- Headquarters: Chennai, Tamil Nadu, India
- President: Vacant (Under FIVB Steering Committee)
- Secretary: Vacant

Official website
- www.volleyballindia.com
- (India)

The Volleyball Federation of India (VFI) is the governing body of volleyball in India.

== History ==
The Volleyball Federation of India was formed in the year 1951. Prior to the formation of the Volleyball Federation of India (VFI), the game was controlled by the Indian Olympic Association (IOA) and at that time the Interstate Volleyball Championship was held every two years from 1936 to 1950 for men only. The first Championship was held in the year 1936 at Lahore (now in Pakistan). In 1951, the Volleyball Federation of India was formed and its first meeting was held in Ludhiana (Punjab).

== National teams ==
=== Men ===
- India men's national volleyball team
- India men's national under-23 volleyball team
- India men's national under-21 volleyball team
- India men's national under-19 volleyball team
- India men's national under-17 volleyball team

=== Women ===
- India women's national volleyball team
- India women's national under-23 volleyball team
- India women's national under-21 volleyball team
- India women's national under-19 volleyball team
- India women's national under-17 volleyball team

== Tournaments ==
- Asian Games 1986

The Indian team which was coached by late Achutha Kurup and Sethumadhvan and captained by Cyril Valoor won the bronze medal. The following shared the team in 1986 and since then India has not won any medal in Asian Games till date:

- Abdul Basith
- Jimmy George
- K. Udayakumar (Late - died in Heart attack in Trivandrum, Kerala)
- Shaikh Kareemullah Khan
- Mehar Singh
- Kirtesh Kumar Trivedi
- Dalel Singh
- Ramavtar Singh Jakhar
- Sukhpal Singh
- P. V. Ramana
- G. E. Sridharan

== See also ==
- Indian Volley League
- Pro Volleyball League
- Prime Volleyball League
