= India men's national volleyball team =

Men's national volleyball team representing India

India
- Association: Volleyball Federation of India (VFI)
- Confederation: AVC
- Head coach: Dragan Mihailović
- FIVB ranking: 48 ▼3 (15 October 2026)

Uniforms
Home	Away

World Championship
- Appearances: 2 (First in 1952)
- Best result: 8th (1952)

Asian Championship
- Appearances: 19 (First in 1979)
- Best result: 4th (2005)
- volleyballindia.com
Honours
Asian Games
Silver medal – second place	1962 Jakarta	Team
Bronze medal – third place	1958 Tokyo	Team
Bronze medal – third place	1986 Seoul	Team
Asian Cup
Silver medal – second place	2014 Almaty	Team
Bronze medal – third place	2010 Urmia	Team
Asian Nations Cup
Bronze medal – third place	2026 Ahmedabad	Team
CAVA Nations League
Silver medal – second place	2025 Fergana	Team
Lusofonia Games
Gold medal – first place	2014 Goa	Team
Bronze medal – third place	2006 Macau	Team
South Asian Games
Gold medal – first place	1987 Calcutta	Team
Gold medal – first place	1991 Colombo	Team
Gold medal – first place	1995 Madras	Team
Gold medal – first place	1999 Kathmandu	Team
Gold medal – first place	2004 Islamabad	Team
Gold medal – first place	2006 Colombo	Team
Gold medal – first place	2010 Dhaka	Team
Gold medal – first place	2016 Guwahati	Team
Gold medal – first place	2019 Kathmandu	Team
Silver medal – second place	1989 Islamabad	Team
Silver medal – second place	1993 Colombo	Team

The India men's national volleyball team represents India in international volleyball competitions. It is managed by the Volleyball Federation of India and is currently sponsored by Sahara India Pariwar and Asics.

The Indian volleyball team has had a rollercoaster ride in its history. Although they have never qualified for the Olympics, they have appeared in the World Championship twice.

Despite having little to no presence at the world stage in its history, the team has enjoyed some success at the continental level by clinching a silver medal and two bronze medals at the Asian Games. After the decline after the 1980s, the team has fared well at the recently introduced Asian Cup competition, receiving a silver and a bronze medal so far.

== History ==
=== Pre-Independence ===
Though the game was played informally for a long time, the first interstate volleyball tournament was held in 1936 by the Indian Olympic Association (IOA).

=== Establishment ===
In 1951, the formation of Volleyball Federation of India gave the sport a better structure and the interstate tournament evolved into the senior national championship with the first edition being held in 1952. This platform gave birth to many talents who went on to represent India at the international level.

=== Golden years (1952–1962) ===
India had immediate success after formation as they made their debut in FIVB Men's Volleyball World Championship's 1952 edition. After losing to France and Czechoslovakia by comfortable 3–0 margins in the first round, they made a comeback in the 7th–8th placing round as they beat Finland, Lebanon and Israel to clinch the 8th spot.

In 1955, India won the Asian Volleyball Tournament which was held in Tokyo. Three years later, the Gurudev Singh led team won the bronze medal at the 1958 Asian Games. They beat Hong Kong and the Philippines in three straight sets but could not get past volleyball powerhouses Iran and Japan, though they managed to win a set against each.

In the 1962 Asian Games they managed to go one step ahead as they began their campaign with four consecutive wins against Burma(twice), Cambodia and Pakistan. Their old rivals Japan got the better of them in what was a five set thriller, with Japan winning the final set by 15–12 margin. This team was led by legendary players Nripjit Singh Bedi and A. Palaniswamy, both Arjuna Award winners, who had graduated to the senior team, which was then led by TP Padmanabhan Nair, who was also a part of the 1958 team. India has to settle for the Silver Medal which is currently their highest achievement ever at the Asian Games.

=== The finest era (1960s–1980s) ===
After a memorable outing at the 1962 Asian Games, India finished fourth and fifth at the 1966 and 1974 Asian Games respectively, not making it to the 1970 edition in between.

India did not enter into the inaugural Asian men's volleyball championship in 1975 but made their debut in the following tournament in 1979 where they finished fifth. In the 1978 Asian Games in Bangkok and at the 1982 Asian Games at home in New Delhi, the Indian volleyball team saw another upswing after finishing seventh and fourth respectively, falling just short of a medal in 1982 edition after they finished at the bottom of the table among four teams in the final round, going down to the heavyweights South Korea and China in straight sets.

In the following year at the Asian Volleyball Championship in Tokyo, India finished fifth yet again without any medal. However, the wait for a medal would not last long.

At the 1986 Asian Games, India sent a team led by Cyril Valloor that included former national coach GE Sridharan, K Udayakumar, who later captained the Indian volleyball team, Abdul Basith, Dalel Singh and PV Ramana, father of Indian badminton player PV Sindhu.

All of them were Arjuna awardees, including the team's lynchpin Jimmy George. Besides playing on the national circuit for a decade, he also had stints at clubs in Italy, along with GE Sridharan.

Jimmy George towered at a height of 6'2" and had the advantage of graceful jumps. His ability in the air for a fraction of a second longer helped him in his smashes, all of which were very powerful thanks to his larger frame.

All of these factors combined well together and the Indian volleyball team started the Asian Games with four victories – against Hong Kong, Bahrain, Saudi Arabia and Indonesia.

Later in the games, they went down to the home team South Korea, who went on to register another victory later, but in between the Indian volleyball team finally managed to beat powerhouses Japan, more impressively in straight sets, facilitated by Jimmy George's tremendous drive. However, they could not sustain the momentum, as they fell to eventual champions China, to end up with bronze medal.

=== Decline (1990s–2000s) ===
The general popularity of the sport in the country declined in the years to follow as in-fighting within federations coincided with the death of Jimmy George in an accident in 1987 and adding to it was the rise of the Indian national cricket team as a powerhouse.

The Indian volleyball men and women's teams dominated the South Asian Federation Games in the nineties, winning three medals each, but it did not spark a revival, with subpar performances to follow at the 2006 and 2010 by the men after they came at ninth and sixth respectively.

However, they finished fourth in the 2005 Asian Men's Volleyball Championship which is currently their highest ever finish at this tournament. They went all the way to semi-finals where they lost in straight sets against Japan and then went down to South Korea in third place match losing with a margin of three sets to one.

=== 2010–present ===
The 2010 and 2014 editions of the Asian Games provided some respite as the Indian volleyball men's team finished a respectable fifth with modern-day stars and inspirational captains Sinnadu Prabhagaran, Sube singh and Mohan Ukkrapandian leading the way. The team also played at the Asian Cup, where they achieved some fine results, capturing bronze medal at the 2010 Asian Cup and reached all the way to the final of the 2014 Asian Cup by defeating Japan in the group stage, the top Asian team Iran in the semi-final before succumbing to South Korea with a margin of three sets to one. Besides couple of good performances at the Asian level, the team also managed to claim a gold medal at the 2010 South Asian Games.

The Indian volleyball men's team was ranked 34th in 2014, their best in the world, they also managed to win a gold medal eighth gold medal at 2016 South Asian Games, but just as it seemed that the sport was picking up again, an internal dispute in the VFI meant that it was banned from the International Volleyball Federation (FIVB) for two years till 2018.

It meant that Indian volleyball players could not travel to other leagues to play, which affected the exposure to different styles, a factor which coach GE Sridharan felt led to a 12th-place finish at the 2018 Asian Games.

The Pro Volleyball League, a franchise-based tournament was started in 2019 and it featured stars like American David Lee, an Olympic gold medallist in 2008. India also gained their ninth and seventh successive gold medal at the South Asian Games in 2019.

The men's Indian volleyball team did not qualify for the Tokyo Olympics following their loss in the Olympic qualification tournament. The team finished sixth in the 2022 Asian Games in Hangzhou, China. They topped their group, scoring an upset 3–2 victory over favourites South Korea.

== Competitive record ==
=== Summer Olympics ===
India has never qualified for the Summer Olympics.

Summer Olympics record						Qualification record		
Year	Result	Position	Pld	W	L	Pld	W	L
(Japan) 1964	Did not qualify					–		
(Mexico) 1968	Did not qualify					–		
(West Germany) 1972	Did not qualify					–		
(Canada) 1976	Did not enter					Did not enter		
(Soviet Union) 1980	Did not qualify					5th		
(United States) 1984	Did not qualify					5th		
(South Korea) 1988	Did not qualify					5th		
(Spain) 1992	Did not qualify					10th		
(United States) 1996–2008 (China)	Did not qualify					Did not qualify		
(United Kingdom) 2012	Did not qualify					3	0	3
(Brazil) 2016	Did not qualify					Did not qualify		
(Japan) 2020	Did not qualify					3	0	3
(France) 2024	Did not qualify					Did not qualify		
(United States) 2028	To be determined					To be determined		
(Australia) 2032	To be determined					To be determined		
Total	0/17					6	0	6

=== FIVB World Championship ===
India has appeared in the FIVB World Championship only twice. They came really close to qualifying in the 2002 qualifiers, missing a place in the World Championship by one spot as they finished third among three best second-placed finishers.

FIVB World Championship record						Qualification record		
Year	Result	Position	Pld	W	L	Pld	W	L
(Czechoslovakia) 1949	Did not enter					–		
(Soviet Union) 1952	7th–8th placings	8th	6	3	3	–		
(France) 1956	21st–24th placings	21st	5	3	2	–		
(Brazil) 1960	Did not enter					–		
(Soviet Union) 1962	Did not enter					–		
(Czechoslovakia) 1966	Did not enter					Did not enter		
(Bulgaria) 1970	Did not enter					Did not enter		
(Mexico) 1974	Did not enter					Did not enter		
(Italy) 1978	Did not enter					Did not enter		
(Argentina) 1982	Did not qualify					6	5	1
(France) 1986	Did not qualify					7	5	2
(Brazil) 1990	Did not qualify					6th place		
(Greece) 1994	Did not enter					Did not enter		
(Japan) 1998	Did not enter					Did not enter		
(Argentina) 2002	Did not qualify					3	2	1
(Japan) 2006	Did not qualify					5	2	3
(Italy) 2010	Did not qualify					6	3	3
(Poland) 2014	Did not qualify					6	5	1
(Italy) (Bulgaria) 2018	Suspended					Suspended		
(Poland) (Slovenia) 2022	Did not qualify					2021 Asian Championship		
(Philippines) 2025	Did not qualify					2023 Asian Championship		
(Poland) 2027	To be determined					To be determined		
(Qatar) 2029	To be determined					To be determined		
Totals	2/23	8th	11	6	5	20	12	8

=== Asian Games ===
During the initial years, India had an immediate success as they clinched two bronze medals and a silver medal in their first seven Asian Games campaigns.

Following a bronze medal in the 1986 Asian Games, India did not participate in the next two tournaments due to the controversy in the Federation and the death of Jimmy George. Since then, India has seen a decline in its performance and has not won a medal yet.

Asian Games record
Year	Result	Position	Pld	W	L
(Japan) 1958	Group stage	Bronze medal	4	2	2
(Indonesia) 1962	Final round	Silver medal	7	6	1
(Thailand) 1966	Final round	4th	8	5	3
(Thailand) 1970	Did not enter				
(Iran) 1974	Classification 5th–8th	5th	5	3	2
(Thailand) 1978	Classification 7th–12th	7th	5	3	2
(India) 1982	Final round	4th	5	3	2
(South Korea) 1986	Final round	Bronze medal	8	5	3
(China) 1990	Did not enter				
(Japan) 1994	Did not enter				
(Thailand) 1998	Classification 7th–8th	7th	5	3	2
(South Korea) 2002	Classification 5th–6th	5th	6	4	2
(Qatar) 2006	Preliminary round	9th	4	3	1
(China) 2010	Classification 5th–6th	6th	8	5	3
(South Korea) 2014	Classification 5th–6th	5th	8	4	4
(Indonesia) 2018	Classification 11th–12th	12th	6	2	4
(China) 2022	Classification 5th–6th	6th	5	3	2
(Japan) 2026	Classification 5th–6th	6th	6	4	2
Totals	15/18	Runners-up	90	55	35

=== AVC Continental Championship ===
India has appeared in the finals for 18 times out of 21. Their highest ever finish was in 2005, when they ended up in fourth place.

AVC Continental Championship record
Year	Result	Position	Pld	W	L
(Australia) 1975	Did not enter				
(Bahrain) 1979	Classification 5th–8th	5th	6	5	1
(Japan) 1983	Classification 5th–8th	5th	7	5	2
(Kuwait) 1987	Classification 5th–8th	5th	8	5	3
(South Korea) 1989	Classification 5th–8th	6th	8	5	3
(Australia) 1991	Classification 9th–12th	10th	5	2	3
(Thailand) 1993	Classification 9th–12th	9th	5	3	2
(South Korea) 1995	Did not enter				
(Qatar) 1997	Classification 9th–12th	9th	9	6	3
(Iran) 1999	Classification 9th–12th	9th	8	6	2
(South Korea) 2001	Classification 5th–8th	7th	6	2	4
(China) 2003	Classification 5th–8th	5th	9	6	3
(Thailand) 2005	Semi-finals	4th	7	4	3
(Indonesia) 2007	Classification 9th–12th	9th	10	9	1
(Philippines) 2009	Final round	9th	8	6	2
(Iran) 2011	5th–8th semi-finals	6th	6	3	3
(United Arab Emirates) 2013	5th–8th semi-finals	7th	7	3	4
(Iran) 2015	9th–12th semi-finals	11th	6	3	3
(Indonesia) 2017	Suspended				
(Iran) 2019	5th–8th semi-finals	8th	9	2	7
(Japan) 2021	9th–12th semi-finals	9th	7	4	3
(Iran) 2023	Classification 7th–12th	11th	5	2	3
(Japan) 2026	Quarter-finals	8th	4	1	3
Totals	19/22	4th	140	82	58

=== Asian Cup ===
India has done well in the recently introduced Asian Cup competition, qualifying for it three times. Their highest ever finish came in the 2014 edition, where they beat old rivals Japan in the preliminary stage, and Iran in the semi-finals, before losing to South Korea in the final. They had to settle for a silver medal which extended their wait for a gold medal at the Asian level since their formation.

Asian Cup record
Year	Result	Position	Pld	W	L
(Thailand) 2008	Did not qualify				
(Iran) 2010	3rd place match	Bronze medal	6	3	3
(Vietnam) 2012	3rd place match	4th place	6	2	4
(Kazakhstan) 2014	1st place match	Silver medal	6	4	2
(Thailand) 2016	Did not qualify				
(Taiwan) 2018	Did not qualify				
(Thailand) 2022	Classification round	10th place	4	1	3
Totals	4/7	Runners-up	22	10	12

=== AVC Cup ===
The Indian Ad-Hoc Committee did not allow the Indian team to participate in the 2023 tournament. As a result, India still played their matches, but the results of the matches were forfeited, as requested by the committee.

AVC Cup record
Year	Result	Position	Pld	W	L
(Sri Lanka) 2018	Did not participate				
(Kyrgyzstan) 2022	Did not participate				
(Taiwan) 2023	13th–15th places	15th (Note: The Indian Ad-Hoc Committee did not allow their Indian men's team to participate in the tournament. As a result, India still played their matches, but the results of the matches were forfeited, as requested by the committee.)	3	0	3
(Bahrain) 2024	Did not participate				
(Bahrain) 2025	Did not participate				
(India) 2026	3rd place match	Bronze medal	7	6	1
Totals	2/6	Third place	10	6	4

=== CAVA Nations League ===
CAVA Nations League record
Year	Result	Position	Pld	W	L	Ref
(Uzbekistan) 2025	1st place match	Silver	6	4	2	

=== Lusofonia Games ===
India won its first gold medal at the Lusofonia Games in the 2014 edition.

Year	Position
(Macau) 2006	3rd place, bronze medalist(s)
(Portugal) 2009	4th
(India) 2014	1st place, gold medalist(s)

=== South Asian Games ===
India is the most successful team at the South Asian Games, having won nine gold medals and two silver medals.

Year	Position
(India) 1987	1st place, gold medalist(s)
(Pakistan) 1989	2nd place, silver medalist(s)
(Sri Lanka) 1991	1st place, gold medalist(s)
(Bangladesh) 1993	2nd place, silver medalist(s)
(India) 1995	1st place, gold medalist(s)
(Nepal) 1999	1st place, gold medalist(s)
(Pakistan) 2004	1st place, gold medalist(s)
(Sri Lanka) 2006	1st place, gold medalist(s)
(Bangladesh) 2010	1st place, gold medalist(s)
(India) 2016	1st place, gold medalist(s)
(Nepal) 2019	1st place, gold medalist(s)

== Managerial history ==
HP Kohli was considered the best coach the Indian volleyball team ever had. He coached Indian Volleyball team during its golden era of 1950s to 1970s. He died on 13 January 1980 due to cardiac arrest.

Achutha Kurup was considered the master tactician who guided India to its last medal at the Asian Games. He was appointed in 1982 ahead of the 1982 Asian Games in Delhi, but what brought him fame was a bronze medal in 1986 Asian Games four years later. Kurup was also at the helm when the Indian team won the silver in an international tournament in Japan in 1989.

Shyam Sunder Rao was appointed as the coach of Indian volleyball team after his success with the Junior national team. With his eyes set on a medal at the 2002 Asian Games, his side missed an opportunity to end India's medal draught at the Asian Games since 1986, as they missed a place in the semi-finals by one point. However, the team went on to beat Pakistan and Chinese Taipei to finish fifth in the tournament.

Head coach	Period
(India) Achutha Kurup	1986–1994
(India) Shyam Sunder Rao	1995–2002
(India) Shyam Sunder Rao	2008–2011
(India) G.E. Sridharan	2018–2019
(Serbia) Dragan Mihailović	2019–2020
(India) G.E. Sridharan	2020–2023
(India) Jaideep Sarkar	2023–2024
(Serbia) Dragan Mihailović	2024–

== Current coaching staff ==
Role	Name
Head coach	(Serbia) Dragan Mihailović
Assistant coaches	(India) Jewel Sathyanremamani (India) Boby Xavier
Physiotherapist	(India) Abhishek Dwivedi
Physical trainer	(Italy) Matteo Biscaro
Statistician	(India) Ashutosh Mishra

== Results and schedule ==
The following is a list of match results in the last 12 months, as well as any future matches that have been scheduled.

Win Draw Loss Fixture

=== 2026 ===
All times are in IST

Date	Time		Score		Set 1	Set 2	Set 3	Set 4	Set 5	Total	Event	Location	Report
20-06-2026	21:00	India	3–0	New Zealand	25–23	25–19	25–14			75–56	2026 AVC; Cup	(India); Ahmedabad	P2 Boxscore
21-06-2026	21:00	India	3–0	Kazakhstan	25–16	25–21	25–15			75–52	2026 AVC; Cup	(India); Ahmedabad	P2 Boxscore
22-06-2026	21:00	India	3–1	Chinese Taipei	22–25	25–14	25–22	25–22		97–73	2026 AVC; Cup	(India); Ahmedabad	P2 Boxscore
23-06-2026	21:00	India	3–0	Bahrain	22–21	25–16	25–22			75–59	2026 AVC; Cup	(India); Ahmedabad	P2 Boxscore
25-06-2026	21:00	India	3–0	Australia	26–24	25–14	30–28			81–66	2026 AVC; Cup	(India); Ahmedabad	P2 Boxscore
27-06-2026	19:00	India	2–3	Indonesia	24–15	24–26	20–25	25–19	13–15	107–100	2026 AVC; Cup	(India); Ahmedabad	P2 Boxscore
28-06-2026	15:30	Bahrain	1–3	India	23–25	25–23	21–25	17–25		86–98	2026 AVC; Cup	(India); Ahmedabad	P2 Boxscore
05-09-2026	10:00	China	3–0	India	25–21	28–26	27–25			80–72	2026 AVC Continental Championship	(Japan); Kitakyushu	P2 Boxscore
06-09-2026	06:30	Iran	3–0	India	25–20	28–26	25–18			78–64	2026 AVC Continental Championship	(Japan); Kitakyushu	P2 Boxscore
08-09-2026	06:30	India	3–0	New Zealand	25–22	25–22	25–21			75–65	2026 AVC Continental Championship	(Japan); Kitakyushu	P2 Boxscore
11-09-2026	16:00	Japan	3–0	India	25–17	25–15	25–19			75–51	2026 AVC Continental Championship	(Japan); Kitakyushu	P2 Boxscore
27-09-2026	12:30	India	3–0	Vietnam	25–23	25–21	25–20			75–64	2026 Asian Games	(Japan); Aichi-Nagoya	P2 Report
28-09-2026	06:30	India	3–0	Hong Kong	25–22	25–19	25–21			75–62	2026 Asian Games	(Japan); Aichi-Nagoya	P2 Report
29-09-2026	12:30	Qatar	2–3	India	28–26	27–25	23–25	20–25	22–24	120–125	2026 Asian Games	(Japan); Aichi-Nagoya	P2 Report
01-10-2026	06:30	India	0–3	Pakistan	19–25	23–25	18–25			60–75	2026 Asian Games	(Japan); Aichi-Nagoya	P2 Report
02-10-2026	06:30	India	3–1	South Korea	25–16	25–20	23–25	25–23		98–84	2026 Asian Games	(Japan); Aichi-Nagoya	P2 Report
03-10-2026	09:30	Thailand	3–2	India	25–19	17–25	25–21	17–25	17–15	101–105	2026 Asian Games	(Japan); Aichi-Nagoya	P2 Report

== Team ==
=== Current squad ===
The following list consists of 14 players who are called for 2026 AVC Volleyball Cup.

#	Position	Name	Date of birth	State	Height
1	MB	Amrinderpal Singh	1 February 1997 (age 29)	(India) Punjab	200 cm (6 ft 7 in)
5	OH	Joel Benjamin	26 August 2003 (age 23)	(India) Tamil Nadu	191 cm (6 ft 3 in)
6	OH	Erin Varghese	25 April 1998 (age 28)	(India) Kerala	192 cm (6 ft 4 in)
8	OS	Muhammad Nihal C. K.	26 August 2002 (age 24)	(India) Kerala	197 cm (6 ft 6 in)
9	OH	Chirag Yadav	11 November 2000 (age 26)	(India) Haryana	196 cm (6 ft 5 in)
10	L	Anand Kottarathil	11 September 2002 (age 24)	(India) Kerala	175 cm (5 ft 9 in)
12	OS	Jerome Vinith Charles (c)	26 June 1992 (age 34)	(India) Tamil Nadu	198 cm (6 ft 6 in)
14	OM	Om Lad	13 December 2003 (age 22)	(India) Maharashtra	193 cm (6 ft 4 in)
16	S	Muthusamy Appavu	10 July 1997 (age 29)	(India) Tamil Nadu	191 cm (6 ft 3 in)
17	MB	John Joseph E. J.	7 April 2000 (age 26)	(India) Kerala	201 cm (6 ft 7 in)
19	MB	Shikhar Singh	11 September 2000 (age 26)	(India) Chhattisgarh	200 cm (6 ft 7 in)
21	OH	Hemanth Pulparambil	29 July 2000 (age 26)	(India) Kerala	189 cm (6 ft 2 in)
23	MB	Shameemudheen Ammarambath	6 March 1996 (age 30)	(India) Kerala	194 cm (6 ft 4 in)
28	L	Ramanathan Ramamoorthy	10 June 1997 (age 29)	(India) Tamil Nadu	174 cm (5 ft 9 in)

== Notable players and past squads ==
- Riaz Ahmed
- Abdul Basith
- Anup D'Costa
- K. J. Kapil Dev
- Jimmy George
- Tilakam Gopal
- Naveen Raja Jacob
- Tom Joseph
- Suresh Kumar Mishra
- T. P. Padmanabhan Nair
- A. Palanisamy
- R. K. Purohit
- A. Ramana Rao
- Shyam Sunder Rao
- Yejju Subba Rao
- Balwant Singh
- G. E. Sridharan
- K. Udayakumar
- Mohan Ukkrapandian
- Cyril C. Valloor

== See also ==
- India women's national volleyball team
