= Abdul Basith =

Abdul Basith may refer to:

- Abdul Basith (cricketer) (born 1998), Indian cricketer
- Abdul Basith (volleyball) (1959–1991), Indian volleyballer

== See also ==
- Abd al-Basit, an Arabic male given name
