= Volleyball at the 2014 Asian Games – Men's tournament =

Men at the 2014 Asian Games
- Venue: Songnim Gymnasium; Sangnoksu Gymnasium
- Date: 20 September – 3 October 2014
- Competitors: 191 from 16 nations

Medalists
gold medal	Iran
silver medal	Japan
bronze medal	South Korea

The 2014 Men's Asian Games Volleyball Tournament was the 15th edition of the event, organized by the Asian governing body, the AVC. It was held in Incheon (Songnim Gymnasium) and Ansan (Sangnoksu Gymnasium), South Korea from 20 September to 3 October 2014.

== Squads ==
China	Chinese Taipei	Hong Kong	India
Yuan Zhi; Zhang Chen; Liang Chunlong; Zhong Weijun; Cui Jianjun; Geng Xin; Kou Zhichao; Xu Jingtao; Li Runming; Ren Qi; Ji Daoshuai; Mao Tianyi	Chang Liang-hao; Li Chia-hsuan; Huang Chun-ching; Liu Hung-min; Chiang Tien-yu; Lu Chiang Yao-chiang; Cheng Ju-chien; Wang Ming-chun; Huang Chien-feng; Lin Yung-shun; Huang Pei-hung; Chen Chien-chen	Yik Chi Hin; Jacky Kwong; Lam Chun Man; Lee Man Sing; Chung Wai Sze; Siu Cheong Hung; Wu Lok Kan; Jonathan Ng; Kwok Chung Kan; Luk Chun Ho; Yau Tze Ching; Alex Chan	G. R. Vaishnav; Mandeep Singh; Ranjit Singh; Charles Jerome Vinith; Dilip Khoiwal; Navjit Singh; Sinnadhu Prabagaran; Sivasubramanian Kanagaraj; Mohan Ukkrapandian; Gurinder Singh; Naveen Raja Jacob; Lavmeet Katariya
Iran	Japan	Kazakhstan	Kuwait
Shahram Mahmoudi; Milad Ebadipour; Saeid Marouf; Farhad Ghaemi; Mohammad Mousavi; Pouria Fayazi; Farhad Zarif; Adel Gholami; Amir Ghafour; Mojtaba Mirzajanpour; Mehdi Mahdavi; Armin Tashakkori	Kunihiro Shimizu; Shohei Uchiyama; Yu Koshikawa; Ryusuke Tsubakiyama; Masahiro Yanagida; Akihiro Yamauchi; Hideomi Fukatsu; Yuki Ishikawa; Takashi Dekita; Takeshi Nagano; Yuta Yoneyama; Yamato Fushimi	Anton Kuznetsov; Anton Yudin; Alexandr Stolnikov; Sergey Kuznetsov; Kairat Baibekov; Dmitriy Gorbatkov; Kanat Gabdulin; Marat Imangaliyev; Nodirkhan Kadirkhanov; Sergey Radkevich; Vitaliy Vorivodin; Maxim Mamedov	Abdullah Jasem; Mousa Baharoh; Abdulaziz Al-Khareef; Ali Ramadan; Sultan Khalaf; Amer Al-Salim; Mohammad Al-Banna; Naser Dashti; Abdullah Dashti; Zaid Al-Kazimi; Abdulrahman Al-Otaibi; Abdulaziz Shaker
Maldives	Myanmar	Pakistan	Qatar
Mohamed Ahsan; Junaid Abdulla; Hussain Saeed; Ishan Mohamed; Ismail Sajid; Ahmed Abdul Kareem; Hassan Nilam; Ali Huzam; Hussain Visam; Ahmed Nabeel; Ashfag Adam; Mohamed Shain	Nay Lin Aung; Kyaw Kyaw Htwe; Zaw Myo; Myo Min Oo; Win Tun Oo; Khwe Char Maung; Do Mae Ni Ko; Aung Thu; Yan Lin Aung; Thwin Htoo Zin; Nay Lin Aung	Mohib Rasool; Mubashar Raza; Shujah Abbas Naqvi; Asif Nadeem; Akhtar Ali; Muhammad Ismail Khan; Aimal Khan; Nasir Khan; Naseer Ahmed; Imran Sultan; Murad Jehan; Muhammad Idrees	Jumah Faraj; Miloš Stevanović; Renan Ribeiro; Sulaiman Saeed; John Chigbo; Ali Ishaq Bairami; Ndir Ababacar; Ahmad Diab; Mubarak Dahi; Mohammed Abuwatfa; Ibrahim Mohammed; Mohammed Al-Beshri
Saudi Arabia	South Korea	Thailand	Turkmenistan
Majed Al-Jahani; Ahmed Al-Bakhit; Nawaf Al-Bakhit; Omar Al-Najrani; Dhia Al-Khawaher; Ayman Al-Ghamdi; Muwaffaq Al-Mutairi; Ahmed Al-Mabadi; Thamer Al-Dossari; Ismail Al-Khaibari; Ibrahim Majrashi; Abdulaziz Al-Khaldi	Song Myung-geun; Han Sun-soo; Shin Yung-suk; Lee Min-gyu; Park Sang-ha; Kwak Seung-suk; Bu Yong-chan; Choi Min-ho; Jeon Kwang-in; Park Chul-woo; Seo Jae-duck; Jeong Min-su	Jirayu Raksakaew; Montri Vaenpradab; Kon Nanboon; Khanit Sinlapasorn; Kittikun Sriutthawong; Kittinon Namkhunthod; Yossapol Wattana; Wutthichai Suksala; Kitsada Somkane; Teerasak Nakprasong; Saranchit Charoensuk; Montri Puanglib	Gurbanmuhammet Gylyçdurdyýew; Berdimämmet Täçgeldiýew; Bahram Rozmetow; Ýusup Gurbanow; Merdan Azimow; Döwletgeldi Nuryýew; Mekan Massarow; Didar Nuryýew; Dawut Nuryýew; Ruslan Artykow; Begli Myratgeldiýew; Ezizmyrat Gaýypow

== Results ==
All times are Korea Standard Time (UTC+09:00)

=== Preliminary round ===
==== Group A ====
Pos	Team	Pld	W	L	Pts	SW	SL	SR	SPW	SPL	SPR	Qualification
1	South Korea	3	3	0	9	9	0	MAX	225	183	1.230	Play-off / Group E–F
2	Qatar	3	2	1	6	6	3	2.000	213	200	1.065	Play-off / Group E–F
3	Chinese Taipei	3	1	2	2	3	8	0.375	224	254	0.882	Play-off / Group G–H
4	Kazakhstan	3	0	3	1	2	9	0.222	230	255	0.902	Play-off / Group G–H

Source: Results

Date	Time	Venue		Score		Set 1	Set 2	Set 3	Set 4	Set 5	Total	Report
20 Sep	15:00	Incheon	South Korea	3–0	Kazakhstan	25–16	25–21	25–23			75–60	Report
21 Sep	13:00	Ansan	Chinese Taipei	0–3	Qatar	21–25	17–25	21–25			59–75	Report
23 Sep	13:00	Ansan	Kazakhstan	0–3	Qatar	23–25	22–25	21–25			66–75	Report
24 Sep	19:30	Incheon	South Korea	3–0	Chinese Taipei	25–22	25–18	25–20			75–60	Report
26 Sep	15:00	Incheon	Chinese Taipei	3–2	Kazakhstan	25–23	17–25	25–21	23–25	15–10	105–104	Report
27 Sep	17:30	Ansan	South Korea	3–0	Qatar	25–22	25–19	25–22			75–63	Report

==== Group B ====
Pos	Team	Pld	W	L	Pts	SW	SL	SR	SPW	SPL	SPR	Qualification
1	Japan	3	3	0	9	9	1	9.000	247	182	1.357	Play-off / Group E–F
2	Kuwait	3	2	1	6	7	3	2.333	224	224	1.000	Play-off / Group E–F
3	Saudi Arabia	3	1	2	3	3	6	0.500	184	210	0.876	Play-off / Group G–H
4	Pakistan	3	0	3	0	0	9	0.000	186	225	0.827	Play-off / Group G–H

Source: Results

Date	Time	Venue		Score		Set 1	Set 2	Set 3	Set 4	Set 5	Total	Report
20 Sep	12:30	Incheon	Pakistan	0–3	Kuwait	22–25	21–25	16–25			59–75	Report
21 Sep	15:30	Ansan	Japan	3–0	Saudi Arabia	25–15	25–14	25–12			75–41	Report
22 Sep	14:00	Incheon	Kuwait	3–0	Saudi Arabia	27–25	25–23	25–20			77–68	Report
23 Sep	15:30	Ansan	Pakistan	0–3	Japan	23–25	23–25	23–25			69–75	Report
25 Sep	15:00	Incheon	Japan	3–1	Kuwait	25–15	22–25	25–15	25–17		97–72	Report
26 Sep	17:30	Ansan	Saudi Arabia	3–0	Pakistan	25–15	25–20	25–23			75–58	Report

==== Group C ====
Pos	Team	Pld	W	L	Pts	SW	SL	SR	SPW	SPL	SPR	Qualification
1	Iran	3	3	0	9	9	0	MAX	225	157	1.433	Play-off / Group E–F
2	India	3	2	1	6	6	4	1.500	235	201	1.169	Play-off / Group E–F
3	Hong Kong	3	1	2	3	4	6	0.667	200	232	0.862	Play-off / Group G–H
4	Maldives	3	0	3	0	0	9	0.000	155	225	0.689	Play-off / Group G–H

Source: Results

Date	Time	Venue		Score		Set 1	Set 2	Set 3	Set 4	Set 5	Total	Report
20 Sep	16:30	Ansan	India	3–1	Hong Kong	23–25	25–18	25–16	25–21		98–80	Report
22 Sep	16:00	Incheon	Maldives	0–3	Hong Kong	19–25	22–25	18–25			59–75	Report
24 Sep	15:00	Incheon	India	3–0	Maldives	25–10	25–19	25–17			75–46	Report
25 Sep	17:00	Incheon	Hong Kong	0–3	Iran	16–25	17–25	12–25			45–75	Report
26 Sep	17:00	Incheon	Iran	3–0	India	25–22	25–22	25–18			75–62	Report
27 Sep	15:00	Ansan	Iran	3–0	Maldives	25–10	25–19	25–21			75–50	Report

==== Group D ====
Pos	Team	Pld	W	L	Pts	SW	SL	SR	SPW	SPL	SPR	Qualification
1	China	3	3	0	9	9	0	MAX	225	131	1.718	Play-off / Group E–F
2	Thailand	3	2	1	6	6	3	2.000	207	181	1.144	Play-off / Group E–F
3	Turkmenistan	3	1	2	3	3	7	0.429	184	239	0.770	Play-off / Group G–H
4	Myanmar	3	0	3	0	1	9	0.111	181	246	0.736	Play-off / Group G–H

Source: Results

Date	Time	Venue		Score		Set 1	Set 2	Set 3	Set 4	Set 5	Total	Report
21 Sep	18:00	Ansan	Myanmar	0–3	China	11–25	12–25	18–25			41–75	Report
22 Sep	18:00	Incheon	Thailand	3–0	Turkmenistan	25–22	25–16	25–17			75–55	Report
23 Sep	18:00	Ansan	China	3–0	Turkmenistan	25–15	25–8	25–10			75–33	Report
24 Sep	17:00	Incheon	Myanmar	0–3	Thailand	14–25	17–25	20–25			51–75	Report
25 Sep	19:00	Incheon	Thailand	0–3	China	16–25	19–25	22–25			57–75	Report
27 Sep	12:30	Ansan	Turkmenistan	3–1	Myanmar	25–17	27–25	19–25	25–22		96–89	Report

=== Play-off ===
- The results and the points of the matches between the same teams that were already played during the preliminary round shall be taken into account for the play-off.

==== Group E ====
Pos	Team	Pld	W	L	Pts	SW	SL	SR	SPW	SPL	SPR	Qualification
1	Iran	3	3	0	9	9	1	9.000	248	202	1.228	Quarterfinals
2	South Korea	3	2	1	6	7	3	2.333	236	226	1.044	Quarterfinals
3	Qatar	3	1	2	3	3	6	0.500	194	210	0.924	Quarterfinals
4	India	3	0	3	0	0	9	0.000	187	227	0.824	Quarterfinals

Source: Results

Date	Time	Venue		Score		Set 1	Set 2	Set 3	Set 4	Set 5	Total	Report
28 Sep	12:00	Incheon	Qatar	0–3	Iran	19–25	18–25	19–25			56–75	Report
28 Sep	14:30	Incheon	South Korea	3–0	India	25–22	27–25	25–18			77–65	Report
29 Sep	17:00	Incheon	South Korea	1–3	Iran	21–25	19–25	25–23	19–25		84–98	Report
29 Sep	19:30	Incheon	Qatar	3–0	India	25–20	25–20	25–20			75–60	Report

==== Group F ====
Pos	Team	Pld	W	L	Pts	SW	SL	SR	SPW	SPL	SPR	Qualification
1	Japan	3	3	0	9	9	1	9.000	247	188	1.314	Quarterfinals
2	China	3	2	1	6	6	4	1.500	229	209	1.096	Quarterfinals
3	Thailand	3	1	2	3	3	6	0.500	193	200	0.965	Quarterfinals
4	Kuwait	3	0	3	0	2	9	0.222	199	271	0.734	Quarterfinals

Source: Results

Date	Time	Venue		Score		Set 1	Set 2	Set 3	Set 4	Set 5	Total	Report
28 Sep	17:00	Incheon	Japan	3–0	Thailand	25–22	25–22	25–17			75–61	Report
28 Sep	19:30	Incheon	Kuwait	1–3	China	26–24	20–25	12–25	19–25		77–99	Report
29 Sep	12:00	Incheon	Kuwait	0–3	Thailand	15–25	17–25	18–25			50–75	Report
29 Sep	14:30	Incheon	Japan	3–0	China	25–18	25–20	25–17			75–55	Report

==== Group G ====
Pos	Team	Pld	W	L	Pts	SW	SL	SR	SPW	SPL	SPR	Qualification
1	Chinese Taipei	3	3	0	8	9	2	4.500	257	232	1.108	Classification 9th–12th
2	Kazakhstan	3	2	1	7	8	3	2.667	254	210	1.210	Classification 9th–12th
3	Hong Kong	3	1	2	3	3	6	0.500	207	211	0.981	Classification 13th–16th
4	Maldives	3	0	3	0	0	9	0.000	160	225	0.711	Classification 13th–16th

Source: Results

Date	Time	Venue		Score		Set 1	Set 2	Set 3	Set 4	Set 5	Total	Report
28 Sep	10:30	Ansan	Kazakhstan	3–0	Hong Kong	25–21	25–20	25–22			75–63	Report
28 Sep	13:30	Ansan	Chinese Taipei	3–0	Maldives	25–21	25–21	25–17			75–59	Report
29 Sep	10:30	Ansan	Kazakhstan	3–0	Maldives	25–18	25–9	25–15			75–42	Report
29 Sep	13:30	Ansan	Chinese Taipei	3–0	Hong Kong	25–23	25–21	27–25			77–69	Report

==== Group H ====
Pos	Team	Pld	W	L	Pts	SW	SL	SR	SPW	SPL	SPR	Qualification
1	Saudi Arabia	3	2	1	7	8	4	2.000	277	257	1.078	Classification 9th–12th
2	Pakistan	3	2	1	6	6	3	2.000	213	210	1.014	Classification 9th–12th
3	Turkmenistan	3	1	2	3	4	7	0.571	253	268	0.944	Classification 13th–16th
4	Myanmar	3	1	2	2	4	8	0.500	266	274	0.971	Classification 13th–16th

Source: Results

Date	Time	Venue		Score		Set 1	Set 2	Set 3	Set 4	Set 5	Total	Report
28 Sep	16:30	Ansan	Pakistan	3–0	Turkmenistan	30–28	25–23	25–18			80–69	Report
28 Sep	19:30	Ansan	Saudi Arabia	2–3	Myanmar	19–25	25–23	25–23	22–25	12–15	103–111	Report
29 Sep	16:30	Ansan	Pakistan	3–0	Myanmar	25–21	25–22	25–23			75–66	Report
29 Sep	19:30	Ansan	Saudi Arabia	3–1	Turkmenistan	23–25	25–19	25–20	26–24		99–88	Report

=== Classification 13th–16th ===
Semifinals 13th–16th
30 September
Maldives	1
Turkmenistan	3
30 September
Hong Kong	2
Myanmar	3

Classification 13th–14th
1 October
Turkmenistan	3
Myanmar	1
Classification 15th–16th
1 October
Maldives	2
Hong Kong	3

==== Semifinals 13th–16th ====
Date	Time	Venue		Score		Set 1	Set 2	Set 3	Set 4	Set 5	Total	Report
30 Sep	12:00	Incheon	Maldives	1–3	Turkmenistan	16–25	25–16	18–25	12–25		71–91	Report
30 Sep	14:30	Incheon	Hong Kong	2–3	Myanmar	25–18	16–25	26–24	20–25	10–15	97–107	Report

==== Classification 15th–16th ====
Date	Time	Venue		Score		Set 1	Set 2	Set 3	Set 4	Set 5	Total	Report
01 Oct	10:30	Ansan	Maldives	2–3	Hong Kong	23–25	25–20	20–25	29–27	11–15	108–112	Report

==== Classification 13th–14th ====
Date	Time	Venue		Score		Set 1	Set 2	Set 3	Set 4	Set 5	Total	Report
01 Oct	13:30	Ansan	Turkmenistan	3–1	Myanmar	17–25	25–18	25–16	25–14		92–73	Report

=== Classification 9th–12th ===
Semifinals 9th–12th
30 September
Kazakhstan	3
Saudi Arabia	2
30 September
Chinese Taipei	3
Pakistan	0

Classification 9th–10th
1 October
Kazakhstan	1
Chinese Taipei	3
Classification 11th–12th
1 October
Saudi Arabia	0
Pakistan	3

==== Semifinals 9th–12th ====
Date	Time	Venue		Score		Set 1	Set 2	Set 3	Set 4	Set 5	Total	Report
30 Sep	17:00	Incheon	Kazakhstan	3–2	Saudi Arabia	18–25	20–25	25–14	30–28	15–8	108–100	Report
30 Sep	19:30	Incheon	Chinese Taipei	3–0	Pakistan	25–19	26–24	25–19			76–62	Report

==== Classification 11th–12th ====
Date	Time	Venue		Score		Set 1	Set 2	Set 3	Set 4	Set 5	Total	Report
01 Oct	16:30	Ansan	Saudi Arabia	0–3	Pakistan	27–29	17–25	16–25			60–79	Report

==== Classification 9th–10th ====
Date	Time	Venue		Score		Set 1	Set 2	Set 3	Set 4	Set 5	Total	Report
01 Oct	19:30	Ansan	Kazakhstan	1–3	Chinese Taipei	22–25	23–25	25–15	21–25		91–90	Report

=== Final round ===
Quarterfinals
1 October
India	2
Japan	3
1 October
South Korea	3
Thailand	1
1 October
Qatar	1
China	3
1 October
Iran	3
Kuwait	0

Semifinals
2 October
Japan	3
South Korea	1
2 October
China	0
Iran	3

Gold medal match
3 October
Japan	1
Iran	3
Bronze medal match
3 October
China	1
South Korea	3

Semifinals 5th–8th
2 October
India	3
Thailand	1
2 October
Qatar	3
Kuwait	0

Classification 5th–6th
3 October
India	3
Qatar	2
Classification 7th–8th
3 October
Thailand	3
Kuwait	1

==== Quarterfinals ====
Date	Time	Venue		Score		Set 1	Set 2	Set 3	Set 4	Set 5	Total	Report
01 Oct	12:00	Incheon	India	2–3	Japan	25–20	19–25	25–23	20–25	13–15	102–108	Report
01 Oct	14:30	Incheon	Qatar	1–3	China	23–25	25–20	23–25	21–25		92–95	Report
01 Oct	17:00	Incheon	South Korea	3–1	Thailand	25–21	25–27	25–21	25–19		100–88	Report
01 Oct	19:30	Incheon	Iran	3–0	Kuwait	25–21	25–18	25–14			75–53	Report

==== Semifinals 5th–8th ====
Date	Time	Venue		Score		Set 1	Set 2	Set 3	Set 4	Set 5	Total	Report
02 Oct	11:30	Incheon	India	3–1	Thailand	22–25	25–18	25–23	25–20		97–86	Report
02 Oct	14:00	Incheon	Qatar	3–0	Kuwait	25–23	25–15	25–22			75–60	Report

==== Semifinals ====
Date	Time	Venue		Score		Set 1	Set 2	Set 3	Set 4	Set 5	Total	Report
02 Oct	16:30	Ansan	Japan	3–1	South Korea	25–19	18–25	25–18	25–23		93–85	Report
02 Oct	16:30	Incheon	China	0–3	Iran	15–25	15–25	19–25			49–75	Report

==== Classification 7th–8th ====
Date	Time	Venue		Score		Set 1	Set 2	Set 3	Set 4	Set 5	Total	Report
03 Oct	12:00	Incheon	Thailand	3–1	Kuwait	25–15	25–23	22–25	25–15		97–78	Report

==== Classification 5th–6th ====
Date	Time	Venue		Score		Set 1	Set 2	Set 3	Set 4	Set 5	Total	Report
03 Oct	14:30	Incheon	India	3–2	Qatar	25–21	20–25	25–22	20–25	15–10	105–103	Report

==== Bronze medal match ====
Date	Time	Venue		Score		Set 1	Set 2	Set 3	Set 4	Set 5	Total	Report
03 Oct	17:00	Incheon	China	1–3	South Korea	25–20	20–25	13–25	22–25		80–95	Report

==== Gold medal match ====
Date	Time	Venue		Score		Set 1	Set 2	Set 3	Set 4	Set 5	Total	Report
03 Oct	19:30	Incheon	Japan	1–3	Iran	26–28	25–23	19–25	19–25		89–101	Report

== Final standing ==
Rank	Team	Pld	W	L
1st place, gold medalist(s)	Iran	8	8	0
2nd place, silver medalist(s)	Japan	8	7	1
3rd place, bronze medalist(s)	South Korea	8	6	2
4	China	8	5	3
5	India	8	4	4
6	Qatar	8	4	4
7	Thailand	8	4	4
8	Kuwait	8	2	6
9	Chinese Taipei	7	5	2
10	Kazakhstan	7	3	4
11	Pakistan	7	3	4
12	Saudi Arabia	7	2	5
13	Turkmenistan	7	3	4
14	Myanmar	7	2	5
15	Hong Kong	7	2	5
16	Maldives	7	0	7
