= Hong Kong men's national volleyball team =

Men's national volleyball team representing Hong Kong

Hong Kong
- Association: Volleyball Association of Hong Kong (VBAHK)
- Confederation: AVC
- Head coach: Dragan Mihailovic
- FIVB ranking: 104 ▲18 (1 October 2026)

Uniforms
Home	Away	Third

Asian Championship
- Appearances: 8 (First in 1983)
- Best result: 10th (1983)
- www.vbahk.org.hk/hongkongteam/

The Hong Kong men's national volleyball team represents Hong Kong in international competitions and friendly matches, governed by Volleyball Association of Hong Kong (VBAHK).

== Competition record ==
=== Olympic Games ===
- 1964 to 2024 — Did not qualify

=== World Championship ===
- 1949 to 2025 — Did not enter or Did not qualify

=== World Cup ===
- 1965 to 2019 — Did not qualify

=== Asian Championship ===
Champions Runners up Third place Fourth place

Asian Championship record
Year	Round	Position	GP	MW	ML	SW	SL
(Australia) 1975	Did not participate						
(Bahrain) 1979	Did not participate						
(Japan) 1983	9th–11th place match	10th place	7	1	6	6	19
(Kuwait) 1987	Did not participate						
(South Korea) 1989	13th–16th place match	14th place					
(Australia) 1991	Did not participate						
(Thailand) 1993	Did not participate						
(South Korea) 1995	Did not participate						
(Qatar) 1997	Did not participate						
(Iran) 1999	Did not participate						
(South Korea) 2001	11th place match	12th place	5	0	5	0	15
(China) 2003	Did not participate						
(Thailand) 2005	17th–18th place match	18th place	4	0	4	5	12
(Indonesia) 2007	Did not participate						
(Philippines) 2009	17th–18th place match	17th place	5	1	4	3	14
(Iran) 2011	Did not participate						
(United Arab Emirates) 2013	Did not participate						
(Iran) 2015	Did not participate						
(Indonesia) 2017	15th place match	16th place	7	0	7	4	21
(Iran) 2019	15th place match	16th place	7	1	6	6	19
(Japan) 2021	13th place match	14th place	7	1	6	5	20
(Iran) 2023	15th place match	16th place	4	0	4	4	12
(Japan) 2026	Did not qualify						
Total	0 Titles	9/23	46	4	42	33	132

=== Asian Games ===
Champions Runners up Third place Fourth place

Asian Games record
Year	Round	Position	GP	MW	ML	SW	SL
(Japan) 1958	Round robin	5th place	4	0	4	2	12
(Indonesia) 1962	Did not participate						
(Thailand) 1966	Did not participate						
(Thailand) 1970	Did not participate						
(Iran) 1974	Did not participate						
(Thailand) 1978	Preliminary round	13th place	4	0	4	3	12
(India) 1982	13th–15th places	14th place	5	1	4	6	12
(South Korea) 1986	9th–12th places	11th place	8	1	7	3	21
(China) 1990	7th–8th place match	8th place	5	0	5	1	15
(Japan) 1994	Did not participate						
(Thailand) 1998	Did not participate						
(South Korea) 2002	Did not participate						
(Qatar) 2006	Preliminary round	13th place	6	2	4	6	12
(China) 2010	Preliminary round	17th place	4	0	4	0	12
(South Korea) 2014	15th–16th place match	15th place	7	2	5	9	17
(Indonesia) 2018	19th–20th place match	19th place	5	2	3	7	9
(China) 2022	Preliminary round	16th place	2	0	2	1	6
(Japan) 2026	15th–16th place match	16th place	6	0	6	5	18
Total	0 Titles	11/18	56	8	48	43	146

=== Asian Cup ===
Champions Runners up Third place Fourth place

Asian Cup record
Year	Round	Position	GP	MW	ML	SW	SL
(Thailand) 2008	Did not qualify						
(Iran) 2010	Did not qualify						
(Vietnam) 2012	Did not qualify						
(Kazakhstan) 2014	Did not qualify						
(Thailand) 2016	Did not qualify						
(Taiwan) 2018	Did not qualify						
(Thailand) 2022	Classification Pool G	11th place	4	0	4	1	12
Total	0 Titles	1/7	4	0	4	1	12

=== Asian Nations Cup ===
Champions Runners up Third place Fourth place

Asian Nations Cup record
Year	Round	Position	GP	MW	ML	SW	SL
(Sri Lanka) 2018	5th–6th place match	6th place	6	1	5	6	17
(Kyrgyzstan) 2022	Did not participate						
(Taiwan) 2023	11th–12th place match	11th place	4	2	2	7	6
(Bahrain) 2024	Did not participate						
(Bahrain) 2025	Did not participate						
(India) 2026	Did not participate						
Total	0 Titles	2/6	10	3	7	13	23

== Team ==
=== Current squad ===
The following is the Hong Kong roster for the 2022 Asian Men's Volleyball Cup.

Head Coach: (Serbia) Dragan Mihailovic

No.	Name	Date of birth	Position	Height	Weight	Spike	Block	Current club
	Siu Cheong Hung (c)	26 January 1993 (age 33)	OH	1.91 m (6 ft 3 in)	88 kg (194 lb)			
	Leung Ho Yin	26 September 1998 (age 28)	OH	1.88 m (6 ft 2 in)	81 kg (179 lb)	340 cm (130 in)	325 cm (128 in)	(Hong Kong) Dragon
	Lam Cheuk Hin	30 August 1994 (age 32)	OH	1.85 m (6 ft 1 in)	83 kg (183 lb)	320 cm (130 in)	310 cm (120 in)	
	So Chun Hin	12 July 1996 (age 30)	OP	1.88 m (6 ft 2 in)	76 kg (168 lb)	330 cm (130 in)	315 cm (124 in)	(Hong Kong) South China AA
	Chow Pak Fai	19 April 1996 (age 30)	L	1.75 m (5 ft 9 in)	68 kg (150 lb)	310 cm (120 in)	294 cm (116 in)	(Hong Kong) Yan Chai
	Sio Ka Yiu							
	Ching Hon Lam	25 January 2001 (age 25)	S	1.85 m (6 ft 1 in)	68 kg (150 lb)			
	Lam Ho Wong							
	Chiu Edmond Ka Tsun	4 February 1996 (age 30)	L	1.73 m (5 ft 8 in)	68 kg (150 lb)			
	Poon Chi Leung	30 January 1997 (age 29)	MB	1.88 m (6 ft 2 in)	74 kg (163 lb)	329 cm (130 in)	315 cm (124 in)	
	Lam Yin Chun	11 April 2001 (age 25)	OH	1.76 m (5 ft 9 in)	68 kg (150 lb)	340 cm (130 in)	320 cm (130 in)	
	Tam Chun Ho Damian	20 April 2001 (age 25)	OP	1.97 m (6 ft 6 in)	85 kg (187 lb)			
	Chung Ngai Yiu	27 October 2002 (age 24)	OH	1.86 m (6 ft 1 in)	64 kg (141 lb)			
	Wong Hei Chun	26 December 1986 (age 39)	S	1.77 m (5 ft 10 in)	65 kg (143 lb)	310 cm (120 in)	290 cm (110 in)	(Hong Kong) Yan Chai

=== Former squad ===
- Asian Men's Volleyball Championship

2021
So Chun Hin (c), Au Chin To, Lau Chi Wing, Leung Ho Yin, Cheung Yi Kit, Lam Cheuk Hin, Chow Pak Fai, Lam Ki Fung, Yuen Sze Wai, Poon Chi Leung, Lam Yi Chun, Tam Chun Ho Damian, Lai Chun Hung, Cheung Ngai Yiu. Head Coach: (Hong Kong) Yau Hok Chun.

== Notable players ==
- Henry Chan
