= Kataria =

Kataria is an Indian and Pakistani surname. Notable people with the surname include:

- Gulab Chand Kataria, Indian politician from Rajasthan, belonging to the Bharatiya Janata Party
- Lal Chand Kataria (born 1968), Indian politician from Rajasthan, belonging to the Indian National Congress
- Rattan Lal Kataria (born 1951), Indian politician from Haryana, belonging to the Bharatiya Janata Party
- Virendra Kataria (born 1933), Indian politician from Punjab, belonging to the Indian National Congress; former Lieutenant Governor of Puducherry

== See also ==
- Katariya (disambiguation)
