= Henry Chan (volleyball) =

Hong Kong volleyball player (born 1992)

Personal information
- Full name: Henry Chan
- Born: December 5, 1992 (age 33); British Hong Kong
- Height: 1.81 m (5 ft 11 in)
- Weight: 71 kg (157 lb)
- Spike: 300 cm (120 in)
- Block: 285 cm (112 in)
- Education: Rangsit University; University of Hong Kong

Volleyball information
- Position: Setter

National team
2014–2016	Hong Kong
- Last updated: March 23, 2017

Henry Chan (Chinese: 陳獻略; pinyin: Chén xiànlüè, born December 5, 1992) is a Hong Kong professional volleyball player and He has been to play setter for the Hong Kong men's national volleyball team.

== Career ==
Chan played with the club from Hong Kong South China AA (for their team Nam Ching) in 2010. He then moved on loan to the Thai club RSU for the 2016–17 season. He also played on loan with the Thai Air Force in 2017 and NK Fitness Samutsakhon for the 2017/18 season.

== Personal ==
Chan is a Chinese professional volleyball player. He has been play setter for the Hong Kong men's national volleyball team and he is Modelling and acting. He is from Hong Kong, China. He graduated from Hong Kong High School in 2009. Chan graduated from the University of Hong Kong Gatton College of Business and Economics in 2015 with a 3.9 GPA in management and marketing and returned to study at the master's level. Faculty of Economics, Rangsit University

== Clubs ==
- (Hong Kong) South China AA (2010–?)
- (Thailand) Rangsit University (2016–2017)
- (Thailand) Air Force (2017)
- (Thailand) Asia GS Samut Sakhon (2017–2018)
- (Thailand) NK Fitness Samutsakhon (2017)

== Awards ==
=== Clubs ===
- 2017 Thai–Denmark Super League - Runner-Up, with Air Force
