= Volleyball at the 1958 Asian Games – Men's tournament =

Men at the 1958 Asian Games
- Venue: Komazawa Outdoor Volleyball Court
- Date: 25–31 May 1958
- Nations: 5

Medalists
gold medal	Japan
silver medal	Iran
bronze medal	India

This page presents the results of the men's volleyball tournament at the 1958 Asian Games, which was held from 25 May to 31 May 1958 in Tokyo, Japan.

== Results ==
Pos	Team	Pld	W	L	Pts	SW	SL	SR	SPW	SPL	SPR
1	Japan	4	4	0	8	12	2	6.000	203	147	1.381
2	Iran	4	3	1	7	9	6	1.500	203	178	1.140
3	India	4	2	2	6	8	6	1.333	190	154	1.234
4	Philippines	4	1	3	5	6	11	0.545	183	230	0.796
5	Hong Kong	4	0	4	4	2	12	0.167	129	199	0.648

Source: Results

Date		Score		Set 1	Set 2	Set 3	Set 4	Set 5	Total
25 May	Hong Kong	0–3	India	10–15	12–15	13–15			35–45
25 May	Philippines	2–3	Iran	12–15	15–13	15–8	13–15	2–15	57–66
26 May	Hong Kong	0–3	Japan	4–15	1–15	4–15			9–45
27 May	Hong Kong	2–3	Philippines	15–13	7–15	15–6	13–15	11–15	61–64
27 May	India	1–3	Iran	14–16	11–15	15–9	8–15		48–55
28 May	Hong Kong	0–3	Iran	9–15	9–15	6–15			24–45
28 May	Japan	3–1	Philippines	15–11	13–15	15–10	15–13		58–49
30 May	India	3–0	Philippines	15–3	15–9	15–1			45–13
30 May	Japan	3–0	Iran	19–17	15–12	15–8			49–37
31 May	Japan	3–1	India	16–14	15–13	5–15	15–10		51–52

== Final standing ==
Rank	Team	Pld	W	L
1st place, gold medalist(s)	Japan	4	4	0
2nd place, silver medalist(s)	Iran	4	3	1
3rd place, bronze medalist(s)	India	4	2	2
4	Philippines	4	1	3
5	Hong Kong	4	0	4
