= South China AA (volleyball) =

Volleyball team in Hong Kong

South China
- Leagues: Hong Kong Men's Volleyball League A1
- Location: Hong Kong
- Team colors
- Head coach: Kanji Ng
- Ownership: South China Athletic Association

The South China Athletic Association Men's Volleyball Team (Chinese: 南華 （男子）排球隊) is a department of the South China Athletic Association (SCAA). The department was also known as the Volleyball Section (Chinese: 排球部) or South China Men's Volleyball Team (Chinese: 南華男排). The department also has another men's volleyball team known as Nam Ching (Chinese: 南青; lit. 'South [China] Youth') as well as women's volleyball team also known as "South China".

== History ==
South China's men team finished as the runner-up of 2017 President Cup (Chinese: 會長盃), losing to defending champions Dragon Team. The team also signed two Thai internationals for the competition.

== Notable players ==
- (Hong Kong) Henry Chan

== Controversies ==
In 2010, it was accused that the derby between South China and its sister team Nam Ching was match-fixed.
