= Abd al-Basit =

ʻAbd al-Bāsiṭ (ALA-LC romanization of Arabic: عبد الباسط) is a male Muslim given name. It is built from the Arabic words ʻabd and al-Bāsiṭ, one of the names of God in the Qur'an, which give rise to the Muslim theophoric names. It means "servant of the Expander".

It may refer to:

- Abdul Basit 'Abd us-Samad (1927–1988), Egyptian Qari (reciter of the Qur-an)
- Abdelbaset al-Megrahi (1952–2012), Libyan convicted of the Lockerbie bombing
- Abdulbaset Sieda (born 1956), Kurdish-Syrian academic and politician
- Amr Abdel Basset Abdel Azeez Diab, known as Amr Diab (born 1961), Egyptian singer
- Abdul Basit Mahmoud Abdul Karim, possible original name of Ramzi Yousef (born 1967), Pakistani convicted for terrorism
- Abdul Basith (volleyball) (died 1991), Indian volleyball player
- Abdul Basit, Ghanaian footballer
- Abdul Basit, Pakistani diplomat
- Abdel Basset Turki, Iraqi politician
- Hafiz Abdul Basit, Pakistani held in extrajudicial detention
- Abdul Basit (cricketer) (born 2003), Afghan cricketer
- Abdul Baset al-Sarout (1992–2019), Syrian footballer turned rebel commander
