= Khushi Ram =

Indian basketball player (1936–2013)

- Born: 7 August 1936; Jhamri, Jhajjar, Jind, Haryana
- Died: 29 December 2013 (aged 77)
- Occupations: Basketball player, coach
- Children: Ram Kumar and Ashok Kumar
- Awards: Arjuna Award, Most Valuable Player of Asia

Khushi Ram (born 7 August 1936 – 29 December 2013), widely acknowledged as The Scoring Machine of Asia, was a basketball player from India who represented India at many international competitions. He was awarded the country's highest sporting honour the Arjuna award in 1967. He captained the Indian National Basketball Team in the year 1965 which made its first appearance in Asian Basketball Championship. He represented the Indian team from 1964 to 1972. He is the father of former Indian Team captain and Dhyan Chand Award winner Ram Kumar.

== Early life and background ==
Born in Jhamri village in the Jhajjar district of Haryana in Jat Family, Khushi Ram spent his childhood in village and completed his education there. He joined Delhi based Army unit the Rajputana Rifles in 1950 as a Boy Recruit. Here began his interest for the game, looking at his 6' 4" height and good physical built the Basketball coaches in Rajputana Rifles advised him to take up the game. Khushi Ram was mentored by basketball coach Subedar Moolchand in the early stage of his career and he made his debut in National Basketball Championship in 1952 where he played for Services basketball team.

== Sporting career ==
Khushi Ram began by playing for Armed Forces in initial stages of his career. From 1958 to 1968, the time he was associated with Army, the Armed Force basketball team won the National title continuously for 10 years in which he was judged as the best player many times. Khushi Ram quickly gained popularity and became a star player in India. After taking retirement from Army in the year 1969 he moved to Kota in Rajasthan and joined Shri Ram Rayons, then he represented Rajasthan team for 5 years in National Basketball Championships.

In 1964 Khushi Ram was selected in the Indian National Basketball Team for the 4th Quardrangular tournament in Colombo. It was his international debut. The very next year in 1965 he was named as the captain of Indian team for Asian Basketball Championship which was held in Kuala Lumpur, though India's position was 7th in the tournament, Khushi Ram was the highest scorer of the tournament. He was the 2nd highest scorer in 1967 ABC Championship in Seoul where India secured 6th position. In a match played between India and Philippines, India faced a defeat by a big margin but Khushi Ram solely netted 40 points out of 63 points scored by the Indian team, his basket conversion percentage was 85% in all major international tournaments. During 1969 ABC Championship in Bangkok he once again topped the scoring charts in Asia. India progressed a level and stood 5th in the tournament. No other basketball player from India has ever been highest scorer in the Asian Basketball Championship.

In 1970 he participated in 10th Anniversary Celebrations Championship in Manila. In this tournament he scored 196 points in 7 games including 43 points against the then powerhorse of Asia and the home team Philippines, which is the highest individual score by any Indian player. Seeing his outstanding performance the organisers in Philippines awarded him the 3 honours: 1. The most valuable player of Asia 2. The most consistent shooter in Asia 3. The best centre player of the meet

At the end of the invitational tournament in Manila, former legend of Philippines Basketball Lauro Mumar who insisted Khushi Ram to leave India and play for Philippines said, "Khushi Ram has defined how Basketball is played, just unstoppable never saw a player of such a calibre and kind of mental and physical toughness he has in the entire Asia . I would just say that Give us Khushi Ram and we will conquer the entire world . He can rule the world of Basketball."

Khushi Ram is the only Basketball player from India to be honoured by these 3 prestigious trophies in his days of stardom. In the same year he was again selected to captain the Indian team for 6th Asian Games at Bangkok, but due to a severe eye injury at the training camp in NIS Patiala he could not participate in the Asian Games. In 1970, the University of Illinois Springfield basketball team of United States of America came to India to play exhibition matches against the Indian team, Springfield team was recognised as the best team of that time in US and NBA D League. As reported by a newspaper reporter "Khushi Ram is an outstanding player, Americans had a tough time while defending him and were unable to figure out on how to stop him from scoring, what a remarkable game sense he has, it's amazing to watch him in action"

"Khushi Ram might have not helped with too many assists, but he fed hell into rivals and was easily Asia's best pivot at that time."

— Gulam Abbas Moontasir

Many newspapers and magazines in country published articles on him named The Magician of Basketball as he became the best ranked player of Asia. He became an inspiration for many youngsters who were keen to take up the game.

During an interview in Mumbai in 2011 where Khushi Ram came as Guest of Honour in Savio Cup All India Tournament, a press reporter from The Hindustan Times interviewed him . The journalist asked him that Sir what keeps you glued to Basketball even in your 70's ? He smiles and says Basketball is my bread and butter, whatever I am today it's just because of this game, I love training kids and will continue to do it till my last breath . I am happy that my sons Ram Kumar and Ashok took the legacy forward and they respected the game in the same spirit as I did

== Coaching ==
Khushi Ram also contributed his services for the game as a coach. After announcing his retirement he took over as the coach of Shri Ram Rayons Basketball team in 1976 and also coached Rajasthan Basketball team for many years. Under his coaching Shri Ram Rayons was the best team in India and won many All India tournaments. Olympians Ajmer Singh, Hanuman Singh are his best gifts to the Indian Basketball, he also coached his son, Ram Kumar, and Ashok Kumar, who was also a former India captain. He was deeply associated with the game till his last breath.

During his later years, he worked as the Basketball coach at Modern School, Kota and groomed young school students in the trade of basketball. He was widely loved and regarded among the students for his coaching style.

He died on 29 December 2013 when he felt chest pain while giving away the prizes in a local function at his home town. On that day, he was very happy and was proud on the achievement of his followers/trainees. After his death, the Haryana Government has decided to build a stadium in his village Jhamri, Jhajjar District as a tribute to him because Khushi Ram's vision was the development of children through sports and education.
