= Katariya, Kutch =

Village in Gujarat, India

Coordinates: 23.293348°N 70.618433°E

Katariya is a village in Bhachau Taluka of Kutch district of Gujarat, India. The villages is now divided into two parts; Juna (old) and Nava (new) Katariya.

== Places of interest ==
A ruined Jain temple, now re-built newly and named " Katariyaji Jain Tirth", probably about 650 years old, stands in the centre of the village market place. The remains, now much hid by house foundations, seem to show that when in repair the temple stood about sixty feet high, and covered an area of about fifty feet. Above ground are the remains of three domed porches each with five well carved pillars. Under ground, reached by a stone ladder, is a chamber, the roof supported by five pillars and scalloped arches. On the side of the doorway is a figure of Ganpati.

There is a Goddesses Mahakali temple, Lord RAM temple in the village. On the railway station there is a unique Lord Hanuman Temple (Jodaliya Hanuman). The village has a gau-shala and bio-gas plant also.

On the bank of a pool in the west of the village is a small plain sandstone temple. This, dedicated to Mahadev Bhaveshwar, about ten feet square and fourteen high, has a roof rising in a pyramid of steps. The idol of Lord Shankar has two bullets mark, the story dates back to old ages where a pirate wanted to loot the village, but when he fired the idol, blood started coming out and he ran away. The portico, mandap, is incomplete. A writing on the lintel of the entrance door states that it was built in 1682 (Samvat 1739) in the time of Kunvar Shri Ravaji by a Bhatia named Vastupal, probably the chiefs manager. There is a newly swaminarayan small temple built. On the bank of the pond are two sati tombstones, one dated 1627 (Samvat 1684), the other 1707 (Samvat 1764).
