= Volleyball at the 1966 Asian Games – Men's tournament =

Men at the 1966 Asian Games
- Venue: Thammasat Gymnasium
- Date: 10–19 December 1966
- Nations: 12

Medalists
gold medal	Japan
silver medal	South Korea
bronze medal	Iran

The 1966 Men's Asian Games Volleyball Tournament was the 3rd edition of the event, organized by the Asian governing body, the AVC. It was held in Bangkok, Thailand from 10 to 19 December 1966.

== Results ==
=== Preliminary round ===
==== Pool A ====
Pos	Team	Pld	W	L	Pts	SW	SL	SR	Qualification
1	India	3	3	0	6	9	1	9.000	Final round
2	Thailand	3	2	1	5	6	4	1.500	Final round
3	Philippines	3	1	2	4	5	8	0.625	Classification 7th–12th
4	Malaysia	3	0	3	3	2	9	0.222	Classification 7th–12th

Source: Results

Date		Score		Set 1	Set 2	Set 3	Set 4	Set 5	Total
10 Dec	Thailand	3–0	Malaysia						
10 Dec	India	3–1	Philippines						
11 Dec	Thailand	3–1	Philippines						
11 Dec	India	3–0	Malaysia	15–2	15–3	15–9			45–14
12 Dec	Thailand	0–3	India						
12 Dec	Philippines	3–2	Malaysia	15–6	11–15	15–3	12–15	15–1	68–40

==== Pool B ====
Pos	Team	Pld	W	L	Pts	SW	SL	SR	Qualification
1	Japan	3	3	0	6	9	0	MAX	Final round
2	Iran	3	2	1	5	6	5	1.200	Final round
3	Republic of China	3	1	2	4	5	6	0.833	Classification 7th–12th
4	Ceylon	3	0	3	3	0	9	0.000	Classification 7th–12th

Source: Results

Date		Score		Set 1	Set 2	Set 3	Set 4	Set 5	Total
10 Dec	Japan	3–0	Iran	15–2	15–4	15–6			45–12
10 Dec	Republic of China	3–0	Ceylon						
11 Dec	Japan	3–0	Republic of China						
11 Dec	Iran	3–0	Ceylon	15–5	15–0	15–3			45–8
12 Dec	Iran	3–2	Republic of China	15–13	13–15	10–15	15–9	15–10	68–63
12 Dec	Japan	3–0	Ceylon						

==== Pool C ====
Pos	Team	Pld	W	L	Pts	SW	SL	SR	Qualification
1	South Korea	3	3	0	6	9	0	MAX	Final round
2	Indonesia	3	2	1	5	6	3	2.000	Final round
3	Pakistan	3	1	2	4	3	7	0.429	Classification 7th–12th
4	South Vietnam	3	0	3	3	1	9	0.111	Classification 7th–12th

Source: Results

Date		Score		Set 1	Set 2	Set 3	Set 4	Set 5	Total
10 Dec	South Korea	3–0	Indonesia						
10 Dec	Pakistan	3–1	South Vietnam						
11 Dec	South Korea	3–0	Pakistan						
11 Dec	Indonesia	3–0	South Vietnam						
12 Dec	Pakistan	0–3	Indonesia						
12 Dec	South Korea	3–0	South Vietnam						

=== Classification 7th–12th ===
Pos	Team	Pld	W	L	Pts	SW	SL	SR
1	Republic of China	5	5	0	10	15	1	15.000
2	Philippines	5	4	1	9	12	3	4.000
3	Pakistan	5	3	2	7	9	7	1.286
4	South Vietnam	5	2	3	7	8	11	0.727
5	Ceylon	5	1	4	6	5	12	0.417
6	Malaysia	5	0	5	5	0	15	0.000

Source: Results

Date		Score		Set 1	Set 2	Set 3	Set 4	Set 5	Total
13 Dec	Philippines	3–0	South Vietnam						
13 Dec	Pakistan	3–0	Ceylon						
13 Dec	Republic of China	3–0	Malaysia						
14 Dec	Pakistan	3–0	Malaysia						
14 Dec	Republic of China	3–1	South Vietnam						
15 Dec	Philippines	3–0	Ceylon						
15 Dec	Pakistan	3–1	South Vietnam						
16 Dec	Republic of China	3–0	Ceylon						
16 Dec	Philippines	3–0	Malaysia	18–16	15–7	15–7			48–30
17 Dec	Philippines	0–3	Republic of China						
17 Dec	Malaysia	0–3	South Vietnam						
18 Dec	Malaysia	0–3	Ceylon						
18 Dec	Philippines	3–0	Pakistan	15–0	15–0	15–0			45–0
19 Dec	Ceylon	2–3	South Vietnam						
19 Dec	Republic of China	3–0	Pakistan						

=== Final round ===
Pos	Team	Pld	W	L	Pts	SW	SL	SR
1	Japan	5	5	0	10	15	0	MAX
2	South Korea	5	4	1	9	12	4	3.000
3	Iran	5	3	2	8	10	9	1.111
4	India	5	2	3	7	7	11	0.636
5	Indonesia	5	1	4	6	7	13	0.538
6	Thailand	5	0	5	5	1	15	0.067

Source: Results

Date		Score		Set 1	Set 2	Set 3	Set 4	Set 5	Total
13 Dec	Japan	3–0	Thailand						
13 Dec	South Korea	3–1	Iran	13–15	15–3	15–11	15–9		58–38
13 Dec	India	3–2	Indonesia						
14 Dec	Japan	3–0	Indonesia						
14 Dec	South Korea	3–0	Thailand						
15 Dec	South Korea	3–0	Indonesia						
15 Dec	India	1–3	Iran	10–15	15–6	6–15	14–16		45–52
16 Dec	India	3–0	Thailand						
16 Dec	Japan	3–0	Iran						
17 Dec	Thailand	1–3	Indonesia						
17 Dec	India	0–3	Japan	5–15	1–15	0–15			6–45
18 Dec	Thailand	0–3	Iran	5–15	3–15	5–15			13–45
18 Dec	India	0–3	South Korea						
19 Dec	Japan	3–0	South Korea	15–7	15–5	15–5			45–17
19 Dec	Iran	3–2	Indonesia	15–10	10–15	13–15	15–10	15–8	68–58

== Final standing ==
Rank	Team	Pld	W	L
1st place, gold medalist(s)	Japan	8	8	0
2nd place, silver medalist(s)	South Korea	8	7	1
3rd place, bronze medalist(s)	Iran	8	5	3
4	India	8	5	3
5	Indonesia	8	3	5
6	Thailand	8	2	6
7	Republic of China	8	6	2
8	Philippines	8	5	3
9	Pakistan	8	4	4
10	South Vietnam	8	2	6
11	Ceylon	8	1	7
12	Malaysia	8	0	8
