= Achutha Kurup =

Indian volleyball player and coach (died 2017)

Achutha Kurup was an Indian volleyball player and former coach of the India national volleyball team. He is a retired Navy officer and has also served as the Director and Coach of Bengaluru SAI.

== Biography ==
He was born in Vellikulangara Thekke Aminji family in Vadakara, Kozhikode district, Kerala. He started playing volleyball at Vadakara Malabar Gymkhana Volleyball Team. In the meantime he got a job at Sriram Rayons in Jaipur.

He died on 14 November 2017 at the age of 75 in Bangalore, Karnataka.

== Career ==
Achutha Kurup, a member of the Services team for eight years, was their captain for three years. He has played for India for six years since 1966. He trained in coaching after retirement, and joined as volleyball coach at the Sports Authority of India (SAI). He was the one who took the initiative to start SAI in Bengaluru. In 1974, he became India's co-coach at the Tehran Asian Games. After working in Mauritius for three years, he became a senior coach at Patyala NIS. Then, after studying in East Germany in 1984, he became the head coach of the Indian national team in 1986. He coached the Indian team that won bronze at the 1986 Asian Games in Seoul. The team under him also won silver in the International Friendship Volleyball Championship held in Japan in 1989. He also coached the team at the 10th Don Republic Championship in Iran.

Achutha Kurup also coached the Indian women's volleyball team at the 1982 Delhi Asian Games. He also coached the Indian team at the 1987 and 1989 SAF Games. In 1988, he and Sethumadhavan were selected as the coaches of the Indian team for the 1990 Asian Games by the Indian Volleyball Federation, but due to differences with the Federation, he did not take up the position. He has also represented India as an observer in many competitions.

== Family ==
His wife Kusum is from Punjab. His wife Kusum, who played volleyball for Punjab, was a volleyball coach at SAI. His son Anandakurup and daughter Aaradhana kurup are national volleyball players. Achutha Kurup's brother Gopi was also a volleyball player.
