= Volleyball at the 1962 Asian Games – Men's tournament =

Volleyball competition

Men at the 1962 Asian Games
- Venue: Senayan Volleyball Stadium
- Date: 25 August – 2 September 1962
- Nations: 9

Medalists
gold medal	Japan
silver medal	India
bronze medal	Pakistan

This page presents the results of the men's volleyball tournament at the 1962 Asian Games, which was held from 25 August to 2 September 1962 in Jakarta, Indonesia.

== Results ==
=== Preliminary round ===
==== Pool A ====
Pos	Team	Pld	W	L	Pts	SW	SL	SR	SPW	SPL	SPR	Qualification
1	Indonesia	2	2	0	4	6	1	6.000	103	70	1.471	Final round
2	South Korea	2	1	1	3	4	3	1.333	86	65	1.323	Final round
3	Thailand	2	0	2	2	0	6	0.000	36	90	0.400	Classification 7th–9th

Source: Results

Date		Score		Set 1	Set 2	Set 3	Set 4	Set 5	Total
25 Aug	Indonesia	3–1	South Korea	15–6	15–11	13–15	15–9		58–41
26 Aug	South Korea	3–0	Thailand	15–0	15–3	15–4			45–7
27 Aug	Indonesia	3–0	Thailand	15–7	15–12	15–10			45–29

==== Pool B ====
Pos	Team	Pld	W	L	Pts	SW	SL	SR	SPW	SPL	SPR	Qualification
1	India	2	2	0	4	6	0	MAX	90	43	2.093	Final round
2	Burma	2	1	1	3	3	4	0.750	75	81	0.926	Final round
3	Cambodia	2	0	2	2	1	6	0.167	57	98	0.582	Classification 7th–9th

Source: Results

Date		Score		Set 1	Set 2	Set 3	Set 4	Set 5	Total
25 Aug	India	3–0	Burma	15–9	15–3	15–10			45–22
26 Aug	Burma	3–1	Cambodia	8–15	15–7	15–6	15–8		53–36
27 Aug	India	3–0	Cambodia	15–10	15–6	15–5			45–21

==== Pool C ====
Pos	Team	Pld	W	L	Pts	SW	SL	SR	SPW	SPL	SPR	Qualification
1	Japan	2	2	0	4	6	0	MAX	93	51	1.824	Final round
2	Pakistan	2	1	1	3	3	5	0.600	104	105	0.990	Final round
3	Philippines	2	0	2	2	2	6	0.333	70	111	0.631	Classification 7th–9th

Source: Results

Date		Score		Set 1	Set 2	Set 3	Set 4	Set 5	Total
25 Aug	Japan	3–0	Pakistan	15–9	15–13	18–16			48–38
26 Aug	Pakistan	3–2	Philippines	15–9	12–15	15–7	9–15	15–11	66–57
27 Aug	Japan	3–0	Philippines	15–4	15–6	15–3			45–13

=== Classification 7th–9th ===
Pos	Team	Pld	W	L	Pts	SW	SL	SR	SPW	SPL	SPR
1	Cambodia	2	2	0	4	6	1	6.000	97	71	1.366
2	Thailand	2	1	1	3	4	3	1.333	84	51	1.647
3	Philippines	2	0	2	1	0	6	0.000	32	91	0.352

Source: Results

Date		Score		Set 1	Set 2	Set 3	Set 4	Set 5	Total
29 Aug	Cambodia	3–0	Philippines	15–13	15–5	16–14			46–32
30 Aug	Thailand	3–0	Philippines	15–0	15–0	15–0			45–0
01 Sep	Thailand	1–3	Cambodia	8–15	15–6	13–15	3–15		39–51

=== Final round ===
Pos	Team	Pld	W	L	Pts	SW	SL	SR	SPW	SPL	SPR
1	Japan	5	5	0	10	15	4	3.750	258	160	1.613
2	India	5	4	1	9	14	6	2.333	273	225	1.213
3	Pakistan	5	2	3	7	11	9	1.222	261	221	1.181
4	Indonesia	5	2	3	7	9	11	0.818	207	259	0.799
5	South Korea	5	2	3	7	7	11	0.636	216	219	0.986
6	Burma	5	0	5	5	0	15	0.000	94	225	0.418

Source: Results

Date		Score		Set 1	Set 2	Set 3	Set 4	Set 5	Total
29 Aug	Japan	3–1	South Korea	15–3	15–7	10–15	15–9		55–34
29 Aug	India	3–2	Pakistan	15–13	8–15	13–15	16–14	15–7	67–64
29 Aug	Indonesia	3–0	Burma	15–10	15–9	15–9			45–28
30 Aug	India	3–0	Burma	15–3	15–8	15–11			45–22
30 Aug	Japan	3–1	Pakistan	15–7	5–15	15–12	15–8		50–42
30 Aug	Indonesia	2–3	South Korea	3–15	11–15	15–8	15–11	10–15	54–64
31 Aug	India	2–3	Japan	15–9	6–15	15–9	8–15	12–15	56–63
31 Aug	South Korea	3–0	Burma	15–12	15–5	15–0			45–17
31 Aug	Indonesia	3–2	Pakistan	17–15	15–6	2–15	11–15	15–13	60–64
01 Sep	Indonesia	1–3	India	9–15	15–13	4–15	8–15		36–58
01 Sep	Japan	3–0	Burma	15–6	15–4	15–6			45–16
01 Sep	South Korea	0–3	Pakistan	14–16	6–15	13–15			33–46
02 Sep	India	3–0	South Korea	15–12	15–13	17–15			47–40
02 Sep	Indonesia	0–3	Japan	1–15	1–15	10–15			12–45
02 Sep	Burma	0–3	Pakistan	6–15	3–15	2–15			11–45

== Final standing ==
Rank	Team	Pld	W	L
1st place, gold medalist(s)	Japan	7	7	0
2nd place, silver medalist(s)	India	7	6	1
3rd place, bronze medalist(s)	Pakistan	7	3	4
4	Indonesia	7	4	3
5	South Korea	7	3	4
6	Burma	7	1	6
7	Cambodia	4	2	2
8	Thailand	4	1	3
9	Philippines	4	0	4
