= Lavmeet Katariya =

Indian volleyball player (born 1993)

Personal information
- Full name: Lavmeet Katariya
- Born: 7 September 1990 (age 36)
- Height: 197 cm (6 ft 6 in)
- Weight: 88 kg (194 lb)
- Spike: 359 cm (141 in)
- Block: 330 cm (130 in)

Volleyball information
- Position: Universal & blocker
- Current club: Rajasthan
- Number: 10

Career
Teams
	Rajasthan

National team
2009- Present	India

Lavmeet Katariya, known simply as Lavmeet, is a member of India men's national volleyball team and wears the Number 10 jersey. Lavmeet plays as a middle blocker/middle hitter.

He has led the Rajasthan men's team in the Indian national volleyball meet, and the Indian men's team in the Asian Men's U20 Volleyball Championship.

He has won a gold medal in 12th south Asian games winning the best blocker award. He won a silver medal in 2014 Asia Cup.
