= Katariya, Ambedkar Nagar district =

Katariya
- Census town
- Location in Uttar Pradesh, India
- Coordinates: 26.601306°N 82.583277°E
- Country: India
- State: Uttar Pradesh
- District: Ambedaker Nagar

Population (2001)
  - Total: 3,888

Languages
  - Official: Hindi
- Time zone: UTC+5:30 (IST)

Katariya is a census town in Ambedaker Nagar district in the Indian state of Uttar Pradesh.

== Demographics ==
As of 2001 India census, Katariya had a population of 3,888. Males constitute 54% of the population and females 46%. Katariya has an average literacy rate of 69%, higher than the national average of 59.5%: male literacy is 76%, and female literacy is 60%. In Katariya, 13% of the population is under 6 years of age.

Religions in Katariya
Religion	Percent
Hindus	50%
Muslims	49%
Jains	0.5%
Others†	0.5%
Distribution of religions †Includes Sikhs (0.2%), Buddhists (<0.2%).
