= Ram Kumar (basketball) =

Indian basketball player-coach

- Born: 4 February 1964 (age 62); Dwaraka, Delhi
- Parent: Khushi Ram
- Awards: Dhyan Chand Award

Ram Kumar Ghalawat (born 4 February 1964) is a former Indian basketball player and current coach. He is currently the coach of the Rail Coach Factory, Kapurthala team, and has been a long-standing coach of the Indian Railways men's team. From 1985 to 1996 and represented India at several international championships. He also served as captain from 1991 to 1995. He played the position of shooting guard. In the national championships, Ram Kumar represented Indian Railways and during his playing days, won eight gold, three silver, and three bronze medals. Ram Kumar is the son of former basketball player Khushi Ram, an Arjuna awardee and the brother of Ashok Kumar, also an India international player. Considered India's best all-time shooter, He is the 2003 recipient of India's highest sporting honor, the Dhyan Chand Award, for lifetime achievement in sports.

== Career ==
He started his career in the year 1983, playing his first national championship at Calicut. Ram Kumar first joined income tax department in Jaipur, and moved to Western Railway in the year 1987. He followed his father Khushi Ram's footsteps and became a basketball player. He was honoured by prestigious Dhyan Chand Award in the year 2003 and also Maharana Pratap Award in the year 1989 for being the best sportsman of Rajasthan. Kumar has notably worked as a senior officer at Rail Coach Factory at Kapurthala. In 2010, he was the coach of Indian team that won the Asia zone qualifying round for the 21st FIBA Asia Cup Basketball Championship, and coached the under-18 national team at the junior Asian championship held at Tehran in 2004. In October 2026, he became the assistant-mentor of Bhutan men's national basketball team.

== Awards and honors ==
- Dhyan Chand Award (2003)
- Maharana Pratap Award (1989)
- Rail Minister Award (1994)
