= Katariya, Ghazipur district =

Katariya Kataria
- village
- Location in Uttar Pradesh, India Katariya (India)
- Coordinates: 25.689336°N 83.793018°E
- Country: India
- State: Uttar Pradesh
- District: Ghazipur

Government
  - Body: Panchayat

Population (2001)
  - Total: 350

Languages
  - Official: Hindi
- Time zone: UTC+5:30 (IST)
- PIN: 233301
- Vehicle registration: UP-
- Website: up.gov.in

Katariya is a village in Ghazipur district of Uttar Pradesh, India. It comes under the Varachakwar block and is administered by a panchayat.
