= Tom Joseph =

Indian volleyball player (born 1980)

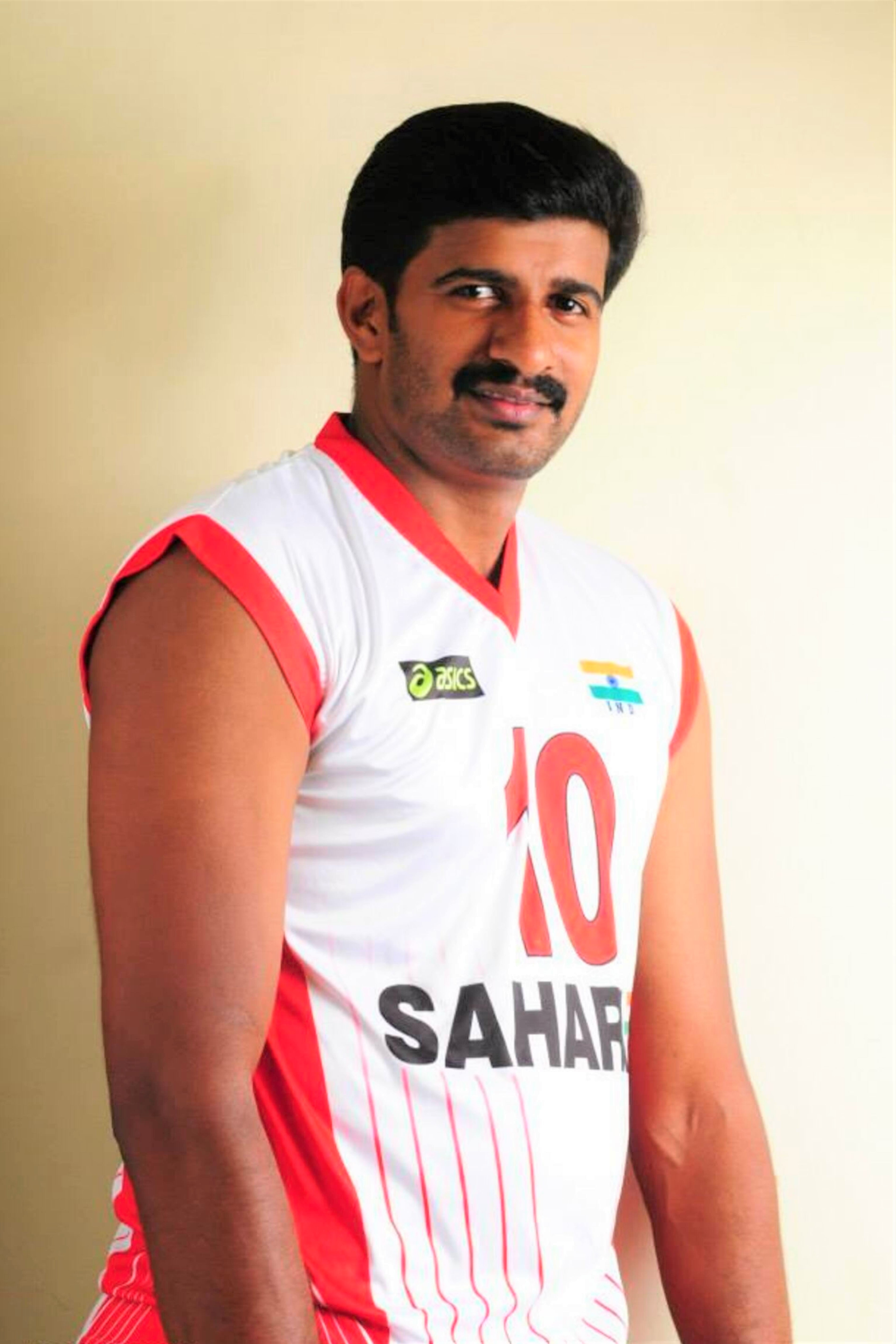

Personal information
- Born: January 1, 1980 (age 46) Kozhikode, Kerala, India
- Height: 1.95 m (6 ft 5 in)

Volleyball information
- Current club: Hyderabad Black Hawks (head coach)

National team
- Years: Team
- –: India

Tom Joseph (1 January 1980 in Kozhikode) is an Indian former volleyball captain who played for India in many international competitions. He was the coach of Indian national team during the Asian Games 2023 and the head coach of a Prime Volleyball League team. He got the Arjuna Award in 2014 for his great performance in volleyball throughout the year.

== Early life ==
He was born on 1 January 1980 in Kozhikode.

== Career ==
He led the Indian National Volleyball Team during the Rashid Memorial International Volleyball Tournament held in Dubai in 2000 when it won the gold medal. Joseph represented India in two Asian Games and four Asian Volleyball Championships. He also played at the 2009 World championship qualifiers in Tehran. At the national level championships, Joseph played for his home state Kerala and helped Kerala winning the National Volleyball Championship in more than one occasions.

== Awards ==
- Arjuna Award - 2014
- GV Raja Award - 2013
- Jimmy George Award - 2009
- JCI International Award - 2010
- Youth Icon Award - 2014
- Veera Maruthi Puraskaram - 2013
- E.S Kunjikilavan Master Puraskaram - 2013
- Pattiam Gopalan Award - 2013
- Ekalavya Puraskaram - 2013
- Chattambi Swami Puraskaram - 2013
- Janasakthi Puraskaram - 2013
- T Govindan Kayika Puraskaram - 2013
- Sportsmanship Award USA, Miami - 2014
- Vocational Excellence Award by Rotary Club - 2014
- 5th KIES State Excel Award - 2016
- Sreerama Puraskaram - 2018
