= R. K. Purohit =

Indian volleyball player (born 1951)

Ram Krishan Purohit is a former Indian Volleyball player. He hails from Jodhpur. He was awarded the Arjuna award in 1984 by the Government of India for his achievements.
