= Jimmy George =

Indian volleyball player

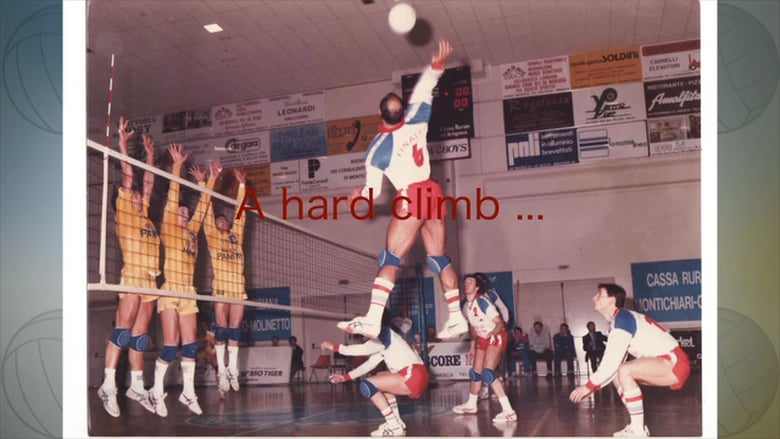
- Jimmy George smashing the ball

Personal information
- Full name: Jimmy George
- Born: 8 March 1955; Thundiyil, Peravoor, Kannur, Kerala, India
- Died: 30 November 1987 (aged 32)
- Hometown: Kerala, India
- Height: 1.87 m (6 ft 1 1/2 in)
- Weight: 78 kg (172 lb)
- Education: St. Thomas College, Palai; Government Medical College, Thiruvananthapuram

Career
| Years | Teams |
|---|---|
| 1979–1982; 1982–1986; 1986–1987 | Abu Dhabi Sports Club; Pallavolo Treviso; Pallavolo Gabeca |

National team
| India |
Honours
Representing India
Asian Games
| Bronze medal – third place | 1986 Seoul | Team competition |

Jimmy George (8 March 1955 – 30 November 1987) was an Indian volleyball player and captain of the Indian national volleyball team. Often dubbed the God of Indian volleyball, he is considered as one of the greatest volleyball players of all time.

He learned volleyball from his father. In 1979, he became the first Indian to become a professional volleyball player and played for multiple clubs outside the country, most notably in Italy. He still remains the youngest volleyball player to receive the Arjuna Award, one of India's highest national sporting awards.

== Career ==
Jimmy George was born to the Kudakkachira family, at Thundiyil near Peravoor in Kannur, as the second son of George Joseph and Mary George. He learned to play volleyball from his father, a former university-level player. Jimmy played for St. Joseph's High School, Peravoor and in 1970, became a member of the University of Calicut volleyball team. In 1971, at the age of 16, he secured a berth in the Kerala State team and went on to represent the State nine times. In 1973, he joined St. Thomas College, Pala and represented the University of Kerala from 1973 to 1976. The team won all four All India Inter-University Championship titles during these four years. He became the captain of the team in 1973.

In 1976, Jimmy was in his first year of medical college before joining the Kerala Police where he remained a member of the Kerala Police team until his death. He took leave from the Kerala Police in 1979 and went to the Persian Gulf to play for Abu Dhabi Sports Club. In 1982, he left Abu Dhabi to join the Italian Volleyball League and played for Coletto Treviso, of Treviso for a season. He then switched to System Impiani and played for them in 1983–84. He returned to India and rejoined Kerala Police where played his last Nationals at Kanpur in 1985. Jimmy went back to Italy to play for Arrital team and for 1987–88 season, he signed with Eurostyle-Eurosiba, a top division club based in Montichiari, Brescia.

Jimmy played for India's national volleyball team in the Asian Games in Tehran (1974), Bangkok (1978) and in Seoul (1986) where India won the bronze medal. He was captain of the Indian team that played at Saudi Arabia in 1985, and led the team to victory in India Gold Cup International Volleyball Tournament at Hyderabad in 1986.

== Awards and honours ==
At age 21, Jimmy George was the youngest volleyball player to win the Arjuna Award. He was given the G.V. Raja Award in 1975 and won the Manorama Award, for the best sportsman of Kerala, in 1976. He was judged the best player in the Persian Gulf region while playing for Abu Dhabi Sports Club, from 1979–1982. He played as a professional in Italy from 1982–1984 and 1985–1987, and in his prime was considered one of the best attackers of the world. In 2000, Malayala Manorama, a newspaper in Malayalam, honored him as the best sportsman of Kerala of the 20th century.

== Death and legacy ==
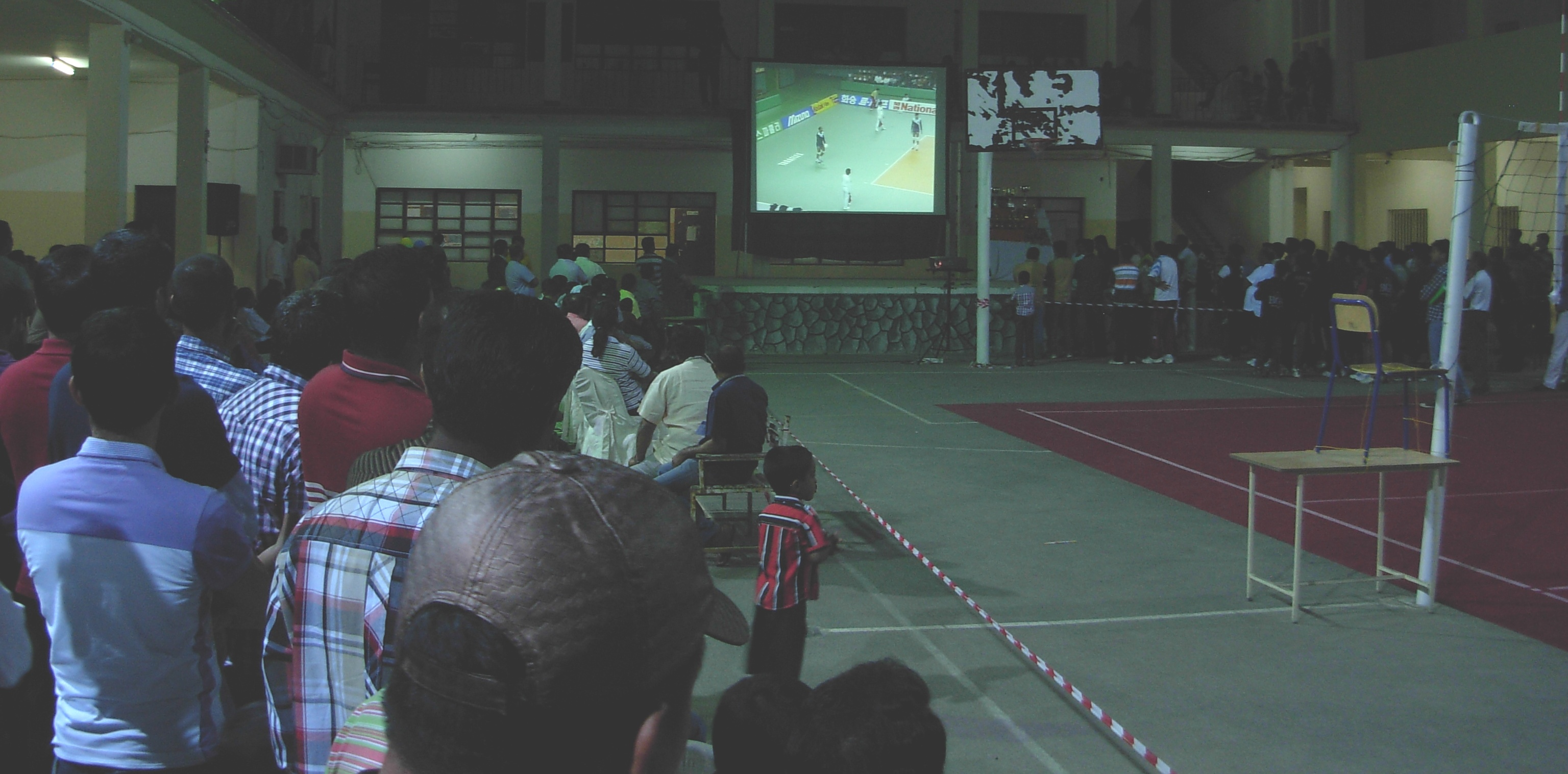
The volleyball match which Indian Team won the bronze medal in Seoul Asian Games (1986) displayed in Kuwait (April 2012) in memory of Jimmy George.

George died in a car accident in Italy on 30 November 1987, at the age of 32. His funeral ceremony was attended by thousands of people from different parts of the state. He was cremated at the cemetery of St. Joseph's Church, Peravoor. Following his death, the Jimmy George Foundation was established, which in 1989 instituted the "Jimmy George Foundation Award for best sportsperson of Kerala". The foundation also makes available cash awards at St. Joseph's High School, Peravoor, and at Devagiri College.

George is considered one of the greatest volleyball players of all-time, particularly among Indian players. The Government of Kerala named an indoor stadium at Thiruvananthapuram after him, which was later developed into a sports hub. At St. Thomas College, Pala, a volleyball stadium is named after him, as were a stadium of St. Joseph's Higher Secondary School and a road at Peravoor. At Kannur, the District Headquarters, Police Department named its conference hall in the name of Jimmy George. In Italy, an indoor stadium called PalaGeorge was dedicated to him at Montichiari, Brescia, and an annual junior tournament is organized in his memory. Since 1989, the Kerala Volleyball League of North America organizes the Jimmy George Super Trophy Volleyball Tournament.Kerala Social Centre, organizes the Jimmy George Memorial Trophy Volleyball Tournament in Abu dhabi
