= Shyam Sunder Rao =

Indian volleyball player and coach

Shyam Sunder Rao is a former Indian volleyball player and coach. He is a recipient of Arjuna award in 1974, and, in 1995, the Dronacharya award.
