= A. Palanisamy =

Indian volleyball player (died 2007)

- Born: 1932; Kallampatti, Madurai, Tamil Nadu, India
- Died: 12 November 2007 (aged 74)
- Occupation: volleyball player

A. Palanisamy (died 12 November 2007) was a volleyball player from Tamil Nadu, India. He represented the country in the Asian Games in early 60's. He hailed from Kallampatti near Melur, Madurai district, Tamil Nadu. He was nicknamed as Black Panther because of his ferocious attacks in 1962 Asian games held in Jakarta. He was named Asia's No 1 player in 1962. He was the first player to receive the Arjuna Award in 1961 in the volleyball category. He was the coach for Sivaganga district in Tamil Nadu before retiring in 1998.
