= G. E. Sridharan =

Indian volleyball player (born 1954)

SRIDHARAN G.E.
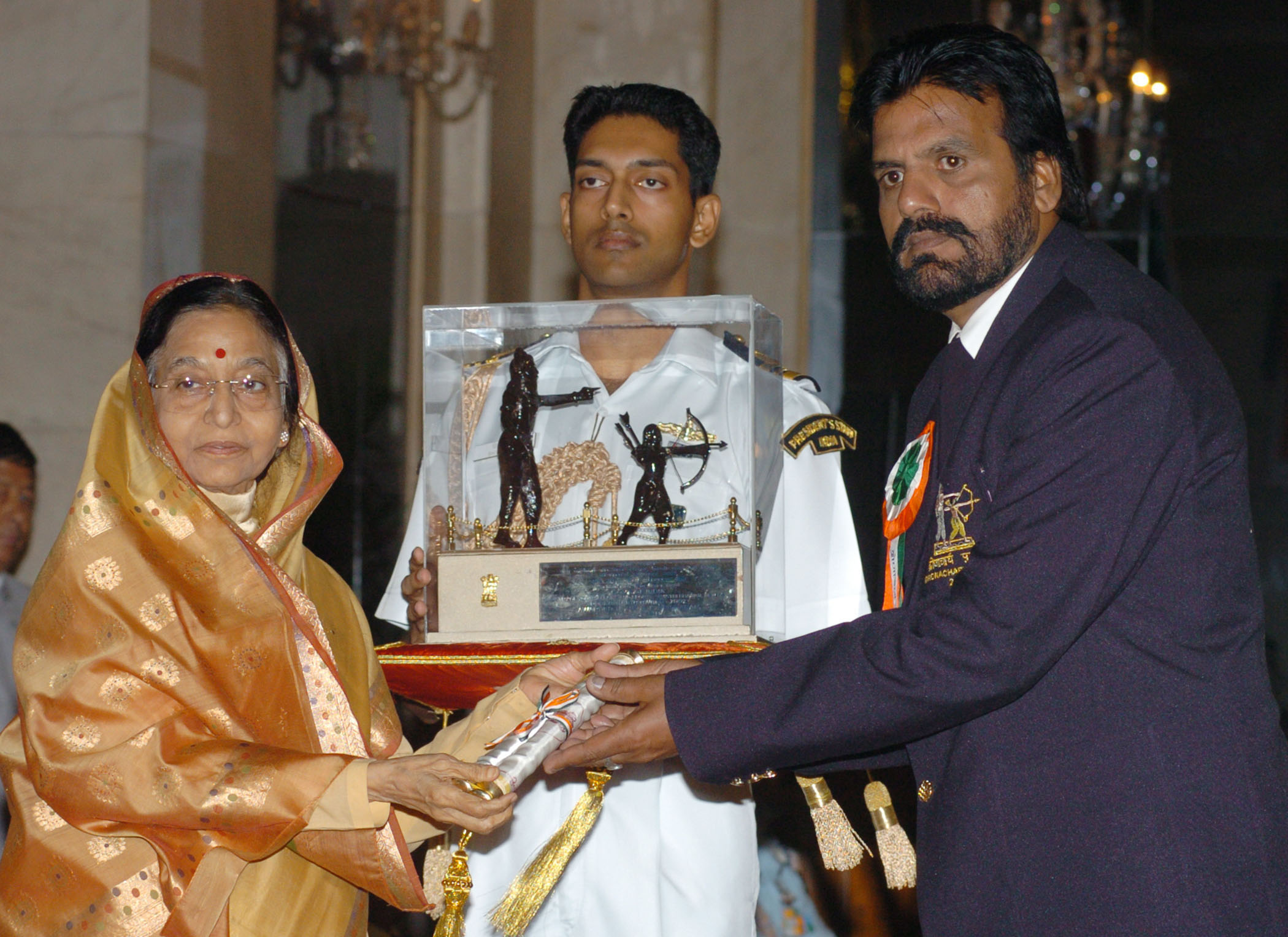
- The President, Smt. Pratibha Devisingh Patil presenting the Dronacharya Award – 2007, to Shri, G.E. Sridharan (Volley Ball), in New Delhi on 29 August 2008.

Personal information
- Nationality: Indian
- Born: 14 January 1954 (age 72) Poonamallee, Tamil Nadu, India
- Home town: Coimbatore
- Height: 1.92 m (6 ft 3 1/2 in)
Honours
- Arjuna Award
- Dronacharya Award

G E Sridharan is a former India men's national volleyball team player from Tamil Nadu, India who played during the late 1970s to late 1980s. He was the second player from Tamil Nadu to receive Arjuna Award in 1982. He is also the former coach of the Indian men's national team and the Tamil Nadu State Volleyball team. He's one of the efficient coach who took Indian youth volleyball to a new height winning gold in Asian volleyball Championship. He was awarded Dronacharya Award in 2008, which many people feel its given too late in his life, seeing his achievements list lying before.
