= Suresh Kumar Mishra =

Indian volleyball player (born 1953)

Suresh Mishra
Personal information
- Full name: Suresh kumar mishra
- Born: Lachhmangarh, Sikar, Rajasthan, India

Sport
- Country: India
- Sport: Volleyball
- Team: Indian volleyball association

Suresh Kumar Mishra is a former Indian volleyball team captain in Asian Games held at Bangkok in 1978. He belongs from Laxmangarh, Sikar, Rajasthan. He was born in Laxmangarh on 25 September 1953. He was awarded the Arjuna Award in 1979 by the Government of India for his achievements. After winning the Arjuna award, he was the coach of Abu Dhabi police volleyball team from 1980 to 1995.
