= Abdul Basith (volleyball) =

Indian volleyball player

Abdul Basith Siddiqui was a captain of the India men's national volleyball team. He was a member of the team that won the bronze medal in the 1986 Seoul Asian games, beating Japan. He also represented India in Asian games of 1978 and 1982.

Abdul Basith was born in Hyderabad in 1959 and then died in 1991. He was awarded the Arjuna Award in 1989.
