= Manathana =

- Town
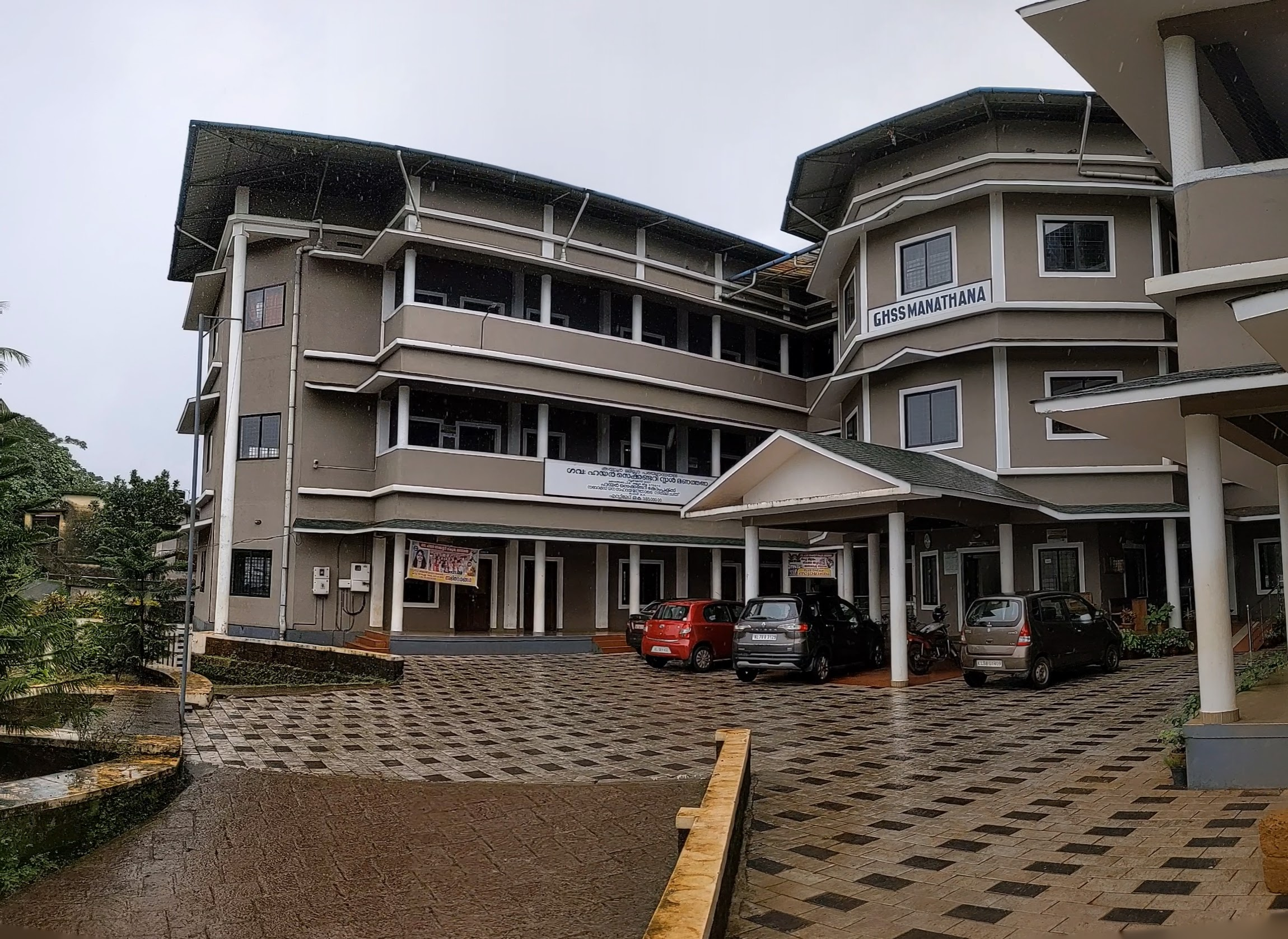
- Government Higher Secondary School, Manathana

- Location in Kerala, India Manathana (India)
- Coordinates: 11°54′45″N 75°45′25″E
- Country: India
- State: Kerala
- District: Kannur

Government
  - Body: Peravoor Grama Panchayat

Area
  - Total: 18.02 km^{2} (6.96 sq mi)

Population (2011)
  - Total: 15,935
  - Density: 884.3/km^{2} (2,290/sq mi)

Languages
  - Official: Malayalam, English
- Time zone: UTC+5:30 (IST)
- Postal code: 670674
- Telephone code: 0490
- ISO 3166 code: IN-KL
- Vehicle registration: KL-78

Manathana is a small town in Peravoor Grama Panchayat of Kannur district, Kerala, India. Manathana is bordered to aralam farm

Manathana belongs to Peravoor Assembly constituency under Kannur Loksabha constituency. The village has signs of very early human settlement. This town has seven temples and remnants of some other temples or such structures. The history of Pazhassi Raja, the Lion of Kerala, has been related to this small village. The folk songs of this region indicate that an earlier form of democratic administrative system had prevailed here.

== Location ==
Manathana is located 3.5 km (2.2 mi) east of Peravoor, 16 km (9.9 mi) from Iritty, 43.5 km (27.0 mi) from Thalassery, 36 km (22 mi) from Mananthavady (Wayanad District). The Aralam Wildlife Sanctuary is located nearby. The nearest railway station is at Thalassery of about 43 km (27 mi) away. The Kannur airport is located 30 km (19 mi) west of Manathana.

== Historical importance ==
Pazhassi Raja's Kizhakke Kovilakm was situated in Manathana.

== Demographics ==
As of 2011 Census, Manathana village had a population of 15,935 with 7,554 males and 8,381 females. Manathana village spreads over an area of 18.02 km^{2} (6.96 sq mi) with 3,777 families residing in it. The sex ratio of Manathana was 1,109, higher than the state average of 1,084. The population of children in the age group 0-6 was 1,619 (10.2%), where 800 are males and 819 are females. Manathana had an overall literacy of 93.4%, where male literacy stands at 96.3% and female literacy was 90.9%.

== Educational institutions ==
- Govt. Higher Secondary School, Manathana

== Tourism ==
Manathana and the surrounding areas have a choice of tourism attractions.

1. Aralam Wildlife Sanctuary
2. Pazhassi Dam and garden
3. Kanjirakkolly waterfalls
4. Coorg valleys
5. Palchuram
6. Barapole hydroelectric project
7. Central State farm at Aralam
8. Steel girder bridge at Iritty built by British
9. Wayanad

== Transportation ==
The national highway passes through Thalassery town. Mangalore and Mumbai can be accessed on the northern side and Cochin and Thiruvananthapuram can be accessed on the southern side. The road to the east of Iritty connects to Mysore and Bangalore. The nearest railway station is on Thalassery. The nearest airport is Kannur. There are airports at Kannur and Calicut.
