= Nedumpoil =

- village
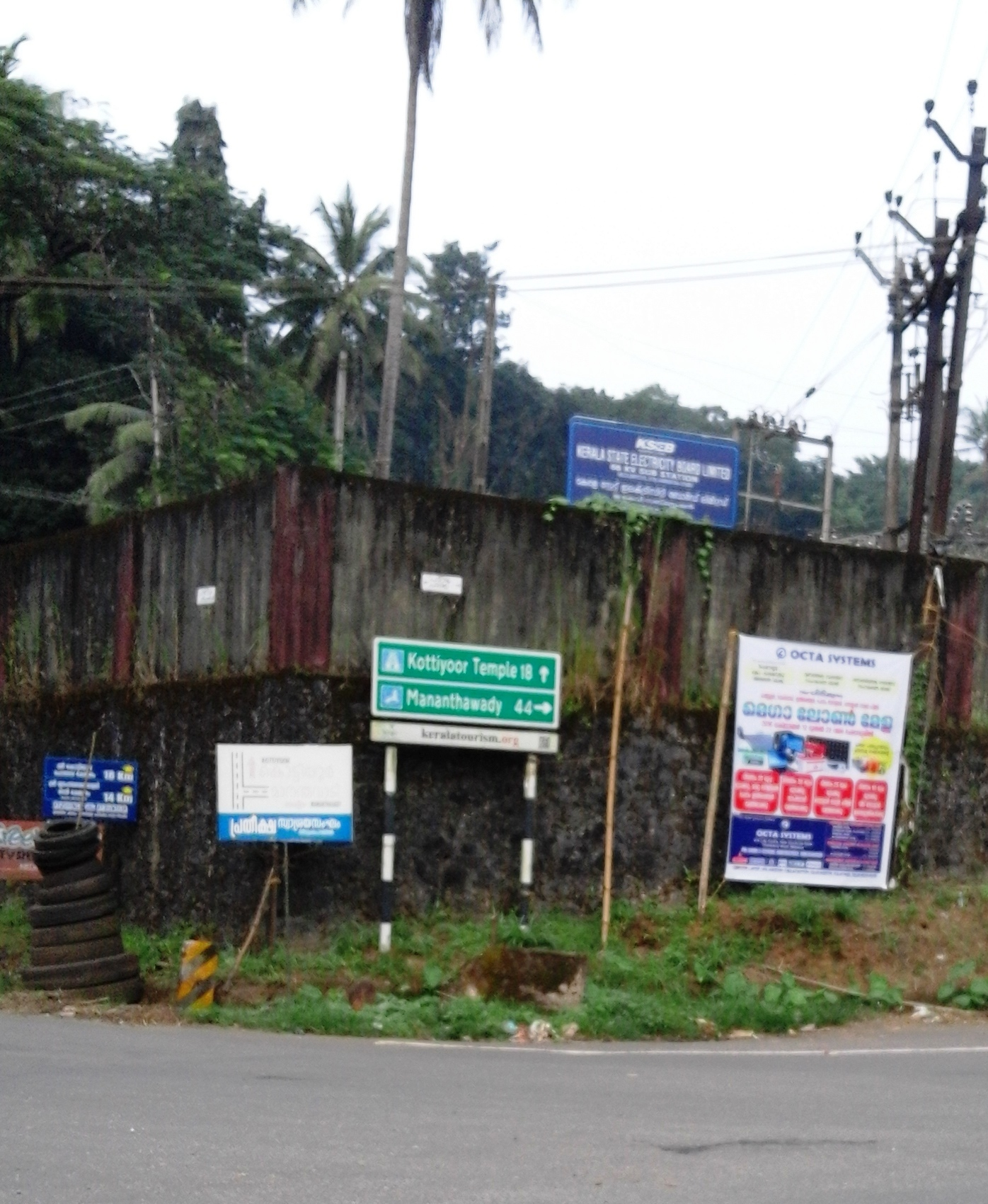
- Nedumpoil Junction

- Location in Kerala, India Nedumpoil (India)
- Coordinates: 11.8540°N 75.7467°E
- Country: India
- State: Kerala
- District: Kannur

Government
  - Body: Kolayad Grama Panchayat

Languages
  - Official: Malayalam, English
- Time zone: UTC+5:30 (IST)
- PIN: 670650
- Telephone code: 0490
- ISO 3166 code: IN-KL
- Vehicle registration: KL 78
- Assembly constituency: Peravoor
- Lok Sabha constituency: Kannur

Nedumpoil is a hilly village in the Kannur district of Kerala, India. It is situated between two major towns, Thalassery and Mananthavady.

== Border town ==
Nedumpoil sits at the junction of roads from Thalassery (through Kuthuparamba) to Kottiyoor and Manathavady. An electrical substation is located there, which provides power for the nearby areas - Kolayad, Kommery, Peravoor, Thundiyil, Kottiyoor, Nedumpuramchal, Elapeedika, Perumthody, Poolakutty etc. There is a goat farm at Kommery near to nidumpoil.

Nedumpoil is a convenient stopping point for vehicles traveling to Mananthavady and Sultan Bathery, because after that point the road is more difficult.

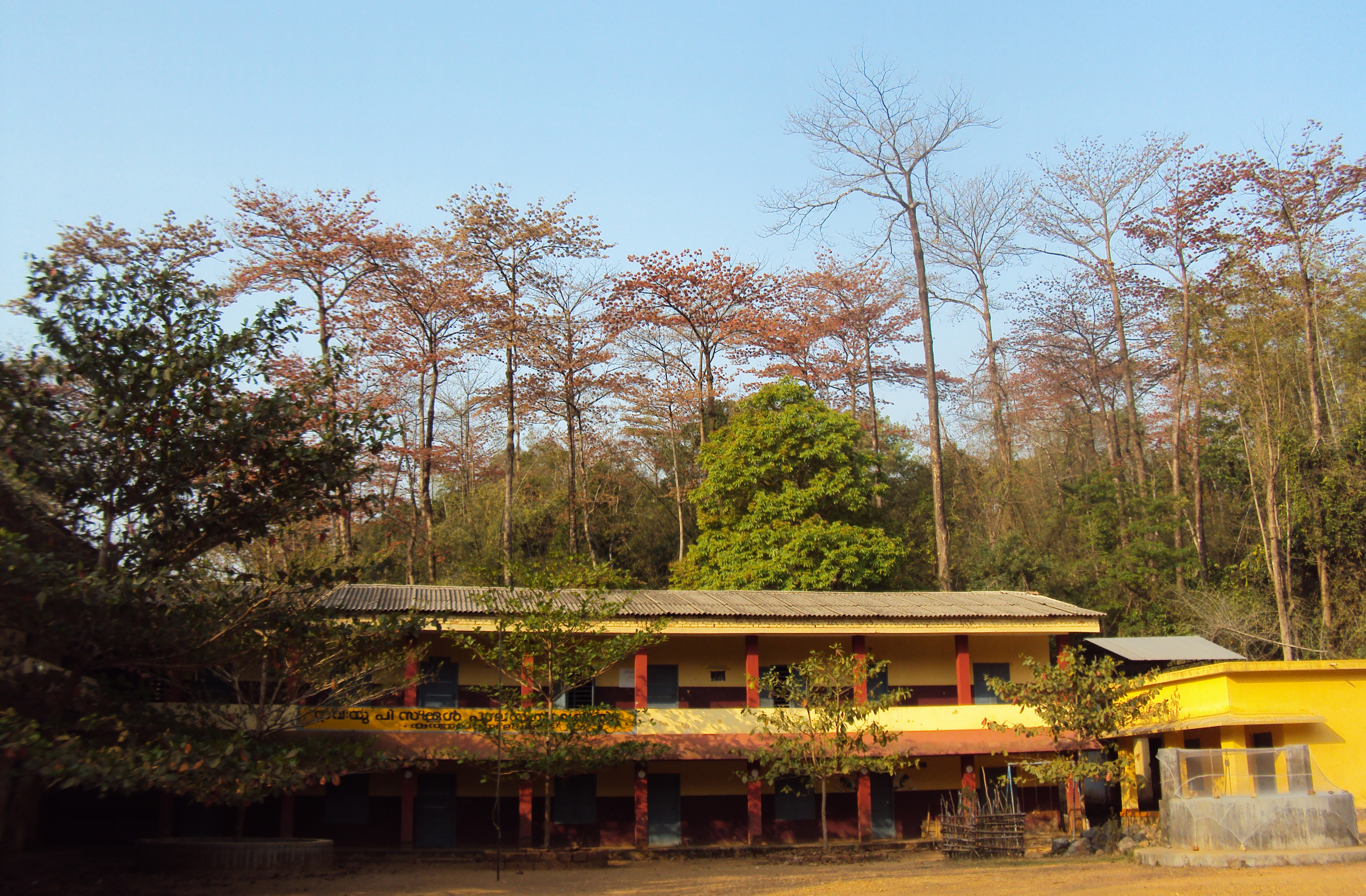
Government Primary School, Palayathuvayal

== Transportation ==
The national highway passes through Kannur town. Mangalore and Mumbai can be accessed on the northern side and Cochin and Thiruvananthapuram can be accessed on the southern side. The road to the east connects to Mysore and Bangalore. The nearest railway station is Kannur on Mangalore-Palakkad line. The nearest airport is Kannur International Airport.There are airports at Mangalore and Calicut.

== See also ==
- Kottiyoor
- Peravoor
- Kannavam
