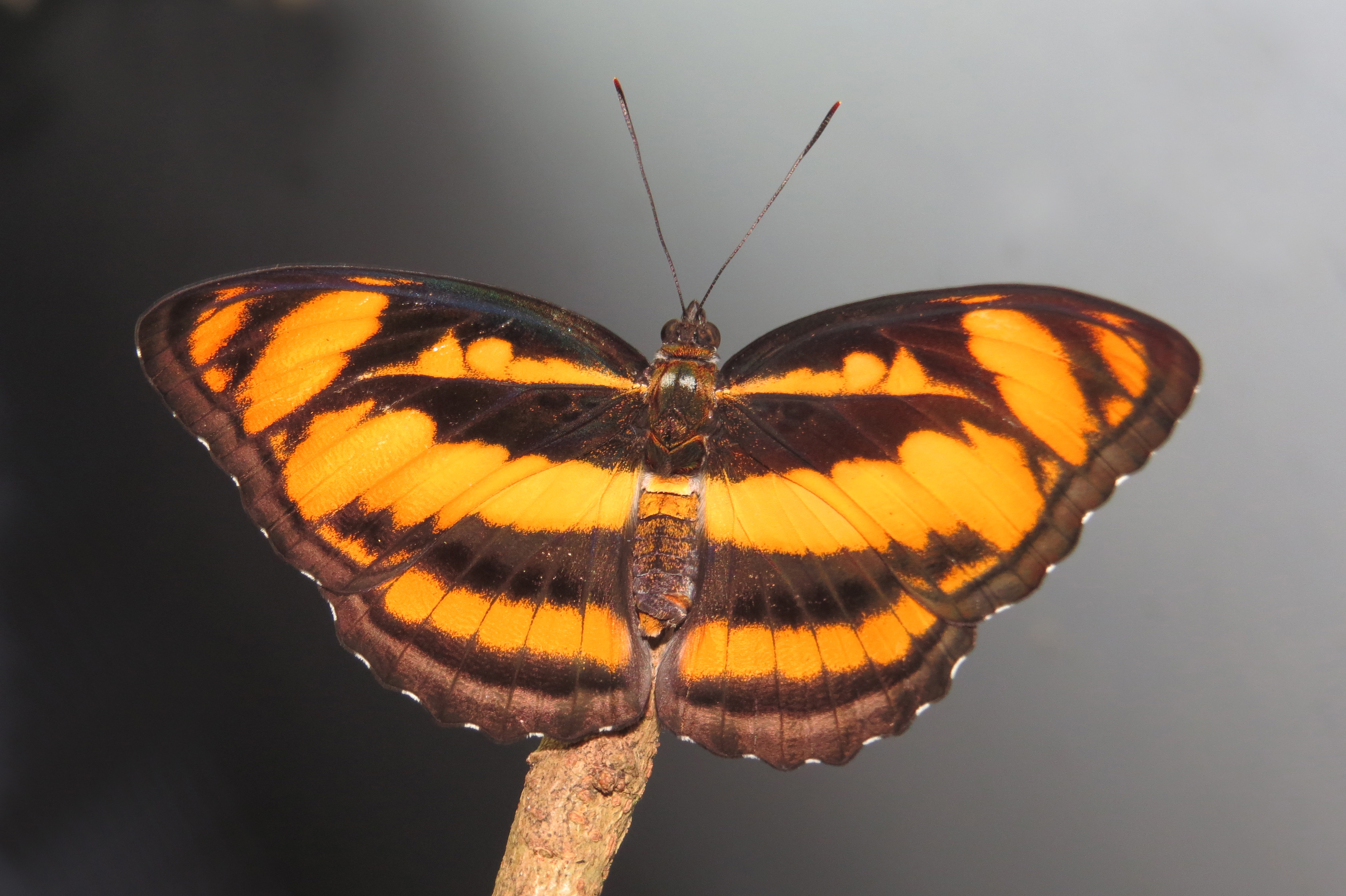
- Female, at Peravoor
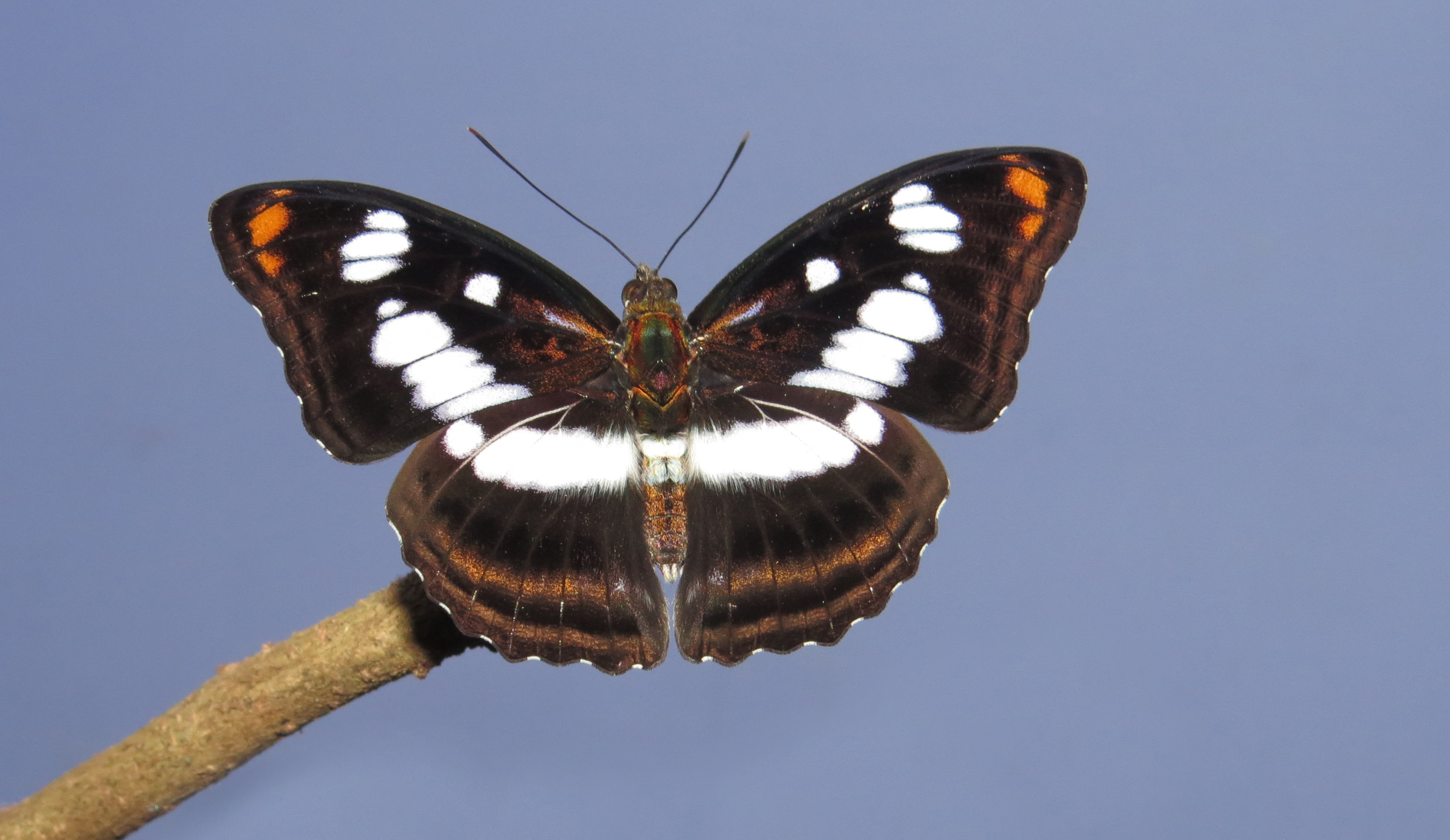
- Male, at Peravoor

Scientific classification
- Kingdom: Animalia
- Phylum: Arthropoda
- Class: Insecta
- Order: Lepidoptera
- Family: Nymphalidae
- Genus: Athyma
- Species: A. nefte

Binomial name
- Athyma nefte (Cramer, 1780)

Subspecies
- Several, including: Athyma nefte asita Moore, 1858; Athyma nefte nefte (Cramer, 1780); Athyma nefte subrata Moore, 1858; Athyma nefte inara (Doubleday, 1850); Athyma nefte seitzi (Fruhstorfer, 1906)

= Athyma nefte =

Colour sergeant

Species of butterfly

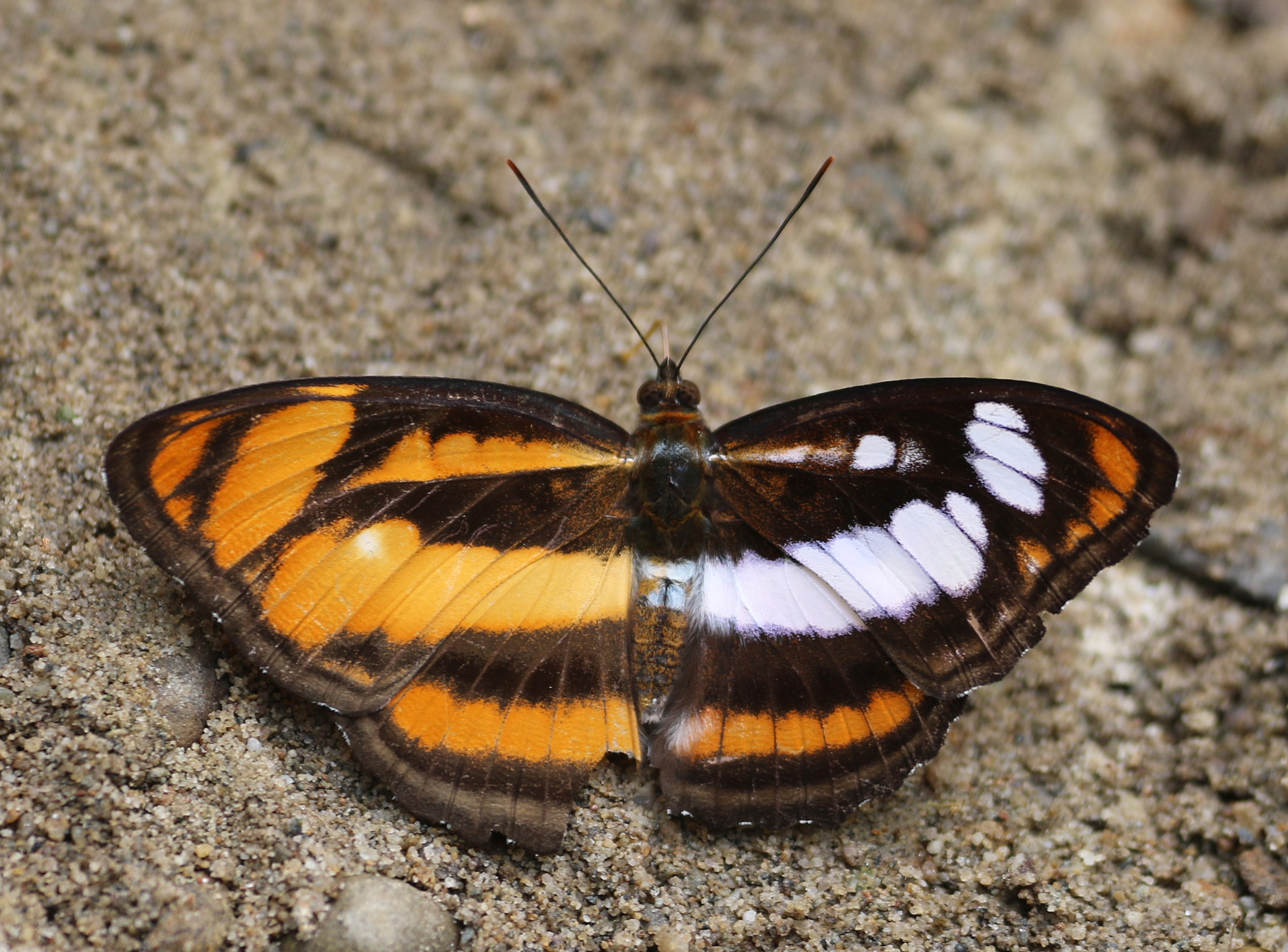
First record of a live gynandromorph of a colored sergeant from India

Athyma nefte, the colour sergeant, is a species of brush-footed butterfly found in tropical South and Southeast Asia.

== Description ==
Description based on Bingham.

=== Athyma nefte nivifera ===
Borneo and Malay Peninsula.

Male: upperside black with snow-white markings more or less edged with irrorations of blue scales. Forewing: discoidal streak obscurely divided and uneven along its upper margin; a much-curved and broadly interrupted discal band white; the latter composed of three outwardly oblique quadrate spots in interspaces 1 u9 1 and 2, and three oblong spots inclined inwards in interspaces 4, 5 and 6, no spot in interspace 3; beyond this an inner and an outer subterminal pale line divided by a transverse narrow black band, the former terminating near apex in an obliquely placed small narrow white spot.

Hindwing: the discal band of the forewing continued as a subbasal transverse white band: a postdiscal, narrower, more or less macular band also white, and a very distinct pale, still narrower, subterminal band. The interspace between the postdiscal and the subterminal bands darker than the general ground colour of the wing, and the postdiscal band on the inner side margined with similarly coloured cone-shaped marks.

Underside brown, the white markings as on the upperside but somewhat diffuse, the interspaces of the ground colour more or less blotched with darker brown, forming on the hindwing a conspicuous discal transverse series of spots in the interspaces; the dorsal margin of the hindwing broadly bluish white.

Antennae, head, thorax and abdomen above dark brownish black, the thorax and base of the abdomen respectively crossed by a bar of bluish white; beneath, the palpi, thorax and abdomen bluish white.

Female: Upperside black, the markings similar to those in the male, but orange-yellow and much broader; on the forewing the discal band complete, the inner subterminal band much broader and better defined.

Underside: the ground colour a paler brown than in the male, the markings as on the upperside but pinkish white, the dark brown blotches in the interspaces and the series of dark discal spots on the hindwing more prominent.

=== Athyma nefte asita ===
Myanmar, Tenasserim. Differs from A. n. nivifera as follows:

Male upperside. Forewing: discoidal streak more clearly divided, the preapical portion prominent; discal band broader, the anterior spot composing its posterior half not wider than the others, not outwardly conical; two conspicuous preapical orange-yellow spots. Hindwing: subbasal band slightly broader. Underside: ground colour a more ochraceous brown; forewing preapically orange-yellow.

Female upperside: the markings of a somewhat deeper orange-yellow; the discal band on fore and postdiscal band on hindwing distinctly broader; the inner subterminal narrow band on forewing ill-defined posteriorly; the preapical spots much smaller. Underside: ground colour much more ochraceous.

=== Athyma nefte inara ===
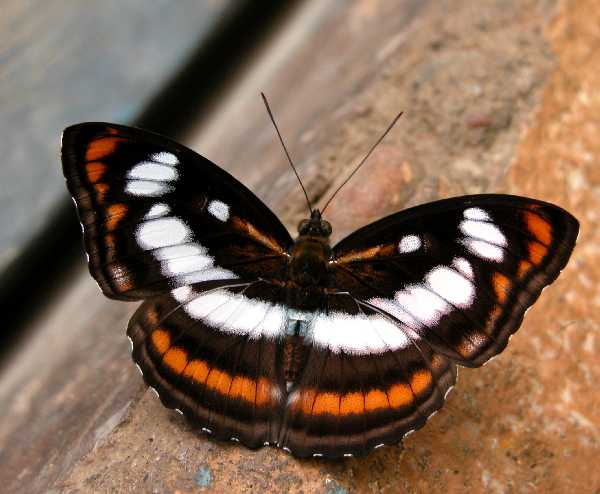
Male from Jairampur (Arunachal Pradesh)

Like Athyma nefte nivifera but differing in details. Is found in India. Male: upperside black with snow-white markings more or less edged with irrorations of blue scales. Forewing: discoidal streak from dusky white to dark ferruginous, with the exception of the preapical portion which is always prominently white; broad, straight and nearly complete white discal band removed from terminal margin and composed of three outwardly oblique quadrate spots in interspaces 1 a, 1 and 2, and three oblong spots inclined inwards in interspaces 4, 5 and 6, a small spot in interspace 3; beyond this an orange-yellow, macular, well-defined inner and a pale outer subterminal line divided by divided only by the black veins, the former terminating near apex in an obliquely placed mid-sized narrow white spot.

Hindwing: the discal band of the forewing continued as a subbasal transverse white band: a postdiscal, narrower, more or less macular band also white, and a very distinct pale, still narrower, subterminal band. The interspace between the postdiscal and the subterminal bands darker than the general ground colour of the wing, and the postdiscal band on the inner side margined with similarly coloured cone-shaped marks.

Underside ochraceous light brown, shaded with orange-yellow on apex of forewing and on the anterior portion of the postdiscal band on the hindwing; the markings similar on the upperside but somewhat diffuse, the discoidal streak and posterior half of inner sub-terminal band on forewing and the postdiscal band posteriorly on the hindwing suffused with very pale bluish pink; the interspaces of the ground colour smallish darker brown blotches, forming on the hindwing a conspicuous discal transverse series of spots in the interspaces; the dorsal margin of the hindwing broadly bluish white.

Antennae, head, thorax and abdomen above dark brownish black, the thorax and base of the abdomen respectively crossed by a bar of bluish white; beneath, the palpi, thorax and abdomen bluish white.

Female: Upperside black, the markings similar to those in the male, but pale orange-yellow and much broader; on the forewing the discal band complete and very broad, the inner subterminal band reduced to a tornal and two or three preapical spots.

Underside: the ground colour bright ochraceous yellow, the markings pinkish white, but in great part suffused with pale yellow; the dark brown blotches in the interspaces and the series of dark discal spots on the hindwing more prominent, and on the forewing large, and in strong contrast with the ground colour.

=== Athyma nefte seitzi ===
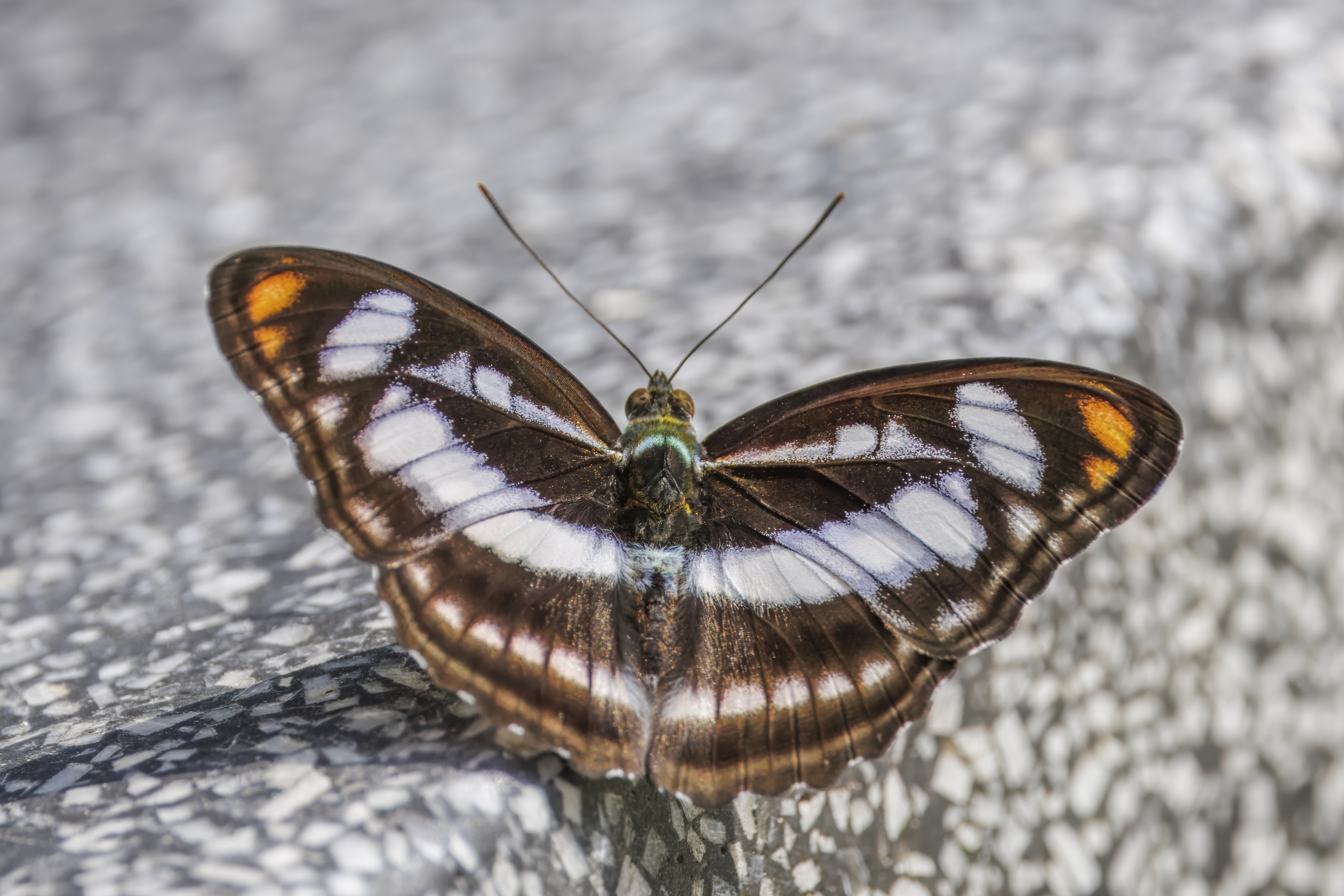
male A. n. seitzi, Hong Kong

== Ecology ==
Caterpillar cylindrical, with six rows of fine branched spines, the dorsal being lower than the lateral and those on the third and fourth segments lower than the rest, the second segment unarmed; the bases of the legs set with short simple spines. Colour pure green, with a large brown patch on the ninth segment. Spines brown and head dark brown, head covered with short simple brown spines and white tubercles. Feeds on Glochidion velutinum and G. zelanicum. Pupa like that of Athyma ranga, but of the curious processes on the back, the posterior one is much longer and more inclined forwards.

At least on Borneo but probably elsewhere too, adults - like other Athyma - generally do not visit carrion or old fruit to drink liquids.
