= Peravoor =

- Town
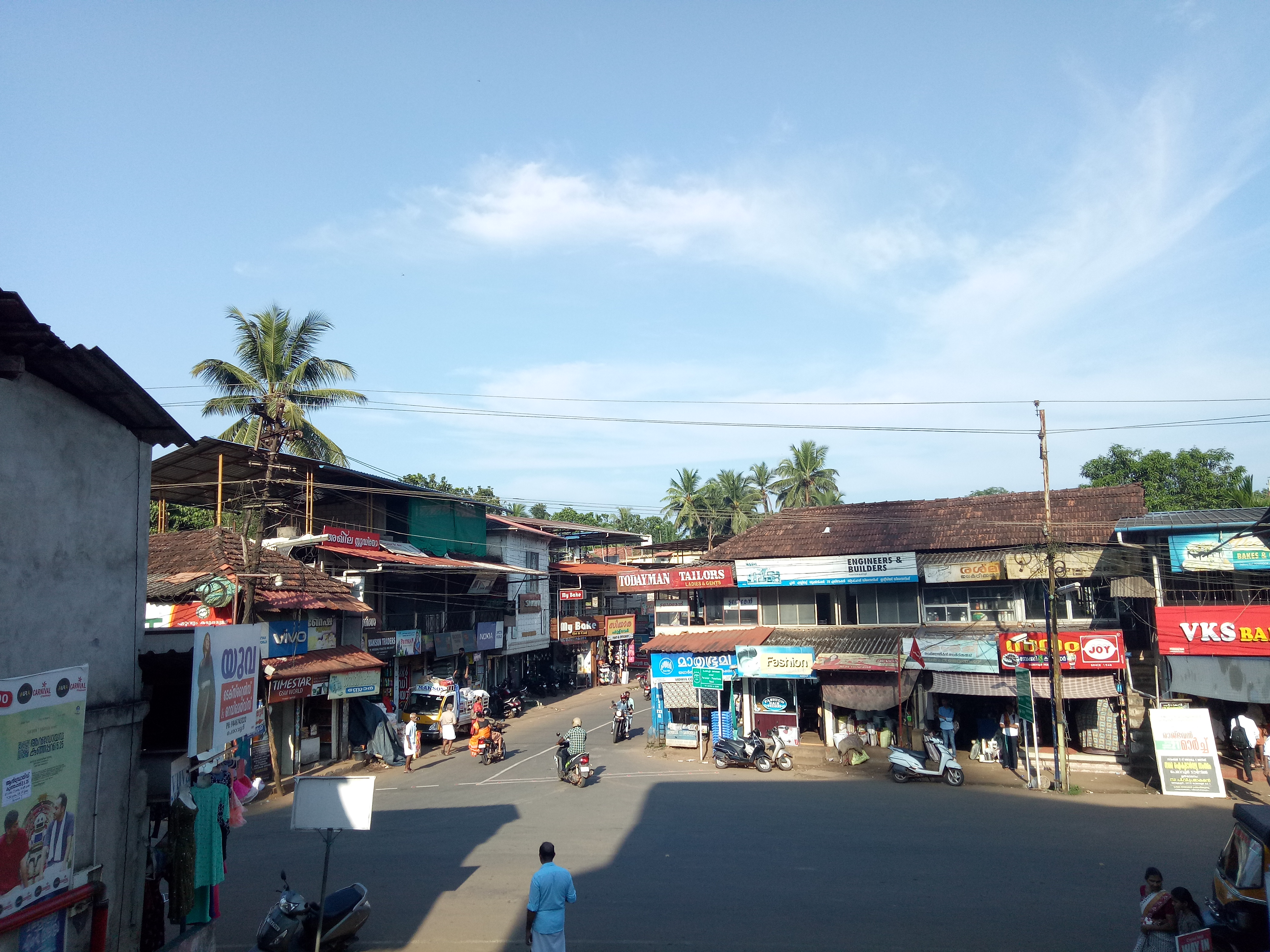
- Peravoor town

- Location in Kerala, India Peravoor (India)
- Coordinates: 11.8962°N 75.7342°E
- Country: India
- State: Kerala
- District: Kannur
- Taluk: Iritty

Government
  - Type: Panchayati raj (India)
  - Body: Peravoor Grama Panchayat
  - MLA: Sunny Joseph
  - Deputy Superintendent of Police: John A.V

Area
  - Total: 34.1 km^{2} (13.2 sq mi)
- Elevation: 85 m (279 ft)

Population (2011)
  - Total: 23,558
  - Density: 691/km^{2} (1,790/sq mi)

Languages
  - Official: Malayalam, English
- Time zone: UTC+5:30 (IST)
- PIN: 670673
- Telephone code: 0490
- ISO 3166 code: IN-KL
- Vehicle registration: KL-78
- Nearest city: Iritty (14 km)
- Assembly constituency: Peravoor
- Lok Sabha constituency: Kannur

Peravoor is a town and headquarters of Peravoor Grama Panchayat, Block Panchayat and an Assembly constituency in Kannur district of Kerala state in India.

== Location ==
Peravoor is located 55 km (34 mi) east of Kannur and 45 km (28 mi) north east of Thalassery and 14 km (8.7 mi) north of Iritty. Peravoor act as a junction connecting Iritty - Nedumpoil road and Iritty - Mananthavady road. Kerala Hill Highway passes through Manathana, about 3.5 km (2.2 mi) east of Peravoor.

== Introduction ==
The history of Peravoor is related to Pazhassi Raja, a warrior prince and de facto head of the kingdom of Kottayam and one of the earliest freedom fighters of India. There are many remnants of Pazhassi Raja's hiding places in and around of Peravoor.

St. Joseph's Forane Church in Peravoor is the first Syro-Malabar Catholic Church in Malabar, formed under the Thalassery Archdiocese. Peravoor is near the Kottiyoor Shiva temple and Sree Mridanga Saileswari Kshethram.

It is the first place that the Syro-Malabar Christian (Nazrani / Saint Thomas Christians) migrants from Northern Travancore region occupied during the Malabar migration. This community contributed to the fields of education, sports, culture and many more basic developments of Peravoor and its vicinity.

Peravoor holds the Guinness World Record for the tallest Christmas star in the World.

Government and private institutions include hospitals, schools, clubs, churches, a police station, a fire station, theatres, banks, a treasury, and shopping malls.

== Demographics ==
As of 2011 census, Peravoor Grama Panchayat had a total population of 23,558 which constituted 11,319 males and 12,239 females. There were 5,584 families residing in the rural panchayat limits. The sex ratio of Peravoor was 1081, lower than the state average of 1084. Population of children in the age group 0-6 was 2,310 (9.8%) where 1,159 were males and 1,151 were females. Peravoor Panchayat had an overall literacy of 94% where male literacy was 96.4% and female literacy was 91.9%. Peravoor Panchayat consists of two revenue villages, Manathana and Vellarvelly.

== Administration ==
Peravoor Grama Panchayat comprises 17 wards. The current panchayat is ruled by LDF party.

Peravoor Block Panchayat is divided into 14 wards with 8 Grama Panchayats included in it. Panchayats like Kottiyoor, Kelakam, Kanichar, Muzhakunnu, Aralam, Ayyankunnu, Koloyad and Peravoor are part of the block. Peravoor block is ruled by UDF party.

Peravoor is one among the assembly constituencies in Kerala. Peravoor Assembly constituency is politically a part of Kannur Lok Sabha constituency. The current MLA is Sunny Joseph under UDF party.

== Politics ==
Peravoor Assembly constituency is a part of Kannur Lok Sabha constituency. The current MLA of Peravoor is Adv. Sunny Joseph from INC who won in 2021 Kerala Legislative Assembly election with a vote share of 46.93%.

== Law and order ==
Peravoor is one of the four subdivisions in Kannur rural police district. Peravoor sub division was established on 18 February 2021 by bifurcating Iritty subdivision. The subdivision has jurisdiction over four police stations, viz Peravoor, Muzhakkunnu, Maloor and Kelakam, with an area of 379 km^{2}, comprising 11 villages.

== Transportation ==
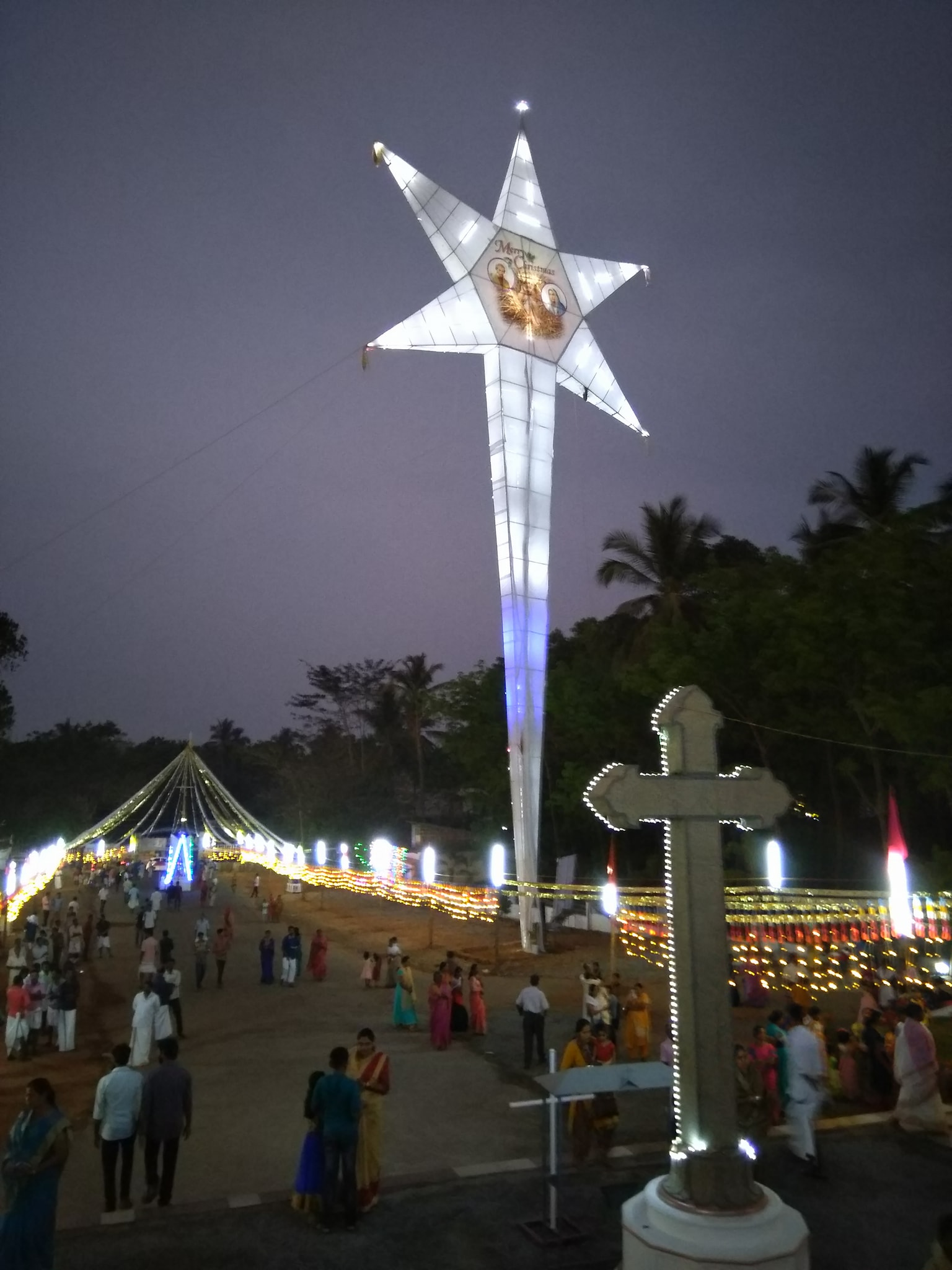
Tallest Christmas star

The national highway passes through Kannur town. Mangalore and Mumbai can be accessed on the northern side and Cochin and Thiruvananthapuram can be accessed on the southern side. The road to the east of Iritty connects to Mysore and Bangalore. The nearest railway station is Thalassery on Shoranur-Mangalore Section of southern railway. Kannur International Airport is just 27 km away from Peravoor. There are airports at Mangalore and Calicut.

Kerala Hill Highway (SH 59) passes through Peravoor town which connects eastern parts of Kannur district with Kozhikode and Wayanad districts. Wayanad is just 30 km away from Peravoor. Wayanad can be accessed through Peravoor-Nedumpoil-Mananthavadi road (Baveli Road) or Peravoor-Kottiyoor-Mananthavady road. There are several bypass roads available such as the Peravoor -Poolakutty -Mananthvady road which was used by Pazhassi Raja, British people and Tippu Sultan.

Distances to some of the important places:

- Bangalore / Bengaluru - 290 km
- Mysore - 150 km
- Kochi - 293 km
- Kozhikode - 103 km
- Mangalore - 180 km

== Educational institutions ==
- Malabar B.Ed. Training College, Peravoor
- De-Paul Arts and Science College, Edathotty
- Government ITI, Peravoor
- St. Joseph's HS, Peravoor
- Government HSS, Manathana

== Hospitals ==
- Resmi Hospital
- Archana Hospital
- Syrus Hospital
- Peravoor Taluk Hospital
- Dr. V Bhaskaran Memorial Peravoor Nursing Home
- many homeopathic, Ayurvedic and dental hospitals and clinics

== Tourism ==
Peravoor and the surrounding areas have many tourist attractions.

- Aralam Wildlife Sanctuary
- Puralimala (Mayiladumpara)
- Pazhassi Dam and garden
- Kanjirakkolly waterfalls
- Perumparamba Mahatma Gandhi Park
- Coorg valleys
- Palchuram
- Krishnagiri river and Barapole hydroelectric project
- Central State farm at Aralam
- Steel girder bridge at Iritty, built by British
- Madikeri
- Wayanad
- Wayand Ghat Roads
- Elapeedika

== Notable people ==
- Jimmy George, Indian national volleyball player
- John Panamthottathil, Syro Malabar Church Bishop
