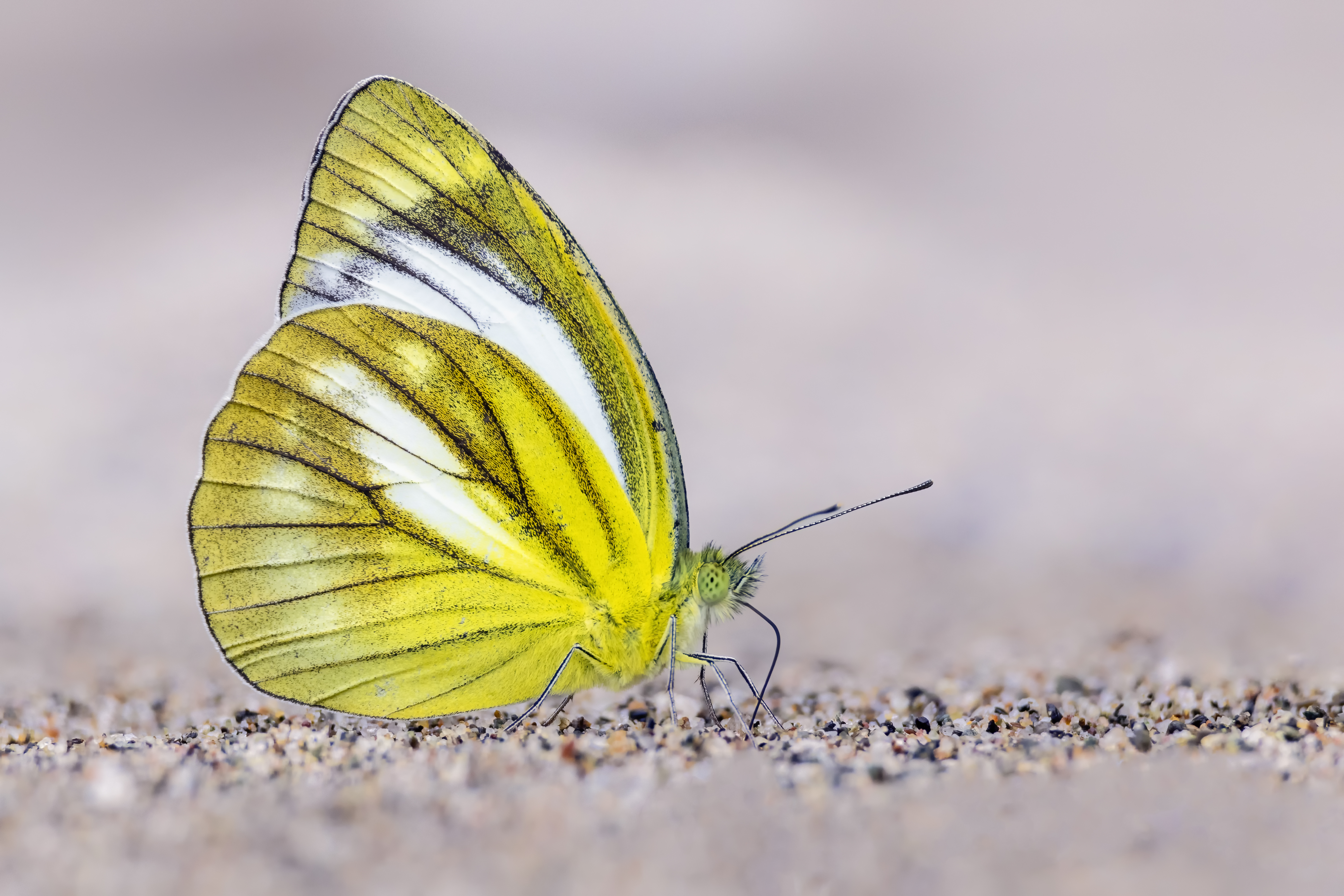

Scientific classification
- Kingdom: Animalia
- Phylum: Arthropoda
- Class: Insecta
- Order: Lepidoptera
- Family: Pieridae
- Genus: Cepora
- Species: C. nadina

Binomial name
- Cepora nadina (H. Lucas, 1852)

Synonyms
- Pieris nadina H. Lucas, 1852; Huphina nadina; Huphina liquida C. Swinhoe, 1890; Pieris amba Wallace, 1867; Appias amboides Moore, 1884; Pieris nama Moore, [1858]; Appias andersoni Distant, 1885; Huphina hainanensis Fruhstorfer, 1913

= Cepora nadina =

Lesser gull

Species of butterfly

Cepora nadina, the lesser gull, is a small to medium-sized butterfly of the family Pieridae, that is, the yellows and whites. The species was first described by Hippolyte Lucas in 1852. It is native to Sri Lanka, India, Myanmar, Hainan, and southeast Asia.

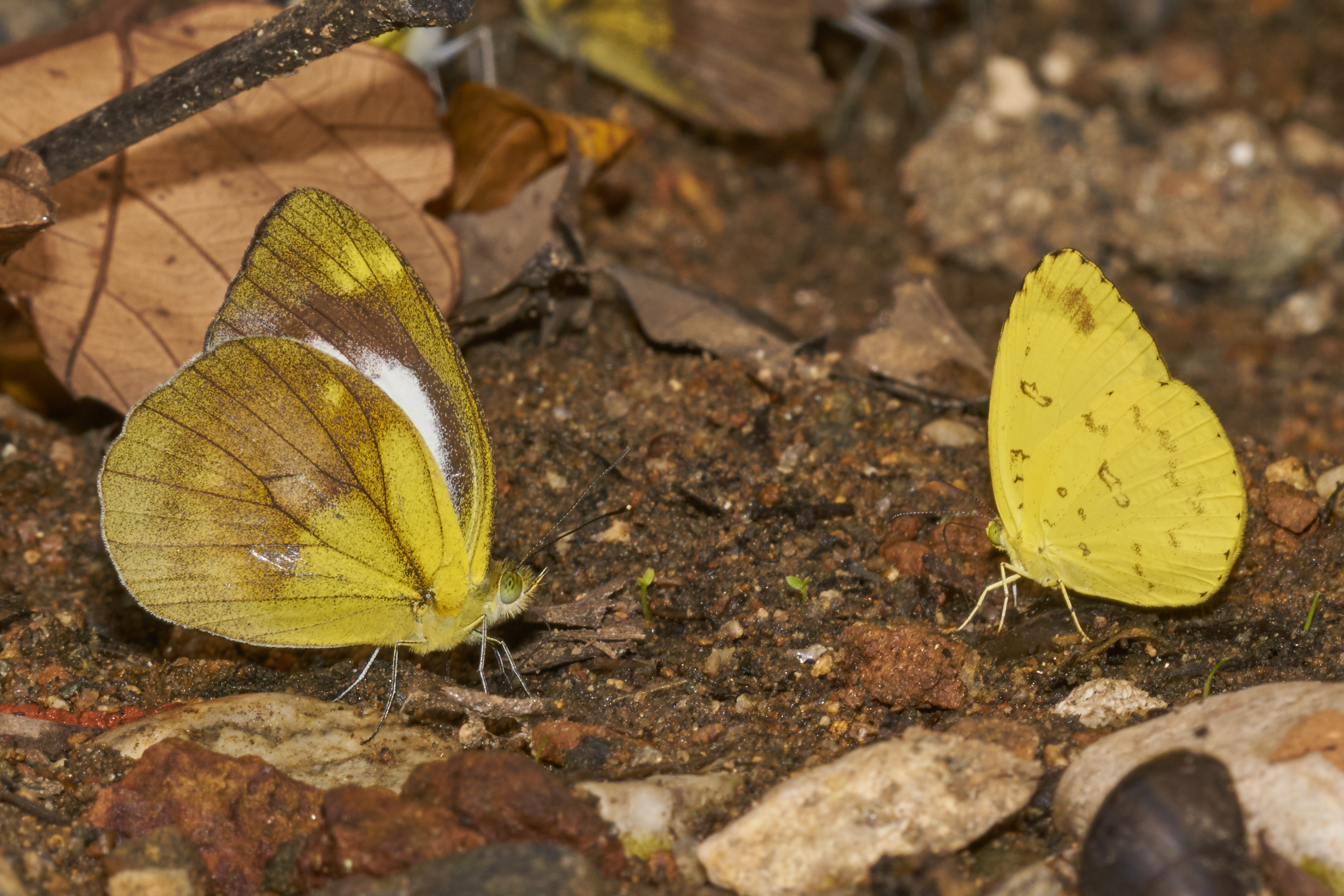
Cepora nadina and Eurema blanda mud-puddling from the dry stream bed at Aralam Wildlife Sanctuary, Kerala, India.

== Description ==
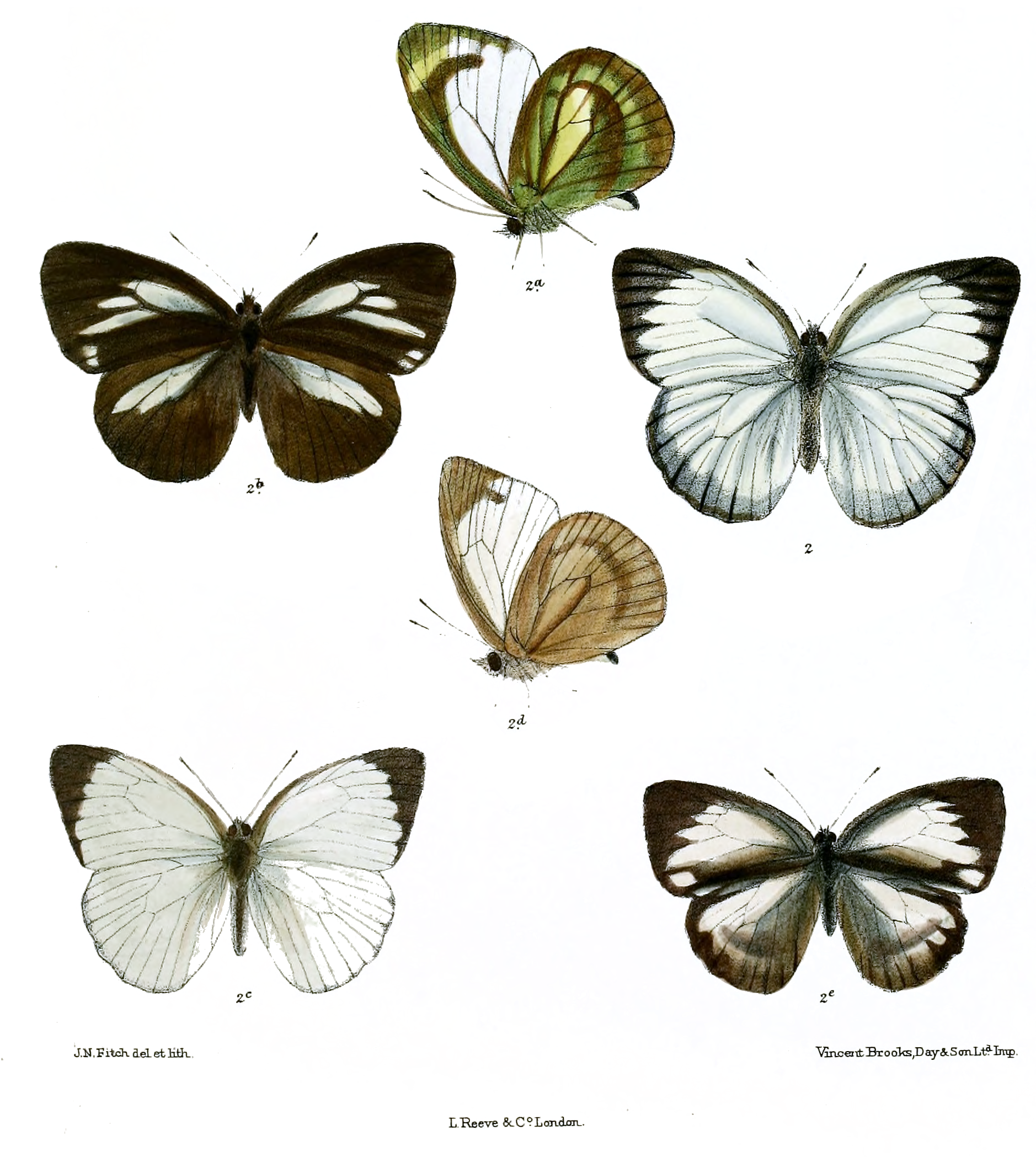
Wet- and dry-season forms

=== Wet-season brood ===
Male has the upperside ground colour white. Forewing has the basal half of costal margin suffused with greenish yellow and irrorated (sprinkled) sparsely with black scales; apex from the middle of the costa and termen black, the inner margin of the black arched and acutely produced inwards along the veins, the black on the termen narrowed posteriorly and in interspaces 1a and 1 reduced to a mere thread. Hindwing: terminal margin with a broad dark band, due to the markings of the underside that show through by transparency, the darkness accentuated by a slight irroration of black scales; apices of some of the anterior veins black, in some specimens these are dilated and form a narrow anterior black border. Underside: white. Forewing: costal margin and apex very broadly suffused with greenish yellow and irrorated more or less densely with black scales, these latter form also diffuse subterminal patches on the white ground colour in interspaces 3 and 4; a preapical oblique short band bright yellow, its margins ill-defined; in interspaces 1 to 3 the black terminal markings on the upperside show through as a greyish-blue shade. Hindwing: suffused with greenish yellow that leaves only a broad streak in the cell (continued beyond in interspaces 4 and 5) of the white ground colour apparent; the whole surface of the wing more or less densely irrorated with black scales, these have a tendency to form a broad lower obscure discal dark patch and a broad terminal margin, the space between these two bright yellow; a spot of bright yellow also in inter-space 6. Antennae black; the head and thorax anteriorly with long greenish hairs, thorax posteriorly with greyish-blue pile: abdomen black with short white hair-like scales; beneath: the palpi with blackish hairs, the thorax yellow, abdomen white. Female upperside, forewing: dark brownish black; an oval, elongate, broad streak in cell, continued beyond into the base of interspace 4, broad streaks outwardly ill-defined from bases of interspaces 2 and 3, a large subterminal spot in interspace 1 and a pretornal short streak along the dorsal margin, white. The amount of white marking is variable in some specimens, nearly the whole of the cell and the greater portion of the basal area of interspace 1 are sometimes also white. Hindwing: dark brownish black fading to dusky brownish white posteriorly; cell, basal half of interspace 4 and an elongate, broad, outwardly pointed streak in interspace 5 white. Underside: similar to that of the male, but the white area on the forewing more restricted and of a purplish tint, the dusky-black shading on the disc that borders the green on the apical area broader, and the greater portion of interspaces 1a and 1 also shaded with dusky purplish black. Hindwing: darker than in the male, the veins more prominently bordered with black scaling, the posterior, discal, ill-defined, dark band or patch broader and more conspicuous. Antenna, head, thorax and abdomen purplish brown, the thorax with some long greyish hairs; beneath: the palpi and thorax greenish yellow, abdomen whitish.

=== Dry-season brood ===
Male is similar to the wet-season brood, but on the upperside, the black on the apex and termen of the forewing not nearly so broad, on the latter often not reaching vein 1; on the hindwing the black is reduced to a sparse powdering of black scales along the termen.

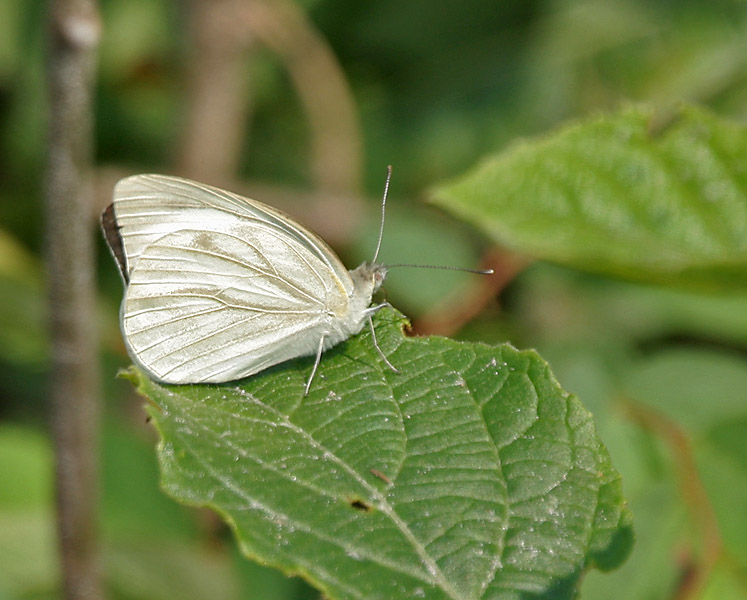
Dry-season brood at Jayanti, Duars, West Bengal

Underside: similar to that of the wet-season brood but the greenish-yellow suffusion replaced entirely by ochraceous brown; on the hindwing the white markings of the wet-season form replaced by a paler ochraceous shade than on the rest of the wing; the veins all broadly bordered with irrorated black scaling; the discal obscure transverse band more or less as in specimens of the wet-season brood, but often obsolescent. Antennae black, head and thorax anteriorly ochraceous brown, thorax medially and posteriorly with long bluish-grey pile, abdomen black with short white hair-like scaling; beneath: the palpi ochraceous with some black hairs, thorax ochraceous brown, abdomen white.

Female very similar to those of the wet-season female, but the blackish-brown colouring on the upperside paler and duller in tint. Underside: differs in the yellowish-green suffusion on both forewings and hindwings, which is replaced by ochraceous brown. Antennae, head, thorax and abdomen as in the male.

Wingspan of 58–74 mm.

== Distribution ==
North-eastern India: Sikkim; Bhutan; Assam: Sylhet; the Khasi Hills; Manipur: Upper and Lower Burma; the Shan States; Tenasserim. Subspecies C. n. remba is found in Sri Lanka and southern India while C. n. andamana is found in the Andaman Islands.

== Subspecies ==
Subspecies are:

- C. n. nadina (Sikkim to Indo-China, Thailand, southern Yunnan)
- C. n. remba Moore, 1857 (southern India)
- C. n. cingala Moore, 1905 (Sri Lanka)
- C. n. andamana C. Swinhoe, 1889 (Andamans)
- C. n. andersoni (Distant, 1885) (Peninsular Malaya)
- C. n. fawcetti (Butler, 1899) (Sumatra)
- C. n. eunama (Fruhstorfer, 1908) (Taiwan)
- C. n. hainanensis (Fruhstorfer, 1913) (Hainan)
