= Poolakutty =

- Town
Poolakutty
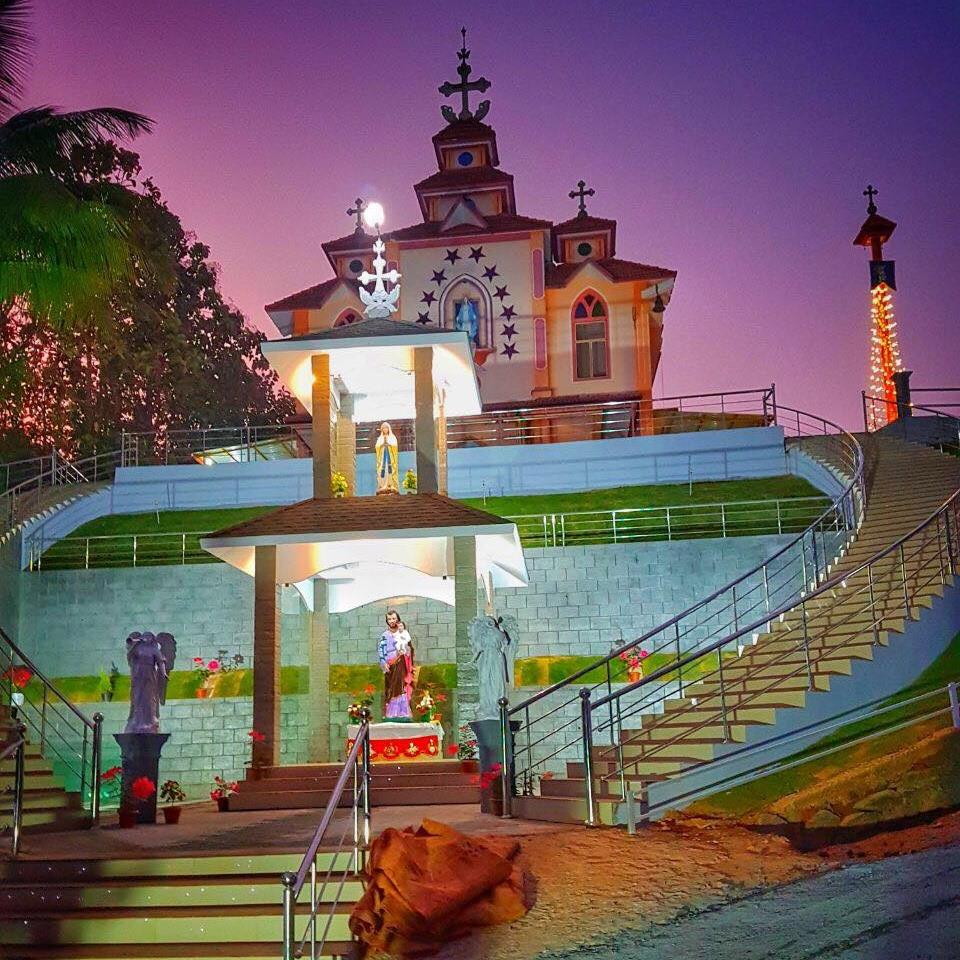
- Interactive map of Poolakutty
Grotto-St:Marys Church
- Interactive map of Poolakutty
- Coordinates: 11°51′32.2″N 75°46′06.9″E
- Country: India
- State: Kerala
- District: Kannur
- PIN: 670673

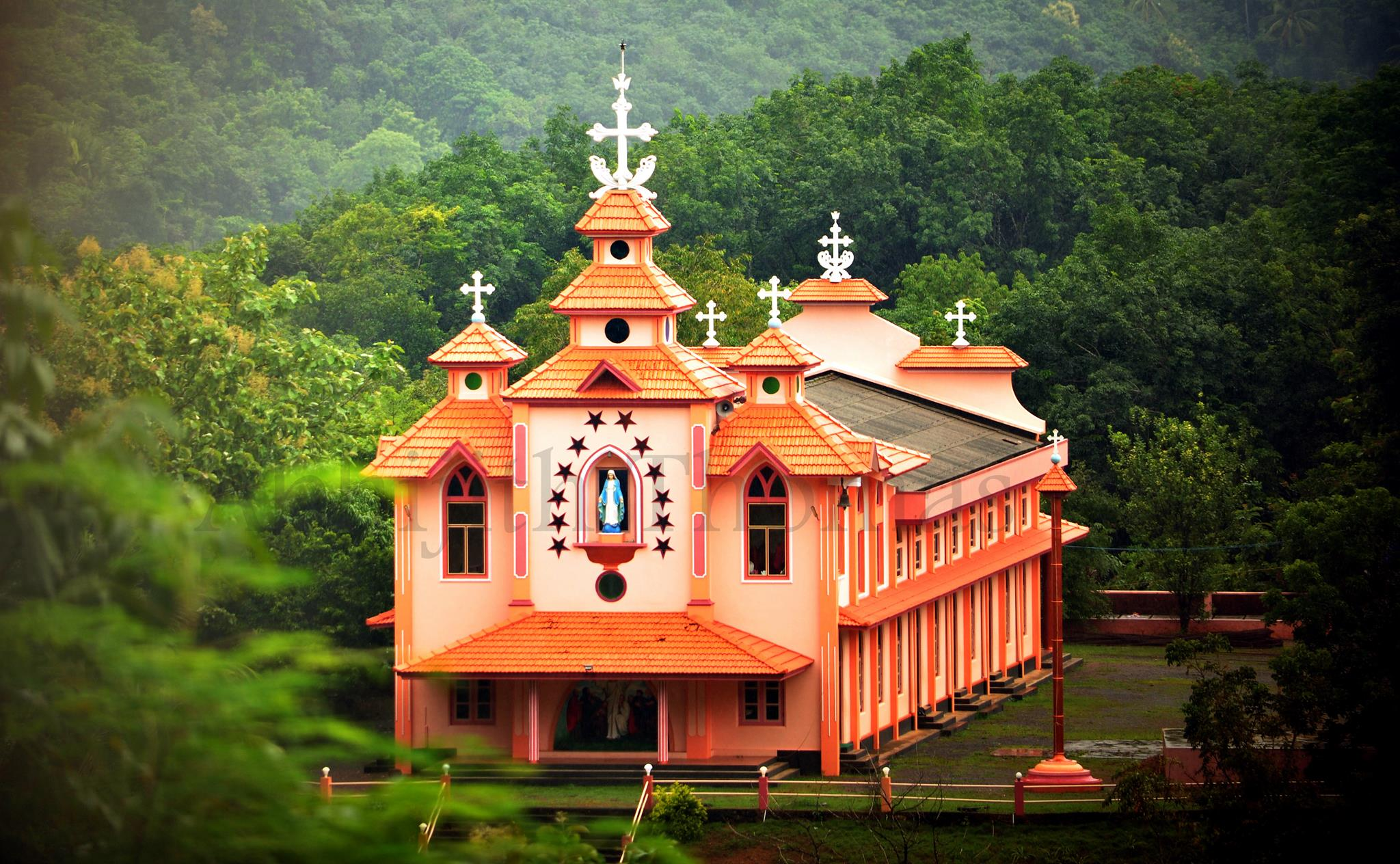
St:Marys Church-Poolakutty

Poolakutty is a town near Peravoor in Kannur District of Kerala state in India.

Peravoor is just 5 km away from Poolakutty. Many roads connect with Peravoor. The four roads meeting at the city's central junction proceed to Wayanad, Peravoor / Thalassery, Kolakkad / Kelakam / Kottiyoor and Vellara, respectively.

Poolakutty-Wayand road was being used by Pazhassi Raja, Tippu Sulthan and British rulers to connect with Thalassery and Wayand.

== Culture ==
Most of the people are Syrian Christians migrated during the Malabar Migration. There are also many Hindus.

Rubber plantations are the major agriculture in this area. Other varieties of agriculture include Coconut tree plantation, Cashew plantation, black pepper plantation, and coffee plantation.

== Institutions ==
- Vijaya Bank, Bank of India, Poolakutty Co-Operative Bank
- Milma Office
- Post Office
- BSNL Telephone Exchange
- Government Homeopathic Hospital
- Gov veterinary clinic
- Gov Health Office
- Gov Nursery
- Aided School
- Saint Mary's Catholic Church
- St. Mary's Auditorium
- Navabodhi Library
- Navatharangini Music Club
- ASMI Convent
- Lumia Media Networks

== Places nearby ==
- Thalassery-41 km
- Kannur-54 km
- Wayand District-10 km
- Iritty-20 km
- Peravoor-7 km
- Elapeedika-6 km
- Kannur International Airport-32 km
- Coorg-60 km
