= Pazhassi Dam =

Pazhassi Dam Kuyilur Barrage
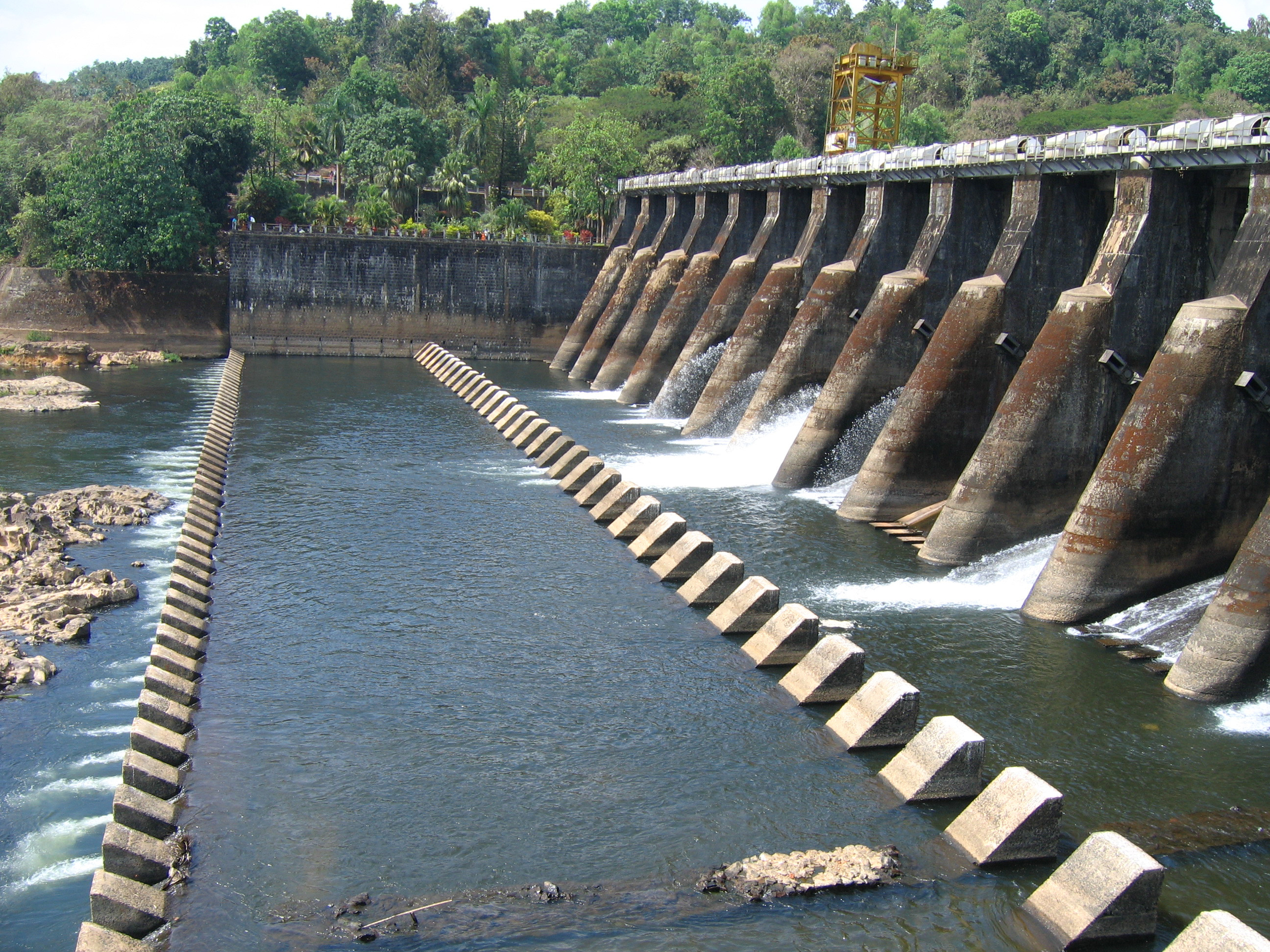

- Location within India Location within Kerala
- Location: Kannur District, Kerala, India
- Coordinates: 11°58′42″N 75°36′43″E
- Purpose: Irrigation and drinking water supply
- Status: Operational
- Opening date: 1979

Dam and spillways
- Height: 18.99 metres (62.3 ft)
- Length: 245 metres (804 ft)
- Spillways: 16
- Spillway type: Radial gates
- Spillway capacity: 3,510 cubic metres (124,000 cu ft) per second

Reservoir
- Total capacity: 97,500,000 m^{3} (79,045 acre⋅ft)
- Active capacity: 97,500,000 m^{3} (79,045 acre⋅ft)
- Surface area: 6.5 km^{2} (3 mi^{2})
- Normal elevation: 26.52 metres (87.0 ft)

The Pazhassi Dam also called Kuyilur Barrage is a stone masonry diversion structure in Kannur district, Kerala, India. It is named after king Pazhassi Raja, a patriot who died a heroic death in the war. The dam is constructed across the west flowing Bavali river near Veliyambra. It was commissioned by Prime Minister Morarji Desai in 1979. It mainly functions as an irrigation dam, serving a command area of 11,525 hectares (28,480 acres) in Iritty taluk of the Kannur District. The water from this dam also meets the drinking water requirement of Kannur district. The dam site and the reservoir are known for their scenery.

== Topography ==
The dam is built at Kuyiloor across the Bavali River, in the basin of the West flowing rivers from Tadri to Kanyakumari. It rises in the Coorg (in Karnataka) at 2,500 feet (760 m) and drains a catchment area of 1,028 square kilometres (397 sq mi). The mean annual rainfall in the catchment is 3,622 millimetres (142.6 in). The nearest towns to the dam site are Mattanur and Iritty.

== Features ==
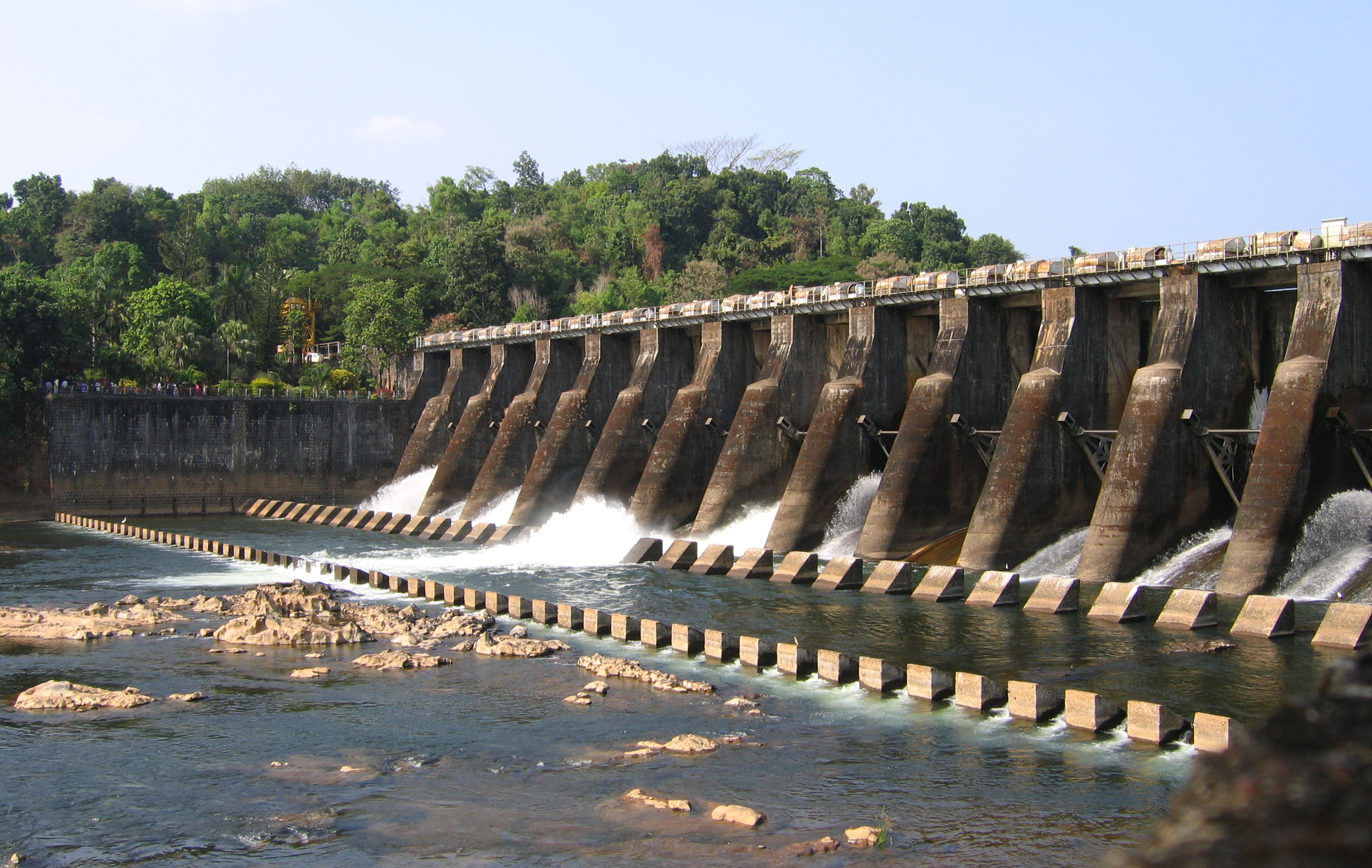
Pazhassi Dam and its 16 gates in operation

The diversion dam or barrage, built with stone masonry to function as a major irrigation project, is 18.99 metres (62.3 ft) in height and has a length of 245 metres (804 ft). At the Full Reservoir Level of 26.52 metres (87.0 ft), with a water spread area of 650 hectares (1,600 acres), the dam has a gross storage capacity of 97,500,000 m^{3} (79,045 acre⋅ft). The spillway designed to rout a design flood discharge of 3,510 cubic metres (124,000 cu ft) per second is fitted with 16 radial gates over a length of 138 metres (453 ft).

While the dam was completed in 1978, its irrigation component was completed in 1979. The water stored in the reservoir is diverted for irrigation through a control structure on the left bank of the barrage to the main canal of 46.26 kilometres (28.74 mi) length, designed to carry a discharge of 20 cubic metres (710 cu ft) per second. The gross command area under the canal system is 23,650 hectares (58,400 acres) with a net command area of 11,525 hectares (28,480 acres) (as against the earlier planned figure of 16,110 hectares (39,800 acres)) to mainly raise three crops of paddy every year in the Iritty and Taliparamba taluks of Kannur district; other crops grown in the command are coconut, arecanut, cashew nut, tapioca, pepper, ginger, turmeric and vegetables. The network of canals includes six branch canals of 76.35 kilometres (47.44 mi) total length and 32 distributaries of 136.4 kilometres (84.8 mi) total length. The entire command is covered under the Command Area Development Programme (CADP) of the Ministry of Water Resources, Government of India and is being monitored since 2003.

== Failure of gates ==
On 7 August 2012, some of the gates of the barrage failed to open, causing the flood waters to overflow the barrage for 20 hours. There was no damage to life or the dam structure, but minor property and crop loss occurred. The gates were repaired at a cost of Rs 70 million.

== Pazhassi Dam Gardens ==
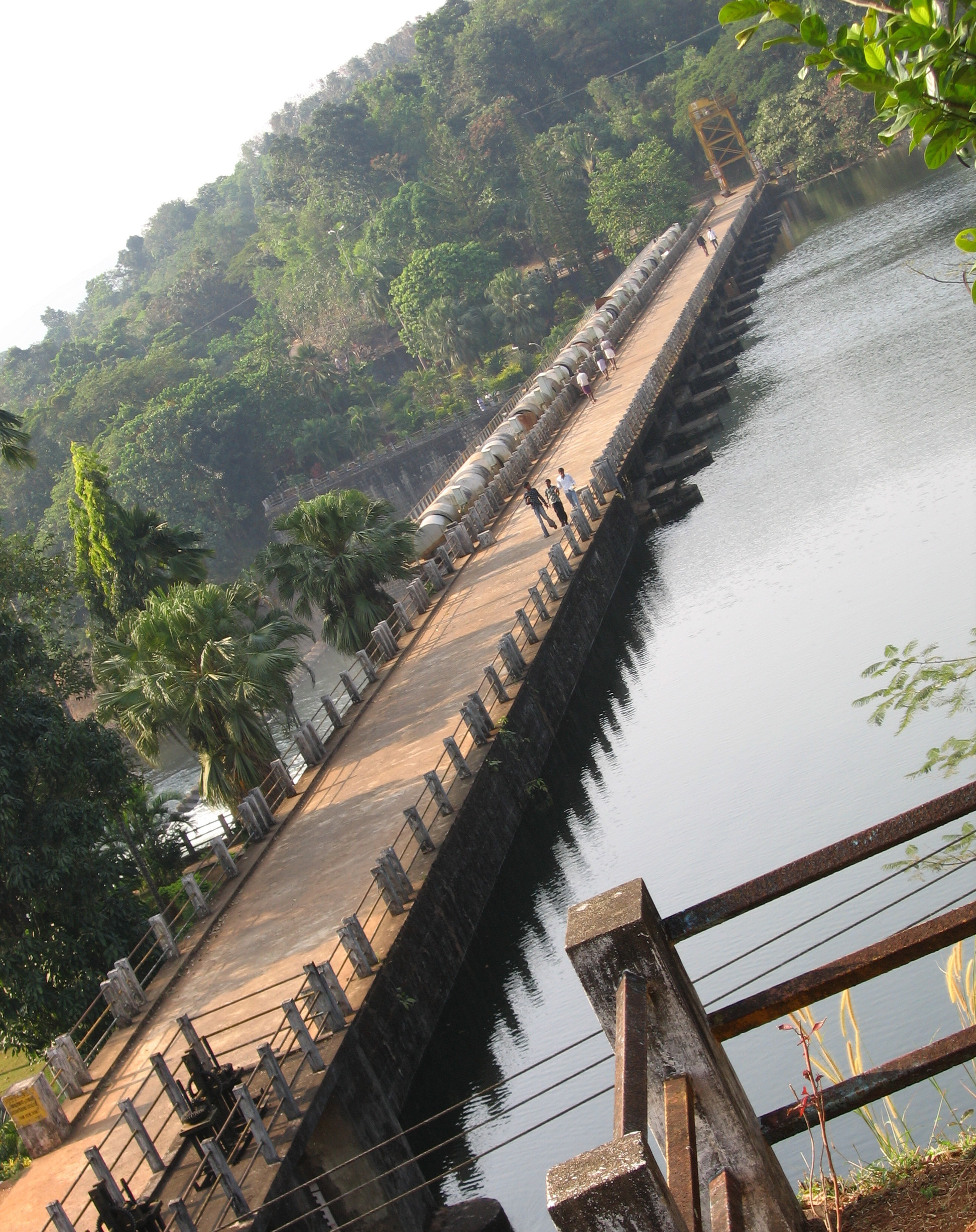

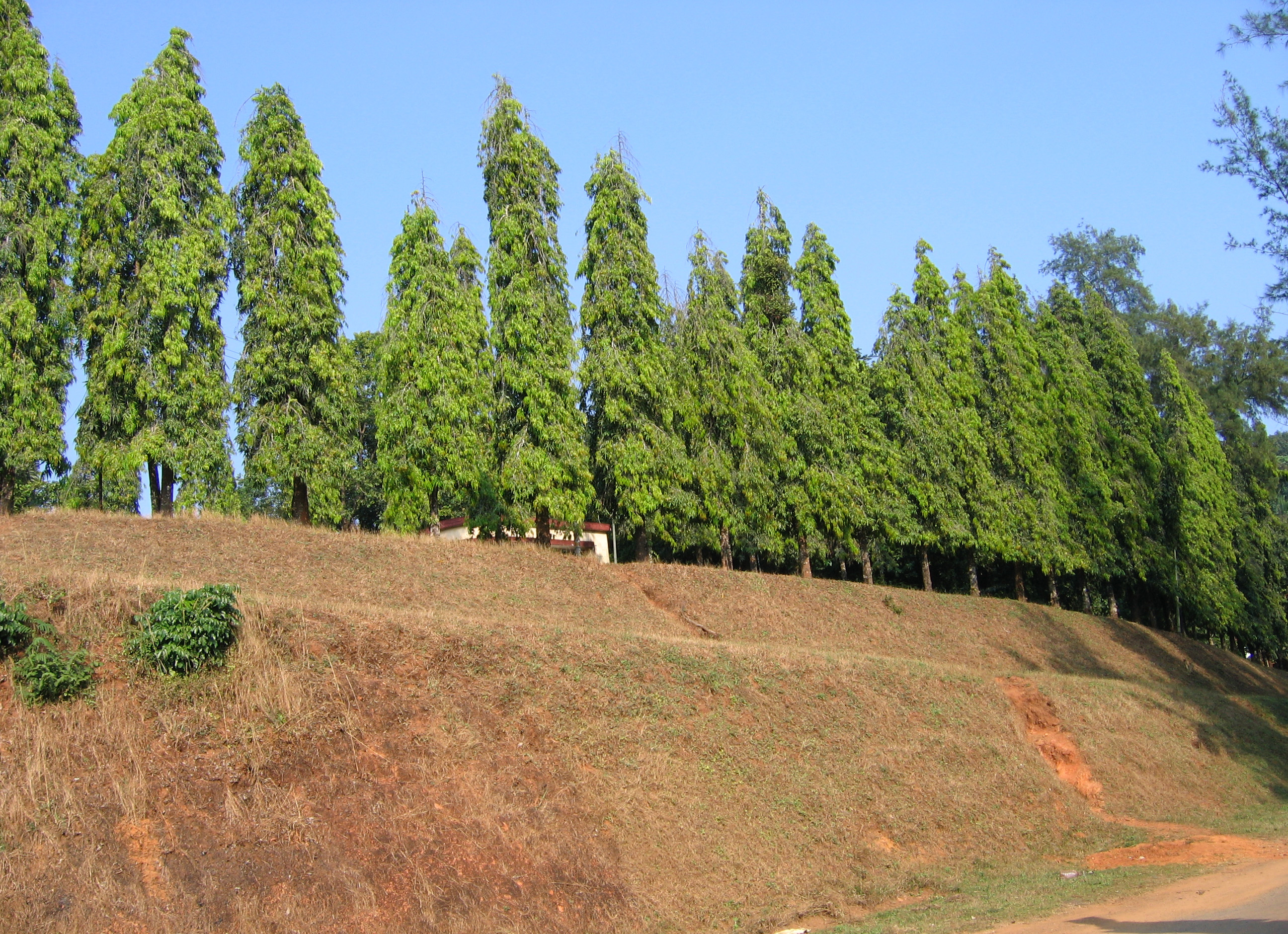

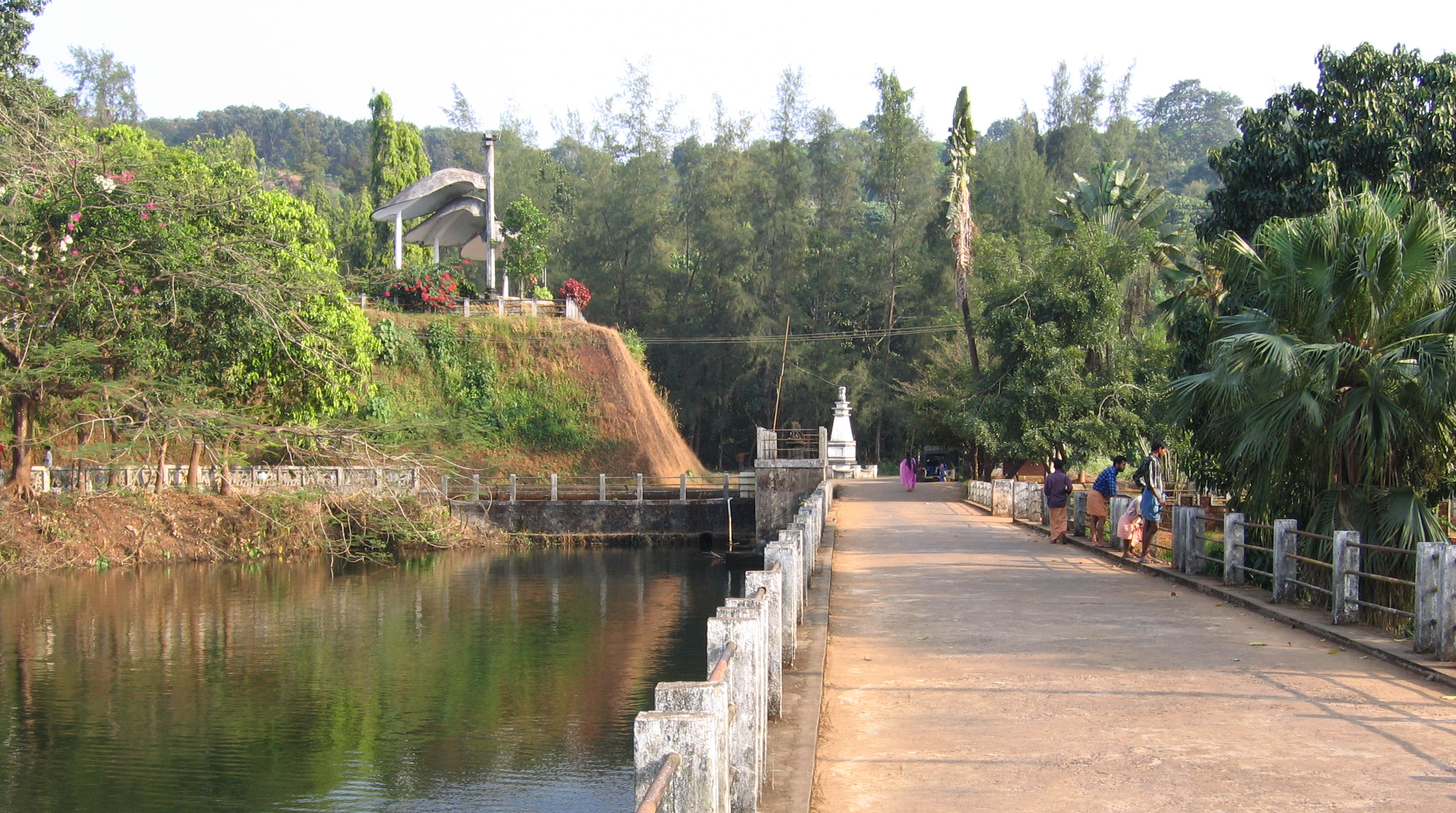

== See also ==
- List of dams and reservoirs in India
- List of dams and reservoirs in Kerala
