= Aralam Butterfly Sanctuary =

Nature reserve in Kerala, India

- IUCN category IV (habitat/species management area)
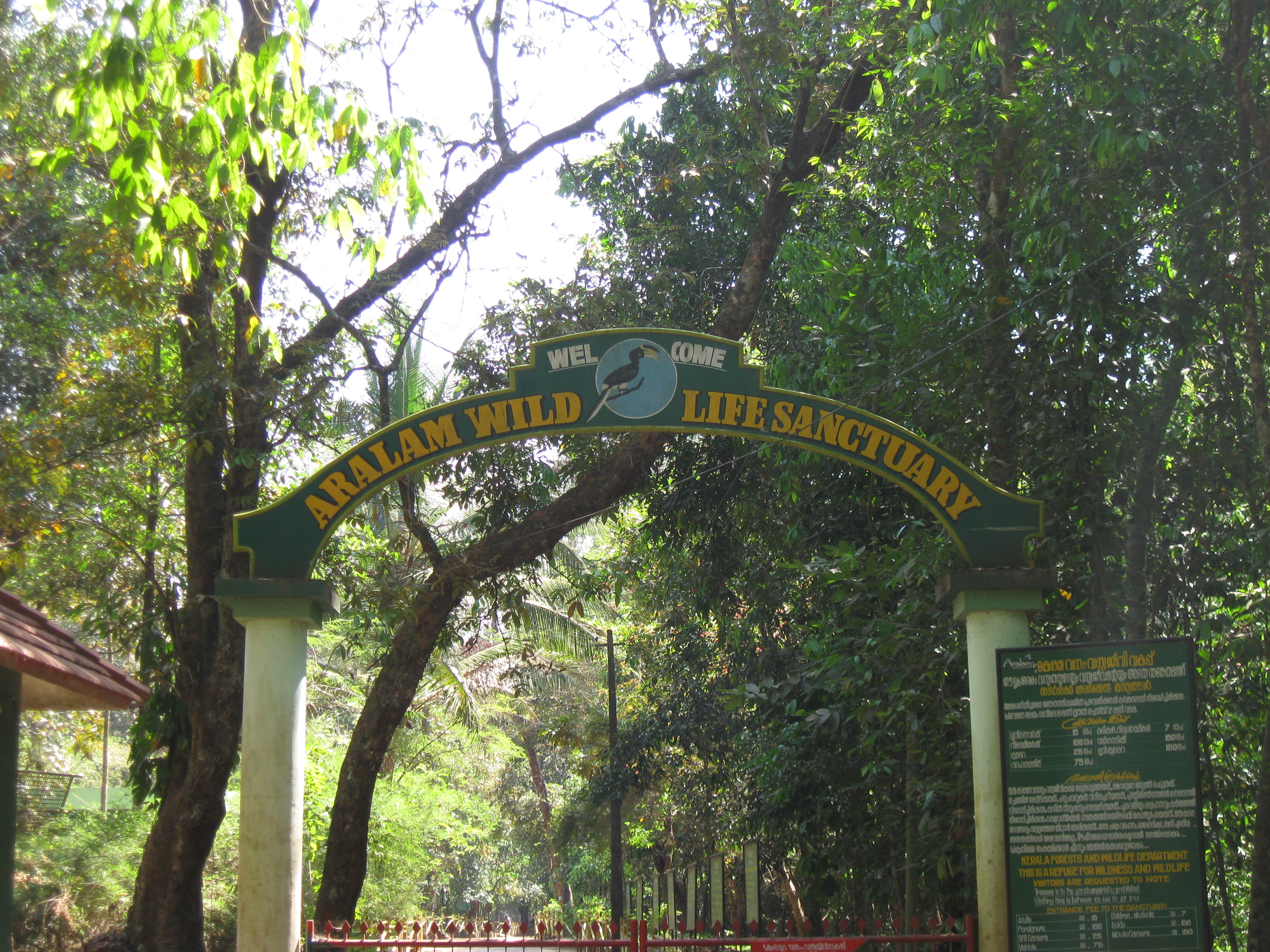
- Entrance of Butterfly

- Location within Kerala Location within India
- Interactive map of Aralam Butterfly Sanctuary
- Location: Kerala, southwest India
- Coordinates: 11.87878°N 75.88864°E
- Area: 55 km^{2} (21 sq mi)
- Established: 1984
- Website: www.aralam.org

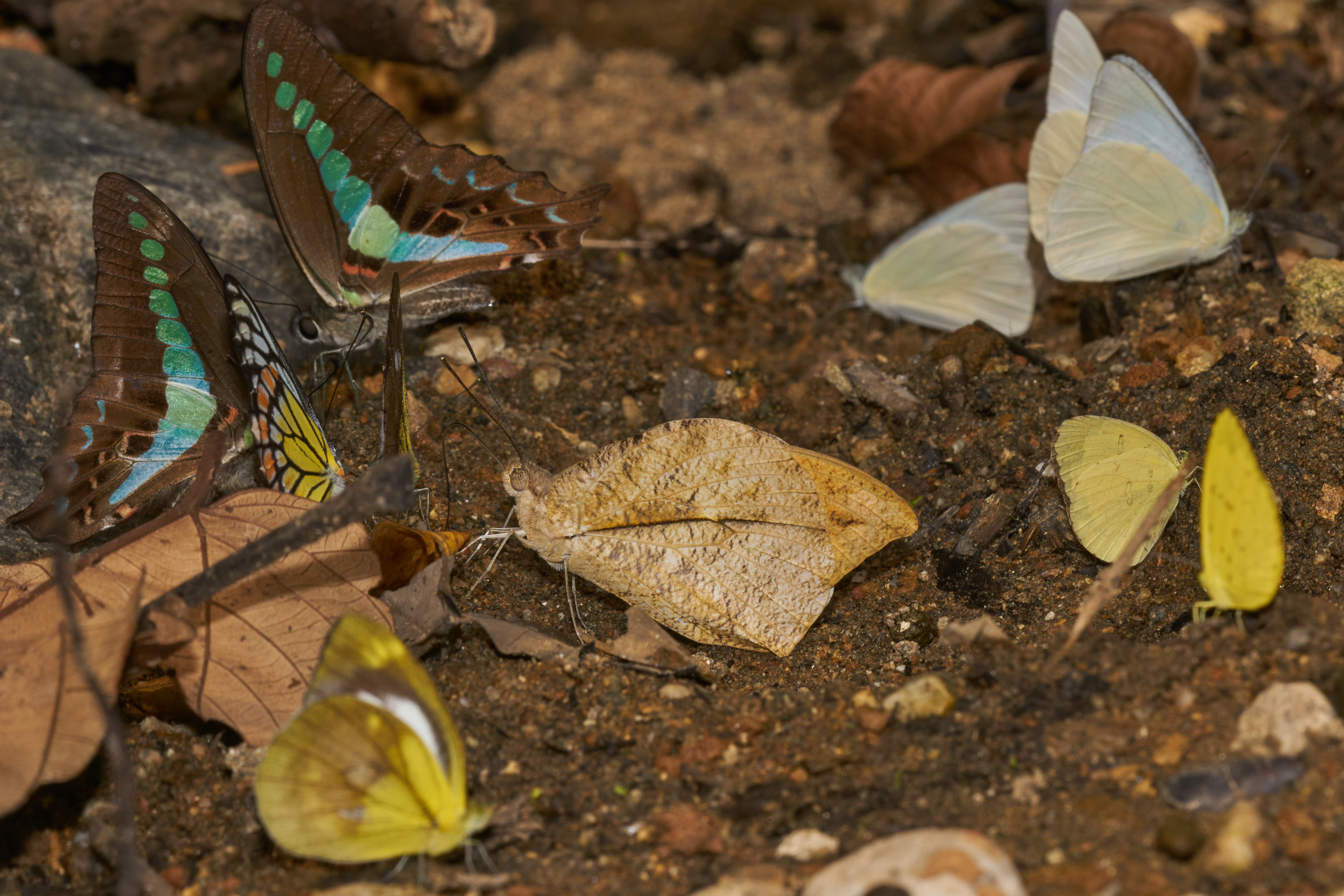
Mud-puddling several butterflies (Hebomoia glaucippe, Graphium teredon, Prioneris sita, Cepora nadina, Appias albina and Eurema hecabe) from the dry stream bed at Aralam Wildlife Sanctuary.

Aralam Butterfly Sanctuary is the northernmost wildlife sanctuary of Kerala, southwest India. It is 55 km^{2} (21 sq mi) in area and located on the western slope of the Western Ghats. It was established in 1984 with its headquarters near Iritty with the name Aralam Wildlife Sanctuary. In July 2025, it was renamed to Aralam Butterfly Sanctuary. Aralam Butterfly Sanctuary is situated in the southeast part of Kannur District. It is home to over 266 species of Butterflies, including a number of endangered species.

== Description ==
It lies between 11° 54′ and 11° 59′ north latitude and 75° 47′ and 75° 57′ east longitude.

The sanctuary area falls in Aralam, Kelakam and Kottiyoor revenue villages and is located in the northwest slopes of Western Ghats contiguous with the forests of Kodagu (Coorg) district of Karnataka state.

The PA (protected area) consists of Aralam Range, the only range of Aralam wildlife division, which is part of Northern Wildlife Circle (Northern Region) Palakkad. The extent of the sanctuary is 55 square kilometres (21 sq mi). The sanctuary was constituted in 1984 as per GO (P) 300/84/AD dated 15 October 1984.

It was formed by carving out areas from the Odanthode Malavaram of Thalassery special division which was an erstwhile private forest, subsequently taken over by Govt. as per the provisions of the Kerala Private Forests (vesting and assignment) Act 1971 and from the Kottiyoor RF of Wayanad Forest Division.

The vested forest portion of the sanctuary is 32.64 square kilometres (12.60 sq mi) and the 22.36 km2 is part of Kottiyoor RF (Reserved Forest).

Till 30.6.98 this sanctuary was a range in Wayanad Wildlife Division. It started functioning as an independent wildlife division since 1.7.98 as per GO (MS) 36/98 dated 27.5.98.

In the First Management Plan the entire area was divided into two zones viz: the Core Zone and the Buffer Zone. Climatic factors include rainfall, temperature, humidity, frost and so on.

- Average rainfall: 4000 mm
- Temperature: 11.0°C to 40.0°C
- Humidity: 60 to 100 %
- Wind: Regular wind during Southwest monsoon
- Water source: Aralam River, Cheenkannipuzha River.

== Conditions ==
=== Rainfall ===
Rainfall data available in the Central State Farm, Aralam, which is just adjoining to the sanctuary area has been analysed. The major source of moisture in the tract is in the form of rainfall. The total annual rainfall seldom falls below 4000 mm. The maximum annual value for the nine years data available is 5052.60 mm and the minimum is 3745.50 mm. In specialised localities, in the higher reaches (where there are no rain gauges), the rainfall goes as high as over 6000 mm. Most (more than 70%) of the rainfall is obtained during the southwest monsoon in June, July and August months.

The retreating monsoon though less pronounced, is an important source of moisture in October, November and December, which constitutes 14% of the total. Summer rains vary widely and is not dependable.

In the Peninsular India the vegetation type and growing period are determined by the extent of dry period rather than by the amount of rainfall.

The spread of rainy days across time (around the year) is a crucial determining factor in the plant growth. The dry period in the area varies between three and four months when the monthly rainfall is below 50 mm, and the number of rainy days varies from 100 to 120. Variation is observed in the quantity of rainfall as the altitude changes to higher levels.

=== Temperature ===
The temperature at the foothills varies from 11.0°C to 40.0°C. The diurnal variations are moderate. As the altitude increases the variation is comparatively small, between 8.0°C and 25.0°C. The hottest months are April and May. December to February is relatively cool.

=== Humidity ===
At the foothills the humidity varies from 60% to 100%.

=== Winds ===
Regular winds lash the area during the southwest monsoon period. Strong winds of dry nature blow from September to April, causing dryness in the locality with the result there is a fire hazard, especially in the deciduous forests.

=== Microclimate ===
Locations where very high rainfall and peculiar soil conditions in the folds of the hills bring in specialised microclimatic situations leading to a peculiar habitat, which supports relatively specialised vegetation. Such portions are found here and there on the higher reaches.
