= Elapeedika =

Village in Kerala, India

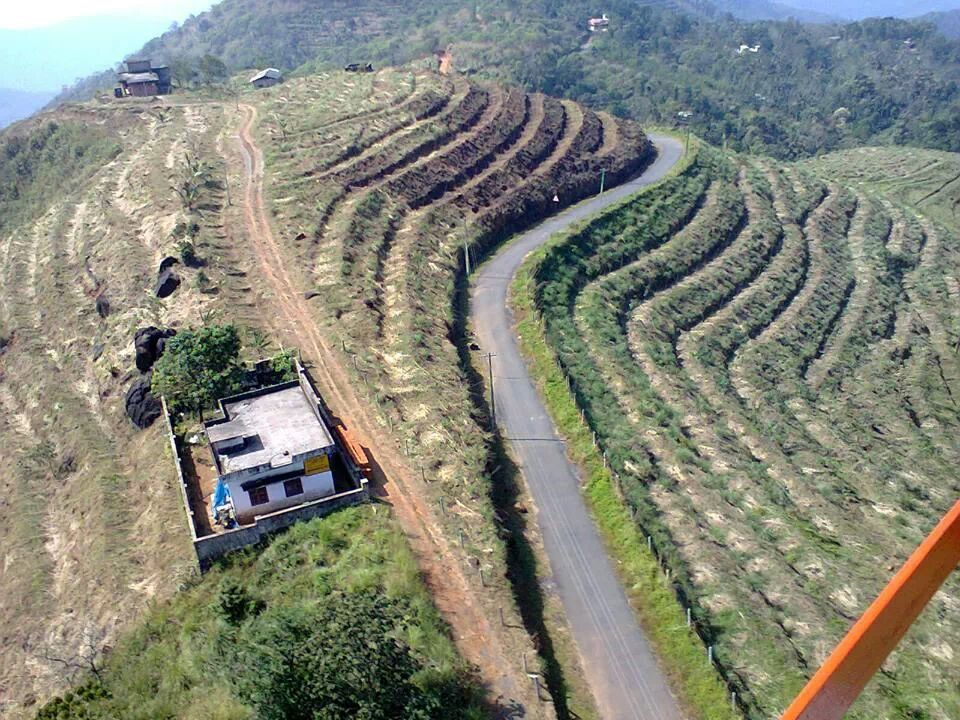
Elapeedika Kolakkad Road

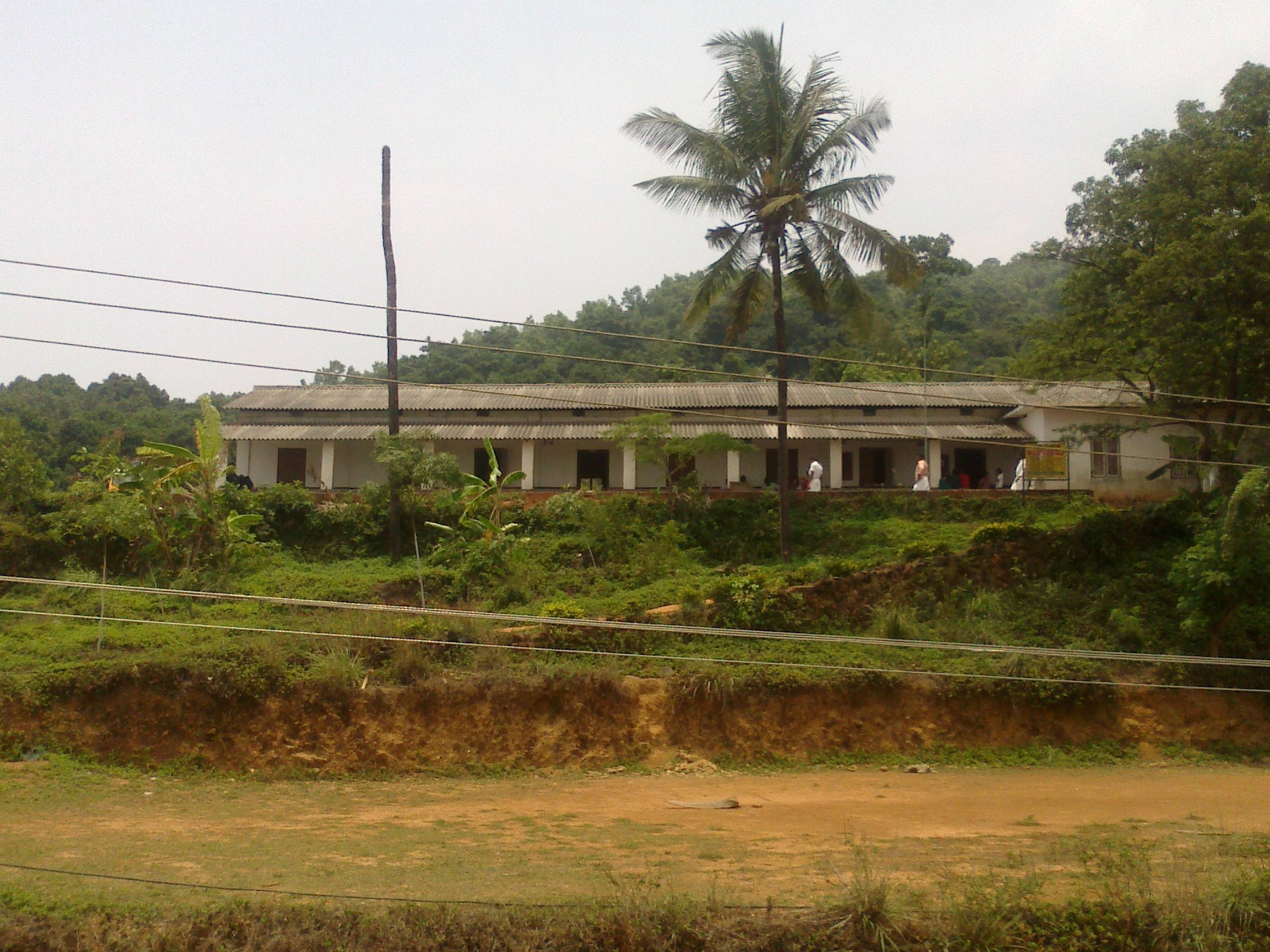
Elapeedika School

Elapeedika is a village in the kelakam panchayat in state of Kerala, India.

== Geography ==
Elapeedika is situated around 1000 m above sea level, in the Western Ghats range of mountains. It is a hill station.

== Etymology ==
The name Elapeedika is derived from the words elam ("cardamom") and peedika ("shop"). There was a lot of cardamom plantation in the olden times. During the foreign rule, the cardamom produced in Wayanad was brought and stored in this area located in the valley of Wayanad for export to foreign countries. So the place where cardamom was sold was called Elapeedika, which became the name of the place.

== History ==
Pazhassiraja's force and East India Company fought a battle in the 18th century at the Periya pass in Elapeedika.

== Transportation ==
The national highway passes through Kannur town. Mangalore and Mumbai can be accessed on the northern side and Cochin and Thiruvananthapuram can be accessed on the southern side. The road to the east of Iritty connects to Mysore and Bangalore. The nearest railway station is Kannur on Mangalore-Palakkad line. There are airports at Mangalore and Calicut.

== Location ==
Elapeedika is situated near Kolakkad at Peravoor in Iritty Taluk, Kannur district, Kerala state, India. It is the highest place in Kannur District. One can see the whole area of Kannur district and Arabian Sea from here.

It has a Roman Catholic church dedicated to St Sebastian and it is the highest church from sea level in Kannur District.

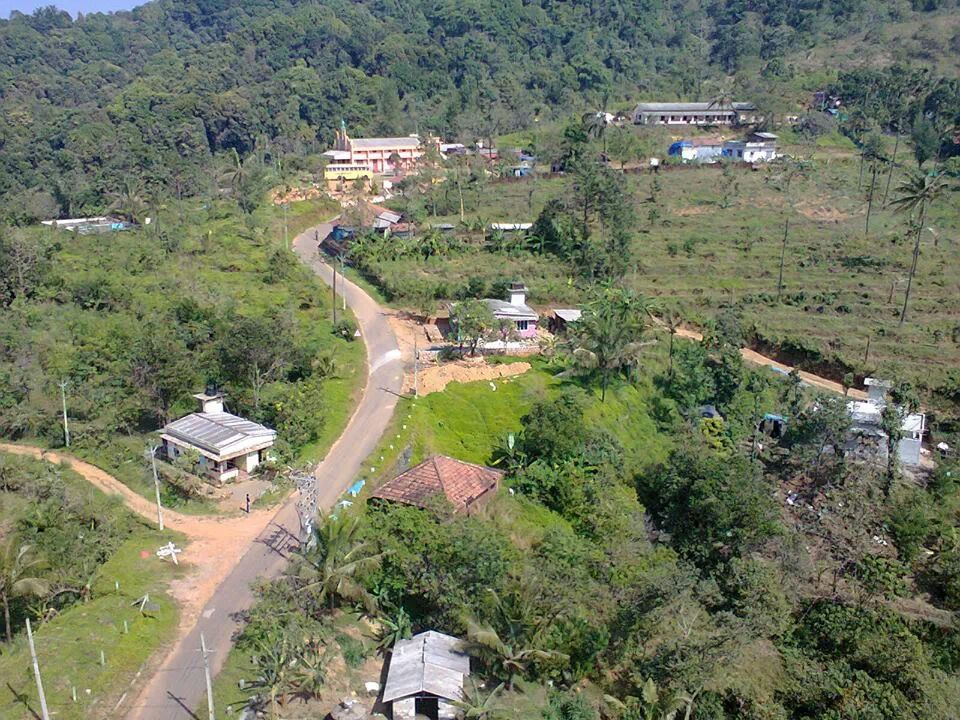
Town

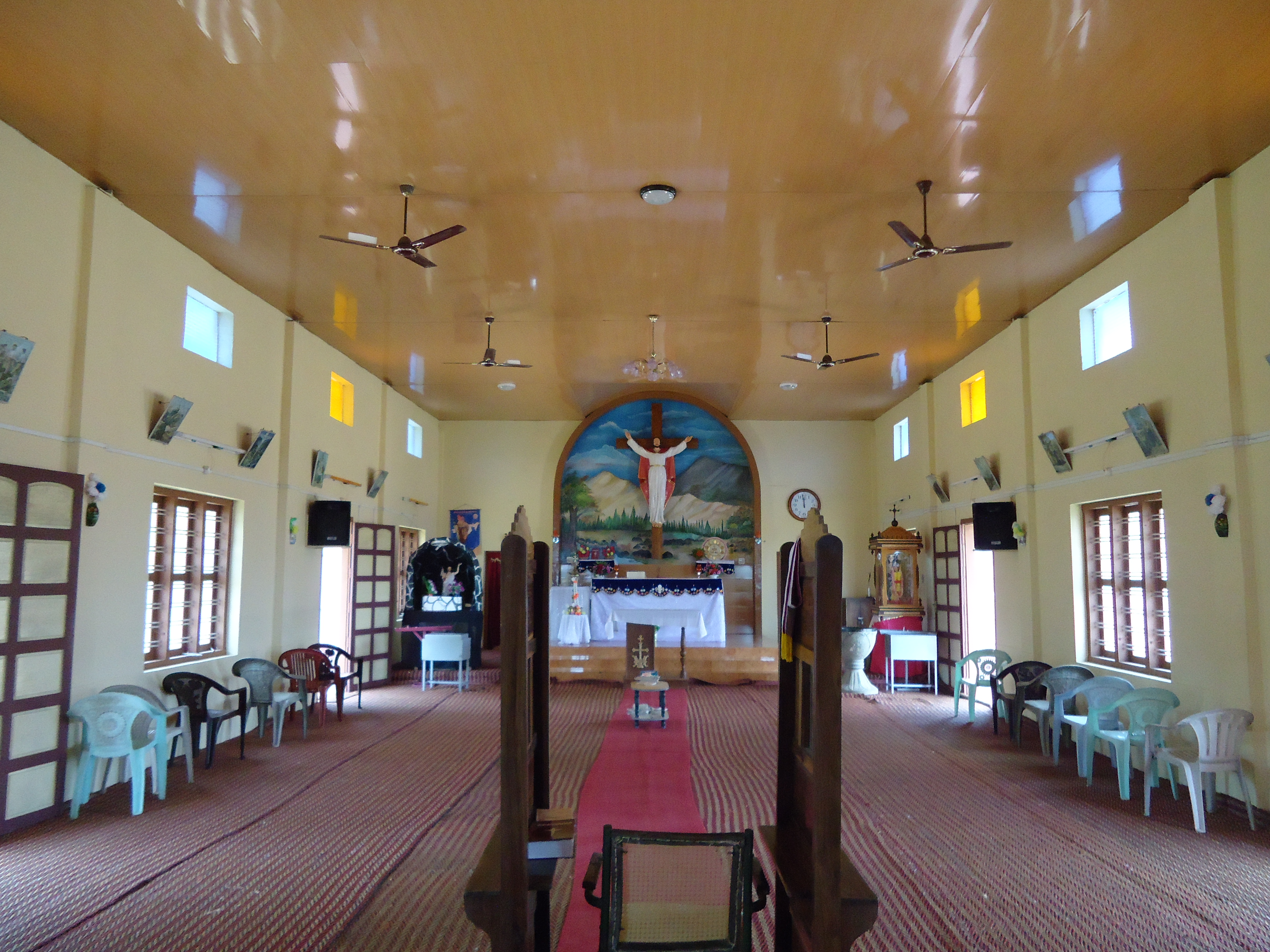
Church

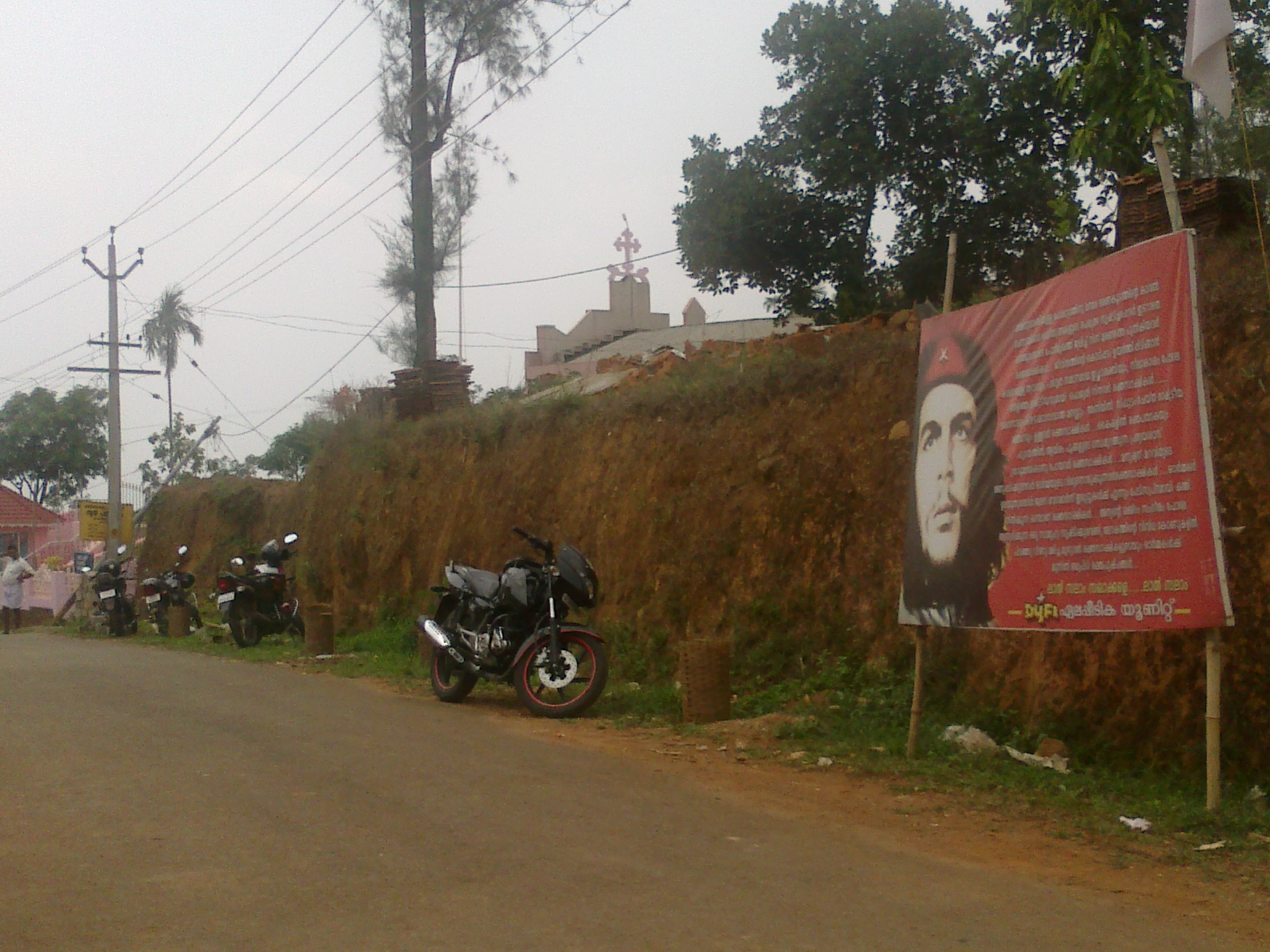
Church side

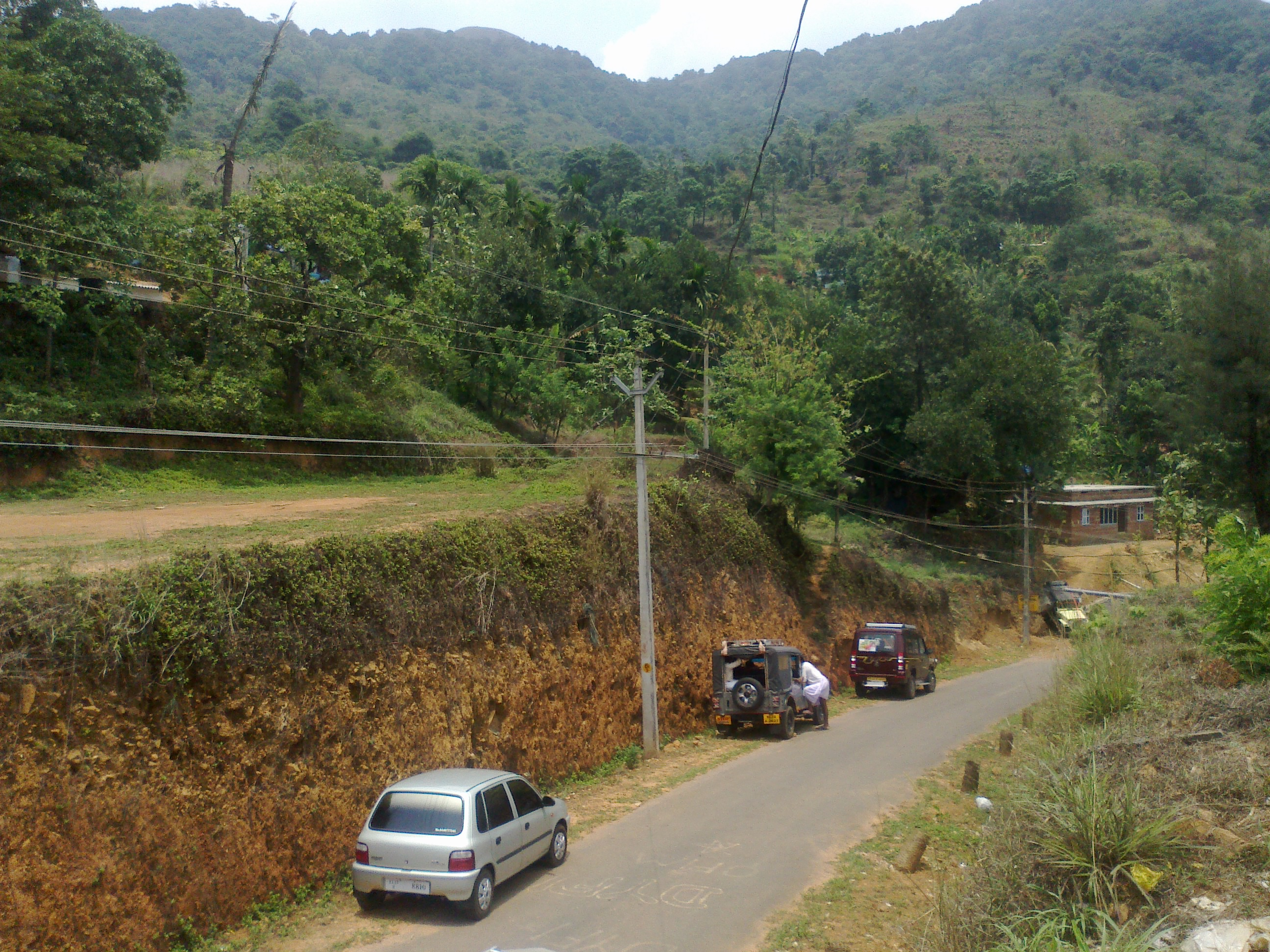
Village
