= V. K. Agarwal =

Indian academic

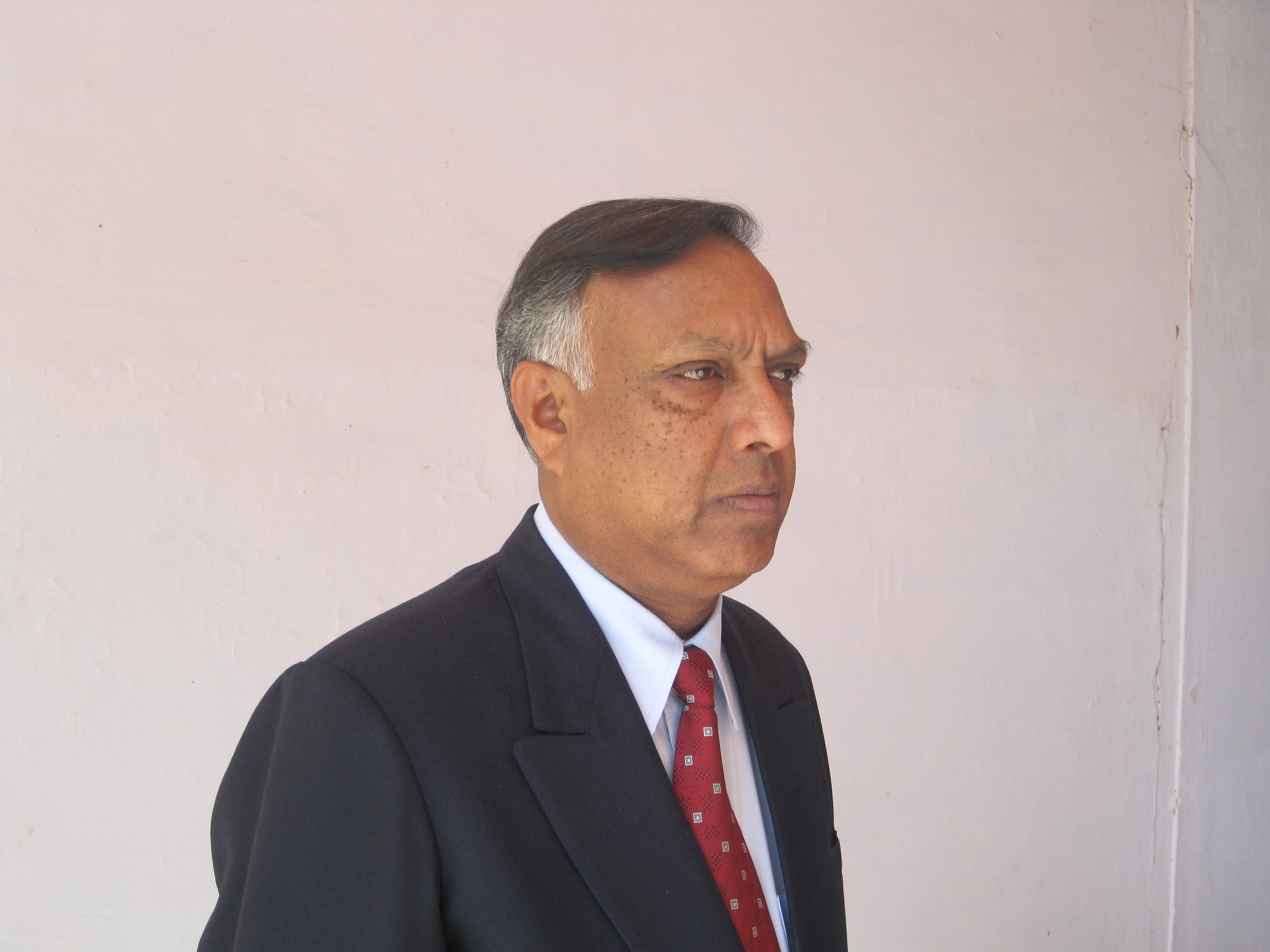
- Education: University of Delhi, Kurukshetra University
- Occupation: Law scholar

V. K. Agarwal is an Indian law scholar and academic administrator. He was vice-chancellor at Jagan Nath University, Jaipur from May 1, 2012 to August 15, 2018 and has been pro-chancellor there from August 16, 2018.

== Education ==
Agarwal obtained his B.Sc. in 1972; LL.B. in 1975 and LL.M. in 1977 from the University of Delhi. He obtained his Doctorate in Law from Kurukshetra University in 1986.

== Career ==
Agarwal joined Kurukshetra University Law Department in 1978. He was appointed Reader( Associate Professor)in 1987 and Professor in 1994. He has served in various positions including Dean Faculty of Law; Chairperson, Department of Law; Director, Institute of Law; Dean Academic Affairs and Registrar of Kurukshetra University. He has also served as Deputy Legal Advisor, Ministry of Law & Justice, Government of India. He later served as vice-chancellor of Jagan Nath University, Jaipur. He is currently Pro Chancellor of Jagannath University.

== Research papers & books ==
- Consumer Protection - Law and Practice (9th Edition 2024). New Delhi: Bharat Law House. ISBN 978-81-7737-294-6.
- Law of Consumer Protection (Student edition) (5th Edition 2025) Bharat Law House. New Delhi. ISBN 978-81-1956-533-7.
- Competition Act 2002- Principles and Practices (3rd Edition 2026) Bharat Law House. New Delhi. ISBN 978-81-19565-34-4.
- Competition Act 2002, Student Edition (2nd Ed.). New Delhi: Bharat Law House. 2019. ISBN 978-93-5139-698-7.
- Law of Contract-Principles and practices (2001, 2003, 2004, 2006, 2008). International Law Book service Malaysia. ISBN 978-967-89-1962-3.
- Consumer Protection in India. New Delhi: Deep & Deep Publications. 1989. ISBN 81-7100-139-4.
- Concentration of economic power and monopolies in India: with special reference to MRTP Act. Deep & Deep Publications New Delhi. 1987. ISBN 81-7100-030-4.
