= Nand Lal (disambiguation) =

Nand Lal (1887–1959) was an Indian freedom fighter.

Nand Lal or Nanda Lal and variants may also refer to:

- Krishna, Hindu god, the son (lala) of Nanda
- Nand Lal (academic), Indian academic
- Nand Lal (Shiromani Akali Dal politician) (died 2019), Indian politician from the state of Punjab
- Bhai Nand Lal (1633–1713), Persian and Arabic poet
- Nand Lal Meena (disambiguation)
- Nand Lal Noorpuri (1906–1966), Punjabi poet, writer and lyricist
- Nand Lal (Himachal Pradesh politician) (1954–2026), Indian politician
- Nandalal Bose (1882–1966), Indian artist and a pioneer of modern Indian art
- Nandlal Choudhary (born 1933), Indian National Congress politician from Madhya Pradesh
- Nandlal Nayak, Indian composer and folk musician
- Nandlal Sharma, Indian politician and academic

== See also ==
- Nandalala, a 2010 Indian film
- Nandalal Borgohain City College, college in Assam, India
- Nand Lal Singh College, college in Bihar, India
