= Ladwa =

- Town
- Ladwa tehsil in Kurukshetra district (Haryana)

- Location in Haryana, India Ladwa (India)
- Coordinates: 29°59′45″N 77°02′24″E
- Country: India
- State: Haryana
- District: Kurukshetra
- Elevation: 209 m (686 ft)

Population (2011)
  - Total: 28,887

Languages
  - Official: Hindi, Regional Haryanvi] [Punjabi language|Punjabi]
- Time zone: UTC+5:30 (IST)
- PIN: 136132
- Area code: +91 1744
- ISO 3166 code: IN-HR
- Vehicle registration: HR 97
- Sex ratio: 1.133 males/female ♂/♀
- Website: haryana.gov.in

Ladwa is a town and a municipal committee, located 18 kilometres from Kurukshetra city in the Kurukshetra district of Haryana. It is the current seat of Haryana CM Nayab singh Saini.

Ladwa has an average elevation of 209 m (686 ft). It is located on the Kurukshetra - Yamunanagar - Saharanpur road and is also close to the towns of kurukshetra, Shahbad, Radaur and Indri, India. The nearest major Highway is National Highway 1 (India) known as Grand Trunk Road which is 14.5 km (9.0 mi) west of downtown. Ladwa used to have one of the best new grain markets all over Asia.

== Tehsil ==
Ladwa is a tehsil in Kurukshetra district which includes Babain sub-tehsil. Ladwa tehsil includes total number of 98 villages. Ladwa includes 53 whereas Babain sub-tehsil includes 45 villages.

=== Villages ===
Villages under Ladwa—Badarpur, Bahlolpur, Bakali, Ban, Bani, Bapda, Bapdi, Baraichpur, Baraunda, Baraundi, Baraut, Barshami, Bhalar, Bhalari, Bharthauli, Bhut majra, Bir Bhartauli, Brahan, Budha, Chhalaundi, Chhapra, Dab khera, Dehra, Dhandla, Dhanora Jattan, Dhudi, Dudha, Dugaheri, Gadli, Gajlana, Gharaula, Gobindgarh, Girdharpura Gudha, Halalpur, Haripur Jainpur, Jalaludin Majra, Jandhera, Jogi majra, Kharkali, Kheri Dabdalan, Kishan Garh, Ladwa, Lathi dhanaura, Mehra Muniyarpur Mehuwa Kheri, Murad Nagar, Nakhrojpur, Niwarsi, Pahladpur, Salempur, Samalkha, Shahzadpur, Sultanpur, Sura, Sonti

Villages under Babain—Babain, Baghrat, Berthla, Bhagwanpur, Bhaini, Bhukhri, Bint, Bir Kalwa, Bir Mangoli Sainian Bir Sujra, Buhavi, Danani, Ghisarpari, Guhan, Hamidpur, Haripura, Isherheri, Jandaula, Kali Rano, Kalwa, Kandoli, Kanoni, Kasithal, Khaira, Khairi, Khirki Viran, Lakhmadi, Lohara, Mandokhra, Mangoly Jattan, Mangoly Rangdan, Phallsanda Jattan, Phallsanda Rangdan, Ram Nagar-112, Ram Nagar-156, Ram Saran Majra, Rampura, Rurki, Sanghor, Simbalwal, Sujra, Sujri, Sunario, Tatka, Tatki.

== Demographics ==
According to the 2011 Census of India, Ladwa has a total population of 28,887 person comprising 15,345 Males and 13,542 Females. Males constitute 53.1% and females 46.87% of the population. Ladwa has an average literacy rate of 72.3%, lower than the national average of 72.99%: male literacy is 76.3%, and female literacy is 67.8%. In Ladwa, 12.4% of the population lies between age group 0–6 years.

=== Crops ===
Paddy and wheat are the main crops which are cultivated in Ladwa in rainy season and winter season respectively. Other crops are sunflowers, sugar cane, pulses, turmeric, and maize, etc.

== Education ==
=== Public schools ===
- Government Senior Secondary School
- Government Girls High School
- Jawahar Navodaya Vidyalaya

=== Private schools ===
- Hindu High School(Govt. Aided)
- Guru Nanak High School(Govt. Aided)
- Sant Nischal Singh Public School
- The Discovery World School
- New Janta Sr. Sec. School
- Sugni Devi Arya Girls Sr. Sec. School
- Om Parkash Garg Memorial Public School
- Doon Public School
- Unique Shiksha Niketan
- Jai Bharat High School
- Tagore High School
- Sanjay Gandhi Memorial Public School
- GENIUS VOICE INSTITUTE
- CAMBRIDGE MONTESSORY PRE-SCHOOL
- SAHARA INTERNATIONAL SCHOOL

=== Colleges and universities ===
Indira Gandhi National College Ladwa. There is easy access to colleges and universities.

=== Broadband Service Available in Ladwa ===
There are many Broadband service providers in Ladwa which provide high speed fiber internet throughout the city.

- BSNL
- Netplus
- Falconet(Airtel Broadband)
- Planet WIFI

== Festivals ==
India is a country of festivals where every day is a new festival and people of Ladwa also celebrate many of them. The main festivals of Ladwa are:

- Deepawali is the festival of happiness which is connected with their religious history.
- Teej is celebrated by girls in which they swing again and again and distribute sweets among them.
- Holi is the festival of colour.
- Guru Purab is the celebration of birthday of Guru Nanak.

== Public health care ==
Community Health Center and Primary Health Center is the only government infrastructure which serves local community. In the past few years many private hospitals have come up in the town to provide better medical facilities to the people of Ladwa.

== Transportation ==
=== Airports ===
Indira Gandhi International Airport is the nearest major international airport which is situated in delhi at a distance of 180 kilometres (112 mi). In addition, Chandigarh International Airport situated in the proximity of approx. 106 kilometres (66 mi), is serving few non-stop international and domestic flights.

=== Rail ===
The closest Train Stations are located at Kurukshetra, Yamunanagar, Karnal and Ambala. The divisional headquarters of Northern Railway Zone (India) and major Train station are located at Ambala Cantonment in the Ambala which is about 45 km (28 mi) away. A new railway line from Karnal to Yamunanagar will go via Ladwa.

=== Road ===
The road transportation is provided by Haryana Roadways which runs on all the Inter State and City routes. Moreover, Village are well-connected by Bus.

== See also ==
- Ladwa State
- Kurukshetra
