= Jhansa =

Coordinates: 30°07′N 76°44′E

Jhansa is a town in Kurukshetra in the north Indian state of Haryana. It is situated on the banks of the Shri Markanda River. Nearby cities include Shahabad (18 km away), Pehowa, and Kurukshetra (20 km away).

Jhansa has an ancient history associated with it. "Jhansa" is a Hindi word which means "to betray". During Mahabharata war, Kaurvas betrayed Abhimanyu (son of Arjuna) and trapped him. They killed him by unethical ways. From that time, this place is known as Jhansa. This place is nearly 18 km away from Jyotisar (place where Lord Krishna delivered the holy Geeta Gyan to Arjuna).

Jhansa is run by the Gram panchayat of Jhansa. The primary occupation of its people is agriculture. The surrounding villages are Shanti Nagar, Rohti, Tangore, Mega Majra, Gogpur, and Ajrana. The approximate population of Jhansa is 20,000.
