= Dalel Singh Ror =

Indian volleyball player

Dalel Singh Ror is an Indian volleyball player who received one of the country's highest sporting honours, the Arjuna Award, in 1990. Dalel Singh was born on 10 June 1956 in Amin village near Kurukshetra, in Haryana.
