= Som Nath Sachdeva =

Vice-Chancellor of Kurukshetra University

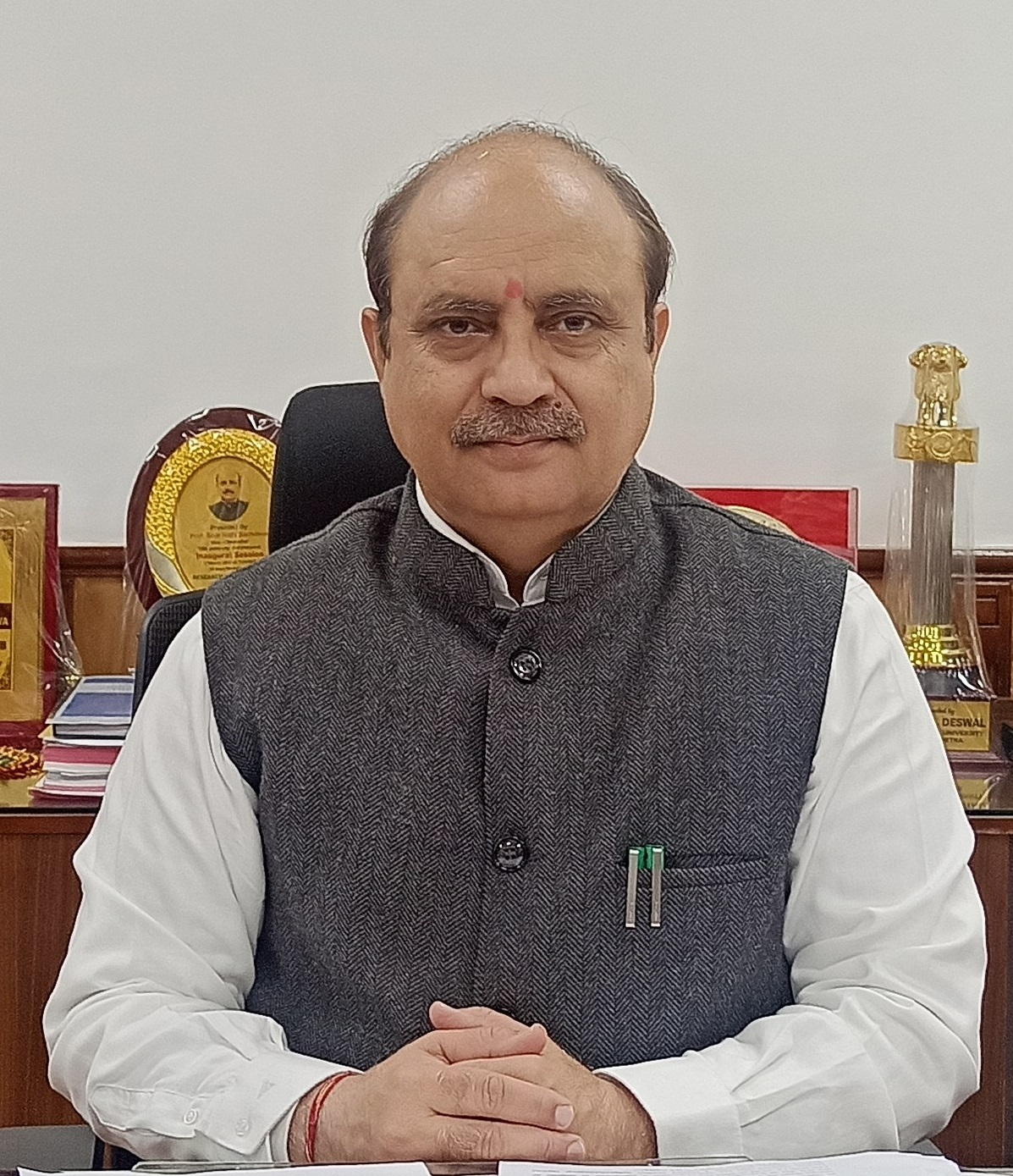

Vice-Chancellor of Kurukshetra University
- Incumbent
- Assumed office 10 November 2020

Personal details
- Education: Regional Engineering College, Kurukshetra; Punjab Engineering College, Chandigarh ; Kurukshetra University
- Profession: Professor (Civil engineering)
- Website: https://kuk.ac.in/vice_chancellor-2/

Som Nath Sachdeva is an Indian academic administrator and professor (civil engineer). He has been the Vice-Chancellor of Kurukshetra University, Haryana, since November 2020. His term was extended for another three years.

== Early life and education ==
Sachdeva studied B.Sc. civil engineering at the Regional Engineering College, Kurukshetra (now National Institute of Technology, Kurukshetra). He earned a Master of Engineering in Highways from Punjab Engineering College, Chandigarh, in 1987, and later obtained a Ph.D. in civil engineering from Kurukshetra University.

== Career ==
Sachdeva began his teaching career at Punjab Engineering College, Chandigarh, before joining the National Institute of Technology, Kurukshetra (formerly Regional Engineering College). He worked in the Department of Civil Engineering, where he also served as Head of Department.

He has authored publications on transportation engineering, pavement design, and road safety. Sachdeva has authored more than 100 publications.

At NIT Kurukshetra, Sachdeva held positions including chief warden, grievance cell director, and professor in charge of examinations. He was also associated with the National Cadet Corps. He has been a member of committees of the Indian Roads Congress, the National Board of Accreditation, and the National Assessment and Accreditation Council.

In November 2020, Sachdeva was appointed Vice-Chancellor of Kurukshetra University. His term was extended for three years in September 2023. During his tenure, the university received an A++ grade from NAAC in 2024, the first state university in Haryana to achieve this grade.

He has also held additional charge as Vice-Chancellor of Ch. Ranbir Singh University, Jind, Shri Krishna Ayush University, Kurukshetra, and Maharshi Dayanand University, Rohtak.

== Recognition ==
- Best paper gold medal from the Journal of the Indian Roads Congress.
- Outstanding Vice-Chancellor of India Award (2025), conferred by the Indian Education Network.
- Champion of Education Award (2024), presented in New Delhi for contributions to entrepreneurship and skill development.
- Environment Champion Award (Wildlife Warriors category), received by Kurukshetra University in 2025.

== Personal life ==
Sachdeva is married to Mamta Sachdeva, an educationist and social worker. The couple has two sons.
