= Mamta Sodha =

Indian mountaineer

Personal information
- Nationality: Indian
- Born: 1 November 1979 (age 47) Kaithal, Haryana, India
- Occupation: Mountaineer

Climbing career
- Major ascents: Mount Everest in 2010; Mount Elbrus in 2012

Mamta Sodha is an Indian sportsperson, known for her successful 2010 attempt to scale Mount Everest. She was honoured by the Government of India, in 2014, by bestowing on her the Padma Shri, the fourth highest civilian award, for her services to the field of mountaineering sport.

== Biography ==
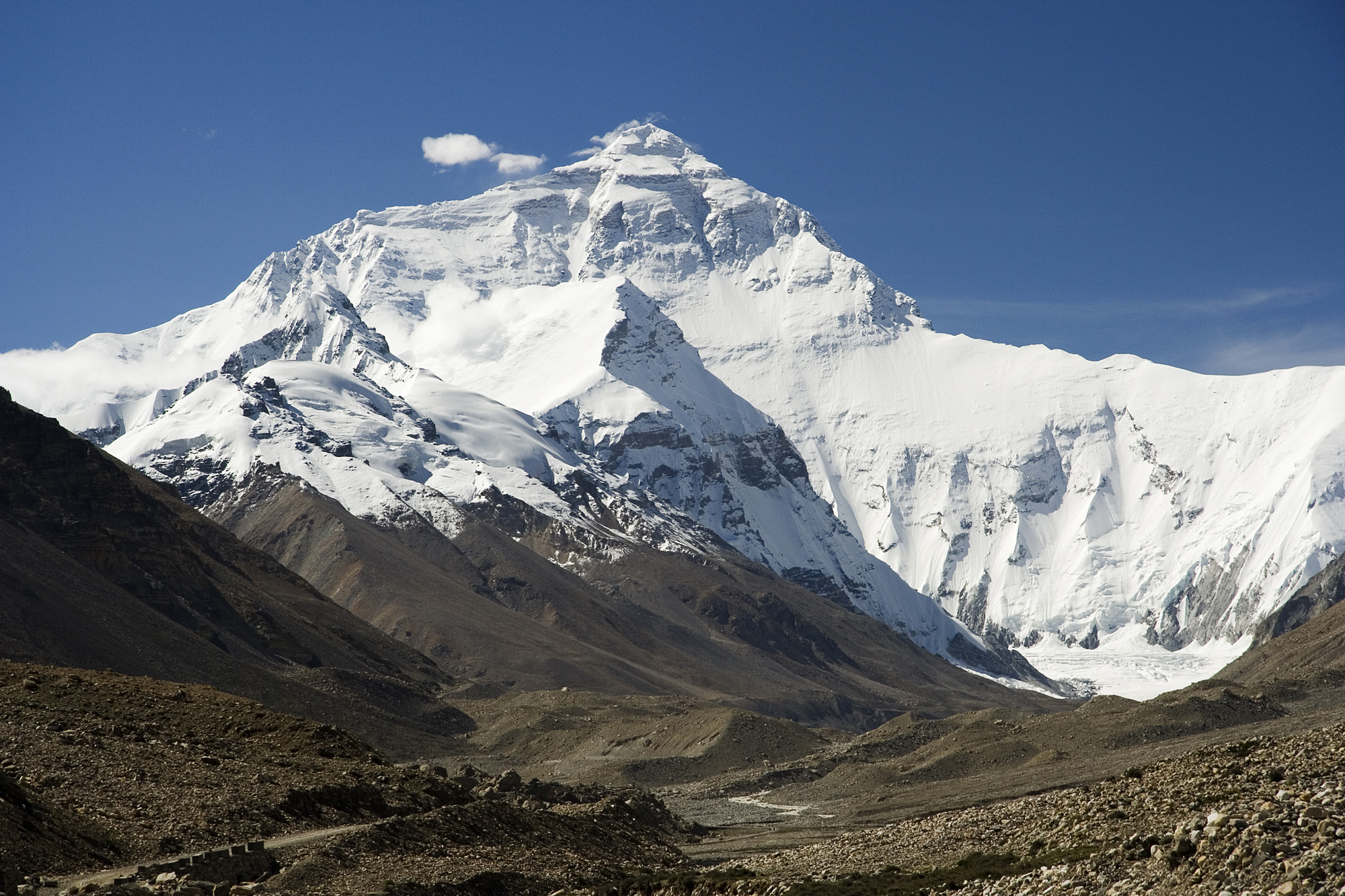
Everest North Face toward Base Camp Tibet Luca Galuzzi 2006

Mamta Sodha was born on 1 November 1979, at Kaithal, in the state of Haryana, in India, in a family with poor financial resources, as the eldest of three girls and two boys. She lost her father, Laxman Dass Sodha, who worked as an inspector with the Haryana Food and Supplies Department, in 2004, and her mother, Mewa Devi, had to support the family with the help of her brothers.

Mamta did her schooling at a local school in Kaithal and college studies at the RKSD College, Kaithal from where she secured her graduate degree, getting high grades. Subsequently, she earned her master's degree in Physical Education (MPhEd) from Kurukshetra University, in 2005 and joined the same university at the Shaheed Baba Deep Singh College of Physical Education, Haryana, as a lecturer.

After the successful Everest climb, the Government of Haryana absorbed her into the Haryana Police Force. Mamta Sodha is now a Deputy Superintendent of Police with Haryana Police since 11 August 2010.

== Sporting achievements ==
Mamta had a passion for rock climbing early on, a trait encouraged by her father. Soon, she made up her mind to climb Mount Everest one day for which she joined the Nehru Institute of Mountaineering, in the state of Uttarakhand. Prior to embarking on the project, she scaled a few other peaks. She was a member of the IMF Golden Jubilee expedition team that scaled Phawararang Peak in July 2008. Two months later, in October, she climbed the Mun Peak with another team, while on an expedition at McLeod Ganj. In August 2009, she summited Shri Kanth Peak with an all-women team.

She has also scaled other peaks of varying heights such as Morni Peak, Khüiten Peak, Inderhara Pass and Island Peak on various occasions. This was followed by an attempt on Island (Imja-tse) Peak which she successfully accomplished in April 2010, just prior to the Mount Everest expedition.

The total financial outlay for the Everest project was around ₹1.8 million. Mamta collected the money by way of contributions from several agencies and individuals such as Haryana state government (₹300,000), PWD Minister, Randeep Singh Surjewala (₹51,000), Kurukshetra member of parliament, Navin Jindal (₹500,000}, District Police Commissioner Amneet P Kumar (₹250,000) and various others and the project started in April 2010, with the encouragement of previous Everest climbers Bachendri Pal and Santosh Yadav. The expedition team consisted of 13 members, of which nine mountaineers were from United States, Denmark, Switzerland and Australia and the remaining four from India, including 16-year-old Arjun Vajpai. The team was led by the legendary Apa Sherpa, who held the world record of 19 successful climbs of Mount Everest. The team spent 40 days at Khumbu Glacier, where the team had set up their base camp, for acclimatisation. The route was the traditional South Col route in Nepal. The team, after periodic stop overs at three or four camps en route, finally reached the top around 20 May 2010. At 10.24 am, on 22 May, 2010, Mamta Sodha summited Mount Everest.

After the Everest triumph, Mamta scaled the highest peak in Europe, Mount Elbrus, in 2012.

Apart from being a mountaineer, Mamta Sodha excelled in handball, too. She was a member of the Haryana state girls team which secured runner up position at the 21st Junior Girls' National Handball Championship, held at Agra in November 1998. As a member of the Kurukshetra University team, she was a winner at the All India Inter-University Handball tournament in December 1998. In 2003, she was selected as a B1 grade sportsperson in Handball by the Sports and Youth Welfare department of Haryana Government.

Mamta Sodha is also a member of National Adventure Club.

== Awards and recognitions ==
- Padma Shri – Government of India – 2014
- Tenzing Norgay National Adventure Award – Government of India – 2010
- Cash Award ₹ 2.1 million – Government of Haryana – 2010

== See also ==
- Apa Sherpa
- Tenzing Norgay
- Edmund Hillary
- Bachendri Pal
- Indian summiters of Mount Everest - Year wise
- List of Mount Everest summiters by number of times to the summit
- List of Mount Everest records of India
- List of Mount Everest records
