= Nand Lal Meena =

Nand Lal Meena may refer to:

- Nand Lal Meena (born 1936), Indian politician from Baran district, Rajasthan
- Nand Lal Meena (born 1946) (1946–2025), Indian politician, cabinet minister in the Government of Rajasthan

== See also ==
- Nand Lal (disambiguation)
- Meena (disambiguation)
