= University Institute of Engineering and Technology, Kurukshetra University =

Coordinates: 29.94906°N 76.817254°E

- Established: June 2004
- Director: Prof. Sunil Dhingra
- Location: Kurukshetra, Haryana, India
- Website: www.uietkuk.ac.in

The University Institute of Engineering & Technology (UIET) is an autonomous engineering institute established at Kurukshetra University in 2004 as the university's department for Engineering and Technology.

== Background ==
It is a Haryana state-government premier engineering institute situated in the campus of Kurukshetra University. In 2002, the government issued an order to promote the existing REC, Kurukshetra to the status of National Institute of Technology (NIT), consequently making it an independent deemed university separated from Kurukshetra University.

Therefore, UIET Kurukshetra was started as Kurukshetra University's department of engineering in 2004 with the help of the World Bank and functions as a self-financed college.

The institute is headed by Institute Director: Professor Sunil Dhingra, is staffed by government employed faculty (permanent and contractual) and administered by a dedicated Board of Governance (BOG), led by the Vice-Chancellor of Kurukshetra University.

== Ranking ==
As of 2024, it is ranked #157 among the engineering institutes in India by Times Engineering Survey. The institute does not feature separately in the Indian Government's NIRF rankings, but Kuruksheta University as a whole is ranked #91 in their list for State Public Universities as of 2024.

== Departments and Courses ==
UIET offers Bachelor of Technology (B.Tech) undergraduate (UG) courses and Master of Technology (M.Tech) postgraduate (PG) courses in various engineering fields, as well as Doctor of Philosophy (PhD) courses. The institute has the following departments:

- Computer Science & Engineering Department (UG, PG, PhD)
- Electronics & Communication Engineering Department (UG, PG, PhD)
- Mechanical Engineering Department (UG, PG, PhD) (Dedicated block)
- Biotechnology Engineering Department (UG, PG, PhD)
- Electrical Engineering Department (PG, PhD)
- Applied Sciences Department
