= Bhim S. Dahiya =

Indian academician and politician

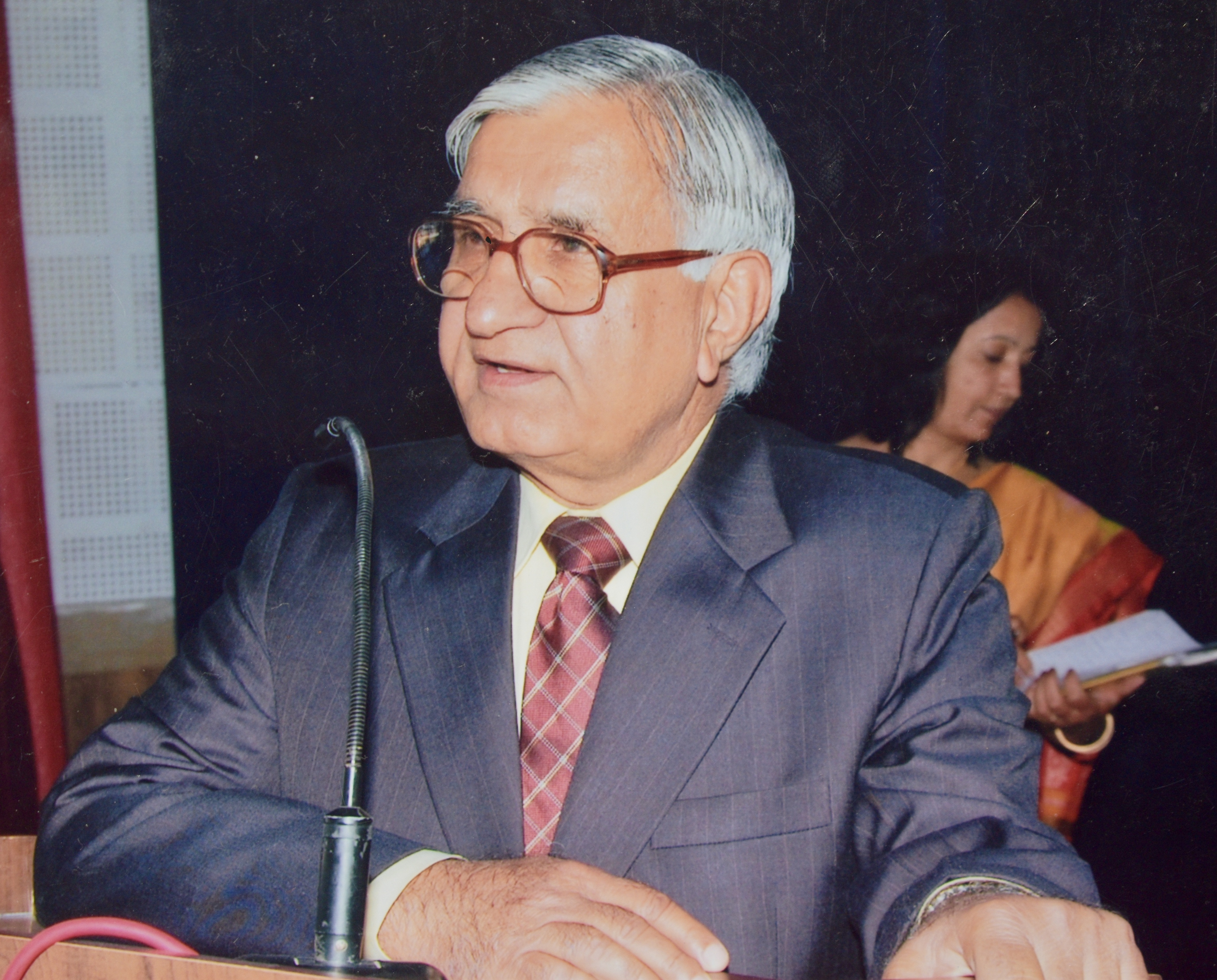
- Dahiya in 2009

Vice-Chancellor of Kurukshetra University
- In office July 1993 – July 1996
- Appointed by: Dhanik Lal Mandal
- Preceded by: Krishnaswami Balaram
- Succeeded by: M. L. Ranga

Member of Haryana Legislative Assembly
- In office 24 June 1982 – 23 June 1987
- Preceded by: Om Prakash Rana
- Succeeded by: Mohinder Singh
- Constituency: Rohat

Personal details
- Born: 7 April 1938 (age 88) Silana (Sonipat district), Punjab Province, British India (now in Haryana, India)
- Citizenship: India
- Children: 3
- Education: Panjab University (B.Sc.); Kurukshetra University (M.A.); University of Cincinnati (Ph.D.)
- Profession: Academic; writer; politician

Bhim Singh Dahiya (born 7 April 1938) is an Indian educationist, author and a politician. He was formerly Vice-Chancellor of Kurukshetra University and member of Haryana Legislative Assembly, elected to the assembly from Rohat constituency. Having numerous books to his name, he wrote extensively on literary criticism, educational reforms and politics of Haryana.

== Education ==
Dahiya received his early education in Rohtak, after-which he graduated from Panjab University with a B.Sc. degree in 1960. He received an M.A. in English with distinction from Kurukshetra University in 1963. While teaching, he obtained his Ph.D. from the University of Cincinnati, Ohio, in 1975.

== Life and career ==
Bhim Singh Dahiya was born on 7 April 1938. He started his teaching career as a lecturer at All India Jat Heroes' Memorial College, Rohtak, in 1963 and joined Delhi University in the same capacity in 1964, and then the Kurukshetra University in 1965.

He joined as a teaching fellow in University of Cincinnati's Department of English between 1971 and 1975 and was then awarded the Taft Fellowship for three years in the same university in 1973. During 1976–77, he served as reader at Kurukshetra University. He subsequently joined M.D. University as a professor of English during 1979 and 1980. He was a professor of English at Kurukshetra University from 1987 to 1991. During 1996–98, Dahiya was a senior research fellow at Indian Institute of Advanced Study.

He held multiple administrative positions also. He served as registrar of M.D. University from 1977 to 1979. Later became the Chairman of Department of English at Kurukshetra University from 1991 to 1992. Eventually became the Pro-Vice Chancellor of the same university and remained in the position from 1992 to 1993, finally he was appointed as the Vice-Chancellor in 1993 and held the position up to 1996. During 1996–1998, Dahiya remained on the board of directors of United States Educational Foundation in India (presently known as the United States-India Educational Foundation).

He briefly entered public life and remained Member of the Legislative Assembly (MLA) of Lok Dal party in Haryana Legislative Assembly (Haryana State Legislature), representing Rohat constituency (presently known as Kharkhauda Assembly constituency) from 1982 to 1987.

Dahiya has been President of The Shakespeare Association, India, since its inception in 2008. The Association organises international seminars and discussions on important literary events.

== Works ==
Dahiya's works include:

=== Books ===
- The Hero in Hemingway: A Study in Development. Bahri Publishers, New Delhi, 1978.
- Hemingway’s The Sun Also Rises: A Critical Introduction. Lakeside Publishers, Faridabad, 1986.
- Teaching English Literature. Lakeside Publishers, Faridabad, 1988.
- Poet-critics on Shakespeare. Ajanta International, Delhi, 1991.
- Hemingway's a Farewell to Arms: A Critical Study. Academic Foundation, New Delhi, 1991.
- Major Trends In English Literature (1837-1945). Academic Foundation, New Delhi, 1992.
- Sound in Sense: An Anthology of Poems. Oxford University Press, New Delhi, 1993.
- Higher Education in India: Some Reflections. Khama Publishers, New Delhi, 1996.
- Education in Independent India: Promises, Pressures, Pitfalls. Khosla Publishing House, New Delhi, 1998.
- The University Autonomy in India: The Idea and the Reality. Indian Institute of Advanced Study, Shimla, 2001.
- Objective Type Questions On Literature In English (for UGC's Net). Cee Bee Publications, Delhi, 2004.
- A New History of English Literature. Doaba Publications, New Delhi, 2005.
- Dr Sarup Singh and His Times: An Anecdotal Account. Shanti Prakashan, Ahmedabad, 2007.
- Power Politics in Haryana: A View from the Bridge. Gyan Publishing House, New Delhi, 2008.
- Postmodern Essays on Love, Sex, and Marriage in Shakespeare. Viva Books, New Delhi, 2008.
- Shakespeare's Intellectual Background. Viva Books, New Delhi, 2008.
- Scholars in Shakespeare: A Postmodern Scrutiny. The Shakespeare Association, Kurukshetra, 2010.
- Shakespeare: A New Biography. The Shakespeare Association, Kurukshetra, 2010.
- Shakespeare's Speculum: Essays on Social Issues. The Shakespeare Association, Kurukshetra, 2011.
- The Rise of Haryana and the Fall of Democracy. Shanti Prakashan, Ahmedabad, 2012.
- Women in Shakespeare: A Post-Feminist Review. Viva Books, New Delhi, 2013.

=== Scholarly articles ===
- "Structural Patterns in the Novels of Barth, Vonnegut and Pynchon", Indian Journal of American Studies, Vol. 5, No. 1 & 2 (Jan. & July, 1975), pp. 53–68. (Note: Later included in the 20th Century American Novel: A Collection of Critical Articles, ed. B.M. Bhalte (New Delhi: Kalyani Publishers, 1981), pp. 203-218.)
- "The Idea of Influence in Literature", Jodhpur Studies in English,. Vol. 1 (1980), pp. 85–95. (Note: Reprinted in Focus in Literature: Professor C.A. Shepard Commemoration Volume, ed. C.T. Thomas, Dr. S. Velayudhin, et al. (Madras: MacMillan, 1982), pp. 297-305.)
- "Stevens' Sunday Morning: A Reading", Indian Journal of American Studies, Vol. 8, No. 1 (January, 1978), pp. 1–8.
- "The Two Gentlemen of Verona as Comedy", Panjab University Research Bulletin (Arts), Vol. XI, No. 1 & 2 (1980), pp. 17–24.
- "Life and Arts in Hemingway's The Garden of Eden", Panjab University Research Bulletin (Arts), Vol. XX, No. 2 (October, 1989).
- "Shakespeare's Mona Lisa: Another Look at Hamlet", Panjab University Research Bulletin (Arts), Vol. XXIII, No. I (April, 1992), pp. 3–10.
- "Managing Supply and Demand in Human Resource Planning Through Universities", Human Resource Development: Global Changes and Strategies in 2000 A.D., ed. Uddesh Kohli and Dharni P. Sinha (New Delhi: Allied Publishers, 1994), pp. 121–129.
- "Higher Education Today: An Overview", Universities News, Association of Indian Universities, Vol. XXXILI, No. 10 (March 6, 1995), pp. 1–3.
- "Translating a Literary Text from English to an Indian Language: Difficulties and Challenges", University News, Association of Indian Universities, Vol. XXXIT, No.17 (April 24, 1995), pp. 1–3.
- "Challenges of Globalization For the Academic Profession", Global Civilization and Cultural Roots (Paris: International Association of Universities, 1995), pp. 124–129.
- "Treatment of Suffering in Wordsworth, Arnold and Auden", Panjab Journal of English Studies, Vol. 12 (1997), pp. 1–10.
