= Anu Singh Lather =

Indian professor

Prof. Anu Singh Lather
- Born: 12 October 1962 (age 64)
- Occupation: Vice-Chancellor
- Spouse: Anoop Lather
- Children: Astha Singh, Mannat Singh

Academic background
- Education: Panjab University (Chandigarh); Kurukshetra University

Anu Singh Lather (born 10 December 1962) is an Indian academic who is the second vice-chancellor of Ambedkar University Delhi. She was the pro-vice chancellor of Delhi Technological University and dean of the University School of Management Studies from 2008 to 2014. Lather was the founder and head of the department of applied psychology at Guru Jambheshwar University of Science and Technology.
