= Ishan Kumar Patro =

Indian academic

- Occupation: Academic

Academic background
- Education: Kurukshetra University

Ishan Kumar Patro is an Indian academic and former vice-chancellor of Ravenshaw University, Odisha, India.

== Education ==
Patro pursued his M.Phil. and Ph.D. from Kurukshetra University, Haryana. He did his post-doctoral research from University of Cologne in Germany.

== Career ==
Patro has a teaching experience of almost three decades. In 2017 Patro was appointed as the vice-chancellor of Ravenshaw University, India for a period of 3 years. He succeeded Prakash Chandra Sarangi in this position. Before joining as a vice-chancellor, Patro was working as a professor in Neuroscience/Zoology department of Jiwaji University, Gwalior. Madhya Pradesh.

Currently, he also serves as the president of Indian Academy of Neurosciences.

He received BK Bachhawat Lifetime Achievement Award for his contribution towards neuroscience.
