= Ram Saran Majra =

- Village
- Location in Haryana, India Ram Saran Majra (India)
- Coordinates: 30°04′43″N 77°00′05″E
- Country: India
- State: Haryana
- District: Kurukshetra
- Elevation: 209 m (686 ft)

Languages
  - Official: Hindi
- Time zone: UTC+5:30 (IST)
- PIN: 136156
- Telephone code: 01744
- ISO 3166 code: IN-HR
- Vehicle registration: HR
- Website: haryana.gov.in

Ram Saran Majra is a village in the Kurukshetra district of Haryana, India. It is 24 km from the land of Mahabharata i.e. Kurukshetra. This village is not very densely populated. but an estimated figure of its population stands at around 4000 persons. The main occupation of the people in this village is agriculture and other small-time enterprises. It is also sometimes known by the name 'Pathan Majra'. Even though there are no Muslim folks in this village at present. This village was reigned by the Pathan people at a time when the entire India was under Mughal's rule.

== Geography ==
This village is situated at a height of approximately 210 meters above sea level. The climate is typical of a tropical system.

== Demography ==
This village is mainly inhabited by Saini clan with the presence of other ethnic groups as well. Maximum Saini community have big Zamindar into this village. The total population of this village is estimated at 4000 persons. The literacy rate stands at 90%. All the modern facilities are available in this village, like Cricket Play ground, Zym, Private & Govt. School, Govt Hospital. This village has a typically planned layout. There is a shiv temple in the village which is very famous in nearby villages and is very old. Mela is conducted on the eve of Mahashivratri at the temple, People visit temple on Maha Shiv Ratri to worship. Dangal is organized by Village Pnchayat at the time of shiv ratri for two days and wrestlers come from surrounding states like HP, Punjab, UP, J&K and so on. There is a newly built temple of Hanuman on the bank of natural lake. There is a PHC and Veterinary hospital in the village. Axis Bank branch is also working in the village.

== Education ==
This village has a government high school which was established long back and was the only school in the vicinity of 10 km radius so people from the neighboring villages came here to study. This village also has various other small private schools.
