= Dr. B. R. Ambedkar University Delhi =

Public funded university in Delhi, India

Coordinates: 28°39′51″N 77°13′57″E

- The University logo with a Bodhi tree motif
- Other name: AUD
- Former names: Bharat Ratna Dr. B. R. Ambedkar University Delhi, Ambedkar University Delhi
- Type: Public
- Established: 2008; 18 years ago
- Academic affiliations: UGC, AIU, ACU
- Chancellor: Lieutenant Governor of Delhi
- Vice-Chancellor: Anu Singh Lather
- Faculty: 168 (2022)
- Students: 2,979 (2022)
- Undergraduates: 1,509 (2022)
- Postgraduates: 1,300 (2022)
- Doctoral students: 170 (2022)
- Location: Old Delhi, Delhi, India
- Campus: Urban Old Delhi (Kashmere Gate campus) - 16 acres West Delhi (Karampura campus) South Delhi (Lodi Road campus) - 2 acres North Delhi (Dheerpur campus - under construction) - 110 acres North-West Delhi (Rohini campus) Qutub Institutional Area (School of Heritage Research & Management)
- Website: aud.delhi.gov.in

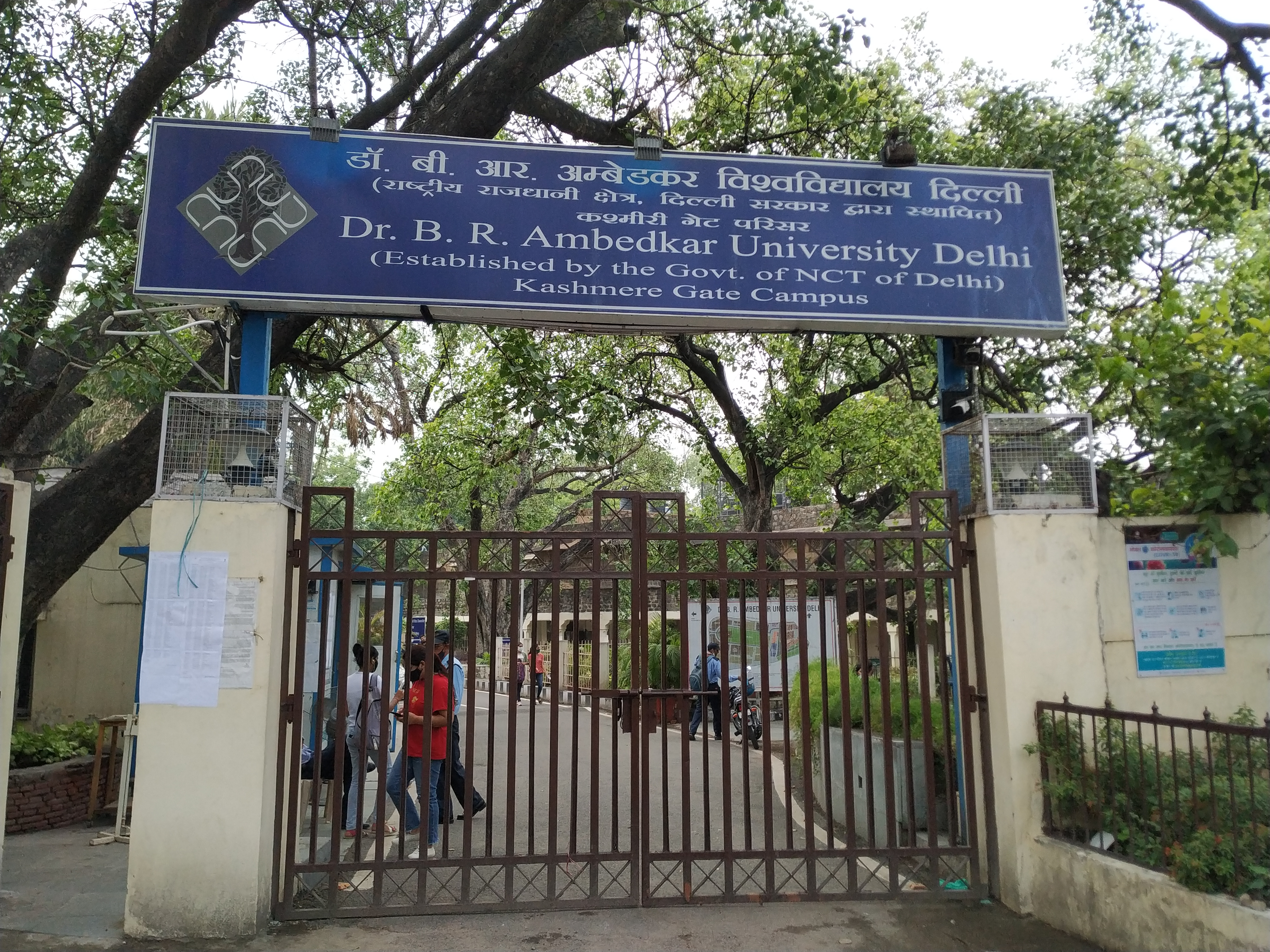
Dr. B. R. Ambedkar University, Kashmere Gate Campus, Delhi

Dr. B. R. Ambedkar University Delhi is a state university established by the Government of the NCT of Delhi through an Act of the Delhi Legislature. The university began functioning in August 2008. It is a Unitary non-affiliating University whose main focus is on undergraduate and postgraduate studies and on research in the Humanities and the Social Sciences. It is completely funded by the State Government of the NCT of Delhi. The university is now declared eligible to receive Central Government Assistance. The university has been graded 'A' by National Assessment and Accreditation Council. It is named after the polymath B. R. Ambedkar, the architect of the Indian Constitution and one of the founding fathers of India.

== Campuses ==
AUD is a multi-campus University with planned facilities across the city. AUD presently has three campuses - in Kashmere Gate, Karampura and, Lodi Road, where 40 undergraduate, postgraduate and research programmes are currently on offer.

The Kashmere Gate campus is housed in the erstwhile Guru Gobind Singh Indraprastha University campus, along with Indira Gandhi Delhi Technical University for Women. The historical campus originally built for Delhi College of Engineering also houses the 300-year-old Dara Shikoh library.

The Directorate of Higher Education, Government of the NCT of Delhi handed over the old campus of Deen Dayal Upadhyaya College of University of Delhi in the Karampura area of West Delhi to AUD. Deen Dayal Upadhyaya College will move to its new campus in Dwarka.

As of 2024 the university planned two new campuses, in Rohini and in Dheerpur.

== Schools ==
- School of Undergraduate Studies
- School of Development Studies
- School of Global Affairs
- School of Human Ecology
- School of Human Studies
- School of Culture and Creative Expressions
- School of Design
- School of Management
- School of Public Policy
- School of Educational Studies
- School of Law, Governance and Citizenship
- School of Liberal Studies
- School of Vocational Studies

== Centres ==
- Centre for Community Knowledge
- Centre for Development Practice
- Centre for Social Science Research Methods
- Centre for Early Childhood Education and Development
- Centre for Psychotherapy and Clinical Research
- Centre for Urban Ecology and Sustainability
- AUD Centre for Incubation, Innovation and Entrepreneurship
- Centre for English Language Education

== See also ==
- List of institutions of higher education in Delhi
- Government of Delhi
