= Naveen Soni =

Indian journalist and economist

Naveen Soni is an anchor with Zee Business and hosts their stock market and personal finance shows. He is perhaps the oldest and most popular face in Hindi Stock Markets coverage.

Soni, a trained Business Economist, did his Post-graduation in Business Economics (MBE) from Kurukshetra University. He started his career in Business Broadcast Journalism with the Delhi-based Jain TV in 2001. He later went to Mumbai to join Nimbus to host stock market shows on Doordarshan. He became known with the investor call-in based programme 'Investor's World' during the US-64 scam.

Soni came back to Delhi to rejoin Jain TV for a short stint before going to CNBC, when TV18 was planning to launch its Hindi initiative 'Awaaz'. He hosted Your Stocks, Bazar Aaj and Aaj Ka Karobar on CNBC India.

In 2004, he joined Zee's new Business channel, and is currently heading the stock market segment. He hosts shows like Apka Bazar, Antim Baazi in stocks, and The Money Show and Money Guru in the Personal Finance segment.

In 2008, Amity Business School rewarded him as the Best Business News Anchor for the year. Soni's core strength is believed to be understanding the pulse of investors and he is popular for talking like a friend (and sometimes like a family member) to his viewers. He has developed a unique style of anchoring which involves talking markets and investments in a simple and day to day jargon free language. He is also credited with bringing the hardcore and grassroot words used by broker community to use in Indian Media.
