= Vishva Nath Attri =

Indian academic

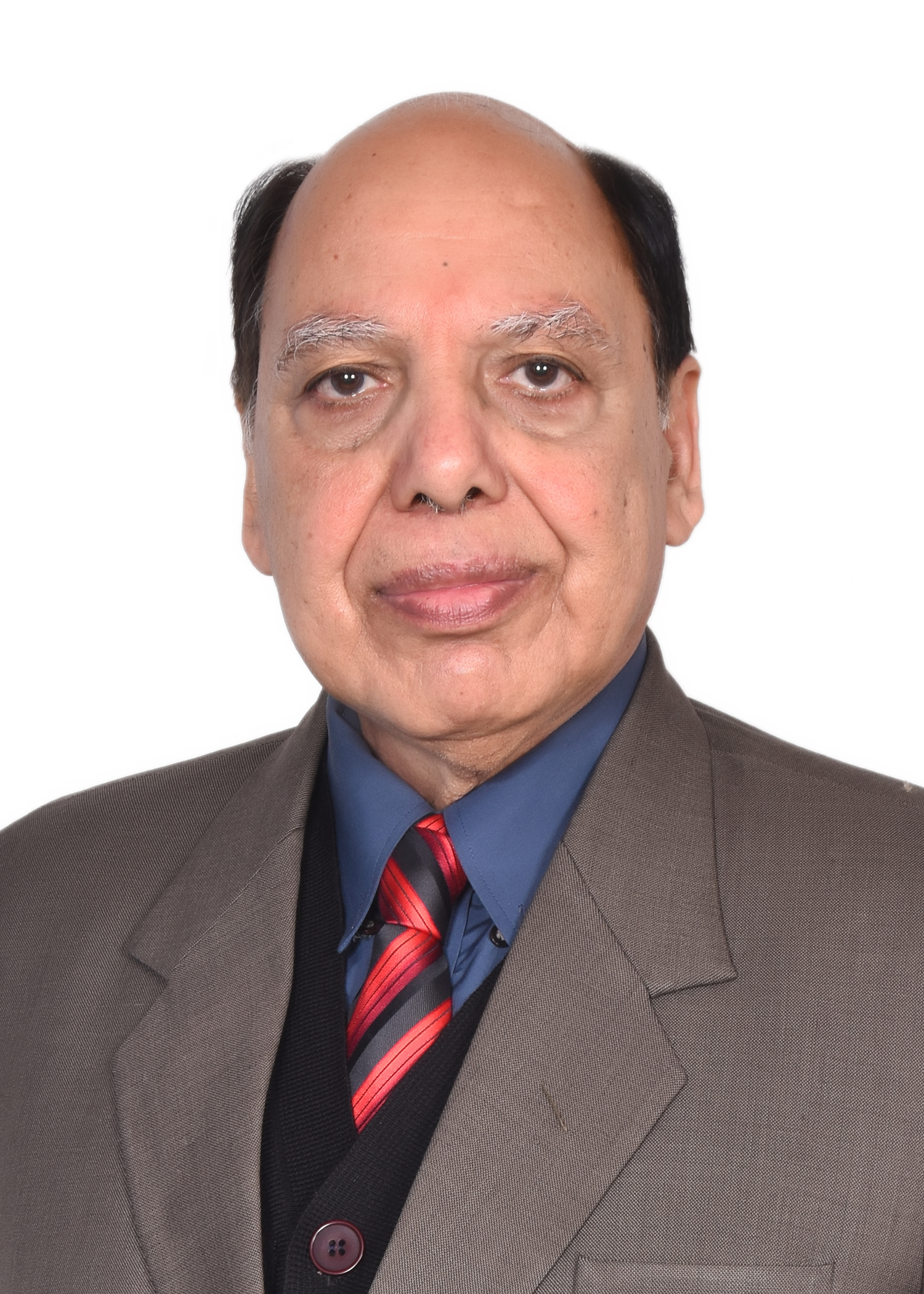
- Education: Kurukshetra University; George Washington University; University of California
- Known for: Chair in Indian Ocean Studies, Indian Ocean Rim Association, University of Mauritius, Republic of Mauritius, International Expert of Blue Economy

Vishva Nath Attri is an Indian professor and Chair in Indian Ocean Studies at the Indian Ocean Rim Association, University of Mauritius. He is the former Senior Fellow of the Indian Council of Social Science Research, Government of India.

Attri is also a visiting scholar at the University of California, Los Angeles and The George Washington University, USA.

== Education and career ==
Attri holds a Master of Arts in Economics and a Ph.D. in Economics from Kurukshetra University. He was also a Post-doctoral research Visiting scholar at the University of California, Los Angeles and The George Washington University.

Attri's policy briefs have been published in the United Nations Global Sustainable Development Reports in 2015, 2016, and 2019. He is the founder and managing editor of the Journal at Indian Ocean Rim Studies (JIORS), IORA.

Attri is also the founder chairman of the Blue Economy Forum at the University of Mauritius, Republic of Mauritius. He is a lead editor with the Human Sciences Research Council on the Blue economy Handbook. He has participated in IORA's Core Group Meetings and the First Ministerial Conference on the Blue economy. He was also appointed by the FICCI, India, as a Member in the First Blue Economy Task Force in 2016 and the reconstituted Blue Economy Task Force (BETF) in 2018.

In 2017, Attri completed "The Study on Bilateral and Regional Trade and Investment related to Agreements and Dialogues between Member States".

In March 2018, the World Bank acknowledged him as an expert on the Blue Economy and invited him to make an external review of the report, "Toward a Blue Economy: Pathways and Prospects for Bangladesh’s Investment in Sustainable Growth". In the same year, he participated in the 5th Indian Ocean Dialogue (IOD) in Durban, South Africa.

== Publication ==
Attri has published works on trade, sustainable development, International Environmental Regulation, and the Blue economy.

- The Blue Economy Handbook of the Indian Ocean Region (2018)
- IORA Blue Economy and Sustainable Development: lessons from MDG & Pathway for SDG’ was published in the book "Towards Sustainable Development: Lessons from MDGs and pathways for SDGs", by The Institute for Policy, Advocacy and Governance (IPAG), Dhaka 1205, Bangladesh, October 2017.
- "IORA's Past Present and Future", Published by University of Mauritius Reduit 2021
