= Kurukshetra University =

University in Haryana, India

- Other name: KUK
- Motto: Yogasthaḥ kuru karmāṇi
- Type: Education and Research
- Established: 1956; 70 years ago
- Accreditation: NAAC (A++ Grade)
- Affiliations: UGC; NAAC; AIU
- Chancellor: Governor of Haryana
- Vice-Chancellor: Som Nath Sachdeva
- Faculty: 256
- Administrative staff: 450
- Students: 10,000 +
- Postgraduates: 3,000 +
- Location: Kurukshetra, Haryana, India; 29°57′28″N 76°48′57″E
- Campus: Urban 473 acres
- Website: www.kuk.ac.in

Kurukshetra University is a university in Kurukshetra, India, established on 11 January 1956. The university was established with the objective of promoting higher education and advanced research in northern India. Over the decades, it has developed into a multidisciplinary institution offering programs in humanities, social sciences, natural sciences, engineering, management, law, education, and professional studies. The university is recognized by the University Grants Commission (UGC), accredited with an A++ Grade by NAAC, and enjoys Category-I autonomy under UGC regulations.

in Kurukshetra, Haryana. It is a member of Association of Commonwealth Universities.

== History ==
=== Foundation and Early Years ===
The university was in 1956 as a unitary residential university. The Department of Sanskrit was the only department in the university when it was inaugurated by Bharat Ratna Rajendra Prasad, the first President of India. The idea of establishing the university was conceived by then governor of Punjab, Chandeshwar Prasad Narayan Singh, a Sanskrit scholar. The university began its academic journey with a single department, the Department of Sanskrit, reflecting the historical and cultural significance of Kurukshetra as a center of Indian civilization and learning.

The establishment of the university formed part of the broader post-independence effort to expand access to higher education across India. Situated in a region associated with the Mahabharata and the Bhagavad Gita, the institution sought to combine traditional Indian knowledge systems with modern scientific and professional education.

=== Expansion ===
From its initial focus on Sanskrit studies, the university gradually expanded into multiple academic disciplines. New faculties, departments, research centers, and affiliated colleges were added over successive decades, transforming the institution into one of the major public universities in northern India. Today, it serves students through on-campus departments, distance education programs, and a large affiliated-college network.

== Philosophy and Motto ==
The university's motto, "Yogastha Kuru Karmani", is derived from the Bhagavad Gita. The phrase emphasizes the performance of duty with discipline, balance, and commitment. This philosophical foundation reflects the university's attempt to integrate ethical values with academic excellence.

== Accreditation and Recognition ==
=== NAAC Accreditation ===
In 2024, Kurukshetra University received the A++ Grade, the highest accreditation grade awarded by the National Assessment and Accreditation Council (NAAC). The university achieved a cumulative grade point average (CGPA) of 3.56 out of 4, becoming the first public-sector university in Haryana to attain this distinction. In a first for Haryana State varsity, Kurukshetra University gets NAAC’s A++ grade | Chandigarh News - Times of India

=== Category-I Status ===
The university has been granted Category-I status, a designation associated with high-performing institutions and enhanced academic autonomy. This status allows greater flexibility in curriculum development, research initiatives, academic collaborations, and institutional governance.

=== Academic Affiliations ===
The university is recognized by the University Grants Commission and participates in national and international academic networks. It is also associated with organizations that facilitate academic cooperation and mobility.

== Achievements ==
=== Academic ===
The Department of Electronic Science in 2011, was awarded a ₹2.96 crore (US$310,000) project on nanoscience by Department of Science and Technology (DST), Government of India.

Kurukshetra University implemented the National Education Policy (NEP) 2020 in its undergraduate programmes from the 2022–23 session, becoming the first university in Haryana to do so. From July 2023, the policy was extended to all affiliated colleges.

=== Sports ===
Kurukshetra University, Kurukshetra has a number of achievements in sports. In 2015 the Boxing Team of Kurukshetra University won the All India Inter-University Boxing Championship among more than 100 Universities from all over India. All India Inter-University Boxing Championship was held at LPU, Jalandhar. Boxers from KUK won 3 Gold and 3 Bronze Medals under their boxing coach Rajesh Kumar Rajound. The university has been awarded Maulana Abul Kalam Azad (MAKA) Trophy, representing the highest award given for inter-university sports and University sportsperson performance in international and national arena by the Government of India, in the year 1966–1967. Kurukshetra University, Kurukshetra won first position in Archery (Women), Basketball (Women), and Karate (Men) at the All India Inter-University tournaments during the 2024–25 session. Kurukshetra University, Kurukshetra has a number of achievements in sports. In 2015 the Boxing Team of Kurukshetra University won the All India Inter-University Boxing Championship among more than 100 Universities from all over India.

== Campus ==
Spread over 473 acres (1.91 km^{2}), the KUK campus is located on the western bank of Brahma Sarovar in the Hindu holy city of Kurukshetra.

== Faculties ==
- Faculty of Arts & Languages
- Faculty of Social Sciences
- Faculty of Life Sciences
- Faculty of Science
- Faculty of Commerce & Management
- Faculty of Education
- Faculty of Engg. & Technology
- Faculty of Indic Studies
- Faculty of Law

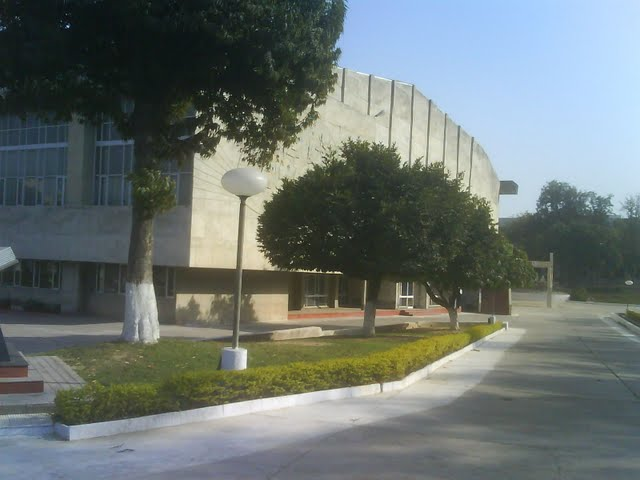
Auditorium of Kurukshetra University.

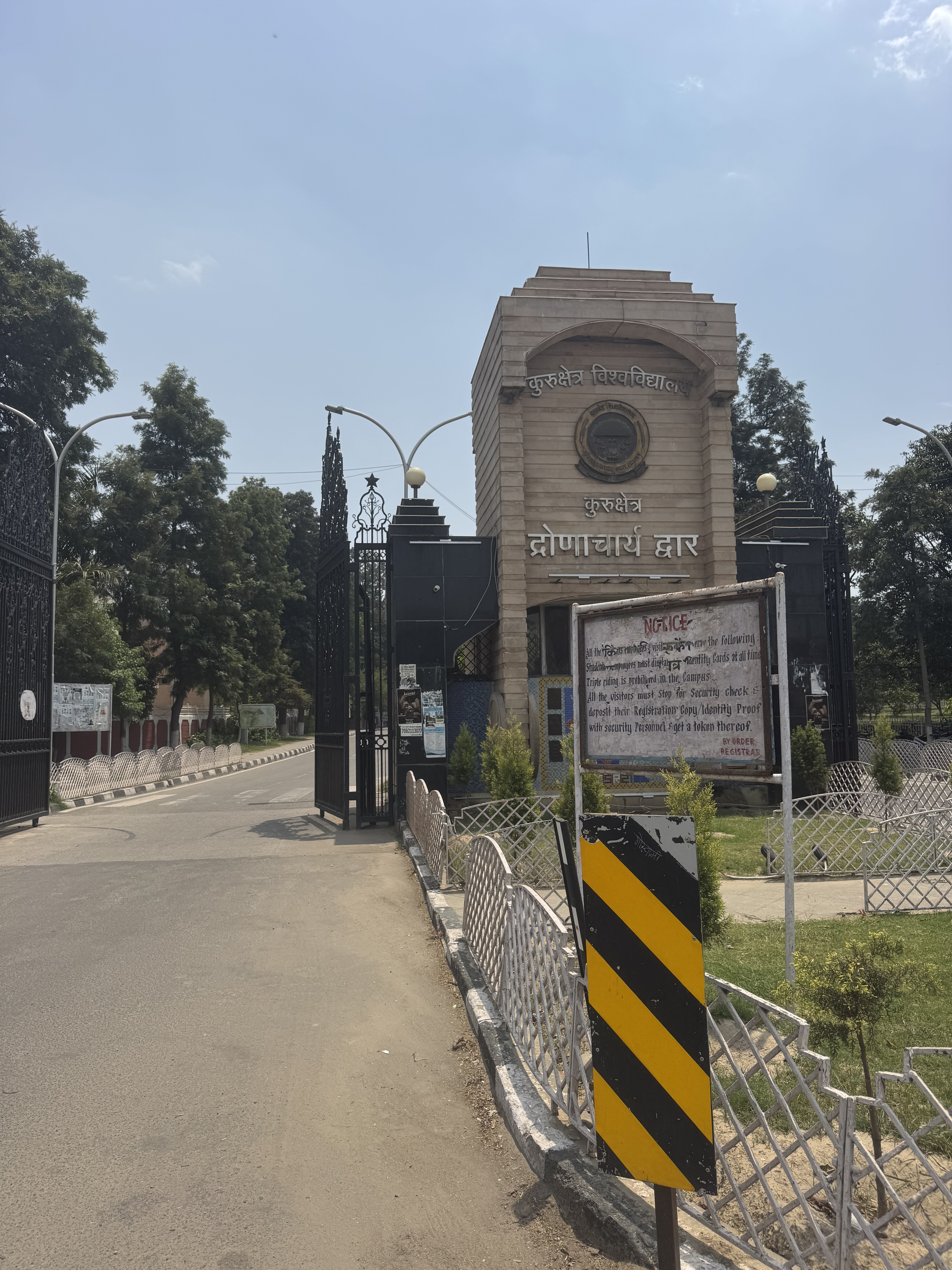
Dronacharya Dwar of Kurukshetra University: Left gate (Entry gate)

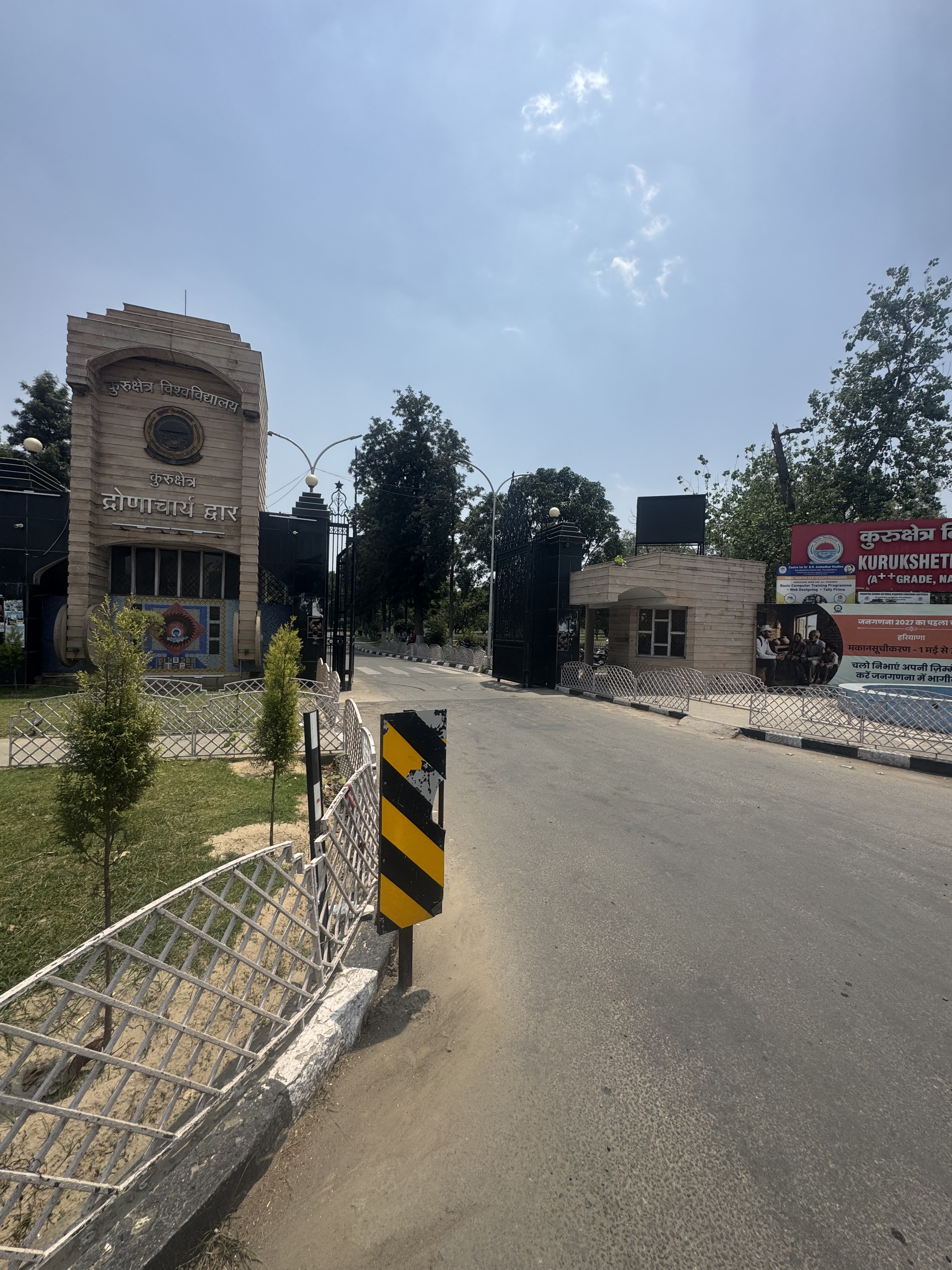
Dronacharya Dwar of Kurukshetra University: Right gate (Exit gate)

== Institution ==
=== Centre of excellence (CoE) ===
- Centre of excellence for research on Saraswati river:
  Geoscientific research on palaeochannels and drainage basin
- Centre for advance research in earthquake studies:
  Seismic hazard map and 24x7 seismic monitoring of Haryana
- Centre for applied biology in environment sciences:
  Research on climate change and pollution
- Centre for information technology and automation:
  Research on big data and business analytics
- Centre for advanced material research:
  Ion beam centre to research on functional molecules, optical materials and nanostructures

=== Departments / Institutes / Centres ===
The university has 10 faculties and 49 departments / institutes / schools:

- Centre for Distance & Online Education
- Department of Arts and Languages
- Department of Foreign Languages
- Department of Chemistry
- Department of Geology
- Department of Geophysics
- Department of Life Sciences
- Department of Pharmaceutical Sciences
- Department of Physics
- Department of Statistics
- Department of Law
- Institute of Indic Studies
- Institute of Integrated and Honors Studies (Formerly University College)
- Institute of Teachers Training & Research
- Institute of Environmental studies
- Institute of Management Studies
- Institute of Mass Communication & Media Technology
- University Institute of Engineering and Technology
- University School of Management
- University Senior Secondary Model School

=== Affiliated colleges ===
Its jurisdiction extends over 7 districts- Ambala, Kaithal, Karnal, Kurukshetra, Panchkula, Panipat, Yamunanagar. The university has 290 affiliated colleges and institutes.

== Rankings ==
University rankings

Engineering – India
- NIRF (2024): 201-300

The National Institutional Ranking Framework (NIRF) ranked the university between 201-300 in the engineering rankings in 2024.

In the National Institutional Ranking Framework (NIRF) 2025, Kurukshetra University was ranked 35th among State Public Universities. It had previously been ranked 41st in 2024 in the same category.

== Notable alumni ==
- K. K. Aggarwal
- Vishva Nath Attri
- Satish Babu
- Suraj Bhan
- Ajay Singh Chautala
- Sunil Dabas
- Bhim S. Dahiya
- Pema Dhondup
- Ramakant Goswami
- Rajendra Gupta
- Zakir Hussain (Haryana politician)
- Sunil Jaglan
- Virender Singh Kadian
- Naresh Kamboj
- Surya Kant (judge)
- Rattan Lal Kataria
- Amolak Rattan Kohli
- Nand Lal (academic)
- Anu Singh Lather
- Ishan Kumar Patro
- Dalel Singh Ror
- Jagjit Singh
- Rajbir Singh
- Mamta Sodha
- Naveen Soni

== See also ==
- List of institutions of higher education in Haryana
- State University of Performing And Visual Arts
- State Institute of Film and Television
