= Kurukshetra =

Historical region, and city in Haryana, India

Kurukshetra Dharmakshetra
- City
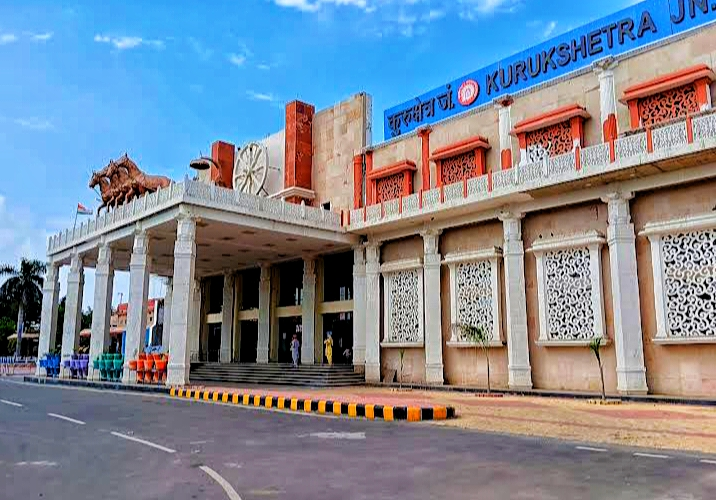
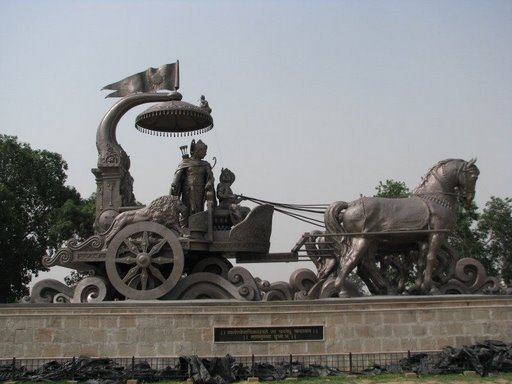
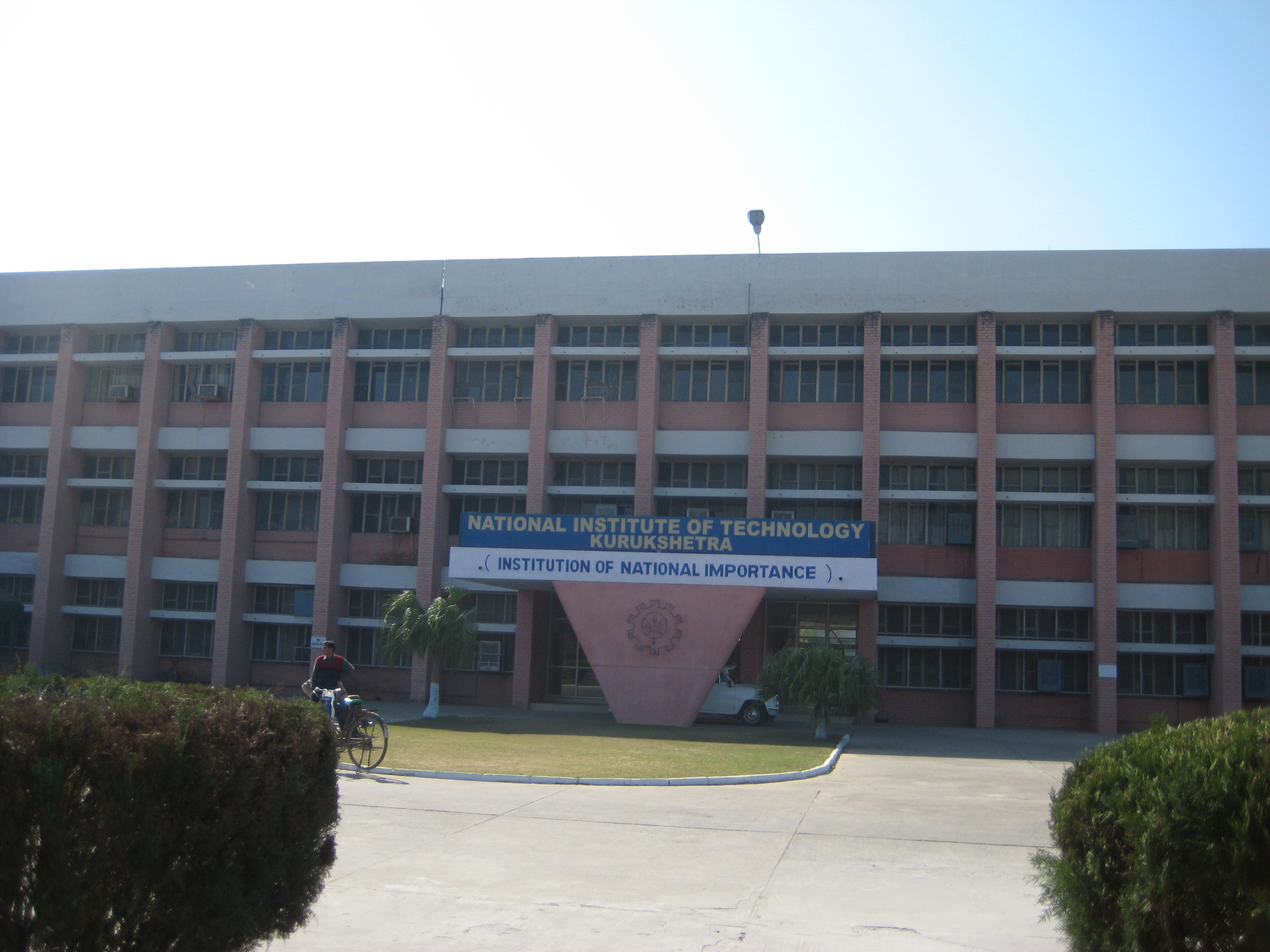
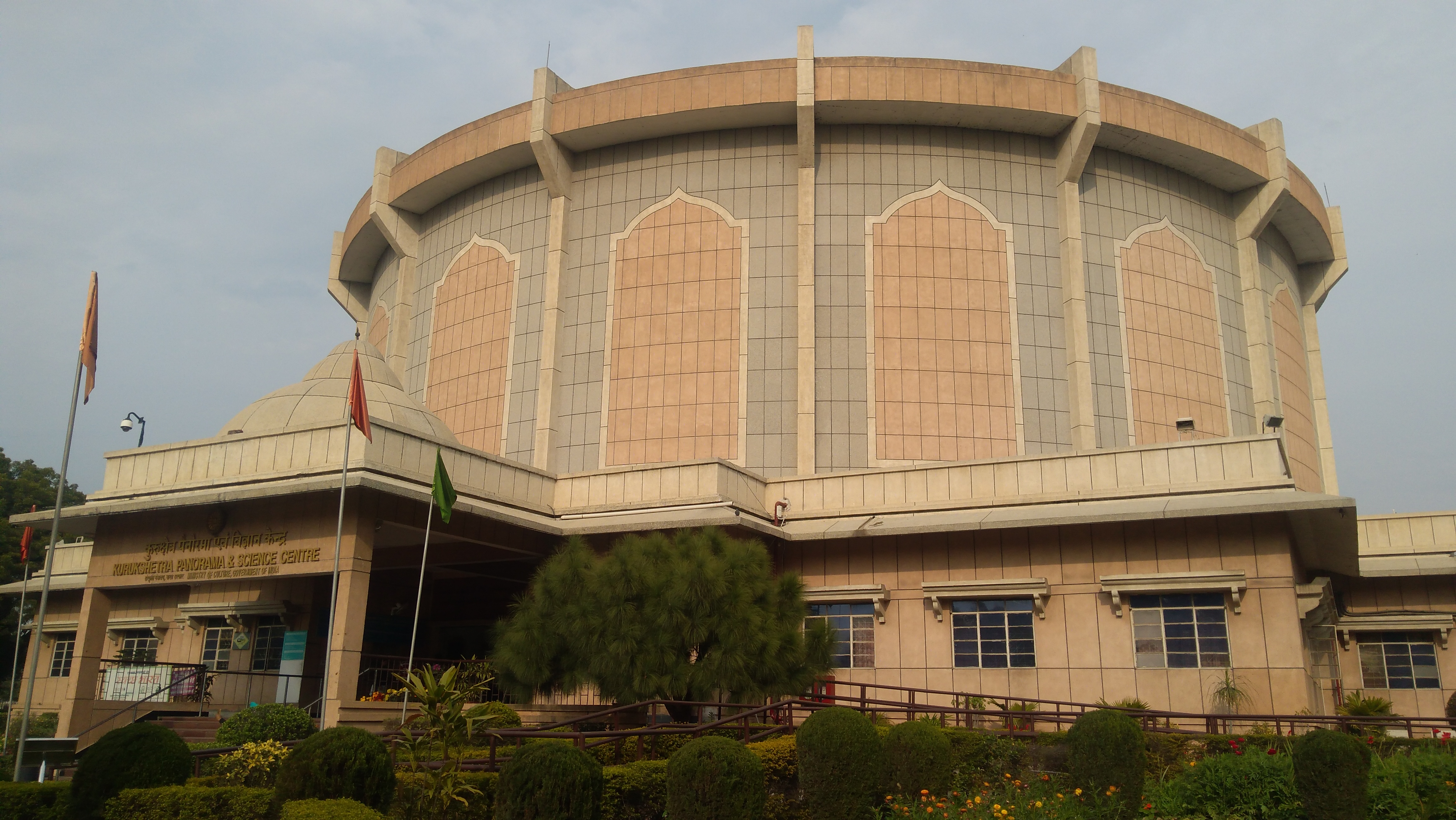
- Kurukshetra Junction Gita Updesh Bronze chariot with Shri Krishna and Arjuna in Kurukshetra NIT Kurukshetra Kurukshetra panorama and science center
- Nickname: Land of the Bhagavad Gita
- Interactive map of Kurukshetra
- Location within Haryana Location within India
- Coordinates: 29.965717°N 76.837006°E
- Country: India
- State: Haryana
- District: Kurukshetra
- Named for: King Kuru

Area
  - Total: 48 km^{2} (19 sq mi)

Languages
  - Official: Hindi
  - Regional: Haryanvi
- Time zone: UTC+5:30 (IST)
- PIN: 136118
- Telephone code: 01744
- ISO 3166 code: IN-HR
- Vehicle registration: HR-07
- Website: kurukshetra.gov.in

Kurukshetra (Hindi: kurukṣetra, pronounced [kʊrʊkʃeːtɾə]) is a historical region in India, also known as Dharmakshetra ("Realm of duty") and as the "Land of the Bhagavad Gita". It also refers to the city Kurukshetra, situated in the area and administrative headquarters of Kurukshetra district in the Indian state of Haryana.

== Legends ==
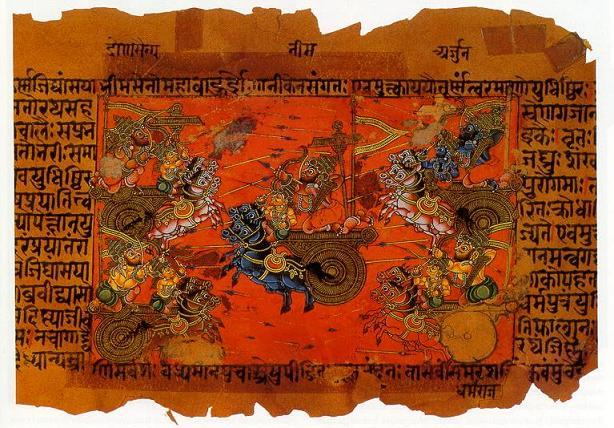
A manuscript of Mahabharata depicting the war at Kurukshetra

According to the Puranas, Kurukshetra is a region named after King Kuru, the ancestor of Kauravas and Pandavas in the Kuru kingdom, as depicted in epic Mahabharata. The Kurukshetra War of the Mahabharata is believed to have taken place here. Thaneswar, whose urban area is merged with Kurukshetra, is a pilgrimage site with many locations attributed to Mahabharata.

In the Vedas, Kurukshetra is described not as a city but as a region ("kshetra" means "region" in Sanskrit). The boundaries of Kurukshetra correspond roughly to the central and western parts of the state of Haryana and Punjab. According to the Taittiriya Aranyaka 5.1.1., the Kurukshetra region is south of Turghna (Srughna/Sugh in Sirhind, Punjab), north of Khandava (Delhi and Mewat region), east of Maru (desert), and west of Parin.

According to the Vamana Purana, King Kuru chose land at the banks of the Sarasvati River for embedding spirituality with eight virtues: austerity (Tapas), truth (Satya), forgiveness (Kshama), kindness (Daya), purity (Shuddha), charity (Daana), devotion (Yajna), and conduct (Brahmacharya). Lord Vishnu was impressed with the acts of King Kuru and blessed him with two boons—first, that this land forever will be known as a Holy Land after his name as Kurukshetra (the land of Kuru); second, that anyone dying on this land will go to heaven.

The land of Kurukshetra was situated between two rivers—the Sarasvati and the Drishadvati.

== History ==
Kuru kingdom, founded by King Puru—the ancestors of Kauravas and Pandavas Vedic Indo-Aryan tribal union in northern Iron Age (c. 1200 – c. 900 BCE), developed into the first recorded state-level society (janapada) in the Indian subcontinent. This kingdom documented their ritual hymns into collections called the Vedas, and developed new rituals which gained their position in Indian civilization as the Srauta rituals, which contributed to the "classical synthesis" or Hindu synthesis (roots of Hinduism). It was the dominant political and cultural center of the middle Vedic Period during the reigns of Parikshit and Janamejaya, but declined in importance during the late Vedic period (c. 900 – c. 500 BCE) and had become "something of a backwater" by the Mahajanapada period in the 5th century BCE. Traditions and legends about the Kurus continued into the post-Vedic period, providing the basis for the Mahabharata epic. The time-frame and geographical extent of the Kuru kingdom (as determined by philological study of the Vedic literature) corresponds with the archaeological Painted Grey Ware culture.

Kurukshetra was conquered by the Mauryan empire in the late 4th century BCE and subsequently became a center of Buddhism and Hinduism. The history of Kurukshetra is little-known in between the collapse of the Mauryans and the rise of the Kushans who conquered the region. After the decline of Kushan power in the region, Kurukshetra became independent only to become conquered by the Gupta empire in the early 4th century CE. Under Gupta rule, Kurukshetra experienced a cultural and religious revival and became a center for Hinduism. After the fall of the Gupta, the Pushyabhuti dynasty ruled over Kurukshetra.

Kurukshetra reached the zenith of its progress during the reign of King Harsha (c. 590–647 CE) during which Chinese scholar Xuanzang visited Thanesar. Civil war broke out when Harsha (of the Pushyabhuti dynasty) died without a successor in 647. A Kashmiri army briefly conquered Kurukshetra in 733 but were unable to establish dominion in the area. In 736, the Tomara dynasty was founded and they took over the region. Around the early 9th century, Kurukshetra lost its independence to Bengal. Mahmud of Ghazni sacked Kurukshetra in 1014 and Muslim raiders sacked it in 1034. Kurukshetra was incorporated into the Delhi Sultanate in 1206. Other than a short moment of independence from the result of a rebellion within the Sultanate in 1240, Kurukshetra was under the control of Delhi until 1388.

Kurukshetra became independent once again after the steep decline of the Delhi Sultanate and the raids of Tamerlane near the region. The Sayyid dynasty incorporated Kurukshetra into their territory though the city likely enjoyed some autonomy. The area was much more firmly controlled under the subsequent Lodi dynasty. Some damages to Kurukshetra and its structures occurred during this period. Kurukshetra became part of the Mughal Empire after Babur quashed a local rebellion in 1526. Under Akbar, Kurukshetra once again became a spiritual center not only for Hindus but also for Sikhs and Muslims.

Between the late 17th and early 18th centuries, Kurukshetra was controlled by the forces of the Maratha Empire until the British took over Delhi in 1803. In 1805, the British took Kurukshetra after defeating the Maratha forces in the Second Anglo-Maratha War, who were controlling the city. Since 1947, Kurukshetra has become a popular spiritual center and has seen much infrastructure, development, and restoration of old structures.

== Geography ==
Kuruksetra is located at around 30° North and 77° East.

Kurukshetra city is surrounded by Patiala, Ludhiana, Jalandhar, Amritsar to the northwest, Ambala, Chandigarh, Shimla to the north, Yamuna Nagar, Jagadhri, Dehradun to the northeast, Pehowa, Cheeka, Mansa to the west, Ladwa, Saharanpur, Roorkee to the east, Kaithal, Jind, Hisar to the southwest, Karnal, Panipat, Sonipat, New Delhi to the south, and Shamli, Muzaffarnagar, Meerut to the southeast.

=== Climate ===
The climate of the district varies as the temperature in summer reaches as high as 47 °C (117 °F), and as low 1 °C (34 °F) in winter, with rains in July and August.

== Demography ==
Religion in Kurukshetra city (2011)
1. Hinduism (83.5%)
2. Sikhism (14.6%)
3. Islam (1.66%)
4. Christianity (0.20%)
5. Other/Not Stated (0.12%)

In 2017, the government declared Kurukshetra a holy city and the sale, possession, and consumption of meat are banned within the limits of the Municipal Corporation due to its religious significance.

== Transport ==
Kurukshetra Junction railway station is a junction station at the junction of Delhi–Kalka line and Kurukshetra–Jind branch line. It serves Kurukshetra and Thanesar city.

== Tourism ==
Kurukshetra is an important Hindu pilgrimage destination, and there are several pilgrimage sites surrounding the city. The Hindi phrase 48 kos parikrama refers to a roughly 90-km traditional circle (Parikrama) around the holy city (1 kos equals about 3.00 km or 1.91 miles), and a complete parikrama refers to a pilgrimage to all these sites on foot. The International Gita Mahotsav, held every year in Kururukshetra on the Shukla Ekadashi—the 11th day of the waxing moon of the Margashirsha (Agrahayan) month of the Hindu calendar, celebrates the day Bhagavad Gita was revealed to Arjuna by Krishna in the battlefield of Kurukshetra.

=== Hindu religious sites ===
- Brahma Sarovar: Every year lakhs (hundreds of thousands) of people come to take a holy bath at Brahma Sarovar on the occasion of "Somavati Amavasya" (Sacred No-Moon Day that happens on a Monday) and on solar eclipses. They believe that a bath in the holy Sarovar frees all sins and cycle of birth-death. The Sarovar is one of Asia's largest man-made ponds. Hindu genealogy registers are kept here.
- Sannihit Sarovar: The pond is believed to be the meeting point of seven sacred Saraswatis. The Sarovar, according to popular belief, contains sacred water. Bathing in the waters of the tank on the day of Amavasya (night of complete darkness) or on the day of an eclipse bestows blessings equivalent to performing the Ashvamedh Yajna.
- Jyotisar: The famous site where Bhagavad Gita was delivered to Arjuna under the tree. The tree of that time is witness to Gita.
- Sthaneshwar Mahadev Temple

=== Museums ===
- Kurukshetra Panorama and Science Centre: A mural depiction of the Mahabharata war.
- Dharohar Museum: A museum about the tradition and cultural depiction of Haryana located in Kurukshetra University.

=== Historical sites ===
- Sheikh Chilli's Tomb: This monument is maintained by the Archaeological Survey of India. It was built during the Mughal era in remembrance of Sufi Saint Sheikh Chehli, believed to be the spiritual teacher of Mughal Prince Dara Shikoh. The Prince's main 'Murshid' or 'Sheikh' (Spiritual Guide), however, is historically known to have been Hazrat Sheikh Mian Mir Sahib, of Lahore, although Sheikh Chehli might have been an additional teacher. Another theory is that the site of the so-called maqbara or tomb. Sheikh Chaheli’s Tomb and the madarasa are associated with the Sufi saint Abdu'r-Rahim alias Aabd-ul-Razak, popularly known as Shaikh Chehli (also pronounced Chilli).
- The Pathar Masjid is built of red sandstone and is known for its fluted minaret.
- Nabha House, a palatial building was constructed by the royal family of Nabha principality.
- Bhai Lakhi Shah Banjara Baoli at Ishargarh, 7 km north of Pipli bus stand on NH-44 GT Road, was constructed by Bhai Lakhi Rai Banjara. See also Stepwells of Haryana.

== Wildlife ==
- Crocodile Breeding Centre, Kurukshetra
- Chhilchhila Wildlife Sanctuary
- Saraswati Wildlife Sanctuary

== Educational institutes ==
- Kurukshetra University
- National Institute of Design
- National Institute of Technology, Kurukshetra
- Shri Krishna AYUSH University
- University Institute of Engineering and Technology, Kurukshetra University
- State Institute of Advance Studies in Teacher Education, Kurukshetra
- Govt. Polytechnic, Umri
- National Institute of Electronics & Information Technology, Kurukshetra

== Politics ==
- Naveen Jindal is the current Member of Parliament in 18th Lok Sabha for Kurukshetra. Previously, Nayab Singh Saini was the Member of Parliament in 17th Lok Sabha who is currently serving as the Chief Minister of Haryana.

== District administration ==
- The Deputy Commissioner, an officer belonging to the Indian Administrative Service, is in charge of the General Administration in the district. He is assisted by a number of officers belonging to Haryana Civil Service and other Haryana state services.
- The Superintendent of Police, an officer belonging to the Indian Police Service, is responsible for maintaining Law & Order and related issues in the district. He is assisted by the officers of the Haryana Police Service and other Haryana Police officials.
- The Deputy Conservator of Forests, an officer belonging to the Indian Forest Service, is responsible for the management of the Forests, Environment, and Wildlife in the district. He is assisted by the officers of the Haryana Forest Service and other Haryana Forest officials and Haryana Wildlife officials.
- Sectoral development is looked after by the district head/officer of each development department such as PWD, Health, Education, Agriculture, Animal Husbandry, Statistics, etc. These officers are from various Haryana state services.
- Shahbad, Ladwa, Pehowa, Babain, Ismailabad, and Jhansa are other towns in the district with significant populations.

== In popular culture ==
Ramdhari Singh 'Dinkar' wrote an epic poem titled Kurukshetra, a narrative poem based on the Santi Parva of the Mahabharata. He wrote the poem when memories of the Second World War were fresh in his mind.

== Notable people ==
- Nayab Singh Saini, Chief Minister of Haryana
- Dr. Pawan Saini, doctor, academician, social activist and former MLA of Ladwa
- Raj Kumar Saini, former Member of Parliament from Kurukshetra of 16th Lok Sabha
- Sandeep Singh Saini, former captain of Indian Hockey team, current MLA from Pehowa and Sports Minister of Haryana
- Kailasho Devi Saini, politician and former Member of Parliament
- Surinder Kaur, Hockey player and member of the national field hockey team
- Rohit Sardana, journalist, anchor and media personality
- Sanjay Chaudhary, HUM Foundation, Social Activist

== Gallery ==
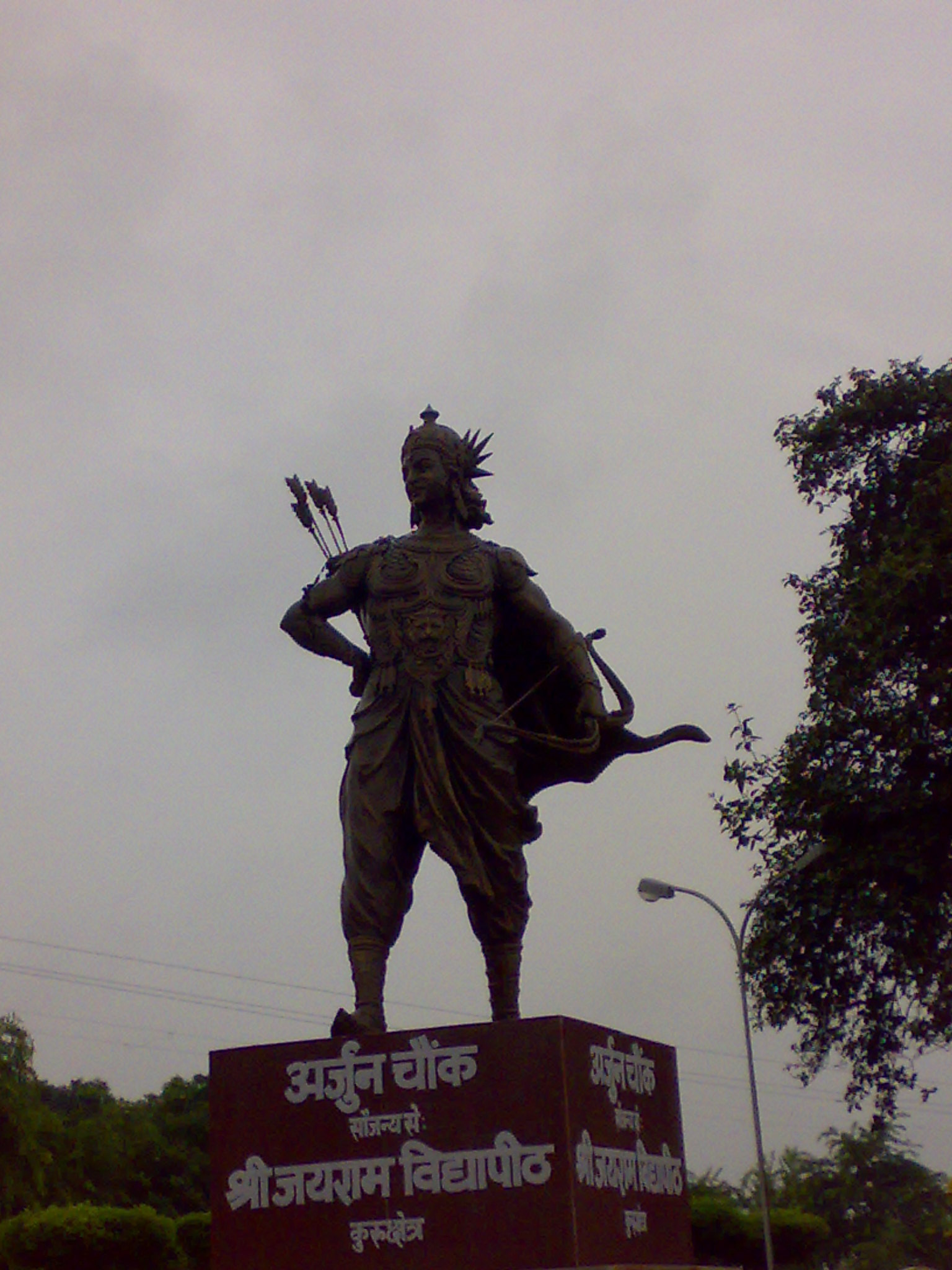
The statue of Arjun at the Arjun Chowk

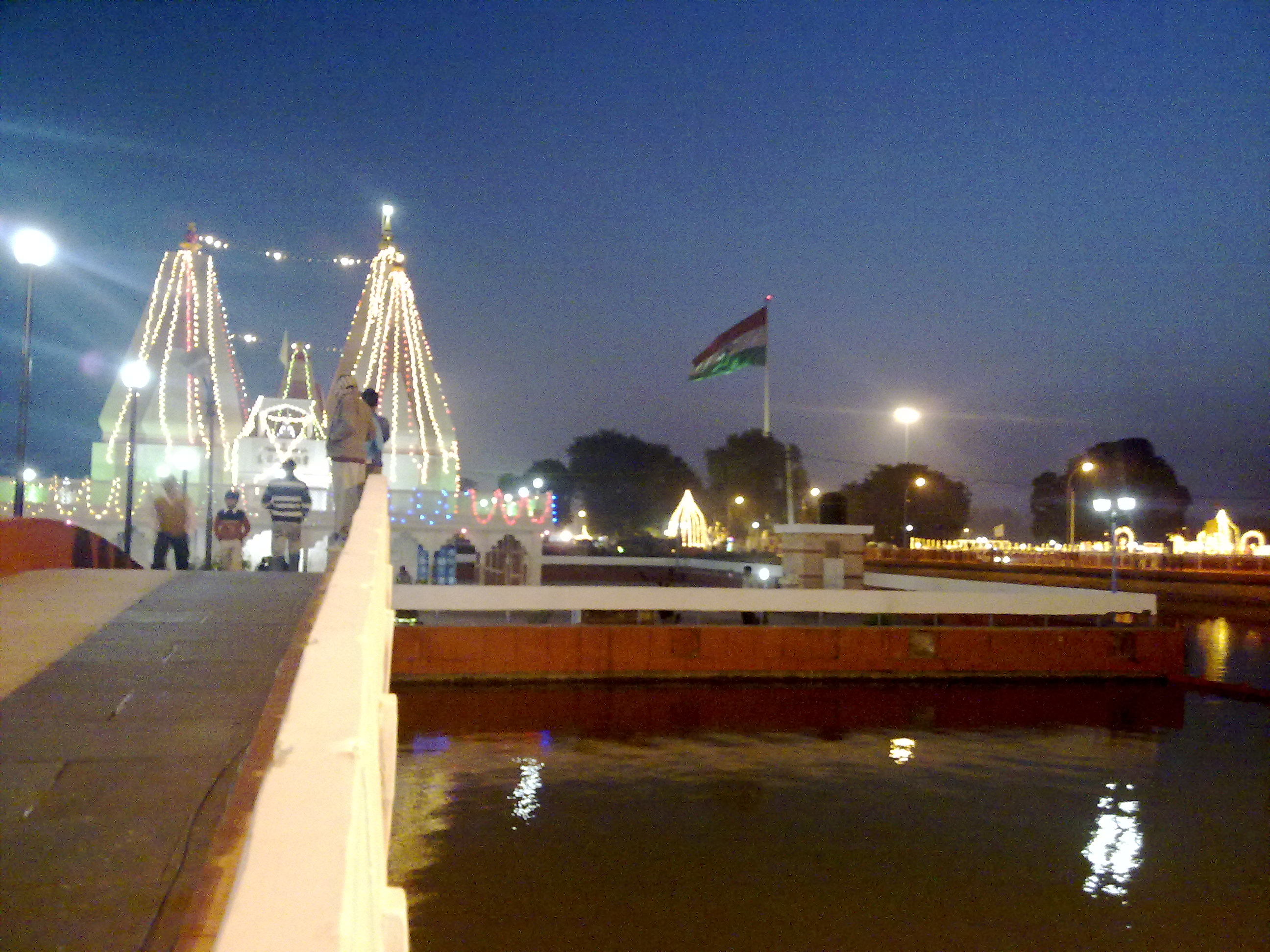
Brahma Sarovar

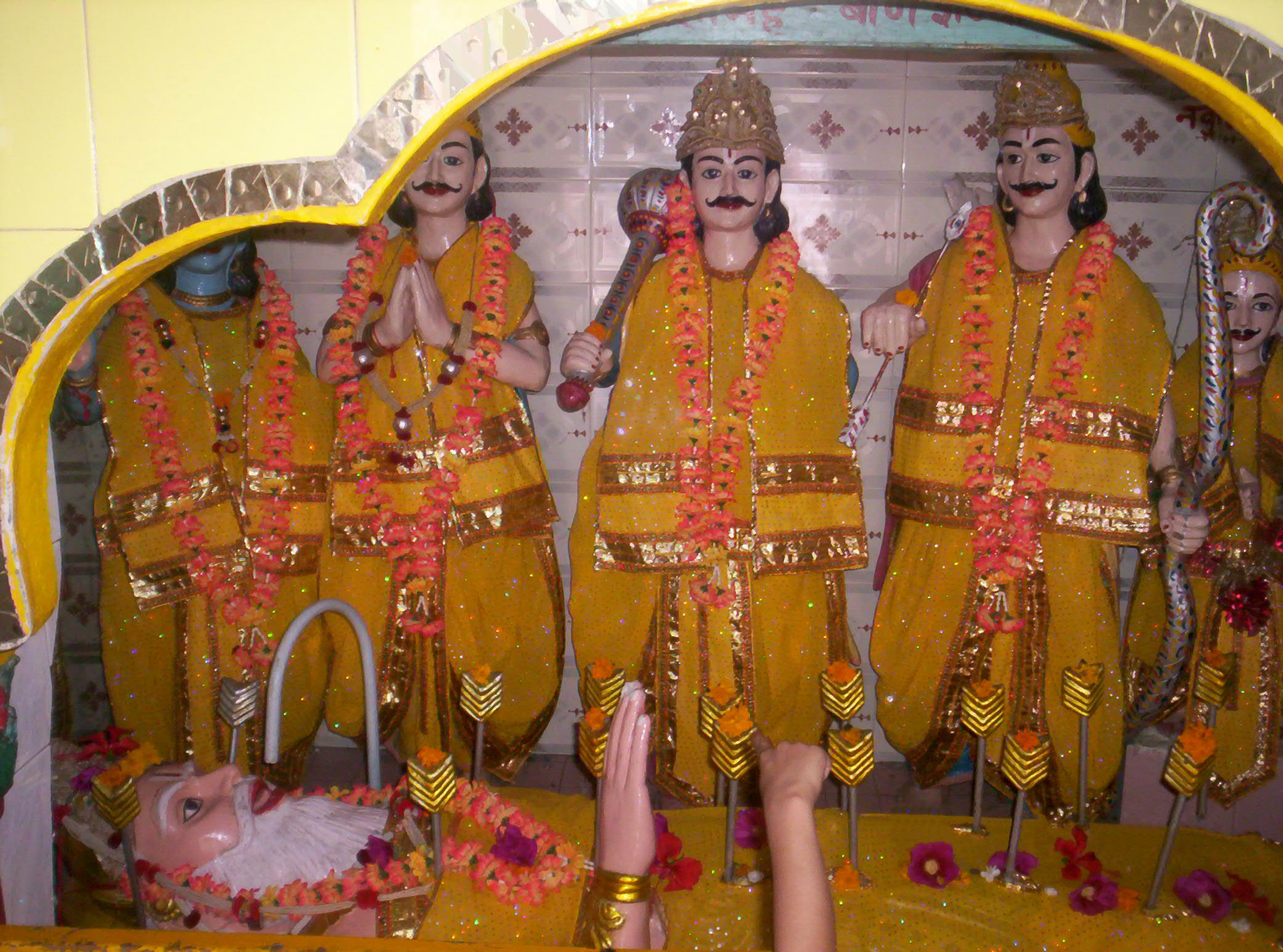
Bhishma Kund

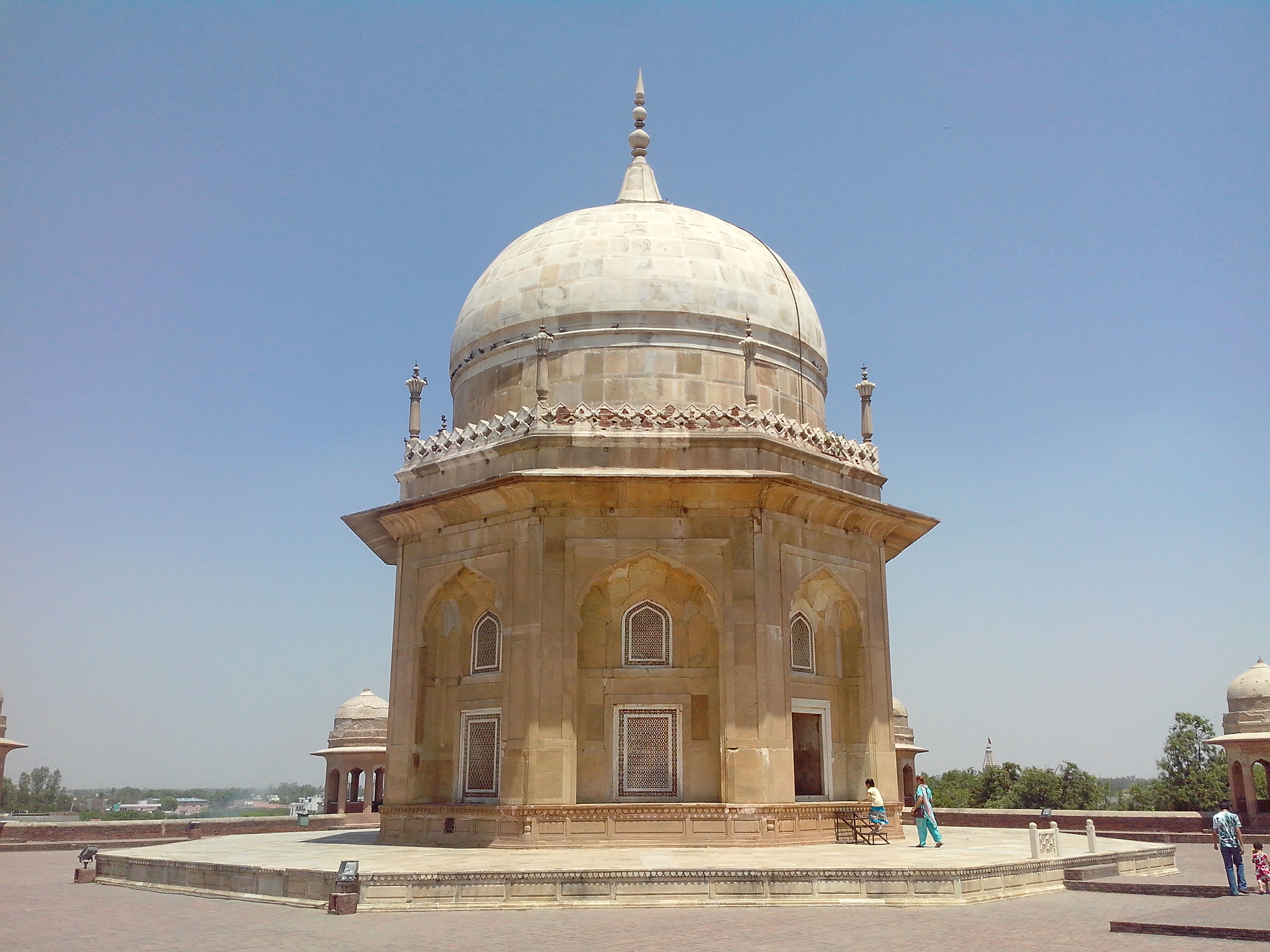
Sheikh Chilli Tomb

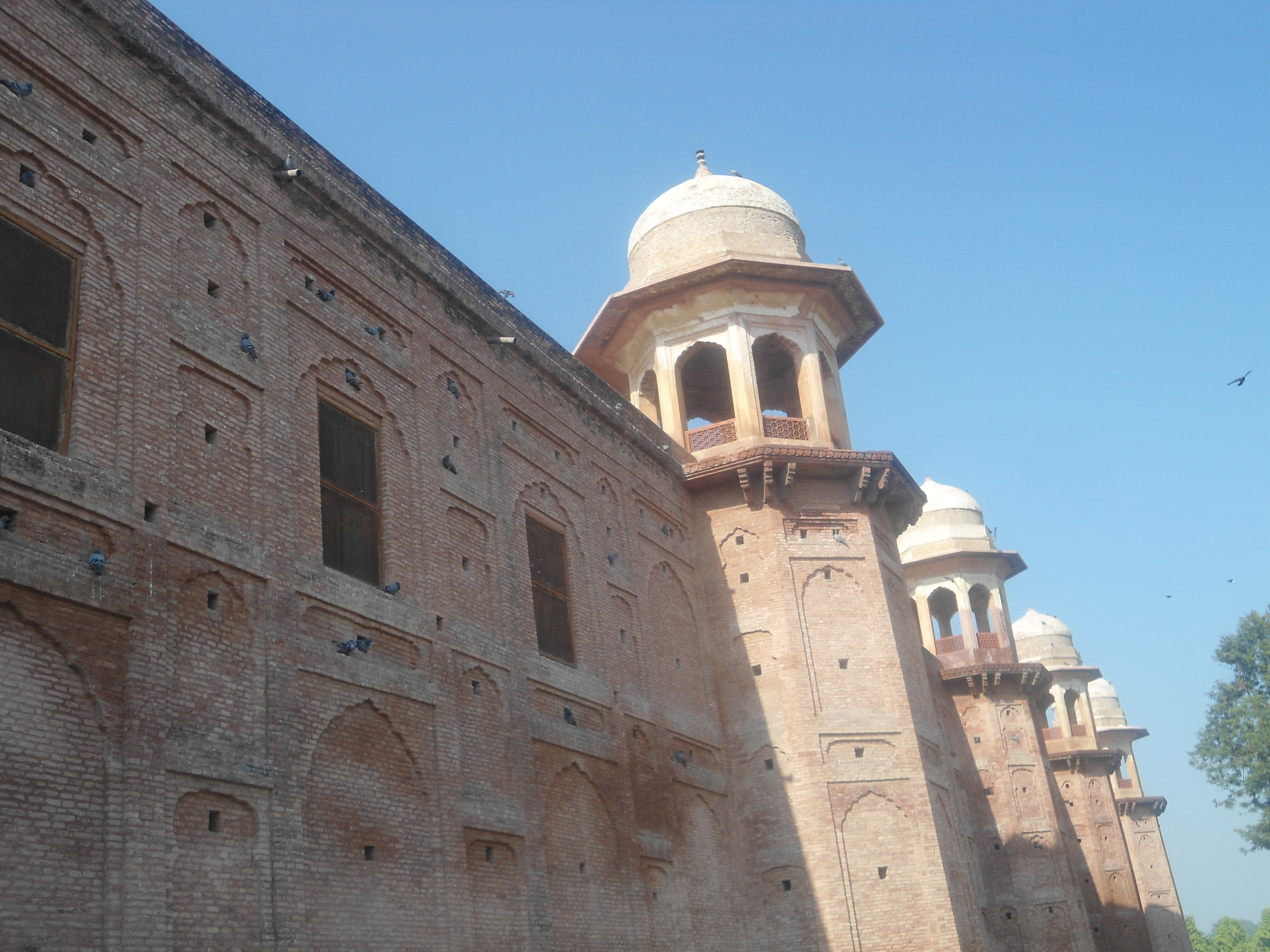
Sheikh Chilli Maqbara.

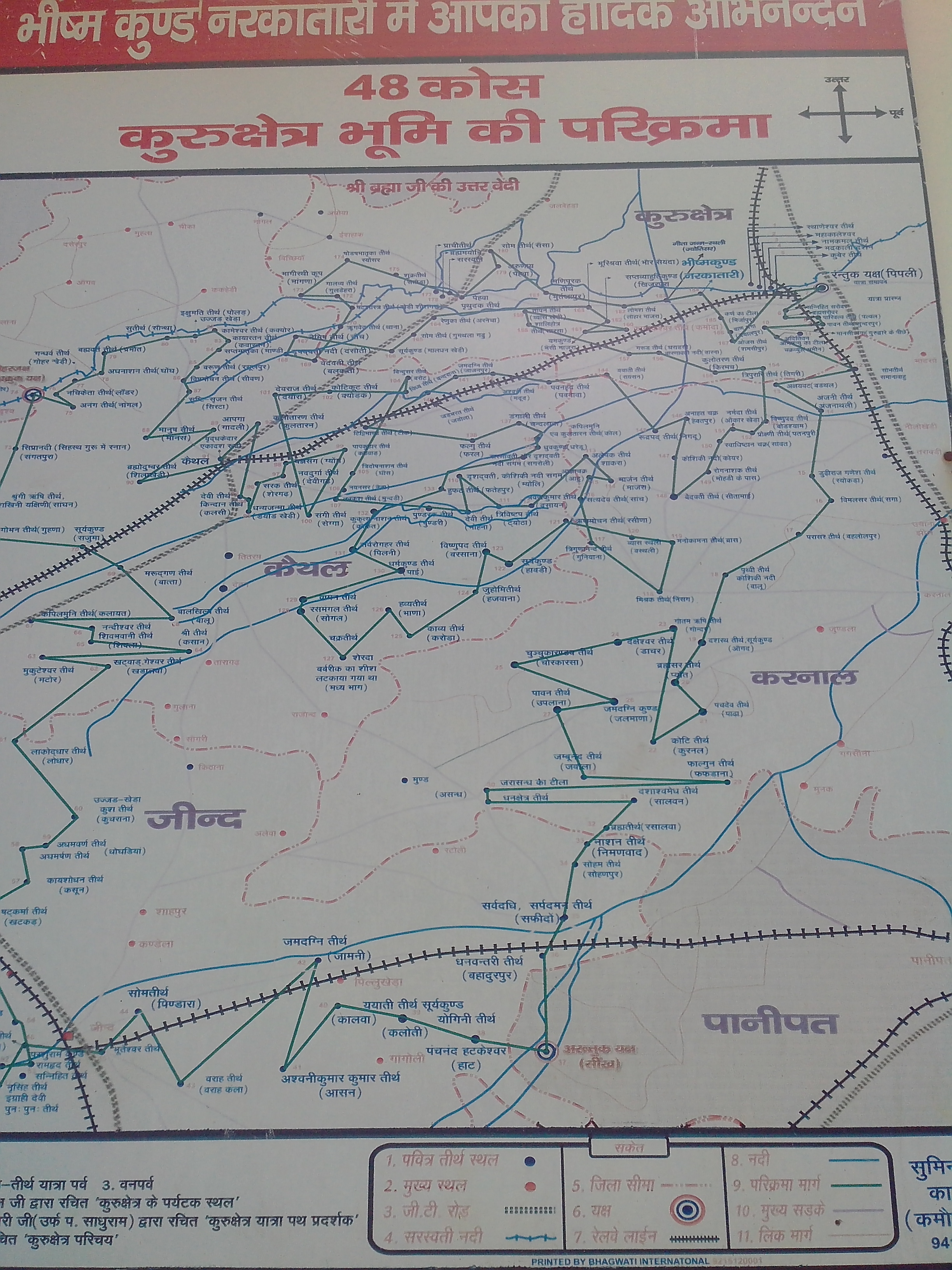
Map depicting all the 48 kos parikrama sites displayed at Ban Ganga/Bhishma Kund

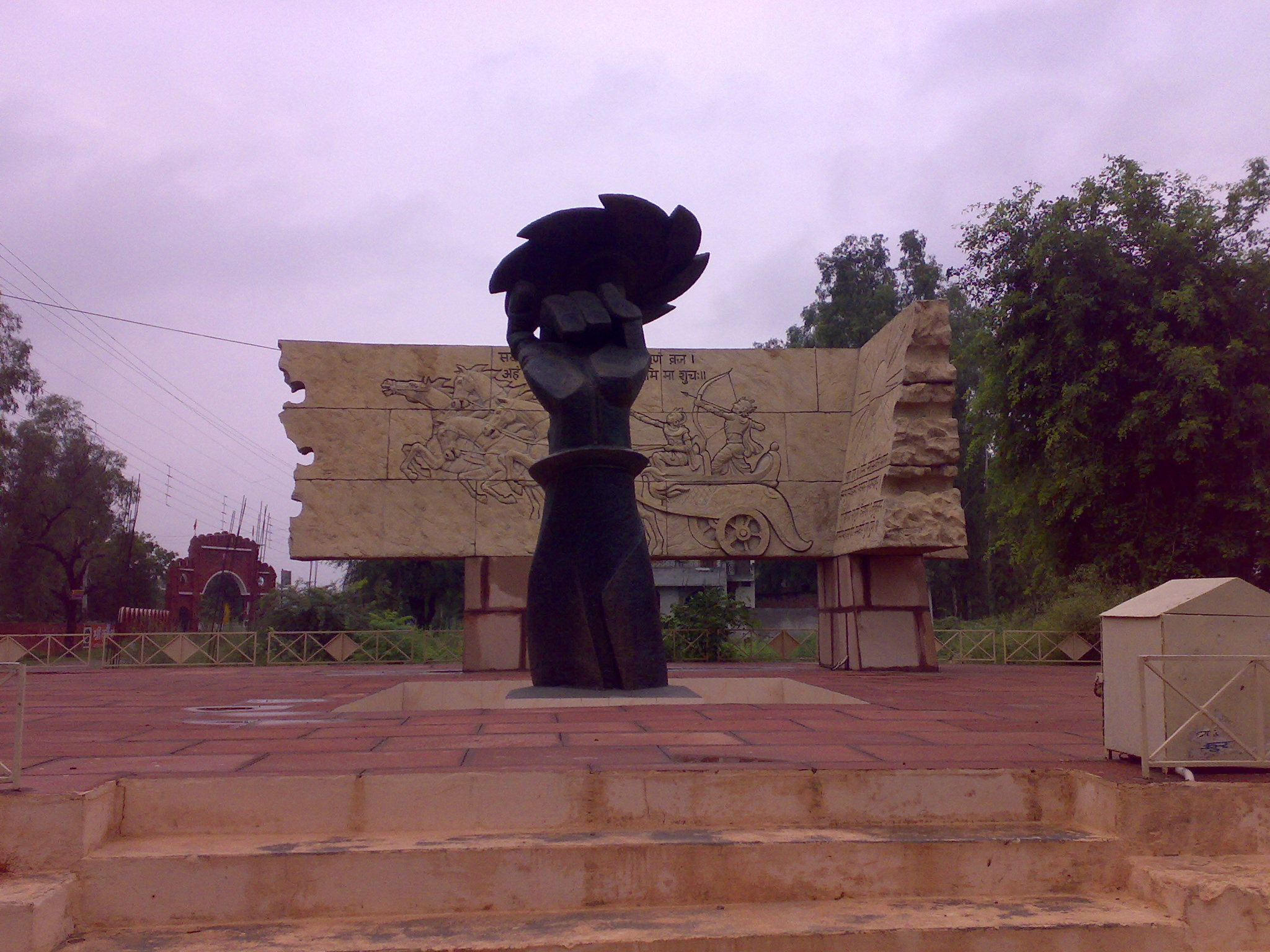
Sudarshan Chakra Chowk near NIT

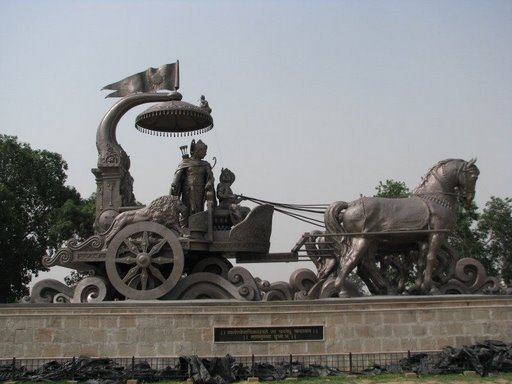
Bronze Chariot with Lord Krishna and Arjuna in Kurukshetra

== Sources ==
- Hiltebeitel, Alf (2002), Hinduism. In: Joseph Kitagawa, "The Religious Traditions of Asia: Religion, History, and Culture", Routledge, ISBN 9781136875977, archived from the original on 11 January 2023
- Pletcher, Kenneth (2010), The History of India, The Rosen Publishing Group, ISBN 9781615301225, archived from the original on 9 April 2024
- Samuel, Geoffrey (2010), The Origins of Yoga and Tantra. Indic Religions to the Thirteenth Century, Cambridge University Press
- Witzel, Michael (1990), "On Indian Historical Writing" (PDF), Journal of the Japanese Association for South Asian Studies, 2: 1–57, archived (PDF) from the original on 8 December 2021
- Witzel, Michael (1995), "Early Sanskritization: Origin and Development of the Kuru state" (PDF), EJVS, 1 (4), archived from the original (PDF) on 11 June 2007
