= Cheeka =

- Town
- Location in Haryana, India Cheeka (India)
- Coordinates: 30.04770°N 76.33395°E
- Country: India
- State: Haryana
- District: Kaithal

Government
  - Body: Municipal Committee

Population (2011)
  - Total: 38,952

Languages
  - Official: Hindi
- Time zone: UTC+5:30 (IST)
- PIN: 136034
- Telephone code: 01743
- ISO 3166 code: IN-HR
- Vehicle registration: HR-09
- Website: haryana.gov.in

Cheeka is a town in the state of Haryana.

== Demographics ==
As of 2011 India census, Cheeka had a population of 38,952. Males constitute 20,610 of the population and females 18,342 with 13% of the population is under 6 years of age. Cheeka has an average literacy rate of 75.18%, lower than the national average of 75.55%; with male literacy of 81.87% and female literacy of 67.75%.

== Background ==
Cheeka is a big hub of businesses like rice mills and marble shops. Known as the marble city of Haryana, around 60 marble shops ply in the city. Cheeka grain market is one of the busiest markets of Haryana. Cheeka serves as a local trade hub serving the local residents as well as the people of nearby areas.

== Education ==
The people of Cheeka have experienced changes in education in Cheeka over the years. Previously only Government schools were there to serve students of Cheeka. Now private schools have emerged in Cheeka. This alleviated some parent's criticisms of the governmental education system. But still there is lack of teachers in science area. For higher education, D.A.V College and ITI are in Cheeka, Kaithal district sharing a campus with one another. Some students still attend other colleges in nearby cities.

However Cheeka has also produced IAS and IPS officers. A lot of students from Cheeka have qualified the prestigious exams like JEE and NEET.

Schools: The Indian Heights International School, GGSS School, GBSS School, DAV Sr Sec Public School, AV Vidyamandir Sr Sec Public School, Kohinoor International Academy, KS Grewal Sr Sec Public School, Mother's Pride Public School, Xavier's International School, SD School, Gyan Deep School, Green Fields Public, Millennium World School.

== Medical facilities ==
To serve the patients, many government and private hospitals ply in the city. Cheeka has a lot of medical facilities. But it lacks higher facilities such as a cardiac hospital, cancer hospital, etc. People have to approach cities like Kaithal and Patiala for higher medical facilities.
