= Nand Lal (academic) =

Vice chancellor of Sri Sri University

Personal details
- Born: Haryana
- Education: Kurukshetra University
- Profession: Professor Scientist

Dr. Nand Lal is the current vice chancellor of Sri Sri University. Before joining Sri Sri University, he was dean at Faculty of Science and also the dean of research and development, Kurukshetra University.

== Career ==
He studied at Kurukshetra University, Haryana for his BSc (Hons) in physics, M.Sc. in physics and Ph.D. in physics. He is a specialist in Nuclear Geophysics and Solid Earth Physics

== Projects and training ==
- He received grants from Department of law and Technology, Government of India
- He has presided over several national and international training programmes.

== Media coverage ==
- Dr R Seetharaman receives his doctorate degree in "Green Banking and Sustainability" from Sri Sri University vice chancellor Dr Nand Lal
- KU gets funds to develop research facility
