= Pisanu Harnkhomtun =

Thai volleyball player (born 1986)

Personal information
- Full name: Cha Akat Ek Pisanu Harnkhomtun
- Nickname: Peck
- Born: May 1, 1986 (age 40); Khon Kaen, Thailand
- Height: 1.94 m (6 ft 4 in)
- Weight: 78 kg (172 lb)

Volleyball information
- Position: Middle Blocker

National team
2007–2010	Thailand
Honours
Men's volleyball
Representing Thailand
Southeast Asian Games
Silver medal – second place	2009 Vientiane	Team

Pisanu Harnkhomtun (Thai: พิษณุ หารคำตัน, born 3 May 1986) is a member of the Thailand men's national volleyball team.

== Career ==
Pisanu played with the club Khonkaen E-Sarn University in 2011. He won the 2010-11 Thailand League Best Middle Blocker award. He is a coach assistant with Air Force in 2017.

== Clubs ==
=== As a volleyball player ===
- (Thailand) Nakhon Ratchasima (2010–2011)
- (Thailand) Khonkaen E-Sarn University (2011)
- (Thailand) Nakhon Ratchasima (2013–2014)
- (Thailand) Chonburi E-Tech Air Force (2014–2016)
- (Thailand) Ratchaburi (2016–2017)
- (Thailand) Air Force (2019–2020)

=== As a coach assistant ===
- (Thailand) Air Force (2017–2018)

== Awards ==
=== Individual ===
- 2010 Thailand League "Best Middle Blocker"

=== Clubs ===
- 2014 Thai–Denmark Super League - Runner-up, with Nakhon Ratchasima
- 2015 Thai–Denmark Super League - Champion, with Chonburi
- 2015–16 Thailand League - 3rd place, with Chonburi E-Tech Air Force
- 2016–17 Thailand League - Bronze Medal, with Ratchaburi
- 2017–18 Thailand League - Champion, with Air Force
- 2019 Thai–Denmark Super League - Runner-Up, with Air Force
