= Khanit Sinlapasorn =

Thai volleyball player (born 1994)

Personal information
- Full name: Khanit Sinlapasorn
- Nickname: Bo
- Born: 12 July 1994 (age 32); Sisaket, Thailand
- Height: 1.93 m (6 ft 4 in)
- Weight: 79 kg (174 lb)

Volleyball information
- Position: Outside hitter

National team
2013–2015	Thailand
Honours
Men's volleyball
Representing Thailand
Southeast Asian Games
Gold medal – first place	2015 Singapore	Team

Khanit Sinlapasor (Thai: คณิต ศิลปศร, born 12 July 1994) is a member of the Thailand men's national volleyball team.

== Clubs ==
- (Thailand) Chonburi E-Tech Air Force (2012–2016)
- (Thailand) NK Fitness Samutsakhon (2016–2017)
- (Thailand) Air Force (2017–2018)
- (Thailand) Air Force (2019–2020)

== Awards ==
=== Clubs ===
- 2012–13 Thailand League - Bronze Medal, with Chonburi
- 2013–14 Thailand League - Runner-up, with Chonburi
- 2014–15 Thailand League - Runner-up, with Chonburi E-Tech Air Force
- 2014 Thai-Denmark Super League - Champion, with Chonburi VC
- 2015 Thai-Denmark Super League - Champion, with Chonburi VC
- 2015–16 Thailand League - 3rd place, with Chonburi E-Tech Air Force
- 2017 Thai-Denmark Super League - Bronze Medal, with NK Fitness Samutsakhon
