= 2020–21 Men's Volleyball Thailand League =

Season of Thai men's professional volleyball

2020 Men's Volleyball Thailand League
- Dates: 12 November 2020 – 28 March 2021
- Teams: 8
- Venue: (in 2 host cities)

Tournament statistics
- Matches played: 56 (Regular seasons); 4 (Final series)

The 2020–21 Men's Volleyball Thailand League is the 16th season of the Men's Volleyball Thailand League, the top Thai professional league for men's volleyball clubs. It was established in 2005 and is also known as Daikin Men's Volleyball Thailand League due to the sponsorship deal with Daikin. A total of eight teams will compete in the league. The season began on 12 November 2020 and is scheduled to conclude in 2021. This season will be organized by the Thailand Volleyball Association (TVA) instead of Thailand Volleyball Co., Ltd. COVID-19 has spread to Thailand which affects the sporting seasons.

== Teams ==
Eight teams compete in the league – the top six teams from the previous season and the two teams promoted from the Pro Challenge. The promoted teams are Samut Prakan VC and Rangsit University. Rangsit University retains its position after relegation in previous season, while Samut Prakan VC reaches a top division for the first time. Samut Prakan VC replaced Opart 369 (relegated after four years in the top division) and this is the comeback of Samut Prakan VC for seven years before play in Thailand league.

=== Qualified teams ===
League positions of the previous season shown in parentheses (TH: Thailand League title holders; SL: Supur League title holders).

Qualified teams for 2019–20 Volleyball Thailand League (by entry round) Regular seasons
Team	From
Air Force (4th)	Bangkok
Diamond Food VC (2nd)	Saraburi
Koh-Kood Cabana (6th)	Bangkok
Nakhon Ratchasima The Mall^{SL} ^{TH} (1st)	Nakhon Ratchasima
Visakha (4th)	Bangkok
RMUTL Phitsanulok (5th)	Phitsanulok

Pro Challenge
Team	From
Prince	Nonthaburi
Kasetsart University	Bangkok

=== Personnel and kits ===
Team	Round	Manager	Coach	Captain	Kit manufacturer	Kit sponsors
Prince	Pro Challenge	(Thailand) Apinan Pitsanuwannawet	(Thailand) Supachai Sripoom	(Thailand) Yutthana Deeraksa	Sensai	Prince
Prince	Regular	(Thailand) Apinan Pitsanuwannawet	(Thailand) Supachai Sripoom	(Thailand) Yutthana Deeraksa	Sensai	Prince
Diamond Food	Regular	(Thailand) Decha Suwannarak	(Thailand) Somboon Nakpueng	(Thailand) Kittikun Sriutthawong	Grand Sport	Diamond Food, Fine Chef
Air Force	Regular	(Thailand) Sonti Boonrueng	(Thailand) Sonti Boonrueng	(Thailand) Mawin Maneewong	Kela	Singha
Nakhon Ratchasima	Regular	(Thailand) Preecha Mitsungneun	(Thailand) Padejsuk Wannachote	(Thailand) Wanchai Tabwises	FBT	The Mall, CP, 7-Eleven, Kubota, Thai lottery, Koh-Kae, Vana Nava, Adda
Visakha	Regular	(Thailand) Khong Kaido	(Thailand) Kajoinsak Manapornchai	(Thailand) Kitsada Somkane	Grand Sport	Visaka
RMUTL Phitsanulok	Regular	(Thailand) Thakoon Nakorntab	(Thailand) Kampol Sripoll	(Thailand) Amorntep Konhan	Grand Sport	Pibulsongkram Rajabhat University
Kasetsart	Pro Challenge	(Thailand) Srijitta Jaroenrabnopparat	(Thailand) Yutthachai Rattanawongpak	(Thailand) Kongkrit Kruein	Elevator	Kasetsart University
Kasetsart	Regular	(Thailand) Srijitta Jaroenrabnopparat	(Thailand) Yutthachai Rattanawongpak	(Thailand) Kongkrit Kruein	Elevator	Kasetsart University
Koh-Kood Cabana	Regular	(Thailand) Teerasak Sukaboon	(Thailand) Anuchet Damdungrom	(Thailand) Adigun Arun	Mizuno	Kohkood-Cabana, SAU, Asias GS

== Squads ==
=== National team players ===
- Players name in **bold** indicates the player is registered during the mid-season transfer window.

Team	Player 1	Player 2	Player 3	Free player 1	Free player 2	Free player 2
Diamond Food	Kittikun Sriutthawong	Jirayu Raksakaew	Kissada Nilsawai	Kantapat Koonmee	Jakraprop Saengsee	
RMUTL Phitsanulok				Amorntep Konhan		
Nakhon Ratchasima	Saranchit Charoensuk	Kittinon Namkhuntod				
Air Force				Mawin Maneewong	Anuchit Pakdeekaew	
Prince	Montri Puanglib			Chatmongkhon Paketkaew		
Visakha	Kitsada Somkane			Jakkapong Tongklang		

=== Foreign players ===
- Players name in **bold** indicates the player is registered during the mid-season transfer window.

Team	Player 1	Player 2	Player 3
Diamond Food VC	(Brazil) André Queiroz	(Brazil) Luiz Perotto	
Nakhon Ratchasima The Mall	(Sri Lanka) Janitha Surath	(Pakistan) **Almal Khan**	

=== Transfers ===
==== Second leg ====
Name	Moving from	Moving to
(Pakistan) Almal Khan	(Qatar) Al Gharafa S.C	(Thailand) Nakhon Ratchasima
(Thailand) Pattarapon Buoput	(Thailand) Visakha	(Thailand) Air Force
(Thailand) Kitsada Somkane	(Thailand) Visakha	(Thailand) Prince Finance
(Thailand) Sirithep Passadu	(Thailand) Visakha	(Thailand) Prince Finance
(Thailand) Supachai Prajong	(Thailand) Visakha	(Thailand) Prince Finance
(Thailand) Supakorn Jenthaisong	Free agent	(Thailand) Prince Finance
(Thailand) Supachai Rakchan	Free agent	(Thailand) Prince Finance
(Thailand) Phasert Pinkaew	Free agent	(Thailand) RMUTL Phitsanulok
(Thailand) Siwadon Sanhatham	Free agent	(Thailand) RMUTL Phitsanulok
(Thailand) Chaiya Bankammee	Free agent	(Thailand) Koh-Kood Cabana
(Thailand) Peerapan Srilueangnok	Free agent	(Thailand) Koh-Kood Cabana
(Thailand) Jeerapat Budkha	Free agent	(Thailand) Diamond Food
(Thailand) Sorranan Nuampara	Free agent	(Thailand) Diamond Food
(Thailand) Suthipong Donlakkham	Free agent	(Thailand) Diamond Food

== Schedule ==
Stage	Week	Days	Venue
First leg	1	12–13 December 2020	Nimitbut Sport Center, Bangkok
First leg	2	19–20 December 2020	Nimitbut Sport Center, Bangkok
First leg	3	26–27 December 2020	Nimitbut Sport Center, Bangkok
First leg	4	13–14 February 2021	Nimitbut Sport Center, Bangkok
First leg	5	17 February 2021,20–21 February 2021	Nimitbut Sport Center, Bangkok
First leg	6	24 February 2021,27–28 February 2021	Nimitbut Sport Center, Bangkok
Second leg	7	6–7 March 2021	Nimitbut Sport Center, Bangkok
Second leg	8	10 March 2021,13–14 March 2021	Nimitbut Sport Center, Bangkok
Second leg	9	17 March 2021,20–21 March 2021	Nimitbut Sport Center, Bangkok
Second leg	10	27–28 March 2021	MCC Hall The Mall Bangkapi, Bangkok
Final Series
Final Series	11	2–4 April 2021	MCC Hall The Mall Bangkapi, Bangkok
Final Series	12	9–11 April 2021	MCC Hall The Mall Bangkapi, Bangkok

== Format ==
Regular seasons

- First leg (Week 1–7): single round-robin; The seventh place and eighth place will relegate to Pro League.
- Second leg: (Week 8–14) single round-robin; The top four will advance to Final series.

Final series

- First leg (Week 15): single round-robin.
- Second leg: (Week 16) single round-robin.

=== Standing procedure ===
1. Number of matches won
2. Match points
3. Sets ratio
4. Points ratio
5. Result of the last match between the tied teams

Match won 3–0 or 3–1: 3 match points for the winner, 0 match points for the loser
Match won 3–2: 2 match points for the winner, 1 match point for the loser

== Regular seasons – First leg ==
=== First leg table ===
Pos	Team	Pld	W	L	Pts	SW	SL	SR	SPW	SPL	SPR	Qualification
1	Nakhon Ratchasima The Mall	7	7	0	20	21	4	5.250	614	513	1.197	Second leg
2	Diamond Food VC	7	6	1	19	20	3	6.667	566	441	1.283	Second leg
3	Air Force	7	5	2	13	16	11	1.455	593	598	0.992	Second leg
4	RMUTL Phitsanulok	7	4	3	12	13	10	1.300	546	529	1.032	Second leg
5	Koh-Kood Cabana	7	3	4	9	10	14	0.714	471	488	0.965	Second leg
6	Prince	7	2	5	7	10	16	0.625	507	519	0.977	Second leg
7	Visakha	7	1	6	4	6	18	0.333	431	456	0.945	Relegation to Pro League
8	Kasetsart University	7	0	7	0	1	21	0.048	381	549	0.694	Relegation to Pro League

=== Positions by week ===
Leader
Relegation to Pro Challenge

Team ╲ Round	1	2	3	4	5	6
Air Force	6	5	7	4	3	3
Kasetsart University	7	8	8	8	8	8
Diamond Food VC	1	1	1	1	1	2
Prince	2	4	5	7	5	6
Nakhon Ratchasima The Mall	3	2	2	2	2	1
Visakha	5	6	4	6	7	7
RMUTL Phitsanulok	8	7	6	3	4	4
Koh-Kood Cabana	4	3	3	5	6	5

=== Week 1 ===
- Venue: Nimitbut Sport Center, Bangkok
- Dates: 12–13 December 2020

Date	Time		Score		Set 1	Set 2	Set 3	Set 4	Set 5	Total	Report
12 Dec	09:00	Prince	3–1	Kasetsart University	25–15	21–25	25–17	25–19		96–76	
12 Dec	15:00	Visakha	2–3	Koh-Kood Cabana	25–23	21–25	22–25	25–20	14–16	107–109	
13 Dec	09:00	Air Force	1–3	Nakhon Ratchasima The Mall	16–25	30–28	22–25	19–25		87–103	
13 Dec	15:00	RMUTL Phitsanulok	0–3	Diamond Food VC	24–26	22–25	15–25			61–76	

=== Week 2 ===
- Venue: Nimitbut Sport Center, Bangkok
- Dates: 19–20 December 2020

Date	Time		Score		Set 1	Set 2	Set 3	Set 4	Set 5	Total	Report
19 Dec	09:00	Nakhon Ratchasima The Mall	3–1	Prince	25–22	22–25	25–23	25–20		97–90	
19 Dec	15:00	Air Force	3–1	RMUTL Phitsanulok	25–23	23–25	25–22	25–16		98–86	
20 Dec	09:00	Visakha	0–3	Diamond Food VC	15–25	18–25	23–25			56–75	
20 Dec	12:00	Koh-Kood Cabana	3–0	Kasetsart University	25–20	25–15	25–13			75–48	

=== Week 3 ===
- Venue: Nimitbut Sport Center, Bangkok
- Dates: 26–27 December 2020

Date	Time		Score		Set 1	Set 2	Set 3	Set 4	Set 5	Total	Report
26 Dec	09:00	Air Force	0–3	Diamond Food VC	18–25	17–25	19–25			54–75	
26 Dec	15:00	Koh-Kood Cabana	0–3	Nakhon Ratchasima The Mall	25–27	12–25	20–25			57–77	
27 Dec	09:00	Prince	1–3	RMUTL Phitsanulok	25–22	18–25	15–25	23–25		81–97	
27 Dec	15:00	Visakha	3–0	Kasetsart University	25–11	25–19	25–13			75–43	

=== Week 4 ===
- Sliding of the competition because Outbreak of coronavirus in Thailand
- Venue: Nimitbut Sport Center, Bangkok
- Dates: 13–14 February 2021

Date	Time		Score		Set 1	Set 2	Set 3	Set 4	Set 5	Total	Report
13 Feb*	09:00	Kasetsart University	0–3	Nakhon Ratchasima The Mall	20–25	20–25	16–25			56–75	
13 Feb*	15:00	Prince	0–3	Diamond Food VC	18–25	16–25	21–25			55–75	
14 Feb*	12:00	Air Force	3–0	Visakha	25–23	25–19	25–18			75–60	
14 Feb*	15:00	Koh-Kood Cabana	0–3	RMUTL Phitsanulok	22–25	18–25	24–26			64–76	

=== Week 5 ===
- Venue: MCC Hall The Mall Ngamwongwan, Nonthaburi
- Dates: 17,20–21 February 2021

Date	Time		Score		Set 1	Set 2	Set 3	Set 4	Set 5	Total	Report
17 Feb	09:00	Koh-Kood Cabana	2–3	Air Force	23–25	25–16	25–23	21–25	13–15	107–104	
17 Feb	15:00	Prince Finance	3–0	Visakha	25–23	29–27	25–23			79–73	
20 Feb	09:00	Nakhon Ratchasima The Mall	3–0	Visakha	25–21	25–20	25–19			75–60	
20 Feb	15:00	Prince	2–3	Air Force	25–18	25–17	19–25	23–25	14–16	106–101	
21 Feb	09:00	Diamond Food VC	3–0	Koh-Kood Cabana	25–15	26–24	25–20			76–59	
21 Feb	12:00	Kasetsart University	0–3	RMUTL Phitsanulok	26–28	12–25	15–25			53–78	

=== Week 6 ===
- Venue:Nimitbut Sport Center, Bangkok
- Dates: 24,27–28 February 2021

Date	Time		Score		Set 1	Set 2	Set 3	Set 4	Set 5	Total	Report
24 Feb	09:00	Kasetsart University	0–3	Diamond Food VC	17–25	14–25	13–25			44–75	
24 Feb	15:00	Nakhon Ratchasima The Mall	3–0	RMUTL Phitsanulok	25–17	25–17	25–16			75–50	
27 Feb	09:00	RMUTL Phitsanulok	3–1	Visakha	25–19	25–20	23–25	25–18		98–82	
27 Feb	15:00	Nakhon Ratchasima The Mall	3–2	Diamond Food VC	18–25	31–29	25–22	23–25	15–13	112–114	
28 Feb	09:00	Kasetsart University	0–3	Air Force	18–25	23–25	20–25			61–75	
28 Feb	12:00	Prince	0–3	Koh-Kood Cabana	22–25	21–25	18–25			61–75	

== Regular seasons – Second leg ==
=== Second leg table ===
Pos	Team	Pld	W	L	Pts	SW	SL	SR	SPW	SPL	SPR	Qualification
1	Diamond Food VC	5	5	0	14	15	3	5.000	365	293	1.246	Final series
2	Nakhon Ratchasima The Mall	5	4	1	12	13	4	3.250	232	224	1.036	Final series
3	RMUTL Phitsanulok	5	3	2	9	11	9	1.222	342	359	0.953	Final series
4	Prince	5	1	4	4	6	12	0.500	220	264	0.833	Final series
5	Air Force	5	1	4	3	6	14	0.429	277	286	0.969	Not passed into Final series
6	Koh-Kood Cabana	5	1	4	3	5	14	0.357	264	274	0.964	Not passed into Final series

=== Positions by week ===
Leader
Not pass to Final 4

Team ╲ Round	1	2	3	4
Air Force	2	5	5	6
Diamond Food VC	1	1	1	1
Prince	5	6	4	4
Nakhon Ratchasima The Mall	6	3	2	2
RMUTL Phitsanulok	3	2	3	3
Koh-Kood Cabana	4	4	6	6

=== Week 7 ===
- Venue: Nimitbut Sport Center, Bangkok
- Dates: 6–7 March 2021

Date	Time		Score		Set 1	Set 2	Set 3	Set 4	Set 5	Total	Report
6 Mar	18.00	Air Force	3–2	Prince	25–21	24–26	23–25	25–20	17–15	114–107	
7 Mar	12.00	RMUTL Phitsanulok	3–2	Koh-Kood Cabana	25–21	24–26	25–19	10–25	15–13	99–104	
7 Mar	15.00	Diamond Food VC	3–1	Nakhon Ratchasima The Mall	25–12	25–20	23–25	26–24		99–81	

=== Week 8 ===
- Venue: Nimitbut Sport Center, Bangkok
- Dates: 10,13–14 March 2021

Date	Time		Score		Set 1	Set 2	Set 3	Set 4	Set 5	Total	Report
10 Mar	18.00	RMUTL Phitsanulok	3–0	Air Force	25–18	25–23	25–22			75–63	
13 Mar	12.00	Air Force	2–3	Koh-Kood Cabana	25–16	18–25	25–23	22–25	10–15	100–104	
13 Mar	15.00	Nakhon Ratchasima The Mall	3–0	RMUTL Phitsanulok	25–20	26–24	25–22			76–66	
14 Mar	18.00	Diamond Food VC	3–0	Prince	25–17	25–18	25–19			75–54	

=== Week 9 ===
- Venue: Nimitbut Sport Center, Bangkok
- Dates: 17,20–21 March 2021

Date	Time		Score		Set 1	Set 2	Set 3	Set 4	Set 5	Total	Report
17 Mar	12.00	Diamond Food VC	3–0	Koh-Kood Cabana	25–18	25–18	25–20			75–56	
17 Mar	15.00	Prince	0–3	Nakhon Ratchasima The Mall	20–25	22–25	17–25			59–75	
20 Mar	18.00	Diamond Food VC	3–2	RMUTL Phitsanulok	25–16	25–19	27–29	24–26	15–12	116–102	
21 Mar	12.00	Nakhon Ratchasima The Mall	3–1	Air Force	25–23	16–25	25–23	25–22		91–93	
21 Mar	15.00	Prince	3–0	Koh-Kood Cabana	25–23	25–17	25–20			75–60	

=== Week 10 ===
- Venue: MCC Hall The Mall Bangkapi, Bangkok
- Dates: 27–28 March 2021

Date	Time		Score		Set 1	Set 2	Set 3	Set 4	Set 5	Total	Report
27 Mar	18.00	Nakhon Ratchasima The Mall	3–0	Koh-Kood Cabana	25–21	25–17	25–15			75–53	
28 Mar	12.00	Prince	1–3	RMUTL Phitsanulok	25–17	16–25	19–25	22–25		82–92	
28 Mar	15.00	Diamond Food VC	3–0	Air Force	25–15	25–23	25–18			75–56	

== Final series ==
=== Final series table ===
Pos	Team	Pld	W	L	Pts	SW	SL	SR	SPW	SPL	SPR	Final result
1	Nakhon Ratchasima The Mall	6	5	1	16	17	3	5.667	489	420	1.164	Champions
2	Diamond Food VC	6	5	1	14	15	6	2.500	477	391	1.220	Runners-up
3	RMUTL Phitsanulok	6	2	4	4	7	16	0.438	454	525	0.865	Third Place
4	Prince	6	0	6	2	4	18	0.222	429	513	0.836	Fourth Place

=== Week 11 ===
- Venue: MCC Hall The Mall Bangkapi, Bangkok
- Dates: 2–4 April 2021

Date	Time		Score		Set 1	Set 2	Set 3	Set 4	Set 5	Total	Report
2 Apr	09.00	Diamond Food VC	3–0	Prince	25–19	26–24	25–20			76–63	
2 Apr	18.00	Nakhon Ratchasima The Mall	3–0	RMUTL Phitsanulok	25–23	25–18	25–22			75–63	
3 Apr	12.00	Prince	0–3	Nakhon Ratchasima The Mall	22–25	18–25	19–25			59–75	
3 Apr	15.00	RMUTL Phitsanulok	1–3	Diamond Food VC	26–24	20–25	15–25	19–25		80–99	
4 Apr	09.00	RMUTL Phitsanulok	3–2	Prince	20–25	25–17	22–25	27–25	15–11	109–103	
4 Apr	15.00	Diamond Food VC	0–3	Nakhon Ratchasima The Mall	20–25	16–25	25–27			61–77	

=== Week 12 ===
- Venue: MCC Hall The Mall Bangkapi, Bangkok
- Dates: 9–11 April 2021

Date	Time		Score		Set 1	Set 2	Set 3	Set 4	Set 5	Total	Report
9 Apr	09.00	Prince	0–3	Diamond Food VC	23–25	15–25	17–25			55–75	
9 Apr	12.00	Nakhon Ratchasima The Mall	3–0	RMUTL Phitsanulok	25–16	25–19	25–16			75–51	
10 Apr	09.00	RMUTL Phitsanulok	0–3	Diamond Food VC	17–25	13–25	18–25			48–75	
10 Apr	15.00	Nakhon Ratchasima The Mall	3–0	Prince	25–19	25–15	25–20			75–54	
11 Apr	09.00	Prince	2–3	RMUTL Phitsanulok	25–17	25–21	17–25	18–25	13–15	98–103	
11 Apr	18.00	Nakhon Ratchasima The Mall	2–3	Diamond Food VC	20–25	25–20	25–18	19–25	15–11	104–99	

== Final standing ==
Rank	Team
1st place, gold medalist(s)	Nakhon Ratchasima The Mall
2nd place, silver medalist(s)	Diamond Food
3rd place, bronze medalist(s)	RMUTL Phitsanulok
4	Prince
5	Air Force
6	Koh-Kood Cabana
7	Visakha
8	Kasetsart University

Qualified for the Asian Club Championship and Super League
Qualified for the Super League
Relegated to Pro Challenge

2020–21 Men's Thailand League

Champion
Nakhon Ratchasima The Mall (7th title)
Team roster
Chanchai Chongfungklang, Wanchai Tabwises (c), Janita Surath, Pongsiri Sawangsri, Yuranan Buadang, Almal Khan, Nantawut Taengkrathok, Anucha Pinsuwan, Thanachot Thongdoung, Kittipong Suksala, Jirawan Thumtong, Tanapat Charoensuk, Jatuphon Dutjamayoon, Chakkrit Chandahuadong, Saranchit Charoensuk, Wutthichai Suksala, Pongpisit Chattongsoo, Boonyarid Wongtorn, Thanat Bumrungpakdee
Head coach
Padejsuk Wannachote

== Awards ==
- Most valuable player

(Sri Lanka) Janita Surath (Nakhon Ratchasima The Mall)

- Best Best Scorer

(Thailand) Amorntep Konhan (RMUTL Phitsanulok)

- Best outside spiker

(Thailand) Kittikun Sriutthawong (Diamond food)
(Thailand) Wanchai Tabwises (Nakhon Ratchasima The Mall)

- Best servers

(Brazil) André Queiroz (Diamond food)

- Best middle blocker

(Thailand) Kissada Nilsawai (Diamond food)
(Thailand) Kittipong Suksala (Nakhon Ratchasima The Mall)

- Best setter

(Thailand) Narongrit Janpirom (RMUTL Phitsanulok)

- Best opposite spiker

(Thailand) Kantapat Koonmee (Diamond food)

- Best libero

(Thailand) Tanapat Charoensuk (Nakhon Ratchasima The Mall)
