= Nattapong Kesapan =

Thai volleyball player (born 1987)

Personal information
- Full name: Cha Akat Ek Nattapong Kesapan
- Nickname: Nut
- Born: July 25, 1987 (age 39); Thailand
- Height: 1.83 m (6 ft 0 in)
- Weight: 75 kg (165 lb)

Volleyball information
- Position: Setter

National team
2009–2013	Thailand
Honours
Men's volleyball
Representing Thailand
Southeast Asian Games
Silver medal – second place	2009 Vientiane	Team

Nattapong Kesapan (Thai: นัฐพงษ์ เกศาพันธ์; RTGS: Nattapong Kesapan, born July 25, 1987) is a member of the Thailand men's national volleyball team.

== Personal life ==
Nattapong Kesapan married with Wilavan Apinyapong, at Kham Sakaesaeng, Nakhon Ratchasima on 7 May 2017.

== Clubs ==
- (Thailand) Krungkao Air Force (2012–2014)
- (Thailand) Nakhon Ratchasima (2014–2015)
- (Thailand) Chonburi E-Tech Air Force (2015–2016)

== As Coach assistant ==
- Thailand women's national under-18 volleyball team (2009)
- Thailand women's national under-20 volleyball team (2021–2022)
- Thailand women's national volleyball team (2022)
- (Thailand) Supreme Chonburi (2016–2023)

== Awards ==
=== Individual ===
- 2013-14 Men's Volleyball Thailand League "Best Setter"

=== Clubs ===
- 2014–15 Thailand League - Champion, with Nakhon Ratchasima
- 2015–16 Thailand League - 3rd place, with Chonburi E-Tech Air Force
- 2016–17 Thailand League - Champion, with Air Force
