= 2020 Men's Volleyball Thailand League =

- Dates: 18 January 2019 – 29 March 2019
- Teams: 8
- Venue: (in 5 host cities)

Final positions
- Champions: Nakhon Ratchasima The Mall (6th title)
- Runners-up: Diamond Food Saraburi
- Third place: RMUTL Phitsanulok
- Fourth place: Air Force

Tournament awards
- MVP: (Thailand) Wanchai Tabwises (Nakhon Ratchasima The Mall)

Tournament statistics
- Matches played: 56 (Regular seasons); 4 (Final series)

The 2020 Men's Volleyball Thailand League is the 15th season of the Men's Volleyball Thailand League, the top Thai professional league for men's volleyball clubs, since its establishment in 2005, also known as CP Men's Volleyball Thailand League due to the sponsorship deal with Charoen Pokphand. A total of 8 teams will compete in the league. The season will begin on 18 January 2019 and is scheduled to conclude in 2019. This season will be organized by the Thailand Volleyball Association (TVA) instead Thailand Volleyball Co., Ltd. The season started.

== Clubs ==
=== Personnel and sponsors ===
Team	Head coach	Team captain	Colors	Kit manufacturer	Main Sponsor
Air Force	(Thailand) Anucha Srisuk	(Thailand) Mawin Maneewong		Kela	Singha
Asia GS Samutsakorn	(Thailand) Jaroen Janjaroenjai	(Thailand) Somkriad Sombat		Sensei	Asia GS
Diamond Food VC	(Thailand) Somboon Nakpueng	(Thailand) Kittikun Sriutthawong		Grand Sport	Diamond Food
Prince Finance	(Thailand) Jenvit Ochaampawan	(Thailand) Montri Vaenpradab			Prince Finance
Nakhon Ratchasima The Mall	(Thailand) Padejsuk Wannachote	(Thailand) Wanchai Tabwises		FBT	The Mall
Visakha	(Thailand) Sarin Karnket	(Thailand) Kitsada Somkane		Grand Sport	Visaka
RMUTL Phitsanulok	(Thailand) Kampol Sripoll	(Thailand) Amorntep Konhan		Grand Sport	RMUTL
Koh-Kood Cabana	(Thailand) Yutthana Ruengkit	(Thailand) Yutthana Deeraksa		Mizuno	Koh-Kood Cabana

=== Managerial changes ===
- TBA

=== National team players ===
Note :

(substituted off) : players who released during second leg transfer window; (substituted on) : players who registered during second leg transfer window; →: players who left club after registered during first or second leg.

- TBA

National team player quotas except from regulation

=== Foreign players ===
AVC players.
CAVB players.
CEV players.
CSV players.
No foreign player registered.

Note :
(substituted off) : players who released during second leg transfer window;
(substituted on) : players who registered during second leg transfer window;
→: players who left club after registered during first or second leg.

Team	Leg	Player 1	Player 2
Nakhon Ratchasima The Mall	1st	(Sri Lanka) Janita Surat (AVC) (substituted on)	(Pakistan) Aimal Khan (AVC) (substituted on)
Nakhon Ratchasima The Mall	2nd		
Air Force	1st	(Pakistan) Muhammad Waseem (AVC) (substituted on)	(Kyrgyzstan) Temir Musa Uulu (AVC) (substituted on)
Air Force	2nd		
Asia GS Samutsakorn	1st	(Japan) Daichi Yanagawa (AVC) (substituted on)	(Japan) Ikeda Ryunosuke (AVC) (substituted on)
Asia GS Samutsakorn	2nd		
Visaka	1st	(Philippines) Marck Espejo (AVC) (substituted on)	(Brazil) Kaio Fábio Rocha (CSV) (substituted on)
Visaka	2nd		
Diamond Food Saraburi	1st	(Brazil) Luiz Perotto (CSV) (substituted on)	(Qatar) Andre Luiz Queiroz (AVC) (substituted on)
Diamond Food Saraburi	2nd		
Prince Finance	1st	(Cambodia) Soun Channaro (AVC) (substituted on)	(Cambodia) Veasna Voeurn (AVC) (substituted on)
Prince Finance	2nd		

=== Transfers ===
==== First leg ====
Name	Moving from	Moving to
(Thailand) Khanit Sinlapasorn	(Thailand) Asia GS Samutsakorn	(Thailand) Air Force
(Thailand) Kissada Nilsawai	(Thailand) Air Force	(Thailand) Diamond Food
(Thailand) Jakraprop Saengsee	(Thailand) Air Force	(Thailand) Diamond Food
(Brazil) Luiz Perotto	(Libya) Asswehly Sports Club	(Thailand) Diamond Food
(Qatar) Andre Luiz Queiroz	(Qatar) Al Rayyan	(Thailand) Diamond Food
(Sri Lanka) Janita Surat	(Sri Lanka) Sri-Lanka lion	(Thailand) Nakhon Ratchasima
(Philippines) Marck Espejo	(Japan) Weisse Adler	(Thailand) Visakha
(Brazil) Kaio Fábio Rocha	(Brazil) Itapetininga VC	(Thailand) Visakha
(Pakistan) Aimal Khan	(Qatar) Al-Gharafa	(Thailand) Nakhon Ratchasima
(Pakistan) Muhammad Waseem	(Pakistan) WAPDA	(Thailand) Air Force
(Kyrgyzstan) Temir Musa Uulu	(Kyrgyzstan) Ular	(Thailand) Air Force
(Japan) Daichi Yanagawa	(Mongolia) Tenuun-ogoo	(Thailand) Asia GS Samutsakorne
(Japan) Ikeda Ryunosuke	(Mongolia) Tenuun-ogoo	(Thailand) Asia GS Samutsakorne
(Cambodia) Soun Channaro	Free agent	(Thailand) Prince Finance
(Cambodia) Veasna Voeurn	Free agent	(Thailand) Prince Finance

== Format ==
Regular seasons

- First leg (Week 1–5): single round-robin; The eighth place will relegate to Pro League.
- Second leg: (Week 6–9) single round-robin; The top four will advance to Final series and the seventh place will relegate to Pro League.

Final series

- First leg (Week 10): single round-robin.
- Second leg: (Week 11) single round-robin.

=== Standing procedure ===
1. Number of matches won
2. Match points
3. Sets ratio
4. Points ratio
5. Result of the last match between the tied teams

Match won 3–0 or 3–1: 3 match points for the winner, 0 match points for the loser
Match won 3–2: 2 match points for the winner, 1 match point for the loser

== Regular seasons – First leg ==
=== First leg table ===
Pos	Team	Pld	W	L	Pts	SW	SL	SR	SPW	SPL	SPR	Qualification
1	Diamond Food VC	7	7	0	21	21	2	10.500	577	421	1.371	Second leg
2	Nakhon Ratchasima The Mall	7	6	1	17	19	7	2.714	616	547	1.126	Second leg
3	Visakha	7	4	3	11	13	13	1.000	595	603	0.987	Second leg
4	Air Force	7	3	4	9	12	15	0.800	574	606	0.947	Second leg
5	Asia GS Samutsakorn	7	3	4	8	11	14	0.786	544	579	0.940	Second leg
6	RMUTL Phitsanulok	7	2	5	8	11	17	0.647	624	636	0.981	Second leg
7	Koh-Kood Cabana	7	2	5	6	10	19	0.526	579	654	0.885	Second leg
8	Prince Finance	7	1	6	4	8	18	0.444	546	609	0.897	Relegation to Pro League

=== Week 1 ===
- Venue: MCC Hall The Mall Bangkapi, Bangkok
- Dates: 18–22 January 2020

Date	Time		Score		Set 1	Set 2	Set 3	Set 4	Set 5	Total	Report
18 Jan	12:00	Koh-Kood Cabana	2–3	Nakhon Ratchasima The Mall	19–25	25–22	25–22	19–25	11–15	99–109	
18 Jan	15:00	Air Force	3–0	Asia GS Samutsakorn	25–18	25–22	25–21			75–61	
19 Jan	15:00	Visakha	3–1	Prince Finance	25–22	25–21	18–25	25–22		93–90	
19 Jan	18:00	RMUTL Phitsanulok	0–3	Diamond Food Saraburi	20–25	16–25	14–25			50–75	
22 Jan	09:00	Air Force	1–3	Diamond Food Saraburi	21–25	25–21	17–25	20–25		83–96	
22 Jan	12:00	Nakhon Ratchasima The Mall	3–1	Asia GS Samutsakorn	22–25	25–21	27–25	25–20		99–91	

=== Week 2 ===
- Venue: MCC Hall The Mall Bangkapi, Bangkok
- Dates: 25–29 January 2020

Date	Time		Score		Set 1	Set 2	Set 3	Set 4	Set 5	Total	Report
25 Jan	15.00	RMUTL Phitsanulok	1–3	Visakha	30–32	27–29	25–20	24–26		106–107	
25 Jan	18.00	Air Force	3–1	Prince Finance	25–23	23–25	25–22	25–16		98–86	
26 Jan	12.00	Asia GS Samutsakorn	3–0	Koh-Kood Cabana	25–19	25–20	25–20			75–59	
26 Jan	15.00	Diamond Food Saraburi	3–1	Nakhon Ratchasima The Mall	25–16	26–28	25–17	25–23		101–84	
29 Jan	09.00	Koh-Kood Cabana	2–3	Visakha	25–19	25–23	19–25	21–25	11–15	101–107	
29 Jan	15.00	RMUTL Phitsanulok	2–3	Air Force	19–25	23–25	25–23	25–20	13–15	105–108	

=== Week 3 ===
- Venue: MCC Hall The Mall Korat, Nakhon Ratchasima
- Dates: 1–5 February 2020

Date	Time		Score		Set 1	Set 2	Set 3	Set 4	Set 5	Total	Report
1 Feb	15.00	Diamond Food Saraburi	3–0	Visakha	28–26	25–14	25–19			78–59	
1 Feb	18.00	Nakhon Ratchasima The Mall	3–0	Prince Finance	29–27	25–22	25–16			79–65	
2 Feb	12.00	Koh-Kood Cabana	3–2	Air Force	25–21	25–22	21–25	22–25	15–10	108–103	
2 Feb	15.00	RMUTL Phitsanulok	3–1	Asia GS Samutsakorn	25–18	26–28	27–25	25–11		103–82	
5 Feb	12.00	Prince Finance	1–3	RMUTL Phitsanulok	28–26	20–25	19–25	17–25		84–101	
5 Feb	15.00	Nakhon Ratchasima The Mall	3–1	Visakha	25–21	25–21	19–25	25–23		94–90	

=== Week 4 ===
- Venue: MCC Hall The Mall Korat, Nakhon Ratchasima
- Dates: 8–12 February 2020

Date	Time		Score		Set 1	Set 2	Set 3	Set 4	Set 5	Total	Report
8 Feb	12.00	Prince Finance	0–3	Diamond Food Saraburi	11–25	17–25	16–25			44–75	
8 Feb	15.00	Asia GS Samutsakorn	3–0	Visakha	27–25	25–16	25–23			77–64	
9 Feb	15.00	RMUTL Phitsanulok	2–3	Koh-Kood Cabana	22–25	25–19	25–20	24–26	13–15	109–105	
9 Feb	18.00	Nakhon Ratchasima The Mall	3–0	Air Force	25–18	25–17	25–16			75–51	
12 Feb	09.00	Prince Finance	3–0	Koh-Kood Cabana	25–16	25–19	25–21			75–56	
12 Feb	15.00	Diamond Food Saraburi	3–0	Asia GS Samutsakorn	25–9	25–16	27–25			77–50	

=== Week 5 ===
- Venue: Eastern National Sports Training Center, Pattaya
- Dates: 15–16 February 2020

Date	Time		Score		Set 1	Set 2	Set 3	Set 4	Set 5	Total	Report
15 Feb	12.00	Air Force	0–3	Visakha	21–25	19–25	17–25			57–75	
15 Feb	15.00	RMUTL Phitsanulok	0–3	Nakhon Ratchasima The Mall	18–25	19–25	13–25			50–75	
16 Feb	12.00	Koh-Kood Cabana	0–3	Diamond Food Saraburi	19–25	11–25	21–25			51–75	
16 Feb	18.00	Asia GS Samutsakorn	3–2	Prince Finance	21–25	25–22	25–19	22–25	15–11	108–102	

== Regular seasons – Second leg ==
=== Second leg table ===
Pos	Team	Pld	W	L	Pts	SW	SL	SR	SPW	SPL	SPR	Qualification
1	Diamond Food VC	6	6	0	16	18	5	3.600	545	469	1.162	Final series
2	Nakhon Ratchasima The Mall	6	5	1	15	17	7	2.429	570	482	1.183	Final series
3	RMUTL Phitsanulok	6	4	2	11	13	10	1.300	525	505	1.040	Final series
4	Air Force	6	3	3	10	12	10	1.200	490	489	1.002	Final series
5	Visakha	6	2	4	7	10	13	0.769	515	516	0.998	Not passed into Final series
6	Koh-Kood Cabana	6	1	5	3	5	18	0.278	458	554	0.827	Not passed into Final series
7	Asia GS Samutsakorn	6	0	6	1	5	18	0.278	458	554	0.827	Not passed into Final series

=== Week 6 ===
- Venue: MCC Hall The Mall Bangkapi, Bangkok
- Dates: 22–26 January 2020

Date	Time		Score		Set 1	Set 2	Set 3	Set 4	Set 5	Total	Report
22 Feb	12.00	Diamond Food Saraburi	3–0	Koh-Kood Cabana	25–16	25–20	25–18			75–54	
22 Feb	18.00	Nakhon Ratchasima The Mall	3–1	RMUTL Phitsanulok	22–25	29–27	25–20	25–18		101–90	
23 Feb	12.00	Visakha	3–1	Koh-Kood Cabana	17–25	25–21	25–18	25–21		92–85	
23 Feb	18.00	Air Force	3–0	Asia GS Samutsakorn	25–16	25–21	25–18			75–55	
26 Feb	09.00	Nakhon Ratchasima The Mall	3–1	Asia GS Samutsakorn	25–11	25–20	23–25	25–21		98–77	
26 Feb	12.00	Visakha	1–3	Air Force	22–25	25–18	19–25	16–25		82–93	

=== Week 7 ===
- Venue: MCC Hall The Mall Bangkapi, Bangkok
- Dates: 29 January–4 March 2020

Date	Time		Score		Set 1	Set 2	Set 3	Set 4	Set 5	Total	Report
29 Feb	12.00	Asia GS Samutsakorn	2–3	RMUTL Phitsanulok	22–25	25–23	25–21	21–25	6–15	99–109	
29 Feb	15.00	Diamond Food Saraburi	3–2	Nakhon Ratchasima The Mall	25–23	15–25	27–25	24–26	15–12	106–111	
1 Mar	12.00	Air Force	3–0	Koh-Kood Cabana	25–21	25–23	25–22			75–66	
1 Mar	15.00	RMUTL Phitsanulok	3–1	Visakha	20–25	29–27	25–22	25–23		99–97	
4 Mar	09.00	Visakha	0–3	Nakhon Ratchasima The Mall	14–25	20–25	23–25			57–75	
4 Mar	12.00	Diamond Food Saraburi	3–0	Air Force	25–27	25–16	25–18			75–61	

=== Week 8 ===
- Venue: Keelawes 1 Gymnasium, Bangkok
- Dates: 7–11 March 2020

Date	Time		Score		Set 1	Set 2	Set 3	Set 4	Set 5	Total	Report
7 Mar	12.00	Asia GS Samutsakorn	0–3	Visakha	17–25	19–25	16–25			52–75	
7 Mar	18.00	Air Force	2–3	Nakhon Ratchasima The Mall	25–22	25–27	25–21	15–25	11–15	101–110	
8 Mar	12.00	Asia GS Samutsakorn	1–3	Koh-Kood Cabana	26–24	24–26	23–25	22–25		95–100	
8 Mar	15.00	RMUTL Phitsanulok	0–3	Diamond Food Saraburi	15–25	18–25	20–25			53–75	
11 Mar	12.00	Koh-Kood Cabana	0–3	RMUTL Phitsanulok	16–25	15–25	15–25			46–75	
11 Mar	15.00	Visakha	2–3	Diamond Food Saraburi	23–25	31–29	23–25	25–21	10–15	112–115	

=== Week 9 ===
- Venue: MCC Hall The Mall Korat, Nakhon Ratchasima
- Dates: 14–15 March 2020

Date	Time		Score		Set 1	Set 2	Set 3	Set 4	Set 5	Total	Report
14 Mar	18.00	Asia GS Samutsakorn	1–3	Diamond Food Saraburi	12–25	25–22	23–25	20–25		80–97	
15 Mar	15.00	Koh-Kood Cabana	0–3	Nakhon Ratchasima The Mall	19–25	18–25	14–25			51–75	
15 Mar	21.00	RMUTL Phitsanulok	3–1	Air Force	24–26	25–19	25–22	25–20		99–87	

== Final series ==
=== Final series table ===
Pos	Team	Pld	W	L	Pts	SW	SL	SR	SPW	SPL	SPR	Final result
1	Nakhon Ratchasima The Mall	6	6	0	16	15	2	7.500	532	447	1.190	Champions
2	Diamond Food VC	6	4	2	13	12	4	3.000	513	459	1.118	Runners-up
3	RMUTL Phitsanulok	6	1	5	4	6	16	0.375	469	476	0.985	Third Place
4	Air Force	6	1	5	3	5	16	0.313	431	527	0.818	Fourth Place

=== Week 10 ===
==== Final Series Week 1 ====
- Venue: Keelawes 1 Gymnasium, Bangkok
- Dates: 21–23 July 2020

Date	Time		Score		Set 1	Set 2	Set 3	Set 4	Set 5	Total	Report
21 July	10.00	Nakhon Ratchasima The Mall	3–2	RMUTL Phitsanulok	25–15	23–25	25–17	21–25	15–12	109–94	
21 July	16.00	Air Force	1–3	Diamond Food Saraburi	25–23	16–25	21–25	27–29		89–102	
22 July	10.00	Diamond Food Saraburi	3–0	RMUTL Phitsanulok	25–22	25–23	25–17			75–62	
22 July	13.00	Air Force	0–3	Nakhon Ratchasima The Mall	21–25	25–27	20–25			66–77	
23 July	10.00	Air Force	3–1	RMUTL Phitsanulok	31–29	22–25	28–26	25–23		106–103	
23 July	13.00	Nakhon Ratchasima The Mall	3–0	Diamond Food Saraburi	25–23	27–25	25–21			77–69	

=== Week 11 ===
==== Final Series Week 2 ====
- Venue: MCC Hall The Mall Bangkapi, Bangkok
- Dates: 28–30 July 2020

Date	Time		Score		Set 1	Set 2	Set 3	Set 4	Set 5	Total	Report
28 July	10.00	Nakhon Ratchasima The Mall	3–0	RMUTL Phitsanulok	25–15	25–23	25–15			75–53	
28 July	16.00	Air Force	0–3	Diamond Food Saraburi	16–25	19–25	15–25			50–75	
29 July	10.00	Diamond Food Saraburi	3–0	RMUTL Phitsanulok	25–17	25–21	26–24			76–62	
29 July	13.00	Nakhon Ratchasima The Mall	3–0	Air Force	25–19	25–15	25–15			75–49	
30 July	10.00	Air Force	1–3	RMUTL Phitsanulok	25–20	21–25	16–25	9–25		71–95	
30 July	13.00	Diamond Food Saraburi	2–3	Nakhon Ratchasima The Mall	26–24	20–25	25–21	32–34	13–15	116–119	

== Final standing ==
Rank	Team
1st place, gold medalist(s)	Nakhon Ratchasima The Mall
2nd place, silver medalist(s)	Diamond Food
3rd place, bronze medalist(s)	RMUTL Phitsanulok
4	Air Force
5	Visakha
6	Koh-Kood Cabana
7	Asia GS Samutsakorn
8	Prince Finance

Relegated to Pro Challenge

2019–20 Men's Thailand League

Champion
Nakhon Ratchasima The Mall (6th title)
Team roster
Khomsan Phoonsung, Wanchai Tabwises (c), Janita Surath, Pongsiri Sawangsri, Yuranan Buadang, Almal Khan, Nantawut Taengkrathok, Anucha Pinsuwan, Thanachot Thongdoung, Kittipong Suksala, Jirawan Thumtong, Tanapat Charoensuk, Jatuphon Dutjamayoon, Chakkrit Chandahuadong, Saranchit Charoensuk, Wutthichai Suksala, Pongpisit Chattongsoo, Boonyarid Wongtorn, Thanat Bumrungpakdee
Head coach
Padejsuk Wannachote

== Awards ==
- Most valuable player

(Thailand) Wanchai Tabwises (Nakhon Ratchasima The Mall)

- Best scorer

(Thailand) Amorntep Konhan (RMUTL Phitsanulok)

- Best outside spiker

(Thailand) Wanchai Tabwises (Nakhon Ratchasima The Mall)
(Thailand) Kittikun Sriutthawong (Diamond Food VC)

- Best servers

(Thailand) Jirayu Raksakaew (Diamond Food VC)

- Best middle blocker

(Thailand) Kissada Nilsawai (Diamond Food VC)
(Thailand) Aekkawee Bangsri (RMUTL Phitsanulok)

- Best setter

(Thailand) Narongrit Janpirom (RMUTL Phitsanulok)

- Best opposite spiker

(Sri Lanka) Janita Surath (Nakhon Ratchasima The Mall)

- Best libero

(Thailand) Tanapat Charoensuk (Nakhon Ratchasima The Mall)
