= Jirayu Raksakaew =

Thai volleyball player (born 1987)

Personal information
- Full name: Jirayu Raksakaew
- Nickname: James
- Born: 3 August 1987 (age 39); Nakhon Si Thammarat, Thailand
- Height: 1.95 m (6 ft 5 in)
- Weight: 90 kg (198 lb)
- Spike: 350 cm (140 in)
- Block: 330 cm (130 in)

Volleyball information
- Position: Opposite spiker
- Current club: Saraburi
- Number: 1

National team
2009–2018	Thailand
Honours
Men's volleyball
Representing Thailand
Southeast Asian Games
Silver medal – second place	2009 Vientiane	Team
Gold medal – first place	2011 Palembang/Jakarta	Team
Gold medal – first place	2013 Naypyidaw	Team
Gold medal – first place	2015 Singapore	Team
Gold medal – first place	2017 Kuala Lumpur	Team

Jirayu Raksakaew (Thai: จิรายุ รักษาแก้ว; RTGS: Chirayu Raksakaeo, born 3 August 1987) is a member of the Thailand men's national volleyball team.

== Career ==
Jirayu played the 2017 season on loan with the Thai club Air Force.

== Clubs ==
- (Thailand) Chakungrao - Armed forces (2009–2010)
- (Thailand) Chonburi (2011–2013)
- (Vietnam) Tràng An Ninh Bình (2012) (loan)
- (Switzerland) Le Lausanne Université Club (2014–2015)
- (Thailand) Chonburi E-tech Air Force (2015–2016)
- (Maldives) Malidivian Sport & Recreation Club (2016)
- (Thailand) Ratchaburi (2016–2017)
- (Thailand) Air Force (2017)
- (Thailand) NK Fitness Samutsakhon (2017–2018)
- (Thailand) Diamond Food (2018–2021)

== Awards ==
=== Individual ===
- 2009–10 Thailand League "Best Scorer"
- 2009–10 Thailand League "Best Spiker"
- 2010–11 Thailand League "Best Server"
- 2011–12 Thailand League "Most Valuable Player"
- 2011–12 Thailand League "Best Scorer"
- 2011–12 Thailand League "Best Spiker"
- 2011–12 Thailand League "Best Server"
- 2012–13 Thailand League "Best Scorer"
- 2016 Thai-Denmark Super League "Best Blocker"
- 2016–17 Thailand League "Best Opposite"
- 2019–20 Thailand League "Best Server"

=== Clubs ===
- 2009–10 Thailand League - Champion, with Chakungrao - Armed forces
- 2010–11 Thailand League - Champion, with Chonburi
- 2011–12 Thailand League - Champion, with Chonburi
- 2012–13 Thailand League - Bronze medal, with Chonburi
- 2013–14 Thailand League - Runner-Up, with Chonburi
- 2014 Thai-Denmark Super League - Champion, with Chonburi
- 2015–16 Thailand League - Bronze medal, with Chonburi E-Tech Air Force
- 2016–17 Thailand League - Bronze medal, with Ratchaburi
- 2018 Thai–Denmark Super League - Runner-Up, with Visakha
- 2018–19 Thailand League - Runner-Up, with Saraburi
- 2019 Thai–Denmark Super League - Third, with Saraburi
- 2019–20 Thailand League - Silver medal, with Diamond Food
- 2020–21 Thailand League - Silver medal, with Diamond Food
