= Kissada Nilsawai =

Thai volleyball player (born 1992)

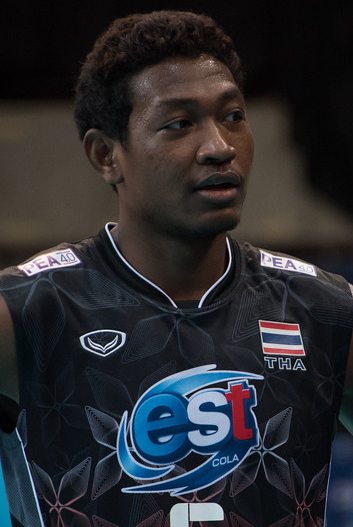
- Kissada in 2018

Personal information
- Full name: Phan Cha Akat Ek Kissada Nilsawai
- Born: 17 April 1992 (age 34); Samut Prakan, Thailand
- Height: 2.02 m (6 ft 8 in)
- Weight: 112 kg (247 lb)
- Spike: 350 cm (11 ft 6 in)
- Block: 335 cm (11 ft 0 in)

Volleyball information
- Position: Middle Blocker
- Current club: Nakhon Ratchasima
- Number: 25

National team
2011–2025	Thailand
Honours
Men's volleyball
Representing Thailand
Southeast Asian Games
Gold medal – first place	2011 Jakarta-Palembang	Team
Gold medal – first place	2013 Naypyidaw	Team
Gold medal – first place	2015 Singapore	Team
Gold medal – first place	2017 Kuala Lumpur	Team
Gold medal – first place	2025 Bangkok	Team
Bronze medal – third place	2019 Pasig	Team

Kissada Yamine Nilsawai (Thai: กฤษฎา นิลไสว; RTGS: Kritsada Ninsawai, born 14 April 1992) is a Thai volleyball player who is currently the captain of the Thailand men's national volleyball team. He is of Malian descent and is the first volleyball player of African ancestry to represent Thailand at international level.

== Clubs ==
- (Thailand) Chonburi (2011–2016)
- (Thailand) Air Force (2016–2019)
- (Thailand) Diamond Food (2019–2022)
- (Thailand) Nakhon Ratchasima (2022–2026)

== Awards ==
=== Individual ===
- 2015–16 Thailand League – "Best Blocker"
- 2016–17 Thailand League – "Best Middle Blocker"
- 2017 Thai-Denmark Super League "Best Server"
- 2017–18 Thailand League – "Best Middle Blocker"
- 2018 Thai-Denmark Super League "Best Blocker"
- 2019–20 Thailand League – "Best Middle Blocker"
- 2020–21 Thailand League – "Best Middle Blocker"
- 2021–22 Thailand League – "Best Middle Blocker"
- 2023 Asian Challenge Cup "Best Blocker"
- 2024–25 Thailand League – "Best Middle Blocker"
- 2025 SEA V.League – "Best Middle Blocker"

=== Clubs ===
- 2010–11 Thailand League - Champion, with Chonburi
- 2011–12 Thailand League - Champion, with Chonburi
- 2012–13 Thailand League - Bronze Medal, with Chonburi
- 2013–14 Thailand League - Runner-up, with Chonburi
- 2014 Thai–Denmark Super League - Champion, with Chonburi
- 2015 Thai–Denmark Super League - Champion, with Chonburi
- 2015–16 Thailand League - Bronze Medal, with Chonburi E-Tech Air Force
- 2016–17 Thailand League - Champion, with Air Force
- 2017 Thai–Denmark Super League - Runner-up, with Air Force
- 2017–18 Thailand League - Champion, with Air Force
- 2018 Thai–Denmark Super League - Champion, with Air Force
- 2017–18 Thailand League - Champion, with Air Force
- 2019 Thai–Denmark Super League - Runner-Up, with Air Force
- 2021–22 Thailand League - Champion, with Diamond Food
- 2022–23 Thailand League - Champion, with Nakhon Ratchasima
- 2022–23 Thailand League - Champion, with Nakhon Ratchasima
- 2023–24 Thailand League - Champion, with Nakhon Ratchasima
- 2024–25 Thailand League - Champion, with Nakhon Ratchasima
- 2025–26 Thailand League - Champion, with Nakhon Ratchasima

== Royal decoration ==
- 2014 – Silver Medalist (Seventh Class) of The Most Admirable Order of the Direkgunabhorn
