= Volleyball Thai-Denmark Super League =

- Sport: Volleyball
- Founded: Men: 2014; Women: 2013
- No. of teams: Men: 6 Women: 6 (8 2013 only)
- Country: Thailand
- Continent: AVC (Asia)
- Most recent champions: Men: Nakhon Ratchasima (3 titles); Women: Supreme Chonburi (3 titles)
- Most titles: Men: Nakhon Ratchasima (3 titles); Women: Supreme Chonburi (3 titles)
- Website: Thailand Volleyball Association

Volleyball Thai-Denmark Super League (Thai: วอลเลย์บอลไทยเดนมาร์คซูเปอร์ลีก) is volleyball competition take the top teams from Volleyball Thailand League. First held in 2013, the only women's team later in 2014 have been added men's teams.

== Men ==
=== Current clubs 2019 ===
- (Thailand) Air Force
- (Thailand) Diamond Food VC
- (Thailand) Visakha
- (Thailand) Nakhon Ratchasima The Mall
- (Thailand) RMUTL Phitsanulok
- (Thailand) NK Fitness Samutsakorn

=== Previous winners ===
Season	Champion	Runner-up
2020 *	—N/a	—N/a
2019	(Thailand) Nakhon Ratchasima	(Thailand) Air Force
2018	(Thailand) Air Force	(Thailand) Visakha
2017	(Thailand) Nakhon Ratchasima	(Thailand) Air Force
2016	(Thailand) Nakhon Ratchasima	(Thailand) Chonburi E-Tech Air Force
2015	(Thailand) Chonburi E-Tech Air Force	(Thailand) Wing 46 Toyota-Phitsanulok
2014	(Thailand) Chonburi E-Tech Air Force	(Thailand) Nakhon Ratchasima

- 2020 is cancel the competition due to outbreak of COVID-19

=== Titles by team ===
Club	Titles	Years won
(Thailand) Nakhon Ratchasima	3	2016, 2017, 2019
(Thailand) Chonburi E-Tech Air Force	2	2014, 2015
(Thailand) Air Force	1	2018

=== Medal table by team ===
Rank	Nation	Gold	Silver	Bronze	Total
1	(Thailand) Nakhon Ratchasima	3	1	1	5
2	(Thailand) Chonburi E-Tech Air Force	2	1	0	3
3	(Thailand) Air Force	1	2	0	3
4	(Thailand) Phitsanulok	0	1	3	4
5	(Thailand) Visakha	0	1	1	2
6	(Thailand) Sisaket Krungkao	0	0	2	2
7	(Thailand) Cosmo Chiang Rai	0	0	1	1
7	(Thailand) Diamond Food Saraburi	0	0	1	1
7	(Thailand) Kasetsart	0	0	1	1
7	(Thailand) Samanun Ratchaburi	0	0	1	1
Totals (10 entries)		6	6	11	23

== Women ==
=== Current clubs 2019 ===
- (Thailand) Nakhon Ratchasima
- (Thailand) Supreme Chonburi
- (Thailand) 3BB Nakornnont
- (Thailand) Quint Air Force
- (Thailand) Thai–Denmark Khonkaen Star
- (Thailand) Opart 369

=== Previous winners ===
Season	Champion	Runner-up
2020 *	—N/a	—N/a
2019	(Thailand) Supreme Chonburi	(Thailand) Nakhon Ratchasima The Mall
2018	(Thailand) Supreme Chonburi	(Thailand) Bangkok Glass
2017	(Thailand) Supreme Chonburi	(Thailand) Bangkok Glass
2016	(Thailand) Bangkok Glass	(Thailand) Supreme Chonburi
2015	(Thailand) Bangkok Glass	(Thailand) 3BB Nakhonnont
2014	(Thailand) Ayutthaya A.T.C.C	(Thailand) Nakhon Ratchasima
2013	(Thailand) Idea Khonkaen	(Thailand) Supreme Chonburi

- 2020 is cancel the competition due to outbreak of COVID-19

=== Titles by team ===
Club	Titles	Years won
(Thailand) Supreme Chonburi	3	2017, 2018, 2019
(Thailand) Bangkok Glass	2	2015, 2016
(Thailand) Ayutthaya A.T.C.C	1	2014
(Thailand) Idea Khonkaen	1	2013

=== Medal table by team ===
Rank	Nation	Gold	Silver	Bronze	Total
1	(Thailand) Supreme Chonburi	3	2	0	5
2	(Thailand) Bangkok Glass	2	2	0	4
3	(Thailand) Khonkaen Star	1	0	3	4
4	(Thailand) Ayutthaya A.T.C.C	1	0	2	3
5	(Thailand) Nakhon Ratchasima	0	2	3	5
6	(Thailand) 3BB Nakhonnont	0	1	3	4
7	(Thailand) Sisaket	0	0	1	1
Totals (7 entries)		7	7	12	26

== See also ==
- Men's Volleyball Thailand League
- Women's Volleyball Thailand League
- Men's Volleyball Pro Challenge
- Women's Volleyball Pro Challenge
