= Volleyball at the 2011 SEA Games =

Volleyball at the 2011 SEA Games was held at the University of Sriwijaya, Palembang, Indonesia. Two events were contested.

== Indoor ==
=== Men's tournament ===
==== Preliminary round ====
Pos	Team	Pld	W	L	Pts	SW	SL	SR	SPW	SPL	SPR	Qualification
1	Thailand	5	5	0	15	15	2	7.500	411	351	1.171	Gold Medal match
2	Indonesia	5	4	1	12	12	6	2.000	410	353	1.161	Gold Medal match
3	Vietnam	5	3	2	9	11	8	1.375	423	412	1.027	
4	Myanmar	5	2	3	6	10	8	1.250	330	405	0.815	
5	Malaysia	5	1	4	3	5	13	0.385	428	300	1.427	
6	Cambodia	5	0	5	0	1	12	0.083	322	412	0.782	

	Score		Set 1	Set 2	Set 3	Set 4	Set 5
Vietnam	3–0	Malaysia	25-18	25-18	25-20		
Cambodia	0–3	Indonesia	10-25	22-25	13-25		
Thailand	3–1	Myanmar	25-27	25-23	25-19	25-18	
Malaysia	1–3	Indonesia	26-24	16-25	21-25	22-25	
Vietnam	1–3	Thailand	15-25	25-22	20-25	19-25	
Cambodia	0–3	Myanmar	18-25	28-30	24-26		
Thailand	3–0	Malaysia	26-24	25-16	26-24		
Indonesia	3–1	Myanmar	25-22	22-25	25-20		
Vietnam	3–0	Cambodia	25-20	25-20	25-14		
Myanmar	3–0	Malaysia	25-14	25-17	25-19		
Cambodia	0–3	Thailand	22-25	18-25	11-25		
Cambodia	1–3	Malaysia	23-25	27-25	23-25	29-31	
Vietnam	1–3	Indonesia	18-25	21-25	25-23	17-25	
Myanmar	2–3	Vietnam	22-25	26-24	26-24	21-25	9-15
Thailand	3–0	Indonesia	25-23	25-20	25-23		

==== Gold Medal match ====
November 20, 2011	Thailand	3–0	Indonesia	Gymnasium University of Sriwijaya, Palembang, Indonesia
November 20, 2011	(25–23, 25–17, 25–19)			Gymnasium University of Sriwijaya, Palembang, Indonesia

==== Final standing ====
Rank	Team
1st place, gold medalist(s)	Thailand
2nd place, silver medalist(s)	Indonesia
3rd place, bronze medalist(s)	Vietnam
4	Myanmar
5	Malaysia
6	Cambodia

2011 Men's SEA Games champions

Thailand

=== Women's tournament ===
==== Preliminary round ====
Pos	Team	Pld	W	L	Pts	SW	SL	SR	SPW	SPL	SPR	Qualification
1	Thailand	4	4	0	12	12	0	MAX	300	122	2.459	Gold Medal match
2	Vietnam	4	3	1	9	9	4	2.250	298	181	1.646	Gold Medal match
3	Indonesia	4	2	2	6	7	6	1.167	268	228	1.175	
4	Myanmar	4	1	3	3	3	9	0.333	190	225	0.844	
5	Timor-Leste	4	0	4	0	0	12	0.000	0	300	0.000	

	Score		Set 1	Set 2	Set 3	Set 4	Set 5
Thailand	3–0	Vietnam	25-17	25-11	25-21		
Indonesia	3–0	Timor-Leste	25-0	25-0	25-0		
Indonesia	3–0	Myanmar	25-17	25-19	25-18		
Vietnam	3–0	Timor-Leste	25-0	25-0	25-0		
Thailand	3–0	Timor-Leste	25-0	25-0	25-0		
Vietnam	3–0	Myanmar	25-14	25-8	25-14		
Indonesia	1–3	Vietnam	17-25	26-24	14-25	13-25	
Thailand	3–0	Myanmar	25-9	25-12	25-4		
Timor-Leste	0–3	Myanmar	0-25	0-25	0-25		
Indonesia	0–3	Thailand	13-25	16-25	19-25		

==== Gold Medal match ====
November 20, 2012	Thailand	3–1	Vietnam	Gymnasium University of Sriwijaya, Palembang, Indonesia
November 20, 2012	(21–25, 25–20, 25–15, 25–14)			Gymnasium University of Sriwijaya, Palembang, Indonesia

==== Final standing ====
Rank	Team
1st place, gold medalist(s)	Thailand
2nd place, silver medalist(s)	Vietnam
3rd place, bronze medalist(s)	Indonesia
4	Myanmar
5	Timor-Leste

2011 Women's SEA Games champions

Thailand

=== Medalists ===
Event	Gold	Silver	Bronze
Men	Thailand; Jirayu Raksakaew; Kitsada Somkane; Kittikun Sriutthawong; Montri Vaenpradab; Nattapong Kesapan; Piyarat Toontupthai; Saranchit Charoensuk; Shotivat Tivsuwan; Teerasak Nakprasok; Wanchai Tabwises; Yamine Traore; Yuranan Buadang	Indonesia; Adi Sucipto; Affan Priyo Wicaksono; Agung Seganti; Andri; Antho Bertiyawan; Ayip Rizal; Bagus Wahyu Ardyanto; I Nyoman Rudi Tirtana; Mahfud Nurcahyadi; Ramzil Huda; Septiohadi; Veleg Dhany Ristan Krisnawan	Vietnam; Bùi Văn Hải; Đặng Vũ Bôn; Giang Văn Đức; Huỳnh Văn Tuấn; Lê Bình Giang; Lê Quang Khánh; Lưu Đình Toàn; Ngô Văn Kiều; Nguyễn Hoàng Thương; Nguyễn Hữu Hà; Nguyễn Xuân Thanh; Phạm Thái Hưng
Women	Thailand; Amporn Hyapha; Kamonporn Sukmak; Malika Kanthong; Nootsara Tomkom; Onuma Sittirak; Piyanut Pannoy; Pleumjit Thinkaow; Rasamee Supamool; Tapaphaipun Chaisri; Utaiwan Kaensing; Wanitchaya Luangtonglang; Wanna Buakaew; Wilavan Apinyapong	Vietnam; Đào Thị Huyền; Đinh Thị Hương; Đinh Thị Trà Giang; Đỗ Thị Minh; Hà Thị Hoa; Nguyễn Thị Kim Liên; Nguyễn Thị Ngọc Hoa; Nguyễn Thị Thu Hòa; Nguyễn Thị Xuân; Phạm Thị Kim Huệ; Phạm Thị Yến; Tạ Thị Diệu Linh	Indonesia; Agustin Wulandhari; Amalia Fajrina Nabila; Berlian Marsheilla; Gunarti Indahyani; Lailatul Aisyah; Maya Kurnia Indri Sari; Maya Puspita Widiastuty; Nety Dyah Puspitarini; Novia Andriyanti; Tiara Putri Anggraeni; Wilda Siti Murfadhilah Sugandi; Yunita Sari Ayu Iddha

== Beach ==
=== Medalists ===
Event	Gold	Silver	Bronze
Men	Indonesia; Andy Ardiyansah; Koko Prasetyo Darkuncoro	Indonesia; Dian Putra Sentosa; Ade Candra Rachmawan	Thailand; Kittipat Yungtin; Teerapat Pollueang
Women	Thailand; Kamoltip Kulna; Varapatsorn Radarong	Indonesia; Ayu Cahyaning Siam; Dhita Juliana	Thailand; Jarunee Sannok; Usa Tenpaksee
