= Volleyball at the 2017 SEA Games =

- Venue: Malaysia International Trade & Exhibition Centre
- Location: Kuala Lumpur, Malaysia
- Dates: 21–27 August 2017
- Nations: 8

Volleyball at the 2017 SEA Games in Kuala Lumpur were held at Malaysia International Trade & Exhibition Centre in Kuala Lumpur from 21 to 27 August 2017.

The 2017 Games will feature competitions in two events.

== Competition schedule ==
The following was the competition schedule for the volleyball competitions:

P	Preliminaries	½	Semifinals	B	3rd place play-off	F	Final

Event	Mon 21	Tue 22	Wed 23	Thu 24	Fri 25	Sat 26	Sun 27	
Men	P	P	P	P	P	½	B	F
Women			P	P	P	½	B	F

== Participation ==
=== Participating nations ===
==== Men's tournament ====
- Cambodia
- Indonesia
- Malaysia
- Myanmar
- Philippines
- Thailand
- Timor-Leste
- Vietnam

==== Women's tournament ====
- Indonesia
- Malaysia
- Myanmar
- Philippines
- Thailand
- Vietnam

== Men's competition ==
=== Preliminary round ===
==== Group A ====
Pos	Team	Pld	W	L	Pts	SW	SL	SR	SPW	SPL	SPR	Qualification
1	Thailand	3	3	0	9	9	0	MAX	236	184	1.283	Semifinals
2	Myanmar	3	2	1	5	6	5	1.200	250	240	1.042	Semifinals
3	Malaysia	3	1	2	4	5	6	0.833	257	252	1.020	
4	Cambodia	3	0	3	0	0	9	0.000	163	230	0.709	

==== Group B ====
Pos	Team	Pld	W	L	Pts	SW	SL	SR	SPW	SPL	SPR	Qualification
1	Indonesia	3	3	0	9	9	1	9.000	259	187	1.385	Semifinals
2	Vietnam	3	2	1	6	6	3	2.000	214	168	1.274	Semifinals
3	Philippines	3	1	2	3	4	6	0.667	235	225	1.044	
4	Timor-Leste	3	0	3	0	0	9	0.000	97	225	0.431	

=== Final round ===
Semi-finals
26 Aug
Thailand	3
Vietnam	2
26 Aug
Indonesia	3
Myanmar	2

Final
27 Aug
Thailand	3
Indonesia	1
Third place
27 Aug
Vietnam	3
Myanmar	0

== Women's competition ==
=== Preliminary round ===
==== Group A ====
Pos	Team	Pld	W	L	Pts	SW	SL	SR	SPW	SPL	SPR	Qualification
1	Thailand	2	2	0	6	6	0	MAX	150	75	2.000	Semifinals
2	Indonesia	2	1	1	3	3	3	1.000	119	107	1.112	Semifinals
3	Myanmar	2	0	2	0	0	6	0.000	63	150	0.420	

==== Group B ====
Pos	Team	Pld	W	L	Pts	SW	SL	SR	SPW	SPL	SPR	Qualification
1	Vietnam	2	2	0	6	6	0	MAX	151	94	1.606	Semifinals
2	Philippines	2	1	1	3	3	3	1.000	134	121	1.107	Semifinals
3	Malaysia	2	0	2	0	0	6	0.000	80	150	0.533	

=== Final round ===
Semi-finals
26 Aug
Thailand	3
Philippines	0
26 Aug
Indonesia	3
Vietnam	2

Final
27 Aug
Thailand	3
Indonesia	0
Third place
27 Aug
Philippines	1
Vietnam	3

== Medal summary ==
=== Medal table ===
* Host nation (Malaysia)

Rank	Nation	Gold	Silver	Bronze	Total
1	Thailand	2	0	0	2
2	Indonesia	0	2	0	2
3	Vietnam	0	0	2	2
Totals (3 entries)		2	2	2	6

=== Medalists ===
Event	Gold	Silver	Bronze
Men's tournament	Thailand (THA); Anuchit Pakdeekaew; Chakkit Chandahuadong; Jirayu Raksakaew; Kantapat Koonmee; Kissada Nilsawai; Kitisak Saengsee; Kitsada Somkane; Kittikun Sriutthawong; Kittinon Namkhunthod; Mawin Maneewong; Montri Puanglib; Saranchit Charoensuk	Indonesia (INA); Agung Seganti; Aji Maulana; Antho Bertiyawan; Delly Dwi Putra Heryanto; Dio Zulfikri; Doni Haryono; Hernanda Zulfi; Mahfud Nurcahyadi; Ramzil Huda; Rendy Febriant Tamamilang; Rivan Nurmulki; Sigit Ardian	Vietnam (VIE); Giang Văn Đức; Hoàng Văn Phương; Huỳnh Trung Trực; Lê Thành Hạc; Ngô Văn Kiều; Nguyễn Hoàng Thương; Nguyễn Trường Giang; Nguyễn Vũ Hoàng; Nguyễn Xuân Thành; Phạm Thái Hưng; Từ Thanh Thuận; Vũ Hồng Quân
Women's tournament	Thailand (THA); Ajcharaporn Kongyot; Chatchu-on Moksri; Hattaya Bamrungsuk; Jarasporn Bundasak; Nootsara Tomkom; Pimpichaya Kokram; Piyanut Pannoy; Pleumjit Thinkaow; Pornpun Guedpard; Tapaphaipun Chaisri; Tichaya Boonlert; Wilavan Apinyapong	Indonesia (INA); Aprilia Santini Manganang; Asih Titi Pangestuti; Berlian Marshella; Hany Budiarty; Megawati Hangestri Pertiwi; Nandita Ayu Salsabila; Novia Andriyanti; Putri Andya Agustina; Tri Retno Mutiara Lutfi; Wilda Nurfadhilah; Yolana Betha Pangestika; Yolla Yuliana	Vietnam (VIE); Bùi Thị Ngà; Bùi Vũ Thanh Tuyền; Đinh Thị Thúy; Đoàn Thị Xuân; Hà Ngọc Diễm; Lê Thanh Thúy; Nguyễn Linh Chi; Nguyễn Thị Hồng Đào; Nguyễn Thị Kim Liên; Nguyễn Thị Ngọc Hoa; Phạm Thị Kim Huệ; Trần Thị Thanh Thúy

== See also ==
- Sitting volleyball at the 2017 ASEAN Para Games
