= Jakraprop Saengsee =

Thai volleyball player (born 1995)

Personal information
- Full name: Cha Akat Tri Jakraprop Saengsee
- Nickname: Bom
- Nationality: Thai
- Born: January 16, 1995 (age 31); Kamphaeng Phet, Thailand
- Height: 1.90 m (6 ft 3 in)
- Weight: 85 kg (187 lb)
- Spike: 340 cm (11 ft 2 in)
- Block: 305 cm (10 ft 0 in)

Volleyball information
- Position: Opposite Hitter
- Current club: Kohkood Cabana
- Number: 14

National team
2016–2019, 2023	Thailand
Honours
Men's volleyball
Representing Thailand
Southeast Asian Games
Gold medal – first place	2017 Kuala Lumpur	Team

Jakraprop Saengsee (Thai: จักรภพ แสงสี) (former name Kitisak Saengsee, born 16 January 1995) is a member of the Thailand men's national volleyball team.

== Clubs ==
- (Thailand) Chonburi (2014–2016)
- (Thailand) Air Force (2016–2019)
- (Thailand) Diamond Food (2019–2021)
- (Thailand) Kohkood Cabana (2023–2026)

== Awards ==
=== Clubs ===
- 2015–16 Thailand League - Bronze Medal, with Chonburi E-Tech Air Force
- 2016–17 Thailand League - Champion, with Air Force
- 2017 Thai–Denmark Super League - Runner-up, with Air Force
- 2017–18 Thailand League - Champion, with Air Force
- 2017–18 Thailand League - Champion, with Air Force
- 2019 Thai–Denmark Super League - Runner-Up, with Air Force
- 2020 Thailand League - Runner-Up, with Diamond Food
- 2020–21 Thailand League - Runner-Up, with Diamond Food
