= Teerasak Nakprasong =

Thai volleyball player (born 1985)

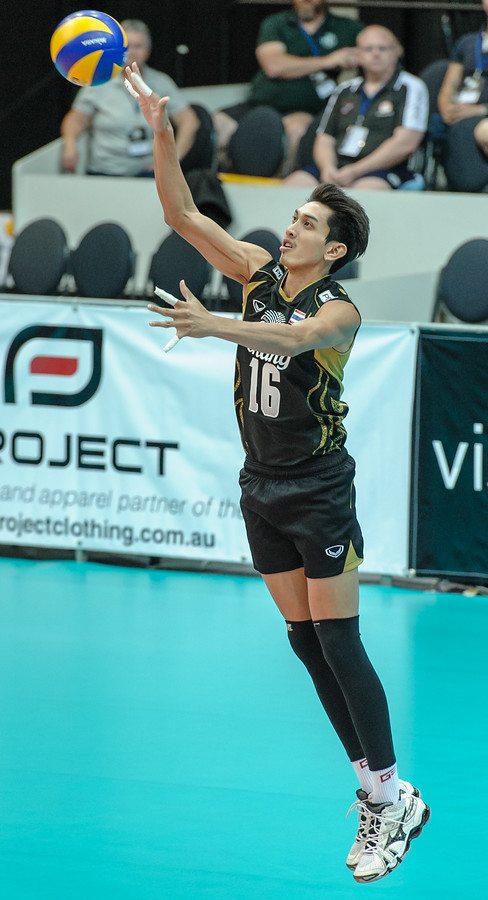
- Teerasak in the 2014 World Championship qualification

Personal information
- Full name: Teerasak Nakprasong
- Nickname: Au
- Born: November 6, 1985 (age 40); Pitsanulok, Thailand
- Height: 1.88 m (6 ft 2 in)
- Weight: 75 kg (165 lb)
- Spike: 320 cm (10 ft 6 in)
- Block: 310 cm (10 ft 2 in)

Volleyball information
- Position: Middle blocker
- Number: 16

National team
2011–2015	Thailand
Honours
Men's volleyball
Representing Thailand
Southeast Asian Games
Gold medal – first place	2011 Palembang/Jakarta	Team
Gold medal – first place	2013 Naypyidaw	Team
Gold medal – first place	2015 Singapore	Team

Teerasak Nakprasong (Thai: ธีรศักดิ์ นาคประสงค์, RTGS: Thirasak Nakprasong; born November 6, 1985) is a member of the Thailand men's national volleyball team.

== Clubs ==
- (Thailand) Phetchaburi (2008–2009)
- (Thailand) Chakungrao Armed Forces (2009–2010)
- (Thailand) Chonburi (2010–2012)
- (Thailand) Krungkao (2012–2014)
- (Thailand) Phitsanulok (2015–2018)
- (Thailand) Diamond Food (2018–2020)

== Awards ==
=== Clubs ===
- 2011–12 Thailand League - Champion, with Chonburi
- 2015–16 Thailand League - Champion, with Wing 46 Phitsanulok
- 2015 Thai-Denmark Super League - Runner-Up, with Phitsanulok
- 2016 Thai-Denmark Super League - Third, with Phitsanulok
- 2017–18 Thailand League - Third, with Phitsanulok
- 2018–19 Thailand League - Runner-Up, with Saraburi
- 2019 Thai–Denmark Super League - Third, with Saraburi

== Royal decoration ==
- 2015 – Gold Medalist (Sixth Class) of The Most Admirable Order of the Direkgunabhorn
