= Saranchit Charoensuk =

Thai volleyball player (born 1987)

Personal information
- Full name: Saranchit Charoensuk
- Nickname: Max
- Born: July 20, 1987 (age 39); Ratchaburi, Thailand
- Height: 1.81 m (5 ft 11 in)
- Weight: 74 kg (163 lb)
- Spike: 331 cm (10 ft 10 in)
- Block: 301 cm (9 ft 11 in)

Volleyball information
- Position: Setter
- Current club: Taichung Win Streak
- Number: 17

National team
2008–2015, 2017–2019, 2023–2024	Thailand
Honours
Men's volleyball
Representing Thailand
Southeast Asian Games
Silver medal – second place	2009 Vientiane	Team
Gold medal – first place	2011 Palembang/Jakarta	Team
Gold medal – first place	2013 Naypyidaw	Team
Gold medal – first place	2015 Singapore	Team
Gold medal – first place	2017 Kuala Lumpur	Team

Saranchit Charoensuk (Thai: สราญจิตต์ เจริญสุข, born July 20, 1987) is a member of the Thailand men's national volleyball team.

== Clubs ==
- (Thailand) Suphan Buri (2005–2006)
- (Thailand) Nakhon Sawan (2011–2012)
- (Thailand) Suan Dusit (2012–2013)
- (Thailand) Sisaket–Suan Dusit (2013–2014)
- (Thailand) Chonburi E-Tech Air Force (2014–2015)
- (Thailand) Air Force (2016–2017)
- (Thailand) Nakhon Ratchasima (2017–2025)
- (Taiwan) Taichung Win Streak (2024–2027)

== Awards ==
=== Individuals ===
- 2008 Asian Cup "Best Setter"
- 2016–17 Thailand League "Best Setter"
- 2018–19 Thailand League "Best Setter"
- 2022–23 Thailand League "Best Setter"
- 2023–24 Thailand League "Best Setter"

=== Clubs ===
- 2012–13 Thailand League - Runner-up, with Suandusit
- 2014–15 Thailand League - Runner-up, with Chonburi E-Tech Air Force
- 2015 Thai–Denmark Super League - Champion, with Chonburi E-Tech Air Force
- 2016–17 Thailand League - Champion, with Air Force
- 2017 Thai–Denmark Super League - Runner-up, with Air Force
- 2017–18 Thailand League - Champion, with Nakhon Ratchasima
- 2018 Thai–Denmark Super League - Third, with Nakhon Ratchasima
- 2019 Thai–Denmark Super League - Champion, with Nakhon Ratchasima
- 2024–25 Thailand League - Champion, with Nakhon Ratchasima
