= Anuchit Pakdeekaew =

Thai volleyball player (born 1996)

Personal information
- Full name: Anuchit Pakdeekaew
- Nickname: Nu
- Nationality: Thai
- Born: 29 September 1996 (age 30); Kalasin, Thailand
- Height: 1.92 m (6 ft 4 in)
- Weight: 95 kg (209 lb)
- Spike: 325 cm (128 in)
- Block: 315 cm (124 in)

Volleyball information
- Position: Middle Blocker
- Current club: Diamond Food
- Number: 12

National team
2014–2026	Thailand
Honours
Men's volleyball
Representing Thailand
Southeast Asian Games
Gold medal – first place	2017 Kuala Lumpur	Team
Bronze medal – third place	2019 Philippines	Team
Gold medal – first place	2025 Bangkok	Team

Anuchit Pakdeekaew (Thai: อนุชิต ภักดีแก้ว; born 29 September 1996) is a member of the Thailand men's national volleyball team who plays as a Middle Blocker.

== Clubs ==
- (Thailand) Nongkungsriwittayakan School (2013)
- (Thailand) Krungkao Air Force (2014–2015)
- (Thailand) Chonburi (2015–2016)
- (Thailand) Air force (2016–2021)
- (Thailand) Diamond Food (2021–present)

== Awards ==
=== Individual ===
- 2018–19 Thailand League "Best Middle Blocker"
- 2023–24 Thailand League "Best Middle Blocker"
- 2024–25 Thailand League "Best Middle Blocker"

=== Clubs ===
- 2015–16 Thailand League - 3rd place, with Chonburi E-Tech Air Force
- 2016–17 Thailand League - Champion, with Air Force
- 2017 Thai–Denmark Super League - Runner-up, with Air Force
- 2017–18 Thailand League - Champion, with Air Force
- 2018 Thai–Denmark Super League - Champion, with Air Force
- 2017–18 Thailand League - Champion, with Air Force
- 2019 Thai–Denmark Super League - Runner-Up, with Air Force
- 2022–23 Thailand League - 3rd place, with Diamond Food
- 2023–24 Thailand League - Runner-Up, with Diamond Food
- 2026 Thailand League - Runner-Up, with Diamond Food
