= Kittikun Sriutthawong =

Thai volleyball player (born 1986)

Personal information
- Full name: Phan Cha Akat Ek Kittikun Sriutthawong
- Nickname: Kaek
- Born: January 10, 1986 (age 40); Sa Kaeo, Thailand
- Height: 1.94 m (6 ft 4 in)
- Weight: 80 kg (180 lb)
- Spike: 338 cm (11 ft 1 in)
- Block: 306 cm (10 ft 0 in)

Volleyball information
- Position: Outside hitter
- Number: 9 (National Team), 10 (Club)

National team
2006–2018	Thailand
2021	Thailand (women), Coach
2025–2026	Thailand (women), Assistant coach
Honours
Men's volleyball
Representing Thailand
Southeast Asian Games
Bronze medal – third place	2007 Nakhon Ratchasima	Team
Silver medal – second place	2009 Vientiane	Team
Gold medal – first place	2011 Palembang/Jakarta	Team
Gold medal – first place	2013 Naypyidaw	Team
Gold medal – first place	2015 Singapore	Team
Gold medal – first place	2017 Kuala Lumpur	Team

Kittikun Sriutthawong (Thai: กิตติคุณ ศรีอุทธวงศ์; RTGS: Kittikhun Si-utthawong, born 3 August 1986) is a former member of the Thailand men's national volleyball team. He is currently manager of the club Diamond Food Volleyball Club.

== Career ==
Kittikun played on loan with the club Air Force for the 2017 season. Kittikun is currently the coach of Thailand women's national volleyball team (2021 Nations League squad). He is currently manager of the club Diamond Food Volleyball Club.

== Education ==
He got a bachelor's degree from Phra Nakorn Rajabhat University and a master's degree from Sripatum University.

== Clubs ==
- (Thailand) Phitsanulok (2005–2007)
- (Thailand) Phetchabun (2007–2009)
- (Thailand) Chakungrao - Armed Forces (2009–2010)
- (Thailand) Chonburi (2011–2015)
- (Vietnam) Ho Chi Minh City (2012) (loan)
- (Thailand) Phitsanulok (2015–2016)
- (Thailand) NK Fitness Samutsakhon (2016–2018)
- (Thailand) Air Force (2017)
- (Thailand) Diamond Food Saraburi (2018–2022)

== As Staff member ==
Season	Team	Position
2016–2024	(Thailand) PEA Sisaket (Women)	Assistant coach
2021	Thailand (Women)	Head coach
2021–2024	(Thailand) Diamond Food - Fine Chef (Women)	Head coach
2024–2025	(Thailand) Diamond Food Fine Chef Samut Sakhon	Assistant coach
2025–2026	Thailand (Women)	Assistant coach
2025–2026	(Thailand) PEA Sisaket (Women)	Assistant coach

== Awards ==
=== Individual ===
- 2006 Thailand League "Best scorer"
- 2010–11 Thailand League "Most valuable player"
- 2010–11 Thailand League "Best spiker"
- 2014 Thai-Denmark Super League "Most valuable player"
- 2014–15 Thailand League "Best outside hitters"
- 2015 Thai-Denmark Super League "Most valuable player"
- 2015–16 Thailand League "Most valuable player"
- 2016–17 Thailand League "Most valuable player"
- 2016–17 Thailand League "Best outside spikers"
- 2020 Thailand League "Best outside spikers"
- 2020–21 Thailand League "Best outside spikers"

=== Clubs ===
- 2008–09 Thailand League - Champion, with Phetchabun
- 2009–10 Thailand League - Champion, with Chakungrao - Armed Forces
- 2010–11 Thailand League - Champion, with Chonburi
- 2011–12 Thailand League - Champion, with Chonburi
- 2012–13 Thailand League - Bronze medal, with Chonburi
- 2013–14 Thailand League - Runner-up, with Chonburi
- 2014–15 Thailand League - Runner-up, with Chonburi
- 2014 Thai-Denmark Super League - Champion, with Chonburi
- 2015 Thai-Denmark Super League - Champion, with Chonburi
- 2015–16 Thailand League - Champion, with Wing 46 Phitsanulok
- 2017 Thai–Denmark Super League - Bronze medal, with NK Fitness Samutsakhon
- 2018 Thai–Denmark Super League - Runner-Up, with Visakha
- 2018–19 Thailand League - Runner-Up, with Saraburi
- 2019 Thai–Denmark Super League - Third, with Saraburi
- 2020 Thailand League - Runner-Up, with Diamond Food Saraburi
- 2021–22 Thailand League - Champion, with Diamond Food Saraburi

== Royal decorations ==
- 2015 – Gold Medalist (Sixth Class) of The Most Admirable Order of the Direkgunabhorn
- 2013 – Commander (Third Class) of The Most Exalted Order of the White Elephant
