= 2014–15 Men's Volleyball Thailand League =

- League: Volleyball Thailand League
- Sport: Volleyball
- Duration: October 25, 2014 – March 22, 2015
- Games: 56
- Teams: 8
- Season champions: Nakhon Ratchasima (3rd title)
- Season MVP: (Thailand) Wanchai Tabwises

Men's Volleyball Thailand League seasons
- ← 2013–14 2015–16 →

The Volleyball Thailand League is the highest level of Thailand club volleyball in the 2014–15 season and the 10th edition.

== Team ==
1. Cosmo Chiang Rai
2. Chonburi E-tech Air Force
3. Kasetsart
4. Krungkao Air Force
5. Nakhon Ratchasima
6. Nakhonnont-Suandusit
7. Wing 46 Toyota–Phitsanulok
8. Phetchaburi–Bangkok

== Ranking ==
| Pos | Team | Pld | W | L | Pts | SW | SL | SR | SPW | SPL | SPR |
|---|---|---|---|---|---|---|---|---|---|---|---|
| 1 | Nakhon Ratchasima | 14 | 13 | 1 | 38 | 39 | 11 | 3.545 | 1155 | 980 | 1.179 |
| 2 | Chonburi E-Tech Air Force | 14 | 12 | 2 | 35 | 38 | 10 | 3.800 | 1155 | 980 | 1.179 |
| 3 | Wing 46 Toyota-Phitsanulok | 14 | 11 | 3 | 34 | 38 | 16 | 2.375 | 1251 | 1128 | 1.109 |
| 4 | Kasetsart | 14 | 6 | 8 | 15 | 19 | 30 | 0.633 | 1022 | 1143 | 0.894 |
| 5 | Cosmo Chiang Rai | 14 | 4 | 10 | 14 | 21 | 34 | 0.618 | 1159 | 1271 | 0.912 |
| 6 | Krungkao Air Force | 12 | 4 | 8 | 12 | 18 | 33 | 0.545 | 1139 | 1184 | 0.962 |
| 7 | Nakhonnont-Suan Dusit | 14 | 4 | 10 | 12 | 15 | 31 | 0.484 | 1004 | 1093 | 0.919 |
| 8 | Phetchaburi-Bangkok | 13 | 2 | 11 | 8 | 15 | 35 | 0.429 | 1040 | 1182 | 0.880 |

== Round 1 ==
| Date | Time | | Score | | Set 1 | Set 2 | Set 3 | Set 4 | Set 5 | Total | Report |
|---|---|---|---|---|---|---|---|---|---|---|---|
| 25 Oct | 16:00 | Nakhon Ratchasima | 3–0 | Phetchaburi-Bangkok | 25–13 | 25–22 | 25–14 | | | 75–49 | Report |
| 26 Oct | 14:00 | Cosmo Chiang Rai | 3–1 | Kasetsart | 19–25 | 25–17 | 27–25 | 25–15 | | 96–82 | Report |
| 26 Oct | 16:00 | Chonburi | 3–2 | Wing 46 Toyota-Phitsanulok | 23–25 | 23–25 | 25–19 | 25–11 | 15–11 | 111–91 | Report |
| 01 Nov | 14:00 | Nakhonnont-Suan Dusit | 3–0 | Krungkao Air Force | 28–26 | 25–22 | 25–17 | | | 78–65 | Report |
| 01 Nov | 16:00 | Nakhon Ratchasima | 3–0 | Kasetsart | 25–17 | 25–17 | 25–16 | | | 75–50 | Report |
| 02 Nov | 16:00 | Chonburi | 3–1 | Phetchaburi-Bangkok | 23–25 | 25–11 | 25–19 | 25–16 | | 98–71 | Report |
| 08 Nov | 13:00 | Nakhonnont-Suan Dusit | 1–3 | Cosmo Chiang Rai | 25–20 | 26–28 | 20–25 | 20–25 | | 91–98 | Report |
| 08 Nov | 14:00 | Kasetsart | 0–3 | Chonburi | 19–25 | 22–25 | 22–25 | | | 63–75 | Report |
| 09 Nov | 16:00 | Nakhon Ratchasima | 3–1 | Wing 46 Toyota-Phitsanulok | 23-25 | 25-16 | 25-21 | 25-23 | | 98–0 | Report |
| 16 Nov | 16:00 | Wing 46 Toyota-Phitsanulok | 3–0 | Nakhonnont-Suan Dusit | 25–16 | 25–17 | 25–20 | | | 75–53 | Report |
| 16 Nov | 13:00 | Krungkao Air Force | 0–3 | Kasetsart | 22–25 | 25–27 | 23–25 | | | 70–77 | Report |
| 16 Nov | 14:00 | Cosmo Chiang Rai | 1–3 | Chonburi | 23–25 | 18–25 | 25–19 | 23–25 | | 89–94 | Report |
| 22 Nov | 16:00 | Wing 46 Toyota-Phitsanulok | 3-0 | Kasetsart | 25–22 | 25–21 | 25–22 | | | 75–65 | |
| 23 Nov | 13:00 | Krungkao Air Force | 0–3 | Chonburi | 20–25 | 21–25 | 21–25 | | | 62–75 | |
| 23 Nov | 14:00 | Phetchaburi-Bangkok | 1–3 | Cosmo Chiang Rai | 23–25 | 20–25 | 25–20 | 21–25 | | 89–95 | |
| 30 Nov | 13:00 | Krungkao Air Force | 1–3 | Wing 46 Toyota-Phitsanulok | 25–20 | 18–25 | 23–25 | 17-25 | | 83–70 | |
| 30 Nov | 14:00 | Phetchaburi-Bangkok | 3–1 | Nakhonnont-Suan Dusit | 25–21 | 25–23 | 23–25 | 25-22 | | 98–69 | |
| 30 Nov | 16:00 | Nakhon Ratchasima | 3–0 | Cosmo Chiang Rai | 25-21 | 25–22 | 25–11 | | | 75–33 | |
| 05 Dec | 14:00 | Phetchaburi-Bangkok | 3–1 | Krungkao Air Force | 25-23 | 25-19 | 23-25 | 25-22 | | 98–0 | |
| 06 Dec | 13:00 | Kasetsart | 3–0 | Nakhonnont-Suan Dusit | 25-21 | 25-22 | 31-29 | | | 81–0 | |
| 06 Dec | 16:00 | Chonburi | 3–0 | Nakhon Ratchasima | 25-20 | 25-21 | 25-22 | | | 75–0 | |
| 07 Dec | 14:00 | Wing 46 Toyota-Phitsanulok | 3–2 | Cosmo Chiang Rai | 23-25 | 25-15 | 25-23 | 23-25 | 15-9 | 111–0 | |
| 20 Dec | 13:00 | Kasetsart | 3–2 | Phetchaburi-Bangkok | 25-22 | 28-30 | 25-23 | 18-25 | 15-8 | 111–0 | |
| 21 Dec | 16:00 | Chonburi | 3–0 | Nakhonnont-Suan Dusit | 25-14 | 25-17 | 26-24 | | | 76–0 | |
| 21 Dec | 16:00 | Krungkao Air Force | 0–3 | Nakhon Ratchasima | 38-40 | 23-25 | 14-25 | | | 75–0 | |
| 27 Dec | 14:00 | Phetchaburi-Bangkok | 1–3 | Wing 46 Toyota-Phitsanulok | 25-27 | 18-25 | 25-13 | 13-25 | | 81–0 | |
| 28 Dec | 14:00 | Cosmo Chiang Rai | 1–3 | Krungkao Air Force | 18-25 | 25-22 | 24-26 | 19-25 | | 86–0 | |
| 28 Dec | 16:00 | Nakhonnont-Suan Dusit | 0–3 | Nakhon Ratchasima | 23-25 | 17-25 | 19-25 | | | 59–0 | |

== Round 2 ==
| Date | Time | | Score | | Set 1 | Set 2 | Set 3 | Set 4 | Set 5 | Total | Report |
|---|---|---|---|---|---|---|---|---|---|---|---|
| 25 Jan | 13:00 | Kasetsart | 3–2 | Cosmo Chiang Rai | 18-25 | 20-25 | 25-20 | 25-17 | 15-12 | 103–0 | |
| 25 Jan | 16:00 | Wing 46 Toyota-Phitsanulok | 3–1 | Chonburi | 26-24 | 22-25 | 25-21 | 25-19 | | 98–0 | |
| 24 Jan | 14:00 | Phetchaburi-Bangkok | 1–3 | Nakhon Ratchasima | 10-25 | 25-19 | 22-25 | 18-25 | | 75–0 | |
| 28 Jan | 13:00 | Krungkao Air Force | 3–0 | Nakhonnont 3BB-Suan Dusit | 25-18 | 25-23 | 25-17 | | | 75–0 | |
| 31 Jan | 14:00 | Phetchaburi-Bangkok | 0–3 | Chonburi E-Tech Air Force | 14-25 | 17-25 | 22-25 | | | 53–0 | |
| 01 Feb | 13:00 | Kasetsart | 0–3 | Nakhon Ratchasima | 17-25 | 11-25 | 16-25 | | 44-75 | 88–0 | |
| 01 Feb | 14:00 | Cosmo Chiang Rai | 1–3 | Nakhonnont 3BB-Suan Dusit | 19-25 | 25-19 | 19-25 | 23-25 | | 86–0 | |
| 07 Feb | 15:00 | Nakhonnont 3BB-Suan Dusit | 1–3 | Wing 46 Toyota-Phitsanulok | 23-25 | 25-19 | 22-25 | 19-25 | | 89–0 | |
| 08 Feb | 14:00 | Cosmo Chiang Rai | 1–3 | Nakhon Ratchasima | 18-25 | 26-24 | 20-25 | 14-25 | | 78–0 | |
| 08 Feb | 16:00 | Chonburi E-Tech Air Force | 3–0 | Kasetsart | 25-20 | 25-16 | 25-19 | | | 75–0 | |
| 11 Feb | 13:00 | Krungkao Air Force | 3–2 | Phetchaburi-Bangkok | 23-25 | 23-25 | 25-22 | 25-20 | 15-6 | 111–0 | |
| 14 Feb | 15:00 | Nakhonnont 3BB-Suan Dusit | 3–0 | Phetchaburi-Bangkok | 25-23 | 25-19 | 29-27 | | | 79–0 | |
| 15 Feb | 13:00 | Kasetsart | 3–2 | Krungkao Air Force | 25-21 | 23-25 | 26-24 | 18-25 | 15-11 | 107–0 | |
| 15 Feb | 16:00 | Chonburi E-Tech Air Force | 3–0 | Cosmo Chiang Rai | 25-22 | 25-19 | 25-18 | | | 75–0 | |
| 21 Feb | 16:00 | Nakhon Ratchasima | 3–1 | Chonburi E-Tech Air Force | 25-21 | 25-22 | 25-27 | 25-17 | | 100–0 | |
| 22 Feb | 13:00 | Krungkao Air Force | 3–0 | Cosmo Chiang Rai | 25-19 | 25-13 | 25-20 | | | 75–0 | |
| 22 Feb | 13:00 | Kasetsart | 0–3 | Wing 46 Toyota-Phitsanulok | 16-25 | 23-25 | 17-25 | | | 56–0 | |
| 28 Feb | 14:00 | Phetchaburi-Bangkok | 0–3 | Kasetsart | 23-25 | 24-26 | 22-25 | | | 69–0 | |
| 28 Feb | 16:00 | Nakhon Ratchasima | 3–1 | Krungkao Air Force | 28-26 | 25-21 | 24-26 | 25-17 | | 102–0 | |
| 01 Mar | 14:00 | Cosmo Chiang Rai | 0–3 | Wing 46 Toyota-Phitsanulok | 24-26 | 14-25 | 22-25 | | | 60–0 | |
| 01 Mar | 15:00 | Nakhonnont 3BB-Suan Dusit | 0–3 | Chonburi E-Tech Air Force | 18-25 | 23-25 | 14-25 | | | 55–0 | |
| 04 Mar | 16:00 | Wing 46 Toyota-Phitsanulok | 3–1 | Krungkao Air Force | 25-17 | 23-25 | 25-11 | 25-21 | | 98–0 | |
| 07 Mar | 15:00 | Nakhonnont 3BB-Suan Fusit | 3–0 | Kasetsart | 25-19 | 25-14 | 25-17 | | | 75–0 | |
| 14 Mar | 15:00 | Cosmo Chiang Rai | 3–1 | Phetchaburi-Bangkok | 25-18 | 23-25 | 25-21 | 25-18 | | 98–0 | |
| 15 Mar | 16:00 | Chonburi E-Tech Air Force | 3–0 | Krungkao Air Force | 25-21 | 25-23 | 25-22 | | | 75–0 | |
| 15 Mar | 16:00 | Wing 46 Toyota-Phitsanulok | 2–3 | Nakhon Ratchasima | 22-25 | 25-23 | 25-20 | 21-25 | 18-20 | 111–0 | |
| 21 Mar | 16:00 | Nakhon Ratchasima | 3–0 | Nakhonnont 3BB-Suan Dusit | 25–20 | 25–14 | 25–21 | | | 75–55 | |
| 22 Mar | 16:00 | Wing 46 Toyota-Phitsanulok | 3–0 | Phetchaburi-Bangkok | 27–25 | 25–19 | 25–15 | | | 77–59 | |

== Final standing ==
| Rank | Team |
|---|---|
| 1st place, gold medalist(s) | Nakhon Ratchasima |
| 2nd place, silver medalist(s) | Chonburi E-tech Air Force |
| 3rd place, bronze medalist(s) | Wing 46 Toyota-Phitsanulok |
| 4 | Kasetsart |
| 5 | Cosmo Chiang Rai |
| 6 | Krungkao Air Force |
| 7 | Nakhonnont-Suan Dusit |
| 8 | Phetchaburi-Bangkok |

| Qualified for the 2015 Thai-Denmark Super League |
| Relegated to Group 2 |

== Awards ==
| Award | Winner | Team |
|---|---|---|
| MVP | (Thailand) Wanchai Tabwises | Nakhon Ratchasima |
| Best Outside Hitters | (Thailand) Wanchai Tabwises | Nakhon Ratchasima |
| Best Outside Hitters | (Thailand) Kittikun Sri-utthawong | Chonburi E-Tech Air Force |
| Best Opposite Hitter | (Thailand) Somporn Wannaprapa | Nakhonnont 3BB-Suandusit |
| Best Middle Blockers | (Thailand) Kittinon Namkhunthod | Nakhonnont 3BB-Suandusit |
| Best Middle Blockers | (Thailand) Supachai Prachon | Cosmo Chiang Rai |
| Best setter | (Thailand) Yossapol Wattana | Cosmo Chiang Rai |
| Best libero | (Thailand) Piyarat Tunthaphai | Chonburi E-Tech Air Force |
