= Mawin Maneewong =

Thai volleyball player (born 1996)

Personal information
- Full name: Cha Akat Tri Mawin Maneewong
- Nickname: Pond
- Nationality: Thai
- Born: 5 November 1996 (age 29); Bangkok, Thailand
- Height: 1.93 m (6 ft 4 in)
- Weight: 82 kg (181 lb)
- Spike: 325 cm (128 in)
- Block: 310 cm (120 in)

Volleyball information
- Position: Setter
- Current club: (Thailand) Kohkood Cabana
- Number: 6

National team
2016–2019, 2022–2023	Thailand
Honours
Men's volleyball
Representing Thailand
Southeast Asian Games
Gold medal – first place	2017 Southeast Asian Games
Bronze medal – third place	2019 Southeast Asian Games

Mawin Maneewong (Thai: มาวิน มณีวงษ์; born 5 November 1996) is a member of the Thailand men's national volleyball team who plays as a setter.

== Clubs ==
- (Thailand) Chonburi (2014–2016)
- (Thailand) Air force (2016–2021)
- (Thailand) Phitsanulok (2021–2023)
- (Thailand) Kohkood Cabana (2023–2026)

== Awards ==
=== Individual ===
- 2021–22 Thailand League "Best Setter"

=== Clubs ===
- 2015–16 Thailand League - Bronze Medal, with Chonburi E-Tech Air Force
- 2016–17 Thailand League - Champion, with Air Force
- 2017 Thai–Denmark Super League - Runner-up, with Air Force
- 2017–18 Thailand League - Champion, with Air Force
- 2018 Thai–Denmark Super League - Champion, with Air Force
- 2018–19 Thailand League - Champion, with Air Force
- 2019 Thai–Denmark Super League - Runner-Up, with Air Force
- 2021–22 Thailand League - Runner-up, with Phitsanulok
