= Phitsanulok Volleyball Club =

Thai volleyball club

Rajamangala Lanna Phitsanulok
- Full name: RMUTL Phitsanulok
- Nickname: Phitsanulok
- Founded: 2005
- Ground: Indoor Stadium Sport Center; Pibulsongkram Rajabhat University; Phitsanulok, Thailand
- Chairman: (Thailand) Takool Nakornthan
- Manager: (Thailand) Kampon Sripho
- League: Thailand League
- 2019–20: 3rd place ▲2

Uniforms
Home	Away

Rajamangala Lanna Phitsanulok is a male professional volleyball team based in Phitsanulok, Thailand. The club plays in the Thailand league.

== Honours ==
=== Domestic competitions ===
- Thailand League
  - Champion (1): 2015–16
  - Runner-up (1): 2021–22
  - Third (6): 2014–15, 2017–18, 2019–20, 2020–21, 2022–23, 2023–24
- Thai-Denmark Super League
  - Runner-up (1): 2015
  - Third (3): 2016, 2017, 2019

=== International competitions ===
- Asian Club Championship 1 appearances
  - 2016 — 11th place

== League results ==
League		Position	Teams	Matches	Win	Lose
Thailand League
Thailand League	2013–14	7th place	8	14	1	13
Thailand League	2014–15	3rd place	8	14	11	3
Thailand League	2015–16	Champion	8	14	12	2
Thailand League	2016–17	5th place	8	14	6	8
Thailand League	2017–18	3rd place	8	14	11	3
Thailand League	2017–18	5th place	8	13	8	5
Thailand League	2019–20	3rd place	8	19	7	12
Thailand League	2020–21	3rd place	8	18	9	9
Thailand League	2021–22	Runner-up	8	17	10	7
Thailand League	2022–23	3rd place	8	17	10	7
Thailand League	2023–24	3rd place	8	17	10	7

== Former names ==
- Phitsanulok (2005–2008)
- Wing 46 Toyota-Phitsanulok (2013–2014)
- Wing 46 Phitsanulok (2014–2015)
- Diamond Food RMUTL Phitsanulok (2016–2018)
- Rajamangala Lanna Phitsanulok (2018–)

== Current squad ==
As of January 2018

Number	Player	Position	Height (m)	Birth date
1	(Thailand) Nutthawut Sriboon	Setter	1.76	22 March 2000 (age 26)
2	(Thailand) Phasert Pinkaew	Middle Blocker	1.88	30 November 1997 (age 28)
3	(Thailand) Amorntep Konhan (c)	Opposite	1.86	6 October 1995 (age 30)
4	(Thailand) Anut Promjan	Opposite	1.94	13 June 1997 (age 29)
6	(Thailand) Pasith Sukaew	Opposite	1.92	11 March 2003 (age 23)
7	(Thailand) Nattapol Klaharn	Opposite	1.77	13 November 1991 (age 34)
8	(Thailand) Kittithad Nuwaddee	Opposite	1.88	26 May 1998 (age 28)
9	(Thailand) Narongrit Janpirom	Setter	1.80	16 July 1997 (age 29)
10	(Thailand) Chatchawan Janchuen	Middle Blocker	1.86	18 May 2000 (age 26)
11	(Thailand) Siwadon Sanhatham	Libero	1.87	12 December 1997 (age 28)
12	(Thailand) Boonchai Chuetawanngam	Libero	1.68	16 October 2001 (age 24)
13	(Thailand) Nattaphon Kambao	Outside Hitter	1.82	10 April 1995 (age 31)
14	(Thailand) Chinathip Pangkaew	Outside Hitter	1.83	9 September 2001 (age 25)
16	(Thailand) Chayut Kongruen	Middle Blocker	1.93	29 April 2001 (age 25)
20	(Thailand) Aekkawee Bamgsri	Middle Blocker	1.88	30 May 1998 (age 28)
23	(Thailand) Thawatchai Meekhan	Opposite	1.80	28 December 1989 (age 36)

== Notable players ==
Domestic Players

Thailand

- Kitsada Somkane
- Kittikun Sriutthawong
- Ratchapoom Samthong
- Supachai Sriphum
- Supachai Prachong
- Santi Somsook
- Kritsada Sri-ngam
- Anuchai Thongsit
- Apisit Matta
- Thammapat Anantakan
- Anut Promchan
- Thanasak Pasanate
- Aekkawee Bangsri
- Jakkapong Tongklang
- Anurak Chantong-on
- Kiatisuk khanliwut
- Kittinon Namkhuntod
- Teerasak Nakprasong
- Adipong Phonpinyo
- Montri Puanglib

Foreigner Players

United States

- Connor Dougherty

Canada

- Steven Hunt
- Jasmin Cull
- Terrel Bramwell

Brazil

- Luiz Perezto
- Pablo Femando
