= 2016–17 Men's Volleyball Thailand League =

- League: Thailand League
- Sport: Volleyball
- Duration: November 19, 2016 – March 19, 2017
- Games: 56
- Teams: 8
- Season champions: Air Force (1st title)

Men's Volleyball Thailand League seasons
- ← 2015–16 2017–18 →

The 2016–17 Volleyball Thailand League was the 12th season of the Thai League, the top Thai professional league for association volleyball clubs, since its establishment in 2005. A total of 8 teams competed in the league. The season started on 19 November 2016.

Wing 46 Phitsanulok are the defending champions, having won the Volleyball Thailand League title the previous season.

== Team ==
- Nakhon Ratchasima The Mall
- NK Fitness Samutsakhon
- Diamond Food RMUTL Phitsanulok
- Sisaket
- RSU VC
- Air Force
- Kasetsart
- Koh Kood Cabana Ratchaburi

=== Foreign players ===
2016–17 Men's Volleyball Thailand League foreign players
Team	Player 1	Player 2
Nakhon Ratchasima The Mall	(Myanmar) Aung Thu	—N/a
NK Fitness Samutsakhon	—N/a	—N/a
Diamond Food RMUTL Phitsanulok	(Canada) Teylor Hunt	(Canada) Jasmin Cull
Sisaket	—N/a	—N/a
Koh Kood Cabana Ratchaburi	(Myanmar) Thwin Htoo Zin	(Myanmar) Kyaw Kyaw Htwe
Air Force	—N/a	—N/a
Kasetsart	—N/a	—N/a
Rangsit University VC	(Hong Kong) Henry Chan	—N/a

== Ranking ==
Pos	Team	Pld	W	L	Pts	SW	SL	SR	SPW	SPL	SPR	Qualification or relegation
1	Air Force	14	12	2	35	39	12	3.250	1194	1030	1.159	Asian Championship
2	Nakhon Ratchasima The Mall	14	12	2	34	38	11	3.455	1187	951	1.248	
3	Koh Kood Cabana Ratchaburi	14	9	5	28	32	19	1.684	1189	1111	1.070	
4	NK Fitness Samutsakhon	14	9	5	28	31	19	1.632	1196	1101	1.086	
5	Diamond Food RMUTL Phitsanulok	14	6	8	20	23	26	0.885	1108	1095	1.012	
6	Kasetsart	14	4	10	12	15	31	0.484	964	1095	0.880	
7	Sisaket	14	4	10	11	14	34	0.412	1001	1134	0.883	Relegated to Division 2
8	RSU VC	14	0	14	0	2	42	0.048	764	1097	0.696	Relegated to Division 2

=== Result table ===
Home \ Away	AFV	DIM	KSU	KCR	NAK	NKF	RSU	SIS
Air Force		3–0	3–0	3–2	2–3	3–1	3–0	3–0
Diamond Food RMUTL Phitsanulok	0–3		0–3	0–3	2–3	3–0	3–0	3–0
Kasetsart	0–3	1–3		0–3	1–3	0–3	3–1	1–3
Koh Kood Cabana Ratchaburi	2–3	3–2	3–0		0–3	1–3	3–0	3–0
Nakhon Ratchasima The Mall	1–3	3–0	3–0	3–0		1–3	3–0	3–0
NK Fitness Samutsakhon	3–1	3–1	3–0	1–3	0–3		3–0	3–0
Rangsit University	0–3	0–3	1–3	0–3	0–3	0–3		0–3
Sisaket	0–3	1–3	0–3	1–3	0–3	3–2	3–1	

Updated to match(es) played on 19 March 2017. Source:
Legend: Blue = home team win; Yellow = draw; Red = away team win.

== Results ==
=== Round 1 ===
Date	Time		Score		Set 1	Set 2	Set 3	Set 4	Set 5	Total	Report
19 Nov	16:00	RSU VC	0–3	NK Fitness Samutsakhon	16–25	20–25	15–25			51–75	
19 Nov	16:00	Air Force	2–3	Nakhon Ratchasima The Mall	25–23	18–25	23–25	25–21	4–15	95–109	
20 Nov	16:00	Kasetsart	1–3	Sisaket	15–25	25–22	14–25	18–25		72–97	
20 Nov	16:00	Koh Kood Cabana Ratchaburi	3–2	Diamond Food RMUTL Phitsanulok	33–31	20–25	26–24	22–25	15–13	116–118	

Date	Time		Score		Set 1	Set 2	Set 3	Set 4	Set 5	Total	Report
26 Nov	16:00	Diamond Food RMUTL Phitsanulok	2–3	Nakhon Ratchasima The Mall	25–23	25–22	13–25	19–25	13–15	95–110	
26 Nov	16:00	Sisaket	3–2	NK Fitness Samutsakhon	26–28	25–23	18–25	28–26	15–13	112–115	
27 Nov	16:00	Air Force	3–2	Koh Kood Cabana Ratchaburi	25–17	25–16	16–25	28–30	15–11	109–99	
27 Nov	19:00	RSU VC	0–3	Kasetsart	12–25	26–28	23–25			61–78	

Date	Time		Score		Set 1	Set 2	Set 3	Set 4	Set 5	Total	Report
3 Dec	16:00	Nakhon Ratchasima The Mall	3–0	Kasetsart	25–17	25–20	25–18			75–55	
3 Dec	16:00	Koh Kood Cabana Ratchaburi	3–0	Sisaket	25–18	34–32	25–23			84–73	
4 Dec	16:00	Diamond Food RMUTL Phitsanulok	3–0	RSU VC	25–18	25–15	25–19			75–52	
4 Dec	16:00	NK Fitness Samutsakhon	3–1	Air Force	25–20	25–20	25–27	25–19		100–86	

Date	Time		Score		Set 1	Set 2	Set 3	Set 4	Set 5	Total	Report
10 Dec	16:00	Nakhon Ratchasima The Mall	3–0	RSU VC	25–13	25–18	25–12			75–43	
10 Dec	16:00	Sisaket	0–3	Air Force	19–25	14–25	21–25			54–75	
10 Dec	16:00	Kasetsart	1–3	Diamond Food RMUTL Phitsanulok	18–25	25–23	17–25	18–25		78–98	
11 Dec	16:00	Koh Kood Cabana Ratchaburi	1–3	NK Fitness Samutsakhon	29–31	13–25	25–19	22–25		89–100	

Date	Time		Score		Set 1	Set 2	Set 3	Set 4	Set 5	Total	Report
18 Dec	16:00	NK Fitness Samutsakhon	0–3	Nakhon Ratchasima The Mall	21–25	23–25	21–25			65–75	
18 Dec	16:00	Diamond Food RMUTL Phitsanulok	3–0	Sisaket	28–26	25–19	25–22			78–67	
21 Dec	16:00	RSU VC	0–3	Air Force	21–25	12–25	12–25			45–75	
21 Dec	16:00	Kasetsart	0–3	Koh Kood Cabana Ratchaburi	26–28	27–29	17–25			70–82	

Date	Time		Score		Set 1	Set 2	Set 3	Set 4	Set 5	Total	Report
24 Dec	16:00	Sisaket	3–1	RSU VC	25–21	21–25	25–14	25–15		96–75	
25 Dec	16:00	Air Force	3–0	Diamond Food RMUTL Phitsanulok	25–20	26–24	25–17			76–61	
25 Dec	16:00	NK Fitness Samutsakhon	3–0	Kasetsart	25–17	25–22	25–16			75–55	
25 Dec	16:00	Koh Kood Cabana Ratchaburi	0–3	Nakhon Ratchasima The Mall	23–25	20–25	15–25			58–75	

Date	Time		Score		Set 1	Set 2	Set 3	Set 4	Set 5	Total	Report
7 Jan	16:00	Kasetsart	0–3	Air Force	19–25	16–25	23–25			58–75	
7 Jan	16:00	Nakhon Ratchasima The Mall	3–0	Sisaket	25–8	25–16	25–18			75–42	
8 Jan	16:00	RSU VC	0–3	Koh Kood Cabana Ratchaburi	12–25	15–25	17–25			44–75	
8 Jan	16:00	Diamond Food RMUTL Phitsanulok	3–0	NK Fitness Samutsakhon	25–20	27–25	25–15			77–60	

=== Round 2 ===
Date	Time		Score		Set 1	Set 2	Set 3	Set 4	Set 5	Total	Report
22 Jan	18:30	Nakhon Ratchasima The Mall	1–3	NK Fitness Samutsakhon	25–21	31–33	25–27	28–30		109–111	
22 Jan	15:30	Sisaket	1–3	Diamond Food RMUTL Phitsanulok	12–25	15–25	25–23	18–25		70–98	
22 Jan	15:30	Koh Kood Cabana Ratchaburi	3–0	Kasetsart	25–13	25–19	25–22			75–54	

Date	Time		Score		Set 1	Set 2	Set 3	Set 4	Set 5	Total	Report
28 Jan	15:30	Sisaket	0–3	Nakhon Ratchasima The Mall	11–25	18–25	19–25			48–75	
28 Jan	18:30	NK Fitness Samutsakhon	3–1	Diamond Food RMUTL Phitsanulok	25–22	25–20	22–25	25–22		97–89	
29 Jan	15:30	Koh Kood Cabana Ratchaburi	3–0	RSU VC	25–16	25–15	25–19			75–50	
29 Jan	18:30	Air Force	3–0	Kasetsart	25–22	25–20	25–19			75–61	

Date	Time		Score		Set 1	Set 2	Set 3	Set 4	Set 5	Total	Report
4 Fed	15:30	Kasetsart	0–3	NK Fitness Samutsakhon	12–25	17–25	21–25			50–75	
4 Fed	18:30	RSU VC	0–3	Sisaket	17–25	23–25	20–25			60–75	
5 Fed	15:30	Diamond Food RMUTL Phitsanulok	0–3	Air Force	21–25	15–25	22–25			58–75	
5 Fed	18:30	Nakhon Ratchasima The Mall	3–0	Koh Kood Cabana Ratchaburi	25–20	25–19	25–22			75–61	

Date	Time		Score		Set 1	Set 2	Set 3	Set 4	Set 5	Total	Report
11 Fed	15:30	NK Fitness Samutsakhon	3–0	RSU VC	25–14	25–15	25–21			75–50	
11 Fed	15:30	Nakhon Ratchasima The Mall	1–3	Air Force	21–25	21–25	25–17	19–25		86–92	
12 Fed	15:30	Diamond Food RMUTL Phitsanulok	0–3	Koh Kood Cabana Ratchaburi	19–25	20–25	28–30			67–80	
13 Fed	15:30	Sisaket	0–3	Kasetsart	16–25	22–25	28–30			66–80	

Date	Time		Score		Set 1	Set 2	Set 3	Set 4	Set 5	Total	Report
18 Fed	18:30	Nakhon Ratchasima The Mall	3–0	Diamond Food RMUTL Phitsanulok	25–14	25–23	25–23			75–60	
19 Fed	18:30	Kasetsart	3–1	RSU VC	21–25	25–18	25–20	25–20		96–83	
19 Fed	15:30	NK Fitness Samutsakhon	3–0	Sisaket	25–20	25–22	27–25			77–67	
19 Fed	15:30	Koh Kood Cabana Ratchaburi	2–3	Air Force	25–23	25–22	23–25	23–25	9–15	105–110	

Date	Time		Score		Set 1	Set 2	Set 3	Set 4	Set 5	Total	Report
5 Mar	18:30	Air Force	3–0	RSU VC	25–15	25–13	25–15			75–43	

Date	Time		Score		Set 1	Set 2	Set 3	Set 4	Set 5	Total	Report
11 Mar	18:30	RSU VC	0–3	Nakhon Ratchasima The Mall	14–25	13–25	14–25			41–75	
12 Mar	15:30	Diamond Food RMUTL Phitsanulok	0–3	Kasetsart	23–25	17–25	20–25			60–75	
12 Mar	18:30	Air Force	3–0	Sisaket	25–21	25–17	25–19			75–57	
12 Mar	15:30	NK Fitness Samutsakhon	1–3	Koh Kood Cabana Ratchaburi	22–25	16–25	25–19	22–25		85–94	

Date	Time		Score		Set 1	Set 2	Set 3	Set 4	Set 5	Total	Report
18 Mar	18:30	Kasetsart	1–3	Nakhon Ratchasima The Mall	25–23	21–25	19–25	17–25		82–98	
19 Mar	15:30	Air Force	3–1	NK Fitness Samutsakhon	25–21	19–25	27–25	27–25		98–96	
19 Mar	18:30	RSU VC	0–3	Diamond Food RMUTL Phitsanulok	17–25	25–27	21–25			63–77	
19 Mar	15:30	Sisaket	1–3	Koh Kood Cabana Ratchaburi	17–25	25–20	16–25	20–25		78–95	

== Final standing ==
Rank	Team
1st place, gold medalist(s)	Air Force
2nd place, silver medalist(s)	Nakhon Ratchasima The Mall
3rd place, bronze medalist(s)	Koh Kood Cabana Ratchaburi
4	NK Fitness Samutsakhon
5	Diamond Food RMUTL Phitsanulok
6	Kasetsart
7	Sisaket
8	RSU VC

Qualified for the Asian Championship and Super League
Qualified for the Super League
Relegated to Division 2

2016–17 Men's Volleyball Thailand League
Air Force
1st title

Team roster
Thannarak Ruensee, Pollawat Nitkhamhan, Chanchai Jongfungklang, Prasit Piladuang, Saran Jaruwat, Pusit Phonarin, Piyarat Toontupthai, Patcharapon Puangbubpha, Anuchit Pakdeekaew, Mawin Maneewong, Kitisak Saengsee, Arnon Jaithaisong, Kantapat Koonmee, Saranchit Charoensuk, Puvapol Sopapol, Kissada Nilsawai (c)
Head coach
Padejsuk Wannachote

== Awards ==
- Most valuable player

(Thailand) Kittikun Sriutthawong
(Thailand) Wanchai Tabwises

- Best Opposite

(Thailand) Jirayu Raksakaew

- Best outside spikers

(Thailand) Kittikun Sriutthawong

- Best middle blockers

(Thailand) Wutthichai Suksala
(Thailand) Kissada Nilsawai

- Best setter

(Thailand) Saranchit Charoensuk

- Best libero

(Thailand) Tanapat Charoensuk

== See also ==
- 2016–17 Women's Volleyball Thailand League
