= Sisaket Men's Volleyball Club =

Thai volleyball club

Sisaket
- Full name: Sisaket Volleyball Club
- Nickname: Sisaket
- Ground: Wee Sommai Gymnasium; Sisaket, Thailand (Capacity: 4,000)
- Chairman: (Thailand) Sakrit Nakwarin
- Manager: (Thailand) Lorad Thonthongkam
- League: Thailand League
- 2015–16: 4th place

Sisaket Volleyball Club is a male professional volleyball team based in Sisaket, Thailand. The club plays in the Thailand league.

== Honours ==
- Thai-Denmark Super League
  - Third (2): 2015, 2016

== Former names ==
- Krungkao (2012–2014)
- Krungkao Air Force (2014–2015)
- Sisaket-Krungkao (2015–2016)
- Sisaket (2016)

== Notable players ==
Thailand

- Teerasak Nakprasong
- Natthaya Nuangdithee
- Nattapong Kesapan
- Wattanachai Worawat
- Supachai Sriphum
- Surachet Sathongwang
- Nammon Parapa
- Santichai Pamornchat
- Montri Vaenpradab
- Prasit Piladuang
- Tanarak Ruensri
- Pollawat Nitkamhan
- Phanuwat Janta
- Sutut Meekaew
- Wittaya Termsak
- Anuchit Pakdeekaew
- Ammart Suphannawong
- Artit Keawonsai
- Suttiruk Phopatee
- Wuttaporn Youdong
- Weerachon Haenthaisong
- Apipong Whoktong
- Kitsada Singam
- Auttapon Sondee
- Phuwadon Sopapon
- Kitsada Chanchai
