= Chonburi Men's Volleyball Club =

Thai volleyball club

Air Force
- Full name: Air Force
- Short name: Air Force
- Nickname: Shark Chon
- Founded: 2010
- Ground: ChonBuri Municipality Sport Stadium; Chonburi, Thailand (Capacity: 4,000)
- Chairman: (Thailand) Prasert Krinchoo
- Head coach: (Thailand) Monchai Supajirakul
- League: Thailand League
- 2015–2016: 3rd place

Uniforms
Home	Away

Air Force is a male professional volleyball team based in Chonburi, Thailand. The club was founded in 2010 and played in the Volleyball Thailand League until 2016.

== Current squad ==
The club withdrew from the Thailand League at the end of the 2015–16 season.

== Honours ==
- Domestic competitions
- Thailand League :
  - Champion (2): 2010–11,2011–12
  - Runner-up (3): 2009–2010, 2013–14, 2014–15
  - Third (2): 2012–13, 2015–16
- Thai-Denmark Super League :
  - Champion (2): 2014, 2015
  - Runner-up (1): 2016
- International competitions
- Asian Club Championship 2 appearances
  - 2012 — 5
  - 2011 — 5

== Notable players ==
Domestic Players

- (Thailand) Prasit Piladuang
- (Thailand) Teerasak Nakprasong
- (Thailand) Yossapon Wattana
- (Thailand) Kittikun Sriutthawong
- (Thailand) Kon Nanboon
- (Thailand) Pisanu Harnkhomtun
- (Thailand) Jirayu Raksakaew
- (Thailand) Kissada Nilsawai
- (Thailand) Puvapol Sopapol
- (Thailand) Saranchit Charoensuk
- (Thailand) Kantapat Koonmee
- (Thailand) Arnon Jaithaisong
- (Thailand) Kitisak Saengsee
- (Thailand) Mawin Maneewong
- (Thailand) Anuchit Pakdeekaew
- (Thailand) Artit Kaewaonsai
- (Thailand) Piyarat Toontupthai
- (Thailand) Pusit Phonarin
- (Thailand) Khanit Sinlapasorn
- (Thailand) Chatmongkol Pragadkaew
- (Thailand) Nattapong Kesapan
- (Thailand) Pollawat Nitkhamhan

Foreigner Players

- (Myanmar) Kyaw Kyaw Htway
- (Myanmar) Aung Thu
- (Brazil) Pablo Fenandu
