= Air Force Men's Volleyball Club =

Thai volleyball club

Air Force Volleyball Club
- Full name: Air Force
- Short name: Air Force
- Nickname: Blue Eagle
- Founded: 2016
- Ground: Chandrubeksa Stadium; Don Mueang District, Bangkok, Thailand (Capacity: 4,000)
- Chairman: (Thailand) Suppakorn Jitreekan
- Head coach: (Thailand) Sonthi Bunruang
- Captain: (Thailand) Mawin Maneewong
- League: Thailand League
- 2020–2021: 5th place ▼1

Uniforms
Home	Away

Air Force is a male professional volleyball team based in Don Mueang District, Bangkok, Thailand. The club was founded in 2016 and plays in the Volleyball Thailand League. The club took the place of Chonburi E-Tech Air Force, which played in the league from 2010–2016.

== Honours ==
- Domestic competitions
- Thailand League :
  - Champion (2): 2016–17, 2018–19
  - Runner-up (1): 2017–18
- Thai-Denmark Super League :
  - Champion (1): 2018
  - Runner-up (2): 2017, 2019
- Academy League U18 Thailand League
  - Champion (1): 2017
- International competitions
- Asian Club Championship 2 appearances
  - 2019 — Est colar representative
  - 2017 — 9th
- Hoa Lu Cup 1 appearances
  - 2016 — Champion

== League results ==
League		Position	Teams	Matches	Win	Lose
Thailand League
Thailand League	2016–17	Champion	8	14	12	2
Thailand League	2017–18	Runner-up	8	14	12	2
Thailand League	2018–19	Champion	8	16	13	4
Thailand League	2019–20	4th place	8	19	7	12
Thailand League	2020–21	5th place	8	12	6	6

== Current squad ==
As of December 2020

- Head coach: (Thailand) Sonthi Boonrueng

Team roster 2019–20
No.	Name	Position	Height (m)	Date of birth	Country
1	Kittipong Paingam				Thailand
2	Thongpoon	Outside hitter	1.77	9 July 2000 (age 26)	Thailand
3	Piyawat Aeksriri				Thailand
4	Worachot Insaen				Thailand
5	Nanthapat Prommanee	Middle blocker	1.95	6 April 1996 (age 30)	Thailand
6	Mawin Maneewong (c)	Setter	1.93	5 November 1996 (age 29)	Thailand
7	Tinnawat Inkaew				Thailand
8	Pusit Phonarin	Opposite	1.83	3 January 1997 (age 29)	Thailand
9	Piyarat Tunthapthai	Libero	1.72	10 December 1987 (age 38)	Thailand
10	Kritthisak Ngaosungnuen				Thailand
11	Santi Ponwiangchan				Thailand
12	Anuchit Pakdeekaew	Middle-Blocker	1.90	29 July 1996 (age 30)	Thailand
14	Theerapol Jantarasena	Opposite	1.98	8 December 1998 (age 27)	Thailand
16	Watcharachai Paengjit	Opposite spiker	1.90		Thailand
17	Watcharet Thadee	Outside hitter	1.87	10 October 1999 (age 27)	Thailand
18	Patinya Chaiocha				Thailand
19	Anuchai Thongsick	Setter	1.78		Thailand
21	Santi Somsuk	Libero	1.77	31 July 1992 (age 34)	Thailand

== Head coach ==
Season	Name	Country
2018–2019	Padejsuk Wannachot	Thailand
2019–Present	Anucha Srisook	Thailand

== Imports ==
Season	Number	Player	Country
2016–17	18	Henry Chan	(Hong Kong) Hongkong
2017–18	4	Janitha Surath	Sri Lanka
2017–18	7	Kanybek Uulu Onelbek	Kyrgyzstan
2018–19
2018–19	5	Yosuke Arai	Japan
2018–19	22	Roman Shirov	Kyrgyzstan
2018–19	24	Janitha Surath	Sri Lanka
2019–20
2019–20	15	Temir Musa Uulu	Kyrgyzstan
2019–20	17	Muhammad Waseem	Pakistan

== Notable players ==
Domestic Players

Thailand

- Jirayu Raksakaew (loan)
- Kittikun Sriutthawong (loan)
- Montri Vaenpradab (loan)
- Yuranan Buadang (loan)
- Saranchit Charoensuk
- Yutthakarn Boonrat
- Piyarat Tunthapthai
- Saran Jaruwat
- Pacharaphon Phoungbubpa
- Kissada Nilsawai
- Jakraprop Saengsee
- Kantapat Koonmee

Foreigner Players

Hong Kong

- Henry Chan (2016)

Japan

- Yosuke Arai (2018)

Kyrgyzstan

- Kanybek Uulu Onelbek (2017–2018)
- Roman Shirov (2018–2019)
- Temir Musa Uulu (2019–2020)

Sri Lanka

- Janitha Surath (2017–2018,2019)

Pakistan

- Muhammad Waseem (2019–2020)
