= 2014 Men's Volleyball Thai-Denmark Super League =

Tournament details
- Host country: MCC Hall of The Mall Bangkapi Bangkok, Thailand
- Dates: 8–12 May 2014
- Teams: 6
- Venue: 1 (in 1 host city)

Final positions
- Champions: Chonburi E-Tech Air Force (1st title)

Tournament awards
- MVP: (Thailand) Kittikun Sriutthawong

2014 Men's Volleyball Thai-Denmark Super League (Thai: วอลเลย์บอลชายไทยเดนมาร์คซูเปอร์ลีก 2014) was the first edition of the tournament. It was held at the MCC Hall of The Mall Bangkapi in Bangkok, Thailand from 8 to 12 May 2014.

== Teams ==
- Kasetsart
- Krungkao Air Force
- Chonburi
- Cosmo Chiang Rai
- Nakhon Ratchasima
- Suan Dusit

== Pools composition ==
| Pool A | Pool B |
|---|---|
| Nakhon Ratchasima; Kasetsart; Suan Dusit | Chonburi E-Tech Air Force; Krungkao Air Force; Cosmo Chiang Rai |

== Preliminary round ==
=== Pool A ===
| Pos | Team | Pld | W | L | Pts | SW | SL | SR | SPW | SPL | SPR | Qualification |
|---|---|---|---|---|---|---|---|---|---|---|---|---|
| 1 | Nakhon Ratchasima | 2 | 2 | 0 | 6 | 6 | 1 | 6.000 | 169 | 147 | 1.150 | Semifinals |
| 2 | Kasetsart | 2 | 1 | 1 | 3 | 4 | 4 | 1.000 | 188 | 184 | 1.022 | Semifinals |
| 3 | Suan Dusit | 2 | 0 | 2 | 0 | 1 | 6 | 0.167 | 149 | 175 | 0.851 | |

| Date | Time | | Score | | Set 1 | Set 2 | Set 3 | Set 4 | Set 5 | Total | Report |
|---|---|---|---|---|---|---|---|---|---|---|---|
| 8 May | 11:00 | Nakhon Ratchasima | 3–1 | Kasetsart | 25–22 | 19–25 | 25–19 | 25–22 | | 94–88 | |
| 9 May | 13:00 | Kasetsart | 3–1 | Suan Dusit | 25–22 | 25–27 | 25–18 | 25–23 | | 100–90 | |
| 10 May | 14:00 | Nakhon Ratchasima | 3–0 | Suan Dusit | 25–19 | 25–21 | 25–19 | | | 75–59 | |

=== Pool B ===
| Pos | Team | Pld | W | L | Pts | SW | SL | SR | SPW | SPL | SPR | Qualification |
|---|---|---|---|---|---|---|---|---|---|---|---|---|
| 1 | Chonburi E-Tech Air Force | 2 | 2 | 0 | 6 | 6 | 0 | MAX | 150 | 108 | 1.389 | Semifinals |
| 2 | Krungkao Air Force | 2 | 1 | 1 | 2 | 3 | 5 | 0.600 | 163 | 181 | 0.901 | Semifinals |
| 3 | Cosmo Chiang Rai | 2 | 0 | 2 | 1 | 2 | 6 | 0.333 | 156 | 180 | 0.867 | |

| Date | Time | | Score | | Set 1 | Set 2 | Set 3 | Set 4 | Set 5 | Total | Report |
|---|---|---|---|---|---|---|---|---|---|---|---|
| 7 May | 13:00 | Chonburi E-Tech Air Force | 3–0 | Krungkao Air Force | 25–18 | 25–18 | 25–21 | | | 75–57 | |
| 8 May | 11:00 | Krungkao Air Force | 3–2 | Cosmo Chiang Rai | 25–20 | 19–25 | 21–25 | 25–23 | 15–13 | 105–106 | |
| 9 May | 11:00 | Chonburi E-Tech Air Force | 3–0 | Cosmo Chiang Rai | 25–15 | 25–14 | 25–21 | | | 75–50 | |

== Final round ==
Semifinals
11 May
Nakhon Ratchasima | 3
Krungkao Air Force | 1
11 May
Chonburi E-Tech Air Force | 3
Kasetsart | 1

Final
12 May
Nakhon Ratchasima | 1
Chonburi E-tech Air Force | 3
3rd place match
12 May
Krungkao Air Force | 0
Kasetsart | 3

=== Semifinals ===
| Date | Time | | Score | | Set 1 | Set 2 | Set 3 | Set 4 | Set 5 | Total | Report |
|---|---|---|---|---|---|---|---|---|---|---|---|
| 11 May | 11:00 | Nakhon Ratchasima | 3–1 | Krungkao Air Force | 28–26 | 25–20 | 19–25 | 25–23 | | 97–94 | |
| 11 May | 13:00 | Chonburi E-Tech Air Force | 3–1 | Kasetsart | 26–24 | 25–15 | 22–25 | 25–23 | | 98–87 | |

=== 3rd place match ===
| Date | Time | | Score | | Set 1 | Set 2 | Set 3 | Set 4 | Set 5 | Total | Report |
|---|---|---|---|---|---|---|---|---|---|---|---|
| 12 May | 11:30 | Krungkao Air Force | 0–3 | Kasetsart | 21–25 | 21–25 | 23–25 | | | 65–75 | |

=== Final ===
| Date | Time | | Score | | Set 1 | Set 2 | Set 3 | Set 4 | Set 5 | Total | Report |
|---|---|---|---|---|---|---|---|---|---|---|---|
| 12 May | 17:00 | Nakhon Ratchasima | 1–3 | Chonburi E-tech Air Force | 23–25 | 25–19 | 22–25 | 23–25 | | 93–94 | |

== Final standing ==
| Rank | Team |
|---|---|
| 1st place, gold medalist(s) | Chonburi E-tech Air Force |
| 2nd place, silver medalist(s) | Nakhon Ratchasima |
| 3rd place, bronze medalist(s) | Kasetsart |
| 4 | Krungkao Air Force |
| 5 | Cosmo Chiang Rai |
| 5 | Suan Dusit |

== Awards ==
- MVP: (Thailand) Kittikun Sriutthawong (Chonburi E-Tech Air Force)

== See also ==
- 2014 Women's Volleyball Thai-Denmark Super League
