= 2015–16 Men's Volleyball Thailand League =

- League: Thailand League
- Sport: Volleyball
- Duration: October 10, 2015 – March 6, 2016
- Games: 56
- Teams: 8
- Season champions: Wing 46 Phitsanulok (1st title)

Men's Volleyball Thailand League seasons
- ← 2014–15 2016–17 →

The Volleyball Thailand League is the highest level of Thailand club volleyball in the 2015–16 season and the 11th edition.

== Team ==
- Nakhon Ratchasima
- Chonburi E-Tech Air Force
- Wing 46 Phitsanulok
- Kasetsart
- Sisaket-Krungkao
- Cosmo Chiang Rai
- Ratchaburi
- Rajamangala Thanyaburi

== Ranking ==
Pos	Team	Pld	W	L	Pts	SW	SL	SR	SPW	SPL	SPR
1	Wing 46 Phitsanulok	14	12	2	37	39	10	3.900	1201	1012	1.187
2	Chonburi E-Tech Air Force	14	12	2	34	38	11	3.455	1184	964	1.228
3	Nakhon Ratchasima	14	12	2	36	37	8	4.625	1129	891	1.267
4	Sisaket-Krungkao	14	6	8	18	21	27	0.778	1138	1114	1.022
5	Ratchaburi	14	5	9	14	19	33	0.576	1118	1186	0.943
6	Kasetsart	14	5	9	13	20	35	0.571	1181	1289	0.916
7	Cosmo Chiang Rai	14	4	10	14	18	32	0.563	1050	1147	0.915
8	Rajamangala Thanyaburi	14	0	14	2	5	42	0.119	830	1151	0.721

=== Round 1 ===
Date	Time		Score		Set 1	Set 2	Set 3	Set 4	Set 5	Total	Report
10 Oct	16:00	Cosmo Chiang Rai	3–2	Sisaket-Krungkao	25–19	24–26	16–25	29–27	15–11	109–108	Report
10 Oct	16:00	Nakhon Ratchasima	3–1	Chonburi E-Tech Air Force	25–21	18–25	25–23	25–20		93–89	Report
11 Oct	16:00	Kasetsart	3–1	Rajamangala Thanyaburi	25–19	25–17	29–31	25–20		104–87	Report
11 Oct	16:00	Wing 46 Phitsanulok	3–1	Ratchaburi	25–22	20–25	25–11	25–13		95–71	Report
17 Oct	16:00	Chonburi E-Tech Air Force	1–3	Wing 46 Phitsanulok	23–25	25–27	25–16	28–30		101–98	Report
17 Oct	16:00	Nakhon Ratchasima	3–0	Ratchaburi	25–13	25–22	25–17			75–52	Report
18 Oct	16:00	Kasetsart	1–3	Sisaket-Krungkao	29–27	19–25	23–25	22–25		93–102	Report
18 Oct	16:00	Rajamangala Thanyaburi	0–3	Cosmo Chiang Rai	18–25	20–25	20–25			58–75	Report
23 Oct	16:00	Ratchaburi	3–1	Kasetsart	24–26	25–20	27–25	25–23		101–94	Report
24 Oct	16:00	Chonburi E-Tech Air Force	3–0	Cosmo Chiang Rai	25–13	25–19	25–20			75–52	Report
25 Oct	16:00	Wing 46 Phitsanulok	3–0	Rajamangala Thanyaburi	25–15	25–20	25–22			75–57	Report
25 Oct	16:00	Sisaket-Krungkao	0–3	Nakhon Ratchasima	20–25	14–25	18–25			52–75	Report
31 Oct	16:00	Rajamangala Thanyaburi	0–3	Nakhon Ratchasima	9–25	15–25	14–25			38–75	
31 Oct	16:00	Sisaket-Krungkao	0–3	Wing 46 Phitsanulok	21–25	16–25	19–25			56–75	
1 Nov	16:00	Chonburi E-Tech Air Force	3–0	Kasetsart	25–19	25–20	28–26			78–65	
15 Nov	16:00	Cosmo Chiang Rai	1–3	Ratchaburi	23–25	22–25	25–22	19–25		89–97	
21 Nov	16:00	Chonburi E-Tech Air Force	3–0	Ratchaburi	25–20	25–19	25–17			75–56	
21 Nov	16:00	Sisaket-Krungkao	3–0	Rajamangala Thanyaburi	25–20	25–11	25–21			75–52	
22 Nov	16:00	Cosmo Chiang Rai	2–3	Kasetsart	25–20	23–25	25–14	20–25	12–15	105–99	
22 Nov	16:00	Nakhon Ratchasima	3–1	Wing 46 Phitsanulok	29–27	25–21	28–30	25–18		107–96	
28 Nov	16:00	Nakhon Ratchasima	3–0	Cosmo Chiang Rai	25–16	25–22	25–19			75–57	
28 Nov	16:00	Ratchaburi	0–3	Sisaket-Krungkao	20–25	22–25	19–25			61–75	
29 Nov	16:00	Kasetsart	1–3	Wing 46 Phitsanulok	23–25	19–25	25–23	20–25		87–98	
29 Nov	16:00	Rajamangala Thanyaburi	0–3	Chonburi E-Tech Air Force	12–25	12–25	21–25			45–75	
5 Dec	16:00	Sisaket-Krungkao	0–3	Chonburi E-Tech Air Force	17–25	19–25	14–25			50–75	
6 Dec	16:00	Wing 46 Phitsanulok	3–0	Cosmo Chiang Rai	25–16	25–17	25–11			75–44	
7 Dec	16:00	Kasetsart	0–3	Nakhon Ratchasima	17–25	15–25	18–25			50–75	
7 Dec	16:00	Ratchaburi	3–2	Rajamangala Thanyaburi	25–19	25–16	23–25	19–25	15–6	107–91	

=== Round 2 ===
Date	Time		Score		Set 1	Set 2	Set 3	Set 4	Set 5	Total	Report
23 Jan	16:00	Ratchaburi	1–3	Wing 46 Phitsanulok	16–25	25–19	29–31	25–27		95–102	
23 Jan	16:00	Chonburi E-Tech Air Force	3–1	Nakhon Ratchasima	22–25	25–23	27–25	25–20		99–93	
24 Jan	16:00	Rajamangala Thanyaburi	2–3	Kasetsart	19–25	25–23	27–25	19–25	12–15	102–113	
24 Jan	16:00	Sisaket-Krungkao	3–2	Cosmo Chiang Rai	23–25	25–20	25–22	21–25	15–9	109–101	
30 Jan	16:00	Cosmo Chiang Rai	3–0	Rajamangala Thanyaburi	25–16	25–18	25–13			75–47	
31 Jan	16:00	Sisaket-Krungkao	1–3	Kasetsart	25–23	23–25	21–25	18–25		87–98	
31 Jan	16:00	Wing 46 Phitsanulok	2–3	Chonburi E-Tech Air Force	20–25	28–30	25–21	25–20	10–15	108–111	
2 Feb	16:00	Ratchaburi	0–3	Nakhon Ratchasima	14–25	25–27	12–25			51–77	
6 Feb	16:00	Rajamangala Thanyaburi	0–3	Wing 46 Phitsanulok	19–25	18–25	24–26			61–76	
6 Feb	16:00	Nakhon Ratchasima	3–0	Sisaket-Krungkao	25–18	25–16	25–13			75–47	
7 Feb	16:00	Cosmo Chiang Rai	0–3	Chonburi E-Tech Air Force	20–25	22–25	16–25			58–75	
7 Feb	16:00	Kasetsart	2–3	Ratchaburi	25–15	12–25	25–22	20–25	8–15	90–102	
10 Feb	16:00	Nakhon Ratchasima	3–0	Rajamangala Thanyaburi	25–13	25–20	25–17			75–50	
10 Feb	16:00	Ratchaburi	0–3	Cosmo Chiang Rai	25–27	27–29	15–25			67–81	
10 Feb	16:00	Wing 46 Phitsanulok	3–0	Sisaket-Krungkao	25–19	25–21	25–19			75–59	
14 Feb	16:00	Kasetsart	0–3	Chonburi E-Tech Air Force	16–25	20–25	16–25			52–75	
20 Feb	16:00	Wing 46 Phitsanulok	3–0	Nakhon Ratchasima	25–22	28–26	25–16			78–64	
20 Feb	16:00	Rajamangala Thanyaburi	0–3	Sisaket-Krungkao	18–25	24–26	19–25			61–76	
21 Feb	16:00	Ratchaburi	2–3	Chonburi E-Tech Air Force	25–17	20–25	26–24	20–25	7–15	98–106	
21 Feb	16:00	Kasetsart	3–2	Cosmo Chiang Rai	18–25	25–27	25–16	25–23	18–16	111–107	
27 Feb	16:00	Sisaket-Krungkao	3–1	Ratchaburi	22–25	25–18	25–23	25–19		97–85	
27 Feb	16:00	Chonburi E-Tech Air Force	3–0	Rajamangala Thanyaburi	25–20	25–15	25–8			75–43	
28 Feb	16:00	Wing 46 Phitsanulok	3–0	Kasetsart	25–17	25–19	25–18			75–54	
28 Feb	16:00	Cosmo Chiang Rai	0–3	Nakhon Ratchasima	18–25	16–25	17–25			51–75	
5 Mar	15:00	Chonburi E-Tech Air Force	3–0	Sisaket-Krungkao	25–17	25–15	25–22			75–54	
12 Mar	15:00	Rajamangala Thanyaburi	0–3	Ratchaburi	12–25	16–25	11–25			39–75	
13 Mar	15:00	Nakhon Ratchasima	3–1	Kasetsart	25–15	20–25	25–19	25–22		95–81	
13 Mar	15:00	Cosmo Chiang Rai	0–3	Wing 46 Phitsanulok	11–25	14–25	20–25			45–75	

== Final standing ==
Rank	Team
1st place, gold medalist(s)	Wing 46 Phitsanulok
2nd place, silver medalist(s)	Nakhon Ratchasima
3rd place, bronze medalist(s)	Chonburi E-Tech Air Force
4	Sisaket Krungkao
5	Ratchaburi
6	Kasetsart
7	Cosmo Chiang Rai
8	Rajamangala Thanyaburi

Qualified for the 2016 Asian Club Championship and 2016 Thai-Denmark Super League
Qualified for the 2016 Thai-Denmark Super League
Relegated to Group 2

== Awards ==
Award	Winner	Team
MVP	(Thailand) Kittikun Sriutthawong	Wing 46 Phitsanulok
Best spiker	(Thailand) Wanchai Tabwises	Nakhon Ratchasima
Best opposite	(Thailand) Amorntep Konhan	Wing 46 Phitsanulok
Best blocker	(Thailand) Kissada Nilsawai	Chonburi E-Tech Air Force
Best server	(Canada) Steven Hunt	Wing 46 Phitsanulok
Best setter	(Thailand) Yossapol Wattana	Cosmo Chiang Rai
Best libero	(Thailand) Thanaphat Jarernsuk	Nakhon Ratchasima

== See also ==
- 2015–16 Women's Volleyball Thailand League
