= 2015 Men's Volleyball Thai-Denmark Super League =

Tournament details
- Host country: MCC Hall of The Mall Ngamwongwan Nonthaburi, Thailand
- Dates: 26–30 March 2015
- Teams: 6
- Venue: 1 (in 1 host city)

Final positions
- Champions: Chonburi E-Tech Air Force (2nd title)

Tournament awards
- MVP: (Thailand) Kittikun Sriutthawong

2015 Men's Volleyball Thai-Denmark Super League (Thai: วอลเลย์บอลชายไทยเดนมาร์คซูเปอร์ลีก 2015) was the second edition of the tournament. It was held at the MCC Hall of The Mall Ngamwongwan in Nonthaburi, Thailand from 26 to 30 March 2015.

== Teams ==
- Kasetsart
- Chonburi E-Tech Air Force
- Wing 46 Toyota-Phitsanulok
- Nakhon Ratchasima
- Cosmo Ching Rai
- Krungkao Air Force

== Pools composition ==
Pool A	Pool B
Nakhon Ratchasima; Cosmo Ching Rai; Krungkao Air Force	Chonburi E-Tech Air Force; Kasetsart; Wing 46 Toyota-Phitsanulok

== Preliminary round ==
Qualified for the semifinals

=== Pool A ===
Pos	Team	Pld	W	L	Pts	SW	SL	SR	SPW	SPL	SPR	Qualification
1	Krungkao Air Force	2	1	1	4	6	3	2.000	209	194	1.077	Semifinals
2	Cosmo Ching Rai	2	1	1	3	5	5	1.000	210	208	1.010	Semifinals
3	Nakhon Ratchasima	2	1	1	2	4	5	0.800	191	208	0.918	

Date	Time		Score		Set 1	Set 2	Set 3	Set 4	Set 5	Total	Report
26 Mar	11:00	Nakhon Ratchasima	3–2	Cosmo Ching Rai	25–23	18–25	14–25	25–20	17–15	99–108	
27 Mar	11:00	Cosmo Ching Rai	3–2	Krungkao Air Force	25–23	25–23	19–25	18–25	15–13	102–109	
28 Mar	13:00	Nakhon Ratchasima	1–3	Krungkao Air Force	25–27	25–23	23–25	19–25		92–100	

=== Pool B ===
Pos	Team	Pld	W	L	Pts	SW	SL	SR	SPW	SPL	SPR	Qualification
1	Chonburi E-Tech Air Force	2	2	0	5	6	3	2.000	209	172	1.215	Semifinals
2	Wing 46 Toyota-Phitsanulok	2	1	1	4	5	3	1.667	174	173	1.006	Semifinals
3	Kasetsart	2	0	2	0	1	6	0.167	135	173	0.780	

Date	Time		Score		Set 1	Set 2	Set 3	Set 4	Set 5	Total	Report
26 Mar	13:00	Chonburi E-Tech Air Force	3–1	Kasetsart	25–15	25–16	23–25	25–17		98–73	
27 Mar	13:00	Kasetsart	0–3	Wing 46 Toyota-Phitsanulok	22–25	18–25	22–25			62–75	
28 Mar	11:00	Chonburi E-Tech Air Force	3–2	Wing 46 Toyota-Phitsanulok	25–27	25–19	21–25	25–18	15–10	111–99	

== Final round ==
Semifinals
29 March
Krungkao Air Force	1
Wing 46 Toyota-Phitsanulok	3
29 March
Cosmo Ching Rai	0
Chonburi E-Tech Air Force	3

Final
30 March
Wing 46 Toyota-Phitsanulok	2
Chonburi E-Tech Air Force	3

=== Semifinals ===
Date	Time		Score		Set 1	Set 2	Set 3	Set 4	Set 5	Total	Report
29 March	11:00	Krungkao Air Force	1–3	Wing 46 Toyota-Phitsanulok	22–25	25–21	16–25	22–25		85–96	
29 March	13:00	Cosmo Ching Rai	0–3	Chonburi E-Tech Air Force	20–25	22–25	19–25			61–75	

=== Final ===
Date	Time		Score		Set 1	Set 2	Set 3	Set 4	Set 5	Total	Report
30 March	11:00	Wing 46 Toyota-Phitsanulok	2–3	Chonburi E-Tech Air Force	21–25	25–22	21–25	25–21	15–13	107–106	

== Final standing ==
Rank	Team
1st place, gold medalist(s)	Chonburi E-Tech Air Force
2nd place, silver medalist(s)	Wing 46 Toyota-Phitsanulok
3rd place, bronze medalist(s)	Krungkao Air Force
3rd place, bronze medalist(s)	Cosmo Chiang Rai
5	Nakhon Ratchasima
5	Kasetsart

== See also ==
- 2015 Women's Volleyball Thai-Denmark Super League
