= Men's Volleyball Thailand League =

Top-level professional men's volleyball league in Thailand

Men's Thailand League
- Current season, competition or edition: 2024–25 Men's Volleyball Thailand League
- Sport: Volleyball
- Founded: 2005
- First season: 2005
- Administrator: Thai Volleyball Co., Ltd
- No. of teams: 8
- Country: Thailand
- Confederation: AVC
- Most recent champions: Nakhon Ratchasima (10th title)
- Most titles: Nakhon Ratchasima (10th titles)
- Broadcasters: True4U; True Sport
- Level on pyramid: 1
- Relegation to: Pro Challenge
- Domestic cups: Super League finished in 2020 season, Kor Royal Cup
- International cup: AVC Championship
- Website: thaivolleyball.co.th

Former logo

The Men's Volleyball Thailand League (Thai: วอลเลย์บอลชายไทยแลนด์ลีก) is the top-level professional men's volleyball league in Thailand. Contested by eight clubs, it operates on a system of promotion and relegation with the Volleyball Pro Challenge League. Seasons run from October to March, with teams playing 14 games each. Most games are played on Saturdays and Sundays, with a few games played on weekdays.

It is organized by the Thailand Volleyball Association (TVA). The league champion qualifies for the Asian Club Championship.

The league is recognized by the TVA, the FIVB, and the AVC. The league maintains strong ties with international volleyball governing bodies, adhering to the rules and regulations set by the FIVB and the AVC. The Women's Volleyball Thailand League is an FIVB-accredited club league, and its teams and players are registered with the FIVB. It is sponsored by Est Cola and therefore officially known as the EST Men's Volleyball Thailand League. In the Thailand League, the games are played during Saturdays and Sundays.

== Thailand League clubs (2024-25 season) ==
There are 8 clubs in the league, with two promoted teams from Pro Challenge replacing the two teams that were relegated from Thailand League following the 2023–24 season.

=== Members ===
Club	Head coach	Location	Colors	2023–24 season
Muangphon VC	(Thailand) Anuchet Dumdoungrom	Khon Kaen		TL 5th place
Royal Navy VC	(Thailand) Thanongsak Klaisuban	Pathum Thani		PC Runner-up
Nakhonratchasima College Khamtalaso	(Thailand) Anusorn Bundit	Nakhon Ratchasima		TL Sixth place
Diamond Food VC	(Thailand) Somboon Nakpung	Samut Sakhon		TL Runner-up
Nakhon Ratchasima The Mall	(Thailand) Weeramate Phergsongkror	Nakhon Ratchasima		TL Champions
RMUTL Phitsanulok	(Thailand) Kampol Sripo	Phitsanulok		TL Third place
More Asia Koh-Kood Cabana	(Thailand) Danai Sriwatcharamaytakul	Ratchaburi		TL Fourth place
PSNKK	(Thailand) Yutthana Deeraksa	Bueng Kan		PC Winner

== Foreign Players ==
The Thai League mainly allows its clubs to hire a maximum of 2 foreign players for a season. Between the 2, 1 of them must be from an Asian Volleyball Confederation nation.

An extra +1 quota is given to the clubs if they decide to sign a player from a neighbouring Southeast Asian country.

=== 2023-24 season's Foreign Players ===
2023–24 Men's Foreign Players
Club	Player	From AVC	From Southeast Asia
Muangphon VC	none	none	none
Rangsit University	none	none	none
Nakhonratchasima College Khamtalaso	none	none	none
Diamond Food VC	(Russia) Lurii kruzhkov (CSV)	(Japan) Kouhei Yanagisawa	(Indonesia) Yuda Mardiansyah Putra
Nakhon Ratchasima The Mall	(Uzbekistan) Islomjon Sobirov (AVC)	(Uzbekistan) Azizbek Kuchkorov	(Indonesia) Farhan Halim
RMUTL Phitsanulok	none	none	none
More Asia Koh-Kood Cabana	none	(Pakistan) Noman Khan	none
Kasetsart VC	(United States) Timothy Brad Davis (NORCECA)	none	none

== Results summary ==
Season	Champions	Runners-up	Third place
2025–26	Nakhon Ratchasima QminC	Diamond Food–Fine Chef	PSNKK
2024–25	Nakhon Ratchasima QminC	Diamond Food–Fine Chef	PSNKK
2023–24	Nakhon Ratchasima QminC	Diamond Food–Fine Chef	RMUTL Phitsanulok
2022–23	Nakhon Ratchasima QminC	Diamond Food–Fine Chef	RMUTL Phitsanulok
2021–22	Diamond Food–Fine Chef	RMUTL Phitsanulok	Nakhon Ratchasima QminC
2020–21	Nakhon Ratchasima The Mall	Diamond Food	RMUTL Phitsanulok
2019–20	Nakhon Ratchasima The Mall	Diamond Food	RMUTL Phitsanulok
2018–19	Air Force	Diamond Food	Visakha
2017–18	Nakhon Ratchasima	Air Force	Diamond Food Phitsanulok
2016–17	Air Force	Nakhon Ratchasima	Koh Kood Cabana Ratchaburi
2015–16	Wing 46 Phitsanulok	Nakhon Ratchasima	Chonburi E.Tech-Air Force
2014–15	Nakhon Ratchasima	Chonburi E.Tech-Air Force	Wing 46 Toyota-Phitsanulok
2013–14	Nakhon Ratchasima	Chonburi E.Tech-Air Force	Suan Dusit
2012–13	Nakhon Ratchasima	Suan Dusit	Chonburi E.Tech-Air Force
2011–12	Chonburi E.Tech-Air Force	Chiang Rai	Nakhon Sawan
2010–11	Chonburi E.Tech-Air Force	Nakhon Ratchasima	Chaiyaphum
2009–10	Chakungrao-Amed Forces	Chonburi E.Tech-Air Force	Nakhon Ratchasima
2008–09	Phetchabun	Nakhon Pathom	Suphan Buri
2007–08	Nakhon Ratchasima	Suphan Buri	Nonthaburi
2006–07	Nakhon Pathom	—N/a	Suphan Buri
2005–06	Nakhon Pathom	Saraburi	Chaiyaphum

== Champions ==
Club	Champions	Runners-up	Third place	Champion seasons
Nakhon Ratchasima Huione QminC	10	3	1	2007–08, 2012–13, 2013–14, 2014–15, 2017–18, 2019–20, 2020–21, 2022–23, 2023–24, 2024–25
Chonburi	2	4	2	2010–11, 2011–12
Nakhon Pathom	2	1	—N/a	2005–06, 2006–07
Air Force	2	1	—N/a	2016–17,2018–19
Diamond Food Fine Chef - Air Force	1	6		2021–22
Phitsanulok	1	1	6	2015–16
Chakungrao	1	—N/a	—N/a	2009–10
Phetchabun	1	—N/a	—N/a	2008–09
PSNKK	—N/a	—N/a	1	
Visakha	—N/a	—N/a	1	

== Awards ==
=== Most valuable player ===
Season	Player	Club
2024–25	(Thailand) Anurak Phanram	Nakhon Ratchasima Huione QminC
2023–24	(Uzbekistan) Islomjon Sobirov	Nakhon Ratchasima Huione QminC
2022–23	(Mongolia) Khangal Tamiraa	Nakhon Ratchasima Huione QminC
2021–22	(Thailand) Adipong Phonpinyo	Diamond Food
2020–21	(Sri Lanka) Janita Surath	Nakhon Ratchasima
2019–20	(Thailand) Wanchai Tabwises	Nakhon Ratchasima
2018–19	(Thailand) Kantapat Koonmee	Air Force
2017–18	(Myanmar) Aung Thu	Nakhon Ratchasima
2016–17	(Thailand) Kantapat Koonmee	Air Force
2015–16	(Thailand) Kittikun Sriutthawong	Wing 46 Phitsanulok
2014–15	(Thailand) Wanchai Tabwises	Nakhon Ratchasima
2013–14	(Thailand) Wanchai Tabwises	Nakhon Ratchasima

=== Best Scorer ===
Season	Player	Club
2024–25	(Thailand) Jakkrit Thanomnoi	PSNKKK
2023–24	(Uzbekistan) Islomjon Sobirov	Nakhon Ratchasima Huione QminC
2022–23	(Thailand) Kittithad Nuwaddee	Phitsanulok VC
2021–22	(Thailand) Amorntep Konhan	Phitsanulok VC
2020–21	(Thailand) Amorntep Konhan	RMUTL Phitsanulok
2019–20	(Thailand) Amorntep Konhan	RMUTL Phitsanulok
2018–19	(Thailand) Amorntep Konhan	RMUTL Phitsanulok

=== Best Opposite Spiker ===
Season	Player	Club
2024–25	(Mongolia) Khangal Tamiraa	Nakhon Ratchasima Huione QminC
2023–24	(Thailand) Amorntep Konhan	RMUTL Phitsanulok
2022–23	(Mongolia) Khangal Tamiraa	Nakhon Ratchasima Huione QminC
2021–22	(Thailand) Pusit Phonarin	Diamond Food VC
2020–21	(Thailand) Kantapat Koonmee	Diamond Food VC
2019–20	(Sri Lanka) Janita Surath	Nakhon Ratchasima The Mall
2018–19	(Thailand) Amorntep Konhan	RMUTL Phitsanulok
2017–18	(Myanmar) Aung Thu	Nakhon Ratchasima The Mall
2017–18	(Brazil) Luiz Perezto	Diamond Food Phitsanulok
2016–17	(Thailand) Jirayu Raksakaew	Kohkod Cabana Ratchaburi
2015–16	(Thailand) Amornthep Konhan	Wing 46 Phitsanulok
2014–15	(Thailand) Somporn Wannaprapa	3BB Nakornnont-Suan Dusit
2013–14	(Thailand) Nara Jankaew	Pibulsongkram Phitsanulok

=== Best Outside Spikers ===
Season	Player	Club
2024–25	(Turkey) Abdullah Çam	Diamond Food Fine Chef–Air Force VC
2024–25	(Thailand) Jakkrit Thanomnoi	PSNKK
2023–24	(Japan) Kohei Yanagisawa	Diamond Food Fine Chef–Air Force VC
2023–24	(Uzbekistan) Islomjon Sobirov	Nakhon Ratchasima Huione QminC
2022–23	(Thailand) Kittithad Nuwaddee	Phitsanulok VC
2022–23	(Thailand) Thanat Bamrungphakdi	Nakhon Ratchasima Huione QminC
2021–22	(Thailand) Kittithad Nuwaddee	Phitsanulok VC
2021–22	(Bulgaria) Miroslav Gradinarov	Diamond Food VC
2020–21	(Thailand) Kittikun Sriutthawong	Diamond Food VC
2020–21	(Thailand) Wanchai Tabwises	Nakhon Ratchasima
2019–20	(Thailand) Wanchai Tabwises	Nakhon Ratchasima
2019–20	(Thailand) Kittikun Sriutthawong	Diamond Food Saraburi
2018–19	(Thailand) Kantapat Koonmee	Air Force
2018–19	(Brazil) Douglas Bueno	Nakhon Ratchasima
2017–18	(Thailand) Kantapat Koonmee	Air Force
2017–18	(Thailand) Wanchai Tabwises	Nakhon Ratchasima
2016–17	(Thailand) Kittikun Sriutthawong	NK Fitness Samutsakhon
2016–17	(Thailand) Wanchai Tabwises	Nakhon Ratchasima
2015–16	(Thailand) Kittikun Sriutthawong	NK Fitness Samutsakhon
2015–16	(Myanmar) Aung Thu	Nakhon Ratchasima
2014–15	(Thailand) Wanchai Tabwises	Nakhon Ratchasima
2014–15	(Thailand) Kittikun Sriutthawong	Chonburi E.Tech-Air Force
2013–14	(Thailand) Wanchai Tabwises	Nakhon Ratchasima

=== Best Middle Blockers ===
Season	Player	Club
2024–25	(Thailand) Kissada Nilsawai	Nakhon Ratchasima Huione QminC
2024–25	(Thailand) Anuchit Pakdeekaew	Diamond Food Fine–Chef Air Force
2023–24	(Uzbekistan) Azizbek Kuchkorov	Nakhon Ratchasima Huione QminC
2023–24	(Thailand) Anuchit Pakdeekaew	Diamond Food Fine–Chef Air Force
2022–23	(Thailand) Prasert Pinkaew	Phitsanulok VC
2022–23	(Uzbekistan) Azizbek Kuchkorov	Nakhon Ratchasima Huione QminC
2020–21	(Thailand) Kissada Nilsawai	Diamond Food Saraburi
2020–21	(Thailand) Kittipong Suksala	Nakhon Ratchasima The Mall
2019–20	(Thailand) Kissada Nilsawai	Diamond Food Saraburi
2019–20	(Thailand) Aekkawee Bangsri	RMUTL Phitsanulok
2018–19	(Chinese Taipei) Liu Hong-Jie	Diamond Food Saraburi
2018–19	(Thailand) Anuchit Pakdeekaew	Air Force
2017–18	(Thailand) Wuttichai Suksara	Nakhon Ratchasima The Mall
2017–18	(Thailand) Kittipong Suksala	Nakhon Ratchasima The Mall
2016–17	(Thailand) Wuttichai Suksara	Nakhon Ratchasima The Mall
2016–17	(Thailand) Kissada Nilsawai	Air Force
2015–16	(Thailand) Kissada Nilsawai	Chonburi E.Tech-Air Force
2014–15	(Thailand) Kittinon Namkhunthod	3BB Nakornnont-Suan Dusit
2014–15	(Thailand) Supachai Prachon	Cosmo Chiang Rai
2013–14	(Thailand) Pongpet Namkhuntod	Sisaket-Suan Dusit

=== Best Setter ===
Season	Player	Club
2024–25	(Thailand) Boonyarid Wongtorn	Nakhon Ratchasima Huione QminC
2023–24	(Thailand) Saranchit Charoensuk	Nakhon Ratchasima Huione QminC
2022–23	(Thailand) Saranchit Charoensuk	Nakhon Ratchasima Huione QminC
2021–22	(Thailand) Mawin Maneewong	Phitsanulok VC
2020–21	(Thailand) Narongrit Janpirom	RMUTL Phitsanulok
2019–20	(Thailand) Narongrit Janpirom	RMUTL Phitsanulok
2018–19	(Thailand) Saranchit Charoensuk	Nakhon Ratchasima The Mall
2017–18	(Thailand) Saranchit Charoensuk	Nakhon Ratchasima The Mall
2016–17	(Thailand) Saranchit Charoensuk	Air Force
2015–16	(Thailand) Yossapol Wattana	Cosmo Chiang Rai
2014–15	(Thailand) Yossapol Wattana	Cosmo Chiang Rai
2013–14	(Thailand) Nattapong Kesapan	Krungkao

=== Best Server ===
Season	Player	Club
2024–25	(Turkey) Abdullah Çam	Diamond Food Fine Chef VC
2023–24	(Indonesia) Farhan Halim	Nakhon Ratchasima Huione QminC
2022–23	(Uzbekistan) Azizbek Kuchkorov	Nakhon Ratchasima Huione QminC
2021–22	(Thailand) Amorntep Konhan	RMUTL Phitsanulok
2020–21	(Brazil) André Luiz Queiroz	Diamond Food Fine Chef–Air Force VC
2019–20	(Thailand) Jirayu Raksakaew	Diamond Food Fine Chef VC
2018–19	(Chinese Taipei) Liu Hung-Min	Diamond Food Fine Chef VC
2017–18	Not Awarded	
2016–17	Not Awarded	
2015–16	(Canada) Steven Hunt	Wing 46 Phitsanulok
2014–15	Not Awarded	
2013–14	Not Awarded	

== Thailand League clubs in Asian Club Championship ==
Season	Club	Place	Awards
2025	Nakhon Ratchasima Huione QminC	5th	—N/a
2024	Nakhon Ratchasima Huione QminC	TBD	—N/a
2023	Diamond Food Fine Chef - Air Force	13th	—N/a
2022	Nakhon Ratchasima	6th	—N/a
2021	Nakhon Ratchasima	4th	Tanapat Charoensuk (Best Libero)
2021	Diamond Food	7th	—N/a
2020	Nakhon Ratchasima *	Cancelled	
2019	EST Cola *	10th	—N/a
2018	Nakhon Ratchasima	6th	—N/a
2017	Air Force	9th	—N/a
2016	Wing 46 Phitsanulok	11th	—N/a
2015	Nakhon Ratchasima	9th	—N/a

- In the 2019 EST Cola representative of Air Force
- 2020 edition is cancelled because of the Outbreak of COVID-19 pandemic in the world

== See also ==
- Women's Volleyball Thailand League
- Volleyball Thai-Denmark Super League
- Men's Volleyball Pro Challenge
