= Yuranan Buadang =

Thai volleyball player (born 1987)

Personal information
- Full name: Cha Akat Tho Yuranan Buadang
- Nickname: Sam
- Nationality: Thailand
- Born: 20 December 1987 (age 38)
- Height: 186 cm (73 in)
- Weight: 82 kg (181 lb)
- Spike: 348 cm (137 in)
- Block: 318 cm (125 in)

Volleyball information
- Position: Outside hitter
- Number: 7

Career
- Years: Team
- 2005–2020: Nakhon Ratchasima

National team
- Years: Team
- 2009–2013, 2015: Thailand
Honours
Men's volleyball
Representing Thailand
Southeast Asian Games
Silver medal – second place	2009 Vientiane	Team
Gold medal – first place	2011 Palembang/Jakarta	Team
Gold medal – first place	2013 Naypyidaw	Team

Yuranan Buadang (Thai: ยุรนันท์ บัวแดง; born 20 December 1987) is a retired Thai male volleyball player, playing as an outside hitter. He was part of the Thailand men's national volleyball team. He won the silver medal at the 2009 Southeast Asian Games. He participated at the 2010 Asian Games. On club level he played for Federbrau in 2010.

Yuranan played with the national team in 2015. He played the 2017 season on load with the Thai club Air Force.

== Clubs ==
- (Thailand) Nakhon Ratchasima (2005–2020)
- (Vietnam) Thể Công (2012) (loan)
- (Thailand) Air Force (2017)

== Awards ==
=== Clubs ===
- 2007–08 Thailand League - Champion, with Nakhon Ratchasima
- 2010–11 Thailand League - Runner-Up, with Nakhon Ratchasima
- 2012–13 Thailand League - Champion, with Nakhon Ratchasima
- 2013–14 Thailand League - Champion, with Nakhon Ratchasima
- 2014–15 Thailand League - Champion, with Nakhon Ratchasima
- 2014 Thai–Denmark Super League - Runner-Up, with Nakhon Ratchasima
- 2016 Thai–Denmark Super League - Champion, with Nakhon Ratchasima
- 2016–17 Thailand League - Runner-up, with Nakhon Ratchasima
- 2017 Thai–Denmark Super League - Champion, with Nakhon Ratchasima
- 2017–18 Thailand League - Champion, with Nakhon Ratchasima
- 2018 Thai–Denmark Super League - Third, with Nakhon Ratchasima
- 2019 Thai–Denmark Super League - Champion, with Nakhon Ratchasima

== Royal decoration ==
- 2015 – Gold Medalist (Sixth Class) of The Most Admirable Order of the Direkgunabhorn
