= 2018–19 Men's Volleyball Thailand League =

2018–19 Men's Thailand League
- League: Thailand League
- Duration: 27 October 2018 – 17 March 2019
- Games: 56 (Regular season); 4 (Finals series)
- Teams: 8

2018–2019
- Season MVP: Kantapat Koonmee

Men's Thailand League seasons
- ← 2017–18 2019–20 →

The 2018–19 Men's Volleyball Thailand League is the 14th season of the Men's Volleyball Thailand League, the top Thai professional league for men's volleyball clubs. Eight teams competed in the league. The season started on 27 October 2018.

Nakhon Ratchasima The Mall are the defending champions, also the reigning asian club champions, while the 2018 Pro Challenge champion will has entered as the promoted team from the 2018 Volleyball Pro Challenge.

== Changes from last season ==
=== Team changes ===
==== Promoted clubs ====
Promoted from the 2018 Women's Volleyball Pro Challenge

- Diamond Food Saraburi (2018 Pro Challenge champion)
- Khonkaen (2018 Pro Challenge runner-up)

==== Relegated clubs ====
Relegated from the 2017–18 Women's Volleyball Thailand League

- Kasetsart
- Khonkaen

==== Reformed club ====
- Cosmo Chiang Rai authorize from NK Fitness Samutsakorn

== Clubs ==
=== Personnel and kits ===
Team	Head coach	Team captain	Colors	Kit manufacturer	Main Sponsor
Air Force	(Thailand) Padejsuk Wannachote	(Thailand) Pattharapong Sripon		Kela	Singha
NK Fitness Samutsakorn	(Thailand) Prasert Thangmuang	(Thailand) Somkriad Sombat		Grand Sport	NK Fitness
Diamond Food Saraburi	(Thailand) Lawrach Tonthongkum	(Thailand) Kittikun Sriutthawong		Grand Sport	Diamond Food
Khonkaen	(Thailand) Lerkamhan Thongkian	(Thailand) Chinnakorn Intornpet		Grand Sport	Cho-Thavee
Nakhon Ratchasima The Mall	(Thailand) Somboon Sukonthapong	(Thailand) Wanchai Tabwises		Mizuno	The Mall
Visakha	(Thailand) Sarin Karnket	(Thailand) Kitsada Somkane		Kela	Visaka
RMUTL Phitsanulok	(Thailand) Kampol Sripoll	(Thailand) Amorntep Konhan		Grand Sport	RMUTL
Ratchaburi	(Thailand) Jarearn Janjarearnjai	(Thailand) Yutthana Deeraksa		Mizuno	Ratchaburi

=== National team players ===
Note :
(substituted off) : players who released during second leg transfer window;
(substituted on) : players who registered during second leg transfer window;
→: players who left club after registered during first or second leg.

Team	Leg	Player 1	Player 2	Player 3
Diamond Food Saraburi	1st	Jirayu Raksakaew	Kittikun Sriutthawong	Montri Puanglib
Diamond Food Saraburi	2nd	Jirayu Raksakaew	Kittikun Sriutthawong	Montri Puanglib
Nakhon Ratchasima The Mall	1st	Kittinon Namkhuntod	Saranchit Charoensuk	
Nakhon Ratchasima The Mall	2nd	Kittinon Namkhuntod	Saranchit Charoensuk	
Air Force	1st	Kissada Nilsawai		
Air Force	2nd	Kissada Nilsawai		
Visakha	1st	Kitsada Somkane		
Visakha	2nd	Kitsada Somkane		

National team player quotas except from regulation

- Amorntep Konhan is first time in national team with RMUTL Phitsanulok.
- Jakraprop Saengsee is first time in national team with Air Force.
- Mawin Maneewong is first time in national team with Air Force.
- Anuchit Pakdeekaew is first time in national team with Air Force.
- Kantapat Koonmee is first time in national team with Air Force.
- Chatmongkhon Paketkaew is first time in national team with Diamond Food Saraburi .
- Academic players will not including in national team player quota.

=== Foreign players ===
AVC players.
CAVB players.
CEV players.
CSV players.
No foreign player registered.

Note :
(substituted off) : players who released during second leg transfer window;
(substituted on) : players who registered during second leg transfer window;
→: players who left club after registered during first or second leg.

Team	Leg	Player 1	Player 2
Air Force	1st	(Kyrgyzstan) Roman Shirov (AVC)	(Japan) Yosuke Arai (AVC) (substituted off)
Air Force	2nd	(Kyrgyzstan) Roman Shirov (AVC)	(Sri Lanka) Janita Surat (AVC) (substituted on)
Nakhon Ratchasima The Mall	1st	(Brazil) Douglas Bueno (CSV)	(Brazil) Pablo Femando (CSV) (substituted off)
Nakhon Ratchasima The Mall	2nd	(Brazil) Douglas Bueno (CSV)	(Sri Lanka) Deepthi Romesh (AVC) (substituted on)
NK Fitness Samutsakorn	1st	(Japan) Daichi Yanagawa (AVC)	
NK Fitness Samutsakorn	2nd	(Japan) Daichi Yanagawa (AVC)	
Diamond Food Saraburi	1st	(Chinese Taipei) Liu Hong-Min (AVC)	(Chinese Taipei) Liu Hong-Jie (AVC)
Diamond Food Saraburi	2nd	(Chinese Taipei) Liu Hong-Min (AVC)	(Chinese Taipei) Liu Hong-Jie (AVC)
Visakha	1st	(Brazil) Rodrigo Da sill va (CSV)	(Brazil) Paulo Iuri Lamounier (CSV) (substituted off)
Visakha	2nd	(Brazil) Rodrigo Da sill va (CSV)	(China) Wu Zhai (AVC) (substituted on)

== Format ==
=== Regular season ===
- First leg: single round-robin.
- Second leg: single round-robin.

==== Regular season standing procedure ====
1. Number of matches won
2. Match points
3. Sets ratio
4. Points ratio
5. Result of the last match between the tied teams

Match won 3–0 or 3–1: 3 match points for the winner, 0 match points for the loser
Match won 3–2: 2 match points for the winner, 1 match point for the loser

== Venues ==
Bangkok	2018–19 Men's Volleyball Thailand League (Thailand)	Chonburi
MCC Hall The Mall Bangkapi ^{A}	2018–19 Men's Volleyball Thailand League (Thailand)	Chonburi Municipal Gymnasium ^{B}
Capacity: 5,000	2018–19 Men's Volleyball Thailand League (Thailand)	Capacity: 4,000
Khon Kaen	2018–19 Men's Volleyball Thailand League (Thailand)	Nakhon Ratchasima
KICE ^{C}	2018–19 Men's Volleyball Thailand League (Thailand)	Liptapanlop Hall
Capacity: 4,000	2018–19 Men's Volleyball Thailand League (Thailand)	Capacity: 2,000
Nakhon Ratchasima	2018–19 Men's Volleyball Thailand League (Thailand)	Nonthaburi
MCC Hall The Mall Korat	2018–19 Men's Volleyball Thailand League (Thailand)	MCC Hall The Mall Ngamwongwan
Capacity: 5,000	2018–19 Men's Volleyball Thailand League (Thailand)	Capacity: 5,000

Note
^A Keelawes 1 Gymnasium is initiatively proposed venue in Week 4 (17 to 18 November 2018), but TVA moved venue to Mcc Hall The Mall Bangkapi.
^B Chonburi Municipal Gymnasium is initiatively proposed venue in Week 5 (1 to 2 December 2018), but TVA moved venue to Mcc Hall The Mall Bangkapi.
^C Khon Kaen Provincial Gymnasium is initiatively proposed venue in Week 6 and 7 (15 to 16 and 22 to 23 December 2018), but TVA moved venue to Khonkaen International Convention and Exhibition Center.

== Regular season ==
=== League table ===
Pos	Team	Pld	W	L	Pts	SW	SL	SR	SPW	SPL	SPR	Qualification
1	Diamond Food Saraburi	14	13	1	36	40	13	3.077	1243	1046	1.188	Qualification to Finals series and Super League; Possible qualification to Asian Club Championship
2	Nakhon Ratchasima The Mall	14	10	4	29	32	14	2.286	1076	937	1.148	Qualification to Finals series and Super League; Possible qualification to Asian Club Championship
3	Air Force	14	9	5	29	33	17	1.941	1152	1009	1.142	Qualification to Finals series and Super League; Possible qualification to Asian Club Championship
4	Visakha	14	9	5	28	32	20	1.600	1175	1079	1.089	Qualification to Finals series and Super League; Possible qualification to Asian Club Championship
5	RMUTL Phitsanulok	14	9	5	27	31	21	1.476	1149	1120	1.026	
6	NK Fitness Samutsakorn	14	4	10	13	17	31	0.548	1002	1098	0.913	
7	Ratchaburi	14	1	13	3	8	41	0.195	964	1173	0.822	Relegation to Pro League
8	Khonkaen	14	1	13	3	5	41	0.122	825	1128	0.731	Relegation to Pro League

=== Head-to-Head results ===
Leg 1
Home \ Away	AIF	NKF	DFS	KKN	NMA	VSK	RLK	RBR
Air Force		3–0	1–3	3–0	2–3	1–3	3–1	3–0
NK Fitness Samutsakorn	0–3		2–3	3–0	0–3	0–3	1–3	3–0
Diamond Food Saraburi	3–1	3–2		3–0	3–1	3–0	3–0	3–0
Khonkaen	0–3	0–3	0–3		0–3	0–3	0–3	3–2
Nakhon Ratchasima The Mall	3–2	3–0	1–3	3–0		3–0	0–3	3–0
Visakha	3–1	3–0	0–3	3–0	0–3		2–3	3–0
RMUTL Phitsanulok	1–3	3–1	1–3	3–0	3–0	3–2		3–1
Ratchaburi	0–3	0–3	0–3	2–3	0–3	0–3	1–3	

Legend: Blue = home team win; Yellow = draw; Red = away team win.

Leg 2
Home \ Away	AIF	NKF	DFS	KKN	NMA	VSK	RLK	RBR
Air Force		3–0	2–3	3–0	0–3	3–1	3–0	3–0
NK Fitness Samutsakorn	0–3		1–3	3–0	0–3	1–3	0–3	3–1
Diamond Food Saraburi	3–2	3–1		3–0	3–0	3–2	3–0	3–0
Khonkaen	0–3	0–3	0–3		0–3	0–3	0–3	2–3
Nakhon Ratchasima The Mall	3–0	3–0	0–3	3–0		1–3	3–0	3–0
Visakha	1–3	3–1	2–3	3–0	3–1		3–2	3–0
RMUTL Phitsanulok	0–3	3–0	3–1	3–0	0–3	2–3		3–1
Ratchaburi	0–3	1–3	0–3	3–2	0–3	0–3	1–3	

Legend: Blue = home team win; Yellow = draw; Red = away team win.

=== Positions by round ===
Leader
Qualification to Finals series
Relegation to Pro Challenge

Team ╲ Round	1	2	3	4	5	6	7	8	9	10	11	12	13	14
Air Force	6	5	5	5	4	3	4	5	5	4	3	3	2	3
Visakha	1	1	1	2	2	5	5	4	2	5	5	4	4	4
Ratchaburi	7	7	8	8	8	8	8	8	7	7	7	7	7	7
Khonkaen	8	6	7	7	7	7	7	7	8	8	8	8	8	8
Nakhon Ratchasima The Mall	2	3	3	3	3	2	2	2	3	2	2	2	3	2
NK Fitness Samutsakhon	5	8	6	4	6	6	6	6	6	6	6	6	6	6
RMUTL Phitsanulok	4	4	4	6	5	4	3	3	4	3	4	5	5	5
Diamond Food Saraburi	3	2	2	1	1	1	1	1	1	1	1	1	1	1

=== Results ===
==== First leg ====
All times are Indochina Time (UTC+07:00).

===== Week 1 – Chonburi =====
Date	Time		Score		Set 1	Set 2	Set 3	Set 4	Set 5	Total	Report
27 Oct	09:00	Visakha	3–0	Khonkaen	25–10	25–22	25–19			75–51	Bulletin W1
27 Oct	18:00	Air Force	1–3	Diamond Food Saraburi	16–25	25–23	20–25	15-25		76–73	Bulletin W1
28 Oct	09:00	Ratchaburi	0–3	Nakhon Ratchasima The Mall	21–25	18–25	36–38			75–88	Bulletin W1
28 Oct	15:00	RMUTL Phitsanulok	3–1	NK Fitness Samutsakorn	25–20	25–19	16–25	25-21		91–64	Bulletin W1

===== Week 2 – Nakhon Ratchasima =====
Date	Time		Score		Set 1	Set 2	Set 3	Set 4	Set 5	Total	Report
3 Nov	09:00	Ratchaburi	2–3	Khonkaen	23–25	25–17	22–25	25-12	16-18	111–67	Bulletin W2
3 Nov	15:00	Nakhon Ratchasima The Mall	1–3	Diamond Food Saraburi	22–25	15–25	25–16	21–25		83–91	Bulletin W2
4 Nov	09:00	RMUTL Phitsanulok	1–3	Air Force	20–25	25–18	21–25	21–25		87–93	Bulletin W2
4 Nov	15:00	Visakha	3–0	NK Fitness Samutsakorn	25–22	25–20	25–19			75–61	Bulletin W2

===== Week 3 – Bangkok =====
Date	Time		Score		Set 1	Set 2	Set 3	Set 4	Set 5	Total	Report
10 Nov	09:00	Diamond Food Saraburi	3–1	RMUTL Phitsanulok	25–22	24–26	25–18	25–17		99–83	Bulletin W3
10 Nov	15:00	Nakhon Ratchasima The Mall	3–0	Khonkaen	25–9	25–14	25–21			75–44	Bulletin W3
11 Nov	09:00	Ratchaburi	0–3	NK Fitness Samutsakorn	19–25	20–25	22–25			61–75	Bulletin W3
11 Nov	15:00	Visakha	3–1	Air Force	25–21	33–31	21–25	26–24		105–101	Bulletin W3

===== Week 4 – Bangkok =====
Date	Time		Score		Set 1	Set 2	Set 3	Set 4	Set 5	Total	Report
17 Nov	15:00	Ratchaburi	0–3	Air Force	15–25	18–25	19–25			52–75	Bulletin W4
17 Nov	18:00	Nakhon Ratchasima The Mall	0–3	RMUTL Phitsanulok	22–25	22–25	13–25			57–75	Bulletin W4
18 Nov	12:00	Khonkaen	0–3	NK Fitness Samutsakorn	18–25	21–25	16–25			55–75	Bulletin W4
18 Nov	15:00	Diamond Food Saraburi	3–0	Visakha	25–19	25–20	25–17			75–56	Bulletin W4

===== Week 5 – Bangkok =====
Date	Time		Score		Set 1	Set 2	Set 3	Set 4	Set 5	Total	Report
1 Dec	09:00	Khonkaen	0–3	Air Force	22–25	5–25	14–25			41–75	Bulletin W5
1 Dec	15:00	Visaka	2–3	RMUTL Phitsanulok	25–22	17–25	21–25	25–16	10–15	98–103	Bulletin W5
2 Dec	09:00	Ratchaburi	0–3	Diamond Food Saraburi	17–25	16–25	19–25			52–75	Bulletin W5
2 Dec	15:00	NK Fitness Samutsakorn	0–3	Nakhon Ratchasima The Mall	14–25	16–25	15–25			45–75	Bulletin W5

===== Week 6 – Khon Kaen =====
Date	Time		Score		Set 1	Set 2	Set 3	Set 4	Set 5	Total	Report
15 Dec	09:00	Nakhon Ratchasima The Mall	3–0	Visakha	25–21	25–22	25–22			75–65	Bulletin W6
15 Dec	15:00	Air Force	3–0	NK Fitness Samutsakorn	25–21	25–18	25–14			75–53	Bulletin W6
16 Dec	09:00	RMUTL Phitsanulok	3–1	Ratchaburi	25–23	25–17	20–25	25–16		95–81	Bulletin W6
16 Dec	15:00	Diamond Food Saraburi	3–0	Khonkaen	25–22	25–15	25–14			75–51	Bulletin W6

===== Week 7 – Khon Kaen =====
Date	Time		Score		Set 1	Set 2	Set 3	Set 4	Set 5	Total	Report
22 Dec	09:00	Visakha	3–0	Ratchaburi	25–18	25–13	25–16			75–47	Bulletin W7
22 Dec	15:00	Nakhon Ratchasima The Mall	3–2	Air Force	18–25	20–25	25–20	25–22	15–11	103–103	Bulletin W7
23 Dec	09:00	RMUTL Phitsanulok	3–0	Khonkaen	25–21	25–21	25–20			75–62	Bulletin W7
23 Dec	15:00	NK Fitness Samutsakorn	2–3	Diamond Food Saraburi	21–25	25–20	25–18	23–25	16–18	110–106	Bulletin W7

==== Second leg ====
All times are Indochina Time (UTC+07:00).

===== Week 8 – Khon Kaen =====
Date	Time		Score		Set 1	Set 2	Set 3	Set 4	Set 5	Total	Report
5 Jan	09:00	Ratchaburi	0–3	Nakhon Ratchasima The Mall	18–25	10–25	19–25			47–75	Bulletin W8
5 Jan	15:00	Air Force	2–3	Diamond Food Saraburi	23–25	16–25	25–18	26–24	10–15	100–107	Bulletin W8
5 Jan	09:00	Visakha	3–0	Khonkaen	25–12	25–19	25–21			75–52	Bulletin W8
5 Jan	15:00	RMUTL Phitsanulok	3–0	NK Fitness Samutsakorn	25–16	25–21	25–21			75–58	Bulletin W8

===== Week 9 – Nonthaburi =====
Date	Time		Score		Set 1	Set 2	Set 3	Set 4	Set 5	Total	Report
26 Jan	12:00	Ratchaburi	3–2	Khonkaen	25–21	25–27	23–25	25–16	16–14	114–103	Bulletin W9
26 Jan	18:00	Nakhon Ratchasima The Mall	0–3	Diamond Food Saraburi	21–25	20–25	16–25			57–75	Bulletin W9
27 Jan	12:00	Visakha	3–1	NK Fitness Samutsakorn	19–25	25–11	25–22	25–17		94–75	Bulletin W9
27 Jan	18:00	RMUTL Phitsanulok	0–3	Air Force	16–25	19–25	12–25			47–75	Bulletin W9

===== Week 10 – Nonthaburi =====
Date	Time		Score		Set 1	Set 2	Set 3	Set 4	Set 5	Total	Report
02 Feb	09:00	Nakhon Ratchasima The Mall	3–0	Khonkaen	25–15	25–17	25–19			75–51	Bulletin W10
02 Feb	15:00	Diamond Food Saraburi	1–3	RMUTL Phitsanulok	25–16	18–25	21–25	21–25		85–91	Bulletin W10
03 Feb	09:00	Ratchaburi	1–3	NK Fitness Samutsakorn	16–25	23–25	25–18	23–25		87–93	Bulletin W10
03 Feb	15:00	Visakha	1–3	Air Force	25–19	14–25	23–25	23–25		85–94	Bulletin W10

===== Week 11 – Nakhon Ratchasima =====
}

Date	Time		Score		Set 1	Set 2	Set 3	Set 4	Set 5	Total	Report
09 Feb	09:00	Khonkaen	0–3	NK Fitness Samutsakorn	22–25	13–25	11–25			46–75	Bulletin W11
09 Feb	15:00	Nakhon Ratchasima The Mall	3–0	RMUTL Phitsanulok	25–16	25–15	25–23			75–54	Bulletin W11
10 Feb	09:00	Ratchaburi	0–3	Air Force	18–25	15–25	18–25			51–75	Bulletin W11
10 Feb	18:00	Diamond Food Saraburi	3–2	Visakha	25–22	19–25	25–20	21–25	15–13	105–105	Bulletin W11

===== Week 12 – Nakhon Ratchasima =====
Date	Time		Score		Set 1	Set 2	Set 3	Set 4	Set 5	Total	Report
16 Feb	09:00	Khonkaen	0–3	Air Force	17–25	19–25	17–25			53–75	Bulletin W12
16 Feb	15:00	NK Fitness Samutsakorn	0–3	Nakhon Ratchasima The Mall	20–25	29–31	17–25			66–81	Bulletin W12
17 Feb	12:00	Ratchaburi	0–3	Diamond Food Saraburi	19–25	15–25	16–25			50–75	Bulletin W12
17 Feb	18:00	RMUTL Phitsanulok	2–3	Visakha	22–25	13–25	26–24	25–17	12–15	98–106	Bulletin W12

===== Week 13 – Bangkok =====
Date	Time		Score		Set 1	Set 2	Set 3	Set 4	Set 5	Total	Report
23 Feb	12:00	Air Force	3–0	NK Fitness Samutsakorn	25–23	25–11	25–14			75–48	Bulletin W13
23 Feb	15:00	Nakhon Ratchasima The Mall	1–3	Visakha	23–25	21–25	25–11	22–25		91–86	Bulletin W13
24 Feb	09:00	Diamond Food Saraburi	3–0	Khonkaen	25–16	25–21	25–12			75–49	Bulletin W13
24 Feb	12:00	RMUTL Phitsanulok	3–1	Ratchaburi	22–25	25–15	25–18	25–18		97–76	Bulletin W13

===== Week 14 – Bangkok =====
Date	Time		Score		Set 1	Set 2	Set 3	Set 4	Set 5	Total	Report
2 Mar	12:00	Ratchaburi	0–3	Visakha	18–25	20–25	22–25			60–75	Bulletin W14
2 Mar	15:00	Nakhon Ratchasima The Mall	3–0	Air Force	25–23	25–15	25–22			75–60	Bulletin W14
3 Mar	12:00	RMUTL Phitsanulok	3–0	Khonkaen	26–24	25–21	27–25			78–70	Bulletin W14
3 Mar	12:00	Diamond Food Saraburi	3–1	NK Fitness Samutsakorn	29–27	23–25	25–16	25–15		102–83	Bulletin W14

== Finals series ==
All times are Indochina Time (UTC+07:00).

=== Final Team ===
Pos	Club
1	Diamond Food Saraburi
2	Air Force
3	Visakha
4	Nakhon Ratchasima The Mall

=== Venue ===
The final series matches are played at the MCC Hall The Mall Bang Kapi in Bangkok.

Bang Kapi	Bangkok Metropolis
MCC Hall The Mall Bang Kapi	Bangkok Metropolis
Capacity: 10,000	Bangkok Metropolis
	2018–19 Men's Volleyball Thailand League (Bangkok)

=== Semi-finals ===
Date	Time		Score		Set 1	Set 2	Set 3	Set 4	Set 5	Total	Report
16 Mar	09:00	Diamond Food Saraburi	3–1	Visakha	25–12	25–16	20–25	25–18		95–71	Report
16 Mar	12:00	Nakhon Ratchasima The Mall	1–3	Air Force	30–32	15–25	25–19	13–25		83–101	Report

=== 3rd place ===
Date	Time		Score		Set 1	Set 2	Set 3	Set 4	Set 5	Total	Report
17 Mar	09:00	Visakha	3–1	Nakhon Ratchasima The Mall	25–21	25–20	21–25	25–15		96–81	Report

=== Final ===
Date	Time		Score		Set 1	Set 2	Set 3	Set 4	Set 5	Total	Report
17 Mar	18:00	Diamond Food Saraburi	1–3	Air Force	22–25	25–17	16–25	18–25		81–92	Report

== Final standing ==
Rank	Team
1st place, gold medalist(s)	Air Force
2nd place, silver medalist(s)	Diamond Food Saraburi
3rd place, bronze medalist(s)	Visakha
4	Nakhon Ratchasima The Mall
5	RMUTL Phitsanulok
6	NK Fitness Samutsakorn
7	Ratchaburi
8	Khonkaen

Qualified for the Asian Championship and Super League
Qualified for the Super League
Relegated to Pro Challenge

== Awards ==
- Most valuable player

(Thailand) Kantapat Koonmee (Air Force)

- Best scorer

(Thailand) Amorntep Konhan (RMUTL Phitsanulok)

- Best outside spiker

(Thailand) Kantapat Koonmee (Air Force)
(Brazil) Douglas Bueno (Nakhon Ratchasima The Mall)

- Best servers

(Chinese Taipei) Liu Hong-Min (Diamond Food Saraburi)

- Best middle blocker

(Chinese Taipei) Liu Hong-Jie (Diamond Food Saraburi)
(Thailand) Anuchit Pakdeekaew (Air Force)

- Best setter

(Thailand) Saranchit Charoensuk (Nakhon Ratchasima The Mall)

- Best opposite spiker

(Thailand) Amorntep Konhan (Nakhon Ratchasima)

- Best libero

(Thailand) Jakkapong Tongklang (Visakha)

== Statistics leader ==
The statistics of each group follows the vis reports P2 and P5. The statistics include 6 volleyball skills; serve, reception, set, spike, block, and dig. The table below shows the top 5 ranked players in each skill plus top scorers at the completion of the tournament.

=== Regular season ===
After Leg 2 Week 1

==== Best Scorers ====
Best Scorers
	Player	Team	Scores
1	(Thailand) Amorntep Konhan	RMUTL Phitsanulok	164
2	(Thailand) Kittithad Nuwaddee	RMUTL Phitsanulok	150
3	(Thailand) Jirayu Raksakaew	Diamond Food Saraburi	124
4	(Thailand) Kantapat Koonmee	Air Force	121
5	(Chinese Taipei) Liu Hong-Min	Diamond Food Saraburi	115

==== Best Spikers ====
Best Spikers
	Player	Team	%
1	(Brazil) Rodrigo Severino Da Silva	Visakha	51.83
2	(Thailand) Amorntep Konhan	RMUTL Phitsanulok	48.52
3	(Thailand) Kittithad Nuwaddee	RMUTL Phitsanulok	47.43
4	(Thailand) Wanchai Tabwises	Nakhon Ratchasima The Mall	46.03
5	(Brazil) Douglas Bueno	Nakhon Ratchasima The Mall	45.81

==== Best Blockers ====
Best Blockers
	Player	Team	Avg
1	(Chinese Taipei) Liu Hong-Jie	Diamond Food Saraburi	1.19
2	(Thailand) Phasert Pinkaew	RMUTL Phitsanulok	0.75
3	(Thailand) Shotivat Tivsuwan	NK Fitness Samutsakorn	0.59
4	(Thailand) Kittinon Namkhuntod	Nakhon Ratchasima The Mall	0.59
5	(Thailand) Kissada Nilsawai	Air Force	0.55

==== Best Servers ====
Best Servers
	Player	Team	Avg
1	(Thailand) Wuttiporn Yookong	Visakha	0.37
2	(Thailand) Amorntep Konhan	RMUTL Phitsanulok	0.33
3	(Thailand) Chakkrit Chandahuadong	Nakhon Ratchasima The Mall	0.33
4	(Chinese Taipei) Liu Hong-Jie	Diamond Food Saraburi	0.32
3	(Thailand) Saranchit Charoensuk	Nakhon Ratchasima The Mall	0.30

==== Best Diggers ====
Best Diggers
	Player	Team	Avg
1	(Thailand) Jakkapong Tongklang	Visakha	1.28
2	(Thailand) Phongphat Sangurai	Ratchaburi	1.33
3	(Thailand) Santi Somsuk	NK Fitness Samutsakorn	1.26
4	(Thailand) Siwadon Sanhatham	RMUTL Phitsanulok	1.07
5	(Thailand) Niwat Orsari	Khonkaen	1.00

==== Best Setters ====
Best Setters
	Player	Team	Avg
1	(Thailand) Narongrit Janpirom	RMUTL Phitsanulok	7.77
2	(Thailand) Saranchit Charoensuk	Nakhon Ratchasima The Mall	7.37
3	(Thailand) Thanapat Yooyen	Diamond Food Saraburi	6.52
4	(Thailand) Mawin Maneewong	Air Force	5.90
4	(Thailand) Chanathip Jampasan	NK Fitness Samutsakorn	5.81

==== Best Receivers ====
Best Receivers
	Player	Team	%
1	(Thailand) Montri Phuanglib	Diamond Food Saraburi	40.14
2	(Thailand) Santi Somsuk	NK Fitness Samutsakorn	33.13
3	(Thailand) Jakkapong Tongklang	Visakha	33.09
1	(Thailand) Thanapat Jaroensuk	Nakhon Ratchasima The Mall	31.67
5	(Chinese Taipei) Liu Hong-Min	Diamond Food Saraburi	25.13

== See also ==
- 2018–19 Women's Volleyball Thailand League
- 2018 Men's Volleyball Kor Royal Cup
- 2018 Men's Volleyball Pro Challenge
- 2018 Women's Volleyball Kor Royal Cup
- 2018 Women's Volleyball Pro Challenge
