= Kantapat Koonmee =

Thai volleyball player (born 1998)

Personal information
- Full name: Kantapat Koonmee
- Nickname: Turk
- Nationality: Thai
- Born: April 17, 1998 (age 28); Bangkok, Thailand
- Height: 2.04 m (6 ft 8 in)
- Weight: 86 kg (190 lb)
- Spike: 355 cm (140 in)
- Block: 345 cm (136 in)
- Education: Phranakhon Rajabhat University

Volleyball information
- Position: Outside hitter
- Number: 16

National team
2016–2019, 2022–2023	Thailand
Honours
Men's volleyball
Representing Thailand
Southeast Asian Games
Gold medal – first place	2017 Kuala Lumpur	Team
Bronze medal – third place	2019 Pasig	Team

Kantapat Koonmee (Thai: กันตพัฒน์ คูณมี, born 17 April 1998) is a member of the Thailand men's national volleyball team.

== Clubs ==
- (Thailand) Chonburi (2014–2016)
- (Thailand) Air force (2016–2020)
- (Thailand) Diamond Food (2020–2022)
- (Japan) Oita Miyoshi Weisse Adler (2022–2023)
- (Thailand) Diamond Food (2024–2025)

== Awards ==
=== Individual ===
- MVP, 2016 SEA Men's U20 Championships
- 2017 Thai-Denmark Super League "Best scorer"
- 2017–18 Thailand League "Best outside spiker"
- 2018 Thai-Denmark Super League "Best spiker"
- 2018–19 Thailand League "Most valuable player"
- 2018–19 Thailand League "Best outside spiker"
- 2020–21 Thailand League "Best opposite spiker"

=== Clubs ===
- 2015–16 Thailand League - Bronze Medal, with Chonburi E-Tech Air Force
- 2016–17 Thailand League - Champion, with Air Force
- 2017 Thai–Denmark Super League - Runner-up, with Air Force
- 2017–18 Thailand League - Champion, with Air Force
- 2018 Thai–Denmark Super League - Champion, with Air Force
- 2017–18 Thailand League - Champion, with Air Force
- 2019 Thai–Denmark Super League - Runner-Up, with Air Force
- 2021–22 Thailand League - Champion, with Diamond Food
- 2024–25 Thailand League - Runner-Up, with Diamond Food
