= Noppawit Hengkrathok =

Thai volleyball player (born 2001)

Personal information
- Nickname: Atom
- Born: 28 August 2001 (age 25)
- Height: 1.70 m (5 ft 7 in)
- Weight: 63 kg (139 lb)
- Spike: 290 cm (110 in)
- Block: 275 cm (108 in)

Volleyball information
- Position: Libero
- Current club: (Thailand) Nakhon Ratchasima
- Number: 1 (National Team), 25 (Club)

National team
2022–	Thailand

Noppawit Hengkrathok (Thai: นพวิทย์ เหงกระโทก; born 28 August 2001) is a member of the Thailand men's national volleyball team.

== Clubs ==
- (Thailand) Nakhon Ratchasima (2021–)
