= Somporn Wannaprapa =

Thai volleyball player (born 1988)

Personal information
- Full name: Sip Ek Somporn Wannaprapa
- Nickname: Bo
- Born: May 7, 1988 (age 38); Ubon Ratchathani, Thailand
- Height: 1.90 m (6 ft 3 in)
- Weight: 74 kg (163 lb)
- Spike: 314 cm (124 in)
- Block: 305 cm (120 in)

Volleyball information
- Position: Opposite
- Number: 19

National team
2009–2010	Thailand
Honours
Men's volleyball
Representing Thailand
Southeast Asian Games
Silver medal – second place	2009 Vientiane	Team

Somporn Wannaprapa (Thai: สมพร วรรณประภา, born May 7, 1988) is a member of the Thailand men's national volleyball team. He won the silver medal at the 2009 Southeast Asian Games. He participated at the 2010 Asian Games. On club level he played for Federbrau in 2010.

== Personal life ==
Somporn Wannaprapa married Amporn Hyapha in 2014.

== Club ==
- (Thailand) Federbrau (2010)
- (Thailand) Nakhon Sawan (2011–2012)
- (Thailand) Nakhon Ratchasima (2012–2013)
- (Thailand) Nakhonnon 3BB Suandusit (2013–2015)
- (Thailand) Nakhon Ratchasima (2015–2018)

== Awards ==
=== Individual ===
- 2014–15 Thailand League "Best Opposite Hitter"

=== Club ===
- 2016–17 Thailand League - Runner-up, with Nakhon Ratchasima
- 2017 Thai-Denmark Super League - Champion, with Nakhon Ratchasima
- 2017–18 Thailand League - Champion, with Nakhon Ratchasima
- 2018 Thai-Denmark Super League - Bronze Medal, with Nakhon Ratchasima
