= 2017–18 Men's Volleyball Thailand League =

2017–18 Men's Thailand League
- League: Thailand League
- Duration: September 4, 2016 – March, 2017
- Games: 56 (Regular Season)
- Teams: 8

2017–2018
- Season champions: Nakhon Ratchasima The Mall (5th title)
- Season MVP: (Myanmar) Aung Thu
- Finals champions: Nakhon Ratchasima The Mall
- Runners-up: Air Force

Men's Thailand League seasons
- ← 2016–17 2018–19 →

The 2017–18 Men's Volleyball Thailand League was the 12th season of the Thai League, the top Thai professional league for association volleyball clubs, since its establishment in 2005. A total of 8 teams competed in the league. The season started on 4 September 2017.

== Teams ==
Locations of the Thailand League 2017–18 teams

=== Members ===
Men's Thailand League members
Club	Province	2016–17 season
Air Force	Pathum Thani	TL Winners
Cosmo Chiang Rai	Chiang Rai	PL Runners-up
Kasetsart	Bangkok	TL Sixth place
Khonkaen	Khon Kaen	PL Winners
Nakhon Ratchasima The Mall	Nakhon Ratchasima	TL Runners-up
Diamond Food Phitsanulok	Phitsanulok	TL Fifth place
Samanun Ratchaburi	Ratchaburi	TL Third place
Visakha	Bangkok	TL Fourth place

=== Stadiums ===
Men's Thailand League stadiums
Club	Stadium	Capacity
Air Force	BG Sport Hall (Bangkok Glass' home)	4,000
Cosmo Chiang Rai	King Rama IX Stadium (Nakornnont's home)	8,200
Kasetsart	RU Gymnasium (Bangkok's home)	—N/a
Khonkaen	Khon Kaen Provincial Gymnasium	4,000
Nakhon Ratchasima The Mall	The Mall Nakhon Ratchasima	5,100
Diamond Food Phitsanulok	PSRU Indoor Stadium	8,200
Samanun Ratchaburi	Chonburi Municipal Stadium (Supreme's home)	8,700
Samanun Ratchaburi	Assumption College Sriracha (Supreme's home)	—N/a
Samanun Ratchaburi	RSU Gymnasium (RSU's home)	4,300
Visakha	RU Gymnasium	4,000

=== Personnel and sponsoring ===
Men's Thailand League personnel and sponsoring
Team	Head coach	Team captain	Colors	Kit manufacturer	Main Sponsor
Air Force	(Thailand) Padejsuk Wannachote	(Thailand) Pattharapong Sripon		Kela	Singha
Cosmo Chiang Rai	(Thailand) Suthee Sitthi	(Thailand) Yossapon Wattana		Grand Sport	Cosmo oil
Kasetsart University	(Thailand) Yutthachat Ratthanawongphak	(Thailand) Wantanachai Pankunrak		Grand Sport	Kasetsart University
Khonkaen	(Thailand) Suyothin Sangdang	(Thailand) Anuchai Sitthitong		Grand Sport	Cho-Thavee
Nakhon Ratchasima The Mall	(Thailand) Somboon Sukonthapong	(Thailand) Wanchai Tabwises		Mizuno	The Mall
Visakha	(Thailand) Suthee Sitthi	(Thailand) Kittikun Sriutthawong		Kela	NK Fitness
RMUTL Phitsanulok	(Thailand) Takool Nakornthan	(Thailand) Teerasak Nakprasong		Grand Sport	Diamond Food
Samanun Ratchaburi	(Thailand) Theerasak Sukaboon	(Thailand) Montri Vaenpradab		Mizuno	Samanan

=== Foreign players ===
Men's Thailand League national foreign players
Team	Player 1	Player 2
Air Force	(Kyrgyzstan) Kanybek Uulu Onelbek (AVC)	(Sri Lanka) Janita Surat (AVC)
Nakhon Ratchasima The Mall	(Myanmar) Aung Thu (AVC)	—N/a
Diamond Food RMUTL Phitsanulok	(Brazil) Luiz Pereto (CSV)	(Brazil) Pablo Femando (CSV)
Visakha Volleyball Club	(Cambodia) Raksmey My (AVC)	—N/a
Khonkaen VC	(Cambodia) Samaeth Nouv (AVC)	(Cambodia) Channaro Soun (AVC)
Samanan Ratchaburi	(Myanmar) Zaw Htet Aung (AVC)	(Myanmar) Thwin Htoo Zin (AVC)

== Tournament format ==
- First round: single round-robin.
- Second round: single round-robin.

=== Season standing procedure ===
1. Number of matches won
2. Match points
3. Sets ratio
4. Points ratio
5. Result of the last match between the tied teams

Match won 3–0 or 3–1: 3 match points for the winner, 0 match points for the loser
Match won 3–2: 2 match points for the winner, 1 match point for the loser

== League table ==
=== Standings ===
Pos	Team	Pld	W	L	Pts	SW	SL	SR	SPW	SPL	SPR	Qualification or relegation
1	Nakhon Ratchasima The Mall	14	13	1	38	40	6	6.667	1123	843	1.332	Asian Championship and Super League
2	Air Force	14	12	2	37	39	9	4.333	1135	899	1.263	Super League
3	Diamond Food Phitsanulok	14	11	3	33	36	11	3.273	1132	947	1.195	Super League
4	Visakha	14	7	7	21	22	23	0.957	1015	1015	1.000	Super League
5	Samanun Ratchaburi	14	4	10	13	17	31	0.548	1023	1093	0.936	Super League
6	Cosmo Chiang Rai	14	6	8	16	18	30	0.600	1007	1084	0.929	Super League
7	Khonkaen	14	2	12	6	10	39	0.256	915	1165	0.785	Relegated to Division 2
8	Kasetsart	14	1	13	3	7	41	0.171	851	1155	0.737	Relegated to Division 2

=== Results ===
Home \ Away	AIF	CRI	KSS	KKN	NMA	VSK	RLK	RBR
Air Force		2–0	2–0	2–0	1–1	2–0	1–1	2–0
Cosmo Chiang Rai	0–2		2–0	2–0	0–2	0–2	0–2	1–1
Kasetsart	0–2	0–2		1–1	0–2	0–2	0–2	0–2
Khonkaen	0–2	0–2	1–1		0–2	0–2	0–2	0–2
Nakhon Ratchasima The Mall	1–1	2–0	2–0	2–0		2–0	2–0	2–0
Visakha	0–2	2–0	2–0	2–0	0–2		0–2	2–0
Diamond Food Phitsanulok	1–1	2–0	2–0	2–0	0–2	2–0		2–0
Samanun Ratchaburi	0–2	2–0	2–0	1–1	0–2	0–2	0–2	

Updated to match(es) played on 22 October 2017. Source:
Legend: Blue = home team win; Yellow = draw; Red = away team win.

=== Positions by round ===
Leader
Relegation to Pro Challenge

Team ╲ Round	1	2	3	4	5	6	7	8	9	10	11	12	13	14
Air Force	1	2	2	2	2	1	1	3	3	3	2	2	2	2
Cosmo Chiang Rai	5	4	5	4	6	6	6	6	6	6	6	6	5	5
Kasetsart	8	8	8	8	8	8	8	8	8	8	8	8	8	8
Khonkaen	7	7	7	7	7	7	7	7	7	7	7	7	7	7
Nakhon Ratchasima The Mall	2	3	3	3	3	3	3	2	2	2	1	1	1	1
NK Fitness Samutsakhon	4	5	4	5	4	4	4	4	4	4	4	4	4	4
Diamond Food Phitsanulok	3	1	1	1	1	2	2	1	1	1	3	2	3	3
Samanun Ratchaburi	6	6	6	6	5	5	5	5	5	5	5	6	6	6

== First leg ==
Date	Time		Score		Set 1	Set 2	Set 3	Set 4	Set 5	Total	Report
4 Nov	18:00	Khonkaen	0–3	Nakhon Ratchasima The Mall	24–26	14–25	19–25			57–76	
11 Nov	18:00	Air Force	3–0	Kasetsart University	25–10	25–13	25–17			75–40	
11 Nov	18:00	NK Fitness Samutsakhon	3–0	Cosmo Chiang Rai	25–21	25–22	25–21			75–64	
12 Nov	18:00	Diamond Food RMUTL Phitsanulok	3–0	Samanun Ratchaburi	26–24	25–18	25–23			76–65	

Date	Time		Score		Set 1	Set 2	Set 3	Set 4	Set 5	Total	Report
18 Nov	18:00	Nakhon Ratchasima The Mall	1–3	Air Force	25–16	20–25	21–25	21–25		87–91	
18 Nov	18:00	Kasetsart University	0–3	Cosmo Chiang Rai	17–25	20–25	21–25			58–75	
19 Nov	15:00	Samanun Ratchaburi	3–1	Khonkaen	25–19	23–25	25–16	25–16		98–76	
19 Nov	18:00	Diamond Food RMUTL Phitsanulok	3–0	NK Fitness Samutsakhon	25–17	25–21	26–24			76–62	

Date	Time		Score		Set 1	Set 2	Set 3	Set 4	Set 5	Total	Report
25 Nov	18:00	Kasetsart University	1–3	NK Fitness Samutsakhon	19–25	27–25	16–25	25–27		87–102	
25 Nov	18:00	Nakhon Ratchasima The Mall	3–0	Samanun Ratchaburi	25–19	25–17	25–15			75–51	
26 Nov	15:00	Air Force	3–0	Khonkaen	25–22	25–20	25–18			75–60	
26 Nov	18:00	Diamond Food RMUTL Phitsanulok	3–0	Cosmo Chiang Rai	25–21	25–19	25–20			75–60	

Date	Time		Score		Set 1	Set 2	Set 3	Set 4	Set 5	Total	Report
2 Dec	18:00	Diamond Food RMUTL Phitsanulok	3–2	Air Force	25–21	25–18	25–27	19–25	15–11	109–102	
2 Dec	18:00	Nakhon Ratchasima The Mall	3–0	NK Fitness Samutsakhon	25–23	25–19	26–24			76–66	
3 Dec	15:00	Khonkaen	1–3	Cosmo Chiang Rai	22–25	25–20	12–25	26–28		85–98	
3 Dec	18:00	Kasetsart University	0–3	Samanun Ratchaburi	21–25	18–25	17–25			56–75	

Date	Time		Score		Set 1	Set 2	Set 3	Set 4	Set 5	Total	Report
9 Dec	18:00	Diamond Food RMUTL Phitsanulok	3–0	Khonkaen	25–16	25–18	25–18			75–52	
10 Dec	18:00	NK Fitness Samutsakhon	3–1	Samanun Ratchaburi	26–24	22–25	25–22	25–15		98–86	
10 Dec	18:00	Nakhon Ratchasima The Mall	3–0	Kasetsart University	25–15	25–17	25–8			75–40	
11 Dec	19:00	Air Force	3–0	Cosmo Chiang Rai	25–17	25–15	25–15			75–47	

Date	Time		Score		Set 1	Set 2	Set 3	Set 4	Set 5	Total	Report
16 Dec	18:00	Khonkaen	3–1	Kasetsart University	23–25	25–19	25–15	25–13		98–72	
16 Dec	18:00	NK Fitness Samutsakhon	0–3	Air Force	19–25	18–25	11–25			48–75	
17 Dec	15:00	Samanun Ratchaburi	3–0	Cosmo Chiang Rai	25–23	25–23	25–22			75–68	
17 Dec	18:00	Nakhon Ratchasima The Mall	3–2	Diamond Food RMUTL Phitsanulok	24–26	25–23	25–23	22–25	15–10	111–107	

Date	Time		Score		Set 1	Set 2	Set 3	Set 4	Set 5	Total	Report
23 Dec	15:00	Air Force	3–1	Samanun Ratchaburi	27–25	21–25	25–13	25–16		98–79	
23 Dec	18:00	Nakhon Ratchasima The Mall	3–0	Cosmo Chiang Rai	25–17	25–18	25–11			75–46	
24 Dec	15:00	Kasetsart University	0–3	Diamond Food RMUTL Phitsanulok	16–25	17–25	17–25			50–75	
24 Dec	18:00	Khonkaen	0–3	NK Fitness Samutsakhon	20–25	22–25	16–25			58–75	

== Second leg ==
Date	Time		Score		Set 1	Set 2	Set 3	Set 4	Set 5	Total	Report
13 Jan	15:00	Kasetsart University	0–3	Air Force	12–25	18–25	11–25			41–75	
13 Jan	15:00	Nakhon Ratchasima The Mall	3–0	Cosmo Chiang Rai	25–16	25–18	25–22			75–56	
14 Jan	15:00	Visakha	3–0	Khonkaen	25–16	25–14	25–13			75–43	
14 Jan	18:00	Diamond Food RMUTL Phitsanulok	3–0	Samanun Ratchaburi	25–23	25–18	25–18			75–59	

Date	Time		Score		Set 1	Set 2	Set 3	Set 4	Set 5	Total	Report
20 Jan	15:00	Air Force	1–3	Nakhon Ratchasima The Mall	21–25	14–25	25–23	25–12		85–85	
20 Jan	15:00	Kasetsart University	2–3	Cosmo Chiang Rai	22–25	25–22	14–25	25–23	8–15	94–110	
21 Jan	15:00	Khonkaen	3–2	Samanun Ratchaburi	25–20	11–25	14–25	25–20	15–13	90–103	
21 Jan	15:00	Visakha	0–3	Diamond Food RMUTL Phitsanulok	23–25	19–25	21–25			63–75	

Date	Time		Score		Set 1	Set 2	Set 3	Set 4	Set 5	Total	Report
3 Feb	18:00	Visakha	3–0	Kasetsart University	25–14	25–20	25–17			75–51	
3 Feb	18:00	Samanun Ratchaburi	0–3	Nakhon Ratchasima The Mall	17–25	19–25	17–25			53–75	
4 Feb	15:00	Diamond Food RMUTL Phitsanulok	3–0	Cosmo Chiang Rai	25–15	25–15	25–19			75–49	
4 Feb	15:00	Air Force	3–0	Khonkaen	25–12	25–16	25–12			75–40	

Date	Time		Score		Set 1	Set 2	Set 3	Set 4	Set 5	Total	Report
10 Feb	15:00	Samanun Ratchaburi	3–0	Kasetsart University	25–12	25–19	25–22			75–53	
10 Feb	15:00	Nakhon Ratchasima The Mall	3–0	Visakha	25–19	25–15	25–18			75–52	
11 Feb	15:00	Air Force	3–1	Diamond Food RMUTL Phitsanulok	25–23	27–25	20–25	25–22		97–95	
11 Feb	15:00	Cosmo Chiang Rai	3–0	Khonkaen	28–26	28–26	25–20			81–72	

Date	Time		Score		Set 1	Set 2	Set 3	Set 4	Set 5	Total	Report
17 Feb	18:00	Cosmo Chiang Rai	0–3	Air Force	19–25	16–25	16–25			51–75	
17 Feb	18:00	Kasetsart University	0–3	Nakhon Ratchasima The Mall	17–25	13–25	12–25			42–75	
18 Feb	15:00	Samanun Ratchaburi	0–3	Visakha	22–25	23–25	20–25			65–75	
18 Feb	15:00	Khonkaen	0–3	Diamond Food RMUTL Phitsanulok	16–25	19–25	15–25			50–75	

Date	Time		Score		Set 1	Set 2	Set 3	Set 4	Set 5	Total	Report
24 Feb	18:00	Visakha	0–3	Air Force	16–25	23–25	16–25			55–75	
24 Feb	18:00	Nakhon Ratchasima The Mall	3–0	Khonkaen	25–18	25–17	25–13			75–48	
25 Feb	18:00	Cosmo Chiang Rai	3–1	Samanun Ratchaburi	25–19	21–25	25–23	25–20		96–87	
25 Feb	18:00	Diamond Food RMUTL Phitsanulok	3–0	Kasetsart University	25–16	25–16	25–21			75–53	

Date	Time		Score		Set 1	Set 2	Set 3	Set 4	Set 5	Total	Report
3 Mar	18:00	Samanun Ratchaburi	0–3	Air Force	17–25	19–25	13–25			49–75	
3 Mar	18:00	Cosmo Chiang Rai	3–2	Visakha	25–16	23–25	21–25	25–15	15–13	109–94	
4 Mar	15:00	Diamond Food RMUTL Phitsanulok	0–3	Nakhon Ratchasima The Mall	21–25	21–25	20–25			62–75	
4 Mar	15:00	Khonkaen	2–3	Kasetsart University	21–25	14–25	25–18	25–21	10–15	95–104	

== Final standing ==
Rank	Team
1st place, gold medalist(s)	Nakhon Ratchasima The Mall
2nd place, silver medalist(s)	Air Force
3rd place, bronze medalist(s)	Diamond Food Phitsanulok
4	Visakha
5	Cosmo Chiang Rai
6	Samanun Ratchaburi
7	Khonkaen
8	Kasetsart

Qualified for the Asian Championship and Super League
Qualified for the Super League
Relegated to Division 2

2017–18 Men's Thailand League
Nakhon Ratchasima The Mall
5th title
Champion and Thailand League representative
Team roster
Krisorn Srita, Jetsadakorn Nusee, Wanchai Tabwises (c), Yuranan Buadang, Aung Thu, Nantawut Taengkrathok, Anucha Pinsuwan, Pitak Ausoongnoen, Kittipong Suksala, Jirawan Thumtong, Tanapat Charoensuk, Wutthikrai Torrobrum, Chakkrit Chandahuadong, Saranchit Charoensuk, Wutthichai Suksala, Somporn Wannaprapa, Ratchanon Chaichalasang, Boonyarid Wongtorn
Head coach
Somboon Sukonpong

== Awards ==
- Most valuable player
  (Myanmar) Aung Thu (Nakhon Ratchasima)
- Best opposite spiker
  (Myanmar) Aung Thu (Nakhon Ratchasima)
  (Brazil) Luiz Perezto (Diamond Food RMUTL)
- Best outside spiker
  (Thailand) Wanchai Tabwises (Nakhon Ratchasima)
- Best middle blocker
  (Thailand) Teerasak Nakprasong (Diamond Food RMUTL)
  (Thailand) Kissada Nilsawai (Air Force)
- Best setter
  (Thailand) Adipong Phonpinyo (Diamond Food RMUTL)
- Best libero
  (Thailand) Tanapat Charoensuk (Nakhon Ratchasima)
- Best coach
  (Thailand) Somboon Sukonthapong (Nakhon Ratchasima)

== See also ==
- 2017–18 Women's Volleyball Thailand League
