= Nakhonratchasima =

Nakhonratchasima may refer to:

- Nakhon Ratchasima, a city in Thailand
- Nakhon Ratchasima Province, a province of Thailand
- Nakhon Ratchasima (men's volleyball), a volleyball men's club in Thailand
- Nakhon Ratchasima (women's volleyball), a volleyball women's club in Thailand
