= Volleyball at the 2009 SEA Games =

Indoor volleyball at the 2009 SEA Games were held in gymnasium 2, National Sport Complex, Vientiane, Laos. Beach volleyball at the games was held in the beach volleyball stadium of the National Sport Complex.

== Medal summary ==
Rank	Nation	Gold	Silver	Bronze	Total
1	Thailand (THA)	2	2	0	4
2	Indonesia (INA)	2	1	1	4
3	Vietnam (VIE)	0	1	1	2
4	Malaysia (MAS)	0	0	1	1
4	Myanmar (MYA)	0	0	1	1
Totals (5 entries)		4	4	4	12

== Medalist ==
=== Indoor volleyball ===
Event	Gold	Silver	Bronze
Men	Indonesia (INA); Adam; Affan Priyo Wicaksono; Agung Seganti; Andri Widiatmoko; Ayip Rizal; Bagus Wahyu Ardyanto; Didi Irwadi; Fadlan Abdul Karim; I Nyoman Rudi Tirtana; Joni Sugiatno; Muhamad Khasoni Mufid; Muhammad Riviansyah	Thailand (THA); Jirayu Raksakaew; Kitsada Somkane; Kittikun Sriutthawong; Montri Vaenpradab; Nattapong Kesapan; Pissanu Harnkhomtun; Piyarat Toontupthai; Saranchit Charoensuk; Shotivat Tivsuwan; Somporn Wannaprapa; Yuranan Buadang; Wanchai Tabwises	Myanmar (MYA); Aung Myat Tun; Kyaw Kyaw Htway; Kyaw Shwe; Kyaw Swar Win; Kyaw Zin Win Htut; Pain Tha; Sie Nyi Lay; Thein Swe; Win Tun Oo; Ye Min Aung; Ye Myint; Ye Yint Tun
Women	Thailand (THA); Amporn Hyapha; Em-Orn Phanusit; Kamonporn Sukmak; Malika Kanthong; Narumon Khanan; Nootsara Tomkom; Onuma Sittirak; Pleumjit Thinkaow; Tapaphaipun Chaisri; Utaiwan Kaensing; Wanna Buakaew; Wilavan Apinyapong	Vietnam (VIE); Bùi Thị Huệ; Đặng Thị Hồng; Đinh Thị Diệu Châu; Đinh Thị Trà Giang; Đỗ Thị Minh; Hà Thị Hoa; Lê Thị Mười; Nguyễn Thị Ngọc Hoa; Nguyễn Thị Xuân; Phạm Thị Kim Huệ; Phạm Thị Yến; Tạ Thị Diệu Linh	Indonesia (INA); Agustin Wulandhari; Amalia Fajrina Nabila; Berllian Marsheilla; Gunarti Indahyani; Josefina Tahalele; Lailatul Aisyah; Maya Kurnia Indri Sari; Maya Puspita Widiastuty; Nety Dyah Puspitarini; Novia Andriyanti; Novriali Yami; Yunita Sari Ayu Iddha

=== Beach volleyball ===
Event	Gold	Silver	Bronze
Men	Indonesia (INA); Andy Ardiyansah; Koko Prasetyo Darkuncoro	Indonesia (INA); Dian Putra Santosa; Suratna	Vietnam (VIE); Nguyễn Trọng Quốc; Phạm Anh Tuấn
Women	Thailand (THA); Yupa Phokongploy; Kamoltip Kulna	Thailand (THA); Usa Tenpaksee; Jarunee Sannok	Malaysia (MAS); Shun Thing; Teck Hua

== Indoor volleyball ==
=== Men ===
==== Preliminary round ====
===== Group A =====
Pos	Team	Pld	W	L	Pts	SPW	SPL	SPR	SW	SL	SR
1	Thailand	2	2	0	4	150	113	1.327	6	0	MAX
2	Myanmar	2	1	1	3	135	125	1.080	3	3	1.000
3	Laos	2	0	2	2	103	150	0.687	0	6	0.000

- Cambodia - Withdraw

Date		Score		Set 1	Set 2	Set 3	Set 4	Set 5	Total
11 Dec	Thailand	3–0	Myanmar	25–16	25–21	25–23			75–60
12 Dec	Laos	0–3	Thailand	19–25	14–25	20–25			53–75
13 Dec	Myanmar	3–0	Laos	25–14	25–17	25–19			75–50

===== Group B =====
Pos	Team	Pld	W	L	Pts	SPW	SPL	SPR	SW	SL	SR
1	Indonesia	2	2	0	4	151	112	1.348	6	0	MAX
2	Vietnam	2	1	1	3	156	163	0.957	3	4	0.750
3	Malaysia	2	0	2	2	144	176	0.818	1	6	0.167

Date		Score		Set 1	Set 2	Set 3	Set 4	Set 5	Total
10 Dec	Malaysia	0–3	Indonesia	11–25	24–26	21–25			56–76
12 Dec	Indonesia	3–0	Vietnam	25–20	25–22	25–15			75–56
14 Dec	Vietnam	3–1	Malaysia	25–21	25–23	25–27	25–17		

==== Knockout stage ====
===== Semifinals =====
December 15, 2009; 16:00 UTC+7	Thailand	3–1	Vietnam	Gymnasium 2 National Sport Complex
December 15, 2009; 16:00 UTC+7	(25–22, 25–19, 15–25, 25–19)			Gymnasium 2 National Sport Complex

December 15, 2009; 18:00 UTC+7	Indonesia	3–0	Myanmar	Gymnasium 2 National Sport Complex
December 15, 2009; 18:00 UTC+7	(25–21, 25–18, 25–22)			Gymnasium 2 National Sport Complex

===== 5th place =====
December 15, 2009; 14:00 UTC+7	Laos	3–2	Malaysia	Gymnasium 2 National Sport Complex
December 15, 2009; 14:00 UTC+7	(22–25, 22–25, 25–19, 25–16, 15–13)			Gymnasium 2 National Sport Complex

===== Bronze-medal match =====
December 17, 2009; 14:00 UTC+7	Vietnam	0–3	Myanmar	Gymnasium 2 National Sport Complex
December 17, 2009; 14:00 UTC+7	(22–25, 21–25, 21–25)			Gymnasium 2 National Sport Complex

===== Gold-medal match =====
December 17, 2009; 16:00 UTC+7	Thailand	2–3	Indonesia	Gymnasium 2 National Sport Complex
December 17, 2009; 16:00 UTC+7	(23–25, 25–21, 16–25, 28–26, 17–19)			Gymnasium 2 National Sport Complex

==== Final standing ====
Rank	Team
1st place, gold medalist(s)	Indonesia
2nd place, silver medalist(s)	Thailand
3rd place, bronze medalist(s)	Myanmar
4	Vietnam
5	Laos
6	Malaysia

2009 Men's Southeast Asian Games champions

Indonesia

=== Women ===
==== Round robin ====
Pos	Team	Pld	W	L	Pts	SPW	SPL	SPR	SW	SL	SR
1	Thailand	3	3	0	6	249	156	1.596	9	1	9.000
2	Vietnam	3	2	1	5	250	192	1.302	7	4	1.750
3	Indonesia	3	1	2	4	185	206	0.898	4	6	0.667
4	Laos	3	0	3	3	95	225	0.422	0	9	0.000

Date		Score		Set 1	Set 2	Set 3	Set 4	Set 5	Total
10 Dec	Indonesia	3–0	Laos	25–6	25–17	25–11			75–34
11 Dec	Indonesia	1–3	Vietnam	7–25	25–22	14–25	21–25		67–97
12 Dec	Laos	0–3	Thailand	10–25	5–25	20–25			35–75
13 Dec	Vietnam	1–3	Thailand	21–25	26–24	10–25	21–25		78–99
14 Dec	Vietnam	3–0	Laos	25–13	25–4	25–9			75–26
14 Dec	Thailand	3–0	Indonesia	25–16	25–10	25–17			75–43

==== Bronze-medal match ====
December 16, 2009; 14:00 UTC+7	Indonesia	3–0	Laos	Gymnasium 2 National Sport Complex
December 16, 2009; 14:00 UTC+7	(25–18, 25–8, 25–10)			Gymnasium 2 National Sport Complex

==== Gold-medal match ====
December 16, 2009; 16:00 UTC+7	Thailand	3–1	Vietnam	Gymnasium 2 National Sport Complex
December 16, 2009; 16:00 UTC+7	(25–27, 25–12, 25–15, 25–20)			Gymnasium 2 National Sport Complex

==== Final standing ====
Rank	Team
1st place, gold medalist(s)	Thailand
2nd place, silver medalist(s)	Vietnam
3rd place, bronze medalist(s)	Indonesia
4	Laos

2009 Women's Southeast Asian Games champions

Thailand

== Beach volleyball ==
=== Men ===
==== Knockout stage ====
===== Overview =====
Quarterfinals; 15 December
(Indonesia) INA 1 Andy / Koko	21	21
(Cambodia) CAM 2 Hang / Sam	16	13
(Philippines) PHI 1 Sasing / Verayo	16	21	13
(Laos) LAO 1 Phonetheva / Nanthaxay	21	13	15
(Thailand) THA 1 Sangkachot / Sukto	21	21	13
(Indonesia) INA 2 Dian / Suratna	23	11	15
(Vietnam) VIE 1 Quoc / Tuan	21	8	15
(Thailand) THA 1 Yungtin / Sawangrueng	19	21	11

Semifinals; 16 December
(Indonesia) INA 1 Andy / Koko	21	21
(Laos) LAO 1 Phonetheva / Nanthaxay	13	16
(Indonesia) INA 2 Dian / Suratna	21	21
(Vietnam) VIE 1 Quoc / Tuan	13	15

Gold-medal game 17 December
(Indonesia) INA 1 Andy / Koko	21	21
(Indonesia) INA 2 Dian / Suratna	17	9
Bronze-medal game 17 December
(Laos) LAO 1 Phonetheva / Nanthaxay	16	21	15
(Vietnam) VIE 1 Quoc / Tuan	21	16	17

=== Women ===
==== Preliminary round ====
===== Group A =====
Pos	Team	Pld	W	L	Pts	SPW	SPL	SPR	SW	SL	SR
1	(Thailand) THA 1 Yupa Phokongploy Kamoltip Kulna	4	4	0	8	168	100	1.680	8	0	MAX
2	(Vietnam) VIE 1 Nguyen Thi Mai Troung Thi Yen	4	2	2	6	161	138	1.167	5	4	1.250
3	(Indonesia) INA 1 Ayu Cahyaningsiam Devota Rahawarin	4	2	2	6	160	163	0.982	4	5	0.800
4	(Laos) LAO 2 Chanaloun Vongsaya Pany Nanhthavong	4	2	2	6	144	146	0.986	4	4	1.000
5	(Malaysia) MAS 2 Jessie Lee Jay See Chia Chou Hwa	4	0	4	4	82	168	0.488	0	8	0.000

December 10, 2009; 09:45 UTC+7; 51 Mins.	(Indonesia) INA 1 Ayu / Devota	2–1	(Vietnam) VIE 1 Mai / Yen	Beach volleyball stadium National Sport Complex
December 10, 2009; 09:45 UTC+7; 51 Mins.	(21–18, 16–21, 15–12)			Beach volleyball stadium National Sport Complex

December 10, 2009; 10:47 UTC+7; 33 Mins.	(Malaysia) MAS 2 Jesse / Chou Hwa	0–2	(Laos) LAO 2 Chanaloun / Pany	Beach volleyball stadium National Sport Complex
December 10, 2009; 10:47 UTC+7; 33 Mins.	(15–21, 9–21)			Beach volleyball stadium National Sport Complex

December 11, 2009; 14:15 UTC+7; 25 Mins.	(Vietnam) VIE 1 Mai / Yen	2–0	(Malaysia) MAS 2 Jesse / Chou Hwa	Beach volleyball stadium National Sport Complex
December 11, 2009; 14:15 UTC+7; 25 Mins.	(21–13, 21–2)			Beach volleyball stadium National Sport Complex

December 11, 2009; 15:05 UTC+7; 34 Mins.	(Thailand) THA 1 Phokongploy / Kulna	2–0	(Indonesia) INA 1 Ayu / Devota	Beach volleyball stadium National Sport Complex
December 11, 2009; 15:05 UTC+7; 34 Mins.	(21–10, 21–18)			Beach volleyball stadium National Sport Complex

December 12, 2009; 09:45 UTC+7; 28 Mins.	(Malaysia) MAS 2 Jesse / Chou Hwa	0–2	(Thailand) THA 1 Phokongploy / Kulna	Beach volleyball stadium National Sport Complex
December 12, 2009; 09:45 UTC+7; 28 Mins.	(10–21, 10–21)			Beach volleyball stadium National Sport Complex

December 12, 2009; 10:30 UTC+7; 31 Mins.	(Laos) LAO 2 Chanaloun / Pany	0–2	(Vietnam) VIE 1 Mai / Yen	Beach volleyball stadium National Sport Complex
December 12, 2009; 10:30 UTC+7; 31 Mins.	(15–21, 14–21)			Beach volleyball stadium National Sport Complex

December 13, 2009; 14:15 UTC+7; 28 Mins.	(Thailand) THA 1 Phokongploy / Kulna	2–0	(Laos) LAO 2 Chanaloun / Pany	Beach volleyball stadium National Sport Complex
December 13, 2009; 14:15 UTC+7; 28 Mins.	(21–10, 21–16)			Beach volleyball stadium National Sport Complex

December 13, 2009; 15:00 UTC+7; 30 Mins.	(Indonesia) INA 1 Ayu / Devota	2–0	(Malaysia) MAS 2 Jesse / Chou Hwa	Beach volleyball stadium National Sport Complex
December 13, 2009; 15:00 UTC+7; 30 Mins.	(21–11, 21–12)			Beach volleyball stadium National Sport Complex

December 14, 2009; 09:45 UTC+7; 35 Mins.	(Vietnam) VIE 1 Mai / Yen	0–2	(Thailand) THA 1 Phokongploy / Kulna	Beach volleyball stadium National Sport Complex
December 14, 2009; 09:45 UTC+7; 35 Mins.	(9–21, 17–21)			Beach volleyball stadium National Sport Complex

December 14, 2009; 10:30 UTC+7; 43 Mins.	(Laos) LAO 2 Chanaloun / Pany	2–0	(Indonesia) INA 1 Ayu / Devota	Beach volleyball stadium National Sport Complex
December 14, 2009; 10:30 UTC+7; 43 Mins.	(26–24, 21–14)			Beach volleyball stadium National Sport Complex

===== Group B =====
Pos	Team	Pld	W	L	Pts	SPW	SPL	SPR	SW	SL	SR
1	(Thailand) THA 2 Usa Tenpaksee Jarunee Sannok	5	5	0	10	210	116	1.810	10	0	MAX
2	(Malaysia) MAS 1 Beh Shun Ting Luk Teck Hua	5	4	1	9	195	161	1.211	8	2	4.000
3	(Indonesia) INA 2 Efa Sri Susilawati Yokbeth Kapasiang	5	3	2	8	201	198	1.015	6	5	1.200
4	(Philippines) PHI 1 Joanna Botor Carpio Michelle Carolino	5	2	3	7	160	193	0.829	4	2	2.000
5	(Laos) LAO 1 Phimphone Boulapha Vongphachanh Xayamonkhon	5	1	4	6	171	218	0.784	2	9	0.222
6	(Vietnam) VIE 2 Do Thi Hau Vo Hong Loan	5	0	5	5	180	235	0.766	2	10	0.200

December 10, 2009; 13:30 UTC+7; 30 Mins.	(Thailand) THA 2 Tenpaksee / Sannok	2–0	(Vietnam) VIE 2 Hau / Loan	Beach volleyball stadium National Sport Complex
December 10, 2009; 13:30 UTC+7; 30 Mins.	(21–16, 21–8)			Beach volleyball stadium National Sport Complex

December 10, 2009; 14:14 UTC+7; 30 Mins.	(Malaysia) MAS 1 Shun Ting / Teck Hua	2–0	(Philippines) PHI 1 Carpio / Carolino	Beach volleyball stadium National Sport Complex
December 10, 2009; 14:14 UTC+7; 30 Mins.	(21–6, 21–19)			Beach volleyball stadium National Sport Complex

December 10, 2009; 15:00 UTC+7; 37 Mins.	(Laos) LAO 1 Phimphone / Vongphachanh	0–2	(Indonesia) INA 2 Efa / Yokbeth	Beach volleyball stadium National Sport Complex
December 10, 2009; 15:00 UTC+7; 37 Mins.	(18–21, 14–21)			Beach volleyball stadium National Sport Complex

December 11, 2009; 09:45 UTC+7; 45 Mins.	(Vietnam) VIE 2 Hau / Loan	1–2	(Indonesia) INA 2 Efa / Yokbeth	Beach volleyball stadium National Sport Complex
December 11, 2009; 09:45 UTC+7; 45 Mins.	(18–21, 21–18, 11–15)			Beach volleyball stadium National Sport Complex

December 11, 2009; 10:30 UTC+7; 55 Mins.	(Philippines) PHI 1 Carpio / Carolino	2–0	(Laos) LAO 1 Phimphone / Vongphachanh	Beach volleyball stadium National Sport Complex
December 11, 2009; 10:30 UTC+7; 55 Mins.	(21–18, 23–21)			Beach volleyball stadium National Sport Complex

December 11, 2009; 13:30 UTC+7; 40 Mins.	(Thailand) THA 2 Tenpaksee / Sannok	2–0	(Malaysia) MAS 1 Shun Ting / Teck Hua	Beach volleyball stadium National Sport Complex
December 11, 2009; 13:30 UTC+7; 40 Mins.	(21–8, 21–14)			Beach volleyball stadium National Sport Complex

December 12, 2009; 13:30 UTC+7; 35 Mins.	(Vietnam) VIE 2 Hau / Loan	0–2	(Malaysia) MAS 1 Shun Ting / Teck Hua	Beach volleyball stadium National Sport Complex
December 12, 2009; 13:30 UTC+7; 35 Mins.	(14–21, 14–21)			Beach volleyball stadium National Sport Complex

December 12, 2009; 14:15 UTC+7; 30 Mins.	(Laos) LAO 1 Phimphone / Vongphachanh	0–2	(Thailand) THA 2 Tenpaksee / Sannok	Beach volleyball stadium National Sport Complex
December 12, 2009; 14:15 UTC+7; 30 Mins.	(7–21, 17–21)			Beach volleyball stadium National Sport Complex

December 12, 2009; 15:00 UTC+7; 35 Mins.	(Indonesia) INA 2 Efa / Yokbeth	2–0	(Philippines) PHI 1 Carpio / Carolino	Beach volleyball stadium National Sport Complex
December 12, 2009; 15:00 UTC+7; 35 Mins.	(21–16, 21–17)			Beach volleyball stadium National Sport Complex

December 13, 2009; 09:45 UTC+7; 30 Mins.	(Thailand) THA 2 Tenpaksee / Sannok	2–0	(Indonesia) INA 2 Efa / Yokbeth	Beach volleyball stadium National Sport Complex
December 13, 2009; 09:45 UTC+7; 30 Mins.	(21–16, 21–10)			Beach volleyball stadium National Sport Complex

December 13, 2009; 10:30 UTC+7; 30 Mins.	(Malaysia) MAS 1 Shun Ting / Teck Hua	2–0	(Laos) LAO 1 Phimphone / Vongphachanh	Beach volleyball stadium National Sport Complex
December 13, 2009; 10:30 UTC+7; 30 Mins.	(21–12, 21–9)			Beach volleyball stadium National Sport Complex

December 13, 2009; 13:30 UTC+7; 42 Mins.	(Philippines) PHI 1 Carpio / Carolino	2–0	(Vietnam) VIE 2 Hau / Loan	Beach volleyball stadium National Sport Complex
December 13, 2009; 13:30 UTC+7; 42 Mins.	(21–14, 21–14)			Beach volleyball stadium National Sport Complex

December 14, 2009; 13:30 UTC+7; 42 Mins.	(Philippines) PHI 1 Carpio / Carolino	0–2	(Thailand) THA 2 Tenpaksee / Sannok	Beach volleyball stadium National Sport Complex
December 14, 2009; 13:30 UTC+7; 42 Mins.	(11–21, 7–21)			Beach volleyball stadium National Sport Complex

December 14, 2009; 14:15 UTC+7; 38 Mins.	(Indonesia) INA 2 Efa / Yokbeth	0–2	(Malaysia) MAS 1 Shun Ting / Teck Hua	Beach volleyball stadium National Sport Complex
December 14, 2009; 14:15 UTC+7; 38 Mins.	(13–21, 24–26)			Beach volleyball stadium National Sport Complex

December 14, 2009; 15:03 UTC+7; 52 Mins.	(Vietnam) VIE 2 Hau / Loan	1–2	(Laos) LAO 1 Phimphone / Vongphachanh	Beach volleyball stadium National Sport Complex
December 14, 2009; 15:03 UTC+7; 52 Mins.	(21–19, 19–21, 10–15)			Beach volleyball stadium National Sport Complex

==== Knockout stage ====
===== Overview =====
Quarterfinals; 15 December
(Thailand) THA 1 Phokongploy / Kulna	21	21
(Philippines) PHI 1 Carpio / Carolino	18	8
(Malaysia) MAS 1 Shun Ting / Teck Hua	29	21
(Laos) LAO 2 Chanaloun / Pany	27	18
(Vietnam) VIE 1 Mai / Yen	19	21
(Indonesia) INA 2 Efa / Yokbeth	21	23
(Thailand) THA 2 Tenpaksee / Sannok	21	21
(Indonesia) INA 1 Ayu / Devota	17	14

Semifinals; 16 December
(Thailand) THA 1 Phokongploy / Kulna	21	21
(Malaysia) MAS 1 Shun Ting / Teck Hua	19	14
(Indonesia) INA 2 Efa / Yokbeth	13	7
(Thailand) THA 2 Tenpaksee / Sannok	21	21

Gold-medal match 17 December
(Thailand) THA 1 Phokongploy / Kulna	21	21
(Thailand) THA 2 Tenpaksee / Sannok	6	0
Bronze-medal match 17 December
(Malaysia) MAS 1 Shun Ting / Teck Hua	21	21
(Indonesia) INA 2 Efa / Yokbeth	13	19

===== Quarterfinals =====
December 15, 2009; 10:00 UTC+7	(Thailand) THA 1 Phokongploy / Kulna	2–0	(Philippines) PHI 1 Carpio / Carolino	Beach volleyball stadium National Sport Complex
December 15, 2009; 10:00 UTC+7	(21–18, 21–8)			Beach volleyball stadium National Sport Complex

December 15, 2009; 11:00 UTC+7; 45 Mins	(Malaysia) MAS 1 Shun Ting / Teck Hua	2–0	(Laos) LAO 2 Chanaloun / Pany	Beach volleyball stadium National Sport Complex
December 15, 2009; 11:00 UTC+7; 45 Mins	(29–27, 21–18)			Beach volleyball stadium National Sport Complex

December 15, 2009; 14:00 UTC+7; 40 Mins	(Vietnam) VIE 1 Mai / Yen	0–2	(Indonesia) INA 2 Efa / Yokbeth	Beach volleyball stadium National Sport Complex
December 15, 2009; 14:00 UTC+7; 40 Mins	(19–21, 21–23)			Beach volleyball stadium National Sport Complex

December 15, 2009; 15:00 UTC+7; 34 Mins	(Thailand) THA 2 Tenpaksee / Sannok	2–0	(Indonesia) INA 1 Ayu / Devota	Beach volleyball stadium National Sport Complex
December 15, 2009; 15:00 UTC+7; 34 Mins	(21–17, 21–14)			Beach volleyball stadium National Sport Complex

===== Semifinals =====
December 16, 2009; 14:00 UTC+7; 40 Mins.	(Thailand) THA 1 Phokongploy / Kulna	2–0	(Malaysia) MAS 1 Shun Ting / Teck Hua	Beach volleyball stadium National Sport Complex
December 16, 2009; 14:00 UTC+7; 40 Mins.	(21–19, 21–14)			Beach volleyball stadium National Sport Complex

December 16, 2009; 15:00 UTC+7; 26 Mins.	(Indonesia) INA 2 Efa / Yokbeth	0–2	(Thailand) THA 2 Tenpaksee / Sannok	Beach volleyball stadium National Sport Complex
December 16, 2009; 15:00 UTC+7; 26 Mins.	(13–21, 7–21)			Beach volleyball stadium National Sport Complex

===== Bronze-medal match =====
December 17, 2009; 11:00 UTC+7; 36 Mins.	(Malaysia) MAS 1 Shun Ting / Teck Hua	2–0	(Indonesia) INA 2 Efa / Yokbeth	Beach volleyball stadium National Sport Complex
December 17, 2009; 11:00 UTC+7; 36 Mins.	(21–13, 21–19)			Beach volleyball stadium National Sport Complex

===== Gold-medal match =====
December 17, 2009	(Thailand) THA 1 Phokongploy / Kulna	2–0	(Thailand) THA 2 Tenpaksee / Sannok	Beach volleyball stadium National Sport Complex
December 17, 2009	(21–6, 21–0)			Beach volleyball stadium National Sport Complex

Gold-medal match forfeit by injury in first set 9:6 for Phokongploy / Kulna

Preceded by 2007	Volleyball at the SEA Games; 2009 SEA Games	Succeeded by 2011
