= PSNKK Club =

Thai volleyball club

PSNKK
- Full name: Prasertnikornkul Club
- Nickname: PSNKK
- League: Thailand League
- 2024–25: 3rd place

The Prasertnikornkul Club (Thai: สโมสรประเสริฐนิกรกุล) also known as the PSNKK Club is a Thai volleyball club based in Bueng Kan and plays in the Volleyball Thailand League.

== History ==
The PSNKK Club was established by Jacky Prasertnikornkul which the team is named after. The team is based in Bueng Kan.

The team won the Pro Challenge earning a promotion for the 2024–25 Volleyball Thailand League season PSNKK finished as third place in the league season.

== Other teams ==
Besides the men's team, PSNKK Club has also an LGBTQ side.

== Honours ==
- Thailand League :
  - Third (1): 2024–25
