= Kitsada Somkane =

Thai volleyball player (born 1990)

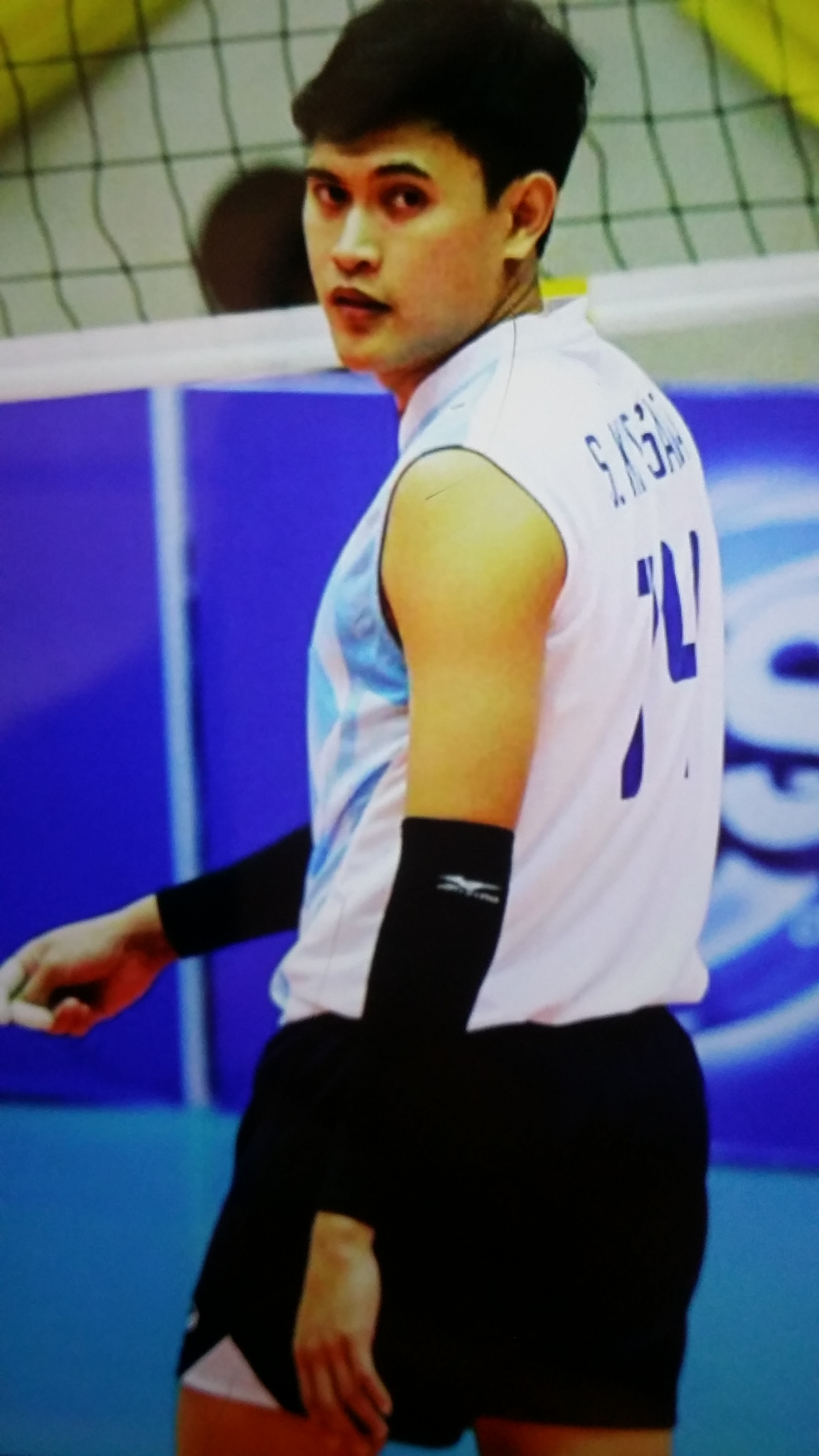

Personal information
- Full name: Kitsada Somkane
- Nickname: Man
- Born: September 28, 1990 (age 36); Surat Thani, Thailand
- Height: 1.90 m (6 ft 3 in)
- Weight: 90 kg (200 lb)
- Spike: 342 cm (135 in)
- Block: 312 cm (123 in)

Volleyball information
- Position: Wing Spiker
- Current club: (Thailand) Payak Sensei
- Number: 14

National team
2007–	Thailand
Honours
Men's volleyball
Representing Thailand
Southeast Asian Games
Bronze medal – third place	2007 Nakhon Ratchasima	Team
Silver medal – second place	2009 Vientiane	Team
Gold medal – first place	2011 Palembang/Jakarta	Team
Gold medal – first place	2013 Naypyidaw	Team
Gold medal – first place	2015 Singapore	Team
Gold medal – first place	2017 Kuala Lumpur	Team
- Last updated: October 2017

Kitsada Somkane or Nguyễn Văn Đa (Thai: กฤษฎา สมคะเน; RTGS: Kritsada Somkhane, born September 28, 1990) is a member of the Thailand men's national volleyball team. He has Vietnamese citizenship.

== Career ==
SomKane played with the club Phitsanulok for the 2014/15 season.

== Clubs ==
- (Thailand) Krung Kao (2010–2011)
- (Thailand) Suandusit (2011–2012)
- (Thailand) Maejo U. Thai-Denmark (2012–2013)
- (Thailand) Kasetsart (2013–2014)
- (Thailand) Phitsanulok (2014–2015)
- (Thailand) Nakhon Ratchasima (2015–2016)
- (Vietnam) Tràng An Ninh Bình (2017)
- (Indonesia) Bekasi BVN (2018)
- (Thailand) Visakha (2018–2021)
- (Thailand) Payak Sensei (2022)

== Awards ==
=== Individuals ===
- 2010–11 Thailand League "Best Scorer"

=== Clubs ===
- 2014 Thai-Denmark Super League - Bronze Medal, with Kasetsart
- 2015–16 Thailand League - Runner-up, with Nakhon Ratchasima
- 2016 Thai-Denmark Super League - Champion, with Nakhon Ratchasima
- 2018–19 Thailand League - Third, with Visakha

== Royal decoration ==
- 2015 – Gold Medalist (Sixth Class) of The Most Admirable Order of the Direkgunabhorn
