= Aung Thu (volleyball) =

Burmese volleyball player (born 1993)

Personal information
- Nationality: Myanmar
- Born: 10 July 1993 (age 33)
- Hometown: Nyaung Shwe
- Height: 190 cm (75 in)
- Weight: 84 kg (185 lb)

Volleyball information
- Position: Outside hitter
- Current club: Toray Arrows
- Number: 20

National team
2010–present	Myanmar

Aung Thu (Burmese: အောင်သူ; born 10 July 1993) is a Burmese volleyball player, playing as an outside hitter. He was part of the Myanmar national volleyball team. He won the bronze medal at the 2015 Southeast Asian Games. He participated at the 2010 and 2014 Asian Games. He also participated in an Asian men's U-23 volleyball championship where Myanmar finished 5th among 16 participating countries.

== Career ==
Thu played with Chonburi from 2012 to 2015.

In October 2018, Aung Thu signed for V.League Division 1 club Toray Arrows.

== Clubs ==
- (Myanmar) Asia World (2011–2012)
- (Thailand) Chonburi E-Tech Air Force (2012–2015)
- (Thailand) Nakhon Ratchasima (2015–2018)
- (Japan) Toray Arrows (2018–2020)

== Awards ==
=== Individual ===
- 2016 Thai-Denmark Super League "Most Valuable Player"
- 2017 Thai-Denmark Super League "Best Spiker"
- 2017–18 Thailand League "Most Valuable Player"

=== Clubs ===
- 2012–13 Thailand League - Bronze medal, with Chonburi
- 2013–14 Thailand League - Runner-up, with Chonburi
- 2014–15 Thailand League - Runner-up, with Chonburi E-Tech Air Force
- 2016 Thai-Denmark Super League - Champion, with Nakhon Ratchasima
- 2016–17 Thailand League - Runner-up, with Nakhon Ratchasima
- 2017 Thai-Denmark Super League - Champion, with Nakhon Ratchasima
- 2017–18 Thailand League - Champion, with Nakhon Ratchasima
- 2018 Thai-Denmark Super League - Bronze medal, with Nakhon Ratchasima
- 2018–19 V.League - Bronze medal, Toray Arrows
