= 2018 Asian Men's Club Volleyball Championship =

2018 Asian Men's Club Championship
Tournament details
- Host country: Myanmar
- City: Naypyidaw
- Dates: 30 July – 6 August
- Teams: 13 (from 1 confederation)
- Venue: 2 (in 1 host city)

Final positions
- Champions: (Iran) Khatam Ardakan (1st title)

Tournament awards
- MVP: (Iran) Hamzeh Zarini (Ardakan)

The 2018 Asian Men's Club Volleyball Championship was the 19th edition of the Asian Men's Club Volleyball Championship, an annual international volleyball club tournament organised by the Asian Volleyball Confederation (AVC) with Myanmar Volleyball Federation (MVF). The tournament was held in Naypyidaw, Myanmar from 30 July to 6 August 2018. The champions qualified for the 2018 FIVB Volleyball Men's Club World Championship instead of the 2017 champions Sarmayeh Bank Tehran, who withdrew from the 2018 Club World Championship.

== Qualification ==
The 13 AVC member associations submitted their men's club to the 2018 Asian Club Championship. The 13 AVC member associations were from 4 zonal associations, including, Central Asia (5 teams), East Asia (4 teams), Oceania (1 team) and Southeast Asia (3 teams).

=== Qualified teams ===
The following teams qualified for the tournament.

Association	Team	Means of qualification
Myanmar	Asia World	
Australia	Canberra Heat	
China	Sichuan	2016–17 Chinese Volleyball League winners
Chinese Taipei	Long Power	2017–18 Enterprise Volleyball League winners
Hong Kong	Yan Chai	
Iran	Khatam Ardakan	2017–18 Iranian Volleyball Super League winners
Japan	Toray Arrows	2016–17 V.Premier League winners
Kazakhstan	Atyrau	
Pakistan	Wapda	
Sri Lanka	Lanka Lions	
Thailand	Nakhon Ratchasima	2017–18 Volleyball Thailand League winners
Turkmenistan	Binagar	
Vietnam	Sanest Khánh Hòa	2017 Volleyball Vietnam League winners

== Pools composition ==
This was the first Asian Club Championship which used the new competition format. Following the 2017 AVC Board of Administration's unanimous decision, the new format saw teams were drawn into four pools up to the total amount of the participating teams. Each team as well as the hosts was assigned into a pool according to their final standing of the 2017 edition. As the three best ranked teams were drawn in the same pool A, the next best three contested pool B, the next best four contested pool C. Final standing of the 2017 edition are shown in brackets.

Pool A	Pool B	Pool C	Pool D
Iran (1)	China (6)	Thailand (9)	Myanmar (Hosts)
Japan (2)	Chinese Taipei (7)	Australia (10)	Pakistan
Kazakhstan (4)	Vietnam (8)	Sri Lanka (11)	Turkmenistan
		Hong Kong (13)	

== Venues ==
- Wunna Theikdi Sports Complex – Hall B, Naypyidaw, Myanmar
- Wunna Theikdi Sports Complex – Hall C, Naypyidaw, Myanmar

== Pool standing procedure ==
1. Number of matches won
2. Match points
3. Sets ratio
4. Points ratio
5. If the tie continues as per the point ratio between two teams, the priority will be given to the team which won the last match between them. When the tie in points ratio is between three or more teams, a new classification of these teams in the terms of points 1, 2 and 3 will be made taking into consideration only the matches in which they were opposed to each other.

Match won 3–0 or 3–1: 3 match points for the winner, 0 match points for the loser
Match won 3–2: 2 match points for the winner, 1 match point for the loser

== Preliminary round ==
- All times are Myanmar Standard Time (UTC+06:30).

=== Pool A ===
Pos	Team	Pld	W	L	Pts	SW	SL	SR	SPW	SPL	SPR	Qualification
1	(Iran) Khatam Ardakan	2	2	0	6	6	1	6.000	179	163	1.098	Quarterfinals
2	(Kazakhstan) Atyrau	2	1	1	2	4	5	0.800	196	198	0.990	Quarterfinals
3	(Japan) Toray Arrows	2	0	2	1	2	6	0.333	179	193	0.927	Quarterfinals

Date	Time	Venue		Score		Set 1	Set 2	Set 3	Set 4	Set 5	Total	Report
30 Jul	16:00	WTC	Khatam Ardakan	3–1	Atyrau	20–25	25–20	25–20	25–22		95–87	P2
31 Jul	13:30	WTB	Khatam Ardakan	3–0	Toray Arrows	25–22	25–22	34–32			84–76	P2
1 Aug	13:50	WTB	Toray Arrows	2–3	Atyrau	25–22	23–25	25–22	19–25	11–15	103–109	P2

=== Pool B ===
Pos	Team	Pld	W	L	Pts	SW	SL	SR	SPW	SPL	SPR	Qualification
1	(Vietnam) Sanest Khánh Hòa	2	2	0	6	6	1	6.000	174	143	1.217	Playoffs
2	(Chinese Taipei) Long Power	2	1	1	2	4	5	0.800	188	193	0.974	Playoffs
3	(China) Sichuan	2	0	2	1	2	6	0.333	158	184	0.859	Playoffs

Date	Time	Venue		Score		Set 1	Set 2	Set 3	Set 4	Set 5	Total	Report
30 Jul	16:00	WTB	Sichuan	2–3	Long Power	18–25	25–22	25–21	14–25	13–15	95–108	P2
31 Jul	16:00	WTC	Sanest Khánh Hòa	3–1	Long Power	25–17	23–25	25–22	25–16		98–80	P2
1 Aug	16:45	WTB	Sichuan	0–3	Sanest Khánh Hòa	22–25	24–26	17–25			63–76	P2

=== Pool C ===
Pos	Team	Pld	W	L	Pts	SW	SL	SR	SPW	SPL	SPR	Qualification
1	(Sri Lanka) Lanka Lions	3	3	0	8	9	2	4.500	258	191	1.351	Playoffs
2	(Thailand) Nakhon Ratchasima	3	2	1	7	8	4	2.000	268	236	1.136	Playoffs
3	(Australia) Canberra Heat	3	1	2	2	4	8	0.500	239	274	0.872	Playoffs
4	(Hong Kong) Yan Chai	3	0	3	1	2	9	0.222	192	256	0.750	Playoffs

Date	Time	Venue		Score		Set 1	Set 2	Set 3	Set 4	Set 5	Total	Report
30 Jul	13:30	WTB	Nakhon Ratchasima	3–0	Yan Chai	25–15	25–12	25–18			75–45	P2
30 Jul	13:30	WTC	Canberra Heat	0–3	Lanka Lions	20–25	21–25	9–25			50–75	P2
31 Jul	11:00	WTB	Nakhon Ratchasima	3–1	Canberra Heat	25–17	25–19	18–25	25–22		93–83	P2
31 Jul	13:30	WTC	Yan Chai	0–3	Lanka Lions	12–25	12–25	17–25			41–75	P2
1 Aug	11:00	WTB	Lanka Lions	3–2	Nakhon Ratchasima	20–25	23–25	25–16	25–23	15–11	108–100	P2
1 Aug	13:30	WTC	Canberra Heat	3–2	Yan Chai	22–25	19–25	25–22	25–22	15–12	106–106	P2

=== Pool D ===
Pos	Team	Pld	W	L	Pts	SW	SL	SR	SPW	SPL	SPR	Qualification
1	(Pakistan) Wapda	2	2	0	5	6	2	3.000	176	160	1.100	Playoffs
2	(Myanmar) Asia World	2	1	1	3	3	4	0.750	155	161	0.963	Playoffs
3	(Turkmenistan) Binagar	2	0	2	1	3	6	0.500	186	196	0.949	Playoffs

Date	Time	Venue		Score		Set 1	Set 2	Set 3	Set 4	Set 5	Total	Report
30 Jul	11:05	WTB	Asia World	3–1	Binagar	25–16	25–23	21–25	25–21		96–85	P2
31 Jul	16:00	WTB	Asia World	0–3	Wapda	24–26	19–25	16–25			59–76	P2
1 Aug	16:00	WTC	Wapda	3–2	Binagar	17–25	25–21	25–17	18–25	15–13	100–101	P2

== Final round ==
- All times are Myanmar Standard Time (UTC+06:30).

Playoffs
3 August
(Thailand) Nakhon Ratchasima	3
(Turkmenistan) Binagar	2
3 August
(Vietnam) Sanest Khánh Hòa	3
(Australia) Canberra Heat	0
3 August
(Chinese Taipei) Long Power	3
(Hong Kong) Yan Chai	1
3 August
(Sri Lanka) Lanka Lions	3
(Myanmar) Asia World	2
3 August
(China) Sichuan	0
(Pakistan) Wapda	3

Quarterfinals
4 August
(Iran) Khatam Ardakan	3
(Thailand) Nakhon Ratchasima	0
4 August
(Vietnam) Sanest Khánh Hòa	3
(Chinese Taipei) Long Power	0
4 August
(Kazakhstan) Atyrau	3
(Sri Lanka) Lanka Lions	1
4 August
(Japan) Toray Arrows	2
(Pakistan) Wapda	3

Semifinals
5 August
(Iran) Khatam Ardakan	3
(Vietnam) Sanest Khánh Hòa	0
5 August
(Kazakhstan) Atyrau	3
(Pakistan) Wapda	2

Final
6 August
(Iran) Khatam Ardakan	3
(Kazakhstan) Atyrau	0
3rd place match
6 August
(Vietnam) Sanest Khánh Hòa	2
(Pakistan) Wapda	3

5th–8th semifinals
5 August
(Chinese Taipei) Long Power	2
(Thailand) Nakhon Ratchasima	3
5 August
(Japan) Toray Arrows	3
(Sri Lanka) Lanka Lions	1

5th place match
6 August
(Thailand) Nakhon Ratchasima	1
(Japan) Toray Arrows	3
7th place match
6 August
(Chinese Taipei) Long Power	0
(Sri Lanka) Lanka Lions	3

13th place match
4 August
(Turkmenistan) Binagar	0
(Myanmar) Asia World	3

9th–12th semifinal
4 August
(Australia) Canberra Heat	3
(China) Sichuan	2

9th place match
5 August
(Australia) Canberra Heat	3
(Hong Kong) Yan Chai	0
11th place match
5 August
(China) Sichuan	0
(Myanmar) Asia World	3

=== Playoffs ===
Date	Time	Venue		Score		Set 1	Set 2	Set 3	Set 4	Set 5	Total	Report
3 Aug	11:00	WTB	Nakhon Ratchasima	3–2	Binagar	25–23	25–18	23–25	19–25	15–8	107–99	P2
3 Aug	11:00	WTC	Long Power	3–1	Yan Chai	25–18	25–20	17–25	25–17		92–80	P2
3 Aug	13:30	WTC	Sanest Khánh Hòa	3–0	Canberra Heat	25–19	25–23	25–17			75–59	P2
3 Aug	13:45	WTB	Sichuan	0–3	Wapda	23–25	22–25	22–25			67–75	P2
3 Aug	16:00	WTB	Lanka Lions	3–2	Asia World	25–15	21–25	25–20	23–25	15–13	109–98	P2

=== Quarterfinals ===
Date	Time	Venue		Score		Set 1	Set 2	Set 3	Set 4	Set 5	Total	Report
4 Aug	11:00	WTB	Khatam Ardakan	3–0	Nakhon Ratchasima	25–22	25–23	25–23			75–68	P2
4 Aug	11:00	WTC	Sanest Khánh Hòa	3–0	Long Power	25–16	25–12	25–17			75–45	P2
4 Aug	13:30	WTB	Toray Arrows	2–3	Wapda	21–25	25–16	25–23	29–31	20–22	120–117	P2
4 Aug	16:05	WTC	Atyrau	3–1	Lanka Lions	21–25	25–20	25–21	25–17		96–83	P2

=== 9th–12th semifinal ===
Date	Time	Venue		Score		Set 1	Set 2	Set 3	Set 4	Set 5	Total	Report
4 Aug	13:30	WTC	Canberra Heat	3–2	Sichuan	25–23	15–25	25–19	14–25	15–10	94–102	P2

=== 5th–8th semifinals ===
Date	Time	Venue		Score		Set 1	Set 2	Set 3	Set 4	Set 5	Total	Report
5 Aug	13:30	WTC	Long Power	2–3	Nakhon Ratchasima	18–25	26–24	25–21	20–25	19–21	108–116	P2
5 Aug	16:30	WTC	Toray Arrows	3–1	Lanka Lions	25–20	19–25	25–20	25–21		94–86	P2

=== Semifinals ===
Date	Time	Venue		Score		Set 1	Set 2	Set 3	Set 4	Set 5	Total	Report
5 Aug	16:00	WTB	Khatam Ardakan	3–0	Sanest Khánh Hòa	25–18	25–23	25–19			75–60	P2
5 Aug	18:30	WTB	Atyrau	3–2	Wapda	14–25	32–30	25–16	18–25	15–11	104–107	P2

=== 13th place match ===
Date	Time	Venue		Score		Set 1	Set 2	Set 3	Set 4	Set 5	Total	Report
4 Aug	16:30	WTB	Binagar	0–3	Asia World	21–25	18–25	13–25			52–75	P2

=== 11th place match ===
Date	Time	Venue		Score		Set 1	Set 2	Set 3	Set 4	Set 5	Total	Report
5 Aug	13:30	WTB	Sichuan	0–3	Asia World	20–25	18–25	20–25			58–75	P2

=== 9th place match ===
Date	Time	Venue		Score		Set 1	Set 2	Set 3	Set 4	Set 5	Total	Report
5 Aug	18:55	WTC	Canberra Heat	3–0	Yan Chai	25–11	25–22	25–17			75–50	P2

=== 7th place match ===
Date	Time	Venue		Score		Set 1	Set 2	Set 3	Set 4	Set 5	Total	Report
6 Aug	11:00	WTB	Long Power	0–3	Lanka Lions	23–25	22–25	24–26			69–76	P2

=== 5th place match ===
Date	Time	Venue		Score		Set 1	Set 2	Set 3	Set 4	Set 5	Total	Report
6 Aug	13:30	WTB	Nakhon Ratchasima	1–3	Toray Arrows	21–25	25–22	21–25	18–25		85–97	P2

=== 3rd place match ===
Date	Time	Venue		Score		Set 1	Set 2	Set 3	Set 4	Set 5	Total	Report
6 Aug	16:00	WTB	Sanest Khánh Hòa	2–3	Wapda	25–19	21–25	25–16	20–25	16–18	107–103	P2

=== Final ===
Date	Time	Venue		Score		Set 1	Set 2	Set 3	Set 4	Set 5	Total	Report
6 Aug	18:45	WTB	Khatam Ardakan	3–0	Atyrau	29–27	25–23	25–22			79–72	P2

== Final standing ==
Rank	Team
1st place, gold medalist(s)	(Iran) Khatam Ardakan
2nd place, silver medalist(s)	(Kazakhstan) Atyrau
3rd place, bronze medalist(s)	(Pakistan) Wapda
4	(Vietnam) Sanest Khánh Hòa
5	(Japan) Toray Arrows
6	(Thailand) Nakhon Ratchasima
7	(Sri Lanka) Lanka Lions
8	(Chinese Taipei) Long Power
9	(Australia) Canberra Heat
10	(Hong Kong) Yan Chai
11	(Myanmar) Asia World
12	(China) Sichuan
13	(Turkmenistan) Binagar

Qualified for the 2018 Club World Championship

2018 Asian Men's Club Champions

1st title

14–man roster
Mahmoudi, Valaei, Razipour, Zarini, Gholami, Senobar, Amiri, Mahdavi (c), Jalali, Rahimi, R. Yousefi, M. Yousefi, Jahandideh, Mobasheri
Head coach
Mirhosseini

== Awards ==
- Most valuable player
  (Iran) Hamzeh Zarini (Khatam Ardakan)
- Best setter
  (Kazakhstan) Roman Khandrolin (Atyrau)
- Best outside spikers
  (Iran) Hossein Amiri (Khatam Ardakan)
  (Kazakhstan) Aibat Netalin (Atyrau)
- Best middle blockers
  (Iran) Adel Gholami (Khatam Ardakan)
  (Vietnam) Nguyễn Dinh Nhu (Sanest Khánh Hòa)
- Best opposite spiker
  (Pakistan) Aimal Khan (Wapda)
- Best libero
  (Iran) Mojtaba Yousefi (Khatam Ardakan)

== See also ==
- 2018 Asian Women's Club Volleyball Championship
