= 2018 Men's Volleyball Kor Royal Cup =

2018 Men's Kor Royal Cup
Tournament details
- Host country: Sisaket, Thailand
- Dates: 27 June – 1 July
- Teams: 6
- Venue: 1 (in 1 host city)

Final positions
- Champions: Royal Thai Air Force (N/Ath title)
- Runners-up: Royal Thai Army
- Third place: Fine Chef Saraburi
- Fourth place: Cambodia

The 2018 Men's Volleyball Kor Royal Cup was the latest edition of the Men's Volleyball Kor Royal Cup, the tournament patronized by Princess Maha Chakri Sirindhorn, The Princess Royal of Thailand for men's senior volleyball clubs, also known as 2018 Sealect Tuna Men's Senior Volleyball Kor Royal Cup Thailand Championship due to the sponsorship deal with Sealect Tuna. A total of 6 teams will compete in the tournament.

== Teams ==
Team	Qualified as
Royal Thai Air Force	Thailand League member
Fine Chef Saraburi	Thailand League member
Royal Thai Army	Wild Card
Royal Thai Marine Corps	Wild Card
Cambodia	Wild Card

== Round robin ==
All times are Indochina Time (UTC+07:00).

=== Standing procedure ===
1. Number of matches won
2. Match points
3. Sets ratio
4. Points ratio
5. If the tie continues as per the point ratio between two teams, the priority will be given to the team which won the last match between them. When the tie in points ratio is between three or more teams, a new classification of these teams in the terms of points 1, 2 and 3 will be made taking into consideration only the matches in which they were opposed to each other.

Match won 3–0 or 3–1: 3 match points for the winner, 0 match points for the loser
Match won 3–2: 2 match points for the winner, 1 match point for the loser

=== Standing ===
Pos	Team	Pld	W	L	Pts	SW	SL	SR	SPW	SPL	SPR
1	Royal Thai Air Force	4	4	0	12	12	1	12.000	320	243	1.317
2	Royal Thai Army	4	3	1	9	10	4	2.500	345	330	1.045
3	Fine Chef Saraburi	4	2	2	6	6	7	0.857	299	305	0.980
4	Cambodia	4	1	3	3	4	10	0.400	303	338	0.896
5	Royal Thai Marine Corps	4	0	4	0	2	12	0.167	321	372	0.863

Date	Time		Score		Set 1	Set 2	Set 3	Set 4	Set 5	Total	Report
27 มิ.ย.	12:00	Royal Thai Air Force	3–0	Royal Thai Marine Corps	25–19	25–19	25–19			75–57	
27 มิ.ย.	14:00	Royal Thai Army	3–0	Fine Chef Saraburi	26–24	25–21	25–16			76–61	
28 มิ.ย.	12:00	Royal Thai Marine Corps	1–3	Cambodia	28–26	17–25	21–25	23–25		89–101	
28 มิ.ย.	14:00	Royal Thai Air Force	3–0	Fine Chef Saraburi	25–21	25–21	25–20			75–62	
29 มิ.ย.	12:00	Fine Chef Saraburi	3–1	Royal Thai Marine Corps	25–22	23–25	25–17	26–24		99–88	
29 มิ.ย.	14:00	Royal Thai Army	3–1	Cambodia	25–18	25–17	18–25	29–27		97–87	
30 มิ.ย.	10:00	Royal Thai Army	3–1	Royal Thai Marine Corps	25–23	22–25	25–19	25–20		97–87	
30 มิ.ย.	12:00	Royal Thai Air Force	3–0	Cambodia	25–23	25–14	25–12			75–49	
1 ก.ค.	12:00	Fine Chef Saraburi	3–0	Cambodia	25–18	27–25	25–23			77–66	
1 ก.ค.	14:00	Royal Thai Air Force	3–1	Royal Thai Army	25–13	25–15	20–25	25–22		95–75	

== Final standings ==
อันดับ	ทีม
1st place, gold medalist(s)	Royal Thai Air Force
2nd place, silver medalist(s)	Royal Thai Army
3rd place, bronze medalist(s)	Fine Chef Saraburi
4	Cambodia
5	Royal Thai Marine Corps
