= Visakha Volleyball Club =

Thai volleyball club

- Full name: Visakha
- Short name: Visakha
- Founded: 2016
- Ground: Ramkhamhaeng University Gymnasium; Bangkok, Thailand
- Chairman: (Thailand) Taweesak Prasit-aon
- Manager: (Thailand) Sarin Karnket
- Captain: (Thailand) Kitsada Somkane
- League: Thailand League
- 2019–20: 7th place ▼2

Uniforms
Home	Away

Visakha is a male professional volleyball team based in Bangkok, Thailand. The club was founded in 2016 and plays in the Thailand league.

== Honours ==
- Domestic competitions
- Thailand League :
  - Third (1): 2018–19
- Thai-Denmark Super League :
  - Runner-up (1): 2018
  - Third (1): 2017
- Academy League U18 Thailand League
  - Runner-up (1): 2017

== Former names ==
- NK Fitness Samutsakhon (2016–2017)
- Visakha (2018–)

== League results ==
League		Position	Teams	Matches	Win	Lose
Thailand League
Thailand League	2016–17	4th place	8	14	9	5
Thailand League	2017–18	4th place	8	14	7	7
Thailand League	2018–19	3rd place	8	16	9	6
Thailand League	2019–20	5th place	8	13	6	7
Thailand League	2020–21	7th place	8	7	1	6

== Current squad ==
As of November 2019

- Head coach: (Thailand) Sarin Karnket

Team roster 2019–20
No.	Name	Position	Height (m)	Date of birth	Country
1	Chanathip Jumpasaen	Setter	1.83	23 February 1994 (age 32)	Thailand
2	Rachan Prakobparn	Libero	1.83	27 December 2000 (age 25)	Thailand
3	Jakkapong Tongklang	Libero	1.73	1 May 1995 (age 31)	Thailand
4	Kriadkoon Jaisaen	Middle blocker	1.87	10 October 1990 (age 35)	Thailand
5	Supachai Prajong	Middle blocker	1.83	15 July 1995 (age 30)	Thailand
6	Siwapol Suwannasri	Middle blocker	1.95	7 October 1996 (age 29)	Thailand
10	Pattarapon Buoput	Middle blocker	1.90	16 October 1990 (age 35)	Thailand
11	Sirithep Passadu	Outside hitter	1.87	5 December 1995 (age 30)	Thailand
13	Kongkapan Thongkao	Setter	1.83	15 January 2001 (age 25)	Thailand
14	Kitsada Somkane (c)	Opposite	1.90	28 July 1990 (age 35)	Thailand
15	Marck Espejo	Outside hitter	1.91	1 May 1997 (age 29)	Philippines
16	Kaio Fábio Rocha	Outside hitter	2.08	15 August 1986 (age 39)	Brazil
17	Chuthipong Sukornyotin	Outside hitter	1.87	7 March 1992 (age 34)	Thailand
18	Wuttiporn Yookong	Opposite	1.83	18 November 1993 (age 32)	Thailand
19	Thanathip Kulprakobkit	Opposite	1.92	1 June 1999 (age 27)	Thailand
20	Hirun Saekang	Opposite	1.78	3 May 2001 (age 25)	Thailand
21	Suttichai Kammee	Opposite	1.70	5 September 2000 (age 25)	Thailand
23	Archaradech Kaewwanna	Middle-Blocker	1.83	25 June 2001 (age 25)	Thailand

== Head coach ==
Season	Name	Country
2016–2017	Suthee Sitthi	Thailand
2017–Present	Sarin Karnket	Thailand

== Imports ==
Season	Number	Player	Country
2016–17	6	Henry Chan	(Hong Kong) Hongkong
2017–18
2017–18	8	May Rasmey	Cambodia
2017–18	19	Shi Jungeng	China
2017–18	20	Wu Zhai	China
2018–19
2018–19	6	Rodrigo Da sill va	Brazil
2018–19	20	Wu Zhai	China
2019-20	15	Marck Jesus Espejo	Philippines
2019-20	16	Kaio Fábio Rocha	Brazil

== Notable players ==
Domestic Players

Thailand

- Sanan Nantayanan
- Nammon Warapa
- Kodchagorn Pongpat
- Khanit Sinlapasorn
- Yossapol Wattana
- Supachai Prajong
- Sirithep Passadu
- Adipong Phonpinyo
- Sittichai Pochaka
- Yuttana Deeraksa
- Nattawut Panjit
- Monthakarn Kotchaborrirak
- Kitsada Singam
- Ratchapoom Samthong

Foreigner Players

Hong Kong

- Henry Chan (2017)

China

- Wu Zhai (2018)
- Shi Jingeng (2018),(2018–2019)

Cambodia

- May Rasmey (2017–2018)

Brazil

- Rodrigo Da sill va (2018–2019)
- Kaio Fábio Rocha (2019–2020)

Philippines

- Marck Espejo (2019–2020)
