= 2017 Men's Volleyball Thai-Denmark Super League =

Tournament details
- Host country: MCC Hall of The Mall Bangkapi Bangkok, Thailand
- Dates: 22–26 March 2017
- Teams: 6
- Venue: 1 (in 1 host city)

Tournament awards
- MVP: (Thailand) Wanchai Tabwises

2017 Men's Volleyball Thai-Denmark Super League (Thai: วอลเลย์บอลชายไทยเดนมาร์คซูเปอร์ลีก 2017) was the fourth edition of the tournament. It was held at the MCC Hall of The Mall Bangkapi in Bangkok, Thailand from 22 to 26 March 2017.

== Teams ==
- (Thailand) Air Force
- (Thailand) Nakhon Ratchasima
- (Thailand) Samanun Koh Kood Cabana Ratchaburi
- (Thailand) NK Fitness Samutsakhon
- (Thailand) Diamond Food RMUTL Phitsanulok
- (Thailand) Kasetsart

== Pools composition ==
Pool A	Pool B
(Thailand) Air Force; (Thailand) NK Fitness Samutsakhon; (Thailand) Kasetsart	(Thailand) Nakhon Ratchasima; (Thailand) Samanun Koh Kood Cabana Ratchaburi; (Thailand) Diamond Food RMUTL Phitsanulok

== Preliminary round ==
=== Pool A ===
Pos	Team	Pld	W	L	Pts	SW	SL	SR	SPW	SPL	SPR	Qualification
1	(Thailand) Air Force	2	2	0	6	6	1	6.000	173	131	1.321	Semifinals
2	(Thailand) NK Fitness Samutsakhon	2	1	1	2	4	5	0.800	193	190	1.016	Semifinals
3	(Thailand) Kasetsart	2	0	2	1	2	6	0.333	140	185	0.757	

Date	Time		Score		Set 1	Set 2	Set 3	Set 4	Set 5	Total	Report
22 Mar	11:30	Air Force (Thailand)	3–1	(Thailand) NK Fitness Samutsakhon	23–25	25–20	25–20	25–18		98–83	
23 Mar	11:30	Air Force (Thailand)	3–0	(Thailand) Kasetsart	25–20	25–15	25–13			75–48	
24 Mar	11:30	NK Fitness Samutsakhon (Thailand)	3–2	(Thailand) Kasetsart	23–25	22–25	25–22	25–11	15–9	110–92	

=== Pool B ===
Pos	Team	Pld	W	L	Pts	SW	SL	SR	SPW	SPL	SPR	Qualification
1	(Thailand) Nakhon Ratchasima	2	2	0	5	6	3	2.000	198	180	1.100	Semifinals
2	(Thailand) Diamond Food RMUTL Phitsanulok	2	1	1	3	4	4	1.000	180	186	0.968	Semifinals
3	(Thailand) Samanun Koh Kood Cabana Ratchaburi	2	0	2	1	3	6	0.500	190	202	0.941	

Date	Time		Score		Set 1	Set 2	Set 3	Set 4	Set 5	Total	Report
22 Mar	14:00	Nakhon Ratchasima (Thailand)	3–1	(Thailand) Diamond Food RMUTL Phitsanulok	25–20	20–25	25–19	25–17		95–81	
23 Mar	14:00	Nakhon Ratchasima (Thailand)	3–2	(Thailand) Samanun Koh Kood Cabana Ratchaburi	19–25	25–20	19–25	25–17	15–12	103–99	
24 Mar	14:00	Diamond Food RMUTL Phitsanulok (Thailand)	3–1	(Thailand) Samanun Koh Kood Cabana Ratchaburi	25–23	25–18	22–25	27–25		99–91	

== Final round ==
Semifinals
25 March
(Thailand) Air Force	3
(Thailand) Diamond Food RMUTL Phitsanulok	1
25 March
(Thailand) Nakhon Ratchasima	3
(Thailand) NK Fitness Samutsakhon	0

Final
26 March
(Thailand) Air Force	1
(Thailand) Nakhon Ratchasima	3

=== Semifinals ===
Date	Time		Score		Set 1	Set 2	Set 3	Set 4	Set 5	Total	Report
25 Mar	11:30	Air Force (Thailand)	3–1	(Thailand) Diamond Food RMUTL Phitsanulok	25–18	29–31	25–15	26–24		105–88	
25 Mar	14:00	Nakhon Ratchasima (Thailand)	3–0	(Thailand) NK Fitness Samutsakhon	25–17	25–22	25–20			75–59	

=== Final ===
Date	Time		Score		Set 1	Set 2	Set 3	Set 4	Set 5	Total	Report
26 Mar	15:30	Air Force (Thailand)	1–3	(Thailand) Nakhon Ratchasima	26–24	21–25	13–25	22-25		82–74	

== Final standing ==
Rank	Team
1st place, gold medalist(s)	(Thailand) Nakhon Ratchasima
2nd place, silver medalist(s)	(Thailand) Air Force
3rd place, bronze medalist(s)	(Thailand) Diamond Food RMUTL Phitsanulok
3rd place, bronze medalist(s)	(Thailand) NK Fitness Samutsakhon
5	(Thailand) Kasetsart
5	(Thailand) Samanun Koh Kood Cabana Ratchaburi

== Awards ==
Award	Winner	Team
MVP	(Thailand) Wanchai Tabwises	Nakhon Ratchasima
Best scorer	(Thailand) Kantapat Koonmee	Air force
Best spiker	(Myanmar) Aung Thu	Nakhon Ratchasima
Best blocker	(Thailand) Kittipong Suksala	Nakhon Ratchasima
Best server	(Thailand) Kissada Nilsawai	Air force
Best setter	(Thailand) Boonyarid Wongtorn	Nakhon Ratchasima
Best libero	(Thailand) Thannarak Ruensee	Air force

== See also ==
- 2017 Women's Volleyball Thai-Denmark Super League
