= 2019 Men's Volleyball Thai-Denmark Super League =

Tournament details
- Host country: MCC Hall of The Mall Bangkapi Bangkok, Thailand
- Dates: 19–23 March 2019
- Teams: 6
- Venue: 1 (in 1 host city)

Tournament awards
- MVP: Rivan Nurmulki

2019 Men's Volleyball Thai-Denmark Super League (Thai: วอลเลย์บอลชายไทยเดนมาร์คซูเปอร์ลีก 2019) was the sixth edition of the tournament. It was held at the MCC Hall of The Mall Bangkapi in Bangkok, Thailand from 19 to 23 March 2019.

== Foreign players ==
Men's Thai-Denmark Super League national foreign players
Team	Player 1	Player 2	Player 3
Air Force	(Kyrgyzstan) Roman Shirov (AVC)	(Sri Lanka) Janita Surat (AVC)	—N/a
Nakhon Ratchasima The Mall	(Brazil) Dougla Bueno (CSV)	(Sri Lanka) Deepthi Romash (AVC)	(Indonesia) Rivan Nurmulki (AVC)
Diamond Food Saraburi	(Chinese Taipei) Liu Hong-Min (AVC)	(Chinese Taipei) Liu Hong-Jie (AVC)	(Chinese Taipei) Wang Min-Chun (AVC)
NK Fitness Samutsakhon	(Japan) Daichi Yanagawa (AVC)	—N/a	—N/a
Visakha	(Brazil) Rodrigo Da sill va (CSV)	(China) Wu Zhai (AVC)	—N/a
RMUTL Phitsanulok	—N/a	—N/a	—N/a

== Pools composition ==
Pool A	Pool B
(Thailand) Air Force; (Thailand) Nakhon Ratchasima The Mall; (Thailand) NK Fitness Samutsakorn	(Thailand) Diamond Food Saraburi; (Thailand) Visakha; (Thailand) RMUTL Phitsanulok

== Preliminary round ==
Qualified for the semifinals

=== Pool A ===
Pos	Team	Pld	W	L	Pts	SW	SL	SR	SPW	SPL	SPR	Qualification
1	(Thailand) Air Force	2	2	0	5	6	2	3.000	194	170	1.141	Semifinals
2	(Thailand) Nakhon Ratchasima The Mall	2	1	1	4	5	4	1.250	207	188	1.101	Semifinals
3	(Thailand) NK Fitness Samutsakorn	2	0	2	0	1	6	0.167	136	179	0.760	

Date	Time		Score		Set 1	Set 2	Set 3	Set 4	Set 5	Total	Report
19 Mar	11:00	Air Force (Thailand)	3–2	(Thailand) Nakhon Ratchasima The Mall	25–27	25–23	21–25	25–19	17–15	113–109	Report
20 Mar	11:00	Air Force (Thailand)	3–0	(Thailand) NK Fitness Samutsakorn	25–12	31–29	25–20			81–61	Report
21 Mar	11:00	Nakhon Ratchasima The Mall (Thailand)	3–1	(Thailand) NK Fitness Samutsakorn	25–14	23–25	25–18	25–18		98–75	Report

=== Pool B ===
Pos	Team	Pld	W	L	Pts	SW	SL	SR	SPW	SPL	SPR	Qualification
1	(Thailand) Diamond Food Saraburi	2	1	1	4	5	3	1.667	189	189	1.000	Semifinals
2	(Thailand) RMUTL Phitsanulok	2	1	1	3	3	4	0.750	180	186	0.968	Semifinals
3	(Thailand) Visakha	2	1	1	2	4	5	0.800	209	203	1.030	

Date	Time		Score		Set 1	Set 2	Set 3	Set 4	Set 5	Total	Report
19 Mar	13:20	Diamond Food Saraburi (Thailand)	2–3	(Thailand) Visakha	25–16	22–25	25–18	22–25	16–18	110–102	Report
20 Mar	13:20	Diamond Food Saraburi (Thailand)	3–0	(Thailand) RMUTL Phitsanulok	37–35	25–23	25–21			87–79	Report
21 Mar	13:20	RMUTL Phitsanulok (Thailand)	3–1	(Thailand) Visakha	29–27	18–25	25–20	29–27		101–99	Report

== Final round ==
Semifinals
22 March
(Thailand) Air Force	3
(Thailand) RMUTL Phitsanulok	0
22 March
(Thailand) Diamond Food Saraburi	1
(Thailand) Nakhon Ratchasima The Mall	3

Final
23 March
(Thailand) Air Force
(Thailand) Nakhon Ratchasima The Mall

=== Semifinals ===
Date	Time		Score		Set 1	Set 2	Set 3	Set 4	Set 5	Total	Report
22 Mar	10.45	Air Force (Thailand)	3–0	(Thailand) RMUTL Phitsanulok	25–15	39–37	26–24			90–76	
22 Mar	13:05	Diamond Food Saraburi (Thailand)	1–3	(Thailand) Nakhon Ratchasima The Mall	25–22	17–25	25–14	25–20		92–81	

=== Final ===
Date	Time		Score		Set 1	Set 2	Set 3	Set 4	Set 5	Total	Report
23 Mar	12:20	Air Force (Thailand)	2–3	(Thailand) Nakhon Ratchasima The Mall	24–26	25–19	25–18	21–25	10–15	105–103	

== Final standing ==
Rank	Team
1st place, gold medalist(s)	(Thailand) Nakhon Ratchasima The Mall
2nd place, silver medalist(s)	(Thailand) Air Force
3rd place, bronze medalist(s)	(Thailand) Diamond Food Saraburi
3rd place, bronze medalist(s)	(Thailand) RMUTL Phitsanulok
5	(Thailand) Visakha
5	(Thailand) NK Fitness Samutsakorn

== Awards ==
Award	Winner	Team
MVP	(Indonesia) Rivan Nurmulki	Nakhon Ratchasima The Mall

== See also ==
- 2019 Women's Volleyball Thai-Denmark Super League
