= Nakhon Ratchasima Men's Volleyball Club =

Thai volleyball club

Nakhon Ratchasima
- Full name: Nakhon Ratchasima
- Nickname: Cat Devil
- Founded: 2005; 21 years ago
- Ground: The Mall Nakhon Ratchasima; Nakhon Ratchasima, Thailand (Capacity: 2,500)
- Chairman: Chatchawan Wongjorn
- Head coach: Weeramate Phergsongkror
- League: Thailand League
- 2024–25: Champions

Uniforms
Home	Away

Nakhon Ratchasima is a male professional volleyball team based in Nakhon Ratchasima, Thailand.and this is a most champion in the history of Thailand league volleyball in 2023–2024 season is the 9 th champion's for this clubs.

== Honours ==
=== Domestic competitions ===
- Thailand League :
  - Champion (9): 2007–08, 2012–13, 2013–14, 2014–15, 2017–18, 2019–20, 2020–21, 2022–23, 2023–24, 2024–25
  - Runner-up (3): 2010–11, 2015–16, 2016–17
  - Third (2): 2009–10, 2021–22
- Thai-Denmark Super League :
  - Champion (3): 2016, 2017, 2019
  - Runner-up (1): 2014
  - Third (1): 2018

=== International competitions ===
- AVC Champions League
  - 2015 — 9th place
  - 2018 — 6th place
  - 2021 — 4th place
  - 2024 — Cancelled
  - 2025 — 5th place

== League results ==
League		Position	Teams	Matches	Win	Lose
Thailand League
Thailand League	2007–08	Champion	8	14	14	0
Thailand League	2008–09	4th place	8	14	11	3
Thailand League	2009–10	3rd place	8	14	12	2
Thailand League	2010–11	Runner-up	8	14	13	1
Thailand League	2011–12	4th place	8	14	11	3
Thailand League	2012–13	Champion	8	14	13	1
Thailand League	2013–14	Champion	8	14	13	1
Thailand League	2014–15	Champion	8	14	13	1
Thailand League	2015–16	Runner-up	8	14	12	2
Thailand League	2016–17	Runner-up	8	14	12	2
Thailand League	2017–18	Champion	8	14	13	1
Thailand League	2018–19	4th place	8	15	9	6
Thailand League	2019–20	Champion	8	19	17	2
Thailand League	2020–21	Champion	8	17	15	1
Thailand League	2022–23	Champion	8	17	17	0
Thailand League	2023–24	Champion				
Thailand League	2024–25	Champion	8	17	17	0

== Current squad ==
As of February 2023

Team roster 2023–24
Number	Player	Position	Height (m)	Weight (kg)	Birth date	Country
2	Jakkrit Thanomnoi	Outside Hitter	1.85	90	8 June 2003 (age 23)	Thailand
3	Wanchai Tabwises (c)	Outside Hitter	1.85	85	12 February 1986 (age 40)	Thailand
4	Islomjon Sobirov	Opposite	2.00	89	7 February 1995 (age 31)	Uzbekistan
7	Azizbek Kuchkorov	Middle Blocker	2.00	95	16 December 1999 (age 26)	Uzbekistan
8	Chakkrit Chandahuadong	Outside Hitter	1.83	85	5 December 1996 (age 29)	Thailand
9	Nantawut Taengkrathok	Middle Blocker	1.90	91	4 March 1990 (age 36)	Thailand
10	Boonyarid Wongtorn	Setter	1.84	73	21 January 1998 (age 28)	Thailand
13	Jirawan Thumtong	Outside Hitter	1.80	85	23 February 1999 (age 27)	Thailand
14	Tanapat Charoensuk	Libero	1.74	73	14 May 1991 (age 35)	Thailand
16	Takorn Chuaymee	Middle Blocker	1.90	80	25 November 1999 (age 26)	Thailand
17	Saranchit Charoensuk	Setter	1.81	75	7 October 1987 (age 38)	Thailand
19	Farhan Halim	Outside Hitter	1.93	83	26 April 2001 (age 25)	Indonesia
20	Noppawit Hengkrathok	Libero	1.70	63	28 August 2001 (age 25)	Thailand
22	Anurak Phanram	Outside Hitter	1.83	75	23 August 1999 (age 27)	Thailand
23	Jakkapong Tongklang	Libero	1.73	73	1 August 1995 (age 31)	Thailand
24	Sattaya Wadeesirisak	Outside Hitter	1.88	78	25 April 2003 (age 23)	Thailand
25	Kissada Nilsawai	Middle Blocker	2.02	110	17 April 1992 (age 34)	Thailand
25	Kittipong Suksala	Middle Blocker	2.04	125	3 October 1997 (age 28)	Thailand

== Head coach ==
Season	Name	Country
2010–2015	Padejsuk Wannachot	Thailand
2015–2018	Prasert tangmueng	Thailand
2019–2022	Padejsuk Wannachot	Thailand
2022–2023	Anusorn Bundit	Thailand
2023–Present	Weeramate Phergsongkror	Thailand

== Notable players ==
Domestic Players

Thailand

- Pisanu Harnkhomtun
- Yuranan Buadang
- Bussarin Maholan
- Kitsada Somkane
- Arthit Wongthon
- Nattapong Kesapan
- Pariyawat Paiboon
- Krauwut Hwangphunklang
- Surapong Polsawat
- Jetsadakorn Nusee
- Pitak Ausoongnoen
- Wutthikrai Torrobrum
- Somporn Wannaprapa
- Ratchanon Chaichalasang
- Aekkapob Namwijit
- Morhamad Chenjang
- Thanat Bamrungphakdi
- Yootana Tangthong
- Chanchai Chongfunggang
- Phirayut Phetphun
- Pongpisit Chattongsoo
- Thanachot Thongdoung
- Yossapol Wattana
- Kongkapan Thongkhao

Foreigner Players

Myanmar

- Myo Min Oo (2013–2014)
- Aung Thu (2014–2018)

Brazil

- Dougla Bueno (2018–2019)
- Pablo Femando (2018–2019)

Sri Lanka

- Deepthi Romash (2018–2019)
- Janita Surath (2019–2020),(2021–22)

Indonesia

- Rivan Nurmulki (2019)
- Galih Bayu Saputra (2020–21)
- Farhan Halim (2023–24)
- Doni Haryono (2024–25)

Pakistan

- Almal Khan (2019–2020)

Kazakhstan

- Sergey Rezanov (2021–22)

Uzbekistan

- Islomjon Sobirov (2021–22),(2023–24)
- Azizbek Kuchkorov (2021–2025)

Mongolia

- Khangal Tamiraa (2022–2025)
