= 2018 Men's Volleyball Thai-Denmark Super League =

Tournament details
- Host country: MCC Hall of The Mall Bangkapi Bangkok, Thailand
- Dates: 28 March – 1 April 2018
- Teams: 6
- Venue: 1 (in 1 host city)

Tournament awards
- MVP: (Kyrgyzstan) Kanybek Uulu Onelbek

2018 Men's Volleyball Thai-Denmark Super League (Thai: วอลเลย์บอลชายไทยเดนมาร์คซูเปอร์ลีก 2018) was the fifth edition of the tournament. It was held at the MCC Hall of The Mall Bangkapi in Bangkok, Thailand from 28 March to 1 April 2018.

== Teams ==
=== Foreign players ===
Men's Thai-Denmark Super League national foreign players
Team	Player 1	Player 2	Player 3
Air Force	(Kyrgyzstan) Kanybek Uulu Onelbek (AVC)	(Sri Lanka) Janita Surat (AVC)	—N/a
Nakhon Ratchasima The Mall	(Myanmar) Aung Thu (AVC)	—N/a	—N/a
Diamond Food RMUTL Phitsanulok	(Brazil) Luiz Perezto (CSV)	(Brazil) Pablo Femando (CSV)	—N/a
Visakha Volleyball Club	(Cambodia) Raksmey My (AVC)	(China) Wu Zhai (AVC)	(China) Shi Jingeng (AVC)
Samanan Ratchaburi	(Myanmar) Zaw Htet Aung (AVC)	(Myanmar) Thwin Htoo Zin (AVC)	—N/a
Cosmo Chiang Rai	—N/a	—N/a	—N/a

== Pools composition ==
Pool A	Pool B
(Thailand) Nakhon Ratchasima The Mall; (Thailand) Diamond Food Phitsanulok; (Thailand) Visakha	(Thailand) Air Force; (Thailand) Cosmo Chiang Rai; (Thailand) Samanun Ratchaburi

== Preliminary round ==
=== Pool A ===
Pos	Team	Pld	W	L	Pts	SW	SL	SR	SPW	SPL	SPR	Qualification
1	(Thailand) Nakhon Ratchasima The Mall	2	1	1	4	5	3	1.667	182	171	1.064	Semifinals
2	(Thailand) Visakha	2	1	1	3	3	3	1.000	136	139	0.978	Semifinals
3	(Thailand) Diamond Food Phitsanulok	2	1	1	2	3	5	0.600	174	182	0.956	

Date	Time		Score		Set 1	Set 2	Set 3	Set 4	Set 5	Total	Report
28 Mar	10:45	Nakhon Ratchasima The Mall (Thailand)	3–0	(Thailand) Visakha	25–22	25–22	25–17			75–61	
29 Mar	10:45	Nakhon Ratchasima The Mall (Thailand)	2–3	(Thailand) Diamond Food Phitsanulok	26–28	25–22	18–25	25–20	13–15	107–110	
30 Mar	10:45	Visakha (Thailand)	3–0	(Thailand) Diamond Food Phitsanulok	25–22	25–20	25–22			75–64	

=== Pool B ===
Pos	Team	Pld	W	L	Pts	SW	SL	SR	SPW	SPL	SPR	Qualification
1	(Thailand) Samanun Ratchaburi	2	2	0	5	6	3	2.000	202	193	1.047	Semifinals
2	(Thailand) Air Force	2	1	1	4	5	3	1.667	177	156	1.135	Semifinals
3	(Thailand) Cosmo Chiang Rai	2	0	2	0	1	6	0.167	145	175	0.829	

Date	Time		Score		Set 1	Set 2	Set 3	Set 4	Set 5	Total	Report
28 Mar	13:15	Air Force (Thailand)	3–0	(Thailand) Cosmo Chiang Rai	25–15	25–17	25–22			75–54	
29 Mar	13:15	Air Force (Thailand)	2–3	(Thailand) Samanun Ratchaburi	25–18	25–19	20–25	22–25	10–15	102–102	
30 Mar	13:15	Cosmo Chiang Rai (Thailand)	1–3	(Thailand) Samanun Ratchaburi	26–28	25–22	20–25	20–25		91–100	

== Final round ==
Semifinals
31 March
(Thailand) Nakhon Ratchasima	2
(Thailand) Air Force	3
31 March
(Thailand) Visakha	3
(Thailand) Samanun Ratchaburi	0

Final
1 April
(Thailand) Air Force	3
(Thailand) Visakha	0

=== Semifinals ===
Date	Time		Score		Set 1	Set 2	Set 3	Set 4	Set 5	Total	Report
31 Mar	10:45	Nakhon Ratchasima The Mall (Thailand)	2–3	(Thailand) Air Force	25–15	22–25	18–25	25–20	11–15	101–100	
31 Mar	13:15	Visakha (Thailand)	3–0	(Thailand) Samanun Ratchaburi	28–26	25–20	25–21	–	–	78–67	

=== Final ===
Date	Time		Score		Set 1	Set 2	Set 3	Set 4	Set 5	Total	Report
1 Apr	12:30	Air Force (Thailand)	3–0	(Thailand) Visakha	25–22	25–12	25–20	–	–	75–54	

== Final standing ==
Rank	Team
1st place, gold medalist(s)	(Thailand) Air Force
2nd place, silver medalist(s)	(Thailand) Visakha
3rd place, bronze medalist(s)	(Thailand) Nakhon Ratchasima The Mall
3rd place, bronze medalist(s)	(Thailand) Samanun Ratchaburi
5	(Thailand) Diamond Food Phitsanulok
5	(Thailand) Cosmo Chiang Rai

== Awards ==
Award	Winner	Team
MVP	(Kyrgyzstan) Kanybek Uulu Onelbek	Air Force
Best scorer	(Kyrgyzstan) Kanybek Uulu Onelbek	Air Force
Best opposite spiker	(Kyrgyzstan) Kanybek Uulu Onelbek	Air Force
Best blocker 1st	(Thailand) Kissada Nilsawai	Air Force
Best blocker 2nd	(Thailand) Kittipong Suksala	Nakhon Ratchasima
Best outside hitter 1st	(Thailand) Kantapat Koonmee	Air Force
Best outside hitter 2nd	(Brazil) Luiz Perezto	Diamond Food RMUTL
Best server	(Sri Lanka) Janita Surat	Air Force
Best setter	(Thailand) Saranchit Charoensuk	Nakhon Ratchasima
Best libero	(Thailand) Jakkapong Tongklang	Visakha

== See also ==
- 2018 Women's Volleyball Thai-Denmark Super League
