= 2021 Asian Men's Volleyball Championships squads =

Volleyball championship squads

This article shows the rosters of all participating teams at the 2021 Asian Championship in Japan.

== Pool A ==
=== Japan ===
The following is the Japanese roster in the 2021 Asian Men's Volleyball Championship.

Head Coach: (Japan) Yuichi Nakagaichi

No.	Name	Date of birth	Height	Weight	Spike	Block	2020–21 club
2	Taishi Onodera	27 February 1996	2.01 m (6 ft 7 in)	98 kg (216 lb)	346 cm (136 in)	323 cm (127 in)	(Japan) JT Thunders
3	Naonobu Fujii	5 January 1992	1.83 m (6 ft 0 in)	78 kg (172 lb)	312 cm (123 in)	297 cm (117 in)	(Japan) Toray Arrows
4	Issei Otake	3 December 1995	2.01 m (6 ft 7 in)	98 kg (216 lb)	345 cm (136 in)	327 cm (129 in)	(Japan) Panasonic Panthers
5	Tatsunori Otsuka	5 November 2000	1.94 m (6 ft 4 in)	80 kg (180 lb)	338 cm (133 in)	325 cm (128 in)	(Japan) Waseda University
6	Akihiro Yamauchi	30 November 1993	2.04 m (6 ft 8 in)	80 kg (180 lb)	350 cm (140 in)	335 cm (132 in)	(Japan) Panasonic Panthers
7	Kenta Takanashi	25 March 1997	1.89 m (6 ft 2 in)	78 kg (172 lb)	337 cm (133 in)	320 cm (130 in)	(Japan) Wolf Dogs Nagoya
9	Taichi Fukuyama	20 December 1993	1.91 m (6 ft 3 in)	78 kg (172 lb)	335 cm (132 in)	325 cm (128 in)	(Japan) JTEKT Stings
12	Ran Takahashi	2 September 2001	1.88 m (6 ft 2 in)	72 kg (159 lb)	343 cm (135 in)	315 cm (124 in)	(Japan) Nippon Sport Science University
13	Masaki Oya	23 April 1995	1.78 m (5 ft 10 in)	70 kg (150 lb)	320 cm (130 in)	310 cm (120 in)	(Japan) Suntory Sunbirds
14	Yūki Ishikawa (c)	11 December 1995	1.91 m (6 ft 3 in)	84 kg (185 lb)	351 cm (138 in)	327 cm (129 in)	(Italy) Power Volley Milano
15	Haku Lee	27 December 1990	1.93 m (6 ft 4 in)	82 kg (181 lb)	344 cm (135 in)	330 cm (130 in)	(Japan) Toray Arrows
17	Tomohiro Ogawa	4 July 1996	1.76 m (5 ft 9 in)	66 kg (146 lb)	305 cm (120 in)	270 cm (110 in)	(Japan) Wolf Dogs Nagoya
19	Kento Miyaura	22 February 1999	1.89 m (6 ft 2 in)	73 kg (161 lb)	339 cm (133 in)	320 cm (130 in)	(Japan) JTEKT Stings
20	Tomohiro Yamamoto	5 November 1994	1.71 m (5 ft 7 in)	69 kg (152 lb)	301 cm (119 in)	299 cm (118 in)	(Japan) Sakai Blazers

=== India ===
The following is the Indian roster in the 2021 Asian Men's Volleyball Championship.

Head Coach: (India) G. E. Sridharan

No.	Name	Date of birth	Height	Weight	Spike	Block	2020–21 club
2	Karthik Ashok (c)	24 January 1995	2.00 m (6 ft 7 in)	87 kg (192 lb)	354 cm (139 in)	345 cm (136 in)	—N/a
3	Ashwal Rai	2 February 1993	2.02 m (6 ft 8 in)	87 kg (192 lb)	360 cm (140 in)	345 cm (136 in)	—N/a
5	Prince Malik	10 April 1999	2.04 m (6 ft 8 in)	89 kg (196 lb)	—N/a	—N/a	—N/a
6	Ajitlal Chandran	14 February 1996	1.92 m (6 ft 4 in)	69 kg (152 lb)	345 cm (136 in)	333 cm (131 in)	—N/a
7	Shon T John	5 January 1997	1.93 m (6 ft 4 in)	81 kg (179 lb)	346 cm (136 in)	331 cm (130 in)	—N/a
8	Chirag Yadav	11 November 2000	1.96 m (6 ft 5 in)	76 kg (168 lb)	—N/a	—N/a	—N/a
11	Ashwin Raj Mahesh	9 November 1998	1.98 m (6 ft 6 in)	85 kg (187 lb)	—N/a	—N/a	—N/a
12	Jerome Vinith Charles	26 January 1992	1.98 m (6 ft 6 in)	90 kg (200 lb)	349 cm (137 in)	340 cm (130 in)	—N/a
13	Vinith Kumar	25 February 1991	1.96 m (6 ft 5 in)	85 kg (187 lb)	345 cm (136 in)	338 cm (133 in)	—N/a
14	Shubham Chaudhary	23 December 1993	2.03 m (6 ft 8 in)	80 kg (180 lb)	—N/a	—N/a	—N/a
16	Muthusamy Appavu	10 July 1997	1.92 m (6 ft 4 in)	72 kg (159 lb)	—N/a	—N/a	—N/a
19	Vikas Tomar	15 April 1999	1.77 m (5 ft 10 in)	69 kg (152 lb)	—N/a	—N/a	—N/a
20	Kamlesh Khatik	7 October 1991	1.76 m (5 ft 9 in)	82 kg (181 lb)	310 cm (120 in)	290 cm (110 in)	—N/a

=== Qatar ===
The following is the Qatari roster in the 2021 Asian Men's Volleyball Championship.

Head Coach: (Argentina) Camilo Andres Soto

No.	Name	Date of birth	Height	Weight	Spike	Block	2020–21 club
1	Youssef Oughlaf	6 April 1989	2.03 m (6 ft 8 in)	80 kg (180 lb)	341 cm (134 in)	327 cm (129 in)	Qatar S.C.
3	Assam Ahmed Mahmoud	20 February 1987	1.95 m (6 ft 5 in)	80 kg (180 lb)	310 cm (120 in)	295 cm (116 in)	(Qatar) Police S.C.
4	Renan Ribeiro	30 December 1989	1.93 m (6 ft 4 in)	85 kg (187 lb)	325 cm (128 in)	300 cm (120 in)	(Qatar) Al Arabi S.C.
5	Saad Sulaiman	14 February 1996	1.92 m (6 ft 4 in)	69 kg (152 lb)	345 cm (136 in)	333 cm (131 in)	(Qatar) Al Rayyan S.C.
7	Belal Nabel Abunabot	1 January 1991	2.00 m (6 ft 7 in)	95 kg (209 lb)	335 cm (132 in)	330 cm (130 in)	(Qatar) Al Rayyan S.C.
8	Mahmoud Naji	26 December 1992	1.79 m (5 ft 10 in)	75 kg (165 lb)	—N/a	—N/a	(Qatar) Police S.C.
9	Milos Stevanovic	27 July 1988	1.92 m (6 ft 4 in)	85 kg (187 lb)	320 cm (130 in)	310 cm (120 in)	(Qatar) Al Rayyan S.C.
10	Nadir Ababacar Sadikh	2 February 1986	1.95 m (6 ft 5 in)	90 kg (200 lb)	310 cm (120 in)	300 cm (120 in)	(Qatar) Police S.C.
11	Nikola Vasic	4 June 1989	1.90 m (6 ft 3 in)	85 kg (187 lb)	340 cm (130 in)	320 cm (130 in)	(Qatar) Al-Wakrah S.C.
12	Mubarak Dahi Hammed	1 April 1991	2.01 m (6 ft 7 in)	92 kg (203 lb)	330 cm (130 in)	315 cm (124 in)	(Qatar) Al Rayyan S.C.
16	Mohamed Ibrahim Ibrahim (c)	15 January 1985	2.06 m (6 ft 9 in)	90 kg (200 lb)	360 cm (140 in)	336 cm (132 in)	(Qatar) Al Arabi S.C.
17	Ahmed Jamaledeen Nohaman	8 February 1994	2.02 m (6 ft 8 in)	85 kg (187 lb)	330 cm (130 in)	310 cm (120 in)	(Qatar) Al Rayyan S.C.
20	Khamlesh Shamyed	4 April 1995	1.90 m (6 ft 3 in)	80 kg (180 lb)	300 cm (120 in)	298 cm (117 in)	(Qatar) Al-Gharafa S.C.
21	Osman Wagihalla	1 January 1993	1.95 m (6 ft 5 in)	75 kg (165 lb)	315 cm (124 in)	300 cm (120 in)	(Qatar) Police S.C.

=== Bahrain ===
The following is the Bahraini roster in the 2021 Asian Men's Volleyball Championship.

Head Coach: (Brazil) Marco Queiroga

No.	Name	Date of birth	Height	Weight	Spike	Block	2020–21 club
1	Ali Khairalla	23 August 1989	1.70 m (5 ft 7 in)	—N/a	—N/a	—N/a	
2	Hasain Abdulla Sultan	29 August 2000	1.67 m (5 ft 6 in)	57 kg (126 lb)	277 cm (109 in)	282 cm (111 in)	(Bahrain) Dar Kulaib
3	Abbas Alkhabbaz	9 August 1989	1.89 m (6 ft 2 in)	92 kg (203 lb)	—N/a	—N/a	—N/a
5	Mahmood Hasan (c)	23 April 1984	1.83 m (6 ft 0 in)	86 kg (190 lb)	—N/a	—N/a	—N/a
6	Ali Ebrahim	4 October 1991	1.83 m (6 ft 0 in)	87 kg (192 lb)	—N/a	—N/a	—N/a
7	Mahmood Alafyah	19 December 1993	1.81 m (5 ft 11 in)	71 kg (157 lb)	324 cm (128 in)	—N/a	—N/a
8	Mahmood Abdulwahed	19 February 1996	1.84 m (6 ft 0 in)	82 kg (181 lb)	—N/a	—N/a	—N/a
10	Mahmood Anan	30 April 1995	1.92 m (6 ft 4 in)	81 kg (179 lb)	—N/a	—N/a	—N/a
11	Ali Habib	21 March 1988	1.77 m (5 ft 10 in)	70 kg (150 lb)	—N/a	—N/a	—N/a
12	Hussain Aljeshi	16 September 1991	1.95 m (6 ft 5 in)	81 kg (179 lb)	—N/a	—N/a	—N/a
13	Ali Alsairafi	27 August 1989	1.97 m (6 ft 6 in)	95 kg (209 lb)	—N/a	—N/a	—N/a
15	Naser Anan	16 December 1992	1.86 m (6 ft 1 in)	80 kg (180 lb)	—N/a	—N/a	—N/a
17	Mohamed Yaqoob	8 July 1994	1.79 m (5 ft 10 in)	67 kg (148 lb)	—N/a	—N/a	—N/a
18	Mahmood Abdul Hussain	20 January 1999	1.82 m (6 ft 0 in)	71 kg (157 lb)	316 cm (124 in)	293 cm (115 in)	(Egypt) Al Ahly

== Pool B ==
=== Iran ===
The following is the Iranian roster in the 2021 Asian Men's Volleyball Championship.

Head Coach: (Iran) Behrouz Ataei

No.	Name	Date of birth	Height	Weight	Spike	Block	2020–21 club
1	Mahdi Jelveh	21 May 2001	2.08 m (6 ft 10 in)	85 kg (187 lb)	355 cm (140 in)	330 cm (130 in)	(Iran) Foolad Sirjan
2	Milad Ebadipour (c)	17 October 1993	1.96 m (6 ft 5 in)	78 kg (172 lb)	350 cm (140 in)	310 cm (120 in)	(Poland) PGE Skra Belchatow
3	Reza Abedini	19 May 1991	2.03 m (6 ft 8 in)	93 kg (205 lb)	354 cm (139 in)	348 cm (137 in)	(Iran) ZShahdab Yazd
5	Amir Hossein Toukhteh	9 April 2001	2.03 m (6 ft 8 in)	79 kg (174 lb)	350 cm (140 in)	325 cm (128 in)	(Slovenia) ACH Volley
6	Aliasghar Mojarad	30 October 1997	2.05 m (6 ft 9 in)	90 kg (200 lb)	330 cm (130 in)	310 cm (120 in)	(Iran) Shahrdari Varamin
7	Esmaeil Mosafer	21 November 1997	1.92 m (6 ft 4 in)	71 kg (157 lb)	310 cm (120 in)	290 cm (110 in)	(Iran) PAS
8	Mohammad Reza Hazratpour	31 March 1999	1.87 m (6 ft 2 in)	87 kg (192 lb)	300 cm (120 in)	290 cm (110 in)	(Iran) Shahrdari Urmia
10	Meisam Salehi	17 November 1998	1.98 m (6 ft 6 in)	89 kg (196 lb)	345 cm (136 in)	330 cm (130 in)	(Iran) Shahrdari Urmia
11	Saber Kazemi	24 December 1998	2.05 m (6 ft 9 in)	87 kg (192 lb)	340 cm (130 in)	325 cm (128 in)	(Iran) Foolad Sirjan
12	Amir Hossein Esfandiar	24 January 1999	2.09 m (6 ft 10 in)	110 kg (240 lb)	330 cm (130 in)	310 cm (120 in)	(Belgium) Greenyard Maaseik
13	Ali Ramezani	5 May 1998	2.00 m (6 ft 7 in)	103 kg (227 lb)	330 cm (130 in)	310 cm (120 in)	(Iran) Haraz Amol
14	Javad Karimi	1 March 1998	2.04 m (6 ft 8 in)	104 kg (229 lb)	330 cm (130 in)	310 cm (120 in)	(Belgium) Greenyard Maaseik
17	Amin Esmaeilnejad	17 December 1996	2.03 m (6 ft 8 in)	90 kg (200 lb)	343 cm (135 in)	332 cm (131 in)	(Iran) SAIPA
19	Abolfazl Gholipour	21 January 1993	1.78 m (5 ft 10 in)	63 kg (139 lb)	295 cm (116 in)	275 cm (108 in)	(Iran) Rahyab Melal Marivan

=== Pakistan ===
The following is the Pakistani roster in the 2021 Asian Men's Volleyball Championship.

Head Coach: (Iran) Rahman Mohammadirad

No.	Name	Date of birth	Height	Weight	Spike	Block	2020–21 club
1	Muhammad Hamad	18 February 1998	1.95 m (6 ft 5 in)	70 kg (150 lb)	319 cm (126 in)	303 cm (119 in)	—N/a
3	Usman Faryad Ali	22 May 1999	1.93 m (6 ft 4 in)	70 kg (150 lb)	326 cm (128 in)	306 cm (120 in)	—N/a
6	Sheraz Sheraz	27 October 1993	1.99 m (6 ft 6 in)	81 kg (179 lb)	324 cm (128 in)	295 cm (116 in)	—N/a
7	Mubashar Raza	1 January 1992	1.91 m (6 ft 3 in)	84 kg (185 lb)	320 cm (130 in)	290 cm (110 in)	—N/a
8	Khan Aimal (c)	10 August 1990	2.04 m (6 ft 8 in)	80 kg (180 lb)	335 cm (132 in)	310 cm (120 in)	(Turkey) Akkuş Belediyespor
9	Fakhar Ud Din	1 December 1995	1.92 m (6 ft 4 in)	91 kg (201 lb)	340 cm (130 in)	310 cm (120 in)	—N/a
11	Murad Khan	2 March 2000	2.04 m (6 ft 8 in)	90 kg (200 lb)	342 cm (135 in)	335 cm (132 in)	—N/a
13	Muhammad Kashif Naveed	1 January 1994	1.9 m (6 ft 3 in)	79 kg (174 lb)	305 cm (120 in)	285 cm (112 in)	—N/a
14	Abdul Zaheer	25 February 1996	2.01 m (6 ft 7 in)	89 kg (196 lb)	340 cm (130 in)	315 cm (124 in)	—N/a
16	Afaq Khan	26 March 2000	1.96 m (6 ft 5 in)	65 kg (143 lb)	—N/a	—N/a	—N/a
17	Hamid Yazman	20 March 1998	1.93 m (6 ft 4 in)	71 kg (157 lb)	323 cm (127 in)	296 cm (117 in)	—N/a
18	Musawer Khan	—N/a	—N/a	—N/a	—N/a	—N/a	—N/a
19	Nasir Ali	12 May 1992	1.74 m (5 ft 9 in)	65 kg (143 lb)	290 cm (110 in)	271 cm (107 in)	—N/a
20	Maaz Ullah Khan	—N/a	—N/a	—N/a	—N/a	—N/a	—N/a

=== Thailand ===
The following is the Thai roster in the 2021 Asian Men's Volleyball Championship.

Head Coach: (Thailand) Titiracht Kasudom

No.	Name	Date of birth	Height	Weight	Spike	Block	2020–21 club
3	Jakkrapong Tongklang	1 August 1995	1.73 m (5 ft 8 in)	73 kg (161 lb)	300 cm (120 in)	295 cm (116 in)	(Thailand) Visakha VC
4	Anut Promchan	13 June 1997	1.94 m (6 ft 4 in)	86 kg (190 lb)	335 cm (132 in)	315 cm (124 in)	(Thailand) Phitsanulok VC
6	Jirapat Bunka	29 May 1998	1.93 m (6 ft 4 in)	83 kg (183 lb)	335 cm (132 in)	320 cm (130 in)	(Thailand) Diamond Food
8	Kittithad Nuwaddee	26 May 1998	1.87 m (6 ft 2 in)	77 kg (170 lb)	330 cm (130 in)	310 cm (120 in)	(Thailand) Phitsanulok VC
10	Aekkawee Bangsri	30 May 1998	1.88 m (6 ft 2 in)	74 kg (163 lb)	320 cm (130 in)	310 cm (120 in)	(Thailand) Phitsanulok VC
11	Kroekpong Pensuk	27 November 2000	1.93 m (6 ft 4 in)	86 kg (190 lb)	325 cm (128 in)	315 cm (124 in)	(Thailand) Diamond Food
12	Thanathat Thaweerat	14 February 2000	1.89 m (6 ft 2 in)	76 kg (168 lb)	325 cm (128 in)	315 cm (124 in)	(Thailand) More Asia Kohkood Cabana
13	Yodsapong Wattana	27 May 1995	1.94 m (6 ft 4 in)	80 kg (180 lb)	325 cm (128 in)	320 cm (130 in)	(Thailand) Prince VC
17	Adipong Phonpinyo (c)	12 September 1991	1.77 m (5 ft 10 in)	70 kg (150 lb)	295 cm (116 in)	280 cm (110 in)	(Thailand) Diamond Food
18	Montri Puanglib	24 March 1990	1.67 m (5 ft 6 in)	70 kg (150 lb)	311 cm (122 in)	281 cm (111 in)	(Thailand) Prince VC
19	Wuttithaporn Yookong	18 November 1993	1.85 m (6 ft 1 in)	77 kg (170 lb)	325 cm (128 in)	300 cm (120 in)	(Thailand) Police Club
20	Soranan Nuampara	26 June 2000	1.97 m (6 ft 6 in)	99 kg (218 lb)	320 cm (130 in)	310 cm (120 in)	(Thailand) Diamond Food
22	Chaipipat Buaket	28 November 1998	1.82 m (6 ft 0 in)	77 kg (170 lb)	310 cm (120 in)	290 cm (110 in)	(Thailand) Prince VC
23	Assanaphan Chantajorn	7 December 1999	1.91 m (6 ft 3 in)	82 kg (181 lb)	320 cm (130 in)	310 cm (120 in)	(Thailand) More Asia Kohkood Cabana

=== Hong Kong ===
The following is the Hong Kong roster in the 2021 Asian Men's Volleyball Championship.

Head Coach: (Hong Kong) Hok Chun Yau

No.	Name	Date of birth	Height	Weight	Spike	Block	2020–21 club
2	Chin To Au	13 February 1996	1.87 m (6 ft 2 in)	92 kg (203 lb)	325 cm (128 in)	315 cm (124 in)	(Hong Kong) Ling Yat
3	Chi Wing Lau	23 March 1996	1.76 m (5 ft 9 in)	68 kg (150 lb)	320 cm (130 in)	315 cm (124 in)	(Hong Kong) Aspiring
4	Ho Yin Leung	26 August 1998	1.84 m (6 ft 0 in)	81 kg (179 lb)	330 cm (130 in)	320 cm (130 in)	(Hong Kong) Dragon Team
5	Yi Kit Cheung	16 August 1999	—N/a	—N/a	—N/a	—N/a	(Hong Kong) Lo Kon Ting
6	Cheuk Hin Lam	30 August 1994	1.85 m (6 ft 1 in)	83 kg (183 lb)	320 cm (130 in)	310 cm (120 in)	(Hong Kong) Wing Fai
7	Chun Hin So (c)	12 July 1996	1.88 m (6 ft 2 in)	76 kg (168 lb)	330 cm (130 in)	315 cm (124 in)	(Hong Kong) Lo Kon Ting
8	Pak Fai Chow	19 April 1996	1.75 m (5 ft 9 in)	68 kg (150 lb)	310 cm (120 in)	294 cm (116 in)	(Hong Kong) Yan Chai
19	Ki Fung Lam	9 December 1994	2.01 m (6 ft 7 in)	90 kg (200 lb)	—N/a	—N/a	(Hong Kong) Yan Chai
15	Sze Wai Yuen	22 January 1995	1.76 m (5 ft 9 in)	65 kg (143 lb)	—N/a	—N/a	(Hong Kong) Lai Kan
16	Chi Leung Poon	30 January 1997	1.88 m (6 ft 2 in)	74 kg (163 lb)	329 cm (130 in)	315 cm (124 in)	(Hong Kong) Aspiring
17	Yi Chun Lam	11 April 2001	—N/a	—N/a	—N/a	—N/a	(Hong Kong) Green Dragon
18	Chun Ho Damian Tam	20 April 2001	1.86 m (6 ft 1 in)	80 kg (180 lb)	—N/a	—N/a	(Hong Kong) Green Dragon
19	Chun Hong Lai	21 October 2000	—N/a	—N/a	—N/a	—N/a	(Hong Kong) Youth Wah Ching
18	Ngai Yiu Cheung	27 October 2002	1.86 m (6 ft 1 in)	64 kg (141 lb)	—N/a	—N/a	(Hong Kong) Yan Chai

== Pool C ==
=== Australia ===
The following is the Australian roster in the 2021 Asian Men's Volleyball Championship.

Head Coach: (Brazil) Marcos Miranda

No.	Name	Date of birth	Height	Weight	Spike	Block	2020–21 club
2	Arshdeep Dosanjh	30 July 1996	2.05 m (6 ft 9 in)	85 kg (187 lb)	358 cm (141 in)	340 cm (130 in)	(France) Grand Nancy
6	Thomas Edgar	21 June 1986	2.12 m (6 ft 11 in)	106 kg (234 lb)	357 cm (141 in)	341 cm (134 in)	(Japan) JT Thunders
7	James Weir	20 July 1995	2.04 m (6 ft 8 in)	95 kg (209 lb)	355 cm (140 in)	342 cm (135 in)	(Germany) Netzhoppers Königs Wusterhausen
8	Trent O'Dea	11 April 1994	2.01 m (6 ft 7 in)	98 kg (216 lb)	354 cm (139 in)	344 cm (135 in)	Australia VA
9	Max Staples	27 July 1994	1.94 m (6 ft 4 in)	83 kg (183 lb)	358 cm (141 in)	345 cm (136 in)	(Belgium) Tectum Achel
11	Luke Perry	20 November 1995	1.80 m (5 ft 11 in)	75 kg (165 lb)	331 cm (130 in)	315 cm (124 in)	(France) Tours VB
12	Nehemiah Mote (c)	21 June 1993	2.03 m (6 ft 8 in)	98 kg (216 lb)	367 cm (144 in)	354 cm (139 in)	(Germany) Berlin Recycling Volleys
20	Thomas Hodges	4 July 1994	1.97 m (6 ft 6 in)	95 kg (209 lb)	350 cm (140 in)	338 cm (133 in)	(Australia) Canberra Heat
21	Nicholas Butler	27 July 1997	1.98 m (6 ft 6 in)	95 kg (209 lb)	345 cm (136 in)	333 cm (131 in)	Australia VA
22	Curtis Stockton	22 April 1993	1.98 m (6 ft 6 in)	95 kg (209 lb)	354 cm (139 in)	334 cm (131 in)	(Japan) Oita Miyoshi Weisse Adler
27	Max Senica	19 August 1999	1.91 m (6 ft 3 in)	85 kg (187 lb)	349 cm (137 in)	330 cm (130 in)	(Denmark) Nordenskov UIF
35	Malachi Murch	4 January 1995	1.97 m (6 ft 6 in)	75 kg (165 lb)	341 cm (134 in)	335 cm (132 in)	(Denmark) Nordenskov UIF

=== China ===
The following is the Chinese roster in the 2021 Asian Men's Volleyball Championship.

Head Coach: (China) Wu Sheng

No.	Name	Date of birth	Height	Weight	Spike	Block	2020–21 club
2	Jiang Chuan (c)	9 August 1994	2.05 m (6 ft 9 in)	91 kg (201 lb)	365 cm (144 in)	345 cm (136 in)	(China) Beijing BAIC
4	Zhang Binglong	11 July 1994	1.97 m (6 ft 6 in)	99 kg (218 lb)	355 cm (140 in)	345 cm (136 in)	(China) Beijing BAIC
5	Yang Yiming	29 July 1999	1.86 m (6 ft 1 in)	80 kg (180 lb)	310 cm (120 in)	320 cm (130 in)	(China) Zhejiang Lottery
6	Yu Yuantai	3 December 1997	1.83 m (6 ft 0 in)	75 kg (165 lb)	320 cm (130 in)	310 cm (120 in)	(China) Jiangsu
7	Yu YaoChen	19 August 1995	1.95 m (6 ft 5 in)	89 kg (196 lb)	347 cm (137 in)	338 cm (133 in)	(China) Jiangsu
8	Yang Tianyuan	28 June 1994	1.80 m (5 ft 11 in)	80 kg (180 lb)	330 cm (130 in)	320 cm (130 in)	(China) Jiangsu
9	Li Yongzhen	7 August 1998	2.00 m (6 ft 7 in)	85 kg (187 lb)	345 cm (136 in)	340 cm (130 in)	(China) Zhejiang Lottery
10	Liu Meng	11 February 1995	1.95 m (6 ft 5 in)	80 kg (180 lb)	340 cm (130 in)	330 cm (130 in)	(China) Shandong Sports
11	Jiang Zhengyang	25 August 1998	2.02 m (6 ft 8 in)	92 kg (203 lb)	345 cm (136 in)	340 cm (130 in)	(China) Henan
15	Peng Shikun	26 August 2000	2.08 m (6 ft 10 in)	90 kg (200 lb)	340 cm (130 in)	330 cm (130 in)	(China) Sichuan Jinlang
16	Zhang Guanhua	10 July 1997	2.02 m (6 ft 8 in)	85 kg (187 lb)	348 cm (137 in)	345 cm (136 in)	(China) Zhejiang Lottery
18	Yuan Dangyi	30 November 1996	2.00 m (6 ft 7 in)	91 kg (201 lb)	355 cm (140 in)	345 cm (136 in)	(China) Tianjin
21	Miao Ruantong	21 April 1995	2.05 m (6 ft 9 in)	88 kg (194 lb)	354 cm (139 in)	345 cm (136 in)	(China) Hubei
22	Zhang Jingyin	20 December 1999	2.07 m (6 ft 9 in)	88 kg (194 lb)	357 cm (141 in)	325 cm (128 in)	(China) Zhejiang Lottery

=== Uzbekistan ===
The following is the Uzbekistani roster in the 2021 Asian Men's Volleyball Championship.

Head Coach: (Uzbekistan) Zokir Nosirov

No.	Name	Date of birth	Height	Weight	Spike	Block	2020–21 club
1	Egamkulov Bunyod	22 February 1988	1.95 m (6 ft 5 in)	83 kg (183 lb)	330 cm (130 in)	310 cm (120 in)	—N/a
3	Yuldashev Umidjon	25 December 1998	1.90 m (6 ft 3 in)	80 kg (180 lb)	340 cm (130 in)	330 cm (130 in)	—N/a
4	Sobirov Islomjon	7 February 1995	2.00 m (6 ft 7 in)	79 kg (174 lb)	363 cm (143 in)	358 cm (141 in)	—N/a
6	Akhtamov Sanjar	28 July 1999	1.96 m (6 ft 5 in)	90 kg (200 lb)	345 cm (136 in)	330 cm (130 in)	—N/a
7	Sobirov Akhrorjon (c)	6 April 1990	2.09 m (6 ft 10 in)	95 kg (209 lb)	362 cm (143 in)	340 cm (130 in)	—N/a
8	Isamov Khabibullokhon	18 January 1999	1.88 m (6 ft 2 in)	75 kg (165 lb)	320 cm (130 in)	300 cm (120 in)	—N/a
10	Kuchkorov Azizbek	16 December 1999	2.00 m (6 ft 7 in)	90 kg (200 lb)	340 cm (130 in)	320 cm (130 in)	—N/a
13	Tamirov Shokhrukh	14 February 2002	1.85 m (6 ft 1 in)	75 kg (165 lb)	260 cm (100 in)	245 cm (96 in)	—N/a
14	Kabuljonov Mukhammadkobuljon	3 April 1999	1.95 m (6 ft 5 in)	88 kg (194 lb)	335 cm (132 in)	315 cm (124 in)	—N/a
19	Murodillaev Jakhongir	21 February 1999	1.90 m (6 ft 3 in)	78 kg (172 lb)	330 cm (130 in)	310 cm (120 in)	—N/a
20	Shukurov Fidavs	20 September 1999	1.93 m (6 ft 4 in)	80 kg (180 lb)	340 cm (130 in)	310 cm (120 in)	—N/a

=== Kuwait ===
The following is the Kuwaiti roster in the 2021 Asian Men's Volleyball Championship.

Head Coach: (Kuwait) Aleksandar Senicic

No.	Name	Date of birth	Height	Weight	Spike	Block	2020–21 club
1	Abdullah Mansour (c)	18 August 1982	1.95 m (6 ft 5 in)	84 kg (185 lb)	342 cm (135 in)	333 cm (131 in)	—N/a
2	Abdulaziz Najum Mahmoud	25 February 1996	1.95 m (6 ft 5 in)	95 kg (209 lb)	342 cm (135 in)	333 cm (131 in)	—N/a
4	Athbi Malek Alenezi	10 February 1997	1.93 m (6 ft 4 in)	81 kg (179 lb)	320 cm (130 in)	320 cm (130 in)	—N/a
5	Bader Abdullah Salim	17 November 1994	1.92 m (6 ft 4 in)	80 kg (180 lb)	338 cm (133 in)	320 cm (130 in)	—N/a
7	Amer Alsalim	13 January 1984	1.97 m (6 ft 6 in)	86 kg (190 lb)	342 cm (135 in)	333 cm (131 in)	—N/a
8	Abdulaziz Shakir Saleem	28 November 1998	1.70 m (5 ft 7 in)	63 kg (139 lb)	—N/a	—N/a	—N/a
9	Meshal Alomar	29 June 1989	1.96 m (6 ft 5 in)	91 kg (201 lb)	335 cm (132 in)	325 cm (128 in)	—N/a
10	Abdulrahman Yousif Almutawa	14 February 1995	1.92 m (6 ft 4 in)	85 kg (187 lb)	340 cm (130 in)	330 cm (130 in)	—N/a
12	Hussain Faisal Almesri	25 June 1994	1.93 m (6 ft 4 in)	84 kg (185 lb)	333 cm (131 in)	320 cm (130 in)	—N/a
14	Abdulnaser Alanzi	31 July 1988	1.91 m (6 ft 3 in)	80 kg (180 lb)	325 cm (128 in)	325 cm (128 in)	—N/a
17	Rashed Saleh Anbar	14 August 1997	1.91 m (6 ft 3 in)	70 kg (150 lb)	345 cm (136 in)	335 cm (132 in)	—N/a
18	Naser Ali	13 February 1988	1.85 m (6 ft 1 in)	81 kg (179 lb)	—N/a	—N/a	—N/a

== Pool D ==
=== South Korea ===
The following is the Korean roster in the 2021 Asian Men's Volleyball Championship.

Head Coach: (South Korea) Park Sam-ryong

No.	Name	Date of birth	Height	Weight	Spike	Block	2020–21 club
1	Kim Ji-han	16 September 1999	1.94 m (6 ft 4 in)	80 kg (180 lb)	—N/a	—N/a	(South Korea) Sangmu
3	Lee Min-wook	10 February 1995	1.82 m (6 ft 0 in)	79 kg (174 lb)	—N/a	—N/a	(South Korea) Sangmu
4	Hwang Young-kwon (c)	10 May 1993	1.71 m (5 ft 7 in)	63 kg (139 lb)	—N/a	—N/a	(South Korea) Sangmu
5	Lee Ji-yul	28 April 1998	1.79 m (5 ft 10 in)	73 kg (161 lb)	—N/a	—N/a	(South Korea) Sangmu
6	Choi Ik-je	12 January 1999	1.89 m (6 ft 2 in)	79 kg (174 lb)	—N/a	—N/a	(South Korea) Sangmu
7	Jeong Seong-hwan	23 February 1996	1.96 m (6 ft 5 in)	84 kg (185 lb)	—N/a	—N/a	(South Korea) Sangmu
8	Ham Dong-jun	20 May 2002	1.95 m (6 ft 5 in)	93 kg (205 lb)	—N/a	—N/a	(South Korea) Sangmu
9	Kim Dong-min	27 December 1997	1.91 m (6 ft 3 in)	76 kg (168 lb)	—N/a	—N/a	(South Korea) Sangmu
10	Jueng Tae-hyun	8 May 1997	1.92 m (6 ft 4 in)	87 kg (192 lb)	—N/a	—N/a	(South Korea) Sangmu
13	Cheon Jong-beom	18 December 1993	2.10 m (6 ft 11 in)	103 kg (227 lb)	—N/a	—N/a	(South Korea) Sangmu
14	Geum Tae-yong	11 June 1996	1.87 m (6 ft 2 in)	80 kg (180 lb)	—N/a	—N/a	(South Korea) Sangmu
15	Han Kuk-min	29 December 1997	1.94 m (6 ft 4 in)	88 kg (194 lb)	—N/a	—N/a	(South Korea) Sangmu
16	Lee Won-jung	6 April 1995	1.87 m (6 ft 2 in)	76 kg (168 lb)	—N/a	—N/a	(South Korea) Sangmu
17	Lee Si-woo	7 April 1994	1.88 m (6 ft 2 in)	80 kg (180 lb)	—N/a	—N/a	(South Korea) Sangmu

=== Chinese Taipei ===
The following is the Chinese Taipei roster in the 2021 Asian Men's Volleyball Championship.

Head Coach: (Serbia) Moro Branislav

No.	Name	Date of birth	Height	Weight	Spike	Block	2020–21 club
2	Yun-Liang Jhang	28 August 1998	1.67 m (5 ft 6 in)	76 kg (168 lb)	270 cm (110 in)	270 cm (110 in)	—N/a
3	Chia-Hsuan Li	6 September 1993	1.73 m (5 ft 8 in)	73 kg (161 lb)	300 cm (120 in)	300 cm (120 in)	—N/a
6	Ju-Chien Tai (c)	14 November 1988	1.82 m (6 ft 0 in)	85 kg (187 lb)	315 cm (124 in)	310 cm (120 in)	—N/a
7	Hung-Min Liu	10 November 1993	1.91 m (6 ft 3 in)	88 kg (194 lb)	340 cm (130 in)	330 cm (130 in)	—N/a
8	No Lei	29 October 2002	1.94 m (6 ft 4 in)	85 kg (187 lb)	310 cm (120 in)	300 cm (120 in)	—N/a
9	Wei-Cheng Kao	29 October 1995	1.83 m (6 ft 0 in)	70 kg (150 lb)	325 cm (128 in)	310 cm (120 in)	—N/a
11	Tsung-Hsuan Wu	9 July 1994	1.87 m (6 ft 2 in)	85 kg (187 lb)	325 cm (128 in)	310 cm (120 in)	—N/a
12	Po-Ting Sung	2 September 1998	1.86 m (6 ft 1 in)	78 kg (172 lb)	285 cm (112 in)	280 cm (110 in)	—N/a
14	Yu-Sheng Chang	30 March 2000	1.88 m (6 ft 2 in)	85 kg (187 lb)	310 cm (120 in)	310 cm (120 in)	—N/a
15	Min-Han Chan	18 May 1997	1.91 m (6 ft 3 in)	90 kg (200 lb)	300 cm (120 in)	300 cm (120 in)	—N/a
16	Chen-Fu Yen	28 October 1997	1.98 m (6 ft 6 in)	92 kg (203 lb)	330 cm (130 in)	325 cm (128 in)	—N/a
17	Chia-Chang Liu	2 October 1999	1.83 m (6 ft 0 in)	66 kg (146 lb)	295 cm (116 in)	290 cm (110 in)	—N/a
19	Yi-Huei Lin	19 February 1997	1.96 m (6 ft 5 in)	88 kg (194 lb)	340 cm (130 in)	330 cm (130 in)	—N/a
20	Pei-Chang Tsai	2 January 2001	2.00 m (6 ft 7 in)	90 kg (200 lb)	330 cm (130 in)	320 cm (130 in)	—N/a

=== Kazakhstan ===
The following is the Kazakhstani roster in the 2021 Asian Men's Volleyball Championship.

Head Coach: (France) (Russia) Boris Grebennikov

No.	Name	Date of birth	Height	Weight	Spike	Block	2020–21 club
2	Denis Yexhshenko	31 January 1997	2.02 m (6 ft 8 in)	84 kg (185 lb)	345 cm (136 in)	330 cm (130 in)	(Kazakhstan) Taraz VC
3	Vladimir Prokofyev	9 February 1993	2.03 m (6 ft 8 in)	94 kg (207 lb)	345 cm (136 in)	330 cm (130 in)	(Kazakhstan) Altay VC
4	Yerikzhan Boken	31 July 1996	1.85 m (6 ft 1 in)	82 kg (181 lb)	326 cm (128 in)	316 cm (124 in)	(Kazakhstan) Taraz VC
5	Sergey Kuznetsov	26 October 1993	1.97 m (6 ft 6 in)	89 kg (196 lb)	330 cm (130 in)	315 cm (124 in)	(Kazakhstan) Burevestnik
9	Sergey Okunev	29 April 1990	1.83 m (6 ft 0 in)	84 kg (185 lb)	—N/a	—N/a	—N/a
11	Damir Akimov	22 September 1991	2.02 m (6 ft 8 in)	100 kg (220 lb)	360 cm (140 in)	330 cm (130 in)	(Kazakhstan) Altay VC
12	Nodirkhan Kadirkhanov	6 September 1991	2.03 m (6 ft 8 in)	85 kg (187 lb)	340 cm (130 in)	330 cm (130 in)	(Kazakhstan) Altay VC
13	Vladislav Kunchenko	13 January 1998	1.89 m (6 ft 2 in)	79 kg (174 lb)	335 cm (132 in)	325 cm (128 in)	(Kazakhstan) Kaznau Almaty
14	Aibat Netalin	30 March 1992	1.95 m (6 ft 5 in)	96 kg (212 lb)	350 cm (140 in)	340 cm (130 in)	(Kazakhstan) Atyrau VC
18	Vitaliy Vorivodin (c)	31 July 1990	1.94 m (6 ft 4 in)	101 kg (223 lb)	347 cm (137 in)	330 cm (130 in)	(Kazakhstan) Atyrau VC
19	Alexandr Shvartskopf	30 September 1998	2.02 m (6 ft 8 in)	80 kg (180 lb)	340 cm (130 in)	330 cm (130 in)	(Kazakhstan) Taraz VC
21	Nurlibek Nurmakhambetov	17 July 2000	1.96 m (6 ft 5 in)	74 kg (163 lb)	315 cm (124 in)	310 cm (120 in)	(Kazakhstan) Taraz VC
22	Sergey Rezanov	22 November 1994	1.96 m (6 ft 5 in)	86 kg (190 lb)	354 cm (139 in)	330 cm (130 in)	(Kazakhstan) Ushkyn-Iskra
23	Alexandr Suleimanov	30 April 1997	1.93 m (6 ft 4 in)	83 kg (183 lb)	320 cm (130 in)	310 cm (120 in)	(Kazakhstan) Altay

=== Saudi Arabia ===
The following is the Saudi Arabian roster in the 2021 Asian Men's Volleyball Championship.

Head Coach: (Serbia) Vladan Avramovic

No.	Name	Date of birth	Height	Weight	Spike	Block	2020–21 club
1	Osamah Alzahrani	31 December 1997	—N/a	—N/a	—N/a	—N/a	—N/a
2	Nawaf Albakheet	31 August 1987	—N/a	—N/a	—N/a	—N/a	—N/a
3	Waleed Alotaibi	13 February 2000	—N/a	—N/a	—N/a	—N/a	—N/a
4	Hassan Wathlan	10 May 1995	—N/a	—N/a	—N/a	—N/a	—N/a
5	Abdullah Alzahrani	18 June 1995	—N/a	—N/a	—N/a	—N/a	—N/a
6	Asaad Azouz (c)	11 April 1988	—N/a	—N/a	—N/a	—N/a	—N/a
8	Mazen Almuwallad	15 March 2000	—N/a	—N/a	—N/a	—N/a	—N/a
9	Hussain Almureet	25 April 1995	—N/a	—N/a	—N/a	—N/a	—N/a
10	Ibrahim Almoaiqel	4 July 1996	—N/a	—N/a	—N/a	—N/a	—N/a
11	Aedh Aldawsari	2 July 1997	—N/a	—N/a	—N/a	—N/a	—N/a
12	Muwaffaq Almutairi	30 September 1990	—N/a	—N/a	—N/a	—N/a	—N/a
13	Omar Alnajrani	13 July 1990	—N/a	—N/a	—N/a	—N/a	—N/a
14	Bader Bin Suaydan	10 October 1992	—N/a	—N/a	—N/a	—N/a	—N/a
18	Wesam Algihani	25 January 1997	—N/a	—N/a	—N/a	—N/a	—N/a
