= 2019 Asian Men's Volleyball Championship squads =

This article shows the rosters of all participating teams at the 2019 Asian Championship in Iran.

== Pool A ==
=== Australia ===
The following is the Australian roster in the 2019 Asian Men's Volleyball Championship.

Head Coach: Mark Lebedew

No.	Name	Date of birth	Height	Weight	Spike	Block	2019 club
1	Beau Graham	17 April 1994	2.02 m (6 ft 8 in)	86 kg (190 lb)	351 cm (138 in)	332 cm (131 in)	(Australia) VK Pribram (CZE)
2	Arshdeep Dosanjh	30 July 1996	2.05 m (6 ft 9 in)	85 kg (187 lb)	347 cm (137 in)	335 cm (132 in)	(Australia) Aluron Warta Zawiercie (POL)
4	Paul Sanderson	7 January 1986	1.95 m (6 ft 5 in)	94 kg (207 lb)	348 cm (137 in)	335 cm (132 in)	(Australia) Arcadia Galati (ROM)
6	Thomas Edgar	21 June 1989	2.12 m (6 ft 11 in)	106 kg (234 lb)	357 cm (141 in)	341 cm (134 in)	(Australia) JT Thunders (JAP)
8	Trent O'Dea	11 May 1994	2.01 m (6 ft 7 in)	98 kg (216 lb)	354 cm (139 in)	344 cm (135 in)	(Australia) Karlovarsko (CZE)
9	Max Staples (c)	27 July 1994	1.94 m (6 ft 4 in)	83 kg (183 lb)	358 cm (141 in)	345 cm (136 in)	(Australia) Ceske Budejovice (CZE)
10	Jordan Richards	25 September 1993	1.93 m (6 ft 4 in)	80 kg (180 lb)	354 cm (139 in)	342 cm (135 in)	(Australia) Sporting Clube de Portugal (POR)
11	Luke Perry	20 November 1995	1.8 m (5 ft 11 in)	75 kg (165 lb)	331 cm (130 in)	315 cm (124 in)	(Australia) Asseco Resovia Rzeszów (POL)
12	Nehemiah Mote	21 June 1993	2.04 m (6 ft 8 in)	91 kg (201 lb)	362 cm (143 in)	354 cm (139 in)	(Australia) VA Centre of Excellence (AUS)
13	Samuel Walker	19 February 1995	2.08 m (6 ft 10 in)	90 kg (200 lb)	350 cm (140 in)	337 cm (133 in)	(Australia) Bigbank Tartu (EST)
15	Luke Smith	30 August 1990	2.04 m (6 ft 8 in)	95 kg (209 lb)	360 cm (140 in)	342 cm (135 in)	(Australia) Cuprum Lubin (POL)
18	Lincoln Alexander Williams	6 October 1993	2 m (6 ft 7 in)	104 kg (229 lb)	353 cm (139 in)	330 cm (130 in)	(Australia) Nizhnevartovsk (RUS)
21	Nicholas Butler	27 June 1997	1.98 m (6 ft 6 in)	95 kg (209 lb)	345 cm (136 in)	333 cm (131 in)	(Australia) Beauvais (FRA)
23	James Weir	20 July 1995	2.04 m (6 ft 8 in)	95 kg (209 lb)	348 cm (137 in)	342 cm (135 in)	(Australia) University of Brandon (CAN)

=== Iran ===
The following is the Iranian roster in the 2019 Asian Men's Volleyball Championship.

Head Coach: Igor Kolaković

No.	Name	Date of birth	Height	Weight	Spike	Block	2019 club
2	Milad Ebadipour	17 October 1993	1.96 m (6 ft 5 in)	78 kg (172 lb)	350 cm (140 in)	310 cm (120 in)	(Poland) PGE Skra Belchatow
4	Saeid Marouf	20 October 1985	1.89 m (6 ft 2 in)	81 kg (179 lb)	331 cm (130 in)	311 cm (122 in)	(Italy) Emma Villas Siena
5	Farhad Ghaemi	28 August 1989	1.97 m (6 ft 6 in)	73 kg (161 lb)	355 cm (140 in)	335 cm (132 in)	(Turkey) Ziraat Bankası Ankara
6	Mohammad Mousavi	22 August 1987	2.03 m (6 ft 8 in)	86 kg (190 lb)	362 cm (143 in)	344 cm (135 in)	(Iran) Payam Mashhad
7	Pouria Fayazi	12 January 1993	1.95 m (6 ft 5 in)	92 kg (203 lb)	335 cm (132 in)	325 cm (128 in)	(Iran) Shahrdari Varamin
8	Mohammad Reza Hazratpour	31 March 1999	1.87 m (6 ft 2 in)	87 kg (192 lb)	300 cm (120 in)	290 cm (110 in)	(Iran) Saipa Tehran
9	Masoud Gholami	2 April 1990	2.04 m (6 ft 8 in)	93 kg (205 lb)	349 cm (137 in)	331 cm (130 in)	(Iran) Shahrdari Varamin
10	Amir Ghafour	6 June 1991	2.02 m (6 ft 8 in)	90 kg (200 lb)	354 cm (139 in)	334 cm (131 in)	(Italy) Vero Volley Monza
15	Ali Asghar Mojarrad	30 October 1997	2.05 m (6 ft 9 in)	90 kg (200 lb)	330 cm (130 in)	310 cm (120 in)	(Iran) Shahrdari Varamin
16	Ali Shafiei	21 September 1991	1.98 m (6 ft 6 in)	80 kg (180 lb)	348 cm (137 in)	345 cm (136 in)	(Iran) Saipa Tehran
19	Mohammad Reza Moazzen	20 September 1991	1.75 m (5 ft 9 in)	75 kg (165 lb)	292 cm (115 in)	281 cm (111 in)	(Iran) Shahrdari Tabriz
20	Porya Yali	21 January 1999	2.09 m (6 ft 10 in)	81 kg (179 lb)	335 cm (132 in)	320 cm (130 in)	(Iran) Paykan Tehran
22	Amir Hossein Esfandiar	24 January 1999	2.09 m (6 ft 10 in)	110 kg (240 lb)	330 cm (130 in)	310 cm (120 in)	(Iran) Paykan Tehran
24	Javad Karimi	1 March 1998	2.04 m (6 ft 8 in)	104 kg (229 lb)	330 cm (130 in)	310 cm (120 in)	(Iran) Paykan Tehran

=== Sri Lanka ===
The following is the Sri Lankan roster in the 2019 Asian Men's Volleyball Championship.

Head Coach: Manuel Torres Torres Gonzalo

No.	Name	Date of birth	Height	Weight	Spike	Block	2019 club
1	Munipurage Malith Dinindu Chamara	19 February 1992	1.9 m (6 ft 3 in)	70 kg (150 lb)	326 cm (128 in)	307 cm (121 in)	(Sri Lanka) N/A
3	Ayesh Perera	1 May 1996	1.98 m (6 ft 6 in)	89 kg (196 lb)	338 cm (133 in)	317 cm (125 in)	(Sri Lanka) N/A
4	Lasindu Wasanthapriya	17 November 1994	1.94 m (6 ft 4 in)	88 kg (194 lb)	335 cm (132 in)	312 cm (123 in)	(Sri Lanka) N/A
5	Muthuwadige Danushka Dils Fernando	24 February 1995	1.83 m (6 ft 0 in)	70 kg (150 lb)	295 cm (116 in)	279 cm (110 in)	(Sri Lanka) N/A
8	Bh Wasantha Lakmal Lakmal	16 October 1992	1.97 m (6 ft 6 in)	97 kg (214 lb)	322 cm (127 in)	395 cm (156 in)	(Sri Lanka) student
9	Kelaniyage Shashika Laksha Kelaniyage	14 June 1995	1.9 m (6 ft 3 in)	82 kg (181 lb)	333 cm (131 in)	326 cm (128 in)	(Sri Lanka) N/A
10	Aw Lakmal Lakmal	13 March 1991	1.66 m (5 ft 5 in)	81 kg (179 lb)	270 cm (110 in)	263 cm (104 in)	(Sri Lanka) student
12	Kasun Chathuranga Fernando	25 October 1986	1.73 m (5 ft 8 in)	80 kg (180 lb)	288 cm (113 in)	276 cm (109 in)	(Sri Lanka) N/A
13	Panadura Acharige Nishan M Perera	1 May 1996	1.96 m (6 ft 5 in)	74 kg (163 lb)	331 cm (130 in)	326 cm (128 in)	(Sri Lanka) N/A
15	Mahesh Chandraumara	10 September 1993	1.8 m (5 ft 11 in)	70 kg (150 lb)	308 cm (121 in)	330 cm (130 in)	(Sri Lanka) N/A
16	Siddihaluge Isuru Madushan	15 May 1996	1.82 m (6 ft 0 in)	63 kg (139 lb)	328 cm (129 in)	321 cm (126 in)	(Sri Lanka) N/A
17	Shehan Sagara	28 November 1994	1.75 m (5 ft 9 in)	73 kg (161 lb)	279 cm (110 in)	270 cm (110 in)	(Sri Lanka) N/A
18	Hpd Romesh Ranawaka Ranawaka	22 January 1992	1.89 m (6 ft 2 in)	91 kg (201 lb)	333 cm (131 in)	307 cm (121 in)	(Sri Lanka) student
19	MAHELA INDEEWARA BANDARA	8 June 2000	1.86 m (6 ft 1 in)	55 kg (121 lb)	300 cm (120 in)	290 cm (110 in)	(Sri Lanka) N/A

=== Qatar ===
The following is the Qatari roster in the 2019 Asian Men's Volleyball Championship.

Head Coach: Camilo Soto

No.	Name	Date of birth	Height	Weight	Spike	Block	2019 club
3	Assam Ahmed Mahmoud	20 February 1987	1.9 m (6 ft 3 in)	85 kg (187 lb)	330 cm (130 in)	310 cm (120 in)	(Qatar) Al Ahli S.C.
4	Ribeiro Renan	30 December 1989	1.9 m (6 ft 3 in)	80 kg (180 lb)	330 cm (130 in)	320 cm (130 in)	(Qatar) ALARABI S.C.
5	Saad Sulaiman Sulaiman	30 June 1987	1.8 m (5 ft 11 in)	85 kg (187 lb)	270 cm (110 in)	255 cm (100 in)	(Qatar) Al-Rayyan Sports Club
7	Belal Abunabot	1 January 1991	2 m (6 ft 7 in)	90 kg (200 lb)	340 cm (130 in)	330 cm (130 in)	(Qatar) ALRAYYAN S.C.
8	Naji Mahmoud Naji	16 December 1994	1.75 m (5 ft 9 in)	85 kg (187 lb)	290 cm (110 in)	270 cm (110 in)	(Qatar) POILCEA.C.
9	Milos Stevanovic	27 September 1988	1.9 m (6 ft 3 in)	90 kg (200 lb)	315 cm (124 in)	305 cm (120 in)	(Qatar) ALJAISH S.C.
10	Nadir Ababacar Sadikh	2 February 1986	1.95 m (6 ft 5 in)	90 kg (200 lb)	340 cm (130 in)	320 cm (130 in)	(Qatar) Police S.C.
11	Nikola Vasic	4 June 1989	1.9 m (6 ft 3 in)	70 kg (150 lb)	310 cm (120 in)	300 cm (120 in)	(Qatar) ALWAKRA S.C.
12	Mubarak Dahi Waleed	1 April 1991	2 m (6 ft 7 in)	85 kg (187 lb)	345 cm (136 in)	330 cm (130 in)	(Qatar) ALRAYYAN S.C
13	Abdulwahid Wagihalla Osman	1 January 1993	1.95 m (6 ft 5 in)	90 kg (200 lb)	320 cm (130 in)	300 cm (120 in)	Qatar S.C.
15	Mahdi Badreddin Sammoud	22 March 1991	1.9 m (6 ft 3 in)	80 kg (180 lb)	330 cm (130 in)	310 cm (120 in)	(Qatar) C.O.KELIBIA
16	Ibrahim Ibrahim (volleyball)	15 January 1985	2.05 m (6 ft 9 in)	80 kg (180 lb)	360 cm (140 in)	305 cm (120 in)	(Qatar) ALARABI S.C.
17	Ahmed Noaman	8 February 1994	2.02 m (6 ft 8 in)	85 kg (187 lb)	330 cm (130 in)	310 cm (120 in)	(Qatar) Al Shamal S.C.

== Pool B ==
=== Chinese Taipei ===
The following is the Chinese Taipei roster in the 2019 Asian Men's Volleyball Championship.

Head Coach: Branislav Moro

No.	Name	Date of birth	Height	Weight	Spike	Block	2019 club
1	Min-Han Chan	18 May 1997	1.91 m (6 ft 3 in)	90 kg (200 lb)	300 cm (120 in)	300 cm (120 in)	(Chinese Taipei) Taiwan Power
2	Hung-Min Liu	10 November 1993	1.9 m (6 ft 3 in)	88 kg (194 lb)	342 cm (135 in)	330 cm (130 in)	(Thailand) Diamond Food
4	Yi-Huei Lin	19 February 1997	1.96 m (6 ft 5 in)	88 kg (194 lb)	340 cm (130 in)	339 cm (133 in)	(Chinese Taipei) Taiwan Power
6	Ju-Chien Tai ©	14 November 1988	1.82 m (6 ft 0 in)	85 kg (187 lb)	315 cm (124 in)	310 cm (120 in)	(Chinese Taipei) Taiwan Power
7	Hong-Jie Liu	10 November 1993	1.91 m (6 ft 3 in)	88 kg (194 lb)	340 cm (130 in)	330 cm (130 in)	(Thailand) Diamond Food
9	Wei-Cheng Kao	29 October 1995	1.83 m (6 ft 0 in)	70 kg (150 lb)	325 cm (128 in)	310 cm (120 in)	(Chinese Taipei) Mizuno
10	Yu-Sheng Chang	30 March 2000	1.88 m (6 ft 2 in)	85 kg (187 lb)	310 cm (120 in)	310 cm (120 in)	(Chinese Taipei) Taiwan Power
11	Tsung-Hsuan Wu	9 July 1994	1.87 m (6 ft 2 in)	85 kg (187 lb)	325 cm (128 in)	310 cm (120 in)	(Chinese Taipei) Mizuno
12	Yun-Liang Jhang	28 August 1998	1.67 m (5 ft 6 in)	76 kg (168 lb)	270 cm (110 in)	270 cm (110 in)	(Chinese Taipei) Conti
14	Ming Chun Wang	30 July 1988	1.95 m (6 ft 5 in)	90 kg (200 lb)	325 cm (128 in)	320 cm (130 in)	(Chinese Taipei) Taiwan Power
15	Hsiu-Chih Shih	24 July 1995	1.85 m (6 ft 1 in)	77 kg (170 lb)	300 cm (120 in)	295 cm (116 in)	(Chinese Taipei) Conti
16	Chen Fu Yen	28 October 1997	1.98 m (6 ft 6 in)	92 kg (203 lb)	330 cm (130 in)	325 cm (128 in)	(Chinese Taipei) Taiwan Power
19	Chien Chen Chen	20 November 1989	1.89 m (6 ft 2 in)	92 kg (203 lb)	330 cm (130 in)	325 cm (128 in)	(Japan) Panasonic Panthers
20	Hou-Chen Su	14 September 1995	1.8 m (5 ft 11 in)	86 kg (190 lb)	300 cm (120 in)	300 cm (120 in)	(Chinese Taipei) Mizuno

=== Hong Kong ===
The following is the Hong Kong roster in the 2019 Asian Men's Volleyball Championship.

Head Coach: Hok Chun Yau

No.	Name	Date of birth	Height	Weight	Spike	Block	2019 club
1	Wing Chun Wong	9 April 1994	1.93 m (6 ft 4 in)	90 kg (200 lb)	312 cm (123 in)	311 cm (122 in)	(Hong Kong) Dragon
2	Chin To Au	13 February 1996	1.87 m (6 ft 2 in)	87 kg (192 lb)	321 cm (126 in)	304 cm (120 in)	(Hong Kong) Ling Yat
3	Chi Wing Lau	23 March 1996	1.76 m (5 ft 9 in)	70 kg (150 lb)	323 cm (127 in)	304 cm (120 in)	(Hong Kong) Aspiring
4	Ho Yin Leung	26 September 1998	1.79 m (5 ft 10 in)	80 kg (180 lb)	318 cm (125 in)	293 cm (115 in)	(Hong Kong) Dragon
6	Cheuk Hin Lam	30 August 1994	1.85 m (6 ft 1 in)	83 kg (183 lb)	320 cm (130 in)	310 cm (120 in)	(Hong Kong) Wing Fai
7	Chun Hin So	12 July 1996	1.79 m (5 ft 10 in)	80 kg (180 lb)	329 cm (130 in)	316 cm (124 in)	(Hong Kong) Lo Kon Ting
8	Pak Fai Chow	19 April 1996	1.75 m (5 ft 9 in)	68 kg (150 lb)	310 cm (120 in)	294 cm (116 in)	(Hong Kong) Yan Chai
9	Wai Sze Chung	4 September 1991	1.85 m (6 ft 1 in)	80 kg (180 lb)	296 cm (117 in)	306 cm (120 in)	(Hong Kong) Dragon
11	Cheong Hung Siu (c)	26 January 1993	1.9 m (6 ft 3 in)	80 kg (180 lb)	330 cm (130 in)	320 cm (130 in)	(Hong Kong) Dragon
14	Edmond Ka Tsun Chiu	4 February 1996	1.73 m (5 ft 8 in)	68 kg (150 lb)	292 cm (115 in)	280 cm (110 in)	(Hong Kong) Dragon
16	Chi Leung Poon	30 January 1997	1.88 m (6 ft 2 in)	80 kg (180 lb)	329 cm (130 in)	305 cm (120 in)	(Hong Kong) Aspiring
18	Tsz Ching Yau	19 June 1994	1.93 m (6 ft 4 in)	85 kg (187 lb)	333 cm (131 in)	310 cm (120 in)	(Hong Kong) Dragon
19	Pui Lam Wong	28 July 1991	1.79 m (5 ft 10 in)	68 kg (150 lb)	312 cm (123 in)	298 cm (117 in)	(Hong Kong) Yan Chai
20	Chun Hin Man	24 October 1995	1.79 m (5 ft 10 in)	90 kg (200 lb)	322 cm (127 in)	310 cm (120 in)	(Hong Kong) Lo Kon Ting

=== Japan ===
The following is the Japanese roster in the 2019 Asian Men's Volleyball Championship.

Head Coach: Yuichi Nakagaichi

No.	Name	Date of birth	Height	Weight	Spike	Block	2019 club
3	Naonobu Fujii	5 January 1992	1.83 m (6 ft 0 in)	78 kg (172 lb)	312 cm (123 in)	297 cm (117 in)	(Japan) Toray Arrows
4	Kunihiro Shimizu	11 August 1986	1.93 m (6 ft 4 in)	97 kg (214 lb)	330 cm (130 in)	320 cm (130 in)	(Japan) Panasonic Panthers
5	Tatsuya Fukuzawa	1 July 1986	1.89 m (6 ft 2 in)	88 kg (194 lb)	355 cm (140 in)	330 cm (130 in)	(Japan) Panasonic Panthers
6	Akihiro Yamauchi	30 November 1993	2.04 m (6 ft 8 in)	80 kg (180 lb)	353 cm (139 in)	335 cm (132 in)	(Japan) Panasonic Panthers
8	Masahiro Yanagida	6 July 1992	1.86 m (6 ft 1 in)	79 kg (174 lb)	328 cm (129 in)	301 cm (119 in)	(Japan) United Volleys
10	Taichiro Koga	4 October 1989	1.7 m (5 ft 7 in)	70 kg (150 lb)	292 cm (115 in)	277 cm (109 in)	(Japan) Wolfdogs Nagoya
11	Yūji Nishida	30 January 2000	1.86 m (6 ft 1 in)	80 kg (180 lb)	346 cm (136 in)	330 cm (130 in)	(Japan) JTEKT Stings
12	Masahiro Sekita	20 November 1993	1.75 m (5 ft 9 in)	72 kg (159 lb)	311 cm (122 in)	295 cm (116 in)	(Japan) Sakai Blazers
13	Naoya Takano	30 April 1993	1.9 m (6 ft 3 in)	78 kg (172 lb)	338 cm (133 in)	316 cm (124 in)	(Japan) Sakai Blazers
14	Yūki Ishikawa	11 December 1995	1.91 m (6 ft 3 in)	84 kg (185 lb)	351 cm (138 in)	327 cm (129 in)	(Japan) Kioene Padova
15	Haku Ri	27 December 1990	1.93 m (6 ft 4 in)	82 kg (181 lb)	344 cm (135 in)	330 cm (130 in)	(Japan) Toray Arrows
16	Kentaro Takahashi	8 February 1995	2.01 m (6 ft 7 in)	103 kg (227 lb)	351 cm (138 in)	338 cm (133 in)	(Japan) Toray Arrows
18	Tomohiro Yamamoto	5 November 1994	1.71 m (5 ft 7 in)	69 kg (152 lb)	301 cm (119 in)	299 cm (118 in)	(Japan) Sakai Blazers
20	Taishi Onodera	27 February 1996	2.01 m (6 ft 7 in)	98 kg (216 lb)	346 cm (136 in)	323 cm (127 in)	(Japan) JT Thunders

=== Thailand ===
The following is the Thai roster in the 2019 Asian Men's Volleyball Championship.

Head Coach: Monchai Supajirakul

No.	Name	Date of birth	Height	Weight	Spike	Block	2019 club
2	Amorntep Konhan	6 October 1995	1.86 m (6 ft 1 in)	73 kg (161 lb)	300 cm (120 in)	295 cm (116 in)	(Thailand) Phitsanulok
3	Jakkapong Tongklang	1 August 1995	1.73 m (5 ft 8 in)	73 kg (161 lb)	300 cm (120 in)	295 cm (116 in)	(Thailand) Visakha
4	Jakkraphop Saengsee	16 January 1995	1.9 m (6 ft 3 in)	85 kg (187 lb)	340 cm (130 in)	305 cm (120 in)	(Thailand) Air Force
5	Kissada Nilsawai	17 April 1994	2.02 m (6 ft 8 in)	87 kg (192 lb)	350 cm (140 in)	335 cm (132 in)	(Thailand) Diamond Food
6	Kittithad Nuwaddee	25 May 1998	1.87 m (6 ft 2 in)	72 kg (159 lb)	310 cm (120 in)	300 cm (120 in)	(Thailand) Phitsanulok
8	Chakkit Chandahuadong	5 November 1996	1.83 m (6 ft 0 in)	72 kg (159 lb)	310 cm (120 in)	300 cm (120 in)	(Thailand) Nakhon Ratchasima
10	Kittinon Namkhunthod	16 July 1992	1.88 m (6 ft 2 in)	73 kg (161 lb)	320 cm (130 in)	331 cm (130 in)	(Thailand) Nakhon Ratchasima
12	Anuchit Pakdeekaew	29 September 1996	1.92 m (6 ft 4 in)	90 kg (200 lb)	325 cm (128 in)	315 cm (124 in)	(Thailand) Air Force
13	Mawin Maneewong	5 October 1996	1.93 m (6 ft 4 in)	75 kg (165 lb)	325 cm (128 in)	310 cm (120 in)	(Thailand) Air Force
14	Kitsada Somkane (c)	28 September 1990	1.9 m (6 ft 3 in)	77 kg (170 lb)	342 cm (135 in)	312 cm (123 in)	(Thailand) Visakha
15	Anut Promchan	13 June 1997	1.94 m (6 ft 4 in)	72 kg (159 lb)	320 cm (130 in)	310 cm (120 in)	(Thailand) Phitsanulok
16	Kantapat Koonmee	17 April 1998	2.04 m (6 ft 8 in)	81 kg (179 lb)	345 cm (136 in)	355 cm (140 in)	(Thailand) Air Force
18	Montri Puanglib	24 March 1990	1.67 m (5 ft 6 in)	70 kg (150 lb)	311 cm (122 in)	281 cm (111 in)	(Thailand) N/A
21	Boonyarid Wongtorn	29 January 1998	1.82 m (6 ft 0 in)	73 kg (161 lb)	310 cm (120 in)	300 cm (120 in)	(Thailand) Nakhon Ratchasima

== Pool C ==
=== China ===
The following is the Chinese roster in the 2019 Asian Men's Volleyball Championship.

Head Coach: Raul Lozano

No.	Name	Date of birth	Height	Weight	Spike	Block	2019 club
2	Jiang Chuan	9 August 1994	2.05 m (6 ft 9 in)	91 kg (201 lb)	365 cm (144 in)	345 cm (136 in)	(China) Beijing
3	Mao Tianyi	2 June 1993	2 m (6 ft 7 in)	90 kg (200 lb)	350 cm (140 in)	340 cm (130 in)	(China) Bayi
5	Zhang Binglong	11 September 1994	1.97 m (6 ft 6 in)	95 kg (209 lb)	355 cm (140 in)	345 cm (136 in)	(China) Beijing
6	Guo Shunxiang	3 November 1997	1.95 m (6 ft 5 in)	91 kg (201 lb)	349 cm (137 in)	335 cm (132 in)	(China) Sichuan
7	Wang Jingyi	7 February 1998	2.02 m (6 ft 8 in)	87 kg (192 lb)	360 cm (140 in)	350 cm (140 in)	(China) Shandong
8	Tong Jiahua	13 December 1992	1.8 m (5 ft 11 in)	76 kg (168 lb)	330 cm (130 in)	320 cm (130 in)	(China) Shanghai
9	Yu Yaochen	19 August 1995	1.95 m (6 ft 5 in)	89 kg (196 lb)	347 cm (137 in)	338 cm (133 in)	(China) Jiangsu
10	Ji Daoshuai (c)	7 February 1992	1.94 m (6 ft 4 in)	82 kg (181 lb)	355 cm (140 in)	335 cm (132 in)	(China) Shandong
11	Du Haixiang	25 May 1995	1.94 m (6 ft 4 in)	87 kg (192 lb)	348 cm (137 in)	336 cm (132 in)	(China) Sichuan
13	Chen Longhai	29 March 1991	2 m (6 ft 7 in)	85 kg (187 lb)	350 cm (140 in)	340 cm (130 in)	(China) Shanghai
15	Peng Shikun	26 August 2000	2.08 m (6 ft 10 in)	90 kg (200 lb)	340 cm (130 in)	330 cm (130 in)	(China) Sichuan
17	Liu Libin	16 February 1995	1.97 m (6 ft 6 in)	90 kg (200 lb)	350 cm (140 in)	342 cm (135 in)	(China) Beijing
18	Ma Xiaoteng	19 June 1991	1.8 m (5 ft 11 in)	75 kg (165 lb)	330 cm (130 in)	320 cm (130 in)	(China) Bayi
20	Rao Shuhan	23 December 1996	2.05 m (6 ft 9 in)	99 kg (218 lb)	360 cm (140 in)	350 cm (140 in)	(China) Fujian

=== India ===
The following is the Indian roster in the 2019 Asian Men's Volleyball Championship.

Head Coach: Mihailovic Dragan

No.	Name	Date of birth	Height	Weight	Spike	Block	2019 club
1	G K S Ammal Akhin	24 March 1991	2.03 m (6 ft 8 in)	97 kg (214 lb)	362 cm (143 in)	340 cm (130 in)	(India) N/A
2	Amit	25 April 1998	1.94 m (6 ft 4 in)	76 kg (168 lb)	346 cm (136 in)	338 cm (133 in)	(India) N/A
4	Ranjit Singh	19 July 1991	1.92 m (6 ft 4 in)	95 kg (209 lb)	330 cm (130 in)	322 cm (127 in)	(India) N/A
5	Kamlesh Khatik	7 October 1991	1.8 m (5 ft 11 in)	82 kg (181 lb)	310 cm (120 in)	290 cm (110 in)	(India) N/A
6	Pankaj Sharma	8 May 1993	1.94 m (6 ft 4 in)	79 kg (174 lb)	335 cm (132 in)	328 cm (129 in)	(India) N/A
7	Vinit Kumar	25 February 1991	1.96 m (6 ft 5 in)	85 kg (187 lb)	345 cm (136 in)	338 cm (133 in)	(India) N/A
8	Ajithlal Chandran	14 February 1996	1.92 m (6 ft 4 in)	69 kg (152 lb)	345 cm (136 in)	333 cm (131 in)	(India) N/A
9	Sinha Deepesh Kumar	20 May 1993	1.99 m (6 ft 6 in)	91 kg (201 lb)	353 cm (139 in)	326 cm (128 in)	(India) Chhattisgarh
11	Manoj Lakshmipuram Manjunatha	9 June 1997	2.04 m (6 ft 8 in)	94 kg (207 lb)	355 cm (140 in)	345 cm (136 in)	(India) N/A
12	Jerome Vinith Charles	26 June 1992	1.98 m (6 ft 6 in)	95 kg (209 lb)	349 cm (137 in)	340 cm (130 in)	(India) N/A
13	Sinnadhu Prabagaran	3 November 1988	1.94 m (6 ft 4 in)	79 kg (174 lb)	340 cm (130 in)	330 cm (130 in)	(India) N/A
16	Ukkrapandian Mohan (c)	15 May 1986	1.98 m (6 ft 6 in)	89 kg (196 lb)	333 cm (131 in)	325 cm (128 in)	(India) N/A
18	Naveen Raja Jacob Manidurai	24 May 1988	1.85 m (6 ft 1 in)	90 kg (200 lb)	320 cm (130 in)	325 cm (128 in)	(India) Tamilnadu
19	Ashwal Rai	2 February 1993	2 m (6 ft 7 in)	87 kg (192 lb)	360 cm (140 in)	345 cm (136 in)	(India) N/A

=== Kazakhstan ===
The following is the Kazakhstan roster in the 2019 Asian Men's Volleyball Championship.

Head Coach: Igor Nikolchenko

No.	Name	Date of birth	Height	Weight	Spike	Block	2019 club
1	Roman Fartov	2 December 1992	1.84 m (6 ft 0 in)	83 kg (183 lb)	325 cm (128 in)	315 cm (124 in)	(Kazakhstan) Pavlodar VC
3	Dmitriy Vovnenko	17 April 1987	2.12 m (6 ft 11 in)	87 kg (192 lb)	335 cm (132 in)	320 cm (130 in)	(Kazakhstan) Pavlodar
4	Yerikzhan Boken	31 July 1996	1.85 m (6 ft 1 in)	82 kg (181 lb)	326 cm (128 in)	316 cm (124 in)	(Kazakhstan) Taraz
5	Sergey Kuznetsov	26 October 1993	1.97 m (6 ft 6 in)	89 kg (196 lb)	330 cm (130 in)	315 cm (124 in)	(Kazakhstan) Burevestnik
7	Vitaliy Mironenko	18 May 1985	1.87 m (6 ft 2 in)	90 kg (200 lb)	331 cm (130 in)	329 cm (130 in)	(Kazakhstan) Pavlodar
8	Vladimir Prokofyev	9 February 1993	2.03 m (6 ft 8 in)	94 kg (207 lb)	345 cm (136 in)	330 cm (130 in)	(Kazakhstan) Altay
10	Maxim Michshenko	10 September 1990	1.97 m (6 ft 6 in)	94 kg (207 lb)	355 cm (140 in)	315 cm (124 in)	(Kazakhstan) Kazchrome
12	Nodirkhan Kadirkhanov	6 September 1991	2.03 m (6 ft 8 in)	85 kg (187 lb)	340 cm (130 in)	330 cm (130 in)	(Kazakhstan) Altay
14	Aibat Netalin	30 March 1992	1.95 m (6 ft 5 in)	96 kg (212 lb)	350 cm (140 in)	340 cm (130 in)	(Kazakhstan) Atyrau
16	Nurlibek Nurmakhambetov	17 July 2000	1.96 m (6 ft 5 in)	74 kg (163 lb)	315 cm (124 in)	310 cm (120 in)	(Kazakhstan)
17	Mikhail Ustinov	22 December 1989	1.89 m (6 ft 2 in)	79 kg (174 lb)	330 cm (130 in)	323 cm (127 in)	(Kazakhstan) Taraz
18	Vitaliy Vorivodin (c)	31 July 1990	1.94 m (6 ft 4 in)	101 kg (223 lb)	347 cm (137 in)	335 cm (132 in)	(Kazakhstan) Atyrau
19	Sergey Rezanov	22 November 1994	1.96 m (6 ft 5 in)	86 kg (190 lb)	354 cm (139 in)	330 cm (130 in)	(Kazakhstan) Ushkyn-Iskra
23	Alexandr Fomenko	11 December 1998	1.8 m (5 ft 11 in)	69 kg (152 lb)	320 cm (130 in)	315 cm (124 in)	(Kazakhstan) TARAZ

=== Oman ===
The following is the Omani roster in the 2019 Asian Men's Volleyball Championship.

Head Coach: Rashid Al Maqbali

No.	Name	Date of birth	Height	Weight	Spike	Block	2019 club
1	Saud Rashid Salim Al Ma'Mari (c)	31 May 1988	2.08 m (6 ft 10 in)	79 kg (174 lb)	360 cm (140 in)	340 cm (130 in)	(Oman) N/A
2	Khalid AL Makbali	10 July 1988	1.96 m (6 ft 5 in)	78 kg (172 lb)	330 cm (130 in)	320 cm (130 in)	(Oman) N/A
4	Hilal Al-Maqbali	26 February 1984	1.97 m (6 ft 6 in)	80 kg (180 lb)	330 cm (130 in)	320 cm (130 in)	(Oman) SOHAR
5	Adam AlJALABOUBI	1 June 1994	1.88 m (6 ft 2 in)	68 kg (150 lb)	310 cm (120 in)	300 cm (120 in)	(Oman) N/A
7	Ahmed Al Shezawi	22 October 1989	1.85 m (6 ft 1 in)	75 kg (165 lb)	310 cm (120 in)	300 cm (120 in)	(Oman) N/A
8	Majid Al Shezawi	10 October 1981	1.8 m (5 ft 11 in)	80 kg (180 lb)	310 cm (120 in)	290 cm (110 in)	(Oman) SOHAR
9	Ali Al-Maqbali	12 November 1986	1.75 m (5 ft 9 in)	75 kg (165 lb)	300 cm (120 in)	290 cm (110 in)	(Oman) N/A
11	Ismail Al hidi	11 February 1988	1.85 m (6 ft 1 in)	80 kg (180 lb)	330 cm (130 in)	310 cm (120 in)	(Oman) N/A
13	Fallah Al Jaradi	22 April 1994	1.78 m (5 ft 10 in)	78 kg (172 lb)	320 cm (130 in)	310 cm (120 in)	(Oman) N/A
14	Younis Al-Aamri	9 March 1989	1.75 m (5 ft 9 in)	75 kg (165 lb)	320 cm (130 in)	310 cm (120 in)	(Oman) N/A
15	Ibrahim Al Mezeini	29 July 1984	1.78 m (5 ft 10 in)	78 kg (172 lb)	320 cm (130 in)	310 cm (120 in)	(Oman) SAHAM
16	Yousif Rashid Bati Al Shukaili	27 June 1991	1.88 m (6 ft 2 in)	85 kg (187 lb)	320 cm (130 in)	310 cm (120 in)	(Oman) N/A

== Pool D ==
=== Indonesia ===
The following is the Indonesian roster in the 2019 Asian Men's Volleyball Championship.

Head Coach: Li Qiujiang

No.	Name	Date of birth	Height	Weight	Spike	Block	2019 club
1	Rendy Febriant Tamamilang	12 February 1996	1.89 m (6 ft 2 in)	72 kg (159 lb)	330 cm (130 in)	320 cm (130 in)	(Indonesia) N/A
2	Bastian Tamtomo Putra	17 April 1992	1.77 m (5 ft 10 in)	85 kg (187 lb)	300 cm (120 in)	290 cm (110 in)	(Indonesia) N/A
3	Sigit Ardian	1 March 1993	1.87 m (6 ft 2 in)	78 kg (172 lb)	335 cm (132 in)	300 cm (120 in)	(Indonesia) N/A
4	Dimas Saputra Pratama	4 November 1995	1.85 m (6 ft 1 in)	75 kg (165 lb)	315 cm (124 in)	300 cm (120 in)	(Indonesia) N/A
5	Dio Zulfikri	15 December 1996	1.8 m (5 ft 11 in)	78 kg (172 lb)	300 cm (120 in)	285 cm (112 in)	(Indonesia) N/A
6	Muhammad Malizi	29 September 1994	1.87 m (6 ft 2 in)	72 kg (159 lb)	300 cm (120 in)	300 cm (120 in)	(Indonesia) N/A
7	Okky Damar Saputra	15 October 1999	1.89 m (6 ft 2 in)	85 kg (187 lb)	314 cm (124 in)	299 cm (118 in)	(Indonesia) N/A
9	Yuda Mardiansyah Putra		0 m (0 in)	0 kg (0 lb)	0 cm (0 in)	0 cm (0 in)	(Indonesia) N/A
10	Hernanda Zulfi	27 January 1997	1.97 m (6 ft 6 in)	87 kg (192 lb)	335 cm (132 in)	300 cm (120 in)	(Indonesia) N/A
15	Agil Angga Anggara	15 May 2000	1.91 m (6 ft 3 in)	75 kg (165 lb)	337 cm (133 in)	325 cm (128 in)	(Indonesia) N/A
17	Doni Haryono	21 February 1999	1.88 m (6 ft 2 in)	75 kg (165 lb)	330 cm (130 in)	300 cm (120 in)	(Indonesia) N/A
18	I Putu Randu Wahyu Pradana Putra	15 January 1994	1.96 m (6 ft 5 in)	85 kg (187 lb)	335 cm (132 in)	300 cm (120 in)	(Indonesia) N/A
19	Fahreza Rakha Abhinaya	6 December 1999	1.73 m (5 ft 8 in)	73 kg (161 lb)	310 cm (120 in)	290 cm (110 in)	(Indonesia) N/A
20	Nizar Julfikar Munawar	9 December 1994	1.84 m (6 ft 0 in)	65 kg (143 lb)	315 cm (124 in)	300 cm (120 in)	(Indonesia) N/A

=== Kuwait ===
The following is the Kuwaiti roster in the 2019 Asian Men's Volleyball Championship.

Head Coach: Mohamed Kaabar

No.	Name	Date of birth	Height	Weight	Spike	Block	2019 club
1	Abdulwahab Naser Aljiran (c)	27 February 1990	1.85 m (6 ft 1 in)	80 kg (180 lb)	320 cm (130 in)	310 cm (120 in)	(Kuwait) N/A
2	Abdulaziz Najum Mahmoud	25 February 1996	1.96 m (6 ft 5 in)	89 kg (196 lb)	360 cm (140 in)	350 cm (140 in)	(Kuwait) N/A
4	Abdulaziz J S M A Alshatti	23 December 1996	1.95 m (6 ft 5 in)	90 kg (200 lb)	330 cm (130 in)	320 cm (130 in)	(Kuwait) N/A
7	Bader Abdullah Salim	17 November 1994	1.93 m (6 ft 4 in)	72 kg (159 lb)	350 cm (140 in)	340 cm (130 in)	(Kuwait) N/A
8	Ali Hussain Abdullah	22 April 1996	1.78 m (5 ft 10 in)	73 kg (161 lb)	330 cm (130 in)	320 cm (130 in)	(Kuwait) N/A
10	Abdulrahman Yousif Almutawa	14 February 1995	1.92 m (6 ft 4 in)	90 kg (200 lb)	350 cm (140 in)	335 cm (132 in)	(Kuwait) N/A
13	Naser Mohammed Dashti	30 July 1992	1.98 m (6 ft 6 in)	90 kg (200 lb)	350 cm (140 in)	340 cm (130 in)	(Kuwait) N/A
15	Ebrahim Mandil Alfadhli	5 May 1996	1.8 m (5 ft 11 in)	67 kg (148 lb)	330 cm (130 in)	320 cm (130 in)	(Kuwait) N/A
16	Abdulrahman J M E Alhay	9 December 2000	1.7 m (5 ft 7 in)	70 kg (150 lb)	280 cm (110 in)	270 cm (110 in)	(Kuwait) N/A
17	Rashed Saleh Anbar	14 August 1997	1.89 m (6 ft 2 in)	71 kg (157 lb)	315 cm (124 in)	285 cm (112 in)	(Kuwait) N/A
18	Abdulaziz Shakir Saleem	28 November 1998	1.7 m (5 ft 7 in)	70 kg (150 lb)	280 cm (110 in)	270 cm (110 in)	(Kuwait) N/A
20	Hussain Faisal Almesri	25 June 1994	1.94 m (6 ft 4 in)	93 kg (205 lb)	340 cm (130 in)	330 cm (130 in)	(Kuwait) N/A

=== South Korea ===
The following is the Korean roster in the 2019 Asian Men's Volleyball Championship.

Head Coach: Im Do-heon

No.	Name	Date of birth	Height	Weight	Spike	Block	2019 club
1	Hwang Taek-eui	12 November 1996	1.89 m (6 ft 2 in)	79 kg (174 lb)	305 cm (120 in)	300 cm (120 in)	(South Korea) KB Insurance Stars
3	Na Gyeong-bok	8 April 1994	1.95 m (6 ft 5 in)	78 kg (172 lb)	320 cm (130 in)	315 cm (124 in)	(South Korea) Woori Card Wibee
4	Jeong Min-su	5 October 1991	1.78 m (5 ft 10 in)	75 kg (165 lb)	285 cm (112 in)	280 cm (110 in)	(South Korea) KB Insurance Stars
5	Lee Sang-uk	8 July 1995	1.83 m (6 ft 0 in)	73 kg (161 lb)	290 cm (110 in)	285 cm (112 in)	(South Korea) Woori Card Wibee
7	Heo Su-bong	7 April 1998	1.97 m (6 ft 6 in)	75 kg (165 lb)	320 cm (130 in)	310 cm (120 in)	(South Korea) Sangmu
9	Kwak Seung-suk	23 March 1988	1.9 m (6 ft 3 in)	81 kg (179 lb)	310 cm (120 in)	300 cm (120 in)	(South Korea) Korean Air Jumbos
10	Jung Ji-seok	10 March 1995	1.94 m (6 ft 4 in)	87 kg (192 lb)	310 cm (120 in)	300 cm (120 in)	(South Korea) Korean Air Jumbos
11	Choi Min-ho	28 April 1988	1.98 m (6 ft 6 in)	86 kg (190 lb)	320 cm (130 in)	312 cm (123 in)	(South Korea) Hyundai Capital Skywalkers
12	Jin Seong-tae	3 February 1993	1.97 m (6 ft 6 in)	85 kg (187 lb)	315 cm (124 in)	305 cm (120 in)	(South Korea) Korean Air Jumbos
14	Jo Jae-sung	1 August 1995	1.93 m (6 ft 4 in)	79 kg (174 lb)	300 cm (120 in)	285 cm (112 in)	(South Korea) OK Savings Bank Rush & Cash
15	Im Dong-hyeok	9 March 1999	1.99 m (6 ft 6 in)	86 kg (190 lb)	320 cm (130 in)	300 cm (120 in)	(South Korea) Korean Air Jumbos
17	Kwak Myoung-woo	8 April 1991	1.93 m (6 ft 4 in)	83 kg (183 lb)	310 cm (120 in)	300 cm (120 in)	(South Korea) OK Savings Bank Rush & Cash
18	Shin Yung-suk	4 October 1986	1.98 m (6 ft 6 in)	90 kg (200 lb)	335 cm (132 in)	320 cm (130 in)	(South Korea) Hyundai Capital Skywalkers
19	Kim Jae-hwi	6 September 1993	2.04 m (6 ft 8 in)	85 kg (187 lb)	330 cm (130 in)	320 cm (130 in)	(South Korea) Sangmu

=== Pakistan ===
The following is the Pakistani roster in the 2019 Asian Men's Volleyball Championship.

Head Coach: Kim Kyoung-hoon

No.	Name	Date of birth	Height	Weight	Spike	Block	2019 club
3	USMAN FARYAD ALI	22 May 1999	1.93 m (6 ft 4 in)	70 kg (150 lb)	326 cm (128 in)	306 cm (120 in)	(Pakistan) N/A
4	Farooq Haidar	26 June 1992	1.97 m (6 ft 6 in)	76 kg (168 lb)	342 cm (135 in)	315 cm (124 in)	(Pakistan) N/A
5	Nadeem Asif	25 December 1986	1.9 m (6 ft 3 in)	86 kg (190 lb)	295 cm (116 in)	277 cm (109 in)	(Pakistan) NAVY
6	Sheraz Sheraz	27 October 1993	1.99 m (6 ft 6 in)	81 kg (179 lb)	324 cm (128 in)	295 cm (116 in)	(Pakistan) N/A
7	Mubashir Raza	1 January 1992	1.91 m (6 ft 3 in)	84 kg (185 lb)	320 cm (130 in)	290 cm (110 in)	(Pakistan) N/A
8	Khan Aimal (c)	10 August 1990	2.04 m (6 ft 8 in)	80 kg (180 lb)	335 cm (132 in)	310 cm (120 in)	(Pakistan) WAPDA
9	FAKHAR UD DIN	1 December 1995	1.92 m (6 ft 4 in)	91 kg (201 lb)	340 cm (130 in)	310 cm (120 in)	(Pakistan) N/A
12	Bilal Khan	31 December 2000	1.74 m (5 ft 9 in)	71 kg (157 lb)	293 cm (115 in)	283 cm (111 in)	(Pakistan) N/A
13	Muhammad Kashif Naveed	1 January 1994	1.9 m (6 ft 3 in)	79 kg (174 lb)	305 cm (120 in)	285 cm (112 in)	(Pakistan) N/A
14	Abdul Zaheer	25 February 1996	2.01 m (6 ft 7 in)	89 kg (196 lb)	340 cm (130 in)	315 cm (124 in)	(Pakistan) N/A
15	Murad Jehan	22 April 1994	1.99 m (6 ft 6 in)	90 kg (200 lb)	325 cm (128 in)	295 cm (116 in)	(Pakistan) N/A
17	Muhammad Idrees	25 December 1994	1.97 m (6 ft 6 in)	86 kg (190 lb)	325 cm (128 in)	300 cm (120 in)	(Pakistan) N/A
18	Nasir Ali	12 May 1992	1.74 m (5 ft 9 in)	65 kg (143 lb)	290 cm (110 in)	271 cm (107 in)	(Pakistan) N/A
