= 2021 Asian Men's Club Volleyball Championship squads =

This article shows the rosters of all participating teams at the 2021 Asian Men's Club Volleyball Championship in Nakhon Ratchasima, Thailand.

== Pool A ==
=== Nakhon Ratchasima ===
The following is the roster of the Thai club Nakhon Ratchasima VC in the 2021 Asian Club Championship.
Head coach: (Thailand) Padejsuk Vannachote

No.	Name	Date of birth	Height
1	(Thailand) Narongrit Jantasing	July 18, 2001 (aged 20)	1.65 m (5 ft 5 in)
3	(Thailand) Wanchai Tabwises	February 11, 1986 (aged 35)	1.86 m (6 ft 1 in)
6	(Thailand) Murhamhad Chenjang	July 14, 2002 (aged 19)	1.94 m (6 ft 4 in)
9	(Thailand) Nantawut Taengkrathok	March 4, 1990 (aged 31)	1.90 m (6 ft 3 in)
10	(Thailand) Boonyarid Wongtorn	January 29, 1998 (aged 23)	1.84 m (6 ft 0 in)
11	(Indonesia) Galih Bayu Saputra	February 22, 1993 (aged 28)	1.89 m (6 ft 2 in)
12	(Thailand) Kittipong Suksala	October 3, 1997 (aged 24)	2.02 m (6 ft 8 in)
13	(Thailand) Jirawan Thumtong	February 23, 1998 (aged 23)	1.80 m (5 ft 11 in)
14	(Thailand) Tanapat Charoensuk	May 14, 1991 (aged 30)	1.74 m (5 ft 9 in)
17	(Thailand) Saranchit Charoensuk	July 20, 1987 (aged 34)	1.80 m (5 ft 11 in)
19	(Thailand) Thanat Bumrungpakdee	August 9, 2001 (aged 20)	1.91 m (6 ft 3 in)
23	(Thailand) Chatmongkhon Paketkhaeo	May 4, 1997 (aged 24)	1.94 m (6 ft 4 in)
24	(Thailand) Amorntep Konhan	October 5, 1995 (aged 26)	1.86 m (6 ft 1 in)
25	(Thailand) Chakkrit Chandahuadong	November 5, 1996 (aged 24)	1.83 m (6 ft 0 in)

=== CEB ===
The following is the roster of the Sri Lankan club CEB in the 2021 Asian Club Championship.
Head coach: (Sri Lanka) Ranasingha Arachchilage Chaminda Kumara Jayarathna

No.	Name	Date of birth	Height
2	(Sri Lanka) Kasun Mahanthi Acharige	October 15, 1990 (aged 30)	1.85 m (6 ft 1 in)
3	(Sri Lanka) Ayesh Perera	May 1, 1996 (aged 25)	1.98 m (6 ft 6 in)
6	(Sri Lanka) Lasantha Suram Pathirana Arachchillage	May 13, 1993 (aged 28)	1.85 m (6 ft 1 in)
6	(Sri Lanka) Sanka Kalu Badana Jayarathne	June 2, 1999 (aged 22)	1.87 m (6 ft 2 in)
8	(Sri Lanka) Nishan Kodisinghe Arachchige	October 31, 1996 (aged 24)	1.96 m (6 ft 5 in)
9	(Sri Lanka) Shehan Kumara Bandara Mudiyaselage	May 26, 1997 (aged 24)	1.85 m (6 ft 1 in)
10	(Sri Lanka) Lakmal Abesing Wijesekara	March 13, 1991 (aged 30)	1.66 m (5 ft 5 in)
11	(Sri Lanka) Kulara Marku Matheslage Don	May 9, 1998 (aged 23)	1.70 m (5 ft 7 in)
12	(Sri Lanka) Kasun Chathuranga Fernando	October 25, 1986 (aged 34)	1.73 m (5 ft 8 in)
13	(Sri Lanka) Ruchira Dolawaththa	January 20, 2000 (aged 21)	1.83 m (6 ft 0 in)
14	(Sri Lanka) Vidura Prabath Perera	December 12, 2000 (aged 20)	1.81 m (5 ft 11 in)
16	(Sri Lanka) Ruwakshan Aluthgama Hewage	May 8, 1995 (aged 26)	1.85 m (6 ft 1 in)
17	(Sri Lanka) Hirushan Batepola Arachchige	January 12, 1998 (aged 23)	1.87 m (6 ft 2 in)
18	(Sri Lanka) Deepthi Romesh Ranawaka	January 22, 1992 (aged 29)	1.85 m (6 ft 1 in)

=== Burevestnik Almaty ===
The following is the roster of the Kazakh club Burevestnik Almaty in the 2021 Asian Club Championship.
Head coach: (Kazakhstan) Alexandr Zapevalov

No.	Name	Date of birth	Height
1	(Kazakhstan) Sergey Rezanov	November 22, 1994 (aged 26)	1.96 m (6 ft 5 in)
2	(Kazakhstan) Kirill Gurin	January 13, 1995 (aged 26)	1.96 m (6 ft 5 in)
3	(Kazakhstan) Vladislav Kunchenko	January 13, 1998 (aged 23)	1.89 m (6 ft 2 in)
4	(Kazakhstan) Baglan Rakhmanov	May 6, 1996 (aged 25)	1.77 m (5 ft 10 in)
6	(Kazakhstan) Kanat Gabdullin	March 4, 1995 (aged 26)	1.96 m (6 ft 5 in)
9	(Kazakhstan) Sergey Okunev	April 29, 1990 (aged 31)	1.83 m (6 ft 0 in)
10	(Kazakhstan) Nurdos Aldash	April 9, 2000 (aged 21)	2.00 m (6 ft 7 in)
12	(Kazakhstan) Nodirkhan Kadirkhanov	September 6, 1991 (aged 30)	2.03 m (6 ft 8 in)
13	(Kazakhstan) Vladimir Prokofyev	February 9, 1993 (aged 28)	2.03 m (6 ft 8 in)
18	(Kazakhstan) Vitaliy Vorivodin	July 31, 1990 (aged 31)	1.97 m (6 ft 6 in)
21	(Kazakhstan) Mikhail Ustinov	December 22, 1989 (aged 31)	1.90 m (6 ft 3 in)

=== Kazma ===
The following is the roster of the Kuwaiti club Kazma in the 2021 Asian Club Championship.
Head coach: (Brazil) Fabiano Preturlon

No.	Name	Date of birth	Height
2	(Kuwait) Mousa Baharoh	February 9, 1982 (aged 39)	1.88 m (6 ft 2 in)
3	(Dominican Republic) Elvis Contreras	July 20, 1979 (aged 42)	1.95 m (6 ft 5 in)
4	(Kuwait) Abdulrahman Alhay	December 9, 2000 (aged 20)	1.72 m (5 ft 8 in)
5	(Kuwait) Musaed Almejmed	May 14, 1991 (aged 30)	1.95 m (6 ft 5 in)
7	(Kuwait) Abdulrazzaq Allughani	June 9, 1994 (aged 27)	1.85 m (6 ft 1 in)
8	(Kuwait) Talal Alyaqout	April 11, 2003 (aged 18)	1.94 m (6 ft 4 in)
9	(Kuwait) Meshal Alomar	June 29, 1989 (aged 32)	1.96 m (6 ft 5 in)
10	(Kuwait) Abdulrahman Almutawa	February 14, 1995 (aged 26)	1.92 m (6 ft 4 in)
11	(Kuwait) Mubarak Mubarak	January 13, 1990 (aged 31)	1.96 m (6 ft 5 in)
12	(Kuwait) Abdulaziz Al Shatti	February 23, 1996 (aged 25)	1.96 m (6 ft 5 in)
17	(Kuwait) Abdullah Al-Anzi	March 16, 1991 (aged 30)	1.77 m (5 ft 10 in)
18	(Kuwait) Abdulaziz Saleem	November 28, 1988 (aged 32)	1.70 m (5 ft 7 in)
20	(Kuwait) Saoud Alsalman	July 28, 2001 (aged 20)	1.75 m (5 ft 9 in)
22	(Kuwait) Ali Abdullah	April 22, 1996 (aged 25)	1.77 m (5 ft 10 in)

=== South Gas ===
The following is the roster of the Iraqi club South Gas in the 2021 Asian Club Championship.
Head coach: (Iraq) Alaa Khalaf Abdulsattar

No.	Name	Date of birth	Height
1	(Iraq) Hussein Nameer	March 26, 1994 (aged 27)	1.91 m (6 ft 3 in)
2	(Iraq) Kareem Hadi	March 16, 1989 (aged 32)	1.65 m (5 ft 5 in)
3	(Iraq) Husam Abdulsamad	May 20, 1990 (aged 31)	1.82 m (6 ft 0 in)
4	(Iraq) Safaa Lafta	August 22, 1986 (aged 35)	1.91 m (6 ft 3 in)
6	(Iraq) Mustafa Hameed	February 19, 1987 (aged 34)	1.93 m (6 ft 4 in)
9	(Cuba) Alfredo Zequeira	June 28, 1996 (aged 25)	1.98 m (6 ft 6 in)
11	(Iraq) Maher Adnan	July 20, 2001 (aged 20)	2.01 m (6 ft 7 in)
12	(Bosnia and Herzegovina) Nenad Sormaz	March 19, 1992 (aged 29)	2.00 m (6 ft 7 in)
13	(Iraq) Abbas Abdukarem	March 30, 1999 (aged 22)	1.75 m (5 ft 9 in)
14	(Iraq) Mohammed Saleh	August 8, 1985 (aged 36)	1.97 m (6 ft 6 in)
15	(Iraq) Omar Ali	October 12, 1994 (aged 26)	1.96 m (6 ft 5 in)
16	(Iraq) Reath Azeez	September 29, 1991 (aged 30)	1.97 m (6 ft 6 in)
17	(Iraq) Islam Sachit	December 25, 1995 (aged 25)	1.99 m (6 ft 6 in)
20	(Egypt) Ahmed Said	December 7, 1994 (aged 26)	1.94 m (6 ft 4 in)

== Pool B ==
=== Foolad Sirjan ===
The following is the roster of the Iranian club Foolad Sirjan in the 2021 Asian Club Championship.
Head coach: (Iran) Saeid Rezaei

No.	Name	Date of birth	Height
1	(Iran) Sahand Allah Verdian	December 8, 1995 (aged 25)	2.00 m (6 ft 7 in)
2	(Iran) Mahdi Jelveh Ghaziani	May 21, 2001 (aged 20)	2.06 m (6 ft 9 in)
3	(Serbia) Aleksandar Blagojević	August 5, 1993 (aged 28)	2.00 m (6 ft 7 in)
5	(Iran) Amirhossein Derakhshan	August 2, 1986 (aged 35)	1.90 m (6 ft 3 in)
7	(Iran) Ramin Khani	November 27, 1992 (aged 28)	1.93 m (6 ft 4 in)
8	(Iran) Rasoul Shahsavari Nejad	January 21, 1993 (aged 28)	1.85 m (6 ft 1 in)
9	(Iran) Ali Asghar Razm Far	March 18, 1991 (aged 30)	2.02 m (6 ft 8 in)
10	(Iran) Mohammad Sadeghi Malati	August 28, 1994 (aged 27)	2.04 m (6 ft 8 in)
11	(Iran) Shahrooz Homayonfarmanesh	December 18, 1989 (aged 31)	1.95 m (6 ft 5 in)
12	(Iran) Mojtaba Gholizad	March 26, 1990 (aged 31)	1.98 m (6 ft 6 in)
13	(Iran) Alireza Behboudi	March 10, 1979 (aged 42)	1.94 m (6 ft 4 in)
18	(Iran) Armin Tashakkori	December 8, 1986 (aged 34)	1.98 m (6 ft 6 in)
19	(Iran) Saber Kazemi	December 24, 1998 (aged 22)	2.05 m (6 ft 9 in)
20	(Iran) Mostafa Heydari	December 14, 1991 (aged 29)	1.78 m (5 ft 10 in)

=== Rebisco ===
The following is the roster of the Philippines national team competing as Rebisco PH in the 2021 Asian Club Championship.
Head coach: Dante Alinsunurin Jr.

No.	Name	Date of birth	Height
2	(Philippines) John Paul Bugaoan	January 8, 1999 (aged 22)	1.90 m (6 ft 3 in)
4	(Philippines) Joshua Retamar	March 7, 2000 (aged 21)	1.82 m (6 ft 0 in)
5	(Philippines) Manuel Sumanguid III	January 5, 1998 (aged 23)	1.70 m (5 ft 7 in)
6	(Philippines) Kim Malabunga	May 8, 1996 (aged 25)	1.95 m (6 ft 5 in)
7	(Philippines) Rex Intal	September 7, 1994 (aged 27)	1.87 m (6 ft 2 in)
8	(Philippines) Mark Gil Alfafara	January 28, 1994 (aged 27)	1.83 m (6 ft 0 in)
9	(Philippines) Nicolas Almendras	July 27, 1999 (aged 22)	1.90 m (6 ft 3 in)
10	(Philippines) John Vic De Guzman	September 23, 1993 (aged 28)	1.88 m (6 ft 2 in)
11	(Philippines) Joshua Umandal	March 8, 1999 (aged 22)	1.88 m (6 ft 2 in)
12	(Philippines) Francis Suara	May 2, 1996 (aged 25)	1.95 m (6 ft 5 in)
14	(Philippines) Esmilzo Polvorosa	March 22, 1997 (aged 24)	1.83 m (6 ft 0 in)
16	(Philippines) Ricky Marcos	August 1, 1996 (aged 25)	1.62 m (5 ft 4 in)
17	(Philippines) Jessie Lopez	March 29, 1986 (aged 35)	1.78 m (5 ft 10 in)
19	(Philippines) Ysay Marasigan	September 24, 1994 (aged 27)	1.83 m (6 ft 0 in)

=== Al-Arabi ===
The following is the roster of the Qatari club Al-Arabi in the 2021 Asian Club Championship.
Head coach: (Argentina) Juan Manuel Cichello

No.	Name	Date of birth	Height
1	(Qatar) Borislav Georgiev	December 5, 1992 (aged 28)	1.85 m (6 ft 1 in)
2	(Qatar) Jumah Faraj	April 14, 1985 (aged 36)	1.95 m (6 ft 5 in)
4	(Qatar) Renan Ribeiro	December 30, 1989 (aged 31)	1.91 m (6 ft 3 in)
5	(Qatar) Omar Hisham	August 13, 1987 (aged 34)	1.96 m (6 ft 5 in)
6	(Qatar) John Kennedy Chigbo	April 4, 1989 (aged 32)	2.05 m (6 ft 9 in)
10	(Qatar) Marko Stevanović	July 25, 1987 (aged 34)	1.88 m (6 ft 2 in)
12	(Qatar) Bojan Djukic	June 6, 1991 (aged 30)	1.93 m (6 ft 4 in)
13	(Brazil) Felipe Bandero	December 6, 1988 (aged 32)	2.00 m (6 ft 7 in)
15	(Qatar) Mahdi Badreddin Sammoud	March 22, 1991 (aged 30)	1.95 m (6 ft 5 in)
16	(Qatar) Mohamed Ibrahim Ibrahim	January 15, 1985 (aged 36)	2.06 m (6 ft 9 in)
18	(Qatar) Abdulaziz Batti Al Hitmi	January 14, 1995 (aged 26)	1.90 m (6 ft 3 in)
18	(Serbia) Konstantin Čupković	February 1, 1987 (aged 34)	2.02 m (6 ft 8 in)

=== Diamond Food ===
The following is the roster of the Thai club Diamond Food in the 2021 Asian Club Championship.
Head coach: (Thailand) Somboon Nakpung

No.	Name	Date of birth	Height
2	(Thailand) Yutthakan Boonrat	July 14, 1999 (aged 22)	1.65 m (5 ft 5 in)
6	(Thailand) Patcharaphon Phoungbubpha	December 25, 2000 (aged 20)	1.98 m (6 ft 6 in)
7	(Thailand) Toopadit Phraput	February 17, 2000 (aged 21)	1.91 m (6 ft 3 in)
8	(Thailand) Pusit Phonarin	January 3, 1997 (aged 24)	1.84 m (6 ft 0 in)
9	(Thailand) Pipat Chansuksri	February 24, 2000 (aged 21)	1.85 m (6 ft 1 in)
10	(Thailand) Kittikun Sriutthawong	January 10, 1986 (aged 35)	1.94 m (6 ft 4 in)
12	(Thailand) Anuchit Pakdeekaew	September 29, 1996 (aged 25)	1.92 m (6 ft 4 in)
15	(Thailand) Supachai Khamhom	February 9, 2002 (aged 19)	1.62 m (5 ft 4 in)
16	(Thailand) Kantapat Koonmee	April 17, 1998 (aged 23)	2.04 m (6 ft 8 in)
20	(Thailand) Thanaphon Chunchoem	September 22, 1998 (aged 23)	1.79 m (5 ft 10 in)
21	(Thailand) Chaiwat Thungkham	August 14, 2000 (aged 21)	1.86 m (6 ft 1 in)
22	(Thailand) Natthaphong Khaenak	December 19, 2000 (aged 20)	1.79 m (5 ft 10 in)
24	(Belarus) Aliaksandr Navaletau	September 1, 1995 (aged 26)	1.96 m (6 ft 5 in)
25	(Thailand) Kissada Nilsawai	April 17, 1992 (aged 29)	2.02 m (6 ft 8 in)

=== AGMK ===
The following is the roster of the Uzbek club AGMK in the 2021 Asian Club Championship.
Head coach: (Uzbekistan) Aziz Teshabaev

No.	Name	Date of birth	Height
1	(Uzbekistan) Bunyod Egamkulov	February 22, 1988 (aged 33)	1.89 m (6 ft 2 in)
2	(Uzbekistan) Bunyodbek Khosinov	November 4, 1996 (aged 24)	1.92 m (6 ft 4 in)
3	(Uzbekistan) Umidjon Yuldashev	December 25, 1998 (aged 22)	1.87 m (6 ft 2 in)
5	(Uzbekistan) Mukhammadali Rasulov	May 27, 1992 (aged 29)	1.96 m (6 ft 5 in)
6	(Uzbekistan) Sanjar Akhtamov	July 28, 1999 (aged 22)	1.93 m (6 ft 4 in)
8	(Uzbekistan) Khabibullokhon Isamov	January 18, 1999 (aged 22)	1.86 m (6 ft 1 in)
9	(Uzbekistan) Dilmurod Sattorov	September 28, 1993 (aged 28)	1.76 m (5 ft 9 in)
10	(Uzbekistan) Azizbek Kuchkorov	December 16, 1999 (aged 21)	2.00 m (6 ft 7 in)
12	(Uzbekistan) Ilyos Meliev	April 16, 1987 (aged 34)	1.90 m (6 ft 3 in)
13	(Uzbekistan) Shokhrukh Temirov	February 21, 1999 (aged 22)	1.95 m (6 ft 5 in)
14	(Uzbekistan) Mukhammad Kobuljonov	April 3, 1999 (aged 22)	1.94 m (6 ft 4 in)
15	(Uzbekistan) Umidjon Sharipov	February 21, 2001 (aged 20)	1.84 m (6 ft 0 in)
16	(Uzbekistan) Javokhir KHushvaktov	November 22, 2002 (aged 18)	1.92 m (6 ft 4 in)
