= 2016 Men's Volleyball Thai-Denmark Super League =

Tournament details
- Host country: MCC Hall of The Mall Bangkapi Bangkok, Thailand
- Dates: 23–28 March 2016
- Teams: 6
- Venue: 1 (in 1 host city)

Final positions
- Champions: Nakhon Ratchasima (1st title)

Tournament awards
- MVP: (Myanmar) Aung Thu

2016 Men's Volleyball Thai-Denmark Super League (Thai: วอลเลย์บอลชายไทยเดนมาร์คซูเปอร์ลีก 2016) was the third edition of the tournament. It was held at the MCC Hall of The Mall Bangkapi in Bangkok, Thailand from 23 to 28 March 2016.

== Teams ==
- Chonburi E-Tech Air Force
- Kasesart
- Nakhon Ratchasima
- Ratchaburi
- Sisaket Krungkao
- Wing 46 Phitsanulok

== Pools composition ==
Pool A	Pool B
Wing 46 Phitsanulok; Chonburi E-Tech Air Force; Ratchaburi	Nakhon Ratchasima; Sisaket Krungkao; Kasetsart

== Preliminary round ==
=== Pool A ===
Pos	Team	Pld	W	L	Pts	SW	SL	SR	SPW	SPL	SPR	Qualification
1	Wing 46 Phitsanulok	2	2	0	6	6	1	6.000	178	143	1.245	Semifinals
2	Sisaket Krungkao	2	1	1	2	3	5	0.600	146	177	0.825	Semifinals
3	Ratchaburi	2	0	2	1	3	6	0.500	200	204	0.980	

Date	Time		Score		Set 1	Set 2	Set 3	Set 4	Set 5	Total	Report
23 Mar	12:00	Wing 46 Phitsanulok	3–1	Ratchaburi	25–23	27–29	25–22	26–24		103–98	
24 Mar	10:00	Wing 46 Phitsanulok	3–0	Sisaket-Krungkao	25–15	25–13	25–17			75–45	
25 Mar	10:00	Ratchaburi	2–3	Sisaket-Krungkao	25–17	19–25	25–19	21–25	12–15	102–101	

=== Pool B ===
Pos	Team	Pld	W	L	Pts	SW	SL	SR	SPW	SPL	SPR	Qualification
1	Chonburi E-Tech Air Force	2	2	0	6	6	1	6.000	175	137	1.277	Semifinals
2	Nakhon Ratchasima	2	1	1	3	4	4	1.000	193	191	1.010	Semifinals
3	Kasetsart	2	0	2	0	1	6	0.167	132	175	0.754	

Date	Time		Score		Set 1	Set 2	Set 3	Set 4	Set 5	Total	Report
23 Mar	14:00	Nakhon Ratchasima	3–1	Kasetsart	25–23	25–27	25–23	25–15		100–88	
24 Mar	12:00	Nakhon Ratchasima	1–3	Chonburi E-Tech Air Force	26–24	27–29	22–25	18–25		93–103	
25 Mar	12:00	Kasetsart	0–3	Chonburi E-Tech Air Force	16–25	13–25	15–25			44–75	

== Final round ==
Semifinals
27 March
Wing 46 Phitsanulok	2
Nakhon Ratchasima	3
27 March
Chonburi E-Tech Air Force	3
Sisaket Krungkao	0

Final
28 March
Nakhon Ratchasima	3
Chonburi E-Tech Air Force	1

=== Semifinals ===
Date	Time		Score		Set 1	Set 2	Set 3	Set 4	Set 5	Total	Report
27 Mar	12:00	Chonburi E-Tech Air Force	3–0	Sisaket Krungkao	25–13	25–16	25–20			75–49	
27 Mar	14:00	Wing 46 Phitsanulok	2–3	Nakhon Ratchasima	13–25	21–25	25–21	26–24	9–15	94–110	

=== Final ===
Date	Time		Score		Set 1	Set 2	Set 3	Set 4	Set 5	Total	Report
28 Mar	12:00	Nakhon Ratchasima	3–1	Chonburi E-Tech Air Force	25–15	25–21	20–25	25–23		95–84	

== Final standing ==
Rank	Team
1st place, gold medalist(s)	Nakhon Ratchasima
2nd place, silver medalist(s)	Chonburi E-Tech Air Force
3rd place, bronze medalist(s)	Wing 46 Phitsanulok
3rd place, bronze medalist(s)	Sisaket Krungkao
5	Ratchaburi
5	Kasetsart

== Awards ==
Award	Winner	Team
MVP	(Myanmar) Aung Thu	Nakhon Ratchasima
Best scorer	(Myanmar) Aung Thu	Nakhon Ratchasima
Best spiker	(Myanmar) Aung Thu	Nakhon Ratchasima
Best blocker	(Thailand) Jirayu Raksakaew	Chonburi E-Tech Air Force
Best server	(Myanmar) Aung Thu	Nakhon Ratchasima
Best setter	(Thailand) Anucha Pinsuwan	Nakhon Ratchasima
Best libero	(Thailand) Kraisorn Sritha	Nakhon Ratchasima

== See also ==
- 2016 Women's Volleyball Thai-Denmark Super League
