= Amorntep Konhan =

Thai volleyball player (born 1995)

Personal information
- Full name: Amorntep Konhan
- Nickname: June
- Born: 6 October 1995 (age 31); Mukdahan, Thailand
- Height: 1.86 m (6 ft 1 in)
- Weight: 79 kg (174 lb)
- Spike: 325 cm (128 in)
- Block: 315 cm (124 in)

Volleyball information
- Position: Opposite
- Current club: (Thailand) Nakhon Ratchasima
- Number: 3 (National Team), 95 (Club)

National team
2018–present	Thailand
Honours
Men's volleyball
Representing Thailand
Southeast Asian Games
Bronze medal – third place	2019 Philippines	Team
Gold medal – first place	2025 Bangkok	Team

Amorntep Konhan (Thai: อมรเทพ คนหาญ; born October 6, 1995) is a member of the Thailand men's national volleyball team. He is a currently playing for Phitsanulok.

== Clubs ==
- (Thailand) Phetchabun (2013)
- (Thailand) Phitsanulok (2015–2024)
- (Malaysia) Sabah Rhino (2021–2022)
- (Thailand) Nakhon Ratchasima (2024–)

== Award ==
=== Individual ===
- 2015–16 Thailand League – "Best Opposite"
- 2017–18 Thailand League – "Best Opposite"
- 2018–19 Thailand League – "Best Scorer"
- 2018–19 Thailand League – "Best Opposite"
- 2019–20 Thailand League – "Best Scorer"
- 2020–21 Thailand League – "Best Scorer"
- 2021–22 Thailand League – "Best Server"
- 2021–22 Thailand League – "Best Scorer"
- 2021–22 Sooka Super Series – "Best Opposite"
- 2023–24 Thailand League – "Best Opposite"
- 2024–25 Win Streak Volleyball Invitational – "Most Valuable Player"
- 2025 SEA V.League – "Most Valuable Player"

=== Clubs ===
- 2015–16 Thailand League - Champion, with Phitsanulok
- 2015 Thai–Denmark Super League - Runner-up, with Phitsanulok
- 2016 Thai–Denmark Super League - Third, with Phitsanulok
- 2017–18 Thailand League - Third, with Phitsanulok
- 2019 Thai–Denmark Super League - Third, with Phitsanulok
- 2019–20 Thailand League - Third, with Phitsanulok
- 2020–21 Thailand League - Third, with Phitsanulok
- 2021–22 Thailand League - Runner-up, with Phitsanulok
- 2021–22 Thailand League - Runner-up, with Phitsanulok
- 2023–24 Thailand League - Third, with Phitsanulok
- 2024–25 Thailand League - Champion, with Nakhon Ratchasima
- 2025–26 Thailand League - Champion, with Nakhon Ratchasima
