= Kamlesh Khatik =

Indian volleyball player (born 1991)

Indian Volleyball Player Kamlesh Khatik
Personal information
- Nationality: Indian
- Citizenship: India
- Born: 27 October 1991 (age 34) Bhilwara, Rajasthan
- Education: Bachelor of Arts
- Years active: present
- Employer: Sub Inspector In Rajasthan police
- Height: 5 ft 9 in (175 cm)

Sport
- Country: India
- Sport: Volleyball
- League: Pro Volleyball League
- Club: Black Hawks Hyderabad

Achievements and titles
- World finals: 20th Asian Senior Men's Volleyball Championship

Kamlesh Khatik also known as The Flying Libero is an Indian Volleyball player who is selected to Indian volleyball team which is going to participate in "20th Asian Senior Men's Volleyball Championship" with Qatar team to be held in Doha, Qatar from 30 August to 10 September 2019.

After that, team will participate in "20th Asian Senior Men's Volleyball Championship" with Iran team to be held in Tehran, Iran from 13 September to 21 September 2019.
