= Vitaliy Vorivodin =

Kazakhstani volleyball player (born 1990)

Personal information
- Nationality: Kazakhstani
- Born: 31 July 1990 (age 36)
- Height: 194 cm (6 ft 4 in)
- Weight: 101 kg (223 lb)
- Spike: 347 cm (137 in)
- Block: 335 cm (132 in)

Volleyball information
- Number: 18 (national team)

Career
- Years: Team
- 2015: Almaty Vc

National team
- Years: Team
- 2015: Kazakhstan

Vitaliy Vorivodin (born 31 July 1990) is a Kazakhstani male volleyball player. He is part of the Kazakhstan men's national volleyball team. On club level he plays for Almaty Vc.
