= Vladimir Prokofyev =

Kazakhstani volleyball player (born 1993)

Personal information
- Nationality: Kazakhstani
- Born: 9 February 1993 (age 33)
- Height: 203 cm (6 ft 8 in)
- Weight: 94 kg (207 lb)
- Spike: 345 cm (136 in)
- Block: 330 cm (130 in)

Volleyball information
- Number: 15 (national team)

Career
- Years: Team
- 2015: Kondensat-Zhaikmunay

National team
- Years: Team
- 2015: Kazakhstan

Vladimir Prokofyev (born 9 February 1993) is a Kazakhstani male volleyball player. He is part of the Kazakhstan men's national volleyball team. On club level he plays for Kondensat-Zhaikmunay.
