= Nodirkhan Kadirkhanov =

Kazakhstani volleyball player (born 1991)

Personal information
- Nationality: Kazakhstani
- Born: 6 September 1991 (age 35)
- Height: 203 cm (6 ft 8 in)
- Weight: 95 kg (209 lb)
- Spike: 350 cm (138 in)
- Block: 345 cm (136 in)

Volleyball information
- Number: 12 (national team)

Career
| Years | Teams |
|---|---|
| 2006 | Almaty Vc |

National team
| 2009 - | Kazakhstan |

Nodirkhan Kadirkhanov (born 6 September 1991) is a Kazakhstani male volleyball player. He is a member of the Kazakhstan men's national volleyball team. Domestically he plays for Taraz.
