= 2025 AVC Men's Volleyball Champions League squads =

Squads of the Asian Volleyball Confederation

This article shows the rosters of all participating teams at the 2025 AVC Men's Volleyball Champions League in Hirakata and Kyoto, Japan.

Previously known as the Asian Men's Club Volleyball Championship, the AVC Men's Champions League allows each team can now have a maximum of three foreign players in its roster that can play at any time. Previously in the Club Championship, teams can only have two foreign players and only one of which can play at a time.

For the purpose of quota, an athlete is a "foreign player" if their FIVB sporting nationality is different than the club's national volleyball federation affiliation. A player's FIVB sporting nationality is independent of their citizenship/s. A domestic league may also handle sporting nationality differently.

== Pool A ==
=== Suntory Sunbirds Osaka ===
The following is the roster of the Japanese club Suntory Sunbirds Osaka in the 2025 AVC Men's Champions League.

Head coach: (France) Olivier Lecat

- 1 (Japan) Taishi Onodera MB
- 2 (Japan) Kenji Sato MB
- 5 (Japan) Ryo Shimokawa S
- 7 (Cuba) Alain de Armas OH
- 8 (Japan) Soshi Fujinaka L
- 9 (Japan) Masaki Oya S
- 10 (Japan) Kenya Fujinaka OH
- 11 (Poland) Aleksander Śliwka OH
- 12 (Japan) Ran Takahashi OH
- 13 (Russia) Dmitry Muserskiy OP
- 14 (Japan) Ren Oniki MB
- 15 (Japan) Yoshimitsu Kiire L
- 19 (Japan) Kotaro Kai OP
- 23 (Japan) Tatsuki Kashiwada MB

=== Queensland Pirates ===
The following is the roster of the Australian club Queensland Pirates in the 2025 AVC Men's Champions League.

Head coach: (Australia) Kylie Marshall

- 1 (Australia) Connor O'Neill OP
- 2 (Australia) Kieran Ivers L
- 3 (Australia) Thomas McKinney S
- 4 (Australia) Pieter Alexander van Driel OH
- 5 (Australia) Ky Landers OH
- 6 (Australia) Ewan Thiele S
- 7 (Australia) Benjamin Carleton OH
- 8 (Australia) Angus Burton MB
- 9 (Australia) Jamie Fouche S
- 13 (Australia) Connor Rudder MB
- 16 (Australia) Bradley Sting OH
- 17 (Australia) Steven MacDonald MB
- 18 (Australia) Sam Pittorino OP
- 26 (Australia) Thomas Roberts L

=== Aktobe ===
The following is the roster of the Kazakh club Aktobe in the 2025 AVC Men's Champions League.

Head coach: (Kazakhstan) Sergey Trikoz

- 1 (Kazakhstan) Nursultan Bimurza S
- 2 (Ukraine) Roman Khandrolin S
- 4 (Kazakhstan) Azamat Seylkhanov OH
- 7 (Kazakhstan) Aybat Netalin OH
- 8 (Kazakhstan) Assylkhan Izbergenuly OH
- 9 (Russia) Kirill Kostylenko OH
- 11 (Kazakhstan) Damir Akimov MB
- 12 (Kazakhstan) Nodirkhan Kadirkhanov MB
- 14 (Kazakhstan) Adil Suleymen MB
- 17 (Kazakhstan) Berdiyar Daniyarov L
- 18 (Kazakhstan) Zhan Makhsutkhan OP
- 21 (Kazakhstan) Yerikzhan Boken L
- 26 (Russia) Nikita Shvalev OP
- 39 (Kazakhstan) Anton Kuznetsov MB

== Pool B ==
=== Osaka Bluteon ===
The following is the roster of the Japanese club Osaka Bluteon in the 2025 AVC Men's Champions League.

Head coach: (France) Laurent Tillie

- 3 (Japan) Shunsuke Nakamura S
- 5 (Japan) Shoma Tomita OH
- 7 (Japan) Yuga Tarumi OH
- 8 (Japan) Kenyu Nakamoto L
- 10 (Japan) Akihiro Yamauchi MB
- 11 (Japan) Yuji Nishida OP
- 13 (Japan) Tomohiro Yamamoto L
- 15 (Japan) Masato Kai OH
- 18 (Japan) Hiroto Nishiyama OH
- 19 (Japan) Keitaro Nishikawa MB
- 21 (Japan) Motoki Eiro S
- 23 (Japan) Larry Evbade-Dan MB
- 51 (Japan) Tatsunori Otsuka OH
- 81 (Cuba) Miguel Ángel López OH

=== Shanghai Bright ===
The following is the roster of the Chinese club Shanghai Bright in the 2025 AVC Men's Champions League.

Head coach: (China) Shen Qiong

- 1 (China) Xiu Chengcheng OP
- 2 (China) Guo Cheng S
- 3 (China) Chen Longhai MB
- 4 (China) Tian Cong OH
- 5 (China) Liu Jiajun MB
- 7 (China) Fu Houwen OH
- 8 (China) Yang Tianyuan L
- 10 (China) Wu Pengzhi OP
- 11 (Poland) Fabian Drzyzga S
- 12 (China) Zhang Zhejia MB
- 13 (Poland) Michał Kubiak OH
- 16 (China) Qu Zongshuai L
- 19 (China) Wang Bohan OH
- 22 (China) Bian Shijie MB

=== Cignal HD Spikers ===
The following is the roster of the Philippine national team (under the alias Cignal HD Spikers) in the 2025 AVC Men's Champions League.

Head coach: (Italy) Angiolino Frigoni

- 3 (Philippines) Joshua Retamar S
- 4 (Philippines) Vince Lorenzo L
- 5 (Philippines) Steve Rotter OP
- 7 (Philippines) Kim Malabunga MB
- 8 (Philippines) John Paul Bugaoan MB
- 10 (Philippines) Gabriel Ej Casaña S
- 11 (Philippines) Joshua Umandal OH
- 14 (Philippines) John Michael Paglaon L
- 15 (Philippines) Marck Espejo OH
- 16 (Philippines) Gian Carlo Glorioso MB
- 17 (Philippines) Wendel Miguel OH
- 20 (Philippines) Lloyd Josafat MB
- 21 (Philippines) Louie Ramirez OH
- 25 (Philippines) Ike Andrew Barilea OP

== Pool C ==
=== Foolad Sirjan ===
The following is the roster of the Iranian club Foolad Sirjan in the 2025 AVC Men's Champions League.

Head coach: (Iran) Behrouz Ataei

- 3 (Iran) Ashkan Haghdoust S
- 5 (Cuba) Javier Concepción MB
- 7 (Iran) Esmaeil Mosaferdashliboroun OH
- 8 (Iran) Ahmadreza Shahsavari L
- 9 (France) Earvin N'Gapeth OH
- 10 (Iran) Mohsen Delavari OP
- 11 (Iran) Alireza Abdolhamidi OH
- 12 (Iran) Amirhossein Esfandiar OH
- 13 (Iran) Ali Ramezani S
- 15 (Iran) Amin Khajeh Khalili OH
- 17 (Iran) Ali Hajipour OP
- 19 (Iran) Mehdi Marandi L
- 20 (Iran) Armin Ghelichniazi MB
- 27 (Iran) Mohammad Valizadeh MB

=== Taichung Bank ===
The following is the roster of the Taiwanese club Taichung Bank in the 2025 AVC Men's Champions League.

Head coach: (Chinese Taipei) Huang Hung-yu

- 1 (Chinese Taipei) Chang Yu-chen OH
- 3 (Chinese Taipei) Su Feng-tse L
- 4 (Chinese Taipei) Wen Yi-kai OH
- 5 (Chinese Taipei) Lin Chien S
- 6 (Chinese Taipei) Tseng Mao-tsung OP
- 7 (Chinese Taipei) Chen Jie-ting S
- 8 (Chinese Taipei) Lin Zhi-chuan MB
- 11 (Chinese Taipei) Chen En-de OP
- 12 (Chinese Taipei) Liu Yu-lin OH
- 13 (Chinese Taipei) Hsu Rui-en MB
- 15 (Chinese Taipei) Wang Ping-hsun MB
- 16 (Chinese Taipei) Li Chun-yu MB
- 19 (Chinese Taipei) Chen You-cheng L
- 20 (Chinese Taipei) Li Yuan OH

=== Nakhon Ratchasima QminC ===
The following is the roster of the Thai club Nakhon Ratchasima QminC in the 2025 AVC Men's Champions League.

Head coach: (Thailand) Weeramate Phergsongkror

- 2 (Mongolia) Khangal Tamiraa OP
- 3 (Thailand) Wanchai Tabwises OH
- 7 (Uzbekistan) Azizbek Kuchkorov MB
- 9 (Thailand) Nantawut Taengkrathok MB
- 10 (Thailand) Boonyarid Wongtorn S
- 11 (Indonesia) Doni Haryono OH
- 14 (Thailand) Tanapat Charoensuk L
- 17 (Thailand) Saranchit Charoensuk S
- 21 (Thailand) Thanat Bamrungpakdee OH
- 22 (Thailand) Anurak Phanram OH
- 23 (Thailand) Takorn Chuaymee MB
- 25 (Thailand) Kissada Nilsawai MB
- 88 (Thailand) Montri Puanglib L
- 95 (Thailand) Amorntep Konhan OP

== Pool D ==
=== Al Rayyan ===
The following is the roster of the Qatari club Al Rayyan in the 2025 AVC Men's Champions League.

Head coach: (Brazil) Sergio Cunha

- 1 (Mali) Noumory Keita OH
- 2 (Qatar) Papemaguette Diagne MB
- 3 (Netherlands) Nimir Abdel-Aziz OP
- 5 (Qatar) Miloš Stevanović S
- 6 (Qatar) Ilija Ivović OH
- 7 (Qatar) Belal Nabel Abunabot MB
- 8 (Qatar) André Luiz Queiroz S
- 9 (Qatar) Sulaiman Saad L
- 10 (Brazil) Marcus Vinicius Costa OH
- 11 (Slovenia) Tine Urnaut OH
- 12 (Qatar) Mubarak Dahi OP
- 16 (Qatar) Birama Faye MB
- 19 (Qatar) Abdulmallid Ziad Banelouar OH
- 20 (Qatar) Naji Mahmoud L

=== Sport Center 3 ===
The following is the roster of the Vietnamese national team (under the alias Sport Center 3) in the 2025 AVC Men's Champions League.

Head coach: (Vietnam) Trần Đình Tiền

- 1 (Vietnam) Đinh Văn Duy S
- 2 (Vietnam) Trịnh Duy Phúc L
- 3 (Vietnam) Dương Văn Tiên OH
- 4 (Vietnam) Quản Trọng Nghĩa OH
- 5 (Vietnam) Nguyễn Văn Quốc Duy OH
- 6 (Vietnam) Phạm Văn Hiệp OP
- 7 (Vietnam) Chế Quốc Vô Lít MB
- 8 (Vietnam) Trần Duy Tuyến MB
- 9 (Vietnam) Trương Thế Khải MB
- 12 (Vietnam) Nguyễn Thanh Hải MB
- 13 (Vietnam) Phan Công Đức S
- 17 (Vietnam) Nguyễn Ngọc Thuân OH
- 18 (Vietnam) Phạm Quốc Dư OP
- 23 (Vietnam) Cao Đức Hoàng L

=== Al Muharraq ===
The following is the roster of the Bahraini club Al Muharraq in the 2025 AVC Men's Champions League.

Head coach: (Bahrain) Yaseen Almeel

- 1 (Bahrain) Husain Abdulla OP
- 3 (Bahrain) Mohamed Aldwairi MB
- 4 (Bahrain) Abbas Al Khabbaz MB
- 5 (Bahrain) Mohamed Naser L
- 6 (Bahrain) Sayed Hashem Ali OH
- 7 (Bahrain) Mahmood Alafyah S
- 9 (Portugal) Alexandre Ferreira OH
- 10 (Bahrain) Bader Husain L
- 11 (Bahrain) Mohamed Khalil S
- 12 (Bahrain) Majeed Kadhem OH
- 13 (Bahrain) Ali Alsairafi MB
- 14 (Sweden) Jacob Link OP
- 15 (Bahrain) Naser Anan OH
- 16 (Netherlands) Maarten van Garderen OH
