= 2026 AVC Men's Volleyball Champions League squads =

Squads of the Asian Volleyball Confederation

This article lists the official squads of all clubs participating in the 2026 AVC Men's Volleyball Champions League, held at Ahmad Yani Sports Hall in Pontianak, West Kalimantan, Indonesia, from 13 to 17 May 2026. Eight clubs from seven Asian nations competed in the tournament, which is organised by the Asian Volleyball Confederation (AVC). The official rosters listed below are as registered with the Asian Volleyball Confederation for the competition.

== Squads ==
=== Jakarta Bhayangkara Presisi ===
The following is the official registered squad of the Indonesian club Jakarta Bhayangkara Presisi at the 2026 AVC Men's Volleyball Champions League.

Head coach: (Cuba) Reidel Alfonso Gonzales Toiran

- 7 (Indonesia) Yuda Mardiansyah Putra MB
- 8 (Indonesia) Hernanda Zulfi MB
- 9 (Mali) Noumory Keita OP
- 10 (Indonesia) Raden Ahmad Gumilar MB
- 11 (Indonesia) Rendy Febriant Tamamilang OH
- 13 (Cuba) Robertlandy Simon MB
- 14 (Indonesia) Henry Ade Novian L
- 16 (Indonesia) Alfin Daniel Pratama S
- 19 (Slovenia) Rok Možič OH
- 24 (Indonesia) Agil Angga Anggara OH
- 26 (Indonesia) Farhan Halim OH
- 28 (Indonesia) Arjuna Mahendra OP
- 30 (Indonesia) Nizar Julfikar S
- 31 (Indonesia) Fahreza Rakha Abhinaya L

=== Zhaiyk ===
The following is the official registered squad of the Kazakh club Zhaiyk at the 2026 AVC Men's Volleyball Champions League.

Head coach: (Kazakhstan) Viktor Kozik

- 1 (Kazakhstan) Yevgeniy Gof L
- 4 (Kazakhstan) Amirbek Beksarinov OH
- 5 (Kazakhstan) Boris Kempa OH
- 6 (Kazakhstan) Vitaliy Erdshtein OP
- 7 (Russia) Nikita Alekseev OP
- 9 (Kazakhstan) Vladimir Prokofyev MB
- 10 (Kazakhstan) Sergey Okunev L
- 11 (Kazakhstan) Samgat Salakhiyatov S
- 12 (Kazakhstan) Nodirkhan Kadirkhanov MB
- 13 (Ukraine) Volodymyr Kovalchuk S
- 18 (Kazakhstan) Vitaliy Vorivodin OH
- 22 (Iran) Amirhossein Esfandiar OH
- 27 (Kazakhstan) Aidyn Adilbekov MB
- 52 (Kazakhstan) Klim Ryukhov OH

=== Al-Rayyan Sports Club ===
The following is the official registered squad of the Qatari club Al-Rayyan Sports Club at the 2026 AVC Men's Volleyball Champions League.

Head coach: (Brazil) Carlos Eduardo Schwanke

- 1 (Qatar) Bahatka OH
- 2 (Senegal) Papemaguette Diagne MB
- 3 (Qatar) Saifeddine S
- 6 (Qatar) Azab OH
- 8 (Qatar) Gusson OH
- 9 (Qatar) Sulaiman Saad L
- 13 (Qatar) M. Yasir L
- 16 (Senegal) Birama Faye MB
- 19 (Qatar) Badr OH
- 20 (Russia) Polianskii OH

=== Hyundai Capital Skywalkers ===
The following is the official registered squad of the South Korean club Hyundai Capital Skywalkers at the 2026 AVC Men's Volleyball Champions League.

Head coach: (France) Philippe Blain

- 2 (China) Jiang Chuan OP
- 3 (South Korea) Hwang Seungbin S
- 5 (South Korea) Park Kyeongmin L
- 7 (South Korea) Heo Subong OH
- 10 (South Korea) Kim Jinyeong MB
- 11 (South Korea) Choi Minho MB
- 18 (South Korea) Hong Dongseon OH
- 20 (South Korea) Lee Joonhyeop S
- 23 (South Korea) Lee Seungjun OP
- 30 (South Korea) Hojin OP
- 56 (South Korea) Siwoo OH
- 67 (South Korea) Ahsung L
- 71 (South Korea) Wongeun MB
- 99 (China) Hu Zhangzhong OH

=== JTEKT Stings Aichi ===
The following is the official registered squad of the Japanese club JTEKT Stings Aichi at the 2026 AVC Men's Volleyball Champions League.

Head coach: (Japan) Koichiro Shimbo

- 1 (Chinese Taipei) Yao-Kai Lu Chiang MB
- 2 (Japan) Kentaro Takahashi MB
- 4 (Japan) Shuto Kawaguchi MB
- 6 (Japan) Yudai Kawahigashi S
- 7 (Japan) Takuma Araki L
- 9 (France) Stéphen Boyer OP
- 10 (Japan) Kenya Fujinaka OH
- 11 (Japan) Kosuke Hata OH
- 12 (Japan) Naoya Fujiwara OH
- 17 (Japan) Maeda Issei S
- 21 (Japan) Kazuyuki Takahashi L
- 22 (Japan) Daigo Iwamoto MB
- 23 (United States) TJ DeFalco OH
- 26 (Brazil) Ricardo Lucarelli OH

=== Nakhon Ratchasima 3M Films ===
The following is the official registered squad of the Thai club Nakhon Ratchasima 3M Films at the 2026 AVC Men's Volleyball Champions League.

Head coach: (Thailand) Weeramate Phergsongkror

- 1 (Thailand) Siwadon L
- 2 (Thailand) Prasert MB
- 3 (Thailand) Wanchai Tabwises OH
- 4 (Thailand) Warachot S
- 7 (Uzbekistan) Azizbek Kuchkorov MB
- 8 (Russia) Maksim OP
- 9 (Thailand) Nantawut Taengkrathok MB
- 14 (Thailand) Tanapat Charoensuk L
- 17 (Thailand) Boonyarid Wongtorn S
- 21 (Thailand) Thanat Bamrungpakdee OH
- 22 (Thailand) Anurak Phanram OH
- 25 (Thailand) Kissada Nilsawai MB
- 29 (Thailand) Panya OH
- 95 (Thailand) Amorntep Konhan OP

=== Foolad Sirjan Iranian ===
The following is the official registered squad of the Iranian club Foolad Sirjan Iranian at the 2026 AVC Men's Volleyball Champions League.

Head coach: (Iran) Behrouz Ataei

- 3 (Iran) Ashkan Haghdoust S
- 5 (Iran) Amirhossein Toukhteh MB
- 7 (Iran) Esmaeil Mosaferdashliboroun OH
- 8 (Iran) Rasoul Shahsavari L
- 9 (Iran) Poriya OH
- 11 (Bulgaria) Aleksandar Nikolov OH
- 12 (Iran) Sadati OH
- 13 (Iran) Ali Ramezani S
- 15 (Iran) Amin Khajeh Khalili OH
- 16 (Iran) A. Shafiei MB
- 17 (Iran) Ali Hajipour OP
- 19 (Iran) Mehdi Marandi L
- 27 (Iran) Mohammad Valizadeh MB

=== Jakarta Garuda Jaya ===
The following is the official registered squad of the Indonesian club Jakarta Garuda Jaya at the 2026 AVC Men's Volleyball Champions League.

Head coach: (Indonesia) Ibarsjah Djanu Tjahjono

- 1 (Cuba) Lyvan Taboada Diaz S
- 2 (Indonesia) Putra Bagus Hidayat MB
- 5 (Indonesia) Dawuda Alaihimassalam OP
- 7 (Indonesia) Hilarius Galang Bryantama Putra S
- 8 (Indonesia) Zaki Hasan Maulana MB
- 11 (Indonesia) Tedi Oka Syahputra MB
- 12 (Indonesia) Muhammad Reyhan L
- 14 (Indonesia) Raihan Rizky Attorif L
- 16 (Indonesia) Krisna OH
- 17 (Russia) Timofei Sokolov OH
- 18 (Indonesia) Agustino MB
- 21 (Indonesia) Muhammad Haikal Hidayatullah OH
- 22 (Indonesia) Muhammad Shafa Pandya OH
- 25 (Indonesia) Fauzan Nibras OP
