= 2026 AVC Men's Volleyball Champions League =

Volleyball competition held in Indonesia

Tournament details
- Host country: Indonesia
- City: Pontianak
- Dates: 13–17 May 2026
- Teams: 8
- Venue: 1 (in 1 host city)

Final positions
- Champions: (Indonesia) Jakarta Bhayangkara Presisi (1st title)
- Runners-up: (Iran) Foolad Sirjan Iranian
- Third place: (Japan) JTEKT Stings Aichi
- Fourth place: (South Korea) Hyundai Capital Skywalkers

Tournament awards
- MVP: (Mali) Noumory Keita
- Best Setter: (Iran) Ali Ramezani
- Best OH: (Iran) Poriya Hossein Khanzadeh; (Bulgaria) Aleksandar Nikolov
- Best MB: (Cuba) Robertlandy Simón; (Indonesia) Ahmad Gumilar
- Best OPP: (Mali) Noumory Keita
- Best Libero: (Japan) Kazuyuki Takahashi

Tournament statistics
- Matches played: 8
- Attendance: 27,075 (3,384 per match)

The 2026 AVC Men's Volleyball Champions League was the second edition of the AVC Men's Volleyball Champions League and the 26th overall edition of the formerly named Asian Men's Club Volleyball Championship, an annual international men's volleyball club tournament organized by the Asian Volleyball Confederation (AVC). It was held at the Ahmad Yani Integrated Sports Hall in Pontianak, West Kalimantan, Indonesia from 13 to 17 May 2026.

Unlike the 2025 edition which featured 12 teams in a pool-play format, the 2026 edition featured eight teams competing in a direct knockout format, starting from the quarterfinals. Both finalists will qualify for the 2026 FIVB Volleyball Men's Club World Championship.

Jakarta Bhayangkara Presisi won the tournament, defeating Foolad Sirjan Iranian 3–1 in the final, becoming the first Indonesian club to win the AVC Men's Champions League title.

== Host selection ==
In December 2025, the AVC announced that Indonesia would host the 2026 AVC Men's Champions League in Pontianak, West Kalimantan. The drawing of lots took place on 15 March 2026 at Le Méridien in Jakarta.

== Participating teams ==
A maximum of eight teams qualified for the AVC Men's Volleyball Champions League, featuring one automatic berth for the host nation and five spots for the champions of each zonal tournament. In the event that a zonal tournament was not held, that specific vacancy—along with any other remaining slots—was distributed as a wild card. The following eight teams qualified for the tournament, listed by the method of qualification.

Country	Zone	Qualified as	Qualified on	Previous appearances			Previous best performance
Country	Zone	Qualified as	Qualified on	Total	First	Last	Previous best performance
(Indonesia) Jakarta Bhayangkara Presisi	SAVA	Host country	20 December 2025	0	None		Debut
(Kazakhstan) Zhaiyk	CAVA	2025 CAVA Champions League	23 July 2025	0	None		Debut
(Qatar) Al-Rayyan Sports Club	WAVA	2026 WAVA Club Championship	15 February 2026	1	2025		Champions (2025)
(Iran) Foolad Sirjan Iranian	CAVA	Wild card	15 March 2026	1	2025		4th place (2025)
(Japan) JTEKT Stings Aichi	EAVA	Wild card	15 March 2026	0	None		Debut
(South Korea) Hyundai Capital Skywalkers	EAVA	Wild card	15 March 2026	0	None		Debut
(Indonesia) Jakarta Garuda Jaya	SAVA	Wild card	15 March 2026	0	None		Debut
(Thailand) Nakhon Ratchasima 3M Films	SAVA	Wild card	15 March 2026	1	2025		5th place (2025)

== Venues ==
The tournament is hosted entirely in Pontianak, the capital of West Kalimantan province, Indonesia.

Venue	2026 AVC Men's Volleyball Champions League (West Kalimantan)
Pontianak	2026 AVC Men's Volleyball Champions League (West Kalimantan)
Ahmad Yani Sports Hall	2026 AVC Men's Volleyball Champions League (West Kalimantan)
Capacity: 5,000	2026 AVC Men's Volleyball Champions League (West Kalimantan)

== Format ==
Unlike the 2025 edition which used a preliminary round pool play system, the 2026 edition uses a direct knockout format starting from the quarterfinals. The four quarterfinals were played on 13–14 May, with the semifinals scheduled for 16 May and the medal matches on 17 May 2026.

== Final round ==
- All times are West Indonesia Time (UTC+07:00).

Quarterfinals
13 May
(Indonesia) Jakarta Bhayangkara Presisi	3
(Kazakhstan) Zhaiyk	1
13 May
(Qatar) Al-Rayyan Sports Club	1
(South Korea) Hyundai Capital Skywalkers	3
14 May
(Japan) JTEKT Stings Aichi	3
(Thailand) Nakhon Ratchasima 3M Films	0
14 May
(Iran) Foolad Sirjan Iranian	3
(Indonesia) Jakarta Garuda Jaya	0

Semifinals
16 May
(Indonesia) Jakarta Bhayangkara Presisi	3
(South Korea) Hyundai Capital Skywalkers	0
16 May
(Japan) JTEKT Stings Aichi	0
(Iran) Foolad Sirjan Iranian	3

Final
17 May
(Indonesia) Jakarta Bhayangkara Presisi	3
(Iran) Foolad Sirjan Iranian	1
3rd place match
17 May
(South Korea) Hyundai Capital Skywalkers	0
(Japan) JTEKT Stings Aichi	3

=== Quarterfinals ===
Date	Time		Score		Set 1	Set 2	Set 3	Set 4	Set 5	Total	Report
13 May	15:00	Jakarta Bhayangkara Presisi (Indonesia)	3–1	(Kazakhstan) Zhaiyk	25–19	25–27	25–19	25–21		100–86	Report
13 May	19:00	Al-Rayyan Sports Club (Qatar)	1–3	(South Korea) Hyundai Capital Skywalkers	20–25	20–25	25–21	21–25		86–96	Report
14 May	15:00	JTEKT Stings Aichi (Japan)	3–0	(Thailand) Nakhon Ratchasima 3M Films	25–20	25–14	25–18			75–52	Report
14 May	19:00	Foolad Sirjan Iranian (Iran)	3–0	(Indonesia) Jakarta Garuda Jaya	25–14	25–12	25–12			75–38	Report

=== Semifinals ===
Date	Time		Score		Set 1	Set 2	Set 3	Set 4	Set 5	Total	Report
16 May	15:00	JTEKT Stings Aichi (Japan)	0–3	(Iran) Foolad Sirjan Iranian	22–25	19–25	20–25			61–75	Report
16 May	19:00	Jakarta Bhayangkara Presisi (Indonesia)	3–0	(South Korea) Hyundai Capital Skywalkers	25–23	27–25	25–23			77–71	Report

=== 3rd place match ===
Date	Time		Score		Set 1	Set 2	Set 3	Set 4	Set 5	Total	Report
17 May	15:00	Hyundai Capital Skywalkers (South Korea)	0–3	(Japan) JTEKT Stings Aichi	19–25	19–25	21–25			59–75	Report

=== Final ===
Date	Time		Score		Set 1	Set 2	Set 3	Set 4	Set 5	Total	Report
17 May	19:00	Jakarta Bhayangkara Presisi (Indonesia)	3–1	(Iran) Foolad Sirjan Iranian	25–20	24–26	25–23	25–23		99–92	Report

Match details

- Date: 17 May 2026
- Time: 19:00–21:09 WIB (UTC+07:00)
- Duration: 2 hours 9 minutes (set durations: 0:24, 0:28, 0:30, 0:32)
- Venue: Ahmad Yani Sports Hall, Pontianak, West Kalimantan, Indonesia
- Attendance: 5,237
- Referees: Wensheng Luo (CHN), Jae-Hyo Choi (KOR)
- Challenge referee: Ismail Ibrahim Alblooshi (UAE)

== Final standing ==
Rank	Team
1st place, gold medalist(s)	(Indonesia) Jakarta Bhayangkara Presisi
2nd place, silver medalist(s)	(Iran) Foolad Sirjan Iranian
3rd place, bronze medalist(s)	(Japan) JTEKT Stings Aichi
4	(South Korea) Hyundai Capital Skywalkers
5	(Qatar) Al-Rayyan Sports Club
6	(Kazakhstan) Zhaiyk
7	(Thailand) Nakhon Ratchasima 3M Films
8	(Indonesia) Jakarta Garuda Jaya

Qualified for the 2026 Club World Championship

2026 AVC Men's Champions League champions
(Indonesia)
Jakarta Bhayangkara Presisi
First title

14–man roster
Yuda Mardiansyah Putra, Hernanda Zulfi, Noumory Keita, Raden Ahmad Gumilar, Rendy Febriant Tamamilang, Robertlandy Simon, Henry Ade Novian, Alfin Daniel Pratama, Rok Možič, Agil Angga Anggara, Farhan Halim, Arjuna Mahendra, Nizar Julfikar, Fahreza Rakha Abhinaya
Head coach
(Cuba) Reidel Alfonso Gonzales Toiran

== Awards ==
- Most Valuable Player

Noumory Keita (MLI) (Jakarta Bhayangkara Presisi)

- Best Setter

Ali Ramezani (IRI) (Foolad Sirjan Iranian)

- Best Outside Spikers

Poriya Hossein Khanzadeh (IRI) (Foolad Sirjan Iranian)
Aleksandar Nikolov (BUL) (Foolad Sirjan Iranian)

- Best Middle Blockers

Robertlandy Simón (CUB) (Jakarta Bhayangkara Presisi)
Ahmad Gumilar (INA) (Jakarta Bhayangkara Presisi)

- Best Opposite Spiker

Noumory Keita (MLI) (Jakarta Bhayangkara Presisi)

- Best Libero

Kazuyuki Takahashi (JPN) (JTEKT Stings Aichi)

== Statistical leaders ==
Statistics sourced from Volleyball World.

Category	Player	Club	Total
Best scorer	Noumory Keita (9)	(Indonesia) Jakarta Bhayangkara Presisi	90
Best attacker	Noumory Keita (9)	(Indonesia) Jakarta Bhayangkara Presisi	76
Best blocker	Robertlandy Simon (13)	(Indonesia) Jakarta Bhayangkara Presisi	8
Best server	Poriya Khanzadeh (9)	(Iran) Foolad Sirjan Iranian	11
Best receiver	Farhan Halim (26)	(Indonesia) Jakarta Bhayangkara Presisi	33
Best setter	Ali Ramezani (13)	(Iran) Foolad Sirjan Iranian	55
Best digger	Kazuyuki Takahashi (21)	(Japan) JTEKT Stings Aichi	20

== See also ==
- 2026 AVC Women's Volleyball Champions League
- 2026 AVC Men's Volleyball Champions League squads
