= Murat Yenipazar =

Turkish volleyball player (born 1993)

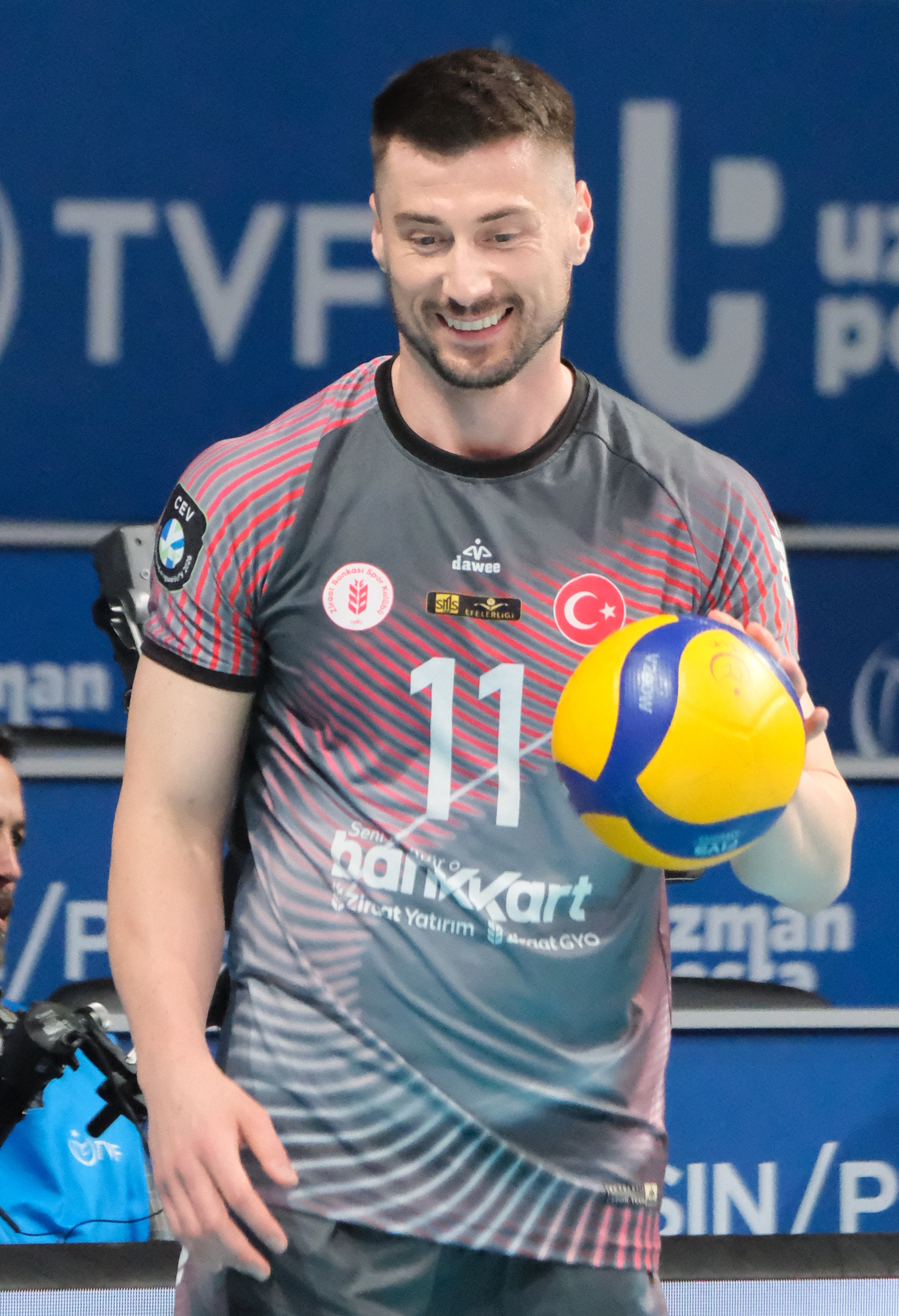
- Yenipazar in 2026

Personal information
- Full name: Murat Yenipazar
- Born: 1 January 1993 (age 33); Yenipazar, Turkey
- Height: 1.93 m (6 ft 4 in)
- Weight: 74 kg (163 lb)
- Spike: 339 cm (133 in)
- Block: 322 cm (127 in)

Volleyball information
- Position: Setter
- Current club: Galatasaray
- Number: 10

Career
Years
- 2010–2016
- 2013–2014
- 2015–2016
- 2016–2017
- 2017–2019
- 2019–2020
- 2020–2022
- 2022–
Teams
- İstanbul BB
- Altınordu
- Adana BYZ Algomed
- Hypo Tirol Innsbruck
- İstanbul BB
- Arhavi Spor Kulübü
- Galatasaray
- VC Barkom-Kazhany

National team
2012–	Turkey
Honours
Men's volleyball
Representing Turkey
European League
Silver medal – second place	2012 Ankara

Murat Yenipazar (born 1 January 1993) is a Turkish volleyball player.

== Club career ==
On 13 August 2020, Galatasaray HDI Sigorta Men's Volleyball Team signed a 2-year contract with experienced setter Yenipazar.

== National team career ==
Yenipazar plays for the Turkey men's junior national team and Turkey national team. He took part also in the boys' youth national team.

At the 2012 Men's European Volleyball League, he won the silver medal with the Turkey national team.

== Awards ==
=== Individual ===
- 2013 FIVB Volleyball Men's U21 World Championship "Best Setter"

=== National team ===
- 2021 Men's European Volleyball League – Gold medal
- 2012 Men's European Volleyball League – Silver medal
