= Bahraini Women's Volleyball League =

- Current season, competition or edition: 2025–26 Bahraini League
- Sport: Volleyball
- First season: 2026; 0 years ago
- Administrator: BVA, GSAB
- No. of teams: 8 teams
- Country: Bahrain
- Confederation: AVC
- Continent: Asia
- Most recent champion: Bahrain Spikers Academy (1st title) (2025–26)
- Most titles: Bahrain Spikers Academy (1 title)
- Level on pyramid: Level 1
- Relegation to: National 2
- Domestic cups: Bahrain Emir Cup; Bahrain Crown Cup
- International cups: AVC Champions League; Arab Clubs Championship

The Bahraini Women's Volleyball League, officially known as the Takafoa Women's Volleyball League, in ( Arabic : دوري تكافئ للكرة الطائرة للسيدات ) is the premier women's volleyball competition in Bahrain. Organized by the General Sports Authority of the Kingdom of Bahrain alongside the Bahrain Volleyball Association, the league was established in 2026 with the participation of eight teams from sports clubs, universities, and volleyball academies. The inaugural season was held from 14 May to 14 June 2026, culminating in Bahrain Spikers Academy winning the first league title, Sportsista comes second, while the University of Bahrain finished in third place.

== Titles by Clubs ==
Titles by club
Rank	Club	Titles	Runners-up	Last title
1	Bahrain Spikers Academy	1	0	2025–26
2	Sportsista	0	1	—
3	University of Bahrain	0	0	—

== Winners list ==
Season	Champions	Runners-up	Third place
2025/26	Bahrain Spikers Academy	Sportsista	University of Bahrain

Sources :
