= Thomas Koelewijn =

Dutch volleyball player (born 1988)

Personal information
- Nationality: Dutch
- Born: 18 December 1988 (age 37) Kampen, Netherlands
- Height: 2.06 m (6 ft 9 in)
- Weight: 100 kg (220 lb)
- Spike: 360 cm (142 in)
- Block: 350 cm (138 in)

Volleyball information
- Position: Middle blocker
- Current club: Montpellier UC
- Number: 15

Career
- Years: Team
- 2012–2014 2014–2015 2015–2016 2016–: VC Antwerpen; Arago de Sete; Indykpol AZS Olsztyn; Montpellier UC

National team
- Years: Team
- 2012–: Netherlands
Honours
Men's volleyball
Representing Netherlands
European League
Gold medal – first place	2012 Turkey
- Updated on 31 January 2017

Thomas Koelewijn (born 18 December 1988) is a Dutch volleyball player, a member of Netherlands men's national volleyball team and French club Montpellier UC.

== Career ==
With his national team he achieved gold medal of 2012 European League. In 2015 he moved to Polish club Indykpol AZS Olsztyn. After season he went to French team Montpellier UC.

== Sporting achievements ==
=== Clubs ===
- 2013/2014 Belgium Cup 2014, with VC Antwerpen
- 2013/2014 Belgium Championship, with VC Antwerpen

=== National team ===
- 2012 European League
