= 2025 AVC Men's Volleyball Champions League =

Volleyball competition held in Japan

- Official logo

Tournament details
- Host country: Japan
- Cities: Hirakata; Kyoto
- Dates: 11–18 May 2025
- Teams: 12
- Venue: 2 (in 2 host cities)

Final positions
- Champions: (Qatar) Al-Rayyan Sports Club (1st title)
- Runners-up: (Japan) Osaka Bluteon
- Third place: (Japan) Suntory Sunbirds Osaka
- Fourth place: (Iran) Foolad Sirjan Iranian

Tournament awards
- MVP: (Netherlands) Nimir Abdel-Aziz
- Best Setter: (Qatar) Miloš Stevanović
- Best OH: (Cuba) Miguel Ángel López; (Japan) Ran Takahashi
- Best MB: (Qatar) Papemaguette Diagne; (Japan) Larry Evbade-Dan
- Best OPP: (Netherlands) Nimir Abdel-Aziz
- Best Libero: (Japan) Tomohiro Yamamoto

Tournament statistics
- Matches played: 20
- Attendance: 26,118 (1,306 per match)

The 2025 AVC Men's Volleyball Champions League was the first edition of the newly rebranded AVC Men's Volleyball Champions League and the 25th overall edition of the formerly named Asian Men's Club Volleyball Championship, an annual international men's volleyball club tournament organized by the Asian Volleyball Confederation (AVC) with the Japan Volleyball Association (JVA) and the SV.League (SVL). It was held at the Panasonic Arena in Hirakata and Shimadzu Arena Kyoto in Kyoto from 11 to 18 May 2025.

Al-Rayyan Sports Club won the tournament for the first time by beating Osaka Bluteon in the final and Nimir Abdel-Aziz named the MVP. Both teams qualified for the 2025 FIVB Men's Volleyball Club World Championship. Suntory Sunbirds Osaka claimed the bronze against Foolad Sirjan in the 3rd place match.

== Host selection ==
In February 2025, JVA announced that Japan would be the host nation of the tournament.

== Participating teams ==
=== Teams by zonal association ===
Central Asia (CAVA)	East Asia (EAVA)	Oceania (OZVA)	Southeast Asia (SAVA)	West Asia (WAVA)
Iran; Kazakhstan	China; Chinese Taipei; Japan (hosts)	Australia	Philippines; Thailand; Vietnam	Bahrain; Qatar

=== Entrant teams ===
The first AVC Men's Champions League is an invitational tournament with a maximum of twelve teams allowed to enter. As hosts, Japan was allowed to enter two teams. The following teams are expected to take part in tournament.

Association	Team	Domestic league standing
Australia	Queensland Pirates	2024–25 Australian Men's Volleyball League champions
Bahrain	Muharraq Club	2024–25 Bahraini Men's Volleyball League champions
China	Shanghai Bright	2024–25 Chinese Volleyball Super League champions
Chinese Taipei	Taichung Bank	N/A
Iran	Foolad Sirjan Iranian	2024–25 Iranian Volleyball Super League champions
Japan	Suntory Sunbirds Osaka	2023–24 V.League Division 1 champions
Japan	Osaka Bluteon	2023–24 V.League Division 1 runners-up
Kazakhstan	Aqtobe VC	2024–25 Kazakhstan Men's National League runners-up
Philippines	Cignal HD Spikers	N/A (national team) (Note: Philippine national team competing under the name 'Cignal HD Spikers', which shares the same name as the Cignal HD Spikers, the 2024 Spiker's Turf Invitational Conference champions. This is a result of an approved request by the Philippine National Volleyball Federation to the AVC and is part of the national team's preparation for the 2025 FIVB Men's Volleyball World Championship which the Philippines will be hosting.)
Qatar	Al-Rayyan Sports Club	2024–25 Qatari Volleyball League champions
Thailand	Nakhon Ratchasima Qmin C VC	2023–24 Men's Volleyball Thailand League champions
Vietnam	Sport Training Center 3	N/A (national team) (Note: Vietnam national team replaced Biên Phòng, the 2024 Volleyball Vietnam League champions.)

== Squads ==
With the rebranded tournament, each team can now have a maximum of three foreign players in its roster that can play at any time. Previously, teams can only have two foreign players and only one of which can play at a time.

== Pools composition ==
The teams were split into four pools with three teams each. The draw of lots took place at The Grand Fourwings Hotel Bangkokon on 12 March 2025.

Teams were seeded in the first position of each pool following the serpentine system according to their FIVB Senior World Rankings as of 8 January 2025. All teams not seeded were drawn to take other available positions in the remaining lines, following the World Ranking. The host's two teams and the top two countries are automatically seeded as the first teams of the four pools.

Seeded teams	Pot 1	Pot 2
(Japan) Suntory Sunbirds Osaka (6) (H-A) (Japan) Osaka Bluteon (6) (H-B) (Iran) Iranian Team (Note: The identity of the team from Iran was yet to be determined at the time of the draw. This slot was later filled in by Foolad Sirjan.) (15) (Qatar) Al-Rayyan Sports Club (21)	(China) Shanghai Bright (24) (Australia) Queensland Pirates (33) (Chinese Taipei) Taichung Bank (45) (Vietnam) Sport Training Center 3 (52)	(Kazakhstan) Aqtobe VC (53) (Philippines) Cignal HD Spikers (56) (Thailand) Nakhon Ratchasima QminC (57) (Bahrain) Bahraini Team (Note: The identity of the team from Bahrain was yet to be determined at the time of the draw. This slot was later filled in by Al Muharraq.) (58)

Drawing results

Pool A	Pool B	Pool C	Pool D
(Japan) Suntory Sunbirds Osaka (6) (H-A)	(Japan) Osaka Bluteon (6) (H-B)	(Iran) Iranian Team (15)	(Qatar) Al-Rayyan Sports Club (21)
(Australia) Queensland Pirates (33)	(China) Shanghai Bright (24)	(Chinese Taipei) Taichung Bank (45)	(Vietnam) Sport Training Center 3 (52)
(Kazakhstan) Aqtobe VC (53)	(Philippines) Cignal HD Spikers (56)	(Thailand) Nakhon Ratchasima Qmin C VC (57)	(Bahrain) Bahraini Team (58)

== Venues ==
The tournament is hosted in Hirakata and Kyoto in the Kansai region.

Preliminary round	Final round	2025 AVC Men's Volleyball Champions League (Kansai region)
Hirakata	Kyoto	2025 AVC Men's Volleyball Champions League (Kansai region)
Panasonic Arena	Shimadzu Arena Kyoto	2025 AVC Men's Volleyball Champions League (Kansai region)
Capacity: 2,200	Capacity: 8,635	2025 AVC Men's Volleyball Champions League (Kansai region)

== Pool standing procedure ==
1. Total number of victories (matches won, matches lost)
2. In the event of a tie, the following first tiebreaker will apply: The teams will be ranked by the most point gained per match as follows:
  - Match won 3–0 or 3–1: 3 points for the winner, 0 points for the loser
  - Match won 3–2: 2 points for the winner, 1 point for the loser
  - Match forfeited: 3 points for the winner, 0 points (0–25, 0–25, 0–25) for the loser
3. If teams are still tied after examining the number of victories and points gained, then the AVC will examine the results in order to break the tie in the following order:
  - Set quotient: if two or more teams are tied on the number of points gained, they will be ranked by the quotient resulting from the division of the number of all set won by the number of all sets lost.
  - Points quotient: if the tie persists based on the set quotient, the teams will be ranked by the quotient resulting from the division of all points scored by the total of points lost during all sets.
  - If the tie persists based on the point quotient, the tie will be broken based on the team that won the match of the Round Robin Phase between the tied teams. When the tie in point quotient is between three or more teams, these teams ranked taking into consideration only the matches involving the teams in question.

== Preliminary round ==
- All times are Japan Standard Time (UTC+09:00).

=== Pool A ===
Pos	Team	Pld	W	L	Pts	SW	SL	SR	SPW	SPL	SPR	Qualification
1	(Japan) Suntory Sunbirds Osaka (H)	2	2	0	6	6	0	MAX	150	95	1.579	Quarterfinals
2	(Kazakhstan) Aqtobe VC	2	1	1	3	3	3	1.000	124	120	1.033	Quarterfinals
3	(Australia) Queensland Pirates	2	0	2	0	0	6	0.000	91	150	0.607	

Source: FIVB Live Center
(H) Host

Date	Time		Score		Set 1	Set 2	Set 3	Set 4	Set 5	Total	Report
11 May	19:05	Suntory Sunbirds Osaka (Japan)	3–0	(Australia) Queensland Pirates	25–12	25–16	25–18			75–46	P2 Report
12 May	15:05	Aqtobe VC (Kazakhstan)	3–0	(Australia) Queensland Pirates	25–11	25–15	25–19			75–45	P2 Report
13 May	19:05	Suntory Sunbirds Osaka (Japan)	3–0	(Kazakhstan) Aqtobe VC	25–14	25–16	25–19			75–49	P2 Report

=== Pool B ===
Pos	Team	Pld	W	L	Pts	SW	SL	SR	SPW	SPL	SPR	Qualification
1	(Japan) Osaka Bluteon (H)	2	2	0	6	6	0	MAX	150	107	1.402	Quarterfinals
2	(China) Shanghai Bright	2	1	1	3	3	3	1.000	129	126	1.024	Quarterfinals
3	(Philippines) Cignal HD Spikers	2	0	2	0	0	6	0.000	104	150	0.693	

Source: FIVB Live Center
(H) Host

Date	Time		Score		Set 1	Set 2	Set 3	Set 4	Set 5	Total	Report
11 May	15:35	Osaka Bluteon (Japan)	3–0	(Philippines) Cignal HD Spikers	25–11	25–21	25–21			75–53	P2 Report
12 May	19:05	Osaka Bluteon (Japan)	3–0	(China) Shanghai Bright	25–20	25–14	25–20			75–54	P2 Report
13 May	15:05	Cignal HD Spikers (Philippines)	0–3	(China) Shanghai Bright	12–25	21–25	18–25			51–75	Report

=== Pool C ===
Pos	Team	Pld	W	L	Pts	SW	SL	SR	SPW	SPL	SPR	Qualification
1	(Iran) Foolad Sirjan Iranian	2	2	0	5	6	2	3.000	181	139	1.302	Quarterfinals
2	(Thailand) Nakhon Ratchasima Qmin C VC	2	1	1	4	5	4	1.250	196	192	1.021	Quarterfinals
3	(Chinese Taipei) Taichung Bank	2	0	2	0	1	6	0.167	130	176	0.739	

Source: FIVB Live Center

Date	Time		Score		Set 1	Set 2	Set 3	Set 4	Set 5	Total	Report
11 May	10:05	Foolad Sirjan Iranian (Iran)	3–2	(Thailand) Nakhon Ratchasima Qmin C VC	25–17	22–25	25–17	19–25	15–11	106–95	P2 Report
12 May	10:05	Taichung Bank (Chinese Taipei)	1–3	(Thailand) Nakhon Ratchasima Qmin C VC	18–25	20–25	28–26	20–25		86–101	P2 Report
13 May	10:05	Foolad Sirjan Iranian (Iran)	3–0	(Chinese Taipei) Taichung Bank	25–17	25–14	25–13			75–44	P2 Report

=== Pool D ===
Pos	Team	Pld	W	L	Pts	SW	SL	SR	SPW	SPL	SPR	Qualification
1	(Qatar) Al-Rayyan Sports Club	2	2	0	6	6	0	MAX	150	104	1.442	Quarterfinals
2	(Bahrain) Muharraq Club	2	1	1	3	3	4	0.750	152	166	0.916	Quarterfinals
3	(Vietnam) Sport Training Center 3	2	0	2	0	1	6	0.167	138	170	0.812	

Source: FIVB Live Center

Date	Time		Score		Set 1	Set 2	Set 3	Set 4	Set 5	Total	Report
11 May	12:35	Al-Rayyan Sports Club (Qatar)	3–0	(Bahrain) Muharraq Club	25–22	25–17	25–18			75–57	P2 Report
12 May	12:35	Sport Training Center 3 (Vietnam)	1–3	(Bahrain) Muharraq Club	21–25	25–20	23–25	22–25		91–95	P2 Report
13 May	12:35	Al-Rayyan Sports Club (Qatar)	3–0	(Vietnam) Sport Training Center 3	25–11	25–15	25–21			75–47	P2 Report

== Final round ==
- All times are Japan Standard Time (UTC+09:00).

Quarterfinals
15 May
(Japan) Suntory Sunbirds Osaka	3
(Bahrain) Muharraq Club	0
15 May
(Kazakhstan) Aqtobe VC	1
(Qatar) Al-Rayyan Sports Club	3
16 May
(Japan) Osaka Bluteon	3
(Thailand) Nakhon Ratchasima Qmin C VC	1
16 May
(China) Shanghai Bright	1
(Iran) Foolad Sirjan Iranian	3

Semifinals
17 May
(Japan) Suntory Sunbirds Osaka	2
(Qatar) Al-Rayyan Sports Club	3
17 May
(Japan) Osaka Bluteon	3
(Iran) Foolad Sirjan Iranian	1

Final
18 May
(Qatar) Al-Rayyan Sports Club	3
(Japan) Osaka Bluteon	0
3rd place match
18 May
(Japan) Suntory Sunbirds Osaka	3
(Iran) Foolad Sirjan Iranian	0

=== Quarterfinals ===
Date	Time		Score		Set 1	Set 2	Set 3	Set 4	Set 5	Total	Report
15 May	15:05	Aqtobe VC (Kazakhstan)	1–3	(Qatar) Al-Rayyan Sports Club	20–25	18–25	25–23	20–25		83–98	P2 Report
15 May	19:05	Suntory Sunbirds Osaka (Japan)	3–0	(Bahrain) Muharraq Club	27–25	25–20	25–9			77–54	P2 Report
16 May	15:05	Shanghai Bright (China)	1–3	(Iran) Foolad Sirjan Iranian	26–24	21–25	26–28	23–25		96–102	P2 Report
16 May	19:05	Osaka Bluteon (Japan)	3–1	(Thailand) Nakhon Ratchasima Qmin C VC	25–18	21–25	25–17	25–15		96–75	P2 Report

=== Semifinals ===
Date	Time		Score		Set 1	Set 2	Set 3	Set 4	Set 5	Total	Report
17 May	12:05	Suntory Sunbirds Osaka (Japan)	2–3	(Qatar) Al-Rayyan Sports Club	25–22	22–25	25–23	23–25	15–17	110–112	P2 Report
17 May	16:05	Osaka Bluteon (Japan)	3–1	(Iran) Foolad Sirjan Iranian	25–19	19–25	25–18	25–19		94–81	P2 Report

=== 3rd place match ===
Date	Time		Score		Set 1	Set 2	Set 3	Set 4	Set 5	Total	Report
18 May	12:05	Suntory Sunbirds Osaka (Japan)	3–0	(Iran) Foolad Sirjan Iranian	25–15	25–15	25–19			75–49	P2 Report

=== Final ===
Date	Time		Score		Set 1	Set 2	Set 3	Set 4	Set 5	Total	Report
18 May	16:05	Al-Rayyan Sports Club (Qatar)	3–0	(Japan) Osaka Bluteon	25–19	25–22	25–17			75–58	P2 Report

== Final standing ==
Rank	Team
1st place, gold medalist(s)	(Qatar) Al-Rayyan Sports Club
2nd place, silver medalist(s)	(Japan) Osaka Bluteon
3rd place, bronze medalist(s)	(Japan) Suntory Sunbirds Osaka
4	(Iran) Foolad Sirjan Iranian
5	(Kazakhstan) Aqtobe VC
5	(Bahrain) Muharraq Club
5	(Thailand) Nakhon Ratchasima Qmin C VC
5	(China) Shanghai Bright
9	(Philippines) Cignal HD Spikers
9	(Australia) Queensland Pirates
9	(Vietnam) Sport Training Center 3
9	(Chinese Taipei) Taichung Bank

Qualified for the 2025 Club World Championship

2025 AVC Men's Champions League champions
(Qatar)
Al-Rayyan Sports Club
First title

14–man roster
Noumory Keita, Papemaguette Diagne, Nimir Abdel-Aziz, Miloš Stevanović, Ilija Ivović, Belal Nabel Abunabot, André Luiz Queiroz, Sulaiman Saad, Marcus Vinicius Costa, Tine Urnaut, Mubarak Dahi (c), Birama Faye, Abdulmallid Ziad Banelouar, Naji Mahmoud
Head coach
(Brazil) Sergio Cunha

== Awards ==
- Most Valuable Player

Nimir Abdel-Aziz (NED) (Al-Rayyan Sports Club)

- Best Setter

Miloš Stevanović (QAT) (Al-Rayyan Sports Club)

- Best Outside Spikers

Miguel Ángel López (CUB) (Osaka Bluteon)
Ran Takahashi (JPN) (Suntory Sunbirds Osaka)

- Best Middle Blockers

Papemaguette Diagne (QAT) (Al-Rayyan Sports Club)
Larry Evbade-Dan (JPN) (Osaka Bluteon)

- Best Opposite Spiker

Nimir Abdel-Aziz (NED) (Al-Rayyan Sports Club)

- Best Libero

Tomohiro Yamamoto (JPN) (Osaka Bluteon)

== See also ==
- 2025 AVC Women's Volleyball Champions League
