= 2013–14 Men's Volleyball Thailand League =

- League: Volleyball Thailand League
- Sport: Volleyball
- Duration: December 25, 2013 – May 3, 2014
- Number of games: 56 (Regular Season)
- Number of teams: 8
- Season champions: Nakhon Ratchasima (3rd title)
- Season MVP: Wanchai Tabwises

Men's Volleyball Thailand League seasons
- ← 2012–13 2014–15 →

The Volleyball Thailand League is the highest level of Thailand club volleyball in the 2013–14 season and the 9th edition.

== Team ==
- Cosmo Chiangrai
- Chonburi
- Krungkao
- Nakhon Ratchasima
- Kasetsart
- Pibulsongkram Phitsanulok
- Suandusit
- Maejo U. Thai-Denmark

== Regular season ==
=== Ranking ===
Pos	Team	Pld	W	L	Pts	SW	SL	SR	SPW	SPL	SPR
1	Nakhon Ratchasima	14	13	1	39	41	10	4.100	1240	1001	1.239
2	Chonburi	14	12	2	35	37	9	4.111	1104	906	1.219
3	Suandusit	13	9	4	27	30	22	1.364	1166	1150	1.014
4	Kasesart	13	8	5	25	31	26	1.192	1264	1239	1.020
5	Krungkao	14	7	7	20	27	28	0.964	1234	1228	1.005
6	Cosmo Chiangrai	14	5	9	14	20	29	0.690	1071	1155	0.927
7	Pibulsongkram Phitsanulok	14	1	13	4	9	39	0.231	921	1157	0.796
8	Maejo U. Thai-Denmark	14	1	13	4	8	40	0.200	981	1145	0.857

=== Round 1 ===
Date	Time		Score		Set 1	Set 2	Set 3	Set 4	Set 5	Total
25 Dec	14:00	Nakhon Ratchasima	3–0	Pibulsongkram Phitsanulok	25–20	25–15	25–21			75–56
25 Dec	18:00	Kasetsart	3–1	Krungkao	25–27	26–24	21–25	25–15		99–89
28 Dec	14:00	Kasetsart	2–3	Suandusit	23–25	25–15	25–14	22–25	10–15	105–94
28 Dec	14:30	Cosmo Chiangrai	0–3	Chonburi	17–25	19–25	24–26			60–76
28 Dec	18:00	Maejo U. Thai-Denmark	0–3	Nakhon Ratchasima	18–25	20–25	13–25			51–75
25 Jan	15:00	Suandusit	3–0	Maejo U. Thai-Denmark	25–14	25–16	25–21			75–57
25 Jan	17:00	Nakhon Ratchasima	2–3	Kasetsart	25–14	25–16	22–25	23–25	13–15	108–95
26 Jan	15:00	Pibulsongkram Phitsanulok	0–3	Cosmo Chiangrai	23–25	21–25	17–25			64–75
26 Jan	16:00	Chonburi	3–0	Krungkao	25–22	25–16	25–21			75–59
01 Feb	14:30	Cosmo Chiangrai	3–0	Maejo U. Thai-Denmark	25–23	25–20	27–25			77–68
01 Feb	15:00	Krungkao	1–3	Suandusit	20–25	20–25	25–21	18–25		83–96
02 Feb	16:00	Chonburi	3–0	Pibulsongkram Phitsanulok	25–18	25–15	25–16			75–49
08 Feb	15:00	Pibulsongkram Phitsanulok	2–3	Krungkao	19–25	22–25	25–23	25–21	11–15	102–109
08 Feb	16:00	Maejo U. Thai-Denmark	1–3	Chonburi	17–25	25–20	16–25	20–25		78–95
09 Feb	15:00	Suandusit	2–3	Nakhon Ratchasima	25–21	21–25	19–25	25–21	8–15	98–107
12 Feb	19:00	Kasetsart	3–1	Cosmo Chiangrai	29–31	25–18	25–18	25–21		104–88
15 Feb	15:00	Krungkao	2–3	Nakhon Ratchasima	19–25	22–25	25–23	25–21	11–15	102–109
15 Feb	16:00	Pibulsongkram Phitsanulok	1–3	Maejo U. Thai-Denmark	17–25	25–20	16–25	20–25		78–95
16 Feb	16:00	Chonburi	3–2	Kasetsart	21–25	25–17	25–18	14–25	15–12	100–97
16 Feb	19:00	Cosmo Chiangrai	0–3	Suandusit	19–25	22–25	19–25			60–75
22 Feb	16:00	Maejo U. Thai-Denmark	1–3	Krungkao	22–25	25–18	18–25	22–25		87–93
22 Feb	17:00	Nakhon Ratchasima	3–1	Cosmo Chiangrai	24–26	25–18	25–20	27–25		101–89
23 Feb	13:00	Suandusit	0–3	Chonburi	13–25	20–25	16–25			49–75
23 Feb	14:00	Kasetsart	3–1	Pibulsongkram Phitsanulok	22–25	25–14	25–14	25–15		97–68
01 Mar	15:00	Pibulsongkram Phitsanulok	1–3	Suandusit	25–23	23–25	22–25	21–25		91–38
01 Mar	17:00	Krungkao	3–0	Cosmo Chiangrai	25–23	25–21	25–17			75–61
02 Mar	16:00	Chonburi	1–3	Nakhon Ratchasima	30–28	17–25	17–25	21–25		85–103
02 Mar	16:00	Maejo U. Thai-Denmark	2–3	Kasetsart	25–20	25–21	24–26	23–25	11–15	108–107

=== Round 2 ===
Date	Time		Score		Set 1	Set 2	Set 3	Set 4	Set 5	Total
08 Mar	16:00	Maejo U. Thai-Denmark	1–3	Suandusit	22–25	22–25	25–23	22–25		91–98
09 Mar	16:00	Chonburi	3–0	Cosmo Chiangrai	25–10	25–20	25–19			75–49
16 Mar	15:00	Krungkao	3–2	Kasetsart	27–29	29–31	25–21	25–22	15–13	121–116
18 Mar	15:00	Pibulsongkram Phitsanulok	0–3	Nakhon Ratchasima	15–25	20–25	14–25			49–75
23 Mar	14:30	Cosmo Chiangrai	3–0	Pibulsongkram Phitsanulok	25–18	25–19	25–21			75–58
23 Mar	15:00	Nakhon Ratchasima	3–0	Maejo U. Thai-Denmark	25–16	25–20	25–16			75–52
23 Mar	15:30	Suandusit	3–1	Kasetsart	25–23	24–26	25–18	28–26		102–93
23 Mar	17:00	Krungkao	0–3	Chonburi	22–25	16–25	23–25			61–75
29 Mar	14:00	Kasetsart	0–3	Nakhon Ratchasima	18–25	18–25	10–25			46–75
30 Mar	14:00	Maejo U. Thai-Denmark	3–0	Cosmo Chiangrai	25–22	25–22	25–22			75–66
30 Mar	15:00	Pibulsongkram Phitsanulok	0–3	Chonburi	12–25	17–25	17–25			46–75
30 Mar	15:00	Suandusit	1–3	Krungkao	22–25	25–21	22–25	14–25		83–96
05 Apr	17:00	Nakhon Ratchasima	3–0	Suandusit	25–21	25–23	25–18			75–62
06 Apr	14:00	Chonburi	3–0	Maejo U. Thai-Denmark	25–18	25–18	25–20			75–56
06 Apr	14:30	Cosmo Chiangrai	1–3	Kasetsart	27–25	23–25	15–25	20–25		85–100
06 Apr	15:00	Krungkao	3–1	Pibulsongkram Phitsanulok	25–16	25–18	24–26	25–16		99–75
19 Apr	15:00	Suandusit	3–1	Cosmo Chiangrai	21–25	26–24	25–20	25–22		97–92
20 Apr	16:00	Maejo U. Thai-Denmark	3–1	Pibulsongkram Phitsanulok	25–23	17–25	25–23	25–21		92–92
20 Apr	17:00	Nakhon Ratchasima	3–1	Krungkao	25–22	25–17	22–25	25–14		97–78
23 Apr	19:00	Kasetsart	0–3	Chonburi	18–25	23–25	15–25			56–75
26 Apr	17:00	Krungkao	3–0	Maejo U. Thai-Denmark	25–19	25–19	25–19			75–57
27 Apr	14:30	Cosmo Chiangrai	1–3	Nakhon Ratchasima	25–22	19–25	17–25	18–25		79–97
27 Apr	15:00	Pibulsongkram Phitsanulok	0–3	Kasetsart	23–25	21–25	20–25			64–75
27 Apr	16:00	Chonburi	3–0	Suandusit	25–19	30–28	25–20			80–64
03 May	14:30	Cosmo Chiangrai	3–2	Krungkao	25–20	18–25	23–25	25–19	15–13	106–102
03 May	15:00	Suandusit	3–0	Pibulsongkram Phitsanulok	25–17	25–15	25–19			75–51
03 May	14:30	Kasetsart	3–0	Maejo U. Thai-Denmark	25–21	25–19	25–22			75–62
03 May	15:00	Nakhon Ratchasima	3–0	Chonburi	25–21	29–27	25–20			79–68

== Final standing ==
Rank	Team
1st place, gold medalist(s)	Nakhon Ratchasima
2nd place, silver medalist(s)	Chonburi
3rd place, bronze medalist(s)	Suandusit
4	Kasetsart
5	Krungkao
6	Cosmo Chiangrai
7	Pibulsongkram Phitsanulok
8	Maejo U. Thai-Denmark

Qualified for the 2014 Thai-Denmark Super League
Relegated to Group 2

== Awards ==
Award	Winner	Team
MVP	(Thailand) Wanchai Tabwises	Nakhon Ratchasima
Best setter	(Thailand) Nattapong Kesapan	Krungkao
Best outside spiker	(Thailand) Wanchai Tabwises	Nakhon Ratchasima
Best middle blocker	(Thailand) Pongpet Namkhuntod	Sisaket Suandusit
Best opposite spiker	(Thailand) Nara Jankaew	Pibulsongkram Phitsanulok
Best receiver	(Thailand) Montri Puanglib	Sisaket Suandusit
Best libero	(Thailand) Tanarak Ruensri	Krungkao
