= 2012–13 Men's Volleyball Thailand League =

- League: Volleyball Thailand League
- Sport: Volleyball
- Duration: November 4, 2012 – April 28, 2013
- Teams: 8
- Season champions: Nakhon Ratchasima (2nd title)
- Season MVP: Wanchai Tabwises
- Top scorer: Jirayu Raksakaew

Men's Volleyball Thailand League seasons
- ← 2011–12 2013–14 →

The Volleyball Thailand League is the highest level of Thailand club volleyball in the 2012–13 season and the 8th edition.

== Ranking ==
| Pos | Team | Pld | W | L | Pts | SW | SL | SR | SPW | SPL | SPR |
|---|---|---|---|---|---|---|---|---|---|---|---|
| 1 | Nakhon Ratchasima | 14 | 13 | 1 | 39 | 39 | 7 | 5.571 | 1134 | 937 | 1.210 |
| 2 | Suan Dusit | 14 | 12 | 2 | 35 | 38 | 12 | 3.167 | 1205 | 1020 | 1.181 |
| 3 | Chonburi E-tech Air force | 14 | 8 | 6 | 25 | 29 | 21 | 1.381 | 1185 | 1086 | 1.091 |
| 4 | Krungkao | 14 | 7 | 7 | 21 | 25 | 24 | 1.042 | 1114 | 1121 | 0.994 |
| 5 | Cosmo – Chiang Rai | 14 | 6 | 8 | 20 | 26 | 29 | 0.897 | 1203 | 1195 | 1.007 |
| 6 | Maejo University | 14 | 6 | 8 | 15 | 21 | 30 | 0.700 | 1098 | 1155 | 0.951 |
| 7 | Chaiyaphum | 14 | 3 | 11 | 8 | 14 | 38 | 0.368 | 1057 | 1211 | 0.873 |
| 8 | Udon Thani | 14 | 1 | 13 | 5 | 10 | 41 | 0.244 | 927 | 1199 | 0.773 |

== Round 1-2 ==
| Date | Time | | Score | | Set 1 | Set 2 | Set 3 | Set 4 | Set 5 | Total | Report |
|---|---|---|---|---|---|---|---|---|---|---|---|
| 4 Nov | | Chonburi E-tech Air force | 3–1 | Krungkao | 25–21 | 22–25 | 25–22 | 25–21 | | 97–89 | |
| 4 Nov | | Udon Thani | 2–3 | Chaiyaphum | 25–23 | 19–25 | 21–25 | 25–17 | 10–15 | 100–105 | |
| 11 Nov | | Udon Thani | 0–3 | Suan Dusit | 19–25 | 12–25 | 18–25 | | | 49–75 | |
| 11 Nov | | Cosmo – Chiang Rai | 0–3 | Nakhon Ratchasima | 21–25 | 21–25 | 23–25 | | | 65–75 | |
| 17 Nov | | Maejo U. | 3–0 | Udon Thani | 25–16 | 25–23 | 25–18 | | | 75–57 | |
| 18 Nov | | Maejo U. | 1–3 | Krungkao | 22–25 | 25–20 | 25–27 | 22–25 | | 94–97 | |
| 18 Nov | | Chonburi E-tech Air force | 1–3 | Chaiyaphum | 19–25 | 25–15 | 18–25 | 23–25 | | 85–90 | |
| 18 Nov | | Suan Dusit | 3–0 | Nakhon Ratchasima | 25–22 | 25–23 | 25–20 | | | 75–65 | |
| 25 Nov | | Krungkao | 1–3 | Suan Dusit | 25–23 | 18–25 | 17–25 | 22–25 | | 82–98 | |
| 1 Dec | | Krungkao | 3–1 | Udon Thani | 22–25 | 27–25 | 25–17 | 22–19 | | 96–86 | |
| 1 Dec | | Nakhon Ratchasima | 3–0 | Maejo U. | 29–27 | 25–11 | 25–21 | | | 79–59 | |
| 2 Dec | | Cosmo – Chiang Rai | 0–3 | Chonburi E-tech Air force | 16–25 | 21–25 | 21–25 | | | 58–75 | |
| 2 Dec | | Maejo U. | 1–3 | Suan Dusit | 25–22 | 22–25 | 20–25 | 23–25 | | 90–97 | |
| 5 Dec | | Suan Dusit | 1–3 | Chonburi E-tech Air force | 21–25 | 25–27 | 25–23 | 26–28 | | 97–103 | |
| 5 Dec | | Krungkao | 1–3 | Cosmo – Chiang Rai | 23–25 | 28–26 | 22–25 | 19–25 | | 92–101 | |
| 8 Dec | | Cosmo – Chiang Rai | 1–3 | Chaiyaphum | 21–25 | 25–19 | 25–14 | 25–19 | | 96–77 | |
| 22 Dec | | Cosmo – Chiang Rai | 2–3 | Maejo U. | 13–25 | 23–25 | 25–18 | 25–21 | 12–15 | 98–104 | |
| 22 Dec | | Chaiyaphum | 0–3 | Nakhon Ratchasima | 23–25 | 19–25 | 22–25 | | | 64–75 | |
| 5 Jan | | Udon Thani | 0–3 | Cosmo – Chiang Rai | 16–25 | 15–25 | 17–25 | | | 48–75 | |
| 5 Jan | | Suan Dusit | 3–0 | Chaiyaphum | 25–18 | 25–22 | 25–18 | | | 75–58 | |
| 6 Jan | | Chonburi E-tech Air force | 1–3 | Nakhon Ratchasima | 18–25 | 29–31 | 25–18 | 24–26 | | 96–100 | |
| 20 Jan | | Nakhon Ratchasima | 3–0 | Udon Thani | 25–15 | 25–18 | 25–14 | | | 75–47 | |
| 20 Jan | | Suan Dusit | 3–0 | Cosmo – Chiang Rai | 25–18 | 25–20 | 25–20 | | | 75–58 | |
| 26 Jan | | Nakhon Ratchasima | 3–0 | Krungkao | 25–22 | 25–13 | 25–16 | | | 75–51 | |
| 27 Jan | | Chaiyaphum | 0–3 | Maejo U. | 23–25 | 18–25 | 20–25 | | | 61–75 | |
| 27 Jan | | Udon Thani | 0–3 | Chonburi E-tech Air force | 17–25 | 13–25 | 18–25 | | | 48–75 | |
| 3 Feb | | Chonburi E-tech Air force | 3–1 | Maejo U. | 29–27 | 23–25 | 25–22 | 25–21 | | 102–95 | |
| 3 Feb | | Chaiyaphum | 0–3 | Krungkao | 13–25 | 23–25 | 21–25 | | | 57–75 | |
| 16 Feb | | Chaiyaphum | 2–3 | Udon Thani | 25–19 | 21–25 | 16–25 | 25–19 | 11–15 | 98–103 | |
| 17 Feb | | Chonburi E-tech Air force | 0–3 | Suan Dusit | 20–25 | 23–25 | 15–25 | | | 58–75 | |
| 17 Feb | | Chaiyaphum | 1–3 | Cosmo – Chiang Rai | 20–25 | 25–21 | 17–25 | 15–25 | | 77–96 | |
| 20 Feb | | Suan Dusit | 3–0 | Maejo U. | 25–20 | 25–21 | 25–18 | | | 75–59 | |
| 23 Feb | | Chaiyaphum | 1–3 | Suan Dusit | 18–25 | 14–25 | 25–20 | 19–25 | | 76–95 | |
| 24 Feb | | Chonburi E-tech Air force | 3–0 | Krungkao | 25–20 | 25–22 | 25–23 | | | 75–65 | |
| 24 Feb | | Udon Thani | 2–3 | Maejo U. | 25–20 | 26–24 | 17–25 | 17–25 | 12–15 | 97–109 | |
| 2 Mar | | Nakhon Ratchasima | 3–1 | Suan Dusit | 19–25 | 25–22 | 25–27 | 25–21 | | 94–95 | |
| 2 Mar | | Udon Thani | 0–3 | Krungkao | 17–25 | 22–25 | 22–25 | | | 61–75 | |
| 3 Mar | | Nakhon Ratchasima | 3–1 | Cosmo – Chiang Rai | 25–20 | 25–20 | 21–25 | 25–20 | | 96–85 | |
| 3 Mar | | Chaiyaphum | 3–2 | Chonburi E-tech Air force | 20–25 | 25–19 | 27–29 | 25–21 | 17–15 | 114–109 | |
| 6 Mar | | Krungkao | 3–0 | Maejo U. | 25–21 | 25–14 | 25–17 | | | 75–52 | |
| 9 Mar | | Suan Dusit | 3–0 | Udon Thani | 25–11 | 25–15 | 25–20 | | | 75–46 | |
| 16 Mar | | Nakhon Ratchasima | 3–0 | Chonburi E-tech Air force | 26–24 | 25–22 | 25–23 | | | 76–69 | |
| 16 Mar | | Cosmo – Chiang Rai | 3–0 | Krungkao | 25–21 | 225–23 | 25–16 | | | 275–60 | |
| 17 Mar | | Nakhon Ratchasima | 3–2 | Chaiyaphum | 23–25 | 25–23 | 25–16 | 25–27 | 15–10 | 113–101 | |
| 17 Mar | | Cosmo – Chiang Rai | 1–3 | Udon Thani | 20–25 | 25–21 | 17–25 | 15–25 | | 77–96 | |
| 30 Mar | | Krungkao | 1–3 | Nakhon Ratchasima | 24–26 | 18–25 | 25–23 | 21–25 | | 88–99 | |
| 31 Mar | | Cosmo – Chiang Rai | 2–3 | Suan Dusit | 20–25 | 25–23 | 25–23 | 26–28 | 11–15 | 107–114 | |
| 6 Apr | | Udon Thani | 0–3 | Nakhon Ratchasima | 14–25 | 15–25 | 16–25 | | | 45–75 | |
| 6 Apr | | Maejo U. | 3–0 | Chaiyaphum | 25–19 | 25–21 | 25–20 | | | 75–60 | |
| 7 Apr | | Maejo U. | 3–2 | Chonburi E-tech Air force | 19–25 | 25–23 | 19–25 | 25–21 | 15–11 | 103–105 | |
| 20 Apr | | Maejo U. | 0–3 | Chonburi E-tech Air force | 13–25 | 25–27 | 23–25 | | | 61–77 | |
| 21 Apr | | Krungkao | 3–0 | Chaiyaphum | 27–25 | 25–22 | 25–18 | | | 77–65 | |
| 27 Apr | | Suan Dusit | 3–1 | Krungkao | 25–20 | 25–19 | 19–25 | 25–17 | | 94–81 | |
| 27 Apr | | Maejo U. | 0–3 | Nakhon Ratchasima | 17–25 | 14–25 | 22–25 | | | 53–75 | |
| 27 Apr | | Chonburi E-tech Air force | 3–0 | Udon Thani | 25–13 | 25–14 | 25–12 | | | 75–39 | |
| 28 Apr | | Chonburi E-tech Air force | 3–1 | Cosmo – Chiang Rai | 23–25 | 25–17 | 25–14 | 25–15 | | 98–71 | |

== Final standing ==
| Rank | Team |
|---|---|
| 1st place, gold medalist(s) | Nakhon Ratchasima |
| 2nd place, silver medalist(s) | Suan Dusit |
| 3rd place, bronze medalist(s) | Chonburi E-tech Air force |
| 4 | Krungkao |
| 5 | Cosmo – Chiang Rai |
| 6 | Maejo University |
| 7 | Chaiyaphum |
| 8 | Udon Thani |

== Awards ==
| Award | Winner | Team |
|---|---|---|
| Most valuable player | (Thailand) Wanchai Tabwises | Nakhon Ratchasima |
| Best scorer | (Thailand) Jirayu Raksakaew | Chonburi E-tech Air force |
| Best setter | (Thailand) ชัยณรงค์ ด้วงทอง | Cosmo – Chiang Rai |
| Best spiker | (Thailand) Wanchai Tabwises | Nakhon Ratchasima |
| Best Middle Blocker | (Thailand) Wutthichai Suksala | Nakhon Ratchasima |
| Best Serve | (Thailand) อนันต์ อนุรักษ์ | Chonburi E-tech Air force |
| Best Receiver Spiker | (Thailand) Piyarat Toontupthai | Cosmo – Chiang Rai |
| Best receiver | (Thailand) Montri Puanglib | Suan Dusit |
| Best libero | (Thailand) Montri Puanglib | Suan Dusit |
