= 2012 Men's European Volleyball League =

Tournament details
- Host country: Turkey
- Dates: May 24 – June 24 (qualification); June 30 – July 1 (final round)
- Teams: 10
- Venue: 1 (in 1 host city)

Final positions
- Champions: Netherlands (2nd title)

Tournament awards
- MVP: (Turkey) Emre Batur

The 2012 Men's European Volleyball League was the ninth edition of the annual Men's European Volleyball League, which featured men's national volleyball teams from ten European countries. A preliminary league round was played from May 24 to June 24, and the final four tournament, which was held at Ankara, Turkey.

During the league round, competing nations were drawn into two pools of five teams, and every team hosted a tournament with three other teams and played a round-robin system over three days. Every team played at four tournaments and one standings table was used, combined with all five tournaments. The Pool winners and runners-up qualified for the final four round, joining the host team.

The Netherlands defeated Turkey 3–2 in the final.

== Teams ==
- Austria
- Czech Republic
- Denmark
- Greece
- Israel
- Netherlands
- Romania
- Slovakia
- Spain
- Turkey

== League round ==
=== Pool A ===
Pos	Team	Pld	W	L	Pts	SW	SL	SR	SPW	SPL	SPR	Qualification
1	Spain	12	11	1	30	35	15	2.333	1160	1051	1.104	Final Four
2	Slovakia	12	7	5	23	29	19	1.526	1103	1029	1.072	Final Four
3	Israel	12	5	7	14	20	27	0.741	1059	1096	0.966	
4	Denmark	12	4	8	14	19	28	0.679	1009	1077	0.937	
5	Greece	12	3	9	9	17	31	0.548	1023	1101	0.929	

==== Leg 1 ====
- Venue: New Indoor Sport Hall, Katerini, Greece

Date	Time		Score		Set 1	Set 2	Set 3	Set 4	Set 5	Total	Report
24 May	18:00	Israel	0–3	Slovakia	20–25	22–25	27–29			69–79	Report
24 May	20:30	Spain	3–0	Greece	25–21	25–20	25–19			75–60	Report
25 May	18:00	Slovakia	1–3	Spain	20–25	25–19	19–25	21–25		85–94	Report
25 May	20:30	Greece	3–0	Israel	26–24	25–20	25–19			76–63	Report
26 May	18:00	Spain	3–0	Israel	25–22	28–26	27–25			80–73	Report
26 May	20:30	Slovakia	2–3	Greece	23–25	25–21	25–20	21–25	10–15	104–106	Report

==== Leg 2 ====
- Venue: Pabellón Municipal Los Planos, Teruel, Spain

Date	Time		Score		Set 1	Set 2	Set 3	Set 4	Set 5	Total	Report
1 Jun	17:00	Greece	0–3	Slovakia	18–25	19–25	18–25			55–75	Report
1 Jun	20:00	Spain	3–2	Denmark	25–18	23–25	20–25	25–14	15–11	108–93	Report
2 Jun	15:00	Denmark	3–2	Slovakia	19–25	25–20	22–25	25–19	15–13	106–102	Report
2 Jun	18:00	Spain	3–1	Greece	27–29	25–19	25–15	25–22		102–85	Report
3 Jun	15:00	Greece	0–3	Denmark	21–25	26–28	23–25			70–78	Report
3 Jun	18:00	Slovakia	2–3	Spain	26–24	25–23	17–25	23–25	11–15	102–112	Report

==== Leg 3 ====
- Venue: Metrowest Sport Palace, Ra'anana, Israel

Date	Time		Score		Set 1	Set 2	Set 3	Set 4	Set 5	Total	Report
8 Jun	17:00	Israel	3–0	Denmark	25–22	25–18	25–20			75–60	Report
8 Jun	19:30	Slovakia	3–1	Greece	25–19	24–26	25–12	25–19		99–76	Report
9 Jun	17:00	Denmark	0–3	Slovakia	24–26	21–25	22–25			67–76	Report
9 Jun	19:30	Greece	1–3	Israel	21–25	24–26	25–22	19–25		89–98	Report
10 Jun	17:00	Denmark	3–1	Greece	25–20	25–18	22–25	26–24		98–87	Report
10 Jun	19:30	Israel	2–3	Slovakia	17–25	26–24	24–26	27–25	14–16	108–116	Report

==== Leg 4 ====
- Venue: Kildeskovshallen, Gentofte, Denmark

Date	Time		Score		Set 1	Set 2	Set 3	Set 4	Set 5	Total	Report
15 Jun	16:30	Greece	2–3	Israel	29–31	21–25	25–16	25–18	7–15	107–105	Report
15 Jun	19:00	Denmark	0–3	Spain	20–25	20–25	22–25			62–75	Report
16 Jun	16:00	Israel	1–3	Spain	16–25	26–24	24–26	23–25		89–100	Report
16 Jun	18:30	Greece	3–2	Denmark	25–19	23–25	25–20	23–25	15–13	111–102	Report
17 Jun	16:00	Denmark	3–1	Israel	25–22	25–19	18–25	25–17		93–83	Report
17 Jun	18:30	Spain	3–2	Greece	25–18	25–21	20–25	17–25	15–13	102–102	Report

==== Leg 5 ====
- Venue: Steel Aréna, Košice, Slovakia

Date	Time		Score		Set 1	Set 2	Set 3	Set 4	Set 5	Total	Report
22 Jun	15:00	Israel	3–2	Spain	24–26	25–23	20–25	25–19	15–8	109–101	Report
22 Jun	17:30	Slovakia	3–0	Denmark	25–15	25–15	25–23			75–53	Report
23 Jun	15:00	Spain	3–2	Denmark	25–16	25–27	23–25	25–17	15–13	113–98	Report
23 Jun	17:30	Israel	1–3	Slovakia	23–25	16–25	25–22	20–25		84–97	Report
24 Jun	15:00	Denmark	1–3	Israel	25–23	23–25	25–27	26–28		99–103	Report
24 Jun	17:30	Slovakia	1–3	Spain	19–25	23–25	25–21	26–28		93–99	Report

=== Pool B ===
Pos	Team	Pld	W	L	Pts	SW	SL	SR	SPW	SPL	SPR	Qualification
1	Netherlands	12	10	2	29	31	11	2.818	984	895	1.099	Final Four
2	Czech Republic	12	6	6	20	25	20	1.250	1008	965	1.045	
3	Turkey (Note: Qualified as hosts) (H)	12	5	7	16	22	24	0.917	990	1015	0.975	Final Four
4	Austria	12	5	7	13	20	28	0.714	1050	1076	0.976	
5	Romania	12	4	8	12	12	27	0.444	861	942	0.914	

(H) Host

==== Leg 1 ====
- Venue: Sala Polivalentă, Piatra Neamț, Romania

Date	Time		Score		Set 1	Set 2	Set 3	Set 4	Set 5	Total	Report
25 May	17:00	Czech Republic	3–0	Turkey	25–17	25–16	25–21			75–54	Report
25 May	19:30	Romania	0–3	Netherlands	26–28	24–26	19–25			69–79	Report
26 May	17:00	Turkey	0–3	Netherlands	19–25	23–25	16–25			58–75	Report
26 May	19:30	Czech Republic	3–0	Romania	25–16	25–20	25–21			75–57	Report
27 May	17:00	Netherlands	1–3	Czech Republic	25–17	12–25	19–25	18–25		74–92	Report
27 May	19:30	Romania	3–1	Turkey	23–25	27–25	25–17	25–23		100–90	Report

==== Leg 2 ====
- Venue: Burhan Felek Spor Salonu, Istanbul, Turkey

Date	Time		Score		Set 1	Set 2	Set 3	Set 4	Set 5	Total	Report
1 Jun	17:30	Netherlands	3–0	Romania	25–18	25–18	25–23			75–59	Report
1 Jun	20:00	Turkey	1–3	Austria	22–25	25–21	16–25	17–25		80–96	Report
2 Jun	17:30	Netherlands	3–2	Austria	25–23	26–28	25–22	19–25	15–12	110–110	Report
2 Jun	20:00	Romania	0–3	Turkey	26–28	17–25	20–25			63–78	Report
3 Jun	17:30	Austria	3–0	Romania	25–18	25–21	25–16			75–55	Report
3 Jun	20:00	Turkey	3–0	Netherlands	25–15	25–23	25–21			75–59	Report

==== Leg 3 ====
- Venue: City Hall, Jablonec, Czech Republic

Date	Time		Score		Set 1	Set 2	Set 3	Set 4	Set 5	Total	Report
8 Jun	14:00	Czech Republic	3–1	Austria	23–25	30–28	25–20	25–20		103–93	Report
8 Jun	17:00	Turkey	3–0	Romania	25–19	25–22	25–23			75–64	Report
9 Jun	14:00	Turkey	3–1	Czech Republic	25–23	21–25	25–19	25–16		96–83	Report
9 Jun	17:00	Romania	3–1	Austria	25–20	21–25	25–22	25–17		96–84	Report
10 Jun	15:15	Czech Republic	0–3	Romania	18–25	23–25	24–26			65–76	Report
10 Jun	18:00	Austria	3–2	Turkey	20–25	25–19	25–15	14–25	15–13	99–97	Report

==== Leg 4 ====
- Venue: Topsportcentrum, Rotterdam, Netherlands

Date	Time		Score		Set 1	Set 2	Set 3	Set 4	Set 5	Total	Report
15 Jun	17:00	Romania	0–3	Czech Republic	21–25	20–25	20–25			61–75	Report
15 Jun	19:30	Netherlands	3–0	Austria	25–15	25–14	25–22			75–51	Report
16 Jun	16:00	Czech Republic	2–3	Austria	25–27	25–20	21–25	25–21	15–17	111–110	Report
16 Jun	18:30	Romania	0–3	Netherlands	19–25	25–27	23–25			67–77	Report
17 Jun	15:00	Netherlands	3–1	Czech Republic	16–25	25–20	25–12	25–22		91–79	Report
17 Jun	17:30	Austria	1–3	Romania	25–15	23–25	19–25	27–29		94–94	Report

==== Leg 5 ====
- Venue: Sporthalle am See, Hard, Austria

Date	Time		Score		Set 1	Set 2	Set 3	Set 4	Set 5	Total	Report
21 Jun	17:25	Turkey	2–3	Austria	25–22	22–25	25–21	19–25	10–15	101–108	Report
21 Jun	20:20	Czech Republic	1–3	Netherlands	25–23	20–25	15–25	14–25		74–98	Report
22 Jun	17:25	Austria	0–3	Netherlands	25–27	21–25	21–25			67–77	Report
22 Jun	20:20	Turkey	3–2	Czech Republic	9–25	25–16	18–25	25–22	15–11	92–99	Report
23 Jun	17:25	Austria	0–3	Czech Republic	18–25	25–27	20–25			63–77	Report
23 Jun	20:20	Netherlands	3–1	Turkey	27–25	17–25	25–23	25–21		94–94	Report

== Final four ==
- Venue: Başkent Volleyball Hall, Ankara, Turkey

Qualified teams

- Netherlands
- Slovakia
- Spain
- Turkey (host)

Semifinals
June 30 – Ankara
Netherlands	3
Slovakia	0
June 30 – Ankara
Turkey	3
Spain	2

Final
July 1 – Ankara
Netherlands	3
Turkey	2
Third place
July 1 – Ankara
Slovakia	1
Spain	3

=== Semifinals ===
Date	Time		Score		Set 1	Set 2	Set 3	Set 4	Set 5	Total	Report
30 Jun	15:00	Netherlands	3–0	Slovakia	25–15	25–23	26–24			76–62	Report
30 Jun	17:30	Turkey	3–2	Spain	28–26	25–13	24–26	20–25	18–16	115–106	Report

=== Third place match ===
Date	Time		Score		Set 1	Set 2	Set 3	Set 4	Set 5	Total	Report
1 July	13:30	Slovakia	1–3	Spain	26–28	29–27	20–25	26–28		101–108	Report

=== Final ===
Date	Time		Score		Set 1	Set 2	Set 3	Set 4	Set 5	Total	Report
1 July	16:00	Netherlands	3–2	Turkey	25–16	25–15	22–25	23–25	26–24	121–105	Report

== Final standing ==
Rank	Team
1st place, gold medalist(s)	Netherlands
2nd place, silver medalist(s)	Turkey
3rd place, bronze medalist(s)	Spain
4	Slovakia
5	Czech Republic
6	Israel
7	Denmark
8	Austria
9	Romania
10	Greece

Qualified for the 2013 World League Pool C

2012 European League champions

Netherlands
2nd title

12-man Roster for Final Round
Nimir Abdel-Aziz, Nico Freriks, Thijs Ter Horst, Jelte Maan, Humphrey Krolis, Gijs Jorna, Sebastiaan Van Bemmelen, Jeroen Rauwerdink, Wytze Kooistra, Maarten Van Garderen, Thomas Koelewijn, Robin Overbeeke
Head coach
Edwin Benne

== Awards ==
- Most valuable player
  (Turkey) Emre Batur
- Best scorer
  (Turkey) Serhat Coşkun
- Best spiker
  (Spain) Ibán Pérez
- Best blocker
  (Spain) Jorge Fernandez Valcarel
- Best server
  (Netherlands) Nimir Abdel-Aziz
- Best setter
  (Netherlands) Nimir Abdel-Aziz
- Best receiver
  (Spain) Gustavo Delgado Escribano
- Best libero
  (Netherlands) Gijs Jorna
