= Bahraini Men's Volleyball League =

- Current season, competition or edition: 2024–25 Bahraini League
- Sport: Volleyball
- First season: 1974; 52 years ago
- Administrator: BVA
- No. of teams: 9 teams
- Country: Bahrain
- Confederation: AVC
- Continent: Asia
- Most recent champion: Al Muharraq Club (16th titles) (2024–25)
- Most titles: Al Muharraq Club (16 titles)
- Level on pyramid: Level 1
- Relegation to: National 2
- Domestic cups: Bahraini Cup; Bahraini Super Cup
- International cups: AVC Champions League; Arab Clubs Championship

The Bahraini Volleyball League ( Arabic : الدوري البحريني للكرة الطائرة ) is the highest level of men's volleyball in Bahrain and it is organized by Bahrain Volleyball Association. Bahrain Volleyball League is currently contested by 9 clubs around the country as of the last season Played 2023–24.

The regular season is played by 9 teams, playing each other twice, once at home and once away from home. After the regular season, the four best-placed teams enter the play-offs and the last two teams were automatically relegated.

== Teams by Titles ==
| Rank | Team | Titles |
|---|---|---|
| 1 | Al Muharraq Club | 16 |
| 2 | Al Nasr Club | 12 |
| 3 | Al Hala Club | 7 |
| 4 | Al Najma Club | 6 |
| 5 | Al Ahli Club | 4 |
| = | Dar Kulaib Club | 4 |

== Winners list ==
| Year | Champion |
|---|---|
| 1974–75 | Al Hala Club |
| 1975–76 | Al Hala Club |
| 1976–77 | Al Hala Club |
| 1977–78 | Al Hala Club |
| 1978–79 | Al Hala Club |
| 1979–80 | Al Hala Club |
| 1980–81 | Al Hala Club |
| 1981–82 | Al Nasr Club |
| 1982–83 | Al Nasr Club |
| 1983–84 | Al Nasr Club |
| 1984–85 | Al Nasr Club |
| 1985–86 | Al Najma Club |
| 1986–87 | Al Najma Club |
| 1987–88 | Al Najma Club |
| 1988–89 | Al Najma Club |
| 1989–90 | Al Nasr Club |
| 1990–91 | Al Nasr Club |
| 1991–92 | Al Nasr Club |

| Year | Champion |
|---|---|
| 1992–93 | Al Nasr Club |
| 1993–94 | Al Muharraq Club |
| 1994–95 | Al Muharraq Club |
| 1995–96 | Al Muharraq Club |
| 1996–97 | Al Muharraq Club |
| 1997–98 | Al Muharraq Club |
| 1998–99 | Al Muharraq Club |
| 1999–2000 | Al Muharraq Club |
| 2000–01 | Al Muharraq Club |
| 2001–02 | Al Muharraq Club |
| 2002–03 | Al Najma Club |
| 2003–04 | Al Muharraq Club |
| 2004–05 | Al Nasr Club |
| 2005–06 | Al Muharraq Club |
| 2006–07 | Al Nasr Club |
| 2007–08 | Al Nasr Club |
| 2008–09 | Al Muharraq Club |
| 2009–10 | Al Muharraq Club |

| Year | Champion |
|---|---|
| 2010–11 | Al Muharraq Club |
| 2011–12 | Al Nasr Club |
| 2012–13 | Not Played |
| 2013–14 | Not Played |
| 2014–15 | Al Ahli Club |
| 2015–16 | Dar Kulaib Club |
| 2016–17 | Al Najma Club |
| 2017–18 | Al Ahli Club |
| 2018–19 | Dar Kulaib Club |
| 2019–20 | Al Muharraq Club |
| 2020–21 | Al Ahli Club |
| 2021–22 | Al Ahli Club |
| 2022–23 | Dar Kulaib Club |
| 2023–24 | Dar Kulaib Club |
| 2024–25 | Al Muharraq Club |
