= Nimir Abdel-Aziz =

Dutch volleyball player (born 1992)

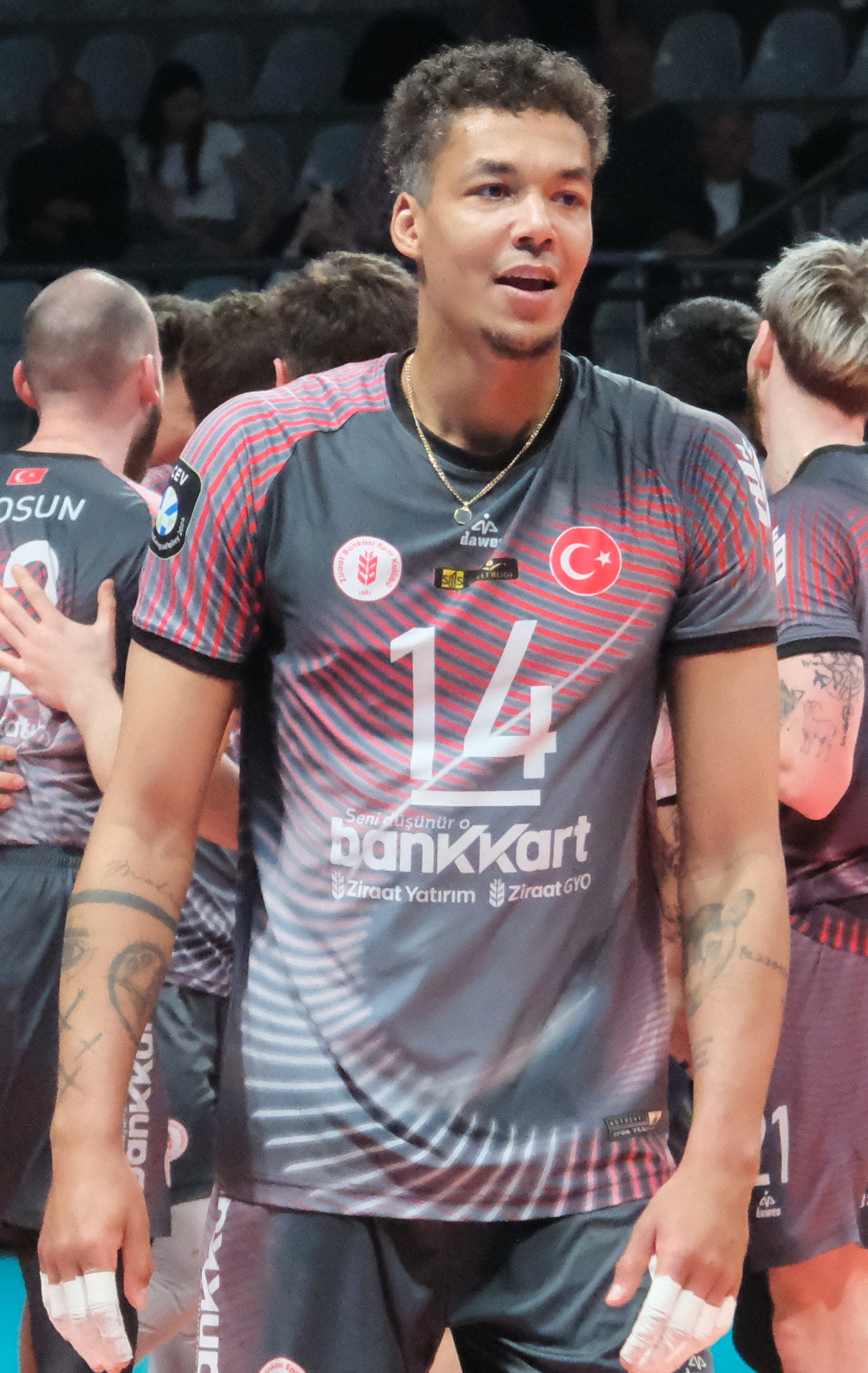

Personal information
- Born: 5 February 1992 (age 34); The Hague, Netherlands
- Height: 2.01 m (6 ft 7 in)
- Weight: 90 kg (198 lb)
- Spike: 365 cm (144 in)
- Block: 350 cm (138 in)

Volleyball information
- Position: Opposite

Career
Years	Teams
-2004; 2004-2008; 2008-2009; 2009–2010; 2010–2011; 2011–2012; 2012–2013; 2013–2014; 2014–2015; 2015–2017; 2017–2020; 2020–2021; 2021–2022; 2022; 2022–2024; 2024–2025; 2025–present	Haaften Kwiek; Sliedrecht sport AMVJ Martinus; Dynamo Apeldoorn; VC Zwolle; Volley Treviso; Piemonte Volley; Ziraat Bankası Ankara; ZAKSA Kędzierzyn-Koźle; Stade Poitevin Poitiers; Power Volley Milano; Trentino Volley; Modena Volley; Paykan Tehran; Halkbank Ankara; Wolfdogs Nagoya; Ziraat Bankası Ankara

National team
2011–	Netherlands
Honours
Men's volleyball
Representing Netherlands
European League
Gold medal – first place	2012 Turkey
Bronze medal – third place	2019 Estonia

Nimir Abdel-Aziz (born 5 February 1992) is a Dutch professional volleyball player who plays as an opposite hitter for and captains both Efeler Ligi club Ziraat Bankası S.K. and the Netherlands national team.

== Career ==
=== National team ===
Abdel-Aziz made his debut as the setter for the Dutch national team in 2011 against Belgium. He won the European League in 2012, after beating Turkey in the final.

=== Position change ===
In 2016, Abdel-Aziz changed his position from setter to opposite hitter in his club Stade Poitevin Poitiers. He has since then continued his volleyball career as an opposite in both clubs and the Dutch National Team.

During the 2020–21 CEV Champions League, he had to briefly play the setter role after both of the lined up setters were not available to compete in the pool play due to the COVID-19.

== Personal life ==
Abdel-Aziz was born in the Netherlands to a Chadian father and Dutch mother.

== Honours ==
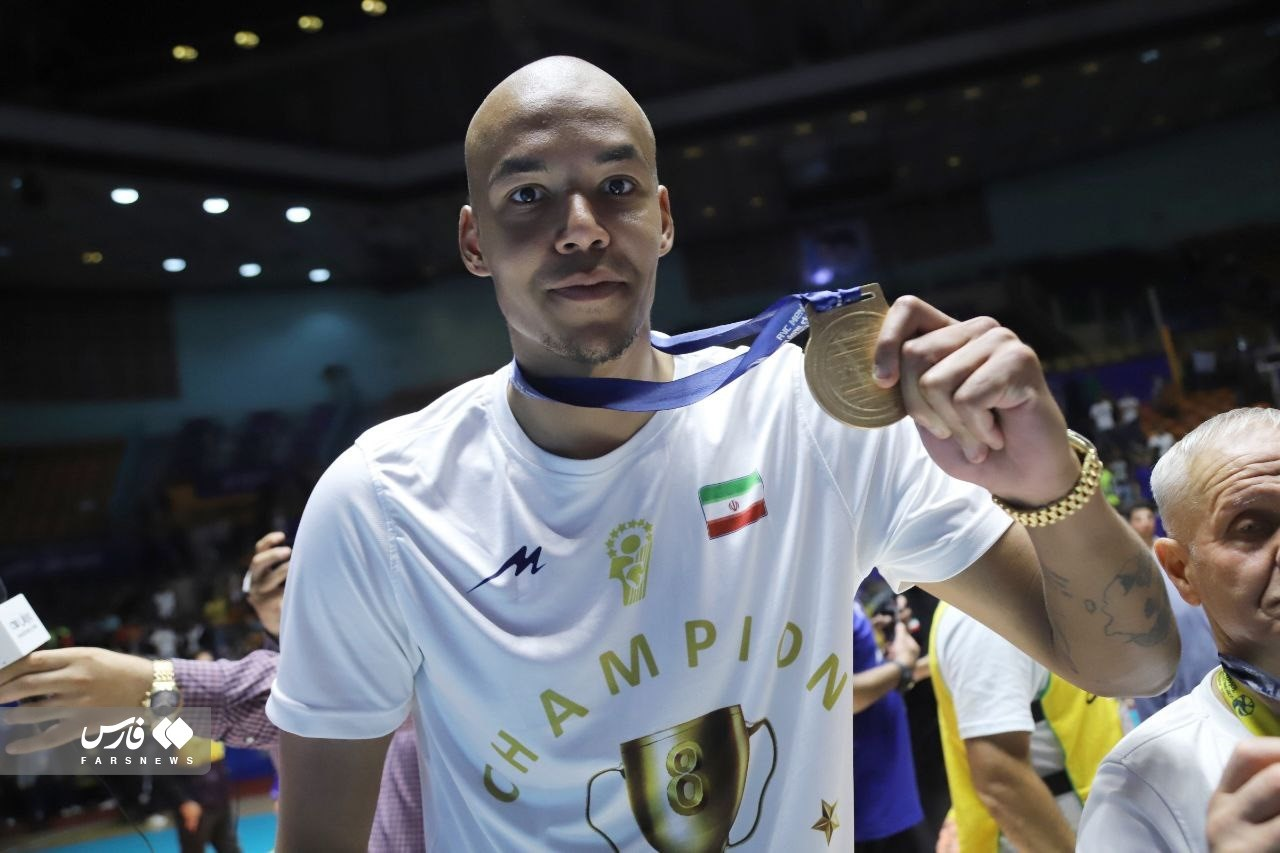
Abdel-Aziz with the Asian Championship medal.

=== Club ===
- CEV Champions League
  - 2012–13 – with Bre Banca Lannutti Cuneo
  - 2020–21 – with Trentino Volley
- AVC Champions League
  - 2022 – with Paykan Tehran
  - 2025 – with Al Rayyan
- Domestic
  - 2009–10 Dutch Championship, with Dynamo Apeldoorn

=== Individual awards ===
- 2012: European League – Best server
- 2012: European League – Best setter
- 2021: CEV European Championship – Best opposite
- 2025: AVC Champions League – Most valuable player
- 2025: AVC Champions League – Best opposite
