= Robin Overbeeke =

Dutch volleyball player (born 1989)

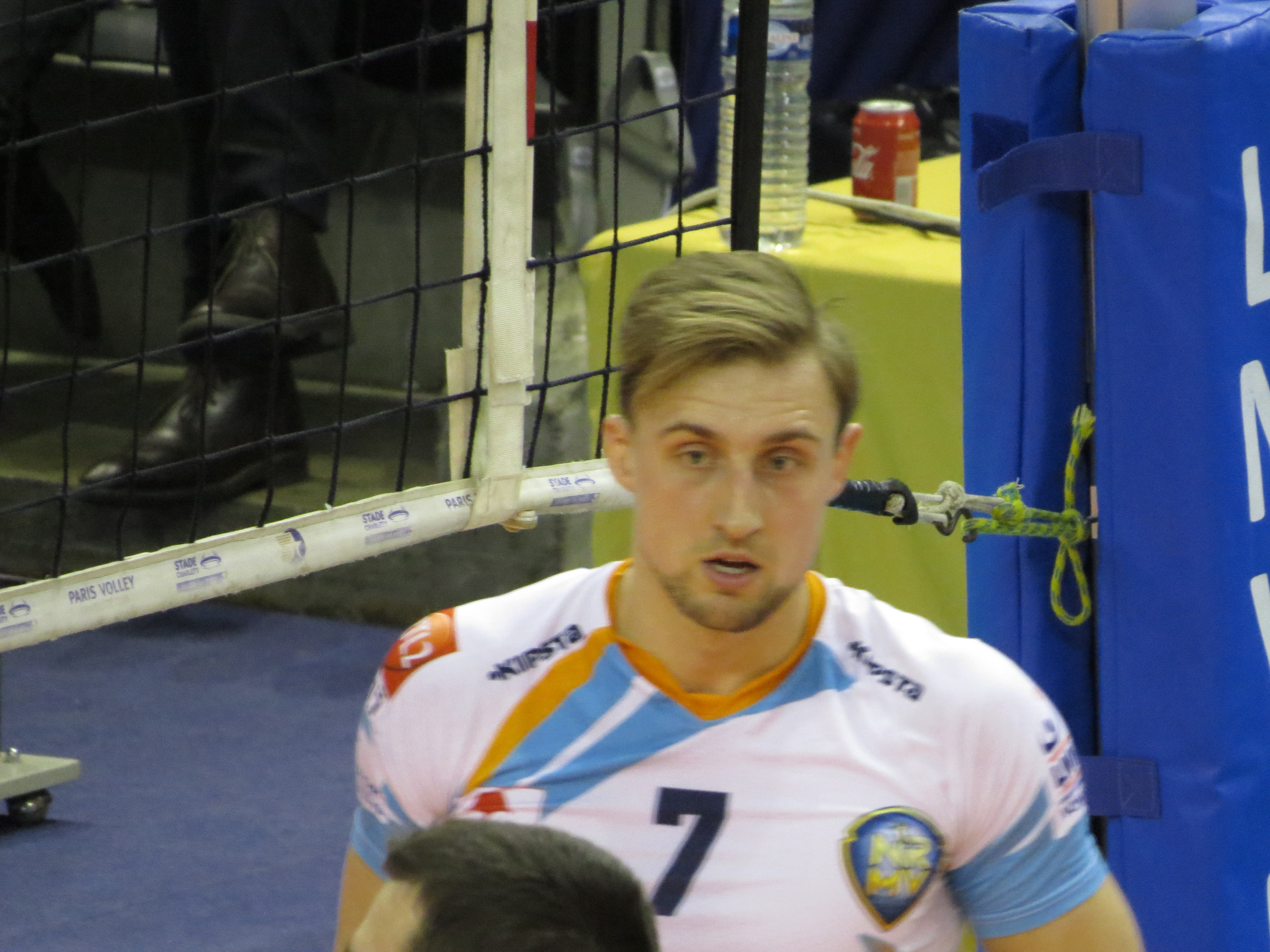

Personal information
- Nationality: Dutch
- Born: 21 March 1989 (age 37); Leidschendam
- Height: 198 cm (6 ft 6 in)
- Weight: 92 kg (203 lb)
- Spike: 347 cm (137 in)
- Block: 328 cm (129 in)

Volleyball information
- Number: 16 (national team)

Career
Years	Teams
2011-2012; 2012-2013; 2013-	Euphony Asse-Lennik; Volley Brolo; Lindemans Aalst

National team
2013-	Netherlands

Robin Overbeeke (born 21 March 1989) is a Dutch male volleyball player. He is part of the Netherlands men's national volleyball team. On club level he plays for Lindemans Aalst.
