= Montri Puanglib =

Thai volleyball player (born 1990)

Personal information
- Full name: Montri Puanglib
- Nickname: Tri
- Born: March 24, 1990 (age 36); Phetchaburi, Thailand
- Height: 1.67 m (5 ft 6 in)
- Weight: 75 kg (165 lb)
- Spike: 311 cm (122 in)
- Block: 281 cm (111 in)

Volleyball information
- Position: Libero
- Current club: Nakhon Ratchasima
- Number: 88

National team
2013–2019, 2021	Thailand
Honours
VolleyballMen
Representing Thailand
SEA Games
Gold medal – first place	2013 Naypyidaw	Men
Gold medal – first place	2015 Singapore	Men
Gold medal – first place	2017 Kuala Lumpur	Team

Montri Puanglib (Thai: มนตรี พ่วงลิบ, born March 24, 1990) is a member of the Thailand men's national volleyball team He is nicknamed Tri.

== Career ==
Montri won the gold medal in the 2015 Southeast Asian Games.

== Clubs ==
- (Thailand) Suphan Buri (2009–2010)
- (Thailand) Nakhon Sawan (2011–2012)
- (Thailand) Suan Dusit (2012–2014)
- (Thailand) Ratchaburi (2015–2017)
- (Thailand) Phitsanulok (2017–2018)
- (Thailand) Saraburi (2018)
- (Thailand) Samutsakorn (2019–2020)
- (Thailand) Prince (2020–2021)
- (Thailand) Payak Sensei (2021–2022)
- (Thailand) Kohkood Cabana (2023–2024)
- (Thailand) Nakhon Ratchasima (2024–2026)

== Awards ==
=== Individual ===
- 2012–13 Thailand League "Best Receiver"
- 2012–13 Thailand League "Best Libero"
- 2013–14 Thailand League "Best Receiver"

=== Clubs ===
- 2009–10 Thailand League - Bronze medal, with Suphan Buri
- 2011–12 Thailand League - Bronze medal, with Nakhon Sawan
- 2016–17 Thailand League - Bronze medal, with Ratchaburi
- 2017–18 Thailand League - Third, with Phitsanulok
- 2018–19 Thailand League - Runner-Up, with Saraburi
- 2019 Thai–Denmark Super League - Third, with Saraburi
- 2024–25 Thailand League - Champion, with Nakhon Ratchasima
- 2025–26 Thailand League - Champion, with Nakhon Ratchasima
