= Wanchai Tabwises =

Thai volleyball player (born 1986)

Personal information
- Full name: Cha Sip Tri Wanchai Tabwises
- Nickname: Naep
- Born: February 11, 1986 Khon Kaen, Thailand
- Height: 1.85 m (6 ft 1 in)
- Weight: 85 kg (187 lb)
- Spike: 312 cm (10 ft 3 in)
- Block: 302 cm (9 ft 11 in)

Volleyball information
- Position: Outside hitter
- Current club: Nakhon Ratchasima
- Number: 3

Career
- Years: Team
- 2005 – present: Nakhon Ratchasima

National team
- Years: Team
- 2005 – 2013: Thailand
Honours
Men's volleyball
Representing Thailand
Southeast Asian Games
Bronze medal – third place	2007 Nakhon Ratchasima	Team
Silver medal – second place	2009 Vientiane	Team
Gold medal – first place	2011 Palembang/Jakarta	Team
Gold medal – first place	2013 Naypyidaw	Team

Wanchai Tabwises (Thai: วันชัย ทัพวิเศษ; RTGS: Wanchai Thapwiset, born February 11, 1986) is a member of the Thailand men's national volleyball team.

== Career ==
Wanchai became Most Valuable Player in the 2012–13 Thailand League season.

== Club ==
- (Thailand) Nakhon Ratchasima (2005–present)
- (Vietnam) Ho Chi Minh City (2022, loan)
- (Vietnam) Biên Phòng (2023–2024, loan)

== Awards ==
=== Individual ===
- 2012–13 Thailand League "Best spiker"
- 2012–13 Thailand League "Most valuable player"
- 2014–15 Thailand League "Most valuable player"
- 2014–15 Thailand League "Best outside spiker"
- 2014–15 Thailand League "Most valuable player"
- 2014–15 Thailand League "Best outside hitters"
- 2017 Thai-Denmark Super League "Most valuable player"
- 2017–18 Thailand League "Best outside spiker"

=== Club ===
- 2007–08 Thailand League - Champion, with Nakhon Ratchasima
- 2010–11 Thailand League - Runner-Up, with Nakhon Ratchasima
- 2012–13 Thailand League - Champion, with Nakhon Ratchasima
- 2013–14 Thailand League - Champion, with Nakhon Ratchasima
- 2014–15 Thailand League - Champion, with Nakhon Ratchasima
- 2014 Thai–Denmark Super League - Runner-Up, with Nakhon Ratchasima
- 2016 Thai–Denmark Super League - Champion, with Nakhon Ratchasima
- 2016–17 Thailand League - Runner-up, with Nakhon Ratchasima
- 2017 Thai–Denmark Super League - Champion, with Nakhon Ratchasima
- 2017–18 Thailand League - Champion, with Nakhon Ratchasima
- 2018 Thai–Denmark Super League - Third, with Nakhon Ratchasima
- 2019 Thai–Denmark Super League - Champion, with Nakhon Ratchasima
