= Noumory Keita =

Malian volleyball player (born 2001)

Noumory Keïta

Personal information
- Nationality: (Mali) Malian
- Born: 26 June 2001 (age 25)
- Height: 2.06 m (6 ft 9 in)
- Weight: 91 kg (201 lb)

Volleyball information
- Position: Outside/opposite
- Current club: Jakarta Bhayangkara Presisi (on loan from Verona Volley)
- Number: 9

Career
| Years | Teams |
|---|---|
| 2018–2019; 2019–2020; 2020–2022; 2022–2025; 2024; 2024–2025; 2025– 2026– | Mladi Radnik Požarevac; OK Niš; Uijeongbu KB Insurance Stars; Verona Volley; Jakarta Bhayangkara Presisi; Al Rayyan S.C. Verona Volley → Jakarta Bhayangkara Presisi (loan) |

National team
| 2020– | Mali |

Noumory Keïta (born 26 June 2001) is a Malian volleyball player who currently plays for Jakarta Bhayangkara Presisi, on loan from SuperLega club Verona Volley, in the Indonesian Proliga.

== Honours ==
=== Club ===
- AVC Champions League
  - 2025 – with Al Rayyan
  - 2026 – with Jakarta Bhayangkara Presisi
- Indonesian Proliga
  - 2024 – with Jakarta Bhayangkara Presisi
