= Bahrain Volleyball Association =

Bahrain athletic organization

- Sport: Volleyball; Beach volleyball
- Jurisdiction: Bahrain
- Abbreviation: BVA
- Founded: 1976
- Affiliation: FIVB
- Affiliation date: 1976
- Headquarters: Manama
- Location: Bahrain
- Chairman: Sheik Ali Bin Mohamed AL KHALIFA
- Secretary: Mr. Faras AL HALWACHI

Official website
- www.fivb.org/EN/FIVB/Federation.asp?NF=BRN
- (Bahrain)

The Bahrain Volleyball Association (BVA) (Arabic: الاتحاد البحريني للكرة الطائرة), is the governing body for Volleyball in Bahrain since 1976.

== History ==
The Bahrain Volleyball Association has been recognised by FIVB from 1976 and is a member of the Asian Volleyball Confederation and the Arab Volleyball Association. The Federation organizes all domestic volleyball competitions for men and women as well it rules over Beach Volleyball activities in the country for both genders.
