= Prasit Piladuang =

Thai volleyball player (born 1994)

Personal information
- Full name: Cha Akat Tho Prasit Piladuang
- Nickname: Au
- Born: 7 July 1994 (age 32); Thailand
- Height: 1.86 m (6 ft 1 in)
- Weight: 71 kg (157 lb)

Volleyball information
- Position: Setter

Prasit Piladuang (Thai: ประสิทธิ์ พิลาดวง; born July 7, 1994) is a Thai indoor volleyball player who last played for Air Force.

== Career ==
Prasit played with the Sa Kaeo youth team in 2009. He played for Chonburi between 2011 and 2014 and later for Krungkao for the 2014/15 season.

== Clubs ==
- (Thailand) Sisaket Suandusit (2010–2011)
- (Thailand) Chonburi (2011–2014)
- (Thailand) Krungkao (2014–2015)
- (Thailand) Rajamangala Thanyaburi (2015–2016)
- (Thailand) Air Force (2016–2021)

== Award ==
=== Clubs ===
- 2014 Thai-Denmark Super League - Champion, with Chonburi
- 2016–17 Thailand League - Champion, with Air Force
- 2017 Thai–Denmark Super League - Runner-Up, with Air Force
- 2017–18 Thailand League - Champion, with Air Force
- 2017–18 Thailand League - Champion, with Air Force
- 2019 Thai–Denmark Super League - Runner-Up, with Air Force
